= 2017–18 VVV-Venlo season =

Dutch football club season

VVV-Venlo
2017–18 season
- Stadium: Seacon Stadion – De Koel
- Eredivisie: 15th
- KNVB Cup: R16
- Top goalscorer: League: Clint Leemans (10 goals); All: Clint Leemans (10 goals)
- Highest home attendance: 8,000 (3rd & 21st weeks)
- Lowest home attendance: 3,928 (KNVB Cup 2nd round)
- Average home league attendance: 6,646
- Biggest win: 3-0 (Sparta Rotterdam (h) 1st week & Blauw Geel '38 (a) KNVB Cup 1st round)
- Biggest defeat: 3-0 (Heracles Almelo (a) 10th week & Willem II Tilburg (a) 22nd week & PSV Eindhoven (a) 28th week); 5-2 (PSV Eindhoven (h) 8th week 4-1 (AFC Ajax (a) 32nd week & Roda JC Kerkrade (h) 33rd week & PSV Eindhoven (a) KNVB Cup round of 16)
- All statistics correct as of 27 July 2026.

The 2017–18 season was VVV-Venlo's 21st season in the Eredivisie (1st consecutive).

The club competed also in the KNVB Cup. VVV-Venlo lost 4-1 against PSV Eindhoven in round of 16 of KNVB Cup and eliminated from the cup.

Clint Leemans was the top scorer of the club in this season with 10 goals in the Eredivisie.

Nils Röseler was the most appeared players in this season with 37 appearances; 34 appearances in the Eredivisie and 3 appearances in the KNVB Cup.

== Players ==
=== First-team squad ===
Source: Note: Flags indicate national team as defined under FIFA eligibility rules; some limited exceptions apply. Players may hold more than one non-FIFA nationality.

No.	Pos.	Nation	Player
1	GK	GER	Lars Unnerstall
2	DF	NED	Moreno Rutten
3	DF	NED	Jerold Promes
4	DF	NED	Roel Janssen
5	DF	BEL	Leroy Labylle
6	MF	NED	Danny Post
7	FW	NED	Vito van Crooij
8	MF	NED	Clint Leemans
9	FW	NED	Ralf Seuntjens
10	MF	NED	Johnatan Opoku
11	FW	GER	Lennart Thy
12	DF	NED	Jens Janse
13	DF	GER	Nils Röseler

No.	Pos.	Nation	Player
14	FW	MAR	Tarik Tissoudali
15	FW	NED	Romeo Castelen
16	GK	NED	Delano van Crooij
17	DF	NED	Tristan Dekker
19	FW	NED	Torino Hunte
20	MF	NED	Damian van Bruggen
21	MF	AUS	Terry Antonis
22	FW	NED	Mink Peeters
25	DF	TUR	Evren Korkmaz
25	MF	NGA	Kelechi Nwakali
26	FW	DEN	Emil Riis Jakobsen
27	FW	TOG	Etienne Amenyido
37	FW	NED	Evert Linthorst

== Transfers ==
=== In ===
Pos.	Player	Transferred from	Fee	Date
GK	(Germany) Lars Unnerstall	(Germany) Fortuna Düsseldorf	Free	1 July 2017
FW	(Morocco) Tarik Tissoudali	(France) Le Havre AC	On loan	1 July 2017
MF	(Australia) Terry Antonis	(Greece) PAOK FC	Free	8 July 2017
DF	(Belgium) Leroy Labylle	(Netherlands) MVV Maastricht	Free	11 July 2017
FW	(Germany) Lennart Thy	(Germany) SV Werder Bremen	On loan	19 July 2017
DF	(Netherlands) Damian van Bruggen	(Netherlands) Jong PSV	On loan	11 August 2017
FW	(Togo) Etienne Amenyido	(Germany) Borussia Dortmund II	On loan	17 August 2017
FW	(Netherlands) Mink Peeters	(Spain) Real Madrid Castilla	On loan	24 August 2017
MF	(Nigeria) Kelechi Nwakali	(England) Arsenal F.C. U23	On loan	31 August 2017
MF	(Netherlands) Jens Janse	No club		28 September 2017
FW	(Netherlands) Romeo Castelen	(China) Shaoxing Keqiao Yuejia F.C.	Free	9 January 2018
FW	(Denmark) Emil Riis Jakobsen	(England) Derby County F.C. U23	On loan	11 January 2018

=== Out ===
Pos.	Player	Transferred to	Fee	Date
MF	(United States) Gedion Zelalem	(England) Arsenal F.C. U23	End of loan	30 June 2017
FW	(Netherlands) Joey Sleegers	(Netherlands) NEC Nijmegen	End of loan	30 June 2017
GK	(Netherlands) Maarten de Fockert	(Netherlands) SC Heerenveen	End of loan	30 June 2017
MF	(Netherlands) Tim Receveur	(Netherlands) De Graafschap	Free	1 July 2017
FW	(Netherlands) Leandro Resida	(Netherlands) RKC Waalwijk	Free	30 August 2017
MF	(Japan) Rintaro Tashima	(Croatia) GNK Dinamo Zagreb II	Free	22 August 2017
MF	(Australia) Terry Antonis	(Australia) Melbourne Victory FC	Free	3 January 2018
FW	(Togo) Etienne Amenyido	(Germany) Borussia Dortmund II	End of loan	11 January 2018
MF	(Nigeria) Kelechi Nwakali	(England) Arsenal F.C. U23	End of loan	23 January 2018
FW	(Netherlands) Mink Peeters	(Spain) Real Madrid Castilla	End of loan	27 January 2018
FW	(Morocco) Tarik Tissoudali	(France) Le Havre AC	End of loan	28 January 2018
FW	(Netherlands) Juul Respen	(Netherlands) Jong Helmond	Free	30 January 2018

== Competitions ==
=== Overall record ===
Competition	First match	Last match	Starting round	Final position	Record							
Competition	First match	Last match	Starting round	Final position	Pld	W	D	L	GF	GA	GD	Win %
Eredivisie	12 August 2017	6 May 2018	Week 1	15th	34	7	13	14	35	54	−19	20.59
KNVB Cup	21 September 2017	20 December 2017	1st round	Round of 16	3	2	0	1	7	5	+2	66.67
Total					37	9	13	15	42	59	−17	24.32

Source: ESPN

=== Eredivisie ===
==== League table ====
Pos	Team	Pld	W	D	L	GF	GA	GD	Pts	Qualification or relegation
13	Willem II	34	10	7	17	50	63	−13	37	
14	NAC Breda	34	9	7	18	41	57	−16	34	
15	VVV-Venlo	34	7	13	14	35	54	−19	34	
16	Roda JC Kerkrade (R)	34	8	6	20	42	69	−27	30	Qualification for the Relegation play-offs (Note: Ten teams, two from the Eredivisie and eight from the Eerste Divisie, play for two spots in the 2018–19 Eredivisie. The remaining eight teams play in the 2018–19 Eerste Divisie.)
17	Sparta Rotterdam (R)	34	7	6	21	34	75	−41	27	Qualification for the Relegation play-offs

Source: eredivisie.nl
Rules for classification: 1) Points; 2) Goal difference; 3) Goals scored; 4) Head-to-head points; 5) Head-to-head goal difference; 6) Head-to-head away goals scored; 7) Play-off if relevant for deciding champion, relegation or participating in a European league, otherwise by draw. 8) Penalty shoot-out (only after a play-off)
(R) Relegated

==== Results summary ====
Overall								Home						Away					
Pld	W	D	L	GF	GA	GD	Pts	W	D	L	GF	GA	GD	W	D	L	GF	GA	GD
34	7	13	14	35	54	−19	34	3	6	8	19	29	−10	4	7	6	16	25	−9

Source: https://www.espn.nl/voetbal/team/scorebord/_/id/3731/season/2017

==== Results by round ====
Round	1	2	3	4	5	6	7	8	9	10	11	12	13	14	15	16	17	18	19	20	21	22	23	24	25	26	27	28	29	30	31	32	33	34
Ground	H	A	H	A	A	H	A	H	H	A	H	A	H	H	A	H	A	H	A	A	H	A	A	H	H	A	H	A	H	A	H	A	H	A
Result	W	W	L	D	D	D	W	L	L	L	D	D	D	L	D	L	W	W	D	W	W	L	D	D	D	D	L	L	D	L	L	L	L	L
Position																																		15

Source: Eredivisie
A = Away; H = Home; W = Win; D = Draw; L = Loss

=== Matches ===
==== 1st half ====
12 August 2017 1st week	VVV Venlo	3-0	Sparta Rotterdam	Venlo
18:30	Clint Leemans 44'; Tarik Tissoudali 48'; Vito van Crooij 90+2'	Report		Stadium: Seacon Stadion – De Koel – Attendance: 5,832

19 August 2017 2nd week	FC Twente	1-2	VVV Venlo	Enschede
18:30	Tom Boere 60'	Report	Vito van Crooij 23'; Jerold Promes 41'	Stadium: De Grolsch Veste; Attendance: 23,800

27 August 2017 3rd week	VVV Venlo	0-2	AFC Ajax	Venlo
14:30		Report	Donny van de Beek 55'; David Neres 70'	Stadium: Seacon Stadion – De Koel – Attendance: 8,000

10 September 2017 4th week	FC Groningen	1-1	VVV Venlo	Groningen
16:45	Mimoun Mahi 15'	Report	Kelechi Nwakali 90+1'	Stadium: Euroborg; Attendance: 15,832

17 September 2017 5th week	SBV Vitesse	1-1	VVV Venlo	Arnhem
16:45	Tim Matavz 47'	Report	Clint Leemans 90' (pen.)	Stadium: GelreDome; Attendance: 15,213

24 September 2017 6th week	VVV Venlo	1-1	PEC Zwolle	Venlo
14:30	Clint Leemans 69'	Report	Kingsley Ehizibue 30'	Stadium: Seacon Stadion – De Koel – Attendance: 6,621

30 September 2017 7th week	Excelsior Rotterdam	0-2	VVV Venlo	Rotterdam
20:45		Report	Clint Leemans 32'; Ralf Seuntjens 70'	Stadium: Stadion Woudestein; Attendance: 3,704

15 October 2017 8th week	VVV Venlo	2-5	PSV Eindhoven	Venlo
14:30	Clint Leemans 40' (pen.); Torino Hunte 48'	Report	Jürgen Locadia 23'; Gastón Pereiro 58' 85'; Daniel Schwaab 67'; Mauro Júnior 72'	Stadium: Seacon Stadion – De Koel – Attendance: 8,000

21 October 2017 9th week	VVV Venlo	0-2	ADO Den Haag	Venlo
19:45		Report	Erik Falkenburg 66'; Bjorn Johnsen 90+3'	Stadium: Seacon Stadion – De Koel – Attendance: 6,532

28 October 2017 10th week	Heracles Almelo	3-0	VVV Venlo	Almelo
18:30	Brandley Kuwas 35'; Kristoffer Peterson 40' 69'	Report		Stadium: Asito Stadion; Attendance: 10,364

4 November 2017 11th week	VVV Venlo	0-0	NAC Breda	Venlo
20:45		Report		Stadium: Seacon Stadion – De Koel – Attendance: 6,521

18 November 2017 12th week	Feyenoord	1-1	VVV Venlo	Rotterdam
18:30	Nicolai Jørgensen 54'	Report	Damian van Bruggen 86'	Stadium: De Kuip; Attendance: 47,500

25 November 2017 13th week	VVV Venlo	3-3	Willem II Tilburg	Venlo
18:30	Vito van Crooij 7'; Damian van Bruggen 49'; Clint Leemans 72' (pen.)	Report	Bartholomew Ogbeche 62' 74' 90+2'	Stadium: Seacon Stadion – De Koel – Attendance: 6,782

3 December 2017 14th week	VVV Venlo	0-2	AZ Alkmaar	Venlo
12:30		Report	Ralf Seuntjens 73' (o.g.); Pantelis Hatzidiakos 84'	Stadium: Seacon Stadion – De Koel – Attendance: 6,353

9 December 2017 15th week	SC Heerenveen	2-2	VVV Venlo	Heerenveen
18:30	Denzel Dumfries 19'; Henk Veerman 49'	Report	Lennart Thy 10'; Ralf Seuntjens 85'	Stadium: Abe Lenstra Stadion; Attendance: 18,893

13 December 2017 16th week	VVV Venlo	0-1	FC Utrecht	Venlo
19:45		Report	Gyrano Kerk 24'	Stadium: Seacon Stadion – De Koel – Attendance: 5,778

16 December 2017 17th week	Roda JC Kerkrade	0-1	VVV Venlo	Kerkrade
20:45		Report	Clint Leemans 76'	Stadium: Parkstad Limburg Stadion; Attendance: 13,189

24 December 2017 18th week	VVV Venlo	3-1	Heracles Almelo	Venlo
14:30	Lennart Thy 17' 54' 76'	Report	Reuven Niemeijer 27' (pen.)	Stadium: Seacon Stadion – De Koel – Attendance: 7,528

==== 2nd half ====
20 January 2018 19th week	ADO Den Haag	1-1	VVV Venlo	Den Haag
19:45	Bjorn Johnsen 23'	Report	Johnatan Opoku 86'	Stadium: ADO Den Haag Stadium; Attendance: 11,008

27 January 2018 20th week	NAC Breda	0-1	VVV Venlo	Breda
20:45		Report	Lennart Thy 73'	Stadium: Rat Verlegh Stadion; Attendance: 18,443

4 February 2018 21st week	VVV Venlo	1-0	Feyenoord	Venlo
14:30	Clint Leemans 88' (pen.)	Report		Stadium: Seacon Stadion – De Koel – Attendance: 8,000

7 February 2018 22nd week	Willem II Tilburg	3-0	VVV Venlo	Tilburg
20:45	Bartholomew Ogbeche 44'; Ben Rienstra 49'; Jordy Croux 53'	Report		Stadium: Koning Willem II Stadion; Attendance: 11,500

10 February 2018 23rd week	AZ Alkmaar	0-0	VVV Venlo	Alkmaar
20:45		Report		Stadium: AFAS Stadion; Attendance: 14,023

16 February 2018 24th week	VVV Venlo	1-1	FC Groningen	Venlo
20:00	Vito van Crooij 2'	Report	Ritsu Doan 15'	Stadium: Seacon Stadion – De Koel – Attendance: 6,624

24 February 2018 25th week	VVV Venlo	2-2	SBV Vitesse	Venlo
20:45	Torino Hunte 10'; Lennart Thy 24'	Report	Nils Roseler 29' (o.g.); Mason Mount 48'	Stadium: Seacon Stadion – De Koel – Attendance: 6,168

4 March 2018 26th week	PEC Zwolle	1-1	VVV Venlo	Zwolle
12:30	Mustafa Saymak 73'	Report	Vito van Crooij 68'	Stadium: MAC³PARK Stadion; Attendance: 12,985

10 March 2018 27th week	VVV Venlo	2-3	Excelsior Rotterdam	Venlo
19:45	Jurgen Mattheij 41' (o.g.); Lennart Thy 84'	Report	Levi García 35'; Hicham Faik 61'; Mike van Duinen 81'	Stadium: Seacon Stadion – De Koel – Attendance: 6,021

17 March 2018 28th week	PSV Eindhoven	3-0	VVV Venlo	Eindhoven
19:45	Marco van Ginkel 68' 83' (pen.); Hirving Lozano 80'	Report		Stadium: Philips Stadion; Attendance: 33,900

1 April 2018 29th week	VVV Venlo	0-0	FC Twente	Venlo
12:30		Report		Stadium: Seacon Stadion – De Koel – Attendance: 6,623

7 April 2018 30th week	Sparta Rotterdam	3-2	VVV Venlo	Rotterdam
20:45	Soufyan Ahannach 19'; Robert Mühren 81' 90'	Report	Clint Leemans 43' 52'	Stadium: Het Kasteel; Attendance: 10,139

14 April 2018 31st week	VVV Venlo	0-2	SC Heerenveen	Venlo
19:45		Report	Reza Ghoochannejhad 69'; Nemanja Mihajlovic 79'	Stadium: Seacon Stadion – De Koel – Attendance: 7,054

19 April 2018 32nd week	AFC Ajax	4-1	VVV Venlo	Amsterdam
20:45	David Neres 45' 45+3'; Klaas-Jan Huntelaar 59'; Hakim Ziyech 79'	Report	Ralf Seuntjens 43'	Stadium: Johan Cruijff Arena; Attendance: 30,295

29 April 2018 33rd week	VVV Venlo	1-4	Roda JC Kerkrade	Venlo
14:30	Torino Hunte 33'	Report	Jannes Vansteenkiste 23'; Adil Auassar 48'; Dani Schahin 57'; Mario Engels 77'	Stadium: Seacon Stadion – De Koel – Attendance: 7,255

6 May 2018 34th week	FC Utrecht	1-0	VVV Venlo	Utrecht
14:30	Mateusz Klich 71'	Report		Stadium: Stadion Galgenwaard; Attendance: 19,669

=== KNVB Cup ===
21 September 2017 1st round	Blauw Geel '38	0-3	VVV Venlo	Veghal
19:45		Report		Stadium: Prins Willem Alexander Sportpark; Attendance: 1,850

25 October 2017 2nd round	VVV Venlo	3-1	FC Utrecht	Venlo
18:30	Lennart Thy 2'; Torino Hunte 20'; Moreno Rutten 82'	Report	Gyrano Kerk 61'	Stadium: Seacon Stadion – De Koel – Attendance: 3,928

20 December 2017 Round of 16	PSV Eindhoven	4-1	VVV Venlo	Eindhoven
18:30	Luuk de Jong 45+2'; Marco van Ginkel 66'; Hirving Lozano 79'; Nicolas Isimat-Mirin 90+3'	Report	Moreno Rutten 41'	Stadium: Philips Stadion; Attendance: 31,800

== Statistics ==
=== Scorers ===
#	Player	Eredivisie	KNVB	Total
1	(Netherlands) Clint Leemans	10	0	10
2	(Germany) Lennart Thy	7	1	8
3	(Netherlands) Vito van Crooij	5	0	5
4	(Netherlands) Torino Hunte	3	1	4
5	(Netherlands) Damian van Bruggen	2	1	3
5	(Netherlands) Ralf Seuntjens	3	0	3
7	(Netherlands) Moreno Rutten	0	2	2
8	(Netherlands) Jerold Promes	1	0	1
8	(Netherlands) Johnatan Opoku	1	0	1
8	(Nigeria) Kelechi Nwakali	1	0	1
8	(Morocco) Tarik Tissoudali	1	0	1
8	(Togo) Etienne Amenyido	0	1	1
8	(Australia) Terry Antonis	0	1	1

=== Appearances ===
#	Player	Eredivisie	KNVB	Total
1	(Germany) Nils Röseler	34	3	37
2	(Netherlands) Clint Leemans	33	3	36
3	(Germany) Lennart Thy	32	2	34
3	(Netherlands) Ralf Seuntjens	32	2	34
5	(Netherlands) Torino Hunte	32	1	33
5	(Netherlands) Vito van Crooij	31	2	33
7	(Germany) Lars Unnerstall	32	0	32
7	(Netherlands) Moreno Rutten	30	2	32
9	(Netherlands) Jerold Promes	30	1	31
10	(Netherlands) Damian van Bruggen	26	3	29
11	(Netherlands) Roel Janssen	25	2	27
12	(Belgium) Leroy Labylle	21	1	22
13	(Netherlands) Danny Post	20	1	21
14	(Netherlands) Johnatan Opoku	18	1	19
15	(Netherlands) Tristan Dekker	15	0	15
16	(Netherlands) Romeo Castelen	14	0	14
16	(Morocco) Tarik Tissoudali	14	0	14
18	(Nigeria) Kelechi Nwakali	9	3	12
19	(Netherlands) Jens Janse	10	1	11
20	(Netherlands) Delano van Crooij	2	3	5
21	(Togo) Etienne Amenyido	2	2	4
22	(Denmark) Emil Riis Jakobsen	3	0	3
23	(Turkey) Evren Korkmaz	2	0	2
23	(Australia) Terry Antonis	0	2	2
25	(Netherlands) Evert Linthorst	1	0	1
25	(Netherlands) Mink Peeters	0	1	1

=== Clean sheets ===
#	Player	Eredivisie	KNVB Cup	Total
1	(Germany) Lars Unnerstall	8	1	9

=== Disciplinary record ===
#	Player	Eredivisie		KNVB		Total	
#	Player	Booked	Sent off (straight red)	Booked	Sent off (straight red)	Booked	Sent off (straight red)
1	(Netherlands) Ralf Seuntjens	5	1	0	0	5	1
2	(Netherlands) Danny Post	8	0	0	0	8	0
3	(Netherlands) Vito van Crooij	6	0	1	0	7	0
4	(Netherlands) Clint Leemans	5	0	1	0	6	0
5	(Netherlands) Roel Janssen	4	0	1	0	5	0
6	(Netherlands) Moreno Rutten	4	0	0	0	4	0
7	(Netherlands) Damian van Bruggen	2	0	1	0	3	0
7	(Netherlands) Jerold Promes	3	0	0	0	3	0
7	(Germany) Nils Roseler	2	0	1	0	3	0
7	(Netherlands) Torino Hunte	3	0	0	0	3	0
11	(Belgium) Leroy Labylle	2	0	0	0	2	0
12	(Netherlands) Jens Janse	1	0	0	0	1	0
12	(Germany) Lars Unnerstall	1	0	0	0	1	0
12	(Germany) Lennart Thy	0	0	1	0	1	0
12	(Netherlands) Romeo Castelen	1	0	0	0	1	0
12	(Morocco) Tarik Tissoudali	1	0	0	0	1	0
12	(Netherlands) Tristan Dekker	1	0	0	0	1	0
