= List of foreign A-League Men players =

This is a list of foreign players in the A-League Men, which commenced play in 2005. The following players must meet both of the following two criteria:

1. Have played in at least one A-League Men game (including finals). Players who were signed by A-League clubs, but only played in cup and/or continental games, or did not play in any competitive games at all, are not included.
2. Are considered foreign, i.e., outside Australia and New Zealand determined by the following:

A player is considered foreign if he is not eligible to play for the national team of Australia or New Zealand.

More specifically,

- If a player has been capped on international level, the national team is used; if he has been capped by more than one country, the highest level (or the most recent) team is used. These include Australia/New Zealand players with dual citizenship.
- If a player has not been capped on international level, his country of birth is used, except those who were born abroad from Australian parents or moved to Australia at a young age.

Clubs listed are those for which the player has played at least one A-League Men game. Note that calendar years are used. This follows general practice in expressing years a player spent at club.

As of 23 October 2026, 100 different nations have been represented in the A-League Men. Moldova is the most recent nation to be represented with Virgiliu Postolachi making his debut for Brisbane Roar.

In bold: players who are currently at an A-League Men club.

== Afghanistan ==
- Rahmat Akbari – Brisbane Roar – 2017–18, 2019–23, Melbourne Victory – 2018–19

== Albania ==
- Migjen Basha – Melbourne Victory – 2019–20

== Algeria ==
- Karim Matmour – Adelaide United – 2017

== Argentina ==
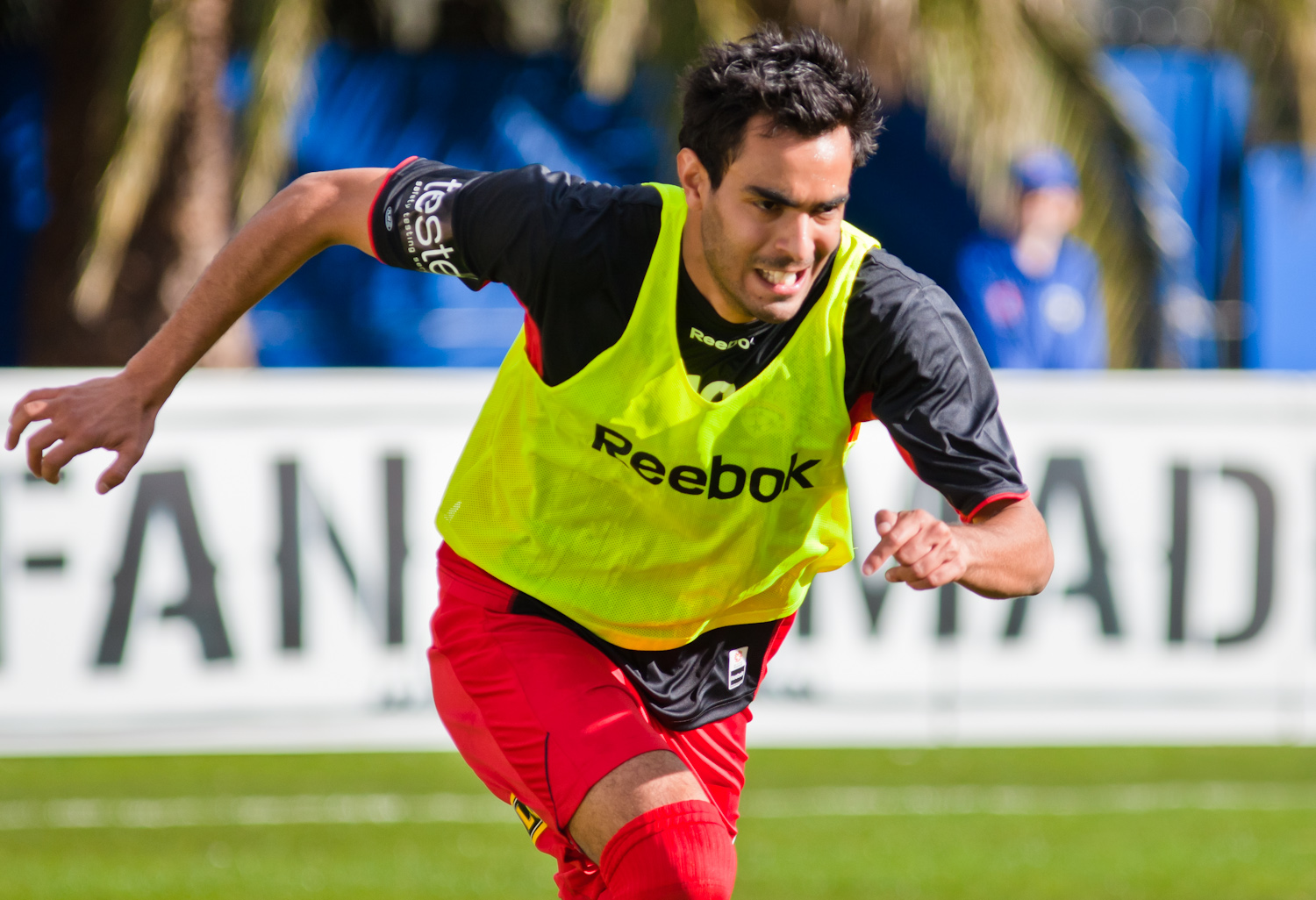
Marcos Flores won the Johnny Warren Medal in 2011.

- Fernando Brandán – Melbourne City – 2016–17
- Marcelo Carrusca – Adelaide United – 2012–17, Melbourne City – 2017–18, Western Sydney Wanderers – 2018
- Nicolás Colazo – Melbourne City – 2016–17
- Matías Córdoba – Perth Glory – 2013
- Oscar Roberto Cornejo – Wellington Phoenix – 2010–11
- Jorge Drovandi – Newcastle Jets – 2007
- **Germán Ferreyra** – Melbourne City – 2024–26, **Western Sydney Wanderers** – 2026–
- Marcos Flores – Adelaide United – 2010–11, Melbourne Victory – 2012–13, Central Coast Mariners – 2013–14, Newcastle Jets – 2014–15
- Jonatan Germano – Melbourne City – 2011–15
- Juan Lescano – Brisbane Roar – 2021–22
- Nicolás Martínez – Western Sydney Wanderers – 2016–17
- Jerónimo Neumann – Adelaide United – 2012–14, Newcastle Jets – 2014–15
- Patricio Pérez – Central Coast Mariners – 2010–11
- Patito Rodríguez – Newcastle Jets – 2018
- Matías Sánchez – Melbourne Victory – 2017–18
- Adrian Trinidad – Perth Glory – 2008–09

== Austria ==
- Marcel Canadi – Brisbane Roar – 2023
- Kristijan Dobras – Melbourne Victory – 2019–20
- Andreas Kuen – Melbourne City – 2024–26
- Marc Janko – Sydney FC – 2014–15
- Richard Kitzbichler – Melbourne Victory – 2005–06
- Richard Windbichler – Melbourne City – 2019–20

== Bahrain ==
- Sayed Mohamed Adnan – Brisbane Roar – 2011–12

== Barbados ==
- Paul Ifill – Wellington Phoenix – 2009–14

== Belgium ==
- Dino Arslanagić – Macarthur FC – 2024–25
- Geoffrey Claeys – Melbourne Victory – 2005–06
- Pieter Collen – Brisbane Roar – 2010
- Ritchie De Laet – Melbourne City – 2018–19
- Anas Hamzaoui – Perth Glory – 2024–25
- Stein Huysegems – Wellington Phoenix – 2012–14
- Louis Verstraete – Auckland FC – 2024–26

== Benin ==
- Rudy Gestede – Melbourne Victory – 2020–21

== Bosnia and Herzegovina ==
- Sulejman Krpić – Western Sydney Wanderers – 2022–23
- **Milorad Stajić** – **Brisbane Roar** – 2025–

== Brazil ==
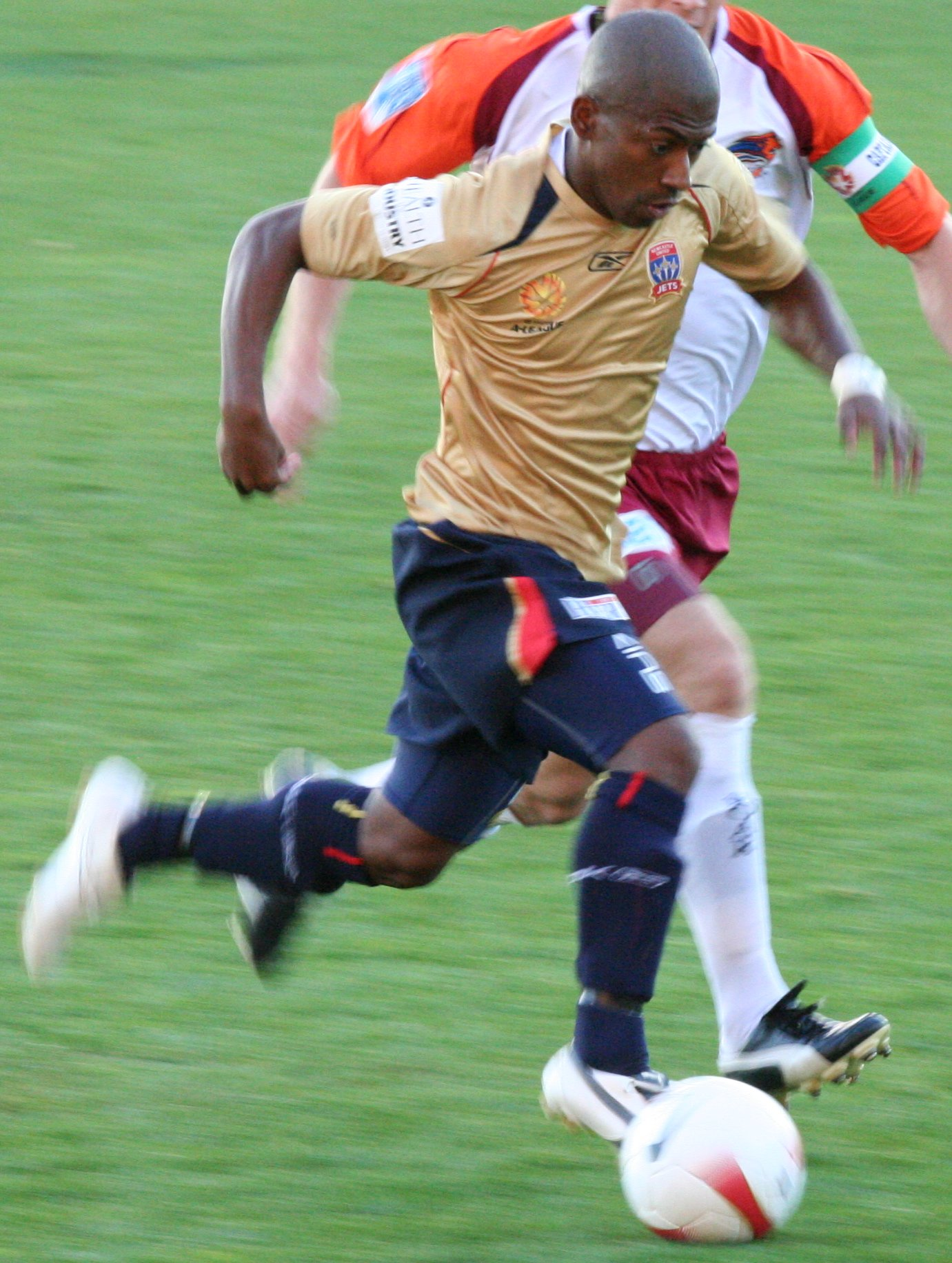
Denni won the A-League Championship in 2008 with Newcastle Jets.

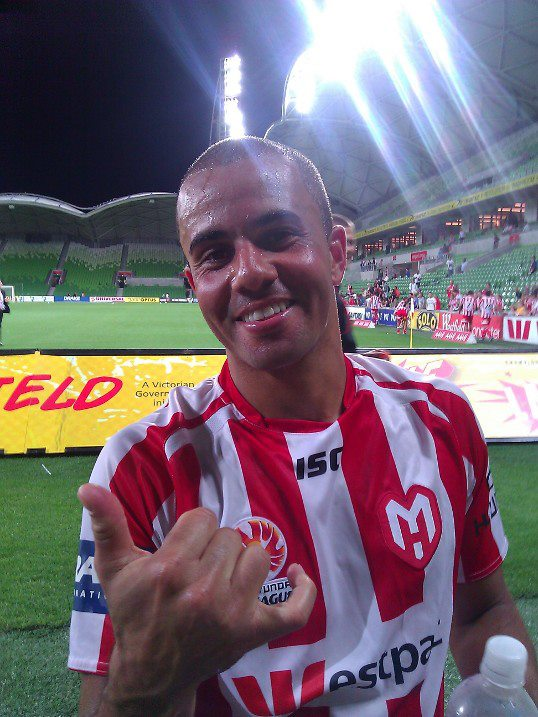
Fred played for three A-League clubs, including winning the Championship and Premiership with Melbourne Victory in 2007.

- Alemão – Adelaide United – 2008–10
- Alessandro – Melbourne Victory – 2007
- Amaral – Perth Glory – 2008–09
- Anderson – Gold Coast United – 2010–11
- Andrezinho – Perth Glory – 2011–12
- **Anselmo** – **Adelaide United** – 2025–
- Ronald Barcellos – Central Coast Mariners – 2024
- Bobô – Sydney FC – 2016–18, 2021–22
- Bruno Cazarine – Sydney FC – 2010–12
- Claudinho – Melbourne Victory – 2006–07
- Cleberson – Wellington Phoenix – 2007
- Douglas Costa – Sydney FC – 2024–25
- Cristiano – Adelaide United – 2008–10
- Denni – Newcastle Jets – 2007–08
- Diego – Adelaide United – 2006–09, Wellington Phoenix – 2010–11
- Mikael Doka – Central Coast Mariners – 2023–26
- Ney Fabiano – Melbourne Victory – 2008–09
- Fabinho – Melbourne Victory – 2011–12, Sydney FC – 2012–13
- Vitor Feijão – Central Coast Mariners – 2024–25
- Felipe – Wellington Phoenix – 2007–08
- Gui Finkler – Melbourne Victory – 2012–16, Wellington Phoenix – 2016–17
- Fred – Melbourne Victory – 2006–07, Wellington Phoenix – 2008, Melbourne Heart – 2011–13
- George – Wellington Phoenix – 2007
- Fábio Gomes – Sydney FC – 2023–24
- Jair – Newcastle Jets – 2018–19, Central Coast Mariners – 2019–20
- Mário Jardel – Newcastle Jets – 2007–08
- Jefferson – Gold Coast United – 2009–10
- Juninho – Sydney FC – 2007–08
- Gabriel Lacerda – Sydney FC – 2023–24
- Leandro Love – Melbourne Victory – 2007–08
- Marcelo – Western Sydney Wanderers – 2022–24
- Leonardo – Newcastle Jets – 2015–16
- Marcinho – Queensland Roar – 2007–08
- Maycon – Melbourne Heart – 2011–12
- Milson – Gold Coast United – 2009–10
- Moresche – Central Coast Mariners – 2021–23
- Léo Natel – Melbourne City – 2023–24
- Patrick – Sydney FC – 2007–08
- Daniel Penha – Newcastle Jets – 2021–22, Western United – 2023–24
- Reinaldo – Brisbane Roar – 2005–10
- Bernardo Ribeiro – Newcastle Jets – 2012–13
- Ricardinho – Melbourne Victory – 2010–11
- Robson – Gold Coast United – 2009–12
- Romário – Adelaide United – 2006
- **Matheus Rossetto** – **Melbourne City** – 2026–
- Vítor Saba – Western Sydney Wanderers – 2014–15
- **Santos** – **Melbourne Victory** – 2024–
- Yan Sasse – Wellington Phoenix – 2022–23
- Léo Sena – Sydney FC – 2024–25
- Sidnei – Perth Glory – 2013–16
- Alex Terra – Melbourne Heart – 2010–12
- Tiago – Newcastle Jets – 2011–13, Sydney FC – 2013–14
- Marco Túlio – Central Coast Mariners – 2022–24
- Wellissol – Newcastle Jets – 2024–25

== Bulgaria ==
- Bozhidar Kraev – Wellington Phoenix – 2022–24, Western Sydney Wanderers – 2024–26

== Burundi ==
- Elvis Kamsoba – Melbourne Victory – 2019–21, Sydney FC – 2021–22
- Pacifique Niyongabire – Adelaide United – 2018–2021, Perth Glory – 2021–22

== Cameroon ==
- Olivier Boumal – Newcastle Jets – 2021–22

== Canada ==
- Manjrekar James – Wellington Phoenix – 2025–26
- Alen Marcina – New Zealand Knights – 2006–07
- Issey Nakajima-Farran – Brisbane Roar – 2011–12

== Chile ==
- Pablo Contreras – Melbourne Victory – 2013–14
- Vicente Fernández – Melbourne City – 2024
- **Felipe Gallegos** – **Auckland FC** – 2024–

== China ==
- Gao Leilei – New Zealand Knights – 2006–07, Wellington Phoenix – 2008
- Jiang Chen – Wellington Phoenix – 2009
- Li Yan – New Zealand Knights – 2006
- Ma Leilei – Newcastle Jets – 2016–17
- Qu Shengqing – Adelaide United – 2005–07
- Zhang Shuo – Newcastle Jets – 2010–11
- Zhang Xiaobin – New Zealand Knights – 2005–06
- Zhang Yuning – Queensland Roar – 2006–07

== Colombia ==
- Cristian Caicedo – Perth Glory – 2024
- Neyder Moreno – Auckland FC – 2024–25
- Milton Rodríguez – Newcastle Jets – 2006–07
- Ángel Torres – Central Coast Mariners – 2023–24

== Costa Rica ==
- Marvin Angulo – Melbourne Victory – 2009–10
- Steven Bryce – Brisbane Roar – 2010
- **Julio Cascante** – **Melbourne City** – 2026–
- Kenny Cunningham – Wellington Phoenix – 2013–15
- Carlos Hernández – Melbourne Victory – 2007–12, Wellington Phoenix – 2013–14
- José Luis López – Melbourne Victory – 2008–09
- Youstin Salas – Wellington Phoenix – 2024, Brisbane Roar – 2025–26
- Jean Carlos Solórzano – Brisbane Roar – 2010–11, 2014–16, Melbourne Victory – 2011–12
- Marco Ureña – Central Coast Mariners – 2020–22

== Croatia ==
- Dario Bodrušić – Adelaide United – 2011
- Mate Dragičević – Perth Glory – 2007
- Šime Gržan – Macarthur FC – 2025–26
- Marin Jakoliš – Melbourne City 2023–24, Macarthur FC – 2024–25
- Dario Jertec – Western United – 2019–20
- Krunoslav Lovrek – Sydney FC – 2012–13
- Ivan Kelava – Melbourne Victory – 2021–22
- Dino Kresinger – Western Sydney Wanderers – 2012–13
- Goran Paracki – Wellington Phoenix – 2017–18
- Mateo Poljak – Western Sydney Wanderers – 2012–15, Newcastle Jets – 2015–17
- Josip Tadić – Melbourne Heart – 2012–13

== Curaçao ==
- Roly Bonevacia – Wellington Phoenix – 2014–17, Western Sydney Wanderers – 2017–19, Melbourne Victory – 2024
- Dyron Daal – North Queensland Fury – 2009–11
- Guyon Fernandez – Perth Glory – 2015–16
- Darryl Lachman – Perth Glory – 2020–24
- Michaël Maria – Adelaide United – 2019–20

== Denmark ==
- Johan Absalonsen – Adelaide United – 2017–18
- Jesper Håkansson – Newcastle Jets – 2008–09
- Ken Ilsø – Adelaide United – 2018–19
- Michael Jakobsen – Melbourne City – 2016–18, Adelaide United – 2018–22
- Thomas Kristensen – Brisbane Roar – 2016–19
- **Emiliano Marcondes** – **Melbourne City** – 2026–
- Tobias Mikkelsen – Brisbane Roar – 2018–19
- Morten Nordstrand – Newcastle Jets – 2016–17
- Jakob Poulsen – Melbourne Victory – 2019–20
- Thomas Sørensen – Melbourne City – 2015–17

== DR Congo ==
- Yeni Ngbakoto – Western Sydney Wanderers – 2022–23
- **Marcel Tisserand** – **Sydney FC** – 2025–

== Ecuador ==
- Néicer Acosta – Brisbane Roar – 2024–25
- Luis Cangá – Perth Glory – 2024
- Edson Montaño – Newcastle Jets – 2014–15
- Edmundo Zura – Newcastle Jets – 2008

== England ==
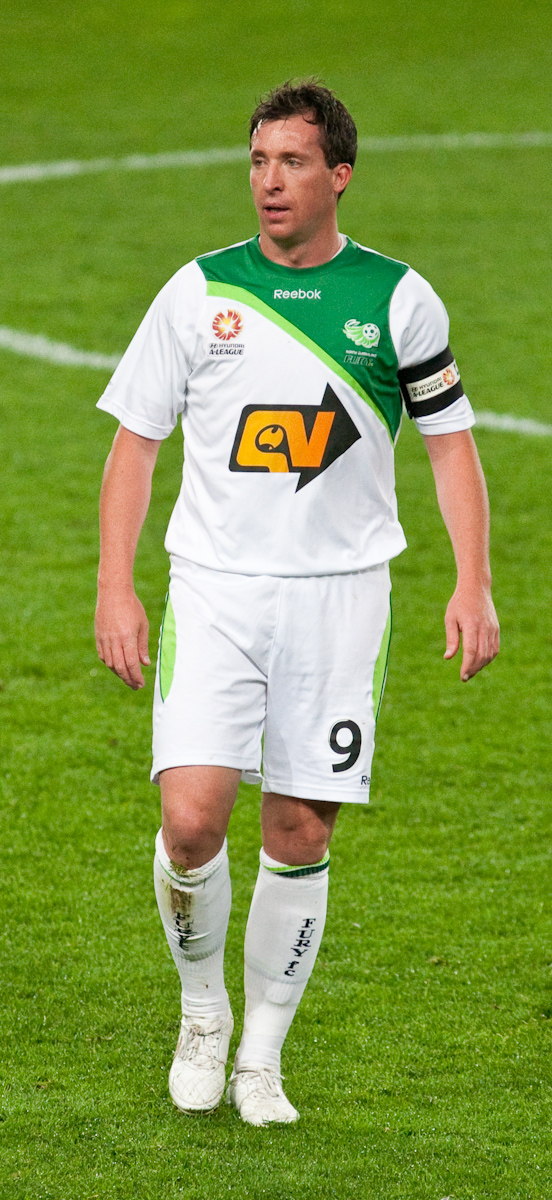
Robbie Fowler was the inaugural captain of North Queensland Fury.

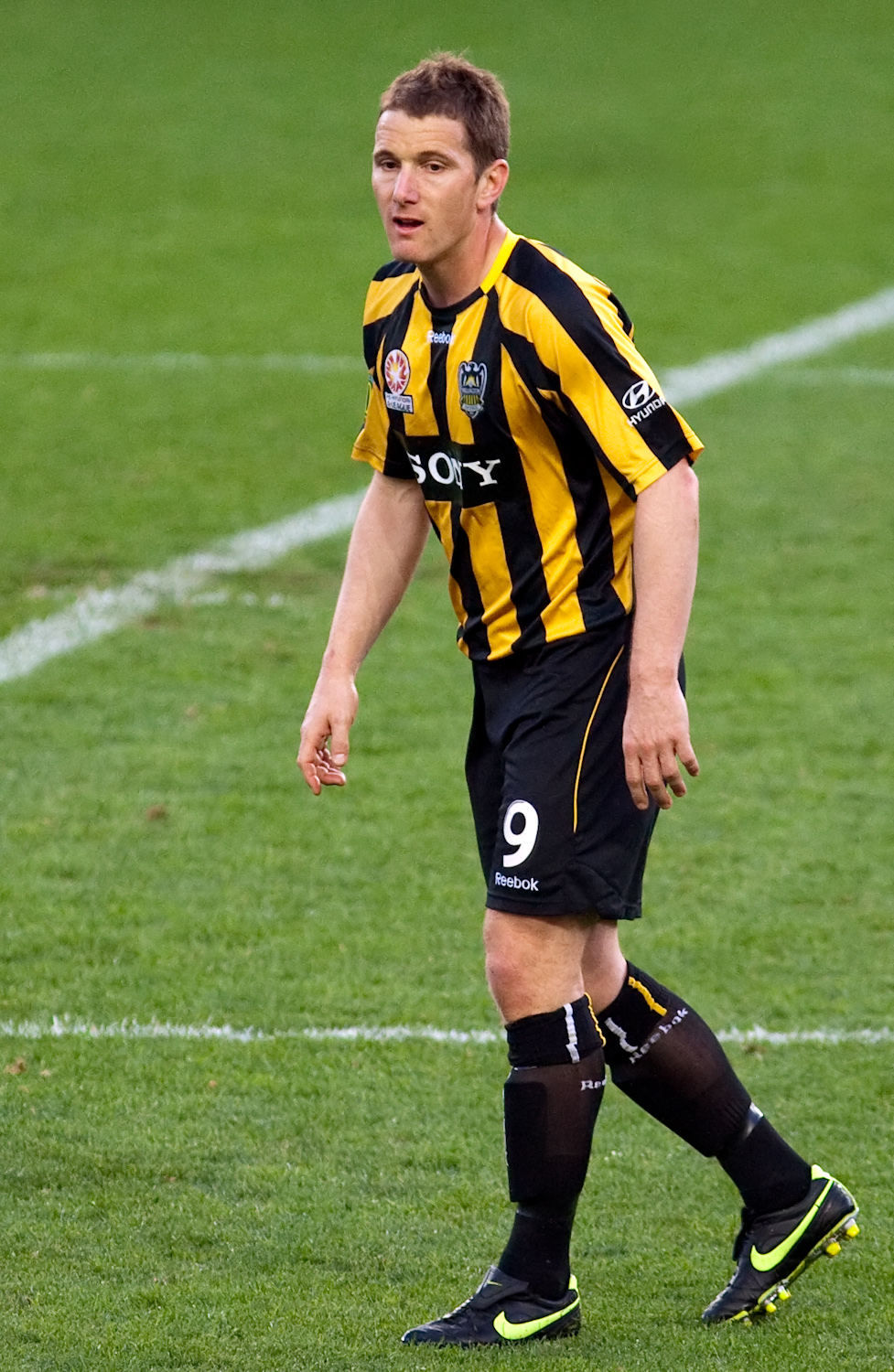
Chris Greenacre played for Wellington Phoenix for three seasons, later going on to coach the side.

- Luke Amos – Perth Glory – 2025–26
- Charlie Austin – Brisbane Roar – 2022
- David Ball – Wellington Phoenix – 2019–25
- Guy Bates – Newcastle Jets – 2005
- Darren Bazeley – New Zealand Knights – 2005–07
- Mark Beevers – Perth Glory – 2022–24
- Michael Bridges – Sydney FC – 2007–08, Newcastle Jets – 2009–14
- Wayne Brown – Newcastle Jets – 2016–18
- Malik Buari – New Zealand Knights – 2006–07
- Ronnie Bull – New Zealand Knights – 2005–06
- Jacob Butterfield – Melbourne Victory – 2020–21
- **Zach Clough** – Adelaide United – 2022–25, **Newcastle Jets** – 2026–
- Ben Collett – New Zealand Knights – 2006
- Terry Cooke – North Queensland Fury – 2009–10
- **Sam Cosgrove** – **Auckland FC** – 2025–
- John Curtis – Gold Coast United – 2010–11
- Brian Deane – Perth Glory – 2005
- Matt Derbyshire – Macarthur FC – 2020–21
- Ryan Edmondson – Central Coast Mariners – 2024–26
- Neil Emblen – New Zealand Knights – 2005–07
- Robbie Fowler – North Queensland Fury – 2009–10, Perth Glory – 2010–11
- Macaulay Gillesphey – Brisbane Roar – 2019–2021
- **John-Kymani Gordon** – **Central Coast Mariners** – 2026–
- Sam Graham – Central Coast Mariners – 2019
- Chris Greenacre – Wellington Phoenix – 2009–12
- Dean Gordon – New Zealand Knights – 2006–07
- Shayon Harrison – Melbourne City – 2019
- Daniel Heffernan – Central Coast Mariners – 2015–16
- Emile Heskey – Newcastle Jets – 2012–14
- Gary Hooper – Wellington Phoenix – 2019–20, 2021–22
- Mark Hughes – North Queensland Fury – 2010–11
- Francis Jeffers – Newcastle Jets – 2010–11, 2011–12
- Carl Jenkinson – Melbourne City – 2022, Newcastle Jets – 2022–24
- Joe Keenan – Melbourne Victory – 2007–08, Adelaide United – 2010–11
- Geoff Kellaway – Melbourne Victory – 2010–11
- Adam Le Fondre – Sydney FC – 2018–23
- Mark Lee – Perth Glory – 2006–07, 2008–09
- **Joe Lolley** – Sydney FC – 2022–26, **Newcastle Jets** – 2026–
- Chris Long – Brisbane Roar – 2025–26
- Steve McMahon – Perth Glory – 2005–06
- Callum McManaman – Melbourne Victory – 2020–21
- Joseph Mills – Perth Glory – 2016–18
- Jordon Mutch – Western Sydney Wanderers – 2021, Macarthur FC – 2021–2022
- Craig Noone – Melbourne City – 2019–21, Macarthur FC – 2021–23
- James Robinson – Melbourne Victory – 2006–07, Perth Glory – 2007–09, North Queensland Fury – 2009–10
- Jack Rodwell – Western Sydney Wanderers – 2021–22, Sydney FC – 2022–24
- Ryan Shotton – Melbourne Victory – 2020–21
- Daniel Sturridge – Perth Glory – 2021–22
- John Sutton – Central Coast Mariners – 2012
- Steven Taylor – Wellington Phoenix – 2018–20, 2021
- Andy Todd – Perth Glory – 2009–11
- Nicky Travis – Central Coast Mariners – 2009–10
- Ryan Tunnicliffe – Adelaide United – 2023–25
- Scott Wootton – Wellington Phoenix – 2022–25, Perth Glory – 2025–26
- Simon Yeo – New Zealand Knights – 2005

== Eritrea ==
- Ambesager Yosief – Gold Coast United – 2011–12

== Fiji ==
- Roy Krishna – Wellington Phoenix – 2014–19

== Finland ==
- Aleksandr Kokko – Newcastle Jets – 2016–17
- Thomas Lam – Melbourne City – 2022–23
- Juho Mäkelä – Sydney FC – 2011–12

== France ==
- Romain Amalfitano – Western Sydney Wanderers – 2022–23
- Éric Bauthéac – Brisbane Roar – 2017–19
- Florin Berenguer – Melbourne City – 2018–23, Brisbane Roar – 2023–25
- Jason Berthomier – Newcastle Jets – 2023–24
- Damien Da Silva – Melbourne Victory – 2023–24, Macarthur FC – 2025–26
- Matthieu Delpierre – Melbourne Victory – 2014–16
- William Gallas – Perth Glory – 2013–14
- Valère Germain – Macarthur FC – 2023–2025
- Zinédine Machach – Melbourne Victory – 2023–25
- Béni Nkololo – Central Coast Mariners – 2021–23
- Loïc Puyo – Macarthur FC – 2020–21
- Morgan Schneiderlin – Western Sydney Wanderers – 2023
- Samuel Souprayen – Melbourne City – 2023–26

== Georgia ==
- Bachana Arabuli – Macarthur FC – 2022–23
- Beka Dartsmelia – Newcastle Jets – 2022–23
- Beka Mikeltadze – Newcastle Jets – 2021–23

== Germany ==
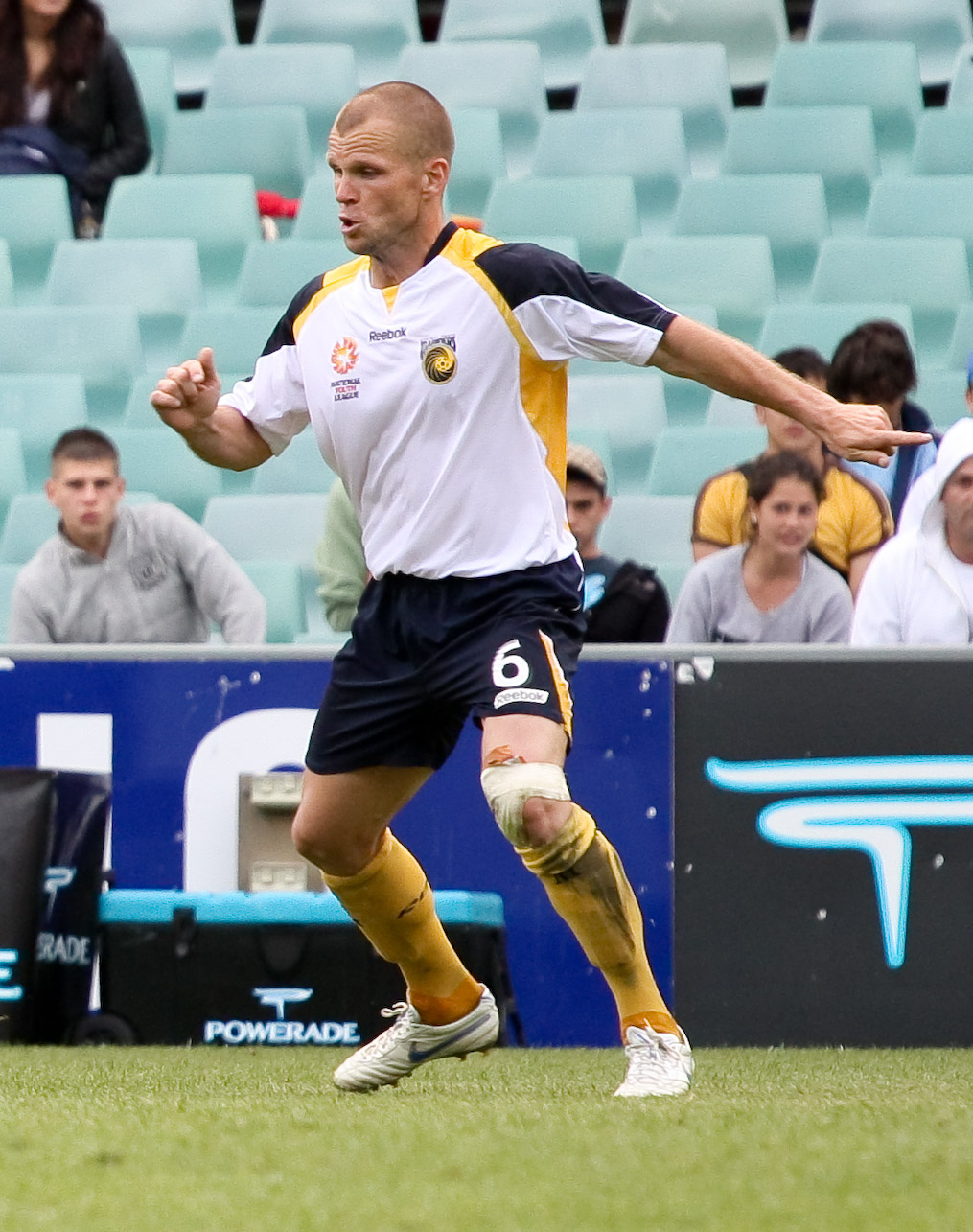
André Gumprecht played for Central Coast Mariners in the first four A-League seasons.

- Daniel Adlung – Adelaide United – 2017–18
- Ahmet Arslan – Sydney FC – 2026
- Tolgay Arslan – Melbourne City – 2023–24
- Alexander Baumjohann – Western Sydney Wanderers – 2018–19, Sydney FC – 2019–21
- Maximilian Beister – Melbourne Victory – 2016–17
- Mirko Boland – Adelaide United – 2018–20
- Thomas Broich – Brisbane Roar – 2010–17
- André Gumprecht – Central Coast Mariners – 2005–09
- Tim Hoogland – Melbourne Victory – 2019–20
- **Marko Ilic – Brisbane Roar** – 2026–
- André Kilian – North Queensland Fury – 2010–11
- Sonny Kittel – Western Sydney Wanderers – 2024
- Sebastian Langkamp – Perth Glory – 2021
- Alexander Meier – Western Sydney Wanderers – 2019–20
- Nicolai Müller – Western Sydney Wanderers – 2019–21, Central Coast Mariners – 2021–2022
- Georg Niedermeier – Melbourne Victory – 2018–19
- Dragan Paljić – Perth Glory – 2015
- Peter Perchtold – Gold Coast United – 2011
- Jérome Polenz – Western Sydney Wanderers – 2012–14, Brisbane Roar – 2015–16
- Matti Steinmann – Wellington Phoenix – 2019–20, Brisbane Roar – 2021–22
- Marcus Wedau – Queensland Roar – 2006–07
- **Philipp Ziereis** – **Melbourne Victory** – 2026–

== Ghana ==
- Paul Ayongo – Central Coast Mariners – 2022–23
- Hamza Mohammed – New Zealand Knights – 2006
- Lloyd Owusu – Adelaide United – 2009–10

== Greece ==
- Panagiotis Kone – Western United – 2019–20
- Avraam Papadopoulos – Brisbane Roar – 2017–19
- Savvas Siatravanis – Newcastle Jets – 2021–22
- Nectarios Triantis – Western Sydney Wanderers – 2021–22, Central Coast Mariners – 2022–23
- **Nikos Vergos** – Melbourne Victory – 2024–26, **Newcastle Jets** – 2026–
- Georgios Vrakas – Brisbane Roar – 2025–26

== Hungary ==
- György Sándor – Perth Glory – 2015–16
- Krisztián Vadócz – Perth Glory – 2016
- Richárd Vernes – Central Coast Mariners – 2014–15

== Indonesia ==
- Syahrian Abimanyu – Newcastle Jets – 2021
- Rafael Struick – Brisbane Roar – 2024–25
- Sergio van Dijk – Brisbane Roar – 2008–10, Adelaide United – 2010–13
- **Luke Vickery** – Western United – 2024–25, **Macarthur FC** – 2025–

== Iran ==
- Reza Ghoochannejhad – Sydney FC – 2019

== Iraq ==
- Ali Abbas – Newcastle Jets – 2009–12, 2020–21, Sydney FC – 2012–16, Wellington Phoenix – 2017–18
- Mohamed Al-Taay – Newcastle Jets – 2021–23, Wellington Phoenix – 2023–25, Western Sydney Wanderers – 2025–26
- **Charbel Shamoon** – Western United – 2024–25, **Perth Glory** – 2025–

== Ireland ==
- Simon Cox – Western Sydney Wanderers – 2020–21
- Sean Devine – New Zealand Knights – 2005–07
- Damien Duff – Melbourne City – 2014–15
- Steven Gray – Melbourne Heart – 2012–13
- Wes Hoolahan – Newcastle Jets – 2019–20
- Andy Keogh – Perth Glory – 2014–19, 2020–22
- Stephen Mallon – Central Coast Mariners – 2019
- Aaron McEneff – Perth Glory – 2022–24
- Billy Mehmet – Perth Glory – 2011–13
- Liam Miller – Perth Glory – 2011–13, Brisbane Roar – 2013–14, Melbourne City – 2014
- Roy O'Donovan – Central Coast Mariners – 2015–17, Newcastle Jets – 2017–19, 2020–21, Brisbane Roar – 2019–20
- Wayne O'Sullivan – Central Coast Mariners – 2005–07
- **Joe Shaughnessy** – **Newcastle Jets** – 2025–
- Cillian Sheridan – Wellington Phoenix – 2019
- Shaun Timmins – Wellington Phoenix – 2014

== Israel ==
- Ben Azubel – Perth Glory – 2022
- Yonatan Cohen – Melbourne City – 2024–25
- Tomer Hemed – Wellington Phoenix – 2020–21, Western Sydney Wanderers – 2021–22

== Italy ==
- Benito Carbone – Sydney FC – 2006
- Alessandro Del Piero – Sydney FC – 2012–14
- Alessandro Diamanti – Western United – 2019–23
- Marcello Fiorentini – Newcastle Jets – 2010–11
- Massimo Maccarone – Brisbane Roar – 2017–18
- Francesco Margiotta – Melbourne Victory – 2021–22
- Andrea Migliorini – Melbourne Heart – 2013–14
- Federico Piovaccari – Western Sydney Wanderers – 2015–16
- Manuel Pucciarelli – Melbourne City – 2021–22
- Marco Rossi – Wellington Phoenix – 2016–18
- Fabio Vignaroli – Newcastle Jets – 2009–10

== Ivory Coast ==
- Kévin Boli – Macarthur FC – 2025
- Eugène Dadi – Perth Glory – 2008–10, Wellington Phoenix – 2010
- Jonas Salley – New Zealand Knights – 2006–07, Sydney FC 2007, Adelaide United – 2007–09, Gold Coast United – 2011–12
- **Adama Traoré** – Gold Coast United – 2009–12, **Melbourne Victory** – 2012–14, 2019–21, 2023–, Western Sydney Wanderers – 2021–23

== Jamaica ==
- Adrian Mariappa – Macarthur FC – 2021–22

== Japan ==
- Hiroaki Aoyama – Perth Glory – 2024–25
- Riku Danzaki – Brisbane Roar – 2020–21, 2022–23, Western United – 2023–25
- Tsubasa Endoh – Melbourne City – 2022
- Cy Goddard – Central Coast Mariners – 2021–22
- Keisuke Honda – Melbourne Victory – 2018–19
- **Hiroshi Ibusuki** – Adelaide United – 2022–24, Western United – 2024–25, **Western Sydney Wanderers** – 2026–
- Tomoki Imai – Western United – 2020–25
- Hiroyuki Ishida – Perth Glory – 2005–06
- Hideki Ishige – Wellington Phoenix – 2024–26
- Kojiro Kaimoto – North Queensland Fury – 2009
- **Takeshi Kanamori** – **Melbourne City** – 2025–
- Masato Kudo – Brisbane Roar – 2020–21
- Jumpei Kusukami – Western Sydney Wanderers – 2016–18
- Yuto Misao – Perth Glory – 2025
- Kazuyoshi Miura – Sydney FC – 2005
- Kota Mizunuma – Newcastle Jets – 2025–26
- Hirofumi Moriyasu – Sydney FC – 2010–12
- Ryo Nagai – Perth Glory – 2012–14
- **Kazuki Nagasawa** – **Wellington Phoenix** – 2024–
- **Tatsuki Nara** – **Macarthur FC** – 2026–
- **Charles Nduka** – **Melbourne Victory** – 2026–
- Keijiro Ogawa – Western Sydney Wanderers – 2021–22
- Takuya Okamoto – Perth Glory – 2025
- Shinji Ono – Western Sydney Wanderers – 2012–14
- Kosuke Ota – Perth Glory – 2020–22
- Manabu Saitō – Newcastle Jets – 2023
- **Hiroki Sakai** – **Auckland FC** – 2024–
- **Takahiro Sekine** – **Sydney FC** – 2026–
- Yojiro Takahagi – Western Sydney Wanderers – 2015
- Yuji Takahashi – Brisbane Roar – 2012–13
- Yūsuke Tanaka – Western Sydney Wanderers – 2015
- Kaito Taniguchi – Central Coast Mariners – 2026
- Naoki Tsubaki – Melbourne City – 2020–21
- Ryo Wada – Brisbane Roar – 2022

== Kenya ==
- William Wilson – Melbourne Victory – 2021–23, Central Coast Mariners – 2023–25

== Kosovo ==
- Besart Berisha – Brisbane Roar – 2011–14, Melbourne Victory – 2014–18, Western United – 2019–21
- Valon Berisha – Melbourne City – 2022–23
- Elbasan Rashani – Melbourne City – 2025–26

== Lebanon ==
- Austin Ayoubi – Adelaide United – 2023–26
- Khoder Kaddour – Western United – 2024–25
- Ramy Najjarine – Melbourne City – 2018–20, Newcastle Jets – 2020–21, Western Sydney Wanderers – 2021–23, Western United – 2023–25, Wellington Phoenix – 2025–26
- Walid Shour – Brisbane Roar – 2024–25

== Liberia ==
- Patrick Gerhardt – Melbourne Heart – 2012–14

== Lithuania ==
- Darvydas Šernas – Perth Glory – 2014

== Malaysia ==
- Matthew Davies – Perth Glory – 2013–15
- Brendan Gan – Sydney FC – 2008–11
- Liridon Krasniqi – Newcastle Jets – 2021
- Brad Tapp – Central Coast Mariners – 2022–26

== Mali ==
- Kalifa Cissé – Central Coast Mariners – 2018–19
- Tongo Doumbia – Western United – 2022–23

== Malta ==
- Trent Buhagiar – Central Coast Mariners – 2016–18, Sydney FC – 2018–2022, Newcastle Jets – 2022–2024
- John Hutchinson – Central Coast Mariners – 2005–15
- Michael Mifsud – Melbourne Heart – 2013–14
- Manny Muscat – Wellington Phoenix – 2008–16, Melbourne City – 2016–18

== Martinique ==
- Harry Novillo – Melbourne City – 2015–16

== Mauritius ==
- Jonathan Bru – Melbourne Victory – 2012–14

== Mexico ==
- Ulises Dávila – Wellington Phoenix – 2019–21, Macarthur FC – 2021–24
- **Rafael Durán** – Macarthur FC – 2025–26, **Wellington Phoenix** – 2026–
- Gael Sandoval – Wellington Phoenix – 2022

== Moldova ==
- **Virgiliu Postolachi** – **Brisbane Roar** – 2026–

== Morocco ==
- Anas Ouahim – Sydney FC – 2024–25
- Hamza Sakhi – Melbourne City – 2023–24

== Netherlands ==
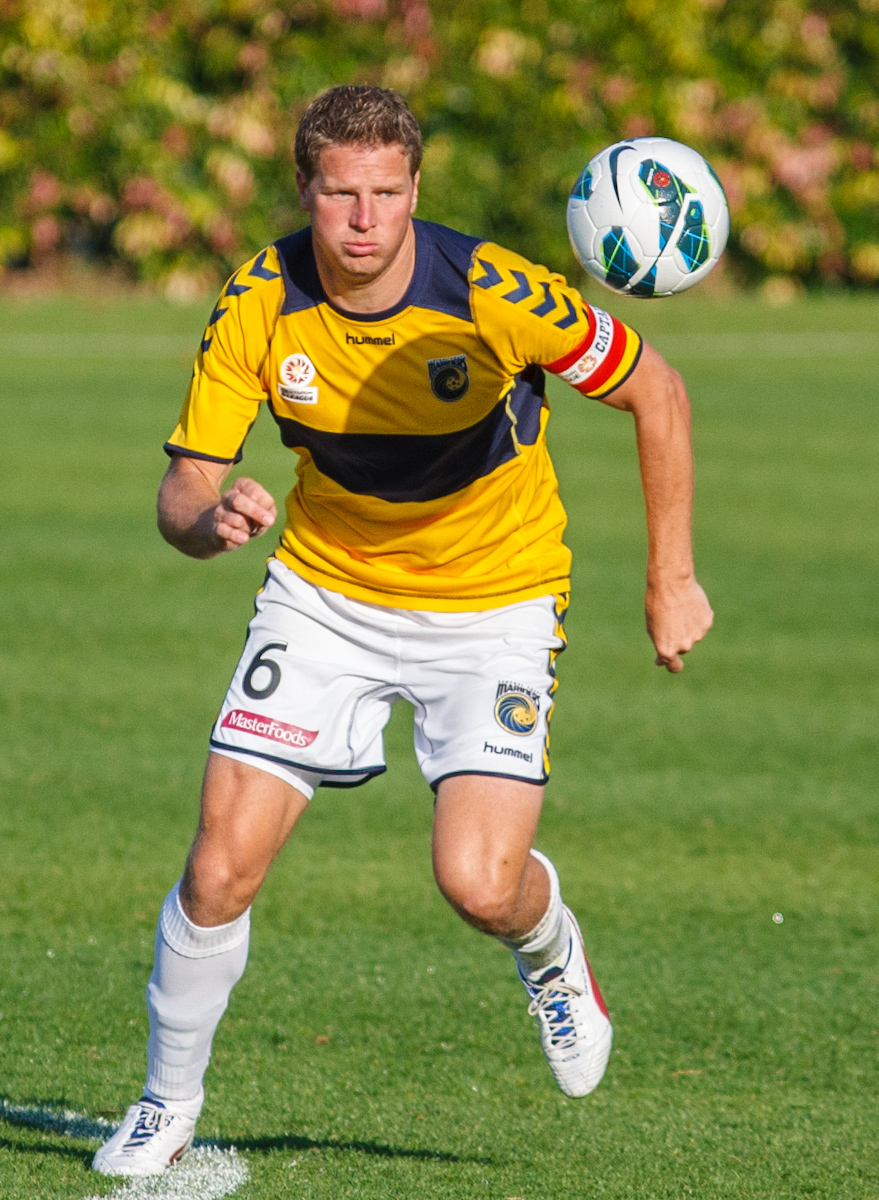
Patrick Zwaanswijk won an A-League Championship with Central Coast Mariners.

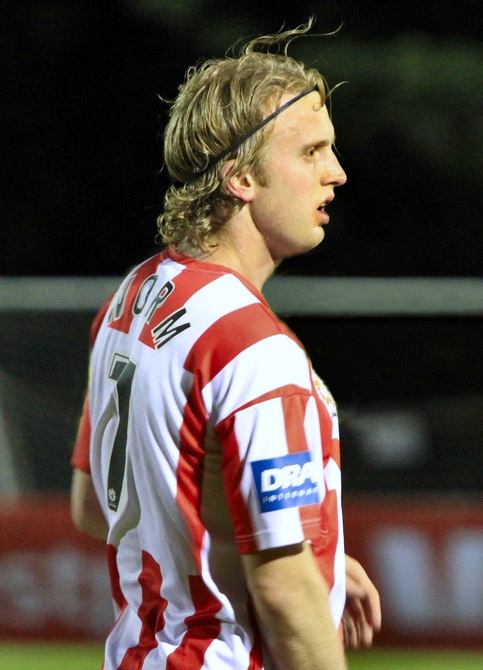
Rutger Worm was Melbourne Heart's first international signing.

- Paul Beekmans – Gold Coast United – 2011–12
- Pascal Bosschaart – Sydney FC – 2011–13
- Wout Brama – Central Coast Mariners – 2017–18
- Jordy Buijs – Sydney FC – 2017–18
- Romeo Castelen – Western Sydney Wanderers – 2014–16
- Donny de Groot – Newcastle Jets – 2009–10
- Siem de Jong – Sydney FC – 2018–19
- Orlando Engelaar – Melbourne Heart – 2013–14
- Leroy George – Melbourne Victory – 2017–18
- Jorrit Hendrix – Western Sydney Wanderers – 2023–24
- Youssouf Hersi – Western Sydney Wanderers – 2012–14, Perth Glory – 2014–15
- Tom Hiariej – Central Coast Mariners – 2017–19
- Kew Jaliens – Newcastle Jets – 2013–15, Melbourne City – 2015
- Peter Jungschläger – Gold Coast United – 2011–12
- Marcel Meeuwis – Melbourne Heart – 2013
- Luciano Narsingh – Sydney FC – 2022
- Stef Nijland – Brisbane Roar – 2013
- Bobby Petta – Adelaide United – 2006–08, Sydney FC – 2008
- Maceo Rigters – Gold Coast United – 2011–12
- Jeffrey Sarpong – Wellington Phoenix – 2015–16
- Bart Schenkeveld – Melbourne City – 2017–19
- Marcel Seip – Central Coast Mariners – 2013–14
- Gerald Sibon – Melbourne Heart – 2010–11
- Victor Sikora – Perth Glory – 2009–12
- Andwélé Slory – Adelaide United – 2011
- **Joshua Smits** – **Adelaide United** – 2025–
- Jordy Thomassen – Adelaide United – 2019
- Bas van den Brink – Gold Coast United – 2009–11, Perth Glory – 2011–13
- Jop van der Linden – Sydney FC – 2018–19
- Richard van der Venne – Melbourne City – 2022–23
- Frank van Eijs – New Zealand Knights – 2005–06
- **Bart Vriends** – **Adelaide United** – 2024–
- Rob Wielaert – Melbourne City – 2013–15
- Rutger Worm – Melbourne Heart – 2010–12
- Patrick Zwaanswijk – Central Coast Mariners – 2010–13

== Nigeria ==
- Seyi Adeleke – Western Sydney Wanderers – 2014–15
- Ifeanyi Eze – Wellington Phoenix – 2025–26
- Kelechi John – Central Coast Mariners – 2022–23
- Josh Oluwayemi – Wellington Phoenix – 2024–26
- **Oriola Sunday** – **Sydney FC** – 2026–

== Northern Ireland ==
- Bobby Burns – Newcastle Jets – 2019–20
- Aaron Hughes – Melbourne City – 2015–16
- Alfie McCalmont – Central Coast Mariners – 2024–26
- Terry McFlynn – Sydney FC – 2005–14
- Jonny Steele – Newcastle Jets – 2014

== North Macedonia ==
- Daniel Georgievski – Melbourne Victory – 2014–17, Newcastle Jets – 2017–19, Western Sydney Wanderers – 2019–21, Melbourne City – 2021
- Mensur Kurtiši – Brisbane Roar – 2014–15

== Norway ==
- Sander Kartum – Wellington Phoenix – 2026
- Marius Lode – Brisbane Roar – 2026
- **Daniel Normann** – **Auckland FC** – 2026–
- Kristian Opseth – Adelaide United – 2019–20

== Panama ==
- Abdiel Arroyo – Newcastle Jets – 2019–20
- Ricardo Clarke – Wellington Phoenix – 2012
- Yairo Yau – Sydney FC – 2012–14

== Papua New Guinea ==
- Brad McDonald – North Queensland Fury – 2010–11, Central Coast Mariners – 2011–13; 2016–17

== Paraguay ==
- Fernando Romero – Melbourne Victory – 2023

== Peru ==
- Piero Quispe – Sydney FC – 2025–26

== Philippines ==
- Iain Ramsay – Sydney FC – 2009–10, Adelaide United – 2010–13, Melbourne City 2013–15

== Poland ==
- Marcin Budziński – Melbourne City – 2017–18
- Michał Janota – Central Coast Mariners – 2020–21
- Patryk Klimala – Sydney FC – 2024–25
- Michał Kopczyński – Wellington Phoenix – 2018–19
- Filip Kurto – Wellington Phoenix – 2018–19, Western United – 2019–21, Macarthur FC – 2021–26
- Adrian Mierzejewski – Sydney FC – 2017–18
- Oskar Zawada – Wellington Phoenix – 2022–24

== Portugal ==
- Asumah Abubakar – Brisbane Roar – 2025
- Fábio Ferreira – Adelaide United – 2012–15, Central Coast Mariners – 2015–17, Sydney FC – 2018, Perth Glory – 2018–19
- Francisco Geraldes – Wellington Phoenix – 2025
- Roderick Miranda – Melbourne Victory – 2021–26
- Nani – Melbourne Victory – 2022–23
- Nuno Reis – Melbourne City – 2021–24
- Dani Rodrigues – New Zealand Knights – 2006–07

== Romania ==
- Lucian Goian – Perth Glory – 2017

== Scotland ==
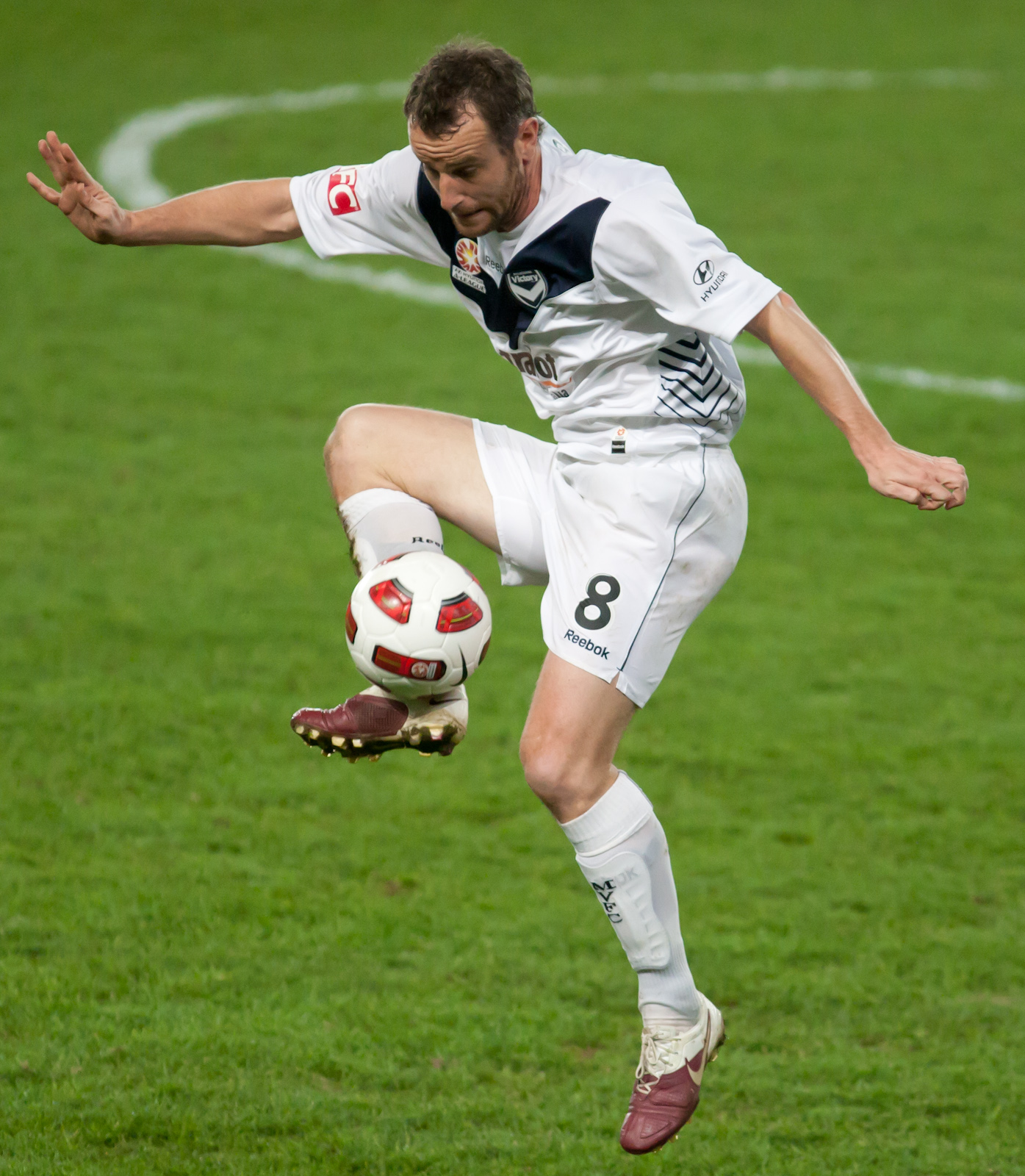
Melbourne Victory midfielder Grant Brebner, winner of two Premiership Championship doubles with his club

- **Tom Aldred** – **Brisbane Roar** – 2019–24, 2026–
- **Max Anderson** – **Wellington Phoenix** – 2026–
- Marc Anthony – Perth Glory – 2008–09
- Grant Brebner – Melbourne Victory – 2006–12
- Chris Doig – Central Coast Mariners – 2009–11
- Graham Dorrans – Western Sydney Wanderers – 2020–21
- Ian Ferguson – Central Coast Mariners – 2005–06
- **Ryan Fraser** – Western Sydney Wanderers – 2026, **Macarthur FC** – 2026–
- Scot Gemmill – New Zealand Knights – 2006–07
- Ziggy Gordon – Central Coast Mariners – 2019–20, Western Sydney Wanderers – 2020–22
- Jack Hendry – Melbourne City – 2020
- Simon Lynch – Queensland Roar – 2006–08
- Bob Malcolm – Brisbane Roar – 2009–10
- **Noah McCann** – **Central Coast Mariners** – 2026–
- Ross McCormack – Melbourne City – 2017–18, Central Coast Mariners – 2018–19
- Steven McGarry – Perth Glory – 2010–14
- Charlie Miller – Brisbane Roar – 2008–09, Gold Coast United – 2009–10
- Nick Montgomery – Central Coast Mariners – 2012–17
- Michael O'Halloran – Melbourne City – 2018–19
- Stewart Petrie – Central Coast Mariners – 2005–07
- Grant Smith – North Queensland Fury – 2009
- Scott Wilson – North Queensland Fury – 2009–10

== Senegal ==
- Baba Diawara – Adelaide United – 2017–19
- Jacques Faty – Sydney FC – 2015–16, Central Coast Mariners – 2016–17
- Malick Mané – Central Coast Mariners – 2014
- Mickaël Tavares – Sydney FC – 2015–16, Central Coast Mariners – 2016–17

== Serbia ==
- Enver Alivodić – Newcastle Jets – 2015–16
- Ranko Despotović – Sydney FC – 2013–14
- Miloš Dimitrijević – Sydney FC – 2014–17
- Milan Đurić – Central Coast Mariners – 2019–20
- Stefan Janković – Central Coast Mariners – 2020–21
- Branko Jelić – Perth Glory – 2009–11
- Milan Jovanić – Perth Glory – 2005–06
- Andrija Kaluđerović – Brisbane Roar – 2015, Wellington Phoenix – 2017–18
- Matija Ljujić – Wellington Phoenix – 2018
- Nebojša Marinković – Perth Glory – 2014–17
- Miloš Ninković – Sydney FC – 2015–22, Western Sydney Wanderers – 2022–24
- Nikola Petković – Sydney FC – 2013–15
- Aleksandar Prijović – Western United – 2021–23
- Stefan Šćepović – Brisbane Roar – 2023
- Milan Smiljanić – Perth Glory – 2016–17
- Miloš Trifunović – Newcastle Jets – 2015–16

== Singapore ==
- Safuwan Baharudin – Melbourne City – 2015

== Slovakia ==
- Filip Hološko – Sydney FC – 2015–17
- Karol Kisel – Sydney FC – 2009–10, 2011–12
- Róbert Mak – Sydney FC – 2022–24

== Slovenia ==
- Džengis Čavušević – Adelaide United – 2018
- Robert Koren – Melbourne City – 2014–16
- Denis Kramar – Perth Glory – 2015
- Rene Krhin – Western United – 2021–22
- Tomislav Mišura – Newcastle Jets – 2010–11

== Solomon Islands ==
- Henry Fa'arodo – Perth Glory – 2005–06
- Benjamin Totori – Wellington Phoenix – 2012–13

== South Korea ==
- Byun Sung-hwan – Sydney FC – 2009–11, Newcastle Jets – 2011–12
- Danny Choi – Adelaide United – 2016
- Do Dong-hyun – Brisbane Roar – 2012–13
- Jeong Tae-wook – Western Sydney Wanderers – 2024–25
- Ji Dong-won – Macarthur FC – 2025–26
- Kim Eun-sun – Central Coast Mariners – 2019–20
- Kim Jae-sung – Adelaide United – 2017
- Kim Seung-yong – Central Coast Mariners – 2014
- Kim Soo-beom – Perth Glory – 2019–20
- Kim Sung-kil – Gold Coast United – 2011
- Lee Ki-je – Newcastle Jets – 2015
- **Nam Tae-hee – Brisbane Roar** – 2026–
- Seo Hyuk-su – Brisbane Roar – 2005–09
- Shin In-seob – Adelaide United – 2009–11
- Shin Tae-yong – Queensland Roar – 2005
- Song Jin-hyung – Newcastle Jets – 2008–10

== South Sudan ==
- Manyluak Aguek – Western United – 2021, Central Coast Mariners – 2021–22
- Kenny Athiu – Melbourne Victory – 2017–20
- Dor Jok – Central Coast Mariners – 2022–23
- Abraham Majok – Western Sydney Wanderers – 2016–19, Central Coast Mariners – 2019–20
- Yagoub Mustafa – Perth Glory – 2017–18
- **Ajak Riak** – **Adelaide United** – 2026–
- Valentino Yuel – Western United – 2019–20, Newcastle Jets – 2020–22, Western Sydney Wanderers – 2023–24

== Spain ==
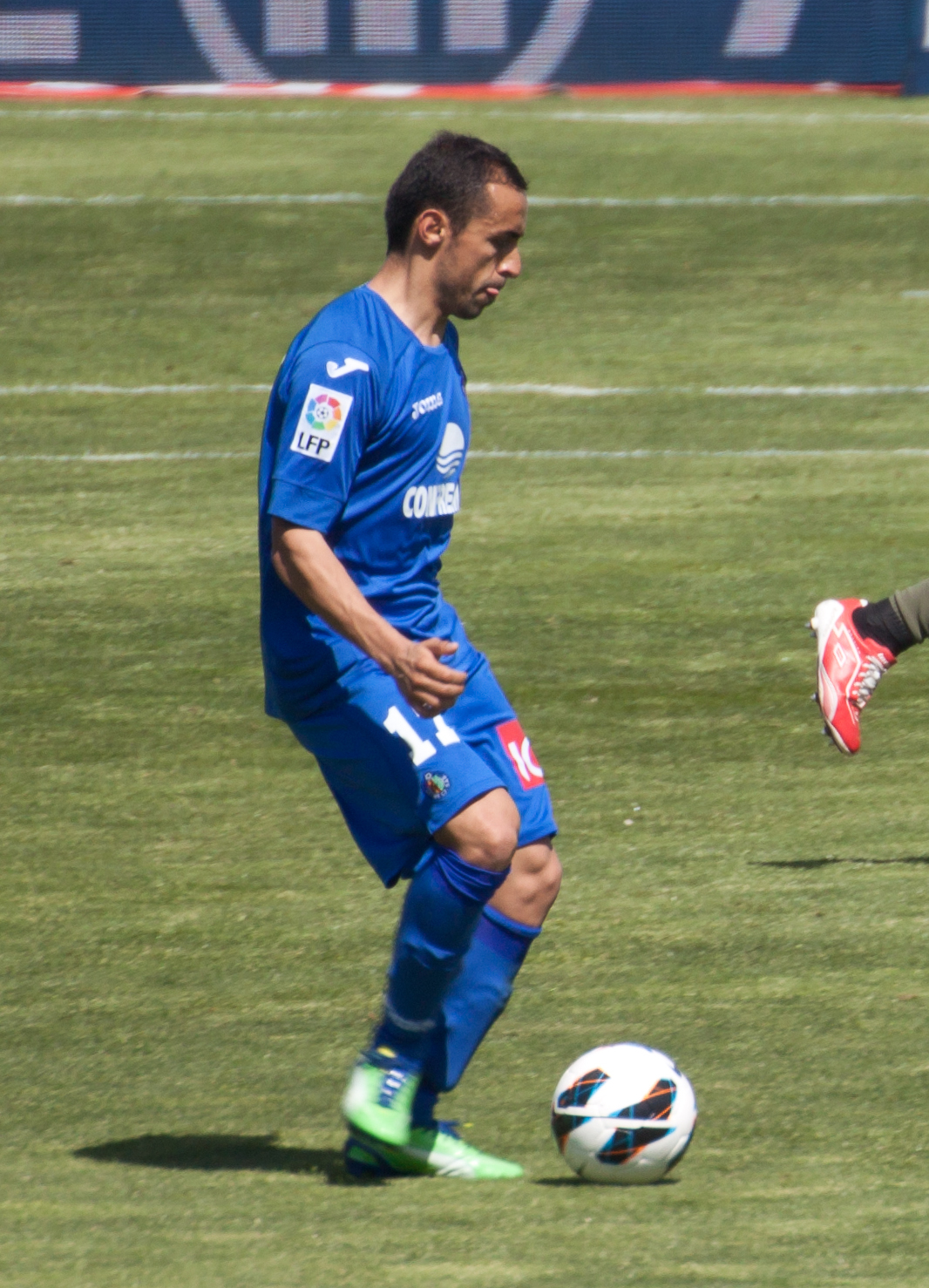
Perth Glory midfielder Diego Castro, winner of the 2016 Johnny Warren Medal

- Alberto – Western Sydney Wanderers – 2015–16
- Andreu – Western Sydney Wanderers – 2015–16, Perth Glory – 2017–18
- Manuel Arana – Brisbane Roar – 2016–17
- Mario Arqués – Newcastle Jets – 2021–22
- Asdrúbal – Central Coast Mariners – 2017–18
- Raúl Baena – Melbourne Victory – 2018–19
- Alan Baró – Melbourne Victory – 2016–17, Central Coast Mariners – 2017–18
- Beñat – Macarthur FC – 2020–21
- Aritz Borda – Western Sydney Wanderers – 2016–17
- Diego Caballo – Sydney FC – 2022–23
- Cadete – Melbourne Victory – 2022–23
- **Víctor Campuzano** – **Sydney FC** – 2025–
- Diego Castro – Perth Glory – 2015–21
- Álvaro Cejudo – Western Sydney Wanderers – 2017–18
- Sergio Cirio – Adelaide United – 2013–17
- Corona – Brisbane Roar – 2015–16
- Dimas – Western Sydney Wanderers – 2015–17
- Luis García – Central Coast Mariners – 2016
- Sergi Guardiola – Adelaide United – 2016–17
- Iker Guarrotxena – Western United – 2021
- Javier Hervás – Brisbane Roar – 2015–16
- Juande – Perth Glory – 2018–20, Adelaide United – 2021–23
- Raúl Llorente – Western Sydney Wanderers – 2017–19
- Álex López – Brisbane Roar – 2018–19
- Javi López – Adelaide United – 2020–25
- Ubay Luzardo – Melbourne Victory – 2012
- Juan Mata – Western Sydney Wanderers – 2024–25, Melbourne Victory – 2025–26
- Mandi – Wellington Phoenix – 2018–19
- Rai Marchán – Melbourne Victory – 2021–24
- Tomás Mejías – Western Sydney Wanderers – 2021–22
- **Juan Muñiz** – **Adelaide United** – 2025–
- Miguel Palanca – Adelaide United – 2015
- Albert Riera – Wellington Phoenix – 2013–16
- Oriol Riera – Western Sydney Wanderers – 2017–19
- Alex Rodriguez – Wellington Phoenix – 2014–17
- Dani Sánchez – Wellington Phoenix – 2011–13
- Pablo Sánchez – Adelaide United – 2014–16
- Víctor Sánchez – Western United – 2020–21
- Adrián Sardinero – Perth Glory – 2021–23
- Markel Susaeta – Melbourne City – 2020, Macarthur FC – 2020–21
- Xavi Torres – Perth Glory – 2017–18
- David Villa – Melbourne City – 2014

== Sri Lanka ==
- Wade Dekker – Melbourne City – 2015–16
- Jack Hingert – North Queensland Fury – 2009–11, Brisbane Roar – 2011–25

== Sudan ==
- Mohamed Adam – Western Sydney Wanderers – 2019–20

== Sweden ==
- Marcus Antonsson – Western Sydney Wanderers – 2023–25
- Ola Toivonen – Melbourne Victory – 2018–20

== Switzerland ==
- Remo Buess – Queensland Roar – 2005–07
- Grégory Duruz – New Zealand Knights – 2006
- Stephan Keller – Sydney FC – 2009–11
- Léo Lacroix – Western United – 2021–23
- Daniel Lopar – Western Sydney Wanderers – 2019–20
- Dominik Ritter – Newcastle Jets – 2012–13
- Pirmin Schwegler – Western Sydney Wanderers – 2019–20
- Gregory Wüthrich – Perth Glory – 2019–20

== Tanzania ==
- Charles M'Mombwa – Central Coast Mariners – 2018–2019, Macarthur FC – 2020–2024, Newcastle Jets – 2025

== Thailand ==
- Surat Sukha – Melbourne Victory – 2009–11
- Sutee Suksomkit – Melbourne Victory – 2009

== Timor-Leste ==
- Jesse Pinto – Newcastle Jets – 2009

== Togo ==
- Eric Akoto – North Queensland Fury – 2010–11

== Trinidad and Tobago ==
- Tony Warner – Wellington Phoenix – 2011–12
- Dwight Yorke – Sydney FC – 2005–06

== Tunisia ==
- Fahid Ben Khalfallah – Melbourne Victory – 2014–17, Brisbane Roar – 2017–18
- Saîf-Eddine Khaoui – Macarthur FC – 2025
- Salim Khelifi – Perth Glory – 2022–24, Melbourne Victory – 2024
- Amor Layouni – Western Sydney Wanderers – 2023

== Turkey ==
- Ersan Gülüm – Adelaide United – 2017–18, Western United – 2019–20
- Jem Karacan – Central Coast Mariners – 2019

== Uganda ==
- Eugene Sseppuya – North Queensland Fury – 2010

== Ukraine ==
- Yevhen Levchenko – Adelaide United – 2011–12

== United States ==
- Tyler Boyd – Wellington Phoenix – 2012–15
- **Bryce Duke** – **Wellington Phoenix** – 2026–
- Michael Enfield – Sydney FC – 2007–09
- Jason Romero – Macarthur FC – 2023
- Alex Smith – Wellington Phoenix – 2011–13

== Uruguay ==
- Javier Cabrera – Melbourne City – 2019–20
- Osvaldo Carro – Queensland Roar – 2005–06
- Mateo Corbo – Newcastle Jets – 2005–06
- Adrián Luna – Melbourne City – 2019–21
- **Guillermo May** – Auckland FC – 2024–26, **Melbourne Victory** – 2026–
- Bruno Piñatares – Western Sydney Wanderers – 2016–17
- Francisco Usúcar – Adelaide United – 2011–12

== Vanuatu ==
- Mitch Cooper – Gold Coast United – 2012, Newcastle Jets – 2012–17
- **Brian Kaltak** – Central Coast Mariners – 2022–25, **Perth Glory** – 2025–

== Venezuela ==
- Ronald Vargas – Newcastle Jets – 2017–19

== Vietnam ==
- Khoa Ngo – Perth Glory – 2024–26

== Wales ==
- Aaron Amadi-Holloway – Brisbane Roar – 2019–20
- Matt Crowell – Central Coast Mariners – 2009–10
- **Tom Lawrence** – **Perth Glory** – 2025–
- **Tom Lockyer** – **Melbourne Victory** – 2026–
- Joe Ledley – Newcastle Jets – 2020

== See also ==
- A-League Men records and statistics
- List of foreign A-League Men goalscorers

== Notes ==
1. Born in Albania
2. Born in Australia
3. Born in Bosnia and Herzegovina (then part of Yugoslavia)
4. Born in Canada
5. Born in Cyprus
6. Born in Democratic Republic of the Congo
7. Born in Dominica
8. Born in England
9. Born in Ethiopia
10. Born in France
11. Born in Germany
12. Born in Ghana
13. Born in Kenya
14. Born in Kosovo (then part of SFR Yugoslavia)
15. Born in the Maldives
16. Born in the Netherlands
17. Born in New Zealand
18. Born in Northern Ireland
19. Born in Russia (then part of the Soviet Union)
20. Born in Sierra Leone
21. Born in South Sudan (then part of Sudan)
22. Born in Switzerland
23. Born in Sudan
24. Born in Suriname
25. Born in Sweden
26. Born in Syria
27. Born in Ukraine (then part of the Soviet Union)
28. Born in United States of America
29. Capped for the Albania national football team
30. Capped for the Albania national under-21 football team
31. Capped for the Australia national under-17 soccer team
32. Capped for the Australia national under-19 soccer team
33. Capped for the Australia national under-20 soccer team
34. Capped for the Australia national under-23 soccer team
35. Capped for the England national under-16 football team
36. Capped for the Finland national under-21 football team
37. Capped for the France national under-18 football team
38. Capped for the France national under-19 football team
39. Capped for the France national under-21 football team
40. Capped for the Kosovo national football team
41. Capped for the Netherlands national under-19 football team
42. Capped for the New Zealand national football team
43. Capped for the Norway national football team
44. Capped for the Norway national under-21 football team
45. Capped for the Singapore national under-22 football team
46. Capped for the Switzerland national under-18 football team
47. Capped for the Switzerland national under-21 football team
48. Capped for the Turkey national under-21 football team
49. Has received Australian citizenship, but is not eligible to represent the national team due to having represented another country's youth team before receiving Australian nationality
50. Has received Australian citizenship, but having spent less than 5 years living in the country is not eligible to represent the national team
