= List of foreign A-League Men goalscorers =

This is a list of foreign goalscorers in the A-League Men, which commenced play in 2005. The following players must meet both of the following two criteria:

1. Have scored at least one A-League Men goal (including finals). Players who were signed by A-League Men clubs, but only scored in cup and/or continental games, or did not score any competitive goals at all, are not included.
2. Are considered foreign, i.e., outside Australia and New Zealand determined by the following:

A player is considered foreign if he is not eligible to play for the national team of Australia or New Zealand.

More specifically,

- If a player has been capped on international level, the national team is used; if he has been capped by more than one country, the highest level (or the most recent) team is used. These include Australia/New Zealand players with dual citizenship.
- If a player has not been capped on international level, his country of birth is used, except those who were born abroad from Australian parents or moved to Australia at a young age, and those who clearly indicated to have switched his nationality to another nation.

Players listed are those who have scored at least one A-League Men goal. Note that calendar years are used. This follows general practice in expressing years a player spent at club.

Statistics correct as of 7 November 2026.

== Albania ==
- Migjen Basha — Melbourne Victory (1)

== Argentina ==
- Fernandon Brandán — Melbourne City (3)
- Marcelo Carrusca — Adelaide United (25), Melbourne City (0), Western Sydney Wanderers (1)
- Nicolás Colazo — Melbourne City (4)
- Matías Córdoba — Perth Glory (1)
- Germán Ferreyra — Melbourne City (2), Western Sydney Wanderers (0)
- Marcos Flores — Adelaide United (8), Melbourne Victory (4), Central Coast Mariners (3), Newcastle Jets (1)
- Jonatan Germano — Melbourne City (7)
- Juan Lescano – Brisbane Roar (6)
- Nicolas Martinez — Western Sydney Wanderers (4)
- Jerónimo Neumann — Adelaide United (16), Newcastle Jets (3)
- Patricio Perez — Central Coast Mariners (6)
- Patito Rodríguez — Newcastle Jets (1)
- Adrian Trinidad — Perth Glory (3)

== Austria ==
- Kristijan Dobras — Melbourne Victory (2)
- Andreas Kuen — Melbourne City (4)
- Marc Janko — Sydney FC (16)
- Richard Kitzbichler — Melbourne Victory (5)

== Bahrain ==
- Sayed Mohamed Adnan — Brisbane Roar (1)

== Barbados ==
- Paul Ifill – Wellington Phoenix (33)

== Belgium ==
- Ritchie De Laet — Melbourne City (7)
- Stein Huysegems — Wellington Phoenix (15)
- Louis Verstraete — Auckland FC (4)

== Benin ==
- Rudy Gestede — Melbourne Victory (5)

== Bosnia and Herzegovina ==
- Sulejman Krpić — Western Sydney Wanderers (2)

== Brazil ==
- Alemão – Adelaide United (3)
- Andrezinho – Perth Glory (2)
- Anselmo – Adelaide United (2)
- Ronald Barcellos – Central Coast Mariners (1)
- Bobô – Sydney FC (59)
- Bruno Cazarine — Sydney FC (17)
- Claudinho – Melbourne Victory (1)
- Cristiano – Adelaide United (11)
- Douglas Costa – Sydney FC (4)
- Denni — Newcastle Jets (1)
- Diego – Adelaide United (1), Wellington Phoenix (0)
- Mikael Doka – Central Coast Mariners (6)
- Ney Fabiano – Melbourne Victory (6)
- Fabinho – Melbourne Victory (1), Sydney FC (0)
- Vitor Feijão – Central Coast Mariners (1)
- Felipe – Wellington Phoenix (3)
- Gui Finkler – Melbourne Victory (20), Wellington Phoenix (7)
- Fred — Melbourne Victory (4), Wellington Phoenix (1), Melbourne Heart (3)
- Fábio Gomes – Sydney FC (11)
- Jair – Newcastle Jets (2), Central Coast Mariners (1)
- Leonardo – Newcastle Jets (1)
- Marcelo – Western Sydney Wanderers (3)
- Marcinho – Queensland Roar (3)
- Maycon – Melbourne Heart (1)
- Moresche – Central Coast Mariners (4)
- Léo Natel - Melbourne City (6)
- Patrick – Sydney FC (2)
- Daniel Penha – Newcastle Jets (4), Western United (7)
- Reinaldo — Brisbane Roar (24)
- Ricardinho – Melbourne Victory (2)
- Robson – Gold Coast United (3)
- Romário – Adelaide United (1)
- Matheus Rossetto – Melbourne City (1)
- Santos – Melbourne Victory (10)
- Yan Sasse — Wellington Phoenix (3)
- Léo Sena – Sydney FC (1)
- Sidnei – Perth Glory (6)
- Alex Terra — Melbourne Heart (7)
- Tiago – Newcastle Jets (1), Sydney FC (0)
- Marco Túlio – Central Coast Mariners (15)

== Bulgaria ==
- Bozhidar Kraev — Wellington Phoenix (13), Western Sydney Wanderers (13)

== Burundi ==
- Elvis Kamsoba — Melbourne Victory (6), Sydney FC (3)
- Pacifique Niyongabire — Adelaide United (1), Perth Glory (0)

== Cameroon ==
- Olivier Boumal – Newcastle Jets (4)

== Canada ==
- Manjrekar James – Wellington Phoenix (2)
- Alen Marcina – New Zealand Knights (2)
- Issey Nakajima-Farran – Brisbane Roar (4)

== Chile ==
- Felipe Gallegos — Auckland FC (2)

== China ==
- Gao Leilei – New Zealand Knights (1), Wellington Phoenix (0)
- Ma Leilei – Newcastle Jets (1)
- Qu Shengqing – Adelaide United (8)
- Zhang Shuo – Newcastle Jets (1)
- Zhang Xiaobin – New Zealand Knights (1)

== Colombia ==
- Neyder Moreno — Auckland FC (8)
- Milton Rodríguez – Newcastle Jets (7)
- Ángel Torres – Central Coast Mariners (13)

== Costa Rica ==
- Kenny Cunningham – Wellington Phoenix (11)
- Carlos Hernández – Melbourne Victory (36), Wellington Phoenix (7)
- Youstin Salas – Wellington Phoenix (0), Brisbane Roar (1)
- Jean Carlos Solórzano – Brisbane Roar (17), Melbourne Victory (0)
- Marco Ureña – Central Coast Mariners (12)

== Croatia ==
- Marin Jakoliš – Melbourne City (2), Macarthur FC (10)
- Dino Kresinger – Western Sydney Wanderers (2)
- Goran Paracki – Wellington Phoenix (1)
- Mateo Poljak – Western Sydney Wanderers (3), Newcastle Jets (3)
- Josip Tadić – Melbourne Heart (6)

== Curaçao ==
- Roly Bonevacia – Wellington Phoenix (14), Western Sydney Wanderers (8), Melbourne Victory (1)
- Dyron Daal – North Queensland Fury (7)
- Guyon Fernandez — Perth Glory (1)
- Darryl Lachman – Perth Glory (2)

== Denmark ==
- Johan Absalonsen – Adelaide United (6)
- Ken Ilsø – Adelaide United (3)
- Michael Jakobsen – Melbourne City (1), Adelaide United (1)
- Thomas Kristensen – Brisbane Roar (6)
- Emiliano Marcondes – Melbourne City (1)
- Tobias Mikkelsen – Brisbane Roar (3)
- Morten Nordstrand – Newcastle Jets (7)

== DR Congo ==
- Yeni Ngbakoto — Western Sydney Wanderers (4)
- Marcel Tisserand – Sydney FC (2)

== Ecuador ==
- Edson Montaño – Newcastle Jets (6)

== England ==
- Luke Amos – Perth Glory (1)
- Charlie Austin — Brisbane Roar (2)
- David Ball — Wellington Phoenix (15)
- Mark Beevers – Perth Glory (3)
- Michael Bridges — Sydney FC (2), Newcastle Jets (11)
- Wayne Brown — Newcastle Jets (2)
- Malik Buari — New Zealand Knights (2)
- Jacob Butterfield – Melbourne Victory (3)
- Zach Clough – Adelaide United (19), Newcastle Jets (0)
- Terry Cooke — North Queensland Fury (1)
- Sam Cosgrove — Auckland FC (12)
- John Curits — Gold Coast United (1)
- Brian Deane — Perth Glory (1)
- Matt Derbyshire – Macarthur FC (14)
- Ryan Edmondson — Central Coast Mariners (6)
- Neil Emblen — New Zealand Knights (3)
- Robbie Fowler — North Queensland Fury (9), Perth Glory (9)
- Macaulay Gillesphey — Brisbane Roar (4)
- Chris Greenacre — Wellington Phoenix (19)
- Shayon Harrison — Melbourne City (4)
- Emile Heskey — Newcastle Jets (10)
- Gary Hooper — Wellington Phoenix (12)
- Mark Hughes — North Queensland Fury (4)
- Francis Jeffers — Newcastle Jets (2)
- Carl Jenkinson – Melbourne City (2), Newcastle Jets (0)
- Joe Keenan — Melbourne Victory (0), Adelaide United (1)
- Adam Le Fondre — Sydney FC (62)
- Joe Lolley – Sydney FC (31), Newcastle Jets (0)
- Chris Long — Brisbane Roar (4)
- Callum McManaman — Melbourne Victory (4)
- Joseph Mills — Perth Glory (1)
- Jordon Mutch – Western Sydney Wanderers (2), Macarthur FC (0)
- Craig Noone — Melbourne City (11), Macarthur FC (5)
- James Robinson — Melbourne Victory (1), Perth Glory (2), North Queensland Fury (0)
- Jack Rodwell – Western Sydney Wanderers (3), Sydney FC (1)
- John Sutton — Central Coast Mariners (1)
- Steven Taylor — Wellington Phoenix (3)
- Nicky Travis — Central Coast Mariners (3)
- Ryan Tunnicliffe – Adelaide United (1)
- Scott Wootton – Wellington Phoenix (3), Perth Glory (0)
- Simon Yeo — New Zealand Knights (4)

== Fiji ==
- Roy Krishna — Wellington Phoenix (51)

== Finland ==
- Aleksandr Kokko — Newcastle Jets (1)
- Thomas Lam — Melbourne City (1)
- Juho Mäkelä — Sydney FC (3)

== France ==
- Romain Amalfitano – Western Sydney Wanderers (3)
- Éric Bauthéac — Brisbane Roar (9)
- Florin Berenguer – Melbourne City (10), Brisbane Roar (5)
- Damien Da Silva – Melbourne Victory (5), Macarthur FC (0)
- Matthieu Delpierre – Melbourne Victory (1)
- William Gallas – Perth Glory (1)
- Valère Germain – Macarthur FC (19)
- Zinédine Machach – Melbourne Victory (14)
- Béni Nkololo – Central Coast Mariners (15)
- Loïc Puyo – Macarthur FC (2)
- Morgan Schneiderlin – Western Sydney Wanderers (2)
- Samuel Souprayen – Melbourne City (3)

== Georgia ==
- Bachana Arabuli – Macarthur FC (5)
- Beka Dartsmelia – Newcastle Jets (1)
- Beka Mikeltadze – Newcastle Jets (19)

== Germany ==
- Daniel Adlung — Adelaide United (5)
- Ahmet Arslan – Sydney FC (1)
- Tolgay Arslan – Melbourne City (13)
- Alexander Baumjohann — Western Sydney Wanderers (3), Sydney FC (2)
- Maximilian Beister — Melbourne Victory (1)
- Thomas Broich — Brisbane Roar (21)
- Andre Gumprecht — Central Coast Mariners (3)
- André Kilian — North Queensland Fury (1)
- Sonny Kittel – Western Sydney Wanderers (1)
- Alexander Meier — Western Sydney Wanderers (1)
- Nicolai Müller — Western Sydney Wanderers (7), Central Coast Mariners (2)
- Georg Niedermeier — Melbourne Victory (2)
- Jérome Polenz — Western Sydney Wanderers (2), Brisbane Roar (2)

== Ghana ==
- Paul Ayongo – Central Coast Mariners (1)
- Lloyd Owusu — Adelaide United (1)

== Greece ==
- Panagiotis Kone — Western United (2)
- Avraam Papadopoulos — Brisbane Roar (4)
- Savvas Siatravanis – Newcastle Jets (2)
- Nikos Vergos – Melbourne Victory (14), Newcastle Jets (0)
- Georgios Vrakas – Brisbane Roar (1)

== Hungary ==
- György Sándor — Perth Glory (4)
- Krisztián Vadócz — Perth Glory (1)
- Richárd Vernes — Central Coast Mariners (1)

== Indonesia ==
- Sergio van Dijk — Brisbane Roar (25), Adelaide United (25)
- Rafael Struick – Brisbane Roar (1)
- Luke Vickery – Western United – (1) Macarthur FC – (5)

== Iran ==
- Reza Ghoochannejhad — Sydney FC (1)

== Iraq ==
- Ali Abbas — Newcastle Jets (4), Sydney FC (5), Wellington Phoenix (0)
- Charbel Shamoon — Western United (0), Perth Glory (1)

== Ireland ==
- Simon Cox — Western Sydney Wanderers (5)
- Sean Devine — New Zealand Knights (1)
- Damien Duff — Melbourne City (1)
- Andy Keogh — Perth Glory (59)
- Stephen Mallon — Central Coast Mariners (1)
- Aaron McEneff – Perth Glory (3)
- Billy Mehmet — Perth Glory (10)
- Liam Miller — Perth Glory (2), Brisbane Roar (3), Melbourne City (0)
- Roy O'Donovan — Central Coast Mariners (19), Newcastle Jets (31), Brisbane Roar (6)
- Wayne O'Sullivan — Central Coast Mariners (1)
- Joe Shaughnessy – Newcastle Jets (1)
- Cillian Sheridan — Wellington Phoenix (1)

== Israel ==
- Yonatan Cohen — Melbourne City (6)
- Tomer Hemed — Wellington Phoenix (11), Western Sydney Wanderers (6)

== Italy ==
- Benito Carbone — Sydney FC (2)
- Alessandro Del Piero — Sydney FC (24)
- Alessandro Diamanti — Western United (11)
- Massimo Maccarone — Brisbane Roar (9)
- Francesco Margiotta – Melbourne Victory (4)
- Andrea Migliorini — Melbourne Heart (3)
- Federico Piovaccari — Western Sydney Wanderers (2)

== Ivory Coast ==
- Kévin Boli — Macarthur FC (1)
- Eugene Dadi — Perth Glory (10), Wellington Phoenix (5)
- Adama Traoré — Gold Coast United (3), Melbourne Victory (3), Western Sydney Wanderers (0)

== Jamaica ==
- Adrian Mariappa – Macarthur FC (3)

== Japan ==
- Riku Danzaki – Brisbane Roar (9), Western United (6)
- Cy Goddard – Central Coast Mariners (1)
- Keisuke Honda — Melbourne Victory (7)
- Hiroshi Ibusuki – Adelaide United (28), Western United (10), Western Sydney Wanderers (1)
- Tomoki Imai – Western United (1)
- Hiroyuki Ishida — Perth Glory (1)
- Hideki Ishige – Wellington Phoenix (2)
- Takeshi Kanamori – Melbourne City (1)
- Masato Kudo – Brisbane Roar (1)
- Jumpei Kusukami — Western Sydney Wanderers (4)
- Kazuyoshi Miura — Sydney FC (2)
- Kota Mizunuma – Newcastle Jets (4)
- Hirofumi Moriyasu — Sydney FC (2)
- Ryo Nagai — Perth Glory (4)
- Kazuki Nagasawa – Wellington Phoenix (5)
- Charles Nduka – Melbourne Victory (6)
- Keijiro Ogawa – Western Sydney Wanderers (2)
- Shinji Ono — Western Sydney Wanderers (10)
- Manabu Saitō – Newcastle Jets (1)
- Hiroki Sakai — Auckland FC (4)
- Yojiro Takahagi — Western Sydney Wanderers (2)

== Kenya ==
- William Wilson — Melbourne Victory (0), Central Coast Mariners (1)

== Kosovo ==
- Besart Berisha — Brisbane Roar (48), Melbourne Victory (68), Western United (26)
- Valon Berisha – Melbourne City (1)
- Elbasan Rashani – Melbourne City (1)

== Lebanon ==
- Ramy Najjarine – Melbourne City (1), Newcastle Jets (0), Western Sydney Wanderers (3), Western United (1), Wellington Phoenix (2)

== Liberia ==
- Patrick Gerhardt — Melbourne Heart (1)

== Lithuania ==
- Darvydas Sernas — Perth Glory (1)

== Malaysia ==
- Brendan Gan – Sydney FC (5)
- Brad Tapp – Central Coast Mariners (1)

== Mali ==
- Tongo Doumbia – Western United (2)

== Malta ==
- John Hutchinson – Central Coast Mariners (18)
- Michael Mifsud – Melbourne Heart (1)
- Manny Muscat — Wellington Phoenix (4), Melbourne City (1)

== Martinique ==
- Harry Novillo — Melbourne City (13)

== Mexico ==
- Ulises Dávila — Wellington Phoenix (19), Macarthur FC (19)
- Rafael Durán – Macarthur FC (4), Wellington Phoenix (1)
- Gael Sandoval – Wellington Phoenix (6)

== Morocco ==
- Anas Ouahim — Sydney FC (1)
- Hamza Sakhi — Melbourne City (1)

== Netherlands ==
- Pascal Bosschaart — Sydney FC (1)
- Wout Brama — Central Coast Mariners (2)
- Jordy Buijs — Sydney FC (1)
- Romeo Castelen — Western Sydney Wanderers (9)
- Siem de Jong — Sydney FC (4)
- Orlando Engelaar — Melbourne Heart (5)
- Leroy George — Melbourne Victory (9)
- Jorrit Hendrix — Western Sydney Wanderers (1)
- Youssouf Hersi — Western Sydney Wanderers (8), Perth Glory (0)
- Kew Jaliens — Newcastle Jets (3), Melbourne City (1)
- Peter Jungschlager — Gold Coast United (2)
- Luciano Narsingh – Sydney FC (1)
- Bobby Petta — Adelaide United (1), Sydney FC (0)
- Maceo Rigters — Gold Coast United (4)
- Bart Schenkeveld — Melbourne City (1)
- Gerald Sibon — Melbourne Heart (7)
- Victor Sikora — Perth Glory (4)
- Bas van den Brink — Gold Coast United (4), Perth Glory (1)
- Richard van der Venne — Melbourne City (7)
- Bart Vriends – Adelaide United (2)
- Rob Wielaert — Melbourne City (1)
- Rutger Worm — Melbourne City (2)
- Patrick Zwaanswijk — Central Coast Mariners (11)

== Nigeria ==
- Ifeanyi Eze – Wellington Phoenix (10)
- Oriola Sunday – Sydney FC (1)

== North Macedonia ==
- Daniel Georgievski — Melbourne Victory (3), Newcastle Jets (1), Western Sydney Wanderers (0), Melbourne City (0)
- Mensur Kurtiši — Brisbane Roar (1)

== Northern Ireland ==
- Aaron Hughes — Melbourne City (1)
- Alfie McCalmont — Central Coast Mariners (4)
- Terry McFlynn — Sydney FC (7)

== Norway ==
- Sander Kartum – Wellington Phoenix (2)
- Kristian Opseth — Adelaide United (6)

== Panama ==
- Abdiel Arroyo — Newcastle Jets (2)
- Yairo Yau — Sydney FC (6)

== Paraguay ==
- Fernando Romero – Melbourne Victory (2)

== Peru ==
- Piero Quispe — Sydney FC (2)

== Philippines ==
- Iain Ramsay — Sydney FC (0), Adelaide United (11), Melbourne City (3)

== Poland ==
- Marcin Budziński — Melbourne City (5)
- Patryk Klimala – Sydney FC (11)
- Adrian Mierzejewski — Sydney FC (13)
- Oskar Zawada — Wellington Phoenix (22)

== Portugal ==
- Asumah Abubakar – Brisbane Roar (4)
- Fábio Ferreira — Adelaide United (13), Central Coast Mariners (15), Sydney FC (0), Perth Glory (2)
- Francisco Geraldes – Wellington Phoenix (1)
- Roderick Miranda – Melbourne Victory (5)
- Nuno Reis – Melbourne City (1)

== Scotland ==
- Tom Aldred – Brisbane Roar (4)
- Grant Brebner — Melbourne Victory (6)
- Graham Dorrans – Western Sydney Wanderers (4)
- Ryan Fraser – Western Sydney Wanderers (4), Macarthur FC (1)
- Ziggy Gordon – Central Coast Mariners (0), Western Sydney Wanderers (2)
- Simon Lynch — Queensland Roar (5)
- Ross McCormack — Melbourne City (14), Central Coast Mariners (1)
- Steven McGarry — Perth Glory (11)
- Charlie Miller — Brisbane Roar (8), Gold Coast United (1)
- Nick Montgomery — Central Coast Mariners (3)
- Stewart Petrie — Central Coast Mariners (10)

== Senegal ==
- Baba Diawara — Adelaide United (7)
- Jacques Faty — Sydney FC (2), Central Coast Mariners (0)
- Mickaël Tavares — Sydney FC (1), Central Coast Mariners (0)

== Serbia ==
- Enver Alivodić — Newcastle Jets (2)
- Ranko Despotovic — Sydney FC (6)
- Miloš Dimitrijević — Sydney FC (2)
- Milan Đurić — Central Coast Mariners (5)
- Branko Jelić — Perth Glory (7)
- Andrija Kaluđerović — Brisbane Roar (5), Wellington Phoenix (9)
- Matija Ljujić — Wellington Phoenix (2)
- Nebojša Marinković — Perth Glory (15)
- Miloš Ninković — Sydney FC, (35) Western Sydney Wanderers (0)
- Aleksandar Prijović – Western United (18)
- Stefan Šćepović – Brisbane Roar (1)
- Miloš Trifunović — Newcastle Jets (9)

== Singapore ==
- Safuwan Baharudin — Melbourne City (2)

== Slovakia ==
- Filip Hološko — Sydney FC (18)
- Karol Kisel — Sydney FC (7)
- Róbert Mak — Sydney FC (20)

== Slovenia ==
- Džengis Čavušević — Adelaide United (1)
- Robert Koren — Melbourne City (3)
- Denis Kramar — Perth Glory (1)
- Rene Krhin – Western United (1)

== South Korea ==
- Byun Sung-hwan — Sydney FC (0), Newcastle Jets (2)
- Ji Dong-won – Macarthur FC (1)
- Kim Seung-yong — Central Coast Mariners (3)
- Lee Ki-je — Newcastle Jets (2)
- Nam Tae-hee — Brisbane Roar (1)
- Seo Hyuk-su — Brisbane Roar (2)
- Song Jin-hyung — Newcastle Jets (5)

== South Sudan ==
- Kenny Athiu – Melbourne Victory (1)
- Abraham Majok – Western Sydney Wanderers (2), Central Coast Mariners (0)
- Valentino Yuel – Western United (0), Newcastle Jets (10), Western Sydney Wanderers (1)

== Spain ==
- Alberto — Western Sydney Wanderers (1)
- Andreu — Western Sydney Wanderers (3), Perth Glory (0)
- Asdrúbal — Central Coast Mariners (2)
- Raúl Baena — Melbourne Victory (1)
- Alan Baró — Melbourne Victory (0), Central Coast Mariners (1)
- Aritz Borda — Western Sydney Wanderers (1)
- Diego Caballo — Sydney FC (2)
- Cadete — Melbourne Victory (1)
- Diego Castro — Perth Glory (49)
- Álvaro Cejudo — Western Sydney Wanderers (2)
- Sergio Cirio — Adelaide United (20)
- Víctor Campuzano — Sydney FC (4)
- Corona — Brisbane Roar (2)
- Dimas — Western Sydney Wanderers (3)
- Luis García — Central Coast Mariners (2)
- Sergi Guardiola — Adelaide United (3)
- Iker Guarrotxena – Western United (3)
- Juande — Perth Glory (2), Adelaide United (1)
- Álex López — Brisbane Roar (3)
- Javi López — Adelaide United (4)
- Mandi — Wellington Phoenix (2)
- Juan Mata — Western Sydney Wanderers (1), Melbourne Victory (5)
- Juan Muñiz — Adelaide United (2)
- Miguel Palanca — Adelaide United (1)
- Oriol Riera — Western Sydney Wanderers (25)
- Alex Rodriguez — Wellington Phoenix (1)
- Dani Sánchez — Wellington Phoenix (1)
- Pablo Sánchez — Adelaide United (17)
- Víctor Sánchez – Western United (3)
- Markel Susaeta — Melbourne City (2), Macarthur FC (5)
- Xavi Torres — Perth Glory (4)
- David Villa — Melbourne City (2)

== Sri Lanka ==
- Wade Dekker – Melbourne City (1)
- Jack Hingert – North Queensland Fury (0), Brisbane Roar (4)

== Sudan ==
- Mohamed Adam – Western Sydney Wanderers (1)

== Sweden ==
- Marcus Antonsson – Western Sydney Wanderers (12)
- Ola Toivonen — Melbourne Victory (23)

== Switzerland ==
- Stephan Keller — Sydney FC (1)
- Léo Lacroix — Western United (3)
- Gregory Wüthrich — Perth Glory (1)

== Tanzania ==
- Charles M'Mombwa – Central Coast Mariners – (0), Macarthur FC – (2), Newcastle Jets – (1)

== Trinidad and Tobago ==
- Dwight Yorke — Sydney FC (7)

== Tunisia ==
- Fahid Ben Khalfallah — Melbourne Victory (12), Brisbane Roar (1)
- Salim Khelifi – Perth Glory (3), Melbourne Victory (0)
- Amor Layouni – Western Sydney Wanderers (4)

== Turkey ==
- Jem Karacan — Central Coast Mariners (1)

== Uganda ==
- Eugene Sseppuya – North Queensland Fury (1)

== United States ==
- Tyler Boyd – Wellington Phoenix (4)
- Jason Romero – Macarthur FC (1)
- Alex Smith — Gold Coast United (0), Wellington Phoenix (1)

== Uruguay ==
- Javier Cabrera — Melbourne City (1)
- Adrián Luna — Melbourne City (8)
- Guillermo May — Auckland FC (15), Melbourne Victory (0)

== Vanuatu ==
- Mitch Cooper – Gold Coast United (1), Newcastle Jets (1)
- Brian Kaltak – Central Coast Mariners (3), Perth Glory (1)

== Venezuela ==
- Ronald Vargas — Newcastle Jets (5)

== Vietnam ==
- Khoa Ngo — Perth Glory (1)

== Wales ==
- Aaron Amadi-Holloway — Brisbane Roar (1)
- Tom Lawrence — Perth Glory (6)

== See also ==
- A-League Men records and statistics
- List of foreign A-League Men players

== Notes ==
1. Born in Albania
2. Born in Australia
3. Born in Bosnia and Herzegovina (then part of Yugoslavia)
4. Born in Canada
5. Born in Cyprus
6. Born in Dominica
7. Born in England
8. Born in Ethiopia
9. Born in France
10. Born in Germany
11. Born in Ghana
12. Born in Kenya
13. Born in the Maldives
14. Born in the Netherlands
15. Born in New Zealand
16. Born in Russia (then part of the Soviet Union)
17. Born in South Sudan (then part of Sudan)
18. Born in Sweden
19. Born in Switzerland
20. Born in Suriname
21. Born in Syria
22. Born in Ukraine (then part of the Soviet Union)
23. Born in United States of America
24. Capped for the Albania national football team
25. Capped for the Australia national under-19 soccer team
26. Capped for the Australia national under-20 soccer team
27. Capped for the Australia national under-23 soccer team
28. Capped for the France national under-18 football team
29. Capped for the France national under-19 football team
30. Capped for the France national under-21 football team
31. Capped for the Netherlands national under-19 football team
32. Capped for the New Zealand national football team
33. Capped for the New Zealand national under-20 football team
34. Capped for the Norway national football team
35. Capped for the Singapore national under-22 football team
36. Capped for the Switzerland national under-21 football team
37. Capped for the Turkey national under-21 football team
38. Has received Australian citizenship, but is not eligible to represent the national team due to having represented another country's youth team before receiving Australian nationality
