= Seyi Adeleke =

Nigerian footballer (born 1991)

Personal information
- Full name: Seyi Adeleke
- Date of birth: 17 November 1991 (age 34)
- Place of birth: Lagos, Nigeria
- Height: 1.80 m (5 ft 11 in)
- Positions: Left-back; midfielder

Youth career
- 2007–2011: Lazio

Senior career*
Years	Team	Apps	(Gls)
2011–2015	Lazio U19s	46	(2)
2011–2012	→ Pergocrema (loan)	17	(3)
2012–2013	→ Salernitana (loan)	8	(1)
2013–2014	→ Biel-Bienne (loan)	12	(2)
2014–2015	Western Sydney Wanderers	4	(0)
2016–2017	Arcella	?	(2)
2017–2019	Merit Alsancak Yeşilova		
- * Club domestic league appearances and goals as of 27 September 2017

Seyi Adeleke (born 17 November 1991) is a Nigerian professional footballer who plays as a left-back or midfielder.

He signed his first professional contract for Lazio and was loaned to Pergocrema, Salernitana and FC Biel-Bienne, before moving to Western Sydney Wanderers in 2015. He subsequently returned to Italy to play for Arcella.

== Early life ==
Born in Lagos, Nigeria, Adeleke moved to Italy in 2007 as a teenager.

== Career ==
On 22 August 2015, Adeleke joined Australian club Western Sydney Wanderers. On 7 November 2015, he made his Wanderers debut. He travelled with the club to the 2015 FIFA Club World Cup, and missed his kick in the penalty shoot-out loss to ES Sétif which saw the Wanders finish sixth. On 13 February 2016, it was announced that Adeleke had left Western Sydney Wanderers.

In May 2016 Adeleke signed with Arcella, based in Padua, Italy, playing in Prima Categoria. In 2016, however, Adeleke's Italian residency status came under threat. Needing to be a "professional athlete", as the league in which he was playing (Promozione) was an amateur league, Adeleke's permit was not renewed by the Italian National Olympic Committee. Adeleke appealed this on the grounds that he was receiving payment to play.

== See also ==
- List of foreign A-League players
- List of Western Sydney Wanderers FC players
