= Juul Respen =

Dutch footballer

Personal information
- Date of birth: 17 October 1998 (age 28)
- Place of birth: Geldrop, Netherlands
- Height: 1.80 m (5 ft 11 in)
- Position: Forward

Team information
- Current team: UNA
- Number: 20

Youth career
- VVV-Venlo

Senior career*
Years	Team	Apps	(Gls)
2016–2018	VVV-Venlo	1	(0)
2018–2021	Helmond Sport	38	(2)
2021–2022	EVV	26	(9)
2022–	UNA	87	(18)
- * Club domestic league appearances and goals as of 08:27, 20 July 2025 (UTC)

Juul Respen (born 17 October 1998) is a Dutch footballer who plays as a forward for UNA.

== Club career ==
He made his professional debut in the Eerste Divisie for VVV-Venlo on 4 November 2016 in a game against FC Dordrecht.

Respen ended his professional career in 2021 as part of Helmond Sport. Instead, he began studying to become a teacher and started playing football for Derde Divisie club EVV. On 17 March 2022, UNA announced that Respen would move to the club for the 2022–23 season.
