= Clint Leemans =

Dutch footballer (born 1995)

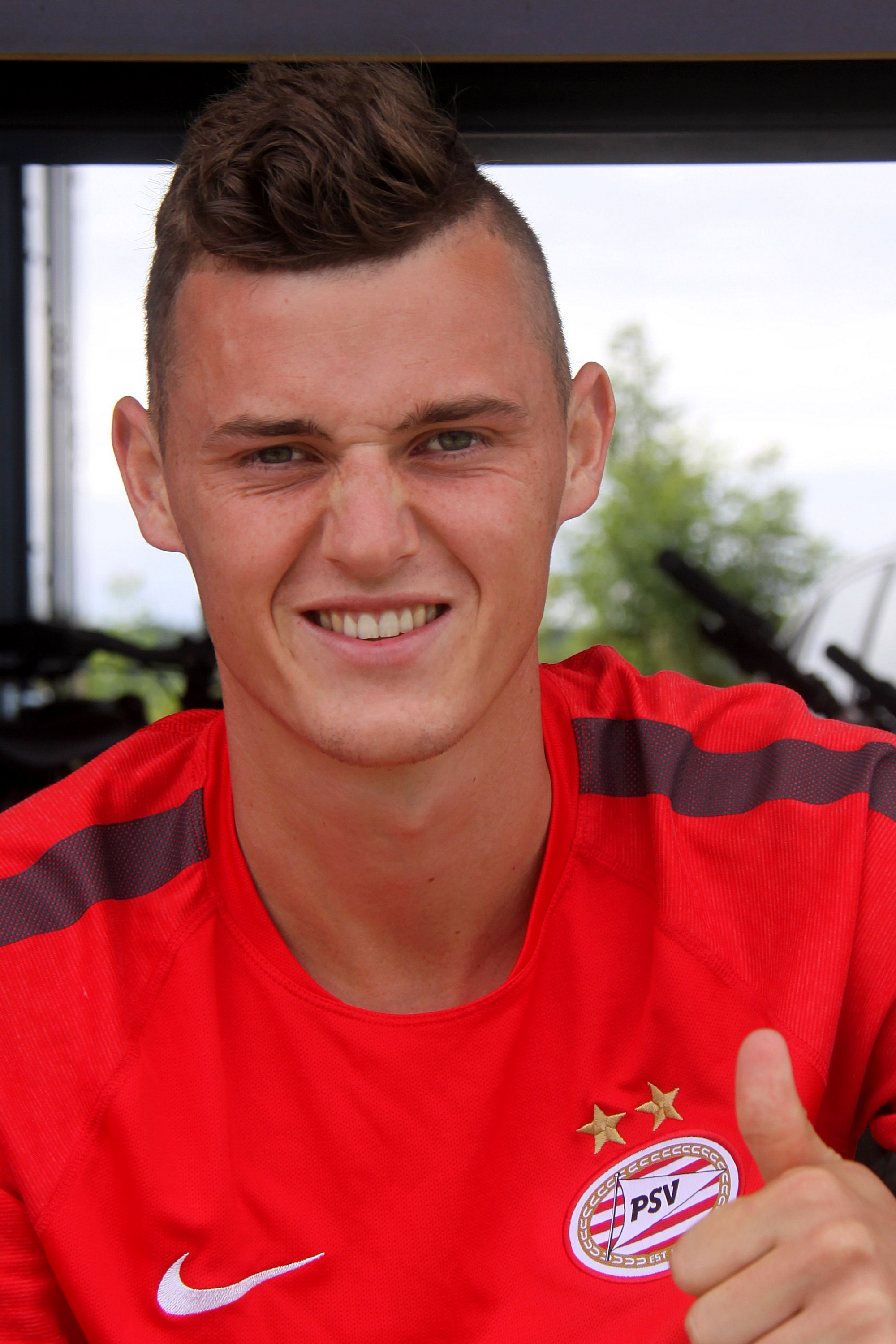
- Leemans in 2014

Personal information
- Date of birth: 15 September 1995 (age 31)
- Place of birth: Veldhoven, Netherlands
- Height: 1.89 m (6 ft 2 in)
- Position: Midfielder

Team information
- Current team: De Graafschap

Youth career
- 1998–2003: RKVVO
- 2003–2013: PSV

Senior career*
Years	Team	Apps	(Gls)
2013–2016	Jong PSV	87	(14)
2016–2018	VVV-Venlo	70	(22)
2018–2021	PEC Zwolle	38	(5)
2019–2020	→ RKC Waalwijk (loan)	21	(4)
2021	→ De Graafschap (loan)	9	(1)
2021–2023	Viborg	63	(9)
2023–2026	NAC Breda	74	(5)
2026–	De Graafschap	0	(0)

International career
2012–2013	Netherlands U18	2	(0)
2013–2014	Netherlands U19	9	(1)
2014	Netherlands U20	4	(0)
2015	Netherlands U21	5	(0)
- * Club domestic league appearances and goals as of 21 May 2026

Clint Leemans (born 15 September 1995) is a Dutch professional footballer who plays as a midfielder for Eerste Divisie club De Graafschap.

== Career ==
Leemans began playing football in the youth of RKVVO in 1998, before moving to the PSV youth academy in 2003. Leemans made his professional debut as Jong PSV player in the second division on 20 September 2013 against FC Den Bosch in a 2–1 away defeat. He came in the field after 81 minutes for Rubén Bentancourt. He's also active as a Dutch youth international.

In the 2020–21 season, he won the "Eredivisie Player of the Month" award for September due to his performances with PEC Zwolle.

Left without contract in July 2021, Leemans moved to Denmark and signed with newly promoted Danish Superliga club Viborg FF on 4 August 2021, signing a deal until the summer 2023. After two seasons, Leemans left the club at the end of his contract in June 2023.

On 11 July 2023, Leemans returned to the Netherlands and signed a three-year contract with NAC Breda.

== Career statistics ==
As of 31 January 2018

Appearances and goals by club, season and competition
Club	Season	League			Cup		Other		Total	
Club	Season	Division	Apps	Goals	Apps	Goals	Apps	Goals	Apps	Goals
Jong PSV	2013–14	Eerste Divisie	27	3	0	0	0	0	27	3
Jong PSV	2014–15	Eerste Divisie	28	6	0	0	0	0	28	6
Jong PSV	2015–16	Eerste Divisie	32	5	0	0	0	0	32	5
Jong PSV	Total		87	14	0	0	0	0	87	14
PSV	2014–15	Eredivisie	0	0	0	0	0	0	0	0
VVV	2016–17	Eerste Divisie	37	12	2	0	0	0	39	12
VVV	2017–18	Eredivisie	20	7	3	0	0	0	23	7
VVV	Total		57	19	5	0	0	0	62	19
Career total			144	33	5	0	0	0	149	33

== Honours ==
VVV-Venlo

- Eerste Divisie: 2016–17

Individual

- Eredivisie Player of the Month: September 2020
- Eredivisie Team of the Month: October 2024,
