= Jerold Promes =

Dutch footballer (born 1984)

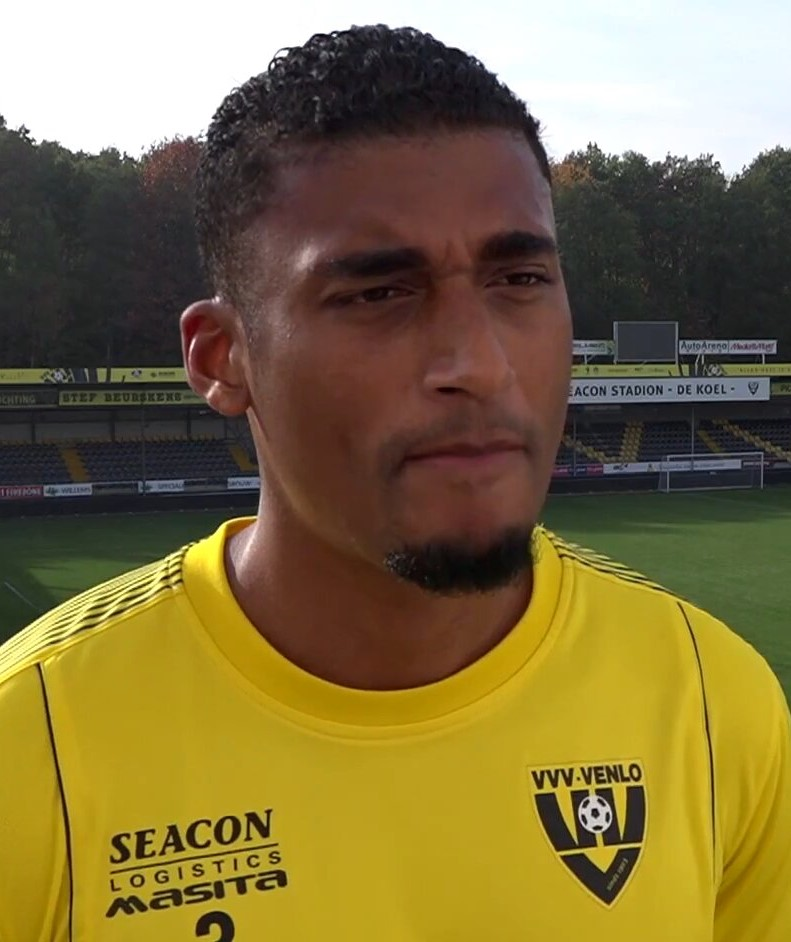
- Promes in 2017

Personal information
- Full name: Jerold Ryan Promes
- Date of birth: 9 March 1984 (age 42)
- Place of birth: Amsterdam, Netherlands
- Height: 1.85 m (6 ft 1 in)
- Position: Centre-back

Youth career
- 1990–1997: Abcoude
- 1997–2003: Ajax

Senior career*
Years	Team	Apps	(Gls)
2004–2006	RKC Waalwijk	7	(0)
2006–2007	AZ	0	(0)
2007–2009	Sparta Rotterdam	39	(1)
2009–2013	Telstar	110	(3)
2013–2019	VVV-Venlo	158	(5)
- * Club domestic league appearances and goals

Jerold Ryan Promes (born 9 March 1984) is a Dutch former professional footballer who played as a centre back.

== Early life and career ==
Jerold Ryan Promes was born on 9 March in 1984 in Amsterdam. He came through the youth ranks of Ajax but did not make the grade at his hometown club and joined RKC Waalwijk in 2004. After a long injury lay-off he was signed by AZ to play in their youth team and then Danny Blind lined him up at Sparta Rotterdam in summer 2007. He left the club in 2009, joining SC Telstar in the Dutch second division, where he became team captain. After playing four seasons for Telstar, he left the club as a free agent.

In July 2013, Promes signed a three-year contract with VVV-Venlo. A shoulder injury would, however, keep him sidelined for large parts of his first season in Venlo. The injury initially occurred in a KNVB Cup match against SC Heerenveen, where his shoulder was dislocated, and the same thing happened two months later in an away match against Helmond Sport. Therefore, surgery turned out to be necessary. In the following two seasons, Promes grew into a regular starter in defense. On 27 May 2016, VVV announced that his expiring contract had been extended for another season. On 22 February 2019, Promes broke his left knee cap during a home game against Heracles Almelo, as a result of which he was not expected to be able to play football until the end of 2019. At the end of March 2019, VVV announced that the contract with the 35-year-old Promes would not be extended. He would, however, start rehabilitating at the club under the supervision of a physiotherapist and after his recovery he would be given the opportunity to earn a new contract.

In October 2020, it was announced that Promes had retired from football.

== Career statistics ==
As of 31 January 2018

Appearances and goals by club, season and competition
Club	Season	League			Cup		Other		Total	
Club	Season	Division	Apps	Goals	Apps	Goals	Apps	Goals	Apps	Goals
RKC Waalwijk	2004–05	Eredivisie	7	0	0	0	0	0	7	0
RKC Waalwijk	2005–06	Eredivisie	0	0	0	0	0	0	0	0
RKC Waalwijk	Total		7	0	0	0	0	0	7	0
Sparta Rotterdam	2007–08	Eredivisie	17	1	0	0	0	0	17	1
Sparta Rotterdam	2008–09	Eredivisie	22	0	0	0	0	0	22	0
Sparta Rotterdam	Total		39	1	0	0	0	0	39	1
Telstar	2009–10	Eerste Divisie	17	1	0	0	0	0	17	1
Telstar	2010–11	Eerste Divisie	31	0	3	0	0	0	34	0
Telstar	2011–12	Eerste Divisie	33	0	1	0	0	0	34	0
Telstar	2012–13	Eerste Divisie	29	2	1	0	0	0	30	2
Telstar	Total		110	3	5	0	0	0	115	3
VVV	2013–14	Eerste Divisie	13	0	2	0	0	0	15	0
VVV	2014–15	Eerste Divisie	31	2	2	0	4 (Note: Appearances in Promotion play-offs)	0	37	2
VVV	2015–16	Eerste Divisie	25	1	1	0	2	0	28	1
VVV	2016–17	Eerste Divisie	37	1	2	0	0	0	39	1
VVV	2017–18	Eredivisie	19	1	1	0	0	0	20	1
VVV	Total		125	5	8	0	6	0	139	5
Career totals			281	9	13	0	6	0	300	9

== Honours ==
VVV-Venlo

- Eerste Divisie: 2016–17
