= Romeo Castelen =

Dutch footballer (born 1983)

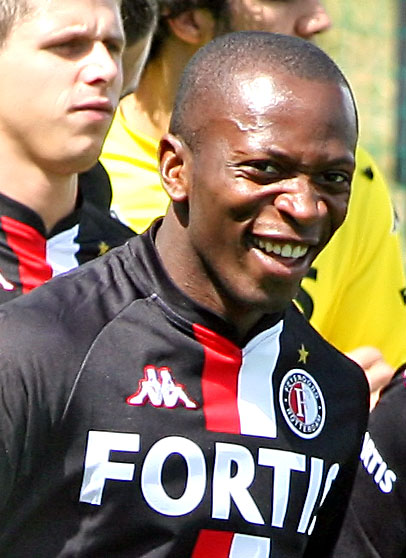
- Castelen in training with Feyenoord in 2007

Personal information
- Full name: Romeo Erwan Marius Castelen
- Date of birth: 3 May 1983 (age 43)
- Place of birth: Paramaribo, Suriname
- Height: 1.70 m (5 ft 7 in)
- Position: Winger

Youth career
- 1993–1997: De Volewijckers
- 1997–1998: Sparta Rotterdam
- 1998–2000: ADO Den Haag

Senior career*
Years	Team	Apps	(Gls)
2000–2004	ADO Den Haag	83	(20)
2004–2007	Feyenoord	65	(20)
2007–2012	Hamburger SV	17	(1)
2009–2011	Hamburger SV II	5	(5)
2013	Volga Nizhny Novgorod	2	(0)
2013–2014	RKC Waalwijk	29	(6)
2014–2016	Western Sydney Wanderers	44	(9)
2016	Suwon Bluewings	5	(0)
2017	Zhejiang Yiteng	23	(3)
2018	VVV-Venlo	14	(0)
Total		287	(64)

International career
2004–2007	Netherlands	10	(1)
Medal record
Men's football
Representing Netherlands
UEFA European Under-21 Championship
Winner	2006 Portugal
- * Club domestic league appearances and goals

Romeo Erwan Marius Castelen (born 3 May 1983) is a Dutch former professional footballer who played as a winger.

== Club career ==
=== ADO Den Haag ===
Born in Paramaribo, Suriname, Castelen started his professional career with ADO Den Haag, playing two full seasons in the second division. He made his first-team debut at not yet 18, and contributed with nine goals in 24 games in 2002–03 as the club returned to the Eredivisie, as champions.

Castelen made his top level debut on 16 August 2003, in a 1–0 away loss against RKC Waalwijk. He only missed six matches during the campaign as The Hague side narrowly avoided relegation (15th position).

=== Feyenoord ===
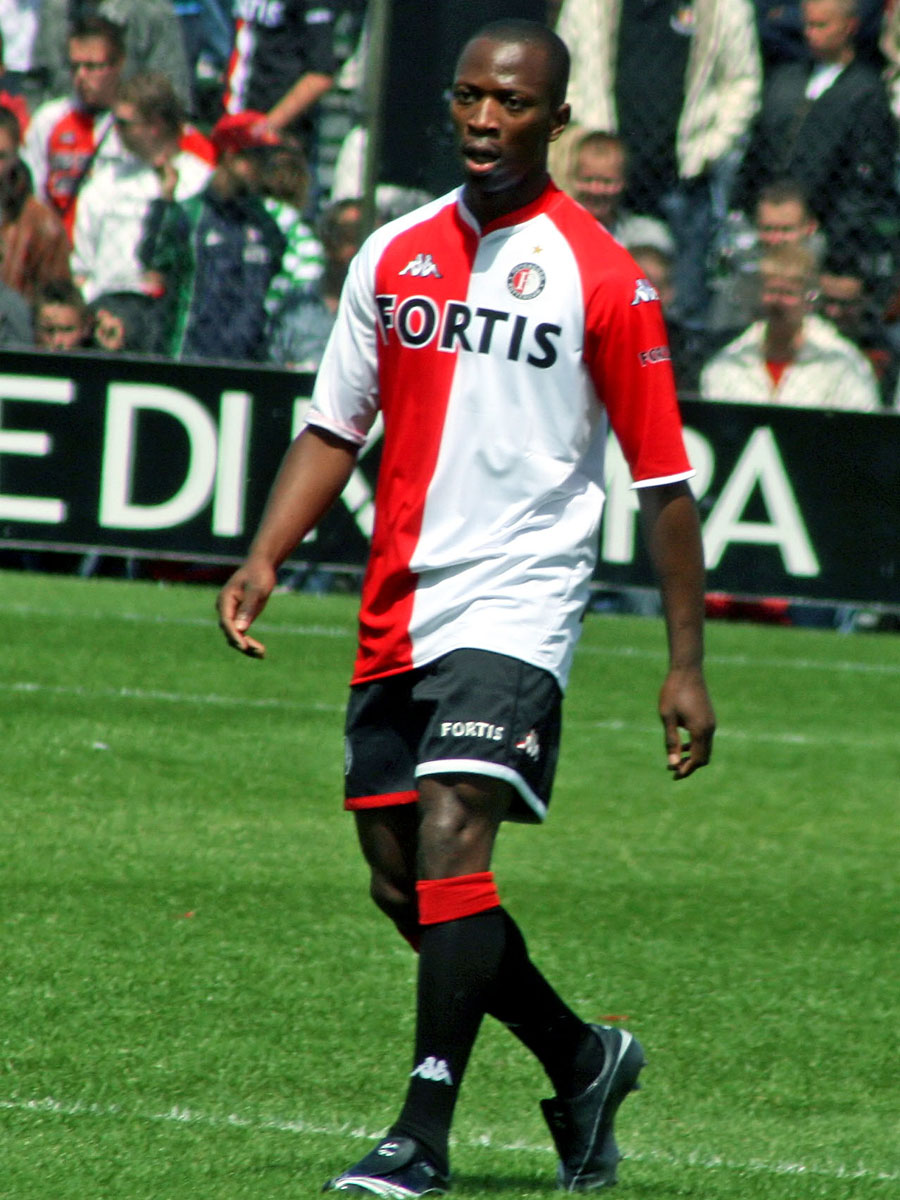
Castelen in 2007.

Castelen moved to Feyenoord for 2004–05, making his official debut for his new team on 15 August and scoring a brace in a 6–1 home win against De Graafschap. He netted 19 goals in his first two years with the Rotterdam side combined, as it finished fourth and third respectively.

Together with Salomon Kalou and Dirk Kuyt, Castelen was part of an efficient Feyenoord attack. He only appeared in 23 contests in his second year however, due to injury.

Castelen could only amass 12 league matches in 2006–07 due to an ankle ailment, as Feyenoord finished in seventh position. On 22 April 2007, he scored his only game of the season, in a 1–1 home draw against NEC Nijmegen.

=== Hamburger SV ===
Castelen was declared fit prior to the start of the 2007–08 campaign, with his contract expiring at the end of that season. He was offered a new deal, but declined to sign it after deeming his future at the club as not very bright due to its recent results. However, when players like Giovanni van Bronckhorst, Kevin Hofland and Roy Makaay were signed, he reconsidered, but eventually agreed on terms with Hamburger SV from Germany in late July 2007, signing a four-year contract; he appeared in 79 official games for Feyenoord, scoring 21 goals.

Castelen made his Bundesliga debut on 11 August 2007, playing seven minutes in a 1–0 away win against Hannover 96. During his spell at the Volksparkstadion, however, he was plagued with constant injury problems, and he was released in June 2012 after his contract was not renewed.

=== Later years ===
After nearly one year out of football, Castelen signed with Russian Premier League team Volga Nizhny Novgorod on 15 February 2013. He was released at the end of the season.

On 3 July 2013, Castelen returned to his homeland and its top division, joining RKC Waalwijk. Roughly one year later, he signed a two-year contract with A-League club Western Sydney Wanderers. He participated with his new team at the 2014 FIFA Club World Cup, scoring the opener against ES Sétif in the fifth-place match, which ended in a penalty shootout loss after a 2–2 draw.

In the 2015–16 campaign, Castelen netted seven goals overall. Three of those came in the final series' semi-finals, a 5–4 extra time win over Brisbane Roar. However, on 5 May 2016, he was released.

On 14 July 2016, Castelen signed with K-League Classic team Suwon Samsung Bluewings. In the 2018 January transfer window, the 34-year old returned to his country and joined VVV-Venlo, making his debut against former club Den Haag. He retired from professional football later that year. Since then, he has worked as an agent, advising players such as Evert Linthorst and Simon Janssen.

== International career ==
Castelen's solid beginnings with Feyenoord impressed newly appointed Dutch national team manager Marco van Basten, and the player made his debut with Oranje on 18 August 2004, starting in a 2–2 friendly draw in Sweden. His physical condition, however, denied him a spot in the squad for the 2006 FIFA World Cup.

Also in 2006, Castelen helped the under-21 team win the UEFA European Championship in Portugal.

== Personal life ==
In 1989, both Castelen's mother and sister died in the Surinam Airways Flight PY764 crash in which 15 Surinamese footballers lost their lives.

== Career statistics ==
=== Club ===
Appearances and goals by club, season and competition
Club	Season	League			National cup (Note: Includes KNVB Cup, DFB Pokal, Russian Cup, Australia Cup, Korean FA Cup, Chinese FA Cup.)		Continental		Other		Total	
Club	Season	Division	Apps	Goals	Apps	Goals	Apps	Goals	Apps	Goals	Apps	Goals
ADO Den Haag	2000–01	Eerste Divisie	3	0	0	0	—		—		3	0
ADO Den Haag	2001–02	Eerste Divisie	28	7	4	1	—		0	0	32	8
ADO Den Haag	2002–03	Eerste Divisie	24	9	3	2	—		—		27	11
ADO Den Haag	2003–04	Eredivisie	28	4	1	0	—		—		29	4
ADO Den Haag	Total		83	20	8	3	—		0	0	91	23
Feyenoord	2004–05	Eredivisie	30	10	3	0	7	0	—		40	10
Feyenoord	2005–06	Eredivisie	23	9	0	0	2	0	1	0	26	9
Feyenoord	2006–07	Eredivisie	12	1	0	0	0	0	2	1	14	2
Feyenoord	Total		65	20	3	0	9	0	3	1	80	21
Hamburger SV	2007–08	Bundesliga	13	0	0	0	4	1	—		17	1
Hamburger SV	2008–09	Bundesliga	0	0	0	0	0	0	—		0	0
Hamburger SV	2009–10	Bundesliga	2	1	0	0	1	0	—		3	1
Hamburger SV	2010–11	Bundesliga	0	0	0	0	0	0	—		0	0
Hamburger SV	2011–12	Bundesliga	2	0	0	0	0	0	—		2	0
Hamburger SV	Total		17	1	0	0	5	1	—		22	2
Hamburger SV II	2009–10	Regionalliga Nord	1	0	—		—		—		1	0
Hamburger SV II	2011–12	Regionalliga Nord	4	5	—		—		—		4	5
Hamburger SV II	Total		5	5	—		—		—		5	5
Volga Nizhny Novgorod	2012–13	Russian Premier League	2	0	0	0	—		—		2	0
RKC Waalwijk	2013–14	Eredivisie	29	6	1	0	0	0	4 (Note: Appeareances in Eredivise relegation play-offs)	0	34	6
Western Sydney Wanderers	2014–15	A-League	16	2	1	0	5	1	2 (Note: Appeareances in FIFA Club World Cup)	1	24	4
Western Sydney Wanderers	2015–16	A-League	28	7	1	0	—		—		29	7
Western Sydney Wanderers	Total		44	9	2	0	5	1	2	1	53	11
Samsung Bluewings	2016	K-League Classic	5	0	0	0	—		—		5	0
Zhejiang Yiteng	2017	China League One	23	3	0	0	—		—		23	3
VVV-Venlo	2017–18	Eredivisie	14	0	0	0	—		—		14	0
Career total			287	64	14	3	19	2	9	2	329	71

=== International ===
Appearances and goals by national team and year
National team	Year	Apps	Goals
Netherlands	2004	4	0
Netherlands	2005	4	1
Netherlands	2007	2	0
Total		10	1

Score and result list the Netherlands' goal tally first, score column indicates score after Castelen goal.

International goal scored by Romeo Castelen
No.	Date	Venue	Opponent	Score	Result	Competition
1	30 March 2005	Philips Stadion, Eindhoven, Netherlands	Armenia	1–0	2–0	2006 World Cup qualification

== Honours ==
Den Haag

- Eerste Divisie: 2002–03

Netherlands U21

- UEFA European Under-21 Championship: 2006
