= 2021–22 VVV-Venlo season =

Dutch football club season

VVV-Venlo
2021–22 season
- Stadium: Seacon Stadion – De Koel
- Eerste Divisie: 10th
- KNVB Cup: 1R
- Top goalscorer: League: Sven Braken (11 goals); All: Sven Braken (11 goals)
- Biggest win: 5-0 MVV Maastricht (a) 6th week
- Biggest defeat: 5-0 ADO Den Haag (h) 20th week 6-1 Jong Ajax (a) 20th week
- All statistics correct as of 27 July 2026.

The 2021–22 season was VVV-Venlo's 38th season in the Eerste Divisie (1st consecutive).

The club also competed in the KNVB Cup, where it was eliminated in the first round after losing 4–2 on penalties to NAC Breda following a 1–1 draw.

Sven Braken was the top scorer of the club in this season with 11 goals in the Eerste Divisie.

Yahcuroo Roemer made a team-high 38 appearances during the campaign, with 37 appearances in the Eerste Divisie and one in the KNVB Cup.

== Players ==
=== First-team squad ===
As of 31 January 2022

Note: Flags indicate national team as defined under FIFA eligibility rules; some limited exceptions apply. Players may hold more than one non-FIFA nationality.

No.	Pos.	Nation	Player
1	GK	CZE	Lukáš Zima
2	DF	GER	Tobias Pachonik
3	DF	CPV	Kristopher da Graça
3	DF	NED	Sem Dirks
4	DF	NED	Tristan Dekker
5	DF	GER	Brian Koglin
6	MF	NED	Danny Post (captain)
7	FW	NED	Guus Hupperts
7	FW	NED	Nick Venema
8	MF	NED	Kees de Boer
9	FW	NED	Sven Braken
10	MF	SWE	Carl Johansson
11	FW	NED	Joeri Schroyen
12	DF	NED	Stan van Dijck
14	FW	NED	Wassim Essanoussi
15	DF	NED	Simon Janssen
16	GK	NED	Delano van Crooij

No.	Pos.	Nation	Player
17	MF	NED	Aaron Bastiaans
17	MF	CZE	Richard Sedláček
18	FW	EST	Erik Sorga
18	MF	NED	Rayan El Azrak
19	FW	NED	Yahcuroo Roemer
20	MF	NED	Mitchell van Rooijen
21	DF	NED	Ian Hussein Ngobi
23	FW	ALB	Ertan Hajdaraj
24	MF	NED	Joep Munsters
26	MF	NED	Levi Smans
27	MF	NED	Niek Munsters
31	FW	NED	Thijme Verheijen
32	DF	SUR	Yannick Leliendal
33	MF	GER	Jonas Theuerzeit
34	MF	NED	Joep Kluskens
34	MF	NED	Levi Titulaer

== Transfers ==
=== In ===
Pos.	Player	Transferred from	Fee	Date
DF	(Germany) Brian Koglin	(Germany) 1. FC Magdeburg	Free	1 July 2021
FW	(Netherlands) Sven Braken	(Italy) US Livorno 1915	Free	1 July 2021
MF	(Netherlands) Kees de Boer	(Netherlands) ADO Den Haag	Free	6 July 2021
GK	(Czech Republic) Lukáš Zima	(Italy) Genoa CFC	Free	13 July 2021
FW	(Netherlands) Joeri Schroyen	(Greece) Xanthi F.C.	Free	22 July 2021
MF	(Netherlands) Mitchell van Rooijen	(Netherlands) FC Utrecht		26 July 2021
FW	(Sweden) Carl Johansson	(Sweden) Östers IF		6 August 2021
FW	(Estonia) Erik Sorga	(United States) D.C. United	On loan	12 August 2021
FW	(Netherlands) Nick Venema	(Netherlands) Jong FC Utrecht	On loan	1 January 2022
MF	(Netherlands) Rayan El Azrak	(Netherlands) Jong FC Utrecht	On loan	26 January 2022
MF	(Czech Republic) Richard Sedláček	(Netherlands) Jong AZ		31 January 2022
DF	(Netherlands) Sem Dirks	(Netherlands) Jong AZ	On loan	31 January 2022

=== Out ===
Pos.	Player	Transferred to	Fee	Date
FW	(Greece) Anastasios Donis	(France) Stade de Reims	End of loan	30 June 2021
MF	(Greece) Christos Donis	(Italy) Ascoli Calcio 1898 FC	End of loan	30 June 2021
MF	(France) Zinédine Machach	(Italy) SSC Napoli	End of loan	30 June 2021
DF	(Netherlands) Christian Kum	End of career		1 July 2021
FW	(Aruba) Joshua John	No club		1 July 2021
DF	(Germany) Lukas Schmitz	End of career		1 July 2021
GK	(Germany) Thorsten Kirschbaum	(Germany) SSV Jahn Regensburg	Free	1 July 2021
FW	(Netherlands) Torino Hunte	No club		1 July 2021
FW	(Netherlands) Vito van Crooij	(Netherlands) Sparta Rotterdam		1 July 2021
DF	(Switzerland) Roy Gelmi	(Switzerland) FC Winterthur	Free	24 July 2021
DF	(Germany) Steffen Schäfer	(Germany) SC Verl	Free	26 August 2021
FW	(Curaçao) Jafar Arias	(Romania) FC Argeș Pitești	Free	29 August 2021
DF	(Netherlands) Arjan Swinkels	(Belgium) FC Esperanza Pelt	Free	31 August 2021
FW	(Greece) Georgios Giakoumakis	(Scotland) Celtic F.C.	€2,450,000	31 August 2021
FW	(Netherlands) Guus Hupperts	No club		24 December 2021
FW	(Estonia) Erik Sorga	(United States) D.C. United	End of loan	7 January 2022
FW	(Netherlands) Aaron Bastiaans	(Netherlands) Helmond Sport	On loan	28 January 2022
MF	(Netherlands) Danny Post	(Netherlands) Almere City FC		29 January 2022
DF	(Cape Verde) Kristopher da Graça	(Sweden) IK Sirius Fotboll		29 January 2022

== Competitions ==
=== Overview ===
Competition	First match	Last match	Starting round	Final position	Record							
Competition	First match	Last match	Starting round	Final position	Pld	W	D	L	GF	GA	GD	Win %
Eerste Divisie	8 August 2021	6 May 2022	Week 1	10th	38	14	6	18	50	64	−14	36.84
KNVB Cup	26 October 2021	26 October 2021	1st round	1st round	1	0	1	0	1	1	+0	0.00
Total					39	14	7	18	51	65	−14	35.90

Last updated: 31 August 2026
Source: ESPN

=== Eerste Divisie ===
==== League table ====
Pos	Team	Pld	W	D	L	GF	GA	GD	Pts	Promotion or qualification
8	NAC Breda	38	16	11	11	60	45	+15	59	Qualification to promotion play-offs
9	De Graafschap	38	15	11	12	52	43	+9	56	Qualification to promotion play-offs
10	VVV-Venlo	38	14	6	18	50	64	−14	48	
11	FC Den Bosch	38	14	5	19	42	61	−19	47	
12	Jong PSV	38	11	11	16	61	63	−2	44	Reserve teams are not eligible to be promoted to the Eredivisie

Updated to match(es) played on 6 May 2022. Source: Soccerway, Keuken Kampioen Divisie (in Dutch)
Rules for classification: Season in progress: 1) Most points won; 2) Less points lost; 3) Goal difference; 4) Goals scored; 5) Alphabetical order; End of season: 1) Points; 2) Goal difference; 3) Goals scored; 4) Head-to-head points; 5) Head-to-head goal difference; 6) Head-to-head away goals scored; 7) Play-off if relevant for deciding champion, relegation or participating in a European league, otherwise by draw. 8) Penalty shoot-out (only after a play-off)

==== Results summary ====
Overall								Home						Away					
Pld	W	D	L	GF	GA	GD	Pts	W	D	L	GF	GA	GD	W	D	L	GF	GA	GD
38	14	6	18	50	64	−14	48	7	4	8	27	33	−6	7	2	10	23	31	−8

Last updated: 6 May 2022.
Source: Eerste Divisie

==== Results by round ====
Round	1	2	3	4	5	6	7	8	9	10	11	12	13	14	15	16	17	18	19	20	21	22	23	24	25	26	27	28	29	30	31	32	33	34	35	36	37	38
Ground	H	A	H	H	A	H	A	H	A	H	A	H	A	H	A	H	A	A	H	H	A	H	A	H	A	H	A	H	A	A	H	A	H	A	H	A	H	A
Result	D	L	W	L	W	W	L	W	L	W	L	L	L	L	L	W	D	W	L	L	W	L	L	W	W	D	W	D	L	W	L	D	L	L	W	L	D	W
Position																																						10

Updated to match(es) played on 6 May 2022. Source: Eredivisie
A = Away; H = Home; W = Win; D = Draw; L = Loss

=== Matches ===
==== 1st half ====
8 August 2021 1st week	VVV-Venlo	2-2	NAC Breda	Venlo
14:30	Brian Koglin 21'; Colin Rösler 58' (o.g.)	Report	Ralf Seuntjens 10'; Boris van Schuppen 90+1'	Stadium: Covebo Stadion – De Koel – Attendance: 4,632

13 August 2021 2nd week	TOP Oss	2-1	VVV-Venlo	Oss
20:00	Justin Mathieu 61'; Stephen Buyl 90+2'	Report	Jan Lammers 89' (o.g.)	Stadium: Frans Heesen Stadion; Attendance: 1,576

21 August 2021 3rd week	VVV-Venlo	2-1	Almere City FC	Venlo
16:30	Erik Sorga 45+3' 53'	Report	Lance Duijvestijn 3'	Stadium: Covebo Stadion – De Koel – Attendance: 3,832

27 August 2021 4th week	VVV-Venlo	0-1	Jong AZ	Venlo
20:00		Report	Fedde de Jong 72'	Stadium: Covebo Stadion – De Koel – Attendance: 3,788

5 September 2021 5th week	FC Dordrecht	0-1	VVV-Venlo	Dordrecht
20:00		Report	Levi Smans 43'	Stadium: M-Scores Stadion; Attendance: 1,258

10 September 2021 6th week	VVV Venlo	2-1	FC Den Bosch	Venlo
20:00	Yahcuroo Roemer 87'; Brian Koglin 90'	Report	Roy Kuijpers 67'	Stadium: Covebo Stadion – De Koel – Attendance: 4,668

17 September 2021 7th week	FC Volendam	2-1	VVV-Venlo	Volendam
20:00	Robert Mühren 14'; Boy Deul 48'	Report	Tristan Dekker 22'	Stadium: Kras Stadion; Attendance: 3,687

24 September 2021 8th week	VVV-Venlo	1-0	Helmond Sport	Venlo
20:00	Wassim Essanoussi 90'	Report		Stadium: Covebo Stadion – De Koel – Attendance: 5,212

1 October 2021 9th week	Jong PSV	2-1	VVV-Venlo	Eindhoven
20:00	Johan Bakayoko 24'; Maximiliano Romero 44' (pen.)	Report	Erik Sorga 46'	Stadium: De Herdgang; Attendance: 911

9 October 2021 10th week	VVV-Venlo	2-0	MVV Maastricht	Venlo
16:30	Tristan Dekker 40'; Carl Johansson 88'	Report		Stadium: Covebo Stadion – De Koel – Attendance: 6,024

15 October 2021 11th week	Excelsior Rotterdam	3-0	VVV-Venlo	Rotterdam
20:00	Reuven Niemeijer 45' 53'; Thijs Dallinga 56'	Report		Stadium: Stadion Woudestein; Attendance: 2,734

22 October 2021 12th week	VVV-Venlo	1-2	De Graafschap	Venlo
20:00	Sven Braken 57'	Report	Giovanni Korte 52'; Jasper van Heertum 62'	Stadium: Covebo Stadion – De Koel – Attendance: 5,657

29 October 2021 13th week	FC Emmen	1-0	VVV-Venlo	Emmen
20:00	Jeredy Hilterman 62'	Report		Stadium: De Oude Meerdijk; Attendance: 7,402

5 November 2021 14th week	VVV-Venlo	1-3	Jong Ajax	Venlo
20:00	Mitchell van Rooijen 53'	Report	Kenneth Taylor 4'; Naci Ünüvar 62'; Danilo 72' (pen.)	Stadium: Covebo Stadion – De Koel – Attendance: 4,777

14 November 2021 15th week	ADO Den Haag	2-0	VVV-Venlo	Den Haag
16:45	Sem Steijn 4'; Thomas Verheydt 66' (pen.)	Report		Stadium: ADO Den Haag Stadium; Attendance: 0

19 November 2021 16th week	VVV-Venlo	2-0	FC Eindhoven	Venlo
20:00	Sven Braken 42'; Mitchell van Rooijen 61'	Report		Stadium: Covebo Stadion – De Koel – Attendance: 0

26 November 2021 17th week	Roda JC Kerkrade	0-0	VVV-Venlo	Kerkrade
20:00		Report		Stadium: Parkstad Limburg Stadion; Attendance: 0

3 December 2021 18th week	SC Telstar	1-3	VVV-Venlo	Velsen-Zuid
20:00	Ozgur Aktas 57'	Report	Mitchell van Rooijen 15'; Brian Koglin 75'; Yahcuroo Roemer 90+2'	Stadium: BUKO Stadion; Attendance: 0

10 December 2021 19th week	VVV-Venlo	1-2	Jong FC Utrecht	Venlo
20:00	Sven Braken 24' (pen.)	Report	Nick Venema 76' 87'	Stadium: Covebo Stadion – De Koel – Attendance: 0

17 December 2021 20th week	VVV-Venlo	2-3	TOP Oss	Venlo
20:00	Mitchell van Rooijen 8'; Sven Braken 80'	Report	Ilounga Pata 41'; Rick Stuy van den Herik 45+1'; Kay Tejan 62'	Stadium: Covebo Stadion – De Koel – Attendance: 0

==== 2nd half ====
9 January 2022 21st week	De Graafschap	1-2	VVV-Venlo	Doetinchem
16:45	Ted van de Pavert 58'	Report	Aaron Bastiaans 41'; Nick Venema 73'	Stadium: De Vijverberg; Attendance: 0

14 January 2022 22nd week	VVV-Venlo	1-4	Jong PSV	Venlo
20:00	Brian Koglin 24'	Report	Johan Bakayoko 35' 52' (pen.) 68' 84'	Stadium: Covebo Stadion – De Koel – Attendance: 0

21 January 2022 23rd week	Jong AZ	2-0	VVV-Venlo	The Hague
20:00	Myron van Brederode 15'; Fedde de Jong 54'	Report		Stadium: AFAS Trainingscomplex; Attendance: 0

30 January 2022 24th week	VVV-Venlo	4-2	FC Dordrecht	Venlo
12:15	Nick Venema 29'; Rayan El Azrak 58'; Joeri Schroyen 87'; Sven Braken 90+1'	Report	Nikolas Agrafiotis 68'; Seydine N'Diaye 79'	Stadium: Covebo Stadion – De Koel – Attendance: 2,200

4 February 2022 25th week	MVV Maastricht	0-5	VVV-Venlo	Maastricht
20:00		Report	Rayan El Azrak 3' 14' 40'; Nick Venema 43'; Sven Braken 72'	Stadium: De Geusselt; Attendance: 3,200

13 February 2022 26th week	VVV-Venlo	1-1	Roda JC Kerkrade	Venlo
14:30	Nick Venema 30'	Report	Dylan Vente 27'	Stadium: Covebo Stadion – De Koel – Attendance: 2,730

25 February 2022 27th week	Almere City FC	0-1	VVV-Venlo	Almere
20:00		Report	Danny Post 23' (o.g.)	Stadium: Yanmar Stadion; Attendance: 2,467

4 March 2022 28th week	VVV-Venlo	0-0	FC Volendam	Venlo
20:00		Report		Stadium: Covebo Stadion – De Koel – Attendance: 5,100

11 March 2022 29th week	FC Eindhoven	4-0	VVV-Venlo	Eindhoven
20:00	Charles-Andreas Brym 20'; Jasper Dahlhaus 23' 57'; Jort van der Sande 88'	Report		Stadium: Jan Louwers Stadion; Attendance: 2,731

14 March 2022 30th week	Helmond Sport	0-3	VVV-Venlo	Helmond
20:00		Report	Carl Johansson 45'; Nick Venema 63' 81'	Stadium: Stadion De Braak; Attendance: 1,906

19 March 2022 31st week	VVV-Venlo	0-2	FC Emmen	Venlo
16:30		Report	Rui Mendes 67'; Azzeddine Toufiqui 90+2'	Stadium: Covebo Stadion – De Koel – Attendance: 7,856

26 March 2022 32nd week	FC Den Bosch	0-0	VVV-Venlo	Den Bosch
16:30		Report		Stadium: De Vliert; Attendance: 3,782; Referee: Robin Vereijken

1 April 2022 33rd week	VVV-Venlo	0-5	ADO Den Haag	Venlo
20:00		Report	Thomas Verheydt 5' 54' 76'; Sem Steijn 47'; Ricardo Kishna 61'	Stadium: Covebo Stadion – De Koel – Attendance: 5,259; Referee: Rob Dieperink

8 April 2022 34th week	NAC Breda	3-1	VVV-Venlo	Breda
20:00	Danny Bakker 16'; Naoufal Bannis 23' 79'	Report	Mitchell van Rooijen 81'	Stadium: Rat Verlegh Stadion; Attendance: 16,632; Referee: Joey Kooij

15 April 2022 35th week	VVV-Venlo	3-2	SC Telstar	Venlo
20:00	Sven Braken 25' 55' 60'	Report	Ozgur Aktas 75'; Glynor Plet 80'	Stadium: Covebo Stadion – De Koel – Attendance: 5,562; Referee: Michael Eijgelsheim

25 April 2022 36th week	Jong Ajax	6-1	VVV-Venlo	Duivendrecht, Amsterdam
20:00	Mohammed Kudus 22'; Naci Ünüvar 52' 80' (pen.); Mohamed Ihattaren 58' 62' 68'	Report	Joeri Schroyen 23'	Stadium: Sportpark De Toekomst; Attendance: 1,247; Referee: Nick Smit

29 April 2022 37th week	VVV-Venlo	2-2	Excelsior Rotterdam	Venlo
20:00	Joeri Schroyen 49'; Sven Braken 72'	Report	Couhaib Driouech 83'; Marouan Azarkan 90+1'	Stadium: Covebo Stadion – De Koel – Attendance: 6,223; Referee: Martijn Vos

6 May 2022 38th week	Jong FC Utrecht	2-3	VVV-Venlo	Utrecht
20:00	Mees Rijks 23'; Mohamed Mallahi 51'	Report	Nick Venema 19'; Mitchell van Rooijen 33'; Sven Braken 62'	Stadium: Sportcomplex Zoudenbalch; Attendance: 402; Referee: Laurens Gerrets

=== KNVB Cup ===
26 October 2021 1st round	NAC Breda	1-1 (a.e.t.) (4–2 p)	VVV Venlo	Breda
21:00	Thom Haye 89'	Report	Yannick Leliendal 33'	Stadium: Rat Verlegh Stadion; Attendance: 11,635
	Penalties
	Moïse Adiléhou (penalty scored); Danny Bakker (penalty scored); Boris van Schuppen (penalty scored); Thom Haye (penalty scored)		(penalty scored) Sven Braken; (penalty missed) Brian Koglin; (penalty scored) Stan van Dijck; (penalty missed) Kees de Boer

== Statistics ==
=== Scorers ===
#	Player	Eerste Divisie	KNVB	Total
1	(Netherlands) Sven Braken	11	0	11
2	(Netherlands) Nick Venema	7	0	7
3	(Netherlands) Mitchell van Rooijen	6	0	6
4	(Germany) Brian Koglin	4	0	4
4	(Netherlands) Rayan El Azrak	4	0	4
6	(Estonia) Erik Sorga	3	0	3
6	(Netherlands) Joeri Schroyen	3	0	3
8	(Netherlands) Carl Johansson	2	0	2
8	(Netherlands) Tristan Dekker	2	0	2
8	(Netherlands) Yahcuroo Roemer	2	0	2
11	(Netherlands) Aaron Bastiaans	1	0	1
11	(Netherlands) Levi Smans	1	0	1
11	(Netherlands) Wassim Essanoussi	1	0	1
11	(Suriname) Yannick Leliendal	0	1	1

=== Appearances ===
#	Player	Eredivisie	KNVB	Total
1	(Suriname) Yahcuroo Roemer	37	1	38
2	(Netherlands) Simon Janssen	36	1	37
3	(Germany) Brian Koglin	35	1	36
4	(Netherlands) Joeri Schroyen	34	1	35
4	(Germany) Tobias Pachonik	34	1	35
6	(Netherlands) Kees de Boer	32	1	33
7	(Sweden) Carl Johansson	30	0	30
8	(Netherlands) Sven Braken	27	1	28
9	(Netherlands) Mitchell van Rooijen	25	1	26
9	(Netherlands) Stan van Dijck	25	1	26
11	(Netherlands) Delano van Crooij	22	1	23
12	(Netherlands) Levi Smans	20	1	21
13	(Netherlands) Wassim Essanoussi	20	0	20
14	(Netherlands) Tristan Dekker	17	1	18
15	(Czech Republic) Lukáš Zima	17	0	17
16	(Netherlands) Nick Venema	16	0	16
16	(Netherlands) Aaron Bastiaans	15	1	16
16	(Cape Verde) Kristopher da Graça	15	1	16
19	(Netherlands) Joep Munsters	14	1	15
20	(Netherlands) Rayan El Azrak	14	0	14
21	(Netherlands) Danny Post	13	0	13
22	(Estonia) Erik Sorga	11	0	11
23	(Netherlands) Sem Dirks	10	0	10
24	(Germany) Ertan Hajdaraj	7	1	8
24	(Suriname) Yannick Leliendal	7	1	8
26	(Netherlands) Ian Hussein Ngobi	7	0	7
27	(Netherlands) Thijme Verheijen	6	0	6
28	(Netherlands) Guus Hupperts	4	0	4
28	(Germany) Jonas Theuerzeit	4	0	4
28	(Czech Republic) Richard Sedláček	4	0	4
31	(Netherlands) Joep Kluskens	3	0	3
31	(Netherlands) Levi Titulaer	3	0	3
33	(Netherlands) Niek Munsters	2	0	2

=== Clean sheets ===
#	Player	Eerste Divisie
1	(Netherlands) Delano van Crooij	6
2	(Czech Republic) Lukáš Zima	3
Total		9

=== Disciplinary record ===
#	Player	Eerste Divisie		KNVB		Total	
#	Player	Booked	Sent off (straight red)	Booked	Sent off (straight red)	Booked	Sent off (straight red)
1	(Netherlands) Kees de Boer	3	1	0	0	3	1
2	(Germany) Brian Koglin	9	0	0	0	9	0
3	(Netherlands) Stan van Dijck	5	0	0	0	5	0
4	(Netherlands) Simon Janssen	4	0	0	0	4	0
4	(Germany) Tobias Pachonik	4	0	0	0	4	0
6	(Netherlands) Aaron Bastiaans	2	0	1	0	3	0
6	(Netherlands) Danny Post	3	0	0	0	3	0
6	(Netherlands) Ian Hussein Ngobi	3	0	0	0	3	0
6	(Cape Verde) Kristopher da Graça	2	0	1	0	3	0
6	(Netherlands) Rayan El Azrak	3	0	0	0	3	0
6	(Netherlands) Sem Dirks	3	0	0	0	3	0
12	(Sweden) Carl Johansson	2	0	0	0	2	0
12	(Netherlands) Joeri Schroyen	1	1	0	0	2	0
12	(Netherlands) Levi Smans	2	0	0	0	2	0
12	(Netherlands) Mitchell van Rooijen	2	0	0	0	2	0
12	(Netherlands) Nick Venema	2	0	0	0	2	0
12	(Netherlands) Sven Braken	2	0	0	0	2	0
18	(Estonia) Erik Sorga	1	0	0	0	1	0
18	(Netherlands) Guus Hupperts	1	0	0	0	1	0
18	(Netherlands) Joep Kluskens	1	0	0	0	1	0
18	(Netherlands) Joep Munsters	1	0	0	0	1	0
18	(Germany) Jonas Theuerzeit	1	0	0	0	1	0
18	(Netherlands) Yahcuroo Roemer	1	0	0	0	1	0
