= List of Dutch football transfers winter 2020–21 =

This is a list of Dutch football transfers for the 2020–21 winter transfer window. Only transfers featuring Eredivisie are listed.

== Eredivisie ==
Note: Flags indicate national team as has been defined under FIFA eligibility rules. Players may hold more than one non-FIFA nationality.

=== ADO Den Haag ===
In:

No.	Pos.	Nation	Player
5	DF	NED	Juan Familia-Castillo (on loan from (England) Chelsea, previously on loan at AZ)
10	MF	NED	Nasser El Khayati (free agent)
24	FW	NED	Bobby Adekanye (on loan from (Italy) Lazio, previously on loan at (Spain) Cádiz)
30	FW	MAR	Youness Mokhtar (from (United States) Columbus Crew)
53	DF	NED	Daryl Janmaat (free agent)
88	MF	NED	Marko Vejinović (free agent)
90	GK	AUT	Martin Fraisl (from (Germany) SV Sandhausen)
95	MF	CRO	Tomislav Gomelt (from (Italy) Crotone)

Out:

No.	Pos.	Nation	Player
5	MF	JAM	Ravel Morrison (free agent)
6	MF	BEL	Dante Rigo (loan return to PSV)
7	DF	ROU	Andrei Rațiu (loan return to (Spain) Villarreal)
11	MF	BEL	Samy Bourard (to (Hungary) Fehérvár)
17	FW	GRE	Nikos Karelis (to (Greece) Panetolikos)
24	FW	NED	Evan Rottier (on loan to TOP Oss)

=== Ajax ===
In:

No.	Pos.	Nation	Player
9	FW	MAR	Oussama Idrissi (on loan from (Spain) Sevilla)
22	FW	CIV	Sébastien Haller (from (England) West Ham United)

Out:

No.	Pos.	Nation	Player
9	FW	NED	Klaas-Jan Huntelaar (to (Germany) Schalke 04)
11	FW	NED	Quincy Promes (to (Russia) Spartak Moscow)

=== AZ ===
In:

No.	Pos.	Nation	Player

Out:

No.	Pos.	Nation	Player
4	DF	NED	Ron Vlaar (retired)
14	FW	NED	Ferdy Druijf (on loan to (Belgium) Mechelen)
19	DF	NED	Juan Familia-Castillo (loan return to (England) Chelsea)
25	MF	NED	Thijs Oosting (on loan to RKC Waalwijk)

=== Emmen ===
In:

No.	Pos.	Nation	Player
15	MF	PER	Didier La Torre (from (Peru) Alianza Lima)
17	FW	NED	Paul Gladon (from Willem II)
20	MF	NED	Jari Vlak (from Volendam)
28	GK	NED	Michael Verrips (on loan from (England) Sheffield United)
31	MF	TUR	Kerim Frei (from (Turkey) İstanbul Başakşehir)
35	DF	PER	Jean-Pierre Rhyner (on loan from (Spain) Cádiz, previously on loan at (Spain) Cartagena)
77	MF	SRB	Luka Adžić (on loan from (Belgium) Anderlecht, previously on loan at (Turkey) Ankaragücü)

Out:

No.	Pos.	Nation	Player
2	DF	NED	Collin Seedorf (to Eindhoven)
6	MF	NED	Anco Jansen (to NAC)
13	MF	KOS	Behadil Šabani (to (Germany) Rot-Weiß Koblenz)
17	FW	KOS	Donis Avdijaj (to (Cyprus) AEL Limassol)
20	MF	NED	Michael Chacón (to (Colombia) Atlético Nacional)

=== Feyenoord ===
In:

No.	Pos.	Nation	Player
24	FW	ARG	Lucas Pratto (on loan from (Argentina) River Plate)

Out:

No.	Pos.	Nation	Player
3	DF	NED	Sven van Beek (on loan to Willem II)
7	FW	NED	Luciano Narsingh (on loan to Twente)
14	DF	SCO	George Johnston (on loan to (England) Wigan Athletic)
55	DF	NED	Ian Smeulers (on loan to Willem II)
59	MF	NED	Jordy Wehrmann (on loan to (Switzerland) Luzern)

=== Fortuna Sittard ===
In:

No.	Pos.	Nation	Player
4	DF	BEL	Dario Van den Buijs (on loan from (Belgium) Beerschot)
17	FW	GRE	Dimitrios Emmanouilidis (on loan from (Greece) Panathinaikos)
25	DF	BEL	Mickaël Tirpan (on loan from (Turkey) Kasımpaşa)
33	FW	NED	Leroy George (free agent)
55	MF	BEL	Thibaud Verlinden (from (England) Stoke City)

Out:

No.	Pos.	Nation	Player
4	DF	SVK	Branislav Niňaj (to (Romania) Sepsi OSK)
6	MF	NED	Jorrit Smeets (to Almere City)
17	FW	FRA	Djibril Dianessy (on loan to MVV)
22	MF	BEL	Adnan Ugur (on loan to Dordrecht)
33	DF	POL	Jarosław Jach (loan return to (England) Crystal Palace)

=== Groningen ===
In:

No.	Pos.	Nation	Player
19	FW	SWE	Paulos Abraham (on loan from (Sweden) AIK)
23	GK	NOR	Per Kristian Bråtveit (on loan from (Sweden) Djurgården)
32	DF	NED	Mike te Wierik (from (England) Derby County)

Out:

No.	Pos.	Nation	Player
22	DF	TUR	Görkem Can (to (Turkey) Denizlispor)
24	GK	NED	Nigel Bertrams (to PEC Zwolle)
35	FW	NED	Remco Balk (to Utrecht)

=== Heerenveen ===
In:

No.	Pos.	Nation	Player
6	MF	NED	Siem de Jong (from (United States) Cincinnati)
22	GK	ISR	Ariel Harush (from (Slovakia) Nitra)
41	DF	SWE	Rami Kaib (from (Sweden) Elfsborg)
42	DF	NED	Syb van Ottele (from NEC)
43	MF	DEN	Lasse Schöne (free agent)
44	MF	CRO	Tibor Halilović (from (Croatia) Rijeka)

Out:

No.	Pos.	Nation	Player
4	DF	URU	Joaquín Fernández (on loan to (Uruguay) Montevideo City)
24	GK	NED	Warner Hahn (to (Belgium) Anderlecht)
—	DF	DEN	Andreas Skovgaard (free agent, previously on loan at (Sweden) Örebro)

=== Heracles ===
In:

No.	Pos.	Nation	Player
25	FW	TUR	Ahmed Kutucu (on loan from (Germany) Schalke 04)
27	MF	TUR	Melih İbrahimoğlu (from (Austria) Rapid Wien)
28	MF	BEL	Elias Sierra (from (Belgium) Genk)

Out:

No.	Pos.	Nation	Player
7	FW	CUW	Jeremy Cijntje (on loan from (Belgium) Waasland-Beveren)
11	FW	NED	Silvester van der Water (to (United States) Orlando City)

=== PSV ===
In:

No.	Pos.	Nation	Player

Out:

No.	Pos.	Nation	Player
8	MF	NED	Jorrit Hendrix (to (Russia) Spartak Moscow)
—	DF	NED	Derrick Luckassen (on loan to (Turkey) Kasımpaşa, previously on loan at (Belgium) Anderlecht)

=== RKC Waalwijk ===
In:

No.	Pos.	Nation	Player
25	MF	NED	Thijs Oosting (on loan from AZ)
29	DF	BEL	Shawn Adewoye (from (Belgium) Genk)
33	MF	NED	Yassin Oukili (from Vitesse)

Out:

No.	Pos.	Nation	Player
6	MF	ISR	Nico Olsak (to (Israel) Beitar Jerusalem)
33	DF	NED	Teun van Grunsven (to Den Bosch)

=== Sparta Rotterdam ===
In:

No.	Pos.	Nation	Player

Out:

No.	Pos.	Nation	Player
12	DF	CPV	Lorenzo Fonseca (to Den Bosch)

=== Twente ===
In:

No.	Pos.	Nation	Player
10	FW	GHA	Abass Issah (on loan from (Germany) Mainz 05)
25	FW	NED	Luciano Narsingh (on loan from Feyenoord)

Out:

No.	Pos.	Nation	Player
10	MF	GRE	Lazaros Lamprou (loan return to (Greece) PAOK)
14	FW	SWE	Alexander Jeremejeff (loan return to (Germany) Dynamo Dresden)
18	MF	ALB	Lindon Selahi (on loan to Willem II)
21	FW	TUR	Halil Dervişoğlu (loan return to (England) Brentford)

=== Utrecht ===
In:

No.	Pos.	Nation	Player
5	DF	NED	Hidde ter Avest (from (Italy) Udinese)
17	DF	MAR	Benaissa Benamar (from Telstar)
30	FW	NED	Remco Balk (from Groningen)

Out:

No.	Pos.	Nation	Player
5	DF	GER	Leon Guwara (on loan to VVV-Venlo)
15	FW	AUS	Daniel Arzani (loan return to (England) Manchester City)
18	MF	NED	Justin Lonwijk (on loan to (Denmark) Viborg)

=== Vitesse ===
In:

No.	Pos.	Nation	Player
16	DF	CRO	Alois Oroz (from (Austria) Liefering)
19	FW	NED	Noah Ohio (on loan from (Germany) RB Leipzig)

Out:

No.	Pos.	Nation	Player
5	DF	ENG	Max Clark (to (England) Hull City)
15	FW	NOR	Filip Delaveris (to (Norway) Brann)
16	FW	NED	Roy Beerens (retired)
29	FW	NED	Thomas Buitink (on loan to PEC Zwolle)
37	MF	NED	Yassin Oukili (to RKC Waalwijk)

=== VVV-Venlo ===
In:

No.	Pos.	Nation	Player
18	MF	GRE	Christos Donis (on loan from (Italy) Ascoli)
21	FW	GRE	Anastasios Donis (on loan from (France) Reims)
37	MF	GER	Meritan Shabani (on loan from (England) Wolverhampton Wanderers)
38	DF	GER	Leon Guwara (on loan from Utrecht)
44	DF	SWE	Kristopher Da Graca (from (Sweden) Göteborg)

Out:

No.	Pos.	Nation	Player
9	MF	CRO	Ante Ćorić (loan return to (Italy) Roma)
18	DF	NED	Stan van Dijck (on loan to Roda JC)
20	MF	NED	Aaron Bastiaans (on loan to Helmond Sport)
21	MF	NED	Evert Linthorst (to (United Arab Emirates) Al Ittihad Kalba)

=== Willem II ===
In:

No.	Pos.	Nation	Player
5	DF	NED	Ian Smeulers (on loan from Feyenoord)
30	MF	ALB	Lindon Selahi (on loan from Twente)
32	DF	NED	Sven van Beek (on loan from Feyenoord)
49	GK	KOS	Arijanet Muric (on loan from (England) Manchester City, previously on loan at (Spain) Girona)

Out:

No.	Pos.	Nation	Player
9	FW	NED	Paul Gladon (to Emmen)
12	DF	AUS	Dylan Ryan (on loan to (Australia) Melbourne Victory)
19	MF	GER	John Yeboah (on loan to Almere City)
—	GK	NZL	Michael Woud (to Almere City, previously on loan)

=== Zwolle ===
In:

No.	Pos.	Nation	Player
7	FW	NED	Virgil Misidjan (from (Germany) 1. FC Nürnberg)
16	GK	NED	Nigel Bertrams (from Groningen)
14	FW	BEL	Manuel Benson (on loan from (Belgium) Antwerp)
29	FW	NED	Thomas Buitink (on loan from Vitesse)

Out:

No.	Pos.	Nation	Player
10	MF	NED	Clint Leemans (on loan to De Graafschap)
16	GK	GER	Michael Zetterer (loan return to (Germany) Werder Bremen)
