= Levi Smans =

Dutch footballer (born 2003)

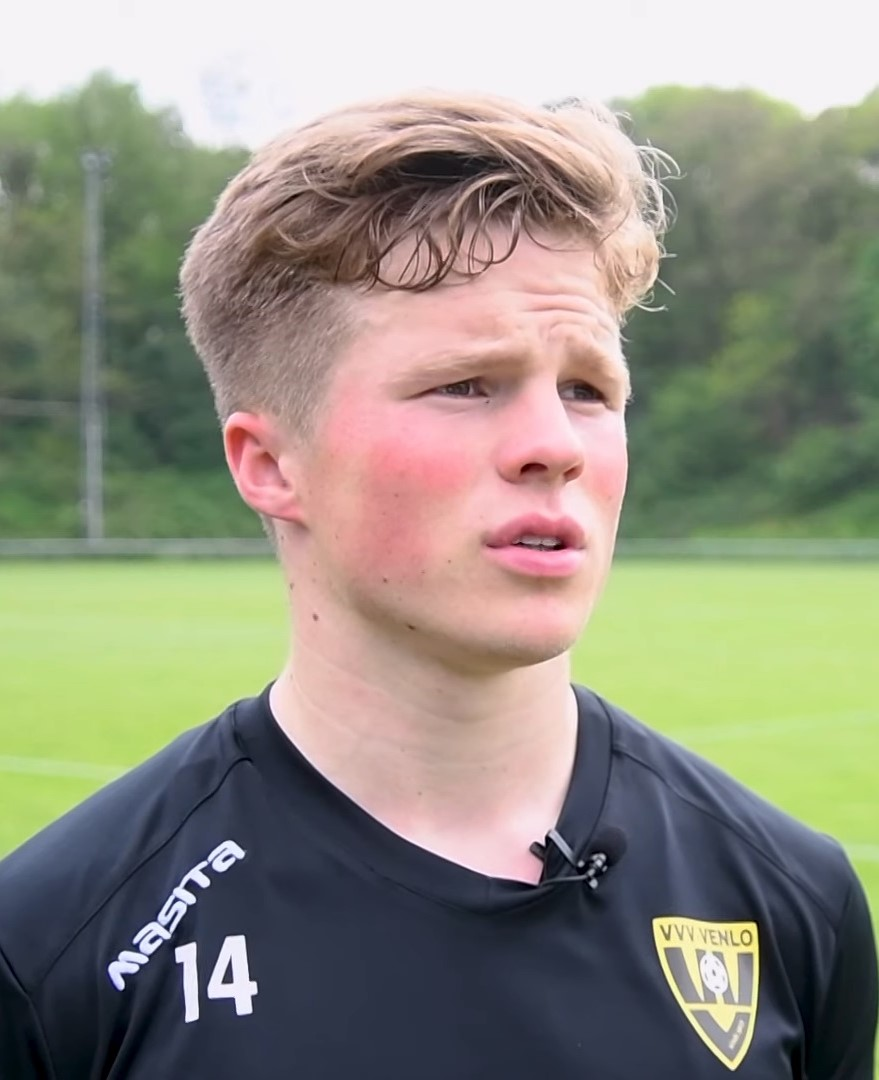
- Smans in 2023

Personal information
- Date of birth: 25 March 2003 (age 23)
- Place of birth: Herten, Netherlands
- Height: 1.75 m (5 ft 9 in)
- Position: Midfielder

Team information
- Current team: Heerenveen
- Number: 14

Youth career
- –2012: SHH
- 2012–2015: VVV-Venlo
- 2015–2020: SHH
- 2016–2021: VVV-Venlo

Senior career*
Years	Team	Apps	(Gls)
2021–2024	VVV-Venlo	68	(10)
2024–	Heerenveen	35	(3)
- * Club domestic league appearances and goals as of 30 December 2025

Levi Smans (born 25 March 2003) is a Dutch professional footballer who plays as a midfielder for Eredivisie club Heerenveen.

== Career ==
=== VVV-Venlo ===
Smans returned to the VVV-Venlo youth academy in 2020 from amateur club SHH, after having already played for the club at under-10 and 11 levels. Ahead of the 2021–22 season, he was promoted to the first team alongside six other academy players. On 13 August 2021, he made his professional debut under head coach Jos Luhukay, replacing Joeri Schroyen in a 2–1 away loss to TOP Oss. He scored his first goal in a league game against Dordrecht on 5 September, which proved to be the winner as the match ended 1–0. On 15 September, Smans signed his first professional contract with VVV until 2025.

Smans impressed during his first season at VVV-Venlo, receiving the Jan Klaassens Award in August 2022, the yearly award for VVV's best academy player. The award was presented to him by technical director Willem Janssen, who had himself been the first recipient of the award in 2004.

=== Heerenveen ===
On 24 May 2024, Heerenveen announced an agreement for the signing of Smans on a four-year deal, to be effective as of 1 July 2024. The fee was undisclosed by the club, but reported to be several hundred thousand euros. He made his debut in the Eredivisie in a 1–0 away defeat against AFC Ajax on the 11 August 2024, appearing as a second-half substitute for Espen van Ee. He scored his first league goal for the club with the opening goal in a 1–1 draw against RKC Waalwijk on 29 November 2024. In August 2025, Smans had to be withdrawn early in the second half of a 1–1 draw against FC Volendam having suffered a serious knee injury, following a challenge from Alex Plat.

== Career statistics ==
As of match played 10 May 2024

Appearances and goals by club, season and competition
Club	Season	League			KNVB Cup		Other		Total	
Club	Season	Division	Apps	Goals	Apps	Goals	Apps	Goals	Apps	Goals
VVV-Venlo	2021–22	Eerste Divisie	20	1	1	0	—		21	1
VVV-Venlo	2022–23	Eerste Divisie	13	0	1	0	2 (Note: Appearances in Eredivisie promotion/relegation playoffs)	0	16	0
VVV-Venlo	2023–24	Eerste Divisie	35	9	1	0	—		36	9
VVV-Venlo	Total		68	10	3	0	2	0	73	10
Heerenveen	2024–25	Eredivisie	0	0	0	0	—		0	0
Career total			68	10	3	0	2	0	73	10
