= VVV-Venlo 0–13 AFC Ajax =

Football match

VVV-Venlo 0–13 Ajax
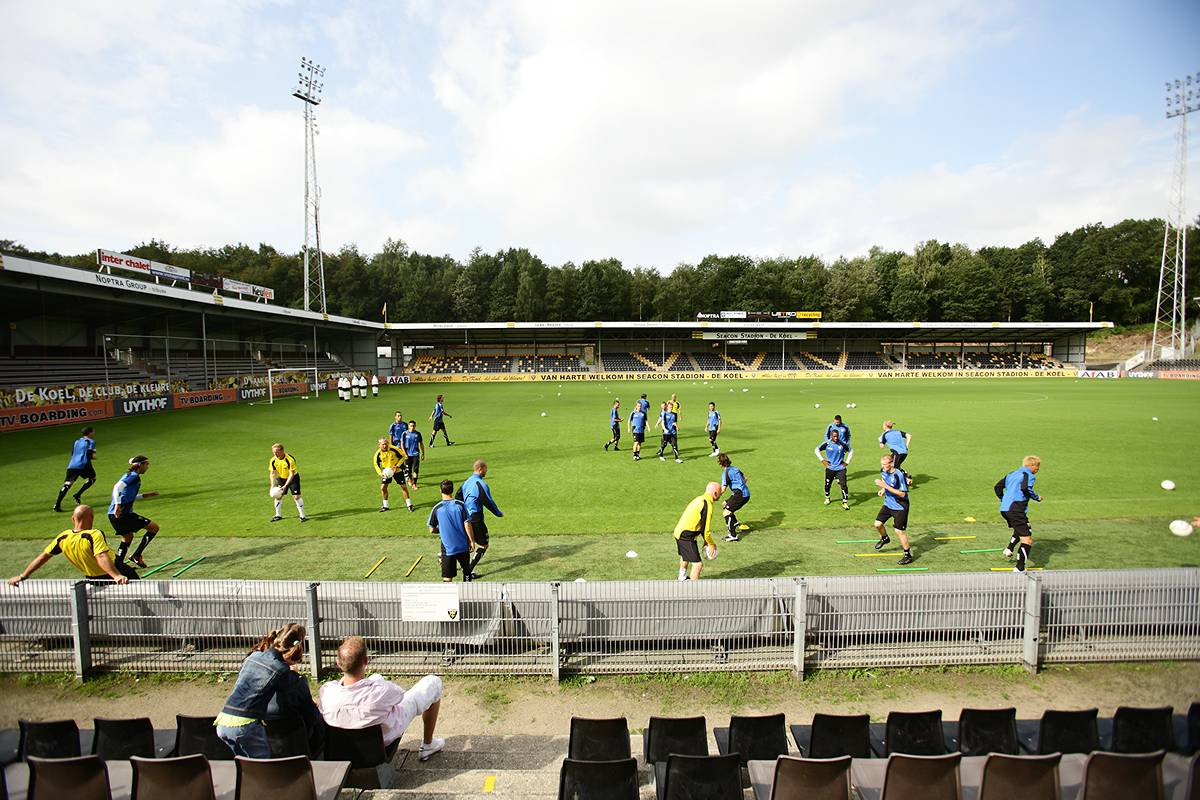
- De Koel in Venlo held the match
- Event: 2020–21 Eredivisie
VVV-Venlo	Ajax
0	13
- Date: 24 October 2020
- Venue: De Koel, Venlo
- Referee: Danny Makkelie
- Attendance: 0 (Note: The match was played behind closed doors due to the COVID-19 pandemic in the Netherlands.)

The 2020–21 Eredivisie match between VVV-Venlo and Ajax at De Koel, Venlo, took place on Saturday, 24 October 2020. Ajax won the match 13–0, setting a new record for the largest win in the history of the league. This result beat Ajax's 12–1 win over Vitesse back in the 1971–72 season.

== Match ==
=== Overview ===
Jurgen Ekkelenkamp opened the score for Ajax in the 12th minute, with Lassina Traoré's first goal of the evening making it 2–0 within only five minutes. Ajax scored two more goals before the half-time break, with a second goal by Traoré and a strike from Dušan Tadić.

Venlo were left with 10 men after 52 minutes when Christian Kum was sent off after the video assistant referee changed his yellow card for violent conduct to a red. Venlo further collapsed after the sending off with four Ajax goals in five minutes by Traoré, Antony, Ekkelenkamp and Daley Blind. Traoré added his fourth after 65 minutes, and two goals by Klaas-Jan Huntelaar in the 74th and 76th minute made it 11–0. With 12 minutes left, Lisandro Martínez made it 12–0 before Traoré scored his fifth of the game in the 87th minute.

=== Records ===
Erik ten Hag's side recorded their biggest victory in club history, beating their own Eredivisie record from 1972 when they thrashed Vitesse 12–1.

Lassina Traoré became the first Ajax player to score five goals in an Eredivisie game since Marco van Basten in 1985 and the first to record three assists for the club in a league match since Frenkie de Jong in 2017. The display meant that Traoré became the first player this century to be directly involved in eight goals in an Eredivisie match.

It was the biggest ever defeat in a professional game for Venlo, with their previous worst performance being a 10–1 loss to PSV Eindhoven in 1964.

== Summary ==
=== Details ===
24 October 2020
15:30 CET

VVV-Venlo	0–13	Ajax
	Report	Ekkelenkamp 12', 57'; Traoré 17', 32', 54', 65', 87'; Tadić 44'; Antony 55'; Blind 59'; Huntelaar 74' (pen.), 76'; Martínez 78'

De Koel, Venlo
Attendance: 0
Referee: Danny Makkelie

VVV-Venlo	Ajax

GK	16	(Netherlands) Delano van Crooij
RB	2	(Germany) Tobias Pachonik
CB	14	(Netherlands) Christian Kum	(red card) 52'
CB	3	(Netherlands) Arjan Swinkels
LB	26	(Germany) Lukas Schmitz
RM	8	(France) Zinédine Machach		(substituted off) 46'
CM	6	(Netherlands) Danny Post (c)	(yellow card) 18'	(substituted off) 46'
CM	21	(Netherlands) Evert Linthorst		(substituted off) 69'
LM	27	(Netherlands) Torino Hunte		(substituted off) 55'
ST	11	(Greece) Giorgos Giakoumakis		(substituted off) 79'
ST	10	(Netherlands) Vito van Crooij
Substitutes:
GK	22	(Netherlands) Bram Verbong
GK	30	(Netherlands) Jens Craenmehr
DF	4	(Switzerland) Roy Gelmi		(substituted on) 55'
DF	5	(Germany) Steffen Schäfer
DF	15	(Netherlands) Simon Janssen		(substituted on) 46'
DF	17	(Netherlands) Tristan Dekker
DF	18	(Netherlands) Stan van Dijck		(substituted on) 69'
MF	9	(Croatia) Ante Ćorić
MF	24	(Netherlands) Wassim Essanoussi		(substituted on) 79'
FW	7	(Netherlands) Guus Hupperts
FW	19	(Netherlands) Yahcuroo Roemer		(substituted on) 46'
FW	25	(Curaçao) Jafar Arias
Manager:
(Netherlands) Hans de Koning

GK	24	(Cameroon) André Onana
LB	5	(Netherlands) Sean Klaiber
CB	3	(Netherlands) Perr Schuurs
CB	17	(Netherlands) Daley Blind	(substituted off) 70'
RB	31	(Argentina) Nicolás Tagliafico	(substituted off) 46'
DM	6	(Netherlands) Davy Klaassen
DM	8	(Netherlands) Ryan Gravenberch	(substituted off) 70'
RW	39	(Brazil) Antony	(substituted off) 70'
AM	18	(Netherlands) Jurgen Ekkelenkamp
LW	10	(Serbia) Dušan Tadić (c)	(substituted off) 46'
ST	23	(Burkina Faso) Lassina Traoré
Substitutes:
GK	1	(Netherlands) Maarten Stekelenburg
GK	33	(Croatia) Dominik Kotarski
DF	12	(Morocco) Noussair Mazraoui
DF	21	(Argentina) Lisandro Martínez	(substituted on) 46'
MF	4	(Mexico) Edson Álvarez	(substituted on) 70'
MF	19	(Morocco) Zakaria Labyad	(substituted on) 70'
MF	25	(Netherlands) Kenneth Taylor
FW	7	(Brazil) David Neres
FW	9	(Netherlands) Klaas-Jan Huntelaar	(substituted on) 70'
FW	11	(Netherlands) Quincy Promes	(substituted on) 46'
Manager:
(Netherlands) Erik ten Hag
