= Carl Johansson =

Carl Johansson may refer to:

- Carl Johansson (footballer, born 1994), Swedish footballer
- Carl Johansson (footballer, born 1998), Swedish footballer
- Carl Edvard Johansson (1864–1943), Swedish inventor and scientist
- Carl Hugo Johansson (1887–1977), Swedish sport shooter
