= Herten (disambiguation) =

Herten can refer to:

- Herten, a town in North Rhine-Westphalia, Germany.
- Herten, a village in the southeast of the Netherlands
- Herten, a small village in the northeast of Belgium, now part of Wellen
- Herten in Frauenfeld, Switzerland
- Herten, Rheinfelden, a village forming part of Rheinfelden, Germany.
