= Lassina Traoré =

Burkinabé footballer (born 2001)

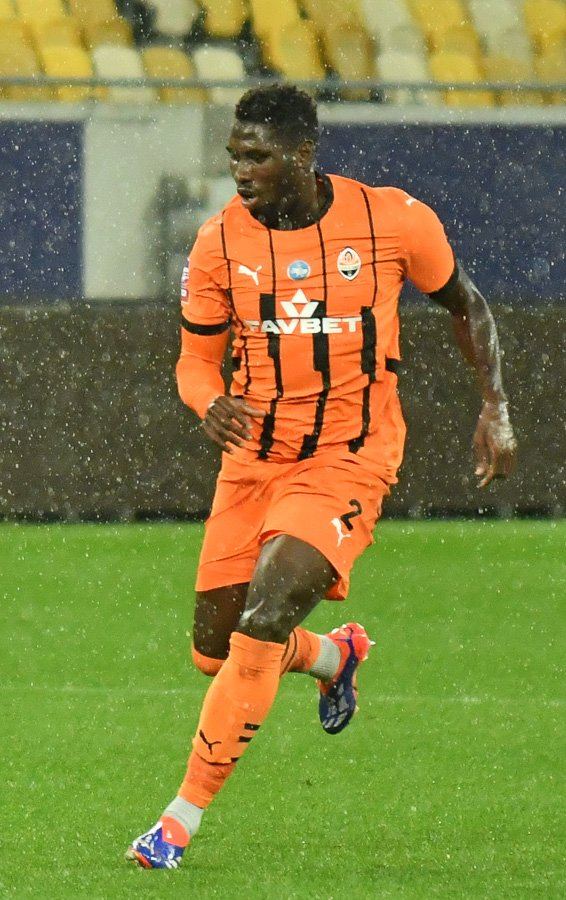
- Lassina Traoré with Shakhtar Donetsk in 2024

Personal information
- Full name: Lassina Chamste Soudine Franck Traoré
- Date of birth: 12 January 2001 (age 25)
- Place of birth: Bobo Dioulasso, Burkina Faso
- Height: 1.83 m (6 ft 0 in)
- Position: Forward

Team information
- Current team: Shakhtar Donetsk
- Number: 2

Youth career
- 2012–2017: Rahimo
- 2017–2019: Ajax Cape Town

Senior career*
Years	Team	Apps	(Gls)
2019–2021	Jong Ajax	42	(23)
2019–2021	Ajax	22	(9)
2021–	Shakhtar Donetsk	85	(26)

International career^{‡}
2017–	Burkina Faso	39	(17)
- * Club domestic league appearances and goals as of 30 October 2026 ‡ National team caps and goals as of 17 November 2026

Lassina Chamste Soudine Franck Traoré (born 12 January 2001) is a Burkinabé professional footballer who plays as a forward for Ukrainian Premier League club Shakhtar Donetsk and the Burkina Faso national team.

== Club career ==
=== Rahimo ===
Traoré began his football career in the youth ranks of Rahimo in his hometown of Bobo-Dioulasso, Burkina Faso. He was scouted by Ajax and brought to South Africa, where was stalled at the clubs' satellite club Ajax Cape Town until he was old enough to legally transfer to Amsterdam.

=== Ajax Cape Town ===
Shortly after his 18th birthday, Traoré moved to Europe joining Ajax in January 2019, on a three-and-a-half-year contract. He had previously played for Rahimo in Burkina Faso and was on the books of Ajax Cape Town in South Africa where he finished as top scorer of the reserves team before departing for the Netherlands.

=== Ajax ===
Traoré was named on the bench for the first time in Ajax's fateful second leg defeat to Tottenham Hotspur in the semi-finals of the UEFA Champions League on 8 May 2019, before making his debut in the final seconds of their 4–1 win over Utrecht in the league four days later. He would have to wait over five months for his next first-team appearance as a late substitute in a 4–0 win against Feyenoord on 27 October 2019.

On 24 October 2020, Traoré scored five goals and assisted a further three in a record-breaking 13–0 league victory over VVV-Venlo. Three days later, Traoré earned a penalty-kick and scored his first goal in European competition in a 2–2 draw away to Atalanta in the group stage of the UEFA Champions League.

=== Shakhtar Donetsk ===
On 18 June 2021, it was announced that Traoré had joined Ukrainian Premier League side Shakhtar Donetsk for a fee of €10 million. On 22 September, Traoré scored twice in Shakhtar's 3–0 win against rivals Dynamo Kyiv in the 2021 Ukrainian Super Cup.

On 19 May 2026, Shakhtar announced that Traoré had extended his contract with the club until 30 June 2031.

== International career ==
Traoré made his international debut for Burkina Faso on 4 May 2017, during a friendly match against Benin.

On 8 December 2025, Traoré was named among the 25 players selected by head coach Brama Traoré to represent Burkina Faso at the 2025 Africa Cup of Nations.

== Playing style ==
Lassina Traoré is 1.83 m tall, but his physique makes him well suited for a physical playing style. As a team player, he is technically competent beyond being a typical ‘target man’.

== Personal life ==
Traoré's mother was a former professional footballer and captained the Burkina Faso women's national football team. His cousin, Bertrand Traoré, is also a professional footballer, who last played as a right winger for Sunderland.

== Career statistics ==
=== Club ===
As of match played 3 November 2026

Appearances and goals by club, season and competition
Club	Season	League			National cup (Note: Includes KNVB Cup, Ukrainian Cup)		Continental		Other		Total	
Club	Season	Division	Apps	Goals	Apps	Goals	Apps	Goals	Apps	Goals	Apps	Goals
Jong Ajax	2018–19	Eerste Divisie	14	8	0	0	—		—		14	8
Jong Ajax	2019–20	Eerste Divisie	17	13	0	0	—		—		17	13
Jong Ajax	2020–21	Eerste Divisie	11	2	0	0	—		—		11	2
Jong Ajax	Total		42	23	0	0	—		—		42	23
Ajax	2018–19	Eredivisie	1	0	0	0	0	0	—		1	0
Ajax	2019–20	Eredivisie	9	2	2	2	1 (Note: Appearance(s) in UEFA Europa League)	0	0	0	12	4
Ajax	2020–21	Eredivisie	12	7	0	0	6 (Note: Five appearances and one goal in UEFA Champions League, one appearance in UEFA Europa League)	1	—		18	8
Ajax	Total		22	9	2	2	7	1	0	0	31	12
Shakhtar Donetsk	2021–22	Ukrainian Premier League	7	6	—		6 (Note: Appearance(s) in UEFA Champions League)	1	1 (Note: Appearance in Ukrainian Super Cup)	2	14	9
Shakhtar Donetsk	2022–23	Ukrainian Premier League	21	5	—		10 (Note: Six appearances and one goal in UEFA Champions League, four appearances in UEFA Europa League)	1	—		31	6
Shakhtar Donetsk	2023–24	Ukrainian Premier League	16	4	2	0	2	0	—		20	4
Shakhtar Donetsk	2024–25	Ukrainian Premier League	22	4	3	1	6	0	—		31	5
Shakhtar Donetsk	2025–26	Ukrainian Premier League	13	7	0	0	6 (Note: Two appearances in UEFA Europa League, four appearances in UEFA Conference League)	0	—		19	7
Shakhtar Donetsk	2026–27	Ukrainian Premier League	6	0	1	0	3	0	—		10	0
Shakhtar Donetsk	Total		85	26	6	1	33	2	1	2	125	31
Career total			149	57	8	3	40	3	1	2	198	65

=== International ===
As of match played 17 November 2026

Appearances and goals by national team and year
National team	Year	Apps	Goals
Burkina Faso	2017	4	3
Burkina Faso	2019	4	0
Burkina Faso	2020	4	2
Burkina Faso	2021	5	2
Burkina Faso	2022	0	0
Burkina Faso	2023	1	0
Burkina Faso	2024	10	4
Burkina Faso	2025	5	4
Burkina Faso	2026	6	2
Total		39	17

Scores and results list Burkina Faso's goal tally first, score column indicates score after each Traoré goal.

List of international goals scored by Lassina Traoré
No.	Date	Venue	Opponent	Score	Result	Competition
1	4 May 2017	4 August Stadium, Ouagadougou, Burkina Faso	Benin	1–0	1–1	Friendly
2	21 May 2017	L'Amitié Stadium, Cotonou, Benin	Benin	1–1	2–2	Friendly
3	21 May 2017	L'Amitié Stadium, Cotonou, Benin	Benin	2–1	2–2	Friendly
4	12 November 2020	4 August Stadium, Ouagadougou, Burkina Faso	Malawi	1–0	3–1	2021 Africa Cup of Nations qualification
5	12 November 2020	4 August Stadium, Ouagadougou, Burkina Faso	Malawi	2–0	3–1	2021 Africa Cup of Nations qualification
6	5 June 2021	Stade National, Abidjan, Ivory Coast	Ivory Coast	1–0	1–2	Friendly
7	2 September 2021	Marrakech Stadium, Marrakesh, Morocco	Niger	1–0	2–0	2022 FIFA World Cup qualification
8	6 June 2024	Cairo International Stadium, Cairo, Egypt	Egypt	1–2	1–2	2026 FIFA World Cup qualification
9	10 June 2024	26 March Stadium, Bamako, Mali	Sierra Leone	2–0	2–2	2026 FIFA World Cup qualification
10	10 September 2024	26 March Stadium, Bamako, Mali	Malawi	1–0	3–1	2025 Africa Cup of Nations qualification
11	10 September 2024	26 March Stadium, Bamako, Mali	Malawi	2–0	3–1	2025 Africa Cup of Nations qualification
12	21 March 2025	Ben M'Hamed El Abdi Stadium, El Jadida, Morocco	Djibouti	4–0	4–1	2026 FIFA World Cup qualification
13	24 March 2025	24 September Stadium, Bissau, Guinea-Bissau	Guinea-Bissau	1–0	2–1	2026 FIFA World Cup qualification
14	24 March 2025	24 September Stadium, Bissau, Guinea-Bissau	Guinea-Bissau	2–1	2–1	2026 FIFA World Cup qualification
15	31 December 2025	Stade Mohammed V, Casablanca, Morocco	Sudan	1–0	2–0	2025 Africa Cup of Nations
16	25 September 2026	4 August Stadium, Ouagadougou, Burkina Faso	Benin	1–0	1–1	2027 Africa Cup of Nations qualification
17	17 November 2026	Nouakchott Olympic Stadium, Nouakchott, Mauritania	Mauritania	2–0	3–1	2027 Africa Cup of Nations qualification

== Honours ==
Ajax

- Eredivisie: 2018–19, 2020–21
- KNVB Cup: 2018–19, 2020–21

Shakhtar Donetsk

- Ukrainian Premier League: 2022–23, 2023–24, 2025–26
- Ukrainian Cup: 2023–24, 2024–25
- Ukrainian Super Cup: 2021

Individual

- Eredivisie Player of the Month: October 2020
