= Joep Kluskens =

Dutch footballer (born 2002)

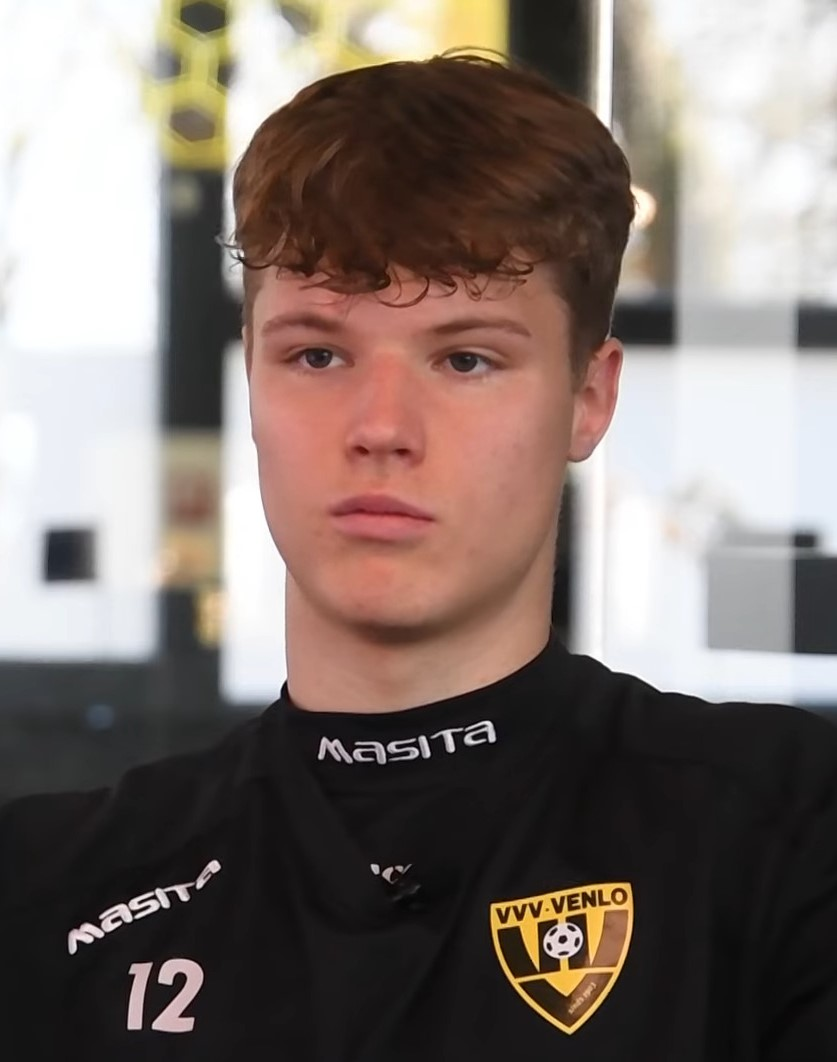
- Kluskens in 2023

Personal information
- Date of birth: 9 November 2002 (age 24)
- Place of birth: Nederweert, Netherlands
- Position: Defensive midfielder

Team information
- Current team: Llapi
- Number: 14

Youth career
- 2008–2011: RKSV Merefeldia
- 2011–2014: Fortuna Sittard
- 2014–2019: PSV
- 2019–2020: Fortuna Sittard

Senior career*
Years	Team	Apps	(Gls)
2020–2026	VVV-Venlo	66	(1)
2026–	Llapi	0	(0)
- * Club domestic league appearances and goals as of 28 April 2026

Joep Kluskens (born 9 November 2002) is a Dutch professional footballer who plays as a defensive midfielder for Kosovo Superleague club Llapi.

== Career ==
=== VVV-Venlo ===
Kluskens began playing football with amateur club RSKV Merefeldia before joining the Fortuna Sittard academy in 2011. He later moved to PSV, where he spent five years in the club's youth system. In 2019, he returned to Fortuna Sittard, and a year later joined VVV-Venlo.

He made his league debut for VVV on 25 April 2022 in a 6–1 away defeat to Jong Ajax, coming on shortly before full time for Ian Hussein Ngobi following an introduction by head coach Jos Luhukay. One week later, he made his first start, featuring in a 2–2 draw against Excelsior.

During the 2023 season, Kluskens established himself as VVV's first-choice midfielder, becoming a regular in the starting lineup and contributing consistently both defensively and in possession.

On 14 May 2024, he signed a new contract with the club, extending his stay until 2026. Later that summer, in August 2024, Kluskens sustained a serious knee injury that ruled him out for an extended period.

After an absence of more than nine months, Kluskens returned to competitive action on 2 May 2025, coming on at half-time for Gabin Blancquart in a 2–1 Eerste Divisie defeat to Emmen. One week later, in the final match of the season, he scored his first senior competitive goal in a 7–2 home defeat to ADO Den Haag.

=== Llapi ===
In June 2026, Kluskens signed a three-year contract with Kosovo Superleague club Llapi.

== Career statistics ==
As of match played 24 April 2026

Appearances and goals by club, season and competition
Club	Season	League			National cup		Other		Total	
Club	Season	Division	Apps	Goals	Apps	Goals	Apps	Goals	Apps	Goals
VVV-Venlo	2021–22	Eerste Divisie	3	0	0	0	—		3	0
VVV-Venlo	2022–23	Eerste Divisie	16	0	2	0	1 (Note: Appearances in Eredivisie promotion/relegation playoffs)	0	19	0
VVV-Venlo	2023–24	Eerste Divisie	29	0	1	0	—		27	0
VVV-Venlo	2024–25	Eerste Divisie	2	1	0	0	—		2	1
VVV-Venlo	2025–26	Eerste Divisie	16	0	1	0	—		17	0
VVV-Venlo	Total		66	1	4	0	1	0	71	1
Llapi	2026–27	Kosovo Superleague	3	0	0	0	—		3	0
Career total			66	1	4	0	1	0	71	1
