= 2020–21 Eredivisie =

65th season of the Eredivisie

Eredivisie
- Season: 2020–21
- Dates: 12 September 2020 – 16 May 2021
- Champions: Ajax (35th title)
- Relegated: Emmen; VVV-Venlo; ADO Den Haag
- Champions League: Ajax; PSV Eindhoven
- Europa League: AZ
- Europa Conference League: Vitesse; Feyenoord
- Matches: 306
- Goals: 920 (3.01 per match)
- Top goalscorer: Giorgos Giakoumakis (26 goals)
- Biggest home win: Sparta Rotterdam 6–0 ADO Den Haag (22 November 2020); Feyenoord 6–0 VVV-Venlo (6 March 2021)
- Biggest away win: VVV-Venlo 0–13 Ajax (24 October 2020)
- Highest scoring: VVV-Venlo 0–13 Ajax (24 October 2020)
- Longest winning run: 7 matches Ajax
- Longest unbeaten run: 23 matches Ajax
- Longest winless run: 22 matches Emmen
- Longest losing run: 12 matches VVV-Venlo

The 2020–21 Eredivisie was the 65th season of the Eredivisie since its establishment in 1955. The season began on 12 September 2020 and concluded on 16 May 2021.

On 2 February 2021, the KNVB announced that effective immediately clubs would be allowed to make an extra substitution for suspected concussions as part of an IFAB sanctioned trial. This trial will allow teams to make up to six substitutions across four breaks in the match instead of five substitutions across three breaks in the match.

Ajax, having won the title in 2018–19, were the title holders, since the 2019–20 edition was cancelled due to the COVID-19 pandemic in the Netherlands after 25 matchdays and the title was not awarded.

Ajax successfully defended their title, becoming the champions in round 31 after beating Emmen 4–0 in their own Johan Cruyff Arena in Amsterdam on 2 May 2021.

== Teams ==
A total of 18 teams are taking part in the league. There were no changes in the league's makeup due to the COVID-19 pandemic.

Locations of the 2020–21 Eredivisie teams
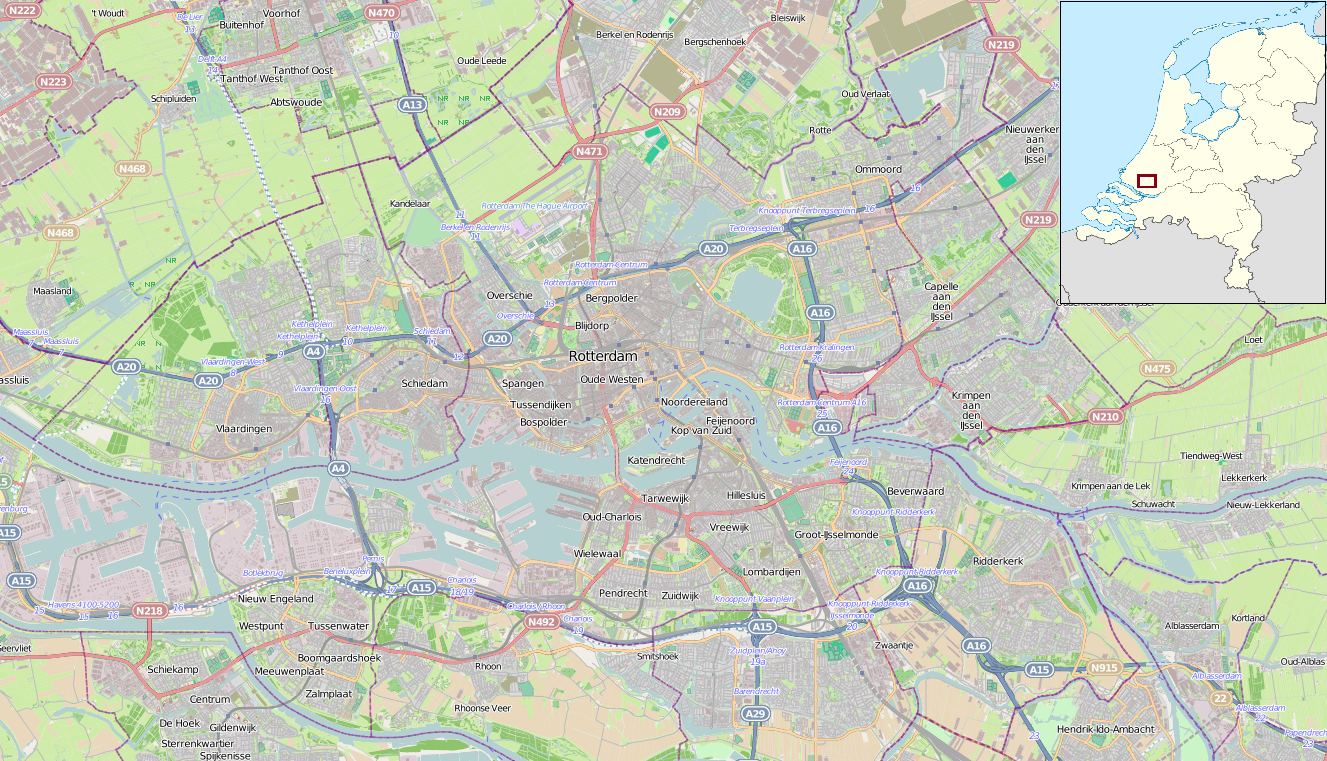
Rotterdam Eredivisie football clubs

=== Stadiums and locations ===
Club	Location	Venue	Capacity
ADO Den Haag	The Hague	Cars Jeans Stadion	15,000
Ajax	Amsterdam	Johan Cruijff ArenA	55,500
AZ	Alkmaar	AFAS Stadion	17,023
FC Emmen	Emmen	De Oude Meerdijk	8,600
Feyenoord	Rotterdam	De Kuip	52,000
Fortuna Sittard	Sittard	Fortuna Sittard Stadion	10,300
FC Groningen	Groningen	Hitachi Capital Mobility Stadion	22,550
sc Heerenveen	Heerenveen	Abe Lenstra Stadion	27,224
Heracles Almelo	Almelo	Erve Asito	12,080
PEC Zwolle	Zwolle	MAC³PARK stadion	14,000
PSV	Eindhoven	Philips Stadion	36,500
RKC Waalwijk	Waalwijk	Mandemakers Stadion	7,500
Sparta Rotterdam	Rotterdam	Spartastadion Het Kasteel	11,000
FC Twente	Enschede	De Grolsch Veste	30,205
FC Utrecht	Utrecht	Stadion Galgenwaard	23,750
Vitesse	Arnhem	GelreDome	21,248
VVV-Venlo	Venlo	Covebo Stadion – De Koel	8,000
Willem II	Tilburg	Koning Willem II Stadion	14,500

=== Personnel and kits ===
Note: Flags indicate national team as has been defined under FIFA eligibility rules. Players and managers may hold more than one non-FIFA nationality.

Team	Manager	Captain	Kit manufacturer	Shirt sponsor
ADO Den Haag	(Netherlands) Ruud Brood	(Netherlands) Daryl Janmaat	(Italy) Erreà	Cars Jeans
Ajax	(Netherlands) Erik ten Hag	(Serbia) Dušan Tadić	(Germany) Adidas	Ziggo
AZ	(Netherlands) Pascal Jansen (ad int.)	(Netherlands) Teun Koopmeiners	(United States) Nike	AFAS Software
FC Emmen	(Netherlands) Dick Lukkien	(Netherlands) Michael de Leeuw	(Denmark) Hummel	EasyToys
Feyenoord	(Netherlands) Dick Advocaat	(Netherlands) Steven Berghuis	(Germany) Adidas	Droomparken
Fortuna Sittard	(Netherlands) Sjors Ultee	(Netherlands) Ben Rienstra	(Netherlands) Masita	Hurkmans Groep
FC Groningen	(Netherlands) Danny Buijs	(Netherlands) Arjen Robben	(Germany) Puma	Office Centre
sc Heerenveen	(Netherlands) Johnny Jansen	(Netherlands) Henk Veerman	(Germany) Jako	Ausnutria
Heracles Almelo	(Germany) Frank Wormuth	(Netherlands) Robin Pröpper	(Italy) Acerbis	Asito
PEC Zwolle	(Netherlands) Bert Konterman (ad int.)	(Netherlands) Bram van Polen	(Sweden) Craft	Molecaten
PSV	(Germany) Roger Schmidt	(Netherlands) Denzel Dumfries	(Germany) Puma	Metropoolregio Brainport Eindhoven
RKC Waalwijk	(Netherlands) Fred Grim	(Morocco) Anas Tahiri	(Netherlands) Stanno	Willy Naessens
Sparta Rotterdam	(Netherlands) Henk Fraser	(Morocco) Adil Auassar	(Netherlands) Robey	D&S Groep
FC Twente	(Netherlands) Ron Jans	(Netherlands) Wout Brama	(Spain) Meyba	Pure Energie
FC Utrecht	(Netherlands) René Hake	(Netherlands) Willem Janssen	(United States) Nike	T-Mobile
Vitesse	(Germany) Thomas Letsch	(Netherlands) Remko Pasveer	(United States) Nike	Waterontharder.com
VVV-Venlo	(Netherlands) Jos Luhukay	(Netherlands) Danny Post	(Netherlands) Masita	Seacon Logistics
Willem II	(Montenegro) Željko Petrović	(Netherlands) Jordens Peters	(Netherlands) Robey	DESTIL

=== Managerial changes ===
Team	Outgoing manager	Manner of departure	Date of vacancy	Position in table	Replaced by	Date of appointment	Ref.
ADO Den Haag	(England) Alan Pardew	End of contract	30 June 2020	Preseason	(Serbia) Aleksandar Ranković	1 July 2020	
Fortuna Sittard	(Netherlands) Sjors Ultee	Different role	30 June 2020	Preseason	(Netherlands) Kevin Hofland	1 July 2020	
PSV	(Netherlands) Ernest Faber (ad int.)	End of interim spell	30 June 2020	Preseason	(Germany) Roger Schmidt	1 July 2020	
FC Twente	(Spain) Gonzalo García García	End of contract	30 June 2020	Preseason	(Netherlands) Ron Jans	1 July 2020	
Vitesse	(Netherlands) Edward Sturing (ad int.)	End of interim spell	30 June 2020	Preseason	(Germany) Thomas Letsch	1 July 2020	
FC Utrecht	(Netherlands) John van den Brom	Signed by Genk	7 November 2020	8th	(Netherlands) René Hake	7 November 2020	
ADO Den Haag	(Serbia) Aleksandar Ranković	Sacked	8 November 2020	16th	(Netherlands) Ruud Brood	10 November 2020	
Fortuna Sittard	(Netherlands) Kevin Hofland	Sacked	11 November 2020	18th	(Netherlands) Sjors Ultee	2 December 2020	
AZ	(Netherlands) Arne Slot	Sacked	4 December 2020	7th	(Netherlands) Pascal Jansen (ad int.)	4 December 2020	
Willem II	(Netherlands) Adrie Koster	Sacked	26 January 2021	17th	(Montenegro) Željko Petrović	29 January 2021	
PEC Zwolle	(Netherlands) John Stegeman	Sacked	20 February 2021	13th	(Netherlands) Lee-Roy Echteld (ad int.)	24 February 2021	
PEC Zwolle	(Netherlands) Lee-Roy Echteld (ad int.)	End of interim spell	27 February 2021	12th	(Netherlands) Bert Konterman (ad int.)	27 February 2021	
VVV-Venlo	(Netherlands) Hans de Koning	Sacked	16 March 2021	15th	(Netherlands) Jos Luhukay	17 March 2021	

== Regular competition ==
=== Standings ===
Pos	Team	Pld	W	D	L	GF	GA	GD	Pts	Qualification or relegation
1	Ajax (C)	34	28	4	2	102	23	+79	88	Qualification for the Champions League group stage
2	PSV Eindhoven	34	21	9	4	74	35	+39	72	Qualification for the Champions League second qualifying round
3	AZ	34	21	8	5	75	41	+34	71	Qualification for the Europa League play-off round
4	Vitesse	34	18	7	9	52	38	+14	61	Qualification for the Europa Conference League third qualifying round
5	Feyenoord (O)	34	16	11	7	64	36	+28	59	Qualification for the European competition play-offs (Note: Winner of play-off will qualify to Europa Conference League second qualifying round.)
6	Utrecht	34	13	14	7	52	41	+11	53	Qualification for the European competition play-offs
7	Groningen	34	14	8	12	40	37	+3	50	Qualification for the European competition play-offs
8	Sparta Rotterdam	34	13	8	13	49	48	+1	47	Qualification for the European competition play-offs
9	Heracles Almelo	34	12	8	14	42	53	−11	44	
10	Twente	34	10	11	13	48	50	−2	41	
11	Fortuna Sittard	34	12	5	17	50	58	−8	41	
12	Heerenveen	34	9	12	13	43	49	−6	39	
13	PEC Zwolle	34	9	11	14	44	53	−9	38	
14	Willem II	34	8	7	19	40	68	−28	31	
15	RKC Waalwijk	34	7	9	18	33	55	−22	30	
16	Emmen (R)	34	7	9	18	40	68	−28	30	Qualification for the Relegation play-offs (Note: Seven teams, one from the Eredivisie and six from the Eerste Divisie, play for one spot in the 2021–22 Eredivisie. The remaining six teams play in the 2021–22 Eerste Divisie.)
17	VVV-Venlo (R)	34	6	5	23	43	91	−48	23	Relegation to Eerste Divisie
18	ADO Den Haag (R)	34	4	10	20	29	76	−47	22	Relegation to Eerste Divisie

Source: Eredivisie, Soccerway
Rules for classification: Season in progress: 1) Most points won; 2) Less points lost; 3) Goal difference; 4) Goals scored; 5) Alphabetical order; End of season: 1) Points; 2) Goal difference; 3) Goals scored; 4) Head-to-head points; 5) Head-to-head goal difference; 6) Head-to-head away goals scored; 7) Play-off if relevant for deciding champion, relegation or participating in a European league, otherwise by draw. 8) Penalty shoot-out (only after a play-off)
(C) Champions; (O) Play-off winners; (R) Relegated

=== Results ===
Home \ Away	ADO	AJA	AZ	EMM	FEY	FOR	GRO	HEE	HER	PEC	PSV	RKC	SPA	TWE	UTR	VIT	VVV	WIL
ADO Den Haag		2–4	2–2	0–0	3–2	0–3	0–1	1–1	1–2	0–2	2–2	0–0	1–1	2–4	1–4	0–2	1–4	1–4
Ajax	5–0		2–0	4–0	1–0	5–2	3–1	5–1	5–0	4–0	2–2	3–0	4–2	1–2	1–1	2–1	3–1	3–1
AZ	2–1	0–3		1–0	4–2	1–0	1–2	3–1	5–0	1–1	2–0	3–0	2–0	4–1	0–1	3–1	2–2	5–3
Emmen	1–1	0–5	0–1		2–3	2–2	0–4	3–1	3–1	3–2	0–2	3–1	1–1	1–4	2–3	1–4	3–5	1–1
Feyenoord	4–2	0–3	2–3	1–1		2–0	2–0	3–0	0–0	1–0	3–1	3–0	1–1	1–1	1–1	0–0	6–0	5–0
Fortuna Sittard	2–0	1–2	3–3	1–3	1–3		1–3	1–3	0–1	2–2	1–3	2–1	0–1	3–0	0–1	3–3	3–2	3–2
Groningen	3–0	1–0	0–0	1–1	0–0	1–0		0–2	0–1	1–0	1–3	2–0	1–2	2–2	0–0	1–1	2–1	1–0
Heerenveen	3–0	1–2	0–3	4–0	3–0	1–3	1–1		1–2	0–2	2–2	1–1	1–2	0–0	0–0	1–0	1–0	2–0
Heracles Almelo	2–0	0–2	1–2	4–0	1–1	1–2	1–0	1–0		2–1	1–1	0–1	1–1	2–2	4–1	0–2	4–0	4–0
PEC Zwolle	0–1	0–2	1–1	0–0	0–2	0–2	1–0	4–1	2–2		0–3	1–1	4–0	1–0	1–1	2–1	2–1	0–0
PSV Eindhoven	4–0	1–1	1–3	2–1	1–1	2–0	1–0	2–2	3–0	4–2		2–0	1–0	3–0	2–1	3–1	4–1	3–0
RKC Waalwijk	0–1	0–1	1–3	1–0	2–2	1–2	3–1	1–1	3–0	1–1	1–4		0–2	2–1	1–2	0–1	3–2	1–1
Sparta Rotterdam	6–0	0–1	4–4	2–1	0–2	1–2	2–3	1–4	1–1	3–2	3–5	2–0		0–0	0–0	3–0	2–0	0–2
Twente	3–2	1–3	1–3	1–1	2–2	2–0	3–1	0–0	1–1	5–1	1–1	0–2	0–2		1–2	1–2	0–1	1–1
Utrecht	1–1	0–3	2–2	0–1	1–2	1–1	2–2	1–1	2–0	3–3	1–1	3–1	1–0	2–1		1–3	3–1	3–2
Vitesse	0–0	1–3	2–1	3–1	1–0	2–0	1–0	1–1	3–0	2–1	2–1	1–1	2–0	0–2	1–0		4–1	0–0
VVV-Venlo	1–2	0–13	1–4	0–4	0–3	1–3	0–1	1–1	3–2	2–2	0–2	3–3	0–1	1–2	1–1	4–1		2–1
Willem II	1–1	1–1	0–1	2–0	1–4	2–1	2–3	3–1	4–0	1–3	0–2	1–0	1–3	0–3	0–6	1–3	2–1	

Source: Eredivisie, Soccerway
Legend: Blue = home team win; Yellow = draw; Red = away team win.

==== Results by round ====
Team ╲ Round	1	2	3	4	5	6	7	8	9	10	11	12	13	14	15	16	17	18	19	20	21	22	23	24	25	26	27	28	29	30	31	32	33	34
ADO Den Haag	L	L	L	W	L	D	L	L	L	D	D	D	L	L	W	L	L	D	L	D	D	D	L	D	L	L	L	L	D	L	W	W	L	L
Ajax	W	W	W	L	W	W	W	W	W	W	L	W	W	D	D	W	W	W	W	W	D	W	W	D	W	W	W	W	W	W	W	W	W	W
AZ	D	D	D	D	D	D	W	W	W	W	L	W	W	W	D	W	W	W	L	L	W	W	W	W	L	W	W	W	W	L	W	W	D	W
Emmen	L	L	D	D	D	L	L	L	L	L	L	D	D	L	L	L	L	D	L	L	L	L	W	W	D	D	D	W	W	W	L	L	W	W
Feyenoord	W	D	W	W	D	D	W	W	W	D	D	W	L	W	W	W	L	L	L	W	D	W	D	L	W	D	D	W	W	D	L	L	D	W
Fortuna Sittard	L	L	D	L	D	L	L	D	L	L	W	W	D	W	W	L	W	L	W	W	L	W	W	L	L	W	L	L	L	W	W	L	D	L
Groningen	L	W	L	W	D	W	W	L	D	W	W	W	W	L	D	W	D	L	W	L	D	W	D	W	L	D	L	W	L	L	L	W	D	L
Heerenveen	W	W	W	D	L	W	W	L	D	D	D	D	L	L	L	D	D	L	W	D	W	L	D	L	W	L	D	L	W	L	D	D	L	L
Heracles Almelo	W	L	D	L	L	D	W	L	L	L	D	L	W	W	L	W	L	W	D	W	W	L	L	D	W	W	D	L	W	L	W	D	D	L
PEC Zwolle	L	D	W	D	L	D	L	D	D	D	W	L	D	W	D	L	L	W	D	D	D	L	L	W	L	L	W	L	W	W	L	L	L	W
PSV Eindhoven	W	W	D	W	W	L	W	W	D	W	D	W	W	W	D	L	W	W	W	L	W	D	W	D	W	D	L	W	W	W	D	W	W	D
RKC Waalwijk	L	L	L	D	W	D	L	L	D	W	W	L	L	L	L	D	D	L	L	D	D	W	W	D	L	L	W	L	L	L	L	D	W	L
Sparta Rotterdam	L	L	L	D	D	D	L	W	W	L	W	W	L	W	L	W	L	L	D	D	W	L	L	L	D	W	D	W	L	W	W	W	D	W
Twente	W	D	W	D	W	L	W	W	D	L	W	L	W	L	W	L	D	L	D	D	L	W	D	D	D	L	D	L	L	L	L	D	L	W
Utrecht	D	D	W	D	D	W	L	L	D	D	D	L	D	W	D	L	W	W	W	D	D	W	W	L	W	L	W	W	L	W	W	D	D	D
Vitesse	W	W	L	W	W	W	W	W	D	W	L	D	W	L	W	W	W	W	L	D	L	L	L	W	W	W	D	W	D	D	W	L	D	L
VVV-Venlo	W	D	L	L	D	L	L	W	L	D	L	L	L	L	W	W	D	W	W	L	L	L	L	L	L	L	L	L	L	L	L	D	L	L
Willem II	L	W	D	L	L	D	L	L	W	L	L	L	L	D	L	L	D	L	L	W	D	L	L	W	D	W	D	L	L	W	L	L	W	W

Source: worldfootball.net

== Play-offs ==
For both play-offs, who plays who, is not decided based on draws, but the brackets are fully preset based on seeds. The seeds are assigned based on the final ranking after the regular season. The best ranked team will get the highest seed (lowest number). Eredivisie teams are considered to be better ranked than eerste divisie teams.

Contrary to previous years, all rounds are no longer two legs (home and away) but a single leg. The team with the best seed will get the home advantage.

If a match is leveled at the end of the normal playing time, extra time will be played (two periods of 15 minutes each) and followed, if necessary, by a penalty shoot-out to determine the winners.

=== European competition play-offs ===
The four best ranked teams without a European tournament ticket will play for one spot in the 2021–22 UEFA Europa Conference League second qualifying round. The highest seeded team will always play at home.

==== Teams ====
Team	Rank	seed
Feyenoord	5	1
Utrecht	6	2
Groningen	7	3
Sparta Rotterdam	8	4

==== Bracket ====
Semifinals (19 May)
1	Feyenoord	2
4	Sparta Rotterdam	0
2	Utrecht	1
3	Groningen	0

Final (23 May)
1	Feyenoord	2
2	Utrecht	0

==== Semifinals ====
19 May 2021	Utrecht	1–0	Groningen	Utrecht
18:45 CEST	Gustafson 77'	Report		Stadium: Galgenwaard; Attendance: 3,000; Referee: Danny Makkelie

19 May 2021	Feyenoord	2–0	Sparta Rotterdam	Rotterdam
21:00 CEST	Berghuis 31' (pen.); Beugelsdijk 33' (o.g.)	Report		Stadium: De Kuip; Attendance: 6,500; Referee: Jochem Kamphuis

==== Final ====
23 May 2021	Feyenoord	2–0	Utrecht	Rotterdam
12:15 CEST	Sinisterra 25'; Linssen 90'	Report		Stadium: De Kuip; Attendance: 6,500; Referee: Dennis Higler

=== Promotion/relegation play-offs ===
Seven teams, six from the 2020–21 Eerste Divisie and one from the Eredivisie, will play for a spot in the 2021–22 Eredivisie. The remaining six teams will play in the 2021–22 Eerste Divisie. The highest seeded team or the team from the Eredivisie will always play at home.

==== Teams ====
Team	Rank	seed
Emmen	16	1
De Graafschap	3	2
Almere City	4	3
NAC Breda	5	4
Volendam	6	5
N.E.C.	7	6
Roda JC	8	7

==== Bracket ====
First round (15 May)
4	NAC Breda	4
5	Volendam	1
3	Almere City	0
6	N.E.C.	4
2	De Graafschap	2
7	Roda JC	3

Semifinals (20 May)
1	Emmen	1 (3)
4	NAC Breda (p)	1 (4)
6	N.E.C.	3
7	Roda JC	0

Final (23 May)
4	NAC Breda	1
6	N.E.C.	2

==== First round ====
15 May 2021	NAC Breda	4–1	Volendam	Breda
16:30 CEST	De Rooij 33'; Adilehou 52'; Fiorini 65'; Maria 86'	Report	78' Mulattieri	Stadium: Rat Verlegh Stadion; Attendance: 0 Referee: Pol van Boekel

15 May 2021	De Graafschap	2–3	Roda JC	Doetinchem
18:45 CEST	Van Mieghem 13'; Van de Pavert 37'	Report	11' Vente; 72', 75' Goppel	Stadium: De Vijverberg; Attendance: 0 Referee: Edwin van de Graaf

15 May 2021	Almere City	0–4	N.E.C.	Almere
21:00 CEST		Report	36', 75' Okita; 40' (pen.) Bruijn; 70' Vet	Stadium: Yanmar Stadion; Attendance: 0 Referee: Kevin Blom

==== Semifinals ====
20 May 2021	N.E.C.	3–0	Roda JC	Nijmegen
18:45 CEST	Van Rooij 5'; Janga 45+2'; Okita 60'	Report		Stadium: Stadion de Goffert; Attendance: 1,500; Referee: Jeroen Manschot

20 May 2021	Emmen	1–1 (a.e.t.) (3–4 p)	NAC Breda	Emmen
21:00 CEST	Hendriks 80' (o.g.)	Report	16' Immers	Stadium: De Oude Meerdijk; Attendance: 1,200; Referee: Allard Lindhout
	Penalties
	De Leeuw (penalty scored); Araujo (penalty scored); Veendorp (penalty missed); Bijl (penalty scored); Peña (penalty missed)		(penalty scored) Van Hooijdonk; (penalty scored) Fiorini; (penalty scored) Jansen; (penalty missed) Malone; (penalty scored) El Allouchi

==== Final ====
23 May 2021	NAC Breda	1–2	N.E.C.	Breda
18:00 CEST	Van Hooijdonk 70'	Report	26' Odenthal; 89' Okita	Stadium: Rat Verlegh Stadion; Attendance: 2,500; Referee: Björn Kuipers

== Statistics ==
=== Top scorers ===
Rank	Player	Club	Games	Goals	Penalties	Avg.
1	(Greece) Giorgos Giakoumakis	VVV-Venlo	30	26	8	0.87
2	(Netherlands) Donyell Malen	PSV Eindhoven	32	19	0	0.59
3	(Netherlands) Steven Berghuis	Feyenoord	31	18	8	0.58
4	(Brazil) Danilo	Twente	33	17	5	0.52
5	(Netherlands) Rai Vloet	Heracles Almelo	33	16	3	0.48
6	(Netherlands) Myron Boadu	AZ	31	15	0	0.48
6	(Netherlands) Teun Koopmeiners	AZ	31	15	7	0.48
8	(Netherlands) Henk Veerman	Heerenveen	31	14	1	0.45
8	(Germany) Lennart Thy	Sparta Rotterdam	34	14	4	0.41
8	(Serbia) Dušan Tadić	Ajax	34	14	7	0.41

Updated to match(es) played on 16 May 2021.
Source: nos.nl

=== Hat-tricks ===
Rnd	Player	Club	Goals	Date	Home	Score	Away
1	(Greece) Giorgos Giakoumakis	VVV-Venlo	50', 65' (p), 72'	13 September 2020	Emmen	3–5	VVV-Venlo
6	(Burkina Faso) Lassina Traoré	Ajax	17', 32', 54', 65', 87'	24 October 2020	VVV-Venlo	0–13	Ajax
7	(Netherlands) Rai Vloet	Heracles Almelo	2', 63', 71'	1 November 2020	Heracles Almelo	4–1	Utrecht
14	(Netherlands) Bryan Linssen	Feyenoord	48', 58', 90+1'	23 December 2020	Feyenoord	3–0	Heerenveen
16	(Greece) Giorgos Giakoumakis	VVV-Venlo	6' (p), 58', 68', 86' (p)	13 January 2021	ADO Den Haag	1–4	VVV-Venlo
16	(Turkey) Sinan Bakış	Heracles Almelo	26', 44', 64'	12 January 2021	Heracles Almelo	4–0	Emmen
18	(Iran) Reza Ghoochannejhad	PEC Zwolle	58', 62', 70' (p)	22 January 2021	Willem II	1–3	PEC Zwolle
19	(Greece) Giorgos Giakoumakis	VVV-Venlo	16', 28', 43', 79'	27 January 2021	VVV-Venlo	4–1	Vitesse
24	(Netherlands) Myron Boadu	AZ	22', 41', 64'	28 February 2021	AZ	4–2	Feyenoord
30	(Netherlands) Michael de Leeuw	Emmen	58' (p), 89', 90+1'	25 April 2021	Emmen	3–1	Heracles Almelo
31	(Turkey) Sinan Bakış	Heracles Almelo	35', 55', 83' (p)	1 May 2021	Heracles Almelo	4–0	VVV-Venlo

Updated to match(es) played on 16 May 2021.

=== Top assists ===
Rank	Player	Club	Games	Assists	Avg.
1	(Serbia) Dušan Tadić	Ajax	34	17	0.5
2	(Netherlands) Steven Berghuis	Feyenoord	31	13	0.42
3	(Belgium) Mike Trésor	Willem II	34	11	0.32
4	(Netherlands) Joey Veerman	Heerenveen	31	10	0.32
5	(Morocco) Oussama Tannane	Vitesse	29	9	0.31
5	(Sweden) Jesper Karlsson	AZ	32	9	0.28
7	(Netherlands) Vito van Crooij	VVV-Venlo	31	8	0.26
7	(Germany) Philipp Max	PSV Eindhoven	31	8	0.26
7	(Brazil) Antony	Ajax	32	8	0.25
7	(Netherlands) Donyell Malen	PSV Eindhoven	32	8	0.25

Updated to match(es) played on 16 May 2021.
Source: nos.nl

=== Clean sheets ===
As of matches played 16 May 2021

Rank	Player	Club	Clean sheets
1	(Netherlands) Remko Pasveer	Vitesse	12
1	(Netherlands) Sergio Padt	FC Groningen	12
3	(Switzerland) Yvon Mvogo	PSV	11
4	(Nigeria) Maduka Okoye	Sparta Rotterdam	10
4	(Netherlands) Erwin Mulder	sc Heerenveen	10
4	(Netherlands) Marco Bizot	AZ	10
7	(Cameroon) André Onana	Ajax	9
7	(Germany) Janis Blaswich	Heracles Almelo	9
7	(Netherlands) Nick Marsman	Feyenoord	9
10	(Germany) Eric Oelschlägel	FC Utrecht	7

Source: nos.nl

=== Discipline ===
As of matches played 9 May 2021

==== Player ====
- Most yellow cards: 9
  - (Netherlands) Vito van Crooij (VVV-Venlo)
  - (Netherlands) Vurnon Anita (RKC Waalwijk)
- Most red cards: 2
  - (Netherlands) Riechedly Bazoer (Vitesse)
  - (Mexico) Edson Álvarez (Ajax)
  - (Finland) Thomas Lam (PEC Zwolle)
  - (Netherlands) Christian Kum (VVV-Venlo)

==== Club ====
- Most yellow cards: 54
  - Vitesse
  - ADO Den Haag
- Most red cards: 7
  - AZ

== Awards ==
=== Monthly awards ===
Month	Player of the Month		Talent of the Month		Ref.	Team of the Month
Month	Player	Club	Player	Club	Ref.	Team of the Month
September	Clint Leemans	PEC Zwolle	Lutsharel Geertruida	Feyenoord		Mulder (SC Heerenveen); Geertruida (Feyenoord), Bazoer (Vitesse), Bochniewicz (SC Heerenveen), Max (PSV); Sağlam (Willem II), Kudus (Ajax), Leemans (PEC Zwolle); Antony (Ajax), Giakoumakis (VVV-Venlo), Gakpo (PSV).
October	Lassina Traoré	Ajax	Danilo	FC Twente		Lamprou (RKC Waalwijk); Ebuehi (FC Twente), Bazoer (Vitesse), Van Hecke (SC Heerenveen), Haps (Feyenoord); Vloet (Heracles Almelo), Klaassen (Ajax); Openda (Vitesse), Veerman (SC Heerenveen), Danilo (FC Twente), Traoré (Ajax).
November	Davy Klaassen	Ajax	Owen Wijndal	AZ		Lamprou (RKC Waalwijk); Abels (Sparta Rotterdam), Teze (PSV), Senesi (Feyenoord), Wijndal (AZ); Harroui (Sparta Rotterdam), Labyad (Ajax), Klaassen (Ajax); Danilo (FC Twente), Thy (Sparta Rotterdam), Malen (PSV).
December	Antony	Ajax	Owen Wijndal	AZ		Marsman (Feyenoord); Klaiber (Ajax), Araujo (FC Emmen), Janssen (Fortuna Sittard), Wijndal (AZ); Ihattaren (PSV), Koopmeiners (AZ), Gravenberch (Ajax); Antony (Ajax), Huntelaar (Ajax), Thy (Sparta Rotterdam).
January	Giorgos Giakoumakis	VVV-Venlo	Lutsharel Geertruida	Feyenoord		Drommel (FC Twente); Geertruida (Feyenoord), Bazoer (Vitesse), Kemper (ADO Den Haag), Max (PSV); Van de Streek (FC Utrecht), Koopmeiners (AZ), Flemming (Fortuna Sittard); Antony (Ajax), Giakoumakis (VVV-Venlo), Tadić (Ajax)
February	Donyell Malen	PSV	Myron Boadu	AZ		Lamprou (RKC Waalwijk); Sugawara (AZ), Meulensteen (RKC Waalwijk), Touba (RKC Waalwijk), Wijndal (AZ); Toornstra (Feyenoord), Klaassen (Ajax), Kökçü (Feyenoord); Malen (PSV), Haller (Ajax), Boadu (AZ)
March	Ryan Gravenberch	Ajax	Orkun Kökçü	Feyenoord		Marsman (Feyenoord); Beugelsdijk (Sparta Rotterdam), Botteghin (Feyenoord), Bijl (FC Emmen); Gravenberch (Ajax), Kökçü (Feyenoord), Duarte (Sparta Rotterdam), De la Torre (Heracles Almelo); Karlsson (AZ), Zahavi (PSV), Neres (Ajax)
April	Justin Bijlow	Feyenoord	Jurriën Timber	Ajax		Bijlow (Feyenoord); Max (PSV), Martinez (Ajax), Bazoer (Vitesse); Timber (Ajax), Peña (FC Emmen), Klaassen (Ajax), Álvarez (Ajax); Kerk (FC Utrecht), De Leeuw (FC Emmen), Berghuis (Feyenoord)
May	Owen Wijndal	AZ	Mohammed Kudus	Ajax		Stekelenburg (Ajax); Wijndal (AZ), Martinez (Ajax), Timber (Ajax), Svensson (AZ); Kökçü (Feyenoord), Kudus (Ajax), Peña (FC Emmen), Flemming (Fortuna Sittard); Pavlidis (Willem II), Bakış (Heracles Almelo)

=== Annual awards ===
Award	Player	Club	Ref.
Player of the Season	(Serbia) Dušan Tadić	Ajax	
Talent of the Season	(Netherlands) Ryan Gravenberch	Ajax	
Goal of the Season	(Argentina) Marcos Senesi	Feyenoord	
