= Ian Hussein Ngobi =

Dutch footballer (born 2002)

Personal information
- Date of birth: 11 April 2002 (age 24)
- Place of birth: Gennep, Netherlands
- Height: 1.81 m (5 ft 11 in)
- Position: Right-back

Team information
- Current team: Achilles '29

Youth career
- –2011: Vitesse '08
- 2011–2022: VVV-Venlo

Senior career*
Years	Team	Apps	(Gls)
2022	VVV-Venlo	7	(0)
2022–	Achilles '29		
- * Club domestic league appearances and goals as of 14:10, 1 January 2023 (UTC)

Ian Hussein Ngobi (born 11 April 2002) is a Dutch footballer who plays as a right-back for Eerste Klasse club Achilles '29.

== Career ==
Born in Gennep, Limburg, Ngobi is the son of a Dutch mother and Ugandan father. He initially trained as a youngster with Vitesse '08 in his hometown before joining the VVV-Venlo academy.

He made his professional debut for VVV playing as a right back on 12 March 2022 against Helmond Sport in a 3–0 victory. He was credited with assisting Carl Johansson's goal. Ngobi made seven appearances for VVV during the 2021–22 season.

At the start of the 2022–23 season, he failed to make any appearances under new head coach Rick Kruys. In September 2022, Ngobi announced his retirement from professional football, to instead focus on finishing his education. On 14 October 2022, he joined amateur club Achilles '29, competing in the sixth-tier Eerste Klasse.

== Career statistics ==
Appearances and goals by club, season and competition
Club	Season	League			National cup		Other		Total	
Club	Season	Division	Apps	Goals	Apps	Goals	Apps	Goals	Apps	Goals
VVV-Venlo	2022–23	Eerste Divisie	7	0	0	0	—		7	0
Career total			7	0	0	0	—		7	0
