= Wassim Essanoussi =

Dutch footballer (born 2003)

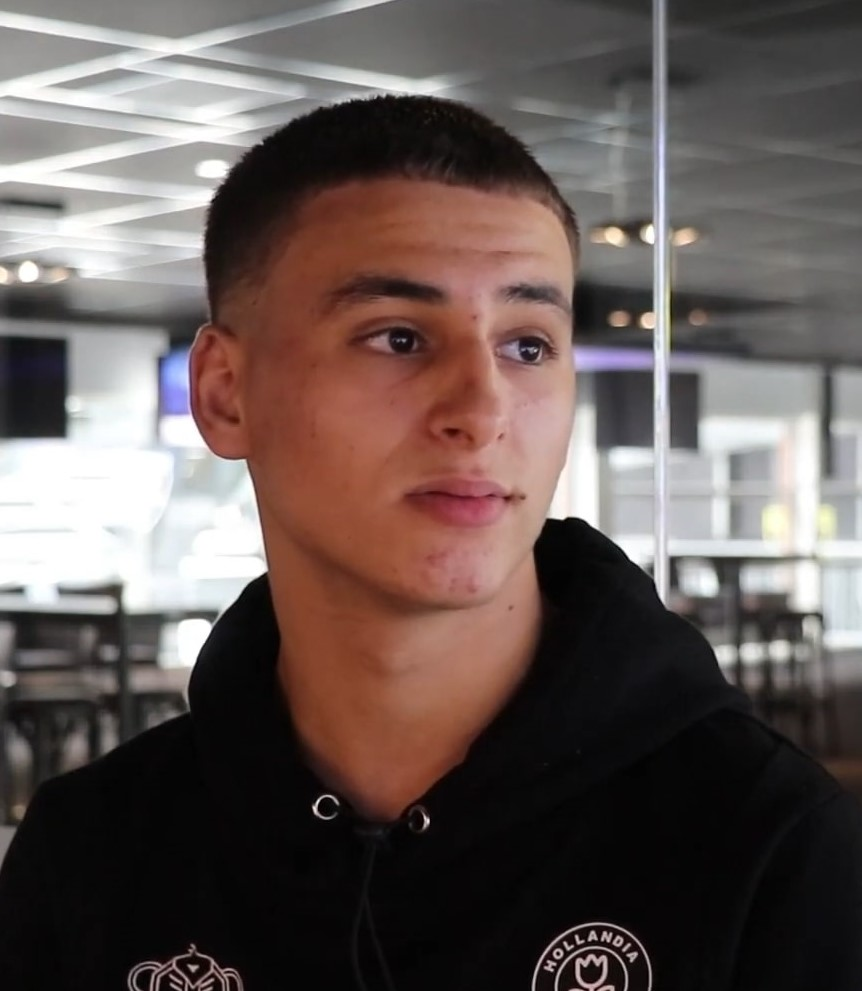
- Essanoussi in 2020

Personal information
- Date of birth: 28 October 2003 (age 23)
- Place of birth: Helmond, Netherlands
- Height: 1.78 m (5 ft 10 in)
- Position: Midfielder

Team information
- Current team: Athletic Torrellano

Youth career
- –2015: Rood Wit '62
- 2015–2020: VVV-Venlo
- 2023–2024: Feyenoord

Senior career*
Years	Team	Apps	(Gls)
2020–2022	VVV-Venlo	20	(1)
2022–2023	Helmond Sport	18	(0)
2025	Villena	11	(2)
2025–	Athletic Torrellano	3	(0)
- * Club domestic league appearances and goals as of 9 November 2025

Wassim Essanoussi (Arabic: وسيم السنوسي; born 28 October 2003) is a Dutch footballer who plays as a midfielder for Spanish Tercera Federación club Athletic Torrellano.

== Career ==
On 3 April 2020, Essanoussi signed his first professional contract with VVV-Venlo. Essanoussi made his professional debut with VVV-Venlo as a late substitute in a record 13–0 Eredivisie loss to AFC Ajax on 24 October 2020.

Essanoussi joined Helmond Sport on 22 June 2022, signing a two-year deal with an option for an additional year. On 1 September 2023, his contract with Helmond Sport was terminated by mutual consent. Later in the month, he signed a contract with Feyenoord to join the club's U21 team.

== Personal life ==
Born in the Netherlands, Essanoussi is of Moroccan descent.
