= Yahcuroo Roemer =

Dutch footballer (born 2001)

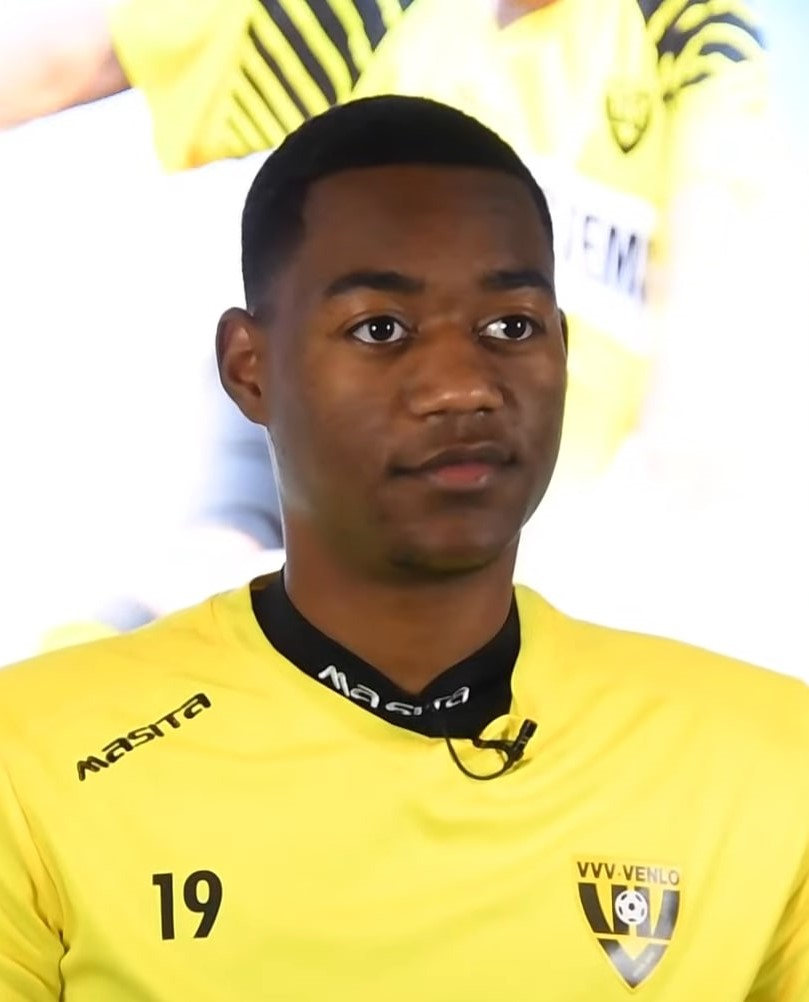
- Yahcuroo Roemer in 2021

Personal information
- Full name: Redon Yahcuroo Roemer
- Date of birth: 22 July 2001 (age 25)
- Place of birth: Amsterdam, Netherlands
- Height: 1.80 m (5 ft 11 in)
- Position: Winger

Team information
- Current team: Hebar Pazardzhik
- Number: 19

Youth career
- –2009: Venlosche Boys
- 2009–2020: VVV-Venlo

Senior career*
Years	Team	Apps	(Gls)
2018–2023	VVV-Venlo	64	(2)
2023	F91 Dudelange	8	(0)
2024	Voluntari	0	(0)
2024	VVV-Venlo	8	(0)
2025	Esperanza Pelt	14	(2)
2025–2026	Lokomotiv GO	27	(3)
2026–	Hebar Pazardzhik	0	(0)
- * Club domestic league appearances and goals as of 11 June 2026

Redon Yahcuroo Roemer (born 22 July 2001) is a professional footballer who plays as a winger for Bulgarian Second League club Hebar Pazardzhik. Born in the Netherlands, he plays for the Suriname national team.

== Career ==
=== VVV-Venlo ===
Roemer was born in Amsterdam, Netherlands, but moved with his mother to Limburg as a three-year-old after his parents divorced. He progressed through the VVV-Venlo youth academy, and was promoted to the first team ahead of the 2018–19 season. Aged 17, he made his professional debut for VVV on 25 September 2018, coming on as a substitute for Patrick Joosten in a 3–0 win over Westlandia in the KNVB Cup.

On 3 April 2020, Roemer signed his first professional contract with VVV, a two-year deal with an option of an additional year. Roemer made his Eredivisie debut for VVV-Venlo on 24 October 2020 as a late substitute in a historic 13–0 home loss to Ajax. On 31 July 2020, he received the Jan Klaassens Award, the yearly award for VVV's best academy player.

Roemer made his breakthrough for VVV in the 2021–22 season, their first season after relegation to the Eerste Divisie. On 30 November 2021, he signed a contract extension with VVV until 2024, with an option for an extra year. Upon signing, technical director Stan Valckx stated: "Yahcuroo … has earned this contract and we naturally hope that he will continue to develop in the coming years and become even more important for VVV."

On 3 July 2023, Roemer and VVV reached an agreement with to terminate his contract, making him a free agent.

=== F91 Dudelange ===
On 4 July 2023, the day after being release from his contract by VVV, Roemer joined Luxembourg National Division club F91 Dudelange. On 12 July, his debut for the club, Roemer scored the winning goal in the 61st minute, slotting home from a tight angle, in a 2–1 victory against St Patrick's Athletic in first qualifying round of the UEFA Europa Conference League.

=== Voluntari ===
On 23 March 2024, Roemer signed with Romanian Liga I club Voluntari on a free transfer.

=== Return to VVV-Venlo ===
On 13 August 2024, Roemer returned to VVV-Venlo on an amateur basis.

== Personal life ==
Born in the Netherlands, Roemer is of Surinamese descent.

== Career statistics ==
As of match played 30 August 2024

Appearances and goals by club, season and competition
Club	Season	League			National cup		Europe		Other		Total	
Club	Season	Division	Apps	Goals	Apps	Goals	Apps	Goals	Apps	Goals	Apps	Goals
VVV-Venlo	2018–19	Eredivisie	0	0	1	0	—		—		1	0
VVV-Venlo	2020–21	Eredivisie	15	0	2	0	—		—		17	0
VVV-Venlo	2021–22	Eerste Divisie	37	2	1	0	—		—		38	2
VVV-Venlo	2022–23	Eerste Divisie	12	0	2	0	—		—		14	0
VVV-Venlo	Total		64	2	6	0	—		—		70	2
F91 Dudelange	2023–24	National Division	8	0	2	0	3 (Note: Appearances in UEFA Europa Conference League)	1	—		13	1
Voluntari	2023–24	Liga I	0	0	2	0	—		—		2	0
VVV-Venlo	2024–25	Eerste Divisie	1	0	0	0	—		—		0	0
Career total			73	2	10	0	3	1	—		86	3
