= Carl Johansson (footballer, born 1998) =

Swedish footballer (born 1998)

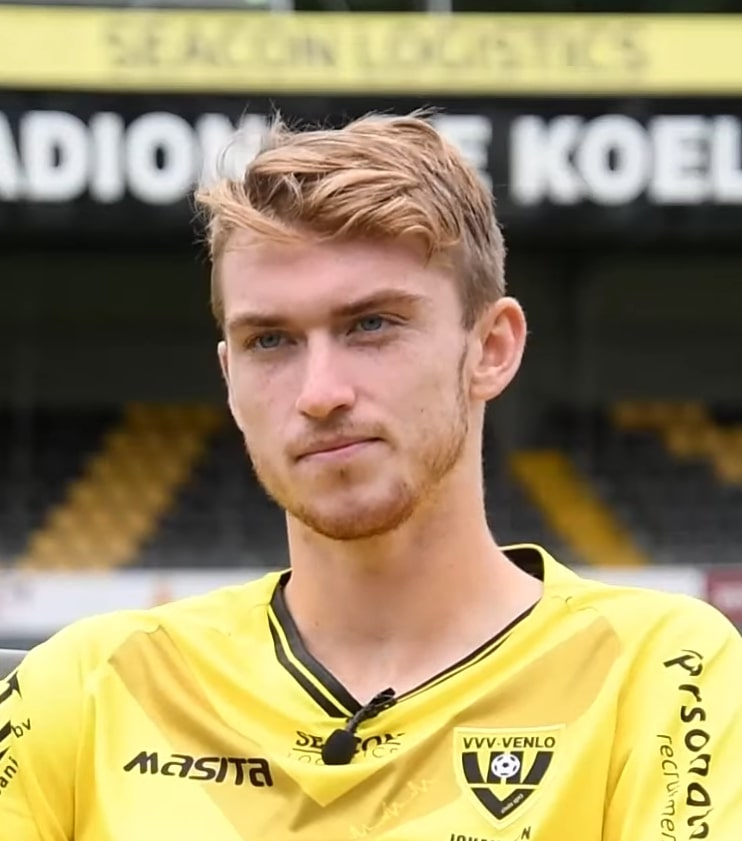
- Johansson in 2021

Personal information
- Full name: Carl Harry Stefan Johansson
- Date of birth: 17 June 1998 (age 28)
- Place of birth: Blomstermåla, Sweden
- Height: 1.73 m (5 ft 8 in)
- Position: Winger

Team information
- Current team: IFK Värnamo
- Number: 7

Youth career
- 2004–2012: Blomstermåla IK
- 2013–2014: Oskarshamns AIK
- 2015: Kalmar FF

Senior career*
Years	Team	Apps	(Gls)
2015	Oskarshamns AIK	2	(0)
2016–2018	Kalmar FF	22	(1)
2018	→ Östers IF (loan)	29	(6)
2019–2021	Östers IF	71	(9)
2021–2023	VVV-Venlo	57	(3)
2023–	IFK Värnamo	78	(2)

International career
2015–2018	Sweden U19	10	(1)
2019	Sweden U21	2	(0)
- * Club domestic league appearances and goals as of 12 November 2026

Carl Harry Stefan Johansson (born 17 June 1998) is a Swedish professional footballer who plays as a winger for IFK Värnamo.

== Club career ==
=== Early years ===
Johansson started playing football for hometown club Blomstermåla IK as a six-year-old. As a 14-year-old, he moved to Oskarshamns AIK's youth department. Johansson made two appearances for Oskarshamn in Ettan Södra in 2014. In December 2014, he was named "Elmare of the Year", an award that goes to a Smålandian athlete who sets a positive example on and off the field.

=== Kalmar FF ===
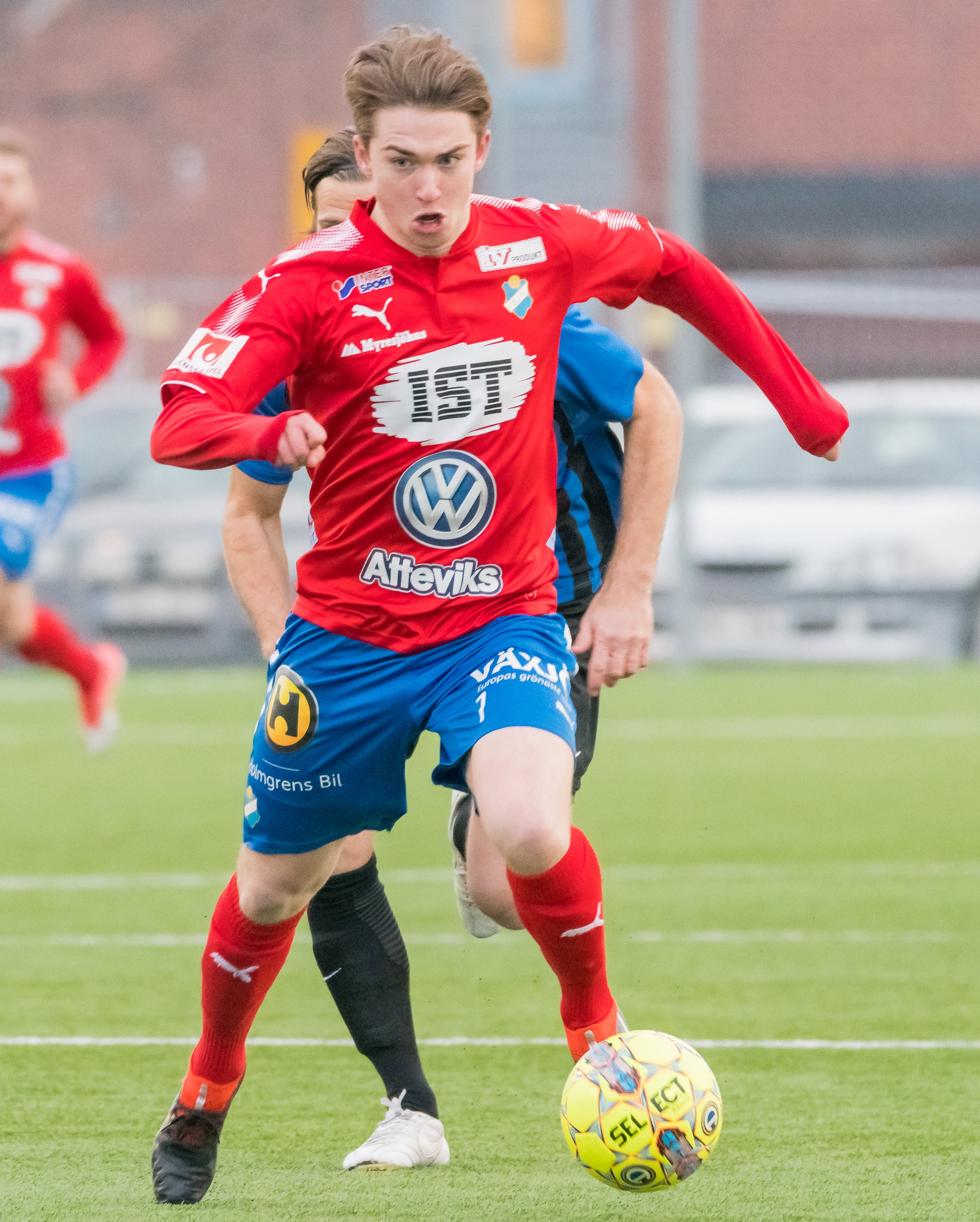
Johansson with Östers IF in 2018

In January 2015, Johansson signed with Kalmar FF competing in the top level Allsvenskan. Prior to the 2016 season, he was promoted to the first team and extended his contract until 2018. He scored his first goal for Kalmar, which proved to be the winner, in a 1–0 victory against IF Elfsborg on 5 March 2016 in Svenska Cupen. Johansson made his Allsvenskan debut on 6 April 2016 in a 4–1 loss against IFK Norrköping. He scored his first Allsvenskan goal on 10 April 2016 in a 3–2 win over IF Elfsborg.

=== Östers IF ===
In January 2018, Johansson sent on a season-long loan to Superettan club Östers IF for the 2018 season.

On 10 February 2019, Johansson signed a permanent deal with Östers IF, penning a three-year contract. Johansson made a total of 111 appearances for the club between 2018 and 2021, scoring 16 goals.

=== VVV-Venlo ===
In August 2021, Johansson signed with recently relegated Dutch Eerste Divisie club VVV-Venlo. He made his debut on the first matchday of the 2021–22 season, replacing Joeri Schroyen in the 59th minute of a 2–2 home draw against NAC Breda. On 9 October 2021, he scored his first goal for the club in the Limburgian derby against MVV Maastricht, securing a late 2–0 win.

Johansson left VVV at the end of the 2022–23 season, as his contract was not extended.

== Personal life ==
Johansson is the nephew of former Swedish international footballers Benno Magnusson and Roger Magnusson.

== Career statistics ==
As of match played 3 June 2023

Appearances and goals by club, season and competition
Club	Season	League			National cup (Note: Includes Svenska Cupen, KNVB Cup)		Other		Total	
Club	Season	Division	Apps	Goals	Apps	Goals	Apps	Goals	Apps	Goals
Oskarshamns AIK	2014	Ettan Södra	2	0	0	0	—		2	0
Kalmar FF	2015	Allsvenskan	0	0	3	1	—		3	1
Kalmar FF	2016	Allsvenskan	12	1	1	0	—		13	1
Kalmar FF	2017	Allsvenskan	10	0	0	0	—		10	0
Kalmar FF	Total		22	1	4	1	—		26	2
Östers IF (loan)	2018	Superettan	29	6	3	0	—		32	6
Östers IF	2019	Superettan	29	5	5	0	2 (Note: Appearances in Superettan relegation playoffs)	0	36	5
Östers IF	2020	Superettan	29	4	1	0	—		30	4
Östers IF	2021	Superettan	13	0	0	0	—		13	0
Östers IF	Total		100	16	9	0	2	0	111	16
VVV-Venlo	2021–22	Eerste Divisie	30	2	0	0	—		30	2
VVV-Venlo	2022–23	Eerste Divisie	27	1	2	0	4 (Note: Appearances in Eredivisie promotion/relegation playoffs)	0	33	1
VVV-Venlo	Total		57	3	2	0	4	0	63	3
Career total			181	20	15	1	6	0	202	21
