= Herten, Netherlands =

Herten, Roermond
- Village
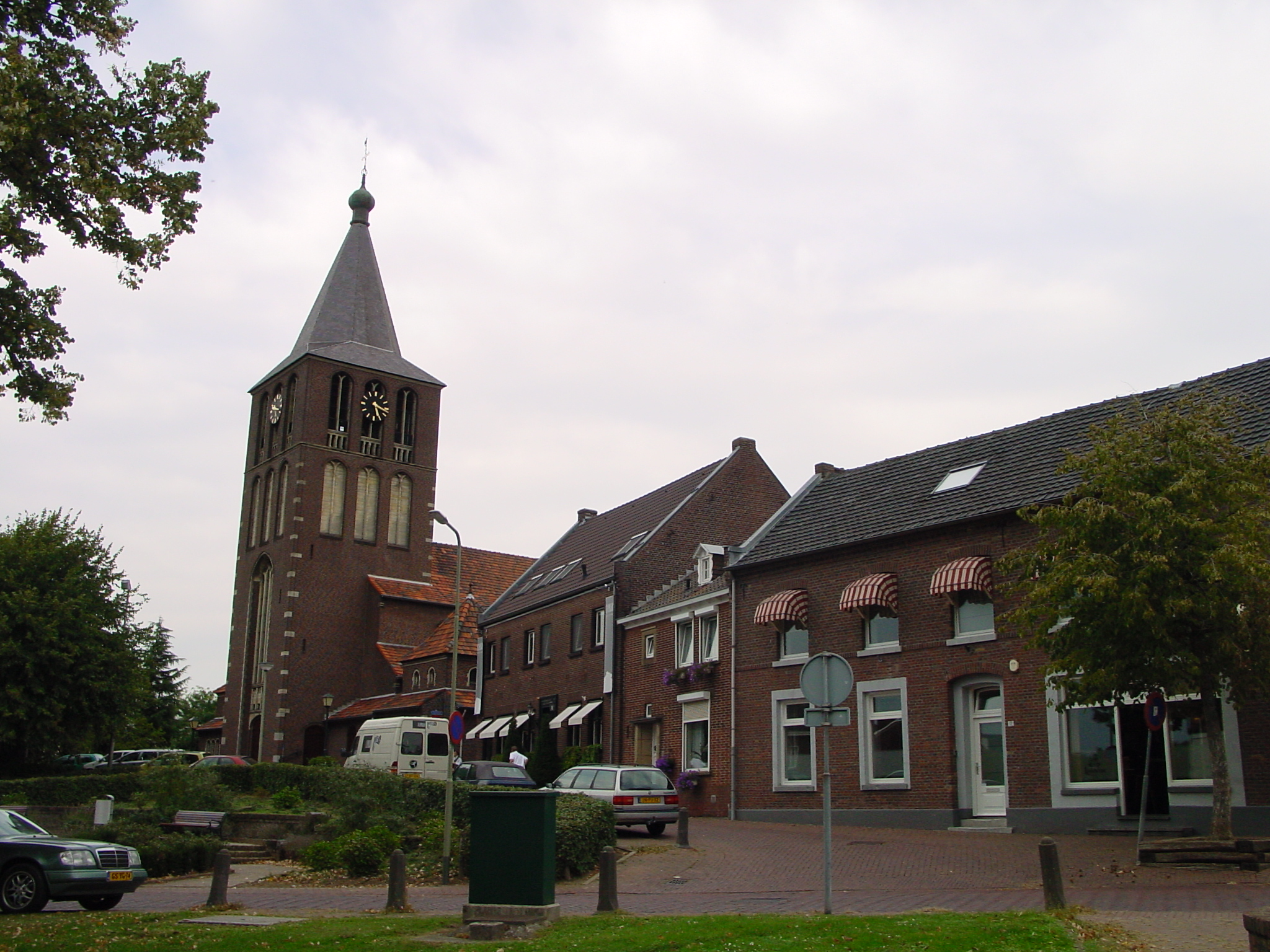
- The centre of Herten, with the church of St. Michaël

- Flag Coat of arms

- Location in the Netherlands Location in the province of Limburg in the Netherlands
- Coordinates: 51°11′N 5°58′E
- Country: Netherlands
- Province: Limburg
- Municipality: Roermond

Area
  - Total: 1.11 km^{2} (0.43 sq mi)
- Elevation: 22 m (72 ft)

Population (2021)
  - Total: 3,350
  - Density: 3,020/km^{2} (7,820/sq mi)
- Time zone: UTC+1 (CET)
  - Summer (DST): UTC+2 (CEST)
- Postal code: 6049
- Dialing code: 0475

Herten is a village in the southeastern Netherlands. It is located in the municipality of Roermond, Limburg.

== History ==
The village was first mentioned in the middle of the 11th century as Hercena. The etymology is unknown. Herten developed in the Middle Ages along the Maas. In 1716, it became part of the Austrian Upper Guelders.

The Catholic St Michael Church was originally from the 13th century. In 1881, the tower collapsed and a new church was built in Gothic Revival style. The church was completely destroyed in 1945, and a new church was built between 1953 and 1954 and was designed by Hendrik Willem Valk.

Herten was home to 153 people in 1840. It was severely damaged during World War II. After the war, it became a commuter's village for Roermond. Herten was a separate municipality until 1991, when it was merged with Roermond. The municipality also covered the smaller villages of Merum and Ool. Even though Roermond and Herten have formed a single urban area, Herten is a separate village.

== Gallery ==
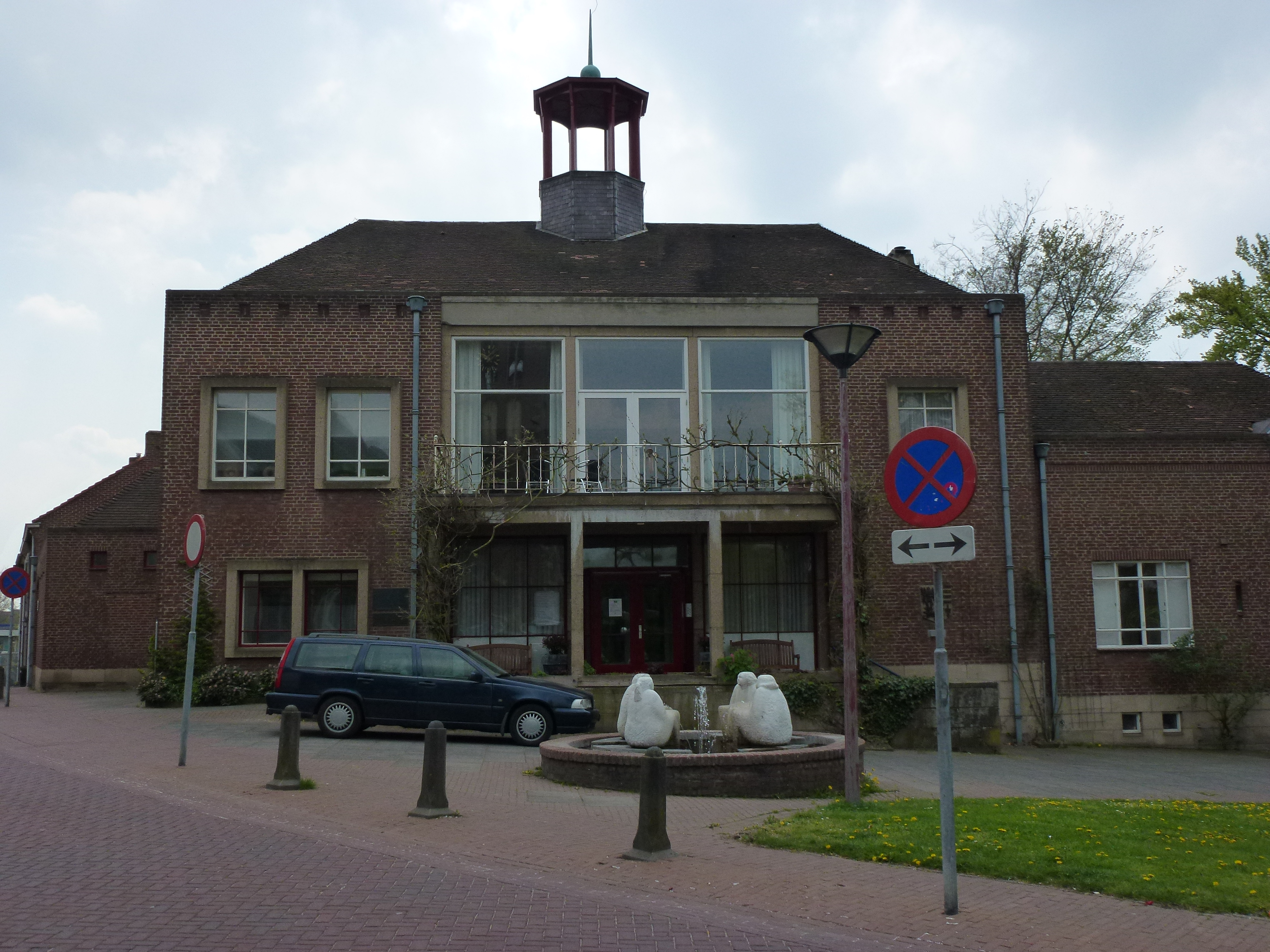
Former town hall
