= Guus Hupperts =

Dutch footballer (born 1992)

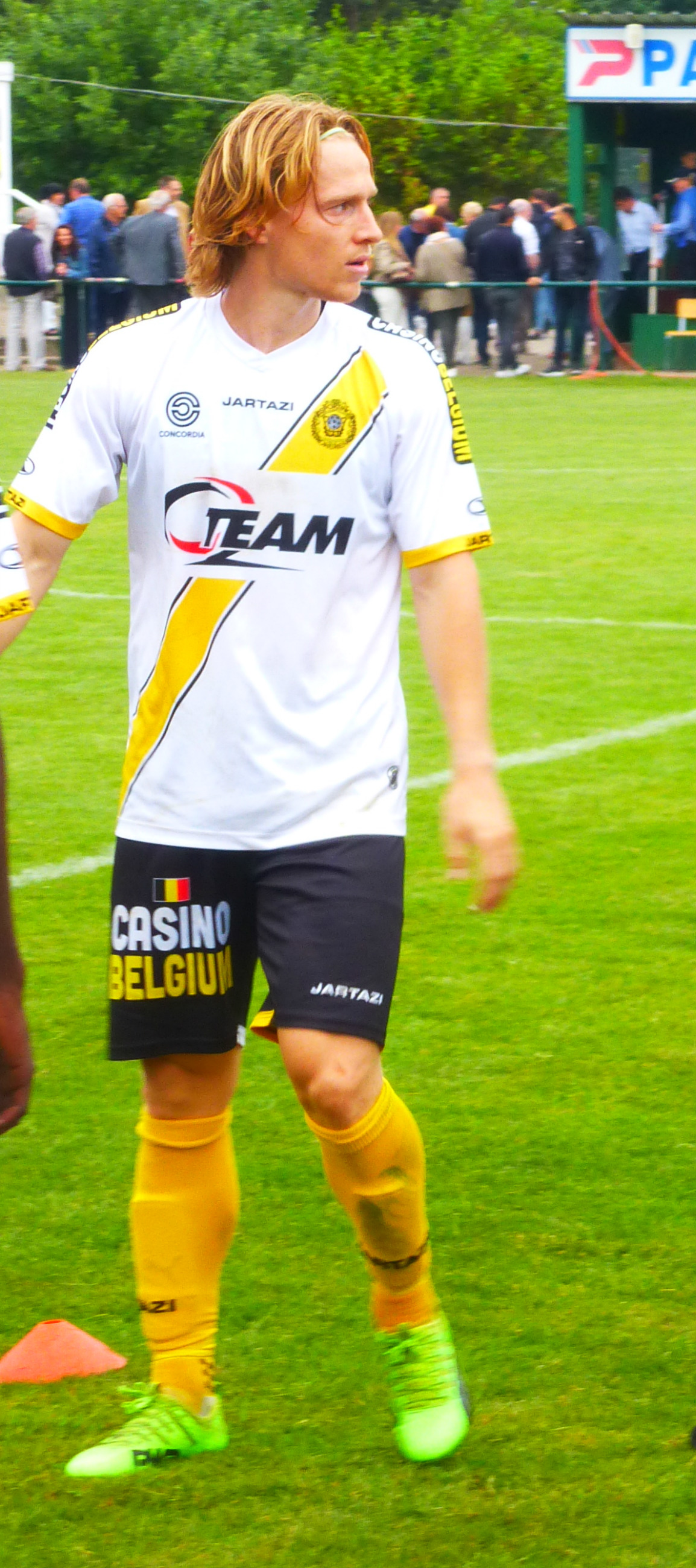
- Hupperts playing for Sporting Lokeren in 2017

Personal information
- Full name: Guus Bernd Hupperts
- Date of birth: 25 April 1992 (age 34)
- Place of birth: Heerlen, Netherlands
- Height: 1.76 m (5 ft 9 1/2 in)
- Position: Winger

Team information
- Current team: Roda JC (academy coach)

Youth career
- 1997-2000: FC Gulpen
- 2000-2010: Roda JC

Senior career*
Years	Team	Apps	(Gls)
2010–2014	Roda JC	75	(13)
2014–2016	AZ	41	(3)
2016	→ Willem II (loan)	13	(0)
2016–2020	Lokeren	75	(11)
2020–2021	VVV	15	(1)
2022	Groene Ster	17	(2)
2023	Diest	12	(5)
2023–2024	Turkse Rangers		
2024	Schaesberg		
Total		248	(35)

International career
2013	Netherlands U20	1	(0)
2013–2014	Netherlands U21	7	(0)

Managerial career
- 2025–: Roda JC (academy coach)
- * Club domestic league appearances and goals as of 17 December 2021

Guus Hupperts (born 25 April 1992) is a Dutch retired footballer. Born in Heerlen but raised in Gulpen, he formerly played for Roda JC Kerkrade, AZ, Willem II, Sporting Lokeren and VVV-Venlo.

== Career ==
Following the winter break, Hupperts joined Groene Ster for training and was officially included in their squad for the 2022–23 season. He departed after just half a season, moving back to Belgium to sign a contract with KFC Diest until the end of the season. After another half-season stint, he left Diest alongside teammate Jordie Briels to join Turkse Rangers, a club that also featured former Roda JC Kerkrade teammate Aleksandar Stankov. [12]

In 2024, Hupperts briefly joined amateur club VV Schaesberg, but retired after only one competitive match, citing his desire to prioritise his football school over a role as a substitute.

Hupperts played 7 games for the Netherlands national under-21 football team and 1 for the U20s.

Towards the end of his playing career, Hupperts opened his own football academy, 'Guus Hupperts Voetbalacademie', and later, presumably in 2025, also became part of the academy staff at his former club, Roda JC Kerkrade.
