= Joeri Schroyen =

Dutch footballer (born 1991)

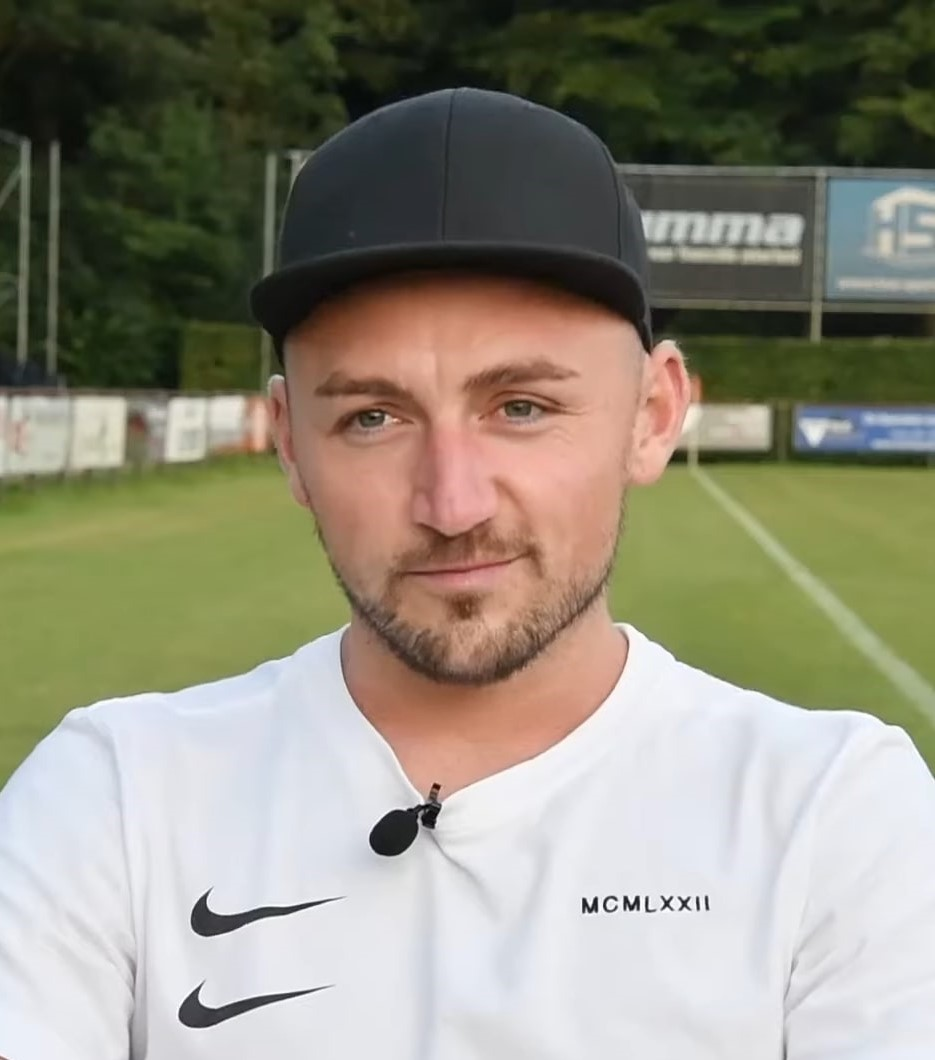
- Schroyen in 2021

Personal information
- Full name: Joeri Johannes Schroijen
- Date of birth: 18 January 1991 (age 35)
- Place of birth: Weert, Netherlands
- Height: 1.77 m (5 ft 10 in)
- Position: Left winger

Team information
- Current team: Wezel Sport
- Number: 11

Youth career
- –2001: RKSV Merefeldia
- 2001–2006: PSV
- 2006–2010: Eindhoven

Senior career*
Years	Team	Apps	(Gls)
2010–2013	Fortuna Sittard	70	(4)
2013–2014	Go Ahead Eagles	4	(0)
2014	→ VVV-Venlo	14	(1)
2014–2015	VVV-Venlo	8	(0)
2015	→ Fortuna Sittard (loan)	17	(2)
2015–2016	Fortuna Sittard	35	(4)
2016–2021	MVV	159	(40)
2021–2021	Xanthi	18	(2)
2021–2022	VVV-Venlo	34	(3)
2022–2023	Willem II	18	(1)
2023–2024	Helmond Sport	31	(2)
2024–	Wezel Sport	24	(1)
- * Club domestic league appearances and goals as of 10:58, 23 March 2025 (UTC)

Joeri Johannes Schroijen (born 18 January 1991), anglicised to Schroyen, is a Dutch professional footballer who plays as a left winger for Wezel Sport.

== Career ==
Schroyen took his first steps in professional football in the PSV youth academy. After a few seasons he moved to FC Eindhoven. He then joined Fortuna Sittard, where he also made his senior debut. That was on 24 September 2010, when the Limburgish team lost 2–1 at home to FC Volendam. Schroyen made an appearance as a starter. A left back during his early career, he scored his first goal on 30 October 2010, at home against Veendam. The following season he scored once again, this time against FC Den Bosch. On 16 November 2012, Schroyen made his 50th appearance for Fortuna, at home against Sparta Rotterdam (3–1 loss).

On 3 June 2013, Schroyen signed a contract with the recently promoted Eredivisie club Go Ahead Eagles for two years, with an option for a third year. However, he was mostly a reserve on the team. In January 2014, he was signed on a one-and-a-half-year contract by VVV-Venlo, of which the first six months were on a loan. On 24 January 2014, he made his debut for the Venlo club; when they won 1–0 away against Willem II. Schroyen came on as a substitute for Randy Wolters in the second half. In January 2015, Schroyen returned to Fortuna in a trade deal with Ramon Voorn, who had a disagreement with head coach Peter van Vossen.

Schroyen made signed with MVV Maastricht as a free agent in the summer of 2016. There, he signed a two-year contract extension in June 2019.

On 2 February 2021, Schroyen signed with Greek club Xanthi on a one-and-a-half-year deal.

He returned to VVV-Venlo in July 2021 on a two-year contract, with an option of an additional year. The following year, on 7 July 2022, Schroyen joined Willem II.

On 1 September 2023, Schroyen moved to Helmond Sport. He left the club at the end of the season.
