= Stan van Dijck =

Dutch footballer

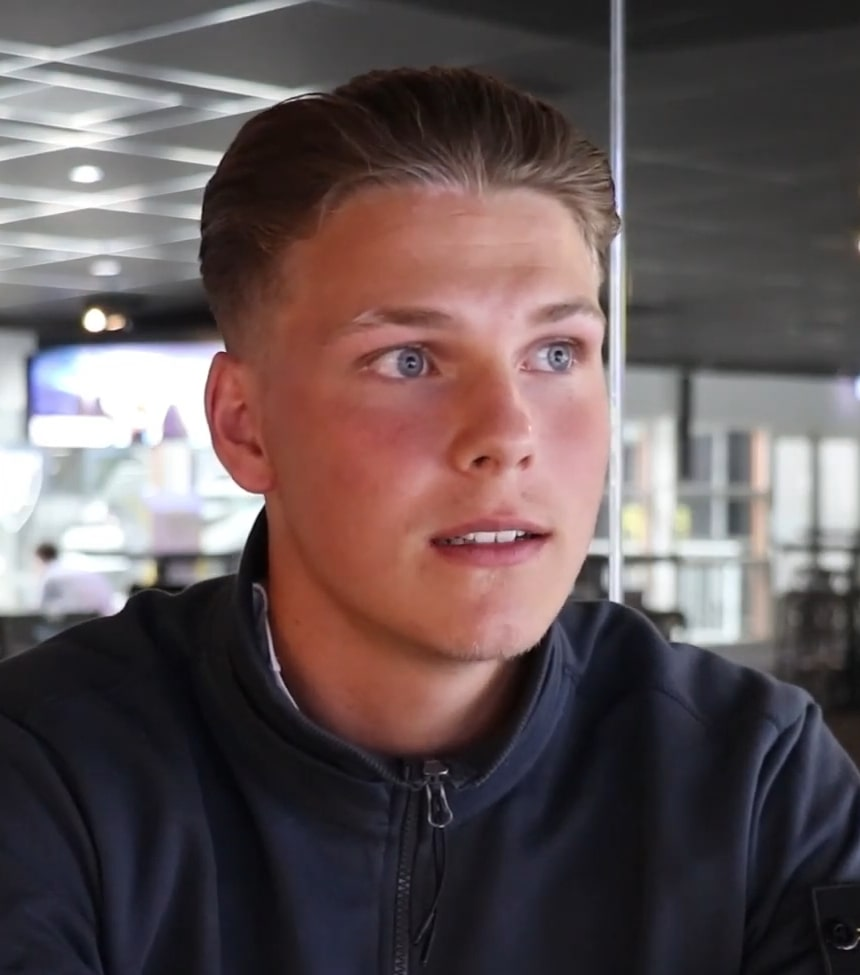
- Van Dijck in 2020

Personal information
- Date of birth: 7 October 2000 (age 26)
- Place of birth: Boxmeer, Netherlands
- Height: 1.95 m (6 ft 5 in)
- Position: Centre-back

Team information
- Current team: Blauw Geel '38

Youth career
- –2014: Venray
- 2014–2015: Fortuna Sittard
- 2015–2016: Venray
- 2016–2019: VVV

Senior career*
Years	Team	Apps	(Gls)
2019–2022	VVV	35	(0)
2021	→ Roda JC (loan)	7	(0)
2022–2024	Phönix Lübeck	23	(0)
2024–2025	Blau-Weiß Lohne	7	(0)
2025	Hebar	4	(0)
2026-	Blauw Geel '38		
- * Club domestic league appearances and goals as of 1 January 2026

Stan van Dijck (born 7 October 2000) is a Dutch professional footballer who plays as a centre-back for Derde Divisie side Blauw Geel '38.

== Professional career ==
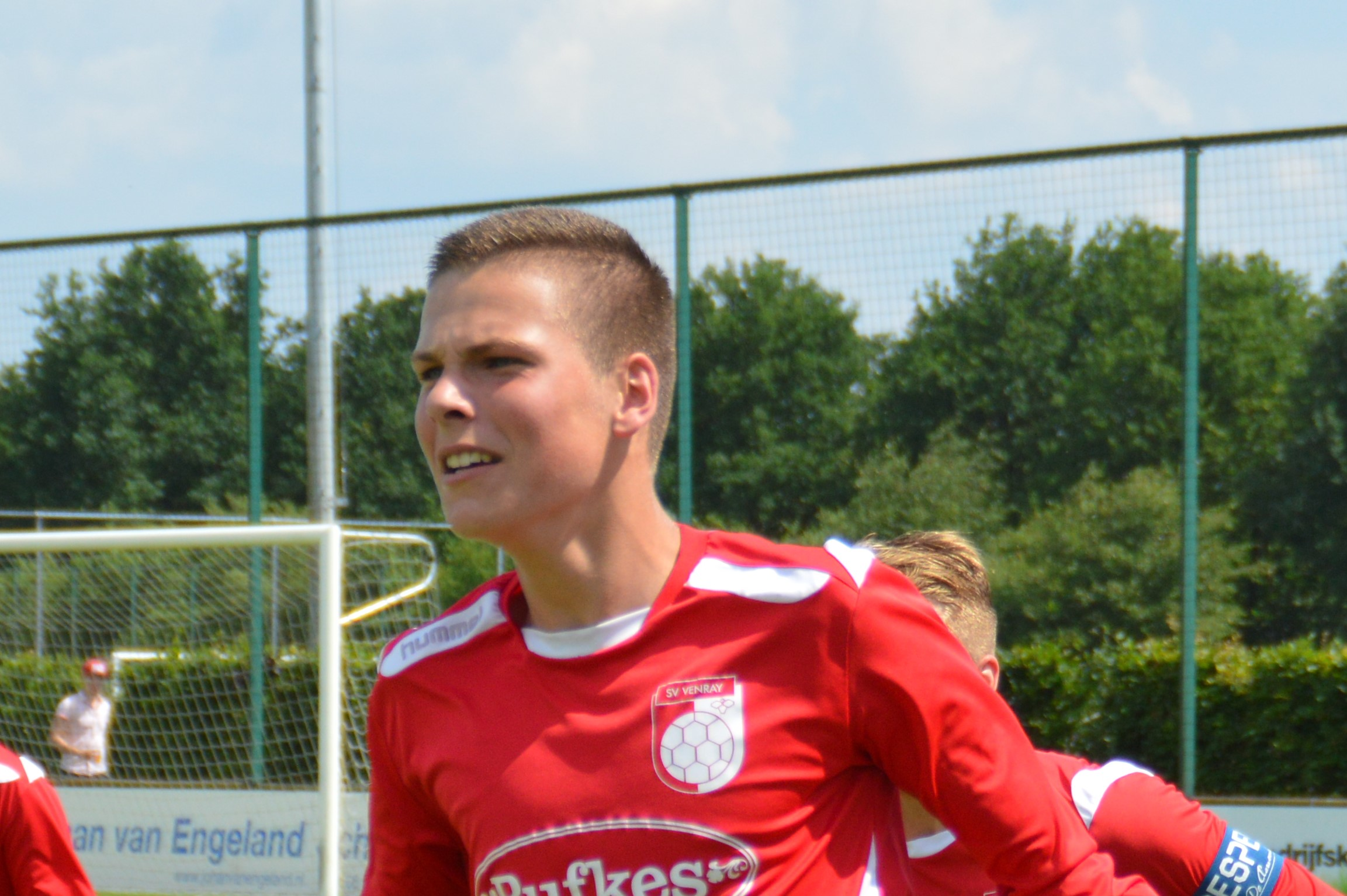
Van Dijck with SV Venray in 2016

Van Dijck made his professional debut with VVV-Venlo in a 2-1 Eredivisie loss to PEC Zwolle on 14 December 2019.

On 13 January 2021, Van Dijck van sent on loan for the remainder of the season to Roda JC Kerkrade.

In March 2022, VVV announced that they would not extend his contract, making him a free agent ahead of the 2022–23 season.

On 22 July 2022, van Dijck joined Phönix Lübeck in German fourth-tier Regionalliga Nord. After a spell in Bulgaria, he returned to Holland to play for amateur side Blauw Geel '38 in January 2026.
