= 2020–21 VVV-Venlo season =

VVV-Venlo
2020–21 season
- Chairman: Ineke Gutterswijk-Luiten
- Head coach: Hans de Koning
- Stadium: Seacon Stadion – De Koel –
- 2020–21 Eredivisie: 17th (relegated)
- KNVB Cup: Semi-finals
- Top goalscorer: League: Giorgos Giakoumakis (26 goals); All: Giorgos Giakoumakis (29 goals)
- Highest home attendance: 1,435 (2nd week)
- Lowest home attendance: 0
- Average home league attendance: 76
- Biggest win: 4-1 ADO Den Haag (a) 16th week SBV Vitesse (h) 19th week
- Biggest defeat: 6-0 Feyenoord (a) 25th week
Home colours	Away colours
- All statistics correct as of 22 August 2026.

The 2020–21 season marked the 118th year of VVV-Venlo's existence. It was also the club's 24th season in the Eredivisie and their fourth consecutive season in the top division of Dutch football.

VVV-Venlo also took part in the KNVB Cup, enjoying a run to the semi-finals before being knocked out by SBV Vitesse following a 2–0 defeat.

Giorgos Giakoumakis was the club's top goalscorer during the season, scoring 29 goals in all competitions. He scored 26 times in the Eredivisie and added 3 goals in the KNVB Cup.

Danny Post and Vito van Crooij shared the record for the most appearances for VVV-Venlo during the campaign, with both players featuring 35 times in all competitions. Danny Post made 31 appearances in the Eredivisie and 4 in the KNVB Cup, while Vito van Crooij played 30 league matches and 5 cup matches.

== Players ==
=== First-team squad ===
Note: Flags indicate national team as defined under FIFA eligibility rules; some limited exceptions apply. Players may hold more than one non-FIFA nationality.

No.	Pos.	Nation	Player
1	GK	GER	Thorsten Kirschbaum
2	DF	GER	Tobias Pachonik
3	DF	NED	Arjan Swinkels
4	DF	SUI	Roy Gelmi
5	DF	GER	Steffen Schäfer
6	MF	NED	Danny Post (captain)
7	FW	NED	Guus Hupperts
8	MF	FRA	Zinédine Machach
9	MF	CRO	Ante Ćorić
10	FW	NED	Vito van Crooij
11	FW	GRE	Giorgos Giakoumakis
12	FW	ARU	Joshua John
14	DF	NED	Christian Kum
15	DF	NED	Simon Janssen
16	GK	NED	Delano van Crooij

No.	Pos.	Nation	Player
17	DF	NED	Tristan Dekker
18	MF	GRE	Christos Donis
18	DF	NED	Stan van Dijck
19	FW	NED	Yahcuroo Roemer
20	MF	NED	Aaron Bastiaans
20	FW	CUW	Jafar Arias
21	FW	GRE	Anastasios Donis
24	MF	NED	Wassim Essanoussi
25	DF	GAM	Leon Guwara
26	MF	GER	Lukas Schmitz
27	FW	NED	Torino Hunte
29	MF	NED	Evert Linthorst
37	MF	GER	Meritan Shabani
44	DF	CPV	Kristopher Da Graca

== Transfers ==
=== In ===
Pos.	Player	Transferred from	Fee	Date
FW	(Netherlands) Guus Hupperts	(Belgium) KSC Lokeren Oost-Vlaanderen	Free	1 July 2020
FW	(Curaçao) Jafar Arias	(Netherlands) FC Emmen	Free	1 July 2020
FW	(Netherlands) Arjan Swinkels	(Belgium) KV Mechelen	Free	13 July 2020
DF	(Germany) Lukas Schmitz	(Germany) Wolfsberger AC	Free	1 August 2020
FW	(Greece) Georgios Giakoumakis	(Greece) AEK Athens F.C.	€450,000	11 August 2020
FW	(Netherlands) Vito van Crooij	(Netherlands) PEC Zwolle		25 August 2020
FW	(Aruba) Joshua John	No club		4 September 2020
MF	(Morocco) Zinédine Machach	(Italy) SSC Napoli	On loan	1 October 2020
MF	(Croatia) Ante Ćorić	(Italy) AS Roma	On loan	2 October 2020
FW	(Netherlands) Torino Hunte	No club		15 October 2020
DF	(Cape Verde) Kristopher da Graça	(Sweden) IFK Göteborg	€160,000	6 January 2021
DF	(The Gambia) Leon Guwara	(Netherlands) FC Utrecht	On loan	7 January 2021
MF	(Greece) Christos Donis	(Italy) Ascoli Calcio 1898 FC	On loan	21 January 2021
FW	(Greece) Anastasios Donis	(France) Stade de Reims	On loan	1 February 2021
MF	(Germany) Meritan Shabani	(England) Wolverhampton Wanderers F.C. U23	On loan	1 February 2021

=== Out ===
Pos.	Player	Transferred to	Fee	Date
FW	(England) Jerome Sinclair	(England) Watford F.C.	On loan	30 June 2020
FW	(Ecuador) John Yeboah	(Germany) VfL Wolfsburg	End of loan	30 June 2020
FW	(Algeria) Oussama Darfalou	(Netherlands) SBV Vitesse	End of loan	30 June 2020
MF	(Netherlands) Thomas Bruns	(Netherlands) SBV Vitesse	End of loan	30 June 2020
DF	(Germany) Nils Röseler	(Germany) SV Sandhausen	Free	1 July 2020
DF	(Netherlands) Roel Janssen	(Netherlands) Fortuna Sittard	Free	1 July 2020
FW	(Netherlands) Peter van Ooijen	(Germany) KFC Uerdingen 05	Free	1 August 2020
FW	(United States) Haji Wright	(Denmark) Sønderjyske Fodbold	Free	2 August 2020
MF	(Netherlands) Johnatan Opoku	(Netherlands) De Graafschap	Free	12 August 2020
MF	(England) Lee Cattermole	End of career		14 August 2020
MF	(Germany) Richard Neudecker	(Germany) TSV 1860 Munich		3 September 2020
MF	(Netherlands) Evert Linthorst	(United Arab Emirates) Kalba FC	€600,000	1 February 2021
MF	(Croatia) Ante Ćorić	(Italy) AS Roma	End of loan	14 February 2021

== Pre-season and friendlies ==
Win Draw Loss Fixtures

26 July 2020 Friendly	EVV (Netherlands)	0–2	(Netherlands) VVV-Venlo	Echt-Susteren, Netherlands
12:00 CEST (UTC+2)		Report	Hendrikx 38', 68' (pen.)	Stadium: Sportpark In de Bandert

14 August 2020 Friendly	Willem II (Netherlands)	2–1	(Netherlands) VVV-Venlo	Tilburg, Netherlands
18:45 CEST (UTC+2)	Wriedt 55'; Ndayishimiye 65' (pen.)	Report	Linthorst 10'	Stadium: Koning Willem II Stadion; Attendance: 2,800

21 August 2020 Friendly	Jong PSV (Netherlands)	Cancelled	(Netherlands) VVV-Venlo	Eindhoven, Netherlands
14:00 CEST (UTC+2)		Report		Stadium: De Herdgang

26 August 2020 Friendly	Fortuna Sittard (Netherlands)	2–1	(Netherlands) VVV-Venlo	Sittard, Netherlands
14:10 CEST (UTC+2)	Polter 32'; Rota 38'	Report	Van Crooij 36'	Stadium: Fortuna Sittard Stadion

4 September 2020 Friendly	VVV-Venlo (Netherlands)	0–4	(Germany) Borussia Mönchengladbach	Venlo, Netherlands
19:00 CEST (UTC+2)			Stindl 8'; Bensebaini 37' (pen.); Müsel 47'; Herrmann 56'	Stadium: De Koel; Attendance: 1,500; Referee: Erwin Blank

== Competitions ==
=== Overview ===
Competition	First match	Last match	Starting round	Final position	Record							
Competition	First match	Last match	Starting round	Final position	Pld	W	D	L	GF	GA	GD	Win %
Eredivisie	13 September 2020	16 May 2021	Matchday 1	17th	34	6	5	23	43	91	−48	17.65
KNVB Cup	27 October 2020	2 March 2021	First round	Semi-finals	5	4	0	1	11	6	+5	80.00
Total					39	10	5	24	54	97	−43	25.64

Last updated: 16 May 2021
Source: Soccerway

=== Eredivisie ===
==== League table ====
Pos	Team	Pld	W	D	L	GF	GA	GD	Pts	Qualification or relegation
14	Willem II	34	8	7	19	40	68	−28	31	
15	RKC Waalwijk	34	7	9	18	33	55	−22	30	
16	Emmen (R)	34	7	9	18	40	68	−28	30	Qualification for the Relegation play-offs (Note: Seven teams, one from the Eredivisie and six from the Eerste Divisie, play for one spot in the 2021–22 Eredivisie. The remaining six teams play in the 2021–22 Eerste Divisie.)
17	VVV-Venlo (R)	34	6	5	23	43	91	−48	23	Relegation to Eerste Divisie
18	ADO Den Haag (R)	34	4	10	20	29	76	−47	22	Relegation to Eerste Divisie

Source: Eredivisie, Soccerway
Rules for classification: Season in progress: 1) Most points won; 2) Less points lost; 3) Goal difference; 4) Goals scored; 5) Alphabetical order; End of season: 1) Points; 2) Goal difference; 3) Goals scored; 4) Head-to-head points; 5) Head-to-head goal difference; 6) Head-to-head away goals scored; 7) Play-off if relevant for deciding champion, relegation or participating in a European league, otherwise by draw. 8) Penalty shoot-out (only after a play-off)
(R) Relegated

==== Results summary ====
Overall								Home						Away					
Pld	W	D	L	GF	GA	GD	Pts	W	D	L	GF	GA	GD	W	D	L	GF	GA	GD
34	6	5	23	43	91	−48	23	3	4	10	20	46	−26	3	1	13	23	45	−22

Last updated: 16 May 2021.
Source: Eredivisie

==== Results by round ====
Round	1	2	3	4	5	6	7	8	9	10	11	12	13	14	15	16	17	18	19	20	21	22	23	24	25	26	27	28	29	30	31	32	33	34
Ground	A	H	A	H	A	H	A	H	A	H	A	H	H	A	H	A	H	A	H	A	H	A	H	A	A	H	A	H	H	A	A	H	A	H
Result	W	D	L	L	D	L	L	W	L	D	L	L	L	L	W	W	D	W	W	L	L	L	L	L	L	L	L	L	L	L	L	D	L	L
Position	1	5	10	11	10	14	14	11	14	13	14	14	15	16	15	14	14	14	13	14	14	14	14	15	15	15	16	16	16	17	17	17	17	17

Updated to match(es) played on 16 May 2021. Source: Eredivisie
A = Away; H = Home; W = Win; D = Draw; L = Loss

=== Matches ===
The league fixtures were announced on 24 July 2020.

==== 1st half ====
13 September 2020 1st week	FC Emmen	3–5	VVV-Venlo	Emmen
12:15	De Vos 4'; Kolar 49' (yellow card) 86'; Chacón (yellow card) 64'; Laursen 76'	Report	Hupperts (yellow card) 20'; Post (yellow card) 39'; Giakoumakis 50' 65' (pen.) 72'; Kum (yellow card) 67'; Cavlan 90' (o.g.); Arias 90+4'	Stadium: De Oude Meerdijk; Attendance: 2,400; Referee: Siemen Mulder

18 September 2020 2nd week	VVV-Venlo	1–1	FC Utrecht	Venlo
20:00	Hupperts 8'; Post (yellow card) 38'; Van Crooij (yellow card) 77'	Report	Klaiber 58'; Elia (yellow card) 90+4'	Stadium: Seacon Stadion – De Koel – Attendance: 1,435; Referee: Rob Dieperink

26 September 2020 3rd week	SC Heerenveen	1–0	VVV-Venlo	Heerenveen
20:00	J. Veerman 32' (pen.); Floranus (yellow card) 57'	Report	Van Crooij (yellow card) 62'; Pachonik (red card) 63'; Janssen (red card) 79'	Stadium: Abe Lenstra Stadion; Attendance: 6,500; Referee: Kevin Blom

3 October 2020 4th week	VVV-Venlo	1–2	ADO Den Haag	Venlo
20:00	Gelmi (yellow card) 3'; Giakoumakis 4'; Linthorst (yellow card) 52'	Report	Pinas 3' (pen.); Van Ewijk (yellow card) 53'; Philipp 90+3'	Stadium: Seacon Stadion – De Koel – Attendance: 0 Referee: Bas Nijhuis

17 October 2020 5th week	AZ	2–2	VVV-Venlo	Alkmaar
20:00	Karlsson 2'; Stengs 24'; Svensson (red card) 41'; De Wit (yellow card) 78'	Report	Machach (yellow card) 19'; Gelmi (yellow card) 30'; Hunte (yellow card) 46'; Linthorst 86'; Giakoumakis 88'	Stadium: AFAS Stadion; Attendance: 0 Referee: Christiaan Bax

24 October 2020 6th week	VVV-Venlo	0–13	Ajax	Venlo
16:30	Post (yellow card) 18'; Kum (red card) 52'	Report	Ekkelenkamp 12' 57'; Traoré 17' 32' 54' 65' 87'; Tadić 45'; Antony 55'; Blind 59'; Huntelaar 74' (pen.) 76'; Martínez 79'	Stadium: Seacon Stadion – De Koel – Attendance: 0 Referee: Danny Makkelie

31 October 2020 7th week	FC Groningen	2–1	VVV-Venlo	Groningen
20:00	Joosten 26'; Strand Larsen 48'; Gudmundsson (yellow card) 88'	Report	Giakoumakis 90+5'	Stadium: Hitachi Capital Mobility Stadion; Attendance: 0 Referee: Allard Lindhout

7 November 2020 8th week	VVV-Venlo	3–2	Heracles Almelo	Venlo
18:45	Post (yellow card) 31'; Van Crooij (yellow card) 37' (goal) 67'; Arias 51'; Giakoumakis 88'	Report	Van der Water 38'; Szőke (red card) 47'; Vloet 78'	Stadium: Seacon Stadion – De Koel – Attendance: 0 Referee: Richard Martens

21 November 2020 9th week	Willem II Tilburg	2–1	VVV-Venlo	Tilburg
18:45	Pavlidis 7'; Sağlam 18'; Llonch (yellow card) 62'; Ndayishimiye (yellow card) 86'	Report	Giakoumakis 34'; Hunte (yellow card) 73'	Stadium: Koning Willem II Stadion; Attendance: 0 Referee: Erwin Blank

28 November 2020 10th week	VVV-Venlo	2–2	PEC Zwolle	Venlo
21:00	Arias 21'; Giakoumakis 78'	Report	Nakayama (yellow card) 9'; Pherai 36'; Van Duinen 69'; Lam (red card) 90+3'	Stadium: Seacon Stadion – De Koel – Attendance: 0 Referee: Rob Dieperink

5 December 2020 11th week	RKC Waalwijk	3–2	VVV-Venlo	Waalwijk
16:30	Stokkers 30'; Bakari (yellow card) 52'; Anita (yellow card) 59'; Touba (yellow card) 69' (goal) 75'; Daneels 87'	Report	Gelmi (yellow card) 26' (yellow-red card) 55'; Post (yellow card) 28'; Giakoumakis 35' (pen.); Van Crooij 51'; Machach (yellow card) 90+5'	Stadium: Mandemakers Stadion; Attendance: 0 Referee: Edwin van de Graaf

13 December 2020 12th week	VVV-Venlo	0–3	Feyenoord	Venlo
14:30		Report	Toornstra 69' 77'; Berghuis 73'	Stadium: Seacon Stadion – De Koel – Attendance: 0 Referee: Björn Kuipers

19 December 2020 13th week	VVV-Venlo	1–2	FC Twente	Venlo
18:45	Linthorst 70'; Schmitz (yellow card) 75'; Van Crooij (yellow card) 78'	Report	Danilo 27' (yellow card) 85'; Ilić (yellow card) 40' (goal) 63'	Stadium: Seacon Stadion – De Koel – Attendance: 0 Referee: Serdar Gözübüyük

22 December 2020 14th week	PSV	4–1	VVV-Venlo	Eindhoven
20:00	Max 35' (pen.); Boscagli 49'; Gakpo 58'; Fein 90+2'	Report	Arias 22'	Stadium: Philips Stadion; Attendance: 0 Referee: Sander van der Eijk

==== 2nd half ====
10 January 2021 15th week	VVV-Venlo	2–1	Willem II Tilburg	Venlo
14:30	Giakoumakis 79' (pen.) 90+3' (yellow card) 87'	Report	Van der Heijden 15' (yellow card) 52'; Holmén (yellow card) 66'	Stadium: Seacon Stadion – De Koel – Attendance: 0 Referee: Jochem Kamphuis

13 January 2021 16th week	ADO Den Haag	1–4	VVV-Venlo	The Hague
20:00	Pinas (yellow card) 5'; Kemper (yellow card) 44'; Bourard 65'; Castillo (yellow card) 67'	Report	Giakoumakis 6' (pen.) 58' 68' 86' (pen.); John (yellow card) 35'; Van Crooij (yellow card) 42'; Dekker (yellow card) 66'	Stadium: Cars Jeans Stadion; Attendance: 0 Referee: Jannick van der Laan

17 January 2021 17th week	VVV-Venlo	1–1	SC Heerenveen	Venlo
14:30	Post (yellow card) 46'; John 78'; Da Graca (yellow card) 90+3'	Report	J. Veerman (yellow card) 17'; Nygren 89'	Stadium: Seacon Stadion – De Koel – Attendance: 0 Referee: Erwin Blank

24 January 2021 18th week	FC Twente	0–1	VVV-Venlo	Enschede
14:30	Zerrouki (yellow card) 43'; Danilo (yellow card) 77'	Report	Van Crooij (yellow card) 69'; Hunte 78'	Stadium: De Grolsch Veste; Attendance: 0 Referee: Martin van den Kerkhof

27 January 2021 19th week	VVV-Venlo	4–1	Vitesse	Venlo
20:00	Giakoumakis 16' 28' 43' 79'	Report	Broja 60' (yellow card) 62'	Stadium: Seacon Stadion – De Koel – Attendance: 0 Referee: Allard Lindhout

30 January 2021 20th week	Fortuna Sittard	3–2	VVV-Venlo	Sittard
20:00	Angha (yellow card) 25'; Flemming 33'; Seuntjens 58' (pen.); Janssen (yellow card) 67'; Rienstra 90'	Report	Kirschbaum (yellow card) 33'; Giakoumakis (yellow card) 45+1' (goal) 63'; Da Graca (yellow card) 56'; Hunte 90+2'	Stadium: Fortuna Sittard Stadion; Attendance: 0 Referee: Serdar Gözübüyük

14 February 2021 22nd week	FC Utrecht	3–1	VVV-Venlo	Utrecht
14:30	Maher (penalty missed) 32'; Mahi 61' 90+5'; Ramselaar 85'	Report	Giakoumakis 90+1' (pen.)	Stadium: Stadion Galgenwaard; Attendance: 0 Referee: Marc Nagtegaal

20 February 2021 23rd week	VVV-Venlo	1–4	AZ	Venlo
20:00	Donis 24'; Kum (red card) 58'	Report	Karlsson 15'; Wijndal (yellow card) 23'; Evjen 56'; Boadu 64' 85'	Stadium: Seacon Stadion – De Koel – Attendance: 0 Referee: Jochem Kamphuis

27 February 2021 24th week	Vitesse	4–1	VVV-Venlo	Arnhem
20:00	Openda 3'; Bazoer 57'; Tronstad 75'; Broja 82'	Report	Giakoumakis 19' (pen.)	Stadium: GelreDome; Attendance: 0 Referee: Erwin Blank

6 March 2021 25th week	Feyenoord	6–0	VVV-Venlo	Rotterdam
16:30	Toornstra 14' 62'; Geertruida 19'; Linssen 31'; Berghuis 73'; Botteghin 85'	Report		Stadium: De Kuip; Attendance: 0 Referee: Edwin van de Graaf

9 March 2021 21st week	VVV-Venlo	0–1	Sparta Rotterdam	Venlo
18:45		Report	Duarte (yellow card) 65'; Da Graca 70' (o.g.)	Stadium: Seacon Stadion – De Koel – Attendance: 0 Referee: Christiaan Bax

14 March 2021 26th week	VVV-Venlo	1–3	Fortuna Sittard	Venlo
12:15	Giakoumakis (yellow card) 46' (goal) 54'; Post (yellow card) 78'; Arias (yellow card) 90+2'	Report	Semedo 10'; Seuntjens 59' (yellow card) 89'; Flemming 66'	Stadium: Seacon Stadion – De Koel – Attendance: 0 Referee: Siemen Mulder

21 March 2021 27th week	PEC Zwolle	2–1	VVV-Venlo	Zwolle
12:15	Lam (yellow card) 51' (goal) 79' (pen.); Tedić 66'	Report	Gelmi 69'; Giakoumakis (yellow card) 90+3'	Stadium: MAC³PARK Stadion; Attendance: 0 Referee: Ingmar Oostrom

3 April 2021 28th week	VVV-Venlo	0–1	FC Groningen	Venlo
18:45		Report	Matusiwa (yellow card) 7' (yellow-red card) 20'; El Hankouri 87'; Da Cruz (yellow card) 89'	Stadium: Seacon Stadion – De Koel – Attendance: 0 Referee: Bas Nijhuis

11 April 2021 29th week	VVV-Venlo	0–2	PSV	Venlo
14:30	Giakoumakis (yellow card) 65'	Report	Gakpo 13'; Malen 59'	Stadium: Seacon Stadion – De Koel – Attendance: 0 Referee: Kevin Blom

24 April 2021 30th week	Sparta Rotterdam	2–0	VVV-Venlo	Rotterdam
18:45	Duarte 41'; Smeets (yellow card) 45' (goal) 67'; Beugelsdijk (yellow card) 76'	Report	Post (yellow card) 56'; Van Crooij (yellow card) 70'; Donis (yellow card) 77'; Machach (yellow card) 90'	Stadium: Het Kasteel; Attendance: 0 Referee: Sander van der Eijk

1 May 2021 31st week	Heracles Almelo	4–0	VVV-Venlo	Almelo
16:30	Bakış 35' 55' 83' (pen.); Vloet 44'; Knoester (yellow card) 49'	Report	Swinkels (yellow card) 82'	Stadium: Erve Asito; Attendance: 0 Referee: Björn Kuipers

8 May 2021 32nd week	VVV-Venlo	3–3	RKC Waalwijk	Venlo
21:00	Giakoumakis 3'; John 44'; Da Graca (yellow card) 59'; Van Crooij 79' (yellow card) 90+2'	Report	Oosting 14'; Sow (yellow card) 28'; Ngonge 33' 84' (pen.)	Stadium: Seacon Stadion – De Koel – Attendance: 0 Referee: Jochem Kamphuis

13 May 2021 33rd week	Ajax	3–1	VVV-Venlo	Amsterdam
14:30	Rensch 10'; Martínez (yellow card) 49'; Taylor (red card) 53'; Haller 57'; Kudus 77'	Report	Giakoumakis (yellow card) 44' (goal) 76'	Stadium: Johan Cruyff Arena; Attendance: 0 Referee: Dennis Higler

16 May 2021 34th week	VVV-Venlo	0–4	FC Emmen	Venlo
14:30	Pachonik (yellow card) 39'; Post (yellow card) 84'	Report	Bijl (yellow card) 24'; Adžić 36'; Peña 53' (pen.); Bernadou (yellow card) 61'; De Leeuw 64'; Gladon 81'	Stadium: Seacon Stadion – De Koel – Attendance: 0 Referee: Danny Makkelie

=== KNVB Cup ===
27 October 2020 First round	VVV-Venlo	4–2	Den Bosch	Venlo
19:45 CET (UTC+1)	Giakoumakis 57', 73' (pen.); Arias 60'; Pachonik 90'	Report	Postema 42', 81'; Mulders (yellow card) 51'	Stadium: De Koel; Attendance: 0 Referee: Laurens Gerrets

16 December 2020 Second round	Almere City	1–4	VVV-Venlo	Almere
16:30 CET (UTC+1)	Gelmi 10' (o.g.); Koolwijk (yellow card) 72'	Report	Van Crooij 33'; Arias 45+1', 70'; Linthorst 52'	Stadium: Yanmar Stadion; Attendance: 0 Referee: Bas Nijhuis

21 January 2021 Round of 16	VVV-Venlo	1–0	Go Ahead Eagles	Venlo
21:00 CET (UTC+1)	Bastiaans 35'; Post (yellow card) 62'	Report	Ross (yellow card) 10'; Mulenga (yellow card) 57'; Lucassen (yellow card) 85'; Botos (yellow card) 90+3'	Stadium: De Koel; Attendance: 0 Referee: Richard Martens

17 February 2021 Quarter-finals	NEC Nijmegen	1–2 (a.e.t.)	VVV-Venlo	Almelo
16:30 CET (UTC+1)	Janga 57'; Vet (yellow card) 81'; El Karouani (yellow card) 116'; Odenthal (yellow card) 119'	Report	Giakoumakis 23'; Swinkels (yellow card) 59'; Gelmi (yellow card) 103'; Shabani 105'	Stadium: Erve Asito; Attendance: 0 Referee: Jeroen Manschot
Note: The match was originally scheduled to be held on 10 February 2021, 18:45 CET, but was postponed due to the pitch being frozen.

2 March 2021 Semi-finals	Vitesse	2–0	VVV-Venlo	Arnhem
21:00 CET (UTC+1)	Tannane (yellow card) 63', (goal) 84'; Broja 75'	Report	Giakoumakis (yellow card) 26'	Stadium: GelreDome; Attendance: 0 Referee: Allard Lindhout

== Statistics ==
=== Scorers ===
#	Player	Eredivisie	KNVB	Total
1	(Germany) Giorgos Giakoumakis	26	3	29
2	(Curaçao) Jafar Arias	4	3	7
3	(Netherlands) Vito van Crooij	3	1	4
4	(Netherlands) Evert Linthorst	2	1	3
5	(Aruba) Joshua John	2	0	2
5	(Netherlands) Torino Hunte	2	0	2
7	(Greece) Christos Donis	1	0	1
7	(Netherlands) Guus Hupperts	1	0	1
7	(Switzerland) Roy Gelmi	1	0	1
7	(Netherlands) Aaron Bastiaans	0	1	1
7	(Germany) Meritan Shabani	0	1	1
7	(Germany) Tobias Pachonik	0	1	1

=== Appearances ===
#	Player	Eredivisie	KNVB	Total
1	(Netherlands) Vito van Crooij	31	4	35
1	(Netherlands) Danny Post	30	5	35
3	(Germany) Giorgos Giakoumakis	30	3	33
3	(Curaçao) Jafar Arias	29	4	33
5	(Germany) Tobias Pachonik	29	3	32
6	(Germany) Thorsten Kirschbaum	29	2	31
7	(Switzerland) Roy Gelmi	24	5	29
7	(France) Zinédine Machach	24	5	29
9	(Netherlands) Christian Kum	24	3	27
10	(Aruba) Joshua John	25	1	26
11	(Netherlands) Torino Hunte	21	4	25
12	(Netherlands) Arjan Swinkels	20	3	23
12	(Netherlands) Simon Janssen	19	4	23
14	(Cape Verde) Kristopher da Graça	20	2	22
15	(Netherlands) Evert Linthorst	16	3	19
16	(Germany) Steffen Schäfer	13	5	18
17	(The Gambia) Leon Guwara	16	1	17
17	(Netherlands) Tristan Dekker	15	2	17
17	(Suriname) Yahcuroo Roemer	15	2	17
20	(Germany) Lukas Schmitz	12	1	13
21	(Netherlands) Guus Hupperts	11	1	12
22	(Greece) Christos Donis	9	2	11
23	(Netherlands) Delano van Crooij	6	3	9
24	(Netherlands) Stan van Dijck	7	0	7
24	(Germany) Meritan Shabani	5	2	7
26	(Greece) Anastasios Donis	5	1	6
26	(Netherlands) Wassim Essanoussi	5	1	6
28	(Croatia) Ante Ćorić	1	2	3
29	(Netherlands) Aaron Bastiaans	0	2	2

=== Clean sheets ===
#	Player	Eredivisie
1	(Germany) Thorsten Kirschbaum	1

=== Disciplinary record ===
#	Player	Eredivisie		KNVB		Total	
#	Player	Yellow card	Red card	Yellow card	Red card	Yellow card	Red card
1	(Netherlands) Christian Kum	1	2	0	0	1	2
2	(Switzerland) Roy Gelmi	2	1	1	0	3	1
3	(Netherlands) Simon Janssen	0	1	0	0	0	1
3	(Germany) Tobias Pachonik	0	1	0	0	0	1
5	(Netherlands) Danny Post	8	0	1	0	9	0
6	(Netherlands) Vito van Crooij	8	0	0	0	8	0
7	(Greece) Giorgos Giakoumakis	5	0	1	0	6	0
8	(France) Zinédine Machach	3	0	0	0	3	0
9	(Cape Verde) Kristopher da Graça	2	0	0	0	2	0
9	(Netherlands) Torino Hunte	2	0	0	0	2	0
11	(Greece) Anastasios Donis	1	0	0	0	1	0
11	(Netherlands) Arjan Swinkels	0	0	1	0	1	0
11	(Netherlands) Evert Linthorst	1	0	0	0	1	0
11	(Netherlands) Guus Hupperts	1	0	0	0	1	0
11	(Curaçao) Jafar Arias	1	0	0	0	1	0
11	(Aruba) Joshua John	1	0	0	0	1	0
11	(Germany) Lukas Schmitz	1	0	0	0	1	0
11	(Germany) Thorsten Kirschbaum	1	0	0	0	1	0
11	(Netherlands) Tristan Dekker	1	0	0	0	1	0
