= 2019–20 VVV-Venlo season =

VVV-Venlo
2019–20 season
- Chairman: Hai Berden
- Head coach: Hans de Koning
- Stadium: De Koel
- Eredivisie: 13th
- KNVB Cup: 1st round
- Top goalscorer: League: Johnatan Opoku (6 goals); All: Johnatan Opoku (7 goals)
- Highest home attendance: 8,000 (2nd week)
- Lowest home attendance: 5,560 (1st week)
- Average home league attendance: 6,580
- Biggest win: 3-1 RKC Waalwijk (h) 1st week 2-0 FC Emmen (h) 16th week
- Biggest defeat: 6-1 Heracles Almelo (a) 13th week
Home colours	Away colours
- All statistics correct as of 1 August 2026.

The 2019–20 season was the 115th season in the history of VVV-Venlo, and the club's 23rd season in the Eredivisie, marking a third consecutive campaign in the top flight of Dutch football.

Alongside the Eredivisie, VVV-Venlo also competed in the KNVB Cup, where they were eliminated in the second round after a 1–1 draw, eventually losing 4–2 in the penalty shoot-out to RKSV Groene Ster.

The season covered the period from 1 July 2019 to 30 June 2020. Although the official season concluded on 30 June 2020, the Eredivisie campaign was suspended due to the COVID-19 pandemic and officially abandoned by the Royal Dutch Football Association (KNVB) on 24 April 2020. The standings at the time of suspension were declared final, with no league champion awarded and no clubs promoted or relegated.

Johnatan Opoku finished the season as VVV-Venlo's leading scorer with 7 goals, 6 goals in the Eredivisie and 1 goal in KNVB Cup.

Tobias Pachonik made more appearances than any other VVV-Venlo player during the season, featuring in 27 matches across all competitions, consisting of 26 Eredivisie appearances and 1 KNVB Cup appearance.

== Players ==
=== Current squad ===
As of 30 January 2020

Note: Flags indicate national team as defined under FIFA eligibility rules; some limited exceptions apply. Players may hold more than one non-FIFA nationality.

No.	Pos.	Nation	Player
1	GK	GER	Thorsten Kirschbaum
2	DF	GER	Tobias Pachonik
4	DF	NED	Roel Janssen
5	DF	GER	Steffen Schäfer
6	MF	NED	Danny Post (captain)
7	FW	USA	Haji Wright
9	FW	GER	Elia Soriano
10	MF	NED	Johnatan Opoku
13	DF	GER	Nils Röseler
14	DF	NED	Christian Kum
15	FW	ENG	Jerome Sinclair
15	MF	GER	Richard Neudecker
16	GK	NED	Delano van Crooy

No.	Pos.	Nation	Player
17	DF	NED	Tristan Dekker
18	DF	SUI	Roy Gelmi
18	DF	ISR	Samuel Scheimann
19	MF	GER	John Yeboah
20	MF	NED	Damian van Bruggen
20	MF	NED	Thomas Bruns
24	MF	NED	Simon Janssen
25	MF	NED	Aaron Bastiaans
25	MF	NED	Peter van Ooijen
26	DF	NED	Stan van Dijck
29	MF	NED	Evert Linthorst
29	FW	ALG	Oussama Darfalou
31	MF	ENG	Lee Cattermole

== Pre-season and friendlies ==
Win Draw Loss

5 July 2019 Friendly	VVV-Venlo (Netherlands)	3–3	(Belgium) Sint-Truiden	Horst, Netherlands
16:30				Stadium: Sportpark Ter Horst

13 July 2019 Friendly	VfL Wolfsburg (Germany)	2–2	(Netherlands) VVV-Venlo	Gifhorn, Germany
15:30				Stadium: GWG-Stadion A-Platz

16 July 2019 Friendly	SV Straelen (Germany)	1–2	(Netherlands) VVV-Venlo	Straelen, Germany
15:30				Stadium: Sportzentrum an der Römerstraße

20 July 2019 Friendly	VVV-Venlo (Netherlands)	2–0	(Netherlands) FC Eindhoven	Venlo, Netherlands
15:30				Stadium: De Koel

27 July 2019 Friendly	VVV-Venlo (Netherlands)	0–1	(Greece) Panathinaikos	Venlo, Netherlands
16:30				Stadium: De Koel

10 January 2020 Friendly	VVV-Venlo (Netherlands)	1–1	(Belgium) Kortrijk	Venlo, Netherlands
18:00				Stadium: De Koel

== Transfers ==
=== In ===
Pos.	Player	Transferred from	Fee	Date
MF	(Netherlands) Thomas Bruns	(Netherlands) FC Groningen	End of loan	30 June 2019
FW	(England) Jerome Sinclair	(England) Watford F.C.	On loan	1 July 2019
FW	(Germany) Elia Soriano	(Poland) Korona Kielce	Free	1 July 2019
MF	(Germany) Richard Neudecker	(Germany) FC St. Pauli	Free	1 July 2019
DF	(Israel) Samuel Scheimann	(Israel) Beitar Jerusalem F.C.	Free	1 July 2019
DF	(Germany) Steffen Schäfer	(Germany) 1. FC Magdeburg	Free	1 July 2019
GK	(Germany) Thorsten Kirschbaum	(Germany) Bayer 04 Leverkusen	Free	1 July 2019
FW	(Ecuador) John Yeboah	(Germany) VfL Wolfsburg	On loan	2 July 2019
DF	(Germany) Tobias Pachonik	(Italy) AC Carpi	Free	11 July 2019
FW	(United States) Haji Wright	(Germany) FC Schalke 04 II	Free	12 July 2019
MF	(England) Lee Cattermole	(England) Sunderland A.F.C.	Free	22 August 2019
FW	(Algeria) Oussama Darfalou	(Netherlands) SBV Vitesse	On loan	7 January 2020
DF	(Switzerland) Roy Gelmi	(Switzerland) FC Thun	On loan	30 January 2020

=== Out ===
Pos.	Player	Transferred to	Fee	Date
FW	(Suriname) Jay-Roy Grot	(England) Leeds United F.C.	End of loan	30 June 2019
GK	(Germany) Lars Unnerstall	(Netherlands) PSV Eindhoven	end of loan	30 June 2019
FW	(Netherlands) Patrick Joosten	(Netherlands) FC Utrecht	End of loan	30 June 2019
MF	(Netherlands) Sem Steijn	(Netherlands) ADO Den Haag U19	End of loan	30 June 2019
DF	(Netherlands) Jerold Promes	End of career		1 July 2019
DF	(Netherlands) Moreno Rutten	(Italy) FC Crotone	Free	1 July 2019
DF	(Cape Verde) Josimar Lima	(Netherlands) ASWH	Free	2 July 2019
FW	(Togo) Peniel Mlapa	(United Arab Emirates) Kalba FC	€2,500,000	2 July 2019
MF	(Bosnia and Herzegovina) Tino-Sven Sušić	No club		2 July 2019
DF	(Turkey) Evren Korkmaz	(Turkey) Adanaspor	Free	16 July 2019
MF	(Germany) Axel Borgmann	(Germany) FC Energie Cottbus	Free	11 August 2019
DF	(Netherlands) Damian van Bruggen	(Croatia) NK Inker Zaprešić		18 January 2020
DF	(Israel) Samuel Scheimann	(Israel) Hapoel Ironi Kiryat Shmona F.C.	Free	27 January 2020
FW	(Germany) Elia Soriano	(Israel) Hapoel Ra'anana A.F.C.	Free	28 January 2020

== Competitions ==
=== Overall record ===
Competition	First match	Last match	Starting round	Final position	Record							
Competition	First match	Last match	Starting round	Final position	Pld	W	D	L	GF	GA	GD	Win %
Eredivisie	3 August 2019	7 March 2020	Week 1	13th	26	8	4	14	24	51	−27	30.77
KNVB Cup	30 October 2019		1st round	1st round	1	0	1	0	2	2	+0	0.00
Total					27	8	5	14	26	53	−27	29.63

Last updated: 7 March 2020
Source: ESPN

=== Eredivisie ===
==== League table ====
Pos	Team	Pld	W	D	L	GF	GA	GD	Pts
11	Sparta Rotterdam	26	9	6	11	41	45	−4	33
12	FC Emmen	26	9	5	12	32	45	−13	32
13	VVV-Venlo	26	8	4	14	24	51	−27	28
14	FC Twente	26	7	6	13	34	46	−12	27
15	PEC Zwolle	26	7	5	14	37	55	−18	26

Source: eredivisie.nl
Rules for classification: Season in progress: 1) Most points won; 2) Less points lost; 3) Goal difference; 4) Goals scored; 5) Alphabetical order; End of season: 1) Points; 2) Goal difference; 3) Goals scored; 4) Head-to-head points; 5) Head-to-head goal difference; 6) Head-to-head away goals scored; 7) Play-off if relevant for deciding champion, relegation or participating in a European league, otherwise by draw. 8) Penalty shoot-out (only after a play-off)

==== Results summary ====
Overall								Home						Away					
Pld	W	D	L	GF	GA	GD	Pts	W	D	L	GF	GA	GD	W	D	L	GF	GA	GD
26	8	4	14	24	51	−27	28	5	3	5	14	21	−7	3	1	9	10	30	−20

Last updated: 7 March 2020.
Source: Eredivisie

==== Results by round ====
Round	1	2	3	4	5	6	7	8	9	10	11	12	13	14	15	16	17	18	19	20	21	22	23	24	25	26	27	28	29	30	31	32	33	34
Ground	H	A	H	A	A	H	A	H	A	H	A	H	A	H	A	H	H	A	H	A	H	A	H	A	H	A	H	A	H	A	A	H	A	H
Result	W	L	L	W	L	W	L	L	L	L	L	L	L	W	L	W	L	L	D	W	D	D	W	W	D	L	C	C	C	C	C	C	C	C
Position	4	10	12	9	12	9	11	12	13	15	17	17	17	16	16	15	16	16	17	15	16	16	15	14	13	13	13	13	13	13	13	13	13	13

Updated to match(es) played on 7 March 2020. Source: Eredivisie
A = Away; H = Home; W = Win; D = Draw; L = Loss

=== Matches ===
Win Draw Loss

==== 1st half ====
The Eredivisie schedule was announced on 14 June 2019. The 2019–20 season was abandoned on 24 April 2020, due to the coronavirus pandemic in the Netherlands.

3 August 2019 1st week	VVV-Venlo	3–1	RKC Waalwijk	Venlo
20:45	Elia Soriano 51'; Johnatan Opoku 61' (pen.); Peter van Ooijen 87'	Report	Hannes Delcroix 11'	Stadium: Seacon Stadion – De Koel – Attendance: 5,560

9 August 2019 2nd week	Sparta Rotterdam	4–1	VVV-Venlo	Rotterdam
20:00	Halil Dervişoğlu 56'; Ragnar Ache 61'; Abdou Harroui 83'; Lars Veldwijk 89'	Report	Peter van Ooijen 20'	Stadium: Het Kasteel; Attendance: 10,012

17 August 2019 3rd week	VVV-Venlo	1–4	AFC Ajax	Venlo
18:30	Peter van Ooijen (yellow card) 33'; Roel Janssen (yellow card) 48'; Evert Linthorst 89'	Report	Lisandro Martínez (yellow card) 27'; Donny van de Beek (yellow card) 42'; *Hakim Ziyech 44'; Dušan Tadić 49' (pen.); Klaas-Jan Huntelaar 66'; David Neres 76'	Stadium: Seacon Stadion – De Koel – Attendance: 8,000; Referee: Danny Makkelie

25 August 2019 4th week	FC Utrecht	1–2	VVV-Venlo	Utrecht
14:30	Adrián Dalmau 76'	Report	Jerome Sinclair (yellow card) 18'; Roel Janssen (yellow card) 29'; Evert Linthorst 37' 44'; Lee Cattermole (yellow card) 84'	Stadium: Stadion Galgenwaard; Attendance: 17,986; Referee: Jochem Kamphuis

31 August 2019 5th week	ADO Den Haag	1–0	VVV-Venlo	The Hague
20:45	Shaquille Pinas 45+1'	Report		Stadium: Cars Jeans Stadion; Attendance: 10,617; Referee: Siemen Mulder

14 September 2019 6th week	VVV-Venlo	2–1	FC Groningen	Venlo
19:45	John Yeboah 12'; Evert Linthorst 84'	Report	Ajdin Hrustic 44'	Stadium: Seacon Stadion – De Koel – Attendance: 6,265

21 September 2019 7th week	Willem II Tilburg	1–0	VVV-Venlo	Tilburg
19:45	Vangelis Pavlidis 22'	Report		Stadium: Koning Willem II Stadion; Attendance: 13,227; Referee: Rob Dieperink

28 September 2019 8th week	VVV-Venlo	0–3	SC Heerenveen	Venlo
18:30		Report	Chidera Ejuke 8' 13'; Jens Odgaard 87'	Stadium: Seacon Stadion – De Koel – Attendance: 5,944

6 October 2019 9th week	PSV Eindhoven	4–1	VVV-Venlo	Eindhoven
16:45	Steven Bergwijn 61'; Denzel Dumfries 65'; Donyell Malen 70' 86'	Report	Thorsten Kirschbaum (yellow card) 60'; Tobias Pachonik 73'	Stadium: Philips Stadion; Attendance: 33,000; Referee: Allard Lindhout

19 October 2019 10th week	VVV-Venlo	0–4	SBV Vitesse	Venlo
20:45		Report	Bryan Linssen 29' 34'; Riechedly Bazoer 43'; Nouha Dicko 53'	Stadium: Seacon Stadion – De Koel – Attendance: 5,992

26 October 2019 11th week	Fortuna Sittard	4–1	VVV-Venlo	Sittard
20:15	Mark Diemers 9' 26' 87' (pen.); Amadou Ciss 50'	Report	Johnatan Opoku 72'	Stadium: Fortuna Sittard Stadion; Attendance: 8,388; Referee: Danny Makkelie

3 November 2019 12th	VVV-Venlo	0–3	Feyenoord	Venlo
14:30		Report	Nicolai Jørgensen 18'; Steven Berghuis 34' 90+1' (pen.)	Stadium: Seacon Stadion – De Koel – Attendance: 6,572; Referee: Kevin Blom

9 November 2019 13th week	Heracles Almelo	6–1	VVV-Venlo	Almelo
20:45	Alexander Merkel 23'; Silvester van der Water 41'; Cyriel Dessers 56' 64' 82'; Mauro Júnior 60'	Report	Peter van Ooijen 74'	Stadium: Asito Stadion; Attendance: 9,400

24 November 2019 14th week	VVV-Venlo	2–1	FC Twente	Venlo
16:45	Peter van Ooijen 34'; Elia Soriano 36'	Report	Haris Vuckic 41'	Stadium: Seacon Stadion – De Koel – Attendance: 6,730; Referee: Sander van der Eijk

1 December 2019 15th week	AZ Alkmaar	1–0	VVV-Venlo	The Hague
16:45	Yukinari Sugawara 39'	Report		Stadium: Cars Jeans Stadion; Attendance: 6,007; Referee: Martin van den Kerkhof

7 December 2019 16th week	VVV-Venlo	2–0	FC Emmen	Venlo
19:45	Johnatan Opoku 7'; Peter van Ooijen 90+5'	Report		Stadium: Seacon Stadion – De Koel – Attendance: 6,580

14 December 2019 17th week	VVV-Venlo	1–2	PEC Zwolle	Venlo
19:45	Aaron Bastiaans 77'	Report	Kenneth Paal 11'; Pelle Clement 24'	Stadium: Seacon Stadion – De Koel – Attendance: 6,861

22 December 2019 18th week	SBV Vitesse	3–0	VVV-Venlo	Arnhem
16:45	Riechedly Bazoer 27'; Tim Matavž 30'; Bryan Linssen 71'	Report		Stadium: GelreDome; Attendance: 13,454

==== 2nd half ====
19 January 2020 19th week	VVV-Venlo	1–1	PSV Eindhoven	Venlo
12:15	Johnatan Opoku 68' (pen.)	Report	Denzel Dumfries 90+2'	Stadium: Seacon Stadion – De Koel – Attendance: 7,059; Referee: Danny Makkelie

25 January 2020 20th week	RKC Waalwijk	1–2	VVV-Venlo	Waalwijk
19:45	Emil Hansson 15'	Report	Johnatan Opoku 76'; Oussama Darfalou 82'	Stadium: Mandemakers Stadion; Attendance: 6,103

2 February 2020 21st week	VVV-Venlo	1–1	FC Utrecht	Venlo
14:30	Oussama Darfalou 51' (pen.)	Report	Simon Gustafson 81' (pen.)	Stadium: Seacon Stadion – De Koel – Attendance: 6,265

8 February 2020 22nd week	SC Heerenveen	1–1	VVV-Venlo	Heerenveen
19:45	Sherel Floranus 69'	Report	Johnatan Opoku 57' (pen.)	Stadium: Abe Lenstra Stadion; Attendance: 16,400

14 February 2020 23rd week	VVV-Venlo	1–0	Heracles Almelo	Venlo
20:00	Danny Post 21'	Report		Stadium: Seacon Stadion – De Koel – Attendance: 6,594

22 February 2020 24th week	FC Groningen	0–1	VVV-Venlo	Groningen
20:45		Report	Oussama Darfalou 87'	Stadium: Euroborg; Attendance: 16,734

29 February 2020 25th week	VVV-Venlo	0–0	Fortuna Sittard	Venlo
19:45	Danny Post (yellow card) 16'; Roel Janssen (yellow card) 40'	Report	Wessel Dammers (yellow card) 27'; Vitalie Damașcan (yellow card) 64'; Felix Passlack (yellow card) 85'	Stadium: Seacon Stadion – De Koel – Attendance: 7,115; Referee: Danny Makkelie

7 March 2020 26th week	FC Emmen	3–0	VVV-Venlo	Emmen
19:45	Nikolai Laursen 49' 74'; Marko Kolar 56'	Report		Stadium: De Oude Meerdijk; Attendance: 8,100

15 March 2020 27th week (Note: The match is cancelled due to the COVID-19 pandemic in the Netherlands)	VVV-Venlo	Cancelled	AZ Alkmaar

21 March 2020 28th week	PEC Zwolle	Cancelled	VVV-Venlo

4 April 2020 29th week	VVV-Venlo	Cancelled	Willem II Tilburg

11 April 2020 30th week	Feyenoord	Cancelled	VVV-Venlo

23 April 2020 31st week	FC Twente	Cancelled	VVV-Venlo

26 April 2020 32nd week	VVV-Venlo	Cancelled	ADO Den Haag

3 May 2020 33rd week	AFC Ajax	Cancelled	VVV-Venlo

10 May 2020 34th week	VVV-Venlo	Cancelled	Sparta Rotterdam

=== KNVB Cup ===
30 October 2019 1st round	Groene Ster	2–2 (a.e.t.) (4–2 p)	VVV-Venlo	Heerlerheide
19:45	Thom Vluggen 66' (pen.); Maikel van Kesteren 84'	Report	Jonathan Opoku 57' (pen.); Haji Wright 90+4'	Stadium: Pronsebroek; Referee: Robin Hensgens
	Penalties
	Danny Stassar (penalty scored); Cem Unal (penalty scored); Jorrit Ritzen (penalty scored); Kjell Knops (penalty scored)		(penalty scored) Jonathan Opoku; (penalty scored) Peter van Ooijen; (penalty missed) Richard Neudecker; (penalty missed) Haji Wright

== Statistics ==
=== Scorers ===
#	Player	Eredivisie	KNVB	Total
1	(Netherlands) Johnatan Opoku	6	1	7
2	(Netherlands) Peter van Ooijen	5	0	5
3	(Netherlands) Evert Linthorst	4	0	4
4	(Algeria) Oussama Darfalou	3	0	3
5	(Germany) Elia Soriano	2	0	2
5	(Ecuador) John Yeboah	2	0	2
7	(Netherlands) Aaron Bastiaans	1	0	1
7	(Netherlands) Danny Post	1	0	1
7	(Germany) Tobias Pachonik	1	0	1
7	(United States) Haji Wright	1	0	1

=== Appearances ===
#	Player	Eredivisie	KNVB	Total
1	(Germany) Tobias Pachonik	26	1	27
2	(Germany) Thorsten Kirschbaum	26	0	26
2	(Germany) Nils Röseler	25	1	26
4	(England) Jerome Sinclair	23	1	24
5	(United States) Haji Wright	22	1	23
5	(Netherlands) Peter van Ooijen	22	1	23
7	(Netherlands) Roel Janssen	21	0	21
7	(Netherlands) Danny Post	20	1	21
9	(Netherlands) Christian Kum	20	0	20
9	(Netherlands) Johnatan Opoku	19	1	20
11	(Netherlands) Evert Linthorst	18	1	19
12	(Ecuador) John Yeboah	18	0	18
13	(Germany) Elia Soriano	16	1	17
13	(Germany) Richard Neudecker	16	1	17
15	(England) Lee Cattermole	11	0	11
16	(Germany) Steffen Schäfer	9	1	10
17	(Israel) Samuel Scheimann	8	1	9
18	(Algeria) Oussama Darfalou	8	0	8
19	(Netherlands) Simon Janssen	7	0	7
20	(Netherlands) Thomas Bruns	6	0	6
21	(Netherlands) Damian van Bruggen	4	0	4
21	(Netherlands) Tristan Dekker	4	0	4
23	(Switzerland) Roy Gelmi	3	0	3
23	(Netherlands) Stan van Dijck	3	0	3
25	(Netherlands) Aaron Bastiaans	1	0	1
25	(Netherlands) Delano van Crooij	0	1	1

=== Clean sheets ===
#	Player	Eredivisie
1	(Germany) Thorsten Kirschbaum	4

=== Disciplinary record ===
#	Player	Eredivisie		KNVB		Total	
#	Player	Yellow card	Red card	Yellow card	Red card	Yellow card	Red card
1	(Netherlands) Danny Post	8	0	0	0	8	0
2	(Netherlands) Roel Janssen	6	0	0	0	6	0
3	(Netherlands) Peter van Ooijen	4	0	0	0	4	0
4	(Netherlands) Christian Kum	3	0	0	0	3	0
4	(Netherlands) Evert Linthorst	3	0	0	0	3	0
4	(England) Jerome Sinclair	3	0	0	0	3	0
4	(England) Lee Cattermole	3	0	0	0	3	0
4	(Germany) Nils Roseler	3	0	0	0	3	0
4	(Germany) Richard Neudecker	2	0	1	0	3	0
10	(Germany) Thorsten Kirschbaum	2	0	0	0	2	0
10	(Germany) Tobias Pachonik	2	0	0	0	2	0
12	(England) Jerome Sinclair	1	0	0	0	1	0
12	(England) Lee Cattermole	1	0	0	0	1	0
12	(Algeria) Oussama Darfalou	1	0	0	0	1	0
