= 2020–21 KNVB Cup =

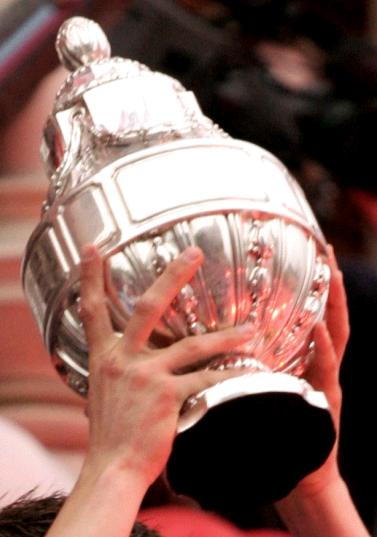
- KNVB Cup trophy

Tournament details
- Country: Netherlands
- Venue(s): De Kuip, Rotterdam
- Dates: 29 August 2020 – 18 April 2021
- Teams: 64 (114 including preliminaries)

Final positions
- Champions: Ajax (20th title)
- Runners-up: Vitesse

Tournament statistics
- Matches played: 83
- Goals scored: 315 (3.8 per match)
- Top goal scorer(s): Mike Reuvers; Guytano dos Santos; Niels Springer (4 goals each)

The 2020–21 KNVB Cup, for sponsoring reasons officially called the TOTO KNVB Beker, was the 103rd edition of the Dutch national football annual knockout tournament for the KNVB Cup. 64 teams contested, beginning on 29 August 2020 with the first of two preliminary rounds, and ending on 18 April 2021 at the final played at De Kuip in Rotterdam.

Ajax successfully defended its 2019 title, with the 2020 final cancelled due to the COVID-19 pandemic in the Netherlands. Ajax went on to successfully defend their title after defeating Vitesse 2–1 in the final.

As winners of both the KNVB Cup and the 2020–21 Eredivisie, Ajax contested the 2021 Johan Cruyff Shield against PSV, the Eredivisie runners-up.

== Effects of the COVID-19 pandemic ==
Due to the COVID-19 pandemic, all six district cups were abandoned, before any of them had reached the semi-finals. This meant that none of the 24 qualifiers from the Hoofdklasse and lower were known at the time of the abandonment. The KNVB decided through a scheme which four teams would qualify per district. The same scheme is also used when a team reaches the semi-finals of the district cup but wins promotion to the Derde Divisie in the same season (and by that qualifying in two ways for the KNVB Cup)

On 14 October 2020, the KNVB announced that all first round matches involving amateur teams would be postponed until 1 and 2 December as a result of new measures taken by the government to stop the spread of the virus. If the amateur teams are still not allowed to play matches by 2 December they will be excluded from further participation. On 17 November 2020, the KNVB's director of amateur football Jan Dirk van der Zee confirmed that the KNVB Cup would continue without the amateur teams.

== Schedule ==
Round	Draw	Match Dates
First preliminary round	23 July 2020	29 and 30 August 2020
Second preliminary round	23 July 2020	6–8 October 2020
First round	3 October 2020	26–28 October; ~~1 and 2 December 2020~~
Second round	21 November 2020	15–17 December 2020
Round of 16	19 December 2020	19–21 January 2021
Quarter-finals	23 January 2021	9–10 and 17 February 2021
Semi-finals	13 February 2021	2–3 March 2021
Final	13 February 2021	18 April 2021

== Matches ==
=== Preliminary rounds ===
The draw for the first two preliminary rounds was performed on 23 July 2020 at 19:00 CEST, and was broadcast live on YouTube. The draw was conducted by Martijn van Oers, player of DWOW, the lowest ranked club that qualified for the Cup this season.

==== First preliminary round ====
60 amateur teams qualified for this stage: 24 teams which qualified through the 2019–20 district cup tournaments and 36 teams from the 2020–21 Derde Divisie. The draw was performed on 23 July 2020.

29 August 2020	VV Capelle (5)	4–0	VV Hoogland (4)	Capelle aan den IJssel
14:30 CEST				Stadium: Sportpark 't Slot

29 August 2020	Cluzona (7)	0–4	Sparta Nijkerk (4)	Wouw
14:30 CEST				Stadium: Sportpark De Doelen

29 August 2020	DVS '33 (4)	3–1	VV Dongen (4)	Ermelo
14:30 CEST				Stadium: Sportpark DVS '33

29 August 2020	FC Rijnvogels (5)	1–1 (a.e.t.) (4–2 p)	JOS Watergraafsmeer (4)	Katwijk aan den Rijn
14:30 CEST				Stadium: Sportpark De Kooltuin

29 August 2020	VVOG (4)	0–2 (a.e.t.)	RKVV DEM (4)	Harderwijk
14:30 CEST				Stadium: Sportpark De Strokel

29 August 2020	HSV Hoek (4)	1–3	OFC Oostzaan (4)	Hoek
15:00 CEST				Stadium: Sportpark Denoek

29 August 2020	Harkemase Boys (4)	6–0	USV Hercules (4)	Harkema
15:00 CEST				Stadium: Sportpark De Bosk

29 August 2020	Ter Leede (4)	6–2	VV Hoogezand (6)	Sassenheim
15:00 CEST				Stadium: Sportpark Roodemolen

29 August 2020	DOS Kampen (6)	0–0 (a.e.t.) (5–4 p)	RKVV EVV (4)	Kampen
17:00 CEST				Stadium: Sportpark De Maten

29 August 2020	BVV Barendrecht (4)	5–0	RKVV Erp (6)	Barendrecht
17:00 CEST				Stadium: Sportpark De Bongerd

29 August 2020	VV GOES (4)	1–0 (a.e.t.)	Sportlust '46 (4)	Goes
17:00 CEST				Stadium: Sportpark Het Schenge

29 August 2020	DWOW (8)	2–5	VV Buitenpost (5)	Wieringerwerf
17:00 CEST				Stadium: Sportpark De Wilskracht

29 August 2020	DTS '35 Ede (6)	4–0	RKVV Best Vooruit (6)	Ede
17:00 CEST				Stadium: Sportpark Inschoten

29 August 2020	DUNO D (5)	1–3	VV UNA (4)	Doorwerth
17:00 CEST				Stadium: Sportpark De Waayenberg

29 August 2020	ACV (4)	0–2 (a.e.t.)	VV Gemert (4)	Assen
17:00 CEST				Stadium: Catawiki Sportpark

29 August 2020	Roda '46 (6)	1–1 (a.e.t.) (4–3 p)	ADO '20 (4)	Leusden
17:00 CEST				Stadium: Burgemeester Buiningpark

29 August 2020	AWC (5)	3–4 (a.e.t.)	ODIN '59 (4)	Wijchen
17:00 CEST				Stadium: Sportpark De Wijchert

29 August 2020	VV Hoogeveen (5)	2–2 (a.e.t.) (1–4 p)	VV DOVO (4)	Hoogeveen
17:00 CEST				Stadium: Sportpark Bentinckspark

29 August 2020	SteDoCo (4)	10–0	SV Den Hoorn (6)	Hoornaar
17:00 CEST				Stadium: Sportpark SteDoCo

29 August 2020	HVV Hollandia (4)	0–0 (a.e.t.) (1–3 p)	Flevo Boys (5)	Hoorn
17:00 CEST				Stadium: Sportpark Juliana

29 August 2020	VV Sliedrecht (6)	2–2 (a.e.t.) (4–3 p)	VVSB (4)	Sliedrecht
17:00 CEST				Stadium: Sportpark De Lockhorst

29 August 2020	VV Scherpenzeel (5)	2–3	RKSV Groene Ster (4)	Scherpenzeel
17:00 CEST				Stadium: Sportpark De Bree-Oost

29 August 2020	Oss '20 (4)	5–2	Ajax (amateur team) (4)	Oss
17:00 CEST				Stadium: Sportpark de Rusheuvel

29 August 2020	VV Staphorst (4)	2–0	HSC '21 (4)	Staphorst
17:00 CEST				Stadium: Sportpark Het Noorderslag

29 August 2020	Excelsior '31 (4)	3–0	SC Susteren (6)	Rijssen
17:00 CEST				Stadium: Sportpark De Koerbelt

29 August 2020	AFC (Saturday team) (6)	1–2	GVV Unitas (4)	Amsterdam
17:00 CEST				Stadium: Sportpark Goed Genoeg

29 August 2020	FC Lisse (4)	3–0	Blauw Geel '38 (4)	Lisse
17:00 CEST				Stadium: Sportpark Ter Specke

29 August 2020	Achilles Veen (5)	5–0	NWC (7)	Veen
18:00 CEST				Stadium: Sportpark De Hanen Weide

29 August 2020	SVC'08 (7)	1–5	Quick (4)	Wassenaar
18:00 CEST				Stadium: Oostersportpark

30 August 2020	RKVV Westlandia (4)	4–1	SV Venray (6)	Naaldwijk
14:00 CEST				Stadium: Sportpark De Hoge Bomen

==== Second preliminary round ====
In the second preliminary round, 14 teams from the Tweede Divisie enter the tournament, as the two teams that won a period title in the 2019–20 season (IJsselmeervogels and VV Katwijk) got a bye to the first round.

Since last season, teams who qualify for the group stage of the UEFA Champions League and the UEFA Europa League get a bye to the second round, leaving empty spots in the first round. However, as this season the draw for the second preliminary round was made before the end of the qualifying rounds and play-off rounds of both European competitions, it was not known yet how many Dutch clubs reached the group stage of both competitions. At the time of the draw, only Ajax and Feyenoord were assured of that, so the winners of match 27 in the first preliminary round (who turned out to be Quick) and SV TEC were drawn a bye to compensate.

The Royal Dutch Football Association solved the rest of the puzzle by hold a worst-case-scenario into account, therefore the last three matches drawn are subject of the performances of AZ, PSV and Willem II in the qualifying rounds of the 2020–21 UEFA Champions League and the 2020–21 UEFA Europa League. If all three of them qualify for the group stage, then all matches will be played as normal. If one of them fail to qualify, match 21 will not be played. If two of them fail to qualify, match 20 will also not be played, and if all three teams fail to qualify, match 19 will not be played as well. All the teams of the matches that will not be played will be given byes to the first round.

AZ won their match in the second qualifying round (League Route) of the Champions League on 26 August, assuring the Europa League group stage at worst in the process. This simultaneously assured match 19 in the second preliminary round to go ahead and placed AZ in the second round instead of the first round.

6 October 2020	VV Buitenpost (5)	1–1 (a.e.t.) (5–6 p)	VV Capelle (5)	Buitenpost
18:00 CEST				Stadium: Sportpark De Swadde

6 October 2020	FC Lisse (4)	0–3	SteDoCo (4)	Lisse
18:00 CEST				Stadium: Sportpark Ter Specke

6 October 2020	VV DOVO (4)	0–1	DVS '33 (4)	Veenendaal
18:00 CEST				Stadium: Sportpark Panhuis

7 October 2020	OFC Oostzaan (4)	7–1	DOS Kampen (6)	Oostzaan
18:00 CEST				Stadium: Sportpark OFC

6 October 2020	VV Noordwijk (3)	2–3 (a.e.t.)	VV Sliedrecht (6)	Noordwijk
18:00 CEST				Stadium: Sportpark Duinwetering

6 October 2020	VV Staphorst (4)	5–2	ASWH (3)	Staphorst
18:00 CEST				Stadium: Sportpark Het Noorderslag

13 October 2020	Quick Boys (3)	5–0	Roda '46 (6)	Katwijk aan Zee
18:00 CEST				Stadium: Sportpark Nieuw Zuid

6 October 2020	De Treffers (3)	1–2 (a.e.t.)	BVV Barendrecht (4)	Groesbeek
18:00 CEST				Stadium: Sportpark Zuid

6 October 2020	VV GOES (4)	1–1 (a.e.t.) (15–16 p)	ODIN '59 (4)	Goes
17:30 CEST				Stadium: Sportpark Het Schenge

7 October 2020	FC Rijnvogels (5)	2–4	VV UNA (4)	Katwijk
18:00 CEST				Stadium: Sportpark de Kooltuin

7 October 2020	Kozakken Boys (3)	1–0	RKVV DEM (4)	Werkendam
18:00 CEST				Stadium: Sportpark De Zwaaier

7 October 2020	Achilles Veen (5)	2–0	VV Gemert (4)	Veen
18:00 CEST				Stadium: Sportpark De Hanen Weide

6 October 2020	HHC Hardenberg (3)	3–2 (a.e.t.)	GVVV (3)	Hardenberg
18:00 CEST				Stadium: Sportpark De Boshoek

6 October 2020	SV Spakenburg (3)	0–1	AFC (Sunday team) (3)	Spakenburg
18:00 CEST				Stadium: Sportpark De Westmaat

7 October 2020	Koninklijke HFC (3)	0–1	Oss '20 (4)	Haarlem
18:00 CEST				Stadium: Sportpark Spanjaardslaan

7 October 2020	DTS '35 Ede (6)	3–1 (a.e.t.)	GVV Unitas (4)	Ede
18:00 CEST				Stadium: Sportpark Inschoten

6 October 2020	Excelsior Maassluis (3)	4–1	Ter Leede (4)	Maassluis
18:00 CEST				Stadium: Sportpark Dijkpolder

6 October 2020	Harkemase Boys (4)	5–2	Flevo Boys (5)	Harkema
18:00 CEST				Stadium: Sportpark De Bosk

7 October 2020	Excelsior '31 (4)	2–3 (a.e.t.)	RKSV Groene Ster (4)	Rijssen
18:00 CEST				Stadium: Sportpark De Koerbelt

6 October 2020	Sparta Nijkerk (4)	2–3	Rijnsburgse Boys (3)	Nijkerk
18:00 CEST				Stadium: Sportpark De Ebbenhorst

=== Main tournament ===
==== First round ====
26 October 2020	Excelsior (2)	4–0	Helmond Sport (2)	Rotterdam
18:45 CET	Niemeijer 26'; Ómarsson 44', 61'; Zwarts 68'	Report		Stadium: Van Donge & De Roo Stadion; Attendance: 0 Referee: Smit

26 October 2020	Go Ahead Eagles (2)	6–0	NAC Breda (2)	Deventer
21:00 CET	Beukema 7'; Hendriks 9'; Eddahchouri 12'; Veldmate 15' (pen.); Brouwers 20'; Rabillard 47'	Report		Stadium: De Adelaarshorst; Attendance: 0 Referee: Van de Graaf

27 October 2020	FC Twente	1–3	De Graafschap (2)	Enschede
18:45 CET	Staring 62'	Report	18' Hamdaoui; 34' Konings; 90+4' Lelieveld	Stadium: De Grolsch Veste; Attendance: 0 Referee: Manschot

27 October 2020	VVV-Venlo	4–2	FC Den Bosch (2)	Venlo
19:45 CET	Giakoumakis 57', 73' (pen.); Arias 60'; Pachonik 90'	Report	42', 81' Postema	Stadium: De Koel; Attendance: 0 Referee: Gerrets

27 October 2020	SC Heerenveen	3–1	TOP Oss (2)	Heerenveen
19:45 CET	Veerman 11'; Nygren 33'; Kongolo 40'	Report	29' Sanches	Stadium: Abe Lenstra Stadion; Attendance: 0 Referee: Bijl

27 October 2020	FC Dordrecht (2)	2–4	FC Utrecht	Dordrecht
21:00 CET	Agrafiotis 16', 57'	Report	5', 40' Ramselaar; 42' Kerk; 79' Van de Streek	Stadium: Riwal Hoogwerkers Stadion; Attendance: 0 Referee: Nagtegaal

28 October 2020	ADO Den Haag	1–1 (a.e.t.) (4–3 p)	Sparta Rotterdam	The Hague
18:45 CET	Koopmans 90+4'	Report	39' Gravenberch	Stadium: Cars Jeans Stadion; Attendance: 0 Referee: Mulder
	Penalties
	Kramer (penalty scored); Karelis (penalty scored); Pinas (penalty scored); Goossens (penalty scored); Ould-Chikh (penalty scored)		(penalty scored) Heylen; (penalty scored) Abels; (penalty missed) Vriends; (penalty scored) Engels

28 October 2020	FC Emmen	2–0	FC Eindhoven (2)	Emmen
19:45 CET	De Leeuw 78', 94'	Report		Stadium: De Oude Meerdijk; Attendance: 0 Referee: Oostrom

28 October 2020	Heracles Almelo	3–0	SC Telstar (2)	Almelo
19:45 CET	Bakis 29' (pen.); Vloet 73'; Szőke 90+2'	Report		Stadium: Erve Asito; Attendance: 0 Referee: Ruperti

28 October 2020	RKC Waalwijk	2–2 (a.e.t.) (3–5 p)	SC Cambuur (2)	Waalwijk
19:45 CET	Daneels 85'; Gaari 90+4'	Report	31' Pouwels; 40' Jacobs	Stadium: Mandemakers Stadion; Attendance: 0 Referee: Martens
	Penalties
	Tahiri (penalty scored); Meultensteen (penalty missed); Damașcan (penalty scored); Azhil (penalty scored)		(penalty scored) Gootjes; (penalty scored) Hoedemakers; (penalty scored) Paulissen; (penalty scored) Nieuwpoort; (penalty scored) Maulun

28 October 2020	Roda JC Kerkrade (2)	0–2	Fortuna Sittard	Kerkrade
21:00 CET			8' (pen.) Polter; 11' Flemming	Stadium: Parkstad Limburg Stadion

1 December 2020	SVV Scheveningen (3)	DQ–Bye	Almere City FC (2)	Scheveningen
19:45 CET				Stadium: Houtrust Scheveningen

1 December 2020	Rijnsburgse Boys (3)	DQ–DQ	Excelsior Maassluis (3)	Rijnsburg
19:45 CET				Stadium: Middelmors

1 December 2020	BVV Barendrecht (4)	DQ–DQ	Achilles Veen (5)	Barendrecht
19:45 CET				Stadium: Sportpark De Bongerd

1 December 2020	OFC Oostzaan (4)	DQ–Bye	MVV Maastricht (2)	Oostzaan
19:45 CET				Stadium: Sportpark OFC

1 December 2020	ODIN '59 (4)	DQ–Bye	FC Volendam (2)	Heemskerk
19:45 CET				Stadium: Sportpark Assumburg

1 December 2020	DTS '35 Ede (6)	DQ–DQ	Quick Boys (3)	Ede
19:45 CET				Stadium: Sportpark Inschoten

1 December 2020	VV Staphorst (4)	DQ–Bye	PEC Zwolle	Staphorst
19:45 CET				Stadium: Sportpark Het Noorderslag

1 December 2020	VV Sliedrecht (6)	DQ–DQ	IJsselmeervogels (3)	Sliedrecht
19:45 CET				Stadium: Sportpark De Lockhorst

2 December 2020	Quick (4)	DQ–Bye	NEC Nijmegen (2)	The Hague
19:45 CET				Stadium: Sportpark Nieuw Hanenburg

2 December 2020	VV Capelle (5)	DQ–DQ	AFC (Sunday team) (3)	Capelle aan den IJssel
19:45 CET				Stadium: Sportpark 't Slot

2 December 2020	DVS '33 (4)	DQ–Bye	Willem II	Ermelo
19:45 CET				Stadium: Sportpark Zuid

2 December 2020	Kozakken Boys (3)	DQ–DQ	Harkemase Boys (4)	Werkendam
19:45 CET				Stadium: Sportpark De Zwaaier

2 December 2020	HHC Hardenberg (3)	DQ–Bye	Vitesse	Hardenberg
19:45 CET				Stadium: Sportpark De Boshoek

2 December 2020	Oss '20 (4)	DQ–DQ	VV Katwijk (3)	Oss
19:45 CET				Stadium: Sportpark de Rusheuvel

2 December 2020	RKVV Westlandia (4)	DQ–DQ	SteDoCo (4)	Naaldwijk
19:45 CET				Stadium: De Hoge Bomen

2 December 2020	VV UNA (4)	DQ–DQ	RKSV Groene Ster (4)	Veldhoven
19:45 CET				Stadium: Sportpark Zeelst

2 December 2020	SV TEC (3)	DQ–Bye	FC Groningen	Tiel
19:45 CET				Stadium: Sportpark De Lok

==== Second round ====
15 December 2020	Excelsior (2)	2–0	PEC Zwolle	Rotterdam
18:45 CET	Oude Kotte 63'; Mendes Moreira 86'	Report		Stadium: Van Donge & De Roo Stadion; Attendance: 0 Referee: L. Gerrets

15 December 2020	FC Emmen	2–1	FC Groningen	Emmen
21:00 CET	Bijl 60'; Jansen 67'	Report	27' Lundqvist	Stadium: De Oude Meerdijk; Attendance: 0 Referee: K. Blom

16 December 2020	Almere City FC (2)	1–4	VVV-Venlo	Almere
16:30 CET	Gelmi 10' (o.g.)	Report	33' Van Crooij; 45+1', 70' Arias; 52' Linthorst	Stadium: Yanmar Stadion; Attendance: 0 Referee: B. Nijhuis

16 December 2020	De Graafschap (2)	1–2	PSV	Doetinchem
18:45 CET	Hilderink 90'	Report	56' (pen.) Max; 84' Malen	Stadium: De Vijverberg; Attendance: 0 Referee: J. Kamphuis

16 December 2020	Ajax	5–4	FC Utrecht	Amsterdam
21:00 CET	Tadić 8', 89'; Labyad 45+1', 81'; St. Jago 54' (o.g.)	Report	1', 47' Mahi; 55' Van de Streek; 70' Sylla	Stadium: Johan Cruyff Arena; Attendance: 0 Referee: D. Higler

17 December 2020	SC Cambuur (2)	1–2	Go Ahead Eagles (2)	Leeuwarden
18:45 CET	Oratmangoen 29'	Report	32' Brouwers; 63' Van Hoeven	Stadium: Cambuur Stadion; Attendance: 0 Referee: I. Oostrom

17 December 2020	Willem II	0–2	Vitesse	Tilburg
21:00 CET		Report	20' Manhoef; 63' Buitink	Stadium: Koning Willem II Stadion; Attendance: 0 Referee: S. van der Eijk

==== Round of 16 ====
On 18 November 2020, the KNVB announced that 9 teams which had qualified for the second round would be getting a bye to the round of 16, with the other 14 teams playing against another team for one of the other 7 spots in the round of 16.

19 January 2021	MVV Maastricht (2)	2–2 (a.e.t.) (4–5 p)	Excelsior (2)	Maastricht
16:30 CET	Kostons 42'; Schroyen 45'	Report	16' (pen.) Ómarsson; 71' Horemans	Stadium: De Geusselt; Attendance: 0 Referee: P. van Boekel
	Penalties
	Schroyen (penalty scored); Naudts (penalty scored); Déom (penalty scored); Mickels (penalty missed); Salasiwa (penalty scored); Mares (penalty missed)		(penalty scored) Bruins; (penalty scored) Ómarsson; (penalty scored) Verhaar; (penalty missed) Mendes Moreira; (penalty scored) Meijer; (penalty scored) Fischer

19 January 2021	Vitesse	2–1	ADO Den Haag	Arnhem
18:45 CET	Openda 25'; Bero 71'	Report	81' Ćatić	Stadium: GelreDome; Attendance: 0 Referee: D. Higler

19 January 2021	FC Volendam (2)	0–2	PSV	Volendam
21:00 CET		Report	51' Madueke; 79' (pen.) Dumfries	Stadium: Kras Stadion; Attendance: 0 Referee: C. Bax

20 January 2021	FC Emmen	1–2	SC Heerenveen	Emmen
16:30 CET	Peña 44'	Report	72' Nygren; 90' (pen.) Veerman	Stadium: De Oude Meerdijk; Attendance: 0 Referee: S. Mulder

20 January 2021	Feyenoord	3–2	Heracles Almelo	Rotterdam
18:45 CET	Sinisterra 45+2'; Linssen 53'; Geertruida 84'	Report	33' Burgzorg; 90+2' Szőke	Stadium: De Kuip; Attendance: 0 Referee: J. Manschot

20 January 2021	AZ	0–1	Ajax	Alkmaar
21:00 CET		Report	34' Labyad	Stadium: AFAS Stadion; Attendance: 0 Referee: J. Kamphuis

21 January 2021	NEC Nijmegen (2)	3–2 (a.e.t.)	Fortuna Sittard	Nijmegen
18:45 CET	Janga 64'; Bruijn 97' (pen.); Beekman 102'	Report	60', 103' Flemming	Stadium: Stadion de Goffert; Attendance: 0 Referee: K. Blom

21 January 2021	VVV-Venlo	1–0	Go Ahead Eagles (2)	Venlo
21:00 CET	Bastiaans 35'	Report		Stadium: De Koel; Referee: R. Martens

==== Quarter-finals ====
On 19 December 2020, the KNVB already performed a draw to determine which teams would be playing at home in the quarter-finals for organizational reasons. The second half of the draw was performed on 23 January 2021.

9 February 2021	Excelsior (2)	0–1	Vitesse	Rotterdam
20:00 CET		Report	90+1' Openda	Stadium: Van Donge & De Roo Stadion; Attendance: 0 Referee: D. Higler

10 February 2021	Ajax	2–1	PSV	Amsterdam
20:00 CET (Note: The match was initially scheduled to start at 21:00 CET, but was changed to 20:00 CET due to snow.)	Haller 19', 24'	Report	58' (o.g.) Timber	Stadium: Johan Cruyff Arena; Attendance: 0 Referee: S. Gözübüyük

17 February 2021 (Note: The match was initially scheduled to be held on 10 February 2021, 18:45 CET, but was postponed due to the pitch being frozen.)	NEC Nijmegen (2)	1–2 (a.e.t.)	VVV-Venlo	Almelo
16:30 CET	Janga 57'	Report	23' Giakoumakis; 105' Shabani	Stadium: Erve Asito; Attendance: 0 Referee: J. Manschot

17 February 2021 (Note: The match was initially scheduled to be held on 11 February 2021, 20:00 CET, but was postponed due to the pitch being frozen.)	SC Heerenveen	4–3	Feyenoord	Heerenveen
18:45 CET	Kaib 15'; Nygren 81'; Marsman 86' (o.g.); De Jong 88'	Report	47' Linssen; 57' Berghuis; 61' Geertruida	Stadium: Abe Lenstra Stadion; Attendance: 0 Referee: S. Mulder

==== Semi-finals ====
On 23 January 2021, the KNVB performed a draw to determine which teams would be playing at home in the semi-finals for organizational reasons. The second half of the draw was performed on 13 February 2021.

2 March 2021	Vitesse	2–0	VVV-Venlo	Arnhem
21:00 CET	Broja 75'; Tannane 84'	Report		Stadium: GelreDome; Attendance: 0 Referee: A. Lindhout

3 March 2021	SC Heerenveen	0–3	Ajax	Heerenveen
21:00 CET		Report	Klaassen 19'; Tadić 63' (pen.); Neres 77'	Stadium: Abe Lenstra Stadion; Attendance: 0 Referee: Bas Nijhuis

==== Final ====
18 April 2021
18:00 UTC+02:00

Ajax	2–1	Vitesse
Gravenberch 23'; Neres 90+1'	Report	Openda 30'

De Kuip, Rotterdam
Attendance: 0 (Note: The match was played behind closed doors due to the COVID-19 pandemic in the Netherlands.)
Referee: Björn Kuipers
