= Donis (disambiguation) =

Donis may refer to:

- Donis, a Lithuanian ambient, neofolk and experimental music project created by the Klaipėda multi-instrumentalist Donatas Bielkauskas
- Anastasios Donis, a Greek professional footballer, son of Georgios and brother Christos.
- Christos Donis, a Greek professional footballer, son of Georgios and Anastasios.
- Georgios Donis, a Greek former professional footballer and current manager, father of Anastasios and Christos.
