= Thorsten Kirschbaum =

German footballer (born 1987)

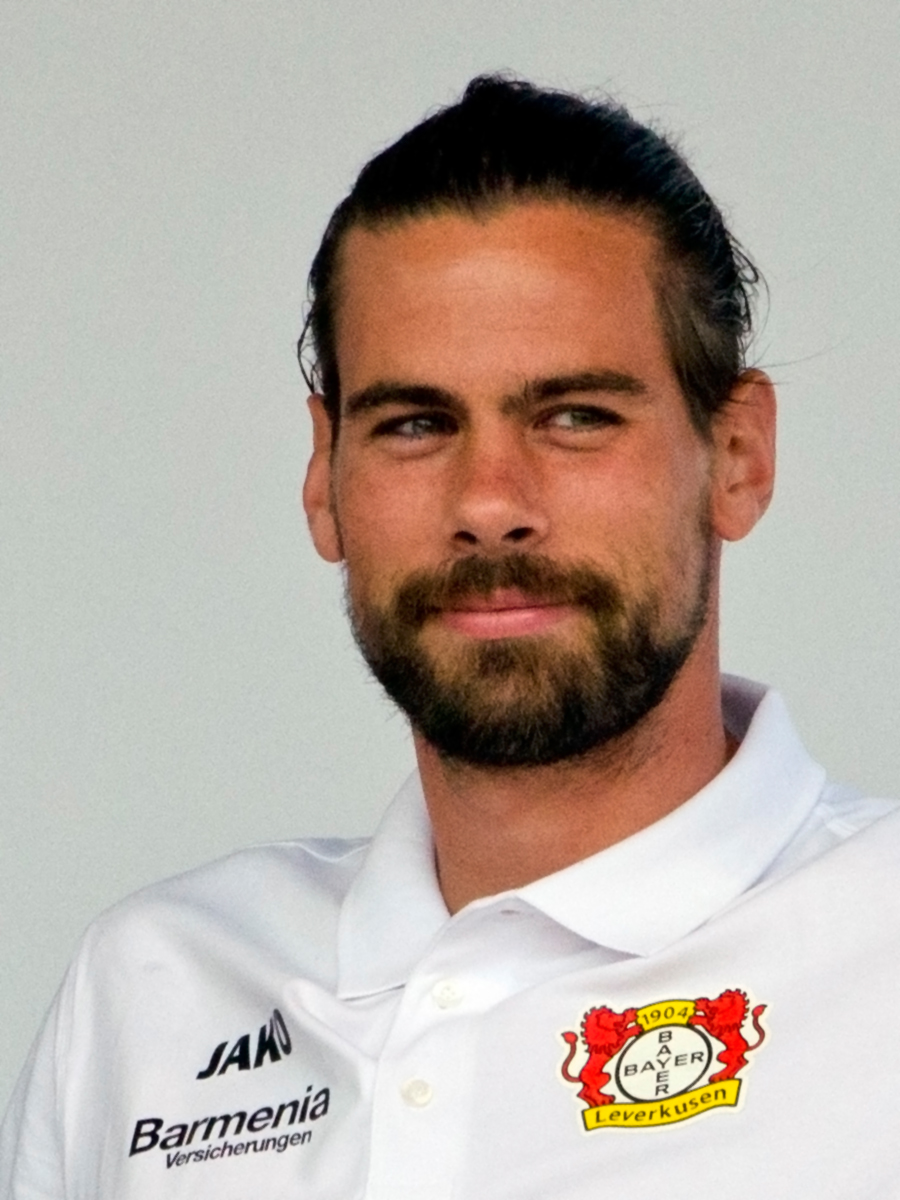
- Kirschbaum in 2018

Personal information
- Date of birth: 20 April 1987 (age 39)
- Place of birth: Würzburg, West Germany
- Height: 1.94 m (6 ft 4 in)
- Position: Goalkeeper

Youth career
- TSV Obernzenn
- 1999–2004: 1. FC Nürnberg
- 2004–2006: 1899 Hoffenheim

Senior career*
Years	Team	Apps	(Gls)
2006–2008	1899 Hoffenheim II	28	(0)
2006–2009	1899 Hoffenheim	10	(0)
2009	FC Vaduz	16	(0)
2009–2010	SV Sandhausen	20	(0)
2010–2013	Energie Cottbus	91	(0)
2013–2015	VfB Stuttgart	9	(0)
2015–2018	1. FC Nürnberg	46	(0)
2018–2019	Bayer Leverkusen	0	(0)
2019–2021	VVV-Venlo	55	(0)
2021–2023	Jahn Regensburg	6	(0)
Total		281	(0)

International career
2006	Germany U19	6	(0)
2007	Germany U20	3	(0)
2007–2008	Germany U21	7	(0)
- * Club domestic league appearances and goals as of 4 July 2023

Thorsten Kirschbaum (born 20 April 1987) is a German professional footballer who plays as a goalkeeper.

== Club career ==
Kirschbaum was a member of the team of 1899 Hoffenheim that won promotion to the 2. Bundesliga. On 10 January 2009, he moved from 1899 Hoffenheim to Liechtenstein to play for FC Vaduz of the Swiss Super League and was released on 30 June 2009. After one year he left SV Sandhausen and signed a three-year contract for Energie Cottbus.

After the end of his contract with Cottbus on 1 July 2013, Kirschbaum moved to VfB Stuttgart on a free transfer. On 10 March 2013, he signed a contract until June 2016 with VfB Stuttgart.

On 1 July 2015, Kirschbaum moved to 1. FC Nürnberg.

On 27 May 2019, Kirschbaum joined VVV-Venlo on a free transfer.

In summer 2021, he moved to Jahn Regensburg.

== International career ==
Kirschbaum has made seven appearances for the Germany U-21.

== Career statistics ==
Appearances and goals by club, season and competition
Club	Season	League			Cup		Continental		Total	
Club	Season	Division	Apps	Goals	Apps	Goals	Apps	Goals	Apps	Goals
1899 Hoffenheim	2006–07	Regionalliga Süd	9	0	—		—		9	0
1899 Hoffenheim	2007–08	2. Bundesliga	1	0	—		—		1	0
1899 Hoffenheim	Total		10	0	—		—		10	0
1899 Hoffenheim II	2006–07	Oberliga Baden-Württemberg	12	0	—		—		12	0
1899 Hoffenheim II	2007–08	Oberliga Baden-Württemberg	14	0	—		—		14	0
1899 Hoffenheim II	Total		26	0	—		—		26	0
FC Vaduz	2008–09	Swiss Super League	16	0	0	0	—		16	0
SV Sandhausen	2009–10	3. Liga	20	0	—		—		20	0
Energie Cottbus	2010–11	2. Bundesliga	32	0	5	0	—		37	0
Energie Cottbus	2011–12	2. Bundesliga	27	0	0	0	—		27	0
Energie Cottbus	2012–13	2. Bundesliga	32	0	1	0	—		33	0
Energie Cottbus	Total		91	0	6	0	—		97	0
VfB Stuttgart	2013–14	Bundesliga	3	0	1	0	—		4	0
VfB Stuttgart	2014–15	Bundesliga	6	0	0	0	—		6	0
VfB Stuttgart	Total		9	0	1	0	—		10	0
1. FC Nürnberg II	2015–16	Regionalliga Bayern	2	0	—		—		2	0
1. FC Nürnberg	2015–16	2. Bundesliga	12	0	2	0	—		14	0
1. FC Nürnberg	2016–17	2. Bundesliga	22	0	1	0	—		23	0
1. FC Nürnberg	2017–18	2. Bundesliga	12	0	2	0	—		14	0
1. FC Nürnberg	Total		46	0	5	0	—		51	0
Bayer Leverkusen	2018–19	Bundesliga	0	0	0	0	1 (Note: Appearance in the UEFA Europa League)	0	1	0
VVV-Venlo	2019–20	Eredivisie	26	0	0	0	—		26	0
VVV-Venlo	2020–21	Eredivisie	29	0	2	0	—		31	0
VVV-Venlo	Total		55	0	2	0	—		57	0
Jahn Regensburg	2021–22	2. Bundesliga	3	0	0	0	—		3	0
Jahn Regensburg	2022–23	2. Bundesliga	3	0	0	0	—		3	0
Jahn Regensburg	Total		6	0	0	0	—		6	0
Career total			281	0	14	0	1	0	296	0

== Honours ==
Individual

- Eredivisie Player of the Month: February 2020
