= Vito van Crooij =

Dutch footballer (born 1996)

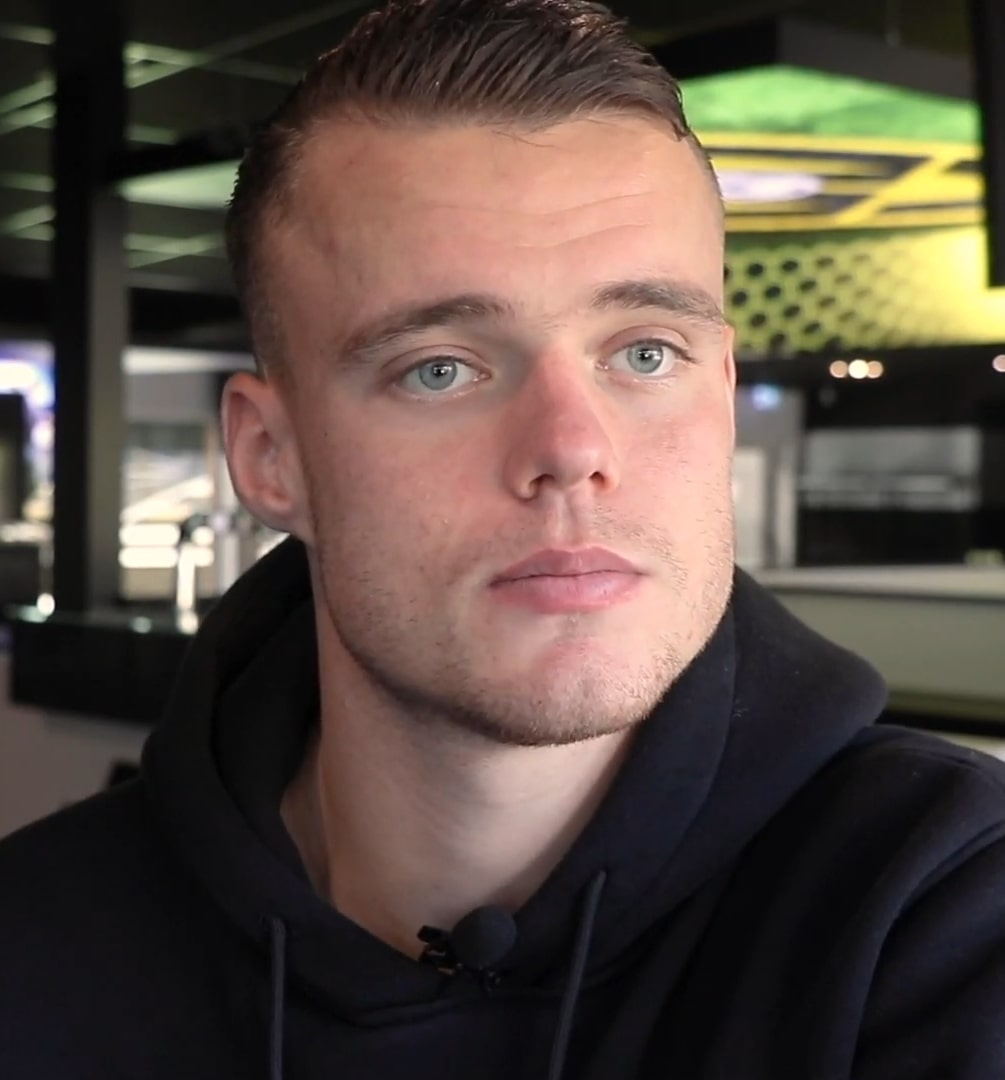
- van Crooij in 2020

Personal information
- Full name: Vito van Crooij
- Date of birth: 29 January 1996 (age 30)
- Place of birth: Venlo, Netherlands
- Height: 1.79 m (5 ft 10 in)
- Position: Winger

Team information
- Current team: Willem II
- Number: 32

Youth career
- Quick Boys '31
- 2004–2013: VVV

Senior career*
Years	Team	Apps	(Gls)
2013–2018	VVV	132	(35)
2018–2020	PEC Zwolle	46	(9)
2020–2021	VVV	31	(3)
2021–2023	Sparta	74	(19)
2023–2024	Al-Wehda	24	(0)
2024–2026	NEC	33	(10)
2026	→ Sparta (loan)	10	(0)
2026–	Willem II	2	(0)

International career
2015-2016	Netherlands U20	6	(0)
2016	Netherlands U21	1	(0)
- * Club domestic league appearances and goals as of 11 October 2026

Vito van Crooij (born 29 January 1996) is a Dutch professional footballer who plays as a winger for Eredivisie club Willem II. He won the Eerste Divisie Young Player of the Year in 2016 for his performances for VVV-Venlo.

His brother, Delano van Crooij plays professionally as a goalkeeper.

== Club career ==
Born in Venlo, van Crooij made his debut for VVV-Venlo at the age of 18 in the KNVB Cup against Eindhoven at the start of the 2014–15 Season, however he did not score until the game against MVV in the KNVB Cup, scoring once in the 2–0 victory. His first league game in the Eerste Divisie was in the 3–0 victory against Achilles '29. However, Van Crooy did not score a league goal until February, netting the winner in the 1–0 victory against Almere City.

In the 2015–16 season, van Crooij was part of the VVV-Venlo squad which finished second in the Eerste Divisie. He scored 13 goals and recorded 8 assists throughout the season playing as a left winger. He was part of the VVV-Venlo team which lost in the play off final of the Eerste Divisie. He just missed out on the Eerste Divisie Young Player of the Year Award for the 2015–16 season where he was nominated due to his impressive performances for VVV.

In the 2016–17 season, van Crooij started the season well, scoring the equaliser in the 2–1 victory over SC Cambuur. Since then he has scored more goals, including a penalty in the 2–1 defeat to Helmond Sport.

On 13 July 2018, he became a new PEC Zwolle player.

On 25 August 2020, he returned to VVV-Venlo.

On 25 June 2021, Van Crooij signed a three-year contract with Sparta Rotterdam. On 14 August 2022, he scored the fastest goal in Eredivisie history – after eight seconds against AZ Alkmaar.

On 7 September 2023, van Crooij joined Saudi Pro League club Al-Wehda on a three-year deal.

On 30 September 2024, van Crooij signed a three-season contract with NEC. On 9 January 2026, Van Crooij returned to Sparta Rotterdam on a six-month loan.

On 1 September 2026, van Crooij moved to Willem II for one season, with an option for a second.

== International career ==
Van Crooij played 6 games for the Netherlands national under-20 football team and one for the U21s.

== Career statistics ==
As of match played 17 May 2026

Appearances and goals by club, season and competition
Club	Season	League			National cup		Europe		Other		Total	
Club	Season	Division	Apps	Goals	Apps	Goals	Apps	Goals	Apps	Goals	Apps	Goals
VVV-Venlo	2013–14	Eerste Divisie	1	0	0	0	—		0	0	1	0
VVV-Venlo	2014–15	Eerste Divisie	31	3	3	1	—		4 (Note: Appearances in Eerste Divisie playoffs)	1	38	5
VVV-Venlo	2015–16	Eerste Divisie	33	13	1	1	—		2	0	34	14
VVV-Venlo	2016–17	Eerste Divisie	36	14	2	0	—		—		38	14
VVV-Venlo	2017–18	Eredivisie	31	5	2	0	—		—		33	5
VVV-Venlo	Total		132	35	8	2	—		6	1	144	38
PEC Zwolle	2018–19	Eredivisie	30	9	2	1	—		—		32	10
PEC Zwolle	2019–20	Eredivisie	16	0	2	0	—		5	4	18	0
PEC Zwolle	Total		46	9	4	1	—		5	4	50	10
VVV-Venlo	2020–21	Eredivisie	31	3	4	1	—		—		35	4
Sparta Rotterdam	2021–22	Eredivisie	33	5	2	2	—		—		35	7
Sparta Rotterdam	2022–23	Eredivisie	34	12	2	0	—		0	0	36	12
Sparta Rotterdam	2023–24	Eredivisie	3	0	0	0	—		0	0	3	0
Sparta Rotterdam	Total		70	17	4	2	—		0	0	74	19
Al-Wehda	2023–24	Pro League	23	0	1	0	—		1 (Note: Appearance in Saudi Super Cup)	0	25	0
Al-Wehda	2024–25	Pro League	1	0	0	0	—		—		1	0
Al-Wehda	Total		24	0	1	0	—		1	0	26	0
NEC	2024–25	Eredivisie	25	9	2	0	—		1 (Note: Appearance in European play-offs)	1	28	10
NEC	2025–26	Eredivisie	8	1	2	0	—		—		10	1
NEC	Total		33	10	4	0	—		1	1	38	11
Sparta Rotterdam (loan)	2025–26	Eredivisie	8	0	—		—		—		8	0
Career total			328	74	23	2	0	0	13	6	357	82

== Honours ==
VVV-Venlo

- Eerste Divisie: 2016–17,

Individual

- Eredivisie Team of the Month: March 2023, January 2025
