= Jessy Hendrikx =

Dutch association football player

Personal information
- Date of birth: 25 January 2002 (age 24)
- Place of birth: Blerick, Netherlands
- Height: 1.93 m (6 ft 4 in)
- Position: Forward

Team information
- Current team: Turkse Rangers
- Number: 77

Youth career
- –2012: HBSV
- 2012–2020: VVV-Venlo

Senior career*
| Years | Team | Apps | (Gls) |
| 2020–2021 | VVV-Venlo | 0 | (0) |
| 2020–2021 | → Helmond Sport (loan) | 13 | (0) |
| 2021–2022 | Helmond Sport | 17 | (0) |
| 2022–2024 | KFC Esperanza Pelt | 35 | (5) |
| 2024– | Turkse Rangers | | |
- * Club domestic league appearances and goals as of 15 January 2026

Jessy Hendrikx (born 25 January 2002) is a Dutch footballer who plays as a forward for Turkse Rangers.

== Career ==
Born in Blerick, Limburg, Hendrikx started playing football for HBSV before joining the VVV-Venlo academy. He was promoted to the first team in June 2020. In November 2020, before making his professional debut for VVV, he was sent on loan to Helmond Sport for the remained of the 2020–21 season. He made his debut on 4 December 2020 in a 2–0 loss to Go Ahead Eagles in the Eerste Divisie, coming on for Gaétan Bosiers in the 72nd minute.

Ahead of the 2021–22 season, Hendrikx signed a permanent contract with Helmond Sport.

In June 2022, Hendrikx signed with the fifth-tier Belgian Division 3 club Esperanza Pelt.

== Career statistics ==
As of 19 January 2022

Appearances and goals by club, season and competition
| Club | Season | League | | | Cup | | Other | | Total | |
| Club | Season | Division | Apps | Goals | Apps | Goals | Apps | Goals | Apps | Goals |
|---|---|---|---|---|---|---|---|---|---|---|
| Helmond Sport (loan) | 2020–21 | Eerste Divisie | 13 | 0 | 0 | 0 | — | | 13 | 0 |
| Helmond Sport | 2021–22 | Eerste Divisie | 11 | 0 | 1 | 0 | — | | 12 | 0 |
| Career total | | | 24 | 0 | 1 | 0 | 0 | 0 | 25 | 0 |
