= Evert Linthorst =

Dutch footballer (born 2000)

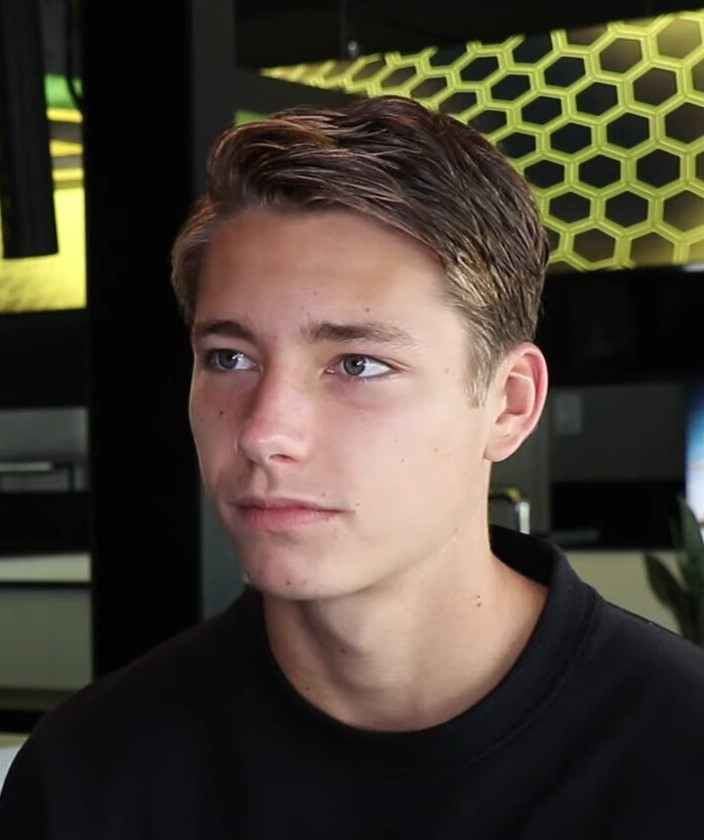
- Linthorst in 2019

Personal information
- Full name: Henricus Gerardus Hubertus Maria Linthorst
- Date of birth: 3 March 2000 (age 26)
- Place of birth: Venlo, Netherlands
- Height: 1.87 m (6 ft 2 in)
- Position: Midfielder

Team information
- Current team: Go Ahead Eagles
- Number: 8

Youth career
- 2013-2017: PSV Eindhoven
- 2017-2018: VVV Venlo

Senior career*
Years	Team	Apps	(Gls)
2018–2021	VVV-Venlo	48	(6)
2021–2022	Ittihad Kalba	14	(0)
2022–	Go Ahead Eagles	128	(7)
- * Club domestic league appearances and goals as of 23 October 2026

Henricus Gerardus Hubertus Maria "Evert" Linthorst (born 3 March 2000) is a Dutch professional footballer who plays as a midfielder for Eredivisie club Go Ahead Eagles.

== Club career ==
=== VVV ===
Born and raised in Venlo, he opted to join his hometown club VVV Venlo in 2017 after spending four years previously in the football academy of PSV Eindhoven. He plays as a central midfielder. Linthorst made his Eredivisie debut for VVV Venlo against AFC Ajax on 19 April 2018. On 17 August 2019, he scored his first league goal for the club, grabbing a late consolation in a 4–1 defeat against Ajax.

=== Al Ittihad Kalba ===
On 1 February 2021, he signed with Al Ittihad Kalba, based in the city of Kalba, in the Emirate of Sharjah in the United Arab Emirates (UAE), and who play in the UAE Pro League. He made his debut in the Pro League against Ajman Club on 5 February 2021 appearing as a late substitute in a 2–1 home win for his new club.

=== Go Ahead Eagles ===
On 30 January 2022, Linthorst signed a two and-a-half year contract with Dutch side Go Ahead Eagles keeping him at the club until the summer of 2024. He made his debut for Go Ahead Eagles as a late substitute in the Eredivisie in a 2–1 win over Ajax on 27 February 2022. He scored his first goal for the club on 19 April 2023 against RKC Waalwijk, netting his side's first goal in a 3–2 home victory in the Eredivisie. In October 2023, he signed a one-year contract extension with the club, with the option of an additional season.

He played as the club won the 2025 KNVB Cup final in Rotterdam in a penalty shoot-out against AZ Alkmaar.

== Career statistics ==
As of match played 27 October 2026

Appearances and goals by club, season and competition
Club	Season	League			National cup (Note: Includes KNVB Cup, UAE President's Cup)		League cup (Note: Includes UAE League Cup)		Continental		Other		Total	
Club	Season	Division	Apps	Goals	Apps	Goals	Apps	Goals	Apps	Goals	Apps	Goals	Apps	Goals
VVV-Venlo	2017–18	Eredivisie	1	0	—		—		—		—		1	0
VVV-Venlo	2018–19	Eredivisie	13	0	0	0	—		—		—		13	0
VVV-Venlo	2019–20	Eredivisie	18	4	1	0	—		—		—		19	4
VVV-Venlo	2020–21	Eredivisie	16	2	3	1	—		—		—		19	3
VVV-Venlo	Total		48	6	4	1	—		—		—		52	7
Ittihad Kalba	2020–21	UAE Pro League	8	0	—		2	0	—		—		10	0
Ittihad Kalba	2021–22	UAE Pro League	6	0	1	0	1	0	—		—		8	0
Ittihad Kalba	Total		14	0	1	0	3	0	—		—		18	0
Go Ahead Eagles	2021–22	Eredivisie	2	0	0	0	—		—		—		2	0
Go Ahead Eagles	2022–23	Eredivisie	23	1	1	0	—		—		—		24	1
Go Ahead Eagles	2023–24	Eredivisie	31	1	3	0	—		—		2 (Note: Appearances in European play-offs)	0	36	1
Go Ahead Eagles	2024–25	Eredivisie	33	3	5	0	—		2 (Note: Appearances in UEFA Conference League)	0	—		40	3
Go Ahead Eagles	2025–26	Eredivisie	29	1	3	0	—		7 (Note: Appearances in UEFA Europa League)	0	1 (Note: Appearance in Johan Cruyff Shield)	0	40	1
Go Ahead Eagles	2026–27	Eredivisie	10	1	1	0	—		—		—		11	1
Go Ahead Eagles	Total		128	7	13	0	—		9	0	3	0	153	7
Career total			190	13	18	1	3	0	9	0	3	0	223	14

== Honours ==
Go Ahead Eagles

- KNVB Cup: 2024–25
