= Anastasios Donis =

Greek footballer (born 1996)

Tasos Donis
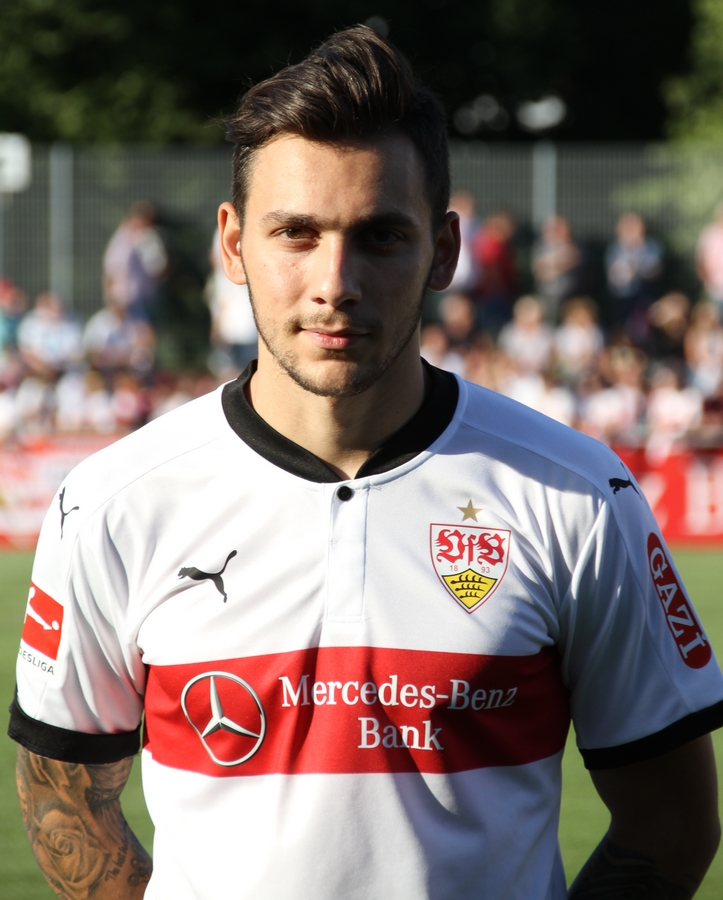
- Donis playing for VfB Stuttgart in 2017

Personal information
- Full name: Anastasios Donis
- Date of birth: 29 August 1996 (age 30)
- Place of birth: Blackburn, England
- Height: 1.78 m (5 ft 10 in)
- Position: Forward

Team information
- Current team: Radomiak Radom
- Number: 22

Youth career
- 2000–2013: Panathinaikos
- 2013–2015: Juventus
- 2015: → Sassuolo (loan)

Senior career*
Years	Team	Apps	(Gls)
2015–2017	Juventus	0	(0)
2015–2016	→ Lugano (loan)	25	(4)
2016–2017	→ Nice (loan)	18	(5)
2017–2020	VfB Stuttgart	45	(7)
2019–2020	→ Reims (loan)	15	(0)
2020–2023	Reims	15	(0)
2021	→ VVV-Venlo (loan)	5	(0)
2022–2023	→ APOEL (loan)	16	(5)
2023–2025	APOEL	45	(6)
2025–2026	Aris	12	(1)
2026–	Radomiak Radom	0	(0)

International career
2013–2015	Greece U19	13	(2)
2015–2017	Greece U21	7	(1)
2017–2019	Greece	11	(1)
- * Club domestic league appearances and goals as of 19 April 2026

Anastasios "Tasos" Donis (Greek: Αναστάσιος "Τάσος" Δώνης; born 29 August 1996) is a Greek professional footballer who plays as a forward for Ekstraklasa club Radomiak Radom.

== Club career ==
=== Youth career ===
In January 2013, Donis moved from Panathinaikos to Juventus for €300,000. The move was completed in May 2012, where he signed a three–year professional contract.

He became a star in the Primavera in Turin, scoring 17 goals in 45 games in both Campionato Nazionale Primavera and UEFA Youth League. This included scoring a hat–trick against Spezia U19 on 25 January 2014. He also scored twice on two occasions against Siena U19 and Cesena U19.

==== Sassuolo (loan) ====
On 2 February 2015, Donis joined Serie A side Sassuolo on loan for the remainder of the 2014–15 season. However, he made no appearances for Sassuolo, as he was sidelined, due to being on the substitute bench and his own injury concerns.

==== Lugano (loan) ====
In summer 2015, Donis joined Lugano for the 2015–16 season.

However, he suffered an injury that saw him miss the start of the season. He didn't make his debut until on 13 September 2015, where he came on as a substitute for Domagoj Pušić, in a 3–0 loss against FC Sion. Six days later, Donis scored his first goal for the club, in the second round of Swiss Cup, in a 3–2 win over AC Bellinzona after the game went extra time.

On 2 March 2016, he scored twice against FC Luzern to help his side progress to the final of the Swiss Cup for the first time in 23 years. He went on to score four goals in the competition; this includes scoring twice against FC Thun on 17 April 2016 and then netted the last goal on 25 May 2016 to seal the victory against St.Gallen on the last matchday of the season, helping his club avoid relegation. On 29 May 2016, Lugano lost 1–0 against relegated FC Zürich in the final of the Swiss Cup. Despite being sidelined on three more occasions later in the season, He ended his loan to Lugano with 8 goals and 7 assists in 29 appearances across all competitions.

==== OGC Nice (loan) ====
On 20 July 2016, Ligue 1 club OGC Nice officially announced that Donis had joined them on loan from Juventus. Nice had an option to buy him at the end of the season.

On 14 August 2016, matchday 1 of the 2016–17 Ligue 1 season, he made his debut for Nice as a substitute in a 1–0 win against Rennes. On 3 November 2016, he made his international club debut appearing as a substitute late in the match in a 2–0 home loss against FC Red Bull Salzburg in a 2016–17 UEFA Europa League group stage match.

Donis played a total of just 79 minutes in Ligue 1 before 12 February 2017 with all of them coming as substitute appearances. On 12 February, he replaced the injured Alassane Pléa in the 43rd minute with Nice losing 2–0 against Rennes and scored In the 59th minute contributing to a 2–2 draw. On 10 March 2017, he came on as a substitute and scored the leveller in the 77th minute of a league home game against SM Caen. Then, on 30 April 2017, he scored his fourth goal of the season, in a 3–1 win over Paris Saint-Germain, a win that saw but cost their chance of successfully defending their league title, which Monaco ultimately won. Three weeks later, on the last matchday of the season, he netted a brace in a 3–3 away draw against Olympique Lyonnais.

At the end of the season, with the club finished third place in a table, Donis finished the season, making twenty–two appearances and scoring five times in all competitions. Despite keen on staying at Nice for another season, Nice chose not to exercise their option to sign Donis for €2 million.

=== VfB Stuttgart ===
On 1 July 2017, Donis moved to VfB Stuttgart and signed a four-year-contract. Media estimated the transfer fee paid to Juventus is set at €4.2 million, while his former club Juventus will keep a future 20% resale rate, while the release clause of his contract set to €23 million.

On 13 August 2017, he made his debut with the club as a substitute in an away DFB Pokal game against FC Energie Cottbus. On 13 October 2017, Donis scored his first goal in Bundesliga, giving his club a half-time lead to a 2–1 home win game against 1. FC Köln. On 18 October 2017, Donis dislocated his shoulder in training and will miss between five and six weeks, the club confirmed. Stuttgart announced that despite the injury, 21-year-old Donis will not undergo an operation and will instead go through a normal rehabilitation process. On 13 December 2017, in his return to the squad, Donis had a muscular reaction in the first half of an away game against TSG 1899 Hoffenheim that will probably keep him out of action between two and three weeks. He then returned to the first team from injury on 13 January 2018, where he started and played 58 minutes before being substituted, in a 1–0 win over Hertha BSC. For the rest of the 2017–18 season, Donis spent most of the time on the substitute bench. On 12 May 2018, he scored and gave an assist as Stuttgart won 4–1 on the final day of 2017–18 Bundesliga season to end Bayern's 37-game unbeaten home run in the Bundesliga. At the end of the 2017–18 season, Donis finished his first season at VfB Stuttgart, making nineteen appearances and scoring two times in all competitions.

Ahead of the 2018–19 season, it was announced that Donis was going to stay at VfB Stuttgart for another season. His first appearance of the season came on 18 August 2018, where he came on as a substitute, in a 2–0 loss against Hansa Rostock. He soon found himself behind the pecking order in the first team at VfB Stuttgart at the start of the season. On 29 September 2018, he scored his first goal in the season in a 2–1 home win game against SV Werder Bremen as he raced past the static visiting defence Miloš Veljković, charged beyond onrushing goalkeeper Jiří Pavlenka and scored in an empty net. On 1 December 2018, he scored the only goal as Santiago Ascacíbar right out to Andreas Beck, whose cross pass takes Donis directly and hits by low shot from 16 meters into the left corner, sealing a 1–0 home win game against FC Augsburg. On 27 January 2019, he levelled the score with a fine strike, who placed the ball like a postage stamp in the top right-hand corner of Manuel Neuer's goal, but his club could not avoid a 4–1 away loss against champions Bayern Munich. On 27 April 2019, he scored the only goal in a 1–0 home win game against Borussia Mönchengladbach in his club effort to avoid relegation. Donis scored his fourth goal of the season, twice as many as in the previous season. Donis scored five of his six Bundesliga goals for a lead. On 11 May 2019, he scored his fifth goal in the season, as he shot from an acute angle technically demanding in the far corner giving a two goals' lead in a 3–0 win home game against VfL Wolfsburg.

=== Stade de Reims ===
On 2 September 2019, Donis was loaned out to Stade de Reims until the end of the season. He would move permanently to Reims if the club avoided relegation with a compulsory purchase option of €8 million for the summer of 2020. At the end of the season, he signed a four-year contract with a transfer fee of €4 million.

==== Loan to VVV-Venlo ====
On 1 February 2021, Donis moved to Eredivisie club VVV-Venlo, on a loan deal until the end of the season.

==== Loan to APOEL ====
On 31 August 2022, Donis moved to Cypriot First Division club APOEL, on a loan deal until the end of the season. On 19 July 2023, he signed a one-plus-one-year contract with the Cypriot club.

== International career ==
Donis has represented Greece on multiple levels. He would also be eligible to play for England through birth but opted to play for Greece instead.

=== Youth ===
In October 2013, Donis was called up to the Greece U19 for the first time. He made his Greece U19 debut, where he started the match before coming off in the first half, as they lose 3–0 to Austria U19 on 16 October 2013. A month later, he scored two goals between 14 November 2013 and 17 November 2013 against Bulgaria U19 and Over the next two years, playing for the U19 side, Donis went on to make thirteen appearances and scoring two times.

In March 2016, Donis was called up for the Greece U21 for the first time. He made his Greece U21 debut on 24 March 2016 against Albania U21, starting the whole game, in a 0–0 draw. Seven months later, on 10 October 2016, he scored his first Greece U21 goal, in a 3–1 win over Hungary U21.

=== Senior ===
On 1 June 2017 he was called up in Greece national squad for the fixture against Bosnia and Herzegovina. On 9 June 2017, he made his debut for Greece as he came on as a substitution for injured Tasos Bakasetas, in a 0–0 draw. Two months later, on 31 August 2017, Donis made his first start for the national team and played the whole game, in a 0–0 draw against Estonia. On 21 March 2019, he was subbed on for the injured Kostas Mitroglou and scored his first goal with Greece senior team in a 2–0 UEFA Euro 2020 qualifying away match against Liechtenstein.

== Personal life ==
Donis comes from a family of footballers. His father, Georgios, was a professional footballer and Greece international, while his older brother, Christos, has played for Panathinaikos and Radomiak Radom among others. Both Christos and Anastasios played together when they were at Lugano and Radomiak.

Anastasios, nicknamed "Tasos", was born in Blackburn during his father's time at Blackburn Rovers. Because he was born in England, Donis has a British passport. In addition to speaking Greek, Donis also speaks Italian, which he learned from his time at Juventus.

== Career statistics ==
=== Club ===
As of match played 19 April 2026

Club	Season	League			National cup (Note: Includes Swiss Cup, DFB-Pokal, Coupe de France, KNVB Cup, Cypriot Cup, Greek Football Cup)		Continental		Total	
Club	Season	Division	Apps	Goals	Apps	Goals	Apps	Goals	Apps	Goals
Lugano (loan)	2015–16	Swiss Super League	25	4	4	4	—		29	8
Nice (loan)	2016–17	Ligue 1	18	5	1	0	3 (Note: Appearance(s) in UEFA Europa League)	0	22	5
Stuttgart	2017–18	Bundesliga	18	2	1	0	—		19	2
Stuttgart	2018–19	Bundesliga	26	5	1	0	—		27	5
Stuttgart	2019–20	2. Bundesliga	1	0	0	0	—		1	0
Stuttgart	Total		45	7	2	0	—		47	7
Stade de Reims (loan)	2019–20	Ligue 1	15	0	1	0	—		16	0
Stade de Reims	2020–21	Ligue 1	3	0	0	0	1	0	4	0
Stade de Reims	2021–22	Ligue 1	13	0	1	0	—		14	0
Stade de Reims	Total		31	0	2	0	1	0	34	0
VVV-Venlo (loan)	2020–21	Eredivisie	5	0	1	0	—		6	0
APOEL (loan)	2022–23	Cypriot First Division	16	5	1	0	—		17	5
APOEL	2023–24	Cypriot First Division	27	2	0	0	—		27	2
APOEL	2024–25	Cypriot First Division	18	4	2	1	11 (Note: Four appearances in UEFA Champions League, two appearances and one goal in UEFA Europa League, five appearances and two goals in UEFA Conference League)	3	31	8
APOEL	Total		45	6	2	1	11	3	58	10
Aris	2025–26	Super League Greece	12	1	2	0	—		14	1
Radomiak Radom	2026–27	Ekstraklasa	0	0	0	0	—		0	0
Career total			197	28	16	5	15	3	223	35

=== International ===
Appearances and goals by national team and year
National team	Year	Apps	Goals
Greece
Greece	2017	4	0
Greece	2018	3	0
Greece	2019	4	1
Total		11	1

Scores and results list Greece's goal tally first, score column indicates score after each Donis goal.

List of international goals scored by Anastasios Donis
No.	Date	Venue	Opponent	Score	Result	Competition
1	23 March 2019	Rheinpark Stadion, Vaduz, Liechtenstein	Liechtenstein	2–0	2–0	UEFA Euro 2020 qualifying

== Honours ==
Juventus Primavera

- Supercoppa Primavera: 2013

APOEL

- Cypriot First Division: 2023–24
