= Christos Donis =

Greek footballer (born 1994)

Personal information
- Date of birth: 9 October 1994 (age 32)
- Place of birth: Athens, Greece
- Height: 1.84 m (6 ft 0 in)
- Position: Midfielder

Team information
- Current team: Radomiak Radom
- Number: 77

Youth career
- 2008–2012: Panathinaikos

Senior career*
Years	Team	Apps	(Gls)
2012–2020	Panathinaikos	104	(4)
2015–2016	→ Lugano (loan)	1	(0)
2016–2017	→ PAS Giannina (loan)	3	(0)
2017	→ Iraklis (loan)	15	(4)
2020–2022	Ascoli	5	(0)
2021	→ VVV-Venlo (loan)	9	(1)
2023–	Radomiak Radom	104	(3)

International career
2011–2012	Greece U18	3	(1)
2012–2013	Greece U19	9	(2)
2015	Greece U21	3	(0)
- * Club domestic league appearances and goals as of 23:49, 3 November 2026 (UTC)

Christos Donis (Greek: Χρήστος Δώνης, born 9 October 1994) is a Greek professional footballer who plays as a midfielder for Ekstraklasa club Radomiak Radom.

== Career ==
=== Panathinaikos ===
Donis is a product of Panathinaikos' youth ranks. He promoted to the first team on July 1, 2012, signing a contract which keeps him in Panathinaikos until 2015. He made his debut at the 4–0 win against Proodeftiki for the Greek Cup. He made his championship debut at a game against Levadiakos on 18 December 2013, scoring his first goal with the team.

On 15 February 2016, Panathinaikos officially announced the loan of Christos Donis to Swiss club Lugano until the end of the season, with a contract option to purchase him. The 21-year-old midfielder wοuld have his younger brother, Tasos (who joined Zdeněk Zeman’s team on loan from Juventus), as a teammate. On 27 June 2016, after an unsuccessful semester with Lugano, his club officially announced his loan to the Super League club PAS Giannina until the end of the 2016–17 season. On 29 November 2016, he scored the only goal in a 1–0 away Greek Cup win against Agrotikos Asteras, helping his club to proceed to the last 16. In January 2017 he was transferred to Iraklis, on loan. On 5 April 2017, he was the only scorer in a crucial 1–0 home win game against Levadiakos, sealing a crucial victory in his club effort to avoid relegation. On 9 April 2017, he scored for a consecutive game sealing a valuable 2–1 away win against his former club PAS Giannina in his club's constant effort to avoid relegation. On 30 April 2017, he helped his club to sealing a 2–2 away draw against Asteras Tripolis, with a wonderful free kick, concluded his exceptional performance in the second half of the 2016–17 season.

Donis returned to Panathinaikos for the 2017–18 season. On 21 January 2018, he opened the score in a hammering 4–0 home win game against Kerkyra. It was his first goal with the club after almost four years. On 6 April 2019, he scored his first goal for the 2018–19 season was in the right place at the right time to convert an excellent pass from Italian striker Federico Macheda, as Panathinaikos moved to within five points of fifth-placed Aris after claiming a solid 2–0 home win over the Thessaloniki club at the Olympic Stadium. On 12 January 2020, he scored his first goal for the 2019–20 season as he intercepted the ball from a poor clearance made by Panionios defence, and he surged forward before hitting a powerful diagonal shot past the goalkeeper, Jérémy Malherbe to open the score in a 3–0 home win game against Panionios.

=== Ascoli ===
On 16 September 2020, he signed a three years' contract with Italian Serie B club Ascoli, on a free transfer with annual fees at the range of €300,000. On 12 February 2022, Donis' contract with Ascoli was terminated by mutual consent.

==== VVV-Venlo ====
On 19 January 2021, he was loaned to VVV-Venlo, where he reunited with his brother Tasos.

=== Radomiak ===
On 24 January 2023, after spending most of the winter training with Polish Ekstraklasa side Radomiak Radom, Donis signed with them until the end of the season, with a two-year extension option.

== Personal life ==
Donis is the son of the former footballer and current manager Georgios, and the elder brother of Anastasios, who also plays for Radomiak.

== Career statistics ==
As of match played 23 May 2026

Appearances and goals by club, season and competition
Club	Season	League			National cup (Note: Includes Greek Football Cup, Coppa Italia, KNVB Cup, Polish Cup)		Europe		Total	
Club	Season	Division	Apps	Goals	Apps	Goals	Apps	Goals	Apps	Goals
Panathinaikos	2012–13	Super League Greece	0	0	2	0	0	0	2	0
Panathinaikos	2013–14	Super League Greece	13	1	5	1	—		18	2
Panathinaikos	2014–15	Super League Greece	21	0	5	0	7 (Note: Appearances in UEFA Europa League)	0	33	0
Panathinaikos	2017–18	Super League Greece	19	1	4	0	3	0	26	1
Panathinaikos	2018–19	Super League Greece	25	1	2	0	—		27	1
Panathinaikos	2019–20	Super League Greece	26	1	5	1	—		31	2
Panathinaikos	Total		104	4	23	2	10	0	137	6
Lugano (loan)	2015–16	Swiss Super League	1	0	0	0	—		1	0
PAS Giannina (loan)	2016–17	Super League Greece	3	0	3	1	4	0	10	1
Iraklis (loan)	2016–17	Super League Greece	15	4	0	0	—		15	4
Ascoli	2020–21	Serie B	5	0	1	0	—		6	0
Venlo (loan)	2020–21	Eredivisie	9	1	2	0	—		11	1
Radomiak Radom	2022–23	Ekstraklasa	15	0	—		—		15	0
Radomiak Radom	2023–24	Ekstraklasa	28	1	0	0	—		28	1
Radomiak Radom	2024–25	Ekstraklasa	22	0	2	0	—		24	0
Radomiak Radom	2025–26	Ekstraklasa	27	0	0	0	—		27	0
Radomiak Radom	Total		92	1	2	0	—		94	1
Career total			229	10	31	3	14	0	274	13

== Honours ==
Panathinaikos

- Greek Cup: 2013–14
