= Arjan Swinkels =

Dutch footballer

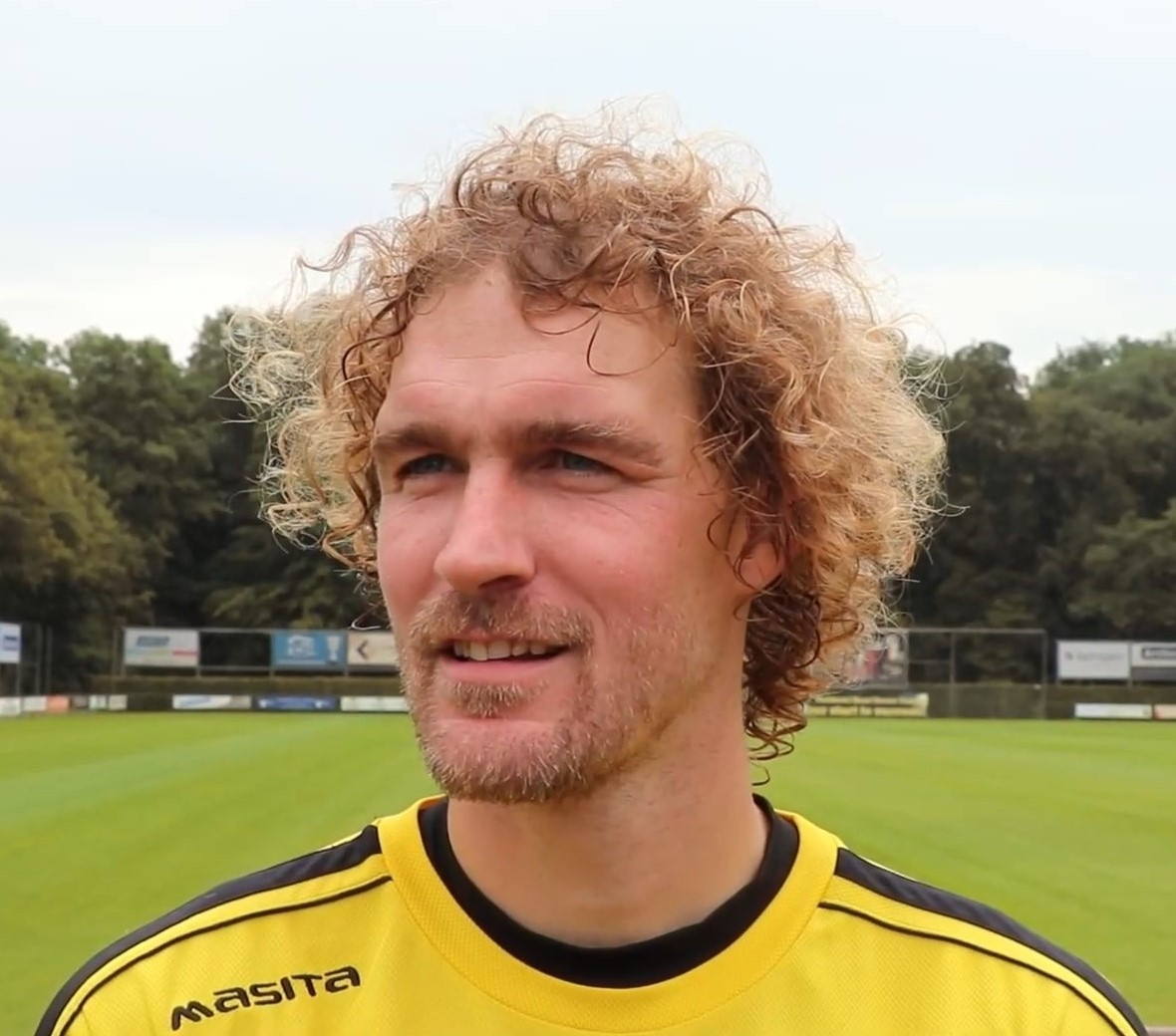
- Swinkels in 2020

Personal information
- Date of birth: 15 October 1984 (age 42)
- Place of birth: Moergestel, Netherlands
- Height: 1.84 m (6 ft 0 in)
- Position: Centre-back

Team information
- Current team: Willem II (head of youth)

Youth career
- 1990–1993: Audacia Moergestel
- 1993–2003: Willem II

Senior career*
Years	Team	Apps	(Gls)
2003–2012	Willem II	158	(13)
2012–2015	Lierse	62	(1)
2015–2016	Roda JC Kerkrade	45	(0)
2016–2018	Beerschot Wilrijk	59	(2)
2018–2020	KV Mechelen	54	(2)
2020–2021	VVV-Venlo	20	(0)
2021–2022	Esperanza Pelt		

Managerial career
- 2021–2022: Willem II (youth coach)
- 2022–: Willem II (head of youth)
- * Club domestic league appearances and goals

Arjan Swinkels (born 15 October 1984) is a Dutch retired professional footballer who played as a centre-back. He is the head of Willem II's youth department.

== Career ==
Swinkels made his Eredivisie debut against Roda JC, 18 September 2005. The following season, he was mostly on the bench, but in spring, he began playing regularly. In the last round, he saved a ball on the goalline, which meant that Willem II was safe of relegation. In the new season, Swinkels began playing as centre-back instead of injured Delano Hill. Since then, Swinkels has been a regular starter.

After signing for Lierse in the summer of 2012, Swinkels suffered a long time injury as he tore his Meniscus

On 2 February 2015, Swinkels signed until the end of the season with Dutch Eerste Divisie side Roda JC Kerkrade. With that club he forced promotion to the Eredivisie via the 2015 play-offs, at the expense of NAC Breda. A year later, he contributed to reaching 14th place.

After two seasons at Roda JC, Swinkels did not accept an offer to extend his contract with the club. Instead, he signed a contract in June 2016 until mid-2018 with Beerschot Wilrijk, who had been promoted to the Belgian National Division 1 in Belgium in the previous season. Swinkels immediately helped Beerschot Wilrijk to the Belgian First Division B. There was almost a second consecutive promotion for Swinkels with Beerschot Wilrijk, but Cercle Brugge proved too strong in the title matches. After two seasons having been named "Man of the Season" by fans, Swinkels moved to Mechelen as a free agent. In his first year in Mechelen he had a successful season, becoming champion of the Belgian First Division B and winning the Belgian Cup. His contract was not renewed at the end of his second year. The 35-year-old Swinkels returned to the Netherlands, where he signed a one-year contract with Eredivisie club VVV-Venlo with the option for another year.

=== Later career ===
On 1 September 2021, he moved to Belgian amateur club Esperanza Pelt. Two months later, on 1 November 2021, his former club Willem II confirmed, that Swinkels had been appointed youth coach at the club. In May 2022, Swinkels was appointed head of the clubs youth department, why he also had to hang up his boots as an active football player.

== Honours ==
Mechelen

- Belgian First Division B: 2018–19
- Belgian Cup: 2018–19
