= Jafar Arias =

Curaçaoan footballer (born 1995)

Personal information
- Full name: Jafar Aurelio Miguel Arias
- Date of birth: 16 June 1995 (age 31)
- Place of birth: Willemstad, Curaçao
- Height: 1.91 m (6 ft 3 in)
- Position: Forward

Team information
- Current team: Paju Frontier
- Number: 9

Youth career
- AGOVV
- Groningen

Senior career*
Years	Team	Apps	(Gls)
2014–2015	Groningen	2	(0)
2015–2018	Dordrecht	63	(13)
2018–2020	Emmen	50	(4)
2020–2021	VVV-Venlo	29	(4)
2021–2022	Argeș Pitești	16	(2)
2022–2023	Helmond Sport	24	(1)
2023	Manfredonia	0	(0)
2024–2025	HB Køge	39	(10)
2026–	Paju Frontier	4	(1)

International career^{‡}
2019–	Curaçao	13	(0)
- * Club domestic league appearances and goals as of 6 August 2026 ‡ National team caps and goals as of 21 November 2023

Jafar Aurelio Miguel Arias (born 16 June 1995) is a Curaçaoan professional footballer who plays as a forward for K League 2 club, Paju Frontier.

== Club career ==
Arias played for FC Groningen before joining Dordrecht in summer 2015.

On 29 August 2021, he signed a one-year contract with Argeș Pitești in Romania.

On 29 January 2024, Arias joined Danish 1st Division club HB Køge. He left the club in June 2025.

On 8 January 2026, Arias announce official transfer to K League 2 promoted club, Paju Frontier for 2026 season.

== International ==
He made his Curaçao national football team debut on 5 June 2019, in a 2019 King's Cup game against India, as a starter.

== Honours ==
=== International ===
Curaçao

- King's Cup: 2019
