= Steffen Schäfer =

German footballer (born 1994)

Personal information
- Date of birth: 1 May 1994 (age 32)
- Place of birth: Cologne, Germany
- Height: 1.89 m (6 ft 2 in)
- Position: Centre back

Youth career
- TSV Bayer Dormagen
- –2013: 1. FC Köln

Senior career*
Years	Team	Apps	(Gls)
2013–2014	1. FC Köln II	20	(0)
2014–2016	1. FC Saarbrücken	35	(0)
2014–2016	1. FC Saarbrücken II	2	(0)
2016–2017	FSV Frankfurt	29	(0)
2017–2019	1. FC Magdeburg	46	(0)
2019–2021	VVV-Venlo	22	(0)
2021–2022	SC Verl	15	(1)
2023	VSG Altglienicke	11	(0)
- * Club domestic league appearances and goals as of 03:31, 4 July 2024 (UTC)

Steffen Schäfer (born 1 May 1994) is a German professional footballer who most recently played as a centre-back for VSG Altglienicke.

== Club career ==
On 26 August 2021, Schäfer signed a two-year contract with 3. Liga club SC Verl.
