= Delano van Crooij =

Dutch footballer (born 1991)

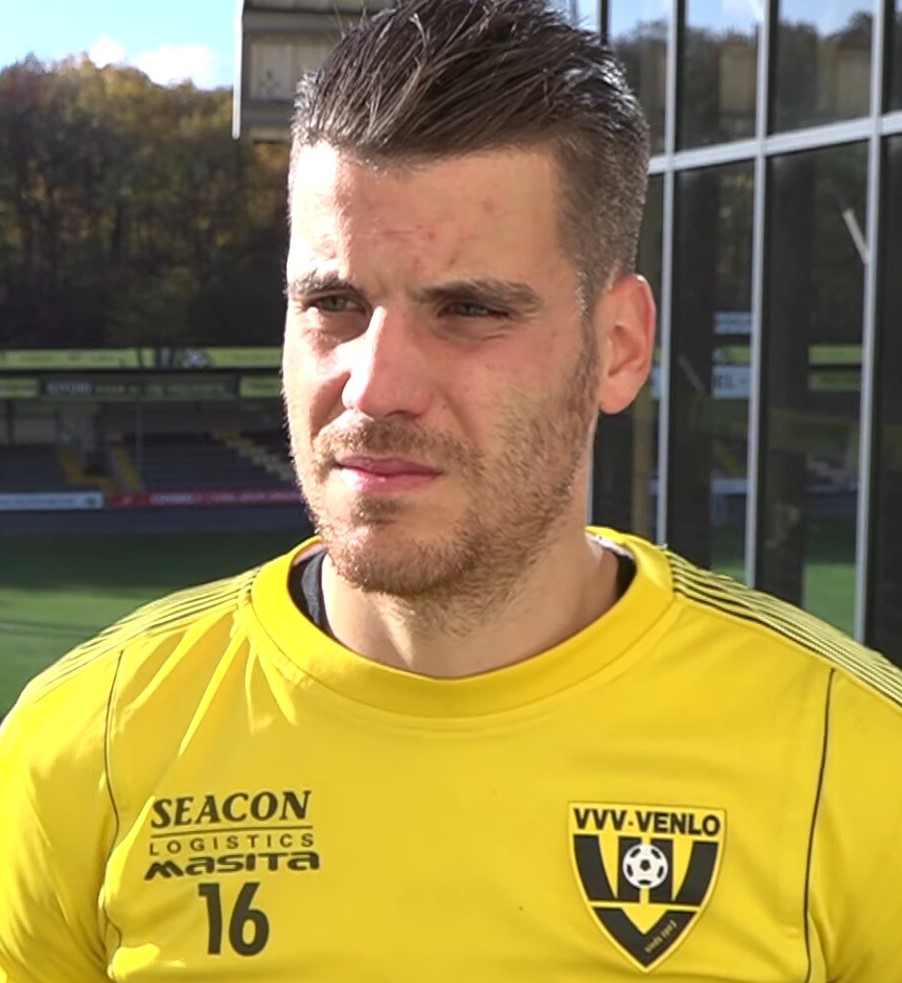
- Van Crooij in 2018

Personal information
- Date of birth: 5 June 1991 (age 35)
- Place of birth: Venlo, Netherlands
- Height: 1.85 m (6 ft 1 in)
- Position: Goalkeeper

Youth career
- -2001: Quick Boys '31
- VVV

Senior career*
Years	Team	Apps	(Gls)
2010–2011	VVV	0	(0)
2011–2012	Zwolle	0	(0)
2012–2013	Kwiek Venlo		
2013–2015	Deurne		
2015–2022	VVV	58	(0)
2022–2024	Sparta Rotterdam	0	(0)
2024	→ VVV (loan)	15	(0)
2024–2025	VVV	15	(0)
- * Club domestic league appearances and goals as of 9 May 2025

Delano van Crooij (born 5 June 1991) is a Dutch professional footballer who plays as a goalkeeper.

== Club career ==
Born in Venlo, Van Crooij started with local amateur side Quick Boys '31 and then played in the VVV-Venlo youth system and joined FC Zwolle in 2011 as their third goalkeeper. He was released by Zwolle a year later and had a trial with Bulgarian side Etar Tarnovo, while playing for amateur side Kwiek Venlo. That did not materialize and after two years at Deurne, he chose to rejoin VVV over a move to SC Gestel. On 24 October 2020, he conceded 13 goals in 13–0 loss against Ajax as VVV-Venlo's goalkeeper, which is a negative record in Holland.

On 22 September 2022, Van Crooij signed a one-season contract with Sparta Rotterdam.

On 30 January 2024, Van Crooij returned to VVV-Venlo on loan. On 18 June, the deal was made permanent as Van Crooij signed a one-year contract with the club. He joined amateur side HVV Helmond in September 2025.

== Personal life ==
He is Vito van Crooij's older brother.

== Honours ==
Zwolle

- Eerste Divisie: 2011–12

VVV-Venlo

- Eerste Divisie: 2016–17
