= Aaron Bastiaans =

Dutch professional footballer

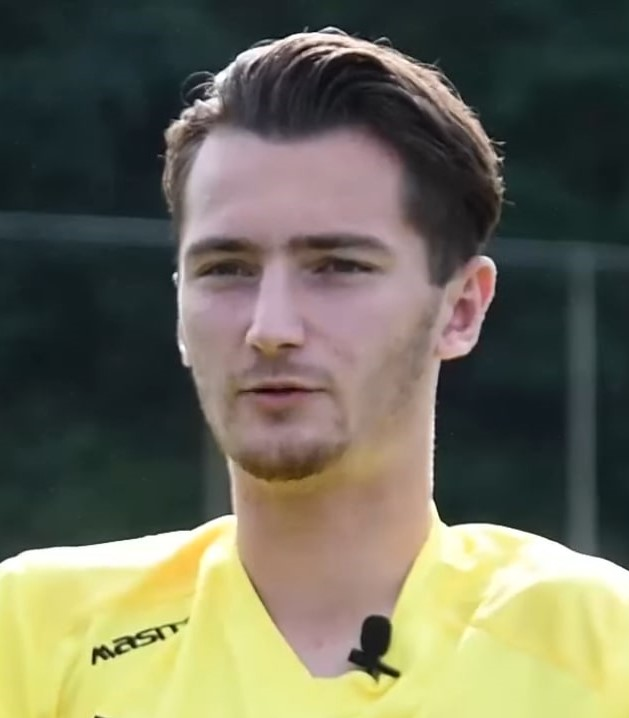
- Bastiaans in 2021

Personal information
- Date of birth: 4 April 2002 (age 24)
- Place of birth: Nederweert, Netherlands
- Height: 1.84 m (6 ft 0 in)
- Position: Midfielder

Youth career
- Merefeldia
- 2011–2019: VVV

Senior career*
Years	Team	Apps	(Gls)
2019–2022	VVV	17	(2)
2021	→ Helmond Sport (loan)	12	(0)
2022	→ Helmond Sport (loan)	7	(0)
2022	UNA	10	(0)
2023–	Merefeldia		
- * Club domestic league appearances and goals as of 21:17, 15 January 2026 (UTC)

Aaron Bastiaans (born 4 April 2002) is a Dutch footballer who plays as a midfielder.

== Professional career ==
On 18 April 2019, Bastiaans signed his first professional contract with VVV-Venlo. Bastiaans made his professional debut with VVV-Venlo in a 2-1 Eredivisie loss to PEC Zwolle on 14 December 2019, scoring his side's only goal in his debut.

On 1 February 2021, Baastians joined Helmond Sport on loan until the end of the season.

On 28 January 2022, Bastiaans returned to Helmond Sport on another loan.

On 17 August 2022, the contract between Bastiaans and VVV-Venlo was terminated by mutual consent. He then joined a fourth-tier Derde Divisie club VV UNA. In January 2023, Bastiaans rejoined boyhood club Merefeldia Nederweert.
