= Roy Gelmi =

Swiss footballer (born 1995)

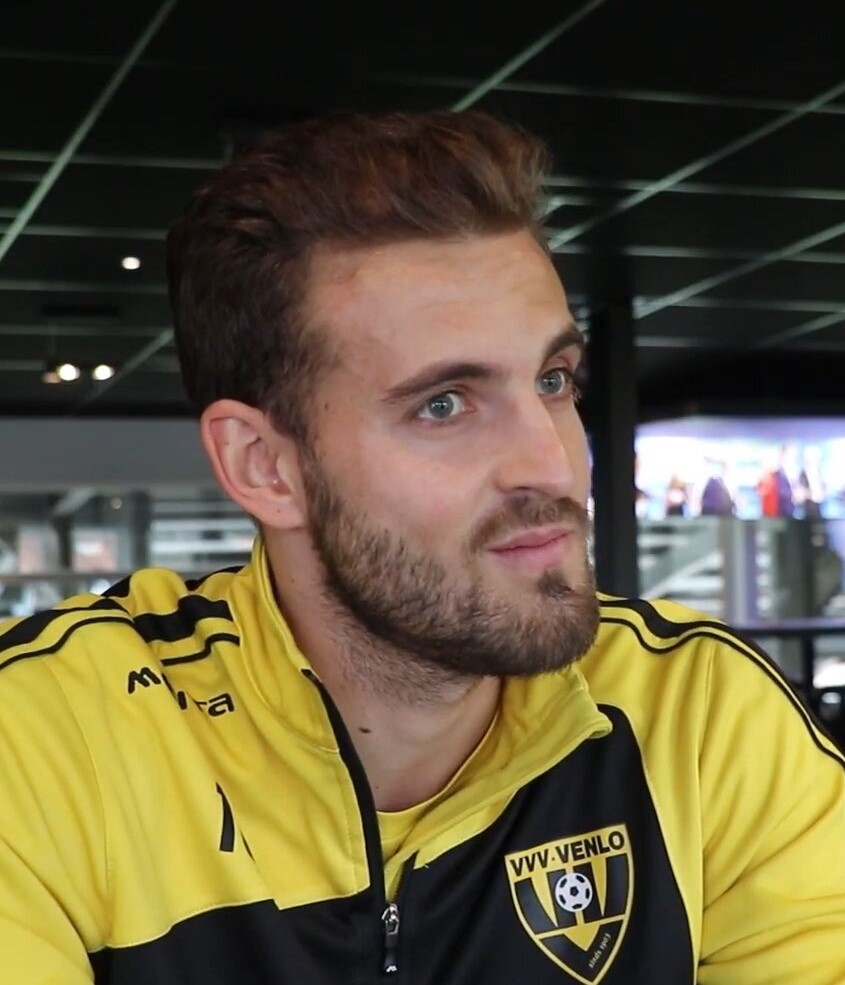
- Gelmi in 2020

Personal information
- Date of birth: 1 March 1995 (age 31)
- Place of birth: Bülach, Switzerland
- Height: 1.88 m (6 ft 2 in)
- Position: Defender

Team information
- Current team: FC Schaffhausen
- Number: 6

Youth career
- 2013–2015: FC St. Gallen U21

Senior career*
Years	Team	Apps	(Gls)
2015–2017	FC St. Gallen	59	(2)
2017–2020	FC Thun	74	(4)
2020	→ VVV-Venlo (loan)	3	(0)
2020–2021	VVV-Venlo	24	(1)
2021–2024	FC Winterthur	54	(0)
2023–2024	Winterthur U21	2	(0)
2024	FC Vaduz	13	(0)
2024–	FC Schaffhausen	8	(0)
- * Club domestic league appearances and goals as of 1 July 2025

Roy Gelmi (born 1 March 1995) is a Swiss footballer, who plays for FC Schaffhausen in the Swiss Challenge League.

== Career ==
On 2 January 2024, Gelmi signed with FC Vaduz. On 30 April, Vaduz announced that they would not extend his contract after the end of the season.

On 1 November 2024, he joined FC Schaffhausen until the end of the year.

== Personal life ==
Born in Switzerland, Gelmi is the son of a Dutch mother.

== Career statistics ==
As of match played on 4 March 2018

Appearances and goals by club, season and competition
Club	Season	League			Cup		League Cup		Other		Total	
Club	Season	Division	Apps	Goals	Apps	Goals	Apps	Goals	Apps	Goals	Apps	Goals
St. Gallen	2014–15	Swiss Super League	4	0	0	0	—				4	0
St. Gallen	2015–16	Swiss Super League	28	1	2	0	—				30	1
St. Gallen	2016–17	Swiss Super League	27	1	2	0	—				29	1
St. Gallen	Total		59	2	4	0	0	0	0	0	63	2
Thun	2017–18	Swiss Super League	21	3	3	0	—				24	3
Career totals			80	5	7	0	0	0	0	0	87	5

== Honours ==
=== Individual ===
- Swiss Super League Team of the Year: 2015–16
