= Tobias Pachonik =

German footballer (born 1995)

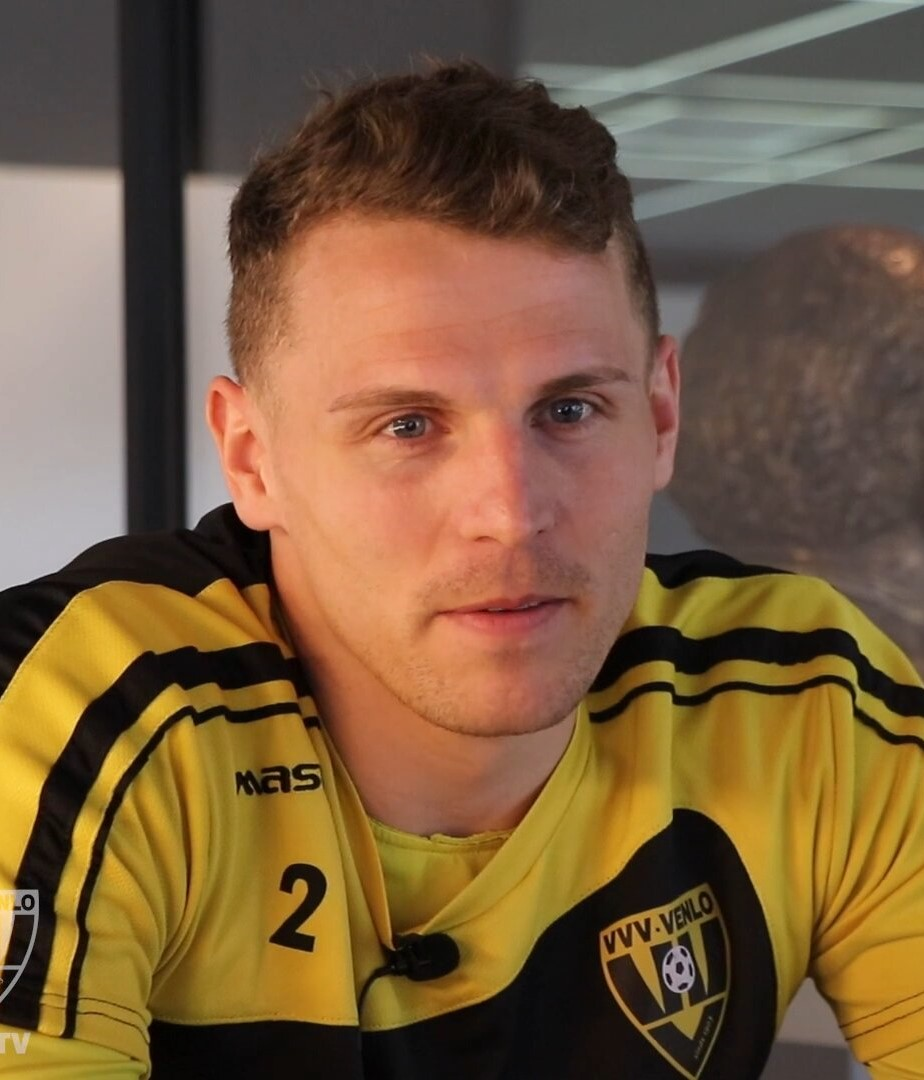
- Pachonik in 2021

Personal information
- Full name: Tobias Raphael Pachonik
- Date of birth: 4 January 1995 (age 31)
- Place of birth: Marktoberdorf, Germany
- Height: 1.85 m (6 ft 1 in)
- Position: Right-back

Team information
- Current team: Palm City
- Number: 22

Youth career
- –2010: TSG Thannhausen
- 2010–2013: 1. FC Nürnberg

Senior career*
Years	Team	Apps	(Gls)
2013–2016	1. FC Nürnberg II	34	(0)
2013–2016	1. FC Nürnberg	7	(0)
2015–2016	→ Stuttgarter Kickers (loan)	15	(0)
2016–2017	Schalke 04 II	33	(1)
2017–2019	Carpi	68	(1)
2019–2022	VVV-Venlo	89	(1)
2023–2024	Stabæk	15	(0)
2024	Baden	16	(0)
2024–2025	Helmond Sport	34	(3)
2025–	Palm City	0	(0)

International career
2014	Germany U19	1	(0)
2014–2015	Germany U20	10	(0)
- * Club domestic league appearances and goals as of 15 May 2025

Tobias Raphael Pachonik (born 4 January 1995) is a German professional footballer who plays as a right-back for Palm City.

== Club career ==
Pachonik joined 1. FC Nürnberg in 2010 from TSG Thannhausen. He made his Bundesliga debut at 3 May 2014 against Hannover 96. He substituted Hiroshi Kiyotake after 56 minutes in a 2–0 home defeat.

On 27 January 2024, Pachonik signed with Baden of Swiss Challenge League. Six months later, on 27 June, Pachonik signed with Dutch second-tier Eerste Divisie club Helmond Sport on a one-year deal with an option for an additional year.

== International career ==
Pachonik has represented Germany at under-19 and under-20 level.
