= 2016–17 VVV-Venlo season =

Dutch football club season

VVV-Venlo
2016–17 season
- Stadium: Seacon Stadion – De Koel
- Eerste Divisie: 2nd
- KNVB Cup: R32
- Top goalscorer: League: Ralf Seuntjens (16 goals); All: Ralf Seuntjens (16 goals)
- Highest home attendance: 8,000 (21st week)
- Lowest home attendance: 3,800 (8th week)
- Average home league attendance: 5,151
- Biggest win: 7-0 Helmond Sport (h) 25th week
- Biggest defeat: 4-0 NAC Breda (h) 32nd week
- All statistics correct as of 24 July 2026.

The 2016–17 season was VVV-Venlo's 37th season in the Eerste Divisie (4th consecutive).

The club competed also in the KNVB Cup. VVV-Venlo lost 2-1 against PEC Zwolle in round of 32 of KNVB Cup and eliminated from the cup.

Ralf Seuntjens was the top scorer of the club in this season with 16 goals in the Eerste Divisie.

Ralf Seuntjens was the most appeared players in this season with 40 appearances; 38 appearances in the Eerste Divisie and 2 appearances in the KNVB Cup.

== Players ==
=== First-team squad ===
Source: Note: Flags indicate national team as defined under FIFA eligibility rules; some limited exceptions apply. Players may hold more than one non-FIFA nationality.

No.	Pos.	Nation	Player
1	GK	NED	Jordy Deckers
2	DF	NED	Moreno Rutten
3	DF	NED	Jerold Promes
4	MF	NED	Robin Buwalda
5	DF	NED	Niels Fleuren
6	MF	NED	Danny Post
7	FW	NED	Vito van Crooij
8	MF	NED	Gianluca Nijholt
9	FW	NED	Ralf Seuntjens
10	MF	NED	Johnatan Opoku
11	FW	NED	Leandro Resida

No.	Pos.	Nation	Player
12	FW	BIH	Boban Lazić
14	MF	NED	Selman Sevinç
15	DF	NED	Dylan Donkers
17	MF	NED	Quin Kruysen
18	FW	NED	Dyon Gijzen
19	FW	NED	Torino Hunte
25	DF	TUR	Evren Korkmaz
27	DF	NED	Jason Bourdouxhe
29	FW	ENG	Sam Westley
31	MF	NED	Mitchell Paulissen
32	DF	BEL	Kristiaan Haagen

== Transfers ==
=== In ===
Pos.	Player	Transferred from	Fee	Date
GK	(Netherlands) Maarten de Fockert	(Netherlands) SC Heerenveen	On loan	1 July 2016
DF	(Germany) Nils Röseler	(Germany) Chemnitzer FC	Free	1 July 2016
MF	(Japan) Rintaro Tashima	(Japan) Keio University	Free	1 July 2016
DF	(Netherlands) Roel Janssen	(Netherlands) Fortuna Sittard	Free	1 July 2016
DF	(Netherlands) Tim Receveur	(Netherlands) Almere City FC	Free	1 July 2016
DF	(Netherlands) Tristan Dekker	(Netherlands) ADO Den Haag U19	Free	1 July 2016
FW	(Netherlands) Joey Sleegers	(Netherlands) NEC Nijmegen	On loan	17 August 2016
DF	(Netherlands) Cendrino Misidjan	(Netherlands) De Treffers	Free	24 January 2017

=== Out ===
Pos.	Player	Transferred to	Fee	Date
DF	(England) Sam Westley	(England) West Ham United F.C.	End of loan	30 June 2016
MF	(Netherlands) Gianluca Nijholt	(Netherlands) NAC Breda	Free	1 July 2016
MF	(Belgium) Jason Bourdouxhe	(Netherlands) Helmond Sport	Free	1 July 2016
GK	(Netherlands) Jordy Deckers	(Cyprus) Ermis Aradippou	Free	1 July 2016
MF	(Netherlands) Quin Kruijsen	No club		1 July 2016
DF	(Belgium) Kristiaan Haagen	(Belgium) ASV Geel	Free	2 July 2016
DF	(Netherlands) Niels Fleuren	(Netherlands) FC Emmen	Free	15 July 2016
MF	(Turkey) Selman Sevinç	(Turkey) Osmanlıspor	Free	23 August 2016

== Competitions ==
=== Overall record ===
Competition	First match	Last match	Starting round	Final position	Record							
Competition	First match	Last match	Starting round	Final position	Pld	W	D	L	GF	GA	GD	Win %
Eerste Divisie	5 August 2016	5 May 2017	Week 1	1st	38	25	5	8	75	35	+40	65.79
KNVB Cup	20 September 2016	27 October 2017	1st round	2nd round	2	1	0	1	3	2	+1	50.00
Total					40	26	5	9	78	37	+41	65.00

Source: ESPN

=== Eerste Divisie ===
==== League table ====
Pos	Team	Pld	W	D	L	GF	GA	GD	Pts	Promotion, qualification or relegation
1	VVV-Venlo (C, P)	38	25	5	8	75	35	+40	80	Promotion to the Eredivisie
2	Jong Ajax (Note: Reserves teams cannot be promoted and cannot participate in the promotion play-offs.)	38	23	7	8	93	54	+39	76	
3	Cambuur	38	22	5	11	78	42	+36	71	Qualification to promotion play-offs Second round (Note: Ten teams, two from the Eredivisie and eight from the Eerste Divisie, play for two spots in the 2017–18 Eredivisie, the remaining eight teams play in the 2017–18 Eerste Divisie. The season is subdivided in periods consisting of games 1–9, 10–18, 19–27 and 28–36. The top finisher in each period (that has not won a previous period) is a period winner and qualifies for the promotion play-offs first round even if they finish the season outside of the top nine.)
4	Jong PSV	38	20	9	9	66	35	+31	69	
5	NAC Breda (O, P)	38	19	7	12	65	50	+15	64	Qualification to promotion play-offs Second round
6	Volendam	38	17	11	10	63	44	+19	62	Qualification to promotion play-offs Second round
7	MVV	38	15	14	9	55	45	+10	59	Qualification to promotion play-offs Second round
8	Almere City	38	17	8	13	74	66	+8	59	Qualification to promotion play-offs First round
9	Emmen	38	14	13	11	50	40	+10	55	Qualification to promotion play-offs First round
10	RKC Waalwijk	38	15	9	14	62	70	−8	54	Qualification to promotion play-offs First round
11	Eindhoven	38	15	8	15	64	71	−7	53	
12	De Graafschap	38	15	5	18	70	63	+7	50	
13	Helmond Sport	38	14	7	17	51	67	−16	49	Qualification to promotion play-offs First round
14	Den Bosch	38	12	9	17	48	67	−19	45	
15	Oss	38	12	5	21	67	95	−28	41	
16	Telstar	38	10	10	18	46	64	−18	40	
17	Fortuna Sittard (Note: Fortuna Sittard were deducted three points for an outstanding bill owed to KNVB. On 10 April 2017 Fortuna Sittard were deducted another 6 points for not meeting financial targets.)	38	13	9	16	54	67	−13	39	
18	Jong FC Utrecht	38	10	7	21	50	71	−21	37	
19	Dordrecht	38	5	9	24	42	72	−30	24	
20	Achilles '29 (Note: Achilles '29 were deducted three points for repeatedly not meeting financial requirements.) (R)	38	5	7	26	37	92	−55	19	Relegation to the Tweede Divisie

Source: NUsport (in Dutch), Soccerway
Rules for classification: 1) points; 2) goal difference; 3) number of goals scored
(C) Champions; (O) Play-off winners; (P) Promoted; (R) Relegated

==== Results summary ====
Overall								Home						Away					
Pld	W	D	L	GF	GA	GD	Pts	W	D	L	GF	GA	GD	W	D	L	GF	GA	GD
38	25	5	8	75	35	+40	80	13	2	4	44	20	+24	12	3	4	31	15	+16

Last updated: 25 July 2026.
Source: 2016-17 Eerste Divisie

==== Results by round ====
Round	1	2	3	4	5	6	7	8	9	10	11	12	13	14	15	16	17	18	19	20	21	22	23	24	25	26	27	28	29	30	31	32	33	34	35	36	37	38
Ground	H	A	H	H	A	H	A	H	A	A	H	A	H	A	A	H	H	A	H	A	H	A	H	A	H	A	H	A	H	A	A	H	H	A	H	A	H	A
Result	W	W	W	L	W	L	L	W	W	L	W	W	W	D	W	W	D	W	W	W	W	W	W	L	W	W	W	D	W	W	L	L	W	W	D	D	L	W
Position																																						1

A = Away; H = Home; W = Win; D = Draw; L = Loss

=== Matches ===
==== 1st half ====
5 August 2016 1st week	VVV Venlo	2-1	SC Cambuur	Venlo
20:00	Vito van Crooij 30'; Ralf Seuntjens 82'	Report	Sander van de Streek 26'	Stadium: Seacon Stadion – De Koel – Attendance: 4,422

12 August 2016 2nd week	MVV Maastricht	1-2	VVV Venlo	Maastricht
20:00	Nick Kuipers 90+1'	Report	Danny Post 81'; Moreno Rutten 90+3'	Stadium: De Geusselt; Attendance: 4,704

19 August 2016 3rd week	VVV Venlo	2-0	TOP Oss	Venlo
20:00	Ralf Seuntjens 17'; Torino Hunte 33'	Report		Stadium: Seacon Stadion – De Koel – Attendance: 3,911

22 August 2016 4th week	VVV Venlo	1-2	Jong PSV	Venlo
20:00	Clint Leemans 33'	Report	Sam Lammers 43'; Jordy de Wijs 83'	Stadium: Seacon Stadion – De Koel – Attendance: 4,277

26 August 2016 5th week	De Graafschap	0-2	VVV Venlo	Doetinchem
20:00		Report	Nils Roseler 55'; Joey Sleegers 82'	Stadium: De Vijverberg; Attendance: 8,230

9 September 2016 6th week	VVV Venlo	0-1	FC Volendam	Venlo
20:00		Report	Jack Tuyp 28'	Stadium: Seacon Stadion – De Koel – Attendance: 4,400

16 September 2016 7th week	Helmond Sport	2-1	VVV Venlo	Helmond
20:00	Teije ten Den 82' (pen.); Furhgill Zeldenrust 87'	Report	Vito van Crooij 85' (pen.)	Stadium: Stadion De Braak; Attendance: 2,397

23 September 2016 8th week	VVV Venlo	2-0	Jong Utrecht	Venlo
20:00	Ralf Seuntjens 10'; Torino Hunte 53'	Report		Stadium: Seacon Stadion – De Koel – Attendance: 3,800

30 September 2016 9th week	Achilles '29	0-3	VVV Venlo	Groesbeek
20:00		Report	Ralf Seuntjens 50'; Torino Hunte 57'; Johnatan Opoku 78'	Stadium: Sportpark de Heikant; Attendance: 1,640

14 October 2016 10th week	Fortuna Sittard	2-0	VVV Venlo	Sittard
20:00	Aziz Khalouta 48' (pen.); Roland van Hout 64'	Report		Stadium: Fortuna Sittard Stadion; Attendance: 2,450

21 October 2016 11th week	VVV Venlo	3-1	FC Den Bosch	Venlo
20:00	Jeremy Fernandes 11' (o.g.); Johnatan Opoku 43'; Clint Leemans 90+1' (pen.)	Report	Jort van der Sande 12'	Stadium: Seacon Stadion – De Koel – Attendance: 4,600

31 October 2016 12th week	Jong Ajax	0-4	VVV Venlo	Duivendrecht, Amsterdam
20:00		Report	Clint Leemans 10'; Johnatan Opoku 15' 85'; Joey Sleegers 42'	Stadium: Sportpark De Toekomst; Attendance: 1,183

4 November 2016 13th week	VVV Venlo	3-1	Dordrecht	Venlo
20:00	Vito van Crooij 22'; Clint Leemans 53' (pen.); Ralf Seuntjens 81'	Report	Michael Chacon 45' (pen.)	Stadium: Seacon Stadion – De Koel – Attendance: 4,227

18 November 2016 14th week	NAC Breda	0-0	VVV Venlo	Breda
20:00		Report		Stadium: Rat Verlegh Stadion; Attendance: 16,753

25 November 2016 15th week	Almere City FC	0-2	VVV Venlo	Almere
20:00		Report	Clint Leemans 38'; Vito van Crooij 58'	Stadium: Yanmar Stadion; Attendance: 2,276

28 November 2016 16th week	VVV Venlo	4-0	RKC Waalwijk	Venlo
20:00	Danny Post 18'; Ralf Seuntjens 71'; Vito van Crooij 73'; Johnatan Opoku 80'	Report		Stadium: Seacon Stadion – De Koel – Attendance: 4,239

2 December 2016 17th week	VVV Venlo	1-1	Telstar	Venlo
20:00	Johnatan Opoku 45+1'	Report	Crescendo van Berkel 83'	Stadium: Seacon Stadion – De Koel – Attendance: 4,621

9 December 2016 18th week	FC Emmen	1-2	VVV Venlo	Emmen
20:00	Tim Siekman 75'	Report	Johnatan Opoku 4'; Torino Hunte 65'	Stadium: De Oude Meerdijk; Attendance: 2,866

16 December 2016 19th week	VVV Venlo	1-0	FC Eindhoven	Venlo
20:00	Joey Sleegers 65'	Report		Stadium: Seacon Stadion – De Koel – Attendance: 4,722

==== 2nd half ====
13 January 2017 20th week	SC Cambuur	0-2	VVV Venlo	Leeuwarden
20:00		Report	Johnatan Opoku 37'; Nils Roseler 45+2'	Stadium: Cambuur Stadion; Attendance: 7,420

22 January 2017 21st week	VVV Venlo	2-1	MVV Maastricht	Venlo
14:30	Johnatan Opoku 16'; Ralf Seuntjens 90+2'	Report	Ricardo Ippel 56'	Stadium: Seacon Stadion – De Koel – Attendance: 8,000

27 January 2017 22nd week	TOP Oss	0-3	VVV Venlo	Oss
20:00		Report	Joey Sleegers 24'; Vito van Crooij 75' 86'	Stadium: Frans Heesen Stadion; Attendance: 2,225

3 February 2017 23rd week	VVV Venlo	4-1	De Graafschap	Venlo
20:00	Vito van Crooij 5'; Roel Janssen 34'; Clint Leemans 52' (pen.); Johnatan Opoku 55'	Report	Piotr Parzyszek 79'	Stadium: Seacon Stadion – De Koel – Attendance: 5,105

6 February 2017 24th week	Jong PSV	2-1	VVV Venlo	Eindhoven
20:00	Jerold Promes 32' (o.g.); Sam Lammers 44'	Report	Ralf Seuntjens 15'	Stadium: De Herdgang; Attendance: 750

10 February 2017 25th week	VVV Venlo	7-0	Helmond Sport	Venlo
20:00	Vito van Crooij 5'; Joey Sleegers 47'; Jerold Promes 53'; Ralf Seuntjens 59'; Clint Leemans 61'; Danny Post 63'; Gedion Zelalem 87'	Report		Stadium: Seacon Stadion – De Koel – Attendance: 5,011

17 February 2017 26th week	FC Volendam	0-1	VVV Venlo	Volendam
20:00		Report	Moreno Rutten 9'	Stadium: Kras Stadion; Attendance: 4,582

24 February 2017 27th week	VVV Venlo	4-0	Achilles '29	Venlo
20:00	Vito van Crooij 6' 87'; Joey Sleegers 9'; Ralf Seuntjens 23'	Report	Boy van de Beek 87'	Stadium: Seacon Stadion – De Koel – Attendance: 4,411

6 March 2017 28th week	Jong Utrecht	0-0	VVV Venlo	Utrecht
20:00		Report		Stadium: Stadion Galgenwaard; Attendance: 771

10 March 2017 29th week	VVV Venlo	4-1	Fortuna	Venlo
20:00	Ralf Seuntjens 13' 45+1' 60'; Vito van Crooij 27'	Report	Emrah Başsan 21'	Stadium: Seacon Stadion – De Koel – Attendance: 6,123

13 March 2017 30th week	FC Den Bosch	0-2	VVV Venlo	Den Bosch
20:00		Report	Vito van Crooij 70'; Clint Leemans 82' (pen.)	Stadium: De Vliert; Attendance: 2,058

17 March 2017 31st week	FC Dordrecht	5-2	VVV Venlo	Dordrecht
20:00	Joel Thomas 15' 90+4' (pen.); Jordy Vleugels 43'; Everon Pisas 83'; Alessio da Cruz 90+1'	Report	Vito van Crooij 13'; Joey Sleegers 17'	Stadium: Stadion Krommedijk; Attendance: 1,109

31 March 2017 32nd week	VVV Venlo	0-4	NAC Breda	Venlo
20:00		Report	Cyriel Dessers 20' 89' (pen.); Robbie Haemhouts 31'; Giovanni Korte 69'	Stadium: Seacon Stadion – De Koel – Attendance: 6,634

7 April 2017 33rd week	VVV Venlo	3-2	Almere City FC	Venlo
20:00	Ralf Seuntjens 11' 41'; Joey Sleegers 80'	Report	Soufyan Ahannach 3'; Damon Mirani 15'	Stadium: Seacon Stadion – De Koel – Attendance: 5,183

14 April 2017 34th week	RKC Waalwijk	1-2	VVV Venlo	Waalwijk
20:00	Johan Voskamp 55' (pen.)	Report	Clint Leemans 38' (pen.) 90'	Stadium: Mandemakers Stadion; Attendance: 3,089

17 April 2017 35th week	VVV Venlo	0-0	FC Emmen	Venlo
14:30		Report		Stadium: Seacon Stadion – De Koel – Attendance: 7,803

21 April 2017 36th week	FC Eindhoven	0-0	VVV Venlo	Eindhoven
20:00		Report		Stadium: Jan Louwers Stadion; Attendance: 3,496

28 April 2017 37th week	VVV Venlo	1-4	Jong Ajax	Venlo
20:00	Clint Leemans 51' (pen.)	Report	Mateo Casierra 10'; Kenny Tete 21'; David Neres 22'; Václav Cerný 65'	Stadium: Seacon Stadion – De Koel – Attendance: 6,379

5 May 2017 38th week	SC Telstar	1-2	VVV Venlo	Velsen-Zuid
20:00	Fabian Serrarens 33'	Report	Ralf Seuntjens 71'; Clint Leemans 87'	Stadium: BUKO Stadion; Attendance: 1,663

=== KNVB Cup ===
20 September 2016 2nd round	NAC Breda	0-2	VVV Venlo	Breda
18:30		Report	Torino Hunte 29' 40'	Stadium: Rat Verlegh Stadion; Attendance: 5,734

27 October 2016 Round of 32	PEC Zwolle	2-1	VVV Venlo	Zwolle
18:30	Kingsley Ehizibue 29'; Youness Mokhtar 52'	Report	Joey Sleegers 83'	Stadium: MAC³PARK Stadion; Attendance: 12,725

== Statistics ==
=== Scorers ===
#	Player	Eerste Divisie	KNVB	Total
1	(Netherlands) Ralf Seuntjens	16	0	16
2	(Netherlands) Vito van Crooij	14	0	14
3	(Netherlands) Clint Leemans	12	0	12
4	(Netherlands) Johnatan Opoku	10	0	10
5	(Netherlands) Joey Sleegers	8	1	9
6	(Netherlands) Torino Hunte	4	2	6
7	(Netherlands) Danny Post	3	0	3
8	(Netherlands) Moreno Rutten	2	0	2
8	(Germany) Nils Röseler	2	0	2
10	(United States) Gedion Zelalem	1	0	1
10	(Netherlands) Jerold Promes	1	0	1
10	(Netherlands) Roel Janssen	1	0	1

=== Appearances ===
#	Player	Eerste Divisie	KNVB	Total
1	(Netherlands) Ralf Seuntjens	38	2	40
2	(Netherlands) Clint Leemans	37	2	39
2	(Netherlands) Jerold Promes	37	2	39
2	(Netherlands) Vito van Crooij	37	2	39
5	(Netherlands) Joey Sleegers	35	2	37
5	(Germany) Nils Röseler	35	2	37
7	(Netherlands) Roel Janssen	34	2	36
7	(Netherlands) Torino Hunte	34	2	36
9	(Netherlands) Danny Post	33	2	35
10	(Netherlands) Tristan Dekker	28	2	30
11	(Netherlands) Johnatan Opoku	27	1	28
12	(Netherlands) Delano van Crooij	25	2	27
13	(Netherlands) Leandro Resida	23	2	25
13	(Netherlands) Moreno Rutten	24	1	25
15	(Netherlands) Tim Receveur	17	0	17
16	(Netherlands) Maarten de Fockert	13	0	13
17	(Netherlands) Cendrino Misidjan	12	0	12
18	(Turkey) Evren Korkmaz	9	1	10
19	(United States) Gedion Zelalem	9	0	9
20	(Japan) Rintaro Tashima	9	0	9
21	(Netherlands) Jelle van Rijswijk	1	0	1
21	(Netherlands) Juul Respen	1	0	1
21	(Morocco) Lugman Bezzat	1	0	1

=== Clean sheets ===
#	Player	Eerste Divisie	KNVB Cup	Total
1	(Netherlands) Delano van Crooij	15	1	16
2	(Netherlands) Maarten de Fockert	4	0	4
Total		19	1	20

=== Disciplinary record ===
#	Player	Eerste Divisie		KNVB		Total	
#	Player	Booked	Sent off (straight red)	Booked	Sent off (straight red)	Booked	Sent off (straight red)
1	(Netherlands) Clint Leemans	0	1	0	0	0	1
2	(Netherlands) Danny Post	10	0	0	0	10	0
3	(Netherlands) Vito van Crooij	8	0	1	0	9	0
4	(Netherlands) Roel Janssen	7	0	1	0	8	0
5	(Netherlands) Jerold Promes	5	0	0	0	5	0
5	(Germany) Nils Röseler	4	0	1	0	5	0
7	(Netherlands) Johnatan Opoku	4	0	0	0	4	0
7	(Netherlands) Torino Hunte	4	0	0	0	4	0
9	(Netherlands) Tristan Dekker	3	0	0	0	3	0
10	(Netherlands) Clint Leemans	2	0	0	0	2	0
10	(Netherlands) Moreno Rutten	2	0	0	0	2	0
10	(Netherlands) Ralf Seuntjens	2	0	0	0	2	0
13	(Netherlands) Cendrino Misidjan	1	0	0	0	1	0
13	(Turkey) Evren Korkmaz	1	0	0	0	1	0
13	(Netherlands) Tim Receveur	1	0	0	0	1	0
