= 2015–16 VVV-Venlo season =

Dutch football club season

VVV-Venlo
2015–16 season
- Stadium: Seacon Stadion – De Koel
- Eerste Divisie: 2nd
- KNVB Cup: 2nd round
- Top goalscorer: League: Ralf Seuntjens (28 goals); All: Ralf Seuntjens (29 goals)
- Highest home attendance: 9,640 (Promotion Play-offs 2nd round 2nd match)
- Lowest home attendance: 3,050 (2nd week)
- Average home league attendance: 4,055
- Biggest win: 5-0 Fortuna Sittard (a) 16th week
- Biggest defeat: 6-1 AZ Alkmaar (a) KNVB Cup 2nd round
- All statistics correct as of 23 July 2026.

The 2015–16 season was VVV-Venlo's 36th season in the Eerste Divisie (3rd consecutive).

The club competed also in the KNVB Cup. VVV-Venlo lost 6-1 against AZ Alkmaar in the 2nd round of KNVB Cup and eliminated from the cup.

Ralf Seuntjens was the top scorer of the club in this season with 29 goals; 28 goals in the Eerste Divisie and 1 goals in the KNVB Cup.

Jordy Deckers, Ralf Seuntjens and Robin Buwalda were the most appeared players in this season with 39 appearances; 36 appearances in the Eerste Divisie, 2 appearances in the Promotion/Relegation Play-offs and 1 appearances in the KNVB Cup.

== Players ==
=== First-team squad ===
Source: Note: Flags indicate national team as defined under FIFA eligibility rules; some limited exceptions apply. Players may hold more than one non-FIFA nationality.

No.	Pos.	Nation	Player
1	GK	NED	Jordy Deckers
2	DF	NED	Moreno Rutten
3	DF	NED	Jerold Promes
4	MF	NED	Robin Buwalda
5	DF	NED	Niels Fleuren
6	MF	NED	Danny Post
7	FW	NED	Vito van Crooij
8	MF	NED	Gianluca Nijholt
9	FW	NED	Ralf Seuntjens
10	MF	NED	Johnatan Opoku
11	FW	NED	Leandro Resida

No.	Pos.	Nation	Player
12	FW	BIH	Boban Lazić
14	MF	NED	Selman Sevinç
15	DF	NED	Dylan Donkers
17	MF	NED	Quin Kruysen
18	FW	NED	Dyon Gijzen
19	FW	NED	Torino Hunte
25	DF	TUR	Evren Korkmaz
27	DF	NED	Jason Bourdouxhe
29	FW	ENG	Sam Westley
31	MF	NED	Mitchell Paulissen
32	DF	BEL	Kristiaan Haagen

== Transfers ==
=== In ===
Pos.	Player	Transferred from	Fee	Date
DF	(England) Sam Westley	(England) West Ham United F.C.	On loan	31 August 2015
GK	(Netherlands) Mitchel Paulissen	(Netherlands) Roda JC Kerkrade	On loan	1 February 2016

=== Out ===
Pos.	Player	Transferred to	Fee	Date
MF	(Netherlands) Mitchel Paulissen	(Netherlands) Roda JC Kerkrade	On loan	30 June 2016
DF	(Netherlands) Robin Buwalda	(Netherlands) ADO Den Haag	End of loan	30 June 2016

== Competitions ==
=== Overall record ===
Competition	First match	Last match	Starting round	Final position	Record							
Competition	First match	Last match	Starting round	Final position	Pld	W	D	L	GF	GA	GD	Win %
Eerste Divisie	7 August 2015	29 April 2016	Week 1	2nd	36	23	6	7	84	39	+45	63.89
Promotion/Relegation playoffs	13 May 2016	16 May 2016	2nd round	2nd round	2	0	1	1	2	3	−1	0.00
KNVB Cup	23 September 2015	23 September 2015	2nd round	2nd round	1	0	0	1	1	6	−5	0.00
Total					39	23	7	9	87	48	+39	58.97

Source: ESPN

=== Eertse Divisie ===
==== Results summary ====
Overall								Home						Away					
Pld	W	D	L	GF	GA	GD	Pts	W	D	L	GF	GA	GD	W	D	L	GF	GA	GD
36	23	6	7	85	39	+46	75	14	1	3	45	17	+28	9	5	4	40	22	+18

Last updated: 22 July 2026.
Source: 2015-16 Eerste Divisie

==== Results by round ====
Round	1	2	3	4	5	6	7	8	9	10	11	12	13	14	15	16	17	18	19	20	21	22	23	24	25	26	27	28	29	30	31	32	33	34	35	36
Ground	A	H	A	H	A	6	A	H	A	H	A	H	A	H	H	A	H	A	H	A	H	H	A	A	H	A	H	A	A	H	A	H	A	H	H	A
Result	D	L	W	D	D	W	D	W	W	L	W	W	L	W	W	W	W	W	W	L	L	W	L	W	W	W	W	D	D	W	L	W	W	W	W	W
Position																																				2

A = Away; H = Home; W = Win; D = Draw; L = Loss

=== Matches ===
==== 1st half ====
7 August 2015 1st week	Almere City FC	3-3	VVV-Venlo	Almere
20:00	Ricardo Kip 5'; Enzio Boldewijn 48'; Paul Quasten 63'	Report	Ralf Seuntjens 25'; Leandro Resida 33'; Danny Post 49'	Stadium: Yanmar Stadion; Attendance: 1,066

14 August 2015 2nd week	VVV-Venlo	1-2	TOP Oss	Venlo
20:00	Leandro Resida 53'	Report	Seku Conneh 39' (pen.); Alvin Fortes 59'	Stadium: De Koel; Attendance: 3,050

21 August 2015 3rd week	Jong PSV	1-5	VVV-Venlo	Eindhoven
20:00	Sam Lammers 56'	Report	Gianluca Nijholt 22' 45'; Johnatan Opoku 28' 83'; Robin Buwalda 73'	Stadium: De Herdgang; Attendance: 1,200

24 August 2015 4th week	VVV-Venlo	1-1	Sparta Rotterdam	Venlo
20:00	Ralf Seuntjens 66'	Report	Loris Brogno 6'	Stadium: De Koel; Attendance: 3,300

28 August 2015 5th week	FC Volendam	1-1	VVV-Venlo	Volendam
20:00	Ties Evers 89'	Report	Vito van Crooij 87'	Stadium: Kras Stadion; Attendance: 4,215

11 September 2015 6th week	VVV-Venlo	2-1	Go Ahead Eagles	Venlo
20:00	Ralf Seuntjens 8'; Vito van Crooij 90+3'	Report	Elvio van Overbeek 20'	Stadium: De Koel; Attendance: 3,900

18 September 2015 7th week	FC Dordrecht	0-0	VVV-Venlo	Dordrecht
20:00		Report		Stadium: Stadion Krommedijk; Attendance: 2,339

27 September 2015 8th week	VVV-Venlo	4-1	Helmond Sport	Venlo
14:30	Leandro Resida 57'; Vito van Crooij 60'; Ralf Seuntjens 63' (pen.) 83'	Report	Carlo de Reuver 13'	Stadium: De Koel; Attendance: 3,800

2 October 2015 9th week	NAC Breda	0-1	VVV-Venlo	Breda
20:00		Report	Ralf Seuntjens 14'	Stadium: Rat Verlegh Stadion; Attendance: 12,940

16 October 2015 10th week	VVV-Venlo	1-2	SC Telstar	Venlo
20:00	Gianluca Nijholt 66'	Report	Marko Maletic 17'; Fabian Serrarens 67'	Stadium: De Koel; Attendance: 3,300

23 October 2015 11th week	FC Den Bosch	0-1	VVV-Venlo	Den Bosch
20:00		Report	Ralf Seuntjens 2'	Stadium: De Vliert; Attendance: 3,504

30 October 2015 12th week	VVV-Venlo	3-0	Jong Ajax	Venlo
20:00	Ralf Seuntjens 23' 25'; Johnatan Opoku 40'	Report		Stadium: De Koel; Attendance: 5,803

6 November 2015 13th week	RKC Waalwijk	2-1	VVV-Venlo	Waalwijk
20:00	Ismaïl Yıldırım 42'; Maikel Verkoelen 55'	Report	Maikel Verkoelen 34' (o.g.)	Stadium: Mandemakers Stadion; Attendance: 2,200

20 November 2015 14th week	VVV-Venlo	1-0	FC Eindhoven	Venlo
20:00	Milan Massop 67' (o.g.)	Report		Stadium: De Koel; Attendance: 3,601

27 November 2015 15th week	VVV-Venlo	3-0	MVV Maastricht	Venlo
20:00	Vito van Crooij 48' 74'; Ralf Seuntjens 58'	Report		Stadium: De Koel; Attendance: 4,300

4 December 2015 16th week	Fortuna Sittard	0-5	VVV-Venlo	Sittard
20:00		Report	Dennis Dengering 5' (o.g.); Vito van Crooij 8'; Gianluca Nijholt 45+1'; Ralf Seuntjens 73' (pen.) 89'	Stadium: Fortuna Sittard Stadion; Attendance: 1,892

11 December 2015 17th week	VVV-Venlo	3-0	Achilles '29	Venlo
	Ralf Seuntjens 37'; Leandro Resida 38'; Torino Hunte 90+3'			Stadium: De Koel; Attendance: 3,402

18 December 2015 18th week	FC Emmen	1-4	VVV-Venlo	Emmen
20:00	Marnix Kolder 42'	Report	Ralf Seuntjens 2' 90+1' (pen.); Johnatan Opoku 69'; Torino Hunte 80'	Stadium: De Oude Meerdijk; Attendance: 3,156

==== 2nd half ====
15 January 2016 19th week	VVV-Venlo	4-0	Almere City FC	Venlo
20:00	Torino Hunte 8'; Ralf Seuntjens 14' 21' (pen.) 26' (pen.)	Report		Stadium: De Koel; Attendance: 3,509

18 January 2016 20th week	TOP Oss	2-1	VVV-Venlo	Oss
20:00	Fatih Kamaçi 50'; Richard van der Venne 88'	Report	Torino Hunte 75'	Stadium: Frans Heesen Stadion; Attendance: 1,503

22 January 2016 21st week	VVV-Venlo	1-2	Jong PSV	Venlo
20:00	Johnatan Opoku 52'	Report	Aleksandar Boljevic 9'; Rai Vloet (90+2~pen.)	Stadium: De Koel; Attendance: 3,753

29 January 2016 22nd week	VVV-Venlo	3-0	FC Volendam	Venlo
20:00	Ralf Seuntjens 33' 81' 90'	Report		Stadium: De Koel; Attendance: 3,519

7 February 2016 23rd week	Sparta Rotterdam	3-1	VVV-Venlo	Rotterdam
14:30	Thomas Verhaar 9' 89'; Ryan Sanusi 79'	Report	Vito van Crooij 26'	Stadium: Sparta-Stadion Het Kasteel; Attendance: 9,607

12 February 2016 24th week	Go Ahead Eagles	0-3	VVV-Venlo	Deventer
20:00		Report	Vito van Crooij 13' 54'; Leandro Resida 90+4'	Stadium: De Adelaarshorst; Attendance: 8,464

15 February 2016 25th week	VVV-Venlo	3-0	FC Dordrecht	Venlo
20:00	Johnatan Opoku 12'; Vito van Crooij 57'; Danzell Gravenberch 62' (o.g.)	Report		Stadium: De Koel; Attendance: 3,150

19 February 2016 26th week	Helmond Sport	1-4	VVV-Venlo	Helmond
20:00	Gillian Justiana 24'	Report	Ralf Seuntjens 33'; Robin Buwalda 45+1' 71'; Johnatan Opoku 74'	Stadium: Stadion De Braak; Attendance: 1,900

26 February 2016 27th week	VVV-Venlo	4-3	NAC Breda	Venlo
20:00	Kristiaan Haagen 24' 45'; Gianluca Nijholt 61'; Johnatan Opoku 79'	Report	Sjoerd Ars 18' 67'; Kristiaan Haagen 89' (o.g.)	Stadium: De Koel; Attendance: 6,183

4 March 2016 28th week	SC Telstar	2-2	VVV-Venlo	Velsen-Zuid
20:00	Tarik Tissoudali 8'; Donovan Deekman 90+2'	Report	Gianluca Nijholt 57'; Johnatan Opoku 76'	Stadium: BUKO Stadion; Attendance: 1,463

11 March 2016 29th week	Jong Ajax	2-2	VVV-Venlo	Duivendrecht, Amsterdam
20:00	Richairo Zivkovic 14' 55'	Report	Ralf Seuntjens 50' (pen.); Torino Hunte 74'	Stadium: Sportpark De Toekomst; Attendance: 445

14 March 2016 30th week	VVV-Venlo	4-3	RKC Waalwijk	Venlo
20:00	Vito van Crooij 29'; Johnatan Opoku 61' 84'; Ralf Seuntjens 64'	Report	Pieter Langedijk 3' 53' (pen.); Jordy Thomassen 33'	Stadium: De Koel; Attendance: 3,515

18 March 2016 31st week	FC Eindhoven	2-0	VVV-Venlo	Eindhoven
20:00	Jinty Caenepeel 14'; Jari Vandeputte 24'	Report		Stadium: Jan Louwers Stadion; Attendance: 3,168

1 April 2016 32nd week	VVV-Venlo	2-1	FC Den Bosch	Venlo
20:00	Mitchell Paulissen 28'; Vito van Crooij 39'	Report	Aziz Khalouta 83'	Stadium: De Koel; Attendance: 4,200

8 April 2016 33rd week	MVV Maastricht	1-3	VVV-Venlo	Maastricht
20:00	Jordy Croux 67'	Report	Ralf Seuntjens 47' 50'; Vito van Crooij 84'	Stadium: De Geusselt; Attendance: 5,103

15 April 2016 34th week	VVV-Venlo	4-1	Fortuna Sittard	Venlo
20:00	Johnatan Opoku 17'; Leandro Resida 57'; Torino Hunte 57'; Jerold Promes 89'	Report	Youri Loen 85'	Stadium: De Koel; Attendance: 4,411

22 April 2016 35th week	VVV-Venlo	1-0	FC Emmen	Venlo
20:00	Johnatan Opoku 51'	Report		Stadium: De Koel; Attendance: 3,552

29 April 2016 36th week	Achilles '29	1-3	VVV-Venlo	Groesbeek
20:00	Nicky van de Groes 90'	Report	Ralf Seuntjens 29' 67'; Mitchell Paulissen 37'	Stadium: Sportpark de Heikant; Attendance: 1,929

==== Promotion/Relegation Play-offs ====
13 May 2016 2nd round 1st match	Go Ahead Eagles	1-0	VVV-Venlo	Deventer
19:45	Leon de Kogel 87' (pen.)	Report		Stadium: De Adelaarshorst; Attendance: 9,320

16 May 2016 2nd round 2nd match	VVV-Venlo	2-2	Go Ahead Eagles	Venlo
14:30	Ralf Seuntjens 40' (pen.); Gianluca Nijholt 43'	Report	Leon de Kogel 12'; Randy Wolters 90+4'	Stadium: De Koel; Attendance: 6,799

Go Ahead Eagles won 3–2 on aggregate.

=== KNVB Cup ===
23 September 2015 2nd round	AZ Alkmaar	6-1	VVV-Venlo	Alkmaar
20:00	Jop van der Linden 8' (pen.); Muamer Tankovic 37' 82'; Robert Muhren 70'; Markus Henriksen 78' 80'	Report	Vito van Crooij 69'	Stadium: AFAS Stadion; Referee: Richard Liesveld

== Statistics ==
=== Scorers ===
#	Player	Eerste Divisie	Promotion Play-offs	KNVB	Total
1	(Netherlands) Ralf Seuntjens	28	1	0	29
2	(Netherlands) Vito van Crooij	13	0	1	14
3	(Netherlands) Johnatan Opoku	13	0	0	13
4	(Netherlands) Gianluca Nijholt	6	1	0	7
5	(Netherlands) Leandro Resida	6	0	0	6
5	(Netherlands) Torino Hunte	6	0	0	6
7	(Netherlands) Robin Buwalda	3	0	0	3
8	(Belgium) Kristiaan Haagen	2	0	0	2
8	(Netherlands) Mitchel Paulissen	2	0	0	2
10	(Netherlands) Danny Post	1	0	0	1
10	(Netherlands) Jerold Promes	1	0	0	1

=== Appearances ===
#	Player	Eerste Divisie	Promotion Play-offs	KNVB	Total
1	(Netherlands) Jordy Deckers	36	2	1	39
1	(Netherlands) Ralf Seuntjens	36	2	1	39
1	(Netherlands) Robin Buwalda	36	2	1	39
4	(Netherlands) Niels Fleuren	35	2	1	38
5	(Netherlands) Gianluca Nijholt	34	2	1	37
5	(Netherlands) Johnatan Opoku	34	2	1	37
5	(Netherlands) Vito van Crooij	34	2	1	37
8	(Netherlands) Leandro Resida	33	2	1	36
9	(Netherlands) Torino Hunte	31	2	0	33
10	(Netherlands) Danny Post	30	2	0	32
11	(Netherlands) Moreno Rutten	30	1	0	31
12	(Netherlands) Jerold Promes	25	2	1	28
13	(Netherlands) Quin Kruijsen	16	0	1	17
13	(Belgium) Kristiaan Haagen	15	1	1	17
13	(Turkey) Selman Sevinç	15	1	1	17
16	(Belgium) Jason Bourdouxhe	15	0	1	16
17	(Netherlands) Mitchel Paulissen	14	1	0	15
18	(Netherlands) Dyon Gijzen	4	0	0	4
18	(Turkey) Evren Korkmaz	4	0	0	4
18	(Netherlands) Dylan Donkers	3	0	1	4
21	(Bosnia and Herzegovina) Boban Lazić	2	0	0	2
22	(England) Sam Westley	1	0	0	1

=== Clean sheets ===
#	Player	Eerste Divisie
1	(Netherlands) Jordy Deckers	13

=== Disciplinary record ===
#	Player	Eerste Divisie		Promotion Play-offs		KNVB		Total	
#	Player	Booked	Sent off (straight red)	Booked	Sent off (straight red)	Booked	Sent off (straight red)	Booked	Sent off (straight red)
1	(Netherlands) Moreno Rutten	6	0	0	1	0	0	6	1
2	(Netherlands) Johnatan Opoku	1	1	0	0	0	0	1	1
2	(Belgium) Kristiaan Haagen	1	0	0	0	0	1	1	1
4	(Belgium) Jason Bourdouxhe	0	1	0	0	0	0	0	1
5	(Netherlands) Gianluca Nijholt	10	0	0	0	0	0	10	0
6	(Netherlands) Danny Post	6	0	1	0	0	0	7	0
6	(Netherlands) Niels Fleuren	5	0	1	0	1	0	7	0
8	(Netherlands) Vito van Crooij	5	0	0	0	0	0	5	0
9	(Netherlands) Ralf Seuntjens	4	0	0	0	0	0	4	0
10	(Netherlands) Jerold Promes	3	0	0	0	0	0	3	0
10	(Netherlands) Leandro Resida	2	0	1	0	0	0	3	0
10	(Netherlands) Quin Kruijsen	2	0	0	0	1	0	3	0
13	(Netherlands) Mitchel Paulissen	1	0	1	0	0	0	2	0
13	(Netherlands) Robin Buwalda	2	0	0	0	0	0	2	0
15	(Netherlands) Dylan Donkers	1	0	0	0	0	0	1	0
15	(Turkey) Selman Sevinç	0	0	1	0	0	0	1	0
15	(Netherlands) Torino Hunte	1	0	0	0	0	0	1	0
