= 2018–19 VVV-Venlo season =

Dutch football club season

VVV-Venlo
2018–19 season
- Stadium: Seacon Stadion – De Koel
- Eredivisie: 12th
- KNVB Cup: 2R
- Top goalscorer: League: Peniel Mlapa (15 goals); All: Peniel Mlapa (15 goals)
- Highest home attendance: 8,000 (2nd, 26th & 29th weeks)
- Lowest home attendance: 6,134 (21st week)
- Average home league attendance: 6,828
- Biggest win: 3-0 (NAC Breda (h) 6th week & RKVV Westlandia (a) KNVB Cup 2nd round); 4-1 De Graafschap (h) 31st week
- Biggest defeat: 6-0 AFC Ajax (h) 20th week
- All statistics correct as of 28 July 2026.

The 2018–19 season was VVV-Venlo's 22nd season in the Eredivisie (2nd consecutive).

The club competed also in the KNVB Cup. VVV-Venlo lost 2-0 against AZ Alkmaar in 2nd round of KNVB Cup and eliminated from the cup.

Peniel Mlapa was the top scorer of the club in this season with 15 goals in the Eredivisie.

Nils Röseler was the most appeared players in this season with 35 appearances; 34 appearances in the Eredivisie and 1 appearance in the KNVB Cup.

== Players ==
=== First-team squad ===
Source: Note: Flags indicate national team as defined under FIFA eligibility rules; some limited exceptions apply. Players may hold more than one non-FIFA nationality.

No.	Pos.	Nation	Player
1	GK	GER	Lars Unnerstall
2	DF	NED	Moreno Rutten
3	DF	NED	Jerold Promes
4	DF	NED	Roel Janssen
6	MF	NED	Danny Post
7	MF	NOR	Martin Samuelsen
9	FW	NED	Ralf Seuntjens
10	MF	NED	Johnatan Opoku
11	FW	SUR	Jay-Roy Grot
13	DF	GER	Nils Röseler
14	DF	NED	Christian Kum
15	DF	CPV	Josimar Lima
16	GK	NED	Delano van Crooij

No.	Pos.	Nation	Player
17	DF	NED	Tristan Dekker
19	FW	NED	Patrick Joosten
19	DF	GER	Axel Borgmann
20	MF	NED	Damian van Bruggen
25	DF	TUR	Evren Korkmaz
25	MF	NED	Peter van Ooijen
26	FW	TOG	Peniel Mlapa
29	MF	NED	Evert Linthorst
31	MF	BIH	Tino-Sven Sušić
34	DF	NED	Simon Janssen
35	MF	NED	Sem Steijn
38	FW	SUR	Yahcuroo Roemer

== Transfers ==
=== In ===
Pos.	Player	Transferred from	Fee	Date
DF	(Netherlands) Christian Kum	(Netherlands) Roda JC Kerkrade	Free	1 July 2018
FW	(Togo) Peniel Mlapa	(Germany) Dynamo Dresden	On loan	1 July 2018
MF	(Netherlands) Sem Steijn	(Netherlands) ADO Den Haag U19	On loan	2 July 2018
FW	(Suriname) Jay-Roy Grot	(England) Leeds United FC	On loan	5 July 2018
MF	(Bosnia and Herzegovina) Tino-Sven Sušić	(Belgium) Royal Antwerp FC	Free	5 July 2018
FW	(Norway) Martin Samuelsen	(England) West Ham United FC U23	On loan	25 July 2018
FW	(Netherlands) Peter van Ooijen	(Netherlands) Heracles Almelo	Free	25 July 2018
MF	(Germany) Axel Borgmann	(Liechtenstein) FC Vaduz	Free	10 August 2018
FW	(Netherlands) Patrick Joosten	(Netherlands) FC Utrecht	On loan	30 August 2018
DF	(Cape Verde) Josimar Lima	No club		7 March 2019

=== Out ===
Pos.	Player	Transferred to	Fee	Date
FW	(Denmark) Emil Riis Jakobsen	(England) Derby County F.C. U23	End of loan	30 June 2018
FW	(Germany) Lennart Thy	(Germany) SV Werder Bremen	End of loan	30 June 2018
FW	(Netherlands) Lugman Bezzat	(Belgium) Sporting Hasselt	Free	1 July 2018
FW	(Netherlands) Romeo Castelen	End of career		1 July 2018
FW	(Netherlands) Torino Hunte	No club		1 July 2018
MF	(Netherlands) Clint Leemans	(Netherlands) PEC Zwolle	€350,000	13 July 2018
MF	(Netherlands) Vito van Crooij	(Netherlands) PEC Zwolle	€650,000	13 July 2018
DF	(Belgium) Leroy Labylle	(Netherlands) NEC Nijmegen		2 August 2018
MF	(Netherlands) Jens Janse	(Italy) Ellera Calcio	Free	6 September 2018
FW	(Norway) Martin Samuelsen	(England) West Ham United F.C. U23	End of loan	18 February 2019
FW	(Netherlands) Ralf Seuntjens	No club		3 May 2019

== Competitions ==
=== Overall record ===
Competition	First match	Last match	Starting round	Final position	Record							
Competition	First match	Last match	Starting round	Final position	Pld	W	D	L	GF	GA	GD	Win %
Eredivisie	11 August 2018	15 May 2019	Week 1	12th	34	11	8	15	47	63	−16	32.35
KNVB Cup	25 September 2018	31 October 2018	1st round	2nd round	2	1	0	1	3	2	+1	50.00
Total					36	12	8	16	50	65	−15	33.33

Source: ESPN

=== Eredivisie ===
==== League table ====
Pos	Team	Pld	W	D	L	GF	GA	GD	Pts
10	Willem II	34	13	5	16	58	72	−14	44
11	Heerenveen	34	10	11	13	64	73	−9	41
12	VVV-Venlo	34	11	8	15	47	63	−16	41
13	PEC Zwolle	34	11	6	17	44	57	−13	39
14	Emmen	34	10	8	16	41	72	−31	38

Source: eredivisie.nl
Rules for classification: Season in progress: 1) Most points won; 2) Less points lost; 3) Goal difference; 4) Goals scored; 5) Alphabetical order; End of season: 1) Points; 2) Goal difference; 3) Goals scored; 4) Head-to-head points; 5) Head-to-head goal difference; 6) Head-to-head away goals scored; 7) Play-off if relevant for deciding champion, relegation or participating in a European league, otherwise by draw. 8) Penalty shoot-out (only after a play-off)

Ten teams, two from the Eredivisie and eight from the Eerste Divisie, played for two spots in the 2019–20 Eredivisie, the remaining eight teams playing in the 2019–20 Eerste Divisie.

First round
NEC	2	0	2
RKC Waalwijk	0	3	3
SC Cambuur	2	2	4
Almere City	2	1	3

Second round
RKC Waalwijk	2	1	3
Excelsior	1	1	2
Go Ahead Eagles	2	1	3
FC Den Bosch	2	0	2
TOP Oss	0	0	0
Sparta Rotterdam	2	3	5
SC Cambuur	1	0	1
De Graafschap	1	2	3

Third round
RKC Waalwijk*	0	5	5
Go Ahead Eagles	0	4	4
Sparta Rotterdam*	1	2	3
De Graafschap	2	0	2

Key: * = Play-off winners, (a) = Wins because of away goals rule, (e) = Wins after extra time in second leg, (p) = Wins after penalty shoot-out.

==== Results summary ====
Overall								Home						Away					
Pld	W	D	L	GF	GA	GD	Pts	W	D	L	GF	GA	GD	W	D	L	GF	GA	GD
34	11	8	15	47	63	−16	41	7	3	7	25	25	0	4	5	8	22	38	−16

Source: https://www.espn.nl/voetbal/team/scorebord/_/id/3731/season/2018

==== Results by round ====
Round	1	2	3	4	5	6	7	8	9	10	11	12	13	14	15	16	17	18	19	20	21	22	23	24	25	26	27	28	29	30	31	32	33	34
Ground	A	H	A	H	A	H	A	A	H	10	H	H	A	A	H	A	H	A	H	A	H	A	H	A	H	H	A	H	H	A	H	A	A	H
Result	W	L	D	D	W	W	L	L	W	10	W	D	L	L	D	L	W	W	L	L	W	L	L	L	W	L	D	L	L	D	W	D	W	L
Position																																		12

Source: Eredivisie
A = Away; H = Home; W = Win; D = Draw; L = Loss

=== Matches ===
==== 1st half ====
11 August 2018 1st week	Willem II Tilburg	0-1	VVV Venlo	Tilburg
18:30		Report	Danny Post 21'	Stadium: Koning Willem II Stadion; Attendance: 11,800

18 August 2018 2nd week	VVV Venlo	0-1	AFC Ajax	Venlo
18:30		Report	Dusan Tadic 88' (pen.)	Stadium: Seacon Stadion – De Koel – Attendance: 8,000

26 August 2018 3rd week	FC Utrecht	1-1	VVV Venlo	Utrecht
14:30	Nicolas Gavory 23'	Report	Tino-Sven Sušić 47' (pen.)	Stadium: Stadion Galgenwaard; Attendance: 15,226

1 September 2018 4th week	VVV Venlo	1-1	SC Heerenveen	Venlo
18:30	Patrick Joosten 69'	Report	Sam Lammers 32'	Stadium: Seacon Stadion – De Koel – Attendance: 6,235

15 September 2018 5th week	De Graafschap	1-2	VVV Venlo	Doetinchem
18:30	Delano Burgzorg 89'	Report	Tino-Sven Sušić 6'; Danny Post 30'	Stadium: De Vijverberg; Attendance: 11,702

22 September 2018 6th week	VVV Venlo	3-0	NAC Breda	Venlo
19:45	Johnatan Opoku 22'; Tino-Sven Sušić 38' (pen.); Jay-Roy Grot 53'	Report		Stadium: Seacon Stadion – De Koel – Attendance: 6,167

29 September 2018 7th week	Excelsior Rotterdam	1-0	VVV Venlo	Rotterdam
20:45	Elías Már Ómarsson 20'	Report		Stadium: Stadion Woudestein; Attendance: 4,106

6 October 2018 8th week	PSV Eindhoven	4-0	VVV Venlo	Eindhoven
19:45	Hirving Lozano 34' 90+2' (pen.); Luuk de Jong 64'; Érick Gutiérrez 87'	Report		Stadium: Philips Stadion; Attendance: 33,800

21 October 2018 9th week	VVV Venlo	2-0	ADO Den Haag	Venlo
14:30	Peniel Mlapa 2' (pen.); Jay-Roy Grot 85'	Report		Stadium: Seacon Stadion – De Koel – Attendance: 7,051

26 October 2018 10th week	FC Emmen	1-1	VVV Venlo	Emmen
20:00	Stef Gronsveld 65'	Report	Peniel Mlapa 15'	Stadium: De Oude Meerdijk; Attendance: 8,150

10 November 2018 11th week	VVV Venlo	3-2	Fortuna Sittard	Venlo
20:45	Ralf Seuntjens 32'; Peniel Mlapa 41' 48'	Report	Finn Stokkers 30'; André Vidigal 86'	Stadium: Seacon Stadion – De Koel – Attendance: 7,534

25 November 2018 12th week	VVV Venlo	2-2	AZ Alkmaar	Venlo
16:45	Peniel Mlapa 30'; Patrick Joosten 90+3'	Report	Teun Koopmeiners 7' (pen.); Oussama Idrissi 15'	Stadium: Seacon Stadion – De Koel – Attendance: 6,217

2 December 2018 13th week	Heracles Almelo	4-1	VVV Venlo	Almelo
14:30	Adrián Dalmau 3'; Lerin Duarte 49' 69'; Kristoffer Peterson 55' (pen.)	Report	Nils Roseler 65'	Stadium: Asito Stadion; Attendance: 10,233

6 December 2018 14th week	Feyenoord	4-1	VVV Venlo	Rotterdam
20:00	Tonny Vilhena 28'; Robin van Persie 33'; Sam Larsson 55' 75'	Report	Tino-Sven Sušić 58'	Stadium: De Kuip; Attendance: 40,000

9 December 2018 15th week	VVV Venlo	0-0	FC Groningen	Venlo
14:30		Report		Stadium: Seacon Stadion – De Koel – Attendance: 6,668

15 December 2018 16th week	SBV Vitesse	2-1	VVV Venlo	Arnhem
20:45	Martin Ødegaard 32'; Oussama Darfalou 80'	Report	Peniel Mlapa 76'	Stadium: GelreDome; Attendance: 13,249

21 December 2018 17th week	VVV Venlo	2-0	PEC Zwolle	Venlo
20:00	Tino-Sven Sušić 28' (pen.); Patrick Joosten 66'	Report		Stadium: Seacon Stadion – De Koel – Attendance: 7,235

==== 2nd half ====
19 January 2019 18th week	ADO Den Haag	2-4	VVV Venlo	Den Haag
19:45	Sheraldo Becker 13'; Erik Falkenburg 60'	Report	Patrick Joosten 43' 51'; Peniel Mlapa 83' (pen.); Jay-Roy Grot 90+7'	Stadium: ADO Den Haag Stadium; Attendance: 10,181

26 January 2019 19th week	VVV Venlo	2-3	FC Emmen	Venlo
20:45	Johnatan Opoku 20' 67'	Report	Alexander Bannink 25'; Jafar Arias 63'; Michael Chacon 90+5'	Stadium: Seacon Stadion – De Koel – Attendance: 6,145

2 February 2019 20th week	AFC Ajax	6-0	VVV Venlo	Amsterdam
19:45	Hakim Ziyech 35'; Kasper Dolberg 52'; Dusan Tadic 60'; David Neres 85'; Klaas-Jan Huntelaar 87'; Donny van de Beek 90+1'	Report		Stadium: Johan Cruijff Arena; Attendance: 52,868

9 February 2019 21st week	VVV Venlo	2-1	Willem II Tilburg	Venlo
20:45	Peniel Mlapa 43' 77'	Report	Daniel Crowley 60' (pen.)	Stadium: Seacon Stadion – De Koel – Attendance: 6,134

16 February 2019 22nd week	AZ Alkmaar	3-0	VVV Venlo	Alkmaar
18:30	Guus Til 7'; Nils Roseler 22' (o.g.); Mats Seuntjens 61'	Report		Stadium: AFAS Stadion; Attendance: 14,675

22 February 2019 23rd week	VVV Venlo	0-1	Heracles Almelo	Venlo
20:00		Report	Mohammed Osman 83' (pen.)	Stadium: Seacon Stadion – De Koel – Attendance: 6,534

3 March 2019 24th week	FC Groningen	3-2	VVV Venlo	Groningen
14:30	Mimoun Mahi 24' (pen.) 41' (pen.); Iliass Bel Hassani 64'	Report	Danny Post 20'; Peniel Mlapa 46'	Stadium: Euroborg; Attendance: 16,757

9 March 2019 25th week	VVV Venlo	1-0	Excelsior Rotterdam	Venlo
18:30	Johnatan Opoku 45+2'	Report		Stadium: Seacon Stadion – De Koel – Attendance: 6,382

17 March 2019 26th week	VVV Venlo	0-1	PSV Eindhoven	Venlo
12:15		Report	Hirving Lozano 86'	Stadium: Seacon Stadion – De Koel – Attendance: 8,000

31 March 2019 27th week	NAC Breda	1-1	VVV Venlo	Breda
12:15	Greg Leigh 66'	Report	Peniel Mlapa 14'	Stadium: Rat Verlegh Stadion; Attendance: 17,946

3 April 2019 28th week	VVV Venlo	2-6	FC Utrecht	Venlo
18:30	Johnatan Opoku 18'; Patrick Joosten 41'	Report	Riechedly Bazoer 22' 53'; Danny Post 61' (o.g.); Sean Klaiber 63'; Sander van de Streek 69'; Michiel Kramer 88'	Stadium: Seacon Stadion – De Koel – Attendance: 6,723

7 April 2019 29th week	VVV Venlo	0-3	Feyenoord	Venlo
14:30		Report	Sam Larsson 24'; Nicolai Jørgensen 72'; Tyrell Malacia 90+2'	Stadium: Seacon Stadion – De Koel – Attendance: 8,000

13 April 2019 30th week	Fortuna Sittard	1-1	VVV Venlo	Sittard
20:45	Andrija Novakovich 11'	Report	Jay-Roy Grot 81'	Stadium: Fortuna Sittard Stadion; Attendance: 9,511

20 April 2019 31st week	VVV Venlo	4-1	De Graafschap	Venlo
20:45	Ralf Seuntjens 38'; Peniel Mlapa 55'; Jay-Roy Grot 58'; Moreno Rutten 85'	Report	Furdjel Narsingh 2'	Stadium: Seacon Stadion – De Koel – Attendance: 6,545

23 April 2019 32nd week	SC Heerenveen	2-2	VVV Venlo	Heerenveen
19:45	Michel Vlap 28' 75'	Report	Jay-Roy Grot 56'; Sem Steijn 89'	Stadium: Abe Lenstra Stadion; Attendance: 17,450

12 May 2019 33rd week	PEC Zwolle	2-4	VVV Venlo	Zwolle
14:30	Lennart Thy 43'; Stanley Elbers 85'	Report	Peniel Mlapa 54' 57' 74'; Peter van Ooijen 65'	Stadium: MAC³PARK Stadion; Attendance: 13,189

15 May 2019 34th week	VVV Venlo	1-3	SBV Vitesse	Venlo
19:30	Peter van Ooijen 68'	Report	Vyacheslav Karavaev 23'; Martin Ødegaard 39'; Matúš Bero 83'	Stadium: Seacon Stadion – De Koel – Attendance: 6,512

=== KNVB Cup ===
25 September 2018 1st round	RKVV Westlandia	0-3	VVV Venlo	Naaldwijk
19:45		Report	Martin Samuelsen 27' 57'; Christian Kum 65'	Stadium: Sportpark de Hoge Bomen; Attendance: 2,250

31 October 2018 2nd round	AZ Alkmaar	2-0	VVV Venlo	Alkmaar
19:45	Mats Seuntjens 46'; Oussama Idrissi 87'	Report		Stadium: AFAS Stadion; Attendance: 6,026

== Statistics ==
=== Scorers ===
#	Player	Eredivisie	KNVB	Total
1	(Togo) Peniel Mlapa	15	0	15
2	(Suriname) Jay-Roy Grot	6	0	6
2	(Netherlands) Patrick Joosten	6	0	6
4	(Netherlands) Johnatan Opoku	5	0	5
4	(Bosnia and Herzegovina) Tino-Sven Sušić	5	0	5
6	(Netherlands) Danny Post	3	0	3
7	(Netherlands) Peter van Ooijen	2	0	2
7	(Netherlands) Ralf Seuntjens	2	0	2
7	(Norway) Martin Samuelsen	0	2	2
10	(Netherlands) Moreno Rutten	1	0	1
10	(Germany) Nils Roseler	1	0	1
10	(Netherlands) Sem Steijn	1	0	1
10	(Netherlands) Christian Kum	0	1	1

=== Appearances ===
#	Player	Eredivisie	KNVB	Total
1	(Germany) Nils Röseler	34	1	35
2	(Suriname) Jay-Roy Grot	33	1	34
2	(Germany) Lars Unnerstall	33	1	34
4	(Netherlands) Moreno Rutten	32	1	33
5	(Netherlands) Patrick Joosten	30	2	32
5	(Togo) Peniel Mlapa	30	2	32
7	(Netherlands) Johnatan Opoku	29	1	30
7	(Netherlands) Ralf Seuntjens	29	1	30
7	(Netherlands) Danny Post	28	2	30
10	(Bosnia and Herzegovina) Tino-Sven Sušić	27	1	28
11	(Netherlands) Peter van Ooijen	25	2	27
12	(Netherlands) Christian Kum	24	2	26
13	(Netherlands) Roel Janssen	23	0	23
14	(Netherlands) Jerold Promes	22	0	22
15	(Netherlands) Damian van Bruggen	18	2	20
16	(Netherlands) Evert Linthorst	13	0	13
17	(Norway) Martin Samuelsen	10	2	12
18	(Netherlands) Tristan Dekker	10	1	11
19	(Germany) Axel Borgmann	7	2	9
20	(Netherlands) Delano van Crooij	2	1	3
20	(Netherlands) Sem Steijn	2	1	3
22	(Turkey) Evren Korkmaz	2	0	2
22	(Cape Verde) Josimar Lima	2	0	2
22	(Netherlands) Simon Janssen	2	0	2
25	(Suriname) Yahcuroo Roemer	0	1	1

=== Clean sheets ===
#	Player	Eredivisie	KNVB Cup	Total
1	(Germany) Lars Unnerstall	8	0	8
2	(Netherlands) Delano van Crooij	1	1	2
Total		9	1	10

=== Disciplinary record ===
#	Player	Eredivisie		KNVB		Total	
#	Player	Booked	Sent off (straight red)	Booked	Sent off (straight red)	Booked	Sent off (straight red)
1	(Netherlands) Moreno Rutten	4	1	0	0	4	1
2	(Netherlands) Roel Janssen	3	1	0	0	3	1
3	(Netherlands) Christian Kum	7	0	0	0	7	0
4	(Netherlands) Danny Post	5	0	0	0	5	0
5	(Netherlands) Jerold Promes	4	0	0	0	4	0
5	(Togo) Peniel Mlapa	4	0	0	0	4	0
7	(Germany) Nils Roseler	3	0	0	0	3	0
7	(Netherlands) Patrick Joosten	3	0	0	0	3	0
9	(Netherlands) Evert Linthorst	2	0	0	0	2	0
9	(Germany) Lars Unnerstall	2	0	0	0	2	0
9	(Netherlands) Ralf Seuntjens	2	0	0	0	2	0
9	(Bosnia and Herzegovina) Tino-Sven Sušić	2	0	0	0	2	0
13	(Suriname) Jay-Roy Grot	1	0	0	0	1	0
13	(Netherlands) Johnatan Opoku	1	0	0	0	1	0
13	(Netherlands) Peter van Ooijen	1	1	0	0	1	1
13	(Netherlands) Simon Janssen	0	0	1	0	1	0
