= List of VVV-Venlo seasons =

This is a list of the seasons played by VVV-Venlo from 1956.

== Summary of VVV-Venlo seasons ==
=== 1960s ===
VVV-Venlo enjoyed one of the most successful periods in the club's history at the start of the decade, finishing third in the Eredivisie in 1960–61, their highest-ever league finish. However, a rapid decline followed as they were relegated from the Eredivisie in 1961–62, and then from the Eerste Divisie in 1965–66, dropping into the Tweede Divisie. The club responded immediately by winning promotion back to the Eerste Divisie in 1966–67. Their best KNVB Cup performance of the decade was reaching the quarter-finals in 1968–69.

=== 1970s ===
VVV-Venlo spent most of the decade in the Eerste Divisie before securing promotion to the Eredivisie through the promotion play-offs in 1976. They gradually re-established themselves in the top flight and remained there for the rest of the decade. The club's strongest league finish during the 1970s was 11th place in the 1978–79 season, while their best KNVB Cup run ended in the quarter-finals.

=== 1980s ===
The decade was marked by both setbacks and success. VVV-Venlo were relegated from the Eredivisie in 1982–83 but returned after winning promotion in 1985. They then enjoyed one of their strongest top-flight spells, finishing fifth in the 1988–89 season, which remains one of the club's best Eredivisie campaigns. VVV also reached the semi-finals of the 1987–88 KNVB Cup, their best cup performance in the professional era until 2021.

=== 1990s ===
VVV-Venlo won promotion to the Eredivisie through the play-offs in 1991 and captured the 1992–93 Eerste Divisie championship two years later. Despite these achievements, the club struggled to establish itself in the top division and alternated between the Eredivisie and Eerste Divisie during the decade. Their best KNVB Cup performance came in 1998–99, when they reached the quarter-finals.

=== 2000s ===
After several seasons in the Eerste Divisie, VVV-Venlo earned promotion to the Eredivisie via the play-offs in 2007. They were immediately relegated but bounced back by winning the 2008–09 Eerste Divisie title, finishing comfortably ahead of the competition. The arrival of Japanese international Keisuke Honda during this period played a major role in the club's resurgence. VVV also reached the quarter-finals of the 2008–09 KNVB Cup.

=== 2010s ===
VVV-Venlo remained in the Eredivisie until relegation in 2012–13, after which they spent four seasons in the Eerste Divisie. They won the 2016–17 Eerste Divisie title to secure an immediate return to the top flight. During their second Eredivisie spell, the club achieved stable mid-table finishes, placing 12th in both 2017–18 and 2018–19. Their best KNVB Cup performance during the decade was reaching the round of 16 on multiple occasions.

=== 2020s ===
The decade began with one of the most remarkable seasons in the club's history. Despite suffering a record 13–0 Eredivisie defeat to Ajax, VVV reached the semi-finals of the 2020–21 KNVB Cup and Giorgos Giakoumakis became the club's first Eredivisie top scorer with 26 goals. The club was nevertheless relegated from the Eredivisie in 2021. Since then, VVV have competed in the Eerste Divisie, qualifying for the promotion play-offs in 2022–23, where they reached the semi-finals before being eliminated by Almere City.

== Seasons ==
Key to KNVB Cup rounds:

- 2R – Second round
- 3R – Third round
- GS – Group stage
- QF – Quarter-final
- R16 – 1/8 Final (round of 16)
- R32 – 1/16 Final (round of 32)
- SF – Semi-final

Seasons of VVV-Venlo
| # | Season | League | | | | | KNVB Cup | Top scorer(s) | |
| # | Season | Division | Total | Consecutive | Pts | Pos | KNVB Cup | Player(s) | Goals |
|---|---|---|---|---|---|---|---|---|---|
| 1 | 1956–57 | Eredivisie | 1st | 1st | 38 | 7th | — | — | — |
| 2 | 1957–58 | Eredivisie | 2nd | 2nd | 35 | 7th | — | — | — |
| 3 | 1958–59 | Eredivisie | 3rd | 3rd | 36 | 9th | — | — | — |
| 4 | 1959–60 | Eredivisie | 4th | 4th | 36 | 6th | — | — | — |
| 5 | 1960–61 | Eredivisie | 5th | 5th | 42 | 3rd | — | — | — |
| 6 | 1961–62 | Eredivisie | 6th | 6th | 27 | 17th (Note: Relegated to Eerste Divisie.) | — | — | — |
| 7 | 1962–63 | Eerste Divisie | 1st | 1st | 23 | 14th | — | — | — |
| 8 | 1963–64 | Eerste Divisie | 2nd | 2nd | 23 | 14th | — | — | — |
| 9 | 1964–65 | Eerste Divisie | 3rd | 3rd | 29 | 8th | — | — | — |
| 10 | 1965–66 | Eerste Divisie | 4th | 4th | 13 | 15th (Note: Relegated to Tweede Divisie.) | — | — | — |
| 11 | 1966–67 | Tweede Divisie | 1st | 1st | 59 | 2nd (Note: Promoted to Eerste Divisie.) | — | — | — |
| 12 | 1967–68 | Eerste Divisie | 5th | 1st | 23 | 18th (Note: Relegated to Tweede Divisie via play-offs.) | Group | — | — |
| 13 | 1968–69 | Tweede Divisie | 2nd | 1st | 27 | 15th | 1R | — | — |
| 14 | 1969–70 | Tweede Divisie | 3rd | 2nd | 18 | 16th | 1R | — | — |
| 15 | 1970–71 | Tweede Divisie | 4th | 3rd | 30 | 11th (Note: Promoted to Eredivisie.) | 1R | — | — |
| 16 | 1971–72 | Eerste Divisie | 6th | 1st | 34 | 16th | R32 | — | — |
| 17 | 1972–73 | Eerste Divisie | 7th | 2nd | 28 | 18th | R32 | — | — |
| 18 | 1973–74 | Eerste Divisie | 8th | 3rd | 33 | 16th | R32 | — | — |
| 19 | 1974–75 | Eerste Divisie | 9th | 4th | 43 | 5th | R32 | — | — |
| 20 | 1975–76 | Eerste Divisie | 10th | 5th | 49 | 2nd (Note: Promoted to Eredivisie via play-offs.) | R32 | — | — |
| 21 | 1976–77 | Eredivisie | 7th | 1st | 27 | 13th | R32 | — | — |
| 22 | 1977–78 | Eredivisie | 8th | 2nd | 28 | 14th | R32 | — | — |
| 23 | 1978–79 | Eredivisie | 9th | 3rd | 14 | 18th | R32 | — | — |
| 24 | 1979–80 | Eerste Divisie | 11th | 1st | 35 | 12th | 1R | — | — |
| 25 | 1980–81 | Eerste Divisie | 12th | 2nd | 33 | 13th | R16 | — | — |
| 26 | 1981–82 | Eerste Divisie | 13th | 3rd | 41 | 7th | R32 | — | — |
| 27 | 1982–83 | Eerste Divisie | 14th | 4th | 31 | 7th | R16 | — | — |
| 28 | 1983–84 | Eerste Divisie | 15th | 5th | 32 | 10th | R32 | — | — |
| 29 | 1984–85 | Eerste Divisie | 16th | 6th | 45 | 2nd | R32 | — | — |
| 30 | 1985–86 | Eredivisie | 10th | 1st | 27 | 13th | 1R | — | — |
| 31 | 1986–87 | Eredivisie | 11th | 2nd | 37 | 5th | R16 | — | — |
| 32 | 1987–88 | Eredivisie | 12th | 3rd | 38 | 5th | SF | — | — |
| 33 | 1988–89 | Eredivisie | 13th | 4th | 24 | 17th | R32 | — | — |
| 34 | 1989–90 | Eerste Divisie | 17th | 1st | 39 | 4th | 2R | — | — |
| 35 | 1990–91 | Eerste Divisie | 18th | 2nd | 49 | 3rd | 2R | — | — |
| 36 | 1991–92 | Eredivisie | 14th | 1st | 12 | 18th | QF | — | — |
| 37 | 1992–93 | Eerste Divisie | 19th | 1st | 50 | 1st | 3R | — | — |
| 38 | 1993–94 | Eredivisie | 15th | 1st | 25 | 17th (Note: Relegated to Eerste Divisie via play-offs.) | 3R | — | — |
| 39 | 1994–95 | Eerste Divisie | 20th | 1st | 29 | 12th | R32 | — | — |
| 40 | 1995–96 | Eerste Divisie | 21st | 2nd | 57 | 5th | QR | — | — |
| 41 | 1996–97 | Eerste Divisie | 22nd | 3rd | 57 | 4th | R32 | — | — |
| 42 | 1997–98 | Eerste Divisie | 23rd | 4th | 47 | 11th | Group | — | — |
| 43 | 1998–99 | Eerste Divisie | 24th | 5th | 42 | 11th | R32 | — | — |
| 44 | 1999–00 | Eerste Divisie | 25th | 6th | 35 | 15th | Group | — | — |
| 45 | 2000–01 | Eerste Divisie | 26th | 7th | 28 | 18th | R16 | — | — |
| 46 | 2001–02 | Eerste Divisie | 27th | 8th | 38 | 13th | R32 | — | — |
| 47 | 2002–03 | Eerste Divisie | 28th | 9th | 37 | 13th | R32 | — | — |
| 48 | 2003–04 | Eerste Divisie | 29th | 10th | 61 | 7th | 2R | — | — |
| 49 | 2004–05 | Eerste Divisie | 30th | 11th | 62 | 3rd | 2R | — | — |
| 50 | 2005–06 | Eerste Divisie | 31st | 12th | 68 | 2nd | R32 | — | — |
| 51 | 2006–07 | Eerste Divisie | 32nd | 13th | 71 | 2nd | 2R | — | — |
| 52 | 2007–08 | Eredivisie | 16th | 1st | 29 | 17th | 2R | — | — |
| 53 | 2008–09 | Eerste Divisie | 33rd | 1st | 80 | 1st | 2R | — | — |
| 54 | 2009–10 | Eredivisie | 17th | 1st | 35 | 12th | R32 | — | — |
| 55 | 2010–11 | Eredivisie | 18th | 2nd | 21 | 17th | 3R | — | — |
| 56 | 2011–12 | Eredivisie | 19th | 3rd | 31 | 16th | 2R | — | — |
| 57 | 2012–13 | Eredivisie | 20th | 4th | 28 | 17th | 2R | — | — |
| 58 | 2013–14 | Eerste Divisie | 34th | 1st | 61 | 5th | R16 | — | — |
| 59 | 2014–15 | Eerste Divisie | 35th | 2nd | 60 | 7th | R16 | — | — |
| 60 | 2015–16 | Eerste Divisie | 36th | 3rd | 75 | 2nd | 2R | (Netherlands) Ralf Seuntjens | 29 |
| 61 | 2016–17 | Eerste Divisie | 37th | 4th | 80 | 1st | R32 | (Netherlands) Ralf Seuntjens | 16 |
| 62 | 2017–18 | Eredivisie | 21st | 1st | 34 | 15th | R16 | (Netherlands) Clint Leemans | 10 |
| 63 | 2018–19 | Eredivisie | 22nd | 2nd | 41 | 12th | R32 | (Togo) Peniel Mlapa | 15 |
| 64 | 2019–20 | Eredivisie | 23rd | 3rd | 28 | 13th | 1R | (Netherlands) Johnatan Opoku | 7 |
| 65 | 2020–21 | Eredivisie | 24th | 4th | 23 | 17th | SF | (Greece) Giorgos Giakoumakis | 29 |
| 66 | 2021–22 | Eerste Divisie | 38th | 1st | 48 | 10th | 1R | (Netherlands) Sven Braken | 11 |
| 67 | 2022–23 | Eerste Divisie | 39th | 2nd | 58 | 7th | 1R | (Netherlands) Sven Braken | 16 |
| 68 | 2023–24 | Eerste Divisie | 40th | 3rd | 48 | 12th | 1R | (Netherlands) Levi Smans (Greece) Michalis Kosidis | 9 |
| 69 | 2024–25 | Eerste Divisie | 41st | 4th | 41 | 14th | 1R | (France) Gabin Blancquart | 5 |
| 70 | 2025–26 | Eerste Divisie | 42nd | 5th | 45 | 13th | 1R | (Netherlands) Dean Zandbergen | 15 |
| 71 | 2026–27 | Eerste Divisie | 43rd | 6th | | | | — | — |
