= Maarten de Fockert =

Dutch footballer (born 1995)

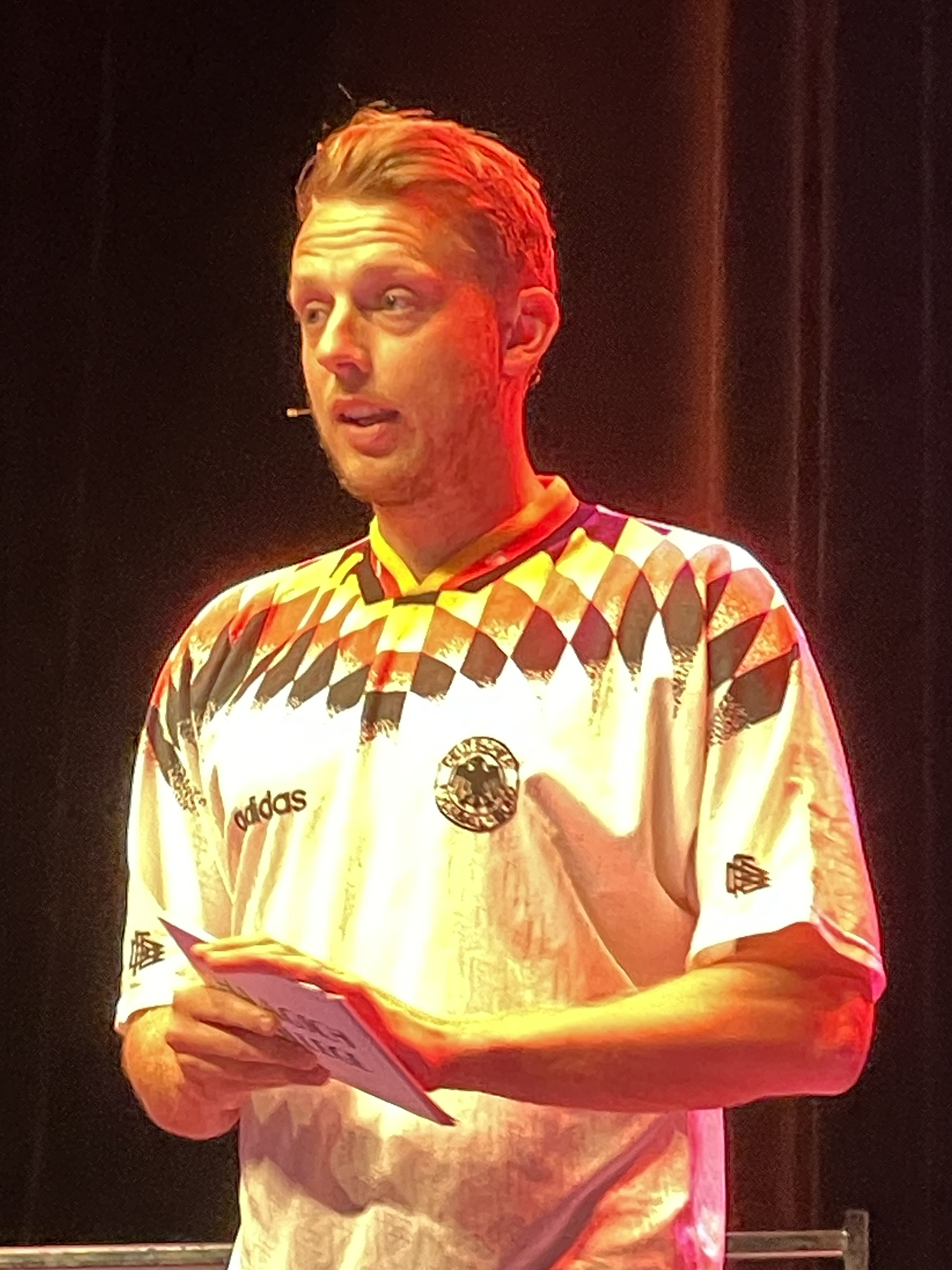

Personal information
- Date of birth: 20 February 1995 (age 31)
- Place of birth: Maasland, Netherlands
- Height: 1.89 m (6 ft 2 in)
- Position: Goalkeeper

Team information
- Current team: SC Feyenoord

Youth career
- MVV '27
- Feyenoord
- Heerenveen

Senior career*
Years	Team	Apps	(Gls)
2014–2018	Heerenveen	0	(0)
2016–2017	→ VVV (loan)	13	(0)
2017–2018	→ Go Ahead Eagles (loan)	0	(0)
2018–2021	Excelsior	8	(0)
2022–2025	SteDoCo	92	(0)
2025–	SC Feyenoord		

International career
2013–2014	Netherlands U19	2	(0)
- * Club domestic league appearances and goals

Maarten de Fockert (born 20 February 1995) is a Dutch footballer who plays as a goalkeeper for Vierde Divisie club SC Feyenoord.

== Club career ==
Born in Maasland, De Fockert started playing football at local amateur side MVV '27 before joining the Feyenoord academy. He then played for Heerenveen, VVV, Go Ahead Eagles and Excelsior but since he always remained a reserve goalkeeper he finished his professional career in 2021. He moved to amateur side SteDoCo, before returning to SC Feyenoord in 2025.

== International career ==
De Fockert played 2 games for the Netherlands national under-19 football team.
