= Tristan Dekker =

Dutch footballer (born 1998)

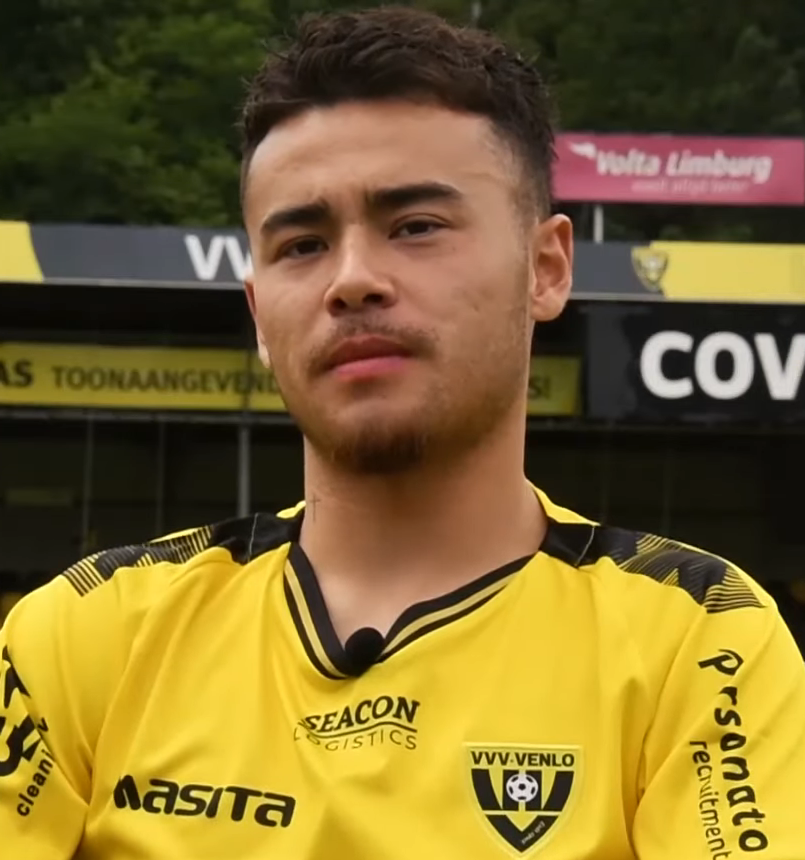
- Dekker with VVV-Venlo in 2021

Personal information
- Date of birth: 27 March 1998 (age 28)
- Place of birth: The Hague, Netherlands
- Height: 1.84 m (6 ft 0 in)
- Position: Right-back

Youth career
- 2003–2005: RVC/Rijswijk
- 2005–2006: Haaglandia
- 2006–2016: ADO Den Haag

Senior career*
Years	Team	Apps	(Gls)
2016–2023	VVV-Venlo	113	(4)
2025–2026	VPS	20	(1)
2026	TOP Oss	2	(0)

International career
2013–2014	Netherlands U16	4	(0)
2017	Netherlands U19	3	(0)
2019	Netherlands U20	1	(0)
- * Club domestic league appearances and goals as of 28 April 2026

Tristan Dekker (born 27 March 1998) is a Dutch professional footballer who plays as a right-back.

== Club career ==
=== Early years ===
Born in The Hague, Dekker joined the ADO Den Haag youth academy as a seven-year-old from RVC/Rijswijk, and progressed through the youth teams. On 13 March 2014, he signed his first professional contract with ADO.

=== VVV-Venlo ===
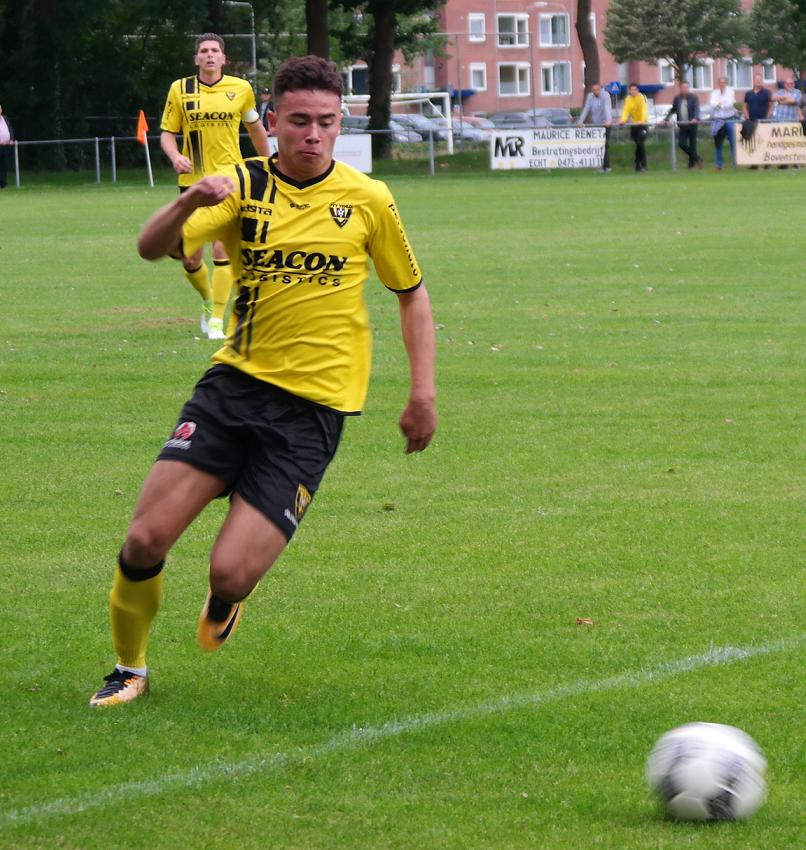
Dekker with VVV-Venlo in 2018

Two years later, on 29 June 2016, Dekker joined VVV-Venlo on a two-year contract with an option for an additional season, reuniting him with former ADO manager Maurice Steijn. On 12 August 2016, aged 18, Dekker made his professional debut in a 2–1 away win over MVV Maastricht in the Eerste Divisie, replacing Torino Hunte in the 89th minute.

In September 2017, Dekker was sidelined for several months with appendicitis that kept him sidelined for months. At the end of March 2018, the club opted to extend his contract to 2019.

In May 2019, the two parties agreed on a new two-year contract, and at the end of March 2021, VVV terminated his expiring contract, but after suffering relegation from the Eredivisie in May 2021, the club reopened negotiations. With an offer from fellow relegation candidate Emmen, Dekker signed a new two-year deal with VVV on 5 July 2021.

In the 2021–22 season, his sixth season for VVV, Dekker scored his first goal in professional football. During a 2–1 away loss to Volendam on 17 September 2021, he completed a solo-run with a strike from distance which found the back of the net. On 13 February 2022, Dekker broke his fibula in a home derby against Roda JC Kerkrade after a collision with Davy van den Berg, leaving him sidelined for months.

On 11 November 2022, Dekker made his 100th league appearance for VVV in the 0–0 home draw against Willem II. He left VVV at the end of the season, as his contract was not extended.

=== VPS ===
On 7 January 2025, Finnish Veikkausliiga club Vaasan Palloseura (VPS) announced the signing of Dekker for the 2025 season.

=== TOP Oss ===
On 3 February 2026, Dekker returned to the Netherlands and signed with TOP Oss.

== International career ==
Dekker was born in the Netherlands to a Dutch father, and a South Korean mother. He played four matches for the Netherlands U16.

== Career statistics ==
As of match played 4 October 2025

Appearances and goals by club, season and competition
Club	Season	League			Cup (Note: Includes KNVB Cup)		League cup		Europe		Other		Total	
Club	Season	Division	Apps	Goals	Apps	Goals	Apps	Goals	Apps	Goals	Apps	Goals	Apps	Goals
VVV-Venlo	2016–17	Eerste Divisie	29	0	2	0	—		—		—		31	0
VVV-Venlo	2017–18	Eredivisie	15	0	0	0	—		—		—		15	0
VVV-Venlo	2018–19	Eredivisie	10	0	1	0	—		—		—		11	0
VVV-Venlo	2019–20	Eredivisie	4	0	0	0	—		—		—		4	0
VVV-Venlo	2020–21	Eredivisie	15	0	2	0	—		—		—		17	0
VVV-Venlo	2021–22	Eerste Divisie	17	2	1	0	—		—		—		19	2
VVV-Venlo	2022–23	Eerste Divisie	23	2	2	0	—		—		3 (Note: Appearances in Eredivisie promotion/relegation playoffs)	0	28	2
VVV-Venlo	Total		113	4	8	0	0	0	0	0	3	0	124	4
VPS	2025	Veikkausliiga	20	1	0	0	2	0	—		—		22	1
Career total			133	5	8	0	2	0	0	0	3	0	146	5

== Honours ==
VVV-Venlo

- Eerste Divisie: 2016–17
