= Rintaro Tashima =

Japanese footballer

Personal information
- Date of birth: 8 April 1997 (age 29)
- Place of birth: Abiko, Japan
- Height: 1.75 m (5 ft 9 in)
- Position: Midfielder

Team information
- Current team: Dinamo Zagreb II

Youth career
- 2007–2013: Mitsubishi Yowa
- 2013–2014: A.C.B.B.
- 2014–2015: Mitsubishi Yowa
- 2015–2016: Keio University

Senior career*
Years	Team	Apps	(Gls)
2016–2017	VVV-Venlo	3	(0)
2017–2018	Dinamo Zagreb II	6	(0)
- * Club domestic league appearances and goals as of 16 July 2018

Rintaro Tashima (田嶋 凜太郎, Tashima Rintarō; born 8 April 1997) is a Japanese football player who last played for Dinamo Zagreb II.

== Club career ==
He made his professional debut in the Eerste Divisie for VVV-Venlo on 24 February 2017 in a game against Achilles '29.
