= Niels Fleuren =

Dutch footballer (born 1986)

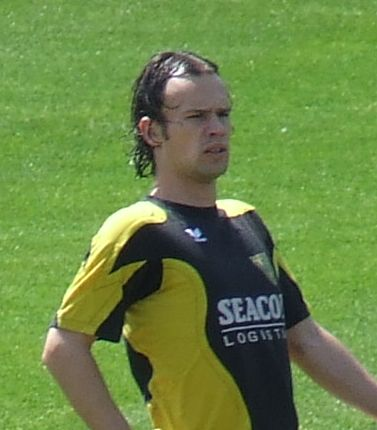

Personal information
- Date of birth: 1 November 1986 (age 40)
- Place of birth: Boxmeer, Netherlands
- Height: 1.76 m (5 ft 9 in)
- Position: Left-back

Youth career
- 1991–1997: Vitesse '08
- 1997–2003: VVV

Senior career*
Years	Team	Apps	(Gls)
2003–2016	VVV	354	(1)
2016–2017	Emmen	18	(0)
2017–2022	TOP Oss	118	(1)
2022	De Treffers	6	(0)
2023	Gemert	14	(0)
2023–2024	Vitesse '08		
Total		510	(2)
- * Club domestic league appearances and goals as of 10:21, 27 December 2023 (UTC)

Niels Fleuren (born 1 November 1986) is a Dutch retired footballer who played as a left-back.

== Career ==
=== VVV-Venlo ===
Born in Boxmeer, Fleuren grew up in Gennep and played in the youth departments of local amateur club Vitesse '08 and VVV-Venlo. Fleuren made his professional debut at the age of 16 for VVV-Venlo, as a substitute in a 4–0 win at home against Cambuur on 3 October 2003. He scored his only league goal for the club on 21 October 2005, at home against HFC Haarlem. In 2008, he received the Jan Klaassens Award, the annual VVV award for the best talent from their own youth academy. Over the years, the club attracted various players for the left-back position, including Youssef El Akchaoui, Jeffrey Leiwakabessy, Joeri Schroyen and Jason Bourdouxhe, but each time Fleuren emerged as the starter. In a home game against De Graafschap on 13 September 2013, Fleuren was honoured in connection with his 300th official match for VVV. He played his 300th league game against Sparta Rotterdam on 19 October 2014. He played his 400th official game against regional rivals MVV on 8 April 2016. VVV announced on 27 May 2016 that Fleuren's contract would not be extended.

Fleuren left VVV-Venlo in May 2016, after 13 seasons with the senior team. With 354 league appearances he was fifth in the club's appearance list. During his time at the club, he grew into a fan favourite and gained the nickname "The Maldini of De Koel".

=== Emmen and TOP Oss ===
On 15 July 2016, it was announced that Fleuren had signed a one-year contract with Emmen.

Ahead of the 2017–18 season, Fleuren joined TOP Oss on an amateur contract, where he soon developed into a regular starter and was rewarded with a one-year professional contract at the end of the season. In January 2019, he extended his contract with Oss by another year.

In the 2020–21 season, Fleuren would again play for TOP Oss in an amateur deal. In October 2020, Fleuren tested positive for SARS-CoV-2 during the COVID-19 pandemic. While in quarantine at home, he continued working as the TOP Oss contact person for social projects, where he organised activities such as a footgolf event for a clothing sponsor. He had been a part of the office staff of the club since signing an amateur playing contract.

=== Later career ===
On 22 June 2022, Fleuren joined Tweede Divisie club De Treffers on an amateur contract, after having decided to retire from professional football. After six months, he moved to Derde Divisie club Gemert on 1 January 2023.

In May 2023, he returned to his first club Vitesse '08 in the ninth-tier Vierde Klasse after 26 years. He retired after one season.

== Honours ==
VVV-Venlo

- Eerste Divisie: 2008–09
