= Aziz Khalouta =

Dutch-Moroccan footballer

Personal information
- Full name: Abdelaziz Khalouta
- Date of birth: 8 August 1989 (age 37)
- Place of birth: Fez, Morocco
- Height: 1.85 m (6 ft 1 in)
- Positions: Winger; forward

Team information
- Current team: De Treffers
- Number: 20

Youth career
- MAS Fez
- VVV '03
- VOS
- Venlosche Boys
- VVV-Venlo

Senior career*
Years	Team	Apps	(Gls)
2011–2012	VVV-Venlo	0	(0)
2012–2014	Fortuna Sittard	69	(24)
2014–2015	VVV-Venlo	34	(10)
2015	Pandurii Târgu Jiu	4	(0)
2016	FC Den Bosch	13	(4)
2016–2017	Fortuna Sittard	21	(4)
2017–2018	Moghreb Tétouan	15	(3)
2018–	De Treffers	9	(1)
- * Club domestic league appearances and goals as of 4 May 2019

Abdelaziz "Aziz" Khalouta (born 8 August 1989) is a Dutch-Moroccan professional footballer who plays for Tweede Divisie side De Treffers.
