= Robin Buwalda =

Dutch footballer

Personal information
- Date of birth: 17 August 1994 (age 32)
- Place of birth: Leidschendam, Netherlands
- Height: 1.88 m (6 ft 2 in)
- Position: Centre back

Team information
- Current team: Scheveningen

Youth career
- –2003: SEV Leidschendam
- 2003–2013: ADO Den Haag

Senior career*
Years	Team	Apps	(Gls)
2012–2016	ADO Den Haag	2	(0)
2014–2016	→ VVV-Venlo (loan)	61	(3)
2016–2019	NEC	21	(0)
2018	→ Go Ahead Eagles	18	(0)
2019–2021	IFK Mariehamn	58	(3)
2023–2025	Westlandia		
2025–	Scheveningen	0	(0)
- * Club domestic league appearances and goals as of 02:51, 4 August 2025 (UTC)

Robin Buwalda (born 17 August 1994) is a Dutch professional footballer who plays as a centre back for Vierde Divisie club Scheveningen.

== Club career ==
Buwalda began his career with ADO Den Haag and made his professional debut on 18 March 2012 in a 2–0 defeat against Ajax. ADO then loaned him to VVV-Venlo for two seasons and he joined NEC on a free transfer in summer 2016. He later had three seasons in Finland with IFK Mariehamn, before returning to the Netherlands to play for amateur side Westlandia. He was snapped up by Scheveningen in June 2025.
