= Leandro Resida =

Dutch footballer (born 1989)

Personal information
- Full name: Leandro Resida
- Date of birth: 11 October 1989 (age 37)
- Place of birth: Amsterdam, Netherlands
- Height: 1.70 m (5 ft 7 in)
- Position: Winger

Team information
- Current team: Rayong
- Number: 24

Youth career
- Ajax

Senior career*
Years	Team	Apps	(Gls)
2009–2011	Quick Boys		
2011–2012	FC Chabab		
2012–2013	Telstar	23	(1)
2013–2015	FC Emmen	71	(12)
2015–2017	VVV-Venlo	56	(6)
2017	RKC Waalwijk	1	(0)
2017–2018	Suwaiq Club	0	(0)
2018–2019	Chainat Hornbill	8	(1)
2020–	Rayong	3	(0)
- * Club domestic league appearances and goals as of 08:10, 7 May 2020 (UTC)

Leandro Resida (born 11 October 1989) is a Dutch professional footballer who played as a winger for Rayong in Thai League 1. He formerly played for Telstar and FC Emmen.

== Career ==
In 2017, Resida played for Suwaiq Club in Oman.

== Personal life ==
Born in the Netherlands, Resida is of Surinamese descent.
