= Evren Korkmaz =

Turkish footballer (born 1997)

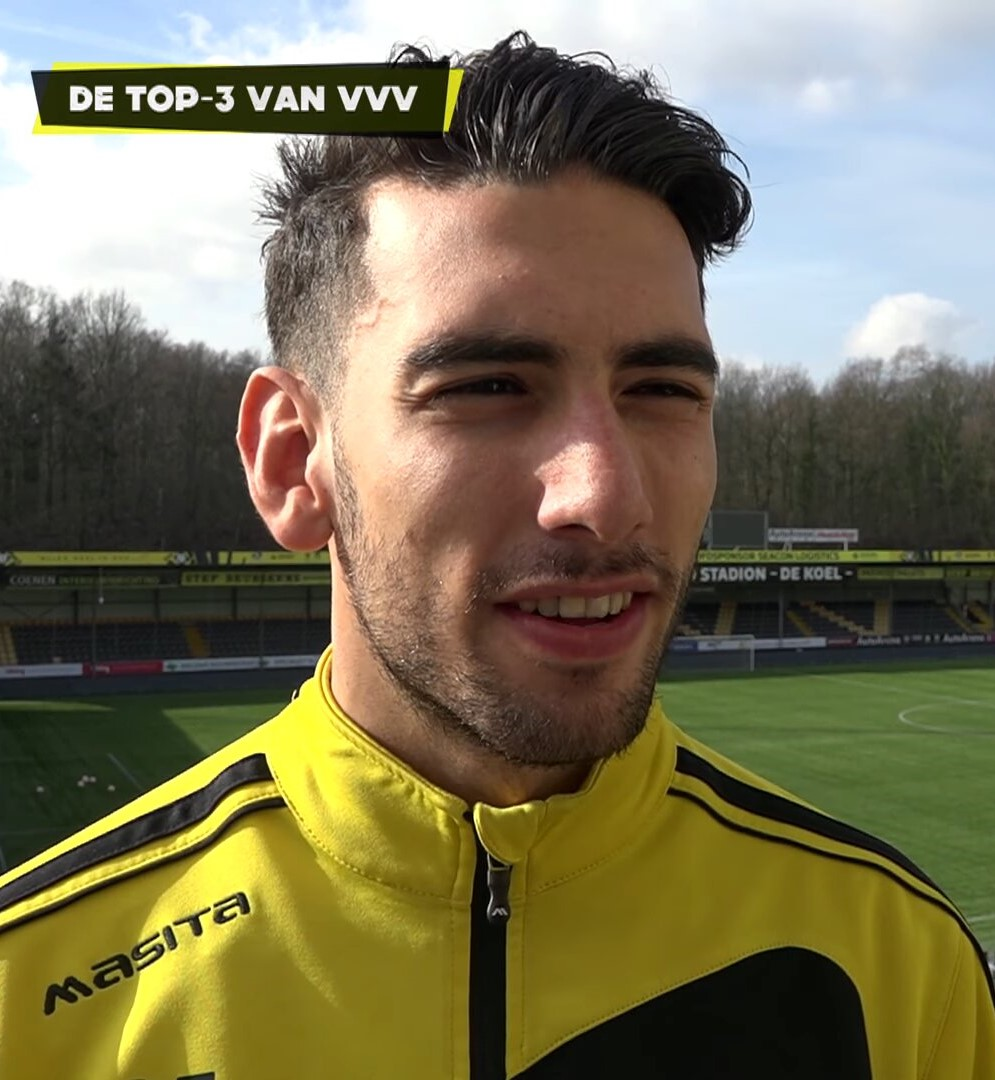
- Korkmaz in 2019

Personal information
- Date of birth: 27 April 1997 (age 29)
- Place of birth: Venlo, Netherlands
- Height: 1.84 m (6 ft 0 in)
- Position: Defender

Team information
- Current team: Sakaryaspor
- Number: 23

Youth career
- 2003–2006: SV Blerick
- 2006–2015: VVV-Venlo

Senior career*
Years	Team	Apps	(Gls)
2015–2019	VVV-Venlo	17	(0)
2017	→ Den Bosch (loan)	2	(0)
2019–2024	Adanaspor	108	(3)
2024–2026	Batman Petrolspor	26	(0)
2026–	Sakaryaspor	4	(1)
- * Club domestic league appearances and goals as of 1 October 2026

Evren Korkmaz (born 27 April 1997) is a Turkish professional footballer who plays as a defender for Turkish club Sakaryaspor.

== Club career ==
Born in Venlo to Turkish parents, Korkmaz made his professional debut in the Eerste Divisie for VVV-Venlo on 1 April 2016 in a game against FC Den Bosch as a substitute for Sam Westley.

== Honours ==
=== Club ===
VVV-Venlo

- Eerste Divisie: 2016–17
