= Jordy Deckers =

Dutch footballer (born 1989)

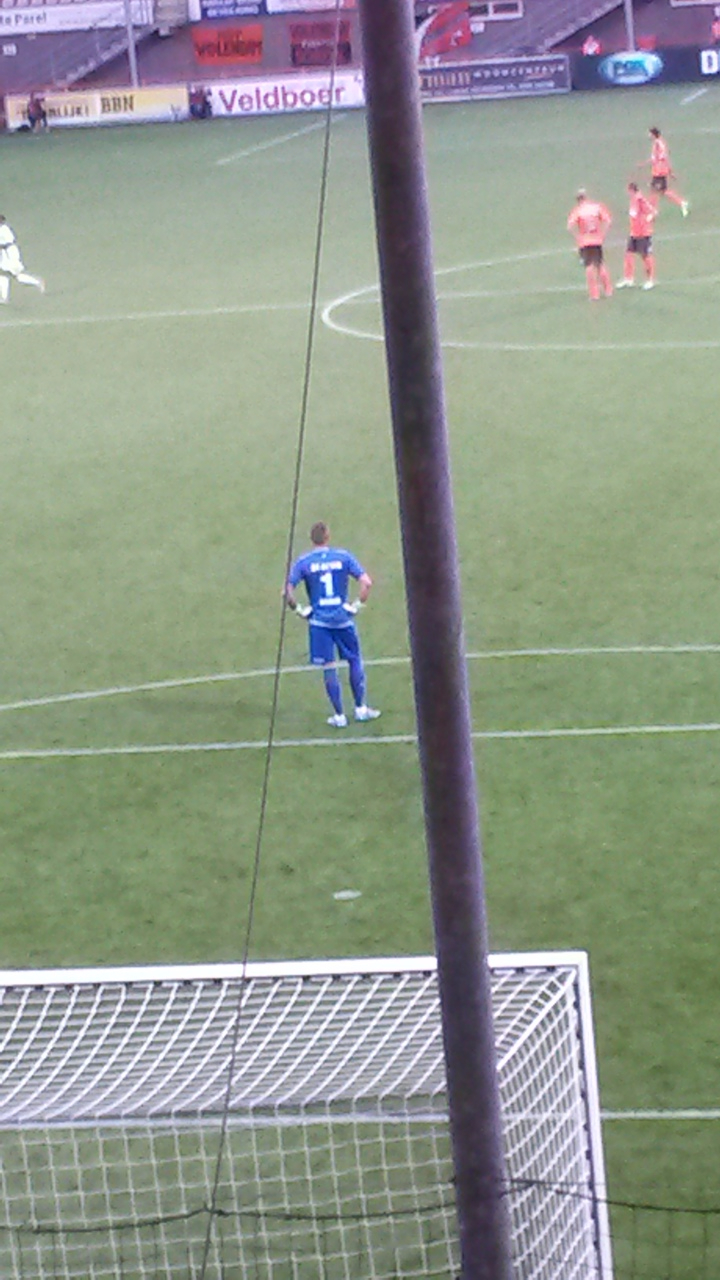

Personal information
- Full name: Jordy Deckers
- Date of birth: 20 June 1989 (age 37)
- Place of birth: Amsterdam, Netherlands
- Height: 1.90 m (6 ft 3 in)
- Position: Goalkeeper

Youth career
- JOS
- Ajax
- AZ

Senior career*
Years	Team	Apps	(Gls)
2008–2010	AZ	0	(0)
2009–2010	→ Telstar (loan)	2	(0)
2010–2011	Ajax	0	(0)
2011–2015	Excelsior	73	(1)
2015–2016	VVV	36	(0)
2016	Ermis Aradippou	1	(0)
2016–2017	TOP Oss	19	(0)
2017–2018	RKC	3	(0)
2018–2020	Spakenburg	6	(0)
2020–2024	Veensche Boys		
- * Club domestic league appearances and goals as of 6 January 2023

Jordy Deckers (born 20 June 1989) is a Dutch retired footballer who played as a goalkeeper.

== Club career ==
He formerly played for AZ, Telstar, Ajax, Excelsior and VVV-Venlo. At Excelsior, he made a blatant mistake against Go Ahead Eagles when opposite goalkeeper Erik Cummins scored out of a goalkick.

He joined FC Oss in September 2016, after a summer 2016 move to Cypriot side Ermis Aradippou did not work out and he was released after only three months.

== Post-playing career ==
After retiring as a player, Deckers became a firefighter. He was also appointed goalkeeper coach at Veensche Boys.
