= Jason Bourdouxhe =

Belgian footballer (born 1991)

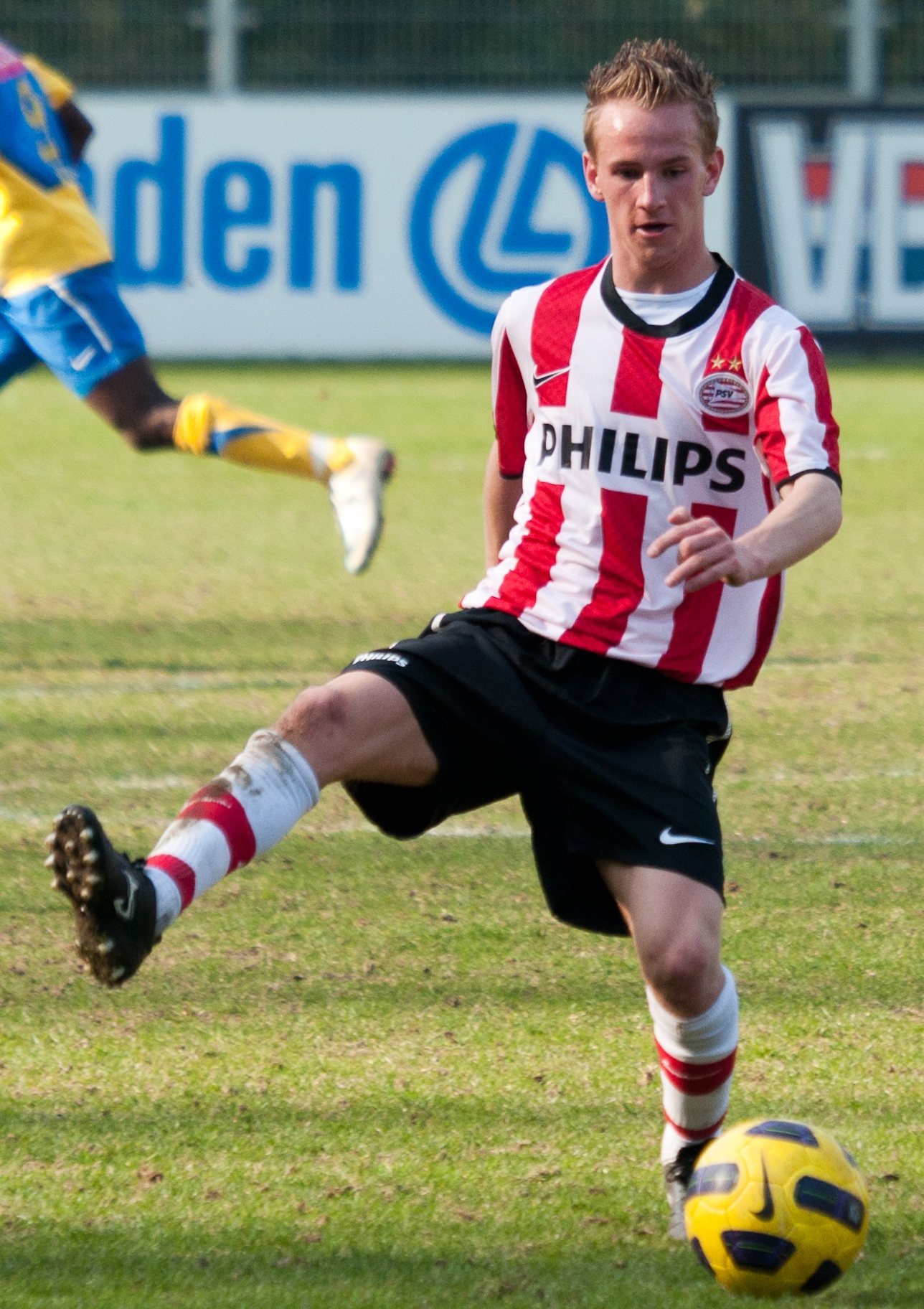
- Bourdouxhe playing for PSV in 2011

Personal information
- Full name: Jason Freddy Bourdouxhe
- Date of birth: 11 April 1991 (age 35)
- Place of birth: Fléron, Belgium
- Height: 1.73 m (5 ft 8 in)
- Position: Left midfielder

Team information
- Current team: TEC
- Number: 23

Youth career
- RA Melen-Micheroux
- RFC Liège
- Mechelen
- 2003–2012: PSV

Senior career*
Years	Team	Apps	(Gls)
2012–2013	PSV	0	(0)
2012–2013	→ Eindhoven (loan)	11	(3)
2013–2015	Eindhoven	66	(5)
2015–2016	VVV-Venlo	15	(0)
2016–2018	Helmond Sport	59	(3)
2018–2019	Emmen	0	(0)
2019–2020	TOP Oss	6	(0)
2020–2021	Eindhoven	28	(0)
2021–2022	Mouscron	18	(0)
2022–2023	Rupel Boom	32	(3)
2023–2024	Turnhout	1	(0)
2024–2025	KFC De Kempen	13	(1)
2025–	TEC	15	(0)

International career
2006	Belgium U15	7	(1)
2006–2007	Belgium U16	14	(0)
2007–2008	Belgium U17	13	(0)
2008–2009	Belgium U18	8	(4)
2009–2010	Belgium U19	15	(2)
2010	Belgium U20	1	(0)
- * Club domestic league appearances and goals as of 5 August 2025

Jason Freddy Bourdouxhe (born 11 April 1991) is a Belgian footballer who plays as a midfielder for TEC.

== Club career ==
Bourdouxhe progressed through the youth system of Dutch club PSV, but never made an appearance for the first team. He was loaned out to second-tier Eerste Divisie club FC Eindhoven in 2012, who then signed him on a permanent deal a year later. On 10 August 2012, he made his professional debut against MVV Maastricht, where he also scored his first goal.

After his two-year contract expired, Bourdouxhe joined VVV-Venlo on a free, where he signed at two-year deal with an option for an extra year. He failed to establish himself as a starter in Venlo, and he left for Helmond Sport after only one season. There, Bourdouxhe signed a two-year contract. After two seasons in Helmond, he moved to FC Emmen, where he made no first-team appearances and only managed to appear for the reserve team.

On 16 April 2019, Bourdouxhe signed a two-year contract with TOP Oss. Upon signing, he stated that "TOP Oss has grown considerably in recent years and the club has been doing well for the last two seasons [...] In addition, I have a good feeling after talking to the manager. We have the same view on football. It is also nice to be able to be closer to my family in Eindhoven again". He made his debut for the club on 9 August 2019, starting at left back against Jong Ajax, a match which TOP managed to win 2–1. Bourdouxhe was, however, mostly used as a backup on the position behind Niels Fleuren, and finished his first season in Oss with six total appearances. Close to the transfer deadline of 2020, he left TOP Oss and decided to return to FC Eindhoven.

On 11 August 2021, Bourdouxhe returned to Belgium for the first time in his senior career and signed a contract for one-year (with an additional year option) with Mouscron. In June 2022, he signed for Rupel Boom. At the age of 31, he became the oldest player in the team's squad.

After one season, he moved to Belgian Division 3 club Turnhout.
