= Selman Sevinç =

Footballer (born 1995)

Personal information
- Date of birth: 12 April 1995 (age 31)
- Place of birth: Venlo, Netherlands
- Height: 1.77 m (5 ft 10 in)
- Position: Midfielder

Team information
- Current team: De Treffers
- Number: 14

Youth career
- SV Blerick
- VVV-Venlo

Senior career*
Years	Team	Apps	(Gls)
2013–2016	VVV-Venlo	47	(3)
2016–2018	Osmanlıspor	0	(0)
2016–2017	→ Bugsaşspor (loan)	29	(1)
2017–2018	→ Bugsaşspor (loan)	4	(0)
2018–2019	Diyarbakırspor	0	(0)
2019	SV Straelen II	10	(8)
2019	SV Straelen	1	(0)
2019–2021	Darıca Gençlerbirliği	55	(4)
2021	Bayrampaşa	13	(1)
2022–2024	VSF Amern	60	(13)
2024	De Treffers	9	(0)
2024–	VSF Amern	31	(13)
- * Club domestic league appearances and goals as of 15:56, 4 March 2026 (UTC)

Selman Sevinç (born 12 April 1995) is a professional footballer who plays as a midfielder for Landesliga Niederrhein club VSF Amern. Born in the Netherlands, he represented for Turkey at youth international level.

== Career ==
In July 2016, he joined Osmanlıspor.

On 31 January 2019, Sevinç joined German club SV Straelen on a contract for the rest of the season.

On 24 July 2019, Sevinç joined Darıca Gençlerbirliği in the Turkish third division.

On 1 July 2024, Sevinç returned to the Netherlands, where he signed with Tweede Divisie club De Treffers. After only a few months there, he returned to Landesliga Niederrhein club VSF Amern in December 2024.
