= Dyon Gijzen =

Dutch footballer

Personal information
- Date of birth: 16 February 1994 (age 32)
- Place of birth: Roermond, Netherlands
- Height: 1.76 m (5 ft 9 in)
- Position: Forward

Youth career
- Brachtersbeek
- Linne
- VVV

Senior career*
Years	Team	Apps	(Gls)
2013–2016	VVV	37	(4)
2016–2017	MVV	21	(5)
2017–2018	De Treffers	13	(1)
2018–2019	Eendracht Termien	25	(0)
2019	Germania Teveren	13	(2)
2020	Meerssen	5	(0)
2020–2021	EHC		
- * Club domestic league appearances and goals as of 20:46, 4 February 2021 (UTC)

Dyon Gijzen (born 16 February 1994 in Roermond) is a Dutch footballer who most recently played as a forward for EHC.

After Gijzen made his professional debut for Eerste Divisie club VVV-Venlo, he moved to MVV in 2016 in order to get more playing time. He later signed for amateur side De Treffers. He joined EHC from SV Meerssen, whom he had joined from German Landesliga side Germania Teveren, in 2020.
