= Gianluca Nijholt =

Dutch footballer

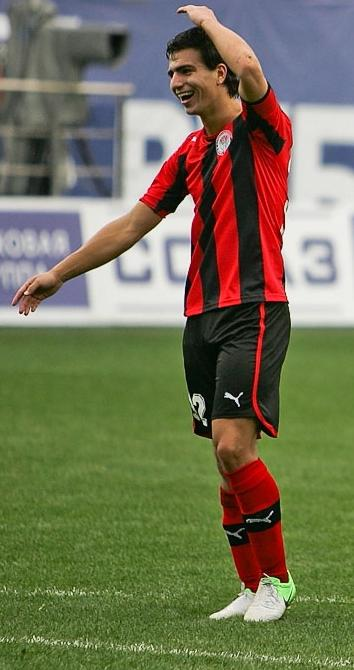
- Nijholt with Amkar Perm in 2012

Personal information
- Date of birth: 14 February 1990 (age 36)
- Place of birth: Utrecht, Netherlands
- Position: Midfielder

Youth career
- Utrecht

Senior career*
Years	Team	Apps	(Gls)
2007–2012	Utrecht	40	(1)
2012	→ Almere City (loan)	15	(7)
2012–2014	Amkar Perm	15	(0)
2015–2016	VVV-Venlo	51	(8)
2016–2019	NAC Breda	47	(3)

International career
2011	Netherlands U21	1	(0)
- * Club domestic league appearances and goals

Gianluca Nijholt (born 14 February 1990) is a Dutch former professional footballer who played as a midfielder. He played for FC Utrecht, Almere City, FC Amkar Perm, VVV-Venlo and NAC Breda.

== Personal ==
His father is ex-player Luc Nijholt.
