= Quin Kruijsen =

Dutch footballer (born 1990)

Personal information
- Full name: Quin Kruijsen
- Date of birth: 17 November 1990 (age 35)
- Place of birth: Venlo, Netherlands
- Height: 1.82 m (6 ft 0 in)
- Position: Midfielder

Youth career
- VVV-Venlo

Senior career*
Years	Team	Apps	(Gls)
2011–2016	VVV-Venlo	94	(1)
2012–2013	→ Fortuna Sittard (loan)	26	(0)
Total		120	(1)
- * Club domestic league appearances and goals

Quin Kruijsen (born 17 November 1990) is a Dutch former professional footballer who played as a midfielder.

== Career ==
Born in Venlo, he made his professional debut for his hometown club on 19 January 2011, as part of a 2–1 defeat to FC Utrecht.

In March 2017, he joined German club lower league side VfR Fischeln.
