= Sam Westley =

English footballer (born 1994)

Personal information
- Full name: Samuel Edward Westley
- Date of birth: 4 February 1994 (age 32)
- Place of birth: Luton, England
- Position: Defender

Youth career
- –2012: Birmingham City
- 2012–2014: Stoke City
- 2014: Ipswich Town
- 2014–2015: West Ham United

Senior career*
Years	Team	Apps	(Gls)
2015–2017	West Ham United	0	(0)
2015–2016	→ VVV-Venlo (loan)	1	(0)
Total		1	(0)
- * Club domestic league appearances and goals

Samuel Edward Westley (born 4 February 1994) is an English former footballer who played as a defender.

== Career ==
Westley started out at Birmingham City as a schoolboy player before joining Stoke City in the summer of 2012. He was a member of their Development Squad between 2012–14 and made five appearances for the team. In early 2014 he spent time with Ipswich Town before joining West Ham United in the summer of 2014. Westley was an unused substitute for both legs of the UEFA Europa League first qualifying round against Andorran side Lusitanos and shortly afterwards, on 31 August 2015, he joined Dutch side VVV-Venlo on a season-long loan. He made his Eerste Divisie debut for VVV-Venlo on 1 April 2016, in a 2–1 win against Den Bosch. He was released by West Ham at the end of the 2016–17 season without having played for the club.

Westley announced his retirement as a player after being released, instead choosing to focus on a career as a sports agent.

He subsequently became a under-14s coach at Crystal Palace and in 2024 he graduated from Staffordshire University with a first-class degree in Sport and Exercise Psychology.
