= Danny Post =

Dutch footballer (born 1989)

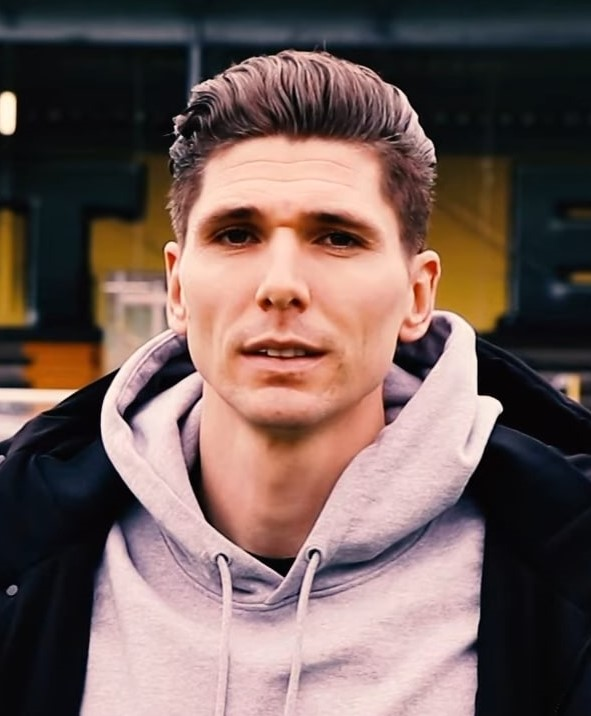
- Post in 2022

Personal information
- Date of birth: 7 April 1989 (age 37)
- Place of birth: Amsterdam, Netherlands
- Position: Midfielder

Senior career*
Years	Team	Apps	(Gls)
2008–2009	Haarlem	14	(0)
2009–2011	Groningen	1	(0)
2010	→ Cambuur (loan)	2	(0)
2011–2013	Dordrecht	50	(4)
2013–2022	VVV-Venlo	234	(11)
2022–2024	Almere City	24	(2)
- * Club domestic league appearances and goals

Danny Post (born 7 April 1989) is a Dutch former professional footballer who played as a midfielder.

== Career ==
Born in Amsterdam, Post has played for Haarlem, FC Groningen, SC Cambuur, FC Dordrecht and VVV-Venlo.

On 29 January 2022, Post signed a contract with Almere City until June 2024.
