= Moreno Rutten =

Dutch footballer (born 1993)

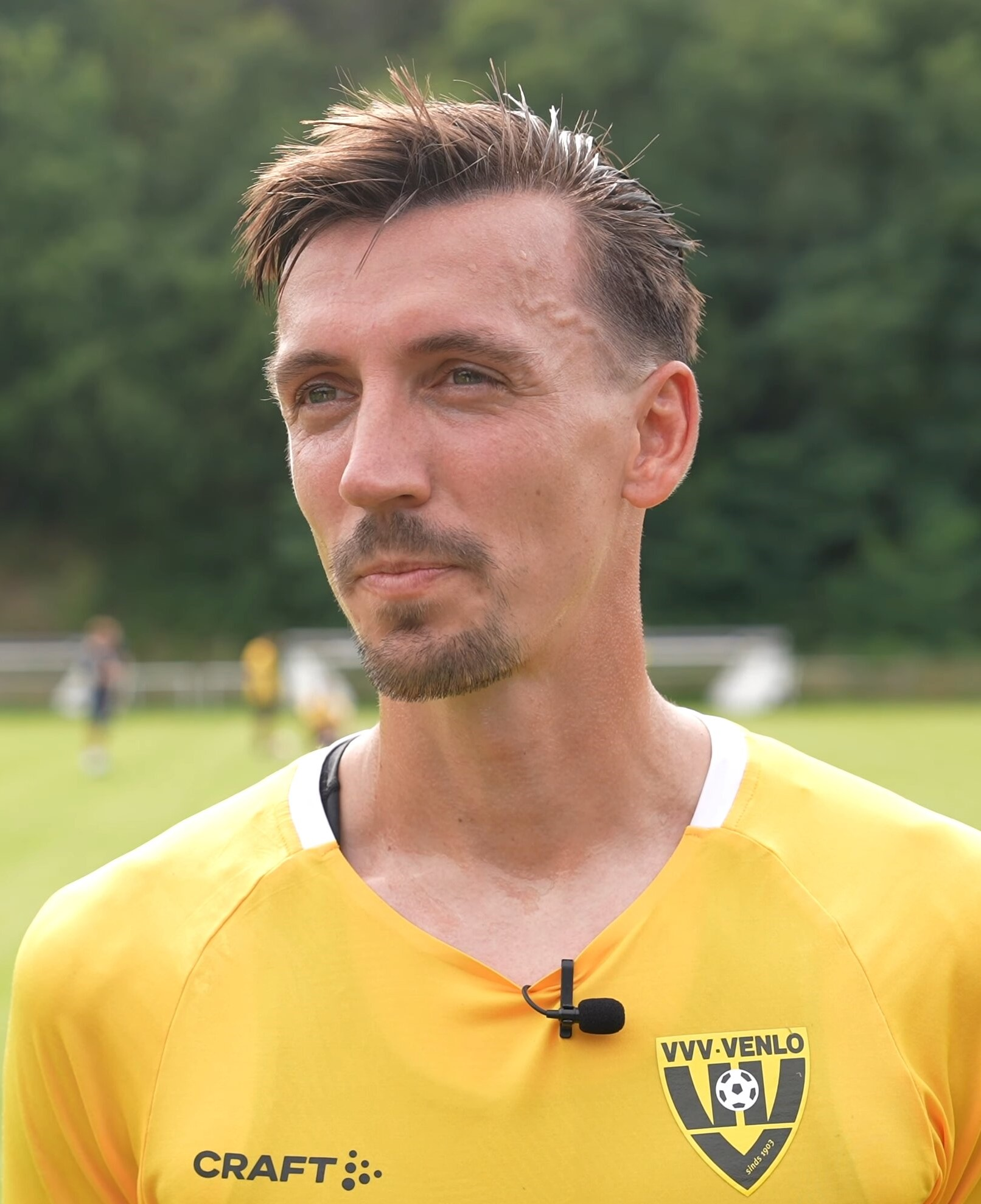
- Rutten in 2023

Personal information
- Full name: Moreno Gyoezoe Rutten
- Date of birth: 28 April 1993 (age 33)
- Place of birth: 's-Hertogenbosch, Netherlands
- Height: 1.77 m (5 ft 10 in)
- Position: Right-back

Team information
- Current team: Wezel Sport

Youth career
- Willem II
- Feyenoord

Senior career*
Years	Team	Apps	(Gls)
2012–2015	Den Bosch	92	(1)
2015–2019	VVV-Venlo	88	(2)
2019–2020	Crotone	4	(0)
2020–2023	NAC Breda	45	(2)
2023–2024	VVV-Venlo	26	(0)
2024–	Wezel Sport	12	(0)
- * Club domestic league appearances and goals as of 10:59, 23 March 2025 (UTC)

Moreno Gyoezoe Rutten (born 28 April 1993) is a Dutch footballer who plays as a right-back for Belgian Division 2 club Wezel Sport. He formerly played for Den Bosch, Crotone, NAC Breda, and VVV-Venlo.

== Club career ==
On 17 June 2019, he signed a three-year contract with the Italian club Crotone.

On 10 August 2023, Rutten returned to VVV-Venlo on a one-year deal.

On 30 May 2024, Rutten was announced as Belgian Division 2 side Wezel Sport's new signing ahead of the 2024–25 season. Joining the fourth-division club alongside fellow Dutchman Niek Vossebelt, the transfer also marked both players' retirement from professional football.

== Honours ==
VVV-Venlo

- Eerste Divisie: 2016–17
