= De Koel =

Stadium in Venlo, Limburg, Netherlands

Seacon Stadion – De Koel –
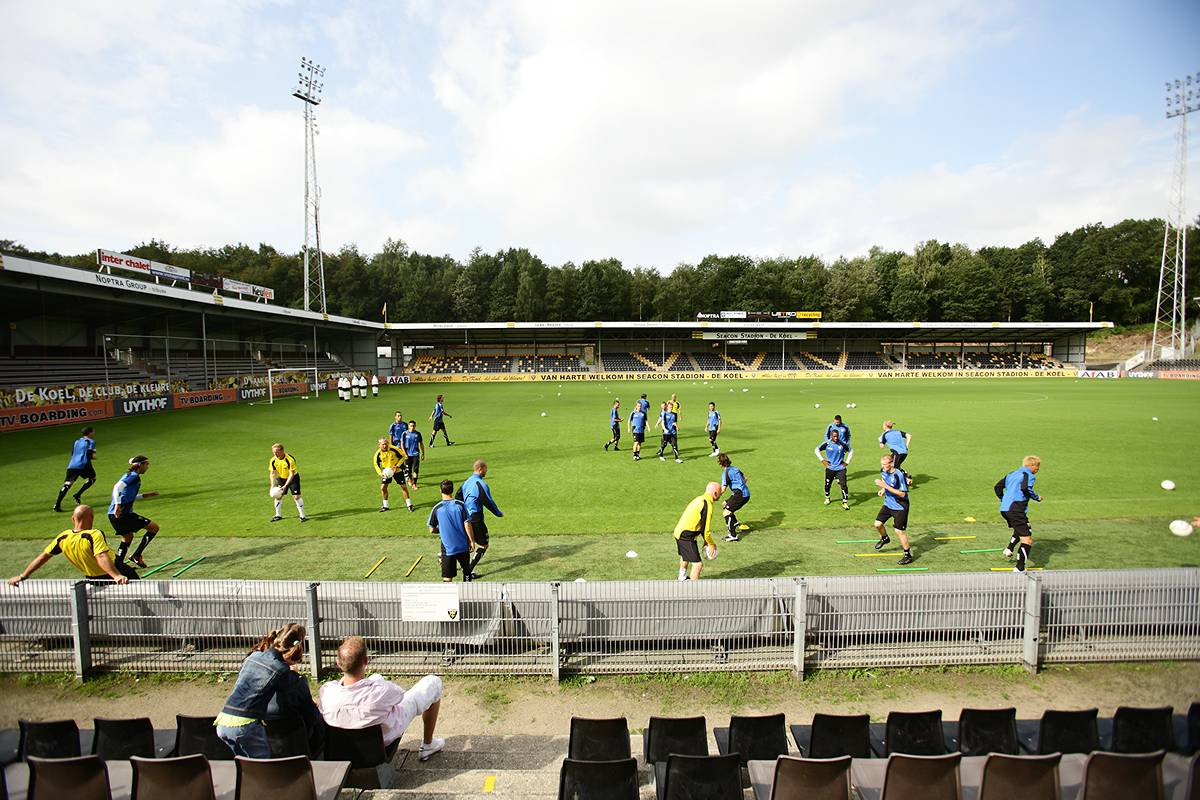
- Inside the stadium
- Interactive map of Seacon Stadion – De Koel –
- Full name: Seacon Stadion – De Koel –
- Former names: De Koel (1972–present); Seacon Stadion (2005–2019); Covebo Stadion (2019–2025); Seacon Stadion (2025–present)
- Location: Venlo, Limburg
- Coordinates: 51°21′07″N 6°10′47″E
- Owner: VVV-Venlo
- Capacity: 8,000
- Surface: Natural grass
- Record attendance: 24,500 (vs. Ajax, 13 March 1977)
- Field size: 105 by 68 metres (114.8 yd × 74.4 yd)

Construction
- Built: 1971–1972
- Opened: 15 December 1974; 51 years ago
- Renovated: 2003, 2007

Tenants
- VVV-Venlo (1972–present); VVV-Venlo Women (2010–2012)

De Koel (Dutch pronunciation: [də ˈkul]), also known as Seacon Stadion – De Koel –, is a multi-purpose stadium in Venlo, Limburg, Netherlands. It is currently mostly used for football matches and is the home stadium of VVV-Venlo. The stadium is able to hold 8,000 spectators, and was built in 1972.

== Background ==
The stadium is located near the former Stadium De Kraal in a pit ("koel" is Venlo Limburgish for "pit") on Kaldenkerkerweg, on top of the steep fringe in the east of Venlo. The stadium was once able to accommodate 24,500 spectators during a match between VVV and Ajax in 1977. When Dutch competitive football experienced a dip in public interest in the late 1980s, De Koel managed to keep their spectator numbers up to standard. Behind PSV, Feyenoord and Ajax, De Koel reached some of the highest spectator numbers of the then Eredivisie.

== Name and sponsorships ==
Following a major renovation completed in 2003, De Koel was renamed Seacon Stadion – De Koel – in 2005 as part of a naming-rights agreement with the club's main sponsor. After 14 years, the naming rights changed hands, and on 14 January 2019 the stadium was renamed Covebo Stadion – De Koel – under a sponsorship agreement running through the 2020–21 season. That agreement was extended for another year in January 2021 until the 2021–22 season.

In June 2025, VVV-Venlo announced that Seacon would return as the stadium's naming sponsor, with the venue reverting to the name Seacon Stadion – De Koel – for the 2025–26 and 2026–27 seasons.

== Structure, facilities and future plans ==
Not only is the location famous, but the long staircase from which players descend from the dressing rooms to the playing field is also famous. This staircase was therefore the subject of a mini-documentary produced by the VPRO program Holland Sport in 2009. It is also one of the last stadiums in the Netherlands that still has terracing.

In the long term, VVV-Venlo have considered building a new stadium at a different location. For a long time, the former barracks site in the Blerick district was considered. Plans were, however, discontinued in early December 2013, after it became clear that the revised zoning plan would only allow football in the evenings. VVV would therefore make improvements to the De Koel in the coming years. For the 2007–08 season, the stadium was thoroughly renovated to prepare it for modern Eredivisie standards. Due to the renovations, the capacity was considerably reduced to around 8,000.

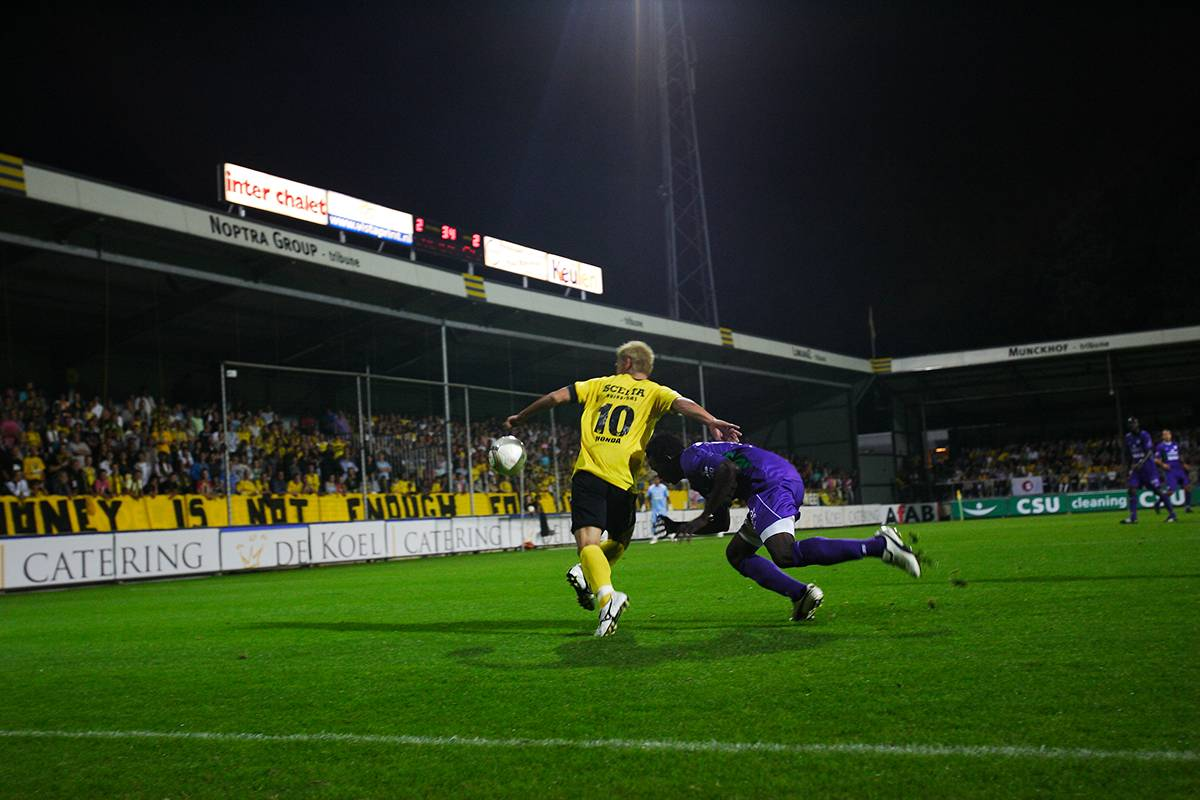
Keisuke Honda of VVV-Venlo in action during the Eredivisie match between VVV and Groningen at De Koel on 22 August 2009

In June 2017, VVV developed plans to build a new stadium at the location of De Koel. The estimated costs (€12.5 million) would have to be invested by the business community. Six months later, VVV reached an agreement with the municipality of Venlo, owner of land and buildings around the stadium, about the purchase price of €545,000. As a new landowner, the club started working on the desired renovation of the stadium. After his retirement as club chairman, Hai Berden was appointed 'construction curate' and VVV announced on 29 June 2018 that the East Stand in De Koel would be named after him and henceforth known as the "Hai Berden tribune".

In June 2018, VVV commenced phase 1 of the renovation, which was estimated to cost a total of €6 million. In addition, some facilities (such as parking lot, toilets, catering and the new roof of the South Stand) would be improved and at the end of the year the construction of a new entrance was started, in which the ticketing, the fan shop, a museum and more workplaces for administrative staff would be accommodated. At the end of the 2018–19 season, the East Stand would be rebuilt with 800 additional seats and equipped with a fan café. After this first phase, the renovation would take place in the form of a multi-year project that must be completed within 15 years at the latest. The ultimate goal is a compact stadium with closed corners and an ultimate capacity of 12,000 covered seats. In May 2019, it turned out that some of the plans had to be postponed, including the renovation of the East Stand. The main reason was that the financing had not yet been finalised.

== Pitch ==
In the 2012–13 season, the pitch of De Koel, which in 2009 was voted the best pitch in the Eerste Divisie, was in poor condition, so much so it was listed as last in the "VVCS Fields Competition", a classification compiled by the eighteen chairmen of the Eredivisie clubs. VVV thus opted to replace the turf with an artificial turf. On 30 July 2013, it was announced that the synthetic turf pitch had been approved and met the requirements of the Royal Dutch Football Association (KNVB) and UEFA. On 9 August 2013, VVV played its first league match on this pitch against Willem II (2–0 win).

In May 2020, VVV chose to abandon the synthetic turf pitch again after seven years. From the 2020–21 season, there would again be natural grass in De Koel again.
