= Johnatan Opoku =

Dutch footballer (born 1990)

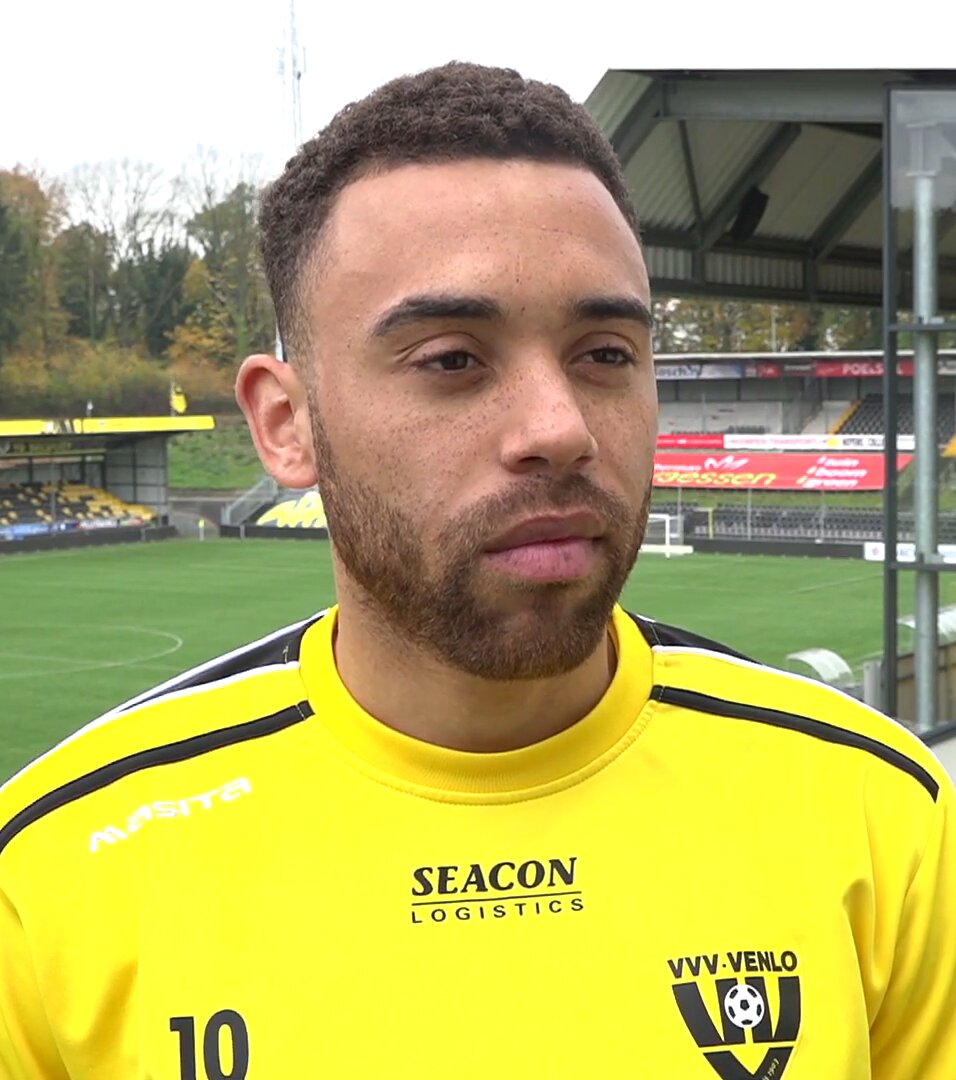
- Opoku in 2017

Personal information
- Full name: Johnatan Opoku Agyemang
- Date of birth: 18 April 1990 (age 36)
- Place of birth: Zutphen, Netherlands
- Height: 1.85 m (6 ft 1 in)
- Position: Attacking midfielder

Team information
- Current team: MASV

Youth career
- FC Zutphen
- VDZ
- Rheden
- RKHVV

Senior career*
Years	Team	Apps	(Gls)
2011–2013	SC Veendam	53	(11)
2013–2015	FC Oss	64	(22)
2015–2020	VVV-Venlo	127	(35)
2020–2022	De Graafschap	61	(9)
2022–2023	Jeddah		
2024–	MASV		
- * Club domestic league appearances and goals

Johnatan Opoku (born 18 April 1990) is a Dutch footballer who plays as an attacking midfielder for Vierde Divisie club MASV.

== Career ==
On 13 September 2022, Opoku joined Saudi Arabian club Jeddah.

Opoku joined amateur club MASV in January 2024, competing in the Vierde Divisie.

== Personal life ==
Born in the Netherlands, Opoku is of Ghanaian descent.
