= Ralf Seuntjens =

Dutch footballer (born 1989)

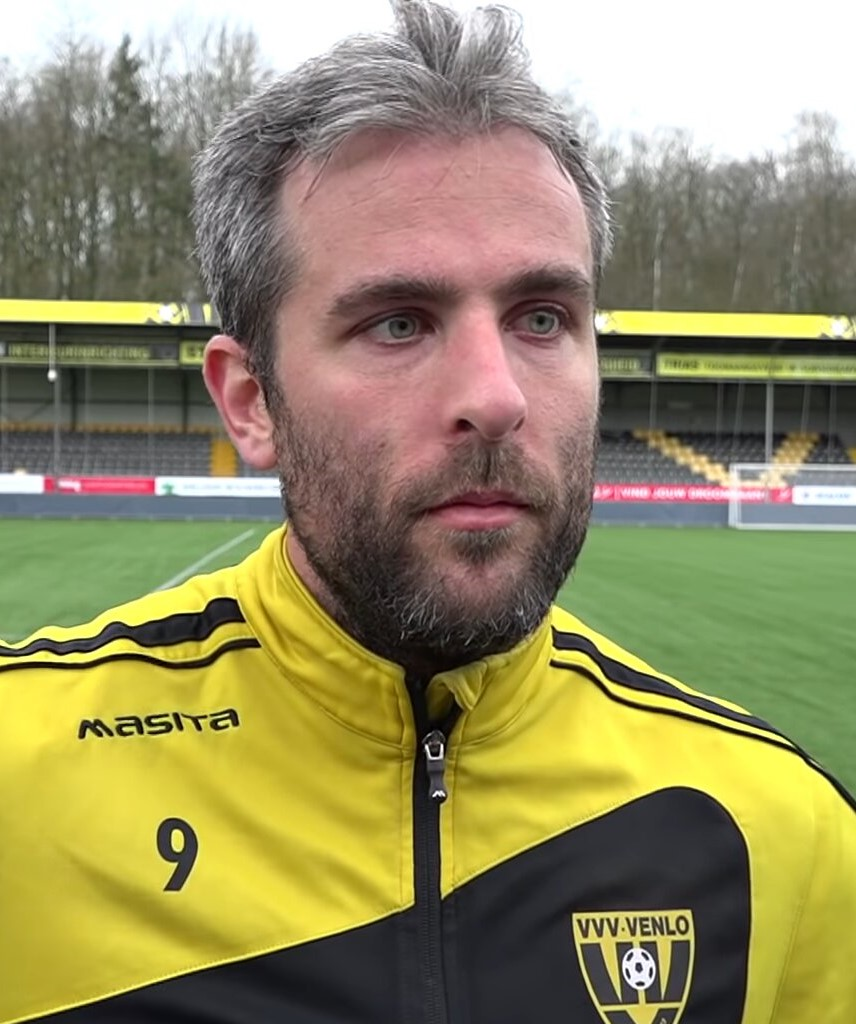
- Seuntjens in 2019

Personal information
- Date of birth: 17 April 1989 (age 37)
- Place of birth: Breda, Netherlands
- Height: 1.94 m (6 ft 4 in)
- Position: Striker

Team information
- Current team: Lommel
- Number: 30

Youth career
- –2007: BSV Boeimeer
- 2007–2008: RBC Roosendaal

Senior career*
Years	Team	Apps	(Gls)
2008–2011	RBC Roosendaal	61	(8)
2011–2014	FC Den Bosch	87	(19)
2014–2015	Telstar	36	(17)
2015–2019	VVV-Venlo	135	(49)
2019–2021	De Graafschap	64	(30)
2021–2022	NAC Breda	27	(12)
2022–2023	FC Imabari	12	(2)
2024–2025	De Graafschap	53	(10)
2025–	Lommel	32	(19)
- * Club domestic league appearances and goals as of 8 August 2026

Ralf Seuntjens (Dutch pronunciation: [ˈrɑl(ə)f ˈsøːɲtɕəns]; born 17 April 1989) is a Dutch professional footballer who plays as a striker for Belgian Pro League club Lommel.

== Club career ==
Seuntjens formerly played for RBC Roosendaal, FC Den Bosch and Telstar. In April 2016, he was crowned the Eerste Divisie top goalscorer of the 2015–16 season with 28 goals.

On 11 March 2021, it was announced that Seuntjens had signed a two-year contract with an option for an additional year with NAC Breda, starting from the 2021–22 season.

On 25 March 2022, Seuntjens joined FC Imabari in the Japanese third-tier J3 League. He was diagnosed with Non-Hodgkin lymphoma in May 2022, and therefore ruled out for a substantial time. He made his return to the pitch after beating cancer on 17 June 2023, coming on as a substitute shortly before full-time in a league match against Tegevajaro Miyazaki.

On 24 December 2023, it was announced that Seuntjens would be returning to De Graafschap, effective 1 January 2024, after signing a six-month contract. He remained with the club through the 2024–25 season. Upon the expiry of his contract, De Graafschap opted not to renew, and Seuntjens left the club as a free agent.

On 10 July 2025, Seuntjens signed a one-year contract with Lommel in Belgian second tier.

== Personal life ==
His younger brother Mats Seuntjens is also a professional footballer.

On 12 May 2022, a neoplasm was discovered after a medical examination on Seuntjens' shoulder. On 17 June, he wrote on Instagram that a diagnosis had been made, and that he was to undergo treatment. The diagnosis was later revealed to be Non-Hodgkin lymphoma. In January 2023, he was declared cancer-free.

== Honours ==
VVV-Venlo

- Eerste Divisie: 2016–17

Individual

- Eerste Divisie top scorer: 2015–16
