= Torino Hunte =

Dutch footballer (born 1990)

Personal information
- Full name: Torino Marciano Silvano Hunte
- Date of birth: 14 December 1990 (age 35)
- Place of birth: Goirle, Netherlands
- Height: 1.84 m (6 ft 0 in)
- Position: Winger

Youth career
- SC Olympus
- RKTVV
- SV Triborgh
- Longa
- Oss '20
- RKC
- Willem II
- UNA

Senior career*
Years	Team	Apps	(Gls)
2013–2015	Eindhoven	54	(5)
2015–2018	VVV	97	(13)
2018–2020	Almere City	35	(2)
2020–2021	VVV	21	(2)
2022	Den Bosch	11	(0)
2022	Politehnica Iași	10	(0)
2023–2024	De Treffers	33	(2)
2024-2025	DVS '33	0	(0)
2025	→ Unicum Lelystad (loan)		
- * Club domestic league appearances and goals as of 06:19, 10 October 2024 (UTC)

Torino Marciano Silvano Hunte (born 14 December 1990) is a Dutch retired footballer who played as a winger. He formerly played for FC Eindhoven, Almere City, VVV-Venlo and FC Den Bosch as well as for a considerable amount of amateur sides in his youth.

== Club career ==
Hunte returned to VVV in October 2018 after a season at Almere City. On 31 January 2022, Hunte signed with FC Den Bosch until the end of the season.

On 27 June 2022, he signed with Politehnica Iași in Romania.

Hunte returned to the Netherlands in January 2023, signing with Tweede Divisie club De Treffers. He moved to DVS '33 in summer 2024, only to be loaned out to Unicum Lelystad after half a season.

== Personal life ==
Born in the Netherlands, Hunte is of Surinamese descent.
