= List of foreign football players in the Netherlands =

This is a list of foreign players in the Eredivisie, which commenced play in 1956. The following players must meet both of the following two criteria:

1. Have played at least one Eredivisie game. Players who were signed by Eredivisie clubs, but only played in lower league, cup and/or European games, or did not play in any competitive games at all, are not included.
2. Are considered foreign, i.e., outside the Netherlands, determined by the following:

A player is considered foreign if he is not eligible to play for the national teams of the Netherlands.

More specifically,

- If a player has been capped on international level, the national team is used; if he has been capped by more than one country, the highest level (or the most recent) team is used. These include Dutch players with dual citizenship.
- If a player has not been capped on international level, his country of birth is used, except those who were born abroad from Dutch parents or moved to the Netherlands at a young age, and those who clearly indicated to have switched his nationality to another nation.

Clubs listed are those for which the player has played at least one Eredivisie game—and seasons are those in which the player has played at least one Eredivisie game. Note that seasons, not calendar years, are used. For example, "1992–95" indicates that the player has played in every season from 1992–93 to 1994–95, but not necessarily every calendar year from 1992 to 1995. Therefore, a player should always have a listing under at least two years — for instance, a player making his debut in 2011, during the 2011–12 season, will have '2011–12' after his name. This follows general practice in expressing sporting seasons.

In bold: players who have played at least one Eredivisie game in the (2023–24) season, and the clubs they have played for. They include players who have subsequently left the club, but do not include current players of an Eredivisie club who have not played an Eredivisie game in the current season.

== Afghanistan ==
- Shabir Isoufi – Excelsior – 2010–11
- Qays Shayesteh – Heracles – 2008–10
- Farshad Noor – Roda JC – 2015–16

== Albania ==
- Armando Broja – Vitesse – 2020–21
- Lindon Selahi – Twente, Willem II – 2019–21
- Vasil Shkurti – Roda JC – 2013–14
- Agim Zeka – Fortuna Sittard – 2018–20

== Algeria ==
- Amir Absalem – Groningen – 2017–20
- Paul Amara – DWS – 1960–61
- Mouhamed Belkheir – Fortuna Sittard – 2023–24
- Karim Bridji – FC Volendam, Heracles, RKC Waalwijk – 2003–04, 2006–09, 2011–12
- Oussama Darfalou – Vitesse, VVV-Venlo, PEC Zwolle, Emmen – 2018–23
- Rheda Djellal – Excelsior – 2011–12
- **Anis Hadj Moussa** – Vitesse, **Feyenoord** – 2023–
- Camiel Neghli – Sparta Rotterdam – 2023–25
- Youssef Sofiane – Roda JC – 2004–05
- Karim Soltani – VVV-Venlo, ADO Den Haag – 2007–10
- Ahmed Touba – RKC Waalwijk – 2020–22
- **Ramiz Zerrouki** – **Twente**, Feyenoord – 2020–

== Angola ==
- Guilherme Afonso – Twente – 2004–07
- Alexander Christovao – Groningen, SC Cambuur – 2012–14
- António Correia – Heerenveen – 2002–04
- Paolo da Costa Tavares – NAC – 1996–99
- Fredy – Excelsior – 2016–17
- Luwamo Garcia – VVV-Venlo – 2004–06
- Dominique Kivuvu – NEC – 2006–10
- Luis Pedro – Groningen – 2011–12
- André Vidigal – Fortuna Sittard – 2018–19

== Argentina ==
- Gastón Ávila – Ajax – 2023–24
- Hugo Bargas – De Graafschap – 2008–09, 2010–11
- Walter Benítez – PSV – 2022–25
- Mariano Bombarda – Groningen, Willem II, Feyenoord – 1994–2004
- Ezequiel Bullaude – Feyenoord, Fortuna Sittard – 2022–23, 2024–25
- Eduardo Bustos Montoya – Feyenoord – 1996–97
- Matías Cahais – Groningen – 2008–10
- Julián Carranza – Feyenoord – 2024–25
- **Maher Carrizo** – **Ajax** – 2025–
- **Gonzalo Crettaz** – **NEC** – 2025–
- Julio Cruz – Feyenoord – 1997–2000
- Darío Cvitanich – Ajax – 2008–11
- Osmar Ferreyra – PSV – 2005–06
- Nicolás Freire – PEC Zwolle – 2017–18
- Iván Gabrich – Ajax – 1996–97
- Patricio Graff – Feyenoord, Den Bosch – 1996–2000
- Mariano Juan – Ajax – 1996–2000
- Hernán Losada – Heerenveen – 2009–10
- Lisandro Magallán – Ajax – 2018–19, 2022–23
- Lisandro Martínez – Ajax – 2019–22
- Lucas Ocampos – Ajax – 2022–23
- Lucas Pratto – Feyenoord – 2020–21
- Maximiliano Romero – PSV – 2018–19, 2020–22
- Sergio Romero – AZ – 2007–11
- Mauro Rosales – Ajax – 2004–07
- José San Román – ADO Den Haag – 2016–17
- Gerónimo Rulli – Ajax – 2022–24
- Pablo Sánchez – Feyenoord – 1996–98
- Marcos Senesi – Feyenoord – 2019–22
- Nicolás Tagliafico – Ajax – 2017–22

== Armenia ==
- Gor Agbaljan – Heracles – 2016–17
- Norair Aslanyan – Groningen – 2009–11
- Aventis Aventisian – Go Ahead Eagles – 2021–23
- Edgar Manucharyan – Ajax – 2005–07
- Aras Özbiliz – Ajax, Willem II – 2010–12, 2018–19

== Aruba ==
- David Abdul – Sparta Rotterdam – 2008–10
- Gregor Breinburg – De Graafschap, NEC, Sparta Rotterdam – 2010–12, 2015–19
- Erixon Danso – Utrecht, FC Dordrecht – 2008–11, 2014–15
- Ronny Nouwen – Excelsior – 2002–03

== Australia ==
- Zlatko Arambasic – NAC – 1996–97
- Graham Arnold – Roda JC, NAC – 1990–92, 1995–97
- Daniel Arzani – Utrecht – 2020–21
- Eli Babalj – PEC Zwolle – 2014–15
- Joe Bacak – Vitesse – 1996–97
- Max Balard – NAC Breda – 2024–26
- Aziz Behich – PSV – 2018–19
- Mark Birighitti – NAC – 2017–19
- Milan Blagojevic – Heerenveen – 1993–94
- Jason van Blerk – Go Ahead Eagles – 1992–95
- **Jordan Bos** – **Feyenoord** – 2025–
- **Kasey Bos** – **Excelsior** – 2026–
- Eddy Bosnar – Heracles – 2006–08
- Raphael Bove – Heerenveen – 1997–99
- Rhys Bozinovski – Heracles Almelo – 2025–26
- David Carney – Twente – 2009–10
- Jason Culina – De Graafschap, Ajax, Twente, PSV – 2002–09
- Jason Davidson – Heracles, Groningen – 2011–14, 2016–17
- Daniel De Silva – Roda JC – 2015–17
- Kenneth Dougall – Sparta Rotterdam – 2016–18
- Brett Emerton – Feyenoord – 2000–03
- Denis Genreau – PEC Zwolle – 2018–19
- Craig Goodwin – Sparta Rotterdam – 2016–18
- Rostyn Griffiths – Roda JC – 2015–16
- Brett Holman – Excelsior, NEC, AZ – 2002–04, 2006–12
- Ajdin Hrustic – Groningen, Heracles Almelo – 2016–21, 2023–24, 2025–26
- Brad Jones – NEC, Feyenoord – 2015–18
- Tomi Juric – Roda JC – 2015–16
- Zeljko Kalac – Roda JC – 1998–2002
- Garang Kuol – Volendam – 2023–24
- Stephen Laybutt – RBC Roosendaal – 2000–01
- Stefan Mauk – NEC – 2016–17
- Ante Milicic – NAC – 1997–99
- David Mitchell – Feyenoord, NEC – 1987–89, 1990–91
- Tommy Oar – Utrecht – 2010–15
- Mike Petersen – Ajax – 1987–88
- **Cameron Peupion** – **ADO Den Haag** – 2026–
- Nikita Rukavytsya – Twente – 2009–10
- Mathew Ryan – AZ – 2022–24
- Trent Sainsbury – PEC Zwolle, PSV – 2013–15, 2018–19
- Adam Sarota – Utrecht – 2010–15
- Archie Thompson – PSV – 2005–06
- Aurelio Vidmar – Feyenoord – 1995–96
- Tony Vidmar – NAC – 1995–97, 2005–06
- Luke Wilkshire – Twente, Feyenoord – 2006–08, 2014–15
- Peter Zoïs – NAC, Willem II – 2000–01, 2003–07
- Michael Zullo – Utrecht – 2010–13

== Austria ==
- Gerard Aichorn – Den Bosch – 1983–88
- Marko Arnautović – Twente – 2006–09
- Raffael Behounek – Willem II – 2024–25
- **Nicolas Binder** – **Cambuur** – 2026–
- Richard Brousek – SC Enschede – 1958–60
- Martin Fraisl – ADO Den Haag – 2020
- Felix Gasselich – Ajax – 1983–85
- Fabian Gmeiner – NEC – 2016–17
- Adrian Grbić – Vitesse – 2021–22
- Leo Greiml – NAC Breda – 2024–26
- Florian Grillitsch – Ajax – 2022–23
- Darijo Grujcic – Fortuna Sittard – 2024–25
- Franz Hasil – Feyenoord – 1969–73
- Marc Janko – Twente – 2010–12
- Ferdinand Janotka – Holland Sport – 1969–70
- Jakob Jantscher – NEC – 2013–14
- Volkan Kahraman – Feyenoord – 1997–98
- Tobias Kainz – Heerenveen – 2010–11
- Roland Kollmann – Twente – 2001–02
- Wilhelm Kreuz – Sparta Rotterdam, Feyenoord – 1972–78
- Eduard Krieger – VVV-Venlo – 1978–79
- Marko Kvasina – Twente – 2017–18
- Rolf Landerl – AZ, Fortuna Sittard, Groningen – 1998–2004
- Andreas Lasnik – Willem II, NAC – 2010–13
- Michael Liendl – Twente – 2017–18
- Phillipp Mwene – PSV – 2021–23
- Franz Oberacher – AZ – 1982–83
- **Nikolas Polster** – **NEC** – 2026–
- Thomas Prager – Heerenveen – 2003–08
- Martin Pušić – Sparta Rotterdam – 2016–17
- **Luka Reischl** – **ADO Den Haag** – 2026–
- Marcel Ritzmaier – PSV, Cambuur, NEC, Go Ahead Eagles – 2012–18
- Samuel Şahin-Radlinger – Almere City – 2023–24
- Heinz Schilcher – Ajax – 1971–73
- Michael Schimpelsberger – Twente – 2010–11
- Wolfgang Schwarz – Sparta Rotterdam – 1979–80
- **Valentin Sulzbacher** – **Excelsior** – 2026–
- **Gernot Trauner** – **Feyenoord** – 2021–
- Andreas van der Veldt – HFC Haarlem – 1982–84
- **Paul Wanner** – **PSV** – 2025–
- Kurt Welzl – AZ – 1978–81
- Jonas Wendlinger – Almere City – 2024–25
- Maximilian Wöber – Ajax – 2017–19

== Azerbaijan ==
- Ozan Kökçü – Volendam – 2025–26

== Barbados ==
- Ryan Trotman – Twente – 2017–18

== Belarus ==
- Pavel Mikhalevich – NEC – 1994–2000
- Aleh Poetsila – NEC – 1995–98
- Andrei Zygmantovich – Groningen – 1991–92

== Belgium ==
=== A ===
- Naïm Aarab – NEC – 2007–08
- Stanley Aborah – Ajax, Vitesse – 2004–05, 2011–12
- Shawn Adewoye – RKC Waalwijk, Fortuna Sittard – 2020–26
- Kristof Aelbrecht – Vitesse – 1999–2000
- Tim Aelbrecht – RKC Waalwijk – 2003–04
- Toby Alderweireld – Ajax – 2008–14
- Jean-Pierre Andries – Helmond Sport – 1983–84
- Francesco Antonucci – Volendam – 2022–23
- Sebbe Augustijns – RKC Waalwijk – 2020–23
- Thomas Azevedo – Go Ahead Eagles – 2013–14
- Ismail Azzaoui – Willem II, Heracles Almelo – 2017–18, 2020–22

=== B ===
- Beni Badibanga – Roda JC – 2016–17
- Ziguy Badibanga – De Graafschap – 2011–12
- **Thibo Baeten** – **Go Ahead Eagles** – 2023–
- Johan Bakayoko – PSV – 2021–25
- Zakaria Bakkali – PSV, RKC Waalwijk – 2013–14, 2022–24
- **Jordy Bawuah** – PSV, **Twente** – 2025–
- Pascal Beeken – NAC – 1996–97
- Kevin Begois – Roda JC, VVV-Venlo, PEC Zwolle – 2005–06, 2007–11, 2013–14, 2015–16
- Manuel Benson – PEC Zwolle – 2020–21
- Davy De Beule – Roda JC – 2011–14
- Bart Biemans – Willem II, Roda JC – 2008–16
- Gilles De Bilde – PSV – 1996–99
- Roberto Blanquez – MVV – 1999–2000
- Xander Blomme – Go Ahead Eagles – 2022–24
- Siebe Blondelle – Vitesse, VVV-Venlo – 2005–08
- Ruud Boffin – VVV-Venlo – 2009–10
- Hakim Borahsasar – Breda – 2014–15
- **Rayane Bounida** – **Ajax** – 2024–
- Mohamed Bouchouari – Emmen – 2022–23
- Samy Bourard – ADO Den Haag – 2020–22
- Othman Boussaid – Utrecht – 2018–19, 2020–24
- Dedryck Boyata – Twente – 2012–13
- Jorn Brondeel – Twente, Willem II – 2017–18, 2019–22
- Loris Brogno – Sparta Rotterdam – 2016–18
- Thomas Buffel – Feyenoord – 1999–2000, 2002–05
- Dario Van den Buijs – Heracles, Fortuna Sittard, RKC Waalwijk – 2017–25
- Maxime Busi – NAC Breda – 2024–25
- Bart Buysse – Twente, NEC – 2010–12, 2015–16

=== C ===
- Jinty Caenepeel – Excelsior – 2017–19
- Thomas Caers – MVV – 1999–2000
- Tom Caluwé – Willem II, Utrecht – 1999–2009
- Giuseppe Canale – Roda JC – 1995–96
- Fabio Caracciolo – ADO Den Haag – 2008–09
- Bram Castro – Roda JC, Heracles – 2006–10, 2014–18
- Jurgen Cavens – Twente – 2002–03
- Benjamin De Ceulaer – Feyenoord, RKC Waalwijk – 2005–07, 2009–10
- Nacer Chadli – Twente – 2010–13
- Thomas Chatelle – NEC – 2010–11
- **Alessandro Ciranni** – Fortuna Sittard, **Willem II** – 2018–19, 2026–
- Ian Claes – Heerenveen – 2000–01
- Gert Claessens – Vitesse – 2001–03
- Geoffrey Claeys – Feyenoord – 1996–98
- Marc De Clerck – Twente, Go Ahead Eagles – 1974–76, 1979–80
- Antoine Colassin – Heerenveen – 2022–23
- Jerôme Colinet – Roda JC – 2003–06
- Pieter Collen – NEC, Feyenoord, NAC – 1999–2007
- Milan Corryn – Almere City – 2023–24
- **Nolhan Courtens** – **Heerenveen** – 2025–
- Jordy Croux – Willem II – 2016–19

=== D ===
- Björn Daelemans – RBC Roosendaal, Heracles – 2001–08
- Jos Daerden – Roda JC – 1984–86
- David Damman – Heerenveen – 1997–98
- Jelle Van Damme – Ajax – 2002–04
- Matteo Dams – PSV – 2024–25
- Lennerd Daneels – RKC Waalwijk – 2019–23
- Dimitri Davidovic – NEC – 1969–71
- Laurens De Bock – ADO Den Haag – 2019–20
- **Jari De Busser** – Go Ahead Eagles, **AZ** – 2024–
- Garry De Graef – RKC Waalwijk, De Graafschap – 1998–2003, 2004–05
- Brian De Keersmaecker – Heracles Almelo – 2023–25
- Mathias De Wolf – NEC – 2021–22
- Marc Degryse – PSV – 1996–98
- **Maxime Delanghe** – **Willem II** – 2026–
- Sven Delanoy – Willem II – 2003–06
- Laurent Delorge – ADO Den Haag, Ajax, Roda JC – 2006–13
- Gregory Delwarte – Roda JC – 1997–2000
- Mousa Dembélé – Willem II, AZ – 2005–10
- Timothy Derijck – Feyenoord, NAC, ADO Den Haag, PSV, Utrecht – 2005–07, 2008–16
- **Anthony Descotte** – Utrecht, Volendam, **Fortuna Sittard** – 2022–
- Kevin Van Dessel – NAC, Roda JC, VVV – 1997–98, 1999–2006, 2009–10
- Johan Devrindt – PSV – 1970–72
- Sieben Dewaele – Heerenveen – 2020–21
- Alexandre Di Gregorio – RKC Waalwijk – 2009–10
- Seydina Diarra – NEC – 2013–14
- **Matisse Didden** – **Utrecht** – 2024–
- Landry Dimata – NEC – 2022–23
- Rheda Djellal – Excelsior – 2011
- Célestin Djim – Roda JC – 2016–18
- Jacky Donkor – Fortuna Sittard, Excelsior – 2019–20, 2022–23
- Bart Van Den Eede – Den Bosch, Breda, Willem II, NEC – 2000–06

=== E ===
- Yassine El Ghanassy – Heerenveen – 2012–13
- Sofiène El Khadri – Fortuna Sittard – 2001–02
- **Alonzo Engwanda** – **Utrecht** – 2024–
- Vincent Euvrard – Den Bosch – 2004–05

=== F ===
- Wout Faes – Heerenveen, Excelsior – 2016–18
- Davy De Fauw – Sparta Rotterdam, Roda JC – 2001–02, 2005–11
- **Noah Fernandez** – **PSV** – 2025–
- Andréa Fileccia – Excelsior – 2010–12
- Predrag Filipović – Roda JC – 2002–05
- Guy François – PSV, VVV-Venlo, MVV – 1975–78, 1987–88

=== G ===
- Jordan Garcia-Calvete – De Graafschap – 2011–12
- **Moussa Gbemou** – **Fortuna Sittard** – 2025–
- Chris Van Geem – Fortuna Sittard – 2001–02
- Eric Gerets – MVV, PSV – 1984–92
- Mika Godts – Ajax – 2022–27
- Bart Goor – Feyenoord – 2004–05
- Christophe Grégoire – Willem II – 2008–10
- Daniel Guijo-Velasco – PSV, Excelsior – 2003–04, 2006–08
- Baptiste Guillaume – Almere City – 2024–25

=== H ===
- Stijn Haeldermans – MVV – 1995–96, Fortuna Sittard – 2000–02
- Robbie Haemhouts – NAC, Den Bosch, Willem II – 2001–05, 2012–13, 2014–16
- Geoffry Hairemans – De Graafschap – 2010–11
- Thorgan Hazard – PSV – 2022–23
- Jimmy Hempte – Roda JC – 2010–13
- Stephan Van Der Heyden – Roda JC – 1996–99
- Michaël Heylen – Emmen, Sparta Rotterdam – 2019–23
- Davy Heymans – MVV – 1999–2000
- Jonas Heymans – Willem II – 2014–15
- Alec Van Hoorenbeeck – Twente, Heracles Almelo – 2023–26
- **Siebe Horemans** – Excelsior, **Utrecht** – 2018–19, 2022–
- Kenny Van Hoevelen – RKC Waalwijk – 2013–14
- Peter Van Houdt – Roda JC – 1996–2000
- Stein Huysegems – AZ, Feyenoord, Twente, Roda JC – 2003–09, 2010–11
- Tom Van Hyfte – Roda JC – 2015–17

=== I ===
- Kristof Imschoot – Willem II – 2006–07
- Jonas Ivens – Groningen, RKC Waalwijk – 2010–14

=== J ===
- Jochen Janssen – RKC Waalwijk, Den Bosch – 2001–06
- Chris Janssens – Willem II – 2001–03

=== K ===
- Elton Kabangu – Willem II – 2019–20, 2021–22
- Nathan Kabasele – De Graafschap – 2015–16
- Hüseyin Karapinar – MVV – 1998–2000
- Andy Kawaya – Willem II – 2015–16
- Onur Kaya – Vitesse – 2005–10
- Jonas Van Kerckhoven – Willem II – 2012–13
- Wim Kiekens – Fortuna Sittard – 1998–2001
- Christophe Kinet – Sparta Rotterdam – 2004–06
- Sven Kums – Heerenveen – 2011–14

=== L ===
- Leroy Labylle – PEC Zwolle – 2013–14
- Vincent Lachambre – Roda JC – 2001–11
- Nayib Lagouireh – Excelsior – 2010–12
- Roland Lamah – Roda JC – 2007–08
- Sidney Lammens – RBC Roosendaal – 2003–06
- Boris Lambert – Willem II – 2024–25
- Ken Leemans – Roda JC, VVV-Venlo – 2006–11
- Erwin Lemmens – RKC Waalwijk – 2006–07
- **Mats Lemmens** – **Willem II** – 2026–
- Yves Lenaerts – PSV – 2002–03
- Philippe Léonard – Feyenoord – 2006–07
- Christophe Lepoint – Willem II – 2003–04
- Maxime Lestienne – PSV – 2015–16
- Gérard Lifondja – RKC Waalwijk – 2009–10
- Anthony Limbombe – NEC, Almere City – 2015–16, 2023–24
- Bryan Limbombe – Heracles Almelo – 2023–26
- Sébastien Locigno – Go Ahead Eagles – 2016–17
- Chris Lokesa – RKC Waalwijk – 2022–25
- Thierry Lutonda – RKC Waalwijk, PEC Zwolle – 2020–25

=== M ===
- Birger Maertens – Heracles – 2008–11
- **Mathieu Maertens** – **Cambuur** – 2026–
- Kris Mampaey – Willem II, Den Bosch – 1996–2000, 2001–05
- Mark De Man – Roda JC – 2008–09
- Jan-Pieter Martens – Roda JC – 1996–97
- Maarten Martens – RKC Waalwijk, AZ – 2004–14
- Nolan Martens – Excelsior – 2025–27
- Christophe Martin – Willem II – 2001–03
- Stefano Marzo – Heerenveen – 2013–17
- Hervé Matthys – Excelsior – 2018–19
- Rik Matthys – Willem II – 1957–59
- Emmanuel Matuta – Groningen – 2021–22
- Donovan Maury – Roda JC – 2002–03
- **Dylan Mbayo** – **PEC Zwolle** – 2024–
- Tim De Meersman – Vitesse – 2004–06
- Stijn Meert – MVV – 1999–2000
- Walter Meeuws – Ajax – 1984–85
- Dries Mertens – Utrecht, PSV – 2009–13
- Mohamed Messoudi – Willem II – 2006–09
- David Meul – Willem II – 2012–13, 2014–15
- Alain Van Mieghem – Roda JC – 2002–04
- Livio Milts – Roda JC – 2017–18
- Marc Minnaert – Breda – 1996–97
- Tom Van Mol – PSV, Sparta Rotterdam, PSV, Utrecht – 1991–2004
- Martijn Monteyne – Roda JC – 2011–16
- Tom De Mul – Ajax, Vitesse – 2003–07
- Charly Musonda – Vitesse – 2018–20
- Tom Muyters – Excelsior – 2015–17

=== N ===
- Chiró N'Toko – ADO Den Haag – 2010–12
- Maecky Ngombo – Roda JC – 2015–16, 2017–18
- Cyril Ngonge – RKC Waalwijk, Groningen – 2020–23
- Kevin Nicolay – De Graafschap – 2002–03
- Luc Nilis – PSV – 1994–2000
- Rob Nizet – Willem II – 2024–25
- Rob Nuyts – MVV – 1999–2001

=== O ===
- Willem Ofori-Appiah – Roda JC – 2015–16
- Funso Ojo – PSV, VVV-Venlo, Dordrecht, Willem II – 2008–12, 2014–17
- Loïs Openda – Vitesse – 2020–22
- Marco Ospitalieri – Fortuna Sittard – 2018–19
- Obbi Oulare – Willem II – 2016–17
- Davy Oyen – PSV – 1998–99
- **Luca Oyen** – **Heerenveen** – 2025–

=== P ===
- Kurt Van De Paar – Twente – 1998–2003
- Benjamin Pauwels – Volendam – 2025–26
- **Marvin Peersman** – Dordrecht, Cambuur, Groningen, **Telstar** – 2014–16, 2024–
- Tristan Peersman – Willem II – 2005–07
- Bob Peeters – Roda JC, Vitesse – 1997–2003
- Frédéric Peiremans – Twente – 1999–2000
- André Piters – Fortuna '54 – 1963–67
- Leon Plucieniczak – MVV – 1962–64
- Sébastien Pocognoli – AZ – 2007–10
- Jens Podevijn – Willem II – 2012–13

=== R ===
- Jordan Remacle – RKC Waalwijk – 2006–07
- Michel Ribeiro – Den Bosch – 1999–2000
- Steve De Ridder – De Graafschap, Utrecht – 2008–11, 2013–14
- Dante Rigo – PSV Eindhoven, Sparta Rotterdam, ADO Den Haag – 2017–21
- Milan Robberechts – Fortuna Sittard – 2023–25
- Philippe Rommens – Go Ahead Eagles – 2021–24
- Patrick Rondags – MVV – 1999–2000
- Bart De Roover – NAC Breda – 1997–98
- Sepp De Roover – Sparta Rotterdam, Groningen, NAC – 2006–10, 2012–14
- Giuseppe Rossini – Utrecht – 2005–08

=== S ===
- Cisse Sandra – Excelsior, Willem II – 2023–25
- Ryan Sanusi – Willem II, Sparta Rotterdam – 2012–13, 2016–18
- Mathias Schamp – Heracles Almelo – 2012–13
- Guido Schoefs – MVV – 1968
- Davy Schollen – Breda – 2004–06
- Lucas Schoofs – Breda, Heracles Almelo – 2017–18, 2019–22
- Maarten Schops – Roda JC, RKC Waalwijk, RBC Roosendaal, FC Zwolle – 1996–2003
- Björn Sengier – Willem II – 2006–08
- Dylan Seys – Twente, RKC Waalwijk – 2016–17, 2019–20
- Sekou Sidibe – Emmen – 2020–21
- Elias Sierra – Heracles – 2020–22
- Timmy Simons – PSV – 2005–10
- Tim Smolders – RBC Roosendaal – 2004–06
- Tom Soetaers – Roda JC, Ajax – 1999–2004
- Hans Somers – Utrecht – 2004–10
- Wesley Sonck – Ajax – 2003–05
- Sébastien Stassin – RBC Roosendaal – 2000–01
- Kenny Steppe – Heerenveen – 2008–09, 2010–12
- **Mathis Suray** – **Go Ahead Eagles** – 2024–
- Gill Swerts – Excelsior, Feyenoord, ADO Den Haag, Vitesse, AZ, NAC – 2002–12, 2013–14
- Youssuf Sylla – Willem II – 2024–25

=== T ===
- Ilias Takidine – RKC Waalwijk – 2023–24
- Stefaan Tanghe – Utrecht, Heracles Almelo – 2000–07
- Karim Tarfi – De Graafschap – 2015–16
- Karel Theuwis – PSV, USV Elinkwijk – 1956–61
- Mickaël Tirpan – Fortuna Sittard, Willem II – 2021–23, 2024–25
- Dieter Van Tornhout – Sparta Rotterdam, Roda JC – 2005–10
- Mike Trésor – Willem II – 2019–22
- David Triantafillidis – RKC Waalwijk – 2005–06
- Katuku Tshimanga – Willem II – 2016–17

=== U ===
- Adnan Ugur – Fortuna Sittard – 2019–20

=== V ===
- Kyan Vaesen – Willem II – 2024–25
- Joos Valgaeren – Roda JC – 1997–2000
- Günther Vanaudenaerde – NEC – 2006–07
- Jorn Vancamp – Roda JC – 2017–18
- Jamaïque Vandamme – Roda JC – 2006–10
- Kevin Vandenbergh – Utrecht – 2007–10
- Sven Vandenbroeck – Roda JC, De Graafschap – 2000–05
- Brian Vandenbussche – Sparta Rotterdam, Heerenveen – 2001–02, 2004–14
- Birger Van De Ven – RBC Roosendaal – 2004–05
- Jan Van den Bergh – NAC Breda – 2024–25
- Zinho Vanheusden – AZ – 2022–23
- **Charles Vanhoutte** – **Feyenoord** – 2026–
- Jannes Vansteenkiste – Roda JC – 2017–18
- Guy Veldeman – Willem II – 1999–2003
- Bryan Verboom – Roda JC – 2016–17
- Davino Verhulst – Willem II – 2010–11
- Nicolas Verkooijen – PSV – 2025–26
- Jan Verlinden – Twente – 1999–2003
- Thibaud Verlinden – Fortuna Sittard – 2021
- Thomas Vermaelen – Ajax, RKC Waalwijk – 2003–09
- Marnick Vermijl – NEC – 2013–14
- Matthias Verreth – PSV – 2018–19
- Arno Verschueren – NAC, Sparta Rotterdam, Twente – 2017–19, 2022–26
- Yorbe Vertessen – PSV – 2020–24
- Jan Vertonghen – Ajax, RKC Waalwijk – 2006–11
- Patrick Vervoort – RKC Waalwijk – 1995–96
- Björn Vleminckx – NEC – 2009–11
- Jordy Vleugels – Willem II – 2014–15
- Geert De Vlieger – Willem II – 1999–2004
- Siemen Voet – PEC Zwolle, Fortuna Sittard – 2021–22, 2023–24
- Mark Volders – RBC Roosendaal – 2005–06
- Stijn Vreven – Utrecht, Vitesse, ADO Den Haag – 1999–2003, 2004–07

=== W ===
- **Matteo Waem** – **ADO Den Haag** – 2026–
- Jonathan Wilmet – Willem II – 2005–08
- Yves De Winter – De Graafschap – 2011–12
- Chris De Witte – Twente, Groningen – 1997–2005
- Kris De Wree – Roda JC – 2008–10
- Dries Wuytens – Willem II, Heracles Almelo – 2014–18
- Jan Wuytens – Heracles Almelo, Utrecht, AZ – 2005–16
- Stijn Wuytens – PSV, De Graafschap, Willem II, AZ – 2008–12, 2014–20
- **Siebe Wylin** – **Fortuna Sittard** – 2026–
- Jeanvion Yulu-Matondo – Roda JC – 2007–11

== Bermuda ==
- Clyde Best – Feyenoord – 1977–78

== Bonaire ==
- Quincy Hoeve – Volendam – 2023–24

== Bosnia and Herzegovina ==
- Anel Ahmedhodžić – Feyenoord – 2025–26
- **Esmir Bajraktarević** – **PSV** – 2024–
- Dario Đumić – NEC, Utrecht, Twente – 2015–18, 2020–22
- Ognjen Gnjatić – Roda JC – 2016–18
- Nebojša Gudelj – Breda, Sparta Rotterdam – 1997–2006
- Amar Ćatić – ADO Den Haag – 2020–22
- Said Hamulić – Vitesse – 2023–24
- Luka Kulenović – Heracles Almelo – 2024–26
- Boban Lazić – PEC Zwolle – 2015–16
- Marko Maletić – Excelsior – 2014–15
- Haris Medunjanin – AZ, Sparta Rotterdam – 2004–08
- Samir Memišević – Groningen – 2016–20
- Adi Nalić – Almere City – 2023–25
- Boris Rasević – PEC Zwolle – 2013–16
- Esad Razić – Den Bosch, RBC Roosendaal – 2001–04
- Adnan Sečerović – Roda JC – 2009–10
- Miroslav Stefanović – FC Volendam – 1993–96
- Tino-Sven Sušić – VVV-Venlo – 2018–19
- Benjamin Tahirović – Ajax – 2023–25

== Brazil ==
- Alcides – PSV – 2007–08
- Alex – PSV – 2004–07
- Afonso Alves – Heerenveen – 2006–08
- Bruno Andrade – Willem II – 2013–16
- Arghus – Excelsior – 2016–17
- André Bahia – Feyenoord – 2004–11
- Antony – Ajax – 2020–23
- Michel Bastos – Feyenoord, Excelsior – 2001–03
- Pedro Beda – Heerenveen – 2008–09
- Eric Botteghin – NAC, Groningen, Feyenoord – 2011–21
- **Caio Henrique** – **Ajax** – 2026–
- Canigia – AZ – 1998–2000, 2002–04
- Carlos – Telstar – 1965–66
- Carlos Vinícius – PSV Eindhoven – 2021–23
- Cássio – PSV, Sparta Rotterdam – 2008–09, 2010–11
- Claudemir – Vitesse – 2007–10
- Cláudio – PSV, Fortuna Sittard – 1996–98, 2000–02
- Cristiano – Breda, Roda JC, Willem II – 1998–2008
- Alair Cruz Vicente – AZ – 2000–02, 2003–04
- Danilo – Ajax, Twente, Feyenoord, NEC – 2019–23, 2025–26
- Darley – Feyenoord – 2009–10
- Émerson – MVV – 1998–99
- Everton – Heracles – 2006–13
- Fagner – PSV – 2007–08
- Zezé Gambassi – Fortuna '54 – 1965–66
- Gláucio – Feyenoord – 1994–95, 1997–98
- Heurelho Gomes – PSV – 2004–08
- **Rodrigo Guth** – NEC, **Fortuna Sittard** – 2021–25, 2026–
- Gustavo Hebling – PEC Zwolle – 2015–17
- Hugo – Groningen – 1997–2005
- Jean Carlos – Feyenoord – 2003–04
- Jonathas – AZ – 2009–11
- Jorginho – PSV – 1998–99
- **Mauro Júnior** – **PSV**, Heracles – 2017–
- Kayky – Sparta Rotterdam – 2024–25
- Leandro – PSV – 2002–05
- Leonardo – Groningen, Feyenoord, De Graafschap, ADO Den Haag – 1997–2004
- Leonardo – Feyenoord, NAC, Ajax – 2000–11
- Luciano – Groningen – 2008–13
- Luis Felipe – PSV – 2020
- Magno – Groningen, De Graafschap – 1996–99, 2004–05
- Gérson Magrão – Feyenoord – 2004–05
- Marcelo – PSV – 2010–13
- Marcelo – PSV – 1997–98
- Marcos – PSV – 1998–99
- **Marcos Leonardo** – **Ajax** – 2026–
- Marilia – Sparta Rotterdam – 1996–2002
- Marquinho – PSV – 2000–02
- Matheus – Ajax – 2024–25
- Maxwell – Ajax – 2001–06
- Metinho – Sparta Rotterdam – 2023–25
- Nathan – Vitesse – 2015–17
- David Neres – Ajax – 2016–22
- Sérgio Oliveira – NAC, Roda JC – 2000–06
- Igor Paixão – Feyenoord – 2022–25
- **Weslley Patati** – **AZ** – 2025–
- Paulo Henrique – Heerenveen – 2007–10
- Lucas Piazon – Vitesse – 2013–14
- Rafael – Heerenveen – 2000–02
- André Ramalho – PSV – 2021–24
- Jonathan Reis – PSV, Vitesse – 2008–14
- Robert – PSV – 2004–06
- Romário – PSV – 1988–93
- Ronaldo – PSV – 1994–96
- **Lucas Rosa** – **Ajax** – 2024–
- Márcio Santos – Ajax – 1995–97
- Sávio – PSV – 2022–23
- Somália – Feyenoord – 1999–2000
- Diego Tardelli – PSV – 2006–07
- Tininho – Feyenoord, RBC Roosendaal, NEC, ADO Den Haag – 1998–2001, 2002–07
- Bruno Uvini – Twente – 2015–16
- Vampeta – PSV – 1994–98
- Léo Veloso – Willem II – 2008–10
- Wallace – Vitesse – 2014–15
- Wamberto – Ajax – 1998–2004
- Wellington – Twente – 2009–10
- Wilson – Telstar – 1965–66
- Renan Zanelli – Willem II – 2014–15
- Zefilho – Breda – 1998–99

== Bulgaria ==
- Plamen Andreev – Feyenoord – 2024–25
- Filip Krastev – Cambuur, PEC Zwolle – 2021–22, 2023–25
- Stanislav Manolev – PSV – 2009–13
- Nikolay Mihaylov – Twente – 2008–09, 2010–13
- **Hristiyan Petrov** – **Heerenveen** – 2024–
- Simeon Raykov – Roda JC – 2016–17
- Stanislav Shopov – Heerenveen – 2021–22
- Igor Tomašić – Roda JC, MVV – 1997–2002
- Ivan Tsvetkov – Heerenveen – 1998–2000, 2002–04, 2005–07
- Stefan Velkov – RKC Waalwijk – 2019–20
- Andrey Zhelyazkov – Feyenoord – 1981–84

== Burkina Faso ==
- Adamo Nagalo – PSV – 2024–25
- **Kilian Nikiema** – **ADO Den Haag** – 2026–
- Rahim Ouédraogo – Twente, Heracles – 1998–2008
- Ousmane Sanou – Willem II, Sparta Rotterdam – 1996–2003
- Bertrand Traoré – Vitesse, Ajax – 2013–15, 2016–17, 2024–26
- Lassina Traoré – Ajax – 2018–21
- **Arthur Zagre** – **Utrecht**, Excelsior – 2021–24, 2025–
- Mamadou Zongo – Vitesse, De Graafschap – 1997–2006

== Burundi ==
- Mohamed Amissi – Heracles – 2020–22
- Saidi Ntibazonkiza – NEC – 2006–10
- Kassim Bizimana – Groningen – 2005–06

== Cameroon ==
- Timothée Atouba – Ajax – 2009–10
- Cedric Badjeck – Utrecht, Excelsior – 2011–16
- Franck-Yves Bambock – Sparta Rotterdam – 2017–18
- Arnaud Djoum – Roda JC – 2008–14
- Eyong Enoh – Ajax – 2008–13
- Émile Mbamba – Vitesse – 2000–04
- Tsiy-William Ndenge – Roda JC – 2017–18
- André Onana – Ajax – 2016–22
- Willie Overtoom – Heracles, AZ – 2008–14
- Kallé Soné – Vitesse – 2002–04
- Bernard Tchoutang – Roda JC – 1998–2002

== Canada ==
- **Charles-Andreas Brym** – Sparta Rotterdam, Almere City, **NAC** – 2022–
- Tiago Codinha – Volendam – 2025–26
- Rob Friend – Heerenveen, Heracles – 2006–07
- Atiba Hutchinson – PSV – 2010–13
- Will Johnson – Heerenveen, De Graafschap – 2006–08
- Marcel de Jong – Roda JC – 2006–10
- Cyle Larin – Feyenoord – 2025–26
- Andrew Ornoch – Heracles – 2009–10
- Randy Samuel – PSV, FC Volendam, Fortuna Sittard – 1986–93
- Frank Sturing – NEC – 2016–17
- Josh Wagenaar – ADO Den Haag – 2006–07

== Cape Verde ==
- Jerson Cabral – Feyenoord, Twente, ADO Den Haag, Willem II, Sparta Rotterdam – 2010–17
- Kristopher Da Graca – VVV-Venlo – 2021-22
- Alessio Da Cruz – Twente, Groningen, Fortuna Sittard – 2015–16, 2020–21, 2023–25
- Deroy Duarte – Sparta Rotterdam, Fortuna Sittard – 2017–18, 2019–24
- Laros Duarte – Groningen – 2021–23, 2024–25
- Jeffry Fortes – FC Dordrecht, Excelsior, Sparta Rotterdam – 2014–15, 2016–19, 2020–21
- Josimar Lima – Willem II, FC Dordrecht, VVV-Venlo – 2009–11, 2014–15, 2018–19
- Cecilio Lopes – Excelsior, Sparta Rotterdam, FC Volendam – 2002–03, 2006–07, 2008–09
- Billy Maximiano – Groningen, Den Bosch – 2000–02
- **Jamiro Monteiro** – SC Cambuur, Heracles, PEC Zwolle, **NEC** – 2015–16, 2017–18, 2024–
- Rui Monteiro – Sparta Rotterdam – 2000–02
- Guy Ramos – RKC Waalwijk, Roda JC – 2011–14
- Jerson Ribeiro – Excelsior – 2010–11
- Zé Rodrigues – Sparta Rotterdam – 1991–93
- **Ayoni Santos** – Sparta Rotterdam, **PSV** – 2025–
- Lisandro Semedo – Fortuna Sittard – 2018–19, 2020–22
- **Ilano Silva Timas** – **Excelsior** – 2026–
- Bruno Varela – Ajax – 2019–20
- Toni Varela – RKC Waalwijk, Excelsior – 2009–10, 2014–15

== Chile ==
- Jorge Acuña – Feyenoord, RBC Roosendaal – 2002–04, 2005–06
- Mauricio Aros – Feyenoord – 2001–02
- Cristián Cuevas – Twente – 2017–18
- Felipe Gutiérrez – Twente – 2012–15
- Juan Gonzalo Lorca – Vitesse – 2007–08
- Stefano Magnasco – Groningen – 2012–14
- Sebastián Pardo – Feyenoord, Excelsior – 2002–08

== China ==
- Sun Xiang – PSV – 2006–07
- Yu Hai – Vitesse – 2006–08
- Zhang Yuning – Vitesse, ADO Den Haag – 2015–17, 2018–19

== Colombia ==
- Santiago Arias – PSV – 2013–18
- Mateo Cassierra – Ajax, Groningen – 2016–19
- Daniel Cruz – Ajax – 2000–01
- Luis Manuel Orejuela – Ajax – 2017–19
- Davinson Sánchez – Ajax – 2016–17
- Luis Sinisterra – Feyenoord – 2018–22

== Comoros ==
- **Saïd Bakari** – RKC Waalwijk, **Sparta Rotterdam** – 2019–
- Yacine Bourhane – Go Ahead Eagles – 2021–22
- Faiz Mattoir – Almere City – 2023–25
- Rémy Vita – Fortuna Sittard – 2022–24

== Costa Rica ==
- Esteban Alvarado – AZ – 2010–15
- Jeyland Mitchell – Feyenoord – 2024–25
- Bryan Ruiz – Twente, PSV – 2009–12, 2013–14
- Manfred Ugalde – Twente – 2021–24

== Croatia ==
- Andrija Balić – Fortuna Sittard – 2018–19
- Kristijan Bistrović – Fortuna Sittard – 2022–23
- Darko Bodul – Ajax, Sparta Rotterdam – 2008–10
- Frane Bućan – MVV – 1991–92
- Darko Butorović – Vitesse – 1998–99
- Ante Ćorić – VVV-Venlo – 2020–21
- Joey Didulica – Ajax, AZ – 2001–03, 2006–07, 2008–11
- Ante Erceg – Fortuna Sittard – 2024–25
- Tomislav Gomelt – ADO Den Haag – 2020–21
- Alen Halilović – Heerenveen, Fortuna Sittard – 2019–20, 2023–26
- Tibor Halilović – Heerenveen – 2021–23
- Luka Ivanušec – Feyenoord – 2023–25
- **Tino Jukić** – **Go Ahead Eagles** – 2026–
- Marko Kolar – Emmen – 2019–21
- Srđan Lakić – Heracles Almelo – 2007–08
- Mateo Leš – Heracles Almelo – 2020–22
- Andrej Lukić – Emmen – 2018–19
- **Jakov Medić** – Ajax, **Utrecht** – 2023–24, 2026–
- Ante Miše – Vitesse – 1994–97
- Josip Mitrović – Fortuna Sittard – 2024–25
- Robert Murić – Ajax – 2015–16
- **Darko Nejašmić** – **NEC** – 2025–
- Dominik Oroz – Vitesse – 2020–24
- Ivor Pandur – Fortuna Sittard – 2022–24
- Stipe Perica – NAC – 2013–15
- **Ivan Perišić** – **PSV** – 2024–
- **Marko Pjaca** – **Twente** – 2025–
- Danijel Pranjić – Heerenveen – 2005–09
- Stipe Radić – Fortuna Sittard – 2022–23
- Leon Sopić – Emmen – 2019–20
- Borna Sosa – Ajax – 2023–24
- **Josip Sutalo** – **Ajax** – 2023–
- Marin Šverko – Groningen – 2021–23
- **Luka Tunjić** – **Fortuna Sittard** – 2024–
- Gabriel Vidović – Vitesse – 2022–23
- Dario Vujičević – Twente, VVV-Venlo, Heracles – 2008–11, 2012–17

== Curaçao ==
- Kemy Agustien – Willem II, Roda JC, AZ, RKC Waalwijk – 2004–08, 2009–10
- **Isaiah Ahmed** – Heerenveen, **Telstar** – 2024–
- Vurnon Anita – Ajax, Willem II, RKC Waalwijk – 2005–07, 2008–13, 2018–19, 2020–23
- Jarchinio Antonia – ADO Den Haag, Go Ahead Eagles, Groningen – 2010–11, 2013–17
- Suently Alberto – PSV – 2014–15
- Jeremy Antonisse – PSV, Emmen – 2020–21, 2022–23
- Shutlan Axwijk – Groningen – 2003–04
- Juninho Bacuna – Groningen, Volendam – 2014–18, 2025–26
- Leandro Bacuna – Groningen – 2009–13, 2024–25
- Charlison Benschop – Fortuna Sittard – 2021–22
- Christy Bonevacia – AZ – 2003–04
- Lentini Caciano – Emmen – 2020–21
- Jayden Candelaria – NAC – 2025–26
- Jurich Carolina – Breda – 2018–19
- Kenneth Cicilia – Sparta Rotterdam – 2001–02
- Rigino Cicilia – Roda JC – 2015–16
- Angelo Cijntje – Groningen – 2013–14
- **Shuryjano Cornecion** – **PSV** – 2026–
- Kevin Felida – RKC Waalwijk – 2022–25
- Carlito Fermina – Excelsior – 2018–19
- Guyon Fernandez – Excelsior, Feyenoord, PEC Zwolle, Breda – 2010–15
- **Sherel Floranus** – Sparta Rotterdam, Heerenveen, Almere City, **PEC Zwolle** – 2016–21, 2023–
- **Deveron Fonville** – **NEC** – 2025–
- Juriën Gaari – RKC Waalwijk – 2019–24
- Sontje Hansen – Ajax, NEC – 2019–20, 2023–25
- Nazjir Held – Utrecht – 2023–24
- Elson Hooi – NAC, ADO Den Haag – 2012–15, 2017–20
- Raily Ignacio – ADO Den Haag – 2009–11
- Anton Jongsma – Groningen, RKC Waalwijk – 2001–03, 2009–10
- Gervane Kastaneer – ADO Den Haag, NAC Breda, PEC Zwolle – 2005–07, 2008–13, 2021–22
- Brandley Kuwas – Excelsior, Heracles Almelo, Volendam – 2015–19, 2025–26
- Darryl Lachman – Groningen, PEC Zwolle, Twente, SC Cambuur, Willem II, PEC Zwolle – 2009–11, 2012–20
- Michaël Maria – Twente – 2017–18
- Nathan Markelo – Twente, Excelsior, Fortuna Sittard – 2020–21, 2022–24
- **Ar'jany Martha** – Ajax, **Telstar** – 2023–24, 2026–
- Cuco Martina – RKC Waalwijk, Twente, Feyenoord, Go Ahead Eagles – 2011–15, 2018–19, 2021–22
- Javier Martina – Ajax – 2008–09
- Quenten Martinus – Heerenveen – 2010–12
- Shelton Martis – Excelsior – 2002–03
- **Tyrique Mercera** – **Groningen** – 2025–
- Vidarrell Papito Merencia – ADO Den Haag – 2013–15
- Rihairo Meulens – Vitesse, Roda JC, Dordrecht – 2006–07, 2009–11, 2014–15
- Dustley Mulder – RKC Waalwijk – 2005–10
- Tyrese Noslin – Telstar – 2025–26
- **Armando Obispo** – **PSV Eindhoven**, Vitesse – 2017–18, 2019–
- Justin Ogenia – Willem II – 2019–20
- Prince Rajcomar – Utrecht – 2004–05
- Godfried Roemeratoe – Twente, Willem II, RKC Waalwijk – 2019–22, 2023–25
- Eloy Room – Vitesse, Go Ahead Eagles, PSV Eindhoven – 2008–18, 2023–24
- Rayvien Rosario – Sparta Rotterdam – 2022–24
- Giandro Sambo – Heracles Almelo – 2024–25
- Xander Severina – ADO Den Haag – 2020–21
- Orlando Smeekes – FC Volendam – 2003–04
- **Nicky Souren** – **Cambuur** – 2026–
- **Nigel Thomas** – **ADO Den Haag** – 2026–
- Giovanni Troupée – Utrecht, ADO Den Haag, Twente – 2014–22
- Cherrion Valerius – NAC Breda – 2024–26
- Roshon van Eijma – RKC Waalwijk – 2024–25
- Charlton Vicento – ADO Den Haag, Willem II – 2009–13, 2014–15
- Richairo Živković – Groningen, Ajax, Willem II, Utrecht, Emmen – 2012–17, 2022–23
- Felitciano Zschusschen – Twente, Breda – 2012–15

== Cyprus ==
- Costas Costa – Utrecht – 1998–99
- Marcus Edwards – Excelsior – 2018–19
- Loizos Loizou – Heerenveen – 2023–24
- Nestoras Mitidis – Roda JC – 2016–17
- **Nikolas Panagiotou** – **Utrecht** – 2026–

== Czech Republic ==
- Lukáš Bajer – Heracles – 2008–09
- Václav Černý – Ajax, Utrecht, Twente – 2015–18, 2019–23
- Matěj Chaluš – Groningen – 2022–23
- Marián Chlad – Groningen – 1993–94
- Jozef Chovanec – PSV – 1988–91
- Pavel Čmovš – NEC – 2011–14
- Jaroslav Drobný – ADO Den Haag – 2005–06
- **Yannick Eduardo** – **ADO Den Haag** – 2026–
- Tomáš Galásek – Willem II, Ajax – 1996–2006
- Denis Granečný – Emmen – 2020–21
- Zdeněk Grygera – Ajax – 2003–07
- Tomáš Hájek – Vitesse – 2020–23
- Dominik Janošek – NAC – 2024–25
- Vítězslav Jaroš – Ajax – 2025–26
- Josef Jelínek – Go Ahead Eagles – 1970–72
- Tomáš Kalas – Vitesse – 2011–13
- Milan Kopic – Heerenveen – 2008–10
- **Matěj Kovář** – **PSV** – 2025–
- Josef Kvída – PEC Zwolle – 2016–17
- Martin Lejsal – Heerenveen – 2009–10
- Jacob Lensky – Feyenoord, Utrecht – 2006–07, 2009–12
- Ondrej Lingr – Feyenoord – 2023–24
- Lukáš Mareček – Heerenveen – 2012–13
- Dominik Mašek – SC Cambuur – 2015–16
- Ondřej Mihálik – AZ – 2017–18
- Jaroslav Navrátil – Heracles – 2012–18
- Tomáš Necid – PEC Zwolle, ADO Den Haag – 2014–15, 2018–20
- Michal Nehoda – De Graafschap – 1999–2000
- Jaromír Paciorek – Fortuna Sittard – 1998–2001
- Michal Papadopulos – Heerenveen – 2009–11
- Paul Quasten – Willem II, RKC Waalwijk – 2008–09, 2019–21
- Michal Sadílek – PSV, Twente – 2018–25
- Vojtěch Schulmeister – Heracles – 2008–10
- Jan Šeda – RKC Waalwijk – 2013–14
- Václav Sejk – Heerenveen – 2025–26
- Jarda Simr – NEC, Excelsior – 2001–05, 2006–08
- **Matěj Šín** – AZ, **ADO Den Haag** – 2025–
- David Střihavka – Willem II – 2011–12
- Michal Svec – Heerenveen – 2008–2011
- Ondřej Švejdík – Groningen – 2006–10
- Vít Valenta – FC Volendam – 2008–09
- **Jan Žambůrek** – Heracles Almelo, **ADO Den Haag** – 2024–

== Democratic Republic of the Congo ==
- Samuel Bastien – Fortuna Sittard – 2024–25
- Jeremy Bokila – Willem II – 2024–25
- Jordan Botaka – Excelsior, Fortuna Sittard – 2014–16, 2021–22
- **Nolhan Courtens** – **Heerenveen** – 2025–
- Junior Kadile – Almere City – 2024–25
- Pedro Kamata – Groningen – 2002–03
- Hervé Kage – RKC Waalwijk – 2006–07
- Jody Lukoki – Ajax, Cambuur, PEC Zwolle – 2010–15
- Gaël Kakuta – Vitesse – 2012–14
- Yann Kitala – Almere City – 2023–24
- Jason Lokilo – Sparta Rotterdam – 2022–23
- Mike Mampuya – VVV-Venlo – 2007–09
- **Jorthy Mokio** – **Ajax** – 2024–
- Samuel Moutoussamy – Fortuna Sittard – 2020–21
- Jean-Claude Mukanya – Breda – 1996–97
- Jonathan Okita – NEC – 2021–22
- Abel Tamata – PSV, Roda JC, Groningen – 2010–17
- Zico Tumba – De Graafschap, NEC – 1998–04

== Denmark ==
- Hans Aabech – Twente, De Graafschap – 1975–77
- **Aske Adelgaard** – Go Ahead Eagles, **Twente** – 2024–
- Joachim Andersen – Twente – 2014–18
- Lucas Andersen – Ajax, Willem II – 2012–16
- Silas Andersen – Utrecht – 2023–25
- Stephan Andersen – Go Ahead Eagles – 2013–14
- Frank Arnesen – Ajax, PSV – 1975–81, 1985–88
- Nikolai Baden Frederiksen – Fortuna Sittard, Vitesse – 2019–20, 2021–23
- Thomas Bælum – Willem II – 2006–08
- Allan Bak Jensen – Heerenveen – 2001–02
- Kristian Bak Nielsen – Heerenveen – 2007–10
- Patrick Banggaard – Roda JC – 2017–18
- Mads Bech Sørensen – Groningen – 2022–23
- Emil Berggreen – Twente – 2019–20
- Mika Biereth – RKC Waalwijk – 2022–23
- Michael Birkedal – Twente – 1981–86
- **Clement Bischoff** – **NEC** – 2026–
- Andreas Bjelland – Twente – 2012–15
- Kresten Bjerre – PSV, Go Ahead Eagles – 1968–70, 1977–78
- Kasper Bøgelund – PSV – 1999–2005
- Nicolai Boilesen – Ajax – 2010–16
- David Boysen – Roda JC – 2016–17
- Jakob Breum – Go Ahead Eagles – 2023–26
- **Mikkel Bro Hansen** – **PSV** – 2026–
- Nicolai Brock-Madsen – PEC Zwolle – 2016–17
- Lars Brøgger – Dordrecht '90 – 1994–95
- Kenneth Brylle – PSV – 1984–85
- Søren Busk – MVV – 1979–82, 1985–86
- Oskar Buur – Volendam – 2022–24
- **Valdemar Byskov** – **AZ** – 2026–
- Kim Christensen – Twente – 2003–05
- Martin Christensen – Heracles – 2008
- Tommy Christensen – PSV – 1979–81
- Kevin Conboy – NEC, Utrecht – 2011–14, 2015–17
- Denni Conteh – Sparta Rotterdam – 2002–03
- Thomas Dalgaard – Heerenveen – 2014–15
- Mohamed Daramy – Ajax – 2021–22
- **Kasper Dolberg** – **Ajax** – 2016–20, 2025–
- Anders Dreyer – Heerenveen – 2019–20
- Anders Due – Vitesse – 2006–08
- Mikkel Duelund – NEC – 2021–23
- Riza Durmisi – Sparta Rotterdam – 2021–22
- Erik Dyreborg – Holland Sport – 1968–69
- Henrik Eigenbrod – AZ – 1982–84
- Lars Elstrup – Feyenoord – 1986–88
- Thomas Enevoldsen – Groningen – 2009–12
- Christian Eriksen – Ajax – 2009–14
- John Eriksen – Roda JC, Feyenoord – 1979–84, 1985–86
- Oliver Feldballe – Cambuur – 2013–14
- Viktor Fischer – Ajax – 2012–16
- John Frandsen – NEC, PEC Zwolle – 1973–74, 1978–81
- Oscar Fraulo – Utrecht – 2023–25
- Jan Frederiksen – Excelsior – 2002
- Ole Fritsen – GVAV – 1965–70
- **Anton Gaaei** – **Ajax** – 2023–
- Benny Gall – Dordrecht '90 – 1994–95
- Mathias Gehrt – ADO Den Haag – 2013–2016
- **Simon Graves** – **PEC Zwolle** – 2024–
- Jakob Gregersen – Groningen – 1995–96
- Jesper Grønkjær – Ajax – 1998–2000
- Jesper Håkansson – Heerenveen, RBC Roosendaal, ADO Den Haag – 1999–2005, 2006–07
- Johnny Hansen – Ajax – 1991–93
- Martin Hansen – ADO Den Haag – 2014–2016
- Michael Hansen – Breda – 1999–2000
- Dennis Heine – Den Bosch – 1992–93
- Jan Heintze – PSV – 1982–94, 1999–2003
- Jørgen Henriksen – Utrecht – 1970–76
- Daniel Høegh – Heerenveen – 2017–20
- Niels-Christian Holmstrøm – ADO Den Haag – 1969–70
- Frederik Holst – Sparta Rotterdam – 2017–18
- Ken Ilsø – Heerenveen – 2005–06
- Johnny Jacobsen – Feyenoord, Willem II – 1980–83
- Michael Jakobsen – PSV – 2003–04
- Birger Jensen – RKC Waalwijk – 1988–89
- Bjarne Jensen – GVAV, Groningen – 1969–75
- Brian Jensen – AZ – 1998–99
- Daniel Jensen – Heerenveen – 1998–2003
- David Jensen – Utrecht – 2016–19
- Henning Jensen – Ajax – 1979–81
- **Isak Jensen** – **AZ** – 2025–
- Niclas Jensen – PSV – 1996–98
- **Victor Jensen** – Ajax, **Utrecht** – 2020–
- **Jonas Jensen-Abbew** – **ADO Den Haag** – 2026–
- Allan K. Jepsen – Heerenveen – 1997–99
- Timmi Johansen – Heerenveen – 2006–09
- Mathias Jørgensen – PSV – 2012–14
- Nicolai Jørgensen – Feyenoord – 2016–21
- Mads Junker – Vitesse, Roda JC – 2006–12
- Simon Karkov – Heerenveen – 1996–97
- Morten Karlsen – PEC Zwolle – 2002–04
- Jens Kolding – Roda JC – 1976–80
- Jørgen Kristensen – Sparta Rotterdam, Feyenoord – 1968–76
- Thomas Kristensen – ADO Den Haag – 2014–16
- Tommy Kristiansen – Go Ahead Eagles, Feyenoord, HFC Haarlem – 1976–84
- Michael Krohn-Dehli – RKC Waalwijk, Ajax, Sparta Rotterdam – 2004–08
- Kasper Kusk – Twente – 2014–15
- Claus Larsen – Sparta Rotterdam – 1975–76
- Kasper Larsen – Groningen – 2015–18
- Søren Larsen – Feyenoord – 2010–11
- Brian Laudrup – Ajax – 1999–2000
- Michael Laudrup – Ajax – 1997–98
- Nikolai Laursen – Emmen, Heracles Almelo – 2019–22
- Søren Lerby – Ajax, PSV – 1975–83, 1987–90
- Søren Lindsted – Twente – 1979–82
- Michael Lumb – Feyenoord – 2010–11
- Kasper Lunding – Heracles Almelo – 2020–22
- Nicolas Madsen – Heerenveen – 2021–22
- Ole Madsen – Sparta Rotterdam – 1965–68
- Simon Makienok – Utrecht – 2018–20
- Nicholas Marfelt – Sparta Rotterdam – 2017–18
- Magnus Mattsson – NEC – 2021–24
- Torben Mikkelsen – Telstar – 1977–78
- Jan Mølby – Ajax – 1982–84
- Peter Møller – PSV – 1997–98
- Patrick Mtiliga – Excelsior, Feyenoord, NAC – 2002–03, 2004–09
- Henning Munk Jensen – PSV – 1970–73
- **Younes Namli** – Heerenveen, **PEC Zwolle**, Sparta Rotterdam – 2014–19, 2022–
- Allan Nielsen – Roda JC – 1979–81
- Anders Nielsen – PSV, RKC Waalwijk, Sparta Rotterdam – 1996–02
- Claus Nielsen – Twente – 1989–91
- Ivan Nielsen – Feyenoord, PSV – 1979–90
- Lasse Nielsen – NEC – 2013–14
- Rasmus Nissen – Ajax – 2017–19
- Morten Nordstrand – Groningen – 2009–10
- Hjalte Nørregaard – Heerenveen – 2005–06
- Kristen Nygaard – AZ – 1972–82
- Marc Nygaard – Heerenveen, MVV, Roda JC, Excelsior – 1995–2003
- **Chido Obi** – **Willem II** – 2026–
- Jens Odgaard – Heerenveen, RKC Waalwijk, AZ Alkmaar – 2019–20, 2021–24
- Jeppe Okkels – Utrecht – 2023–24
- Jesper Olsen – Ajax – 1981–84
- John Steen Olsen – DOS Utrecht, Utrecht, Feyenoord – 1969–76
- Keld Pedersen – GVAV – 1967–69
- Nicklas Pedersen – Groningen, Emmen – 2008–12, 2018–19
- Kenneth Perez – MVV, AZ, PSV, Ajax, Twente – 1997–2010
- Bjarne Petersen – FC Amsterdam – 1975–77
- Dan Petersen – Ajax – 1991–94
- Jannik Pohl – Groningen – 2018–19
- Christian Poulsen – Ajax – 2012–14
- Jakob Poulsen – Heerenveen – 2005–08
- Simon Poulsen – AZ, PSV – 2007–12, 2013–15, 2015–16
- Flemming Povlsen – PSV – 1989–90
- Christian Rasmussen – Ajax – 2022–23, 2024–25
- Jacob Rasmussen – Vitesse, Feyenoord – 2020–23
- Jesper Rasmussen – PEC Zwolle – 1978–80
- Søren Rieks – NEC – 2012–14
- Emil Riis Jakobsen – VVV – 2017–18
- Dennis Rommedahl – PSV, RKC Waalwijk, Ajax NEC – 1996–2004, 2007–10
- Mathias Ross – NEC – 2023–24
- Bent Schmidt Hansen – PSV – 1967–75
- Lasse Schöne – De Graafschap, NEC, Ajax, Heerenveen – 2007–19, 2020–25
- Michael Silberbauer – Utrecht – 2008–11
- Arne Skipper – Sparta Rotterdam – 1974–76
- Morten Skoubo – Utrecht, Roda JC – 2008–11
- **Tobias Sommer** – **PEC Zwolle** – 2026–
- Tom Søndergaard – Ajax – 1969–70
- **Elias Sørensen** – **PEC Zwolle** – 2026–
- Jan Sørensen – Twente, Feyenoord, Excelsior, Ajax – 1982–89
- Niels Sörensen – FC Amsterdam – 1975–77
- Ole Sørensen – PSV – 1966–68
- Peter Sørensen – Groningen – 1996–97
- Per Steffensen – Twente – 1989–91
- Bo Storm – Heerenveen – 2006–07
- **Tobias Storm** – **NEC** – 2026–
- Kevin Stuhr Ellegaard – Heerenveen – 2010–11
- Anders Sundstrup – AZ – 1982–85
- Sebastian Svärd – Roda JC – 2010–11
- Jeppe Tengbjerg – Cambuur – 1993–96
- Casper Tengstedt – Feyenoord – 2025–26
- **Søren Tengstedt** – **Go Ahead Eagles** – 2023–
- Rasmus Thelander – Vitesse – 2018–19
- Thomas Thorninger – PSV – 1992–94
- Ole Tobiasen – Heerenveen, Ajax, AZ – 1995–2002
- Jon Dahl Tomasson – Heerenveen, Feyenoord – 1994–97, 1998–2002, 2008–11
- Michael Tørnes – Vitesse – 2016–18
- **Jacob Trenskow** – **Heerenveen** – 2024–
- **Niklas Vesterlund** – **Utrecht** – 2023–
- Peter Vindahl Jensen – AZ – 2021–22
- Sammy Youssouf – RBC Roosendaal – 2003–05
- Sten Ziegler – Roda JC, Ajax – 1974–79, 1980–82
- Niki Zimling – NEC, Ajax – 2010–11, 2014–15

== Dominican Republic ==
- Juan Castillo – AZ, ADO Den Haag, RKC Waalwijk – 2020–21, 2024–25
- Francisco Marizán – Volendam – 2023–24
- Pablo Rosario – PSV – 2017–21

== Ecuador ==
- Giovanny Espinoza – Vitesse – 2007–08
- Renato Ibarra – Vitesse – 2011–15
- Édison Méndez – PSV – 2006–09
- Diego Palacios – Willem II – 2018–19
- Jhonny Quiñónez – Willem II – 2019–20
- José Valencia – NEC, Willem II – 2004–09
- John Yeboah – VVV-Venlo, Willem II – 2019–22

== El Salvador ==
- Enrico Hernández – Vitesse – 2020–22

== Egypt ==
- Sherif Ekramy – Feyenoord – 2005–08
- Hazem Emam – De Graafschap – 1998–2000
- Haytham Farouk – Feyenoord – 1996–97
- Hossam Ghaly – Feyenoord – 2003–06
- Alexander Jakobsen – RKC Waalwijk – 2024–25
- Mido – Ajax – 2001–03, 2010–11

== England ==
- **Emeka Adiele** – **Utrecht** – 2025–
- Chuba Akpom – Ajax – 2023–25
- Billy Ashcroft – Twente – 1982–83, 1984–85
- Jean-Michel d'Avray – NEC – 1990–91
- Colin Ayre – Telstar – 1975–76
- Lewis Baker – Vitesse – 2015–17
- Michael Ball – PSV – 2005–06
- Dave Bennett – MVV – 1984–85
- **Adrian Blake** – **Utrecht** – 2023–
- Omar Bogle – ADO Den Haag – 2019–20
- Jarrad Branthwaite – PSV – 2022–23
- Garry Brooke – Groningen – 1988–89
- Ashley Smith-Brown – NAC – 2016–17
- Isaiah Brown – Vitesse – 2015–16
- Isaac Buckley-Ricketts – Twente – 2017–18
- Mark Burke – Fortuna Sittard – 1995–99
- Greg Campbell – Sparta Rotterdam – 1987–89
- Roy Carey – PSV – 1957–58
- Lee Cattermole – VVV-Venlo – 2019–20
- Max Clark – Vitesse – 2018–20
- Ray Clarke – Sparta Rotterdam, Ajax – 1976–79
- Jake Clarke-Salter – Vitesse – 2018–19
- Charlie Colkett – Vitesse – 2017–18
- Steve Cooper – NAC – 1984–85
- George Cox – Fortuna Sittard, Volendam – 2019–24
- Daniel Crowley – Go Ahead Eagles, Willem II – 2016–19
- Fankaty Dabo – Vitesse – 2017–18
- George Dobson – Sparta Rotterdam – 2017–18
- Louie Donowa – Willem II – 1988–89
- Andrew Driver – De Graafschap – 2015–16
- Mark Duffy – ADO Den Haag – 2019–20
- Kiano Dyer – Volendam – 2025–26
- Chris Eagles – NEC – 2006–07
- Graham Edwards – VVV-Venlo – 1959–61
- Shay Facey – Heerenveen – 2016–17
- Mark Farrington – Willem II, Fortuna Sittard, Feyenoord – 1987–88, 1989–91
- Josh Flint – Volendam – 2022–24
- Jamie Forrester – Utrecht – 1999–2000
- Ron Futcher – NAC – 1984–85
- Douglas George – HFC Haarlem, Sparta Rotterdam – 1974–80, 1982–83
- Steve Goble – Groningen, Utrecht – 1981–83, 1984–86
- Ronny Goodlass – FC Den Haag, NAC – 1977–80
- Chris Guthrie – Willem II, Roda JC – 1982–85
- Gary Heale – Sparta Rotterdam – 1982–83
- Jordan Henderson – Ajax – 2023–25
- Phil Henson – Sparta Rotterdam – 1977–78
- Michael Higdon – NEC – 2013–14
- Gordon Hill – Twente – 1985–86
- James Horsfield – Breda – 2017–18
- Sam Hutchinson – Vitesse – 2013–14
- Geoff Hutt – HFC Haarlem – 1976–77
- Michael Jeffrey – Fortuna Sittard – 1995–99
- David Jones – NEC – 2005–06
- Todd Kane – NEC – 2015–16
- Joe Keenan – Willem II – 2005–07
- Terry Lees – Sparta Rotterdam, Roda JC, DS'79 – 1976–79, 1982–84
- John Linford – DS'79, NAC, Fortuna Sittard, Utrecht – 1983–91
- David Loggie – Sparta Rotterdam, AZ, Willem II – 1980–82, 1983–91
- Noni Madueke – PSV – 2019–23
- Keith Masefield – HFC Haarlem – 1977–88
- Paul Mason – Groningen – 1983–88
- Teddy Maybank – PSV – 1980–81
- James McConnell – Ajax – 2025–26
- Rob McDonald – FC Wageningen, Willem II, Groningen, PSV – 1980–87
- Josh McEachran – Vitesse – 2014–15
- Tony McNulty – PEC Zwolle – 1986–87
- Tafari Moore – Utrecht – 2016–17
- Nicky Morgan – FC Den Haag – 1981–82
- Tony Morley – FC Den Haag – 1986–87
- Mason Mount – Vitesse – 2017–18
- Derry Murkin – Volendam, Utrecht – 2022–24, 2025–26
- **Reiss Nelson** – **Feyenoord** – 2021–22, 2026–
- Gordon Nutt – PSV – 1961–62
- Stuart Parker – Sparta Rotterdam – 1978–79
- Marcus Phillips – Utrecht – 1995–96
- Duncan Pratt – HFC Haarlem, NEC – 1976–80
- Richie Reynolds – HFC Haarlem – 1976–77
- Ray Richardson – Heracles, AZ, RKC Waalwijk – 1985–87, 1990–93
- Peter Robinson – Sparta Rotterdam – 1980–82
- Bassala Sambou – Fortuna Sittard – 2019–22
- Shola Shoretire – PEC Zwolle – 2025–26
- Jerome Sinclair – VVV-Venlo – 2019–20
- Mike Small – Go Ahead Eagles – 1982–85, 1986–87
- Dominic Solanke – Vitesse – 2015–16
- Jordan Spence – ADO Den Haag – 2019–20
- Phil Starbuck – RKC Waalwijk – 1996–97
- Raheem Sterling – Feyenoord – 2025–26
- Floyd Streete – Utrecht – 1983–84
- Sam Stubbs – ADO Den Haag – 2019–20
- Peter Thomson – NAC – 1998–2000
- John Webb – MVV – 1978–80
- Charlie Webster – Heerenveen – 2023–24
- Trevor Whymark – Sparta Rotterdam – 1979–80
- Dean Wilkins – PEC Zwolle – 1984–85, 1986–87
- Matty Willock – Utrecht – 2017–18
- Carl Wilson – Sparta Rotterdam – 1962–63
- Colin Withers – Go Ahead Eagles – 1970–71
- Andy Wright – Fortuna Sittard – 2001–02
- Kevin Young – Utrecht – 1986–90

== Equatorial Guinea ==
- Álex Balboa – Almere City – 2024–25

== Eritrea ==
- Tesfaldet Tekie – Fortuna Sittard, Go Ahead Eagles – 2019–23

== Estonia ==
- Ragnar Klavan – Heracles, AZ – 2005–12
- Marko Meerits – Vitesse – 2011–12
- Karol Mets – Breda – 2017–19
- Henrik Ojamaa – Go Ahead Eagles – 2016–17
- Andres Oper – Roda JC, ADO Den Haag – 2005–10
- Raio Piiroja – Vitesse – 2011–12
- Rocco Robert Shein – Utrecht – 2021–23

== Finland ==
- Oliver Antman – Groningen, Go Ahead Eagles – 2022–23, 2024–25
- Jasin Assehnoun – Emmen – 2022–23
- **Tomas Galvez** – **Go Ahead Eagles** – 2026–
- Hannu Haarala – Heerenveen – 2002–05
- Juha Hakola – Heracles, Willem II – 2008–11
- Sami Hyypiä – Willem II – 1995–99
- Fredrik Jensen – Twente – 2016–18
- Richard Jensen – Twente – 2017–18
- Aleksei Kangaskolkka – Heracles – 2013–14
- Rasmus Karjalainen – Fortuna Sittard – 2019–20
- **Juho Kilo** – **ADO Den Haag** – 2026–
- Joonas Kolkka – Willem II, PSV, ADO Den Haag, Feyenoord, NAC – 1995–2001, 2005–11
- Marko Kolsi – Willem II – 2004–06
- Peter Kopteff – Utrecht – 2006–08
- Jukka Koskinen – Willem II – 1997–99
- Jussi Kujala – De Graafschap – 2010–12
- Juha-Pekka Laine – MVV – 1975–76
- Thomas Lam – AZ, PEC Zwolle, Twente – 2012–13, 2014–16, 2017–22, 2023–24
- Veli Lampi – Willem II – 2010–11
- Mika Lipponen – Twente – 1985–89
- Jari Litmanen – Ajax – 1992–99, 2002–04
- Niki Mäenpää – Willem II, VVV-Venlo – 2009–11, 2012–13
- Niklas Moisander – AZ, Ajax – 2008–15
- Jussi Nuorela – Groningen – 1994–95
- Mika Nurmela – Heerenveen, Heracles – 1999–2003, 2005–06
- Marco Parnela – FC Zwolle – 2003–04
- Petri Pasanen – Ajax – 2000–04
- Mika Pulkkinen – Heerenveen – 1999–2000
- Timo Rahja – MVV – 1974–75
- Mikko Rahkamaa – Twente – 2002–04
- Jukka Raitala – Heerenveen – 2012–15
- Patrik Raitanen – Fortuna Sittard – 2019–20
- Juha Reini – AZ – 2002–04, 2005–06
- Paulus Roiha – Utrecht, FC Zwolle, ADO Den Haag – 2001–04, 2005–07
- Janne Saksela – Sparta Rotterdam – 2016–17, 2018–19
- Tim Sparv – Groningen – 2009–13
- Antti Sumiala – NEC, Twente – 1995–99
- Teemu Tainio – Ajax – 2010–11
- Juho Talvitie – Heracles Almelo, NAC – 2024–26
- Niklas Tarvajärvi – Heerenveen, De Graafschap, Vitesse – 2005–09
- **Casper Terho** – **Sparta Rotterdam** – 2025–
- Petri Tiainen – Ajax – 1986–88
- Ville Väisänen – De Graafschap – 1997–2000
- Mika Väyrynen – Heerenveen, PSV – 2001–11

== France ==
- Makan Aïko – Fortuna Sittard – 2024–26
- Thierry Ambrose – NAC Breda – 2017–18
- Rémi Amieux – NEC, RKC Waalwijk, NAC – 2010–15
- Grégoire Amiot – Fortuna Sittard – 2019–21
- **Ethan Apkakou** – **Cambuur** – 2026–
- Mathieu Assou-Ekotto – Willem II – 2005–07
- Samy Baghdadi – Fortuna Sittard – 2021–22
- Jean-Christophe Bahebeck – Utrecht – 2017–18
- Théo Barbet – Almere City – 2023–25
- Jean-David Beauguel – RKC Waalwijk – 2013–14
- Lucas Bernadou – Emmen – 2020–23
- **Darling Bladi** – **Heerenveen** – 2026–
- Olivier Boscagli – PSV – 2019–25
- Amine Boutrah – Vitesse – 2023–24
- Jérémie Bréchet – PSV – 2008–09
- **Yoann Cathline** – Almere City, **Utrecht** – 2023–
- Teddy Chevalier – RKC Waalwijk – 2012–13
- Cyril Chevreuil – Sparta Rotterdam – 2016–17
- Karim Coulibaly – Willem II – 2017–20
- **Morgan Costarelli** – **Cambuur** – 2026–
- Logan Delaurier-Chaubet – Almere City – 2024–25
- Joris Delle – NEC, Feyenoord – 2016–17, 2018–19
- Matthieu Delpierre – Utrecht – 2013–14
- Mahamadou Dembélé – Fortuna Sittard – 2018–19
- Dorian Dervite – Breda – 2018–19
- David Di Tommaso – Utrecht – 2004–06
- Djibril Dianessy – Fortuna Sittard – 2018–19, 2020–21
- **Thomas Didillon-Hödl** – **Willem II** – 2024–25, 2026–
- Marc Olivier Doue – PEC Zwolle – 2019–21
- Édouard Duplan – Sparta Rotterdam, Utrecht, ADO Den Haag – 2007–18
- Noam Emeran – Groningen – 2024–26
- Julien Escudé – Ajax – 2003–06
- Marc-Antoine Fortuné – Utrecht – 2005–07
- Nicolas Gavory – Utrecht – 2018–19
- Prince-Désir Gouano – RKC Waalwijk – 2013–14
- Vincent Gouttebarge – FC Volendam – 1997–98
- Axel Guessand – Volendam – 2023–24
- **Ilyes Hamache** – **Cambuur** – 2026–
- Nicolas Isimat-Mirin – PSV, Vitesse – 2014–19, 2022–24
- **Noé Lebreton** – **NEC** – 2025–
- Albert Lottin – Utrecht – 2022–23
- Arnaud Luzayadio – Emmen – 2022–23
- Zinédine Machach – VVV-Venlo – 2020–21
- **Lanroy Machine** – **Heerenveen** – 2026–
- Didier Martel – Utrecht, Vitesse – 1998–2003
- Robin Maulun – Cambuur, Volendam – 2021–24
- Loïc Mbe Soh – Almere City – 2023–24
- **Édouard Michut** – **Fortuna Sittard** – 2024–
- Marko Muslin – Willem II – 2005–06
- Louis Nganioni – Utrecht – 2015–16
- Hervin Ongenda – PEC Zwolle – 2016–17
- Brayann Pereira – NEC – 2023–27
- Florian Pinteaux – Sparta Rotterdam – 2016–17
- **Alassane Pléa** – **PSV** – 2025–
- Jeff Reine-Adélaïde – Heracles Almelo – 2025–26
- **Maxence Rivera** – **Heerenveen** – 2025–
- Thomas Robinet – Almere City – 2023–25
- Loreintz Rosier – Fortuna Sittard – 2023–25
- Amine Salama – NAC – 2025–26
- Florent Sanchez – Volendam – 2022–23
- Yaya Sanogo – Ajax – 2015–16
- Sébastien Sansoni – Vitesse – 2006–09
- **Kiliann Sildillia** – **PSV** – 2025–
- **Abdelnour Soualhia** – **Telstar** – 2026–
- Moussa Soumano – NAC – 2025–26
- Azzeddine Toufiqui – Emmen – 2022–23
- **Daouda Weidmann** – RKC Waalwijk, **Twente** – 2023–
- Romaric Yapi – Vitesse – 2021–23

== Gabon ==
- Kévin Mayi – NEC – 2016–17
- David Sambissa – Cambuur – 2021–23

== Gambia ==
- Jatto Ceesay – Willem II – 1995–2006
- Leon Guwara – Utrecht, VVV-Venlo – 2018–21
- Ebrima Ebou Sillah – RBC Roosendaal – 2002–03, 2005–06
- Yankuba Minteh – Feyenoord – 2023–24
- Edrissa Sonko – Roda JC – 2000–07

== Georgia ==
- Giorgi Aburjania – Twente – 2019–20
- Archil Arveladze – NAC – 1997–2000
- Shota Arveladze – Ajax, AZ – 1997–2001, 2005–07
- Giorgi Chanturia – Vitesse – 2011–14
- Giorgi Demetradze – Feyenoord – 1997–98
- Giorgi Gakhokidze – PSV, Twente – 1998–99, 2000–07
- Guram Kashia – Vitesse – 2010–18
- Valeri Kazaishvili – Vitesse – 2011–17
- Georgi Kinkladze – Ajax – 1998–99
- Georges Mikautadze – Ajax – 2023–24
- **Irakli Yegoian** – **Excelsior** – 2025–

== Germany ==
=== A ===
- Ragnar Ache – Sparta Rotterdam – 2016–18, 2019–20
- Atakan Akkaynak – Willem II – 2018–19
- Marcel Appiah – NEC – 2014–16
- Wolfram Arnthof – Heracles – 1962–66
- Jonas Arweiler – Utrecht, ADO Den Haag – 2019–21
- Ralf Augustin – Fortuna Sittard – 1982–83
- Maxime Awoudja – Excelsior – 2022–23

=== B ===
- Mio Backhaus – Volendam – 2023–24
- Benjamin Baltes – Excelsior – 2010–11
- Oliver Batista Meier – Heerenveen – 2020–21
- Timo Baumgartl – PSV – 2019–21
- Joep Beckers – Sittardia – 1959–65
- Armel Bella-Kotchap – PSV – 2023–24
- Steven Benda – Feyenoord – 2025–26
- Willy Bergstein – MVV – 1965–67
- Jan-Niklas Beste – Emmen – 2019–20
- Horst Blankenburg – Ajax – 1970–75
- Janis Blaswich – Heracles Almelo – 2018–22
- Uwe Blotenberg – Twente, FC Wageningen – 1969–70, 1974–75
- Robert Böhm – VVV-Venlo – 2009–10
- Herbert Bönnen – NEC – 1967–72
- Axel Borgmann – VVV-Venlo – 2018–19
- Mirco Born – Twente – 2012–13
- Can Bozdoğan – Utrecht – 2022–26
- **Julian Brandt** – **AFC Ajax** – 2026–
- Enis Bunjaki – Twente – 2016–17
- Dieter Burdenski – Vitesse – 1990–91
- **Jan Bürger** – **PEC Zwolle** – 2026–
- Gerd Burkhardt – Blauw-Wit – 1963–64

=== C ===
- **Jason Ceka** – **Cambuur** – 2026–
- Jeff Chabot – Sparta Rotterdam, Groningen – 2017–19
- **Emmanuel Chigozie Owen** – **Utrecht** – 2026–
- Amara Condé – Heerenveen – 2024–25
- Christian Conteh – Feyenoord – 2020
- Simon Cziommer – Twente, Roda JC, AZ, Utrecht, Vitesse, Heracles – 2000–09, 2012–15
- Lennart Czyborra – Heracles, PEC Zwolle – 2018–20, 2023–24

=== D ===
- **Eric da Silva Moreira** – **Excelsior** – 2026–
- Dominique Diroux – Breda – 1996–98
- Christian Dorda – Heracles, Utrecht – 2012–14

=== E ===
- Chinedu Ede – Twente – 2015–17
- Mario Engels – Roda JC, Sparta Rotterdam, Heracles Almelo – 2017–18, 2020–22, 2023–26
- **Tjark Ernst** – **Feyenoord** – 2026–
- Paul Ewe – Rapid JC – 1961–62

=== F ===
- Adrian Fein – PSV, Excelsior – 2020–21, 2022–23
- Dimitrios Ferfelis – PEC Zwolle – 2014–15
- Herbert Finken – Heracles – 1962–64
- Uwe Fischer – Fortuna '54, Fortuna SC – 1966–69
- André Fomitschow – NEC – 2016–17
- Helmuth Fottner – SC Enschede – 1957–58
- Wolfgang Frank – AZ – 1973–74

=== G ===
- **Dennis Geiger** – **NEC** – 2026–
- Nelson Gonçalves da Costa – Twente – 2003–04
- Lukas Görtler – Utrecht – 2017–19
- Robin Gosens – Dordrecht, Heracles – 2014–17
- Volker Graul – Den Bosch – 1972–73
- Dieter Gresens – RKSV Sittardia – 1964–65
- Ashton Götz – Roda JC – 2017–18
- Mario Götze – PSV – 2020–22
- Volkmar Groß – Twente – 1974–77

=== H ===
- Julian von Haacke – NEC – 2016–17
- Philipp Haastrup – Willem II – 2012–13
- Tobias Haitz – NEC – 2013–14
- Tim Handwerker – Groningen – 2018–19 Utrecht - 2023-24
- Georg Hecht – MVV – 1956–58
- Niclas Heimann – VVV-Venlo – 2012–13
- Ogechika Heil – Go Ahead Eagles – 2021–22
- Michael Heinloth – NEC – 2016–18
- Christoph Hemlein – NEC – 2013–14
- Herbert Herbst – Rapid JC – 1962
- Lorenz Hilkes – VVV-Venlo – 1974–75, 1979–80
- Heinz Höher – Twente – 1965–66
- Tim Hölscher – Twente – 2012–17
- Lewis Holtby – NAC – 2025–26
- Jannik Huth – Sparta Rotterdam – 2017–18

=== J ===
- Sebastian Jakubiak – Heracles – 2017–18, 2019–20
- Dieter Janssen – VVV-Venlo – 1961–62
- Jürgen Jendrossek – NEC – 1969–71

=== K ===
- **Almugera Kabar** – **NEC** – 2026–
- Josef Kaczor – Feyenoord – 1981–82
- Jörg Kaessmann – Roda JC – 1997–98
- Herbert Kalz – Rapid JC – 1957–58
- Wolfram Kaminke – DOS Utrecht – 1968–69
- Emilio Kehrer – Willem II – 2024–25
- **Thilo Kehrer** – **Ajax** – 2026–
- Orestis Kiomourtzoglou – Heracles – 2019–22
- Thorsten Kirschbaum – VVV-Venlo – 2019–21
- Benjamin Kirsten – NEC – 2015–16
- Georg Koch – PSV – 1997–98
- Mats Köhlert – Willem II, Heerenveen – 2019–25
- Guido Kopp – VVV-Venlo – 1984–86
- Werner Korndörfer – Breda – 1972
- Willi Kraus – Go Ahead Eagles – 1963–64
- Franz Krauthausen – FC Volendam – 1977–78
- Florian Krüger – Groningen – 2022–23
- Günther Kurek – NEC – 1981–82

=== L ===
- Georg Lambert – Willem II, USV Elinkwijk – 1960–62, 1966–67
- Alexander Laukart – Twente – 2017–18
- Rolf Lendzian – SC Enschede – 1961–62
- Thilo Leugers – Twente, NAC – 2010–13
- Heinz Libuda – GVAV – 1966–67
- Peter Lübeke – Ajax – 1977–78
- Kilian Ludewig – Willem II – 2021–22
- Andreas Ludwig – Utrecht – 2015–17

=== M ===
- Matthias Maiwald – DOS Utrecht, Feyenoord, Go Ahead Eagles – 1967–75
- Braydon Manu – PEC Zwolle – 2024–25
- Philipp Max – PSV – 2020–23
- Thomas Meißner – ADO Den Haag, Willem II – 2016–19
- Kai Michalke – Heracles Almelo – 2006–08
- Jürgen Müller – Willem II, PEC Zwolle – 1983–85

=== N ===
- Abdenego Nankishi – Heracles Almelo – 2023–24
- **Gerrit Nauber** – **Go Ahead Eagles** – 2021–
- Nico Neidhart – Emmen – 2018–19
- Richard Neudecker – VVV – 2019–20
- Peter Niemeyer – Twente – 2002–07
- Horst Nussbaum – PSV – 1965–66
- Reagy Ofosu – NEC – 2016–17
- Samir Ouindi – Roda JC – 2000–01

=== O ===
- Eric Oelschlägel – Utrecht, Emmen – 2020–23

=== P ===
- Tobias Pachonik – VVV-Venlo – 2019–22
- Dragan Paljić – Heracles – 2012–14
- Erwin Palm – MVV – 1975–76
- Felix Passlack – Fortuna Sittard – 2019–20
- Raul Paula – NAC Breda – 2024–26
- Nico Pellatz – Excelsior – 2010–11
- Hans Pfeiffer – SC Enschede – 1960–62
- Michael Pfeiffer – Fortuna '54 – 1961–63
- David Philipp – ADO Den Haag – 2020–21
- Martin Pieckenhagen – Heracles – 2005–10
- Luca Plogmann – Go Ahead Eagles – 2024–25
- **Ferdinand Pohl** – **Utrecht** – 2026–
- Sebastian Polter – Fortuna Sittard – 2020–21
- Gerrit Pressel – Willem II – 2010–11
- Manfred Priewe – NEC – 1973–75
- Nick Proschwitz – Sparta Rotterdam – 2017–18

=== R ===
- Helmut Rahn – SC Enschede – 1960–63
- Diant Ramaj – Ajax – 2023–25
- Willy Reitgaßl – RKSV Sittardia – 1967–68
- **Marco Rente** – Heracles, **Groningen** – 2020–22, 2024–
- Kurt Rettkowski – Go Ahead Eagles, VVV – 1974–79
- Norbert Ringels – VVV-Venlo – 1985–87
- Paulo Rink – Vitesse – 2003–04
- Ferdi Rohde – Twente – 1980–84
- Nils Röseler – Twente, VVV-Venlo – 2011–14, 2017–20
- Maximilian Rossmann – Heracles – 2018–20

=== S ===
- Stephen Sama – Heracles – 2018–19
- Werner Schaaphok – Ajax – 1959–65
- Steffen Schäfer – VVV-Venlo – 2019–21
- Dani Schahin – Roda JC – 2016–18
- Lukas Schmitz – VVV-Venlo – 2020–21
- Sam Schreck – Groningen – 2019–21
- Markus Schubert – Vitesse – 2021–22
- Daniel Schwaab – PSV – 2016–20
- Dieter Schwemmle – Twente – 1973–74
- Sepp Seemann – SC Enschede – 1957–58
- Dieter Sevens – NEC – 1979–80
- Jörg Sobiech – NEC, Twente – 1996–2000
- Sven Sonnenberg – Heracles Almelo – 2021–22, 2023–24
- Elia Soriano – VVV-Venlo – 2019–20
- Karl–Heinz Spikofski – VVV-Venlo – 1957–59
- Arno Steffenhagen – Ajax – 1974–76
- Rico Steinmann – Twente – 1997–2000
- Horst-Dieter Strich – PSV – 1965–66
- Rico Strieder – Utrecht, PEC Zwolle – 2015–22
- Marcel Stutter – NEC – 2012–14
- Ulrich Surau – NEC – 1977–79
- Anthony Syhre – Fortuna Sittard – 2018–19

=== T ===
- **Marc-André ter Stegen** – **Ajax** – 2026–
- Stefan Thesker – Twente – 2015–18
- Rolf Thiemann – Go Ahead Eagles – 1963–67
- Lennart Thy – VVV-Venlo, PEC Zwolle, Sparta Rotterdam – 2017–22, 2023–24
- Idrissa Touré – Vitesse – 2020–21
- Tom Trybull – ADO Den Haag – 2016–17
- **Osman Turay** – **Excelsior** – 2026–

=== U ===
- **Lars Unnerstall** – VVV-Venlo, PSV, **Twente** – 2017–
- Mark Uth – Heerenveen, Heracles – 2012–15

=== V ===
- Jochen Vieten – VVV-Venlo – 1976–79
- Karl Vigna – MVV – 1960–61
- Alexander Voigt – Roda JC – 2005–06

=== W ===
- Lasse Wehmeyer – Heracles Almelo – 2023–24
- Werner Weigel – MVV – 1965–66
- Bastian Weiser – NEC – 2009–10
- Timon Wellenreuther – Willem II, Feyenoord – 2017–20, 2021–26
- Heiko Westermann – Ajax – 2016–17
- Jannes Wieckhoff – Heracles Almelo – 2023–26
- Felix Wiedwald – Emmen – 2020–21
- **Lasse Wilhelm** – **ADO Den Haag** – 2026–
- Jean Willrich – PSV – 1976–77
- Maximilian Wittek – Vitesse – 2020–24

=== Y ===
- Amin Younes – Ajax, Utrecht – 2015–18, 2022–23

=== Z ===
- André van der Zander – Fortuna Sittard – 1993–96
- Kurt Zaro – Willem II – 1957–60
- Michael Zetterer – PEC Zwolle – 2019–21

== Ghana ==
- Eric Addo – PSV, Roda JC – 1999–2011
- Joseph Addo – Sparta Rotterdam – 1996–97
- Thomas Agyepong – Twente – 2015–16
- Patrick Allotey – Feyenoord – 1998–99
- Matthew Amoah – Vitesse, Fortuna Sittard, NAC, Heracles – 1998–2012, 2013–14
- Anthony Annan – Vitesse – 2011–12
- Nana Asare – Utrecht – 2009–13
- Christian Atsu – Vitesse – 2013–14
- Eric Atuahene – Breda – 2004–05
- André Ayew – NAC – 2025–26
- Emmanuel Boakye – Ajax, Heracles, Sparta Rotterdam – 2005–11
- Richmond Boakye – Roda JC – 2015–16
- Francis Dickoh – Utrecht – 2006–10
- Augustus Dumbar – RKC Waalwijk – 1997–99
- Shadrach Eghan – Twente – 2012–16
- Christian Gyan – Feyenoord, Excelsior – 1997–2007
- Edwin Gyasi – De Graafschap, Twente, Heracles, Roda JC – 2011–16
- Elvis Hammond – RBC Roosendaal – 2004–05
- Ali Ibrahim Pelé – De Graafschap – 1996–98
- Abass Issah – Utrecht, Twente – 2019–21
- Abdul Rahman Issah – De Graafschap – 1999–2000
- Laryea Kingston – Vitesse – 2010–11
- Derrick Köhn – Willem II – 2020–22
- Mohammed Kudus – Ajax – 2020–24
- Samuel Kuffour – Ajax – 2007–08
- Nii Lamptey – PSV – 1993–94
- Odartey Lawson – Utrecht – 1997–98
- Derrick Luckassen – AZ, PSV – 2014–18
- Elvis Manu – Feyenoord, Cambuur, Go Ahead Eagles – 2011–15, 2016–17
- Dauda Mohammed – Vitesse – 2018–19
- Divine Naah – Breda – 2014–15
- Anthony Obodai – Ajax, Sparta Rotterdam, RKC Waalwijk – 2003–10
- Denis Odoi – NAC – 2025–26
- Ibrahim Osman – Feyenoord – 2024–25
- Quincy Owusu-Abeyie – NEC – 2016–17
- Prince Polley – Sparta Rotterdam, Twente, Heerenveen – 1988–90, 1992–95
- Robin Polley – ADO Den Haag, Heracles – 2019–20, 2021–22
- Kwame Quansah – Ajax, Heracles – 2000–01, 2005–14
- Ibrahim Sadiq – AZ – 2023–26
- Kamal Sowah – AZ Alkmaar, NAC – 2021–22, 2024–26
- Kwasi Okyere Wriedt – Willem II – 2020–22
- Abubakari Yakubu – Ajax, Vitesse – 1999–2009
- Yaw Yeboah – Twente – 2016–17

== Grenada ==
- Darius Johnson – Volendam – 2022–24

== Greece ==
- Yannis Anastasiou – Roda JC, Ajax, Sparta Rotterdam – 2000–07
- **Vasilis Barkas** – **Utrecht** – 2022–
- Giannis-Fivos Botos – Go Ahead Eagles – 2021–22
- Kostas Chaniotakis – Vitesse – 1998–2000
- Angelos Charisteas – Ajax, Feyenoord – 2004–07
- Argyris Darelas – NEC – 2024–25
- Kostas Dedeletakis – De Graafschap – 2000–01
- **Theodoros Delianidis** – **Feyenoord** – 2026–
- Anastasios Donis – VVV-Venlo – 2020–21
- Christos Donis – VVV-Venlo – 2020–21
- Anastasios Douvikas – Utrecht – 2021–24
- James Efmorfidis – RKC Waalwijk – 2020–21
- Dimitrios Emmanouilidis – Fortuna Sittard – 2020–21
- Giorgos Giakoumakis – VVV-Venlo – 2020–21
- Pantelis Hatzidiakos – AZ – 2015–24
- Dimitrios Ioannidis – Fortuna Sittard – 2018–20
- Nikolaos Ioannidis – PEC Zwolle – 2014–15
- Argyris Kampetsis – Willem II – 2021–22
- Thanasis Karagounis – PEC Zwolle – 2013–18
- Nikos Karelis – ADO Den Haag – 2020–21
- Giorgos Katsikas – Twente – 2015–17
- Dimitris Kolovos – Willem II – 2018–19
- Lefteris Lyratzis – NEC – 2024–25
- Kostas Lamprou – Feyenoord, Willem II, Ajax, RKC Waalwijk, PEC Zwolle, NAC – 2012–19, 2020–22, 2024–26
- Lazaros Lamprou – Fortuna Sittard, Twente, Excelsior – 2018–19, 2020–21, 2022–24
- Dimitrios Limnios – Twente, Fortuna Sittard – 2021–22, 2025–26
- Konstantinos Loumpoutis – Twente, ADO Den Haag – 2005–07
- Nikos Machlas – Vitesse, Ajax – 1996–2003
- Giannis Masouras – Sparta Rotterdam – 2021–22
- Nikolaos Michelis – Willem II – 2021–22
- Kostas Mitroglou – PSV – 2019–20
- Thanasis Papazoglou – Roda JC – 2016–17
- Vangelis Pavlidis – Willem II, AZ – 2018–24
- Lazaros Rota – Fortuna Sittard – 2020-21
- Georgios Samaras – Heerenveen – 2002–06
- Andreas Samaris – Fortuna Sittard – 2021–22
- Dimitris Siovas – Fortuna Sittard – 2021–24
- Vasilios Sourlis – Fortuna Sittard – 2022–23
- Konstantinos Tsimikas – Willem II – 2017–18
- Gregor Tsinos – Roda JC – 1980–82
- Christos Tzolis – Twente – 2022–23
- Apostolos Vellios – PEC Zwolle – 2023–25
- Marios Vrousai – Willem II – 2018–20
- **Vasilios Zagaritis** – Almere City, **Heerenveen** – 2024–

== Guadeloupe ==
- Franck Grandel – Utrecht – 2005–08
- Loïc Loval – De Graafschap, Utrecht – 2004–05, 2007–10

== Guatemala ==
- Marco Pappa – Heerenveen – 2012–13

== Guinea ==
- Aliou Baldé – Feyenoord – 2020–22
- **Ibrahim Cissoko** – NEC, **PEC Zwolle** – 2021–23, 2026–
- Antoine Conde – Breda – 2000–01
- Mikael Dyrestam – NEC – 2015–17
- Ahmad Mendes Moreira – Groningen – 2018–19
- Mathias Pogba – Sparta Rotterdam – 2016–17
- Sekou Soumah – Willem II – 1992–95
- Mohamed Sylla – Willem II – 1989–95
- **Sekou Sylla** – Cambuur, **ADO Den Haag** – 2021–23, 2026–

== Guinea Bissau ==
- Edgar Ié – Feyenoord – 2019–20
- Janio Bikel – Heerenveen, NEC – 2014–17
- Francisco Júnior – Vitesse – 2013–14
- Houboulang Mendes – Fortuna Sittard – 2025–26

== Guyana ==
- Terell Ondaan – Willem II, Excelsior, Zwolle – 2014–19

== Haiti ==
- Carlens Arcus – Vitesse – 2022–24
- Hannes Delcroix – RKC Waalwijk – 2019–20
- Kim Jaggy – Sparta Rotterdam – 2008–09
- Jhondly van der Meer – Cambuur – 2021–22
- Ruben Providence – Almere City – 2024–25
- Richelor Sprangers – Breda – 2017–18

== Hungary ==
- Krisztián Adorján – Groningen – 2013–14
- Gábor Babos – NAC, Feyenoord, NEC – 2000–13
- Ferenc Banky – MVV – 1959–60
- **Donát Bárány** – **ADO Den Haag** – 2026–
- Janos Bedl – DWS, MVV – 1960–62, 1963–64
- Janos Beke – Telstar – 1964–65
- András Béres – SC Enschede – 1957–59
- Béla Bodnár – Sparta Rotterdam – 1962–64
- László Bodnár – Roda JC – 2004–06
- Boldizsár Bodor – Roda JC, NAC – 2004–11, 2013–14
- **Márk Csinger** – **Groningen** – 2026–
- Miklós Dacsev – VV DOS – 1962–65
- Áron Dobos – Fortuna Sittard – 2018–19
- Tibor Dombi – Utrecht – 2000–02
- Balázs Dzsudzsák – PSV – 2007–11
- Csaba Fehér – NAC, PSV, Willem II – 2000–11
- Pál Fischer – Ajax – 1989–90
- János Hanek – DOS Utrecht – 1960–62
- Gábor Horváth – NAC, ADO Den Haag – 2011–13
- Ádám Hrepka – NEC – 2007–08
- Tamás Kádár – Roda JC – 2012–13
- István Kenderesi – Twente – 1970–71
- Zsombor Kerekes – Willem II – 2005–07
- Gábor Keresztes – Willem II – 1962–64
- Milos Kerkez – AZ – 2021–23
- József Kiprich – Feyenoord – 1989–95
- Tamás Kiss – Cambuur – 2021–22
- **Bendegúz Kovács** – **AZ** – 2025–
- Attila Ladinszky – Feyenoord – 1971–73
- Barna Liebháber – AZ, Utrecht – 1969–70, 1974–75
- György Lipták – DOS Utrecht, Telstar – 1960–66
- Tibor Lőrincz – Alkmaar '54 – 1960–63
- László Mészáros – Fortuna Sittard – 2001–02
- Antal Nagy – Twente – 1969–72
- Gyula Nemes – SC Enschede, Twente, MVV – 1962–70
- Krisztián Németh – RKC Waalwijk, Roda JC – 2011–14
- Kenny Otigba – Heerenveen – 2012–16
- Tamás Pető – Breda – 2001–07
- Sándor Popovics – Sparta Rotterdam – 1963–64
- Balázs Rabóczki – Vitesse – 2007–08
- Antal Róth – Feyenoord – 1986–90
- András Simon – Excelsior – 2010–11
- Krisztián Simon – Feyenoord – 2010–11
- József Szalma – Fortuna Sittard – 1991–94
- István Szekér – Willem II – 1997–98
- Zoltán Szélesi – NEC – 2012–14
- Adrián Szőke – Heracles – 2019–22
- Gábor Torma – Roda JC, Groningen, RKC Waalwijk – 1997–02, 2003–04
- Balázs Tóth – VVV-Venlo – 2010–11
- Krisztián Vadócz – NEC – 2011–12
- László Vardai – MVV – 1964–65
- Zoltán Varga – Ajax – 1973–74
- Krisztián Vermes – Sparta Rotterdam – 2008–09
- Kristopher Vida – De Graafschap – 2015–16
- Gábor Zele – Twente – 1974–76

== Iceland ==
- Mikael Anderson – Excelsior – 2018–19
- Andri Baldursson – NEC – 2022–23
- Gunnar Einarsson – MVV – 1997–98
- Kristján Emilsson – NEC – 2015–16
- Alfreð Finnbogason – Heerenveen – 2012–14
- Kolbeinn Finnsson – Utrecht – 2024–25
- Eiður Guðjohnsen – PSV Eindhoven – 1995–96
- Joey Guðjónsson – MVV, RKC Waalwijk, AZ – 1999–02, 2006–07
- Albert Guðmundsson – PSV Eindhoven, AZ – 2017–22
- Jóhann Berg Guðmundsson – AZ – 2010–14
- Aron Gunnarsson – AZ – 2007–08
- Arnar Gunnlaugsson – Feyenoord – 1992–94
- Hannes Þór Halldórsson – NEC – 2015–16
- Jóhannes Harðarson – Groningen – 2001–04
- **Kristian Hlynsson** – Ajax, Sparta Rotterdam, **Twente** – 2023–
- Heimir Karlsson – Excelsior – 1984–85
- Kristófer Kristinsson – Willem II – 2017–19
- Ögmundur Kristinsson – Excelsior – 2017–18
- Elías Már Ómarsson – Excelsior, NAC – 2018–19, 2024–25
- Victor Pálsson – NEC – 2012–14
- Pétur Pétursson – Feyenoord – 1978–81, 1984–85
- **Alfons Sampsted** – Twente, **Go Ahead Eagles** – 2022–24, 2025–
- Kolbeinn Sigþórsson – AZ, Ajax – 2010–15
- **Stefán Ingi Sigurðarson** – **Go Ahead Eagles** – 2025–
- Rúnar Þór Sigurgeirsson – Willem II – 2024–25
- Arnór Smárason – Heerenveen – 2007–10
- Grétar Steinsson – AZ – 2005–08
- **Nökkvi Þeyr Þórisson** – Sparta Rotterdam, **Telstar** – 2024–
- **Ágúst Orri Þorsteinsson** – **Excelsior** – 2026–
- Arnar Viðarsson – Twente, De Graafschap – 2005–08
- **Brynjólfur Willumsson** – **Groningen** – 2024–
- **Willum Þór Willumsson** – Go Ahead Eagles, **NEC** – 2022–24, 2025–

== Indonesia ==
- Irfan Bachdim – Utrecht – 2007–08
- Jhon van Beukering – Vitesse, PEC Zwolle, De Graafschap, NEC, Feyenoord – 2000–05, 2007–09, 2010–11
- Kevin Diks – Vitesse – 2014–17
- Thom Haye – AZ, Willem II, ADO Den Haag, Heerenveen, Almere City – 2013–18, 2019–20, 2021–25
- **Mees Hilgers** – Twente, **Heerenveen** – 2020–25, 2026–
- **Justin Hubner** – **Fortuna Sittard** – 2025–
- Jay Idzes – Go Ahead Eagles – 2021–23
- **Dean James** – Volendam, **Go Ahead Eagles** – 2022–
- **Miliano Jonathans** – Vitesse, Utrecht, **Excelsior** – 2021–
- Stefano Lilipaly – Utrecht – 2011–12
- Ragnar Oratmangoen – Go Ahead Eagles, Groningen, Fortuna Sittard – 2021–24
- **Maarten Paes** – Utrecht, **Ajax** – 2018–22, 2025–
- Joey Pelupessy – Twente, Heracles Almelo, Groningen – 2012–13, 2014–18, 2022–23, 2024–25
- Eliano Reijnders – PEC Zwolle – 2020–22, 2023–26
- **Ole Romeny** – Willem II, NEC, Emmen, Utrecht, **Fortuna Sittard** 2020–25, 2026–
- **Nathan Tjoe-A-On** – Excelsior, Heerenveen, **Willem II** – 2022–24, 2026–
- Calvin Verdonk – Feyenoord, PEC Zwolle, Twente, NEC – 2014–17, 2019–20, 2021–26

== Iran ==
- Dennis Eckert – Excelsior – 2018–19
- Saeid Janfada – VVV-Venlo – 1990–94
- Reza Ghoochannejhad – Heerenveen, PEC Zwolle – 2005–06, 2008–09, 2016–18, 2019–21
- **Alireza Jahanbakhsh** – NEC, AZ, Feyenoord, Heerenveen, **Excelsior** – 2013–18, 2021–25, 2026–
- Agil Etemadi – De Graafschap – 2018–19

== Iraq ==
- Nashat Akram – Twente – 2009–10
- Hussein Ali – Heerenveen – 2022–25
- **Marko Farji** – **Heerenveen** – 2026–
- Zidane Iqbal – Utrecht – 2023–27
- Ali Jasim – Almere City – 2024–25
- Danilo Al-Saed – Heerenveen – 2024–25
- Aimar Sher – Groningen – 2022–23

== Ireland ==
- Jack Byrne – SC Cambuur – 2015–16
- Mick Byrne – ADO Den Haag – 1987–88
- David Connolly – Feyenoord – 1997–98, 2000–01
- John Delamere – PEC Zwolle – 1981–82
- Peter Fitzgerald – Sparta Rotterdam – 1959–60
- Anselmo García MacNulty – PEC Zwolle – 2023–26
- Ryan Johansson – Fortuna Sittard – 2021–22
- Liam Kelly – Feyenoord – 2019–20
- Paul McGee – Haarlem – 1986–87
- Troy Parrott – Excelsior, AZ Alkmaar – 2023–27
- Frank Stapleton – Ajax – 1987–88

== Israel ==
- **Eli Dasa** – Vitesse, **NEC** – 2019–22, 2025–
- Ilay Elmkies – ADO Den Haag – 2020–21
- **Oscar Gloukh** – **Ajax** – 2025–
- Ariel Harush – Sparta Rotterdam, Heerenveen – 2019–20
- Motti Ivanir – Roda JC – 1986–88
- **Stav Lemkin** – **Twente** – 2025–
- Ohad Levita – RKC Waalwijk – 2009–11
- Ofir Marciano – Feyenoord – 2021–22
- Haim Megrelashvili – Vitesse – 2007–09
- Raz Meir – RKC Waalwijk – 2023–24
- Dan Mori – Vitesse – 2012–14
- Nico Olsak – RKC Waalwijk – 2020–21
- Suf Podgoreanu – Heracles Almelo – 2024–25
- Ben Sahar – De Graafschap – 2008–09, Willem II – 2014–15
- Samuel Scheimann – Excelsior – 2011–12
- Gil Vermouth – De Graafschap – 2011–12
- Sheran Yeini – Vitesse – 2015–17
- Eran Zahavi – PSV – 2020–22

== Italy ==
- Kingsley Boateng – NAC – 2014–15
- **Devid Eugene Bouah** – **Cambuur** – 2026–
- Luca Caldirola – Vitesse – 2010–11
- Gianmarco Cangiano – Fortuna Sittard – 2022–23
- Marco De Marchi – Vitesse – 1997–2000
- Dario Del Fabro – ADO Den Haag – 2020–21
- Lorenzo Lucca – Ajax – 2022–23
- Federico Mattiello – Go Ahead Eagles – 2022–23
- Andrea Mei – VVV-Venlo – 2011–12
- Lorenzo Milani – Heracles Almelo – 2024–25
- Gaetano Oristanio – Volendam – 2022–23
- Graziano Pellè – AZ, Feyenoord – 2007–11, 2012–14
- Giacomo Quagliata – Heracles – 2020–22
- Paolo Ramora – Roda JC – 2000–02
- Stefano Ricci – RBC – 2000–01
- Daniele Rugani – Ajax – 2024–25
- Antonio Satriano – Heracles Almelo – 2023–24, 2025–26
- Gianluca Scamacca – PEC Zwolle – 2018–19
- Alessandro Tripaldelli – PEC Zwolle – 2018–19

== Ivory Coast ==
- **Simon Adingra** – **Ajax** – 2026–
- Wilfried Bony – Vitesse, NEC Nijmegen – 2010–13, 2021–22
- Sekou Cissé – Roda JC, Feyenoord – 2004–09, 2010–14
- Yann Gboho – Vitesse – 2021–22
- Sébastien Haller – Utrecht, Ajax – 2014–17, 2020–22, 2024–26
- Bonaventure Kalou – Feyenoord, Heerenveen – 1997–2003, 2008–10
- Salomon Kalou – Feyenoord – 2003–06
- Wilfried Kanon – ADO Den Haag – 2013–20
- Arouna Koné – Roda JC, PSV – 2003–08
- Chris-Kévin Nadje – Feyenoord, Excelsior – 2024–26
- Ibrahim Sangaré – PSV – 2020–24
- Cheick Tioté – Roda JC, Twente – 2007–11

== Jamaica ==
- Joel Latibeaudiere – Twente – 2019–20
- Greg Leigh – Breda – 2018–19
- Ravel Morrison – ADO Den Haag – 2020–21

== Japan ==
- Robert Cullen – VVV-Venlo – 2011–13
- Ritsu Doan – Groningen, PSV – 2017–20, 2021–22
- Toshiya Fujita – Utrecht – 2003–04
- Mike Havenaar – Vitesse, ADO Den Haag – 2011–14, 2015–17
- Dido Havenaar – ADO Den Haag – 1975–85
- Sōta Hirayama – Heracles – 2005–06
- Keisuke Honda – VVV-Venlo, Vitesse – 2007–08, 2009–10, 2019–20
- **Rion Ichihara** – **AZ** – 2025–
- Ko Itakura – Groningen, Ajax – 2019–21, 2025–26
- Yuki Kobayashi – Heerenveen – 2016–19
- Naoki Maeda – Utrecht – 2022–23
- **Seiya Maikuma** – **AZ** – 2024–
- **Shunsuke Mito** – **Sparta Rotterdam** – 2023–
- Ryo Miyaichi – Feyenoord, Twente – 2010–11, 2014–15
- Tatsuya Mochizuki – HFC Haarlem – 1982–85
- Keito Nakamura – Twente – 2019–20
- Yuta Nakayama – PEC Zwolle – 2019–22
- Koki Ogawa – NEC – 2023–26
- Shinji Ono – Feyenoord – 2001–05
- Kosuke Ota – Vitesse – 2015–17
- Yūki Ōtsu – VVV-Venlo – 2012–13
- Koki Saito – Sparta Rotterdam – 2022–24
- **Kodai Sano** – NEC, **PSV** – 2023–
- Kento Shiogai – NEC – 2024–26
- Yukinari Sugawara – AZ – 2019–24
- Yoshiaki Takagi – Utrecht – 2011–13
- Kazuyuki Toda – ADO Den Haag – 2003–04
- Takehiro Tomiyasu – Ajax – 2025–26
- Ayase Ueda – Feyenoord – 2023–27
- **Tsuyoshi Watanabe** – **Feyenoord** – 2025–
- Sai van Wermeskerken – Dordrecht, PEC Zwolle, SC Cambuur, NEC – 2014–15, 2019–24
- Michihiro Yasuda – Vitesse – 2010–13
- Maya Yoshida – VVV-Venlo – 2010–13

== Kazakhstan ==
- Alexander Merkel – Heracles – 2018–20
- Georgy Zhukov – Roda JC – 2015–16

== Kosovo ==
- Donis Avdijaj – Roda JC, Willem II, Emmen – 2017–19, 2020–21
- Destan Bajselmani – PEC Zwolle – 2019–22
- Sinan Bytyqi – Cambuur, Go Ahead Eagles – 2014–15, 2016–17
- Bersant Celina – Twente – 2016–17
- Toni Domgjoni – Vitesse – 2021–24
- Ibrahim Drešević – Heerenveen – 2018–22
- Erton Fejzullahu – NEC – 2009–12
- Arianit Ferati – Fortuna Sittard – 2021–24
- Arian Kastrati – Fortuna Sittard – 2020-22
- Shkodran Metaj – Groningen, RKC Waalwijk – 2007–11
- Aro Murić – Breda, Willem II – 2018–19, 2020–21
- Milot Rashica – Vitesse – 2015–18
- Lum Rexhepi – Go Ahead Eagles – 2016–17
- Meritan Shabani – VVV-Venlo – 2020–21
- Arber Zeneli – Heerenveen – 2015–19

== Latvia ==
- Ģirts Karlsons – De Graafschap – 2007–08
- **Roberts Uldriķis** – Cambuur, **Heerenveen** – 2021–23, 2026–

== Liberia ==
- Dulee Johnson – De Graafschap – 2011–12
- Mark Pabai – PEC Zwolle – 2021–22
- Dionysius Sebwe – Utrecht – 1997–98
- Christopher Wreh – Den Bosch – 2000–01

== Lithuania ==
- Vytautas Andriuškevičius – Cambuur – 2014–16
- Ernestas Šetkus – ADO Den Haag – 2016–17
- Andrius Skerla – PSV – 1997–2000

== Luxembourg ==
- Yvandro Borges Sanches – NEC, Heracles Almelo – 2023–24, 2025–26
- Laurent Jans – Sparta Rotterdam – 2021–22
- Aurélien Joachim – Willem II, RKC Waalwijk – 2012–14
- Antoine Kohn – Fortuna '54, SC Enschede, Twente – 1959–68
- Enes Mahmutović – NAC Breda – 2024–26
- Marvin Martins – Almere City – 2024–25
- Jean Noel – ADO Den Haag – 1976–77
- Mica Pinto – Fortuna Sittard, Sparta Rotterdam, Vitesse – 2018–24

== Malaysia ==
- Hector Hevel – ADO Den Haag – 2014–17

== Mali ==
- **Yves Bissouma** – **Ajax** – 2026–
- Bakary Diakité – De Graafschap – 2000–02
- **Gaoussou Diarra** – **Feyenoord** – 2025–
- Mahamadou Diarra – Vitesse – 1999–2002
- Nouha Dicko – Vitesse – 2019–20
- Modibo Sagnan – Utrecht – 2022–24
- Moussa Sylla – Utrecht – 2020–23

== Mexico ==
- Edson Álvarez – Ajax – 2019–23
- Uriel Antuna – Groningen – 2017–19
- Stephano Carrillo – Feyenoord – 2024–25
- **Mateo Chávez** – **AZ** – 2025–
- Jesús Corona – Twente – 2013–15
- Ulises Dávila – Vitesse – 2011–12
- Santiago Giménez – Feyenoord – 2022–25
- Andrés Guardado – PSV – 2014–17
- Érick Gutiérrez – PSV – 2018–23
- Hirving Lozano – PSV – 2017–20, 2023–25
- Héctor Moreno – AZ, PSV – 2007–11, 2015–17
- Joaquin del Olmo – Vitesse – 1996–97
- Francisco Javier Rodríguez – PSV – 2008–11
- Carlos Salcido – PSV – 2006–10
- Jorge Sánchez – Ajax – 2022–24

== Moldova ==
- Denis Calincov – Heerenveen, Heracles – 2004–06
- Serghei Cleșcenco – Go Ahead Eagles – 1996–97
- Vitalie Damașcan – Fortuna Sittard, RKC Waalwijk – 2018–21
- Alexei Koșelev – Fortuna Sittard – 2018–21
- Serghei Nani – Go Ahead Eagles – 1995–97
- Ion Nicolaescu – Heerenveen – 2023–25

== Montenegro ==
- Aleksandar Boljević – PSV – 2014–15
- Miodrag Božović – RKC Waalwijk – 1997–98
- Luka Đorđević – Twente – 2013–14
- Igor Gluščević – Utrecht, Vitesse, Heracles – 2000–08
- Dino Islamović – Groningen – 2014–15
- Dragoslav Jevrić – Vitesse – 1999–2005
- **Andrej Kostić** – **Sparta Rotterdam** – 2026–
- Ivica Kralj – PSV Eindhoven – 1999–2002
- Bogdan Milić – ADO Den Haag – 2008–10
- Željko Petrović – Den Bosch, RKC Waalwijk, PSV – 1992–98

== Morocco ==
- Yassine Abdellaoui – Willem II, NAC, NEC – 1992–2003
- Zakaria Aboukhlal – PSV, AZ – 2018–22
- Rochdi Achenteh – PEC Zwolle, Vitesse, Willem II, Go Ahead Eagles – 2012–17
- **Oualid Agougil** – **Utrecht** – 2025–
- Alami Ahannach – MVV – 1997–99
- Ismaïl Aissati – PSV, Twente, Ajax, Vitesse – 2005–12
- Faissal Al Mazyani – RKC Waalwijk – 2024–25
- Taoufik Ameziane – Willem II – 1995–96
- Lofti Amhaouch – Sparta Rotterdam – 1995–96
- Ahmed Ammi – Breda, ADO Den Haag, VVV-Venlo – 2007–13
- **Nordin Amrabat** – VVV-Venlo, PSV, **Utrecht** – 2007–11, 2026–
- **Sofyan Amrabat** – Utrecht, Feyenoord, **Ajax** – 2014–18, 2026–
- Oussama Assaidi – De Graafschap, Heerenveen, Twente – 2008–13, 2016–18
- Yassin Ayoub – Utrecht, Feyenoord, Excelsior – 2012–20, 2022–23
- Ayman Azhil – RKC Waalwijk – 2020–22
- Naoufal Bannis – Feyenoord – 2021–22
- **Ismaël Baouf** – **Cambuur** – 2026–
- Iliass Bel Hassani – Heracles Almelo, AZ, RKC Waalwijk – 2013–20, 2021–23
- Benaissa Benamar – Utrecht, Volendam – 2020–24
- Houssin Bezzai – Sparta Rotterdam – 1999–2002
- **Amir Bouhamdi** – **PSV** – 2026–
- **Sami Bouhoudane** – **Cambuur** – 2026–
- Nourdin Boukhari – Sparta Rotterdam, Ajax, NAC, AZ, RKC Waalwijk – 2000–08, 2011–13
- Ali Boussaboun – Groningen, NAC, Feyenoord, Utrecht, ADO Den Haag – 2001–07, 2008–09, 2010–12
- Ouasim Bouy – PEC Zwolle – 2015–17, 2018–19
- Manuel da Costa – PSV Eindhoven – 2006–08
- Anouar Diba – Breda, Twente – 2000–07, 2009–10
- Aziz Doufikar – PEC Zwolle, Fortuna Sittard – 1984–87, 1990–92
- Couhaib Driouech – Heerenveen, Excelsior, PSV – 2020–21, 2022–26
- Karim El Ahmadi – Twente, Feyenoord – 2003–12, 2014–18
- Youssef El Akchaoui – ADO Den Haag, NEC, Heerenveen, VVV-Venlo, NAC – 2003–13
- **Rafik El Arguioui** – Utrecht, **Cambuur** – 2025–
- Anouar El Azzouzi – PEC Zwolle – 2023–25
- Zakaria El Azzouzi – Twente, Sparta Rotterdam, Excelsior – 2015–18
- Faouzi El Brazi – Twente – 2001–03
- Abdelkrim El Hadrioui – AZ – 1998–2002
- Mounir El Hamdaoui – Excelsior, Willem II, AZ, Ajax, AZ, Twente – 2002–03, 2006–11, 2015–16, 2017–19
- Mohamed El Hankouri – Feyenoord, Willem II, Groningen – 2016–22
- Redouan El Hankouri – Excelsior – 2018–19
- Soufian El Hassnaoui – De Graafschap – 2013–14
- Faysal El Idrissi – Groningen – 2000–02
- Youssef El Kachati – Sparta Rotterdam, NEC – 2019–20, 2025–26
- Souffian El Karouani – NEC, Utrecht – 2021–26
- Ibrahim El Kadiri – Volendam – 2022–24
- Issam El Maach – RKC Waalwijk – 2021–22
- Aschraf El Mahdioui – ADO Den Haag – 2016–17
- Ahmed El Messaoudi – Fortuna Sittard, Groningen, Emmen – 2018–23
- Ali Elkhattabi – Sparta Rotterdam, Heerenveen, AZ, RBC Roosendaal – 1995–06
- **Amine Et-Taïbi** – **Willem II** – 2026–
- Karim Fachtali – NEC, RKC Waalwijk – 2006–08, 2011–12
- Adam Farouk – RBC Roosendaal – 2004–05
- Youssef Fertout – AZ – 1998–2001
- Brahim Ghalidi – NAC – 2025–26
- Abdou Harroui – Sparta Rotterdam – 2017–18, 2019–22
- Oussama Idrissi – Groningen, AZ, Ajax, Feyenoord – 2015–21, 2022–23
- Anouar Kali – Utrecht, Roda JC, Willem II, Utrecht, Breda – 2010–19
- Abdelkarim Kissi – Heerenveen – 2005–06
- Zakaria Labyad – PSV, Vitesse, Utrecht, Ajax – 2009–12, 2013–15, 2016–24
- Mimoun Mahi – Groningen, Utrecht, Cambuur – 2014–19, 2020–23
- Youssef Mariana – Willem II – 2000–04
- Hachim Mastour – PEC Zwolle – 2016–17
- Noussair Mazraoui – Ajax – 2017–22
- Ali Messaoud – AZ, Willem II, NEC, Excelsior – 2012–13, 2014–15, 2016–19
- Mourad Mghizrat – Sparta Rotterdam, Utrecht, Den Bosch, Willem II – 1996–2000, 2001–05
- Youness Mokhtar – PEC Zwolle, Twente, ADO Den Haag – 2012–15, 2016–18, 2020–21
- Imad Najah – RKC Waalwijk – 2012–14
- Mohamed Nassoh – Sparta Rotterdam, NAC – 2024–26
- Imran Nazih – Volendam – 2022–24
- Anas Ouahim – Heracles Almelo – 2021–22, 2023–24
- **Ayoub Ouarghi** – **Feyenoord** – 2025–
- **Abdellah Ouazane** – **Ajax** – 2026–
- Houssein Ouhsaine Ouichou – FC Volendam – 2003–04
- Bilal Ould-Chikh – Feyenoord, Utrecht, ADO Den Haag, Volendam – 2013–15, 2017–18, 2019–21, 2022–24, 2025–26
- Mohamed Oukhattou – PEC Zwolle – 2023–24
- **Yassin Oukili** – Vitesse, RKC Waalwijk, **Fortuna Sittard** – 2019–20, 2021–
- Adil Ramzi – Willem II, PSV, Twente, AZ, Utrecht, Roda JC – 1997–2007, 2011–13
- Youssef Rossi – NEC – 1999–2000
- Akram Roumani – RBC Roosendaal – 2005–06
- Dries Saddiki – Willem II – 2018–22
- Osame Sahraoui – Heerenveen – 2022–24
- Ismael Saibari – PSV – 2020–26
- Anass Salah-Eddine – Ajax, Twente, PSV – 2021–26
- Ilias Sebaoui – Heerenveen – 2024–25
- Tarik Sektioui – Willem II, AZ – 2000–06
- Khalid Sinouh – Heerenveen, RKC Waalwijk, AZ, Utrecht, PSV, NEC – 1997–98, 2000–05, 2006–07, 2009–13
- **Younes Taha** – **Twente**, Groningen – 2023–
- Anas Tahiri – RKC Waalwijk, SC Heerenveen, Almere City – 2019–25
- Mohammed Tahiri – Sparta Rotterdam – 2022–23
- Oussama Tannane – Heerenveen, Heracles, Utrecht, Vitesse, NEC – 2012–16, 2018–23
- **Oussama Targhalline** – **Feyenoord** – 2024–
- Adnane Tighadouini – Vitesse, NAC, Twente – 2010–12, 2013–15, 2016–18
- Tarik Tissoudali – VVV-Venlo – 2017–18
- Chakib Zbayri – RKC Waalwijk – 2003–04
- Hakim Ziyech – Heerenveen, Twente, Ajax – 2012–20

== New Zealand ==
- Matthew Garbett – NAC Breda – 2024–25
- Alan Johnstone – Utrecht – 1989–90
- Fred de Jong – Fortuna Sittard – 1990–93
- James McGarry – Willem II – 2018–20
- Marco Rojas – Heerenveen – 2017–19
- **Ryan Thomas** – **PEC Zwolle**, PSV – 2013–18, 2019–22, 2023–
- Ivan Vicelich – Roda JC, RKC Waalwijk – 2000–07
- Michael Woud – Willem II – 2018–20

== Nigeria ==
- Dele Adeleye – Sparta Rotterdam – 2006–10
- Alloysius Agu – MVV – 1990–92
- Abdul Jeleel Ajagun – Roda JC – 2016–17
- Ajah Ogechukwu – Roda JC – 1990–95
- Oluwafemi Ajilore – Groningen – 2008–11, 2012–13
- Hamdi Akujobi – Heerenveen – 2019–22
- **Tolu Arokodare** – **Ajax** – 2026–
- Taiwo Awoniyi – NEC – 2016–17
- Haruna Babangida – Vitesse – 2010–11
- Ibrahim Babangida – FC Volendam – 1997–98
- Tijani Babangida – VVV-Venlo, Roda JC, Ajax, Vitesse – 1991–92, 1993–2000, 2001–02
- Abubakar Balarabe – MVV – 1994–95
- Calvin Bassey – Ajax – 2022–23
- Charles Chiemezie – RKC Waalwijk – 1997–99
- Abiola Dauda – Vitesse – 2014–17
- Cyriel Dessers – Utrecht, Heracles, Feyenoord – 2017–20, 2021–22
- Emmanuel Ebiede – Heerenveen – 1997–99
- Tyronne Ebuehi – ADO Den Haag, Twente – 2014–18, 2020–21
- Kingsley Ehizibue – PEC Zwolle – 2014–19
- Chidera Ejuke – Heerenveen – 2019–20
- Alex Emenike – VVV-Venlo – 2009–12
- Fred Friday – AZ, Sparta Rotterdam – 2016–18
- Finidi George – Ajax – 1993–96
- Hilary Gong – Vitesse – 2018–22
- Pius Ikedia – Ajax, Groningen, RBC Roosendaal, AZ, RKC Waalwijk – 1997–2007
- Benedict Iroha – Vitesse – 1992–96
- Sani Kaita – Sparta Rotterdam – 2005–08
- Christopher Kanu – Ajax – 1999–2001
- Nwankwo Kanu – Ajax – 1993–2006
- Garba Lawal – Roda JC – 1996–2002
- Ahmed Musa – VVV-Venlo – 2010–12
- Kelechi Nwakali – VVV-Venlo – 2017–18
- Emmanuel Nwakire – Utrecht, RKC Waalwijk – 1997–2003
- Godfrey Nwankpa – Heerenveen – 1998–2001
- Chidi Nwanu – RKC Waalwijk – 1996–98
- Uche Nwofor – VVV-Venlo, Heerenveen – 2011–14
- Kingsley Obiekwu – Go Ahead Eagles – 1995–98
- Mike Obiku – Feyenoord, AZ – 1992–96, 1998–99
- Bartholomew Ogbeche – Cambuur, Willem II – 2013–18
- Maduka Okoye – Sparta Rotterdam – 2020–22
- Michael Olaitan – Twente – 2015–16
- Azubuike Oliseh – Utrecht, RBC Roosendaal – 1999–2005
- Sunday Oliseh – Ajax – 1997–99
- Kenneth Omeruo – ADO Den Haag – 2011–13
- Henry Onwuzuruike – Heerenveen – 1997–99
- John Owoeri – Feyenoord – 2005–06
- Peter Rufai – Go Ahead Eagles – 1993–94
- Wasiu Taiwo – De Graafschap, MVV – 1996–2000
- Ode Thompson – RBC Roosendaal – 2003–04
- William Troost-Ekong – Groningen, FC Dordrecht – 2013–15
- Michael Uchebo – VVV-Venlo – 2009–11
- Robin Udegbe – VVV-Venlo – 2011–12
- Albert Yobo – FC Zwolle – 2003–04

== North Macedonia ==
- Xhelil Abdulla – De Graafschap – 2011–12
- Aleksandar Damčevski – NAC – 2014–15
- Milko Đurovski – Groningen, Cambuur – 1990–94
- Samir Fazli – Heerenveen – 2009–14
- Nikola Gjorgjev – Twente – 2017–18
- Georgi Hristov – NEC, PEC Zwolle – 2000–04
- Mile Krstev – Heerenveen, Groningen – 1998–2005
- Denis Mahmudov – PEC Zwolle – 2013–15
- Goran Popov – Heerenveen – 2008–10
- Dževdet Šainovski – NEC – 1997–99
- Aleksandar Stankov – Roda JC – 2009–12
- Hristijan Denkovski – Groningen – 2014–15

== Northern Ireland ==
- Johnny Crossan – Sparta Rotterdam – 1959–61
- Phil Gray – Fortuna Sittard – 1996–97
- Sammy Morgan – Sparta Rotterdam – 1978–79
- James Quinn – Willem II – 2002–05

== Norway ==
- Sveinung Aarnseth – VVV-Venlo – 1957–58
- Roger Albertsen – FC Den Haag, Feyenoord – 1975–81
- Fredrik Aursnes – Feyenoord – 2021–23
- Harald Berg – FC Den Haag – 1971–74
- Daniel Berg Hestad – Heerenveen – 2003–05
- André Bergdølmo – Ajax – 2000–03
- Fredrik André Bjørkan – Feyenoord – 2022–23
- Torgeir Børven – Twente – 2013–17
- **Oliver Braude** – **Heerenveen** – 2023–
- **Marius Broholm** – **Utrecht** – 2026–
- Filip Delaveris – Vitesse – 2020–21
- **Oliver Valaker Edvardsen** – Go Ahead Eagles, **Ajax** – 2022–
- Magnus Wolff Eikrem – Heerenveen – 2013–14
- Omar Elabdellaoui – Feyenoord – 2012–13
- Tarik Elyounoussi – Heerenveen – 2008–11
- Runar Espejord – Heerenveen – 2019–20
- Håkon Evjen – AZ – 2019–23
- **Erik Flataker** – **Go Ahead Eagles** – 2026–
- Tor Fuglset – FC Den Haag – 1972–73
- Christian Grindheim – Heerenveen – 2007–11
- Kornelius Hansen – Almere City – 2023–25
- **Isak Hansen-Aarøen** – **NEC** – 2025–
- André Hanssen – Heerenveen – 2004–07
- **Kjetil Haug** – **Go Ahead Eagles** – 2026–
- Markus Henriksen – AZ – 2012–17
- **Travis Hernes** – **Groningen** – 2025–
- Harry Hestad – FC Den Haag – 1970–72
- Thomas Holm – Heerenveen – 1998–2002
- Nikolai Hopland – Heerenveen – 2024–27
- Johan Hove – Groningen – 2022–23, 2024–25
- Abdisalam Ibrahim – NEC – 2011–12
- Fredrik Oldrup Jensen – NAC Breda – 2024–26
- Ruben Yttergård Jenssen – Groningen – 2016–18
- Ulrik Yttergård Jenssen – Willem II – 2021–22
- Bjørn Maars Johnsen – ADO Den Haag, AZ, Cambuur – 2017–19, 2022–23
- Dennis Johnsen – Ajax, Heerenveen, PEC Zwolle – 2017–20
- Pa Modou Kah – Roda JC – 2004–11
- Daniel Karlsbakk – Heerenveen – 2022–25
- Joshua Kitolano – Sparta Rotterdam – 2022–26
- Mathias Kjølø – PSV, Twente – 2020–21, 2022–27
- **Fabian Kvam** – **Cambuur** – 2026–
- Lars Olden Larsen – NEC – 2023–25
- Tobias Lauritsen – Sparta Rotterdam – 2022–26
- Isak Dybvik Määttä – Groningen – 2022–23
- Sivert Mannsverk – Ajax – 2023–25
- Børre Meinseth – Heerenveen – 1996–98
- Elias Hoff Melkersen – Sparta Rotterdam – 2022–23
- Fredrik Midtsjø – AZ – 2017–22
- Erik Mykland – Utrecht – 1994–95
- Nicolai Næss – Heerenveen – 2017–19
- Erik Nevland – Groningen – 2004–08
- Lasse Nordås – Heerenveen – 2025–26
- Kenneth Nysæther – Fortuna Sittard – 1992–93
- Martin Ødegaard – Heerenveen, Vitesse – 2016–19
- Fredrik Oppegård – PSV, Go Ahead Eagles, Heracles Almelo – 2020–25
- **Sondre Ørjasæter** – **Twente** – 2025–
- Marcus Pedersen – Vitesse – 2010–12, 2013–14
- Marcus Holmgren Pedersen – Feyenoord – 2021–23, 2024–25
- **Alwande Roaldsøy** – **Sparta Rotterdam** – 2025–
- Vajebah Sakor – Willem II – 2016–17
- Alfons Sampsted – Twente – 2022–24
- Martin Samuelsen – VVV-Venlo – 2018–19
- Finn Seemann – DWS, Utrecht – 1968–73
- Harmeet Singh – Feyenoord – 2012–13
- **Oskar Sivertsen** – **Go Ahead Eagles** – 2024–
- Alexander Sørloth – Groningen – 2015–17
- Tom Kåre Staurvik – Breda – 1996–97
- Erik Stock – NEC – 1990–94
- Jørgen Strand Larsen – Groningen – 2020–23
- Jonas Svensson – AZ – 2016–21
- Hallvar Thoresen – Twente, PSV – 1976–88
- Morten Thorsby – Heerenveen – 2014–19
- **Filip Thorvaldsen** – **Twente** – 2026–
- Sondre Tronstad – Vitesse – 2019–23
- Aslak Fonn Witry – AZ – 2021–23
- David Møller Wolfe – AZ – 2023–25
- Rafik Zekhnini – Twente – 2019–20

== Pakistan ==
- Easah Suliman – Emmen – 2018–19

== Paraguay ==
- Édgar Barreto – NEC – 2003–07, 2021–22
- Roberto Junior Fernández – Utrecht – 2011–12
- Celso Ortiz – AZ – 2009–15

== Palestine ==
- Adam Kaied – NAC Breda – 2024–25

== Peru ==
- Miguel Araujo – Emmen – 2019–21, 2022–23
- Jefferson Farfán – PSV – 2004–08
- Didier La Torre – Emmen – 2020–21
- Marcos López – Feyenoord – 2022–25
- Reimond Manco – PSV, Willem II – 2008–09
- Fernando Pacheco – Emmen – 2022–23
- Sergio Peña – Emmen – 2019–21
- Renato Tapia – Twente, Feyenoord, Willem II – 2014–20

== Philippines ==
- Paul Mulders – ADO Den Haag, Cambuur – 2011–12, 2013–14

== Poland ==
- **Filip Bednarek** – Utrecht, Heerenveen, **Sparta Rotterdam** – 2015–16, 2019–20, 2026–
- Bartosz Białek – Vitesse – 2022–23
- Daniel Bielica – NAC Breda – 2024–26
- Paweł Bochniewicz – Heerenveen – 2020–26
- Krzysztof Bociek – FC Volendam, AZ, NEC, Den Bosch – 1995–2000
- Henryk Bolesta – Feyenoord, Roda JC – 1989–93
- Jerzy Dudek – Feyenoord – 1996–01
- **Jan Faberski** – **PEC Zwolle** – 2025–
- Kazimierz Frankiewicz – NAC – 1968–71
- Wojciech Golla – NEC – 2015–18
- Tomasz Iwan – Roda JC, Feyenoord, PSV, RBC Roosendaal – 1994–2001
- Jarosław Jach – Fortuna Sittard – 2020–21
- Michał Janota – Feyenoord – 2008–10
- Arkadiusz Kaliszan – Roda JC – 1993–94
- Piotr Kasperski – Roda JC – 1995–97
- Paweł Kieszek – Roda JC – 2011–12
- Wisław Kitzmann – Breda – 1968–72
- Aleksander Kłak – De Graafschap – 2003–05
- Mateusz Klich – PEC Zwolle, Twente, Utrecht – 2012–14, 2016–18
- Kacper Kostorz – NAC Breda – 2024–25
- Janusz Kowalik – Sparta Rotterdam, NEC, MVV – 1969–74, 1975–76, 1978–79
- Kacper Kozłowski – Vitesse – 2022–24
- Mariusz Kukiełka – Roda JC – 1997–98
- **Krzysztof Kurowski** – **Twente** – 2026–
- Filip Kurto – Roda JC, Dordrecht, Excelsior – 2012–16
- Mikołaj Lebedyński – Roda JC – 2011–13
- Jan Liberda – AZ – 1969–71
- Zbigniew Małkowski – Excelsior, Feyenoord – 2002–03, 2004–05
- Aleksander Mandziara – Breda – 1971–72
- Radosław Matusiak – Heerenveen – 2007–08
- Arkadiusz Milik – Ajax – 2014–16
- **Jakub Moder** – **Feyenoord** – 2024–
- Piotr Modrzejewski – HFC Haarlem – 1986–87
- Jerzy Musiałek – Breda – 1972–73
- Andrzej Niedzielan – Nijmegen – 2003–07
- Karol Niemczycki – Breda – 2017–19
- Bartłomiej Pacuszka – Heracles – 2008–09
- Piotr Parzyszek – De Graafschap – 2015–16
- Norbert Pogrzeba – Breda – 1968–72
- Mateusz Prus – Roda JC – 2010–13
- Arkadiusz Radomski – Heerenveen, NEC – 1997–2005, 2008–10
- **Michał Rosiak** – **Twente** – 2026–
- Andrzej Rudy – Ajax – 1997–98
- Tomasz Rząsa – De Graafschap, Feyenoord, Heerenveen, ADO Den Haag – 1997–2003, 2004–06
- Jerzy Sadek – Sparta Rotterdam, Haarlem – 1972–75
- Marek Saganowski – Feyenoord – 1996–97
- Joachim Siwek – Breda – 1979–80
- Ebi Smolarek – Feyenoord, ADO Den Haag – 2000–02, 2003–05, 2011–12
- Włodzimierz Smolarek – Feyenoord, Utrecht – 1988–96
- Sebastian Steblecki – SC Cambuur – 2014–16
- Stefan Szefer – MVV – 1969–71
- Zygmund Szmidt – AZ – 1970–71
- Sebastian Szymański – Feyenoord – 2022–23
- **Przemysław Tytoń** – Roda JC, PSV, **Twente** – 2007–08, 2009–14, 2022–
- Jerzy Wilim – Telstar – 1972–73
- Szymon Włodarczyk – Excelsior – 2025–26
- Paweł Wojciechowski – Heerenveen, Willem II – 2008–11
- **Oskar Zawada** – Twente, RKC Waalwijk, **Groningen** – 2015–16, 2024–

== Portugal ==
- Asumah Abubakar – Willem II – 2015–17
- Mauro Almeida – FC Zwolle – 2003–04
- Bruno Basto – Feyenoord – 2004–05
- **Gonçalo Borges** – **Feyenoord** – 2025–
- **Gabriel Brás** – **NEC** – 2026–
- Bruma – PSV – 2019–22
- Joel Castro Pereira – RKC Waalwijk – 2021–23
- Jorge Chula – VVV-Venlo – 2010–11
- Francisco Conceição – Ajax – 2022–23
- Dani – Ajax – 1996–2000
- Tiago Dantas – AZ – 2023–24
- Eduardo – Vitesse – 2018–19
- Wilson Eduardo – ADO Den Haag – 2014–15
- Úmaro Embaló – Fortuna Sittard – 2022–23, 2024–25
- Saná Fernandes – NAC Breda – 2024–25
- Walter Ferreira – FC Volendam – 1971–72
- Ferro – Vitesse – 2022–23
- Carlos Forbs – Ajax – 2023–25
- Edgar Marcelino – RBC Roosendaal – 2005–06
- Pedro Marques – NEC – 2022–24
- **Rui Mendes** – Emmen, Groningen, **Telstar** – 2022–23, 2024–
- David Nascimento – RKC Waalwijk, Roda JC, Utrecht, RKC Waalwijk, RBC Roosendaal – 1991–2003
- **Guilherme Peixoto** – **Twente** – 2025–
- **Alexandre Penetra** – **AZ** – 2023–
- Danilo Pereira – Roda JC – 2012–13
- Josué – VVV-Venlo – 2010–11
- **Ivo Pinto** – **Fortuna Sittard** – 2021–
- Vivaldo Semedo – Volendam – 2023–24
- Edson Silva – PSV, ADO Den Haag – 2003–05
- Fábio Silva – PSV – 2022–23
- Ricardo Sousa – De Graafschap – 2004–05
- João Carlos Teixeira – Feyenoord – 2020–22
- Bernardo Vasconcelos – RKC Waalwijk – 2003–05
- Diogo Viana – VVV-Venlo – 2009–11
- André Vidigal – Fortuna Sittard – 2018–19
- João Virgínia – Cambuur – 2022–23
- Abel Xavier – PSV – 1997–98

== Romania ==
- Tudor Băluță – ADO Den Haag – 2019–20
- Alin Bănceu – Fortuna Sittard – 1997–99
- Andreas Calcan – Willem II – 2016–18
- Rodion Cămătaru – Heerenveen – 1990–91
- Cristian Chivu – Ajax – 1999–2003
- Florin Constantinovici – Heerenveen – 1997–99
- Marian Damaschin – Feyenoord – 1991–92
- Mugur Gușatu – Heerenveen – 1997–99
- Lucian Ilie – Groningen – 1992–93
- Bogdan Lobonț – Ajax – 2000–05
- **Dennis Man** – **PSV** – 2025–
- Răzvan Marin – Ajax – 2019–20
- Cosmin Mariș – Fortuna Sittard – 1997–98, 1999–2001
- Adrian Mazilu – Vitesse – 2023–24
- Nicolae Mitea – Ajax – 2003–07
- Dumitru Mitriță – Heerenveen – 1997–2000
- Ștefan Nanu – Vitesse – 1999–2002
- Mihai Neșu – Utrecht – 2008–11
- George Ogăraru – Ajax – 2006–08
- Gheorghe Popescu – PSV – 1990–94
- Andrei Rațiu – ADO Den Haag – 2020–21
- Mihai Roman – NEC – 2015–16
- Dorin Rotariu – AZ – 2018–19
- Ioan Sabău – Feyenoord – 1990–92
- Lucian Sânmărtean – Utrecht – 2006–09
- Ovidiu Stîngă – PSV – 1996–2001
- Cătălin Țîră – ADO Den Haag – 2013–14
- Dorel Zegrean – Fortuna Sittard – 1997–2000

== Russia ==
- Ari – AZ – 2007–10
- Ansar Ayupov – Twente – 1998–99
- Dmitri Bulykin – ADO Den Haag, Ajax, Twente – 2010–13
- Andrei Demchenko – Ajax – 1997–98
- Anatoli Gerk – Twente – 2006–07
- Vyacheslav Karavayev – Vitesse – 2017–20
- Dmitri Khokhlov – PSV – 1997–2000
- Denis Klyuyev – Feyenoord – 1994–96
- Erik Korchagin – MVV – 1998–2000
- Igor Korneev – Heerenveen, Feyenoord, NAC – 1995–2003
- Arshak Koryan – Vitesse – 2016–17
- Sergei Krutov – Vitesse – 1991–92
- Valeri Masalitin – Vitesse – 1989–90
- Yuriy Nikiforov – PSV, RKC Waalwijk – 1998–2003
- Yuri Petrov – RKC Waalwijk, Twente – 1994–2003
- Valeri Popovitch – Heerenveen – 1999–2000
- Dmitri Shoukov – Vitesse, NAC, Willem II, Twente – 1995–2007
- Fyodor Smolov – Feyenoord – 2010–11
- Sergei Temryukov – PSV – 1997–98

== Rwanda ==
- Fritz Emeran – Fortuna Sittard – 2000–02

== Saudi Arabia ==
- Fahad Al-Ghesheyan – AZ – 1998–99
- Mukhtar Ali – Vitesse – 2016–19

== Scotland ==
- Kenny Anderson – RKC Waalwijk – 2012–14
- David Bielkus – SC Telstar – 1966–68
- Scott Booth – Utrecht, Vitesse, Twente – 1998–2003
- Jimmy Calderwood – Sparta Rotterdam, Willem II, Roda JC – 1979–87
- Scott Calderwood – Willem II – 1996–97
- John Clayton – Fortuna Sittard, FC Volendam – 1988–92
- Colin Cramb – Fortuna Sittard – 2001–03
- Ally Dick – Ajax – 1986–88
- Darren Ferguson – Sparta Rotterdam – 1999
- Robert Gray – MVV – 1972–75
- Mel Holden – PEC Zwolle – 1978–79
- Joe Jakub – AZ – 1986–88
- George Johnston – Feyenoord – 2020-21
- Paul Kerlin – De Graafschap, Go Ahead Eagles – 1976–79
- Andy MacLeod – Fortuna Sittard – 1990–91
- Rob McKinnon – Twente – 1996–98
- Dennis Milne – Heracles – 1965–66
- Frank Ross – Go Ahead Eagles – 2021–22
- Jamie Smith – ADO Den Haag – 2004–05
- Phil Tinney – Heracles – 1965–66

== Senegal ==
- Amadou Ciss – Fortuna Sittard – 2018–20
- Noah Fadiga – Heracles Almelo – 2020–22
- Lamine Sané – Utrecht – 2019–20
- Mickaël Tavares – RKC Waalwijk – 2013–14
- Ibrahima Touré – FC Dordrecht – 2014–15

== Serbia ==
- Luka Adžić – Emmen, PEC Zwolle – 2019–22
- Nikolas Agrafiotis – Excelsior – 2022–24
- Stefan Babović – Feyenoord – 2009–10
- Kristijan Belić – AZ – 2023–25
- Nenad Bjeković – Fortuna Sittard – 2000–01
- Aleksandar Bjelica – Utrecht, PEC Zwolle, ADO Den Haag – 2013–15, 2019–20
- Rade Bogdanović – Breda – 1997–98
- Rajko Brežančić – AZ – 2015–16
- Goran Bunjevčević – ADO Den Haag – 2006–07
- Sava-Arangel Čestić – Heracles Almelo – 2023–24, 2025–26
- Dejan Čurović – Vitesse, Groningen – 1994–2003
- Uroš Đurđević – Vitesse – 2013–15
- Igor Đurić – Heerenveen – 2009–11
- Filip Đuričić – Heerenveen – 2009–13
- Dejan Govedarica – Volendam, RKC Waalwijk, NEC – 1995–2004
- Nenad Grozdić – Vitesse – 1999–2000
- Spira Grujić – Twente, ADO Den Haag – 1998–2006
- Nemanja Gudelj – NAC, AZ, Ajax – 2010–17
- Aleksandar Ilić – Vitesse – 2003–04
- Luka Ilić – NAC, Twente – 2018–19, 2020–21
- Marko Kerkez – Fortuna Sittard – 2025–26
- Mateja Kežman – PSV – 2000–04
- **Filip Kostić** – Groningen, **PSV** – 2012–14, 2026–
- Vladan Kujović – Roda JC, Willem II – 2002–07, 2010–11
- Marko Lazetić – Fortuna Sittard – 2023–24
- Danko Lazović – Feyenoord, Vitesse, PSV – 2003–05, 2006–10
- Goran Lovre – Groningen – 2006–10
- Milos Luković – Heerenveen – 2024–25
- Nemanja Matić – Vitesse – 2010–11
- Uroš Matić – NAC – 2013–15
- Dejan Meleg – Cambuur – 2014–15
- Nemanja Mihajlović – Heerenveen – 2017–19
- Mateja Milovanović – Heerenveen – 2024–25
- Stefan Mitrović – Excelsior – 2025–26
- Mitar Mrkela – Twente, Cambuur – 1990–92, 1993–94
- Srđan Obradović – Utrecht – 1996–98
- Marko Pantelić – Ajax – 2009–10
- Danilo Pantić – Vitesse, Excelsior – 2015–17
- Marko Perović – Vitesse – 1997–98
- Miodrag Pivaš – Willem II – 2024–25
- Bojan Radulović – Fortuna Sittard – 2024–25
- Slobodan Rajković – PSV, Twente, Vitesse – 2007–11
- Aleksandar Ranković – Vitesse, ADO Den Haag – 2002–07, 2008–10
- Radoslav Samardžić – FC Volendam, Heerenveen, Feyenoord, RKC Waalwijk – 1995–2001, 2002–03
- Uroš Spajić – Feyenoord – 2020–21
- Nenad Srećković – De Graafschap – 2011–12
- Filip Stanković – Volendam – 2022–23
- Dejan Stefanović – Vitesse – 2000–03
- Filip Stevanović – Heerenveen, Waalwijk – 2021–22, 2023–24
- Vladimir Stojković – Vitesse – 2006–07
- Miralem Sulejmani – Heerenveen, Ajax – 2007–13
- **Dušan Tadić** – Groningen, Twente, Ajax, **NEC** – 2010–14, 2018–23, 2026–
- Slobodan Tedić – PEC Zwolle – 2020–22
- Ivica Vukov – FC Volendam – 1993–98
- Jagoš Vuković – PSV, Roda JC – 2009–12
- Zoran Zoran – Den Bosch – 1992–93
- Miloš Zukanović – Breda – 2014–15

== Sierra Leone ==
- Alex Bangura – Cambuur – 2021–23
- Sullay Kaikai – NAC – 2018–19
- Issa Kallon – Utrecht, Cambuur – 2014–16, 2021–22
- Ibrahim Kargbo – Willem II – 2006–10
- Paul Kpaka – RBC Roosendaal – 2005–06
- Gibril Sankoh – Groningen, Roda JC – 2004–10, 2015–16

== Singapore ==
- Fandi Ahmad – Groningen – 1983–85

== Slovakia ==
- Matúš Bero – Vitesse – 2018–23
- Róbert Boženík – Feyenoord – 2019–22
- **Nikolas Brandis** – **Groningen** – 2026–
- Igor Demo – PSV – 1997–98
- Stanislav Griga – Feyenoord – 1990–92
- Dávid Hancko – Feyenoord – 2022–25
- Csaba Horváth – ADO Den Haag – 2008–10
- Martin Koscelník – NAC – 2024–25
- František Kubík – ADO Den Haag – 2010–11
- Milan Lalkovič – ADO Den Haag – 2011–12
- Filip Lukšík – ADO Den Haag – 2011–13
- Ivan Mesík – Heracles Almelo – 2024–26
- Rastislav Mores – Roda JC, Nijmegen – 1995–98
- Ivan Mráz – MVV – 1969–72
- Adam Nemec – Willem II – 2015–16
- Branislav Niňaj – Fortuna Sittard – 2018–21
- Ludovit Reis – Groningen – 2017–19
- Andrej Rendla – Twente, Heracles – 2007–12
- Albert Rusnák – Cambuur, Groningen – 2014–17
- Leo Sauer – Feyenoord, NAC – 2023–26
- Samuel Štefánik – NEC – 2013–14
- Miroslav Stoch – Twente – 2009–10
- Tomáš Suslov – Groningen – 2019–24
- Marián Zeman – Vitesse – 1997–2003

== Slovenia ==
- Denis Halilović – Willem II – 2010–11
- Dragan Jelić – Willem II – 2010–11
- Andraž Kirm – Groningen – 2012–14
- Tim Matavž – Groningen, PSV, Vitesse – 2007–14, 2017–20
- Martin Milec – Roda JC – 2015–17
- Mitja Mörec – ADO Den Haag – 2011–12
- Aleksandar Radosavljević – ADO Den Haag, VVV – 2010–13
- Aleksander Šeliga – Sparta Rotterdam – 2009–10
- Dalibor Stevanovič – Vitesse – 2008–11
- **Lovro Štubljar** – **Groningen** – 2026–
- Dejan Trajkovski – Twente – 2016–18
- Etien Velikonja – Willem II – 2017–18
- Dalibor Volaš – Sparta Rotterdam – 2017–18
- Haris Vučkić – Twente – 2017–18
- Luka Zahović – Heerenveen – 2015–16

== South Africa ==
- Stanton Lewis – Ajax – 2007–09
- Kermit Erasmus – Feyenoord – 2008–09
- Luke Le Roux – Volendam – 2023–24
- Benni McCarthy – Ajax – 1997–99
- Aaron Mokoena – Ajax – 1999–2000
- Kamohelo Mokotjo – Feyenoord, PEC Zwolle, Twente – 2010–17
- Bernard Parker – Twente – 2009–11
- Steven Pienaar – Ajax – 2001–06
- Neill Roberts – FC Amsterdam – 1976–77
- Glen Salmon – Breda, Groningen, Breda – 2000–07
- Thulani Serero – Ajax, Vitesse – 2011–19
- Hans Vonk – RKC Waalwijk, Den Bosch, Heerenveen, Ajax – 1988–90, 1992–2006, 2008–09
- Geoff Wegerle – Feyenoord – 1975–76
- Steve Wegerle – Feyenoord – 1975–76

== South Korea ==
- Huh Jung-moo – PSV – 1980–83
- Hwang In-beom – Feyenoord – 2024–26
- Kim Nam-il – Excelsior – 2002–03
- Lee Chun-soo – Feyenoord – 2007–08
- Lee Young-pyo – PSV – 2003–05
- Noh Jung-yoon – NAC – 1997–99
- Park Ji-sung – PSV – 2003–05, 2013–14
- Song Chong-gug – Feyenoord – 2002–05
- Suk Hyun-jun – Ajax, Groningen – 2009–10, 2011–13
- Yoon Do-young – Excelsior – 2025–26

== Spain ==
- **Ángel Alarcón** – **Utrecht** – 2025–
- Pedro Alemañ – Sparta Rotterdam – 2022–23
- Angeliño – Breda, PSV – 2017–19
- Bojan – Ajax – 2013–14
- Hugo Bueno – Feyenoord – 2024–25
- Oriol Busquets – Twente – 2019–20
- Iván Calero – Sparta Rotterdam – 2016–17
- Aitor Cantalapiedra – Twente – 2019–20
- Álex Carbonell – Fortuna Sittard, Almere City – 2019–20, 2024–25
- Marc Cardona – Go Ahead Eagles – 2021–22
- José María Cela – RKC Waalwijk – 1997–99
- Pedro Chirivella – Go Ahead Eagles – 2016–18
- Iñigo Córdoba – Go Ahead Eagles, Fortuna Sittard – 2021–24
- Isaac Cuenca – Ajax – 2012–13
- Adrián Dalmau – Heracles, Utrecht, Sparta Rotterdam – 2018–22
- **Mario Domínguez** – **Excelsior** – 2026–
- Javier Espinosa – Twente – 2019–20
- Paolo Fernandes – Breda – 2017–19
- Dani Fernández – NEC, Feyenoord – 2007–10, 2011–12
- **Nacho Ferri** – **Feyenoord** – 2026–
- José Fontán – Go Ahead Eagles – 2022–23
- José Fortes Rodríguez – AZ, RBC Roosendaal – 1995–2006
- Gabri – Ajax – 2006–10
- Manu García – Breda – 2017–18
- **Yarek Gasiorowski** – **PSV** – 2025–
- Gonzalo – Heerenveen, Heracles, Groningen, VVV – 2006–11, 2015–16
- Marcos Gullón – Roda JC – 2015–17
- Juanfran – Ajax – 2005–06
- Miguel Ángel Leal – Groningen – 2020–21
- Pol Llonch – Willem II – 2018–22
- Julen Lobete – RKC Waalwijk – 2022–23
- **Javi López** – **Feyenoord** – 2026–
- Jordi López – Vitesse – 2010–11
- Albert Luque – Ajax – 2007–08
- Pablo Marí – Breda – 2017–18
- **Mika Mármol** – **Feyenoord** – 2026–
- **Iván Márquez** – NEC, **Fortuna Sittard** – 2021–23, 2024–
- Matos – Twente – 2019–20
- Raúl Moro – Ajax – 2025–26
- Ximo Navarro – Fortuna Sittard – 2022–23
- Pablo Niño – RBC Roosendaal – 2003–04
- Hugo Novoa – Utrecht – 2023–24
- Julio Pleguezuelo – Twente – 2019–23
- Oleguer – Ajax – 2008–11
- Pascu – ADO Den Haag, Almere City – 2020–21, 2023–24
- Álvaro Peña – Almere City – 2023–24
- Lucas Pérez – PSV – 2024–25
- **Alejandro Pozo** – **ADO Den Haag** – 2026–
- Fernando Quesada – Utrecht – 2013–14
- Jesús Reglero – Utrecht – 1977–78
- Martí Riverola – Vitesse – 2010–11
- Rober – NEC – 2023–26
- José Rodríguez – Fortuna Sittard – 2018–19
- Miguel Rodríguez – Utrecht – 2024–26
- Roger – Ajax – 2006–07
- Sergi Rosanas – Sparta Rotterdam – 2023–24
- Manel Royo – Almere City, NAC – 2023–25
- Pedro Ruiz – NEC – 2021–22
- Alberto Saavedra – ADO Den Haag – 2003–07
- Sergio Sánchez – ADO Den Haag – 2006–07
- Nico Serrano – PEC Zwolle – 2023–24
- Manuel Sánchez Torres – Twente, Roda JC, NEC Nijmegen – 1978–85, 1987–91
- Darío Serra – Go Ahead Eagles – 2022–23
- Fran Sol – Willem II – 2016–19
- **Jofre Torrents** – **Ajax** – 2026–
- Ismael Urzaiz – Ajax – 2007–08
- Enric Vallès – Breda – 2008–10
- José María Vidal – Sparta Rotterdam – 1966–67
- Ricardo Visus – Almere City – 2024–25

== Suriname ==
- Myenty Abena – De Graafschap – 2018–19
- Roland Alberg – Excelsior, ADO Den Haag – 2011–12, 2013–16
- Djavan Anderson – AZ, Cambuur, PEC Zwolle – 2014–16, 2021–22
- Navajo Bakboord – Heracles Almelo – 2019–20, 2021–22, 2023–24
- Sheraldo Becker – PEC Zwolle, ADO Den Haag – 2014–19
- Diego Biseswar – Feyenoord, Heracles, De Graafschap – 2005–12
- Jean-Paul Boëtius – Feyenoord – 2012–15, 2017–19
- Melayro Bogarde – Groningen – 2021–22
- **Tjaronn Chery** – Twente, SC Cambuur, Emmen, ADO Den Haag, Groningen, **NEC** – 2008–15, 2023–24, 2025–
- Denilho Cleonise – Twente, RKC Waalwijk – 2021–25
- Damil Dankerlui – Willem II, Groningen, Almere City – 2017–23, 2024–25
- Ryan Donk – RKC Waalwijk, AZ – 2005–08
- Mitchell Donald – Ajax, Willem II, Roda JC – 2007–08, 2009–10, 2011–14
- Silvinho Esajas – ADO Den Haag, Volendam – 2020–21, 2025–26
- Iwan Fränkel – Blauw-Wit – 1962–64
- Ray Fränkel – Groningen – 2003–04
- Danzell Gravenberch – N.E.C., Sparta Rotterdam – 2013–14, 2021–22
- Siegfried Haltman – AZ – 1968–69
- Warner Hahn – PEC Zwolle, Excelsior, Heerenveen, Go Ahead Eagles – 2014–15, 2016–20, 2021–22
- Ridgeciano Haps – AZ, Feyenoord – 2013–22
- Nigel Hasselbaink – Excelsior – 2015–17
- Florian Jozefzoon – Ajax, NAC Breda, RKC Waalwijk, PSV – 2010–17, 2022–23
- Sean Klaiber – Utrecht, Dordrecht, Ajax – 2013–24
- Leo Kogeldans – VVV-Venlo – 1957–59
- Ryan Koolwijk – Excelsior, NEC, Dordrecht, PEC Zwolle – 2007–08, 2010–15, 2016–19, 2021–22
- Michel Kruin – USV Elinkwijk, DOS – 1956–64
- Djevencio van der Kust – Utrecht, Sparta Rotterdam, Heracles Almelo – 2021–26
- Kelvin Leerdam – Feyenoord, Vitesse, Heracles Almelo – 2008–17, 2023–24
- Ramon Leeuwin – Utrecht, ADO Den Haag, Cambuur, AZ – 2007–08, 2010–21
- Yannick Leliendal – Utrecht, Volendam – 2023–24, 2025–26
- Justin Lonwijk – Utrecht, Fortuna Sittard – 2019–20, 2023–24, 2025–26
- Calvin Mac-Intosh – Cambuur, Fortuna Sittard – 2014–16, 2018–19, 2021–23
- Dion Malone – ADO Den Haag, Telstar – 2012–17, 2018–20, 2025–26
- Charley Marbach – USV Elinkwijk – 1956–61
- **Richonell Margaret** – Vitesse, RKC Waalwijk, **Go Ahead Eagles** – 2018–19, 2023–
- Jahnoah Markelo – Go Ahead Eagles – 2022–23
- Frank Mijnals – USV Elinkwijk, DOS – 1957–64
- Virgil Misidjan – Willem II, PEC Zwolle, Twente, NEC – 2012–13, 2020–23, 2025–26
- Miquel Nelom – Excelsior, Feyenoord, Sparta Rotterdam, Willem II – 2010–18, 2019–22
- **Rojendro Oudsten** – **Telstar** – 2025–
- Immanuel Pherai – PEC Zwolle – 2020–21
- Shaquille Pinas – ADO Den Haag – 2017–21
- Joël Piroe – Sparta Rotterdam, PSV – 2019–21
- Dennis Purperhart – HFC Haarlem, RKC Waalwijk – 1988–91
- Herman Rijkaard – Blauw-Wit – 1957–60
- **Jermaine Rijssel** – **Heerenveen** – 2025–
- Armand Sahadewsing – DWS – 1967–68
- Erwin Sparendam – USV Elinkwijk, Blauw-Wit – 1956–58, 1959–64
- **Shiloh 't Zand** – Heracles Almelo, Feyenoord, **Fortuna Sittard** – 2024–25, 2026–
- **Etienne Vaessen** – RKC Waalwijk, **Groningen** – 2019–20, 2021–
- **Dylan Vente** – Feyenoord, RKC Waalwijk, PEC Zwolle, **Heerenveen** – 2017–21, 2024–
- Roscello Vlijter – SC Telstar – 2019–20
- Mitchell te Vrede – Excelsior, Feyenoord, Heerenveen, NAC Breda – 2011–16, 2017–19

== Sweden ==
- Paulos Abraham – Groningen – 2020–23
- Amin Affane – Roda JC – 2012–13
- Erik Ahlstrand – Heracles Almelo – 2025–26
- Rami Al Hajj – Heerenveen – 2019–23
- Marcus Allbäck – Heerenveen – 2000–02
- Pontus Almqvist – Utrecht – 2021–22
- Petter Andersson – Groningen – 2008–12
- Samuel Armenteros – Heracles, Feyenoord, Willem II – 2009–15, 2016–17
- Joel Asoro – Groningen – 2019–20
- Andreas Augustsson – Twente – 1996–97
- Bo Augustsson – FC Den Haag – 1972–74
- Denni Avdić – PEC Zwolle, AZ, Heracles – 2012–15
- Nabil Bahoui – De Graafschap – 2018–19
- Emir Bajrami – Twente – 2010–13
- Kennedy Bakircioglu – Twente, Ajax – 2005–10
- Abgar Barsom – Heerenveen – 2002–03
- Rasmus Bengtsson – Twente – 2010–15
- Marcus Berg – Groningen, PSV – 2007–09, 2010–11
- Fredrik Berglund – Roda JC – 2001–04
- Emil Bergström – Utrecht, Willem II – 2018–22
- Valmir Berisha – SC Cambuur – 2015–16
- Harry Bild – Feyenoord – 1965–67
- Adam Carlén – Excelsior – 2025–26
- Paweł Cibicki – ADO Den Haag – 2019–20
- **Armin Ćulum** – **Willem II** – 2026–
- Peter Dahlqvist – PSV – 1974–77
- Inge Danielsson – Ajax – 1967–69
- Erik Edman – Heerenveen – 2001–04
- **Victor Edvardsen** – **Go Ahead Eagles** – 2023–
- Ralf Edström – PSV – 1973–77
- Hjalmar Ekdal – Groningen – 2024–25
- Dan Ekner – PSV – 1958–60
- Rasmus Elm – AZ – 2009–12
- Viktor Elm – Heerenveen, AZ – 2008–15
- Johan Elmander – Feyenoord, NAC – 2000–04
- Amar Fatah – Willem II – 2024–25
- **Yaqub Finey** – **Excelsior** – 2026–
- Mathias Florén – Groningen – 2001–06
- Alexander Gerndt – Utrecht – 2011–13
- Andreas Granqvist – Groningen – 2008–11
- Gabriel Gudmundsson – Groningen – 2019–22
- John Guidetti – Feyenoord – 2011–12
- Simon Gustafson – Feyenoord, Roda JC, Utrecht – 2015–22
- Philip Haglund – Heerenveen – 2009–11
- Emil Hansson – Feyenoord, RKC Waalwijk, Fortuna Sittard, Heracles Almelo, Excelsior – 2016–18, 2019–22, 2023–24, 2025–26
- Pär Hansson – Feyenoord – 2016–17
- Petter Hansson – Heerenveen – 2002–07
- Oscar Hiljemark – PSV – 2012–15
- Sebastian Holmén – Willem II – 2019–21
- Glenn Hysén – PSV – 1983–85
- Zlatan Ibrahimović – Ajax – 2001–04
- Patrik Ingelsten – Heerenveen – 2008–10
- Klas Ingesson – PSV – 1993–94
- Daleho Irandust – Groningen – 2021–24
- Alexander Isak – Willem II – 2018–19
- Andreas Isaksson – PSV – 2008–12
- Erik Israelsson – PEC Zwolle – 2016–18
- **Malcolm Jeng** – **Feyenoord** – 2025–
- Alexander Jeremejeff – Twente – 2020–21
- Emil Johansson – Groningen – 2011–13
- Magnus Johansson – Groningen – 1998–2003
- Mattias Johansson – AZ – 2011–17
- Karl-Johan Johnsson – NEC – 2012–14
- Yahya Kalley – Groningen – 2021–23
- **Jesper Karlsson** – AZ, **Utrecht** – 2020–23, 2025–
- Ove Kindvall – Feyenoord – 1966–71
- Bobby Kociski – MVV – 1999–2000
- Gustaf Lagerbielke – Twente – 2024–25
- Mayckel Lahdo – AZ – 2022–25
- Andreas Landgren – Willem II – 2010–11
- Henrik Larsson – Feyenoord – 1993–97
- Jordan Larsson – NEC – 2016–17
- Peter Larsson – Ajax – 1987–91
- Sam Larsson – Heerenveen, Feyenoord – 2014–20
- Isac Lidberg – Go Ahead Eagles, Utrecht – 2021–24
- Rasmus Lindgren – Ajax, Groningen – 2004–11,2012–16
- **Marcus Linday** – **Heerenveen** – 2024–
- Sam Lundholm – NEC – 2015–17
- Ramon Pascal Lundqvist – PSV, Breda, Groningen – 2016–17, 2018–23
- Daniel Majstorović – Twente – 2004–05
- Johan Mårtensson – Utrecht – 2011–14
- Alex Mortensen – Groningen – 2021–22, 2024–25
- Lasse Nilsson – Heerenveen, Vitesse – 2004–07, 2008–11
- Marcus Nilsson – Utrecht – 2011–13
- Torbjörn Nilsson – PSV – 1976–78
- Kristoffer Nordfeldt – Heerenveen – 2011–15
- **Alvin Nordin** – **Groningen** – 2026–
- Björn Nordqvist – PSV – 1972–75
- Jan Nordström – Groningen – 1971–74
- Benjamin Nygren – Heerenveen – 2020–22
- Elias Olsson – Groningen – 2021–22
- Jonas Olsson – NEC – 2005–08
- Simon Olsson – Heerenveen – 2022–25
- Richie Omorowa – Excelsior – 2023–24
- **Jacob Ondrejka** – **Groningen** – 2026–
- Alexander Östlund – Feyenoord – 2004–06
- Mike Owusu – NEC – 2001–03
- **Kristoffer Peterson** – Utrecht, Roda JC, Heracles, **Fortuna Sittard** – 2014–20, 2023–
- Oscar Pettersson – Go Ahead Eagles – 2024–26
- Stefan Pettersson – Ajax – 1988–94
- Mathias Rosén – Groningen – 1995–98
- Markus Rosenberg – Ajax – 2005–07
- Tobias Sana – Ajax – 2012–14
- Amin Sarr – Heerenveen – 2021–23
- Stefan Selaković – Heerenveen – 2001–04
- Isak Ssewankambo – NAC – 2014–15
- Fredrik Stenman – Groningen – 2007–11
- Anders Svensson – PSV – 1959–63
- Max Svensson – Willem II – 2021–22
- Muamer Tanković – AZ – 2014–17
- Simon Thern – Heerenveen – 2014–17
- Simon Tibbling – Groningen, Emmen – 2014–17, 2020–21
- Alex Timossi Andersson – Heerenveen – 2022–23
- Ola Toivonen – PSV – 2008–14
- Sharbel Touma – Twente – 2005–07
- Oscar Uddenäs – Excelsior – 2023–24
- **Elvis van der Laan** – **Groningen** – 2026–
- Joel Voelkerling Persson – Vitesse – 2023–24
- Patrik Wålemark – Feyenoord, Heerenveen – 2022–24
- Pontus Wernbloom – AZ – 2009–12
- **Casper Widell** – **Excelsior** – 2023–24, 2025–

== Switzerland ==
- Anton Allemann – PSV – 1963–64
- Martin Angha – Fortuna Sittard – 2019–22
- Ryan Fosso – Fortuna Sittard – 2024–26
- Roy Gelmi – VVV-Venlo – 2019–21
- Darije Kalezić – RKC Waalwijk, De Graafschap – 1995–2002, 2005–06
- Stephan Keller – RKC Waalwijk, De Graafschap – 2005–09
- Jordan Lotomba – Feyenoord – 2024–27
- Felix Mambimbi – Cambuur – 2022–23
- Raymond Morand – Fortuna '54 – 1958–59
- Yvon Mvogo – PSV – 2020–22
- Blaise Nkufo – Twente – 2003–10
- Jean-Pierre Rhyner – Emmen – 2020–21
- Ricardo Rodríguez – PSV – 2019–20
- Filip Ugrinic – Emmen – 2019–20
- Johann Vogel – PSV – 1999–2005
- Julian Von Moos – Vitesse – 2021–22
- Johan Vonlanthen – PSV, NAC – 2003–06

== Syria ==
- Sanharib Malki – Roda JC – 2011–13
- George Mourad – Willem II – 2007–10
- Mohammed Osman – Vitesse, Heracles Almelo, Sparta Rotterdam – 2015–20, 2021–22

== Thailand ==
- Geoffrey Prommayon – PSV, Willem II – 1990–2001

== Togo ==
- Etienne Amenyido – VVV-Venlo – 2017–18
- Mawouna Amevor – Go Ahead Eagles, Volendam – 2013–15, 2025–26
- Frederic Ananou – Roda JC – 2016–18
- Sadik Fofana – Fortuna Sittard – 2023–24
- Dermane Karim – Feyenoord – 2021–22
- Peniel Mlapa – VVV-Venlo – 2018–19
- Massamasso Tchangai – De Graafschap – 1999–2001

== Trinidad and Tobago ==
- Levi García – AZ, Excelsior – 2015–18
- Déron Payne – Volendam – 2022–24, 2025–26
- Darryl Roberts – Sparta Rotterdam – 2007–08

== Tunisia ==
- Hakim Braham – DS '79 – 1983–84
- Rami Kaib – Heerenveen – 2020–23
- Sayfallah Ltaief – Twente, Sparta Rotterdam – 2024–26
- Omar Rekik – Sparta Rotterdam – 2022–23
- Karim Saidi – Feyenoord – 2004–07
- Hatem Trabelsi – Ajax – 2001–06

== Turkey ==
- Mehmet Akgün – Willem II – 2007–10
- Ali Akman – NEC – 2021–22
- Mustafa Aksit – NAC – 1996–97
- Ceylan Arikan – NAC – 1994–96
- Yusuf Barası – AZ – 2021–23
- Bilal Başaçıkoğlu – Heerenveen, Feyenoord, Heracles Almelo – 2013–18, 2021–22
- Ömer Bayram – NAC – 2009–12
- Sinan Bakış – Heracles Almelo – 2020–22
- Nadir Çiftçi – NAC – 2012–13
- Aykut Demir – NAC, Excelsior – 2006–09
- **Emirhan Demircan** – Utrecht, **Telstar** – 2025–
- Halil Dervişoğlu – Sparta Rotterdam, Twente – 2019–21
- Kenan Durmuşoğlu – AZ, Cambuur – 1996–2000
- Doğan Erdoğan – Fortuna Sittard – 2022–23
- Tarik Evre – PEC Zwolle – 2015–16
- Kerim Frei – Emmen – 2019–21
- Metehan Güçlü – FC Emmen – 2022–23
- Adnan Gülek – Sparta Rotterdam – 1983–84
- Doğucan Haspolat – Excelsior – 2016–19
- Melih İbrahimoğlu – Heracles Almelo – 2020–22
- Uğur İnceman – Roda JC – 2015–16
- Ferdi Kadıoğlu – NEC Nijmegen – 2016–18
- Sinan Kaloğlu – Vitesse – 2009–10
- **Ahmetcan Kaplan** – Ajax, **NEC** – 2023–
- Yasin Karaca – De Graafschap – 2002–03
- Suvat Karadag – Utrecht – 1992–93
- Dennis Kaygin – Willem II – 2024–25
- Colin Kazim-Richards – Feyenoord – 2014–16
- Ahmet Keloğlu – ADO Den Haag – 1980–82
- Orkun Kökçü – Feyenoord – 2018–23
- Evren Korkmaz – VVV-Venlo – 2017–19
- **Hasip Korkmazyürek** – **Fortuna Sittard** – 2024–
- Ahmed Kutucu – Heracles Almelo – 2020–21
- **Emre Mor** – **NEC** – 2026–
- Başar Önal – NEC – 2024–26
- Serdar Öztürk – Groningen – 2007–08
- Oğuzhan Özyakup – Feyenoord, Fortuna Sittard – 2019–20, 2022–24
- Görkem Sağlam – Willem II – 2020-22
- Nuri Şahin – Feyenoord – 2007–08
- Fatih Sonkaya – Roda JC – 1998–2004
- Tunahan Taşçı – Fortuna Sittard – 2022–23
- Ayhan Tumani – FC Volendam, NEC – 1996–99
- Enes Ünal – Twente – 2016–17
- Naci Ünüvar – Twente, Heracles Almelo – 2023–26
- Fuat Usta – Fortuna Sittard, Cambuur, Sparta Rotterdam – 1990–2000
- Abdülhamit Yıldız – FC Volendam – 2008–09
- Burak Yılmaz – Fortuna Sittard – 2022–23
- Cemal Yilmaz – PSV – 1987–89
- Mustafa Yücedağ – Ajax, PEC Zwolle – 1985–88

== Uganda ==
- Melvyn Lorenzen – ADO Den Haag – 2017–19

== Ukraine ==
- Yevhen Levchenko – Vitesse, Cambuur, Groningen, Willem II – 1996–11
- Denys Oliynyk – Vitesse – 2014–16
- Serhiy Pohodin – Roda JC – 1993–94
- **Artem Stepanov** – **Utrecht** – 2025–
- **Viktor Tsyhankov** – **Ajax** – 2026–
- Ruslan Valeyev – De Graafschap – 2000–05
- Oleksandr Yakovenko – ADO Den Haag – 2014–15
- Oleksandr Zinchenko – PSV, Ajax – 2016–17, 2025–26

== United States ==
- Paxten Aaronson – Vitesse, Utrecht – 2023–25
- Juan Agudelo – Utrecht – 2013–14
- Jozy Altidore – AZ – 2011–13
- Hamisi Amani-Dove – AZ – 1996–97
- Agustin Anello – Sparta Rotterdam – 2023–24
- Cole Bassett – Feyenoord, Fortuna Sittard – 2021–23
- DaMarcus Beasley – PSV – 2004–06
- Gregg Berhalter – Sparta Rotterdam, SC Cambuur – 1996–2000
- **Taylor Booth** – Utrecht, **Twente** – 2022–
- Zach Booth – Volendam, Excelsior – 2023–24, 2025–26
- Michael Bradley – Heerenveen – 2006–08
- **Sergiño Dest** – Ajax, **PSV** – 2019–21, 2023–
- Anthony Fontana – PEC Zwolle – 2023–24
- Cory Gibbs – Feyenoord, ADO Den Haag – 2004–06
- **Jalen Hawkins** – **ADO Den Haag** – 2026–
- Aron Jóhannsson – AZ – 2012–15
- David Johnson – Willem II – 2002–05
- Charles Kazlauskas – NEC – 2004–05
- Richard Ledezma – PSV – 2020–25
- Ulysses Llanez – Heerenveen – 2020–21
- Djordje Mihailovic – AZ – 2022–24
- Lee Nguyen – PSV – 2005–06
- Matt Miazga – Vitesse – 2016–18
- John O'Brien – Utrecht, Ajax, ADO Den Haag – 1998–2006
- Shane O'Neill – Excelsior – 2017–18
- Oguchi Onyewu – Twente – 2010–11
- Andrija Novakovich – Fortuna Sittard – 2018–19
- Erik Palmer-Brown – Breda – 2018–19
- **Kevin Paredes** – **Utrecht** – 2026–
- Desevio Payne – Groningen, Excelsior, Emmen – 2014–18, 2019–21
- **Ricardo Pepi** – Groningen, **PSV** – 2022–
- Rubio Rubin – Utrecht – 2014–17
- Alex Skotarek – MVV – 1971–72
- Earnie Stewart – VVV, Willem II, NAC – 1988–89, 1990–96, 1997–99, 2000–03
- Malik Tillman – PSV – 2023–25
- Luca de la Torre – Heracles – 2020–22
- Steve Trittschuh – SVV Dordrecht – 1992–93
- Peter Vermes – FC Volendam – 1989–90
- Haji Wright – VVV – 2019–20

== Uruguay ==
- Yuri Banhoffer – PEC Zwolle – 1978–79
- Pepe Fernández – Go Ahead Eagles, HFC Haarlem – 1970–74
- Facundo González – Feyenoord – 2024–25
- Matías Jones – Groningen – 2011–12
- Nicolás Lodeiro – Ajax – 2009–10, 2011–12
- Gastón Pereiro – PSV – 2015–20
- Fernando Picun – Feyenoord – 1996–99
- Sergio Rochet – AZ – 2014–17
- Mario-Ernesto Rodríguez – Groningen – 1997–98
- Bruno Silva – Groningen, Ajax – 2005–09
- Luis Suárez – Groningen, Ajax – 2006–11
- David Texeira – Groningen – 2011–14

== Venezuela ==
- **Teo Quintero** – **Sparta Rotterdam** – 2024–
- Rubén Alejandro Ramírez – Fortuna Sittard – 2018–19
- Roberto Rosales – Twente – 2010–14
- Christian Santos – NEC – 2015–16

== Wales ==
- Jimmy Cardno – HFC Haarlem – 1973–74
- Simon Church – Roda JC – 2016–17
- Nick Deacy – PSV, Vitesse – 1975–78, 1979–80
- Trevor Ford – PSV – 1957–60
- Paul Giles – Excelsior, Dordrecht – 1983–84
- Cian Harries – Fortuna Sittard – 2019–20
- Barry Hughes – Blauw-Wit – 1961–63
- James Lawrence – Almere City – 2024–25
- George Thomas – ADO Den Haag – 2019–20

== Yugoslavia ==
- Petar Adjanski – FC Eindhoven, Willem II – 1975–77, 1980–82
- Zvonko Bego – Twente – 1967–68
- Nebojša Brajović – MVV – 1978–79
- Božo Broketa – Ajax – 1958–59
- Nikola Budišić – NAC – 1974–79
- Nedeljko Bulatović – Twente, Sittardia, Fortuna Sittard – 1965–66, 1967–69
- Boško Bursać – Vitesse – 1977–80
- Ladislav Butković – MVV – 1958–59
- Srđan Čebinac – Fortuna Sittard – 1966–68
- Zvezdan Čebinac – PSV – 1966–67
- Nenad Cerović – RKC Waalwijk – 1989–90
- Vladimir Ćirić – SVV, Den Bosch – 1969–73
- Dušan Ćosić – Willem II – 1979–80
- Jovan Ćurčić – USV Elinkwijk – 1966–67
- Pavle Dolezar – Go Ahead Eagles – 1971–72
- Joško Gluić – Go Ahead Eagles, Ajax – 1974–77
- Blagoj Istatov – Utrecht – 1976–78
- Aleksandar Jončić – Xerxes/DHC'66 – 1966–68
- Miodrag Jovanović – VVV – 1976–79
- Pavle Kiš – PSV – 1968–69
- Rajko Kovačević – Feyenoord – 1977–78
- Stefan Kurčinac – VVV – 1975–81
- Stjepan Matić – Sparta Rotterdam, Telstar – 1975–76, 1976–77
- Ivan Matijasić – Telstar – 1966–67
- Rizah Mešković – AZ – 1976–79
- Đorđe Milić – Utrecht – 1968–69
- Zoran Mišić – Twente – 1966–73
- Blagoje Mitić – Willem II – 1966–67
- Ilija Mitić – Den Bosch – 1971–73
- Krsto Mitrović – Fortuna Sittard – 1982–83
- Josip Mohorović – NAC – 1976–79
- Fikret Mujkić – NAC – 1974–75
- Husref Musemić – Twente – 1990–91
- Milan Nikolić – PSV, Willem II – 1956–57, 1958–61
- Blagoje Paunović – Utrecht – 1975–77
- Dojčin Perazić – FC Den Haag – 1974–78
- Aleksandar Petaković – Fortuna '54 – 1963–65
- Ivan Pintarić – Breda – 1968–69
- Dragan Popadić – Haarlem – 1974–75
- Ivan Popović – Sittardia – 1966–67
- Tomislav Prosen – NEC – 1971–72
- Lazar Radović – Xerxes, PSV – 1966–72
- Mladen Ramljak – Feyenoord – 1973–77
- Jovan Rasić – AZ – 1968–69
- Dragan Samardžić – Willem II – 1979–80
- Spasoje Samardžić – Twente, Feyenoord – 1966–69
- Slobodan Savić – FC Eindhoven – 1976–77
- Božidar Senčar – Breda – 1957–58
- Josip Simoković – DWS – 1967–68
- Edin Sprečo – NAC – 1975–76
- Milan Stanić – Telstar – 1969–72
- Miroslav Vardić – Breda – 1973–75
- Velibor Vasović – Ajax – 1966–71
- Branislav Veljković – DOS – 1968–69
- Branimir Vratnjan – Holland Sport – 1967–69
- Mario Vušković – Go Ahead Eagles – 1975–79

== Zambia ==
- Kåre Becker – Twente – 1995–96
- Kalusha Bwalya – PSV – 1989–94
- Jacob Mulenga – Utrecht, Go Ahead Eagles – 2009–14, 2021–22

== Zimbabwe ==
- Marvelous Nakamba – Vitesse – 2014–17

== Notes ==
1. Born in Angola
2. Born in Armenia (then part of Soviet Union)
3. Born in Argentina
4. Born in Australia
5. Born in Austria
6. Born in Azerbaijan
7. Born in Belgium
8. Born in Bosnia and Herzegovina
9. Born in Bosnia and Herzegovina (then part of SFR Yugoslavia)
10. Born in Brazil
11. Born in Cameroon
12. Born in Canada
13. Born in Cape Verde
14. Born in Colombia
15. Born in Croatia
16. Born in Croatia (then part of SFR Yugoslavia)
17. Born in Czech Republic
18. Born in Democratic Republic of Congo
19. Born in Democratic Republic of Congo (then Zaire)
20. Born in Denmark
21. Born in Dominican Republic
22. Born in Egypt
23. Born in England
24. Born in Finland
25. Born in France
26. Born in the French Guiana (Overseas department of the French Republic)
27. Born in Gambia
28. Born in Germany
29. Born in Ghana
30. Born in Greece
31. Born in Greenland (autonomous country within the Kingdom of Denmark)
32. Born in Guadeloupe (Overseas department of the France)
33. Born in Germany
34. Born in Ghana
35. Born in Guinea
36. Born in Guinea Bissau
37. Born in Haiti
38. Born in Iran
39. Born in Iraq
40. Born in Israel
41. Born in Italy
42. Born in the Ivory Coast
43. Born in Jamaica
44. Born in Kosovo (then part of SFR Yugoslavia)
45. Born in Kosovo (then part of FR Yugoslavia)
46. Born in Lebanon
47. Born in Liberia
48. Born in Luxembourg
49. Born in Mayotte (Overseas territory of the French Republic)
50. Born in Monaco
51. Born in Montenegro (then part of SFR Yugoslavia)
52. Born in Montenegro (then part of FR Yugoslavia)
53. Born in Morocco
54. Born in Mozambique (then Portuguese Mozambique)
55. Born in the Netherlands
56. Born in Nigeria
57. Born in New Zealand
58. Born in Norway
59. Born in Poland
60. Born in Portugal
61. Born in the Republic of Ireland
62. Born in Russia (then part of Soviet Union)
63. Born in Scotland
64. Born in Senegal
65. Born in Serbia (then part of SFR Yugoslavia)
66. Born in Serbia (then part of FR Yugoslavia)
67. Born in Slovakia (then part of Czechoslovakia)
68. Born in Somalia
69. Born in South Africa
70. Born in Spain
71. Born in Sweden
72. Born in Switzerland
73. Born in Trinidad and Tobago
74. Born in Turkey
75. Born in Ukraine (then part of Soviet Union)
76. Born in Uruguay
77. Born in the United States of America
78. Born in West Germany (now part of Germany)
79. Born in Zimbabwe (then Rhodesia)
80. Capped for the Albania national football team
81. Capped for the Albania national under-21 football team
82. Capped for the Albania national under-19 football team
83. Capped for the Albania national under-17 football team
84. Capped for the Armenia national under-17 football team
85. Capped for the Australia national under-23 football team
86. Capped for the Austria national under-21 football team
87. Capped for the Austria national under-20 football team
88. Capped for the Austria national under-19 football team
89. Capped for the Austria national under-18 football team
90. Capped for the Austria national under-17 football team
91. Capped for the Basque Country national football team
92. Capped for the Belgium national football team
93. Capped for the Belgium national under-21 football team
94. Capped for the Belgium national under-20 football team
95. Capped for the Belgium national under-19 football team
96. Capped for the Belgium national under-18 football team
97. Capped for the Belgium national under-17 football team
98. Capped for the Belgium national under-16 football team
99. Capped for the Belgium national under-15 football team
100. Capped for the Bosnia and Herzegovina national under-19 football team
101. Capped for the Bosnia and Herzegovina national under-17 football team
102. Capped for the Canada national under-23 football team
103. Capped for the Canada national under-20 football team
104. Capped for the Catalonia national football team
105. Capped for the Congo national football team
106. Capped for the Democratic Republic of Congo national under-23 football team
107. Capped for the Denmark national under-21 football team
108. Capped for the Denmark national under-20 football team
109. Capped for the Denmark national under-19 football team
110. Capped for the Denmark national under-18 football team
111. Capped for the Denmark national under-17 football team
112. Capped for the England national under-21 football team
113. Capped for the England national under-19 football team
114. Capped for the England national under-18 football team
115. Capped for the England national under-17 football team
116. Capped for the England national under-16 football team
117. Capped for the Finland national football team
118. Capped for the Finland national under-21 football team
119. Capped for the Finland national under-20 football team
120. Capped for the Finland national under-19 football team
121. Capped for the Finland national under-18 football team
122. Capped for the Finland national under-17 football team
123. Capped for the Finland national under-16 football team
124. Capped for the France national under-21 football team
125. Capped for the France national under-20 football team
126. Capped for the France national under-19 football team
127. Capped for the France national under-18 football team
128. Capped for the France national under-17 football team
129. Capped for the France national under-16 football team
130. Capped for the Galicia national football team
131. Capped for the Germany national under-21 football team
132. Capped for the Germany national under-20 football team
133. Capped for the Germany national under-19 football team
134. Capped for the Germany national under-18 football team
135. Capped for the Germany national under-17 football team
136. Capped for the Germany national under-16 football team
137. Capped for the Germany national under-15 football team
138. Capped for the Greece national under-17 football team
139. Capped for the Greece national under-16 football team
140. Capped for the Iceland national under-21 football team
141. Capped for the Italy national under-16 football team
142. Capped for the Kosovo national football team
143. Capped for the Luxembourg national under-21 football team
144. Capped for the Luxembourg national under-19 football team
145. Capped for the Luxembourg national under-17 football team
146. Capped for the Luxembourg national under-16 football team
147. Capped for the Montenegro national under-21 football team
148. Capped for the Morocco national football team
149. Capped for the Netherlands Antilles national football team
150. Capped for the Netherlands Antilles national under-20 football team
151. Capped for the Netherlands national football team
152. Capped for the Netherlands national under-21 football team
153. Capped for the Netherlands national under-20 football team
154. Capped for the Netherlands national under-19 football team
155. Capped for the Netherlands national under-18 football team
156. Capped for the Netherlands national under-17 football team
157. Capped for the Netherlands national under-16 football team
158. Capped for the Netherlands national under-15 football team
159. Capped for the Norway national football team
160. Capped for the Norway national under-21 football team
161. Capped for the Norway national under-19 football team
162. Capped for the Norway national under-17 football team
163. Capped for the Norway national under-16 football team
164. Capped for the Norway national under-15 football team
165. Capped for the Peru national under-20 football team
166. Capped for the Poland national under-20 football team
167. Capped for the Poland national under-19 football team
168. Capped for the Poland national under-18 football team
169. Capped for the Portugal national football team
170. Capped for the Portugal national under-23 football team
171. Capped for the Portugal national under-21 football team
172. Capped for the Portugal national under-20 football team
173. Capped for the Portugal national under-19 football team
174. Capped for the Portugal national under-18 football team
175. Capped for the Portugal national under-17 football team
176. Capped for the Portugal national under-16 football team
177. Capped for the Republic of Ireland national under-17 football team
178. Capped for the Republic of Ireland national under-16 football team
179. Capped for the Scotland national under-16 football team
180. Capped for the Senegal national under-17 football team
181. Capped for the Serbia national under-18 football team
182. Capped for the Serbia and Montenegro national football team
183. Capped for the Serbia and Montenegro national under-23 football team
184. Capped for the Serbia and Montenegro national under-21 football team
185. Capped for the Serbia and Montenegro national under-19 football team
186. Capped for the Serbia and Montenegro national under-17 football team
187. Capped for the Sweden men's national football team
188. Capped for the Sweden national under-21 football team
189. Capped for the Sweden national under-20 football team
190. Capped for the Sweden men's national under-19 football team
191. Capped for the Sweden national under-18 football team
192. Capped for the Sweden men's national under-17 football team
193. Capped for the Sweden national under-16 football team
194. Capped for the Switzerland national under-21 football team
195. Capped for the Switzerland national under-20 football team
196. Capped for the Switzerland national under-19 football team
197. Capped for the Switzerland national under-18 football team
198. Capped for the Switzerland national under-17 football team
199. Capped for the Switzerland national under-16 football team
200. Capped for the Switzerland national under-15 football team
201. Capped for the Ukraine national football team
202. Capped for the United States national football team
203. Capped for the United States national under-23 football team
204. Capped for the United States national under-19 football team
205. Capped for the Yugoslavia national football team
