= 2021–22 Fortuna Sittard season =

Fortuna Sittard
2021–22 season
- Chairman: Özgür Işıtan Gün
- Manager: Sjors Ultee
- Stadium: Fortuna Sittard Stadion
- Eredivisie: 15th
- KNVB Cup: Second round
- Top goalscorer: League: Mats Seuntjens (8); All: Mats Seuntjens (8)
- Highest home attendance: 8,333 (vs. AFC Ajax, 21 September 2021)
- Lowest home attendance: 6,300 (vs. FC Twente, 14 August 2021)
- Average home league attendance: 6,997
- Biggest win: 2–1 (vs. FC Twente (h), 14 August 2021)
Home colours	Away colours	Third colours

The 2021–22 season was the 54th season in the existence of Fortuna Sittard and the club's fourth consecutive season in the top flight of Dutch football. In addition to the domestic league, Fortuna Sittard participated in the KNVB Cup.

== Players ==
=== First-team squad ===
As of 13 February 2022

Note: Flags indicate national team as defined under FIFA eligibility rules; some limited exceptions apply. Players may hold more than one non-FIFA nationality.

No.	Pos.	Nation	Player
1	GK	NED	Yanick van Osch
2	DF	SUI	Martin Angha
4	DF	NED	Roel Janssen
6	MF	CPV	Deroy Duarte
7	MF	CPV	Lisandro Semedo
8	FW	NED	Zian Flemming
9	FW	CUW	Charlison Benschop
10	MF	NED	Mats Seuntjens (vice-captain)
11	FW	NED	Paul Gladon
12	DF	POR	Ivo Pinto (on loan from Dinamo Zagreb)
14	MF	SWE	Tesfaldet Tekie
17	FW	COD	Jordan Botaka (on loan from Gent)
18	DF	NED	Nigel Lonwijk (on loan from Wolverhampton)
19	MF	GER	Arianit Ferati

No.	Pos.	Nation	Player
22	MF	GRE	Andreas Samaris
23	MF	NED	Ben Rienstra (captain)
24	FW	FRA	Samy Baghdadi
25	MF	BEL	Mickaël Tirpan
27	DF	NED	Ronan Pluijmen
28	MF	IRL	Ryan Johansson (on loan from Sevilla Atlético)
29	MF	NED	Richie Musaba
32	GK	GER	Felix Dornebusch
33	DF	GRE	Dimitrios Siovas
34	GK	NED	Michael Verrips (on loan from Sheffield United)
35	DF	ENG	George Cox
41	GK	NED	Tom Hendriks
77	FW	NED	Tijjani Noslin

=== Out on loan ===
Note: Flags indicate national team as defined under FIFA eligibility rules; some limited exceptions apply. Players may hold more than one non-FIFA nationality.

No.	Pos.	Nation	Player
—	GK	NED	Ruben van Kouwen (at MVV Maastricht)
—	GK	GER	Joshua Wehking (at MVV Maastricht)
—	DF	NED	Mike van Beijnen (at Den Bosch)
—	MF	TUR	Yiğit Emre Çeltik (at Podbeskidzie)

No.	Pos.	Nation	Player
—	MF	BEL	Adnan Ugur (at Fatih Karagümrük)
—	FW	KOS	Arian Kastrati (at MVV Maastricht)
—	FW	NED	Toshio Lake (at MVV Maastricht)

== Transfers ==
=== In ===
Date	Pos.	Name	From	Fee	Ref.
1 July 2021	GK	Felix Dornebusch	Eintracht Braunschweig	Free	
27 July 2021	MF	Yigit Emre Celtik	Altinordu	Free	
29 July 2021	MF	Arianit Ferati	Waldhof Mannheim	Free	
3 August 2021	FW	Samy Baghdadi	RC Grasse	Free	
11 August 2021	FW	Tijjani Noslin	TOP Oss	Free	
12 August 2021	MF	Deroy Duarte	Sparta Rotterdam	Free	
26 August 2021	GK	Ruben van Kouwen	NEC Nijmegen	Free	
27 August 2021	DF	Mickaël Tirpan	Kasimpasa	Undisclosed	
19 November 2021	MF	Andreas Samaris	N/A	Free	

=== Loans in ===
Date from	Date to	Pos.	Name	From	Ref.
13 August 2021	End of season	MF	Ryan Johansson	Sevilla Atlético	
16 August 2021	End of season	DF	Ivo Pinto	Dinamo Zagreb	
31 August 2021	End of season	DF	Nigel Lonwijk	Wolves U23	

=== Out ===
Date	Pos.	Name	To	Fee	Ref.
10 June 2021	FW	André Vidigal	Marítimo	Undisclosed	
16 June 2021	FW	Djibril Dianessy	Pau FC	Free	
1 July 2021	DF	Grégoire Amiot	Released	N/A	
1 July 2021	MF	Nassim el Ablak	Released	N/A	
1 July 2021	GK	Piet Velthuizen	Released	N/A	
17 July 2021	FW	Rasmus Karjalainen	Helsingborg	Undisclosed	
27 July 2021	MF	Dimitrios Ioannidis	Rot Weiss Ahlen	Free	
5 August 2021	DF	Özgür Aktas	Telstar	Free	
13 August 2021	FW	Sebastian Polter	VfL Bochum	Free	
24 August 2021	FW	Jacky Donkor	FC Dordrecht	Free	
27 August 2021	FW	Leroy George	De Treffers	Free	
31 August 2021	DF	Clint Essers	MVV Maastricht	Free	
2 September 2021	DF	Lazaros Rota	AEK Athens	Free	
3 September 2021	FW	Thibaud Verlinden	Dunajska Streda	Free	

=== Loans out ===
Date from	Date to	Pos.	Name	To	Ref.
5 August 2021	End of season	DF	Mike van Beijnen	FC Den Bosch	
18 August 2021	2022	GK	Joshua Wehking	MVV Maastricht	
31 August 2021	End of season	FW	Arian Kastrati	NK Dekani	
6 September 2021	End of season	MF	Adnan Ugur	Karagümrük	

== Pre-season and friendlies ==
Win Draw Loss Fixtures

10 July 2021 Friendly	Fortuna Sittard (Belgium)	Cancelled	(Netherlands) MVV Maastricht	Netherlands
12:00 CEST (UTC+2)

14 July 2021 Friendly	OH Leuven (Belgium)	Cancelled	(Netherlands) Fortuna Sittard	Belgium
--:-- CEST (UTC+2)

17 July 2021 Friendly	Beerschot (Belgium)	1–1	(Netherlands) Fortuna Sittard	Belgium
16:00 CEST (UTC+2)

21 July 2021 Friendly	Fortuna Sittard (Netherlands)	1–1	(Greece) OFI	Netherlands
18:00 CEST (UTC+2)

7 August 2021 Friendly	FC Utrecht (Netherlands)	2–3	(Netherlands) Fortuna Sittard	Utrecht, Netherlands
13:00 CEST (UTC+2)	Douvikas 15'; Ramselaar 55'	Report	Janssen (yellow card); Douvikas 3' (o.g.); Sambou 44'; Seuntjens 62' (pen.)	Stadium: Sportcomplex Zoudenbalch; Attendance: 200

7 August 2021 Friendly	FC Utrecht (Netherlands)	7–0	(Netherlands) Fortuna Sittard	Utrecht, Netherlands
15:00 CEST (UTC+2)	Balk 20', 26'; Dalmau 32', 44' (pen.), 51'; Sylla 53', 58'	Report		Stadium: Sportcomplex Zoudenbalch; Attendance: 200

== Competitions ==
=== Overall record ===
Competition	First match	Last match	Starting round	Final position	Record							
Competition	First match	Last match	Starting round	Final position	Pld	W	D	L	GF	GA	GD	Win %
Eredivisie	14 August 2021	15 May 2021	Matchday 1	15th	34	10	5	19	36	67	−31	29.41
KNVB Cup	27 October 2021	15 December 2021	First round	Second round	2	1	0	1	3	2	+1	50.00
Total					36	11	5	20	39	69	−30	30.56

Source: Soccerway

=== Eredivisie ===
==== League table ====
Pos	Team	Pld	W	D	L	GF	GA	GD	Pts	Qualification or relegation
13	Go Ahead Eagles	34	10	6	18	37	51	−14	36	
14	Sparta Rotterdam	34	8	11	15	30	48	−18	35	
15	Fortuna Sittard	34	10	5	19	36	67	−31	35	
16	Heracles Almelo (R)	34	9	7	18	33	49	−16	34	Qualification for the Relegation play-offs
17	Willem II (R)	34	9	6	19	32	57	−25	33	Relegation to Eerste Divisie

Source: Eredivisie
Rules for classification: Season in progress: 1) Most points won; 2) Less points lost; 3) Goal difference; 4) Goals scored; 5) Alphabetical order; End of season: 1) Points; 2) Goal difference; 3) Goals scored; 4) Head-to-head points; 5) Head-to-head goal difference; 6) Head-to-head away goals scored; 7) Play-off if relevant for deciding champion, relegation or participating in a European league, otherwise by draw. 8) Penalty shoot-out (only after a play-off)
(R) Relegated

==== Results summary ====
Overall								Home						Away					
Pld	W	D	L	GF	GA	GD	Pts	W	D	L	GF	GA	GD	W	D	L	GF	GA	GD
34	10	5	19	36	67	−31	35	6	2	9	20	31	−11	4	3	10	16	36	−20

Source: Eredivisie

==== Results by round ====
Round	1	2	3	4	5	6	7	8	9	10	11	12	13	14	15	16	17	18	19	20	21	22	23	24	25	26	27	28	29	30	31	32	33	34
Ground	H	A	H	A	A	H	A	H	H	A	A	H	A	H	A	A	H	A	H	A	H	A	H	A	H	H	A	H	A	H	H	A	H	A
Result	W	L	D	L	L	L	D	L	W	D	L	L	L	L	L	W	D	L	L	L	W	W	W	L	L	W	L	L	D	W	L	W	L	W
Position	5	7	9	13	16	17	17	17	14	16	16	17	17	17	17	16	16	17	17	17	16	16	15	15	16	14	15	16	15	14	15	15	16	15

Source: Eredivisie
A = Away; H = Home; W = Win; D = Draw; L = Loss

==== Matches ====
The league fixtures were announced on 11 June 2021.

14 August 2021 1	Fortuna Sittard	2–1	FC Twente	Sittard
20:00 CEST (UTC+2)	Seuntjens (yellow card) 33', (goal) 60'; Duarte (yellow card) 72'; Lake 80'	Report	v. Wolfswinkel (yellow card) 32', (goal) 35'; Menig (yellow card) 80'	Stadium: Fortuna Sittard Stadion; Attendance: 6,300; Referee: Jochem Kamphuis

1 December 2021 2	AZ	2-1	Fortuna Sittard	Alkmaar
17:45 CEST (UTC+2)	Pavlidis 41'; Karlsson 51'; Chatzidiakos (yellow card) 57'	Report	Flemming 9'; Musaba (yellow card) 13'; Cox (yellow card) 90+5'	Stadium: AFAS Stadion; Attendance: 6,645; Referee: Dennis Higler

27 August 2021 3	Fortuna Sittard	2-2	RKC Waalwijk	Sittard
20:00 CEST (UTC+2)	Baghdadi 23'; Seuntjens 68'; Angha (yellow card) 71'	Report	Odgaard (yellow card) 12'; Kramer 38', 55'	Stadium: Fortuna Sittard Stadion; Attendance: 6470; Referee: Jeroen Manschot

12 September 2021 4	Sparta Rotterdam	3-1	Fortuna Sittard	Rotterdam
14:30 CEST (UTC+2)	Smeets 21'; Thy 29'; Beugelsdijk (yellow card) 42'; Pinto (yellow card) 44'; Emegha 73'	Report	Seuntjens 49'; Flemming (yellow card) 63'	Stadium: Sparta Stadion Het Kasteel; Attendance: 6623; Referee: Erwin Blank

18 September 2021 5	SC Heerenveen	1-0	Fortuna Sittard	Heerenveen
16:30 CEST (UTC+2)	Veerman 5'; Drešević (yellow card) 64'	Report	Sambou (yellow card) 59'; Baghdadi (yellow card) 76'; Noslin (yellow card) 90+6'; Duarte (yellow card) 90+6'	Stadium: Abe Lenstra Stadion; Attendance: 16400; Referee: Laurens Gerrets

21 September 2021 6	Fortuna Sittard	0-5	Ajax	Sittard
18:45 CEST (UTC+2)	Janssen (yellow card) 49'	Report	Berghuis 11'; Mazraoui 27'; Tadić 38'; Kudus 72'; Tagliafico 77'	Stadium: Fortuna Sittard Stadion; Attendance: 8333; Referee: Jochem Kamphuis

25 September 2021 7	Vitesse	1-1	Fortuna Sittard	Arnhem
18:45 CEST (UTC+2)	Huisman (yellow card) 30'; Frederiksen 49'; Bazoer (yellow card) 76'	Report	Seuntjens 2'; Janssen (yellow card) 34'; Duarte (yellow card) 36'; Sambou (yellow card) 69'	Stadium: Gelredome; Attendance: 11631; Referee: Ingmar Oostrom

2 October 2021 8	Fortuna Sittard	1-3	N.E.C. Nijmegen	Sittard
21:00 CEST (UTC+2)	Seuntjens 34' (pen.); Tekie (yellow card) 36'; Johansson (yellow card) 85'	Report	Okita 21'; Tavşan 26'; Odenthal (yellow card) 41'; Bruijn (yellow card) 45+1', (goal) 52'	Stadium: Fortuna Sittard Stadion; Attendance: 7011; Referee: Jeroen Manschot

16 October 2021 9	Fortuna Sittard	1-0	SC Cambuur	Sittard
21:00 CEST (UTC+2)	Tirpan (yellow card) 53'; Cox (yellow card) 64' (goal) 86'; Flemming (yellow card) 68'	Report	Jacobs (yellow card) 32'	Stadium: Fortuna Sittard Stadion; Attendance: 6873; Referee: Dennis Higler

22 October 2021 10	Willem II	1-1	Fortuna Sittard	Tilburg
20:00 CEST (UTC+2)	Wellenreuther (yellow card) 55'; Köhlert 59'	Report	Angha (yellow card) 45'; Noslin 54'; Seuntjens (yellow card) 75'	Stadium: Koning Willem II Stadion; Attendance: 14057; Referee: Annick Van Der Laan

=== KNVB Cup ===
27 October 2021 First round	Fortuna Sittard	3–0	TOP Oss	Sittard
18:00 CEST (UTC+2)	Seuntjens 29'; Cox 39' 51'	Report	Doğan (yellow card) 56'	Stadium: Fortuna Sittard Stadion; Attendance: 3,053; Referee: Kevin Blom

15 December 2021 Second round	PSV	2–0	Fortuna Sittard	Eindhoven
21:00 CET (UTC+1)	Dōan 28', 62'; Gutiérrez (yellow card) 77'	Report	Pinto (yellow card) 38'	Stadium: Philips Stadion; Attendance: 0 Referee: Martin van den Kerkhof
