= List of Dutch football transfers winter 2021–22 =

This is a list of Dutch football transfers for the 2021–22 winter transfer window. Only transfers featuring Eredivisie are listed.

== Eredivisie ==
Note: Flags indicate national team as has been defined under FIFA eligibility rules. Players may hold more than one non-FIFA nationality.

=== Ajax ===
In:

| No. | Pos. | Nation | Player |
|---|---|---|---|
| 18 | FW | NED | Brian Brobbey (on loan from (Germany) RB Leipzig) |
| — | MF | NED | Mohamed Ihattaren (on loan from (Italy) Juventus, previously on loan at (Italy) Sampdoria) |

Out:

| No. | Pos. | Nation | Player |
|---|---|---|---|
| 7 | FW | BRA | David Neres (to (Ukraine) Shakhtar Donetsk) |

=== PSV ===
In:

| No. | Pos. | Nation | Player |
|---|---|---|---|
| 23 | MF | NED | Joey Veerman (from Heerenveen) |

Out:

| No. | Pos. | Nation | Player |
|---|---|---|---|
| 14 | MF | NED | Davy Pröpper (retired) |
| 34 | MF | BEL | Dante Rigo (to (Belgium) Beerschot) |

=== AZ ===
In:

| No. | Pos. | Nation | Player |
|---|---|---|---|
| 8 | MF | GHA | Kamal Sowah (on loan from (Belgium) Club Brugge) |
| 26 | DF | HUN | Milos Kerkez (from (Italy) Milan Primavera) |

Out:

| No. | Pos. | Nation | Player |
|---|---|---|---|
| 25 | MF | NED | Thijs Oosting (to Willem II) |
| 28 | MF | ISL | Albert Guðmundsson (to (Italy) Genoa) |
| — | MF | NED | Kenzo Goudmijn (on loan to Excelsior, previously on loan at Sparta Rotterdam) |
| — | FW | NED | Ferdy Druijf (on loan to (Austria) Rapid Wien, previously on loan at (Belgium) Mechelen) |

=== Vitesse ===
In:

| No. | Pos. | Nation | Player |
|---|---|---|---|
| 9 | FW | AUT | Adrian Grbić (on loan from (France) Lorient) |

Out:

| No. | Pos. | Nation | Player |
|---|---|---|---|
| 9 | FW | ALG | Oussama Darfalou (on loan to PEC Zwolle) |
| 14 | MF | MAR | Oussama Tannane (to (Turkey) Göztepe) |
| 19 | FW | SUI | Julian Von Moos (loan return to (Switzerland) Basel) |

=== Feyenoord ===
In:

| No. | Pos. | Nation | Player |
|---|---|---|---|
| — | GK | ROU | Valentin Cojocaru (on loan from (Ukraine) Dnipro-1) |
| 6 | MF | NED | Jorrit Hendrix (on loan from (Russia) Spartak Moscow) |
| 13 | DF | NED | Philippe Sandler (from (England) Manchester City, previously on loan at (France) Troyes) |
| 19 | MF | USA | Cole Bassett (on loan from (United States) Colorado Rapids) |
| 23 | MF | SWE | Patrik Wålemark (from (Sweden) Häcken) |

Out:

| No. | Pos. | Nation | Player |
|---|---|---|---|
| 6 | MF | NED | Mark Diemers (on loan to (Germany) Hannover 96) |
| 16 | MF | BEL | Francesco Antonucci (on loan to Volendam) |
| 20 | MF | POR | João Carlos Teixeira (to (Portugal) Famalicão) |
| 23 | FW | SEN | Aliou Baldé (on loan to (Belgium) Waasland-Beveren) |
| 24 | FW | NED | Naoufal Bannis (on loan to NAC Breda) |
| — | MF | GER | Christian Conteh (on loan to Dordrecht, previously on loan at (Germany) SV Sandhausen) |

=== Utrecht ===
In:

| No. | Pos. | Nation | Player |
|---|---|---|---|
| 7 | FW | JPN | Naoki Maeda (on loan from (Japan) Nagoya Grampus) |
| 18 | FW | NED | Henk Veerman (from Heerenveen) |

Out:

| No. | Pos. | Nation | Player |
|---|---|---|---|
| 1 | GK | NED | Maarten Paes (on loan to (United States) Dallas) |
| 9 | FW | ESP | Adrián Dalmau (to Sparta Rotterdam) |
| 17 | DF | MAR | Benaissa Benamar (on loan to Volendam) |
| 19 | MF | NED | Davy van den Berg (on loan to Roda JC) |

=== Groningen ===
In:

| No. | Pos. | Nation | Player |
|---|---|---|---|
| 14 | MF | BEL | Emmanuel Matuta (from Jong PSV) |
| 18 | DF | NED | Melayro Bogarde (on loan from (Germany) TSG 1899 Hoffenheim) |

Out:

| No. | Pos. | Nation | Player |
|---|---|---|---|
| 4 | DF | NED | Wessel Dammers (on loan to Willem II) |
| 14 | FW | NED | Patrick Joosten (on loan to Cambuur) |
| 30 | DF | SWE | Elias Olsson (loan return to (Sweden) Kalmar FF) |

=== Sparta Rotterdam ===
In:

| No. | Pos. | Nation | Player |
|---|---|---|---|
| — | GK | NGR | Maduka Okoye (on loan from (England) Watford) |
| — | FW | ESP | Adrián Dalmau (from Utrecht) |
| — | MF | DEN | Younes Namli (on loan from (Russia) Krasnodar, previously on loan at (United States) Colorado Rapids) |
| — | MF | BEL | Arno Verschueren (on loan from (Belgium) Lommel) |
| — | MF | NED | Joeri de Kamps (on loan from (Slovakia) Slovan Bratislava) |
| — | DF | DEN | Riza Durmisi (on loan from (Italy) Lazio) |

Out:

| No. | Pos. | Nation | Player |
|---|---|---|---|
| — | GK | NGR | Maduka Okoye (to (England) Watford) |
| — | MF | NED | Kenzo Goudmijn (loan return to AZ) |
| — | MF | SYR | Mohammed Osman (free agent) |
| — | FW | NED | Emanuel Emegha (to (Belgium) Antwerp) |
| — | MF | NED | Bryan Smeets (to (Belgium) Lommel) |

=== Heracles Almelo ===
In:

| No. | Pos. | Nation | Player |
|---|---|---|---|
| 21 | DF | NED | Justin Hoogma (from (Germany) TSG 1899 Hoffenheim, previously on loan at (Germany) Greuther Fürth) |
| 29 | FW | SWE | Emil Hansson (from Fortuna Sittard) |
| 30 | MF | MAR | Anas Ouahim (from (Germany) SV Sandhausen) |
| 33 | FW | SWE | Samuel Armenteros (free agent) |

Out:

| No. | Pos. | Nation | Player |
|---|---|---|---|
| 30 | MF | BDI | Mohamed Amissi (to Roda JC) |
| 34 | GK | NED | Alessandro Damen (on loan to ADO Den Haag) |
| 37 | FW | NED | Delano Burgzorg (on loan to (Germany) 1. FSV Mainz 05) |
| — | FW | CUW | Jeremy Cijntje (on loan to Den Bosch, previously on loan at Roda JC) |

=== Twente ===
In:

| No. | Pos. | Nation | Player |
|---|---|---|---|
| 20 | DF | NED | Joshua Brenet (from (Germany) TSG 1899 Hoffenheim) |

Out:

| No. | Pos. | Nation | Player |
|---|---|---|---|
| 8 | MF | SRB | Luka Ilić (loan return to (England) Manchester City) |
| 17 | DF | NED | Jayden Oosterwolde (on loan to (Italy) Parma) |
| 43 | DF | BIH | Dario Đumić (to (Germany) SV Sandhausen) |

=== Fortuna Sittard ===
In:

| No. | Pos. | Nation | Player |
|---|---|---|---|
| 9 | FW | CUW | Charlison Benschop (from (Germany) SV Sandhausen) |
| 11 | FW | NED | Paul Gladon (free agent) |
| 17 | FW | COD | Jordan Botaka (on loan from (Belgium) Gent) |
| 33 | DF | GRE | Dimitris Siovas (free agent) |
| 34 | GK | NED | Michael Verrips (on loan from (England) Sheffield United) |

Out:

| No. | Pos. | Nation | Player |
|---|---|---|---|
| 11 | FW | SWE | Emil Hansson (to Heracles Almelo) |
| 21 | MF | TUR | Yiğit Emre Çeltik (on loan to (Poland) Podbeskidzie) |
| 30 | GK | NED | Ruben van Kouwen (on loan to MVV) |
| 39 | FW | NED | Toshio Lake (on loan to MVV) |
| 45 | FW | GER | Bassala Sambou (to (England) Crewe Alexandra) |
| — | FW | KOS | Arian Kastrati (on loan to MVV, previously on loan at (Slovenia) Dekani) |

=== Heerenveen ===
In:

| No. | Pos. | Nation | Player |
|---|---|---|---|
| 3 | DF | NED | Joost van Aken (free agent) |
| 9 | FW | SWE | Amin Sarr (from (Sweden) Malmö, previously on loan at (Sweden) Mjällby) |
| 20 | FW | NED | Sydney van Hooijdonk (on loan from (Italy) Bologna) |
| 26 | MF | MAR | Anas Tahiri (from (Romania) CFR Cluj) |
| 33 | MF | NED | Thom Haye (from NAC Breda) |

Out:

| No. | Pos. | Nation | Player |
|---|---|---|---|
| 8 | FW | SWE | Benjamin Nygren (loan return to (Belgium) Genk) |
| 9 | FW | NED | Henk Veerman (to Utrecht) |
| 20 | MF | NED | Joey Veerman (to PSV) |
| 21 | MF | NED | Rodney Kongolo (to (Italy) Cosenza) |
| — | DF | URU | Joaquín Fernández (on loan to (Uruguay) Atenas, previously on loan at (Uruguay) Montevideo City Torque) |
| — | FW | NOR | Runar Espejord (to (Norway) Bodø/Glimt, previously on loan at (Norway) Tromsø) |

=== PEC Zwolle ===
In:

| No. | Pos. | Nation | Player |
|---|---|---|---|
| 21 | DF | NED | Djavan Anderson (on loan from (Italy) Lazio, previously on loan at (Italy) Cosenza) |
| 22 | FW | NED | Max de Waal (on loan from Jong Ajax) |
| 29 | FW | ALG | Oussama Darfalou (on loan from Vitesse) |
| 30 | DF | NED | Maikel van der Werff (from (United States) Cincinnati) |

Out:

| No. | Pos. | Nation | Player |
|---|---|---|---|
| 14 | MF | NED | Leandro Fernandes (to (Norway) Jerv) |
| 27 | DF | LBR | Mark Pabai (to (Italy) SPAL) |

=== Willem II ===
In:

| No. | Pos. | Nation | Player |
|---|---|---|---|
| 2 | DF | GER | Kilian Ludewig (on loan from (Austria) RB Salzburg) |
| 6 | DF | NED | Wessel Dammers (on loan from Groningen) |
| 9 | FW | NED | Jizz Hornkamp (from Den Bosch) |
| 19 | MF | ENG | Daniel Crowley (from (England) Cheltenham Town) |
| 29 | MF | NED | Thijs Oosting (from AZ) |

Out:

| No. | Pos. | Nation | Player |
|---|---|---|---|
| 1 | GK | NED | Robbin Ruiter (free agent) |
| 9 | FW | GHA | Kwasi Okyere Wriedt (to (Germany) Holstein Kiel) |
| 19 | FW | GER | John Yeboah (on loan to (Germany) MSV Duisburg) |

=== RKC Waalwijk ===
In:

| No. | Pos. | Nation | Player |
|---|---|---|---|
| 13 | GK | NED | Mark Spenkelink (from (Georgia (country)) Locomotive Tbilisi) |
| 17 | FW | NED | Roy Kuijpers (from Den Bosch) |

Out:

| No. | Pos. | Nation | Player |
|---|---|---|---|
| 13 | GK | BEL | Jens Teunckens (to (Belgium) Lierse) |

=== Cambuur ===
In:

| No. | Pos. | Nation | Player |
|---|---|---|---|
| 11 | FW | NED | Patrick Joosten (on loan from Groningen) |
| 27 | DF | NED | Sekou Sylla (from TOP Oss) |

Out:

| No. | Pos. | Nation | Player |
|---|---|---|---|
| 19 | FW | NED | Sam Hendriks (on loan to De Graafschap) |
| 30 | MF | BUL | Filip Krastev (loan return to (Belgium) Lommel) |

=== Go Ahead Eagles ===
In:

| No. | Pos. | Nation | Player |
|---|---|---|---|
| 15 | DF | CUW | Cuco Martina (free agent) |
| 28 | DF | GRE | Aventis Aventisian (from (Greece) PAOK B) |
| 33 | GK | NED | Nick Hengelman (from (Bulgaria) Pirin Blagoevgrad) |
| 37 | MF | NED | Evert Linthorst (from (United Arab Emirates) Al-Ittihad Kalba) |

Out:

| No. | Pos. | Nation | Player |
|---|---|---|---|
| 1 | FW | SUR | Warner Hahn (free agent) |
| 24 | MF | COM | Yacine Bourhane (to (Denmark) Esbjerg fB) |

=== NEC ===
In:

| No. | Pos. | Nation | Player |
|---|---|---|---|
| 12 | FW | CIV | Wilfried Bony (free agent) |

Out:

| No. | Pos. | Nation | Player |
|---|---|---|---|
| 17 | FW | NED | Ole Romeny (to Emmen) |
| 23 | MF | NED | Thomas Beekman (on loan to Helmond Sport) |
