= 2020–21 Fortuna Sittard season =

Fortuna Sittard
2020–21 season
- Chairman: Özgür Işıtan Gün
- Manager: Kevin Hofland
- Stadium: Fortuna Sittard Stadion
- Eredivisie: 11th
- KNVB Cup: Round of 16
- Top goalscorer: League: Zian Flemming (12); All: Zian Flemming (15)
Home colours	Away colours	Third colours

The 2020–21 season was the 53rd season in existence of Fortuna Sittard and the club's third consecutive season in the top flight of Dutch football. In addition to the domestic league, Fortuna Sittard participated in this season's edition of the KNVB Cup. The season covered the period from 1 July 2020 to 30 June 2021.

== Players ==
=== First-team squad ===
Note: Flags indicate national team as defined under FIFA eligibility rules; some limited exceptions apply. Players may hold more than one non-FIFA nationality.

No.	Pos.	Nation	Player
1	GK	NED	Yanick van Osch
2	DF	SUI	Martin Angha
4	DF	BEL	Dario Van den Buijs (on loan from Beerschot)
5	DF	NED	Roel Janssen
7	MF	CPV	Lisandro Semedo
8	FW	NED	Zian Flemming
9	FW	GER	Sebastian Polter
10	MF	NED	Mats Seuntjens
11	FW	SWE	Emil Hansson
12	DF	NED	Clint Essers
14	MF	SWE	Tesfaldet Tekie
17	FW	GRE	Dimitrios Emmanouilidis (on loan from Panathinaikos)
18	DF	NED	Mike van Beijnen
20	FW	NED	Arian Kastrati

No.	Pos.	Nation	Player
21	DF	FRA	Grégoire Amiot
23	MF	NED	Ben Rienstra (captain)
24	MF	MAR	Nassim El Ablak
25	DF	BEL	Mickaël Tirpan (on loan from Kasımpaşa)
27	MF	COD	Samuel Moutoussamy (on loan from Nantes)
28	MF	IRL	Ryan Johansson (on loan from Sevilla FC)
33	FW	NED	Leroy George
35	DF	ENG	George Cox
40	GK	GER	Joshua Wehking
41	GK	NED	Tom Hendriks
44	DF	GRE	Lazaros Rota
55	MF	BEL	Thibaud Verlinden
77	GK	MDA	Alexei Koșelev
—	FW	ENG	Veron Parkes

=== Out on loan ===
Note: Flags indicate national team as defined under FIFA eligibility rules; some limited exceptions apply. Players may hold more than one non-FIFA nationality.

No.	Pos.	Nation	Player
—	MF	GER	Dimitrios Ioannidis (at Sportfreunde Lotte until 30 June 2021)
—	FW	FIN	Rasmus Karjalainen (at Örebro until 30 June 2021)
—	DF	NED	Özgür Aktaş (at FC Dordrecht until 30 June 2021)
—	FW	BEL	Jacky Donkor (at FC Eindhoven until 30 June 2021)
—	FW	FRA	Djibril Dianessy (at MVV Maastricht until 30 June 2021)

No.	Pos.	Nation	Player
—	MF	BEL	Adnan Ugur (at FC Dordrecht until 30 June 2021)
—	MF	NED	Richie Musaba (at FC Dordrecht until 30 June 2021)
—	FW	POR	André Vidigal (at G.D. Estoril Praia until 30 June 2021)
—	FW	GER	Bassala Sambou (at Randers FC until 30 June 2021)

== Pre-season and friendlies ==
Win Draw Loss

25 July 2020 Friendly	Fortuna Sittard (Netherlands)	2–1	(Netherlands) FC Dordrecht	Sittard, Netherlands
14:00 CEST (UTC+2)	Sambou 30'; Niňaj 59'	Report	Agrafiotis 70'	Stadium: Fortuna Sittard Stadion

10 August 2020 Friendly	FC Twente (Netherlands)	2–1	(Netherlands) Fortuna Sittard	Enschede, Netherlands
18:45 CEST (UTC+2)	Aburjania 49'; Rots 57'	Report	Angha 76'	Stadium: De Grolsch Veste; Attendance: 3,025; Referee: Jochem Kamphuis

20 August 2020 Friendly	AZ (Netherlands)	Cancelled	(Netherlands) Fortuna Sittard	Alkmaar, Netherlands
16:30 CEST (UTC+2)				Stadium: AFAS Stadion

26 August 2020 Friendly	Fortuna Sittard (Netherlands)	2–1	(Netherlands) VVV-Venlo	Sittard, Netherlands
14:10 CEST (UTC+2)	Polter 32'; Rota 38'	Report	Van Crooij 36'	Stadium: Fortuna Sittard Stadion

== Competitions ==
=== Overview ===
Competition	First match	Last match	Starting round	Final position	Record							
Competition	First match	Last match	Starting round	Final position	Pld	W	D	L	GF	GA	GD	Win %
Eredivisie	12 September 2020	16 May 2021	Matchday 1	11th	34	12	5	17	50	58	−8	35.29
KNVB Cup	28 October 2020	21 January 2021	First round	Round of 16	2	1	0	1	4	3	+1	50.00
Total					36	13	5	18	54	61	−7	36.11

Source: Soccerway

=== Eredivisie ===
==== League table ====
Pos	Team	Pld	W	D	L	GF	GA	GD	Pts
9	Heracles Almelo	34	12	8	14	42	53	−11	44
10	Twente	34	10	11	13	48	50	−2	41
11	Fortuna Sittard	34	12	5	17	50	58	−8	41
12	Heerenveen	34	9	12	13	43	49	−6	39
13	PEC Zwolle	34	9	11	14	44	53	−9	38

Source: Eredivisie, Soccerway
Rules for classification: Season in progress: 1) Most points won; 2) Less points lost; 3) Goal difference; 4) Goals scored; 5) Alphabetical order; End of season: 1) Points; 2) Goal difference; 3) Goals scored; 4) Head-to-head points; 5) Head-to-head goal difference; 6) Head-to-head away goals scored; 7) Play-off if relevant for deciding champion, relegation or participating in a European league, otherwise by draw. 8) Penalty shoot-out (only after a play-off)

==== Results summary ====
Overall								Home						Away					
Pld	W	D	L	GF	GA	GD	Pts	W	D	L	GF	GA	GD	W	D	L	GF	GA	GD
34	12	5	17	50	58	−8	41	5	3	9	27	33	−6	7	2	8	23	25	−2

Source: Eredivisie

==== Results by round ====
Round	1	2	3	4	5	6	7	8	9	10	11	12	13	14	15	16	17	18	19	20	21	22	23	24	25	26	27	28	29	30	31	32	33	34
Ground	A	H	H	A	A	H	A	H	H	A	H	A	A	H	A	H	A	H	A	H	H	A	H	A	H	A	H	A	H	A	H	A	H	A
Result	L	L	D	L	D	L	L	D	L	L	W	W	D	W	W	L	W	L	W	W	L	W	W	L	L	W	L	L	L	W	W	L	D	L
Position	16	17	17	16	16	17	18	18	18	17	16	14	14	13	12	13	11	13	12	10	10	10	9	9	11	10	11	12	12	12	10	10	10	11

Source: Eredivisie
A = Away; H = Home; W = Win; D = Draw; L = Loss

==== Matches ====
The league fixtures were announced on 24 July 2020.

12 September 2020 1	FC Twente	2–0	Fortuna Sittard	Enschede
21:00 CEST (UTC+2)	Menig 10', (yellow card) 67'; Pereira 51' (pen.)	Report		Stadium: De Grolsch Veste; Attendance: 8,000; Referee: Allard Lindhout

19 September 2020 2	Fortuna Sittard	1–3	SC Heerenveen	Sittard
21:00 CEST (UTC+2)	Janssen (yellow card) 62'; Niňaj (yellow card) 69'; Rota (yellow card) 72'; Polter 73'; Flemming (yellow card) 87'	Report	Batista Meier 15'; J. Veerman 29' (pen.); H. Veerman 34'	Stadium: Fortuna Sittard Stadion; Attendance: 2,825; Referee: Martín Pérez

26 September 2020 3	Fortuna Sittard	3–3	AZ	Sittard
18:45 CEST (UTC+2)	Flemming 9', 90+6'; Hansson 79'; Rota (yellow card) 87'; Smeets (yellow card) 90+5'	Report	De Wit 23'; Chatzidiakos (yellow card) 37'; Koopmeiners 52'; Boadu 69'	Stadium: Fortuna Sittard Stadion; Attendance: 3,000; Referee: Björn Kuipers

4 October 2020 4	PSV	2–0	Fortuna Sittard	Eindhoven
16:45 CEST (UTC+2)	Malen 5'; Madueke 85'	Report	Seuntjens (yellow card) 42'	Stadium: Philips Stadion; Attendance: 0 Referee: Jeroen Manschot

18 October 2020 5	FC Emmen	2–2	Fortuna Sittard	Emmen
14:30 CEST (UTC+2)	Laursen 51'; De Leeuw 60'; Tibbling (yellow card) 73'; Peña (yellow card) 85'	Report	Polter 18'; Semedo 23'; Seuntjens (yellow card) 79'	Stadium: De Oude Meerdijk; Attendance: 0 Referee: Serdar Gözübüyük

25 October 2020 6	Fortuna Sittard	1–3	FC Groningen	Sittard
12:15 CET (UTC+1)	Tekie (yellow card) 25'; Seuntjens 54' (pen.)	Report	Larsen 6', 28'; Dammers (yellow card) 52'; Van Hintum 79'	Stadium: Fortuna Sittard Stadion; Attendance: 0 Referee: Pol van Boekel

31 October 2020 7	Ajax	5–2	Fortuna Sittard	Amsterdam
20:00 CET (UTC+1)	Klaassen 32', 45'; Brobbey 74'; Tadić 86' (pen.); Promes 90+5' (pen.)	Report	Cox 7', 90+6'; Angha (yellow card) 85'	Stadium: Johan Cruyff Arena; Attendance: 0 Referee: Siemen Mulder

6 November 2020 8	Fortuna Sittard	2–2	PEC Zwolle	Sittard
20:00 CET (UTC+1)	Hansson 6'; Cox 46'	Report	Jach 33'; Lam 54'	Stadium: Fortuna Sittard Stadion; Attendance: 0 Referee: Edwin van de Graaf

22 November 2020 9	Fortuna Sittard	1–3	Feyenoord	Sittard
14:30 CET (UTC+1)	Flemming 1'	Report	Senesi 34'; Berghuis 45+1' (pen.), 90+1' (pen.)	Stadium: Fortuna Sittard Stadion; Attendance: 0 Referee: Dennis Higler

29 November 2020 10	Vitesse	2–0	Fortuna Sittard	Arnhem
12:15 CET (UTC+1)	Darfalou 72'; Broja 83'	Report	Janssen (yellow card) 67'; Jach (yellow card) 82'; Rienstra (yellow card) 90+2'	Stadium: GelreDome; Attendance: 0 Referee: Jochem Kamphuis

5 December 2020 11	Fortuna Sittard	3–2	Willem II	Sittard
18:45 CET (UTC+1)	Semedo 9'; Polter 29' (pen.); Rota (yellow card) 33'; Flemming 44'	Report	Köhn (yellow card) 50'; Pavlidis (yellow card) 61', (goal) 66'; Heerkens (yellow card) 63'; Llonch (yellow card) 75' (yellow-red card) 88'; Van der Heijden 87'	Stadium: Fortuna Sittard Stadion; Attendance: 0 Referee: Kevin Blom

11 December 2020 12	Heracles Almelo	1–2	Fortuna Sittard	Almelo
20:00 CET (UTC+1)	Burgzorg (yellow card) 57', (goal) 90+3'	Report	Rente 31' (o.g.); Cox (yellow card) 34'; Seuntjens (yellow card) 45+3'; Rota (yellow card) 52'; Polter 60'; Van Osch (yellow card) 76'	Stadium: Erve Asito; Attendance: 0 Referee: Erwin Blank

19 December 2020 13	FC Utrecht	1–1	Fortuna Sittard	Utrecht
21:00 CET (UTC+1)	Mahi 52'; Kerk (yellow card) 82'	Report	Polter 63', (yellow card) 90+1'; Angha (yellow card) 86'	Stadium: Stadion Galgenwaard; Attendance: 0 Referee: Rob Dieperink

22 December 2020 14	Fortuna Sittard	2–1	RKC Waalwijk	Sittard
16:30 CET (UTC+1)	Seuntjens (yellow card) 9'; Polter 45'; Janssen (yellow card) 56'; Semedo 90+2', (yellow card) 90+2'	Report	Stokkers 15'; Lamprou (yellow card) 45+3'	Stadium: Fortuna Sittard Stadion; Attendance: 0 Referee: Marc Nagtegaal

10 January 2021 15	SC Heerenveen	1–3	Fortuna Sittard	Heerenveen
14:30 CET (UTC+1)	H. Veerman 72'	Report	Rienstra 20'; Cox 24'; Flemming 37'	Stadium: Abe Lenstra Stadion; Attendance: 0 Referee: Richard Martens

13 January 2021 16	Fortuna Sittard	0–1	Sparta Rotterdam	Sittard
20:00 CET (UTC+1)		Report	Thy 57'	Stadium: Fortuna Sittard Stadion; Attendance: 0 Referee: Allard Lindhout

16 January 2021 17	PEC Zwolle	0–2	Fortuna Sittard	Zwolle
20:00 CET (UTC+1)		Report	Flemming 57'; Seuntjens 89'	Stadium: MAC³PARK Stadion; Attendance: 0 Referee: Christiaan Bax

24 January 2021 18	Fortuna Sittard	1–2	Ajax	Sittard
12:15 CET (UTC+1)	Tirpan 48'; Polter (red card) 90+3'	Report	Polter 19' (o.g.); Tagliafico (yellow card) 45+2'; Haller 64'; Neres (yellow card) 90+6'	Stadium: Fortuna Sittard Stadion; Attendance: 0 Referee: Dennis Higler

27 January 2021 19	RKC Waalwijk	1–2	Fortuna Sittard	Waalwijk
20:00 CET (UTC+1)	Min 84'; Meulensteen (yellow card) 89'	Report	Seuntjens 54'; Semedo 63'; Rienstra (yellow card) 66'	Stadium: Mandemakers Stadion; Attendance: 0 Referee: Laurens Gerrets

30 January 2021 20	Fortuna Sittard	3–2	VVV-Venlo	Sittard
20:00 CET (UTC+1)	Angha (yellow card) 25'; Flemming 33'; Seuntjens 58' (pen.); Janssen (yellow card) 67'; Rienstra 90'	Report	Kirschbaum (yellow card) 33'; Giakoumakis (yellow card) 45+1', (goal) 63'; Da Graca (yellow card) 56'; Hunte 90+2'	Stadium: Fortuna Sittard Stadion; Attendance: 0 Referee: Serdar Gözübüyük

5 February 2021 21	Fortuna Sittard	0–1	Heracles Almelo	Sittard
20:00 CET (UTC+1)		Report	Vloet 38'	Stadium: Fortuna Sittard Stadion; Attendance: 0 Referee: Martin Pérez

13 February 2021 22	Sparta Rotterdam	1–2	Fortuna Sittard	Rotterdam
14:15 CET (UTC+1)	Gravenberch (yellow card) 2', (goal) 31'; Beugelsdijk (yellow card) 80'	Report	Semedo 23', (yellow card) 90'; Polter 50'; Flemming (yellow card) 88'	Stadium: Het Kasteel; Attendance: 0 Referee: Martin van den Kerkhof

20 February 2021 23	Fortuna Sittard	2–0	ADO Den Haag	Sittard
21:00 CET (UTC+1)	Semedo 26'; Polter 79'	Report	Van Ewijk (yellow card) 65'	Stadium: Fortuna Sittard Stadion; Attendance: 0 Referee: Bas Nijhuis

28 February 2021 24	FC Groningen	1–0	Fortuna Sittard	Groningen
14:30 CET (UTC+1)	El Hankouri (yellow card) 29'; Schreck (yellow card) 34'; Abraham 50'; Dammers (yellow card) 90+2'	Report		Stadium: Euroborg; Attendance: 0 Referee: Jannick van der Laan

7 March 2021 25	Fortuna Sittard	1–3	PSV	Sittard
14:30 CET (UTC+1)	Cox 69'	Report	Zahavi 10', 27'; Viergever (yellow card) 35'; Sangaré (yellow card) 43'; Madueke 87'	Stadium: Fortuna Sittard Stadion; Attendance: 0 Referee: Allard Lindhout

14 March 2021 26	VVV-Venlo	1–3	Fortuna Sittard	Venlo
12:15 CET (UTC+1)	Giakoumakis (yellow card) 46', (goal) 54'; Post (yellow card) 78'; Arias (yellow card) 90+2'	Report	Semedo 10'; Seuntjens 59', (yellow card) 90'; Flemming 66'	Stadium: De Koel; Attendance: 0 Referee: Siemen Mulder

20 March 2021 27	Fortuna Sittard	0–1	FC Utrecht	Sittard
16:30 CET (UTC+1)		Report	Dalmau 81'	Stadium: Fortuna Sittard Stadion; Attendance: 0 Referee: Björn Kuipers

4 April 2021 28	Feyenoord	2–0	Fortuna Sittard	Rotterdam
12:15 CEST (UTC+2)	Linssen 50'; Berghuis 83'	Report		Stadium: De Kuip; Attendance: 0 Referee: Allard Lindhout

10 April 2021 29	Fortuna Sittard	1–3	FC Emmen	Sittard
20:00 CEST (UTC+2)	Janssen (red card) 50'; Angha (yellow card) 54'; Van den Buijs (yellow card) 73'; Emmanouilidis 85'	Report	Peña 53' (pen.); Bijl 89' (pen.); Gladon 90+7'	Stadium: Fortuna Sittard Stadion; Attendance: 0 Referee: Joey Kooij

25 April 2021 30	ADO Den Haag	0–3	Fortuna Sittard	The Hague
14:30 CEST (UTC+2)	Vejinović (yellow card) 61'	Report	Cox (yellow card) 30'; Flemming 39'; Polter 48'; Tekie 77'	Stadium: Cars Jeans Stadion; Attendance: 939; Referee: Bas Nijhuis

1 May 2021 31	Fortuna Sittard	3–0	FC Twente	Sittard
18:45 CEST (UTC+2)	Semedo 25', 74'; Seuntjens 63' (pen.)	Report	Brama (yellow card) 62'; Markelo (yellow card) 90'	Stadium: Fortuna Sittard Stadion; Attendance: 0 Referee: Laurens Gerrets

8 May 2021 32	AZ	1–0	Fortuna Sittard	Alkmaar
20:00 CEST (UTC+2)	Guðmundsson 29' (pen.); Aboukhlal (yellow card) 31'; Leeuwin (red card) 49'; Bizot (yellow card) 90+3'; Midtsjø (yellow card) 90+5'	Report	Van Osch (yellow card) 27'	Stadium: AFAS Stadion; Attendance: 0 Referee: Edwin van de Graaf

13 May 2021 33	Fortuna Sittard	3–3	Vitesse	Sittard
14:30 CEST (UTC+2)	Rienstra 1'; Flemming 41', 54'; Rota (yellow card) 67'	Report	Tronstad 25'; Bazoer 30', (yellow card) 64'; Openda 90+4'	Stadium: Fortuna Sittard Stadion; Attendance: 0 Referee: Marc Nagtegaal

16 May 2021 34	Willem II	2–1	Fortuna Sittard	Tilburg
14:30 CEST (UTC+2)	Llonch (yellow card) 39'; Pavlidis 45', (yellow card) 57'; Holmén 67'	Report	Flemming (yellow card) 45+2', (goal) 48'	Stadium: Koning Willem II Stadion; Attendance: 0 Referee: Allard Lindhout

=== KNVB Cup ===
28 October 2020 First round	Roda JC Kerkrade	0–2	Fortuna Sittard	Kerkrade
21:00 CET (UTC+1)		Report	Polter 8' (pen.); Flemming 11'	Stadium: Parkstad Limburg Stadion; Attendance: 0 Referee: Edwin van de Graaf

21 January 2021 Round of 16	NEC Nijmegen	3–2 (a.e.t.)	Fortuna Sittard	Nijmegen
18:45 CET (UTC+1)	Janga 64'; Bruijn 97' (pen.); Beekman 102'	Report	Flemming 60', 103'	Stadium: Stadion de Goffert; Attendance: 0 Referee: Kevin Blom
