= 2022–23 Fortuna Sittard season =

Fortuna Sittard
2022–23 season
- Owner: Özgür Işıtan Gün
- Chairman: Özgür Işıtan Gün
- Head coach: Sjors Ultee (until 22 August); Julio Velázquez (from 12 September)
- Stadium: Fortuna Sittard Stadion
- Eredivisie: 13th
- KNVB Cup: First round
- Top goalscorer: League: Burak Yılmaz (9); All: Burak Yılmaz (9)

The 2022–23 season was the 55th season in the existence of Fortuna Sittard and the club's fifth consecutive season in the top flight of Dutch football. In addition to the domestic league, Fortuna Sittard participated in this season's edition of the KNVB Cup.

== Players ==
As of 17 January 2023

Note: Flags indicate national team as defined under FIFA eligibility rules; some limited exceptions apply. Players may hold more than one non-FIFA nationality.

No.	Pos.	Nation	Player
1	GK	NED	Yanick van Osch
2	DF	ESP	Ximo Navarro
4	DF	NED	Roel Janssen
5	DF	ENG	George Cox
6	MF	CPV	Deroy Duarte
7	FW	ESP	Iñigo Córdoba
8	MF	CRO	Kristijan Bistrović (on loan from CSKA Moscow)
11	FW	NED	Paul Gladon
12	DF	POR	Ivo Pinto
14	DF	BRA	Rodrigo Guth
15	MF	TUR	Oğuzhan Özyakup
17	FW	TUR	Burak Yılmaz (captain)
18	DF	NED	Mike van Beijnen

No.	Pos.	Nation	Player
19	MF	KOS	Arianit Ferati
21	MF	TUR	Doğan Erdoğan
22	GK	NED	Tom Hendriks
28	DF	NED	Bryant Nieling
29	FW	NED	Thomas Buitink (on loan from Vitesse)
31	GK	CRO	Ivor Pandur (on loan from Hellas Verona)
33	DF	GRE	Dimitrios Siovas
34	FW	TUR	Tunahan Taşçı
55	DF	CRO	Stipe Radić
61	DF	MAD	Rémy Vita
74	FW	ITA	Gianmarco Cangiano (on loan from Bologna)
77	FW	NED	Tijjani Noslin
85	FW	POR	Umaro Embaló

=== Out on loan ===
Note: Flags indicate national team as defined under FIFA eligibility rules; some limited exceptions apply. Players may hold more than one non-FIFA nationality.

No. / Pos. / Nation / Player; — / GK / NED / Michael Verrips (at FC Groningen until 30 June 2023)	No. / Pos. / Nation / Player; — / MF / NED / Richie Musaba (at TOP Oss until 30 June 2023)

== Transfers ==
=== In ===
No.	Pos	Player	Transferred from	Fee	Date	Source
17	FW	(Turkey) Burak Yılmaz	(France) Lille		1 July 2022	
90	MF	(Greece) Vasilios Sourlis	(Greece) Olympiacos		7 July 2022	
7	FW	(Spain) Iñigo Córdoba	(Spain) Athletic Bilbao		22 July 2022	

== Pre-season and friendlies ==
Win Draw Loss

2 July 2022 Friendly	Fortuna Sittard (Netherlands)	2–3	(Germany) Viktoria Köln	Nederweert-Eind, Netherlands
14:00 CEST (UTC+2)				Stadium: Sportpark Op de Hooven

6 July 2022 Friendly	Fortuna Sittard (Netherlands)	1–1	(Germany) VfL Bochum	Nederweert-Eind, Netherlands
18:00 CEST (UTC+2)	Noslin 23'		Stöger 77'	Stadium: Sportpark Op de Hooven

9 July 2022 Friendly	OH Leuven (Belgium)	1–1	(Netherlands) Fortuna Sittard	Nederweert-Eind, Netherlands
17:00 CEST (UTC+2)				Stadium: Sportpark Op de Hooven

22 July 2022 Friendly	Fortuna Sittard (Netherlands)	3–3	(Ukraine) Shakhtar Donetsk	Vlaardingen, Netherlands
18:30 CEST (UTC+2)				Stadium: Sportpark 't Nieuwelant

5 December 2022 Friendly	Adana Demirspor (Turkey)	1–2	(Netherlands) Fortuna Sittard	Antalya, Turkey
13:30 TRT (UTC+3)	Onyekuru 28'		Gladon 8'; Embaló 38'	Stadium: Mardan Sports Complex

8 December 2022 Friendly	Fortuna Sittard (Netherlands)	0–3	(Scotland) Livingston	Antalya, Turkey
16:00 TRT (UTC+3)				Stadium: Mardan Sports Complex

22 December 2022 Friendly	MSV Duisburg (Germany)	1–1	(Netherlands) Fortuna Sittard	Duisburg, Germany
16:00 CET (UTC+1)	Girth 80'		Cissé 90'	Stadium: Westender Straße; Attendance: 0

== Competitions ==
=== Overall record ===
Competition	First match	Last match	Starting round	Final position	Record							
Competition	First match	Last match	Starting round	Final position	Pld	W	D	L	GF	GA	GD	Win %
Eredivisie	6 August 2022	28 May 2023	Matchday 1	13th	34	10	6	18	39	62	−23	29.41
KNVB Cup	19 October 2022		First round	First round	1	0	0	1	2	3	−1	0.00
Total					35	10	6	19	41	65	−24	28.57

Source: Soccerway

=== Eredivisie ===
==== League table ====
Pos	Team	Pld	W	D	L	GF	GA	GD	Pts
11	Go Ahead Eagles	34	10	10	14	46	56	−10	40
12	NEC	34	8	15	11	42	45	−3	39
13	Fortuna Sittard	34	10	6	18	39	62	−23	36
14	Volendam	34	10	6	18	42	71	−29	36
15	Excelsior	34	9	5	20	32	71	−39	32

Source: Eredivisie
Rules for classification: Season in progress: 1) Most points won; 2) Less points lost; 3) Goal difference; 4) Goals scored; 5) Alphabetical order; End of season: 1) Points; 2) Goal difference; 3) Goals scored; 4) Head-to-head points; 5) Head-to-head goal difference; 6) Head-to-head away goals scored; 7) Play-off if relevant for deciding champion, relegation or participating in a European league, otherwise by draw. 8) Penalty shoot-out (only after a play-off)

==== Results summary ====
Overall								Home						Away					
Pld	W	D	L	GF	GA	GD	Pts	W	D	L	GF	GA	GD	W	D	L	GF	GA	GD
34	10	6	18	39	62	−23	36	5	4	8	21	28	−7	5	2	10	18	34	−16

Source: Eredivisie

==== Results by round ====
Round	1	2	3	4	5	6	7	8	9	10	11	12	13	14	15	16	17	18	19	20	21	22	23	24	25	26	27	28	29	30	31	32	33	34
Ground	H	A	H	A	H	A	H	H	A	H	A	A	H	A	H	H	A	H	A	H	A	A	H	A	H	A	H	A	H	A	H	A	A	H
Result	L	L	L	L	L	D	W	W	W	D	D	L	L	W	L	D	L	W	W	D	W	L	L	W	L	L	W	L	L	L	W	L	L	D
Position	13	16	17	18	18	18	16	14	11	10	11	12	13	12	13	12	13	12	11	11	10	11	12	11	12	12	12	12	12	12	12	13	13	13

Source: Eredivisie
A = Away; H = Home; W = Win; D = Draw; L = Loss

==== Matches ====
The league fixtures were announced on 17 June 2022.

=== KNVB Cup ===
19 October 2022 First round	NEC	3–2	Fortuna Sittard	Nijmegen
21:00 CEST	Navarro 35' (o.g.); El Karouani 47'; Marques 74'	Report	11' Bassett; 61' Guth	Stadium: Goffertstadion
