= Umaro Embaló =

Cuba footballer (born 2001)

Saico Úmaro Embaló
Personal information
- Date of birth: 6 May 2001 (age 25)
- Place of birth: Bissau, Guinea-Bissau
- Height: 1.70 m (5 ft 7 in)
- Position: Winger

Team information
- Current team: Kustošija

Youth career
- 2014–2015: AD Oeiras
- 2015–2020: Benfica

Senior career*
Years	Team	Apps	(Gls)
2018–2022	Benfica B	59	(6)
2022–2025	Fortuna Sittard	29	(3)
2023–2024	→ Cartagena (loan)	16	(0)
2024	→ Rio Ave (loan)	14	(5)
2025	→ Vitória de Guimarães (loan)	7	(2)
2026–	Kustošija	0	(0)

International career^{‡}
2015–2016	Portugal U16	12	(6)
2016–2018	Portugal U17	27	(16)
2019	Portugal U18	3	(1)
2018–2019	Portugal U19	13	(4)
- * Club domestic league appearances and goals as of 13 March 2026 ‡ National team caps and goals as of 17 October 2019

Saico Úmaro Embaló (born 6 May 2001) is a professional footballer who plays as a winger for Druga NL club Kustošija. Born in Guinea-Bissau, he was a youth international for Portugal.

== Club career ==
=== Benfica ===
Embaló progressed through Benfica's youth academy, after being scouted AD Oeiras in 2015. On 12 September 2017, Embaló made his debut for the under-19 team in the UEFA Youth League in a 5–1 home victory against CSKA Moscow, replacing Jota in the 75th minute and scoring the final goal of the game in the 89th minute.

On 27 October 2018, he made his debut for Benfica's reserves in the Segunda Liga, coming on as a late substitute for Chris Willock in a 3–2 home win against Sporting da Covilhã. In the 2018–19 season, he appeared in all six games with the under-19 team in the UEFA Youth League, scoring once and reaching the knockout stage, where they eventually lost to Montpellier. He made three appearances for the reserves in the second division that season.

Embaló scored his first Segunda Liga goal on 11 August 2019 against Estoril, catching opposing goalkeeper António Filipe on the wrong foot with a misplaced cross which sailed into the top corner, to secure a 2–1 victory. He played in nine games in the second division and scored twice that season, before it was abandoned due to the COVID-19 pandemic in Portugal. In the UEFA Youth League, the team made it to the final after defeating Dinamo Zagreb (3–1) and Ajax (3–0). However, Benfica lost 3–2 to Real Madrid's under-19s in the final in which Embaló started, despite Gonçalo Ramos' brace. Embaló made seven appearances and scored three goals in the Youth League that season.

In the 2020–21 season, he missed the entire first half of the season due to various reasons, including testing positive for COVID-19. In the second half of the season, he made sixteen appearances. During his time at Benfica, he was reported to having received interest by Real Madrid, Manchester United, RB Leipzig and PSV Eindhoven, but a move failed to come to fruition.

=== Fortuna Sittard ===
In August 2022, Embaló signed a four-year contract with Eredivisie club Fortuna Sittard for a fee reported to be in the region of €1 million with a 50% sell-on clause. He made his debut for the club on 17 September in a 1–0 league victory against Excelsior, replacing Tijjani Noslin in the 55th minute. On 2 October, he scored on his first ever start for Fortuna, curling a strike from distance into the top corner in a 2–0 Eredivisie win over Volendam.

On 29 August 2023, Embaló was loaned to Spanish Segunda División side Cartagena for the 2023–24 season. On 31 January 2024, he moved on a new loan to Rio Ave. One year later, on 28 January 2025, he signed a half-season loan deal with Vitória S.C. In April 2025, he was banned from playing after testing positive for an illegal substance. His contract with Fortuna was subsequently terminated by mutual consent.

== Career statistics ==
As of match played 21 May 2023

Appearances and goals by club, season and competition
Club	Season	League			KNVB Cup		Europe		Other		Total	
Club	Season	Division	Apps	Goals	Apps	Goals	Apps	Goals	Apps	Goals	Apps	Goals
Benfica B	2018–19	LigaPro	3	0	—		—		—		3	0
Benfica B	2019–20	LigaPro	9	2	—		—		—		9	2
Benfica B	2020–21	LigaPro	16	0	—		—		—		16	0
Benfica B	2021–22	LigaPro	31	4	—		—		—		31	4
Benfica B	Total		59	6	—		—		—		59	6
Fortuna Sittard	2022–23	Eredivisie	26	3	1	0	—		—		27	3
Career total			85	9	1	0	0	0	0	0	86	9

== Honours ==
Benfica U19

- Campeonato Nacional de Juniores: 2017–18
- UEFA Youth League runner-up: 2019–20
