= Ivo Pinto =

Portuguese footballer (born 1990)

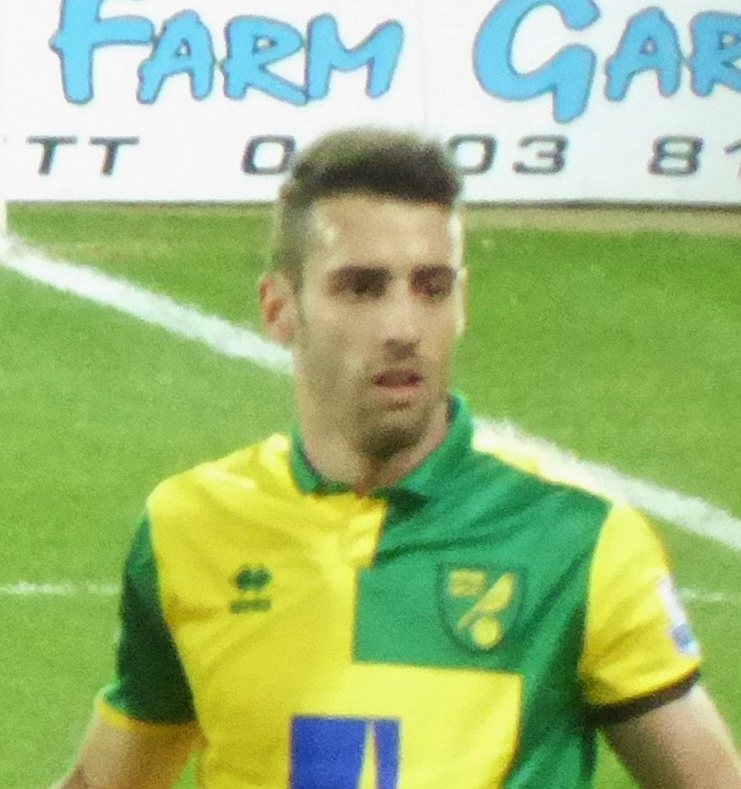
- Pinto with Norwich City in 2016

Personal information
- Full name: Ivo Daniel Ferreira Mendonça Pinto
- Date of birth: 7 January 1990 (age 36)
- Place of birth: Lourosa, Portugal
- Height: 1.82 m (6 ft 0 in)
- Position: Right-back

Team information
- Current team: Fortuna Sittard
- Number: 12

Youth career
- 1998–2000: Lusitânia
- 2001–2005: Boavista
- 2005–2006: Pasteleira
- 2006–2008: Boavista
- 2008–2009: Porto

Senior career*
Years	Team	Apps	(Gls)
2009–2011	Porto	0	(0)
2009	→ Gil Vicente (loan)	1	(0)
2009–2010	→ Vitória Setúbal (loan)	3	(0)
2010–2011	→ Covilhã (loan)	22	(0)
2011–2012	Rio Ave	0	(0)
2011–2012	→ União Leiria (loan)	25	(0)
2012–2013	CFR Cluj	27	(0)
2013–2016	Dinamo Zagreb	70	(0)
2016–2019	Norwich City	85	(3)
2019–2022	Dinamo Zagreb	6	(0)
2020	→ Famalicão (loan)	15	(0)
2020–2021	→ Rio Ave (loan)	26	(0)
2021–2022	→ Fortuna Sittard (loan)	22	(0)
2022–	Fortuna Sittard	128	(0)

International career
2005	Portugal U16	2	(0)
2006–2007	Portugal U17	12	(0)
2007–2008	Portugal U18	3	(0)
2008–2009	Portugal U19	11	(0)
2011–2012	Portugal U21	6	(0)
- * Club domestic league appearances and goals as of 10:03, 12 October 2026 (UTC)

Ivo Daniel Ferreira Mendonça Pinto (born 7 January 1990) is a Portuguese professional footballer who plays as a right-back for Eredivisie club Fortuna Sittard.

Brought up at Porto, he spent most of his career abroad, playing professionally in Romania, Croatia, England and the Netherlands. He won several domestic honours with Dinamo Zagreb.

== Club career ==
=== Portugal ===
Born in Lourosa (Santa Maria da Feira), Pinto played youth football for three clubs, including six years with Boavista FC. In 2008, he joined neighbouring FC Porto, where he turned professional.

Pinto did not appear for Porto in the Primeira Liga, featuring as an unused substitute in two games. His only competitive appearance for the first team took place on 4 February 2009, when he replaced Andrés Madrid in the 88th minute of a 4–1 away loss against Sporting CP in the semi-finals of the Taça da Liga.

Pinto was consecutively loaned for the duration of his contract, to Gil Vicente FC, Vitória F.C. and S.C. Covilhã. He made his first top-division appearance with the second club, playing five minutes in a 2–0 defeat at precisely Porto on 13 December 2009.

In the summer of 2011, Pinto was bought by Rio Ave F.C. but never represented the team, being immediately loaned to U.D. Leiria also of the top tier. He started regularly for the side, but the season ended in relegation.

=== Cluj ===
Pinto spent the next few years in eastern Europe, first with CFR Cluj in Romania. His first competitive match took place on 14 July 2012, as he featured the full 120 minutes in a penalty shootout loss to FC Dinamo București for the Supercupa României (2–2 in regulation time). His debut in Liga I occurred seven days later, and he again started in a 1–1 home draw against CS Gaz Metan Mediaș.

Pinto made his debut in the UEFA Champions League on 1 August 2012, playing the entirety of the 1–0 win over FC Slovan Liberec. He appeared in every group stage game, with the team finishing third and moving to the UEFA Europa League.

=== Dinamo Zagreb ===
On 30 June 2013, Pinto signed a four-year deal with Croatian club GNK Dinamo Zagreb for a reported fee of €3 million. Upon his arrival, he stated he was aware of all the goals and ready to accept the challenge.

Pinto's maiden appearance in the Prva HNL occurred on 12 July 2013, in a 3–1 victory against NK Osijek where he replaced Jerko Leko at half-time. During his two-and-a-half-year tenure, he played 112 matches across all competitions and won the national championship three times.

=== Norwich City ===
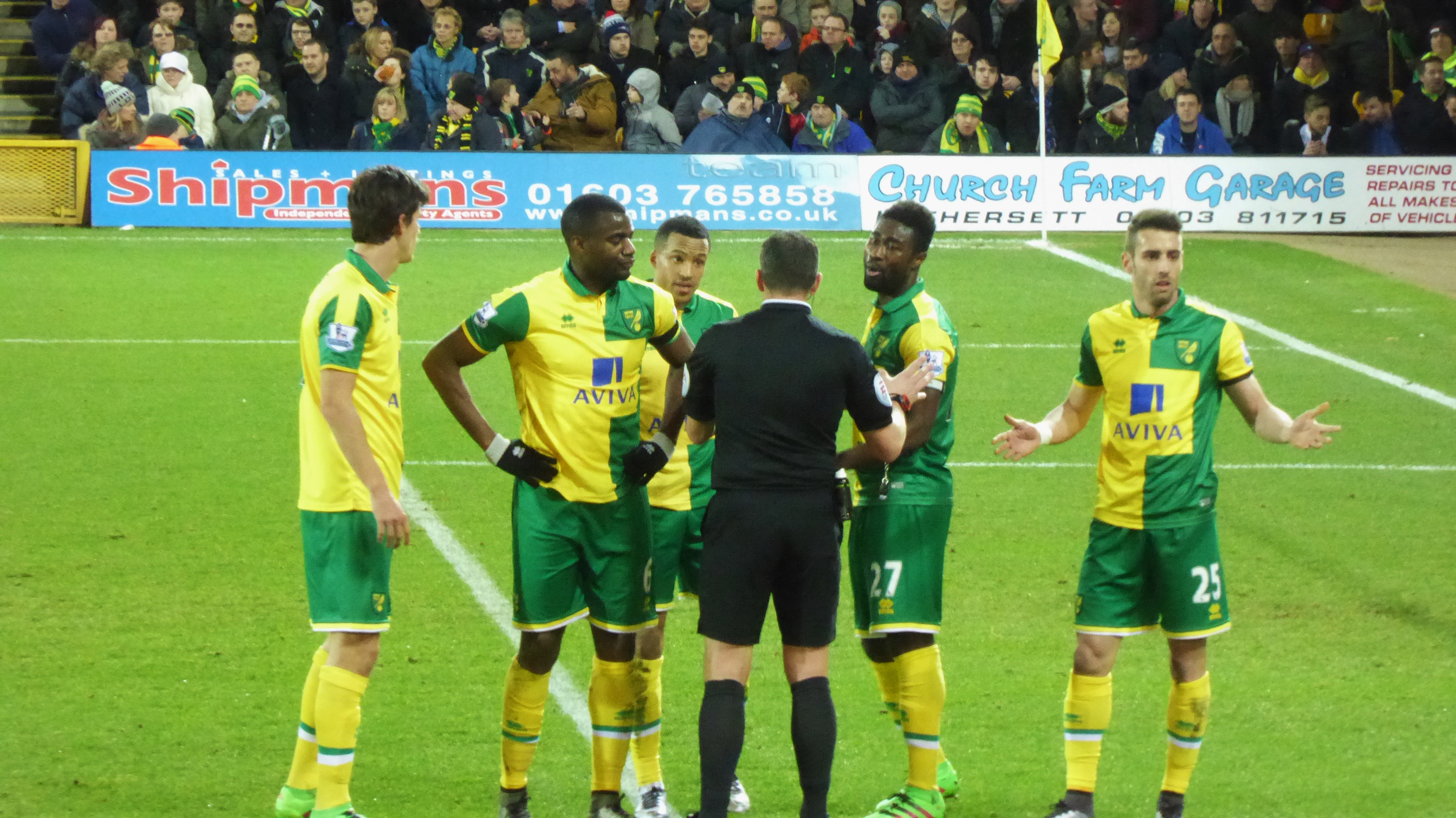
Pinto (No. 25) in February 2016

Pinto joined English club Norwich City on 8 January 2016, for a reported fee of £2.2 million. He made his Premier League debut 15 days later, playing the full 90 minutes in a 4–5 home loss to Liverpool.

Pinto scored the first goal of his career on 24 September 2016, in a 3–1 win over Burton Albion also at Carrow Road. They returned to the English top flight at the end of the 2018–19 campaign, but he contributed only three appearances to this feat (five overall).

In May 2019, Pinto announced he would be leaving Norwich as a free agent on 30 June. During his spell, he took part in 94 official matches.

=== Return to Dinamo ===
Pinto returned to Dinamo Zagreb on 10 May 2019, signing a three-year contract. In the following transfer window, he was loaned to newly promoted F.C. Famalicão until the end of the Portuguese top-tier season.

On 29 August 2020, still owned by the Croatian club, Pinto returned to Rio Ave.

=== Fortuna Sittard ===
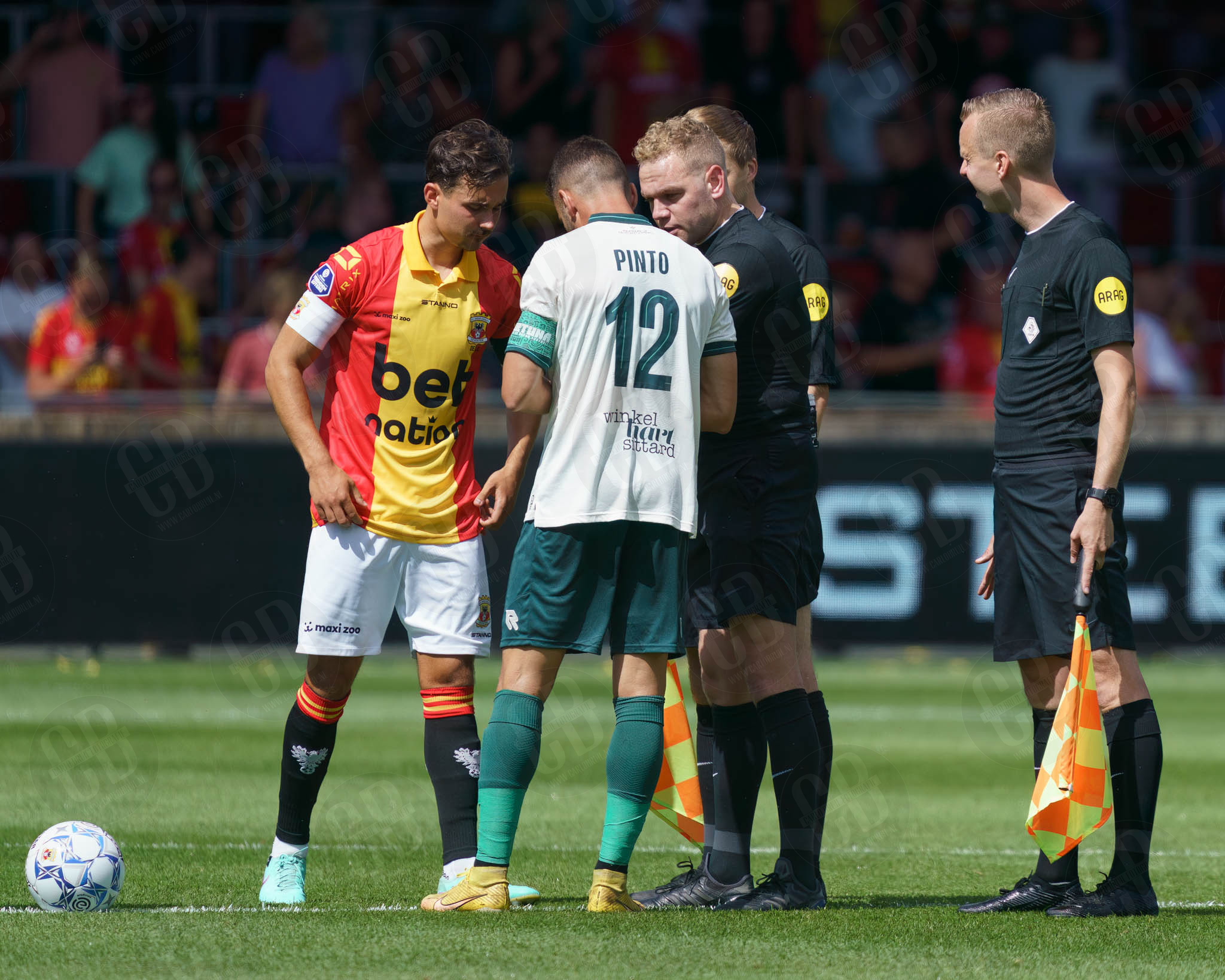
Pinto in August 2024

In August 2021, in a similar move, Pinto joined Fortuna Sittard. He made his Eredivisie debut on 12 September, as a 46th-minute replacement for Roel Janssen in the 3–1 loss to Sparta Rotterdam. He made his first start 13 days later in a 1–1 away draw against SBV Vitesse, playing 89 minutes before being subbed off for Nigel Lonwijk. He totalled 24 appearances for the campaign, including two in the KNVB Cup.

On 18 May 2022, Pinto signed a permanent one-year contract with an option to extend another year.

== International career ==
Pinto earned 34 caps for Portugal at youth level, including six for the under-21s. He was named in Fernando Santos' first squad as manager of the full side in October 2014, ahead of a friendly with France and a UEFA Euro 2016 qualifying match against Denmark.

== Style of play ==
Upon his arrival at Norwich City, manager Alex Neil described Pinto as a "good and athletic" defender. The player viewed himself as an intense and fast full-back, whilst his boss at Dinamo Zagreb Krunoslav Jurčić stated that he liked to attack in addition to being "solid defensively".

== Career statistics ==
As of match played 10 October 2026

Appearances and goals by club, season and competition
Club	Season	League			National Cup		League Cup		Europe		Other		Total	
Club	Season	Division	Apps	Goals	Apps	Goals	Apps	Goals	Apps	Goals	Apps	Goals	Apps	Goals
Porto	2008–09	Primeira Liga	0	0	0	0	1	0	0	0	0	0	1	0
Gil Vicente (loan)	2009–10	Segunda Liga	1	0	0	0	2	0	—		—		3	0
Vitória Setúbal (loan)	2009–10	Primeira Liga	3	0	0	0	1	0	—		—		4	0
Covilhã (loan)	2010–11	Segunda Liga	22	0	1	0	3	0	—		—		26	0
União Leiria (loan)	2011–12	Primeira Liga	25	0	1	0	0	0	—		—		26	0
CFR Cluj	2012–13	Liga I	27	0	5	0	0	0	12 (Note: Ten appearances in UEFA Champions League, two in UEFA Europa League)	0	1 (Note: Appearance in Supercupa României)	0	45	0
Dinamo Zagreb	2013–14	Prva HNL	28	0	5	0	—		12 (Note: Six appearances in UEFA Champions League, six appearances in UEFA Europa League)	0	—		45	0
Dinamo Zagreb	2014–15	Prva HNL	29	0	5	0	—		12 (Note: Four appearances in UEFA Champions League, eight in UEFA Europa League)	0	—		46	0
Dinamo Zagreb	2015–16	Prva HNL	13	0	0	0	—		8 (Note: Appearances in UEFA Champions League)	0	—		21	0
Dinamo Zagreb	Total		70	0	10	0	—		32	0	—		112	0
Norwich City	2015–16	Premier League	10	0	0	0	—		—		—		10	0
Norwich City	2016–17	Championship	37	1	1	0	0	0	—		—		38	1
Norwich City	2017–18	Championship	35	2	2	0	4	0	—		0	0	41	2
Norwich City	2018–19	Championship	3	0	0	0	2	0	—		0	0	5	0
Norwich City	Total		85	3	3	0	6	0	—		0	0	94	3
Famalicão (loan)	2019–20	Primeira Liga	15	0	3	0	0	0	—		—		18	0
Rio Ave (loan)	2020–21	Primeira Liga	26	0	2	0	0	0	—		2 (Note: Appearances in Primeira Liga relegation play-offs)	0	30	0
Fortuna Sittard (loan)	2021–22	Eredivisie	22	0	2	0	—		—		—		24	0
Fortuna Sittard	2022–23	Eredivisie	29	0	1	0	—		—		—		30	0
Fortuna Sittard	2023–24	Eredivisie	32	0	4	0	—		—		—		36	0
Fortuna Sittard	2024–25	Eredivisie	31	0	2	0	—		—		—		33	0
Fortuna Sittard	2025–26	Eredivisie	28	0	2	0	—		—		—		30	0
Fortuna Sittard	2026–27	Eredivisie	8	0	0	0	—		—		—		8	0
Fortuna Sittard	Total		150	0	11	0	—		—		—		161	0
Career total			424	3	36	0	13	0	44	0	3	0	520	3

== Honours ==
CFR Cluj

- Cupa României runner-up: 2012–13

Dinamo Zagreb

- Croatian First Football League: 2013–14, 2014–15, 2015–16, 2019–20
- Croatian Football Cup: 2014–15
