= Tijjani Noslin =

Dutch footballer (born 1999)

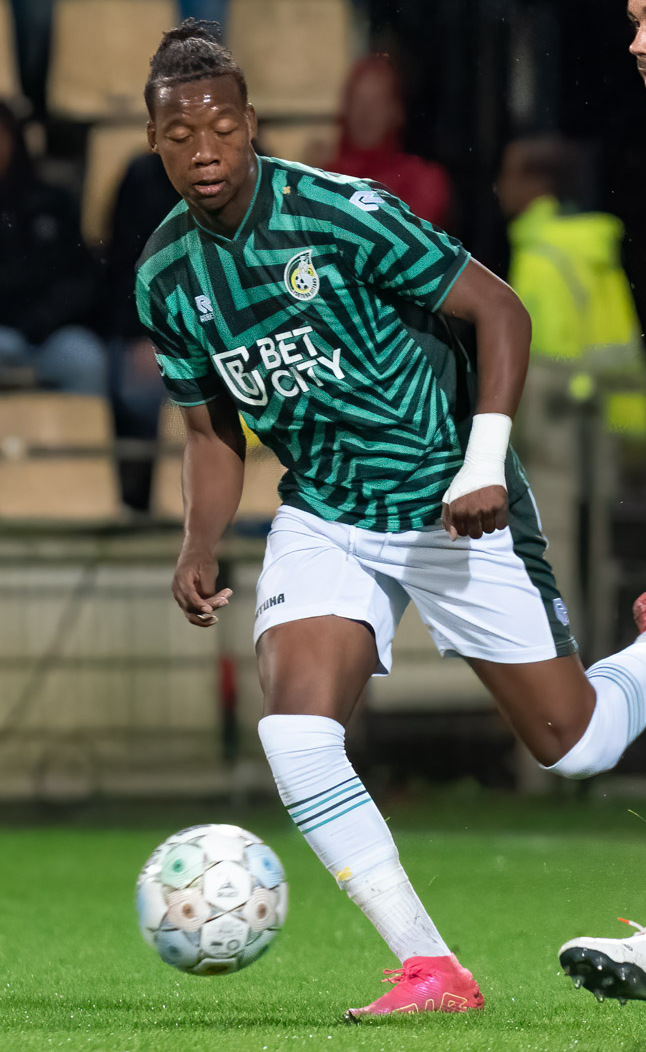
- Noslin playing for Fortuna Sittard in 2023

Personal information
- Date of birth: 7 July 1999 (age 27)
- Place of birth: Amsterdam, Netherlands
- Height: 1.83 m (6 ft 0 in)
- Position: Forward

Team information
- Current team: Lazio
- Number: 14

Youth career
- 2003−2011: ASV Arsenal
- 2011−2012: Buitenveldert
- 2012−2013: Swift
- 2013−2014: Den Bosch
- 2014−2015: OJC Rosmalen
- 2015−2016: RODA '23
- 2016−2017: Twente
- 2017−2019: USV Hercules

Senior career*
| Years | Team | Apps | (Gls) |
| 2018–2020 | USV Hercules | 26 | (10) |
| 2020–2021 | DHSC | 5 | (4) |
| 2021 | TOP Oss | 0 | (0) |
| 2021–2024 | Fortuna Sittard | 68 | (9) |
| 2024 | Hellas Verona | 17 | (5) |
| 2024– | Lazio | 67 | (10) |
- * Club domestic league appearances and goals as of 19:35, 27 October 2026 (UTC)

Tijjani Noslin (born 7 July 1999) is a Dutch professional footballer who plays as a forward for Serie A club Lazio.

Noslin began his senior career with amateur sides USV Hercules and DHSC before moving to Eredivisie club Fortuna Sittard, where he made his professional debut in 2021. After a brief spell at Hellas Verona in early 2024, he transferred to Lazio later that year.

== Club career ==
=== Early years ===
Born in Amsterdam, Noslin played for several clubs in his hometown, including ASV Arsenal, Buitenveldert and Swift, before moving to 's-Hertogenbosch at age 14 to join FC Den Bosch's academy. He was, however, released and he returned to Amsterdam a year later, continuing to play for youth teams of lower league clubs including OJC Rosmalen and RODA '23. He later joined FC Twente's academy, but was released as an 18-year-old, with the club citing his lack of height.

After a failed trial at an academy in Manchester, he signed for amateur Dutch side USV Hercules. He made 26 league appearances and scored 10 goals for Hercules between 2017 and 2020, prior to joining DHSC in summer 2020.

After five league appearances for DHSC across the 2020–21 season, in which he was tutored by assistant coach Wesley Sneijder and former professional players Mounir El Hamdaoui and Ismaïl Aissati, Noslin signed an amateur contract with TOP Oss in the summer of 2021.

=== Fortuna Sittard ===
As Noslin was not under a professional contract at TOP Oss, he joined Eredivisie side Fortuna Sittard later that summer on a free transfer, and signed a three-year contract. He made his debut for the club on 18 September 2021 as a substitute for George Cox in a 1–0 defeat to SC Heerenveen.

He scored his first professional goal the following month with the opening goal of a 1–1 draw with Willem II after coming on as a half-time substitute. On 20 November, he was granted his first start in professional football by head coach Sjors Ultee in a 3–1 away defeat to Heracles Almelo. He finished his first season at Fortuna with one goal in 26 total appearances.

During his second season at the club, Noslin grew into a regular starter. After scoring a goal against Volendam on 17 March 2023, he was praised by former Netherlands international Rafael van der Vaart on Studio Voetbal, who described him as "a nice player who is always dangerous. Very direct. He possesses all".

=== Hellas Verona ===
On 23 January 2024, Noslin signed with Serie A club Hellas Verona for an undisclosed fee, reported to be approximately €3 million. He made his debut for the club five days later in a 1–1 home draw against Frosinone. On 17 February, he scored his first Serie A goal in a 2–2 draw against Juventus. Noslin concluded the season with 17 league appearances, recording five goals and four assists, and played an important role in helping Verona maintain their Serie A status.

=== Lazio ===
Following the conclusion of the 2023–24 season, and the departure of manager Marco Baroni from Hellas Verona to Lazio in June 2024, Noslin followed his former coach to the capital, joining I Biancocelesti on 30 June 2024. The transfer was completed for a reported fee of €15.9 million, marking one of the club's major signings ahead of the new campaign.

Noslin made his competitive debut for Lazio on 18 August 2024, starting in a 3–1 home victory against newly promoted Venezia in the opening match of the Serie A season. On 25 September, he made his European debut in a UEFA Europa League group stage match against Dynamo Kyiv, coming on as a substitute in the 79th minute. Shortly after entering the field, he was sent off for an elbow on Ukrainian defender Vladyslav Dubinchak, receiving a red card three minutes into his appearance.

Four days later, on 29 September, Noslin scored his first goal for the club, contributing to a 3–2 league victory against Torino. On 5 December 2024, Noslin scored his first senior hat-trick in a 3–1 victory over Napoli in the Coppa Italia Round of 16, becoming a key contributor in Lazio's domestic cup campaign.

== Style of play ==
Noslin is recognised for his versatility in attacking positions, primarily operating as a winger but also capable of playing centrally as a striker. His playing style is characterised by directness, pace, and a strong ability to exploit spaces during transitions. Analysts have highlighted his intelligence both on and off the ball, noting his effectiveness in both attacking and defensive phases of play, particularly in teams employing counter-attacking strategies.

During his time at Fortuna Sittard, Noslin was lauded by pundit and former Netherlands international Rafael van der Vaart on Studio Voetbal, who described him as "a nice player who is always dangerous. Very direct. He possesses all".

== Personal life ==
Born in the Netherlands, Noslin is of Surinamese descent.

== Career statistics ==
As of match played 27 October 2026

Appearances and goals by club, season and competition
| Club | Season | League | | | National cup (Note: Includes KNVB Cup, Coppa Italia) | | Europe | | Total | |
| Club | Season | Division | Apps | Goals | Apps | Goals | Apps | Goals | Apps | Goals |
|---|---|---|---|---|---|---|---|---|---|---|
| USV Hercules | 2018–19 | Derde Divisie | 10 | 4 | 0 | 0 | — | | 10 | 4 |
| USV Hercules | 2019–20 | Derde Divisie | 16 | 6 | 1 | 0 | — | | 17 | 6 |
| USV Hercules | Total | | 26 | 10 | 1 | 0 | 0 | 0 | 27 | 10 |
| DHSC | 2020–21 | Hoofdklasse | 5 | 4 | 0 | 0 | — | | 5 | 4 |
| Fortuna Sittard | 2021–22 | Eredivisie | 24 | 1 | 2 | 0 | — | | 26 | 1 |
| Fortuna Sittard | 2022–23 | Eredivisie | 31 | 5 | 0 | 0 | — | | 31 | 5 |
| Fortuna Sittard | 2023–24 | Eredivisie | 13 | 3 | 1 | 1 | — | | 14 | 4 |
| Fortuna Sittard | Total | | 68 | 9 | 3 | 1 | 0 | 0 | 71 | 10 |
| Hellas Verona | 2023–24 | Serie A | 17 | 5 | — | | — | | 17 | 5 |
| Lazio | 2024–25 | Serie A | 30 | 2 | 2 | 3 | 7 (Note: Appearances in UEFA Europa League) | 1 | 39 | 6 |
| Lazio | 2025–26 | Serie A | 29 | 4 | 5 | 1 | — | | 34 | 5 |
| Lazio | 2026–27 | Serie A | 8 | 4 | 1 | 0 | — | | 9 | 4 |
| Lazio | Total | | 67 | 10 | 8 | 4 | 7 | 1 | 82 | 15 |
| Career total | | | 183 | 38 | 12 | 5 | 7 | 1 | 202 | 44 |
