= Arianit Ferati =

German footballer (born 1997)

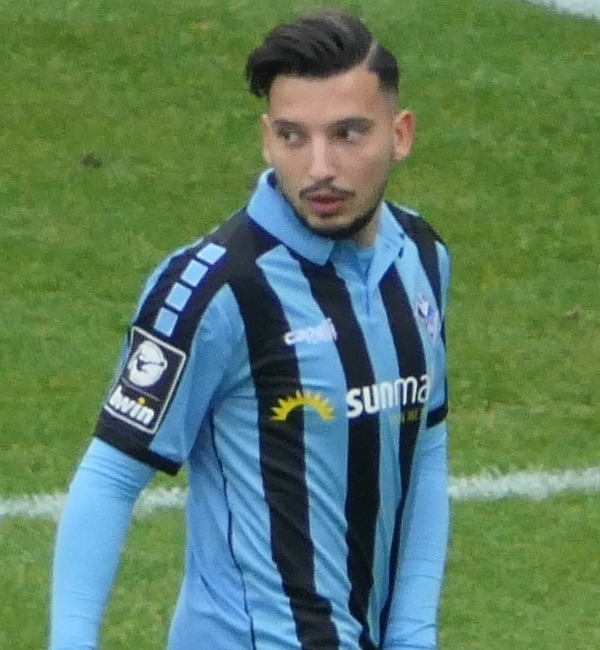
- Ferati with Waldhof Mannheim in 2019

Personal information
- Date of birth: 7 September 1997 (age 29)
- Place of birth: Stuttgart, Germany
- Height: 1.68 m (5 ft 6 in)
- Position: Attacking midfielder

Team information
- Current team: SV Sandhausen
- Number: 47

Youth career
- TSV Großheppach
- –2009: SC Weinstadt
- 2009–2011: Stuttgarter Kickers
- 2011–2015: VfB Stuttgart

Senior career*
| Years | Team | Apps | (Gls) |
| 2015–2016 | VfB Stuttgart II | 17 | (3) |
| 2015–2016 | VfB Stuttgart | 3 | (0) |
| 2016–2019 | Hamburger SV | 0 | (0) |
| 2016–2017 | → Fortuna Düsseldorf (loan) | 13 | (1) |
| 2017 | → Erzgebirge Aue (loan) | 4 | (0) |
| 2018–2019 | → Hamburger SV II | 26 | (7) |
| 2019–2021 | Waldhof Mannheim | 51 | (6) |
| 2021–2024 | Fortuna Sittard | 57 | (1) |
| 2025–2026 | Waldhof Mannheim | 41 | (4) |
| 2026– | SV Sandhausen | 7 | (2) |

International career^{‡}
| 2013 | Germany U16 | 3 | (1) |
| 2013–2014 | Germany U17 | 13 | (4) |
| 2015 | Germany U18 | 2 | (0) |
| 2015 | Germany U19 | 7 | (1) |
| 2016–2017 | Germany U20 | 3 | (2) |
| 2022– | Kosovo | 1 | (0) |
- * Club domestic league appearances and goals as of 24 September 2026 ‡ National team caps and goals as of 16 November 2022

Arianit Ferati (born 7 September 1997) is a professional footballer who plays as an attacking midfielder for German Regionalliga Südwest club SV Sandhausen. Born in Germany, he plays for the Kosovo national team.

== Club career ==
=== Early career and VfB Stuttgart ===
Ferati initially played for TSV Großheppach and SC Weinstadt in his youth. In the summer of 2011, he transferred to the Stuttgarter Kickers' youth team and after two years transferred to the VfB Stuttgart's youth team.

==== 2015–16 period ====
Ferati in the 2015–16 season was promoted directly to the first team of VfB Stuttgart. On 31 July 2015, he made his debut with second team in a 1–3 home defeat against Preußen Münster after being named in the starting line-up.

On 29 August 2015, Ferati was named as a first team substitute for the first time in a league match against Eintracht Frankfurt. His debut with first team came fourteen days later in a 2–1 away defeat against Hertha BSC after coming on as a substitute in the 79th minute in place of Daniel Didavi.

=== Hamburger SV ===
==== Joining the team and loan to Fortuna Düsseldorf ====
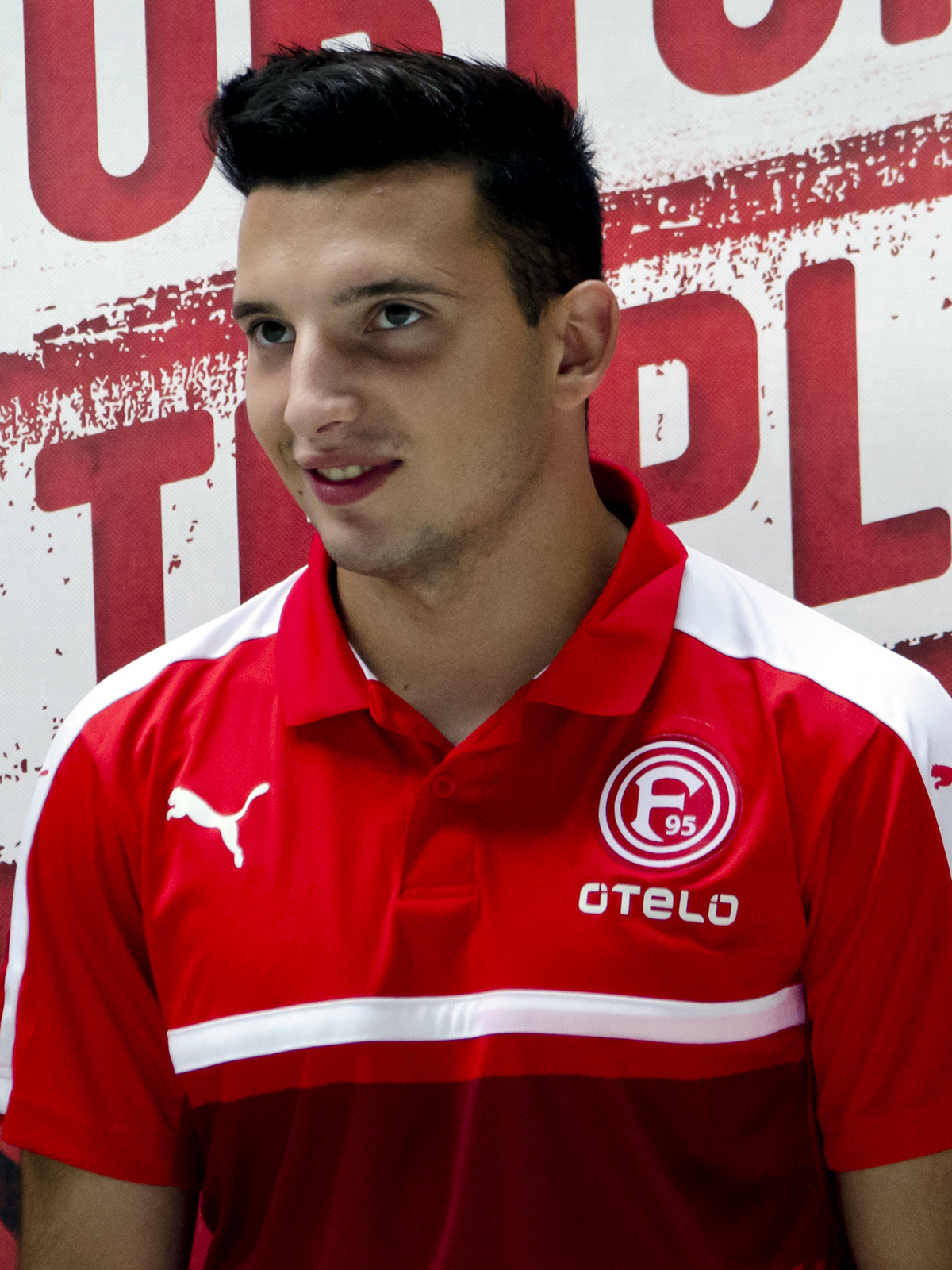
Ferati with Fortuna Düsseldorf in 2016

On 1 July 2016, Ferati signed a four-year contract with Bundesliga club Hamburger SV and was loaned out for a season to the 2. Bundesliga club Fortuna Düsseldorf. On 29 August 2016, he was named as a Fortuna Düsseldorf substitute for the first time in a league match against 1. FC Kaiserslautern. His debut with Fortuna Düsseldorf came fourteen days later in a 1–1 home draw against Greuther Fürth after coming on as a substitute in the 57th minute in place of Axel Bellinghausen.

==== Loan at Erzgebirge Aue ====
On 8 June 2017, Ferati joined 2. Bundesliga side Erzgebirge Aue, on a season-long loan. Two month later, he made his debut in a 0–2 home defeat against his former team Fortuna Düsseldorf after coming on as a substitute in the 73rd minute in place of Calogero Rizzuto.

==== Return from loan and period in the second team ====
On 1 January 2018, Hamburger SV cancels Ferati's loan and returns him to the team, but due to competition in the first team he is sent to the second team. On 26 February 2018, he made his debut with second team against VfL Wolfsburg II after being named in the starting line-up and scored his side's first goal during a 2–2 away draw.

=== Waldhof Mannheim ===
On 9 July 2019, Ferati signed a two-year contract with 3. Liga club Waldhof Mannheim. Twelve days later, he was named as a Waldhof Mannheim substitute for the first time in a league match against Chemnitzer FC. His debut with Waldhof Mannheim came on 11 August in the 2019–20 DFB-Pokal first round against Eintracht Frankfurt after coming on as a substitute in the 63rd minute in place of Gianluca Korte.

=== Fortuna Sittard ===
On 29 July 2021, Ferati signed a two-year contract with Eredivisie club Fortuna Sittard. Sixteen days later, he made his debut in a 2–1 home win against Twente after being named in the starting line-up.

Ferati scored his first competitive goal for Fortuna on 9 October 2022, helping the club to a 2–1 away victory in the Eredivisie against Vitesse.

=== Return to Waldhof Mannheim ===
On 13 January 2025, Ferati returned to Waldhof Mannheim.

=== SV Sandhausen ===
On 14 July 2026, Ferati signed with SV Sandhausen in the fourth-tier Regionalliga Südwest.

== International career ==
From 2013, until 2017, Ferati has been part of Germany at youth international level, respectively has been part of the U16, U17, U18, U19 and U20 teams and he with these teams played 28 matches and scored 8 goals. He also played in the 2014 UEFA European Under-17 Championship.

In addition to his birthplace Germany, he had the right to represent Kosovo internationally, an alternative which he used in November 2022, where he decided to represent Kosovo and accept their call-up for the friendly matches against Armenia and Faroe Islands. His debut with Kosovo came five days after call-up in a friendly match against Armenia after coming on as a substitute in the 65th minute in place of Uran Bislimi.

== Personal life ==
Ferati was born in Stuttgart, Germany to Albanian parents from Mitrovicë, Kosovo. He is a Muslim. His younger brother Ali Ferati is a footballer who plays as a attacking midfielder for the German club SV Fellbach.

== Career statistics ==
=== Club ===
As of match played 3 July 2024

Appearances and goals by club, season and competition
| Club | Season | League | | | National cup (Note: Includes DFB-Pokal, KNVB Cup) | | Other | | Total | |
| Club | Season | Division | Apps | Goals | Apps | Goals | Apps | Goals | Apps | Goals |
|---|---|---|---|---|---|---|---|---|---|---|
| VfB Stuttgart II | 2015–16 | Regionalliga Südwest | 17 | 3 | 0 | 0 | — | | 17 | 3 |
| VfB Stuttgart | 2015–16 | Bundesliga | 3 | 0 | 1 | 0 | — | | 4 | 0 |
| Hamburger SV | 2016–17 | Bundesliga | 0 | 0 | 0 | 0 | — | | 0 | 0 |
| Fortuna Düsseldorf (loan) | 2016–17 | 2. Bundesliga | 13 | 1 | 1 | 0 | 7 (Note: Appearance with Fortuna Düsseldorf II) | 1 | 21 | 2 |
| Erzgebirge Aue (loan) | 2017–18 | 2. Bundesliga | 4 | 0 | 1 | 0 | — | | 5 | 0 |
| Hamburger SV II | 2017–18 | Regionalliga Nord | 13 | 4 | 0 | 0 | — | | 13 | 4 |
| Hamburger SV II | 2018–19 | Regionalliga Nord | 13 | 3 | 0 | 0 | — | | 13 | 3 |
| Hamburger SV II | Total | | 26 | 7 | 0 | 0 | — | | 26 | 7 |
| Waldhof Mannheim | 2019–20 | 3. Liga | 26 | 2 | 1 | 0 | 5 (Note: Appearances in Baden Cup) | 2 | 32 | 4 |
| Waldhof Mannheim | 2020–21 | 3. Liga | 25 | 4 | 1 | 0 | 4 | 2 | 30 | 6 |
| Waldhof Mannheim | Total | | 51 | 6 | 2 | 0 | 9 | 4 | 42 | 10 |
| Fortuna Sittard | 2021–22 | Eredivisie | 14 | 0 | 2 | 0 | — | | 16 | 0 |
| Fortuna Sittard | 2022–23 | Eredivisie | 27 | 1 | 1 | 0 | — | | 28 | 1 |
| Fortuna Sittard | 2023–24 | Eredivisie | 16 | 0 | 3 | 0 | — | | 19 | 0 |
| Fortuna Sittard | Total | | 57 | 1 | 6 | 0 | — | | 63 | 1 |
| Career total | | | 171 | 18 | 11 | 0 | 16 | 5 | 198 | 23 |
