= Mike van Beijnen =

Dutch footballer (born 1999)

Personal information
- Full name: Mike Johannes Hendrikus Josephus van Beijnen
- Date of birth: 7 March 1999 (age 27)
- Place of birth: Breda, Netherlands
- Height: 1.87 m (6 ft 2 in)
- Position: Right-back

Youth career
- SAB
- The Gunners
- 2010–2011: RBC
- 2011–2017: Willem II
- 2018: PSV
- 2018–2019: NAC Breda

Senior career*
Years	Team	Apps	(Gls)
2019	Barcelona B	0	(0)
2020	Gençlerbirliği	1	(0)
2020–2023	Fortuna Sittard	5	(0)
2021–2022	→ Den Bosch (loan)	28	(1)
2023	Emmen	0	(0)
2024	Beerschot	1	(0)
2025	RBC Roosendaal	0	(0)
- * Club domestic league appearances and goals as of 1 February 2026

Mike Johannes Hendrikus Josephus van Beijnen (born 7 March 1999) is a Dutch professional footballer who plays as a right-back.

== Career ==
=== Youth career ===
Born in Breda, Van Beijnen played youth football for SAB, The Gunners, RBC, Willem II, PSV, and NAC Breda, before moving to Spanish club Barcelona B in June 2019, signing a two-year contract with a €100 million release clause. Van Beijnen, the stepson of Frenkie de Jong's agent, Ali Dursun, was part of the deal that sent De Jong to Barcelona as a gesture from the club towards Dursun.

=== Gençlerbirliği ===
Van Beijnen moved to Turkish club Gençlerbirliği in January 2020, six months after arriving in Barcelona and without making any appearances for the Catalan side. He made his professional debut on 19 July 2020, appearing as a substitute in the Süper Lig.

=== Fortuna Sittard ===
In August 2020, Van Beijnen returned to the Netherlands, signing for Fortuna Sittard. He made his debut for the club – which was also his debut in the Eredivisie – on 5 December 2020 in a 3–2 win over Willem II, coming on as a substitute in the 72nd minute for Emil Hansson.

In August 2021 he moved on loan to Den Bosch. He scored his first professional goal for the club on 22 October 2021, opening the score in a 3–3 away draw against Dordrecht.

=== Emmen ===
On 3 July 2023, Van Beijnen signed a two-year contract with Emmen, with an optional third year. The contract was terminated by mutual consent on 28 July 2023, before the season started.

=== Beerschot ===
In January 2024, Van Beijnen signed a six-month contract with Challenger Pro League club Beerschot. He made only one competitive appearance for the club during their successful campaign to win the Belgian second-tier title and secure promotion to the Belgian Pro League. He departed shortly after, as his contract expired.

=== RBC Roosendaal ===
In February 2025 he signed for RBC Roosendaal, as an amateur.

== Career statistics ==
As of match played 28 January 2024

Appearances and goals by club, season and competition
Club	Season	League			National cup		Other		Total	
Club	Season	Division	Apps	Goals	Apps	Goals	Apps	Goals	Apps	Goals
Barcelona B	2019–20	Segunda División B	0	0	—		—		0	0
Gençlerbirliği	2019–20	Süper Lig	1	0	0	0	—		1	0
Fortuna Sittard	2020–21	Eredivisie	4	0	0	0	—		4	0
Fortuna Sittard	2021–22	Eredivisie	0	0	0	0	—		0	0
Fortuna Sittard	2022–23	Eredivisie	1	0	0	0	—		1	0
Fortuna Sittard	Total		5	0	0	0	—		5	0
Den Bosch (loan)	2021–22	Eerste Divisie	28	1	1	0	—		30	3
Beerschot	2023–24	Challenger Pro League	1	0	—		—		1	0
Career total			35	1	1	0	0	0	36	1

== Honours ==
Beerschot

- Challenger Pro League: 2023–24
