= Samy Baghdadi =

French footballer (born 1997)

Personal information
- Date of birth: 11 July 1997 (age 29)
- Place of birth: Grasse, France
- Height: 1.80 m (5 ft 11 in)
- Position: Forward

Team information
- Current team: Sochaux
- Number: 5

Senior career*
Years	Team	Apps	(Gls)
2016–2017	Cannet Rocheville	20	(14)
2017–2020	Saint-Étienne II	38	(15)
2020–2021	Grasse	14	(8)
2021–2022	Fortuna Sittard	10	(1)
2022–2024	Dunkerque	44	(11)
2024–2025	Versailles	31	(13)
2025–2026	Valenciennes	13	(0)
2026	→ Sochaux (loan)	17	(3)
2026–	Sochaux	0	(0)
- * Club domestic league appearances and goals as of 23 June 2026

Samy Baghdadi (born 11 July 1997) is a French professional footballer who plays as a forward for Ligue 2 club Sochaux.

== Career ==
Born in Grasse, Baghdadi played for Cannet Rocheville, Saint-Étienne II, and Grasse before joining Eredivisie club Fortuna Sittard on a two-year contract with the option of a further year in summer 2021, following a trial period at the club. He made his debut for the club on 14 April 2021 in a 2–1 win over Twente.

On 4 August 2022, Baghdadi returned to France and signed with Dunkerque.

On 25 June 2026, Baghdadi moved to Sochaux for two seasons on a permanent basis after playing on loan in the 2025–26 season.

== Personal life ==
Born in France, Baghdadi holds both French and Algerian nationalities.
