= Ryan Johansson =

Luxembourgish footballer (born 2001)

Personal information
- Full name: Ryan Nils Johansson
- Date of birth: 15 February 2001 (age 25)
- Place of birth: Luxembourg City, Luxembourg
- Height: 1.86 m (6 ft 1 in)
- Position: Midfielder

Team information
- Current team: Preußen Münster
- Number: 20

Youth career
- Racing-Union
- 2015–2016: Metz
- 2017–2020: Bayern Munich

Senior career*
Years	Team	Apps	(Gls)
2020–2023	Sevilla Atlético	39	(2)
2021–2022	→ Fortuna Sittard (loan)	6	(0)
2023–2024	SC Freiburg II	27	(2)
2024–2026	SV Wehen Wiesbaden	63	(4)
2026–	Preußen Münster	6	(1)

International career
2016–2017	Luxembourg U16	7	(1)
2016–2017	Luxembourg U17	6	(0)
2017	Sweden U17	3	(0)
2018	Republic of Ireland U19	2	(0)
2018	Luxembourg U19	3	(0)
2018	Luxembourg U21	2	(0)
2021	Republic of Ireland U21	5	(0)
- * Club domestic league appearances and goals as of 16 September 2026

Ryan Nils Johansson (born 15 February 2001) is a professional footballer who plays as a midfielder for German 3. Liga club Preußen Münster. Born in Luxembourg, he has represented Luxembourg, Sweden and the Republic of Ireland at youth international level.

== Club career ==
Johansson is a former youth academy player of his hometown club Racing-Union. He subsequently moved to Metz and joined Bayern Munich later. He was an unused substitute in Bayern Munich's 2–0 defeat to Borussia Dortmund in the 2019 DFL-Supercup.

On 22 January 2020, Johansson joined Spanish club Sevilla on a contract until June 2026. On 13 August 2021, he joined Eredivisie club Fortuna Sittard on a season long loan deal. He made his professional debut for the club on 2 October 2021 in a 3–1 league defeat to NEC.

On 30 August 2023, Johansson signed with SC Freiburg II in the 3. Liga. He scored his first goal for the team on 16 September 2023, in a 2–0 away win against Arminia Bielefeld.

On 8 July 2024, Johansson joined SV Wehen Wiesbaden. In June 2026, he joined Preußen Münster.

== International career ==
Born in Luxembourg to a Swedish father and Irish mother, Johansson has represented all three countries at international level. In January 2019, Johansson announced that he intended to pledge his future to Ireland. In May 2021, he received clearance from FIFA to switch his allegiance from Luxembourg to Ireland.

== Career statistics ==
As of match played on 11 April 2026

Appearances and goals by club, season and competition
Club	Season	League			National cup (Note: Includes KNVB Beker, DFB Pokal)		Other		Total	
Club	Season	Division	Apps	Goals	Apps	Goals	Apps	Goals	Apps	Goals
Sevilla Atlético	2019–20	Segunda División B	6	0	—		—		6	0
Sevilla Atlético	2020–21	Segunda División B	9	0	—		—		9	0
Sevilla Atlético	2022–23	Segunda Federación	24	2	—		—		24	2
Sevilla Atlético	Total		39	2	0	0	0	0	39	2
Fortuna Sittard (loan)	2021–22	Eredivisie	6	0	2	0	—		8	0
SC Freiburg II	2023–24	3. Liga	27	2	—		—		27	2
SV Wehen Wiesbaden	2024–25	3. Liga	31	2	0	0	4 (Note: Appearances in Hessian Cup)	0	35	2
SV Wehen Wiesbaden	2025–26	3. Liga	30	1	1	0	3	1	34	2
SV Wehen Wiesbaden	Total		61	3	1	0	7	1	69	4
Career total			133	7	3	0	7	1	143	8

== Honours ==
SV Wehen Wiesbaden

- Hessian Cup: 2024–25
