= George Cox (footballer) =

English footballer (born 1998)

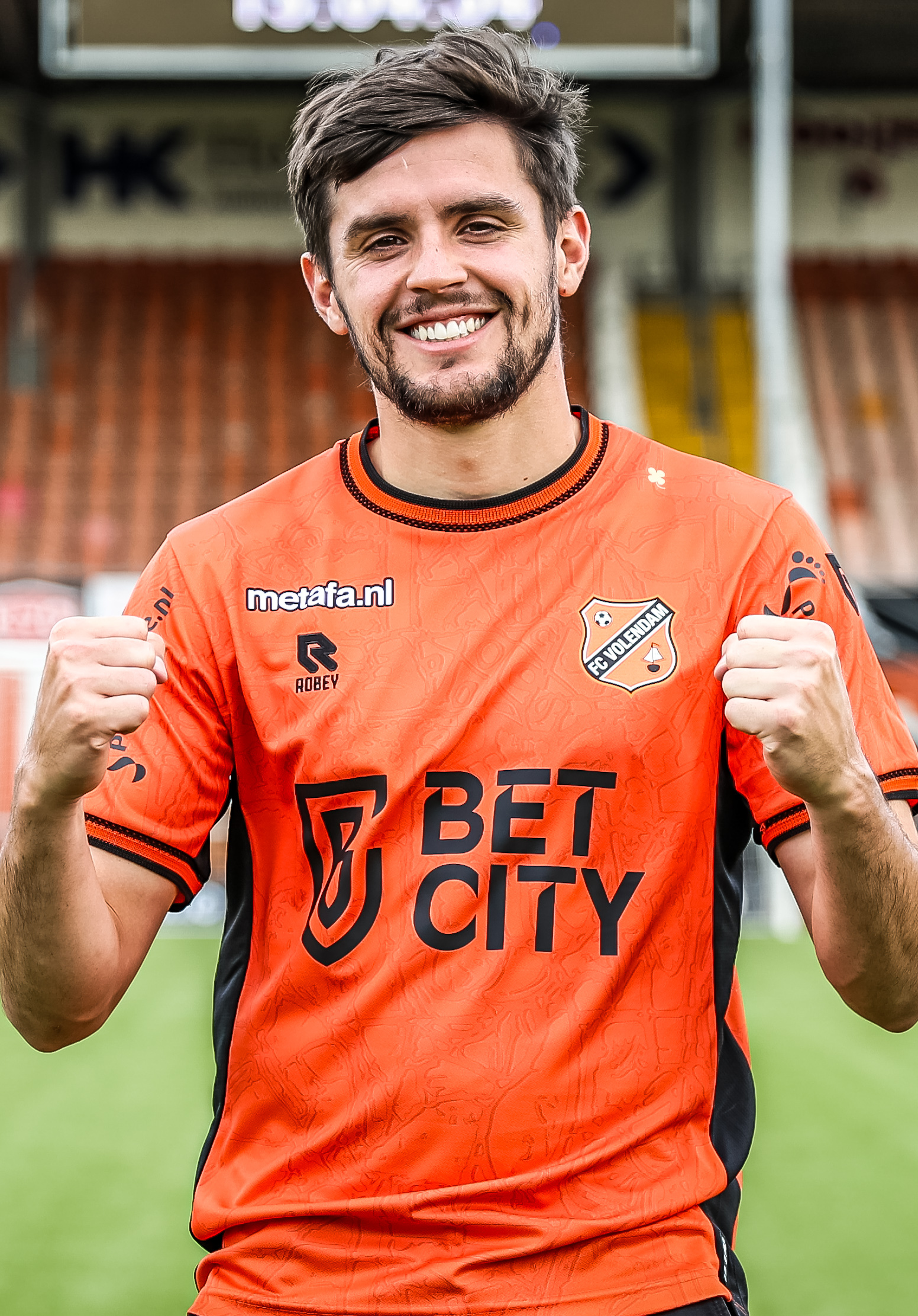
- Cox in 2023

Personal information
- Full name: George Frederick Cox
- Date of birth: 14 January 1998 (age 28)
- Place of birth: Worthing, England
- Height: 5 ft 7 in (1.71 m)
- Position: Left-back

Team information
- Current team: Horsham

Youth career
- 2009–2018: Brighton & Hove Albion

Senior career*
Years	Team	Apps	(Gls)
2018–2020	Brighton & Hove Albion	0	(0)
2019	→ Northampton Town (loan)	5	(0)
2019–2020	→ Fortuna Sittard (loan)	21	(1)
2020–2023	Fortuna Sittard	87	(7)
2023–2024	Volendam	23	(0)
2024–2025	Swindon Town	26	(2)
2025–2026	Worthing	14	(1)
2026–	Horsham	6	(1)
- * Club domestic league appearances and goals as of 19:28, 21 November 2026 (UTC)

George Frederick Cox (born 14 January 1998) is an English professional footballer who plays as a left-back for Horsham.

== Career ==
=== Brighton & Hove Albion ===
Cox began his career with Brighton & Hove Albion, undergoing heart surgery which nearly ended his career.

==== Northampton Town (loan) ====
He moved on loan to Northampton Town on 7 January 2019 on a six-month deal. Cox made his Northampton debut in a League Two match against Carlisle where Northampton won 3–0 on 12 January 2019.

=== Fortuna Sittard ===
On 2 September 2019, Cox signed with Dutch club Fortuna Sittard on a season-long loan with the option of a permanent move. He made his debut for the club on 15 September 2019, starting at left-back in a 3–2 Eredivisie loss to Twente. On 6 March 2020, the final matchday before the 2019–20 Eredivisie campaign was abandoned due to the COVID-19 pandemic in the Netherlands, Cox scored his first goal for Fortuna in a 1–1 league draw against PEC Zwolle.

On 6 July 2020, it was announced that Cox had signed permanently with Fortuna Sittard on a three-year deal, for a fee of €50,000.

=== Volendam ===
In September 2023 he signed for Volendam.

=== Swindon Town ===
On 30 August 2024, Cox signed for EFL League Two club Swindon Town. He broke his foot in January 2025.

On 9 May 2025, Swindon announced the player would be leaving in June when his contract expired.

=== Worthing ===
In October 2025, Cox joined hometown club Worthing of the National League South.

On 2 October 2026, having yet to feature in the 2026–27 season due to injury, he departed the club by mutual consent.

=== Horsham ===
George Cox playing for Horsham 2026

On 14 October 2026, Cox signed for National League South side Horsham. On 31 October 2026, he scored his first goal for Horsham in a 5-0 away win against Farnborough.

== Career statistics ==
As of match played 21 November 2026

Appearances and goals by club, season and competition
Club	Season	League			National cup		League cup		Other		Total	
Club	Season	Division	Apps	Goals	Apps	Goals	Apps	Goals	Apps	Goals	Apps	Goals
Brighton & Hove Albion	2018–19	Premier League	0	0	0	0	0	0	—		0	0
Brighton & Hove Albion	2019–20	Premier League	0	0	0	0	0	0	—		0	0
Brighton & Hove Albion	Total		0	0	0	0	0	0	0	0	0	0
Northampton Town (loan)	2018–19	League Two	5	0	0	0	0	0	0	0	5	0
Fortuna Sittard (loan)	2019–20	Eredivisie	21	1	2	0	—		—		23	1
Fortuna Sittard	2020–21	Eredivisie	33	5	2	0	—		—		35	5
Fortuna Sittard	2021–22	Eredivisie	27	2	1	2	—		—		28	4
Fortuna Sittard	2022–23	Eredivisie	27	0	1	0	—		—		28	0
Fortuna Sittard	Total		87	7	4	2	0	0	0	0	91	9
FC Volendam	2023–24	Eredivisie	23	0	1	0	—		—		24	0
Swindon Town	2024–25	League Two	26	2	2	0	0	0	1 (Note: Appearance in the EFL Trophy)	0	29	2
Worthing	2025–26	National League South	14	1	0	0	0	0	0	0	14	1
Worthing	2026–27	National League	0	0	0	0	0	0	0	0	0	0
Worthing	Total		14	1	0	0	0	0	0	0	14	1
Horsham	2026–27	National League South	6	1	0	0	0	0	1	0	7	1
Career total			182	12	9	2	0	0	2	0	193	14

== Honours ==
Worthing

- National League South: 2025–26
