= Michael Verrips =

Dutch footballer (born 1996)

Personal information
- Full name: Michael Robin Verrips
- Date of birth: 3 December 1996 (age 29)
- Place of birth: Velp, Netherlands
- Height: 1.96 m (6 ft 5 in)
- Position: Goalkeeper

Team information
- Current team: NAC Breda
- Number: 1

Youth career
- –2011: Vitesse
- 2011–2013: PSV
- 2013–2014: Twente

Senior career*
Years	Team	Apps	(Gls)
2014–2015	Jong Twente	0	(0)
2015–2016	Twente	0	(0)
2016–2018	Jong Sparta	13	(0)
2016–2018	Sparta Rotterdam	1	(0)
2017–2018	→ MVV (loan)	38	(0)
2018–2019	Mechelen	27	(0)
2019–2022	Sheffield United	1	(0)
2021	→ Emmen (loan)	14	(0)
2022	→ Fortuna Sittard (loan)	2	(0)
2022–2024	Fortuna Sittard	12	(0)
2022–2024	→ Groningen (loan)	34	(0)
2024–2026	Dender	44	(0)
2026–	NAC Breda	9	(0)

International career
2014	Netherlands U19	1	(0)
2015–2016	Netherlands U20	5	(0)
- * Club domestic league appearances and goals as of 3 October 2026

Michael Robin Verrips (born 3 December 1996) is a Dutch professional footballer who plays as a goalkeeper for Eerste Divisie club NAC Breda.

== Club career ==
Verrips began playing youth football for Vitesse. In 2011 he moved to PSV, where he rose through the youth teams in his two years at the club.

After leaving PSV, Verrips signed a one-year deal with FC Twente where, after a season in the youth team, he signed his first professional contract in 2014. However, having played no first team games for Twente, he joined Eredivisie side Sparta Rotterdam.

During his first season at Sparta Rotterdam, Verrips made appearances mainly for the second team, Jong Sparta. He made his Eredivisie debut for Sparta Rotterdam on 14 May 2017 in a game against Go Ahead Eagles. At the beginning of the 2017–18 season, Verrips signed on loan for Maastricht. Here he finally made a breakthrough, playing all 38 league games, one KNVB Cup match against AZ, and the club's two unsuccessful play-off games against Almere City. Verrips returned to Sparta Rotterdam at the end of the season.

On 1 July 2018, Verrips joined KV Mechelen where in July 2019 he unilaterally terminated his contract due to the conviction for match-fixing.

On 8 August 2019, he joined newly promoted Premier League club Sheffield United on a four-year deal.

On 1 February 2021, Verrips joined Eredivisie side FC Emmen on loan for the remainder of the 2020–21 season.

On 11 January 2022, Verrips joined Eredivisie side Fortuna Sittard on loan for the remainder of the 2021–22 season, with the option to buy Verrips in the summer.

At the end of the season, Fortuna Sittard exercised the purchase option and signed a three-year contract with Verrips, and then loaned him to Groningen for the 2022–23 season, with an option to buy. The loan was extended for the 2023–24 season. On 12 January 2024, Fortuna Sittard terminated the loan early, due to former starter Ivor Pandur's departure. He soon established himself as the new starter under head coach Danny Buijs. Verrips missed the last few games of the 2023–24 season with an injury, as Luuk Koopmans took over.

On 18 July 2024, Verrips signed a contract with Dender EH in Belgium for two years with an option for a third.

== International career ==
Verrips has represented the Netherlands at both under-19 and under-20 level.

== Career statistics ==
As of match played 14 April 2024

Appearances and goals by club, season and competition
Club	Season	League			National cup		League cup		Other		Total	
Club	Season	Division	Apps	Goals	Apps	Goals	Apps	Goals	Apps	Goals	Apps	Goals
Jong Twente	2014–15	Eerste Divisie	0	0	—		—		—		0	0
Twente	2015–16	Eredivisie	0	0	0	0	—		—		0	0
Jong Sparta	2016–17	Tweede Divisie	13	0	—		—		—		13	0
Sparta Rotterdam	2016–17	Eredivisie	1	0	0	0	—		—		1	0
Maastricht (loan)	2017–18	Eerste Divisie	38	0	1	0	—		2 (Note: Appearances in Eredivisie play-offs)	0	40	0
Mechelen	2018–19	Belgian First Division B	27	0	7	0	—		1 (Note: Appearances in Belgian Super Cup)	0	35	0
Sheffield United	2019–20	Premier League	0	0	1	0	0	0	—		1	0
Sheffield United	2020–21	Premier League	0	0	0	0	0	0	—		0	0
Sheffield United	2021–22	EFL Championship	1	0	0	0	2	0	—		3	0
Sheffield United	Total		1	0	1	0	2	0	0	0	4	0
Emmen (loan)	2020–21	Eredivisie	14	0	0	0	—		1	0	15	0
Fortuna Sittard (loan)	2021–22	Eredivisie	2	0	0	0	—		—		2	0
Fortuna Sittard	2022–23	Eredivisie	0	0	0	0	—		—		0	0
Fortuna Sittard	2023–24	Eredivisie	12	0	2	0	—		—		14	0
Fortuna Sittard	Total		12	0	2	0	—		—		14	0
Groningen (loan)	2022–23	Eredivisie	24	0	1	0	—		—		25	0
Groningen (loan)	2023–24	Eerste Divisie	10	0	0	0	—		—		10	0
Groningen (loan)	Total		34	0	1	0	0	0	0	0	35	0
Career total			142	0	12	0	2	0	4	0	160	0

== Honours ==
Mechelen

- Belgian First Division B: 2018–19
- Belgian Cup: 2018–19
