= Dimitrios Siovas =

Greek footballer (born 1988)

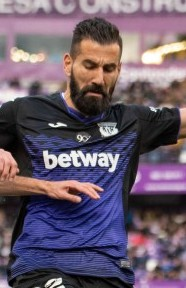
- Siovas with Leganés in 2018

Personal information
- Date of birth: 16 September 1988 (age 38)
- Place of birth: Drama, Greece
- Height: 1.92 m (6 ft 3 1/2 in)
- Positions: Centre-back; forward

Team information
- Current team: Pannaxiakos

Youth career
- Skoda Xanthi

Senior career*
Years	Team	Apps	(Gls)
2008–2012	Panionios	72	(2)
2009	→ Ionikos (loan)	11	(0)
2012–2017	Olympiacos	68	(2)
2017	→ Leganés (loan)	16	(1)
2017–2020	Leganés	82	(2)
2020–2021	Huesca	36	(2)
2022–2024	Fortuna Sittard	63	(2)
2024–2025	Lamia	10	(0)
2025–2026	Olympiacos B	2	(0)
2026–	Pannaxiakos	14	(11)

International career
2006–2008	Greece U19	9	(1)
2008–2010	Greece U21	14	(1)
2012–2020	Greece	20	(1)
Medal record
Men's football
Representing Greece
UEFA European Under-19 Championship
Runner-up	2007 Austria
- * Club domestic league appearances and goals as of 18 April 2026

Dimitrios Siovas (Greek: Δημήτριος Σιόβας; born 16 September 1988) is a Greek professional footballer who plays as a centre-back for Pannaxiakos. A defender throughout his career, Siovas also plays as a striker for Pannaxiakos since 2026.

== Club career ==
=== Early career & Panionios ===
Siovas was born and raised in Drama, Greece and played in the local teams before he was scouted from Skoda Xanthi. He started his career at the youth team of Skoda Xanthi, from where he moved to Panionios in 2008. He spend the second half of the 2008–09 season on loan to Ionikos, where he made 11 league appearances. Since 2009 he became a regular central defender for Panionios, making a total of 33 appearances and scoring 2 goals during his last season with Neosmyrniotes.

=== Olympiacos ===
On 15 June 2012, it was announced that Siovas signed a four-year contract for Olympiacos, having agreed with the club since January of the same year. He scored his first goal against Levadiakos in a 4–0 home win. On 11 January 2014, Siovas during the daily training suffered a severe injury and Olympiacos are likely to be without Siovas for the rest of the season after the central defender underwent surgery on a broken right ankle. The player will be out of the club for the next four months according to doctors' estimations. Siovas, did not miss a minute of his side's UEFA Champions League group stage campaign. W"e are very sad with what happened to Dimitris because apart from his abilities on the pitch, we also like him very much as a person," said coach Míchel. "We will deal with the issue next week and check out if we need to make a signing to cover for his absence. We hope that he will make it in time for the World Cup but we probably won't be able to count on him for the remainder of the season."

In his debut season after his injury he helped his club to its 41st league title, the championship being sealed with five matches to go. Siovas began the 2015–16 campaign as the de facto leader of the Olympiakos defence. On 9 February 2016, Siovas in a winning 1–0 matchday against fierce rivals PAOK, reached 100 appearances with the club's jersey in all competitions, having the amazing undefeated percentage of 89%, one of the largest among Olympiacos players.

=== Leganés ===
On 23 December 2016, after a frustrating half season, Olympiacos defender is close to move to CD Leganés on loan until the end of the season, with a buyout clause of €4 million. Siovas had dropped down the pecking order at Olympiacos and the Greek giants were looking to offload him in the upcoming January transfer window. The Greek defender is very close to join Leganes on loan and the deal will be finalised imminently. On 29 December 2016, CD Leganés officially announced the signing of Greek international till the end of 2016–17 season. On 4 February 2017, he made as a starter his debut with the club in a 2–0 away loss against Atlético Madrid. On 9 April 2016, he scored his first goal in La Liga in a 2–1 away loss against rivals CA Osasuna.

On 19 June 2017, Siovas signed a permanent four-year deal with Lega, for a fee believed in the region of €3 million, whereas Olympiacos keep a 15% resale percentage. On 15 September 2017, he made his debut for the 2017–18 season. On 4 October 2017, in a 0–0 away draw against Atlético Madrid, the Greek international was selected among the best XI of the matchday, due to his outstanding performance. A week later helped his club to escape with a 2–0 win against Málaga CF and the Greek international was selected for a consecutive week among the best XI of the matchday.

During the 2017–18 season was the de facto leader of the Leganes defence, helping his club to make the best starting in the last decade. As a result of his outstanding performance was voted by the fans as a member of the best XI that ever wear the jersey of the club. On 1 February 2018, after the epic Copa del Rey qualification against giants Real Madrid Leganes scraped a 1–1 draw at home to Sevilla FC in their first leg semi-final matchup with the Greek defender scoring the only goal for his club. The Greek defender took full advantage of poor goalkeeping from the Sevilla custodian to head home from close range in the 56th minute canceling out Luis Muriel’s early goal. On 19 May 2018, in the last matchday of the season, he scored by cleverly controlled possession and slotted beyond stranded goalkeeper Pedro López, after an assist from Ezequiel Muñoz in a 3–2 home win game against Real Betis.

On 1 December 2018, he scored his first goal for the 2018–19 season, with a header after a corner from Óscar Rodríguez Arnaiz, giving the lead in a 4–2 away win game against Real Valladolid. On 17 April 2019, Siovas is ranked among Europe’s best centre backs this season for aerial duels won, with an 82% success rate according to CIES. The study by CIES pertained to Europe’s top five domestic leagues specifically and Siovas has won a whopping 105 aerial duels, losing just 23. This gives an 82% success rate, comfortably putting him in the top 10 in this category and the most efficient in La Liga. With one game remaining for the end of the season, Siovas was voted Leganes’ MVP for the 2018–19 season by the club's fans. This is yet another distinct honor for Siovas after being named to Leganes’ All-time Best XI last season. Siovas also ranked among Europe's best centre-backs this season in aerial duels won, with an 82% success rate according to CIES. Siovas began the 2019–20 season as the de facto leader of the Leganés defence. On 1 December 2019, Siovas suffers a severe bruise with hyperextension in his left knee in the 5th minute of an away La Liga game against Sevilla FC. The 33-year-old Greek defender leaves Leganes after 3,5 seasons, in which he has played 108 official matches, scoring four goals. He is the third foreign player to exceed one hundred official matches with Leganes, after Martin Mantovani and Gabriel Pires.

=== Huesca ===
On 17 September he became a new Huesca player, signing a two years' contract for a transfer fee of €1 million. His contract, which ran until 2023, was worth €1.1 million per year. On 26 September 2020, Siovas header gave his club an equalizer in a 1–1 away draw against Valencia. It was his first goal with the club. On 7 March 2021, Siovas scored an early equalizer in 14th minute, but Celta delivered a resounding 4–3 victory against his club effort to avoid relegation.

On 31 August 2021, after the club's relegation, Siovas terminated his contract with Huesca.

=== Fortuna Sittard ===
On 30 January 2022, Siovas will continue his career in the Netherlands for the next six months. The 33-year-old center-back has reached an agreement with Fortuna Sittard for a contract until the end of the season, with the aim of helping to avoid relegation. After four years in La Liga, Siovas was released last summer, without finding a team to continue his career. The Spanish career played a vital role in the January transfer window to receive two offers from Segunda División clubs, namely Girona FC and Málaga CF. On 12 February 2022, Siovas scored his first goal with the club sealing a vital 1–0 away win against FC Groningen, in his club effort to avoid relegation.

== International career ==
Siovas was a member of the Greek under-19 team who reached the final of the 2007 European under-19 championship, losing 1–0 to Spain under-19. Since 2008, he was also a member of Greece under-21.

He was called by Greece's national manager Fernando Santos for a friendly match against Austria on 17 November 2010, but he remained on the bench.

He made his debut for the senior national team on 15 August 2012 in a friendly match against Norway. He is credited for being an aggressive yet skillful defender leading to a lot of praise by the Greek press.

He made his competitive debut for the senior national team on 16 October 2012 during Greece's 1–0 away win in Slovakia during the World Cup 2014 qualifying campaign. On 6 September 2020, Siovas escaped his marker inside the box, expertly collected Dimitris Giannoulis’ searching pass, twisting to a shooting position and turning his effort beyond the goalkeeper, helping Greece to take a two goals lead in a final 2-1 away Nations League win against Kosovo. It was his first goal with the national team.

On 20 September 2020, Siovas was informed of his exclusion from the national team's forthcoming fixtures by manager John van' t Schip, on grounds of the player publicly questioning the manager's decision against recalling Sokratis Papastathopoulos and Kostas Manolas to the squad. On 20 April 2021, in an interview for a Greek sports broadcaster, he openly declared that he wouldn't return to the national side under the Dutch manager's reign.

== Career statistics ==
=== Club ===
As of 22 November 2026

Club	Season	League			Cup		Europe		Total	
Club	Season	Division	Apps	Goals	Apps	Goals	Apps	Goals	Apps	Goals
Panionios	2008–09	Super League Greece	1	0	–		–		1	0
Panionios	2009–10	Super League Greece	15	0	–		–		15	0
Panionios	2010–11	Super League Greece	29	2	1	0	–		30	2
Panionios	2011–12	Super League Greece	27	0	6	2	–		33	2
Panionios	Total		72	2	7	2	0	0	79	4
Ionikos (loan)	2008–09	Super League Greece 2	11	0	–		–		11	0
Olympiacos	2012–13	Super League Greece	15	2	6	1	4	0	25	3
Olympiacos	2013–14	Super League Greece	11	0	1	0	6	0	18	0
Olympiacos	2014–15	Super League Greece	20	0	8	0	3	0	31	0
Olympiacos	2015–16	Super League Greece	22	0	3	0	6	0	31	0
Olympiacos	2016–17	Super League Greece	0	0	1	0	1	0	2	0
Olympiacos	Total		68	2	19	1	20	0	107	3
Leganés (loan)	2016–17	La Liga	16	1	0	0	–		16	1
Leganés	2017–18	La Liga	24	1	6	1	–		30	2
Leganés	2018–19	La Liga	34	1	3	0	–		37	1
Leganés	2019–20	La Liga	24	0	1	0	–		25	0
Leganés	Total		98	3	10	1	–		108	4
Huesca	2020–21	La Liga	36	2	0	0	–		36	2
Fortuna Sittard	2021–22	Eredivisie	12	1	0	0	–		12	1
Fortuna Sittard	2022–23	Eredivisie	24	1	0	0	–		24	1
Fortuna Sittard	2023–24	Eredivisie	21	0	2	0	–		23	0
Fortuna Sittard	Total		57	2	2	0	–		59	2
Lamia	2024–25	Super League Greece	10	0	–		–		10	0
Olympiacos B	2025–26	Super League Greece 2	2	0	–		–		2	0
Pannaxiakos	2025–26	Cyclades FCA First Division	8	10	0	0	–		8	10
Pannaxiakos	2026–27	Gamma Ethniki	6	1	1	0	–		7	1
Pannaxiakos	Total		14	11	1	0	–		15	11
Career total			368	21	39	4	20	0	427	25

=== International ===
Appearances and goals by national team and year
National team	Year	Apps	Goals
Greece	2012	2	0
Greece	2013	6	0
Greece	2014	0	0
Greece	2015	2	0
Greece	2016	2	0
Greece	2017	0	0
Greece	2018	1	0
Greece	2019	5	0
Greece	2020	2	1
Total		20	1

Scores and results list Greece's goal tally first.

No.	Date	Venue	Opponent	Score	Result	Competition
1.	6 September 2020	Fadil Vokrri Stadium, Pristina, Kosovo	Kosovo	2–0	2–1	2020–21 UEFA Nations League C

== Honours ==
Olympiacos

- Super League Greece: 2012–13, 2013–14, 2014–15, 2015–16
- Greek Cup: 2012–13, 2014–15

Pannaxiakos

- Cyclades FCA First Division: 2025–26
- Cyclades FCA Cup: 2025–26

Greece U19

- UEFA European Under-19 Championship runner-up: 2007

Individual

- Super League Greece Team of the Season: 2014–15
