= Yiğit Emre Çeltik =

Turkish footballer

Personal information
- Date of birth: 7 April 2003 (age 23)
- Place of birth: İzmir, Turkey
- Height: 1.65 m (5 ft 5 in)
- Position: Midfielder

Team information
- Current team: Kayserispor
- Number: 21

Youth career
- 2013–2015: Bucaspor
- 2015–2020: Altınordu

Senior career*
Years	Team	Apps	(Gls)
2020–2021	Altınordu	9	(0)
2021–2022	Fortuna Sittard	0	(0)
2022	→ Podbeskidzie (loan)	13	(1)
2022–2023	Podbeskidzie	22	(1)
2023–	Kayserispor	2	(0)
2024–2025	→ Arnavutköy Belediyespor (loan)	18	(2)

International career^{‡}
2017–2018	Turkey U15	7	(3)
2018–2019	Turkey U16	10	(0)
2018–2020	Turkey U17	13	(0)
2021–2022	Turkey U19	11	(3)
- * Club domestic league appearances and goals as of 24 September 2025 ‡ National team caps and goals as of 15:01, 8 July 2022 (UTC)

Yiğit Emre Çeltik (born 7 April 2003) is a Turkish professional footballer who plays as a midfielder for Süper Lig club Kayserispor.

== Career ==
A youth product of Bucaspor and Altınordu, Çeltik began his senior career with Altınordu in the TFF First League. He transferred to the Dutch club Fortuna Sittard on 27 July 2021. He made his professional debut with Fortuna Sittard in a 3–0 KNVB Cup win over TOP Oss on 27 October 2021.

On 12 February 2022, Çeltik joined Polish I liga side Podbeskidzie Bielsko-Biała on loan until the end of the season, with both an extension and a purchase option. On 8 July 2022, he joined the team on a permanent basis, signing a four-year contract. He left the club by mutual consent on 28 July 2023.

== International career ==
Çeltik is a youth product of the Turkey U15s, U16s, U17s, and U19s.
