= Arian Kastrati =

Kosovan footballer

Personal information
- Date of birth: 15 July 2001 (age 25)
- Place of birth: Sittard, Netherlands
- Height: 1.94 m (6 ft 4 in)
- Position: Centre-forward

Team information
- Current team: Union Titus Pétange
- Number: 9

Youth career
- 2004–2012: VV Sittard
- 2012–2015: VV DVO
- 2015–2017: Fortuna Sittard

Senior career*
Years	Team	Apps	(Gls)
2017–2022	Fortuna Sittard	6	(0)
2021–2022	→ Dekani (loan)	12	(3)
2022	→ MVV (loan)	13	(2)
2022–2024	Farense	0	(0)
2025–	Union Titus Pétange	9	(1)

International career^{‡}
2021–	Kosovo U21	1	(0)
- * Club domestic league appearances and goals as of 13 June 2026 ‡ National team caps and goals as of 26 March 2021

Arian Kastrati (born 15 July 2001) is a professional footballer who plays as a centre-forward for Union Titus Pétange in Luxembourg. Born in the Netherlands, he has represented Kosovo at under-21 international level.

== Club career ==
=== Early career and Fortuna Sittard ===
Kastrati started playing football at the age of 3 in VV Sittard, where after eight years he transferred to VV DVO. After a successful season with VV DVO, Kastrati was invited to be part of Fortuna Sittard. On 1 September 2017, he was named as a Fortuna Sittard substitute for the first time in a Eerste Divisie match against Almere City. His debut with Fortuna Sittard came on 10 January 2021 in a Eredivisie match against Heerenveen after coming on as a substitute in the 90th minute in place of Emil Hansson.

==== Loan to MVV ====
On 9 January 2022, Kastrati joined MVV on loan until the end of the season, with an option to buy.

=== Farense ===
On 18 August 2022, Kastrati signed with Farense in Portugal, and was initially assigned to the club's Under-23 squad.

== International career ==
On 15 March 2021, Kastrati received a call-up from Kosovo U21 for the friendly matches against Qatar U23. Eleven days later, he made his debut with Kosovo U21 in first match against Qatar U23 after being named in the starting line-up.

== Personal life ==
Born and raised in the Netherlands, Kastrati is of Kosovo Albanian descent.
