= Fortuna Sittard Stadion =

Football stadium in Sittard, Netherlands

Coordinates: 50°59′31″N 5°50′37″E

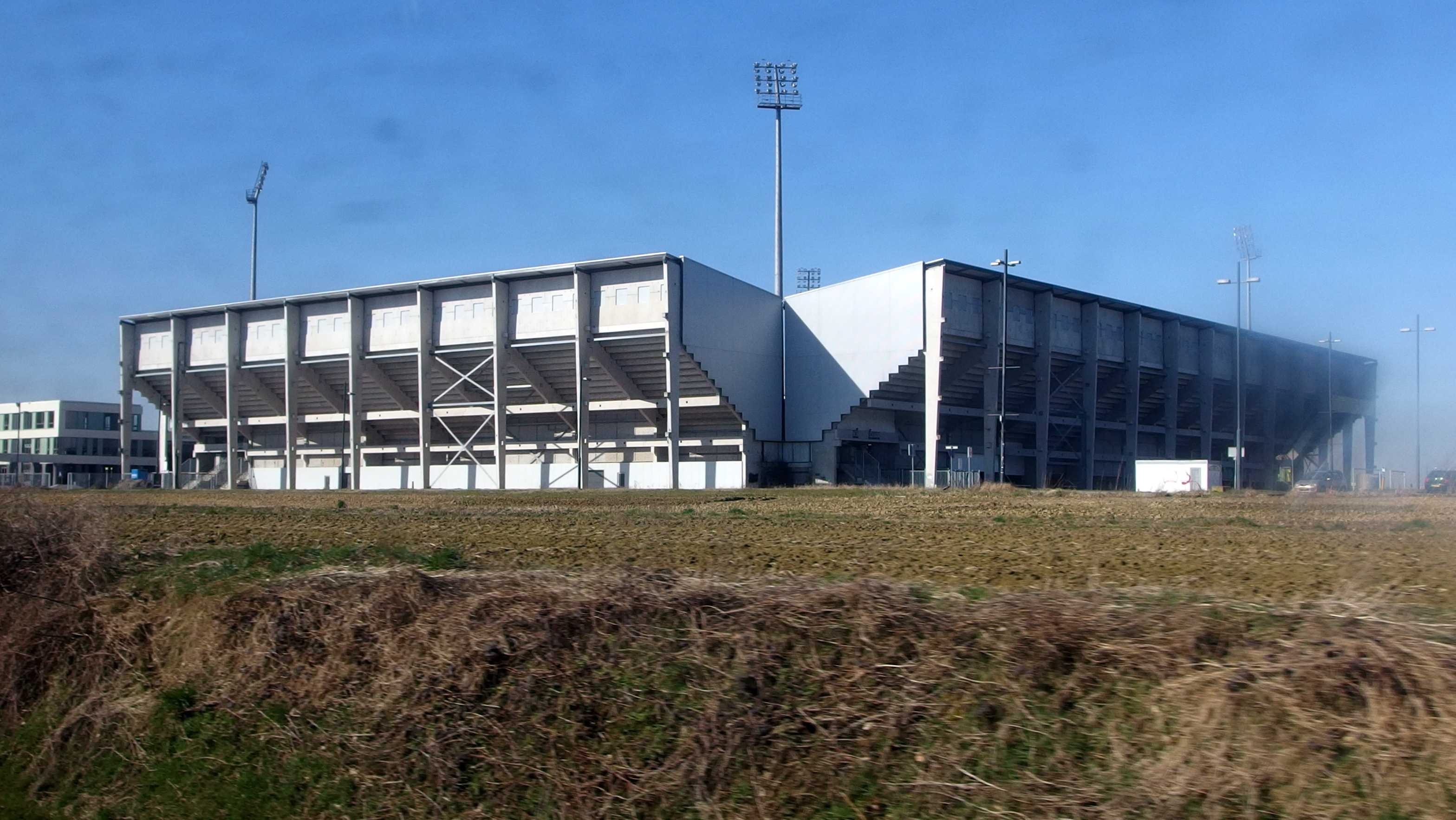
- Exterior view of the stadium
- Interactive map of Fortuna Sittard Stadion
- Full name: Fortuna Sittard Stadion
- Former names: Wagner & Partners Stadion (1999–2008); Fortuna Stadion (2008–2009); Trendwork Arena (2009–2013); Offermans Joosten Stadion (2013–2014)
- Location: Milaanstraat 120, 6135 LH Sittard, Netherlands
- Owner: Municipality Sittard
- Capacity: 12,000

Construction
- Opened: 14 November 1999
- Cost: 30 mln Dutch guilders

Tenant
- Fortuna Sittard

The Fortuna Sittard Stadion (Dutch pronunciation: [fɔrˌtynaː ˈsɪtɑrt ˌstaːdijɔn]) is a 12,000-capacity multi-use stadium on the Milaanstraat, Sittard, Netherlands. Currently used mostly for football matches, it is the home stadium of Fortuna Sittard. Built on the site of an industrial estate in 1999, it replaced Fortuna Sittard's former stadium, De Baandert. A multi-storey car park with 800 spaces is located under the stadium, as well as two additional parking spaces in the immediate vicinity.

In 2013, they began to expand the stadium with an extra sports centre next to it, a new hotel, a discount supermarket in the stadium and a whole new look.

== See also ==
- List of football stadiums in the Netherlands
- Lists of stadiums
