= Roel Janssen =

Dutch footballer (born 1990)

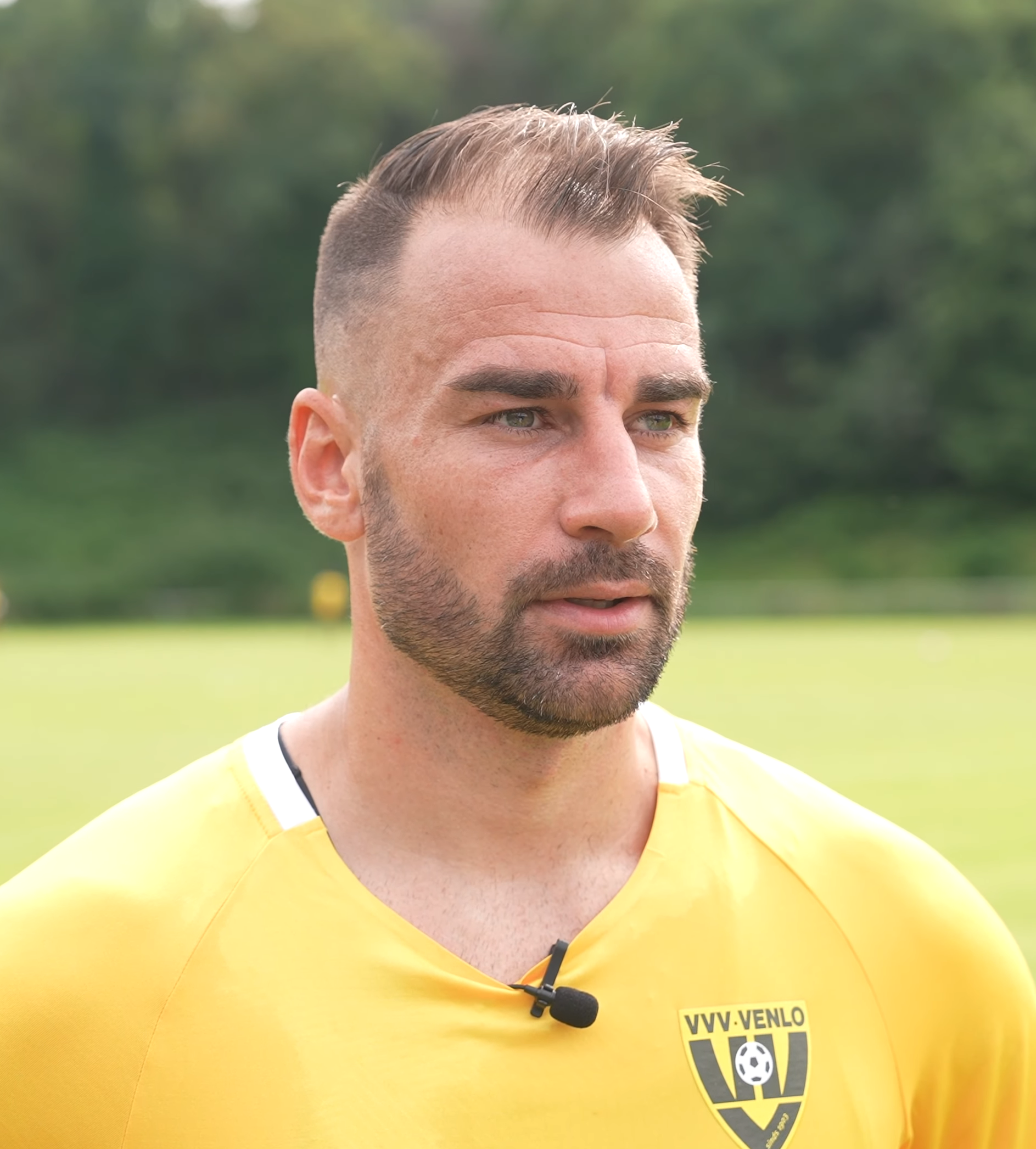
- Janssen in 2023

Personal information
- Date of birth: 16 June 1990 (age 36)
- Place of birth: Venlo, Netherlands
- Height: 1.79 m (5 ft 10 in)
- Positions: Centre-back; left-back

Team information
- Current team: VVV-Venlo
- Number: 3

Youth career
- 1995–1998: Venlosche Boys
- 1998–2011: VVV-Venlo

Senior career*
Years	Team	Apps	(Gls)
2011–2016	Fortuna Sittard	131	(16)
2016–2020	VVV-Venlo	103	(1)
2020–2023	Fortuna Sittard	52	(0)
2023–2025	VVV-Venlo	45	(0)
- * Club domestic league appearances and goals as of 15 May 2025

Roel Janssen (born 16 June 1990) is a Dutch professional footballer who plays as a centre-back. He formerly played for VVV-Venlo and Fortuna Sittard.

== Career ==
Janssen was born in Venlo, Netherlands, and began his football career at Venlosche Boys, his hometown club. He moved on to VVV-Venlo, but his contract expired in 2011 before he could make his debut for the first team.

On 9 June 2011, Janssen signed with regional rivals Fortuna Sittard, and he made his professional debut as a substitute for Tim Dreesen in an Eerste Divisie match against FC Oss on 23 September 2011. A few months later, in December 2011, he signed a contract with the club until 2013, with an option for another year. Janssen made eight appearances for Fortuna in his first season, but in the 2012–13 season, he became a regular starter and remained so throughout the season. His contract was extended for two more years in 2014. In January 2015, Janssen, now the team captain, was very productive, scoring the winning goals in games against MVV and Helmond Sport, and even scoring a hat-trick against rivals Roda JC. He finished the 2014–15 season with 10 goals in 36 games.

In June 2016, Janssen returned to his former club, VVV-Venlo, on a two-year contract. He became a key player in defense for VVV and helped them to promotion to the Eredivisie in his first season back, as the club won the second division title. His contract was extended for two more years in June 2018. However, in 2020, his contract with VVV was terminated.

On 21 April 2020, Janssen signed a three-year contract with his former club, Fortuna Sittard, as announced by the club.

On 10 August 2023, Janssen returned to VVV-Venlo on a one-year deal. He remained with the club through the 2024–25 season. Upon the expiry of his contract, VVV-Venlo opted not to renew, and Janssen left the club as a free agent.

== Career statistics ==
As of match played 21 December 2024

Appearances and goals by club, season and competition
Club	Season	League			KNVB Cup		Other		Total	
Club	Season	Division	Apps	Goals	Apps	Goals	Apps	Goals	Apps	Goals
Fortuna Sittard	2011–12	Eerste Divisie	8	0	1	0	—		9	0
Fortuna Sittard	2012–13	Eerste Divisie	27	0	1	0	2 (Note: Appearances in Eredivisie promotion/relegation playoffs)	0	30	0
Fortuna Sittard	2013–14	Eerste Divisie	33	1	1	0	2	0	36	1
Fortuna Sittard	2014–15	Eerste Divisie	34	9	2	1	—		36	10
Fortuna Sittard	2015–16	Eerste Divisie	29	6	1	0	—		30	6
Fortuna Sittard	Total		131	16	6	1	4	0	141	17
VVV-Venlo	2016–17	Eerste Divisie	34	1	2	0	—		36	1
VVV-Venlo	2017–18	Eredivisie	25	0	2	0	—		27	0
VVV-Venlo	2018–19	Eredivisie	23	0	0	0	—		23	0
VVV-Venlo	2019–20	Eredivisie	21	0	0	0	—		21	0
VVV-Venlo	Total		103	1	4	0	—		107	1
Fortuna Sittard	2020–21	Eredivisie	30	2	2	0	—		32	2
Fortuna Sittard	2021–22	Eredivisie	17	0	1	0	—		18	0
Fortuna Sittard	2022–23	Eredivisie	5	0	0	0	—		5	0
Fortuna Sittard	Total		52	0	3	0	—		55	0
VVV-Venlo	2023–24	Eerste Divisie	29	0	1	0	—		30	0
VVV-Venlo	2024–25	Eerste Divisie	14	0	0	0	—		14	0
VVV-Venlo	Total		43	0	1	0	—		44	0
Career total			329	17	14	1	4	0	347	18

== Honours ==
VVV-Venlo

- Eerste Divisie: 2016–17
