= List of Dutch football transfers summer 2020 =

This is a list of Dutch football transfers for the 2020 summer transfer window. Only transfers featuring Eredivisie are listed.

== Eredivisie ==
Note: Flags indicate national team as has been defined under FIFA eligibility rules. Players may hold more than one non-FIFA nationality.

=== Ajax ===
In:

No.	Pos.	Nation	Player
1	GK	NED	Maarten Stekelenburg (from (England) Everton)
5	DF	NED	Sean Klaiber (from Utrecht)
6	MF	NED	Davy Klaassen (from (Germany) Werder Bremen)
20	MF	GHA	Mohammed Kudus (from (Denmark) Nordsjælland)
39	FW	BRA	Antony (from (Brazil) São Paulo)

Out:

No.	Pos.	Nation	Player
1	GK	POR	Bruno Varela (loan return to (Portugal) Benfica)
3	DF	NED	Joël Veltman (to (England) Brighton & Hove Albion)
5	DF	NED	Kik Pierie (on loan to Twente)
6	MF	NED	Donny van de Beek (to (England) Manchester United)
8	MF	NED	Carel Eiting (on loan to (England) Huddersfield Town)
18	MF	ROU	Răzvan Marin (on loan to (Italy) Cagliari)
22	MF	MAR	Hakim Ziyech (to (England) Chelsea)
28	DF	USA	Sergiño Dest (to (Spain) Barcelona)
42	GK	NED	Benjamin van Leer (to Sparta Rotterdam)
49	FW	NED	Ryan Babel (loan return to (Turkey) Galatasaray)
—	DF	ARG	Lisandro Magallán (on loan to (Italy) Crotone, previously on loan at (Spain) Alavés)
—	FW	NED	Noa Lang (on loan to (Belgium) Club Brugge, previously on loan at Twente)

=== AZ Alkmaar ===
In:

No.	Pos.	Nation	Player
11	FW	SWE	Jesper Karlsson (from (Sweden) Elfsborg)
15	DF	NED	Bruno Martins Indi (on loan from (England) Stoke City)
16	GK	NED	Hobie Verhulst (from Go Ahead Eagles)
19	DF	NED	Juan Castillo (on loan from (England) Chelsea, previously on loan at Jong Ajax)
22	DF	NED	Timo Letschert (from (Germany) Hamburger SV)
26	DF	JPN	Yukinari Sugawara (from (Japan) Nagoya Grampus, previously on loan)

Out:

No.	Pos.	Nation	Player
5	DF	NED	Thomas Ouwejan (on loan to (Italy) Udinese)
11	FW	MAR	Oussama Idrissi (to (Spain) Sevilla)
16	GK	NED	Jasper Schendelaar (on loan to Telstar)
22	GK	NED	Rody de Boer (on loan to De Graafschap)
29	DF	NED	Joris Kramer (on loan to Cambuur)
30	DF	BEL	Stijn Wuytens (to (Belgium) Lommel)
—	MF	NED	Mees Hoedemakers (to Cambuur, previously on loan)
—	FW	CZE	Ondřej Mihálik (to (Czech Republic) Viktoria Plzeň, previously on loan)
—	DF	NED	Léon Bergsma (to (Switzerland) Aarau, previously on loan at Den Bosch)

=== Feyenoord ===
In:

No.	Pos.	Nation	Player
6	MF	NED	Mark Diemers (from Fortuna Sittard)
11	FW	NED	Bryan Linssen (from Vitesse)
20	MF	POR	João Carlos Teixeira (from (Portugal) Vitória Guimarães)
25	DF	SRB	Uroš Spajić (on loan from (Russia) Krasnodar)
27	FW	GER	Christian Conteh (from (Germany) FC St. Pauli)
—	MF	BEL	Francesco Antonucci (from (France) Monaco B, previously on loan at Volendam)

Out:

No.	Pos.	Nation	Player
6	DF	NED	Jan-Arie van der Heijden (to Willem II)
18	MF	TUR	Oğuzhan Özyakup (loan return to (Turkey) Beşiktaş)
20	MF	PER	Renato Tapia (to (Spain) Celta Vigo)
27	DF	NED	Rick Karsdorp (loan return to (Italy) Roma)
32	DF	POR	Edgar Ié (loan return to (Turkey) Trabzonspor)
—	MF	BEL	Francesco Antonucci (on loan to Volendam)
—	MF	IRL	Liam Kelly (loan extension to (England) Oxford United)
—	MF	NED	Wouter Burger (on loan to Sparta Rotterdam, previously on loan at Excelsior)
—	DF	NED	Calvin Verdonk (to (Portugal) Famalicão, previously on loan at Twente)

=== PSV Eindhoven ===
In:

No.	Pos.	Nation	Player
6	MF	CIV	Ibrahim Sangaré (from (France) Toulouse)
7	FW	ISR	Eran Zahavi (from (China) Guangzhou R&F)
11	MF	GER	Adrian Fein (on loan from (Germany) Bayern Munich, previously on loan at (Germany) Hamburger SV)
14	MF	NED	Marco van Ginkel (on loan from (England) Chelsea)
16	GK	GER	Vincent Müller (from (Germany) Würzburger Kickers)
27	MF	GER	Mario Götze (from (Germany) Borussia Dortmund)
31	DF	GER	Philipp Max (from (Germany) FC Augsburg)
38	GK	SUI	Yvon Mvogo (on loan from (Germany) RB Leipzig)

Out:

No.	Pos.	Nation	Player
6	DF	GER	Daniel Schwaab (retired)
7	FW	POR	Bruma (on loan to (Greece) Olympiacos)
11	FW	GRE	Kostas Mitroglou (loan return to (France) Marseille)
14	FW	NED	Sam Lammers (to (Italy) Atalanta)
17	MF	NED	Ibrahim Afellay (free agent)
21	GK	NED	Robbin Ruiter (to Willem II)
25	FW	JPN	Ritsu Doan (on loan to (Germany) Arminia Bielefeld)
31	GK	NED	Yanick van Osch (to Fortuna Sittard)
32	MF	CZE	Michal Sadílek (on loan to (Czech Republic) Slovan Liberec)
68	DF	SUI	Ricardo Rodríguez (loan return to (Italy) Milan)
—	GK	NED	Luuk Koopmans (to ADO Den Haag, previously on loan)
—	GK	NED	Hidde Jurjus (to (Germany) KFC Uerdingen, previously on loan at De Graafschap)
—	GK	NED	Jeroen Zoet (to (Italy) Spezia, previously on loan at Utrecht)
—	MF	BEL	Dante Rigo (on loan to ADO Den Haag, previously on loan at Sparta Rotterdam)

=== Willem II ===
In:

No.	Pos.	Nation	Player
1	GK	NED	Robbin Ruiter (from PSV)
6	DF	NED	Jan-Arie van der Heijden (from Feyenoord)
13	DF	NED	Leeroy Owusu (from De Graafschap)
15	FW	NED	Ole Romeny (on loan from NEC)
19	FW	GER	John Yeboah (from (Germany) VfL Wolfsburg, previously on loan at VVV-Venlo)
20	FW	GHA	Kwasi Okyere Wriedt (from (Germany) Bayern Munich II)
21	MF	BEL	Mike Trésor (from NEC, previously on loan)
26	GK	BEL	Jorn Brondeel (from Twente)
27	DF	GER	Derrick Köhn (from (Germany) Bayern Munich II)

Out:

No.	Pos.	Nation	Player
1	GK	GER	Timon Wellenreuther (to (Belgium) Anderlecht)
2	DF	NED	Fernando Lewis (to Quick Boys)
12	GK	AUS	Michael Woud (on loan to Almere City)
13	GK	GRE	Giorgos Strezos (free agent)
15	DF	NED	Damil Dankerlui (to Groningen)
16	FW	GRE	Marios Vrousai (loan return to (Greece) Olympiacos)
22	DF	POR	João Queirós (loan return to (Germany) 1. FC Köln)
—	DF	CUW	Justin Ogenia (to Eindhoven, previously on loan)
—	MF	GER	Atakan Akkaynak (to (Turkey) Caykur Rizespor, previously on loan)

=== FC Utrecht ===
In:

No.	Pos.	Nation	Player
11	FW	NED	Eljero Elia (from (Turkey) İstanbul Başakşehir)
15	FW	AUS	Daniel Arzani (on loan from (England) Manchester City, previously on loan at (Scotland) Celtic)
19	FW	MAR	Mimoun Mahi (from (Switzerland) Zürich)
21	DF	NED	Django Warmerdam (from Groningen)
29	FW	FRA	Moussa Sylla (from (France) Monaco)
32	GK	GER	Eric Oelschlägel (from (Germany) Borussia Dortmund)

Out:

No.	Pos.	Nation	Player
1	GK	NED	Jeroen Zoet (loan return to PSV)
9	FW	FRA	Jean-Christophe Bahebeck (to (Serbia) Partizan)
17	DF	NED	Sean Klaiber (to Ajax)
19	FW	SWE	Kristoffer Peterson (loan return to (England) Swansea City)
20	DF	SEN	Lamine Sané (free agent)
21	FW	GHA	Abass Issah (loan return to (Germany) Mainz 05)
32	FW	CZE	Václav Černý (on loan to Twente)
36	MF	NED	Mitchell van Rooijen (on loan to Excelsior)
39	FW	GER	Jonas Arweiler (on loan to ADO Den Haag)
—	MF	GER	Rico Strieder (to PEC Zwolle, previously on loan)
—	DF	BIH	Dario Đumić (to Twente, previously on loan at (Germany) Darmstadt 98)
—	FW	NED	Patrick Joosten (to Groningen, previously on loan at Sparta Rotterdam)
—	FW	NED	Nick Venema (on loan to NAC, previously on loan at Almere City)

=== Vitesse ===
In:

No.	Pos.	Nation	Player
6	DF	DEN	Jacob Rasmussen (on loan from (Italy) Fiorentina, previously on loan at (Germany) Erzgebirge Aue)
7	FW	BEL	Loïs Openda (on loan from (Belgium) Club Brugge)
11	FW	ALB	Armando Broja (on loan from (England) Chelsea)
27	MF	GER	Idrissa Touré (on loan from (Italy) Juventus)
32	DF	GER	Maximilian Wittek (from (Germany) Greuther Fürth)

Out:

No.	Pos.	Nation	Player
1	GK	GRE	Kostas Lamprou (to RKC Waalwijk)
2	DF	NED	Julian Lelieveld (to De Graafschap)
3	DF	NED	Armando Obispo (loan return to PSV)
7	FW	NED	Jay-Roy Grot (loan return to (England) Leeds United)
9	FW	SLO	Tim Matavž (to (United Arab Emirates) Al Wahda)
11	FW	NED	Bryan Linssen (to Feyenoord)
20	FW	MLI	Nouha Dicko (loan return to (England) Hull City)
27	MF	BEL	Charly Musonda (loan return to (England) Chelsea)
28	DF	NED	Joshua Brenet (loan return to (Germany) 1899 Hoffenheim)
32	DF	NED	Özgür Aktas (to Fortuna Sittard)
38	MF	NED	Richie Musaba (to Fortuna Sittard)
—	DF	NED	Khalid Karami (free agent, previously on loan at Sparta Rotterdam)

=== Heracles Almelo ===
In:

No.	Pos.	Nation	Player
5	DF	GER	Marco Rente (from (Germany) Borussia Dortmund II)
9	FW	TUR	Sinan Bakış (from (Austria) Admira Wacker)
10	MF	NED	Rai Vloet (from Excelsior)
14	MF	USA	Luca de la Torre (from (England) Fulham)
18	FW	BEL	Ismail Azzaoui (free agent from (Germany) VfL Wolfsburg)
20	MF	DEN	Kasper Lunding (from (Denmark) AGF, previously on loan at (Norway) Odd)
21	GK	GER	Daniel Mesenhöler (from (Germany) Viktoria Köln)
22	DF	CRO	Mateo Leš (from (Croatia) Dinamo Zagreb)
23	DF	BEL	Noah Fadiga (from (Belgium) Club NXT, previously on loan at Volendam)
24	DF	GER	Elias Oubella (from (Germany) 1. FC Köln II)
31	MF	NED	Rohat Agca (from Twente youth)
37	FW	NED	Delano Burgzorg (from (Italy) Spezia, previously on loan)

Out:

No.	Pos.	Nation	Player
6	DF	BEL	Dario van den Buijs (to (Belgium) Beerschot)
9	FW	NGR	Cyriel Dessers (to (Belgium) Genk)
10	MF	BRA	Mauro Júnior (loan return to PSV)
14	MF	SYR	Mohammed Osman (to (Qatar) Al Kharaitiyat)
18	MF	NED	Jesper Drost (to PEC Zwolle)
20	DF	NED	Jelle van Benthem (to (Germany) SV Straelen)
21	MF	GER	Sebastian Jakubiak (to (Germany) 1. FC Magdeburg)
23	DF	GER	Maximilian Rossmann (to (Germany) Viktoria Köln)
24	FW	NED	Dabney dos Santos (to (Moldova) Sheriff Tiraspol)
25	FW	NED	Joey Konings (to De Graafschap)
27	MF	NED	Niels Leemhuis (to Excelsior'31)
29	MF	NED	Reuven Niemeijer (to Excelsior)
31	DF	GER	Stephen Sama (to Accrington Stanley)
52	MF	KAZ	Alexander Merkel (to (Saudi Arabia) Al-Faisaly)

=== FC Groningen ===
In:

No.	Pos.	Nation	Player
2	DF	SUR	Damil Dankerlui (from Willem II)
4	DF	NED	Wessel Dammers (from Fortuna Sittard)
5	DF	JPN	Ko Itakura (loan extension from (England) Manchester City)
9	FW	NOR	Jørgen Strand Larsen (from (Norway) Sarpsborg 08)
10	FW	NED	Arjen Robben (free agent)
14	FW	NED	Patrick Joosten (from Utrecht, previously on loan at Sparta Rotterdam)
17	DF	ESP	Miguel Leal (on loan from (Spain) Villarreal)
21	FW	NED	Alessio Da Cruz (on loan from (Italy) Parma, previously on loan at (England) Sheffield Wednesday)
24	GK	NED	Nigel Bertrams (from MVV)

Out:

No.	Pos.	Nation	Player
4	DF	NED	Mike te Wierik (to (England) Derby County)
9	FW	NED	Daishawn Redan (loan return to (Germany) Hertha BSC)
11	FW	SWE	Joel Asoro (loan return to (England) Swansea City)
16	GK	NED	Jan Hoekstra (on loan to Roda JC)
19	MF	DEN	Nicklas Strunck (on loan to (Denmark) Esbjerg)
21	DF	NED	Django Warmerdam (to Utrecht)
23	MF	AUS	Ajdin Hrustic (to (Germany) Eintracht Frankfurt)
28	DF	NED	Tapmahoe Sopacua (free agent)
29	FW	NED	Romano Postema (on loan to Den Bosch)
32	GK	NED	Marco van Duin (retired)
42	DF	NED	Deyovaisio Zeefuik (to (Germany) Hertha BSC)
—	DF	NED	Amir Absalem (to Roda JC, previously on loan at Almere City)
—	MF	NED	Tom van de Looi (to (Italy) Brescia, previously on loan at NEC)

=== SC Heerenveen ===
In:

No.	Pos.	Nation	Player
1	GK	NED	Erwin Mulder (from (England) Swansea City)
3	DF	NED	Jan Paul van Hecke (on loan from (England) Brighton & Hove Albion)
4	DF	URU	Joaquín Fernández (from (Uruguay) River Plate)
7	FW	USA	Ulysses Llanez (on loan from (Germany) VfL Wolfsburg)
8	FW	SWE	Benjamin Nygren (on loan from (Belgium) Genk)
9	FW	NED	Henk Veerman (from (Germany) FC St. Pauli)
10	MF	GER	Oliver Batista Meier (on loan from (Germany) Bayern Munich)
13	MF	BUL	Stanislav Shopov (from (Bulgaria) Botev Plovdiv)
15	MF	BEL	Sieben Dewaele (on loan from (Belgium) Anderlecht)
25	DF	POL	Paweł Bochniewicz (from (Poland) Górnik Zabrze)

Out:

No.	Pos.	Nation	Player
1	GK	NED	Warner Hahn (free agent)
3	DF	DEN	Daniel Høegh (to (Denmark) Midtjylland)
6	MF	NED	Hicham Faik (to (Saudi Arabia) Al-Faisaly)
8	FW	NGR	Chidera Ejuke (to (Russia) CSKA Moscow)
9	FW	DEN	Jens Odgaard (loan return to (Italy) Sassuolo)
10	MF	CRO	Alen Halilović (loan return to (Italy) Milan)
13	MF	NED	Jordy Bruijn (to NEC)
15	DF	VIE	Đoàn Văn Hậu (loan return to (Vietnam) Hà Nội)
16	DF	NED	Ricardo van Rhijn (to Emmen)
18	DF	NED	Sven Botman (loan return to Jong Ajax)
23	GK	POL	Filip Bednarek (to (Poland) Lech Poznań)
24	GK	NED	Trevor Doornbusch (to Telstar)
30	FW	NOR	Runar Espejord (on loan to (Norway) Tromsø)
—	MF	DEN	Emil Frederiksen (to (Denmark) SønderjyskE, previously on loan)

=== Sparta Rotterdam ===
In:

No.	Pos.	Nation	Player
—	DF	BEL	Michaël Heylen (from Emmen)
—	FW	GER	Lennart Thy (from PEC Zwolle)
—	FW	NED	Danzell Gravenberch (from Dordrecht)
—	FW	NED	Reda Kharchouch (from Telstar)
—	GK	NED	Benjamin van Leer (from Ajax)
—	GK	NGR	Maduka Okoye (from (Germany) Fortuna Düsseldorf II)
—	DF	NED	Tom Beugelsdijk (from ADO Den Haag)
—	DF	NED	Aaron Meijers (on loan from ADO Den Haag)
—	MF	NED	Wouter Burger (on loan from Feyenoord, previously on loan at Excelsior)
—	FW	GER	Mario Engels (from (Germany) SV Sandhausen)

Out:

No.	Pos.	Nation	Player
1	GK	ISR	Ariel Harush (free agent)
5	DF	NED	Lassana Faye (on loan to ADO Den Haag)
6	MF	BEL	Dante Rigo (loan return to PSV)
9	FW	NED	Patrick Joosten (loan return to Utrecht)
11	MF	NED	Mohamed Rayhi (to (Saudi Arabia) Al-Batin)
12	DF	NED	Khalid Karami (loan return to Vitesse)
13	FW	NED	Joël Piroe (loan return to Jong PSV)
14	DF	NED	Jurgen Mattheij (to (Bulgaria) CSKA Sofia)
19	FW	GER	Ragnar Ache (to (Germany) Eintracht Frankfurt)
—	DF	CUW	Suently Alberto (free agent)
—	DF	CUW	Bradley Martis (to (Slovenia) Celje)
—	FW	NED	Elayis Tavşan (to NEC, previously on loan at Telstar)

=== FC Emmen ===
In:

No.	Pos.	Nation	Player
1	GK	GER	Felix Wiedwald (from (Germany) Eintracht Frankfurt)
2	DF	NED	Collin Seedorf (from Eindhoven)
7	MF	SWE	Simon Tibbling (from (Denmark) Brøndby)
13	MF	GER	Behadil Sabani (from (Germany) Borussia Mönchengladbach II)
18	DF	CZE	Denis Granečný (on loan from (Czech Republic) Baník Ostrava, previously on loan at (Czech Republic) Dynamo České Budějovice)
22	DF	NED	Caner Cavlan (from Austria Wien)
24	MF	FRA	Lucas Bernadou (from (France) Paris Saint-Germain)
25	FW	BEL	Sekou Sidibe (from Jong PSV)
34	DF	NED	Ricardo van Rhijn (from Heerenveen)

Out:

No.	Pos.	Nation	Player
1	GK	SWE	Pontus Dahlberg (loan return to (England) Watford)
2	DF	BEL	Michaël Heylen (to Sparta Rotterdam)
7	MF	NED	Wouter Marinus (to ZZVV)
10	FW	SUI	Shani Tarashaj (loan return to (England) Everton)
12	FW	NED	Freddy Quispel (to (Germany) VfB Oldenburg)
15	MF	NED	Tom Hiariej (free agent)
18	DF	NED	Ruben Roosken (to TOP Oss)
21	MF	SUI	Filip Ugrinic (loan return to (Switzerland) Luzern)
24	DF	NED	Daniel Camara Bos (free agent)
25	FW	CUW	Jafar Arias (to VVV-Venlo)
27	DF	CRO	Leon Sopić (to (Croatia) Dinamo Zagreb II)
28	DF	NED	Lorenzo Burnet (free agent to (Denmark) HB Køge)
29	MF	SRB	Luka Adžić (loan return to (Belgium) Anderlecht)
30	MF	NED	Henk Bos (free agent)
31	MF	TUR	Kerim Frei (loan return to (Turkey) İstanbul Başakşehir)
39	DF	GER	Jan-Niklas Beste (loan return to (Germany) Werder Bremen)
—	GK	GER	Matthias Hamrol (to (Germany) Wehen Wiesbaden)

=== VVV-Venlo ===
In:

No.	Pos.	Nation	Player
3	DF	NED	Arjan Swinkels (from (Belgium) Mechelen)
4	DF	SUI	Roy Gelmi (from (Switzerland) Thun, previously on loan)
7	FW	NED	Guus Hupperts (from (Belgium) Lokeren)
8	MF	FRA	Zinédine Machach (on loan from (Italy) Napoli, previously on loan at (Italy) Cosenza)
9	MF	CRO	Ante Ćorić (on loan from (Italy) Roma, previously on loan at (Spain) Almería)
10	MF	NED	Vito van Crooij (from PEC Zwolle)
11	FW	GRE	Giorgos Giakoumakis (from (Greece) AEK Athens, previously on loan at (Poland) Górnik Zabrze)
12	FW	ARU	Joshua John (free agent)
23	MF	BEL	Nezar S’rifi (from (Belgium) Lierse Kempenzonen)
25	FW	CUW	Jafar Arias (from Emmen)
26	DF	GER	Lukas Schmitz (from (Austria) Wolfsberger AC)
27	FW	NED	Torino Hunte (free agent from Almere City)

Out:

No.	Pos.	Nation	Player
4	DF	NED	Roel Janssen (to Fortuna Sittard)
7	FW	USA	Haji Wright (to (Denmark) SønderjyskE)
8	MF	NED	Peter van Ooijen (to (Germany) KFC Uerdingen)
10	MF	NED	Johnatan Opoku (to De Graafschap)
11	MF	GER	Richard Neudecker (to (Germany) 1860 Munich)
13	DF	GER	Nils Röseler (to (Germany) SV Sandhausen)
15	FW	ENG	Jerome Sinclair (loan return to (England) Watford)
19	FW	GER	John Yeboah (loan return to (Germany) VfL Wolfsburg)
20	MF	NED	Thomas Bruns (loan return to Vitesse)
29	FW	ALG	Oussama Darfalou (loan return to Vitesse)
31	MF	ENG	Lee Cattermole (retired)

=== FC Twente ===
In:

No.	Pos.	Nation	Player
5	DF	NED	Gijs Smal (from Volendam)
7	FW	CZE	Václav Černý (on loan from Utrecht)
8	MF	SRB	Luka Ilić (on loan from (England) Manchester City, previously on loan at NAC)
9	FW	BRA	Danilo (on loan from Jong Ajax)
10	MF	GRE	Lazaros Lamprou (on loan from (Greece) PAOK)
14	FW	SWE	Alexander Jeremejeff (on loan from (Germany) Dynamo Dresden)
15	DF	NED	Kik Pierie (on loan from Ajax)
21	FW	TUR	Halil Dervişoğlu (on loan from (England) Brentford)
23	DF	NGR	Tyronne Ebuehi (on loan from (Portugal) Benfica B)
24	DF	NED	Nathangelo Markelo (on loan from (England) Everton)
43	DF	BIH	Dario Đumić (from Utrecht, previously on loan at (Germany) Darmstadt 98)

Out:

No.	Pos.	Nation	Player
2	DF	NED	Paul Verhaegh (retired)
3	DF	NED	Xandro Schenk (to (Saudi Arabia) Al-Batin)
4	DF	NED	Calvin Verdonk (loan return to Feyenoord)
7	FW	ESP	Aitor Cantalapiedra (to (Greece) Panathinaikos)
8	MF	ESP	Javier Espinosa (free agent)
10	MF	SLO	Haris Vučkić (to (Spain) Zaragoza)
12	DF	ESP	José Matos (loan return to (Spain) Cádiz)
13	FW	JPN	Keito Nakamura (loan return to (Japan) Gamba Osaka)
14	FW	NOR	Rafik Zekhnini (loan return to (Italy) Fiorentina)
15	FW	DEN	Emil Berggreen (to (Germany) Greuther Fürth)
17	MF	GER	Tim Hölscher (free agent)
20	MF	ESP	Oriol Busquets (loan return to (Spain) Barcelona)
21	MF	GEO	Giorgi Aburjania (loan return to (Spain) Sevilla B)
25	DF	NED	Peet Bijen (to ADO Den Haag)
26	GK	BEL	Jorn Brondeel (to Willem II)
27	FW	NED	Noa Lang (loan return to Ajax)

=== PEC Zwolle ===
In:

No.	Pos.	Nation	Player
11	MF	NED	Jesper Drost (from Heracles Almelo)
13	MF	GER	Rico Strieder (from Utrecht, previously on loan)
25	MF	NED	Immanuel Pherai (on loan from (Germany) Borussia Dortmund)
27	FW	SRB	Slobodan Tedić (on loan from (England) Manchester City, previously on loan at (Serbia) Čukarički)

Out:

No.	Pos.	Nation	Player
7	MF	NED	Vito van Crooij (to VVV-Venlo)
10	FW	GER	Lennart Thy (to Sparta Rotterdam)
17	FW	NOR	Dennis Johnsen (loan return to Jong Ajax)
19	MF	NED	Rick Dekker (to De Graafschap)
23	DF	NED	Etiënne Reijnen (retired)
38	MF	NED	Gustavo Hamer (to (England) Coventry City)
—	FW	NED	Zian Flemming (to Fortuna Sittard, previously on loan at NEC)
—	FW	NED	Stanley Elbers (to (Romania) Hermannstadt, previously on loan at RKC Waalwijk)

=== Fortuna Sittard ===
In:

No.	Pos.	Nation	Player
1	GK	NED	Yanick van Osch (from PSV)
5	DF	NED	Roel Janssen (from VVV-Venlo)
8	FW	NED	Zian Flemming (from PEC Zwolle, previously on loan at NEC)
9	FW	GER	Sebastian Polter (from (Germany) Union Berlin)
10	MF	NED	Mats Seuntjens (from (Turkey) Gençlerbirliği)
11	FW	SWE	Emil Hansson (from (Germany) Hannover 96, previously on loan at RKC Waalwijk)
18	DF	NED	Mike van Beijnen (from (Turkey) Gençlerbirliği)
19	FW	ENG	Veron Parkes (from (England) West Ham United U18)
23	MF	NED	Ben Rienstra (from (Turkey) Kayserispor)
27	MF	COD	Samuel Moutoussamy (on loan from (France) Nantes)
33	DF	POL	Jarosław Jach (on loan from (England) Crystal Palace, previously on loan at (Poland) Raków Częstochowa)
35	DF	ENG	George Cox (from (England) Brighton & Hove Albion, previously on loan)
40	GK	GER	Joshua Wehking (from (Germany) Hamburger SV II)
—	DF	NED	Özgür Aktas (from Vitesse)
—	MF	NED	Richie Musaba (from Vitesse)

Out:

No.	Pos.	Nation	Player
3	DF	NED	Wessel Dammers (to Groningen)
5	DF	FRA	Grégoire Amiot (on loan to (Sweden) Falkenberg)
7	FW	FIN	Rasmus Karjalainen (on loan to (Sweden) Örebro)
8	MF	ESP	Álex Carbonell (loan return to (Spain) Valencia)
9	FW	GER	Bassala Sambou (on loan to (Denmark) Randers)
10	MF	NED	Mark Diemers (to Feyenoord)
15	DF	GER	Felix Passlack (loan return to (Germany) Borussia Dortmund)
17	MF	VEN	Carlos Faya (loan return to (Venezuela) Academia Puerto Cabello)
19	FW	ENG	Veron Parkes (on loan to Dordrecht)
20	MF	SEN	Amadou Ciss (to (France) Amiens)
25	DF	GRE	Dimitrios Ioannidis (on loan to (Germany) Sportfreunde Lotte)
26	MF	NED	Bo Breukers (to Groene Ster)
27	GK	NED	Rowen Koot (to Helmond Sport)
28	GK	SLO	Ažbe Jug (to (Slovenia) Maribor)
29	DF	FIN	Patrik Raitanen (to (Italy) SPAL youth)
34	MF	NED	Leandro Fernandes (loan return to (Italy) Juventus U23)
52	FW	DEN	Nikolai Frederiksen (loan return to (Italy) Juventus U23)
70	FW	BEL	Jacky Donkor (on loan to Eindhoven)
99	FW	MDA	Vitalie Damașcan (loan return to (Italy) Torino)
—	MF	NED	Luc Tinnemans (to EVV, previously on loan)
—	GK	NED	Job van de Walle (to Sportclub '25, previously on loan at Groene Ster)
—	MF	SRB	Lazar Kojić (to (Serbia) Proleter, previously on loan at (Serbia) Radnik Surdulica)
—	FW	HUN	Áron Dobos (to (Hungary) Szeged-Csanád, previously on loan at (Hungary) Győri ETO)
—	FW	POR	André Vidigal (on loan to (Portugal) Estoril, previously on loan at (Cyprus) APOEL)
—	DF	NED	Özgür Aktas (on loan to Dordrecht)
—	MF	NED	Richie Musaba (on loan to Dordrecht)

=== ADO Den Haag ===
In:

No.	Pos.	Nation	Player
1	GK	NED	Luuk Koopmans (from PSV, previously on loan)
3	DF	NED	Peet Bijen (from Twente)
4	DF	NED	Boy Kemper (from Jong Ajax)
5	MF	JAM	Ravel Morrison (from (England) Sheffield United, previously on loan at (England) Middlesbrough)
6	MF	BEL	Dante Rigo (on loan from PSV, previously on loan at Sparta Rotterdam)
7	DF	ROU	Andrei Rațiu (on loan from (Spain) Villarreal)
9	FW	GER	Jonas Arweiler (on loan from Utrecht)
10	MF	ISR	Ilay Elmkies (on loan from (Germany) 1899 Hoffenheim)
11	MF	BEL	Samy Bourard (from Eindhoven)
14	MF	NED	Kees de Boer (from (England) Swansea City)
15	DF	ITA	Dario Del Fabro (on loan from (Italy) Juventus, previously on loan at (Scotland) Kilmarnock)
17	FW	GRE	Nikos Karelis (free agent from (England) Brentford)
18	FW	GER	David Philipp (on loan from (Germany) Werder Bremen II)
20	FW	NED	Vicente Besuijen (from (Italy) Roma Youth Sector)
23	MF	ESP	Pascu (from (Spain) Valencia Mestalla)
31	FW	NED	Ricardo Kishna (from (Italy) Lazio)
34	FW	BIH	Amar Ćatić (from Jong PSV)
43	DF	NED	Lassana Faye (on loan from Sparta Rotterdam)

Out:

No.	Pos.	Nation	Player
2	MF	NED	Dion Malone (to NAC)
3	DF	SRB	Aleksandar Bjelica (loan return to (Poland) Korona Kielce)
4	DF	NED	Tom Beugelsdijk (to Sparta Rotterdam)
5	MF	ROU	Tudor Băluță (loan return to (England) Brighton & Hove Albion)
8	DF	NED	Aaron Meijers (on loan to Sparta Rotterdam)
9	FW	CZE	Tomáš Necid (free agent to (Czech Republic) Bohemians)
10	MF	NED	Lex Immers (to NAC)
12	DF	ENG	Jordan Spence (free agent)
15	DF	NED	Dehninio Muringen (on loan to Dordrecht)
16	MF	NED	Lorenzo van Kleef (on loan to Eindhoven)
17	MF	NED	Danny Bakker (on loan to Roda JC)
20	MF	ENG	Mark Duffy (loan return to (England) Sheffield United)
21	MF	WAL	George Thomas (loan return to (England) Leicester City)
23	FW	NED	Mick van Buren (loan return to (Czech Republic) Slavia Prague)
24	FW	ENG	Omar Bogle (loan return to (England) Cardiff City)
26	DF	ENG	Sam Stubbs (loan return to (England) Middlesbrough)
28	DF	BEL	Laurens De Bock (loan return to (England) Leeds United)
30	MF	NED	Erik Falkenburg (to Roda JC)
77	FW	CUW	Elson Hooi (to (Qatar) Muaither)
—	GK	NED	Mike Havekotte (on loan to MVV, previously on loan at Dordrecht)
—	DF	GHA	Robin Polley (loan extension to Dordrecht)
—	DF	NED	Hennos Asmelash (free agent, previously on loan at TOP Oss)
—	MF	NED	Thom Haye (to NAC, previously on loan)
—	FW	NED	Thijmen Goppel (to Roda JC, previously on loan at MVV)

=== RKC Waalwijk ===
In:

No.	Pos.	Nation	Player
4	MF	NED	Vurnon Anita (from (Bulgaria) CSKA Sofia)
6	MF	ISR	Nico Olsak (from (Israel) Maccabi Netanya)
7	FW	BEL	Cyril Ngonge (from (Belgium) Club Brugge, previously on loan at Jong PSV)
9	FW	NED	Finn Stokkers (from NAC)
11	MF	NED	Ola John (from (Portugal) Vitória Guimarães)
16	MF	MAR	Ayman Azhil (on loan from (Germany) Bayer Leverkusen)
20	DF	BEL	Thierry Lutonda (on loan from (Belgium) Anderlecht)
30	FW	GRE	James Efmorfidis (from Almere City)
31	GK	GRE	Kostas Lamprou (from Vitesse)
59	DF	BEL	Ahmed Touba (from (Belgium) Club Brugge, previously on loan at (Bulgaria) Beroe)
99	FW	MDA	Vitalie Damașcan (on loan from (Italy) Torino, previously on loan at Fortuna Sittard)

Out:

No.	Pos.	Nation	Player
4	DF	BEL	Hannes Delcroix (loan return to (Belgium) Anderlecht)
6	MF	NED	Daan Rienstra (to (Greece) Volos)
7	MF	NED	Tijjani Reijnders (loan return to AZ)
9	FW	NED	Mario Bilate (to NAC)
13	GK	NED	Kees Heemskerk (free agent)
14	DF	NED	Henrico Drost (to ASWH)
16	DF	NED	Ingo van Weert (to (Poland) Stomil Olsztyn)
17	FW	NED	Stanley Elbers (loan return to PEC Zwolle)
18	MF	BEL	Nando Nöstlinger (on loan to (Belgium) Lokeren-Temse)
23	MF	NED	Clint Leemans (loan return to PEC Zwolle)
24	FW	NED	Dylan Vente (loan return to Feyenoord)
25	DF	BUL	Stefan Velkov (loan return to Den Bosch)
27	FW	SWE	Emil Hansson (loan return to (Germany) Hannover 96)
29	DF	NED	Fabian Sporkslede (free agent)

== See also ==
- 2020–21 Eredivisie
