= 2019–20 Fortuna Sittard season =

Fortuna Sittard
2019–20 season
- Chairman: Özgür Işıtan Gün
- Manager: Sjors Ultee
- Stadium: Fortuna Sittard Stadion
- Eredivisie: 16th
- KNVB Cup: Round of 16
Home colours	Away colours	Third colours

During the 2019–20 season, Fortuna Sittard participated in the Eredivisie and the KNVB Cup. The season covers the period from 1 July 2019 to 30 June 2020.

== Squad ==
=== Squad information ===
As of 20 February 2020

Note: Flags indicate national team as defined under FIFA eligibility rules; some limited exceptions apply. Players may hold more than one non-FIFA nationality.

No.	Pos.	Nation	Player
2	DF	SUI	Martin Angha
3	DF	NED	Wessel Dammers (captain)
4	DF	SVK	Branislav Niňaj
5	DF	FRA	Grégoire Amiot
6	MF	NED	Jorrit Smeets
7	FW	FIN	Rasmus Karjalainen
8	MF	ESP	Álex Carbonell (on loan from Valencia)
9	FW	GER	Bassala Sambou
10	MF	NED	Mark Diemers
11	FW	FRA	Djibril Dianessy
12	DF	NED	Clint Essers
14	MF	SWE	Tesfaldet Tekie
15	DF	GER	Felix Passlack (on loan from Borussia Dortmund)
17	MF	VEN	Carlos Faya (on loan from Academia Puerto Cabello)
20	MF	SEN	Amadou Ciss

No.	Pos.	Nation	Player
22	MF	BEL	Adnan Ugur
24	MF	NED	Nassim El Ablak
25	MF	GRE	Dimitrios Ioannidis
26	MF	NED	Bo Breukers
27	GK	NED	Rowen Koot
28	GK	SLO	Ažbe Jug
29	DF	FIN	Patrik Raitanen
34	MF	NED	Leandro Fernandes (on loan from Juventus)
35	DF	ENG	George Cox (on loan from Brighton & Hove Albion)
44	DF	GRE	Lazaros Rota
52	FW	DEN	Nikolai Frederiksen (on loan from Juventus)
70	FW	BEL	Jacky Donkor
77	GK	MDA	Alexei Koșelev
99	FW	MDA	Vitalie Damașcan (on loan from Torino)

=== Out on loan ===
Note: Flags indicate national team as defined under FIFA eligibility rules; some limited exceptions apply. Players may hold more than one non-FIFA nationality.

No.	Pos.	Nation	Player
—	FW	CPV	Lisandro Semedo (at OFI until 30 June 2020)
—	MF	NED	Luc Tinnemans (at EVV Echt until 30 June 2020)
—	MF	SRB	Lazar Kojić (at Radnik Surdulica until 30 June 2021)

No.	Pos.	Nation	Player
—	GK	NED	Job van de Walle (at RKSV Groene Ster until 30 June 2020)
—	FW	POR	André Vidigal (at APOEL FC until 31 May 2020)
—	FW	HUN	Áron Dobos (at ETO FC Győr until 30 June 2020)

== Transfers ==
=== In ===
Date	Position	Player	From	Type	Fee	Ref.
1 July 2019	MF	(Finland) Rasmus Karjalainen	(Finland) Kuopion Palloseura	Transfer	Undisclosed	
1 July 2019	MF	(Belgium) Adnan Ugur	(Belgium) Club Brugge	Transfer	Free	
1 July 2019	DF	(Finland) Patrik Raitanen	(England) Liverpool FC	Transfer	Free	
2 July 2019	DF	(Germany) Felix Passlack	(Germany) Borussia Dortmund	Loan	Season Loan	
10 July 2019	MF	(Spain) Álex Carbonell	(Spain) Valencia CF	Loan	Season Loan	
12 July 2019	DF	(France) Grégoire Amiot	(France) Bourg-en-Bresse Péronnas	Transfer	Free	
16 July 2019	FW	(Moldova) Vitalie Damașcan	(Italy) Torino	Loan	Season Loan	
18 July 2019	FW	(Belgium) Jacky Donkor	(Belgium) Lokeren	Transfer	Free	
23 July 2019	FW	(Germany) Bassala Sambou	(England) Everton	Transfer	Free	
26 August 2019	DF	(Switzerland) Martin Angha	(Switzerland) FC Sion	Transfer	Undisclosed	
27 August 2019	DF	(Wales) Cian Harries	(England) Swansea City A.F.C.	Loan	Season Loan	
2 September 2019	MF	(Netherlands) Leandro Fernandes	(Italy) Juventus FC	Loan	Season Loan	
2 September 2019	DF	(England) George Cox	(England) Brighton & Hove Albion	Loan	Season Loan	
9 September 2019	MF	(Sweden) Tesfaldet Tekie	Free Agent	Transfer	Free	
30 January 2020	MF	(Venezuela) Carlos Faya	(Venezuela) Academia Puerto Cabello	Loan	Season Loan	
31 January 2020	FW	(Denmark) Nikolai Baden Frederiksen	(Italy) Juventus	Loan	Season Loan	
31 January 2020	DF	(Greece) Lazaros Rota	(Slovakia) MFK Zemplín Michalovce	Transfer	Undisclosed	

=== Out ===
Date	Position	Player	To	Type	Fee	Ref.
1 July 2019	GK	(Turkey) Aykut Özer	(Turkey) Fatih Karagümrük	Transfer	Free	
1 July 2019	DF	(Netherlands) Kai Heerings	Released	Transfer	Free	
1 July 2019	DF	(Belgium) Marco Ospitalieri	Released	Transfer	Free	
1 July 2019	MF	(Suriname) Gavin Vlijter	Released	Transfer	Free	
1 July 2019	DF	(Germany) Anthony Syhre	Released	Transfer	Free	
1 July 2019	MF	(Netherlands) Lars Hutten	(Netherlands) TOP Oss	Transfer	Free	
1 July 2019	FW	(Portugal) Lisandro Semedo	(Greece) OFI Crete	Loan	Season Loan	
1 July 2019	FW	(Netherlands) Finn Stokkers	(Netherlands) NAC Breda	Transfer	Free	
1 July 2019	MF	(Australia) George Mells	(Australia) Brisbane Roar	Transfer	Free	
1 July 2019	DF	(Netherlands) Calvin Mac-Intosch	(Netherlands) SC Cambuur	Transfer	Free	
9 July 2019	DF	(Belgium) Alessandro Ciranni	(Belgium) Royal Excel Mouscron	Transfer	Undisclosed	
3 September 2019	MF	(Martinique) Mickaël Malsa	(Spain) CD Mirandés	Transfer	Free	
20 December 2019	MF	(Albania) Agim Zeka	(France) Lille OSC	Transfer	End of Loan	
30 December 2019	DF	(Portugal) Mica Pinto	(Netherlands) Sparta Rotterdam	Transfer	Undisclosed	
31 January 2020	DF	(England) Cian Harries	(England) Bristol Rovers	Loan Return	Free	
14 February 2020	FW	(Hungary) Áron Dobos	(Hungary) Győri ETO FC	Loan	Season Loan	

== Pre-season and friendlies ==
Win Draw Loss

13 July 2019 Friendly	Bayer Leverkusen (Germany)	0–1	(Netherlands) Fortuna Sittard	Cologne, Germany
15:00 CEST (UTC+2)			Karjalainen 30'	Stadium: Jugendfussball-Zentrum Kurtekotten Platz 2 Attendance: 1,000

27 July 2019 Friendly	Fortuna Sittard (Netherlands)	1–5	(Greece) PAOK	Sittard, Netherlands
19:00 CEST (UTC+2)				Stadium: Fortuna Sittard Stadion

14 November 2019 Friendly	Fortuna Sittard (Netherlands)	1–1	(Netherlands) Helmond Sport	Ohé en Laak, Netherlands
14:00 CET (UTC+1)				Stadium: Sportpark Aan de Bosstraat

9 January 2020 Friendly	İstanbul Başakşehir (Turkey)	0–3	(Netherlands) Fortuna Sittard	Belek, Turkey
17:00 TRT (UTC+3)			Niňaj 4'; Ciss 46'; Passlack (yellow card) 51'; Diemers 54'	Stadium: Maxx Royal Hotel Field A

11 January 2020 Friendly	Antalyaspor (Turkey)	2–1	(Netherlands) Fortuna Sittard	Belek, Turkey
17:00 TRT (UTC+3)	Diego Ângelo 33'; Leschuk 34'		Donkor 72'	Stadium: Regnum Carya Golf & Spa Resort - Field 1

== Competitions ==
Win Draw Loss Fixtures

=== Overview ===
Competition	First match	Last match	Starting round	Final position	Record							
Competition	First match	Last match	Starting round	Final position	Pld	W	D	L	GF	GA	GD	Win %
Eredivisie	3 August 2019	10 May 2020	Matchday 1	16th	26	6	8	12	29	52	−23	23.08
KNVB Cup	31 October 2019	21 January 2020	First round	Round of 16	3	2	0	1	7	2	+5	66.67
Total					29	8	8	13	36	54	−18	27.59

Last updated: 6 March 2020
Source: Soccerway

=== Eredivisie ===
==== League table ====
Pos	Team	Pld	W	D	L	GF	GA	GD	Pts
14	FC Twente	26	7	6	13	34	46	−12	27
15	PEC Zwolle	26	7	5	14	37	55	−18	26
16	Fortuna Sittard	26	6	8	12	29	52	−23	26
17	ADO Den Haag	26	4	7	15	25	54	−29	19
18	RKC Waalwijk	26	4	3	19	27	60	−33	15

Source: eredivisie.nl
Rules for classification: Season in progress: 1) Most points won; 2) Less points lost; 3) Goal difference; 4) Goals scored; 5) Alphabetical order; End of season: 1) Points; 2) Goal difference; 3) Goals scored; 4) Head-to-head points; 5) Head-to-head goal difference; 6) Head-to-head away goals scored; 7) Play-off if relevant for deciding champion, relegation or participating in a European league, otherwise by draw. 8) Penalty shoot-out (only after a play-off)

==== Results summary ====
Overall								Home						Away					
Pld	W	D	L	GF	GA	GD	Pts	W	D	L	GF	GA	GD	W	D	L	GF	GA	GD
26	6	8	12	29	52	−23	26	6	4	3	22	17	+5	0	4	9	7	35	−28

Last updated: 6 March 2020.
Source: Eredivisie

==== Results by round ====
Round	1	2	3	4	5	6	7	8	9	10	11	12	13	14	15	16	17	18	19	20	21	22	23	24	25	26	27	28	29	30	31	32	33	34
Ground	A	H	H	A	H	A	A	H	H	A	H	A	H	A	H	A	H	A	H	A	H	A	H	A	A	H	A	H	A	H	A	H	A	H
Result	L	D	L	D	L	L	L	D	W	L	W	L	W	L	W	L	W	D	L	D	W	L	D	L	D	D	C	C	C	C	C	C	C	C
Position	17	13	15	18	17	17	17	17	17	17	16	16	14	15	14	14	14	13	14	14	13	14	14	16	16	16	16	16	16	16	16	16	16	16

Updated to match(es) played on 6 March 2020. Source: Eredivisie
A = Away; H = Home; W = Win; D = Draw; L = Loss

==== Matches ====
The Eredivisie schedule was announced on 14 June 2019. The 2019–20 season was abandoned on 24 April 2020, due to the coronavirus pandemic in the Netherlands.

4 August 2019 1	AZ	4–0	Fortuna Sittard	Alkmaar
20:00 CEST (UTC+2)	Vlaar 53'; Idrissi 55'; Boadu 59'; Sugawara 83'	Report		Stadium: AFAS Stadion; Attendance: 12,858; Referee: Dennis Higler

11 August 2019 2	Fortuna Sittard	1–1	Heracles Almelo	Sittard
12:15 CEST (UTC+2)		Report		Stadium: Fortuna Sittard Stadion; Attendance: 5,866; Referee: Kevin Blom

18 August 2019 3	Fortuna Sittard	2–3	Willem II	Sittard
12:15 CEST (UTC+2)		Report		Stadium: Fortuna Sittard Stadion; Attendance: 7,273; Referee: Allard Lindhout

31 August 2019 4	Heerenveen	1–1	Fortuna Sittard	Heerenveen
18:30 CEST (UTC+2)		Report		Stadium: Abe Lenstra Stadion; Attendance: 15,128; Referee: Edwin van de Graaf

15 September 2019 5	Fortuna Sittard	2–3	Twente	Sittard
16:45 CEST (UTC+2)		Report		Stadium: Fortuna Sittard Stadion; Attendance: 7,377; Referee: Dennis Higler

21 September 2019 6	Vitesse	4–2	Fortuna Sittard	Arnhem
20:45 CEST (UTC+2)		Report		Stadium: GelreDome; Attendance: 20,800; Referee: Joey Kooij

25 September 2019 7	Ajax	5–0	Fortuna Sittard	Amsterdam
20:45 CEST (UTC+2)	Promes 50', 68', 83', (yellow card) 82'; Neres 53'; Harries 77' (o.g.)	Report	Ciss (yellow card) 76'	Stadium: Johan Cruyff Arena; Attendance: 53,121; Referee: Jeroen Manschot

28 September 2019 8	Fortuna Sittard	0–0	Sparta Rotterdam	Sittard
20:45 CEST (UTC+2)		Report		Stadium: Fortuna Sittard Stadion; Attendance: 7,483; Referee: Richard Martens

6 October 2019 9	Fortuna Sittard	4–2	Feyenoord	Sittard
14:30 CEST (UTC+2)	Ciss 2', 34'; Harries 43'; Sambou 46'	Report	Haps 27'; Berghuis 66'	Stadium: Fortuna Sittard Stadion; Attendance: 8,511; Referee: Pol van Boekel

20 October 2019 10	Emmen	2–1	Fortuna Sittard	Emmen
14:30 CEST (UTC+2)		Report		Stadium: De Oude Meerdijk; Attendance: 8,130; Referee: Bas Nijhuis

26 October 2019 11	Fortuna Sittard	4–1	VVV-Venlo	Sittard
20:15 CEST (UTC+2)		Report		Stadium: Fortuna Sittard Stadion; Attendance: 8,388; Referee: Danny Makkelie

3 November 2019 12	Utrecht	6–0	Fortuna Sittard	Utrecht
14:30 CET (UTC+1)		Report		Stadium: Stadion Galgenwaard; Attendance: 18,776; Referee: Jochem Kamphuis

9 November 2019 13	Fortuna Sittard	1–0	ADO Den Haag	Sittard
19:45 CET (UTC+1)		Report		Stadium: Fortuna Sittard Stadion; Attendance: 8,223; Referee: Martin van den Kerkhof

23 November 2019 14	PEC Zwolle	3–1	Fortuna Sittard	Zwolle
19:45 CET (UTC+1)	Saymak 4'; Bel Hassani 65'; Thy 90+4'	Report	Damașcan 89'	Stadium: MAC³PARK Stadion; Attendance: 13,912; Referee: Joey Kooij

30 November 2019 15	Fortuna Sittard	1–0	Groningen	Sittard
19:45 CET (UTC+1)	Karjalainen 78'	Report		Stadium: Fortuna Sittard Stadion; Attendance: 7,632; Referee: Richard Martens

7 December 2019 16	PSV	5–0	Fortuna Sittard	Eindhoven
19:45 CET (UTC+1)	Doan 8'; Malen 26'; Bergwijn 42' (pen.); Ihattaren 52' (pen.); Gakpo 84'	Report	Essers (yellow card) 13'; Angha (yellow card) 52'; Cox (yellow card) 76'; Niňaj (yellow card) 79'	Stadium: Philips Stadion; Attendance: 33,300; Referee: Allard Lindhout

14 December 2019 17	Fortuna Sittard	3–2	RKC Waalwijk	Sittard
19:45 CET (UTC+1)	Diemers 13'; Damașcan 45', 58'	Report	Mulder 8'; Leemans 31'	Stadium: Fortuna Sittard Stadion; Attendance: 8,391; Referee: Jochem Kamphuis

21 December 2019 18	Willem II	0–0	Fortuna Sittard	Tilburg
20:45 CET (UTC+1)		Report		Stadium: Koning Willem II Stadion; Attendance: 13,587; Referee: Bas Nijhuis

18 January 2020 19	Fortuna Sittard	1–3	Vitesse	Sittard
18:30 CET (UTC+1)	Smeets (yellow card) 26'; Dammers (yellow card) 32'; Ciss 72'	Report	Bero (yellow card) 14'; Tannane 26'; Matavž 39', 64'; Lelieveld (yellow card) 89'	Stadium: Fortuna Sittard Stadion; Attendance: 8,238; Referee: Sander van der Eijk

25 January 2020 20	Sparta Rotterdam	1–1	Fortuna Sittard	Rotterdam
20:45 CET (UTC+1)	Piroe (yellow card) 63'; Mattheij 73'	Report	Damașcan 20'; Smeets (yellow card) 54'; Sambou (yellow card) 90+3'	Stadium: Sparta Stadion Het Kasteel; Attendance: 9,821; Referee: Dennis Higler

2 February 2020 21	Fortuna Sittard	2–1	Heerenveen	Sittard
14:30 CET (UTC+1)	Passlack 15'; Dammers (yellow card) 29'; Ciss (yellow card) 69'; Botman 74' (o.g.); Karjalainen (yellow card) 90+1'	Report	Van Bergen 6'; Van Rhijn (yellow card) 69'; Drešević (yellow card) 90+3'	Stadium: Fortuna Sittard Stadion; Attendance: 8,371; Referee: Ingmar Oostrom

7 February 2020 22	Heracles Almelo	2–0	Fortuna Sittard	Almelo
20:00 CET (UTC+1)	Mauro Júnior (yellow card) 8'; Merkel (yellow card) 11'; Dessers 33' (pen.), 70'	Report	Carbonell (yellow card) 24'; Cox (red card) 32'	Stadium: Polman Stadion; Attendance: 10,235; Referee: Björn Kuipers

15 February 2020 23	Fortuna Sittard	0–0	Emmen	Sittard
20:45 CET (UTC+1)	Passlack (yellow card) 45+1'; Smeets (yellow card) 50'; Niňaj (yellow card) 64' (yellow-red card) 90+5'	Report	Bijl (yellow card) 45+3'; Burnet (yellow card) 86'	Stadium: Fortuna Sittard Stadion; Attendance: 7,856; Referee: Jeroen Manschot

22 February 2020 24	Feyenoord	2–1	Fortuna Sittard	Rotterdam
19:45 CET (UTC+1)	Berghuis 52' (pen.); Boženík 71'	Report	Diemers 63' (pen.)	Stadium: De Kuip; Attendance: 46,016; Referee: Bas Nijhuis

29 February 2020 25	VVV-Venlo	0–0	Fortuna Sittard	Venlo
19:45 CET (UTC+1)	Post (yellow card) 16'; Janssen (yellow card) 40'	Report	Dammers (yellow card) 27'; Damașcan (yellow card) 64'; Passlack (yellow card) 85'	Stadium: De Koel; Attendance: 7,115; Referee: Danny Makkelie

6 March 2020 26	Fortuna Sittard	1–1	PEC Zwolle	Sittard
20:00 CET (UTC+1)	Frederiksen (yellow card) 13'; Cox 71'; Tekie (yellow card) 89'	Report	Koorman (yellow card) 37'; Hamer (yellow card) 86'; Thy 90' (pen.)	Stadium: Fortuna Sittard Stadion; Attendance: 10,071; Referee: Martin van den Kerkhof

13 March 2020 27	ADO Den Haag	Cancelled	Fortuna Sittard	The Hague
20:00 CET (UTC+1)				Stadium: Cars Jeans Stadion
Note: Match was initially scheduled for 13 March, but cancelled due to the COVID-19 pandemic in the Netherlands.

22 March 2020 28	Fortuna Sittard	Cancelled	PSV	Sittard
12:15 CET (UTC+1)				Stadium: Fortuna Sittard Stadion
Note: Match was initially scheduled for 22 March, but cancelled due to the COVID-19 pandemic in the Netherlands.

5 April 2020 29	Twente	Cancelled	Fortuna Sittard	Enschede
16:45 CEST (UTC+2)				Stadium: De Grolsch Veste
Note: Match was initially scheduled for 5 April, but cancelled due to the COVID-19 pandemic in the Netherlands.

12 April 2020 30	Fortuna Sittard	Cancelled	Utrecht	Sittard
14:30 CEST (UTC+2)				Stadium: Fortuna Sittard Stadion
Note: Match was initially scheduled for 12 April, but cancelled due to the COVID-19 pandemic in the Netherlands.

22 April 2020 31	Groningen	Cancelled	Fortuna Sittard	Groningen
16:30 CEST (UTC+2)				Stadium: Euroborg
Note: Match was initially scheduled for 22 April, but cancelled due to the COVID-19 pandemic in the Netherlands.

25 April 2020 32	Fortuna Sittard	Cancelled	AZ	Sittard
18:30 CEST (UTC+2)				Stadium: Fortuna Sittard Stadion
Note: Match was initially scheduled for 25 April, but cancelled due to the COVID-19 pandemic in the Netherlands.

3 May 2020 33	RKC Waalwijk	Cancelled	Fortuna Sittard	Waalwijk
18:30 CEST (UTC+2)				Stadium: Mandemakers Stadion
Note: Match was initially scheduled for 3 May, but cancelled due to the COVID-19 pandemic in the Netherlands.

10 May 2020 34	Fortuna Sittard	Cancelled	Ajax	Sittard
18:30 CEST (UTC+2)				Stadium: Fortuna Sittard Stadion
Note: Match was initially scheduled for 10 May, but cancelled due to the COVID-19 pandemic in the Netherlands.

=== KNVB Cup ===
31 October 2019 First round	Fortuna Sittard	3–0	ADO Den Haag	Sittard
20:45 CET (UTC+1)	Diemers 59' (pen.); Damașcan 61'; Zeka 76'	Report		Stadium: Fortuna Sittard Stadion; Attendance: 4,822; Referee: Siemen Mulder

17 December 2019 Second round	Fortuna Sittard	3–0	PEC Zwolle	Sittard
20:45 CET (UTC+1)	Sambou 17'; Karjalainen 43'; Lachman 71' (o.g.)	Report		Stadium: Fortuna Sittard Stadion; Attendance: 2,322; Referee: Christiaan Bax

21 January 2020 Round of 16	Fortuna Sittard	1–2 (a.e.t.)	Feyenoord	Sittard
20:45 CET (UTC+1)	Passlack 49'	Report	Ciss 43' (o.g.); Narsingh 120'	Stadium: Fortuna Sittard Stadion; Referee: Kevin Blom
Note: The match was suspended in the 63rd minute due to bad weather; the remainder of the match was played on 28 January 2020.
