= List of Dutch football transfers summer 2021 =

This is a list of Dutch football transfers for the 2021 summer transfer window. Only transfers featuring Eredivisie are listed.

== Eredivisie ==
Note: Flags indicate national team as has been defined under FIFA eligibility rules. Players may hold more than one non-FIFA nationality.

=== Ajax ===
In:

No.	Pos.	Nation	Player
16	GK	NED	Jay Gorter (from Go Ahead Eagles)
23	FW	NED	Steven Berghuis (from Feyenoord)
30	FW	DEN	Mohamed Daramy (from (Denmark) Copenhagen)
32	GK	NED	Remko Pasveer (from Vitesse)

Out:

No.	Pos.	Nation	Player
9	FW	MAR	Oussama Idrissi (loan return to (Spain) Sevilla)
16	GK	NED	Kjell Scherpen (to (England) Brighton & Hove Albion)
18	MF	NED	Jurgen Ekkelenkamp (to (Germany) Hertha BSC)
23	FW	BFA	Lassina Traoré (to (Ukraine) Shakhtar Donetsk)
28	DF	ARG	Lisandro Magallán (on loan to (Belgium) Anderlecht)
33	GK	CRO	Dominik Kotarski (on loan to (Croatia) Gorica)
—	MF	ROU	Răzvan Marin (to (Italy) Cagliari, previously on loan)
—	FW	NED	Noa Lang (to (Belgium) Club Brugge, previously on loan)
—	MF	NED	Carel Eiting (to (Belgium) Genk, previously on loan at (England) Huddersfield Town)

=== PSV ===
In:

No.	Pos.	Nation	Player
5	DF	BRA	André Ramalho (from (Austria) Red Bull Salzburg)
8	MF	NED	Marco van Ginkel (from (England) Chelsea, previously on loan)
9	FW	BRA	Carlos Vinícius (on loan from (Portugal) Benfica, previously on loan at (England) Tottenham Hotspur)
14	MF	NED	Davy Pröpper (from (England) Brighton & Hove Albion)
16	GK	NED	Joël Drommel (from Twente)
29	DF	AUT	Phillipp Mwene (from (Germany) Mainz 05)

Out:

No.	Pos.	Nation	Player
4	DF	NED	Nick Viergever (to (Germany) Greuther Fürth)
5	DF	GER	Timo Baumgartl (on loan to (Germany) Union Berlin)
9	FW	NED	Donyell Malen (to (Germany) Borussia Dortmund)
10	MF	NED	Mohamed Ihattaren (to (Italy) Juventus)
11	MF	GER	Adrian Fein (loan return to (Germany) Bayern Munich)
13	GK	GER	Lars Unnerstall (to Twente)
18	MF	NED	Pablo Rosario (to (France) Nice)
22	DF	NED	Denzel Dumfries (to (Italy) Inter)
29	FW	NED	Joël Piroe (to (England) Swansea City)
—	DF	NED	Derrick Luckassen (on loan to (Turkey) Fatih Karagümrük, previously on loan at (Turkey) Kasımpaşa)
—	MF	CZE	Michal Sadílek (on loan to Twente, previously on loan at (Czech Republic) Slovan Liberec)

=== AZ ===
In:

No.	Pos.	Nation	Player
1	GK	DEN	Peter Vindahl Jensen (from (Denmark) Nordsjælland)
4	DF	NED	Bruno Martins Indi (from (England) Stoke City, previously on loan)
9	FW	GRE	Vangelis Pavlidis (from Willem II)
15	DF	NOR	Aslak Fonn Witry (from (Sweden) Djurgården)
31	DF	NED	Sam Beukema (from Go Ahead Eagles)

Out:

No.	Pos.	Nation	Player
1	GK	NED	Marco Bizot (to (France) Brest)
2	DF	NOR	Jonas Svensson (to (Turkey) Adana Demirspor)
7	FW	NED	Calvin Stengs (to (France) Nice)
8	MF	NED	Teun Koopmeiners (to (Italy) Atalanta)
9	FW	NED	Myron Boadu (to (France) Monaco)
21	MF	NED	Kenzo Goudmijn (on loan to Sparta Rotterdam)
27	DF	SUR	Ramon Leeuwin (to Almere City)
40	DF	NED	Maxim Gullit (to Cambuur)
—	DF	NED	Joris Kramer (on loan to Go Ahead Eagles, previously on loan at Cambuur)
—	DF	NED	Thomas Ouwejan (on loan to (Germany) Schalke 04, previously on loan at (Italy) Udinese)
—	GK	NED	Jasper Schendelaar (to PEC Zwolle, previously on loan at Telstar)
—	GK	NED	Rody de Boer (to Roda JC, previously on loan at De Graafschap)

=== Vitesse ===
In:

No.	Pos.	Nation	Player
1	GK	GER	Markus Schubert (from (Germany) Schalke 04, previously on loan at (Germany) Eintracht Frankfurt)
11	FW	DEN	Nikolai Baden Frederiksen (from (Italy) Juventus B, previously on loan at (Austria) WSG Tirol)
19	FW	SUI	Julian Von Moos (on loan from (Switzerland) Basel)
20	MF	FRA	Yann Gboho (on loan from (France) Rennes)
22	MF	SUI	Toni Domgjoni (from (Switzerland) Zürich)
27	DF	FRA	Romaric Yapi (from (England) Brighton & Hove Albion)
33	GK	NED	Daan Reiziger (from Jong Ajax)

Out:

No.	Pos.	Nation	Player
11	FW	ALB	Armando Broja (loan return to (England) Chelsea)
19	FW	NED	Noah Ohio (loan return to (Germany) RB Leipzig)
20	MF	NED	Thomas Bruns (to (Turkey) Adanaspor)
22	GK	NED	Remko Pasveer (to Ajax)
23	GK	NED	Bilal Bayazit (to (Turkey) Kayserispor)
27	MF	GER	Idrissa Touré (loan return to (Italy) Juventus)
44	FW	ESA	Enrico Hernández (on loan to Eindhoven)

=== Feyenoord ===
In:

No.	Pos.	Nation	Player
2	DF	NOR	Marcus Holmgren Pedersen (from (Norway) Molde)
9	FW	IRI	Alireza Jahanbakhsh (from (England) Brighton & Hove Albion)
14	FW	ENG	Reiss Nelson (on loan from (England) Arsenal)
17	MF	NOR	Fredrik Aursnes (from (Norway) Molde)
18	DF	AUT	Gernot Trauner (from (Austria) LASK)
21	GK	ISR	Ofir Marciano (from (Scotland) Hibernian)
26	MF	NED	Guus Til (on loan from (Russia) Spartak Moscow, previously on loan at (Germany) SC Freiburg)
33	FW	NGR	Cyriel Dessers (on loan from (Belgium) Genk)

Out:

No.	Pos.	Nation	Player
2	DF	NED	Bart Nieuwkoop (to (Belgium) Union SG)
5	DF	SUR	Ridgeciano Haps (to (Italy) Venezia)
8	MF	NED	Leroy Fer (to (Turkey) Alanyaspor)
9	FW	DEN	Nicolai Jørgensen (to (Turkey) Kasımpaşa)
10	FW	NED	Steven Berghuis (to Ajax)
19	FW	SVK	Róbert Boženík (on loan to (Germany) Fortuna Düsseldorf)
21	GK	NED	Nick Marsman (to (United States) Inter Miami)
24	FW	ARG	Lucas Pratto (loan return to (Argentina) River Plate)
25	DF	SRB	Uroš Spajić (loan return to (Russia) Krasnodar)
27	MF	GER	Christian Conteh (on loan to (Germany) SV Sandhausen)
30	GK	NED	Ramón ten Hove (to (Denmark) Esbjerg)
33	DF	BRA	Eric Botteghin (to (Italy) Ascoli)
43	MF	NED	Achraf El Bouchataoui (on loan to RKC Waalwijk)
—	FW	NED	Marouan Azarkan (on loan to Excelsior, previously on loan at NAC Breda)
—	FW	NED	Dylan Vente (to Roda JC, previously on loan)
—	DF	SCO	George Johnston (to (England) Bolton Wanderers, previously on loan at (England) Wigan Athletic)
—	DF	NED	Sven van Beek (to Heerenveen, previously on loan at Willem II)
—	MF	IRL	Liam Kelly (to (England) Rochdale, previously on loan at (England) Oxford United)
—	MF	NED	Wouter Burger (to (Switzerland) Basel, previously on loan at Sparta Rotterdam)
—	FW	NED	Luciano Narsingh (free agent, previously on loan at Twente)

=== Utrecht ===
In:

No.	Pos.	Nation	Player
18	FW	GRE	Anastasios Douvikas (from (Greece) Volos)
20	DF	FRA	Arthur Zagré (on loan from (France) Monaco, previously on loan at (France) Dijon)
27	MF	NED	Quinten Timber (from Jong Ajax)
33	DF	NED	Mike van der Hoorn (on loan from (Germany) Arminia Bielefeld)

Out:

No.	Pos.	Nation	Player
3	DF	NED	Justin Hoogma (loan return to (Germany) 1899 Hoffenheim)
7	FW	NED	Gyrano Kerk (to (Russia) Lokomotiv Moscow)
11	FW	NED	Eljero Elia (free agent)
13	DF	SWE	Emil Bergström (on loan to Willem II)
16	GK	NED	Thijmen Nijhuis (on loan to MVV Maastricht)
20	DF	NED	Giovanni Troupée (to Twente)
24	MF	NED	Odysseus Velanas (to NAC Breda)
—	DF	GAM	Leon Guwara (to (Germany) Jahn Regensburg, previously on loan at VVV-Venlo)
—	MF	NED	Justin Lonwijk (to (Denmark) Viborg, previously on loan)
—	MF	NED	Mitchell van Rooijen (to VVV-Venlo, previously on loan at Excelsior)
—	FW	CZE	Václav Černý (to Twente, previously on loan)
—	FW	GER	Jonas Arweiler (to Almere City, previously on loan at ADO Den Haag)

=== Groningen ===
In:

No.	Pos.	Nation	Player
1	GK	NED	Peter Leeuwenburgh (from (South Africa) Cape Town City)
6	MF	NED	Laros Duarte (from Sparta Rotterdam)
8	FW	NED	Michael de Leeuw (from Emmen)
10	MF	SWE	Daleho Irandust (from (Sweden) Häcken)
12	DF	NED	Radinio Balker (from Almere City)
15	DF	SWE	Yahya Kalley (from (Sweden) Göteborg)
17	FW	TUN	Sebastian Tounekti (on loan from (Norway) Bodø/Glimt)
19	FW	SWE	Paulos Abraham (from (Sweden) AIK, previously on loan)
20	DF	CRO	Marin Šverko (from (Germany) 1. FC Saarbrücken)
21	DF	NED	Neraysho Kasanwirjo (from Jong Ajax)
27	FW	BEL	Cyril Ngonge (from RKC Waalwijk)

Out:

No.	Pos.	Nation	Player
1	GK	NED	Sergio Padt (to (Bulgaria) Ludogorets Razgrad)
5	DF	JPN	Ko Itakura (loan return to (England) Manchester City)
6	MF	NED	Azor Matusiwa (to (France) Reims)
7	MF	SWE	Ramon Lundqvist (on loan to (Greece) Panathinaikos)
8	MF	GER	Sam Schreck (on loan to (Germany) Erzgebirge Aue)
10	FW	NED	Arjen Robben (retired)
15	DF	SWE	Gabriel Gudmundsson (to (France) Lille)
17	DF	ESP	Miguel Ángel Leal (loan return to (Spain) Villarreal)
18	MF	MAR	Ahmed El Messaoudi (to (Turkey) Gaziantep)
21	FW	NED	Alessio Da Cruz (loan return to (Italy) Parma)
23	GK	NOR	Per Kristian Bråtveit (loan return to (Norway) Djurgården)
33	DF	NED	Joël van Kaam (on loan to Emmen)
34	FW	NED	Kian Slor (on loan to Emmen)
37	FW	NED	Thijs Dallinga (to Excelsior)
—	DF	NED	Thomas Poll (to Almere City, previously on loan at Dordrecht)
—	MF	DEN	Nicklas Strunck (to (Denmark) Esbjerg, previously on loan)

=== Sparta Rotterdam ===
In:

No.	Pos.	Nation	Player
5	DF	NED	Aaron Meijers (from ADO Den Haag, previously on loan)
7	MF	NED	Vito van Crooij (from VVV-Venlo)
8	MF	SYR	Mohammed Osman (free agent)
12	DF	LUX	Laurent Jans (from (Belgium) Standard Liège)
16	MF	NED	Kenzo Goudmijn (on loan from AZ)
17	DF	GRE	Giannis Masouras (on loan from (Greece) Olympiacos, previously on loan at (Poland) Górnik Zabrze)

Out:

No.	Pos.	Nation	Player
2	DF	CPV	Jeffry Fortes (to De Graafschap)
6	MF	NED	Laros Duarte (to Groningen)
8	MF	MAR	Abdou Harroui (on loan to (Italy) Sassuolo)
9	FW	NED	Danzell Gravenberch (to De Graafschap)
11	MF	NED	Deroy Duarte (to Fortuna Sittard)
15	MF	NED	Wouter Burger (loan return to Feyenoord)
17	FW	NED	Reda Kharchouch (on loan to Emmen)
30	GK	NED	Michael Fabrie (to Smitshoek)
—	DF	NED	Lassana Faye (free agent, previously on loan at ADO Den Haag)
—	FW	NED	Bradly van Hoeven (to Almere City, previously on loan at Go Ahead Eagles)

=== Heracles Almelo ===
In:

No.	Pos.	Nation	Player
4	DF	GER	Sven Sonnenberg (from (Germany) Hansa Rostock)
7	FW	TUR	Bilal Başaçıkoğlu (from (Turkey) Gaziantep)
11	FW	DEN	Nikolai Laursen (from Emmen)
12	DF	NED	Ruben Roosken (from TOP Oss)
16	FW	NED	Kaj Sierhuis (on loan from (France) Reims)
25	DF	GHA	Robin Polley (from ADO Den Haag, previously on loan at Dordrecht)
28	GK	NED	Robin Jalving (from Emmen)
34	GK	NED	Alessandro Damen (from Excelsior)

Out:

No.	Pos.	Nation	Player
2	DF	NED	Tim Breukers (retired)
4	DF	NED	Robin Pröpper (to Twente)
8	MF	NED	Teun Bijleveld (to Emmen)
16	GK	NED	Michael Brouwer (on loan to Emmen)
21	GK	GER	Daniel Mesenhöler (free agent to (Germany) Hallescher FC)
25	FW	TUR	Ahmed Kutucu (loan return to (Germany) Schalke 04)
34	DF	NED	Jeff Hardeveld (to Emmen)
—	FW	CUW	Jeremy Cijntje (on loan to Roda JC, previously on loan at (Belgium) Waasland-Beveren)

=== Twente ===
In:

No.	Pos.	Nation	Player
1	GK	GER	Lars Unnerstall (from PSV)
2	DF	NED	Giovanni Troupée (from Utrecht)
3	DF	NED	Robin Pröpper (from Heracles Almelo)
7	FW	CZE	Václav Černý (from Utrecht, previously on loan)
9	MF	COD	Jody Lukoki (free agent)
10	FW	NED	Virgil Misidjan (from PEC Zwolle)
13	FW	NED	Ricky van Wolfswinkel (from (Switzerland) Basel)
14	MF	NED	Michel Vlap (on loan from (Belgium) Anderlecht, previously on loan at (Germany) Arminia Bielefeld)
18	FW	GRE	Dimitrios Limnios (on loan from (Germany) 1. FC Köln)
23	MF	CZE	Michal Sadílek (on loan from PSV, previously on loan at (Czech Republic) Slovan Liberec)
26	FW	NED	Denilho Cleonise (from (Italy) Genoa)
27	FW	CRC	Manfred Ugalde (on loan from (Belgium) Lommel)

Out:

No.	Pos.	Nation	Player
9	FW	BRA	Danilo (loan return to Ajax)
10	FW	GHA	Abass Issah (loan return to (Germany) Mainz 05)
11	FW	NED	Queensy Menig (to (Serbia) Partizan)
16	GK	NED	Joël Drommel (to PSV)
20	MF	NED	Godfried Roemeratoe (on loan to Willem II)
23	DF	NGR	Tyronne Ebuehi (loan return to (Portugal) Benfica)
24	DF	NED	Nathangelo Markelo (loan return to (England) Everton)
25	FW	NED	Luciano Narsingh (loan return to Feyenoord)
37	MF	NED	Thijs van Leeuwen (on loan to Almere City)
—	MF	ALB	Lindon Selahi (to (Croatia) Rijeka, previously on loan at Willem II)

=== Fortuna Sittard ===
In:

No.	Pos.	Nation	Player
6	MF	NED	Deroy Duarte (from Sparta Rotterdam)
12	DF	POR	Ivo Pinto (on loan from (Croatia) Dinamo Zagreb, previously on loan at (Portugal) Rio Ave)
18	DF	NED	Nigel Lonwijk (on loan from (England) Wolverhampton Wanderers)
19	MF	GER	Arianit Ferati (from (Germany) Waldhof Mannheim)
21	MF	TUR	Yiğit Emre Çeltik (from (Turkey) Altınordu)
24	FW	FRA	Samy Baghdadi (from (France) Grasse)
25	DF	BEL	Mickaël Tirpan (from (Turkey) Kasımpaşa, previously on loan)
28	MF	IRL	Ryan Johansson (on loan from (Spain) Sevilla Atlético)
30	GK	NED	Ruben van Kouwen (from Jong NEC)
32	GK	GER	Felix Dornebusch (from (Germany) Eintracht Braunschweig)
39	FW	NED	Toshio Lake (from Jong Feyenoord)
77	FW	NED	Tijjani Noslin (from TOP Oss)

Out:

No.	Pos.	Nation	Player
4	DF	BEL	Dario Van den Buijs (loan return to (Belgium) Beerschot)
9	FW	GER	Sebastian Polter (to (Germany) VfL Bochum)
12	DF	NED	Clint Essers (to MVV Maastricht)
17	FW	GRE	Dimitrios Emmanouilidis (loan return to (Greece) Panathinaikos)
18	DF	NED	Mike van Beijnen (on loan to Den Bosch)
20	FW	NED	Arian Kastrati (on loan to (Slovenia) Dekani)
21	DF	FRA	Grégoire Amiot (free agent)
22	GK	NED	Piet Velthuizen (free agent)
24	MF	MAR	Nassim El Ablak (free agent)
27	MF	COD	Samuel Moutoussamy (loan return to (France) Nantes)
33	FW	NED	Leroy George (to De Treffers)
40	GK	GER	Joshua Wehking (on loan to MVV Maastricht)
44	DF	GRE	Lazaros Rota (to (Greece) AEK Athens)
55	MF	BEL	Thibaud Verlinden (to (Slovakia) DAC Dunajská Streda)
—	MF	BEL	Adnan Ugur (on loan to (Turkey) Fatih Karagümrük, previously on loan at Dordrecht)
—	DF	NED	Özgür Aktaş (to Telstar, previously on loan at Dordrecht)
—	MF	GER	Dimitrios Ioannidis (to (Germany) Rot Weiss Ahlen, previously on loan at (Germany) Sportfreunde Lotte)
—	FW	BEL	Jacky Donkor (to Dordrecht, previously on loan at Eindhoven)
—	FW	FRA	Djibril Dianessy (to (France) Pau, previously on loan at MVV Maastricht)
—	FW	POR	André Vidigal (to (Portugal) Marítimo, previously on loan at (Portugal) Estoril)
—	FW	FIN	Rasmus Karjalainen (to (Sweden) Helsingborg, previously on loan at (Sweden) Örebro)

=== Heerenveen ===
In:

No.	Pos.	Nation	Player
4	DF	NED	Sven van Beek (from Feyenoord, previously on loan at Willem II)
7	FW	SRB	Filip Stevanović (on loan from (England) Manchester City, previously on loan at (Serbia) Partizan)
11	FW	NED	Anthony Musaba (on loan from (France) Monaco, previously on loan at (Belgium) Cercle Brugge)
15	DF	NED	Nick Bakker (free agent)
22	GK	NED	Xavier Mous (from PEC Zwolle)
27	DF	NED	Milan van Ewijk (from ADO Den Haag)
29	MF	DEN	Nicolas Madsen (on loan from (Denmark) Midtjylland)

Out:

No.	Pos.	Nation	Player
2	DF	NED	Sherel Floranus (to (Turkey) Antalyaspor)
3	DF	NED	Jan Paul van Hecke (loan return to (England) Brighton & Hove Albion)
7	FW	USA	Ulysses Llanez (loan return to (Germany) VfL Wolfsburg)
10	MF	GER	Oliver Batista Meier (loan return to (Germany) Bayern Munich)
11	FW	NED	Mitchell van Bergen (to (France) Reims)
15	MF	BEL	Sieben Dewaele (loan return to (Belgium) Anderlecht)
22	GK	ISR	Ariel Harush (to (Israel) Hapoel Beer Sheva)
26	FW	NED	Rein Smit (to Telstar)
43	MF	NED	Lasse Schöne (to NEC)

=== PEC Zwolle ===
In:

No.	Pos.	Nation	Player
1	GK	GRE	Kostas Lamprou (from RKC Waalwijk)
3	DF	BEL	Siemen Voet (from (Belgium) Club Brugge, previously on loan at (Belgium) Mechelen)
7	FW	CUW	Gervane Kastaneer (from (England) Coventry City, previously on loan at (Scotland) Hearts)
11	MF	SRB	Luka Adžić (from (Belgium) Anderlecht, previously on loan at Emmen)
14	MF	NED	Leandro Fernandes (free agent)
16	GK	NED	Jasper Schendelaar (from AZ, previously on loan at Telstar)
19	FW	NED	Daishawn Redan (on loan from (Germany) Hertha BSC)
27	DF	LBR	Mark Pabai (from Jong Utrecht)
34	DF	NED	Mees de Wit (from (Portugal) Sporting B)
37	MF	SUR	Ryan Koolwijk (free agent)

Out:

No.	Pos.	Nation	Player
1	GK	NED	Xavier Mous (to Heerenveen)
3	DF	FIN	Thomas Lam (to (Bulgaria) CSKA Sofia)
7	FW	NED	Virgil Misidjan (to Twente)
8	FW	IRI	Reza Ghoochannejhad (free agent)
9	FW	NED	Mike van Duinen (to (Greece) OFI Crete)
11	MF	NED	Jesper Drost (to HHC Hardenberg)
14	FW	BEL	Manuel Benson (loan return to (Belgium) Antwerp)
16	GK	NED	Nigel Bertrams (to Eindhoven)
25	MF	NED	Immanuel Pherai (loan return to (Germany) Borussia Dortmund)
29	FW	NED	Thomas Buitink (loan return to Vitesse)
36	DF	FRA	Marc Olivier Doue (to (Belgium) Virton)
—	MF	NED	Clint Leemans (to (Denmark) Viborg, previously on loan at De Graafschap)

=== Willem II ===
In:

No.	Pos.	Nation	Player
4	DF	NOR	Ulrik Jenssen (from (Denmark) Nordsjælland)
5	DF	SWE	Emil Bergström (on loan from Utrecht)
10	FW	GRE	Argyris Kampetsis (on loan from (Greece) Panathinaikos)
15	FW	SWE	Max Svensson (from (Sweden) Helsingborg)
16	MF	NED	Ringo Meerveld (from Den Bosch)
20	MF	NED	Godfried Roemeratoe (on loan from Twente)
21	GK	GER	Timon Wellenreuther (on loan from (Belgium) Anderlecht)
25	DF	GRE	Nikos Michelis (on loan from (Italy) Milan)

Out:

No.	Pos.	Nation	Player
4	DF	NED	Jordens Peters (retired)
5	DF	NED	Ian Smeulers (loan return to Feyenoord)
6	DF	NED	Jan-Arie van der Heijden (free agent)
10	FW	GRE	Vangelis Pavlidis (to AZ)
15	FW	NED	Ole Romeny (loan return to NEC)
16	MF	NED	Rick Zuijderwijk (on loan to Den Bosch)
21	MF	BEL	Mike Trésor (to (Belgium) Genk)
22	DF	NED	Victor van den Bogert (to Den Bosch)
25	DF	SWE	Sebastian Holmén (to (Turkey) Çaykur Rizespor)
28	MF	ALB	Lindon Selahi (loan return to Twente)
32	DF	NED	Sven van Beek (loan return to Feyenoord)
49	GK	KOS	Arijanet Muric (loan return to (England) Manchester City)
—	DF	AUS	Dylan Ryan (to Den Bosch, previously on loan at (Australia) Melbourne Victory)

=== RKC Waalwijk ===
In:

No.	Pos.	Nation	Player
5	DF	BEL	Thierry Lutonda (from (Belgium) Anderlecht, previously on loan)
7	FW	DEN	Jens Odgaard (on loan from (Italy) Sassuolo, previously on loan at (Italy) Pescara)
11	MF	MAR	Iliass Bel Hassani (from (United Arab Emirates) Ajman Club)
13	GK	BEL	Jens Teunckens (from (Cyprus) AEK Larnaca)
14	MF	NED	Achraf El Bouchataoui (on loan from Feyenoord)
21	GK	POR	Joel Pereira (from (England) Manchester United, previously on loan at (England) Huddersfield Town)
24	DF	BEL	Dario Van den Buijs (from (Belgium) Beerschot, previously on loan at Fortuna Sittard)
28	DF	NED	Alexander Büttner (free agent)
29	FW	NED	Michiel Kramer (from ADO Den Haag)
31	GK	MAR	Issam El Maach (free agent)

Out:

No.	Pos.	Nation	Player
5	DF	CZE	Paul Quasten (to Ajax Amateurs)
7	FW	BEL	Cyril Ngonge (to Groningen)
8	MF	MAR	Anas Tahiri (to (Romania) CFR Cluj)
11	MF	NED	Ola John (to (Saudi Arabia) Al-Hazem)
17	FW	NED	Morad El Haddouti (free agent)
19	FW	NED	Sylla Sow (to (England) Sheffield Wednesday)
22	GK	NED	Mike Grim (to Oostzaan)
25	MF	NED	Thijs Oosting (loan return to AZ)
30	MF	GRE	James Efmorfidis (retired)
31	GK	GRE	Kostas Lamprou (to PEC Zwolle)
99	FW	MDA	Vitalie Damașcan (loan return to (Italy) Torino)
—	MF	BEL	Nando Nöstlinger (to (Belgium) Royal Cappellen, previously on loan at (Belgium) Lokeren-Temse)

=== Cambuur ===
In:

No.	Pos.	Nation	Player
9	FW	NED	Tom Boere (from (Germany) SV Meppen)
15	DF	NED	Marco Tol (from Volendam)
19	FW	NED	Sam Hendriks (from Go Ahead Eagles)
21	FW	HUN	Tamás Kiss (on loan from (Hungary) Puskás Akadémia)
23	DF	NED	Maxim Gullit (from AZ)
28	FW	LAT	Roberts Uldriķis (from (Switzerland) Sion)
30	MF	BUL	Filip Krastev (on loan from (Belgium) Lommel, previously on loan at (France) Troyes)

Out:

No.	Pos.	Nation	Player
9	FW	NED	Maarten Pouwels (to Almere City)
11	FW	NED	Giovanni Korte (to De Graafschap)
15	DF	NED	Joris Kramer (loan return to AZ)
18	MF	NED	Stanley Akoy (free agent)
19	DF	NED	Sven Nieuwpoort (to Excelsior)
21	FW	NED	Robert Mühren (loan return to (Belgium) Zulte Waregem)
22	FW	NED	Delano Ladan (free agent)
26	FW	NED	Ragnar Oratmangoen (to Go Ahead Eagles)
27	FW	CUW	Jarchinio Antonia (to NAC Breda)

=== Go Ahead Eagles ===
In:

No.	Pos.	Nation	Player
1	GK	SUR	Warner Hahn (from (Belgium) Anderlecht)
3	DF	GER	Gerrit Nauber (from (Germany) SV Sandhausen)
4	DF	NED	Joris Kramer (on loan from AZ, previously on loan at Cambuur)
9	FW	SWE	Isac Lidberg (from (Sweden) Gefle)
10	MF	BEL	Philippe Rommens (from TOP Oss)
11	FW	NED	Ragnar Oratmangoen (from Cambuur)
19	MF	GER	Ogechika Heil (on loan from (Germany) Hamburger SV)
20	DF	NED	Mats Deijl (from Den Bosch)
21	FW	ESP	Iñigo Córdoba (on loan from (Spain) Athletic Bilbao, previously on loan at (Spain) Alavés)
24	MF	COM	Yacine Bourhane (from (France) Chamois Niortais)
29	FW	ESP	Marc Cardona (on loan from (Spain) Osasuna, previously on loan at (Spain) Mallorca)
31	GK	NED	Job Schuurman (from NEC)

Out:

No.	Pos.	Nation	Player
1	GK	NED	Mitchel Michaelis (to Koninklijke HFC)
2	DF	NED	Wout Droste (to (Iceland) Akranes)
3	DF	NED	Sam Beukema (to AZ)
4	DF	NED	Jeroen Veldmate (to Emmen)
9	FW	FRA	Antoine Rabillard (to (France) Concarneau)
15	DF	GER	Nicolas Abdat (to TOP Oss)
16	GK	NED	Alessio Budel (to NEC Amateurs)
19	FW	NED	Sam Hendriks (to Cambuur)
20	GK	NED	Jay Gorter (to Ajax)
21	FW	NED	Bradly van Hoeven (loan return to Sparta Rotterdam)
22	DF	NED	Julliani Eersteling (to Jong Utrecht)

=== NEC ===
In:

No.	Pos.	Nation	Player
2	DF	NED	Ilias Bronkhorst (from Telstar)
4	DF	ESP	Iván Márquez (from (Poland) Cracovia)
5	DF	BRA	Rodrigo Guth (on loan from (Italy) Atalanta, previously on loan at (Italy) Pescara)
9	FW	TUR	Ali Akman (on loan from (Germany) Eintracht Frankfurt)
11	MF	DEN	Magnus Mattsson (from (Denmark) Silkeborg)
14	MF	DEN	Mikkel Duelund (on loan from (Ukraine) Dynamo Kyiv)
19	FW	ESP	Pedro Ruiz (on loan from (France) Marseille)
20	MF	DEN	Lasse Schöne (from Heerenveen)
24	DF	NED	Calvin Verdonk (on loan from (Portugal) Famalicão)
27	GK	AUS	Danny Vukovic (free agent)

Out:

No.	Pos.	Nation	Player
9	FW	BEL	Thibo Baeten (on loan to (Italy) Torino Primavera)
11	FW	MAR	Ayman Sellouf (to Jong Utrecht)
22	GK	NED	Norbert Alblas (from TOP Oss)
23	MF	NED	Anton Fase (free agent)
31	GK	NED	Job Schuurman (to Go Ahead Eagles)
32	FW	CUW	Rangelo Janga (loan return to (Kazakhstan) Astana)
34	DF	NED	Terry Lartey Sanniez (to (Slovenia) Celje)
70	DF	ANG	Kevin Bukusu (on loan to Helmond Sport)
77	FW	GUY	Terell Ondaan (loan return to (France) Grenoble)
—	FW	SLO	Etien Velikonja (to (Slovenia) Gorica, previously on loan)

== See also ==
- 2021–22 Eredivisie
