= Martin Angha =

Swiss footballer (born 1994)

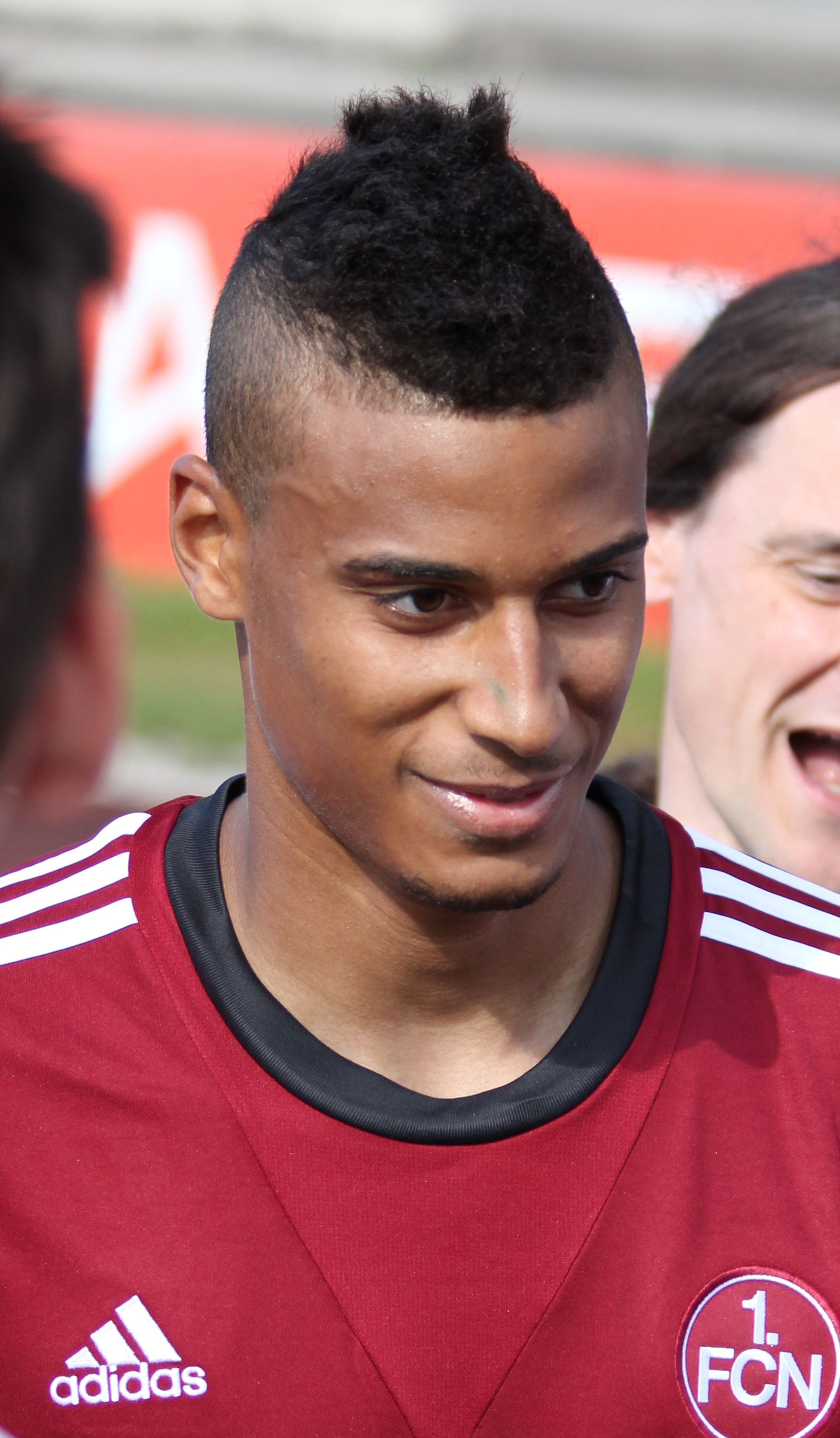
- Angha with 1. FC Nürnberg

Personal information
- Full name: Martin Yves Angha-Lötscher
- Date of birth: 22 January 1994 (age 32)
- Place of birth: Zürich, Switzerland
- Height: 1.88 m (6 ft 2 in)
- Position: Centre-back

Team information
- Current team: Uthai Thani
- Number: 2

Youth career
- –2003: Grasshoppers
- 2003–2010: Zürich
- 2010–2013: Arsenal

Senior career*
Years	Team	Apps	(Gls)
2012–2013	Arsenal	0	(0)
2013	1. FC Nürnberg II	8	(0)
2013–2014	1. FC Nürnberg	14	(0)
2014–2015	1860 Munich	16	(0)
2015	1860 Munich II	1	(0)
2015–2017	St. Gallen	44	(1)
2017–2019	Sion	18	(0)
2017	Sion II	1	(0)
2019–2022	Fortuna Sittard	79	(1)
2022	Al-Adalah	9	(0)
2023–2024	SV Wehen Wiesbaden	24	(0)
2024–2025	Oțelul Galați	13	(0)
2025–	Uthai Thani	21	(3)

International career
2009	Switzerland U15	2	(0)
2009–2010	Switzerland U16	7	(3)
2010–2011	Switzerland U17	11	(0)
2011–2012	Switzerland U18	7	(0)
2012–2013	Switzerland U19	6	(0)
2013–2015	Switzerland U20	10	(0)
2014–2016	Switzerland U21	13	(1)
- * Club domestic league appearances and goals as of 10 May 2026

Martin Yves Angha-Lötscher (born 22 January 1994) is a Swiss professional footballer who plays as a centre-back for Thai League 1 club Uthai Thani.

== Career ==
=== Arsenal ===
He was with Arsenal as a youth player in their academy and reserves. Before Arsenal Angha played for FC Zürich and Grasshopper Club Zürich. Angha did admit that before signing for Arsenal there was interest from Chelsea, Manchester United, and German club Bayern Munich. After the 2011–12 season Angha made the most appearances for the Arsenal Reserves team, with 22 matches while with the Reserves. On 26 September 2012, Angha made his Arsenal first-team debut against Coventry City in the League Cup. On 4 December 2012, Angha made an appearance against Olympiacos in the Champions League, coming on as a substitute in the 83rd minute.

=== 1. FC Nürnberg ===
On 10 April 2013, Angha agreed a summer move to German Bundesliga club 1. FC Nuremberg on a free transfer, signing a four-year deal.

=== 1860 Munich ===
On 30 August 2014, Angha signed a three-year contract with German 2. Bundesliga club 1860 Munich. He made his debut on 14 September 2014 in a 1–2 away win against St. Pauli, playing the entire match as a right back.

=== St. Gallen ===
Angha signed for Swiss Super League club St. Gallen in July 2015 for a reported fee of £150,000. He was club captain during his time with the club.

=== Sion ===
On 11 September 2017, Angha signed for FC Sion on a free transfer.

=== Fortuna Sittard ===
On 26 August 2019, Fortuna announced the transfer of Angha from FC Sion for an unknown fee. He signed a two-year contract with a third-year option for the club.

=== Al-Adalah ===
On 20 June 2022, Angha joined newly promoted Saudi Pro League club Al-Adalah. On 16 January 2023, Angha was released from his contract.

=== Wehen Wiesbaden ===
On 23 June 2023, Angha signed with German 2. Bundesliga club SV Wehen Wiesbaden. He left Wehen Wiesbaden by mutual consent on 24 August 2024.

== Personal life ==
Angha's mother is Swiss and his father is Congolese.

== Career statistics ==
As of matches played on 25 April 2025

Appearances and goals by club, season and competition
Club	Season	League			Cup		Continental		Other		Total	
Club	Season	Division	Apps	Goals	Apps	Goals	Apps	Goals	Apps	Goals	Apps	Goals
Arsenal	2012–13	Premier League	0	0	0	0	1 (Note: Appearance in UEFA Champions League)	0	1 (Note: Appearance in EFL Cup)	0	2	0
1. FC Nürnberg II	2013–14	Regionalliga Bayern	8	0	—		—		—		8	0
1. FC Nürnberg	2013–14	Bundesliga	14	0	0	0	—		—		14	0
1. FC Nürnberg	2014–15	2. Bundesliga	0	0	1	0	—		—		1	0
1. FC Nürnberg	Total		14	0	1	0	—		—		15	0
1860 Munich	2014–15	2. Bundesliga	16	0	1	0	—		0	0	17	0
1860 Munich II	2014–15	Regionalliga Bayern	1	0	—		—		—		1	0
St. Gallen	2015–16	Swiss Super League	29	1	3	0	—		—		32	1
St. Gallen	2016–17	Swiss Super League	15	0	0	0	—		—		15	0
St. Gallen	Total		44	1	3	0	—		—		47	1
Sion	2017–18	Swiss Super League	14	0	0	0	—		—		14	0
Sion	2018–19	Swiss Super League	4	0	0	0	—		—		4	0
Sion	Total		18	0	0	0	—		—		18	0
Sion II	2017–18	Promotion League	1	0	—		—		—		1	0
Fortuna Sittard	2019–20	Eredivisie	16	1	2	0	—		—		18	1
Fortuna Sittard	2020–21	Eredivisie	32	0	2	0	—		—		34	0
Fortuna Sittard	2021–22	Eredivisie	31	0	2	0	—		—		33	0
Fortuna Sittard	Total		79	1	6	0	—		—		85	1
Al-Adalah	2022–23	Saudi Pro League	9	0	0	0	—		—		9	0
SV Wehen Wiesbaden	2023–24	2. Bundesliga	24	0	1	0	—		2 (Note: Appearances in 2. Bundesliga relegation play-offs)	0	27	0
Oțelul Galați	2024–25	Liga I	13	0	2	0	—		—		15	0
Uthai Thani	2025–26	Thai League 1	0	0	0	0	—		—		0	0
Career total			227	2	14	0	1	0	3	0	245	2
