= Željko Sopić =

Croatian footballer and manager (born 1974)

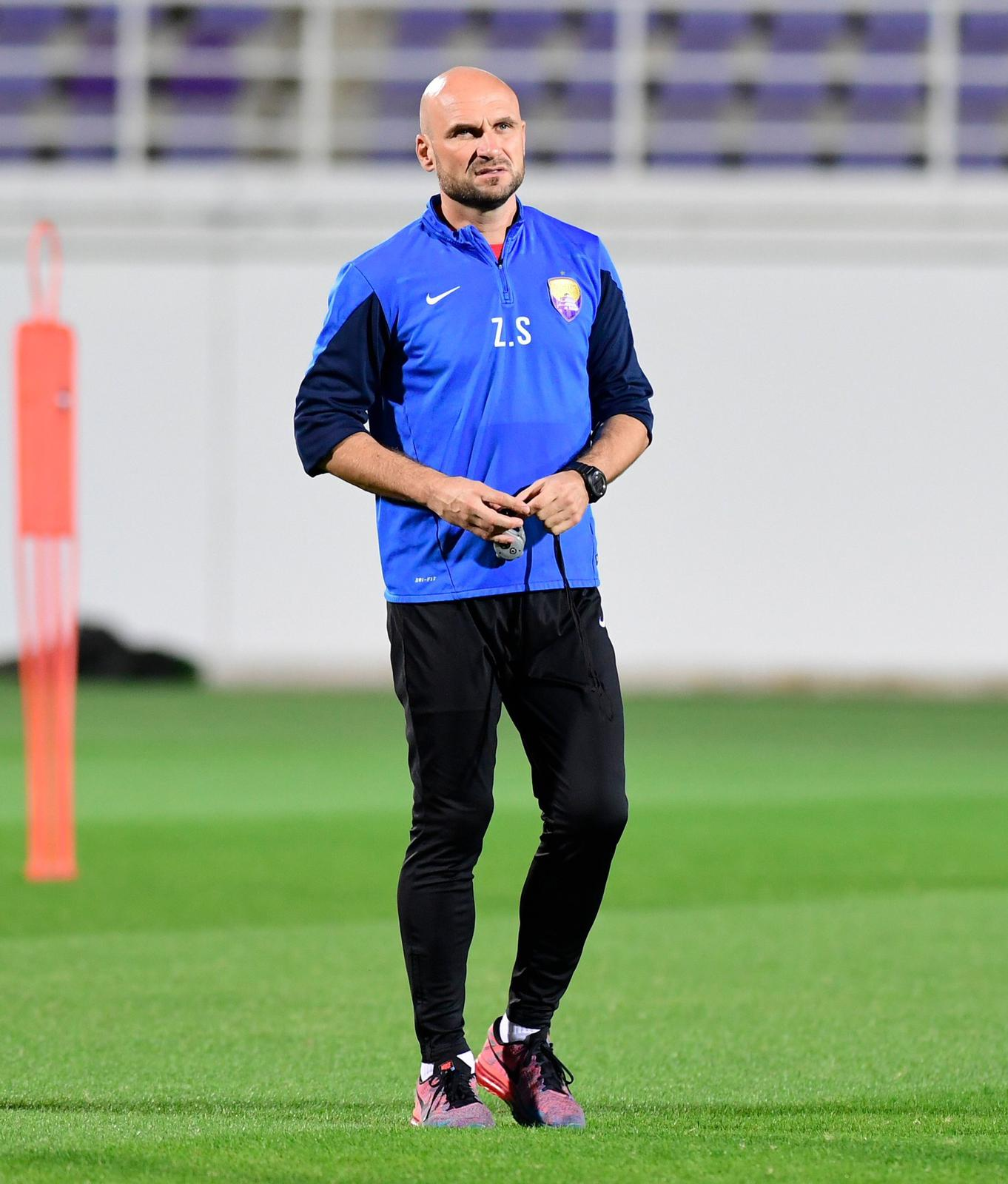
- Sopić with Al-Ain in 2019

Personal information
- Date of birth: 26 July 1974 (age 52)
- Place of birth: Zagreb, Republic of Croatia
- Height: 1.88 m (6 ft 2 in)
- Position: Midfielder

Team information
- Current team: Kauno Žalgiris (manager)

Senior career*
Years	Team	Apps	(Gls)
1994–1998	NK Zagreb	94	(3)
1998–2000	Borussia Mönchengladbach	52	(3)
2000–2005	LR Ahlen	126	(20)
2005–2006	NK Zagreb	20	(0)
2006–2008	Slaven Belupo	62	(2)
2008–2011	Lokomotiva	87	(9)
Total		441	(37)

International career
1998–1999	Croatia B	2	(0)

Managerial career
- 2012–2015: Rudeš
- 2015–2016: Dinamo Zagreb II
- 2016: Dinamo Zagreb (caretaker)
- 2017–2019: Al-Ain B
- 2019: Al-Ain (caretaker)
- 2019–2020: Sabah
- 2022–2023: Gorica
- 2023–2024: Rijeka
- 2025: Widzew Łódź
- 2025–2026: Osijek
- 2026–: Kauno Žalgiris
- * Club domestic league appearances and goals

Željko Sopić (born 26 July 1974) is a Croatian professional football manager and former player who is the manager of Toplyga club Kauno Žalgiris.

== Club career ==
Sopić started his professional career with NK Zagreb in 1994 and spent four years with the club's first team before leaving for Bundesliga side Borussia Mönchengladbach in 1998. He made 23 appearances and scored two goals in his only season in the German top flight. He went on to spend another season with Mönchengladbach in the 2. Bundesliga, following their relegation from the first division in 1999, before moving to league rivals LR Ahlen in the summer of 2000. He played for Ahlen until 2005, bringing his record in the 2. Bundesliga to a total of 155 appearances and 21 goals. He then returned to NK Zagreb for the 2005–06 season, before joining NK Slaven Belupo in the summer of 2006. In 2008, he returned to Zagreb but has played for NK Lokomotiva Zagreb in the Croatian First Football League.

== International career ==
He also won two international caps for the Croatian B national team, against Romania in 1998 and France in 1999.

== Managerial career ==
Sopić started as a manager with NK Rudeš in 2012. He managed a club to 2015, and in 2016 he was named the caretaker manager for Dinamo Zagreb, after Zoran Mamić had left. Before that, Sopić worked as the manager for Dinamo Zagreb II in the Croatian Second Football League, and after that as the assistant manager for Ivaylo Petev in Dinamo Zagreb. On 30 January 2017, Sopić became the assistant for Zoran Mamić in Al-Ain, but two years later, on 30 January 2019, Mamić left Al-Ain, and Sopić became the manager of the club.

On 26 November 2019, Sabah announced the appointment of Sopić on an 18-month contract. He was named manager of Gorica in November 2022, replacing Igor Angelovski.

On 17 March 2025, Sopić was announced as the new manager of the Polish Ekstraklasa team Widzew Łódź on a deal until June 2027. On 25 August 2025, he was relieved of his duties as head coach. During his tenure, Widzew secured five victories, two draws, and suffered eight defeats, with a goal difference of 18–17.

On 29 October 2025, Sopić was announced as the manager for Croatian Football League side Osijek.

On 28 June 2026, A Lyga champion Kauno Žalgiris announced Sopić as the new manager after the sacking of title-winning coach Eivinas Černiauskas. In his first european tie with the Lithuanian club, he guided them to the second round of the 2026–27 UEFA Champions League qualifying phase defeating Kosovar champions Drita 4–3 on aggregate.

== Personal life ==
Sopić is the father of the German-born footballer Leon Sopić.

== Managerial statistics ==
As of match played on 27 August 2026

Managerial record by team and tenure
Team	Nat	From	To	Record							
Team	Nat	From	To	G	W	D	L	GF	GA	GD	Win %
Dinamo Zagreb II	(Croatia)	22 September 2015	30 June 2016	25	8	8	9	24	27	−3	32.00
Dinamo Zagreb (caretaker)	(Croatia)	19 September 2016	29 September 2016	3	2	0	1	6	4	+2	66.67
Sabah FK	(Azerbaijan)	27 November 2019	3 July 2020	11	3	2	6	12	18	−6	27.27
Gorica	(Croatia)	28 November 2022	22 August 2023	24	7	9	8	27	28	−1	29.17
Rijeka	(Croatia)	23 August 2023	13 August 2024	44	26	10	8	79	34	+45	59.09
Widzew Łódź	(Poland)	17 March 2025	25 August 2025	15	5	2	8	18	17	+1	33.33
Osijek	(Croatia)	29 October 2025	26 February 2026	13	1	6	6	9	22	−13	7.69
Kauno Žalgiris	(Lithuania)	28 June 2026	Present	13	6	4	3	17	14	+3	46.15
Career total				145	56	40	49	184	161	+23	38.62

== Honours ==
=== Managerial ===
Kauno Žalgiris

- Toplyga: 2026
- Lithuanian Cup: 2026
