= Álex Carbonell =

Spanish footballer (born 1997)

Àlex Carbonell
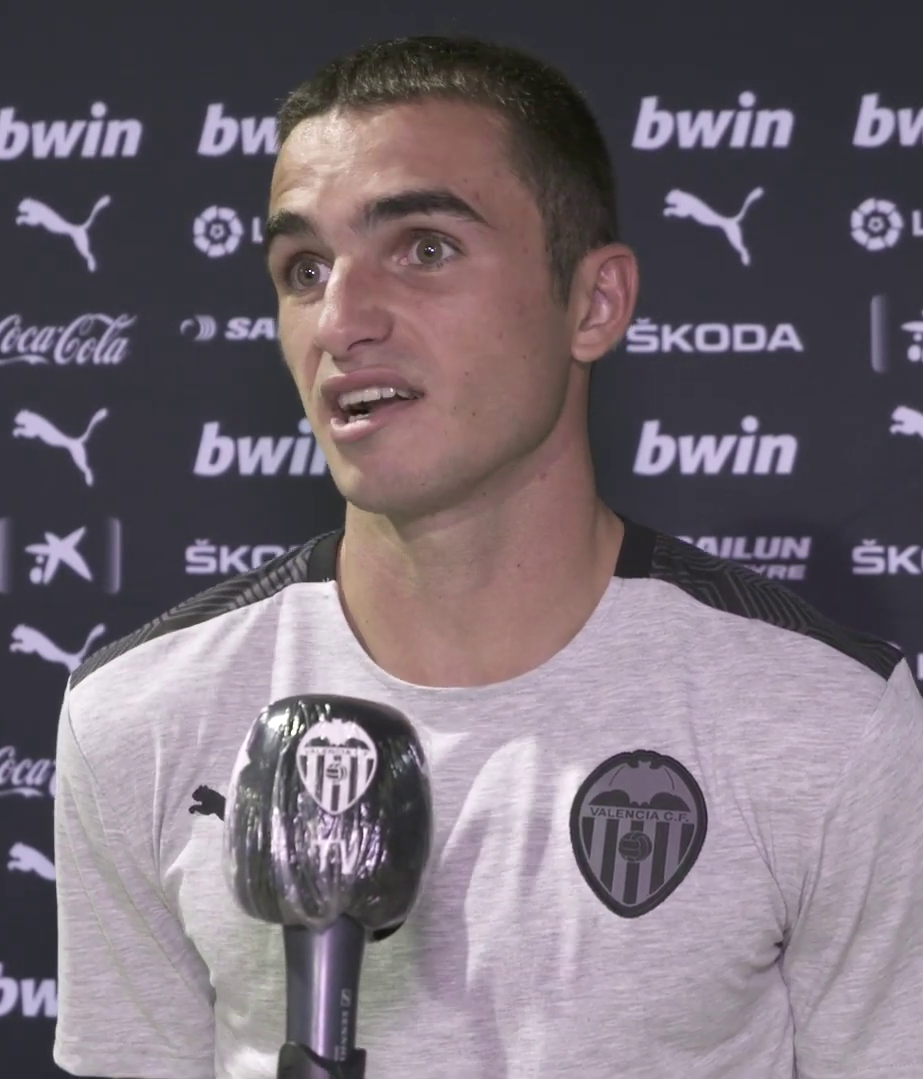

Personal information
- Full name: Àlex Carbonell Vallés
- Date of birth: 15 September 1997 (age 29)
- Place of birth: Sant Cugat, Spain
- Height: 1.82 m (6 ft 0 in)
- Position: Midfielder

Team information
- Current team: Penafiel
- Number: 6

Youth career
- 2003–2011: Barcelona
- 2011–2013: Cornellà
- 2013–2016: Barcelona

Senior career*
Years	Team	Apps	(Gls)
2015–2017	Barcelona B	24	(2)
2016	Barcelona	0	(0)
2017–2019	Reus	33	(2)
2019	Córdoba	9	(0)
2019–2020	Valencia	0	(0)
2019–2020	→ Fortuna Sittard (loan)	17	(0)
2020–2021	Luzern	9	(0)
2021–2022	Celta B	34	(0)
2022–2023	Barcelona B	37	(0)
2023–2024	Amorebieta	31	(0)
2024–2025	Almere City	11	(0)
2025–2026	Lugo	15	(0)
2026–	Penafiel	10	(0)

International career
2013	Spain U16	1	(0)
2013–2014	Spain U17	9	(0)
- * Club domestic league appearances and goals as of 20 June 2026

Àlex Carbonell Vallés (born 15 September 1997) is a Spanish professional footballer who plays as a central midfielder for Liga Portugal 2 club Penafiel.

== Club career ==
Born in Sant Cugat del Vallès, Barcelona, Catalonia, Carbonell initially joined FC Barcelona's La Masia in 2003 at the age of six. He left the club in 2011 for Cornellà, but returned in 2013.

On 29 August 2015, while still a youth, Carbonell made his senior debut with the reserves by coming on as a late substitute in a 0–0 Segunda División B home draw against Pobla de Mafumet. On 21 November of the following year, shortly after being promoted to the B-side, he signed a new five-year deal with the club.

Carbonell made his first team debut on 30 November 2016, starting in a 1–1 away draw against Hércules, for the season's Copa del Rey. The following 27 July, he joined Segunda División side Reus Deportiu.

Carbonell left Reus in January 2019, after Reus was excluded from the LFP. On 31 January, he signed a short-term deal with fellow second division side Córdoba.

In March 2019, Carbonell agreed to a pre-contract with Valencia, being assigned to the B-team for the 2019–20 campaign. On 9 July, he moved abroad for the first time in his career after agreeing to a one-year loan deal with Eredivisie side Fortuna Sittard.

On 29 September 2020, Carbonell joined Swiss club Luzern, signing a two-year contract. On 13 July 2021, after being rarely used at Luzern, Carbonell signed for Celta de Vigo and was assigned to the B-team in Primera División RFEF. Roughly one year later, he returned to Barça and their reserve team also in the third tier, on a one-year deal.

On 13 July 2023, Carbonell agreed to a contract with Amorebieta, newly-promoted to division two.

On 26 June 2024, Carbonell signed a two-year contract with Almere City in the Netherlands, with an optional third year.

On 7 July 2025, he returned to Spain, joining Primera Federación club Lugo.

In January 2026, Carbonell moved to Portugal, signing a contract until June 2027 with Liga Portugal 2 club Penafiel.

== Career statistics ==
As of 11 December 2023

Appearances and goals by club, season and competition
Club	Season	League			National cup		Other		Total	
Club	Season	Division	Apps	Goals	Apps	Goals	Apps	Goals	Apps	Goals
Barcelona B	2015–16	Segunda División B	2	0	—		—		2	0
Barcelona B	2016–17	Segunda División B	22	2	—		1 (Note: Appearance in Segunda División B play-offs)	0	23	2
Barcelona B	Total		24	2	—		1	0	25	2
Barcelona	2016–17	La Liga	0	0	1	0	0	0	1	0
Reus	2017–18	Segunda División	19	0	0	0	1 (Note: Appearance in Copa Catalunya)	0	20	0
Reus	2018–19	Segunda División	13	1	2	0	1	0	16	1
Reus	Total		32	1	2	0	2	0	36	1
Córdoba	2018–19	Segunda División	9	0	0	0	—		9	0
Fortuna Sittard	2019–20	Eredivisie	17	0	2	0	—		19	0
Luzern	2020–21	Swiss Super League	9	0	0	0	—		9	0
Celta B	2021–22	Primera Federación	34	0	—		—		34	0
Barcelona B	2022–23	Primera Federación	37	0	—		1	0	38	0
Amorebieta	2023–24	Segunda División	17	0	1	0	—		18	0
Career total			179	3	6	0	4	0	189	3

== Honours ==
Barcelona

- Copa del Rey: 2016–17

Luzern

- Schweizer Pokal: 2020–21
