= Felix Passlack =

German association football player

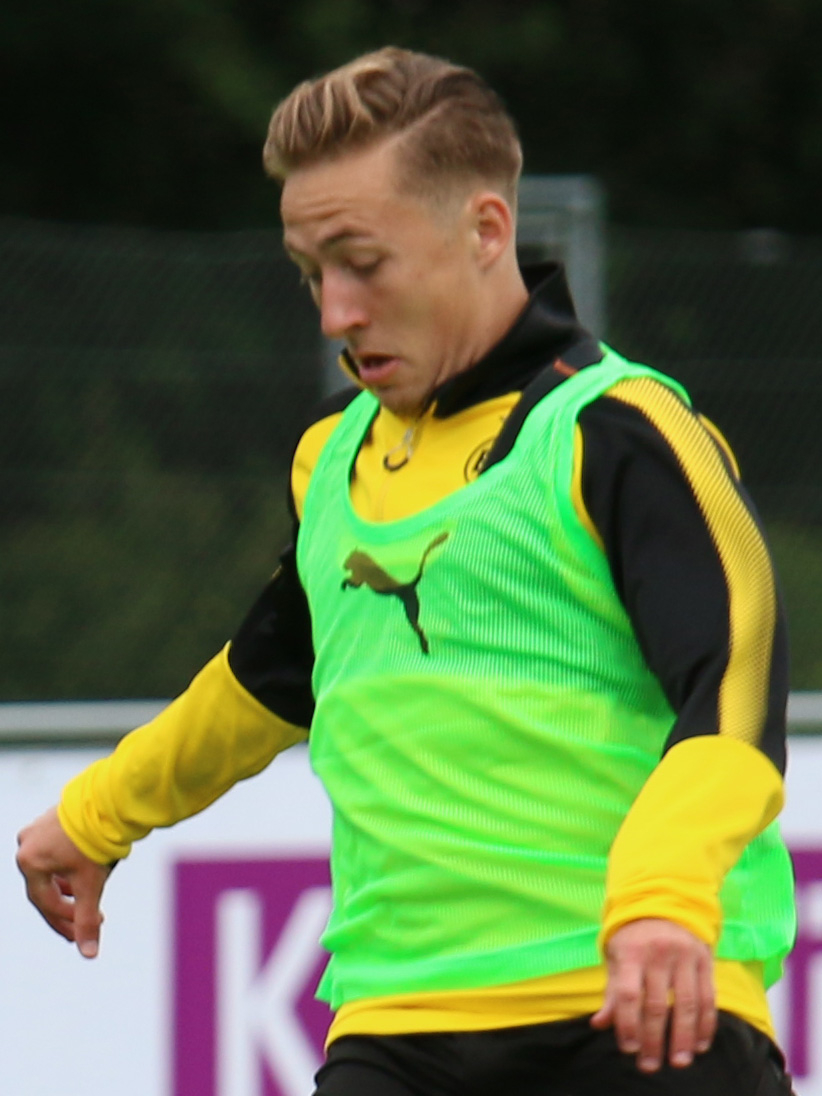
- Passlack training with Borussia Dortmund in 2017

Personal information
- Full name: Felix Passlack
- Date of birth: 29 May 1998 (age 28)
- Place of birth: Bottrop, Germany
- Height: 1.70 m (5 ft 7 in)
- Positions: Right-back; right wing-back

Team information
- Current team: Hibernian
- Number: 25

Youth career
- 2002–2010: SV Fortuna Bottrop
- 2010–2012: Rot-Weiß Oberhausen
- 2012–2016: Borussia Dortmund

Senior career*
Years	Team	Apps	(Gls)
2016–2023	Borussia Dortmund	34	(2)
2017–2018	→ TSG Hoffenheim (loan)	2	(0)
2017–2018	→ TSG Hoffenheim II (loan)	12	(2)
2018–2019	→ Norwich City (loan)	1	(0)
2019–2020	→ Fortuna Sittard (loan)	25	(2)
2023–2026	VfL Bochum	62	(3)
2026–	Hibernian	13	(2)

International career^{‡}
2014	Germany U16	6	(0)
2014–2015	Germany U17	20	(7)
2016	Germany U18	2	(0)
2016	Germany U19	3	(0)
2017–2020	Germany U21	4	(0)
Medal record
Representing Germany
UEFA European Under-17 Championship
Runner-up	Bulgaria 2015
- * Club domestic league appearances and goals as of 20 May 2026 ‡ National team caps and goals as of 12 November 2020

Felix Passlack (born 29 May 1998) is a German professional footballer who plays as a right-back or right wing-back for Scottish Premiership club Hibernian, which he captains.

== Club career ==
=== Borussia Dortmund ===
On 2 March 2016, Passlack made his professional debut in the Bundesliga in a 2–0 win against Darmstadt 98. He also played in a 3–1 win against FC Augsburg and a 3–0 win during the 2015–16 season.

==== Loan to TSG Hoffenheim ====
On 30 August 2017, Passlack extended his contract with Borussia Dortmund and was loaned out to TSG Hoffenheim for two years. The loan spell at TSG Hoffenheim was terminated early in July 2018.

==== Loan to Norwich City ====
On 2 July 2018, Passlack signed for Championship side Norwich City on a season-long loan. He only made one league appearance as Norwich were promoted to the Premier League as winners of the 2018–19 EFL Championship.

==== Loan to Fortuna Sittard ====
On 2 July 2019, Passlack signed for Eredivisie side Fortuna Sittard on a season-long loan.

=== VfL Bochum ===
On 20 April 2023, Passlack joined Bundesliga club VfL Bochum on a free transfer.

=== Hibernian ===
Passlack moved to Scottish Premiership club Hibernian on 2 February 2026, signing a three-year contract.

== International career ==
In 2014, Passlack made six appearances for Germany at under-16 level and in the same year he debuted for the Germany U17 team. In May 2015, Passlack was selected to captain the Germany squad at the 2015 UEFA European Under-17 Championship in Bulgaria, he played every single minute of the tournament, scoring three goals and helping Germany reach the final where they lost 4–1 to France. In October 2015, Passlack captained Germany at the 2015 FIFA U-17 World Cup in Chile, appearing in all four of Germany's matches and scoring two goals as Germany were eliminated in the round of 16 in a 2–0 loss to Croatia. In total, Passlack has scored seven goals in 20 appearances for the Germany U17 team. In March 2016, Passlack was called up to the Germany U18 team for the first time and later that year, received his first call to the Germany U19 team.

== Career statistics ==
As of match played 28 February 2026.

Club	Season	League			National cup (Note: Includes DFB-Pokal, FA Cup, KNVB Cup)		League cup (Note: Includes EFL Cup)		Europe		Other		Total	
Club	Season	Division	Apps	Goals	Apps	Goals	Apps	Goals	Apps	Goals	Apps	Goals	Apps	Goals
Borussia Dortmund	2015–16	Bundesliga	3	0	0	0	—		0	0	—		3	0
Borussia Dortmund	2016–17	Bundesliga	10	0	2	0	—		2	1	1 (Note: Appearance in DFL-Supercup)	0	15	1
Borussia Dortmund	2017–18	Bundesliga	1	0	1	0	—		0	0	1	0	3	0
Borussia Dortmund	2020–21	Bundesliga	7	1	1	0	—		5	0	1	0	14	1
Borussia Dortmund	2021–22	Bundesliga	10	1	2	0	—		2	0	1	0	15	1
Borussia Dortmund	2022–23	Bundesliga	3	0	1	0	—		1	0	—		5	0
Borussia Dortmund	Total		34	2	7	0	—		10	1	4	0	55	3
TSG Hoffenheim II (loan)	2017–18	Regionalliga Südwest	12	2	—		—		—		—		12	2
TSG Hoffenheim (loan)	2017–18	Bundesliga	2	0	0	0	—		2	0	—		4	0
Norwich City (loan)	2018–19	Championship	1	0	1	0	4	0	—		—		6	0
Fortuna Sittard (loan)	2019–20	Eredivisie	25	2	3	1	—		—		—		28	3
Borussia Dortmund II	2020–21	Regionalliga West	2	1	—		—		—		—		2	1
Borussia Dortmund II	2021–22	3. Liga	1	0	—		—		—		—		1	0
Borussia Dortmund II	Total		3	1	—		—		—		—		3	1
VfL Bochum	2023–24	Bundesliga	15	2	1	0	—		—		2 (Note: Appearances in Relegation Play-offs)	0	18	2
VfL Bochum	2024–25	Bundesliga	31	1	1	0	—		—		—		32	1
VfL Bochum	2025–26	2. Bundesliga	16	0	3	0	—		—		—		19	0
VfL Bochum	Total		62	3	5	0	—		—		2	0	70	3
Hibernian	2025–26	Scottish Premiership	5	1	—		—		—		—		5	1
Career total			144	11	16	1	4	0	12	1	6	0	182	13

== Honours ==
Borussia Dortmund

- DFB-Pokal: 2016–17

Germany U17

- UEFA European Under-17 Championship runner-up: 2015

Individual

- Fritz Walter Medal U17 Gold: 2015
- 2015 UEFA European Under-17 Championship Team of the Tournament
