= Leon Sopić =

German footballer

Personal information
- Date of birth: 28 October 2000 (age 26)
- Place of birth: Ahlen, Germany
- Height: 1.93 m (6 ft 4 in)
- Position: Defender

Youth career
- 2015–2018: Rudeš

Senior career*
Years	Team	Apps	(Gls)
2018–2019	Rudeš	2	(0)
2019–2020	Emmen	1	(0)
2020–2023	Dinamo Zagreb II	6	(0)
2021–?	→ Trnje (loan)	0	(0)
2022	→ Cibalia (loan)	11	(0)
- * Club domestic league appearances and goals as of 01:55, 4 July 2024 (UTC)

Leon Sopić (born 29 October 2000) is a German professional footballer who plays as a defender.

== Club career ==
Sopić made his professional debut with Rudeš in a 1–1 Croatian First Football League tie with NK Istra 1961 on 18 May 2018. On 5 July 2019, Sopić transferred to Emmen in the Netherlands. As of 1 October 2020, Sopić had signed for the second team of Dinamo Zagreb.

== Personal life ==
Sopić is the son of the Croatian former footballer Željko Sopić.
