= Job van de Walle =

Dutch footballer

Personal information
- Date of birth: 26 May 1997 (age 29)
- Place of birth: Heerlen, Netherlands
- Position: Goalkeeper

Team information
- Current team: RKVV Sportclub '25

Youth career
- SVN
- Wijnandia
- Fortuna Sittard

Senior career*
| Years | Team | Apps | (Gls) |
| 2016–2020 | Fortuna Sittard | 1 | (0) |
| 2018–2020 | → Groene Ster (loan) | | |
| 2020– | RKVV Sportclub '25 | | |
- * Club domestic league appearances and goals as of 09:40, 18 January 2019 (UTC)

Job van de Walle (born 26 May 1997) is a Dutch professional footballer who plays for as a goalkeeper for RKVV Sportclub '25.

== Career ==
Born in Heerlen, Van de Walle has played for Fortuna Sittard and Groene Ster.
