= Áron Dobos =

Hungarian footballer

Personal information
- Date of birth: 8 June 2000 (age 26)
- Place of birth: Dunaújváros, Hungary
- Height: 1.71 m (5 ft 7 in)
- Position: Forward

Team information
- Current team: Soroksár
- Number: 8

Youth career
- 2004–2008: Baracs SE
- 2008–2011: DVSI
- 2011: → Vidi (loan)
- 2011–2014: MTK
- 2014–2016: Dunaújváros

Senior career*
Years	Team	Apps	(Gls)
2016–2018	Dunaújváros	48	(25)
2018–2020	Fortuna Sittard	2	(0)
2020	→ Győri ETO (loan)	0	(0)
2020–2023	Szeged-Csanád	73	(3)
2023–	Soroksár	40	(2)

International career
2016	Hungary U17	2	(2)
- * Club domestic league appearances and goals as of 10 June 2025

Áron Dobos (born 8 June 2000) is a Hungarian professional footballer. He plays as a forward for Soroksár.

== Club career ==
Dobos began his senior footballing career with his local club Dunaújváros in the Hungarian Nemzeti Bajnokság III. After scoring 25 goals in 48 games, Dobos transferred to Fortuna Sittard in the Netherlands on 4 July 2018. Dobos made his professional debut with Fortuna Sittard in a 5–1 Eredivisie loss to De Graafschap on 20 January 2019.

On 7 March 2023, Dobos signed with Soroksár as a free agent.

== International career ==
Dobos is a youth international for Hungary. He represented the Hungary U17s in a two friendlies against the Wales U17s in 2016, scoring twice.

== Personal life ==
Dobos' father, Barna Dobos, is a Hungarian football manager.
