= Lazar Kojić =

Serbian footballer (born 1999)

Personal information
- Date of birth: 11 December 1999 (age 26)
- Place of birth: Belgrade, Serbia and Montenegro
- Height: 1.86 m (6 ft 1 in)
- Position: Midfielder

Team information
- Current team: Panetolikos
- Number: 28

Youth career
- Brodarac

Senior career*
Years	Team	Apps	(Gls)
2018–2020	Fortuna Sittard	8	(0)
2018–2019	→ Bačka Palanka (loan)	6	(0)
2019–2020	→ Radnik Surdulica (loan)	14	(0)
2020–2022	Proleter Novi Sad	60	(1)
2022–2023	Radnički Beograd	24	(0)
2023–2024	Voždovac	17	(0)
2024–2025	Hegelmann	30	(5)
2025–	Panetolikos	31	(0)

International career
2017–2018	Serbia U19	6	(0)
- * Club domestic league appearances and goals as of 20 September 2026

Lazar Kojić (born 11 December 1999) is a Serbian professional footballer who plays as a midfielder for Greek Super League club Panetolikos.

== Club career ==
Born in Belgrade, Kojić began his career at FK Brodarac before signing for Dutch club Fortuna Sittard in January 2018. He had loan spells back in Serbia with OFK Bačka and Radnik Surdulica, before signing for Proleter Novi Sad in August 2020.

Kojić signed for Panetolikos in August 2025.

== International career ==
Kojić has also played for the Serbian under-19 team.
