= Clint Essers =

Dutch footballer (born 1997)

Personal information
- Date of birth: 21 January 1997 (age 29)
- Place of birth: Maastricht, Netherlands
- Height: 1.80 m (5 ft 11 in)
- Position: Right-back

Team information
- Current team: Eindhoven
- Number: 22

Youth career
- RKHSV
- –2007: RKSV Heer
- 2007–2016: Fortuna Sittard

Senior career*
Years	Team	Apps	(Gls)
2017–2021	Fortuna Sittard	68	(0)
2021–2023	MVV	35	(2)
2024–2025	SG Barockstadt	32	(0)
2025–	Eindhoven	34	(2)
- * Club domestic league appearances and goals as of 28 April 2026

Clint Essers (born 21 January 1997) is a Dutch professional footballer who plays as a right-back for Eerste Divisie club Eindhoven.

== Club career ==
=== Fortuna Sittard ===
Essers played youth football for RKHSV and RKSV Heer before joining the Fortuna Sittard youth academy in 2007. He made his Eerste Divisie debut for Fortuna on 7 April 2017 in a 4–1 home win over Helmond Sport, replacing Jorrit Smeets in the 83rd minute.

In the 2017–18 season, Essers became a starter for Fortuna who finished second in the league table and reached promotion to the Eredivisie.

=== MVV ===
On 31 August 2021, he moved to Eerste Divisie club MVV on a one-year contract with an option for the second year. He made his debut for the club on 5 September 2021, replacing Rico Zeegers in the 80th minute of a 3–0 league win over Telstar. On 14 January 2022, Essers scored his first professional goal in the 91st minute of a 2–1 away loss to Telstar in the Eerste Divisie. The following week, he tore the anterior cruciate ligament of his knee, sidelining him for an extended period of time.

=== SG Barockstadt ===
In January 2024, after being without a club for six months, he moved to German fourth-tier side SG Barockstadt Fulda-Lehnerz.

=== Eindhoven ===
On 22 July 2025, Essers signed a one-year contract with Eindhoven of the Eerste Divisie following a successful trial, returning to Dutch football.

== Career statistics ==
As of match played 23 May 2023

Appearances and goals by club, season and competition
Club	Season	League			National cup		Other		Total	
Club	Season	Division	Apps	Goals	Apps	Goals	Apps	Goals	Apps	Goals
Fortuna Sittard	2016–17	Eerste Divisie	1	0	0	0	—		1	0
Fortuna Sittard	2017–18	Eerste Divisie	30	0	2	0	—		32	0
Fortuna Sittard	2018–19	Eredivisie	15	0	3	0	—		18	0
Fortuna Sittard	2019–20	Eredivisie	18	0	3	0	—		21	0
Fortuna Sittard	2020–21	Eredivisie	4	0	0	0	—		4	0
Fortuna Sittard	Total		68	0	8	0	—		76	0
MVV	2021–22	Eerste Divisie	15	1	1	0	—		16	1
MVV	2022–23	Eerste Divisie	20	1	0	0	1 (Note: Appearances in Eredivisie promotion/relegation playoffs)	0	21	1
MVV	Total		35	2	1	0	1	0	37	2
SG Barockstadt	2023–24	Regionalliga Südwest	0	0	0	0	—		0	0
Career total			103	2	9	0	1	0	113	2
