= Nassim El Ablak =

Dutch footballer (born 2000)

Personal information
- Date of birth: 7 January 2000 (age 26)
- Place of birth: Harderwijk, Netherlands
- Height: 1.78 m (5 ft 10 in)
- Position: Midfielder

Team information
- Current team: DVS '33
- Number: 34

Youth career
- –2011: Zwart Wit '63
- 2011–2015: SC Heerenveen
- 2015–2017: PEC Zwolle
- 2017–2018: VVOG
- 2018–2019: Fortuna Sittard

Senior career*
Years	Team	Apps	(Gls)
2019–2021	Fortuna Sittard	6	(0)
2021–	DVS '33	32	(1)
- * Club domestic league appearances and goals as of 15:16, 5 January 2023 (UTC)

Nassim El Ablak (born 7 January 2000) is a Dutch footballer who plays as a midfielder for Derde Divisie club DVS '33.

== Club career ==
On 22 May 2019, El Ablak signed his first professional contract with Fortuna Sittard. El Ablak made his professional debut with Fortuna Sittard in a 1-1 Eredivisie tie with SC Heerenveen on 31 August 2019.

El Ablak joined Derde Divisie club DVS '33 on a free on 27 October 2021 after his contract had expired with Fortuna. On 25 May 2022, he extended his contract with DVS until 2023.

== Personal life ==
Born in the Netherlands, El Ablak is of Moroccan descent.
