= Bo Breukers =

Dutch professional footballer

Personal information
- Date of birth: 20 May 1999 (age 27)
- Place of birth: Munstergeleen, Netherlands
- Height: 1.78 m (5 ft 10 in)
- Position: Midfielder

Youth career
- –2006: SVM Munstergeleen
- 2006–2017: Fortuna Sittard

Senior career*
Years	Team	Apps	(Gls)
2017–2020	Fortuna Sittard	4	(0)
2019	→ Dordrecht (loan)	12	(0)
2020–2022	Groene Ster		
- * Club domestic league appearances and goals

Bo Breukers (born 20 May 1999) is a Dutch former professional footballer who played as a midfielder.
