= Amadou Ciss =

Senegalese footballer

Personal information
- Full name: Amadou Ciss
- Date of birth: 10 April 1999 (age 27)
- Place of birth: Guédiawaye, Senegal
- Height: 1.86 m (6 ft 1 in)
- Position: Midfielder

Team information
- Current team: Al-Arabi
- Number: 20

Youth career
- Pau

Senior career*
Years	Team	Apps	(Gls)
2017–2018	Pau	24	(2)
2017–2018	Pau II	3	(1)
2018–2020	Fortuna Sittard	32	(6)
2020–2024	Amiens	37	(3)
2021–2024	Amiens B	1	(0)
2022	→ Adanaspor (loan)	14	(6)
2022–2023	→ AEL Limassol (loan)	16	(0)
2024–2025	Adanaspor	42	(6)
2025–	Al-Arabi	3	(1)

International career
2018–2019	Senegal U20	8	(1)
- * Club domestic league appearances and goals as of 15:28, 23 October 2025 (UTC)

Amadou Ciss (born 10 April 1999) is a Senegalese professional footballer who plays for Saudi club Al-Arabi.

== Club career ==
On 8 February 2022, Ciss signed with Adanaspor in Turkey.

On 4 September 2025, Ciss joined Saudi First Division League club Al-Arabi.
