= Leandro Fernandes =

Dutch footballer (born 1999)

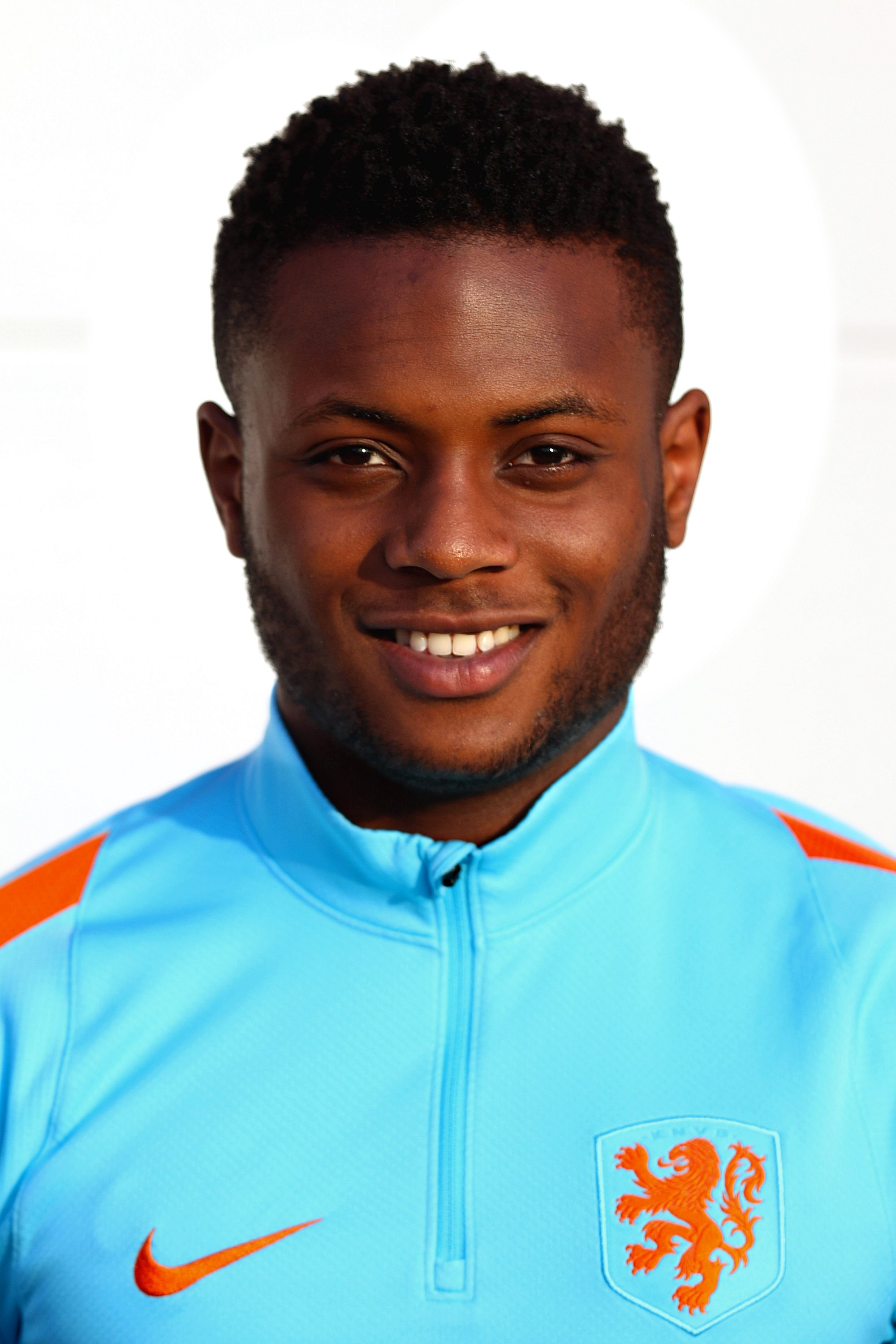
- Fernandes in 2017

Personal information
- Full name: Leandro Fernandes da Cunha
- Date of birth: 25 December 1999 (age 26)
- Place of birth: Nijmegen, Netherlands
- Height: 1.76 m (5 ft 9 in)
- Position: Midfielder

Team information
- Current team: Njarðvík
- Number: 8

Youth career
- 2006–2007: Quick 1888
- 2007–2013: NEC
- 2013–2018: PSV
- 2018–2019: Juventus

Senior career*
Years	Team	Apps	(Gls)
2016–2018	Jong PSV	1	(0)
2018–2020	Juventus	0	(0)
2018–2019	→ Juventus U23 (res.)	5	(0)
2019–2020	→ Fortuna Sittard (loan)	5	(0)
2020–2021	Pescara	11	(0)
2021–2022	PEC Zwolle	3	(0)
2022–2023	Jerv	32	(0)
2024	Žalgiris	10	(1)
2025–2026	Dubai City		
2026-	Njarðvík	20	(2)

International career
2013–2014	Netherlands U15	6	(1)
2014–2015	Netherlands U16	12	(1)
2015–2016	Netherlands U17	16	(0)
2016–2017	Netherlands U18	7	(0)
- * Club domestic league appearances and goals as of 14 October 2026

Leandro Fernandes da Cunha (born 25 December 1999), known as Leandro Fernandes, is a Dutch professional footballer who plays as a midfielder for Icelandic club Njarðvík.

== Club career ==
He made his professional debut in the Eerste Divisie for Jong PSV on 14 October 2016 in a game against Almere City.

On 31 January 2018, Fernandes joined Juventus. He made his first appearance for the club in a preseason match against Bayern Munich on 25 July 2018.

On 2 September 2019, Fernandes signed with Fortuna Sittard on a season long loan.

On 28 September 2020, he moved to Serie B club Pescara. On 12 April 2021, his contract with Pescara was terminated by mutual consent.

On 15 September 2021, he joined PEC Zwolle for the 2021–22 season.

On 8 February 2022, he signed a three-year contract with Norwegian side Jerv. On 23 November 2023, FK Jerv announced that the collaboration with Fernandes ended.

== Style of play ==
Fernandes is considered to be a midfielder with strong technical qualities and free kick taking abilities. He usually plays as an attacking midfielder.
