= Jacky Donkor =

Belgian footballer (born 1998)

Personal information
- Date of birth: 12 November 1998 (age 27)
- Place of birth: Ghent, Belgium
- Height: 1.76 m (5 ft 9 in)
- Position: Midfielder

Team information
- Current team: Wieczysta Kraków
- Number: 30

Youth career
- 2003–2011: Gent
- 2011–2015: Anderlecht
- 2015–2016: West Bromwich Albion
- 2016–2019: Lokeren

Senior career*
Years	Team	Apps	(Gls)
2019–2021	Fortuna Sittard	1	(0)
2020–2021	→ FC Eindhoven (loan)	26	(3)
2021–2022	Dordrecht	32	(6)
2022–2025	Excelsior	38	(5)
2025–	Wieczysta Kraków	11	(0)
2026–	Wieczysta Kraków II	7	(2)
- * Club domestic league appearances and goals as of 21:11, 31 May 2026 (UTC)

Jacky Donkor (born 12 November 1998) is a Belgian professional footballer who plays as a midfielder for Polish club Wieczysta Kraków.

== Club career ==
On 24 August 2021, Donkor joined Dordrecht.

On 21 July 2022, Donkor signed a three-year contract with Excelsior.

On 7 July 2025, Donkor moved to Polish second division club Wieczysta Kraków on a two-year deal.

== Personal life ==
Born in Belgium, Donkor is of Ghanaian descent.

== Honours ==
Wieczysta Kraków II

- IV liga Lesser Poland: 2025–26
