= Dimitrios Ioannidis (footballer) =

Greek footballer

Personal information
- Full name: Dimitrios Rafail Ioannidis
- Date of birth: 13 February 2000 (age 26)
- Place of birth: Essen, Germany
- Height: 1.80 m (5 ft 11 in)
- Position: Midfielder

Youth career
- 2014–2018: Rot-Weiß Oberhausen
- 2018–2019: Fortuna Sittard

Senior career*
Years	Team	Apps	(Gls)
2019–2021	Fortuna Sittard	3	(0)
2020–2021	→ Sportfreunde Lotte (loan)	31	(0)
2021–2022	Rot Weiss Ahlen	20	(1)

International career^{‡}
2018	Greece U19	1	(0)
- * Club domestic league appearances and goals as of 14 May 2022 ‡ National team caps and goals as of 26 September 2019

Dimitrios Ioannidis (Greek: Δημήτριος Ιωαννίδης; born 13 February 2000) is a Greek professional footballer who plays as a midfielder. Born in Germany, he has made one appearance for the Greece U19 national team.

== Club career ==
On 28 May 2019, Ioannidis signed his first professional contract with Fortuna Sittard. He made his professional debut with Fortuna Sittard in a 4–0 Eredivisie loss to AZ Alkmaar on 4 August 2019.

== International career ==
Born in Germany, Ioannidis is of Greek descent. He represents Greece as a youth international.
