= Grégoire Amiot =

French footballer (born 1995)

Personal information
- Date of birth: 10 May 1995 (age 31)
- Place of birth: Cholet, France
- Height: 1.87 m (6 ft 2 in)
- Position: Centre-back

Team information
- Current team: Le Puy
- Number: 3

Senior career*
Years	Team	Apps	(Gls)
2012–2015	Toulouse B	33	(1)
2015–2017	Reims B	33	(0)
2015–2017	Reims	12	(1)
2017–2019	Bourg-en-Bresse	46	(2)
2019–2021	Fortuna Sittard	10	(0)
2020	→ Falkenbergs FF (loan)	12	(0)
2021–2023	Le Puy	18	(2)
2023–	US Saint-Malo	6	(0)
- * Club domestic league appearances and goals as of 10:12, 4 November 2023 (UTC)

Grégoire Amiot (born 10 May 1995) is a French professional footballer who plays as a centre-back for Ligue 3 club US Saint-Malo.

== Honours ==
Le Puy

- Championnat National 2: 2021–22
