= Vitalie Damașcan =

Moldovan footballer

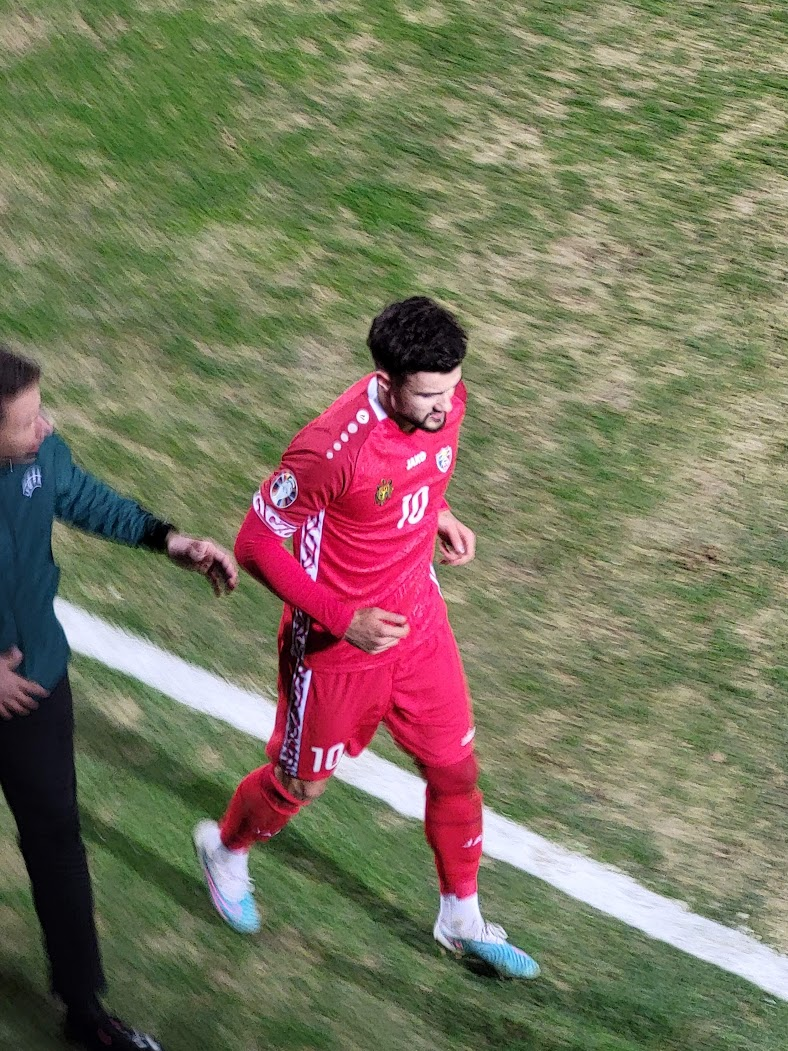
- Damașcan with Moldova in 2023

Personal information
- Date of birth: 24 January 1999 (age 27)
- Place of birth: Soroca, Moldova
- Height: 1.80 m (5 ft 11 in)
- Position: Forward

Team information
- Current team: Hapoel Jerusalem
- Number: 10

Senior career*
Years	Team	Apps	(Gls)
2015–2016	Zimbru-2 Chișinău	34	(23)
2015–2017	Zimbru Chișinău	16	(1)
2017	Sheriff-2 Tiraspol	3	(1)
2017–2018	Sheriff Tiraspol	23	(18)
2018–2021	Torino	1	(0)
2018	→ Sheriff Tiraspol (loan)	10	(4)
2019–2020	→ Fortuna Sittard (loan)	19	(6)
2020–2021	→ RKC Waalwijk (loan)	19	(2)
2021–2024	Sepsi OSK	36	(4)
2022–2023	→ Voluntari (loan)	28	(9)
2024	→ Stade Lausanne Ouchy (loan)	16	(2)
2024–2025	Maccabi Petah Tikva	25	(8)
2025–2026	Zrinjski Mostar	6	(1)
2026	Maccabi Bnei Reineh	12	(4)
2026–	Hapoel Jerusalem	7	(2)

International career^{‡}
2015	Moldova U17 (Note: Only official UEFA matches included)	3	(1)
2016	Moldova U19	3	(0)
2017–2020	Moldova U21	10	(3)
2018–	Moldova	46	(5)
- * Club domestic league appearances and goals as of 2 November 2026 ‡ National team caps and goals as of 16 November 2025

Vitalie Damașcan (born 24 January 1999) is a Moldovan professional footballer who plays as a forward for Israeli Premier League club Hapoel Jerusalem and the Moldova national team.

== Club career ==
Damașcan made his professional debut with Zimbru Chișinău on 29 November 2015 in a league match against Milsami Orhei.

In 2017, Damașcan moved to rivals Sheriff Tiraspol on a free transfer. He scored his first goal for Sheriff against his former club Zimbru Chișinău on 7 April. The match ended in a 1–0 victory for Sheriff. On 25 May, Damașcan scored a brace in the final of the 2016–17 Moldovan Cup against Zaria Bălți. Sheriff ended up lifting the trophy as they won the game 5–0.

On 16 July 2018, he was announced as a new signing by Italian club Torino.

== International career ==
On 27 January 2018, Damașcan made his international debut for Moldova. He played 77 minutes in a 1–0 friendly defeat to South Korea before being replaced.

On 13 June 2017, Damașcan scored his first two goals for Moldova's U21 team against San Marino in 2019 European U21 qualification.

== Personal life ==
Damașcan's elder brother, Ilie is also a professional footballer.

== Career statistics ==
As of match played 14 October 2025

Appearances and goals by national team and year
National team	Year	Apps	Goals
Moldova	2018	9	1
Moldova	2019	4	0
Moldova	2020	3	0
Moldova	2021	4	1
Moldova	2022	4	0
Moldova	2023	10	1
Moldova	2024	8	2
Moldova	2025	4	0
Total		46	5

Scores and results list Moldova's goal tally first.

#	Date	Venue	Opponent	Score	Result	Competition
1.	15 November 2018	Stadio Olimpico di Serravalle, Serravalle, San Marino	San Marino	1–0	1–0	2018–19 UEFA Nations League D
2.	6 June 2021	Zimbru Stadium, Chișinău, Moldova	Azerbaijan	1–0	1–0	Friendly
3.	7 September 2023	Raiffeisen Arena, Linz, Austria	Austria	1–0	1–1	Friendly
4.	22 March 2024	Mardan Sports Complex, Antalya, Turkey	North Macedonia	1–1	1–1	Friendly
5.	26 March 2024	Mardan Sports Complex, Antalya, Turkey	Cayman Islands	1–0	4–0	Friendly

== Honours ==
Sheriff Tiraspol

- Divizia Națională: 2016–17, 2017
- Cupa Moldovei: 2016–17

Sepsi OSK

- Cupa României: 2021–22
- Supercupa României: 2022, 2023

Individual

- Divizia Națională top scorer: 2017 (13 goals)
