= 2021–22 SC Telstar season =

SC Telstar
2021–22 season
- Stadium: Sportpark Schoonenberg
- Eerste Divisie: 19th
- KNVB Cup: R16
- Top goalscorer: League: Glynor Plet (13 goals); All: Glynor Plet (14 goals)
- Highest home attendance: 2,832 (8th week)
- Lowest home attendance: 0 (Note: Due to Covid-19 pandemic)(16th,18th, 20th, 22nd, 23rd weeks and KNVB 2nd round)
- Average home league attendance: 1,494
- Biggest win: 4-1 (Excelsior Rotterdam (a) 34th week)
- Biggest defeat: 5-1 (FC Volendam (h) 10th week)
- All statistics correct as of 3 May 2019.

The 2021–22 season was the 59th year of SC Telstar's existence since its foundation. During this campaign, the club made its 45th appearance in the Eerste Divisie, extending its uninterrupted stay in the second division of Dutch football to 44 seasons.

Alongside its league commitments, SC Telstar also took part in the KNVB Cup. The team advanced to the round of 16, where its cup journey came to an end following a 2–1 loss against PSV Eindhoven.

SC Telstar concluded the Eerste Divisie season in 19th position. Glynor Plet was the club's most prolific goalscorer, registering 15 goals in all competitions, with 14 coming in the league and one in the KNVB Cup.

Sven van Doorm recorded the highest number of appearances for Telstar throughout the campaign, playing 40 matches in total, consisting of 37 Eerste Divisie fixtures and three KNVB Cup matches.

== Players ==
=== First-team squad ===
As of 31 January 2022

Note: Flags indicate national team as defined under FIFA eligibility rules; some limited exceptions apply. Players may hold more than one non-FIFA nationality.

No.	Pos.	Nation	Player
1	GK	NED	Abdel El Ouazzane
2	DF	NED	Yaël Liesdek
3	DF	NED	Jip Molenaar
4	DF	NED	Özgür Aktaş
5	DF	SUR	Delvechio Blackson
6	MF	NED	Anwar Bensabouh
7	FW	NED	Rashaan Fernandes
8	MF	NED	Sven van Doorm
9	FW	NED	Glynor Plet
10	FW	NED	Gyliano van Velzen
11	FW	NED	Anthony Berenstein
14	MF	NED	Niels van Wetten
15	DF	NED	Tyrese Gemert
16	GK	NED	Ronald Koeman Jr.
17	GK	CUW	Trevor Doornbusch

No.	Pos.	Nation	Player
18	MF	NED	Tom Overtoom
19	MF	NED	Redouan Taha
21	DF	BEL	Siebe Vandermeulen
23	MF	NED	Cas Dijkstra
24	DF	NED	Yassine Zakir
25	DF	RUS	Roman Tugarinov
26	MF	AZE	Ozan Kökçü
27	MF	SUR	Roscello Vlijter
29	FW	NED	Rein Smit
30	MF	NED	Marouan El Ouardani
62	DF	NED	Jay Kruiver
65	MF	NED	Stanley Akoy
66	FW	NED	Randy Wolters
68	MF	BRA	Giovanni

== Transfers ==
=== In ===
Pos.	Player	Transferred from	Fee	Date
MF	(Netherlands) Anwar Bensabouh	(Netherlands) Almere City FC		1 July 2021
DF	(Suriname) Delvechio Blackson	(Netherlands) Almere City FC	Free	1 July 2021
DF	(Netherlands) Jip Molenaar	(Netherlands) Jong Volendam	Free	1 July 2021
FW	(Netherlands) Rein Smit	(Netherlands) SC Heerenveen	Free	1 July 2021
GK	(Netherlands) Ronald Koeman Jr.	(Netherlands) TOP Oss	Free	1 July 2021
DF	(Netherlands) Tyrese Gemert	(Netherlands) SC Heerenveen U21	Free	23 July 2021
FW	(Netherlands) Yassine Zakir	No club		1 August 2021
DF	(Turkey) Özgür Aktaş	(Netherlands) Fortuna Sittard	Free	13 August 2021
DF	(Russia) Roman Tugarinov	(Spain) Espanyol B	On loan	13 August 2021
MF	(Netherlands) Stanley Akoy	No club		6 January 2022
DF	(Netherlands) Jay Kruiver	(Netherlands) Jong Volendam	Free	31 January 2022

=== Out ===
Pos.	Player	Transferred to	Fee	Date
MF	(England) Daniel Adshead	(England) Norwich City F.C.	End of loan	30 June 2021
DF	(Netherlands) Farouq Limouri	(Netherlands) Jong Sparta Rotterdam	End of loan	30 June 2021
GK	(Netherlands) Jasper Schendelaar	(Netherlands) AZ Alkmaar	End of loan	30 June 2021
DF	(Netherlands) Frank Korpershoek	—N/a	End of career	1 July 2021
DF	(Netherlands) Ilias Bronkhorst	(Netherlands) NEC Nijmegen		1 July 2021
DF	(Netherlands) Redouan El Yaakoubi	(Netherlands) Excelsior Rotterdam	Free	1 July 2021
FW	(Haiti) Richelor Sprangers	(Netherlands) SC Kruisland	Free	1 July 2021
MF	(Belgium) Welat Cagro	No club		1 July 2021
DF	(Netherlands) Vincent Regeling	—N/a	End of career	20 July 2021
FW	(Netherlands) Robin Eindhoven	(Netherlands) SV Spakenburg	Free	28 August 2021
DF	(Netherlands) Kick Groot	(Netherlands) ODIN '59	Free	1 September 2021
MF	(Netherlands) Anass Najah	(Cyprus) Akritas Chlorakas	Free	6 September 2021

== Competitions ==
=== Overall record ===
Competition	First match	Last match	Starting round	Final position	Record							
Competition	First match	Last match	Starting round	Final position	Pld	W	D	L	GF	GA	GD	Win %
Eredivisie	6 August 2021	6 May 2022	Week 1	19th	38	8	11	19	47	74	−27	21.05
KNVB Cup	26 October 2021	20 January 2022	1st round	Round of 16	3	2	0	1	8	6	+2	66.67
Total					41	10	11	20	55	80	−25	24.39

Source: ESPN

=== Eerste Divisie ===
==== League table ====
Pos	Team	Pld	W	D	L	GF	GA	GD	Pts	Promotion or qualification
16	MVV Maastricht	38	12	4	22	43	75	−32	40	
17	FC Dordrecht	38	10	9	19	53	77	−24	39	
18	Jong FC Utrecht	38	11	5	22	43	67	−24	38	Reserve teams are not eligible to be promoted to the Eredivisie
19	Telstar	38	8	11	19	47	74	−27	35	
20	Helmond Sport	38	8	7	23	39	72	−33	28 (Note: Helmond Sport were deducted a total of three points for failing to participate in the FC Emmen – Helmond Sport match, which was set on 14 January 2022.)	

Updated to match(es) played on 6 May 2022. Source: Soccerway, Keuken Kampioen Divisie (in Dutch)
Rules for classification: Season in progress: 1) Most points won; 2) Less points lost; 3) Goal difference; 4) Goals scored; 5) Alphabetical order; End of season: 1) Points; 2) Goal difference; 3) Goals scored; 4) Head-to-head points; 5) Head-to-head goal difference; 6) Head-to-head away goals scored; 7) Play-off if relevant for deciding champion, relegation or participating in a European league, otherwise by draw. 8) Penalty shoot-out (only after a play-off)

==== Results summary ====
Overall								Home						Away					
Pld	W	D	L	GF	GA	GD	Pts	W	D	L	GF	GA	GD	W	D	L	GF	GA	GD
38	8	11	19	47	74	−27	35	4	5	10	21	39	−18	4	6	9	26	35	−9

Last updated: 6 May 2022.
Source: https://www.espn.nl/voetbal/team/scorebord/_/id/3735/season/2021/

==== Results by round ====
Round	1	2	3	4	5	6	7	8	9	10	11	12	13	14	15	16	17	18	19	20	21	22	23	24	25	26	27	28	29	30	31	32	33	34	35	36	37	38
Ground	H	A	H	A	A	H	A	H	A	H	A	H	A	H	A	H	A	H	A	H	A	H	H	A	H	A	H	A	H	H	A	A	H	A	A	H	H	A
Result	D	D	L	L	L	D	W	W	W	L	W	D	L	L	D	L	D	L	D	D	L	W	W	D	L	D	D	L	L	W	L	L	L	W	L	L	L	L
Position																																						19

A = Away; H = Home; W = Win; D = Draw; L = Loss

=== Matches ===
==== 1st half ====
6 August 2021 1st week	SC Telstar	1–1	FC Emmen	Velsen-Zuid
20:00	Glynor Plet 4'	Report	Jeredy Hilterman 26'	Stadium: Sportpark Schoonenberg; Attendance: 1,400

13 August 2021 2nd week	NAC Breda	2–2	SC Telstar	Breda
20:00	Pjotr Kestens 19'; Odysseus Velanas 25'	Report	Gyliano van Velzen 76' 87'	Stadium: Rat Verlegh Stadion; Attendance: 10,118

20 August 2021 3rd week	SC Telstar	3–4	Roda JC Kerkrade	Velsen-Zuid
20:00	Cas Dijkstra 25'; Rashaan Fernandes 32'; Glynor Plet 45'	Report	Niek Vossebelt 22'; Stefano Marzo 63'; Xian Emmers 66'; Fabian Serrarens 90+6'	Stadium: Sportpark Schoonenberg; Attendance: 1,824

27 August 2021 4th week	Jong FC Utrecht	3–0	SC Telstar	Utrecht
20:00	Mohamed Mallahi 29'; Ruben Kluivert 40'; Nick Venema 54'	Report		Stadium: Sportcomplex Zoudenbalch; Attendance: 294

5 September 2021 5th week	MVV Maastricht	3–0	SC Telstar	Maastricht
14:30	Mart Remans 13' 22'; Sven Blummel 39'	Report		Stadium: De Geusselt; Attendance: 3,054

10 September 2021 6th week	SC Telstar	1–1	Almere City FC	Velsen-Zuid
20:00	Rein Smit 72'	Report	Lance Duijvestijn 50'	Stadium: Sportpark Schoonenberg; Attendance: 1,563

17 September 2021 7th week	FC Dordrecht	0–1	SC Telstar	Dordrecht
20:00		Report	Özgür Aktaş 71'	Stadium: Stadion Krommedijk; Attendance: 1,358

24 September 2021 8th week	SC Telstar	1–0	Jong AZ	Velsen-Zuid
20:00	Glynor Plet 9'	Report		Stadium: Sportpark Schoonenberg; Attendance: 2,832

1 October 2021 9th week	FC Den Bosch	0–1	SC Telstar	's-Hertogenbosch
20:00		Report	Rein Smit 90+3'	Stadium: De Vliert; Attendance: 2,807

15 October 2021 10th week	SC Telstar	1–5	FC Volendam	Velsen-Zuid
20:00	Özgür Aktaş 12'	Report	Ibrahim El Kadiri 15'; Robert Mühren 19' 39'; Daryl van Mieghem 21'; Jim Beers 67'	Stadium: Sportpark Schoonenberg; Attendance: 2,615

18 October 2021 11th week	Jong PSV	2–3	SC Telstar	Eindhoven
20:00	Mathias Kjølø 54'; Ismael Saibari 60'	Report	Glynor Plet 5'; Rashaan Fernandes 13'; Ozan Kökçü 80'	Stadium: De Herdgang; Attendance: 328

22 October 2021 12th week	SC Telstar	2–2	Helmond Sport	Velsen-Zuid
20:00	Anwar Bensabouh 31'; Cas Dijkstra 33'	Report	Jellert Van Landschoot 37'; Jelle Goselink 71'	Stadium: Sportpark Schoonenberg; Attendance: 1,625

1 November 2021 13th week	Jong Ajax	3–0	SC Telstar	Duivendrecht, Amsterdam
20:00	Danilo 16'; Naci Ünüvar 60' 66'	Report		Stadium: Sportpark De Toekomst; Attendance: 850

6 November 2021 14th week	SC Telstar	2–5	Excelsior Rotterdam	Velsen-Zuid
16:30	Cas Dijkstra 10'; Rein Smit 89'	Report	Thijs Dallinga 17' 33' (pen.) 36' 49'; Julian Baas 58'	Stadium: Sportpark Schoonenberg; Attendance: 2,763

14 November 2021 15th week	De Graafschap	1–1	SC Telstar	Doetinchem
14:30	Joey Konings 55'	Report	Glynor Plet 86' (pen.)	Stadium: De Vijverberg

19 November 2021 16th week	SC Telstar	0–2	ADO Den Haag	Velsen-Zuid
20:00		Report	Thomas Verheydt 37'; Vicente Besuijen 44'	Stadium: Sportpark Schoonenberg

26 November 2021 17th week	TOP Oss	1–1	SC Telstar	Oss
20:00	Jearl Margaritha 29'	Report	Cas Dijkstra 51'	Stadium: Frans Heesen Stadion

3 December 2021 18th week	SC Telstar	1–3	ADO Den Haag	Velsen-Zuid
20:00	Özgür Aktaş 57'	Report	Mitchell van Rooijen 15'; Brian Koglin 75'; Yahcuroo Roemer 90+2'	Stadium: Sportpark Schoonenberg

10 December 2021 19th week	FC Eindhoven	1–1	SC Telstar	Eindhoven
20:00	Joey Sleegers 22'	Report	Rashaan Fernandes 83'	Stadium: Jan Louwers Stadion

17 December 2021 20th week	SC Telstar	0–0	Jong PSV	Velsen-Zuid
20:00		Report		Stadium: Sportpark Schoonenberg

==== 2nd half ====
9 January 2022 21st week	FC Volendam	2–1	SC Telstar	Volendam
12:15	Mike Eerdhuijzen 30'; Robert Mühren 36'	Report	Glynor Plet 5'	Stadium: Kras Stadion

14 January 2022 22nd week	SC Telstar	2–1	MVV Maastricht	Velsen-Zuid
20:00	Glynor Plet 8'; Özgür Aktaş 26'	Report	Clint Essers 90+1'	Stadium: Sportpark Schoonenberg

23 January 2022 23rd week	SC Telstar	1–0	Jong Ajax	Velsen-Zuid
14:30	Rein Smit 26'	Report		Stadium: Sportpark Schoonenberg

30 January 2022 24th week	Almere City FC	0–0	SC Telstar	Almere
14:30		Report		Stadium: Yanmar Stadion; Attendance: 1,523

4 February 2022 25th week	SC Telstar	0–3	De Graafschap	Velsen-Zuid
20:00		Report	Johnatan Opoku 5'; Sam Hendriks 26' 29'	Stadium: Sportpark Schoonenberg; Attendance: 1,000

11 February 2022 26th week	Helmond Sport	2–2	SC Telstar	Helmond
20:00	Arno Van Keilegom 42'; Jelle Goselink 69'	Report	Rein Smit 17'; Sven van Doorm 62'	Stadium: Stadion De Braak; Attendance: 1,339

4 March 2022 27th week	SC Telstar	2–2	TOP Oss	Velsen-Zuid
20:00	Rein Smit 20'; Anwar Bensabouh 90+2'	Report	Joshua Sanches 42'; Kay Tejan 58'	Stadium: Sportpark Schoonenberg

7 March 2022 28th week	Jong AZ	3–2	SC Telstar	The Hague
20:00	Zico Buurmeester 26' 40'; Iman Griffith 76'	Report	Rein Smit 20'; Glynor Plet 33'	Stadium: AFAS Trainingscomplex; Attendance: 400

14 March 2022 29th week	SC Telstar	1–4	NAC Breda	Velsen-Zuid
20:00	Roscello Vlijter 9'	Report	Odysseus Velanas 19' 68'; Jeredy Hilterman 30'; Boris van Schuppen 90+2'	Stadium: Sportpark Schoonenberg; Attendance: 2,268

18 March 2022 30th week	SC Telstar	1–0	FC Dordrecht	Velsen-Zuid
20:00	Glynor Plet 75'	Report		Stadium: Sportpark Schoonenberg; Attendance: 1,823

21 March 2022 31st week	ADO Den Haag	2–1	SC Telstar	The Hague
20:00	Thomas Verheydt 53' (pen.); Amar Ćatić 86'	Report	Glynor Plet 82'	Stadium: Cars Jeans Stadion; Attendance: 4,123; Referee: Robin Hensgens

27 March 2022 32nd week	FC Emmen	2–1	SC Telstar	Emmen
16:45	Rui Mendes 36'; Jari Vlak 49'	Report	Glynor Plet 45'	Stadium: De Oude Meerdijk; Attendance: 7,704; Referee: Sam Droge

1 April 2022 33rd week	SC Telstar	1–2	FC Den Bosch	Velsen-Zuid
20:00	Glynor Plet 59'	Report	Victor van den Bogert 40'; Soufyan Ahannach 76'	Stadium: Sportpark Schoonenberg; Attendance: 1,435; Referee: Martin Fernando Perezlindo

8 April 2022 34th week	Excelsior Rotterdam	1–4	SC Telstar	Rotterdam
20:00	Mats Wieffer 40'	Report	Sven van Doorm 5'; Jip Molenaar 28'; Ozan Kökçü 52' (pen.); Anwar Bensabouh 90+1'	Stadium: Stadion Woudestein; Attendance: 3,063; Referee: Alex Bos

15 April 2022 35th week	VVV-Venlo	3–2	SC Telstar	Venlo
20:00	Sven Braken 25' 55' 60'	Report	Özgür Aktaş 75'; Glynor Plet 80'	Stadium: Covebo Stadion – De Koel; Attendance: 5,562; Referee: Michael Eijgelsheim

22 April 2022 36th week	SC Telstar	0–1	FC Eindhoven	Velsen-Zuid
20:00		Report	Joey Sleegers 82' (pen.)	Stadium: Sportpark Schoonenberg; Attendance: 2,746; Referee: Martijn Vos

29 April 2022 37th week	SC Telstar	1–3	Jong FC Utrecht	Velsen-Zuid
20:00	Rashaan Fernandes 80'	Report	Derensili Sanches Fernandes 7'; Mohamed Mallahi 84'; Oussama Alou 87'	Stadium: Sportpark Schoonenberg; Attendance: 2,278; Referee: Jesse Rozendal

6 May 2022 38th week	Roda JC Kerkrade	4–3	SC Telstar	Kerkrade
20:00	Patrick Pflücke 6' 87' (pen.); Guus Joppen 75'; Dylan Vente 85'	Report	Giovanni 10' 34'; Anwar Bensabouh 67'	Stadium: Parkstad Limburg Stadion; Attendance: 8,487; Referee: Jannick van der Laan

=== KNVB Cup ===
26 October 2021 1st round	Kozakken Boys	1–2 (a.e.t.)	SC Telstar	Werkendam
20:00	Sven van Ingen 90+3'	Report	Glynor Plet 24' (pen.); Tom Overtoom 104'	Stadium: De Zwaaier

14 December 2021 2nd round	SC Telstar	5–3 (a.e.t.)	SV Spakenburg	Velsen-Zuid
21:00	Yassine Zakir 24'; Gyliano van Velzen 38'; Delvechio Blackson 48'; Jip Molenaar 97'; Rashaan Fernandes 114'	Report	Floris van der Linden 36' 68'; Lowie van Zundert 78'	Stadium: Sportpark Schoonenberg

20 January 2022 Round of 16	PSV Eindhoven	2–1	SC Telstar	Eindhoven
18:45	Bruma 32'; Joey Veerman 61'	Report	Özgür Aktaş 17'	Stadium: Philips Stadion

== Statistics ==
=== Scorers ===
#	Player	Eerste Divisie	KNVB	Total
1	(Netherlands) Glynor Plet	13	1	14
2	(Netherlands) Rein Smit	7	0	7
3	(Netherlands) Özgür Aktaş	5	1	6
4	(Netherlands) Rashaan Fernandes	4	1	5
5	(Netherlands) Anwar Bensabouh	4	0	4
5	(Netherlands) Cas Dijkstra	4	0	4
7	(Netherlands) Gyliano van Velzen	2	1	3
8	(Netherlands) Jip Molenaar	1	1	2
8	(Azerbaijan) Ozan Kökçü	2	0	2
8	(Netherlands) Sven van Doorm	2	0	2
11	(Suriname) Delvechio Blackson	0	1	1
11	(Netherlands) Tom Overtoom	0	1	1
11	(Netherlands) Yassine Zakir	0	1	1

=== Appearances ===
#	Player	Eerste Divisie	KNVB	Total
1	(Netherlands) Sven van Doorm	37	3	40
2	(Netherlands) Özgür Aktaş	36	3	39
3	(Netherlands) Glynor Plet	36	2	38
4	(England) Rashaan Fernandes	33	3	36
5	(Netherlands) Cas Dijkstra	32	2	34
5	(Netherlands) Yassine Zakir	31	3	34
7	(Netherlands) Gyliano van Velzen	30	3	33
8	(Netherlands) Ozan Kökçü	29	3	32
9	(Netherlands) Jip Molenaar	27	3	30
10	(Netherlands) Tom Overtoom	27	1	28
10	(Netherlands) Rein Smit	25	3	28
12	(Suriname) Delvechio Blackson	25	2	27
13	(Netherlands) Anwar Bensabouh	23	1	24
14	(Belgium) Siebe Vandermeulen	20	2	22
14	(Netherlands) Yaël Liesdek	20	2	22
16	(Netherlands) Anthony Berenstein	18	2	20
16	(Suriname) Roscello Vlijter	18	2	20
18	(Netherlands) Ronald Koeman Jr.	16	1	17
19	(Brazil) Giovanni	15	1	16
20	(Curaçao) Trevor Doornbusch	13	1	14
20	(Russia) Roman Tugarinov	12	2	14
22	(Netherlands) Randy Wolters	13	0	13
23	(Netherlands) Jay Kruiver	12	0	12
23	(Netherlands) Abdel El Ouazzane	11	1	12
25	(Netherlands) Niels van Wetten	9	1	10
25	(Netherlands) Stanley Akoy	9	1	10
27	(Netherlands) Tyrese Gemert	3	0	3
27	(Netherlands) Redouan Taha	2	1	3
29	(Netherlands) Marouan El Ouardani	1	0	1

=== Clean sheets ===
#	Player	Eerste Divisie
1	(Netherlands) Ronald Koeman Jr.	6
2	(Netherlands) Abdel El Ouazzane	1
Total		7

=== Disciplinary record ===
#	Player	Eerste Divisie		KNVB		Total	
#	Player	Yellow card	Red card	Yellow card	Red card	Yellow card	Red card
1	(Netherlands) Glynor Plet	6	0	0	1	6	1
2	(Netherlands) Randy Wolters	3	1	0	0	3	1
2	(Russia) Roman Tugarinov	3	1	0	0	3	1
4	(Russia) Özgür Aktaş	7	0	0	0	7	0
5	(Suriname) Roscello Vlijter	4	0	1	0	5	0
6	(Netherlands) Tom Overtoom	4	0	0	0	4	0
7	(Netherlands) Niels van Wetten	3	0	0	0	3	0
7	(Netherlands) Yaël Liesdek	3	0	0	0	3	0
7	(Netherlands) Yassine Zakir	3	0	0	0	3	0
7	(Netherlands) Rein Smit	2	0	1	0	3	0
11	(Netherlands) Anwar Bensabouh	2	0	0	0	2	0
11	(Netherlands) Jip Molenaar	2	0	0	0	2	0
11	(Azerbaijan) Ozan Kökçü	2	0	0	0	2	0
11	(Azerbaijan) Rashaan Fernandes	2	0	0	0	2	0
15	(Netherlands) Cas Dijkstra	1	0	0	0	1	0
15	(Suriname) Delvechio Blackson	1	0	0	0	1	0
15	(Brazil) Giovanni	1	0	0	0	1	0
15	(Netherlands) Jay Kruiver	1	0	0	0	1	0
15	(Netherlands) Ronald Koeman Jr.	1	0	0	0	1	0
15	(Belgium) Siebe Vandermeulen	1	0	0	0	1	0
15	(Netherlands) Stanley Akoy	1	0	0	0	1	0
15	(Curaçao) Trevor Doornbusch	1	0	0	0	1	0
15	(Netherlands) Anthony Berenstein	0	0	1	0	1	0
