= 2021–22 KNVB Cup =

Association football competition

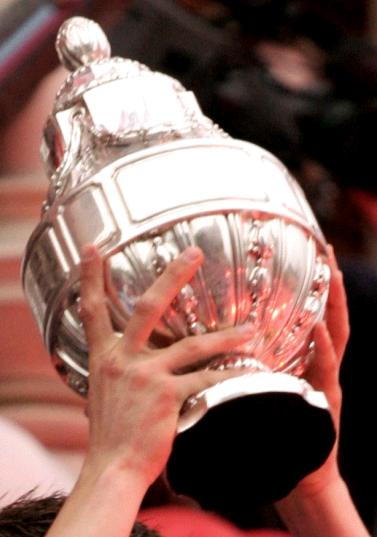
- KNVB Cup trophy

Tournament details
- Country: Netherlands
- Venue(s): De Kuip, Rotterdam
- Dates: 14 August 2021 – 17 April 2022
- Teams: 59 (90 including preliminaries)

Final positions
- Champions: PSV (10th title)
- Runners-up: Ajax

Tournament statistics
- Matches played: 89
- Goals scored: 308 (3.46 per match)
- Top goal scorer(s): Danilo (6 goals)

The 2021–22 KNVB Cup, for sponsoring reasons officially called the TOTO KNVB Beker, was the 104th edition of the Dutch national football annual knockout tournament for the KNVB Cup. 59 teams contested, beginning in August with the first of two preliminary rounds, and concluded on 17 April 2022 with the final played at De Kuip in Rotterdam.

Ajax unsuccessfully defended its 2021 title in PSV's successful pursuit of their 10th KNVB Cup, 2–1.

PSV contested the 2022 Johan Cruyff Shield against 2021–22 Eredivisie champions Ajax.

== Schedule ==
Round	Draw	Match Dates
First preliminary round	15 July 2021	14 August 2021
Second preliminary round	19 August 2021	21–23 September 2021
First round	25 September 2021	26–28 October 2021
Second round	30 October 2021	14–16 December 2021
Round of 16	18 December 2021	18–20 January 2022
Quarter-finals	22 January 2022	8–10 February 2022
Semi-finals	22 January 2022	2–3 March 2022
Final	22 January 2022	17 April 2022

== First preliminary round ==
24 amateur teams qualified for this stage, with twelve teams receiving a bye to the second preliminary round. The draw for the first preliminary round was performed on 15 July 2020. The draw was conducted by Oskar van Logtestijn, player of vv Hoogland.

14 August 2021	Blauw Geel’38/JUMBO (4)	1–2	FC Lisse (4)	Veghel
17:00 CEST		Report		Stadium: Sportpark Prins W. Alexander

14 August 2021	Hollandia (4)	1–5	ACV (4)	Hoorn
17:00 CEST		Report		Stadium: Juliana Sportpark

14 August 2021	DEM RKVV (4)	1–1 (a.e.t.) (4–5 p)	Sparta Nijkerk (4)	Beverwijk
17:00 CEST		Report		Stadium: RKVV DEM

14 August 2021	HSC '21 (4)	1–1 (a.e.t.) (9–8 p)	Excelsior '31 (4)	Haaksbergen
17:00 CEST	Ottik 96'	Report	Beverdam 102'	Stadium: Groot Scholtenhagen

14 August 2021	Ajax (amateurs) (4)	2–1	EVV Echt (4)	Amsterdam
17:00 CEST	Bartels 7'; Smal 13'	Report	Peters 63'	Stadium: Sportpark De Toekomst

14 August 2021	JOS Watergraafsmeer (4)	1–5	Ter Leede (4)	Amsterdam
17:00 CEST		Report		Stadium: Sportpark Drieburg

== Second preliminary round ==
The second preliminary round was contested by the six winners from the first preliminary round, the twelve teams which got a bye from the preliminary round, and the clubs from the Tweede Divisie and the amateur clubs which were disqualified from last year's cup due to the COVID-19 pandemic in the Netherlands. The matches were played from 21 September through 23 September 2021. The draw took place on 19 August 2021.

21 September 2021	Achilles Veen (5)	3–2 (a.e.t.)	DTS Ede (6)	Veen
20:00 CEST		Report		Stadium: De Heuye

21 September 2021	Ajax (amateurs) (4)	4–1	VVSB (4)	Amsterdam
20:00 CEST	van Aggele 61' van der Slot 67' (o.g.); Moussa 68' de Jong 90+3'	Report	Halman 86'	Stadium: Sportpark De Toekomst

21 September 2021	VV Goes (4)	1–2	VV DOVO (4)	Goes
20:00 CEST		Report		Stadium: Sportpark Het Schenge

21 September 2021	DVS '33 (4)	2–2 (a.e.t.) (4–2 p)	VV Noordwijk (3)	Ermelo
20:00 CEST				Stadium: Sportpark Zuid

21 September 2021	HHC Hardenberg (3)	0–2 (a.e.t.)	VV Capelle (5)	Hardenberg
20:00 CEST				Stadium: De Boshoek

21 September 2021	FC Lisse (4)	1–2	AFC (3)	Lisse
20:00 CEST				Stadium: Ter Specke

21 September 2021	ASWH (3)	1–0	HV & CV Quick (4)	Hendrik-Ido-Ambacht
20:00 CEST				Stadium: Sportpark Schildman

21 September 2021	IJsselmeervogels (3)	3–1 (a.e.t.)	Sportlust '46 (4)	Spakenburg
20:00 CEST	Tadmine 43'; Poepon 91'; Tekfaoui 93'	Report	Verhagen 69'	Stadium: Sportpark De Westmaat; Attendance: 1,250

21 September 2021	HSV Hoek (4)	2–3	SteDoCo (4)	Hoek
20:00 CEST				Stadium: Sportpark Denoek

21 September 2021	GVVV (3)	3–1 (a.e.t.)	VVOG (4)	Veenendaal
20:00 CEST				Stadium: Sportpark Panhuis

21 September 2021	BVV Barendrecht (4)	3–0	SVV Scheveningen (3)	Barendrecht
20:00 CEST				Stadium: Sportpark De Bongerd

21 September 2021	VV Katwijk (3)	2–3	Harkemase Boys (4)	Katwijk
20:00 CEST				Stadium: Sportpark De Krom

21 September 2021	Quick Boys (3)	0–2	Rijnsburgse Boys (3)	Katwijk aan Zee
20:00 CEST				Stadium: Nieuw Zuid

21 September 2021	Sparta Nijkerk (4)	2–0 (a.e.t.)	VV Sliedrecht (6)	Nijkerk
20:00 CEST				Stadium: De Ebbenhorst

21 September 2021	ODIN '59 (4)	1–2	De Treffers (3)	Heemskerk
20:00 CEST				Stadium: Sportpark Assumburg

22 September 2021	Kozakken Boys (3)	2–0	RKSV Groene Ster (4)	Werkendam
20:00 CEST				Stadium: De Zwaaier

22 September 2021	SV Spakenburg (3)	5–2	VV UNA (4)	Spakenburg
20:00 CEST				Stadium: Sportpark De Westmaat

22 September 2021	USV Hercules (4)	1–1 (a.e.t.) (3–4 p)	ACV (4)	Utrecht
20:00 CEST				Stadium: Sportpark Voordorp

22 September 2021	ADO '20 (4)	2–1	Koninklijke HFC (3)	Heemskerk
20:00 CEST				Stadium: Sportpark de Vlotter

22 September 2021	GVV Unitas (4)	1–0	Ter Leede (4)	Gorinchem
20:00 CEST				Stadium: Sportpark Molenvliet

22 September 2021	OSS '20 (4)	2–1	HSC '21 (4)	Oss
20:00 CEST				Stadium: Sportpark De Rusheuvel

22 September 2021	OFC Oostzaan (4)	0–2 (a.e.t.)	Excelsior Maassluis (3)	Oostzaan
20:00 CEST				Stadium: Sportpark OFC

22 September 2021	VV Gemert (4)	3–1	SV TEC (3)	Gemert
20:00 CEST				Stadium: Sportpark Molenbroek

22 September 2021	VV Hoogland (4)	0–1	RKVV Westlandia (4)	Hoogland
20:00 CEST				Stadium: Sportpark Langenoord

22 September 2021	VV Staphorst (4)	3–1	VV Dongen (4)	Staphorst
20:00 CEST				Stadium: Het Noorderslag

== First round ==
The teams which participated in this round consisted of the 25 amateur teams which won their match in the second qualifying round, all sixteen professional teams from the Eerste Divisie, and thirteen clubs from the Eredivisie. Ajax, AZ, Feyenoord, PSV and Vitesse automatically advanced to the second round due to their participation in the European club competitions. The matches were played on 26, 27 and 28 October 2021.

26 October 2021	SteDoCo (4)	0–5	FC Utrecht (1)	Hoornaar
18:45 CEST				Stadium: Sportpark SteDoCo

26 October 2021	FC Volendam (2)	0–3	Emmen (2)	Volendam
20:00 CEST				Stadium: Kras Stadion

26 October 2021	Kozakken Boys (3)	1–2 (a.e.t.)	Telstar (2)	Werkendam
20:00 CEST				Stadium: Sportpark De Zwaaier

26 October 2021	Sparta Nijkerk (4)	0–2	ADO Den Haag (2)	Nijkerk
20:00 CEST				Stadium: Sportpark De Ebbenhorst

26 October 2021	ACV (4)	0–3	MVV Maastricht (2)	Assen
20:00 CEST				Stadium: Univé Sportpark

26 October 2021	DVS '33 (4)	2–1	Eindhoven (2)	Ermelo
20:00 CEST				Stadium: Sportlaan

26 October 2021	ASWH (3)	1–3	Heracles Almelo (1)	Hendrik-Ido-Ambacht
20:00 CEST				Stadium: Sportpark Schildman

26 October 2021	SV Spakenburg (3)	3–0	Dordrecht (2)	Spakenburg
20:00 CEST				Stadium: SV Spakenburg

26 October 2021	PEC Zwolle (1)	4–1	De Graafschap (2)	Zwolle
20:00 CEST				Stadium: MAC³PARK Stadion

26 October 2021	Roda JC (2)	2–1	FC Den Bosch (2)	Kerkrade
20:00 CEST				Stadium: Parkstad Limburg Stadion

26 October 2021	NAC Breda (2)	1–1 (a.e.t.) (4–2 p)	VVV-Venlo (2)	Breda
21:00 CEST				Stadium: Rat Verlegh Stadion

27 October 2021	OSS '20 (4)	0–2	FC Twente (1)	Oss
18:45 CEST				Stadium: Frans Heesen Stadion

27 October 2021	RKVV Westlandia (4)	2–5	Excelsior Maassluis (3)	Naaldwijk
20:00 CEST				Stadium: Sportpark De Hoge Bomen

27 October 2021	Almere City (2)	0–2	Go Ahead Eagles (1)	Almere
20:00 CEST				Stadium: Yanmar Stadion

27 October 2021	Harkemase Boys (4)	2–1 (a.e.t.)	DOVO (4)	Harkema
20:00 CEST				Stadium: Sportpark De Bosk

27 October 2021	ADO '20 (4)	2–3 (a.e.t.)	Barendrecht (4)	Heemskerk
20:00 CEST				Stadium: Sportpark De Vlotter

27 October 2021	VV Capelle (5)	0–3	NEC (1)	Capelle aan den IJssel
20:00 CEST				Stadium: Sportpark 't Slot

27 October 2021	IJsselmeervogels (3)	0–3	Excelsior (2)	Spakenburg
20:00 CEST				Stadium: Sportpark De Westmaat

27 October 2021	GVVV (3)	0–2	Sparta Rotterdam (1)	Veenendaal
20:00 CEST				Stadium: Sportpark Panhuis

27 October 2021	AFC (3)	1–2	SC Heerenveen (1)	Amsterdam
20:00 CEST				Stadium: Sportpark Goed Genoeg

27 October 2021	Achilles Veen (5)	4–0	GVV Unitas (4)	Veen
20:00 CEST				Stadium: Sportpark De Hanen Weide

27 October 2021	Fortuna Sittard (1)	3–0	TOP (2)	Sittard
20:00 CEST				Stadium: Fortuna Sittard Stadion

27 October 2021	De Treffers (3)	2–2 (a.e.t.) (6–5 p)	Rijnsburgse Boys (3)	Groesbeek
20:00 CEST				Stadium: Sportpark Goed Genoeg

27 October 2021	Staphorst (4)	0–3	Gemert (4)	Staphorst
20:00 CEST				Stadium: Sportpark Het Noorderslag

27 October 2021	FC Groningen (1)	4–0	Helmond Sport (2)	Groningen
21:00 CEST				Stadium: Euroborg

28 October 2021	Ajax (amateurs) (4)	0–5	Cambuur (1)	Amsterdam
18:45 CEST				Stadium: Sportpark De Toekomst

28 October 2021	RKC Waalwijk (1)	3–0	Willem II (1)	Waalwijk
21:00 CEST				Stadium: Mandemakers Stadion

== Second round ==
The matches for the second round were played on 14, 15 and 16 December 2021. The five clubs which were playing in one of the various European club competitions as well as the 27 winners of the first round participated in this round. The draw was performed on 30 October 2021.

14 December 2021	ADO Den Haag (2)	4–2	Gemert (4)	The Hague
18:00 CET(UTC+1)	Elia 44'; Seedorf 67'; Verheydt 76', 80'		38', 64' Den Dekker	Stadium: Cars Jeans Stadion

14 December 2021	PEC Zwolle (1)	4–0	MVV Maastricht (2)	Zwolle
18:00 CET(UTC+1)	Voet 14'; Van den Berg 20'; Adžić 62'; Tedić 70'			Stadium: MAC³PARK Stadion

14 December 2021	FC Emmen (2)	0–1	Excelsior Maassluis (3)	Emmen
20:00 CET(UTC+1)			81' Wennekers	Stadium: De Oude Meerdijk

14 December 2021	NAC Breda (2)	3–2	FC Utrecht (1)	Breda
21:00 CET(UTC+1)	Haye 55', 70'; Kotzebue 90+2'		34' Van der Hoorn; 86' Douvikas	Stadium: Rat Verlegh Stadion

14 December 2021	Telstar (2)	5–3 (a.e.t.)	SV Spakenburg (3)	Velsen
21:00 CET(UTC+1)	Zakir 24'; Van Velzen 38'; Blackson 48'; Molenaar 97'; Fernandes 114'		36', 78' Van der Linden; 68' Van Zundert	Stadium: Rabobank IJmond Stadion

15 December 2021	FC Twente (1)	2–1 (a.e.t.)	Feyenoord (1)	Enschede
18:00 CET(UTC+1)	Troupée 79'; Ugalde 114'		47' Dessers	Stadium: De Grolsch Veste

15 December 2021	AZ (1)	4–1	Heracles Almelo (1)	Alkmaar
18:00 CET(UTC+1)	Pavlidis 2'; Karlsson 39', 76'; Barası 85'		43' Başaçıkoğlu	Stadium: AFAS Stadion

15 December 2021	Vitesse (1)	2–1	Sparta Rotterdam (1)	Arnhem
18:00 CET(UTC+1)	Baden Frederiksen 42', 80'		33' (pen.) Van Crooij	Stadium: GelreDome

15 December 2021	Harkemase Boys (4)	0–5	RKC Waalwijk (1)	Harkema
18:00 CET(UTC+1)			41' Oukili; 43', 63' Stokkers; 88' Lutonda; 89' Bakari	Stadium: De Bosk

15 December 2021	Excelsior (2)	2–4 (a.e.t.)	FC Groningen (1)	Rotterdam
20:00 CET(UTC+1)	Niemeijer 23'; Baas 69'		45+1' Ngonge; 85' (pen.) El Hankouri; 111', 115' Strand Larsen	Stadium: Van Donge & De Roo Stadion

15 December 2021	Go Ahead Eagles (1)	2–0	Roda JC (2)	Deventer
21:00 CET(UTC+1)	Lidberg 5', 29'			Stadium: De Adelaarshorst

15 December 2021	PSV (1)	2–0	Fortuna Sittard (1)	Eindhoven
21:00 CET(UTC+1)	Dōan 28', 62'			Stadium: Philips Stadion

15 December 2021	Ajax (1)	4–0	Barendrecht (4)	Amsterdam
21:00 CET(UTC+1)	Taylor 10'; Danilo 12' (pen.), 49'; Hlynsson 89' (pen.)			Stadium: Johan Cruyff Arena

16 December 2021	Cambuur (1)	1–2	NEC (1)	Leeuwarden
18:00 CET(UTC+1)	Hendriks 57'		2' Romeny; 41' Proper	Stadium: Cambuur Stadion

16 December 2021	Achilles Veen (5)	0–2	DVS '33 (4)	Veen
20:00 CET(UTC+1)			6' van Hilten; 48' Akla	Stadium: De Heuye

16 December 2021	SC Heerenveen (1)	2–0	De Treffers (3)	Heerenveen
21:00 CET(UTC+1)	De Jong 74'; J. Veerman 88'			Stadium: Abe Lenstra Stadion

== Round of 16 ==
The matches for the round of 16 were played on 18, 19 and 20 January 2022. The draw was performed on 18 December 2021.

18 January 2022	RKC Waalwijk (1)	4–2 (a.e.t.)	ADO Den Haag (2)	Waalwijk
18:45 CET(UTC+1)	Kuijpers 18'; Odgaard 75', 105', 116'		26' (o.g.) El Maach; 41' Verheydt	Stadium: Mandemakers Stadion

18 January 2022	Vitesse (1)	2–0	DVS '33 (4)	Arnhem
20:00 CET(UTC+1)	Huisman 22'; Openda 57'			Stadium: GelreDome

18 January 2022	SC Heerenveen (1)	0–1	Go Ahead Eagles (1)	Heerenveen
21:00 CET(UTC+1)			15' Córdoba	Stadium: Abe Lenstra Stadion

19 January 2022	FC Groningen (1)	1–2	NEC (1)	Groningen
18:45 CET(UTC+1)	De Leeuw 45'		10' Verdonk; 48' Duelund	Stadium: Euroborg

19 January 2022	NAC Breda (2)	2–1	PEC Zwolle (1)	Breda
20:00 CET(UTC+1)	Bannis 13'; De Rooij 84'		5' Saymak	Stadium: Rat Verlegh Stadion; Attendance: 0

19 January 2022	FC Twente (1)	1–2	AZ (1)	Enschede
21:00 CET(UTC+1)	Van Wolfswinkel 48' (pen.)		63' (o.g.) Pleguezuelo; 82' Pavlidis	Stadium: De Grolsch Veste

20 January 2022	PSV (1)	2–1	Telstar (2)	Eindhoven
20:00 CET(UTC+1)	Bruma 32'; Veerman 61'		17' Aktaş	Stadium: Philips Stadion; Referee: Rob Dieperink

20 January 2022	Ajax (1)	9–0	Excelsior Maassluis (3)	Amsterdam
21:00 CET(UTC+1)	Tagliafico 9'; Danilo 21' (pen.), 26', 37', 55'; Regeer 41'; Hlynsson 64'; Daramy 66', 84'			Stadium: Johan Cruyff Arena; Attendance: 0 Referee: Sander van der Eijk

== Quarter-finals ==
The matches for the quarter-finals were played on 8, 9 and 10 February 2022. The draw was performed on 22 January 2022.

8 February 2022	PSV (1)	4–0	NAC Breda (2)	Eindhoven
19:00 CET (UTC+1)	Madueke 8'; Götze 28', 40'; Gakpo 79'	Report		Stadium: Philips Stadion; Attendance: 12,500; Referee: Martin van den Kerkhof

9 February 2022	RKC Waalwijk (1)	0–4	AZ (1)	Waalwijk
19:00 CET (UTC+1)		Report	De Wit 8'; Pavlidis 23'; Karlsson 33' (pen.); Aboukhlal 71'	Stadium: Mandemakers Stadion; Attendance: 1,543; Referee: Edwin van de Graaf

9 February 2022	Ajax (1)	5–0	Vitesse (1)	Amsterdam
19:00 CET (UTC+1)	Antony 17', 62'; Haller 30', 46'; Tadić 51'	Report		Stadium: Johan Cruyff Arena; Referee: Bas Nijhuis

10 February 2022	NEC (1)	0–2	Go Ahead Eagles (1)	Nijmegen
19:00 CET (UTC+1)		Report	Brouwers 19' (pen.); Botos 27'	Stadium: Goffertstadion; Referee: Danny Makkelie

== Semi-finals ==
The matches for the semi-finals were played on 2 and 3 March 2022. The first part of the draw was performed on 22 January 2022 with the teams playing at home being decided. The second part of the draw was performed on 12 February 2022.

2 March 2022	Go Ahead Eagles (1)	1–2	PSV (1)	Deventer
20:00 CET (UTC+1)	Córdoba 36'	Report	Zahavi 43'; Veerman 68'	Stadium: De Adelaarshorst; Referee: Pol van Boekel

3 March 2022	AZ (1)	0–2	Ajax (1)	Alkmaar
20:00 CET (UTC+1)		Report	Berghuis 11'; Klaassen 89'	Stadium: AFAS Stadium; Referee: Serdar Gözübüyük

== Final ==
17 April 2022
18:00 UTC+02:00

PSV	2–1	Ajax
Gutiérrez 48'; Gakpo 50'	Report	Gravenberch 23'

De Kuip, Rotterdam
Attendance: 42,824
Referee: Danny Makkelie
