= 2020–21 SC Heerenveen season =

Season of a Dutch football club

SC Heerenveen
2020–21 season
- Chairman: Cees Roozemond
- Manager: Johnny Jansen
- Stadium: Abe Lenstra Stadion
- Eredivisie: 12th
- KNVB Cup: Semi-finals
- Top goalscorer: League: Henk Veerman (11); All: Henk Veerman (11)
Home colours	Away colours	Third colours

The 2020–21 season was SC Heerenveen's 56th season in existence and the club's 28th consecutive season in the top flight of Dutch football. In addition to the domestic league, SC Heerenveen participated in this season's edition of the KNVB Cup. The season covered the period from 1 July 2020 to 30 June 2021.

== Players ==
=== First-team squad ===
As of 12 February 2021

Note: Flags indicate national team as defined under FIFA eligibility rules; some limited exceptions apply. Players may hold more than one non-FIFA nationality.

No.	Pos.	Nation	Player
1	GK	NED	Erwin Mulder
2	DF	NED	Sherel Floranus
3	DF	NED	Jan Paul van Hecke (on loan from Brighton & Hove Albion)
4	DF	URU	Joaquín Fernández
5	DF	NED	Lucas Woudenberg
6	MF	NED	Siem de Jong
7	FW	USA	Ulysses Llanez (on loan from VfL Wolfsburg)
8	FW	SWE	Benjamin Nygren (on loan from Genk)
9	FW	NED	Henk Veerman (captain)
10	MF	GER	Oliver Batista Meier (on loan from Bayern Munich)
11	FW	NED	Mitchell van Bergen
13	MF	BUL	Stanislav Shopov
14	DF	KOS	Ibrahim Drešević
15	MF	BEL	Sieben Dewaele (on loan from Anderlecht)
16	FW	NED	Arjen van der Heide

No.	Pos.	Nation	Player
17	MF	SWE	Rami Hajal
18	MF	NED	Hamdi Akujobi
19	MF	NED	Jan Ras
20	MF	NED	Joey Veerman
21	MF	NED	Rodney Kongolo
22	GK	ISR	Ariel Harush
23	GK	NED	Jan Bekkema
24	GK	NED	Jaimy Kroesen
25	DF	POL	Paweł Bochniewicz
26	FW	NED	Rein Smit
37	FW	NED	Couhaib Driouech
41	DF	SWE	Rami Kaib
42	MF	NED	Syb van Ottele
43	MF	DEN	Lasse Schöne
44	MF	CRO	Tibor Halilović

=== Out on loan ===
Note: Flags indicate national team as defined under FIFA eligibility rules; some limited exceptions apply. Players may hold more than one non-FIFA nationality.

No.	Pos.	Nation	Player
—	FW	NOR	Runar Espejord (at Tromsø IL until 30 June 2021)

== Transfers ==
=== In ===
No.	Pos	Player	Transferred from	Fee	Date	Source
15			TBD		1 July 2020	

=== Out ===
No.	Pos	Player	Transferred to	Fee	Date	Source
15			TBD		1 July 2020	

== Pre-season and friendlies ==
Win Draw Loss Fixtures

1 August 2020 Friendly	NAC Breda (Netherlands)	1–0	(Netherlands) SC Heerenveen	Breda, Netherlands
16:30 CEST (UTC+2)	Stokkers 89'	Report		Stadium: Rat Verlegh Stadion; Referee: Martin van den Kerkhof

7 August 2020 Friendly	SC Heerenveen (Netherlands)	1–2	(Netherlands) Vitesse	Heerenveen, Netherlands
18:00 CEST (UTC+2)	Ejuke 43'	Report	Bero 5'; Buitink 15'	Stadium: Abe Lenstra Stadion; Referee: Siemen Mulder

15 August 2020 Friendly	De Graafschap (Netherlands)	5–1	(Netherlands) SC Heerenveen	Doetinchem, Netherlands
16:30 CEST (UTC+2)	Hamdaoui 31'; Van de Pavert 48'; Konings 50', 90'; Van Mieghem 67'	Report	Smit 79'	Stadium: De Vijverberg

20 August 2020 Friendly	Utrecht (Netherlands)	4–1	(Netherlands) SC Heerenveen	Utrecht, Netherlands
21:00 CEST (UTC+2)	Warmerdam 7'; Gustafson 23'; Dalmau 36'; Kerk 84'	Report	Hajal 45'	Stadium: Stadion Galgenwaard; Attendance: 2,805; Referee: Bas Nijhuis

29 August 2020 Friendly	VfL Osnabrück (Germany)	2–0	(Netherlands) SC Heerenveen	Osnabrück, Germany
17:00 CEST (UTC+2)				Stadium: Stadion an der Bremer Brücke

5 September 2020 Friendly	SC Heerenveen (Netherlands)	0–1	(Netherlands) PEC Zwolle	Heerenveen, Netherlands
14:00 CEST (UTC+2)		Report	Akujobi 14' (o.g.)	Stadium: Abe Lenstra Stadion; Attendance: 1,500; Referee: Björn Kuipers

== Competitions ==
=== Overview ===
Competition	First match	Last match	Starting round	Final position	Record							
Competition	First match	Last match	Starting round	Final position	Pld	W	D	L	GF	GA	GD	Win %
Eredivisie	12 September 2020	16 May 2021	Matchday 1	12th	34	9	12	13	43	49	−6	26.47
KNVB Cup	27 October 2020	3 March 2021	First round	Semi-finals	4	3	0	1	9	8	+1	75.00
Total					38	12	12	14	52	57	−5	31.58

Last updated: 16 May 2021
Source: Soccerway

=== Eredivisie ===
==== League table ====
Pos	Team	Pld	W	D	L	GF	GA	GD	Pts
10	Twente	34	10	11	13	48	50	−2	41
11	Fortuna Sittard	34	12	5	17	50	58	−8	41
12	Heerenveen	34	9	12	13	43	49	−6	39
13	PEC Zwolle	34	9	11	14	44	53	−9	38
14	Willem II	34	8	7	19	40	68	−28	31

Source: Eredivisie, Soccerway
Rules for classification: Season in progress: 1) Most points won; 2) Less points lost; 3) Goal difference; 4) Goals scored; 5) Alphabetical order; End of season: 1) Points; 2) Goal difference; 3) Goals scored; 4) Head-to-head points; 5) Head-to-head goal difference; 6) Head-to-head away goals scored; 7) Play-off if relevant for deciding champion, relegation or participating in a European league, otherwise by draw. 8) Penalty shoot-out (only after a play-off)

==== Results summary ====
Overall								Home						Away					
Pld	W	D	L	GF	GA	GD	Pts	W	D	L	GF	GA	GD	W	D	L	GF	GA	GD
34	9	12	13	43	49	−6	39	6	5	6	22	18	+4	3	7	7	21	31	−10

Last updated: 16 May 2021.
Source: Eredivisie

==== Results by round ====
Round	1	2	3	4	5	6	7	8	9	10	11	12	13	14	15	16	17	18	19	20	21	22	23	24	25	26	27	28	29	30	31	32	33	34
Ground	H	A	H	A	A	H	A	H	A	A	H	A	H	A	H	H	A	A	H	A	H	A	H	A	H	A	H	H	A	H	A	H	A	H
Result	W	W	W	D	L	W	W	L	D	D	D	D	L	L	L	D	D	L	W	D	W	L	D	L	W	L	D	L	W	L	D	D	L	L
Position	4	1	1	3	6	6	6	6	6	6	7	8	8	8	8	9	8	9	9	9	9	9	10	10	10	11	10	10	10	10	11	11	11	12

Updated to match(es) played on 16 May 2021. Source: Eredivisie
A = Away; H = Home; W = Win; D = Draw; L = Loss

==== Matches ====
The league fixtures were announced on 24 July 2020.

12 September 2020 1	SC Heerenveen	2–0	Willem II	Heerenveen
18:45 CEST (UTC+2)	Batista Meier (yellow card) 17'; Woudenberg 22'; Van der Heide (yellow card) 68'; Bochniewicz 75'	Report	Llonch (yellow card) 19'; Nelom (yellow card) 32'; Sağlam (yellow card) 44'	Stadium: Abe Lenstra Stadion; Attendance: 4,000; Referee: Richard Martens

19 September 2020 2	Fortuna Sittard	1–3	SC Heerenveen	Sittard
21:00 CEST (UTC+2)	Janssen (yellow card) 62'; Niňaj (yellow card) 69'; Rota (yellow card) 72'; Polter 73'; Flemming (yellow card) 87'	Report	Batista Meier 15'; J. Veerman 29' (pen.); H. Veerman 34'	Stadium: Fortuna Sittard Stadion; Attendance: 2,825; Referee: Martín Pérez

26 September 2020 3	SC Heerenveen	1–0	VVV-Venlo	Heerenveen
20:00 CEST (UTC+2)	J. Veerman 32' (pen.); Floranus (yellow card) 57'	Report	Van Crooij (yellow card) 62'; Pachonik (red card) 63'; Janssen (red card) 79'	Stadium: Abe Lenstra Stadion; Attendance: 6,500; Referee: Kevin Blom

2 October 2020 4	FC Utrecht	1–1	SC Heerenveen	Utrecht
20:00 CEST (UTC+2)	Kerk 44'; Van de Streek (yellow card) 48'	Report	H. Veerman 4'; Smit (yellow card) 77', (red card) 83'	Stadium: Stadion Galgenwaard; Attendance: 0 Referee: Pol van Boekel

18 October 2020 5	Ajax	5–1	SC Heerenveen	Amsterdam
14:30 CEST (UTC+2)	Tadić 4', 28'; Kudus 35'; Klaassen 72'; Martínez (yellow card) 84'; Antony 87'	Report	H. Veerman 66'; Kongolo (yellow card) 71'; Van Hecke (yellow card) 74'	Stadium: Johan Cruyff Arena; Attendance: 0 Referee: Björn Kuipers

24 October 2020 6	SC Heerenveen	4–0	FC Emmen	Heerenveen
21:00 CEST (UTC+2)	Van Hecke (yellow card) 3'; H. Veerman 26', 74'; Nygren 29'; Kongolo 71'; Dewaele (yellow card) 84'	Report	Tibbling (yellow card) 47' (yellow-red card) 52'; De Leeuw (yellow card) 52'; Laursen (red card) 77'	Stadium: Abe Lenstra Stadion; Attendance: 0 Referee: Sander van der Eijk

1 November 2020 7	Sparta Rotterdam	1–4	SC Heerenveen	Rotterdam
14:30 CET (UTC+1)	Duarte (yellow card) 50'; Thy 90+3' (pen.)	Report	Nygren 7'; Van Hecke 25'; H. Veerman 42', 57'	Stadium: Het Kasteel; Attendance: 0 Referee: Bas Nijhuis

8 November 2020 8	SC Heerenveen	0–3	AZ	Heerenveen
16:45 CET (UTC+1)	Van Hecke (yellow card) 28'	Report	Koopmeiners 29'; Woudenberg 41'; Karlsson 47'	Stadium: Abe Lenstra Stadion; Attendance: 0 Referee: Dennis Higler

22 November 2020 9	RKC Waalwijk	1–1	SC Heerenveen	Waalwijk
16:45 CET (UTC+1)	Anita (yellow card) 50'; Damașcan 82'	Report	H. Veerman 19', (yellow card) 44'; Dewaele (red card) 43'; Woudenberg (yellow card) 84'; Floranus (yellow card) 90+1'; Kongolo (yellow card) 90+5'; Mulder (yellow card) 90+6'	Stadium: Mandemakers Stadion; Attendance: 0 Referee: Christiaan Bax

28 November 2020 10	ADO Den Haag	1–1	SC Heerenveen	The Hague
20:00 CET (UTC+1)	Philipp 13'	Report	J. Veerman 16'; H. Veerman (yellow card) 28'	Stadium: Cars Jeans Stadion; Attendance: 0 Referee: Danny Makkelie

6 December 2020 11	SC Heerenveen	2–2	PSV	Heerenveen
16:45 CET (UTC+1)	H. Veerman 69'; Van Bergen 78'	Report	Rosario (yellow card) 13'; Götze 28'; Piroe 90+2'; Dumfries (yellow card) 90+3'	Stadium: Abe Lenstra Stadion; Attendance: 0 Referee: Bas Nijhuis

13 December 2020 12	Vitesse	1–1	SC Heerenveen	Arnhem
12:15 CET (UTC+1)	Darfalou 39'; Wittek (yellow card) 68'; Bazoer (yellow card) 87'	Report	Floranus 54', (yellow card) 90+1'; Woudenberg (yellow card) 58'	Stadium: GelreDome; Attendance: 0 Referee: Allard Lindhout

20 December 2020 13	SC Heerenveen	1–2	Heracles Almelo	Heerenveen
14:30 CET (UTC+1)	J. Veerman 57'; Bochniewicz (red card) 88'	Report	Burgzorg 6'; Knoester 48'	Stadium: Abe Lenstra Stadion; Attendance: 0 Referee: Martin Pérez

23 December 2020 14	Feyenoord	3–0	SC Heerenveen	Rotterdam
21:00 CET (UTC+1)	Linssen 48', 58', 90+1'	Report		Stadium: De Kuip; Attendance: 0 Referee: Jochem Kamphuis

10 January 2021 15	SC Heerenveen	1–3	Fortuna Sittard	Heerenveen
14:30 CET (UTC+1)	H. Veerman 72'	Report	Rienstra 20'; Cox 24'; Flemming 37'	Stadium: Abe Lenstra Stadion; Attendance: 0 Referee: Richard Martens

14 January 2021 16	SC Heerenveen	1–1	RKC Waalwijk	Heerenveen
18:45 CET (UTC+1)	H. Veerman 7'	Report	Van der Venne 56'	Stadium: Abe Lenstra Stadion; Attendance: 0 Referee: Martin van den Kerkhof

17 January 2021 17	VVV-Venlo	1–1	SC Heerenveen	Venlo
14:30 CET (UTC+1)	Post (yellow card) 46'; John 78'; Da Graca (yellow card) 90+3'	Report	J. Veerman (yellow card) 17'; Nygren 89'	Stadium: De Koel; Attendance: 0 Referee: Erwin Blank

23 January 2021 18	Heracles Almelo	1–0	SC Heerenveen	Almelo
21:00 CET (UTC+1)	Quagliata (yellow card) 71'; Burgzorg 89'	Report	Kaib (yellow card) 85'	Stadium: Erve Asito; Attendance: 0 Referee: Jochem Kamphuis

27 January 2021 19	SC Heerenveen	3–0	Feyenoord	Heerenveen
21:00 CET (UTC+1)	J. Veerman 28'; Bochniewicz 30'; H. Veerman (yellow card) 31'; Van Bergen 50'	Report	Toornstra (yellow card) 49'	Stadium: Abe Lenstra Stadion; Attendance: 0 Referee: Pol van Boekel

31 January 2021 20	FC Twente	0–0	SC Heerenveen	Enschede
12:15 CET (UTC+1)	Roemeratoe (yellow card) 33'; Menig (yellow card) 88'	Report	Kongolo (yellow card) 90+2'	Stadium: De Grolsch Veste; Attendance: 0 Referee: Jeroen Manschot

6 February 2021 21	SC Heerenveen	1–0	Vitesse	Heerenveen
21:00 CET (UTC+1)	J. Veerman (penalty missed) 30'; H. Veerman 83'	Report	Tronstad (yellow card) 73'	Stadium: Abe Lenstra Stadion; Attendance: 0 Referee: Bas Nijhuis

14 February 2021 22	AZ	3–1	SC Heerenveen	Alkmaar
12:15 CET (UTC+1)	Stengs 20'; Koopmeiners 47' (pen.); Chatzidiakos (yellow card) 60'; Guðmundsson 81'	Report	Van Hecke (yellow card) 46'; Schöne 54'; Kongolo (yellow card) 87'	Stadium: AFAS Stadion; Attendance: 0 Referee: Danny Makkelie

21 February 2021 23	SC Heerenveen	1–1	FC Groningen	Heerenveen
14:30 CET (UTC+1)	De Jong 43'	Report	Suslov 82'	Stadium: Abe Lenstra Stadion; Attendance: 0 Referee: Kevin Blom

26 February 2021 24	PEC Zwolle	4–1	SC Heerenveen	Zwolle
20:00 CET (UTC+1)	Misidjan 52'; Buitink 70'; Huiberts (yellow card) 77'; Van Polen 89'; Reijnders 90+2'	Report	Van Bergen 27'; J. Veerman (yellow card) 83'; De Jong (yellow card) 83'	Stadium: MAC³PARK Stadion; Attendance: 0 Referee: Laurens Gerrets

6 March 2021 25	SC Heerenveen	3–0	ADO Den Haag	Heerenveen
20:00 CET (UTC+1)	De Jong 8'; Bochniewicz (yellow card) 44'; Van Bergen (yellow card) 67'; H. Veerman 78'; J. Veerman 89'	Report	Arweiler (yellow card) 90+2'	Stadium: Abe Lenstra Stadion; Attendance: 0 Referee: Björn Kuipers

13 March 2021 26	Willem II	3–1	SC Heerenveen	Tilburg
16:30 CET (UTC+1)	Holmén 28'; Wriedt 55'; Nunnely 58'	Report	J. Veerman (yellow card) 59', (goal) 73'	Stadium: Koning Willem II Stadion; Attendance: 0 Referee: Jeroen Manschot

19 March 2021 27	SC Heerenveen	0–0	FC Twente	Heerenveen
20:00 CET (UTC+1)	Bochniewicz (yellow card) 71'	Report	Markelo (yellow card) 90'	Stadium: Abe Lenstra Stadion; Attendance: 0 Referee: Martin van den Kerkhof

4 April 2021 28	SC Heerenveen	1–2	Ajax	Heerenveen
16:45 CEST (UTC+2)	Van Bergen 27'	Report	Tadić 36' (pen.); Haller 61'; Tagliafico (yellow card) 86'	Stadium: Abe Lenstra Stadion; Attendance: 0 Referee: Jochem Kamphuis

11 April 2021 29	FC Groningen	0–2	SC Heerenveen	Groningen
14:30 CEST (UTC+2)	Te Wierik (yellow card) 42'	Report	H. Veerman 71' (pen.); Halilović 86'	Stadium: Euroborg; Attendance: 0 Referee: Dennis Higler

24 April 2021 30	SC Heerenveen	0–2	PEC Zwolle	Heerenveen
16:30 CEST (UTC+2)	De Jong (yellow card) 79'	Report	Van Polen (yellow card) 18', (goal) 68'; Clement 28'; Paal (yellow card) 56'	Stadium: Abe Lenstra Stadion; Attendance: 2,000; Referee: Rob Dieperink

2 May 2021 31	PSV	2–2	SC Heerenveen	Eindhoven
16:45 CEST (UTC+2)	Viergever (yellow card) 38'; Vertessen 57'; Gakpo 58', (yellow card) 87'	Report	Kongolo (yellow card) 22'; Halilović 34'; De Jong 59'; Smit (yellow card) 90+4'; Floranus (yellow card) 90+6'	Stadium: Philips Stadion; Attendance: 0 Referee: Allard Lindhout

8 May 2021 32	SC Heerenveen	0–0	FC Utrecht	Heerenveen
18:45 CEST (UTC+2)	Nygren (yellow card) 84'	Report		Stadium: Abe Lenstra Stadion; Attendance: 0 Referee: Pol van Boekel

13 May 2021 33	FC Emmen	3–1	SC Heerenveen	Emmen
14:30 CEST (UTC+2)	Peña 21' (pen.), 53' (pen.); Laursen 82'	Report	Schöne (red card) 27'; Van Hecke (yellow card) 52'; De Jong (yellow card) 76'; Nygren 88'; Van Ottele (red card) 90+2'	Stadium: De Oude Meerdijk; Attendance: 0 Referee: Bas Nijhuis

16 May 2021 34	SC Heerenveen	1–2	Sparta Rotterdam	Heerenveen
14:30 CEST (UTC+2)	De Jong 67'; Akujobi (yellow card) 84'	Report	Thy 7'; Burger 16'; Smeets (yellow card) 30'	Stadium: Abe Lenstra Stadion; Attendance: 0 Referee: Jeroen Manschot

=== KNVB Cup ===
27 October 2020 First round	SC Heerenveen	3–1	TOP Oss	Heerenveen
19:45 CET	Veerman 11'; Nygren 33'; Kongolo 40'	Report	Sanches 29'	Stadium: Abe Lenstra Stadion; Attendance: 0 Referee: Edgar Bijl

20 January 2021 Round of 16	FC Emmen	1–2	SC Heerenveen	Emmen
16:30 CET (UTC+1)	Peña 44'	Report	Nygren 72'; J. Veerman 90' (pen.)	Stadium: De Oude Meerdijk; Attendance: 0 Referee: Siemen Mulder

17 February 2021 Quarter-finals	SC Heerenveen	4–3	Feyenoord	Heerenveen
18:45 CET (UTC+1)	Kaib 15'; J. Veerman (penalty missed) 53', (yellow card) 60'; Nygren 81'; Marsman 86' (o.g.); De Jong 88'	Report	Berghuis (yellow card) 27' (yellow-red card) 66', (goal) 57'; Linssen 47', (yellow card) 65'; Geertruida 61'; Haps (yellow card) 82'; Fer (yellow card) 84'	Stadium: Abe Lenstra Stadion; Attendance: 0 Referee: Siemen Mulder
Note: The match was originally scheduled to be held on 11 February 2021, 20:00 CET, but was postponed due to the pitch being frozen.

3 March 2021 Semi-finals	SC Heerenveen	0–3	Ajax	Heerenveen
21:00 CET (UTC+1)		Report	Klaassen 19'; Tadić 63' (pen.); Neres 77'	Stadium: Abe Lenstra Stadion; Attendance: 0 Referee: Bas Nijhuis
