= Freek Schipper =

Dutch footballer

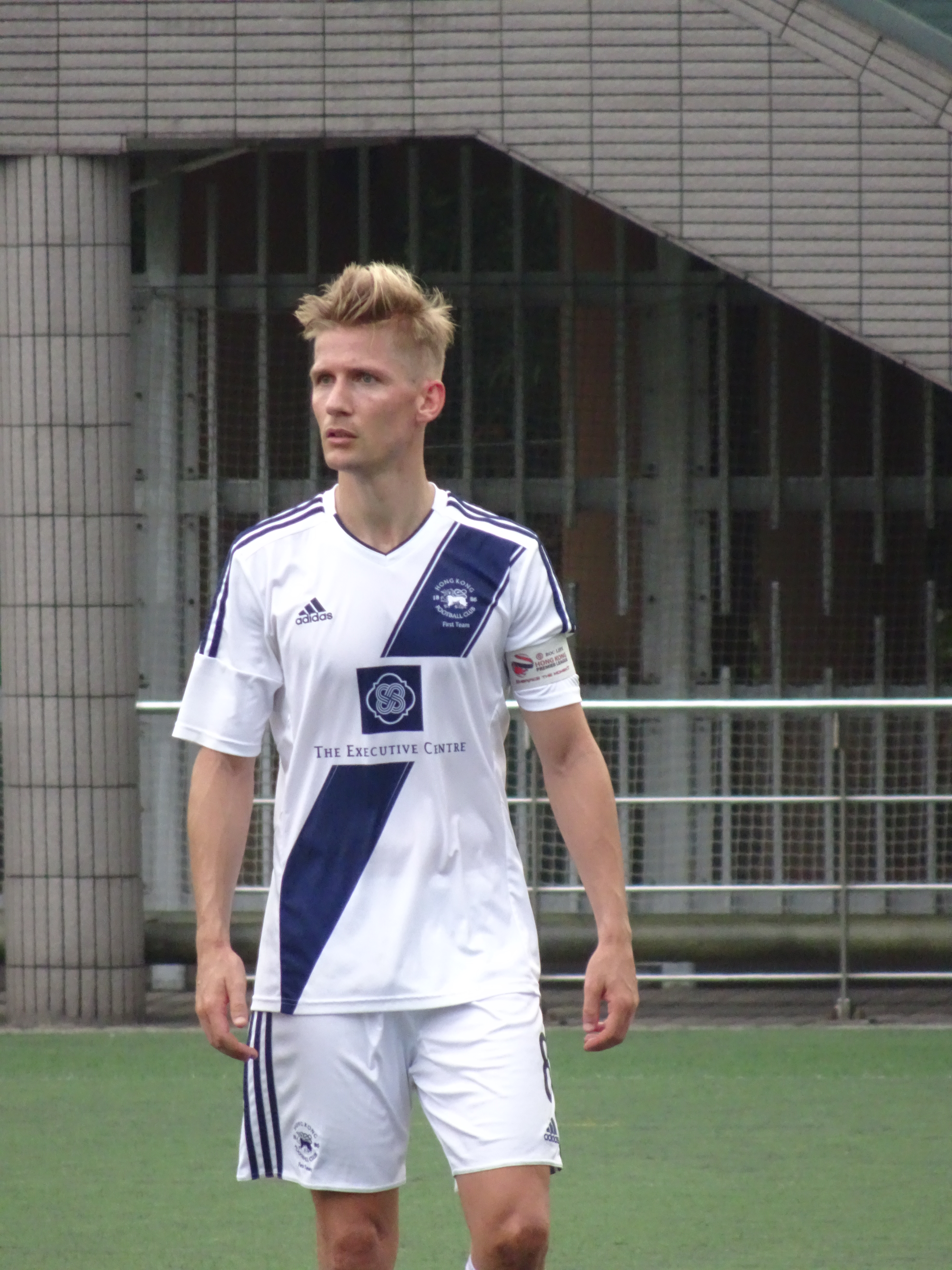
- Schipper with HKFC in 2018

Personal information
- Full name: Frederik Pieter Schipper
- Date of birth: 25 October 1983 (age 43)
- Place of birth: Netherlands
- Height: 1.82 m (6 ft 0 in)
- Position: Defensive midfielder

Youth career
- 1990–2001: Sparta Rotterdam

Senior career*
Years	Team	Apps	(Gls)
2006–2008	DVVA Amsterdam		
2008–2023	HKFC	281	(45)
- * Club domestic league appearances and goals as of 7 May 2023

Frederik Pieter "Freek" Schipper (born 25 October 1983) is a former Dutch professional footballer who played as a defensive midfielder.

== Club career ==
=== HKFC ===
Freek played for DVVA Amsterdam from 2006 until 2008 and also had a short stint with Mutual FC in Hong Kong. In July 2008, Freek joined HKFC.

On 4 September 2022, Freek made his 250th league appearance for the club in a 1–0 victory over Sham Shui Po.

On 7 May 2023, Freek announced his retirement from professional football aged 39 following a 2–1 victory over Southern, marking an end to a 15-year stay at HKFC.
