= James Efmorfidis =

Greek footballer

Personal information
- Date of birth: 18 January 1996 (age 30)
- Place of birth: Athens, Greece
- Height: 1.78 m (5 ft 10 in)
- Position: Attacking midfielder

Team information
- Current team: CSV DVVA

Youth career
- 2001–2003: Enosi Erythreas
- 2003–2006: Ajax
- 2006–2007: Real Madrid
- 2007–2008: AEK Athens
- 2008–2011: Barcelona
- 2011–2015: Ajax
- 2015–2016: AZ

Senior career*
Years	Team	Apps	(Gls)
2015–2017	Jong AZ	26	(3)
2017	AEL	2	(0)
2017–2018	Jong Almere City	17	(4)
2018–2020	Almere City	50	(13)
2020–2021	RKC Waalwijk	7	(0)
2021–2022	AO Nileas Neochoriou		
2022–	DVVA		

International career
2013	Greece U17	1	(0)
- * Club domestic league appearances and goals as of 22 November 2024

James Efmorfidis (Greek: Τζέιμς Ευμορφίδης; born 18 January 1996) is a Greek professional footballer who plays as a midfielder for CSV DVVA.

== Career ==
Efmorfidis played in the youth academies of Enosi Erythreas, Ajax, Real Madrid, AEK Athens, Barcelona and again Ajax. In 2015, he joined AZ, where he mainly played in the reserve team, Jong AZ. He was once on the bench with AZ's first team, in the 3–0 away loss to PSV. With Jong AZ, he became champion of the Tweede Divisie in the 2016–17 season, but Efmorfidis left halfway through the season for the Greek club AEL. There, he made two appearances in the Super League Greece, but he soon returned to The Netherlands. He briefly joined practice at Hoofdklasse club SDO Bussum, and when SDO head coach Ivar van Dinteren combined the position with coaching at Jong Almere City, the reserve team of Almere City, Efmorfidis followed him. In the 2017–18 season, he played for Jong Almere City in the Derde Divisie Saturday. In January 2018, Efmorfidis signed a permanent contract with Almere City FC until 2020. When the contract expired, he moved to Eredivisie club RKC Waalwijk. On 3 August 2021, he announced his retirement from professional football.

== Career statistics ==
As of match played 23 January 2021

Appearances and goals by club, season and competition
Club	Season	League			Cup		Other (Note: Includes Eredivisie promotion play-offs)		Total	
Club	Season	Division	Apps	Goals	Apps	Goals	Apps	Goals	Apps	Goals
Jong AZ	2015–16	Beloften Eredivisie	19	2	—				19	2
Jong AZ	2016–17	Tweede Divisie	7	1	—				7	1
Jong AZ	Total		26	3	—				26	3
AEL	2016–17	Super League Greece	2	0	0	0	—		2	0
AEL	Total		2	0	0	0	—		2	0
Jong Almere City	2017–18	Derde Divisie	16	4	—				16	4
Jong Almere City	2018–19	Tweede Divisie	1	0	—				1	0
Jong Almere City	Total		17	4	—				17	4
Almere City	2018–19	Eerste Divisie	35	9	1	0	2	0	38	9
Almere City	2019–20	Eerste Divisie	15	4	1	1	0	0	16	5
Almere City	Total		50	13	2	1	2	0	54	14
RKC Waalwijk	2020–21	Eredivisie	7	0	0	0	—		7	0
RKC Waalwijk	Total		7	0	0	0	—		7	0
Career total			102	21	2	1	2	0	106	22
