= Rein Smit =

Dutch footballer (born 2001)

Personal information
- Date of birth: 5 January 2001 (age 25)
- Place of birth: Castricum, Netherlands
- Height: 1.89 m (6 ft 2 in)
- Position: Forward

Youth career
- 2006–2012: FC Castricum
- 2012–2014: ADO '20
- 2014–2019: Heerenveen

Senior career*
Years	Team	Apps	(Gls)
2019–2021	Heerenveen	6	(0)
2021–2023	Telstar	40	(10)
2024	Sligo Rovers	11	(0)
- * Club domestic league appearances and goals as of 29 May 2024

Rein Smit (born 5 January 2001) is a Dutch professional footballer who plays as a forward.

== Career ==
=== Heerenveen ===
Smit played youth football for amateur clubs FC Castricum and ADO '20. In 2014, he was scouted to the youth academy of SC Heerenveen. He made his professional debut in the first team on 21 December 2019 in a 1–1 draw at home against Heracles Almelo. He came on as a substitute for Anders Dreyer in the 79th minute.

=== Telstar ===
On 20 July 2021, Smit signed with Eerste Divisie club Telstar. That same evening he made his unofficial debut against Quick Boys in pre-season. He also scored his first goal in the 63rd minute in that match. He made his official debut on 6 August in a 1–1 draw against FC Emmen at home at BUKO Stadion. On 10 September, Smit scored his first goal in the 72nd minute of the league match against Almere City and thereby secured a 1–1 draw after having come on as a substitute for Cas Dijkstra in the 58th minute.

On 24 January 2023, Smit made his first start of the season, and scored his first professional hat-trick, strongly contributing to Telstar's 5–3 league victory against MVV.

=== Sligo Rovers ===
On 15 March 2024, Smit signed for League of Ireland Premier Division side Sligo Rovers after spending time on trial and impressing manager John Russell. He made his debut for the club the following day, replacing Connor Malley in the 78th minute of a 3–1 league win over Drogheda United. He made 11 appearances for the club before it was announced on 29 May that he had left the club by mutual consent due to personal issues.

== Career statistics ==
As of match played 24 May 2024

Appearances and goals by club, season and competition
Club	Season	League			National Cup		League Cup		Other		Total	
Club	Season	Division	Apps	Goals	Apps	Goals	Apps	Goals	Apps	Goals	Apps	Goals
Heerenveen	2019–20	Eredivisie	1	0	0	0	—		—		1	0
Heerenveen	2020–21	Eredivisie	5	0	0	0	—		—		5	0
Heerenveen	Total		6	0	0	0	—		—		6	0
Telstar	2021–22	Eerste Divisie	25	7	3	0	—		—		28	7
Telstar	2022–23	Eerste Divisie	15	3	1	0	—		—		16	3
Telstar	Total		40	10	4	0	—		—		44	10
Sligo Rovers	2024	LOI Premier Division	11	0	—		—		—		11	0
Career total			57	10	4	0	0	0	0	0	61	10
