= Özgür Aktaş =

Dutch footballer (born 1997)

Personal information
- Date of birth: 27 January 1997 (age 29)
- Place of birth: Cuijk, Netherlands
- Height: 1.90 m (6 ft 3 in)
- Position: Centre-back

Team information
- Current team: Ankaragücü
- Number: 24

Youth career
- –2012: JVC Cuijk
- 2012–2015: Vitesse
- 2015–2018: NEC

Senior career*
Years	Team	Apps	(Gls)
2018–2019	Jong Vitesse	28	(4)
2019–2020	Vitesse	0	(0)
2020–2021	Fortuna Sittard	0	(0)
2020–2021	→ Dordrecht (loan)	34	(2)
2021–2023	Telstar	70	(5)
2023–2025	MVV	59	(2)
2025–	Ankaragücü	23	(1)
- * Club domestic league appearances and goals as of 12:39, 14 August 2026 (UTC)

Özgür Aktaş (born 27 January 1997) is a Dutch professional footballer who plays as a centre-back for Turkish TFF 2. Lig club Ankaragücü.

== Club career ==
=== Vitesse ===
Born in Cuijk, Aktaş started his career at local club JVC Cuijk and joined the youth academy of Vitesse in 2012. In 2015, he moved to the youth academy of NEC. In March 2017, Aktaş, together with Lars Kramer, was promoted to the first team by head coach Peter Hyballa due to injuries on their position. On 5 April 2017, he sat on the bench once during the away match in the Eredivisie against FC Groningen, but did not make an appearance. In the 2017–18 season, Aktaş again played for the second team, Jong NEC, in the Beloften Eredivisie.

In 2018, Aktaş returned to Vitesse where he joined their second team, Jong Vitesse, who competed in the Tweede Divisie. He made 28 appearances in which he scored 4 goals. At the end of the 2018–19 season, he was brought into the first-team squad and sat on the bench twice during the play-offs. The 2019–20 season again saw Aktaş play for Jong Vitesse, now playing in the Beloften Competitie. At the beginning of September, a transfer to FC Den Bosch did not materialise and later that month, Aktaş, together with Patrick Vroegh, were promoted to the Vitesse first team by head coach Leonid Slutsky. Under caretaker manager Joseph Oosting, Aktaş made his professional debut for Vitesse on 17 December 2019 in the KNVB Cup home matchup against ODIN '59 in which he replaced Danilho Doekhi after 85 minutes. His contract expired in the summer of 2020, making him a free agent.

=== Fortuna Sittard and Dordrecht ===
In August 2020, Aktaş was signed by Fortuna Sittard, who sent him directly on a season-long loan to Eerste Divisie club FC Dordrecht. After returning from his loan, his contract was not renewed, making him a free agent.

=== Telstar ===
In August 2021, Aktaş signed with SC Telstar. He made his official debut on 13 August in a 2–2 draw against NAC Breda, coming on as a substitute for Jip Molenaar in the 75th minute. On 17 September, he scored his first goal for Telstar, which proved to be the match-winner in the 1–0 away win over his former club Dordrecht.

=== MVV ===
On 14 July 2023, Aktaş joined Eerste Divisie club MVV on a two-year contract. He made his debut for the Sterrendragers on the first matchday of the season, starting in a 3–1 win over VVV-Venlo. On 6 November, he scored his first goal for the club, opening the score by heading in a Tunahan Taşçı corner-kick in a 1–1 league draw against Emmen.

== International career ==
He is available to represent for either the Netherlands or Turkey, being born in the Netherlands and is of Turkish descent.

== Career statistics ==
As of match played 17 December 2024

Appearances and goals by club, season and competition
Club	Season	League			KNVB Cup		Other		Total	
Club	Season	Division	Apps	Goals	Apps	Goals	Apps	Goals	Apps	Goals
Jong Vitesse	2018–19	Tweede Divisie	28	4	—		—		28	4
Vitesse	2019–20	Eredivisie	0	0	1	0	—		1	0
Fortuna Sittard	2020–21	Eredivisie	0	0	0	0	—		0	0
Dordrecht (loan)	2020–21	Eerste Divisie	34	2	0	0	—		34	2
Telstar	2021–22	Eerste Divisie	36	5	3	1	—		39	6
Telstar	2022–23	Eerste Divisie	34	0	2	0	—		36	0
Telstar	Total		70	5	5	1	—		75	6
MVV	2023–24	Eerste Divisie	37	2	1	0	—		38	2
MVV	2023–24	Eerste Divisie	18	0	2	1	—		20	1
MVV	Total		55	2	3	1	—		58	3
Career total			187	13	9	2	0	0	196	15
