= Nicky van Hilten =

Dutch footballer

Personal information
- Date of birth: 22 February 1997 (age 29)
- Place of birth: Amsterdam, Netherlands
- Position: Right-back

Team information
- Current team: DVS '33
- Number: 2

Youth career
- –2018: Almere City

Senior career*
Years	Team	Apps	(Gls)
2016–2020	Jong Almere City	84	(13)
2018–2020	Almere City	14	(1)
2020–	DVS '33	136	(20)
- * Club domestic league appearances and goals as of 16 December 2025

Nicky van Hilten (born 22 February 1997) is a Dutch football player. He plays as a right-back for amateur side DVS '33.

== Club career ==
Van Hilten made his Eerste Divisie debut for Almere City on 2 April 2018 in a game against RKC Waalwijk, as a starter. In December 2025, he extended his contract with DVS '33 with another 3,5 years.
