= DVVA Amsterdam =

DVVA
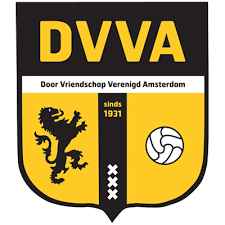
- Full name: Door Vriendschap Verenigd Amsterdam (United By Friendship Amsterdam)
- Nickname: The Yellow-Black Lions (De Geelzwarte Leeuwen)
- Founded: 25 March 1931; 95 years ago
- Ground: Sportpark Drieburg, Amsterdam, Netherlands
- Chairman: Mark van den Hoek
- Manager: Bnar Tofeek
- League: Vierde Divisie (2026/2027)
- 2025-2026: 12th of 16
- Website: www.dvva.nl
Home colours	Away colours

DVVA (Door Vriendschap Verenigd Amsterdam) is a Dutch amateur football club from Amsterdam, founded in 1931. DVVA competes in the Vierde Divisie (2026/27 season). The club colors are yellow and black.

DVVA plays at Sportpark Drieburg in Amsterdam East. The club has approximately 500 members and comprises 14 men's teams, 4 women's teams, and 7 men's indoor teams. The nickname of DVVA members is: The Yellow-Black Lions.

The first team became champions of the Saturday Tweede Klasse in the 2010/2011 season. After a season in the Eerste Klasse, DVVA has been playing in the Tweede Klasse again since the 2012/2013 season.

DVVA is also known for the annual SoccerRocker festival and the Jaap Heesen Tournament.

== Players ==
As of 16 March 2026. Note: Flags indicate national team as defined under FIFA eligibility rules; some limited exceptions apply. Players may hold more than one non-FIFA nationality.

No.	Pos.	Nation	Player
—		NED	Dave Severins
—		NED	Friso Kaashoek
—		NED	Gijs Oostermeijer
—	MF	NED	Guido de Graaf
—	DF	NED	Guido Moelee
—	MF	GRE	James Efmorfidis
—		NED	Jari van der Meer
—	GK	RUS	Michal Vojtech
—		NED	Jim Schiks
—	DF	NED	Jip Molenaar

No.	Pos.	Nation	Player
—	DF	NED	Jouke Spanninga
—		NED	Julian Laan
—	MF	NED	Kiet Scholten
—	DF	NED	Lezil da Silva
—	FW	NED	Lennart Bril
—	GK	NED	Lode van Hattum
—		NED	Maxim de Swaan
—	DF	NED	Moiz da Silva
—		NED	Pierre de Wit
—		NED	Sander Fillet
—		NED	Sven van Es
—	DF	NED	Ties Bos
—		NED	Wiecher van Helbergen
