= Tom Overtoom =

Dutch footballer (born 1990)

Personal information
- Full name: Thomas Overtoom
- Date of birth: 20 November 1990 (age 35)
- Place of birth: Amsterdam, Netherlands
- Height: 1.73 m (5 ft 8 in)
- Position: Midfielder

Team information
- Current team: Rijnsburgse Boys

Youth career
- 1997–1998: SV de Meer
- 1998–1999: SV Diemen
- 1999–2011: Ajax

Senior career*
Years	Team	Apps	(Gls)
2009–2011	Ajax	0	(0)
2009	→ Haarlem (loan)	12	(0)
2011–2012	Sparta Rotterdam	15	(2)
2012–2013	Veendam	26	(6)
2013–2015	Volendam	54	(9)
2015–2016	Excelsior	2	(0)
2016	→ Emmen (loan)	9	(0)
2016–2018	Almere City	50	(11)
2018–2020	NEC	30	(1)
2020–2025	Telstar	108	(5)
2025–	Rijnsburgse Boys	5	(0)
- * Club domestic league appearances and goals as of 09:17, 22 May 2026 (UTC)

Thomas Overtoom (Dutch pronunciation: [ˈtoːmɑs ˈtɔm ˈoːvərtoːm]; born 20 November 1990) is a Dutch professional footballer who plays as a midfielder for Tweede Divisie club Rijnsburgse Boys.

== Career ==
=== Ajax ===
Overtoom grew up in the neighbourhood of Watergraafsmeer, Amsterdam, and started his football career in 1998 for SV de Meer, before moving to SV Diemen the following year. He only stayed their for another year, before joining the youth academy of Ajax. During his years in the academy, he was chosen multiple times as the best player, such as at the 2002 Danone Nations Cup in France.

In July 2009, Overtoom was sent on a one-season loan to Haarlem, who were then competing in the Eerste Divisie. During his time at Haarlem, Overtoom made 13 appearances for the first team, including his professional debut on 11 September 2009, in a 4–1 home loss to Helmond Sport. However, on 22 January 2010, he requested to return to Ajax before Haarlem faced bankruptcy. Towards the end of January 2011, Overtoom was included in the matchday squad for the away game against NAC Breda. He had been assigned the jersey number 52 for the 2010–11 season. Despite being part of the first team's match selection once, he failed to make an appearance. In 2011, Ajax made the decision not to extend his expiring contract, and he departed the club as a free agent.

=== Sparta Rotterdam ===
On 21 June 2011, Overtoom signed a two-year contract with Eerste Divisie club Sparta Rotterdam. He scored two goals in 15 appearances during his only season at the club, before deciding to terminate his contract by mutual consent.

=== Veendam ===
On 1 August 2012, he signed a two-year contract with Veendam. Due to the bankruptcy of the club in March 2013, as it later turned out, he would score the last professional goal in the club's history during the match against FC Oss on 15 March 2013, which they won 2–1. After that, he maintained his fitness at Groningen, attracting interest from various domestic and foreign clubs.

=== Volendam ===
In June 2013, Overtoom joined Volendam on a two-year deal. He made his debut for the club on 3 August 2013, the first matchday of the season, starting and providing an assist in a 3–2 away victory against Almere City, in which Robert Mühren scored a hat-trick. In his first season, he was named Player of the Year. However, in his second year at the club, he played less than half of the matches due to a hip injury. On 1 July 2015, he became a free agent as he chose not to renew his contract with Volendam.

=== Excelsior ===
In July 2015, Overtoom signed a one-year contract with Excelsior, with an option for an additional season. After making only four appearances during six months at the club, he was sent on loan to Emmen in January 2016.

=== Almere City and NEC ===
In July 2016, he signed a two-year contract with Almere City. In the summer of 2018, he followed his coach Jack de Gier to NEC, where he signed a three-year contract. On 17 August, he made his debut for the club in a home game against Cambuur. On 4 November, he scored his first goal for NEC in a 3–1 home victory against Jong AZ. On 12 June 2020, his contract, which still had one year remaining, was terminated by NEC by mutual consent.

=== Telstar ===
On 19 November 2020, Overtoom signed with Telstar as a free agent following a successful trial period. He made his debut on 4 December, coming on as a late substitute in a 2–1 home defeat to Cambuur. Overtoom became a regular in the side and played a key role during the 2022–23 season, making 32 appearances—30 of them starts—as Telstar finished ninth, their best league finish since 2018 and second-best since 2005.

On 29 May 2024, he signed a one-year contract extension through June 2025. Over five seasons with the club, Overtoom made 116 appearances. In the 2024–25 season, he was part of the squad that earned promotion to the Eredivisie via the play-offs, defeating Willem II over two legs in the final.

=== Rijnsburgse Boys ===
On 16 May 2025, Overtoom joined Tweede Divisie side Rijnsburgse Boys ahead of the 2025–26 season.

== Career statistics ==
As of match played 27 September 2025

Appearances and goals by club, season and competition
Club	Season	League			KNVB Cup		Other		Total	
Club	Season	Division	Apps	Goals	Apps	Goals	Apps	Goals	Apps	Goals
Haarlem (loan)	2009–10	Eerste Divisie	12	0	1	0	—		13	0
Ajax	2010–11	Eredivisie	0	0	0	0	0	0	0	0
Sparta Rotterdam	2011–12	Eerste Divisie	15	2	2	0	0	0	17	2
Veendam	2012–13	Eerste Divisie	26	6	1	1	—		27	7
Volendam	2013–14	Eerste Divisie	37	7	1	0	—		38	7
Volendam	2014–15	Eerste Divisie	17	2	0	0	4 (Note: Appearances in Eredivisie promotion/relegation playoffs)	0	21	2
Volendam	Total		54	9	1	0	4	0	59	9
Excelsior	2015–16	Eredivisie	2	0	2	0	—		4	0
Emmen (loan)	2015–16	Eerste Divisie	9	0	—		2	0	11	0
Almere City	2016–17	Eerste Divisie	28	5	2	0	0	0	30	5
Almere City	2017–18	Eerste Divisie	22	6	0	0	5	0	27	6
Almere City	Total		50	11	2	0	5	0	57	11
NEC	2018–19	Eerste Divisie	25	1	2	0	0	0	27	1
NEC	2019–20	Eerste Divisie	5	0	1	0	—		6	0
NEC	Total		30	1	3	0	0	0	33	1
Telstar	2020–21	Eerste Divisie	13	0	0	0	—		13	0
Telstar	2021–22	Eerste Divisie	27	0	1	1	—		28	1
Telstar	2022–23	Eerste Divisie	31	3	1	0	—		32	3
Telstar	2023–24	Eerste Divisie	25	1	1	0	—		26	1
Telstar	2024–25	Eerste Divisie	12	1	1	0	4	0	17	1
Telstar	Total		108	5	4	1	4	0	116	6
Rijnsburgse Boys	2025–26	Tweede Divisie	5	0	0	0	—		5	0
Career total			311	34	16	2	15	0	339	36
