= Roman Tugarinov =

Russian football player (born 1999)

Personal information
- Full name: Roman Ruslanovich Tugarinov
- Date of birth: 20 October 1999 (age 27)
- Place of birth: Ulan-Ude, Russia
- Height: 1.87 m (6 ft 2 in)
- Position: Defender

Youth career
- 2009–2012: Barcelona
- 2012–2017: Cornellà
- 2017–2018: Barcelona

Senior career*
Years	Team	Apps	(Gls)
2018–2019	Barcelona B	0	(0)
2018–2019	→ Cornellà (loan)	19	(0)
2019–2022	Espanyol B	24	(0)
2021–2022	→ Telstar (loan)	12	(0)

International career
2018–2020	Russia U20	10	(0)
- * Club domestic league appearances and goals as of 1 January 2023

Roman Ruslanovich Tugarinov (Russian: Роман Русланович Тугаринов; born 20 October 1999) is a Russian professional footballer who plays as a defender.

== Club career ==
Tugarinov is a former youth academy player of Barcelona and Cornellà. He became the first Russian player to win UEFA Youth League when he won it with Barcelona in 2017–18 season. While on loan at Cornellà, he made his senior team debut on 28 October 2018 in a 1–1 draw against Sabadell. He joined Espanyol in July 2019.

In August 2021, Tugarinov joined Dutch club Telstar on a two-year loan deal with an option to buy. He made his professional debut for the club on 14 November 2021 in a 1–1 draw against De Graafschap.

== International career ==
Tugarinov is a former Russian youth international. He was part of Russian under-20 team which became runners-up at 2018 COTIF Tournament.

== Career statistics ==
As of match played 14 March 2022

Appearances and goals by club, season and competition
Club	Season	League			National Cup		Continental		Other		Total	
Club	Season	Division	Apps	Goals	Apps	Goals	Apps	Goals	Apps	Goals	Apps	Goals
Barcelona B	2018–19	Segunda División B	0	0	—		—		—		0	0
Cornellà (loan)	2018–19	Segunda División B	19	0	0	0	—		1 (Note: Appearance in Segunda División B play-offs)	0	20	0
Espanyol B	2019–20	Segunda División B	11	0	—		—		—		11	0
Espanyol B	2020–21	Segunda División B	16	0	—		—		—		16	0
Espanyol B	Total		27	0	0	0	0	0	0	0	27	0
Telstar (loan)	2021–22	Eerste Divisie	11	0	2	0	—		0	0	13	0
Career total			57	0	2	0	0	0	1	0	60	0

== Honours ==
Barcelona

- UEFA Youth League: 2017–18
