= Lucas Woudenberg =

Dutch footballer (born 1994)

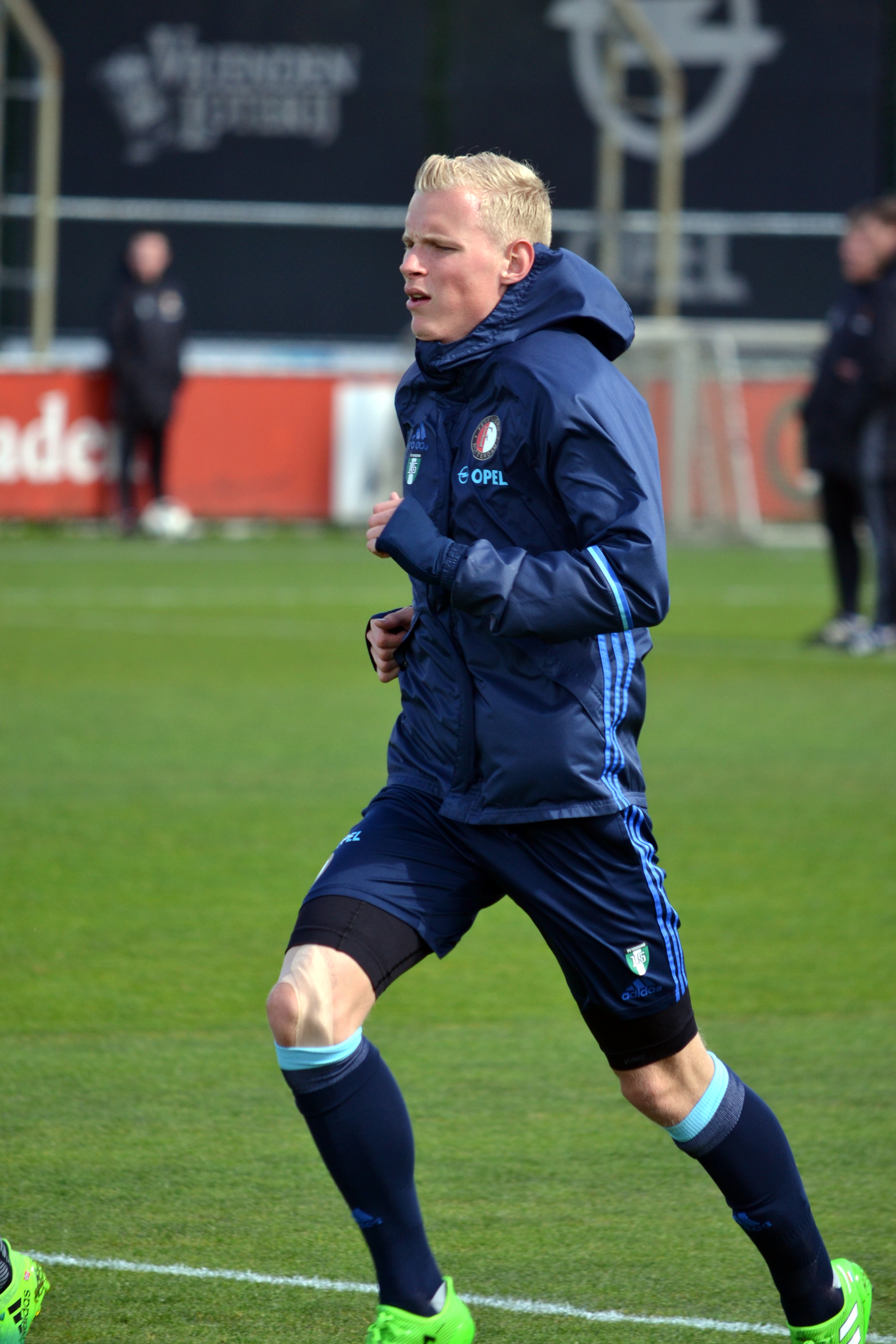

Personal information
- Date of birth: 25 April 1994 (age 32)
- Place of birth: Woerden, Netherlands
- Height: 1.86 m (6 ft 1 in)
- Position: Left-back

Team information
- Current team: Dordrecht
- Number: 23

Youth career
- vv Zwammerdam
- Feyenoord

Senior career*
Years	Team	Apps	(Gls)
2012–2017	Feyenoord	10	(0)
2013–2014	→ Excelsior (loan)	31	(0)
2015–2016	→ NEC (loan)	30	(1)
2017–2022	SC Heerenveen	113	(2)
2022–2023	Willem II	36	(2)
2023–2025	Valenciennes	46	(1)
2024–2025	Valenciennes II	2	(0)
2025–	Dordrecht	20	(1)

International career
2012–2013	Netherlands U19	9	(0)
2014	Netherlands U20	2	(0)
2015	Netherlands U21	1	(0)
- * Club domestic league appearances and goals as of 28 April 2026

Lucas Woudenberg (born 25 April 1994) is a Dutch professional footballer who plays as a left-back for Eerste Divisie club Dordrecht.

== Career ==
Woudenberg joined Willem II on 27 June 2022, signing a three-year contract.

On 5 August 2023, Willem II announced Woudenberg's transfer to Valenciennes in France.

On 2 September 2025, Woudenberg returned to the Netherlands and signed a two-season contract with Dordrecht.

== Career statistics ==
As of match played 25 October 2017

Appearances and goals by club, season and competition
Club	Season	League			KNVB Beker		Other		Total	
Club	Season	Division	Apps	Goals	Apps	Goals	Apps	Goals	Apps	Goals
Feyenoord	2013–14	Eredivisie	0	0	0	0	0	0	0	0
Feyenoord	2014–15	Eredivisie	2	0	0	0	1 (Note: Appearance in the Europa League)	0	3	0
Feyenoord	2015–16	Eredivisie	0	0	0	0	0	0	0	0
Feyenoord	2016–17	Eredivisie	8	0	3	0	0	0	11	0
Feyenoord	Feyenoord total		10	0	3	0	1	0	14	0
Excelsior (loan)	2013–14	Eerste Divisie	31	0	2	0	4 (Note: Appearances in the Eredivisie play-offs)	0	37	0
NEC (loan)	2015–16	Eredivisie	30	1	3	0	0	0	33	1
Heerenveen	2017–18	Eredivisie	9	0	2	0	0	0	11	0
Career total			80	1	10	0	5	0	95	1

== Honours ==
Feyenoord

- Eredivisie: 2016–17
