= Lowie van Zundert =

Dutch footballer (born 1998)

Personal information
- Date of birth: 23 September 1998 (age 28)
- Place of birth: Nijmegen, Netherlands
- Height: 1.92 m (6 ft 4 in)
- Position: Forward

Team information
- Current team: UDI '19
- Number: 9

Youth career
- VV Ravenstein
- 2008–2009: RKSV Margriet
- 2009–2017: NEC

Senior career*
Years	Team	Apps	(Gls)
2017–2019	NEC	0	(0)
2018	→ RKC Waalwijk (loan)	7	(0)
2019	→ De Treffers (loan)	18	(7)
2019–2021	De Treffers	27	(11)
2021–2022	Spakenburg	32	(7)
2022–2024	Kozakken Boys	55	(11)
2024–	UDI '19		
- * Club domestic league appearances and goals as of 10:01, 14 November 2024 (UTC)

Lowie van Zundert (born 23 September 1998) is a Dutch footballer who plays as a forward for UDI '19.

== Career ==
Born in Nijmegen, van Zundert spent his early career with VV Ravenstein and RKSV Margriet. He then played for NEC, spending loan spells at RKC Waalwijk and De Treffers. After playing for Spakenburg, he signed for Kozakken Boys in January 2022.
