= Joshua Sanches =

Dutch footballer (born 1998)

Personal information
- Full name: Joshua Jeremiah Sanches
- Date of birth: 8 July 1998 (age 28)
- Place of birth: Amsterdam, Netherlands
- Height: 1.84 m (6 ft 0 in)
- Position: Midfielder

Youth career
- 2003–2007: Zeeburgia
- 2007–2009: Ajax
- 2009–2014: AFC
- 2014–2018: Heerenveen

Senior career*
Years	Team	Apps	(Gls)
2018–2020	Jong Sparta	48	(2)
2018–2020	Sparta Rotterdam	1	(0)
2020–2023	TOP Oss	75	(6)
- * Club domestic league appearances and goals as of 24 June 2023

Joshua Jeremiah Sanches (born 8 July 1998) is a Dutch professional footballer who plays as a midfielder.

== Club career ==
=== Sparta Rotterdam ===
On 24 May 2018, Sanches signed a two-year contract with Sparta Rotterdam with an option to extend the contract for another year.

He made his Eerste Divisie debut for Sparta Rotterdam on 19 October 2018 in a game against Roda JC Kerkrade as a 42nd-minute substitute for Fankaty Dabo.

=== TOP Oss ===
On 29 August 2020, Sanches signed with TOP Oss as a replacement for injured Philippe Rommens. He made his debut on 5 September in a 0–3 loss to Roda JC Kerkrade, coming on as a substitute in the 61st minute for Mateo Aramburú. He finished his first season at the club with 21 appearances, in which he scored two goals.

== Personal life ==
Born in the Netherlands, Sanches is of Surinamese descent.
