= Jip Molenaar =

Dutch footballer (born 2001)

Personal information
- Full name: Jip Cornelis Willem Molenaar
- Date of birth: 15 February 2001 (age 25)
- Place of birth: Zaandam, Netherlands
- Height: 1.97 m (6 ft 6 in)
- Position: Centre-back

Team information
- Current team: DVVA

Youth career
- 2007–2011: SDOB
- 2011–2019: Volendam
- 2019–2020: Eintracht Frankfurt

Senior career*
Years	Team	Apps	(Gls)
2020–2021	Jong Volendam	6	(0)
2021	Volendam	1	(0)
2021–2022	Telstar	27	(1)
2023–	DVVA		
- * Club domestic league appearances and goals

Jip Cornelis Willem Molenaar (born 15 November 2001) is a Dutch professional footballer who plays as a centre-back for Dutch amateur club DVVA.

== Career ==
Molenaar made his professional debut for Volendam on 2 February 2021, replacing Denso Kasius in the 86th minute of a 3–1 away win over Go Ahead Eagles in the Eerste Divisie.

In June 2021, Molenaar signed a two-year contract with Telstar, with an option for an additional year. He left the club again after one season.

After almost a year without football, Molenaar started training with Dutch amateur club DVVA in spring 2023. After that, the parties continued to work together.

== Personal life ==
He is the son of former professional footballer Keje Molenaar and brother-in-law of Bayern Munich defender Matthijs de Ligt.
