= Paul Kerlin =

Scottish footballer

Personal information
- Date of birth: 18 October 1953 (age 73)
- Position: Midfielder

Senior career*
Years	Team	Apps	(Gls)
1976–1977	De Graafschap		
1978–1979	Go Ahead Eagles		
- * Club domestic league appearances and goals

Paul Kerlin (born 18 October 1953) is a Scottish former professional footballer. He played in the Netherlands for De Graafschap and Go Ahead Eagles.
