= 2018–19 FC Twente season =

FC Twente
2018–19 season
- Chairman: vacant
- Manager: Marino Pusic
- Stadium: De Grolsch Veste
- Eerste Divisie: 1st
- KNVB Cup: Quarter-Finals
- Top goalscorer: League: Tom Boere (13); Aitor (13); All: Aitor (16)
- Highest home attendance: 30,000 vs Jong AZ (22 April 2019)
- Lowest home attendance: 14,969 vs RKC Waalwijk (18 December 2018)
- Average home league attendance: 26,200

The 2018–19 season is FC Twente's second visit to the Eerste Divisie following their relegation from the 2017–18 Eredivisie. It marks their return to the second highest division in Dutch football after spending 34 consecutive seasons in the top flight of Dutch football. Marino Pusic was promoted to head coach after filling in as interim manager after the departure of Gertjan Verbeek during the 2017–18 season.

FC Twente were confirmed as champions of the 2018–19 Eerste Divisie season on 22 April 2019, finishing top of the Netherlands' second-highest tier of football for the first time in the club's history.

== Season review ==
=== Pre-season ===
FC Twente's pre-season got off to a rocky start. Following the relegation to the Eerste Divisie, the club was forced to slash spending after reducing the overall budget from 30 million to 18 million euros. In late June it became apparent that FC Twente was in dire need of financial help, leaving the club in great uncertainty about the future. The club even threatened to file for bankruptcy if the Enschede city council does not stand guarantee for 7 million euros. A few weeks later FC Twente announced it staved off bankruptcy after the city council agreed to a rescue plan. City officials agreed to freeze interest and repayments of a loan made to the club over a two-season period. In addition, some 30 of the club's sponsors have agreed to invest 10 million euros in the club.

On 31 May, FC Twente announced their first signing of the summer; the return of Dutch midfielder Wout Brama from Australian side Central Coast Mariners, signing him on a free transfer. Brama previously played at Twente between 2005 and 2014 where he won the Eredivisie in 2010.

== First team ==
As of 6 May 2019

Squad No.	Name	Nationality	Position(s)	Date of birth (age)
Goalkeepers
13	Nick Hengelman	(Netherlands)	GK	15 November 1989 (age 37)
16	Joël Drommel	(Netherlands)	GK	16 November 1996 (age 30)
22	Jeffrey de Lange	(Netherlands)	GK	1 April 1998 (age 28)
26	Jorn Brondeel	(Belgium)	GK	7 September 1993 (age 33)
Defenders
2	Ricardinho	(Brazil)	LB	9 September 1984 (age 42)
3	Xandro Schenk	(Netherlands)	CB	28 April 1993 (age 33)
4	Nacho Monsalve	(Spain)	CB	27 April 1994 (age 32)
21	Cristian González	(Uruguay)	CB	23 July 1996 (age 30)
25	Peet Bijen	(Netherlands)	CB	28 January 1995 (age 31)
27	Rafael Ramos	(Portugal)	RB	9 January 1995 (age 31)
28	Jeroen van der Lely	(Netherlands)	RB/LB	22 March 1996 (age 30)
Midfielders
6	Wout Brama (captain)	(Netherlands)	DM	21 August 1986 (age 40)
10	Haris Vučkić	(Slovenia)	AM	21 August 1992 (age 34)
11	Alexander Laukart	(Germany)	AM	25 October 1998 (age 28)
17	Tim Hölscher	(Germany)	AM/RW/LW	21 February 1995 (age 31)
18	Ulrich Bapoh	(Germany)	AM	29 June 1999 (age 27)
19	Javier Espinosa	(Spain)	CM	19 September 1992 (age 34)
20	Matt Smith	(Wales)	DM	22 November 1999 (age 26)
23	Jelle van der Heyden	(Netherlands)	CM	31 August 1995 (age 31)
Forwards
7	Aitor Cantalapiedra	(Spain)	RW	10 February 1996 (age 30)
8	Oussama Assaidi	(Morocco)	LW	15 August 1988 (age 38)
9	Tom Boere	(Netherlands)	ST	24 November 1992 (age 33)
14	Rafik Zekhnini	(Norway)	LW	12 January 1998 (age 28)
15	Fred Friday	(Nigeria)	ST	20 May 1995 (age 31)
24	Jari Oosterwijk	(Netherlands)	ST	3 March 1995 (age 31)
47	Mohamed Hamdaoui	(Netherlands)	LW	10 June 1993 (age 33)

== Transfers and loans ==
=== Summer ===
==== Transfers in ====
Entry date	Position	No.	Player	From club	Fee	Ref.
1 June 2018	MF	6	(Netherlands) Wout Brama	(Australia) Central Coast Mariners	Free transfer	
24 June 2018	MF	17	(Germany) Tim Hölscher	(Denmark) Esbjerg fB	Free transfer	
26 June 2018	FW	39	(Netherlands) Tim van de Schepop	(Netherlands) PEC Zwolle	Free transfer	
16 July 2018	DF	3	(Netherlands) Xandro Schenk	(Netherlands) Go Ahead Eagles	Free transfer	
31 July 2018	FW	7	(Spain) Aitor Cantalapiedra	(Spain) Sevilla Atlético	Undisclosed	
1 August 2018	DF	2	(Brazil) Ricardinho	(England) Oxford United	Free transfer	
3 August 2018	DF	4	(Spain) Nacho Monsalve	(Spain) Rayo Vallecano	Free transfer	
6 August 2018	DF	27	(Portugal) Rafael Ramos	(United States) Chicago Fire	Undisclosed	
31 August 2018	CM	19	(Spain) Javier Espinosa	(Spain) Levante UD	Undisclosed	

==== Loans in ====
Start date	End date	Position	No.	Player	From club	Fee	Ref.
25 June 2018	1 July 2019	MF	18	(Germany) Ulrich Bapoh	(Germany) VfL Bochum	Undisclosed	
3 July 2018	1 July 2019	MF	20	(Wales) Matt Smith	(England) Manchester City	Undisclosed	
15 August 2018	1 July 2019	DF	21	(Uruguay) Cristian González	(Spain) Sevilla Atlético	Undisclosed	
29 August 2018	1 July 2019	FW	14	(Norway) Rafik Zekhnini	(Italy) Fiorentina	Undisclosed	

==== Transfers out ====
Exit date	Position	No.	Player	To club	Fee	Ref.
29 May 2018	MF	21	(Netherlands) Danny Holla	(Netherlands) Den Bosch	Released	
1 June 2018	FW	34	(Morocco) Adnane Tighadouini	(Spain) Málaga	Loan return	
1 June 2018	FW	27	(Netherlands) Luciano Slagveer	(Belgium) Lokeren	Loan return	
1 June 2018	DF	15	(Chile) Cristián Cuevas	(Chile) Huachipato	Loan return	
1 June 2018	DF	3	(Finland) Thomas Lam	(England) Nottingham Forest	Loan return	
1 June 2018	FW	29	(Morocco) Mounir El Hamdaoui	(Netherlands) Excelsior	End of contract	
1 June 2018	DF	4	(Netherlands) Jos Hooiveld	(United States) Orange County	End of contract	
1 June 2018	MF	20	(Netherlands) Adam Maher	(Netherlands) AZ	End of contract	
14 June 2018	MF	18	(Austria) Michael Liendl	(Austria) Wolfsberger AC	Undisclosed	
14 June 2018	MF	17	(Austria) Marko Kvasina	(Austria) SV Mattersburg	Undisclosed	
15 June 2018	DF	2	(Netherlands) Hidde ter Avest	(Italy) Udinese	Released	
24 June 2018	DF	5	(Germany) Stefan Thesker	(Germany) Holstein Kiel	Released	
27 June 2018	MF	19	(Finland) Fredrik Jensen	(Germany) FC Augsburg	Undisclosed	
10 July 2018	DF		(Netherlands) Jelle van Benthem	(Netherlands) Heracles	Undisclosed	
23 July 2018	DF	14	(Finland) Richard Jensen	(Netherlands) Roda JC	Undisclosed	
26 July 2018	MF		(Netherlands) Delano Grootenhuis	(Netherlands) FC Emmen	Undisclosed	

=== Winter ===
==== Loans in ====
Start date	End date	Position	No.	Player	From club	Fee	Ref.
28 January 2019	1 July 2019	LW	47	(Netherlands) Mohamed Hamdaoui	(Netherlands) De Graafschap	Undisclosed	
30 January 2019	1 July 2019	FW	99	(Nigeria) Fred Friday	(Netherlands) AZ	Undisclosed	

==== Loans out ====
Start date	End date	Position	No.	Player	To club	Fee	Ref.
29 January 2019	1 July 2019	FW	30	(Netherlands) Dylan George	(Netherlands) Helmond Sport	Undisclosed	

=== New contracts ===
Date	Pos	No.	Player	Ref.
8 August 2018	MF		(Netherlands) Mats Wieffer	
8 August 2018	MF		(Netherlands) Redouan Taha el Idrissi	
8 August 2018	MF		(Netherlands) Ramiz Zerrouki	
8 August 2018	FW		(Germany) Xhelal Terziqi	

== Friendlies ==
FC Twente revealed pre-season fixtures against Heerenveen, FC Emmen, VVV-Venlo, Göztepe S.K. and Al-Taawoun.

=== Pre-season ===
Win Draw Loss

3 July 2018 Friendly	GFC Goor (Netherlands)	0–10	(Netherlands) Twente	Goor, Netherlands
		Report	Trotman 1', 6', 9', 38'; Bapoh 16'; Hölscher 28'; Van de Schepop 53'; Oosterwijk 70', 76'; Browning-Lagerfeld 74'

7 July 2018 Friendly	Fleringen (Netherlands)	1–5	(Netherlands) Twente	Fleringen, Netherlands
	Slaghekke 81'	Report	Trotman 14'; R. Jensen 18'; Bapoh 44'; Oosterwijk 79', 85'

18 July 2018 Friendly	Heerenveen (Netherlands)	1–1	(Netherlands) Twente	Langezwaag, Netherlands
	Mihajlović 85'	Report	Bapoh 50'

25 July 2018 Friendly	Twente (Netherlands)	1–5	(Netherlands) FC Emmen	Vriezenveen, Netherlands
	Brama 61' (.pen)	Report

27 July 2018 Friendly	VVV-Venlo (Netherlands)	2–1	(Netherlands) Twente	Venlo, Netherlands
		Report	Oosterwijk 76'	Stadium: De Koel; Attendance: 2200; Referee: Martin van den Kerkhof

2 August 2018 Friendly	Twente (Netherlands)	3–0	(Turkey) Göztepe SK	Goor, Netherlands
	Aitor 17'; Bapoh 41'; Smith 72'	Report

10 August 2018 Friendly	Twente (Netherlands)	2–2	(Saudi Arabia) Al-Taawoun	Goor, Netherlands
	Smith 7'; Aitor 54'	Report		Attendance: 2000

8 January 2019 Friendly	Bayer Leverkusen (Germany)	4–0	(Netherlands) Twente	Leverkusen, Germany
14:00 CET (UTC+1)	Alario 32'; Kohr 39'; Volland 57'; Bailey 77'	Report		Stadium: BayArena

== Competitions ==
=== Overview ===
Competition	Record							
Competition	G	W	D	L	GF	GA	GD	Win %
Eerste Divisie	32	23	3	6	64	30	+34	71.88
KNVB Cup	4	3	0	1	10	5	+5	75.00
Total	36	26	3	7	74	35	+39	72.22

Updated to match played 2 April 2019
Source: Competitions

=== Eerste Divisie ===
==== League table ====
Pos	Team	Pld	W	D	L	GF	GA	GD	Pts	Promotion or qualification
1	Twente (Note: Twente were deducted 1 point and winner of the Third Period (games 21–29).) (C, P)	38	25	5	8	72	39	+33	79	Promotion to the Eredivisie
2	Sparta Rotterdam (Note: Winner of the First Period (games 3–11).) (O, P)	38	19	12	7	78	47	+31	69	Qualification to promotion play-offs second round
3	Jong PSV (Note: Reserves teams aren't eligible to be promoted to the Eredivisie)	38	18	9	11	77	59	+18	63	
4	Den Bosch (Note: Winner of the Second Period (games 12–20).)	38	18	9	11	64	49	+15	63	Qualification to promotion play-offs second round
5	Go Ahead Eagles	38	19	6	13	63	57	+6	63	Qualification to promotion play-offs second round

Source: Soccerway, Keuken Kampioen Divisie (in Dutch)
Rules for classification: Season in progress: 1) Most points won; 2) Less points lost; 3) Goal difference; 4) Goals scored; 5) Alphabetical order. End of season: 1) Points; 2) Goal difference; 3) Goals scored; 4) Head-to-head points; 5) Head-to-head goal difference; 6) Head-to-head away goals scored; 7) Play-off if relevant for deciding champion, relegation, international competitions and play-offs qualification, otherwise by draw. 8) Penalty shoot-out (only after a play-off)
(C) Champions; (O) Play-off winners; (P) Promoted

==== Results by matchday ====
Matchday	1	2	3	4	5	6	7	8	9	10	11	12	13	14	15	16	17	18	19	20	21	22	23	24	25	26	27	28	29	30	31	32	33	34	35	36	37	38
Ground	H	A	H	H	A	A	H	A	H	A	H	H	A	H	A	H	A	A	H	A	H	A	H	A	A	H	A	A	H	A	H	A	H	H	A	H	A	H
Result	W	D	W	L	W	W	W	D	L	W	W	W	L	L	W	L	W	W	W	W	W	W	W	W	W	W	D	W	W	W	W	L	L	W	D	L	W	D
Position	4	5	2	8	6	5	3	3	5	3	3	3	5	5	5	5	4	4	4	2	2	1	1	1	1	1	1	1	1	1	1	1	1	1	1	1	1	1

Updated to match(es) played on 2 April 2019. Source: FC Twente
A = Away; H = Home; W = Win; D = Draw; L = Loss

==== Matches ====
On 15 June 2018, the Eerste Divisie fixtures for the forthcoming season were announced.

17 August 2018 1	Twente	2–1	Sparta	Enschede
20:00 CEST	Bapoh 10'; Boere 40' (pen.)	Report	Veldwijk 16'	Stadium: De Grolsch Veste; Attendance: 27,200; Referee: Kamphuis

24 August 2018 2	Helmond Sport	2–2	Twente	Helmond
20:00 CEST	Zeldenrust 57'; Meijers 89'	Report	Boere 77' (pen.); Oosterwijk 90'	Stadium: SolarUnie Stadion; Attendance: 2,634; Referee: van Boekel

31 August 2018 3	Twente	3–1	Roda JC	Enschede
20:00 CEST	Hölscher 17'; Boere 20'; Bapoh 67'	Report	Paulissen 4'	Stadium: De Grolsch Veste; Attendance: 26,100; Referee: Mulder

8 September 2018 4	Twente	1–2	TOP Oss	Enschede
18:30 CEST	Aitor 29'	Report	Smeets 15'; Dogan 22'	Stadium: De Grolsch Veste; Attendance: 26,000; Referee: Van de Graaf

14 September 2018 5	Dordrecht	0–2	Twente	Dordrecht
20:00 CEST		Report	Bijen 19'; Stankov 33' (o.g.)	Stadium: GN Bouw Stadion; Attendance: 2,662; Referee: Gerrets

21 September 2018 6	Telstar	1–3	Twente	IJmuiden
20:00 CEST	Sno 4'	Report	Boere 8'; Oosterwijk 77'; Zekhnini 90+1'	Stadium: Rabobank IJmond Stadion; Attendance: 3,263; Referee: Gözübüyük

30 September 2018 7	Twente	2–1	Jong PSV	Enschede
14:30 CEST	Boere 62' (.pen); Aitor 86'	Report	Rigo 7'	Stadium: De Grolsch Veste; Attendance: 25,300; Referee: Lindhout

5 October 2018 8	FC Eindhoven	1–1	Twente	Eindhoven
20:00 CEST	Seedorf 90+3'	Report	Aitor 56'	Stadium: Jan Louwers Stadion; Attendance: 2,507; Referee: Blank

14 October 2018 9	Twente	0–1	MVV	Enschede
16:45 CEST		Report	van den Hurk 60'	Stadium: De Grolsch Veste; Attendance: 25,100; Referee: Dieperink

22 October 2018 10	Jong FC Utrecht	1–6	Twente	Utrecht
20:00 CEST	Venema 62'	Report	Boere 11' (.pen); Espinosa 14', 56'; Zekhnini 41'; Oosterwijk 69', 78'	Stadium: De Galgenwaard; Attendance: 1,577; Referee: Perez

26 October 2018 11	Twente	1–0	Almere City	Enschede
20:00 CEST	Boere 8'	Report		Stadium: De Grolsch Veste; Attendance: 25,400; Referee: Oostrom

2 November 2018 12	Twente	3–1	RKC Waalwijk	Enschede
20:00 CEST	Bijen 17'; Aitor 39'; Maria 80'	Report	Seys 90+2'	Stadium: De Grolsch Veste; Attendance: 23,800; Referee: Mulder

9 November 2018 13	FC Den Bosch	2–1	Twente	Den Bosch
20:00 CEST	Velkov (yellow card) 7' (yellow-red card) 77' (goal) 24'; Beltrame 19'; van der Winden (yellow card) 90+6'	Summary	Rafael Ramos (yellow card) 23'; Boere 32'; Javier Espinosa (yellow card) 90+6'	Stadium: De Vliert; Attendance: 5,086; Referee: Pol van Boekel

18 November 2018 14	Twente	0–1	Go Ahead Eagles	Enschede
14:30 CEST	Hölscher (yellow card) 60'; Smith (yellow card) 90+1'	Summary	Verheydt (yellow card) 33'; Navrátil 45+1'; Bakx (yellow card) 60'; Lelieveld (yellow card) 82' (yellow-red card) 84'; van Moorsel (yellow card) 84'; Bosz (yellow card) 90+1'	Stadium: De Grolsch Veste; Attendance: 29,500; Referee: Edwin van de Graaf

26 November 2018 15	Jong AZ	1–2	Twente	Alkmaar
20:00 CEST	Jacobs (yellow card) 39'; Wijndal (yellow card) 57'; Druijf 86'	Summary	Boere 32'; Smith 79'; Zekhnini (yellow card) 90+5'	Stadium: AFAS Stadion; Attendance: 1,250; Referee: Freek Van Herk

30 November 2018 16	Twente	2–5	Jong Ajax	Enschede
20:00 CEST	Espinosa 6'; Hölscher (yellow card) 46'; Bijen 50'; Drommel (yellow card) 58'; Aitor (yellow card) 60'; Nacho (yellow card) 75'; González (red card) 90+1'	Summary	Botman (yellow card) 9' (goal) 18'; Dest 38'; Ekkelenkamp 42', 56'; Černý 54' (pen.)	Stadium: De Grolsch Veste; Attendance: 25,000; Referee: Clay Ruperti

7 December 2018 17	FC Volendam	1–2	Twente	Volendam
20:00 CEST	Peters (yellow card) 38'; Schouten (yellow card) 42'; Deul 74'; Bäly (red card) 88'	Summary	Zekhnini (yellow card) 8'; Brama 45' (yellow card) 90+1'; Smith (yellow card) 65'; Bijen 89'	Stadium: Kras Stadion; Attendance: 4,752; Referee: Sander van der Eijk

14 December 2018 18	SC Cambuur	0–1	Twente	Leeuwarden
20:00 CEST	Rossi (yellow card) 39'	Summary	Aitor 61'; Schenk (yellow card) 88'	Stadium: Cambuur Stadion; Attendance: 8,191; Referee: Joey Kooij

21 December 2018 19	Twente	2–0	N.E.C.	Enschede
20:00 CEST	Zekhnini 30'; Oosterwijk 47'; Espinosa (yellow card) 65'; Schenk (yellow card) 74'	Summary	Okita (yellow card) 65'; Sabak (red card) 83'	Stadium: De Grolsch Veste; Attendance: 24,600; Referee: Martin Perez

13 January 2019 20	MVV	0–2	Twente	Maastricht
14:30 CEST		Summary	Bijen (yellow card) 11'; Zekhnini 40'; Brama 45+2'; González (yellow card) 68'	Stadium: De Geusselt; Attendance: 5,009; Referee: Blom

18 January 2019 21	Twente	1–0	Jong FC Utrecht	Enschede
20:00 CEST	Smith 13'; Nacho (yellow card) 90+4'	Summary	Hoogenhout (yellow card) 50'	Stadium: De Grolsch Veste; Attendance: 24,100; Referee: Pérez

26 January 2019 22	Almere City	1–3	Twente	Almere
19:45 CEST	Receveur (yellow card) 23'; Loen (yellow card) 35'; Meijer 50'; Van Vlerken (yellow card) 50'	Summary	Aitor 9'; Boere 36'; Brama (yellow card) 41'; Nacho 72'	Stadium: Yanmar Stadion; Attendance: 2,854; Referee: Blank

1 February 2019 23	Twente	4–1	Helmond Sport	Enschede
20:00 CEST	Boere 11' (pen.); Aitor 49'; Nacho 34', 60'	Summary	Knops (yellow card) 10'; Snepvangers 70'; Velanas (yellow card) 88'	Stadium: De Grolsch Veste; Attendance: 24,200; Referee: Bax

8 February 2019 24	Sparta	0–3	Twente	Rotterdam
20:00 CEST	Vriends 51' (o.g.); Drenthe (yellow card) 29'; Duarte (yellow card) 75'	Summary	Boere (pen.), 22'; González (yellow card) 47'; Bijen 43'; Ricardinho (yellow card) 90'	Stadium: Het Kasteel; Attendance: 10,000; Referee: Gözübüyük

18 February 2019 25	Jong PSV	0–2	Twente	Eindhoven
20:00 CEST		Summary	Aitor 15'; Nacho (yellow card) 23'; Schenk (yellow card) 43'; Boere (pen.), 78'	Stadium: De Herdgang; Attendance: 1,057; Referee: Van der Eijk

22 February 2019 26	Twente	1–0	FC Eindhoven	Enschede
20:00 CEST	Aitor (pen.), 90+6'	Summary		Stadium: De Grolsch Veste; Attendance: 25,700; Referee: Van Herk

1 March 2019 27	Roda JC	1–1	Twente	Kerkrade
20:00 CEST	Engels 28'	Summary	Van der Heyden (yellow card) 62' (yellow-red card) 88'; Aitor 66'; Drommel (yellow card) 82'	Stadium: Parkstad Limburg Stadion; Attendance: 7,162; Referee: Manschot

8 March 2019 28	TOP Oss	0–2	Twente	Oss
20:00 CEST		Summary	Asmelash 4' (o.g.); Schenk 86'	Stadium: Frans Heesen Stadion; Attendance: 3,311; Referee: Lindhout

15 March 2019 29	Twente	5–0	FC Volendam	Enschede
20:00 CEST	Espinosa 8'; Ricardinho 14'; Bijen 33'; Aitor 35'; Oosterwijk 75'	Summary		Stadium: De Grolsch Veste; Attendance: 26,400; Referee: van den Kerkhof

24 March 2019 30	Go Ahead Eagles	1–2	Twente	Deventer
15:30 CEST	Verheydt 71'	Report	Oosterwijk 16'; Van der Heyden (yellow card) 44'; Brama (yellow card) 68'; Aitor 81'	Stadium: De Adelaarshorst; Attendance: 9,851; Referee: Kooij

29 March 2019 31	Twente	1–0	Den Bosch	Enschede
20:00 CEST	Oosterwijk 54'	Report		Stadium: De Grolsch Veste; Attendance: 28,800; Referee: Dieperink

1 April 2019 32	RKC Waalwijk	4–1	Twente	Waalwijk
20:00 CEST	Ricardinho 86' (o.g.)	Report	Aitor 64'; Oosterwijk (yellow card) 75'	Stadium: Mandemakers Stadion; Attendance: 3,200; Referee: Bax

5 April 2019 33	Twente	v	FC Dordrecht	Enschede
20:00 CEST				Stadium: De Grolsch Veste

12 April 2019 34	Twente	v	Telstar	Enschede
20:00 CEST				Stadium: De Grolsch Veste

19 April 2019 35	Jong Ajax	v	Twente	Amsterdam
20:00 CEST				Stadium: De Toekomst

22 April 2019 36	Twente	v	Jong AZ	Enschede
14:30 CEST				Stadium: De Grolsch Veste

26 April 2019 37	N.E.C.	v	Twente	Nijmegen
20:00 CEST				Stadium: Stadion de Goffert

3 May 2019 38	Twente	v	SC Cambuur	Enschede
20:00 CEST				Stadium: De Grolsch Veste

=== KNVB Cup ===
Win Draw Loss

27 September 2018 First round	Groningen	0–2	Twente	Groningen
18:30 CEST		Report	Espinosa 45'; Bijen 68'	Stadium: Euroborg; Referee: Makkelie

30 October 2018 Second round	Twente	4–2	VV Noordwijk	Enschede
19:45 CEST	Espinosa 28', 39'; Aitor 30'; Zekhnini 90+2'	Report		Stadium: De Grolsch Veste; Attendance: 14,800; Referee: Bax

18 December 2018 Round of 16	Twente	2–0	RKC Waalwijk	Enschede
19:45 CEST	Schenk 26'; Oosterwijk 90+2'	Summary		Stadium: De Grolsch Veste; Attendance: 14,969; Referee: Richard Martens

23 January 2019 Quarter-Finals	Twente	2–3	Willem II	Enschede
18:30 CEST	Aitor 54', 63'; Nacho (yellow card) 42'	Summary	Llonch (yellow card) 27'; Heerkens (yellow card) 27'; González 62' (o.g.); Pavlidis 76'; Kristinsson 87'	Stadium: De Grolsch Veste; Attendance: 19,560; Referee: Kamphuis

== Statistics ==
=== Appearances and goals ===
As of 2 April 2019

No.	Pos	Nat	Player	Total		Eerste Divisie		KNVB Cup	
No.	Pos	Nat	Player	Apps	Goals	Apps	Goals	Apps	Goals
2	DF	(Brazil) BRA	Ricardinho	31	1	28	1	3	0
3	DF	(Netherlands) NED	Xandro Schenk	9	2	8	1	1	1
4	DF	(Spain) ESP	Nacho Monsalve	24	3	20	3	4	0
5	DF	(Curaçao) CUW	Michaël Maria	10	1	9	1	1	0
6	MF	(Netherlands) NED	Wout Brama	25	2	22	2	3	0
7	FW	(Spain) ESP	Aitor Cantalapiedra	35	16	31	13	4	3
8	MF	(Morocco) MAR	Oussama Assaidi	8	0	8	0	0	0
9	FW	(Netherlands) NED	Tom Boere	30	13	27	13	3	0
10	MF	(Slovenia) SLO	Haris Vučkić	1	0	1	0	0	0
11	MF	(Germany) GER	Alexander Laukart	3	0	2	0	1	0
13	GK	(Netherlands) NED	Nick Hengelman	0	0	0	0	0	0
14	FW	(Norway) NOR	Rafik Zekhnini	24	5	22	4	2	1
16	GK	(Netherlands) NED	Joël Drommel	35	0	31	0	4	0
17	FW	(Germany) GER	Tim Hölscher	22	1	19	1	3	0
18	MF	(Germany) GER	Ulrich Bapoh	11	2	9	2	2	0
19	MF	(Spain) ESP	Javier Espinosa	31	7	27	4	4	3
20	MF	(Wales) WAL	Matt Smith	32	2	29	2	3	0
21	DF	(Uruguay) URU	Cristian González	31	0	29	0	2	0
22	GK	(Netherlands) NED	Jeffrey de Lange	0	0	0	0	0	0
23	MF	(Netherlands) NED	Jelle van der Heyden	13	0	12	0	1	0
24	FW	(Netherlands) NED	Jari Oosterwijk	28	9	25	8	3	1
25	DF	(Netherlands) NED	Peet Bijen	33	7	29	6	4	1
26	GK	(Belgium) BEL	Jorn Brondeel	1	0	1	0	0	0
27	DF	(Portugal) POR	Rafael Ramos	19	0	17	0	2	0
28	DF	(Netherlands) NED	Jeroen van der Lely	2	0	2	0	0	0
33	MF	(Netherlands) NED	Mats Wieffer	1	0	0	0	1	0
34	MF	(Netherlands) NED	Godfried Roemeratoe	1	0	1	0	0	0
47	FW	(Netherlands) NED	Mohamed Hamdaoui	6	0	6	0	0	0
99	FW	(Nigeria) NGR	Fred Friday	9	0	9	0	0	0
Players who left the club during the 2018–19 season
30	FW	(Netherlands) NED	Dylan George	7	0	5	0	2	0

=== Goalscorers ===
As of 2 April 2019

Rank	Player	Position	Eerste Divisie	KNVB Cup	Total
1	(Spain) Aitor	FW	13	3	16
2	(Netherlands) Tom Boere	FW	13	0	13
3	(Netherlands) Jari Oosterwijk	FW	8	1	9
4	(Spain) Javier Espinosa	AM	4	3	7
5	(Netherlands) Peet Bijen	DF	6	1	7
6	(Norway) Rafik Zekhnini	FW	4	1	5
7	(Spain) Nacho Monsalve	DF	3	0	3
8	(Germany) Ulrich Bapoh	AM	2	0	2
9	(Netherlands) Wout Brama	CM	2	0	2
10	(Wales) Matt Smith	CM	2	0	2
11	(Netherlands) Xandro Schenk	DF	1	1	2
12	(Germany) Tim Hölscher	AM	1	0	1
13	(Curaçao) Michaël Maria	DF	1	0	1
14	(Brazil) Ricardinho	DF	1	0	1
Own goals			3	0	3
Total			64	10	74
