= 2016–17 FC Twente season =

FC Twente
2016-17 season
- Chairman: Jan Schutrups
- Manager: René Hake
- Stadium: Grolsch Veste
- Eredivisie: 7th
- KNVB Cup: First Round
- Top goalscorer: League: Enes Ünal (18 goals); All: Enes Ünal (19 goals)
- Highest home attendance: 28,600 vs Heracles (20 January 2017)
- Lowest home attendance: 22,000 vs Utrecht (22 September 2016)
Home colours	Away colours	Third colours

During the 2016–17 FC Twente season, the club participated in the Eredivisie and the KNVB Cup.

== Squad ==
Squad No.	Name	Nationality	Position(s)	Date of Birth (Age)	Signed from
Goalkeepers
1	Nick Marsman	(Netherlands)	GK	1 October 1990 (age 36)	Youth Academy
16	Joël Drommel	(Netherlands)	GK	16 November 1996 (age 30)	Youth Academy
20	Sonny Stevens	(Netherlands)	GK	22 June 1992 (age 34)	(Netherlands) Volendam
35	Nick Hengelman	(Netherlands)	GK	15 November 1989 (age 37)	(Netherlands) Oss
Defenders
2	Hidde ter Avest	(Netherlands)	RB	20 May 1997 (age 29)	Youth Academy
3	Joachim Andersen	(Denmark)	CB	31 May 1996 (age 30)	Youth Academy
4	Jos Hooiveld	(Netherlands)	CB	22 April 1983 (age 43)	(Sweden) AIK
5	Stefan Thesker (c)	(Germany)	CB	11 April 1991 (age 35)	(Germany) Greuther Fürth
6	Dejan Trajkovski	(Slovenia)	LB	14 April 1992 (age 34)	(Slovenia) Domžale
25	Peet Bijen	(Netherlands)	CB	28 January 1995 (age 31)	Youth Academy
28	Jeroen van der Lely	(Netherlands)	RB	22 March 1996 (age 30)	Youth Academy
Midfielders
7	Chinedu Ede	(Germany)	CM	5 February 1987 (age 39)	(Germany) Mainz 05
10	Bersant Celina	(Kosovo)	AM	9 September 1996 (age 30)	(England) Manchester City
21	Kyle Ebecilio	(Netherlands)	CM	17 February 1994 (age 32)	(England) Arsenal
22	Kamohelo Mokotjo	(South Africa)	DM	11 March 1991 (age 35)	(Netherlands) PEC Zwolle
23	Jelle van der Heyden	(Netherlands)	DM	31 August 1995 (age 31)	Youth Academy
43	Mateusz Klich	(Poland)	CM	13 June 1990 (age 36)	(Germany) 1. FC Kaiserslautern
Forwards
8	Oussama Assaidi	(Morocco)	RW/LW	15 August 1988 (age 38)	(United Arab Emirates) Al-Ahli
11	Dylan Seys	(Belgium)	RW/LW	26 September 1996 (age 30)	(Belgium) Club Brugge
12	Tim Hölscher	(Germany)	RW/LW	21 May 1995 (age 31)	Youth Academy
17	Enes Ünal	(Turkey)	CF	10 May 1997 (age 29)	(England) Manchester City
18	Yaw Yeboah	(Ghana)	RW/LW	28 March 1997 (age 29)	(England) Manchester City
19	Fredrik Jensen	(Finland)	RW/LW	9 September 1997 (age 29)	Youth Academy
27	Enis Bunjaki	(Germany)	CF	17 October 1997 (age 29)	(Germany) Eintracht Frankfurt
30	Dylan George	(Netherlands)	RW	27 June 1998 (age 28)	Youth Academy

Last updated: 4 March 2017

== New contracts ==
No.	Pos	Player	Contract length	Contract end	Date	Source
-	DF	(Finland) Richard Jensen	3 years	2020	27 January 2017	
19	FW	(Finland) Fredrik Jensen	3 years	2020	27 January 2017	
24	FW	(Netherlands) Jari Oosterwijk	3 years	2020	27 January 2017	
25	CB	(Netherlands) Peet Bijen	3 years	2020	21 December 2016	
28	RB	(Netherlands) Jeroen van der Lely	3 years	2020	19 December 2016	

Last updated: 29 January 2017

== Transfers ==
=== In ===
==== Summer ====
No.	Pos	Player	Transferred From	Fee	Date	Source
5	DF	(Germany) Stefan Thesker	(Germany) Greuther Fürth	Free	14 July 2016	
4	DF	(Greece) Giorgos Katsikas	(Greece) PAOK	Free	12 August 2016	
13	GK	(Netherlands) Nick Hengelman	(Netherlands) Oss	Free	12 August 2016	
43	MF	(Poland) Mateusz Klich	(Germany) 1. FC Kaiserslautern	Free	26 August 2016	

==== Winter ====
No.	Pos	Player	Transferred From	Fee	Date	Source
8	FW	(Morocco) Oussama Assaidi	(Saudi Arabia) Al-Ahli	Free	24 December 2016	
6	DF	(Slovenia) Dejan Trajkovski	(Slovenia) Domžale	Undisclosed	19 January 2017	
4	DF	(Netherlands) Jos Hooiveld	(Sweden) AIK	Undisclosed	25 January 2017	
27	FW	(Germany) Enis Bunjaki	(Germany) Eintracht Frankfurt	Undisclosed	31 January 2017	

=== Out ===
==== Summer ====
No.	Pos	Player	Transferred To	Fee	Date	Source
3	DF	(Brazil) Bruno Uvini	(Italy) Napoli	End of loan	30 June 2016	
8	FW	(Poland) Oskar Zawada	(Germany) VfL Wolfsburg	End of loan	30 June 2016	
11	FW	(Ghana) Thomas Agyepong	(England) Manchester City	End of loan	30 June 2016	
18	FW	(Netherlands) Zakaria El Azzouzi	(Netherlands) Ajax	End of loan	30 June 2016	
5	DF	(Netherlands) Robbert Schilder	(Netherlands) Cambuur	Free	30 June 2016	
6	CM	(Chile) Felipe Gutiérrez	(Spain) Real Betis	Undisclosed	6 July 2016	
26	FW	(Netherlands) Jerson Cabral	(France) Bastia	Free	12 July 2016	
10	AM	(Morocco) Hakim Ziyech	(Netherlands) Ajax	€11,000,000	30 August 2016	

==== Winter ====
No.	Pos	Player	Transferred To	Fee	Date	Source
4	DF	(Greece) Giorgos Katsikas	(Denmark) Esbjerg	Free	23 January 2017	
-	FW	(Norway) Torgeir Børven	Unknown	Free	23 January 2017	

=== Loan in ===
==== Summer ====
No.	Pos	Player	Loaned From	Start	End	Source
11	FW	(Belgium) Dylan Seys	(Belgium) Club Brugge	12 July 2016	30 June 2017	
14	FW	(Ghana) Yaw Yeboah	(England) Manchester City	21 July 2016	30 June 2017	
17	FW	(Turkey) Enes Ünal	(England) Manchester City	23 July 2016	30 June 2017	
6	DF	(Slovenia) Dejan Trajkovski	(Slovenia) Domžale	30 July 2016	30 June 2017	
10	MF	(Kosovo) Bersant Celina	(England) Manchester City	25 August 2016	30 June 2017	

=== Loan out ===
==== Summer ====
No.	Pos	Player	Loaned To	Start	End	Source
27	FW	(Netherlands) Alessio Da Cruz	(Netherlands) Dordrecht	11 August 2016	30 June 2017	
9	FW	(Norway) Torgeir Børven	(Norway) Brann	16 August 2016	30 June 2017	

=== Winter ===
No.	Pos	Player	Loaned To	Start	End	Source
-	MF	(Ghana) Shadrach Eghan	(Denmark) Vendsyssel FF	31 January 2017	30 June 2017	
24	FW	(Netherlands) Jari Oosterwijk	(Netherlands) NAC Breda	31 January 2017	30 June 2017	

Last updated: 31 January 2017

== Non-competitive ==
=== Friendlies ===
25 June 2016 Friendly	EMOS (Netherlands)	0–6	(Netherlands) Twente	Enschede
15:00		Report	Andersen 29'; Gouriye 48'; Gouriye 55'; Vankan 77'; Ben Amar 81'; De Jager 86'	Stadium: Sportpark EMOS; Attendance: 1.500; Referee: Bas Nijhuis

29 June 2016 Friendly	Selectie Twenterand (Netherlands)	0–5	(Netherlands) Twente	Vriezenveen
19:00		Report	Ziyech 4'; Mokotjo 30'; Gouriye 60'; De Jager 69'; Ben Amar 90'	Stadium: Sportpark Het Midden; Attendance: 1.500; Referee: Maurice Paarhuis

6 July 2016 Friendly	Twente (Netherlands)	0–1	(Denmark) Nordsjælland	Mariënberg
19:00		Report	Lobotka 49'	Stadium: Sportpark Het Westerpark; Attendance: 1.500; Referee: Dennis Higler

16 July 2016 Friendly	Twente (Netherlands)	0–2	(Greece) PAOK	Vriezenveen
15:00		Report	Shakov 77'; Djalma 81'	Stadium: Sportpark Het Midden; Attendance: 2.500; Referee: Danny Makelie

23 July 2016 Friendly	Twente (Netherlands)	3–3	(Saudi Arabia) Al-Taawoun	Beckum
15:00	Jensen 46'; Oosterwijk 50'; Ziyech 59'	Report	Otaif 37'; Al-Salman 67'; Al-Hussain 68'	Stadium: Sportpark De Kruudnhof; Attendance: 1.500; Referee: Serdar Gözübüyük

27 July 2016 Friendly	Twente (Netherlands)	1–2	(England) Southampton	Oldenzaal
19:00	Bijen 74'	Report	Van Dijk 16'; Gallagher 68'	Stadium: Sportpark Vondersweijde; Attendance: 4,300; Referee: Siemen Mulder

30 July 2016 Friendly	Twente (Netherlands)	1–1	(Turkey) Konyaspor	Nordhorn
15:00	Ziyech 62'	Report	Rangelov 86' (pen.)	Stadium: N/a; Attendance: N/a; Referee: N/a

Last updated: 17 August 2016

== Competitions ==
=== Eredivisie ===
==== League table ====
Pos	Team	Pld	W	D	L	GF	GA	GD	Pts	Qualification or relegation
5	Vitesse	34	15	6	13	51	40	+11	51	Qualification for the Europa League group stage (Note: Vitesse qualified for the Europa League group stage by winning the 2016–17 KNVB Cup.)
6	AZ	34	12	13	9	56	52	+4	49	Qualification for the European competition play-offs (Note: Four teams played for a spot in the Europa League second qualifying round.)
7	Twente (Note: Twente was excluded from European football for 3 years on 15 December 2015.)	34	12	9	13	48	50	−2	45	
8	Groningen	34	10	13	11	55	51	+4	43	Qualification for the European competition play-offs
9	Heerenveen	34	12	7	15	54	53	+1	43	Qualification for the European competition play-offs

Source: NUsport (in Dutch), Soccerway
Rules for classification: 1) Points; 2) Goal difference; 3) Goals scored; 4) Play-off (only for deciding champion and relegation); 5) Head-to-head points; 6) Head-to-head goal difference; 7) Head-to-head away goals scored; 8) Draw. (Note: Criteria 5-8 is only used if deciding Europa League play-off places)

==== League matches ====
6 August 2016 1	Twente	1–2	Excelsior	Enschede
19:45 GMT	Oosterwijk 82'	Report	Vermeulen 13'; Owusu 61'	Stadium: De Grolsch Veste; Attendance: 25,100; Referee: Mulder

14 August 2016 2	Feyenoord	2–0	Twente	Rotterdam
14:30 GMT	Toornstra 23'; Jørgensen 80'	Report		Stadium: De Kuip; Attendance: 47,500; Referee: Makkelie

21 August 2016 3	Groningen	3–4	Twente	Groningen
12:30 GMT	Mahi 52'; Idrissi 69'; Hoesen 84'	Report	Ünal 23', 36', 39'; Oosterwijk 90+2'	Stadium: Noordlease Stadion; Attendance: 18,051; Referee: Blom

27 August 2016 4	Twente	3–1	Sparta Rotterdam	Enschede
20:45 GMT	Ziyech 14', 59'; Yeboah 36'	Report	Brogno 54'	Stadium: De Grolsch Veste; Attendance: 23,700; Referee: Wiedemeijer

10 September 2016 5	Heerenveen	3–1	Twente	Heerenveen
20:45 GMT	Ghoochannejhad 34', 90+3'; Larsson 66'	Report	Celina 78'	Stadium: Abe Lenstra Stadion; Attendance: 20,850; Referee: Kamphuis

17 September 2016 6	Twente	4–1	ADO Den Haag	Enschede
18:30 GMT	Ünal 35'; Celina 54'; Mokotjo 90'	Report	Jansen 88'	Stadium: De Grolsch Veste; Attendance: 24,100; Referee: van Boekel

25 September 2016 7	Twente	2–1	Vitesse	Enschede
14:30 GMT	Ünal 16'; Celina 85'		Baker 90+2'	Stadium: De Grolsch Veste; Attendance: 22,000; Referee: Manschot

2 October 2016 8	Heracles	1–1	Twente	Almelo
14:30 GMT	Armenteros 42'	Report	Klich 40' (pen.)	Stadium: Polman Stadion; Attendance: 12,052; Referee: Danny Makkelie

16 October 2016 9	Twente	2–2	PEC Zwolle	Enschede
12:30 GMT	Klich 10' (pen.); Ünal 77'	Report	Mokhtar 40'; Warmerdam 84'	Stadium: De Grolsch Veste; Attendance: 24,900; Referee: Dennis Higler

22 October 2016 10	Go Ahead Eagles	0–2	Twente	Deventer
18:30 GMT		Report	Yeboah 44'; Celina 89'	Stadium: Adelaarshorst; Attendance: 9,733; Referee: Martin van den Kerkhof

28 October 2016 11	Twente	0–0	Roda JC	Enschede
20:00 GMT		Report		Stadium: De Grolsch Veste; Attendance: 24,400; Referee: Richard Liesveld

5 November 2016 12	PSV	1–1	Twente	Eindhoven
19:45 GMT	Moreno 62'	Report	Ünal 53'	Stadium: Philips Stadion; Attendance: 33,500; Referee: Serdar Gözübüyük

20 November 2016 13	Twente	1–1	Utrecht	Enschede
14:30 GMT	Ter Avest 22'	Report	Zivkovic 26'	Stadium: De Grolsch Veste; Attendance: 25,100; Referee: Allard Lindhout

26 November 2016 14	NEC	3–2	Twente	Nijmegen
20:45 GMT	Grot 27', 35'; Đumić 59'	Report	Ünal 51'; Dyrestam 79' (o.g.)	Stadium: Stadion de Goffert; Attendance: 11,092; Referee: Dennis Higler

4 December 2016 15	Willem II	0–0	Twente	Tilburg
14:30 GMT		Report		Stadium: Koning Willem II Stadion; Attendance: 11,450; Referee: Ed Janssen

11 December 2016 16	Twente	1–0	Ajax	Enschede
16:45 GMT	Klich 90+2' (pen.)	Report		Stadium: De Grolsch Veste; Attendance: 27,800; Referee: Dennis Higler

17 December 2016 17	Twente	1–2	AZ	Enschede
20:45 GMT	Ünal 68'	Report	Weghorst 46'; Bijen 90+2' (o.g.)	Stadium: De Grolsch Veste; Attendance: 24,500; Referee: Jochen Kamphuis

15 January 2017 18	Vitesse	3–1	Twente	Arnhem
14:30 GMT	Baker 13'; Van Wolfswinkel 39'; Rashica 47'	Report	Klich 78' (pen.)	Stadium: GelreDome; Attendance: 15,194; Referee: Janssen

20 January 2017 19	Twente	1–0	Heracles	Enschede
20:00 GMT	Andersen 10'	Report		Stadium: De Grolsch Veste; Attendance: 28,600; Referee: Makkelie

29 January 2017 20	PEC Zwolle	1–2	Twente	Zwolle
14:30 GMT	Menig 31'	Report	Seys 8'; Assaidi 55'	Stadium: MAC³PARK Stadion; Attendance: 12,800; Referee: van den Kerkhof

5 February 2017 21	Twente	0–2	Feyenoord	Enschede
14:30 GMT		Report	Botteghin 75'; Jørgensen 87'	Stadium: De Grolsch Veste; Attendance: 27,000; Referee: Higler

12 February 2017 22	Excelsior	1–1	Twente	Rotterdam
12:30 GMT	Hasselbaink 15'	Report	Jensen 35'	Stadium: Stadion Woudestein; Attendance: 4,275; Referee: Makkelie

18 February 2017 23	Twente	1–0	Heerenveen	Enschede
18:30 GMT	Klich 54' (pen.)	Report		Stadium: De Grolsch Veste; Attendance: 25,100; Referee: Gözübüyük

24 February 2017 24	ADO Den Haag	1–1	Twente	The Hague
20:00 GMT	Schaken 12'	Report	Ünal 26'	Stadium: Kyocera Stadion; Attendance: 11,615; Referee: Blom

4 March 2017 25	Twente	2–1	Willem II	Enschede
18:30 GMT	Lachman 27' (o.g.); Ünal 27'	Report	Croux 70'	Stadium: De Grolsch Veste; Attendance: 25,900; Referee: Kamphuis

12 March 2017 26	Ajax	3–0	Twente	Amsterdam
16:45 GMT	Younes 55'; Dolberg 67', 90+1'	Report		Stadium: Amsterdam Arena; Attendance: 51,583; Referee: Makkelie

17 March 2017 27	Roda JC	0–3	Twente	Kerkrade
20:00 GMT		Report	Jensen 30', 43'; Ünal 77'	Stadium: Parkstad Limburg Stadion; Attendance: 13,221; Referee: Bax

2 April 2017 28	Twente	1–2	Go Ahead Eagles	Enschede
16:45 GMT	Ünal 45'	Report	Hendriks 53'; Ritzmaier 66'	Stadium: De Grolsch Veste; Attendance: 26,500; Referee: Janssen

6 April 2017 29	Twente	2–2	PSV	Enschede
20:45 GMT	Ünal 8'; Celina 90+2'	Report	Locadia 17'; Moreno 51'	Stadium: De Grolsch Veste; Attendance: 25,300; Referee: Gözübüyük

15 April 2017 30	Twente	3–0	NEC	Enschede
20:45 GMT	Ünal 12', 90+2'; Jensen 58'	Report		Stadium: De Grolsch Veste; Attendance: 25,100; Referee: Blom

22 April 2017 31	AZ	2–1	Twente	Alkmaar
19:45 GMT	Bijen 81' (o.g.); Friday 90+2'	Report	Andersen 65'	Stadium: AFAS Stadion; Attendance: 25,100; Referee: Blom

7 May 2017 32	Sparta	1–0	Twente	Rotterdam
14:30 GMT	Pušić 66'	Report		Stadium: Het Kasteel; Attendance: 10,101; Referee: Janssen

14 May 2017 33	Twente	3–5	Groningen	Enschede
14:30 GMT	George 19'; Klich 64' (pen.); Ünal 85'	Report	Linssen 2'; Idrissi 25', 29'; Thesker 43' (o.g.); Sørloth 66'	Stadium: De Grolsch Veste; Attendance: 26,200; Referee: van Boekel

Last updated: 28 May 2017

=== KNVB Cup ===
22 September 2016 First round	Twente	1–3	Utrecht	Enschede
18:30	Ünal 54'	Report	Zivkovic 18', 90+3'; Haller 88'	Stadium: De Grolsch Veste; Attendance: 22,000; Referee: Serdar Gözübüyük

Last updated: 23 September 2016

== Statistics ==
=== Appearances and goals ===
As of 28 May 2017

No.	Pos	Nat	Player	Total		Eredivisie		KNVB Cup	
No.	Pos	Nat	Player	Apps	Goals	Apps	Goals	Apps	Goals
1	GK	(Netherlands) NED	Nick Marsman	35	0	34	0	1	0
2	DF	(Netherlands) NED	Hidde ter Avest	32	1	31	1	1	0
3	DF	(Denmark) DEN	Joachim Andersen	22	2	22	2	0	0
5	DF	(Germany) GER	Stefan Thesker	30	0	29	0	1	0
6	DF	(Slovenia) SLO	Dejan Trajkovski	23	0	22	0	1	0
7	MF	(Germany) GER	Chinedu Ede	22	0	21	0	1	0
8	MF	(Morocco) MAR	Oussama Assaidi	5	1	5	1	0	0
10	MF	(Kosovo) KOS	Bersant Celina	28	5	27	5	1	0
11	FW	(Belgium) BEL	Dylan Seys	17	1	17	1	0	0
12	FW	(Germany) GER	Tim Hölscher	5	0	5	0	0	0
16	GK	(Netherlands) NED	Joël Drommel	0	0	0	0	0	0
17	FW	(Turkey) TUR	Enes Ünal	33	19	32	18	1	1
18	FW	(Ghana) GHA	Yaw Yeboah	27	2	26	2	1	0
19	FW	(Finland) FIN	Fredrik Jensen	26	4	25	4	1	0
20	GK	(Netherlands) NED	Sonny Stevens	0	0	0	0	0	0
21	MF	(Netherlands) NED	Kyle Ebecilio	0	0	0	0	0	0
22	MF	(South Africa) RSA	Kamohelo Mokotjo	33	1	33	1	0	0
23	MF	(Netherlands) NED	Jelle van der Heyden	11	0	10	0	1	0
25	DF	(Netherlands) NED	Peet Bijen	27	0	26	0	1	0
27	FW	(Germany) GER	Enis Bunjaki	4	0	4	0	0	0
28	DF	(Netherlands) NED	Jeroen van der Lely	27	0	27	0	0	0
30	FW	(Netherlands) NED	Dylan George	8	1	8	1	0	0
35	GK	(Netherlands) NED	Nick Hengelman	0	0	0	0	0	0
43	MF	(Poland) POL	Mateusz Klich	30	6	29	6	1	0
Players who left the club during the 2016–17 season
10	MF	(Netherlands) NED	Hakim Ziyech	4	2	4	2	0	0
4	DF	(Greece) GRE	Giorgos Katsikas	4	0	4	0	0	0
24	MF	(Netherlands) NED	Jari Oosterwijk	12	2	11	2	1	0

=== Goalscorers ===
As of 28 May 2017

Rank	Player	Position	Eredivisie	KNVB Cup	Total
1	(Turkey) Enes Ünal	FW	18	1	19
2	(Poland) Mateusz Klich	CM	6	0	6
3	(Kosovo) Bersant Celina	AM	5	0	5
4	(Finland) Fredrik Jensen	FW	4	0	4
5	(Morocco) Hakim Ziyech	AM	2	0	2
6	(Netherlands) Jari Oosterwijk	FW	2	0	2
7	(Ghana) Yaw Yeboah	FW	2	0	2
8	(Denmark) Joachim Andersen	CB	2	0	2
9	(South Africa) Kamohelo Mokotjo	CM	1	0	1
10	(Netherlands) Hidde ter Avest	RB	1	0	1
11	(Morocco) Oussama Assaidi	FW	1	0	1
12	(Belgium) Dylan Seys	FW	1	0	1
13	(Netherlands) Dylan George	FW	1	0	1
Own goals			3	0	3
Total			49	1	50
