= 2019–20 FC Twente season =

FC Twente
2019–20 season
- Chairman: René Takens
- Head coach: Gonzalo García
- Stadium: De Grolsch Veste
- Eredivisie: 14th
- KNVB Cup: Second round
- Top goalscorer: League: Haris Vučkić (11); All: Haris Vučkić (11)
Home colours	Away colours	Third colours

The 2019–20 season was FC Twente's 55th season in existence and the club's first season back in the top flight of Dutch football. It covered a period from 1 July 2019 to 30 June 2020. They participated in the Eredivisie and the KNVB Cup.

== Players ==
=== Current squad ===
As of 20 September 2019

Note: Flags indicate national team as defined under FIFA eligibility rules; some limited exceptions apply. Players may hold more than one non-FIFA nationality.

No.	Pos.	Nation	Player
2	DF	NED	Paul Verhaegh
3	DF	NED	Xandro Schenk
4	DF	NED	Calvin Verdonk (on loan from Feyenoord)
5	DF	ESP	Julio Pleguezuelo
6	MF	NED	Wout Brama (captain)
7	FW	ESP	Aitor
8	MF	ESP	Javi Espinosa
10	MF	SLO	Haris Vučkić
11	FW	NED	Queensy Menig
12	DF	ESP	José Matos (on loan from Cádiz)
13	FW	JPN	Keito Nakamura (on loan from Gamba Osaka)
14	MF	NOR	Rafik Zekhnini (on loan from Fiorentina)

No.	Pos.	Nation	Player
15	FW	DEN	Emil Berggreen
16	GK	NED	Joël Drommel
17	MF	GER	Tim Hölscher
18	MF	ALB	Lindon Selahi
19	DF	JAM	Joel Latibeaudiere (on loan from Manchester City)
20	MF	ESP	Oriol Busquets (on loan from Barcelona)
21	MF	GEO	Giorgi Aburjania (on loan from Sevilla)
22	GK	NED	Jeffrey de Lange
25	DF	NED	Peet Bijen
26	GK	BEL	Jorn Brondeel
29	MF	NED	Godfried Roemeratoe

== Pre-season and friendlies ==
Win Draw Loss

5 July 2019 Friendly	Twente (Netherlands)	0–0	(United Arab Emirates) Al Wahda	Enschede, Netherlands
15:00 CEST (UTC+2)				Stadium: Sportpark de Zweede

20 July 2019 Friendly	Twente (Netherlands)	0–0	(Belgium) Oud-Heverlee Leuven	Goor, Netherlands
14:30 CEST (UTC+2)				Stadium: Sportpark Heeckeren

23 July 2019 Friendly	Twente (Netherlands)	1–1	(Germany) Schalke 04	Enschede, Netherlands
19:00 CEST (UTC+2)	Laukart 79'		Firat 82'	Stadium: De Grolsch Veste; Attendance: 19,000

28 July 2019 Friendly	Twente (Netherlands)	1–0	(Turkey) Konyaspor	Fleringen, Netherlands
15:00 CEST (UTC+2)	Espinosa 48'			Stadium: Sportpark ’t Reuvekamp

7 January 2020 Friendly	Twente (Netherlands)	1–1	(Germany) Fortuna Düsseldorf	Coín, Spain
16:00 CET (UTC+1)	Hölscher 87'		Skrzybski 43'	Stadium: Estadio Jose Burgos Quintana

== Competitions ==
=== Overview ===
Competition	First match	Last match	Starting round	Final position	Record							
Competition	First match	Last match	Starting round	Final position	Pld	W	D	L	GF	GA	GD	Win %
Eredivisie	3 August 2019	10 May 2020	Matchday 1	14th	26	7	6	13	34	46	−12	26.92
KNVB Cup	30 October 2019	17 December 2019	First round	Second round	2	1	0	1	4	5	−1	50.00
Total					28	8	6	14	38	51	−13	28.57

Source: Soccerway

=== Eredivisie ===
==== League table ====
Pos	Team	Pld	W	D	L	GF	GA	GD	Pts
12	FC Emmen	26	9	5	12	32	45	−13	32
13	VVV-Venlo	26	8	4	14	24	51	−27	28
14	FC Twente	26	7	6	13	34	46	−12	27
15	PEC Zwolle	26	7	5	14	37	55	−18	26
16	Fortuna Sittard	26	6	8	12	29	52	−23	26

Source: eredivisie.nl
Rules for classification: Season in progress: 1) Most points won; 2) Less points lost; 3) Goal difference; 4) Goals scored; 5) Alphabetical order; End of season: 1) Points; 2) Goal difference; 3) Goals scored; 4) Head-to-head points; 5) Head-to-head goal difference; 6) Head-to-head away goals scored; 7) Play-off if relevant for deciding champion, relegation or participating in a European league, otherwise by draw. 8) Penalty shoot-out (only after a play-off)

==== Results summary ====
Overall								Home						Away					
Pld	W	D	L	GF	GA	GD	Pts	W	D	L	GF	GA	GD	W	D	L	GF	GA	GD
26	7	6	13	34	46	−12	27	5	3	5	23	22	+1	2	3	8	11	24	−13

Source: Eredivisie

==== Results by round ====
Round	1	2	3	4	5	6	7	8	9	10	11	12	13	14	15	16	17	18	19	20	21	22	23	24	25	26	27	28	29	30	31	32	33	34
Ground	H	A	H	A	H	A	H	A	A	H	H	A	H	A	H	A	H	A	H	A	H	A	H	A	H	A	A	H	A	H	A	H	A	H
Result	D	W	D	D	W	W	L	L	L	L	W	L	W	L	L	D	L	L	D	D	W	L	W	L	L	L	C	C	C	C	C	C	C	C
Position	11	6	8	8	5	4	5	8	11	12	9	12	11	12	12	12	12	12	13	13	12	13	12	13	14	14	14	14	14	14	14	14	14	14

Source: Eredivisie
A = Away; H = Home; W = Win; D = Draw; L = Loss

==== Matches ====
The Eredivisie schedule was announced on 14 June 2019. The 2019–20 season was abandoned on 24 April 2020, due to the coronavirus pandemic in the Netherlands.

3 August 2019 1	Twente	1–1	PSV	Enschede
20:45 CEST (UTC+2)	Nakamura 8'; Pleguezuelo (yellow card) 89'	Report	Dumfries 65', (yellow card) 76'	Stadium: De Grolsch Veste; Attendance: 27,200; Referee: Serdar Gözübüyük

10 August 2019 2	Groningen	1–3	Twente	Groningen
18:30 CEST (UTC+2)		Report		Stadium: Euroborg; Attendance: 19,049; Referee: Christiaan Bax

18 August 2019 3	Twente	3–3	RKC Waalwijk	Enschede
14:30 CEST (UTC+2)		Report		Stadium: De Grolsch Veste; Attendance: 25,700; Referee: Martin Pérez

24 August 2019 4	Heerenveen	0–0	Twente	Heerenveen
20:45 CEST (UTC+2)		Report		Stadium: Abe Lenstra Stadion; Attendance: 16,328; Referee: Pol van Boekel

1 September 2019 5	Twente	3–1	Utrecht	Enschede
12:15 CEST (UTC+2)		Report		Stadium: De Grolsch Veste; Attendance: 25,500; Referee: Jeroen Manschot

15 September 2019 6	Fortuna Sittard	2–3	Twente	Sittard
16:45 CEST (UTC+2)		Report		Stadium: Fortuna Sittard Stadion; Attendance: 7,377; Referee: Dennis Higler

20 September 2019 7	Twente	2–3	Heracles Almelo	Enschede
20:00 CEST (UTC+2)		Report		Stadium: De Grolsch Veste; Attendance: 29,300; Referee: Jochem Kamphuis

29 September 2019 8	Feyenoord	5–1	Twente	Rotterdam
16:45 CEST (UTC+2)	Berghuis 6'; Larsson 26', 88'; Bijen 55' (o.g.); Sinisterra 67'	Report	Cantalapiedra 23'	Stadium: De Kuip; Attendance: 44,336; Referee: Danny Makkelie

5 October 2019 9	Sparta Rotterdam	2–1	Twente	Rotterdam
19:45 CEST (UTC+2)		Report		Stadium: Sparta Stadion; Attendance: 10,435; Referee: Jeroen Manschot

19 October 2019 10	Twente	0–1	Willem II	Enschede
19:45 CEST (UTC+2)		Report		Stadium: De Grolsch Veste; Attendance: 27,500; Referee: Martin van den Kerkhof

25 October 2019 11	Twente	4–1	Emmen	Enschede
20:00 CEST (UTC+2)		Report		Stadium: De Grolsch Veste; Attendance: 27,400; Referee: Christiaan Bax

2 November 2019 12	AZ	3–0	Twente	The Hague
20:45 CET (UTC+1)	Hatzidiakos 45+2'; De Wit 55'; Boadu 78'	Report		Stadium: Cars Jeans Stadion; Attendance: 4,689; Referee: Danny Makkelie

10 November 2019 13	Twente	2–1	PEC Zwolle	Enschede
14:30 CET (UTC+1)		Report		Stadium: De Grolsch Veste; Attendance: 26,900; Referee: Kevin Blom

24 November 2019 14	VVV-Venlo	2–1	Twente	Venlo
16:45 CET (UTC+1)		Report		Stadium: De Koel; Attendance: 6,730; Referee: Sander van der Eijk

1 December 2019 15	Twente	2–5	Ajax	Enschede
12:15 CET (UTC+1)	Schenk (yellow card) 11'; Nakamura 15'; Aitor 19'; Roemeratoe (yellow card) 50'; Selahi (yellow card) 60'	Report	Lang 32', 51', 70'; Tagliafico (yellow card) 42'; Huntelaar 61', 90+6'; Mazraoui (yellow card) 90'; Marin (yellow card) 90+1'	Stadium: De Grolsch Veste; Attendance: 30,000; Referee: Pol van Boekel

7 December 2019 16	ADO Den Haag	0–0	Twente	The Hague
18:30 CET (UTC+1)		Report		Stadium: Cars Jeans Stadion; Attendance: 11,439; Referee: Siemen Mulder

14 December 2019 17	Twente	0–3	Vitesse	Enschede
20:45 CET (UTC+1)		Report	Linssen 51', 72'; Dicko 61'	Stadium: De Grolsch Veste; Attendance: 26,500; Referee: Allard Lindhout

20 December 2019 18	RKC Waalwijk	3–0	Twente	Waalwijk
20:00 CET (UTC+1)	Tahiri 12'; Bilate (yellow card) 37'; Spierings 47', 60'	Report	Verdonk (red card) 82'	Stadium: Mandemakers Stadion; Attendance: 5,154; Referee: Martin van den Kerkhof

18 January 2020 19	Twente	0–0	Groningen	Enschede
19:45 CET (UTC+1)	Aitor (yellow card) 38'; Troupée (yellow card) 58'; Vučkić (yellow card) 74'	Report	Zeefuik (yellow card) 38'; Hrustic (yellow card) 76'	Stadium: De Grolsch Veste; Attendance: 26,500; Referee: Dennis Higler

26 January 2020 20	PSV	1–1	Twente	Eindhoven
16:45 CET (UTC+1)	Gakpo (yellow card) 58'; Dumfries 61'; Afellay (yellow card) 64' (yellow-red card) 75'; Hendrix (yellow card) 90+4'	Report	Selahi (yellow card) 30'; Espinosa (yellow card) 63'; Vučkić 87'	Stadium: Philips Stadion; Attendance: 33,600; Referee: Siemen Mulder

1 February 2020 21	Twente	2–0	Sparta Rotterdam	Enschede
19:45 CET (UTC+1)	Aitor (yellow card) 26'; Pleguezuelo (yellow card) 59'; Bijen 80'; Lang 90'; Menig (yellow card) 90+3'	Report	Rayhi (yellow card) 38' (yellow-red card) 87'; Piroe (yellow card) 66'; Pinto (yellow card) 81'	Stadium: De Grolsch Veste; Attendance: 26,300; Referee: Jochem Kamphuis

11 February 2020 22	Emmen	2–0	Twente	Emmen
18:30 CET (UTC+1)	Frei 40'; Heylen (yellow card) 52'; Jansen 90+3'	Report	Selahi (yellow card) 28'; Espinosa (yellow card) 38'; Busquets (yellow card) 62'; Aburjania (yellow card) 84'; Lang (yellow card) 87'	Stadium: De Oude Meerdijk; Attendance: 8,039; Referee: Christiaan Bax

15 February 2020 23	Twente	2–0	AZ	Enschede
18:30 CET (UTC+1)	Aburjania 25'; Menig 30'; Busquets (yellow card) 65'	Report	Idrissi (yellow card) 38'	Stadium: De Grolsch Veste; Attendance: 27,300; Referee: Allard Lindhout

23 February 2020 24	Utrecht	2–1	Twente	Utrecht
12:15 CET (UTC+1)	Klaiber (yellow card) 23'; Van der Maarel (yellow card) 79'; Kerk 83'; Arweiler 86'	Report	Selahi (yellow card) 31'; Vučkić 70'; Verdonk (yellow card) 90+2'	Stadium: Stadion Galgenwaard; Attendance: 18,491; Referee: Jeroen Manschot

29 February 2020 25	Twente	2–3	Heerenveen	Enschede
20:45 CET (UTC+1)	Vučkić 65' (pen.); Selahi 72'	Report	Faik 4'; Ejuke 48'; Veerman 55'; Bednarek (yellow card) 64'	Stadium: De Grolsch Veste; Attendance: 27,000; Referee: Joey Kooij

7 March 2020 26	Vitesse	1–0	Twente	Arnhem
19:45 CET (UTC+1)	Tronstad (yellow card) 8'; Bazoer (yellow card) 11'; Grot 70'; Linssen (yellow card) 81'	Report	Selahi (yellow card) 48'; Bijen (yellow card) 71'; Menig (yellow card) 79'	Stadium: GelreDome; Attendance: 14,210; Referee: Richard Martens

15 March 2020 27	Ajax	Cancelled	Twente	Amsterdam
20:00 CET (UTC+1)				Stadium: Johan Cruyff Arena
Note: Match was initially scheduled for 15 March, but cancelled due to the COVID-19 pandemic in the Netherlands.

21 March 2020 28	Twente	Cancelled	ADO Den Haag	Enschede
18:30 CET (UTC+1)				Stadium: De Grolsch Veste
Note: Match was initially scheduled for 21 March, but cancelled due to the COVID-19 pandemic in the Netherlands.

5 April 2020 29	Twente	Cancelled	Fortuna Sittard	Enschede
16:45 CEST (UTC+2)				Stadium: De Grolsch Veste
Note: Match was initially scheduled for 5 April, but cancelled due to the COVID-19 pandemic in the Netherlands.

12 April 2020 30	PEC Zwolle	Cancelled	Twente	Zwolle
16:45 CEST (UTC+2)				Stadium: MAC³PARK Stadion
Note: Match was initially scheduled for 12 April, but cancelled due to the COVID-19 pandemic in the Netherlands.

23 April 2020 31	Twente	Cancelled	VVV-Venlo	Enschede
19:15 CEST (UTC+2)				Stadium: De Grolsch Veste
Note: Match was initially scheduled for 23 April, but cancelled due to the COVID-19 pandemic in the Netherlands.

26 April 2020 32	Heracles Almelo	Cancelled	Twente	Almelo
18:30 CEST (UTC+2)				Stadium: Polman Stadion
Note: Match was initially scheduled for 26 April, but cancelled due to the COVID-19 pandemic in the Netherlands.

3 May 2020 33	Twente	Cancelled	Feyenoord	Enschede
18:30 CEST (UTC+2)				Stadium: De Grolsch Veste
Note: Match was initially scheduled for 3 May, but cancelled due to the COVID-19 pandemic in the Netherlands.

10 May 2020 34	Willem II	Cancelled	Twente	Tilburg
18:30 CEST (UTC+2)				Stadium: Koning Willem II Stadion
Note: Match was initially scheduled for 10 May, but cancelled due to the COVID-19 pandemic in the Netherlands.

=== KNVB Cup ===
30 October 2019 First round	De Treffers	0–2	Twente	Groesbeek
19:45 CET (UTC+1)		Report	Nakamura 16', 22'	Stadium: Sportpark Zuid; Attendance: 2,200; Referee: Joey Kooij

17 December 2019 Second round	Twente	2–5	Go Ahead Eagles	Enschede
18:30 CET (UTC+1)	Aitor 31' (pen.); Bijen 47'	Report	Rabillard 8', 85'; Veldmate 14' (pen.); Berden 69'; Van der Venne 77'	Stadium: De Grolsch Veste; Attendance: 20,400; Referee: Jeroen Manschot

== Statistics ==
=== Appearances and goals ===
No.	Pos	Nat	Player	Total		Eredivisie		KNVB Cup	
No.	Pos	Nat	Player	Apps	Goals	Apps	Goals	Apps	Goals
Goalkeepers
16	GK	(Netherlands) NED	Joël Drommel	27	0	25	0	2	0
22	GK	(Netherlands) NED	Jeffrey de Lange	0	0	0	0	0	0
26	GK	(Belgium) BEL	Jorn Brondeel	2	0	1+1	0	0	0
Defenders
2	DF	(Netherlands) NED	Paul Verhaegh	8	0	5+2	0	1	0
3	DF	(Netherlands) NED	Xandro Schenk	23	0	22	0	1	0
4	DF	(Netherlands) NED	Calvin Verdonk	24	1	22	1	1+1	0
5	DF	(Spain) ESP	Julio Pleguezuelo	20	0	16+3	0	1	0
12	DF	(Spain) ESP	José Matos	2	0	2	0	0	0
19	DF	(England) ENG	Joel Latibeaudiere	6	1	5	1	1	0
25	DF	(Netherlands) NED	Peet Bijen	21	2	18+2	1	1	1
28	DF	(Netherlands) NED	Giovanni Troupée	8	0	8	0	0	0
Midfielders
6	MF	(Netherlands) NED	Wout Brama	11	0	6+3	0	2	0
8	MF	(Spain) ESP	Javier Espinosa	20	1	18+1	1	0+1	0
10	MF	(Slovenia) SLO	Haris Vučkić	26	11	23+2	11	0+1	0
14	MF	(Norway) NOR	Rafik Zekhnini	22	1	5+16	1	1	0
17	MF	(Germany) GER	Tim Hölscher	0	0	0	0	0	0
18	MF	(Albania) ALB	Lindon Selahi	26	2	23+2	2	1	0
20	MF	(Spain) ESP	Oriol Busquets	23	0	20+1	0	2	0
21	MF	(Georgia (country)) GEO	Giorgi Aburjania	19	2	5+12	2	2	0
27	MF	(Netherlands) NED	Noa Lang	7	1	7	1	0	0
29	MF	(Netherlands) NED	Godfried Roemeratoe	16	0	12+3	0	1	0
31	MF	(Netherlands) NED	Ramiz Larbi Zerrouki	1	0	0	0	0+1	0
32	MF	(Netherlands) NED	Jesse Bosch	5	0	3+1	0	0+1	0
Forwards
7	FW	(Spain) ESP	Aitor	22	8	21	7	1	1
11	FW	(Netherlands) NED	Queensy Menig	13	1	4+7	1	1+1	0
13	FW	(Japan) JPN	Keito Nakamura	18	6	13+4	4	1	2
15	FW	(Denmark) DEN	Emil Berggreen	15	1	2+11	1	2	0
Players transferred out during the season

Last updated: 7 March 2020
