= Matthew Smith (footballer, born 1999) =

Wales international footballer (born 1999)

Personal information
- Full name: Matthew Robert Smith
- Date of birth: 22 November 1999 (age 26)
- Place of birth: Redditch, England
- Height: 1.75 m (5 ft 9 in)
- Position: Midfielder

Team information
- Current team: Newport County
- Number: 8

Youth career
- –2013: West Bromwich Albion
- 2013–2018: Manchester City

Senior career*
| Years | Team | Apps | (Gls) |
| 2018–2022 | Manchester City | 0 | (0) |
| 2018–2019 | → Twente (loan) | 34 | (2) |
| 2019–2020 | → Queens Park Rangers (loan) | 8 | (0) |
| 2020 | → Charlton Athletic (loan) | 2 | (0) |
| 2020–2021 | → Doncaster Rovers (loan) | 40 | (1) |
| 2021–2022 | → Hull City (loan) | 9 | (0) |
| 2022–2023 | Milton Keynes Dons | 25 | (2) |
| 2023–2025 | St Johnstone | 54 | (1) |
| 2025– | Newport County | 31 | (0) |

International career^{‡}
| 2015–2016 | Wales U17 | 10 | (0) |
| 2016 | Wales U19 | 3 | (0) |
| 2017 | Wales U21 | 5 | (1) |
| 2018–2022 | Wales | 19 | (0) |
- * Club domestic league appearances and goals as of 14:50, 21 November 2026 (UTC) ‡ National team caps and goals as of 21:29, 22 September 2022 (UTC)

Matthew Robert Smith (born 22 November 1999) is a professional footballer who plays as a midfielder for EFL League Two club Newport County.

== Club career ==
=== Manchester City ===
Having initially joined the academy of West Bromwich Albion at a young age, in 2013 Smith moved to the academy of Manchester City, where he progressed through several age groups.

In July 2018 at the age of 18, Smith joined Dutch Eerste Divisie club FC Twente on a season-long loan, eventually making 37 appearances and scoring 2 goals, playing a key role in the club's promotion to the Eredivisie. Over the next two seasons, he was again sent out on loan to EFL Championship clubs Queens Park Rangers and Charlton Athletic, as well as EFL League One club Doncaster Rovers, making over 40 appearances for the latter. Ahead of the 2021–22 season, on 6 August 2021 Smith joined EFL Championship club Hull City on another season-long loan.

=== Milton Keynes Dons ===
On 31 January 2022, following limited opportunities with Hull, Smith was recalled from his loan and immediately transferred to League One club Milton Keynes Dons on a permanent deal for an undisclosed fee. He made his debut for the club on 8 February 2022, in a 1–1 draw away to Fleetwood Town.

=== St. Johnstone ===
In August 2023 Smith joined Scottish Premiership club St Johnstone on a two-year contract. On 5 January 2025 he was substituted by St Johnstone manager Simo Valakari within 30 minutes of the start of the Scottish Premiership home defeat to Dundee, with Dundee leading 3–0. Dundee won the match 3–1 and Smith was not selected again for St Johnsone again in the 2024–25 season as St Johnstone were subsequently relegated from the Scottish Premiership under Valakari at the end of that season.

Smith was released by St Johnstone at the end of the 2024–25 season.

=== Newport County ===
Smith signed a two-year deal with Newport County in June 2025. He made his debut for Newport in the EFL Cup preliminary round win against Barnet on 29 July 2025.

== International career ==
Smith qualifies for the Wales national team through his grandfather who is from Blackwood, Wales.

Smith has played for Wales at U17, U19, U21 and senior level, often captaining the side at youth level. He received a first call-up to the senior squad on 20 May 2018.

He made his senior debut for Wales in a friendly 0–0 tie with Mexico, replacing Tom Lawrence after 81 minutes. In May 2021 he was selected for the Wales squad for the delayed UEFA Euro 2020 tournament. In November 2022 he was named in the Wales squad for the 2022 FIFA World Cup in Qatar.

== Career statistics ==
=== Club ===
As of 1 July 2025

Appearances and goals by club, season and competition
| Club | Season | League | | | National cup | | League cup | | Other | | Total | |
| Club | Season | Division | Apps | Goals | Apps | Goals | Apps | Goals | Apps | Goals | Apps | Goals |
|---|---|---|---|---|---|---|---|---|---|---|---|---|
| Manchester City | 2018–19 | Premier League | 0 | 0 | 0 | 0 | 0 | 0 | 0 | 0 | 0 | 0 |
| Manchester City | 2019–20 | Premier League | 0 | 0 | 0 | 0 | 0 | 0 | 0 | 0 | 0 | 0 |
| Manchester City | 2020–21 | Premier League | 0 | 0 | 0 | 0 | 0 | 0 | 0 | 0 | 0 | 0 |
| Manchester City | 2021–22 | Premier League | 0 | 0 | 0 | 0 | 0 | 0 | 0 | 0 | 0 | 0 |
| Manchester City | Total | | 0 | 0 | 0 | 0 | 0 | 0 | 0 | 0 | 0 | 0 |
| FC Twente (loan) | 2018–19 | Eerste Divisie | 34 | 2 | 3 | 0 | — | | — | | 37 | 2 |
| Queens Park Rangers (loan) | 2019–20 | Championship | 8 | 0 | 0 | 0 | 2 | 0 | — | | 10 | 0 |
| Charlton Athletic (loan) | 2019–20 | Championship | 2 | 0 | — | | — | | — | | 2 | 0 |
| Doncaster Rovers (loan) | 2020–21 | League One | 40 | 1 | 3 | 0 | — | | 0 | 0 | 43 | 1 |
| Hull City (loan) | 2021–22 | Championship | 9 | 0 | 0 | 0 | 1 | 0 | — | | 10 | 0 |
| Milton Keynes Dons | 2021–22 | League One | 4 | 0 | — | | — | | — | | 4 | 0 |
| Milton Keynes Dons | 2022–23 | League One | 21 | 2 | 0 | 0 | 3 | 0 | 3 (Note: One appearance in the EFL Trophy) | 0 | 27 | 2 |
| Milton Keynes Dons | Total | | 25 | 2 | 0 | 0 | 3 | 0 | 3 | 0 | 31 | 2 |
| St Johnstone | 2023–24 | Scottish Premiership | 34 | 1 | 1 | 0 | 0 | 0 | 0 | 0 | 35 | 1 |
| St Johnstone | 2024–25 | Scottish Premiership | 20 | 0 | 0 | 0 | 5 | 0 | 0 | 0 | 25 | 0 |
| St Johnstone | Total | | 54 | 1 | 1 | 0 | 5 | 0 | 0 | 0 | 60 | 1 |
| Career total | | | 172 | 5 | 7 | 0 | 11 | 0 | 3 | 0 | 193 | 6 |

=== International ===
As of 22 September 2022

Appearances and goals by national team and year
| National team | Year | Apps | Goals |
|---|---|---|---|
| Wales | 2018 | 4 | 0 |
| Wales | 2019 | 3 | 0 |
| Wales | 2020 | 5 | 0 |
| Wales | 2021 | 3 | 0 |
| Wales | 2022 | 4 | 0 |
| Total | | 19 | 0 |

== Honours ==
FC Twente

- Eerste Divisie: 2018–19
