= Bersant Celina =

Kosovan footballer (born 1996)

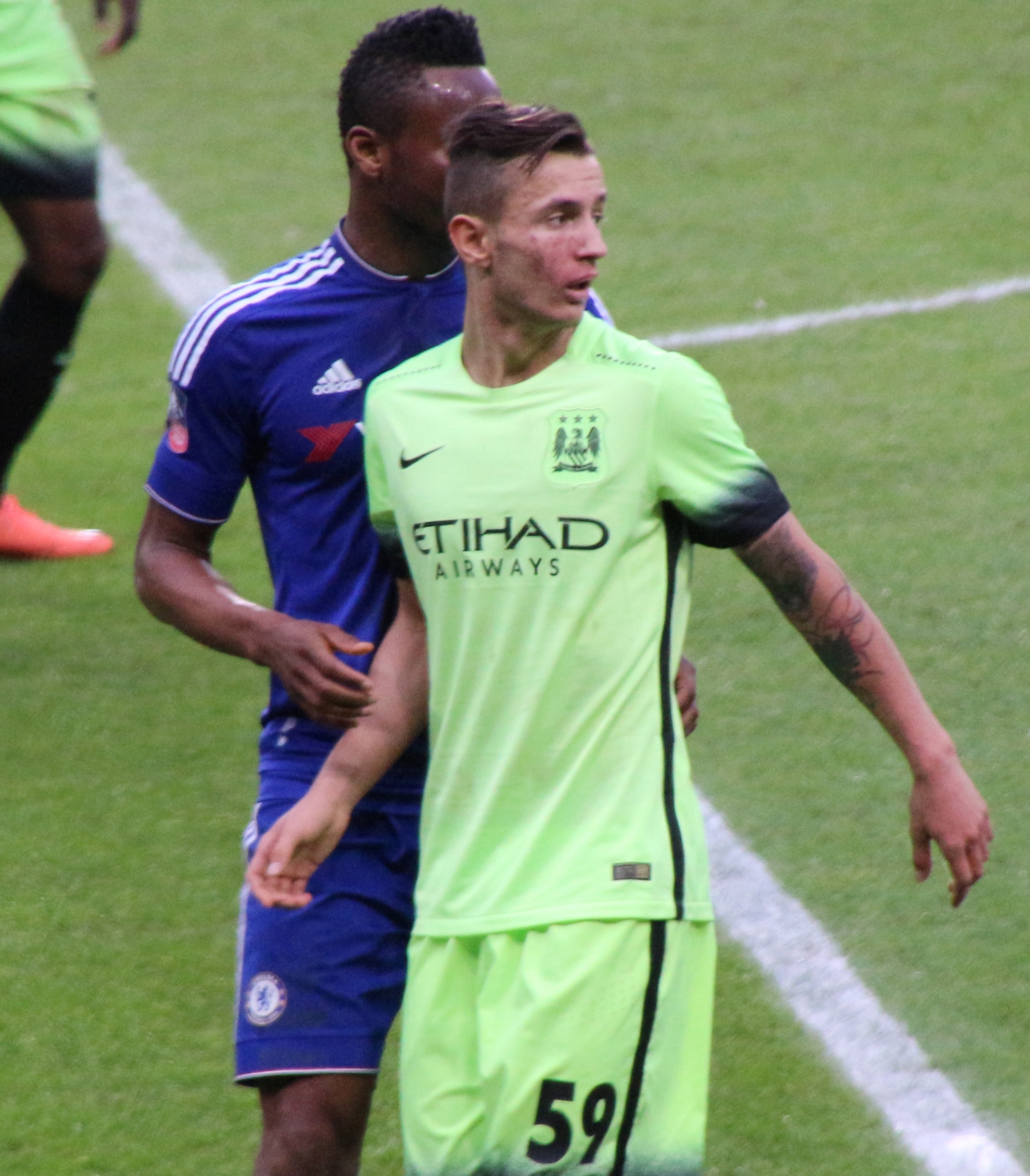
- Celina playing for Manchester City in 2016

Personal information
- Date of birth: 9 September 1996 (age 30)
- Place of birth: Prizren, FR Yugoslavia
- Height: 1.81 m (5 ft 11 in)
- Positions: Attacking midfielder; wide midfielder

Team information
- Current team: Al-Ettifaq
- Number: 43

Youth career
- 2007–2012: Strømsgodset
- 2012–2014: Manchester City

Senior career*
Years	Team	Apps	(Gls)
2014–2018	Manchester City	1	(0)
2016–2017	→ Twente (loan)	27	(5)
2017–2018	→ Ipswich Town (loan)	35	(7)
2018–2020	Swansea City	73	(7)
2020–2024	Dijon	32	(0)
2021–2022	→ Ipswich Town (loan)	32	(6)
2022–2023	→ Kasımpaşa (loan)	18	(1)
2023	→ Stoke City (loan)	6	(0)
2023	→ AIK (loan)	9	(0)
2024–2026	AIK	68	(11)
2026–	Al-Ettifaq	11	(3)

International career
2011–2012	Norway U15	4	(0)
2012–2013	Norway U16	3	(0)
2013–2014	Norway U17	8	(0)
2014	Norway U21	1	(0)
2013–2017	Kosovo U21	4	(0)
2014–2024	Kosovo	38	(2)
- * Club domestic league appearances and goals as of 24 October 2026

Bersant Celina (born 9 September 1996) is a Kosovan professional footballer who plays as an attacking midfielder or wide midfielder for Saudi Pro League club Al-Ettifaq.

He began his professional career with Manchester City, having previously been with the youth system at Strømsgodset. He made his senior debut for Manchester City in 2016, going on to have loan spells at Twente and Ipswich Town during his time at the club. He signed for Swansea City in 2018. He spent two seasons at Swansea before joining French side Dijon in 2020.

Born in FR Yugoslavia, Celina was raised in Norway. After representing both Norway and Kosovo at youth level, he made his senior international debut for the Kosovo national team in 2014.

== Club career ==
=== Early career ===
Celina grew up in Drammen, Norway, where he moved to as a refugee, with his family, at the age of two after leaving his native Kosovo to escape the ongoing war in the country. He started his youth career at Strømsgodset in Norway.

=== Manchester City ===
In 2012, he was offered a scholarship from the Manchester City Reserves and Academy in England, where he spent the next two years as a scholar.

On 1 July 2014, Celina signed a three-year professional contract with Manchester City. At the time, Celina was injured and had a surgery; after returning from injury, he remained with the youth team whilst rehabilitating.

In late December 2014, Celina was called up to the first team by head coach Manuel Pellegrini due to the busy Christmas schedule that saw Manchester City play four games in just over a week. Celina was not selected in the 18-man squad for the three matches in the Premier League, but in the fourth match valid for the third round of FA Cup against Sheffield Wednesday on 4 January 2015, he made the matchday squad. Celina remained on the bench for the entire match, which finished with a 2–1 comeback victory for City.

On 19 January 2015, Celina was selected to take part in the first-team squad's mid-season Abu Dhabi training camp along with three other Manchester City academy players. He was included along with Brandon Barker, George Evans and Thierry Ambrose from Patrick Vieira's Elite Development Squad for the trip to the Middle East. Celina made his first senior appearance for City as a substitute for Edin Džeko in a friendly against German side Hamburger SV.

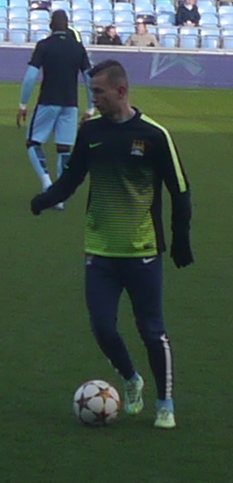
Celina warming up for Manchester City in 2015

Celina made his official debut for the first team on 9 January 2016 in the FA Cup tie against Norwich City, coming on as an 85th-minute substitute in a 3–0 away win. Later he also made his first Premier League appearance by playing as a substitute in a 3–1 home defeat against Leicester City on 6 February, assisting Sergio Agüero for Manchester City's only goal and becoming the first Kosovar to play in England’s top tier. On 21 February, he made his first appearance in Manchester City's starting XI in an FA Cup fifth round match against Chelsea at Stamford Bridge. Celina made 4 appearances for Manchester City during his first season in senior football.

==== Loan to Twente ====
On 25 August 2016, Celina joined Eredivisie side FC Twente, on a season-long loan. He made his debut on 10 September, as a 67th-minute substitute, scoring his first goal for the club in a 1–3 loss against SC Heerenveen. He went on to score in his next two appearances against ADO Den Haag and Vitesse. On 29 January 2017, Celina was sent off with a red card at 49 minutes, in a match against PEC Zwolle. On 6 April, Celina scored his 5th goal for Twente in stoppage time, to save a 2–2 draw with PSV. He scored 5 goals in 28 appearances for Twente over the course of the season. Following the 2016–17 campaign Celina signed a new three-year deal with Manchester City.

==== Loan to Ipswich Town ====
On 3 July 2017, Celina joined Championship side Ipswich Town, on a season-long loan. He made his debut for Ipswich on 8 August in a 2–0 EFL Cup first-round win against Luton Town. On 22 August 2017, he scored his first goal for Ipswich in an EFL Cup second-round tie against Crystal Palace. He scored his first league goal for Ipswich in a 1–2 loss against Queens Park Rangers on 9 September. On 28 October, Celina came off the bench to score an 89th-minute winner in a 2–1 away win against Burton Albion, netting a free-kick from 25 yards. He also scored in the following two matches against Cardiff City and Preston North End. On 13 January, Celina scored a stunning long-range goal from 30-yards out in a 1–0 home win against Leeds United at Portman Road. He made 40 appearances for Ipswich during the 2017–18 season, scoring 8 goals, with his long-range effort against Leeds United earning him the club's Goal of the Season award.

=== Swansea City ===
On 31 July 2018, Celina signed for EFL Championship side Swansea City for a reported fee of £3 million with a further £1 million to follow in performance-based bonuses. One day later, the club confirmed that Celina had joined on a permanent transfer after agreeing to a four-year deal. On 4 August, he made his debut in a 2–1 away win against Sheffield United after being named in the starting line-up. He scored his first goal for the Swans in a 2–3 loss against his former club Ipswich Town on 6 October. On 13 March 2019, Celina was mocked in a 0–3 loss at West Bromwich Albion for slipping over while taking a penalty. Three days later, he scored in the quarter-finals of the FA Cup to give Swansea a 2–0 half time lead over his former club Manchester City at the Liberty Stadium, though they eventually lost the match 2–3. He made 42 appearances for Swansea during his first season at the club, scoring 8 goals. His FA Cup quarter-final strike against Manchester City won him the club's Goal of the Season award for the 2018–19 season.

Celina continued to feature regularly for Swansea during the 2019–20 season, making his first appearance of the season on the opening match day, starting in a 2–1 home win against Hull City. He scored his first goal of the season on 21 August in a 3–1 away win against Queens Park Rangers. Celina also scored in the following match in a 3–0 win against Birmingham City. Celina scored twice in 37 appearances during the season, helping Swansea reach the EFL Championship play-offs following a 6th-placed finish. He came off the bench in the play-off semi-final second-leg away against Brentford, in which Swansea lost 1–3, resulting in a 2–3 aggregate loss.

=== Dijon ===
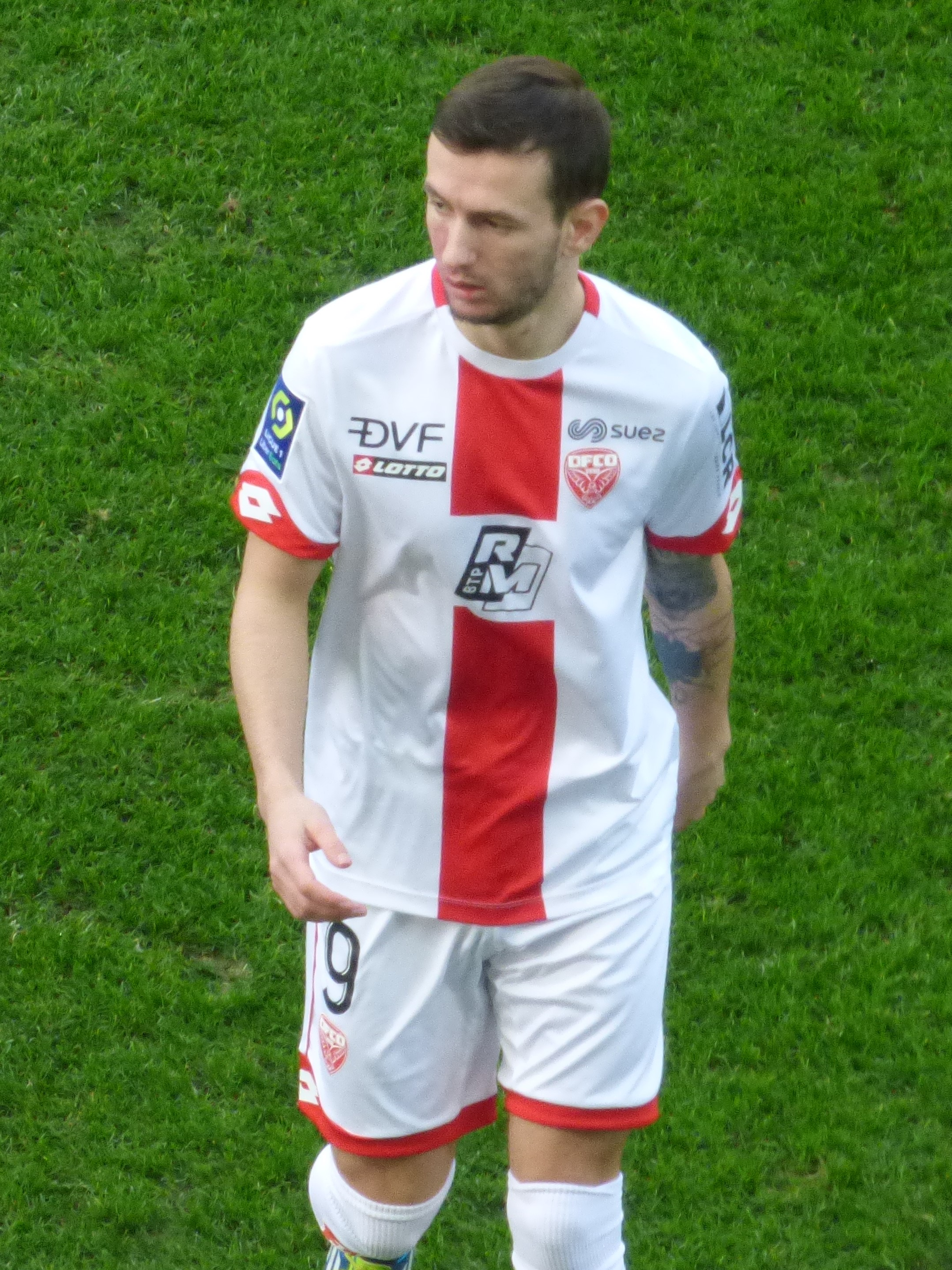
Celina playing for Dijon in 2021

On 9 September 2020, Celina joined Ligue 1 club Dijon. He penned a four-year contract with the club and was given the number 9 shirt. He made his debut for the club 4 days later, coming on as a substitute in a 0–2 loss to Stade Brest. Celina went on to make 33 appearances in all competitions that season, providing 5 assists without scoring, with Dijon being relegated to Ligue 2 after finishing 20th.

==== Return to Ipswich Town (loan) ====
On 31 August 2021, Celina returned to Ipswich Town on a season-long loan. Ipswich had attempted to do a deal earlier in the summer, however the move was put on hold due to a heart condition Celina suffered from after contracting COVID-19. After Celina was cleared to return to training, Ipswich were able to complete the deal. He received the squad number 43. Eighteen days after signing for the club, he made his debut in a 1–0 away win against Lincoln City after being named in the starting line-up. He scored his first goal since returning to Ipswich on 23 October, scoring a 93rd-minute winner in a 2–1 home win against Fleetwood Town at Portman Road. Celina scored his 2nd and 3rd goals of his second spell for Ipswich in a 4–1 win at Wycombe Wanderers 10 days later.

==== Loan to Kasımpaşa ====
On 2 August 2022, Celina moved on loan to Kasımpaşa in Turkey.

==== Loan to Stoke City ====
On 26 January 2023, Celina joined Stoke City on loan for the remainder of the 2022–23 season. Celina struggled for game time at Stoke making six league and two FA Cup appearances of which four were starts.

==== AIK ====
After spending the 2023 season on loan at AIK in Sweden, Celina made a permanent move to the club in January 2024.

== International career ==
=== Norway ===
Celina qualifies to represent Kosovo, Norway and Albania at international level. In his first years at international level, Celina was capped four times for Norway under-15s and three times for the Norway under-16 side.

He was called up to the Norway under-17 team by coach Bård Flovik to participate in the 2013 UEFA European Under-17 Championship. In the opening match of the tournament against Malta on 29 September 2012, Celina was an unused substitute. He started the second match on 1 October against Iceland before being substituted in the 77th minute for Joachim Eriksen. The match finished with a 2–0 victory for Norway. For the last match, against Portugal on 4 October, he was again an unused substitute for the entire match, which finished with a 1–0 win for Norway.

On 25 August 2015, Celina was called up to play for the Norway under-21 side in an U21 European Championship qualifier against England. He made his debut for the U21s as an 87th-minute substitute in the match on 7 September.

=== Kosovo ===
In June 2013, Celina was named as part of the Kosovo U21 squad for the 2013 Valais Youth Cup. On 12 June 2013, he made his debut for the Kosovo U21s in the 2013 Valais Youth Cup semi-final against Ghana U20 after being named in the starting line-up.

As soon as FIFA permitted Kosovo to play sanctioned friendly matches with other FIFA members in March 2014, Celina was called up to the Kosovo squad for their first sanctioned match against Haiti. He was an unused substitute for the match, which finished in a goalless draw.

Celina missed the two upcoming friendlies against Turkey and Senegal in May due to injury, but returned in September 2014 for a match against Oman. He made his senior debut for Kosovo in that match, playing 83 minutes, as Kosovo won 1–0 to record the country's maiden win in senior men's football.

In January 2015, Celina declared that he would turn down a call-up to represent Norway, as he wanted to play for Kosovo. Albert Bunjaki, the head coach of Kosovo declared that he would not be selected to play for Albania despite his holding dual citizenship from Norway and Kosovo.

Celina scored his first goal for Kosovo on 13 November 2015 in a friendly match against Albania at the Pristina City Stadium, becoming at 19 years and 2 months Kosovo’s youngest goalscorer. This record was broken by Edon Zhegrova in 2018.

After making appearances with Kosovo's national side he also appeared once for Norway U21, keeping his options open. However, he all but confirmed his allegiance to Kosovo when he appeared in their first friendly as a FIFA nation, against the Faroe Islands on 3 June 2016. He made his competitive debut for Kosovo against Finland on 5 September 2016 in a 2018 FIFA World Cup qualifier, coming on as a sub in the 66th minute, with the cap tying him to Kosovo, confirming which national team he would represent.

Celina scored his second international goal in a 2–2 friendly draw against Denmark on 21 March 2019.

== Personal life ==
Celina's brothers Behadil and Loti are also professional footballers. On 7 August 2016, Celina was arrested for driving under the influence of alcohol when officers found him behind the wheel in Manchester City Centre at 3.30 am. He was fined £2,625 and banned from driving for one year. He was also ordered to pay £255 in costs.

In February 2022, Celina offered his flat in Drammen, Norway, free of charge, to Ukrainian refugees who had fled their homeland due to the Russian invasion of Ukraine.

== Career statistics ==
=== Club ===
As of match played on 11 August 2024

Appearances and goals by club, season and competition
Club	Season	League			National cup (Note: Includes FA Cup, KNVB Cup, Coupe de France, Turkish Cup, Svenska Cupen)		League cup (Note: Includes EFL Cup)		Other		Total	
Club	Season	Division	Apps	Goals	Apps	Goals	Apps	Goals	Apps	Goals	Apps	Goals
Manchester City	2014–15	Premier League	0	0	0	0	0	0	0	0	0	0
Manchester City	2015–16	Premier League	1	0	3	0	0	0	0	0	4	0
Manchester City	2016–17	Premier League	0	0	0	0	0	0	0	0	0	0
Manchester City	2017–18	Premier League	0	0	0	0	0	0	0	0	0	0
Manchester City	Total		1	0	3	0	0	0	0	0	4	0
Twente (loan)	2016–17	Eredivisie	27	5	1	0	—		—		28	5
Ipswich Town (loan)	2017–18	Championship	35	7	1	0	2	1	—		38	8
Swansea City	2018–19	Championship	38	5	4	3	0	0	—		42	8
Swansea City	2019–20	Championship	35	2	1	0	0	0	1 (Note: Appearance in EFL Championship play-offs)	0	37	2
Swansea City	Total		73	7	5	3	0	0	1	0	79	10
Dijon	2020–21	Ligue 1	32	0	1	0	—		—		33	0
Ipswich Town (loan)	2021–22	League One	32	6	1	0	0	0	2 (Note: Appearances in EFL Trophy)	0	35	6
Kasımpaşa (loan)	2022–23	Süper Lig	18	1	1	0	—		—		19	1
Stoke City (loan)	2022–23	Championship	6	0	2	0	0	0	—		8	0
AIK (loan)	2023	Allsvenskan	9	0	0	0	—		—		9	0
AIK	2024	Allsvenskan	18	3	5	0	—		—		23	3
Career total			251	29	20	3	2	1	3	0	276	33

=== International ===
Appearances and goals by national team and year
National team	Year	Apps	Goals
Kosovo	2014	1	0
Kosovo	2015	1	1
Kosovo	2016	3	0
Kosovo	2017	3	0
Kosovo	2018	3	0
Kosovo	2019	9	1
Kosovo	2020	7	0
Kosovo	2021	4	0
Kosovo	2022	2	0
Kosovo	2023	4	0
Kosovo	2024	1	0
Total		38	2

Kosovo score listed first, score column indicates score after each Celina goal.

International goals by date, venue, cap, opponent, score, result and competition
No.	Date	Venue	Cap	Opponent	Score	Result	Competition
1	13 November 2015	Pristina City Stadium, Pristina, Kosovo	2	Albania	1–1	2–2	Friendly
2	21 March 2019	Fadil Vokrri Stadium, Pristina, Kosovo	12	Denmark	2–1	2–2	Friendly

== Honours ==
Individual

- Ipswich Town Goal of the Season: 2017–18, 2021–22
- Swansea City Goal of the Season: 2018–19
- EFL League One Goal of the Month: November 2021
