= Joël Drommel =

Dutch footballer (born 1996)

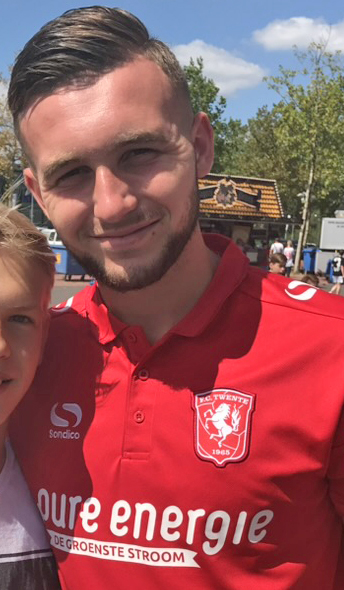
- Drommel with Twente in 2018

Personal information
- Date of birth: 16 November 1996 (age 29)
- Place of birth: Bussum, Netherlands
- Height: 1.92 m (6 ft 4 in)
- Position: Goalkeeper

Team information
- Current team: Twente
- Number: 16

Youth career
- 2010–2011: Almere City
- 2011–2014: IJsselmeervogels
- 2014–2015: Twente

Senior career*
Years	Team	Apps	(Gls)
2015–2017	Jong Twente	18	(0)
2015–2021	Twente	126	(0)
2021–2026	PSV	32	(0)
2023–2025	Jong PSV	7	(0)
2025–2026	→ Sparta (loan)	34	(0)
2026–	Twente	3	(0)

International career
2014–2015	Netherlands U19	7	(0)
2015–2016	Netherlands U20	3	(0)
2016–2018	Netherlands U21	4	(0)
- * Club domestic league appearances and goals as of 25 October 2026

Joël Drommel (born 16 November 1996) is a Dutch professional footballer who plays as a goalkeeper for Eredivisie club Twente.

== Club career ==
Drommel used to play as a midfielder, but turned goalkeeper before joining the Almere City youth set-up. He then had a season with IJsselmeervogels, before joining FC Twente in 2014. He made his Eredivisie debut on 12 September 2015 against AFC Ajax in a 2–2 draw.

In the 2019–20 and 2020–21 seasons, he appeared in all but one KNVB Cup match. In March 2021, Twente triggered a one-year option in contract. Shortly afterwards, Drommel was sold to PSV for €3.5 million, signing a five-year contract effective from the 2021–22 season.

Drommel played a major role in PSV's 2022–23 KNVB Cup campaign, featuring in all five cup matches and saving Edson Álvarez's penalty in PSV's penalty shoot-out win over Ajax in the final.

In 2025, Drommel was sent out on a season-long loan to fellow Eredivisie side Sparta Rotterdam. During his season in Rotterdam, he kept a league-high eleven clean sheets, earning himself a place in ESPN's Eredivisie Team of the Season.

Drommel departed PSV and returned to Twente in the summer of 2026, signing a four-year contract at the Grolsch Veste.

== International career ==
Drommel was called up to the senior Netherlands squad in November 2020.

== Personal life ==
His father Piet-Jan Drommel played for AZ and SC Telstar.

== Career statistics ==
As of match played 25 October 2026

Appearances and goals by club, season and competition
Club	Season	League			KNVB Cup		Continental		Other		Total	
Club	Season	Division	Apps	Goals	Apps	Goals	Apps	Goals	Apps	Goals	Apps	Goals
Jong Twente	2014–15	Eerste Divisie	4	0	—		—		—		4	0
Jong Twente	2016–17	Tweede Divisie	12	0	—		—		—		12	0
Jong Twente	2017–18	Derde Divisie	2	0	—		—		—		2	0
Jong Twente	Total		18	0	—		—		—		18	0
FC Twente	2015–16	Eredivisie	12	0	1	0	—		—		13	0
FC Twente	2016–17	Eredivisie	0	0	0	0	—		—		0	0
FC Twente	2017–18	Eredivisie	18	0	3	0	—		—		21	0
FC Twente	2018–19	Eerste Divisie	36	0	4	0	—		—		40	0
FC Twente	2019–20	Eredivisie	26	0	2	0	—		—		28	0
FC Twente	2020–21	Eredivisie	34	0	0	0	—		—		34	0
FC Twente	Total		126	0	10	0	—		—		136	0
PSV	2021–22	Eredivisie	26	0	4	0	16 (Note: Six appearances in UEFA Champions League, six appearances in UEFA Europa League, four appearances in UEFA Conference League)	0	1 (Note: Appearance in Johan Cruyff Shield)	0	47	0
PSV	2022–23	Eredivisie	4	0	5	0	1 (Note: Appearance in UEFA Europa League)	0	0	0	10	0
PSV	2023–24	Eredivisie	1	0	2	0	0	0	0	0	3	0
PSV	2024–25	Eredivisie	1	0	4	0	1 (Note: Appearances in UEFA Champions League)	0	0	0	6	0
PSV	Total		32	0	15	0	18	0	1	0	66	0
Jong PSV	2022–23	Eerste Divisie	1	0	—		—		—		1	0
Jong PSV	2023–24	Eerste Divisie	3	0	—		—		—		3	0
Jong PSV	2024–25	Eerste Divisie	3	0	—		—		—		3	0
Jong PSV	Total		7	0	—		—		—		7	0
Sparta Rotterdam (loan)	2025–26	Eredivisie	34	0	0	0	—		—		34	0
Twente	2026–27	Eredivisie	3	0	0	0	3 (Note: Appearances in UEFA Conference League)	0	—		6	0
Career total			220	0	25	0	21	0	1	0	267	0

== Honours ==
PSV

- Eredivisie: 2024–25
- KNVB Cup: 2021–22, 2022–23
- Johan Cruyff Shield: 2021, 2022, 2023
