= Nacho Monsalve =

Spanish footballer

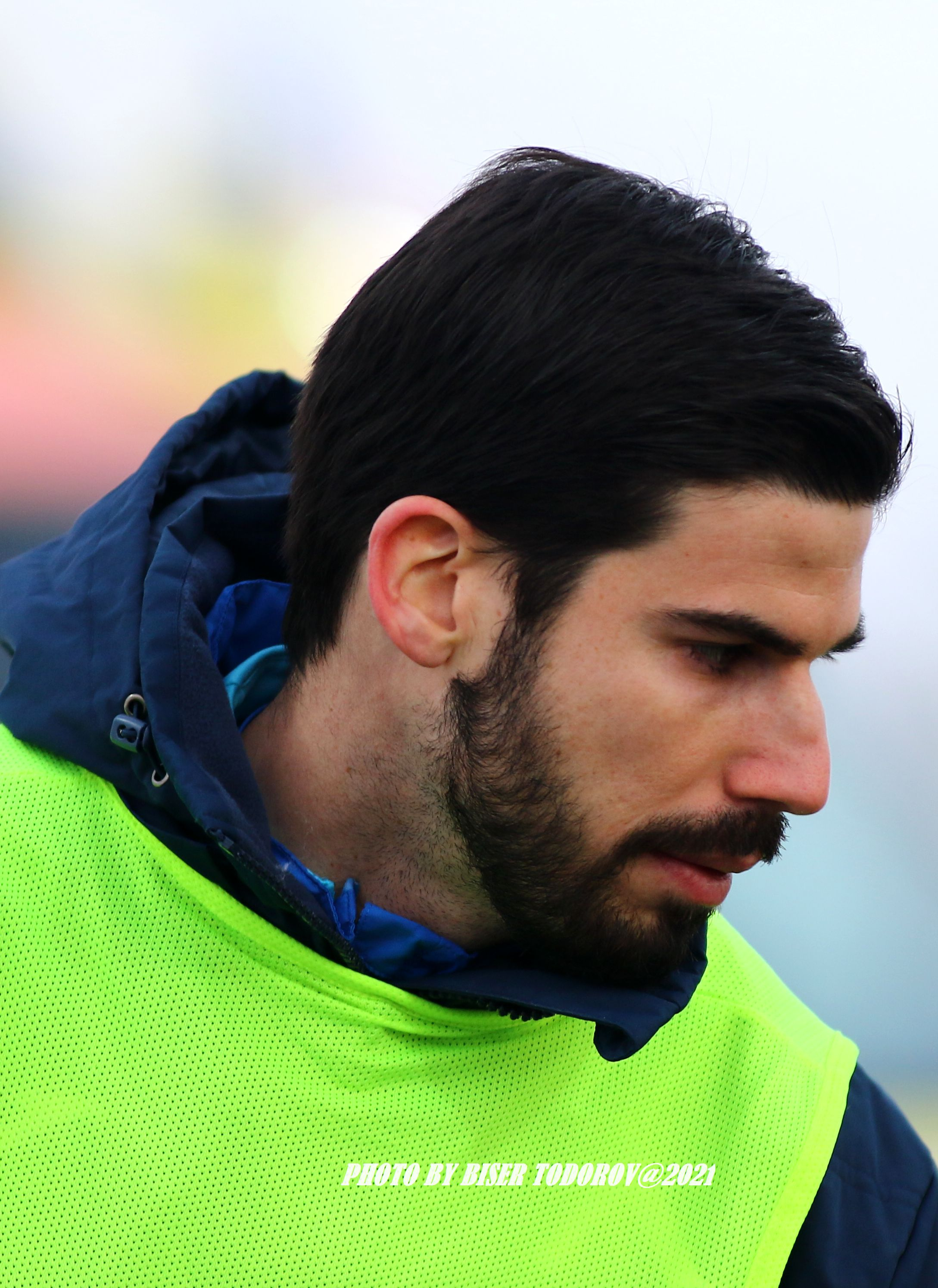

Personal information
- Full name: Ignacio Monsalve Vicente
- Date of birth: 27 April 1994 (age 32)
- Place of birth: Madrid, Spain
- Height: 1.88 m (6 ft 2 in)
- Position: Centre back

Team information
- Current team: East Bengal

Youth career
- 2006–2013: Atlético Madrid

Senior career*
Years	Team	Apps	(Gls)
2013–2014	Atlético Madrid C	22	(2)
2014–2016	Atlético Madrid B	52	(6)
2015–2016	Atlético Madrid	12	(0)
2016–2017	Deportivo de La Coruña B	36	(2)
2017–2018	Rayo Vallecano	32	(4)
2017–2018	Recreativo	38	(2)
2018–2019	Twente	26	(4)
2019–2020	NAC Breda	36	(2)
2020–2021	Levski Sofia	32	(4)
2021–2024	ŁKS Łódź	62	(6)
2024–2025	Eldense	28	(4)
2025–2026	Hércules	22	(2)
2026–	East Bengal	0	(0)
- * Club domestic league appearances and goals as of 10 June 2026

Ignacio "Nacho" Monsalve Vicente (born 27 April 1994) is a Spanish professional footballer who plays as a central defender for Indian Super League club East Bengal.

== Club career ==
Born in Madrid, Monsalve joined Atlético Madrid's youth setup in 2006, aged 12. He made his debut as a senior with the C-team in the 2013–14 campaign, in Tercera División.

Monsalve was promoted to the reserves in June 2014, also making the pre-season with the first team. In March 2016, after the injuries of Diego Godín, José Giménez and Stefan Savić, he was promoted to the main squad.

On 2 April 2016, Monsalve made his professional debut, starting in a 5–1 La Liga home routing over Real Betis. On 19 July he moved to another reserve team, Deportivo de La Coruña B also in the fourth level.

On 24 August 2017, Monsalve signed for Segunda División side Rayo Vallecano, being immediately loaned to Recreativo de Huelva in Segunda División B for one year.

On 3 August 2018, Monsalve moved abroad for the first time in his career, signing for FC Twente in the Dutch Eerste Divisie. After one season with the Tukkers, he signed with NAC Breda from the same country.

On 27 January 2021, Monsalve switched teams and countries again, joining Levski Sofia in Bulgaria. On 22 June, he completed his move to Polish I liga club ŁKS Łódź on a three-year contract.

Monsalve made 13 Ekstraklasa appearances in the 2023–24 season before returning to Spain on 4 January 2024, signing a half-year deal with CD Eldense. On 8 July 2025, after suffering relegation, he moved to Hércules CF in Primera Federación on a one-year contract.

== Honours ==
ŁKS Łódź

- I liga: 2022–23
