= Tom Boere =

Dutch footballer (born 1992)

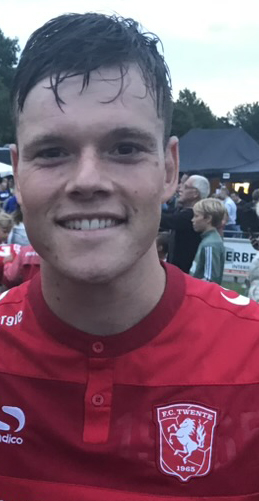

Personal information
- Date of birth: 24 November 1992 (age 33)
- Place of birth: Breda, Netherlands
- Height: 1.83 m (6 ft 0 in)
- Position: Striker

Youth career
- 1997–1999: VV Terneuzen
- 1999–2006: Gent
- 2006–2011: Ajax

Senior career*
Years	Team	Apps	(Gls)
2012–2014	Gent	3	(0)
2013–2014	→ Hoogstraten (loan)	21	(6)
2014–2016	Eindhoven	50	(12)
2016–2017	FC Oss	38	(33)
2017–2019	Twente	63	(21)
2019–2020	KFC Uerdingen 05	21	(9)
2020–2021	Türkgücü München	9	(2)
2021–2021	SV Meppen	19	(2)
2021–2023	Cambuur	35	(6)
2023–2025	NAC Breda	38	(5)
2025	Terrassa	15	(3)
2025–2026	Lokeren	19	(0)
2026	HSV Hoek	9	(2)

International career
2009	Netherlands U17	3	(1)
- * Club domestic league appearances and goals as of 13:32, 19 November 2026 (UTC)

Tom Boere (born 24 November 1992) is a Dutch professional footballer who plays as a striker.

== Club career ==
=== Early years ===
Born in Breda, Netherlands, Tom Boere grew up in Terneuzen and began his footballing career in Ghent, Belgium, playing in the youth teams of KAA Gent as a striker, before being recruited by Ajax to join their youth team. Having served as a striker for the Jong Ajax team, Boere made his debut and only appearance for the senior side for Ajax in the 2011–12 season, in a friendly match against Go Ahead Eagles from Deventer on 10 November 2011. He scored the last goal in a 3–1 home win having come on as 70th-minute substitute for Dmitri Bulykin. He made no appearances in a regular season or cup match for the senior squad, and subsequently transferred to Gent as a free transfer in the winter transfer window.

=== Gent ===
Boere returned to Gent, where he spent much of his youth career, during the winter transfer window of the 2011–12 season on a free transfer from Ajax. He made his senior debut in Belgium coming on as an 86th-minute substitute for Rafinha in the home match against Zulte Waregem on 21 January 2012, a 0–0 draw. During the 2013–14 season, he played on loan for Hoogstraten in the Belgian Second Division.

=== Eindhoven and Oss ===
In June 2014, Boere signed a three-year deal with Dutch Eerste Divisie side FC Eindhoven. He moved to FC Oss in summer 2016. He managed to score 33 goals in 38 appearances for the club, winning the 2016–17 Eerste Divisie Golden Boot.

=== Twente ===
In June 2017, Boere signed a three-year contract with Twente, who had finished seventh in the Eredivisie the year before. He was set to be the replacement of Enes Ünal, who had left after his loan deal expired.

=== Türkgücü ===
On 27 July 2020, Boere joined Türkgücü München. His coach Alexander Schmidt initially utilised him next to the consistently efficient Petar Slišković in the centre of attack. After three goals in seven games, Sercan Sararer was briefly moved forward from the attacking midfield before Mounir Bouziane, another newcomer, finally removed the Dutchman completely from seeing the field.

=== SV Meppen ===
After the investor of Türkgücü Munich, Hasan Kivran, announced his withdrawal at the end of December 2020 and thus left the future of the club in uncertainty, 28-year-old Boere moved to league rivals SV Meppen in early-January 2021 – a team which had scored the sixth fewest goals in the league at the time. He signed a contract until the end of the season. He made his debut for the club on 9 January in a 1–0 win over 1. FC Saarbrücken, playing the entire match. On 19 February, Boere scored his first goal for the club which secured a 2–1 home win over Hallescher FC. Earlier in the match, he had provided an assist to Hassan Amin.

=== Cambuur ===
In 2021, Boere joined Cambuur.

=== NAC Breda ===
In January 2023, Boere joined NAC Breda on a two-and-a-half-year deal.

=== Terrassa ===
On 7 January 2025, Boere signed with Terrassa in the Spanish fourth tier.

=== Lokeren ===
For the 2025–26 season, Boere moved to Lokeren in the Belgian Challenger Pro League.

== Honours ==
Twente

- Eerste Divisie: 2018–19
