= Jelle van der Heyden =

Dutch footballer (born 1995)

Personal information
- Full name: Jelle van der Heyden
- Date of birth: 31 August 1995 (age 31)
- Place of birth: Arnhem, Netherlands
- Height: 1.80 m (5 ft 11 in)
- Position: Midfielder

Team information
- Current team: IFK Mariehamn
- Number: 23

Youth career
- –2006: Koninklijke UD
- 2006–2008: Go Ahead Eagles
- 2008–2014: Twente

Senior career*
Years	Team	Apps	(Gls)
2014–2019	Jong Twente	44	(0)
2014–2019	Twente	53	(1)
2019–2023	Vendsyssel	88	(0)
2023	IFK Mariehamn	14	(2)
2024	B36 Tórshavn	22	(1)
2025–	IFK Mariehamn	36	(1)

International career
2009	Netherlands U15	2	(0)
2015	Netherlands U21	3	(0)
- * Club domestic league appearances and goals as of 13 November 2026

Jelle van der Heyden (born 31 August 1995) is a Dutch professional footballer who plays as a defensive midfielder for Veikkausliiga club IFK Mariehamn.

== Club career ==
Born in Arnhem but raised in Deventer, van der Heyden started playing football at Koninklijke UD and made his professional debut for Jong Twente in 2014.

=== Vendsyssel FF ===
On the transfer deadline day, 2 September 2019, van der Heyden joined Danish Superliga club Vendsyssel FF after a trial. Van der Heyden left the club at the end of the 2022–23 season.

=== IFK Mariehamn ===
On 18 July 2023, van der Heyden signed a contract with Finnish club IFK Mariehamn, for the rest of 2023 season.

=== B36 Tórshavn ===
On 22 January 2024, van der Heyden signed with Faroese club B36 Tórshavn.

== Career statistics ==
As of 13 November 2026

Appearances and goals by club, season and competition
Club	Season	League			Cup (Note: Includes KNVB Cup, Danish Cup, Suomen Cup and Faroe Islands Cup)		Europe		Total	
Club	Season	Division	Apps	Goals	Apps	Goals	Apps	Goals	Apps	Goals
Jong Twente	2014–15	Eerste Divisie	31	0	–		–		31	0
Jong Twente	2016–17	Tweede Divisie	8	0	–		–		8	0
Jong Twente	2017–18	Derde Divisie	5	0	–		–		5	0
Jong Twente	Total		44	0	0	0	0	0	44	0
Twente	2014–15	Eredivisie	1	0	–		–		1	0
Twente	2015–16	Eredivisie	11	0	1	0	–		12	0
Twente	2016–17	Eredivisie	10	0	1	0	–		11	0
Twente	2017–18	Eredivisie	12	0	1	0	–		13	0
Twente	2018–19	Eerste Divisie	19	1	2	0	–		21	1
Twente	Total		53	1	5	0	0	0	58	1
Vendsyssel	2019–20	Danish 1st Division	19	0	2	0	–		21	0
Vendsyssel	2020–21	Danish 1st Division	28	0	2	0	–		30	0
Vendsyssel	2021–22	Danish 1st Division	31	0	2	1	–		33	1
Vendsyssel	2022–23	Danish 1st Division	9	0	2	0	–		11	0
Vendsyssel	Total		87	0	8	1	0	0	95	1
IFK Mariehamn	2023	Veikkausliiga	14	2	1	0	–		15	2
B36 Tórshavn	2024	Faroe Islands Premier League	22	1	4	0	2 (Note: Appearances in UEFA Conference League)	0	28	1
IFK Mariehamn	2025	Veikkausliiga	16	1	2	0	–		18	1
IFK Mariehamn	2026	Veikkausliiga	20	0	2	0	–		22	0
IFK Mariehamn	Total		36	1	4	0	0	0	40	1
Career total			256	5	22	1	2	0	280	6
