= Jeroen van der Lely =

Dutch footballer

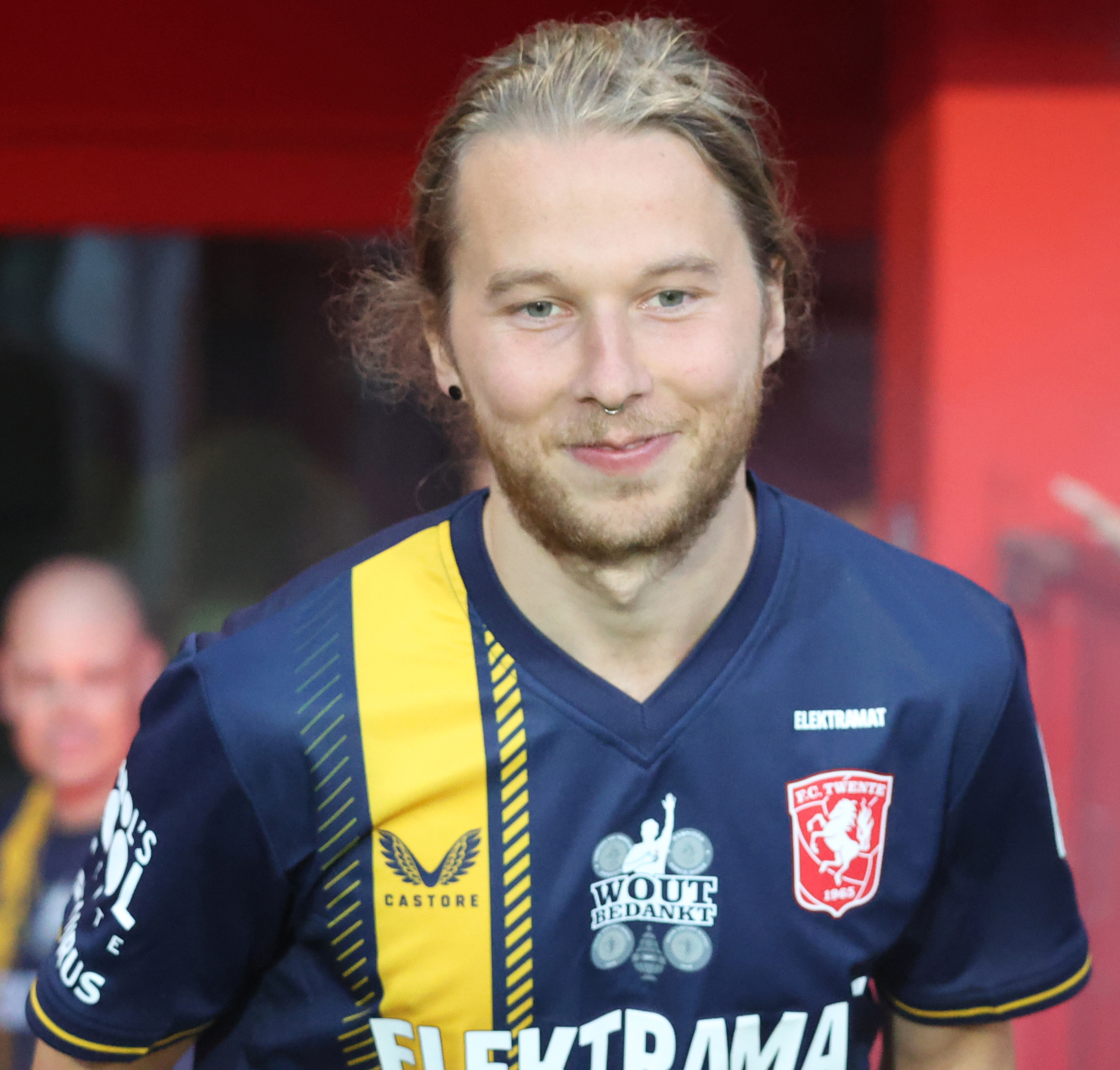

Personal information
- Full name: Jeroen van der Lely
- Date of birth: 4 July 1996 (age 30)
- Place of birth: Nijverdal, Netherlands
- Height: 1.76 m (5 ft 9 in)
- Position: Right back

Youth career
- 200?–2008: RKSV De Zweef
- 2008–2014: Twente

Senior career*
| Years | Team | Apps | (Gls) |
| 2014–2019 | Twente | 72 | (1) |
| 2015–2019 | Jong Twente | 34 | (0) |
| 2019–2020 | Vendsyssel | 7 | (0) |
| 2021– | USV Hercules | | |

International career
| 2015–2016 | Netherlands U20 | 3 | (0) |
- * Club domestic league appearances and goals

Jeroen van der Lely (born 22 March 1996) is a Dutch footballer who plays for USV Hercules as a right back. During his professional career, he played for Twente and Vendsyssel FF.

== Club career ==
Born in Nijverdal, Overijssel, Van der Lely is a youth exponent from FC Twente. He made his Eerste Divisie debut on 23 February 2015 against De Graafschap in a 3–1 home win.

On the transfer deadline day, 2 September 2019, Van der Lely joined Danish second division club Vendsyssel FF after a trial. However, the club announced on 2 January 2020 that they intended to cut down on the number of players, and Van der Lely was one of three players that would be cut.

On 13 May 2020, Van der Lely announced his retirement, citing a lack of motivation and passion for playing professional football. Instead, he opted to study literary science at Utrecht University. In January 2021, he started playing football again on an amateur level with USV Hercules while continuing his studies.

== Honours ==
=== Club ===
Twente

- Eerste Divisie: 2018–19
