= Jari Oosterwijk =

Dutch footballer

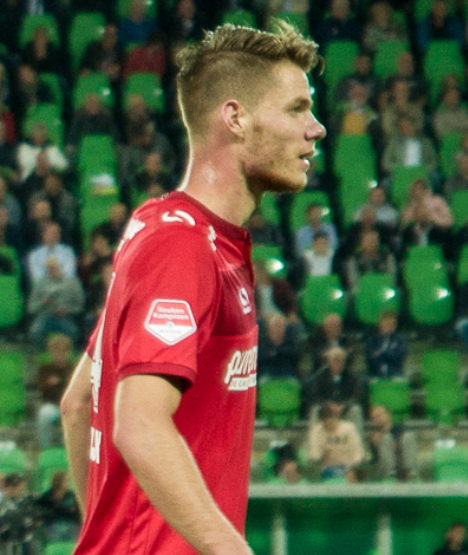
- Oosterwijk in 2018

Personal information
- Date of birth: 3 March 1995 (age 31)
- Place of birth: Lettele, Netherlands
- Height: 1.94 m (6 ft 4 in)
- Position: Forward

Youth career
- VV Lettele
- –2009: Go Ahead Eagles
- 2009–2013: Twente

Senior career*
Years	Team	Apps	(Gls)
2013–2018	Jong Twente	90	(28)
2013–2019	Twente	57	(13)
2017–2018	→ NAC Breda (loan)	10	(3)
2020–2021	VV Lettele		
2021	HHC Hardenberg	8	(0)
Total		165	(44)
- * Club domestic league appearances and goals

Jari Oosterwijk (born 3 March 1995) is a Dutch former professional footballer who plays as a forward.

== Club career ==
Oosterwijk came to FC Twente as a youth player. He attended the club's academy and made his debut in professional football with Jong FC Twente in the Eerste Divisie in 2013. A year later, Oosterwijk played his first game in the main squad of the club, during the game with Vitesse he came on as a substitute. In the 2016–17 season, Oosterwijk played on a loan basis for NAC Breda. Oosterwijk played 57 league matches for FC Twente in which he scored thirteen times.

On 16 September 2019, his contract with Twente was terminated by mutual consent.
