= Jorn Brondeel =

Belgian footballer (born 1993)

Personal information
- Date of birth: 7 September 1993 (age 33)
- Place of birth: Wetteren, Belgium
- Height: 1.88 m (6 ft 2 in)
- Position: Goalkeeper

Team information
- Current team: Lokeren
- Number: 1

Youth career
- 1998–2003: KSC Oosterzele
- 2003–2005: Verbroedering Denderhoutem
- 2005–2008: Sporting Lokeren
- 2008–2011: Zulte Waregem

Senior career*
Years	Team	Apps	(Gls)
2011–2013	Zulte Waregem	0	(0)
2013–2015	Royal Antwerp	14	(0)
2015–2017	Lierse	32	(0)
2016–2017	→ NAC Breda (loan)	37	(0)
2017–2020	Twente	20	(0)
2020–2022	Willem II	13	(0)
2022–2023	Beveren	1	(0)
2023–2026	Eindhoven	82	(0)
2026–	Lokeren	0	(0)
- * Club domestic league appearances and goals as of 26 September 2026

Jorn Brondeel (born 7 September 1993) is a Belgian professional footballer who plays as a goalkeeper for Challenger Pro League club Lokeren.

== Club career ==
On 11 July 2023, Brondeel signed a three-year contract with FC Eindhoven.
