= Dylan Seys =

Belgian footballer (born 1996)

Personal information
- Date of birth: 26 September 1996 (age 30)
- Place of birth: Kortrijk, Belgium
- Height: 1.68 m (5 ft 6 in)
- Position: Winger

Youth career
- 2012–2016: Club Brugge

Senior career*
Years	Team	Apps	(Gls)
2016–2017	Club Brugge	0	(0)
2016	→ Hapoel Acre (loan)	13	(3)
2016–2017	→ FC Twente (loan)	17	(1)
2016–2017	→ Jong FC Twente (loan)	8	(1)
2017–2019	RKC Waalwijk	66	(20)
2020	Royal Excel Mouscron	1	(0)
2020–2021	Excelsior	12	(0)
2021–2022	Helmond Sport	26	(4)
2022–	A.E. Kifisia	0	(0)
- * Club domestic league appearances and goals as of 3 April 2022

Dylan Seys (born 26 September 1996) is a Belgian professional footballer who plays as a winger.

== Career ==
=== Royal Excel Mouscron ===
On 27 January 2020 Seys joined Belgian Belgian First Division A club, Royal Excel Mouscron, on a deal until June 2021 with an option for one further year.

=== Helmond Sport ===
On 26 July 2021, he signed a one-year contract with Helmond Sport.

=== A.E. Kifisia ===
On 14 July 2022, Seys signed with A.E. Kifisia in Greece.
