= Javier Espinosa =

Spanish footballer (born 1992)

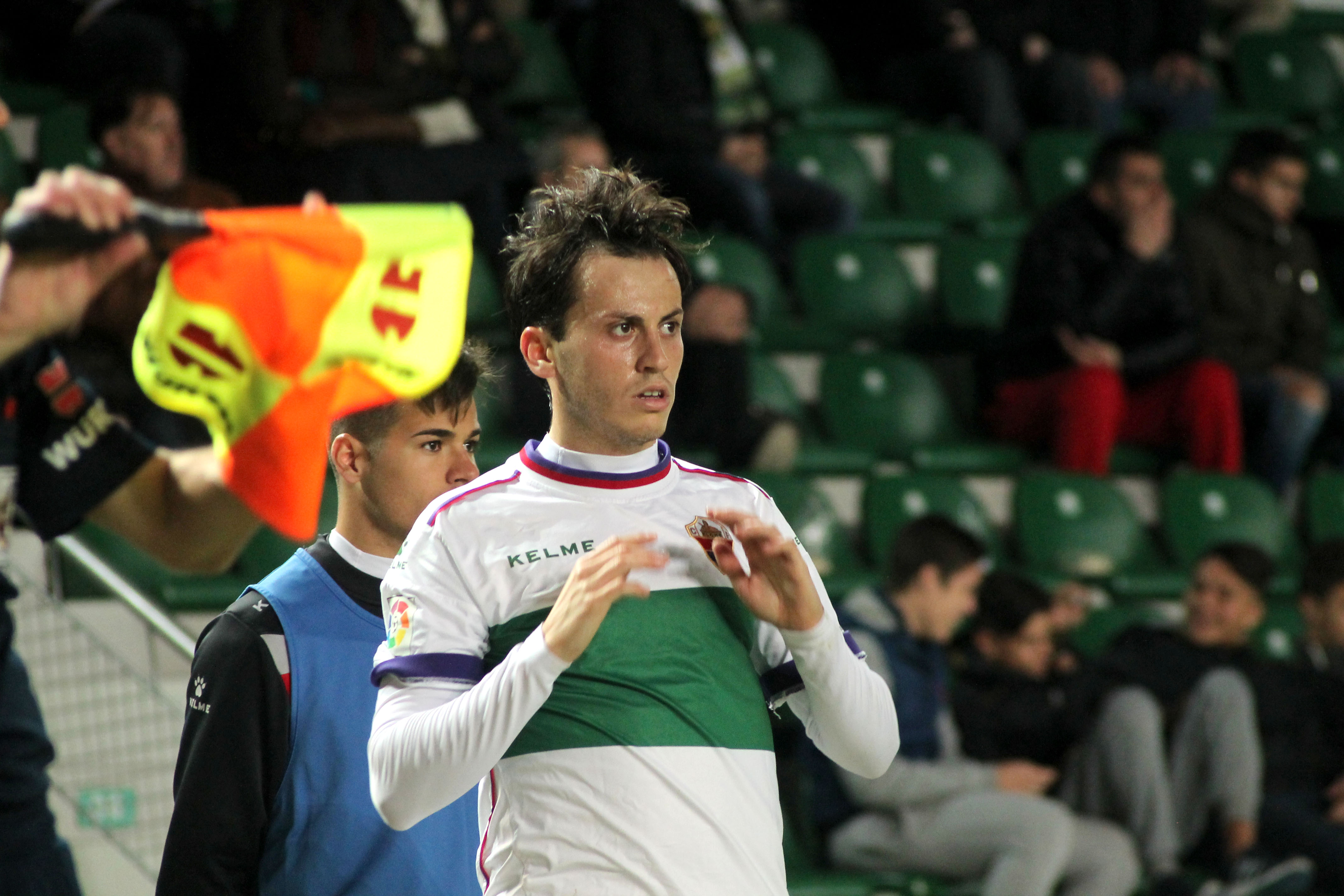
- Espinosa with Elche in 2015

Personal information
- Full name: Javier Espinosa González
- Date of birth: 19 September 1992 (age 34)
- Place of birth: Talavera de la Reina, Spain
- Height: 1.74 m (5 ft 9 in)
- Position: Midfielder

Team information
- Current team: Talavera

Youth career
- 2005–2011: Barcelona

Senior career*
Years	Team	Apps	(Gls)
2010–2014	Barcelona B	101	(14)
2014–2016	Villarreal	6	(1)
2015	→ Almería (loan)	15	(1)
2015–2016	→ Elche (loan)	38	(0)
2016–2018	Levante	27	(0)
2017–2018	→ Granada (loan)	27	(2)
2018–2020	Twente	52	(5)
2021	Fuenlabrada	14	(0)
2021–2023	AEK Larnaca	28	(1)
2026–	Talavera	2	(0)

International career
2009	Spain U17	5	(1)
- * Club domestic league appearances and goals as of 22:44, 20 September 2026 (UTC)

Javier Espinosa González (born 19 September 1992) is a Spanish professional footballer who plays as a central midfielder for Segunda Federación club Talavera de la Reina.

== Club career ==
=== Barcelona B ===
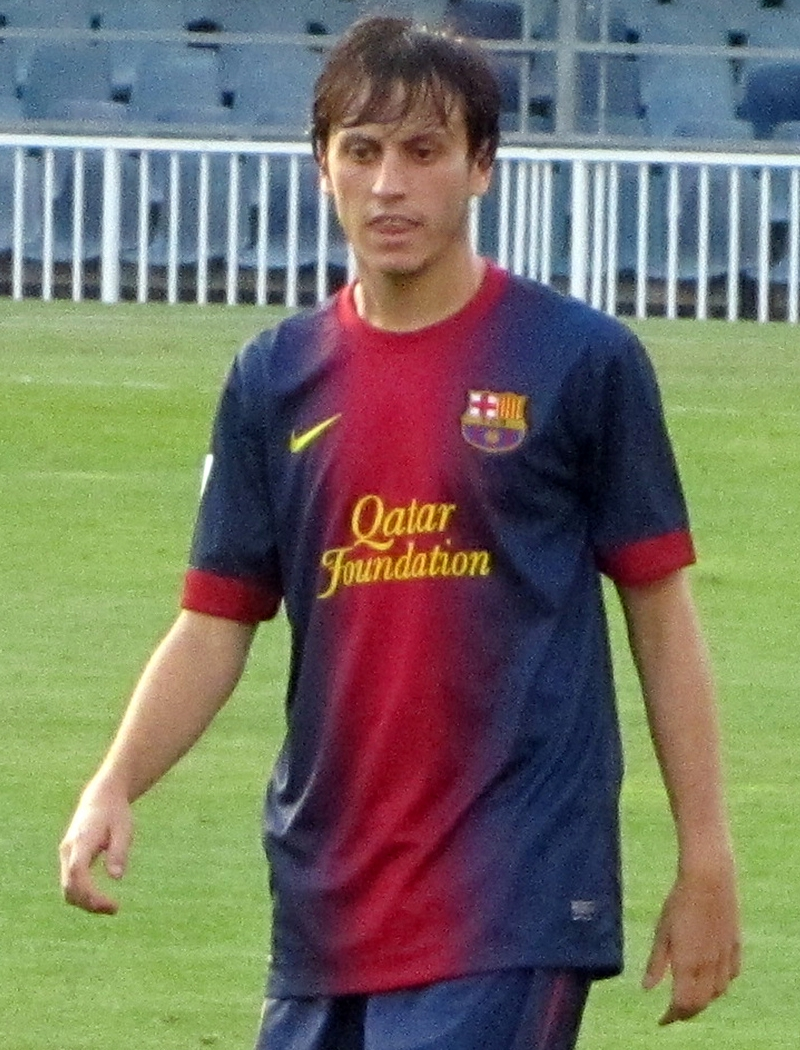
Espinosa playing for Barcelona B in 2012

Born in Talavera de la Reina, Toledo, Castilla–La Mancha, Espinosa moved to FC Barcelona's youth system, La Masia, at the age of 13. On 1 May 2010, whilst still a junior, he made his senior debut with the B team, playing the second half in a 2–1 home win against Valencia CF Mestalla in the Segunda División B. On 26 February of the following year, after replacing fellow youth graduate Albert Dalmau, he contributed one goal to a 6–4 Segunda División away victory over CD Numancia.

Espinosa became a regular fixture under new manager Eusebio Sacristán. He scored five times in 27 games in the 2012–13 season, again spent in the second tier, and continued to appear regularly the following campaign, netting a career-best seven goals as Barça B finished third.

=== Villarreal ===
On 11 July 2014, Espinosa signed a three-year contract with Villarreal CF. He made his debut in La Liga on 24 August, replacing Cani in the 63rd minute of a 2–0 away defeat of Levante UD.

Espinosa scored his first goal in the main division on 21 September, his team's first in a 4–2 home win over Rayo Vallecano. On 9 January 2015, he was loaned to fellow top-flight side UD Almería until June.

On 28 August 2015, Espinosa joined Elche CF of the second division, in a season-long loan.

=== Levante ===
On 19 July 2016, after cutting ties with Villarreal, Espinosa signed a two-year deal with Levante, recently relegated to division two. He helped to achieve promotion at the first attempt, then extended his link until 2019; he was immediately loaned to Granada CF for one year.

Espinosa terminated his contract with the Valencian club on 30 August 2018.

=== Twente ===
On 31 August 2018, Espinosa moved abroad for the first time in his career, signing for FC Twente. He made his debut in the Dutch Eerste Divisie on 8 September, starting in a 1–2 home loss against TOP Oss.

=== Later career ===
On 1 February 2021, Espinosa signed a short-term deal with CF Fuenlabrada back in his country's second tier. In the ensuing summer, he agreed to a two-year contract at AEK Larnaca FC of the Cypriot First Division.

== International career ==
Espinosa was part of the Spanish squad that finished third at the 2009 FIFA U-17 World Cup. He was initially selected for the 2011 UEFA European Under-19 Championship, but withdrew due to injury.

== Career statistics ==
As of 29 May 2016

Club	Season	League		Cup		Europe		Other		Total	
Club	Season	Apps	Goals	Apps	Goals	Apps	Goals	Apps	Goals	Apps	Goals
Barcelona B	2009–10	1	0	—						1	0
Barcelona B	2010–11	4	1	—						4	1
Barcelona B	2011–12	32	1	—						32	1
Barcelona B	2012–13	27	5	—						27	5
Barcelona B	2013–14	37	7	—						37	7
Barcelona B	Total	101	14	0	0	0	0	0	0	101	14
Villarreal	2014–15	6	1	2	0	7	2	—		15	3
Almería	2014–15	15	1	1	0	—				16	1
Elche	2015–16	38	0	1	0	—				39	0
Career totals		160	16	4	0	7	2	0	0	171	18

== Honours ==
Levante

- Segunda División: 2016–17

Twente

- Eerste Divisie: 2018–19

Spain U17

- FIFA U-17 World Cup third place: 2009
