= Tim Hölscher =

German footballer (born 1995)

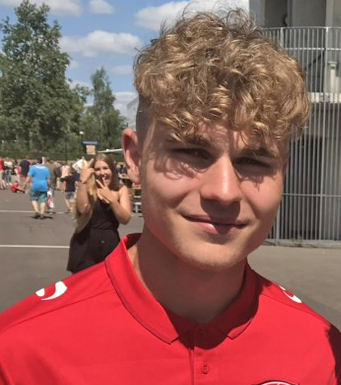

Personal information
- Date of birth: 21 January 1995 (age 31)
- Place of birth: Gronau, North Rhine-Westphalia, Germany
- Height: 1.79 m (5 ft 10 in)
- Position: Attacking midfielder

Team information
- Current team: Eintracht Nordhorn

Youth career
- 2000–2006: SG Gronau
- 2006–2009: Schalke 04
- 2009–2012: Twente

Senior career*
Years	Team	Apps	(Gls)
2012–2017	Twente	36	(0)
2013–2015	→ Jong Twente	55	(13)
2014–2015	→ Chemnitzer FC (loan)	3	(0)
2017–2018	Go Ahead Eagles	12	(0)
2018	Esbjerg	14	(5)
2018–2020	Twente	18	(1)
2021	TOP Oss	4	(0)
2021–2022	Dordrecht	15	(2)
2022–	Eintracht Nordhorn	32	(21)

International career
2012–2013	Germany U18	4	(0)
- * Club domestic league appearances and goals as of 6 May 2022

Tim Hölscher (born 21 February 1995) is a German footballer who plays as an attacking midfielder for Bezirksliga Weser-Ems club Eintracht Nordhorn.

== Career ==
=== Early years ===
Hölscher started playing football at local SG Gronau at the age of three years. There he started out as a goalkeeper, but soon moved to the position of second striker. In 2006, he moved to the youth academy of Schalke 04, where he played in the centre-forward position.

=== Twente ===
In 2009, Dutch Eredivisie club Twente signed Hölscher to their academy. At the age of 17, he was awarded a three-year contract with the Enschede-based club in 2012. He would primarily be used in the second team Jong FC Twente in the 2012–13 season. After he had already completed the pre-season as a possible first-team prospect, he made his competitive debut in the first team on 12 July 2012 in the UEFA Europa League. He came on as a second-half substitute for Wout Brama in the second leg of the first qualifying round at UE Santa Coloma in Andorra. On 25 November 2012, Hölscher made his Eredivisie debut in the match against newly promoted PEC Zwolle. Manager Steve McClaren sent him on the pitch after an hour of play for Edwin Gyasi. He made his first appearance in the starting line-up of Twente on 6 December 2012 in the last game of the Europa League group stage against Helsingborgs IF.

In the last open days of the transfer window in summer 2014, Hölscher signed for German 3. Liga side Chemnitzer FC on one-year loan – despite also having had inquiries by Dutch Eredivisie clubs. The loan spell was terminated earlier on 30 December 2014, as he did not have had a lot prospect of gaining play time for the German side. He returned to Twente to be able to play for Jong FC Twente in the second half of the season.

=== Go Ahead Eagles and Esbjerg ===
For the 2017–18 season, Hölscher moved to the Dutch Eerste Divisie club Go Ahead Eagles. From there, he moved to the Danish Superliga club Esbjerg fB in winter 2017. Although he was utilised in all games there for the first half of 2018, he returned to Twente again in summer 2018.

=== Return to Twente ===
After a groin operation, Hölscher was injured from January 2019 and the rest of the 2018–19 season. In the 2019–20 season, until the premature end of the season due to the effects of the COVID-19 pandemic, he was only part of the matchday squad for six games, but did not actually make an appearance. Instead, he played a total of nine games with the second team. His contract was not renewed at the end of the season.

=== TOP Oss ===
Ahead of the 2020–21 season, Hölscher had not found a new club. On 1 February 2021, he signed a six-month contract with TOP Oss in the Eerste Divisie. He made his debut on 5 February in a 6–0 win over Jong AZ, coming on as a substitute for Lion Kaak in the 69th minute. Partly due to a hamstring injury, he only made four appearances for the club.

=== Dordrecht ===
In July 2021, Hölscher signed with Eerste Divisie club Dordrecht. He made his debut on 6 August, scoring the equaliser to secure a 1–1 home draw against Jong PSV.

=== Later career ===
In August 2022, Hölscher retired from professional football and joined seventh-tier Bezirksliga Weser-Ems club Eintracht Nordhorn. In his first season at the club, he scored 20 goals and provided nine assists in 25 league appearances.
