= Peet Bijen =

Dutch professional footballer (born 1995)

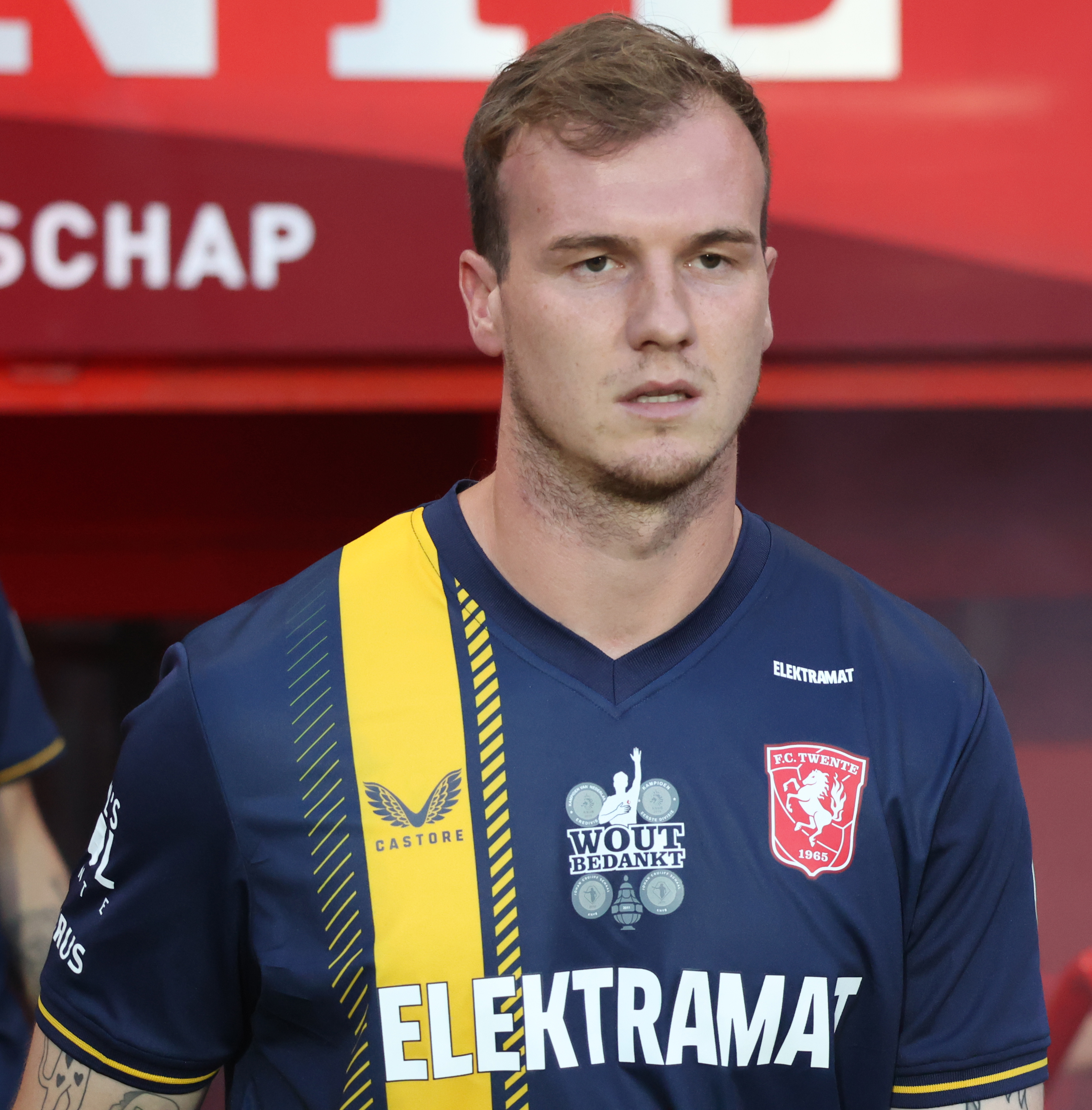

Personal information
- Date of birth: 28 January 1995 (age 31)
- Place of birth: Hengelo, Netherlands
- Height: 1.89 m (6 ft 2 in)
- Position: Centre-back

Youth career
- –2006: KSV BWO
- 2006–2013: FC Twente

Senior career*
| Years | Team | Apps | (Gls) |
| 2013–2015 | Jong FC Twente | 52 | (1) |
| 2013–2020 | FC Twente | 132 | (10) |
| 2020–2021 | ADO Den Haag | 6 | (0) |
| 2021–2022 | Emmen | 1 | (0) |

International career
| 2013 | Netherlands U18 | 1 | (0) |
| 2013 | Netherlands U19 | 1 | (0) |
| 2014 | Netherlands U20 | 4 | (0) |
| 2014–2015 | Netherlands U21 | 4 | (0) |
- * Club domestic league appearances and goals

Peet Bijen (born 28 January 1995) is a Dutch former professional footballer who played as a centre-back. He played for FC Twente, ADO Den Haag and Emmen.

== Club career ==
On 30 August 2021, he signed a one-season contract with Emmen. In August 2022, Bijen announced his retirement from playing due to ankle injury.

== Career statistics ==
As of match played 7 March 2020

Appearances and goals by club, season and competition
| Club | Season | League | | | National Cup | | Other | | Total | |
| Club | Season | Division | Apps | Goals | Apps | Goals | Apps | Goals | Apps | Goals |
|---|---|---|---|---|---|---|---|---|---|---|
| Jong FC Twente | 2013–14 | Eerste Divisie | 18 | 1 | 0 | 0 | 0 | 0 | 18 | 1 |
| Jong FC Twente | 2014–15 | Eerste Divisie | 34 | 0 | 0 | 0 | 0 | 0 | 34 | 0 |
| Jong FC Twente | Total | | 52 | 1 | 0 | 0 | 0 | 0 | 52 | 1 |
| FC Twente | 2014–15 | Eredivisie | 1 | 0 | 0 | 0 | 0 | 0 | 1 | 0 |
| FC Twente | 2015–16 | Eredivisie | 18 | 1 | 1 | 0 | 0 | 0 | 19 | 1 |
| FC Twente | 2016–17 | Eredivisie | 26 | 0 | 1 | 0 | 0 | 0 | 27 | 0 |
| FC Twente | 2017–18 | Eredivisie | 32 | 2 | 5 | 0 | 0 | 0 | 37 | 2 |
| FC Twente | 2018–19 | Eerste Divisie | 35 | 6 | 4 | 1 | 0 | 0 | 39 | 7 |
| FC Twente | 2019–20 | Eredivisie | 20 | 1 | 1 | 1 | 0 | 0 | 21 | 2 |
| FC Twente | Total | | 132 | 10 | 12 | 2 | 0 | 0 | 144 | 12 |
| Career total | | | 184 | 11 | 12 | 2 | 0 | 0 | 196 | 13 |

== Honours ==
=== Club ===
FC Twente

- Eerste Divisie: 2018–19
