= 2017–18 FC Twente season =

FC Twente
2017–18 season
- Chairman: Jan Schutrups
- Manager: Marino Pušić
- Stadium: Grolsch Veste
- Eredivisie: 18th
- KNVB Cup: Semi-Finals
- Top goalscorer: League: Oussama Assaidi (6 goals); All: Oussama Assaidi (7 goals)
- Highest home attendance: 29,300 vs Willem II (17 March 2018)
- Lowest home attendance: 17,100 vs FC Eindhoven (24 October 2017)
Home colours	Away colours	Third colours

During the 2017–18 FC Twente season, the club will participate in the Eredivisie and the KNVB Cup. It will be 53rd season in the history of the club and the 34th consecutive season in the top flight of the Dutch football.

== Season review ==
=== June ===
On 1 June, the club confirmed the signing of Alexander Laukart.

On 12 June, Twente and Nick Hengelman negotiated a two-year contract extension lasting until 30 June 2019.

== Squad ==
As of 30 January 2017

Squad No.	Name	Nationality	Position(s)	Date of birth (age)	Signed from	Contract End
Goalkeepers
13	Nick Hengelman	(Netherlands)	GK	15 November 1989 (age 37)	(Netherlands) Oss	30 June 2019
16	Joël Drommel	(Netherlands)	GK	16 November 1996 (age 30)	Youth Academy	30 June 2019
26	Jorn Brondeel	(Belgium)	GK	7 September 1993 (age 33)	(Belgium) Lierse	30 June 2021
Defenders
2	Hidde ter Avest	(Netherlands)	RB	20 May 1997 (age 29)	Youth Academy	30 June 2018
3	Thomas Lam	(Finland)	CB/CM	18 December 1993 (age 32)	(England) Nottingham Forest	30 June 2018
4	Jos Hooiveld	(Netherlands)	CB	22 April 1983 (age 43)	(Sweden) AIK	30 June 2018
5	Stefan Thesker (c)	(Germany)	CB	11 April 1991 (age 35)	(Germany) Greuther Fürth	30 June 2019
14	Richard Jensen	(Finland)	CB	17 March 1996 (age 30)	Youth Academy	30 June 2019
15	Cristián Cuevas	(Chile)	LB	2 April 1995 (age 31)	(Chile) Huachipato	30 June 2018
25	Peet Bijen	(Netherlands)	CB	28 January 1995 (age 31)	Youth Academy	30 June 2020
28	Jeroen van der Lely	(Netherlands)	RB/LB	22 March 1996 (age 30)	Youth Academy	30 June 2020
36	David Sambissa	(France)	RB/LB	11 January 1996 (age 30)	(France) Bordeaux	30 June 2018
Midfielders
6	Michaël Maria	(Curaçao)	AM/LB	31 January 1995 (age 31)	(Germany) Erzgebirge Aue	30 June 2018
10	Haris Vučkić	(Slovenia)	AM	21 August 1992 (age 34)	(England) Newcastle United	30 June 2020
11	Alexander Laukart	(Germany)	AM	25 October 1998 (age 28)	(Germany) Borussia Dortmund	30 June 2020
18	Michael Liendl	(Austria)	CM	25 October 1985 (age 41)	(Germany) 1860 Munich	30 June 2019
20	Adam Maher	(Morocco)	CM	20 July 1993 (age 33)	(Netherlands) PSV	30 June 2018
21	Danny Holla	(Netherlands)	CM	31 December 1987 (age 38)	(Netherlands) PEC Zwolle	30 June 2020
23	Jelle van der Heyden	(Netherlands)	DM	31 August 1995 (age 31)	Youth Academy	30 June 2020
Forwards
8	Oussama Assaidi	(Morocco)	RW/LW	15 August 1988 (age 38)	(United Arab Emirates) Al-Ahli	30 June 2019
9	Tom Boere	(Netherlands)	CF	24 November 1992 (age 33)	(Netherlands) Oss	30 June 2020
17	Marko Kvasina	(Austria)	CF	20 December 1996 (age 29)	Austria Wien	30 June 2021
19	Fredrik Jensen	(Finland)	RW/LW/AM	9 September 1997 (age 29)	Youth Academy	30 June 2020
24	Jari Oosterwijk	(Netherlands)	CF	3 March 1995 (age 31)	Youth Academy	30 June 2020
27	Luciano Slagveer	(Netherlands)	RW	5 October 1993 (age 33)	(Belgium) Lokeren	30 June 2018
29	Mounir El Hamdaoui	(Morocco)	CF	14 July 1984 (age 42)	(Saudi Arabia) Al-Taawoun	30 June 2018
30	Dylan George	(Netherlands)	RW	27 June 1998 (age 28)	Youth Academy	30 June 2019
34	Adnane Tighadouini	(Morocco)	LW	30 November 1992 (age 33)	(Spain) Málaga	30 June 2018

== New contracts ==
No.	Pos	Player	Contract length	Contract end	Date	Source
13	GK	(Netherlands) Nick Hengelman	2 years	2019	12 June 2017	

Last updated: 11 September 2017

== Transfers ==
=== In ===
==== Summer ====
No.	Pos	Player	Transferred From	Fee	Ends	Source
26	GK	(Belgium) Jorn Brondeel	(Belgium) Lierse	Undisclosed	30 June 2021	
21	MF	(Netherlands) Danny Holla	(Netherlands) PEC Zwolle	Free	30 June 2020	
11	MF	(Germany) Alexander Laukart	(Germany) Borussia Dortmund	Free	30 June 2020	
-	FW	(Netherlands) Alessio Da Cruz	(Netherlands) Dordrecht	Back from loan	30 June 2017	
24	FW	(Netherlands) Jari Oosterwijk	(Netherlands) NAC Breda	Back from loan	30 June 2020	
-	MF	(Ghana) Shadrach Eghan	(Denmark) Vendsyssel	Back from loan	30 June 2017	
9	FW	(Netherlands) Tom Boere	(Netherlands) Oss	Undisclosed	30 June 2020	
10	MF	(Slovenia) Haris Vučkić	(England) Newcastle United	Free	30 June 2020	
36	DF	(France) David Sambissa	(France) Bordeaux	Free	30 June 2018	
7	MF	(North Macedonia) Nikola Gjorgjev	(Switzerland) Grasshopper	Loan	30 June 2019	
17	FW	(Austria) Marko Kvasina	Austria Wien	Free	30 June 2021	
22	FW	(England) Isaac Buckley-Ricketts	(England) Manchester City	Loan	30 June 2018	
18	MF	(Austria) Michael Liendl	(Germany) 1860 Munich	Free	30 June 2019	
34	FW	(Morocco) Adnane Tighadouini	(Spain) Málaga	Loan	30 June 2018	
3	DF	(Finland) Thomas Lam	(England) Nottingham Forest	Loan	30 June 2018	
27	FW	(Netherlands) Luciano Slagveer	(Belgium) Lokeren	Loan	30 June 2018	
15	DF	(Chile) Cristián Cuevas	(Chile) Huachipato	Loan	30 June 2018	

==== Winter ====
No.	Pos	Player	Transferred From	Fee	Ends	Source
20	CM	(Morocco) Adam Maher	(Netherlands) PSV	Free	30 June 2018	
29	FW	(Morocco) Mounir El Hamdaoui	(Saudi Arabia) Al-Taawoun	Free	30 June 2018	
6	MF/DF	(Curaçao) Michaël Maria	(Germany) Erzgebirge Aue	Free	30 June 2018	

=== Out ===
==== Summer ====
No.	Pos	Player	Moving To	Fee	Date	Source
11	FW	(Belgium) Dylan Seys	(Belgium) Club Brugge	End of loan	30 June 2017	
14	FW	(Ghana) Yaw Yeboah	(England) Manchester City	End of loan	30 June 2017	
10	MF	(Kosovo) Bersant Celina	(England) Manchester City	End of loan	30 June 2017	
17	FW	(Turkey) Enes Ünal	(England) Manchester City	End of loan	30 June 2017	
27	FW	(Germany) Enis Bunjaki	(Germany) Eintracht Frankfurt	End of loan	30 June 2017	
1	GK	(Netherlands) Nick Marsman	(Netherlands) Utrecht	Free	30 June 2017	
20	GK	(Netherlands) Sonny Stevens	(Netherlands) Go Ahead Eagles	Free	22 May 2017	
7	MF	(Germany) Chinedu Ede	(Thailand) Bangkok United	Free	30 June 2017	
-	FW	(Netherlands) Alessio Da Cruz	(Italy) Novara	Free	31 May 2017	
-	MF	(Ghana) Shadrach Eghan	(Netherlands) Go Ahead Eagles	Free	30 June 2017	
12	FW	(Germany) Tim Hölscher	(Netherlands) Go Ahead Eagles	Free	19 May 2017	
43	MF	(Poland) Mateusz Klich	(England) Leeds United	Undisclosed	30 June 2017	
22	MF	(South Africa) Kamohelo Mokotjo	(England) Brentford	Undisclosed	6 July 2017	
-	FW	(Netherlands) Zeki Erkilinc	(Netherlands) Heracles	Loan	17 August 2017	
3	DF	(Denmark) Joachim Andersen	(Italy) Sampdoria	Undisclosed	26 August 2017	

==== Winter ====
No.	Pos	Player	Moving To	Fee	Date	Source
22	FW	(England) Isaac Buckley-Ricketts	(England) Manchester City	End of loan	12 January 2018	
6	DF	(Slovenia) Dejan Trajkovski	(Hungary) Puskás Akadémia	Undisclosed	19 January 2018	
7	MF	(North Macedonia) Nikola Gjorgjev	(Switzerland) Grasshoppers FC	End of loan	15 February 2018	

Last updated: 18 February 2018

== Non-competitive ==
=== Friendlies ===
1 July 2017 Friendly	GFC (Netherlands)	0–8	(Netherlands) Twente	Goor, Netherlands
17:00			George 14'; Boere 38', 44'; Vučkić 64', 87'; Oosterwijk 66', 83'; Browning 85'	Stadium: Sportpark Heeckeren; Attendance: 1,800; Referee: Bas Nijhuis

4 July 2017 Friendly	Twente (Netherlands)	1–1	(Denmark) Nordsjælland	Vriezenveen, Netherlands
19:00	George 13'		Tanor 49'	Stadium: Sportpark Het Midden (DOS '37); Attendance: 1,300; Referee: Ed Janssen

6 July 2017 Friendly	Twente (Netherlands)	0–3	(Germany) SV Meppen	Erica, Netherlands
19:00			Gebers 6'; Posipal 32'; Isitan 52'	Stadium: Sportpark De Veenschappen; Attendance: 1,200; Referee: Bas Nijhuis

8 July 2017 Friendly	Stranraer (Scotland)	0–5	(Netherlands) Twente	Stranraer, Scotland
15:00 BST			George 20'; Vučkić 31'; Lang 41' (o.g.); Oosterwijk 70', 85'	Stadium: Stair Park; Attendance: 1,700; Referee: Barry Cook

15 July 2017 Friendly	Hannover 96 (Germany)	0–0	(Netherlands) Twente	Sehnde, Germany
19:00				Stadium: Wahre-Dorff Arena; Attendance: 1,996; Referee: Robert Schröder

19 July 2017 Friendly	Twente (Netherlands)	0–3	(England) Everton	De Lutte, Netherlands
19:00			Mirallas 43'; Lennon 73'; Dowell 81'	Stadium: Sportpark de Lutte; Attendance: 37,700; Referee: Jochem Kamphuis

28 July 2017 Friendly	Bristol City (England)	2–0	(Netherlands) Twente	Bristol, England
19:45	Pack 23'; Bryan 55'			Stadium: Ashton Gate Stadium; Attendance: 5,330; Referee: Stuart Atwell

2 August 2017 Friendly	Twente (Netherlands)	0–0	(Spain) Espanyol	Goor, Netherlands
19:00				Stadium: Sportpark Heeckeren; Attendance: 1,500; Referee: Bas Nijhuis

5 August 2017 Friendly	Mainz 05 (Germany)	2–0	(Netherlands) Twente	Mainz, Germany
15:30	Bungert 95'; Brosinski 120'			Stadium: Bruchwegstadion; Attendance: 0 Referee: Patrick Alt

7 August 2017 Friendly	Utrecht (Netherlands)	2–0	(Netherlands) Twente	Utrecht, Netherlands
	Ould-Chikh; Venema			Stadium: Galgenwaard; Attendance: 0 Referee: Pol van Boekel

22 August 2017 Friendly	Twente (Netherlands)	0–1	(Netherlands) VVV-Venlo	Hengelo, Netherlands
			Bezat 75'	Attendance: 0 Referee: Gerrit Fikkert

31 August 2017 Friendly	Twente (Netherlands)	3–0	(Germany) VfL Osnabrück	Enschede, Netherlands
	Boere 5'; Oosterwijk 30'; George 65'			Stadium: De Grolsch Veste; Attendance: 0 Referee: Gerrit Fikkert

11 September 2017 Friendly	Twente (Netherlands)	1–1	(Netherlands) Emmen	Hengelo, Netherlands
	Oosterwijk 53' (pen.)		Bijlsma 31'	Attendance: 0 Referee: Pim Weghorst

5 October 2017 Friendly	Twente (Netherlands)	0–1	(Germany) Preußen Münster	Enschede, Netherlands
			Al-Haizaimeh 24'	Stadium: De Grolsch Veste; Attendance: 0 Referee: Jules Nelissen

16 October 2017 Friendly	Heracles (Netherlands)	1–2	(Netherlands) Twente	Almelo, Netherlands
	Vermeij 74'		Laukart 54'; Thesker 71'	Stadium: Polman Stadion; Attendance: 0 Referee: Gerrit Fikkert

31 October 2017 Friendly	Twente (Netherlands)	4–2	(Netherlands) De Graafschap	Hengelo, Netherlands
	Laukart 12'; Tighadouini 21' (pen.), 53', 60'		Van de Hurk 20'; El Jabi 40'	Attendance: 0 Referee: Jules Nelissen

9 November 2017 Friendly	VfL Wolfsburg (Germany)	2–1	(Netherlands) Twente	Wolfsburg
13:00	Osimhen 53'; Knoche 68'		Oosterwijk 60'	Stadium: AOK Stadion; Attendance: 300; Referee: Robert Schröder

6 January 2018 Friendly	VfB Stuttgart (Germany)	2–1	(Netherlands) Twente	La Manga, Spain
15:00	Gómez 29'; Ailton 84'		Sambissa 90'	Attendance: 600

7 January 2018 Friendly	Twente (Netherlands)	0–4	(Germany) Werder Bremen	San Pedro del Pinatar, Spain
15:30			Kainz 4'; Kruse 15', 40'; Eggestein 78'	Stadium: Pinatar Arena; Attendance: 500; Referee: José Joaquin Gallego Gambin

14 January 2018 Friendly	Emmen (Netherlands)	0–2	(Netherlands) Twente	Emmen
14:00			F. Jensen 24'; Bijen 79'	Stadium: De Oude Meerdijk; Attendance: 550; Referee: Martin Pérez

21 March 2018 Friendly	Twente (Netherlands)	4–0	(Netherlands) Emmen	Enschede
	George 10'; Slagveer 47', 60'; Tighadouini 62'			Stadium: De Grolsch Veste; Attendance: 0 Referee: Maurice Paarhuis

Last updated: 21 March 2018

== Competitions ==
=== Eredivisie ===
==== League matches ====
13 August 2017 1	Feyenoord	2–1	Twente	Rotterdam
14:30	Jørgensen 23'; Berghuis 61'		F. Jensen 37'	Stadium: De Kuip; Attendance: 47,500; Referee: Serdar Gözübüyük

19 August 2017 2	Twente	1–2	VVV-Venlo	Enschede
18:30	Boere 60'		Van Crooy 23'; Promes 41'	Stadium: De Grolsch Veste; Attendance: 23,800; Referee: Siemen Mulder

26 August 2017 3	PEC Zwolle	2–0	Twente	Zwolle
19:45	Mokhtar 33'; Van Polen 78' (pen.)			Stadium: MAC³PARK Stadion; Attendance: 12,800; Referee: Janssen

10 September 2017 4	Sparta Rotterdam	1–0	Twente	Rotterdam
14:30	Goodwin 18'			Stadium: Het Kasteel; Attendance: 10,034; Referee: Bax

17 September 2017 5	Twente	4–0	Utrecht	Enschede
14:30	Boere 9'; Lam 18'; Slagveer 35'; Assaidi 75'			Stadium: De Grolsch Veste; Attendance: 24,200; Referee: Jochem Kamphuis

24 September 2017 6	Groningen	1–0	Twente	Groningen
14:30	Idrissi 51'			Stadium: Euroborg; Attendance: 20,110; Referee: Martin van den Kerkhof

29 September 2017 7	Twente	2–1	Heracles	Enschede
20:00	F. Jensen 2'; Holla 77'		Gladon 52'	Stadium: De Grolsch Veste; Attendance: 27,100; Referee: Dennis Higler

15 October 2017 8	Willem II	3–1	Twente	Tilburg
14:30	Sol 45+1', 90+1'; Azzaoui 50'		Assaidi 40' (pen.)	Stadium: Koning Willem II Stadion; Attendance: 12,019; Referee: Richard Martens

21 October 2017 9	Twente	3–0	Roda JC	Enschede
20:45	Assaidi 26' (pen.), 57'; Bijen 73'			Stadium: De Grolsch Veste; Attendance: 23,500; Referee: Serdar Gözübüyük

27 October 2017 10	Twente	1–3	Excelsior	Enschede
20:00	Boere 2'		Faik 42'; Massop 74'; Karami 80'	Stadium: De Grolsch Veste; Attendance: 23,200; Referee: Allard Lindhout

5 November 2017 11	PSV	4–3	Twente	Eindhoven
20:45	Locadia 14'; Van Ginkel 61'; De Jong 72'; Thesker 90+1' (o.g.)		Thesker 21'; Lam 68'; F. Jensen 75'	Stadium: Philips Stadion; Attendance: 33,040; Referee: Dennis Higler

18 November 2017 12	Twente	0–4	Heerenveen	Enschede
18:30			Hoegh 24'; Vlap 43'; Odegaard 61'; Veerman 87'	Stadium: De Grolsch Veste; Attendance: 25,600; Referee: Jochem Kamphuis

24 November 2017 13	AZ	2–0	Twente	Alkmaar
20:00	Jahanbakhsh 65' (pen.); van Overeem 75'			Stadium: AFAS Stadion; Attendance: 14,601; Referee: Martin van den Kerkhof

2 December 2017 14	Twente	3–3	Ajax	Enschede
18:30	Thesker 48', 63'; Boere 89'		Schöne 33', 37'; Kluivert 79'	Stadium: De Grolsch Veste; Attendance: 27,500; Referee: Dennis Higler

9 December 2017 15	Twente	2–3	ADO Den Haag	Enschede
20:45	Holla 12'; Johnsen 35' (o.g.)		El Khayati 17', 90'; Johnsen 21'	Stadium: De Grolsch Veste; Attendance: 23,600; Referee: Allard Lindhout

12 December 2017 16	NAC Breda	1–2	Twente	Breda
18:30	Bijen 59' (o.g.)		Assaidi 48', 61'	Stadium: Rat Verlegh Stadion; Attendance: 17,589; Referee: Siemen Mulder

16 December 2017 17	Twente	1–1	Vitesse	Enschede
20:45	F. Jensen 14'		Mount 28'	Stadium: De Grolsch Veste; Attendance: 23,600; Referee: Jeroen Manschot

23 December 2017 18	Excelsior	0–0	Twente	Rotterdam
20:45				Stadium: Stadion Woudestein; Attendance: 4,369; Referee: Richard Martens

20 January 2018 19	Roda JC	1–1	Twente	Kerkrade
18:30	Schahin 88'		Vučkić 53'	Stadium: Parkstad Limburg Stadion; Attendance: 12,457; Referee: Reinold Wiedemeijer

27 January 2018 20	Twente	0–2	PSV	Enschede
19:45			Lozano 4'; Arias 90'	Stadium: De Grolsch Veste; Attendance: 25,700; Referee: Kevin Blom

3 February 2018 21	Heerenveen	1–0	Twente	Heerenveen
18:30	Hoegh 66'			Stadium: Abe Lenstra Stadion; Attendance: 22,600; Referee: Jeroen Manschot

7 February 2018 22	Twente	0–4	AZ	Enschede
18:30			Jahanbakhsh 10' (pen.), 90+3'; Weghorst 89', 90+1'	Stadium: De Grolsch Veste; Attendance: 23,400; Referee: Siemen Mulder

11 February 2018 23	Ajax	2–1	Twente	Amsterdam
12:30	Kluivert 3'; Schöne 71' (pen.)		Tighadouini 66'	Stadium: Johan Cruyff Arena; Attendance: 52,443; Referee: Serdar Gözübüyük

18 February 2018 24	Twente	1–1	Sparta Rotterdam	Enschede
14:30	Vučkić 85'		Friday 62'	Stadium: De Grolsch Veste; Attendance: 25,400; Referee: Pol van Boekel

25 February 2018 25	Utrecht	3–1	Twente	Utrecht
16:45	Klaiber 45+1'; Van de Streek 67'; Ayoub 77'		Vučkić 10'	Stadium: Galgenwaard; Attendance: 17,775; Referee: Jochem Kamphuis

4 March 2018 26	Twente	1–1	Groningen	Enschede
16:45	Boere 71'		Doan 57'	Stadium: De Grolsch Veste; Attendance: 23,900; Referee: Ed Janssen

9 March 2018 27	Heracles	2–1	Twente	Almelo
20:00	Peterson 57'; Maher 63' (o.g.)		Tighadouini 50'	Stadium: Polman Stadion; Attendance: 12,080; Referee: Kevin Blom

17 March 2018 28	Twente	2–2	Willem II	Enschede
18:30	Lam 43'; Bijen 87'		Tsimikas 14'; Sol 70'	Stadium: De Grolsch Veste; Attendance: 29,300; Referee: Reinold Wiedemeijer

1 April 2018 29	VVV-Venlo	0–0	Twente	Venlo
12:30				Stadium: De Koel; Attendance: 6,623; Referee: Allard Lindhout

8 April 2018 30	Twente	1–3	Feyenoord	Enschede
14:30	Maher 22'		Boëtius 18'; Berghuis 67'; Jørgensen 75'	Stadium: De Grolsch Veste; Attendance: 25,600; Referee: Danny Makkelie

14 April 2018 31	ADO Den Haag	2–1	Twente	The Hague
18:30	Johnsen 45+2', 75'		F. Jensen 13'	Stadium: Cars Jeans Stadion; Attendance: 13,876; Referee: Serdar Gözübüyük

17 April 2018 32	Twente	2–0	PEC Zwolle	Enschede
18:30	Van der Lely 21'; Maria 35'			Stadium: De Grolsch Veste; Attendance: 24,900; Referee: Pol van Boekel

29 April 2018 33	Vitesse	5–0	Twente	Arnhem
14:30	Serero 40'; Matavž 53', 88'; Linssen 68', 71'			Stadium: Gelredome; Attendance: 21,248; Referee: Jochem Kamphuis

6 May 2018 34	Twente	1–1	NAC Breda	Enschede
14:30	George 39'		Koch 16'	Stadium: De Grolsch Veste; Attendance: 25,600; Referee: Edwin van de Graaf

=== KNVB Cup ===
20 September 2017 First round	ONS Sneek	1–3	Twente	Sneek
19:45 GMT	Gonzalez 63'		Vučkić 15'; Tighadouini 37'; Liendl 57'	Stadium: Zuidersportpark; Attendance: 1,400; Referee: Allard Lindhout

24 October 2017 Second round	Twente	3–0	FC Eindhoven	Enschede
20:45 GMT	Boere 28', 49'; Tighadouini 56' (pen.)			Stadium: De Grolsch Veste; Attendance: 17,100; Referee: Edwin van de Graaf

20 December 2017 Eight-Finals	Twente	1–1 (6–5 p)	Ajax	Enschede
20:45 GMT	Assaidi 90+1'		Kluivert 18'	Stadium: De Grolsch Veste; Attendance: 26,700; Referee: Pol van Boekel
	Penalties
	Assaidi (penalty scored); Holla (penalty scored); Tighadouini (penalty missed); Cuevas (penalty scored); Liendl (penalty scored); Laukart (penalty scored); Bijen (penalty scored)		(penalty scored) Schöne; (penalty scored) De Jong; (penalty scored) Van de Beek; (penalty missed) Ziyech; (penalty scored) Huntelaar; (penalty scored) Veltman; (penalty missed) De Ligt

30 January 2018 Quarterfinals	Twente	3–1	Cambuur	Enschede
20:45 GMT	Assaidi 60' (pen.); Maher 68', 76'		Schils 33'	Stadium: De Grolsch Veste; Attendance: 22,600; Referee: Ed Janssen

28 February 2018 Semi-finals	AZ	4–0	Twente	Alkmaar
18:30 GMT	Guus Til 24'; Weghorst 64'; Idrissi 68', 73'			Stadium: AFAS Stadion; Attendance: 13,338; Referee: Danny Makkelie

Last updated: 28 February 2018

== Statistics ==
=== Appearances ===
No.	Pos.	Name	Eredivisie		KNVB Cup		Total		Discipline	
No.	Pos.	Name	Apps	Goals	Apps	Goals	Apps	Goals	Yellow card	Red card
2	DF	(Netherlands) Hidde ter Avest	22	0	5	0	27	0	1	0
3	DF	(Finland) Thomas Lam	28	3	3	0	31	3	11	0
4	DF	(Netherlands) Jos Hooiveld	14	0	2	0	16	0	3	0
5	DF	(Germany) Stefan Thesker	18	3	5	0	23	3	6	1
6	DF/MF	(Curaçao) Michaël Maria	6	1	1	0	7	1	1	0
8	FW	(Morocco) Oussama Assaidi	26	6	4	2	30	8	3	0
9	FW	(Netherlands) Tom Boere	31	5	5	2	36	7	3	0
10	MF	(Slovenia) Haris Vučkić	12	3	3	1	15	4	5	0
11	MF	(Germany) Alexander Laukart	8	0	1	0	9	0	1	0
12	MF	(Denmark) Jonathan Frimann	0	0	0	0	0	0	0	0
13	GK	(Netherlands) Nick Hengelman	0	0	0	0	0	0	0	0
14	DF	(Finland) Richard Jensen	10	0	2	0	12	0	0	0
15	DF	(Chile) Cristián Cuevas	24	0	4	0	28	0	12	1
16	GK	(Netherlands) Joël Drommel	18	0	3	0	21	0	0	0
17	FW	(Austria) Marko Kvasina	13	0	1	0	14	0	2	0
18	MF	(Austria) Michael Liendl	15	0	3	1	18	1	0	0
19	FW	(Finland) Fredrik Jensen	31	5	4	0	35	5	4	0
20	MF	(Morocco) Adam Maher	16	1	2	2	18	3	3	0
21	MF	(Netherlands) Danny Holla	25	1	2	0	27	1	5	0
23	MF	(Netherlands) Jelle van der Heyden	11	0	1	0	12	0	3	0
24	FW	(Netherlands) Jari Oosterwijk	0	0	0	0	0	0	0	0
25	DF	(Netherlands) Peet Bijen	31	2	5	0	36	2	3	0
26	GK	(Belgium) Jorn Brondeel	16	0	2	0	18	0	0	0
27	FW	(Netherlands) Luciano Slagveer	19	1	2	0	21	1	0	0
28	DF	(Netherlands) Jeroen van der Lely	21	1	5	0	26	1	1	0
29	FW	(Morocco) Mounir El Hamdaoui	5	0	1	0	6	0	0	0
30	FW	(Netherlands) Dylan George	6	1	0	0	6	1	0	0
32	DF	(France) David Sambissa	0	0	0	0	0	0	0	0
33	MF	(Netherlands) Godfried Roemeratoe	0	0	0	0	0	0	0	0
34	FW	(Morocco) Adnane Tighadouini	24	2	3	2	27	3	2	0
36	FW	(Netherlands) Rashaan Fernandes	1	0	0	0	1	0	0	0
37	FW	(Netherlands) Ryan Trotman	1	0	0	0	1	0	0	0
Players who left the club during the 2017–18 season
3	DF	(Denmark) Joachim Andersen	2	0	0	0	2	0	0	0
22	FW	(England) Isaac Buckley-Ricketts	6	0	2	0	8	0	0	0
6	DF	(Slovenia) Dejan Trajkovski	4	0	1	0	5	0	1	0
7	MF	(North Macedonia) Nikola Gjorgjev	2	0	1	0	3	0	0	0

Last updated: 29 April 2018

=== Goalscorers ===
As of 6 May 2018

Rank	Player	Position	Eredivisie	KNVB Cup	Total
1	(Morocco) Oussama Assaidi	FW	6	2	8
2	(Netherlands) Tom Boere	FW	5	2	7
3	(Finland) Fredrik Jensen	FW	5	0	5
4	(Slovenia) Haris Vučkić	MF	3	1	4
4	(Morocco) Adnane Tighadouini	FW	2	2	4
5	(Germany) Stefan Thesker	DF	3	0	3
5	(Finland) Thomas Lam	DF	3	0	3
5	(Morocco) Adam Maher	MF	1	2	3
6	(Netherlands) Danny Holla	MF	2	0	2
6	(Netherlands) Peet Bijen	DF	2	0	2
7	(Netherlands) Luciano Slagveer	FW	1	0	1
7	(Netherlands) Jeroen van der Lely	DF	1	0	1
7	(Curaçao) Michaël Maria	DF	1	0	1
7	(Netherlands) Dylan George	FW	1	0	1
7	(Austria) Michael Liendl	MF	0	1	1
Own goals			1	0	1
Total			37	10	47
