= 2020–21 Puskás Akadémia FC season =

Puskás Akadémia
2020–21 season
- Chairman: Felcsúti Utánpótlás Neveléséért Alapítvány
- Manager: Zsolt Hornyák
- Stadium: Pancho Aréna
- Nemzeti Bajnokság I: 2nd
- Magyar Kupa: Round of 16
- UEFA Europa League: First qualifying round
Home colours	Away colours	Third colours

The 2020–21 season was Puskás Akadémia Football Club's 7th competitive season, 4th consecutive season in the Nemzeti Bajnokság I and 9th year in existence as a football club. In addition to the domestic league, Puskás Akadémia participated in this season's editions of the Magyar Kupa and UEFA Europa League.

== Transfers ==
=== Summer ===
In: Note: Flags indicate national team as defined under FIFA eligibility rules; some limited exceptions apply. Players may hold more than one non-FIFA nationality.

No.	Pos.	Nation	Player
7	FW	HUN	Tamás Kiss (loan return from Diósgyőr)
10	FW	ROU	Alexandru Băluță (from (Czech Republic) Slavia Prague)
27	MF	ALB	Liridon Latifi (loan return from (Moldova) Sheriff Tiraspol)
31	GK	HUN	Ágoston Kiss (from Szombathelyi Haladás)
33	DF	POR	João Nunes (from (Greece) Panathinaikos)
39	FW	MNG	Ganbold Ganbayar (from Puskás Akadémia II)
51	MF	HUN	Gábor Sipos (from Puskás Akadémia II)
52	FW	HUN	László Vizler (from Puskás Akadémia U-19)
77	FW	CRO	Antonio Mance (loan from (Croatia) Osijek)
84	MF	ROU	Marius Corbu (from Puskás Akadémia II)
90	FW	BRA	Weslen Júnior (from (Brazil) São Bernardo)

Out: Note: Flags indicate national team as defined under FIFA eligibility rules; some limited exceptions apply. Players may hold more than one non-FIFA nationality.

No.	Pos.	Nation	Player
7	FW	AUS	Golgol Mebrahtu (to Puskás Akadémia II)
9	FW	HUN	Bence Sós (to Debrecen)
11	MF	SVK	Ján Vlasko (to (Slovakia) Spartak Trnava)
14	MF	UKR	Artem Favorov (loan to Zalaegerszeg)
18	DF	HUN	András Huszti (loan to Budafok)
19	GK	HUN	Lajos Hegedűs (to Paks)
33	MF	HUN	József Varga (to Debrecen)
52	MF	HUN	Zsolt Magyar (loan to Csákvár)
68	DF	HUN	János Hegedűs (to Diósgyőr)
77	FW	HUN	Ádám Gyurcsó (loan return to (Croatia) Hajduk Split)
80	MF	HUN	Botond Nándori (loan to Csákvár)

=== Winter ===
In: Note: Flags indicate national team as defined under FIFA eligibility rules; some limited exceptions apply. Players may hold more than one non-FIFA nationality.

No.	Pos.	Nation	Player
49	FW	HUN	Krisztián Géresi (loan from Fehérvár)
—	MF	HUN	Bálint Kártik (from Nyíregyháza)

Out: Note: Flags indicate national team as defined under FIFA eligibility rules; some limited exceptions apply. Players may hold more than one non-FIFA nationality.

No.	Pos.	Nation	Player
7	FW	AUS	Golgol Mebrahtu
17	FW	CZE	David Vaněček (to Diósgyőr)
20	MF	HUN	Márton Radics (loan to Gyirmót)
—	MF	HUN	Bálint Kártik (loan to Csákvár)

=== Nemzeti Bajnokság I ===
==== League table ====
Pos	Team	Pld	W	D	L	GF	GA	GD	Pts	Qualification or relegation
1	Ferencváros (C)	33	23	9	1	69	22	+47	78	Qualification for the Champions League first qualifying round
2	Puskás Akadémia	33	18	4	11	52	42	+10	58	Qualification for the Europa Conference League first qualifying round
3	Fehérvár	33	16	8	9	68	38	+30	56	Qualification for the Europa Conference League first qualifying round
4	Paks	33	14	8	11	76	64	+12	50	
5	Kisvárda	33	12	10	11	30	36	−6	46	

Source: Hungarian Football Federation (in Hungarian), Soccerway
Rules for classification: 1) Points; 2) Matches won; 3) Goal difference; 4) Goals scored; 5) Head-to-head points; 6) Head-to-head goal difference; 7) Head-to-head away goals scored; 8) Fair play ranking; 9) Drawing of lots.
(C) Champions

==== Results summary ====
Overall								Home						Away					
Pld	W	D	L	GF	GA	GD	Pts	W	D	L	GF	GA	GD	W	D	L	GF	GA	GD
33	18	4	11	52	42	+10	58	11	2	4	30	17	+13	7	2	7	22	25	−3

Last updated: 9 May 2021.
Source: NB1

==== Results by round ====
Round	1	2	3	4	5	6	7	8	9	10	11	12	13	14	15	16	17	18	19	20	21	22	23	24	25	26	27	28	29	30	31	32	33
Ground	H	A	H	A	H	A	H	A	H	H	A	H	A	H	A	A	A	H	A	H	A	H	A	H	A	H	H	H	A	H	A	H	A
Result	P	W	W	L	W	L	L	L	L	W	L	W	W	D	W	D	L	D	W	W	W	W	W	L	W	W	W	W	D	W	L	L	L
Position	9	4	1	4	1	3	6	7	6	7	6	4	5	3	3	4	6	4	3	2	2	2	2	2	2	2	2	2	2	2	2	2	2

Source: Matches
A = Away; H = Home; W = Win; D = Draw; L = Loss

==== Matches ====
16 August 2020 1	Puskás Akadémia	–	Budapest Honvéd	Felcsút
18:00 CEST (UTC+2)				Stadium: Pancho Aréna; Referee: Péter Antal

4 September 2020 2	Kisvárda	0–3	Puskás Akadémia	Kisvárda
20:00 CEST (UTC+2)		Report	Plšek 30' (pen.); Komáromi 72'; Nagy 88'	Stadium: Várkerti Stadion; Attendance: 2,250; Referee: Gergő Bogár

30 August 2020 3	Puskás Akadémia	3–2	Újpest	Felcsút
20:00 CEST (UTC+2)	Komáromi 11'; Szolnoki 49'; Plšek 83'	Report	Simon 44'; Máté 86'	Stadium: Pancho Aréna; Attendance: 700; Referee: Ferenc Karakó

12 September 2020 4	Fehérvár	3–1	Puskás Akadémia	Székesfehérvár
19:30 CEST (UTC+2)	Nikolić 28'; Petryak 84'; Zivzivadze 90+1'	Report	Knežević 57'	Stadium: MOL Aréna Sóstó; Attendance: 3,011; Referee: Zoltán Iványi

25 September 2020 5	Puskás Akadémia	1–0	Mezőkövesd	Felcsút
20:00 CEST (UTC+2)	Băluță 59'	Report		Stadium: Pancho Aréna; Attendance: 782; Referee: Gergő Bogár

4 October 2020 6	Ferencváros	2–1	Puskás Akadémia	Budapest
17:30 CEST (UTC+2)	Isael 43', 50'	Report	Nunes 4'	Stadium: Groupama Arena; Attendance: 8,759; Referee: Ferenc Karakó

17 October 2020 7	Puskás Akadémia	0–3	MTK Budapest	Felcsút
19:30 CEST (UTC+2)		Report	Miovski 4'; Gera 26'; Prosser 80'	Stadium: Pancho Aréna; Attendance: 957; Referee: Csaba Pintér

25 October 2020 8	Diósgyőr	3–0	Puskás Akadémia	Miskolc
19:30 CEST (UTC+2)	Dražić 5'; Ivanovski 18' (pen.); Grozav 38'	Report		Stadium: DVTK Stadion; Attendance: 1,730; Referee: Sándor Andó-Szabó

31 October 2020 9	Puskás Akadémia	1–2	Zalaegerszeg	Felcsút
14:45 CEST (UTC+2)	Mance 13'	Report	Lesjak 20'; Szánthó 53'	Stadium: Pancho Aréna; Attendance: 789; Referee: Péter Zierkelbach

4 November 2020 1	Puskás Akadémia	1–0	Budapest Honvéd	Felcsút
15:30 CEST (UTC+2)	Meißner 90+1'	Report		Stadium: Pancho Aréna; Attendance: 623; Referee: József Erdos

7 November 2020 10	Paks	6–2	Puskás Akadémia	Paks
14:45 CEST (UTC+2)	Hahn 12', 15', 19', 49'; Bognár 52'; Ádám 81'	Report	Băluță 27'; Mance 85'	Stadium: Fehérvári úti Stadion; Attendance: 1,089; Referee: Péter Antal

21 November 2020 11	Puskás Akadémia	3–0	Budafok	Felcsút
14:45 CEST (UTC+2)	Knežević 39'; Mance 58', 72'	Report		Stadium: Pancho Aréna; Attendance: x Referee: Ádám Pillók
Note: COVID-19 pandemic in Hungary

29 November 2020 12	Budapest Honvéd	0–1	Puskás Akadémia	Budapest
18:45 CEST (UTC+2)		Report	Vaněček 90+3'	Stadium: Hidegkuti Nándor Stadion; Attendance: x Referee: Ádám Pillók
Note: COVID-19 pandemic in Hungary

5 December 2020 13	Puskás Akadémia	0–0	Kisvárda	Felcsút
19:30 CET (UTC+1)		Report		Stadium: Pancho Aréna; Attendance: x Referee: Péter Antal
Note: COVID-19 pandemic in Hungary

11 December 2020 14	Újpest	1–2	Puskás Akadémia	Budapest
20:00 CET (UTC+1)	Onovo 75'	Report	Mance 56'; Plšek 71'	Stadium: Szusza Ferenc Stadion; Attendance: x Referee: Péter Zierkelbach
Note: COVID-19 pandemic in Hungary

15 December 2020 15	Fehérvár	1–1	Puskás Akadémia	Székesfehérvár
20:15 CET (UTC+1)	Bamgboye 59'	Report	Knežević 19'	Stadium: MOL Aréna Sóstó; Attendance: x Referee: Gergő Bogár
Note: COVID-19 pandemic in Hungary

20 December 2020 16	Mezőkövesd	1–0	Puskás Akadémia	Mezőkövesd
14:30 CET (UTC+1)	Beširović 6'	Report		Stadium: Mezőkövesdi Városi Stadion; Attendance: x Referee: Csaba Pintér
Note: COVID-19 pandemic in Hungary

23 January 2021 17	Puskás Akadémia	1–1	Ferencváros	Felcsút
17:00 CET (UTC+1)	Slagveer 43'	Report	Uzuni 81'	Stadium: Pancho Aréna; Attendance: x Referee: Péter Antal
Note: COVID-19 pandemic in Hungary

30 January 2021 18	MTK Budapest	0–1	Puskás Akadémia	Budapest
12:30 CET (UTC+1)		Report	Géresi 90+5'	Stadium: Hidegkuti Nándor Stadion; Attendance: x Referee: József Erdős
Note: COVID-19 pandemic in Hungary

3 February 2021 19	Puskás Akadémia	2–0	Diósgyőr	Felcsút
16:00 CET (UTC+1)	Kiss 24'; Plšek 53' (pen.)	Report		Stadium: Pancho Aréna; Attendance: x Referee: Péter Zierkelbach
Note: COVID-19 pandemic in Hungary

7 February 2021 20	Zalaegerszeg	1–2	Puskás Akadémia	Zalaegerszeg
16:15 CET (UTC+1)	Lesjak 58'	Report	Knežević 47', 83'	Stadium: ZTE Arena; Attendance: x Referee: Ferenc Karakó
Note: COVID-19 pandemic in Hungary

13 February 2021 21	Puskás Akadémia	3–2	Paks	Felcsút
14:45 CET (UTC+1)	Mance 21'; Kiss 24'; Plšek 81'	Report	Böde 68'; Hahn 75' (pen.)	Stadium: Pancho Aréna; Attendance: x Referee: Káprály Mihály
Note: COVID-19 pandemic in Hungary

21 February 2021 22	Budafok	0–3	Puskás Akadémia	Budapest
14:30 CET (UTC+1)		Report	Băluță 3'; Slagveer 64'; Mance 90+2' (pen.)	Stadium: Promontor utcai Stadion; Attendance: x Referee: Gergő Bogár
Note: COVID-19 pandemic in Hungary

27 February 2021 23	Puskás Akadémia	1–2	Budapest Honvéd	Felcsút
17:00 CET (UTC+1)	Knežević 18'	Report	Gazdag 33', 72' (pen.)	Stadium: Pancho Aréna; Attendance: x Referee: Balázs Berke
Note: COVID-19 pandemic in Hungary

2 March 2021 24	Kisvárda	0–1	Puskás Akadémia	Kisvárda
15:15 CET (UTC+1)		Report	Knežević 39'	Stadium: Várkerti Stadion; Attendance: x Referee: Gergő Bogár
Note: COVID-19 pandemic in Hungary

6 March 2021 25	Puskás Akadémia	2–1	Újpest	Felcsút
19:30 CET (UTC+1)	Knežević 34' (pen.); Géresi 72'	Report	Beridze 45+1' (pen.)	Stadium: Pancho Aréna; Attendance: x Referee: Ádám Farkas
Note: COVID-19 pandemic in Hungary

14 March 2021 26	Puskás Akadémia	1–0	Fehérvár	Felcsút
14:15 CET (UTC+1)	Slagveer 68'	Report		Stadium: Pancho Aréna; Attendance: x Referee: Péter Solymosi
Note: COVID-19 pandemic in Hungary

4 April 2021 27	Puskás Akadémia	2–0	Mezőkövesd	Felcsút
19:15 CEST (UTC+2)	Géresi 9'; Băluță 90+3'	Report		Stadium: Pancho Aréna; Attendance: x Referee: Ferenc Karakó
Note: COVID-19 pandemic in Hungary

10 April 2021 28	Ferencváros	1–1	Puskás Akadémia	Budapest
19:30 CEST (UTC+2)	Laïdouni 77'	Report	João Nunes 7'	Stadium: Groupama Aréna; Attendance: x Referee: Tamás Bognár
Note: COVID-19 pandemic in Hungary

18 April 2021 29	Puskás Akadémia	3–0	MTK Budapest	Felcsút
15:15 CEST (UTC+2)	Kiss 9'; Plšek 36' (pen.), 69'	Report		Stadium: Pancho Aréna; Attendance: x Referee: Káprály Mihály
Note: COVID-19 pandemic in Hungary

21 April 2021 30	Diósgyőr	2–1	Puskás Akadémia	Miskolc
17:30 CEST (UTC+2)	Grozav 22'; Molnár 90+4'	Report	Urblík 75'	Stadium: Diósgyőri Stadion; Attendance: x Referee: István Vad
Note: COVID-19 pandemic in Hungary

24 April 2021 31	Puskás Akadémia	1–4	Zalaegerszeg	Felcsút
14:45 CEST (UTC+2)	Komáromi 10'	Report	Favorov 13'; Tajti 75'; Futács 88', 90+2'	Stadium: Pancho Aréna; Attendance: x Referee: Péter Solymosi
Note: COVID-19 pandemic in Hungary

30 April 2021 32	Paks	4–2	Puskás Akadémia	Paks
20:00 CEST (UTC+2)	Böde 62'; João Nunes 71' (o.g.); Bognár 75', 83'	Report	Komáromi 22'; Szabó 88' (o.g.)	Stadium: Fehérvári úti Stadion; Attendance: x Referee: Péter Zierkelbach
Note: COVID-19 pandemic in Hungary

9 May 2021 33	Puskás Akadémia	5–0	Budafok	Felcsút
17:30 CEST (UTC+2)	Nagy 8', 16'; Knežević 15'; Slagveer 34'; Spandler 73'	Report		Stadium: Pancho Aréna; Attendance: x Referee: Csaba Pintér
Note: COVID-19 pandemic in Hungary

=== Magyar Kupa ===
10 October 2020 Round of 128	Toponár	0–7	Puskás Akadémia	Toponár
14:00 CEST (UTC+2)		Report	Plšek 2'; Slagveer 8', 26'; Băluță 15', 27'; Nagy 36'; Mance 78'	Stadium: Városi Sporttelep; Referee: Ákos Gaál

28 October 2020 Round of 64	Szentlőrinc	0–4 (a.e.t.)	Puskás Akadémia	Kozármisleny
12:30 CEST (UTC+2)		Report	Mance 97', 98'; Plšek 110'; Knežević 118'	Stadium: Kozármislenyi Stadion; Referee: Mihály Káprály

10 February 2021 Round of 32	Hódmezővásárhely	0–3	Puskás Akadémia	Hódmezővásárhely
13:00 CET (UTC+1)		Report	Plšek 13' (pen.); Kiss 47'; Nagy 84'	Stadium: Városi Stadion; Attendance: x Referee: Sándor Szilágyi

24 February 2021 Round of 16	Puskás Akadémia	1–2	Újpest	Felcsút
16:00 CET (UTC+1)	João Nunes 84'	Report	Tallo 45+2' (pen.); Beridze 84'	Stadium: Pancho Aréna; Attendance: x Referee: János Takács

=== UEFA Europa League ===
==== First qualifying round ====
27 August 2020 Q1	Hammarby (Sweden)	3–0	(Hungary) Puskás Akadémia	Stockholm, Sweden
19:00 CEST (UTC+2)	Khalili 14'; Bojanić 32'; Paulinho 84'	Report		Stadium: Tele2 Arena; Attendance: 0 Referee: Mario Zebec Croatia

== Statistics ==
=== Appearances and goals ===
Last updated on 9 May 2021.

No.	Pos	Nat	Player	Total		Nemzeti Bajnokság I		Magyar Kupa		Europa League	
No.	Pos	Nat	Player	Apps	Goals	Apps	Goals	Apps	Goals	Apps	Goals
1	GK	(Hungary) HUN	Balázs Tóth	34	-42	30	-40	4	-2	0	0
3	DF	(Portugal) POR	João Nunes	23	3	22	2	1	1	0	0
5	DF	(Germany) GER	Thomas Meißner	22	1	21	1	1	0	0	0
6	MF	(Netherlands) NED	Yoell van Nieff	28	0	24	0	4	0	0	0
7	FW	(Hungary) HUN	Tamás Kiss	36	4	32	3	3	1	1	0
8	MF	(Slovakia) SVK	Jozef Urblík	24	1	22	1	2	0	0	0
10	FW	(Romania) ROU	Alexandru Băluță	28	6	25	4	3	2	0	0
11	FW	(Netherlands) NED	Luciano Slagveer	32	6	28	4	4	2	0	0
15	MF	(Czech Republic) CZE	Jakub Plšek	34	10	29	7	4	3	1	0
22	DF	(Hungary) HUN	Roland Szolnoki	28	1	23	1	4	0	1	0
23	DF	(Hungary) HUN	Csaba Spandler	30	1	25	1	4	0	1	0
25	MF	(Hungary) HUN	Zsolt Nagy	32	5	27	3	4	2	1	0
26	DF	(Bulgaria) BUL	Kamen Hadzhiev	8	0	6	0	1	0	1	0
27	MF	(Albania) ALB	Liridon Latifi	1	0	0	0	0	0	1	0
29	FW	(Romania) ROU	Nándor Tamás	10	0	8	0	2	0	0	0
30	MF	(Croatia) CRO	Josip Knežević	32	10	29	9	3	1	0	0
39	FW	(Mongolia) MNG	Ganbold Ganbayar	3	0	3	0	0	0	0	0
46	GK	(Slovakia) SVK	Péter Molnár	0	0	0	0	0	0	0	0
49	FW	(Hungary) HUN	Krisztián Géresi	13	3	12	3	1	0	0	0
51	MF	(Hungary) HUN	Gábor Sipos	1	0	1	0	0	0	0	0
52	FW	(Hungary) HUN	László Vizler	2	0	2	0	0	0	0	0
74	GK	(Hungary) HUN	Martin Auerbach	5	-5	3	-2	1	0	1	-3
77	FW	(Croatia) CRO	Antonio Mance	30	10	26	7	4	3	0	0
84	MF	(Romania) ROU	Marius Corbu	24	0	20	0	3	0	1	0
87	MF	(Hungary) HUN	Gergő Ominger	2	0	2	0	0	0	0	0
90	FW	(Brazil) BRA	Weslen Júnior	13	0	9	0	3	0	1	0
97	FW	(Hungary) HUN	György Komáromi	21	4	16	4	4	0	1	0
99	DF	(Hungary) HUN	László Deutsch	24	0	22	0	1	0	1	0
Youth players:
12	GK	(Hungary) HUN	Márk Pataki	0	0	0	0	0	0	0	0
19	DF	(Ukraine) UKR	Artem Nahirnyj	0	0	0	0	0	0	0	0
31	GK	(Hungary) HUN	Ágoston Kiss	0	0	0	0	0	0	0	0
56	DF	(Hungary) HUN	Zétény Hosszú	0	0	0	0	0	0	0	0
58	MF	(Hungary) HUN	Zalán Nagy	0	0	0	0	0	0	0	0
59	FW	(Hungary) HUN	Benedek Kalmár	1	0	0	0	0	0	1	0
67	FW	(Hungary) HUN	Zsombor Gruber	0	0	0	0	0	0	0	0
Out to loan:
20	MF	(Hungary) HUN	Márton Radics	7	0	5	0	1	0	1	0
Players no longer at the club:
17	FW	(Czech Republic) CZE	David Vaněček	8	1	7	1	1	0	0	0

=== Top scorers ===
Includes all competitive matches. The list is sorted by shirt number when total goals are equal.

Last updated on 9 May 2021

Position	Nation	Number	Name	Nemzeti Bajnokság I	UEFA Europa League	Magyar Kupa	Total
1	(Croatia)	30	Josip Knežević	9	0	1	10
2	(Croatia)	77	Antonio Mance	7	0	3	10
3	(Czech Republic)	15	Jakub Plšek	7	0	3	10
4	(Romania)	10	Alexandru Băluță	4	0	2	6
5	(Netherlands)	11	Luciano Slagveer	4	0	2	6
6	(Hungary)	25	Zsolt Nagy	3	0	2	5
7	(Hungary)	97	György Komáromi	4	0	0	4
8	(Hungary)	7	Tamás Kiss	3	0	1	4
9	(Hungary)	49	Krisztián Géresi	3	0	0	3
10	(Portugal)	4	João Nunes	2	0	1	3
11	(Hungary)	22	Roland Szolnoki	1	0	0	1
12	(Germany)	5	Thomas Meißner	1	0	0	1
13	(Czech Republic)	17	David Vaněček	1	0	0	1
14	(Slovakia)	8	Jozef Urblík	1	0	0	1
15	(Hungary)	23	Csaba Spandler	1	0	0	1
/	/	/	Own goals	1	0	0	1
			TOTALS	52	0	15	67

=== Disciplinary record ===
Includes all competitive matches. Players with 1 card or more included only.

Last updated on 9 May 2021

Position	Nation	Number	Name	Nemzeti Bajnokság I		UEFA Europa League		Magyar Kupa		Total (Hu Total)	
Position	Nation	Number	Name	Booked	Sent off (straight red)	Booked	Sent off (straight red)	Booked	Sent off (straight red)	Booked	Sent off (straight red)
GK	(Hungary)	1	Balázs Tóth	2	0	0	0	0	0	2 (2)	0 (0)
DF	(Portugal)	3	João Nunes	3	0	0	0	0	0	3 (3)	0 (0)
DF	(Germany)	5	Thomas Meißner	2	0	0	0	0	0	2 (2)	0 (0)
MF	(Netherlands)	6	Yoell van Nieff	6	1	0	0	2	0	8 (6)	1 (1)
FW	(Hungary)	7	Tamás Kiss	5	0	1	0	0	0	6 (5)	0 (0)
MF	(Slovakia)	8	Jozef Urblík	2	0	0	0	0	0	2 (2)	0 (0)
FW	(Romania)	10	Alexandru Băluță	5	1	0	0	1	0	6 (5)	1 (1)
FW	(Netherlands)	11	Luciano Slagveer	5	0	0	0	0	0	5 (5)	0 (0)
MF	(Czech Republic)	15	Jakub Plšek	5	0	0	0	1	0	6 (5)	0 (0)
FW	(Czech Republic)	17	David Vaněček	2	0	0	0	0	0	2 (2)	0 (0)
MF	(Hungary)	20	Márton Radics	2	0	0	0	0	0	2 (2)	0 (0)
DF	(Hungary)	22	Roland Szolnoki	11	0	0	0	0	0	11 (11)	0 (0)
DF	(Hungary)	23	Csaba Spandler	4	1	0	0	1	0	5 (4)	1 (1)
MF	(Hungary)	25	Zsolt Nagy	7	0	1	0	1	0	9 (7)	0 (0)
DF	(Bulgaria)	26	Kamen Hadzhiev	0	0	0	0	0	1	0 (0)	1 (0)
MF	(Albania)	27	Liridon Latifi	0	0	1	0	0	0	1 (0)	0 (0)
MF	(Croatia)	30	Josip Knežević	5	0	0	0	1	0	6 (5)	0 (0)
FW	(Croatia)	77	Antonio Mance	3	1	0	0	0	0	3 (3)	1 (1)
MF	(Romania)	84	Marius Corbu	3	0	0	0	0	0	3 (3)	0 (0)
FW	(Brazil)	90	Weslen Júnior	0	0	0	0	1	0	1 (0)	0 (0)
FW	(Hungary)	97	György Komáromi	2	0	0	0	1	0	3 (2)	0 (0)
DF	(Hungary)	99	László Deutsch	3	0	0	0	0	0	3 (3)	0 (0)
			TOTALS	77	4	3	0	9	1	89 (77)	5 (4)

=== Overall ===
Games played	38 (33 Nemzeti Bajnokság I, 1 UEFA Europa League and 4 Magyar Kupa)
Games won	21 (18 Nemzeti Bajnokság I, 0 UEFA Europa League and 3 Magyar Kupa)
Games drawn	4 (4 Nemzeti Bajnokság I, 0 UEFA Europa League and 0 Magyar Kupa)
Games lost	13 (11 Nemzeti Bajnokság I, 1 UEFA Europa League and 1 Magyar Kupa)
Goals scored	67
Goals conceded	47
Goal difference	+20
Yellow cards	89
Red cards	5
Worst discipline	(Hungary) Roland Szolnoki (11 (yellow card) , 0 (red card) )
Best result	7–0 (A) v Toponár - Magyar Kupa - 10-10-2020
Worst result	2–6 (A) v Paks - Nemzeti Bajnokság I - 07-11-2020
Most appearances	(Hungary) Tamás Kiss (36 appearances)
Top scorer	(Croatia) Antonio Mance (10 goals)
Top scorer	(Czech Republic) Jakub Plšek (10 goals)
Top scorer	(Croatia) Josip Knežević (10 goals)
Points	67/114 (58.77%)

Last updated: 9 May 2021
