= Haris Vučkić =

Slovenian footballer (born 1992)

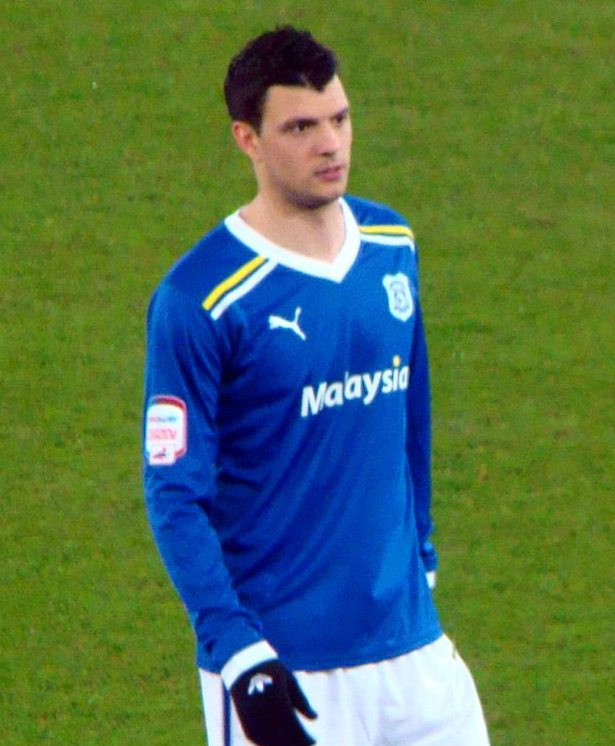
- Vučkić with Cardiff City in 2012

Personal information
- Date of birth: 21 August 1992 (age 34)
- Place of birth: Ljubljana, Slovenia
- Height: 1.91 m (6 ft 3 in)
- Positions: Forward; attacking midfielder

Team information
- Current team: Brinje Grosuplje
- Number: 9

Youth career
- Domžale

Senior career*
Years	Team	Apps	(Gls)
2008–2009	Domžale	5	(0)
2009–2017	Newcastle United	7	(0)
2012	→ Cardiff City (loan)	5	(1)
2013–2014	→ Rotherham United (loan)	22	(4)
2015	→ Rangers (loan)	15	(8)
2015–2016	→ Wigan Athletic (loan)	15	(2)
2016–2017	→ Bradford City (loan)	10	(1)
2017–2020	Twente	44	(15)
2020–2022	Zaragoza	17	(0)
2021–2022	→ Rijeka (loan)	27	(9)
2022	Rijeka	10	(3)
2023–2024	Buriram United	11	(3)
2024–2026	Domžale	32	(8)
2026	Al Hamriyah	14	(5)
2026–	Brinje Grosuplje	3	(2)

International career
2007–2009	Slovenia U17 (Note: Official UEFA competitive matches only.)	11	(4)
2009	Slovenia U19	4	(0)
2010–2014	Slovenia U21	16	(4)
2012–2021	Slovenia	12	(5)
- * Club domestic league appearances and goals as of 12 October 2026

Haris Vučkić (born 21 August 1992) is a Slovenian professional footballer who plays as a forward or attacking midfielder for Brinje Grosuplje.

Vučkić represented Slovenia internationally at youth level, before making his senior debut against Scotland on 29 February 2012. Overall, he earned a total of 12 senior caps, scoring 5 goals.

== Club career ==
=== Domžale ===
Born in Ljubljana, Slovenia, Vučkić played football at NK Domžale from Domžale, a small town in central Slovenia, during his youth.

A few months short of his 16th birthday, he made a debut for the club against Celje in a Slovenian PrvaLiga match on 24 May 2008, coming on as a late substitute. As he was too young to play according to the Football Association of Slovenia rules, his club was fined. After turning 16 in August 2008 he was finally promoted to the club's first squad where he would go on to play another four league games, before signing for English Premier League club Newcastle United.

=== Newcastle United ===
On 16 January 2009, it was confirmed that Vučkić would sign for Premier League side Newcastle United for a substantial fee and signed a three-and-a-half-year deal at St James' Park. At the time, he was regarded as one of Europe's brightest talents and reports suggested he underwent a trial at A.C. Milan.

Vučkić made his first appearance for Newcastle's reserve team on 16 February 2009 when he came off the bench to score the winning goal against Blackburn reserves, curling a left-footed shot into the bottom corner from 20 yards. He scored his first goal for the U18 team in his league debut in a 4–2 away win at Derby.

He has scored three goals altogether for the reserves, two league goals for the U18s and five more in 2009–10 pre-season friendlies. Vučkić made his Newcastle debut on 26 August 2009 as a late substitute in a League Cup tie with Huddersfield Town, where he played on the left wing. Five days later, Vučkić came off the bench to replace striker Nile Ranger in a 1–0 victory over Leicester City. This was to be his first league appearance for the club.

Vučkić scored his first senior goal for Newcastle against Carlisle United in a friendly on 17 July 2010 with a curled effort into the bottom left hand corner. In the 2010–2011 campaign, Newcastle manager Chris Hughton gave many of the youngsters a chance in the Football League Cup, Vučkić played in the second round tie against Accrington Stanley in central midfield alongside fellow youngster Ryan Donaldson. After Newcastle progressed with a 3–2 victory, he played in the third round away game to Chelsea, where Newcastle overcame expectations to win 4–3 in a thrilling encounter. He continued his impressive display against Arsenal in the League Cup fourth round getting the Man of the Match award despite Newcastle losing 4–0. In January 2011, Vučkić signed a new five-and-a-half-year contract with Newcastle.

On 26 July 2011, Vučkić went on to score again for Newcastle, scoring the final goal in a 3–0 win over MLS side Columbus Crew. In Newcastle's next pre-season friendly against Leeds United at Elland Road, Vučkić went on to score Newcastle's second goal and provided an impressive display since coming on despite Newcastle losing the game 3–2. He made his Premier League debut on 28 August 2011 against Fulham as a 78th-minute substitute, but was himself substituted seven minutes later with a suspected dislocated finger. He made his comeback for the team as a substitute four months later in a 0–0 draw with Swansea City. He went on to make his first Premiership start for Newcastle against West Bromwich Albion on 21 December and won plaudits for his performance, which included hitting the woodwork from 30 yards and forcing a fine save from the opposition goalkeeper.

On 30 August, Vučkić made his continental debut for Newcastle, coming on as a substitute for an injured Ryan Taylor against Greek side Atromitos, scoring the winning goal in the process, sending Newcastle through to the UEFA Europa League group stages.

==== Loan to Cardiff City ====
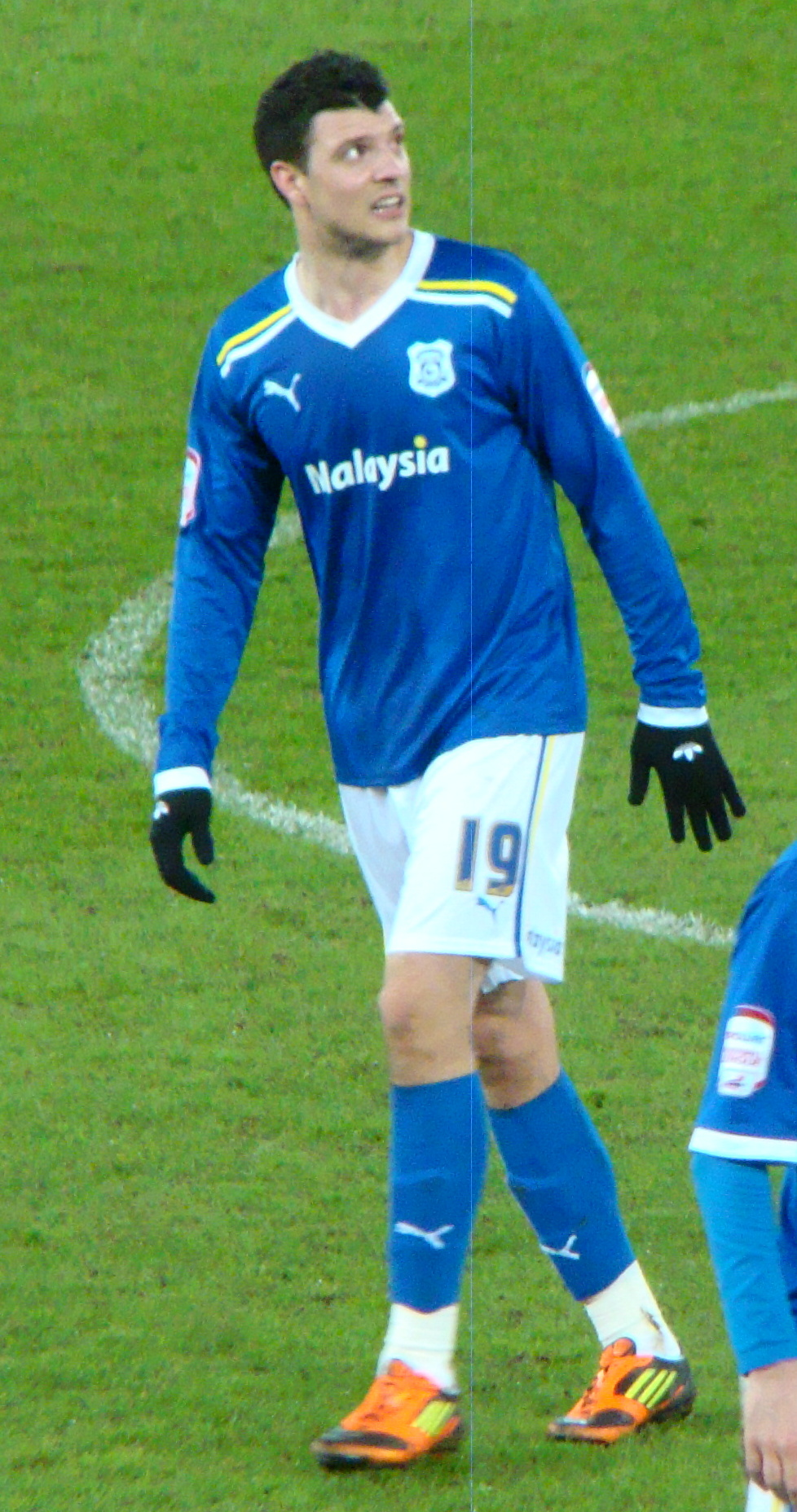
Vučkić playing for Cardiff City in February 2012

On 9 February 2012, Vučkić joined Cardiff City on a one-month loan. He made his debut in the 2–1 loss to Leicester City on 11 February, but only managed to stay on half the game before being substituted. He scored his first professional goal the following game against Peterborough United. He returned to Newcastle on 12 March, due to injuries at the club and both player and Cardiff wanted him to return to the club however this didn't materialise due to consistent injuries at Newcastle.

==== Loan to Rotherham United ====
On 28 November 2013, Vučkić joined League One side Rotherham United on loan until 2 January 2014. He scored his first goal for the club in a 1–0 win over Bradford City on 26 December 2013. By the end of January 2014, Rotherham extended Vučkić's loan deal to the end of the season, during which time he helped them defeat Leyton Orient in the play-off final at Wembley to win promotion to the Championship.

==== Loan to Rangers ====
On 2 February 2015, Vučkić was one of five Newcastle players who signed for then Scottish Championship side Rangers on loan until the end of the 2014–15 season. Vučkić had spoken with Newcastle manager John Carver before deciding to move to Scotland; "I wasn't in his plans at the moment and he advised me to go and play football." He scored on his debut for Rangers, a 2–1 defeat against Raith Rovers in the Scottish Cup on 8 February 2015 and went on to score nine more goals before returning to Tyneside.

==== Loan to Wigan Athletic ====
Vučkić joined Wigan Athletic on a season-long loan in September 2015.

==== Loan to Bradford City ====
On the last day of the summer transfer window 2016, Vučkić was reunited with former Rangers boss Stuart McCall at Bradford City on a six-month loan deal. He scored his first goal for Bradford in an EFL Trophy tie against Bury on 4 October 2016. The loan ended on 3 January 2017.

=== Twente ===
On 23 June 2017, Vučkić signed for Dutch side Twente on a free transfer.

=== Real Zaragoza ===
On 19 August 2020, Vučkić signed a three-year contract with Spanish side Real Zaragoza.

== International career ==
In September 2008, Vučkić played for the Slovenia under-17 team in the 2009 UEFA European Under-17 Championship qualifiers, where he scored three goals in three games against Turkey, Russia and Malta. Despite being only 16 years old, Vučkić played for the Slovenia under-19 team during the finals of the 2009 UEFA European Under-19 Championship, held in Ukraine in July 2009.

On 10 August 2010, Vučkić made his first appearance for the Slovenia under-21 team.

On 1 October 2010, he was summoned into a 23-man squad of the Slovenia senior team for the UEFA Euro 2012 qualifying matches against Faroe Islands and Estonia, scheduled for 8 and 12 October 2010. Vučkić did not feature in the match against Faroe Islands and did not travel to Estonia as he had returned to the under-21 team before that.

Vučkić made his debut for the senior national team on 29 February 2012, replacing Valter Birsa in the 61st minute in a friendly match against Scotland.

On 7 October 2020, he scored his first goal in a 4–0 victory over San Marino.

== Personal life ==
Vučkić is the younger brother of Alen, who is also a footballer. Vučkić was born in Ljubljana, Slovenia. As his father is of Bosnian descent, it was reported that Bosnia and Herzegovina wanted him on their team. However, Vučkić has rejected the claims of Bosnian media that he is about to switch national allegiances to Bosnia and stated that he is a Slovenian national team player and will be the same in the future. He has also made public statements saying that he will always be available for the Slovenia national team selections if called upon. After continuous pressure from both the media and the fans – primarily from Bosnia – upon the then 18-year-old, he made an open statement about the matter:

I will not hide that I am proud of my ancestry. I am proud of the fact that I am Bosnian thanks to my parents, but I am equally proud of the fact that I was born and grew up in Slovenia. Yes, I am proud of being Slovenian as well and Slovenia is my country. I made my first steps here, went to school here and have all my friends here. It would be very hard to say no to Slovenia, although it is nice to know that someone else wants you too, as that means I am on the right track, however, I never had any doubts on whom I want to play for. Rumours that are being spread in public do not concern me as I have decided a long time ago on whom I wish to play for.

— Haris Vučkić when asked if he would follow the example of certain players who were born and raised in one country but played for another.

== Career statistics ==
=== Club ===
As of 7 December 2022

Appearances and goals by club, season and competition
Club	Season	League			National cup		League cup		Continental		Other		Total	
Club	Season	Division	Apps	Goals	Apps	Goals	Apps	Goals	Apps	Goals	Apps	Goals	Apps	Goals
Domžale	2007–08	Slovenian PrvaLiga	1	0	0	0	—		0	0	0	0	1	0
Domžale	2008–09	Slovenian PrvaLiga	4	0	0	0	—		0	0	0	0	4	0
Domžale	Total		5	0	0	0	—		0	0	0	0	5	0
Newcastle United	2008–09	Premier League	0	0	0	0	0	0	—		—		0	0
Newcastle United	2009–10	Championship	2	0	0	0	2	0	—		—		4	0
Newcastle United	2010–11	Premier League	0	0	0	0	3	0	—		—		3	0
Newcastle United	2011–12	Premier League	4	0	0	0	1	0	—		—		5	0
Newcastle United	2012–13	Premier League	0	0	0	0	1	0	2 (Note: Appearance(s) in UEFA Europa League)	1	—		3	1
Newcastle United	2013–14	Premier League	0	0	0	0	1	0	—		—		1	0
Newcastle United	2014–15	Premier League	1	0	1	0	1	0	—		—		3	0
Newcastle United	Total		7	0	1	0	9	0	2	1	0	0	19	1
Cardiff City (loan)	2011–12	Championship	5	1	0	0	0	0	—		—		5	1
Rotherham United (loan)	2013–14	League One	22	4	0	0	0	0	—		4 (Note: Appearance(s) in Football League One play-offs)	0	26	4
Rangers (loan)	2014–15	Scottish Championship	15	8	1	1	0	0	—		6 (Note: Appearance(s) in Scottish Championship play-offs)	0	22	9
Wigan Athletic (loan)	2015–16	League One	15	2	1	0	0	0	—		1 (Note: Appearance(s) in Football League Trophy)	0	17	2
Bradford City (loan)	2016–17	League One	10	1	1	0	0	0	—		3	3	14	4
Twente	2017–18	Eredivisie	12	3	3	1	—		—		—		15	4
Twente	2018–19	Eerste Divisie	7	1	0	0	—		—		—		7	1
Twente	2019–20	Eredivisie	25	11	1	0	—		—		—		26	11
Twente	Total		44	15	4	1	0	0	0	0	0	0	48	16
Real Zaragoza	2020–21	Segunda División	17	0	2	0	—		—		—		19	0
Rijeka (loan)	2021–22	1. HNL	27	9	3	2	—		1 (Note: Appearance(s) in UEFA Europa Conference League)	0	—		31	11
Rijeka	2022–23	HNL	10	3	0	0	—		2	1	—		12	4
Rijeka	Total		37	12	3	2	0	0	3	1	0	0	43	15
Career total			177	43	13	4	9	0	5	2	14	3	218	52

=== International ===
Appearances and goals by national team and year
National team	Year	Apps	Goals
Slovenia
Slovenia	2012	1	0
Slovenia	2019	2	0
Slovenia	2020	7	5
Slovenia	2021	2	0
Total		12	5

Scores and results list Slovenia's goal tally first, score column indicates score after each Vučkić goal.

List of international goals scored by Haris Vučkić
No.	Date	Venue	Cap	Opponent	Score	Result	Competition
1	7 October 2020	Stožice Stadium, Ljubljana, Slovenia	6	San Marino	2–0	4–0	Friendly
2	11 October 2020	Fadil Vokrri Stadium, Pristina, Kosovo	7	Kosovo	1–0	1–0	2020–21 UEFA Nations League C
3	14 October 2020	Zimbru Stadium, Chișinău, Moldova	8	Moldova	2–0	4–0	2020–21 UEFA Nations League C
4	14 October 2020	Zimbru Stadium, Chișinău, Moldova	8	Moldova	3–0	4–0	2020–21 UEFA Nations League C
5	14 October 2020	Zimbru Stadium, Chișinău, Moldova	8	Moldova	4–0	4–0	2020–21 UEFA Nations League C

== Honours ==
Rotherham United

- Football League One play-offs: 2014

Wigan Athletic

- Football League One: 2015–16

Twente

- Eerste Divisie: 2018–19

Buriram United

- Thai League 1: 2022–23
- Thai FA Cup: 2022–23
- Thai League Cup: 2022–23
