= Luciano Slagveer =

Dutch footballer (born 1993)

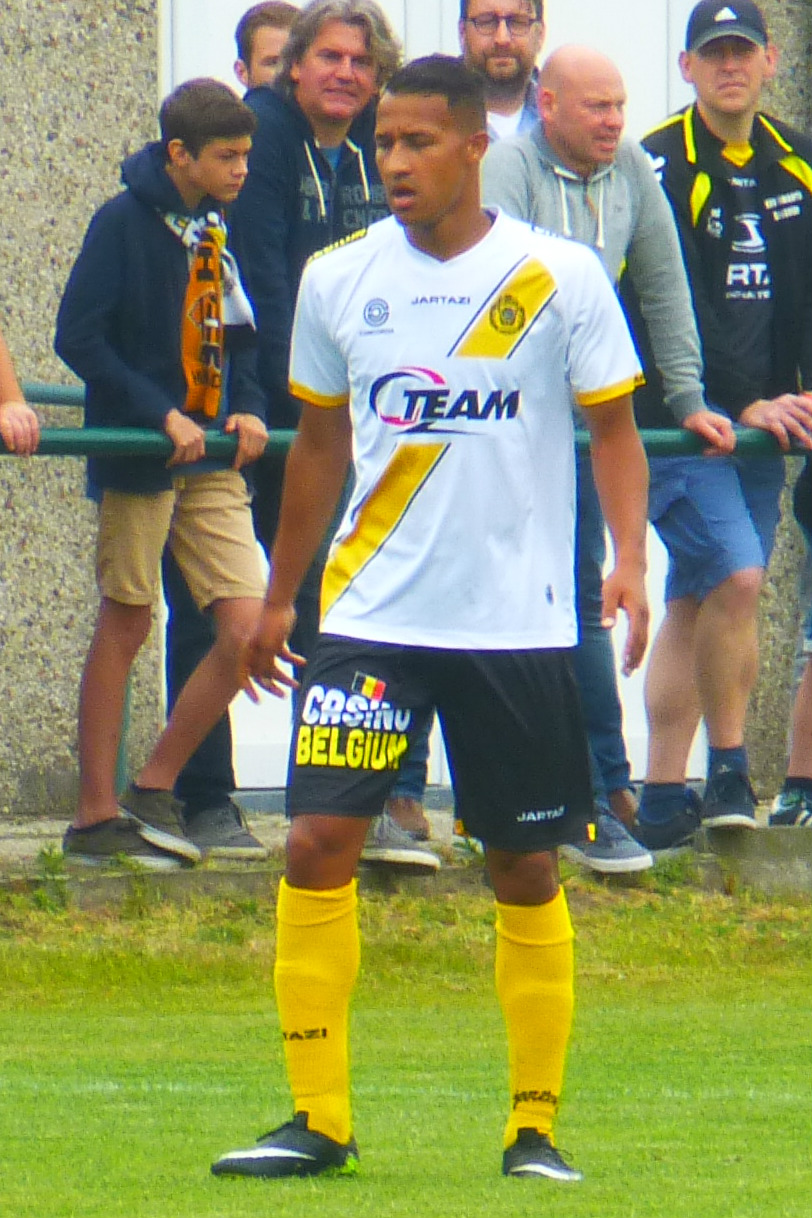
- Slagveer with Lokeren in 2017

Personal information
- Date of birth: 5 October 1993 (age 33)
- Place of birth: Rotterdam, Netherlands
- Height: 1.78 m (5 ft 10 in)
- Position: Right winger

Team information
- Current team: Sparta Nijkerk

Youth career
- –2012: SC Heerenveen

Senior career*
Years	Team	Apps	(Gls)
2013–2017	SC Heerenveen	117	(22)
2017–2019	Lokeren	3	(0)
2017–2018	→ FC Twente (loan)	19	(1)
2018–2019	→ FC Emmen (loan)	24	(3)
2019–2020	FC Emmen	9	(2)
2020–2024	Puskás Akadémia	107	(13)
2025–2026	TOP Oss	40	(3)
2026–	Sparta Nijkerk	0	(0)

International career^{‡}
2010	Netherlands U17	7	(0)
2010	Netherlands U18	1	(1)
2012	Netherlands U19	1	(0)
2012–2013	Netherlands U20	2	(0)
2013	Netherlands U21	2	(0)
2024	Suriname	1	(0)
- * Club domestic league appearances and goals as of 28 April 2026 ‡ National team caps and goals as of 24 March 2024

Luciano Slagveer (born 5 October 1993) is a professional footballer who plays as a winger for Derde Divisie club Sparta Nijkerk. Born in the Netherlands, he plays for the Suriname national team.

== Club career ==
On 4 February 2025, Slagveer signed a contract with TOP Oss for six months, with a club option to extend for another year.

== Personal life ==
Slagveer is of Surinamese descent.

== Career statistics ==
=== Club ===
As of match played 20 March 2026

Appearances and goals by club, season and competition
Club	Season	League			National cup (Note: Includes KNVB Cup, Belgian Cup and Magyar Kupa)		Continental		Other		Total	
Club	Season	Division	Apps	Goals	Apps	Goals	Apps	Goals	Apps	Goals	Apps	Goals
SC Heerenveen	2012–13	Eredivisie	2	0	1	1	0	0	1 (Note: Appearance(s) in Eredivisie European competition play-offs)	0	4	1
SC Heerenveen	2013–14	Eredivisie	25	2	2	1	—		2	1	29	4
SC Heerenveen	2014–15	Eredivisie	33	11	1	0	—		4	1	38	12
SC Heerenveen	2015–16	Eredivisie	30	5	3	0	—		—		33	5
SC Heerenveen	2016–17	Eredivisie	27	4	3	0	—		2	0	32	4
SC Heerenveen	Total		117	22	10	2	0	0	9	2	136	26
Lokeren	2017–18	Belgian First Division A	3	0	0	0	—		0	0	3	0
Lokeren	2018–19	Belgian First Division A	0	0	0	0	—		—		0	0
Lokeren	Total		3	0	0	0	—		0	0	3	0
FC Twente (loan)	2017–18	Eredivisie	19	1	1	0	—		—		20	1
FC Emmen (loan)	2018–19	Eredivisie	24	3	2	0	—		—		26	3
FC Emmen	2019–20	Eredivisie	9	2	1	0	—		—		10	2
Puskás Akadémia	2019–20	NB I	16	2	4	2	—		—		20	4
Puskás Akadémia	2020–21	NB I	28	4	1	0	0	0	—		29	4
Puskás Akadémia	2021–22	NB I	25	2	1	0	4 (Note: Appearance(s) in UEFA Europa Conference League)	0	—		30	2
Puskás Akadémia	2022–23	NB I	18	4	5	2	1	0	—		24	6
Puskás Akadémia	2023–24	NB I	20	1	1	0	—		—		21	1
Puskás Akadémia	Total		107	13	12	4	5	0	—		124	17
Puskás Akadémia II	2021–22	NB III	1	1	—		—		—		1	1
TOP Oss	2024–25	Eerste Divisie	13	0	—		—		—		13	0
TOP Oss	2025–26	Eerste Divisie	22	2	2	0	—		—		24	2
TOP Oss	Total		35	2	2	0	—		—		37	2
Career total			315	44	28	6	5	0	9	2	357	52

=== International ===
As of match played 24 March 2024

Appearances and goals by national team and year
National team	Year	Apps	Goals
Suriname	2024	1	0
Total		1	0
