= 2013 UEFA European Under-21 Championship squads =

Football team member listings

This article lists the squads for the 2013 UEFA European Under-21 Championship that was hosted in Israel. Only players born on or after 1 January 1990 were eligible to play.

Each participating team had to submit a list of forty players, including no fewer than four goalkeepers, thirty days before the opening match. This then had to be reduced to a final squad of 23 players by 26 May 2013. Players born no earlier than 1 January 1990 were eligible for the tournament, meaning some participants were 23 years old as the 'under-21' limit applied at the start of the qualifying competition.

Players in boldface have been capped at full international level at some point in their career.

† Players with a dagger had been given a full international cap by their country prior to the start of the tournament.

Age, caps, goals and club as of 5 June 2013.

== Group A ==
=== England ===
Head coach: Stuart Pearce

England named their squad on 14 May 2013. Callum McManaman was ruled out with injury and replaced by Nathan Delfouneso on 17 May. Andros Townsend and Luke Shaw were replaced by Nathan Redmond and Jack Robinson, due to withdrawal and injury respectively, on 24 May.

No.	Pos.	Player	Date of birth (age)	Caps	Goals	Club
1	GK	**Jack Butland** †	10 March 1993 (aged 20)	9	0	(England) Stoke City
2	DF	**Nathaniel Clyne**	5 April 1991 (aged 22)	6	0	(England) Southampton
3	DF	Adam Smith	29 April 1991 (aged 22)	10	0	(England) Tottenham Hotspur
4	DF	**Steven Caulker** † (Note: Capped for Sierra Leone)	29 December 1991 (aged 21)	8	2	(England) Tottenham Hotspur
5	DF	Andre Wisdom	9 May 1993 (aged 20)	5	0	(England) Liverpool
6	DF	Craig Dawson	6 May 1990 (aged 23)	13	5	(England) West Bromwich Albion
7	DF	Tom Lees	18 November 1990 (aged 22)	5	0	(England) Leeds United
8	MF	**Jordan Henderson** (captain) †	17 June 1990 (aged 22)	24	4	(England) Liverpool
9	DF	Jack Robinson	1 September 1993 (aged 19)	4	1	(England) Liverpool
10	DF	Jason Lowe	2 September 1991 (aged 21)	9	0	(England) Blackburn Rovers
11	MF	**Danny Rose**	2 July 1990 (aged 22)	27	3	(England) Tottenham Hotspur
12	MF	**Nathaniel Chalobah**	12 December 1994 (aged 18)	4	0	(England) Chelsea
13	GK	Jason Steele	18 August 1990 (aged 22)	6	0	(England) Middlesbrough
14	MF	Josh McEachran	1 March 1993 (aged 20)	11	1	(England) Chelsea
15	MF	**Wilfried Zaha** † (Note: Capped for Ivory Coast)	10 November 1992 (aged 20)	7	1	(England) Manchester United
16	MF	Tom Ince	30 January 1992 (aged 21)	6	2	(England) Blackpool
17	MF	Henri Lansbury	12 October 1990 (aged 22)	16	5	(England) Nottingham Forest
18	MF	**Jonjo Shelvey** †	27 February 1992 (aged 21)	9	3	(England) Liverpool
19	MF	**Nathan Redmond**	6 March 1994 (aged 19)	0	0	(England) Birmingham City
20	FW	Nathan Delfouneso	2 February 1991 (aged 22)	16	4	(England) Aston Villa
21	FW	Marvin Sordell	17 February 1991 (aged 22)	12	3	(England) Bolton Wanderers
22	FW	Connor Wickham	31 March 1993 (aged 20)	13	5	(England) Sunderland
23	GK	Declan Rudd	16 January 1991 (aged 22)	1	0	(England) Norwich City

=== Israel ===
Head coach: Guy Luzon

Israel named their squad on 23 May 2013.

No.	Pos.	Player	Date of birth (age)	Caps	Goals	Club
1	GK	**Boris Klaiman**	26 October 1990 (aged 22)	17	0	(Israel) Hapoel Tel Aviv
2	DF	**Eli Dasa**	3 December 1992 (aged 20)	12	2	(Israel) Beitar Jerusalem
3	DF	**Ofir Davidzada**	5 May 1991 (aged 22)	12	0	(Israel) Hapoel Be'er Sheva
4	DF	Ido Levy	31 July 1990 (aged 22)	11	0	(Israel) Maccabi Netanya
5	DF	Ben Vehava	27 March 1992 (aged 21)	4	0	(Israel) Hapoel Be'er Sheva
6	MF	**Marwan Kabha**	23 February 1991 (aged 22)	16	3	(Israel) Maccabi Petah Tikva
7	MF	Yisrael Zaguri	29 January 1990 (aged 23)	4	0	(Israel) Hapoel Ramat Gan
8	DF	**Nir Bitton** (captain) †	30 October 1991 (aged 21)	17	1	(Israel) Ashdod
9	FW	Mohammed Kalibat	15 June 1990 (aged 22)	14	4	(Israel) Bnei Sakhnin
10	MF	**Eyal Golasa** †	7 October 1991 (aged 21)	17	1	(Israel) Maccabi Haifa
11	FW	**Mu'nas Dabbur**	14 May 1992 (aged 21)	10	4	(Israel) Maccabi Tel Aviv
12	DF	Adi Gotlieb	16 August 1992 (aged 20)	5	0	(Israel) Hapoel Acco
13	DF	**Taleb Tawatha** †	21 June 1992 (aged 20)	5	0	(Israel) Maccabi Haifa
14	FW	Orr Barouch	21 November 1991 (aged 21)	8	4	(Israel) Bnei Yehuda
15	FW	**Alon Turgeman**	9 June 1991 (aged 21)	7	0	(Israel) Maccabi Haifa
16	DF	Ofer Verta	23 May 1990 (aged 23)	9	0	(Israel) Ashdod
17	MF	Sintayehu Sallalich	20 June 1991 (aged 21)	8	1	(Israel) Ironi Kiryat Shmona
18	GK	Barak Levi	7 January 1993 (aged 20)	0	0	(Israel) Maccabi Tel Aviv
19	MF	Ahad Azam	14 January 1992 (aged 21)	6	0	(Israel) Hapoel Haifa
20	DF	**Omri Ben Harush** †	7 March 1990 (aged 23)	16	0	(Israel) Maccabi Netanya
21	MF	**Omri Altman**	23 March 1994 (aged 19)	10	4	(England) Fulham
22	MF	Ofir Kriaf	17 March 1991 (aged 22)	8	1	(Israel) Beitar Jerusalem
23	GK	Arik Yanko	21 December 1991 (aged 21)	0	0	(Israel) Hakoah Ramat Gan

=== Italy ===
Heach coach: Devis Mangia

Italy named their squad on 27 May 2013.

No.	Pos.	Player	Date of birth (age)	Caps	Goals	Club
1	GK	Francesco Bardi	18 January 1992 (aged 21)	13	0	(Italy) Novara
2	DF	Giulio Donati	5 February 1990 (aged 23)	19	0	(Italy) Grosseto
3	DF	**Cristiano Biraghi**	1 September 1992 (aged 20)	5	0	(Italy) Cittadella
4	MF	**Marco Verratti**	5 November 1992 (aged 20)	3	0	(France) Paris Saint-Germain
5	DF	Marco Capuano	14 October 1991 (aged 21)	17	0	(Italy) Pescara
6	DF	Luca Caldirola (captain)	1 February 1991 (aged 22)	26	1	(Italy) Cesena
7	MF	**Alessandro Florenzi**	11 March 1991 (aged 22)	13	4	(Italy) Roma
8	MF	Luca Marrone	28 March 1990 (aged 23)	30	1	(Italy) Juventus
9	FW	**Ciro Immobile**	20 February 1990 (aged 23)	12	7	(Italy) Genoa
10	MF	**Lorenzo Insigne**	4 June 1991 (aged 22)	11	6	(Italy) Napoli
11	FW	**Manolo Gabbiadini**	26 November 1991 (aged 21)	19	10	(Italy) Bologna
12	GK	Simone Colombi	1 July 1991 (aged 21)	2	0	(Italy) Modena
13	DF	Matteo Bianchetti	17 March 1993 (aged 20)	4	0	(Italy) Hellas Verona
14	FW	**Mattia Destro**	20 March 1991 (aged 22)	14	5	(Italy) Roma
15	MF	**Nicola Sansone**	10 September 1991 (aged 21)	2	0	(Italy) Parma
16	MF	**Andrea Bertolacci**	11 January 1991 (aged 22)	6	0	(Italy) Genoa
17	FW	Alberto Paloschi	4 January 1990 (aged 23)	28	9	(Italy) Chievo
18	MF	Riccardo Saponara	21 December 1991 (aged 21)	19	2	(Italy) Milan
19	DF	Vasco Regini	9 September 1990 (aged 22)	2	0	(Italy) Empoli
20	FW	**Fabio Borini**	29 March 1991 (aged 22)	15	4	(England) Liverpool
21	MF	Fausto Rossi	3 December 1990 (aged 22)	20	1	(Italy) Brescia
22	GK	Nicola Leali	30 June 1993 (aged 19)	0	0	(Italy) Virtus Lanciano
23	MF	Marco Crimi	17 March 1990 (aged 23)	9	0	(Italy) Grosseto

=== Norway ===
Head coach: Tor Ole Skullerud

Norway named their squad on 22 May 2013. Alexander Groven withdrew from the squad due to injury on 27 May, and was replaced by Markus Henriksen, who had originally been omitted in order to play for the senior side in their World Cup qualifier against Albania on 7 June. Håvard Nordtveit, Valon Berisha and Joshua King were also selected for the qualifier, meaning all four played were ruled out of the opening group game of the tournament.

No.	Pos.	Player	Date of birth (age)	Caps	Goals	Club
1	GK	Arild Østbø	19 April 1991 (aged 22)	17	0	(Norway) Strømmen
2	DF	**Martin Linnes**	20 September 1991 (aged 21)	5	0	(Norway) Molde
3	DF	**Thomas Rogne** †	29 June 1990 (aged 22)	15	2	(Scotland) Celtic
4	DF	**Stefan Strandberg** (captain)	25 July 1990 (aged 22)	21	0	(Norway) Rosenborg
5	DF	**Vegar Eggen Hedenstad** †	26 June 1991 (aged 21)	20	0	(Germany) SC Freiburg
6	DF	**Omar Elabdellaoui**	5 December 1991 (aged 21)	11	1	(Germany) Eintracht Braunschweig
7	MF	**Harmeet Singh** †	12 November 1990 (aged 22)	35	4	(Netherlands) Feyenoord
8	FW	**Jo Inge Berget** †	11 September 1990 (aged 22)	19	5	(Norway) Molde
9	FW	**Valon Berisha** † (Note: Capped for Kosovo)	7 February 1993 (aged 20)	11	2	(Austria) Red Bull Salzburg
10	FW	**Marcus Pedersen** †	8 June 1990 (aged 22)	17	6	(Denmark) OB
11	FW	**Håvard Nielsen** †	15 July 1993 (aged 19)	7	3	(Austria) Red Bull Salzburg
12	GK	**Ørjan Nyland**	10 September 1990 (aged 22)	5	0	(Norway) Molde
13	MF	**Markus Henriksen** †	25 July 1992 (aged 20)	8	2	(Netherlands) AZ
14	DF	**Fredrik Semb Berge** †	6 February 1990 (aged 23)	9	0	(Norway) Odd
15	MF	**Håvard Nordtveit** †	21 June 1990 (aged 22)	21	1	(Germany) Borussia Mönchengladbach
16	FW	**Yann-Erik de Lanlay** †	14 May 1992 (aged 21)	8	1	(Norway) Viking
17	MF	**Anders Konradsen** †	18 July 1990 (aged 22)	12	1	(France) Rennes
18	MF	**Magnus Wolff Eikrem** †	8 August 1990 (aged 22)	8	1	(Norway) Molde
19	FW	**Flamur Kastrati**	14 November 1991 (aged 21)	10	3	(Germany) Erzgebirge Aue
20	MF	**Stefan Johansen**	8 January 1991 (aged 22)	3	0	(Norway) Strømsgodset
21	FW	**Joshua King** †	15 January 1992 (aged 21)	6	1	(England) Blackburn Rovers
22	MF	**Abdisalam Ibrahim**	1 May 1991 (aged 22)	11	0	(Norway) Strømsgodset
23	GK	Gudmund Kongshavn	23 January 1991 (aged 22)	0	0	(Norway) Vålerenga

== Group B ==
=== Germany ===
Head coach: Rainer Adrion

Germany named a 25-man squad on 16 May 2013. Antonio Rüdiger was added to their squad on 24 May after Jan Kirchhoff was ruled with injury. Germany confirmed their final squad on 28 May, with original party members Tolgay Arslan and Sebastian Jung also out injured.

No.	Pos.	Player	Date of birth (age)	Caps	Goals	Club
1	GK	**Bernd Leno**	4 March 1992 (aged 21)	7	0	(Germany) Bayer Leverkusen
2	DF	Tony Jantschke	7 April 1990 (aged 23)	15	0	(Germany) Borussia Mönchengladbach
3	DF	Stefan Thesker	11 April 1991 (aged 22)	4	0	(Germany) 1899 Hoffenheim
4	DF	Lasse Sobiech	18 January 1991 (aged 22)	15	2	(Germany) Greuther Fürth
5	DF	**Shkodran Mustafi** †	17 April 1992 (aged 21)	1	0	(Italy) Sampdoria
6	MF	**Sebastian Rudy**	28 February 1990 (aged 23)	20	3	(Germany) 1899 Hoffenheim
7	MF	Patrick Funk	11 February 1990 (aged 23)	14	1	(Germany) FC St. Pauli
8	MF	Sebastian Rode	11 October 1990 (aged 22)	3	0	(Germany) Eintracht Frankfurt
9	FW	**Kevin Volland** †	30 July 1992 (aged 20)	7	3	(Germany) 1899 Hoffenheim
10	MF	**Lewis Holtby** †	18 September 1990 (aged 22)	21	13	(England) Tottenham Hotspur
11	FW	**Peniel Mlapa** (Note: Capped for Togo)	20 February 1991 (aged 22)	20	8	(Germany) Borussia Mönchengladbach
12	GK	Oliver Baumann	2 June 1990 (aged 23)	9	0	(Germany) SC Freiburg
13	DF	**Matthias Ginter** †	19 January 1994 (aged 19)	0	0	(Germany) SC Freiburg
14	FW	Sebastian Polter	1 April 1991 (aged 22)	8	4	(Germany) 1. FC Nürnberg
15	DF	**Sead Kolašinac** (Note: Capped for Bosnia and Herzegovina)	20 June 1993 (aged 19)	0	0	(Germany) Schalke 04
16	DF	**Oliver Sorg** †	29 May 1990 (aged 23)	3	0	(Germany) SC Freiburg
17	DF	**Antonio Rüdiger**	3 March 1993 (aged 20)	2	0	(Germany) VfB Stuttgart
18	MF	**Patrick Herrmann**	12 February 1991 (aged 22)	11	2	(Germany) Borussia Mönchengladbach
19	MF	Christian Clemens	4 August 1991 (aged 21)	2	0	(Germany) 1. FC Köln
20	MF	Christoph Moritz	27 January 1990 (aged 23)	7	0	(Germany) Schalke 04
21	FW	Pierre-Michel Lasogga	15 December 1991 (aged 21)	9	4	(Germany) Hertha BSC
22	MF	**Emre Can**	12 January 1994 (aged 19)	0	0	(Germany) Bayern Munich
23	GK	Timo Horn	12 May 1993 (aged 20)	0	0	(Germany) 1. FC Köln

=== Netherlands ===
Head coach: Cor Pot

Netherlands named their squad on 17 May 2013. Jürgen Locadia was ruled out with injury and replaced by Danny Hoesen on 27 May.

No.	Pos.	Player	Date of birth (age)	Caps	Goals	Club
1	GK	**Jeroen Zoet**	6 January 1991 (aged 22)	18	0	(Netherlands) RKC Waalwijk
2	DF	**Ricardo van Rhijn** †	13 June 1991 (aged 21)	6	0	(Netherlands) Ajax
3	DF	**Stefan de Vrij** †	5 February 1992 (aged 21)	9	0	(Netherlands) Feyenoord
4	DF	**Bruno Martins Indi** †	8 February 1992 (aged 21)	5	0	(Netherlands) Feyenoord
5	DF	**Daley Blind** †	9 March 1990 (aged 23)	20	0	(Netherlands) Ajax
6	MF	**Jordy Clasie** †	27 June 1991 (aged 21)	10	1	(Netherlands) Feyenoord
7	FW	**Florian Jozefzoon** (Note: Capped for Suriname)	9 February 1991 (aged 22)	3	0	(Netherlands) RKC Waalwijk
8	MF	**Kevin Strootman** †	13 February 1990 (aged 23)	9	1	(Netherlands) PSV Eindhoven
9	FW	**Luuk de Jong** †	27 August 1990 (aged 22)	15	4	(Germany) Borussia Mönchengladbach
10	MF	**Adam Maher** †	20 July 1993 (aged 19)	7	1	(Netherlands) AZ
11	FW	**Ola John** †	19 May 1992 (aged 21)	5	0	(Portugal) Benfica
12	MF	**Kelvin Leerdam**	24 June 1990 (aged 22)	18	1	(Netherlands) Feyenoord
13	DF	Mike van der Hoorn	15 October 1992 (aged 20)	2	0	(Netherlands) Utrecht
14	DF	Bram Nuytinck	4 May 1990 (aged 23)	22	2	(Belgium) Anderlecht
15	MF	**Georginio Wijnaldum** †	11 November 1990 (aged 22)	21	8	(Netherlands) PSV Eindhoven
16	GK	**Marco Bizot**	10 March 1991 (aged 22)	6	0	(Netherlands) Groningen
17	MF	**Leroy Fer** †	5 January 1990 (aged 23)	27	4	(Netherlands) Twente
18	MF	**Marco van Ginkel** †	1 December 1992 (aged 20)	14	3	(Netherlands) Vitesse
19	MF	**Tonny Vilhena**	3 January 1995 (aged 18)	2	1	(Netherlands) Feyenoord
20	DF	**Patrick van Aanholt**	29 August 1990 (aged 22)	15	0	(Netherlands) Vitesse
21	FW	Danny Hoesen	15 January 1991 (aged 22)	1	1	(Netherlands) Ajax
22	FW	**Memphis Depay**	13 February 1994 (aged 19)	1	0	(Netherlands) PSV Eindhoven
23	GK	Nick Marsman	1 October 1990 (aged 22)	0	0	(Netherlands) Go Ahead Eagles

=== Russia ===
Head coach: Nikolai Pisarev

Russia named their squad on 28 May 2013. Alan Dzagoev, Oleg Shatov and Aleksandr Kokorin were all named despite having to miss the opening game in order to play for the full international side. Kokorin was ruled out with injury on 31 May, while Shatov was subsequently released from the senior squad for the start of the tournament.

No.	Pos.	Player	Date of birth (age)	Caps	Goals	Club
1	GK	Nikolai Zabolotny	16 April 1990 (aged 23)	19	0	(Russia) Rostov
2	DF	Ibragim Tsallagov	12 December 1990 (aged 22)	16	0	(Russia) Krylia Sovetov Samara
3	DF	**Georgi Shchennikov** †	27 April 1991 (aged 22)	18	1	(Russia) CSKA Moscow
4	DF	Nikita Chicherin	18 August 1990 (aged 22)	16	0	(Russia) Dynamo Moscow
5	DF	**Taras Burlak** †	22 February 1990 (aged 23)	14	2	(Russia) Lokomotiv Moscow
6	MF	Yuri Kirillov	19 January 1990 (aged 23)	14	1	(Russia) Dynamo Moscow
7	MF	**Sergei Petrov**	2 January 1991 (aged 22)	11	0	(Russia) Krasnodar
8	FW	**Oleg Shatov** †	29 July 1990 (aged 22)	15	3	(Russia) Anzhi Makhachkala
9	FW	Andrei Panyukov	25 September 1994 (aged 18)	6	6	(Russia) Khimki
10	FW	**Fyodor Smolov** †	9 February 1990 (aged 23)	27	14	(Russia) Anzhi Makhachkala
11	FW	**Maksim Kanunnikov**	14 July 1991 (aged 21)	18	3	(Russia) Amkar Perm
12	GK	**Stanislav Kritsyuk**	1 December 1990 (aged 22)	0	0	(Portugal) Braga
13	DF	Sergei Bryzgalov	15 November 1992 (aged 20)	0	0	(Russia) Spartak Moscow
14	FW	Pavel Yakovlev	7 April 1991 (aged 22)	22	2	(Russia) Spartak Moscow
15	DF	**Maksim Belyayev**	30 September 1991 (aged 21)	6	0	(Russia) Rostov
16	GK	Aleksandr Filtsov	2 January 1990 (aged 23)	4	0	(Russia) Krasnodar
17	FW	**Denis Cheryshev** †	26 December 1990 (aged 22)	14	6	(Spain) Real Madrid Castilla
18	MF	Roman Yemelyanov	8 May 1992 (aged 21)	1	0	(Ukraine) Illichivets Mariupol
19	MF	**Maksim Grigoryev** †	6 July 1990 (aged 22)	8	1	(Russia) Lokomotiv Moscow
20	MF	Shota Bibilov	6 August 1990 (aged 22)	10	3	(Russia) Volga Nizhny Novgorod
21	MF	Aleksandr Zotov	27 August 1990 (aged 22)	8	0	(Russia) Tom Tomsk
22	FW	**Alan Dzagoev** †	17 June 1990 (aged 22)	0	0	(Russia) CSKA Moscow
23	DF	Ivan Knyazev	5 November 1992 (aged 20)	2	0	(Russia) Torpedo Moscow

=== Spain ===
Head coach: Julen Lopetegui

Spain named their squad on 23 May 2013.

No.	Pos.	Player	Date of birth (age)	Caps	Goals	Club
1	GK	**David de Gea**	7 November 1990 (aged 22)	22	0	(England) Manchester United
2	DF	Martín Montoya	14 April 1991 (aged 22)	18	1	(Spain) Barcelona
3	MF	**Asier Illarramendi**	8 March 1990 (aged 23)	11	0	(Spain) Real Sociedad
4	DF	**Nacho**	18 January 1990 (aged 23)	5	0	(Spain) Real Madrid
5	DF	**Marc Bartra**	15 January 1991 (aged 22)	12	2	(Spain) Barcelona
6	DF	**Iñigo Martínez**	17 May 1991 (aged 22)	10	0	(Spain) Real Sociedad
7	MF	**Sergio Canales**	16 February 1991 (aged 22)	9	6	(Spain) Valencia
8	MF	**Koke**	8 January 1992 (aged 21)	8	1	(Spain) Atlético Madrid
9	FW	**Rodrigo**	6 March 1991 (aged 22)	12	14	(Portugal) Benfica
10	MF	**Thiago** †	11 April 1991 (aged 22)	16	3	(Spain) Barcelona
11	FW	**Cristian Tello**	11 August 1991 (aged 21)	8	2	(Spain) Barcelona
12	FW	**Álvaro Morata**	23 October 1992 (aged 20)	0	0	(Spain) Real Madrid
13	GK	Diego Mariño	9 May 1990 (aged 23)	6	0	(Spain) Villarreal
14	MF	**Ignacio Camacho**	4 May 1990 (aged 23)	6	0	(Spain) Málaga
15	DF	Marc Muniesa	27 March 1992 (aged 21)	4	0	(Spain) Barcelona
16	DF	Álvaro	8 January 1990 (aged 23)	0	0	(Spain) Zaragoza
17	MF	**Pablo Sarabia**	11 May 1992 (aged 21)	11	2	(Spain) Getafe
18	DF	**Alberto Moreno**	5 July 1992 (aged 20)	2	0	(Spain) Sevilla
19	FW	**Iker Muniain** †	19 December 1992 (aged 20)	16	3	(Spain) Athletic Bilbao
20	DF	**Dani Carvajal**	11 January 1992 (aged 21)	2	0	(Spain) Real Madrid
21	FW	Álvaro Vázquez	27 April 1991 (aged 22)	13	6	(Spain) Getafe
22	MF	**Isco** †	21 April 1992 (aged 21)	11	6	(Spain) Málaga
23	GK	Joel Robles	17 June 1990 (aged 22)	2	0	(England) Wigan Athletic

== Player statistics ==
Player representation by club

Players	Clubs
6	(Netherlands) Feyenoord
5	(England) Liverpool, (Germany) Borussia Mönchengladbach, (Spain) Barcelona
4	(England) Tottenham Hotspur, (Germany) SC Freiburg, (Norway) Molde, (Spain) Real Madrid
3	(Germany) 1899 Hoffenheim, (Israel) Maccabi Haifa, (Netherlands) Ajax, (Netherlands) PSV Eindhoven
2	(Austria) Red Bull Salzburg, (England) Blackburn Rovers, (England) Chelsea, (England) Manchester United, (Germany) 1. FC Köln, (Germany) Schalke 04 (Israel) Ashdod, (Israel) Beitar Jerusalem, (Israel) Hapoel Be'er Sheva, (Israel) Maccabi Netanya, (Israel) Maccabi Tel Aviv, (Italy) Genoa, (Italy) Grosseto, (Italy) Roma, (Netherlands) AZ, (Netherlands) RKC Waalwijk, (Netherlands) Vitesse, (Norway) Strømsgodset, (Portugal) Benfica, (Russia) Anzhi Makhachkala, (Russia) CSKA Moscow, (Russia) Dynamo Moscow, (Russia) Krasnodar, (Russia) Lokomotiv Moscow, (Russia) Rostov, (Russia) Spartak Moscow, (Spain) Getafe, (Spain) , Málaga, (Spain) Real Sociedad
1	77 clubs

In total 118 clubs were represented in the tournament.

Player representation by league

Country	Players	Percentage	Outside national squad
England	29	15.76%	6
Germany	26	14.13%	5
Israel	22	11,96%	0
Italy	22	11.96%	1
Netherlands	22	11.96%	2
Spain	21	11.41%	1
Russia	20	10.87%	0
Norway	11	5.98%	0
Others (7 leagues)	11	5.98%	
**Total**	184		15

The English squad were made up entirely of players from the respective countries domestic leagues. Altogether, there were fifteen national leagues that had players in the tournament.

Average age of squads

Average age	Countries
21	England, Germany, Israel, Netherlands
22	Italy, Norway, Russia, Spain
