= Ryan Trotman =

Barbadian footballer

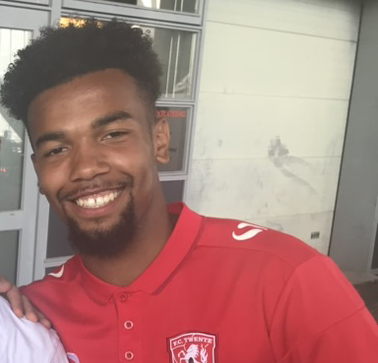

Personal information
- Full name: Ryan Lara Trotman
- Date of birth: 27 June 1999 (age 27)
- Place of birth: Enschede, Netherlands
- Height: 1.75 m (5 ft 9 in)
- Position: Forward

Team information
- Current team: Glacis United
- Number: 17

Youth career
- FC Twente

Senior career*
Years	Team	Apps	(Gls)
2017–2019	Jong FC Twente	7	(2)
2017–2019	FC Twente	1	(0)
2019–2022	FC Den Bosch	29	(5)
2022–2023	FK Kauno Žalgiris	12	(0)
2023–2024	Glacis United	15	(5)
2024–2025	Manchester 62	18	(4)
2025–2026	Europa	2	(0)
2026–	Glacis United	3	(1)

International career^{‡}
2021–	Barbados	7	(0)
- * Club domestic league appearances and goals as of 21 November 2026 ‡ National team caps and goals as of 16 October 2023

Ryan Lara Trotman (born 27 June 1999) is a professional footballer who plays as a forward. Born in the Netherlands, he represents Barbados internationally.

== Early life ==
Trotman was born in Enschede, Netherlands, as the son of the Barbadian cricketer Emmerson Trotman and a Dutch mother.

== Club career ==
Born in Enschede, Trotman started his career at Jong FC Twente, making his debut for the club on 6 May 2018 in a 1–1 Eredivisie draw at home to NAC Breda. In July 2019, Trotman signed for FC Den Bosch on a three-year contract.

On 25 January 2022 he signed with Lithuanian FK Kauno Žalgiris.

== International career ==
Born in the Netherlands, Trotman was called up to the Barbados national football team for the first time in March 2021, being eligible to represent Barbados through his father. He made his debut on 25 March 2021 in a 1–0 World Cup qualification defeat against Panama.

== Career statistics ==
=== Club ===
As of match played 5 October 2023

Appearances and goals by club, season and competition
Club	Season	League			Cup		Other		Total	
Club	Season	Division	Apps	Goals	Apps	Goals	Apps	Goals	Apps	Goals
Jong FC Twente	2017–18	Derde Divisie Saturday	7	2	—		0	0	7	2
FC Twente	2017–18	Eredivisie	1	0	0	0	0	0	1	0
FC Den Bosch	2019–20	Eerste Divisie	10	1	0	0	0	0	10	1
FC Den Bosch	2020–21	Eerste Divisie	19	4	0	0	0	0	19	4
FC Den Bosch	2021–22	Eerste Divisie	0	0	0	0	0	0	0	0
FC Den Bosch	Total		29	5	0	0	0	0	28	5
FK Kauno Žalgiris	2022	A Lyga	12	0	0	0	0	0	12	0
FK Kauno Žalgiris	2023	A Lyga	0	0	1	1	2	0	3	1
FK Kauno Žalgiris	Total		12	0	1	1	2	0	15	1
Glacis United	2023–24	Gibraltar Football League	2	2	0	0	0	0	2	2
Career total			51	9	1	1	2	0	54	10

=== International ===
As of match played 16 October 2023

Appearances and goals by national team and year
National team	Year	Apps	Goals
Barbados	2021	3	0
Barbados	2023	4	0
Total		7	0
