= Emil Bijlsma =

Dutch professional footballer

Personal information
- Date of birth: 6 September 1998 (age 28)
- Place of birth: Borger, Netherlands
- Height: 1.86 m (6 ft 1 in)
- Position: Midfielder

Team information
- Current team: Hoogeveen
- Number: 10

Youth career
- Borger
- Heerenveen
- Emmen

Senior career*
Years	Team	Apps	(Gls)
2017–2019	Emmen	2	(0)
2019–	Hoogeveen	28	(5)
- * Club domestic league appearances and goals as of 03:37, 9 Januari 2026 (UTC)

Emil Bijlsma (born 6 September 1998) is a Dutch footballer who plays as a midfielder for Hoogeveen.

== Career ==
Born in Borger, Bijlsma played youth football at local side Borger as well as for Heerenveen and Emmen.

After playing professionally for FC Emmen, he signed for VV Hoogeveen in August 2019.
