= László Vizler =

Hungarian footballer

Personal information
- Full name: László Tamás Vizler
- Date of birth: 13 October 2002 (age 24)
- Place of birth: Győr, Hungary
- Height: 1.75 m (5 ft 9 in)
- Position: Left winger

Team information
- Current team: Puskás Akadémia II

Youth career
- 2009–2013: Gyirmót
- 2013–2019: Puskás Akadémia

Senior career*
Years	Team	Apps	(Gls)
2019–2022	Puskás Akadémia	2	(0)
2019–	→ Puskás Akadémia II	42	(12)
2021–2022	→ Ajka (loan)	11	(1)
- * Club domestic league appearances and goals as of 12 March 2023

László Vizler (born 13 October 2002) is a Hungarian football midfielder who plays for Puskás Akadémia II.

== Career statistics ==
As of 9 May 2021.

Appearances and goals by club, season and competition
Club	Season	League			Cup		Continental		Other		Total	
Club	Season	Division	Apps	Goals	Apps	Goals	Apps	Goals	Apps	Goals	Apps	Goals
Puskás Akadémia II	2019–20	Nemzeti Bajnokság III	2	0	—		—		—		2	0
Puskás Akadémia II	2019–20	Nemzeti Bajnokság III	29	8	—		—		—		29	8
Puskás Akadémia II	Total		31	8	0	0	0	0	0	0	31	8
Puskás Akadémia	2020–21	Nemzeti Bajnokság I	2	0	0	0	0	0	—		2	0
Puskás Akadémia	Total		2	0	0	0	0	0	0	0	2	0
Career total			33	8	0	0	0	0	0	0	33	8
