= Gábor Sipos =

Hungarian footballer

Personal information
- Date of birth: 1 November 2002 (age 24)
- Place of birth: Hódmezővásárhely, Hungary
- Height: 1.82 m (6 ft 0 in)
- Position: Central midfielder

Team information
- Current team: Bicske

Youth career
- 2008–2013: Hódmezővásárhely
- 2013–2019: Puskás Akadémia

Senior career*
Years	Team	Apps	(Gls)
2019–2021	Puskás Akadémia	1	(0)
2019–2021	→ Puskás Akadémia II	39	(5)
2021–2023	Békéscsaba	33	(1)
2021–2023	Békéscsaba II	16	(1)
2023–	Bicske	5	(1)

International career^{‡}
2018	Hungary U-16	2	(0)
2019	Hungary U-17	1	(0)
- * Club domestic league appearances and goals as of 12 March 2023 ‡ National team caps and goals as of 10 February 2019

Gábor Sipos (born 1 November 2002) is a Hungarian football midfielder who plays for Nemzeti Bajnokság III club Bicske.

== Career statistics ==
As of 9 May 2021.

Appearances and goals by club, season and competition
Club	Season	League			Cup		Continental		Other		Total	
Club	Season	Division	Apps	Goals	Apps	Goals	Apps	Goals	Apps	Goals	Apps	Goals
Puskás Akadémia II	2019–20	Nemzeti Bajnokság III	11	1	—		—		—		11	1
Puskás Akadémia II	2019–20	Nemzeti Bajnokság III	28	4	—		—		—		28	4
Puskás Akadémia II	Total		39	5	0	0	0	0	0	0	39	5
Puskás Akadémia	2020–21	Nemzeti Bajnokság I	1	0	0	0	0	0	—		1	0
Puskás Akadémia	Total		1	0	0	0	0	0	0	0	1	0
Career total			40	5	0	0	0	0	0	0	40	5
