= Dylan George =

Dutch association football player

Personal information
- Full name: Dylan Osazee George
- Date of birth: 27 June 1998 (age 28)
- Place of birth: Beverwijk, Netherlands
- Height: 1.83 m (6 ft 0 in)
- Position: Winger

Team information
- Current team: ADO '20
- Number: 30

Youth career
- 2008–2011: RKVV DEM
- 2012–2016: Twente

Senior career*
Years	Team	Apps	(Gls)
2016–2018	Twente	41	(16)
2017–2019	Twente	19	(2)
2019	→ Helmond Sport (loan)	9	(1)
2020	HHC	4	(0)
2021	Spartak Varna II	2	(1)
2021	Spartak Varna	0	(0)
2022–2023	Eendracht Aalst	21	(1)
2023–	ADO '20	60	(6)
- * Club domestic league appearances and goals as of 12:05, 14 January 2026 (UTC)

Dylan George (born 27 June 1998) is a Dutch footballer who plays as a winger for Derde Divisie club ADO '20.

== Club career ==
George is a youth exponent from FC Twente. He made his Eredivisie debut at 4 March 2017 against Willem II in a 2–1 home win.

In 2021 he moved to Bulgaria where he took part in a trial with Levski Sofia, but later signed with the Second League team Spartak Varna. Since returning from injury, he made his debut for Spartak II on 24 October 2021 in the Third league match against Svetkavitsa Targovishte scoring a goal. In January 2022 he was released from the club.

George joined ADO '20 in September 2023 after leaving Belgian side Eendracht Aalst.

== Career statistics ==
Club performance		League		Cup		Total	
Club	Season	Apps	Goals	Apps	Goals	Apps	Goals
Netherlands		Tweede Divisie		KNVB Cup		Total	
Jong FC Twente	2016–17	27	7	–	–	27	7
Jong FC Twente	Total	27	7	–	–	27	7
Club	Season	Apps	Goals	Apps	Goals	Apps	Goals
Netherlands		Eredivisie		KNVB Cup		Total	
FC Twente	2016–17	8	1	–	–	8	1
FC Twente	Total	8	1	–	–	8	1
Career total		35	8	–	–	35	8

Statistics accurate as of last match played on 14 May 2017
