= Zeki Erkilinc =

Dutch footballer (born 1998)

Personal information
- Full name: Zeki Erkılınç
- Date of birth: 22 January 1998 (age 28)
- Place of birth: Hengelo, Netherlands
- Height: 1.75 m (5 ft 9 in)
- Position: Winger

Team information
- Current team: HSC '21
- Number: 22

Youth career
- 2014–2018: Twente
- 2017–2018: → Heracles Almelo (loan)

Senior career*
Years	Team	Apps	(Gls)
2018–2019	Heracles Almelo	1	(0)
2019–2020	Dordrecht	5	(0)
2020	VfB Lübeck	0	(0)
2020–2021	FC Gießen	26	(2)
2022–	HSC '21	68	(13)
- * Club domestic league appearances and goals as of 09:55, 20 July 2025 (UTC)

Zeki Erkilinc (born 22 January 1998) is a Dutch professional footballer who plays as a winger for Vierde Divisie club HSC '21.

== Club career ==
A youth product of FC Twente, Erkilinc joined Heracles Almelo on loan on 17 August 2017. On 11 May 2018, Erkilinc signed his first professional contract with Heracles Almelo. He made his professional debut with Heracles in a 4–2 Eredivisie win over FC Groningen on 21 October 2018.

On 21 March 2022, Erkilinc signed with Derde Divisie club HSC '21.

== Personal life ==
Born in the Netherlands, Erkilinc is of Turkish descent.
