= Stefan Thesker =

German footballer (born 1991)

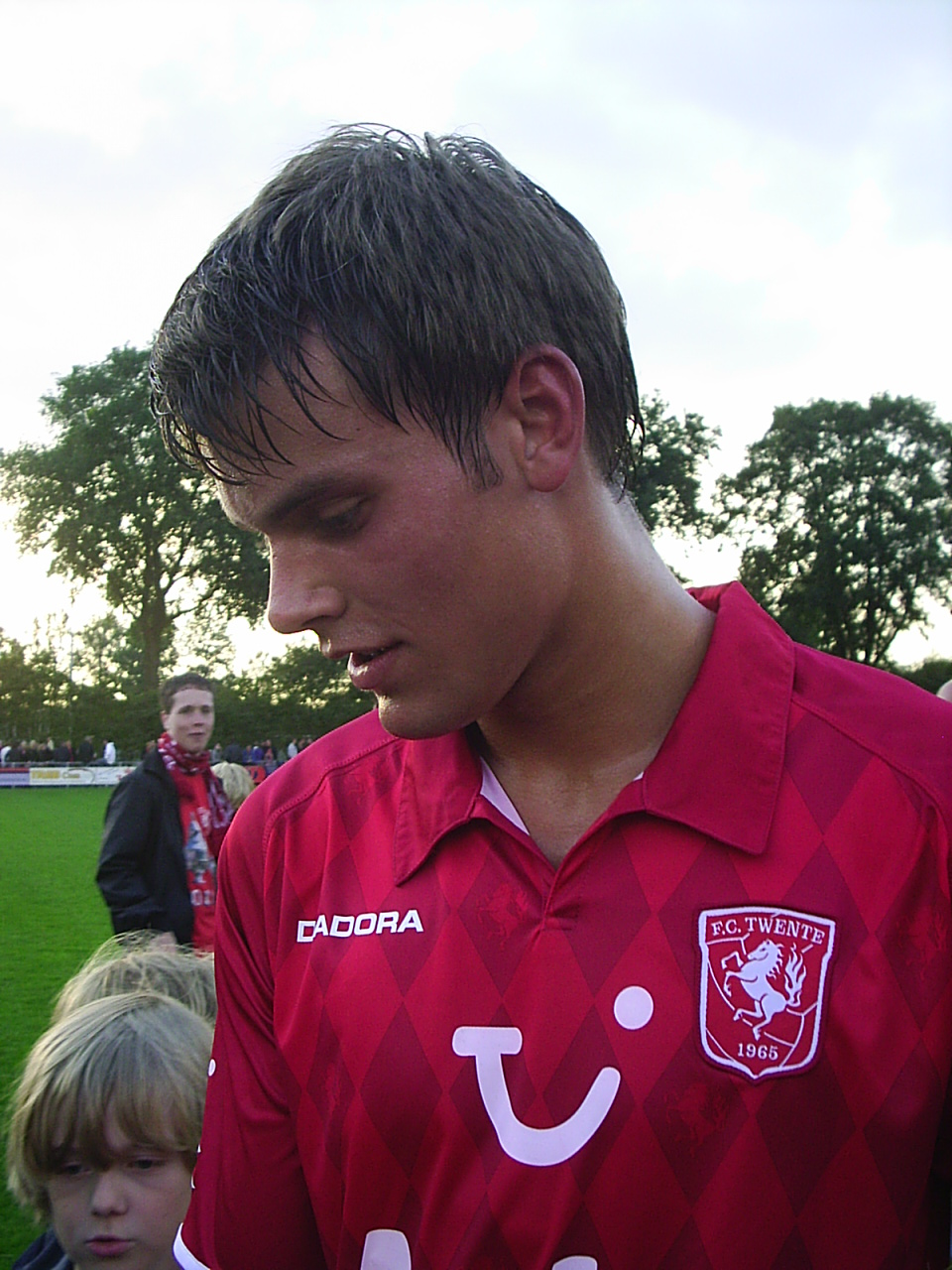
- Thesker with Twente in 2011

Personal information
- Date of birth: 11 April 1991 (age 35)
- Place of birth: Ahaus, Germany
- Height: 1.90 m (6 ft 3 in)
- Position: Centre back

Team information
- Current team: SKN St. Pölten
- Number: 2

Youth career
- 1995–2002: TuS Wüllen
- 2002–2005: Schalke 04
- 2005–2010: Twente

Senior career*
Years	Team	Apps	(Gls)
2010–2012	Twente	0	(0)
2011	→ Fortuna Sittard (loan)	15	(0)
2012–2014	1899 Hoffenheim II	29	(1)
2012–2014	1899 Hoffenheim	6	(0)
2014–2015	Hannover 96	2	(0)
2015–2016	Greuther Fürth	20	(0)
2016	Greuther Fürth II	0	(0)
2016	→ Twente (loan)	8	(2)
2016–2018	Twente	29	(0)
2018–2023	Holstein Kiel	88	(4)
2018–2022	Holstein Kiel II	4	(0)
2023–	SKN St. Pölten	62	(3)

International career^{‡}
2012–2013	Germany U21	7	(0)
- * Club domestic league appearances and goals as of 17 May 2026 ‡ National team caps and goals as of 12:25, 14 June 2013 (UTC)

Stefan Thesker (born 11 April 1991) is a German professional footballer who plays as a centre back for Austrian club SKN St. Pölten.

== Club career ==
=== Twente ===
Born in Ahaus, Germany, Thesker played for TuS Wüllen and Schalke 04 youth teams before moving to the Netherlands, joining Twente in 2005 and subsequently signed his first professional contract four years later.

After featured for the Jong FC Twente, Thesker was loaned out to Fortuna Sittard for the rest of the season in the January transfer window. He made his Fortuna Sittard debut for the club on 21 January 2011, coming on as a second-half substitute, in a 3–0 loss against Dordrecht. He went on to make 15 appearances for Fortuna Sittard and at the end of the 2010–11 season, he returned to his parent club.

=== 1899 Hoffenheim ===
After seven years abroad, Thesker returned to Germany, where he signed for Bundesliga side 1899 Hoffenheim on 2 January 2012. Upon signing for the club, the club's managing director Ernst Tanner commented on his move, quoting: "Stefan is a development-oriented German junior player from one of the best schools in Holland who will continue his training with us. I am convinced of its qualities and wish him all the best for the start with us."

Shortly after signing for the club, Thesker was sent to the 1899 Hoffenheim II squad for the next two seasons. In the 2012–13 season, he was included on the substitute bench on three occasions. However, he suffered an Achilles irritation on his foot and was sidelined for several months. After returning from injury, he finally made his TSG 1899 Hoffenehim debut on 9 March 2013 against Greuther Fürth, coming on as a second-half substitute, in a 1–0 win. Towards the end of the 2012–13 season, he appeared in the first team regularly, due to absent of Matthieu Delpierre and Patrick Ochs.

At the start of the 2013–14 season, Thesker made two appearances for the side, which were against Nürnberg and Schalke 04. However, he found his first opportunities limited at the club, due to being on the substitute bench before being sidelined with torn ligament injuries. Even after returning, he returned to the reserve side for the rest of the season and by the end of March, he never played for either side again, leading a high chance of leaving the club when his contract expires at the end of the 2013–14 season.

On 30 April 2014, it was announced Thesker had signed a pre-contract agreement with Hannover 96 and would join them on 1 July 2014 on a free transfer after rejecting a new contract at 1899 Hoffenheim.

=== Hannover 96 ===
After joining Hannover 96, Thesker was given a number seventeen shirt ahead of the new season. However, in the club's pre-season tour, he suffered a thigh injury but soon managed to recover just in time for the start of the season.

However, Thesker's first team opportunities at Hannover 96 became more limited and was subsequently played in the reserve until he was called up for the first team in late-October. On 1 November 2014, he made his Hannover 96 debut coming on as a second-half substitute, in a 1–0 win over Eintracht Frankfurt. He also made another appearance on 7 November 2014, starting the whole game, in a 2–0 win over Hertha BSC. With two appearances for the club, Thesker was expecting to leave the club in the January transfer window. Despite this, he reflected his time there, stating: "It was a good time, which has brought me forward in my development, even though I have not played much"

=== Greuther Fürth ===
On 5 January 2015, Thesker joined Greuther Fürth, signing a two-year contract, keeping him until 2017.

Thesker made his Greuther Fürth debut on 6 February 2015, starting the whole game, in a 1–0 loss against Ingolstadt 04. This is followed up by setting up a goal, which turned out to be the only goal in the game, in a 1–0 win over St. Pauli on 16 February 2015. Since then, he became a first team regular for the side throughout the 2014–15 season, making eleven appearances.

However, ahead of the 2015–16 season, Thesker found himself out of the first team and was placed on the substitute bench after Benedikt Röcker was preferred instead. In a 3–2 loss against St. Pauli on 16 August 2015, he set up one of the goals in his first appearance of the season. He managed to regain his first team place soon after in late-October. In the first half of the season, he made nine appearances.

=== Twente (second spell) ===
On 28 January 2016, Thesker returned to Twente on loan until the end of the season.

Three days after signing for the club, on 31 January 2016, he made his Twente debut, playing 60 minutes, in a 3–1 win over Utrecht. After being sidelined for two months, due to his diagnosis with cancer, he made his return for the reserve side, in a 0–0 draw against Brabant United U21 on 15 March 2016. Five days after returning to playing, Thesker scored his first two goals in a 2–2 draw against AZ Alkmaar, having come on as a second-half substitute. He finished the 2015–16 season with eight appearances and two goals.

On 17 August 2016, Thesker signed a three-year contract with the club on a permanent basis. He went on to be captain for the side, having been appointed as a captain from the start of the season, succeeding Felipe Gutiérrez. His first game after signing for the club on a permanent basis came in the opening game of the season, where he set up the only goal for the club, in a 2–1 loss against Excelsior. Since making his debut for the club, he continued to be a first team regular. Although he was sidelined on three occasions, Thesker finished his first season making 30 appearances in all competitions and helping the club finish in 7th place in the league.

=== Holstein Kiel ===
In June 2018, Thesker joined 2. Bundesliga side Holstein Kiel on a three-year contract until 2021.

=== SKN St. Pölten ===
On 11 July 2023, Thesker signed a three-year contract with SKN St. Pölten in Austria.

== International career ==
On 9 August 2012, Thesker was called up by Germany U21, along with teammates, Sebastian Rudy and Kevin Volland. Thesker did impressively well on his Germany U21 debut when he set up two goals, in a 6–1 win over Argentina U20.

Thesker was then called up by Germany U21 again for the UEFA European Under-21 Championship. At the tournament, he started all three matches that Germany U21 eliminated from the group stage. He went on to make seven appearances for the Germany U21.

== Personal life ==
In December 2015, Thesker found himself in a controversy when he was captured on video by Nuremberg fan, scolding a bouncer several times and mocking his salary. This caused an embarrassment for the club, who apologised on his behalf. As a result, Thesker, himself, apologised for his actions and begged for forgiveness, as well as, being faced with a fine. Not only that, Thesker was also demoted to the reserve side.

In February 2016, Thesker announced that he had been diagnosed with testicular cancer and had to have a tumor removed at the surgery. It came after he was notified of the diagnosis one day before his debut against Utrecht on 29 January 2016. Thesker also reflected on his time at the hospital and received support from teammates and family.

In January 2017, Thesker overcame his cancer, making a full recovery and hoping he could return to football.

On 14 March 2020, Thesker tested positive for COVID-19.
