= Alexander Laukart =

German footballer

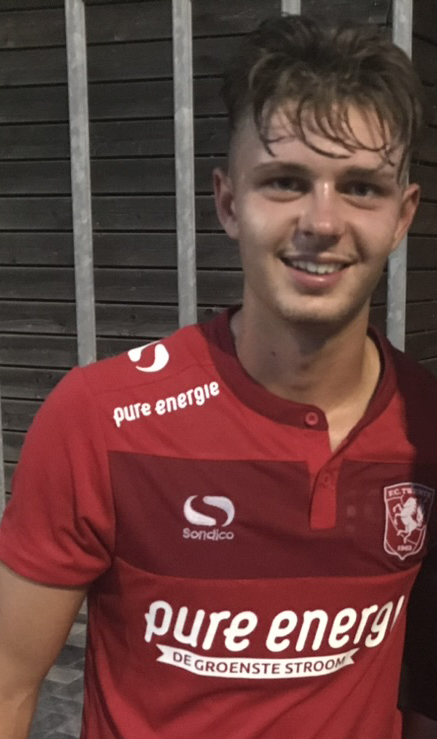

Personal information
- Date of birth: 25 October 1998 (age 28)
- Place of birth: Hamburg, Germany
- Height: 1.83 m (6 ft 0 in)
- Position: Attacking midfielder

Team information
- Current team: Weiche Flensburg
- Number: 7

Youth career
- Hamburger SV
- –2012: FC St. Pauli
- 2012–2013: VfL Wolfsburg
- 2013–2014: FC St. Pauli
- 2014–2017: Borussia Dortmund

Senior career*
Years	Team	Apps	(Gls)
2017–2019	Twente	11	(0)
2017–2018	Jong FC Twente	7	(0)
2019–2020	Den Bosch	16	(6)
2020–2021	Türkgücü München	8	(0)
2021–2024	Union Titus Pétange	36	(3)
2024–	Weiche Flensburg	18	(1)
- * Club domestic league appearances and goals as of 22 September 2026

Alexander Laukart (born 25 October 1998) is a German professional footballer who plays as a midfielder for Weiche Flensburg.

== Club career ==
Laukart made his Eredivisie debut for FC Twente on 13 August 2017 in a game against Feyenoord.
