= Nick Hengelman =

Dutch footballer (born 1989)

Personal information
- Date of birth: 15 November 1989 (age 36)
- Place of birth: Glanerbrug, Netherlands
- Height: 1.86 m (6 ft 1 in)
- Position: Goalkeeper

Youth career
- VV Glanerbrug
- De Tubanters 1897

Senior career*
Years	Team	Apps	(Gls)
2012–2013	AGOVV	18	(0)
2013	Vitesse	0	(0)
2013–2014	Achilles '29	26	(0)
2014–2016	FC Oss	25	(0)
2016–2019	Twente	0	(0)
2016–2019	Jong FC Twente	15	(0)
2019–2020	Ajax Cape Town	30	(0)
2020–2021	Ajax	0	(0)
2021–2022	Pirin Blagoevgrad	7	(0)
2022	Go Ahead Eagles	0	(0)
- * Club domestic league appearances and goals as of 15 May 2022

Nick Hengelman (born 15 November 1989) is a Dutch professional footballer who plays as a goalkeeper.

== Career ==
Hengelman was born in Glanerbrug. He is a youth product from the FC Twente/Heracles Almelo football academy. He formerly played for AGOVV Apeldoorn. When the club was declared bankrupt in January 2013, he joined Vitesse to maintain his fitness. When the club did not offer him a new contract in the summer of 2013, Hengelman found a new club in Achilles '29. He made his début for the team in the first match in professional football for Achilles on 3 August 2013. The game in Emmen ended in 2–2. On 5 August 2014, Hengelman signed with FC Oss.

On 2 August 2019, Hengelman signed with South African club Ajax Cape Town. After a 4th place finish in the National First Division the previous season, Ajax Amsterdam parted ways with their sister club. Hengelman was then given a one-year contract as a fifth choice keeper under Erik ten Hag back in Amsterdam while training with Jong Ajax the reserves team of Ajax for which he is no longer eligible to play due to his age. In October 2021, Hengelman joined Bulgarian First League side Pirin Blagoevgrad.

On 31 January 2022 it was announced that Hengelman had signed with Dutch club Go Ahead Eagles form Deventer, returning to the Netherlands for the remainder of the 2021–22 season.
