= 2015–16 FC Twente season =

Twente
2015-16 season
- Chairman: No Chairman at the moment
- Manager: René Hake (caretaker)
- Eredivisie: 13th
- KNVB Cup: Second Round
- Top goalscorer: League: Hakim Ziyech (17); All: Hakim Ziyech (17)
Home colours	Away colours	Third colours

The 2015–16 season was FC Twente's 50th season in the Eredivisie.

== Squad ==
Squad No.	Name	Nationality	Position(s)	Date of Birth (Age)	Signed from
Goalkeepers
1	Nick Marsman	(Netherlands)	GK	1 October 1990 (age 36)	Youth Academy
16	Joël Drommel	(Netherlands)	GK	16 November 1996 (age 30)	Youth Academy
30	Timo Plattel	(Netherlands)	GK	12 March 1994 (age 32)	Youth Academy
20	Sonny Stevens	(Netherlands)	GK	22 June 1992 (age 34)	(Netherlands) Volendam
Defenders
2	Stefan Thesker	(Germany)	CB	11 April 1991 (age 35)	(Germany) Greuther Fürth
3	Bruno Uvini	(Brazil)	CB	3 June 1991 (age 35)	(Italy) Napoli
4	Giorgos Katsikas	(Greece)	CB	15 June 1990 (age 36)	(Greece) PAOK
5	Robbert Schilder	(Netherlands)	LB/DM	18 April 1986 (age 40)	(Netherlands) NAC Breda
15	Joachim Andersen	(Denmark)	CB	31 May 1996 (age 30)	Youth Academy
17	Hidde ter Avest	(Netherlands)	RB	20 May 1997 (age 29)	Youth Academy
25	Peet Bijen	(Netherlands)	CB	28 January 1995 (age 31)	Youth Academy
28	Jeroen van der Lely	(Netherlands)	RB	22 March 1996 (age 30)	Youth Academy
Midfielders
6	Felipe Gutiérrez (vc)	(Chile)	CM	8 October 1990 (age 36)	(Chile) Universidad Católica
7	Chinedu Ede	(Germany)	CM	5 February 1987 (age 39)	(Germany) Mainz 05
10	Hakim Ziyech (c)	(Morocco)	AM	19 March 1993 (age 33)	(Netherlands) Heerenveen
22	Kamohelo Mokotjo	(South Africa)	DM	11 March 1991 (age 35)	(Netherlands) PEC Zwolle
23	Jelle van der Heyden	(Netherlands)	DM	31 August 1995 (age 31)	Youth Academy
Forwards
8	Oskar Zawada	(Poland)	CF	1 February 1996 (age 30)	(Germany) VfL Wolfsburg
9	Torgeir Børven	(Norway)	CF	3 December 1991 (age 34)	(Norway) Vålerenga
11	Thomas Agyepong	(Ghana)	RW/LW	10 October 1995 (age 31)	(England) Manchester City
12	Tim Hölscher	(Germany)	RW/LW	21 May 1995 (age 31)	Youth Academy
18	Zakaria El Azzouzi	(Morocco)	CF	7 May 1996 (age 30)	(Netherlands) Ajax
24	Jari Oosterwijk	(Netherlands)	CF	3 March 1995 (age 31)	Youth Academy
26	Jerson Cabral	(Netherlands)	LW	1 January 1991 (age 35)	(Netherlands) Feyenoord
27	Alessio Da Cruz	(Netherlands)	RW/LW	18 January 1997 (age 29)	Youth Academy

Last updated: 2 April 2016

== Transfers ==
=== Summer ===
Players transferred in
Date	Pos.	Name	Club	Fee	Ref.
2 July 2015	DF	(Greece) Giorgos Katsikas	(Greece) PAOK	Free transfer	
28 August 2015	MF	(Germany) Chinedu Ede	(Germany) Mainz 05	Free transfer	
Players loaned in
Start date	Pos.	Name	Club	End date	Ref.
13 July 2015	DF	(Brazil) Bruno Uvini	(Italy) Napoli	End of season	
30 July 2015	FW	(Nigeria) Michael Olaitan	(Greece) Olympiacos	End of season	
30 July 2015	FW	(Ghana) Thomas Agyepong	(England) Manchester City	End of season	
Players transferred out
Date	Pos.	Name	Club	Fee	Ref.
15 May 2015	FW	(Denmark) Kasper Kusk	(Denmark) Copenhagen	Undisclosed	
25 June 2015	DF	(Netherlands) Darryl Lachman	(England) Sheffield Wednesday	Undisclosed	
30 June 2015	FW	(Netherlands) Luc Castaignos	(Germany) Eintracht Frankfurt	Undisclosed	
2 July 2015	DF	(Denmark) Andreas Bjelland	(England) Brentford	Undisclosed	
7 July 2015	DF	(Curaçao) Cuco Martina	(England) Southampton	Undisclosed	
30 July 2015	FW	(Netherlands) Bilal Ould-Chikh	(Portugal) Benfica	Undisclosed	
28 August 2015	FW	(Netherlands) Youness Mokhtar	(Saudi Arabia) Al-Nassr	Undisclosed	
31 August 2015	FW	(Mexico) Jesús Corona	(Portugal) Porto	Undisclosed	
Players loaned out
Start date	Pos.	Name	Club	End date	Ref.
3 August 2015	GK	(Portugal) Daniel Fernandes	(United States) San Antonio Scorpions	End of season	
20 August 2015	MF	(Netherlands) Kyle Ebecilio	(England) Nottingham Forest	End of season	
Players released
Date	Pos.	Name	Subsequent club	Join date	Ref.
30 June 2015	DF	(Netherlands) Dico Koppers	(Netherlands) Willem II	1 July 2015	
30 June 2015	FW	(Slovenia) Andrej Rendla	Currently unattached	1 July 2015	
30 June 2015	GK	(Poland) Filip Bednarek	(Netherlands) Utrecht	1 July 2015	
30 June 2015	DF	(Netherlands) Tim Breukers	(Netherlands) Heracles	1 July 2015	
30 June 2015	FW	(Japan) Ryo Miyaichi	(Germany) FC St. Pauli	1 July 2015	
30 June 2015	MF	(Netherlands) Orlando Engelaar	Currently unattached	1 July 2015	
30 June 2015	MF	(Netherlands) Chris David	(Netherlands) Go Ahead Eagles	1 July 2015	

=== Winter ===
Players loaned in
Start date	Pos.	Name	Club	End date	Ref.
21 January 2016	FW	(Netherlands) Zakaria El Azzouzi	(Netherlands) Ajax	End of season	
28 January 2016	DF	(Germany) Stefan Thesker	(Germany) Greuther Fürth	End of season	
1 February 2016	FW	(Poland) Oskar Zawada	(Germany) VfL Wolfsburg	End of season	
Players loaned out
Start date	Pos.	Name	Club	End date	Ref.
22 January 2016	MF	(Ghana) Shadrach Eghan	(Norway) Stabæk	End of season	
Players transferred out
Date	Pos.	Name	Club	Fee	Ref.
27 January 206	MF	(Peru) Renato Tapia	(Netherlands) Feyenoord	Undisclosed	
Players released
Date	Pos.	Name	Subsequent club	Join date	Ref.
14 January 2016	FW	(Nigeria) Michael Olaitan	(Greece) Olympiacos	21 January 2016	

== Non-competitive ==
=== Friendlies ===
8 July 2015 Friendly	Regioteam (Netherlands)	1–7	(Netherlands) FC Twente	Mariënberg
19:00	Heerkes 78'	Report	Mokhtar 7'; Ziyech 29' (pen.); Eghan 33'; Hölscher 38'; Oosterwijk 65', 70'; Da Cruz 83'	Stadium: Sportpark Het Westerpark; Attendance: 450; Referee: Roelof Luinge

11 July 2015 Friendly	Team Twenterand (Netherlands)	0–16	(Netherlands) FC Twente	Vriezenveen
14:30		Report	Ziyech 1', 5', 9', 24', 45'; Ter Avest 4'; Eghan 11', 15', 21', 43'; Hölscher 39'; Cabral 50', 66'; Ntuli 74'; Bleker 76'; Zschusschen 87'	Stadium: Sportpark Het Midden; Attendance: 2,000; Referee: Raymond Meilink

15 July 2015 Friendly	SDV Barneveld (Netherlands)	0–4	(Netherlands) FC Twente	Barneveld
19:30		Report	Ebecilio 54'; Eghan 72', 89'; Van der Heyden 77'	Stadium: Sportpark Norschoten; Attendance: 1,500; Referee: Ruud Bossen

18 July 2015 Friendly	Achilles '29 (Netherlands)	0–3	(Netherlands) FC Twente	Groesbeek
15:00		Report	Ziyech 43', 57'; Da Cruz 69'	Stadium: Sportpark De Heikant

22 July 2015 Friendly	FC Twente (Netherlands)	2–0	(Turkey) Sivasspor	Vriezenveen
19:00	Ziyech 42' (pen.); Mokhtar 78'	Report		Stadium: Sportpark Het Midden; Referee: Jochem Kamphuis

25 July 2015 Friendly	FC Twente (Netherlands)	0–5	(Turkey) Gençlerbirliği	Oldenzaal
16:00		Report	Kahveci 10'; Skúlason 13'; El Kabir 31'; Stancu 38', 44'	Stadium: Sportpark Vondersweijde; Attendance: 700

29 July 2015 Friendly	FC Twente (Netherlands)	1–2	(Greece) Olympiacos	Veenoord
19:00	Ziyech 77'	Report	Fortounis 29'; Pardo 45'	Stadium: Sportpark S.V. Twedo; Referee: Ed Janssen

2 August 2015 Friendly	Schalke 04 (Germany)	1–1	(Netherlands) FC Twente	Gelsenkirchen
17:30	Geis 28'	Report	Olaitan 85'	Stadium: Veltins-Arena; Attendance: 33,000

7 January 2016 Friendly	FC Twente (Netherlands)	2–3	(Belgium) Genk	San Pedro del Pinatar
17:30	Ziyech 40'; Soumaoro 70'; Hölscher 90'	Report	Ünal 80'; Gorius 105'

Last updated: 27 January 2016

== Competitions ==
=== Eredivisie ===
==== League table ====
Pos	Team	Pld	W	D	L	GF	GA	GD	Pts
11	ADO Den Haag	34	10	13	11	48	49	−1	43
12	Heerenveen	34	11	9	14	46	61	−15	42
13	Twente (Note: Twente were deducted three points for breaking the financial standards set by the Royal Dutch Football Association. In May 2016 Twente had their licence for the Eredivisie revoked by KNVB and was relegated to the Eerste Divisie, but they successfully appealed this decision and stayed in the league.)	34	12	7	15	49	64	−15	40
14	Roda JC Kerkrade	34	8	10	16	34	55	−21	34
15	Excelsior	34	7	9	18	34	60	−26	30

Source: Eredivisie, NUsport, Soccerway
Rules for classification: 1) Points; 2) Goal difference; 3) Goals scored; 4) Head-to-head points; 5) Head-to-head goal difference; 6) Head-to-head away goals scored; 7) Play-off (only if deciding champion, European competitions, or relegation); 8) Draw.

==== League matches ====
12 August 2015 1 (Note: Groningen - FC Twente was rescheduled from 9 August to 12 August due to a police strike.)	FC Groningen	1–1	FC Twente	Groningen
18:30 GMT	De Leeuw 84'	Report	Tapia 42'	Stadium: Euroborg; Attendance: 21,241; Referee: Janssen

15 August 2015 2	FC Twente	1–4	ADO	Enschede
19:45 GMT	Ziyech 59'	Report	Havenaar 12'; Schaken 27'; Wormgoor 72'; Duplan 79'	Stadium: De Grolsch Veste; Attendance: 24,900; Referee: Gözöbüyük

23 August 2015 3	PEC	2–1	FC Twente	Zwolle
12:30 GMT	Veldwijk 25' (pen.); Rienstra 63'	Report	Ziyech 46'	Stadium: IJsseldelta Stadion; Attendance: 12,123; Referee: Blom

29 August 2015 4	Heracles	2–0	FC Twente	Almelo
20:45 GMT	Bel Hassani 17'; Weghorst 75'	Report		Stadium: Polman Stadion; Referee: Higler

12 September 2015 5	FC Twente	2–2	Ajax	Enschede
19:45 GMT	Gutiérrez 20'; Ziyech 51' (pen.)	Report	Fischer 65'; Gudelj 82' (pen.)	Stadium: De Grolsch Veste; Attendance: 29,000; Referee: van Boekel

19 September 2015 6	SC Cambuur	0–0	FC Twente	Leeuwarden
18:30 GMT		Report		Stadium: Cambuur Stadion; Attendance: 9,714; Referee: Kamphuis

27 September 2015 7	FC Twente	2–1	Roda JC	Enschede
16:45 GMT	Oosterwijk 25'; Mokotjo 29'	Report	Juric 81'	Stadium: De Grolsch Veste; Attendance: 24,700; Referee: Gözübüyük

4 October 2015 8	AZ	3–1	FC Twente	Alkmaar
16:45 GMT	Janssen 64'; Janssen 73'; Hupperts 79'	Report	Ziyech 83'	Stadium: AFAS Stadion; Attendance: 13,711; Referee: Janssen

18 October 2015 9	FC Twente	1–0	N.E.C.	Enschede
12:30 GMT	Bijen 67'	Report		Stadium: De Grolsch Veste; Attendance: 24,500; Referee: Manschot

24 October 2015 10	FC Twente	1–3	PSV	Enschede
19:45 GMT	Ziyech 58'	Report	De Jong 53'; Locadia 85'; Pereiro 87'	Stadium: De Grolsch Veste; Attendance: 25,500; Referee: Blom

1 November 2015 11	FC Utrecht	4–2	FC Twente	Utrecht
14:30 GMT	Letschert 29'; Drommel 38' (o.g.); Barazite 64'; Haller 89' (pen.)	Report	Agyepong 18'; Ziyech 40'	Stadium: Stadion Galgenwaard; Attendance: 17,034; Referee: Higler

7 November 2015 12	FC Twente	1–4	SC Heerenveen	Enschede
18:30 GMT	Ziyech 64'	Report	Slagveer 6'; Otigba 40'; Andersen 78' (o.g.); Larsson 85'	Stadium: De Grolsch Veste; Attendance: 26,000; Referee: Kamphuis

22 November 2015 13	Feyenoord	5–0	FC Twente	Rotterdam
14:30 GMT	Gustafson 7', 26'; Kramer 46'; Ahmadi 50'; Başaçıkoğlu 92'	Report		Stadium: De Kuip; Referee: Liesveld

28 November 2015 14	FC Twente	1–3	Willem II	Enschede
20:45 GMT	Oosterwijk 37'	Report	Andersen 15', 22', 47'	Stadium: De Grolsch Veste; Attendance: 24,100; Referee: Manschot

5 December 2015 15	Excelsior	1–1	FC Twente	Rotterdam
18:30 GMT	Van Weert 38'	Report	Ziyech 75'	Stadium: Stadion Woudestein; Referee: van den Kerkhof

12 December 2015 16	FC Twente	2–1	De Graafschap	Enschede
20:45 GMT	Andersen 34'; Ziyech 90'	Report	Driver 32'	Stadium: De Grolsch Veste; Attendance: 25,100; Referee: Janssen

18 December 2015 17	Vitesse	5–1	FC Twente	Arnhem
20:00 GMT	Qazaishvili 10'; Rashica 18', 58'; Solanke 55'; Bijen 82' (o.g.)	Report	Ziyech 44'	Stadium: Gelredome; Attendance: 15,987; Referee: Gözübüyük

15 January 2016 18	FC Twente	4–0	Heracles	Enschede
20:00 GMT	Ede 16', 60'; Ziyech 30'; Ter Avest 62'	Report		Stadium: De Grolsch Veste; Attendance: 28,900; Referee: Blom

24 January 2016 19	PSV	4–2	FC Twente	Eindhoven
14:30 GMT	Moreno 21', 23'; Narsingh 37'; Jozefzoon 80'	Report	Oosterwijk 8'; Ede 69'	Stadium: Philips Stadion; Attendance: 33,000; Referee: van Boekel

27 January 2016 20	N.E.C.	2–0	FC Twente	Nijmegen
18:30 GMT	Limbombe 75'; Santos 88'	Report		Stadium: Goffertstadion; Attendance: 10,958; Referee: van de Graaf

31 January 2016 21	FC Twente	3–1	FC Utrecht	Enschede
16:45 GMT	Uvini 4'; El Azzouzi 8'; Gutiérrez 35'	Report	Boymans 86'	Stadium: De Grolsch Veste; Attendance: 24.400; Referee: Mulder

6 February 2016 22	SC Heerenveen	1–3	FC Twente	Heerenveen
19:45 GMT	Veerman 13'	Report	Uvini 40'; Cabral 89'; Ziyech 93'	Stadium: Abe Lenstra Stadion; Attendance: 23,125; Referee: Higler

13 February 2016 23	Roda JC	0–1	FC Twente	Kerkrade
19:45 GMT		Report	Ede 62'	Stadium: Parkstad Limburg Stadion; Attendance: 15,012; Referee: Kamphuis

20 February 2016 24	FC Twente	3–0	SC Cambuur	Enschede
20:45 GMT	Peersman 27' (o.g.); Cabral 31'; Ziyech 90' (pen.)	Report		Stadium: De Grolsch Veste; Attendance: 25,200; Referee: Lindhout

27 February 2016 25	FC Twente	2–0	FC Groningen	Enschede
18:30 GMT	El Azzouzi 16'; Cabral 81'	Report		Stadium: De Grolsch Veste; Attendance: 25,200; Referee: van den Kerkhof

4 March 2016 26	ADO	2–1	FC Twente	The Hague
20.00 GMT	Kristensens 2'; Derijck 52' (pen.)	Report	Ziyech 80'	Stadium: Kyocera Stadion; Attendance: 13,128; Referee: Blom

12 March 2016 27	FC Twente	2–1	PEC	Enschede
18.30 GMT	Ziyech 46'; Cabral 55'	Report	Ehizibue 28'	Stadium: De Grolsch Veste; Attendance: 27,200; Referee: Makkelie

20 March 2016 28	FC Twente	2–2	AZ	Enschede
12.30 GMT	Thesker 75'; Thesker 90+2'	Report	Janssen 51'; Haye 77'	Stadium: De Grolsch Veste; Attendance: 25,800; Referee: van Boekel

2 April 2016 29	Willem II	2–3	FC Twente	Tilburg
20:45 GMT	Falkenburg 1'; Andersen 42'	Report	Ziyech 57', 79'; Ede 73'	Stadium: Koning Willem II Stadion; Attendance: 13,110; Referee: Higler

10 April 2016 30	FC Twente	0–1	Feyenoord	Enschede
16:45 GMT		Report	Kramer 13'	Stadium: De Grolsch Veste; Attendance: 27,600; Referee: Gözübüyük

15 April 2016 31	De Graafschap	1–1	FC Twente	Doetinchem
20:00 GMT	Parzyszek 86'	Report	Cabral 31'	Stadium: De Vijverberg; Attendance: 12,600; Referee: Lindhout

20 April 2016 32	FC Twente	2–0	Excelsior	Enschede
20:45 GMT	Cabral 85'; El Azzouzi 90'	Report		Stadium: De Grolsch Veste; Attendance: 24,500; Referee: Janssen

1 May 2016 33	Ajax	4–0	FC Twente	Amsterdam
14:30 GMT	Černý 37'; Van der Hoorn 80'; Fischer 82'; Younes 86'	Report		Stadium: Amsterdam Arena; Attendance: 51,727; Referee: Blom

8 May 2016 34	FC Twente	2–2	Vitesse	Enschede
14:30 GMT	El Azzouzi 27'; Ede 67'	Report	Uvini 3' (o.g.); Zhang 62'	Stadium: De Grolsch Veste; Attendance: 26,500; Referee: Wiedemeijer

Last updated: 8 May 2016

=== KNVB Cup ===
23 September Second round	FC Groningen	2–1	FC Twente	Groningen
18:30	Linssen 53'; Maduro 61'	Report	Ter Avest 21'	Stadium: Euroborg; Attendance: 13,500; Referee: Blom

Last updated: 24 September 2015

== Statistics ==
=== Appearances and goals ===
As of 8 May 2016

No.	Pos	Nat	Player	Total		Eredivisie		KNVB Cup	
No.	Pos	Nat	Player	Apps	Goals	Apps	Goals	Apps	Goals
1	GK	(Netherlands) NED	Nick Marsman	22	0	22	0	0	0
2	DF	(Germany) GER	Stefan Thesker	8	2	8	2	0	0
3	DF	(Brazil) BRA	Bruno Uvini	34	3	33	3	1	0
4	DF	(Greece) GRE	Giorgos Katsikas	3	0	3	0	0	0
5	DF	(Netherlands) NED	Robbert Schilder	23	0	23	0	0	0
6	MF	(Chile) CHI	Felipe Gutiérrez	30	2	29	2	1	0
7	MF	(Germany) GER	Chinedu Ede	28	6	27	6	1	0
8	FW	(Poland) POL	Oskar Zawada	11	0	11	0	0	0
9	FW	(Norway) NOR	Torgeir Børven	4	0	4	0	0	0
10	MF	(Netherlands) NED	Hakim Ziyech	33	17	32	17	1	0
11	FW	(Ghana) GHA	Thomas Agyepong	14	1	14	1	0	0
12	FW	(Germany) GER	Tim Hölscher	18	0	18	0	0	0
13	GK	(Netherlands) NED	Joël Drommel	12	0	11	0	1	0
15	DF	(Denmark) DEN	Joachim Andersen	18	1	18	1	0	0
16	GK	(Netherlands) NED	Timo Plattel	0	0	0	0	0	0
17	DF	(Netherlands) NED	Hidde ter Avest	30	2	29	1	1	1
18	FW	(Netherlands) NED	Zakaria El Azzouzi	13	4	13	4	0	0
20	GK	(Netherlands) NED	Sonny Stevens	0	0	0	0	0	0
22	MF	(South Africa) RSA	Kamohelo Mokotjo	31	1	30	1	1	0
23	MF	(Netherlands) NED	Jelle van der Heyden	14	0	13	0	1	0
24	MF	(Netherlands) NED	Jari Oosterwijk	14	2	13	2	1	0
25	DF	(Netherlands) NED	Peet Bijen	18	1	17	1	1	0
26	DF	(Netherlands) NED	Jerson Cabral	25	6	24	6	1	0
27	DF	(Netherlands) NED	Alessio Da Cruz	4	0	3	0	1	0
28	DF	(Netherlands) NED	Jeroen van der Lely	21	0	20	0	1	0
33	FW	(Netherlands) NED	Vincent Schmidt	1	0	1	0	0	0
Players who left the club during the 2015–16 season
11	FW	(Mexico) MEX	Jesús Corona	4	0	4	0	0	0
14	MF	(Peru) PER	Renato Tapia	14	1	14	1	0	0
19	MF	(Ghana) GHA	Shadrach Eghan	4	0	4	0	0	0
99	FW	(Nigeria) NGR	Michael Olaitan	16	0	15	0	1	0

=== Goalscorers ===
As of 8 May 2016

Rank	Player	Position	Eredivisie	KNVB Cup	Total
1	(Netherlands) Hakim Ziyech	AM	17	0	17
2	(Netherlands) Jerson Cabral	FW	6	0	6
3	(Germany) Chinedu Ede	CM	6	0	6
4	(Netherlands) Zakaria El Azzouzi	FW	4	0	4
5	(Netherlands) Jari Oosterwijk	FW	3	0	3
6	(Chile) Felipe Gutiérrez	CM	2	0	2
7	(Brazil) Bruno Uvini	DF	2	0	2
8	(Germany) Stefan Thesker	DF	2	0	2
9	(Netherlands) Hidde ter Avest	DF	1	1	2
10	(Peru) Renato Tapia	CM	1	0	1
11	(South Africa) Kamohelo Mokotjo	CM	1	0	1
12	(Netherlands) Peet Bijen	DF	1	0	1
13	(Ghana) Thomas Agyepong	FW	1	0	1
14	(Denmark) Joachim Andersen (footballer)	DF	1	0	1
Own goals			2	0	2
Total			50	1	51
