= Bleker =

Bleker is a surname. Notable people with the surname include:

- Gerrit Claesz Bleker (1592–1656), Dutch painter
- Dirck Bleker (1621–1702), Dutch painter, son of Gerrit
- Henk Bleker (born 1953), Dutch politician and jurist
- Lars Bleker (born 1994), German footballer
