= Thomas Agyepong =

Ghanaian footballer

Personal information
- Full name: Thomas Agyepong
- Date of birth: 10 October 1996 (age 30)
- Place of birth: Accra, Ghana
- Height: 1.68 m (5 ft 6 in)
- Position: Winger

Team information
- Current team: Muras United

Youth career
- Manchester City

Senior career*
Years	Team	Apps	(Gls)
2015–2022	Manchester City	0	(0)
2015–2016	→ Twente (loan)	14	(1)
2016–2018	→ NAC Breda (loan)	39	(2)
2018–2019	→ Hibernian (loan)	9	(1)
2019–2020	→ Waasland-Beveren (loan)	14	(0)
2020–2022	→ Lommel (loan)	13	(0)
2023–2024	Paide Linnameeskond	40	(1)
2026–	Muras United	0	(0)

International career^{‡}
2017–	Ghana	6	(0)
- * Club domestic league appearances and goals as of 9 April 2026 ‡ National team caps and goals as of 13:15, 15 July 2019 (UTC)

Thomas Agyepong (born 10 October 1996) is a Ghanaian professional footballer who plays as a winger for Muras United. He has also been a member of the Ghana national team.

== Club career ==
=== Manchester City ===
Agyepong joined Manchester City in 2015 from the Right to Dream Academy.

==== Loan to FC Twente ====
Agyepong was loaned to Dutch Eredivisie team FC Twente for the 2015–16 Eredivisie season. He made his debut on 4 October, appearing as a substitute in a 3–1 loss to AZ Alkmaar. His first start came on 24 October in a 3–1 loss to PSV Eindhoven playing 62 minutes. A shoulder injury suffered in March required surgery, which ended his season.

==== Loan to NAC Breda ====
On 10 July 2016, Agyepong signed on loan with Dutch second division team NAC Breda for the 2016–17 season. He made his debut on 12 August, playing 61 minutes in a 2–1 win over Achilles '29. On 2 December, he scored his first goal for the club, in the 92 minute of a 3–1 win over Almere City.

==== Loan to Hibernian ====
In August 2018, Agyepong joined Scottish Premiership club Hibernian on loan until the end of the 2018–19 season, pending approval of a work permit application. Agyepong missed much of the 2018–19 season due to knee and thigh injuries.

==== Loan to Waasland-Beveren ====
In August 2019, Agyepong was loaned to Belgian First Division A club Waasland-Beveren until the end of the 2019–20 season.

==== Loan to Lommel S.K. ====
In October 2020, Agyepong and teammate Aminu Mohammed joined Belgian First Division B side Lommel on loan until the end of the 2020–21 season. Like his parent club, Lommel are owned by City Football Group.

=== Muras United ===
On 9 April 2026, Kyrgyz Premier League club Muras United announced the signing of Agyepong.

== International career ==
Agyepong made his debut for the Ghana national football team in a 5–0 2019 Africa Cup of Nations qualification win over Ethiopia on 11 June 2017. He made four further appearances for Ghana during 2017, including two 2018 World Cup qualifiers against Congo. Despite his injury problems during the 2018–19 season, Agyepong was included in the provisional squad for the 2019 Africa Cup of Nations. He made the final squad and was selected for the first match, but suffered an injury after 36 minutes and did not play again in the tournament.

== Career statistics ==
=== Club ===
As of 13:24, 22 August 2022 (UTC)

Appearances and goals by club, season and competition
Club	Season	League			Cup		League Cup		Other		Total	
Club	Season	Division	Apps	Goals	Apps	Goals	Apps	Goals	Apps	Goals	Apps	Goals
Manchester City	2015–16	Premier League	0	0	0	0	0	0	0	0	0	0
FC Twente (loan)	2015–16	Eredivisie	14	1	0	0	—		—		14	1
NAC Breda (loan)	2016–17	Eerste Divisie	27	2	1	0	—		4 (Note: Appearances in the Eerste Divisie promotion play-offs)	1	32	3
NAC Breda (loan)	2017–18	Eredivisie	12	0	1	0	—		0	0	13	0
NAC Breda (loan)	Total		39	2	2	0	—		4	1	45	3
Hibernian (loan)	2018–19	Scottish Premiership	9	1	—		1	0	—		10	1
Waasland-Beveren (loan)	2019–20	Belgian First Division A	14	0	1	0	—		0	0	15	0
Lommel (loan)	2020–21	Belgian First Division B	0	0	0	0	—		0	0	0	0
Lommel (loan)	2021–22	Belgian First Division B	13	0	0	0	—		0	0	13	0
Lommel (loan)	Total		13	0	0	0	—		0	0	13	0
Career total			89	4	3	0	1	0	4	1	97	5

=== International ===
As of matches played on 15 July 2019

Ghana national team
Year	Apps	Goals
2017	5	0
2018	0	0
2019	1	0
Total	6	0
