= Kamohelo Mokotjo =

South African soccer player

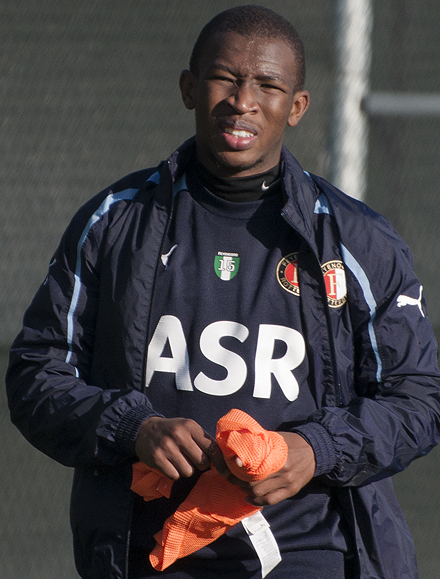
- Mokotjo while with Feyenoord in 2012

Personal information
- Full name: Kamohelo Mokotjo
- Date of birth: 11 March 1991 (age 35)
- Place of birth: Kutloanong Location, Odendaalsrus, South Africa
- Height: 1.70 m (5 ft 7 in)
- Position: Defensive midfielder

Youth career
- 2002–2008: SuperSport United

Senior career*
Years	Team	Apps	(Gls)
2008–2009	SuperSport United	1	(0)
2009–2013	Feyenoord	35	(0)
2009–2010	→ Excelsior (loan)	25	(1)
2013–2014	PEC Zwolle	27	(2)
2014–2017	Twente	97	(3)
2017–2020	Brentford	94	(5)
2020–2022	FC Cincinnati	22	(0)
2023–2024	Sekhukhune United	38	(0)
2024–2025	Cape Town City	19	(0)

International career^{‡}
- South Africa U12
- South Africa U20
2011	South Africa U23		
2012–2020	South Africa	23	(0)
- * Club domestic league appearances and goals as of 21:23, 15 May 2025 (UTC) ‡ National team caps and goals as of 28 April 2026 (UTC)

Kamohelo Mokotjo (born 11 March 1991) is a South African professional soccer player who plays as a defensive midfielder.

After beginning his career in his native South Africa, Mokotjo came to prominence in the Netherlands with FC Twente and later played in England for Brentford and in the United States for FC Cincinnati. He returned to South Africa in 2023, where he played for Sekhukhune United and Cape Town City. Mokotjo represented South Africa at international level.

== Club career ==
=== SuperSport United ===
A defensive midfielder, Mokotjo began his career in his native South Africa with the Supersport United academy. He was promoted into the first team squad at age 16 and made one senior appearance for the club, as a substitute for Shane Poggenpoel in a 1–0 defeat to Santos on 20 December 2008. He was an unused substitute on three other occasions during the 2008–09 season and departed the club in August 2009.

=== Feyenoord ===
==== 2010–2011 and loan to Excelsior ====
After a successful three month trial, Mokotjo transferred to Dutch Eredivisie club Feyenoord on 28 August 2009. Mokotjo was immediately loaned to Eerste Divisie club Excelsior for the remainder of the 2009–10 season. He made 30 appearances and scored one goal in a successful season, which ended with Excelsior winning promotion to the Eredivisie through the promotion/relegation playoffs. Mokotjo was named as the club's Young Player of the Year.

Mokotjo made his Feyenoord debut with a start in a KNVB Cup third round shootout defeat to Roda JC Kerkrade on 22 September 2010. During an injury-affected 2010–11 season, he made 15 appearances.

==== 2011–12 season ====
Mokotjo was utilised mostly as a substitute and as a utility player by manager Ronald Koeman during the first half of the 2011–12 season, which prompted the suggestion that he would leave the club in search of first team football. Mokotjo remained at De Kuip and set up a goal in a key 4–2 De Klassieker victory over Ajax on 29 January 2012, which prompted the club to award him a new two-year contract. Despite suffering from another niggling injury, Mokotjo finished the 2011–12 season with 22 appearances and helped Feyenoord to a second-place finish in the Eredivisie.

==== 2012–13 season ====
Mokotjo was largely frozen out of the first team squad during the 2012–13 season, due to injuries and concerns over his rate of development. Despite rumours that he would go out on loan or leave the club permanently during the January transfer window, Mokotjo remained with the club throughout the season, but made just one appearance, as a 90th-minute substitute in a 3–2 victory over ADO Den Haag on 16 December 2012. Mokotjo departed Feyenoord in May 2013, having made 38 appearances in three seasons as a first team player with the club.

=== PEC Zwolle ===
On 10 May 2013, Mokotjo transferred to Eredivisie club PEC Zwolle. Despite some injury troubles, he had a successful first season at the MAC³PARK Stadion, making 33 appearances, scoring two goals and winning the first silverware of his career, the KNVB Cup, which qualified the club for the Europa League. For his performances during the season, he won the club's Supporters' Player of the Year award and was nominated as one of the Eredivisie's Most Valuable Players.

Mokotjo's first appearance of the 2014–15 season turned out to be his last for the club, a 1–0 victory over Ajax in the 2014 Johan Cruyff Shield, in which he set up Stef Nijland to score the Bluefingers' goal. He left the club on 8 August 2014, after making 34 appearances and scoring two goals during just over one season at the MAC³PARK Stadion.

=== Twente ===
==== 2014–2016 ====
On 8 August 2014, Mokotjo joined Eredivisie club FC Twente on a four-year contract for an undisclosed fee (reported to be €1.5 million), which was rumoured to be a club record. He had a solid first season at De Grolsch Veste, making 40 appearances and scoring one goal as Twente finished in mid-table. Mokotjo was again a mainstay in the team during the 2015–16 season and only missed matches for personal reasons.

==== 2016–17 season ====
Following the departure of Felipe Gutiérrez, Mokotjo was named as captain for the 2016–17 season and acquired the nickname "The General" for his leadership of the young squad. He made 33 appearances and scored one goal during a season in which the Tukkers would have qualified for the Eredivisie European competition playoffs, had the club not been in the middle of a ban from playing in European competitions. He left the club in July 2017, having made 105 appearances and scored three goals during three seasons at De Grolsch Veste.

=== Brentford ===
==== 2017–18 season ====
On 7 July 2017, Mokotjo moved to England to join Championship club Brentford on a three-year contract for an undisclosed fee, reported to be €1 million. The transfer completed a two-year scouting process, with previous transfer bids having failed due to work permit issues. Despite admitting that he found it difficult to adjust to English football, Mokotjo held down a starting spot throughout the early months of the campaign and by mid-December was ready "to take it to the next level". He scored his first goal for the club with the opener in a 2–0 victory over Sunderland on 17 February 2018 and finished the 2017–18 season with 41 appearances.

==== 2018–19 season ====
Mokotjo alternated between a starting and a substitute role during the early months of the 2018–19 season under head coach Dean Smith, but after recovering from a calf injury in December 2018, he broke into the starting lineup under Smith's replacement Thomas Frank. When fit, Mokotjo was a regular starter and finished the season with 37 appearances and four goals.

==== 2019–20 season ====
During the first half of the 2019–20 season, Mokotjo alternated between starting and substitute roles, before being sidelined with a knee ligament injury in January 2020. After returning to fitness, Mokotjo signed a short-term contract extension to ensure his availability for the final matches of the COVID-19-affected 2019–20 season. He finished the season with 26 appearances and one goal, but did not feature during the Bees' unsuccessful playoff campaign and was released when his short-term contract expired. During three seasons at Griffin Park, Mokotjo made 102 appearances and scored six goals.

=== FC Cincinnati ===
On 20 August 2020, Mokotjo moved to the United States to sign an undisclosed-length contract with Major League Soccer club FC Cincinnati on a free transfer. Work permit and quarantine issues delayed Mokotjo's debut until 4 October 2020 and he made 9 appearances during what remained of the 2020 season. He made just 13 appearances during a 2021 season in which FC Cincinnati finished bottom of Major League Soccer. Mokotjo was left unprotected by the club in the 2021 MLS Expansion Draft, but was not picked. On 18 January 2022, the club bought out Mokotjo's guaranteed contract. He made just 22 appearances during 18 months at the TQL Stadium.

=== Free agent ===
In January 2022, it was reported that Mokotjo would return to FC Twente on trial, but the arrangement was scuppered due to him requiring knee surgery. Following the surgery, he undertook his rehab with the club and began the 2022–23 pre-season with the squad. In early August 2022, a reoccurrence of Mokotjo's knee injury led to the possibility of a contract being put on hold. Moves to SuperSport United and Kaizer Chiefs in January 2023 failed to materialise.

=== Sekhukhune United ===
On 12 January 2023, Mokotjo signed an 18-month contract with South African Premier Division club Sekhukhune United. He made 14 appearances during the remainder of the 2022–23 season and was a part of the squad which reached the 2023 Nedbank Cup Final. Mokotjo made 36 appearances during a 2023–24 season in which the club narrowly missed the CAF Confederation Cup place. He departed the club after his contract expired and finished his career with the club on 51 appearances.

=== Cape Town City ===
On 4 July 2024, Mokotjo signed an undisclosed-length contract with South African Premier Division club Cape Town City. He made 24 appearances before parting ways with the relegation-threatened club with two league matches left to play in the 2024–25 season.

== International career ==
Mokotjo captained South Africa's U12 national team to victory at the 2003 Danone Nations Cup in France and was named as the Player of the Tournament. He was a member of the South Africa U20 squad that competed at the 2009 U20 World Cup and he made one appearance at the tournament, playing the opening 66 minutes of the team's 2–1 defeat to Ghana in the round of 16. Mokotjo played for the U23 team during its unsuccessful attempt to qualify for the 2012 Summer Olympics.

Mokotjo made his senior debut for South Africa with an injury-time substitute appearance in a 2–0 friendly win over Mozambique on 11 September 2012. He made five further appearances over the following three years before announcing his retirement from international football in April 2016, citing "that current circumstances are not conducive to for me to break into the Bafana line-up". Mokotjo returned to the team in 2017, with a start in a 3–1 friendly win over Guinea-Bissau on 25 March 2017. He was named in South Africa's 2019 Africa Cup of Nations squad and played in each match of the team's run to the quarter-finals.

== Other football roles ==
Together with radio DJ Nyakallo Leine, Mokotjo is co-owner and chairman of South African football club D'General. As of the 2022–23 season, the club was a member of the SAFA Second Division.

== Personal life ==
In 2010, Mokotjo revealed that in order to become a professional footballer, he had to move out of his family home at age 11. He received Dutch citizenship in December 2016 and subsequently lost his South African citizenship, but regained it in March 2017.

== Career statistics ==
=== Club ===
As of match played 3 May 2025

Appearances and goals by club, season and competition
Club	Season	League			National cup (Note: Includes Nedbank Cup, KNVB Cup, FA Cup, U.S. Open Cup)		League cup (Note: Includes EFL Cup)		Continental		Other		Total	
Club	Season	Division	Apps	Goals	Apps	Goals	Apps	Goals	Apps	Goals	Apps	Goals	Apps	Goals
SuperSport United	2008–09	South African Premier Division	1	0	0	0	—		—		—		1	0
Feyenoord	2010–11	Eredivisie	14	0	1	0	—		0	0	—		15	0
Feyenoord	2011–12	Eredivisie	20	0	2	0	—		—		—		22	0
Feyenoord	2012–13	Eredivisie	1	0	0	0	—		0	0	—		1	0
Feyenoord	Total		35	0	3	0	—		0	0	—		38	0
Excelsior (loan)	2009–10	Eerste Divisie	25	1	1	0	—		—		4 (Note: Appearances in Eerste Divisie promotion play-offs)	0	30	1
PEC Zwolle	2013–14	Eredivisie	27	2	6	0	—		—		—		33	2
PEC Zwolle	2014–15	Eredivisie	0	0	—		—		—		1 (Note: Appearance in Johan Cruyff Shield)	0	1	0
PEC Zwolle	Total		27	2	6	0	—		—		1	0	34	2
Twente	2014–15	Eredivisie	33	1	5	0	—		2 (Note: Appearances in Europa League)	0	—		40	1
Twente	2015–16	Eredivisie	31	1	1	0	—		—		—		32	1
Twente	2016–17	Eredivisie	33	1	0	0	—		—		—		33	1
Twente	Total		97	3	6	0	—		2	0	—		105	3
Brentford	2017–18	Championship	35	1	1	0	3	0	—		—		39	1
Brentford	2018–19	Championship	34	3	1	0	2	1	—		—		37	4
Brentford	2019–20	Championship	25	1	1	0	0	0	—		0	0	26	1
Brentford	Total		94	5	3	0	5	1	—		0	0	102	6
FC Cincinnati	2020	Major League Soccer	9	0	—		—		—		—		9	0
FC Cincinnati	2021	Major League Soccer	13	0	0	0	—		—		—		13	0
FC Cincinnati	Total		22	0	0	0	—		—		—		22	0
Sekhukhune United	2022–23	South African Premier Division	9	0	5	0	—		—		—		14	0
Sekhukhune United	2023–24	South African Premiership	28	0	2	0	—		3 (Note: Appearances in CAF Confederation Cup)	0	3 (Note: 2 appearances in Carling Knockout Cup, 1 appearance in MTN 8)	0	36	0
Sekhukhune United	Total		38	0	7	0	—		3	0	3	0	51	0
Cape Town City	2024–25	South African Premiership	19	0	1	0	—		—		4 (Note: 3 appearances in MTN 8, 1 appearance in Carling Knockout Cup)	0	24	0
Career total			357	11	27	0	5	1	5	0	12	0	406	12

=== International ===
As of match played 10 June 2021

Appearances and goals by national team and year
National team	Year	Apps	Goals
South Africa	2012	1	0
South Africa	2013	1	0
South Africa	2015	4	0
South Africa	2017	4	0
South Africa	2018	4	0
South Africa	2019	9	0
South Africa	2020	1	0
Total		23	0

== Honours ==
Excelsior

- Eredivisie promotion/relegation play-offs: 2009–10

PEC Zwolle

- KNVB Cup: 2013–14
- Johan Cruijff Shield: 2014

Individual

- PEC Zwolle Supporters' Player of the Year: 2013–14
- Excelsior Young Player of the Year: 2009–10
- Danone Nations Cup Player of the Tournament: 2003
