= Aziz Doufikar =

Moroccan footballer (born 1963)

Personal information
- Date of birth: 3 October 1963 (age 63)
- Place of birth: Casablanca, Morocco
- Height: 1.79 m (5 ft 10 in)
- Position: Attacking midfielder

Youth career
- SV Lelystad ‘67
- Ajax

Senior career*
Years	Team	Apps	(Gls)
1984–1987	PEC Zwolle	86	(24)
1987–1990	Espinho	70	(17)
1990–1991	Fortuna Sittard	36	(7)
1992	Eindhoven	5	(4)
1992–1995	Espinho	65	(9)
1995–1997	Vitória Setúbal	29	(10)
1997–1999	Esmoriz		
2000–2001	ADC Lobão		
2001–2002	Ala-Arriba		
2002–2003	SC Mêda		
- * Club domestic league appearances and goals

Aziz Doufikar (Arabic: عزيز ذو الفقار; born 3 October 1963) is a Moroccan former professional footballer who played as an offensive midfielder.

== Career ==
Born in Casablanca, Doufikar moved to the Netherlands when he was 10 years old and started playing football at local amateur side SV Lelystad '67. He then spent time at the Ajax academy. Doufikar was the first Moroccan professional football player in the Netherlands. He played in the Eredivisie for PEC Zwolle and Fortuna Sittard. Doufikar also spent time playing in Portugal with Sporting Espinho and Vitória Setúbal. He missed out on the 1986 FIFA World Cup when Co Adriaanse, who was his coach at PEC Zwolle at the time, refused to release him for the Morocco national football team preparations.

== After football ==
Doufikar transitioned into a career as a youth worker following his retirement from professional football. He became an integral figure in several football clubs, primarily serving as a staff member. Notably, it was under his guidance that he identified the talent of young Hakim Ziyech while the latter was playing in the youth teams of Reaal Dronten. Doufikar played a crucial role in motivating Ziyech to embark on his journey towards a professional football career.
