= Hakim Ziyech =

Moroccan-Dutch footballer (born 1993)

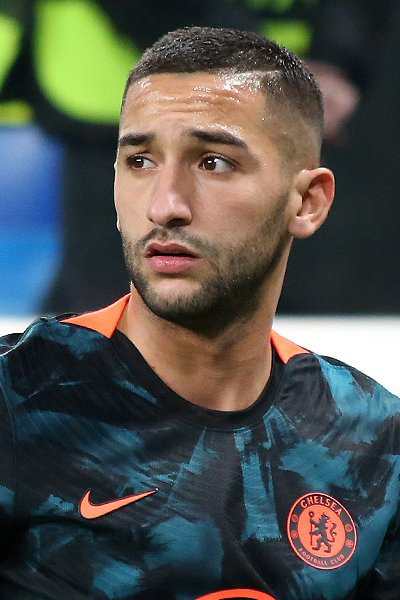
- Ziyech in 2021

Personal information
- Full name: Hakim Ziyech
- Date of birth: 19 March 1993 (age 33)
- Place of birth: Dronten, Netherlands
- Height: 1.80 m (5 ft 11 in)
- Positions: Right winger; attacking midfielder

Team information
- Current team: Botafogo
- Number: 22

Youth career
- 2001–2004: Reaal Dronten
- 2004–2007: ASV Dronten
- 2007–2012: Heerenveen

Senior career*
Years	Team	Apps	(Gls)
2012–2013	Heerenveen II	31	(14)
2012–2014	Heerenveen	36	(11)
2014–2016	Twente	68	(30)
2016–2020	Ajax	112	(38)
2020–2023	Chelsea	64	(6)
2023–2025	Galatasaray	23	(6)
2025	Al-Duhail	9	(1)
2025–2026	Wydad	12	(8)
2026–	Botafogo	6	(0)

International career
2012–2013	Netherlands U20	3	(1)
2013–2014	Netherlands U21	3	(2)
2015–2024	Morocco	64	(25)
- * Club domestic league appearances and goals as of 28 October 2026

Hakim Ziyech (Arabic: حكيم زياش, romanized: Ḥakīm Ziyāš; Berber languages: ⵃⴰⴽⵉⵎ ⵣⵉⵢⵢⴰⵛ, romanized: Ḥakim Ziyyac; born 19 March 1993) is a professional footballer who plays as a right winger or an attacking midfielder for Brasileiro Série A club Botafogo. Born in the Netherlands, he represented the Morocco national team. He is nicknamed "The Wizard", a title given to him by the supporters of his former club Ajax. Ziyech is known for his finishing, dribbling, long passes, technique, and ability from free kicks.

He started his professional career at Dutch club Heerenveen in 2012 and signed for fellow Dutch club Twente two years later. In 2016, he signed for Ajax on a five-year deal, with a reported transfer fee of €11m. The 2018–19 season was the most prolific season in Ziyech's career, with 16 goals and 13 assists in the Eredivisie, which Ajax won. In all competitions he scored 21 goals and 24 assists and he was selected as one of the 3 best midfielders in the UEFA Champions League. At the end of the same year, he was ranked 29th in The Guardian's list of "The 100 best footballers in the world". He joined English Premier League club Chelsea in the 2020–21 season, where he won the UEFA Champions League. He moved to Turkey with Galatasaray in 2023, winning the league twice. He then had short spells with Al-Duhail in Qatar and Wydad in Morocco.

Ziyech originally represented the Netherlands, appearing for them at Under-20 and Under-21 level. At senior level he chose to represent Morocco (the country his parents are from), making his debut in 2015. Ziyech represented Morocco at the FIFA World Cup in 2018 and 2022, and the Africa Cup of Nations in 2019 and 2023. At the 2022 World Cup, he led Morocco to make history as the first African nation to reach the World Cup semi-finals, serving as the Captain in the later matches. Since playing for Morocco, he has donated all attained earnings and bonuses from international play to various charities or to the staff of the team.

== Early life ==
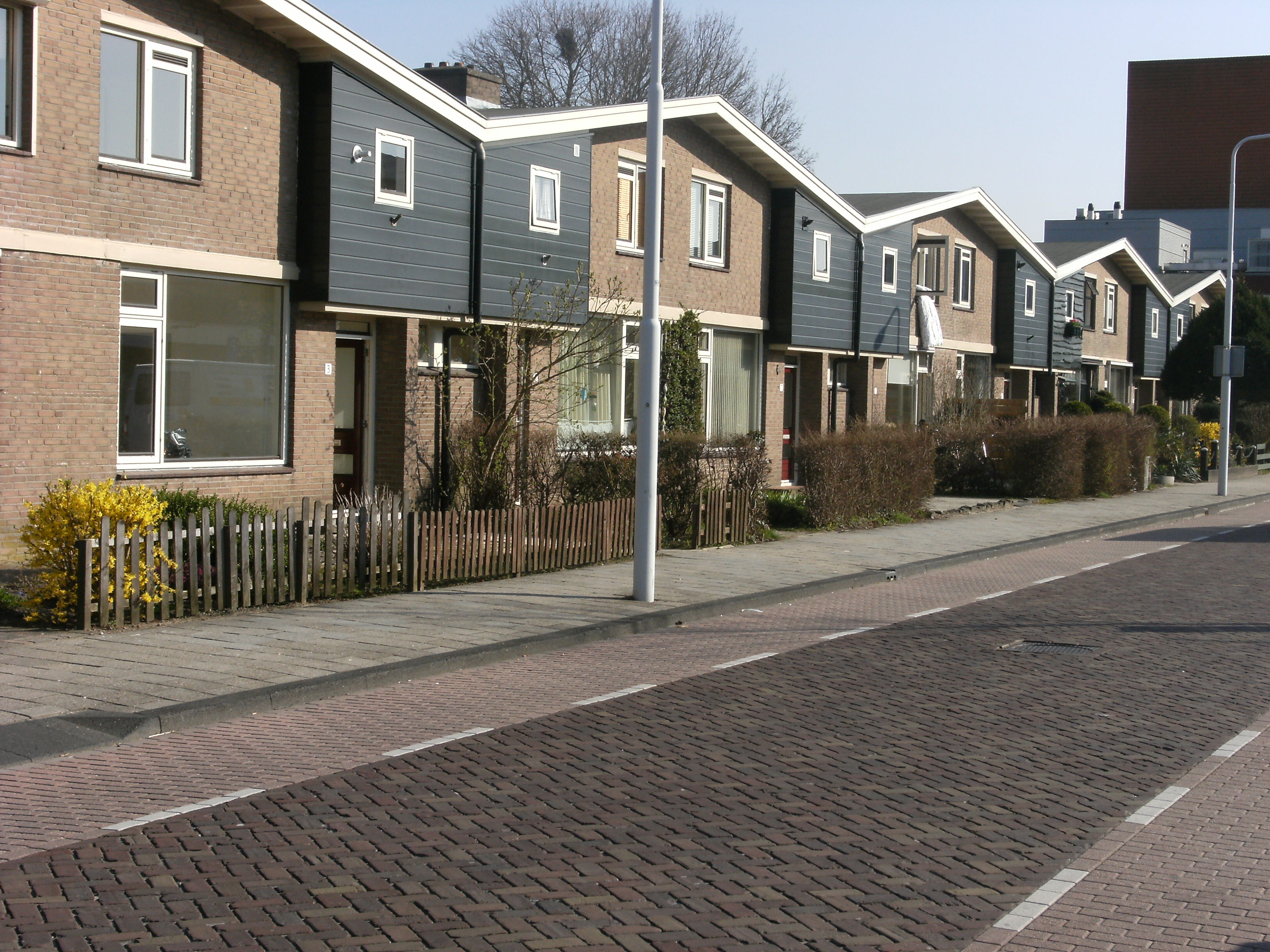
Dronten, birthplace of Hakim Ziyech.

Ziyech was born in Dronten, Flevoland to Moroccan parents from Tafoughalt, a Berber village in northeastern Morocco. His parents belonged to the tribal confederation of Aït Iznassen located near Berkane. Ziyech grew up in the southern part of Dronten. He was the youngest of the 9 children in his family. Like many Moroccans between the 1960s and 1990s, a large number of people from northern Morocco emigrated to the Benelux in search of work and better living conditions. (Note: Belgium and the Netherlands have experienced massive Moroccan immigration from northern Morocco. See: Moroccans in the Netherlands) Hakim Ziyech's father left Morocco in 1967 with his two sons Faouzi and Hicham (Note: Faouzi and Hicham are Hakim's two older brothers) for the Netherlands where he worked in a metal factory. Ziyech's mother joined them in the Netherlands and took on the role of homemaker. Hakim has dual nationality of The Netherlands and Morocco. With his brothers and his friends from the neighborhood, Ziyech spent hours playing football on the Cruyff Court esplanade opposite his home. During his childhood, Ziyech regularly watched Ajax stars on television such as Wesley Sneijder, Zlatan Ibrahimović and Rafael van der Vaart. (Note: In an interview with Fox Sports, Ziyech described Wesley Sneijder as having been his inspiration among footballers playing in the Netherlands during the 2000s) "There were a few players I loved watching, like Ronaldinho and Zinedine Zidane ...players of that caliber. I watched them a lot when I was little. I remember when I was ten years old, I watched their videos on YouTube every day", he said in an interview with UEFA in 2019.

Two of his brothers enrolled in the academies of PEC Zwolle and Heerenveen in the 1990s. As for Ziyech, aged seven, he asked his father to enroll him at a football club in order to practice his favorite sport. In 2001, he started playing football for his hometown club, Reaal Dronten. At Reaal Dronten, he met Aziz Doufikar who was part of the club staff, and the first Moroccan national to make an appearance in the Eredivisie. According to Ziyech, Doufikar would go on to become a great source of motivation to embark on a football career. In his neighborhood, Ziyech often went to the local youth center De Meerpaal to meet his friends and Doufikar, who was also an educator at the center. During this time, Ziyech has told that football was a dominant part of his life: "I went to school half an hour earlier every day with the ball in my hand. During lunch break, I played football. Once at home, I drank, I ate and I went outside again to play football... whenever I nutmegged a big kid, the whole neighbourhood would start screaming. In my life, I have fortunately made the right choices. I had to sort through a lot of my friends who were going adrift. In the end, my real training took place in the neighbourhood". Uninterested in school, Ziyech only devoted himself to football and the streets.

On 23 December 2003, only ten years old, he suffered a great personal trauma, witnessing the death of his father, with whom he had a close relationship. His father, Mohamed Ziyech had suffered from a neuromuscular disease for several months. This event pushed him into youth crime. He thus grew up with his mother, who was forced to raise her eight children using family allowances and unemployment benefits. Ziyech would see two of his brothers return to prison for burglary. They were subsequently dismissed from their respective clubs and would retire from football at an early age. One of the two brothers, Faouzi Ziyech has since stated: "Our last hope in the family was Hakim. Fortunately, he was able to quickly realise what was wrong, having four brothers who went down the wrong path".

Despite earlier support, the relationship between the two brothers deteriorated in later years. In 2023, Faouzi publicly criticised Hakim following an interview with Vogue, disputing his portrayal of their upbringing and accusing him of minimising the sacrifices made by others in the family. He claimed he had played a central role in Hakim's development, regularly transporting him to matches and training sessions, and facilitating his placement in a host family. The feud escalated in 2025 when Faouzi described a video of Hakim with their mother as a "hypocritical act," reflecting ongoing tensions between the siblings.

== Club career ==
=== Heerenveen ===
==== 2007–2012: Youth and early career ====
Under the guidance of Aziz Doufikar, Ziyech would return to football, progressing through the youth teams of Reaal Dronten and later ASV Dronten. He was also motivated by his older brother Faouzi to continue playing football and not to be discouraged. At the age of fourteen, he made his first return to Morocco to visit his father's grave. On his return to the Netherlands, he was invited on trials with professional clubs SC Heerenveen and Ajax. After impressing the Heerenveen scouts, he left his home in Dronten to be placed with a foster family in the town of Heerenveen, Friesland, where he joined SC Heerenveen's academy in 2007. Ajax had found Ziyech too small to progress in their academy. Once settled in at Heerenveen, he lived a turbulent life marked by delinquency, alcohol and drug problems, and he dropped out of school at age sixteen. Despite a good relationship with his foster family, who are of Armenian origin "he regularly comes home very late, sometimes drunk," says Doufikar. Having been an academy footballer for two years under youth coach Robin Veldman, Ziyech very rarely participated in matches, spending his evenings until five in the morning in the neighbourhood drinking alcohol and using hard drugs. Doufikar described Ziyech during his first years in Heerenveen's academy:

He drank, smoked and did drugs a lot, the only chance I had with him was to make him play in smaller tournaments. Fortunately, he very quickly realised that his future was football.

Hakim Ziyech saw Doufikar as his second father, spending his afternoons in indoor gyms playing two-on-two with his neighbourhood friends in his hometown of Dronten. At the age of sixteen, Ziyech participated in an indoor football tournament in the city of Tiel with Jong SC Heerenveen/Emmen. It was during this tournament that he met Mustapha Nakhli, his agent until 2022. In a 2016 interview, Ziyech said, "When I was sixteen, I was one of the best players on the team, but I was the only one who wasn't offered a contract. I often questioned myself: 'I'm a tough guy, and on top of that, I'm a Mocro.' I felt compelled to work harder." Despite his growing recognition, Ziyech continued to grapple with alcohol and drug dependency, even resorting to selling hard drugs to provide for his family's needs. To steer him away from a destructive path and bad habits, his former coach, Doufikar, kept Ziyech engaged in indoor football, emphasising the importance of focusing on the sport. (Note: Ziyech played for indoor football for FC Anatolia.)

Heerenveen had been monitoring Ziyech's potential since his early days in their academy. When he was just seventeen years old, his talent was noticed, leading to his promotion to the first team in January 2012. However, Ziyech's off-field conduct prompted his exclusion from the first team until he could demonstrate discipline. At eighteen, he came under the mentorship of Mustapha Nakhli, who rented an apartment in the Zuidas neighborhood of Amsterdam-Zuid, which they shared. Ziyech left his foster family in Heerenveen and resided in Amsterdam for three years with his agent.

==== 2012–2014: First team ====
In April 2012, Ziyech signed his first professional contract with Heerenveen, inking a two-year deal. However, after securing the contract, he had yet to make an official appearance for the club and was primarily involved in first-team training. His first unofficial appearance came on 10 July 2012 during a friendly match against the amateur club Be Quick Dokkum. In that match, Ziyech, starting alongside Oussama Tannane and Rajiv van La Parra, left an impression by scoring his first goal with a remarkable free kick. His performance earned him head coach Marco van Basten approval, and he assured him of a spot within Heerenveen's squad for the UEFA Europa League match against Rapid București. On 2 August 2012, Ziyech made his formal debut for Heerenveen in the first leg of the third qualifying round of the Europa League, against Rapid, playing a total of 53 minutes before being substituted. He made his Eredivisie debut for the club on 10 August, in a 2–0 loss to NEC.

Ziyech scored his first goal for Heerenveen in a 2–0 win over NAC Breda, on 10 August 2013. On 23 August, Ziyech provided two assists in a 3–3 draw with Ajax. On 8 November, Ziyech scored and provided an assist in a 5–2 win over Waalwijk. On 18 December, Ziyech scored two goals against AZ Alkmaar, in the fourth round of the KNVB Cup, one in regular time and a last-minute penalty to draw level and take the game into a penalty shootout, but he missed his penalty and Heerenveen were knocked out 6–5 on penalties. On 21 December, Ziyech scored twice and provided one assist in a 5–1 away win over AZ Alkmaar. On 18 January 2014, Ziyech scored in a 2–2 draw with Roda. On 9 February, he scored in a 3–1 win over Groningen. On 27 April, Ziyech scored once and provided an assist in a 4–1 win over Utrecht, after coming on as a substitute.

=== Twente ===
On 18 August 2014, Ziyech joined Twente for 3.5m euros, signing on a three-year contract and taking the number 10 shirt. On 5 October, Ziyech scored once and provided an assist in a 2–2 draw with AZ Alkmaar. On 6 March 2015, Ziyech scored twice in a 2–2 draw with Willem II. On 10 May, he provided three assists in a 3–0 home win over Dordrecht. On 17 May, Ziyech scored twice and provided an assist in a 3–1 away win over his former club Heerenveen. Ziyech finished the season with 11 goals and 15 assists in the Eredivisie. For the 2015–16 season, Ziyech was selected as captain of the club; however, he was stripped of the captaincy in early January 2016, after he made disrespectful comments against the club and publicly requesting a transfer. The 2015–16 season was the most prolific season in Ziyech's career, as he scored 17 goals and provided 10 assist in the Eredivisie.

=== Ajax ===
==== 2016–2018: Initial seasons and European final ====
On 30 August 2016, Ziyech signed for Ajax on a five-year deal, with a reported transfer of €11m. On 15 September, Ziyech was given a red card in the 79th minute, in a 2–1 win over Panathinaikos in the opening group game of the Europa League. Six days later, on 21 September, he scored his first goal for Ajax in a 5–0 win over Willem II in the KNVB Cup. On 2 October, Ziyech scored his first league goal for the club in a 3–2 win over Utrecht. On 20 October, he scored in a 2–2 draw with Celta Vigo in the Europa League. On 20 October, he scored in a 1–0 win over Excelsior. On 3 November, Ziyech scored in the reverse fixture against Celta Vigo in the Europa League, a 3–2 win. On 4 December, he scored a penalty in a 2–0 win over Groningen. On 15 January 2017, Ziyech scored twice in a 3–1 away win over Zwolle. On 29 January, he scored in a 3–0 win over Den Haag. On 8 April, he scored in a 5–1 away win over NEC.

On 12 August 2017, Ziyech scored the opening goal in a 1–2 defeat to Heracles Almelo. On 20 August, Ziyech scored in a 3–1 win over Groningen. On 9 September, Ziyech missed a penalty but eventually scored just five minutes later in a 3–0 win over Zwolle. On 18 November, Ziyech provided an assist in an 8–0 win over NAC Breda. On 26 November, he provided an assist in a 5–1 win over Roda. On 14 December, Ziyech scored in a 3–1 win over Excelsior. On 20 December, Ziyech missed a penalty against his former club Twente, in the round of sixteen of the KNVB Cup, with Ajax suffering elimination after losing the penalty shootout. On 4 February 2018, Ziyech scored an injury-time goal in a 3–1 win over NAC Breda. Three days later, on 7 February, he scored in a 4–2 away win over Roda. On 18 March, Ziyech scored twice in a 5–2 away win over Sparta Rotterdam. On 19 April, Ziyech scored in a 4–1 win over Venlo.

==== 2018–2020: Domestic double and departure ====
On 25 July 2018, Ziyech scored in a 2–0 win over Sturm Graz in the second qualifying round of the UEFA Champions League. On 22 August, Ziyech scored in a 3–1 win over Dynamo Kyiv in the play-off round of the UEFA Champions League. On 13 February 2019, he scored his first Champions League goal, scoring the equaliser in a 1–2 loss against Real Madrid in the round of 16. On 5 March 2019, he scored again in the 4–1 victory over Real Madrid in the second leg, which saw the title holders being knocked out and bringing Ajax to the quarter-finals, where they eliminated Juventus to reach the semi–finals of the competition.

On 30 April 2019, Ziyech assisted for the only goal in the Champions League semi–final first leg win at Tottenham Hotspur. He also scored the second goal for Ajax in the second leg of the semi-final, where Ajax were beaten 3–2 by Tottenham and were knocked out of the tournament on away goals with a 3–3 aggregate score. In August 2019, he signed a new three-year contract with Ajax.

In the 2019–20 UEFA Champions League group stage, Ziyech scored one goal each in a 3–0 away win against Valencia, and in a 2–0 away win over Lille. However, Ajax lost 1–0 at home to Valencia to be eliminated at the group stage.

=== Chelsea ===
==== 2020–21 season: European champion ====
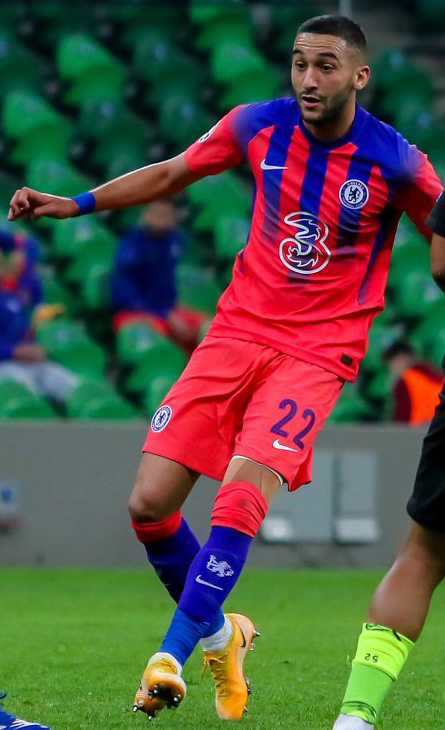
Ziyech playing for Chelsea in 2020

On 14 February 2020, it was announced that Ajax and Chelsea had reached an agreement for the transfer of Ziyech for a fee of €40 million (potentially increasing to a maximum of €44 million, with variable factors). He joined the Premier League club for the 2020–21 season. Ten days later, Chelsea announced they had agreed personal terms with Ziyech and that he had signed a five-year contract.

Ziyech made his league debut for Chelsea on 17 October 2020, in a 3–3 home draw against Southampton after he came off from the bench. On 28 October 2020, he scored his first Chelsea goal in a 4–0 away win over Krasnodar on matchday two of the Champions League. Three days later, Ziyech started his first league match for Chelsea, contributing with a goal and an assist in a 3–0 away win over Burnley. In doing so, Ziyech became the first Chelsea player since Diego Costa to score in his first two starts for Chelsea in all competitions. In Chelsea's next league match, Ziyech provided two assists and was named the man of the match as Chelsea defeated Sheffield United by a score of 4–1.

On 17 April 2021, Ziyech scored the only goal in Chelsea's FA Cup semi-final clash against Manchester City. On 29 May 2021, Ziyech won the 2021 UEFA Champions League Final with Chelsea 1–0 against Manchester City, but did not play in the final. Hence, he became the third Moroccan to win the competition, after Munir and Achraf Hakimi. Ziyech started ten matches and scored two goals in Chelsea's run to the final of the competition, including one against Atlético Madrid in the Round of 16 second leg at Stamford Bridge.

==== 2021–22 season: UEFA Super Cup and FIFA Club World Cup titles ====
On 11 August 2021, Ziyech scored against Villarreal to give Chelsea their first UEFA Super Cup in 23 years, as they won on penalties. Ziyech was subbed off shortly before half-time with his arm in a sling after challenging for a header inside his own penalty area and landing badly. On 2 November, he scored the only goal in a 1–0 away victory over Malmö in the Champions League, in which he managed to equal the most goals scored by a Moroccan in the competition, Marouane Chamakh with eight goals.

On 18 January 2022, Ziyech scored in a 1–1 draw against Brighton. On 23 January, Ziyech scored a wonderful curling shot against Tottenham Hotspur in a 2–0 victory. On 12 February, Ziyech was substitute as Chelsea won the 2021 FIFA Club World Cup title.

==== 2022–23 season: Dip in form and failed loan move ====
In the January transfer window, Ziyech could not move to Paris Saint-Germain on loan as his parent club submitted the wrong documents before the deadline, which were ultimately rejected by the LFP. He eventually ended the season with 24 appearances in all competitions. After the failure to leave for PSG, he criticized Chelsea for their lack of professionalism and respect. The loss of form coupled with the arrival of multiple signings led to him being excluded from the first team.

=== Galatasaray ===
On 19 August 2023, Süper Lig side Galatasaray announced that Ziyech arrived in Istanbul to complete his transfer to Turkey. On 20 August 2023, Ziyech completed a season-long loan to Galatasaray, with an obligation to join permanently.

On 16 September 2023, Ziyech made his debut in a 4–2 home win against Samsunspor coming off the bench to provide an assist to Mauro Icardi. On 20 September, he made his first start in a 2–2 UEFA Champions League group stage draw with FC Copenhagen. Three days later, on 23 September, he scored his first goal for Galatasaray in a 2–1 win at İstanbul Başakşehir.

On 1 November 2023, Ziyech was nominated for the 2023 African Footballer of the Year by CAF. On 29 November, he scored a brace in the 2023–24 UEFA Champions League group stage match against Manchester United, on 29 January 2025, it was stated that Ziyech's contract was mutually terminated. Disputes with the upper management led to his premature departure from Türkiye.

=== Al-Duhail ===
On 30 January 2025, Ziyech joined Qatar Stars League club Al-Duhail. Although contract details were not disclosed, reports indicated a short-term agreement. He scored his first goal for the club on 8 March, contributing to a 4–2 away win over Al Ahli in the league.

On 31 May 2025, it was announced that Ziyech's contract had been terminated by mutual consent, ending his 4-month stint in Qatar.

=== Wydad AC ===
On 22 October 2025, Ziyech signed a two-year contract with Botola Pro club Wydad AC in Morocco. His transfer is considered by many to be the biggest in the league's history. His primary motivation to sign for Wydad was to play football in Morocco and re-connect to his ancestral roots. CAF described Ziyech's transfer as a major gain both on the commercial and sporting fronts.

On 25 January 2026, Ziyech played his first match for the club against Congolese side Maniema Union in the 2025–26 CAF Confederation Cup. On 23 May, he scored his first hat-trick for Wydad in a 3–2 Botola Pro match win against Hassania Agadir. Later that year, on 6 September, his contract was terminated by mutual agreement.

=== Botafogo ===
On 9 September 2026, Ziyech joined Brasileiro Série A club Botafogo on a free transfer, signing a contract until the end of 2028.

== International career ==
=== Netherlands ===
Born in the Netherlands to a Moroccan family, Ziyech was eligible to play for either Netherlands or Morocco national team at international level. He played for Dutch national youth teams, playing for the under-19, under-20 and under-21 squads. However, he opted to play for Morocco at senior level. He received his first call-up to the senior squad in May 2015 for friendly matches against the United States and Latvia.

=== Morocco ===
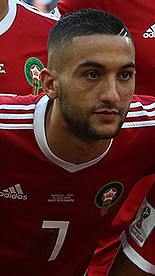
Ziyech lining up for Morocco in 2018

In September 2015, Ziyech confirmed his choice to represent Morocco on the international stage. Ziyech made his debut for the national team on 9 October, in a 1–0 defeat to the Ivory Coast. On 27 May 2016, he scored his first two goals for Morocco, in a 2–0 win over Congo. On 4 September, Ziyech scored in a 2–0 win over São Tomé and Príncipe in a 2017 Africa Cup of Nations qualifying match.

In January 2017, Morocco manager Hervé Renard surprisingly did not select Ziyech for either the preliminary nor the final 23-man Morocco squad for the 2017 Africa Cup of Nations. Ziyech then rejected a last-minute call-up as replacement for the injured Younès Belhanda, stating that he would not accept any further call-ups as long as Renard was still the Moroccan national team's coach. In June, he once again rejected call-ups for some friendlies and Africa Cup of Nations qualifiers. Renard later apologised for the incident. On 1 September, Ziyech returned to the national side, and scored in a 6–0 win over Mali, in a qualifying match for the 2018 FIFA World Cup. He was selected for the final 23-man squad for the 2018 FIFA World Cup.

In September 2021, Ziyech was omitted from the national team squad due to alleged "poor attitude", having previously refused to play, citing an injury. Manager Vahid Halilhodžić said, "For the first time in my coaching career, I saw a national team player who doesn't want to train and claims to be injured, although tests have shown he can play. I won't tolerate it". Ziyech was then also left out of Morocco's 2021 Africa Cup of Nations squad.

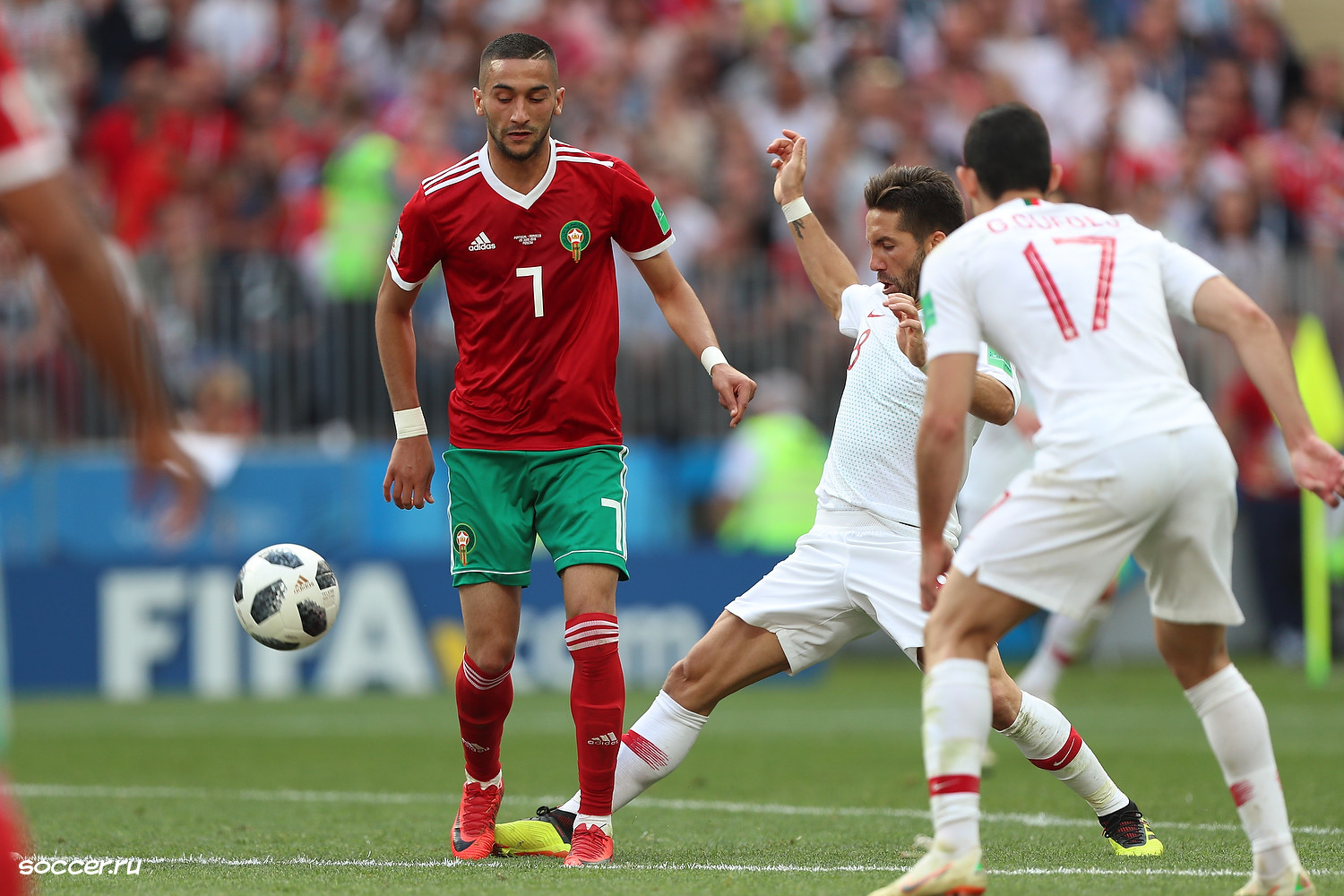
Ziyech playing for Morocco in 2018 FIFA World Cup against Portugal

On 8 February 2022, Ziyech announced his retirement from international football at the age of 28, having fallen out with Halilhodžić over his claims of Ziyech feigning injury. On 13 March 2022, Ziyech and his Moroccan teammate Noussair Mazraoui, both rejected Halilhodžić's invitation to represent the Morocco national football team in the 2022 FIFA World Cup qualification – CAF third round against DR Congo, and reaffirmed his decision to retire internationally. Halilhodžić was later sacked in August with Walid Regragui replacing him, which lead to Ziyech reversing his retirement and he rejoined the national team for the friendly against Chile on 23 September. Ziyech excelled as Morocco advanced to the semi-finals of the 2022 World Cup becoming the first African Team to do so in history, scoring a goal and providing an assist, while also receiving the player of the match award in the match against Belgium. Due to injuries, fitness issues and a dip in form, he has found himself out of regular involvement for the national team. He was left out of the squad for the 2025 AFCON, as he was still undergoing rehabilitation after his switch to Wydad AC.

== Style of play ==
Ziyech is a right winger who likes to take up a wide starting position and then drive infield with the ball, on to his stronger left foot and into positions where he poses a threat on goal, either with shots, through balls or crosses. He is most dangerous coming into central areas and looking to play killer balls to teammates making diagonal runs towards goal from the left. He is particularly skilled at playing deft balls over a defence, and if his teammates time their runs well, they often very suddenly find themselves with a one-on-one shooting opportunity. His movement off the flank means the right-back can overlap.

Ziyech is known for his ball control, beating defenders with swerves and dips to create scoring opportunities. He has the speed, balance and awareness to create chances for his teammate and to finish off attacks himself.

His movements infield often cause problems for opposition defenders, allowing for his teammates to get into space. Ziyech's strong positioning skills enable him to make quick moves into space to create chances. When he does get into a position to shoot from range, he usually looks to bend his foot around the ball and aim for the far corner.

His discipline has been called into question on several occasions, given his dubious record of falling out with several managers at both club and national level.

== Personal life ==
Ziyech speaks Dutch and English. He is not fluent in Darija, instead using English to communicate with Moroccan fans and journalists.

Ziyech has been described as a devout and practicing Muslim. He prefers to maintain strict privacy over his personal life and affairs.

He supports the Palestinian cause and donated three hundred thousand meals to the Gaza Strip in March 2025.

== Career statistics ==
=== Club ===
As of match played 28 October 2026

Appearances and goals by club, season and competition
Club	Season	League			National cup (Note: Includes KNVB Cup, FA Cup, Emir of Qatar Cup)		League cup (Note: Includes EFL Cup, Qatar Crown Prince Cup)		Continental		Other		Total	
Club	Season	Division	Apps	Goals	Apps	Goals	Apps	Goals	Apps	Goals	Apps	Goals	Apps	Goals
Heerenveen II	2012–13	Beloften Eredivisie	31	14	—		—		—		—		31	14
Heerenveen	2012–13	Eredivisie	3	0	1	0	—		2 (Note: Appearances in UEFA Europa League)	0	2 (Note: Appearances in Eredivisie European play-offs)	0	8	0
Heerenveen	2013–14	Eredivisie	31	9	3	2	—		—		2	0	36	11
Heerenveen	2014–15	Eredivisie	2	2	—		—		—		—		2	2
Heerenveen	Total		36	11	4	2	—		2	0	4	0	46	13
Twente	2014–15	Eredivisie	31	11	5	4	—		2	0	—		38	15
Twente	2015–16	Eredivisie	33	17	1	0	—		—		—		34	17
Twente	2016–17	Eredivisie	4	2	—		—		—		—		4	2
Twente	Total		68	30	6	4	—		2	0	—		76	34
Ajax	2016–17	Eredivisie	28	7	1	1	—		13	2	—		42	10
Ajax	2017–18	Eredivisie	34	9	1	0	—		4 (Note: Two appearances in UEFA Champions League, two appearances in UEFA Europa League)	0	—		39	9
Ajax	2018–19	Eredivisie	29	17	3	0	—		17 (Note: Appearances in UEFA Champions League)	5	—		49	22
Ajax	2019–20	Eredivisie	21	6	2	0	—		11 (Note: Ten appearances and three goals in UEFA Champions League, one appearance in UEFA Europa League)	3	1 (Note: Appearance in Johan Cruyff Shield)	0	35	9
Ajax	Total		112	39	7	1	—		45	10	1	0	165	50
Chelsea	2020–21	Premier League	23	2	6	2	0	0	10	2	—		39	6
Chelsea	2021–22	Premier League	23	4	5	2	4	0	9	1	3 (Note: One appearance and one goal in UEFA Super Cup, two appearances in FIFA Club World Cup)	1	44	8
Chelsea	2022–23	Premier League	18	0	1	0	1	0	4	0	—		24	0
Chelsea	Total		64	6	12	4	5	0	23	3	3	1	107	14
Galatasaray	2023–24	Süper Lig	18	6	—		—		5	2	0	0	23	8
Galatasaray	2024–25	Süper Lig	5	0	—		—		5 (Note: Two appearances in UEFA Champions League, three appearances in UEFA Europa League)	0	1 (Note: Appearance in Turkish Super Cup)	0	11	0
Galatasaray	Total		23	6	—		—		10	2	1	0	34	8
Al-Duhail	2024–25	Qatar Stars League	9	1	2	0	2	0	—		—		13	1
Wydad AC	2025–26	Botola Pro	12	8	0	0	—		4 (Note: Appearances in CAF Confederation Cup)	1	—		16	9
Botafogo	2026	Série A	6	0	—		—		—		—		6	0
Career total			361	115	31	11	7	0	86	16	9	1	494	143

=== International ===
As of match played 9 September 2024

Appearances and goals by national team and year
National team	Year	Apps	Goals
Morocco	2015	4	0
Morocco	2016	5	5
Morocco	2017	4	2
Morocco	2018	10	5
Morocco	2019	10	2
Morocco	2020	3	3
Morocco	2021	4	0
Morocco	2022	10	2
Morocco	2023	5	2
Morocco	2024	9	4
Total		64	25

Morocco score listed first, score column indicates score after each Ziyech goal.

List of international goals scored by Hakim Ziyech
No.	Date	Venue	Cap	Opponent	Score	Result	Competition
1	27 May 2016	Grand Stade de Tanger, Tangier, Morocco	6	Congo	1–0	2–0	Friendly
2	27 May 2016	Grand Stade de Tanger, Tangier, Morocco	6	Congo	2–0	2–0	Friendly
3	4 September 2016	Prince Moulay Abdellah Stadium, Rabat, Morocco	8	São Tomé and Príncipe	1–0	2–0	2017 Africa Cup of Nations qualification
4	11 October 2016	Stade de Marrakech, Marrakesh, Morocco	9	Canada	2–0	4–0	Friendly
5	11 October 2016	Stade de Marrakech, Marrakesh, Morocco	9	Canada	3–0	4–0	Friendly
6	1 September 2017	Prince Moulay Abdellah Stadium, Rabat, Morocco	10	Mali	1–0	6–0	2018 FIFA World Cup qualification
7	1 September 2017	Prince Moulay Abdellah Stadium, Rabat, Morocco	10	Mali	3–0	6–0	2018 FIFA World Cup qualification
8	23 March 2018	Stadio Olimpico, Turin, Italy	14	Serbia	1–0	2–1	Friendly
9	9 June 2018	A. Le Coq Arena, Tallinn, Estonia	18	Estonia	2–0	3–1	Friendly
10	9 September 2018	Stade Mohammed V, Casablanca, Morocco	22	Malawi	1–0	3–0	2019 Africa Cup of Nations qualification
11	16 November 2018	Stade Mohammed V, Casablanca, Morocco	23	Cameroon	1–0	2–0	2019 Africa Cup of Nations qualification
12	16 November 2018	Stade Mohammed V, Casablanca, Morocco	23	Cameroon	2–0	2–0	2019 Africa Cup of Nations qualification
13	16 June 2019	Stade de Marrakech, Marrakesh, Morocco	25	Zambia	1–1	2–3	Friendly
14	16 June 2019	Stade de Marrakech, Marrakesh, Morocco	25	Zambia	2–2	2–3	Friendly
15	13 November 2020	Stade Mohammed V, Casablanca, Morocco	36	Central African Republic	2–1	4–1	2021 Africa Cup of Nations qualification
16	13 November 2020	Stade Mohammed V, Casablanca, Morocco	36	Central African Republic	3–1	4–1	2021 Africa Cup of Nations qualification
17	17 November 2020	Reunification Stadium, Douala, Cameroon	37	Central African Republic	1–0	2–0	2021 Africa Cup of Nations qualification
18	17 November 2022	Sharjah Stadium, Sharjah, United Arab Emirates	43	Georgia	2–0	3–0	Friendly
19	1 December 2022	Al Thumama Stadium, Doha, Qatar	46	Canada	1–0	2–1	2022 FIFA World Cup
20	18 June 2023	FNB Stadium, Johannesburg, South Africa	53	South Africa	1–2	1–2	2023 Africa Cup of Nations qualification
21	21 November 2023	Tanzania National Stadium, Dar es Salaam, Tanzania	55	Tanzania	1–0	2–0	2026 FIFA World Cup qualification
22	24 January 2024	Laurent Pokou Stadium, San-Pédro, Ivory Coast	59	Zambia	1–0	1–0	2023 Africa Cup of Nations
23	7 June 2024	Adrar Stadium, Agadir, Morocco	62	Zambia	1–0	2–1	2026 FIFA World Cup qualification
24	6 September 2024	Adrar Stadium, Agadir, Morocco	64	Gabon	1–0	4–1	2025 Africa Cup of Nations qualification
25	6 September 2024	Adrar Stadium, Agadir, Morocco	64	Gabon	2–0	4–1	2025 Africa Cup of Nations qualification

== Honours ==
Ajax

- Eredivisie: 2018–19
- KNVB Cup: 2018–19
- Johan Cruyff Shield: 2019
- UEFA Europa League runner-up: 2016–17

Chelsea

- UEFA Champions League: 2020–21
- UEFA Super Cup: 2021
- FIFA Club World Cup: 2021
- FA Cup runner-up: 2020–21, 2021–22
- EFL Cup runner-up: 2021–22

Galatasaray

- Süper Lig: 2023–24, 2024–25
- Turkish Super Cup: 2023

Al Duhail

- Qatar Cup runner-up: 2025

Individual

- UMFP Best Moroccan Player Abroad: 2016, 2019
- UEFA Champions League Squad of the Season: 2018–19
- Eredivisie top assist provider: 2014–15, 2016–17, 2017–18, 2018–19
- Eredivisie Team of the Season: 2017–18, 2018–19
- Eredivisie Player of the Month: October 2018, August 2019
- Dutch Footballer of the Year: 2017–18
- Voetbal Eredivisie Player of the Year: 2015–16, 2017–18, 2018–19
- Heerenveen Player of the Year: 2013–14
- Ajax Player of the Year: 2017–18, 2018–19, 2019–20
- Ajax Goal of the Season: 2019–20
- FA Cup Team of the Year: 2020–21
- Goal Africa Team of the Year: 2017, 2018, 2019
- France Football African Team of the Year: 2018, 2019, 2020
- CAF Team of the Year: 2019
- IFFHS CAF Men Team of The Year: 2020

Orders

- Order of the Throne: 2022
