= Marie Jonas de la Motte =

Dutch prostitute and art model

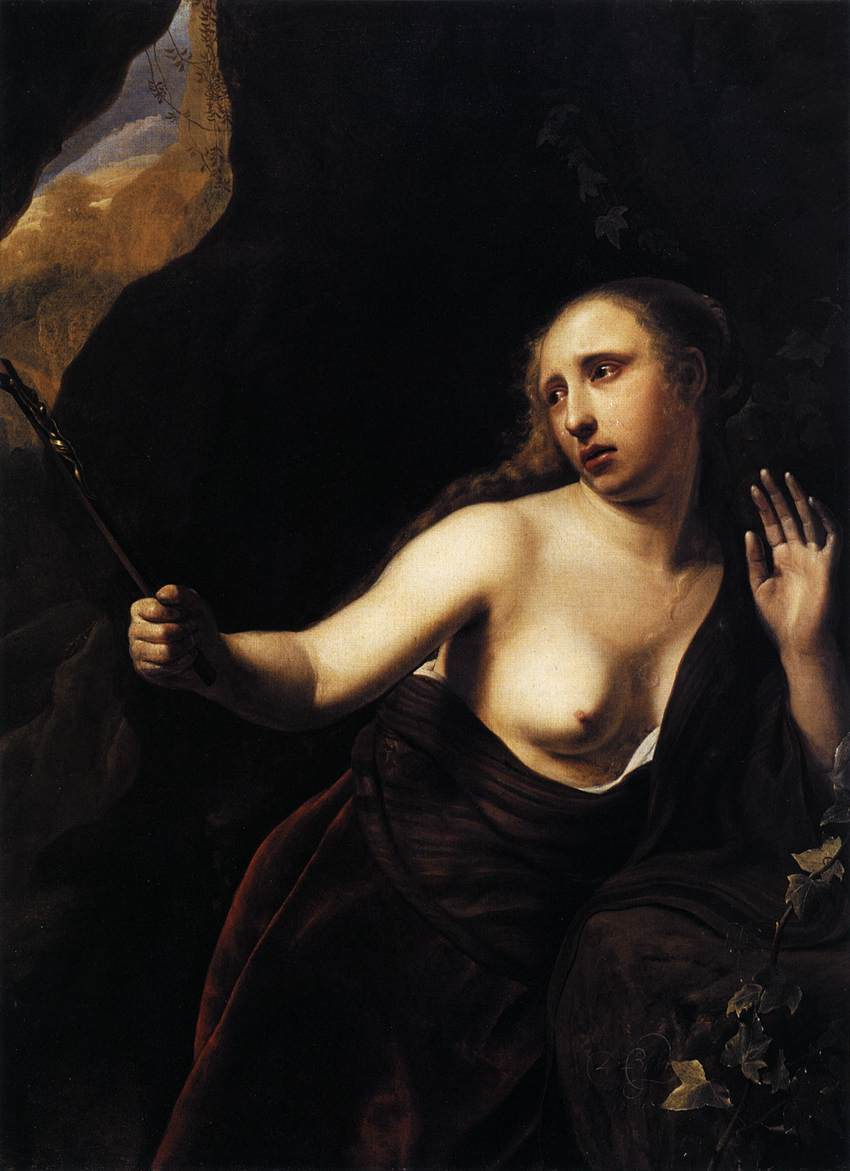
The Penitent Mary Magdalene by Dirck Bleker, with Marie Jonas de la Motte as model for Mary Magdalene.

Marie Jonas de la Motte (14 November 1627, Delft – after 1683) was a Dutch art model, prostitute and procurer. She is known as the model of the artist Dirck Bleker. A prostitute from at least 1652, she was a procurer and the madam of a brothel from 1665 onward.

== Life ==
She was one of at last seven children born to the soldier Jehan de la Motte and Elisabeth Habert. Because of the poverty and many children of her parents, she was forced to move to Amsterdam to support herself at an early age. She married Robbert Joris Toonszoon (1629-ca 1652) in 1651, Meijndert Pieterszoon (1627-?) in 1653, and finally NN van Beeck. Not much is known of her spouses, however.

She is confirmed as a prostitute in 1652, when she was warned by the authorities that she would be imprisoned if she should be arrested for prostitution again. During the 1650s, she also worked as an artist model. She is known as the model for at least two paintings of Dirck Bleker. In 1659, she was arrested for involvement in a knife fight, but the outcome is unknown. In 1665, she was arrested for having hosted prostitutes and their clients in her home; that is, for keeping a brothel. She was fined and exiled from the city for two years. In 1673 and 1683 she was again arrested for keeping a brothel. In 1680 she was apparently a madam of some repute. She was given light sentences and is not mentioned in any documents after 1683.
