= Nooitgedacht, Veenoord =

Windmill in Veenoord, Netherlands

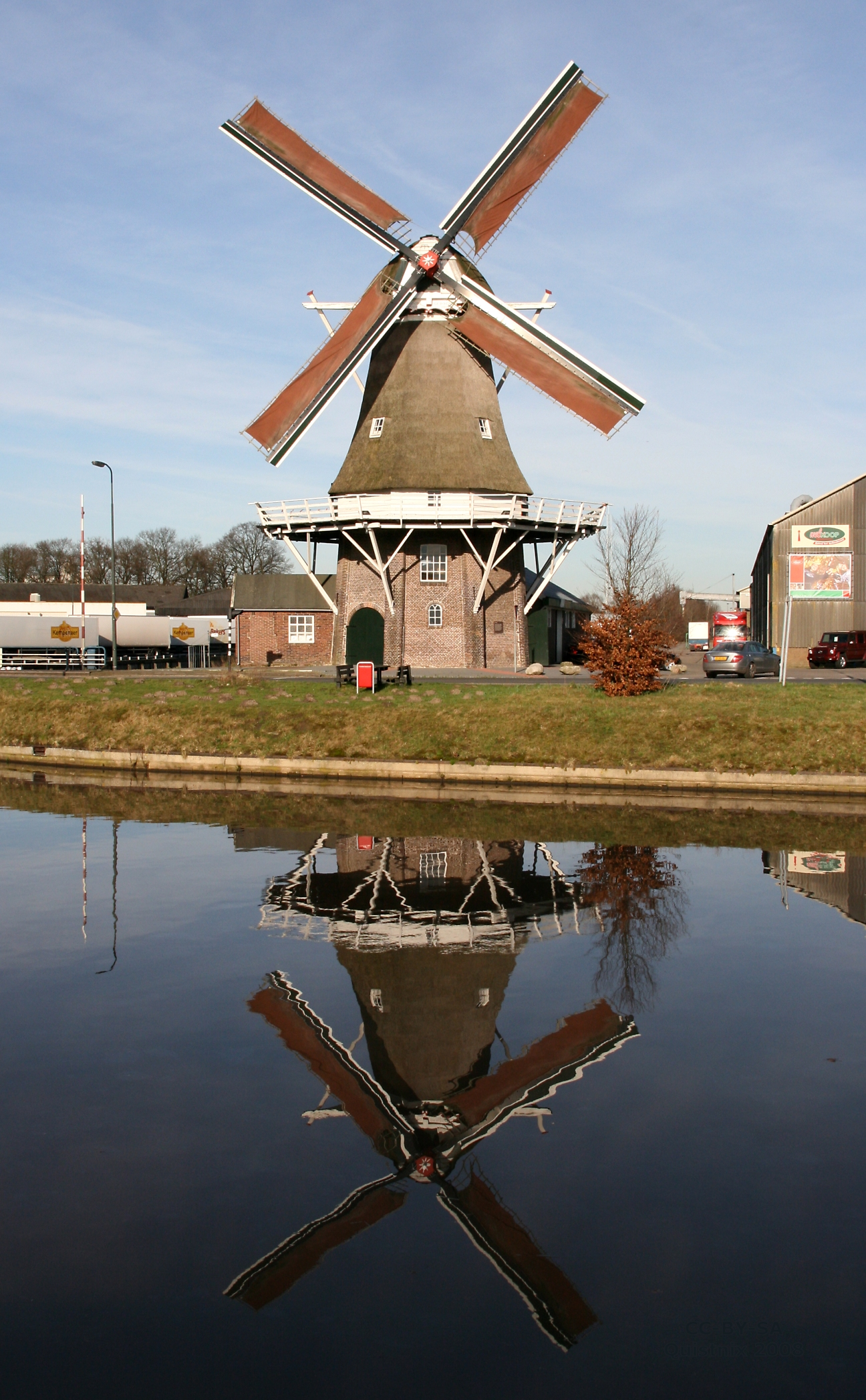
- Nooitgedacht, February 2009
- Interactive map of Nooitgedacht, Veenoord

Origin
- Mill name: Nooitgedacht
- Mill location: Industrieweg 15, 7844 NV Veenoord
- Coordinates: 52°42′02″N 6°50′47″E
- Operators: Beheerstichting Molen Nooitgedacht, owner: Molenstichting Drenthe
- Year built: 1916

Information
- Purpose: Corn mill
- Type: Smock mill
- Storeys: Two-storey smock
- Base storeys: Three-storey base
- Smock sides: Eight sides
- No. of sails: Four sails
- Type of sails: Common sails
- Windshaft: Cast iron
- Winding: Tailpole and winch
- No. of pairs of millstones: One pair
- Size of millstones: 1.40 metres (4 ft 7 in)

Nooitgedacht (English: Would never have thought it) is a smock mill in Veenoord, Drenthe, in the Netherlands, which has been restored to working order. The mill was built (in its current location) in 1916 and is listed as a Rijksmonument, number 33786.

== History ==
In 1862, a corn and barley mill was moved from Vlagtwedde and rebuilt close to the site of the present mill for miller Johannes van Aalst. This mill burnt down in 1904. To replace it, an oil mill was moved from Mensingeweer by millwright Van Ausselt. This mill was struck by lightning and burnt down in 1916. Van Ausselt and millwright Huberts, from Coevorden, moved a mill from Hankate, Overijssel, to replace it. This was the third move for that mill, which was originally built in 1732 as a barley mill at Leeuwarden, Friesland. By 1749 it was also an oil mill. It was moved between 1786 and 1805 to Heerenveen, Friesland, where it was known as Het Fortuin (English: The Fortune). In 1892 it was moved to Hankate, where the mill was known as the Molen van Kappert. The mill was worked until at least 1952, when it was sold to the Instituut voor de Landbouw. In 1973 it was transferred to De Hollandsche Molen and later still to Stichting Drentse Molens (English: Drenthe Mills Society).

== Description ==
Nooitgedacht is what the Dutch describe as an "achtkante stellingmolen". It is a two-storey smock mill with a stage on a three-storey brick base. The stage is at second-floor level, 6.25 metres (20 ft 6 in) above ground level. The smock and cap are thatched. The mill is winded by a tailpole and winch. The four Common sails have a span of 22.00 metres (72 ft 2 in) and are carried in a cast-iron windshaft which was cast by Enthuizen in 1872. The windshaft also carries the brake wheel which has 73 cogs. This drives the wallower (48 cogs) at the top of the upright shaft. At the bottom of the upright shaft, the great spur wheel, which has 92 cogs, drives the 1.40 metres (4 ft 7 in) diameter French Burr stones via a lantern pinion stone nut with 20 staves.

== Millers ==
- Johannes van Aalst (1916– )
- B H van Aalst (1940–52)

Reference for above:

== Public access ==
Nooitgedacht is open to the public on Saturdays and when the mill is turning.
