= Timo Plattel =

Dutch footballer

Personal information
- Date of birth: 12 March 1994 (age 32)
- Place of birth: Apeldoorn, Netherlands
- Height: 1.90 m (6 ft 3 in)
- Position: Goalkeeper

Team information
- Current team: Jong FC Utrecht (gk coach)

Youth career
- –2005: AGOVV Apeldoorn
- 2005–2009: Vitesse/AGOVV
- 2009–2013: Twente

Senior career*
| Years | Team | Apps | (Gls) |
| 2012–2017 | Jong FC Twente | 60 | (0) |
| 2013–2017 | Twente | 1 | (0) |
| 2017–2018 | Achilles '29 | 11 | (0) |
| 2018–2020 | Almere City | 20 | (0) |
| 2018–2020 | Jong Almere City | 5 | (0) |

International career
| 2013 | Netherlands U20 | 2 | (0) |
| 2015 | Netherlands U21 | 2 | (0) |

Managerial career
- 2021–2023: NEC (youth gk coach)
- 2023–: Jong FC Utrecht (gk coach)
- * Club domestic league appearances and goals

Timo Plattel (born 12 March 1994) is a retired Dutch professional footballer who played as a goalkeeper and current goalkeeper coach of Jong FC Utrecht.

== Career ==
Plattel began his career with FC Twente and made his professional debut on 5 May 2013 in a 1–1 draw against Heracles Almelo.

Plattel signed for Almere City FC on 1 March 2018 for the rest of the season.

=== Post-retirement ===
In April 2023, Plattel was hired as goalkeeper coach in NEC Nijmegen's academy. In the summer 2023, Plattel joined FC Utrecht, where he signed a three-year deal as goalkeeper coach of the clubs U21/Jong team under new manager Ivar van Dinteren.
