= Dirck Bleker =

Dutch Golden Age painter

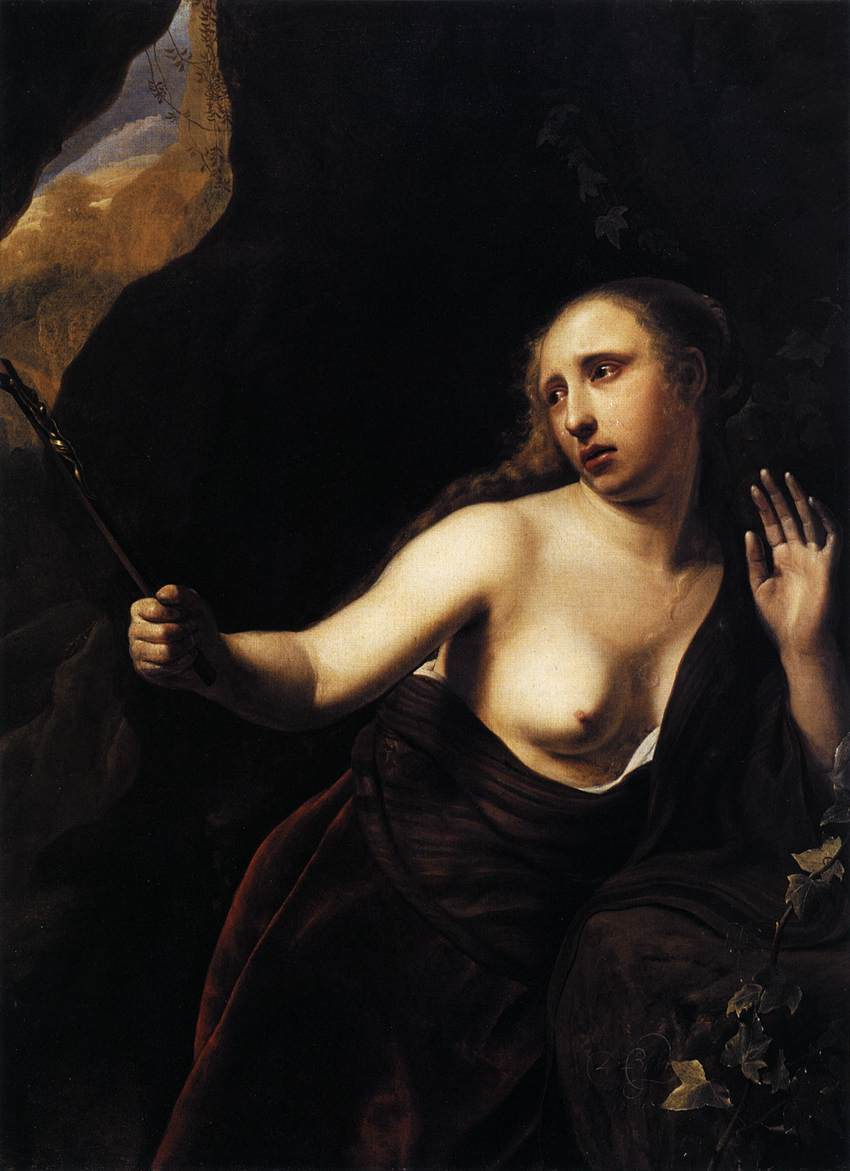
The Penitent Mary Magdalene by Dirck Bleker, with Marie Jonas de la Motte as model for Mary Magdalene.

Dirck Bleker (1621 in Haarlem – 1702 in Haarlem), was a Dutch Golden Age painter. According to Houbraken he painted a Danae for the Lord of Halsteren, Baljuw of Kennemerland, that was made famous by a poem by Joost van den Vondel. According to the RKD he was the son of the painter Gerrit Claesz Bleker and was a member of the Haarlem Guild of St. Luke. His name, marked with a 'd', which meant 'dead before Vincent van der Vinne', was in the list of guild painters kept by Laurens van der Vinne after his father's death in 1702.
