= Veenoord =

- Village
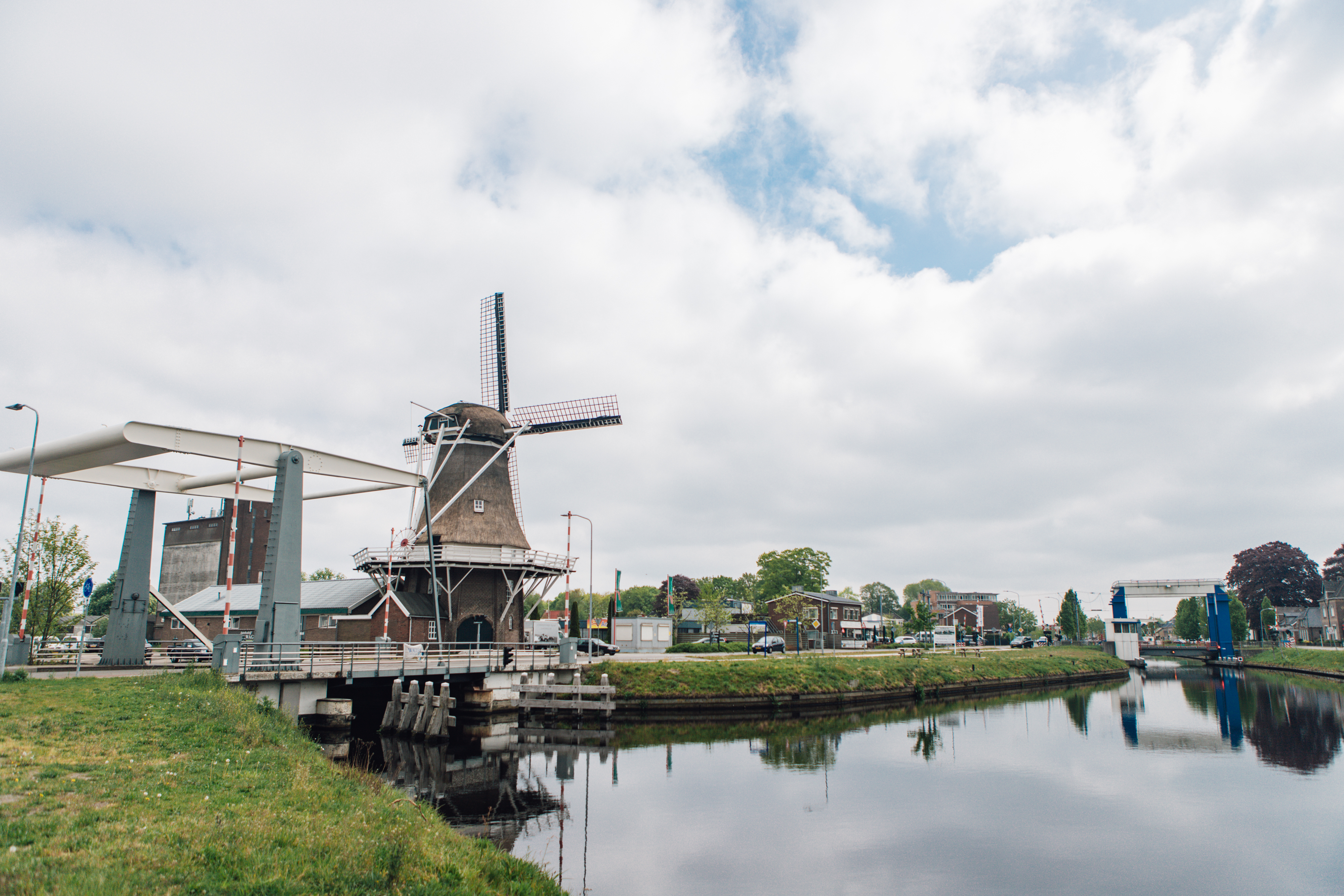
- Veenoord (2019)

- Location in province of Drenthe in the Netherlands Veenoord (Netherlands)
- Coordinates: 52°43′N 6°51′E
- Country: Netherlands
- Province: Drenthe
- Municipality: Emmen

Area
  - Total: 4.85 km^{2} (1.87 sq mi)
- Elevation: 15 m (49 ft)

Population (2021)
  - Total: 2,120
  - Density: 437/km^{2} (1,130/sq mi)
- Postal code: 7844
- Dialing code: 0591

Veenoord is a village in the Netherlands and it is part of the Emmen municipality in Drenthe. It forms a single urban area with Nieuw-Amsterdam. Vincent van Gogh stayed in the Scholte Inn during his Drenthe period.

== History ==
Veenoord translates to "bog settlement". Even though this suggests a peat colony, it was never a property of a company or city. The settlement started in 1859 when the Verlengde Hoogeveensche vaart was dug. The name Veenoord first appeared in 1899. In 1907, the potato starch factory Excelsior opened in the village, and remained until 1980.

In 1880, the Scholte Inn was built in Veenoord. In 1883, Vincent van Gogh spent three months in the inn during his Drenthe period. The building is publicly accessible and serves as a visitor centre.

In 1916, the gristmill Nooitgedacht was constructed in the village, and is the only monument of the village.

In 1998, Veenoord became part of Emmen. The villages of Veenoord and Nieuw-Amsterdam have merged into a single urban area.

== Sport ==
A motorcycle speedway track exists on the Nieuweweg road at the Sportpark Veenoord and is run by Speedway Veenoord. The facility has hosted important events, including international test matches in 1959, 1963 and 1973 and a qualifying round of the Speedway World Team Cup in 1999.

== Gallery ==
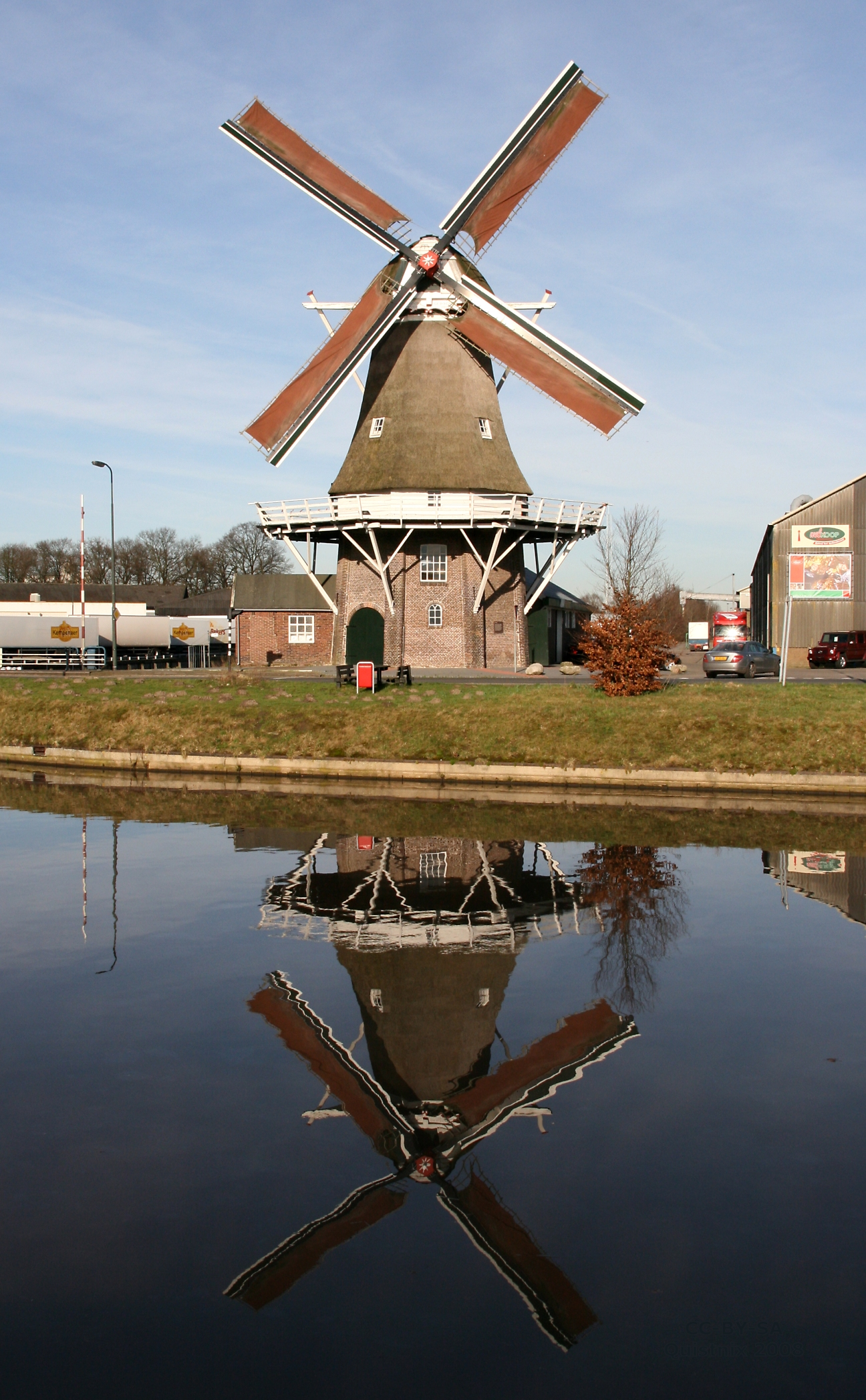
Windmill Nooitgedacht

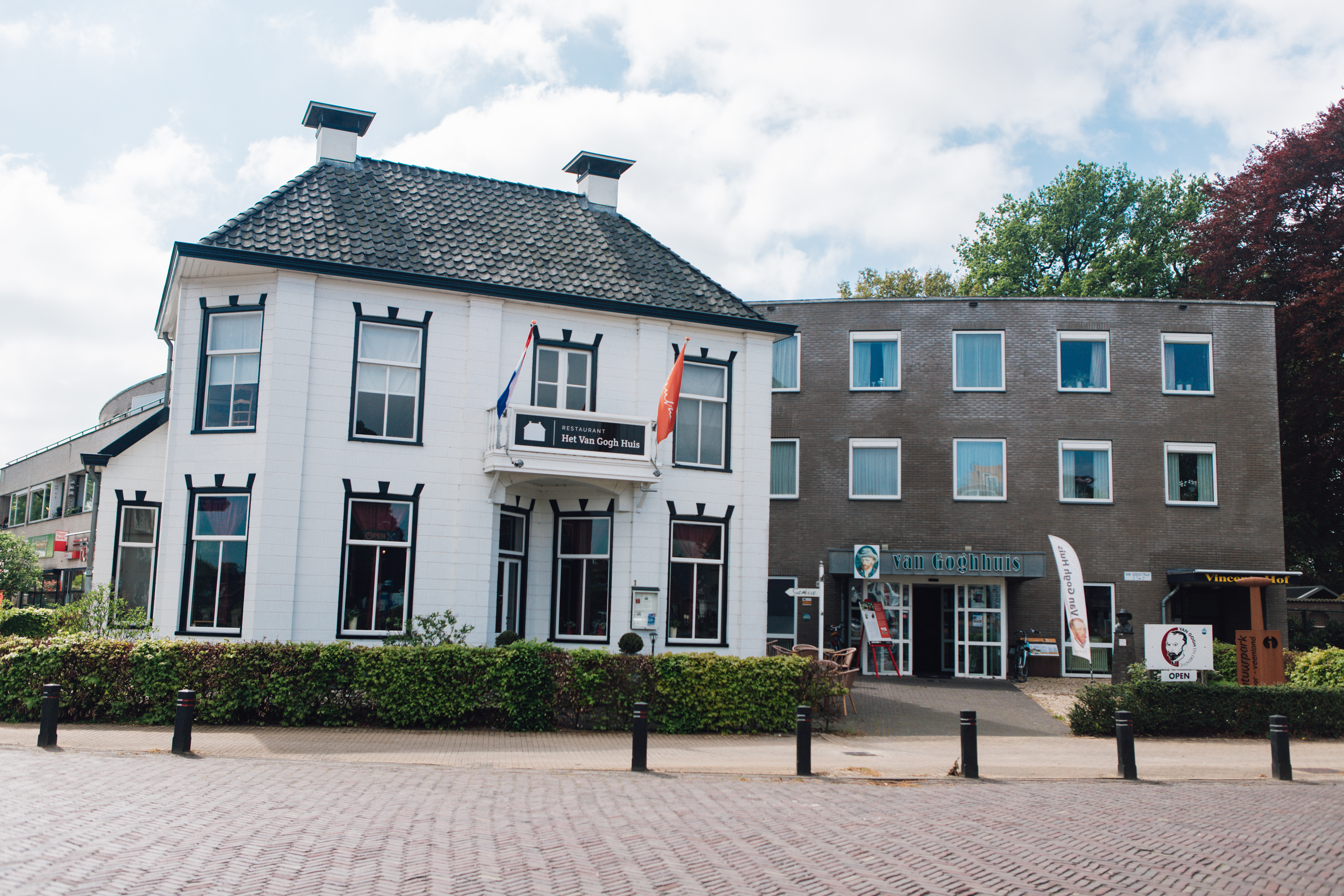
Scholte Inn where Vincent van Gogh stayed

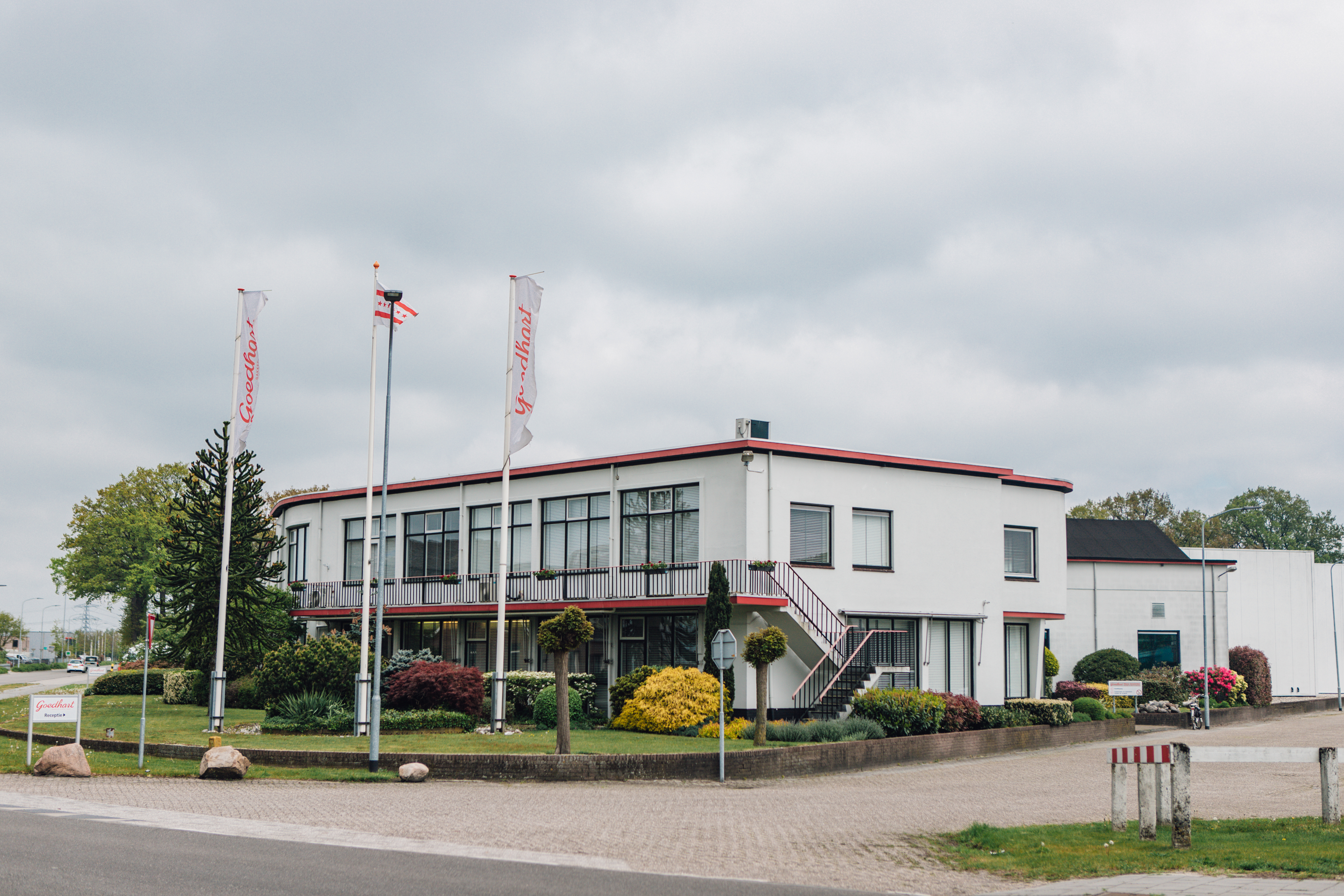
Bakery in Veenoord

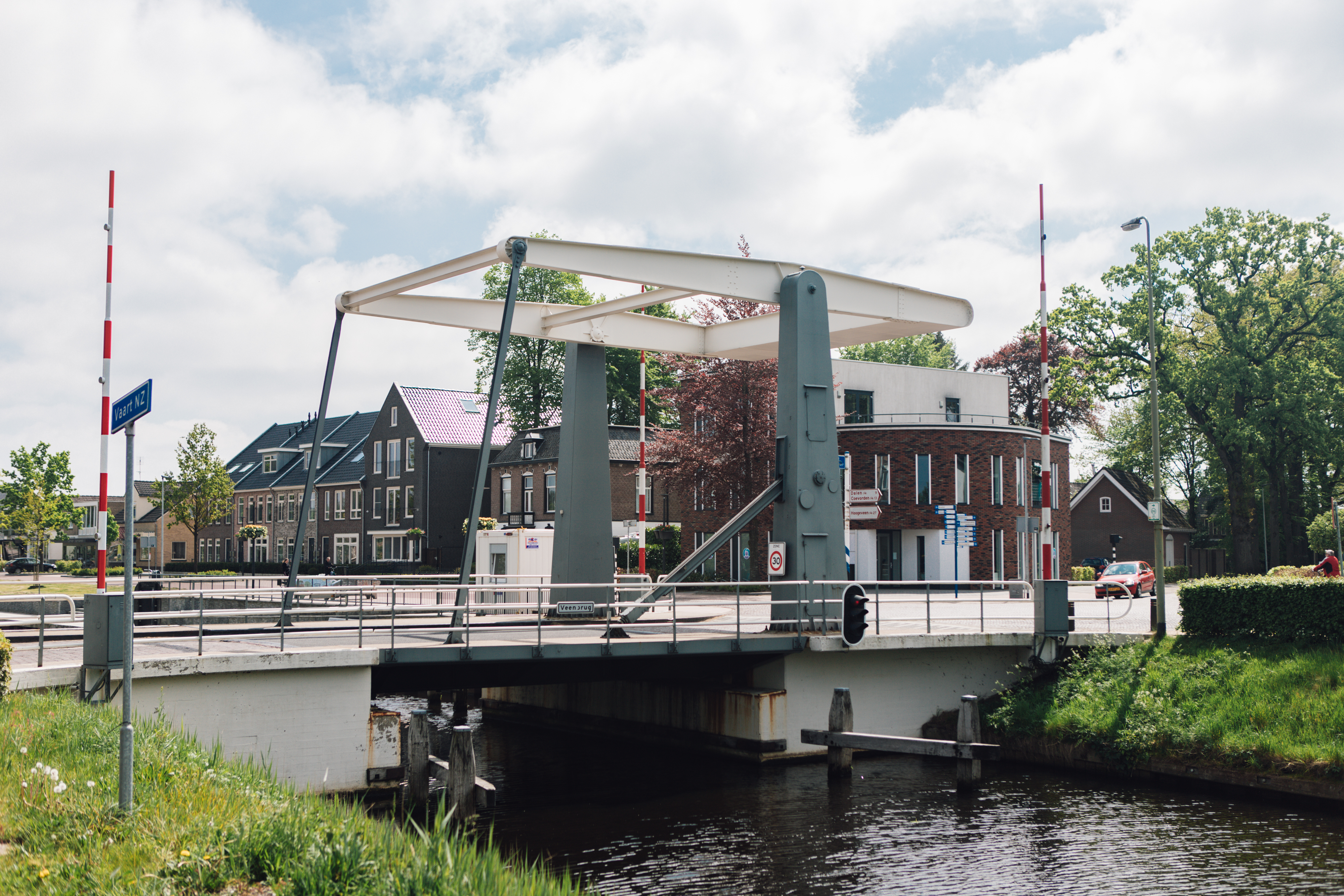
Draw bridge in Veenoord
