= Gerrit Claesz Bleker =

Dutch Golden Age painter (1592–1656)

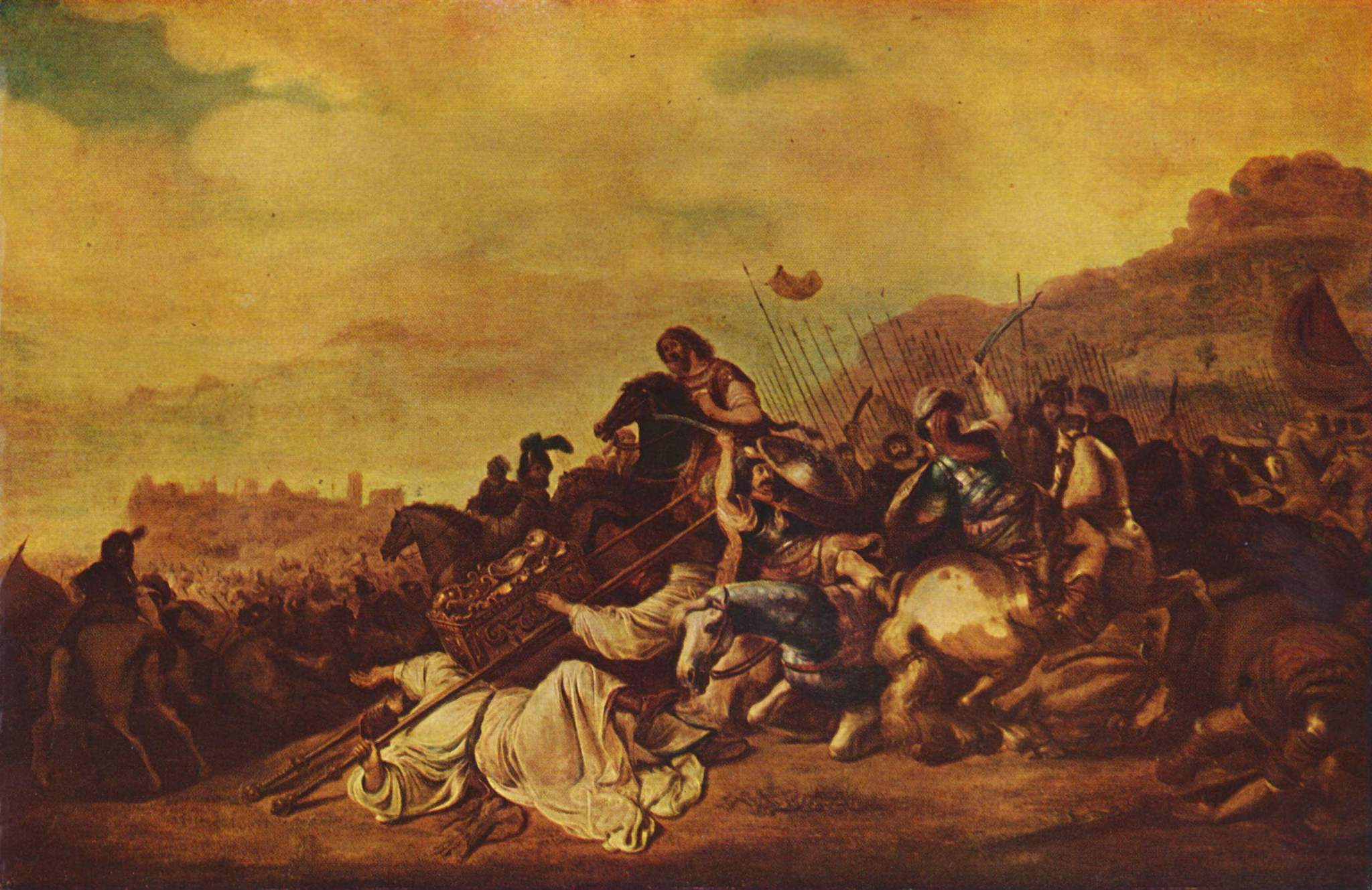
The Holy Ark falling in the hands of the Philistines, 1640

Gerrit Claesz Bleker (1592, in Haarlem – February 8, 1656, in Haarlem), was a Dutch Golden Age painter.

According to Houbraken in 1718, who repeated a list of names from Theodorus Schrevelius's 1648 book on Haarlem called Harlemias, he was a good landscape painter of Haarlem along with Cornelis Vroom, son of Hendrick Cornelisz Vroom, "Joh. Jakobsz.", who was in Italy for many years, "Nicol. Zuyker", Salomon van Ruysdael, and Reyer van Blommendael.

According to the RKD he was a landscape painter of historical allegories who became a member of the Haarlem Guild of St. Luke sometime before 1643 and who later became the teacher of Dirck Bleker (possibly his son), Pieter Adelaar, David Decker, and Paulus van der Goes. He was probably the pupil of Nicolaes Moeyaert.
