= Lars Bleker =

German footballer

Personal information
- Date of birth: 28 June 1994 (age 32)
- Place of birth: Stadtlohn, Germany
- Height: 1.77 m (5 ft 10 in)
- Positions: Midfielder; right-back

Youth career
- –2007: RC Borken-Hoxfeld
- 2007–2009: Schalke 04
- 2009–2013: FC Twente

Senior career*
Years	Team	Apps	(Gls)
2013–2015	FC Twente II	41	(0)
2015–2017	VfL Osnabrück	10	(0)
2015–2017	VfL Osnabrück II	20	(0)
2017	SC Wiedenbrück	0	(0)
2017–2022	1. FC Bocholt	121	(2)
2023–2024	SpVgg Vreden	22	(0)
- * Club domestic league appearances and goals as of 03:28, 4 July 2024 (UTC)

Lars Bleker (born 28 June 1994) is a German professional footballer who most recently played as a midfielder or right-back for SpVgg Vreden.
