= 2026–27 VVV-Venlo season =

VVV-Venlo
2026–27 season
- Chairman: Jeroen Oehlen
- Head coach: Marinus Dijkhuizen
- Stadium: Seacon Stadion – De Koel –
colours	colours
- All statistics correct as of 23 august 2026.

The 2026–27 season is VVV-Venlo's 38th season in the Eerste Divisie (1st consecutive).

The club will also competed in the KNVB Cup this season.

== Players ==
=== First-team squad ===
As of 14 November 2026

Note: Flags indicate national team as defined under FIFA eligibility rules; some limited exceptions apply. Players may hold more than one non-FIFA nationality.

No.	Pos.	Nation	Player
1	GK	CUW	Trevor Doornbusch
3	MF	NED	Luuk Verheij
4	DF	IRL	Éanna Clancy
5	DF	NED	Lars de Blok
6	MF	BEL	Andreas Verstraeten
7	FW	ALG	Edhy Zuliani
8	MF	MAR	Ismail Oulad M'Hand
9	FW	NED	Dean Zandbergen
9	FW	GRE	Mattheos Tsigkas
10	MF	NED	Alex Schalk
11	MF	MAR	Nassim Ait Mouhou
13	GK	NED	Youri Schoonderwaldt
14	MF	NED	Raf Vullers
15	DF	NED	Tijn Joosten

No.	Pos.	Nation	Player
16	DF	GER	Philip Heise
17	DF	GER	Gino Schmidt
19	FW	NED	Thomas Janssen
21	DF	GER	Luis Görlich
22	GK	GER	Zidane Taylan
24	MF	NED	Mohammed Odriss
31	DF	BEL	Michael Davis
33	DF	FRA	Gabin Blancquart
34	FW	NED	Amir Rais
35	MF	NED	Yousri El Anbri
38	MF	NED	Tristan Schenkhuizen
43	FW	NED	Devy Hendrikx
47	FW	NED	Maarten van Grootel

== Transfers ==
=== In ===
Pos.	Player	Transferred from	Fee	Date
FW	(Netherlands) Alex Schalk	No club		1 July 2026
FW	(Algeria) Edhy Zuliani	(France) Toulouse FC		1 July 2026
DF	(Germany) Luis Görlich	(Germany) SSV Ulm 1846		1 July 2026
MF	(Netherlands) Tristan Schenkhuizen	(Netherlands) Fortuna Sittard	Free	1 July 2026
DF	(Republic of Ireland) Éanna Clancy	(Republic of Ireland) UCD		23 July 2026
MF	(Morocco) Ismail Oulad M'Hand	(Bosnia and Herzegovina) FK Željezničar Sarajevo	Free	25 august 2026
MF	(Netherlands) Amir Rais	(Belgium) Patro Eisden Maasmechelen		2 September 2026
MF	(Belgium) Andreas Verstraeten	(Belgium) Royal Antwerp FC	On loan	2 September 2026
FW	(Greece) Mattheos Tsigkas	(Germany) VfB Stuttgart II	On loan	2 September 2026

=== Out ===
Pos.	Player	Transferred to	Fee	Date
FW	(Netherlands) Diego van Oorschot	(Netherlands) Heracles Almelo	End of loan	30 June 2026
MF	(Netherlands) Jorn Triep	(Netherlands) Jong Sparta Rotterdam	End of loan	30 June 2026
FW	(Netherlands) Layee Kromah	(Netherlands) Jong Sparta Rotterdam	End of loan	30 June 2026
DF	(Netherlands) Yousri Sbai	(Netherlands) NEC Nijmegen	End of loan	30 June 2026
MF	(Morocco) Driess Saddiki	No club		1 July 2026
DF	(Curaçao) Dylan Timber	(Netherlands) MVV Maastricht	Free	1 July 2026
MF	(Netherlands) Joep Kluskens	(Kosovo) KF Llapi	Free	1 July 2026
FW	(Germany) Lasse Wehmeyer	(Denmark) Middelfart Boldklub	Free	1 July 2026
FW	(Netherlands) Bjorn van Zijl	(Netherlands) De Graafschap	€500,000	2 July 2026
DF	(Netherlands) Luuk Verheij	(Netherlands) Roda JC Kerkrade		2 July 2026
FW	(Netherlands) Youssef Mephtah	(Belgium) Esperanza Pelt	Free	29 July 2026
FW	(Netherlands) Navarone Foor	(Indonesia) PSM Makassar	Free	1 August 2026
DF	(Netherlands) Thomas Reinders	No club		4 August 2026
MF	(Netherlands) Joshua Eijgenraam	No club		5 August 2026
DF	(Netherlands) Diego van Zutphen	(Netherlands) Helmond Sport	Free	13 August 2026
MF	(Netherlands) Naïm Matoug	(Netherlands) MVV Maastricht	Free	27 August 2026
DF	(Netherlands) Luuk Verheij	(Netherlands) Roda JC Kerkrade		2 September 2026

== Competitions ==
=== Overall record ===
Competition	First match	Last match	Starting round	Final position	Record							
Competition	First match	Last match	Starting round	Final position	Pld	W	D	L	GF	GA	GD	Win %
Eerste Divisie	7 August 2026		Week 1		15	9	2	4	38	24	+14	60.00
KNVB Cup	28 October 2026	28 October 2026	1st round	1st round	1	0	0	1	0	2	−2	0.00
Total					16	9	2	5	38	26	+12	56.25

Source: ESPN

=== Eredivisie ===
==== League table ====
Pos	Team	Pld	W	D	L	GF	GA	GD	Pts	Promotion or qualification
1	Heracles Almelo (Note: Winner of the First Period (Rounds 1–10)) (X)	15	12	2	1	46	16	+30	38	Promotion to the Eredivisie
2	Almere City	15	10	1	4	36	15	+21	31	Promotion to the Eredivisie
3	VVV-Venlo	15	9	2	4	38	24	+14	29	Qualification for promotion play-offs
4	NAC Breda	15	8	4	3	29	22	+7	28	Qualification for promotion play-offs
5	Roda JC Kerkrade	15	8	4	3	21	18	+3	28	Qualification for promotion play-offs

Updated to match(es) played on 15 November 2026. Source: Flashscore, Keuken Kampioen Divisie (in Dutch)
Rules for classification: Season in progress: 1) Most points won; 2) Less points lost; 3) Goal difference; 4) Goals scored; 5) Head-to-head points; 6) Head-to-head goal difference; 7) Head-to-head goals scored 8) Head-to-head away goals scored 9) Alphabetical order; End of season: 1) Points; 2) Goal difference; 3) Goals scored; 4) Head-to-head points; 5) Head-to-head goal difference; 6) Head-to-head goals scored 7) Head-to-head away goals scored; 8) Extra match or series of matches 9) Goal difference (series of matches) 10) Goals scored (series of matches) 11) Penalty shoot-out (extra match or series of matches)
(X) Assured of at least promotion play-offs

==== Results summary ====
Overall								Home						Away					
Pld	W	D	L	GF	GA	GD	Pts	W	D	L	GF	GA	GD	W	D	L	GF	GA	GD
15	9	2	4	38	24	+14	29	4	2	1	19	11	+8	5	0	3	19	13	+6

Last updated: 14 November 2026.
Source: Eerste Divisie

==== Results by round ====
Round	1	2	3	4	5	6	7	8	9	10	11	12	13	14	15	16	17	18	19	20	21	22	23	24	25	26	27	28	29	30	31	32	33	34	35	36	37	38
Ground	H	A	H	H	A	H	A	A	H	A	H	A	A	H	H																							
Result	L	W	W	W	L	W	W	L	W	W	D	W	W	D	L																							
Position			5	4		4	3	4	3	3			2	2	3																							

A = Away; H = Home; W = Win; D = Draw; L = Loss

=== Matches ===
==== 1st half ====
7 August 2026 1st week	VVV Venlo	3–4	Heracles Almelo	Venlo
20:00	Dean Zandbergen 78' 83'; Devy Hendrikx 86'	Report	Tristan van Gilst 38' (pen.); David Vicente 45'; Jean-Paul N'Djoli 71' 88'	Stadium: Seacon Stadion; Attendance: 6,309; Referee: Martin van den Kerkhof

14 August 2026 2nd week	NAC Breda	0–2	VVV Venlo	Breda
20:00		Report	Edhy Zuliani 4' 50'	Stadium: Rat Verlegh Stadion; Attendance: 19,230; Referee: Robin Hensgens

23 August 2026 3rd week	VVV Venlo	2–1	De Graafschap	Venlo
16:45	Nassim Ait Mouhou 42'; Raf Vullers 45+2'	Report	Julian Kania 10'	Stadium: Seacon Stadion; Attendance: 5,577; Referee: Martijn Vos

30 August 2026 4th week	VVV Venlo	4–0	FC Emmen	Venlo
16:45	Dean Zandbergen 16' 43'; Edhy Zuliani 63'; Luis Görlich 90+2'	Report		Stadium: Seacon Stadion; Attendance: 5,034; Referee: Clay Ruperti

4 September 2026 5th week	Helmond Sport	4–2	VVV Venlo	Helmond
20:00	Livio Cicero 17'; Labinot Bajrami 44'; Mauro Lenaerts 85' 90+1'	Report	Éanna Clancy 47'; Lars de Blok 69' (pen.)	Stadium: GS Staalwerken Stadion; Attendance: 2,057; Referee: Laurens Gerrets

11 September 2026 6th week	VVV Venlo	3–1	TOP Oss	Venlo
20:00	Delano Vianello 26' (o.g.); Mattheos Tsigkas 31'; Mohammed Odriss 79'	Report	Franslyn Nsingi 40'	Stadium: Seacon Stadion; Attendance: 4,686; Referee: Thomas Hardeman

18 September 2026 7th week	Jong FC Utrecht	1–3	VVV Venlo	Utrecht
20:00	Jamie Schuldes 38'	Report	Nassim Ait Mouhou 14' 53'; Tristan Schenkhuizen 18'	Stadium: Sportcomplex Zoudenbalch; Attendance: 624; Referee: Niels Boel

26 September 2026 8th week	FC Volendam	3–2	VVV Venlo	Volendam
20:00	Henk Veerman 5'; Younes el Meftahi 7'; Reuven Niemeijer 38'	Report	Éanna Clancy 16'; Gino Schmidt 81'	Stadium: Kras Stadion; Attendance: 6,055; Referee: Stan Teuben

4 October 2026 9th week	VVV Venlo	2–0	Roda JC Kerkrade	Venlo
14:30	Gino Schmidt 53'; Amir Rais 90+1'	Report		Stadium: Seacon Stadion; Attendance: 8,000; Referee: Wouter Wiersma

9 October 2026 10th week	Jong Ajax	0–3	VVV Venlo	Duivendrecht, Amsterdam
20:00		Report	Edhy Zuliani 4'; Gino Schmidt 58'; Philip Heise 65' (pen.)	Stadium: Sportpark De Toekomst; Attendance: 1,060; Referee: Martin Pérez

16 October 2026 11th week	VVV Venlo	4–4	Jong AZ	Venlo
20:00	Gino Schmidt 33' 49'; Andreas Verstraeten 66'; Éanna Clancy 70'	Report	Jerolldino Bergraaf 13'; Rio Robbemond 22'; Jasper Hartog 55' 90+3'	Stadium: Seacon Stadion; Attendance: 4,828; Referee: Thomas Hardeman

24 October 2026 12th week	FC Dordrecht	2–4	VVV Venlo	Dordrecht
16:30	Lorenzo Riccio 56'; Rochanio Lenz 90+3'	Report	Thomas Janssen 8'; Éanna Clancy 17'; Ismail Oulad M'Hand 33'; Lars de Blok 50'	Stadium: Stadion Krommedijk; Attendance: 2,500; Referee: Stan Teuben

31 October 2026 13th week	MVV Maastricht	1–2	VVV Venlo	Maastricht
16:30	Lennerd Daneels 52' (pen.)	Report	Mattheos Tsigkas 39'; Éanna Clancy 45+3'	Stadium: De Geusselt; Attendance: 4,616; Referee: Jannick van der Laan

6 November 2026 14th week	VVV Venlo	1–1	Jong PSV	Venlo
20:00	Ismail Oulad M'Hand 66'	Report	Amir Bouhamdi 39'	Stadium: Seacon Stadion; Attendance: 5,506; Referee: Martin Pérez

14 November 2026 15th week	VVV Venlo	1–2	FC Eindhoven	Venlo
20:00	Devy Hendrix 87'	Report	Niek Munsters 25'; Antonio Baždarić 90+4'	Stadium: Seacon Stadion; Attendance: 4,542; Referee: Jorg Ordelmans

=== KNVB Cup ===
28 October 2026 1st round	VVV Venlo	0–2	SBV Vitesse	Venlo
20:00		Report	Eduard Probst 31'; Naoufal Bannis 45' (pen.)	Stadium: Seacon Stadion; Attendance: 4.782; Referee: Ingmar Oostrom

== Statistics ==
=== Scorers ===
#	Player	Eerste Divisie
1	(Republic of Ireland) Éanna Clancy	5
1	(Germany) Gino Schmidt	5
3	(Netherlands) Dean Zandbergen	4
3	(Algeria) Edhy Zuliani	4
5	(Morocco) Nassim Ait Mouhou	3
6	(Netherlands) Devy Hendrikx	2
6	(Morocco) Ismail Oulad M'Hand	2
6	(Netherlands) Lars de Blok	2
6	(Greece) Mattheos Tsigkas	2
10	(Netherlands) Amir Rais	1
10	(Belgium) Andreas Verstraeten	1
10	(Germany) Luis Görlich	1
10	(Netherlands) Mohammed Odriss	1
10	(Germany) Philip Heise	1
10	(Netherlands) Raf Vullers	1
10	(Netherlands) Thomas Janssen	1
10	(Netherlands) Tristan Schenkhuizen	1

=== Appearances ===
#	Player	Eerste Divisie	KNVB	Total
1	(Netherlands) Raf Vullers	15	1	16
2	(Republic of Ireland) Éanna Clancy	15	0	15
2	(Netherlands) Youri Schoonderwaldt	15	0	15
2	(France) Gabin Blancquart	14	1	15
5	(Netherlands) Lars de Blok	13	1	14
5	(Netherlands) Mohammed Odriss	13	1	14
5	(Netherlands) Thomas Janssen	13	1	14
5	(Netherlands) Tristan Schenkhuizen	13	1	14
9	(Algeria) Edhy Zuliani	13	0	13
9	(Morocco) Nassim Ait Mouhou	12	1	13
11	(Morocco) Ismail Oulad M'Hand	11	1	12
11	(Greece) Mattheos Tsigkas	11	1	12
13	(Belgium) Andreas Verstraeten	10	1	11
14	(Germany) Gino Schmidt	9	1	10
14	(Germany) Luis Görlich	9	1	10
16	(Netherlands) Amir Rais	8	1	9
17	(Germany) Philip Heise	8	0	8
17	(Netherlands) Tijn Joosten	7	1	8
19	(Netherlands) Devy Hendrikx	6	1	7
20	(Netherlands) Alex Schalk	4	0	4
20	(Netherlands) Dean Zandbergen	4	0	4
20	(Belgium) Michael Davis	4	0	4
23	(Netherlands) Yousri El Anbri	3	0	3
24	(Netherlands) Luuk Verheij	1	0	1
24	(Netherlands) Maarten van Grootel	1	0	1
24	(Curaçao) Trevor Doornbusch	0	1	1

=== Clean sheets ===
#	Player	Eerste Divisie
1	(Netherlands) Youri Schoonderwaldt	4

=== Disciplinary record ===
#	Player	Eerste Divisie		KNVB		Total	
#	Player	Yellow card	Red card	Yellow card	Red card	Yellow card	Red card
1	(Netherlands) Mohammed Odriss	2	0	0	1	2	1
2	(Morocco) Ismail Oulad M'Hand	5	0	0	0	5	0
2	(Germany) Luis Görlich	4	0	1	0	5	0
4	(Algeria) Edhy Zuliani	4	0	0	0	4	0
5	(Netherlands) Lars de Blok	2	0	1	0	3	0
5	(Republic of Ireland) Éanna Clancy	2	0	0	0	2	0
5	(Morocco) Nassim Ait Mouhou	1	0	1	0	2	0
5	(Netherlands) Raf Vullers	2	0	0	0	2	0
9	(Netherlands) Alex Schalk	1	0	0	0	1	0
9	(Belgium) Andreas Verstraeten	1	0	0	0	1	0
9	(Netherlands) Devy Hendrikx	1	0	0	0	1	0
9	(France) Gabin Blancquart	0	0	1	0	1	0
9	(Germany) Philip Heise	1	0	0	0	1	0
9	(Netherlands) Thomas Janssen	1	0	0	0	1	0
9	(Netherlands) Youri Schoonderwaldt	1	0	0	0	1	0
9	(Netherlands) Yousri El Anbri	1	0	0	0	1	0
