= 2025–26 VVV-Venlo season =

VVV-Venlo
2025–26 season
- Stadium: Seacon Stadion – De Koel –
- Eerste Divisie: 13th
- KNVB Cup: 1st round
- Top goalscorer: League: Dean Zandbergen (15 goals); All: Dean Zandbergen (15 goals)
- Highest home attendance: 6,083 (21st week)
- Lowest home attendance: 3,802 (12th week)
- Average home league attendance: 4,906
- Biggest win: 4-0 FC Emmen (h) 11th week
- Biggest defeat: 3-0 (Almere City FC (a) 17th week ADO Den Haag (h) 18th week RKC Waalwijk (h) 30th week SC Heerenveen (h) KNVB 1st round)
- All statistics correct as of 24 April 2026.

The 2025–26 season was the 123rd season of VVV-Venlo since the club's formation. It was also their 42nd season in the Eerste Divisie and their fifth successive campaign in the second tier of Dutch football.

Alongside their league campaign, VVV-Venlo competed in the KNVB Cup. The club was knocked out in the first round following a 3–0 defeat against SC Heerenveen.

VVV-Venlo completed the Eerste Divisie season in 13th place.

With 15 league goals, Dean Zandbergen finished as VVV-Venlo's top goalscorer in the Eerste Divisie.

Youri Schoonderwaldt featured more often than any other VVV-Venlo player during the campaign, making 39 appearances in all competitions. He played 38 matches in the Eerste Divisie and appeared once in the KNVB Cup.

== Players ==
=== First-team squad ===
As of 12 January 2026

Note: Flags indicate national team as defined under FIFA eligibility rules; some limited exceptions apply. Players may hold more than one non-FIFA nationality.

| No. | Pos. | Nation | Player |
|---|---|---|---|
| 2 | DF | NED | Sylian Mokono |
| 3 | MF | NED | Luuk Verheij |
| 4 | DF | NED | Dylan Timber |
| 5 | DF | NED | Lars de Blok |
| 6 | MF | NED | Joep Kluskens |
| 7 | MF | GER | Lasse Wehmeyer |
| 8 | FW | NED | Diego van Oorschot |
| 8 | MF | NED | Tim Braem |
| 9 | FW | NED | Dean Zandbergen |
| 10 | MF | NED | Jorn Triep |
| 11 | MF | NED | Nassim Ait Mouhou |
| 13 | GK | NED | Youri Schoonderwaldt |
| 14 | DF | NED | Thomas Reinders |
| 15 | DF | NED | Tijn Joosten |
| 16 | DF | GER | Philip Heise |

| No. | Pos. | Nation | Player |
|---|---|---|---|
| 17 | MF | MAR | Driess Saddiki |
| 18 | FW | NED | Bjorn van Zijl |
| 20 | MF | NED | Joshua Eijgenraam |
| 23 | MF | NED | Yousri Sbai |
| 24 | MF | NED | Mohammed Odriss |
| 25 | MF | NED | Navarone Foor |
| 26 | FW | NED | Naïm Matoug |
| 27 | FW | NED | Layee Kromah |
| 31 | DF | BEL | Michael Davis |
| 33 | DF | FRA | Gabin Blancquart |
| 35 | MF | NED | Yousri El Anbri |
| 37 | DF | NED | Diego van Zutphen |
| 41 | FW | BEL | Evangelos Soferis |
| 42 | MF | NED | Raf Vullers |
| 45 | FW | NED | Thomas Janssen |

== Transfers ==
=== In ===
| Pos. | Player | Transferred from | Fee | Date |
|---|---|---|---|---|
| FW | (Netherlands) Jorn Triep | (Netherlands) Jong Sparta Rotterdam | On loan | 1 July 2025 |
| MF | (Netherlands) Joshua Eijgenraam | (Netherlands) Excelsior Rotterdam | Free | 1 July 2025 |
| DF | (Netherlands) Luuk Verheij | (Netherlands) FC Eindhoven | Free | 1 July 2025 |
| DF | (Belgium) Michael Davis | (Belgium) Royal Antwerp FC | Free | 1 July 2025 |
| FW | (Morocco) Nassim Ait Mouhou | (France) RC Lens B | Free | 1 July 2025 |
| GK | (Netherlands) Youri Schoonderwaldt | (Netherlands) Sparta Rotterdam | On loan | 1 July 2025 |
| DF | (Netherlands) Thomas Reinders | (Netherlands) NEC Nijmegen | Free | 17 July 2025 |
| DF | (Netherlands) Lars de Blok | (Netherlands) Feyenoord U21 | Free | 24 July 2025 |
| DF | (Germany) Philip Heise | (Germany) Dynamo Dresden | Free | 1 August 2025 |
| FW | (Netherlands) Diego van Oorschot | (Netherlands) Heracles Almelo | On loan | 2 September 2025 |
| DF | (Netherlands) Yousri Sbai | (Netherlands) NEC Nijmegen | On loan | 12 January 2026 |

=== Out ===
| Pos. | Player | Transferred to | Fee | Date |
|---|---|---|---|---|
| MF | (Netherlands) Max de Waal | (Netherlands) Willem II Tilburg | End of loan | 30 June 2025 |
| DF | (Netherlands) Serano Seymor | (Netherlands) Excelsior Rotterdam | End of loan | 30 June 2025 |
| FW | (Netherlands) Brahim Darri | (United Arab Emirates) Palm City FC | Free | 1 July 2025 |
| GK | (Netherlands) Delano van Crooij | No club | | 1 July 2025 |
| MF | (Belgium) Elias Sierra | No club | | 1 July 2025 |
| FW | (Netherlands) Martijn Berden | No club | | 1 July 2025 |
| DF | (Netherlands) Rick Ketting | (Cambodia) Phnom Penh Crown FC | Free | 1 July 2025 |
| DF | (Netherlands) Robin Lathouwers | No club | | 1 July 2025 |
| DF | (Netherlands) Roel Janssen | End of career | | 1 July 2025 |
| FW | (Netherlands) Sam Sow | (Netherlands) GVVV | Free | 1 July 2025 |
| FW | (Netherlands) Thijme Verheijen | (Netherlands) MVV Maastricht | | 1 July 2025 |
| DF | (Netherlands) Simon Janssen | (Netherlands) Excelsior Rotterdam | Free | 1 September 2025 |
| MF | (Netherlands) Tim Braem | (Netherlands) De Graafschap | €150,000 | 2 September 2025 |
| DF | (Netherlands) Sylian Mokono | (Kosovo) FC Prishtina | Free | 14 January 2026 |
| FW | (Belgium) Evangelos Soferis | (Belgium) Bocholt VV | | 27 January 2026 |

== Competitions ==
=== Overall record ===
| Competition | First match | Last match | Starting round | Final position | Record | | | | | | | |
| Competition | First match | Last match | Starting round | Final position | Pld | W | D | L | GF | GA | GD | Win % |
|---|---|---|---|---|---|---|---|---|---|---|---|---|
| Eerste Divisie | 8 August 2025 | 24 April 2025 | Week 1 | 13th | 38 | 13 | 6 | 19 | 50 | 58 | −8 | 34.21 |
| KNVB Cup | 28 October 2025 | 28 October 2025 | 1st round | 1st round | 1 | 0 | 0 | 1 | 0 | 3 | −3 | 0.00 |
| Total | | | | | 39 | 13 | 6 | 20 | 50 | 61 | −11 | 33.33 |

Last updated: 24 April 2026
Source: ESPN

=== Eerste Divisie ===
==== League table ====
| Pos | Team | Pld | W | D | L | GF | GA | GD | Pts | Promotion or qualification |
|---|---|---|---|---|---|---|---|---|---|---|
| 11 | Eindhoven | 38 | 14 | 5 | 19 | 51 | 69 | −18 | 47 | |
| 12 | Jong FC Utrecht | 38 | 12 | 10 | 16 | 58 | 62 | −4 | 46 | Reserve teams are not eligible to be promoted to the Eredivisie |
| 13 | VVV-Venlo | 38 | 13 | 6 | 19 | 50 | 58 | −8 | 45 | |
| 14 | Emmen | 38 | 12 | 9 | 17 | 58 | 72 | −14 | 45 | |
| 15 | Vitesse (Note: In the previous season, Vitesse were deducted 3 points for withholding information, another 3 points due to late submission of required information, and another 6 due to previous administrative shortcomings. Vitesse appealed the decisions of the deductions of these 12 points, and due to the decision of the rejection of the appeal coming after the end of the season, the penalty was instead moved to next season.) | 38 | 15 | 11 | 12 | 64 | 55 | +9 | 44 | |

Source: Flashscore, Keuken Kampioen Divisie (in Dutch)
Rules for classification: Season in progress: 1) Most points won; 2) Less points lost; 3) Goal difference; 4) Goals scored; 5) Head-to-head points; 6) Head-to-head goal difference; 7) Head-to-head goals scored 8) Head-to-head away goals scored 9) Alphabetical order; End of season: 1) Points; 2) Goal difference; 3) Goals scored; 4) Head-to-head points; 5) Head-to-head goal difference; 6) Head-to-head goals scored 7) Head-to-head away goals scored; 8) Extra match or series of matches 9) Goal difference (series of matches) 10) Goals scored (series of matches) 11) Penalty shoot-out (extra match or series of matches)

==== Results summary ====
| Overall | | | | | | | | Home | | | | | | Away | | | | | |
| Pld | W | D | L | GF | GA | GD | Pts | W | D | L | GF | GA | GD | W | D | L | GF | GA | GD |
|---|---|---|---|---|---|---|---|---|---|---|---|---|---|---|---|---|---|---|---|
| 38 | 13 | 6 | 19 | 50 | 58 | −8 | 45 | 8 | 2 | 9 | 26 | 26 | 0 | 5 | 4 | 10 | 24 | 32 | −8 |

Last updated: 24 April 2026.
Source: https://www.espn.nl/voetbal/team/scorebord/_/id/3731/season/2025/

==== Results by round ====
| Round | 1 | 2 | 3 | 4 | 5 | 6 | 7 | 8 | 9 | 10 | 11 | 12 | 13 | 14 | 15 | 16 | 17 | 18 | 19 | 20 | 21 | 22 | 23 | 24 | 25 | 26 | 27 | 28 | 29 | 30 | 31 | 32 | 33 | 34 | 35 | 36 | 37 | 38 |
|---|---|---|---|---|---|---|---|---|---|---|---|---|---|---|---|---|---|---|---|---|---|---|---|---|---|---|---|---|---|---|---|---|---|---|---|---|---|---|
| Ground | A | H | H | A | H | A | H | A | H | A | H | H | A | H | A | H | A | H | A | A | H | H | A | A | A | H | A | H | A | H | A | H | A | H | A | H | A | H |
| Result | L | L | W | L | W | L | W | W | L | L | W | L | W | L | W | L | L | L | W | W | W | L | L | D | D | W | D | D | L | L | L | L | D | W | L | D | L | W |
| Position | | | | | | | | | | | | | | | | | | | | | | | | | | | | | | | | | | | | | | 13 |

A = Away; H = Home; W = Win; D = Draw; L = Loss

=== Matches ===
==== 1st half ====
| 8 August 2025 1st week | De Graafschap | 3–2 | VVV-Venlo | Doetinchem |
| 20:00 | Dimitris Theodoridis 13'; Othniël Raterink 25'; Milan Smits 57' | Report | Navarone Foor 17'; Nassim Ait Mouhou 78' | Stadium: De Vijverberg; Attendance: 10,125; Referee: Martijn Vos |

| 15 August 2025 2nd week | VVV-Venlo | 0–2 | Jong PSV | Venlo |
| 20:00 | | Report | Robin van Duiven 32' (pen.); Nicolas Verkooijen 73' | Stadium: Covebo Stadium - De Koel; Attendance: 5,214; Referee: Martin Fernando Perezlindo |

| 24 August 2025 3rd week | VVV-Venlo | 3–1 | Roda JC Kerkrade | Venlo |
| 12:15 | Justin Treichel 21' (o.g.); Philip Heise 50'; Bjorn van Zijl 78' | Report | Anthony van der Hurk 58' (pen.) | Stadium: Covebo Stadium - De Koel; Attendance: 5,102; Referee: Jeroen Manschot |

| 31 August 2025 4th week | SC Cambuur | 3–1 | VVV-Venlo | Leeuwarden |
| 16:45 | Oscar Sjöstrand 15'; Tony Rölke 32'; Ismaël Baouf 53' | Report | Gabin Blancquart 64' | Stadium: Kooi Stadium; Attendance: 12,473; Referee: Martin van den Kerkhof |

| 13 september 2025 5th week | VVV-Venlo | 2–1 | Helmond Sport | Venlo |
| 16:30 | Jorn Triep 41'; Nassim Ait Mouhou 62' | Report | Labinot Bajrami 86' | Stadium: Covebo Stadium - De Koel; Attendance: 4,469; Referee: Ingmar Oostrom |

| 16 September 2025 6th week | TOP Oss | 2–1 | VVV-Venlo | Oss |
| 20:00 | Mauresmo Hinoke 40'; Tijmen Wildeboer 58' (pen.) | Report | Jorn Triep 66' | Stadium: Frans Heesen Stadion; Attendance: 1,715; Referee: Kevin Puts |

| 21 September 2025 7th week | VVV-Venlo | 1–0 | MVV Maastricht | Venlo |
| 16:30 | Sylian Mokono 90+1' | Report | | Stadium: Covebo Stadium - De Koel; Attendance: 4,570; Referee: Wouter Wiersma |

| 26 September 2025 8th week | Jong Ajax | 2–4 | VVV-Venlo | Duivendrecht |
| 20:00 | Emre Ünüvar 18'; Don O'Niel 66' | Report | Naïm Matoug 10'; Bjorn van Zijl 46'; Jorn Triep 52'; Gabin Blancquart 79' | Stadium: De Toekomst; Attendance: 970; Referee: Niels Boel |

| 30 September 2025 9th week | VVV-Venlo | 0–1 | FC Den Bosch | Venlo |
| 20:00 | | Report | Kévin Monzialo 76' | Stadium: Covebo Stadium - De Koel; Attendance: 4,004; Referee: Robin Hensgens |

| 3 October 2025 10th week | FC Dordrecht | 2–0 | VVV-Venlo | Dordrecht |
| 20:00 | Lucas Woudenberg 59'; Joep van der Sluijs 74' | Report | | Stadium: Stadion Krommedijk; Attendance: 2,805; Referee: Rob Dieperink |

| 17 October 2025 11th week | VVV-Venlo | 4–0 | FC Emmen | Venlo |
| 20:00 | Nassim Ait Mouhou 49'; Luuk Verheij 58'; Bjorn van Zijl 71' 85' | Report | | Stadium: Covebo Stadium - De Koel; Attendance: 4,611; Referee: Erwin Blank |

| 21 October 2025 12th week | VVV-Venlo | 0–1 | Jong FC Utrecht | Venlo |
| 20:00 | | Report | Noah Ohio 8' (pen.) | Stadium: Covebo Stadium - De Koel; Attendance: 3,802; Referee: Niels Boel |

| 24 October 2025 13th week | FC Eindhoven | 0–1 | VVV-Venlo | Eindhoven |
| 20:00 | | Report | Lasse Wehmeyer 74' | Stadium: Jan Louwers Stadion; Attendance: 2,706; Referee: Ton van der Velden |

| 31 October 2025 14th week | VVV-Venlo | 1–2 | SBV Vitesse | Venlo |
| 20:00 | Gabin Blancquart 89' | Report | Dillion Hoogerwerf 35'; Elias Huth 60' | Stadium: Covebo Stadium - De Koel; Attendance: 5,141; Referee: Wouter Wiersma |

| 7 November 2025 15th week | Jong AZ | 0–2 | VVV-Venlo | The Hague |
| 20:00 | | Report | Lars de Blok 3' 90+1' | Stadium: AFAS Trainingscomplex; Attendance: 350; Referee: Boyd van Kommer |

| 21 November 2025 16th week | VVV-Venlo | 0–2 | Willem II Tilburg | Venlo |
| 20:00 | | Report | Devin Haen 1' 53' | Stadium: Covebo Stadium - De Koel; Attendance: 5,204; Referee: Ingmar Oostrom |

| 24 November 2025 17th week | Almere City FC | 3–0 | VVV-Venlo | Almere |
| 20:00 | Julian Rijkhoff 12'; Emanuel Poku 29' 78' | Report | | Stadium: Yanmar Stadion; Attendance: 3,188; Referee: Laurens Gerrets |

| 28 November 2025 18th week | VVV-Venlo | 0–3 | ADO Den Haag | Venlo |
| 20:00 | | Report | Jari Vlak 32'; Evan Rottier 51'; Jesse Bal 88' | Stadium: Covebo Stadium - De Koel; Attendance: 4,782; Referee: Alex Bos |

| 5 December 2025 19th week | RKC Waalwijk | 1–2 | VVV-Venlo | Waalwijk |
| 20:00 | Jesper Uneken 89' | Report | Joshua Eijgenraam 56'; Bjorn van Zijl 90+3' | Stadium: Mandemakers Stadion; Attendance: 3,482; Referee: Richard Martens |

| 12 December 2025 20th week | FC Den Bosch | 0–1 | VVV-Venlo | 's-Hertogenbosch |
| 20:00 | | Report | Layee Kromah 90+3' | Stadium: De Vliert; Attendance: 6,150; Referee: Tom Stevens |

| 19 December 2025 21st week | VVV-Venlo | 3–1 | FC Dordrecht | Venlo |
| 20:00 | Dean Zandbergen 21' 29' 33' | Report | Yannick Eduardo 61' | Stadium: Covebo Stadium - De Koel; Attendance: 6,083; Referee: Rick Sturm |

==== 2nd half ====
| 16 January 2026 22nd week | VVV-Venlo | 1–3 | Jong AZ | Venlo |
| 20:00 | Bjorn van Zijl 90+1' | Report | Ro-Zangelo Daal 29'; Yoël van den Ban 61' 71' | Stadium: Covebo Stadium - De Koel; Attendance: 4,618; Referee: Laurens Gerrets |

| 23 January 2026 23rd week | Willem II Tilburg | 2–1 | VVV-Venlo | Tilburg |
| 20:00 | Nick Doodeman 35'; Raffael Behounek 88' | Report | Dean Zandbergen 79' | Stadium: Koning Willem II Stadion; Attendance: 13,500; Referee: Arne de Beuckelaer |

| 26 January 2026 24th week | Roda JC Kerkrade | 2–2 | VVV-Venlo | Kerkrade |
| 20:00 | Joshua Nisbet 16'; Jack Cooper Love 35' | Report | Philip Heise 11' (pen.); Bjorn van Zijl 83' | Stadium: Parkstad Limburg Stadion; Attendance: 6,516; Referee: Richard Martens |

| 2 February 2026 25th week | Jong FC Utrecht | 2–2 | VVV-Venlo | Utrecht |
| 20:00 | Lars de Blok 48' (o.g.); Shedrach Ebite 89' | Report | Bjorn van Zijl 15'; Dean Zandbergen 78' | Stadium: Sportcomplex Zoudenbalch; Attendance: 343; Referee: Niels Boel |

| 7 February 2026 26th week | VVV-Venlo | 1–0 | FC Eindhoven | Venlo |
| 16:30 | Naïm Matoug 60' | Report | | Stadium: Covebo Stadium - De Koel; Attendance: 5,306; Referee: Kevin Puts |

| 14 February 2026 27th week | SBV Vitesse | 2–2 | VVV-Venlo | Arnhem |
| 16:30 | Joâo Arlete Pinto 24'; Elias Huth 87' | Report | Dean Zandbergen 55'; Nassim Ait Mouhou 82' | Stadium: GelreDome; Attendance: 17,975; Referee: Clay Ruperti |

| 20 February 2026 28th week | VVV-Venlo | 1–1 | TOP Oss | Venlo |
| 20:00 | Philip Heise 90+3' | Report | Tijmen Wildeboer 56' | Stadium: Covebo Stadium - De Koel; Attendance: 4,162; Referee: Thomas Hardeman |

| 27 February 2026 29th week | ADO Den Haag | 1–0 | VVV-Venlo | The Hague |
| 20:00 | Cameron Peupion 30' | Report | | Stadium: Bingoal Stadion; Attendance: 12,035; Referee: Marc Nagtegaal |

| 6 March 2026 30th week | VVV-Venlo | 0–3 | RKC Waalwijk | Venlo |
| 20:00 | | Report | Harrie Kuster 62'; Ryan Fage 67'; Tim van der Leij 76' | Stadium: Covebo Stadium - De Koel; Attendance: 4,861; Referee: Richard Martens |

| 13 March 2026 31st week | MVV Maastricht | 2–1 | VVV-Venlo | Maastricht |
| 20:00 | Sven Braken 56' (pen.); Stan Van Dessel 90+5' | Report | Bjorn van Zijl 85' | Stadium: De Geusselt; Attendance: 3,562; Referee: Stan Teuben |

| 17 March 2026 32nd week | VVV-Venlo | 0–1 | Jong Ajax | Venlo |
| 20:00 | | Report | David Kalokoh 67' | Stadium: Covebo Stadium - De Koel; Attendance: 4,314; Referee: Kevin Puts |

| 20 March 2026 33rd week | FC Emmen | 2–2 | VVV-Venlo | Emmen |
| 20:00 | Luuk Verheij 37' (o.g.); Freddy Quispel 41' | Report | Dean Zandbergen 62' 90+2' (pen.) | Stadium: De Oude Meerdijk; Attendance: 6,833; Referee: Martin Fernando Perezlindo |

| 3 April 2026 34th week | VVV-Venlo | 3–0 | SC Cambuur | Venlo |
| 20:00 | Dean Zandbergen 15' 80' 87' | Report | | Stadium: Covebo Stadium - De Koel; Attendance: 6,042; Referee: Martijn Vos |

| 6 April 2026 35th week | Jong PSV | 1–0 | VVV-Venlo | Eindhoven |
| 20:00 | Austyn Jones 52' | Report | | Stadium: De Herdgang; Attendance: 1,100; Referee: Shona Shukrula |

| 11 April 2026 36th week | VVV-Venlo | 3–3 | De Graafschap | Venlo |
| 20:00 | Lars de Blok 71'; Dean Zandbergen 90+3' 90+6' (pen.) | Report | Nathan Kaninda 38'; Nolan Martens 59'; Nils Eggens 87' | Stadium: Covebo Stadium - De Koel; Attendance: 5,318; Referee: Erwin Blank |

| 17 April 2026 37th week | Helmond Sport | 2–0 | VVV-Venlo | Helmond |
| 20:00 | Labinot Bajrami 77'; Noah Makanza 79' | Report | | Stadium: GS Staalwerken Stadion; Attendance: 2,592; Referee: Klass Clerkx |

| 24 April 2026 38th week | VVV-Venlo | 3–1 | Almere City FC | Venlo |
| 20:00 | Navarone Foor 21'; Dean Zandbergen 31' 43' | Report | Olivier de Nijs 85' | Stadium: Covebo Stadium - De Koel; Attendance: 5,614; Referee: Kevin Puts |

=== KNVB Cup ===
| 28 October 2025 1st round | VVV-Venlo | 0–3 | SC Heerenveen | Venlo |
| 21:00 | | Report | Václav Sejk 21'; Ringo Meerveld 47'; Luuk Verheij 73' (o.g.) | Stadium: Covebo Stadium - De Koel; Referee: Stan Teuben |

== Statistics ==
=== Scorers ===
| # | Player | Eerste Divisie |
|---|---|---|
| 1 | (Netherlands) Dean Zandbergen | 15 |
| 2 | (Netherlands) Bjorn van Zijl | 9 |
| 3 | (Morocco) Nassim Ait Mouhou | 4 |
| 4 | (France) Gabin Blancquart | 3 |
| 4 | (Netherlands) Jorn Triep | 3 |
| 4 | (Netherlands) Lars de Blok | 3 |
| 4 | (Germany) Philip Heise | 3 |
| 8 | (Netherlands) Naïm Matoug | 2 |
| 8 | (Netherlands) Navarone Foor | 2 |
| 10 | (Netherlands) Joshua Eijgenraam | 1 |
| 10 | (Germany) Lasse Wehmeyer | 1 |
| 10 | (Netherlands) Layee Kromah | 1 |
| 10 | (Netherlands) Luuk Verheij | 1 |
| 10 | (Netherlands) Sylian Mokono | 1 |

=== Appearances ===
| # | Player | Eerste Divisie | KNVB | Total |
|---|---|---|---|---|
| 1 | (Netherlands) Youri Schoonderwaldt | 38 | 1 | 39 |
| 2 | (Morocco) Nassim Ait Mouhou | 36 | 1 | 37 |
| 3 | (Netherlands) Navarone Foor | 34 | 1 | 35 |
| 4 | (Netherlands) Dean Zandbergen | 33 | 1 | 34 |
| 4 | (Netherlands) Lars de Blok | 33 | 1 | 34 |
| 6 | (France) Gabin Blancquart | 31 | 1 | 32 |
| 7 | (Netherlands) Joshua Eijgenraam | 30 | 1 | 31 |
| 8 | (Netherlands) Bjorn van Zijl | 30 | 0 | 30 |
| 9 | (Germany) Philip Heise | 28 | 0 | 28 |
| 9 | (Germany) Lasse Wehmeyer | 27 | 1 | 28 |
| 11 | (Netherlands) Layee Kromah | 26 | 1 | 27 |
| 12 | (Netherlands) Luuk Verheij | 25 | 1 | 26 |
| 13 | (Netherlands) Naïm Matoug | 25 | 0 | 25 |
| 13 | (Netherlands) Diego van Oorschot | 24 | 1 | 25 |
| 15 | (Netherlands) Driess Saddiki | 23 | 1 | 24 |
| 16 | (Netherlands) Mohammed Odriss | 23 | 0 | 23 |
| 17 | (Netherlands) Jorn Triep | 22 | 0 | 22 |
| 18 | (Belgium) Michael Davis | 20 | 0 | 20 |
| 18 | (Netherlands) Tijn Joosten | 20 | 0 | 20 |
| 20 | (Netherlands) Joep Kluskens | 16 | 1 | 17 |
| 20 | (Netherlands) Yousri Sbai | 17 | 0 | 17 |
| 22 | (Netherlands) Sylian Mokono | 12 | 1 | 13 |
| 23 | (Netherlands) Raf Vullers | 10 | 0 | 10 |
| 24 | (Netherlands) Thomas Reinders | 7 | 0 | 7 |
| 24 | (Netherlands) Thomas Janssen | 6 | 1 | 7 |
| 26 | (Netherlands) Dylan Timber | 3 | 0 | 3 |
| 27 | (Netherlands) Diego van Zutphen | 1 | 0 | 1 |
| 27 | (Belgium) Evangelos Soferis | 1 | 0 | 1 |
| 27 | (Netherlands) Tim Braem | 1 | 0 | 1 |
| 27 | (Netherlands) Yousri El Anbri | 1 | 0 | 1 |
| 27 | (Curaçao) Trevor Doornbusch | 0 | 1 | 1 |

=== Clean sheets ===
| # | Player | Eerste Divisie |
|---|---|---|
| 1 | (Netherlands) Youri Schoonderwaldt | 7 |

=== Disciplinary record ===
| # | Player | Eerste Divisie | | KNVB | | Total | |
| # | Player | Booked | Sent off (straight red) | Booked | Sent off (straight red) | Booked | Sent off (straight red) |
|---|---|---|---|---|---|---|---|
| 1 | (France) Gabin Blancquart | 7 | 1 | 0 | 0 | 7 | 1 |
| 2 | (Netherlands) Dean Zandbergen | 4 | 1 | 0 | 0 | 4 | 1 |
| 3 | (Netherlands) Bjorn van Zijl | 1 | 1 | 0 | 0 | 1 | 1 |
| 4 | (Germany) Lasse Wehmeyer | 0 | 1 | 0 | 0 | 0 | 1 |
| 5 | (Morocco) Nassim Ait Mouhou | 6 | 0 | 0 | 0 | 6 | 0 |
| 6 | (Netherlands) Lars de Blok | 5 | 0 | 0 | 0 | 5 | 0 |
| 6 | (Belgium) Michael Davis | 5 | 0 | 0 | 0 | 5 | 0 |
| 6 | (Netherlands) Joshua Eijgenraam | 5 | 0 | 0 | 0 | 5 | 0 |
| 9 | (Netherlands) Navarone Foor | 4 | 0 | 0 | 0 | 4 | 0 |
| 10 | (Netherlands) Mohammed Odriss | 3 | 0 | 0 | 0 | 3 | 0 |
| 10 | (Netherlands) Yousri Sbai | 3 | 0 | 0 | 0 | '3 | 0 |
| 10 | (Netherlands) Diego van Oorschot | 3 | 0 | 0 | 0 | 3 | 0 |
| 10 | (Morocco) Driess Saddiki | 3 | 0 | 0 | 0 | 3 | 0 |
| 14 | (Netherlands) Layee Kromah | 1 | 0 | 1 | 0 | 2 | 0 |
| 14 | (Netherlands) Naïm Matoug | 2 | 0 | 0 | 0 | 2 | 0 |
| 14 | (Netherlands) Thomas Reinders | 2 | 0 | 0 | 0 | 2 | 0 |
| 14 | (Netherlands) Tijn Joosten | 2 | 0 | 0 | 0 | 2 | 0 |
| 14 | (Netherlands) Sylian Mokono | 2 | 0 | 0 | 0 | 2 | 0 |
| 19 | (Netherlands) Sylian Mokono | 1 | 0 | 0 | 0 | 1 | 0 |
| 19 | (Netherlands) Luuk Verheij | 1 | 0 | 0 | 0 | 1 | 0 |
