= Mattheos Tsigkas =

Greek footballer (born 2007)

Personal information
- Date of birth: 4 June 2007 (age 19)
- Place of birth: Eretria, Greece
- Height: 1.86 m (6 ft 1 in)
- Position: Forward

Team information
- Current team: VVV-Venlo (on loan from VfB Stuttgart II)
- Number: 9

Youth career
- 2017–2022: Panathinaikos
- 2022–2026: VfB Stuttgart

Senior career*
Years	Team	Apps	(Gls)
2026–	VfB Stuttgart II	2	(0)
2026–	→ VVV-Venlo (loan)	2	(1)

International career^{‡}
2024	Greece U17	2	(1)
2025–	Greece U19	10	(3)
- * Club domestic league appearances and goals as of 22:00, 11 September 2026 (UTC) ‡ National team caps and goals as of 1 July 2026

Mattheos Tsigkas (Greek: Ματθαίος Τσίγκας; born 4 June 2007) is a Greek professional footballer who plays as forward for Eerste Divisie club VVV-Venlo, on loan from VfB Stuttgart II.

== Club career ==
=== Youth career ===
Originally from the Panathinaikos academy, Tsigkas arrived at VfB Stuttgart in July 2022, being the top scorer in the 2023–24 season of the U17 Bundesliga with 23 goals in 25 matches. On 2 March 2025 he had a standout performance in the 2024–25 UEFA Youth League knockout phase against Barcelona.

In July 2025, during the club's tour to Brazil, the player caught the attention of the local media and São Paulo FC due to his physical resemblance to Brazilian striker Hulk.

=== VfB Stuttgart ===
On 16 May 2026, Tsigkas made his professional debut for VfB Stuttgart's second men's team on the final matchday of the 2025–26 3. Liga season, in a narrow defeat to the champions, VfL Osnabrück. Six days later, VfB's under-19 side won the DFB Youth Cup, beating VfL Wolfsburg 3–0 in the final at the Karl-Liebknecht-Stadion in Potsdam for the club's fifth title in the competition.

==== VVV-Venlo (loan) ====
On 2 September 2026, Tsigkas joined Eerste Divisie club VVV-Venlo on loan for the 2026–27 season, with VVV holding an option to buy. Technical director Lino Dörrer described him as a technically able and powerful forward who had developed well in Germany.

Tsigkas made his debut on 4 September, two days after signing, replacing Alex Schalk in the 36th minute after the forward suffered a shoulder injury, in a 4–2 defeat away to Helmond Sport. With VVV trailing 2–0, he won a penalty in the 66th minute when he was held at a corner, and Lars de Blok scored from the spot to level the match. Tsigkas had the best chance of the game in the 79th minute but shot straight at goalkeeper Menno Bergsen, and Helmond scored twice in the closing stages. The defeat dropped VVV two places to sixth.

== Career statistics ==
As of match played 4 September 2026

Appearances and goals by club, season and competition
Club	Season	League			National cup		Other		Total	
Club	Season	Division	Apps	Goals	Apps	Goals	Apps	Goals	Apps	Goals
VfB Stuttgart II	2025–26	3. Liga	1	0	—		—		1	0
VfB Stuttgart II	2026–27	3. Liga	1	0	—		—		1	0
VfB Stuttgart II	Total		2	0	—		—		2	0
VVV-Venlo	2026–27	Eerste Divisie	1	0	0	0	—		1	0
Career total			3	0	0	0	0	0	3	0
