= Luuk Verheij =

Dutch footballer (born 2005)

Personal information
- Date of birth: 23 July 2005 (age 21)
- Place of birth: Weert, Netherlands
- Height: 1.95 m (6 ft 5 in)
- Positions: Centre-back; right-back

Team information
- Current team: Roda JC
- Number: 2

Youth career
- –2021: ODA
- 2021–2024: FC Eindhoven

Senior career*
| Years | Team | Apps | (Gls) |
| 2024–2025 | FC Eindhoven | 19 | (1) |
| 2025–2026 | VVV-Venlo | 27 | (1) |
| 2026– | Roda JC | 0 | (0) |
- * Club domestic league appearances and goals as of 13:36, 6 September 2026 (UTC)

Luuk Verheij (born 23 July 2005) is a Dutch professional footballer who plays as a centre-back or right-back for Eerste Divisie club Roda JC.

== Career ==
=== FC Eindhoven ===
Born in Weert, Limburg, Verheij began his football career at local club FC ODA before being scouted by FC Eindhoven in 2021. He spent three seasons in Eindhoven's youth academy before being promoted to the first team ahead of the 2024–25 season. He made his professional debut in the Eerste Divisie on 9 August 2024, coming on as a substitute in the 80th minute for Farouq Limouri during a 2–0 home victory over FC Den Bosch. On 22 September 2024, Verheij scored his first senior goal in a 4–0 away win against TOP Oss. He doubled Eindhoven's lead shortly after half-time, converting an assist from Sven Blummel.

=== VVV-Venlo ===
Having featured for Eindhoven on an amateur contract, Verheij joined VVV-Venlo on a free transfer in June 2025, signing a two-year professional deal with the club. Technical director Teun Jacobs said the club had made deliberate use of Verheij's free-agent status, and that his ability to play at both centre-back and right-back made him a useful addition to the defence. He was given the number 3 shirt.

He made his debut on 8 August, the opening matchday of the 2025–26 season, coming on in the 76th minute for Michael Davis in a 3–2 away defeat to De Graafschap. On 17 October, Verheij scored his first competitive goal for VVV in a 4–0 home win over FC Emmen. He made 28 appearances for the club, scoring once and providing one assist.

=== Roda JC ===
On 2 September 2026, the closing day of the transfer window, Verheij left VVV after a single season and signed for fellow Eerste Divisie club Roda JC on a two-year contract. Technical manager Rob Servais said that Verheij brought height and pace, knew the division, and gave Roda more options at the back.

== Career statistics ==
As of match played 30 August 2026

Appearances and goals by club, season and competition
| Club | Season | League | | | National cup | | Other | | Total | |
| Club | Season | Division | Apps | Goals | Apps | Goals | Apps | Goals | Apps | Goals |
|---|---|---|---|---|---|---|---|---|---|---|
| FC Eindhoven | 2024–25 | Eerste Divisie | 19 | 1 | 1 | 0 | — | | 20 | 1 |
| VVV-Venlo | 2025–26 | Eerste Divisie | 26 | 1 | 1 | 0 | — | | 27 | 1 |
| VVV-Venlo | 2026–27 | Eerste Divisie | 1 | 0 | 0 | 0 | — | | 1 | 0 |
| VVV-Venlo | Total | | 27 | 1 | 1 | 0 | — | | 28 | 1 |
| Roda JC | 2026–27 | Eerste Divisie | 0 | 0 | 0 | 0 | — | | 0 | 0 |
| Career total | | | 46 | 2 | 2 | 0 | 0 | 0 | 48 | 2 |
