= Diego van Oorschot =

Dutch footballer (born 2005)

Personal information
- Date of birth: 2 October 2005 (age 21)
- Place of birth: Almelo, Netherlands
- Height: 1.78 m (5 ft 10 in)
- Positions: Forward; attacking midfielder

Team information
- Current team: Heracles Almelo

Youth career
- –2015: AVC La Première
- 2015–2023: Twente/Heracles Academy

Senior career*
Years	Team	Apps	(Gls)
2023–	Heracles Almelo	10	(0)
2025–2026	→ VVV-Venlo (loan)	25	(0)
- * Club domestic league appearances and goals as of 22:53, 5 September 2026 (UTC)

Diego van Oorschot (born 2 October 2005) is a Dutch professional footballer who plays as a forward or attacking midfielder for club Heracles Almelo.

== Career ==
Van Oorschot began playing football at AVC La Première before joining the Twente/Heracles Academy in 2015. After progressing through the youth ranks, he was offered his first professional contract by Heracles Almelo in July 2023.

He made his senior debut for the club on 28 April 2023 in the Eerste Divisie match against Jong PSV, which ended in a 3–0 victory. Van Oorschot came on as a substitute in the closing minutes for Samuel Armenteros. Heracles finished the season as champions and secured promotion to the Eredivisie. His top-flight debut followed in the opening round of the subsequent season, when he again appeared as a late substitute, this time replacing Emil Hansson in a 4–1 defeat against Ajax.

In October 2023, Van Oorschot suffered a double leg fracture in a friendly against Schalke 04 which sidelined him for an extended period.

On 2 September 2025, he was loaned to VVV-Venlo for the remainder of the season to gain regular playing time. He made his debut for the club on 13 September, coming on as a 72nd-minute substitute for Bjorn van Zijl in a 2–1 home win over Helmond Sport.

== Career statistics ==
As of match played 7 August 2026

Appearances and goals by club, season and competition
Club	Season	League			National cup		Other		Total	
Club	Season	Division	Apps	Goals	Apps	Goals	Apps	Goals	Apps	Goals
Heracles Almelo	2022–23	Eerste Divisie	2	0	0	0	—		2	0
Heracles Almelo	2023–24	Eredivisie	4	0	0	0	—		4	0
Heracles Almelo	2024–25	Eredivisie	3	0	4	0	—		7	0
Heracles Almelo	2026–27	Eerste Divisie	1	0	0	0	—		1	0
Heracles Almelo	Total		10	0	4	0	—		14	0
VVV-Venlo (loan)	2025–26	Eerste Divisie	25	0	1	0	—		26	0
Career total			35	0	5	0	0	0	40	0

== Honours ==
Heracles Almelo

- Eerste Divisie: 2022–23
