= Justin Treichel =

German footballer (born 2002)

Personal information
- Date of birth: 4 March 2003 (age 23)
- Place of birth: Duisburg, Germany
- Height: 1.88 m (6 ft 2 in)
- Position: Goalkeeper

Team information
- Current team: Roda JC
- Number: 1

Youth career
- 2014–2015: TuRa 88 Duisburg
- 2015–2016: SC Bayer 05 Uerdingen
- 2016–2023: Schalke 04

Senior career*
Years	Team	Apps	(Gls)
2023–2024	Schalke 04 II	15	(0)
2024–	Roda JC	67	(0)
- * Club domestic league appearances and goals as of 16:28, 11 November 2026 (UTC)

Justin Treichel (born 4 March 2003) is a German professional footballer who plays as a goalkeeper for Eerste Divisie club Roda JC.

== Career ==
Treichel progressed through the youth academies of TuRa 88 Duisburg and SC Bayer 05 Uerdingen before joining Schalke 04's academy in 2016. He progressed through Schalke's ranks and made his first appearances for the reserve team in the 2022–23 Regionalliga West season, featuring in goal 15 times over a span of one and a half years.

After the 2023–24 season, Treichel's contract with Schalke expired, making him a free agent. He subsequently joined Dutch Eerste Divisie club Roda JC, signing a two-year contract with an option for an additional year. At the start of the season, he served as a backup goalkeeper behind Koen Bucker. Treichel made his debut on the fifth matchday of the season, coming on as a 14th-minute substitute due to an injury to Bucker in a game against Emmen. Despite Mike te Wierik scoring for Emmen, Thibo Baeten's brace and a goal from Tiago Çukur secured a 3–1 win for Roda. With Bucker sidelined for several months, Treichel made his first start against Cambuur, where he saved a penalty from Mark Diemers, contributing to a 0–0 draw.

== Career statistics ==
As of match played 6 November 2026

Appearances and goals by club, season and competition
Club	Season	League			Cup		Other		Total	
Club	Season	Division	Apps	Goals	Apps	Goals	Apps	Goals	Apps	Goals
Schalke 04 II	2022–23	Regionalliga West	5	0	—		—		5	0
Schalke 04 II	2023–24	Regionalliga West	10	0	—		—		10	0
Schalke 04 II	Total		15	0	—		—		15	0
Roda JC	2024–25	Eerste Divisie	16	0	0	0	—		16	0
Roda JC	2025–26	Eerste Divisie	37	0	2	0	2 (Note: Appearances in Eredivisie promotion/relegation playoffs)	0	41	0
Roda JC	2026–27	Eerste Divisie	14	0	1	0	—		15	0
Roda JC	Total		67	0	3	0	2	0	72	0
Career total			82	0	3	0	2	0	87	0
