= Jorn Triep =

Dutch footballer (born 2005)

Personal information
- Date of birth: 28 March 2005 (age 21)
- Place of birth: Delft, Netherlands
- Position: Attacking midfielder

Team information
- Current team: De Graafschap
- Number: 28

Youth career
- –2017: DHL
- 2017–2023: Sparta Rotterdam

Senior career*
Years	Team	Apps	(Gls)
2023–2026	Jong Sparta	56	(21)
2023–2026	Sparta Rotterdam	0	(0)
2025–2026	→ VVV-Venlo (loan)	22	(3)
2026–	De Graafschap	2	(0)
- * Club domestic league appearances and goals as of 15:08, 21 September 2026 (UTC)

Jorn Triep (born 28 March 2005) is a Dutch professional footballer who plays as an attacking midfielder for Eerste Divisie club De Graafschap.

== Career ==
=== Sparta Rotterdam ===
Triep was born in Delft and began playing youth football with local club DHL before joining the youth academy of Sparta Rotterdam in 2017. He made his senior debut for Sparta's reserve side, Jong Sparta, on 26 August 2023, coming on as a substitute for Dano Lourens in the 84th minute of a 1–0 home defeat to ADO '20.

During the 2023–24 season, Triep became a regular member of the reserve team. In the winter break, he joined Sparta's first-team squad on a training camp in Spain, where he made an unofficial first-team appearance in a friendly match against Oud-Heverlee Leuven. In April 2024, he signed his first professional contract with the club, a two-year deal with an option for an additional year. Triep scored 21 goals in 55 league appearances for Jong Sparta in the Tweede Divisie.

==== VVV-Venlo (loan) ====
In May 2025, Triep signed a new three-year contract with Sparta Rotterdam, extending his stay at the club until 2028, and was subsequently loaned to VVV-Venlo for the 2025–26 season. He made his starting debut for the club on 8 August 2025 in a 3–2 away defeat against De Graafschap in the Eerste Divisie, providing an assist for Navarone Foor's equalising goal. On 13 September 2025, he scored his first professional goal, opening the scoring in a 2–1 home victory over Helmond Sport. He left VVV as his loan deal expired at the end of the season, having scored three goals in 22 appearances.

=== De Graafschap ===
On 31 August 2026, Triep signed a two-year contract with a one-year option with Eerste Divisie club De Graafschap. He made his debut for the club on 4 September, replacing Gabriele Finocchiaro in the 71st minute of a 5–0 away loss to Heracles Almelo.

== Career statistics ==
As of match played 11 September 2026

Appearances and goals by club, season and competition
Club	Season	League			National cup		Other		Total	
Club	Season	Division	Apps	Goals	Apps	Goals	Apps	Goals	Apps	Goals
Jong Sparta	2023–24	Tweede Divisie	28	11	—		—		28	11
Jong Sparta	2024–25	Tweede Divisie	27	10	—		2 (Note: Appearances in Tweede Divisie play-offs)	1	27	10
Jong Sparta	2026–27	Tweede Divisie	1	0	—		—		1	0
Jong Sparta	Total		56	21	—		2	1	58	21
VVV-Venlo (loan)	2025–26	Eerste Divisie	22	3	0	0	—		22	3
De Graafschap	2026–27	Eerste Divisie	2	0	0	0	—		2	0
Career total			80	24	0	0	2	1	82	25
