= Éanna Clancy =

Irish footballer (born 2004)

Personal information
- Full name: Éanna Clancy
- Date of birth: 26 February 2004 (age 22)
- Place of birth: Glenfarne, Ireland
- Height: 1.85 m (6 ft 1 in)
- Position: Defender

Team information
- Current team: VVV-Venlo
- Number: 4

Youth career
- 2010–2018: Manorhamilton Rangers
- 2018–2022: Sligo Rovers

Senior career*
Years	Team	Apps	(Gls)
2022–2023	Sligo Rovers	15	(1)
2023–2026	UCD	77	(9)
2026–	VVV-Venlo	12	(4)
- * Club domestic league appearances and goals as of 17:59, 27 October 2026 (UTC)

Éanna Clancy (Irish: [ˈeɪnaˈ ˈklan-see] Ay-nah Klan-see); (born 26 February 2004) is an Irish professional footballer who plays as a defender for Eerste Divisie club VVV-Venlo. He previously played for Sligo Rovers and UCD.

== Career ==
=== Youth career ===
Clancy is a native of Glenfarne, County Leitrim and began playing football with nearby club Manorhamilton Rangers before joining the academy of League of Ireland club Sligo Rovers aged 14. In March 2022, he represented the Republic of Ireland Schools team.

=== Sligo Rovers ===
Having come through the club's academy, Clancy's first involvement in the matchday squad at senior level for Sligo Rovers came in June 2022, before he made his senior debut on 17 July 2022, replacing the injured Shane Blaney in the 34th minute of a 2–0 defeat against UCD at The Showgrounds. On 8 August 2022, he signed his first professional contract with the club. On 11 March 2023, Clancy scored the first senior goal of his career, in a 2–2 draw at home to Cork City.

=== UCD ===
On 5 July 2023, Clancy joined bottom of the table League of Ireland Premier Division club UCD on a full-time football scholarship with the university. He made 7 appearances by the end of the 2023 season as UCD were relegated to the League of Ireland First Division. After their relegation, Clancy stepped up as a leader, captaining the side and scoring an impressive 6 goals in 36 games from centre-back, which saw him voted into the PFAI First Division Team of the Year by his fellow players in the league. He remained at UCD until the summer of 2026 after he completed his degree at the university, having scored 10 goals in 90 appearances during his 3 years with the club.

=== VVV-Venlo ===
On 23 July 2026, Clancy signed for Eerste Divisie club VVV-Venlo on a two-year contract for an undisclosed fee, turning down interest from several League of Ireland Premier Division clubs in the process. He started off life in the Netherlands well, scoring 4 goals in his first 12 appearances for his new club.

== International career ==
In February 2023, Clancy was called up to a Republic of Ireland U19 assessment squad, then the following month was called in to train with the Republic of Ireland U21 squad ahead of a friendly against Iceland U21, but he was ultimately not capped at either level.

== Personal life ==
Clancy completed a degree in Commerce at University College Dublin while on a full-time football scholarship with the university. He played Gaelic football for Glencar–Manorhamilton GAA during his youth and turned down an opportunity to join the senior Leitrim GAA side by manager Andy Moran during his time with UCD, as he was in the middle of his scholarship.

== Career statistics ==
As of match played on 24 October 2026

Appearances and goals by club, season and competition
Club	Season	League			National Cup (Note: Includes FAI Cup & KNVB Cup)		Europe		Other		Total	
Club	Season	Division	Apps	Goals	Apps	Goals	Apps	Goals	Apps	Goals	Apps	Goals
Sligo Rovers	2022	LOI Premier Division	5	0	1	0	0 (Note: Appearan±ces in the UEFA Europa Conference League)	0	–		6	0
Sligo Rovers	2023	LOI Premier Division	10	1	–		–		–		10	1
Sligo Rovers	Total		15	1	1	0	0	0	–		16	1
UCD	2023	LOI Premier Division	7	0	0	0	–		–		7	0
UCD	2024	LOI First Division	29	6	3	0	–		4 (Note: 2 appearances in the Leinster Senior Cup; 2 appearances in the 2024 League of Ireland First Division Playoffs)	0	36	6
UCD	2025	LOI First Division	25	3	1	0	–		4 (Note: 2 appearances, 1 goal in the Leinster Senior Cup; 2 appearances in the 2025 League of Ireland play-offs)	1	30	4
UCD	2026	LOI First Division	16	0	1	0	–		0 (Note: Appearance(s) in the Leinster Senior Cup)	0	17	0
UCD	Total		77	9	5	0	–		8	1	90	10
VVV-Venlo	2026–27	Eerste Divisie	12	4	0	0	–		–		12	4
Career total			104	14	6	0	0	0	8	1	118	15

== Honours ==
Individual

- PFAI First Division Team of the Year: 2024
