= Nassim Ait Mouhou =

Footballer (born 2004)

Personal information
- Date of birth: 1 August 2004 (age 22)
- Place of birth: Cambrai, France
- Position: Winger

Team information
- Current team: VVV-Venlo
- Number: 11

Youth career
- 2011–2015: AC Cambrai
- 2015–2022: Valenciennes

Senior career*
Years	Team	Apps	(Gls)
2022–2024	Valenciennes II	40	(5)
2024–2025	Lens II	22	(3)
2025–	VVV-Venlo	36	(4)
- * Club domestic league appearances and goals as of 28 April 2026

Nassim Ait Mouhou (born 1 August 2004) is a professional footballer who plays as a winger for Dutch Eerste Divisie club VVV-Venlo. Born in France, he is of Moroccan descent.

== Club career ==
Ait Mouhou began playing football at AC Cambrai before joining the youth academy of Valenciennes. He made his debut for the club's reserve team competing in National 3, on 21 May 2022, coming on in a 3–1 home defeat against Boulogne II. Two weeks later, he scored his first official goal for the reserve side in a 4–2 home defeat to Lille II.

In the summer of 2024, Ait Mouhou joined Lens II. He later joined VVV-Venlo on trial in May 2025, where he was reunited with former teammate Gabin Blancquart. The trial resulted in Ait Mouhou signing a two-year contract with an option for an additional season in June 2025.

Ait Mouhou made his competitive debut for the club on 8 August 2025 in the Eerste Divisie, appearing as a substitute in a 3–2 away defeat to De Graafschap. He replaced Layee Kromah in the 61st minute and scored shortly after coming on.

== International career ==
In November 2020, Ait Mouhou was selected for the Morocco national under-17 football team. In addition to Morocco, he is also eligible to represent France.

== Career statistics ==
As of match played 12 December 2025

Appearances and goals by club, season and competition
Club	Season	League			National cup		Other		Total	
Club	Season	Division	Apps	Goals	Apps	Goals	Apps	Goals	Apps	Goals
Valenciennes II	2021–22	National 3	3	1	—		—		3	1
Valenciennes II	2022–23	National 3	12	3	—		—		12	3
Valenciennes II	2023–24	National 3	25	1	—		—		25	1
Valenciennes II	Total		40	5	—		—		40	5
Lens II	2024–25	National 3	22	3	—		—		22	3
VVV-Venlo	2025–26	Eerste Divisie	20	3	1	0	—		21	3
Career total			82	11	1	0	0	0	83	11
