= Dean Zandbergen =

Dutch footballer (born 2001)

Personal information
- Full name: Dean Xylon Zandbergen
- Date of birth: 5 September 2001 (age 25)
- Place of birth: Zoetermeer, Netherlands
- Height: 1.88 m (6 ft 2 in)
- Position: Striker

Team information
- Current team: Dinamo București
- Number: 97

Youth career
- –2015: TOGB
- 2015–2018: Excelsior Rotterdam
- 2018–2020: BVV Barendrecht
- 2020–2021: RKVV Westlandia

Senior career*
Years	Team	Apps	(Gls)
2021–2022	Excelsior Maassluis	5	(0)
2022–2023	TOGB	33	(19)
2023–2024	Sparta Rotterdam	0	(0)
2023–2024	Jong Sparta	32	(5)
2024–2025	Dordrecht	24	(3)
2025–2026	VVV-Venlo	47	(21)
2026–	Dinamo București	8	(2)
- * Club domestic league appearances and goals as of 6 November 2026

Dean Xylon Zandbergen (born 5 September 2001) is a Dutch professional footballer who plays as a striker for Liga I club Dinamo București.

== Club career ==
=== Early career ===
Zandbergen switched from RKVV Westlandia to Excelsior Maassluis in 2021. On 25 September 2021, he made his debut with the second division team during an away match against SVV Scheveningen, which he won 0–3, as a substitute for Bram Wennekers.

=== TOGB ===
After the season, Zandbergen and his twin brother Glenn returned to TOGB, where he had previously played football in the F youth team. At the brand new third division team, he became the top scorer with 19 goals and thus attracted the interest of several professional clubs, including Sparta Rotterdam.

=== Sparta Rotterdam ===
In June 2023, Zandbergen signed an amateur contract with Sparta that placed him in the promising team. On 7 October 2023, Zandbergen scored his first goal on behalf of Jong Sparta Rotterdam during a 2–1 home match against Rijnsburgse Boys. A few weeks later, coach Jeroen Rijsdijk let him make his debut in the first team. During a 0-2 cup match at IJsselmeervogels, he came on for Charles-Andreas Brym in the 90th minute. He also played in the next cup round, an away match at ADO Den Haag (2–0 loss).

=== Dordrecht ===
In May 2024, Zandbergen signed his first professional contract with FC Dordrecht, which signed him for two years with an option for another year. At the first division team he eventually lost the competition with Devin Haen. Zandebergen played all competition matches, but usually only as a substitute.

=== VVV-Venlo ===
On the last day of the winter transfer period, Zandbergen made a transfer to VVV-Venlo where he signed a contract until mid-2026 with an option for an extra season.

== Personal life ==
Born in the Netherlands, Zandbergen is of Indonesian descent.

== Career statistics ==
As of match played 6 November 2026

Appearances and goals by club, season and competition
Club	Season	League			National cup (Note: Includes KNVB Beker, Cupa României)		Europe		Other		Total	
Club	Season	Division	Apps	Goals	Apps	Goals	Apps	Goals	Apps	Goals	Apps	Goals
Excelsior Maassluis	2021–22	Tweede Divisie	5	0	0	0	—		—		5	0
TOGB	2022–23	Derde Divisie	33	19	1	0	—		—		34	19
Sparta Rotterdam	2023–24	Eredivisie	0	0	2	0	—		0	0	2	0
Jong Sparta	2023–24	Tweede Divisie	32	5	—		—		—		32	5
Dordrecht	2024–25	Eerste Divisie	24	3	1	0	—		—		25	3
VVV-Venlo	2024–25	Eerste Divisie	9	2	—		—		—		9	2
VVV-Venlo	2025–26	Eerste Divisie	34	15	1	0	—		—		35	15
VVV-Venlo	2026–27	Eerste Divisie	4	4	—		—		—		4	4
VVV-Venlo	Total		47	21	1	0	—		—		48	21
Dinamo București	2026–27	Liga I	8	2	1	2	—		—		9	4
Career total			149	50	6	2	—		—		155	52
