= Lars de Blok =

Dutch footballer (born 2004)

Personal information
- Date of birth: 14 June 2004 (age 22)
- Place of birth: Ouddorp, Netherlands
- Height: 1.79 m (5 ft 10 in)
- Position: Left-back

Team information
- Current team: VVV-Venlo
- Number: 5

Youth career
- 2008–2011: WFB
- 2011–2025: Feyenoord

Senior career*
Years	Team	Apps	(Gls)
2025–	VVV-Venlo	41	(4)
- * Club domestic league appearances and goals as of 07:06, 12 October 2026 (UTC)

Lars de Blok (born 14 June 2004) is a Dutch professional footballer who plays as a left-back for Eerste Divisie club VVV-Venlo.

== Career ==
=== Early life and career ===
De Blok grew up in Ouddorp on Goeree-Overflakkee and began playing football at local club VV WFB, before being scouted by Feyenoord in 2011. He progressed through the club's youth system, where he transitioned from an attacking role to midfield before being redeployed in defence, eventually establishing himself as a left-back. In May 2021, he signed his first professional contract. In May 2024, Feyenoord extended his contract by a further year, until mid-2025. Although he did not make a competitive first-team appearance for the Rotterdam club, De Blok featured in several friendly matches.

=== VVV-Venlo ===
In July 2025, he left Feyenoord and joined Eerste Divisie club VVV-Venlo on a free transfer following a successful trial period, signing a two-year contract running until mid-2027.

De Blok made his competitive debut for VVV-Venlo on 8 August 2025 in the opening match of the 2025–26 season against De Graafschap, coming on as a substitute in the 61st minute for Philip Heise. On 7 November 2025, he scored his first professional goals, converting both a penalty and a free kick in a 2–0 away victory over Jong AZ. The performance earned him the man-of-the-match distinction, as he had by then established himself as VVV-Venlo's regular left-back.

== Career statistics ==
As of match played 26 September 2026

Appearances and goals by club, season and competition
Club	Season	League			National cup		Other		Total	
Club	Season	Division	Apps	Goals	Apps	Goals	Apps	Goals	Apps	Goals
VVV-Venlo	2025–26	Eerste Divisie	33	3	1	0	—		34	3
VVV-Venlo	2026–27	Eerste Divisie	8	1	0	0	—		8	1
Career total			41	4	1	0	0	0	42	4
