= Jean-Paul N'Djoli =

Congolese footballer (born 2000)

Personal information
- Date of birth: 9 October 2000 (age 26)
- Place of birth: Sèvres, France
- Height: 6 ft 3 in (1.91 m)
- Position: Forward

Team information
- Current team: Heracles Almelo
- Number: 27

Youth career
- 2016–2018: Évreux FC 27

Senior career*
Years	Team	Apps	(Gls)
2018–2021	Évreux FC 27	31	(3)
2021	Rayo Vallecano B	0	(0)
2021–2022	Hércules CF B	34	(6)
2022–2024	Hércules CF	31	(3)
2024	→ CD Alcoyano (loan)	1	(0)
2024	→ Atlético Saguntino (loan)	13	(3)
2024–2025	Badalona Futur	11	(0)
2025	FC Langenthal	13	(3)
2025–2026	SC Brühl	16	(12)
2026	FC Wil	15	(5)
2026–	Heracles Almelo	11	(13)
- * Club domestic league appearances and goals as of 2 October 2026

Jean-Paul Pierre Emmanuel Marc N'Djoli (born 9 October 2000) is a French-Congolese footballer who plays as a forward for Eerste Divisie side Heracles Almelo.

== Club career ==
=== Early years ===
N'Djoli began his football career at Évreux FC 27, playing in the fourth tier of French football. In July 2021, he joined Rayo Vallecano, where he was offered a two-year contract and assigned to their B-team. Although he played during the pre-season, the club president refused to approve his contract, instead wanting him to sign a second agreement with very poor terms. Along with five other players from the B-team and the youth squad, N'Djoli lived in appalling conditions and went unpaid. The Spanish players' union intervened, and he left the club after two months.

=== Spanish lower leagues ===
In November 2021, Spanish side Hércules CF announced the signing of N'Djoli. While there, in March 2022, he was subjected to racist abuse by an opponent during a match between Hércules CF B and Torrent CF in the Tercera Federación.

From October 2022, he played 31 matches in the fourth tier of Spanish football.

In January 2024, N'Djoli was loaned to CD Alcoyano. That same month, he returned, only to be loaned out again to Atlético Saguntino for the remainder of the season. At the end of the season, Badalona Futur signed N'Djoli on a free transfer in August 2024. During his six months there, he only received one month of his salary.

=== Switzerland ===
After three and a half years in Spain, N'Djoli moved to Switzerland in February 2025, signing with FC Langenthal, a club competing in the fourth tier of the Swiss football pyramid. At the end of the 2024/25 season, he moved up a level to join SC Brühl. The Frenchman scored twelve goals in sixteen appearances there, prompting FC Wil, a club playing in the second tier, to sign him. He signed his first professional contract with the club at the age of 25.

=== Heracles Almelo ===
In the summer of 2026, N'Djoli moved to Heracles Almelo, where he signed a contract for two seasons, with an option to extend for two extra years. He made his debut in the Eerste Divisie on August 7, in an away match against VVV-Venlo. Coach Vincent Heilmann named him in the starting lineup, and with two goals and an assist, he helped Heracles secure a 3–4 victory. He also scored twice in each of the subsequent victories over FC Den Bosch (3–2) and Jong FC Utrecht (1–6). N'Djoli did not score against FC Eindhoven (a 3–1 win), but in the match after that, he scored a hat-trick in a 5–0 victory over De Graafschap.

== Career statistics ==
Season	Club	Competition	League		Cup		Total	
Season	Club	Competition	Caps	Goals	Caps	Goals	Caps	Goals
2018/19	Évreux FC 27	National 3	10	0	0	0	10	0
2019/20	Évreux FC 27	National 3	16	0	1	1	17	1
2020/21	Évreux FC 27	National 3	5	2	1	0	6	2
2021/22	Hércules B	Tercera Federación RFEF	-	-	-	-	-	-
2022/23	Hércules	Segunda Federación	20	3	0	0	20	3
2023/24	Hércules	Segunda Federación	11	0	1	0	12	0
2023/24	→ CD Alcoyano	Primera Federación	1	0	0	0	1	0
2023/24	→ Atlético Saguntino	Segunda Federación	13	3	0	0	13	3
2024/25	Badalona Futur	Segunda Federación	11	0	0	0	11	0
2024/25	FC Langenthal	1. Liga	14	3	0	0	14	3
2025/26	SC Brühl	Promotion League	16	12	0	0	16	12
2025/26	FC Wil	Challenge League	15	5	0	0	15	5
2026/27	Heracles Almelo	Eerste divisie	11	13	0	0	11	13
Total			143	41	3	1	146	42

Updated on 19 oktober 2026.
