= Bjorn van Zijl =

Dutch footballer (born 2004)

Personal information
- Date of birth: 9 July 2004 (age 22)
- Place of birth: Roermond, Netherlands
- Position: Striker

Team information
- Current team: De Graafschap
- Number: 7

Youth career
- SC Leeuwen
- 2024–2025: VVV-Venlo

Senior career*
Years	Team	Apps	(Gls)
2023–2024	SC Leeuwen		
2025–2026	VVV-Venlo	43	(11)
2026–	De Graafschap	14	(3)
- * Club domestic league appearances and goals as of 11:11, 20 November 2026 (UTC)

Bjorn van Zijl (born 9 July 2004) is a Dutch professional footballer who plays as a striker for Eerste Divisie club De Graafschap.

== Career ==
=== Early years ===
Van Zijl was born in Roermond, and progressed through the youth system of local side SC Leeuwen, where he made his senior debut during the 2023–24 season in the Vijfde Klasse of Dutch amateur football; the tenth and lowest tier. He finished the season as the club's leading goalscorer. In March 2024, he was among seven players invited to a trial with the reserve team of VVV-Venlo, featuring in a friendly match against NEC U21.

He left SC Leeuwen in May 2024 after scoring five goals in a 6–1 away victory over VVV '03, a result that secured the league title for his club.

=== VVV-Venlo ===
On 1 June 2024, Van Zijl joined VVV-Venlo, initially playing for the club's under-21 team. He scored regularly at that level, which led to his inclusion in the first-team squad later in the season. Owing to injuries within the senior squad, head coach John Lammers selected him for the first team for the first time for an away match against Jong AZ on 3 February 2025, and he made his competitive senior debut later that day, appearing as a substitute in a 3–0 away defeat to Jong AZ in the Eerste Divisie. On 22 February 2025, again appearing as a substitute, he scored his first professional goal in a 3–1 home defeat against Volendam. He made his first start for VVV on 22 March in a 2–2 home draw against Eindhoven. During the second half of the 2024–25 season, Van Zijl made 13 league appearances, scoring two goals.

In June 2025, he signed his first professional contract with VVV-Venlo, running until 1 July 2027 and including an option for an additional season. On 17 October, he scored two goals in a 4–0 win over Emmen. He subsequently missed several matches due to lingering effects of infectious mononucleosis.

=== De Graafschap ===
On 2 July 2026, Van Zijl signed a three-year contract with an option for a further year with Eerste Divisie club De Graafschap.

== Career statistics ==
As of match played 14 November 2026

Appearances and goals by club, season and competition
Club	Season	League			National cup		Other		Total	
Club	Season	Division	Apps	Goals	Apps	Goals	Apps	Goals	Apps	Goals
VVV-Venlo	2024–25	Eerste Divisie	13	2	0	0	—		13	2
VVV-Venlo	2025–26	Eerste Divisie	30	9	0	0	—		30	9
VVV-Venlo	Total		43	11	0	0	—		43	11
De Graafschap	2026–27	Eerste Divisie	14	3	1	0	—		15	3
Career total			57	14	1	0	0	0	58	14
