= Youri Schoonderwaldt =

Dutch footballer (born 2000)

Personal information
- Date of birth: 13 March 2000 (age 26)
- Place of birth: Amsterdam, Netherlands
- Height: 1.95 m (6 ft 5 in)
- Position: Goalkeeper

Team information
- Current team: VVV-Venlo

Youth career
- 2011–2017: VFC Vlaardingen
- 2017–2019: ADO Den Haag

Senior career*
Years	Team	Apps	(Gls)
2019–2022	ADO Den Haag	0	(0)
2022	Quick Boys	0	(0)
2022–2026	Sparta Rotterdam II	28	(0)
2022–2026	Sparta Rotterdam	2	(0)
2025–2026	→ VVV-Venlo (loan)	38	(0)
2026–	VVV-Venlo	0	(0)
- * Club domestic league appearances and goals as of 28 April 2026

Youri Schoonderwaldt (born 13 March 2000) is a Dutch professional footballer who plays as a goalkeeper for Eerste Divisie club VVV-Venlo.

== Professional career ==
Schoonderwaldt is a youth product of VFC Vlaardingen since the age of 11, and moved to ADO Den Haag in 2017. On 11 April 2020, he signed his first professional contract with ADO Den Haag. After 3 years as reserve goalkeeper with ADO Den Haag without a senior appearance, he briefly transferred to the amateur club Quick Boys on 13 May 2022. A month later, he transferred to Sparta Rotterdam signing a 1+1 year contract. He made his professional debut with Sparta Rotterdam in a 2–1 Eredivisie win over Groningen on 17 September 2022.

On 19 May 2025, Schoonderwaldt was loaned by VVV-Venlo for the 2025–26 season. On 10 July 2026, VVV-Venlo made the transfer permanent and signed a two-season deal with Schoonderwaldt.

== Career statistics ==
As of match played 25 April 2026

Appearances and goals by club, season and competition
Club	Season	League			National Cup		Continental		Other		Total	
Club	Season	Division	Apps	Goals	Apps	Goals	Apps	Goals	Apps	Goals	Apps	Goals
ADO Den Haag II	2018–19	Beloften Eredivisie	3	0	—		—		—		3	0
ADO Den Haag II	2019–20	Derde Divisie	15	0	—		—		—		15	0
ADO Den Haag II	Total		18	0	—		—		—		18	0
ADO Den Haag	2019–20	Eredivisie	0	0	0	0	—		—		0	0
ADO Den Haag	2020–21	Eredivisie	0	0	0	0	—		—		0	0
ADO Den Haag	2021–22	Eerste Divisie	0	0	0	0	—		—		0	0
ADO Den Haag	Total		0	0	0	0	—		—		0	0
Jong Sparta Rotterdam	2022–23	Tweede Divisie	18	0	—		—		—		18	0
Jong Sparta Rotterdam	2023–24	Tweede Divisie	6	0	—		—		—		6	0
Jong Sparta Rotterdam	2024–25	Tweede Divisie	4	0	—		—		—		4	0
Jong Sparta Rotterdam	Total		28	0	—		—		—		28	0
Sparta Rotterdam	2022–23	Eredivisie	2	0	0	0	—		0	0	2	0
Sparta Rotterdam	2023–24	Eredivisie	0	0	0	0	—		0	0	0	0
Sparta Rotterdam	Total		2	0	0	0	—		0	0	2	0
VVV-Venlo (loan)	2025–26	Eerste Divisie	38	0	1	0	—		—		39	0
VVV-Venlo	2026–27	Eerste Divisie	0	0	0	0	—		—		0	0
Career total			86	0	1	0	0	0	0	0	87	0
