= Edhy Zuliani =

Algerian footballer (born 2004)

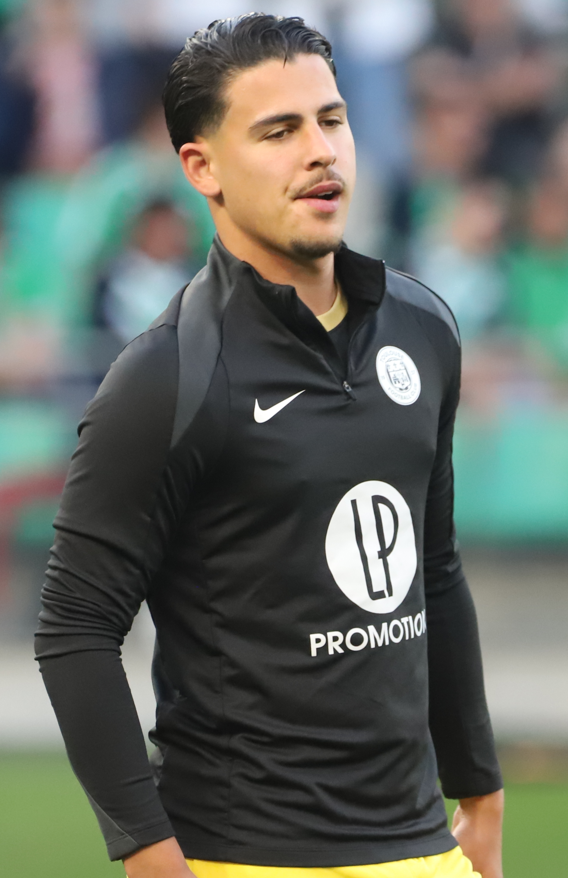

Personal information
- Full name: Edhy Yvan Zuliani
- Date of birth: 11 August 2004 (age 22)
- Place of birth: Toulouse, France
- Height: 1.75 m (5 ft 9 in)
- Position: Midfielder

Team information
- Current team: VVV-Venlo

Youth career
- 2010–2013: RC Eaunois
- 2013–2024: Toulouse FC

Senior career*
Years	Team	Apps	(Gls)
2022–2026	Toulouse II	58	(10)
2025–2026	Toulouse FC	1	(0)
2025–2026	→ Pau FC (loan)	17	(0)
2026–	VVV-Venlo	0	(0)

International career^{‡}
2021	Algeria U17	3	(1)
2021	Algeria U18	3	(0)
- * Club domestic league appearances and goals as of 11 May 2026 ‡ National team caps and goals as of 15:54, 31 January 2025 (UTC)

Edhy Yvan Zuliani (born 11 August 2004) is a professional footballer who plays as a midfielder for Dutch Eerste Divisie club VVV-Venlo. Born in France, he represents Algeria at youth international level.

== Club career ==
Zuliani began his football career with RC Eaunois before joining the academy of Toulouse FC in 2013, at the age of nine. He progressed through the club's youth system and made his debut with the reserve team in 2022 in Championnat National 3.

On 10 June 2024, he signed his first professional contract with Toulouse FC. He made his professional debut on 2 February 2025, coming on as a substitute in a 1–1 Ligue 1 draw against OGC Nice.

Later in 2025, he was loaned to Pau FC to gain more first-team experience under manager Nicolas Usaï.

On 25 June 2026, Zuliani signed a two-year contract with VVV-Venlo in the Netherlands.

== International career ==
Born in France, Zuliani is of Algerian and Italian descent—his mother is Algerian and his father is Italian.

He represented Algeria U17 at the 2021 UNAF U-17 Tournament, scoring once in three appearances. He later captained the Algeria U18 team during the 2022 Mediterranean Games.

== Playing style ==
Zuliani is a left-footed midfielder who primarily plays on the left side or in an attacking role.
