= Ismail Oulad M'Hand =

Footballer (born 2005)

Ismail Oulad M'hand
Personal information
- Date of birth: 11 January 2005 (age 21)
- Place of birth: The Hague, Netherlands
- Height: 1.78 m (5 ft 10 in)
- Position: Midfielder

Team information
- Current team: VVV-Venlo
- Number: 8

Youth career
- VCS Den Haag
- –2020: Feyenoord
- 2020–2025: Arsenal

Senior career*
Years	Team	Apps	(Gls)
2025–2026	Željezničar	7	(0)
2026–	VVV-Venlo	5	(0)

International career
2023	Morocco U20	2	(0)
- * Club domestic league appearances and goals as of 4 October 2026

Ismail Oulad M'Hand (Arabic: إسماعيل ولد محند; born 11 January 2005) is a professional footballer who plays as a midfielder for Eerste Divisie club VVV-Venlo. Born in the Netherlands, he represents Morocco internationally.

== Club career ==
M'Hand initially started his playing career as a youth player at VCS Den Haag in his hometown of The Hague, before moving to the academy of Dutch club Feyenoord. He arrived at Arsenal in England from Feyenoord in 2020. He signed a scholarship contract with the club in the summer of 2023. He left Arsenal at the end of the 2024–25 season.

M'Hand signed for Bosnian Premier League side Željezničar in October 2025, agreeing to a contract until the end of the 2026–27 season. He made his debut for Željezničar against Velež Mostar on 11 November 2025.

In August 2026, he signed for Dutch club VVV-Venlo on a two-year contract.

== International career ==
Born in The Hague, M'Hand is also eligible to represent the Netherlands or Morocco. In May 2023, he was called up to the Moroccan U20 side.

== Personal life ==
M'Hand is of Moroccan descent and is the younger brother of fellow footballer Salah-Eddine Oulad M'Hand.
