= Mohammed Odriss =

Dutch footballer (born 2004)

Personal information
- Date of birth: 19 September 2004 (age 22)
- Place of birth: Tegelen, Netherlands
- Height: 1.76 m (5 ft 9 in)
- Position: Midfielder

Team information
- Current team: VVV-Venlo
- Number: 24

Youth career
- SC Irene
- 2013–2023: VVV-Venlo

Senior career*
Years	Team	Apps	(Gls)
2023–	VVV-Venlo	44	(0)
- * Club domestic league appearances and goals as of 28 April 2026

Mohammed Odriss (born 19 September 2004) is a Dutch professional footballer who plays as a midfielder for Eerste Divisie club VVV-Venlo.

== Club career ==
Odriss was born in Tegelen, Limburg, and began playing football at local amateur club SC Irene before joining their cooperation club VVV-Venlo in 2013, where he entered the club's youth academy.

Ahead of the 2023–24 season, head coach Rick Kruys selected Odriss as one of ten youth players to participate in the first-team pre-season preparations. He made his professional debut on 13 August 2023 in the opening match of the season, a 3–1 home loss to provincial rivals MVV, replacing Elias Sierra as a substitute in the 64th minute.

On 21 March 2024, Odriss signed his first professional contract with VVV-Venlo, which ran until 1 July 2026 and included an option for a further season.

During the 2024–25 season, Odriss missed a significant portion of the campaign due to injury, limiting his number of appearances. In the following season, after the departure of head coach John Lammers, he became a regular member of the starting line-up. In November 2025, Odriss extended his contract with the club until 2027, with an option for an additional year.

== Career statistics ==
As of match played 16 January 2026

Appearances and goals by club, season and competition
Club	Season	League			National cup		Other		Total	
Club	Season	Division	Apps	Goals	Apps	Goals	Apps	Goals	Apps	Goals
VVV-Venlo	2023–24	Eerste Divisie	18	0	0	0	—		18	0
VVV-Venlo	2024–25	Eerste Divisie	3	0	1	0	—		4	0
VVV-Venlo	2025–26	Eerste Divisie	16	0	0	0	—		16	0
Career total			37	0	1	0	0	0	38	0
