= Freddy Quispel =

Dutch footballer (born 2000)

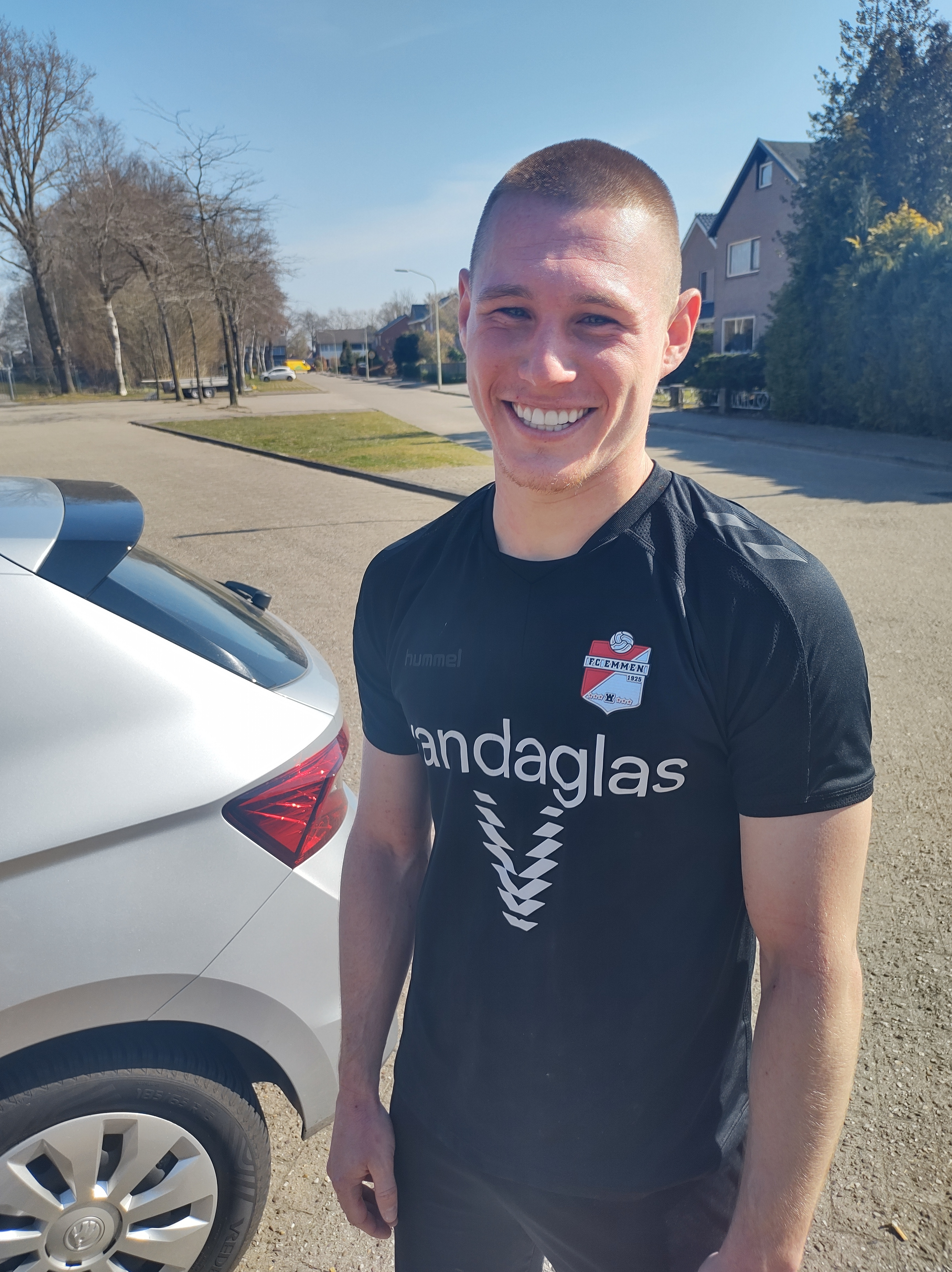
- Quispel (2025)

Personal information
- Date of birth: 23 October 2000 (age 26)
- Place of birth: Emmen, Netherlands
- Height: 1.77 m (5 ft 10 in)
- Position: Forward

Team information
- Current team: FC Emmen
- Number: 12

Youth career
- WKE '16
- VV Emmen
- FC Twente
- 2015–2019: FC Emmen

Senior career*
Years	Team	Apps	(Gls)
2019–2020	FC Emmen	3	(0)
2020	VfB Oldenburg	0	(0)
2020–2021	Jong PEC Zwolle		
2021–2022	ACV	30	(6)
2022–2023	VV Staphorst	24	(2)
2023–2024	ACV	31	(13)
2024–	FC Emmen	49	(5)
- * Club domestic league appearances and goals as of 28 April 2026

Freddy Quispel (born 23 October 2000) is a Dutch professional footballer who plays as a forward for Eerste Divisie club FC Emmen. Born in Emmen in the Netherlands, he progressed through the youth systems of WKE ’16, VV Emmen, FC Twente and FC Emmen.

== Youth career ==
Quispel started playing football at the age of six with WKE '16 and later joined VV Emmen. After four years in FC Twente’s academy, he was released from the under‑15 team and joined FC Emmen in 2015 to complete his youth development.

== Club career ==
Quispel made his professional debut for FC Emmen in a 2–0 Eredivisie loss to SC Heerenveen on 17 August 2019.

In the summer of 2020, he completed a free transfer to German fourth-tier side VfB Oldenburg, but did not make an appearance for the club. A few months later, he returned to the Netherlands to join PEC Zwolle's reserve team, where his younger brother Jan was playing.

In July 2021, Quispel switched to Derde Divisie club ACV. In January 2022 it was confirmed that from the upcoming 2022–23 season Quispel would play for league rivals VV Staphorst. In February 2023, ACV confirmed that Quispel would return to the club ahead of the 2023–24 season. ACV was promoted to the 2023–24 Tweede Divisie prior to Quispel's return.

On 22 June 2024, Quispel returned to FC Emmen on a two-year contract.

== Personal life ==
Quispel's father, Joost Quispel, was also a footballer who played for FC Emmen.
