= Michael Davis (Belgian footballer) =

Belgian footballer

Personal information
- Date of birth: 21 January 2002 (age 24)
- Place of birth: Brussels, Belgium
- Height: 1.80 m (5 ft 11 in)
- Position: Centre-back

Team information
- Current team: VVV-Venlo
- Number: 31

Youth career
- RWDM
- –2021: Mechelen

Senior career*
Years	Team	Apps	(Gls)
2021–2023	Beveren	5	(1)
2023	→ Young Reds (loan)	24	(0)
2023–2025	Young Reds	43	(0)
2025–	VVV-Venlo	20	(0)

International career^{‡}
2019	Belgium U17	5	(0)
2019	Belgium U19	1	(0)
- * Club domestic league appearances and goals as of 28 April 2026 ‡ National team caps and goals as of 8 August 2019

Michael Davis (born 21 January 2002) is a Belgian professional footballer who plays as a centre-back for Dutch Eerste Divisie club VVV-Venlo.

== Club career ==
On 16 August 2022, Davis was loaned by Beveren to Antwerp for the 2022–23 season, with an option to buy. At Antwerp, he was assigned to the reserves squad Young Reds, which plays in the third-tier Belgian National Division 1. On 4 July 2023, he returned to Young Reds on a permanent basis and signed a two-year contract.

On 26 May 2025, Davis signed a one-season contract with VVV-Venlo in the Netherlands.
