= Layee Kromah =

Dutch footballer (born 2003)

Personal information
- Date of birth: 7 June 2003 (age 23)
- Place of birth: Amstelveen, Netherlands
- Height: 1.78 m (5 ft 10 in)
- Position: Winger

Youth career
- –2018: SDZ
- 2018–2020: ASV De Dijk
- 2020–2021: Almere City

Senior career*
Years	Team	Apps	(Gls)
2021–2024	Almere City	7	(0)
2023–2024	Jong Almere City	32	(7)
2024–2026	Jong Sparta	17	(6)
2024–2026	Sparta Rotterdam	0	(0)
2025–2026	→ VVV-Venlo (loan)	40	(4)
- * Club domestic league appearances and goals as of 28 April 2026

Layee Kromah (born 7 June 2003) is a Dutch professional footballer who plays as a winger.

== Career ==
Kromah began his football career in the youth setups of SDZ, ASV De Dijk and Almere City. From 2021, he was part of Almere City's under-21 squad. He made his first-team debut on 10 December 2021 in a 1–1 away draw in the Eerste Divisie against NAC Breda, coming on as a substitute for Jeffry Puriel in the 83rd minute.

In March 2022, Kromah signed his first professional contract with Almere City, alongside five other youth players, committing himself to the club until 2024. In June 2022, Kromah was voted Best Academy Player of the club for the 2021–22 season.

Following the expiry of his contract, he joined Jong Sparta on trial in July 2024. The trial proved successful, and he subsequently signed a contract with the club in August 2024.

In January 2025, Kromah was loaned to VVV-Venlo for eighteen months, with the deal including an option to buy; his contract at Sparta ran until mid-2026, with an option for a further year.

On 30 March 2026, Sparta gave formal notice to five players, Kromah among them, that their contracts would not be continued. VVV announced the following month that Kromah was one of five loan players leaving at the end of the 2025–26 season, and he became a free agent that summer.

== Career statistics ==
As of match played 24 April 2026

Appearances and goals by club, season and competition
Club	Season	League			National cup		Other		Total	
Club	Season	Division	Apps	Goals	Apps	Goals	Apps	Goals	Apps	Goals
Almere City	2021–22	Eerste Divisie	4	0	0	0	—		4	0
Almere City	2022–23	Eerste Divisie	3	0	0	0	0	0	3	0
Almere City	Total		7	0	0	0	0	0	7	0
Jong Almere City	2021–22	Tweede Divisie	32	7	—		—		32	7
Jong Sparta	2024–25	Tweede Divisie	17	6	—		0	0	17	6
VVV-Venlo (loan)	2024–25	Eerste Divisie	14	3	—		—		14	3
VVV-Venlo (loan)	2025–26	Eerste Divisie	26	1	1	0	—		27	1
VVV-Venlo (loan)	Total		40	4	1	0	—		41	4
Career total			96	17	1	0	0	0	97	17
