= Gabin Blancquart =

French footballer (born 2004)

Personal information
- Date of birth: 28 February 2004 (age 22)
- Place of birth: Leers, France
- Height: 1.92 m (6 ft 4 in)
- Position: Centre-back

Team information
- Current team: VVV-Venlo
- Number: 33

Youth career
- 2012–2019: Lille
- 2019–2021: Club Brugge
- 2021–2022: Valenciennes

Senior career*
Years	Team	Apps	(Gls)
2022–2024	Valenciennes II	46	(1)
2023–2024	Valenciennes	5	(0)
2024–	VVV-Venlo	59	(8)
- * Club domestic league appearances and goals as of 28 April 2026

Gabin Blancquart (born 28 February 2004) is a French professional footballer who plays as a centre-back for and captains Eerste Divisie club VVV-Venlo.

== Early life and youth career ==
Gabin Blancquart was born on 28 February 2004 in Leers, Nord. He has cited his older brother as a key influence on his early interest in football, having begun playing after repeatedly accompanying him to matches as a child. His evident talent led to his admission to the youth academy of Lille at the age of eight, where he spent several years developing within a structured and tactically focused environment.

At the age of 15, Blancquart moved abroad for the first time to join Club Brugge's youth setup. While the club provided institutional support to facilitate his adaptation, including schooling and daily transport, Blancquart later described the experience as challenging due to differences in footballing philosophy. He highlighted the contrast between the more tactical and technical approach in France and the greater emphasis on physicality in Belgian football. After one season, he decided to return to France, citing a lack of long-term confidence from the club despite the experience being formative.

== Club career ==
=== Valenciennes ===
In 2021, Blancquart joined Valenciennes. He initially featured for the club's reserve team, competing in National 3. He made his debut on 15 January 2022 in a 2–1 home defeat against US Maubeuge. On 20 October 2022, Blancquart scored his first official goal for the reserves in a 2–0 away victory over Iris Club de Croix.

During the 2023–24 Ligue 2 season, Blancquart made his competitive debut for Valenciennes' first team. On 16 December 2023, he started in a home match against Paris FC, which ended in a 1–0 defeat. He made five appearances for the first team in Ligue 2 under head coach Ahmed Kantari, with injuries in defence leading to his deployment at right-back.

==== VVV-Venlo ====
After leaving Valenciennes in June 2024, Blancquart joined Dutch second-tier Eerste Divisie club VVV-Venlo following a successful trial period in August 2024. He signed a two-year contract with an option for an additional season, reportedly on the recommendation of former teammate Nick Venema.

He made his competitive debut for the club on 20 September 2024, coming on as a substitute in the 61st minute for Diego van Zutphen in a 2–0 home defeat against Jong PSV. Blancquart subsequently established himself as a regular starter. During the 2024–25 season, he finished as the club's top scorer with five goals despite playing as a defender, and was voted VVV's Player of the Season by regional newspaper De Limburger.

Ahead of the 2025–26 season, Blancquart was appointed team captain by head coach John Lammers, succeeding Rick Ketting.

== Career statistics ==
As of match played 20 March 2026

Appearances and goals by club, season and competition
Club	Season	League			National cup		Other		Total	
Club	Season	Division	Apps	Goals	Apps	Goals	Apps	Goals	Apps	Goals
Valenciennes II	2021–22	National 3	6	0	—		—		6	0
Valenciennes II	2022–23	National 3	20	1	—		—		20	1
Valenciennes II	2023–24	National 3	20	0	—		—		20	0
Valenciennes II	Total		46	1	—		—		46	1
Valenciennes	2023–24	Ligue 2	5	0	0	0	—		5	0
VVV-Venlo	2024–25	Eerste Divisie	28	5	1	0	—		29	5
VVV-Venlo	2025–26	Eerste Divisie	27	3	1	0	—		28	3
VVV-Venlo	Total		55	8	2	0	—		57	8
Career total			106	9	2	0	0	0	108	9
