= Philip Heise =

German footballer

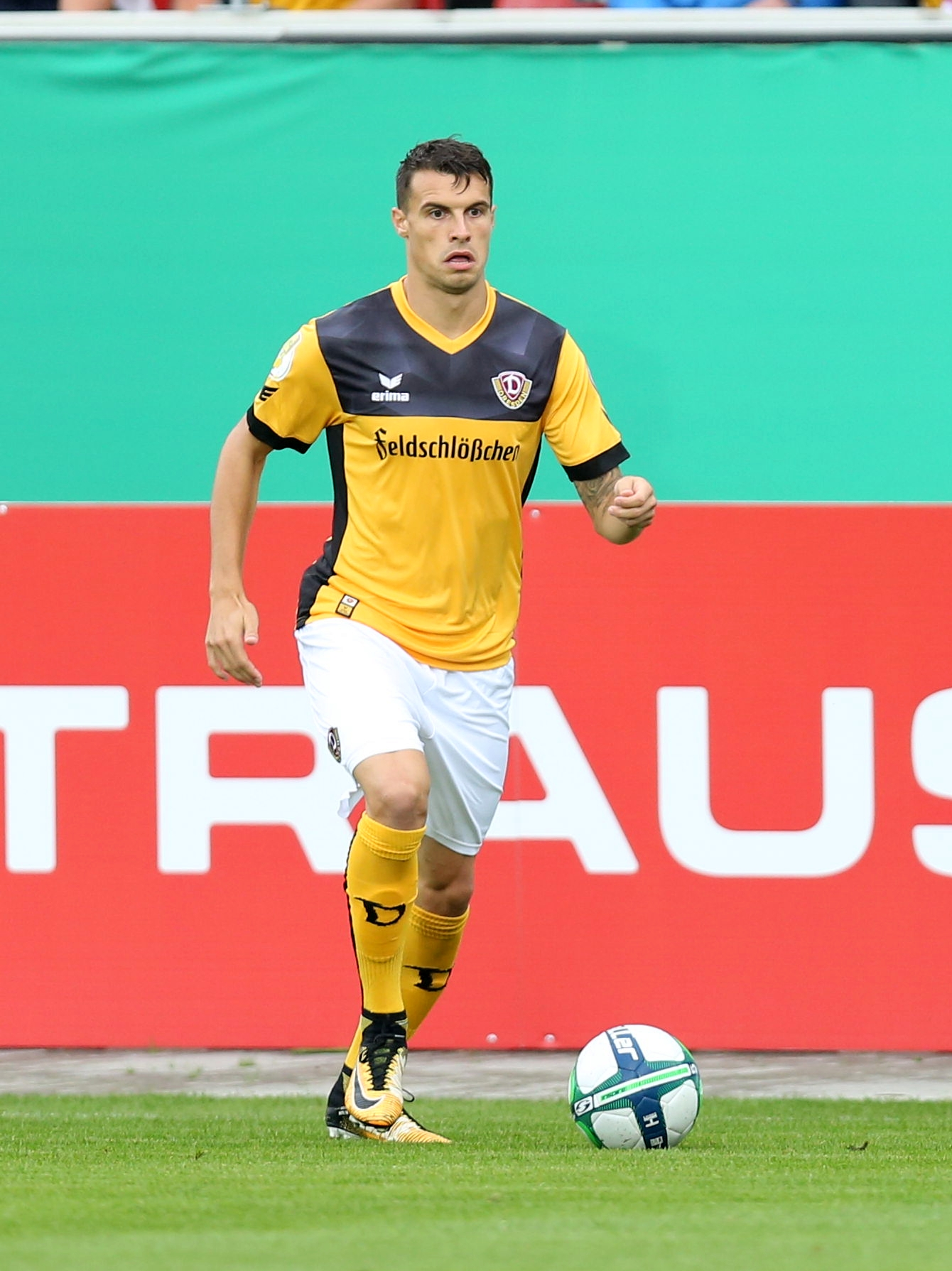
- Heise with Dynamo Dresden in 2017

Personal information
- Full name: Philip Michael Heise
- Date of birth: 20 June 1991 (age 35)
- Place of birth: Düsseldorf, Germany
- Height: 1.84 m (6 ft 0 in)
- Position: Left-back

Team information
- Current team: VVV-Venlo
- Number: 16

Youth career
- FC Büderich
- Bayer Leverkusen
- –2009: Fortuna Düsseldorf
- 2009–2010: Borussia Mönchengladbach

Senior career*
Years	Team	Apps	(Gls)
2010–2011	Fortuna Düsseldorf II	32	(2)
2011–2013	Preußen Münster	38	(2)
2013–2015	1. FC Heidenheim	68	(4)
2015–2017	VfB Stuttgart	6	(0)
2015–2016	VfB Stuttgart II	5	(0)
2017–2019	Dynamo Dresden	58	(5)
2019–2021	Norwich City	0	(0)
2020	→ 1. FC Nürnberg (loan)	11	(0)
2020–2021	→ Karlsruher SC (loan)	29	(1)
2021–2024	Karlsruher SC	89	(4)
2024–2025	Dynamo Dresden	21	(1)
2025–	VVV-Venlo	35	(4)
- * Club domestic league appearances and goals as of 09:51, 12 October 2026 (UTC)

Philip Michael Heise (born 20 June 1991) is a German professional footballer who plays as a left-back for Dutch Eerste Divisie club VVV-Venlo.

== Club career ==
Heise began his career with the second team at Fortuna Düsseldorf in the 2010–11 season. After two seasons at Preußen Münster he joined FC Heidenheim in the summer of 2013. For the 2015–16 season Heise moved to VfB Stuttgart. He joined Dynamo Dresden on 10 January 2017.

On 31 January 2019, Heise left Dynamo Dresden to join EFL Championship side Norwich City, who were promoted to the Premier League as champions at the end of the season. He made his debut for Norwich in an EFL Cup tie against Crawley Town on 27 August 2019.

On 4 January 2020, Heise joined 1. FC Nürnberg on loan for the rest of the 2019–20 season.

On 18 August 2020, he joined Karlsruher SC on loan.

On 12 July 2024, Heise returned to Dynamo Dresden.

On 1 August 2025, he signed a one-season contract with VVV-Venlo in the Netherlands.

== Career statistics ==
As of match played 9 November 2024

Appearances and goals by club, season and competition
Club	Season	League			National Cup (Note: Includes DFB-Pokal, FA Cup)		League Cup (Note: Includes EFL Cup)		Other		Total	
Club	Season	Division	Apps	Goals	Apps	Goals	Apps	Goals	Apps	Goals	Apps	Goals
Fortuna Düsseldorf II	2010-11	Regionalliga	32	2	—		—		—		32	2
Preußen Münster	2011-12	3. Liga	16	0	—		—		—		16	0
Preußen Münster	2012-13	3. Liga	21	1	1	0	—		—		22	1
Preußen Münster	Total		37	1	1	0	—		—		38	1
1. FC Heidenheim	2013-14	3. Liga	38	2	1	0	—		—		39	2
1. FC Heidenheim	2014-15	2. Bundesliga	30	2	2	0	—		—		32	2
1. FC Heidenheim	Total		68	4	3	0	—		—		71	4
VfB Stuttgart II	2015-16	3. Liga	5	0	—		—		—		5	0
VfB Stuttgart	2015-16	Bundesliga	5	0	1	0	—		—		6	0
VfB Stuttgart	2016-17	2. Bundesliga	1	0	1	0	—		—		2	0
VfB Stuttgart	Total		6	0	2	0	—		—		8	0
Dynamo Dresden	2016-17	2. Bundesliga	17	1	0	0	—		—		17	1
Dynamo Dresden	2017-18	2. Bundesliga	26	2	2	1	—		—		28	3
Dynamo Dresden	2018-19	2. Bundesliga	15	1	1	0	—		—		16	1
Dynamo Dresden	Total		58	5	3	1	—		—		61	6
Norwich City	2019-20	Premier League	0	0	0	0	1	0	—		1	0
Norwich City U21	2019-20	—			—		—		1 (Note: Appearance(s) in EFL Trophy)	0	1	0
1. FC Nürnberg (loan)	2019-20	2. Bundesliga	11	0	0	0	—		0	0	11	0
Karlsruher SC (loan)	2020-21	2. Bundesliga	29	1	1	0	—		—		30	1
Karlsruher SC	2021-22	2. Bundesliga	33	0	3	1	—		—		36	1
Karlsruher SC	2022-23	2. Bundesliga	32	3	2	0	—		—		34	3
Karlsruher SC	2023-24	2. Bundesliga	24	1	1	0	—		—		25	1
Karlsruher SC	Total		89	4	6	1	—		—		95	5
Dynamo Dresden	2024-25	3. Liga	14	1	2	0	—		—		16	1
Career total			349	17	18	2	1	0	1	0	369	19
