= 2026–27 Eerste Divisie =

Eerste Divisie
- Season: 2026–27
- Dates: 7 August 2026 – 14 May 2027
- Matches: 157
- Goals: 554 (3.53 per match)
- Top goalscorer: Jean-Paul N'Djoli; Henk Veerman (14 goals each)
- Biggest home win: Volendam 6–1 Dordrecht (28 August 2026); Heracles Almelo 5–0 De Graafschap (4 September 2026); Jong FC Utrecht 6–1 Jong Ajax (14 September 2026); RKC Waalwijk 6–1 MVV Maastricht (18 September 2026); Almere City 6–1 Helmond Sport (14 November 2026)
- Biggest away win: Jong FC Utrecht 1–6 Heracles Almelo (24 August 2026); Emmen 0–5 Den Bosch (1 November 2026)
- Highest scoring: Jong Ajax 4–6 Emmen (17 August 2026)
- Longest winning run: 6 matches Heracles Almelo
- Longest unbeaten run: 10 matches NAC Breda
- Longest winless run: 7 matches RKC Waalwijk; Eindhoven
- Longest losing run: 5 matches Eindhoven; Jong FC Utrecht; Dordrecht
- All statistics correct as of 21 November 2026.

The 2026–27 Eerste Divisie, also known as the Keuken Kampioen Divisie for sponsorship reasons, is the 71st season of the Eerste Divisie, the second tier of football in the Netherlands since its establishment in 1956.

== Clubs ==
A total of 20 clubs take part in the league: 17 from the 2025–26 Eerste Divisie and 3 relegated from the 2025–26 Eredivisie.

=== Clubs promoted and relegated ===
| ▲ to 2026–27 Eredivisie | ▼ from 2025–26 Eredivisie |
|---|---|
| ADO Den Haag; Cambuur; Willem II | Heracles Almelo; NAC Breda; Volendam |

Location of teams in the 2026–27 Eerste Divisie

=== Stadiums and locations ===
| Club | Location | Venue | Capacity |
|---|---|---|---|
| Almere City | Almere | Yanmar Stadion | 4,501 |
| De Graafschap | Doetinchem | Stadion De Vijverberg | 12,600 |
| Den Bosch | 's-Hertogenbosch | Stadion De Vliert | 8,713 |
| Dordrecht | Dordrecht | M-Scores Stadion | 4,235 |
| Eindhoven | Eindhoven | Jan Louwers Stadion | 4,600 |
| Emmen | Emmen | De Oude Meerdijk | 8,600 |
| Helmond Sport | Helmond | GS Staalwerken Stadion | 3,600 |
| Heracles Almelo | Almelo | Asito Stadion | 12,080 |
| Jong Ajax | Amsterdam | Sportpark De Toekomst | 2,250 |
| Jong AZ | Alkmaar | AFAS Trainingscomplex | 1,000 |
| Jong PSV | Eindhoven | PSV Campus De Herdgang | 2,500 |
| Jong FC Utrecht | Utrecht | Sportcomplex Zoudenbalch | 450 |
| MVV Maastricht | Maastricht | Stadion De Geusselt | 9,500 |
| NAC Breda | Breda | Rat Verlegh Stadion | 19,000 |
| RKC Waalwijk | Waalwijk | Mandemakers Stadion | 7,508 |
| Roda JC Kerkrade | Kerkrade | Parkstad Limburg Stadion | 19,979 |
| TOP Oss | Oss | Frans Heesenstadion | 4,560 |
| Vitesse | Arnhem | GelreDome | 21,248 |
| Volendam | Volendam | Kras Stadion | 7,384 |
| VVV-Venlo | Venlo | Covebo Stadion - De Koel | 8,000 |

=== Number of clubs by provinces ===
| Number of clubs | Province | Clubs |
|---|---|---|
| 7 | North Brabant | Den Bosch, Eindhoven, Helmond Sport, Jong PSV, NAC Breda, RKC Waalwijk, TOP Oss |
| 3 | Limburg | MVV Maastricht, Roda JC, VVV-Venlo |
| 3 | North Holland | Jong Ajax, Jong AZ, Volendam |
| 2 | Gelderland | De Graafschap, Vitesse |
| 1 | Drenthe | Emmen |
| 1 | Flevoland | Almere City |
| 1 | Overijssel | Heracles Almelo |
| 1 | South Holland | Dordrecht |
| 1 | Utrecht | Jong FC Utrecht |

== League table ==
| Pos | Team | Pld | W | D | L | GF | GA | GD | Pts | Promotion or qualification |
|---|---|---|---|---|---|---|---|---|---|---|
| 1 | Heracles Almelo (Note: Winner of the First Period (Rounds 1–10)) (X) | 16 | 13 | 2 | 1 | 48 | 17 | +31 | 41 | Promotion to the Eredivisie |
| 2 | Almere City | 16 | 10 | 1 | 5 | 37 | 19 | +18 | 31 | Promotion to the Eredivisie |
| 3 | NAC Breda | 16 | 9 | 4 | 3 | 33 | 23 | +10 | 31 | Qualification for promotion play-offs |
| 4 | VVV-Venlo | 16 | 9 | 2 | 5 | 38 | 25 | +13 | 29 | Qualification for promotion play-offs |
| 5 | Roda JC Kerkrade | 16 | 8 | 4 | 4 | 21 | 19 | +2 | 28 | Qualification for promotion play-offs |
| 6 | Emmen | 16 | 8 | 1 | 7 | 28 | 31 | −3 | 25 | Qualification for promotion play-offs |
| 7 | MVV Maastricht | 16 | 7 | 2 | 7 | 21 | 33 | −12 | 23 | Qualification for promotion play-offs |
| 8 | Volendam | 16 | 7 | 1 | 8 | 35 | 29 | +6 | 22 | Qualification for promotion play-offs |
| 9 | Den Bosch | 16 | 6 | 4 | 6 | 25 | 26 | −1 | 22 | |
| 10 | Jong AZ | 15 | 6 | 2 | 7 | 36 | 31 | +5 | 20 | Reserve teams are not eligible to be promoted to the Eredivisie |
| 11 | RKC Waalwijk | 16 | 4 | 8 | 4 | 29 | 23 | +6 | 20 | |
| 12 | TOP Oss | 16 | 6 | 2 | 8 | 23 | 24 | −1 | 20 | |
| 13 | Jong Ajax | 15 | 5 | 4 | 6 | 24 | 31 | −7 | 19 | Reserve teams are not eligible to be promoted to the Eredivisie |
| 14 | Vitesse | 15 | 5 | 3 | 7 | 18 | 23 | −5 | 18 | |
| 15 | De Graafschap | 15 | 5 | 3 | 7 | 21 | 29 | −8 | 18 | |
| 16 | Jong PSV | 15 | 4 | 5 | 6 | 19 | 24 | −5 | 17 | Reserve teams are not eligible to be promoted to the Eredivisie |
| 17 | Eindhoven | 16 | 5 | 2 | 9 | 23 | 34 | −11 | 17 | |
| 18 | Helmond Sport | 16 | 4 | 3 | 9 | 31 | 38 | −7 | 15 | |
| 19 | Jong FC Utrecht | 15 | 4 | 2 | 9 | 24 | 34 | −10 | 14 | Reserve teams are not eligible to be promoted to the Eredivisie |
| 20 | Dordrecht | 16 | 3 | 3 | 10 | 20 | 41 | −21 | 12 | |

Updated to match(es) played on 21 November 2026. Source: Flashscore, Keuken Kampioen Divisie (in Dutch)
Rules for classification: Season in progress: 1) Most points won; 2) Less points lost; 3) Goal difference; 4) Goals scored; 5) Head-to-head points; 6) Head-to-head goal difference; 7) Head-to-head goals scored 8) Head-to-head away goals scored 9) Alphabetical order; End of season: 1) Points; 2) Goal difference; 3) Goals scored; 4) Head-to-head points; 5) Head-to-head goal difference; 6) Head-to-head goals scored 7) Head-to-head away goals scored; 8) Extra match or series of matches 9) Goal difference (series of matches) 10) Goals scored (series of matches) 11) Penalty shoot-out (extra match or series of matches)
(X) Assured of at least promotion play-offs

== Results ==
| Home \ Away | ALM | DBO | DOR | EIN | EMM | GRA | HEL | HER | JAJ | JAZ | JPS | JUT | MVV | NAC | RKC | RJC | TOP | VIT | VOL | VVV |
|---|---|---|---|---|---|---|---|---|---|---|---|---|---|---|---|---|---|---|---|---|
| Almere City | | | | 3–0 | 16 Jan | | 6–1 | 1–0 | 0–1 | | 3–1 | 29 Jan | | 1–4 | | 2–3 | | 18 Dec | 1–0 | 11 Dec |
| Den Bosch | 1–1 | | 1–1 | 5–2 | | 8 Jan | 2–1 | | 4 Dec | | 5 Feb | 1–1 | 2–2 | | 23 Jan | | 2–1 | 1–4 | | 1–0 |
| Dordrecht | 3–2 | 18 Dec | | | 0–3 | | | 1–2 | 2–1 | 3–6 | | 15 Jan | 5 Feb | 0–0 | | 0–1 | | 27 Nov | | 2–4 |
| Eindhoven | 22 Jan | 29 Jan | 2–1 | | 3–1 | 2–2 | | 1–3 | 0–3 | 8 Jan | 1–2 | | 2–3 | | 3–2 | 6 Dec | | 0–1 | | |
| Emmen | 2–1 | 0–5 | | | | 1–2 | 28 Nov | | 29 Jan | 3–1 | 11 Dec | | 0–2 | 22 Jan | 9 Jan | 1–0 | 1–0 | | 5–3 | |
| De Graafschap | 1–4 | 1–0 | 11 Dec | 15 Jan | | | 29 Jan | 18 Dec | | 2–5 | | 2–1 | 3–0 | 1–2 | 1–1 | | 1–2 | | | |
| Helmond Sport | | | 5–1 | 3–2 | 5 Feb | 1–1 | | 2–2 | | 18 Dec | 3–1 | 4 Dec | | 0–2 | 1–1 | | 15 Jan | | 2–3 | 4–2 |
| Heracles Almelo | | 3–2 | | | 4 Dec | 5–0 | 22 Jan | | | 3–2 | 2–1 | | | 10 Jan | 3–0 | 5–1 | 2–0 | 2–0 | 11 Dec | 5 Feb |
| Jong Ajax | | | 11 Jan | | 4–6 | 2–1 | 3–2 | 27 Nov | | 23 Nov | | | 11 Dec | 8 Feb | 0–2 | 0–0 | | 1–1 | 25 Jan | 0–3 |
| Jong AZ | 1–3 | 0–1 | | 0–1 | | | 5–4 | 18 Jan | | | 25 Jan | 2–1 | 1–2 | 11 Dec | | 8 Feb | 27 Nov | | 4–1 | |
| Jong PSV | 11 Jan | 3–1 | 0–1 | 21 Dec | | 7 Dec | | | 1–1 | 1–1 | | 23 Nov | | 0–2 | | | 1–0 | 1 Feb | 3–2 | |
| Jong FC Utrecht | 27 Nov | | 3–2 | 0–0 | 1–0 | 25 Jan | | 1–6 | 6–1 | | | | 11 Jan | | 11 Dec | 1–2 | 8 Feb | 1–3 | | 1–3 |
| MVV Maastricht | 0–4 | 15 Jan | 4 Dec | | | | 2–0 | 1–5 | | | 27 Nov | 2–1 | | | 29 Jan | 1–1 | 18 Dec | 2–1 | 1–0 | 1–2 |
| NAC Breda | | 27 Nov | | 4–2 | 4–2 | | | 1–1 | 3–2 | | 15 Jan | 2–3 | 1–0 | | | 18 Dec | 29 Jan | | 6 Dec | 0–2 |
| RKC Waalwijk | 1–2 | 4–0 | 2–2 | | 1–1 | 5 Feb | | | 18 Dec | 4 Dec | 2–2 | | 6–1 | 4–2 | | 15 Jan | | | 1–1 | |
| Roda JC Kerkrade | | 11 Dec | 22 Jan | | | 29 Nov | 2–1 | 30 Jan | | 2–1 | 1–1 | | | 2–2 | 2–0 | | | 1–0 | 3–1 | 8 Jan |
| TOP Oss | 4 Dec | | 3–0 | 11 Dec | | | 3–1 | | 3–3 | | | 2–1 | 4–1 | 1–2 | 1–1 | 1–0 | | 10 Jan | | 22 Jan |
| Vitesse | 0–3 | | | 6 Feb | 0–2 | 23 Nov (Note: The match was scheduled to be played on 8 November 2026, but was postponed after De Graafschap fans blockaded the players’ bus before departure.) | 11 Dec | | 15 Jan | 0–3 | 3–1 | | 22 Jan | 2–2 | 1–1 | | 2–1 | | | 4 Dec |
| Volendam | 5 Feb | 2–0 | 6–1 | 29 Nov | 18 Dec | 1–2 | 8 Jan | | 1–2 | 29 Jan | | 6–2 | | | | | 3–0 | 2–0 | | 3–2 |
| VVV-Venlo | | | 29 Jan | 1–2 | 4–0 | 2–1 | | 3–4 | | 4–4 | 1–1 | 19 Dec | | | 27 Nov | 2–0 | 3–1 | | 15 Jan | |

Updated to match(es) played on 21 November 2026. Source: Flashscore
Legend: Blue = home team win; Yellow = draw; Red = away team win.

== Season statistics ==
=== Top scorers ===
| Rank | Player | Club | Goals |
|---|---|---|---|
| 1 | (France) Jean-Paul N'Djoli | Heracles Almelo | 14 |
| 1 | (Netherlands) Henk Veerman | Volendam | 14 |
| 3 | (Netherlands) Tristan van Gilst | Heracles Almelo | 12 |
| 4 | (Sweden) Jack Cooper-Love | Emmen | 11 |
| 4 | (Netherlands) Ferdy Druijf | Almere City | 11 |
| 6 | (Morocco) Naoufal Bannis | Vitesse | 10 |
| 7 | (Canada) Charles-Andreas Brym | NAC Breda | 9 |
| 7 | (Netherlands) Emre Ünüvar | Jong Ajax | 9 |
| 7 | (Curaçao) Anthony van den Hurk | Roda JC Kerkrade | 9 |
| 10 | (Italy) Diego Pugno | Jong Ajax | 7 |
| 10 | (France) Moussa Soumano | NAC Breda | 7 |
| 10 | (Netherlands) Freddy Quispel | Emmen | 7 |
