= VVV-Venlo =

Dutch professional football club

- Full name: Venlose Voetbal Vereniging Venlo
- Nicknames: The Good Old, Venlose Trots, Pride of the South, Yellow Black Army
- Short name: VVV
- Founded: 7 February 1903; 123 years ago
- Ground: Seacon Stadion – De Koel
- Capacity: 8,000
- Chairman: Jeroen Oehlen
- Head coach: Marinus Dijkhuizen
- League: Eerste Divisie
- 2025–26: Eerste Divisie, 13th of 20
- Website: vvv-venlo.nl
Home colours	Away colours

Venlose Voetbal Vereniging (Dutch pronunciation: [ˈvɛnloːzə ˈvudbɑl vəˈreːnəɣɪŋ]), commonly known as VVV-Venlo (Dutch pronunciation: [ˌveːveːˈveː ˈvɛnloː]) or simply as VVV, is a Dutch professional football club based in Venlo, Limburg. Founded in 1903, the club competes in the Eerste Divisie, the second tier of the Dutch football league system. VVV-Venlo have played multiple seasons in the top-flight Eredivisie, most recently between 2017 and 2021, and are among the oldest active football clubs in the Netherlands.

The club is based in the southeastern city of Venlo, near the German border, and hosts home matches at the 8,000-capacity De Koel, a stadium known for its unique sunken design and steep stands. The team traditionally plays in yellow shirts and black shorts and is nicknamed "The Good Old". Organised as a member-based association, the club maintains a strong regional identity and is active in community outreach, including the presentation of the Jan Klaassens Award and the hosting of the annual Herman & Wiel Teeuwen Memorial.

Historically, VVV-Venlo enjoyed periods of success in the 1950s and 1960s, winning the KNVB Cup in 1959 and reaching the final again in 1962. The club has spent over twenty seasons in the Eredivisie and has become known for developing talent and regularly returning to the top flight through promotion. Notable players to have worn the VVV shirt include Keisuke Honda, Bryan Linssen, and Ahmed Musa. While the club has not competed in European competitions, it maintains a reputation as a competitive and resilient side in Dutch football's upper tiers.

VVV-Venlo's fanbase draws from across North Limburg and the lower Meuse Valley, with strong local support rooted in regional pride. The club shares a local rivalry with MVV Maastricht, known as the Limburgse Derby, and has historically had competitive encounters with Roda JC and Fortuna Sittard.

== History ==
=== Foundation and first decades (1903–1952) ===
VVV originated from the association football club De Gouden Leeuw, which was founded by a group of friends in Venlo at the end of the nineteenth century. A few more name changes would occur, and the team was also known as Valuas for some time. Eventually, it was decided on 7 February 1903 to change the name to Venlose Voetbal Vereniging (VVV), the current name of the club. VVV wrote itself into the history books as one of the oldest clubs in Dutch professional football. In 1909, the clubs VITOS and THOR merged and became part of VVV. Quick followed in 1910.

During the first years of its existence, VVV could not enter the highest league of Dutch football. This was due to the fact that before the 1911–12 season, there was no first-tier Eerste Klasse in the southern Netherlands, but only Eastern and a Western Eerste Klasse. From the 1912–13 season, the South also competed in its own Eerste Klasse. VVV has been part of this since its introduction into Dutch football, with varying degrees of success. After the 1921–22 season, the club suffered relegation to the second-tier Tweede Klasse. Afterwards, the team played for some time in the Tweede Klasse, in which they won the championship during several seasons. They, however, failed to reach promotion to the Eerste Klasse again afterwards. After the end of World War II, the number of Eerste Klasse teams was expanded, which also included VVV. From 1948 to 1952, the club achieved fourth-place finishes in the Eerste Klasse.

=== Return to the Eredivisie (2006–2013) ===
VVV returned to the Eredivisie, the highest league in the Netherlands, by defeating RKC Waalwijk (3–0) in the promotion/relegation play-offs in the 2006–07 season. After one season in the Eredivisie, VVV-Venlo were relegated back to the Eerste Divisie. After a single season, VVV-Venlo won the 2008–09 Eerste Divisie title and returned to the Eredivisie.

In the 2009–10 season, the team booked its best league result since 1988 after finishing 12th in the Eredivisie. Another remarkable event was the transfer of star player Keisuke Honda to CSKA Moscow. They also signed toddler Baerke van der Meij on a symbolic ten-year contract, after a video featuring him scoring a hat trick into a toy box became popular. Honda was replaced by Gonzalo and the club signed Japanese player Maya Yoshida. The departure of Honda turned out to be a key point in the club's season. In the second half of the season, the team was not able to win matches and barely escaped from relegation.

At the end of the season, key players Ruben Schaken and Adil Auassar both signed with Feyenoord on a free transfer. Gonzalo returned to his employer Groningen, while Sandro Calabro signed with Swiss side St. Gallen. The club contracted Ruud Boymans and the Nigerian Ahmed Musa to strengthen the squad for the 2010–11 season. They avoided relegation, but it was a harsh season in which Jan van Dijk was fired and former international Patrick Paauwe terminated his contract after losing the competition from his competitors.

Belgian manager Glen De Boeck was signed for the next season, but failed to improve the results. As a result of that, he resigned in December 2011. Ton Lokhoff was recruited as the new manager and succeeded in avoiding relegation by winning the post-season play-offs. However, in the 2012–13 season, the club was relegated after losing the promotion/relegation play-offs against Go Ahead Eagles. The club finished fifth in its first Eerste Divisie season since its promotion in 2009. But again, the club bounced back and returned to the Eredivisie in 2017, after clinching promotion by defeating RKC Waalwijk. The club finished 15th and secured survival without the need for play-offs. In the following 2018–19 season, VVV improved its league position, finishing 12th.

=== Resurgence, relegation and financial restructuring (2017–present) ===
In the summer of 2019, head coach Maurice Steijn left the club after five years in charge to take up a position in the United Arab Emirates. He was replaced by Robert Maaskant, whose tenure proved short-lived; after seven consecutive league defeats, he was dismissed in November 2019. Former player Jay Driessen served as interim head coach until the winter break, after which Hans de Koning was appointed on 1 January 2020. De Koning managed to lift VVV out of the relegation zone, ensuring the club's continued presence in the Eredivisie for the 2020–21 season.

During De Koning's tenure, VVV suffered a record-breaking 13–0 away defeat to Ajax on matchday six of the 2020–21 season, the heaviest loss in Eredivisie history. Following a run of seven consecutive defeats, De Koning was dismissed and replaced by Jos Luhukay on 17 March 2021. Luhukay was unable to prevent relegation, which was confirmed after a 3–1 away loss to Ajax on 13 May 2021. Despite relegation, the season included several notable achievements. Greek striker Giorgos Giakoumakis scored 26 league goals, becoming the first player in the club's history to finish as Eredivisie top goalscorer. VVV also reached the semi-finals of the 2020–21 KNVB Cup, their best cup performance since 1988.

Following relegation, VVV struggled to re-establish themselves in the Eerste Divisie. Although the club qualified for the promotion play-offs in 2023, they were eliminated in the semi-finals after a penalty shoot-out defeat to eventual promotees Almere City. Shortly thereafter, it emerged that the club was facing significant financial difficulties, leading to a scaling back of sporting ambitions and delaying plans for a swift return to the top flight. In August 2023, VVV initiated a WHOA (Dutch Act on Court Confirmation of Extrajudicial Restructuring Plans) procedure in an effort to restructure its debts and ensure financial continuity. On 1 February 2024, the District Court of Limburg approved the restructuring plan and the associated creditor agreement. The ruling relieved the club of a substantial portion of its outstanding debt, safeguarding its future.

== Japanese players ==
Since Keisuke Honda transferred from Nagoya Grampus in 2008, a slew of Japanese players have played at VVV-Venlo, including Maya Yoshida, Robert Cullen and Yuki Otsu. Sef Vergoossen, a legendary manager of the club, and Japanese agent Tetsuro Kiyooka were a bridge between the Japanese players and the club.

== Community support ==
The official club mascot since 1 July 2004 is a dog named "Koelie" (English: Coolie).

The Jan Klaassens Museum, set up in 2003 is located in the city center of Venlo and is operated by the Limburgs Museum. Since 2005, VVV has annually presented the Jan Klaassens Award to the greatest talent from its own youth academy.

The Herman Teeuwen Memorial, named after the club icon who died suddenly in 2003, since 2004 has been organised by the club, usually with well-known foreign clubs participating on an invitational basis.

VVV announced in July 2015 that they would be retiring the number 28 shirt in memory of youth player Beau Vilters, who had previously worn that number but was killed in a traffic accident on 14 June 2015, at the age of 18.

In April 2011, after a viral video of a local toddler, Baerke van der Meij, grandson of VVV player Jan van der Meij, showing him scoring a hat trick into his toy box, the club gave the 18-month-old an honorary contract.

== Stadium ==
VVV-Venlo currently play at De Koel in Venlo. The stadium holds 8,000 people and was built in 1972. It is named after its main sponsor, hence its current name, Covebo Stadion De Koel.

== Players ==
=== Current squad ===
As of 6 September 2026

Note: Flags indicate national team as defined under FIFA eligibility rules; some limited exceptions apply. Players may hold more than one non-FIFA nationality.

No.	Pos.	Nation	Player
1	GK	CUW	Trevor Doornbusch
4	DF	IRL	Éanna Clancy
5	DF	NED	Lars de Blok
6	DF	BEL	Andreas Verstraeten (on loan from Antwerp)
7	MF	ALG	Edhy Zuliani
8	MF	MAR	Ismail Oulad M'Hand
9	FW	GRE	Matheos Tsigkas (on loan from VfB Stuttgart II)
10	MF	NED	Alex Schalk
11	FW	MAR	Nassim Ait Mouhou
13	GK	NED	Youri Schoonderwaldt
14	MF	NED	Raf Vullers
15	DF	NED	Tijn Joosten

No.	Pos.	Nation	Player
16	DF	GER	Philip Heise
17	FW	GER	Gino Schmidt
19	FW	NED	Thomas Janssen
21	DF	GER	Luis Görlich
22	GK	NED	Zidane Taylan
24	MF	NED	Mohammed Odriss
31	DF	BEL	Michael Davis
33	DF	FRA	Gabin Blancquart
34	MF	NED	Amir Rais
35	DF	NED	Yousri El Anbri
38	MF	NED	Tristan Schenkhuizen
43	FW	NED	Devy Hendrikx

=== Youth players in use ===
Note: Flags indicate national team as defined under FIFA eligibility rules; some limited exceptions apply. Players may hold more than one non-FIFA nationality.

No.	Pos.	Nation	Player
—	DF	NED	Finn van der Sterren
—	MF	NED	Jari Horsten

No.	Pos.	Nation	Player
—	FW	NED	Maarten van Grootel

=== Retired numbers ===
28 — (Netherlands) Beau Vilters, defender (2014–15) — posthumous honour

== Club staff ==
Position	Staff
Head coach	(Netherlands) Peter Uneken
Assistant coach	(Netherlands) Joeri Janssen
First-team coach	(Netherlands) Ivo Rossen
Goalkeeper coach	(Netherlands) Ronnie Buitenkamp
Team Doctor	(Netherlands) Rolf Timmermans
Physiotherapist	(Netherlands) Bram Smeets (Netherlands) Manon Peeters (Netherlands) Falk Louwers
Team Official	(Netherlands) Harrold Kerren
Manager	(Netherlands) Roel Engelen
Technical director	(Netherlands) Teun Jacobs

== Coaching history ==
Years	Name	Nat.
1954–56	Ferdi Silz	(Germany)
1956–60	Wilhelm Kment	(Austria)
1961–63	Ferdi Silz	(Germany)
1964–65	Josef Gesell	(Germany)
1968–69	Bas Paauwe	(Netherlands)
1970–72	Thomas van der Velde	(Belgium)
1972–78	Rob Baan	(Netherlands)
1978–79	Hans Croon	(Indonesia)
1979	Sef Vergoossen (a.i.)	(Netherlands)
1979–81	Jan Morsing	(Netherlands)
1981–86	Sef Vergoossen	(Netherlands)
1986–88	Jan Reker	(Netherlands)
1989	Sef Vergoossen (a.i.)	(Netherlands)

Years	Name	Nat.
1992–94	Frans Körver	(Netherlands)
1995–96	Jan Versleijen	(Netherlands)
1996	Joop Brand (a.i.)	(Netherlands)
1996–98	Henk van Stee	(Netherlands)
1998–2000	Hennie Spijkerman	(Netherlands)
2000–01	Jan Versleijen	(Netherlands)
2001–04	Wim Dusseldorp	(Netherlands)
2004–05	Adrie Koster	(Netherlands)
2005–06	Herbert Neumann	(Germany)
2006–08	André Wetzel	(Netherlands)
2008–10	Jan van Dijk	(Netherlands)
2010–11	Willy Boessen (a.i.)	(Netherlands)
2011	Glen De Boeck	(Belgium)

Years	Name	Nat.
2011	Willy Boessen (a.i.)	(Netherlands)
2012–13	Ton Lokhoff	(Netherlands)
2013–14	René Trost	(Netherlands)
2014–19	Maurice Steijn	(Netherlands)
2019	Robert Maaskant	(Netherlands)
2019	Jay Driessen (a.i.)	(Netherlands)
2019–2021	Hans de Koning	(Netherlands)
2021–2022	Jos Luhukay	(Netherlands)
2022–2024	Rick Kruys	(Netherlands)
2024–2025	John Lammers	(Netherlands)
2025–present	Peter Uneken	(Netherlands)

== National team players ==
The following players were called up to represent their national teams in international football and received caps during their tenure with VVV-Venlo:

- **Aruba**
  - (Aruba) Joshua John (2020–2021)
- **Bonaire**
  - (Bonaire) Gio-Renys Felicia (2024)
- **Curaçao**
  - (Curaçao) **Trevor Doornbusch (2025–present)**
- **Finland**
  - (Finland) Niki Mäenpää (2012–2015)
- **Greece**
  - (Greece) Giorgos Giakoumakis (2020–2021)
- **Japan**
  - (Japan) Keisuke Honda (2008–2009)
  - (Japan) Yūki Ōtsu (2012–2015)
  - (Japan) Maya Yoshida (2010–2012)
- **Latvia**
  - (Latvia) Vitālijs Maksimenko (2014–2015)
- **Netherlands**
  - (Netherlands) Jan Klaassens (1948–1959; 1964–1967)
  - (Netherlands) Coy Koopal (1954–1956)
  - (Netherlands) Faas Wilkes (1956–1958)
- **Nigeria**
  - (Nigeria) Ahmed Musa (2010–2012)
  - (Nigeria) Uche Nwofor (2011–2014)
- **Slovenia**
  - (Slovenia) Aleksandar Radosavljević (2012–2013)
- **Togo**
  - (Togo) Peniel Mlapa (2018–2019)

- Players in bold actively play for VVV-Venlo and for their respective national teams. Years in brackets indicate careerspan with VVV-Venlo.

=== National team players by Confederation ===
Member associations are listed in order of most to least amount of current and former VVV-Venlo players represented Internationally

Total national team players by confederation
Confederation	Total	(Nation) Association
AFC	3	Japan (3)
CAF	3	Nigeria (2), Togo (1)
CONCACAF	3	Aruba (1), Bonaire (1), Curaçao (1)
CONMEBOL	0	
OFC	0	
UEFA	7	Netherlands (3), Finland (1), Greece (1), Latvia (1), Slovenia (1)

== Players in international tournaments ==
The following is a list of VVV-Venlo players who have competed in international tournaments, including the FIFA World Cup and the AFC Asian Cup. To this date no VVV-Venlo players have participated in the UEFA European Championship, Africa Cup of Nations, Copa América, CONCACAF Gold Cup or the OFC Nations Cup while playing for VVV-Venlo.

Cup	Players
(Qatar) 2011 AFC Asian Cup	(Japan) Maya Yoshida
(Canada) (Mexico) (United States) 2026 FIFA World Cup	(Curaçao) Trevor Doornbusch

== Honours ==
KNVB Cup (Dutch Cup): 1958-59
Eerste Divisie (Dutch Second Tier): 1992–93, 2008–09, 2016–17

== Domestic results ==
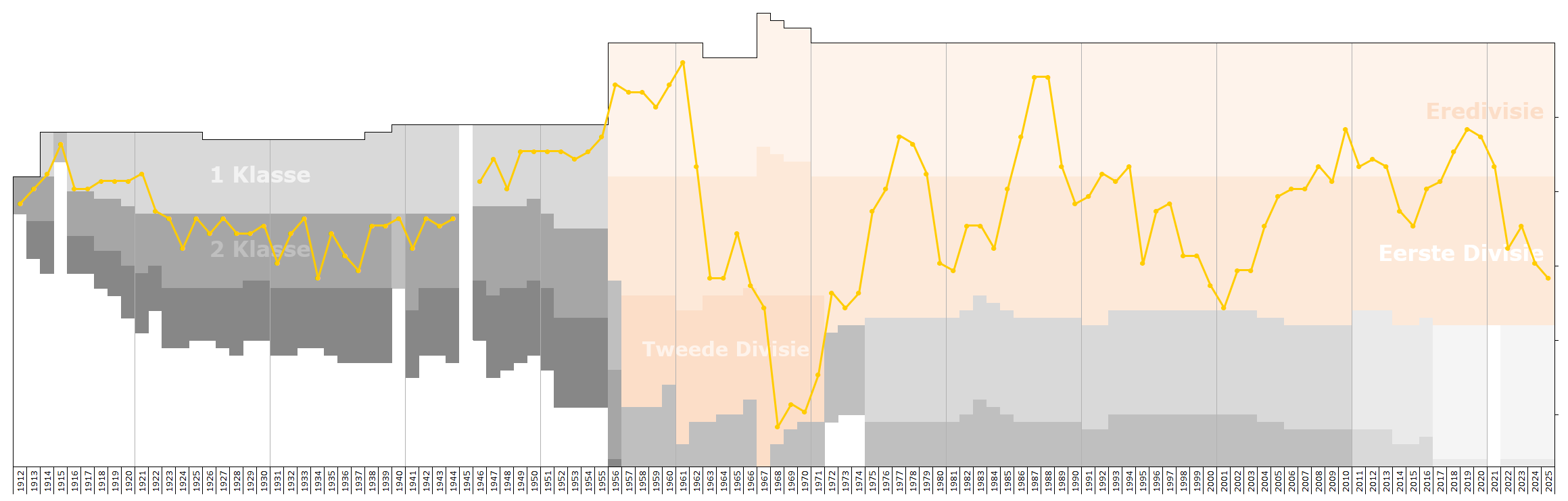
Historical chart of league performance

Below is a table with VVV-Venlo's domestic results since the introduction of the Eredivisie in 1956.

Domestic Results since 1956
Domestic league	League result	Qualification to		KNVB Cup season	Cup result
2024–25 Eerste Divisie	14th	–		2024–25	first round
2023–24 Eerste Divisie	12th	–		2023–24	first round
2022–23 Eerste Divisie	7th	promotion/relegation play-offs: no promotion		2022–23	second round
2021–22 Eerste Divisie	10th	–		2021–22	first round
2020–21 Eredivisie	17th	Eerste Divisie (relegation)		2020–21	semi-final
2019–20 Eredivisie	13th	–		2019–20	first round
2018–19 Eredivisie	12th	–		2018–19	second round
2017–18 Eredivisie	15th	–		2017–18	round of 16
2016–17 Eerste Divisie	1st	Eredivisie (promotion)		2016–17	second round
2015–16 Eerste Divisie	2nd	promotion/relegation play-offs: no promotion		2015–16	second round
2014–15 Eerste Divisie	7th	promotion/relegation play-offs: no promotion		2014–15	round of 16
2013–14 Eerste Divisie	5th	promotion/relegation play-offs: no promotion		2013–14	third round
2012–13 Eredivisie	17th	Eerste Divisie (losing promo./releg. play-offs)		2012–13	second round
2011–12 Eredivisie	16th	– (surviving promotion/relegation play-offs)		2011–12	second round
2010–11 Eredivisie	17th	– (surviving promotion/relegation play-offs)		2010–11	third round
2009–10 Eredivisie	12th	–		2009–10	third round
2008–09 Eerste Divisie	1st	Eredivisie (promotion)		2008–09	second round
2007–08 Eredivisie	17th	Eerste Divisie (losing promo./releg. play-offs)		2007–08	second round
2006–07 Eerste Divisie	2nd	Eredivisie (winning promotion/releg. play-offs)		2006–07	second round
2005–06 Eerste Divisie	2nd	promotion/relegation play-offs: no promotion		2005–06	round of 16
2004–05 Eerste Divisie	3rd	promotion/relegation play-offs: no promotion		2004–05	second round
2003–04 Eerste Divisie	7th	promotion/relegation play-offs: no promotion		2003–04	second round
2002–03 Eerste Divisie	13th	–		2002–03	third round
2001–02 Eerste Divisie	13th	–		2001–02	third round
2000–01 Eerste Divisie	18th	–		2000–01	round of 16
1999–2000 Eerste Divisie	15th	–		1999–2000	group stage
1998–99 Eerste Divisie	11th	–		1998–99	second round
1997–98 Eerste Divisie	11th	–		1997–98	group stage
1996–97 Eerste Divisie	4th	promotion/relegation play-offs: no promotion		1996–97	second round
1995–96 Eerste Divisie	5th	promotion/relegation play-offs: no promotion		1995–96	quarter final
1994–95 Eerste Divisie	12th	promotion/relegation play-offs: no promotion		1994–95	second round
1993–94 Eredivisie	17th	Eerste Divisie (relegation)		1993–94	third round
1992–93 Eerste Divisie	1st	Eredivisie (promotion)		1992–93	third round
1991–92 Eredivisie	18th	Eerste Divisie (relegation)		1991–92	quarter final
1990–91 Eerste Divisie	3rd	Eredivisie (winning promotion/releg. play-offs)		1990–91	second round
1989–90 Eerste Divisie	4th	–		1989–90	second round
1988–89 Eredivisie	17th	Eerste Divisie (relegation)		1988–89	second round
1987–88 Eredivisie	5th	– (losing UC play-offs)		1987–88	semi-final
1986–87 Eredivisie	5th	– (losing UC play-offs)		1986–87	round of 16
1985–86 Eredivisie	13th	–		1985–86	first round
1984–85 Eerste Divisie	2nd	Eredivisie (promotion)		1984–85	second round
1983–84 Eerste Divisie	10th	promotion/relegation play-offs: no promotion		1983–84	second round
1982–83 Eerste Divisie	7th	promotion/relegation play-offs: no promotion		1982–83	round of 16
1981–82 Eerste Divisie	7th	promotion/relegation play-offs: no promotion		1981–82	second round
1980–81 Eerste Divisie	13th	–		1980–81	round of 16
1979–80 Eerste Divisie	12th	–		1979–80	first round
1978–79 Eredivisie	18th	Eerste Divisie (relegation)		1978–79	second round
1977–78 Eredivisie	14th	–		1977–78	second round
1976–77 Eredivisie	13th	–		1976–77	second round
1975–76 Eerste Divisie	2nd	Eredivisie (winning promotion/releg. play-offs)		1975–76	second round
1974–75 Eerste Divisie	5th	–		1974–75	second round
1973–74 Eerste Divisie	16th	–		1973–74	second round
1972–73 Eerste Divisie	18th	–		1972–73	second round
1971–72 Eerste Divisie	16th	–		1971–72	first round
1970–71 Tweede Divisie	11th	Eerste Divisie (promotion)		1970–71	first round
1969–70 Tweede Divisie	16th	–		1969–70	first round
1968–69 Tweede Divisie	15th	–		1968–69	first round
1967–68 Eerste Divisie	18th	Tweede Divisie (relegation)		1967–68	group stage
1966–67 Tweede Divisie	2nd	Eerste Divisie (promotion)		1966–67	DNC
1965–66 Eerste Divisie	15th	Tweede Divisie (relegation)		1965–66	group stage
1964–65 Eerste Divisie	8th	–		1964–65	second round
1963–64 Eerste Divisie	14th	–		1963–64	second round
1962–63 Eerste Divisie	14th	–		1962–63	round of 16
1961–62 Eredivisie	17th	Eerste Divisie (relegation)		1961–62	?
1960–61 Eredivisie	3rd	–		1960–61	?
1959–60 Eredivisie	6th	–		not held	not held
1958–59 Eredivisie	10th	–		1958–59	winners
1957–58 Eredivisie	7th	–	1957–58	?	
1956–57 Eredivisie	7th	–	1956–57	?	
