= 2024–25 VVV-Venlo season =

VVV-Venlo
2024–25 season
- Stadium: De Koel
- Eerste Divisie: 14th
- KNVB Cup: 1st round
- Top goalscorer: League: Gabin Blancquart (5 goals); All: Gabin Blancquart (5 goals)
- Highest home attendance: 6,242 (38th week)
- Lowest home attendance: 4,077 (22nd week)
- Average home league attendance: 5,066
- Biggest win: 4-1 (SBV Vitesse (a) 21st week Roda JC Kerkrade (a) 31st week FC Eindhoven (h) 3th week)
- Biggest defeat: 5-0 SC Cambuur (a) 27th week & 7-2 ADO Den Haag (h) 38th week

The 2024–25 season represented the 122nd year in the history of VVV-Venlo. It was the club's 41st campaign in the Eerste Divisie and their fourth consecutive season in the second level of Dutch football.

In addition to their league commitments, VVV-Venlo took part in the KNVB Cup. Their cup run ended in the first round after a 2–1 defeat to Excelsior Rotterdam.

VVV-Venlo ended the Eerste Divisie campaign in 14th position.

Gabin Blancquart was the club's joint leading scorer during the season, scoring five goals in all competitions.

Elias Sierra made more appearances than any other VVV-Venlo player, featuring in 35 matches across all competitions. Of those, 34 came in the Eerste Divisie, while he also made one appearance in the KNVB Cup.

== Players ==
=== First-team squad ===
As of 12 March 2025

Note: Flags indicate national team as defined under FIFA eligibility rules; some limited exceptions apply. Players may hold more than one non-FIFA nationality.

No.	Pos.	Nation	Player
1	GK	NED	Jan de Boer
2	DF	NED	Robin Lathouwers
3	DF	NED	Roel Janssen
4	DF	NED	Rick Ketting
5	DF	NED	Simon Janssen
6	MF	NED	Joep Kluskens
7	MF	GER	Lasse Wehmeyer
8	MF	BEL	Elias Sierra
9	FW	NED	Dean Zandbergen
9	MF	GRE	Konstantinos Doumtsios
10	FW	NED	Brahim Darri
10	MF	GER	Paul Pöpperl
11	FW	NED	Thijme Verheijen
12	DF	NED	Sylian Mokono
14	FW	SUR	Yahcuroo Roemer
33	DF	FRA	Gabin Blancquart
34	DF	NED	Serano Seymor
35	MF	NED	Yousri El Anbri
37	DF	NED	Diego van Zutphen

No.	Pos.	Nation	Player
45	MF	NED	Sven Janssen
46	DF	NED	Jens Jenniskens
96	MF	MAR	Driess Saddiki
16	GK	CUW	Trevor Doornbusch
17	FW	NED	Martijn Berden
18	FW	NED	Bjorn van Zijl
18	FW	NED	Pepijn Doesburg
19	DF	GER	Emmanuel Gyamfi
21	MF	NED	Max de Waal
23	GK	NED	Delano van Crooij
24	MF	NED	Mohammed Odriss
25	MF	NED	Navarone Foor
26	FW	NED	Naïm Matoug
27	FW	NED	Layee Kromah
27	DF	NED	Tijn Joosten
29	MF	NED	Tim Braem
30	FW	NED	Resley Kessels
30	FW	NED	Sam Sow
32	MF	NED	Youssef Mephtah

== Transfers ==
=== In ===
Pos.	Player	Transferred from	Fee	Date
FW	(Greece) Konstantinos Doumtsios	(Netherlands) TOP Oss	Free	1 July 2024
FW	(Germany) Lasse Wehmeyer	(Netherlands) Heracles Almelo		1 July 2024
DF	(Germany) Emmanuel Gyamfi	(Germany) FC Schalke 04	On loan	2 July 2024
MF	(Germany) Paul Pöpperl	(Germany) FC Schalke 04	On loan	2 July 2024
FW	(Suriname) Yahcuroo Roemer	(Romania) FC Voluntari	Free	13 August 2024
DF	(France) Gabin Blancquart	(Netherlands) Valenciennes B	Free	23 August 2024
MF	(Netherlands) Max de Waal	(Netherlands) Willem II Tilburg	On loan	2 September 2024
DF	(Netherlands) Sylian Mokono	No club		7 November 2024
FW	(Netherlands) Brahim Darri	(Netherlands) FC Dordrecht	Free	9 January 2025
FW	(Netherlands) Layee Kromah	(Netherlands) Jong Sparta	On loan	28 January 2025
MF	(Netherlands) Navarone Foor	No club		31 January 2025
FW	(Netherlands) Dean Zandbergen	(Netherlands) FC Dordrecht		4 February 2025
DF	(Netherlands) Serano Seymor	(Netherlands) Excelsior Rotterdam	On loan	4 February 2025
GK	(Curaçao) Trevor Doornbusch	No club		27 February 2025
DF	(Morocco) Driess Saddiki	No club		12 March 2025

=== Out ===
Pos.	Player	Transferred to	Fee	Date
FW	(Denmark) Magnus Kaastrup	(Denmark) Lyngby Boldklub	End of loan	30 June 2024
FW	(Greece) Michalis Kosidis	(Greece) AEK Athens B	End of loan	30 June 2024
FW	(Belgium) Milan Robberechts	(Netherlands) Fortuna Sittard	End of loan	30 June 2024
MF	(Netherlands) Levi Smans	(Netherlands) SC Heerenveen	€350,000	1 July 2024
MF	(Netherlands) Robert Klaasen	No club		1 July 2024
MF	(Czech Republic) Richard Sedláček	(Czech Republic) FK Teplice	Free	27 August 2024
FW	(Suriname) Yahcuroo Roemer	(Belgium) Esperanza Pelt	Free	1 January 2025
MF	(Germany) Paul Pöpperl	(Germany) FC Schalke 04	End of loan	2 January 2025
FW	(Netherlands) Pepijn Doesburg	(Slovakia) AS Trenčín		25 January 2025
FW	(Greece) Konstantinos Doumtsios	(Netherlands) FC Den Bosch		3 February 2025
GK	(Netherlands) Jan de Boer	(Norway) Bryne FK		5 February 2025

== Competitions ==
=== Overall record ===
Competition	First match	Last match	Starting round	Final position	Record							
Competition	First match	Last match	Starting round	Final position	Pld	W	D	L	GF	GA	GD	Win %
Eerste Divisie	10 August 2024	9 May 2025	Week 1	14th	38	11	8	19	44	69	−25	28.95
KNVB Cup	29 October 2024	29 October 2024	1st round	1st round	1	0	0	1	1	2	−1	0.00
Total					39	11	8	20	45	71	−26	28.21

Last updated: 9 May 2025
Source: ESPN

=== Eerste Divisie ===
==== League table ====
Pos	Team	Pld	W	D	L	GF	GA	GD	Pts
12	Roda JC Kerkrade	38	13	10	15	49	57	−8	49
13	Helmond Sport	38	12	10	16	52	60	−8	46
14	VVV-Venlo	38	11	8	19	43	69	−26	41
15	MVV Maastricht	38	10	10	18	52	59	−7	40
16	TOP Oss	38	8	14	16	31	60	−29	38

Source: Flashscore, Keuken Kampioen Divisie (in Dutch)
Rules for classification: Season in progress: 1) Most points won; 2) Less points lost; 3) Goal difference; 4) Goals scored; 5) Alphabetical order; End of season: 1) Points; 2) Goal difference; 3) Goals scored; 4) Head-to-head points; 5) Head-to-head goal difference; 6) Head-to-head away goals scored; 7) Play-off if relevant for deciding champion, relegation or participating in a European league, otherwise by draw. 8) Penalty shoot-out (only after a play-off)

==== Results summary ====
Overall								Home						Away					
Pld	W	D	L	GF	GA	GD	Pts	W	D	L	GF	GA	GD	W	D	L	GF	GA	GD
38	11	8	19	44	69	−25	41	5	5	9	22	30	−8	6	3	10	22	39	−17

Last updated: 9 May 2025.
Source: https://www.espn.nl/voetbal/team/statistieken/_/id/3731/competitie/NED.2/season/2024/

==== Results by round ====
Round	1	2	3	4	5	6	7	8	9	10	11	12	13	14	15	16	17	18	19	20	21	22	23	24	25	26	27	28	29	30	31	32	33	34	35	36	37	38
Ground	A	H	H	A	H	A	H	A	H	A	H	H	A	H	A	H	A	H	A	H	A	H	A	A	H	H	A	H	A	H	A	A	A	H	A	H	A	H
Result	D	L	D	L	W	L	L	W	L	L	L	L	W	L	L	L	L	D	W	D	W	W	W	L	D	L	L	W	L	D	W	D	L	W	D	W	L	L
Position																																						14

A = Away; H = Home; W = Win; D = Draw; L = Loss

=== Matches ===
==== 1st half ====
10 August 2024 1st week	ADO Den Haag	1–1	VVV-Venlo	The Hague
16:30	Daryl van Mieghem 38'	Report	Konstantinos Doumtsios 69'	Stadium: Bingoal Stadion; Attendance: 5,758; Referee: Ingmar Oostrom

16 August 2024 2nd week	VVV-Venlo	0–1	SBV Vitesse	Venlo
20:00		Report	Miliano Jonathans 53'	Stadium: De Koel; Attendance: 5,564; Referee: Robin Vereijken

25 August 2024 3rd week	VVV-Venlo	1–1	Roda JC Kerkrade	Venlo
16:45	Tim Braem 10'	Report	Jay Kruiver 90+7'	Stadium: De Koel; Attendance: 5,202; Referee: Martijn Vos

30 August 2024 4th week	Helmond Sport	3–0	VVV-Venlo	Helmond
20:00	Lennerd Daneels 27'; Anthony van den Hurk 71'; Jonas Scholz 90+1'	Report		Stadium: Stadion De Braak; Attendance: 2,034; Referee: Luuk Timmer

13 September 2024 5th week	VVV-Venlo	3–2	Jong FC Utrecht	Venlo
20:00	Konstantinos Doumtsios 5'; Pepijn Doesburg 70' 76'	Report	Adrian Blake 40'; Rafik El Arguioui 49'	Stadium: De Koel; Attendance: 4,949; Referee: Rick Sturm

16 September 2024 6th week	Excelsior Rotterdam	4–0	VVV-Venlo	Rotterdam
20:00	Jacky Donkor 6'; Richie Omorowa 17' 22' (pen.); José de Almeida Reis 85'	Report		Stadium: Stadion Woudestein; Attendance: 2,744; Referee: Jeroen Manschot

20 September 2024 7th week	VVV-Venlo	0–2	Jong PSV	Venlo
20:00		Report	Tai Abed 23'; Tygo Land 90+1'	Stadium: De Koel; Attendance: 4,509; Referee: Thomas Hardeman

27 September 2024 8th week	FC Volendam	2–4	VVV-Venlo	Volendam
20:00	Henk Veerman 78'; Daniël Beukers 89'	Report	Martijn Berden 33' 58'; Rick Ketting 39'; Paul Pöpperl 90+6'	Stadium: Kras Stadion; Attendance: 5,629; Referee: Joey Kooij

4 October 2024 9th week	VVV-Venlo	0–1	SC Cambuur	Venlo
20:00		Report	Thomas Poll 44'	Stadium: De Koel; Attendance: 4,526; Referee: Luuk Timmer

13 October 2024 10th week	MVV Maastricht	2–0	VVV-Venlo	Maastricht
14:30	Ilano Silva Timas 2'; Sven Braken 88'	Report		Stadium: De Geusselt; Attendance: 5,466; Referee: Kevin Puts

18 October 2024 11th week	VVV-Venlo	2–3	FC Dordrecht	Venlo
20:00	Thijme Verheijen 7' 39'	Report	Emmanuel Gyamfi 13' (o.g.); Jaden Slory 56' 86'	Stadium: De Koel; Attendance: 4,130; Referee: Martin Fernando Perezlindo

25 October 2024 12th week	VVV-Venlo	1–2	FC Den Bosch	Venlo
20:00	Gabin Blancquart 83'	Report	Mikuláš Bakaľa 41'; Rik Mulders 63'	Stadium: De Koel; Attendance: 5,191; Referee: Robin Hensgens

1 November 2024 13th week	Jong Ajax	0–1	VVV-Venlo	Duivendrecht, Amsterdam
20:00		Report	Konstantinos Doumtsios 40'	Stadium: Sportpark De Toekomst; Attendance: 932; Referee: Shona Shukrula

8 November 2024 14th week	VVV-Venlo	0–1	Jong AZ	Venlo
20:00		Report	Rio Robbemond 85'	Stadium: De Koel; Attendance: 5,067; Referee: Laurens Gerrets

15 November 2024 15th week	SC Telstar	4–0	VVV-Venlo	Velsen-Zuid
20:00	Youssef El Kachati 2' 72'; Zakaria Eddahchouri 25' (pen.); Danny Bakker 84'	Report		Stadium: BUKO Stadion; Attendance: 2,626; Referee: Rick Sturm

22 November 2024 16th week	VVV-Venlo	0–2	FC Emmen	Venlo
20:00		Report	Jalen Hawkins 20'; Franck Evina 64'	Stadium: De Koel; Attendance: 5,286; Referee: Erwin Blank

1 December 2024 17th week	De Graafschap	3–1	VVV-Venlo	Doetinchem
12:15	Donny Warmerdam 2'; Mimoun Mahi 25'; Ibrahim El Kadiri 90+1'	Report	Sylian Mokono 55'	Stadium: De Vijverberg; Attendance: 11,137; Referee: Sander van der Eijk

6 December 2024 18th week	VVV-Venlo	0–0	TOP Oss	Venlo
20:00		Report		Stadium: De Koel; Attendance: 4,112; Referee: Wouter Wiersma

13 December 2024 19th week	FC Eindhoven	1–3	VVV-Venlo	Eindhoven
20:00	Evan Rottier 31'	Report	Lasse Wehmeyer 13'; Simon Janssen 88'; Thijme Verheijen 90+3'	Stadium: Jan Louwers Stadion; Attendance: 2,314; Referee: Kevin Puts

21 December 2024 20th week	VVV-Venlo	1–1	Excelsior Rotterdam	Venlo
16:30	Lasse Wehmeyer 90'	Report	Lennard Hartjes 53'	Stadium: De Koel; Attendance: 5,591; Referee: Marc Nagtegaal

==== 2nd half ====
12 January 2025 21st week	SBV Vitesse	1–4	VVV-Venlo	Arnhem
16:45	Alexander Büttner 87' (pen.)	Report	Max de Waal 10' (pen.); Naïm Matoug 13'; Sylian Mokono 57'; Gabin Blancquart 75'	Stadium: GelreDome; Attendance: 15,480; Referee: Laurens Gerrets

17 January 2025 22nd week	VVV-Venlo	1–0	SC Telstar	Venlo
20:00	Elias Sierra 78'	Report		Stadium: De Koel; Attendance: 4,077; Referee: Robin Vereijken

27 January 2025 23rd week	Jong PSV	1–2	VVV-Venlo	Eindhoven
20:00	Ayodele Thomas 79'	Report	Max de Waal 12'; Tim Braem 63'	Stadium: De Herdgang; Attendance: 600; Referee: Luuk Timmer

3 February 2025 24th week	Jong AZ	3–0	VVV-Venlo	The Hague
20:15	Job Kalisvaart 15'; Anthony Smits 74'; Lewis Schouten 77'	Report		Stadium: AFAS Trainingscomplex; Attendance: 411; Referee: Rick Sturm

9 February 2025 25th week	VVV-Venlo	0–0	MVV Maastricht	Venlo
12:15		Report		Stadium: De Koel; Attendance: 5,278; Referee: Edwin van de Graaf

22 February 2025 26th week	VVV-Venlo	1–3	FC Volendam	Venlo
16:30	Bjorn van Zijl 77'	Report	Xavier Mbuyamba 80'; Milan de Haan 85'; Robert Mühren 90+5'	Stadium: De Koel; Attendance: 5,312; Referee: Erwin Blank

28 February 2025 27th week	SC Cambuur	5–0	VVV-Venlo	Leeuwarden
20:00	Mark Diemers 19'; Remco Balk 39' 87'; Bryant Nieling 67'; Jonathan Afolabi 81'	Report		Stadium: Kooi Stadion; Attendance: 11,733; Referee: Klass Clerkx

7 March 2025 28th week	VVV-Venlo	1–0	Jong Ajax	Venlo
20:00	Naïm Matoug 70'	Report		Stadium: De Koel; Attendance: 6,107; Referee: Stan Teuben

14 March 2025 29th week	FC Dordrecht	4–0	VVV-Venlo	Dordrecht
20:00	Jari Schuurman 28' (pen.); Jaden Slory 40'; Marouane Afaker 58'; Daniël van Vianen 89'	Report		Stadium: Stadion Krommedijk; Attendance: 3,420; Referee: Laurens Gerrets

22 March 2025 30th week	VVV-Venlo	2–2	FC Eindhoven	Venlo
21:00	Gabin Blancquart 7'; Layee Kromah 44'	Report	Farouq Limouri 21'; Collin Seedorf 84'	Stadium: De Koel; Attendance: 4,914; Referee: Clay Ruperti

29 March 2025 31st week	Roda JC Kerkrade	1–4	VVV-Venlo	Kerkrade
16:30	Saydou Bangura 67'	Report	Simon Janssen 3'; Naïm Matoug 45+1'; Navarone Foor 71'; Gabin Blancquart 90'	Stadium: Parkstad Limburg Stadion; Attendance: 10,345; Referee: Martijn Vos

1 April 2025 32nd week	Jong FC Utrecht	0–0	VVV-Venlo	Utrecht
20:00		Report		Stadium: Sportcomplex Zoudenbalch; Attendance: 334; Referee: Robin Vereijken

4 April 2025 33rd week	TOP Oss	2–1	VVV-Venlo	Oss
20:00	Marcelencio Esajas 26'; Joshua Zimmerman 84'	Report	Xander Lambrix 90+4' (o.g.)	Stadium: Frans Heesen Stadion; Attendance: 2,093; Referee: Stan Teuben

13 April 2025 34th week	VVV-Venlo	4–1	FC Eindhoven	Venlo
16:45	Elias Sierra 41'; Bjorn van Zijl 70'; Navarone Foor 80'; Layee Kromah 89'	Report	Dario Sits 90'	Stadium: De Koel; Attendance: 5,147; Referee: Wouter Wiersma

18 April 2025 35th week	FC Den Bosch	0–0	VVV-Venlo	's-Hertogenbosch
20:00		Report		Stadium: De Vliert; Attendance: 5,550; Referee: Luuk Timmer

28 April 2025 36th week	VVV-Venlo	3–1	De Graafschap	Venlo
20:00	Lasse Wehmeyer 47'; Gabin Blancquart 49'; Dean Zandbergen 59'	Report	Wanya Marçal 58'	Stadium: De Koel; Attendance: 5,045; Referee: Erwin Blank

2 May 2025 37th week	FC Emmen	2–1	VVV-Venlo	Emmen
20:00	Kelian Nsona 34' (pen.); Fridolin Wagner 57'	Report	Layee Kromah 85'	Stadium: De Oude Meerdijk; Attendance: 7,738; Referee: Clay Ruperti

9 May 2025 38th week	VVV-Venlo	2–7	ADO Den Haag	Venlo
20:00	Dean Zandbergen 69'; Joep Kluskens 90'	Report	Jari Vlak 24' 59'; Lee Bonis 33'; Daryl van Mieghem 36'; Evan Rottier 48'; Luka Reischl 63'; Alex Schalk 80'	Stadium: De Koel; Attendance: 6,242; Referee: Robin Hensgens

=== KNVB Cup ===
29 October 2024 1st round	Excelsior Rotterdam	2–1	VVV-Venlo	Rotterdam
21:00	Jerolldino Bergraaf 3'; Noah Naujoks 32'	Report	Martijn Berden 18'	Stadium: Stadion Woudestein; Attendance: 2,951; Referee: Ingmar Oostrom

== Statistics ==
=== Scorers ===
#	Player	Eerste Divisie	KNVB	Total
1	(France) Gabin Blancquart	5	0	5
2	(Greece) Konstantinos Doumtsios	3	0	3
2	(Germany) Lasse Wehmeyer	3	0	3
2	(Netherlands) Layee Kromah	3	0	3
2	(Netherlands) Naïm Matoug	3	0	3
2	(Netherlands) Thijme Verheijen	3	0	3
2	(Netherlands) Martijn Berden	2	1	3
8	(Netherlands) Bjorn van Zijl	2	0	2
8	(Netherlands) Dean Zandbergen	2	0	2
8	(Belgium) Elias Sierra	2	0	2
8	(Netherlands) Max de Waal	2	0	2
8	(Netherlands) Navarone Foor	2	0	2
8	(Netherlands) Pepijn Doesburg	2	0	2
8	(Netherlands) Simon Janssen	2	0	2
8	(Netherlands) Sylian Mokono	2	0	2
8	(Netherlands) Tim Braem	2	0	2
17	(Netherlands) Joep Kluskens	1	0	1
17	(Germany) Paul Pöpperl	1	0	1
17	(Netherlands) Rick Ketting	1	0	1

=== Appearances ===
#	Player	Eerste Divisie	KNVB	Total
1	(Belgium) Elias Sierra	34	1	35
2	(Germany) Lasse Wehmeyer	34	0	34
3	(Netherlands) Naïm Matoug	32	1	33
3	(Netherlands) Simon Janssen	32	1	33
5	(Netherlands) Tim Braem	31	0	31
5	(Ghana) Emmanuel Gyamfi	30	1	31
7	(France) Gabin Blancquart	28	1	29
8	(Netherlands) Rick Ketting	28	0	28
9	(Netherlands) Martijn Berden	25	1	26
9	(Netherlands) Thijme Verheijen	25	1	26
11	(Netherlands) Sylian Mokono	24	0	24
11	(Greece) Konstantinos Doumtsios	23	1	24
13	(Netherlands) Diego van Zutphen	18	1	19
13	(Netherlands) Max de Waal	18	1	19
13	(Netherlands) Pepijn Doesburg	18	1	19
16	(Germany) Paul Pöpperl	17	1	18
17	(Netherlands) Delano van Crooij	15	1	16
18	(Netherlands) Layee Kromah	14	0	14
18	(Netherlands) Navarone Foor	14	0	14
18	(Netherlands) Roel Janssen	14	0	14
18	(Netherlands) Serano Seymor	14	0	14
22	(Netherlands) Bjorn van Zijl	13	0	13
23	(Curaçao) Trevor Doornbusch	12	0	12
23	(Netherlands) Yousri El Anbri	11	1	12
25	(Netherlands) Jan de Boer	11	0	11
26	(Netherlands) Brahim Darri	10	0	10
27	(Netherlands) Dean Zandbergen	9	0	9
27	(Netherlands) Driess Saddiki	9	0	9
29	(Netherlands) Yahcuroo Roemer	8	0	8
29	(Netherlands) Tijn Joosten	7	1	8
31	(Netherlands) Robin Lathouwers	4	0	4
31	(Netherlands) Mohammed Odriss	3	1	4
33	(Netherlands) Resley Kessels	3	0	3
34	(Netherlands) Joep Kluskens	2	0	2
34	(Netherlands) Sam Sow	2	0	2
34	(Netherlands) Youssef Mephtah	2	0	2
37	(Netherlands) Jens Jenniskens	1	0	1
37	(Netherlands) Sven Janssen	1	0	1

=== Clean sheets ===
#	Player	Eerste Divisie
1	(Netherlands) Delano van Crooij	2
1	(Netherlands) Trevor Doornbusch	2
Total		4

=== Disciplinary record ===
#	Player	Eerste Divisie		KNVB		Total	
#	Player	Yellow card	Red card	Yellow card	Red card	Yellow card	Red card
1	(Ghana) Emmanuel Gyamfi	6	2	0	0	6	2
2	(Netherlands) Roel Janssen	4	1	0	0	4	1
3	(Netherlands) Tim Braem	8	0	0	0	8	0
4	(France) Gabin Blancquart	7	0	0	0	7	0
4	(Netherlands) Simon Janssen	7	0	0	0	7	0
6	(Germany) Lasse Wehmeyer	6	0	0	0	6	0
7	(Germany) Paul Pöpperl	3	0	0	0	3	0
7	(Netherlands) Rick Ketting	3	0	0	0	3	0
7	(Netherlands) Sylian Mokono	3	0	0	0	3	0
10	(Netherlands) Max de Waal	2	0	0	0	2	0
10	(Netherlands) Naïm Matoug	2	0	0	0	2	0
10	(Netherlands) Navarone Foor	2	0	0	0	2	0
13	(Netherlands) Brahim Darri	1	0	0	0	1	0
13	(Netherlands) Diego van Zutphen	1	0	0	0	1	0
13	(Netherlands) Jan de Boer	1	0	0	0	1	0
13	(Greece) Konstantinos Doumtsios	1	0	0	0	1	0
13	(Netherlands) Martijn Berden	1	0	0	0	1	0
13	(Netherlands) Serano Seymor	1	0	0	0	1	0
13	(Curaçao) Trevor Doornbusch	1	0	0	0	1	0
13	(Netherlands) Yousri El Anbri	1	0	0	0	1	0
