= 2023–24 VVV-Venlo season =

VVV-Venlo
2023–24 season
- Manager: Rick Kruys
- Stadium: Seacon Stadion – De Koel –
- Eerste Divisie: 12th
- KNVB Cup: 1st round
- Top goalscorer: League: Levi Smans & Michalis Kosidis (9 goals); All: Levi Smans & Michalis Kosidis (9 goals)
- Highest home attendance: 6,961 (10th week)
- Lowest home attendance: 4,068 (22nd week)
- Average home league attendance: 5,468
- Biggest win: 4-1 Jong FC Utrecht (h) 3rd week
- Biggest defeat: 4-0 Helmond Sport (h) 8th week 5-1 SC Heerenveen (a) KNVB Cup 1st round
- All statistics correct as of 10 May 2024.

The 2023–24 season was the 121st season in the history of VVV-Venlo. It was the club's 40th season competing in the Eerste Divisie and their third successive season in the second tier of Dutch football.

Alongside their league campaign, VVV-Venlo also competed in the KNVB Cup. The club reached the second round, where they were eliminated by SC Heerenveen following a 5–1 defeat.

VVV-Venlo concluded the Eerste Divisie season in 12th place.

Levi Smans and Michalis Kosidis finished as the club's joint top goalscorers, with both players scoring nine goals in all competitions.

Elias Sierra recorded the most appearances for VVV-Venlo during the campaign, playing 39 matches across all competitions. He featured 38 times in the Eerste Divisie and made one appearance in the KNVB Cup.

== Players ==
=== First-team squad ===
As of 30 January 2024

Note: Flags indicate national team as defined under FIFA eligibility rules; some limited exceptions apply. Players may hold more than one non-FIFA nationality.

No.	Pos.	Nation	Player
1	GK	NED	Jan de Boer
2	DF	NED	Robin Lathouwers
3	DF	NED	Roel Janssen
4	DF	NED	Rick Ketting
5	DF	NED	Simon Janssen
7	FW	BEL	Milan Robberechts
7	FW	NED	Soulyman Allouch
8	MF	BEL	Elias Sierra
9	FW	GRE	Michalis Kosidis
12	MF	NED	Joep Kluskens
13	MF	CZE	Richard Sedláček
14	MF	NED	Levi Smans

No.	Pos.	Nation	Player
15	DF	NED	Stan Henderikx
16	MF	NED	Robert Klaasen
17	FW	NED	Martijn Berden
18	FW	NED	Pepijn Doesburg
20	DF	CUW	Dylan Timber
21	DF	NED	Moreno Rutten
23	GK	NED	Delano van Crooij
24	MF	NED	Mohammed Odriss
29	DF	NED	Diego van Zutphen
30	GK	NED	Jens Craenmehr
32	FW	SYR	Mohamed Hegi
44	FW	DEN	Magnus Kaastrup

== Transfers ==
=== In ===
Pos.	Player	Transferred from	Fee	Date
DF	(Curaçao) Dylan Timber	(Netherlands) Jong FC Utrecht	Free	1 July 2023
GK	(Netherlands) Jan de Boer	(Netherlands) FC Groningen	Free	13 July 2023
MF	(Belgium) Elias Sierra	(Netherlands) Heracles Almelo		25 July 2023
FW	(Greece) Michalis Kosidis	(Greece) AEK Athens B	On loan	3 August 2023
DF	(Netherlands) Moreno Rutten	(Netherlands) NAC Breda	Free	10 August 2023
DF	(Netherlands) Roel Janssen	(Netherlands) Fortuna Sittard	Free	10 August 2023
FW	(Denmark) Magnus Kaastrup	(Denmark) Lyngby Boldklub	On loan	30 August 2023
FW	(Netherlands) Pepijn Doesburg	(Netherlands) FC Dordrecht	On loan	30 August 2023
GK	(Netherlands) Delano van Crooij	(Netherlands) Sparta Rotterdam	On loan	30 January 2024
FW	(Belgium) Milan Robberechts	(Netherlands) Fortuna Sittard	On loan	30 January 2024

=== Out ===
Pos.	Player	Transferred to	Fee	Date
MF	(Netherlands) Daan Huisman	(Netherlands) SBV Vitesse	End of loan	30 June 2023
MF	(Netherlands) Kees de Boer	No club		1 July 2023
MF	(Czech Republic) Lukáš Zima	(Romania) FC Petrolul Ploiești	Free	1 July 2023
FW	(Netherlands) Sven Braken	(Belgium) KMSK Deinze	Free	1 July 2023
FW	(Netherlands) Thijme Verheijen	(Netherlands) MVV Maastricht		1 July 2023
FW	(Netherlands) Tristan Dekker	No club		1 July 2023
FW	(Suriname) Yahcuroo Roemer	(Luxembourg) F91 Dudelange	Free	4 July 2023
DF	(Germany) Brian Koglin	(Netherlands) Roda JC Kerkrade	Free	12 July 2023
GK	(Netherlands) Ennio van der Gouw	(Belgium) SV Zulte Waregem		12 July 2023
GK	(Turkey) Özcan Yaşar	(Turkey) Fethiyespor	Free	15 July 2023
FW	(Iceland) Kristófer Kristinsson	(Iceland) Breiðablik	Free	7 August 2023
FW	(Sweden) Carl Johansson	(Sweden) IFK Värnamo	Free	11 August 2023
FW	(Netherlands) Nick Venema	(France) Valenciennes FC		15 August 2023
MF	(Netherlands) Mitchell van Rooijen	(Spain) CD Manchego Ciudad Real	Free	25 August 2023
FW	(Netherlands) Soulyman Allouch	(Azerbaijan) Sabail FK		2 February 2024

== Pre-season and friendlies ==
Win Draw Loss Fixtures

5 August 2023 Friendly	VVV-Venlo (Netherlands)	2–3	(Netherlands) Fortuna Sittard

== Competitions ==
=== Overall record ===
Competition	First match	Last match	Starting round	Final position	Record							
Competition	First match	Last match	Starting round	Final position	Pld	W	D	L	GF	GA	GD	Win %
Eerste Divisie	13 August 2023	10 May 2024	Week 1	12th	38	13	9	16	53	58	−5	34.21
KNVB Cup	31 October 2023	31 October 2023	1st round	1st round	1	0	0	1	1	5	−4	0.00
Total					39	13	9	17	54	63	−9	33.33

Last updated: 22 September 2023
Source: ESPN

=== Eerste Divisie ===
==== League table ====
Pos	Team	Pld	W	D	L	GF	GA	GD	Pts	Promotion or qualification
10	Jong AZ	38	16	8	14	62	61	+1	56	Reserve teams are not eligible to be promoted to the Eredivisie
11	Helmond Sport	38	14	9	15	52	55	−3	51	
12	VVV-Venlo	38	13	9	16	53	58	−5	48	
13	Cambuur	38	13	8	17	71	74	−3	47	
14	Eindhoven	38	9	16	13	45	57	−12	43	

Source: Flashscore, Keuken Kampioen Divisie (in Dutch)
Rules for classification: Season in progress: 1) Most points won; 2) Less points lost; 3) Goal difference; 4) Goals scored; 5) Alphabetical order; End of season: 1) Points; 2) Goal difference; 3) Goals scored; 4) Head-to-head points; 5) Head-to-head goal difference; 6) Head-to-head away goals scored; 7) Play-off if relevant for deciding champion, relegation or participating in a European league, otherwise by draw. 8) Penalty shoot-out (only after a play-off)

==== Results summary ====
Overall								Home						Away					
Pld	W	D	L	GF	GA	GD	Pts	W	D	L	GF	GA	GD	W	D	L	GF	GA	GD
38	13	9	16	53	58	−5	48	10	3	6	35	30	+5	3	6	10	18	28	−10

Last updated: 13 September 2026.
Source: https://www.espn.nl/voetbal/team/scorebord/_/id/3731/season/2023

==== Results by round ====
Round	1	2	3	4	5	6	7	8	9	10	11	12	13	14	15	16	17	18	19	20	21	22	23	24	25	26	27	28	29	30	31	32	33	34	35	36	37	38
Ground	H	A	H	H	A	H	A	H	A	H	A	A	H	A	H	H	A	H	A	H	A	H	A	H	A	A	H	A	H	A	A	H	A	H	A	H	H	A
Result	L	D	W	W	W	W	D	L	L	D	W	D	D	W	L	L	L	W	L	W	D	W	L	W	D	L	D	D	W	L	L	W	L	L	L	L	W	L
Position	18	16	10	4	4	2																																

Updated to match(es) played on 10 May 2024. Source:
A = Away; H = Home; W = Win; D = Draw; L = Loss

=== Matches ===
The league fixtures were unveiled on 30 June 2023.

==== 1st half ====
13 August 2023 1st week	VVV-Venlo	1–3	MVV Maastricht	Venlo
16:45	Simon Janssen 76'	Report	Ferre Slegers 47'; Marko Kleinen 49'; Koen Kostons 87' (pen.)	Stadium: Covebo Stadion; Attendance: 5,510; Referee: Bas Nijhuis

18 August 2023 2nd week	FC Emmen	2–2	VVV-Venlo	Emmen
20:00	Patrick Brouwer 13'; Piotr Parzyszek 71'	Report	Soulyman Allouch 19' 33'	Stadium: De Oude Meerdijk; Attendance: 7,200; Referee: Jochem Kamphuis

25 August 2023 3rd week	VVV-Venlo	4–1	Jong FC Utrecht	Venlo
20:00	Rick Ketting 7'; Levi Smans 25'; Soulyman Allouch 56'; Michalis Kosidis 70'	Report	Nazjir Held 45+1'	Stadium: Covebo Stadion; Attendance: 5,451; Referee: Michael Eijgelsheim

1 September 2023 4th week	VVV-Venlo	2–0	De Graafschap	Venlo
20:00	Michalis Kosidis 33' 81' (pen.)	Report		Stadium: Covebo Stadion; Attendance: 4,953; Referee: Alex Bos

9 September 2023 5th week	SC Telstar	1–2	VVV-Venlo	Velsen-Zuid
16:30	Jayden Turfkruier 14'	Report	Pepijn Doesburg 73'; Martijn Berden 90+5'	Stadium: Sportpark Schoonenberg; Attendance: 1,369; Referee: Jesse Rozendal

15 September 2023 6th week	VVV-Venlo	3–1	NAC Breda	Venlo
20:00	Levi Smans 4' 8'; Magnus Kaastrup 36'	Report	Dominik Janošek 47'	Stadium: Covebo Stadion; Attendance: 5,650; Referee: Richard Martens

22 September 2023 7th week	Jong PSV	0–0	VVV-Venlo	Eindhoven
20:00		Report		Stadium: De Herdgang; Attendance: 684; Referee: Robin Vereijken

1 October 2023 8th week	VVV-Venlo	0–4	Helmond Sport	Venlo
12:15		Report	Giannis-Fivos Botos 8'; Hakon Lorentzen 48'; Joeri Schroyen 63'; Martijn Kaars 64'	Stadium: Covebo Stadion; Attendance: 5,171; Referee: Erwin Blank

6 October 2023 9th week	Jong Ajax	3–0	VVV-Venlo	Duivendrecht
20:00	Kristian Hlynsson 20'; Anass Salah-Eddine 32'; Mika Godts 56'	Report		Stadium: De Toekomst; Attendance: 814; Referee: Wouter Wiersma

14 October 2023 10th week	VVV-Venlo	1–1	Roda JC Kerkrade	Venlo
16:30	Pepijn Doesburg 66'	Report	Brian Koglin 73'	Stadium: Covebo Stadion; Attendance: 6,961; Referee: Jochem Kamphuis

20 October 2023 11th week	FC Den Bosch	1–2	VVV-Venlo	Den Bosch
20:00	Ilias Boumassaoudi 14'	Report	Dylan Timber 47'; Martijn Berden 48'	Stadium: De Vliert; Attendance: 4,337; Referee: Laurens Gerrets

27 October 2023 12th week	ADO Den Haag	2–2	VVV-Venlo	The Hague
20:00	Henk Veerman 62'; Joel Ideho 73'	Report	Martijn Berden 47'; Levi Smans 88'	Stadium: Bingoal Stadion; Attendance: 7,409; Referee: Martin Fernando Perezlindo

3 November 2023 13th week	VVV-Venlo	2–2	Jong AZ	Venlo
20:00	Robin Lathouwers 57'; Rick Ketting 87'	Report	Ricuenio Kewal 45+2'; Loek Postma 90+5'	Stadium: Covebo Stadion; Attendance: 5,209; Referee: Michael Eijgelsheim

10 November 2023 14th week	FC Eindhoven	0–2	VVV-Venlo	Eindhoven
20:00		Report	Magnus Kaastrup 7' 76'	Stadium: Jan Louwers Stadion; Attendance: 3,675; Referee: Dunken van de Velde

17 November 2023 15th week	VVV-Venlo	1–3	Willem II Tilburg	Venlo
21:00	Rick Ketting 89'	Report	Thijs Oosting 57'; Raffael Behounek 63'; Freek Heerkens 80'	Stadium: Covebo Stadion; Attendance: 5,715; Referee: Clay Ruperti

24 November 2023 16th week	VVV-Venlo	1–2	SC Cambuur	Venlo
20:00	Richard Sedláček 78'	Report	Fedde de Jong 5'; Milan Smit 18'	Stadium: Covebo Stadion; Attendance: 5,551; Referee: Alex Bos

1 December 2023 17th week	FC Groningen	2–1	VVV-Venlo	Groningen
20:00	Laros Duarte 70'; Jorg Schreuders 73'	Report	Michalis Kosidis 8'	Stadium: Euroborg; Attendance: 18,504; Referee: Laurens Gerrets

8 December 2023 18th week	VVV-Venlo	3–1	FC Dordrecht	Venlo
20:00	Michalis Kosidis 39'; Rick Ketting 53'; Levi Smans 90+4'	Report	Shiloh 't Zand 32'	Stadium: Covebo Stadion; Attendance: 4,485; Referee: Richard Martens

15 December 2023 19th week	TOP Oss	2–1	VVV-Venlo	Oss
20:00	Arthur Allemeersch 11'; Enrico Dueñas 36'	Report	Elias Sierra 39'	Stadium: Frans Heesen Stadion; Attendance: 1,833; Referee: Luuk Timmer

22 December 2023 20th week	VVV-Venlo	2–1	SC Telstar	Venlo
20:00	Levi Smans 14'; Magnus Kaastrup 61'	Report	Zakaria Eddahchouri 34'	Stadium: Covebo Stadion; Attendance: 5,091; Referee: Edwin van de Graaf

==== 2nd half ====
15 January 2024 21st week	Jong FC Utrecht	0–0	VVV-Venlo	Utrecht
20:00		Report		Stadium: Sportcomplex Zoudenbalch; Attendance: 302; Referee: Kevin Puts

22 January 2024 22nd week	VVV-Venlo	2–1	ADO Den Haag	Venlo
20:00	Elias Sierra 17'; Rick Ketting 39'	Report	Jort van der Sande 20'	Stadium: Covebo Stadion; Attendance: 4,068; Referee: Stan Teuben

26 January 2024 23rd week	De Graafschap	3–0	VVV-Venlo	Doetinchem
20:00	Devin Haen 32'; Jeffry Fortes 55'; Ralf Seuntjens 84'	Report		Stadium: De Vijverberg; Attendance: 10,498; Referee: Bas Nijhuis

2 February 2024 24th week	VVV-Venlo	3–2	Jong PSV	Venlo
20:00	Thijme Verheijen 7' 47'; Pepijn Doesburg 90+2'	Report	Jevon Simons 31'; Mylian Jimenez 65'	Stadium: Covebo Stadion; Attendance: 4,952; Referee: Thomas Hardeman

10 February 2024 25th week	SC Cambuur	3–3	VVV-Venlo	Leeuwarden
16:30	Roberts Uldrikis 7' 88'; Rick Ketting 10' (o.g.)	Report	Martijn Berden 17'; Michalis Kosidis 29'; Milan Robberechts 90+1'	Stadium: Cambuur Stadion; Attendance: 9,607; Referee: Marc Nagtegaal

16 February 2024 26th week	FC Dordrecht	1–0	VVV-Venlo	Dordrecht
20:00	Mathis Suray 63'	Report		Stadium: Stadion Krommedijk; Attendance: 2,785; Referee: Jochem Kamphuis

23 February 2024 27th week	VVV-Venlo	2–2	FC Eindhoven	Venlo
20:00	Levi Smans 17'; Michalis Kosidis 89'	Report	Jasper Dahlhaus 50'; Ozan Kökçü 55'	Stadium: Covebo Stadion; Attendance: 5,171; Referee: Erwin Blank

1 March 2024 28th week	Helmond Sport	1–1	VVV-Venlo	Helmond
20:00	Joeri Schroyen 63'	Report	Thijme Verheijen 32'	Stadium: Stadion De Braak; Attendance: 2,722; Referee: Richard Martens

8 March 2024 29th week	VVV-Venlo	2–0	FC Emmen	Venlo
20:00	Michalis Kosidis 50'; Pepijn Doesburg 90+4'	Report		Stadium: Covebo Stadion; Attendance: 5,019; Referee: Laurens Gerrets

15 March 2024 30th week	NAC Breda	1–0	VVV-Venlo	Breda
20:00	Cuco Martina 90+5'	Report		Stadium: Rat Verlegh Stadion; Attendance: 18,126; Referee: Bas Nijhuis

23 March 2024 31st week	Willem II Tilburg	2–0	VVV-Venlo	Tilburg
20:00	Jeredy Hilterman 19'; Rick Ketting 47' (o.g.)	Report		Stadium: Koning Willem II Stadion; Attendance: 13,557; Referee: Dennis Higler

29 March 2024 32nd week	VVV-Venlo	2–0	TOP Oss	Venlo
20:00	Elias Sierra 66'; Pepijn Doesburg 89'	Report		Stadium: Covebo Stadion; Attendance: 5,988; Referee: Edwin van de Graaf

7 April 2024 33rd week	Roda JC Kerkrade	2–1	VVV-Venlo	Kerkrade
16:45	Joey Müller 27'; Boyd Reith 72'	Report	Martijn Berden 90+1'	Stadium: Parkstad Limburg Stadion; Attendance: 12,204; Referee: Richard Martens

14 April 2024 34th week	VVV-Venlo	0–1	FC Groningen	Venlo
16:45		Report	Jorg Schreuders 78'	Stadium: Covebo Stadion; Attendance: 6,612; Referee: Martin van den Kerkhof

22 April 2024 35th week	Jong AZ	2–1	VVV-Venlo	The Hague
20:00	Denso Kasius 65'; Jayden Addai 76' (pen.)	Report	Levi Smans 19'	Stadium: AFAS Trainingscomplex; Attendance: 550; Referee: Nick Smit

26 April 2024 36th week	VVV-Venlo	2–3	FC Den Bosch	Venlo
20:00	Levi Smans 52'; Michalis Kosidis 76'	Report	Jaron Vicario 45+2'; Salah-Eddine Oulad M'Hand 54'; Kacper Kostorz 87'	Stadium: Covebo Stadion; Attendance: 6,008; Referee: Martijn Vos, Alex Bos

3 May 2024 37th week	VVV-Venlo	2–0	Jong Ajax	Venlo
20:00	Nick Verschuren 73' (o.g.); Pepijn Doesburg 81'	Report		Stadium: Covebo Stadion; Attendance: 6,675; Referee: Kevin Puts

10 May 2024 38th week	MVV Maastricht	2–0	VVV-Venlo	Maastricht
20:00	Dailon Livramento 17'; Bryan Smeets 29'	Report		Stadium: De Geusselt; Attendance: 8,500; Referee: Martijn Vos

=== KNVB Cup ===
31 October 2023 1st round	SC Heerenveen	5–1	VVV-Venlo	Heerenveen
20:00	Pelle van Amersfoort 21' 40' 44'; Espen van Ee 68'; Daniel Karlsbakk 90'	Report	Soulyman Allouch 76'	Stadium: Abe Lenstra Stadion; Attendance: 12,000; Referee: Ingmar Oostrom

== Statistics ==
=== Scorers ===
#	Player	Eerste Divisie	KNVB	Total
1	(Netherlands) Levi Smans	9	0	9
1	(Greece) Michalis Kosidis	9	0	9
3	(Netherlands) Martijn Berden	5	0	5
3	(Netherlands) Pepijn Doesburg	5	0	5
3	(Netherlands) Rick Ketting	5	0	5
6	(Netherlands) Soulyman Allouch	3	1	4
7	(Belgium) Elias Sierra	3	0	3
7	(Denmark) Magnus Kaastrup	3	0	3
9	(Czech Republic) Richard Sedláček	2	0	2
10	(Curaçao) Dylan Timber	1	0	1
10	(Belgium) Milan Robberechts	1	0	1
10	(Netherlands) Robin Lathouwers	1	0	1
10	(Netherlands) Simon Janssen	1	0	1

=== Appearances ===
#	Player	Eerste Divisie	KNVB	Total
1	(Belgium) Elias Sierra	38	1	39
2	(Netherlands) Rick Ketting	37	1	38
2	(Netherlands) Simon Janssen	37	1	38
4	(Netherlands) Levi Smans	35	1	36
5	(Netherlands) Martijn Berden	35	0	35
5	(Greece) Michalis Kosidis	34	1	35
7	(Netherlands) Pepijn Doesburg	33	1	34
8	(Denmark) Magnus Kaastrup	32	1	33
9	(Netherlands) Joep Kluskens	29	1	30
9	(Czech Republic) Richard Sedláček	29	1	30
9	(Netherlands) Roel Janssen	29	1	30
12	(Netherlands) Moreno Rutten	26	1	27
13	(Netherlands) Jan de Boer	23	1	24
14	(Netherlands) Robin Lathouwers	20	1	21
15	(Netherlands) Mohammed Odriss	18	0	18
15	(Netherlands) Soulyman Allouch	17	1	18
17	(Netherlands) Robert Klaasen	15	1	16
18	(Netherlands) Delano van Crooij	15	0	15
18	(Curaçao) Dylan Timber	14	1	15
20	(Netherlands) Stan Henderikx	13	0	13
21	(Netherlands) Diego van Zutphen	12	0	12
22	(Belgium) Milan Robberechts	10	0	10
23	(Syria) Mohamed Hegi	4	0	4
24	(Netherlands) Jens Craenmehr	1	0	1

=== Clean sheets ===
#	Player	Eerste Divisie
1	(Netherlands) Jan de Boer	4
2	(Netherlands) Delano van Crooij	3
Total		7

=== Disciplinary record ===
#	Player	Eerste Divisie		KNVB		Total	
#	Player	Yellow card	Red card	Yellow card	Red card	Yellow card	Red card
1	(Netherlands) Roel Janssen	7	1	0	0	7	1
2	(Czech Republic) Richard Sedláček	2	1	0	0	2	1
3	(Netherlands) Jan de Boer	0	1	0	0	0	1
4	(Netherlands) Rick Ketting	6	0	0	0	6	0
5	(Netherlands) Levi Smans	5	0	0	0	5	0
5	(Netherlands) Simon Janssen	4	0	1	0	5	0
7	(Netherlands) Joep Kluskens	3	0	0	0	3	0
7	(Netherlands) Martijn Berden	3	0	0	0	3	0
7	(Greece) Michalis Kosidis	3	0	0	0	3	0
7	(Netherlands) Moreno Rutten	3	0	0	0	3	0
7	(Netherlands) Robert Klaasen	3	0	0	0	3	0
7	(Denmark) Magnus Kaastrup	2	0	1	0	3	0
13	(Curaçao) Dylan Timber	2	0	0	0	2	0
13	(Belgium) Elias Sierra	2	0	0	0	2	0
13	(Netherlands) Pepijn Doesburg	2	0	0	0	2	0
16	(Netherlands) Diego van Zutphen	1	0	0	0	1	0
16	(Netherlands) Mohammed Odriss	1	0	0	0	1	0
16	(Netherlands) Robin Lathouwers	1	0	0	0	1	0
16	(Netherlands) Soulyman Allouch	1	0	0	0	1	0
