= Naïm Matoug =

Dutch footballer (born 2003)

Personal information
- Date of birth: 12 April 2003 (age 23)
- Place of birth: Grubbenvorst, Netherlands
- Position: Winger

Team information
- Current team: MVV
- Number: 27

Youth career
- –2016: Sparta '18
- 2016–2018: VVV-Venlo
- 2018–2021: PSV
- 2021–2024: Willem II

Senior career*
Years	Team	Apps	(Gls)
2020–2021	Jong PSV	1	(0)
2023–2024	Willem II	0	(0)
2024–2026	VVV-Venlo	57	(5)
2026–	MVV	1	(0)

International career^{‡}
2018	Netherlands U15	4	(0)
2019	Netherlands U16	2	(0)
- * Club domestic league appearances and goals as of 22:39, 5 September 2026 (UTC) ‡ National team caps and goals as of 13:17, 8 January 2021 (UTC)

Naïm Matoug (born 12 April 2003) is a Dutch professional footballer who plays as a winger for club MVV.

== Club career ==
=== Early years ===
Naïm Matoug was born on 12 April 2003 in Grubbenvorst, Limburg, Netherlands, and began his youth career with Sparta '18 before joining the academy of VVV-Venlo. In 2018, he moved to the youth setup of PSV, where he signed his first professional contract in August 2019, running until mid-2022.

=== Jong PSV ===
Matoug made his professional debut for Jong PSV on 6 November 2020 in a 2–1 away victory over FC Den Bosch in the Eerste Divisie. He was introduced as a substitute in the 81st minute for Koen Oostenbrink. The match was played under exceptional circumstances, with Jong PSV fielding several youth players due to the absence of eighteen squad members, twelve of whom were unavailable after contracting SARS-CoV-2 during the COVID-19 pandemic.

=== Willem II ===
In July 2021, Matoug joined Willem II, initially linking up with the club's under-21 side. He signed a one-year contract, which was extended in both 2022 and 2023 through successive one-year renewals. He left the Tilburg-based club in the summer of 2024.

=== Return to VVV-Venlo ===
In May 2024, Matoug returned to VVV-Venlo, initially joining the club's reserve side. Ahead of the 2024–25 Eerste Divisie season, he was promoted to the first-team squad during pre-season preparations in order to earn a place through friendly matches. At the end of July, head coach John Lammers permanently promoted Matoug to the senior team alongside Tim Braem.

He made his official first-team debut on 10 August 2024 in a 1–1 away draw against ADO Den Haag. Coming on as a substitute for Lasse Wehmeyer in the 61st minute, Matoug provided the assist for VVV-Venlo's equaliser. During the first 17 league matches of the season, Matoug featured in every fixture, starting 11 of them. In December 2024, he was rewarded for his rapid development by signing his first full professional contract with VVV-Venlo, running until 1 July 2026, with an option for an additional season. On 13 January 2025, Matoug scored his first professional goal in a 4–1 away victory over Vitesse, although he was forced off later in the match with a pulled hamstring. Nearly two months later, he returned from injury as a substitute in a home match against Jong Ajax, scoring the winning goal with a free kick in a 1–0 victory.

In the 2025–26 season, Matoug made 25 league appearances for VVV, scoring twice and providing one assist. He left the club at the end of the season as a free agent. He had made 58 appearances for VVV-Venlo over the previous two seasons, with an involvement in nine goals. In June 2026, he joined De Graafschap on trial ahead of the 2026–27 pre-season.

=== MVV ===
On 27 August 2026, Matoug joined Eerste Divisie club MVV as a free agent. He signed a one-year contract with an option for a further year, and took the number 27 shirt.

== International career ==
Born in the Netherlands, Matoug is of Algerian and Dutch descent. He was a youth international for the Netherlands.

== Career statistics ==
As of match played 28 August 2026

Appearances and goals by club, season and competition
Club	Season	League			National cup		Other		Total	
Club	Season	Division	Apps	Goals	Apps	Goals	Apps	Goals	Apps	Goals
Jong PSV	2020–21	Eerste Divisie	1	0	—		—		1	0
Willem II	2023–24	Eerste Divisie	0	0	0	0	—		0	0
VVV-Venlo	2024–25	Eerste Divisie	32	3	1	0	—		33	3
VVV-Venlo	2025–26	Eerste Divisie	25	2	0	0	—		25	2
VVV-Venlo	Total		57	5	1	0	—		58	5
MVV	2026–27	Eerste Divisie	1	0	0	0	—		1	0
Career total			59	5	1	0	0	0	60	5
