= John Lammers =

John Lammers may refer to:

- John Lammers (ice hockey)
- John Lammers (footballer)
