= Tim Braem =

Dutch footballer (born 2006)

Personal information
- Date of birth: 13 February 2006 (age 20)
- Place of birth: Venlo, Netherlands
- Height: 1.83 m (6 ft 0 in)
- Position: Defensive midfielder

Team information
- Current team: De Graafschap
- Number: 20

Youth career
- –2014: Venlosche Boys
- 2014–2024: VVV-Venlo

Senior career*
Years	Team	Apps	(Gls)
2024–2025	VVV-Venlo	32	(2)
2025–	De Graafschap	11	(1)

International career^{‡}
2024–2025	Netherlands U19	4	(0)
- * Club domestic league appearances and goals as of 29 August 2026 ‡ National team caps and goals as of 22 July 2025

Tim Braem (born 13 February 2006) is a Dutch professional footballer who plays as a defensive midfielder for Eerste Divisie club De Graafschap.

== Club career ==
Braem briefly played for local amateur side Venlosche Boys before joining the youth academy of VVV-Venlo in 2014, where he spent ten years developing through the club's youth system.

Ahead of the 2024–25 season, the 18-year-old midfielder was invited to join the first-team squad during pre-season to prove himself in friendly matches. At the end of July 2024, he and Naïm Matoug were permanently promoted to the senior squad by head coach John Lammers.

Braem made his professional debut on 10 August 2024 in the opening league match away against ADO Den Haag, which ended in a 1–1 draw. He scored his first league goal on 25 August 2024 with a shot into the top-right corner during a 1–1 home draw against Roda JC Kerkrade.

Braem quickly established himself as a regular starter and signed his first professional contract on 16 October 2024, keeping him at VVV until 1 July 2027 with an option for an additional season.

During his first professional season, Braem also became a youth international and on 2 August 2025 received the Jan Klaassens Award, the annual prize awarded to the biggest talent from the VVV youth academy.

Despite interest from clubs in Italy and the Eredivisie, Braem joined De Graafschap in September 2025, signing a three-year contract with an option for a fourth season. Reportedly, De Graafschap paid a transfer fee between €150,000 and €200,000 to VVV-Venlo.

== International career ==
=== Netherlands U19 ===
In November 2024, Braem received his first call-up to the Netherlands U19 squad. Together with Jerolldino Bergraaf of Excelsior Rotterdam, he was one of only two players from the Eerste Divisie selected by head coach Peter van der Veen.

He made his international debut on 13 November 2024 as a stoppage-time substitute for Tygo Land during a UEFA European Under-19 Championship qualification match against Slovenia U19, which the Netherlands won 2–0.

Braem was also part of the Netherlands squad that won the 2025 UEFA European Under-19 Championship in Romania.

== Career statistics ==
Appearances and goals by club, season and competition
Club	Season	League			Cup		Play-offs		Total	
Club	Season	Division	Apps	Goals	Apps	Goals	Apps	Goals	Apps	Goals
VVV-Venlo	2024–25	Eerste Divisie	31	2	0	0	—		31	2
VVV-Venlo	2025–26	Eerste Divisie	1	0	0	0	—		1	0
De Graafschap	2025–26	Eerste Divisie	0	0	0	0	—		0	0
Career total			32	2	0	0	0	0	32	2

== Honours ==
Netherlands U19

- UEFA European Under-19 Championship: 2025

== Personal life ==
Braem's father, Geert Braem, was also a professional footballer and played for VVV-Venlo, Helmond Sport, FC Eindhoven and Go Ahead Eagles.
