= Magnus Kaastrup =

Danish footballer (born 2000)

Personal information
- Full name: Magnus Kaastrup Refstrup Lauritsen
- Date of birth: 28 December 2000 (age 25)
- Place of birth: Virring, Denmark
- Height: 1.76 m (5 ft 9 in)
- Positions: Winger; forward

Team information
- Current team: Aarhus Fremad
- Number: 7

Youth career
- Virring SSV
- 2013–2017: AGF

Senior career*
Years	Team	Apps	(Gls)
2017–2021	AGF	17	(1)
2019–2020	→ Borussia Dortmund II (loan)	16	(3)
2020	→ Viborg (loan)	10	(1)
2021–2024	Lyngby	67	(13)
2023	→ IK Sirius (loan)	10	(0)
2023–2024	→ VVV-Venlo (loan)	32	(4)
2024–2025	Vendsyssel	30	(5)
2025–	Aarhus Fremad	32	(7)

International career
2015–2016	Denmark U16	7	(1)
2016–2017	Denmark U17	13	(3)
2017–2018	Denmark U18	6	(0)
2018–2019	Denmark U19	8	(1)
2021	Denmark U20	2	(0)
- * Club domestic league appearances and goals as of 2 June 2026

Magnus Kaastrup Refstrup Lauritsen (born 28 December 2000) is a Danish professional footballer who plays as winger for Danish 1st Division club Aarhus Fremad.

== Career ==
=== AGF ===
Kaastrup joined AGF in the summer 2013 from Virring SSV as an under-14 player. On 1 January 2016, he signed a youth contract with the club.

In January 2017, Kaastrup joined the first team squad on their training camp in Portugal. He made his official first team debut on 14 July 2017, in a game against AC Horsens, replacing Jakob Ankersen with 15 minutes to go. He became the youngest ever debutant for the club at the age of 16 years and 198 days. On 28 March 2018, Kaastrup signed a full-time contract with AGF with expiration at the end of 2020.

On 27 May 2019, AGF announced that they had loaned out Kaastrup to the reserve team of Dortmund, Borussia Dortmund II, from the upcoming 2019–20 season, being reunited with his former manager Mike Tullberg.

On 5 October 2020, Kaastrup was loaned out again, this time to Danish 1st Division club Viborg FF for the rest of 2020. He made his debut on 16 October, coming off the bench as a late substitute in a 3–1 victory against Fremad Amager. He made 10 appearances for the club, in which he scored one goal and provided two assists.

=== Lyngby ===
On transfer deadline day, 1 February 2021, Kaastrup joined Lyngby Boldklub on a deal until June 2023. His debut came on 7 February in a 1–0 away league defeat to his former club AGF, where he came on as a substitute in the 62nd minute for Emil Nielsen. He made his first start in his third game for the club, a 2–2 home draw against Copenhagen. He suffered relegation to the Danish 1st Division with the club on 9 May after a loss to last placed AC Horsens.

He had a strong start to the 2021–22 season, recording three goals and three assists in the first six league games. On 23 October, he scored the winner in a 1–0 victory against AC Horsens, lifting Lyngby to the top of the league table. On 2 April 2022, Kaastrup scored a hat-trick in a 5–0 win against Nykøbing to draw his club closer to promotion, which was achieved on 23 May.

==== IK Sirius (loan) ====
On 28 March 2023, Kaastrup was sent on a one-season loan to Allsvenskan club IK Sirius. He made his debut for the club on matchday one of the 2023 campaign, replacing Tashreeq Matthews in the 62nd minute of a 1–1 away draw against IFK Norrköping, managed by Glen Riddersholm who had given Kaastrup his professional debut for AGF in 2017. The following week he made his first start for Sirius, playing 81 minutes in a 0–0 home draw against Djurgårdens IF. On 30 June 2023 Lyngby confirmed, that Kaastrup had returned to the club, six months early.

==== VVV-Venlo (loan) ====
On 30 August 2023, Kaastrup joined VVV-Venlo in the Netherlands on loan with an option to buy. He debuted for the club on 1 September, starting in a 2–0 victory against De Graafschap. He made an immediate impact, providing his first assist for Michalis Kosidis' opening goal in the 33rd minute. On 15 September, Kaastrup scored his first competitive goal for VVV in a 3–1 league win over NAC Breda.

=== Vendsyssel FF ===
On 18 June 2024 Danish 1st Division club Vendsyssel FF confirmed that Kaastrup joined the club on a contract until June 2027.

=== Aarhus Fremad ===
On 27 June 2025, Danish 1st Division side Aarhus Fremad announced the signing of Kaastrup on a two-year contract.

== Career statistics ==
As of match played 10 May 2024

Appearances and goals by club, season and competition
Club	Season	League			Cup		Other		Total	
Club	Season	Division	Apps	Goals	Apps	Goals	Apps	Goals	Apps	Goals
AGF	2017–18	Superliga	9	0	1	0	1 (Note: One appearance in the 2017–18 Danish Superliga Europa League playoff)	0	11	0
AGF	2018–19	Superliga	4	0	2	1	0	0	6	1
AGF	2019–20	Superliga	0	0	0	0	0	0	0	0
AGF	2020–21	Superliga	0	0	0	0	0	0	0	0
AGF	Total		13	0	3	1	1	0	17	1
Borussia Dortmund II (loan)	2019–20	Regionalliga West	17	3	0	0	—		17	3
Viborg (loan)	2020–21	1st Division	10	1	0	0	—		10	1
Lyngby	2020–21	Superliga	17	2	0	0	—		17	2
Lyngby	2021–22	1st Division	31	11	3	1	—		34	12
Lyngby	2022–23	Superliga	19	0	1	0	—		20	0
Lyngby	Total		67	13	4	1	—		71	14
IK Sirius (loan)	2023	Allsvenskan	10	0	0	0	—		10	0
VVV-Venlo (loan)	2023–24	Eerste Divisie	32	4	1	0	—		33	4
Career total			149	21	8	2	1	0	158	23
