= Jan de Boer (footballer, born 2000) =

Dutch footballer (born 2000)

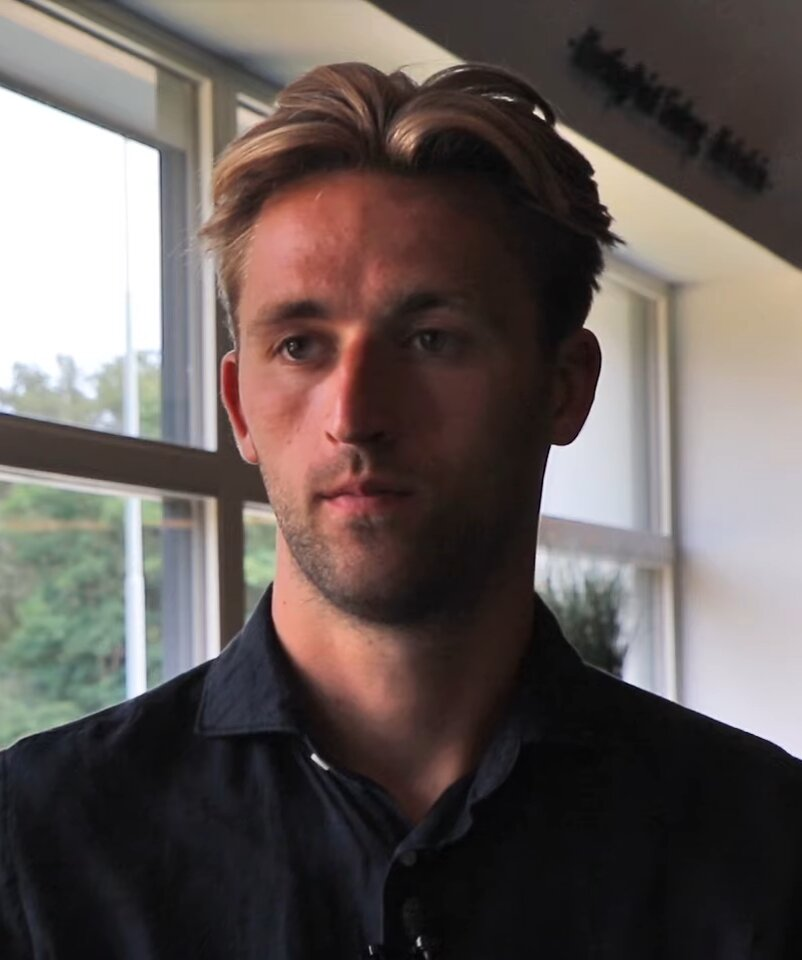
- De Boer in 2023

Personal information
- Full name: Jan Pieter Lambertus Martinus de Boer
- Date of birth: 20 May 2000 (age 26)
- Place of birth: Sneek, Netherlands
- Height: 1.99 m (6 ft 6 in)
- Position: Goalkeeper

Team information
- Current team: Bryne
- Number: 12

Youth career
- VV Slev
- ONS Sneek
- 2011–2019: Heerenveen

Senior career*
Years	Team	Apps	(Gls)
2019–2023	Groningen	3	(0)
2023–2025	VVV-Venlo	34	(0)
2025–	Bryne	33	(0)
- * Club domestic league appearances and goals as of 14 November 2026

Jan de Boer (born 20 May 2000) is a Dutch professional footballer who plays as a goalkeeper for Norwegian First Division club Bryne.

== Career ==
=== Groningen ===
De Boer joined Groningen in August 2019. He remained a backup for his first three seasons with the club.

He made his Eredivisie debut for Groningen on 23 October 2022 in a game against PSV Eindhoven. He was chosen player of the match for his performance in a 4–2 victory.

=== VVV-Venlo ===
On 13 July 2023, De Boer signed a two-year contract with an option for an additional season with Eerste Divisie club VVV-Venlo.

=== Bryne ===
On 5 February 2025, de Boer signed a two-year contract with Bryne, freshly promoted to the Norwegian top-tier Eliteserien. After a man of the match award in March 2025, he received four trays of eggs as a reward.

== Career statistics ==
As of match played 14 November 2026

Appearances and goals by club, season and competition
Club	Season	League			National cup		Total	
Club	Season	Division	Apps	Goals	Apps	Goals	Apps	Goals
Groningen	2022–23	Eredivisie	3	0	1	0	4	0
VVV-Venlo	2023–24	Eerste Divisie	23	0	1	0	24	0
VVV-Venlo	2024–25	Eerste Divisie	11	0	0	0	11	0
VVV-Venlo	Total		34	0	1	0	35	0
Bryne	2025	Eliteserien	29	0	0	0	29	0
Bryne	2026	Norwegian First Division	4	0	5	0	9	0
Bryne	Total		33	0	5	0	38	0
Career total			70	0	7	0	77	0
