= Pim Doesburg =

Dutch footballer (1943–2020)

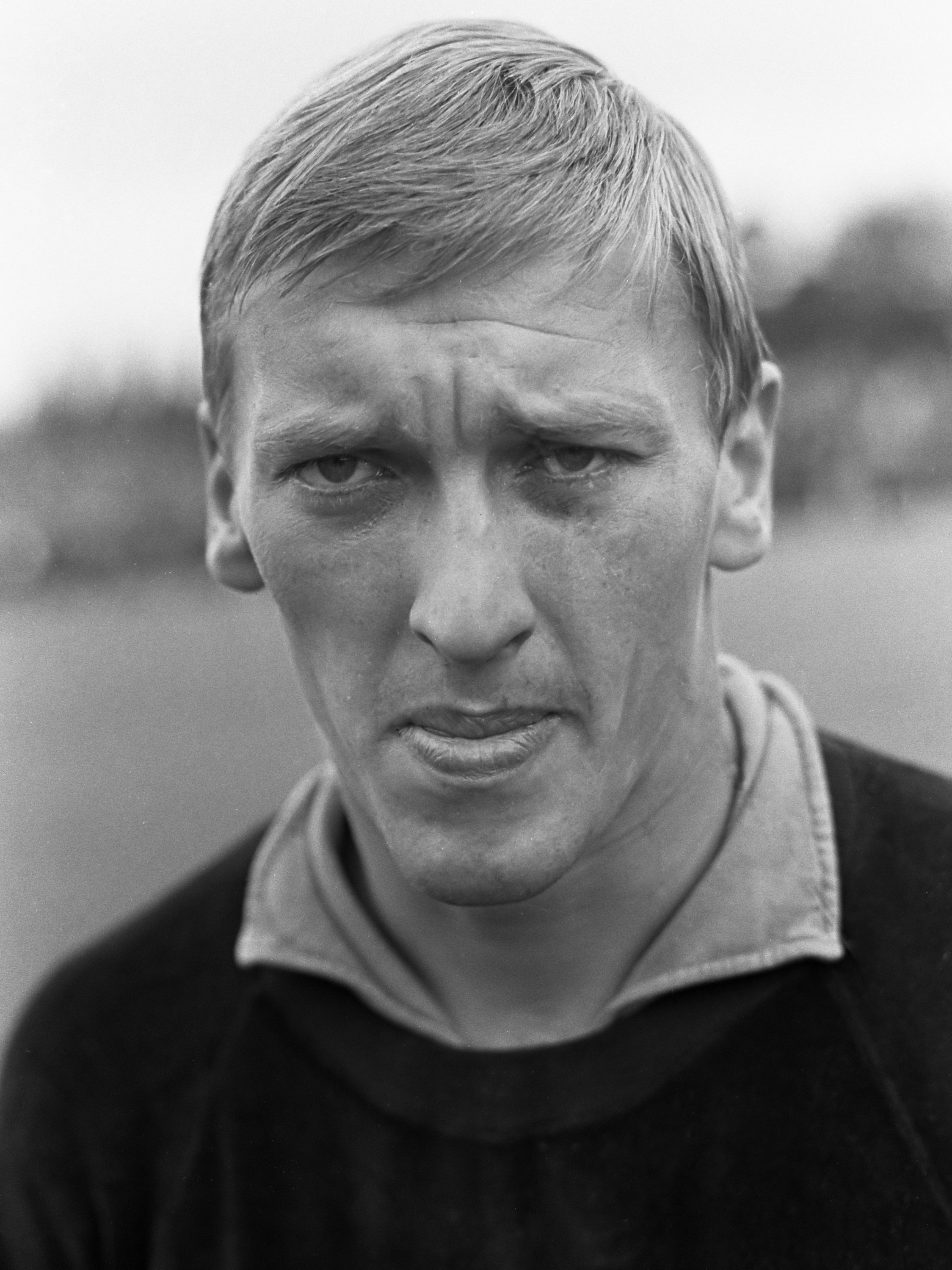
- Doesburg in 1967

Personal information
- Full name: Willem Doesburg
- Date of birth: 28 October 1943
- Place of birth: Rotterdam, Netherlands
- Date of death: 18 November 2020 (aged 77)
- Place of death: Berkel en Rodenrijs, Netherlands
- Height: 1.86 m (6 ft 1 in)
- Position: Goalkeeper

Senior career*
Years	Team	Apps	(Gls)
1962–1967	Sparta	137	(0)
1967–1970	PSV	93	(0)
1970–1980	Sparta	334	(0)
1980–1987	PSV	123	(0)
Total		687	(0)

International career
1967–1981	Netherlands	8	(0)
Medal record
Representing Netherlands
FIFA World Cup
Runner-up	1978 Argentina
- * Club domestic league appearances and goals

Willem "Pim" Doesburg (Dutch pronunciation: [ˈʋɪləm ˈpɪm ˈduzbʏr(ə)x]; 28 October 1943 – 18 November 2020) was a footballer who played as a goalkeeper. He obtained eight caps for the Netherlands national team from 1967 to 1981. Doesburg is the Eredivisie record holder for matches played, with 687 games in a 25-year career.

== Club career ==
Doesburg made his senior debut for Sparta Rotterdam in August 1962 against Blauw-Wit and played 471 Eredivisie matches for them in two spells with the club and won the 1966 KNVB Cup. He also played over 200 games for PSV Eindhoven, winning the Dutch title twice (1986 and 1987).

== International career ==
Doesburg made his debut for the Netherlands in an April 1967 friendly match against Belgium and earned eight caps. He played one match at the 1980 European Championships versus Greece in Naples, coming on as a substitute to replace Piet Schrijvers in the 15th minute of a 1–0 win. His final international game was in February 1981 against Cyprus.

== Personal life ==
Doesburg was born on 28 October 1943 in Rotterdam, South Holland. After his career ended, he became a keepers coach, and worked for Feyenoord. He started a couple of sports shops in Rotterdam and Berkel en Rodenrijs, where he lived. The shops, by then run by his sons Pim and Danny, went bankrupt in 2020.

He died on 17 November 2020 at the age of 77 after suffering from COVID-19. His grandson Pepijn Doesburg also became a professional footballer. He credited his grandfather with passing on advice around the mental toughness required to play professionally which helped Pepijn with the mentality required to help overcome injuries in his career.

== Honours ==
Sparta

- KNVB Cup: 1965–66

PSV Eindhoven

- Eredivisie: 1985–86, 1986–87
