= Rick Ketting =

Dutch footballer (born 1996)

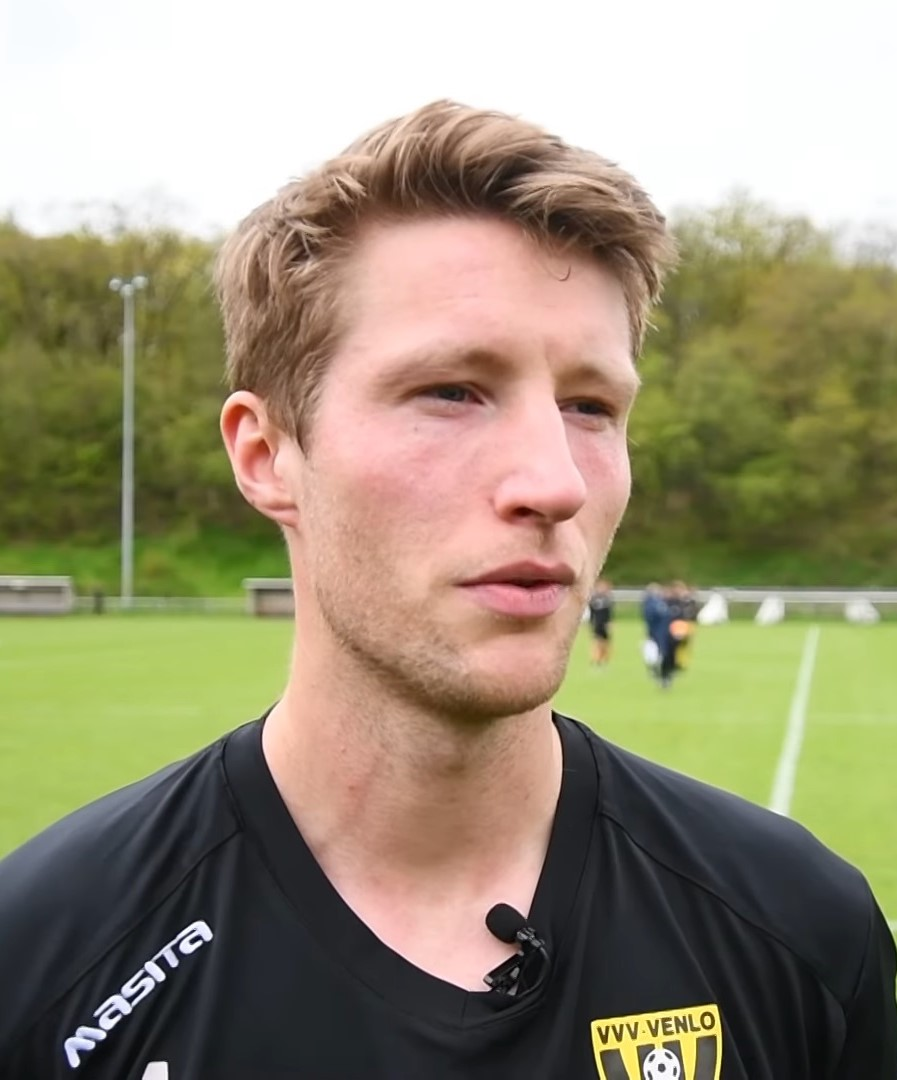
- Ketting in 2023

Personal information
- Date of birth: 15 January 1996 (age 30)
- Place of birth: Nieuwerkerk aan den IJssel, Netherlands
- Height: 1.88 m (6 ft 2 in)
- Position: Centre-back

Team information
- Current team: Phnom Penh Crown
- Number: 4

Youth career
- 2000–2006: VV Nieuwerkerk
- 2006–2014: Sparta Rotterdam

Senior career*
Years	Team	Apps	(Gls)
2014–2017	Sparta Rotterdam	44	(1)
2016–2017	Jong Sparta	20	(1)
2017–2019	Go Ahead Eagles	31	(2)
2019	IFK Mariehamn	29	(4)
2020–2022	Inter Turku	57	(5)
2022–2025	VVV-Venlo	103	(9)
2025–	Phnom Penh Crown	20	(1)

International career
2015–2016	Netherlands U20	2	(2)
- * Club domestic league appearances and goals as of 9 November 2026

Rick Ketting (born 15 January 1996) is a Dutch professional footballer who plays as a centre-back for Phnom Penh Crown. Besides the Netherlands, he has played in Finland.

== Club career ==
Ketting joined Sparta Rotterdam at the age of 10 from his childhood club VV Nieuwerkerk and progressed through the entire youth academy of the club.

On 1 February 2019, Ketting joined Finnish club IFK Mariehamn on a one-year contract. On 12 January 2020, Ketting signed for Inter Turku. On 2 February 2022, he returned to Inter Turku for the 2022 season.

Ketting returned to the Netherlands on 20 July 2022, signing a three-year contract with Eerste Divisie club VVV-Venlo. During the 2023–24 Eerste Divisie season, he began a prolific goalscoring run, finishing the first half of the campaign as the division's highest-scoring defender. Upon the expiry of his contract at the end of the 2024–25 season, VVV-Venlo opted not to renew, and Ketting departed as a free agent.

In June 2025, Ketting signed with Phnom Penh Crown FC of the Cambodian Premier League.

== International career ==
Ketting was called up for the Netherlands under-20s by coach Remy Reynierse for a friendly against Czech Republic on 14 November 2015. He scored a brace, securing a 2–2 draw at Městský fotbalový stadion Srbská. His two goals made him the top goalscorer for the under-20s for 2015.

== Career statistics ==
As of match played 9 May 2025

Appearances and goals by club, season and competition
Club	Season	League			National cup (Note: Includes KNVB Cup, Finnish Cup)		League cup (Note: Includes Finnish League Cup)		Europe		Other		Total	
Club	Season	Division	Apps	Goals	Apps	Goals	Apps	Goals	Apps	Goals	Apps	Goals	Apps	Goals
Sparta Rotterdam	2014–15	Eerste Divisie	18	0	0	0	—		—		—		18	0
Sparta Rotterdam	2015–16	Eerste Divisie	25	1	2	0	—		—		—		27	1
Sparta Rotterdam	2016–17	Eredivisie	1	0	1	0	—		—		—		2	0
Sparta Rotterdam	Total		44	1	3	0	—		—		—		47	1
Jong Sparta	2016–17	Tweede Divisie	20	1	—		—		—		—		20	1
Go Ahead Eagles	2018–19	Eerste Divisie	31	2	1	0	—		—		—		32	2
Go Ahead Eagles	2019–20	Eerste Divisie	0	0	0	0	—		—		—		0	0
Go Ahead Eagles	Total		31	2	1	0	—		—		—		32	2
IFK Mariehamn	2019	Veikkausliiga	29	4	7	0	—		—		—		36	4
Inter Turku	2020	Veikkausliiga	21	2	7	1	—		1 (Note: Appearance in UEFA Europa League)	0	—		29	3
Inter Turku	2021	Veikkausliiga	23	0	2	0	—		2 (Note: Appearances in UEFA Europa Conference League)	0	—		27	0
Inter Turku	2022	Veikkausliiga	13	3	3	0	5	1	2	0	—		23	4
Inter Turku	Total		57	5	12	1	5	1	5	0	—		79	7
VVV-Venlo	2022–23	Eerste Divisie	38	3	2	0	—		—		4 (Note: Appearances in Eredivisie promotion/relegation playoffs)	0	44	3
VVV-Venlo	2023–24	Eerste Divisie	37	5	1	0	—		—		—		38	5
VVV-Venlo	2024–25	Eerste Divisie	28	1	0	0	—		—		—		28	1
VVV-Venlo	Total		103	9	3	0	—		—		4	0	110	9
Career total			284	22	26	1	5	1	5	0	4	0	324	24

== Honours ==
Individual

- Veikkausliiga Team of the Year: 2020
