= Lasse Wehmeyer =

German footballer (born 2005)

Personal information
- Date of birth: 18 September 2002 (age 24)
- Place of birth: Burgsteinfurt, Germany
- Height: 1.77 m (5 ft 10 in)
- Position: Winger

Team information
- Current team: Middelfart
- Number: 39

Youth career
- 2008–2013: SV Burgsteinfurt
- 2013–2020: Twente
- 2020–2022: Twente/Heracles Academy

Senior career*
Years	Team	Apps	(Gls)
2022–2024	Heracles Almelo	27	(4)
2024–2026	VVV-Venlo	61	(4)
2026–	Middelfart	5	(2)
- * Club domestic league appearances and goals as of 22:43, 5 September 2026 (UTC)

Lasse Wehmeyer (born 18 September 2002) is a German professional footballer who plays as a winger for Danish 2nd Division club Middelfart.

== Career ==
=== Heracles Almelo ===
Wehmeyer grew up in Burgsteinfurt, North Rhine-Westphalia. He developed in the youth ranks of SV Burgsteinfurt before joining the Twente/Heracles Academy in 2013. In late September 2022, he was named in the matchday squad of Heracles Almelo for the first time, ahead of the Eerste Divisie fixture against FC Den Bosch. He made his professional debut in that match, coming on as a substitute in the closing minutes of a 2–1 away victory. Wehmeyer entered the pitch four minutes from time under head coach John Lammers, replacing Samuel Armenteros.

Following his debut, Wehmeyer was permanently promoted to the first-team squad in October 2022. In December 2022, he signed his first professional contract with the club, committing himself until mid-2025 with an option for an additional year.

On 3 February 2023, Wehmeyer scored his first professional goals, netting twice after coming on as a substitute in a 6–1 home victory over Jong Utrecht.

At the end of the season, Heracles Almelo were promoted to the Eredivisie as champions of the Eerste Divisie. During his first professional campaign, Wehmeyer made 20 league appearances. Following promotion, his playing time at the top level was more limited, as he featured in seven league matches during the subsequent Eredivisie season.

=== VVV-Venlo ===
In June 2024, Wehmeyer's contract with Heracles was terminated. He subsequently joined Eerste Divisie club VVV-Venlo on a free transfer, signing a two-year contract with an option for an additional season and reuniting with former Heracles head coach John Lammers. He made his competitive debut for the club on 10 August, the opening matchday of the 2024–25 season, starting in a 1–1 away draw against ADO Den Haag. On 13 December, he scored his first goal for the club in a 3–1 away victory against Eindhoven.

=== Middelfart ===
On 30 June 2026, Wehmeyer signed a two-year contract with Danish 2nd Division club Middelfart.

== Career statistics ==
As of match played 29 August 2026

Appearances and goals by club, season and competition
Club	Season	League			National cup		Other		Total	
Club	Season	Division	Apps	Goals	Apps	Goals	Apps	Goals	Apps	Goals
Heracles Almelo	2022–23	Eerste Divisie	20	4	2	0	—		22	4
Heracles Almelo	2023–24	Eredivisie	7	0	1	0	—		8	0
Heracles Almelo	Total		27	4	3	0	—		30	4
VVV-Venlo	2024–25	Eerste Divisie	34	3	0	0	—		34	3
VVV-Venlo	2025–26	Eerste Divisie	27	1	1	0	—		28	1
VVV-Venlo	Total		61	4	1	0	—		62	4
Middelfart	2026–27	Danish 2nd Division	5	2	2	0	—		7	2
Career total			93	10	6	0	0	0	99	10

== Honours ==
Heracles Almelo

- Eerste Divisie: 2022–23
