= Konstantinos Doumtsios =

Greek footballer (born 1997)

Personal information
- Date of birth: 20 September 1997 (age 29)
- Place of birth: Serres, Greece
- Height: 1.85 m (6 ft 1 in)
- Position: Striker

Team information
- Current team: PAS Pyrgos
- Number: 9

Youth career
- –2015: Serres
- 2015–2017: Iraklis

Senior career*
Years	Team	Apps	(Gls)
2015	Serres	10	(0)
2017	Iraklis	0	(0)
2017–2018	Panserraikos	29	(4)
2018–2019	Aiginiakos	7	(2)
2019	Doxa Drama	17	(6)
2019–2020	Panionios	13	(0)
2020–2021	Karaiskakis	27	(3)
2021–2023	Levadiakos	45	(6)
2023–2024	TOP Oss	36	(6)
2024–2025	VVV-Venlo	23	(3)
2025	Den Bosch	7	(1)
2025–2026	Petrolul Ploiești	17	(1)
2026	→ Chindia Târgoviște (loan)	14	(3)
2026–	PAS Pyrgos	4	(0)
- * Club domestic league appearances and goals as of 27 September 2026

Konstantinos "Kostas" Doumtsios (Greek: Κωνσταντίνος "Κώστας" Δούμτσιος; born 20 September 1997) is a Greek professional footballer who plays as a striker for Super League Greece 2 club PAS Pyrgos.

== Career ==
Doumtsios hails from Ano Poroia, Serres. He began his football career in the youth system of Serres, making his debut for the first team on 15 February 2015 in a second-tier Football League match against Lamia, which ended in a 2–0 defeat. During his time at Serres, he trialled with Belgian club Genk. At the end of the season, he was signed by Iraklis. However, he made no official appearances for the team over the following two years.

Between 2017 and 2019, he played in the second division for Panserraikos, Aiginiakos, and Doxa Drama. In 2019, he joined Panionios, making his debut in the Super League Greece on 25 August 2019 in a match against Volos, which ended in a 2–1 defeat. His debut top-tier season included 15 appearances and one goal across league and cup competitions. Following the club's insolvency, he moved on a free transfer to Karaiskakis in September 2020. In July 2021, Levadiakos signed him on a two-year contract, and the club won the Super League 2 championship at the end of the 2021–22 season.

On 3 August 2023, Doumtsios signed a one-year contract with an option for an additional year with Dutch Eerste Divisie club TOP Oss. He expressed his joy about his move to Dutch football: "Dutch football has appealed to me as a fan of the sport from a very young age. The ambition to play in the Netherlands followed shortly thereafter. I've worked hard towards taking this step." He scored six goals in 37 appearances for the club. His performances earned him a move to VVV-Venlo on 26 June 2024, where he signed a two-year contract with an option for an additional season. Upon signing, he cited fellow Greek and former Eredivisie top goalscorer for VVV, Giorgos Giakoumakis, as an inspiration.

On 3 February 2025, Doumtsios signed a one-and-a-half-season deal with Den Bosch.

In the summer of 2025, Doumtsios joined Romanian club Petrolul Ploieşti on a two-year contract. During the winter break, he was loaned to Liga II side Chindia Târgovişte.

On 28 July 2026, Doumtsios signed for PAS Pyrgos on a free transfer.

== Style of play ==
Doumtsios has been described as a "physically strong" striker who plays with high energy and intensity.

== Personal life ==
Doumtsios grew up as a fan of Cristiano Ronaldo and is a supporter of Real Madrid.

== Honours ==
Levadiakos

- Super League 2: 2021–22
