= Emmanuel Gyamfi =

Ghanaian footballer

Personal information
- Date of birth: 16 December 1994 (age 31)
- Place of birth: Kumasi, Ghana
- Height: 1.78 m (5 ft 10 in)
- Position: Winger

Team information
- Current team: Asante Kotoko

Senior career*
Years	Team	Apps	(Gls)
2013–2014	Wa All Stars		
2014–2015	Shirak	9	(1)
2016–	Asante Kotoko	68	(5)

International career^{‡}
2017–	Ghana	3	(0)
- * Club domestic league appearances and goals as of 23:00, 15 July 2020 (UTC) ‡ National team caps and goals as of 23:00, 15 July 2020 (UTC)

Emmanuel Gyamfi (born 16 December 1994) is a Ghanaian footballer who plays as a winger for Asante Kotoko and Ghana.

== Club career ==
Gyamfi started his career Wa All Stars. In 2014, Gyamfi signed for Armenian club Shirak, making 9 appearances in the Armenian Premier League, scoring once. Ahead of the 2016 Ghanaian Premier League, Gyamfi returned to his native Ghana, signing for Asante Kotoko, making 12 appearances in his first season back in the division.

== International career ==
On 25 May 2017, Gyamfi made his debut for Ghana in a 1–1 draw against Benin.
