= Milan Robberechts =

Belgian footballer (born 2004)

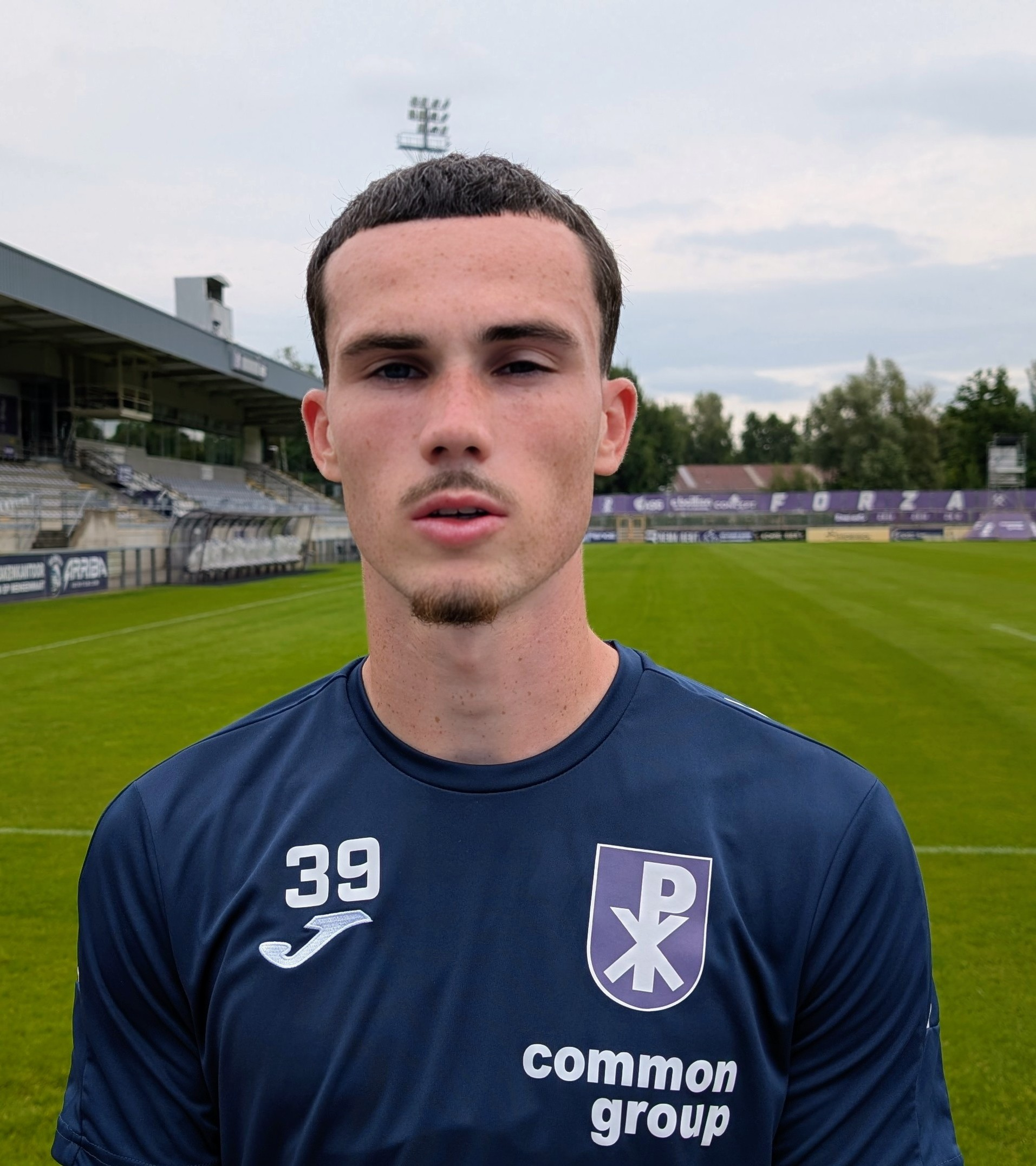

Personal information
- Date of birth: 4 March 2004 (age 22)
- Place of birth: Vilvoorde, Belgium
- Height: 1.81 m (5 ft 11 in)
- Position: Winger

Team information
- Current team: Club NXT
- Number: 39

Youth career
- Grimbergen
- 2014–2022: Mechelen

Senior career*
Years	Team	Apps	(Gls)
2022–2023	Mechelen	3	(2)
2022–2023	Jong KVM	17	(2)
2023–2025	Fortuna Sittard	12	(1)
2024	→ VVV-Venlo (loan)	10	(1)
2024–2025	→ RSCA Futures (loan)	23	(3)
2025–2026	Patro Eisden Maasmechelen	31	(4)
2026–	Club NXT	6	(4)
2026–	Club Brugge KV	1	(0)

International career^{‡}
2021	Belgium U18	2	(0)
- * Club domestic league appearances and goals as of 31 October 2026 ‡ National team caps and goals as of 03:10, 22 August 2022 (UTC)

Milan Robberechts (born 4 March 2004) is a Belgian professional footballer who plays as a winger for Challenger Pro League club Club NXT.

== Career ==
Robberechts is a youth product of the academy of Grimbergen, and moved to Mechelen's youth side in 2014. He signed his first professional contract with Mechelen on 28 July 2021 for 3 years. made his professional debut with Mechelen in a 5–4 Belgian First Division A win over Westerlo on 21 August 2022; coming on as a substitute in the 71st minute while Mechelen was trailing 2–4, he scored a brace that ultimately gave Mechelen the comeback win.

On 3 July 2023, Robberechts moved to Fortuna Sittard in the Netherlands on a two-year contract with an optional third year. On 30 January 2024, Robberechts was loaned by VVV-Venlo.

On 5 September 2024, Robberechts joined RSCA Futures (the reserve team of Anderlecht) on loan with an option to buy.

On 14 June 2025, Robberechts moved to Patro Eisden Maasmechelen.

On 8 July 2026, he moved to Club Brugge with a four-year contract and was assigned to their reserve team Club NXT.

== International career ==
Robberechts is a youth international for Belgium, having played for the Belgium U18s in 2018.

== Career statistics ==
As of match played 31 October 2026

Appearances and goals by club, season and competition
Club	Season	League			Cup		Europe		Other		Total	
Club	Season	Division	Apps	Goals	Apps	Goals	Apps	Goals	Apps	Goals	Apps	Goals
Mechelen	2022–23	Belgian Pro League	3	2	1	0	—		—		4	2
Jong KVM	2022–23	Belgian Division 2	17	2	—		—		—		17	2
Fortuna Sittard	2023–24	Eredivisie	10	1	1	0	—		—		11	1
Fortuna Sittard	2024–25	Eredivisie	2	0	—		—		—		2	0
Fortuna Sittard	Total		12	1	1	0	—		—		13	1
VVV-Venlo (loan)	2023–24	Eerste Divisie	10	1	—		—		—		10	1
RSCA Futures (loan)	2024–25	Challenger Pro League	23	3	—		—		—		23	3
Club NXT	2026–27	Challenger Pro League	6	4	—		—		—		6	4
Club Brugge	2026–27	Belgian Pro League	1	0	1	0	1 (Note: Appearances in UEFA Champions League)	0	—		3	0
Career total			72	13	3	0	1	0	0	0	76	13
