= Elias Sierra =

Belgian footballer (born 2001)

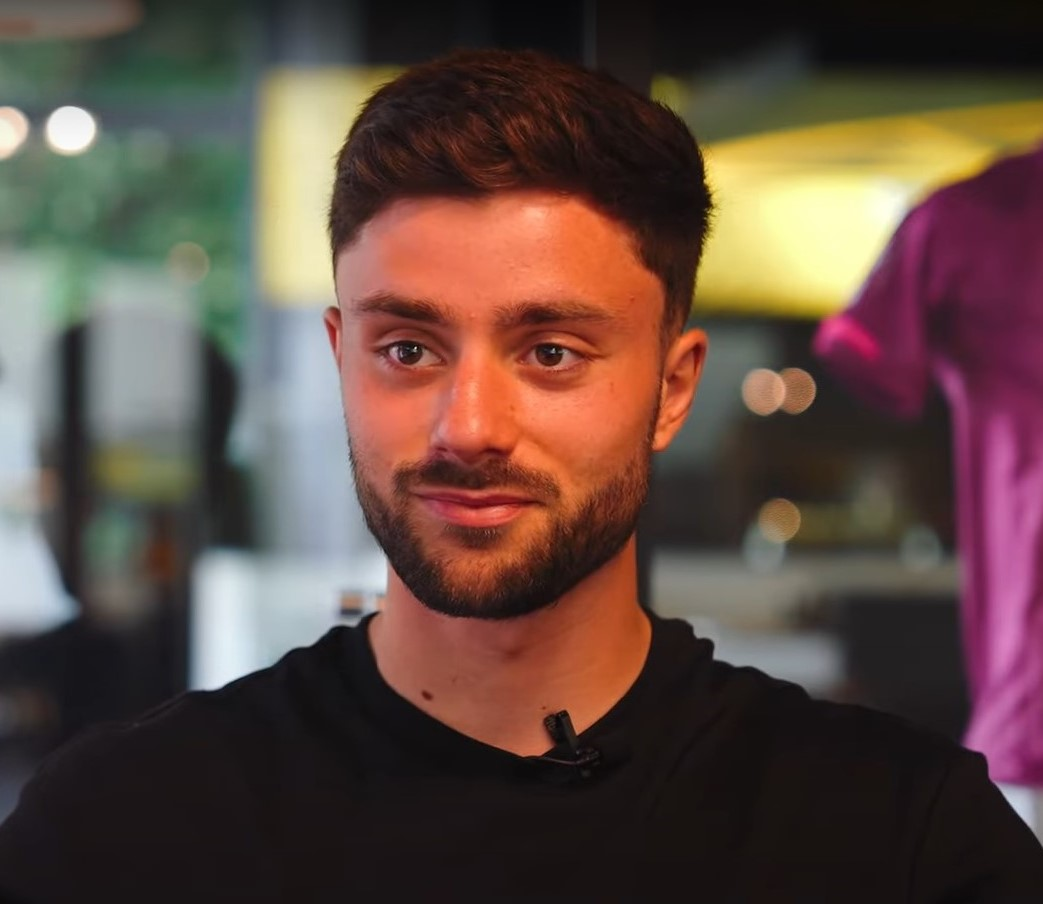
- Sierra in 2023

Personal information
- Full name: Elias Sierra-Cappelleti
- Date of birth: 25 August 2001 (age 25)
- Place of birth: Hasselt, Belgium
- Height: 1.70 m (5 ft 7 in)
- Position: Midfielder

Team information
- Current team: MVV
- Number: 18

Youth career
- 2007–2008: Melosport Zonhoven
- 2008–2009: Sporting Hasselt
- 2009–2020: KRC Genk

Senior career*
Years	Team	Apps	(Gls)
2020–2021	KRC Genk	1	(0)
2021–2023	Heracles Almelo	38	(0)
2023–2025	VVV-Venlo	72	(5)
2026	Sporting Hasselt	10	(0)
2026–	MVV	8	(2)

International career^{‡}
2015–2016	Belgium U15	6	(1)
2017–2018	Belgium U17	12	(0)
2018–2019	Belgium U18	7	(0)
2020	Belgium U19	1	(0)
- * Club domestic league appearances and goals as of 2 May 2026 ‡ National team caps and goals as of 8 September 2020

Elias Sierra-Cappelleti (born 25 August 2001) is a Belgian professional footballer who plays as a midfielder for Eerste Divisie club MVV.

== Club career ==
=== Genk ===
==== Early years ====
Sierra, with a Spanish grandfather and an Italian grandmother on his father's side, was born in Hasselt, Belgium, and spent his early years in Zonhoven. He started playing football at local club Melosport Zonhoven and later moved to Sporting Hasselt, following in the footsteps of his older brother. While at Sporting Hasselt, scouts from KRC Genk noticed his talent, and he joined Genk's under-8 team after just one season.

Sierra continued his development through Genk's youth teams and signed his first professional contract in August 2017, at the age of sixteen. In the 2019–20 season, he played with Genk's youth team in the UEFA Youth League.

==== First team ====
During the 2019–20 season's winter break, first-team coach Hannes Wolf selected Sierra for winter training camp in Benidorm. Sierra's exceptional performance during this period earned him a permanent place in the first team, and his contract was extended until 2023. He was assigned jersey number 16. On 13 February 2020, he appeared on the bench for the first time in the away match against Antwerp. Sierra made his official debut for the first team on 14 September 2020, during the league match against Beerschot, replacing Eboue Kouassi in the 81st minute as Genk were defeated 5–2.

Following the death of former Genk player Anele Ngcongca in November 2020, Genk decided to change Sierra's jersey number to 19, as they opted not to assign the number 16 to any other player out of respect for Ngcongca.

Sierra made only one senior appearance for Genk, before leaving the club in January 2021.

=== Heracles Almelo ===
On 1 February 2021, Sierra completed a permanent transfer to Heracles Almelo, signing a contract until 2024. He made his debut for the club on 4 April 2021, replacing Orestis Kiomourtzoglou in the 65th minute of a 3–0 loss to PSV.

Sierra faced challenges in meeting expectations during his time at Heracles. Over one and a half seasons in the Eredivisie, he earned five starts and came on as a substitute in 16 matches. Following the club's relegation in 2022, he made 17 brief substitute appearances in the Eerste Divisie. Despite an ongoing contract, he was told to find a new club.

=== VVV-Venlo ===
On 25 July 2023, Sierra signed a two-year contract with VVV-Venlo in Eerste Divisie, with an option for an additional season. He made his debut for the club on the first matchday of the season, starting and playing 65 minute of a 3–1 Limburg derby loss to MVV. On 15 December, he scored his first competitive goal for VVV in a 2–1 league loss against TOP Oss.

He remained with the club through the 2024–25 season. Upon the expiry of his contract, VVV-Venlo opted not to renew, and Sierra left the club as a free agent.

=== Sporting Hasselt ===
In January 2026, after six months as a free agent, Sierra returned to his hometown to join his youth club Sporting Hasselt, then playing in Belgian Division 1, the third tier of Belgian football. Hasselt won promotion to the Challenger Pro League at the end of the season, but Sierra left on a free transfer that summer rather than remain with the club.

=== MVV ===
On 24 June 2026, Sierra returned to Dutch football, signing a one-year contract with an option for a further season at Eerste Divisie club MVV. He joined on a free transfer, and the club's technical manager Ronny Van Geneugden said that Sierra's qualities would add creativity to the midfield.

Sierra scored on his competitive debut for the club on the opening day of the 2026–27 season. Jong FC Utrecht had cancelled out an early MVV lead at De Geusselt, and after seeing one effort cleared off the line Sierra scored shortly after half-time from a move down the right to settle a 2–1 win.

== International career ==
Born in Belgium, Sierra is of Spanish and Italian descent. He is a youth international for Belgium.

== Career statistics ==
=== Club ===
As of match played 26 September 2026

Appearances and goals by club, season and competition
Club	Season	League			National cup		Other		Total	
Club	Season	Division	Apps	Goals	Apps	Goals	Apps	Goals	Apps	Goals
KRC Genk	2020–21	Belgian First Division A	1	0	0	0	—		1	0
Heracles Almelo	2020–21	Eredivisie	5	0	—		—		5	0
Heracles Almelo	2021–22	Eredivisie	16	0	0	0	1 (Note: Appearance in Eredivisie promotion/relegation playoffs)	0	17	0
Heracles Almelo	2022–23	Eerste Divisie	17	0	2	1	—		19	1
Heracles Almelo	Total		38	0	2	1	1	0	41	1
VVV-Venlo	2023–24	Eerste Divisie	38	3	1	0	—		39	3
VVV-Venlo	2024–25	Eerste Divisie	34	2	1	0	—		35	2
VVV-Venlo	Total		72	5	2	0	—		74	5
Sporting Hasselt	2025–26	Belgian Division 1	10	0	—		—		10	0
MVV	2026–27	Eerste Divisie	8	2	0	0	—		8	2
Career total			129	7	4	1	1	0	134	8

== Honours ==
Heracles Almelo

- Eerste Divisie: 2022–23
