= Sylian Mokono =

Dutch footballer (born 1999)

Personal information
- Full name: Sylian Aldren Mokono
- Date of birth: 22 March 1999 (age 27)
- Place of birth: Utrecht, Netherlands
- Height: 1.88 m (6 ft 2 in)
- Position: Right-back

Team information
- Current team: Prishtina
- Number: 2

Youth career
- USV Elinkwijk
- –2018: Utrecht

Senior career*
Years	Team	Apps	(Gls)
2018–2022	Jong Utrecht	66	(3)
2020–2022	Utrecht	3	(0)
2022–2024	Heracles Almelo	10	(1)
2024–2026	VVV-Venlo	37	(3)
2026–	Prishtina	15	(0)
- * Club domestic league appearances and goals as of 22 June 2026

Sylian Aldren Mokono (born 22 March 1999) is a Dutch professional footballer who plays as a right-back for Kosovo Superleague club Prishtina.

== Club career ==
He made his Eerste Divisie debut for Jong FC Utrecht on 27 August 2018 in a game against NEC, as a 63rd-minute substitute for Rick Mulder.

He made his Eredivisie debut for FC Utrecht on 29 November 2020 in a game against Feyenoord.

On 20 July 2022, Mokono signed a three-year contract with Heracles Almelo. On 2 September 2024, his Heracles contract was terminated by mutual consent.

On 7 November 2024, Mokono signed with VVV-Venlo on a contract running until the end of the 2024–25 Eerste Divisie season. He made his debut shortly afterwards in a league match against Jong AZ. At the end of the campaign, Mokono declined an offer to extend his contract, and subsequently left the club as a free agent. However, on 22 August 2025 Mokono returned to VVV-Venlo on a two-season deal.

On 15 January 2026, Mokona signed with Kosovo Superleague club Prishtina.

== Personal life ==
Born in the Netherlands, Mokono is of South African descent.
