= Dylan Timber =

Curaçao footballer (born 2000)

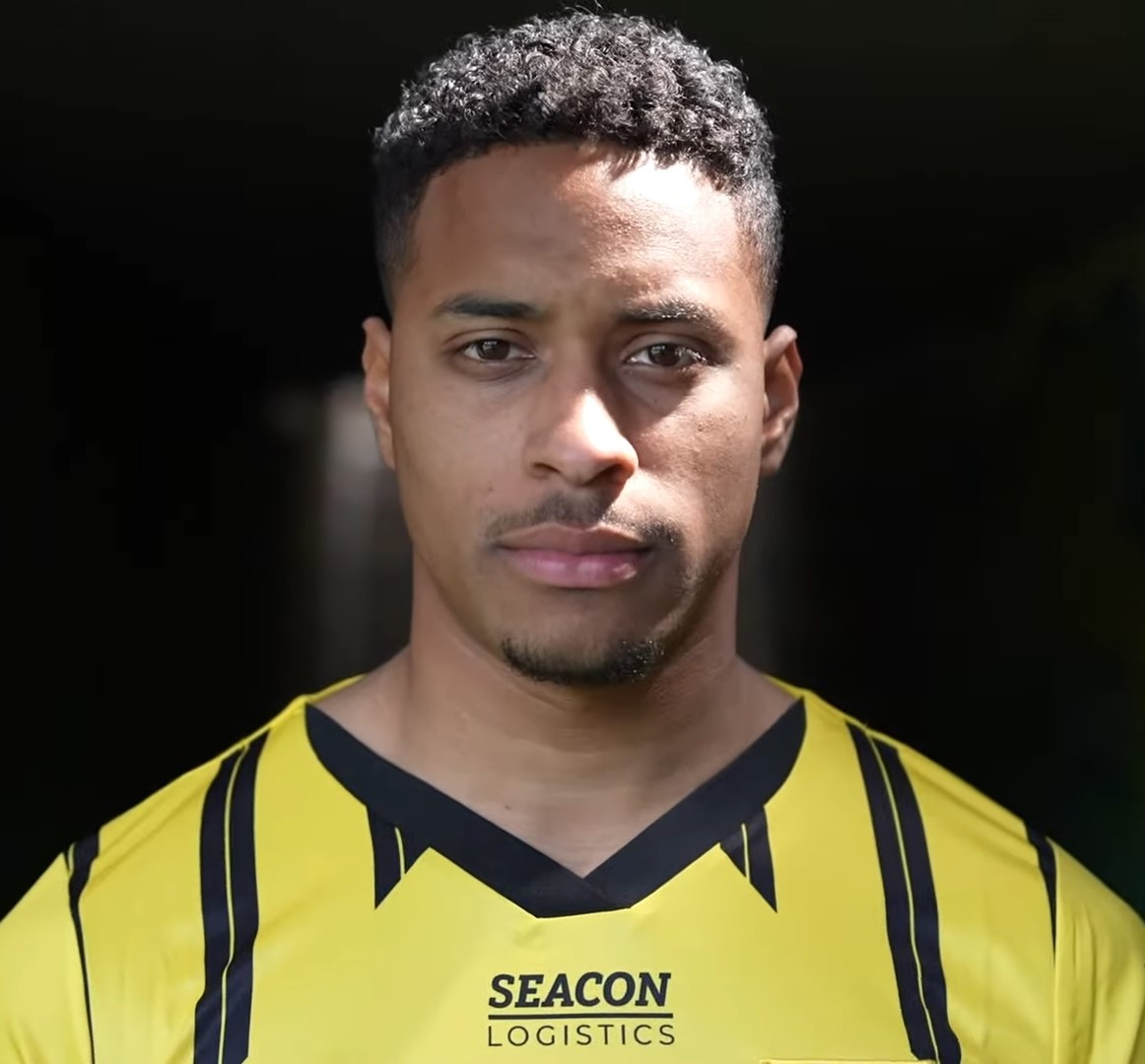
- Timber in 2023

Personal information
- Date of birth: 15 April 2000 (age 26)
- Place of birth: Utrecht, Netherlands
- Positions: Centre-back; right-back

Team information
- Current team: MVV Maastricht
- Number: 4

Youth career
- 2006–2008: DVSU Utrecht
- 2008–2010: Feyenoord
- 2010–2011: DVSU Utrecht
- 2011–2012: Kampong
- 2012–2013: Houten
- 2013–2020: Kampong
- 2020–2021: Sparta Nijkerk
- 2021–2022: Utrecht

Senior career*
Years	Team	Apps	(Gls)
2020–2021	Sparta Nijkerk	1	(3)
2022–2023	Jong Utrecht	19	(0)
2023–2026	VVV-Venlo	17	(1)
2026–	MVV Maastricht	0	(0)

International career^{‡}
2022–	Curaçao	1	(0)
- * Club domestic league appearances and goals as of 3 October 2026 ‡ National team caps and goals as of 06:32, 25 September 2022 (UTC)

Dylan Galdino Junior Timber (born 15 April 2000) is a professional footballer who plays as a centre-back or right-back for Eerste Divisie club MVV Maastricht. He is the older brother of two younger twins Jurriën Timber and Quinten Timber who are also professional footballers. Born in the Netherlands, he represents the Curaçao national team at the international level.

== Club career ==
=== Early years ===
Timber is a youth product of DVSU Utrecht, Feyenoord, Kampong, Houten and Sparta Nijkerk. On 11 May 2022, he signed with Jong Utrecht on a two-year contract.

=== VVV ===
On 4 May 2023, Timber signed a three-year contract with Eerste Divisie club VVV. On 20 October 2023, Timber made his first start for the club in an away match against Den Bosch, a 2–1 victory, replacing the suspended Roel Janssen. During the match, he scored his first goal in professional football.

On 26 January 2024, Timber suffered a serious injury during a 3–2 away defeat to De Graafschap. Subsequent medical examinations confirmed a rupture of the anterior cruciate ligament, ruling him out for several months. As of December 2025, Timber has not made a further first-team appearance for VVV following his anterior cruciate ligament injury.

=== MVV Maastricht ===
In the summer 2026, Timber signed a one-season contract with MVV Maastricht.

== International career ==
Born in the mainland Netherlands, Timber was called up to the Curaçao national team for a set of friendlies in September 2022. He debuted with Curaçao in a friendly 3–2 loss to Indonesia on 25 September 2022.

== Personal life ==
Born in the Netherlands, Timber is of Curaçaoan descent. Both his mother Marilyn and his father hail from Curaçao, part of the ABC Islands in the Dutch Caribbean. Due to situations in the past, the family took on their maternal name Timber instead of taking the last name of their father, Maduro. He has four brothers: Shamier, Chris and twins Quinten and Jurriën.
