= Martijn Berden =

Dutch footballer (born 1997)

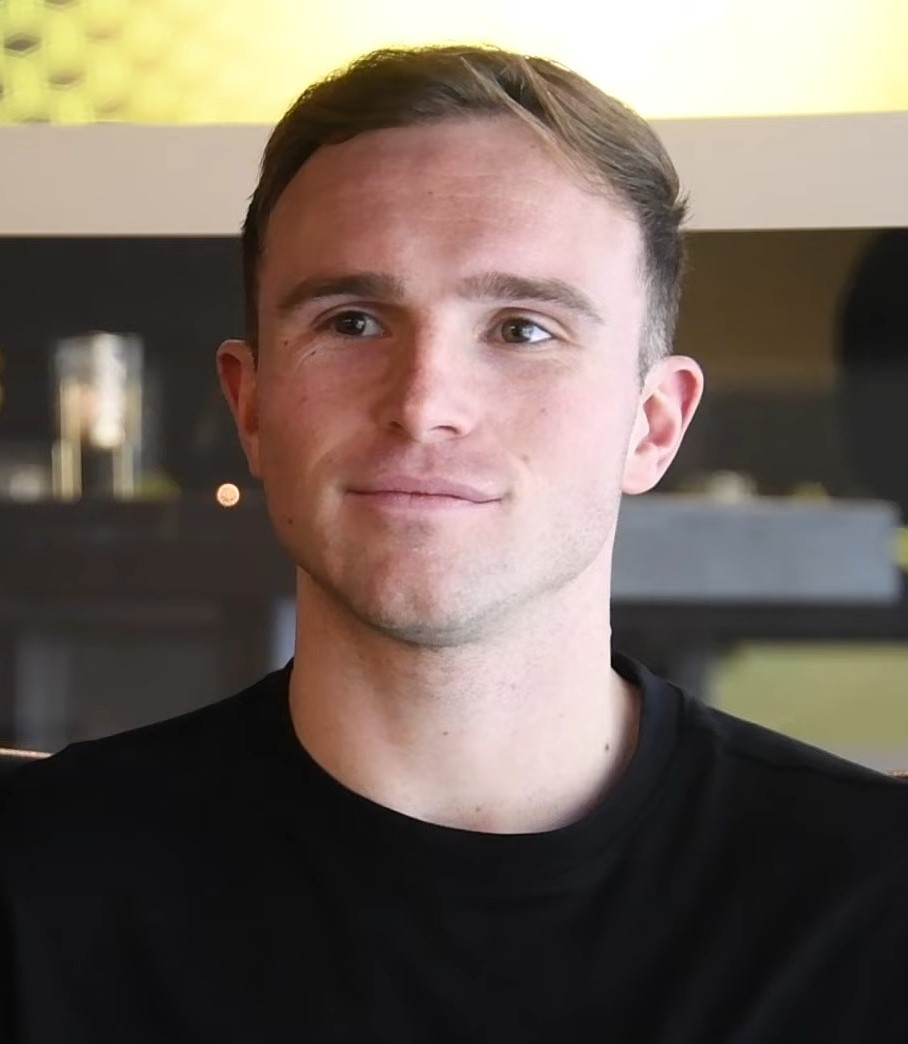
- Berden in 2023

Personal information
- Date of birth: 29 July 1997 (age 29)
- Place of birth: The Hague, Netherlands
- Height: 1.72 m (5 ft 8 in)
- Position: Right winger

Youth career
- –2009: VV Zeewolde
- 2009–2011: Vitesse
- 2011–2016: PSV
- 2016–2017: Vitesse

Senior career*
Years	Team	Apps	(Gls)
2015–2016	Jong PSV	1	(0)
2016–2019	Jong Vitesse	38	(7)
2019–2023	Go Ahead Eagles	63	(6)
2023	→ VVV-Venlo (loan)	12	(2)
2023–2025	VVV-Venlo	60	(7)
2025	GVVV		

International career
2012	Netherlands U15	1	(0)
2013	Netherlands U16	2	(0)
2014–2015	Netherlands U18	7	(0)
2015–2016	Netherlands U19	4	(0)
- * Club domestic league appearances and goals as of 15 May 2025

Martijn Berden (born 29 July 1997) is a Dutch retired footballer who plays as a winger. (Note: Martijn Berden at Soccerway)

== Club career ==
Berden made his professional debut as Jong PSV player in the second division on 18 September 2015 against Sparta Rotterdam. He replaced Moussa Sanoh after 65 minutes. After spell with PSV, Berden returned to Vitesse in July 2016.

On 31 January 2023, Berden joined VVV-Venlo in Eerste Divisie on loan until the end of the season, with an option to buy. The club announced that they had activated the option to buy on 3 May, signing a two-year contract. He remained with the club through the 2024–25 season. Upon the expiry of his contract, VVV-Venlo opted not to renew, and Berden left the club as a free agent.

Berden retired in January 2026 after a short spell with GVVV.

== Honours ==
Jong Vitesse

- Derde Divisie – Sunday: 2017–18
