= Pepijn Doesburg =

Dutch footballer (born 2001)

Personal information
- Date of birth: 17 January 2001 (age 25)
- Place of birth: Rotterdam, Netherlands
- Height: 1.89 m (6 ft 2 in)
- Position: Forward

Team information
- Current team: Trenčín
- Number: 99

Youth career
- 2007–2009: TOGB
- 2009–2017: Feyenoord
- 2017–2019: Sparta Rotterdam

Senior career*
Years	Team	Apps	(Gls)
2019–2022	Jong Sparta	48	(9)
2022–2024	Dordrecht	24	(2)
2023–2024	→ VVV-Venlo (loan)	33	(6)
2024	VVV-Venlo	18	(2)
2025–2026	Trenčín	37	(3)
- * Club domestic league appearances and goals as of 09:42, 24 May 2026 (UTC)

Pepijn Doesburg (born 17 January 2001) is a Dutch professional footballer who last played as a forward for Slovak club Trenčín. He is the grandson of Eredivisie record appearance holder Pim Doesburg.

== Club career ==
Doesburg played in the youth teams of TOGB and Feyenoord before joining Sparta Rotterdam. In June 2022 Doesburg began training with Dordrecht ahead of the 2022–23 season. He made his Eerste Divisie debut in August 2022 against Roda JC. He scored his first Eerste divisie goal against PEC Zwolle in October 2022.

On 31 August 2023, Doesburg was loaned by VVV-Venlo, with an option to buy. On 5 April 2024, he signed a permanent deal with the club; a two-year contract.

On 20 January 2025, Doesburg signed a one-and-a-half-year contract with Trenčín in Slovakia. He scored on his debut for Trenčín in a 1–0 win over Komárno.

== Personal life ==
His grandfather is former Dutch international footballer Pim Doesburg, who holds the record for Eredivisie appearances of 687. Unlike his grandfather though Pepijn explained he could not be a goalkeeper as he was useless with his hands. He credited his grandfather with passing on advice around the mental toughness required to play professionally which helped Pepijn with the mentality required to help overcome injuries in his career.
