= John Lammers (footballer) =

Dutch football manager (born 1963)

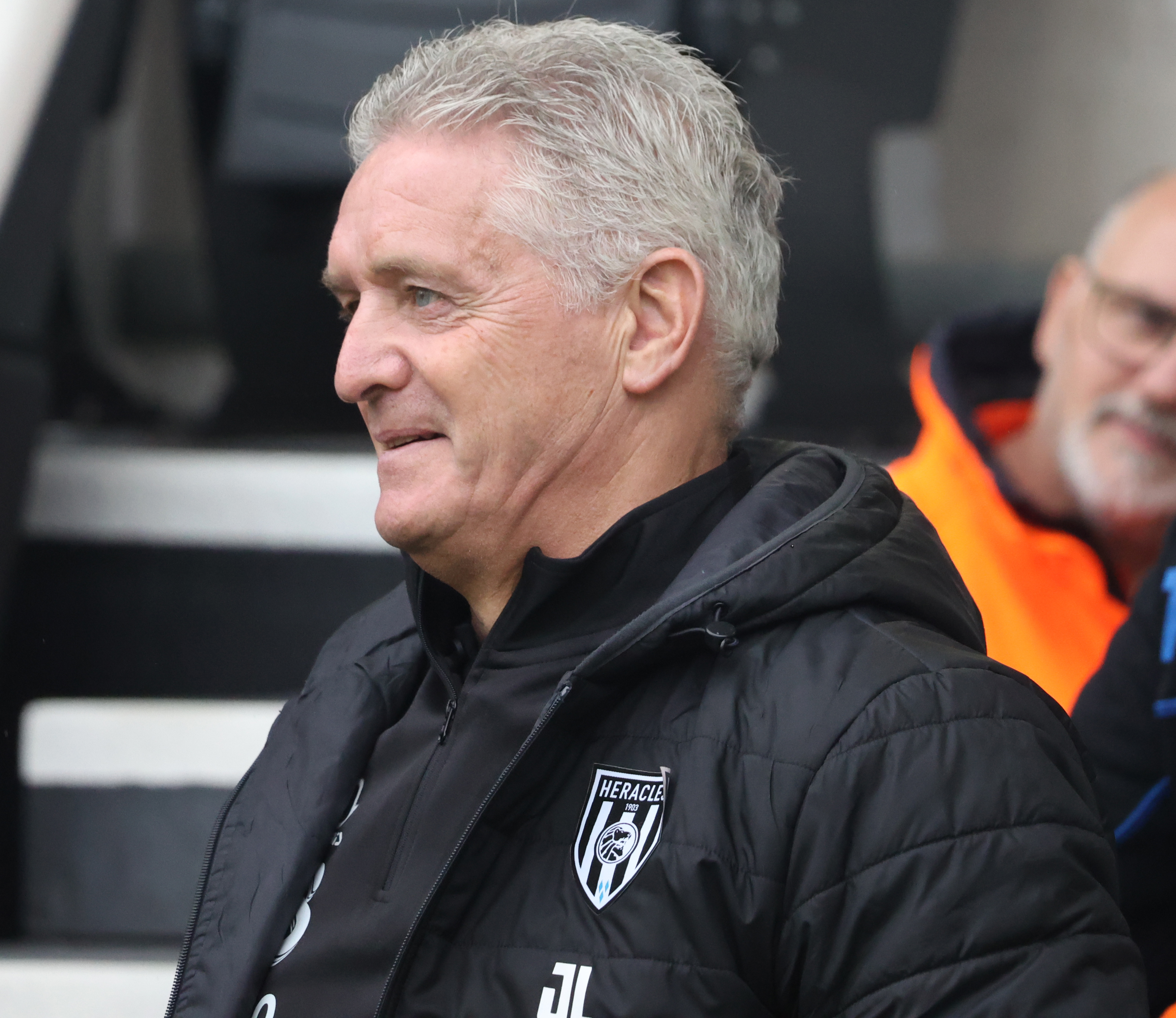
- Lammers as Heracles Almelo manager in 2023

Personal information
- Date of birth: 11 December 1963 (age 62)
- Place of birth: Tilburg, Netherlands
- Height: 1.78 m (5 ft 10 in)
- Position: Striker

Team information
- Current team: İstanbul Başakşehir (assistant coach)

Senior career*
Years	Team	Apps	(Gls)
1982–1984	Willem II	18	(0)
1984–1987	RKC	80	(42)
1987–1988	VVV	50	(17)
1988–1990	Toulon	31	(6)
1990–1995	NAC	165	(92)
1995–1996	Willem II	26	(9)
1996–1998	RKC	34	(3)
1998–2000	RBC	41	(19)
2000	Auckland Kingz	8	(0)
Total		433	(185)

Managerial career
- 2004: Achilles Veen
- 2011–2012: Excelsior
- 2012: Eindhoven
- 2014–2017: Vitesse (assistant)
- 2017–2019: Esbjerg fB
- 2022–2023: Heracles Almelo
- 2024–2025: VVV-Venlo
- 2025–: İstanbul Başakşehir (assistant)
- * Club domestic league appearances and goals

Johannes Gerardus Adrianus "John" Lammers (Dutch pronunciation: [dʑɔn ˈlɑmərs]; born 11 December 1963) is a Dutch professional football manager and former player who is an assistant coach with Turkish Süper Lig club İstanbul Başakşehir.

== Playing career ==
Lammers started his professional career in the 1982–83 season. He played as a forward for Willem II Tilburg, RKC Waalwijk, VVV-Venlo, Toulon, NAC Breda, RBC Roosendaal and New Zealand club Auckland Kingz.

== Coaching career ==
After his active career he started to work as an assistant coach, and also served as striker coach at Feyenoord Rotterdam's youth complex. He was subsequently signed by SBV Excelsior as Alex Pastoor's aide at the small Rotterdam-based club. In June 2011, after the departure of Pastoor to NEC, he was promoted as head coach for the new season. After one year to serve as head coach, he left Excelsior in charge of Eerste Divisie club FC Eindhoven. He signed a two-year contract with the club.

In June 2017 he was named new head coach of Danish Superliga club Esbjerg fB. He was dismissed in September 2019.

On 25 June 2022, Heracles Almelo appointed Lammers as head coach on a two-year deal with an option for another year, after the club had suffered relegation to the second-tier Eerste Divisie. In his first season in charge, Lammers gained the club promotion back to the top division.

On 26 March 2024, Lammers was announced as VVV-Venlo's new head coach ahead of the 2024–25 season, replacing the outgoing Rick Kruys who had decided to seek new challenges. Lammers signed a two-year contract. He left VVV-Venlo on 11 September 2025.

Two days later, Lammers was hired by İstanbul Başakşehir in Turkey as an assistant to Nuri Şahin.
