= Michalis Kosidis =

Greek footballer (born 2002)

Personal information
- Date of birth: 9 February 2002 (age 24)
- Place of birth: Thessaloniki, Greece
- Height: 1.91 m (6 ft 3 in)
- Position: Forward

Team information
- Current team: Zagłębie Lubin
- Number: 9

Youth career
- 2014–2017: Iraklis
- 2017–2021: AEK Athens

Senior career*
Years	Team	Apps	(Gls)
2021–2025	AEK Athens	10	(0)
2021–2024	AEK Athens B	31	(8)
2023–2024	→ VVV-Venlo (loan)	34	(9)
2024–2025	→ Puszcza Niepołomice (loan)	30	(8)
2025–	Zagłębie Lubin	39	(7)

International career
2022–2024	Greece U21	10	(2)
- * Club domestic league appearances and goals as of 12:36, 13 September 2026 (UTC)

Michalis Kosidis (Greek: Μιχάλης Κοσίδης; born 9 February 2002) is a Greek professional footballer who plays as a forward for Ekstraklasa club Zagłębie Lubin.

== Career ==
Kosidis comes from the youth ranks of AEK Athens.

On 23 July 2024, he joined Ekstraklasa club Puszcza Niepołomice on a season-long loan.

Kosidis remained in the Polish top division for the 2025–26 season; on 5 July 2025, he moved to Zagłębie Lubin on a two-year contract, with an optional third year.

== Personal life ==
Kosidis hails from Triada, Serres. His younger brothers Christos and Giorgos are also footballers.

== Career statistics ==
As of match played 23 May 2026

Appearances and goals by club, season and competition
Club	Season	League			National cup (Note: Includes Greek Cup, KNVB Cup, Polish Cup)		Continental		Other		Total	
Club	Season	Division	Apps	Goals	Apps	Goals	Apps	Goals	Apps	Goals	Apps	Goals
AEK Athens	2020–21	Super League Greece	6	0	1	0	—		—		7	0
AEK Athens	2021–22	Super League Greece	2	0	1	0	0	0	—		3	0
AEK Athens	2022–23	Super League Greece	2	0	3	1	—		—		5	1
AEK Athens	Total		10	0	5	1	0	0	—		15	1
AEK Athens B	2021–22	Super League Greece 2	22	4	—		—		—		22	4
AEK Athens B	2022–23	Super League Greece 2	9	4	—		—		—		9	4
AEK Athens B	Total		31	8	—		—		—		31	8
VVV-Venlo (loan)	2023–24	Eerste Divisie	34	9	1	0	—		—		35	9
Puszcza Niepołomice (loan)	2024–25	Ekstraklasa	30	8	4	1	—		—		34	9
Zagłębie Lubin	2025–26	Ekstraklasa	34	6	2	0	—		—		36	6
Career total			139	31	12	2	0	0	0	0	151	33

== Honours ==
AEK Athens

- Super League Greece: 2022–23
- Greek Cup: 2022–23
