= 2022–23 VVV-Venlo season =

VVV-Venlo
2022–23 season
- Chairman: Hai Berden
- Manager: Rick Kruys
- Stadium: De Koel
- Eerste Divisie: 7th
- KNVB Cup: 2nd round
- Top goalscorer: League: Sven Braken (13 goals); All: Sven Braken (16 goals)
- Biggest win: 4-0 FC Den Bosch (h) 28th week
- Biggest defeat: 4-0 PEC Zwolle (h) 3rd week
- All statistics correct as of 4 September 2026.

The 2022–23 season marked the 120th season of VVV-Venlo since the club's foundation. It was their 39th season in the Eerste Divisie and their second consecutive campaign in the second level of Dutch football.

VVV-Venlo also entered the KNVB Cup, alongside their league commitments. Their participation in the competition ended in the second round.

At the end of the regular season, VVV-Venlo qualified for the promotion play-offs. After progressing through the first round, they faced Almere City FC in the semi-finals. The tie was eventually decided by a penalty shoot-out, with Almere City winning 2–0 on penalties.

Sven Braken ended the campaign as VVV-Venlo's top goalscorer with 16 goals in all competitions. He scored 13 goals in the Eerste Divisie, two during the promotion play-offs and one in the KNVB Cup.

Rick Ketting made more appearances than any other VVV-Venlo player during the season, featuring in 43 matches across all competitions. He played 37 times in the Eerste Divisie, four times in the promotion play-offs and twice in the KNVB Cup.

The season covers the period from 5 August 2022 to 11 June 2023.

== Players ==
As of 31 January 2023

Note: Flags indicate national team as defined under FIFA eligibility rules; some limited exceptions apply. Players may hold more than one non-FIFA nationality.

No.	Pos.	Nation	Player
1	GK	NED	Ennio van der Gouw
2	DF	GER	Brian Koglin (captain)
3	DF	NED	Sem Dirks
4	DF	NED	Rick Ketting
5	DF	NED	Simon Janssen
6	MF	NED	Mitchell van Rooijen
7	MF	SWE	Carl Johansson
8	MF	NED	Kees de Boer
9	FW	NED	Sven Braken
10	FW	NED	Nick Venema
11	MF	NED	Thijme Verheijen
12	MF	NED	Joep Kluskens
13	MF	CZE	Richard Sedláček

No.	Pos.	Nation	Player
14	MF	NED	Levi Smans
17	DF	NED	Tristan Dekker
18	MF	NED	Robert Klaasen
18	DF	NED	Robin Lathouwers
19	FW	NED	Yahcuroo Roemer
20	DF	NED	Jens Jacobs
21	FW	ISL	Kristófer Kristinsson
23	MF	NED	Daan Huisman
27	FW	NED	Martijn Berden
29	FW	TUR	Özcan Yaşar
34	FW	NED	Soulyman Allouch
38	GK	CZE	Lukáš Zima

== Transfers ==
=== In ===
Pos.	Player	Transferred from	Fee	Date
GK	(Netherlands) Ennio van der Gouw	(Netherlands) FC Twente	Free	1 July 2022
MF	(Netherlands) Robert Klaasen	(Netherlands) Roda JC Kerkrade	Free	1 July 2022
FW	(Turkey) Özcan Yaşar	(Netherlands) NAC Breda U21	Free	16 July 2022
DF	(Netherlands) Rick Ketting	(Finland) FC Inter Turku		20 July 2022
MF	(Netherlands) Daan Huisman	(Netherlands) SBV Vitesse	On loan	31 August 2022
MF	(Iceland) Kristófer Kristinsson	No club		5 September 2022
DF	(Netherlands) Robin Lathouwers	(Netherlands) Jong AZ		9 January 2023
FW	(Netherlands) Soulyman Allouch	(Netherlands) Jong AZ		26 January 2023
FW	(Netherlands) Martijn Berden	(Netherlands) Go Ahead Eagles	On loan	31 January 2023

=== Out ===
Pos.	Player	Transferred to	Fee	Date
MF	(Netherlands) Rayan El Azrak	(Netherlands) Jong FC Utrecht	End of loan	30 June 2022
GK	(Netherlands) Delano van Crooij	No club		1 July 2022
MF	(Netherlands) Joep Munsters	(Germany) SV 19 Straelen	Free	1 July 2022
FW	(Netherlands) Joeri Schroyen	(Netherlands) Willem II Tilburg		1 July 2022
FW	(Germany) Tobias Pachonik	No club		1 July 2022
MF	(Morocco) Wassim Essanoussi	(Netherlands) Helmond Sport	Free	1 July 2022
DF	(Suriname) Yannick Leliendal	(Netherlands) Jong FC Utrecht	Free	1 July 2022
MF	(Netherlands) Niek Munsters	(Germany) SV 19 Straelen	Free	12 July 2022
DF	(Netherlands) Stan van Dijck	(Germany) 1. FC Phönix Lübeck	Free	20 July 2022
DF	(Netherlands) Ian Hussein Ngobi	No club		9 September 2022

== Pre-season and friendlies ==
Win Draw Loss Fixtures

5 July 2022 Friendly	Wittenhorst (Netherlands)	0–7	(Netherlands) VVV-Venlo	Horst, The Netherlands
19:00				Stadium: Sportpark Ter Horst

9 July 2022 Friendly	VVV-Venlo (Netherlands)	0–3	(Germany) Borussia Mönchengladbach II	Swolgen, The Netherlands
15:00				Stadium: Sportpark Sporting Swolgen Tienray

15 July 2022 Friendly	SV 19 Straelen (Germany)	0–1	(Netherlands) VVV-Venlo	Straelen am Niederrhein, Germany
19:00 CEST (UTC+2)				Stadium: Sportzentrum an der Römerstraße

19 July 2022 Friendly	VVV-Venlo (Netherlands)	2–3	(Netherlands) Jong AZ	Horst, The Netherlands
19:45				Stadium: Sportpark Ter Horst

22 July 2022 Friendly	VVV-Venlo (Netherlands)	2–2	(Netherlands) Vitesse	Horst, The Netherlands
15:00	Venema 55'; De Boer 76'		Frederiksen 16'; Wittek 74'	Stadium: Sportpark Ter Horst

26 July 2022 Friendly	VVV-Venlo (Netherlands)	1–2	(Greece) Atromitos F.C.	Venlo, The Netherlands
19:00				Stadium: De Koel

=== Overview ===
Competition	First match	Last match	Starting round	Final position	Record							
Competition	First match	Last match	Starting round	Final position	Pld	W	D	L	GF	GA	GD	Win %
Eerste Divisie	5 August 2022	19 May 2023	Week 1	7th	38	16	10	12	56	51	+5	42.11
Eredivisie Promotie	23 May 2023	3 June 2023	1st round	Semi-finals	4	1	3	0	7	6	+1	25.00
KNVB Cup	20 October 2023	11 January 2023	1st round	2nd round	2	1	0	1	4	4	+0	50.00
Total					44	18	13	13	67	61	+6	40.91

Last updated: 4 September 2026
Source: ESPN

=== Eerste Divisie ===
==== League table ====
Pos	Team	Pld	W	D	L	GF	GA	GD	Pts	Promotion or qualification
5	MVV Maastricht	38	18	5	15	65	65	0	59	Qualification for promotion play-offs
6	NAC Breda	38	18	5	15	64	64	0	59	Qualification for promotion play-offs
7	VVV-Venlo	38	16	10	12	56	51	+5	58	Qualification for promotion play-offs
8	Eindhoven	38	16	10	12	58	54	+4	58	Qualification for promotion play-offs
9	Telstar	38	14	11	13	39	52	−13	53	

Source: Soccerway, Keuken Kampioen Divisie (in Dutch)
Rules for classification: Season in progress: 1) Most points won; 2) Less points lost; 3) Goal difference; 4) Goals scored; 5) Alphabetical order; End of season: 1) Points; 2) Goal difference; 3) Goals scored; 4) Head-to-head points; 5) Head-to-head goal difference; 6) Head-to-head away goals scored; 7) Play-off if relevant for deciding champion, relegation or participating in a European league, otherwise by draw. 8) Penalty shoot-out (only after a play-off)

==== Results summary ====
Overall								Home						Away					
Pld	W	D	L	GF	GA	GD	Pts	W	D	L	GF	GA	GD	W	D	L	GF	GA	GD
38	16	10	12	56	51	+5	58	6	7	6	24	22	+2	10	3	6	32	29	+3

Source: Keuken Kampioen Divisie

==== Results by round ====
Round	1	2	3	4	5	6	7	8	9	10	11	12	13	14	15	16	17	18	19	20	21	22	23	24	25	26	27	28	29	30	31	32	33	34	35	36	37	38
Ground	H	A	H	A	H	A	H	H	A	A	H	A	H	A	H	A	H	A	H	A	A	H	A	H	A	H	A	H	A	H	H	A	H	A	H	A	H	A
Result	W	W	L	W	W	L	D	D	W	L	L	D	L	W	D	W	W	W	D	D	W	D	L	W	W	L	W	W	W	D	L	L	D	L	L	D	W	D
Position																																						7

Updated to match(es) played on 19 May 2023. Source: Keuken Kampioen Divisie Stand 2022-23
A = Away; H = Home; W = Win; D = Draw; L = Loss

=== Matches ===
The league fixtures were announced on 17 June 2022.

==== 1st half ====
5 August 2022 1st week	VVV-Venlo	3–0	Almere City FC	Venlo
20:00	Kees de Boer 7'; Sven Braken 32' (pen.); Damian van Bruggen 70' (o.g.)	Report		Stadium: De Koel; Attendance: 4,155; Referee: Laurens Gerrets

12 August 2022 2nd week	De Graafschap	1–2	VVV-Venlo	Doetinchem
20:00	Camiel Neghli 18'	Report	Thijme Verheijen 41'; Sven Braken 55' (pen.)	Stadium: De Vijverberg; Attendance: 9,543; Referee: Edwin van de Graaf

21 August 2022 3rd week	VVV-Venlo	0–4	PEC Zwolle	Venlo
12:15		Report	Bram van Polen 24' (pen.); Luis Görlich 45+4' 52'; Gabi Caschili 80'	Stadium: De Koel; Attendance: 5,054; Referee: Robin Hensgens

26 August 2022 4th week	TOP Oss	1–2	VVV-Venlo	Oss
20:00	Justin Mathieu 21' (pen.)	Report	Thijme Verheijen 41'; Nick Venema 90+3'	Stadium: Frans Heesen Stadion; Attendance: 1,668; Referee: Luuk Timmer

2 September 2022 5th week	VVV-Venlo	2–1	Jong FC Utrecht	Venlo
20:00	Sven Braken 24'; Brian Koglin 90+3'	Report	Christopher Mamengi 52'	Stadium: De Koel; Attendance: 3,786; Referee: Michael Eijgelsheim

9 September 2022 6th week	Heracles Almelo	5–3	VVV-Venlo	Almelo
20:00	Anas Ouahim 25' 55'; Nikolai Laursen 28'; Lucas Schoofs 61'; Sylian Mokono 81'	Report	Daan Huisman 41'; Nick Venema 47'; Kees de Boer 68'	Stadium: Asito Stadion; Attendance: 10,184; Referee: Marc Nagtegaal

16 September 2022 7th week	VVV-Venlo	1–1	Jong PSV	Venlo
20:00	Sven Braken 5'	Report	Simon Colyn 85'	Stadium: De Koel; Attendance: 5,613; Referee: Jesse Rozendal

23 September 2022 8th week	VVV-Venlo	1–1	SC Telstar	Venlo
21:00	Sven Braken 90+7'	Report	Mihkel Ainsalu 87'	Stadium: De Koel; Attendance: 4,658; Referee: Nick Smit

30 September 2022 9th week	NAC Breda	1–2	VVV-Venlo	Breda
20:00	Boyd Lucassen 69'	Report	Daan Huisman 52'; Nick Venema 47'; Carl Johansson 78'	Stadium: Rat Verlegh Stadion; Attendance: 18,297; Referee: Jochem Kamphuis

7 October 2022 10th week	Roda JC Kerkrade	4–1	VVV-Venlo	Kerkrade
20:00	Romano Postema 11'; Dylan Vente 64' 71' (pen.); Bryan Limbombe 75'	Report	Sven Braken 7'	Stadium: Parkstad Limburg Stadion; Attendance: 9,132; Referee: Marc Nagtegaal

14 October 2022 11th week	VVV-Venlo	0–1	FC Dordrecht	Venlo
20:00		Report	Aliou Baldé 39'	Stadium: De Koel; Attendance: 4,330; Referee: Erwin Blank

24 October 2022 12th week	Jong Ajax	1–1	VVV-Venlo	Ouder-Amstel
20:00	Christian Rasmussen 31'	Report	Sven Braken 29'	Stadium: Sportpark De Toekomst; Attendance: 1,030; Referee: Luuk Timmer

28 October 2022 13th week	VVV-Venlo	1–2	Jong AZ	Venlo
20:00	Sven Braken 37'	Report	Iman Griffith 25'; Yusuf Barası 64'	Stadium: De Koel; Attendance: 7,346; Referee: Robin Vereijken

4 November 2022 14th week	ADO Den Haag	2–3	VVV-Venlo	The Hague
20:00	Silvinho Esajas 5'; Xander Severina 75'	Report	Rick Ketting 45+1'; Tristan Dekker 66'; Nick Venema 90+6'	Stadium: Cars Jeans Stadion; Attendance: 2,433; Referee: Clay Ruperti

11 November 2022 15th week	VVV-Venlo	0–0	Willem II Tilburg	Venlo
20:00		Report		Stadium: De Koel; Attendance: 5,822; Referee: Rob Dieperink

19 November 2022 16th week	FC Den Bosch	0–2	VVV-Venlo	's-Hertogenbosch
16:30		Report	Daan Huisman 3'; Sven Braken 81'	Stadium: De Vliert; Attendance: 4,300; Referee: Richard Martens

11 December 2022 17th week	VVV-Venlo	2–1	MVV Maastricht	Venlo
14:30	Robert Klaasen 73'; Nick Venema 86'	Report	Ruben van Bommel 56'	Stadium: De Koel; Attendance: 6,191; Referee: Erwin Blank

16 December 2022 18th week	FC Eindhoven	0–2	VVV-Venlo	Eindhoven
20:00		Report	Mitchell van Rooijen 74'; Jasper Dahlhaus 82' (o.g.)	Stadium: Jan Louwers Stadion; Attendance: 2,992; Referee: Ingmar Oostrom

==== 2nd half ====
6 January 2023 19th week	VVV-Venlo	1–1	Helmond Sport	Venlo
20:00	Nick Venema 31'	Report	Bram van Vlerken 69'	Stadium: De Koel; Attendance: 5,371; Referee: Robin Vereijken

20 January 2023 20th week	PEC Zwolle	2–0	VVV-Venlo	Zwolle
20:00	Davy van den Berg 74'; Lennart Thy 79'	Report		Stadium: MAC3PARK Stadion; Attendance: 13,322; Referee: Marc Nagtegaal

23 January 2023 21st week	Jong PSV	1–2	VVV-Venlo	Eindhoven
20:00	Jason van Duiven 10'	Report	Robin Lathouwers 61'; Nick Venema 90'	Stadium: Jan Louwers Stadion; Attendance: 658; Referee: Martijn Vos

27 January 2023 22nd week	VVV-Venlo	0–0	ADO Den Haag	Venlo
20:00		Report		Stadium: De Koel; Attendance: 4,881; Referee: Jochem Kamphuis

3 February 2023 23rd week	Jong AZ	4–3	VVV-Venlo	The Hague
20:00	Mexx Meerdink 5' 50'; Lewis Schouten 23'; Ro-Zangelo Daal 90+4'	Report	Nick Venema 33' 83'; Rick Ketting 90+8'	Stadium: AFAS Trainingscomplex; Attendance: 450; Referee: Clay Ruperti

10 February 2023 24th week	VVV-Venlo	3–1	Heracles Almelo	Venlo
20:00	Nick Venema 61'; Kees de Boer 75'; Mitchell van Rooijen 82'	Report	Lucas Schoofs 18'	Stadium: De Koel; Attendance: 5,317; Referee: Martin van den Kerkhof

17 February 2023 25th week	FC Dordrecht	1–2	VVV-Venlo	Dordrecht
20:00	Sam Long 90+2'	Report	Tristan Dekker 83'; Simon Janssen 90+3'	Stadium: Stadion Krommedijk; Attendance: 1,691; Referee: Kevin Puts

24 February 2023 26th week	VVV-Venlo	0–1	TOP Oss	Venlo
20:00		Report	Roshon van Eijma 77'	Stadium: De Koel; Attendance: 4,696; Referee: Luuk Timmer

3 March 2023 27th week	MVV Maastricht	0–1	VVV-Venlo	Maastricht
20:00		Report	Martijn Berden 14'	Stadium: De Geusselt; Attendance: 6,456; Referee: Erwin Blank

10 March 2023 28th week	VVV-Venlo	4–0	FC Den Bosch	Venlo
20:00	Robert Klaasen 32'; Kees de Boer 45+1'; Nick Venema 58'; Sven Braken 70'	Report		Stadium: De Koel; Attendance: 4,524; Referee: Alex Bos

13 March 2023 29th week	Almere City FC	1–3	VVV-Venlo	Almere
20:00	Jochem Ritmeester van de Kamp 18'	Report	Nick Venema 49'; Kees de Boer 54'; Martijn Berden 61'	Stadium: Yanmar Stadion; Attendance: 1,902; Referee: Bas Nijhuis

19 March 2023 30th week	VVV-Venlo	1–1	Roda JC Kerkrade	Venlo
12:15	Rick Ketting 57'	Report	Dylan Vente 50'	Stadium: De Koel; Attendance: 6,453; Referee: Marc Nagtegaal

31 March 2023 31st week	VVV-Venlo	1–3	NAC Breda	Venlo
20:00	Kees de Boer 49'	Report	Aime Omgba 16'; Elías Már Ómarsson 57'; Simon Janssen 62' (o.g.)	Stadium: De Koel; Referee: Jannick van der Laan

9 April 2023 32nd week	Willem II Tilburg	2–1	VVV-Venlo	Tilburg
12:15	Jizz Hornkamp 31' 51'	Report	Sven Braken 21'	Stadium: Koning Willem II Stadion; Attendance: 13,525; Referee: Allard Lindhout

14 April 2023 33rd week	VVV-Venlo	2–2	FC Eindhoven	Venlo
20:00	Soulyman Allouch 50'; Nick Venema 84'	Report	Mawouna Amevor 28'; Ozan Kökçü 68'	Stadium: De Koel; Attendance: 5,864; Referee: Rob Dieperink

21 April 2023 34th week	SC Telstar	1–0	VVV-Venlo	Velsen-Zuid
20:00	David Min 53'	Report		Stadium: BUKO Stadion; Attendance: 2,377; Referee: Clay Ruperti

28 April 2023 35th week	VVV-Venlo	0–1	Jong Ajax	Venlo
20:00		Report	Kristian Hlynsson 83' (pen.)	Stadium: De Koel; Attendance: 6,356; Referee: Jesse Rozendal

5 May 2023 36th week	Helmond Sport	1–1	VVV-Venlo	Helmond
20:00	Jafar Arias 75'	Report	Sven Braken 68'	Stadium: Stadion De Braak; Attendance: 1,954; Referee: Martijn Vos

12 May 2023 37th week	VVV-Venlo	2–1	De Graafschap	Venlo
20:00	Robin Lathouwers 49'; Daan Huisman 90+3'	Report	Devin Haen 50'	Stadium: De Koel; Attendance: 6,180; Referee: Alex Bos

19 May 2023 38th week	Jong FC Utrecht	1–1	VVV-Venlo	Utrecht
20:00	Lynden Edhart 89'	Report	Sven Braken 33' (pen.)	Stadium: Sportcomplex Zoudenbalch; Attendance: 525; Referee: Kevin Puts

==== Promotion play-offs ====
23 May 2023 First round First leg	VVV-Venlo	3–2	Willem II	Venlo
18:45	Braken 41', 45+3' (pen.); Venema 65'	Report	Hornkamp 13', 36'	Stadium: De Koel; Attendance: 5,392; Referee: Rob Dieperink

27 May 2023 First round First leg	Willem II	2–2 (a.e.t.) (5–4 agg.)	VVV-Venlo	Tilburg
16:30	Kabangu 7'; Bosch 22'	Report	Venema 74'; Yasar 120+1'	Stadium: Koning Willem II Stadion; Attendance: 13,326; Referee: Ingmar Oostrom

30 May 2023 Semifinals; First leg	VVV-Venlo	1–1	Almere City	Venlo
20:00 CEST (UTC+2)	Van Rooijen 7'	Report	Limbombe 29'	Stadium: De Koel; Attendance: 7,201; Referee: Martin van den Kerkhof

3 June 2023 Semifinals; Second leg	Almere City	1–1 (a.e.t.) (2–2 agg.) (2–0 p)	VVV-Venlo	Almere
16:30 CEST (UTC+2)	Duijvestijn 50'	Report	Allouch 62'	Stadium: Yanmar Stadion; Attendance: 4,019; Referee: Edwin van de Graaf
	Penalties
	Van La Parra (penalty missed); Alhaft (penalty missed); Duijvestijn (penalty scored); Peña (penalty scored)		(penalty missed) Venema; (penalty missed) Allouch; (penalty missed) Koglin; (penalty missed) De Boer

=== KNVB Cup ===
20 October 2022 1st round	VV Dongen	1–2	VVV-Venlo	Dongen
20:00	Thom Avontuur 12'	Report	Thijme Verheijen 74'; Sven Braken 90'	Stadium: De Biezen; Attendance: 2,000; Referee: Jannick van der Laan

11 January 2023 2nd round	VVV-Venlo	2–3	FC Emmen	Venlo
20:00	Daan Huisman 58'; Nick Venema 75'	Report	Jari Vlak 31'; Mark Diemers 34'; Miguel Araujo 90+4'	Stadium: De Koel; Attendance: 3,421; Referee: Martin Fernando Perezlindo

== Statistics ==
=== Scorers ===
#	Player	Eerste Divisie	Play-offs	KNVB	Total
1	(Netherlands) Sven Braken	13	2	1	16
2	(Netherlands) Nick Venema	12	2	1	15
3	(Netherlands) Kees de Boer	6	0	0	6
4	(Netherlands) Daan Huisman	4	0	1	5
5	(Netherlands) Rick Ketting	3	0	0	3
5	(Netherlands) Mitchell van Rooijen	2	1	0	3
5	(Netherlands) Robin Lathouwers	2	0	1	3
5	(Netherlands) Thijme Verheijen	2	0	1	3
9	(Netherlands) Martijn Berden	2	0	0	2
9	(Netherlands) Robert Klaasen	2	0	0	2
9	(Netherlands) Tristan Dekker	2	0	0	2
9	(Netherlands) Soulyman Allouch	1	1	0	2
13	(Germany) Brian Koglin	1	0	0	1
13	(Netherlands) Carl Johansson	1	0	0	1
13	(Netherlands) Simon Janssen	1	0	0	1
13	(Netherlands) Özcan Yaşar	0	1	0	1
13	(Netherlands) Daan Huisman	0	0	1	1

=== Appearances ===
#	Player	Eerste Divisie	Play-offs	KNVB	Total
1	(Netherlands) Rick Ketting	38	4	2	44
2	(Netherlands) Nick Venema	36	4	2	42
2	(Netherlands) Simon Janssen	36	4	2	42
4	(Netherlands) Kees de Boer	35	4	1	40
4	(Germany) Brian Koglin	34	4	2	40
6	(Netherlands) Robert Klaasen	33	4	1	38
6	(Netherlands) Mitchell van Rooijen	32	4	2	38
8	(Netherlands) Daan Huisman	32	4	1	37
8	(Netherlands) Ennio van der Gouw	32	4	1	37
8	(Netherlands) Sven Braken	32	4	1	37
11	(Czech Republic) Richard Sedláček	32	0	2	34
12	(Sweden) Carl Johansson	27	4	2	33
13	(Turkey) Özcan Yaşar	26	2	0	28
13	(Netherlands) Tristan Dekker	23	3	2	28
15	(Netherlands) Robin Lathouwers	17	3	1	21
16	(Netherlands) Soulyman Allouch	16	4	0	20
17	(Netherlands) Joep Kluskens	16	1	2	19
18	(Netherlands) Thijme Verheijen	17	0	1	18
18	(Netherlands) Sem Dirks	14	3	1	18
18	(Iceland) Kristófer Kristinsson	14	2	2	18
21	(Netherlands) Levi Smans	13	2	1	16
22	(Suriname) Yahcuroo Roemer	12	0	2	14
23	(Netherlands) Martijn Berden	12	0	0	12
24	(Czech Republic) Lukáš Zima	7	0	1	8
25	(Netherlands) Jens Jacobs	2	0	0	2

=== Clean sheets ===
#	Player	Eerste Divisie
1	(Netherlands) Ennio van der Gouw	6
2	(Czech Republic) Lukáš Zima	1
Total		7

=== Disciplinary record ===
#	Player	Eerste Divisie		Play-offs		KNVB		Total	
#	Player	Yellow card	Red card	Yellow card	Red card	Yellow card	Red card	Yellow card	Red card
1	(Netherlands) Kees de Boer	6	0	2	0	1	0	9	0
2	(Netherlands) Simon Janssen	7	0	0	0	1	0	8	0
3	(Netherlands) Mitchell van Rooijen	4	0	1	0	0	0	5	0
3	(Netherlands) Tristan Dekker	4	0	1	0	0	0	5	0
3	(Netherlands) Robert Klaasen	3	0	1	0	1	0	5	0
6	(Czech Republic) Richard Sedláček	4	0	0	0	1	0	4	0
7	(Netherlands) Rick Ketting	3	0	0	0	0	0	3	0
7	(Netherlands) Soulyman Allouch	2	0	1	0	0	0	3	0
7	(Netherlands) Sven Braken	2	0	1	0	0	0	3	0
7	(Sweden) Carl Johansson	1	0	1	0	1	0	3	0
11	(Netherlands) Ennio van der Gouw	2	0	0	0	0	0	2	0
11	(Netherlands) Joep Kluskens	2	0	0	0	0	0	2	0
11	(Netherlands) Martijn Berden	2	0	0	0	0	0	2	0
11	(Netherlands) Nick Venema	2	0	0	0	0	0	2	0
11	(Netherlands) Yahcuroo Roemer	2	0	0	0	0	0	2	0
11	(Turkey) Özcan Yaşar	1	0	1	0	0	0	2	0
17	(Germany) Brian Koglin	1	0	0	0	0	0	1	0
17	(Netherlands) Jens Jacobs	1	0	0	0	0	0	1	0
17	(Netherlands) Levi Smans	1	0	0	0	0	0	1	0
17	(Netherlands) Robin Lathouwers	1	0	0	0	0	0	1	0
17	(Netherlands) Sem Dirks	1	0	0	0	0	0	1	0
17	(Netherlands) Thijme Verheijen	1	0	0	0	0	0	1	0
