= 2013–14 MVV Maastricht season =

MVV Maastricht — 2013–14 Season
- Full name: Maatschappelijke Voetbal Vereniging Maastricht
- Nicknames: Us MVV'ke (our little MVV), De Sterrendragers ("Wearers of Stars")
- Founded: 2 April 1902
- Ground: De Geusselt, Maastricht
- Capacity: 10,500
- Chairman: Paul Rinkens
- Manager: Tini Tuijs
- League: Jupiler League
| Home colours | Away colours |

The 2013–14 season was the 14th year of continuous activity of the Maastricht association football club MVV Maastricht in the Jupiler League. MVV Maastricht regularly played its home games on Friday evenings at 8:00 PM.

== Technical staff and selection ==
=== Technical staff ===
| Name | Nationality | Function |
|---|---|---|
| Tini Ruijs | Netherlands | Head trainer / Technical director |
| Edwin Hermans | Netherlands | Assistant trainer |
| Dick Voorn | Netherlands | Assistant trainer |
| Marco Wijnen | Netherlands | Goalkeeper coach |
| Sef Hoenjet | Netherlands | Provider |
| Pie Castermans | Netherlands | Club Doctor |
| Bèr Huijnen | Netherlands | Club Doctor |
| Roger op het Veld | Netherlands | Osteopath |
| Erik Wintjens | Netherlands | Physiotherapist |
| Lei Bovens | Netherlands | Team Manager |
| John Sliepen | Netherlands | Team Manager |
| Perry Delvoux | Netherlands | Equipment Manager |
| Frank Huismans | Netherlands | Equipment Manager |

== Selection ==
| Name | Nationality | Position | No. | Played for MVV Maastricht since | Contract until | Previous club |
|---|---|---|---|---|---|---|
| Bram Castro | Belgium | Goalkeeper | 1 | 2012–13 | 2014 | Sint-Truidense VV |
| Yannick Derix | Netherlands | Goalkeeper | 24 | 2012–13 | 2013 | PSV'35 |
| Antonio Stankov | Macedonia | Defender | 18 | 2012–13 | Amateur | FC Oss |
| Cor Gillis | Belgium | Defender | 4 | 2012–13 | 2014 | FCV Dender EH |
| Kjell Knops | Netherlands | Defender | 15 | 2011–12 | 2013 | EVV |
| Nick Kuipers | Netherlands | Defender | 2 | 2010–11 | 2013 | MVV Maastricht Youth Club |
| Hawbir Moustafa | Netherlands | Defender | 12 | 2011–12 | 2015 | MVV Maastricht Youth Club |
| Sjors Verdellen | Netherlands | Defender | 3 | 2010–11 | 2014 | VVV-Venlo |
| Sjoerd Winkens | Netherlands | Defender | 5 | 2011–12 | 2014 | Helmond Sport |
| Tom van Hyfte | Belgium | Midfielder | 7 | 2009–10 | 2014 | KFC VW Hamme (Bel) |
| Nathan Rutjes | Netherlands | Midfielder | 6 | 2012–13 | 2014 | Sparta Rotterdam |
| Leroy Labylle | Belgium | Midfielder | 17 | 2011–12 | 2014 | Standard Luik |
| Bryan Smeets | Netherlands | Midfielder | 14 | 2009–10 | 2014 | MVV Maastricht Youth Club |
| Koen Daerden | Belgium | Midfielder | 16 | 2012–13 | Amateur | Standard Luik |
| Michael la Rosa | Belgium | Attacker | 19 | 2010–11 | 2014 | MVV Maastricht Youth Club |
| Sven Braken | Netherlands | Attacker | 25 | 2010–11 | 2014 | MVV Maastricht Youth Club |
| Mark Veldmate | Netherlands | Attacker | 9 | 2012–13 | 2015 | Sparta Rotterdam |
| Danny Schreurs | Netherlands | Attacker | 10 | 2012–13 | 2014 | Willem II, MVV Maastricht Youth Club |
| Gianluca Maria | Netherlands | Attacker | 8 | 2013–14 | ?? | PSV |
| Marco Ospitalieri | Belgium | Midfielder | 11 | 2013–14 | 2015 | PSV |
| Mitchell de Jong | Netherlands | Midfielder | 13 | 2013–14 | ?? | MVV Maastricht Youth Club |
| Cem Unal | Belgium | Attacker | 21 | 2013–14 | ?? | MVV Maastricht Youth Club |

=== Transfers ===
| Name | Nationality | Position | Transferred to |
|---|---|---|---|
| Yannick De Winter | Belgium | Goalkeeper | Unknown |
| Davide Timmermans | Belgium | Midfielder | Unknown |
| Lance Voorjans | Netherlands | Midfielder | KFC Uerdingen 05 |
| Lloyd Borgers | Netherlands | Attacker | Team VVCS |
| Malcolm Esajas | Netherlands | Attacker | ADO Den Haag |

== 2013–14 season matches ==
=== 2013–14 season practice matches ===
| Date | Home team | Away team | Final score | MVV Scorers |
|---|---|---|---|---|
| 2 July 2013 | RKVVL/Polaris | MVV Maastricht | 0-4 | Antonio Stankov, Njengo Mandeng Leopold, Sven Braken 2x |
| 10 July 2013 | MVV Maastricht | FC Porto | 0-6 | |
| 13 July 2013 | MVV Maastricht | KVC Westerlo | 3-2 | Cor Gillis, Gianluca Maria, Brian Smeets |
| 17 July 2013 | AZ | MVV Maastricht | 3-0 | |
| 20 July 2013 | MVV Maastricht | KAS Eupen | 0-1 | |
| 23 July 2013 | SV Meerssen | MVV Maastricht | 0-2 | Gianluca Maria 2x |
| 26 July 2013 | MVV Maastricht | STVV | 0-0 | |

=== 2013–14 season league matches ===
| Date | Home team | Away team | Final score | MVV Scorers | Comments |
|---|---|---|---|---|---|
| 2 August 2013 | FC Dordrecht | MVV Maastricht | 2-1 | Tom van Hyfte | |
| 10 August 2013 | MVV Maastricht | Jong FC Twente | 1-0 | Tom van Hyfte | Second match of Jong FC Twente in professional football |
| 16 August 2013 | MVV Maastricht | Jong Ajax | 1-0 | Brian Smeets | |
| 23 August 2013 | FC Eindhoven | MVV Maastricht | 3-2 | Brian Smeets 2x | MVV Maastricht came back twice in the match thanks to two unused penalties from Brian Smeets |

=== 2013–14 cup matches ===
| Date | Home team | Away team | Final score | MVV Scorers | Comments |
|---|---|---|---|---|---|
| 24 September 2013 | FC Lisse/TEC | MVV Maastricht | 1 - 3 | Gianluca Maria (2x) Sven Braken | |
| 29 October 2013 | MVV Maastricht | ADO Den Haag | 2 - 1 | Rick Geenen (2x) | |

== 2013–14 season competition results ==
MVV Maastricht lost the opening matches of the new season again FC Dordrecht. The team won its next match, against FC Tweede Jong.
