= Soulyman Allouch =

Dutch footballer (born 2002)

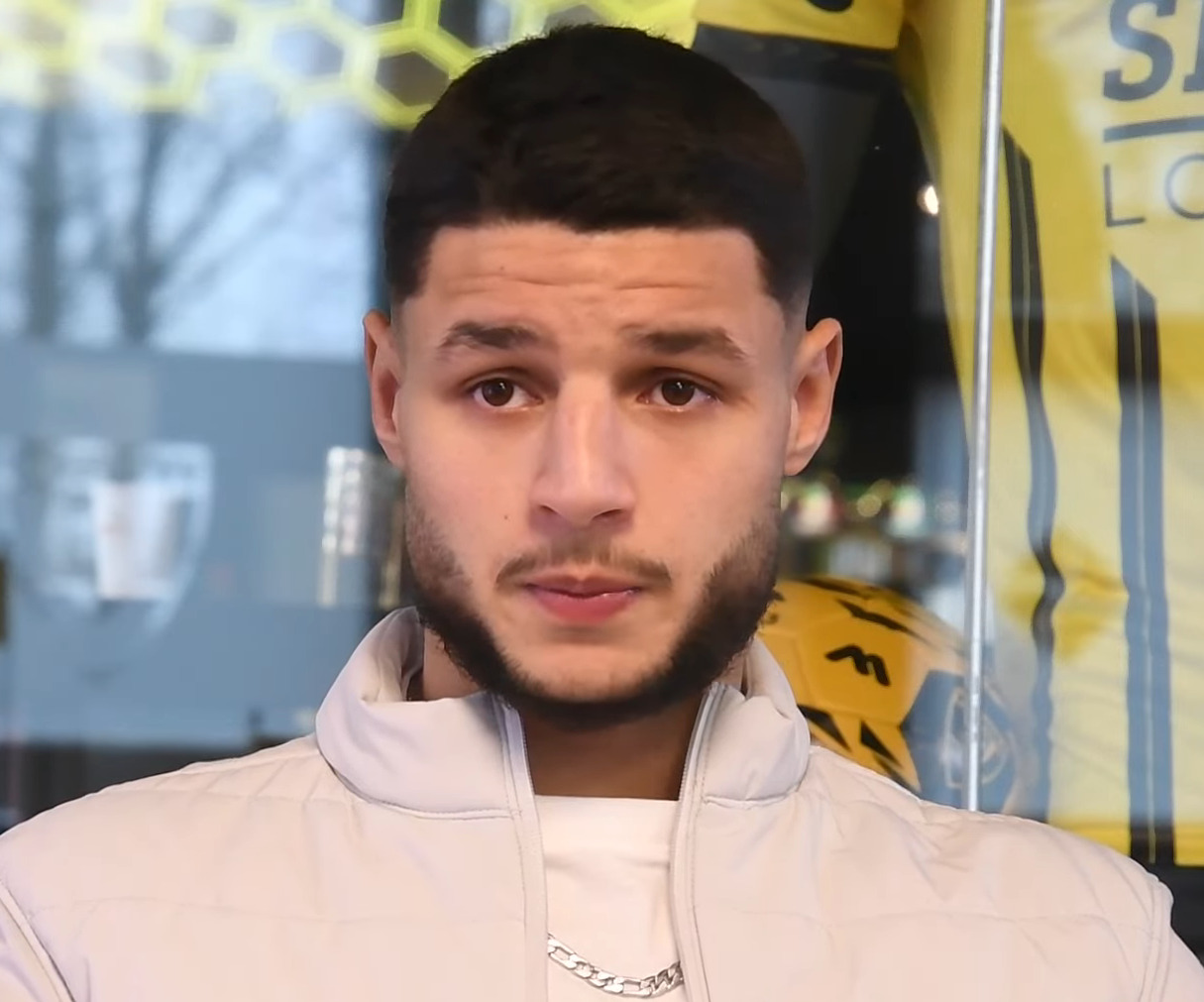
- Allouch in 2023

Personal information
- Full name: Soulaïman Allouch
- Date of birth: 26 January 2002 (age 24)
- Place of birth: Amsterdam, Netherlands
- Height: 1.74 m (5 ft 9 in)
- Position: Forward

Team information
- Current team: MAS Fès
- Number: 11

Youth career
- 2009–2015: RKSV Pancratius
- 2015–2016: AFC
- 2016–2017: Ajax
- 2017–2023: AZ

Senior career*
Years	Team	Apps	(Gls)
2019–2023	Jong AZ	58	(6)
2023–2024	VVV-Venlo	33	(4)
2024–2025	Sabail	47	(6)
2025–	MAS Fès	19	(3)

International career^{‡}
2018–2019	Netherlands U17	15	(1)
2019	Netherlands U18	3	(1)
Medal record
Representing Netherlands
UEFA European Under-17 Championship
Winner	Ireland 2019	U-17 Team
- * Club domestic league appearances and goals as of 02:46, 12 June 2026 (UTC) ‡ National team caps and goals as of 11:44, 11 December 2019 (UTC)

Soulyman Allouch (Arabic: سليمان علوش; Berber languages: ⵙⵓⵍⴰⵉⵎⴰⵏ ⵄⵍⵓⵛ; born 26 January 2002), also spelled Soulaïman, is a Dutch professional footballer who plays as a forward for Moroccan club MAS Fès.

== Club career ==
=== AZ ===
Allouch began his youth career at RKSV Pancratius before moving to AFC and eventually Ajax. However, in September 2017, he was released from Ajax following an incident. Later that year, he found a new home in the youth academy of AZ, where he developed into a youth international. In 2019, he signed a contract extension until 2022.

His professional debut in the Eerste Divisie for Jong AZ came on 13 September 2019, in an away match against Jong PSV, which ended in a 3–2 loss. Allouch entered the game in the 71st minute, replacing Félix Correia.

In 2021, an injury sidelined him for an extended period, but he made a triumphant return in November 2021. His impressive performance led to a contract extension until 2024, with an option for an additional year in March 2022. During the 2022–23 season, Allouch scored six goals and provided seven assists in his first 20 appearances. In October 2022, Allouch was honoured with the Bronze Shield for being named Best Talent of the first period of the Eerste Divisie, sparking interest from other clubs.

=== VVV-Venlo ===
In January 2023, Allouch moved to VVV-Venlo, reuniting with former teammates Sem Dirks, Richard Sedláček, and Robin Lathouwers. Allouch signed a contract with VVV until 2026 and made his debut for the club on 27 January 2023, coming on as a substitute for Kristófer Kristinsson in the 54th minute during a home match against ADO Den Haag, which ended in a 0–0 draw.

During the 2023–24 season, he encountered disciplinary challenges, resulting in his absence from three games due to lateness on matchdays. This included a significant 2–1 loss on 15 December 2023, against TOP Oss.

=== Sabail ===
On 1 February 2024, Allouch signed a two-and-a-half-year contract with Sabail in Azerbaijan.

== International career ==
Allouch is a Netherlands youth international. With the under-17s, he scored a goal against Sweden U17 in October 2018, during the qualifiers for the 2019 UEFA European Under-17 Championship. He then participated in the tournament, after the Netherlands secured qualification. He played five matches during the competition, where he played as a right winger. The Dutch won the tournament by beating Italy U17 in the final with a score of 4–2.

== Personal life ==
Born in the Netherlands, Allouch is of Moroccan descent.

== Career statistics ==
As of match played 17 February 2024

Appearances and goals by club, season and competition
Club	Season	League			National cup		Other		Total	
Club	Season	Division	Apps	Goals	Apps	Goals	Apps	Goals	Apps	Goals
Jong AZ	2019–20	Eerste Divisie	1	0	—		—		1	0
Jong AZ	2020–21	Eerste Divisie	19	0	—		—		19	0
Jong AZ	2021–22	Eerste Divisie	18	0	—		—		18	0
Jong AZ	2022–23	Eerste Divisie	20	6	—		—		20	6
Jong AZ	Total		58	6	—		—		58	6
VVV-Venlo	2022–23	Eerste Divisie	16	1	0	0	4 (Note: Appearances in Eredivisie promotion/relegation playoffs)	1	20	2
VVV-Venlo	2023–24	Eerste Divisie	17	3	1	1	—		18	4
VVV-Venlo	Total		33	4	1	1	4	1	38	6
Sabail	2023–24	Azerbaijan Premier League	3	2	—		—		3	2
Career total			94	12	1	1	4	1	99	14

== Honours ==
Netherlands U17

- UEFA European Under-17 Championship: 2019
