= Robin Lathouwers =

Dutch footballer (born 2000)

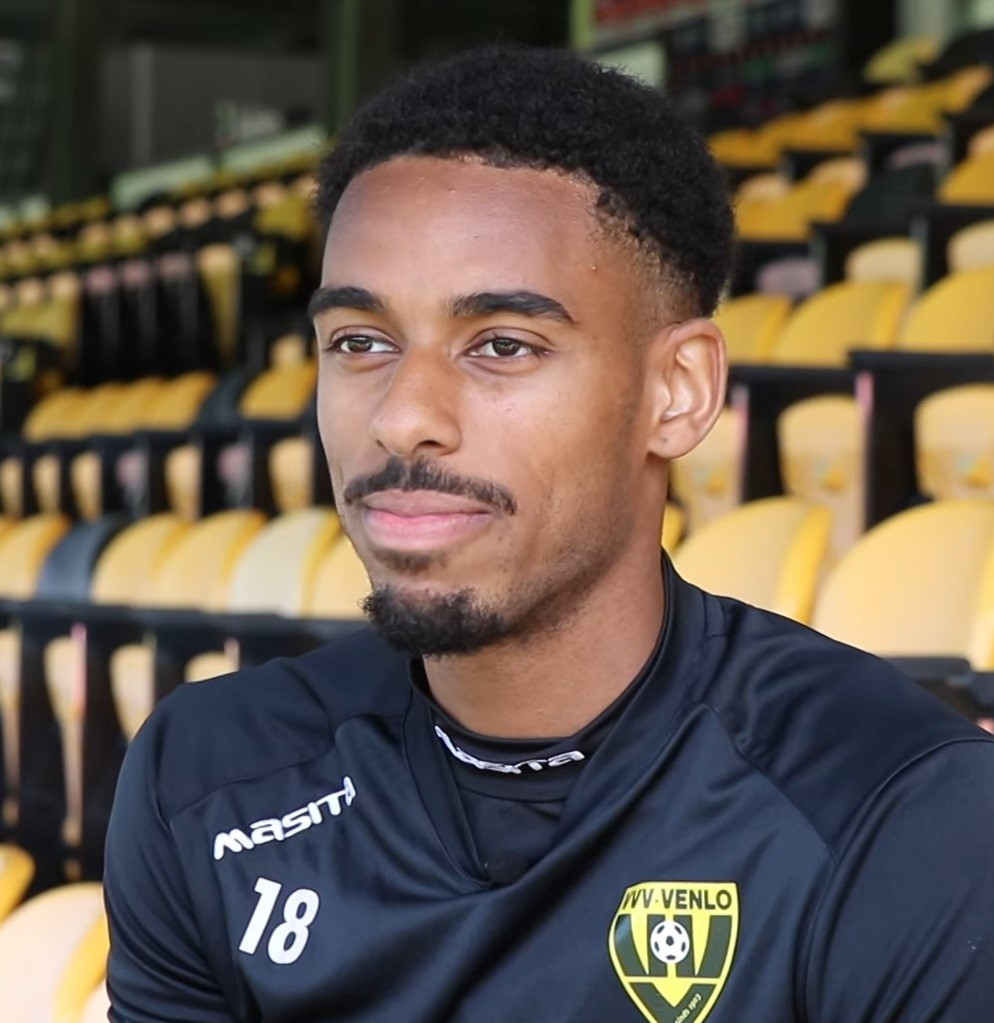
- Lathouwers in 2023

Personal information
- Date of birth: 9 March 2000 (age 26)
- Place of birth: Amsterdam, Netherlands
- Position: Right-back

Team information
- Current team: Koninklijke HFC
- Number: 5

Youth career
- –2011: SV Rap
- 2011–2019: AZ

Senior career*
| Years | Team | Apps | (Gls) |
| 2019–2023 | Jong AZ | 56 | (2) |
| 2023–2025 | VVV-Venlo | 41 | (3) |
| 2026– | Koninklijke HFC | 5 | (0) |

International career
| 2017 | Netherlands U17 | 2 | (0) |
- * Club domestic league appearances and goals as of 07:44, 16 October 2024 (UTC)

Robin Lathouwers (born 9 March 2000) is a Dutch professional footballer who plays as a right-back for Tweede Divisie club Koninklijke HFC.

== Club career ==
=== AZ ===
Lathouwers started playing football in the youth ranks of SV Rap and later AZ, where he in 2017 secured a contract until 2020. He made his professional debut on 22 December 2019 for the reserve team, Jong AZ, in a 3–1 away loss against Telstar in the Eerste Divisie. He replaced Anton Fase in the 70th minute. However, due to a long-term injury, this remained his sole appearance that season. Despite his contract expiring in 2020, Lathouwers opted to stay with AZ on amateur terms. During the 2020–21 season, he featured in 13 league matches, impressing the club management to earn a new contract until 2022 with an option for an additional year.

On 18 March 2022, Lathouwers scored his first professional goal, securing a crucial 1–0 away win against Jong Utrecht. His consistent performances made him a key player for Jong AZ, and he even made his unofficial debut for AZ's first team during the 2022–23 preseason, competing with Yukinari Sugawara and Pantelis Chatzidiakos for a spot.

=== VVV-Venlo ===
In January 2023, Lathouwers joined VVV-Venlo, reuniting with former teammates Sem Dirks and Richard Sedláček. Signing a contract until 2025 with an option for an additional year, he made his debut for VVV-Venlo on 11 January 2023, coming on as a substitute for Simon Janssen in the 76th minute during a 3–2 loss to Emmen in the KNVB Cup.

He remained with the club through the 2024–25 season. Upon the expiry of his contract, VVV-Venlo opted not to renew, and Lathouwers left the club as a free agent.

=== Koninklijke HFC ===
In January 2026, after six months as a free agent, Lathouwers signed a six-month contract with Koninklijke HFC, an amateur club in the third-tier Tweede Divisie.

== Career statistics ==
As of match played 9 May 2026

Appearances and goals by club, season and competition
| Club | Season | League | | | KNVB Cup | | Other | | Total | |
| Club | Season | Division | Apps | Goals | Apps | Goals | Apps | Goals | Apps | Goals |
|---|---|---|---|---|---|---|---|---|---|---|
| Jong AZ | 2019–20 | Eerste Divisie | 1 | 0 | — | | — | | 1 | 0 |
| Jong AZ | 2020–21 | Eerste Divisie | 13 | 0 | — | | — | | 13 | 0 |
| Jong AZ | 2021–22 | Eerste Divisie | 25 | 1 | — | | — | | 25 | 1 |
| Jong AZ | 2022–23 | Eerste Divisie | 17 | 1 | — | | — | | 17 | 1 |
| Jong AZ | Total | | 56 | 2 | — | | — | | 56 | 2 |
| VVV-Venlo | 2022–23 | Eerste Divisie | 17 | 2 | 1 | 0 | 3 (Note: Appearances in Eredivisie promotion/relegation playoffs) | 0 | 21 | 2 |
| VVV-Venlo | 2023–24 | Eerste Divisie | 20 | 1 | 1 | 0 | — | | 21 | 1 |
| VVV-Venlo | 2024–25 | Eerste Divisie | 4 | 0 | 0 | 0 | — | | 4 | 0 |
| VVV-Venlo | Total | | 41 | 3 | 2 | 0 | 3 | 0 | 46 | 3 |
| Koninklijke HFC | 2025–26 | Tweede Divisie | 5 | 0 | — | | — | | 5 | 0 |
| Career total | | | 102 | 5 | 2 | 0 | 3 | 0 | 107 | 5 |
