= Özcan Yaşar =

Association footballer (born 2002)

Personal information
- Date of birth: 13 January 2002 (age 24)
- Place of birth: Loenen aan de Vecht, Netherlands
- Position: Forward

Team information
- Current team: Düzcespor
- Number: 10

Youth career
- 2008–2012: SV De Vecht
- 2012–2015: Elinkwijk
- 2015–2021: Utrecht
- 2021–2022: NAC Breda

Senior career*
| Years | Team | Apps | (Gls) |
| 2020–2021 | Jong Utrecht | 2 | (0) |
| 2022–2023 | VVV-Venlo | 26 | (0) |
| 2023–2025 | Fethiyespor | 52 | (4) |
| 2025–2026 | Zonguldakspor | 28 | (8) |
| 2026– | Düzcespor | 10 | (3) |

International career^{‡}
| 2019 | Turkey U18 | 3 | (1) |
- * Club domestic league appearances and goals as of 11:03, 12 November 2024 (UTC) ‡ National team caps and goals as of 13:17, 1 June 2020 (UTC)

Özcan Yaşar (born 13 January 2002) is a professional footballer who plays as a forward for TFF 3. Lig club Düzcespor. Raised in the Netherlands, he has represented Turkey at youth level.

Yaşar came through the youth academy of FC Utrecht and made his professional debut for Jong Utrecht in the Eerste Divisie in 2020. After a season with the under-21 side of NAC Breda, he joined VVV-Venlo in 2022 and scored the late equaliser against Willem II that sent the club into the semi-finals of the 2023 promotion play-offs. He moved to Turkey later that year and played for Fethiyespor and Zonguldakspor before joining Düzcespor in 2026.

== Club career ==
=== Early years ===
Yaşar was born on 13 January 2002 and grew up in the Netherlands. He played youth football for SV De Vecht and Elinkwijk before joining the Utrecht youth academy in 2015. He made his debut for the reserve team Jong Utrecht in the Eerste Divisie on 10 January 2020, replacing Jeredy Hilterman in the 79th minute of a 2–1 away defeat to De Graafschap.

In the summer of 2021, Yaşar moved to NAC Breda and joined its under-21 side. In October 2021, he told İstiklal that he had scored six goals in his first five league matches for the team.

=== VVV-Venlo ===
In the summer of 2022, Yaşar went on trial at VVV-Venlo, where he was reunited with head coach Rick Kruys, his former coach at Utrecht. On 16 July 2022, he signed a one-year contract with the option of a further year.

Yaşar made his debut on the opening day of the 2022–23 season, replacing Sven Braken in the 75th minute of a 3–0 home win over Almere City. He made 28 appearances for VVV that season. In the first round of the promotion play-offs, VVV won the first leg 3–2 against Willem II after trailing 2–0. In the return match on 27 May 2023, Willem II again led 2–0. Yaşar came on as a substitute and headed in the equaliser in stoppage time at the end of extra time. It was his first goal for VVV. The 2–2 draw sent VVV into the semi-finals against Almere City. Yaşar left the club at the end of the season, when he was one of ten players whose contracts were not extended.

=== Fethiyespor ===
On 14 July 2023, Yaşar signed a two-year contract with Fethiyespor of the TFF 2. Lig. On 17 September 2023, he scored in the sixth minute of stoppage time to earn a 1–1 draw away to Iğdır. On 20 April 2025, the club announced that his contract had been terminated by mutual consent.

=== Zonguldakspor ===
In August 2025, Yaşar agreed to join Zonguldakspor of the TFF 3. Lig. On 11 January 2026, he opened the scoring in a 2–0 home win over Tokat Belediyespor. In February 2026, he scored an equaliser against Düzcespor in a West Black Sea derby. Later that month, he scored twice in a 4–0 away win over 1926 Bulancakspor. He finished the season with eight goals and six assists in 30 official matches.

=== Düzcespor ===
In late July 2026, Yaşar left Zonguldakspor to join their league rivals Düzcespor. He scored in the 19th minute to give Düzcespor a 1–0 home win over Tokat Belediyespor. In the tenth round of the 2026–27 season, he was sent off in the 68th minute of a 1–1 draw away to Büyükçekmece Gücü.

== International career ==
In 2019, Yaşar played for the Turkey under-18 team in friendly matches in Portugal against Romania, Portugal and Spain, and scored against Portugal. In October 2021, he said that his only wish was to contribute by playing for the Turkey under-21 team.

== Career statistics ==
As of match played 7 November 2026

Appearances and goals by club, season and competition
| Club | Season | League | | | National cup (Note: Includes KNVB Cup, Turkish Cup) | | Other | | Total | |
| Club | Season | Division | Apps | Goals | Apps | Goals | Apps | Goals | Apps | Goals |
|---|---|---|---|---|---|---|---|---|---|---|
| Jong Utrecht | 2019–20 | Eerste Divisie | 1 | 0 | — | | — | | 1 | 0 |
| Jong Utrecht | 2020–21 | Eerste Divisie | 1 | 0 | — | | — | | 1 | 0 |
| Jong Utrecht | Total | | 2 | 0 | — | | — | | 2 | 0 |
| VVV-Venlo | 2022–23 | Eerste Divisie | 26 | 0 | 0 | 0 | 2 (Note: Appearances in Eredivisie promotion/relegation playoffs) | 1 | 28 | 1 |
| Fethiyespor | 2023–24 | TFF 2. Lig | 22 | 2 | 1 | 0 | — | | 23 | 2 |
| Fethiyespor | 2024–25 | TFF 2. Lig | 30 | 2 | 3 | 0 | — | | 33 | 2 |
| Fethiyespor | Total | | 52 | 4 | 4 | 0 | — | | 56 | 4 |
| Zonguldakspor | 2025–26 | TFF 3. Lig | 28 | 8 | 2 | 0 | — | | 30 | 8 |
| Düzcespor | 2026–27 | TFF 3. Lig | 10 | 3 | 0 | 0 | — | | 10 | 3 |
| Career total | | | 118 | 15 | 6 | 0 | 2 | 1 | 126 | 16 |
