= Marino Sabbadini =

Belgian footballer

Personal information
- Date of birth: 10 December 1969 (age 56)
- Place of birth: Belgium
- Positions: Defender; midfielder

Senior career*
Years	Team	Apps	(Gls)
-1989	K.S.K. Tongeren		
1989-1993	Beerschot A.C.	113	(8)
1993-1995	K.V. Mechelen	43	(2)
1995-1996	R.W.D. Molenbeek	29	(4)
1996/1997	MSV Duisburg	0	(0)
1996/1997	Athinaikos F.C.		
1997-1999	R.W.D. Molenbeek	26+	(4+)
1999-2000	K.S.K. Tongeren		
2000-2002	Lanaken VV		
- * Club domestic league appearances and goals

Marino Sabbadini (born 10 December 1969, in Belgium) is a Belgian retired footballer.
