= Ennio van der Gouw =

Dutch footballer (born 2000)

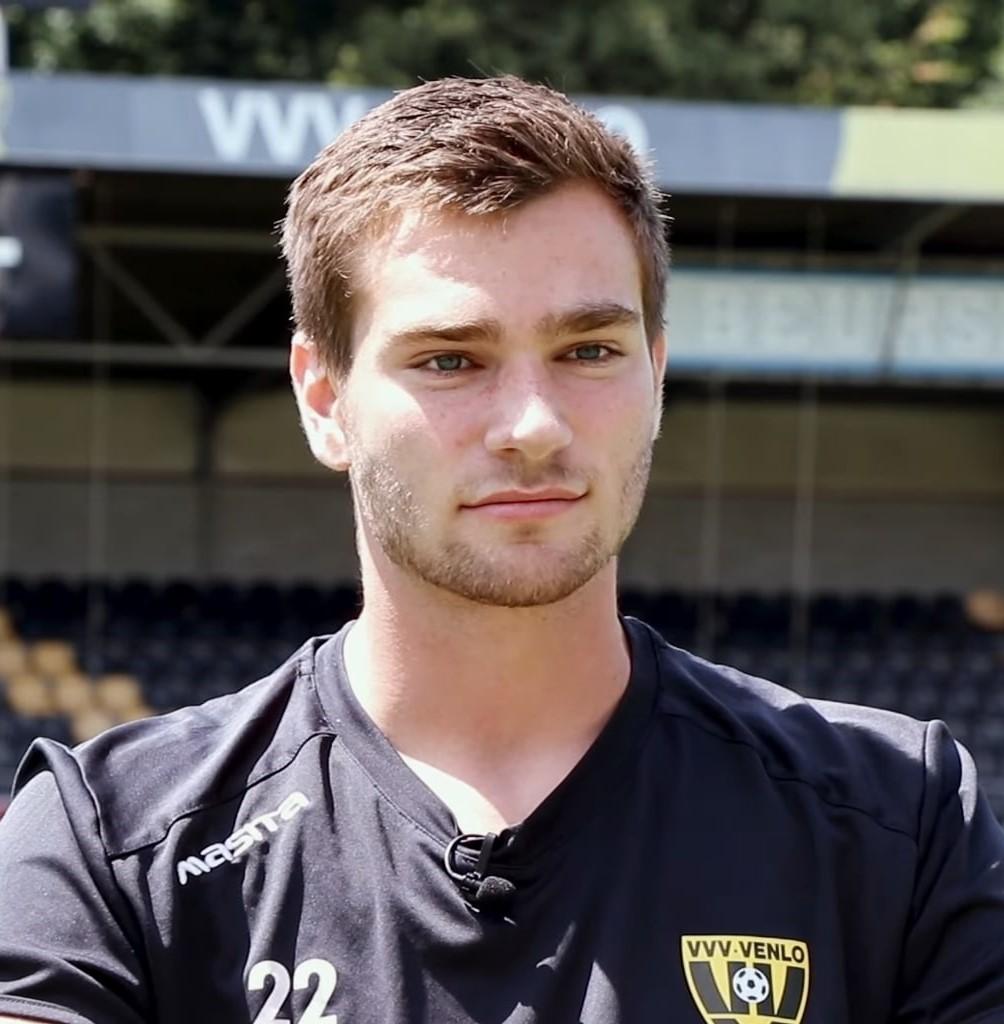
- Van der Gouw in 2022

Personal information
- Date of birth: 14 February 2000 (age 26)
- Place of birth: Stockport, England
- Height: 1.95 m (6 ft 5 in)
- Position: Goalkeeper

Team information
- Current team: Rio Ave (on loan from Zulte Waregem)
- Number: 99

Youth career
- 2014–2019: Twente

Senior career*
Years	Team	Apps	(Gls)
2019–2022	Twente	0	(0)
2022–2023	VVV-Venlo	32	(0)
2023–	Zulte Waregem	31	(0)
2026–	→ Rio Ave (loan)	10	(0)
- * Club domestic league appearances and goals as of 25 May 2026

Ennio van der Gouw (born 14 February 2000) is a Dutch professional footballer who plays as a goalkeeper for Primeira Liga club Rio Ave, on loan from Belgian side Zulte Waregem.

== Career ==
Van der Gouw came through the youth system at FC Twente after joining them in 2014. Initially he was an outfield player before switching to goalkeeper aged 14. He signed his first contract with Twente in August 2019 for 3 seasons. He made it clear he would not be looking to sign a new contract at Twente as that was drawing to a close due to the fact he was third choice behind Lars Unnerstall and Jeffrey de Lange. He made the switch to VVV-Venlo in June 2022, signing a contract for two seasons with the option of a third.

Van der Gouw made his professional debut for VVV on the 16 September 2022 in a 1–1 draw against Jong PSV in the Eerste Divisie. On 24 September 2022 van der Gouw made his first starting appearance in professional football against Telstar. Van der Gouw was credited with an assist when in the 96th minute of the game. VVV were trailing 1–0 and he came up to the opposition penalty area for his side's attacking free kick. The ball came to him and he shinned it forward in the box for teammate Sven Braken to turn and score a late equaliser.

On 12 July 2023, van der Gouw signed a four-year contract with Zulte Waregem in Belgium.

On 2 February 2026, van der Gouw moved to Portugal, joining Primeira Liga club Rio Ave on loan until the end of the season.

== Personal life ==
He is the son of Raimond van der Gouw, who was a Manchester United goalkeeper when Ennio was born in Stockport, Greater Manchester. Ennio is also a keen piano player.

== Career statistics ==
As of match played 16 May 2026

Appearances and goals by club, season and competition
Club	Season	League			Cup		Other		Total	
Club	Season	Division	Apps	Goals	Apps	Goals	Apps	Goals	Apps	Goals
Twente	2019–20	Eredivisie	0	0	0	0	—		0	0
Twente	2020–21	Eredivisie	0	0	0	0	—		0	0
Twente	2021–22	Eredivisie	0	0	0	0	—		0	0
Twente	Total		0	0	0	0	—		0	0
VVV-Venlo	2022–23	Eerste Divisie	32	0	1	0	2 (Note: Appearances in Eredivisie promotion/relegation playoffs)	0	35	0
Zulte Waregem	2023–24	Challenger Pro League	2	0	2	0	0	0	4	0
Zulte Waregem	2024–25	Challenger Pro League	29	0	0	0	—		29	0
Zulte Waregem	Total		31	0	2	0	0	0	33	0
Rio Ave (loan)	2025–26	Primeira Liga	10	0	0	0	—		10	0
Career total			73	0	3	0	2	0	78	0
