= Marco Ospitalieri =

Belgian footballer

Personal information
- Full name: Marco Ospitalieri
- Date of birth: 6 April 1992 (age 34)
- Place of birth: Maasmechelen, Belgium
- Height: 1.73 m (5 ft 8 in)
- Positions: Left back; midfielder

Team information
- Current team: Eendracht Termien
- Number: 23

Youth career
- –2001: Patro Eisden
- 2001–2014: Genk
- 2004–2012: PSV

Senior career*
Years	Team	Apps	(Gls)
2011–2013	Jong PSV	7	(0)
2012–2013	→ Eindhoven (loan)	24	(3)
2013–2015	MVV	71	(7)
2015–2019	Fortuna Sittard	86	(1)
2020	URSL Visé	4	(0)
2020–2021	Londerzeel	1	(0)
2021–2022	KFC Park Houthalen		
2022–	Eendracht Termien	62	(11)
- * Club domestic league appearances and goals as of 07:45, 25 January 2026 (UTC)

Marco Ospitalieri (born 6 April 1992) is a Belgian professional footballer who plays as a left back for Eendracht Termien.

== Career ==
=== FC Eindhoven ===
Ospitalieri started his professional career at FC Eindhoven.

=== MVV ===
On, 30 July 2013 Ospitalieri signed for MVV Maastricht.

=== Fortuna Sittard ===
On 31 August 2015, Ospitalieri joined Fortuna Sittard in a 2-year deal.

== Personal life ==
Ospitalieri is of Italian descent.

== See also ==
- List of foreign football players in the Netherlands
- 2013–14 MVV Maastricht season
- 2019–20 Fortuna Sittard season
