= Robert Klaasen =

Dutch footballer (born 1993)

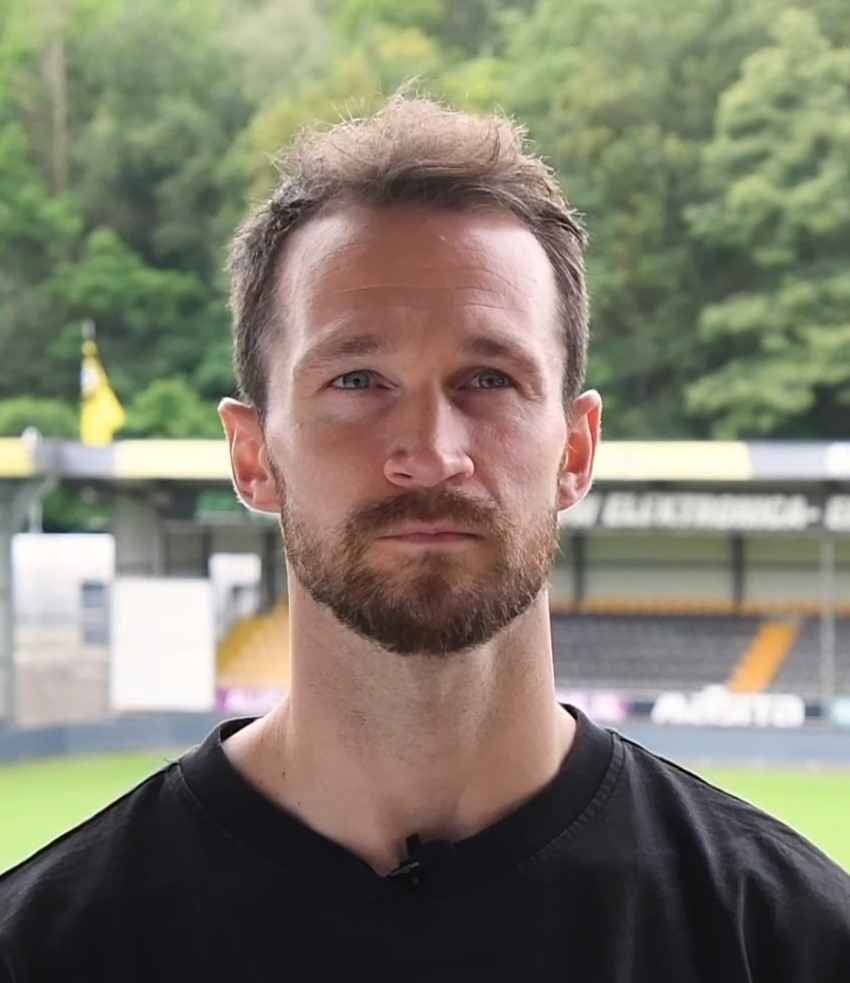
- Klaasen in 2022

Personal information
- Date of birth: 6 September 1993 (age 33)
- Place of birth: Amsterdam, Netherlands
- Height: 1.77 m (5 ft 10 in)
- Position: Midfielder

Team information
- Current team: MVV
- Number: 38

Youth career
- 1999–2000: Zeeburgia
- 2000–2005: Ajax
- 2005–2006: HFC Haarlem
- 2006–2007: Feyenoord
- 2007–2013: AZ

Senior career*
Years	Team	Apps	(Gls)
2013–2016	Kortrijk	36	(1)
2016–2017	Sparta Rotterdam	5	(1)
2017	→ De Graafschap (loan)	16	(0)
2017–2019	De Graafschap	32	(0)
2019–2022	Roda JC	100	(4)
2022–2024	VVV-Venlo	48	(2)
2025–	MVV	50	(1)

International career
2011–2013	Netherlands U18	6	(1)
- * Club domestic league appearances and goals as of 28 April 2026

Robert Klaasen (born 6 September 1993) is a Dutch professional footballer who plays as a midfielder for Eerste Divisie club MVV. He most notably played for Kortrijk, De Graafschap, Roda JC and VVV-Venlo.

== Career ==
=== Early years ===
Klaasen started his football career at the age of six at Zeeburgia. He left the club after a year for Ajax's youth academy. After playing in Amsterdam for five years, he moved to the youth academy of HFC Haarlem. There he played one year in the academy before moving to Feyenoord in 2006.

He then joined AZ from Feyenoord's youth academy in 2007, and signed a two-year senior contract with the club on 19 May 2011. Coming through the AZ academy, Klaasen described himself as a "holding midfielder, with a good shot and vision. I can be compared to Stijn Schaars." Ahead of the 2012–13 season, some of the club's talents, including Klaasen, were given the chance to join the first team's pre-season friendlies. He would, however, play the season with the youth team. At the end of the season, Klaasen's contract was terminated.

=== Kortrijk ===
Prior to the start of the 2013–14 season, Klaassen trialled with Kortrijk. He tested for around four weeks before it was announced that he became part of the team, signing a three-year contract on 20 July 2013. Klaasen made his professional debut on 27 July 2013, replacing Gertjan De Mets in the 78th minute of a 1–0 home win over OH Leuven. On 7 December 2013, four months after his last appearance, he scored his first goal in professional football, the 1–1 equalizer in the 87th minute against Sporting Charleroi. He made his first start on 22 February 2014, playing the full ninety minutes against Mons.

=== Sparta Rotterdam ===
On 8 January 2016, Klaasen moved to Sparta Rotterdam, where he signed a contract until the end of the season with an option to extend for two seasons. He made his debut for the club ten days later, on 18 January, replacing Ryan Sanusi in the 83rd minute of a 5–2 victory over RKC Waalwijk in the Eerste Divisie. His first start came in the 2–1 league win at FC Den Bosch on 31 January. On 12 February, Klaasen scored his first goal for Sparta in a 3–0 away win over Achilles '29. Sparta picked up the option in Klaasen's contract on 22 February, extending his contract until 2018.

Klaasen made five appearances for Sparta that, scoring once, as the club won the Eerste Divisie and reached promotion to the Eredivisie.

=== De Graafschap ===
On 26 January 2017, Klaasen was sent on a six-month loan until the end of the season to De Graafschap, competing in the Eerste Divisie. He made his debut for the club as a starter in a 3–2 league loss to Jong FC Utrecht on 30 January 2017. He signed a permanent deal with the club on 2 May 2017, a one-year contract with an option for an additional season.

On 11 May 2018, Klaasen extended his contract with De Graafschap until 2019. Upon signing, technical director Peter Hofstede stated: "Robert has made strides this season. We think he can grow further and want to give him that chance here."

=== Roda JC ===
On 7 July 2019, Klaasen joined Eerste Divisie club Roda JC on a two-year contract. He made his debut for the club on the first matchday of the season as a starter in the 1–1 home draw against Almere City.

Klaasen scored his first goal for Roda JC on 5 December 2020, opening the score from a free kick in a 1–1 draw away against Jong PSV.

=== VVV-Venlo ===
Klaasen moved to VVV-Venlo on 10 June 2022, signing a two-year contract. His club debut came on the first matchday of the 2022–23 season in a 3–0 home win over Almere City. On 11 December, he scored his first goal for the club, helping the club to a 2–1 victory against provincial rivals MVV Maastricht.

=== MVV ===
On 2 January 2025, Klaasen signed a contract with Eerste Divisie club MVV until June 2025, ending six months as a free agent.

== Personal life ==
Klaasen is the son-in-law of Wilco van Schaik, who became chairman of NEC Nijmegen in 2017.

== Career statistics ==
As of match played 5 December 2025

Appearances and goals by club, season and competition
Club	Season	League			National cup (Note: Includes Belgian Cup, KNVB Cup)		Other		Total	
Club	Season	Division	Apps	Goals	Apps	Goals	Apps	Goals	Apps	Goals
Kortrijk	2013–14	Belgian Pro League	15	1	0	0	—		15	1
Kortrijk	2014–15	Belgian Pro League	21	0	1	0	—		22	0
Kortrijk	Total		36	1	1	0	—		37	1
Sparta Rotterdam	2015–16	Eerste Divisie	5	1	0	0	—		5	1
Sparta Rotterdam	2016–17	Eredivisie	0	0	0	0	—		0	0
Sparta Rotterdam	Total		5	1	0	0	—		5	1
De Graafschap (loan)	2016–17	Eerste Divisie	16	0	0	0	—		16	0
De Graafschap	2017–18	Eerste Divisie	22	0	1	0	4 (Note: Appearances in Eerste Divisie playoffs)	0	27	0
De Graafschap	2018–19	Eredivisie	10	0	1	0	0	0	11	0
De Graafschap	Total		48	0	2	0	4	0	54	0
Roda JC	2019–20	Eerste Divisie	28	0	1	0	—		29	4
Roda JC	2020–21	Eerste Divisie	37	2	1	0	2	0	40	2
Roda JC	2021–22	Eerste Divisie	35	2	2	0	2	0	39	2
Roda JC	Total		100	4	4	0	4	0	108	4
VVV-Venlo	2022–23	Eerste Divisie	33	2	1	0	4	0	38	2
VVV-Venlo	2023–24	Eerste Divisie	15	0	1	0	—		16	0
VVV-Venlo	Total		48	2	2	0	4	0	54	2
MVV	2024–25	Eerste Divisie	18	1	0	0	—		18	1
MVV	2025–26	Eerste Divisie	19	0	0	0	—		19	0
MVV	Total		37	1	0	0	—		37	1
Career total			274	9	1	0	12	0	295	9

== Honours ==
Sparta Rotterdam

- Eerste Divisie: 2015–16
