= Jens Jacobs =

Dutch footballer (born 2003)

Personal information
- Date of birth: 19 November 2003 (age 22)
- Place of birth: Maasbree, Netherlands
- Height: 1.79 m (5 ft 10 in)
- Position: Right-back

Team information
- Current team: Wittenhorst

Youth career
- 2008–2014: MVC '19
- 2014–2022: VVV-Venlo

Senior career*
Years	Team	Apps	(Gls)
2022–2024	VVV-Venlo	2	(0)
2025–	Wittenhorst		
- * Club domestic league appearances and goals as of 21 August 2022

Jens Jacobs (born 19 November 2003) is a Dutch footballer who plays as a right-back for Vierde Divisie club Wittenhorst.

== Career ==
Jacobs was born in Maasbree, Limburg, and began his footballing development with local side MVC '19. In December 2014, he joined the youth academy of VVV-Venlo, where he progressed through the ranks.

Ahead of the 2022–23 season, Jacobs was included in the first-team squad by newly appointed head coach Rick Kruys. He made his professional debut on 5 August 2022, coming on as a substitute in a 3–0 victory over Almere City. Jacobs made his second appearance on 21 August 2022 in a match against PEC Zwolle. Brought on early due to an injury to teammate Sem Dirks, he inadvertently scored an own goal and was later sent off for a second bookable offence before half-time, as VVV suffered a 4–0 defeat. In October 2022, Jacobs was officially promoted to the first team alongside fellow academy graduate Luuk Vosselman. However, due in part to injuries, he did not make any further senior appearances and left the club in 2024.

Following a spell training with De Treffers, Jacobs signed with Wittenhorst of the Vierde Divisie in February 2025.

== Personal life ==
Jacobs is also a successful esports player. In January 2021, he was prolific in the Weekend League of the video game FIFA 21, winning all 30 games he played on PlayStation. This ranked him 37th place worldwide.

== Career statistics ==
As of match played 21 August 2022

Appearances and goals by club, season and competition
Club	Season	League			Cup		Other		Total	
Club	Season	Division	Apps	Goals	Apps	Goals	Apps	Goals	Apps	Goals
VVV-Venlo	2022–23	Eerste Divisie	2	0	0	0	0	0	2	0
Career total			2	0	0	0	0	0	2	0
