= Lance Voorjans =

Dutch footballer (born 1990)

Personal information
- Date of birth: 26 December 1990 (age 35)
- Place of birth: Maastricht, Netherlands
- Height: 1.78 m (5 ft 10 in)
- Position: Midfielder

Team information
- Current team: Lanaken

Youth career
- RKVVL
- SC Jekerdal
- MVV

Senior career*
Years	Team	Apps	(Gls)
2008–2013	MVV	81	(8)
2013–2014	KFC Uerdingen 05	28	(3)
2014–2017	Spouwen-Mopertingen		
2017–2018	Bocholter VV		
2018–2020	Hades Hasselt	18	(3)
2020–2022	Belisia Bilzen	15	(2)
2022–2024	Tongeren	69	(18)
2024–	Lanaken	22	(17)
- * Club domestic league appearances and goals as of 18:40, 27 January 2025 (UTC)

Lance Voorjans (born 26 December 1990) is a Dutch footballer who plays as a midfielder for Lanaken.

== Career ==
Born in Maastricht, Voorjans started his career as a youth prospect of the city's main club, MVV. After being released by the club in the 2013–14 season, he moved to German Regionalliga side KFC Uerdingen 05. Voorjans played for lower-tier Belgian club Spouwen-Mopertingen from 2014 to 2017 and then joined Bocholter VV. In 2018, he moved to Hades Hasselt, before returning to Spouwen-Mopertingen in 2020, which was renamed Belisia Bilzen the following year. In 2022, he moved to Tongeren. He started playing for Lanaken in 2024.

== After football ==
Besides playing football on amateur level since 2014, Voorjans has worked for industrial engineering company Flexprof in Maastricht together with fellow former MVV player Lloyd Borgers.
