= Lloyd Borgers =

Dutch footballer

Personal information
- Date of birth: 24 February 1993 (age 33)
- Place of birth: Maastricht, Netherlands
- Height: 1.80 m (5 ft 11 in)
- Position: Forward

Team information
- Current team: RKSV Heer

Youth career
- SC Jekerdal
- Leonidas
- MVV

Senior career*
Years	Team	Apps	(Gls)
2010–2013	MVV	39	(6)
2013	EHC		
2014	Esperanza Pelt		
2014–2015	Lutlommel VV		
2015–2020	Meerssen		
2020–	RKSV Heer		
- * Club domestic league appearances and goals as of 3 February 2026

Lloyd Borgers (born 24 February 1993) is a Dutch footballer who plays as a forward for RKSV Heer Maastricht.

== Club career ==
Borgers played professional football for MVV Maastricht. He was released by MVV in 2013 and subsequently joined Hoofdklasse side EHC. He later played for Belgian Vierde Klasse side VV Neerpelt before moving to SV Meerssen in 2015. He left them after 5 seasons for Heer.

== Personal life ==
Since 2013, Borgers has played football at an amateur level, and gas also worked for Flexprof, an industrial engineering company in Maastricht together, alongside fellow former MVV player Lance Voorjans. In 2026, Borgers was the first former MVV-player who was chosen Prince Carnival. He lives in Heer with his wife Joëlle Ringhs and their two sons.
