= Sjoerd Winkens =

Dutch footballer

Personal information
- Full name: Sjoerd Winkens
- Date of birth: 4 May 1983 (age 43)
- Place of birth: Geleen, Netherlands
- Height: 1.85 m (6 ft 1 in)
- Position: Left back

Youth career
- RVU
- MVV

Senior career*
Years	Team	Apps	(Gls)
2001–2009	MVV	203	(1)
2009–2011	Helmond Sport	53	(2)
2011–2014	MVV Maastricht	61	(2)
- * Club domestic league appearances and goals as of 8 May 2014 (UTC)

Sjoerd Winkens (born 4 May 1983) is a Dutch former professional footballer who played as a left back. Winkens started his career with MVV Maastricht. He played two seasons for Helmond Sport, but he returned to MVV after two years. In June 2014, he retired from professional football.
