= İstiklal =

Turkish newspaper

Istiklal Newspaper
- Founder: İSTİKLAL MEDYA YAYINCILIK A.Ş.
- Editor-in-chief: Hüseyin Arif ÇAKMAK
- General manager: Seçkin ŞENGÜR
- Founded: 1974
- Language: Turkish
- City: Istanbul
- Country: Turkey
- Website: https://www.istiklal.com.tr

İstiklal (lit. 'independence') is a national Turkish daily newspaper published in Istanbul, Turkey. İstiklal is a local newspaper founded in 1974. The publishing center of the newspaper is located in Zeytinburnu district.
