= Kees de Boer =

Dutch footballer (born 2000)

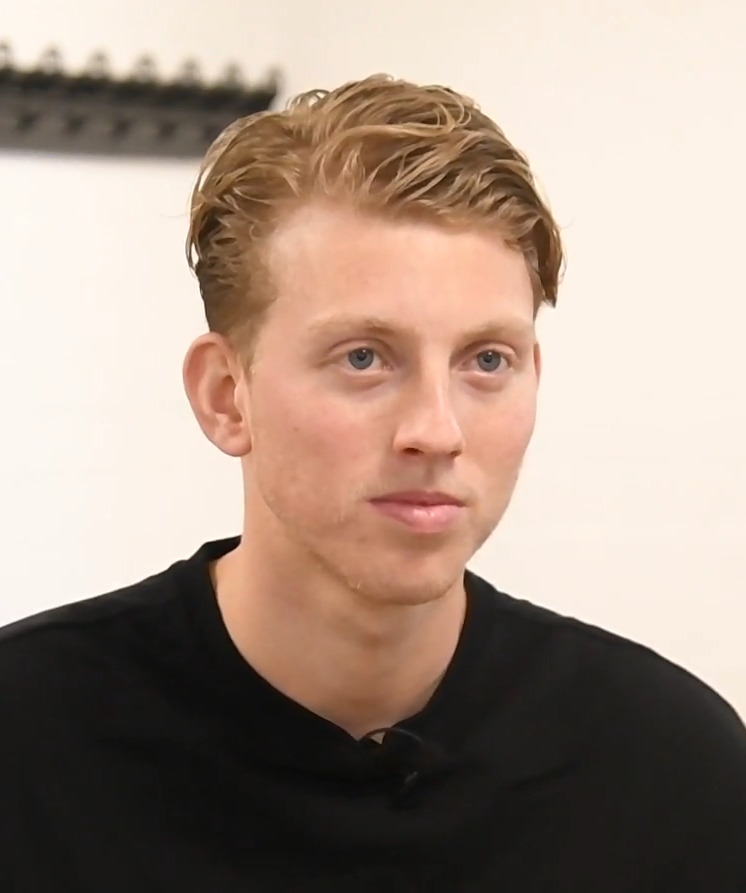
- De Boer in 2023

Personal information
- Full name: Cornelis Henricus Johannes de Boer
- Date of birth: 13 May 2000 (age 26)
- Place of birth: Volendam, Netherlands
- Height: 1.86 m (6 ft 1 in)
- Position: Midfielder

Team information
- Current team: Salernitana
- Number: 6

Youth career
- –2011: Volendam
- 2011–2017: Ajax
- 2017–2020: Swansea City

Senior career*
Years	Team	Apps	(Gls)
2019–2020	Swansea City	0	(0)
2020–2021	ADO Den Haag	20	(0)
2021–2023	VVV-Venlo	67	(7)
2023–2025	Ternana	57	(1)
2025–	Salernitana	27	(2)

International career
2015	Netherlands U15	2	(0)
- * Club domestic league appearances and goals as of 1 May 2026

Cornelis Henricus Johannes "Kees" de Boer (born 13 May 2000) is a Dutch professional footballer who plays as a midfielder for Italian Serie C Group C club Salernitana.

== Club career ==
=== Swansea City ===
De Boer played youth football for FC Volendam, Ajax and Swansea City. He made his professional debut for Swansea's first team in a 3–1 home win over Northampton Town at Liberty Stadium in the EFL Cup. De Boer replaced Yan Dhanda in the 90th minute.

=== ADO Den Haag ===
On 2 June 2020, De Boer signed a two-year contract with Eredivisie club ADO Den Haag, after his contract with Swansea had expired. He made his ADO league debut on 13 September 2020 in a 2–0 away loss to Heracles Almelo.

After a disastrous season, in which ADO finished bottom of the league and suffered relegation to the Eerste Divisie, De Boer exercised a relegation option in his contract to leave the club as a free agent.

=== VVV-Venlo ===
De Boer joined VVV-Venlo, who had suffered relegation alongside ADO, on 6 July 2021, signing a two-year contract with an option for an additional season. He was in the starting lineup on his debut for the club, a 2–2 home draw on the opening day of the 2021–22 season.

De Boer left VVV at the end of the 2022–23 season, as his contract was not extended.

=== Ternana ===
On 15 September 2023, De Boer officially joined Italian side Ternana on a free transfer, signing a one-year contract with the club, with an option for another season.

== International career ==
De Boer is a Netherlands youth international, having gained two caps at under-15 level. On 10 February 2015, he made his debut for the Netherlands U15 in a 1–1 friendly draw against Serbia U15, providing the assist for Jurgen Ekkelenkamp's equalizer from his corner kick.

== Career statistics ==
As of match played 3 June 2023

Appearances and goals by club, season and competition
Club	Season	League			National cup		League cup		Other		Total	
Club	Season	Division	Apps	Goals	Apps	Goals	Apps	Goals	Apps	Goals	Apps	Goals
Swansea City U23	2018–19	—			—		—		1 (Note: Appearance in EFL Trophy)	0	1	0
Swansea City	2019–20	Championship	0	0	0	0	1	0	0	0	1	0
ADO Den Haag	2020–21	Eredivisie	20	0	1	0	—		—		21	0
VVV-Venlo	2021–22	Eerste Divisie	32	0	1	0	—		—		33	0
VVV-Venlo	2022–23	Eerste Divisie	35	7	1	0	—		4 (Note: Appearances in Eredivisie promotion/relegation playoffs)	0	40	7
VVV-Venlo	Total		67	7	2	0	—		4	0	73	7
Career total			87	7	3	0	1	0	5	0	96	7
