= Thijme Verheijen =

Dutch footballer (born 2003)

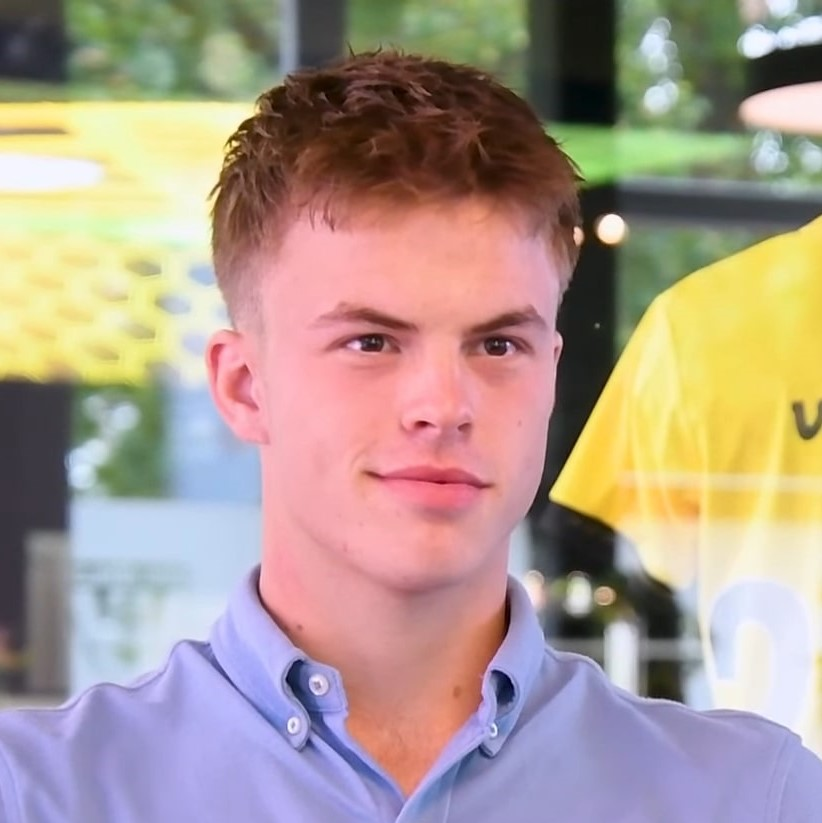
- Verheijen in 2022

Personal information
- Date of birth: 13 April 2003 (age 23)
- Place of birth: Helmond, Netherlands
- Position: Midfielder

Team information
- Current team: MVV
- Number: 11

Youth career
- 2008–2012: RKVPVV
- 2012–2015: Helmond Sport
- 2015–2020: VVV-Venlo

Senior career*
Years	Team	Apps	(Gls)
2020–2025	VVV-Venlo	72	(8)
2025–	MVV	23	(2)
- * Club domestic league appearances and goals as of 28 April 2026

Thijme Verheijen (born 13 April 2003) is a Dutch professional footballer who plays as a midfielder for Eerste Divisie club MVV.

== Career ==
=== VVV-Venlo ===
Verheijen joined the youth academy of VVV-Venlo in 2015, having previously been scouted by Helmond Sport while playing for amateur side RKPVV. He progressed through the club's youth system and was promoted to the first-team squad ahead of the 2020–21 season.

He made his senior debut for the club on 13 August 2021 in the Eerste Divisie, starting as a left winger in a 2–1 away loss to TOP Oss at the Frans Heesen Stadion. Verheijen scored his first professional goal on 12 August 2022, netting the equaliser in a 2–1 away victory over De Graafschap at the De Vijverberg.

His performances early in the 2022–23 Eerste Divisie season earned widespread praise in the Dutch media, where he was described as one of the revelations of the campaign's opening phase. He was noted in particular for his late attacking runs into the penalty area and strength in individual duels.

On 15 September 2022, Verheijen signed his first professional contract with VVV-Venlo, running until June 2024 with an option for a further year. Later that season, he suffered a long-term injury that ruled him out for large parts of the second half of the campaign. Despite the setback, Verheijen was awarded the Jan Klaassens Award in August 2023, recognising him as the club's most promising youth player. He returned from injury on 1 September 2023, coming on as a substitute in a 2–0 home win over De Graafschap.

On 3 May 2024, Verheijen extended his contract with VVV-Venlo until July 2026. During the second half of the 2024–25 Eerste Divisie season, however, he fell out of the starting lineup. His contract was terminated by mutual consent in June 2025, allowing him to sign with league rivals MVV.

=== MVV ===
On 25 June 2025, Verheijen signed a two-year contract with MVV, with an option for a third season, continuing in the Eerste Divisie. He made his competitive debut for the club on the opening matchday of the 2025–26 season, starting in a 4–0 away defeat to TOP Oss. On 3 October 2025, Verheijen scored his first goal for MVV, heading in a corner kick in the 92nd minute of a 3–1 home victory over FC Eindhoven.

== Career statistics ==
As of match played 19 December 2025

Appearances and goals by club, season and competition
Club	Season	League			National cup		Other		Total	
Club	Season	Division	Apps	Goals	Apps	Goals	Apps	Goals	Apps	Goals
VVV-Venlo	2021–22	Eerste Divisie	6	0	0	0	—		6	0
VVV-Venlo	2022–23	Eerste Divisie	17	2	1	1	0	0	18	3
VVV-Venlo	2023–24	Eerste Divisie	24	3	0	0	—		24	3
VVV-Venlo	2024–25	Eerste Divisie	25	3	1	0	—		26	3
VVV-Venlo	Total		72	8	2	1	0	0	74	9
MVV	2025–26	Eerste Divisie	15	2	1	0	—		16	2
Career total			87	10	3	1	0	0	90	11
