= Lanaken VV =

Koninklijke Lanaken VV
- Full name: Koninklijke Lanaken Voetbalvereniging
- Founded: 1924

Koninklijke Lanaken Voetbalvereniging is an association football club based in Lanaken, Belgium.

== History ==
Lanaken VV was founded in 1924. Since 1925, the club has been officially affiliated with the Koninklijke Belgische Voetbalbond under registration number 1050.
