= Simon Janssen =

Dutch footballer (born 2000)

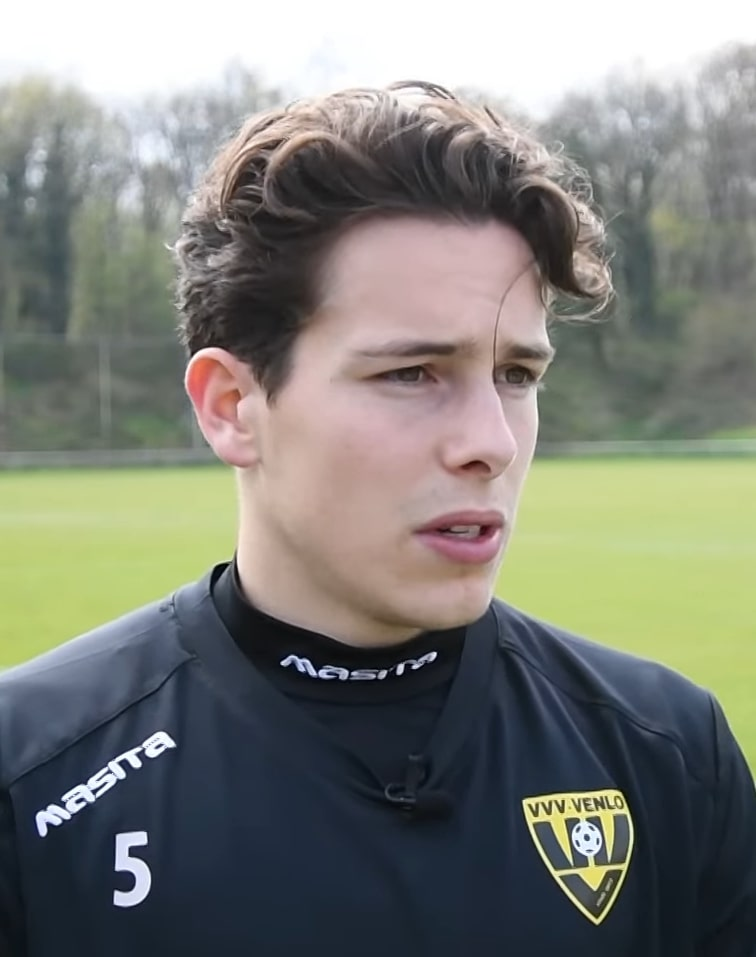
- Janssen in 2023

Personal information
- Date of birth: 25 September 2000 (age 26)
- Place of birth: Blerick, Netherlands
- Height: 1.79 m (5 ft 10 in)
- Positions: Left-back; midfielder

Team information
- Current team: Excelsior
- Number: 15

Youth career
- –2010: SV Blerick
- 2010–2018: VVV-Venlo

Senior career*
| Years | Team | Apps | (Gls) |
| 2018–2025 | VVV-Venlo | 168 | (4) |
| 2025– | Excelsior | 13 | (0) |
- * Club domestic league appearances and goals as of 26 April 2026

Simon Janssen (born 25 September 2000) is a Dutch professional footballer who plays as a left-back for Eredivisie club Excelsior.

== Career ==
Janssen joined the VVV-Venlo academy from SV Blerick in 2010. He made his senior debut on his 18th birthday, 25 September 2018, coming on as a substitute in a 3–0 KNVB Cup win over Westlandia. He made his Eredivisie debut on 6 December 2018 in a 4–1 loss to Feyenoord, replacing Evert Linthorst.

In April 2019, Janssen signed a two-year contract with an option for a third. Later that year, he received the Jan Klaassens Award, given annually to the club's best youth player.

In March 2021, VVV exercised the contract option, and in December that year, Janssen signed a new deal until 2024, with an option for one more year. Originally a central midfielder, he was converted to a left-back by head coach Jos Luhukay.

On 17 February 2023, Janssen scored his first professional goal, netting a stoppage-time winner in a 2–1 away victory over Dordrecht.

Janssen left VVV-Venlo at the end of the 2024–25 Eerste Divisie season following the expiry of his contract. During his time at the club, he made 182 competitive appearances and scored five goals. At 24, he expressed a desire to pursue a new challenge.

On 1 September 2025, Janssen signed a two-year contract with Excelsior.

== Career statistics ==
As of match played 9 May 2025

Appearances and goals by club, season and competition
| Club | Season | League | | | KNVB Cup | | Other | | Total | |
| Club | Season | Division | Apps | Goals | Apps | Goals | Apps | Goals | Apps | Goals |
|---|---|---|---|---|---|---|---|---|---|---|
| VVV-Venlo | 2018–19 | Eredivisie | 1 | 0 | 1 | 0 | — | | 2 | 0 |
| VVV-Venlo | 2019–20 | Eredivisie | 7 | 0 | 0 | 0 | — | | 7 | 0 |
| VVV-Venlo | 2020–21 | Eredivisie | 19 | 0 | 4 | 0 | — | | 23 | 0 |
| VVV-Venlo | 2021–22 | Eerste Divisie | 36 | 0 | 1 | 0 | — | | 37 | 0 |
| VVV-Venlo | 2022–23 | Eerste Divisie | 36 | 1 | 2 | 0 | 4 (Note: Appearances in Eredivisie promotion/relegation playoffs) | 0 | 42 | 0 |
| VVV-Venlo | 2023–24 | Eerste Divisie | 37 | 2 | 1 | 0 | — | | 38 | 2 |
| VVV-Venlo | 2024–25 | Eerste Divisie | 32 | 2 | 1 | 0 | — | | 33 | 2 |
| Career total | | | 168 | 5 | 10 | 0 | 4 | 0 | 182 | 5 |
