= Sven Braken =

Dutch footballer (born 1993)

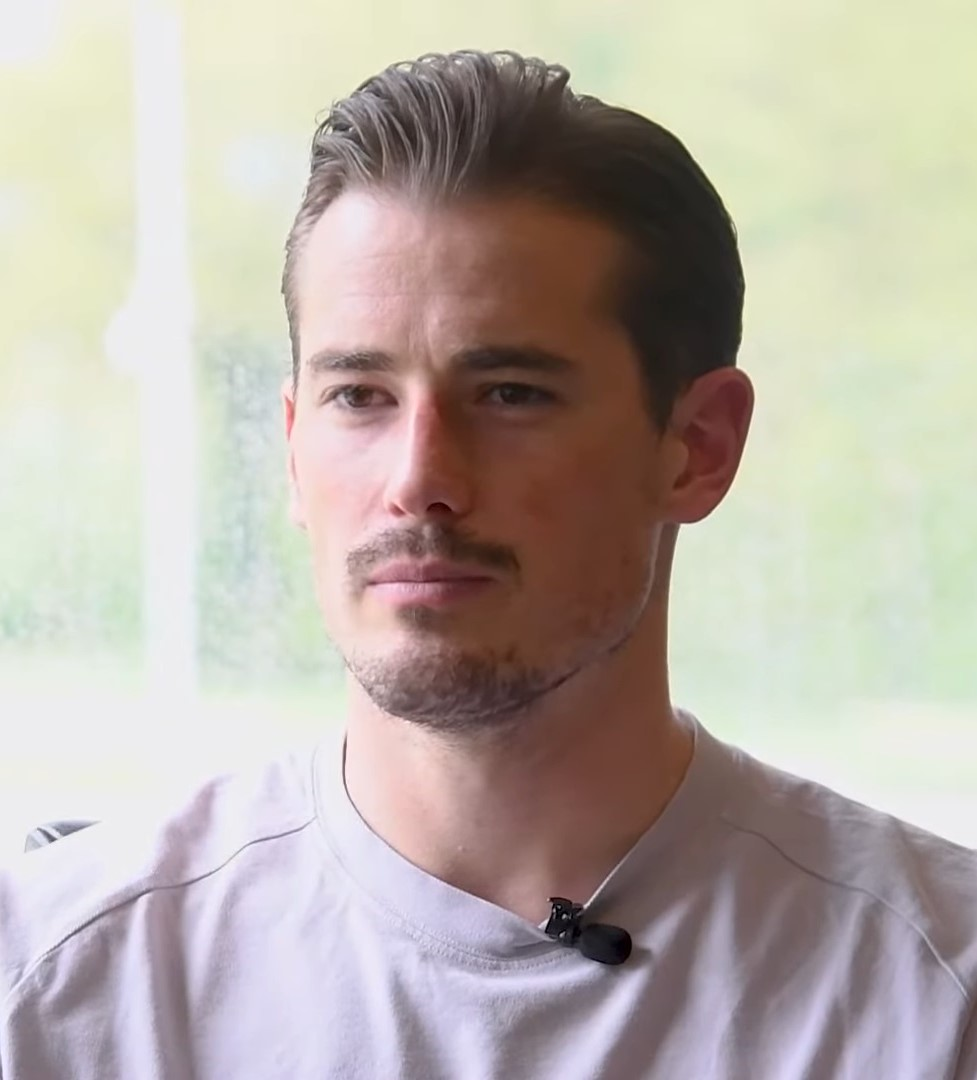
- Braken in 2023

Personal information
- Full name: Sven André Marie Braken
- Date of birth: 12 June 1993 (age 33)
- Place of birth: Maastricht, Netherlands
- Height: 1.87 m (6 ft 2 in)
- Position: Striker

Youth career
- SC Jekerdal
- –2004: RKSV Leonidas-Wolder
- 2004–2011: MVV

Senior career*
| Years | Team | Apps | (Gls) |
| 2011–2015 | MVV | 95 | (17) |
| 2015–2017 | Almere City | 16 | (11) |
| 2017–2019 | NEC | 52 | (21) |
| 2019 | → Emmen (loan) | 12 | (2) |
| 2019–2021 | Livorno | 49 | (7) |
| 2021–2023 | VVV-Venlo | 59 | (24) |
| 2023–2024 | Deinze | 21 | (2) |
| 2024–2026 | MVV | 68 | (18) |
- * Club domestic league appearances and goals as of 28 April 2026

Sven André Marie Braken (born 12 June 1992) is a Dutch professional footballer who plays as a striker. He most notably played for NEC, Livorno, VVV-Venlo, and Deinze.

== Career ==
=== MVV ===
Braken was born in Maastricht, and made his professional debut for hometown club MVV on 22 April 2011 in a 2–1 home win over Telstar in the Eerste Divisie, replacing the injured Lance Voorjans in the 40th minute.

He scored his first goal for the club on 23 November 2012, delivering the equalizer on his first touch in the 73rd minute of a league game against Go Ahead Eagles – one minute after coming on as a substitute for Bryan Smeets, as the game ended in a 3–3 draw.

Braken played five seasons for MVV, in which he made 95 appearances and scored 17 goals.

=== Almere City ===
On 16 June 2015, Braken joined Almere City after failing to reach an agreement over a contract extension with MVV. He made his debut for the club, also making his first start, on 7 August in a 3–3 home draw against VVV-Venlo in the Eerste Divisie. On 21 September, his second game for City, he scored his first goals for the club, a brace in a 2–2 away draw against Telstar. Braken sustained a knee injury in a league game against Go Ahead Eagles on 23 October, ruling him out for the remainder of the 2015–16 season.

Braken's time with Almere City was marked by injuries, and he only made sixteen appearances during his two years with the club. He proved himself productive in limited time on the pitch, scoring eleven goals.

=== NEC ===
On 16 August 2017, Braken signed a four-year contract with NEC, who had recently been relegated from the Eredivisie. There, he was seen as a replacement for outgoing strikers Taiwo Awoniyi, Kévin Mayi and Jay-Roy Grot. He made his debut for the club on 25 August, immediately scoring his first goal in the 11th minute of play in a 1–1 away draw against Go Ahead Eagles. In the following match he scored a brace, bringing his tally to three goals in two appearances.

==== Loan to Emmen ====
Braken joined Eredivisie club Emmen on a six-month loan deal on 23 January 2019. Emmen were struggling in the bottom half of the league table and needed a goalscorer, which they found in Braken who was season top goalscorer for NEC with nine goals in 19 appearances. He made his debut for the club on 26 January, replacing Jafar Arias in the 81st minute of a 3–2 away victory against VVV-Venlo. He made his first start for the club on 10 February, also scoring his first goal for Emmen in a 3–2 home win over ADO Den Haag.

==== Return to NEC ====
After managing survival in the Eredivisie with Emmen, Braken returned to NEC for the 2019–20 season. He made three more appearances for the club, scoring once, amidst rumours of a transfer to Querétaro, which eventually fell through in July 2019.

=== Livorno ===
On 2 September 2019, Braken signed with Italian Serie B club Livorno. He made his debut for the club, starting in a 2–0 away loss to Ascoli in Serie B on 14 September. On 18 January 2020, Braken scored his first goal for Livorno in a 4–4 home draw against Virtus Entella after an assist by Murilo. Livorno would finish bottom of Serie B, which meant relegation to Serie C.

Braken continued playing for the club in its season in Serie C, contributing with 24 appearances in which he scored six goals. Despite his efforts, Livorno suffered its second successive relegation amid financial irregularities. He made a total of 50 appearances for the club, scoring seven goals, as his contract with the club expired after the 2020–21 season.

=== VVV-Venlo ===
On 26 June 2021, Braken returned to the Netherlands where signed a two-year contract with recently relegated Eerste Divisie club VVV-Venlo. He scored his first career hat-trick on 15 April 2022, helping his side to a 3–2 league win over Telstar. With eleven goals in 27 appearances, Braken finished his first season with VVV as club top goalscorer, his most notable a bicycle kick against former club MVV on 4 February 2022. His goal was later awarded Goal of the Season by the Eerste Divisie.

Ahead of the 2022–23 season, Braken was appointed team captain of VVV by new head coach Rick Kruys.

=== Deinze ===
On 29 April 2023, it was announced that Braken had signed a two-year contract with Belgian second division club Deinze, effective as of June 2023. The deal included an option to extend by a further year.

=== Return to MVV ===
On 25 July 2024, Braken returned to MVV and signed a two-year contract. He made his return debut for De Sterrendragers on 9 August, starting in a 1–0 home loss to Cambuur on the opening matchday.

== Career statistics ==
As of match played 19 December 2025

Appearances and goals by club, season and competition
| Club | Season | League | | | National cup (Note: Includes KNVB Cup, Coppa Italia) | | Other | | Total | |
| Club | Season | Division | Apps | Goals | Apps | Goals | Apps | Goals | Apps | Goals |
|---|---|---|---|---|---|---|---|---|---|---|
| MVV | 2010–11 | Eerste Divisie | 3 | 0 | 0 | 0 | — | | 3 | 0 |
| MVV | 2011–12 | Eerste Divisie | 5 | 0 | 1 | 0 | 2 (Note: Appearances in Eerste Divisie playoffs) | 0 | 8 | 0 |
| MVV | 2012–13 | Eerste Divisie | 21 | 3 | 1 | 0 | 2 | 0 | 24 | 3 |
| MVV | 2013–14 | Eerste Divisie | 32 | 7 | 2 | 1 | — | | 34 | 8 |
| MVV | 2014–15 | Eerste Divisie | 34 | 7 | 2 | 0 | — | | 36 | 7 |
| MVV | Total | | 95 | 17 | 6 | 1 | 4 | 0 | 105 | 18 |
| Almere City | 2015–16 | Eerste Divisie | 10 | 5 | 1 | 1 | — | | 11 | 6 |
| Almere City | 2016–17 | Eerste Divisie | 6 | 6 | 1 | 0 | 1 | 0 | 8 | 6 |
| Almere City | Total | | 16 | 11 | 2 | 1 | 1 | 0 | 19 | 12 |
| NEC | 2017–18 | Eerste Divisie | 30 | 11 | 1 | 2 | 2 | 0 | 33 | 13 |
| NEC | 2018–19 | Eerste Divisie | 19 | 9 | 2 | 2 | — | | 21 | 11 |
| NEC | 2019–20 | Eerste Divisie | 3 | 1 | 0 | 0 | — | | 3 | 1 |
| NEC | Total | | 52 | 21 | 3 | 4 | 2 | 0 | 57 | 25 |
| Emmen (loan) | 2018–19 | Eredivisie | 12 | 2 | 0 | 0 | — | | 12 | 2 |
| Livorno | 2019–20 | Serie B | 25 | 1 | 0 | 0 | — | | 25 | 1 |
| Livorno | 2020–21 | Serie C | 24 | 6 | 1 | 0 | — | | 25 | 6 |
| Livorno | Total | | 49 | 7 | 1 | 0 | — | | 50 | 7 |
| VVV-Venlo | 2021–22 | Eerste Divisie | 27 | 11 | 1 | 0 | — | | 28 | 11 |
| VVV-Venlo | 2022–23 | Eerste Divisie | 32 | 13 | 1 | 1 | 4 | 2 | 37 | 16 |
| VVV-Venlo | Total | | 59 | 24 | 2 | 1 | 4 | 2 | 65 | 27 |
| Deinze | 2023–24 | Challenger Pro League | 21 | 2 | 1 | 0 | — | | 22 | 2 |
| MVV | 2024–25 | Eerste Divisie | 34 | 11 | 2 | 0 | — | | 36 | 11 |
| MVV | 2025–26 | Eerste Divisie | 17 | 2 | 1 | 0 | — | | 18 | 2 |
| MVV | Total | | 51 | 13 | 3 | 0 | — | | 54 | 13 |
| Career total | | | 355 | 97 | 18 | 7 | 11 | 2 | 384 | 106 |

== Honours ==
Individual

- Eerste Divisie Goal of the Season: 2021–22
