= Richard Sedláček =

Czech footballer (born 1999)

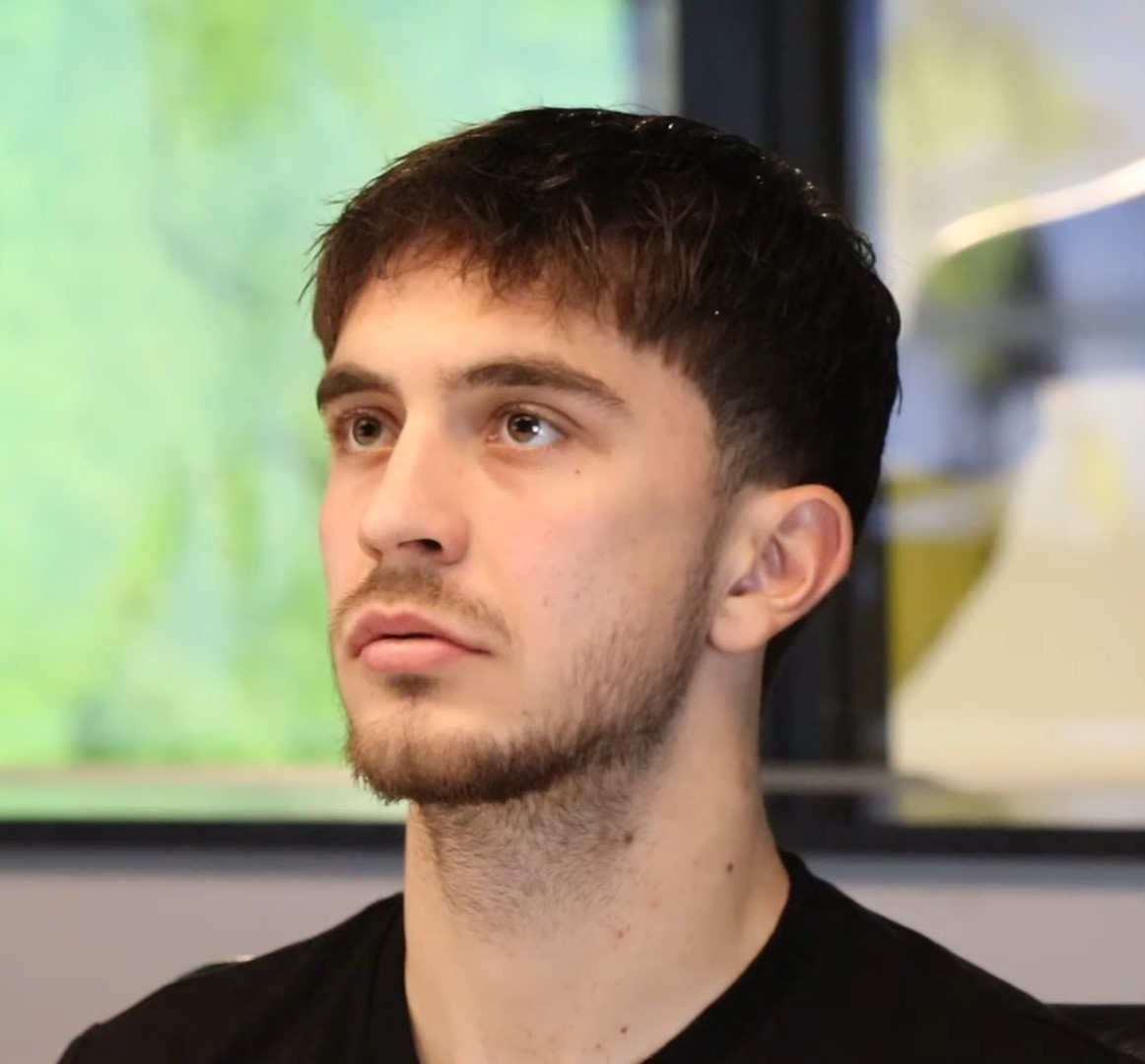
- Sedláček in 2023

Personal information
- Date of birth: 21 June 1999 (age 27)
- Place of birth: Rumburk, Czech Republic
- Height: 1.69 m (5 ft 7 in)
- Position: Midfielder

Team information
- Current team: Jablonec
- Number: 13

Youth career
- 2005–2008: FK Rumburk
- 2008–2010: FK Junior Děčín
- 2010: FK Rumburk
- 2010–2012: Teplice
- 2012–2018: Sparta Prague

Senior career*
Years	Team	Apps	(Gls)
2018–2022	Jong AZ	52	(6)
2022–2024	VVV-Venlo	65	(1)
2024–	Teplice B	11	(3)
2024–2025	Teplice	18	(1)
2025–	Jablonec	23	(0)

International career
2015–2016	Czech Republic U17	6	(3)
2017	Czech Republic U19	6	(3)
2019	Czech Republic U20	2	(1)
- * Club domestic league appearances and goals as of 27 May 2026

Richard Sedláček (born 21 June 1999) is a Czech professional footballer who plays as midfielder for Czech First League club Jablonec.

== Club career ==
=== AZ ===
Sedláček played in the Sparta Prague youth academy until 2018, where he moved to Dutch club AZ, initially joining the reserve team Jong AZ competing in the second-tier Eerste Divisie. He made his league debut for Jong AZ on 5 October 2018, replacing Tijjani Reijnders in the 73rd minute in a 2–2 home draw against Helmond Sport.

=== VVV-Venlo ===
On 31 January 2022, Sedláček signed a one-and-a-half-year contract with Eerste Divisie club VVV-Venlo, joining the club alongside Jong AZ teammate Sem Dirks. He made his debut on 4 February 2022, starting in a 5–0 away win over MVV in the Eerste Divisie. Exactly one month later, on 4 March, Sedláček was forced off due to an injury after ten minutes of play in the league game against Volendam; it was later confirmed how he would miss the remainder of the 2021–22 season, as he had torn his ankle ligament.

The following season, Sedláček was mainly a starter for VVV, making 34 total appearances in which he failed to score. On 5 January 2023, he had signed a new contract with the club, keeping him in Venlo until 2025.

On 24 November 2023, Sedláček scored his first competitive goal for VVV in a 2–1 league loss to Cambuur.

On 19 August 2024, Sedláček's contract with VVV was terminated by mutual consent.

=== Teplice ===
On 27 August 2024, Sedláček returned to his youth club Teplice. He initially featured for Teplice's reserve team in the third-tier Bohemian Football League before making his Czech First League debut on 21 September, coming on as a substitute for Lukáš Mareček in the 74th minute of a 3–2 defeat against Baník Ostrava. In stoppage time, he provided an assist for Teplice's second goal.

Sedláček established himself as a regular starter in early 2025 and scored his first goal for the club on 1 March in a 2–0 league victory over Pardubice. Ten days later, he scored again in the Czech Cup, helping Teplice to a 2–1 win against third-tier Hlučín.

=== Jablonec ===
On 8 September 2025, Sedláček signed a contract with Jablonec.

== Career statistics ==
As of match played 15 March 2025

Appearances and goals by club, season and competition
Club	Season	League			KNVB Cup		Other		Total	
Club	Season	Division	Apps	Goals	Apps	Goals	Apps	Goals	Apps	Goals
Jong AZ	2018–19	Eerste Divisie	10	0	—		—		10	0
Jong AZ	2019–20	Eerste Divisie	20	5	—		—		20	5
Jong AZ	2020–21	Eerste Divisie	3	1	—		—		3	1
Jong AZ	2021–22	Eerste Divisie	19	0	—		—		19	0
Jong AZ	Total		52	6	—		—		52	6
VVV-Venlo	2021–22	Eerste Divisie	4	0	0	0	—		4	0
VVV-Venlo	2022–23	Eerste Divisie	32	0	2	0	0	0	34	0
VVV-Venlo	2023–24	Eerste Divisie	29	1	1	0	—		30	1
VVV-Venlo	Total		65	1	3	0	0	0	68	1
Teplice B	2024–25	ČFL	11	3	—		—		11	3
Teplice	2024–25	Czech First League	13	1	2	1	—		15	2
Career total			141	11	5	1	0	0	146	12
