= Sem Dirks =

Dutch footballer (born 2001)

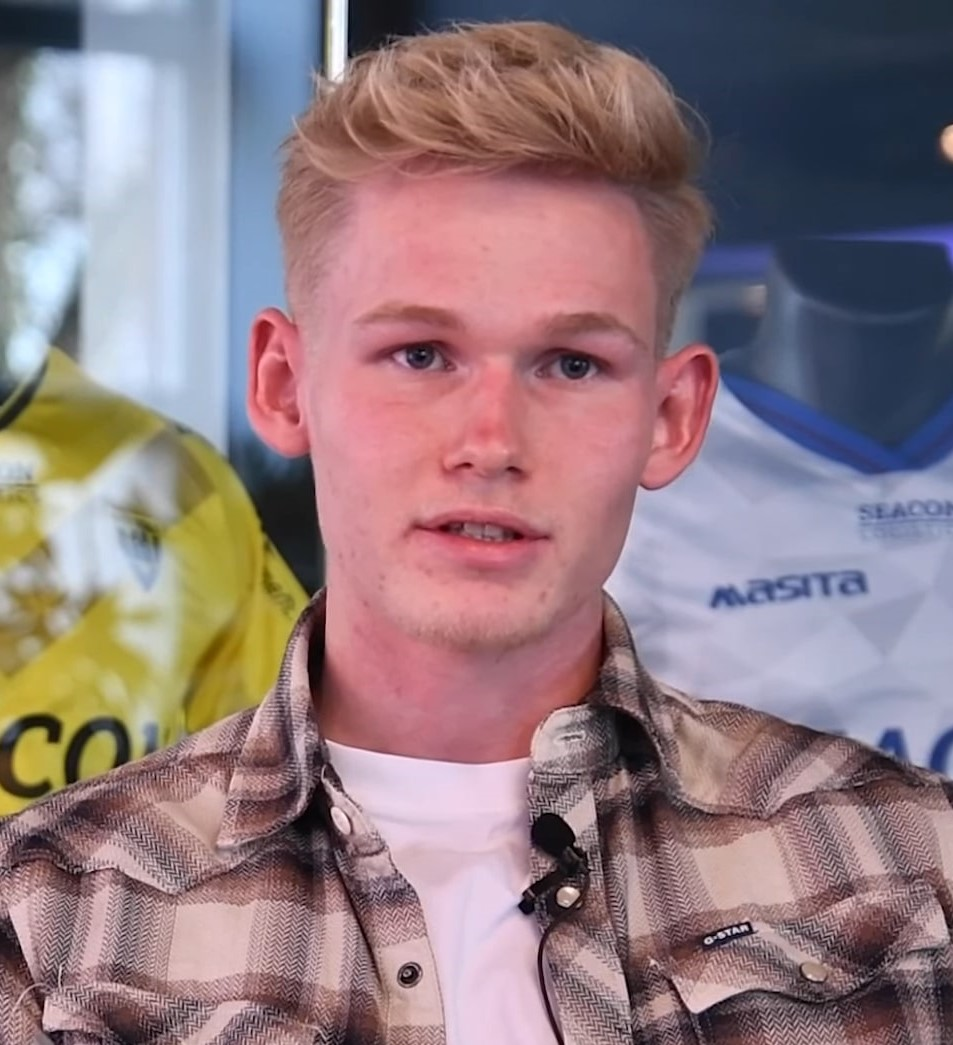
- Dirks in 2022

Personal information
- Date of birth: 14 March 2001 (age 25)
- Place of birth: Beverwijk, Netherlands
- Height: 1.81 m (5 ft 11 in)
- Position: Left-back

Team information
- Current team: Terrassa
- Number: 3

Youth career
- –2012: DEM
- 2012–2020: AZ

Senior career*
Years	Team	Apps	(Gls)
2020–2022	Jong AZ	19	(0)
2022	→ VVV-Venlo (loan)	10	(0)
2022–2024	VVV-Venlo	14	(0)
2024–2025	Telstar	16	(0)
2025–	Terrassa	18	(0)
- * Club domestic league appearances and goals as of 15 May 2026

Sem Dirks (born 14 March 2001) is a Dutch professional footballer who plays as a left-back for Spanish Segunda Federación – Group 2 club Terrassa.

== Club career ==
=== AZ ===
Dirks played youth football for DEM before joining the AZ youth academy in 2012. He progressed through various of AZ's youth teams before being promoted to the reserves in 2020, competing in the Dutch second-tier Eerste Divisie. Dirks made his professional debut with the team in a 6–1 league loss to NAC Breda on 29 August 2020, starting the match at left-back before being replaced by Tijs Velthuis in the 68th minute.

On 18 June 2021, Dirks signed his first professional contract with AZ; a one-year deal with an option for an additional year.

=== VVV-Venlo ===
On 31 January 2022, Dirks was loaned to VVV-Venlo, following teammate Richard Sedláček who had signed a permanent deal with the club. Dirks made his debut for the club as a starter on 4 February in a 5–0 away victory in the regional derby against MVV.

On 19 May, his deal was made permanent and he signed a two-year deal with an option for an additional year.

=== Telstar ===
On 8 August 2024, Dirks joined Telstar on an amateur basis. He made his debut for the club the following day, coming on as a substitute in the 76th minute for Mees Kaandorp in a 3–2 away win over Vitesse.

=== Terrassa ===
On 7 January 2025, Dirks signed with Terrassa in the Spanish fourth tier.

== Style of play ==
A left-footed defender, comfortable playing both centrally and at the left side, Dirks has described himself as a "technically skilled" and "tactically aware" defender, with good physicality and heading abilities.

== Career statistics ==
As of match played 4 May 2025

Appearances and goals by club, season and competition
Club	Season	League			KNVB Cup		Other		Total	
Club	Season	Division	Apps	Goals	Apps	Goals	Apps	Goals	Apps	Goals
Jong AZ	2020–21	Eerste Divisie	4	0	—		—		4	0
Jong AZ	2021–22	Eerste Divisie	15	0	—		—		15	0
Jong AZ	Total		19	0	—		—		19	0
VVV-Venlo (loan)	2021–22	Eerste Divisie	10	0	0	0	—		10	0
VVV-Venlo	2022–23	Eerste Divisie	14	0	1	0	2 (Note: Appearances in Eredivisie promotion/relegation playoffs)	0	17	0
VVV-Venlo	2023–24	Eerste Divisie	0	0	0	0	—		0	0
VVV-Venlo	Total		24	0	1	0	2	0	27	0
Telstar	2024–25	Eerste Divisie	16	0	2	0	—		18	0
Terrassa	2024–25	Segunda Federación	10	0	0	0	—		10	0
Career total			69	0	3	0	2	0	74	0
