= 2020–21 Heracles Almelo season =

Heracles Almelo
2020–21 season
- Chairman: Hans Bredewoud
- Manager: Frank Wormuth
- Stadium: Erve Asito
- Eredivisie: 9th
- KNVB Cup: Round of 16
- Top goalscorer: League: Rai Vloet (16); All: Rai Vloet (17)
Home colours	Away colours

The 2020–21 season was the 118th season in existence of Heracles Almelo and the club's 16th consecutive season in the top flight of Dutch football. In addition to the domestic league, Heracles Almelo participated in this season's edition of the KNVB Cup. The season covered the period from 1 July 2020 to 30 June 2021.

== Players ==
=== First-team squad ===
As of 1 February 2021

Note: Flags indicate national team as defined under FIFA eligibility rules; some limited exceptions apply. Players may hold more than one non-FIFA nationality.

No.	Pos.	Nation	Player
1	GK	GER	Janis Blaswich
2	DF	NED	Tim Breukers
3	DF	ITA	Giacomo Quagliata
4	DF	NED	Robin Pröpper (captain)
5	DF	GER	Marco Rente
6	MF	GER	Orestis Kiomourtzoglou
8	MF	NED	Teun Bijleveld
9	FW	TUR	Sinan Bakış
10	MF	NED	Rai Vloet
11	FW	NED	Silvester van der Water
13	DF	NED	Mats Knoester
14	MF	USA	Luca de la Torre
15	MF	BEL	Lucas Schoofs
16	GK	NED	Michael Brouwer
17	MF	HUN	Adrián Szőke

No.	Pos.	Nation	Player
18	MF	BEL	Ismail Azzaoui
19	DF	NED	Navajo Bakboord
20	MF	DEN	Kasper Lunding
21	GK	GER	Daniel Mesenhöler
22	DF	CRO	Mateo Les
23	DF	BEL	Noah Fadiga
24	DF	GER	Elias Oubella
25	FW	TUR	Ahmed Kutucu (on loan from Schalke 04)
26	GK	NED	Koen Bucker
27	MF	TUR	Melih Ibrahimoglu
28	MF	BEL	Elias Sierra
30	MF	BDI	Mohamed Amissi
31	MF	NED	Rohat Agca
34	DF	NED	Jeff Hardeveld
37	FW	NED	Delano Burgzorg

=== Out on loan ===
Note: Flags indicate national team as defined under FIFA eligibility rules; some limited exceptions apply. Players may hold more than one non-FIFA nationality.

No. / Pos. / Nation / Player; — / FW / CUW / Jeremy Cijntje (on loan to Waasland-Beveren)	No. / Pos. / Nation / Player

== Pre-season and friendlies ==
Win Draw Loss

1 August 2020 Friendly	FC Groningen (Netherlands)	1–0	(Netherlands) Heracles Almelo	Groningen, Netherlands
20:00 CEST (UTC+2)	Slor 47'	Report		Stadium: Euroborg; Referee: Danny Makkelie

9 August 2020 Friendly	Heracles Almelo (Netherlands)	0–1	(Netherlands) PEC Zwolle	Almelo, Netherlands
16:45 CEST (UTC+2)		Report	Kersten 38'	Stadium: Erve Asito; Attendance: 1,200; Referee: Bas Nijhuis

15 August 2020 Friendly	Heracles Almelo (Netherlands)	2–0	(Netherlands) Go Ahead Eagles	Almelo, Netherlands
13:00 CEST (UTC+2)	Van der Water 67'; Schoofs 76'	Report		Stadium: Erve Asito; Referee: Ingmar Oosterom

16 August 2020 Friendly	Heracles Almelo (Netherlands)	Cancelled	(Germany) Sportfreunde Lotte	Almelo, Netherlands
13:00 CEST (UTC+2)				Stadium: Erve Asito

19 August 2020 Friendly	FC Emmen (Netherlands)	0–2	(Netherlands) Heracles Almelo	Emmen, Netherlands
14:30 CEST (UTC+2)		Report	Knoester 30'; Burgzorg 32'	Stadium: De Oude Meerdijk; Referee: Serdar Gözübüyük

22 August 2020 Friendly	De Graafschap (Netherlands)	1–0	(Netherlands) Heracles Almelo	Doetinchem, Netherlands
14:30 CEST (UTC+2)	Seuntjens 14' (pen.)	Report		Stadium: De Vijverberg; Referee: Edwin van de Graaf

25 August 2020 Friendly	Heracles Almelo (Netherlands)	4–0	(Netherlands) Telstar	Almelo, Netherlands
19:00 CEST (UTC+2)	Szőke 6' (pen.); Pröpper 34'; Burgzorg 50' (pen.), 58'	Report		Stadium: Erve Asito

2 September 2020 Friendly	Heracles Almelo (Netherlands)	4–0	(Netherlands) Jong FC Utrecht	Almelo, Netherlands
13:00 CEST (UTC+2)	Amissi 4'; Bijleveld 16', 19'; Fadiga 59'	Report		Stadium: Erve Asito

5 September 2020 Friendly	Eintracht Braunschweig (Germany)	2–0	(Netherlands) Heracles Almelo	Lotte, Germany
14:30 CEST (UTC+2)	Nikolaou 32'; Schultz 64'	Report		Stadium: Stadion am Lotter Kreuz; Attendance: 0

== Competitions ==
=== Overview ===
Competition	First match	Last match	Starting round	Final position	Record							
Competition	First match	Last match	Starting round	Final position	Pld	W	D	L	GF	GA	GD	Win %
Eredivisie	13 September 2020	16 May 2021	Matchday 1	9th	34	12	8	14	42	53	−11	35.29
KNVB Cup	28 October 2020	20 January 2021	First round	Round of 16	2	1	0	1	5	3	+2	50.00
Total					36	13	8	15	47	56	−9	36.11

Last updated: 16 May 2021
Source: Soccerway

=== Eredivisie ===
==== League table ====
Pos	Team	Pld	W	D	L	GF	GA	GD	Pts	Qualification or relegation
7	Groningen	34	14	8	12	40	37	+3	50	Qualification for the European competition play-offs (Note: Winner of play-off will qualify to Europa Conference League second qualifying round.)
8	Sparta Rotterdam	34	13	8	13	49	48	+1	47	Qualification for the European competition play-offs
9	Heracles Almelo	34	12	8	14	42	53	−11	44	
10	Twente	34	10	11	13	48	50	−2	41	
11	Fortuna Sittard	34	12	5	17	50	58	−8	41	

Source: Eredivisie, Soccerway
Rules for classification: Season in progress: 1) Most points won; 2) Less points lost; 3) Goal difference; 4) Goals scored; 5) Alphabetical order; End of season: 1) Points; 2) Goal difference; 3) Goals scored; 4) Head-to-head points; 5) Head-to-head goal difference; 6) Head-to-head away goals scored; 7) Play-off if relevant for deciding champion, relegation or participating in a European league, otherwise by draw. 8) Penalty shoot-out (only after a play-off)

==== Results summary ====
Overall								Home						Away					
Pld	W	D	L	GF	GA	GD	Pts	W	D	L	GF	GA	GD	W	D	L	GF	GA	GD
34	12	8	14	42	53	−11	44	8	4	5	29	16	+13	4	4	9	13	37	−24

Last updated: 16 May 2021.
Source: Eredivisie

==== Results by round ====
Round	1	2	3	4	5	6	7	8	9	10	11	12	13	14	15	16	17	18	19	20	21	22	23	24	25	26	27	28	29	30	31	32	33	34
Ground	H	A	H	A	H	A	H	A	A	H	A	H	A	A	H	H	A	H	A	H	A	H	A	H	H	A	H	A	H	A	H	A	H	A
Result	W	L	D	L	L	D	W	L	L	L	D	L	W	W	L	W	L	W	D	W	W	L	L	D	W	W	D	L	W	L	W	D	D	L
Position	5	10	11	13	14	13	10	10	13	15	13	13	12	12	13	11	12	10	11	10	11	11	11	11	10	9	9	9	8	8	8	9	9	9

Updated to match(es) played on 16 May 2021. Source: Eredivisie
A = Away; H = Home; W = Win; D = Draw; L = Loss

==== Matches ====
The league fixtures were announced on 24 July 2020.

13 September 2020 1	Heracles Almelo	2–0	ADO Den Haag	Almelo
14:30 CEST (UTC+2)	Vloet 48'; Bijleveld (yellow card) 68'; Van der Water 70'	Report	Kemper (yellow card) 18' (yellow-red card) 72'; Bourard (yellow card) 25'	Stadium: Erve Asito; Attendance: 2,700; Referee: Sander van der Eijk

20 September 2020 2	Willem II	4–0	Heracles Almelo	Tilburg
14:30 CEST (UTC+2)	Köhlert (yellow card) 43'; Pavlidis 46', 84'; Sağlam 50'; Yeboah 52'	Report		Stadium: Koning Willem II Stadion; Attendance: 3,908; Referee: Jeroen Manschot

27 September 2020 3	Heracles Almelo	1–1	PSV	Almelo
14:30 CEST (UTC+2)	Hardeveld (yellow card) 28'; Vloet 31' (pen.); Bijleveld (yellow card) 42'; Kiomourtzoglou (yellow card) 76'; Pröpper (yellow card) 88'	Report	Max 51' (pen.); Rosario (yellow card) 73'; Bruma (yellow card) 78'	Stadium: Erve Asito; Attendance: 3,083; Referee: Jochem Kamphuis

3 October 2020 4	Vitesse	3–0	Heracles Almelo	Arnhem
16:30 CEST (UTC+2)	Openda 34'; Darfalou 37'; Tannane 63'	Report		Stadium: GelreDome; Attendance: 0 Referee: Martin van den Kerkhof

17 October 2020 5	Heracles Almelo	0–1	RKC Waalwijk	Almelo
18:45 CEST (UTC+2)		Report	Bakari 26'	Stadium: Erve Asito; Attendance: 0 Referee: Jannick van der Laan

25 October 2020 6	Sparta Rotterdam	1–1	Heracles Almelo	Rotterdam
14:30 CET (UTC+1)	Harroui 47'	Report	Vloet 75'	Stadium: Het Kasteel; Attendance: 0 Referee: Serdar Gözübüyük

1 November 2020 7	Heracles Almelo	4–1	FC Utrecht	Almelo
12:15 CET (UTC+1)	Vloet 2', 63', 71'; Szőke (yellow card) 26'; Van der Water 45+1'; Rente (yellow card) 61'	Report	Gustafson 62' (pen.); Ramselaar (yellow card) 65'	Stadium: Erve Asito; Attendance: 0 Referee: Dennis Higler

7 November 2020 8	VVV-Venlo	3–2	Heracles Almelo	Venlo
18:45 CET (UTC+1)	Post (yellow card) 31'; Van Crooij (yellow card) 37', (goal) 67'; Arias 51'; Giakoumakis 88'	Report	Van der Water 38'; Szőke (red card) 47'; Vloet 78'	Stadium: De Koel; Attendance: 0 Referee: Richard Martens

22 November 2020 9	Ajax	5–0	Heracles Almelo	Amsterdam
12:15 CET (UTC+1)	Traoré 6'; Neres 29'; Labyad 36', 77'; Tadić 57'	Report	Schoofs (yellow card) 8'; Vloet (yellow card) 39'; Bijleveld (yellow card) 72'	Stadium: Johan Cruyff Arena; Attendance: 0 Referee: Jeroen Manschot

29 November 2020 10	Heracles Almelo	1–2	AZ	Almelo
16:45 CET (UTC+1)	Bakış (yellow card) 69'; Schoofs 75'; Quagliata (yellow card) 86'	Report	Koopmeiners 41' (pen.); Boadu 44'; De Wit (yellow card) 66'	Stadium: Erve Asito; Attendance: 0 Referee: Pol van Boekel

6 December 2020 11	Feyenoord	0–0	Heracles Almelo	Rotterdam
12:15 CET (UTC+1)		Report	Knoester (yellow card) 29'; Schoofs (yellow card) 35'; Bakış (yellow card) 56' (yellow-red card) 66'; Breukers (yellow card) 90+2'	Stadium: De Kuip; Attendance: 0 Referee: Martin van den Kerkhof

11 December 2020 12	Heracles Almelo	1–2	Fortuna Sittard	Almelo
20:00 CET (UTC+1)	Burgzorg (yellow card) 57', (goal) 90+3'	Report	Rente 31' (o.g.); Cox (yellow card) 34'; Seuntjens (yellow card) 45+3'; Rota (yellow card) 52'; Polter 60'; Van Osch (yellow card) 76'	Stadium: Erve Asito; Attendance: 0 Referee: Erwin Blank

20 December 2020 13	SC Heerenveen	1–2	Heracles Almelo	Heerenveen
14:30 CET (UTC+1)	Veerman 57'	Report	Burgzorg 6'; Knoester 48'	Stadium: Abe Lenstra Stadion; Attendance: 0 Referee: Martin Pérez

23 December 2020 14	FC Groningen	0–1	Heracles Almelo	Groningen
20:00 CET (UTC+1)		Report	Szőke 78'	Stadium: Euroborg; Attendance: 0 Referee: Allard Lindhout

9 January 2021 15	Heracles Almelo	0–2	Vitesse	Almelo
20:00 CET (UTC+1)		Report	Bero 38', 83'	Stadium: Erve Asito; Attendance: 0 Referee: Danny Makkelie

12 January 2021 16	Heracles Almelo	4–0	FC Emmen	Almelo
21:00 CET (UTC+1)	Bakış 26', 44', 64'; Vloet 87'	Report	Araujo (yellow card) 28'; Bernadou (yellow card) 45+1'	Stadium: Erve Asito; Attendance: 0 Referee: Rob Dieperink

16 January 2021 17	FC Utrecht	2–0	Heracles Almelo	Utrecht
20:00 CET (UTC+1)	Van de Streek 31'; Van Overeem (yellow card) 34'; Dalmau 72'; St. Jago (yellow card) 89'	Report	Breukers (yellow card) 40'	Stadium: Stadion Galgenwaard; Attendance: 0 Referee: Ingmar Oostrom

23 January 2021 18	Heracles Almelo	1–0	SC Heerenveen	Almelo
21:00 CET (UTC+1)	Quagliata (yellow card) 71'; Burgzorg 89'	Report	Kaib (yellow card) 85'	Stadium: Erve Asito; Attendance: 0 Referee: Jochem Kamphuis

26 January 2021 19	PEC Zwolle	2–2	Heracles Almelo	Zwolle
18:45 CET (UTC+1)	Misidjan (yellow card) 15', (goal) 50'; Ghoochannejhad 73'	Report	Schoofs 1'; Pröpper (yellow card) 16'; Quagliata (yellow card) 24'; Burgzorg 45+2'	Stadium: MAC³PARK Stadion; Attendance: 0 Referee: Marc Nagtegaal

30 January 2021 20	Heracles Almelo	1–0	FC Groningen	Almelo
16:30 CET (UTC+1)	Burgzorg 24'	Report	Da Cruz (yellow card) 46'	Stadium: Erve Asito; Attendance: 0 Referee: Pol van Boekel

5 February 2021 21	Fortuna Sittard	0–1	Heracles Almelo	Sittard
20:00 CET (UTC+1)		Report	Vloet 38'	Stadium: Fortuna Sittard Stadion; Attendance: 0 Referee: Martin Pérez

13 February 2021 22	Heracles Almelo	0–2	Ajax	Almelo
18:45 CET (UTC+1)	Quagliata (yellow card) 84'	Report	Klaassen 14'; Haller (yellow card) 66', (goal) 79'	Stadium: Erve Asito; Attendance: 0 Referee: Kevin Blom

21 February 2021 23	RKC Waalwijk	3–0	Heracles Almelo	Waalwijk
14:30 CET (UTC+1)	John 11'; Daneels 23'; Van der Venne 75'	Report		Stadium: Mandemakers Stadion; Attendance: 0 Referee: Christiaan Bax

27 February 2021 24	Heracles Almelo	2–2	FC Twente	Almelo
21:00 CET (UTC+1)	Azzaoui 6'; Vloet 47'	Report	Menig 13'; Danilo 50'	Stadium: Erve Asito; Attendance: 0 Referee: Dennis Higler

7 March 2021 25	Heracles Almelo	2–1	PEC Zwolle	Almelo
14:30 CET (UTC+1)	Vloet 61'; De la Torre 90+2'	Report	Saymak 63'	Stadium: Erve Asito; Attendance: 0 Referee: Bas Nijhuis

13 March 2021 26	ADO Den Haag	1–2	Heracles Almelo	The Hague
18:45 CET (UTC+1)	Castillo (yellow card) 37'; Vejinović (yellow card) 58'; Fadiga 68' (o.g.); Van Ewijk (yellow card) 71'; Adekanye (yellow card) 75'; Mokhtar (yellow card) 90+3'; Kramer (yellow card) 90+3'	Report	Azzaoui (yellow card) 40'; Bakış 72'; Vloet 83'	Stadium: Cars Jeans Stadion; Attendance: 0 Referee: Richard Martens

21 March 2021 27	Heracles Almelo	1–1	Sparta Rotterdam	Almelo
16:45 CET (UTC+1)	Bakış (yellow card) 58'; Vloet 90+3'	Report	Thy 58'; Duarte (yellow card) 84'	Stadium: Erve Asito; Attendance: 0 Referee: Siemen Mulder

4 April 2021 28	PSV	3–0	Heracles Almelo	Eindhoven
14:30 CEST (UTC+2)	Malen 9'; Dumfries 21'; Zahavi (yellow card) 59'; Ihattaren 90+2'	Report	Quagliata (yellow card) 71'; Pröpper (yellow card) 79'	Stadium: Philips Stadion; Attendance: 0 Referee: Martin van den Kerkhof

10 April 2021 29	Heracles Almelo	4–0	Willem II	Almelo
18:45 CEST (UTC+2)	Bakış 6', 38'; Pröpper 46'; Vloet 77'	Report	Owusu (yellow card) 80'	Stadium: Erve Asito; Attendance: 0 Referee: Pol van Boekel

25 April 2021 30	FC Emmen	3–1	Heracles Almelo	Emmen
12:15 CEST (UTC+2)	De Leeuw 58' (pen.), 89', 90+1'; Verrips (yellow card) 82'	Report	De la Torre (yellow card) 36'; Vloet 82' (pen.)	Stadium: De Oude Meerdijk; Attendance: 987; Referee: Jochem Kamphuis

1 May 2021 31	Heracles Almelo	4–0	VVV-Venlo	Almelo
16:30 CEST (UTC+2)	Bakış 35', 55', 83' (pen.); Vloet 44'; Knoester (yellow card) 49'	Report	Swinkels (yellow card) 82'	Stadium: Erve Asito; Attendance: 0 Referee: Björn Kuipers

8 May 2021 32	FC Twente	1–1	Heracles Almelo	Enschede
16:30 CEST (UTC+2)	Smal (yellow card) 52'; Bosch (yellow card) 73'; Danilo 85'	Report	Knoester 70'; Burgzorg (yellow card) 79'	Stadium: De Grolsch Veste; Attendance: 0 Referee: Allard Lindhout

13 May 2021 33	Heracles Almelo	1–1	Feyenoord	Almelo
14:30 CEST (UTC+2)	Quagliata (yellow card) 27'; Bakış 68' (pen.); Pröpper (yellow card) 83'	Report	Kökçü 64'; Diemers (yellow card) 85'	Stadium: Erve Asito; Attendance: 0 Referee: Jeroen Manschot

16 May 2021 34	AZ	5–0	Heracles Almelo	Alkmaar
14:30 CEST (UTC+2)	Boadu 41', 74'; Karlsson 50', 57'; Leeuwin (yellow card) 80'; Wijndal (penalty missed) 87', 87'; Bizot (yellow card) 90'	Report	Fadiga (yellow card) 59'; Knoester (yellow card) 76'	Stadium: AFAS Stadion; Attendance: 0 Referee: Jochem Kamphuis

=== KNVB Cup ===
28 October 2020 First round	Heracles Almelo	3–0	SC Telstar	Almelo
19:45 CET (UTC+1)	Bakis 29' (pen.); Vloet 73'; Szőke 90+2'	Report		Stadium: Erve Asito; Attendance: 0 Referee: Clay Ruperti

20 January 2021 Round of 16	Feyenoord	3–2	Heracles Almelo	De Kuip
18:45 CET (UTC+1)	Sinisterra 45+2'; Linssen 53'; Geertruida 84'	Report	Burgzorg 33'; Szőke 90+2'	Stadium: Rotterdam; Attendance: 0 Referee: Jeroen Manschot
