= 2021–22 Heracles Almelo season =

Heracles Almelo
2021–22 season
- Chairman: René Neelissen
- Head coach: Frank Wormuth (until 16 May); René Kolmschot (interim, from 16 May)
- Stadium: Erve Asito
- Eredivisie: 16th
- Relegation play-offs: Relegation play-offs (relegated)
- KNVB Cup: Second round

The 2021–22 season was the 55th season in the existence of Heracles Almelo and the club's 24th consecutive season in the top flight of Dutch football. In addition to the domestic league, Heracles Almelo participated in this season's editions of the KNVB Cup.

== Players ==
=== First-team squad ===
As of 26 March 2022

Note: Flags indicate national team as defined under FIFA eligibility rules; some limited exceptions apply. Players may hold more than one non-FIFA nationality.

No.	Pos.	Nation	Player
1	GK	GER	Janis Blaswich (captain)
3	DF	ITA	Giacomo Quagliata
4	DF	GER	Sven Sonnenberg
5	DF	GER	Marco Rente
6	MF	GER	Orestis Kiomourtzoglou
7	FW	TUR	Bilal Başaçıkoğlu
8	MF	BEL	Elias Sierra
9	FW	TUR	Sinan Bakış
11	FW	DEN	Nikolai Laursen
12	DF	NED	Ruben Roosken
13	DF	NED	Mats Knoester (vice-captain)
14	MF	USA	Luca de la Torre
15	MF	BEL	Lucas Schoofs
16	FW	NED	Kaj Sierhuis (on loan from Reims)
17	MF	HUN	Adrián Szőke
18	MF	BEL	Ismail Azzaoui

No.	Pos.	Nation	Player
19	DF	NED	Navajo Bakboord
20	MF	DEN	Kasper Lunding
21	DF	NED	Justin Hoogma
22	DF	CRO	Mateo Leš
23	DF	BEL	Noah Fadiga
24	DF	GER	Elias Oubella
25	DF	GHA	Robin Polley
26	GK	NED	Koen Bucker
27	MF	TUR	Melih İbrahimoğlu
28	GK	NED	Robin Jalving
29	FW	SWE	Emil Hansson
30	MF	MAR	Anas Ouahim
31	MF	NED	Rohat Agca
32	MF	NED	Sem Scheperman
33	FW	SWE	Samuel Armenteros
34	DF	NED	Chiel Olde Keizer

=== Out on loan ===
Note: Flags indicate national team as defined under FIFA eligibility rules; some limited exceptions apply. Players may hold more than one non-FIFA nationality.

No.	Pos.	Nation	Player
—	GK	NED	Michael Brouwer (on loan to FC Emmen until 30 June 2022)
—	GK	NED	Alessandro Damen (on loan to ADO Den Haag until 30 June 2022)

No.	Pos.	Nation	Player
—	FW	CUW	Jeremy Cijntje (on loan to FC Den Bosch until 30 June 2022)
—	FW	NED	Delano Burgzorg (on loan to Mainz 05 until 30 June 2022)

== Pre-season and friendlies ==
Win Draw Loss Fixtures

2 July 2021 Friendly	Heracles Almelo (Netherlands)	1–2	(Netherlands) Sparta Rotterdam	Almelo, Netherlands
14:00 CEST (UTC+2)				Stadium: Erve Asito

10 July 2021 Friendly	Heracles Almelo (Netherlands)	Cancelled	(Netherlands) Go Ahead Eagles	Almelo, Netherlands
13:00 CEST (UTC+2)				Stadium: Erve Asito

15 July 2021 Friendly	Heracles Almelo (Netherlands)	2–1	(Germany) SV Rödinghausen	Almelo, Netherlands
13:00 CEST (UTC+2)				Stadium: Erve Asito

20 July 2021 Friendly	Telstar (Netherlands)	Cancelled	(Netherlands) Heracles Almelo	Netherlands
16:00 CEST (UTC+2)

21 July 2021 Friendly	Heracles Almelo (Netherlands)	1–2	(Greece) PAOK	Netherlands
14:00 CEST (UTC+2)	Vloet 17'		Oliveira 14', 33'

24 July 2021 Friendly	Heracles Almelo (Netherlands)	0–1	(Netherlands) N.E.C.	Netherlands
13:00 CEST (UTC+2)			Bruijn 27'

25 July 2021 Friendly	FC Emmen (Netherlands)	4–1	(Netherlands) Heracles Almelo	Netherlands
14:30 CEST (UTC+2)	Van Ooijen 28', 83'; Mendes 61', 70'		Azzaoui 72'

30 July 2021 Friendly	Heracles Almelo (Netherlands)	4–1	(Netherlands) RKC Waalwijk	Almelo, Netherlands
18:45 CEST (UTC+2)	Başaçıkoğlu 34'; Vloet 59'; Kiomourtzoglou 73'; Quagliata (red card) 90'; Fadiga 90+3'		Bakari 83'; Gaari (red card) 90'	Stadium: Erve Asito

31 July 2021 Friendly	Heracles Almelo (Netherlands)	2–2	(Netherlands) De Graafschap	Almelo, Netherlands
13:00 CEST (UTC+2)	Amissi 25'; Bakış 34'		Verbeek 33'; Konings 36'	Stadium: Erve Asito

4 August 2021 Friendly	Heracles Almelo (Netherlands)	7–0	(Netherlands) HSC '21	Almelo, Netherlands
19:00 CEST (UTC+2)				Stadium: Erve Asito

7 August 2021 Friendly	Heracles Almelo (Netherlands)	3–1	(Netherlands) PEC Zwolle	Germany
16:00 CEST (UTC+2)	Burgzorg 20'; Laursen 66'; Amissi 75'		Tedic 28'

1 September 2021 Friendly	Werder Bremen (Germany)	2–0	(Netherlands) Heracles Almelo	Bremen, Germany
16:00 CEST (UTC+2)	Schönfelder 22'; Nankishi 56'			Stadium: Weser-Stadion

27 January 2022 Friendly	SC Cambuur (Netherlands)	0–1	(Netherlands) Heracles Almelo	Netherlands
13:00 CET (UTC+1)			Laursen 59'

25 March 2022 Friendly	VfL Bochum (Germany)	2–0	(Netherlands) Heracles Almelo	Bochum, Germany
13:00 CET (UTC+1)	Löwen 47'; Bonga 65'			Stadium: Vonovia Ruhrstadion; Attendance: 0

== Competitions ==
=== Overall record ===
Competition	First match	Last match	Starting round	Final position	Record							
Competition	First match	Last match	Starting round	Final position	Pld	W	D	L	GF	GA	GD	Win %
Eredivisie	14 August 2021	15 May 2021	Matchday 1	16th	34	9	7	18	33	49	−16	26.47
Eredivisie relegation play-offs	18 May 2022	21 May 2022	Semi-finals	Semi-finals	2	0	0	2	1	6	−5	0.00
KNVB Cup	26 October 2021	15 December 2021	First round	Second round	2	1	0	1	4	5	−1	50.00
Total					38	10	7	21	38	60	−22	26.32

Source: Soccerway

=== Eredivisie ===
==== League table ====
Pos	Team	Pld	W	D	L	GF	GA	GD	Pts	Qualification or relegation
14	Sparta Rotterdam	34	8	11	15	30	48	−18	35	
15	Fortuna Sittard	34	10	5	19	36	67	−31	35	
16	Heracles Almelo (R)	34	9	7	18	33	49	−16	34	Qualification for the Relegation play-offs
17	Willem II (R)	34	9	6	19	32	57	−25	33	Relegation to Eerste Divisie
18	PEC Zwolle (R)	34	7	6	21	26	52	−26	27	Relegation to Eerste Divisie

Source: Eredivisie
Rules for classification: Season in progress: 1) Most points won; 2) Less points lost; 3) Goal difference; 4) Goals scored; 5) Alphabetical order; End of season: 1) Points; 2) Goal difference; 3) Goals scored; 4) Head-to-head points; 5) Head-to-head goal difference; 6) Head-to-head away goals scored; 7) Play-off if relevant for deciding champion, relegation or participating in a European league, otherwise by draw. 8) Penalty shoot-out (only after a play-off)
(R) Relegated

==== Results summary ====
Overall								Home						Away					
Pld	W	D	L	GF	GA	GD	Pts	W	D	L	GF	GA	GD	W	D	L	GF	GA	GD
34	9	7	18	33	49	−16	34	7	5	5	22	21	+1	2	2	13	11	28	−17

Source: Eredivisie

==== Results by round ====
Round	1	2	3	4	5	6
Ground	H	A	H	A	H	H
Result	L	D	L	L	W	W
Position						

Source: Eredivisie
A = Away; H = Home; W = Win; D = Draw; L = Loss

==== Matches ====
The league fixtures were announced on 11 June 2021.

14 August 2021 1	Heracles Almelo	0–2	PSV	Almelo
18:45 CEST (UTC+2)	Fadiga (yellow card) 26'; Quagliata (yellow card) 66'	Report	Mauro Júnior (yellow card) 30'; Bruma 40'; Madueke 64'; Ramalho (yellow card) 76'	Stadium: Erve Asito; Attendance: 8,053; Referee: Danny Makkelie

21 August 2021 2	Sparta Rotterdam	1–1	Heracles Almelo	Rotterdam
20:00 CEST (UTC+2)	Vriends 40'	Report	Burgzorg 77'	Stadium: Het Kasteel; Attendance: 7,000; Referee: Bas Nijhuis

29 August 2021 3	Heracles Almelo	0–1	N.E.C.	Almelo
14:30 CEST (UTC+2)	Bakış (yellow card) 27' (yellow-red card) 41'; De la Torre (yellow card) 76'; Fadiga (yellow card) 77'; Blaswich (yellow card) 77'; Knoester (yellow card) 86'	Report	Márquez (yellow card) 41'; Akman 50'; Okita (yellow card) 90+2'	Stadium: Erve Asito; Attendance: 8,053; Referee: Jochem Kamphuis

12 September 2021 4	Feyenoord	2–1	Heracles Almelo	Rotterdam
14:30 CEST (UTC+2)				Stadium: De Kuip

19 September 2021 5	Heracles Almelo	3–2	Alkmaar	Almelo
16:45 CEST (UTC+2)				Stadium: Erve Asito; Referee: Serdar Gözübüyük

26 September 2021 7	Heracles Almelo	1–0	RKC Waalwijk	Almelo
CEST (UTC+2)				Stadium: Erve Asito

2 October 2021 8	Heracles Almelo	3–2	Willem II	Almelo
CEST (UTC+2)				Stadium: Erve Asito

30 October 2021 11	Heracles Almelo	0–0	Ajax	Almelo
CEST (UTC+2)				Stadium: Erve Asito

20 November 2021 13	Heracles Almelo	3–1	Fortuna Sittard	Almelo
CEST (UTC+2)				Stadium: Erve Asito

4 December 2021 15	Heracles Almelo	0–1	Heerenveen	Almelo
CEST (UTC+2)				Stadium: Erve Asito

18 December 2021 17	Heracles Almelo	4–2	Groningen	Almelo
CEST (UTC+2)				Stadium: Erve Asito

22 December 2021 18	Heracles Almelo	1–1	Cambuur	Almelo
CEST (UTC+2)				Stadium: Erve Asito

23 January 2022 20	Heracles Almelo	1–1	Go Ahead Eagles	Almelo
CEST (UTC+2)				Stadium: Erve Asito

11 February 2022 22	Heracles Almelo	1–0	Utrecht	Almelo
CEST (UTC+2)				Stadium: Erve Asito

26 February 2022 24	Heracles Almelo	2–0	PEC Zwolle	Almelo
CEST (UTC+2)				Stadium: Erve Asito

13 March 2022 26	Heracles Almelo	0–0	Vitesse	Almelo
CEST (UTC+2)				Stadium: Erve Asito

10 April 2022 29	Heracles Almelo	1–4	Feyenoord	Almelo
CEST (UTC+2)				Stadium: Erve Asito

30 April 2022 31	Heracles Almelo	1–1	Twente	Almelo
CEST (UTC+2)				Stadium: Erve Asito

15 May 2022 34	Heracles Almelo	1–3	Sparta Rotterdam	Almelo
CEST (UTC+2)				Stadium: Erve Asito
