= Sinan (disambiguation) =

Sinan is a given name and surname.

Sinan may also refer to:

== Buildings, institutions and places ==
- Sinan, Iran, a village in North Khorasan Province, Iran
- Mosque Katip Sinan Qelebi, in Prizren, Kosovo
- Sinan Pasha Mosque (Damascus), an early Ottoman-era mosque in Damascus, Syria, located along Suq Sinaniyya Street
- Sinan Pasha Mosque (Istanbul), built by one Sinan for another
- Sinan Pasha Mosque (Kaçanik), Kosovo
- Sinan Pasha Mosque (Prizren), Kosovo
- Mimar Sinan Fine Arts University, Istanbul
- Sinan Erdem Dome, Istanbul
- Abu Sinan, local council in Israel
- Sinan, Yemen, village in San‘a’ Governorate
- Kalaat es Senam, town in Tunisia
- Sinan (crater), crater on Mercury (named after Mimar Sinan)
- Sinanjiang Dam in Yunnan, China

== Places ==
- Sinan (woreda), Ethiopia
- Ain Sinan, Qatar
- Sinan County, Guizhou (思南县), China
- Sinan County, South Jeolla (신안군 / 新安郡), South Korea
- Tell Sinan, Syria

== Other uses ==
- Hakan Karahan (born 1960), Turkish writer who uses pseudonym Sinan

== See also ==
- Sinan County (disambiguation)
- Sinan Pasha Mosque (disambiguation)
- Sinon, warrior in Greek mythology who was involved in the Trojan Wars
