= Sinan =

Sinan (Arabic: سنان sinān) is a name found in Arabic and Early Arabic, meaning spearhead. The name may also be related to the Ancient Greek name Sinon. It was predominantly used as a male given name.

== Etymology ==
The word is possibly stems from the Arabic verb سَنَّ sanna, which means to "grind, sharpen, to make a point or dot". Another older meaning probably refer to "age", the length of time that a person has lived or a thing has existed, or the old age. Also, another meaning refers to "make a law/ legislation about something".

The general meaning is "sharpened point/ nib of the spear or lance(t)" which could possibly have a symbolic connotation representing a pointed arch, some referring to the niche of a mihrab, since the mihrab represent the "point, direction" of prayer to the Ka'abah in Islam. In a hadith narrated by Abu Juhaifa in Sahih al-Bukhari, "Once Allah's Messenger went to Al-Batha' at noon, performed the ablution and offered a two rak'at Zuhr prayer and a two-rak'at 'Asr prayer while a spearheaded stick was planted before him and the passersby were passing in front of it".

In another tradition, the battle standard of Muhammad, known in Turkish as Sancak-ı Şerif ("Holy Standard"), was believed to have served as the curtain over the entrance of his wife Aisha's tent, the standard had been part of the turban of Buraydah ibn al-Khasib, an enemy who was ordered to attack Muhammad, but instead bowed to him, unwound his turban and affixed it to his spear, dedicating it and himself to Muhammad's service.

In an Islamic interpretation of dreams, denotes the emblem of a religious man or a scholar, then it means innovation.

The name has been mostly used in Ottoman times, generally used as a common Turkish baby name.

Notable people with the name Sinan include:

== Pre-19th century ==
- Sinān ibn al-Fatḥ, mathematician from Ḥarrān
- Sinan ibn Thabit (died 943), Sabian scholar and Abbasid court physician, father of Ibrahim ibn Sinan
- Atik Sinan (died 1471), "old Sinan", Ottoman architect
- Ibrahim ibn Sinan (908–946), mathematician and astronomer in Baghdad
- Khaled bin Sinan (520–588), pre-Islamic prophet
- Mimar Sinan (1489–1588), chief architect and civil engineer for three Ottoman sultans
- Rashid ad-Din Sinan (died 1193), known as "Old Man of the Mountain", one of the leaders of the Nizari Ismaili community in Syria

=== Ottoman officers ===
- Sinan Bey Boljanić (died 1582), Bosnian nobleman
- Sinan Pasha (Ottoman admiral) (died 1553), in full Sinanüddin Yusuf Pasha, Kapudan Pasha (Grand Admiral) of the Ottoman Navy
- Sinan Reis (died 1546?), Sephardic Jewish Barbary corsair and lieutenant to Hayreddin Barbarossa
- Cığalazade Yusuf Sinan Pasha (1545–1605), Ottoman statesman of Italian background
- Hadım Sinan Pasha (died 1517), Ottoman grand vizier
- Koca Sinan Pasha (1506–1596), Albanian born Grand Vizier, Ottoman military commander (pasha) and statesman

== Post-19th century ==
- Hakan Karahan (born 1960), Turkish writer who uses pseudonym Sinan

=== Given name ===
- Sinan Abdullah (born 1947), Iranian-American Mandaean dentist and community leader
- Sinan Akçıl (born 1981), Turkish pop composer and songwriter
- Sinan Akdag (born 1989), German ice hockey defenseman
- Sinan Akkuş (born 1971), Turkish-German actor, director, film producer and writer
- Sinan Al Shabibi (1941–2022), governor of the Central Bank of Iraq
- Sinan Alaağaç (1960–1985), Turkish footballer
- Sinan Albayrak (born 1973), Turkish TV and film actor
- Sinan Alimanović (born 1954), Bosnian musician
- Sinan Antoon (born 1967), Iraqi poet and novelist
- Sinan Ateş (1984–2022), Turkish historian, academic and politician
- Sinan Ayrancı (born 1990), Turkish-Swedish footballer
- Sinan Bakış (born 1994), Turkish footballer
- Sinan Bolat (born 1988), Turkish-Belgian footballer
- Sinan Bytyqi (born 1995), Albanian-Austrian footballer
- Sinan Çalışkanoğlu (born 1978), Turkish actor
- Sinan Çetin (born 1953), Turkish actor, film director, and producer
- Sinan Demircioğlu (born 1975), Turkish footballer
- Sinan Engin (born 1964), Turkish footballer
- Sinan Erdem (1927–2003), Turkish volleyball player and head of the Turkish National Olympic Committee
- Sinan Güler (born 1983), Turkish basketball player
- Sinan Gümüş (born 1994), Turkish-German footballer
- Sinan Hasani (1922–2010), Yugoslav politician
- Sinan Idrizi (born 1968), Albanian businessman
- Sinan Kaloğlu (born 1981), Turkish footballer
- Sinan Karweina (born 1999), German footballer
- Sinan Keskin (born 1994), Dutch-Turkish footballer
- Sinan Khadir (born 1991), Indian cricketer
- Sinan Kurt, multiple people
- Sinan Kurumuş (born 1994), Turkish footballer
- Sinan Medgyes (born 1993), Slovak footballer
- Sinan Oğan (born 1967), Turkish politician
- Sinan Ören (born 1987), Turkish footballer
- Sinan Osmanoğlu (born 1990), Turkish footballer
- Sinan Ozen (born 1964), popular Turkish musician and actor
- Sinan Özkan (born 1986), Turkish footballer
- Sinan Pasha Sijerčić (died 1806), Ottoman Pasha from the Bosnia Eyalet
- Sinan Ramović (born 1992), Bosnian footballer
- Sinan Sakić (1956–2018), Serbian folk singer
- Sinan Şamil Sam (1974–2015), Turkish-German boxer
- Sinan Sandal (born 1989), Turkish judoka
- Sinan Savaskan (born 1954), Turkish-British classical music composer
- Sinan Selen (born 1972), Turkish-German constitutional lawyer
- Sinan Sofuoğlu (1983–2008), Turkish motorcycle racer
- Sinan Cem Tanık (born 1980), Turkish volleyball player
- Sinan Tekerci (born 1993), Turkish footballer
- Sinan Turhan (born 1958), Turkish footballer
- Sinan Tuzcu (born 1977), Turkish actor
- Sinan Uzun (born 1990), Turkish footballer
- Sinan Zorlu (born 1995), Turkish badminton player

=== Surname ===
- Asif Sinan, Pakistani Indian classical and jazz musician
- Sun Sinan (born 1988), Chinese field hockey player

== See also ==
- Sinan (disambiguation)
- Synan
