= 2019–20 Heracles Almelo season =

Heracles Almelo
2019–20 season
- Manager: Frank Wormuth
- Stadium: Erve Asito
- Eredivisie: 8th
- KNVB Cup: Round of 16
- Average home league attendance: 10,307
Home colours	Away colours	Third colours

During the 2019–20 season, Heracles Almelo participated in the Eredivisie and the KNVB Cup. Due to the COVID-19 pandemic, the Eredivisie season was abandoned with Heracles Almelo in 8th place. They were knocked out in the round of 16 in the KNVB Cup, losing at home to SBV Vitesse.

== Competitions ==
=== Eredivisie ===
==== League table ====
Pos	Team	Pld	W	D	L	GF	GA	GD	Pts
6	FC Utrecht	25	12	5	8	50	34	+16	41
7	Vitesse	26	12	5	9	45	35	+10	41
8	Heracles Almelo	26	10	6	10	40	34	+6	36
9	FC Groningen	26	10	5	11	27	26	+1	35
10	Heerenveen	26	8	9	9	41	41	0	33

Source: eredivisie.nl
Rules for classification: Season in progress: 1) Most points won; 2) Less points lost; 3) Goal difference; 4) Goals scored; 5) Alphabetical order; End of season: 1) Points; 2) Goal difference; 3) Goals scored; 4) Head-to-head points; 5) Head-to-head goal difference; 6) Head-to-head away goals scored; 7) Play-off if relevant for deciding champion, relegation or participating in a European league, otherwise by draw. 8) Penalty shoot-out (only after a play-off)

=== KNVB Cup ===
30 October 2019 First round	Heracles Almelo	4–3	RKC Waalwijk	Almelo
18:30 CET	Dessers 7', 55'; Van der Water 35', 70'	Report	Maatsen 45'; Sow 53'; Leemans 62' (pen.)	Stadium: Erve Asito; Attendance: 6,856; Referee: Christiaan Bax

18 December 2019 Second round	Heracles Almelo	3–0	FC Dordrecht	Almelo
19:45 CET	Dessers 17'; Van der Water 50'; Breukers 86'	Report		Stadium: Erve Asito; Attendance: 6,381; Referee: Laurens Gerrets

22 January 2020 Round of 16	Heracles Almelo	0–2	Vitesse	Almelo
18:30 CET		Report	Tannane 11'; Matavž 60'	Stadium: Erve Asito; Attendance: 6,034; Referee: Jochen Kamphuis

== Player Transfers ==
=== Players In ===
Date	Position	Player	From	Type	Fee	Ref.
1 July 2019	MF	(Netherlands) Teun Bijleveld	(Netherlands) Ajax AFC	Transfer	Free	
1 July 2019	DF	(Netherlands) Navajo Bakboord	(Netherlands) Ajax AFC	Transfer	Free	
1 July 2019	MF	(Germany) Orestis Kiomourtzoglou	(Germany) SpVgg Unterhaching	Transfer	Undisclosed	
7 July 2019	FW	(Brazil) Mauro Júnior	(Netherlands) PSV Eindhoven	Loan	Season Loan	
7 July 2019	MF	(Serbia) Adrián Szőke	(Germany) FC Koln	Transfer	Free	
8 July 2019	FW	(Belgium) Cyriel Dessers	(Netherlands) FC Utrecht	Transfer	Undisclosed	

=== Players Out ===
Date	Position	Player	To	Type	Fee	Ref.
1 July 2019	FW	(Netherlands) Vincent Vermeij	(Germany) MSV Duisburg	Transfer	Free	
1 July 2019	MF	(Netherlands) Lerin Duarte	(Greece) Aris	Transfer	Free	
1 July 2019	DF	(Netherlands) Wout Droste	(Netherlands) Go Ahead Eagles	Transfer	Free	
1 July 2019	MF	(Netherlands) Brandley Kuwas	(United Arab Emirates) Al-Nasr	Transfer	Free	
1 July 2019	FW	(Netherlands) Zeki Erkilinç	(Netherlands) FC Dordrecht	Transfer	Free	
1 July 2019	DF	(Netherlands) Tim van de Berg	Released	Transfer	Free	
9 July 2019	FW	(Spain) Adrián Dalmau	(Netherlands) FC Utrecht	Transfer	Undisclosed	
9 July 2019	MF	(Netherlands) Yoell van Nieff	(Hungary) Puskás Akadémia	Transfer	Undisclosed	
2 Aug 2019	MF	(Sweden) Kristoffer Peterson	(Wales) Swansea City	Transfer	Undisclosed	
