= Mats Knoester =

Dutch footballer (born 1998)

Personal information
- Date of birth: 19 November 1998 (age 27)
- Place of birth: Alphen aan den Rijn, Netherlands
- Height: 1.88 m (6 ft 2 in)
- Position: Centre back

Team information
- Current team: Aberdeen
- Number: 5

Youth career
- 2005–2019: Feyenoord

Senior career*
Years	Team	Apps	(Gls)
2019–2022	Heracles Almelo	88	(2)
2022–2025	Ferencváros	29	(0)
2023–2024	→ AGF (loan)	14	(0)
2025–	Aberdeen	41	(0)

International career
2013	Netherlands U15	3	(0)
2013–2014	Netherlands U16	2	(0)
2014–2015	Netherlands U17	8	(0)
2015–2016	Netherlands U18	4	(1)
2016	Netherlands U19	1	(0)
- * Club domestic league appearances and goals as of 20 May 2026

Mats Knoester (born 19 November 1998) is a Dutch professional footballer who plays as a centre back for Scottish Premiership club Aberdeen.

== Club career ==
Knoester joined the Feyenoord youth academy and developed there for 14 years, before transferring to Heracles on 17 January 2019. Knoester made his professional debut with Heracles in a 1–0 Eredivisie win over Ajax on 9 February 2019.

On 26 May 2022, Knoester signed with Ferencváros in Hungary. On 5 May 2023, he won the 2022–23 Nemzeti Bajnokság I with Ferencváros, after Kecskemét lost 1–0 to Honvéd at the Bozsik Aréna on the 30th matchday.

On 1 September 2023, Knoester joined AGF in Denmark on a one-year loan deal with a purchase option.

On 3 February 2025, Knoester joined Scottish Premiership side Aberdeen after his contract expired with Ferencváros. In May, he won the Scottish Cup and was given the Man of the Match award, stating it was the best moment of his career to date. In June, he signed a long-term contract lasting until at least 2029.

== Career statistics ==
As of 18 June 2023

Club	Season	League			Cup		Continental		Other		Total	
Club	Season	Division	Apps	Goals	Apps	Goals	Apps	Goals	Apps	Goals	Apps	Goals
Heracles Almelo	2018–19	Eredivisie	5	0	—		—		—		5	0
Heracles Almelo	2019–20	Eredivisie	25	0	2	0	—		—		27	0
Heracles Almelo	2020–21	Eredivisie	27	2	1	0	—		—		28	2
Heracles Almelo	2021–22	Eredivisie	31	0	1	0	—		—		32	0
Heracles Almelo	Total		88	2	4	0	—		—		92	2
Ferencváros	2022–23	Nemzeti Bajnokság I	27	0	2	0	13	0	—		42	0
Career total			115	2	6	0	13	0	0	0	134	2

== Honours ==
Ferencváros

- Nemzeti Bajnokság I: 2022–23

Aberdeen

- Scottish Cup: 2024–25
