= Jamal al-Din al-Qasimi =

Muslim scholar (1866–1914)

Shaykh Jamal al-Din al-Qasimi
- جمال الدين القاسمي
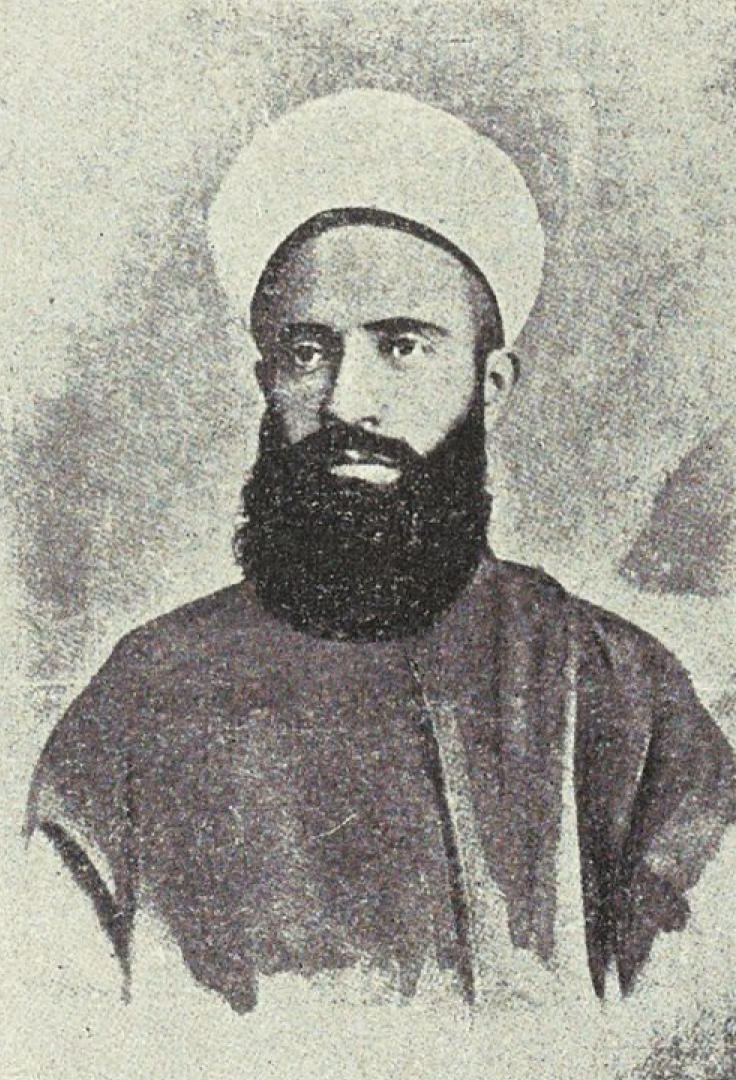

Personal life
- Born: 10 October 1866 Damascus, Ottoman Syria
- Died: 10 April 1914 (aged 47) Damascus, Ottoman Syria
- Parent: Muhammad Saeed al-Qasimi (father)

Religious life
- Religion: Islam
- Denomination: Sunni
- Jurisprudence: Shafi'i
- Creed: Athari
- Movement: Salafi

Muslim leader
- Students: Muhammad al-Bazm

Jamal al-Din bin al-Qasimi (Arabic: جمال الدين القاسمي; 1866 – 1914) was a Syrian Islamic scholar and one of the leading figures of the Salafi movement in late Ottoman Syria. His writings covered hadith, tafsir (Qur'anic exegesis), fiqh (jurisprudence) and ethics. He is regarded as part of the generation of Muslim reformers influenced by Muhammad Abduh and Rashid Rida.

== His era ==
=== Political situation ===
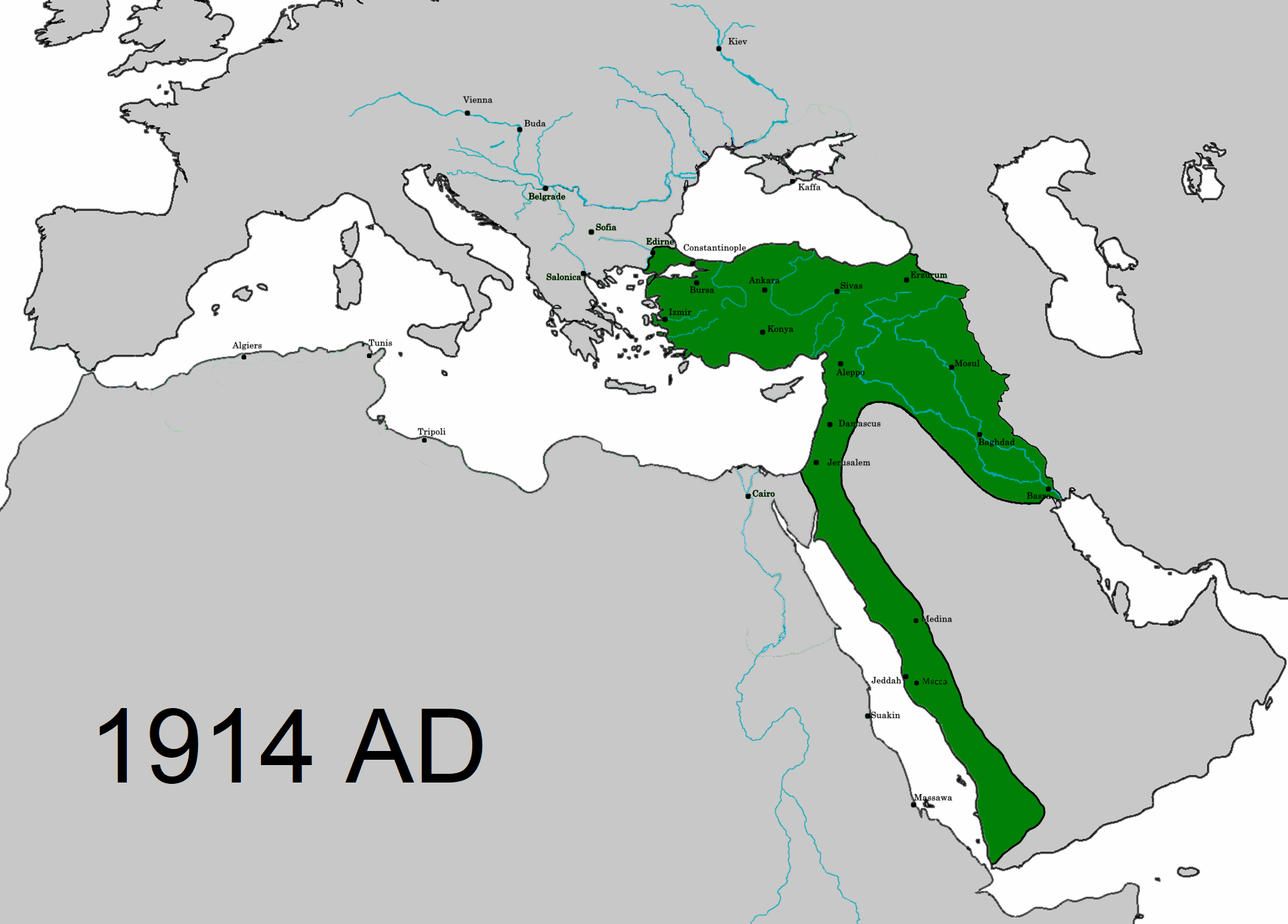
A map showing the influence of the Ottoman Empire in 1914, the same year al-Qasimi died

al-Qasimi lived in Damascus under Ottoman era between the 13th Hijri century to the end of the first third of the 14th Hijri century, During this period, the Ottoman state was at its most weakened condition, to the point that it was referred to as "The Sick Man" He witnessed the reign of four Ottoman sultans: Abdulaziz (1861–1876), Murad V (1876), Abdul Hamid II (1876–1909), and finally Mehmed V (1909–1918). During that time, the Ottoman Empire declared bankruptcy due to the excessive spending and extravagance of Abdulaziz. Numerous uprisings broke out in Romania, Serbia, Bosnia, Bulgaria, and Egypt. however, the Levant was not affected by these disturbances and remained calm, European colonial Powers begun to pressure the Ottomans and intervene in its internal affairs under the pretext of reform and modernization. Sultan Abdul Hamid II tried to fix these issues by paying off the state's debts and attempting to suppress the revolutions in the Balkans region, but, the reform efforts failed due to the outbreak of The Russo-Turkish War in 1877 in which the Ottomans were defeated, and it concluded with The Treaty of Berlin that resulted in the independence of several European States from The Ottoman Empire including Romania, Serbia, Montenegro, Bulgaria, Bosnia, Herzegovina, and Cyprus, European powers exploited the weakness of the Ottoman Empire and seized its territories like France who took Algeria and Tunisia, United Kingdom occupied Egypt, Aden, and Italy seized Tripolitania,

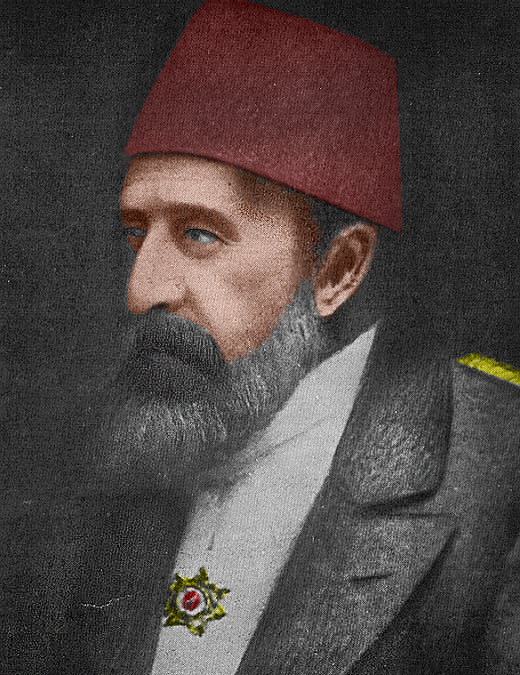
Portrait of Abdul Hamid II

== Early life and education ==
Al-Qasimi was born in Damascus in 1866. His father, Muhammad Saeed al-Qasimi, was a local religious teacher. He studied under prominent Damascene scholars including Muhammad Salim al-Attar, Ahmad al-Halawani al-Kabir, and Bakri al-Attar. He was trained primarily in the Shafi‘i school of Islamic law and adhered to the Athari creed.

== Career ==
Between 1890 and 1894, al-Qasimi worked as a state-appointed preacher and teacher in various Syrian towns. In 1895 he was briefly detained in what was known as the “Mujtahids Incident,” after accusations that he and colleagues were promoting unorthodox religious ideas; he was later cleared of all charges.

He maintained close correspondence with Egyptian reformers Muhammad Abduh and Rashid Rida, which contributed to the development of early Arab Salafi thought. Following the Young Turk Revolution and the rise of the Committee of Union and Progress, al-Qasimi and other reformist scholars faced increased restrictions from Ottoman authorities, who associated their movement with political dissent and Wahhabi influence.

In his later years, al-Qasimi focused on teaching and writing. He held lessons in tafsir and jurisprudence at the Sinan Pasha Mosque in Damascus, continuing the tradition of his father and grandfather.

== Thought and scholarship ==
Al-Qasimi’s work reflected the reformist ideas of his time, emphasizing ijtihad (independent reasoning) and opposition to taqlid (uncritical following of earlier scholars). He adopted the teachings of Ibn Taymiyya and admired Muhammad ibn Abd al-Wahhab for his role in opposing superstition and innovation in religion. At the same time, he maintained his grounding in the classical scholarly tradition and rejected sectarian polemics.

His major works address theology, hadith studies, Qur’anic interpretation, and social ethics. They were written in a systematic, encyclopedic style typical of late Ottoman scholars.

== Selected works ==
- Qawa‘id al-Tahdith min Funun Mustalah al-Hadith – Principles of Hadith terminology.
- Islah al-Masajid min al-Bida‘ wal-‘Awa’id – Reforming the Mosques from Innovations and Customs.
- Tafsir al-Qasimi (Mahasin al-Ta’wil) – a multi-volume Qur’anic commentary.
- Ta’thir al-Masham fi Mathir Dimashq al-Sham – Historical accounts of Damascus.
- Irshad al-Khalq ila ‘Amal bil-Birq – Treatise on social reform.

== Death ==
Al-Qasimi died in 1914 in Damascus from typhoid fever.

== Legacy ==
Al-Qasimi is regarded as one of the key forerunners of 20th-century Islamic reformism in the Levant. His students and writings influenced subsequent Syrian and Arab religious thought.
