= Janis Blaswich =

German footballer (born 1991)

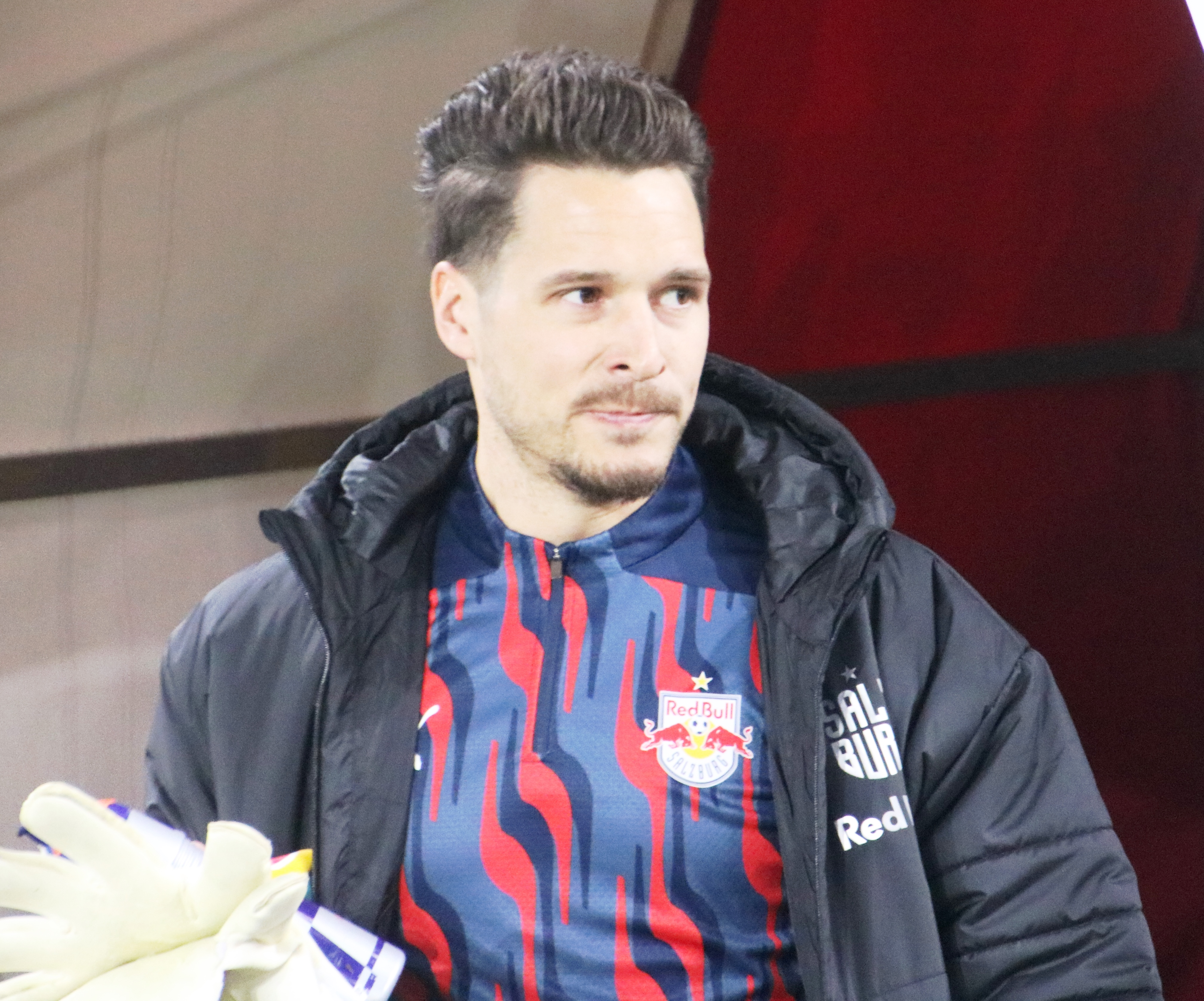
- Blaswich with Red Bull Salzburg in 2025

Personal information
- Full name: Janis Jonathan Blaswich
- Date of birth: 2 May 1991 (age 35)
- Place of birth: Willich, Germany
- Height: 1.93 m (6 ft 4 in)
- Position: Goalkeeper

Team information
- Current team: Bayer Leverkusen
- Number: 28

Youth career
- 1997–2006: VfR Mehrhoog
- 2006–2010: Borussia Mönchengladbach

Senior career*
Years	Team	Apps	(Gls)
2009–2018	Borussia Mönchengladbach II	127	(0)
2011–2018	Borussia Mönchengladbach	0	(0)
2015–2016	→ Dynamo Dresden (loan)	30	(0)
2017–2018	→ Hansa Rostock (loan)	34	(0)
2018–2022	Heracles Almelo	107	(0)
2022–2025	RB Leipzig	47	(0)
2024–2025	→ Red Bull Salzburg (loan)	11	(0)
2025–	Bayer Leverkusen	11	(0)
- * Club domestic league appearances and goals as of 25 April 2026

Janis Jonathan Blaswich (born 2 May 1991) is a German professional footballer who plays as a goalkeeper for Bundesliga club Bayer Leverkusen.

== Club career ==
=== Early career ===
Blaswich started his career at Borussia Mönchengladbach, where he was loaned out to Dynamo Dresden, and Hansa Rostock. He later joined Dutch club Heracles Almelo ahead of the 2018–19 season.

=== RB Leipzig ===
On 15 February 2022, Blaswich signed a contract with RB Leipzig, effective from 1 July 2022 to 30 June 2025. On 20 August, he made his debut for Leipzig in a 1–2 away loss against Union Berlin. On 5 October 2022, during a Champions League matchup against Celtic, Leipzig's longtime keeper Péter Gulácsi suffered a torn ACL rupture, which would force him to miss the rest of the season, in which Blaswich immediately replaced him in the 13 minutes of the first half, in a match which ended in a 3–1 victory. Three days later, he played a full 90-minute matchup as a replacement in a 1–1 away draw against Mainz 05.

He later managed to achieve his first titles at the club, by winning the DFB-Pokal and DFL-Supercup. On 1 September 2023, he extended his contract with RB Leipzig until 2026.

On 22 June 2024, Blaswich joined Austrian Bundesliga side Red Bull Salzburg on a season-long loan deal.

=== Bayer 04 Leverkusen ===
On 11 August 2025, Blaswich joined German side Bayer Leverkusen for a reported fee of €2 million with an additional €1 million worth of add-ons, signing a contract which ends on 30 June 2027.

== International career ==
In November 2023, Blaswich was called up for the Germany national team by coach Julian Nagelsmann, ahead of their friendly matches against Turkey and Austria.

== Career statistics ==
As of match played 28 October 2026

Appearances and goals by club, season and competition
Club	Season	League			National cup (Note: Includes DFB-Pokal, KNVB Cup, Austrian Cup)		Europe		Other		Total	
Club	Season	Division	Apps	Goals	Apps	Goals	Apps	Goals	Apps	Goals	Apps	Goals
Borussia Mönchengladbach II	2008–09	Regionalliga West	1	0	—		—		—		1	0
Borussia Mönchengladbach II	2009–10	Regionalliga West	9	0	—		—		—		9	0
Borussia Mönchengladbach II	2010–11	Regionalliga West	19	0	—		—		—		19	0
Borussia Mönchengladbach II	2011–12	Regionalliga West	35	0	—		—		—		35	0
Borussia Mönchengladbach II	2012–13	Regionalliga West	21	0	—		—		—		21	0
Borussia Mönchengladbach II	2013–14	Regionalliga West	32	0	—		—		—		32	0
Borussia Mönchengladbach II	2014–15	Regionalliga West	8	0	—		—		—		8	0
Borussia Mönchengladbach II	2015–16	3. Liga	2	0	—		—		—		2	0
Borussia Mönchengladbach II	Total		127	0	—		—		—		127	0
Borussia Mönchengladbach	2011–12	Bundesliga	0	0	0	0	—		—		0	0
Borussia Mönchengladbach	2012–13	Bundesliga	0	0	0	0	—		—		0	0
Borussia Mönchengladbach	2014–15	Bundesliga	0	0	0	0	0	0	—		0	0
Borussia Mönchengladbach	Total		0	0	0	0	0	0	—		0	0
Dynamo Dresden (loan)	2015–16	3. Liga	30	0	1	0	—		—		31	0
Hansa Rostock (loan)	2016–17	3. Liga	34	0	4	0	—		—		38	0
Heracles Almelo	2018–19	Eredivisie	33	0	0	0	—		2 (Note: Appearances in Eredivisie European play-offs)	0	35	0
Heracles Almelo	2019–20	Eredivisie	26	0	0	0	—		—		26	0
Heracles Almelo	2020–21	Eredivisie	26	0	1	0	—		—		27	0
Heracles Almelo	2021–22	Eredivisie	22	0	0	0	—		—		22	0
Heracles Almelo	Total		107	0	1	0	—		2	0	110	0
RB Leipzig	2022–23	Bundesliga	26	0	5	0	6 (Note: Appearances in UEFA Champions League)	0	—		37	0
RB Leipzig	2023–24	Bundesliga	21	0	0	0	5	0	1 (Note: Appearance in DFL-Supercup)	0	27	0
RB Leipzig	Total		47	0	5	0	11	0	1	0	64	0
Red Bull Salzburg (loan)	2024–25	Austrian Bundesliga	11	0	2	0	9	0	0	0	22	0
Bayer Leverkusen	2025–26	Bundesliga	11	0	1	0	6	0	—		18	0
Bayer Leverkusen	2026–27	Bundesliga	0	0	2	0	1 (Note: Appearances in UEFA Europa League)	0	—		2	0
Bayer Leverkusen	Total		11	0	3	0	7	0	—		21	0
Career total			367	0	16	2	27	0	3	0	413	0

== Honours ==
Dynamo Dresden

- 3. Liga: 2015–16

Hansa Rostock

- Mecklenburg-Vorpommern Cup: 2018

RB Leipzig

- DFB-Pokal: 2022–23
- DFL-Supercup: 2023
