= Synan =

Synan is a surname and given name. Notable people with the surname include:

- Edward A. Synan (1918–1997), American philosopher and theologian
- Edward John Synan (1820–1887), Irish politician
- H. Vinson Synan (1934–2020), American historian of Pentecostalism

As a given name, it may refer to:

- Synan Braddish (born 1958), Irish footballer

== See also ==
- Sinan, Arabic given name and surname
