= Noah Fadiga =

Belgian footballer (born 1999)

Personal information
- Date of birth: 3 December 1999 (age 26)
- Place of birth: Bruges, Belgium
- Height: 1.80 m (5 ft 11 in)
- Position: Right-back

Team information
- Current team: Aris
- Number: 27

Senior career*
Years	Team	Apps	(Gls)
2019–2020	Club Brugge	0	(0)
2019–2020	→ Volendam (loan)	24	(1)
2020–2022	Heracles	48	(1)
2022–2023	Brest	21	(1)
2023–2025	Gent	37	(5)
2025–	Aris	29	(0)
- * Club domestic league appearances and goals as of 19 September 2026

Noah Fadiga (born 3 December 1999) is a professional footballer who plays as a right-back for Greek Super League club Aris. Born in Belgium, he represents Senegal internationally.

== Club career ==
A youth product of Club Brugge, Fadiga joined Volendam on loan for the 2019–20 season. He made his professional debut with Volendam in a 1–1 Eerste Divisie tie with Helmond Sport on 9 August 2020.

Fadiga signed with Heracles Almelo in the Eredivisie on 19 July 2020.

In the summer of 2023, Fadiga experienced heart irregularities and was not allowed to continue playing in France by the French Football Federation due to their "zero tolerance" policy in that respect, even though he received a clean bill of health by cardiologists. As a free agent, on 8 August 2023 he signed a three-year contract with Gent in Belgium, his father played for the club 15 years prior.

Fadiga had a mini defibrulator installed after collapsing during a break in play in Gent's game against Standard Liege on 10 November 2024. Fadiga had just been involved in an aerial collision. A heart rhythm disorder was diagnosed while detained in hospital.

On the 10th June 2025 he signed for Aris for a fee of 1.5 million euros agreeing a three-year deal

== International career ==
In March 2023, Fadiga was called up to the Senegal national team for Africa Cup of Nations qualifiers against Mozambique, but remained on the bench.

== Personal life ==
Fadiga is the son of the retired Senegal international footballer Khalilou Fadiga, while his mother is Belgian.

== Career statistics ==
As of match played 11 May 2025

Appearances and goals by club, season and competition
Club	Season	League			National cup (Note: Includes Belgian Cup, KNVB Cup)		Europe		Other		Total	
Club	Season	Division	Apps	Goals	Apps	Goals	Apps	Goals	Apps	Goals	Apps	Goals
Club Brugge	2018–19	Belgian Pro League	0	0	0	0	0	0	0	0	0	0
Volendam (loan)	2019–20	Eerste Divisie	24	1	1	0	—		—		25	1
Heracles	2020–21	Eredivisie	15	0	1	0	—		—		16	0
Heracles	2021–22	Eredivisie	33	1	1	0	—		2 (Note: Appearances in European play-offs)	0	36	1
Heracles	Total		48	1	2	0	—		2	0	52	1
Brest	2022–23	Ligue 1	21	1	1	0	—		—		22	1
Gent	2023–24	Belgian Pro League	17	0	2	0	8 (Note: Appearances in UEFA Conference League)	0	—		27	0
Gent	2024–25	Belgian Pro League	20	5	0	0	9	1	—		29	5
Gent	Total		37	5	2	0	17	1	—		56	6
Career total			130	8	6	0	17	1	2	0	155	8
