= Sinan Pasha Mosque =

Sinan Pasha Mosque may refer to:

- Sinan Pasha Mosque (Damascus) in Damascus, Syria
- Sinan Pasha Mosque (Istanbul) in Istanbul, Turkey
- Sinan Pasha Mosque (Prizren) in Prizren, Kosovo
- Sinan Pasha Mosque (Kaçanik) in Kaçanik, Kosovo
- Sinan Pasha Mosque (Bulaq) in Bulaq, Cairo, Egypt
