= Luca de la Torre =

American soccer player (born 1998)

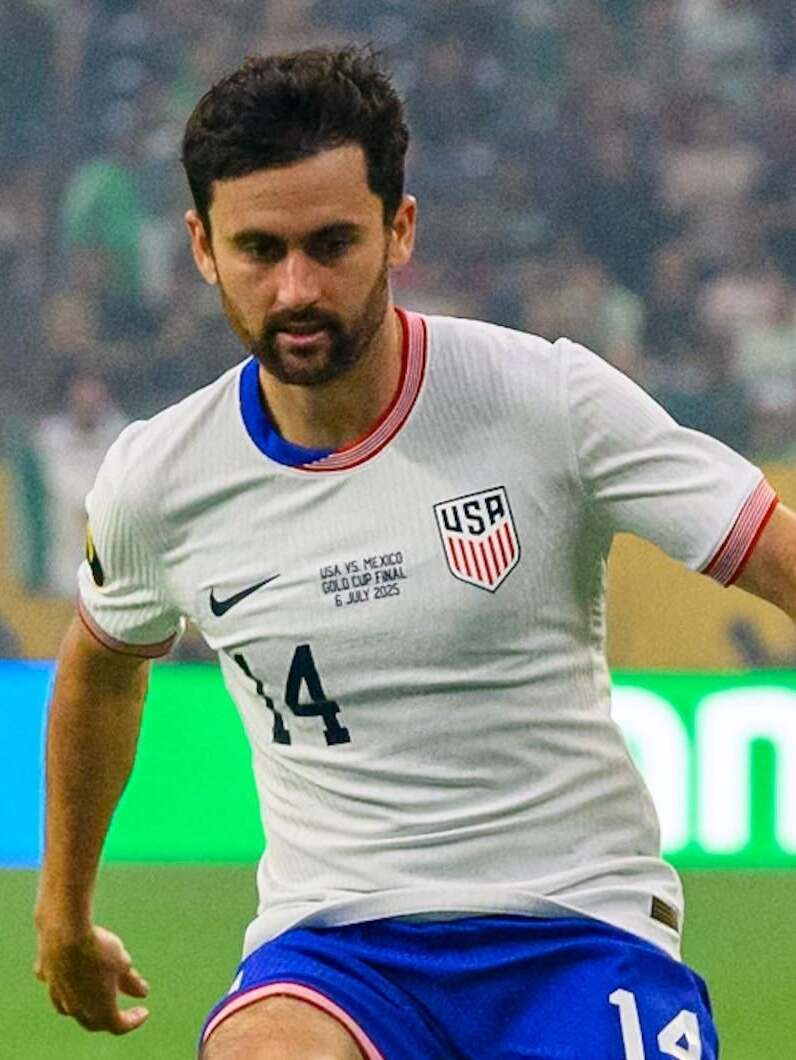
- De la Torre playing for the United States at the 2025 CONCACAF Gold Cup

Personal information
- Full name: Lucas Daniel de la Torre
- Date of birth: May 23, 1998 (age 28)
- Place of birth: San Diego, California, United States
- Height: 5 ft 10 in (1.78 m)
- Position: Midfielder

Team information
- Current team: Charlotte FC
- Number: 17

Youth career
- 2011–2012: Nomads
- 2012–2013: San Diego Surf
- 2013–2016: Fulham

Senior career*
Years	Team	Apps	(Gls)
2016–2020	Fulham	7	(0)
2020–2022	Heracles Almelo	64	(2)
2022–2025	Celta Vigo	60	(1)
2025	→ San Diego FC (loan)	30	(5)
2026–	Charlotte FC	30	(0)

International career^{‡}
2013–2015	United States U17	28	(2)
2016–2017	United States U20	15	(2)
2018–	United States	32	(1)
Medal record
Men's soccer
Representing United States
CONCACAF Gold Cup
Runner-up	2025 Canada–United States
CONCACAF Nations League
Winner	2023 United States
CONCACAF U-20 Championship
Winner	2017 Costa Rica
- * Club domestic league appearances and goals as of November 15, 2026 ‡ National team caps and goals as of September 9, 2025

Lucas Daniel de la Torre (born May 23, 1998) is an American professional soccer player who plays as a midfielder for Major League Soccer side Charlotte FC and the United States national team.

Having begun his professional career with Fulham in the EFL Championship, he later played for Heracles in the Eredivisie and Celta Vigo in La Liga. A full international for the United States since 2018, he was selected for the 2022 FIFA World Cup.

== Club career ==
=== Early career ===
De la Torre was born and raised in San Diego, California, and began playing soccer at Nomads and San Diego Surf, before moving to England to play with Fulham in 2013. De la Torre made his debut for Fulham on August 9, 2016, in the EFL Cup first round against Leyton Orient, starting the match and played 88 minutes at Brisbane Road as Fulham won 3–2. His first league appearance was a Championship match against Bolton Wanderers on October 28, 2017, as a last-minute substitute for Tomáš Kalas in a 1–1 home tie.

He scored his only goal for Fulham in an EFL Cup tie against Millwall on September 25, 2018.

=== Heracles ===
On August 6, 2020, de la Torre signed a two-year deal with Eredivisie side Heracles Almelo. He provided an assist in his Eredivisie debut on September 13, 2020, in a 2–0 win over ADO Den Haag. He was named to the Eredivisie Team of the Month for March 2021, having scored his first goal on March 7 as a late winner in a 2–1 home victory over PEC Zwolle. He was again named to the Eredivisie Team of the Month for January 2022.

=== Celta de Vigo ===
On July 7, 2022, de la Torre signed a four-year deal with Celta de Vigo of La Liga. He was the second player of American nationality to play for the club, after Italy international Giuseppe Rossi. He made his debut on August 20 in a 4–1 home loss to Real Madrid, playing the final three minutes in place of Renato Tapia.

Having only made brief substitute appearances under manager Eduardo Coudet, de la Torre played a larger role in the team after Carlos Carvalhal arrived. On December 22, he came off the bench away to Gernika in the second round of the Copa del Rey and scored his first goal within ten minutes to conclude a 3–0 victory. In the next round on January 3, 2023, he made his first start, though the team lost 3–1 at fellow top-flight team Espanyol in extra time.

He scored his first La Liga goal, following an assist one minute earlier, against Osasuna on February 4, 2024.

=== San Diego FC ===
On January 21, 2025, de la Torre signed with San Diego FC through the 2025 MLS season, on loan from Celta de Vigo with an option to purchase. de la Torre made 37 appearances with San Diego FC and had five goals; however, midway through the season he lost his starting position, and his purchase option was ultimately declined by San Diego.

=== Charlotte FC ===
On December 30, 2025, de la Torre signed with Charlotte FC from Celta de Vigo. The current contract runs through June 30, 2029 with an option to extend his contract for the 2029-30 season. To complete the move, Charlotte FC first had to acquire the First Right of Refusal from San Diego FC for $50,000 in 2026 General Allocation Money (GAM).

== International career ==
=== Youth ===
De la Torre was part of the United States under-17 team for the 2015 CONCACAF U-17 Championship and 2015 FIFA U-17 World Cup.

He was also part of the United States under-20 team that won the 2017 CONCACAF U-20 Championship, scoring the game-winner in a 4–1 group stage win against Haiti and netting a penalty kick during the penalty shootout in the final against Honduras. He was also a member of the United States squad that reached the 2017 FIFA U-20 World Cup quarterfinals, scoring a goal in a group stage draw against Ecuador and assisting on both Josh Sargent's game-winner in a group stage match against Senegal as well as Lagos Kunga's goal in a 6–0 Round of 16 win over New Zealand.

=== Senior ===
On June 2, 2018, de la Torre made his senior team debut for the United States, coming on as a substitute in a friendly against Republic of Ireland. On February 2, 2022, he made his first start for the United States against Honduras in a 3–0 victory in World Cup Qualifying.

De la Torre recovered from a muscular injury suffered in October 2022 in time to be chosen for the World Cup in Qatar the following month. He did not feature in any games as the United States reached the last 16.

de la Torre scored his first goal for the senior squad in a 1–2 friendly loss to Canada on September 7, 2024.

== Personal life ==
Both of de la Torre's parents are scientists at research institutes in the San Diego area. His father is Spanish, which allowed him to receive a Spanish passport and leave the U.S. at 15 years old. He did not learn Spanish until he arrived at Celta Vigo, but is now comfortable giving interviews and communicating with his teammates.

Dubbed "El Pulpeto" by the club, de la Torre has a superstition to eat Galician octopus ("pulpo") after every Celta Vigo victory.

== Career statistics ==
=== Club ===
As of match played November 7, 2026

Appearances and goals by club, season and competition
Club	Season	League			National cup (Note: Includes FA Cup, KNVB Cup, Copa del Rey, U.S. Open Cup)		League cup (Note: Includes EFL Cup)		Other		Total	
Club	Season	Division	Apps	Goals	Apps	Goals	Apps	Goals	Apps	Goals	Apps	Goals
Fulham	2016–17	Championship	0	0	0	0	3	0	—		3	0
Fulham	2017–18	Championship	5	0	0	0	0	0	—		5	0
Fulham	2018–19	Premier League	0	0	0	0	2	1	—		2	1
Fulham	2019–20	Championship	2	0	1	0	1	0	—		4	0
Fulham	Total		7	0	1	0	6	1	—		14	1
Heracles Almelo	2020–21	Eredivisie	32	1	1	0	—		—		33	1
Heracles Almelo	2021–22	Eredivisie	32	1	2	0	—		—		34	1
Heracles Almelo	Total		64	2	3	0	—		—		67	2
Celta	2022–23	La Liga	28	0	2	1	—		—		30	1
Celta	2023–24	La Liga	31	1	4	2	—		—		35	3
Celta	2024–25	La Liga	1	0	1	0	—		—		2	0
Celta	Total		60	1	7	3	—		—		67	4
San Diego FC (loan)	2025	MLS	30	5	—		—		7 (Note: Three appearances in Leagues Cup, four appearances in MLS Cup playoffs)	0	37	5
Charlotte FC	2026	MLS	30	0	2	0	—		3 (Note: Appearances in Leagues Cup)	0	35	0
Career total			190	8	13	3	6	1	10	0	219	12

=== International ===
As of match played September 9, 2025

Appearances and goals by national team and year
National team	Year	Apps	Goals
United States	2018	1	0
United States	2021	3	0
United States	2022	8	0
United States	2023	8	0
United States	2024	4	1
United States	2025	8	0
Total		32	1

United States score listed first, score column indicates score after each de la Torre goal.

List of international goals scored by Luca de la Torre
No.	Date	Venue	Cap	Opponent	Score	Result	Competition	Ref.
1	7 September 2024	Children's Mercy Park, Kansas City, United States	23	Canada	1–2	1–2	Friendly	

== Honors ==
United States U20

- CONCACAF U-20 Championship: 2017

United States

- CONCACAF Nations League: 2022–23

Individual

- Eredivisie Team of the Month: January 2022
