= Delano Burgzorg =

Dutch footballer (born 1998)

Personal information
- Full name: Delano Dwayne Burgzorg
- Date of birth: 7 November 1998 (age 28)
- Place of birth: Amsterdam, Netherlands
- Height: 1.86 m (6 ft 1 in)
- Position: Forward

Team information
- Current team: Preston North End (on loan from Middlesbrough)
- Number: 37

Senior career*
Years	Team	Apps	(Gls)
2016–2018	Jong De Graafschap	35	(12)
2018–2019	De Graafschap	32	(5)
2019–2020	Spezia	8	(0)
2020	→ Heracles (loan)	5	(1)
2020–2022	Heracles	49	(9)
2022	→ Mainz 05 (loan)	3	(1)
2022–2024	Mainz 05	13	(0)
2022	Mainz 05 II	1	(2)
2023–2024	→ Huddersfield Town (loan)	33	(7)
2024–	Middlesbrough	67	(7)
2026	→ Bristol City (loan)	15	(1)
2026–	→ Preston North End (loan)	2	(0)
- * Club domestic league appearances and goals as of 02:48, 25 August 2026 (UTC)

Delano Dwayne Burgzorg (born 7 November 1998) is a Dutch professional footballer who plays as a forward for EFL Championship club Preston North End on loan from EFL Championship club Middlesbrough.

== Club career ==
On 31 January 2020, Burgzorg was loaned to Heracles with an option to buy.

On 29 January 2022, Burgzorg joined Mainz 05 on loan. On 17 May 2022, Mainz exercised their option to make the transfer permanent and Burgzorg signed a three-year contract with the club.

On 17 August 2023, Burgzorg moved to English Championship club Huddersfield Town on a season-long loan.

On 14 June 2024, Burgzorg signed for Championship club Middlesbrough for an undisclosed fee, signing a four-year deal. He scored his first goal for the club on 14 August 2024 in an EFL Cup tie against Leeds United. Three months later, he would score his first two Championship goals for the club in a 5–1 win over Luton Town.

On 29 January 2026, Burgzorg signed for Bristol City on loan until the end of the season.

== Personal life ==
Born in the Netherlands, Burgzorg is of Surinamese descent and could represent either country.

== Career statistics ==
As of 22 August 2026

Appearances and goals by club, season and competition
Club	Season	League			National cup (Note: Includes KNVB Cup, Coppa Italia, DFB-Pokal, FA Cup)		Europe		Other		Total	
Club	Season	Division	Apps	Goals	Apps	Goals	Apps	Goals	Apps	Goals	Apps	Goals
Jong De Graafschap	2016–17	Derde Divisie	8	6	—		—		—		8	6
Jong De Graafschap	2017–18	Derde Divisie	27	6	—		—		—		27	6
Jong De Graafschap	Total		35	12	0	0	0	0	0	0	35	12
De Graafschap	2017–18	Eerste Divisie	6	0	0	0	—		0	0	6	0
De Graafschap	2018–19	Eredivisie	26	5	1	0	—		3 (Note: Appearances in the 2019 Eredivisie relegation play-offs)	0	30	5
De Graafschap	Total		32	5	1	0	0	0	3	0	36	5
Spezia	2019–20	Serie B	8	0	2	1	—		0	0	10	1
Heracles (loan)	2019–20	Eredivisie	5	1	0	0	—		0	0	5	1
Heracles	2020–21	Eredivisie	32	5	2	1	—		0	0	34	6
Heracles	2021–22	Eredivisie	17	4	1	0	—		0	0	18	4
Heracles	Total		54	10	3	1	0	0	0	0	57	11
Mainz 05 (loan)	2021–22	Bundesliga	3	1	0	0	—		0	0	3	1
Mainz 05 II	2022–23	Regionalliga	1	2	0	0	—		0	0	1	2
Mainz 05	2022–23	Bundesliga	13	0	1	1	—		0	0	14	1
Mainz 05	2023–24	Bundesliga	0	0	0	0	—		0	0	0	0
Mainz 05	Total		16	1	1	1	0	0	0	0	17	2
Huddersfield Town (loan)	2023–24	Championship	33	7	0	0	—		0	0	33	7
Middlesbrough	2024–25	Championship	42	5	1	0	—		1 (Note: Appearances in EFL Cup)	1	44	6
Middlesbrough	2025–26	Championship	25	2	1	0	—		1	0	27	2
Middlesbrough	Total		67	7	2	0	—		2	1	71	8
Bristol City (loan)	2025–26	Championship	15	1	1	0	—		—		16	1
Preston North End (loan)	2026–27	Championship	2	0	0	0	—		1	0	3	0
Career total			263	45	10	3	0	0	6	1	279	49
