= Sinan Kurt =

Sinan Kurt may refer to:

- Sinan Kurt (footballer, born 1995), German football midfielder for Adana Demirspor
- Sinan Kurt (footballer, born 1996), German football winger
