= Teun Bijleveld =

Dutch footballer (born 1998)

Personal information
- Date of birth: 27 May 1998 (age 28)
- Place of birth: Amstelveen, Netherlands
- Height: 1.76 m (5 ft 9 in)
- Positions: Left-back; midfielder

Team information
- Current team: Almere City
- Number: 5

Youth career
- –2009: SV Ouderkerk
- 2009–2017: AZ Alkmaar

Senior career*
Years	Team	Apps	(Gls)
2017	Jong AZ	5	(0)
2017–2019	Jong Ajax	55	(4)
2019–2021	Heracles Almelo	35	(0)
2021–2022	Emmen	12	(0)
2022–2024	Roda JC	55	(2)
2024–2025	Triestina	17	(1)
2025–	Almere City	18	(3)

International career
2014	Netherlands U16	1	(0)
2014–2015	Netherlands U17	15	(1)
2015	Netherlands U18	4	(0)
2016	Netherlands U19	8	(1)
- * Club domestic league appearances and goals as of 25 April 2026

Teun Bijleveld (born 27 May 1998) is a Dutch professional footballer who plays as a left-back and midfielder for Eerste Divisie club Almere City. (Note: Teun Bijleveld at WorldFootball.net)

== Club career ==
=== Early years ===
Bijleveld played youth football for SV Ouderkerk and AZ. He signed his first contract with AZ on 21 December 2014, keeping him at the club until 2017. He was part of the Jong AZ team winning the Tweede Divisie in 2016–17.

On 15 June 2017, Bijleveld joined Ajax on a two-year deal, and was added to their reserves Jong Ajax competing in the second-tier Eerste Divisie. He made his professional debut for Jong Ajax on 18 August 2017 in a 2–1 away win over Cambuur. On 25 September 2017, Bijleveld scored his first professional goal, helping his team to a 1–1 home draw against Telstar. Jong Ajax won the Eerste Divisie title in the 2017–18 season, but could, however, not win promotion due to Dutch league rules.

=== Heracles Almelo ===
On 21 June 2019, Bijleveld signed a two-year contract with Eredivisie club Heracles Almelo. He made his debut in the Eredivisie for Heracles on 4 August 2019, replacing Adrián Szőke in the 74th minute of a 4–0 home loss to Heerenveen. Bijleveld made 17 total appearances during the 2019–20 season, of which only two as a starter.

He was more involved in the 2020–21 season, making 22 appearances of which 13 as a starter. He lost his starting spot at the end of the season, and without making a decisive impact for Heracles, he left the club as a free agent as his contract expired in June 2021.

=== Emmen ===
On 7 July 2021, Bijleveld joined Eerste Divisie club Emmen on a two-year contract. He made his debut for the club on 6 August 2021, the first matchday of the 2021–22 season, starting in a 1–1 away draw against Telstar. He would also fail to make an impact for Emmen, making only two starts that season in 13 total appearances. (Note: Teun Bijleveld at Soccerway) Emmen won the Eerste Divisie title that season, winning promotion back to the Eredivisie.

He left the club before the start of the new season, as the two parties mutually agreed to a contract termination.

=== Roda JC ===
On 30 August 2022, Bijleveld signed a two-year contract with Eerste Divisie club Roda JC. He made his Roda debut on 4 September 2022 in a Limburg derby against MVV, starting in a 1–1 draw. On 11 December 2022, Bijleveld scored his first goal for the club, as well as his first competitive goal in more than four years, opening the score in a 3–1 home loss to his former club Heracles.

On 21 June 2024, it was announced that Bijleveld and Roda had failed to reach an agreement to extend his expiring contract, making him a free agent.

=== Triestina ===
On 17 July 2024, Bijleveld joined Serie C side Triestina on a permanent deal, signing a two-year contract with the Italian club.

=== Almere City ===
On 23 June 2025, it was announced that Bijleveld would join Eerste Divisie club Almere City on a permanent deal on 1 July, signing a three-year contract.

== International career ==
Bijleveld is a youth international for the Netherlands, having gained 28 caps at different youth levels.

== Career statistics ==
As of match played 25 April 2025

Appearances and goals by club, season and competition
Club	Season	League			National cup		Europe		Other		Total	
Club	Season	Division	Apps	Goals	Apps	Goals	Apps	Goals	Apps	Goals	Apps	Goals
Jong AZ	2016–17	Tweede Divisie	5	0	—		—		—		5	0
Jong Ajax	2017–18	Eerste Divisie	29	2	—		—		—		29	2
Jong Ajax	2018–19	Eerste Divisie	26	2	—		—		—		26	2
Jong Ajax	Total		55	4	—		—		—		55	4
Heracles Almelo	2019–20	Eredivisie	15	0	2	0	—		—		17	0
Heracles Almelo	2020–21	Eredivisie	20	0	2	0	—		—		22	0
Heracles Almelo	Total		35	0	4	0	—		—		39	0
Emmen	2021–22	Eerste Divisie	12	0	1	0	—		—		13	0
Roda JC	2022–23	Eerste Divisie	27	1	0	0	—		—		27	1
Roda JC	2023–24	Eerste Divisie	28	1	0	0	—		0	0	28	1
Roda JC	Total		55	2	0	0	—		0	0	55	2
Triestina	2024–25	Serie C	17	1	—		—		1 (Note: Appearances in the Coppa Italia Serie C.)	0	18	1
Career total			179	7	5	0	0	0	1	0	185	7

== Honours ==
Jong AZ

- Tweede Divisie: 2016–17

Jong Ajax

- Eerste Divisie: 2017–18

Emmen

- Eerste Divisie: 2021–22
