= Sinan County =

Sinan County may refer to a county with the same name in China and South Korea:

- Sinan County, Guizhou (思南县), of Tongren Prefecture, Guizhou, China
- Sinan County, South Jeolla (신안군 / 新安郡), in South Jeolla Province, South Korea
