= Sinan Bakış =

Footballer

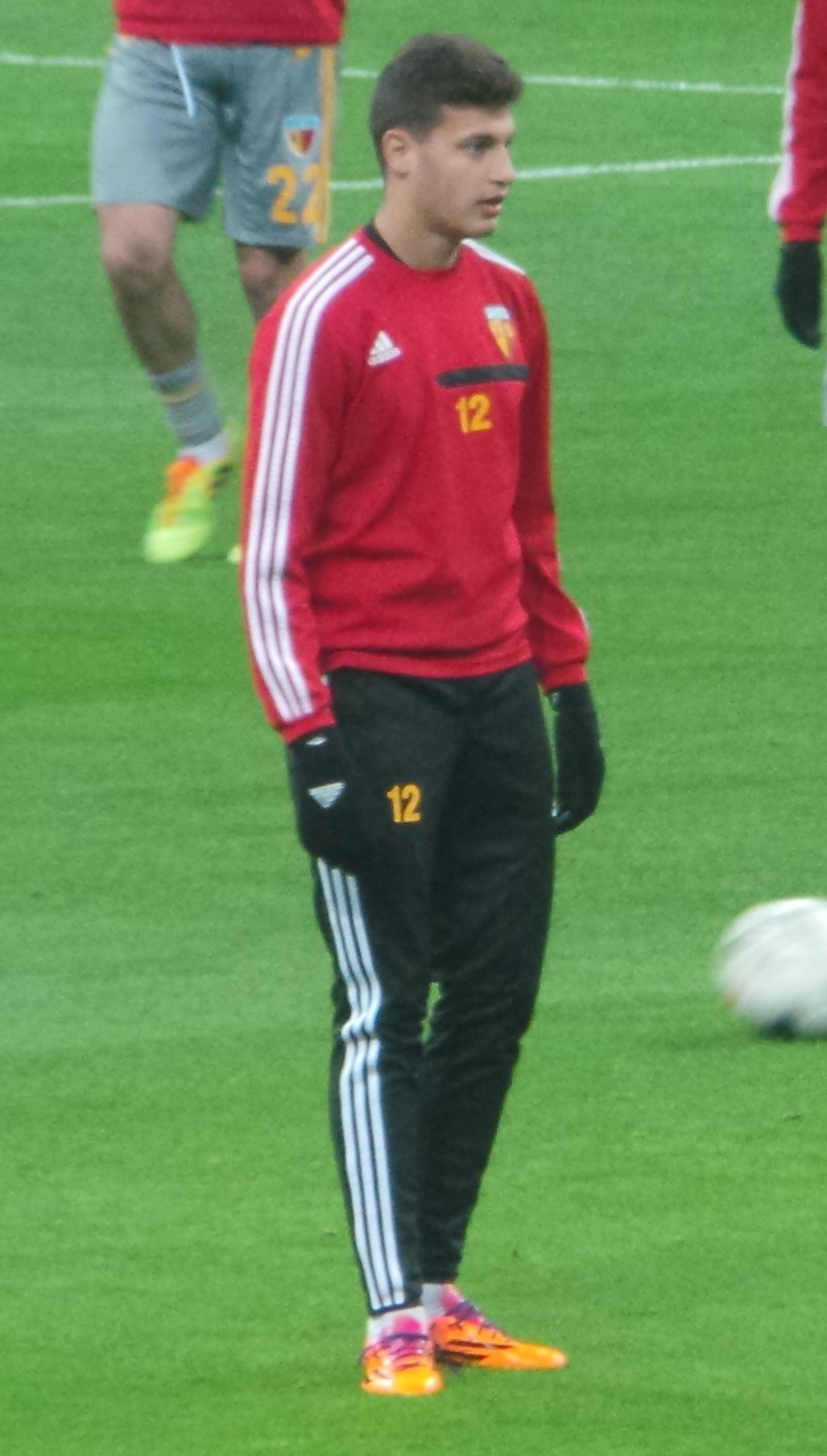
- Bakış warming up for Kayserispor in 2014

Personal information
- Full name: Sinan Bakış
- Date of birth: 22 April 1994 (age 32)
- Place of birth: Troisdorf, Germany
- Height: 1.88 m (6 ft 2 in)
- Position: Forward

Team information
- Current team: Gimnàstic

Youth career
- Bonner SC
- 2011–2013: Bayer Leverkusen

Senior career*
Years	Team	Apps	(Gls)
2013–2016	Kayserispor	29	(3)
2016–2018	Bursaspor	20	(1)
2018–2020	Admira Wacker	52	(16)
2020–2022	Heracles Almelo	59	(17)
2022–2023	Andorra	33	(12)
2023–2026	Zaragoza	28	(2)
2024–2025	→ Górnik Zabrze (loan)	14	(0)
2024	→ Górnik Zabrze II (loan)	2	(0)
2026–	Gimnàstic	0	(0)

International career
2012–2013	Turkey U19	9	(0)
2013	Turkey U20	5	(1)
2016	Turkey U21	1	(0)
- * Club domestic league appearances and goals as of 31 May 2026

Sinan Bakış (born 22 April 1994) is a professional footballer who plays as a forward for Spanish club Gimnàstic de Tarragona. He has previously played club football in the league systems of Turkey, Austria, the Netherlands, Spain and Poland. Born in Germany, Bakış has represented Turkey at youth level.

== Club career ==
=== Turkey ===
A Bayer Leverkusen youth graduate, Bakış joined Kayserispor in 2013. He made his Süper Lig debut on 15 September of that year, in a 1–1 draw against Gençlerbirliği. On 4 August 2014, while playing in a friendly match against Pazarspor, he suffered a torn meniscus in his left foot that would sideline him for half the season.

On 25 May 2016, Bakış signed a pre-contract agreement with Bursaspor, and joined them in the summer. He featured sparingly before leaving the club at the end of the 2017–18 season.

=== Abroad ===
Bakış signed for Austrian side Admira Wacker in July 2018 as a free agent. On 21 July 2020, he agreed to a contract with Dutch Eredivisie side Heracles Almelo.

Bakış switched teams and countries again on 1 September 2022, after signing a one-year contract with Andorra, who were newcomers to the Spanish Segunda División. He left the club after the exiry of his contract at the end of the 2022–23 season. On 5 July 2023, he moved to fellow Segunda División team Real Zaragoza on a three-year deal. He finished the 2023–24 season without scoring a single goal for Zaragoza.

On 27 August 2024, Bakış joined Polish Ekstraklasa club Górnik Zabrze on a season-long loan. Upon returning, he was rarely used by the Maños as the club suffered a first-ever relegation to Primera Federación, and joined Gimnàstic de Tarragona in that division on 6 August 2026.

== International career ==
Bakış represented Turkey at the 2013 UEFA U-19 Championship. He also represented his nation at the 2013 FIFA U-20 World Cup, in which he scored.

== Career statistics ==
As of match played 17 May 2025

Appearances and goals by club, season and competition
Club	Season	League			National cup (Note: Includes Turkish Cup, Austrian Cup, KNVB Cup)		Continental		Other		Total	
Club	Season	Division	Apps	Goals	Apps	Goals	Apps	Goals	Apps	Goals	Apps	Goals
Kayserispor	2013–14	Süper Lig	6	0	0	0	—		—		6	0
Kayserispor	2014–15	TFF 1. Lig	1	0	4	3	—		—		5	3
Kayserispor	2015–16	Süper Lig	22	3	9	5	—		—		31	8
Kayserispor	Total		29	3	13	8	0	0	0	0	42	11
Bursaspor	2016–17	Süper Lig	12	1	7	0	—		—		19	1
Bursaspor	2017–18	Süper Lig	8	0	5	1	—		—		13	1
Bursaspor	Total		20	1	12	1	0	0	0	0	32	2
Admira Wacker	2018–19	Austrian Bundesliga	27	4	0	0	2 (Note: Appearances in UEFA Europa League)	1	—		29	5
Admira Wacker	2019–20	Austrian Bundesliga	25	12	1	0	—		—		26	12
Admira Wacker	Total		52	16	1	0	2	1	0	0	55	17
Heracles Almelo	2020–21	Eredivisie	27	10	1	0	—		—		28	10
Heracles Almelo	2021–22	Eredivisie	31	6	1	1	—		1 (Note: Appearance in Eredivisie promotion/relegation play-offs)	1	33	8
Heracles Almelo	Total		58	16	2	1	0	0	1	1	61	18
Andorra	2022–23	Segunda División	33	12	1	0	—		2 (Note: Appearances in Copa Catalunya)	2	36	14
Real Zaragoza	2023–24	Segunda División	19	0	0	0	—		—		19	0
Górnik Zabrze (loan)	2024–25	Ekstraklasa	14	0	0	0	—		—		14	0
Górnik Zabrze II (loan)	2024–25	III liga, gr. III	2	0	—		—		—		2	0
Career total			227	48	29	10	2	1	3	3	261	62
