= Lucas Schoofs =

Belgian footballer

Personal information
- Date of birth: 3 January 1997 (age 29)
- Place of birth: Koersel, Belgium
- Height: 1.86 m (6 ft 1 in)
- Position: Midfielder

Team information
- Current team: Lommel
- Number: 15

Youth career
- –2014: Lommel United

Senior career*
Years	Team	Apps	(Gls)
2014–2015	Lommel United	26	(4)
2015–2019	Gent	0	(0)
2015–2016	→ Lommel United (loan)	31	(0)
2017	→ OH Leuven (loan)	10	(0)
2018–2019	→ NAC Breda (loan)	5	(0)
2019–2023	Heracles Almelo	96	(12)
2023–	Lommel	83	(24)

International career
2015–2016	Belgium U19	7	(0)
- * Club domestic league appearances and goals as of 20 April 2026

Lucas Schoofs (born 3 January 1997) is a Belgian footballer plays as a defending midfielder for Lommel. He began his career in the youth teams of Lommel United in 2014.

== Club career ==
Schoofs was educated at then-Belgian Second Division side Lommel United, in which he went through the youth teams. On 27 April 2014, he was selected for the last game of the 2013–14 season against Sint-Truiden and made his official, substituting Thomas Jutten in the 78th minute. In the 2014–15 season, he was included into the selection. Schoofs scored his first goal on 30 August 2014 against Roeselare.

On 29 August 2015, Schoofs was transferred to the national champions Gent. Gent allowed Schoofs first to develop a further year on loan at Lommel.

On 1 July 2023, Schoofs returned to Lommel on a four-year deal.

== Career statistics ==
As of 31 August 2018

Club	Season	League			Cup		Continental		Other		Total	
Club	Season	Division	Apps	Goals	Apps	Goals	Apps	Goals	Apps	Goals	Apps	Goals
Lommel United	2013–14	Belgian Second Division	1	0	0	0	–		0	0	1	0
Lommel United	2014–15	Belgian Second Division	25	4	2	0	–		6	0	33	4
Gent	2015–16	Belgian Pro League	0	0	0	0	0	0		0	0	0
Gent	2016–17	Belgian First Division A	0	0	0	0	1	0	0	0	1	0
Lommel United (loan)	2015–16	Belgian Second Division	31	0	2	0	–		6	0	39	0
OH Leuven (loan)	2016–17	Belgian First Division B	0	0	0	0	–		8	0	8	0
NAC Breda (loan)	2017–18	Eredivisie	5	0	0	0	–		0	0	5	0
Career total			62	4	4	0	1	0	20	0	87	4
