= Elias Oubella =

German footballer (born 2001)

Personal information
- Date of birth: 24 May 2001 (age 25)
- Place of birth: Neuss, Germany
- Height: 1.87 m (6 ft 2 in)
- Position: Centre-back

Team information
- Current team: FSV Frankfurt
- Number: 13

Youth career
- 2007–2009: Neuss-Weissenberg
- 2009–2012: Fortuna Düsseldorf
- 2012–2013: 1.FC Mönchengladbach
- 2013–2019: 1. FC Köln

Senior career*
Years	Team	Apps	(Gls)
2019–2020	1. FC Köln II	5	(0)
2020–2022	Heracles Almelo	0	(0)
2023–	FSV Frankfurt	5	(0)

International career^{‡}
2016–2017	Germany U16	3	(0)
2018–2019	Germany U18	3	(2)
- * Club domestic league appearances and goals as of 00:50, 4 July 2024 (UTC) ‡ National team caps and goals as of 3 March 2021

Elias Oubella (born 24 May 2001) is a German professional footballer who plays as a centre-back for FSV Frankfurt.

== Club career ==
Oubella was a youth product of 1. FC Köln since 2013, and moved to Heracles Almelo on 10 May 2020. He made his professional debut with Heracles Almelo in a 3–0 KNVB Cup win over SC Telstar on 28 October 2020.

== International career ==
Born in the Neuss, Germany, Oubella is of Moroccan descent. He is a youth international for Germany.
