= Giacomo Quagliata =

Italian footballer

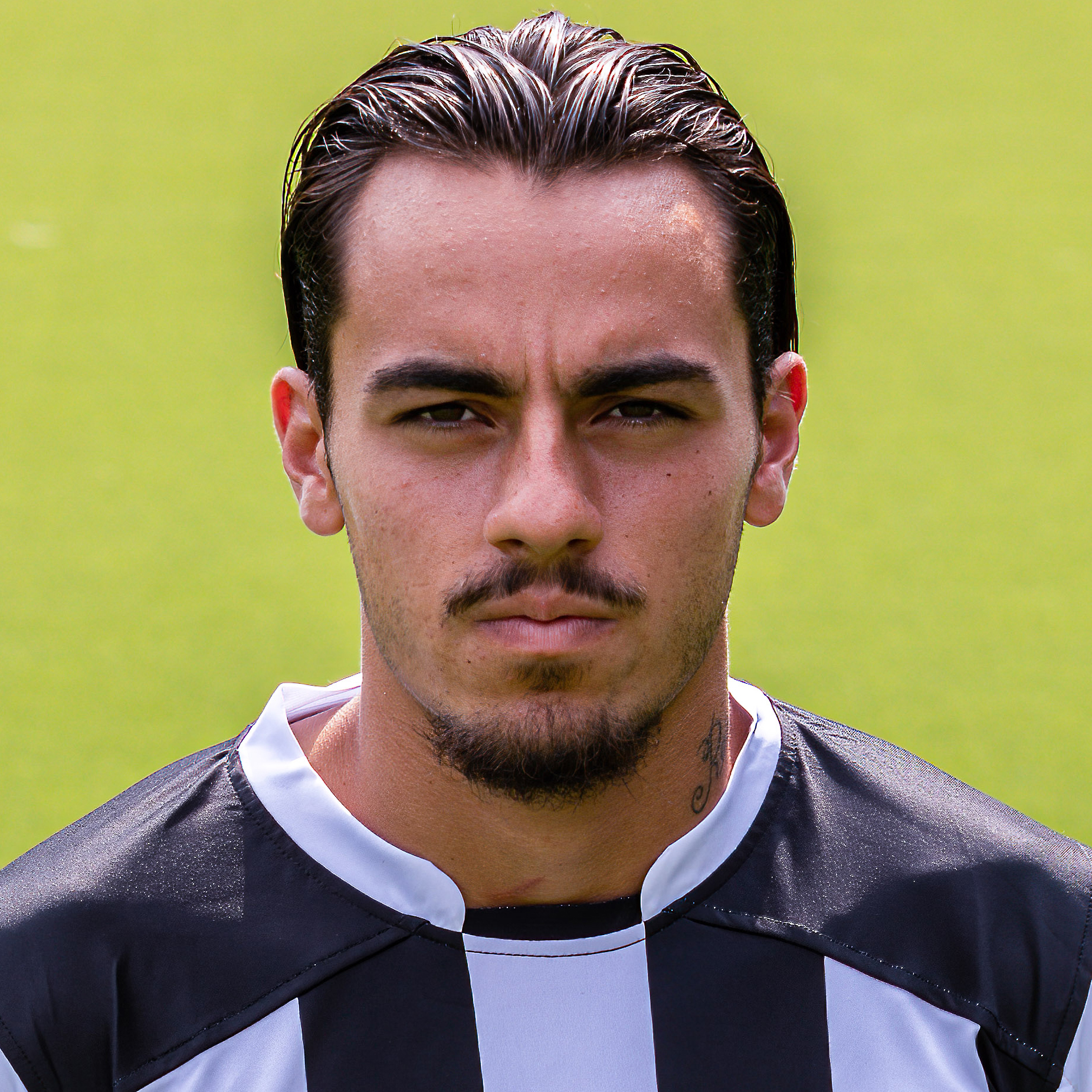

Personal information
- Date of birth: 19 February 2000 (age 26)
- Place of birth: Palermo, Italy
- Height: 1.80 m (5 ft 11 in)
- Position: Left-back

Team information
- Current team: Deportivo A Coruña
- Number: 12

Youth career
- –2016: Calcio Sicilia
- 2016–2018: Pro Vercelli

Senior career*
Years	Team	Apps	(Gls)
2018–2020	Pro Vercelli	16	(0)
2018–2019	→ Latina (loan)	19	(2)
2019	→ Bari (loan)	13	(0)
2020–2022	Heracles Almelo	54	(1)
2022–2025	Cremonese	61	(0)
2025	→ Catanzaro (loan)	15	(2)
2025–	Deportivo A Coruña	38	(2)

International career
2021–2022	Italy U21	5	(1)
- * Club domestic league appearances and goals as of 31 May 2026

Giacomo Quagliata (Italian pronunciation: [kwaʎˈʎaːta]; born 19 February 2000) is an Italian professional footballer who plays as a left-back for La Liga club Deportivo A Coruña.

== Club career ==
Quagliata made his professional debut with Pro Vercelli in a 5–1 Coppa Italia loss to Ascoli on 10 August 2020. In January 2020, he joined Dutch club Heracles Almelo of the Eredivisie.

In July 2022, Quagliata returned to Italy and signed for Cremonese.

On 18 January 2025, he joined Catanzaro on loan, with an option to buy and a conditional obligation to buy.

On 30 July 2025, Quagliata signed a three-year contract with Spanish club Deportivo de A Coruña of the Segunda División.
