= Rai Vloet =

Dutch footballer

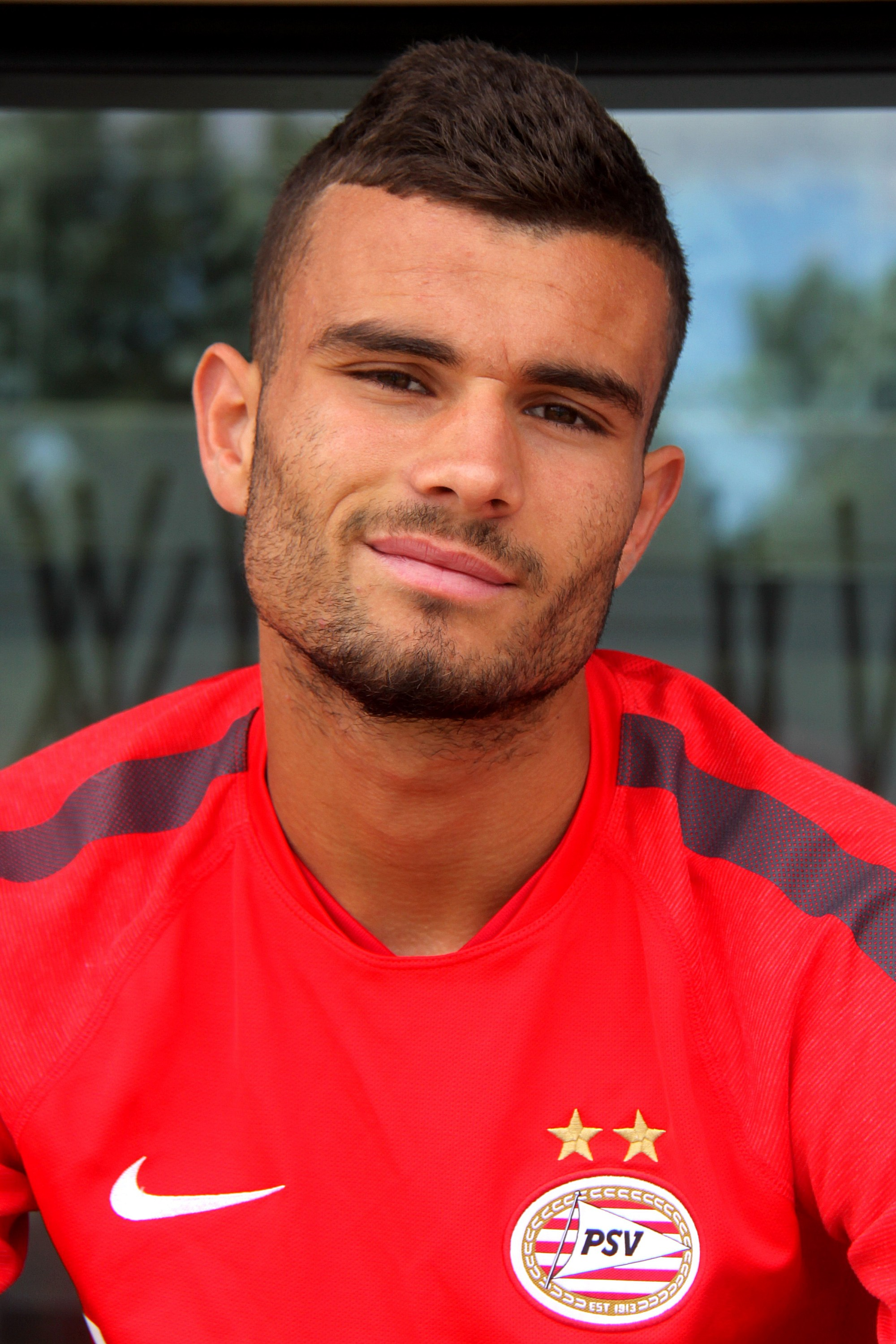
- Vloet with PSV in 2014

Personal information
- Full name: Rai Hendrikus Martinus Vloet
- Date of birth: 8 May 1995 (age 31)
- Place of birth: Schijndel, Netherlands
- Height: 1.88 m (6 ft 2 in)
- Position: Attacking midfielder

Team information
- Current team: Cape Town City
- Number: 10

Youth career
- –2005: SVN
- 2005–2013: PSV

Senior career*
Years	Team	Apps	(Gls)
2013–2017	PSV	9	(0)
2013–2016	Jong PSV	53	(16)
2016	→ Cambuur (loan)	8	(0)
2016–2017	→ FC Eindhoven (loan)	32	(12)
2017–2018	NAC Breda	31	(4)
2018	Chiasso	0	(0)
2018–2019	Frosinone	5	(0)
2019	Sint-Truiden	2	(0)
2019–2020	Excelsior	29	(14)
2020–2022	Heracles Almelo	45	(19)
2022	Astana	14	(5)
2022–2024	Ural Yekaterinburg	20	(4)
2026–	Cape Town City		

International career^{‡}
2011–2012	Netherlands U17	16	(3)
2012–2013	Netherlands U18	4	(1)
2013–2014	Netherlands U19	10	(3)
2014	Netherlands U20	3	(1)
2015	Netherlands U21	3	(2)
- * Club domestic league appearances and goals as of 25 May 2024 ‡ National team caps and goals as of 18:40, 24 June 2015 (UTC)

Rai Hendrikus Martinus Vloet (born 8 May 1995) is a Dutch professional footballer who plays as an attacking midfielder for Cape Town City.

== Club career ==
Vloet was born in Schijndel. He made his professional debut as Jong PSV player in the second division on 20 September 2013 against FC Den Bosch coming on as a substitute in the 74th minute.

On 20 September 2016, while on loan at FC Eindhoven, Rai Vloet scored a goal in the 87th minute against FC Den Bosch, coached by his father Wiljan Vloet, to win 3–2 in the 2016–17 KNVB Cup. For the 2017–18 season he joined NAC Breda.

On 15 August 2018, after signing to Swiss club Chiasso, Vloet was bought by Italian side Frosinone. In January 2019, he left Frosinone by mutual consent.

On 4 February 2019, Vloet was signed by Belgian side Sint-Truiden as a free agent.

On 13 July 2019, he joined Eerste Divisie club Excelsior on a one-year contract with an option for another year.

On 22 June 2020, he joined Eredivisie club Heracles Almelo.

On 25 March 2022, FC Astana announced the signing of Vloet. On 6 September 2022, Astana announced that Vloet had moved to Ural Yekaterinburg after they had exercised a release clause in Vloet contract.

Vloet's contract with Ural was terminated by mutual consent in June 2024, following the club's relegation from the Russian Premier League.

On 5 July 2026, South African National First Division club Cape Town City announced the singing of Vloet.

== Personal life ==
Vloet was one of two men arrested on 14 November 2021 after the car in which both men were travelling was involved in a fatal collision with another vehicle on the A4 motorway near Hoofddorp that resulted in the death of a four-year-old boy. In January 2022, Vloet's club Heracles Almelo suspended him with immediate effect after being confronted with the police report by newspaper De Telegraaf. According to the police report, Vloet and the other man had stated that they did not drive the car. A breath test showed that Vloet had twice the permitted blood alcohol level and the on-board computer of Vloet's car showed that the driving speed was 193 kilometers per hour while the Netherlands has a speed limit of 130 km/h.

In March 2023, the Public Ministry demanded a prison sentence of three years and six months and a four-year driving ban for Vloet for causing the fatal accident. On 3 April 2023, he was sentenced to two years and six months in prison and received a four-year driving ban. The sentence was reduced as the court considered the impact of the intense media attention on Vloet's professional career and the remorse he showed during the trial. On 9 September 2024, Vloet withdrew his appeal, and the Public Ministry followed suit, partly out of consideration for the victims' families, thereby upholding the sentence.

== Career statistics ==
As of match played 1 June 2024

Appearances and goals by club, season and competition
Club	Season	League			Cup		Continental		Other		Total	
Club	Season	Division	Apps	Goals	Apps	Goals	Apps	Goals	Apps	Goals	Apps	Goals
Jong PSV	2013–14	Eerste Divisie	26	5	–		–		–		26	5
Jong PSV	2014–15	Eerste Divisie	13	4	–		–		–		13	4
Jong PSV	2015–16	Eerste Divisie	12	7	–		–		–		12	7
Jong PSV	2016–17	Eerste Divisie	2	0	–		–		–		2	0
Jong PSV	Total		53	16	0	0	0	0	1	0	53	16
PSV	2013–14	Eredivisie	0	0	0	0	0	0	–		0	0
PSV	2014–15	Eredivisie	8	0	1	0	3 (Note: Appearances in the UEFA Europa League)	0	–		12	0
PSV	2015–16	Eredivisie	1	0	2	0	1 (Note: Appearance in the UEFA Champions League)	0	–		4	0
PSV	Total		9	0	3	0	4	0	0	0	16	0
Cambuur	2015–16	Eredivisie	8	0	–		–		–		8	0
FC Eindhoven	2016–17	Eerste Divisie	32	12	2	1	–		–		34	13
NAC Breda	2017–18	Eredivisie	31	4	1	1	–		–		32	5
Frosinone	2018–19	Serie A	5	0	–		–		–		5	0
Sint-Truiden	2018–19	Belgian Pro League	0	0	–		–		2 (Note: Appearances in the Europa League play-offs)	0	2	0
Excelsior	2019–20	Eerste Divisie	29	14	2	0	–		–		31	14
Heracles Almelo	2020–21	Eredivisie	33	16	2	1	–		–		35	17
Heracles Almelo	2021–22	Eredivisie	12	3	1	2	–		–		13	5
Heracles Almelo	Total		45	19	3	3	0	0	0	0	48	22
Astana	2022	Kazakhstan Premier League	14	5	3	2	2 (Note: Appearances in the UEFA Europa Conference League)	0	–		19	7
Ural Yekaterinburg	2022–23	Russian Premier League	15	4	10	3	–		–		25	7
Ural Yekaterinburg	2023–24	Russian Premier League	5	0	2	0	–		2 (Note: Appearances in the relegation play-offs)	0	9	0
Ural Yekaterinburg	Total		20	4	12	3	–		2	0	34	7
Career total			246	74	26	10	6	0	4	0	282	84
