= Navajo Bakboord =

Surinamese footballer (born 1999)

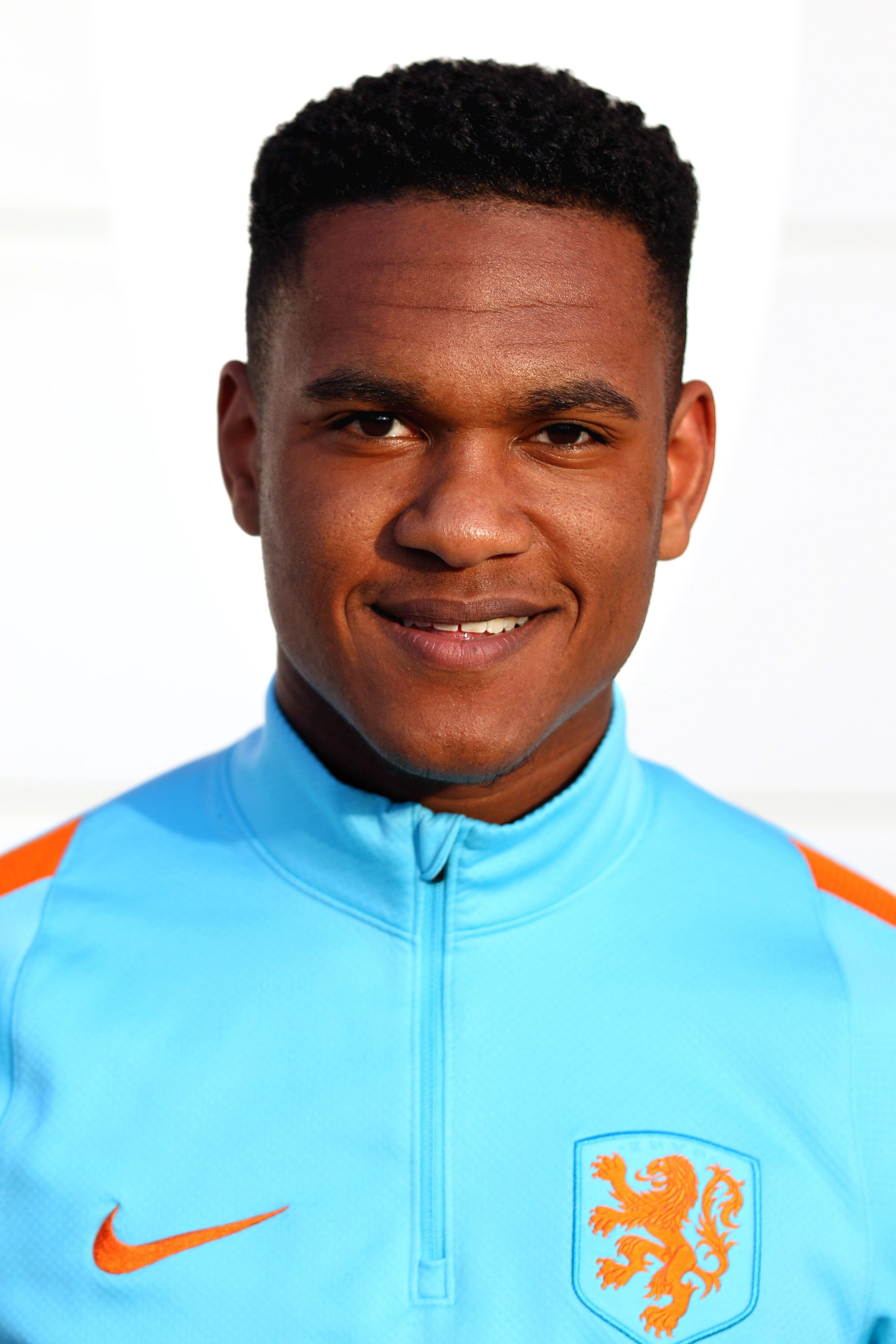

Personal information
- Full name: Navajo Marcelino Bakboord
- Date of birth: 29 January 1999 (age 27)
- Place of birth: Amsterdam, Netherlands
- Height: 1.77 m (5 ft 10 in)
- Position: Right back

Team information
- Current team: RKC Waalwijk
- Number: 25

Youth career
- 2003–2005: ASV Fortius
- 2005–2007: ASV-DWV
- 2007–2018: Ajax

Senior career*
Years	Team	Apps	(Gls)
2017–2019	Jong Ajax	24	(0)
2019−2024	Heracles	61	(0)
2025	Waterford	12	(0)
2026–	RKC Waalwijk	5	(0)

International career^{‡}
2013–2014	Netherlands U15	3	(0)
2014–2015	Netherlands U16	12	(0)
2015–2016	Netherlands U17	12	(0)
2016–2017	Netherlands U18	6	(0)
2017	Netherlands U19	7	(0)
2018	Netherlands U20	6	(0)
2023–	Suriname	7	(0)
- * Club domestic league appearances and goals as of 25 April 2026 ‡ National team caps and goals as of 22:43, 13 June 2025 (UTC)

Navajo Marcelino Bakboord (born 29 January 1999) is a footballer who plays as a right back for Eerste Divisie club RKC Waalwijk. Born in the Netherlands, he plays for the Suriname national team.

== Club career ==
Bakboord made his Eerste Divisie debut for Jong Ajax on 1 December 2017 in a game against MVV. On 23 May 2019 it has been announced that Bakboord signed with Heracles Almelo. On 9 January 2025, Bakboord signed for League of Ireland Premier Division club Waterford. On 22 November 2025, he departed Waterford by mutual consent after making just 12 league appearances for the club. On 25 February 2026, he signed for Eerste Divisie club RKC Waalwijk until the end of the season.

== International career ==
Born in the Netherlands, Bakboord is of Surinamese descent. He is a former youth international for the Netherlands, having played for them up to the Netherlands U20s. In June 2023, he switched to play for the Suriname national team for a set of 2023 CONCACAF Gold Cup qualification matches.

== Honours ==
Jong Ajax

- Eerste Divisie: 2017–18
