= Orestis Kiomourtzoglou =

German footballer

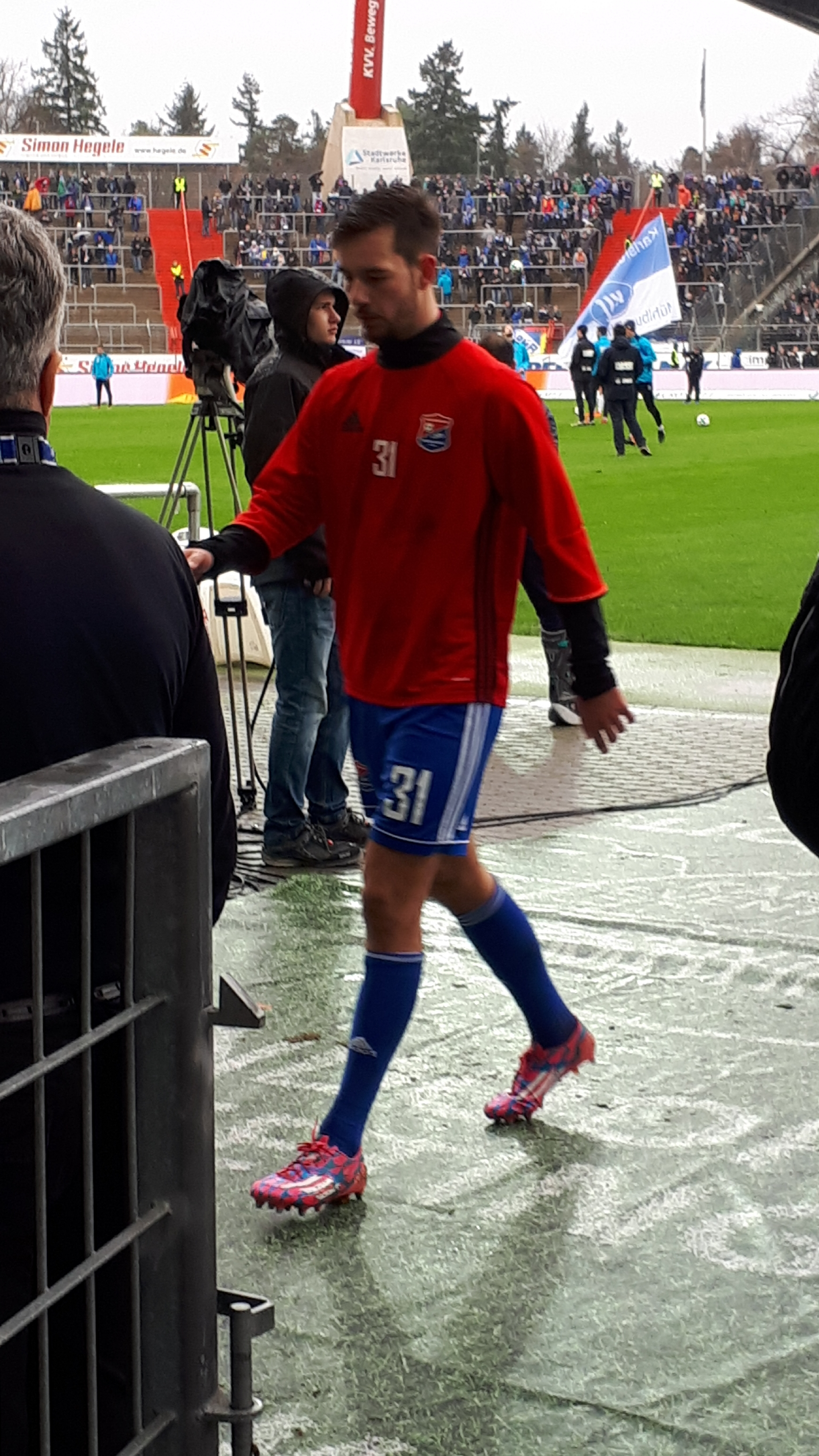
- Kiomourtzoglou in 2018

Personal information
- Date of birth: 7 May 1998 (age 28)
- Place of birth: Munich, Germany
- Height: 1.88 m (6 ft 2 in)
- Position: Midfielder

Youth career
- 2005–2015: SpVgg Unterhaching

Senior career*
Years	Team	Apps	(Gls)
2015–2019	SpVgg Unterhaching	95	(11)
2019–2022	Heracles Almelo	78	(4)
2022–2023	Heart of Midlothian	23	(0)
2023–2024	Greuther Fürth	7	(0)
2024–2026	Wehen Wiesbaden	27	(1)

International career
2019	Germany U21	2	(0)
- * Club domestic league appearances and goals as of 16 May 2026

Orestis Kiomourtzoglou (Greek: Ορέστης Κιομουρτζόγλου; born 7 May 1998) is a German professional footballer who plays as a midfielder.

A SpVgg Unterhaching youth product, he made his senior debut in 2015 and remained with the club until 2019 when he moved to Dutch club Heracles Almelo. In 2022, he signed with Scottish side Heart of Midlothian.

== Club career ==
Born on 7 May 1998 in Munich, into a Greek family, Kiomourtzoglou began his career in 2005 as a seven-year-old in the youth department of SpVgg Unterhaching. After playing in the various youth teams of Unterhaching, he made his senior debut on 17 July 2015, the first matchday of the 2015–16 season, in a game against FC Ingolstadt II in the Regionalliga Bayern, as an 84th-minute substitute for Maximilian Bauer. Two minutes after coming on, he scored his first senior goal to make the score 2–2. On 28 July 2017, the second matchday of the 2017–18 season, he made his professional debut, after Unterhaching had achieved promotion to the 3. Liga. He did this in a 3–2 win over Karlsruher SC. In the second match against Karlsruher SC during the season, a 3–1 loss on 20 January 2018, Kiomourtzoglou scored his first professional goal.

After playing fourteen years for Unterhaching, and making 94 first-team appearances for the team, Kiomourtzoglou signed with Dutch Eredivisie club Heracles Almelo in June 2019. Since his first league appearance for Heracles in a 1–1 draw against Fortuna Sittard on 11 August 2019, he had been a regular starter.

On 28 August 2022, Kiomourtzoglou signed a three-year contract with Heart of Midlothian in Scotland.

On 5 August 2024, Kiomourtzoglou moved to Wehen Wiesbaden in 3. Liga.

== International career ==
Internationally, he has represented Germany at U21 level.

== Career statistics ==
As of match played 22 November 2025

Appearances and goals by club, season and competition
Club	Season	League			National cup (Note: Includes DFB-Pokal, KNVB Cup, Scottish Cup)		Continental		Other		Total	
Club	Season	Division	Apps	Goals	Apps	Goals	Apps	Goals	Apps	Goals	Apps	Goals
Unterhaching	2015–16	Regionalliga	17	1	1	0	—		—		18	1
Unterhaching	2016–17	Regionalliga	22	6	0	0	—		—		22	6
Unterhaching	2017–18	3. Liga	29	2	0	0	—		—		29	2
Unterhaching	2018–19	3. Liga	27	2	—		—		—		27	2
Unterhaching	Total		95	11	1	0	—		—		96	11
Heracles	2019–20	Eredivisie	24	2	3	0	—		—		27	2
Heracles	2020–21	Eredivisie	27	0	0	0	—		—		27	0
Heracles	2021–22	Eredivisie	24	2	2	0	—		0	0	26	2
Heracles	2022–23	Eerste Divisie	3	0	—		—		—		3	0
Heracles	Total		78	4	5	0	—		0	0	83	4
Hearts	2022–23	Scottish Premiership	23	0	1	0	3 (Note: Appearance in UEFA Europa Conference League)	0	—		27	0
Greuther Fürth	2023–24	2. Bundesliga	7	0	1	0	—		—		8	0
Wehen Wiesbaden	2024–25	3. Liga	24	1	1	0	—		—		25	1
Wehen Wiesbaden	2025–26	3. Liga	3	0	0	0	—		—		3	0
Wehen Wiesbaden	Total		27	1	1	0	—		—		28	1
Career total			230	16	9	0	3	0	0	0	242	16
