= Sinan Pasha Mosque (Damascus) =

Mosque in Damascus, Syria

- جَامِع السِّنَانِيَّة - جَامِع سنان باشا
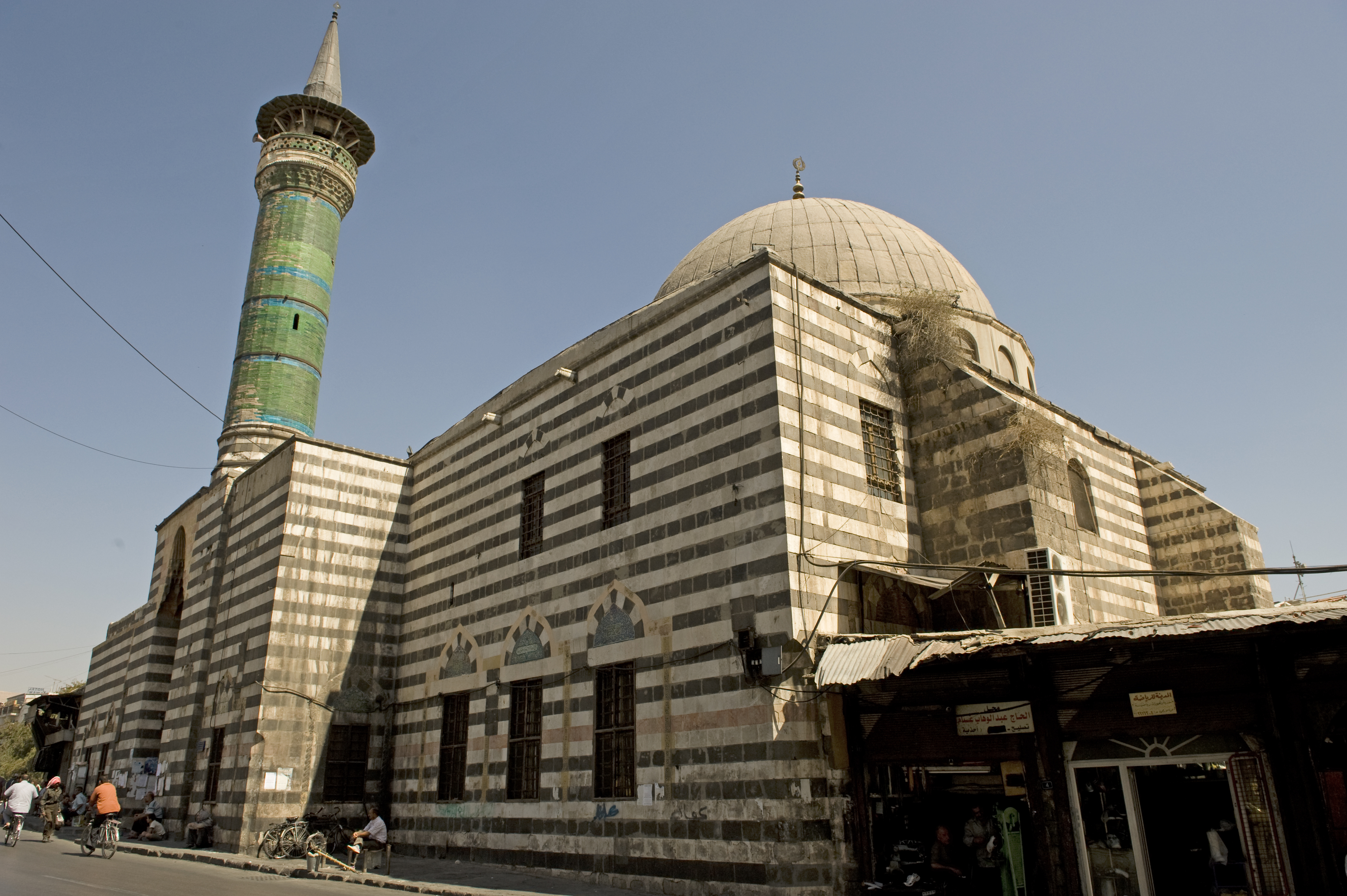

- Location of the mosque in Damascus

Religion
- Affiliation: Sunni Islam
- Ecclesiastical or organisational status: Mosque
- Status: Active

Location
- Location: Suq Sinaniyya, Damascus
- Country: Syria
- Interactive map of Sinan Pasha Mosque
- Coordinates: 33°30′28.25″N 36°18′6″E

Architecture
- Type: Mosque
- Style: Ottoman
- Founder: Sinan Pasha
- Completed: 1590 CE

Specifications
- Dome: 8
- Minaret: 1
- Materials: Stone, marble, tile

The Sinan Pasha Mosque (Arabic: جَامِع سنان باشا, romanized: Jāmiʿ Sinān Bāšā) or Al-Sinaniyya Mosque (Arabic: جَامِع السِّنَانِيَّة, romanized: Jāmiʿ as-Sinānīyah) is an early Ottoman-era mosque in Damascus, Syria, located along Suq Sinaniyya Street.

== History ==
The mosque was built in 1590 by Sinan Pasha, the Ottoman-appointed governor of Damascus from 1589 to 1593. It stands on the site of an older mosque called the Mosque of Basal to the southwest of the walled city. Sinan Pasha, who also served as the governor of Cairo and as the grand vizier to the sultan, was known for his role in the Ottoman conquest of Yemen.

== Architecture ==
The Sinan Pasha Mosque is built with an alternating course of black and white stone. In addition to the mosque itself are a madrasa and an ablution fountain.

The arched entrance of the western mosque portal is topped by a glazed tile panel composed of floral motifs above the marble panel with Arabic inscriptions anchored by square mosaic panels on both sides. The circular, green-enameled brick minaret rises above the southern pier of the portal, carried on a circular stone base of black and white stone. Its single balcony is supported by three rows of muqarnas and is protected by a carved stone balustrade below wooden eaves. The minaret ends at a pointed conical crown.

=== Interior ===
The mosque consists of a prayer hall covered with a large dome situated on the southern side of the courtyard, accessed through a portico elevated by two steps and covered by seven small domes supported on marble columns. The columns of the central bay have a spiral molding. The arched entryway is flanked by marble mosaic panels and the two windows of the portico façade, as well as the two side entrances are topped by arches whose tympana display Damascene tiles.

The mihrab niche to the right of the entrance is covered with a semi-dome that is supported on marble colonettes. The entire portico façade is built with alternating strips of yellow, white and gray stones. The mihrab is situated on the southern wall facing the entrance. Its niche is covered with stone mosaics and its semi-dome displays an intricate zigzag layering of black and white stones. Above its frame of tile and stone bands is a Quranic inscription. The ensemble is topped by two arched windows and a rosette made of stained glass. The minbar, to the left of the mihrab, is made of marble carved with floral motifs and inscriptions and roofed by a conical dome.

=== Courtyard ===
The prayer hall is preceded by a courtyard, accessed through a tall muqarnas portal on the western wall, once flanked by a bathhouse, a bakery and shops. The courtyard is also entered from Suq al-Sakkaniyya Street to the north. The courtyard is roughly rectangular and has an octagonal ablution basin at its center. Its floor is paved with colored stones arranged in a geometric layout.

A two-bay iwan occupies the northwest corner of the courtyard that has two arched windows facing the street. The north wall of the courtyard has an archway leading to Suq al-Sukkariyya and a tall panel flanking a water fountain to its right. The fountain is in the form of an arched niche decorated with carved marble panels and glazed tiles and was renovated in 1893, according to an inscription above its arch. A wooden overhang shades the west and south sides of the courtyard, carried on carved stone brackets. The east and north walls of the courtyard are topped with a crenelated parapet.

== See also ==
- Sunni Islam in Syria
- List of mosques in Syria
