= Asito Stadion =

Multi-use stadium in Almelo, Netherlands

Coordinates: 52°20′20″N 6°39′2″E

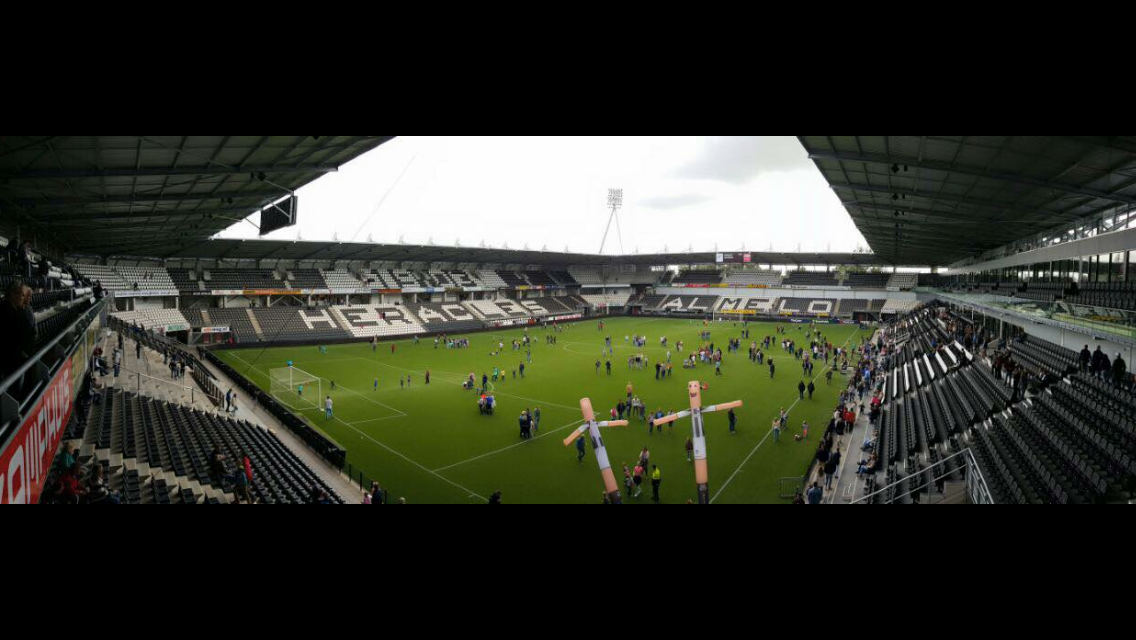
- Interactive map of Asito Stadion
- Location: Almelo, Netherlands
- Owner: Heracles Almelo
- Capacity: 12.242
- Surface: Hybrid grass

Construction
- Opened: 10 September 1999; 26 years ago
- Expanded: 2005; 2015

Tenant
- Heracles (1999–present)

Asito Stadion, formerly the Erve Asito (Dutch pronunciation: [ˈɛrvə aːˈsitoː]) and the Polman Stadion, is a multi-use stadium in Almelo, Netherlands. It is currently used mostly for football matches. The stadium has a capacity of 12.242 spectators and was built in 1999. It is the official stadium of Eredivisie side Heracles Almelo.

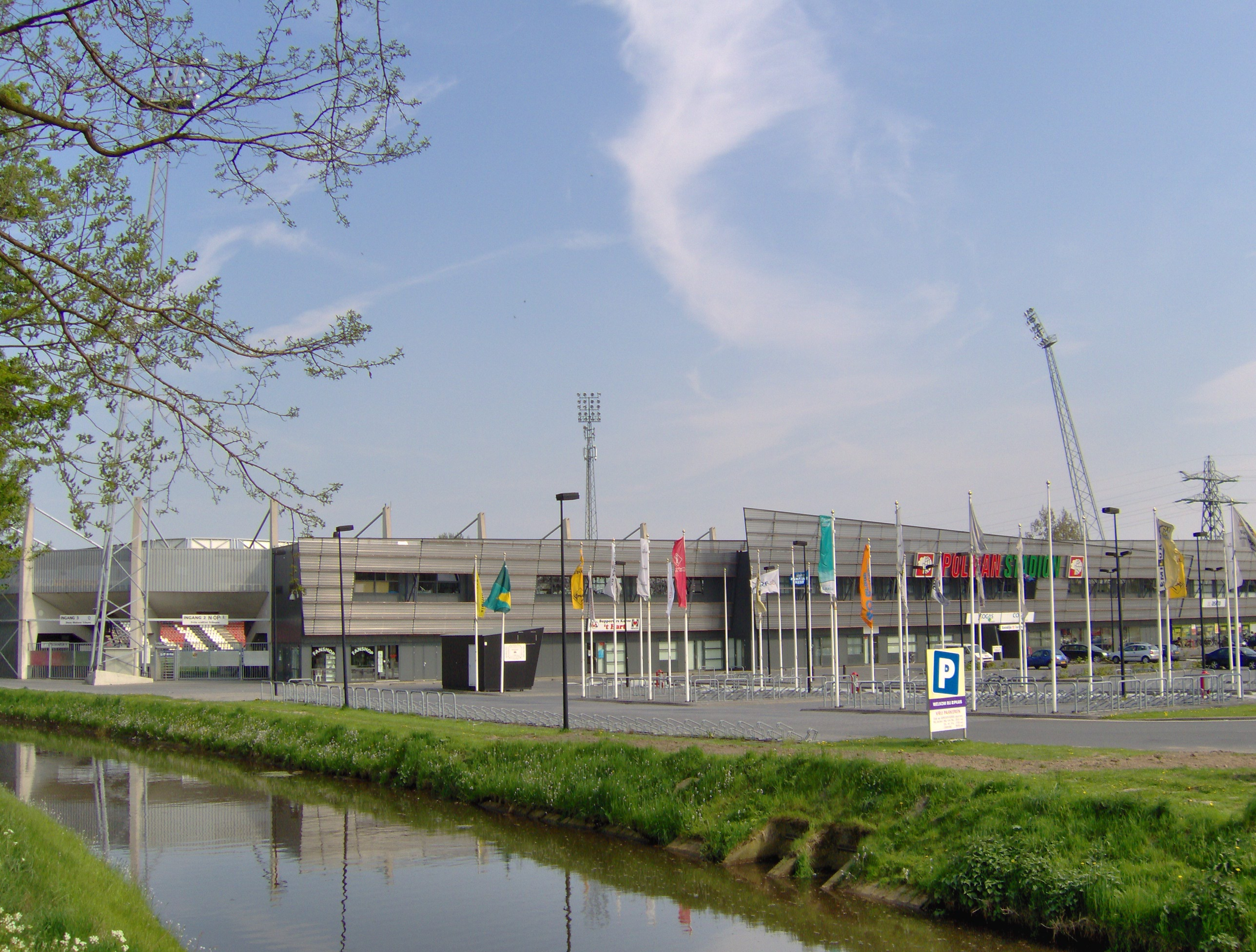
The Polman Stadion before the 2015 expansion

The stadium was opened on 10 September 1999, followed by the opening match against FC Zwolle. Heracles player Job ten Thije scored the first goal in the Polman Stadium. In 2005, the stadium's capacity was expanded from 6,900 to 8,500 seats, of which 400 are reserved for the visiting team's supporters. In 2015, the capacity was expanded to 12,080 seats.

On 1 July 2019, the stadium's name was changed to Erve Asito as part of a 10-year sponsorship agreement.

Since the 2024–25 season, the name has been changed to Asito Stadium.

== See also ==
- List of football stadiums in the Netherlands
- Lists of stadiums
