= Adrián Szőke =

Hungarian footballer (born 1998)

Personal information
- Date of birth: 1 July 1998 (age 28)
- Place of birth: Senta, Serbia, FR Yugoslavia
- Height: 1.86 m (6 ft 1 in)
- Position: Attacking midfielder

Team information
- Current team: Budafok
- Number: 27

Youth career
- Nyers István Akadémia
- TuS Blau-Weiß Königsdorf

Senior career*
Years	Team	Apps	(Gls)
2017–2019	Köln II	51	(15)
2019–2022	Heracles	39	(1)
2022–2023	Diósgyőr	14	(2)
2022	Diósgyőr II	2	(1)
2023	→ TSC (loan)	4	(0)
2025–	Budafok	1	(0)

International career^{‡}
2016	Serbia U18	2	(0)
2019–2021	Hungary U21	4	(1)
- * Club domestic league appearances and goals as of 20 January 2026 ‡ National team caps and goals as of 23 November 2019

Adrián Szőke (born 1 July 1998) is a Serbian-Hungarian footballer who plays as a midfielder for Budafok.

== Club career ==
Szőke signed a two-year contract with an option for an additional season with Eredivisie club Heracles Almelo on 7 July 2019.

On 22 June 2022, Szőke moved to Nemzeti Bajnokság II club Diósgyőr as a free agent.

== International career ==
Born in Serbia, he is ethnically Hungarian and has most recently represented Hungary at youth level.
