= Trainer! =

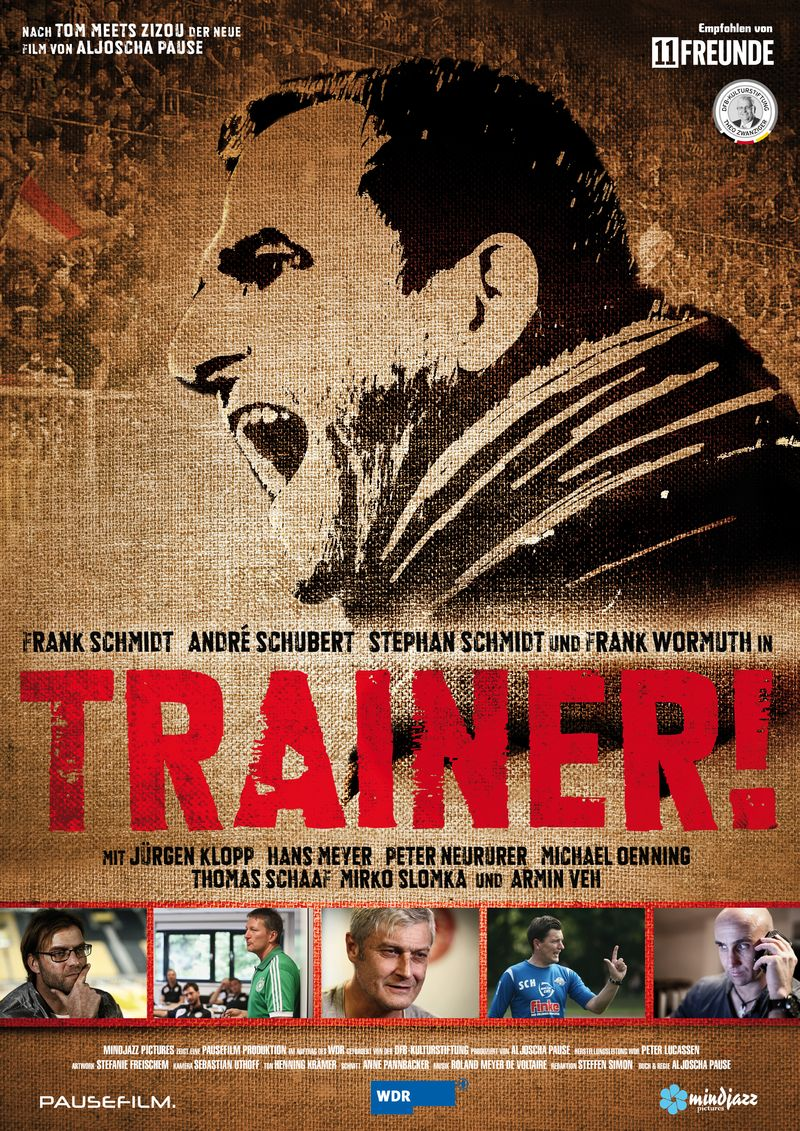
- Directed by: Aljoscha Pause
- Theme music composer: Roland Meyer de Voltaire
- Country of origin: Germany
- Original language: German

Production
- Producers: Aljoscha Pause; WDR
- Cinematography: Sebastian Uthoff
- Editor: Anne Pannbacker
- Running time: 138 minutes

Original release
- Release: 3 June 2013

Trainer! is a 2013 documentary film that was directed by Aljoscha Pause. It observes three young professional soccer coaches over the course of an entire playing season. The film was released on DVD and Blu-ray on 28 June 2013.

== Background and story ==
Trainer! takes a look at three young German professional soccer coaches, Frank Schmidt, André Schubert and Stephan Schmidt. The film also takes a look behind the scenes at the DFB football teachers’ training program led by Frank Wormuth. Established coaches like Jürgen Klopp, Hans Meyer, Armin Veh, Mirko Slomka, Peter Neururer, Thomas Schaaf and Michael Oenning also provide extensive insights.

Altogether, Pause spent six months researching and one year filming and editing. The film is a Pausefilm production commissioned by WDR (staff writer Steffen Simon). The television premiere of the 90-minute cut was broadcast on WDR on 3 June 2013, and the theater premiere of the 138-minute "director’s cut" premiered on 11 June at the Babylon Cinema in Berlin-Mitte. The film then toured Germany with the support of the DFB Cultural Foundation and distributor mindjazz pictures, garnering enthusiastic praise from the press.

The film was released on DVD and Blu-ray on June 28, 2013. Trainer! will be featured at the 2014 Flutlicht Film Festival in Basel, at the Joga Bonito! Festival in Vienna and at the Football Film Festival 2017 in Yokohama and Kobe.

Trainer! is available on Netflix (in English, German, Dutch, French, Spanish, Italian, Arabic and Japanese) since 2016.

== Reception ==
NDR2 gave Trainer! a positive review, writing that "Aljoscha Pause is to soccer documentaries as Ronald Reng is to soccer literature. It’s impossible to present football in a more forceful, genuine and fascinating way than is done in this film." Spiegel Online also praised Trainer, praising Pause for his depiction of the three coaches.

== Reviews ==
A candid portrait of three German coaches from soccer movie maestro Aljoscha Pause.

— Paste Magazine

This outstanding documentary deserves a championship title.

— Cinema

Once again, Germany’s best soccer documentarian provides sensational insights into the business.

— Lars-Christian Daniels, Filmstarts.de

An immensely fascinating, long-term exposé that clearly shows how well Aljoscha Pause knows the game. After watching it, you’ll be much better informed.

— filmdienst.de

== Awards ==
- The best Soccer Title on Netflix (Paste Magazine, 2017)
- VDS Television Prize (2014)
- Adolf Grimme Prize (2014, nominated)
