= Aljoscha Pause =

German filmmaker

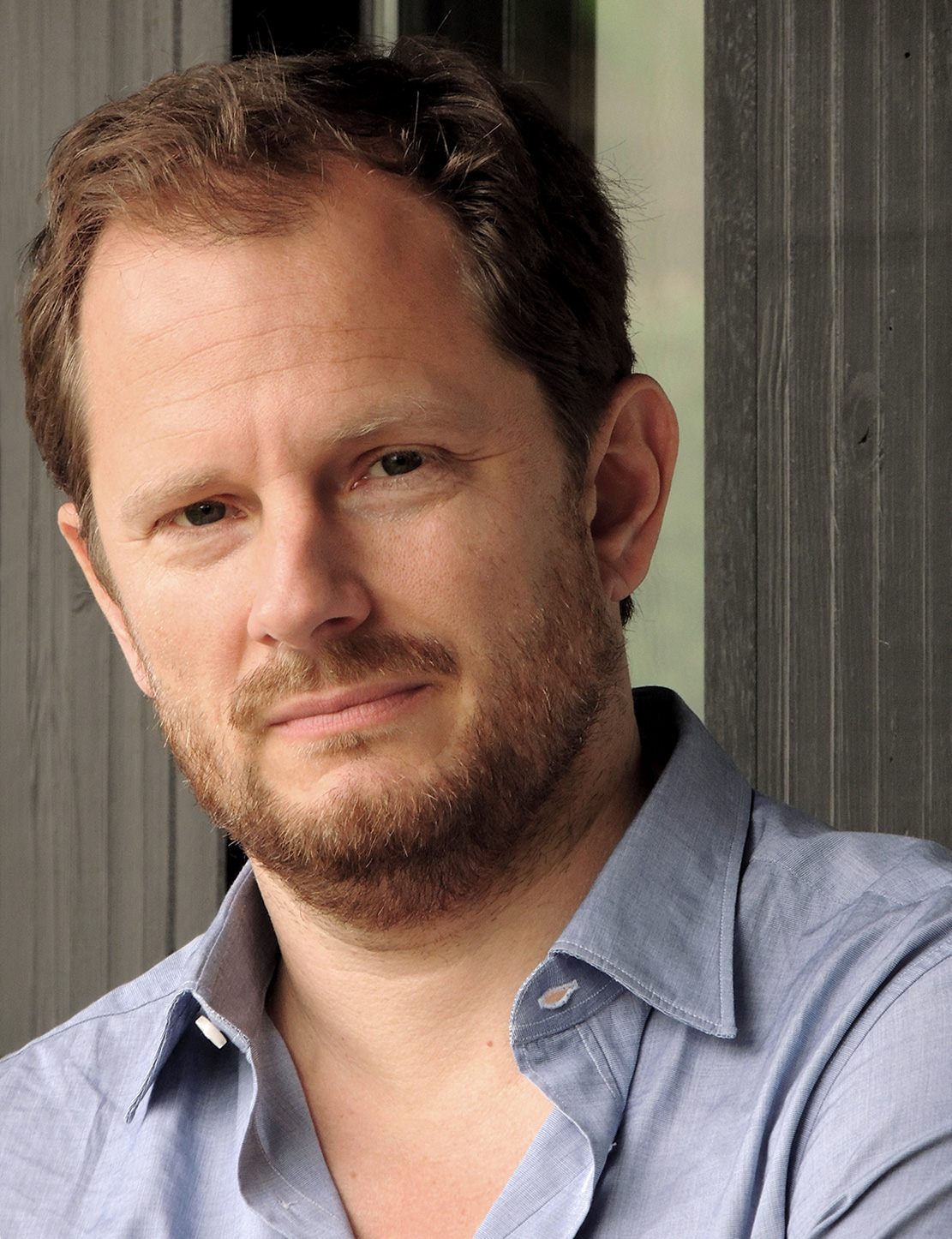
- Born: 24 January 1972 (age 54); Bonn, Germany
- Occupations: filmmaker, film director, TV journalist, writer, producer
- Website: www.pausefilm.de

Aljoscha Pause is a German filmmaker, director, TV journalist, writer, and producer. He is a member of the Deutsche Filmakademie and the German Academy for Football Culture.

== Background ==
Aljoscha Pause was born on 24 January 1972 in Bonn, Germany. After he graduated high school, he studied romance philology at Rheinische Friedrich-Wilhelms University. Pause received narration training at Deutsche Welle from 1998 until 2002.

Throughout his college years, Pause worked at Pantheon, a cabaret theater founded by his father, Rainer Pause. During this time he also began working as a reporter for a local magazine and a broadcaster at a private radio station (Radio Bonn/Rhein-Sieg).

He began his television career at age 24. Pause served as a sports reporter at German Sports Television (now Sport1) from 1996 to 1999. Following that, he worked as a reporter for the main sports desk at Kirch Media Group, Sat.1 until 2003. Pause also worked as a filmmaker, presenter, commentator, and field reporter for Premiere (now Sky Germany). Additionally, he held the position of a reporter for LIGA total!, the Bundesliga broadcaster of Deutsche Telekom, from 2009 until 2011.

Today, Pause lives with his wife and two daughters in Bonn.

== Cinematic works ==
In 2003, Pause became an independent filmmaker and producer. He is known for his longer documentary films primarily focusing on the sociopolitical aspects of sports (e.g. homophobia in football, hooliganism in sports, alcohol consumption in football, and the German Football League for the Blind). Pause is also known for his portrait documentaries, whose subjects are usually football players, but also include the actor Michael Jäger (an ex-hooligan who starred in the early-evening soap opera Marienhof). His first two full-length feature films, Tom meets Zizou) (2011) and Trainer! (2013) received acclaim from film critics internationally. In 2010, he received the Grimme Prize for a TV documentary series he produced about homophobia in football.

=== Trilogy – Homophobia in Football (2008–2011) ===
Created for Sky One and DSF with the support of the German Academy for Football Culture, Pause produced a three-part TV documentary series on homophobia in football filmed over the course of three years. The trilogy included The Great Taboo (2008), Breaking the Taboo (2009), and Football is Everything--Even Gay (2011).

The Great Taboo: Homophobia in Football (2008) premiered on DSF in 2008. The first investigative TV documentary on the subject to gain traction, it featured the stories of LGBTQ+ athletes like Tanja Walther and Anouschka Bernhard, who are both lesbians, and referee Marie Karsten, who is transgender.

The Great Taboo (2008) won the 2008 Felix Rexhausen Award from the Association of Lesbian and Gay Journalists (Bund Lesbischer und Schwuler Journalistlnnen, or BLSJ, the German affiliate of the NLGJA). The judges described it as an "honest, dispassionate stock-taking" of the LGBTQ+ experience for athletes in Germany "...[a]s informative as it is sober... [which] subtly reveals how widespread anti-gay feeling is in the world of football--on every level."

In 2009, Pause and DSF released the second installment of the three-part series, Breaking Taboo: The New Progress of Homosexuality in Football (2009). The film picks up one year after the release of its first installment, investigating developments in the German Football Association since the uptick of popular interest following the first film in 2008. In 2010, Breaking Taboo earned Pause an Alternative Media Prize and the Grimme Prize in the category for "Information & Culture/Special."

In March 2011, Pause released the final installment, entitled Football is Everything-Even Gay (2011). For the third installment, Pause monitored 18 months of developments and explores the difficulty of changing attitudes on the topic.

=== Tom meets Zizou (2011) ===
In 2011, Aljoscha Pause released a 135-minute documentary Tom meets Zizou (2011) after eight years of work. The film follows professional athlete Thomas Broich's career from its auspicious beginning in the Bundesliga up until his transfer to Brisbane Roar, an Australian club, in 2010.

Tom meets Zizou premiered on March 25, 2011 at the 8th International Football Film Festival 11mm in Berlin. It opened in theaters on July 28, under the banner of Mindjazz Pictures with support from the DFB Cultural Foundation. The film was released on DVD and Blu-Ray in late 2011. On August 21, 2012, Tom Meets Zizou (2011) gained additional popularity when a 90-minute version was broadcast on the German station WDR.

That same year, Tom meets Zizou (2011) received the VDS Television Prize. At the 11mm Football Film Festival, it received a nomination for "Best Football Film of All Time".

Tom meets Zizou (2011) was screened at the International Young Audience Film Festival (Poznań, Poland), the Thinking Football Film Festival (Bilbao), and ClNEfoot Festival (Rio de Janeiro). On February 1, 2014, it was screened at the Flutlicht Film Festival in a double feature on the subject of failure alongside Trainer!. The film has been translated into multiple languages including English, Polish, Spanish, and Portuguese.

=== Mesut, 17 (2013) ===
Pause's short film Mesut, 17 premiered in March 2013 at the 11mm Film Festival in Berlin. The subject of the nine-and-a-half-minute film is German athlete Mesut Özil, who was 17 years old at the time. The film is composed of footage initially produced by Pause for a broadcast report on a youth soccer tournament in 2006. Some of the footage had not previously aired. In addition to featuring the first-ever TV interview with Özil himself, it airs a statement by football manager Joachim Löw, former assistant to manager Jürgen Klinsmann.

While Pause created the film solely for use at the 10th anniversary of the 11mm Football Film Festival, it became popular after Mesut Özil posted it on Facebook, where it was seen by his 20 million followers. Due to subsequent widespread reporting in the media, Mesut, 17 received over one million views on YouTube and RTL Evening News reported on its spread as an internet phenomenon.

=== Trainer! (2013) ===
Following the success of Tom meets Zizou, Pause released Trainer! in early June 2013. For his second full-length documentary film, Pause follows three young professional coaches (Frank Schmidt, André Schubert, Stephan Schmidt) over the course of a football season.

The film also takes a look behind the scenes at the teachers' training program of the German Football Association (DFB) led by Frank Wormuth. Established coaches like Jürgen Klopp, Hans Meyer, Armin Veh, Mirko Slomka, Peter Neururer, Thomas Schaaf and Michael Oenning also provide extensive insight.

Pause spent six months on research and one year on filming and editing. The film is a Pausefilm production commissioned by WDR and editor Steffen Simon. The WDR television premiere of the 90-minute cut aired on June 3, 2013. On June 11, the 138-minute director's cut played at the Babylon cinema in Berlin-Mitte. The film then toured Germany with the support of the DFB Cultural Foundation and distributor Mindjazz Pictures, garnering praise from the press. On June 28, 2013, Trainer! was released on DVD and Blu-ray.

In early 2014, Pause received the VDS Television Prize after already receiving a nomination for the 2014 Adolf Grimme Prize. Trainer! was scheduled to be featured at the 2014 Flutlicht Film Festival in Basel and at the Joga Bonito! Festival in Vienna.

=== Being Mario Götze (2018) ===
In early June 2018, Pause released the documentary series Being Mario Götze - A German Football Story for the streaming service DAZN. For the series, Pause accompanied Mario Götze, the German footballer who won the 2014 World Cup, over the course of seven months as he attempts to return to his old level of performance and make it into the German 2018 World Cup squad. The documentary shows Götze's quest for a World Cup ticket, but also provides insights into his private life.

For the series, Pause received an Award of Merit from the Deutsche Film- und Medienbewertung (German Film and Media Rating, or FBW) in 2018 and a nomination for the 2019 AIPS - International Sport Media Award in the category for "Video: Athlete Profile." In 2019, it won the award for the best German-language sports film at the first VDS-SportFilmFest of the Verband Deutscher Sportjournalisten (Association of German Sports Journalists).

=== Inside Borussia Dortmund (2019) ===
In December 2018, Pause began working on a documentary about German Bundesliga club Borussia Dortmund. On August 9, 2019, the four-part documentary series was released on Amazon Prime Video under the title Inside Borussia Dortmund. In the series, Pause follows coaches, players and protagonists of Borussia Dortmund throughout the second half of the 2018-2019 Bundesliga season, providing insights into club life and the team. In 2020, the series was nominated for a Romy Austrian Film and Television Award in the category for "Best TV Documentary."

=== Like a Stranger – A German Pop Music Story (2020) ===
On June 5, 2020, Pause released Wie ein Fremder - Eine deutsche Popmusik-Geschichte (Like a Stranger-- A German Pop Music Story) on Blu-Ray and on-demand video. The five-part documentary series follows the life of musician Roland Meyer de Voltaire, former singer for the band Voltaire, over the course of six years.

=== Art is a State of Mind (2022) ===
In 2022, Pause released Art is a State of Mind. The six-part documentary series unfolds over the course of nine years, following Bernhard Zünkeler, an artist, curator, and former business lawyer.

Pause documents Zünkeler's journey establishing the ESMoA art lab and various artist collectives such as Freeters. In the film, the audience watches him develop a global coalition from Los Angeles and Havana to Berlin. His network includes, among others, Fidel Garcia from Cuba, graffiti artist Big Sleeps from South Central Los Angeles, and the artist Jim Reid. The German author Cornelia Funke also appears in the documentary.

The first broadcast of the complete docuseries aired on the German television channel 3sat on June 11, 2022.

=== Second Move Kills – 5 Years with Jens Spahn (2022) ===
In 2022, Pause released Second Move Kills - 5 Jahre mit Jens Spahn (Second Move Kills - 5 Years with Jens Spahn). The nine-part documentary series follows the life and experiences of Jens Spahn (a German politician, Bundestag member, and former Federal Minister of Health). The series begins in 2017 and unfolds over five years. It offers an inside look at Spahn's appointment as State Secretary and his appointment as Minister of Health. It includes footage of his life during the early course of the COVID-19 pandemic, crisis meetings, trips abroad, and Spahn's private life.

In addition to Jens Spahn, the series features other politicians (Annalena Baerbock, Dietmar Bartsch, Gerhart Baum, Annegret Kramp-Karrenbauer, Kevin Kühnert, Armin Laschet, Karl Lauterbach, Christian Lindner, Friedrich Merz, Claudia Roth, Wolfgang Schäuble, Edmund Stoiber), journalists (Bettina Gaus, Eva Quadbeck, Robin Alexander, Markus Feldenkirchen, Hajo Schumacher, Mai Thi Nguyen-Kim) and comedians (Max Giermann and Oliver Welke).

Second Move Kills (2022) first aired on November 2, 2022 on German television channel RTL+.

== Film productions (excerpts) ==
- 2001: The Borussia Legend – The Way Home (about the rise of Borussia Mönchengladbach) (German title: Mythos Borussia – Der Weg nach Hause (über Borussia Mönchengladbach und deren Aufstieg).
- 2005: The Prince from Bergheim – The Podolski Phenomenon (German title: Der Prinz aus Bergheim – Das Phänomen Podolski).
- 2005: Udo Lattek's 70th Birthday – A Trip Back (German title: 70 Jahre Udo Lattek – Eine Zeitreise).
- 2008: Not Seeing, Hearing – Blind soccer players meet Bundesliga professionals (German title: Hören statt Sehen – Blindenfußballer treffen auf Bundesliga-Profis).
- 2008: The Michael Jäger Story – From a Hooligan to a TV Star (German title: Die Michael Jäger Story – Vom Hooligan zum Serienstar).
- 2008: The Great Taboo – Homosexuality and Football (German title: Das große Tabu – Homosexualität und Fußball).
- 2009: Breaking the Taboo – The New Progress of Homosexuality in Football (German title: Tabubruch – Der neue Weg von Homosexualität im Fußball).
- 2009: Athlete Drinkers – Alcohol in Football (German title: Der Promille-Profi – Alkohol im Fußball).
- 2011: Football is Everything – Even Gay (German title: Fußball ist alles – auch schwul).
- 2011: Tom meets Zizou – Not a Midsummer Night's Drea (German title: Tom meets Zizou – Kein Sommermärchen).
- 2013: Mesut, 17.
- 2013: Trainer!
- 2018: Being Mario Götze.
- 2018: Inside Borussia Dortmund.
- 2020: Like a Stranger - A German Pop Music Story (German title: Wie ein Fremder – Eine deutsche Popmusik-Geschichte).
- 2022: Art is a State of Mind
- 2022: Second Move Kills – 5 years with Jens Spahn (German title: Second Move Kills – 5 Jahre mit Jens Spahn).
- 2025: Fritz Litzmann: A Family Story (German title: Fritz Litzmann, mein Vater und ich)

== Awards ==
- 2008: Felix Rexhausen Prize for The great taboo
- 2010: Adolf Grimme Prize for Tabubruch – Breaking the taboo
- 2010: Alternative Media Prize for Tabubruch – Breaking the taboo
- 2011: FBW: Rated "especially worthwhile" for Tom meets Zizou
- 2012: VDS Television Prize for Tom meets Zizou
- 2013: Best Football Film of all time: Nomination for Tom meets Zizou
- 2013: VDS Television Prize for Trainer!
- 2014: Adolf Grimme Prize: Nomination for Trainer!
- 2018: FBW: Rated "worthwhile" for Being Mario Götze
- 2019: AIPS – International Sport Media Award: Nomination for Being Mario Götze
- 2019: Best German Sport Film for Being Mario Götze
- 2020: ROMY: Nomination for Inside Borussia Dortmund
- 2023: German Television Award: Nomination for Second Move Kills
- 2025: DOK.fest München, VFF-Award: Nomination for Fritz Litzmann: A Family Story
- 2025: FBW: Rated “especially worthwhile” for Fritz Litzmann: A Family Story

== Other engagements ==
- Member of the Deutsche Filmakademie.
- Member of the German Academy for Football Culture.
- Cooperation with DFB - Committees fighting discrimination and racism in soccer.
- Co-author of the DFB brochure about Football and Homosexuality.
- Co-author of the book My First Trip to the Stadium.
