= Awkward Family Photos =

Website featuring embarrassing and humorous photographs among family and friends

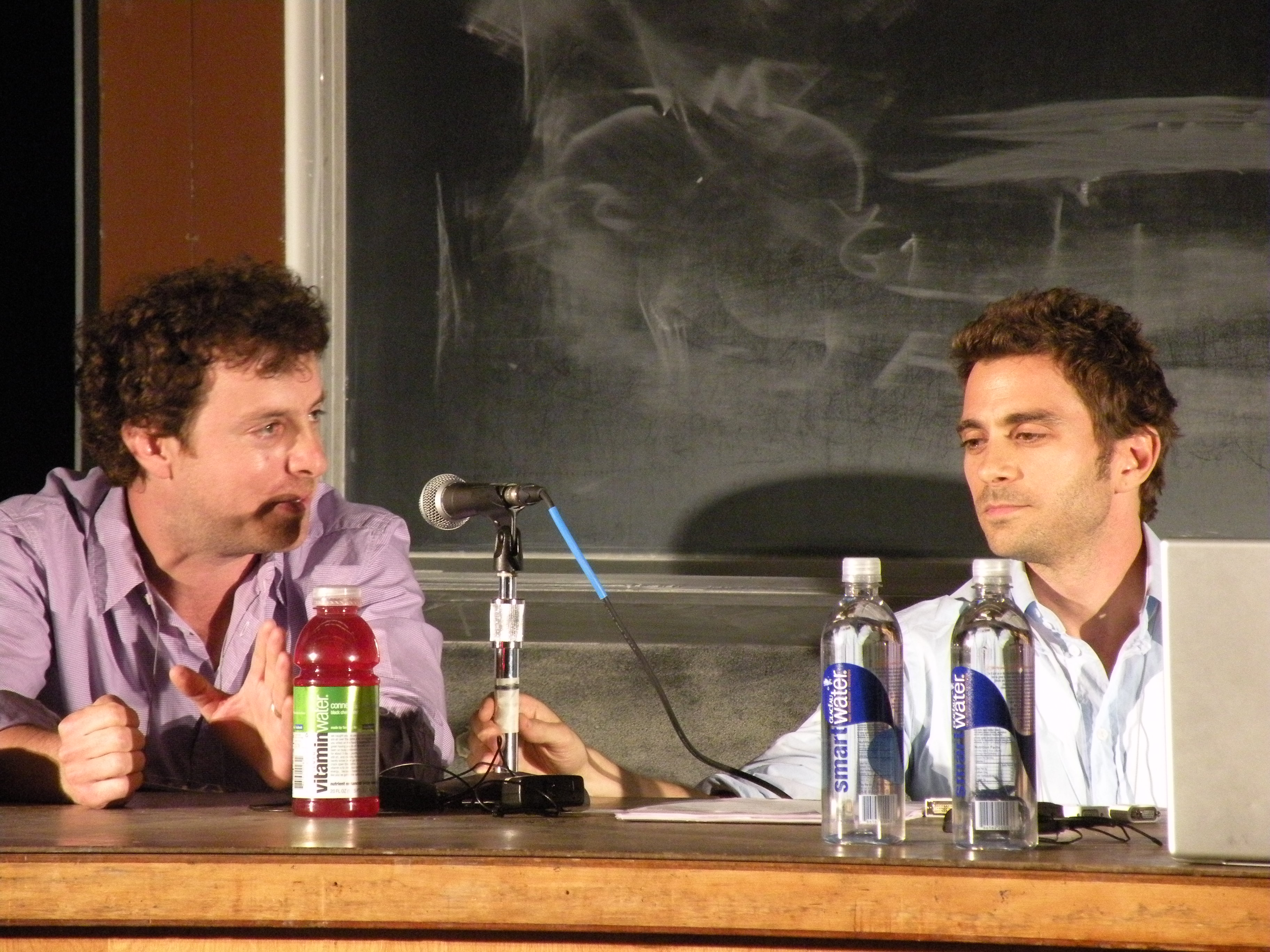
Founders Doug Chernack (left) and Mike Bender at ROFLCon II, 2010

Awkward Family Photos originated as a website in 2009 that featured photographs that captured embarrassing yet humorous moments among family members and friends. Mike Bender, the founder of the company, and his writing partner, Doug Chernack, launched the site early that year, which asked people to submit any awkward photos that they had in their family photo albums. From then on, the site gained much momentum and various products were developed, such as books and games, and an exhibition at ESMoA.

== Origin ==
The idea for Awkward Family Photos was started in 2009 when Mike Bender saw one of his own family photos framed and hung in his parents' house. He mentioned this photo to Doug Chernack, his childhood friend and writing partner, who also acknowledged that he had family photos that were similar. Therefore, they decided to develop a simple webpage for people to share these photos, which rapidly spread across the Internet due to it being shared on the website of a radio station. They received submissions instantly and journalists took note of them from both the New York Times and Time magazine. Awkward Family Photos swiftly became a franchise.

== Books and games ==
Bender and Chernack published their first book in 2010, titled Awkward Family Photos. After this first publication, they continued with several other books, including Awkward Family Pet Photos in 2011, Awkward Family Holiday Photos in 2013, Born to Be Awkward: Celebrating Those Imperfect Moments of Babyhood in 2015, and Everything is Awkward in 2016. Soon after publishing their first book, they began developing board games, such as Awkward Family Photos and The Awkward Family Photos Movie Line Caption Game. Among their standard books and board games, they also have two postcard books, a coloring book for adults, and a day to day calendar for 2019.
