= Eight O'clock =

- 2021 poster for Eight O'Clock
- Directed by: Mostafa Gholami
- Written by: Alireza Taji
- Produced by: Mostafa Gholami; Asghar Abbasi
- Starring: Rahmatollah Shekarkhandeh; Pouya Safdarpour; Amin Heidari; Diba Fallah
- Cinematography: Hamid Pourgholam
- Distributed by: Daria Film
- Release date: 18 October 2021
- Running time: 10 minutes 23 seconds
- Country: Iran
- Language: Persian
- Budget: 1,500 USD

Eight O'clock is a 2021 Iranian short film with a social theme, directed, and co-produced by Mostafa Gholami. The film deals with the social issues of Iranian culture. The film is about an old man named Hamed who returns to his youth due to Alzheimer's disease and comes to propose to his wife. Eight O'clock was nominated for the best film at the up-and-coming Int Film Festival in Hanover, Germany.

== Storyline ==
It tells a love story. This work shows the love of a young man named Hamed to a girl named Niloufar. The main character of the story is an old man named Hamed who is taken care of by his children Saeed and Sara. Hamed returned to his youth due to Alzheimer's disease and proposed to his wife Niloufar. Hamed thinks that his children are Niloufar's brother and sister. His wife died many years ago. In the continuation of the story, his son Saeed wants to take his father to a nursing home due to the ruling problems, but his daughter Sara disagrees with this theory and there are differences between them. At this time, the main event of the story takes place, something that transforms the audience.

== Awards and nominations ==
- Nominated for the best film award at the 16th Hanover Short Film Festival, Germany.
- Qualifying for the quarter-finals for the 10th International Film Festival of "WideScreen" in Toronto, Canada.
- The selected of the 13th International Film Festival of "RNAP" in Brazil.
- The selected of the 13th International Film Festival of "OIBFF" in South Korea.
- The selected of the 6th International Film Festival of "Duemila30" in Italy.
- The Selected of the 5th "ESMoA" International Film Festival in California.
- The Selected of the 9th "First-Time Filmmaker Sessions" International Short Film Festival of England.
