= Return (2019 film) =

RETURN
- 2019 poster for Return
- Directed by: Mostafa Gholami
- Narrated by: Mojtaba Soltani
- Distributed by: Daria Film
- Release date: 21 March 2019
- Running time: 1 minutes
- Country: Iran
- Language: Persian
- Budget: 1,000 USD

Return is a 2019 Iranian short film directed, produced and written by Mostafa Gholami. The minute-long film deals with the issues of organ donation and organ transplantation. At the "Big Syn" film festival in London, it was nominated for the best film from the audience's point of view and won the "special mention award" in the Public Service Announcements. This festival is held every year under the supervision of the United Nations. This film has been screened in 15 international festivals.

== Background ==
Mostafa Gholami created the film to spread awareness and promote the idea of using braindead patients for organ donation.

== Awards and nominations ==
- Getting to the final stage of the 1th "Big Syn" London International Film Festival; and nominated for the best film award from the eyes of the audience; and the winner of the "Special Mention Award" in the "Public Service Announcements".
- Making it to the semi-finals of the 3rd "ESMoA" 60-Second International Film Festival in California.
- The selected of the 8th international Film Festival of 60-second "Mister vorky" in Serbia.
- The selected of the 6th 60-second international film festival "60SIFF" in Pakistan.
- The Selected by the 13th "Grand Off" International Short Film Festival in Poland.
- The selected of the 3rd International Short Film Festival "under 3 minutes in Wirksworth", in England.
- The Selected of the 6th International Women's Short Film Festival Herat "Hiwff" in Afghanistan.
- The Selected for the 7th "First-Time Filmmaker Sessions" International Short Film Festival in England.
- The Selected by the 13th "LABRFF" International Film Festival in Los Angeles.
- The selected of the 1th "Onirica" International Film Festival in Italy.
- The selected for the 1th "New Cinema film & Music Festival" Short Film Festival in United States.
