= Mostafa Gholami =

Iranian director (born 1996)

Mostafa Gholami مصطفی غلامی
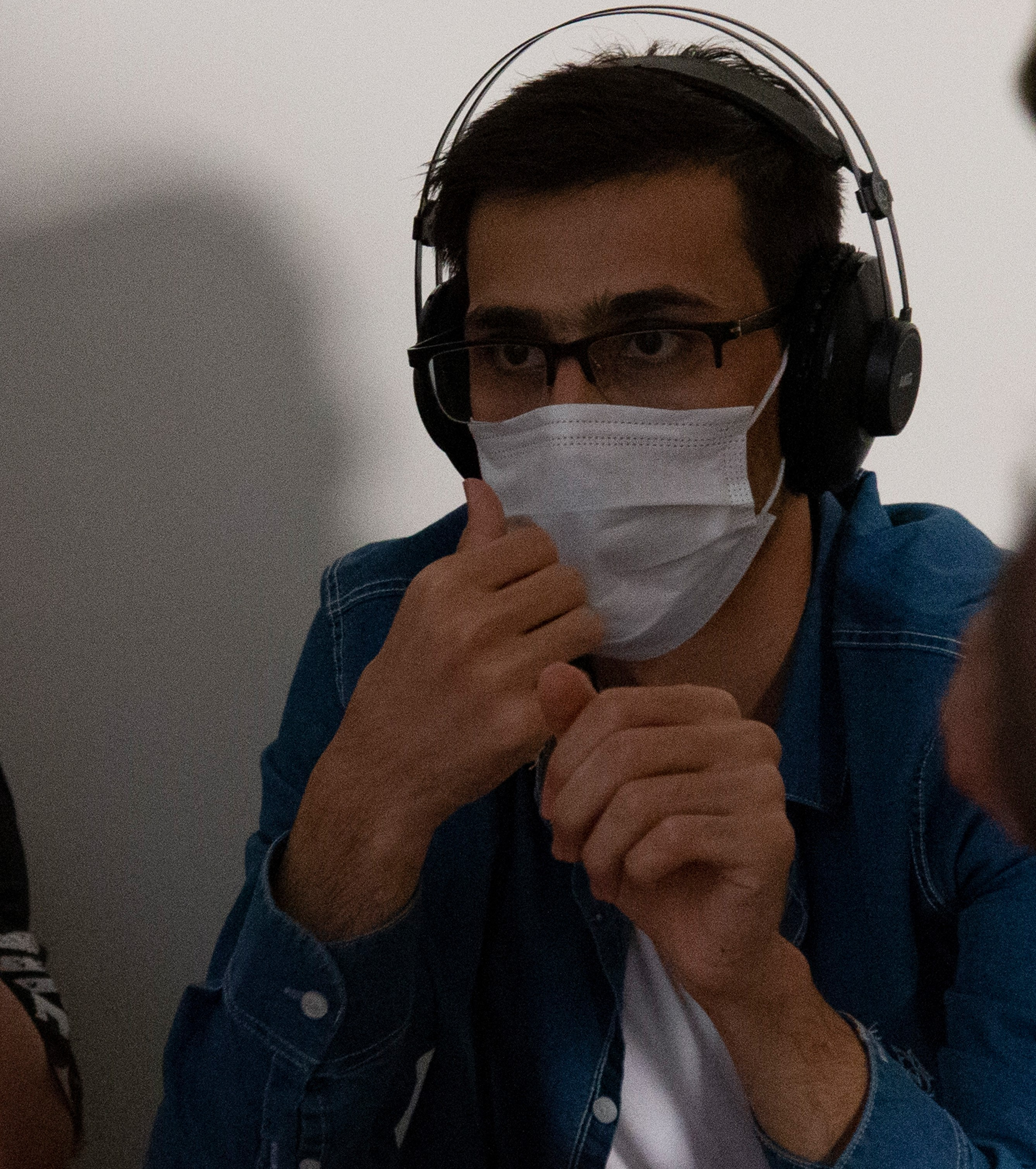
- Gholami in 2021
- Born: 30 July 1996 (age 29); Quchan, Razavi Khorasan province, Iran
- Education: master's degree in cinema directing
- Occupations: Film Director; Producer; Writer; Film Editor
- Years active: 2016–present
- Known for: Eight O'clock; Return
- Awards: Special Mention Award Big Syn
- Website: http://mostafagholami.com/

Mostafa Gholami (Persian: مصطفی غلامی, born 30 July 1996) is an Iranian short film director, writer and producer. He is for the film Return nominated for the best film award from the eyes of the audience and has won a "special mention award" from the "Big Syn" International Festival in London; This festival is held every year under the supervision of the United Nations. He was also for the short film Eight O'clock nominated for the best short film award from the 16th Hanover International Film Festival in Germany.

== Early life ==
Mostafa Gholami, at the age of 13 (in 2010), became interested in the world of cinema and television with the serial Hoosh-e Siah directed by Masoud Abparvar. He started his career in 2016 by making short clips.

== Career ==
Gholami graduated from with a master's degree in cinema directing from Nowshahr University of Art and Architecture.

== Filmography ==
=== FILM ===
| Year | Title | Director | Writer | Producer | Notes |
|---|---|---|---|---|---|
| 2017 | In Yek Tasavvor Nist | Yes | Yes | Yes | Short film |
| 2017 | Shekar Talkh | Yes | Yes | Yes | Short film |
| 2017 | Masir Eshtebah | Yes | Yes | Yes | Short film |
| 2018 | Vesal | Yes | Yes | Yes | Short film |
| 2019 | Return | Yes | Yes | Yes | Short film |
| 2019 | Green Dawn | Yes | Yes | Yes | Short film |
| 2019 | Passerby | Yes | Yes | Yes | Short film |
| 2019 | Flower | Yes | Yes | Yes | Short documentary |
| 2020 | Rich | Yes | No | Yes | Short film |
| 2021 | Eight O'clock | Yes | No | Yes | Short film, also co producer and editor |

== Awards and nominations ==
| Award | Year | Category | Nominated Work | Result | Ref. |
|---|---|---|---|---|---|
| Big Syn International Film Festival London | 2019 | Special Mention Award | Return | Won | |
| Big Syn International Film Festival London | 2019 | Audience Choice of Best Film | Return | Nominated | |
| 16th Hanover International Film Festival | 2021 | Best Film | Eight O'clock | Nominated | |

=== Screening and official selections ===
==== Short Film Eight O'clock ====
- Qualifying for the quarter-finals for the 10th International Film Festival of "WideScreen" in Toronto, Canada.
- The selected for the 13th International Film Festival of "RNAP" in Brazil.
- The selected for the 13th International Film Festival of "OIBFF" in South Korea.
- The selected for the 6th International Film Festival of "Duemila30" in Italy.
- The Selected for the 5rd "ESMoA" International Film Festival in California.
- The Selected for the 9th "First-Time Filmmaker Sessions" International Short Film Festival of England.

==== Short Film Return ====
- Making it to the semi-finals of the 3rd "ESMoA" 60-Second International Film Festival in California.
- The selected of the 8th international Film Festival of 60-second "Mister vorky" in Serbia.
- The selected of the 6th 60-second international film festival "60SIFF" in Pakistan.
- The Selected by the 13th "Grand Off" International Short Film Festival in Poland.
- The selected of the 3rd International Short Film Festival "under 3 minutes in Wirksworth", in England.
- The Selected of the 6th International Women's Short Film Festival Herat "Hiwff" in Afghanistan.
- The Selected for the 7th "First-Time Filmmaker Sessions" International Short Film Festival in England.
- The Selected by the 13th "LABRFF" International Film Festival in Los Angeles.
- The selected of the 1th "Onirica" International Film Festival in Italy.
- The selected for the 1th "New Cinema film & Music Festival" Short Film Festival in United States.
