= Tom Meets Zizou =

Tom meets Zizou – Not a Midsummer Night’s Dream
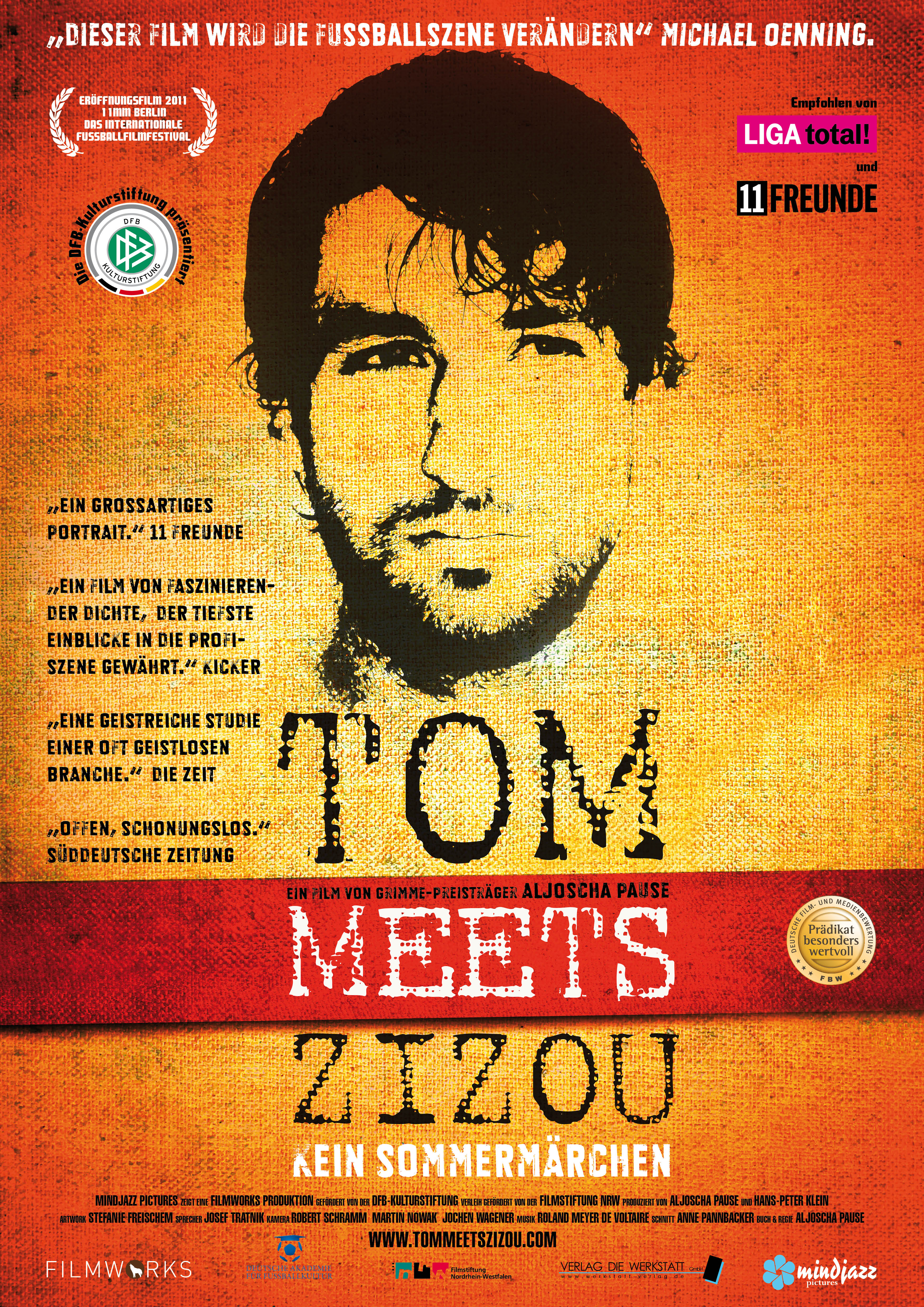
- Directed by: Aljoscha Pause
- Produced by: Hans-Peter Klein; Aljoscha Pause
- Starring: Thomas Broich
- Cinematography: Martin Nowak; Robert Schramm; Jochen Wagener
- Edited by: Anne Pannbacker
- Music by: Roland Meyer de Voltaire
- Distributed by: Mindjazz Pictures
- Release date: 25 March 2011
- Running time: 135 minutes
- Country: Germany
- Languages: German; English

Tom meets Zizou – Not a Midsummer Night's Dream (German title: Tom Meets Zizou – Kein Sommermärchen) is a documentary film by Aljoscha Pause made in 2011. The film deals with the life and career of professional football player Thomas Broich.

== Background and story ==
From 2003 to 2011, Aljoscha Pause made a long-term film documentary about former Bundesliga professional Thomas Broich. It traces Broich's career in the German Fußball-Bundesliga which began promisingly but ended after numerous professional and personal setbacks with a transfer to the Australian club Brisbane Roar in 2010.

The result of some 40 meetings and interviews that generated more than 100 hours of raw footage over eight years, the 135-minute cinema documentary entitled Tom meets Zizou – Not a Midsummer Night’s Dream debuted as the opening film of the 8th International Football Film Festival “11mm” in Berlin on 25 March 2011.

The film was distributed nationwide by mindjazz pictures with an opening date of 28 July 2011. The project enjoyed the support of the DFB Cultural Foundation.

The film was released on DVD and Blu-ray in late 2011 and was screened at international festivals including the International Young Audience Film Festival in Posen, the Thinking Football Film Festival in Bilbao, The CINEfoot Festival in Rio de Janeiro and the Flutlicht Film Festival in Basel (on 1 February 2014 in a double feature with “TRAINER!” on the topic of “Failure”). “Tom meets Zizou” has been translated into English, Polish, Spanish and Portuguese. German broadcaster WDR showed a 90-minute TV version on 21 August 2012.

The film's title is a reference to Broich's former email address, tommeetszizou@aol.com and Broich's then-hero Zinedine Zidane, nicknamed "Zizou".

== Reviews ==
Tom meets Zizou is much more than a documentary. It’s a piece of contemporary history. It’s a close-up, long-term examination like no other. With the best player who never made it to Germany’s national team.

— Bernd Sobolla, Deutschlandradio Kultur

With no frills, like a precision tool, this film traces the searching, the finding, the failing and the getting back up. The camera is always exactly where it needs to be. It surprises, captivates and moves viewers again and again, with every step forward in time that the film shows. And Aljoscha Pause once again delivers a unique portrait that will make long-term changes in the way we see football. This is something he has done before, having made movies about alcohol and homosexuality and how they relate to Germany’s favorite game. And as Jean-Luc Godard said, making a film is a revolutionary act in and of itself.

— Marcel Ahrenholz, Player – The Cinema Mag for Leipzig

It is often said of contemporary football that there are no more “real guys” – no more Netzers, Effenbergs, Baslers. With the departure last summer of Thomas Broich, one of them disappeared from German football quietly and virtually unnoticed. ‘Tom Meets Zizou’ will not disappear.

— Lars-Christian Daniels, Filmstarts.de

An intelligent examination of an industry that can sometimes be dumb. With unexpected twists and turns and several lessons – and a finale that is like a soothing balm. With extraordinary openness, Broich exposes the superficiality and hypocritical sanctimoniousness of the Bundesliga.

— Ronny Blaschke, Die Zeit

An interesting and revealing, mostly chronological portrait of a non-conformist and individualist. But it must be said that the film does not offer a fundamental analysis of the structures of professional football.

— Lexikon des Internationalen Films (International Film Lexicon)

== Awards ==
The film was honored as “especially worthwhile” by the German Film and Media Evaluation institute (Deutschen Film- und Medienbewertung, FBW) for the following reasons:

Director Aljoscha Pause filmed his charismatic und extraordinary protagonist for nearly ten years, documenting the athlete’s highs and lows. Broich’s intelligent and insightful statements reflect not only on himself but on the entire business of football, sometimes bitingly ironic, sometimes disarmingly honest. Just like in a really good game of football, there’s plenty of emotion and excitement here – and not just at the dramaturgically well crafted end of the film.”

— German Film and Media Evaluation

In addition, Tom meets Zizou – Not a Midsummer Night’s Dream was awarded the VDS Television Prize in 2012 (for the 90-minute TV version), and was nominated in 2013 as the “best football film of all time.”
