= Otto Hahn Peace Medal =

German peace prize

Otto Hahn Peace Medal in Gold
- Awarded for: Outstanding services to peace, tolerance and international understanding
- Presented by: United Nations Association of Germany, LV Berlin-Brandenburg (DGVN)
- Website: https://www.dgvn.berlin/ohfm/

The Otto Hahn Peace Medal in Gold is named after the German nuclear chemist and 1944 Nobel Laureate Otto Hahn, an honorary citizen of Berlin.

The medal is in memory of his worldwide involvement in the politics of peace and humanitarian causes, in particular since the dropping of the atomic bombs on Hiroshima and Nagasaki in August 1945 by the United States Army Air Forces.

It was established by his grandson Dietrich Hahn in 1988 and is awarded by the United Nations Association of Germany (Deutsche Gesellschaft für die Vereinten Nationen, DGVN, Berlin-Brandenburg) to persons or institutions that have rendered "outstanding services to peace and international understanding". By tradition, the gold medal, together with a leather-bound diploma inlaid in gold, is presented in Berlin at a biennial ceremony on 17 December by the Governing Mayor of Berlin and the President of the DGVN.

On 17 December 1938, in Berlin-Dahlem, Otto Hahn and his assistant Fritz Strassmann discovered a new reaction in uranium (which exiled Lise Meitner and her nephew Otto Frisch two weeks later correctly interpreted as "nuclear fission") thus laying the scientific and technical foundations of nuclear energy. This 17 December 1938 therefore marks the beginning of the Atomic Age, which from the scientific, political, economic, social and philosophical point of view has fundamentally changed the world.

== Previous prizewinners ==
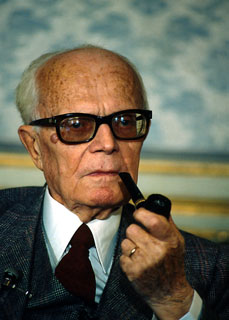
Sandro Pertini

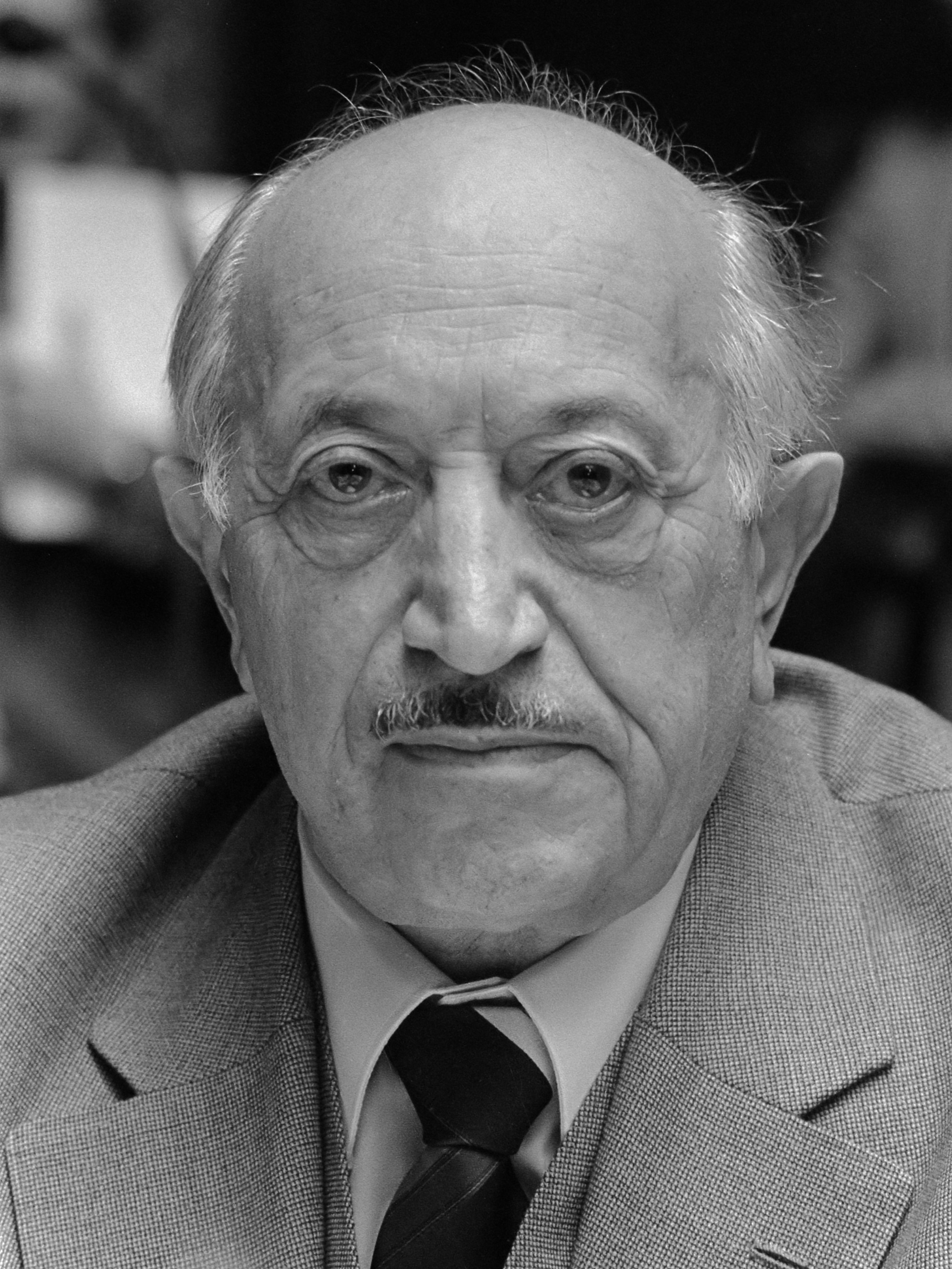
Simon Wiesenthal

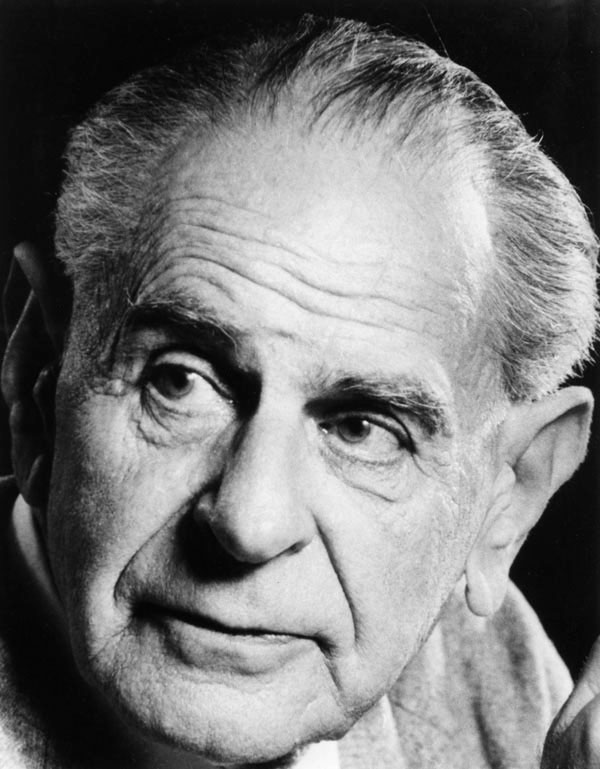
Sir Karl Popper

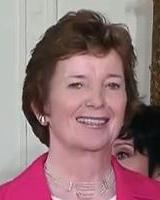
Mary Robinson

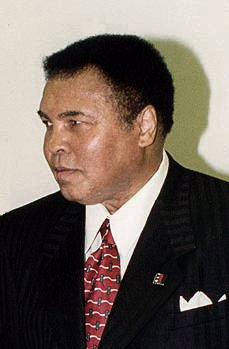
Muhammad Ali

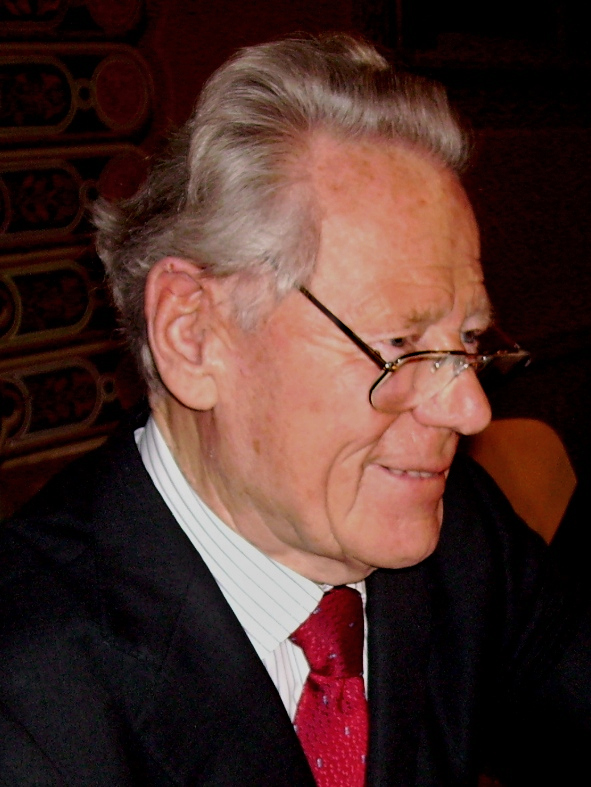
Hans Küng

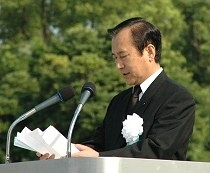
Tadatoshi Akiba

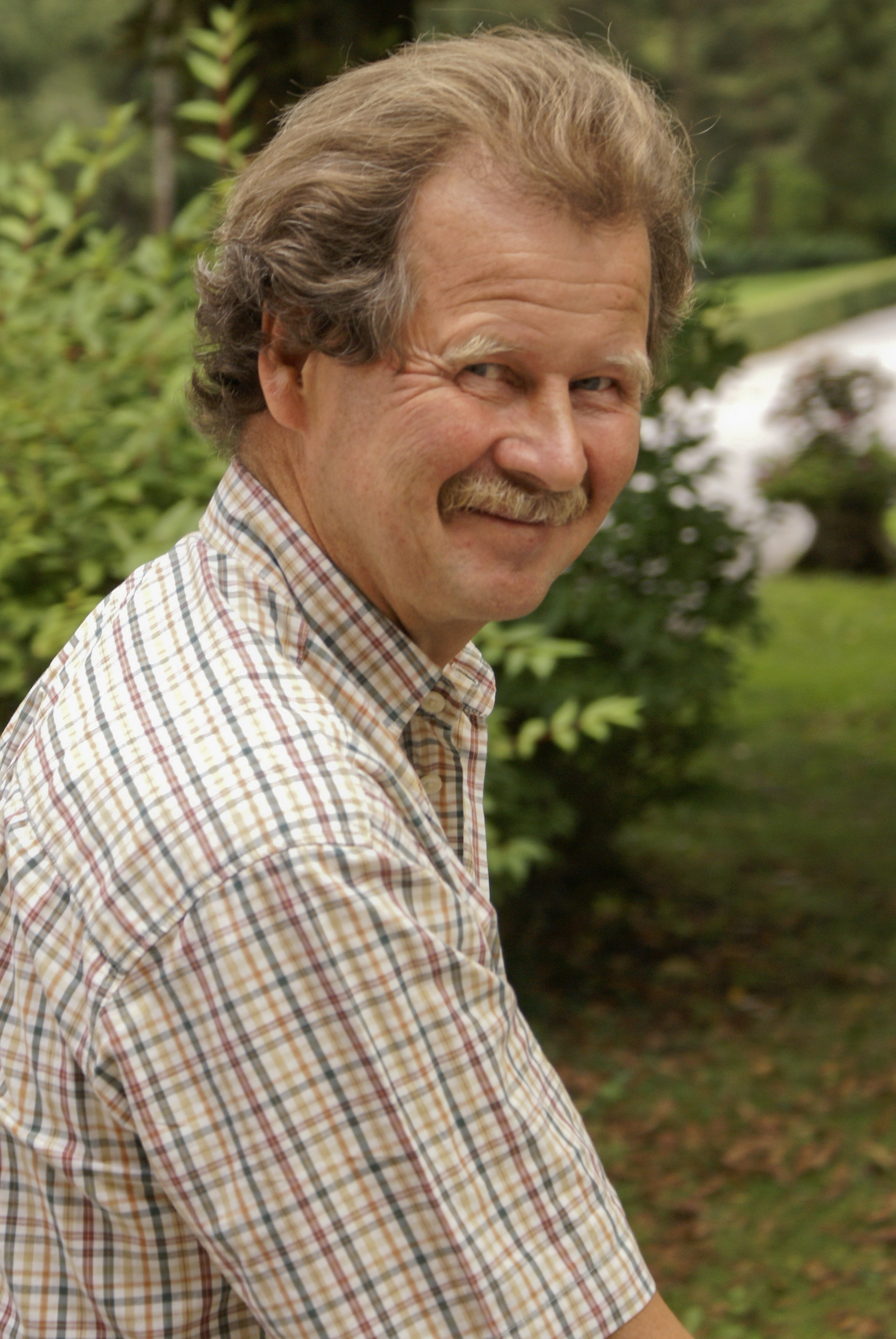
Manfred Nowak

- 1988: Sandro Pertini – Italian politician, former President of the Republic of Italy, Rome, "for outstanding services to peace and international understanding, especially for his political ethics and practical humanity."
- 1989: Mikhail Gorbachev – Russian politician, President of the Union of Soviet Socialist Republics, Moscow, "for outstanding services to peace and international understanding, especially for his contributions to nuclear disarmament of the great powers and the creation of a fundamentally new political order in Europe."
- 1991: Simon Wiesenthal – Austrian writer and founder of the Jewish Documentation Centre, Vienna, "for outstanding services to peace and international understanding, especially for his exemplary work for truth and justice, dignity and tolerance, and for reconciliation."
- 1993: Sir Karl R. Popper – British philosopher and theoretician of science, Kenley near London, "for outstanding services to peace and international understanding, especially for his achievements in social philosophy, which laid the theoretical foundations for the humane evolution of democratic societies."
- 1995: Hans Koschnick – German politician (SPD) and EU Administrator in Mostar, Bosnia-Herzegovina, Bremen, "for outstanding services to peace and international understanding, especially for his humanitarian efforts in Bosnia-Herzegovina, which demonstrate in exemplary fashion how personal responsibility for the peace mission of the United Nations should be exercised."
- 1997: Lord Yehudi Menuhin – British violin virtuoso and conductor, London, "for outstanding services to peace and international understanding, especially for his unwavering and exemplary belief, demonstrated in his life, that music is in all circumstances a force for understanding and for peace."
- 1999: Gerd Ruge – German journalist and television documentary maker, Munich, "for outstanding services to peace and international understanding, especially for his commitment to the encouragement of objective reporting and for his exemplary work in promoting a better understanding of China, the Soviet Union and Russia."
- 2001: Miriam Makeba – South African singer, composer and human rights activist, Johannesburg, "for outstanding services to peace and international understanding, especially for her decades of opposition to racism and apartheid in South Africa, which made her a role model in the struggle for human rights, human dignity and tolerance."
- 2003: Mary Robinson – Irish politician, former President of the Republic of Ireland and UN High Commissioner for Human Rights, Dublin, "for outstanding services to peace and international understanding, especially for her political leadership, which was marked by high humanitarian ideals, and her tireless and courageous efforts for the worldwide promotion and defence of human rights."
- 2005: Muhammad Ali – US American boxer, civil rights campaigner and UN Messenger of Peace, Berrien Springs, "for outstanding services to peace and international understanding, especially for his lifelong commitment to the American civil rights movement and the cultural and spiritual emancipation of black people throughout the world."
- 2008: Hans Küng – Swiss theologian, founder and President of the Global Ethic Foundation (Stiftung Weltethos), Tübingen, "for outstanding services to peace and international understanding, especially for his exemplary employment for humanity, tolerance and the dialogue between the great world religions."
- 2010: Daniel Barenboim – Argentinian, Israeli, Palestinian and Spanish pianist, conductor and UN Messenger of Peace, Berlin, "for outstanding services to peace and international understanding, especially his exemplary commitment to the dialogue in the Middle East and the approximation between Israel and Palestine."
- 2012: Tadatoshi Akiba – Japanese mathematician, politician, former mayor of Hiroshima and co-founder of the Mayors for Peace Organization, Hiroshima, "for outstanding services to peace and international understanding, especially his untiring dedication to worldwide nuclear disarmament and the policy of détente and reconciliation."
- 2014: Manfred Nowak – Austrian University teacher and international law and human rights expert, Vienna, "for outstanding services to peace and international understanding, especially for his tireless efforts to protect the rights of each individual and the courageous publication of cruel abuses."
- 2016: Melinda Gates – American businesswoman, philanthropist and co-founder of the Bill & Melinda Gates Foundation, Seattle, "for outstanding contributions to peace and understanding among nations, especially regarding her admirable philanthropic initiatives that prepare the ground for millions of people in all continents for a humane life."
- 2018: John Kerry – 68th United States Secretary of State, Boston, "for his exceptional diplomatic achievements."

== Statements by prizewinners ==
"The award of the Otto Hahn Peace Medal has given me great joy and satisfaction, particularly because it is linked with the name of this great man, a great scientist, and a modest human being who was ready to help other people at all times, and who has always been a role model for me." (Prof. Dr. h.c. Simon Wiesenthal, Vienna, 1991).

"Ever since my early youth, I have admired Otto Hahn as a scientist and a human being. The reason for Hahn's peace work was simply that, knowing more than other citizens about atomic weapons, he felt it his duty to speak about this issue that was so crucial for mankind. He could make things clear, he had to use his knowledge. And it is why Otto Hahn, with atomic weapons in mind, wrote shortly before his death of the 'necessity of world peace'." (Prof. Dr. Sir Karl R. Popper, Kenley, 1993).

"Otto Hahn held a particular attraction for us younger people after the war. In his commitment to the promotion of free scientific enquiry, as well as in his efforts to persuade scientists to recognize their responsibility for shaping the contemporary world and the future, we found something which we could identify. And when in the fifties he came out so strongly and impressively against the misuse of nuclear science for aggressive purposes, we looked upon him as an example to us all. Another reason for the admiration we felt for Otto Hahn was that he never ceased to remind us of our duty to think not only of ourselves, and not only of the developed world, but of the world as a whole." (Dr. h.c. Hans Koschnick, Bremen, 1995).

"Otto Hahn was a fantastic man, who gives us all an example of humanity, also in the nazi era." (Prof. Dr. h.c. Lord Yehudi Menuhin, London, 1997).

"I wish to express my thanks on behalf of my husband. This award is very important to Muhammad. He feels very honoured to be the winner of the tenth Otto Hahn Peace Medal. Both Otto Hahn and Muhammad worked in professions that had destructive effects – but both worked tirelessly for peace. We warmly thank the United Nations Association of Germany, Berlin-Brandenburg, for honouring Muhammad's commitment. He will continue to devote every effort to his activities as United Nations Messenger of Peace and to his work within the Muhammad Ali Center for Peace and International Understanding." (Dr. Lonnie Ali, Berrien Springs, 2005).

== See also ==
- Not to be confused with the much more often awarded scientific Otto Hahn Medal nor the new Otto Hahn Prize created by a merger of two similar prizes.
- List of prizes named after people
- List of peace prizes
