= Gerd Ruge =

German journalist, author, and filmmaker (1928–2021)

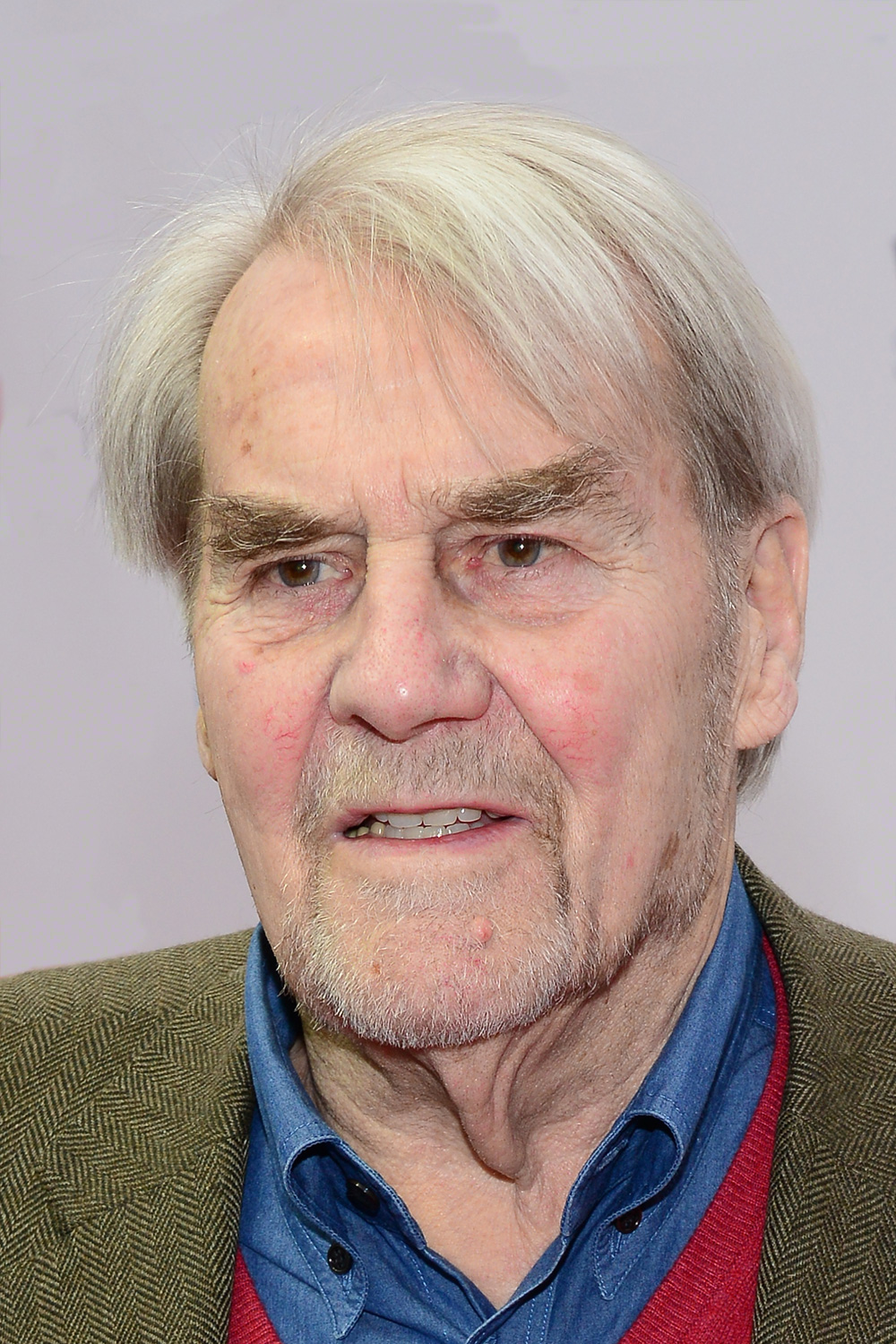
- Ruge in 2014
- Born: 9 August 1928; Hamburg, Germany
- Died: 15 October 2021 (aged 93); Munich, Germany
- Occupations: Journalist; author; filmmaker; academic teacher
- Organizations: Nordwestdeutscher Rundfunk (NWDR); ARD; WDR; Amnesty International; University of Television and Film Munich
- Awards: Bambi Awards; Goldene Kamera; Otto Hahn Peace Medal; Order of Merit of the Federal Republic of Germany

Gerd Ruge (9 August 1928 – 15 October 2021) was a German journalist, author and filmmaker. As a journalist he was associated with public broadcasters Nordwestdeutscher Rundfunk (NWDR), ARD and WDR. Through his career spanning over 50 years, he reported from many countries including the former Soviet Union, China, the United States, and Afghanistan. He was the first German journalist with a visa to work in Yugoslavia, and the first correspondent for national television ARD in Moscow. He was ARD correspondent in the U.S. from 1964 and 1969, where he reported after the assassination of both Martin Luther King Jr. and Robert F. Kennedy. Ruge summarised his reports in books such as Sibirisches Tagebuch ("Siberia Diary") and Russland: Portrait eines Nachbarn ("Russia: Portrait of a Neighbour") and Unterwegs: politische Erinnerungen ("On the way: political memories")

Ruge co-founded the German chapter of Amnesty International in 1961. He was professor of television journalism at Munich's University of Television and Film. He received awards for journalism, peace movement and national merit including the Commander's Cross of the Order of Merit of the Federal Republic of Germany in 2014.

== Biography ==
Ruge was born in Hamburg on 9 August 1928 to a physician. He started his writing career writing for a youth magazine, Benjamin in 1946. His career in journalism began in 1949 at the Hamburg based public broadcaster NWDR. The following year, he became the first German journalist with a visa to work in Yugoslavia. He was the first news correspondent for the German national television broadcaster ARD in Moscow from 1956 until 1959 and served as the ARD correspondent in the United States between 1964 and 1969, becoming the chief political correspondent for ARD in 1970.

During his time in Moscow in the late 1950s, he met Russian author Boris Pasternak in a small town outside Moscow, and the two would become close friends, with Ruge even naming his own son Boris after the author. Pasternak however, would fall out of favour with the Kremlin, having to return his Nobel prize for literature. Ruge left the country two days prior to being deported. He received a 12 year entry ban into the Soviet Union for having helped Pasternak financially. In 1968, Ruge was in the United States, and reported after the assassination of American senator Robert F. Kennedy whom he had known personally. During the same period, he also reported from Memphis, Tennessee, after the assassination of civil rights leader Martin Luther King Jr. He also reported on the Apollo 11 mission launch from the Kennedy Space Center in Florida in 1969.

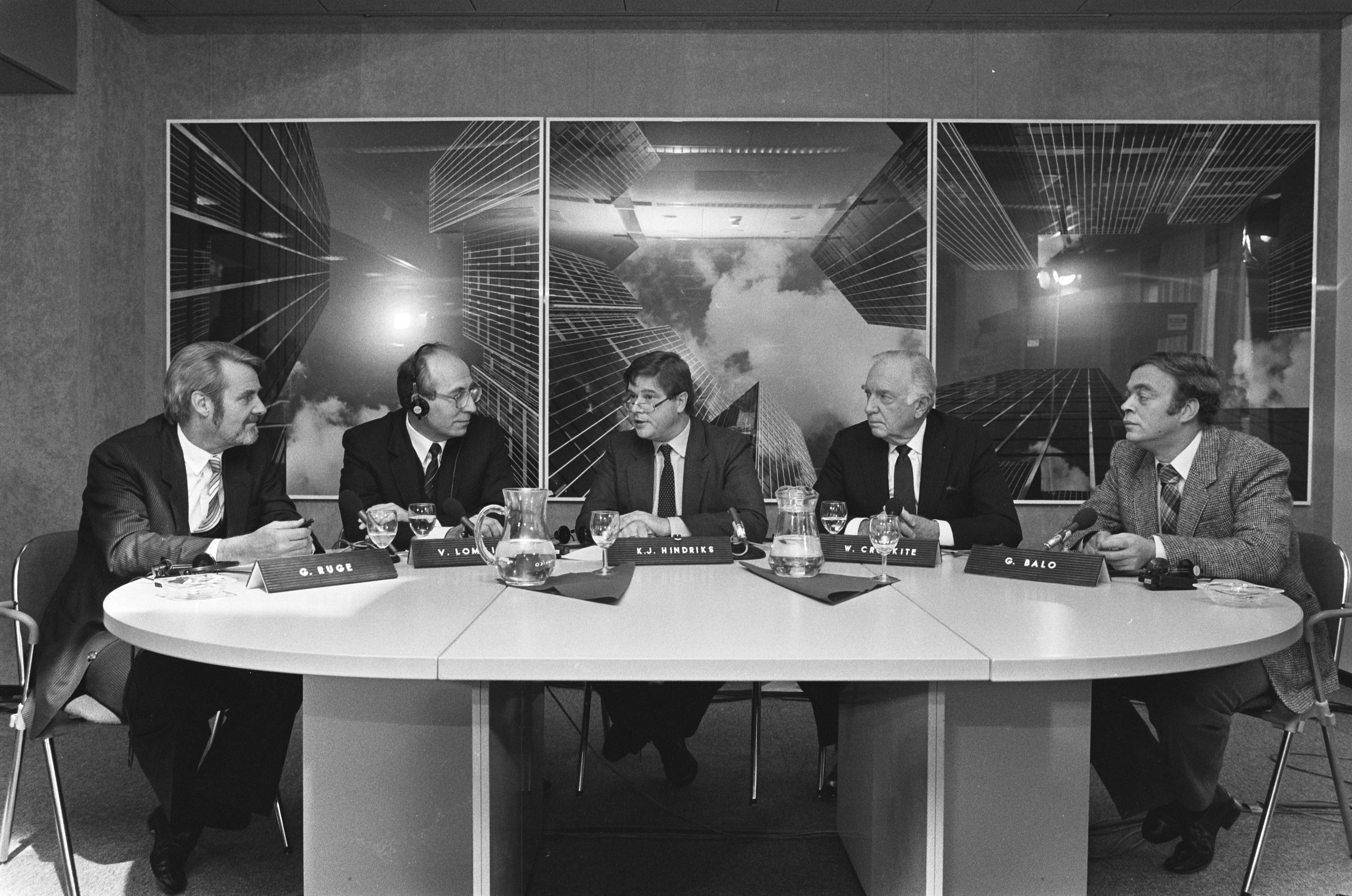
Ruge (left) on a TV panel with Walter Cronkite in 1985

In the early 1970s, he moved to Bonn as the station director of the Bonn based public broadcaster WDR. From 1973 until 1976 he reported for German newspaper Die Welt from Beijing. In this period, some of his articles on Chinese foreign policies in the context of the cold war between the United States and the Soviet Union were published in The New York Times. He was also a guest lecturer at Harvard University during this time. He subsequently worked for ARD and WDR in various roles, including as head of the ARD Studios in Moscow from 1987 until 1993. During this time, he reported on the end of the cold war and the dissolution of the Soviet Union. He was close to the Soviet leader Mikhail Gorbachev, who had called him a person of high moral values. During the Soviet coup d'état attempt in August 1991, he reported for over 72 hours broadcasting the resistance which saw Gorbachev holding on against the uprising from opponents of his reforms.

Ruge retired from ARD in September 1993. Writing about his retirement, the German newspaper Der Spiegel called him one of the few distinctive reporters in Germany, and noted the calm explanatory tone that he brought to his reports. Between 1997 and 2001, he taught as a professor of television journalism at Munich's University of Television and Film and set up a new chair for television journalism at the institute in 1998.

Along with fellow journalists Felix Rexhausen and Carola Stern, Ruge founded the German chapter of Amnesty International in Cologne in 1961. In 1963, he and Klaus Bölling started the ARD programme Weltspiegel. From 1981 to 1983 he was the moderator of the ARD magazine programme Monitor. He and Helmut Markwort moderated the 3sat discussion programme NeunzehnZehn. The programme is now called Ruge NeunzehnZehn and moderated by Nina Ruge (no relation). In the late 1980s, he also served as the executive director of the Alerdinck Foundation for East-West Communications, an organisation that aimed to foster communications between journalists from the eastern and western blocs during the cold war. He was also a member of the PEN Centre Germany, an association of German writers.

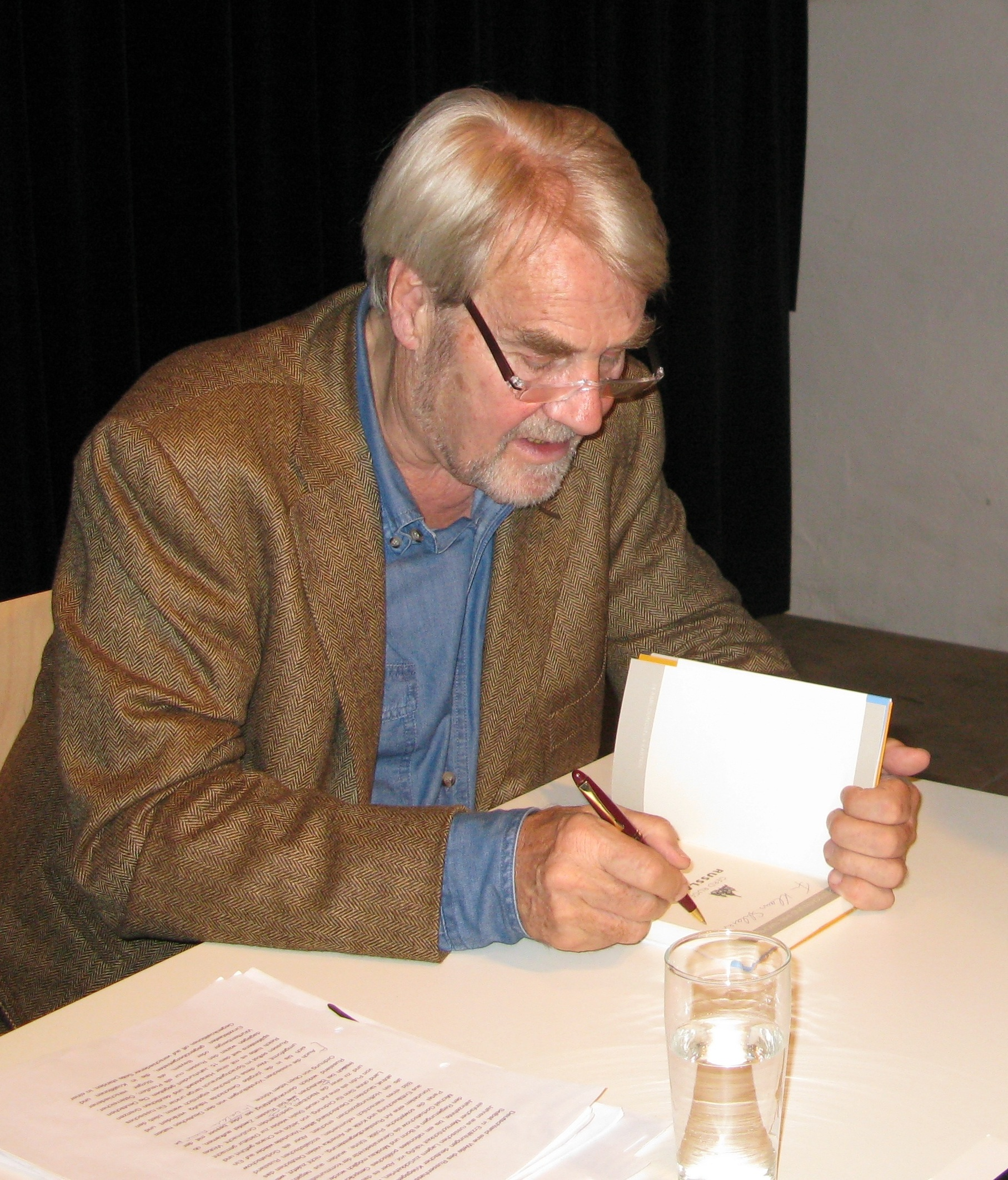
Ruge at a book signing event in Langenau (2008)

Ruge was also noted for his travel reports and foreign dispatches. Through his work, he was known for his precise interviews, complex analyses, and the ability to explain complex topics including foreign relationships in an easily comprehensible form. His travel reports from multiple places including the Russian countryside, the civil rights movement from the United States, or from a traffic-jam in Moscow, were noted to have authentically captured the mood of the people on the ground. He was known to start his travel reports with the locals with a simple question seeking "Und, wie ist das Leben?" ("And, how is life?") Explaining his laid-back style of reporting, he would emphasise that the journalist need not put himself in the foreground to tell the story.

Ruge published a collection of his articles as his political memoirs in 2013, titled Unterwegs: politische Erinnerungen ("On the way: political memories") named after his travel documentary series. He had earlier written biographies of Russian writer Boris Pasternak in 1959 and of Mikhail Gorbachev in 1991. He also wrote a book on Russia titled Russland: Portrait eines Nachbarn ("Russia: Portraits of a Neighbour") in 2012.

The Gerd Ruge Scholarship (worth €100,000) has been awarded to makers of documentaries since 2002 in partnership with the Film- und Medienstiftung NRW ("Film and Media Foundation NRW"). Ruge presided over the panel of judges for the awarding of the grant for documentary filmmakers. Ruge was awarded the Otto Hahn Peace Medal in 1999 and the Commander's Cross of the Order of Merit of the Federal Republic of Germany in 2014, among others.

== Personal life ==
Ruge was first married to Fredeke Countess von der Schulenburg, the daughter of a member of the German resistance Fritz-Dietlof von der Schulenburg. The couple had two children, daughter Elisabeth Ruge, who became a publisher and literary agent, and son Boris Ruge (born 1962), a German diplomat. Ruge later married author Lois Fisher. His third marriage was to Munich-based journalist Irmgard Eichner whom he married in 1992 in Moscow. The couple lived in Munich after his retirement. Eichner predeceased him by six months. He also had a beach house in Cyprus where he would spend two months every year.

Ruge died in Munich on 15 October 2021 at the age of 93.

== Important reports ==
- 1968: Following the assassination of Martin Luther King Jr.
- 1968: Following the assassination of Robert F. Kennedy
- 1991: Four days in August, during the coup in Moscow
- 1998: Gerd Ruge in China
- 2003: Gerd Ruge in Afghanistan

== Awards ==
- 1964: Gold Adolf Grimme Prize for the TV series The Third Reich
- 1969: Silver Adolf Grimme Prize for TV report on the murder of Robert Kennedy
- 1970 and 1971: Bambi Awards
- 1991: Goldene Kamera
- 1992: Adolf Grimme Prize "Special Honor"
- 1993: Staatspreis des Landes Nordrhein-Westfalen
- 1994: Bayerischer Fernsehpreis (Sonderpreis) for his reports as ARD correspondent in Moscow
- 1999: Otto Hahn Peace Medal (in Gold)
- 2001: Hanns Joachim Friedrichs Award, named after journalist Hanns Joachim Friedrichs
- 2014: Commander's Cross of the Order of Merit of the Federal Republic of Germany

== Books ==
- Pasternak: A Pictorial Biography, McGraw Hill,1959, OCLC 1079425321
- Michail Gorbatschow, biography, S. Fischer Verlag, Frankfurt am Main, 1990, ISBN 3-10-068506-7
- Weites Land. Erfahrungsberichte, Berlin Verlag, Berlin, 1996, ISBN 3-426-60750-6
- Sibirisches Tagebuch, travel account, Berlin Verlag, Berlin, 1998, ISBN 3-8270-0300-8
- Russland: Portrait eines Nachbarn, C.H. Beck, 2012, ISBN 978-3-406-63324-9
- Unterwegs. Politische Erinnerungen. Carl Hanser Verlag, Berlin 2013. ISBN 978-3-446-24369-9
