= Felix Rexhausen =

German journalist, editor, and author

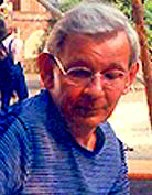
- Rexhausen c. 1984.
- Born: 31 December 1932; Cologne, Germany
- Died: 6 February 1992 (aged 59); Hamburg, Germany
- Other name: Stefan David
- Occupations: Magazine editor, journalist, author
- Notable credit(s): WDR, Cologne Stadtanzeiger

Felix Rexhausen (31 December 1932 – 6 February 1992) was a German journalist, editor and author. As a journalist, he wrote for Kölner Stadt-Anzeiger, Westdeutscher Rundfunk, and the magazines Die Zeit and Der Spiegel.

== Biography ==
Rexhausen lived in Leipzig and Hamburg during his childhood. He studied Economics at the University of Cologne, where he finished 1959. He then worked as an editor for the Westdeutscher Rundfunk in Cologne, and later was a journalist for Kölner Stadt-Anzeiger, Der Spiegel and Die Zeit. Together with Carola Stern and Gerd Ruge, Rexhausen founded the German chapter of Amnesty International in 1961. After 1968, Rexhausen worked as an author in Hamburg, writing novels, satires and lyric poetry. One of his themes is homosexuality. Rexhausen died on 6 February 1992 in Hamburg.

The German National Lesbian and Gay Journalists Association has given an award for journalists who write on LGBT topics since 1998. The name of the award is the Felix-Rexhausen-Award after Rexhausen, who was gay.

== Works ==
The literary scholar Benedikt Wolf has compiled a comprehensive bibliography of Rexhausen's works. It contains 398 works by Felix Rexhausen as well as sources of secondary literature.

- Der Unternehmer und die volkswirtschaftliche Entwicklung, Berlin 1960.
- Die Finanzpublizität der Länder und Gemeinden, Berlin 1963.
- Mit Bayern leben, Offenbach am Main 1963.
- Der linkische und der Weg zum Rechts-Staat oder Wer zersetzt hier was?, Cologne 1965.
- Mit deutscher Tinte, Frankfurt a.M. 1965.
- Lavendelschwert, Frankfurt a.M. 1966.
- Gedichte an Bülbül, Stierstadt i.Ts. 1968.
- Die Sache, Frankfurt/M. 1968.
- Berührungen, Darmstadt, 1969 (under alias Stefan David).
- Seelenadel, Zweibrücken, 1969 (with Axel Hertenstein).
- Von großen Deutschen, Stierstadt i.Ts., 1969
- Germania unter der Gürtellinie, Bern, 1970
- Spukspaßspitzen, Pforzheim 1970, (with Axel Hertenstein)
- Wie es so geht, Düsseldorf, 1974
- So und so, Leverkusen, 1976
- In Harvestehude, Hamburg, 1979
- Die Lavendeltreppe, Düsseldorf, 1979
- Über Wahlkampf, Luzern, 1980
- Beste Fahrt!, Ottersberg, 1981
- Gesammelte Werke, Berlin
  - Band 1: Die Märchenklappe: allerlei Zwischenmännlichkeiten; Geschichten, Mären, Reime, 1982
- Der heutige Homosexuelle und Weihnachten, Kiel, 1987
- Die deutsche Weihnacht, Munich, 1989
- Zaunwerk. Szenen aus dem Gesträuch. Edited from the estate by Benedikt Wolf. Berlin 2021 (Typescript finished in 1964)
