= Detlef Grumbach =

German journalist (born 1955)

Detlef Grumbach (born 1955 in Detmold) is a German author and journalist.

== Life ==
After school Grumbach worked as a journalist. Topics of his works are literary critic, LGBT, sexuality, AIDS and events in life of people. Grumbach wrote as journalist articles for different German newspapers (such as Die Zeit, Die Woche, Deutsches Allgemeines Sonntagsblatt, Süddeutsche Zeitung, Hannoversche Allgemeine, Frankfurter Rundschau, Berliner Zeitung and taz). Grumbach wrote radio features over Martin Dannecker, Lion Feuchtwanger, Christian Dietrich Grabbe, Christian Geissler, Hermann Kesten, Richard Plant, Uwe Timm and Feridun Zaimoglu. As author Grumbach wrote several books. He lives in Hamburg.

== Selected works ==
- Die Linke und das Laster. Schwule Emanzipation und linke Vorurteile. Hamburg 1995. ISBN 3-928983-30-X
- Was heißt hier schwul. Politik und Identitäten im Wandel. Hamburg 1997. ISBN 3-928983-54-7
- Over the Rainbow. Ein Lesebuch zum Christopher-Street-Day. Hamburg 2001. ISBN 3-928983-94-6
- "... und nichts als nur Verzweiflung kann uns retten". A book to Christian Dietrich Grabbe (1801–1836). Aisthesis-Verlag 2001
- Genossenschaften. Engagierte Gemeinschaften für Unabhängigkeit, Qualität und gesellschaftliche Innovation, with drawings by Tom Krüger. Berlin 2006. ISBN 978-3-937683-08-9
- Schwule Nachbarn. 22 Erlebnisse. Hamburg 2007. ISBN 978-3-939542-02-5

== Awards ==
- 1999: Felix-Rexhausen-Award
