= Felix-Rexhausen Award =

The Felix-Rexhausen Award were created 1998 by the Bund Lesbischer und Schwuler JournalistInnen (the German affiliate of NLGJA – the National Lesbian and Gay Journalists Association) to recognize and honor the mainstream media for their fair, accurate and inclusive representations of the LGBT community and the issues that affect their lives.

The Felix-Rexhausen Award is presented annually. It is named in memory of Felix Rexhausen, a German, gay writer. It is presented to an individual who has made a significant difference in promoting equal rights for the LGBT community.

== Winners ==
- 2018: Johannes Nichelmann for his radio contribution Taboo topic Bisexuality: The stigma of being attracted to women and men (1 February 2018 in Deutschlandfunk Kultur – Zeitfragen)
- 2017: Laura Döing and Olga Kapustina for their radio feature Fight and Flight – The Story of Kirill and Jonathan (30 May 2016 in SWR 2 – Tandem)
- 2016: Peter Gerhardt for his television feature Gleiche Liebe, Falsche Liebe?!? – Homophobie in Europa (broadcast on 12 May 2015 on Arte ); non-monetary special prize for Steffen Jan Seibel and Tania Witte for their Zeit-Online column on Andersrum ist auch nicht besser
- 2015: Charlotte Funke and Anne Bohlmann for their radio report "Homework is gay!" - Sexual diversity in school (broadcast on 18 October 2014 on cultural radio RBB); non-monetary special prize for YouTube portrait series Queer through Germany - How young lesbians, gays, bisexuals and trans* people grow up today
- 2014 Monika Mengel: radio feature "'Und wir nehmen uns unser Recht' – 40 Jahre neue Lesbenbewegung" (WDR5, 14 January 2014)
  - Special award for Thomas Pfaff: radio feature "19. September 1963: Sendung der WDR-Glosse 'Mit Bayern leben' von Felix Rexhausen" (Zeitzeichen, WDR5, 19 September 2013)
- 2013 Claus Bredenbrock: TV documentary "Des Kaisers schmutzige Wäsche" (ZDF/Arte 2013)
  - Special award for Stefanie Fetz and Max Muth: article "Die Geisterspiele" (Franz Josef – Magazin der deutschen Journalistenschule, September 2012)
- 2012
  - Jobst Knigge: TV documentary "Der Aids-Krieg" (Das Erste, 16. November 2012)
  - Special award for TV programme "Ich bin schwul – Tobi steht auf Jungs" (Neuneinhalb – Das Check-Eins-Nachrichtenmagazin, 15 October 2011, Das Erste)
- 2011 Steffi Illinger: TV documentary "Traditionsbewusst, heimatverbunden, schwul – Eine ganz normale bayerische Volkstanzgruppe" (Bayerisches Fernsehen, Vor Ort – Die Reportage2, 5 October 2010)
- 2010
  - Günter Frorath, Michael Lohse and Roger Willemsen: radio programme "Er sucht ihn – Männerliebe literarisch" (Radio WDR5, SpielArt, 14 February 2010)
  - Special award for Sarah Stricker; article "Die wollen mich fertigmachen" (Frankfurter Allgemeine Sonntagszeitung: 30 August 2009)
- 2009
  - Christine Schön: radio feature "Nachhall – Junge Lesben suchen nach ihrer Geschichte" (SWR 2: 15 April 2009) and Frank Stocker: article "Wenn Liebe nur finanzielle Nachteile bringt" (Welt am Sonntag: 22 February 2009)
  - Special award for Andreas Völlinger: articles "Schwule Hasen und echte Mädels" and "Voll schwule Superhelden" (Comicgate.de)
- 2008 Aljoscha Pause: TV documentary "Das große Tabu – Homosexualität und Fußball" (DSF)
- 2007
  - Ted Anspach: TV documentary "Homosexualität – genetisch bedingt?" (arte)
  - Special award for Kerstin Kilanowski: radio feature "Tanz auf der Grenze – Was ist Mann, was ist Frau?" (WDR 3)
- 2006
- Martin Reichert: article "Adieu Habibi"
- (taz: 29 July 2006)
- 2005
- Hatice Ayten: TV documentary "Out of Istanbul"
- (arte: 30 August 2005)
- 2004
- Lorenz Wagner: article "Goldrausch in Gelsenkirchen"
- (Financial Times Deutschland: 28 May 2004)
- 2003
- Valentin Thurn: TV movie "Mein Papa liebt einen Mann"
- (Film series "37 Grad" on German TV channel ZDF: 22 July 2003)
- 2002
- Rosvita Krausz: radio feature "Leb wohl mein Herzensschöner – Nachruf auf eine schwule Liebe"
- (Sender Freies Berlin: 28 April 2002)
- 2001
- Martina Keller: radio feature "Ich liebe dich, Daddy!" about homosexuality in Namibia
- (Deutschlandfunk: 30 January 2001)
- 2000
- Die Lesbisch-Schwule Presseschau: institutional for great engagement
- 1999
- Karin Jurschik: article "Es gibt nichts, worüber wir nicht reden könnten"
- (Cologne monthly magazine "StadtRevue")
- and Detlef Grumbach: radio feature "Bürger wider Willen – die Schwulen-Bewegung zwischen Revolte und Integration"
- (Deutschlandfunk)
- 1998
- Thomas Rombach and Jürgen Kolb: radio feature "Der süddeutsche Sängerkrieg oder Heidelberger Rosa Kehlchen versus Badischer Sängerbund"
- (radio magazine "Radio Sub" on station Radio X in Frankfurt, Germany)

== See also ==
- List of LGBT-related awards
- GLAAD Media Award
- Rainbow Awards
