= Stephan Schmidt (footballer) =

German footballer

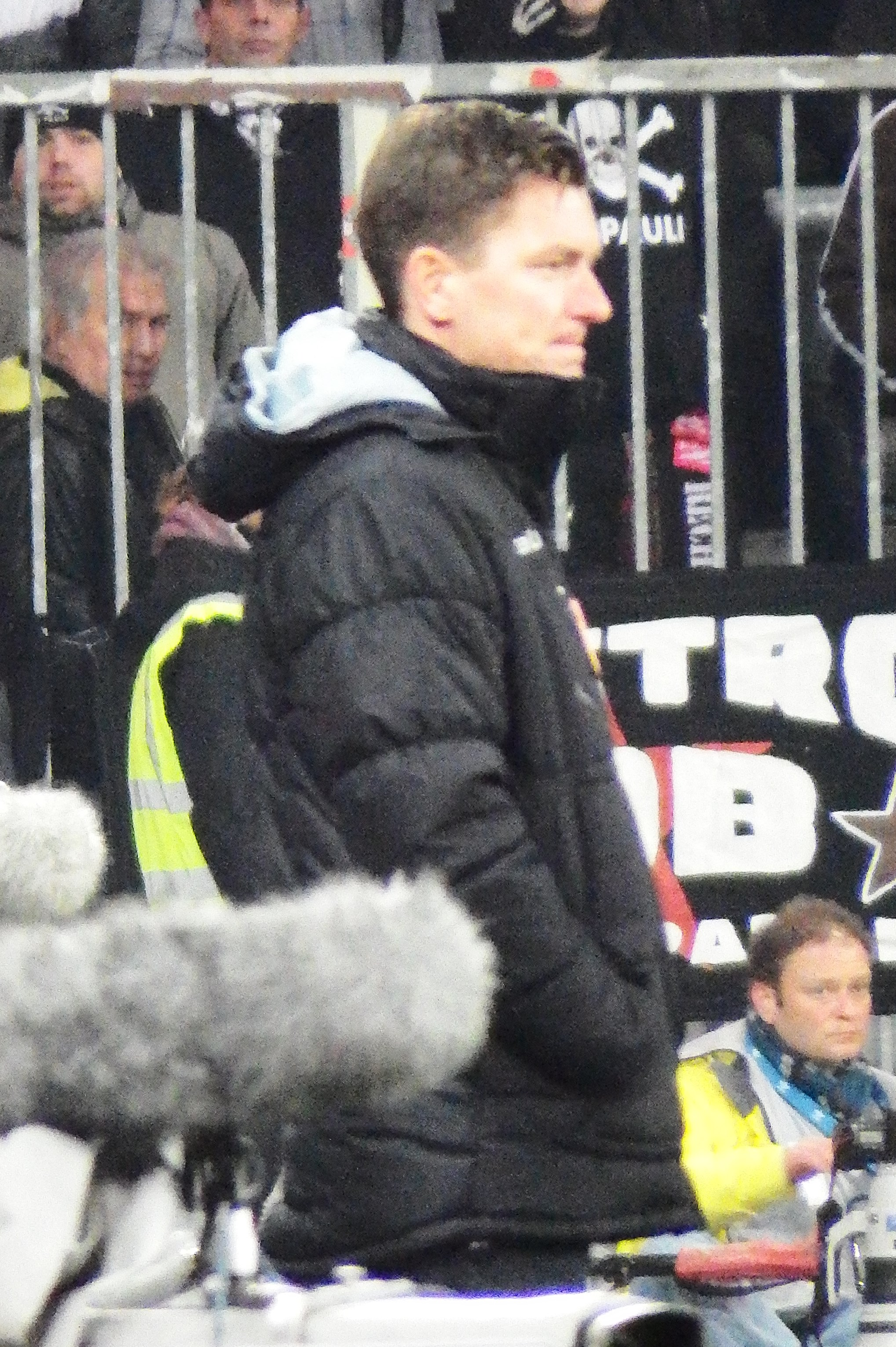
- Schmidt in 2013

Personal information
- Full name: Stephan Schmidt
- Date of birth: 19 August 1976 (age 50)
- Place of birth: West Berlin, West Germany
- Height: 1.86 m (6 ft 1 in)
- Position: Midfielder

Youth career
- BFC Preussen
- –1994: Hertha Zehlendorf
- 1994–1995: Reinickendorfer Füchse

Senior career*
Years	Team	Apps	(Gls)
1995–1998	Reinickendorfer Füchse	75	(7)
1998–2000	SV Babelsberg 03	57	(2)
2000–2002	SC Preußen Münster	65	(0)
2002–2003	SV Babelsberg 03	26	(1)
2003–2005	Hertha BSC II	49	(7)
2005–2007	Tennis Borussia Berlin	38	(4)
Total		310	(21)

Managerial career
- 2012–2013: SC Paderborn 07
- 2013–2014: Energie Cottbus
- 2017: Würzburger Kickers
- * Club domestic league appearances and goals

Stephan Schmidt (born 19 August 1976) is a German professional football coach and former player.

== Coaching career ==
Schmidt was hired by Energie Cottbus on 6 November 2013 and given a contract to 2015. He was sacked on 24 February 2014 after getting a point from nine matches.

He was appointed as the head coach of Würzburger Kickers for the 2017–18 season. On 2 October 2017, he was sacked.

== Coaching record ==
As of 30 September 2017

Managerial record by team and tenure
Team	From	To	Record					
Team	From	To	G	W	D	L	Win %	Ref.
Paderborn 07	10 July 2012	5 May 2013	33	10	9	14	30.30	
Energie Cottbus	6 November 2013	24 February 2014	9	0	1	8	0.00	
Würzburger Kickers	1 July 2017	2 October 2017	14	4	4	6	28.57	
Total			56	14	14	28	25.00	—
