= Frank Wormuth =

German footballer and manager

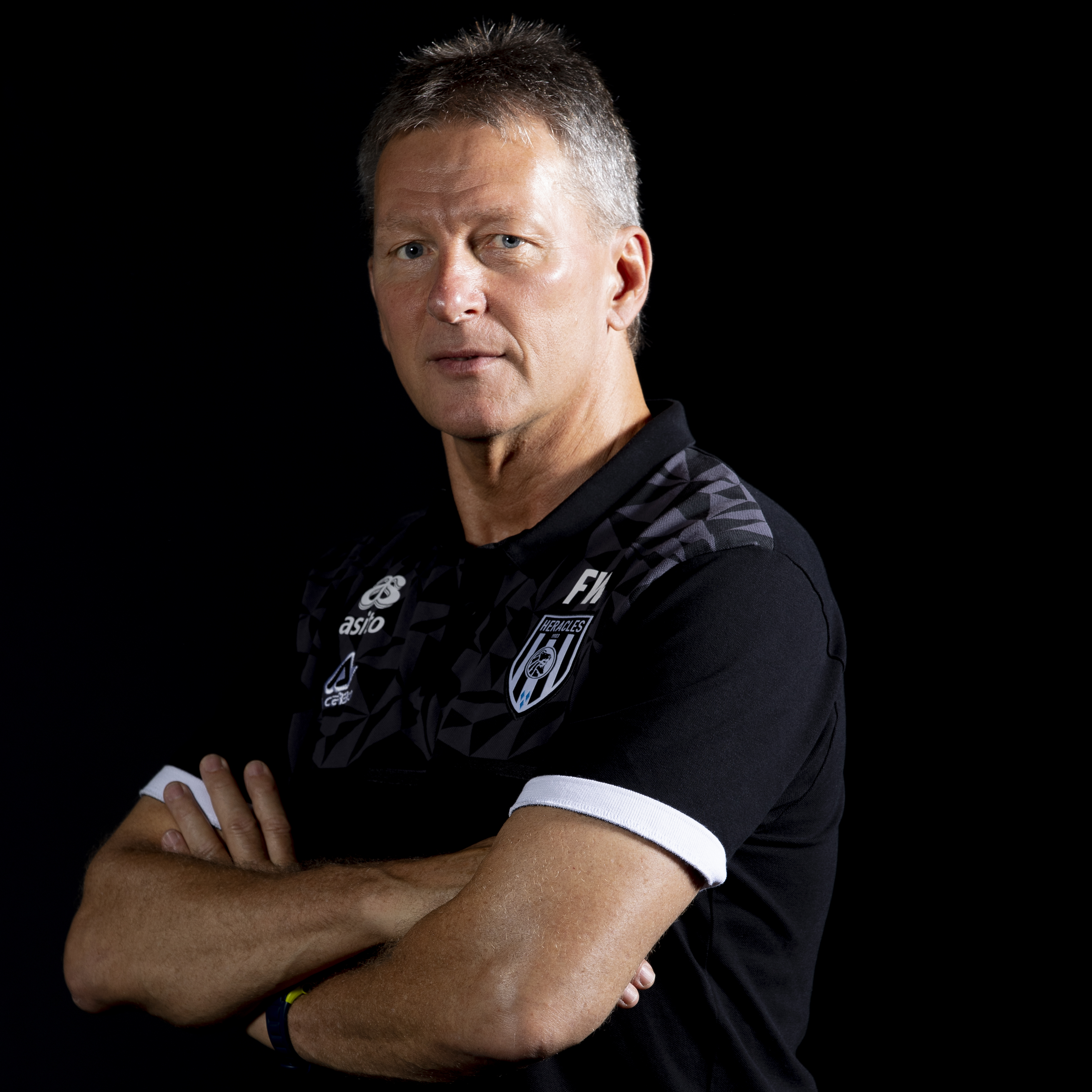
- Wormuth as a manager of Heracles Almelo in 2021

Personal information
- Full name: Frank Wormuth
- Date of birth: 13 September 1960 (age 66)
- Place of birth: West Berlin, West Germany
- Height: 1.87 m (6 ft 2 in)
- Position: Defender

Senior career*
Years	Team	Apps	(Gls)
1982–1983	SC Freiburg	24	(1)
1983–1986	Hertha BSC	70	(1)
1986–1989	Freiburger FC	77	(11)

Managerial career
- 1999–2001: SC Pfullendorf
- 2002–2003: SSV Reutlingen
- 2004: Union Berlin
- 2005–2006: VfR Aalen
- 2008–2018: Germany U-20
- 2018–2022: Heracles Almelo
- 2022: FC Groningen
- 2023: Indonesia (Technical director)
- * Club domestic league appearances and goals

Frank Wormuth (born 13 September 1960) is a German football manager.
