= ESMoA =

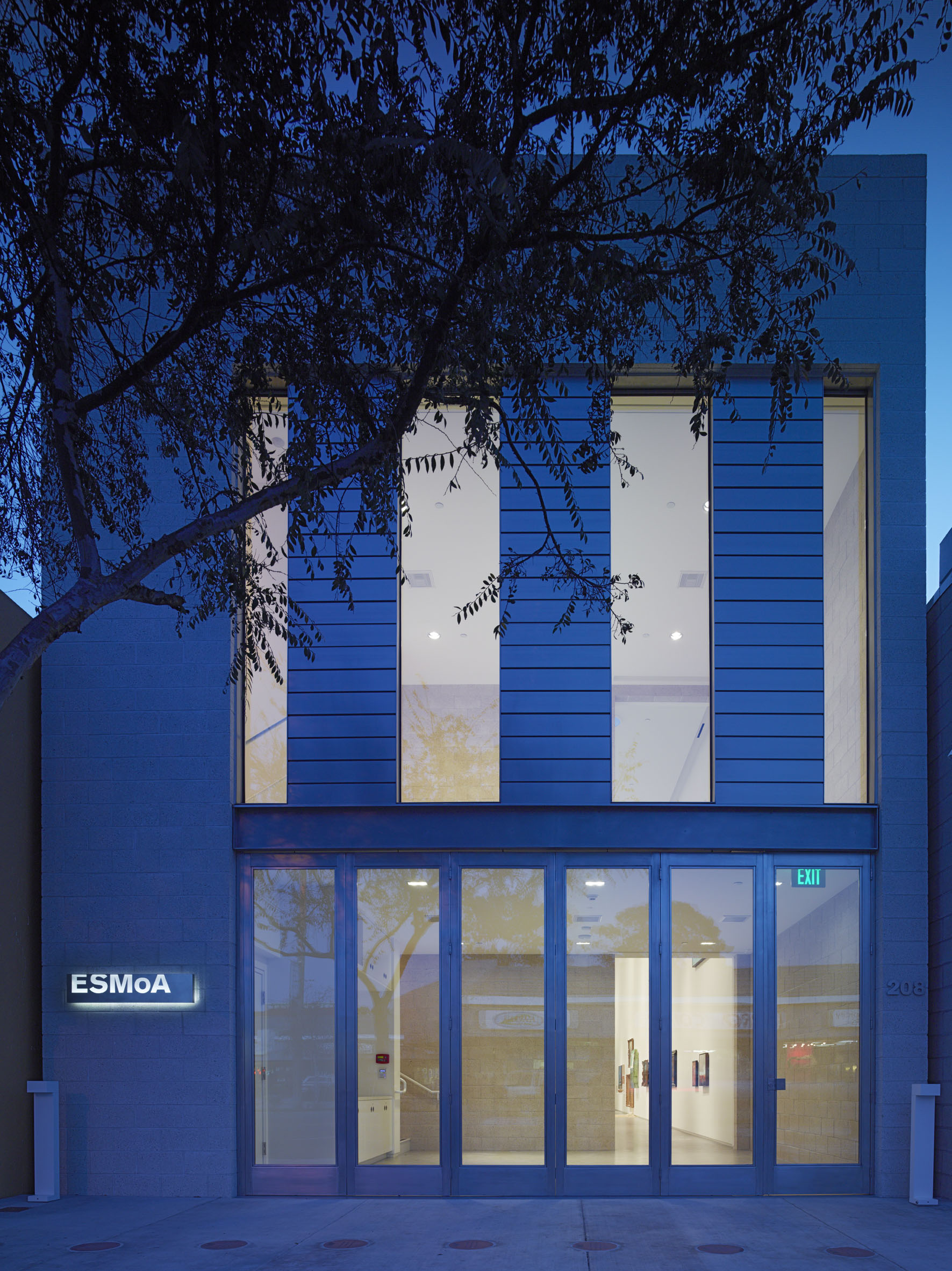
- Former site of ESMOA in El Segundo

- Location within the Los Angeles metropolitan area
- Former name: El Segundo Museum of Art
- Established: 2013
- Location: Lawndale, California, US
- Coordinates: 33.895°N 118.353°W
- Type: Art museum
- Website: www.esmoa.org

ESMoA, also known as the Experimentally Structured Museum of Art, is a museum located in Lawndale, California, US. It was founded in 2013 in El Segundo, California, by Eva Sweeney, Brian Sweeney and Bernhard Zünkeler, and is run by Artlab21 Foundation, a nonprofit 501(c)(3) founded by the Sweeneys. Its stated mission is to reimagine creativity through the display and education of visual arts. ESMoA has offered three "Experiences" per year, presenting a variety of experiences including sculpture, painting, works on paper, performances, and photography, organised by theme and concept rather than chronologically. ESMoA uses the terms Transdisciplinary, International, Dynamic and Open.

ESMoA provides art education for students, families, and adults, with free admission. These activities included school programs, drawing workshops, art talks, lectures, family days, cooking, yoga and dance classes, and movie nights.

== History ==
Artlab21 Foundation, a non profit 501(c)(3) public charity, is the operator of ESMoA. In 2011, two fine art exhibitions were held at the old El Segundo Fire Station, followed by plans for the construction of a permanent art laboratory, known as ESMoA, in the heart of downtown El Segundo. In January 2013, ESMoA opened as a functional and experimental art space with a focus on education.

ESMoA was built in a previously vacant lot in the restaurant district of downtown El Segundo. In October 2014 it was listed by Artnet News as being one of America's Top 10 Private Contemporary Art Museums. As of 2024, the museum is based in nearby Lawndale.

== Experiences ==
ESMoA's exhibitions are known to the public as Experiences, a term chosen to imply experiencing art rather than reading a label in a traditional museum setting. ESMoA uses innovative art display methods unlike most museums, displaying art by theme, with exhibit works across centuries and from all materials. The themes that ESMoA used in its first 10 Experiences were environment (DESIRE), nudity (TRUTH), fame (FAME), political (Cuban) conflict (STING), abstraction (SILENCE), street art (SCRATCH), architecture and art in the home (HOME), creative process (SPARK), artist workplace (STUDIO), and the LA art scene (TOUCH).

== Outside experiences ==
ESMoA also created Experiences in the community. In the first three years ESMoA organized an oceanfront installation on El Segundo Beach (ANTI-ARK), a one-day body painted installation (OBJECTIFIED), a competition of Elvis Presley's impersonators (ELVIS WHO?), a video projection on the tower facade of El Segundo High School (PRIDE CONSTELLATION) and two still standing murals on the former El Segundo Post Office and former El Segundo Fire station (PHYTOMAGNETIC and FIREWATER).

== Partnerships ==
ESMoA has made collaborative partnerships with other Los Angeles museums. The Getty Research Institute curated SCRATCH and displayed 18 of its rare books, pairing them with LA graffiti artists to explore the theme of artist collaboration over the past five centuries.

ESMoA paired with The Wende Museum for the FAME Experience to explore the ambivalent soul of Los Angeles.

The Experience SPARK explored the collaboration between world known writer Cornelia Funke and the multiplatform storytelling company Mirada Studios.

The Los Angeles County Museum of Art (LACMA) curated the STUDIO Experience, exhibiting the work of Norbert Tadeusz in the United States for the first time.

Edward Goldman, art critic and host of KCRW’s “Art Talk” curated TOUCH, showing the Los Angeles art scene over the last four decades including portraits of artists in their studios by photographer Jim McHugh and a selection of original artworks by these artists like Carlos Almaraz, John Baldassari, David Hockney, Ed Moses, Noah Purifoy, Ed Rusha, Alison Saar, Patssi Valdez and many more.

ESMoA is in discussion with these museums and others regarding future projects and has been selected to participate in the upcoming Pacific Standard Time: LA/LA project, organized by the Getty Foundation.

== ESMoA experience information ==
Although ESMoA does not provide labels next to the art on display, visitors can gather information through four different learning tools:

ESMoA Virtual Gallery Grid. Each artwork is associated with a number on the floor. iPads in the gallery space provide visitors with the ESMoA Virtual Gallery Grid, a simple numbered grid containing basic information about the art piece, such as title, artist, date, material and size and a link to learn more about the artist or art movement. Additionally, every number in the Grid contains a question to encourage visitors to think outside the box and leave a comment in the system. The ESMoA Virtual Gallery Grid is also available on ESMoA's website.

ESMoA Education Specialists. During open hours Education Specialists are present to answer questions.

ESMoA Experience Library. There are tables and chairs in the gallery where visitors can sit and consult the books on artists or artistic movements on display.

Scavenger Hunt. For each Experience ESMoA Education Specialists organise scavenger hunts related to it.

== ESMoA programs ==
School programming - ESMoA educators have developed age-tailored programs and classes. School students are invited to sketch the art pieces and create their own piece of art inspired by it using materials such as clay, paper or water color pencils.

Adult programming – ESMoA teams with dining and drinking establishments to host events for adults. Evening programs may include talks, cooking classes, workshops, performances, and screenings.

Family programming – Family Fun is held on some Sundays at ESMoA, with free programming led by its art educators for creativity and enjoyment. Programs may include tours, family activities, sketching, and scavenger hunts.

== ESMoA artist-in-residence program ==
There is a full artist's work-live studio on the second floor of the ESMoA building. This Artist-in-Residence (AIR) space contains living quarters and a studio where artists can create works. Artists living in the space can collaborate with ESMoA staff and visitors on artistic projects.

For the choice of artist in residence candidates, ESMoA established cooperation with Otis College of Art and Design (Spring period) and with London's Royal Drawing School (Summer period).

In the first two years, the ESMoA Artist-in-Residence Program hosted artists from Germany, Iceland, Taiwan, Cuba, Lithuania, the United Kingdom, France, and South Korea.

== Art is a State of Mind ==
The six-part documentary series Art is a State of Mind by german filmmaker Aljoscha Pause unfolding over the course of nine years follows Bernhard Zünkeler, co-founder of ESMoA, artist and curator. Pause documents Zünkeler's journey establishing the ESMoA art lab and various artist collectives.
