= 2022–23 Heracles Almelo season =

Heracles Almelo
2022–23 season
- Chairman: Bart Haverland
- Head coach: John Lammers
- Stadium: Erve Asito
- Eerste Divisie: 1st
- KNVB Cup: Second round
- Top goalscorer: League: Emil Hansson (9); All: Emil Hansson (9)
- All statistics correct as of 19 November 2022.

The 2022–23 season is the 120th season in the history of Heracles Almelo and their first season back in the second division of Dutch football. The club are participating in the Eerste Divisie and the KNVB Cup. The season covers the period from 1 July 2022 to 30 June 2023.

== Players ==
As of 5 January 2023

Note: Flags indicate national team as defined under FIFA eligibility rules; some limited exceptions apply. Players may hold more than one non-FIFA nationality.

No.	Pos.	Nation	Player
1	GK	NED	Michael Brouwer
2	DF	NED	Sylian Mokono
4	DF	GER	Sven Sonnenberg
5	DF	GER	Marco Rente
7	FW	TUR	Bilal Başaçıkoğlu
8	MF	BEL	Elias Sierra
9	FW	ITA	Antonio Satriano
10	MF	MAR	Anas Ouahim
11	FW	DEN	Nikolai Laursen
12	DF	NED	Ruben Roosken
14	DF	BEL	Héritier Deyonge
15	MF	BEL	Lucas Schoofs
17	MF	NED	Thomas Bruns
18	MF	NED	Marko Vejinović
19	DF	SUR	Navajo Bakboord

No.	Pos.	Nation	Player
20	MF	DEN	Kasper Lunding
21	DF	NED	Justin Hoogma
22	DF	CRO	Mateo Leš
23	FW	CUW	Rigino Cicilia
24	FW	GER	Abdenego Nankishi (on loan from Werder Bremen)
25	DF	GHA	Robin Polley
26	GK	NED	Koen Bucker
27	MF	TUR	Melih İbrahimoğlu
28	GK	NED	Robin Jalving
29	FW	SWE	Emil Hansson
32	MF	NED	Sem Scheperman
33	FW	SWE	Samuel Armenteros
34	DF	NED	Chiel Olde Keizer
36	GK	NED	Timo Jansink
—	FW	BEL	Ismail Azzaoui

== Pre-season and friendlies ==
Win Draw Loss Fixtures

8 July 2022 Friendly	SC Verl (Germany)	3–1	(Netherlands) Heracles Almelo	Verl, Germany
18:30 CEST (UTC+2)	Probst 52' (pen.); Akono 64'; Wolfram 65'	Report	Armenteros 18' (pen.)	Stadium: Sportclub Arena

9 July 2022 Friendly	Preußen Münster (Germany)	1–2	(Netherlands) Heracles Almelo	Billerbeck, Germany
13:00 CEST (UTC+2)	Wooten 20'; Ghindovean (red card) 55'	Report	Bakış 12'; Hansson 80'	Stadium: Sportzentrum Helker Berg

15 July 2022 Friendly	Sparta Rotterdam (Netherlands)	1–0	(Netherlands) Heracles Almelo	Delden
16:00 CEST (UTC+2)	Van Crooij 14'	Report		Stadium: Sportpark Voetbalvereniging Rood Zwart

22 July 2022 Friendly	Heracles Almelo (Netherlands)	2–1	(Netherlands) Excelsior	Almelo
18:00 CEST (UTC+2)	Bakış 54'; Armenteros 81'	Report	Goudmijn 85'	Stadium: Erve Asito

29 July 2022 Friendly	Heracles Almelo (Netherlands)	1–3	(Netherlands) NEC	Almelo
19:00 CEST (UTC+2)	Laursen 48'	Report	Marques 28', 76'; Duelund 90'	Stadium: Erve Asito

30 July 2022 Friendly	Heracles Almelo (Netherlands)	5–0	(Netherlands) De Treffers	Almelo
13:00 CEST (UTC+2)	Scheperman 5'; Bakış 20', 83'; Besselink 44', 47'	Report		Stadium: Erve Asito

4 December 2022 Friendly	Cambuur (Netherlands)	1–1	(Netherlands) Heracles Almelo	Leeuwarden
13:30 CET (UTC+1)	Rodrigues 6'		Scheperman 65'	Stadium: Cambuur Stadion

== Competitions ==
=== Overall record ===
Competition	First match	Last match	Starting round	Final position	Record							
Competition	First match	Last match	Starting round	Final position	Pld	W	D	L	GF	GA	GD	Win %
Eerste Divisie	August 2022	May 2023	Matchday 1	Winners	38	27	4	7	103	42	+61	71.05
KNVB Cup	18 October 2022	12 January 2023	First round	Second round	2	0	1	1	2	3	−1	0.00
Total					40	27	5	8	105	45	+60	67.50

Source: Soccerway

=== Eerste Divisie ===
==== League table ====
Pos	Team	Pld	W	D	L	GF	GA	GD	Pts	Promotion or qualification
1	Heracles Almelo (Note: Winner of the First and Fourth Period (Rounds 1–10 and 29–38)) (C, P)	38	27	4	7	103	42	+61	85	Promotion to the Eredivisie
2	PEC Zwolle (Note: Winner of the Second Period (Rounds 11–19)) (P)	38	27	4	7	99	43	+56	85	Promotion to the Eredivisie
3	Almere City (Note: Winner of the Third Period (Rounds 20–28)) (O, P)	38	21	7	10	58	41	+17	70	Qualification for promotion play-offs
4	Willem II	38	19	11	8	68	40	+28	68	Qualification for promotion play-offs
5	MVV Maastricht	38	18	5	15	65	65	0	59	Qualification for promotion play-offs

Source: Soccerway, Keuken Kampioen Divisie (in Dutch)
Rules for classification: Season in progress: 1) Most points won; 2) Less points lost; 3) Goal difference; 4) Goals scored; 5) Alphabetical order; End of season: 1) Points; 2) Goal difference; 3) Goals scored; 4) Head-to-head points; 5) Head-to-head goal difference; 6) Head-to-head away goals scored; 7) Play-off if relevant for deciding champion, relegation or participating in a European league, otherwise by draw. 8) Penalty shoot-out (only after a play-off)
(C) Champions; (O) Play-off winners; (P) Promoted

==== Results summary ====
Overall								Home						Away					
Pld	W	D	L	GF	GA	GD	Pts	W	D	L	GF	GA	GD	W	D	L	GF	GA	GD
38	27	4	7	103	42	+61	85	15	3	1	61	17	+44	12	1	6	42	25	+17

Source: Keuken Kampioen Divisie

==== Results by round ====
Round	1	2	3	4	5	6	7	8	9	10	11	12	13	14	15	16	17	18	19	20	21	22	23	24	25	26	27	28	29	30	31	32	33	34	35	36	37	38
Ground	H	A	A	H	A	H	A	H	A	H	A	H	A	A	H	H	A	H	A	H	A	A	H	A	H	H	A	H	A	H	H	A	H	A	H	A	A	H
Result	W	W	W	D	L	W	W	W	W	W	L	W	L	W	W	W	W	W	D	L	W	L	W	L	D	W	W	W	W	W	D	L	W	W	W	W	W	W
Position																																						

Source: Keuken Kampioen Divisie
A = Away; H = Home; W = Win; D = Draw; L = Loss

==== Matches ====
The league fixtures were announced on 17 June 2022.

5 August 2022 1	Heracles Almelo	4–0	ADO Den Haag	Almelo
CEST (UTC+2)				Stadium: Erve Asito

29 August 2022 4	Heracles Almelo	2–2	MVV Maastricht	Almelo
CEST (UTC+2)				Stadium: Erve Asito

9 September 2022 6	Heracles Almelo	5–3	VVV-Venlo	Almelo
CEST (UTC+2)				Stadium: Erve Asito

23 September 2022 8	Heracles Almelo	2–0	Helmond Sport	Almelo
CEST (UTC+2)				Stadium: Erve Asito

7 October 2022 10	Heracles Almelo	3–2	De Graafschap	Almelo
CEST (UTC+2)				Stadium: Erve Asito

21 October 2022 12	Heracles Almelo	3–0	Eindhoven	Almelo
CEST (UTC+2)				Stadium: Erve Asito

11 November 2022 15	Heracles Almelo	5–1	NAC Breda	Almelo
CET (UTC+1)				Stadium: Erve Asito

19 November 2022 16	Heracles Almelo	3–0	TOP Oss	Almelo
CET (UTC+1)				Stadium: Erve Asito

16 December 2022 18	Heracles Almelo	8–1	Dordrecht	Almelo
CET (UTC+1)				Stadium: Erve Asito

15 January 2023 20	Heracles Almelo	0–3	PEC Zwolle	Almelo
CET (UTC+1)				Stadium: Erve Asito

3 February 2023 23	Heracles Almelo	6–1	Jong Utrecht	Almelo
CET (UTC+1)				Stadium: Erve Asito

17 February 2023 25	Heracles Almelo	1–1	Willem II	Almelo
CET (UTC+1)				Stadium: Erve Asito

24 February 2023 26	Heracles Almelo	7–0	Telstar	Almelo
CET (UTC+1)				Stadium: Erve Asito

10 March 2023 28	Heracles Almelo	2–0	Jong AZ	Almelo
CET (UTC+1)				Stadium: Erve Asito

26 March 2023 30	Heracles Almelo	3–2	Den Bosch	Almelo
CEST (UTC+2)				Stadium: Erve Asito

31 March 2023 31	Heracles Almelo	1–1	Almere City	Almelo
CEST (UTC+2)				Stadium: Erve Asito

14 April 2023 33	Heracles Almelo	1–0	Roda JC	Almelo
CEST (UTC+2)				Stadium: Erve Asito

28 April 2023 35	Heracles Almelo	3–0	Jong PSV	Almelo
CEST (UTC+2)				Stadium: Erve Asito

19 May 2023 38	Heracles Almelo	2–0	Jong Ajax	Almelo
CEST (UTC+2)				Stadium: Erve Asito
