= 2023–24 Heracles Almelo season =

Heracles Almelo
2023–24 season
- Manager: John Lammers
- Stadium: Erve Asito
- Eredivisie: 14th
- KNVB Cup: First round

The 2023–24 season was Heracles Almelo's 121st season in existence and first one back in the Dutch top division Eredivisie. They also competed in the KNVB Cup.

== Players ==
As of 17 September 2023

Note: Flags indicate national team as defined under FIFA eligibility rules; some limited exceptions apply. Players may hold more than one non-FIFA nationality.

No.	Pos.	Nation	Player
1	GK	NED	Michael Brouwer
2	DF	NED	Sylian Mokono
3	DF	GER	Jannes Wieckhoff
4	DF	GER	Sven Sonnenberg
6	DF	SRB	Sava-Arangel Čestić
7	FW	BEL	Bryan Limbombe
8	FW	GER	Mario Engels
9	FW	ITA	Antonio Satriano
10	MF	MAR	Anas Ouahim
11	FW	DEN	Nikolai Laursen
12	DF	NED	Ruben Roosken
14	MF	BEL	Brian De Keersmaecker
15	DF	NED	Jetro Willems
16	GK	NED	Fabian de Keijzer
17	MF	NED	Thomas Bruns

No.	Pos.	Nation	Player
18	MF	NED	Marko Vejinović
19	DF	SUR	Navajo Bakboord
21	DF	NED	Justin Hoogma (captain)
23	FW	NED	Jizz Hornkamp
24	FW	GER	Abdenego Nankishi (on loan from Werder Bremen)
27	MF	TUR	Melih İbrahimoğlu
28	GK	NED	Robin Jalving
29	FW	SWE	Emil Hansson
30	FW	NED	Diego van Oorschot
32	MF	NED	Sem Scheperman
34	DF	NED	Chiel Olde Keizer
35	DF	NED	Stijn Bultman
36	GK	NED	Timo Jansink
39	FW	GER	Lasse Wehmeyer
44	FW	NED	Mohamed Sankoh (on loan from VfB Stuttgart)

== Transfers ==
=== In ===
Pos.	Player	Transferred from	Fee	Date	Source
DF	(Netherlands) Jetro Willems	(Netherlands) FC Groningen	Free	1 July 2023	
FW	(Netherlands) Mohamed Sankoh	(Germany) VfB Stuttgart	Loan	1 September 2023	

=== Out ===
Pos.	Player	Transferred to	Fee	Date	Source
DF	(Germany) Marco Rente	(Netherlands) FC Groningen	€630,000	1 July 2023	

== Pre-season and friendlies ==
Win Draw Loss Fixtures

28 July 2023 Friendly	Heralces Almelo (Netherlands)	2–1	(Netherlands) Excelsior
19:00

5 August 2023 Friendly	Heralces Almelo (Netherlands)	1–3	(Netherlands) FC Volendam
14:30

5 August 2023 Friendly	Heralces Almelo (Netherlands)	2–0	(Netherlands) Helmond Sport
17:00

12 October 2023 Friendly	Schalke 04 (Germany)	4–1	(Netherlands) Heralces Almelo
13:00

== Competitions ==
=== Overall record ===
Competition	First match	Last match	Starting round	Final position	Record							
Competition	First match	Last match	Starting round	Final position	Pld	W	D	L	GF	GA	GD	Win %
Eredivisie	12 August 2023	19 May 2024	Matchday 1		22	6	4	12	29	52	−23	27.27
KNVB Cup	1 November 2023		First round	First round	1	0	0	1	0	2	−2	0.00
Total					23	6	4	13	29	54	−25	26.09

Last updated: 16 February 2024
Source: Soccerway

=== Eredivisie ===
==== League table ====
Pos	Team	Pld	W	D	L	GF	GA	GD	Pts	Qualification or relegation
12	PEC Zwolle	34	9	9	16	45	67	−22	36	
13	Almere City	34	7	13	14	33	59	−26	34	
14	Heracles Almelo	34	9	6	19	41	74	−33	33	
15	RKC Waalwijk	34	7	8	19	38	56	−18	29	
16	Excelsior (R)	34	6	11	17	50	73	−23	29	Qualification for the Relegation play-off

Source: Eredivisie
Rules for classification: Season in progress: 1) Most points won; 2) Less points lost; 3) Goal difference; 4) Goals scored; 5) Alphabetical order; End of season: 1) Points; 2) Goal difference; 3) Goals scored; 4) Head-to-head points; 5) Head-to-head goal difference; 6) Head-to-head away goals scored; 7) Play-off if relevant for deciding champion, relegation or participating in a European league, otherwise by draw. 8) Penalty shoot-out (only after a play-off)
(R) Relegated

==== Results summary ====
Overall								Home						Away					
Pld	W	D	L	GF	GA	GD	Pts	W	D	L	GF	GA	GD	W	D	L	GF	GA	GD
0	0	0	0	0	0	0	0	0	0	0	0	0	0	0	0	0	0	0	0

Last updated: 16 February 2024.

==== Results by round ====
Round	1	2	3	4	5	6	7	8	9	10	11	12	13	14	15	16	17	18	19	20	21	22	23	24	25	26	27	28	29	30	31	32	33	34
Ground	A	H	A	H	H	A	H	A	H	A	H	A	A	H	A	H	A	H	H	A	H	A	A	H	A	H	A	H	A	H	A	H	A	H
Result	L	W	D	W	L	D	W	L	D	L	L	L	W	L	L	L	W	D	L	L	W	L	L	D	L	W	L	W	W	L	L	L		
Position	15	10	10	7	9	10	8	9	8	9	12	14	11	13	14	15	14	15	15	15	14	14	14	14	14	14	14	13	13	14	14	14		

A = Away; H = Home; W = Win; D = Draw; L = Loss

==== Matches ====
The league fixtures were unveiled on 30 June 2023.

12 August 2023 1	Ajax	4–1	Heracles Almelo	Amsterdam
CET (UTC+1)

18 August 2023 2	Heracles Almelo	2–1	NEC Nijmegen	Almelo
CET (UTC+1)				Stadium: Erve Asito

2 September 2023 3	Heracles Almelo	3–1	Excelsior	Almelo
CET (UTC+1)				Stadium: Erve Asito

16 September 2023 4	Heracles Almelo	1–3	FC Utrecht	Almelo
CET (UTC+1)				Stadium: Erve Asito

23 September 2023 5	FC Volendam	2–2	Heracles Almelo	Volendam
CET (UTC+1)

28 September 2023 6	AZ	1–1	Heracles Almelo	Alkmaar
CET (UTC+1)

1 October 2023 7	Heracles Almelo	2–1	PEC Zwolle	Almelo
14:30 CEST	Hansson 69' (pen.), 82'	Report	53' Thy	Stadium: Erve Asito; Attendance: 11,624; Referee: Nijhuis

7 October 2023 8	Go Ahead Eagles	4–0	Heracles Almelo	Deventer
CET (UTC+1)

22 October 2023 9	Heracles Almelo	2–2	FC Twente	Almelo
CET (UTC+1)				Stadium: Erve Asito

28 October 2023 10	SC Heerenveen	3–0	Heracles Almelo	Heerenveen
CET (UTC+1)

4 November 2023 11	Heracles Almelo	0–6	PSV	Almelo
CET (UTC+1)				Stadium: Erve Asito

10 November 2023 12	Fortuna Sittard	4–1	Heracles Almelo	Sittard
		Report		Stadium: Fortuna Sittard Stadion; Attendance: 10,196; Referee: Allard Lindhout

26 November 2023 13	Almere	0−5	Heracles Almelo	Almere
12:30 CET (UTC+1)			Sankoh 4' 64' 87'; Roosken (yellow card) 19'; Ouahim (yellow card) 62'; Nankishi 71' 78'; Wieckhoff (yellow card) 90+1'	Stadium: Yanmar Stadion; Attendance: 4,222; Referee: Jannick van der Laan

2 December 2023 14	Heracles Almelo	0–1	Sparta Rotterdam	Almelo
CET (UTC+1)				Stadium: Erve Asito

10 December 2023 15	Vitesse	2–0	Heracles Almelo	Arnhem
20:00 CET (UTC+1)		Report		Stadium: GelreDome

17 December 2023 16	Heracles Almelo	0–4	Feyenoord	Almelo
14:30 CET (UTC+1)		Report	4', 18' Stengs; 48' Geertruida; 60' Timber	Stadium: Erve Asito; Attendance: 12,080; Referee: Jeroen Manschot

12 January 2024 17	RKC Waalwijk	1–2	Heracles Almelo	Waalwijk
20:00 CET (UTC+1)	Kramer 53' (pen.)	Report	Hansson 35' (pen.); Engels 59'	Stadium: Mandemakers Stadion

27 January 2024 19	Heracles Almelo	2–4	Ajax	Almelo
21:00 CET (UTC+1)	Hornkamp 12'; De Keersmaecker (yellow card) 15'; Engels 60'; Cestic (yellow card) 90'	Report	Brobbey 16', 57'; Berghuis 55'; Taylor (yellow card) 81'; Hlynsson 84'	Stadium: Erve Asito; Attendance: 12,080; Referee: Dennis Higler

=== KNVB Cup ===
1 November 2023 First round	HHC	2–0	Heracles Almelo
CET (UTC+1)
