= Sticker (disambiguation) =

Sticker may refer to any of the following:

- A sticker, an adhesive label
- Sticker (Internet), mobile apps emoticon
- Sticker grass (disambiguation), bur-producing plants
- Bumper sticker, on an automobile bumper
- The Schulenburg Sticker, a Texas, US newspaper
- Sticker (album), 2021, by NCT 127
  - "Sticker" (song)
- Sticker, a character from the sixth season of Battle for Dream Island, an animated web series

== Places ==
- Sticker, Cornwall, a village in England

== People ==
- Jonah Sticker (born 2004), German footballer
- Josephine Sticker, an Austrian freestyle swimmer
