= Antonio Satriano =

Italian footballer (born 2003)

Personal information
- Date of birth: 30 October 2003 (age 23)
- Place of birth: Locri, Italy
- Height: 1.85 m (6 ft 1 in)
- Position: Centre-forward

Team information
- Current team: Pro Vercelli
- Number: 45

Youth career
- –2014: Audax Gioiosa
- 2014–2018: Crotone
- 2018–2023: Roma

Senior career*
Years	Team	Apps	(Gls)
2023–2026	Heracles Almelo	13	(1)
2024	→ Trento (loan)	8	(1)
2024–2025	→ Casertana (loan)	7	(0)
2025	→ Renate (loan)	1	(0)
2025–2026	→ Emmen (loan)	0	(0)
2026–	Pro Vercelli	9	(1)

International career^{‡}
2022	Italy U20	1	(0)
- * Club domestic league appearances and goals as of 30 April 2026 ‡ National team caps and goals as of 23:00, 21 November 2022 (UTC)

Antonio Satriano (born 30 October 2003) is an Italian professional footballer who plays as a centre-forward for Serie C Group A club Pro Vercelli.

== Club career ==
=== Early career and Roma ===
Born in Locri, Satriano started playing football at the local grassroots school Audax Gioiosa, before moving to Crotone in 2014. In the spring of 2018, aged 15, he was scouted by Roma during a match between the clubs' respective under-16 teams, and subsequently joined the Giallorossi's youth sector a few months later.

Having come through Roma's youth ranks, the forward signed his first professional contract with the club in September 2020, before reaching the final of the under-19 national championship in May 2022.

=== Heracles Almelo ===
On 5 January 2023, Satriano joined Dutch side Heracles Almelo on a permanent deal, signing a contract until June 2027. The transfer commanded an estimated fee of €400,000, with a 20% sell-on clause in favor of Roma.

The forward made his professional debut for Heracles one week later, on 12 January, coming on as a substitute for Samuel Armenteros in the 72nd minute of a 1–0 KNVB Cup loss against Go Ahead Eagles. Three days later, he made his league debut, coming on for Abdenego Nankishi in the final minutes of a 0–3 Eerste Divisie loss against PEC Zwolle. On 13 February, he made his first professional start in a 2–0 league win against MVV Maastricht. During the season, despite missing out on the last months due to a fifth metatarsal fracture, Satriano helped Heracles gain automatic promotion back to the Eredivisie after just one year.

==== Loan to Trento ====
On 23 January 2024, Satriano was loaned out to Serie C side Trento until the end of the season, with the deal including an option to buy. On 5 March, he scored his first goal for the club in a 1–0 league win over Alessandria.

==== Loan to Casertana ====
On 27 August 2024, Satriano joined Serie C club Casertana on a season-long loan.

==== Loan to Emmen ====
On 2 September 2025, Satriano moved on a new loan to Emmen.

=== Pro Vercelli ===
On 2 February 2026, Satriano returned to Italy and signed with Serie C club Pro Vercelli until 30 June 2027.

== International career ==
Satriano has represented Italy at youth international level.

After taking part in training camps with the under-15 (in 2017) and under-17 national teams (in 2019), he then went on to play for the under-20 national team.

== Style of play ==
Satriano is a centre-forward, who has been regarded for his finishing, his physique and his technical skills. Despite being naturally right-footed, he can still use his left foot effectively.

== Career statistics ==
=== Club ===
As of match played 7 May 2024

Appearances and goals by club, season and competition
Club	Season	League			Cup (Note: Appearance(s) in the KNVB Beker)		Europe		Other		Total	
Club	Season	Division	Apps	Goals	Apps	Goals	Apps	Goals	Apps	Goals	Apps	Goals
Roma	2022–23	Serie A	0	0	0	0	0	0	—		0	0
Heracles Almelo	2022–23	Eerste Divisie	6	1	1	0	—		—		7	1
Heracles Almelo	2023–24	Eredivisie	6	0	0	0	—		—		6	0
Trento	2023–24	Serie C	8	1	—		—		1	0	9	1
Career total			20	2	1	0	0	0	1	0	22	2
