= Stijn Bultman =

Dutch footballer (born 2005)

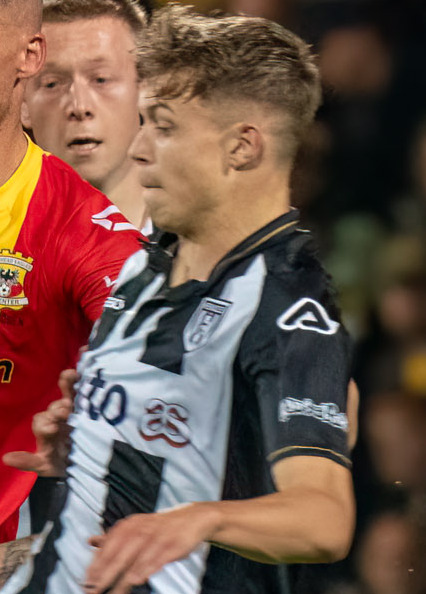
- Bultman with Heracles Almelo in 2023

Personal information
- Date of birth: 29 January 2005 (age 21)
- Place of birth: Raalte, Netherlands
- Height: 1.87 m (6 ft 2 in)
- Positions: Centre-back; right back

Team information
- Current team: Heracles Almelo
- Number: 35

Youth career
- –2013: Rohda Raalte
- 2013–2023: Twente/Heracles Academy

Senior career*
Years	Team	Apps	(Gls)
2023–	Heracles Almelo	16	(0)
2025–2026	→ De Graafschap (loan)	28	(1)

International career^{‡}
2023–2024	Netherlands U19	7	(0)
- * Club domestic league appearances and goals as of 2 October 2026 ‡ National team caps and goals as of 3 February 2026

Stijn Bultman (born 29 January 2005) is a Dutch professional footballer who plays as a centre-back for Eerste Divisie club Heracles Almelo.

== Club career ==
Bultman played youth football for Rohda Raalte before joining the shared Twente/Heracles Academy in 2013. In the summer of 2023, he signed his first professional contract with Heracles Almelo.

He made his professional debut in the Eredivisie on 18 August 2023 against NEC, coming on at half-time for Sven Sonnenberg in a 2–1 home victory. He went on to make 14 league appearances during the 2023–24 season.

In March 2024, Bultman suffered a meniscus injury that ended his season. During his rehabilitation, he signed a contract extension with Heracles until June 2026, with an option for an additional year. He spent nearly ten months sidelined and played only for the reserve team during the 2024–25 season.

In July 2025, Bultman joined De Graafschap on a season-long loan.

== International career ==
Bultman represented the Netherlands U19 between 2023 and 2024, earning seven caps.

== Career statistics ==
Appearances and goals by club, season and competition
Club	Season	League			Cup		Total	
Club	Season	Division	Apps	Goals	Apps	Goals	Apps	Goals
Heracles Almelo	2023–24	Eredivisie	14	0	0	0	14	0
Heracles Almelo	2024–25	Eredivisie	0	0	0	0	0	0
Heracles Almelo	Total		14	0	0	0	14	0
De Graafschap (loan)	2025–26	Eerste Divisie	20	0	1	0	21	0
Career total			34	0	1	0	35	0
