= Michael Brouwer =

Dutch footballer (born 1993)

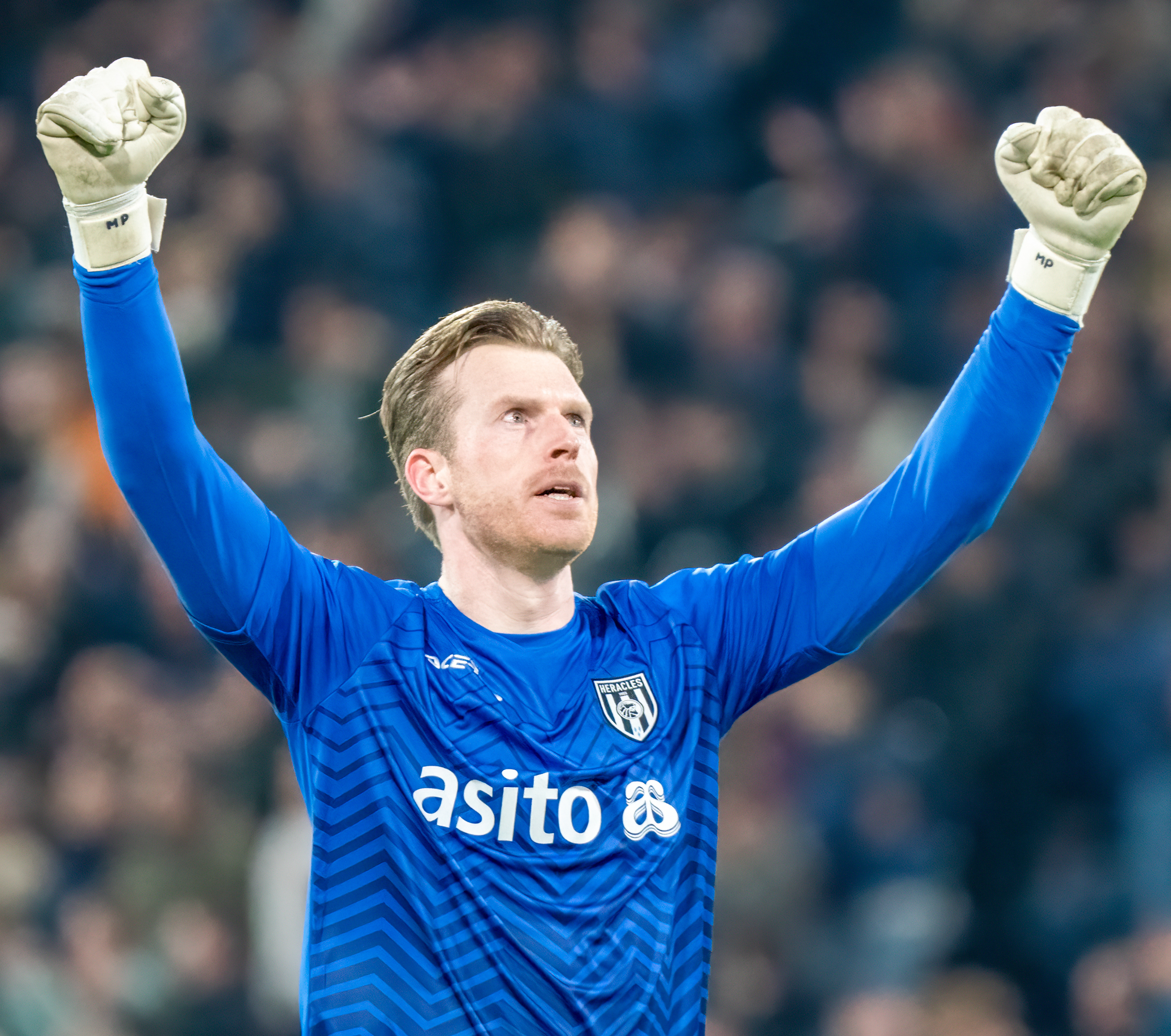

Personal information
- Date of birth: 21 January 1993 (age 33)
- Place of birth: Apeldoorn, Netherlands
- Height: 1.90 m (6 ft 3 in)
- Position: Goalkeeper

Team information
- Current team: Sparta Rotterdam

Youth career
- 2007–2011: Vitesse
- 2011–2012: Twente
- 2012–2013: AGOVV

Senior career*
Years	Team	Apps	(Gls)
2013–2024	Heracles Almelo	81	(0)
2021–2022	→ Emmen (loan)	38	(0)
2024–2026	Utrecht	6	(0)
2025	Jong Utrecht	1	(0)
2026–	Sparta Rotterdam	6	(0)

International career
2009	Netherlands U16	1	(0)
- * Club domestic league appearances and goals as of 25 October 2026

Michael Brouwer (born 21 January 1993) is a Dutch footballer who plays as a goalkeeper for Eredivisie club Sparta Rotterdam.

== Club career ==
Brouwer was a product of the youth academies of Vitesse, Twente, and AGOVV before joining Heracles Almelo in 2013. Brouwer made his professional debut for Heracles in a 2–1 KNVB Cup win over Den Bosch on 25 September 2018. His first appearance came after five years (1912 days) at the club without playing in a professional match.

On 26 June 2021, he joined Emmen on a season-long loan.

On 25 July 2024, Brouwer joined Utrecht on a two-year contract.

On 1 September 2026, Brouwer signed with Sparta Rotterdam for two seasons.

== Career statistics ==
As of match played 25 October 2026

Appearances and goals by club, season and competition
Club	Season	League			National Cup		Continental		Other		Total	
Club	Season	Division	Apps	Goals	Apps	Goals	Apps	Goals	Apps	Goals	Apps	Goals
Heracles Almelo	2018–19	Eredivisie	2	0	2	0	—		—		4	0
Heracles Almelo	2019–20	Eredivisie	0	0	3	0	—		—		3	0
Heracles Almelo	2020–21	Eredivisie	7	0	1	0	—		—		8	0
Heracles Almelo	2022–23	Eerste Divisie	38	0	0	0	—		—		38	0
Heracles Almelo	2023–24	Eredivisie	34	0	0	0	—		—		34	0
Heracles Almelo	Total		81	0	6	0	—		—		87	0
FC Emmen (loan)	2021–22	Eerste Divisie	38	0	1	0	—		—		39	0
Utrecht	2024–25	Eredivisie	3	0	3	0	—		—		6	0
Utrecht	2025–26	Eredivisie	2	0	0	0	3 (Note: Appearances in UEFA Europa League)	0	—		5	0
Utrecht	2026–27	Eredivisie	1	0	0	0	—		—		1	0
Utrecht	Total		6	0	3	0	3	0	—		12	0
Sparta Rotterdam	2026–27	Eredivisie	6	0	0	0	—		—		6	0
Career totals			131	0	10	0	3	0	0	0	144	0

== International career ==
Brouwer made one appearance for the Netherlands national under-16 football team in 2009.

== Honours ==
Emmen

- Eerste Divisie: 2021–22

Heracles Almelo

- Eerste Divisie: 2022–23

Individual

- Eerste Divisie Goalkeeper of the Season: 2022–23
