= Jan van Staa =

Dutch football manager

Personal information
- Date of birth: 27 May 1955 (age 71)
- Place of birth: Utrecht, Netherlands
- Position: Midfielder

Senior career*
Years	Team	Apps	(Gls)
1973–1981	FC Utrecht		
1981–1988	Heracles Almelo		

Managerial career
- 1995–1996: Heracles Almelo
- 1997–2001: Go Ahead Eagles
- 2004–2006: FC Twente (assistant)
- 2006: FC Twente
- 2017–2018: Go Ahead Eagles
- * Club domestic league appearances and goals

Jan van Staa (born 27 May 1955) is a retired Dutch football midfielder and later manager.
