= David Davison =

English footballer and manager

- Davison in 1948

Personal information
- Date of birth: 1916
- Place of birth: Wardley, England
- Position: Goalkeeper

Senior career*
Years	Team	Apps	(Gls)
	Bolton Wanderers	0	(0)
- Kingstonian
- Chelmsford
1938–1939	Chelmsford City	26	(0)
1939–1940	Blackburn Rovers	0	(0)

Managerial career
- 1948–1949: Heracles Almelo
- 1950: Bayern Munich
- * Club domestic league appearances and goals

David Davison (born between April and June 1916) was an English footballer who played as a goalkeeper, later becoming a manager. He played for Chelmsford City and Blackburn Rovers. After the war he coached Heracles Almelo in the Netherlands and Bayern Munich in Germany. He was born in Wardley, County Durham.

In March 1939 David Davison transferred as a 22 year old for a fee of £500 from Southern League side Chelmsford City to the Football League Second Division club Blackburn Rovers. Before Davison's time at Chelmsford City, he had played for Bolton Wanderers, Kingstonian and the old Chelmsford amateur club.

After the war he was coaching the football team of the British forces in Germany. In July 1948, then aged 34, he was given the coaching position of Heracles Almelo, a club of the eastern division of the Dutch First Division where he succeeded player-coach Koldewey (who in turn was the successor of Leslie Lievesley who died as manager of Il Grande Torino at the Superga plane crash). In February 1949 he was sacked after an altercation with the ground-keeper, after the club had felt unhappy with his achievements anyway. Heracles finished the season as third of its league.

In summer 1950 he was hired by Bayern Munich as successor to Alv Riemke. In November the club was just a couple of points outside the relegation zone of the Oberliga Süd, the southern division of Germany's highest football tier, and Davison was found out to have been involved in a pub brawl. As a consequence he was fired. Bayern finished the league as ninth. After interim solutions with former players and a player-manager, Max Schäfer, up to then with local rivals TSV 1860 Munich, became Bayern's manager for the 1951/52 season.

Davison was a cousin of footballer Ned Barkas.
