= Robert Roxburgh =

English footballer (1896–1974)

Personal information
- Full name: Robert Roxburgh
- Date of birth: 5 February 1896
- Place of birth: Morpeth, England
- Date of death: 1974 (aged 77–78)
- Position: Full back

Senior career*
Years	Team	Apps	(Gls)
1919–1920	Morpeth Comrades		
1920–1924	Newcastle United	24	(0)
1924–1930	Blackburn Rovers	114	(0)
Total		138	(0)

Managerial career
- 1932–1935: Heracles Almelo
- * Club domestic league appearances and goals

Robert Roxburgh (5 February 1896 – 1974) was an English footballer who played in the Football League for Blackburn Rovers and Newcastle United.
