= Frans van der Veen =

Dutch footballer

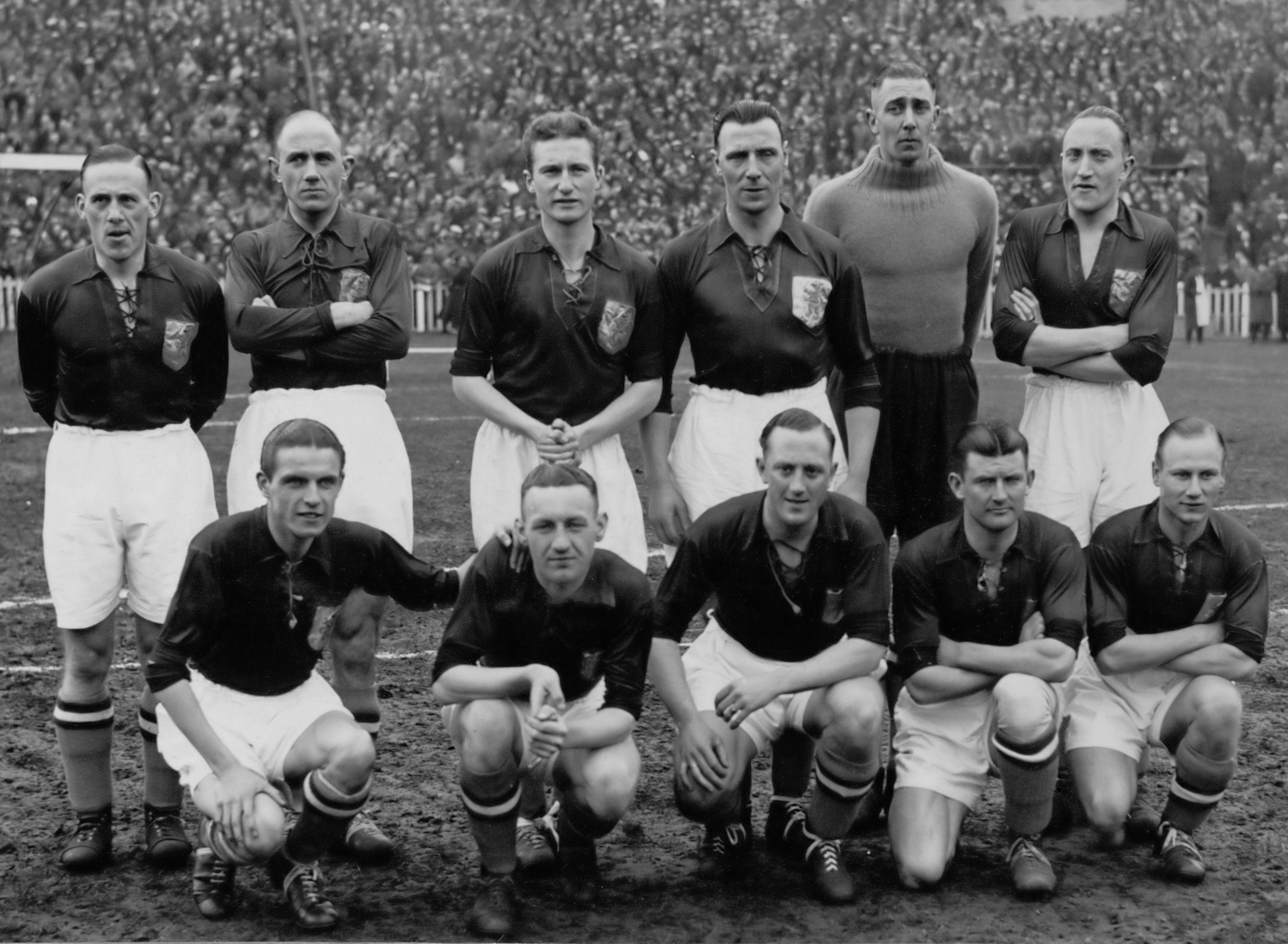
- Van der Veen seated, 2nd from the left, in 1939.

Personal information
- Date of birth: 25 March 1919
- Place of birth: Almelo, Netherlands
- Date of death: 4 May 1975 (aged 56)
- Position: Forward

Senior career*
Years	Team	Apps	(Gls)
- Heracles Almelo

International career
1938–1940	Netherlands	8	(1)
- * Club domestic league appearances and goals

Franciscus Christian van der Veen (25 March 1919 – 4 May 1975) was a Dutch football forward who played for the Netherlands in the 1938 FIFA World Cup. He also played for Heracles Almelo winning the Dutch championship in 1941.
