= 1940–41 Netherlands Football League Championship =

Netherl. Football Championship
- Season: 1940–1941
- Champions: Heracles (2nd title)

The Netherlands Football League Championship 1940–1941 was contested by 52 teams participating in five divisions. The national champion would be determined by a play-off featuring the winners of the eastern, northern, southern and two western football divisions of the Netherlands. Heracles won its second championship this year by beating PSV Eindhoven, ADO Den Haag, Be Quick 1887 and VSV.

== Divisions ==
=== Eerste Klasse East ===
Pos	Team	Pld	W	D	L	GF	GA	GD	Pts	Qualification or relegation
1	Heracles	18	13	4	1	53	12	+41	30	Qualified for Championship play-off
2	NEC Nijmegen	18	11	4	3	52	28	+24	26	
3	HVV Tubantia	18	9	5	4	44	33	+11	23	
4	SC Enschede	18	9	4	5	37	29	+8	22	
5	Enschedese Boys	18	7	1	10	31	43	−12	15	
6	FC Wageningen	18	6	2	10	36	48	−12	14	
7	Quick Nijmegen	18	5	4	9	24	34	−10	14	
8	HVV Hengelo	18	6	1	11	37	56	−19	13	
9	AGOVV Apeldoorn	18	6	1	11	21	41	−20	13	
10	Go Ahead	18	5	0	13	27	38	−11	10	Relegated to 2nd Division

Source: rsssf.com

=== Eerste Klasse North ===
Pos	Team	Pld	W	D	L	GF	GA	GD	Pts	Qualification or relegation
1	Be Quick 1887	19	13	4	2	47	22	+25	30	Qualified for Championship play-off
2	HSC	19	12	4	3	43	27	+16	28	
3	Velocitas 1897	18	12	2	4	36	28	+8	26	
4	VV Leeuwarden	18	10	1	7	46	27	+19	21	
5	sc Heerenveen	18	7	5	6	52	49	+3	19	
6	GVAV Rapiditas	18	7	4	7	35	22	+13	18	
7	Achilles 1894	18	3	6	9	44	57	−13	12	
8	Sneek Wit Zwart	18	4	5	9	18	32	−14	11 (Note: 2 points deducted)	
9	Veendam	18	2	4	12	27	54	−27	8	
10	WVV Winschoten	18	3	1	14	32	62	−30	7	Relegated to 2nd Division

Source: rsssf.com

=== Eerste Klasse South ===
Pos	Team	Pld	W	D	L	GF	GA	GD	Pts	Qualification or relegation
1	PSV Eindhoven	22	15	3	4	63	27	+36	33	Qualified for Championship play-off
2	LONGA	22	13	4	5	52	31	+21	30	
3	Juliana	22	12	5	5	67	37	+30	29	Changed name to Spekholzerheide (Note: Juliana, named after the princess who was staying in England and Canada during the war, were forced to change the name into Spekholzerheide in order to discourage any resistance against the occupation. Apparently, this rule only applied to clubs named after living members of the house of Oranje, as Willem II was allowed to keep its name (but second level Wilhelmina from Den Bosch were renamed De Kanaries).)
4	NAC	22	10	6	6	45	37	+8	26	
5	MVV Maastricht	22	8	6	8	37	39	−2	22	
6	BVV Den Bosch	22	8	5	9	34	41	−7	21	
7	FC Eindhoven	22	8	4	10	47	45	+2	20	
8	NOAD	22	9	2	11	40	52	−12	20	
9	Willem II	22	7	4	11	37	42	−5	18	
10	HVV Helmond	22	6	4	12	29	53	−24	16	
11	RFC Roermond	22	4	7	11	32	70	−38	15	
12	Limburgia	22	5	4	13	32	41	−9	14	Relegated to 2nd Division

Source: rsssf.com

=== Eerste Klasse West-I ===
Moving in from Division West-II: CVV Rotterdam, HBS Craeyenhout, RFC Rotterdam, VUC Den Haag and Xerxes.

Pos	Team	Pld	W	D	L	GF	GA	GD	Pts	Qualification or relegation
1	VSV	18	14	2	2	61	27	+34	30	Qualified for Championship play-off Moved to Division West-II next season
2	AFC Ajax	18	8	6	4	53	31	+22	22	
3	HFC Haarlem	18	10	2	6	42	32	+10	22	Moved to Division West-II next season
4	DOS	18	9	3	6	56	48	+8	21	
5	VUC	18	7	4	7	50	55	−5	18	
6	Blauw-Wit Amsterdam	18	6	5	7	34	29	+5	17	Moved to Division West-II next season
7	Xerxes	18	6	3	9	42	50	−8	15	
8	HBS Craeyenhout	18	5	4	9	43	50	−7	14	Moved to Division West-II next season
9	RFC Rotterdam	18	5	4	9	32	46	−14	14	Moved to Division West-II next season
10	CVV Mercurius	18	2	3	13	22	67	−45	7	Relegated to 2nd Division

Source: rsssf.com

=== Eerste Klasse West-II ===
Moving in from Division West-I: ADO Den haag, DWS, HVV 't Gooi, KFC and Stormvogels

Pos	Team	Pld	W	D	L	GF	GA	GD	Pts	Qualification or relegation
1	ADO Den Haag	20	11	8	1	53	32	+21	30	Qualified for Championship play-off Moved to Division West-I next season
2	DHC Delft	20	11	6	3	50	34	+16	28	
3	DWS	18	8	4	6	26	27	−1	20	Moved to Division West-I next season
4	Sparta Rotterdam	18	8	3	7	44	38	+6	19	
5	DFC	18	7	5	6	39	34	+5	19	Moved to Division West-I next season
6	Feijenoord	18	8	3	7	34	35	−1	19	Moved to Division West-I next season
7	Hermes DVS	18	6	6	6	42	34	+8	18	
8	Stormvogels	18	5	3	10	27	37	−10	13	Moved to Division West-I next season
9	HVV 't Gooi	18	2	6	10	24	39	−15	10	
10	KFC	18	3	2	13	26	55	−29	8	Relegated to 2nd Division

Source: rsssf.com

=== Championship play-off ===
Pos	Team	Pld	W	D	L	GF	GA	GD	Pts	HER	PSV	ADO	BEQ	VSV
1	Heracles	8	6	1	1	27	9	+18	13		6–1	3–1	3–0	3–1
2	PSV Eindhoven	8	3	3	2	12	16	−4	9	1–5		3–2	3–0	1–0
3	ADO Den Haag	8	2	3	3	13	16	−3	7	3–2	2–2		2–4	1–1
4	Be Quick 1887	8	2	2	4	9	19	−10	6	0–3	0–0	1–1		3–2
5	VSV	8	1	3	4	12	13	−1	5	2–2	1–1	0–1	5–1	

Source: rsssf.com
