= Horace Colclough =

English footballer and manager

Personal information
- Full name: Albert Horace Colclough
- Date of birth: 3 November 1888
- Place of birth: Oxford, near Tunstall, Staffordshire, England
- Date of death: 25 May 1976 (aged 87)
- Place of death: New Milton, Hampshire, England
- Position: Left back

Senior career*
Years	Team	Apps	(Gls)
1910–1912	Crewe Alexandra		
1912–1915	Crystal Palace	83	(0)

International career
1914	England	1	(0)

Managerial career
- 1920–1932: Heracles Almelo
- * Club domestic league appearances and goals

Albert Horace Colclough (3 November 1888 – 25 May 1976) was an English international footballer, who played as a left back. He played his club football for Crewe Alexandra and Crystal Palace in the years immediately prior to World War I. His playing career was ended by injuries received during the war after which he became a trainer for Dutch side Heracles Almelo.

== Playing career ==
Colclough started his playing career at Crewe Alexandra, then playing in the Birmingham & District League, signing professional papers in August 1910. After two "impressive" seasons at Crewe, he moved south to join Crystal Palace of the Southern League in 1912.

The 1912–13 club handbook said of him: "This back is new to the Palace, coming from Crewe Alexandra, through whose ranks many good footballers have passed. He plays right or left back." The following year, the handbook added: "very few, if any, better backs have been associated with Crewe Alexandra, and he rendered yeoman service. His strong kicking and accurately-timed rushes serve him well."

He quickly became an established member of the side and earned three call-ups in inter-League matches as well as being selected for the Home Championship match against Wales on 16 March 1914. The match finished 2–0 to England. He was Crystal Palace's first player to be selected for England international honours.

== Later career ==
Colclough's professional playing career finished at the end of the 1914–15 season, when league football was ended by the First World War. During the war he suffered a leg injury that prevented him resurrecting his career after the cessation of hostilities. Sources vary as to the cause of his injury; Graham Betts, in his "England, Player by Player" says that he was injured playing football for the Army, whereas Dutch sources claim that he suffered a gunshot wound to his leg.

In August 1920, he was appointed first-team coach at Dutch club Heracles Almelo where he remained until 1932. During his time at the club, Colclough was known as "d'n trainer met 'n poot " ("the trainer with the leg") because of his war-wound. He improved the club's professional outlook and introduced weekly discussions on tactics.
