= Vincent Heilmann =

Dutch football manager (born 1997)

Personal information
- Date of birth: 24 February 1997 (age 29)
- Place of birth: Tilburg, Netherlands

Team information
- Current team: Heracles (manager)

Youth career
- Years: Team
- PSV

Managerial career
- 2016–2021: PSV (youth)
- 2021–2023: VfL Wolfsburg (assistant)
- 2023: Eupen (assistant)
- 2023–2026: PSV (youth)
- 2026: Heracles (assistant)
- 2026–: Heracles

Vincent Heilmann (born 24 February 1997) is a Dutch professional football manager who manages Heracles.

== Playing career ==
As a youth player, Heilmann joined the youth academy of PSV, where he suffered injuries.

== Managerial career ==
Heilmann started his managerial career as a youth manager of PSV in 2016. Five years later, he was appointed as an assistant manager of German Bundesliga side VfL Wolfsburg.

Following his stint there, he was appointed as an assistant manager of Belgian side Eupen in 2023. The same year, he returned as a youth manager of PSV. Ahead of the 2026–27 season, he was appointed manager of Heracles.

== Personal life ==
Heilmann was born on 24 February 1997 to a German father and a Dutch mother. Born in Tilburg, Netherlands, he is a native of the city and can speak Spanish and German.
