= Sticker grass =

Sticker grass is a common name which may refer to bur-producing plants including:

- Various species of genus Cenchrus
- Various species of genus Soliva
- Tribulus terrestris
