= Sem Scheperman =

Dutch footballer (born 2002)

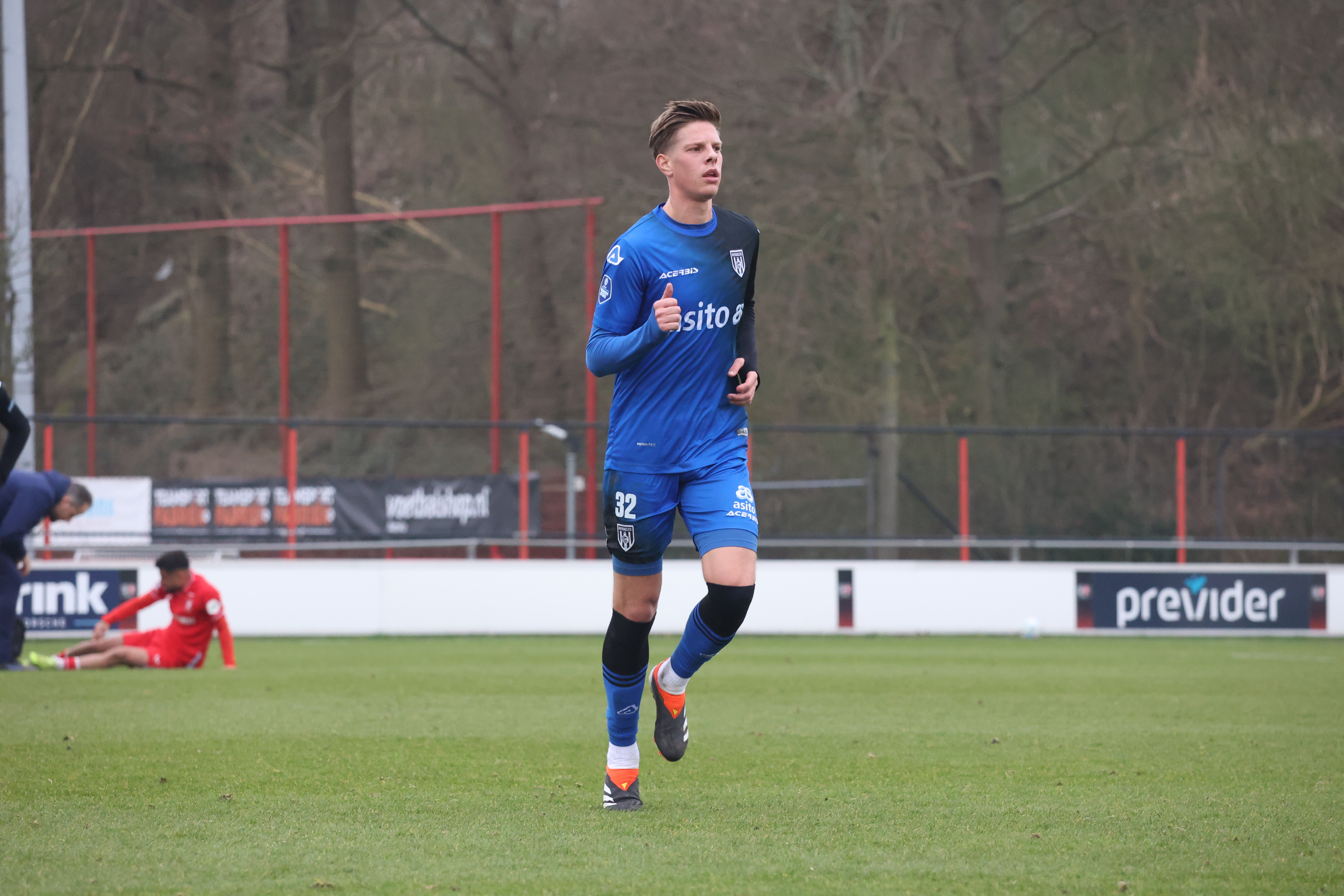
- Scheperman in 2024

Personal information
- Date of birth: 24 June 2002 (age 24)
- Place of birth: Holten, Netherlands
- Height: 1.88 m (6 ft 2 in)
- Position: Midfielder

Team information
- Current team: Heracles Almelo
- Number: 32

Youth career
- –2010: VV Holten
- 2010–2020: FC Twente
- 2020–2022: FC Twente / Heracles Academy

Senior career*
Years	Team	Apps	(Gls)
2022–	Heracles Almelo	82	(3)
- * Club domestic league appearances and goals as of 21 May 2026

Sem Scheperman (born 24 June 2002) is a Dutch professional footballer who plays as a midfielder for Heracles Almelo.

== Career ==
Scheperman played in the youth academies of VV Holten, FC Twente, and later the joint FC Twente/Heracles Almelo Academy. In early 2022, he signed his first professional contract with Heracles Almelo, which initially ran until mid-2023.

He made his Eredivisie debut for Heracles on 11 May 2022 in a 2–0 away defeat against RKC Waalwijk. Scheperman came on in the 77th minute as a substitute for Nikolai Laursen. Heracles finished sixteenth in the Eredivisie that season and entered the relegation play-offs. Scheperman appeared as a substitute in the return leg of the semi-final against Excelsior, but Heracles lost the tie and were relegated to the Eerste Divisie.

In October 2022, his contract was extended until 2025. On 30 July 2025, Scheperman signed a new contract extension keeping him at Heracles Almelo until 2029.

== Career statistics ==
Appearances and goals by club, season and competition
Club	Season	League			Cup		Other		Total	
Club	Season	Division	Apps	Goals	Apps	Goals	Apps	Goals	Apps	Goals
Heracles Almelo	2021–22	Eredivisie	1	0	0	0	1	0	2	0
Heracles Almelo	2022–23	Eerste Divisie	20	1	1	0	–		21	1
Heracles Almelo	2023–24	Eredivisie	22	0	1	0	0	0	23	0
Heracles Almelo	2024–25	Eredivisie	23	1	2	1	0	0	25	2
Career total			66	2	4	1	1	0	71	3
