= Abdenego Nankishi =

German footballer (born 2002)

Personal information
- Full name: Abdenego N'Lola Nankishi
- Date of birth: 6 July 2002 (age 24)
- Place of birth: Bremerhaven, Germany
- Height: 1.78 m (5 ft 10 in)
- Position: Forward

Team information
- Current team: 1. FC Saarbrücken
- Number: 17

Youth career
- 2007–2012: TV Loxstedt
- 2012–2014: LTS Bremerhaven
- 2014–2021: Werder Bremen

Senior career*
Years	Team	Apps	(Gls)
2020–2025	Werder Bremen II	29	(6)
2021–2025	Werder Bremen	6	(0)
2022–2024	→ Heracles Almelo (loan)	21	(5)
2024	→ 1860 Munich (loan)	11	(1)
2025–2026	VfB Stuttgart II	17	(3)
2026–	1. FC Saarbrücken	0	(0)

International career^{‡}
2019	Germany U17	3	(0)
2020	Germany U19	1	(0)
2021	Germany U20	1	(0)
- * Club domestic league appearances and goals as of 30 May 2026 ‡ National team caps and goals as of 13:26, 16 November 2021 (UTC)

Abdenego N'Lola Nankishi (born 6 July 2002) is a German professional footballer who plays as a forward for 3. Liga club 1. FC Saarbrücken. He has represented Germany internationally at youth levels U17, U19 and U20.

== Club career ==
A youth product of TV Loxstedt and LTS Bremerhaven, Nankishi moved to the academy of Werder Bremen in 2014 and worked his way up through all their youth categories. In 2020, he was promoted to their reserves and in 2021 to their senior team. He made his professional debut with Werder Bremen in a 2–0 DFB-Pokal win over VfL Osnabrück on 7 August 2021.

On 17 August 2022, Nankishi joined Heracles Almelo in the Netherlands on a season-long loan. The loan was renewed for the 2023–24 season.

On 31 January 2024, Nankishi moved on a new loan to 1860 Munich.

== International career ==
Born in Germany, Nankishi is of Angolan descent. He is a youth international for Germany, having represented the country at youth levels U17, U19 and U20.

== Career statistics ==
As of 1 June 2022

Appearances and goals by club, season and competition
Club	Season	League			Cup		Other		Total	
Club	Season	Division	Apps	Goals	Apps	Goals	Apps	Goals	Apps	Goals
Werder Bremen II	2020–21	Regionalliga Nord	8	1	–		0	0	8	1
Werder Bremen II	2021–22	Regionalliga Nord	4	1	–		0	0	4	1
Werder Bremen II	Total		12	2	0	0	0	0	12	2
Werder Bremen	2021–22	2. Bundesliga	6	0	1	0	0	0	7	0
Career total			18	2	1	0	0	0	19	2
