= Sven Sonnenberg =

German footballer (born 1999)

Personal information
- Date of birth: 19 January 1999 (age 27)
- Place of birth: Berlin, Germany
- Height: 1.94 m (6 ft 4 in)
- Position: Centre-back

Team information
- Current team: VSG Altglienicke
- Number: 4

Youth career
- Grün-Weiß Großbeeren
- –2014: TuS Koblenz
- 2014–2018: 1. FC Köln

Senior career*
| Years | Team | Apps | (Gls) |
| 2018–2019 | 1. FC Köln II | 20 | (2) |
| 2019–2021 | Hansa Rostock | 62 | (1) |
| 2021–2024 | Heracles Almelo | 67 | (2) |
| 2024–2026 | 1. FC Saarbrücken | 43 | (2) |
| 2026– | VSG Altglienicke | 10 | (1) |

International career
| 2014–2015 | Germany U16 | 4 | (0) |
| 2015–2016 | Germany U17 | 7 | (1) |
| 2017 | Germany U18 | 1 | (0) |
- * Club domestic league appearances and goals as of 23 September 2026

Sven Sonnenberg (born 19 January 1999) is a German professional footballer who plays as a centre-back for Regionalliga Nordost club VSG Altglienicke.

== Club career ==
Sonnenberg made his professional debut for Hansa Rostock in the 3. Liga on 3 August 2019, coming on as a substitute in the 77th minute for Adam Straith in a 1–0 away loss against SpVgg Unterhaching.
