= Timo Jansink =

Dutch footballer

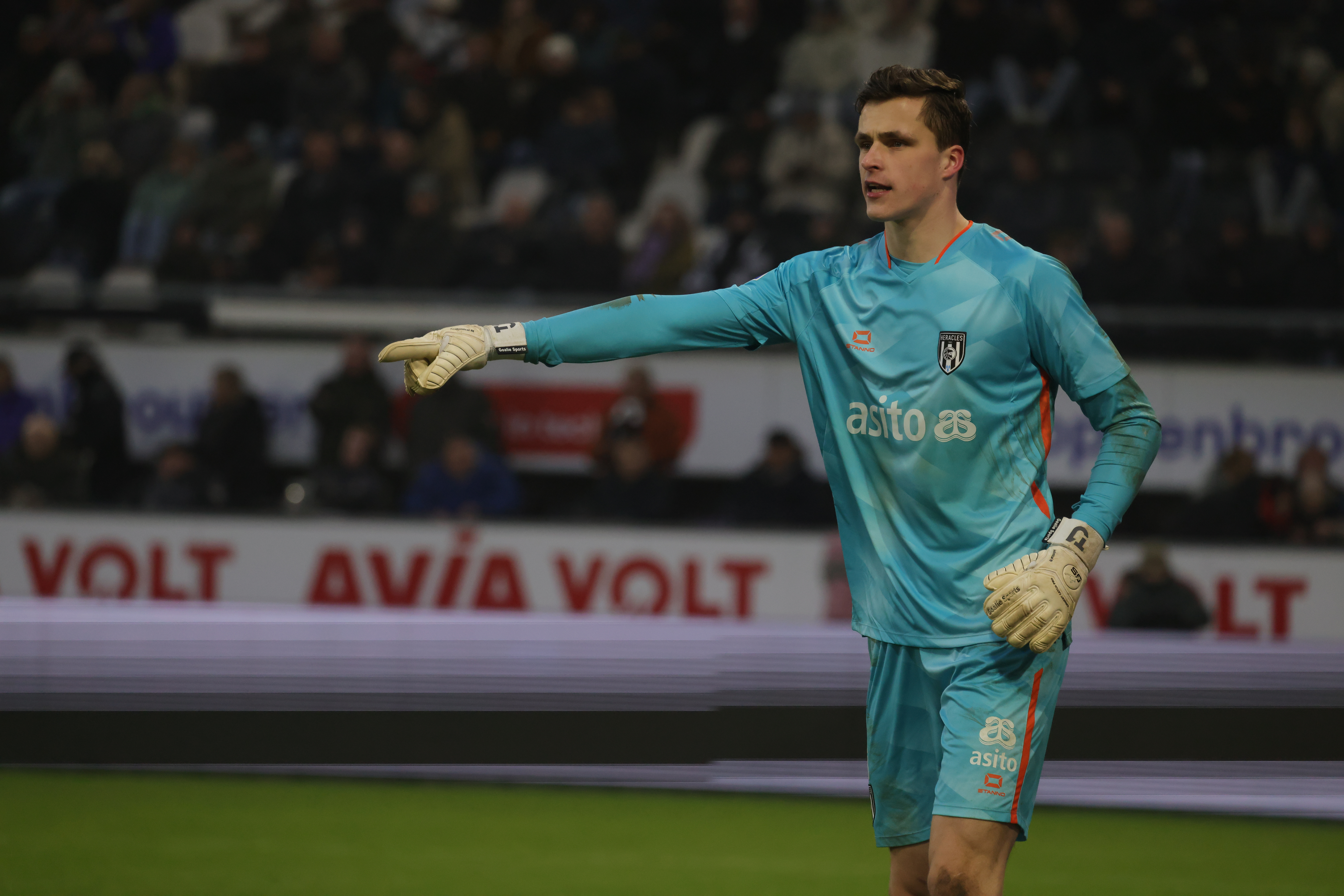
- Jansink in 2026

Personal information
- Date of birth: 16 March 2003 (age 23)
- Place of birth: Oldenzaal, Netherlands
- Height: 2.03 m (6 ft 8 in)
- Position: Goalkeeper

Team information
- Current team: Heracles Almelo
- Number: 16

Youth career
- 2011–2013: De Esch
- 2013–2022: Twente

Senior career*
Years	Team	Apps	(Gls)
2022–	Heracles Almelo	15	(0)
- * Club domestic league appearances and goals as of 21 May 2026 ‡ National team caps and goals as of 18:26, 3 September 2025 (UTC)

Timo Jansink (born 16 March 2003) is a Dutch professional footballer who plays as a goalkeeper for the Eredivisie club Heracles Almelo.

== Club career ==
Jansink is a youth product of the shared youth academy of Twente and Heracles Almelo. On 12 July 2021, he was called up to preseason training camp for Twente. He signed his first professional contract with Heracles on 18 July 2022. On 11 October 2024, he extended his contract with Heracles Almelo until 2029. He made his senior debut with Heracles Almelo in a 1–0 KNVB Cup over FC Winterswijk on 30 October 2024.
