= Heracles Almelo =

Association football club in the Netherlands

Heracles
- Full name: Heracles Almelo
- Nicknames: Heraclieden; Paupers
- Short name: HAFC; SCH
- Founded: 3 May 1903; 123 years ago
- Ground: Asito Stadion
- Capacity: 12,080
- Chairman: Jacob Roche
- Head coach: Vincent Heilmann
- League: Eerste Divisie
- 2025–26: Eredivisie, 18th of 18 (relegated)
- Website: www.heracles.nl
| Home colours | Third colours |

Heracles Almelo (Dutch: [ɦeːˈraːkləs ˈɑlməloː]) is a Dutch professional football club based in Almelo, founded in 1903. They play in the Eerste Divisie, the second tier of Dutch football, following relegation from the Eredivisie in the 2025–26 season. The club has won the Dutch national title twice, in 1927 and 1941. Heracles won the 2004–05 Eerste Divisie, gaining promotion to the Eredivisie for the first time in 28 years. The club remained in the top flight for 17 seasons before suffering relegation at the end of the 2021–22 season. Heracles secured an immediate return to the Eredivisie by winning the 2022–23 Eerste Divisie, but were relegated again three years later.

In 2012, they reached the KNVB Cup final for the first time, losing to PSV in the final. The club's main rival is Twente.

== History ==
The club was founded on 3 May 1903 as Heracles, after the demigod son of Zeus. They changed their name on 1 July 1974 to SC Heracles '74 and finally settled on the current name in 1998.

Heracles finished sixth in the Eredivisie during the 2015–16 season, qualifying for the end of season European play-offs. The club first defeated Groningen and then Utrecht and thus qualified for the first time in club history for European football, starting in the third qualifying round of the 2016–17 UEFA Europa League.

A run of three consecutive losses saw Heracles end the 2021–22 season in sixteenth place, condemning them to the promotion/relegation play-offs. The club were relegated to the Eerste Divisie after losing 6–1 to Excelsior on aggregate in the semifinals. Less than a year later, the Heraclieden sealed an immediate return to the top flight, with a 3–0 home win over Jong PSV securing them a top two finish in the 2022–23 Eerste Divisie and only a week after PEC Zwolle had done so. On 19 May 2023, Heracles won their third Eerste Divisie title after defeating Jong Ajax in the last round of play.

== Stadium ==
Heracles Almelo currently play at the Asito Stadion in Almelo. The Asito Stadion was built in 1999 with a capacity 6,900, this was expanded in 2005 to hold 8,500. After renovation of the stadium at the beginning of 2015–16 season, it currently holds 13,500 spectators.

== Honours ==
=== National ===
- Eredivisie
  - Champions: 1926–27, 1940–41
- Eerste Divisie
  - Winners: 1984–85, 2004–05, 2022–23
- KNVB Cup
  - Runners-up: 2011–12

== Domestic results ==
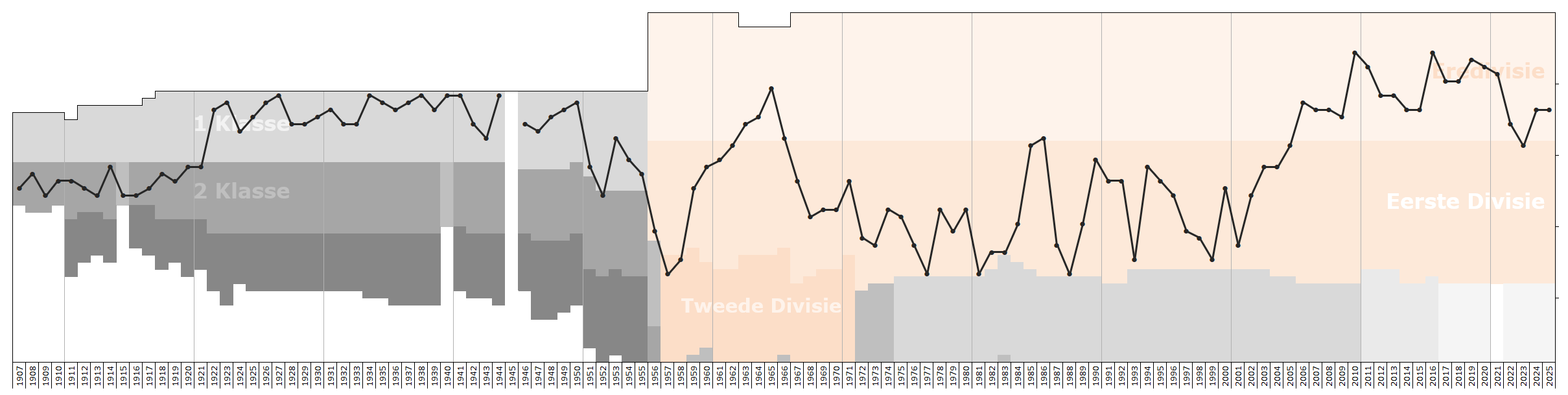
Historical chart of league performance

Below is a table with Heracles Almelo's domestic results since the introduction of the Eredivisie in 1956.

Domestic Results since 1956
| Domestic league | League result | Qualification to | Domestic cup | Cup result |
|---|---|---|---|---|
| 2025–26 Eredivisie | 18th | Eerste Divisie (relegation) | 2025–26 | Round of 16 |
| 2024–25 Eredivisie | 14th | – | 2024–25 | Semi-final |
| 2023–24 Eredivisie | 14th | – | 2023–24 | First round |
| 2022–23 Eerste Divisie | 1st | Eredivisie (promotion) | 2022–23 | Second round |
| 2021–22 Eredivisie | 16th | Eerste Divisie (relegation) | 2021–22 | Second round |
| 2020–21 Eredivisie | 9th | – | 2020–21 | Round of 16 |
| 2019–20 Eredivisie | 8th | – | 2019–20 | Round of 16 |
| 2018–19 Eredivisie | 7th | – (losing EL play-offs) | 2018–19 | Second round |
| 2017–18 Eredivisie | 10th | – | 2017–18 | Round of 16 |
| 2016–17 Eredivisie | 10th | – | 2015–16 | Third round |
| 2015–16 Eredivisie | 6th | Europa League (winning EL play-offs) | 2015–16 | Fourth round |
| 2014–15 Eredivisie | 14th | – | 2014–15 | Round of 16 |
| 2013–14 Eredivisie | 14th | – | 2013–14 | Round of 16 |
| 2012–13 Eredivisie | 12th | – | 2012–13 | Quarter-final |
| 2011–12 Eredivisie | 12th | – | 2011–12 | Final |
| 2010–11 Eredivisie | 8th | – (losing EL play-offs) | 2010–11 | Fourth round |
| 2009–10 Eredivisie | 6th | – (losing EL play-offs) | 2009–10 | Round of 16 |
| 2008–09 Eredivisie | 15th | – | 2008–09 | Second round |
| 2007–08 Eredivisie | 14th | – | 2007–08 | Semi-final |
| 2006–07 Eredivisie | 14th | – | 2006–07 | Second round |
| 2005–06 Eredivisie | 13th | – (losing IC play-offs) | 2005–06 | DSQ |
| 2004–05 Eerste Divisie | 1st | Eredivisie (promotion) | 2004–05 | Third round |
| 2003–04 Eerste Divisie | 4th | promotion/relegation play-offs: no promotion | 2003–04 | Quarter-final |
| 2002–03 Eerste Divisie | 4th | promotion/relegation play-offs: no promotion | 2002–03 | Second round |
| 2001–02 Eerste Divisie | 8th | – | 2001–02 | Second round |
| 2000–01 Eerste Divisie | 15th | – | 2000–01 | Round of 16 |
| 1999–00 Eerste Divisie | 7th | promotion/relegation play-offs: no promotion | 1999–00 | Third round |
| 1998–99 Eerste Divisie | 17th | – | 1998–99 | Second round |
| 1997–98 Eerste Divisie | 14th | – | 1997–98 | Round of 16 |
| 1996–97 Eerste Divisie | 13th | – | 1996–97 | Round of 16 |
| 1995–96 Eerste Divisie | 8th | promotion/relegation play-offs: no promotion | 1995–96 | Second round |
| 1994–95 Eerste Divisie | 6th | promotion/relegation play-offs: no promotion | 1994–95 | Quarter-final |
| 1993–94 Eerste Divisie | 4th | promotion/relegation play-offs: no promotion | 1993–94 | Third round |
| 1992–93 Eerste Divisie | 17th | – | 1992–93 | Third round |
| 1991–92 Eerste Divisie | 6th | promotion/relegation play-offs: no promotion | 1991–92 | Second round |
| 1990–91 Eerste Divisie | 6th | – | 1990–91 | Second round |
| 1989–90 Eerste Divisie | 3rd | promotion/relegation play-offs: no promotion | 1989–90 | First round |
| 1988–89 Eerste Divisie | 12th | – | 1988–89 | First round |
| 1987–88 Eerste Divisie | 19th | – | 1987–88 | Second round |
| 1986–87 Eerste Divisie | 15th | – | 1986–87 | Second round |
| 1985–86 Eredivisie | 18th | Eerste Divisie (relegation) | 1985–86 | Second round |
| 1984–85 Eerste Divisie | 1st | Eredivisie (promotion) | 1984–85 | First round |
| 1983–84 Eerste Divisie | 12th | – | 1983–84 | Second round |
| 1982–83 Eerste Divisie | 16th | – | 1982–83 | First round |
| 1981–82 Eerste Divisie | 16th | – | 1981–82 | Quarter-final |
| 1980–81 Eerste Divisie | 19th | – | 1980–81 | First round |
| 1979–80 Eerste Divisie | 10th | – | 1979–80 | First round |
| 1978–79 Eerste Divisie | 13th | – | 1978–79 | Second round |
| 1977–78 Eerste Divisie | 10th | – | 1977–78 | Second round |
| 1976–77 Eerste Divisie | 19th | – | 1976–77 | First round |
| 1975–76 Eerste Divisie | 15th | – | 1975–76 | Second round |
| 1974–75 Eerste Divisie | 11th | – | 1974–75 | Quarter-final |
| 1973–74 Eerste Divisie | 10th | – | 1973–74 | Second round |
| 1972–73 Eerste Divisie | 15th | – | 1972–73 | Round of 16 |
| 1971–72 Eerste Divisie | 14th | – | 1971–72 | First round |
| 1970–71 Eerste Divisie | 6th | – | 1970–71 | Second round |
| 1969–70 Eerste Divisie | 10th | – | 1969–70 | First round |
| 1968–69 Eerste Divisie | 10th | – | 1968–69 | Quarter-final |
| 1967–68 Eerste Divisie | 11th | – | 1967–68 | Group stage |
| 1966–67 Eerste Divisie | 6th | – | 1966–67 | Quarter-final |
| 1965–66 Eredivisie | 16th | Eerste Divisie (relegation) | 1965–66 | Round of 16 |
| 1964–65 Eredivisie | 9th | – | 1964–65 | Second round |
| 1963–64 Eredivisie | 13th | – | 1963–64 | First round |
| 1962–63 Eredivisie | 14th | – | 1962–63 | Third round |
| 1961–62 Eerste Divisie | 1st | Eredivisie (promotion) | 1961–62 | ? |
| 1960–61 Eerste Divisie | 3rd (group B) | – | 1960–61 | ? |
| 1959–60 Eerste Divisie | 4th (group B) | – | not held | not held |
| 1958–59 Eerste Divisie | 7th (group B) | – | 1958–59 | ? |
| 1957–58 Tweede Divisie | 1st (group B) | Eerste Divisie (promotion) | 1957–58 | ? |
| 1956–57 Tweede Divisie | 3rd (group A) | – | 1956–57 | ? |

== European record ==
| Season | Competition | Round | Club | Home | Away | Aggregate |
|---|---|---|---|---|---|---|
| 2016–17 | UEFA Europa League | 3Q | (Portugal) Arouca | 1–1 | 0–0 | 1–1 (a) |

Notes

- 3Q: Third qualifying round

== Current squad ==
As of 15 September 2026

Note: Flags indicate national team as defined under FIFA eligibility rules; some limited exceptions apply. Players may hold more than one non-FIFA nationality.

| No. | Pos. | Nation | Player |
|---|---|---|---|
| 1 | GK | NED | Fabian de Keijzer |
| 2 | DF | NED | Mimeirhel Benita |
| 3 | DF | CRO | Mario Borac |
| 4 | DF | NED | Damon Mirani |
| 5 | MF | SUR | Djevencio van der Kust |
| 6 | MF | GER | David Tomić |
| 7 | FW | FRA | Chafik Abbas |
| 8 | FW | GER | Mario Engels |
| 9 | FW | SWE | Vincent Poppler |
| 10 | MF | NED | Thomas Bruns |
| 11 | MF | FRA | Jeff Reine-Adélaïde |
| 14 | MF | GER | Maurice Wrusch |
| 15 | DF | ESP | David Vicente |
| 16 | GK | NED | Timo Jansink |
| 17 | MF | NED | Tristan van Gilst |

| No. | Pos. | Nation | Player |
|---|---|---|---|
| 18 | DF | GER | Max Hauswirth |
| 20 | MF | AUS | Rhys Bozinovski |
| 21 | MF | LUX | Yvandro Borges Sanches |
| 22 | FW | TUR | Tarık Hamamioğlu |
| 23 | DF | NED | Mike te Wierik |
| 25 | DF | DOM | Manny Rodríguez |
| 26 | MF | NED | Daniël van Kaam |
| 27 | FW | FRA | Jean-Paul N'Djoli |
| 28 | FW | CUW | Giandro Sambo |
| 30 | FW | NED | Diego van Oorschot |
| 32 | MF | NED | Sem Scheperman (captain) |
| 33 | GK | NED | Leco Zeevalkink |
| 35 | DF | NED | Stijn Bultman |
| 39 | FW | NED | Sil Blokhuis |
| 80 | FW | NED | Fodé Fofana |

=== Out on loan ===
Note: Flags indicate national team as defined under FIFA eligibility rules; some limited exceptions apply. Players may hold more than one non-FIFA nationality.

| No. / Pos. / Nation / Player; — / MF / NED / Walid Ould-Chikh (at Al-Arabi (Kuwait) until 30 June 2027) | No. / Pos. / Nation / Player; — / FW / BIH / Luka Kulenović (at Győr until 30 June 2027) |

== Former players ==
=== National team players ===
The following players were called up to represent their national teams in international football and received caps during their tenure with Heracles Almelo:

- Algeria
  - (Algeria) Karim Bridji (2006–2009)
  Australia
  - (Australia) Jason Davidson (2011–2014)
  - (Australia) Ajdin Hrustić (2024)
  Bosnia and Herzegovina
  - (Bosnia and Herzegovina) **Luka Kulenović (2024–present)**
  Burundi
  - (Burundi) Mohamed Amissi (2020–2022)
  Cameroon
  - (Cameroon) Willie Overtoom (2008–2013)
  Canada
  - (Canada) Rob Friend (2007)
  Curaçao
  - (Curaçao) Brandley Kuwas (2016–2019)
  Estonia
  - (Estonia) Ragnar Klavan (2005–2009)
- Finland
  - (Finland) Mika Nurmela (2005–2006)
  Ghana
  - (Ghana) Kwame Quansah (2004–2014)
  Kazakhstan
  - (Kazakhstan) Alexander Merkel (2018–2020)
  Luxembourg
  - (Luxembourg) **Yvandro Borges Sanches (2025–present)**
  Morocco
  - (Morocco) Oussama Tannane (2013–2016)
  Netherlands
  - (Netherlands) Bertus Freese (1918–1936)
  - (Netherlands) Hennie van Nee (1960–1962; 1963–1965)
  - (Netherlands) Frits Schipper (1923–1939)
  - (Netherlands) Frans van der Veen (1936–1941; 1948–1954)
- Nigeria
  - (Nigeria) Cyriel Dessers (2019–2020)
  United States
  - (United States) Luca de la Torre (2020–2022)
  Suriname
  - (Suriname) Navajo Bakboord (2019–2024)
  - (Suriname) Kelvin Leerdam (2024–2025)
  Syria
  - (Syria) Mohammed Osman (2018–2020)
  Tanzania
  - (Tanzania) Sunday Manara (1977–1978)

- Players in bold actively play for Heracles Almelo and for their respective national teams. Years in brackets indicate careerspan with Heracles.

=== National team players by Confederation ===
Member associations are listed in order of most to least amount of current and former Heracles Almelo players represented Internationally

Total national team players by confederation
| Confederation | Total | (Nation) Association |
|---|---|---|
| AFC | 3 | Australia (2), Syria (1) |
| CAF | 7 | Algeria (1), Burundi (1), Cameroon (1), Ghana (1), Morocco (1), Nigeria (1), Tanzania (1) |
| CONCACAF | 5 | Suriname (2), Canada (1), Curaçao (1), United States (1) |
| CONMEBOL | 0 | |
| OFC | 0 | |
| UEFA | 9 | Netherlands (4), Bosnia and Herzegovina (1), Estonia (1), Finland (1), Kazakhstan (1), Luxembourg (1) |

== Players in international tournaments ==
The following is a list of Heracles Almelo players who have competed in international tournaments, including the FIFA World Cup, AFC Asian Cup and the CONCACAF Gold Cup. To this date no Heracles players have participated in the UEFA European Championship, Africa Cup of Nations, Copa América. or the OFC Nations Cup while playing for Heracles Almelo.

| Cup | Players |
|---|---|
| (France) 1938 FIFA World Cup | (Netherlands) Frans van der Veen |
| (United States) 2007 CONCACAF Gold Cup | (Canada) Rob Friend |
| (Brazil) 2014 FIFA World Cup | (Australia) Jason Davidson |
| (United Arab Emirates) 2019 AFC Asian Cup | (Syria) Mohammed Osman |

== Coaching staff ==
As of 30 September 2026

| Position | Staff |
|---|---|
| Technical director | (Netherlands) Ernest Faber |
| Team managers | (Netherlands) René Kolmschot (Netherlands) Edwin Plegt |
| Commercial manager | (Netherlands) Richard Bruns (a.i.) |
| Head coach | (Netherlands) Vincent Heilmann |
| Assistant coach | (Netherlands) Hendrie Krüzen (Netherlands) Rick Antonise |
| First-Team Goalkeeper Coach | (Netherlands) Brian van Loo |
| Video analyst | (Netherlands) Leen den Boer |
| Chief scout | (Netherlands) Alfred Nijhuis |
| Scout | (Netherlands) Robin Hoogma |
| Physiotherapist | (Netherlands) Jasper Steens (Netherlands) Michel de Gruijter |
| Kit Manager | (Netherlands) Martin Dalhoeven |

== Former coaches ==
- (England) Horace Colclough (1920–21)
- (England) Ted Magner (1921–23)
- (England) Horace Colclough (1923–32)
- (England) Robert Roxburgh (1932–35)
- (England) Leslie Lievesley (1 March 1946 – 30 June 1947)
- (England) David Davison (July 1948 – February 1949)
- (England) Gilbert Richmond (1949–53)
- (Scotland) Duggie Lochhead (1953–56)
- (Netherlands) Jan Bilj (1956–60)
- (England) Michael Keeping (Sept. 1960 – 30 January 1961)
- (Netherlands) Frits van der Elst / Freek Jaarsma (1961 interim)
- (Netherlands) Jaap van der Leck (March 1961–63)
- (England) Keith Spurgeon (1 July 1963 – 30 June 1964)
- (Netherlands) Jan de Bouter (1964–66)
- (England) Les Talbot (1 July 1966 – 30 June 1967)
- (Netherlands) Toon Valks (1967–69)
- (Netherlands) Evert Teunissen (1 July 1969 – 30 June 1970)
- (Netherlands) Rinus Gosens (1 July 1970 – 30 June 1972)
- (England) Ron Dellow (1 July 1972 – 30 June 1975)
- (Netherlands) Jan Verhaert (1975–76)
- (Netherlands) Hennie Hollink (1 July 1976 – 30 June 1979)
- (Netherlands) Theo Laseroms (1979–81)
- (Netherlands) Jan Morsing (1 July 1981 – 3 November 1982)
- (Netherlands) Arie Stehouwer (1982–83)
- (Netherlands) Gerard Somer (1983–87)
- (Netherlands) Jan Morsing (1988)
- (Netherlands) Henk van Brussel (1989–90)
- (Netherlands) Henk ten Cate (21 November 1990 – 30 June 1992)
- (Netherlands) Azing Griever (1 February 1993 – 1 March 1995)
- (Netherlands) Jan van Staa (1 July 1995 – 30 June 1996)
- (Netherlands) Gerard Marsman (1 July 1996 – 30 June 1998)
- (Netherlands) Theo Vonk (8 March 1998 – 30 June 1999)
- (Germany) Fritz Korbach (1 July 1999 – 30 June 2001)
- (Netherlands) Gertjan Verbeek (1 July 2001 – 30 June 2004)
- (Netherlands) Peter Bosz (1 July 2004 – 30 June 2006)
- (Netherlands) Ruud Brood (1 July 2006 – 24 December 2007)
- (Netherlands) Gert Heerkes (2 January 2008 – 30 June 2009)
- (Netherlands) Gertjan Verbeek (1 July 2009 – 30 June 2010)
- (Netherlands) Peter Bosz (1 July 2010 – 30 June 2013)
- (Netherlands) Jan de Jonge (1 July 2013 – 31 August 2014)
- (Netherlands) John Stegeman (1 September 2014 – 30 June 2018)
- (Germany) Frank Wormuth (1 July 2018 – 16 May 2022)
- (Netherlands) John Lammers (25 June 2022 – 12 December 2023)
- (Netherlands) Erwin van de Looi (21 December 2023 – Present)
