= 2023–24 Roda JC Kerkrade season =

64th season in existence of Roda JC Kerkrade

Roda JC
2023–24 season
- Manager: Bas Sibum
- Eerste Divisie: 3rd
- KNVB Cup: First round
- Top goalscorer: League: Walid Ould-Chikh; Enrique Peña Zauner (12 each); All: Walid Ould-Chikh; Enrique Peña Zauner (12 each)
- Highest home attendance: 16,355 vs Cambuur, 3 May
- Lowest home attendance: 4,500 vs Helmond Sport, 11 August
- Average home league attendance: 10,542

The 2023–24 season was Roda JC Kerkrade's 62nd season in existence and their sixth consecutive season in the second tier of Dutch football. In addition to the Eerste Divisie, they participated in the KNVB Cup.

The club was managed by Bas Sibum, who was appointed on 9 May 2023, replacing Edwin de Graaf. Sibum, a former Roda JC player, was tasked with improving the team's performance following a 15th-place finish in the 2022–23 season.

Under Sibum's management, Roda JC displayed consistent form throughout the season, finishing in third place with 75 points from 38 matches, including 21 wins, 12 draws, and 5 losses. This marked a significant improvement from the previous campaign and positioned the team as contenders for promotion to the Eredivisie.

On 3 May 2024, Roda JC defeated Cambuur 2–0 at home in a match that momentarily sparked premature celebrations among supporters, who believed the result had secured direct promotion. However, a late equaliser in a concurrent fixture between Groningen and Telstar meant that the promotion race remained open until the final matchday. Roda JC faced Groningen in their last match but suffered a defeat, relegating them to the promotion play-offs.

In the first round of the play-offs, Roda JC were eliminated by NAC Breda with an 8–1 aggregate defeat, ensuring their continued participation in the Eerste Divisie for the following season. Despite the disappointing conclusion, individual performances were noteworthy, with midfielders Walid Ould-Chikh and Enrique Peña Zauner finishing as the club's joint top scorers with 12 league goals each. Sibum's impact on the team was recognised when he was awarded the Eerste Divisie Manager of the Season on 15 May 2024.

== Players ==
=== First-team squad ===
As of 2 February 2024

Note: Flags indicate national team as defined under FIFA eligibility rules; some limited exceptions apply. Players may hold more than one non-FIFA nationality.

No.	Pos.	Nation	Player
1	GK	NED	Koen Bucker
2	DF	GER	Joey Müller
3	DF	BEL	Matisse Didden
4	DF	GER	Brian Koglin
5	MF	NED	Teun Bijleveld
6	MF	NED	Wesley Spieringhs
7	MF	VEN	Enrique Peña Zauner
8	MF	NED	Niek Vossebelt
9	FW	GER	Maximilian Schmid (on loan from 1. FC Köln II)
10	MF	NED	Walid Ould-Chikh (on loan from Volendam)
11	FW	CZE	Václav Sejk
13	DF	GER	Nils Röseler (captain)
14	MF	BEL	Lennerd Daneels
15	DF	BEL	Lucas Beerten

No.	Pos.	Nation	Player
16	GK	NED	Calvin Raatsie
17	MF	NED	Orhan Džepar
18	MF	BEL	Fabio Sposito
19	DF	KOS	Laurit Krasniqi (on loan from Antwerp)
21	MF	NED	Rodney Kongolo
22	GK	NED	Loek Hamers
23	GK	NED	Jordy Steins
25	MF	NED	Sami Ouaissa
26	FW	NED	Arjen van der Heide
27	FW	NED	Saydou Bangura
29	FW	TUR	Metehan Güçlü
30	FW	GER	Marvin Pourié
44	DF	NED	Boyd Reith

== Transfers ==
=== In ===
Pos.	Player	Transferred from	Fee	Date	Source

=== Out ===
Pos.	Player	Transferred to	Fee	Date	Source

== Pre-season and friendlies ==
Win Draw Loss Fixtures

29 July 2023 Friendly	Roda JC (Netherlands)	2–1	(Belgium) Oostende	Kerkrade
16:00 CEST (UTC+2)	Bangura 45+3'; Daneels 90+4'	Report	Albanese 86'	Stadium: Parkstad Limburg Stadion

4 August 2023 Friendly	Jong PSV (Netherlands)	1–3	(Netherlands) Roda JC
14:00 CEST (UTC+2)

16 September 2023 Friendly	Westerlo (Belgium)	3–3	(Netherlands) Roda JC
11:30 CEST (UTC+2)

== Competitions ==
=== Overall record ===
Competition	First match	Last match	Starting round	Final position	Record							
Competition	First match	Last match	Starting round	Final position	Pld	W	D	L	GF	GA	GD	Win %
Eerste Divisie	11 August 2023	10 May 2024	Matchday 1	3rd	38	21	12	5	69	34	+35	55.26
Eerste Divisie play-offs	13 May 2024	17 May 2024	First round	First round	2	0	0	2	1	8	−7	0.00
KNVB Cup	2 November 2024		First round	First round	1	0	0	1	3	5	−2	0.00
Total					41	21	12	8	73	47	+26	51.22

Source: Soccerway

=== Eerste Divisie ===
==== League table ====
Pos	Team	Pld	W	D	L	GF	GA	GD	Pts	Promotion or qualification
1	Willem II (Note: Winner of the Second Period (Rounds 10–19)) (C, P)	38	23	10	5	77	35	+42	79	Promotion to the Eredivisie
2	Groningen (Note: Winner of the Third and Fourth Period (Rounds 20–29 and 30–38)) (P)	38	22	9	7	71	30	+41	75	Promotion to the Eredivisie
3	Roda JC Kerkrade (Note: Winner of the First Period (Rounds 1–9))	38	21	12	5	69	34	+35	75	Qualification for promotion play-offs
4	Dordrecht	38	18	15	5	74	51	+23	69	Qualification for promotion play-offs
5	ADO Den Haag	38	17	12	9	72	50	+22	63	Qualification for promotion play-offs

Source: Flashscore, Keuken Kampioen Divisie (in Dutch)
Rules for classification: Season in progress: 1) Most points won; 2) Less points lost; 3) Goal difference; 4) Goals scored; 5) Alphabetical order; End of season: 1) Points; 2) Goal difference; 3) Goals scored; 4) Head-to-head points; 5) Head-to-head goal difference; 6) Head-to-head away goals scored; 7) Play-off if relevant for deciding champion, relegation or participating in a European league, otherwise by draw. 8) Penalty shoot-out (only after a play-off)
(C) Champions; (P) Promoted

==== Results summary ====
Overall								Home						Away					
Pld	W	D	L	GF	GA	GD	Pts	W	D	L	GF	GA	GD	W	D	L	GF	GA	GD
23	12	8	3	37	16	+21	44	9	2	1	24	6	+18	3	6	2	13	10	+3

Last updated: 26 January 2024.

==== Results by round ====
Round	1	2	3	4	5	6	7	8	9	10	11	12	13	14	15	16	17	18	19	20	21	22	23	24	25	26	27
Ground	H	A	H	A	A	H	H	A	H	A	H	H	A	H	A	H	A	H	A	A	H	A	H	A	H	H	A
Result	W	W	W	L	W	W	W	D	W	D	L	W	D	D	D	W	L	W	W	D	W	D	D				
Position	1	1	1	1	1	1	1	1	1	1	1	1	1	1	2	2	3	2	2	2	2	2	3				

Updated to match(es) played on 26 January 2024. Source:
A = Away; H = Home; W = Win; D = Draw; L = Loss

==== Matches ====
The league fixtures were unveiled on 30 June 2023.

11 August 2023 1	Roda JC Kerkrade	4–1	Helmond Sport	Kerkrade
20:00 CEST (UTC+2)		Report		Stadium: Parkstad Limburg Stadion; Attendance: 6,574; Referee: Edwin van de Graaf

18 August 2023 2	ADO Den Haag	0–3	Roda JC Kerkrade	The Hague
20:00 CEST (UTC+2)		Report	Peña Zauner 11', 29'; Ould-Chikh 35'	Stadium: ADO Den Haag Stadium; Attendance: 5,895; Referee: Jeroen Manschot

25 August 2023 3	Roda JC Kerkrade	2–0	TOP Oss	Kerkrade
20:00 CEST (UTC+2)	Ould-Chikh 39'; Daneels 87'	Report		Stadium: Parkstad Limburg Stadion; Attendance: 7,631; Referee: Pol van Boekel

1 September 2023 4	Jong Utrecht	1–0	Roda JC Kerkrade	Utrecht
20:00 CEST (UTC+2)	Van de Haar 90+3'	Report		Stadium: Sportcomplex Zoudenbalch; Referee: Martijn Vos

9 September 2023 5	NAC Breda	1–3	Roda JC Kerkrade	Breda
21:00 CEST (UTC+2)	Kuijpers 31'	Report	Peña Zauner 4'; Schmid 16'; Van der Heide 90+4'	Stadium: Rat Verlegh Stadion; Referee: Ingmar Oostrom

15 September 2023 6	Roda JC Kerkrade	3–0	Telstar	Kerkrade
20:00 CEST (UTC+2)	Ould-Chikh 9'; Schmid 65'; Van der Heide 90+5'	Report		Stadium: Parkstad Limburg Stadion; Referee: Erwin Blank

22 September 2023 7	Roda JC Kerkrade	4–1	Den Bosch	Kerkrade
20:00 CEST (UTC+2)	Schmid 45'; Peña Zauner 76'; Daneels 85'; Güçlü 90+1'	Report	Didden 86' (o.g.)	Stadium: Parkstad Limburg Stadion; Referee: Sander van der Eijk

29 September 2023 8	De Graafschap	0–0	Roda JC Kerkrade	Doetinchem
20:00 CEST (UTC+2)	Brittijn (yellow card) 32'; Büttner (yellow card) 48'; Kaak (yellow card) 55'	Report	Džepar (yellow card) 90+6'	Stadium: De Vijverberg; Attendance: 11,853; Referee: (Netherlands) Martin van den Kerkhof

6 October 2023 9	Roda JC Kerkrade	3–1	Jong AZ	Kerkrade
20:00 CEST (UTC+2)	Ouaissa 33' 41'; Reith (yellow card) 49'; Peña Zauner (yellow card) 56'; Džepar (yellow card) 73'; Röseler (yellow card) 83'; Ould-Chikh 87'	Report	Kwakman (yellow card) 17'; Lewis Schouten (yellow card) 55' (goal) 84'; Dekkers (yellow card) 61'	Stadium: Parkstad Limburg Stadion; Attendance: 9,937; Referee: (Netherlands) Laurens Gerrets

14 October 2023 10	VVV	1–1	Roda JC Kerkrade	Venlo
16:30 CEST (UTC+2)	Janssen (yellow card) 62'; Doesburg 66'	Report	Koglin 73'; Spieringhs (yellow card) 90'	Stadium: Covebo Stadion – De Koel; Attendance: 6,961; Referee: (Netherlands) Jochem Kamphuis

21 October 2023 11	Roda JC Kerkrade	0–1	Willem II	Kerkrade
20:00 CEST (UTC+2)	Güçlü (yellow card) 76'	Report	Oosting 14' (yellow card) 72'; Bosch (yellow card) 54'; Bokila (yellow card) 67'; de Leeuw (yellow card) 90+5'	Stadium: Parkstad Limburg Stadion; Attendance: 10,631; Referee: (Netherlands) Marc Nagtegaal

27 October 2023 12	Roda JC Kerkrade	2–1	Jong Ajax	Kerkrade
20:00 CEST (UTC+2)	Peña Zauner 14'; Krasniqi (yellow card) 21'; Ould-Chikh 66' (yellow card) 68'	Report	Banel (yellow card) 13'; Chourak 39' (yellow card) 44'; Agougil (yellow card) 48'; Sarfo (yellow card) 90+3'	Stadium: Parkstad Limburg Stadion; Attendance: 8,312; Referee: (Netherlands) Stan Teuben

6 November 2023 13	FC Eindhoven	1–1	Roda JC Kerkrade	Eindhoven
20:00 CEST (UTC+2)	Amevor 12' (pen.); Priske (yellow card) 51'; Dahlhaus (yellow card) 71'	Report	Reith (yellow card) 12'; Spieringhs 59'	Stadium: Jan Louwers Stadion; Attendance: 2,611; Referee: (Netherlands) Jeroen Manschot

12 November 2023 14	Roda JC Kerkrade	0–0	Groningen	Kerkrade
16:45 CET (UTC+1)	Matisse Didden (yellow card) 14'; Reith (yellow card) 83'; Ouaissa (yellow card) 90+1'	Report	Jorg Schreuders (yellow card) 61'	Stadium: Parkstad Limburg Stadion; Attendance: 11,125; Referee: (Netherlands) Dennis Higler

19 November 2023 15	Cambuur	1–1	Roda JC Kerkrade	Leeuwarden
14:30 CET (UTC+1)	Smit 4'; Poll (yellow card) 10'; van Kaam (yellow card) 31'; Balk (yellow card) 31'	Report	Ould-Chikh 13' (pen.); Peña Zauner (yellow card) 43'; Bucker (yellow card) 43'; Matisse Didden (yellow card) 58'	Stadium: Cambuur Stadion; Attendance: 9,820; Referee: (Netherlands) Martijn Vos

26 November 2023 16	Roda JC Kerkrade	1–0	MVV	Kerkrade
12:15 CET (UTC+1)	Daneels 90+3'	Report	Kleinen (yellow card) 74'; Labylle (yellow card) 90'	Stadium: Parkstad Limburg Stadion; Attendance: 11,783; Referee: (Netherlands) Pol van Boekel

1 December 2023 17	Dordrecht	2–0	Roda JC Kerkrade	Dordrecht
20:00 CET (UTC+1)	Rene Kriwak 35' 79' (yellow card) 90+1'	Report	Ouaissa (red card) 64'; Ould-Chikh (yellow card) 86'	Stadium: Matchoholic Stadion; Attendance: 2,235; Referee: (Netherlands) Kevin Puts

8 December 2023 18	Roda JC Kerkrade	2–1	Jong PSV	Kerkrade
20:00 CET (UTC+1)	Schmid 42'; Peña Zauner 51'	Report	Jason van Duiven 6'; Schiks (red card) 33'; van de Blaak (yellow card) 44'; Uneken (yellow card) 48'	Stadium: Parkstad Limburg Stadion; Attendance: 7,524; Referee: (Netherlands) Stan Teuben

15 December 2023 19	Emmen	0–1	Roda JC Kerkrade	Emmen
20:00 CET (UTC+1)	Hardeveld (yellow card) 21'; Vos (yellow card) 67'	Report	Ould-Chikh 45+1' (yellow card) 80'	Stadium: De Oude Meerdijk; Attendance: 7,603; Referee: (Netherlands) Marc Nagtegaal

23 December 2023 20	Helmond Sport	3–3	Roda JC Kerkrade	Helmond
18:45 CET (UTC+1)	Botos 13' 28' 52'; Schroyen (yellow card) 41'; Michel Ludwig (yellow card) 43'; Schmidt (yellow card) 77'; Ostrc (yellow card) 77'	Report	Schmid 32'; Matisse Didden (yellow card) 41'; Peña Zauner 51'; Reith (yellow card) 64'; Koglin (yellow card) 72'; Saydou Bangura (yellow card) 77'; Ould-Chikh 90+6'	Stadium: GS Staalwerken Stadion; Attendance: 2,452; Referee: (Netherlands) Martijn Vos

19 January 2024 22	Den Bosch	0–0	Roda JC Kerkrade	's-Hertogenbosch
20:00 CET (UTC+1)	Gyamfi (yellow card) 44'	Report		Stadium: De Vliert; Attendance: 4,852; Referee: (Netherlands) Marc Nagtegaal

22 January 2024 21	Roda JC Kerkrade	3–0	FC Eindhoven	Kerkrade
20:00 CET (UTC+1)	Matisse Didden 16'; Peña Zauner 26'; Ould-Chikh 45'; Koglin (yellow card) 88'	Report	Ogenia (yellow card) 15'; Kökçü (yellow card) 61'	Stadium: Parkstad Limburg Stadion; Attendance: 6,389; Referee: (Netherlands) Martin Pérez

26 January 2024 23	Roda JC Kerkrade	0–0	Jong FC Utrecht	Kerkrade
20:00 CET (UTC+1)		Report	Nazjir Held (yellow card) 45+1'	Stadium: Parkstad Limburg Stadion; Attendance: 7,085; Referee: (Netherlands) Michael Eijgelsheim

5 February 2024 24	Jong AZ	–	Roda JC Kerkrade	Wijdewormer
20:00 CET (UTC+1)				Stadium: Sportcomplex Kalverhoek

=== KNVB Cup ===
2 November 2023 First round	NEC	5–3	Roda JC Kerkrade	Nijmegen
21:00 CET (UTC+1)	Rober 9' 80'; Mattsson 22'; van Rooij 24'; Hoedemakers 86'	Report	Ouaissa 7' 37'; Fabio Sposito (yellow card) 34'; Matisse Didden 42'; Koglin (yellow card) 45+1'; Ould-Chikh (yellow card) 90+2'	Stadium: Goffertstadion; Referee: (Netherlands) Allard Lindhout
