= 2022–23 Roda JC Kerkrade season =

Roda JC
2022–23 season
- CEO: Jordens Peters
- Head coach: Jurgen Streppel (until 15 December); Remond Strijbosch (caretaker, 17 December – 23 January); Edwin de Graaf (from 24 January)
- Stadium: Parkstad Limburg Stadion
- Eerste Divisie: 15th
- KNVB Cup: First round
- Top goalscorer: League: Dylan Vente (21); All: Dylan Vente (21)

The 2022–23 season is Roda JC's 61st season in existence and the club's fifth consecutive season in the second division of Dutch football. In addition to the domestic league, Roda JC will participate in this season's editions of the KNVB Cup. The season covers the period from 1 July 2022 to 30 June 2023.

== Players ==
As of 19 February 2023

Note: Flags indicate national team as defined under FIFA eligibility rules; some limited exceptions apply. Players may hold more than one non-FIFA nationality.

No.	Pos.	Nation	Player
1	GK	NED	Rody de Boer
3	DF	NED	Ted van de Pavert
4	DF	NED	Guus Joppen
5	DF	NED	Terrence Douglas
6	MF	NED	Lennard Hartjes (on loan from Feyenoord)
7	FW	BEL	Bryan Limbombe
8	MF	NED	Niek Vossebelt
9	FW	NED	Dylan Vente
10	MF	NED	Teun Bijleveld
11	MF	GER	Phil Sieben
13	DF	GER	Nils Röseler (captain)
14	MF	BEL	Lennerd Daneels
15	DF	TUR	Ali Barak

No.	Pos.	Nation	Player
16	MF	NED	Jesse Schuurman (on loan from De Graafschap)
17	MF	BEL	Jamil Takidine
20	DF	BEL	Xander Lambrix
21	GK	GER	Moritz Nicolas (on loan from Borussia Mönchengladbach)
23	DF	GER	Florian Mayer
25	MF	NED	Sami Ouaissa
26	FW	NED	Arjen van der Heide
27	FW	NED	Mohamed Mallahi (on loan from Utrecht)
29	FW	NED	Romano Postema (on loan from Groningen)
36	GK	NED	Loek Hamers
37	GK	NED	Dylan Vranken
44	DF	NED	Boyd Reith

== Competitions ==
=== Overall record ===
Competition	First match	Last match	Starting round	Final position	Record							
Competition	First match	Last match	Starting round	Final position	Pld	W	D	L	GF	GA	GD	Win %
Eerste Divisie	5 August 2022	19 May 2023	Matchday 1	15th	38	12	7	19	49	59	−10	31.58
KNVB Cup	18 October 2022		Fifth round		1	0	1	0	2	2	+0	0.00
Total					39	12	8	19	51	61	−10	30.77

Source: Soccerway

=== Eerste Divisie ===
==== League table ====
Pos	Team	Pld	W	D	L	GF	GA	GD	Pts	Promotion or qualification
13	Jong Ajax	38	12	10	16	69	72	−3	46	Reserve teams are not eligible to be promoted to the Eredivisie
14	Jong PSV	38	12	9	17	59	63	−4	45	Reserve teams are not eligible to be promoted to the Eredivisie
15	Roda JC Kerkrade	38	12	7	19	49	59	−10	43	
16	Helmond Sport	38	11	10	17	39	57	−18	43	
17	TOP Oss	38	10	7	21	45	76	−31	37	

Source: Soccerway, Keuken Kampioen Divisie (in Dutch)
Rules for classification: Season in progress: 1) Most points won; 2) Less points lost; 3) Goal difference; 4) Goals scored; 5) Alphabetical order; End of season: 1) Points; 2) Goal difference; 3) Goals scored; 4) Head-to-head points; 5) Head-to-head goal difference; 6) Head-to-head away goals scored; 7) Play-off if relevant for deciding champion, relegation or participating in a European league, otherwise by draw. 8) Penalty shoot-out (only after a play-off)

==== Results summary ====
Overall								Home						Away					
Pld	W	D	L	GF	GA	GD	Pts	W	D	L	GF	GA	GD	W	D	L	GF	GA	GD
0	0	0	0	0	0	0	0	0	0	0	0	0	0	0	0	0	0	0	0

Source: Keuken Kampioen Divisie

==== Results by round ====
Round	1	2	3	4	5	6	7	8
Ground	A	H	A	H	A	H	A	H
Result	W	W	W	L	D	D	D	W
Position								

Source: Keuken Kampioen Divisie
A = Away; H = Home; W = Win; D = Draw; L = Loss

==== Matches ====
The league fixtures were announced on 17 June 2022.

5 August 2022 1	Dordrecht	0–2	Roda JC	Dordrecht
CEST (UTC+2)

12 August 2022 2	Roda JC	1–0	Jong Ajax	Kerkrade
CEST (UTC+2)				Stadium: Parkstad Limburg Stadion

19 August 2022 3	Den Bosch	0–3	Roda JC	's-Hertogenbosch
CEST (UTC+2)

26 August 2022 4	Roda JC	1–3	NAC Breda	Kerkrade
CEST (UTC+2)				Stadium: Parkstad Limburg Stadion

4 September 2022 5	MVV Maastricht	1–1	Roda JC	Maastricht
CEST (UTC+2)

9 September 2022 6	Roda JC	1–1	Jong PSV	Kerkrade
CEST (UTC+2)				Stadium: Parkstad Limburg Stadion

16 September 2022 7	Eindhoven	3–3	Roda JC	Eindhoven
CEST (UTC+2)

12 September 2022 8	Roda JC	3–2	De Graafschap	Kerkrade
CEST (UTC+2)				Stadium: Parkstad Limburg Stadion

=== KNVB Cup ===
18 October 2022 First round	Roda JC	2–2 (a.e.t.) (6–7 p)	Heracles Almelo	Kerkrade
21:00 CEST	Postema 27'; Hartjes 79'	Report	47' Sierra; 52' Laursen	Stadium: Parkstad Limburg Stadion
	Penalties
	Daneels (penalty scored); Vente (penalty scored); Van der Heide (penalty scored); Limbombe (penalty missed); Vossebelt (penalty scored); Reith (penalty scored); Lambrix (penalty scored); Hartjes (penalty missed)		(penalty scored) Hoogma; (penalty scored) Bruns; (penalty scored) Sonnenberg; (penalty missed) Schoofs; (penalty scored) Sierra; (penalty scored) Rente; (penalty scored) Bucker; (penalty scored) Leš
