= Ould-Chikh =

Ould-Chikh is a surname. Notable people with the surname include:

- Bilal Ould-Chikh (born 1997), Dutch footballer
- Walid Ould-Chikh (born 1999), Dutch footballer
