= Sami Ouaissa =

Dutch footballer (born 2004)

Personal information
- Date of birth: 2 October 2004 (age 22)
- Place of birth: Sittard, Netherlands
- Height: 1.83 m (6 ft 0 in)
- Positions: Winger; attacking midfielder

Team information
- Current team: PSV Eindhoven
- Number: 11

Youth career
- –2010: Passart-VKC
- 2010–2022: Roda JC

Senior career*
Years	Team	Apps	(Gls)
2022–2024	Roda JC	42	(2)
2024–2026	NEC	66	(13)
2024	→ Roda JC (loan)	8	(2)
2026–	PSV Eindhoven	0	(0)

International career^{‡}
2025–	Netherlands U21	3	(0)
- * Club domestic league appearances and goals as of 8 August 2026 ‡ National team caps and goals as of 28 March 2026

Sami Ouaissa (Arabic: سامي وعيسا, romanized: Sāmī Waʿīsā; born 2 October 2004) is a Dutch professional footballer who plays as a winger or attacking midfielder for Eredivisie club PSV Eindhoven.

== Career ==
=== Roda JC ===
Ouaissa was born in Sittard and raised in Hoensbroek, but later moved to Brunssum. He started playing football for Passart-VKC, before joining the Roda JC youth academy as a five-year-old in 2010.

He made his professional debut on 26 August 2022, replacing Terrence Douglas in the 90th minute of a 3–1 home loss to NAC Breda. On 30 January 2023, he made his first-ever start for Roda JC in a 2–1 league defeat to PEC Zwolle, playing for 61 minutes before being replaced by Niek Vossebelt. Ouaissa's appearance made him the youngest player to start for the club in over 30 years. Four days later, he signed his first professional contract with Roda, which runs until 2025. This marked the end of a 20-year period during which no academy players had signed a contract with the club after being promoted to the first team, with Ger Senden and Mark Luijpers being the last to do so. On 5 February 2023, just one day after signing his new deal with the club, Ouaissa provided his first assist, a corner kick for Terrence Douglas' winning goal in a 2–1 derby victory over MVV.

On 6 October 2023, Ouaissa scored his first professional goals, netting a first-half brace. His performance contributed to Roda's 3–1 victory against Jong AZ and solidified the team's position at the top of the league table.

=== NEC ===
On 1 February 2024, Ouaissa signed a contract with Eredivisie club NEC until 2028 and was immediately loaned back to Roda JC for the remainder of the 2023–24 season.

Ouaissa made his competitive debut for NEC on 10 August 2024, starting in the club's opening match of the season, a 2–1 home defeat to Twente. On 31 August, he scored his first goal for NEC and his first in the Eredivisie, contributing to a 3–0 away victory over Fortuna Sittard. Ouaissa began the season as an attacking midfielder but was moved to his preferred position as a right winger in early 2025, after which he scored three goals in the first four matches of the year.

=== PSV ===
On 1 September 2026, Ouaissa signed a five-year contract with PSV Eindhoven.

== Personal life ==
Ouaissa is of Moroccan descent.

Ouaissa enrolled in a havo at the Sint-Janscollege in Hoensbroek while playing in the Roda JC academy, and to become a physical therapist after his football career.

== Career statistics ==
As of match played 11 August 2026

Appearances and goals by club, season and competition
Club	Season	League			National cup		Europe		Other		Total	
Club	Season	Division	Apps	Goals	Apps	Goals	Apps	Goals	Apps	Goals	Apps	Goals
Roda JC	2022–23	Eerste Divisie	21	0	0	0	—		—		21	0
Roda JC	2023–24	Eerste Divisie	29	4	1	2	—		2 (Note: Appearances in Eredivisie promotion/relegation playoffs)	0	32	6
Roda JC	Total		50	4	1	2	—		2	0	53	6
NEC	2024–25	Eredivisie	33	7	2	0	—		—		35	7
NEC	2025–26	Eredivisie	32	6	5	2	—		—		37	8
NEC	2026–27	Eredivisie	1	0	0	0	2 (Note: Appearances in UEFA Champions League)	0	—		3	0
NEC	Total		66	13	7	2	2	0	—		74	15
Career total			116	17	8	4	2	0	2	0	128	21
