= Lucas Beerten =

Belgian footballer (born 2002)

Personal information
- Date of birth: 5 January 2003 (age 23)
- Place of birth: Hasselt, Belgium
- Position: Centre-back

Team information
- Current team: Roda JC
- Number: 15

Youth career
- Standaard Viversel
- –2011: RC Hades
- 2011–2023: Genk

Senior career*
Years	Team	Apps	(Gls)
2023–	Roda JC	84	(2)

International career
2018	Belgium U15	3	(0)
2018–2019	Belgium U16	10	(0)
2019–2020	Belgium U17	6	(0)
- * Club domestic league appearances and goals as of 25 April 2026

Lucas Beerten (born 5 January 2003) is a Belgian professional footballer who plays as a centre-back for Eerste Divisie club Roda JC.

== Career ==
=== Early career ===
In September 2018, Beerten signed his first professional contract with Genk after joining the club's youth academy at the under-9 level. His contract was extended in May 2021, committing him to the club until 2024. In June 2021, he was one of seven academy players invited to join the first team for pre-season training. During the first friendly match of the off-season against Eendracht Termien, Beerten provided an assist for Cyriel Dessers' bicycle kick goal.

During the 2022–23 season, Jong Genk debuted in the Challenger Pro League, but Beerten was unable to feature for the reserves due to a long-term injury.

=== Roda JC ===
In the summer of 2023, Beerten trained with Dutch Eerste Divisie club Roda JC and later signed a one-year contract with an option for an additional season. On 27 October 2023, he made his official debut for Roda's first team, coming on as a substitute for Laurit Krasniqi in a 2–1 league victory over Jong Ajax. Six days later, Beerten earned his first start in a 5–3 cup defeat to NEC. He made 22 appearances in his first season at the club, establishing himself as a starter in the latter half.

== Career statistics ==
As of match played 9 November 2024

Appearances and goals by club, season and competition
Club	Season	League			Cup		Other		Total	
Club	Season	Division	Apps	Goals	Apps	Goals	Apps	Goals	Apps	Goals
Roda JC	2023–24	Eerste Divisie	19	0	1	0	2 (Note: Appearances in Eredivisie promotion/relegation playoffs)	0	22	0
Roda JC	2024–25	Eerste Divisie	13	0	1	0	—		14	0
Career total			32	0	2	0	2	0	36	0
