= Boyd Reith =

Dutch footballer (born 1999)

Personal information
- Date of birth: 5 May 1999 (age 27)
- Place of birth: Rotterdam, Netherlands
- Height: 1.76 m (5 ft 9 in)
- Position: Right-back

Team information
- Current team: Sparta Rotterdam

Youth career
- –2010: VV Groeneweg
- 2010–2019: Feyenoord

Senior career*
Years	Team	Apps	(Gls)
2019–2020	Jong Sparta	22	(4)
2020–2022	Helmond Sport	71	(2)
2022–2024	Roda JC	72	(2)
2024–	Sparta Rotterdam	14	(0)
2025–2026	→ Almere City (loan)	30	(1)

International career
2015–2016	Netherlands U17	9	(0)
- * Club domestic league appearances and goals as of 19 September 2026

Boyd Reith (born 5 May 1999) is a Dutch professional footballer who plays as a right-back for Eredivisie club Sparta Rotterdam.

== Club career ==
=== Early career ===
Reith came through Feyenoord's youth academy after moving there from childhood club VV Groeneweg. On 6 April 2016, he signed his first professional contract with Feyenoord, a three-year deal until 2019. He joined Sparta Rotterdam in 2020, having not made any professional appearances for Feyenoord.

Although he featured for the reserve team Jong Sparta in the Tweede Divisie, the move did not yield the desired results for Reith, and he cited his limited playing time as a younger player in the squad.

=== Helmond Sport ===
He left Sparta and joined Helmond Sport in August 2020, making his professional debut in the Eerste Divisie in a 2–1 away win over TOP Oss on 29 August 2020. After spending two seasons at Helmond Sport, Reith declined the offer of a new contract, opting to move on. In his final appearance for Helmond Sport, he scored a 95th-minute equalizer in a 1–1 draw with Den Bosch on 6 May 2022.

=== Roda JC ===
On 27 May 2022, Reith was announced as a new signing for Roda JC, signing a two-year contract with an option for a further year. He made his debut for the club as a starter on the first matchday of the 2022–23 season, in a 2–0 away win over Dordrecht. Throughout the rest of the season, Reith was primarily utilised as the team's starting right-back.

=== Sparta Rotterdam ===
On 14 June 2024, Sparta Rotterdam confirmed that Reith would return to the club on a free transfer from 1 July, signing a three-year contract through 2027. Reith began the 2024–25 season in the starting line-up but later lost his place, and had made 14 first-team appearances in all competitions by the end of the campaign.

On 11 July 2025, he joined recently relegated Almere City in the Eerste Divisie on a season-long loan. The agreement included an option for a permanent transfer.

== International career ==
Reith represented the Netherlands U17 team alongside notable players such as Matthijs de Ligt, Justin Kluivert and Donyell Malen.

== Career statistics ==
As of match played 28 October 2026

Appearances and goals by club, season and competition
Club	Season	League			KNVB Cup		Other		Total	
Club	Season	Division	Apps	Goals	Apps	Goals	Apps	Goals	Apps	Goals
Jong Sparta	2019–20	Tweede Divisie	22	4	—		—		22	4
Helmond Sport	2020–21	Eerste Divisie	36	0	1	0	—		37	0
Helmond Sport	2021–22	Eerste Divisie	35	2	1	0	—		36	2
Helmond Sport	Total		71	2	2	0	—		73	2
Roda JC	2022–23	Eerste Divisie	35	1	1	0	—		36	1
Roda JC	2023–24	Eerste Divisie	37	1	1	0	2 (Note: Appearances in Eredivisie promotion/relegation playoffs)	0	40	1
Roda JC	Total		72	2	2	0	2	0	76	2
Sparta Rotterdam	2024–25	Eredivisie	13	0	1	0	0	0	14	0
Sparta Rotterdam	2026–27	Eredivisie	1	0	1	0	—		2	0
Sparta Rotterdam	Total		14	0	2	0	0	0	16	0
Almere City	2025–26	Eerste Divisie	30	1	0	0	6 (Note: Appearances in promotion play-offs)	0	36	1
Career total			209	8	6	0	8	0	223	8
