= Joey Müller =

German footballer (born 2000)

Personal information
- Full name: Joey Paul Müller
- Date of birth: 30 August 2000 (age 26)
- Place of birth: Gütersloh, Germany
- Height: 1.80 m (5 ft 11 in)
- Positions: Defensive midfielder; left-back

Team information
- Current team: Waldhof Mannheim
- Number: 6

Youth career
- –2011: Gütersloher TV
- 2011–2019: Arminia Bielefeld

Senior career*
Years	Team	Apps	(Gls)
2019–2021	Wuppertaler SV	55	(2)
2021–2024	Schalke 04 II	82	(6)
2023	Schalke 04	1	(0)
2024–2026	Roda JC	79	(6)
2026–	Waldhof Mannheim	6	(0)
- * Club domestic league appearances and goals as of 17:48, 7 October 2026 (UTC)

Joey Paul Müller (born 30 August 2000) is a German professional footballer who plays as a defensive midfielder or left-back for 3. Liga club Waldhof Mannheim.

== Career ==
=== Early years ===
Born in Gütersloh, Müller began playing for the local amateur club Gütersloher TV before joining the Arminia Bielefeld academy in 2011, where he made 26 appearances in the Under 17 Bundesliga and 20 in the Under 19 Bundesliga. Promoted to the first-team squad in 2019, he was immediately loaned for two seasons to Wuppertaler SV of the Regionalliga West, becoming a regular and winning the Lower Rhine Cup in 2021.

=== Schalke 04 ===
Müller joined Schalke 04's reserve team for the 2021–22 season, the move being announced on 30 April 2021. He established himself in the side in the Regionalliga West and extended his contract to 2024 in June 2023. His only first-team appearance came on 25 August 2023, when he replaced Thomas Ouwejan at half-time of a 2–0 2. Bundesliga defeat by Holstein Kiel. Across his time with Wuppertal and the Schalke reserves he made 137 appearances in the Regionalliga West, scoring eight goals.

=== Roda JC ===
On 30 January 2024, Müller signed a two-and-a-half-year contract with Eerste Divisie club Roda JC. He made his debut on 5 February, starting a 1–0 defeat away to Jong AZ, and four days later scored twice as a late substitute in a 4–1 win over Dordrecht.

Müller spent two and a half seasons at Kerkrade, latterly as a defensive midfielder, and made 79 league appearances, of which 41 starts came in his final season.

=== Waldhof Mannheim ===
On 6 August 2026, Müller returned to Germany with 3. Liga club Waldhof Mannheim, who had been looking for some time to fill the central midfield role. Sporting director Mathias Schober, who had known him at Schalke, described him as a player with leadership qualities whose passing would help the side's balance.

== Style of play ==
Müller is a versatile left-footer, capable of excelling both as a left-back and in midfield. His adaptability on the pitch allows him to seamlessly transition between defensive and more advanced roles. Wuppertaler SV's former sporting director, Karsten Hutwelker, envisioned Müller as a key player in central midfield, particularly in the role just in front of the defense. Later on, he transitioned to a left-back position, contributing with both goals and assists.

== Career statistics ==
As of match played 20 September 2026

Appearances and goals by club, season and competition
Club	Season	League			National cup (Note: Includes KNVB Cup, DFB-Pokal)		Other		Total	
Club	Season	Division	Apps	Goals	Apps	Goals	Apps	Goals	Apps	Goals
Wuppertaler SV	2019–20	Regionalliga West	22	0	—		3 (Note: Appearances in Lower Rhine Cup)	0	25	0
Wuppertaler SV	2020–21	Regionalliga West	33	2	—		3	1	33	2
Wuppertaler SV	Total		55	2	—		6	1	61	3
Schalke 04 II	2021–22	Regionalliga West	35	1	—		—		35	1
Schalke 04 II	2022–23	Regionalliga West	30	0	—		—		30	0
Schalke 04 II	2023–24	Regionalliga West	17	5	—		—		17	5
Schalke 04 II	Total		82	6	—		—		82	6
Schalke 04	2023–24	2. Bundesliga	1	0	0	0	—		1	0
Roda JC	2023–24	Eerste Divisie	15	4	—		2 (Note: Appearances in Eredivisie promotion/relegation playoffs)	0	17	4
Roda JC	2024–25	Eerste Divisie	27	0	1	0	—		28	0
Roda JC	2025–26	Eerste Divisie	37	2	2	1	2	0	41	3
Roda JC	Total		79	6	3	1	4	0	86	7
Waldhof Mannheim	2026–27	3. Liga	6	0	1	0	1 (Note: Appearance(s) in Baden Cup)	0	8	0
Career total			217	14	4	1	11	1	232	16
