= Mohamed Mallahi =

Dutch footballer (born 2000)

Personal information
- Date of birth: 13 February 2000 (age 26)
- Place of birth: Utrecht, Netherlands
- Height: 1.81 m (5 ft 11 in)
- Position: Winger

Team information
- Current team: Pro Vercelli
- Number: 7

Youth career
- Zwaluwen Utrecht 1911
- –2011: USV Elinkwijk
- 2011–2017: Utrecht

Senior career*
Years	Team	Apps	(Gls)
2017–2023	Jong Utrecht	123	(15)
2018–2023	Utrecht	5	(1)
2022–2023	→ Roda JC (loan)	18	(0)
2023–2025	Helmond Sport	43	(3)
2025–	Pro Vercelli	23	(2)

International career
2015–2016	Netherlands U16	10	(0)
2016–2017	Netherlands U17	15	(0)
2017–2018	Netherlands U18	6	(0)
2018	Netherlands U19	6	(2)
- * Club domestic league appearances and goals as of 30 April 2026

Mohamed Mallahi (Arabic: محمد ملاحي; Berber languages: ⵎⵓⵃⴰⵎⴷ ⵎⴰⵍⵍⴰⵀⵉ; born 13 February 2000) is a Dutch professional footballer who plays as a winger for Serie C Group A club Pro Vercelli.

== Club career ==
=== Utrecht ===
Mallahi grew up playing football on the playgrounds of Kanaleneiland and Transwijk, Utrecht, Netherlands, before moving to organised association football. He initially played for Zwaluwen Utrecht 1911 and USV Elinkwijk before joining FC Utrecht's academy in 2011 at age 11. In 2016, Mallahi signed his first professional contract with the club. Early on in his career, Mallahi attracted interest from clubs such as Chelsea, Leeds United, PSV and Ajax, but chose to stay at Utrecht.

He made his debut for the reserve team Jong FC Utrecht on 24 November 2017 in a 4–2 loss to Almere City in the Eerste Divisie, after coming on for Nick Venema in the 73rd minute. He scored his first goal in professional football on 23 December 2017 in a match against Fortuna Sittard. On 13 March 2018, his contract was renegotiated and extended until 2022, with technical director Jordy Zuidam expressing his confidence in Mallahi's potential, as well as emphasising that the club had high hopes for his future development. On 30 March 2018, he put in a man of the match performance in a 3–1 win over Jong AZ, despite Nick Venema scoring a hat-trick.

As of the 2018–19 season, Mallahi was officially promoted from the youth academy to Jong FC Utrecht. On 27 September 2018, Mallahi was on the bench of FC Utrecht for the KNVB Cup match against MVV. Head coach Dick Advocaat did not substitute him on during the match.

Approximately two and a half years later, he was included in the first-team squad for the second time on 27 January 2021 under head coach René Hake. Mallahi's debut in the first team took place on 25 September 2021, during a 5–1 league victory against PEC Zwolle in which he replaced Moussa Sylla in the 78th minute. Mallahi expressed his excitement and gratitude after making his debut for Utrecht, mentioning that he had always dreamt of it and that it was a significant achievement for him as a player from the club's academy and a native of the city. After making three substitute appearances in the league and one in the cup, Mallahi scored his first goal for the first team on 31 October 2021, coming off the bench to add to a 5–1 win over Willem II.

==== Roda JC (loan) ====
On 12 July 2022, Mallahi was sent on a one-season loan to Eerste Divisie club Roda JC. On 5 August 2022, during the first matchday of the 2022–23 campaign, Mallahi made his debut for the club as a starter in a 2–0 away victory against Dordrecht at the Krommedijk, before being replaced by Arjen van der Heide in the 81st minute of the match. He provided one assist in 19 competitive appearances for Roda and returned to Utrecht at the end of the season.

=== Helmond Sport ===
On 16 August 2023, Mallahi signed a two-year contract with Helmond Sport. He made his debut for the club two days later, replacing Joseph Amuzu in the 60th minute of a 1–0 victory against Den Bosch. On 23 October, he scored his first goal for the Kattenmeppers, opening the score with a curled shot from the edge of the box shortly before the break in a 1–1 draw against Dordrecht. He was sent off in a game on 10 November, after catching an opponent with his arm in a game against Jong AZ. The Royal Dutch Football Association later gave Mallahi a two-match suspension for violent conduct.

=== Pro Vercelli ===
On 8 August 2025, Mallahi moved abroad for the first time and signed a two-year contract with third-tier Serie C Italian club Pro Vercelli.

== International career ==
Mallahi is a Netherlands youth international, and was part of the Netherlands under-17 team during the qualifiers for the 2018 UEFA European Under-17 Championship. Mallahi played alongside several other renowned players in the Dutch national youth teams, including Orkun Kökçü, Ryan Gravenberch, Jurriën Timber, Lutsharel Geertruida, Mohamed Ihattaren, Myron Boadu, and Sven Botman.

== Style of play ==
Mallahi is a technically skilled and fast winger with an excellent ability to deliver crosses, which makes him a direct threat in the opponent's penalty area. FC Utrecht's former head coach, Erik ten Hag, who would go on to manage Ajax and Manchester United, stated in connection with Mallahi's contract extension in 2016 that he plays with confidence and creativity, and he is a typical winger who takes risks to make an impact in the game.

In 2021, Mallahi stated that he had evolved as a leader for Jong FC Utrecht, due to his experience as one of the oldest players. He explained that he helped and guided younger players to adapt to the level of play in the Eerste Divisie, a role for which he thanked manager Darije Kalezić for giving him.

== Personal life ==
Mallahi was born in the Netherlands and is of Moroccan descent.

== Career statistics ==
As of match played 6 December 2024

Appearances and goals by club, season and competition
Club	Season	League			KNVB Cup		Other		Total	
Club	Season	Division	Apps	Goals	Apps	Goals	Apps	Goals	Apps	Goals
Jong Utrecht	2017–18	Eerste Divisie	19	3	—		—		19	3
Jong Utrecht	2018–19	Eerste Divisie	33	1	—		—		33	1
Jong Utrecht	2019–20	Eerste Divisie	16	1	—		—		16	1
Jong Utrecht	2020–21	Eerste Divisie	28	5	—		—		28	5
Jong Utrecht	2021–22	Eerste Divisie	27	5	—		—		27	5
Jong Utrecht	Total		123	15	—		—		123	15
Utrecht	2021–22	Eredivisie	5	1	2	0	—		7	1
Roda JC (loan)	2022–23	Eerste Divisie	18	0	1	0	—		19	0
Helmond Sport	2023–24	Eerste Divisie	29	1	1	0	—		30	1
Helmond Sport	2024–25	Eerste Divisie	14	2	1	0	—		15	2
Helmond Sport	Total		43	3	2	0	—		45	3
Career total			189	19	5	0	0	0	194	19
