= Calvin Stengs =

Dutch footballer (born 1998)

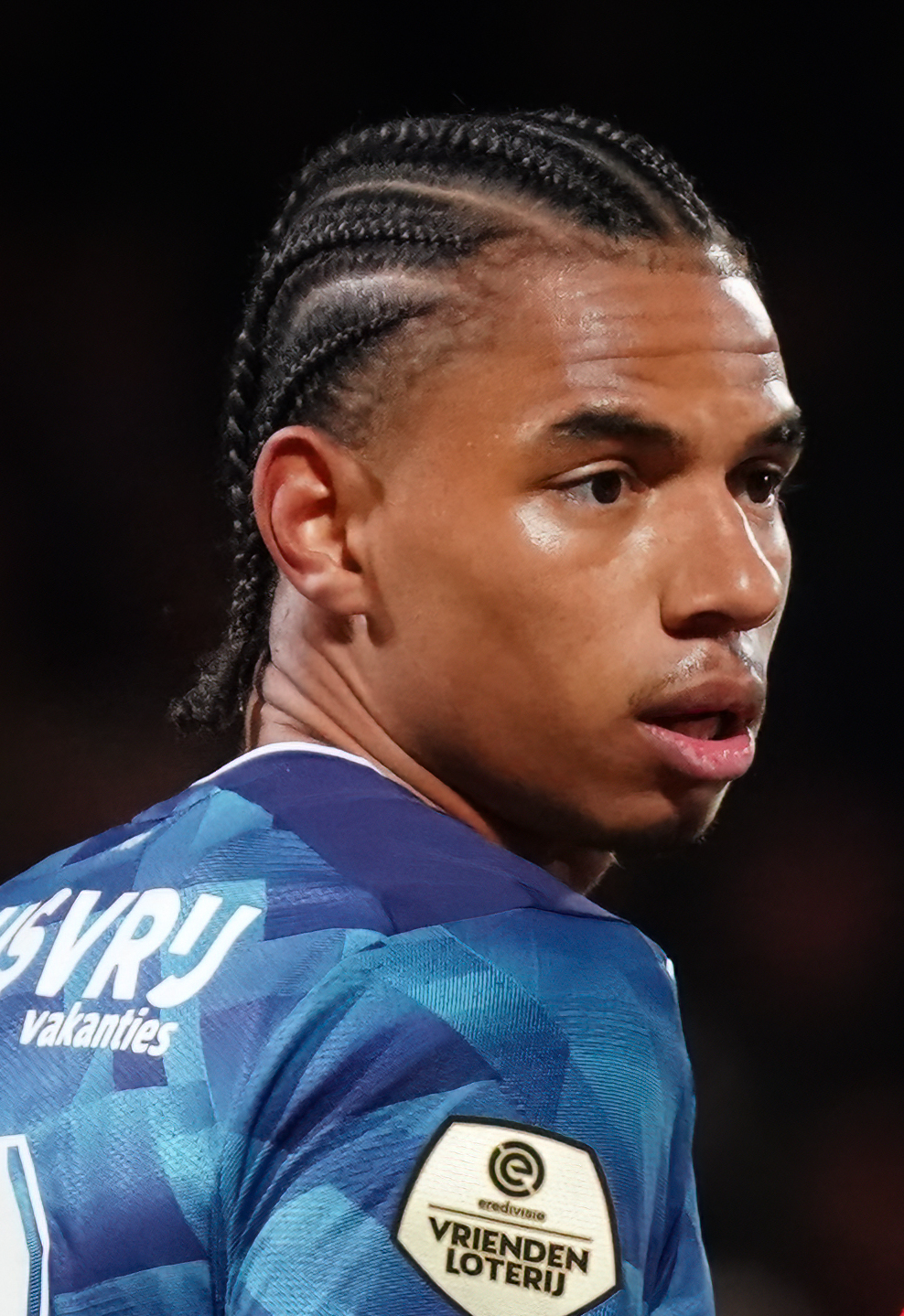
- Stengs playing for Feyenoord in 2024

Personal information
- Date of birth: 18 December 1998 (age 27)
- Place of birth: Amstelveen, Netherlands
- Height: 1.82 m (6 ft 0 in)
- Positions: Midfielder; winger

Team information
- Current team: AZ
- Number: 14

Youth career
- 2003–2007: DIOS
- 2007–2009: Haarlem
- 2009–2016: AZ

Senior career*
Years	Team	Apps	(Gls)
2016–2019	Jong AZ	24	(6)
2017–2021	AZ	78	(15)
2021–2023	Nice	28	(1)
2022–2023	→ Antwerp (loan)	25	(1)
2023–2026	Feyenoord	41	(7)
2025–2026	→ Pisa (loan)	4	(0)
2026–	AZ	10	(1)

International career^{‡}
2019–2021	Netherlands U21	7	(3)
2019–2023	Netherlands	8	(3)
- * Club domestic league appearances and goals as of 25 October 2026 ‡ National team caps and goals as of 21 November 2023

Calvin Stengs (Dutch pronunciation: [ˈkɛlvɪn ˈstɛŋs]; born 18 December 1998) is a Dutch professional footballer who plays as a midfielder for Eredivisie club AZ.

A product of the AZ academy, Stengs broke into the first team during the 2017–18 season. He developed into a key player for the club, and earned a transfer to Ligue 1 club Nice in 2021 for a fee reported to be €10 million plus bonuses. After mainly being a substitute during his first season at the club, he was sent on a season-long loan to Antwerp. There, he won the Belgian Pro League and Belgian Cup. In 2023, he returned to the Netherlands where he signed with defending Eredivisie title winners Feyenoord for a fee worth €6 million.

At international level, Stengs has represented the Netherlands, having made his debut for the senior team in November 2019.

== Early life ==
Stengs was born on 18 December 1998 in Amstelveen, North Holland, and grew up in Nieuw-Vennep. He was raised mainly by his mother, Marlies, his father having been absent for part of his childhood. His grandfather also played a significant part in his upbringing. Stengs often stayed with his grandparents in IJmuiden while his mother was at work, and he later said that his football began on a small square there.

== Club career ==
=== Early years ===
Stengs started out at the local amateur club SV DIOS, which he joined alongside Dani Gomes, the son of a youth coach there. He was scouted by HFC Haarlem and spent two years in their youth setup before joining the academy of AZ in 2009 at the age of ten. The move took him away from his familiar surroundings, and he attended school in Alkmaar from that point.

=== AZ ===
Stengs was promoted to the AZ reserves for the 2016–17 season playing in the third division. He made his professional debut for the first team on 14 December 2016, starting as a right winger in a KNVB Cup match against lower league ASWH, which his team won 2–0. That season, he made 22 league appearances for Jong AZ, scoring six goals and making eight assists. His strong performances for the reserves were noticed by first team head coach John van den Brom, and on 5 March 2017, Stengs made his league debut for AZ in a 1–1 home draw against Excelsior in the Eredivisie.

Stengs was promoted to the AZ first team ahead of the 2017–18 season, and he made his first start for the club on 12 August in a 3–2 away loss against PSV. In the seventh minute of the match he twisted his knee and tore his anterior cruciate ligament, cutting his first professional season short and ruling him out for 18 months.

Stengs returned to first team action in November 2018 and reconquered his position in the AZ starting eleven, 15 months after his injury. On 16 January 2019, he scored his first goal for AZ in a 3–0 home win over FC Utrecht. Stengs ended the 2018–19 season with three goals and four assists in 21 appearances.

On 25 July 2019, Stengs made his debut in the Europa League in a 0–0 home draw against Allsvenskan club BK Häcken. He made his first European goal in the return match in Sweden, netting in the 56th minute as AZ won 3–0 and advanced in the competition. He continued as a starter under head coaches Arne Slot and Pascal Jansen.

=== Nice ===
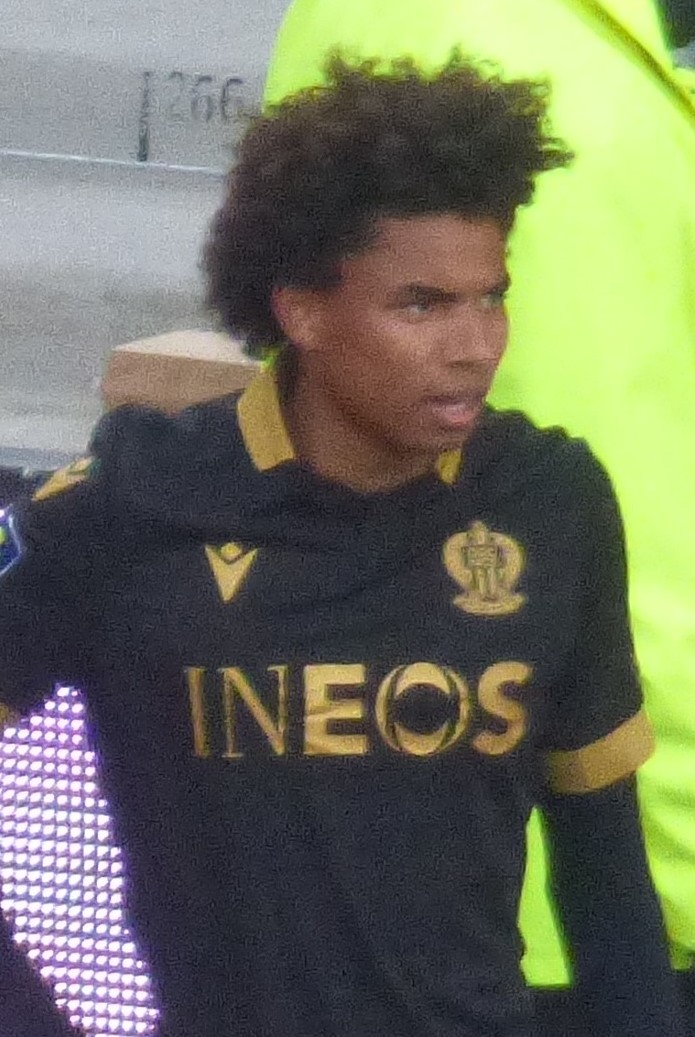
Stengs with Nice in 2022

On 14 July 2021, Stengs signed for Ligue 1 club Nice on a five-year contract for a transfer fee reported to be €10 million plus bonuses. On 28 August 2021, he made his debut for the club in a 4–0 league win over Bordeaux. He came on as a 36th-minute substitute for injured compatriot Justin Kluivert. On 25 September, he scored his first goal in a 3–0 win over bottom of the league Saint-Étienne.

==== Loan to Antwerp ====
On 30 August 2022, Stengs joined Belgian Pro League club Antwerp on a season-long loan. He made his debut on 4 September, starting in a 3–0 league victory over Westerlo. In his following appearance, a 2–1 home win against Seraing on 16 September, he recorded his first assist as his corner-kick was headed in by Toby Alderweireld. He scored his first goal for Antwerp on 10 November, contributing to a 2–2 draw in the Belgian Cup against Beveren, which Antwerp would go on to win after a penalty-shootout. His first league goal came on 27 December in a 3–3 away draw against Westerlo, completing a comeback in the 88th minute. On 29 January 2023, Stengs was sent off for the second time in his professional career in a league game against Anderlecht after a punching motion towards Amadou Diawara.

On 30 April 2023, Stengs won the Belgian Cup with Antwerp. Just over a month later, on 4 June, he won the league title with the club on the final match-day after a dramatic 2–2 draw against Genk, handing Antwerp their first league title in 66 years. Stengs was suspended for the game.

=== Feyenoord ===
On 26 July 2023, Stengs joined reigning Dutch champions Feyenoord on a four-year contract, where he reunited with Arne Slot, who also coached him at AZ. The Rotterdam club paid Nice a reported €6 million transfer fee. He made his debut on 6 August against PSV in the 2023 Johan Cruyff Shield, which Feyenoord lost 1–0. On 13 August, Stengs started in Feyenoord's opening match of the 2023–24 Eredivisie season, a 0–0 home draw against Fortuna Sittard. He scored his first goal for the club on 3 September, scoring the second goal in a 5–1 away win against FC Utrecht.

During the opening match of the 2024–25 Eredivisie, played at De Kuip against Willem II, Stengs was absent due to illness. A few days later, it was reported that Feyenoord had reached an agreement with Charlotte FC for his transfer. However, despite a medical examination having already taken place, the move did not materialise, and he remained in Rotterdam.

On 28 August 2025, Stengs joined Serie A club Pisa on a season-long loan with an option to buy. He made four appearances for the club, all as a substitute and totalling 42 minutes, his involvement limited by injury and by selection decisions. Pisa were relegated to Serie B at the end of the season, which Voetbal International described as a disastrous one for both club and player.

Stengs returned to Feyenoord at the end of the loan. On 22 July 2026 the club terminated his contract, leaving him a free agent.

=== Return to AZ ===
On 28 July 2026, Stengs returned to AZ, signing a one-year contract with an option for an extra season.

== International career ==
Born in the Netherlands, Stengs is of Surinamese descent. Stengs made his international debut for the Netherlands under-21 team on 24 March 2019 in a friendly against the United States. On 19 November 2019, Stengs made his debut for the Netherlands national team in the UEFA Euro 2020 qualifying match against Estonia, giving two assists in a 5–0 victory.

On 21 November 2023, Stengs scored a hat-trick in the Netherlands' final UEFA Euro 2024 qualifier against Gibraltar to register his first senior international goals.

== Personal life ==
Stengs's partner is Beau de Boer, a daughter of the footballer and manager Frank de Boer. The two met at the Johan Cruyff College in Amsterdam and have been in a relationship since 2017. They have two children, born in 2023 and 2026.

== Career statistics ==
=== Club ===
As of match played 25 October 2026

Appearances and goals by club, season and competition
Club	Season	League			National cup (Note: Includes KNVB Cup, Coupe de France, Belgian Cup)		Europe		Other		Total	
Club	Season	Division	Apps	Goals	Apps	Goals	Apps	Goals	Apps	Goals	Apps	Goals
Jong AZ	2016–17	Tweede Divisie	22	6	—		—		—		22	6
Jong AZ	2017–18	Eerste Divisie	0	0	—		—		—		0	0
Jong AZ	2018–19	Eerste Divisie	2	0	—		—		—		2	0
Jong AZ	Total		24	6	—		—		—		24	6
AZ	2016–17	Eredivisie	1	0	1	0	0	0	4 (Note: Appearances in Eredivisie European play-offs)	2	6	2
AZ	2017–18	Eredivisie	1	0	0	0	—		—		1	0
AZ	2018–19	Eredivisie	21	3	4	2	0	0	—		25	5
AZ	2019–20	Eredivisie	25	5	3	0	14 (Note: Appearances in UEFA Europa League)	5	—		42	10
AZ	2020–21	Eredivisie	30	7	1	0	8 (Note: Two appearances in UEFA Champions League, six appearances in UEFA Europa League)	0	—		39	7
AZ	Total		78	15	9	2	22	5	4	2	113	24
Nice	2021–22	Ligue 1	24	1	2	0	—		—		26	1
Nice	2022–23	Ligue 1	4	0	0	0	2 (Note: Appearances in UEFA Conference League)	0	—		6	0
Nice	Total		28	1	2	0	2	0	—		32	1
Antwerp (loan)	2022–23	Belgian Pro League	25	1	6	2	0	0	—		31	3
Feyenoord	2023–24	Eredivisie	29	6	5	1	8 (Note: Six appearances in UEFA Champions League, two appearances in UEFA Europa League)	1	1 (Note: Appearance in Johan Cruyff Shield)	0	43	8
Feyenoord	2024–25	Eredivisie	12	1	0	0	3 (Note: Appearances in UEFA Champions League)	0	1	0	16	1
Feyenoord	Total		41	7	5	1	11	1	2	0	59	9
Pisa (loan)	2025–26	Serie A	4	0	0	0	—		—		4	0
AZ	2026–27	Eredivisie	10	1	0	0	2	0	1	0	13	1
Career total			210	31	22	5	36	6	7	2	275	44

=== International ===
As of match played 21 November 2023

Appearances and goals by national team and year
National team	Year	Apps	Goals
Netherlands	2019	1	0
Netherlands	2020	4	0
Netherlands	2021	2	0
Netherlands	2022	0	0
Netherlands	2023	1	3
Total		8	3

Netherlands score listed first, score column indicates score after each Stengs goal.

List of international goals scored by Calvin Stengs
No.	Date	Venue	Opponent	Score	Result	Competition
1	21 November 2023	Estádio Algarve, Faro/Loulé, Portugal	Gibraltar	2–0	6–0	UEFA Euro 2024 qualifying
2	21 November 2023	Estádio Algarve, Faro/Loulé, Portugal	Gibraltar	4–0	6–0	UEFA Euro 2024 qualifying
3	21 November 2023	Estádio Algarve, Faro/Loulé, Portugal	Gibraltar	5–0	6–0	UEFA Euro 2024 qualifying

== Honours ==
Nice

- Coupe de France runner-up: 2021–22

Antwerp

- Belgian Pro League: 2022–23
- Belgian Cup: 2022–23

Feyenoord

- KNVB Cup: 2023–24
- Johan Cruyff Shield: 2024

AZ

- Johan Cruyff Shield: 2026
