= Arjen van der Heide =

Dutch footballer (born 2001)

Personal information
- Date of birth: 19 November 2001 (age 24)
- Place of birth: Heerenveen, Netherlands
- Height: 1.74 m (5 ft 9 in)
- Position: Winger

Team information
- Current team: Tondela
- Number: 26

Youth career
- –2012: Heerenveense Boys
- 2012–2019: SC Heerenveen

Senior career*
Years	Team	Apps	(Gls)
2019–2022	SC Heerenveen	38	(0)
2022–2024	Roda JC	66	(9)
2024–2026	De Graafschap	40	(6)
2026–	Tondela	10	(0)

International career
2016–2017	Netherlands U16	10	(3)
2017	Netherlands U17	4	(1)
2018	Netherlands U18	2	(0)
2019	Netherlands U19	6	(1)
- * Club domestic league appearances and goals as of 25 May 2026

Arjen van der Heide (born 19 November 2001) is a Dutch professional footballer who plays as a winger for Primeira Liga club Tondela.

== Club career ==
=== Heerenveen ===
Van der Heide was born in Heerenveen, Friesland, Netherlands, and started playing football with local club Heerenveense Boys before joining the SC Heerenveen youth academy at age 11. Progressing through the academy, he scored 13 goals in 48 appearances for the under-19 team.

On 15 September 2017, Van der Heide signed his first professional contract with SC Heerenveen, a three-year deal.

Van der Heide made his professional debut with Heerenveen in a 4–0 Eredivisie win over Heracles Almelo on 4 August 2019, replacing Jens Odgaard in the 89th minute. On 22 November 2019, he extended his contract with Heerenveen until 2023.

=== Roda JC ===
On 30 July 2022, Van der Heide signed a three-year contract with Eerste Divisie club Roda JC. He made his debut for the club on 5 August 2022, the first matchday of the 2022–23 campaign, replacing Mohamed Mallahi in the 81st minute of a 2–0 away victory against Dordrecht at the Krommedijk. On 28 October, Van der Heide scored his first goal for Roda in a 4–1 home win over Jong Utrecht in the Eerste Divisie.

=== De Graafschap ===
On 2 September 2024, Van der Heide signed for De Graafschap. He made 44 appearances for the club, scoring 6 goals and providing 5 assists.

=== Tondela ===
On 27 January 2026, Van der Heide moved to Portugal, joining Primeira Liga club Tondela on a contract until June 2029, for a fee reported to be around €200.000.

== International career ==
Van der Heide scored three goals in ten appearances for the Netherlands under-16 team between 2016 and 2017. Between 2017 and 2018, he represented the national under-17s, scoring once in four games. He also made two appearances for the under-18 team, and scored once in six appearances for the under-19s in 2019.

== Personal life ==
In 2020, Van der Heide mentioned that Antoine Griezmann of Barcelona had praised him on social media after watching some of his games.

== Career statistics ==
As of match played 29 September 2024

Appearances and goals by club, season and competition
Club	Season	League			KNVB Cup		Europe		Other		Total	
Club	Season	Division	Apps	Goals	Apps	Goals	Apps	Goals	Apps	Goals	Apps	Goals
SC Heerenveen	2019–20	Eredivisie	5	0	0	0	—		—		5	0
SC Heerenveen	2020–21	Eredivisie	14	0	1	0	—		—		15	0
SC Heerenveen	2021–22	Eredivisie	19	0	1	0	—		—		20	0
SC Heerenveen	Total		38	0	2	0	—		—		40	0
Roda JC	2022–23	Eerste Divisie	31	2	1	0	—		—		32	2
Roda JC	2023–24	Eerste Divisie	32	7	0	0	—		2 (Note: Appearances in Eredivisie promotion/relegation playoffs)	0	34	7
Roda JC	2024–25	Eerste Divisie	3	0	0	0	—		—		3	0
Roda JC	Total		66	9	1	0	—		2	0	69	9
De Graafschap	2024–25	Eerste Divisie	4	1	0	0	—		—		4	1
Career total			108	10	3	0	0	0	2	0	113	10
