= 2022–23 Royal Antwerp FC season =

Antwerp
2022–23 season
- Owner: Paul Gheysens
- Chairman: Paul Gheysens
- Manager: Mark van Bommel
- Stadium: Bosuilstadion
- Pro League: 1st
- Belgian Cup: Winners
- UEFA Europa Conference League: Play-off round
- Top goalscorer: League: Vincent Janssen (18); All: Vincent Janssen (21)
Home colours	Away colours	Third colours

The 2022–23 season was the 119th season in the existence of Royal Antwerp F.C. and the club's sixth consecutive season in the top flight of Belgian football. In addition to the domestic league, Antwerp participated in this season's editions of the Belgian Cup and the UEFA Europa Conference League.

On 4 June 2023, club captain Toby Alderweireld scored a goal in the 94th minute of the final match day to secure a dramatic 2–2 draw against Genk, handing Royal Antwerp their first league title in 66 years. The goal denied Genk the title themselves, and came just as Union St-Gilloise were conceding three late goals to Club Brugge to deny them also.

== Players ==
=== First-team squad ===
As of 31 January 2023

Note: Flags indicate national team as defined under FIFA eligibility rules; some limited exceptions apply. Players may hold more than one non-FIFA nationality.

No.	Pos.	Nation	Player
1	GK	FRA	Jean Butez
2	DF	BEL	Ritchie De Laet
3	DF	BEL	Björn Engels
7	FW	NED	Gyrano Kerk (on loan from Lokomotiv Moscow)
8	MF	NGR	Alhassan Yusuf
10	FW	BEL	Michel-Ange Balikwisha
11	FW	KOS	Arbnor Muja
14	FW	NED	Calvin Stengs (on loan from OGC Nice)
16	MF	BEL	Pieter Gerkens
18	FW	NED	Vincent Janssen
19	FW	JPN	Koji Miyoshi
21	DF	USA	Sam Vines
22	DF	ARG	Gastón Ávila

No.	Pos.	Nation	Player
23	DF	BEL	Toby Alderweireld (captain)
24	MF	NED	Jurgen Ekkelenkamp
26	GK	BEL	Ortwin De Wolf
27	MF	BEL	Mandela Keita (on loan from OH Leuven)
32	MF	GER	Christopher Scott
33	DF	BEL	Zeno Van Den Bosch
34	DF	BEL	Jelle Bataille
38	MF	BEL	Faris Haroun
48	MF	BEL	Arthur Vermeeren
50	DF	KOS	Laurit Krasniqi
51	DF	ECU	Willian Pacho
55	FW	ECU	Anthony Valencia
87	GK	BEL	Davino Verhulst

=== Other players under contract ===
Note: Flags indicate national team as defined under FIFA eligibility rules; some limited exceptions apply. Players may hold more than one non-FIFA nationality.

No.	Pos.	Nation	Player
—	DF	COD	Luete Ava Dongo

=== Out on loan ===
Note: Flags indicate national team as defined under FIFA eligibility rules; some limited exceptions apply. Players may hold more than one non-FIFA nationality.

No.	Pos.	Nation	Player
6	MF	BEL	Birger Verstraete (at K.V. Mechelen)
7	FW	DEN	Viktor Fischer (at AIK Fotboll)
15	MF	CMR	Frank Boya (at STVV)
24	DF	BEL	Dorian Dessoleil (at K.V. Kortrijk)
80	MF	BEL	Pierre Dwomoh (at K.V. Oostende)
99	FW	SUI	Michael Frey (at Schalke 04)
—	MF	BEL	Alexis De Sart (at RWDM)

== Transfers ==
=== In ===
Date	Pos.	Player	From	Fee	Source
31 January 2023	MF	(Belgium) Mandela Keita	(Belgium) Oud-Heverlee Leuven	On loan	
28 January 2023	FW	(Netherlands) Gyrano Kerk	(Russia) FC Lokomotiv Moscow	On loan	
30 August 2022	FW	(Netherlands) Calvin Stengs	(France) OGC Nice	On loan	
7 August 2022	MF	(Netherlands) Jurgen Ekkelenkamp	(Germany) Hertha BSC	Undisclosed	
5 August 2022	FW	(Kosovo) Arbnor Muja	(Kosovo) Drita	€ 400,000	
23 July 2022	DF	(Argentina) Gastón Ávila	(Argentina) Boca Juniors	Undisclosed	
15 July 2022	DF	(Belgium) Toby Alderweireld	(Qatar) Al-Duhail	Undisclosed	
29 June 2022	GK	(Belgium) Davino Verhulst	(Greece) Apollon Smyrnis	Undisclosed	
28 June 2022	MF	(Germany) Christopher Scott	(Germany) Bayern Munich II	€ 1,400,000	
18 June 2022	FW	(Netherlands) Vincent Janssen	(Mexico) Monterrey	Undisclosed	
8 June 2022	MF	(Ecuador) Anthony Valencia	(Ecuador) Independiente del Valle	Undisclosed	

=== Out ===
Date	Pos.	Player	To	Fee	Source
31 January 2023	FW	(Angola) Bruny Nsimba	(Belgium) S.K. Beveren	Undisclosed	
6 January 2023	DF	(Portugal) Dinis Almeida	(Bulgaria) PFC Ludogorets Razgrad	Undisclosed	
21 December 2022	MF	(Belgium) Radja Nainggolan	(Italy) S.P.A.L.	Contract terminated	
6 September 2022	DF	(Nigeria) Junior Pius		Undisclosed	
1 September 2022	DF	(Senegal) Abdoulaye Seck	(Israel) Maccabi Haifa	Undisclosed	
23 August 2022	FW	(Cameroon) Didier Lamkel Zé	(Belgium) K.V. Kortrijk	€ 500,000	
20 August 2022	GK	(Croatia) Davor Matijaš	(Belgium) Beerschot	Undisclosed	
4 August 2022	FW	(Belgium) Manuel Benson	(England) Burnley F.C.	Undisclosed	
4 August 2022	FW	(Netherlands) Emanuel Emegha	(Austria) SK Sturm Graz	Undisclosed	
16 July 2022	FW	(Republic of the Congo) Guy Mbenza	(Saudi Arabia) Al-Tai FC	€ 700,000	
30 June 2022	MF	(Belgium) (Democratic Republic of the Congo) Nill De Pauw		End of contract	
30 June 2022	MF	(Belgium) Sander Coopman	(Belgium) S.K. Beveren	End of contract	
30 June 2022	DF	(Portugal) (Angola) Aurélio Buta	(Germany) Eintracht Frankfurt	End of contract	
22 June 2022	FW	(Germany) Johannes Eggestein	(Germany) FC St. Pauli	Undisclosed	
18 May 2022	GK	(Iran) Alireza Beiranvand	(Iran) Persepolis F.C.	Undisclosed	

== Pre-season and friendlies ==
Win Draw Loss Fixtures

25 June 2022 Friendly	Antwerp (Belgium)	9–0	(Belgium) Hoogstraten VV	Antwerp, Belgium
16:00 CEST (UTC+2)	Frey 4', 34' (pen.); Fischer 17', 42'; Benson 59', 65', 66' (pen.); Emegha 68', 75'			Stadium: Bosuilstadion; Attendance: 0

2 July 2022 Friendly	Antwerp (Belgium)	4–0	(Belgium) K.V. Mechelen	Antwerp, Belgium
CEST (UTC+2)	Scott 47'; Benson 80'; Miyoshi 86'; Janssen 110' (pen.)			Stadium: Bosuilstadion; Attendance: 0

9 July 2022 Friendly	Red Bull Salzburg (Austria)	1–2	(Belgium) Antwerp	Anif, Austria
CEST (UTC+2)	Fernando 22'; Sučić (yellow card) 31'; Capaldo (yellow card) 35'		(yellow card) 53' Almeida; 56' Miyoshi; 65' Benson	Stadium: Sportzentrum Anif; Attendance: 0

9 July 2022 Friendly	Antwerp (Belgium)	2–2	Qatar	Saalfelden, Austria
CEST (UTC+2)	Frey 12', 70'			Stadium: Saalfelden Arena; Attendance: 0

15 July 2022 Global Tour for Peace	Antwerp (Belgium)	2–1	(Ukraine) Dynamo Kyiv	Antwerp, Belgium
20:00 CEST (UTC+2)	Janssen 7'; Benson 70'		40' Tsyhankov	Stadium: Bosuilstadion

16 July 2022 Friendly	Antwerp (Belgium)	0–1	(Netherlands) Fortuna Sittard	Antwerp, Belgium
CEST (UTC+2)			29' Gladon	Stadium: Bosuilstadion; Attendance: 0

21 September 2022 Friendly	Antwerp (Belgium)	1–2	(Netherlands) RKC Waalwijk	Antwerp, Belgium
CEST (UTC+2)	Fischer 2'		37' Biereth; 55' Kuijpers	Stadium: Bosuilstadion; Attendance: 0

10 December 2022 Friendly	Antwerp (Belgium)	1–2	(Netherlands) Go Ahead Eagles	Antwerp, Belgium
	Frey (pen.)		(pen.) Willumson; Sow	Stadium: Bosuilstadion; Attendance: 0

14 December 2022 Friendly	Antwerp (Belgium)	2–0	(Belgium) K.V. Kortrijk	Antwerp, Belgium
	Ekkelenkamp 55'; Bataille 89'			Stadium: Bosuilstadion; Attendance: 0

== Competitions ==
=== Overall record ===
Competition	First match	Last match	Starting round	Final position	Record							
Competition	First match	Last match	Starting round	Final position	Pld	W	D	L	GF	GA	GD	Win %
Belgian Pro League	24 July 2022	4 June 2023	Matchday 1	Winners	40	25	8	7	69	34	+35	62.50
Belgian Cup	10 November 2022	30 April 2023	Sixth round	Winners	6	4	1	1	12	3	+9	66.67
UEFA Europa Conference League	21 July 2022	25 August 2022	Second qualifying round	Play-off round	6	3	2	1	9	5	+4	50.00
Total					52	32	11	9	90	42	+48	61.54

Source: Soccerway

=== Pro League ===
==== League table ====
Pos	Team	Pld	W	D	L	GF	GA	GD	Pts	Qualification or relegation
1	Genk (J)	34	23	6	5	78	37	+41	75	Qualification for the Europa Conference League and Play-offs I (Note: The regular season winners will qualify for the 2023–24 UEFA Europa Conference League if they do not qualify for the 2023–24 UEFA Champions League in the playoffs.)
2	Union SG	34	23	6	5	70	41	+29	75	Qualification for the Play-offs I
3	Antwerp (C)	34	22	6	6	59	26	+33	72	Qualification for the Play-offs I
4	Club Brugge	34	16	11	7	61	36	+25	59	Qualification for the Play-offs I
5	Gent (U)	34	16	8	10	64	38	+26	56	Qualification for the Play-offs II

Source: Jupiler Pro League (in Dutch), Soccerway
Rules for classification: 1) Points; 2) Matches won; 3) Goal difference; 4) Goals scored; 5) Away matches won; 6) Away goal difference; 7) Away goals scored; 8) Play-off.
(C) Play-off I winner; (J) Regular season winner; (U) Play-off II winner

==== Results summary ====
Overall								Home						Away					
Pld	W	D	L	GF	GA	GD	Pts	W	D	L	GF	GA	GD	W	D	L	GF	GA	GD
34	22	6	6	59	26	+33	72	13	2	2	36	11	+25	9	4	4	23	15	+8

Last updated: 23 April 2023.

==== Results by round ====
Round	1	2	3	4	5	6	7	8	9	10	11	12	13	14	15	16	17	18	19	20	21	22	23	24	25	26	27	28	29	30	31	32	33	34
Ground	A	H	H	A	H	A	H	A	H	A	H	A	H	H	A	H	A	A	H	A	A	H	A	H	A	H	A	H	A	H	A	H	H	A
Result	W	W	W	W	W	W	W	W	W	L	W	L	W	L	L	D	D	D	W	L	W	W	D	D	W	W	D	W	W	L	W	W	W	W
Position	2	2	1	1	1	1	1	1	1	1	1	2	2	2	2	2	3	3	3	3	3	3	3	3	3	3	3	3	3	3	3	3	3	3

Updated to match(es) played on 23 April 2023. Source:
A = Away; H = Home; W = Win; D = Draw; L = Loss

==== Matches ====
The league fixtures were announced on 22 June 2022.

24 July 2021 1	KV Mechelen	0–2	Antwerp	Mechelen
16:00 CEST (UTC+2)	Vanlerberghe (yellow card) 23'		31', 35' (pen.) Frey; (yellow card) 50' Alderweireld	Stadium: Achter de Kazerne; Attendance: 11,565; Referee: Erik Lambrechts

31 July 2022 2	Antwerp	1–0	Zulte Waregem	Antwerp
21:00 CEST (UTC+2)	Balikwisha 68'; De Laet (yellow card) 89'; Janssen (yellow card) 90+2'		(yellow card) 43' (yellow-red card) 75' Dismas; (yellow card) 75' Tambedou	Stadium: Bosuilstadion; Attendance: 11,174; Referee: Lothar D'hondt

7 August 2022 3	Antwerp	4–2	OH Leuven	Antwerp
21:00 CEST (UTC+2)	Nainggolan (yellow card) 24', (goal) 38'; Frey 40'; Balikwisha 71', 82'; Yusuf (yellow card) 90'		27' Nsingi; (yellow card) 29' Malinov; 55' Patris	Stadium: Bosuilstadion; Attendance: 11,750; Referee: Bert Put

14 August 2022 4	Eupen	0–1	Antwerp	Eupen
16:00 CEST (UTC+2)	Christie-Davies (yellow card) 15'; Král (yellow card) 19'; Lambert (yellow card) 42'; Prevljak (yellow card) 70'		78' (o.g.) Lambert	Stadium: Kehrwegstadion; Attendance: 2,902; Referee: Jan Boterberg

28 August 2022 6	Gent	1–2	Antwerp	Ghent
13:30 CEST (UTC+2)	Kums 10', (yellow card) 90+2'; Odjidja-Ofoe (yellow card) 26'; Castro-Montes (yellow card) 82'		(yellow card) 8' Almeida; 15' Janssen; 27' (pen.) Frey; (yellow card) 86' Butez; (yellow card) 90+2' Miyoshi	Stadium: Ghelamco Arena; Attendance: 13,246; Referee: Nicolas Laforge

31 August 2022 5	Antwerp	4–2	Union SG	Antwerp
20:30 CEST (UTC+2)	Nieuwkoop 8' (o.g.); Janssen 15', 45+3' (pen.); Vines 42'; De Laet (yellow card) 81'; Haroun (yellow card) 90+3'		22' Van der Heyden; (red card) 38' Lazare; 71' Eckert; (red card) 86' El Azzouzi	Stadium: Bosuilstadion; Attendance: 12,000; Referee: Jonathan Lardot

4 September 2022 7	Antwerp	3–0	Westerlo	Antwerp
16:00 CEST (UTC+2)	Janssen 33' (pen.); Miyoshi 55'; Valencia 82'		(yellow card) 83' Vaesen; (yellow card) 87' De Cuyper	Stadium: Bosuilstadion; Attendance: 12,372; Referee: Wesli De Cremer

11 September 2022 8	Cercle Brugge	0–2	Antwerp	Bruges
16:00 CEST (UTC+2)	Van der Bruggen (yellow card) 45+3'		6' Janssen; (yellow card) 41' Nainggolan; (yellow card) 45' Vines; 68' Alderweireld; (yellow card) 85' Gerkens	Stadium: Jan Breydel Stadium; Attendance: 3,927; Referee: Lothar D'hondt

16 September 2022 9	Antwerp	2–1	Seraing	Antwerp
20:45 CEST (UTC+2)	Alderweireld 7'; Janssen 20', (yellow card) 85'; Bataille (yellow card) 50'; Ekkelenkamp (yellow card) 83'		43' Bernier; (yellow card) 78' Abanda; (yellow card) 85' Trémoulet	Stadium: Bosuilstadion; Attendance: 14,930; Referee: Kevin Van Damme

2 October 2022 10	Kortrijk	2–1	Antwerp	Kortrijk
18:30 CEST (UTC+2)	Avenatti 21', (yellow card) 50'; Lamkel Zé (yellow card) 31'; Selemani 42'; Ilić (yellow card) 88'; Vandendriessche (yellow card) 90+3'		(yellow card) 45+4' Yusuf; 90+2' (pen.) Janssen	Stadium: Guldensporen Stadion; Attendance: 7,677; Referee: Bram Van Driessche

7 October 2022 11	Antwerp	2–0	Sint-Truiden	Antwerp
20:45 CEST (UTC+2)	Gerkens 8'; Muja (yellow card) 22'; Scott 90+2'		(red card) 39' Bauer; (yellow card) 54' Brüls; (yellow card) 59' Konaté; (yellow card) 76' Janssens	Stadium: Bosuilstadion; Attendance: 15,050; Referee: Nicolas Laforge

16 October 2022 12	Standard Liège	3–0	Antwerp	Liège
13:30 CEST (UTC+2)	Balikwisha 2'; Drăguș 4'; Çanak 9'; Raskin (yellow card) 63'; Davida (yellow card) 81'		(yellow card) 12' Janssen; (yellow card) 55' Stengs; (yellow card) 57' De Laet	Stadium: Stade Maurice Dufrasne; Attendance: 21,607; Referee: Lothar D'hondt

20 October 2022 13	Antwerp	3–0	Oostende	Antwerp
18:45 CEST (UTC+2)	De Laet 3'; Ekkelenkamp 52'; Frey 79'; Alderweireld (yellow card) 88'		(yellow card) 19' Dewaele; (yellow card) 30' Rocha Santos	Stadium: Bosuilstadion; Attendance: 14,667; Referee: Bert Put

23 October 2022 14	Antwerp	1–3	Genk	Antwerp
13:30 CEST (UTC+2)	Janssen 42'; Almeida (yellow card) 72'		13' Heynen; (yellow card) 26' Muñoz; 33', 77' Onuachu	Stadium: Bosuilstadion; Attendance: 15,955; Referee: Erik Lambrechts

30 October 2022 15	Charleroi	1–0	Antwerp	Charleroi
21:00 CET (UTC+1)	Benbouali 35'; Ilaimaharitra (yellow card) 51'; Nkuba (yellow card) 61'; Bager (yellow card) 86'		(yellow card) 37' Alderweireld; (yellow card) 67' Stengs; (yellow card) 70' Ekkelenkamp	Stadium: Stade du Pays de Charleroi; Attendance: 7,000; Referee: Bram Van Driessche

6 November 2022 16	Antwerp	0–0	Anderlecht	Antwerp
18:30 CET (UTC+1)	Gerkens (yellow card) 45+3'; Pacho (yellow card) 69'		(yellow card) 52' Debast; (yellow card) 74' Amuzu; (yellow card) 90+3' Trebel	Stadium: Bosuilstadion; Attendance: 15,917; Referee: Jasper Vergoote

13 November 2022 17	Club Brugge	2–2	Antwerp	Bruges
13:30 CET (UTC+1)	Mechele 34', (yellow card) 76'; Lang 62', (yellow card) 85'; Sylla (yellow card) 87'; Onyedika (yellow card) 90+5'		(yellow card) 6' De Laet; 75' Frey; 78' (pen.) Janssen; (yellow card) 88' Yusuf	Stadium: Jan Breydel Stadium; Attendance: 29,000; Referee: Jonathan Lardot

27 December 2022 18	Westerlo	3–3	Antwerp	Westerlo
20:00 CET (UTC+1)	De Cuyper 44'; Reynolds (yellow card) 46'; Madsen 47'; Fixelles 65'		(yellow card) 21' De Laet; 51' Frey; 86' Janssen; 88' Stengs	Stadium: Het Kuipje; Attendance: 8,000; Referee: Nathan Verboomen

7 January 2023 19	Antwerp	2–0	Gent	Antwerp
20:45 CET (UTC+1)	Balikwisha 10'; Ekkelenkamp (yellow card) 57'; Janssen 64' (pen.); Bataille (yellow card) 68'		(yellow card) 44' Nardi	Stadium: Bosuilstadion; Attendance: 14,000; Referee: Lothar D'hondt

15 January 2023 20	Union SG	2–0	Antwerp	Saint-Gilles
18:30 CET (UTC+1)	Vanzeir (yellow card) 31', (goal) 34'; Van der Heyden (yellow card) 37'; Boniface (yellow card) 75'; Teuma 76' (pen.); Machida (yellow card) 79'; Nieuwkoop (yellow card) 90+3'		(yellow card) 3' Ekkelenkamp; (yellow card) 56' Alderweireld; (yellow card) 57' Stengs; (yellow card) 75' Janssen	Stadium: Joseph Marien Stadium; Attendance: 6,251; Referee: Nicolas Laforge

18 January 2023 21	Oostende	0–3	Antwerp	Ostend
18:30 CET (UTC+1)	Musayev (yellow card) 44'		11' Muja; 21' Janssen; 88' Nsimba	Stadium: Diaz Arena; Attendance: 2,902; Referee: Wim Smet

22 January 2023 22	Antwerp	4–1	Standard Liège	Antwerp
13:30 CET (UTC+1)	Janssen 8', 87', (yellow card) 45+3'; Muja 29'; Bokadi 42' (o.g.); Stengs (yellow card) 69'; De Laet (yellow card) 71'		(yellow card) 39' (yellow-red card) 53' Cimirot; 40' Alzate	Stadium: Bosuilstadion; Attendance: 14,042; Referee: Jan Boterberg

29 January 2023 23	Anderlecht	0–0	Antwerp	Anderlecht
13:30 CET (UTC+1)	Raman (yellow card) 63' (yellow-red card) 76'; Debast (yellow card) 73'; Ashimeru (yellow card) 90+1'		(yellow card) 42' (red card) 62' Stengs; (yellow card) 51' Muja; (yellow card) 63' De Laet	Stadium: Lotto Park; Attendance: 17,000; Referee: Erik Lambrechts

5 February 2023 24	Antwerp	0–0	Club Brugge	Antwerp
13:30 CET (UTC+1)	De Laet (yellow card) 62'		(yellow card) 8' Odoi; (yellow card) 54' Buchanan; (yellow card) 66' Lang; (yellow card) 71' Mechele; (yellow card) 75' Onyedika	Stadium: Bosuilstadion; Attendance: 15,416; Referee: Lothar D'hondt

12 February 2023 25	Genk	0–1	Antwerp	Genk
13:30 CET (UTC+1)	Muñoz (yellow card) 26'; Arteaga (yellow card) 63'		(yellow card) 30' Pacho; 57' Kerk; (yellow card) 81' Janssen; (yellow card) 90+1' De Laet	Stadium: Cegeka Arena; Attendance: 19,352; Referee: Bram Van Driessche

18 February 2023 26	Antwerp	2–0	Eupen	Antwerp
16:00 CET (UTC+1)	Vermeeren (yellow card) 8'; De Laet (yellow card) 22'; Janssen 38' (pen.); Alderweireld (yellow card) 42'; Ekkelenkamp 44'		(yellow card) 24' Álvarez; (red card) 36' Bessilé; (yellow card) 45+2' Filin; (yellow card) 90+2' Gassama	Stadium: Bosuilstadion; Attendance: 10,368; Referee: Wim Smet

26 February 2023 27	OH Leuven	1–1	Antwerp	Leuven
16:00 CET (UTC+1)	Þorsteinsson 34' (pen.), (yellow card) 89'		60' Kerk	Stadium: Den Dreef; Attendance: 7,726; Referee: Nathan Verboomen

5 March 2023 28	Antwerp	5–0	KV Mechelen	Antwerp
16:00 CET (UTC+1)	Ekkelenkamp 15', 32'; Kerk 42', 69'; Pacho (yellow card) 55'; Balikwisha 82'		(yellow card) 25' Bijker; (yellow card) 71' Bates	Stadium: Bosuilstadion; Attendance: 14,144; Referee: Bert Put

11 March 2023 29	Seraing	0–2	Antwerp	Seraing
20:45 CET (UTC+1)	Opare (red card) 11'; Sissoko (yellow card) 57'; Mouandilmadji (yellow card) 63'; Poaty (yellow card) 80'		15' Ekkelenkamp; 19' Janssen; (yellow card) 81' Scott	Stadium: Stade du Pairay; Attendance: 1,250; Referee: Nicolas Laforge

19 March 2023 30	Antwerp	0–1	Charleroi	Antwerp
13:30 CET (UTC+1)			15' Badji; (yellow card) 36' Koffi; (yellow card) 53' (yellow-red card) 60' Marcq; (yellow card) 55' Tchachoua	Stadium: Bosuilstadion; Attendance: 14,577; Referee: Nathan Verboomen

31 March 2023 31	Zulte Waregem	0–2	Antwerp	Waregem
20:45 CEST (UTC+2)	Fila (yellow card) 56'; Dismas (yellow card) 84'; Ndour (yellow card) 88'; Derijck (yellow card) 90+2'		(yellow card) 78' De Laet; 85', 89' (pen.) Alderweireld	Stadium: Elindus Arena; Attendance: 7,381; Referee: Bert Put

9 April 2023 32	Antwerp	2–1	Cercle Brugge	Antwerp
16:00 CEST (UTC+2)	Popović 72' (o.g.); Alderweireld 85' (pen.); Muja (yellow card) 89'		(yellow card) 29' Van der Bruggen; (yellow card) 40' Daland; 42' Hotić; (yellow card) 64' Ravych	Stadium: Bosuilstadion; Attendance: 12,091; Referee: Bram Van Driessche

16 April 2023 33	Antwerp	1–0	Kortrijk	Antwerp
18:30 CEST (UTC+2)	Muja 70'		(yellow card) 68' Bruno	Stadium: Bosuilstadion; Attendance: 12,835; Referee: Jan Boterberg

23 April 2023 34	Sint-Truiden	0–1	Antwerp	Sint-Truiden
13:30 CEST (UTC+2)	Janssens (yellow card) 18'; Bauer (yellow card) 77'		48' Balikwisha	Stadium: Stayen; Attendance: 7,245; Referee: Jasper Vergoote

==== Play-Off I ====
Pos	Team	Pld	W	D	L	GF	GA	GD	Pts	Qualification or relegation	ANT	GNK	USG	CLU
1	Antwerp (C)	6	3	2	1	10	8	+2	47	Qualification for the Champions League play-off round	—	2–1	1–1	3–2
2	Genk (K)	6	2	2	2	10	10	0	46 (Note: Tied on Points and Points without half points added due to rounding. Regular Season finishing position: Genk 1, Union SG 2.)	Qualification for the Champions League second qualifying round	2–2	—	1–1	3–1
3	Union SG	6	2	2	2	8	8	0	46	Qualification for the Europa League play-off round	0–2	3–0	—	1–3
4	Club Brugge	6	2	0	4	10	12	−2	36	Qualification for the Europa Conference League second qualifying round	2–0	1–3	1–2	—

Source: Jupiler Pro League (in Dutch), Soccerway
Legend: Blue = home team win; Yellow = draw; Red = away team win.
Rules for classification: 1) Points; 2) Points without (possible) half points added due to rounding; 3) Regular season finishing position.
(C) Champions; (K) Regular season winner

==== Results summary ====
Overall								Home						Away					
Pld	W	D	L	GF	GA	GD	Pts	W	D	L	GF	GA	GD	W	D	L	GF	GA	GD
6	3	2	1	10	8	+2	11	2	1	0	6	4	+2	1	1	1	4	4	0

Source: Jupiler Pro League

==== Results by round ====
Round	1	2	3	4	5	6
Ground	A	H	H	A	H	A
Result	W	W	W	L	D	D
Position	2	1	1	1	1	1

Source: Jupiler Pro League
A = Away; H = Home; W = Win; D = Draw; L = Loss

==== Matches ====
3 May 2023 1	Union SG	0–2	Antwerp	Forest
20:30 CEST (UTC+2)	Van der Heyden (yellow card) 36'; Teuma (yellow card) 36'		20' Ekkelenkamp; 30' Keita; (yellow card) 45' Muja; (yellow card) 60' Janssen; (yellow card) 90+3' Kerk; (yellow card) 90+3' Ávila	Stadium: Stade Joseph Marien; Attendance: 7,184; Referee: Bram Van Driessche

7 May 2023 2	Antwerp	2–1	Genk	Antwerp
18:30 CEST (UTC+2)	Muja (yellow card) 43'; Alderweireld 45+2' (pen.); Balikwisha 52'; Stengs (yellow card) 85'		20' McKenzie; (yellow card) 38' El Khannous; (yellow card) 64' Arteaga; (yellow card) 90+1' (red card) 90+7' Ouattara; (yellow card) 90+2' Heynen; (red card) 90+6' Trésor	Stadium: Bosuilstadion; Attendance: 15,133; Referee: Erik Lambrechts

14 May 2023 3	Antwerp	3–2	Club Brugge	Antwerp
13:30 CEST (UTC+2)	Janssen 36'; Pacho (yellow card) 41'; Kerk 86'; Vermeeren 90+7'		2' Mata; 23' Vanaken; (yellow card) 53' Lang; (yellow card) 59' Sylla; (yellow card) 79' Meijer; (yellow card) 87' Nielsen	Stadium: Bosuilstadion; Attendance: 16,039; Referee: Nathan Verboomen

21 May 2023 4	Club Brugge	2–0	Antwerp	Bruges
13:30 CEST (UTC+2)	Odoi (yellow card) 44'; Nielsen 51', 62'; Mignolet (yellow card) 77'; Lang (yellow card) 90+4'		(yellow card) 21' Vermeeren; (yellow card) 66' Stengs; (yellow card) 90+4' Alderweireld	Stadium: Jan Breydel Stadium; Attendance: 20,772; Referee: Bram Van Driessche

28 May 2023 5	Antwerp	1–1	Union SG	Antwerp
13:30 CEST (UTC+2)	Janssen 14', (yellow card) 62'; Stengs (yellow card) 40'		(yellow card) 44' El Azzouzi; (red card) 57' Lynen; (yellow card) 76' Nieuwkoop; 80' Puertas; (yellow card) 90+3' Sykes	Stadium: Bosuilstadion; Attendance: 16,144; Referee: Erik Lambrechts

4 June 2023 6	Genk	2–2	Antwerp	Genk
18:30 CEST (UTC+2)	Arokodare 45'; Paintsil (yellow card) 69'; Heynen 75'		(yellow card) 47', (goal) 58' Kerk; (yellow card) 65' (yellow-red card) 90+6' Balikwisha; 90+4' Alderweireld	Stadium: Cegeka Arena; Attendance: 22,196; Referee: Nathan Verboomen

=== Belgian Cup ===
10 November 2022 Sixth round	Beveren (2)	2–2 (a.e.t.) (2–4 p)	Antwerp	Beveren
20:00 CET (UTC+1)	Vukotić (yellow card) 12'; Ribeiro Costa (yellow card) 23'; Ismaheel (yellow card) 25'; Tshimanga (yellow card) 44'; Mbokani 67', 80'; Bateau (yellow card) 69'		(red card) 12' Janssen; 45+1' Stengs; (yellow card) 78' De Laet; 86' (o.g.) Tshimanga; (yellow card) 118' Frey; (yellow card) 120+1' Krasniqi	Stadium: Freethiel Stadion; Referee: Wesli De Cremer
	Penalties
	Hoggas (penalty missed); Mbokani (penalty missed); Kablan (penalty scored); Barry (penalty scored)		(penalty scored) Frey; (penalty scored) Muja; (penalty scored) Nsimba; (penalty scored) Balikwisha

20 December 2022 Seventh round	Antwerp	4–0	Standard Liège	Antwerp
20:45 CET (UTC+1)	Bataille 16'; Frey 55'; Muja 59'; Stengs 79'		(yellow card) 23' (yellow-red card) 66' Dussenne; (yellow card) 41' Drăguș	Stadium: Bosuilstadion; Attendance: 16,649; Referee: Jan Boterberg

11 January 2023 Quarter-finals	Genk	0–3	Antwerp	Genk
20:45 CET (UTC+1)	Muñoz (yellow card) 39'; Paintsil (yellow card) 60'		3' Janssen; 42' De Laet; 50' Balikwisha; (yellow card) 79' Stengs	Stadium: Cegeka Arena; Attendance: 11,041; Referee: Erik Lambrechts

1 February 2023 Semi-final 1st leg	Union SG	1–0	Antwerp	Saint-Gilles
20:45 CET (UTC+1)	Lynen (yellow card) 24'; Nieuwkoop 84'		(yellow card) 79' Bataille; (yellow card) 88' Kerk	Stadium: Joseph Marien Stadium; Attendance: 6,871; Referee: Jonathan Lardot

2 March 2023 Semi-final 2nd leg	Antwerp	1–0 (1–1 agg.) (4–3 p)	Union SG	Antwerp
20:45 CET (UTC+1)	Bataille (yellow card) 21'; Janssen 56'; De Laet (yellow card) 73'; Keita (yellow card) 109'		(yellow card) 28' Nieuwkoop; (yellow card) 55' El Azzouzi; (yellow card) 56' Lynen; (yellow card) 114' Burgess; (yellow card) 120+1' Kandouss	Stadium: Bosuilstadion; Attendance: 15,000; Referee: Lawrence Visser
	Penalties
	Janssen (penalty missed); Keita (penalty scored); Muja (penalty scored); Corbanie (penalty scored); Ávila (penalty scored)		(penalty scored) Nilsson; (penalty scored) Puertas; (penalty missed) Adingra; (penalty scored) Nieuwkoop; (penalty missed) Teuma

30 April 2023 Final	KV Mechelen	0–2	Antwerp	Brussels
14:30 CEST (UTC+2)	Lavalée (yellow card) 43'		(yellow card) 6' Bataille; (yellow card) 9' Alderweireld; 35' (pen.) Janssen; 81', (yellow card) 87' Balikwisha; (yellow card) 86' De Laet	Stadium: King Baudouin Stadium; Attendance: 41,500; Referee: Jonathan Lardot

=== UEFA Europa Conference League ===
==== Second qualifying round ====
The draw for the second qualifying round was held on 15 June 2022.

21 July 2022 First leg	Antwerp (Belgium)	0–0	(Kosovo) FC Drita	Antwerp, Belgium
19:00 CEST (UTC+2)	Yusuf (yellow card) 54'		(yellow card) 70' Blakçori; (yellow card) 79' Namani	Stadium: Bosuilstadion; Attendance: 8,215; Referee: Philip Farrugia (Malta)

28 July 2022 Second leg	FC Drita (Kosovo)	0–2 (0–2 agg.)	(Belgium) Antwerp	Pristina, Kosovo
20:00 CEST (UTC+2)	B. Krasniqi (yellow card) 36'; Jashari (yellow card) 81'; Limani (yellow card) 90+1'		52' Krasniqi; (yellow card) 65' Gerkens; (yellow card) 68' Janssen; (yellow card) 90+6' Verstraete; 90+8' Balikwisha	Stadium: Fadil Vokrri Stadium; Attendance: 9,432; Referee: Sander van der Eijk (Netherlands)

==== Third qualifying round ====
The draw for the third qualifying round was held on 18 July 2022.

4 August 2022 First leg	Lillestrøm SK (Norway)	1–3	(Belgium) Antwerp	Lillestrøm, Norway
19:00 CEST (UTC+2)	Friðjónsson (yellow card) 34'; Knudsen 45+3'; Ibrahimaj (yellow card) 49'		5' Almeida; 50', 86' Nainggolan; (yellow card) 62' Janssen; (yellow card) 68' Gerkens; (yellow card) 85' Valencia	Stadium: Åråsen Stadion; Attendance: 4,927; Referee: Daniel Stefański (Poland)

11 August 2022 Second leg	Antwerp (Belgium)	2–0 (5–1 agg.)	(Norway) Lillestrøm SK	Antwerp, Belgium
19:30 CEST (UTC+2)	Valencia 11'; Janssen (yellow card) 66'; Verstraete 69', (yellow card) 71'		(yellow card) 81' Helland; (yellow card) 84' Svendsen	Stadium: Bosuilstadion; Attendance: 9,586; Referee: Duje Strukan (Croatia)

==== Play-off round ====
The draw for the play-off round was held on 2 August 2022.

18 August 2022 First leg	İstanbul Başakşehir (Turkey)	1–1	(Belgium) Antwerp	Fatih Terim Stadium, Istanbul
19:45 (20:45 TRT)	Gürler (yellow card) 37'; Chouiar 54'	Report	(yellow card) 40' Frey; (yellow card) 43' Pacho; (yellow card) 51' Gerkens; 88' Almeida	Attendance: 3,450; Referee: Jérôme Brisard (France)

25 August 2022 Second leg	Antwerp (Belgium)	1–3 (2–4 agg.)	(Turkey) İstanbul Başakşehir	Antwerp, Belgium
20:45 CEST (UTC+2)	Frey 56' (pen.); Verstraete (yellow card) 80'; Alderweireld (yellow card) 82'		8' Özcan; (yellow card) 19' Tekdemir; (yellow card) 42' Babacan; 58', (yellow card) 59' Okaka; (yellow card) 66' Biglia; (yellow card) 82' Türüç; 83', (yellow card) 84' Aleksić	Stadium: Bosuilstadion; Attendance: 12,955; Referee: Manuel Schüttengruber (Austria)

=== Goalscorers ===
Rank	No.	Pos	Nat	Name	First Division A	Belgian Cup	Europa Conference League	Total
1	18	FW	(Netherlands)	Vincent Janssen	18	3	0	21
2	10	FW	(Belgium)	Michel-Ange Balikwisha	7	2	1	10
3	99	FW	(Switzerland)	Michael Frey	7	1	1	9
4	23	DF	(Belgium)	Toby Alderweireld	7	0	0	7
5	7	FW	(Netherlands)	Gyrano Kerk	6	0	0	6
5	24	MF	(Netherlands)	Jurgen Ekkelenkamp	6	0	0	6
7	11	FW	(Kosovo)	Arbnor Muja	3	1	0	4
8	4	MF	(Belgium)	Radja Nainggolan	1	0	2	3
8	14	FW	(Netherlands)	Calvin Stengs	1	2	0	3
10	2	DF	(Belgium)	Ritchie De Laet	1	1	0	2
10	55	FW	(Ecuador)	Anthony Valencia	1	0	1	2
10	61	DF	(Portugal)	Dinis Almeida	0	0	2	2
13	6	MF	(Belgium)	Birger Verstraete	0	0	1	1
13	16	MF	(Belgium)	Pieter Gerkens	1	0	0	1
13	17	FW	(Angola)	Bruny Nsimba	1	0	0	1
13	19	FW	(Japan)	Koji Miyoshi	1	0	0	1
13	20	MF	(Belgium)	Mandela Keita	1	0	0	1
13	21	DF	(United States)	Sam Vines	1	0	0	1
13	32	MF	(Germany)	Christopher Scott	1	0	0	1
13	34	DF	(Belgium)	Jelle Bataille	0	1	0	1
13	48	MF	(Belgium)	Arthur Vermeeren	1	0	0	1
13	50	DF	(Kosovo)	Laurit Krasniqi	0	0	1	1
Own goals					4	1	0	5
Totals					69	12	9	90
