= Koen Bucker =

Dutch footballer (born 1996)

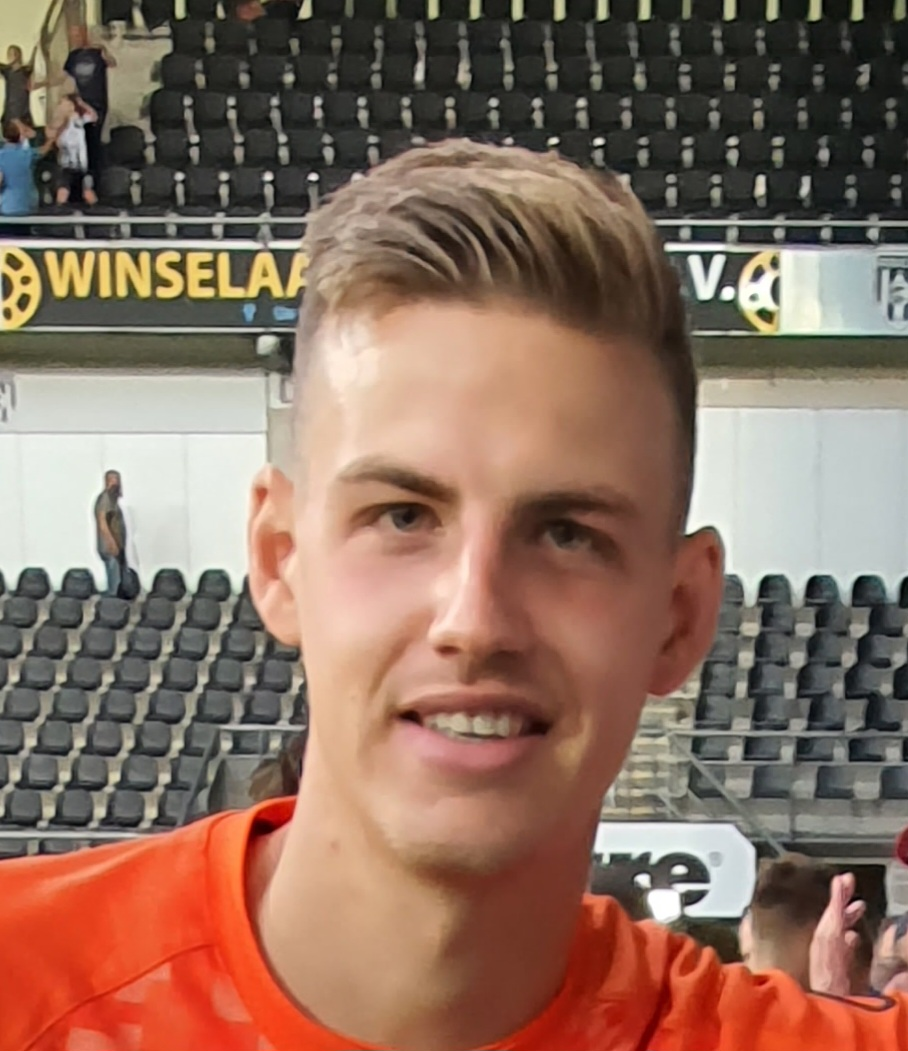
- Bucker in 2023

Personal information
- Date of birth: 18 June 1996 (age 30)
- Place of birth: Wormer, Netherlands
- Height: 1.98 m (6 ft 6 in)
- Position: Goalkeeper

Team information
- Current team: Emmen
- Number: 1

Youth career
- WSV '30
- 2011–2016: AZ

Senior career*
Years	Team	Apps	(Gls)
2016–2018	Jong AZ	5	(0)
2018–2023	Heracles Almelo	14	(0)
2023–2025	Roda JC	22	(0)
2025–2026	Emmen	3	(0)
2026–	Koninklijke HFC	6	(0)
- * Club domestic league appearances and goals as of 11:18, 24 October 2026 (UTC)

Koen Bucker (born 18 June 1996) is a Dutch professional footballer who plays as a goalkeeper for Tweede Divisie club Koninklijke HFC.

== Career ==
=== Jong AZ ===
Bucker was born in Wormer, and began his football journey in the youth teams of WSV '30 and later joined the ranks of AZ's youth setup in 2011.

In 2015, he received a promotion to the club's reserves, Jong AZ. While he made three appearances for Jong AZ, he primarily served as the backup to Nick Olij during the 2016–17 season, a campaign that culminated in Jong AZ clinching the Tweede Divisie championship and promotion to the Eerste Divisie. Bucker made his professional debut with Jong AZ in a 1–0 loss to RKC Waalwijk on 12 January 2018.

=== Heracles Almelo ===
On 31 July 2018, Bucker signed with Eredivisie club Heracles Almelo on a two-year deal with an option for an additional season. He was slated to take over as the third goalkeeper on the depth chart, following the retirement of Harm Zeinstra on the same day.

In 2020, Bucker was promoted to backup goalkeeper for Heracles. On 1 November 2020, Bucker made his Eredivisie debut for the club, as Janis Blaswich and Michael Brouwer were absent. He started in a 4–1 victory against Utrecht, in what newspaper Tubantia described as an "outstanding debut".

=== Roda JC ===
On 14 August 2023, Bucker joined Eerste Divisie club Roda JC on a two-year contract with the option for a further year. There, he was set to compete with Rody de Boer for starting goalkeeper position. Four days later, Bucker made his debut for Roda as a starter in a 3–0 away victory against ADO Den Haag, confirming himself as first goalkeeper on the depth chart for De Koempels. In December 2023, he suffered an arm injury, which ruled him out for several months.

In May 2025, Roda JC announced that Bucker would depart the club at the end of the 2024–25 season, following the decision not to activate the option to extend his contract.

=== Emmen ===
On 7 August 2025, Bucker signed a one-year contract with Eerste Divisie club Emmen, including an option for a further season, after training with the first team during pre-season. He joined the squad as the designated understudy to first-choice goalkeeper Luca Unbehaun.

Bucker made his competitive debut for Emmen on 28 October 2025 in the first round of the KNVB Cup, starting in a 1–0 defeat to amateur fourth-tier side Hoogeveen. The decisive goal came from a penalty awarded after a foul committed by Bucker, a decision he disputed after the match, arguing that the opposing forward had gone to ground too easily.

=== Koninklijke HFC ===
On 9 June 2026, Bucker signed a one-year contract with Koninklijke HFC, an amateur club in the third-tier Tweede Divisie.

== Career statistics ==
As of match played 3 April 2026

Appearances and goals by club, season and competition
Club	Season	League			National cup		Other		Total	
Club	Season	Division	Apps	Goals	Apps	Goals	Apps	Goals	Apps	Goals
Jong AZ	2016–17	Tweede Divisie	3	0	—		—		3	0
Jong AZ	2017–18	Eerste Divisie	2	0	—		—		2	0
Jong AZ	Total		5	0	—		—		5	0
Heracles Almelo	2020–21	Eredivisie	2	0	0	0	—		2	0
Heracles Almelo	2021–22	Eredivisie	12	0	2	0	2 (Note: Appearances in Eredivisie promotion/relegation playoffs)	0	16	0
Heracles Almelo	2022–23	Eerste Divisie	0	0	1	0	—		1	0
Heracles Almelo	Total		14	0	3	0	2	0	19	0
Roda JC	2023–24	Eerste Divisie	17	0	0	0	1	0	18	0
Roda JC	2024–25	Eerste Divisie	5	0	0	0	—		5	0
Roda JC	Total		22	0	0	0	1	0	23	0
Emmen	2025–26	Eerste Divisie	3	0	1	0	—		4	0
Koninklijke HFC	2026–27	Tweede Divisie	0	0	0	0	—		0	0
Career total			44	0	4	0	3	0	51	0

== Honours ==
Jong AZ

- Tweede Divisie: 2016–17

Heracles Almelo

- Eerste Divisie: 2022–23
