= Laurit Krasniqi =

Kosovan footballer (born 2001)

Personal information
- Date of birth: 14 July 2001 (age 25)
- Place of birth: Ferizaj, Kosovo under UN administration
- Height: 1.69 m (5 ft 7 in)
- Position: Left-back

Team information
- Current team: Panevėžys
- Number: 50

Youth career
- 2013–2022: Antwerp

Senior career*
Years	Team	Apps	(Gls)
2022–2025	Antwerp	1	(0)
2022–2025	→ Young Reds	30	(2)
2023–2024	→ Roda JC (loan)	3	(0)
2025–	Panevėžys	36	(1)
- * Club domestic league appearances and goals as of 10 November 2025

Laurit Krasniqi (born 14 July 2001) is a Kosovan professional footballer who plays as a left-back for Lithuanian A Lyga club Panevėžys.

== Club career ==
=== Antwerp ===
Krasniqi is a product of Antwerp with which he started playing at the age of 12 and played with all the youth teams of this team. On 2 April 2021, Krasniqi signed his first professional contract with first team after agreeing to a one-year deal with the possibility of extension. His senior debut with Antwerp came on 22 May 2022 in a 1–0 away win against Union SG after coming on as a substitute at 90th minute in place of Koji Miyoshi. On 28 July 2022, Krasniqi scored his first goal for Antwerp in his third appearance for the club in a 2–0 away win over Drita in 2022–23 UEFA Europa Conference League second qualifying round.

==== Loan to Roda JC ====
On 14 August 2023, Krasniqi joined Dutch Eerste Divisie club Roda JC, on a season-long loan deal. He made his debut for Roda in a 3–0 away victory against ADO Den Haag.

=== Panevėžys ===
On 5 January 2025 he left Antwerp by mutual consent; on the same day he joined Panevėžys.

== International career ==
In July 2022, through a private communication with a fan that was published on social networks, Krasniqi declared that he was waiting for an invitation from Kosovo. On 29 July 2022, the Football Federation of Kosovo announced that Krasniqi had decided to represent their country.

== Personal life ==
Krasniqi was born in Ferizaj, and raised in England and Belgium to Kosovo Albanian parents.

== Career statistics ==
As of match played 27 October 2023

Appearances and goals by club, season and competition
Club	Season	League			National cup		Europe		Other		Total	
Club	Season	Division	Apps	Goals	Apps	Goals	Apps	Goals	Apps	Goals	Apps	Goals
Antwerp	2021–22	Belgian Pro League	1	0	0	0	—		—		1	0
Antwerp	2022–23	Belgian Pro League	0	0	1	0	3 (Note: Appearances in UEFA Europa Conference League)	1	—		4	1
Antwerp	Total		1	0	1	0	3	1	—		5	1
Young Reds	2022–23	National Division 1	19	1	—		—		—		19	1
Roda JC (loan)	2023–24	Eerste Divisie	3	0	0	0	—		—		15	2
Career total			23	1	1	0	3	1	—		27	2
