= Enrique Peña Zauner =

Venezuelan footballer (born 2000)

Personal information
- Full name: Enrique Manuel Peña Zauner
- Date of birth: 4 March 2000 (age 26)
- Place of birth: Offenbach am Main, Germany
- Height: 1.77 m (5 ft 10 in)
- Positions: Winger; attacking midfielder

Team information
- Current team: Marítimo
- Number: 7

Youth career
- 2006–2007: SG Rosenhöhe Offenbach
- 2007–2017: Eintracht Frankfurt
- 2017–2019: Borussia Dortmund

Senior career*
Years	Team	Apps	(Gls)
2019–2021	SV Sandhausen	16	(1)
2019	SV Sandhausen II	3	(0)
2021–2023	Eintracht Braunschweig	30	(4)
2023–2025	Roda JC	58	(13)
2025–	Marítimo	28	(2)

International career
2015–2016	Germany U16	3	(1)
2018–2019	Venezuela U20	11	(1)
- * Club domestic league appearances and goals as of 19 June 2026

Enrique Manuel Peña Zauner (Note: In this Spanish name, the first or paternal surname is Peña and the second or maternal family name is Zauner.) (born 4 March 2000) is a professional footballer who plays as a winger or attacking midfielder for Primeira Liga club Marítimo. Born in Germany, Peña has represented Venezuela internationally.

== Club career ==
=== Early years ===
Peña Zauner, son of a Venezuelan father and a German mother, was born in Offenbach am Main, Hesse, Germany, where he attended school until the age of 17. He joined the local football club, SG Rosenhöhe Offenbach, before making a move to Eintracht Frankfurt's youth academy. In the summer of 2017, he joined Borussia Dortmund's under-19 team. Initially sidelined due to a fatigue fracture, Peña Zauner later made 13 appearances in the West division of the Under 19 Bundesliga, scoring two goals. The under-19 team of Dortmund qualified for the play-offs but was eliminated by the eventual champions, Hertha BSC.

During the following season, he had a breakout performance, scoring eight goals in 22 matches. He also scored one goal in six games in the UEFA Youth League and another goal in four matches in the DFB-Pokal for youths. In the nationwide championship final, Peña Zauner scored two goals in three matches, contributing strongly to Dortmund winning the Under 19 Bundesliga.

=== SV Sandhausen ===
On 12 June 2019, Peña Zauner signed a three-year contract with 2. Bundesliga club SV Sandhausen, despite receiving offers from Royal Excel Mouscron and LASK in top tiers abroad. He made his professional debut for SV Sandhausen in the 2. Bundesliga on 27 July 2019, coming on as a substitute in the 87th minute for Mario Engels in the away match against Holstein Kiel, which finished as a 1–1 draw. At 19 years and 263 days old, he became the youngest ever player to make his debut for Sandhausen.

In his first year as a professional, he failed to establish himself as a starter in the team. He made five appearances as a substitute in the league under the head coach Uwe Koschinat, in which he scored one goal. Additionally, he played three games for the second team in the fifth-tier Oberliga Baden-Württemberg. The following season, Peña Zauner also could not secure a regular spot in the first team. He made 11 substitute appearances under Koschinat and his successors, Michael Schiele, as well as coaching duo Stefan Kulovits and Gerhard Kleppinger. After not featuring in the first two matchdays of the 2021–22 season, Peña Zauner reached an agreement with the club to terminate his contract, which was still running until the end of the season.

=== Eintracht Braunschweig ===
He moved to 3. Liga club Eintracht Braunschweig on 5 August 2021, having agreed a two-year contract. He made his debut for the club on 8 August in the first round of the DFB-Pokal, replacing Sebastian Müller at half-time of a 2–1 home defeat to Hamburger SV. His league debut followed on 16 August, starting in a 2–0 away win over Hallescher FC. In the following game, on 21 August, he scored his first goal for Braunschweig, helping the side to a 2–0 home victory against FSV Zwickau. He reached promotion to the 2. Bundesliga with the club at the end of the season, scoring four goals in 25 appearances in their league campaign.

However, Peña Zauner barely played during Braunschweig's first season back in the 2. Bundesliga, and only made five appearances during the campaign – all as a substitute.

On 1 June 2023, after two seasons at the club, it was announced that his contract would not be extended, ending his spell with Braunschweig.

=== Roda JC ===
On 27 July 2023, Peña Zauner signed a one-year contract with Dutch Eerste Divisie club Roda JC, with an option for an additional season, after completing a successful trial with the club. He made his debut for De Koempels on 11 August 2023, scoring a goal in a 4–1 home victory over Helmond Sport on the opening day of the season. In the following league game, on 18 August, he scored a brace to lead Roda past ADO Den Haag in a 3–0 away win.

=== Marítimo ===
On 23 January 2025, Peña Zauner moved to Marítimo in Portugal. He made his debut for the club on 2 February, starting in a 1–1 away draw against Chaves.

== International career ==
Peña Zauner holds both German and Venezuelan citizenship. After representing the Hesse under-15 and under-16 state teams and gaining three caps for the Germany national under-16 team, he decided to declare his eligibility for the Venezuelan national teams. He participated in the 2019 South American U-20 Championship in Chile with the Venezuela U20s, qualifying for the final stage, where they eventually finished bottom of the group.

== Style of play ==
Peña Zauner has been described as a "talented attacking midfielder", who is ambidextrous and can be deployed both in the attacking midfield and on the wings.

== Career statistics ==
As of match played 2 February 2025

Appearances and goals by club, season and competition
Club	Season	League			National cup (Note: Includes DFB-Pokal, KNVB Cup)		Other		Total	
Club	Season	Division	Apps	Goals	Apps	Goals	Apps	Goals	Apps	Goals
SV Sandhausen	2019–20	2. Bundesliga	5	1	0	0	—		5	1
SV Sandhausen	2020–21	2. Bundesliga	11	0	0	0	—		11	0
SV Sandhausen	Total		16	1	0	0	—		16	1
SV Sandhausen II	2019–20	Oberliga-BW	3	0	—		—		3	0
Eintracht Braunschweig	2021–22	3. Liga	25	4	1	0	0	0	26	4
Eintracht Braunschweig	2022–23	2. Bundesliga	5	0	0	0	—		5	0
Eintracht Braunschweig	Total		30	4	1	0	0	0	31	4
Roda JC	2023–24	Eerste Divisie	36	12	1	0	1 (Note: Appearances in Eredivisie promotion/relegation playoffs)	0	38	12
Roda JC	2024–25	Eerste Divisie	22	1	1	0	—		23	1
Roda JC	Total		58	13	2	0	1	0	61	13
Marítimo	2024–25	Liga Portugal 2	1	0	0	0	—		1	0
Career total			110	18	3	0	1	0	114	18
