= Walid Ould-Chikh =

Dutch footballer (born 1999)

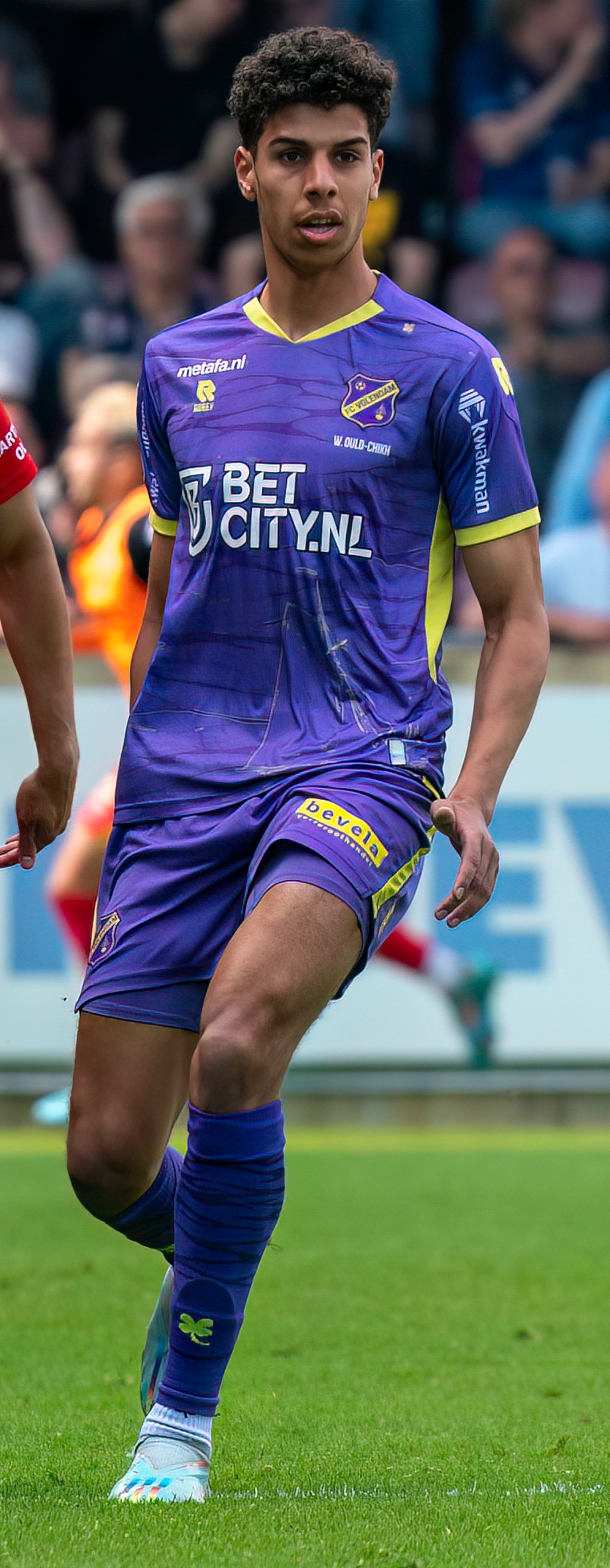
- Ould-Chikh in 2023

Personal information
- Date of birth: 6 November 1999 (age 27)
- Place of birth: Roosendaal, Netherlands
- Height: 1.86 m (6 ft 1 in)
- Position: Attacking midfielder

Team information
- Current team: Al-Arabi (on loan from Heracles Almelo)
- Number: 73

Youth career
- RSC Alliance
- Feyenoord
- RBC Roosendaal
- –2014: Twente
- 2015–2016: PEC Zwolle
- 2017–2018: DHSC

Senior career*
Years	Team	Apps	(Gls)
2018–2019	USV Hercules	18	(12)
2019–2020	De Graafschap	0	(0)
2020–2021	Jong Volendam	10	(1)
2021–2024	Volendam	53	(3)
2023–2024	→ Roda JC (loan)	37	(12)
2024–2026	Eintracht Braunschweig	7	(0)
2025–2026	→ Heracles Almelo (loan)	24	(1)
2026–	Heracles Almelo	0	(0)
2026–	→ Al-Arabi (loan)	0	(0)
- * Club domestic league appearances and goals as of 15 September 2026

Walid Ould-Chikh (born 6 November 1999) is a Dutch professional footballer who plays as an attacking midfielder for Kuwait Premier League club Al-Arabi, on loan from Heracles Almelo.

== Career ==
=== Early years ===
Ould-Chikh played youth football for RSC Alliance, Feyenoord, RBC, Twente, PEC Zwolle, and DHSC. During the 2018–19 season, he played for USV Hercules in the fourth-tier Derde Divisie, after which he spent a year playing for De Graafschap's under-21s. In 2020, he moved to Volendam, signing a contract until 2022.

=== Loan to Roda JC ===
On 7 July 2023, Ould-Chikh was sent on a season-long loan to Eerste Divisie club Roda JC. He made his debut for De Koempels on 11 August 2023, scoring a goal in a 4–1 home victory over Helmond Sport on the opening day of the 2023–24 season. The goal was the first goal of the season. In the following league game, on 18 August, he scored again, helping lead Roda past ADO Den Haag in a 3–0 away win. He had an impressive start to his loan, netting four goals and providing two assists in his initial six appearances. He ended the season with 12 goals and eight assists in 40 appearances, and was named Player of the Season in the Eerste Divisie on 15 May 2024.

=== Eintracht Braunschweig ===
Ould-Chikh moved to 2. Bundesliga club Eintracht Braunschweig in July 2024, having agreed a contract until 2027. He struggled with a back injury early on, mostly leaving him sidelined for most of the season.

=== Heracles Almelo ===
On 1 September 2025, Ould-Chikh was loaned by Heracles Almelo, with an option to buy. At the end of the loan, Heracles exercised their option to buy and signed a three-year contract with Ould-Chikh.

==== Al-Arabi (loan) ====
On 15 September 2026, Ould-Chikh joined Kuwaiti club Al-Arabi on a season-long loan from Heracles Almelo, with an option to buy.

== Personal life ==
Born in the Netherlands, Ould-Chikh is of Moroccan descent. His older brother Bilal is also a footballer. Ould-Chikh is Muslim.

== Career statistics ==
As of match played 1 September 2024

Appearances and goals by club, season and competition
Club	Season	League			National cup		Other		Total	
Club	Season	Division	Apps	Goals	Apps	Goals	Apps	Goals	Apps	Goals
USV Hercules	2018–19	Derde Divisie	18	12	1	0	—		19	12
Jong Volendam	2021–22	Tweede Divisie	10	1	—		—		10	1
Volendam	2021–22	Eerste Divisie	26	2	0	0	—		26	2
Volendam	2022–23	Eredivisie	27	1	2	0	—		29	1
Volendam	Total		53	3	2	0	—		55	3
Roda JC (loan)	2023–24	Eerste Divisie	37	12	1	0	2 (Note: Appearances in Eredivisie promotion/relegation playoffs)	0	40	12
Eintracht Braunschweig	2024–25	2. Bundesliga	4	0	1	0	—		5	0
Career total			122	28	5	0	2	0	129	28

== Honours ==
Individual

- Eerste Divisie Player of the Season: 2023–24
