= Loek Hamers =

Dutch football manager (born 2000)

Personal information
- Date of birth: 22 April 2000 (age 26)
- Place of birth: Roermond, Netherlands
- Height: 1.82 m (6 ft 0 in)
- Position: Goalkeeper

Team information
- Current team: SVH ’39

Youth career
- –2010: SHH
- 2010–2020: Roda JC

Senior career*
| Years | Team | Apps | (Gls) |
| 2020–2024 | Roda JC | 6 | (0) |
| 2025 | SHH | | |

Managerial career
- 2024: SHH (caretaker)
- 2025–2026: SC Leeuwen
- 2026-: SVH ’39
- * Club domestic league appearances and goals

Loek Hamers (born 22 April 2000) is a Dutch football manager and former player who is player/coach of Dutch amateur side SVH ’39.

== Playing career ==
Hamers, born in Roermond but raised in Herten, Netherlands, began his youth career with local amateur side SHH before moving to Roda JC in 2010. After progressing through the club's youth academy, he made his first appearance in the squad during the away match against Volendam on 14 December 2018.

Hamers made his professional debut on 30 August 2020, replacing the injured Jan Hoekstra in the 15th minute and keeping a clean sheet in a 4–0 Eerste Divisie victory against Jong Ajax. On 15 December 2021, Hamers made his first start in a KNVB Cup match against Go Ahead Eagles. However, he allowed the first goal within five minutes and Roda were eventually knocked out of the competition after a 2–0 loss.

On 3 June 2022, he signed his first professional contract with Roda JC, a one-year deal with an option for an additional year. On 29 March 2023, the club exercised the option, thereby extending his contract until 2024.

== Managerial career ==
Hamers began his coaching career at his former youth club SHH, initially serving as goalkeepers coach before briefly stepping in as a player to cover for his injured brother. He would also assume interim managerial duties during the 2023–24 Eerste Klasse season.

On 31 January 2025, he was appointed head coach of Vierde Klasse side SC Leeuwen, ahead of the 2025–26 campaign.

In summer 2026, Hamers was named player-coach at SVH '39 from Herkenbosch.

== Career statistics ==
Appearances and goals by club, season and competition
| Club | Season | League | | | KNVB Cup | | Other | | Total | |
| Club | Season | Division | Apps | Goals | Apps | Goals | Apps | Goals | Apps | Goals |
|---|---|---|---|---|---|---|---|---|---|---|
| Roda JC | 2020–21 | Eerste Divisie | 1 | 0 | 0 | 0 | 0 | 0 | 1 | 0 |
| Roda JC | 2021–22 | Eerste Divisie | 0 | 0 | 1 | 0 | 0 | 0 | 1 | 0 |
| Roda JC | 2022–23 | Eerste Divisie | 2 | 0 | 0 | 0 | — | | 2 | 0 |
| Roda JC | 2023–24 | Eerste Divisie | 3 | 0 | 1 | 0 | 0 | 0 | 4 | 0 |
| Career total | | | 6 | 0 | 2 | 0 | 0 | 0 | 8 | 0 |
