= Parkstad Limburg Stadion =

Football stadium

Coordinates: 50°51′25″N 6°00′21″E

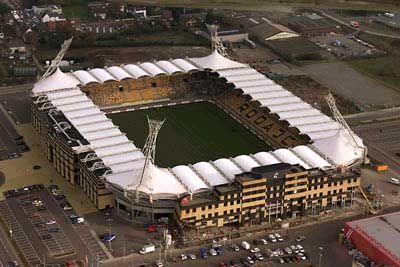
- Interactive map of Parkstad Limburg Stadion
- Location: Kerkrade, Netherlands
- Owner: Municipality Kerkrade
- Operator: Roda JC
- Capacity: 19,979
- Surface: Grass
- Field size: 105 × 68 m

Construction
- Opened: 15 August 2000
- Architect: Jan Dautzenberg

Tenant
- Roda JC

The Parkstad Limburg Stadion (Dutch pronunciation: [ˈpɑr(ə)kstɑt ˈlɪmbʏr(ə)x ˌstaːdijɔn], Ripuarian: [ˈpɑʁəkʃtɑt ˈlembøʁəç ˌʃtaːdijɔn]) is a football stadium in Kerkrade, completed in 2000. With a present-day capacity of 19,979 seats, the stadium was officially opened on 15 August 2000 with a friendly between Roda JC and Real Zaragoza (2–2).

It is the home stadium of the football club Roda JC Kerkrade from the Netherlands. In 2005 the Parkstad Limburg Stadion hosted the opening match and the semi-finals of the FIFA World Youth Championship Netherlands 2005.

== Gallery ==
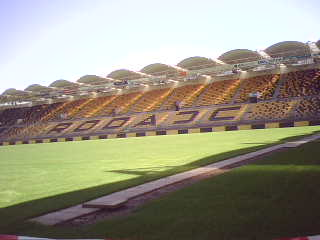
The interior of the stadium in 2008

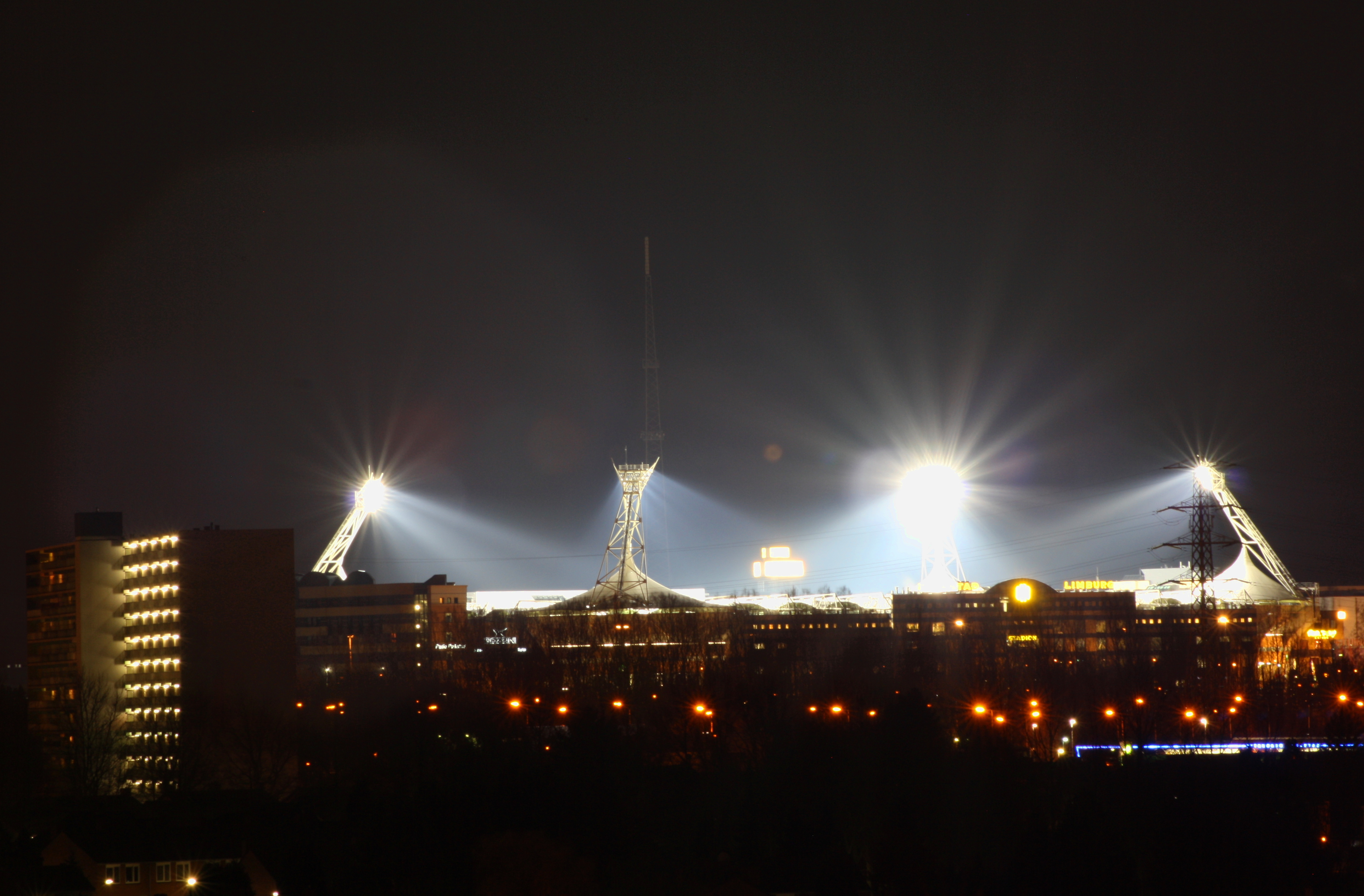
The Parkstad Limburg Stadion in 2010

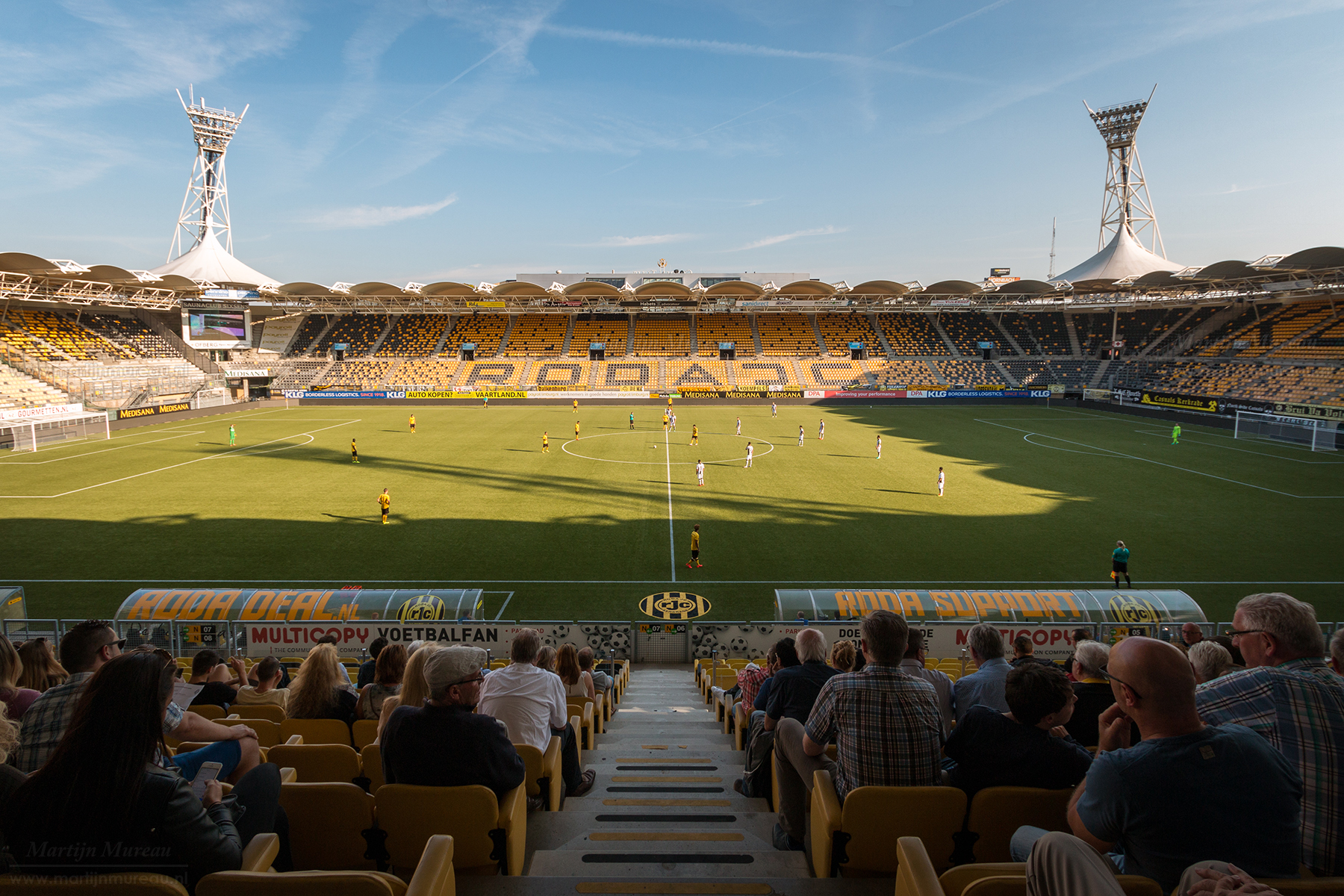
The home of Roda in 2016

== Records ==
Unofficial records:

- The first match played was a friendly match between Roda JC and Real Zaragoza; 2–2, 15 August 2000
- The first goal was scored by Marcos Vales, Real Zaragoza
- The first Roda JC goal was scored by Samir Ouindi

Official records:

- The first official match played was an Eredivisie match between Roda JC and FC Twente; 2–2
- The first official goal was scored by Scott Booth, FC Twente
- The first official Roda JC goal was scored by Yannis Anastasiou

Attendances:

- Largest crowd: 19,300 Roda JC – AC Milan 0–1 UEFA Cup, 21 February 2002
- Lowest crowd: 2,500 Roda JC – Fylkir 3–0 UEFA Cup, 11 September 2001

== Trivia ==
On 15 January 2005, the South stand was named the Theo Pickée Stand as an honour to the Roda JC chairman, who died in December 2003.

== Notable matches ==
- Roda JC – AC Milan 0–1
- Netherlands – Belgium 5–0

== See also ==
- Lists of stadiums
