= Niek Vossebelt =

Dutch footballer (born 1991)

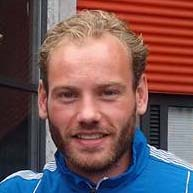
- Vossebelt in 2017

Personal information
- Date of birth: 8 August 1991 (age 35)
- Place of birth: Harderwijk, Netherlands
- Height: 1.85 m (6 ft 1 in)
- Position: Midfielder

Team information
- Current team: Achilles Veen

Youth career
- VV Hierden
- –2006: VVOG
- 2006–2009: FC Zwolle

Senior career*
Years	Team	Apps	(Gls)
2009–2010	FC Zwolle	27	(3)
2010–2014	Willem II	86	(6)
2014–2015	Emmen	25	(4)
2015–2018	Den Bosch	95	(21)
2018–2020	Almere City	42	(9)
2020–2024	Roda JC	105	(6)
2024	Wezel Sport	7	(2)
2025–	Achilles Veen		
- * Club domestic league appearances and goals as of 10:49, 23 March 2025 (UTC)

Niek Vossebelt (born 8 August 1991) is a Dutch footballer who plays as a midfielder for Vierde Divisie club Achilles Veen.

Born in Harderwijk, Gelderland, Vossebelt began his professional career with Zwolle, where he experienced his breakthrough as a box-to-box midfielder in 2009. After one season, he joined Willem II, where he played until 2014, before having a short stint with Emmen. In 2015, he signed with Den Bosch, where he would grow into a key player and the team captain. Two seasons with Almere City followed after leaving Den Bosch in 2018, before he joined Roda JC in 2020.

== Career ==
=== Zwolle ===
Vossebelt was born in Harderwijk, Gelderland, Netherlands, and started playing football for local club VV Hierden, before joining VVOG. He then signed for FC Zwolle in 2006, and came through their youth ranks, making his professional debut on 7 August 2009, the day before his eighteenth birthday, replacing Erik Bakker at the half-time of a 2–0 defeat to AGOVV in the Eerste Divisie. He made his first ever start on 21 August, playing 79 minutes in Zwolle's 2–0 away loss to TOP Oss. On 28 August 2009, Vossebelt scored his first professional goal in a 3–0 away win over Volendam. During his first months as part of Zwolle's first team, he was coached by former Netherlands international Jaap Stam, who served both as an assistant and a caretaker manager throughout that same campaign.

At the end of the 2009–10 season, Vossebelt's contract with Zwolle expired. Despite the club offering him an extension, he refused and instead became a free agent.

=== Willem II ===
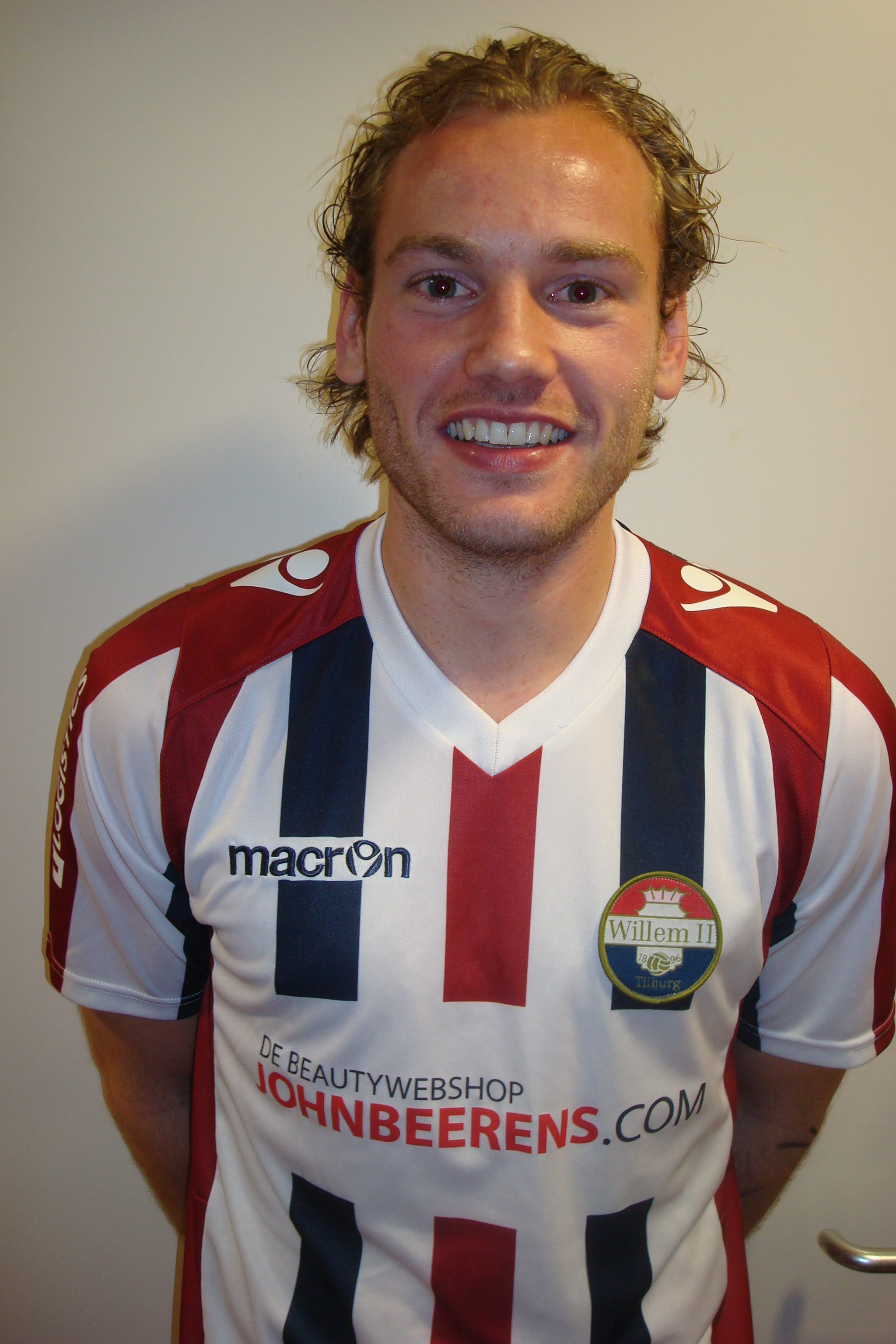
Vossebelt with Willem II in 2007.

In May 2010, he signed a three-year contract with Eredivisie club Willem II. He made his debut for the club on 7 August 2010 in a 3–0 away loss to Heracles Almelo, replacing Marlon Pereira in the 80th minute. Vossebelt was mainly a substitute during his first season in Tilburg, making 19 total appearances, of which nine were as a starter, as Willem II finished at the bottom of the table and suffered relegation to the Eerste Divisie.

The following season, the midfielder played more regularly, scoring two goals in 28 total appearances. The club managed to return to the Eredivisie that same season through play-offs, with Vossebelt starting in the decisive match, a 2–1 win over Den Bosch. In the 2012–13 season, the club suffered relegation once again, but they would go back to the Eredivisie by winning the second-tier title in the 2013–14 season.

Ahead of the 2014–15 Eredivisie season, Vossebelt featured less in head coach Jurgen Streppel's plans, and his contract was terminated by mutual consent on 1 September 2014. He made a total of 92 appearances for the club, scoring five goals.

=== Emmen ===
After becoming a free agent and going on a successful trial with Eerste Divisie club FC Emmen, Vossebelt signed a one-year contract with the club on 14 October 2014. Four days later, he made his debut for Emmen, replacing Boy Deul in the 67th minute of a 6–0 home victory against MVV. On 7 November 2014, he scored his first goal for the club in the 95th minute of a 3–2 league loss to Roda JC.

Vossebelt eventually became a starter for Emmen during the season, as the club finished fourth in the league table. He made 28 total appearances, scoring four goals. His side eventually missed out on promotion, having suffered a 3–2 loss to Roda JC on aggregate.

=== Den Bosch ===
On 14 June 2015, with his contract with Emmen expiring, Vossebelt joined Eerste Divisie club FC Den Bosch on a two-year deal. He made his debut for the club in a 2–2 draw against Fortuna Sittard on 7 August 2015. His first goal for Den Bosch came on 8 April 2016, in a 5–0 win over Telstar: it remained his only goal for that season. On 24 February 2017, he extended his contract with the club until June 2019. Around the same time he was also named as the new club captain. Vossebelt was a key player during his three seasons at Den Bosch: during the 2017–18 campaign, his last one with the club, he became the club's top goalscorer, despite being a midfielder, having scored 15 goals in 38 appearances, including a hat-trick against Jong PSV on 29 September 2017.

=== Almere City ===
On 12 July 2018, Vossebelt signed a three-year contract with Eerste Divisie club Almere City. On 20 August, the opening day of the 2018–19 season, he made his debut for Almere in a 3–2 away win against Jong AZ: he also opened the scoring after 12 minutes, through a header from a corner-kick by Andreias Calcan. He scored six goals in his first seven appearances for the club, as the club took the lead of the league after the first eight rounds. In February 2019, Vossebelt suffered an ankle injury, which sidelined him for several months.

In his second season at the club, Vossebelt was mainly a substitute and made 17 total appearances, seven of which were as a starter. He left Almere at the end of the 2019–20 season, having collected 46 appearances to his name for the club, alongside 10 goals.

=== Roda JC ===
On 30 July 2020, Vossebelt signed a two-year contract with Eerste Divisie club Roda JC. He immediately scored in his debut for the club in the 94th minute of a 4–0 league win over Jong Ajax. On 23 June 2022, he extended his contract with Roda until June 2024.

=== Wezel Sport ===
On 30 May 2024, Belgian Division 2 side Wezel Sport announced the signing of Vossebelt for the 2024–25 season. He joined alongside compatriot Moreno Rutten, with the move also signalling both players' retirement from professional football.

=== Achilles Veen ===
On 24 December 2024, it was announced that Vossebelt would join Dutch Vierde Divisie club Achilles Veen from January 2025 on a one-and-a-half-year contract, together with Wezel teammate Moreno Rutten.

== Style of play ==
Vossebelt is a box-to-box midfielder. A leader on the pitch, he captained FC Den Bosch at age 24. In 2015, his former head coach René van Eck described Vossebelt as "a true team-player" who "can play in multiple positions in midfield". He developed as a goalscorer during his three-year stint with Den Bosch, often moving into the opponent's box from his position in midfield.

== Personal life ==
Vossebelt's younger sibling, Thomas, is a former professional footballer who played for Zwolle. In his youth, Vossebelt worked both as a paperboy and a dishwasher in a restaurant.

== Career statistics ==
As of 23 March 2025

Appearances and goals by club, season and competition
Club	Season	League			National cup		Other		Total	
Club	Season	Division	Apps	Goals	Apps	Goals	Apps	Goals	Apps	Goals
Zwolle	2009–10	Eredivisie	27	3	2	0	2 (Note: Appearances in Eredivisie promotion/relegation playoffs)	0	31	3
Willem II	2010–11	Eredivisie	18	0	1	0	—		19	0
Willem II	2011–12	Eerste Divisie	24	2	1	0	3	0	28	2
Willem II	2012–13	Eredivisie	22	3	0	0	—		22	3
Willem II	2013–14	Eerste Divisie	22	1	1	0	—		23	1
Willem II	Total		86	6	3	0	3	0	92	6
Emmen	2014–15	Eredivisie	25	4	1	0	2	0	28	4
Den Bosch	2015–16	Eerste Divisie	29	1	3	0	—		32	1
Den Bosch	2016–17	Eerste Divisie	29	5	1	0	—		30	5
Den Bosch	2017–18	Eerste Divisie	37	15	1	0	—		38	15
Den Bosch	Total		95	21	5	0	—		100	21
Almere City	2018–19	Eerste Divisie	26	7	2	0	1	1	29	8
Almere City	2019–20 (Note: Season curtailed due to COVID-19 pandemic in the Netherlands)	Eerste Divisie	16	2	1	0	—		17	2
Almere City	Total		42	9	3	0	1	1	46	10
Roda JC	2020–21	Eerste Divisie	31	2	1	0	2	0	34	2
Roda JC	2021–22	Eerste Divisie	30	2	2	0	2	0	34	2
Roda JC	2022–23	Eerste Divisie	34	2	1	0	—		35	2
Roda JC	2023–24	Eerste Divisie	10	0	0	0	1	0	11	0
Roda JC	Total		105	6	4	0	5	0	114	6
Wezel Sport	2024–25	Belgian Division 2	7	2	0	0	—		7	2
Achilles Veen	2024–25	Vierde Divisie	?	?	?	?	—		?	?
Career total			387	51	18	0	13	1	418	52

== Honours ==
Willem II

- Eerste Divisie: 2013–14
