= 2018–19 RKC Waalwijk season =

RKC Waalwijk
2018–19 season
- Manager: Fred Grim
- Stadium: Mandemakers Stadion
- Eerste Divisie: 8th
- Promotion-playoffs: Winners
- KNVB Cup: Round of 16
- Top goalscorer: League: Emil Hansson (12); All: Emil Hansson (13)

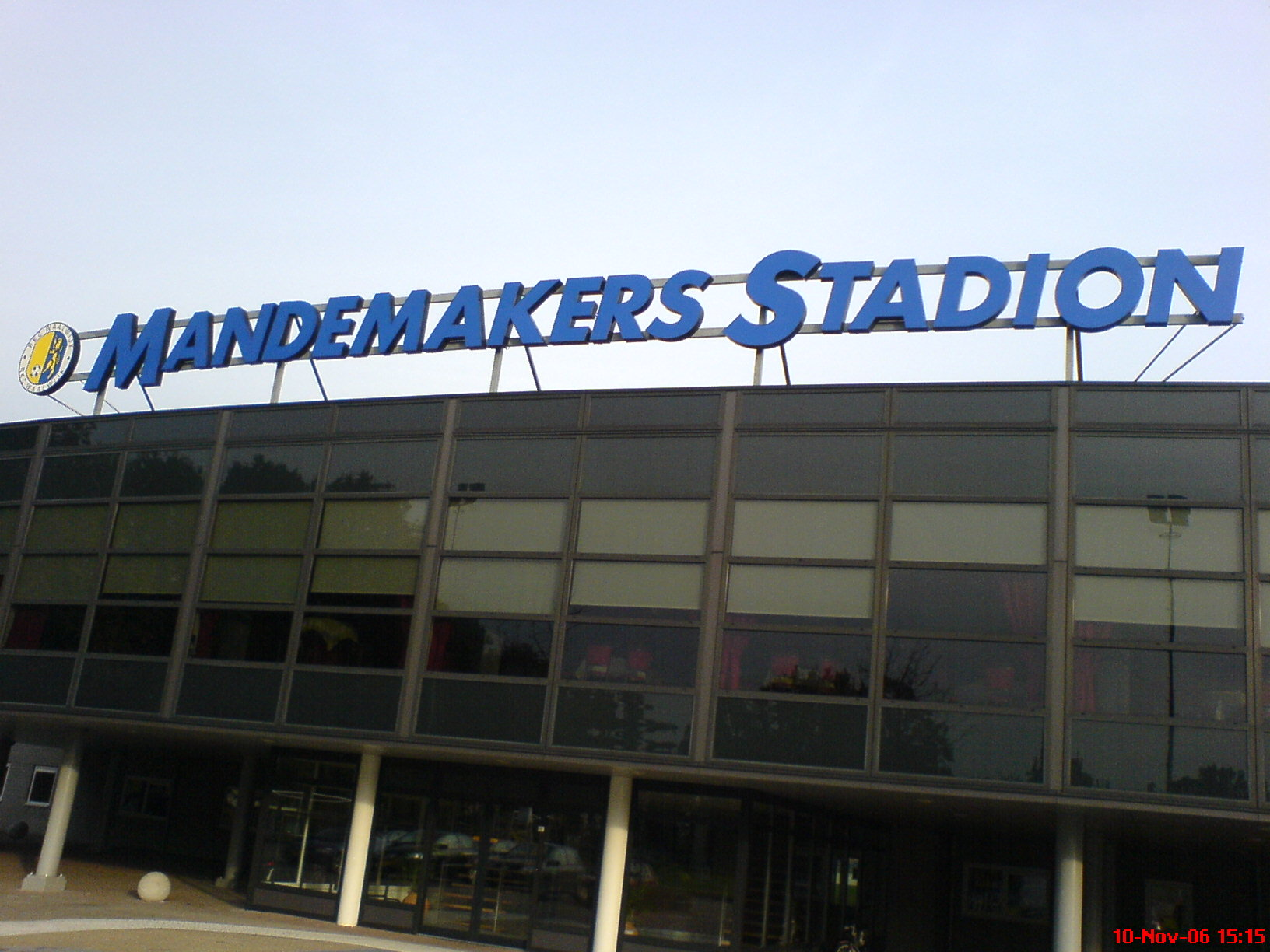
RKC Waalwijk Maandemakers Stadion

The 2018–19 season was the 79th season in the existence of RKC Waalwijk and the club's fifth consecutive season in the second division of Dutch football. In addition to the domestic league, RKC Waalwijk participated in this season's editions of the KNVB Cup.

== Pre-season and friendlies ==
Win Draw Loss

10 July 2018 Friendly	Zulte Waregem (Belgium)	3–1	(Netherlands) RKC Waalwijk	Deinze, Belgium
17:00	Bongonda 39'; Bjørdal 76'; Soisalo 80'		Bakari 87'	Stadium: Complex Gaversesteenweg

18 July 2018 Friendly	Maccabi Haifa (Israel)	0–0	(Netherlands) RKC Waalwijk
18:00

27 July 2018 Friendly	NEC (Netherlands)	2–1	(Netherlands) RKC Waalwijk	Weurt
19:00	Achahbar 15'; Joppen 45'		Van der Moot 19'	Stadium: Sportpark De Kamp

4 August 2018 Friendly	PEC Zwolle (Netherlands)	3–0	(Netherlands) RKC Waalwijk	Zwolle
16:00	Van Crooij 27'; Genreau 32'; Leemans 90+2' (pen.)		MAC³PARK Stadion

10 August 2018 Friendly	Kozakken Boys (Netherlands)	1–2	(Netherlands) RKC Waalwijk
20:00

5 January 2019 Friendly	RKC Waalwijk (Netherlands)	3–0	(Netherlands) Katwijk	Waalwijk
15:00	Seys 3'; Sow 70'; Walian 89'			Stadium: Mandemakers Stadion

== Competitions ==
=== Overall record ===
Competition	First match	Last match	Starting round	Final position	Record							
Competition	First match	Last match	Starting round	Final position	Pld	W	D	L	GF	GA	GD	Win %
Eerste Divisie	17 August 2018	3 May 2019	Matchday 1	8th	38	18	5	15	69	57	+12	47.37
Promotion play-offs	10 May 2019	28 May 2019	First round	Winners	6	3	2	1	11	8	+3	50.00
KNVB Cup	25 September 2018	18 December 2018	First round	Round of 16	3	2	0	1	5	4	+1	66.67
Total					47	23	7	17	85	69	+16	48.94

Source: Competitions

=== Eerste Divisie ===
==== League table ====
Pos	Team	Pld	W	D	L	GF	GA	GD	Pts	Promotion or qualification
6	TOP Oss	38	18	8	12	48	40	+8	62	Qualification to promotion play-offs second round
7	Almere City (Note: Winner of the Fourth Period (games 30–38).)	38	19	5	14	60	63	−3	62	Qualification to promotion play-offs first round
8	RKC Waalwijk (O, P)	38	18	5	15	69	57	+12	59	Qualification to promotion play-offs first round
9	NEC	38	16	10	12	73	60	+13	58	Qualification to promotion play-offs first round
10	Cambuur	38	16	10	12	61	48	+13	58	Qualification to promotion play-offs first round

Source: Soccerway, Keuken Kampioen Divisie (in Dutch)
Rules for classification: Season in progress: 1) Most points won; 2) Less points lost; 3) Goal difference; 4) Goals scored; 5) Alphabetical order. End of season: 1) Points; 2) Goal difference; 3) Goals scored; 4) Head-to-head points; 5) Head-to-head goal difference; 6) Head-to-head away goals scored; 7) Play-off if relevant for deciding champion, relegation, international competitions and play-offs qualification, otherwise by draw. 8) Penalty shoot-out (only after a play-off)
(O) Play-off winners; (P) Promoted

==== Results summary ====
Overall								Home						Away					
Pld	W	D	L	GF	GA	GD	Pts	W	D	L	GF	GA	GD	W	D	L	GF	GA	GD
38	18	5	15	69	57	+12	59	9	4	6	36	30	+6	9	1	9	33	27	+6

Source: Soccerway

==== Results by round ====
Round	1	2	3	4	5	6	7	8	9	10	11	12	13	14	15	16	17	18	19	20	21	22	23	24	25	26	27	28	29	30	31	32	33	34	35	36	37	38
Ground	H	A	H	A	H	H	A	A	H	A	H	A	H	A	H	A	H	A	H	A	H	A	H	A	H	H	A	H	A	H	A	H	A	A	H	A	A	H
Result	W	W	L	L	L	D	L	L	D	L	W	L	L	W	W	L	W	W	L	W	W	W	W	W	L	D	L	L	W	W	L	W	D	W	D	L	W	W
Position	8	3	8	12	13	12	14	14	15	16	14	15	15	15	15	16	15	13	14	12	10	10	8	7	8	10	11	12	11	6	9	7	8	8	7	10	10	8

A = Away; H = Home; W = Win; D = Draw; L = Loss

==== Matches ====
17 August 2018 1	RKC Waalwijk	1–0	Telstar	Waalwijk
	Hansson 25'; Maatsen (yellow card) 59'; Bilate (yellow card) 90'	Report	Cabral (yellow card) 31'; Najah (yellow card) 35'; Korpershoek (yellow card) 53'; van Iperen (yellow card) 88'; Sno (yellow card) 90'	Stadium: Mandemakers Stadion

24 August 2018 2	Den Bosch	2–3	RKC Waalwijk	's-Hertogenbosch
	Beltrame 24'; Sappinen 49'; Blummel (yellow card) 70'; Verbeek (yellow card) 89'; Rodrigues (yellow card) 90'	Report	Lammers 28'; Hansson (yellow card) 57'; Bilate 60', 83'; Gaari (yellow card) 61'; Mulder (yellow card) 69'	Stadium: De Vliert

31 August 2018 3	RKC Waalwijk	0–1	Sparta Rotterdam	Waalwijk
	Bilate (yellow card) 54'	Report	Rayhi 17'; Spierings (yellow card) 76'	Stadium: Mandemakers Stadion

7 September 2018 4	SC Cambuur	2–0	RKC Waalwijk	Leeuwarden
	Rossi 8'; Mathieu 57'	Report	Lammers (yellow card) 48'; Hansson (yellow card) 77'	Stadium: Cambuur Stadion

14 September 2018 5	RKC Waalwijk	0–1	Roda JC Kerkrade	Waalwijk
	Mulder (yellow card) 79'	Report	Dijkhuizen 61'; Paulissen (yellow card) 79'	Stadium: Mandemakers Stadion

21 September 2018 6	RKC Waalwijk	2–2	Jong AZ	Waalwijk
	Bilate 1'; Seys (yellow card) 41'; Lammers (yellow card) 75'; Baggerman 90'; Quasten (yellow card) 90'	Report	Reijnders 7'; Weigelt (yellow card) 33'; Hoedemakers (yellow card) 52'; Druijf 57'; Jacobs (yellow card) 90'	Stadium: Mandemakers Stadion

28 September 2018 7	Almere City	2–1	RKC Waalwijk	Almere
	Receveur (yellow card) 19'; Vossebelt 42', 79', (yellow card) 80'; Calcan (yellow card) 72'; Soleri (yellow card) 80'	Report	Drost (yellow card) 45'; Baggerman (yellow card) 71'; Koenraat 75'; Vaessen (yellow card) 78'; Hansson (yellow card) 88'

5 October 2018 8	FC Volendam	1–0	RKC Waalwijk	Volendam
	Peters 6'; Berenstein (yellow card) 66'; Doodeman (yellow card) 87'	Report	van Weert (yellow card) 41' (yellow-red card); Vaessen (yellow card) 87'	Stadium: Kras Stadion

12 October 2018 9	RKC Waalwijk	0–0	TOP Oss	Waalwijk
	Baggerman (yellow card) 39' (yellow-red card); Meulensteen (yellow card) 44'	Report	Asmelash (yellow card) 86'; Piqué (yellow card) 90'	Stadium: Mandemakers Stadion

19 October 2018 10	Jong Ajax	2–1	RKC Waalwijk	Amsterdam
	Danilo 34', 85'; Bakboord (red card) 49'; Bakker (yellow card) 79'; Bijleveld (yellow card) 90'	Report	Tahiri (yellow card) 39', (goal) 43'; Gaari (yellow card) 73'	Stadium: Sportpark De Toekomst

26 October 2018 11	RKC Waalwijk	3–2	Jong Utrecht	Waalwijk
	Mulder 27'; Seys 42'; Vermeulen 47'; Drost (yellow card) 82'	Report	Lim 16'; van der Velden (yellow card) 55' (yellow-red card)	Stadium: Mandemakers Stadion

2 November 2018 12	FC Twente	3–1	RKC Waalwijk	Enschede
	Bijen 17'; Cantalapiedra 38'; Maria 81'	Report	Quasten (yellow card) 19'; Vaessen (yellow card) 39'; Gaari (yellow card) 43'; Seys (yellow card) 74', (goal) 90'	Stadium: De Grolsch Veste

9 November 2018 13	RKC Waalwijk	3–5	Jong PSV	Waalwijk
	Seys 14', (yellow card) 86'; Hansson 52', 83'; Walian (yellow card) 69'; Gaari (yellow card) 71'; Mulder (yellow card) 75'	Report	Gakpo 5', 39', (yellow card) 57'; Verreth 17'; Piroe 31' (pen.), 53'	Stadium: Mandemakers Stadion

17 November 2018 14	Helmond Sport	0–2	RKC Waalwijk	Helmond
	Snepvangers (yellow card) 22'; Swinnen (yellow card) 45'; Meijers (yellow card) 90'	Report	Walian 32', (red card) 47'; Maatsen 39'; Mulder (yellow card) 72'	Stadium: Stadion De Braak

23 November 2018 15	RKC Waalwijk	1–0	NEC	Waalwijk
	Bergkamp 36'; Vermeulen (yellow card) 74'; Maatsen (yellow card) 82'	Report	Jansen (yellow card) 52'; van Eijden (yellow card) 77'	Stadium: Mandemakers Stadion

30 November 2018 16	FC Dordrecht	2–0	RKC Waalwijk	Dordrecht
	Kok (yellow card) 12'; Zamouri 31', 49'; Peijnenburg (yellow card) 58'	Report	Maatsen (yellow card) 58'; Hansson (yellow card) 90'	Stadium: Stadion Krommedijk

7 December 2018 17	RKC Waalwijk	3–1	MVV Maastricht	Waalwijk
	Seys 37'; Meulensteen (yellow card) 50'; Vermeulen 75'; Hansson 87'	Report	Schroyen (yellow card) 25'; Ippel (yellow card) 50'; Lavalée (yellow card) 73'; van den Hurk 78'	Stadium: Mandemakers Stadion

14 December 2018 18	FC Eindhoven	1–3	RKC Waalwijk	Eindhoven
	van den Boomen 41' (pen.)	Report	Vaessen (yellow card) 40'; Maatsen 45', 64'; Hansson 82'	Stadium: Jan Louwers Stadion

21 December 2018 19	RKC Waalwijk	1–3	Go Ahead Eagles	Waalwijk
	Koenraat (yellow card) 8'; Seys (yellow card) 52'; Hansson 89'	Report	Navrátil 44'; van der Venne 55'; Veldmate 57'	Stadium: Mandemakers Stadion

13 January 2019 20	TOP Oss	1–2	RKC Waalwijk	Oss
	Kaak (yellow card) 40'; Doğan 57' (pen.); Nieveld (yellow card) 75'	Report	Vaessen (yellow card) 56'; Hansson 64' (pen.); Seys 86'; Spierings (yellow card) 90'	Stadium: Frans Heesen Stadion

18 January 2019 21	RKC Waalwijk	4–1	Jong Ajax	Waalwijk
				Stadium: Mandemakers Stadion

28 January 2019 22	Jong Utrecht	1–2	RKC Waalwijk	Utrecht

1 February 2019 23	RKC Waalwijk	2–1	Den Bosch	Waalwijk
				Stadium: Mandemakers Stadion

8 February 2019 24	Telstar	0–3	RKC Waalwijk	Velsen-Zuid
20:00				Stadium: Rabobank IJmond Stadion; Referee: Erwin Blank

15 February 2019 25	RKC Waalwijk	0–1	Almere City	Waalwijk
				Stadium: Mandemakers Stadion

22 February 2019 26	RKC Waalwijk	3–3	Volendam	Waalwijk
20:00	Meulensteen (red card) 58'			Stadium: Mandemakers Stadion; Referee: Stan Teuben

1 March 2019 27	Sparta Rotterdam	2–1	RKC Waalwijk	Rotterdam
20:00	Duarte 78'; Dervişoğlu 88'		Sow 32'	Stadium: Sparta Stadion Het Kasteel; Referee: Richard Martens

8 March 2019 28	RKC Waalwijk	0–2	SC Cambuur	Waalwijk
20:00				Stadium: Mandemakers Stadion; Referee: Marc Nagtegaal

15 March 2019 29	MVV Maastricht	1–4	RKC Waalwijk	Maastricht
20:00				Stadium: De Geusselt; Referee: Christian Mulder

22 March 2019 30	RKC Waalwijk	2–1	Helmond Sport	Waalwijk
20:00	Spierings 55'; Bilate 90'		Respen 45+1'	Stadium: Mandemakers Stadion; Referee: Alex Bos

29 March 2019 31	Jong PSV	2–1	RKC Waalwijk	Eindhoven
20:00	Zakaria Aboukhlal 47'; Soulas 60'		Maatsen 74'; Seys (penalty missed) 88'	Stadium: PSV Campus De Herdgang; Referee: Jannick van der Laan

1 April 2019 32	RKC Waalwijk	4–1	FC Twente	Waalwijk
20:00	Bilate 14'; Seys 43'; Ricardinho 86' (o.g.); Maatsen 90'		Cantalapiedra 64'	Stadium: Mandemakers Stadion; Referee: Christiaan Bax

5 April 2019 33	Roda JC Kerkrade	0–0	RKC Waalwijk	Kerkrade
20:00				Stadium: Parkstad Limburg Stadion; Referee: Clay Ruperti

12 April 2019 34	Jong AZ	2–4	RKC Waalwijk	Wijdewormer
20:00				Stadium: AFAS Trainingscomplex; Referee: Laurens Gerrets

19 April 2019 35	RKC Waalwijk	4–4	FC Dordrecht	Waalwijk
20:00				Stadium: Mandemakers Stadion; Referee: Martin van den Kerkhof

22 April 2019 36	NEC	2–1	RKC Waalwijk	Nijmegen
14:30				Stadium: Goffertstadion; Referee: Sander van der Eijk

26 April 2019 37	Go Ahead Eagles	1–4	RKC Waalwijk	Deventer
20:00				Stadium: De Adelaarshorst; Referee: Christian Mulder

3 May 2019 38	RKC Waalwijk	3–1	FC Eindhoven	Waalwijk
20:00	Quasten 1'; Hansson 33', 44'		Cicilia 30'	Stadium: Mandemakers Stadion; Referee: Edgar Bijl

==== Promotion play-offs ====
10 May 2019 First round First leg	NEC	2–0	RKC Waalwijk	Nijmegen
18:30	Trésor 12'; Bruijn 15'	Report		Stadium: Goffertstadion; Referee: Christiaan Bax

14 May 2019 First round Second leg	RKC Waalwijk	3–0 (3–2 agg.)	NEC	Waalwijk
18:30	Seys 41'; Spierings 62'; Bilate 70'	Report		Stadium: Mandemakers Stadion; Referee: Joey Kooij

19 May 2019 Second round First leg	RKC Waalwijk	2–1	Excelsior	Waalwijk
14:30	Bilate 53'; Gaari 81'	Report	Fortes 71'	Stadium: Mandemakers Stadion; Referee: Richard Martens

22 May 2019 Second round Second leg	Excelsior	1–1 (3–2 agg.)	RKC Waalwijk	Rotterdam
18:30	Ómarsson 49'	Report	Spierings (yellow card) 35' (yellow-red card) , (goal) 38'	Stadium: Stadion Woudestein; Referee: Edwin van de Graaf

25 May 2019 Second round First leg	RKC Waalwijk	0–0	Go Ahead Eagles	Waalwijk
18:30		Report		Stadium: Mandemakers Stadion

28 May 2019 Second round Second leg	Go Ahead Eagles	4–5 (4–5 agg.)	RKC Waalwijk	Deventer
18:30	Veldmate 45' (pen.); Van der Venne 55'; Bakx 63'; Langedijk 89'	Report	Hansson 13' (pen.); Spierings 38', 90+5'; Mulder 79'; Bilate 90+8' (pen.)	Stadium: De Adelaarshorst; Referee: Dennis Higler

=== KNVB Cup ===
25 September 2018 First round	RKC Waalwijk	2–0	NAC Breda	Waalwijk
18:30	Baggerman 42'; Seys 47'	Report		Stadium: Mandemakers Stadion; Referee: Kevin Blom

30 October 2018 First round	PSV	2–3 (a.e.t.)	RKC Waalwijk	Eindhoven
18:30	Gutiérrez 1'; Júnior 76'	Report	Van Weert 29'; Maatsen 90+1', 109'	Stadium: Mandemakers Stadion; Referee: Martin van den Kerkhof

18 December 2018 Second round	FC Twente	2–0	RKC Waalwijk	Enschede
19:45	Schenk 26'; Oosterwijk 90+1'	Report		Stadium: De Grolsch Veste; Referee: Richard Martens
