= 2019–20 RKC Waalwijk season =

RKC Waalwijk
2019–20 season
- Chairman: Peter Konijnenburg
- Head coach: Fred Grim
- Stadium: Mandemakers Stadion
- Eredivisie: 18th
- KNVB Cup: First round
Home colours	Away colours	Third colours

The 2019–20 season was RKC Waalwijk's 80th season in existence and the club's first season in the top flight of Dutch football. In addition to the domestic league, RKC Waalwijk participated in this season's edition of the KNVB Cup. The season covered the period from 1 July 2019 to 30 June 2020.

== Players ==
=== Current squad ===
As of 1 February 2020

Note: Flags indicate national team as defined under FIFA eligibility rules; some limited exceptions apply. Players may hold more than one non-FIFA nationality.

No.	Pos.	Nation	Player
1	GK	NED	Etienne Vaessen
2	DF	CUW	Juriën Gaari
3	DF	NED	Melle Meulensteen
4	DF	BEL	Hannes Delcroix (on loan from Anderlecht)
5	DF	CZE	Paul Quasten
6	MF	NED	Daan Rienstra (captain)
7	MF	NED	Tijjani Reijnders (on loan from AZ)
8	MF	MAR	Anas Tahiri
9	FW	NED	Mario Bilate
10	MF	NED	Richard van der Venne
11	FW	NED	Darren Maatsen
12	MF	NED	Hans Mulder
13	GK	NED	Kees Heemskerk
14	DF	NED	Henrico Drost

No.	Pos.	Nation	Player
15	DF	NED	Lars Nieuwpoort
16	DF	NED	Ingo van Weert
17	FW	NED	Stanley Elbers (on loan from PEC Zwolle)
18	MF	BEL	Nando Nöstlinger
19	FW	NED	Sylla Sow
21	MF	BEL	Lennerd Daneels
22	GK	NED	Mike Grim
23	MF	NED	Clint Leemans (on loan from PEC Zwolle)
24	FW	NED	Dylan Vente (on loan from Feyenoord)
25	DF	BUL	Stefan Velkov (on loan from Den Bosch)
26	MF	NED	Nikki Baggerman
27	FW	SWE	Emil Hansson (on loan from Hannover 96)
28	FW	COM	Saïd Bakari
29	DF	NED	Fabian Sporkslede

== Pre-season and friendlies ==
Win Draw Loss

9 July 2019 Friendly	SDC Putten (Netherlands)	0–8	(Netherlands) RKC Waalwijk	Putten, Netherlands
16:30 CEST (UTC+2)				Stadium: Sportpark Puttereng

12 July 2019 Friendly	RKC Waalwijk (Netherlands)	3–1	(Belgium) KV Mechelen	Garderen, Netherlands
17:30 CEST (UTC+2)				Stadium: Sportpark De Westeneng

16 July 2019 Friendly	TOP Oss (Netherlands)	0–1	(Netherlands) RKC Waalwijk	Herpen, Netherlands
18:00 CEST (UTC+2)				Stadium: Sportpark De Wilgendaal

23 July 2019 Friendly	NAC Breda (Netherlands)	0–2	(Netherlands) RKC Waalwijk	Sint Willebrord, Netherlands
16:00 CEST (UTC+2)				Stadium: Sportpark De Gagelrijzen

26 July 2019 Friendly	NEC Nijmegen (Netherlands)	2–1	(Netherlands) RKC Waalwijk	Weurt, Netherlands
18:00 CEST (UTC+2)				Stadium: Sportpark De Kamp

8 January 2020 Friendly	Servette (Switzerland)	1–0	(Netherlands) RKC Waalwijk	Vilamoura, Portugal
16:30 CET (UTC+1)				Stadium: Browns Sport & Leisure Club

== Competitions ==
Win Draw Loss

=== Overview ===
Competition	First match	Last match	Starting round	Final position	Record							
Competition	First match	Last match	Starting round	Final position	Pld	W	D	L	GF	GA	GD	Win %
Eredivisie	3 August 2019	8 March 2020	Matchday 1	18th	26	4	3	19	27	60	−33	15.38
KNVB Cup	30 October 2019		First round	First round	1	0	0	1	3	4	−1	0.00
Total					27	4	3	20	30	64	−34	14.81

Last updated: 8 March 2020
Source: Soccerway

=== Eredivisie ===
==== League table ====
Pos	Team	Pld	W	D	L	GF	GA	GD	Pts
14	FC Twente	26	7	6	13	34	46	−12	27
15	PEC Zwolle	26	7	5	14	37	55	−18	26
16	Fortuna Sittard	26	6	8	12	29	52	−23	26
17	ADO Den Haag	26	4	7	15	25	54	−29	19
18	RKC Waalwijk	26	4	3	19	27	60	−33	15

Source: eredivisie.nl
Rules for classification: Season in progress: 1) Most points won; 2) Less points lost; 3) Goal difference; 4) Goals scored; 5) Alphabetical order; End of season: 1) Points; 2) Goal difference; 3) Goals scored; 4) Head-to-head points; 5) Head-to-head goal difference; 6) Head-to-head away goals scored; 7) Play-off if relevant for deciding champion, relegation or participating in a European league, otherwise by draw. 8) Penalty shoot-out (only after a play-off)

==== Results summary ====
Overall								Home						Away					
Pld	W	D	L	GF	GA	GD	Pts	W	D	L	GF	GA	GD	W	D	L	GF	GA	GD
26	4	3	19	27	60	−33	15	3	2	8	13	20	−7	1	1	11	14	40	−26

Last updated: 8 March 2020.
Source: Eredivisie

==== Results by round ====
Round	1	2	3	4	5	6	7	8	9	10	11	12	13	14	15	16	17	18	19	20	21	22	23	24	25	26	27	28	29	30	31	32	33	34
Ground	A	H	A	H	H	A	A	H	A	H	A	H	A	H	A	H	A	H	A	H	A	H	A	H	H	A	H	A	H	A	H	A	H	A
Result	L	L	D	L	L	L	L	L	L	L	L	W	L	D	W	L	L	W	L	L	L	D	L	L	W	L	C	C	C	C	C	C	C	C
Position	16	17	14	17	18	18	18	18	18	18	18	18	18	18	18	18	18	18	18	18	18	18	18	18	18	18	18	18	18	18	18	18	18	18

Updated to match(es) played on 8 March 2020. Source: Eredivisie
A = Away; H = Home; W = Win; D = Draw; L = Loss

==== Matches ====
The Eredivisie schedule was announced on 14 June 2019. The 2019–20 season was abandoned on 24 April 2020, due to the coronavirus pandemic in the Netherlands.

3 August 2019 1	VVV-Venlo	3–1	RKC Waalwijk	Venlo
20:45 CEST (UTC+2)				Stadium: De Koel

11 August 2019 2	RKC Waalwijk	0–2	AZ	Waalwijk
14:30 CEST (UTC+2)		Report	Idrissi 35', 48'	Stadium: Mandemakers Stadion; Attendance: 6,023; Referee: Allard Lindhout

18 August 2019 3	Twente	3–3	RKC Waalwijk	Enschede
14:30 CEST (UTC+2)		Report		Stadium: De Grolsch Veste; Attendance: 25,700; Referee: Martin Pérez

25 August 2019 4	RKC Waalwijk	0–3	ADO Den Haag	Waalwijk
12:15 CEST (UTC+2)		Report		Stadium: Mandemakers Stadion; Attendance: 5,034; Referee: Edwin van de Graaf

1 September 2019 5	RKC Waalwijk	1–3	PSV	Waalwijk
20:00 CEST (UTC+2)	Drost (yellow card) 34'; Meulensteen 43'; Bakari (yellow card) 75'	Report	Gakpo (yellow card) 29'; Gutiérrez (yellow card) 51'; Quasten 65' (o.g.); Baumgartl 76'; Mitroglou 78'	Stadium: Mandemakers Stadion; Attendance: 7,508; Referee: Kevin Blom

15 September 2019 6	PEC Zwolle	6–2	RKC Waalwijk	Zwolle
16:45 CEST (UTC+2)				Stadium: MAC³PARK Stadion

21 September 2019 7	Sparta Rotterdam	4–0	RKC Waalwijk	Rotterdam
19:45 CEST (UTC+2)				Stadium: Het Kasteel

29 September 2019 8	RKC Waalwijk	1–2	Vitesse	Waalwijk
20:45 CEST (UTC+2)				Stadium: Mandemakers Stadion

4 October 2019 9	Groningen	3–0	RKC Waalwijk	Groningen
18:45 CEST (UTC+2)				Stadium: Euroborg

19 October 2019 10	RKC Waalwijk	1–2	Ajax	Waalwijk
18:30 CEST (UTC+2)	Bakari 63'; Spierings (yellow card) 79'	Report	Tadić 46'; Promes 76'	Stadium: Mandemakers Stadion; Attendance: 7,508; Referee: Allard Lindhout

26 October 2019 11	Willem II	2–1	RKC Waalwijk	Tilburg
18:30 CEST (UTC+2)		Report		Stadium: Koning Willem II Stadion; Attendance: 13,877; Referee: Kevin Blom

2 November 2019 12	RKC Waalwijk	2–0	Heracles Almelo	Waalwijk
20:45 CEST (UTC+2)				Stadium: Mandemakers Stadion

10 November 2019 13	Feyenoord	3–2	RKC Waalwijk	Rotterdam
16:45 CET (UTC+1)	Jørgensen 25'; Larsson 40'; Senesi 85'	Report	Maatsen 14'; Sow 19'	Stadium: De Kuip; Attendance: 47,431; Referee: Danny Makkelie

24 November 2019 14	RKC Waalwijk	1–1	Emmen	Waalwijk
12:15 CET (UTC+1)				Stadium: Mandemakers Stadion

1 December 2019 15	Utrecht	0–1	RKC Waalwijk	Utrecht
14:30 CET (UTC+1)		Report		Stadium: Stadion Galgenwaard

8 December 2019 16	RKC Waalwijk	1–3	SC Heerenveen	Waalwijk
20:15 CET (UTC+1)				Stadium: Mandemakers Stadion

14 December 2019 17	Fortuna Sittard	3–2	RKC Waalwijk	Sittard
19:45 CET (UTC+1)	Diemers 13'; Damașcan 45', 58'	Report	Mulder 8'; Leemans 31'	Stadium: Fortuna Sittard Stadion; Attendance: 8,391; Referee: Jochem Kamphuis

20 December 2019 18	RKC Waalwijk	3–0	Twente	Waalwijk
20:00 CET (UTC+1)	Tahiri 12'; Bilate (yellow card) 37'; Spierings 47', 60'	Report	Verdonk (red card) 82'	Stadium: Mandemakers Stadion; Attendance: 5,154; Referee: Martin van den Kerkhof

19 January 2020 19	ADO Den Haag	2–0	RKC Waalwijk	The Hague
16:45 CET (UTC+1)		Report		Stadium: Cars Jeans Stadion; Attendance: 12,433; Referee: Jeroen Manschot

25 January 2020 20	RKC Waalwijk	1–2	VVV-Venlo	Waalwijk
18:45 CET (UTC+1)				Stadium: Mandemakers Stadion

31 January 2020 21	AZ	4–0	RKC Waalwijk	Alkmaar
20:00 CET (UTC+1)	Idrissi 29', 51'; Boadu 36'; Stengs 65'	Report	Mulder (yellow card) 4'	Stadium: AFAS Stadion; Attendance: 14,712; Referee: Serdar Gözübüyük

8 February 2020 22	RKC Waalwijk	0–0	PEC Zwolle	Waalwijk
18:45 CET (UTC+1)				Stadium: Mandemakers Stadion

16 February 2020 23	Ajax	3–0	RKC Waalwijk	Amsterdam
14:30 CET (UTC+1)	Tadić 13' (pen.); Eiting (yellow card) 50'; Traoré 52'; Huntelaar 90'	Report	Meulensteen (yellow card) 76'; Gaari (yellow card) 78'	Stadium: Johan Cruyff Arena; Attendance: 53,291; Referee: Dennis Higler

21 February 2020 24	RKC Waalwijk	0–1	Sparta Rotterdam	Waalwijk
20:45 CET (UTC+1)				Stadium: Mandemakers Stadion

1 March 2020 25	RKC Waalwijk	2–1	Utrecht	Waalwijk
12:15 CET (UTC+1)		Report		Stadium: Mandemakers Stadion

8 March 2020 26	Heracles Almelo	4–2	RKC Waalwijk	Almelo
16:30 CET (UTC+1)				Stadium: Erve Asito

15 March 2020 27	RKC Waalwijk	Cancelled	Groningen	Waalwijk
16:30 CET (UTC+1)				Stadium: Mandemakers Stadion
Note: Match was initially scheduled for 15 March, but cancelled due to the COVID-19 pandemic in the Netherlands.

21 March 2020 28	SC Heerenveen	Cancelled	RKC Waalwijk	Heerenveen
18:30 CET (UTC+1)				Stadium: Abe Lenstra Stadion
Note: Match was initially scheduled for 21 March, but cancelled due to the COVID-19 pandemic in the Netherlands.

5 April 2020 29	RKC Waalwijk	Cancelled	Feyenoord	Waalwijk
12:15 CEST (UTC+2)				Stadium: Mandemakers Stadion
Note: Match was initially scheduled for 5 April, but cancelled due to the COVID-19 pandemic in the Netherlands.

11 April 2020 30	Vitesse	Cancelled	RKC Waalwijk	Arnhem
18:30 CEST (UTC+2)				Stadium: GelreDome
Note: Match was initially scheduled for 11 April, but cancelled due to the COVID-19 pandemic in the Netherlands.

22 April 2020 31	RKC Waalwijk	Cancelled	Willem II	Waalwijk
20:45 CEST (UTC+2)				Stadium: Mandemakers Stadion
Note: Match was initially scheduled for 22 April, but cancelled due to the COVID-19 pandemic in the Netherlands.

25 April 2020 32	Emmen	Cancelled	RKC Waalwijk	Emmen
20:30 CEST (UTC+2)				Stadium: De Oude Meerdijk
Note: Match was initially scheduled for 25 April, but cancelled due to the COVID-19 pandemic in the Netherlands.

3 May 2020 33	RKC Waalwijk	Cancelled	Fortuna Sittard	Waalwijk
18:30 CEST (UTC+2)				Stadium: Mandemakers Stadion
Note: Match was initially scheduled for 3 May, but cancelled due to the COVID-19 pandemic in the Netherlands.

10 May 2020 34	PSV	Cancelled	RKC Waalwijk	Eindhoven
14:30 CEST (UTC+2)				Stadium: Philips Stadion
Note: Match was initially scheduled for 10 May, but cancelled due to the COVID-19 pandemic in the Netherlands.

=== KNVB Cup ===
30 October 2019 First round	Heracles Almelo	4–3	RKC Waalwijk	Almelo
18:30 CET (UTC+1)	Dessers 7', 55'; Van der Water 35', 70'	Report	Maatsen 45'; Sow 53'; Leemans 62' (pen.)	Stadium: Erve Asito; Referee: Christiaan Bax
