= 2020–21 RKC Waalwijk season =

RKC Waalwijk
2020–21 season
- Chairman: Peter Konijnenburg
- Head coach: Fred Grim
- Stadium: Mandemakers Stadion
- Eredivisie: 15th
- KNVB Cup: First round
Home colours	Away colours	Third colours

The 2020–21 season was RKC Waalwijk's second consecutive season in the top flight of Dutch football, the Eredivisie. In addition to the domestic league, RKC Waalwijk participated in the KNVB Cup. The season covered the period from 1 July 2020 to 30 June 2021.

== Players ==
=== First team squad ===
As of 9 February 2021

Note: Flags indicate national team as defined under FIFA eligibility rules; some limited exceptions apply. Players may hold more than one non-FIFA nationality.

No.	Pos.	Nation	Player
1	GK	NED	Etienne Vaessen
2	DF	CUW	Juriën Gaari
3	DF	NED	Melle Meulensteen
4	MF	CUW	Vurnon Anita
5	DF	CZE	Paul Quasten
7	FW	BEL	Cyril Ngonge
8	MF	MAR	Anas Tahiri (captain)
9	FW	NED	Finn Stokkers
10	MF	NED	Richard van der Venne
11	MF	NED	Ola John
12	MF	NED	Hans Mulder
15	DF	NED	Lars Nieuwpoort
16	MF	MAR	Ayman Azhil (on loan from Bayer Leverkusen)
17	FW	NED	Morad El Haddouti
19	FW	NED	Sylla Sow
20	DF	BEL	Thierry Lutonda (on loan from Anderlecht)

No.	Pos.	Nation	Player
21	MF	BEL	Lennerd Daneels
22	GK	NED	Mike Grim
25	MF	NED	Thijs Oosting (on loan from AZ Alkmaar)
26	MF	BEL	Sebbe Augustijns
27	FW	NED	David Min
28	FW	COM	Saïd Bakari
30	FW	GRE	James Efmorfidis
31	GK	GRE	Kostas Lamprou
32	DF	NED	Nigel Langras
33	MF	NED	Yassin Oukili
34	DF	NED	Luuk Wouters
59	DF	ALG	Ahmed Touba
99	FW	MDA	Vitalie Damașcan (on loan from Torino)
—	DF	BEL	Shawn Adewoye

== Transfers ==
=== Transfers in ===
Date	Position	Name	From	Fee	Ref.
1 July 2020	GK	Kostas Lamprou	SBV Vitesse	Free transfer	
1 July 2020	MF	James Efmorfidis	Almere City	Free transfer	
10 August 2020	MF	Nico Olsak	(Israel) Maccabi Netanya	Free transfer	
29 August 2020	DF	Ahmed Touba	(Belgium) Club Brugge	Undisclosed	

=== Loans in ===
Date from	Position	Name	From	Date until	Ref.
9 July 2020	DF	Thierry Lutonda	(Belgium) Anderlecht	30 June 2020	

=== Transfers out ===
Date	Position	Name	To	Fee	Ref.
1 July 2020	FW	Jari Koenraat	Blauw Geel '38	Free transfer	
1 July 2020	DF	Henrico Drost	ASWH	Free transfer	
1 July 2020	GK	Kees Heemskerk	Unattached	Free transfer	
1 July 2020	DF	Fabian Sporkslede	Unattached	Free transfer	
1 July 2020	DF	Ingo van Weert	(Poland) Stomil Olsztyn	Free transfer	
30 July 2020	MF	Daan Rienstra	(Greece) Volos	Mutual consent	

== Competitions ==
=== Eredivisie ===
==== League table ====
Pos	Team	Pld	W	D	L	GF	GA	GD	Pts	Qualification or relegation
13	PEC Zwolle	34	9	11	14	44	53	−9	38	
14	Willem II	34	8	7	19	40	68	−28	31	
15	RKC Waalwijk	34	7	9	18	33	55	−22	30	
16	Emmen (R)	34	7	9	18	40	68	−28	30	Qualification for the Relegation play-offs (Note: Seven teams, one from the Eredivisie and six from the Eerste Divisie, play for one spot in the 2021–22 Eredivisie. The remaining six teams play in the 2021–22 Eerste Divisie.)
17	VVV-Venlo (R)	34	6	5	23	43	91	−48	23	Relegation to Eerste Divisie

Source: Eredivisie, Soccerway
Rules for classification: Season in progress: 1) Most points won; 2) Less points lost; 3) Goal difference; 4) Goals scored; 5) Alphabetical order; End of season: 1) Points; 2) Goal difference; 3) Goals scored; 4) Head-to-head points; 5) Head-to-head goal difference; 6) Head-to-head away goals scored; 7) Play-off if relevant for deciding champion, relegation or participating in a European league, otherwise by draw. 8) Penalty shoot-out (only after a play-off)
(R) Relegated

==== Matches ====
13 September 2020 1	RKC Waalwijk	0–1	SBV Vitesse	Waalwijk
16:45		Report	Darfalou 45+2'	Stadium: Mandemakers Stadion; Attendance: 1,967; Referee: Edwin van de Graaf

20 September 2020 2	AFC Ajax	3−0	RKC Waalwijk	Amsterdam
16:45	Tadić 10'; Labyad 34'; Martínez 73'	Report		Stadium: Johan Cruyff Arena; Attendance: 11,948; Referee: Bas Nijhuis

27 September 2020 3	FC Utrecht	3–1	RKC Waalwijk	Utrecht
14:30	Mahi 40'; Kerk 74'; Van de Streek 85'	Report	Damașcan 59'	Stadium: Stadion Galgenwaard; Attendance: 4,944; Referee: Siemen Mulder

17 October 2020 5	Heracles Almelo	0–1	RKC Waalwijk	Almelo
18:45		Report	Bakari 26'	Stadium: Erve Asito

21 October 2020 4	RKC Waalwijk	1–1	PEC Zwolle	Waalwijk
17:30	Stokkers 86'	Report	Reijnders 65'	Stadium: Mandemakers Stadion; Referee: Rob Dieperink

25 October 2020 6	RKC Waalwijk	2–2	Feyenoord	Waalwijk
16:45	Ngonge 50'; John 80'	Report	62' Jørgensen; 84' Haps	Stadium: Mandemakers Stadion; Attendance: 0 Referee: Jochem Kamphuis

1 November 2020 7	AZ Alkmaar	3–0	RKC Waalwijk	Alkmaar
20:00	Stengs 5'; Guðmundsson 72', 90+1'	Report		Stadium: AFAS Stadion; Attendance: 0 Referee: Martin van den Kerkhof

7 November 2020 8	RKC Waalwijk	0–2	Sparta Rotterdam	Waalwijk
21:00		Report	Thy 59'; Harroui 90+2'	Stadium: Mandemakers Stadion; Attendance: 0 Referee: Ingmar Oostrom

22 November 2020 9	RKC Waalwijk	1–1	SC Heerenveen	Waalwijk
16:45 CET (UTC+1)	Damașcan 82'	Report	H. Veerman 19'	Stadium: Mandemakers Stadion; Attendance: 0 Referee: Christiaan Bax

27 November 2020 10	FC Twente	0–2	RKC Waalwijk	Enschede
20:00 CET (UTC+1)		Report	Ngonge 22'; Stokkers 30'	Stadium: De Grolsch Veste; Attendance: 0 Referee: Richard Martens

5 December 2020 11	RKC Waalwijk	3–2	VVV-Venlo	Waalwijk
16:30	Stokkers 30'; Touba 75'; Daneels 87'	Report	Giakoumakis 35' (pen.); Van Crooij 51'	Stadium: Mandemakers Stadion; Attendance: 0 Referee: Edwin van de Graaf

12 December 2020 12	FC Groningen	2–0	RKC Waalwijk	Groningen
16:30 CET (UTC+1)	El Messaoudi 54'; Van Kaam 76'	Report		Stadium: Hitachi Capital Mobility Stadion; Attendance: 0 Referee: Jannick van der Laan

19 December 2020 13	RKC Waalwijk	1–4	PSV Eindhoven	Waalwijk
20:00	Stokkers 86'	Report	Gakpo 11'; Ihattaren 14'; Dumfries 71' (pen.); Madueke 90+5'	Stadium: Mandemakers Stadion; Attendance: 0 Referee: Kevin Blom

22 December 2020 14	Fortuna Sittard	2–1	RKC Waalwijk	Sittard
16:30	Polter 45'; Semedo 90+2'	Report	Stokkers 15'	Stadium: Fortuna Sittard Stadion; Attendance: 0 Referee: Marc Nagtegaal

9 January 2021 15	RKC Waalwijk	0–1	ADO Den Haag	Waalwijk
16:30		Report	Kemper 17'	Stadium: Mandemakers Stadion; Attendance: 0 Referee: Serdar Gözübüyük

14 January 2021 16	SC Heerenveen	1–1	RKC Waalwijk	Heerenveen
18:45	H. Veerman 7'	Report	Van der Venne 56'	Stadium: Abe Lenstra Stadion; Attendance: 0 Referee: Martin van den Kerkhof

17 January 2021 17	RKC Waalwijk	1–1	Willem II	Waalwijk
12:15	Tahiri 47'	Report	Wriedt 59'	Stadium: Mandemakers Stadion; Attendance: 0 Referee: Allard Lindhout

23 January 2021 18	PSV Eindhoven	2–0	RKC Waalwijk	Eindhoven
20:00 CET (UTC+1)	Zahavi 45+1'; Rosario 73'	Report		Stadium: Philips Stadion; Attendance: 0 Referee: Danny Makkelie

27 January 2021 19	RKC Waalwijk	1–2	Fortuna Sittard	Waalwijk
20:00 CET (UTC+1)	Min 84'	Report	Seuntjens 54'; Semedo 63'	Stadium: Mandemakers Stadion; Attendance: 0 Referee: Laurens Gerrets

30 January 2021 20	SBV Vitesse	1–1	RKC Waalwijk	Arnhem
21:00 CET (UTC+1)	Bazoer 71'	Report	Van der Venne 75'	Stadium: GelreDome; Attendance: 0 Referee: Richard Martens

6 February 2021 21	PEC Zwolle	1–1	RKC Waalwijk	Zwolle
14:00 CET (UTC+1)	Saymak 72'	Report	Touba 4'	Stadium: MAC³PARK Stadion; Attendance: 0 Referee: Björn Kuipers

12 February 2021 22	RKC Waalwijk	1–0	FC Emmen	Waalwijk
18:45 CET (UTC+1)	Touba 90'	Report		Stadium: Mandemakers Stadion; Attendance: 0 Referee: Edwin van de Graaf

21 February 2021 23	RKC Waalwijk	3–0	Heracles Almelo	Waalwijk
14:30 CET (UTC+1)	John 11'; Daneels 23'; Van der Venne 75'	Report		Stadium: Mandemakers Stadion; Attendance: 0 Referee: Christiaan Bax

27 February 2021 24	ADO Den Haag	0–0	RKC Waalwijk	The Hague
18:45 CET (UTC+1)		Report		Stadium: Cars Jeans Stadion; Attendance: 0 Referee: Jochem Kamphuis

6 March 2021 25	RKC Waalwijk	1–2	FC Utrecht	Waalwijk
21:00 CET (UTC+1)	Van der Venne 53'	Report	Mahi 12'; Van de Streek 90+7' (pen.)	Stadium: Mandemakers Stadion; Attendance: 0 Referee: Sander van der Eijk

13 March 2021 26	Sparta Rotterdam	2–0	RKC Waalwijk	Rotterdam
21:00 CET (UTC+1)	Beugelsdijk 57'; Smeets 90+3'	Report		Stadium: Het Kasteel; Attendance: 0 Referee: Rob Dieperink

20 March 2021 27	RKC Waalwijk	3–1	FC Groningen	Waalwijk
21:00 CET (UTC+1)	Oosting 5', 15'; Sow 86'	Report	El Messaoudi 33'	Stadium: Mandemakers Stadion; Attendance: 0 Referee: Edwin van de Graaf

4 April 2021 28	FC Emmen	3–1	RKC Waalwijk	Emmen
16:45 CEST (UTC+2)	Bakker 10'; Adžić 17'; Peña 32'	Report	Ngonge 90+2'	Stadium: De Oude Meerdijk; Attendance: 0 Referee: Danny Makkelie

11 April 2021 29	RKC Waalwijk	0–1	AFC Ajax	Waalwijk
16:45 CEST (UTC+2)		Report	Haller 14'	Stadium: Mandemakers Stadion; Attendance: 0 Referee: Bas Nijhuis

23 April 2021 30	Willem II	1–0	RKC Waalwijk	Tilburg
20:00 CEST (UTC+2)	Pavlidis 54'	Report		Stadium: Koning Willem II Stadion; Attendance: 2,000; Referee: Danny Makkelie

1 May 2021 31	RKC Waalwijk	1–3	AZ Alkmaar	Waalwijk
20:00 CEST (UTC+2)	Oosting 17'	Report	Guðmundsson 28'; Boadu 63'; Stengs 82'	Stadium: Mandemakers Stadion; Attendance: 0 Referee: Dennis Higler

8 May 2021 32	VVV-Venlo	3–3	RKC Waalwijk	Venlo
21:00 CEST (UTC+2)	Giakoumakis 3'; John 44'; Van Crooij 79'	Report	Oosting 14'; Ngonge 33', 84' (pen.)	Stadium: De Koel; Attendance: 0 Referee: Jochem Kamphuis

13 May 2021 33	RKC Waalwijk	2–1	FC Twente	Waalwijk
14:30 CEST (UTC+2)	Sow 48', 54'	Report	Danilo 47'	Stadium: Mandemakers Stadion; Attendance: 0 Referee: Martin van den Kerkhof

16 May 2021 34	Feyenoord	3–0	RKC Waalwijk	Rotterdam
14:30 CEST (UTC+2)	Jørgensen 37'; Toornstra 43'; Berghuis 49'	Report		Stadium: De Kuip; Attendance: 0 Referee: Bas Nijhuis

=== KNVB Cup ===
28 October 2020	RKC Waalwijk	2–2 (a.e.t.) (3–5 p)	SC Cambuur	Waalwijk
19:45	Daneels 85'; Gaari 90+4'	Report	31' Pouwels; 40' Jacobs	Stadium: Mandemakers Stadion; Attendance: 0 Referee: Martens
	Penalties
	Tahiri (penalty scored); Meultensteen (penalty missed); Damașcan (penalty scored); Azhil (penalty scored)		(penalty scored) Gootjes; (penalty scored) Hoedemakers; (penalty scored) Paulissen; (penalty scored) Nieuwpoort; (penalty scored) Maulun
