= Dylan Vente =

Surinamese footballer (born 1999)

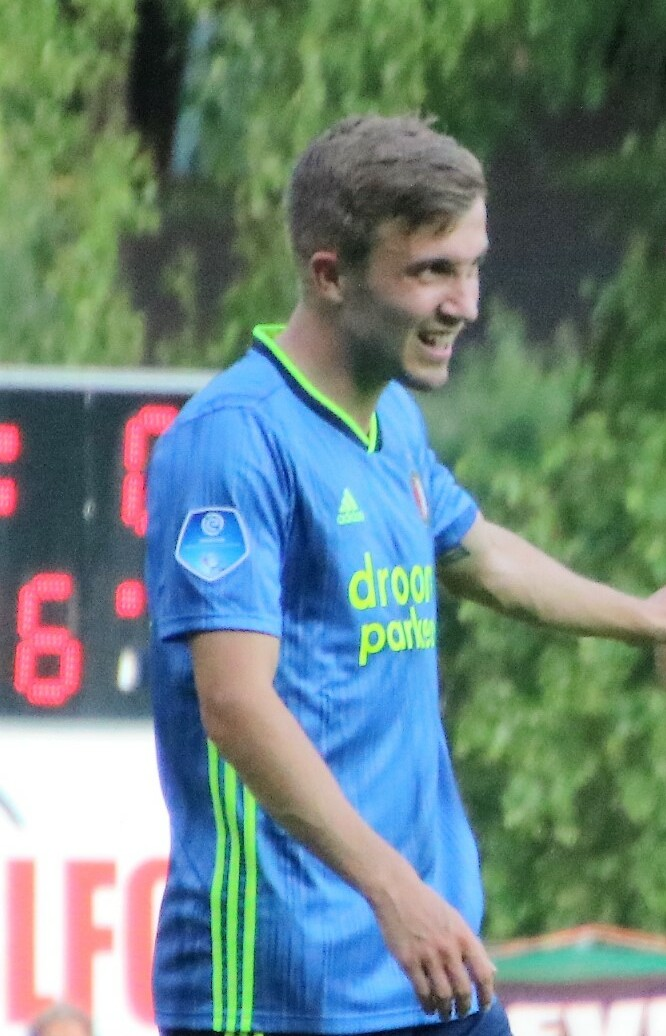
- Vente with Feyenoord in 2019

Personal information
- Date of birth: 9 May 1999 (age 27)
- Place of birth: Rotterdam, Netherlands
- Height: 1.81 m (5 ft 11 in)
- Position: Forward

Team information
- Current team: Heerenveen
- Number: 9

Youth career
- Smitshoek
- 2008–2017: Feyenoord

Senior career*
Years	Team	Apps	(Gls)
2017–2021	Feyenoord	24	(4)
2019–2020	→ RKC (loan)	17	(0)
2021	→ Roda JC (loan)	15	(4)
2021–2023	Roda JC	70	(42)
2023–2025	Hibernian	32	(5)
2024–2025	→ PEC Zwolle (loan)	30	(13)
2025–	Heerenveen	40	(8)

International career^{‡}
2015	Netherlands U16	2	(0)
2015–2016	Netherlands U17	16	(7)
2016	Netherlands U18	4	(2)
2017	Netherlands U19	1	(0)
2018–2019	Netherlands U20	13	(5)
2024	Suriname	4	(0)
- * Club domestic league appearances and goals as of 13:30, 29 October 2026 (UTC) ‡ National team caps and goals as of 20 November 2024

Dylan Vente (born 9 May 1999) is a professional footballer who plays as a forward for Eredivisie club Heerenveen. Born in the Netherlands, he represents the Suriname national team.

Dylan Vente, the great-nephew of former Feyenoord legend Leen Vente, came up through Feyenoord's youth academy, joining when he was nine years old. He signed his first professional contract with the club in November 2015 and made his debut for the first team during the 2017–18 season. Afterward, he spent time on loan with both RKC Waalwijk and Roda JC from 2019 to 2021 before sealing a permanent deal with the latter club at the end of his loan spell. During his time at Roda, he earned recognition for his impressive goal-scoring skills, finishing as one of the top scorers in the Dutch second tier during the 2021–22 season.

In 2023, Vente made a move to the Scottish Premiership club Hibernian. After one season with Hibs and a second on loan to PEC Zwolle, Vente joined Heerenveen in 2025.

Vente represented the Netherlands in youth internationals up to and including the under-20 level. He switched his nationality in 2024 to Suriname.

== Club career ==
=== Feyenoord ===
Vente started his career with VV Smitshoek in Barendrecht. At the age of nine, he joined Feyenoord's youth academy. He signed his first professional contract in November 2015.

From the 2017–18 season, Vente became part of their first team. He made his official debut on 13 September 2017 in an UEFA Champions League home match against Manchester City, coming off the bench for Michiel Kramer in the 72nd minute.

Vente made his Eredivisie debut for Feyenoord on 17 September 2017 in a game against PSV. He scored his first goal on 17 December 2017 in a 7–0 win against Sparta Rotterdam, almost a carbon copy of his great-uncle Leen Vente's goal against Beerschot in 1937, which was the first ever goal in Feyenoord's home ground, De Kuip.

==== 2019–20: Loan to RKC ====
On 23 August 2019, Vente joined newly promoted Eredivisie club RKC Waalwijk on loan until the end of the 2019–20 season. He made his RKC debut on 25 August 2019, replacing Paul Quasten in the 79th minute of a 3–0 loss to ADO Den Haag. Vente made only 18 appearance for the club, as he struggled with injuries. The season ended prematurely due to the COVID-19 pandemic.

==== 2020–21: Return to Feyenoord ====
At the beginning of the 2020–21 season, Vente was permanently placed in Feyenoord's under-21 team, and was given jersey number 58. In November 2020, however, Vente was mainly a part of the first-team squad, making his return to the pitch for Feyenoord on 23 December 2020, replacing Luciano Narsingh in the 78th minute of a 3–0 home win over Heerenveen.

=== Roda JC ===
On 28 January 2021, he moved to Roda JC on loan, who competed in the second-tier Eerste Divisie. He made his Roda debut on 30 January 2021, coming off the bench for Fabian Serrarens in the 75th minute of a 5–0 away victory against Dordrecht. On 15 February 2021, Vente scored his first goal for the club in a 3–1 win over Excelsior. During his six-month loan stint, he made 17 appearances in which he scored five goals.

On 4 August 2021, Vente signed a permanent deal until 2023 with Roda JC. He quickly grew into an undisputed starter for the club, and a proven goalscorer. On 3 December 2021, Vente scored his first hat-trick in a 5–2 league win over Dordrecht. He also scored a hat-trick in the return game against Dordrecht on 4 March 2022, heavily contributing to a 4–0 home win. Vente finished the 2021–22 season with 25 goals and seven assists in 42 total appearances for Roda, finishing fourth among Eerste Divisie top goalscorers.

=== Hibernian ===
Vente signed a three-year contract with Scottish Premiership club Hibernian on 31 July 2023, moving for a transfer fee of around £700,000. He scored on his Hibs debut ten days later, in a Europa Conference League game against Swiss club Luzern.

==== Loan to PEC Zwolle ====
On 15 August 2024, Vente returned to the Netherlands and joined PEC Zwolle on loan. He scored 13 goals as Zwolle finished tenth in the 2024–25 Eredivisie table.

=== Heerenveen ===
Vente moved to Heerenveen in June 2025 for a fee of around £1 million, signing a four-year contract.

== International career ==
Born in the Netherlands, Vente is of Dutch and Surinamese descent. He represented the Netherlands at all age-group levels up to under-20. On 7 March 2024 the Surinamese Football Association released a preselection for their upcoming match against Martinique, listing Vente as one of the forwards being called up. This selection was later rectified, but revealed that Vente is eligible to play for Suriname. He was included in the Suriname squad in September 2024, and he made his full international debut in a 3–1 win against Guyana on 5 September. As of September 2025, Vente has stated to have stopped international duty due to the long flights between Suriname and the Netherlands.

== Personal life ==
Vente is the great-nephew of former Feyenoord legend Leen Vente, who scored 65 goals in 82 appearances for the club between 1936 and 1941.

In February 2023, Vente and Roda JC teammate Guus Joppen were involved in a scuffle at a night club in Heerlen during Carnival celebrations, which left both with injuries. A man was later arrested, who had attacked Joppen and Vente.

== Career statistics ==
As of match played on 28 October 2026

Appearances and goals by club, season and competition
Club	Season	League			National cup (Note: Includes KNVB Cup, Scottish Cup)		Europe		Other		Total	
Club	Season	Division	Apps	Goals	Apps	Goals	Apps	Goals	Apps	Goals	Apps	Goals
Feyenoord	2017–18	Eredivisie	9	3	2	0	1 (Note: Appearance(s) in UEFA Champions League)	0	0	0	12	3
Feyenoord	2018–19	Eredivisie	13	1	3	3	2 (Note: Appearance(s) in UEFA Europa League)	0	1 (Note: Appearance in Johan Cruyff Shield)	0	19	4
Feyenoord	2019–20	Eredivisie	1	0	0	0	0	0	—		1	0
Feyenoord	2020–21	Eredivisie	1	0	0	0	0	0	—		1	0
Feyenoord	Total		24	4	5	3	3	0	1	0	33	7
RKC (loan)	2019–20	Eredivisie	17	0	1	0	—		—		18	0
Roda JC (loan)	2020–21	Eerste Divisie	15	4	0	0	—		2 (Note: Appearances in Eerste Divisie promotion play offs)	1	17	5
Roda JC	2021–22	Eerste Divisie	38	23	2	1	—		2	1	42	25
Roda JC	2022–23	Eerste Divisie	38	21	1	0	—		—		39	21
Roda JC	Total		85	46	3	1	0	0	4	2	98	51
Hibernian	2023–24	Scottish Premiership	30	5	1	0	3 (Note: Appearance(s) in UEFA Europa Conference League)	1	3 (Note: Appearance(s) in the Scottish League Cup)	2	37	8
Hibernian	2024–25	Scottish Premiership	2	0	0	0	—		4	3	6	3
Hibernian	Total		32	5	1	0	3	1	7	5	43	11
PEC Zwolle (loan)	2024–25	Eredivisie	30	13	1	1	—		—		31	14
Heerenveen	2025–26	Eredivisie	30	7	3	1	—		1 (Note: Appearance in Eredivisie play-offs)	1	34	9
Heerenveen	2026–27	Eredivisie	10	1	1	1	—		—		11	2
Heerenveen	Total		40	8	4	2	—		1	1	45	11
Career total			243	80	15	7	6	1	13	8	277	96

== Honours ==
Feyenoord

- KNVB Cup: 2017–18
- Johan Cruijff Shield: 2017, 2018

Individual

- Eredivisie Team of the Month: February 2025
