= Emil Hansson =

Footballer (born 1998)

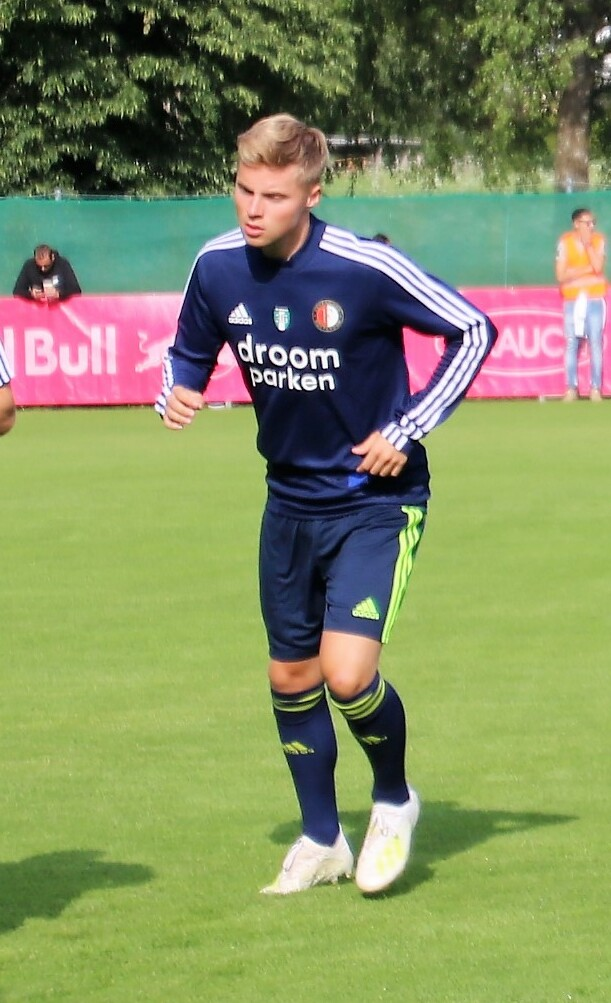
- Hansson in 2019

Personal information
- Full name: Emil Hansson
- Date of birth: 15 June 1998 (age 28)
- Place of birth: Bergen, Norway
- Height: 1.72 m (5 ft 8 in)
- Positions: Left winger; left midfielder

Team information
- Current team: Zaragoza

Youth career
- –2012: Brann
- 2013: Kalmar
- 2013–2014: Brann
- 2015–2017: Feyenoord

Senior career*
Years	Team	Apps	(Gls)
2013–2014	Brann 3	9	(4)
2014–2015	Brann 2	29	(5)
2015	Brann	2	(0)
2017–2019	Feyenoord	3	(0)
2018–2019	→ RKC Waalwijk (loan)	35	(12)
2019–2020	Hannover 96	14	(0)
2019	Hannover 96 II	1	(0)
2020	→ RKC Waalwijk (loan)	7	(1)
2020–2022	Fortuna Sittard	43	(2)
2022–2024	Heracles Almelo	73	(21)
2024–2026	Birmingham City	20	(1)
2025	→ Blackpool (loan)	17	(0)
2026	Excelsior	12	(1)
2026	Zaragoza	0	(0)

International career
2013	Sweden U17	4	(0)
2014	Norway U16	10	(1)
2015	Norway U17	10	(1)
2016	Norway U18	9	(2)
2017	Norway U19	3	(0)
2019–2020	Sweden U21	10	(4)
- * Club domestic league appearances and goals as of 10 May 2026

Emil Hansson (born 15 June 1998) is a professional footballer who most recently played as a left winger or left midfielder for Primera Federación – Group 2 club Real Zaragoza. Born in Norway, he is a former youth international for both Norway and Sweden.

Hansson is the son of former Swedish footballer Patrik Hansson. The brother of Emil Hansson's grandfather is Tommy Svensson.

== Club career ==
=== Brann ===
Hansson, son of a Norwegian mother, and the former Swedish professional footballer Patrik Hansson, began playing football in his hometown Bergen for Brann, before moving to the youth academy of Swedish Allsvenskan club Kalmar prior the 2013 season, where his father worked as assistant coach. After six months, he returned to Brann.

There, he was promoted to the first team for the 2015 season, where he made his first two senior appearances in April 2015, one in the cup and one in the league. In total he got two league appearances and four in the 2015 Norwegian Football Cup.

=== Feyenoord ===
Hansson joined the youth academy of Dutch Eredivisie club Feyenoord in August 2015. He initially played for the U21 team but made his debut in the Eredivisie on 12 March 2017 in a 5–2 home win over AZ, coming on as an 83rd-minute substitute for Steven Berghuis. For the first team he made a total of two appearances during the 2016–17 season, while continuing as a part of the U21 side and reserves; the first team won the Dutch championship at the end of the season, after an 18-year title drought. The following season, Hansson made eleven appearances for the reserves and two total appearances for the first team, in the KNVB Beker and in the league, respectively. Feyenoord finished third in the Eredivisie that season and won the cup; the 100th edition of the tournament.

In July 2018, Hansson moved to the second-tier Eerste Divisie on loan to RKC Waalwijk. With twelve goals from Hansson in 35 league appearances, the club reached ninth place in the league table and qualified for the first round of the promotion and relegation play-offs. By scoring one goal in six appearances, Hansson contributed to helping RKC achieve promotion to the Eredivisie. He returned to Feyenoord after his loan deal expired.

=== Hannover 96 ===
In August 2019, Hansson moved to German 2. Bundesliga club Hannover 96 on a three-year contract. The Swede made 14 2. Bundesliga appearances as well as one in the Regionalliga Nord for the reserve team before being loaned out to RKC Waalwijk once again for the second half of the season. Hansson made seven league appearances for RKC, in which he scored one goal, before the season was cancelled after the 26th match-day due to the COVID-19 pandemic. At this point, RKC was bottom of the table, but was able to remain in the Eredivisie due to a suspension of relegations.

=== Fortuna Sittard ===
At the beginning of June 2020, Hannover 96 announced that Hansson would not return to the team, but would move on a permanent deal to Eredivisie side Fortuna Sittard for the 2020–21 season.

=== Heracles ===
On 29 January 2022, Hansson returned to the Dutch Eredivisie, where he signed a two-and-a-half-year contract with Heracles, with an option for an additional year. He made his debut for the club on 11 February, replacing Bilal Başacıkoğlu in the 88th minute of a 1–0 win over Utrecht. On the last matchday of the season, Heracles dropped to 16th in the league table following a 3–1 defeat to Sparta Rotterdam, meaning promotion and relegation play-offs. In the semi-final, the club faced Excelsior and suffered losses in both the first leg (0–3) and the second leg (1–3), leading to their relegation to the Eerste Divisie.

During their single season in the Eerste Divisie, Hansson evolved into a crucial player for Heracles, netting 16 goals and providing 19 assists in 36 league starts as they clinched the second-tier title and secured promotion back to the Eredivisie on the final matchday. His 19 assists from 1 March 2022, to 1 March 2023, were particularly noteworthy, surpassing the figures of prominent players such as Kevin De Bruyne, Lionel Messi and Ousmane Dembélé, among others.

=== Birmingham City ===
On 5 July 2024, recently relegated English League One club Birmingham City signed Hansson on a three-year contract. The fee was undisclosed. He made his debut in the opening fixture of the season, replacing Siriki Dembélé at half-time with Birmingham 1–0 down at home to Reading; with little time remaining, his cross was handled by an opponent and Alfie May tied the scores with the resultant penalty.

==== Blackpool (loan) ====
On 1 August 2025, Hansson joined Blackpool on a season-long loan. He was recalled in January 2026, having played 17 league games for the League One side.

=== Excelsior ===
In January 2026, Hansson joined Eredivisie club Excelsior on a permanent transfer, signing a contract running until the end of the 2025–26 season. He made his debut for the club on 10 January, replacing Gyan de Regt in the 61st minute of a 5–1 loss to PSV. On 6 February, he scored his first goal for Excelsior in a 2–0 away victory against NAC Breda.

=== Zaragoza ===
On 9 July 2026, Hansson switched teams and countries again, signing a two-year contract with Real Zaragoza of the Spanish Primera Federación.

== International career ==
Hansson gained four caps for the Sweden national under-17 team, but later decided to play for Norway. As a result, he appeared in 10 matches each for Norway U16s and U17s, nine for the U18s and three for the U19s.

In December 2018, Hansson finally decided on representing Sweden, and on 22 March 2019, he appeared in a friendly against Russia in Marbella, Spain, for the first time for the Sweden national under-21 team.

== Career statistics ==
=== Club ===
As of match played 10 May 2026

Appearances and goals by club, season and competition
Club	Season	League			National cup (Note: Includes Norwegian Football Cup, KNVB Cup, FA Cup)		League cup (Note: Includes EFL Cup)		Europe		Other		Total	
Club	Season	Division	Apps	Goals	Apps	Goals	Apps	Goals	Apps	Goals	Apps	Goals	Apps	Goals
Brann	2015	First Division	2	0	4	0	—		—		—		6	0
Feyenoord	2016–17	Eredivisie	2	0	0	0	—		0	0	—		2	0
Feyenoord	2017–18	Eredivisie	1	0	1	0	—		0	0	0	0	2	0
Feyenoord	Total		3	0	1	0	—		0	0	0	0	4	0
RKC Waalwijk (loan)	2018–19	Eerste Divisie	35	12	3	0	—		—		6 (Note: Appearances in Eredivisie promotion/relegation playoffs)	1	44	13
Hannover 96	2019–20	2. Bundesliga	14	0	0	0	—		—		—		14	0
Hannover 96 II	2019–20	Regionalliga Nord	1	0	—		—		—		—		1	0
RKC Waalwijk (loan)	2019–20	Eredivisie	7	1	0	0	—		—		—		7	1
Fortuna Sittard	2020–21	Eredivisie	32	2	2	0	—		—		—		34	2
Fortuna Sittard	2021–22	Eredivisie	11	0	2	0	—		—		—		13	0
Fortuna Sittard	Total		43	2	4	0	—		—		0	0	47	2
Heracles	2021–22	Eredivisie	13	0	0	0	—		—		2	0	15	0
Heracles	2022–23	Eerste Divisie	36	16	2	0	—		—		—		38	16
Heracles	2023–24	Eredivisie	24	5	1	0	—		—		—		25	5
Heracles	Total		73	21	3	0	—		—		2	0	78	21
Birmingham City	2024–25	League One	20	1	0	0	2	0	—		2 (Note: Appearances in EFL Trophy)	1	24	2
Blackpool (loan)	2025–26	League One	17	0	2	0	1	0	—		4	2	24	2
Excelsior	2025–26	Eredivisie	12	1	0	0	—		—		—		12	1
Career total			227	38	17	0	3	0	—		14	4	261	42

== Honours ==
Feyenoord

- Eredivisie: 2016–17
- KNVB Cup: 2017–18
- Johan Cruijff Shield: 2017

Heracles

- Eerste Divisie: 2022–23

Birmingham City

- EFL League One: 2024–25

Individual

- Eerste Divisie Team of the Year: 2022–23
- Eerste Divisie Top Assists Provider: 2022–23
