= Melle Meulensteen =

Dutch footballer (born 1999)

Personal information
- Date of birth: 4 July 1999 (age 27)
- Place of birth: Nijmegen, Netherlands
- Positions: Defensive midfielder; centre-back

Team information
- Current team: Go Ahead Eagles
- Number: 21

Youth career
- Manchester United
- 2014–2017: Preston North End

Senior career*
| Years | Team | Apps | (Gls) |
| 2017–2018 | Preston North End | 0 | (0) |
| 2017 | → Lancaster City (loan) | 11 | (3) |
| 2018–2022 | RKC Waalwijk | 118 | (6) |
| 2022–2024 | Vitesse | 59 | (2) |
| 2024–2025 | Sampdoria | 25 | (3) |
| 2025– | Go Ahead Eagles | 43 | (6) |
- * Club domestic league appearances and goals as of 23 October 2026

Melle Meulensteen (born 4 July 1999) is a Dutch professional footballer who plays as a defensive midfielder or a centre-back for Eredivisie club Go Ahead Eagles.

== Club career ==
Born in Nijmegen and grew up in Beugen, Meulensteen started his youth career with the academy of English club Manchester United, before moving to the academy of Preston North End in 2014. He further went on to captain the youth side. In July 2017, he was promoted to the first team and scored a goal on his debut (friendly match) against Bamber Bridge. On 8 September, he joined non-league Lancaster City on a loan deal till January 2018 to get first-team opportunities. His contract was terminated by mutual agreement on 23 January.

On the same day, Meulensteen signed for Eerste Divisie club RKC Waalwijk after agreeing to a deal which would keep him in the club until the summer of 2019. On 26 January, he made his debut against Jong Ajax.

On 30 June 2022, Meulensteen signed a four-year contract with Vitesse.

On 25 July 2024, Meulensteen moved to Sampdoria in Italy on a three-year deal.

On 5 August 2025, Meulensteen returned to the Netherlands and joined Go Ahead Eagles with a four-year contract.

== Personal life ==
Meulensteen is the son of René Meulensteen, who was an assistant manager at Manchester United and the Australia national team. His sister is sports broadcaster Pien Meulensteen.

== Career statistics ==
As of matches played 27 October 2026

Appearances and goals by club, season and competition
| Club | Season | League | | | National cup (Note: Includes FA Cup, KNVB Cup, Coppa Italia) | | Europe | | Other | | Total | |
| Club | Season | Division | Apps | Goals | Apps | Goals | Apps | Goals | Apps | Goals | Apps | Goals |
|---|---|---|---|---|---|---|---|---|---|---|---|---|
| Preston North End | 2017–18 | Championship | 0 | 0 | 0 | 0 | — | | — | | 0 | 0 |
| Lancaster City (loan) | 2017–18 | National League | 11 | 3 | 3 | 1 | — | | — | | 14 | 4 |
| RKC Waalwijk | 2017–18 | Eerste Divisie | 9 | 0 | — | | — | | — | | 9 | 0 |
| RKC Waalwijk | 2018–19 | Eerste Divisie | 29 | 1 | 1 | 0 | — | | 5 (Note: Appearances in Eredivisie promotion play-offs) | 0 | 35 | 1 |
| RKC Waalwijk | 2019–20 | Eredivisie | 14 | 3 | 1 | 0 | — | | — | | 15 | 3 |
| RKC Waalwijk | 2020–21 | Eredivisie | 33 | 0 | 1 | 0 | — | | — | | 34 | 0 |
| RKC Waalwijk | 2021–22 | Eredivisie | 33 | 2 | 4 | 0 | — | | — | | 37 | 2 |
| RKC Waalwijk | Total | | 118 | 6 | 7 | 0 | — | | 5 | 0 | 130 | 6 |
| Vitesse | 2022–23 | Eredivisie | 32 | 1 | 1 | 0 | — | | — | | 33 | 1 |
| Vitesse | 2023–24 | Eredivisie | 27 | 1 | 2 | 0 | — | | — | | 29 | 1 |
| Vitesse | Total | | 59 | 2 | 3 | 0 | — | | — | | 62 | 2 |
| Sampdoria | 2024–25 | Serie B | 25 | 3 | 3 | 0 | — | | 2 (Note: Appearances in Serie B Play-offs) | 1 | 30 | 4 |
| Go Ahead Eagles | 2025–26 | Eredivisie | 34 | 5 | 3 | 0 | 8 (Note: Appearances in UEFA Europa League) | 0 | — | | 45 | 5 |
| Go Ahead Eagles | 2026–27 | Eredivisie | 9 | 1 | 1 | 1 | — | | — | | 10 | 2 |
| Go Ahead Eagles | Total | | 43 | 6 | 4 | 1 | 8 | 0 | — | | 55 | 7 |
| Career total | | | 256 | 20 | 20 | 2 | 8 | 0 | 7 | 1 | 291 | 23 |
