= Juriën Gaari =

Curaçaoan footballer (born 1993)

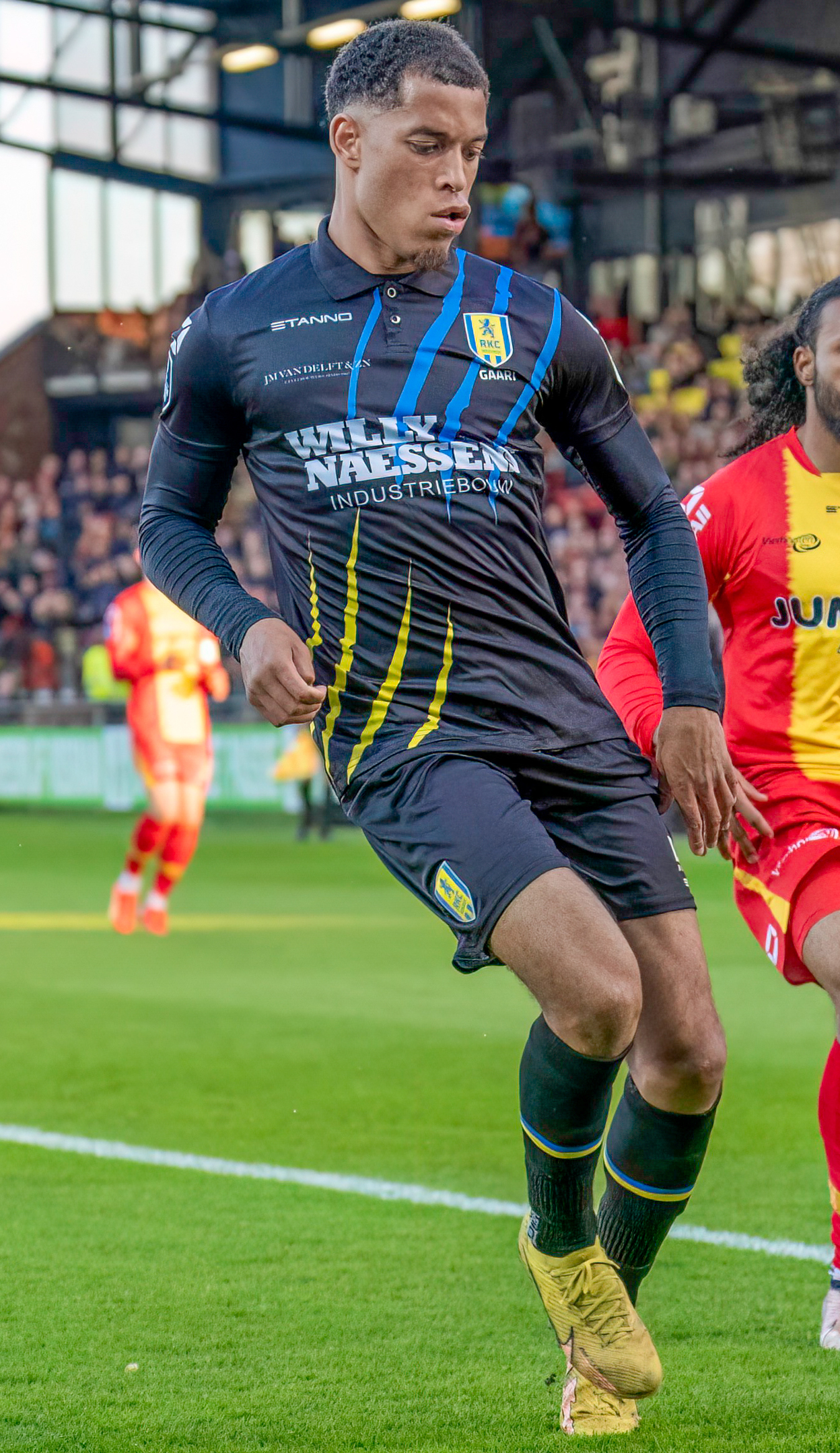

Personal information
- Full name: Juriën Godfried Juan Gaari
- Date of birth: 23 December 1993 (age 32)
- Place of birth: Kerkrade, Netherlands
- Height: 1.80 m (5 ft 11 in)
- Positions: Centre-back; right back

Team information
- Current team: Abha
- Number: 3

Youth career
- De Musschen
- Overmaas
- 2007–2012: Excelsior

Senior career*
Years	Team	Apps	(Gls)
2012–2014	Smitshoek		
2014–2018	Kozakken Boys	114	(4)
2018–2024	RKC	157	(3)
2024–2025	Al-Hazem	32	(1)
2025–	Abha	38	(0)

International career^{‡}
2016–	Curaçao	66	(1)
- * Club domestic league appearances and goals as of 14 September 2026 ‡ National team caps and goals as of 4 October 2026

Juriën Godfried Juan Gaari (born 23 December 1993) is a professional footballer for Saudi Pro League club Abha. Born in the Netherlands, he plays for the Curaçao national team.

== Club career ==
Gaari grew up in Rotterdam and played in youth departments of amateur clubs De Musschen and Overmaas Rotterdam before joining the amateur section of Excelsior. He left the club in 2012 to play for VV Smitshoek. Between 2012 and 2014, he was a regular starter for the club and made a KNVB Cup appearance against NAC Breda, among other things. He later played for Kozakken Boys, where he quickly became a permanent starter.

After four seasons and a promotion, Gaari joined professional club RKC Waalwijk. He made his debut for the first team on 17 August 2018, in a 1–0 home win over Telstar.

After his contract with Waalwijk expired, Gaari joined Saudi Second Division club Al-Hazem.

On 6 August 2025, Gaari joined Saudi First Division League side Abha.

== International career ==
He played for Curaçao at the 2017 and 2019 CONCACAF Gold Cup. He scored his first goal for Curaçao on 25 June 2019, in the latter tournament against Jamaica, a late equalizer that gave the team a 1–1 draw.

On 18 May 2026, he was named by head coach Dick Advocaat in the 26-man squad for the 2026 FIFA World Cup, marking the country's first-ever appearance at the tournament.

== Career statistics ==
=== Club ===
As of 14 September 2026

Appearances and goals by club, season and competition
Club	Season	League			National cup		Other		Total	
Club	Season	Division	Apps	Goals	Apps	Goals	Apps	Goals	Apps	Goals
Kozakken Boys	2015–16	—	—		2	0	—		2	0
Kozakken Boys	2016–17	Tweede Divisie	30	0	0	0	—		30	0
Kozakken Boys	2017–18	Tweede Divisie	33	2	1	0	—		34	2
Kozakken Boys	Total		63	2	3	0	—		66	2
Waalwijk	2018–19	Eerste Divisie	37	0	2	0	6 (Note: Appearances in Promotion/relegation play-offs)	1	45	1
Waalwijk	2019–20	Eredivisie	18	0	0	0	—		18	0
Waalwijk	2020–21	Eredivisie	9	0	1	1	—		10	1
Waalwijk	2021–22	Eredivisie	30	2	3	0	—		33	2
Waalwijk	2022–23	Eredivisie	33	0	0	0	—		33	0
Waalwijk	2023–24	Eredivisie	29	1	1	0	—		30	1
Waalwijk	Total		156	3	7	1	6	1	169	5
Al-Hazem	2024–25	Saudi First Division League	2	1	1	0	—		3	1
Abha	2025–26	Saudi First Division League	31	0	1	0	—		32	0
Abha	2026–27	Saudi Pro League	7	0	1	0	—		8	0
Abha	Total		38	0	2	0	—		40	0
Career total			259	6	13	1	6	1	278	8

=== International ===
As of match played 4 October 2026

Appearances and goals by national team and year
National team	Year	Apps	Goals
Curaçao	2016	2	0
Curaçao	2017	4	0
Curaçao	2018	1	0
Curaçao	2019	10	1
Curaçao	2021	8	0
Curaçao	2022	3	0
Curaçao	2023	9	0
Curaçao	2024	8	0
Curaçao	2025	11	0
Curaçao	2026	10	0
Total		66	1

Scores and results list Curaçao's goal tally first, score column indicates score after each Gaari goal.

List of international goals scored by Juriën Gaari
No.	Date	Venue	Opponent	Score	Result	Competition
1	25 June 2019	Banc of California Stadium, Los Angeles, United States	Jamaica	1–1	1–1	2019 CONCACAF Gold Cup

== Honors ==
Curaçao

- Caribbean Cup: 2017
- King's Cup: 2019
