= Patrik Hansson =

Swedish footballer (born 1969)

Personal information
- Date of birth: 20 September 1969 (age 57)
- Place of birth: Växjö, Sweden
- Position: Midfielder

Senior career*
Years	Team	Apps	(Gls)
1988–1991	Östers IF	7	(0)
1992–1993	Brann	20	(3)
1993	Sogndal	11	(2)
1994	Jonsereds IF	11	(1)
1995	Fana		

International career
1986–1988	Sweden U19	7	(3)

Managerial career
- 2011–2012: Brann (assistant)
- 2017–2018: Fana
- 2019–2020: Sandviken women
- * Club domestic league appearances and goals

Patrik Hansson (born 23 September 1969) is a Swedish former professional footballer who played as a midfielder.

== Club career ==
Hailing from Växjö, Hansson started his career for the local club Östers IF, and played for the team in Allsvenskan. Hansson transferred to SK Brann in 1992, where his father Jan Hansson was assistant coach, and played 20 matches and scored three goals for Brann in Tippeligaen.

Hansson later played for Sogndal and Jonsereds IF, before he retired in 1996 due to a knee-injury.

== International career ==
Hansson played seven games and scored three goals for the Sweden U19 team between 1986 and 1988.

== Post-playing career ==
Like his father, Hansson has worked as assistant coach of Brann, but decided to resign from his position after the 2012 season. He has also been assistant coach at Kalmar FF and Hammarby IF after his playing career.

Ahead of the 2017 season, he took over Fana IL. He moved on to Toppserien team IL Sandviken ahead of the 2019 season. He was sacked in July 2020.

== Personal life ==
Hansson is the father of the professional footballer Emil Hansson who plays for Birmingham City.
