= 2017–18 Feyenoord season =

Feyenoord
2017–18 season
- Chairman: Gerard Hoetmer
- Manager: Giovanni van Bronckhorst
- Stadium: De Kuip
- Eredivisie: 4th
- KNVB Cup: Winners
- Johan Cruyff Shield: Winners
- Champions League: Group stage
- Top goalscorer: League: Steven Berghuis (18); All: Steven Berghuis (23)
- Highest home attendance: 47,500 (sell-out, vs. multiple opponents)
- Lowest home attendance: 23,500 (vs. AVV Swift, KNVB Cup)
- Average home league attendance: Eredivisie: 45,588; KNVB Cup: 37,940; Champions League: 41,167
Home colours	Away colours	Third colours

The 2017–18 season was Feyenoord's 110th season of play, it marked its 62nd season in the Eredivisie and its 96th consecutive season in the top flight of Dutch football. It was the third season with manager Giovanni van Bronckhorst, a former player who played seven seasons for Feyenoord and who played 106 times for Dutch national team. Feyenoord entered the KNVB Cup in the first round and the Champions League in the group stage.

== Eredivisie ==
=== League table ===
Pos	Team	Pld	W	D	L	GF	GA	GD	Pts	Qualification or relegation
2	Ajax	34	25	4	5	89	33	+56	79	Qualification to Champions League second qualifying round
3	AZ	34	22	5	7	72	38	+34	71	Qualification to Europa League second qualifying round
4	Feyenoord	34	20	6	8	76	39	+37	66	Qualification to Europa League third qualifying round (Note: Feyenoord qualified for the Europa League third qualifying round by winning the 2017–18 KNVB Cup.)
5	Utrecht	34	14	12	8	58	53	+5	54	Qualification to European competition play-offs (Note: Four teams play for a spot in the 2018–19 UEFA Europa League second qualifying round.)
6	Vitesse (O)	34	13	10	11	63	47	+16	49	Qualification to European competition play-offs

Source: eredivisie.nl
Rules for classification: 1) Points; 2) Goal difference; 3) Goals scored; 4) Head-to-head points; 5) Head-to-head goal difference; 6) Head-to-head away goals scored; 7) Play-off if relevant for deciding champion, relegation or participating in a European league, otherwise by draw. 8) Penalty shoot-out (only after a play-off)
(O) Play-off winners

==== Results summary ====
Overall								Home						Away					
Pld	W	D	L	GF	GA	GD	Pts	W	D	L	GF	GA	GD	W	D	L	GF	GA	GD
34	20	6	8	76	39	+37	66	11	3	3	37	17	+20	9	3	5	39	22	+17

Last updated: 1 July 2017.
Source: Eredivisie

==== Results by matchday ====
Matchday	1	2	3	4	5	6	7	8	9	10	11	12	13	14	15	16	17	18	19	20	21	22	23	24	25	26	27	28	29	30	31	32	33	34
Ground	H	A	H	A	A	H	A	H	H	A	A	H	A	H	A	H	A	H	A	H	A	H	A	H	H	A	H	A	H	A	H	A	H	A
Result	W	W	W	W	L	L	W	D	L	D	D	D	W	W	D	D	W	W	L	W	L	W	L	W	L	L	W	W	W	W	W	W	W	W
Position	6	5	1	1	1	4	2	3	5	6	6	7	7	5	5	6	5	4	5	4	4	4	4	4	5	5	5	4	4	4	4	4	4	4

Updated to match(es) played on 19 December 2017. Source: Feyenoord
A = Away; H = Home; W = Win; D = Draw; L = Loss

==== Matches ====
Win Draw Loss

The fixtures for the 2017–18 season were announced in June 2017.

13 August 2017 1	Feyenoord	2–1	Twente	Rotterdam
14:30 CET	Jørgensen 23'; Toornstra (yellow card) 56'; Berghuis 61'; Haps (yellow card) 90+4'	report	Kvasina (yellow card) 12'; Thesker (yellow card) 29'; Jensen 37', (yellow card) 53'; Laukart (yellow card) 78'	Stadium: De Kuip; Attendance: 47,500; Referee: Serdar Gözübüyük; Assistant referees: Bas van Dongen; Joost van Zuilen

20 August 2017 2	Excelsior	0–1	Feyenoord	Rotterdam
12:30 CET	Faes (yellow card) 43'	report	Boëtius 18'; Berghuis (yellow card) 44'; Van der Heijden (yellow card) 79'	Stadium: Van Dongen & De Roo Stadion; Attendance: 4,400; Referee: Bjorn Kuipers; Assistant referees: Sander van Roekel; Erwin Zeinstra

27 August 2017 3	Feyenoord	5–0	Willem II	Rotterdam
12:30 CET	Toornstra 13', 20'; Berghuis 16'; Vilhena 39'; Boëtius 80'	report	Chirivella (yellow card) 1'	Stadium: De Kuip; Attendance: 47,500; Referee: Bas Nijhuis; Assistant referees: Richard Poelman; Roy de Nas

9 September 2017 4	Heracles	2–4	Feyenoord	Almelo
18:30 CET	Niemeijer 73', 81'; Peterson (yellow card) 87'; Darri (yellow card) 90'	report	Berghuis 22', 29'; Boëtius 33'; Vilhena (yellow card) 71'; Van der Heijden (yellow card) 90'; Larsson 90+3'	Stadium: Polman Stadion; Attendance: 11,331; Referee: Danny Makkelie; Assistant referees: Mario Diks; Hessel Steegstra

17 September 2017 5	PSV	1–0	Feyenoord	Eindhoven
16:45 CET	Pereiro 2'; Bergwijn (yellow card) 50'; Rosario (yellow card) 87'	report	Berghuis (yellow card) 16' (yellow-red card) 43'; Van der Heijden (yellow card) 23'; Haps (yellow card) 60'; Toornstra (yellow card) 68'	Stadium: Philips Stadion; Attendance: 35,000; Referee: Bjorn Kuipers; Assistant referees: Sander van Roekel; Erwin Zeinstra

23 September 2017 6	Feyenoord	0–2	NAC Breda	Rotterdam
19:45 CET	Michiel Kramer (penalty missed) 74'	report	Korte 33'; Angeliño (yellow card) 45'; Enevoldsen 86'; Sporkslede (yellow card) 90+2'	Stadium: De Kuip; Attendance: 47,500; Referee: Jochem Kamphuis; Assistant referees: Johan Balder; Terry Hoekstra

1 October 2017 7	AZ	0–4	Feyenoord	Alkmaar
12:30 CET		report	Berghuis 11', 41'; Larsson 17'; Vilhena 57'	Stadium: AFAS Stadion; Attendance: 14,000; Referee: Bas Nijhuis; Assistant referees: Patrick Langkamp; Mark Strijker

14 October 2017 8	Feyenoord	0–0	PEC Zwolle	Rotterdam
20:45 CET	Amrabat (yellow card) 17'; Berghuis (yellow card) 90'	report	Ehizibue (yellow card) 22'; Mokhtar (yellow card) 32'; Nijland (yellow card) 41'	Stadium: De Kuip; Attendance: 47,500; Referee: Dennis Higler; Assistant referees: Richard Brondijk; Richard Polman

22 October 2017 9	Feyenoord	1–4	Ajax	Rotterdam
14:30 CET	Jørgensen (yellow card) 24'; Vilhena (yellow card) 26'; Jens Toornstra 58'	report	Huntelaar (yellow card) 20' (goal) 50'; Ziyech (yellow card) 41'; Schöne (yellow card) 60'; Neres (yellow card) 64'; Dolberg 72', 90'; de Jong 89'	Stadium: De Kuip; Attendance: 47,500; Referee: Danny Makkelie; Assistant referees: Mario Diks; Hessel Steegstra

28 October 2017 10	Roda JC	1–1	Feyenoord	Kerkrade
18:30 CET	Schahin 17'; El Makrini (yellow card) 36'	report	Berghuis 11'; Nieuwkoop (yellow card) 81'	Stadium: Parkstad Limburg Stadion; Attendance: 13,491; Referee: Kevin Blom; Assistant referees: Rob van de Ven; Joost van Zuilen

5 November 2017 11	ADO Den Haag	2–2	Feyenoord	’s-Gravenhage
12:30 CET	Meijers 44'; Kanon 55'	report	Jørgensen 4' (yellow card) 90'; El Ahmadi 86'	Stadium: Cars Jeans Stadion; Attendance: 13,870; Referee: Bas Nijhuis; Assistant referees: Rogier Honig; Roy de Nas

18 November 2017 12	Feyenoord	1–1	VVV-Venlo	Rotterdam
18:30 CET	Jørgensen 54'	report	Janssen (yellow card) 52'; van Bruggen 86'; Unnerstall (yellow card) 90'	Stadium: De Kuip; Attendance: 47,500; Referee: Dennis Higler; Assistant referees: Richard Brondijk; Johan Balder

25 November 2017 13	FC Groningen	0–2	Feyenoord	Groningen
19:45 CET		report	Vilhena 49'; Jørgensen 59'	Stadium: Euroborg; Attendance: 20,294; Referee: Danny Makkelie; Assistant referees: Mario Diks; Hessel Steegstra

2 December 2017 14	Feyenoord	1–0	Vitesse	Rotterdam
20:45 CET	Jørgensen 9'; Amrabat (yellow card) 74'	report	Miazga (yellow card) 53'	Stadium: De Kuip; Attendance: 47,500; Referee: Pol van Boekel; Assistant referees: Jan de Vries; Charl Schaap

24 January 2018 15	FC Utrecht	1–1	Feyenoord	Utrecht
20:00 CET	Kerk 41'	report	Malacia (yellow card) 16'; Larsson 23'; St. Juste (yellow card) 45'	Stadium: Stadion Galgenwaard; Attendance: 22,111; Referee: Kevin Blom; Assistant referees: Jan de Vries; Joost van Zuilen

13 December 2017 16	Feyenoord	1–1	SC Heerenveen	Rotterdam
20:45 CET	Berghuis 41'	report	Veerman 43'; Schmidt (yellow card) 44'; Thorsby (yellow card) 74'	Stadium: De Kuip; Attendance: 40,000; Referee: Kevin Blom; Assistant referees: Rob van de Ven; Richard Polman

17 December 2017 17	Sparta	0–7	Feyenoord	Rotterdam
12:30 CET	Fischer (yellow card) 21'; Proschwitz (yellow card) 35'; Dougall (yellow card) 76'	report	Vilhena 4', 28'; Vente 8'; St. Juste 15'; Tapia 48'; van Beek (yellow card) 55'; Berghuis 71'; Başaçıkoğlu 88'	Stadium: Het Kasteel; Attendance: 10,400; Referee: Serdar Gözübüyük; Assistant referees: Dave Goossens; Bas van Dongen

24 December 2017 18	Feyenoord	5–1	Roda JC	Rotterdam
16:45 CET	Jørgensen 1', 56'; Toornstra 4'; Berghuis 89', 90'	report	Gustafson 50'; Werker (yellow card) 83'	Stadium: De Kuip; Attendance: 40,000; Referee: Jochem Kamphuis; Assistant referees: Charl Schaap; Rens Bluemink

21 January 2018 19	Ajax	2-0	Feyenoord	Amsterdam
14:30 CET	Kluivert (yellow card) 23'; Van de Beek 50'; Huntelaar 53'	report	St. Juste (yellow card) 22'; van Beek (yellow card) 38'; Jørgensen (yellow card) 36' (yellow-red card) 89'	Stadium: Amsterdam Arena; Attendance: 53,320; Referee: Björn Kuipers; Assistant referees: Sander van Roekel; Erwin Zeinstra

28 January 2018 20	Feyenoord	3–1	ADO Den Haag	Rotterdam
14:30 CET	Vilhena 54'; Berghuis 68'; Toornstra 80'	report	Meijers (yellow card) 40'; Immers 71'	Stadium: De Kuip; Attendance: 47,500; Referee: Bas Nijhuis; Assistant referees: Rob van de Ven; Patrick Langkamp

4 February 2018 21	VVV-Venlo	1-0	Feyenoord	Venlo
14:30 CET	Post (yellow card) 57'; Leemans 88' (pen.)	report	Berghuis (yellow card) 22'; El Ahmadi (yellow card) 40'; Vilhena (yellow card) 57'; Tapia (yellow card) 87'	Stadium: De Koel; Attendance: 8,000; Referee: Jochem Kamphuis; Assistant referees: Angelo Boonman; Nicky Siebert

8 February 2018 22	Feyenoord	3–0	FC Groningen	Rotterdam
20:45 CET	Toornstra 53'; St. Juste 72'; van Persie 78'	report		Stadium: De Kuip; Attendance: 37,500; Referee: Serdar Gözübüyük; Assistant referees: Rogier Honig; Richard Polman

11 February 2018 23	Vitesse	3-1	Feyenoord	Arnhem
14:30 CET	Bruns (yellow card) 13'; Kashia 43'; Linssen 66', 86'; Buitink (yellow card) 84'	report	Vilhena 21'; Başaçıkoğlu (red card) 65'; Malacia (red card) 81'	Stadium: GelreDome; Attendance: 16,459; Referee: Dennis Higler; Assistant referees: Charl Schaap; Erik Kleinjan

18 February 2018 24	Feyenoord	1–0	Heracles	Rotterdam
14:30 CET	Diks (yellow card) 22'; Nieuwkoop (yellow card) 50'; van Persie 59'	report	Baas (yellow card) 17'	Stadium: De Kuip; Attendance: 47,500; Referee: Ed Janssen; Assistant referees: Terry Hoekstra; Mark Strijker

25 February 2018 25	Feyenoord	1–3	PSV	Rotterdam
14:30 CET	Amrabat (yellow card) 32'; van der Heijden (yellow card) 50'; Vilhena 53'; Botteghin (yellow card) 55'; El Ahmadi (yellow card) 73'	report	Arias 23'; Bergwijn 34'; Pereiro 58'	Stadium: De Kuip; Attendance: 47,500; Referee: Danny Makkelie; Assistant referees: Mario Diks; Hessel Steegstra

3 March 2018 26	NAC	2-1	Feyenoord	Breda
20:45 CET	Ambrose 23'; Marí (yellow card) 36'; Sadiq 49' (pen.); Verschueren (yellow card) 60'; Sporkslede (yellow card) 90'	report	Toornstra 17'; Botteghin (yellow card) 29'; Jones (yellow card) 48'	Stadium: Rat Verlegh Stadion; Attendance: 18,963; Referee: Bas Nijhuis; Assistant referees: Rob van de Ven; Joost van Zuilen

11 March 2018 27	Feyenoord	2–1	AZ	Rotterdam
16:45 CET	Toornstra (yellow card) 19'; Boëtius 33'; van der Heijden (yellow card) 61'; Jørgensen 73'	report	Jahanbakhsh (yellow card) 23'; Idrissi (yellow card) 26'; Weghorst 90'	Stadium: De Kuip; Attendance: 45,000; Referee: Dennis Higler; Assistant referees: Charl Schaap; Richard Brondijk

18 March 2018 28	PEC Zwolle	3-4	Feyenoord	Zwolle
16:45 CET	Saymak 52'; Parzyszek 85' (pen.), 88'	report	van Persie 10', 15'; El Ahmadi 51'; Vilhena 78'	Stadium: MAC³PARK Stadion; Attendance: 13,250; Referee: Pol van Boekel; Assistant referees: Dave Goossens; Patrick Langkamp

1 April 2018 29	Feyenoord	5–0	Excelsior	Rotterdam
16:45 CET	Boëtius 4'; Toornstra 27'; Vilhena 42'; Berghuis 55'; de Wijs 76' (own goal)	report	Faes (yellow card) 35'; Mattheij (yellow card) 78'	Stadium: De Kuip; Attendance: 45,000; Referee: Serdar Gözübüyük; Assistant referees: Rogier Honig; Rens Bluemink

8 April 2018 30	FC Twente	1-3	Feyenoord	Enschede
14:30 CET	Boere (yellow card) 1'; Maher 22'	report	Boëtius 18'; Berghuis (yellow card) 25' (goal) 67'; van der Heijden (yellow card) 43'; Jørgensen 75'	Stadium: De Grolsch Veste; Attendance: 25,600; Referee: Danny Makkelie; Assistant referees: Mario Diks; Hessel Steegstra

15 April 2018 31	Feyenoord	3–1	FC Utrecht	Rotterdam
14:30 CET	Jørgensen 7'; van Persie 43'; Larsson 69'	report	Dessers 31'; Labyad (yellow card) 34'; Ayoub (yellow card) 44'	Stadium: De Kuip; Attendance: 47,500; Referee: Bas Nijhuis; Assistant referees: Terry Hoekstra; Erik Kleinjan

18 April 2018 32	Willem II	1-5	Feyenoord	Tilburg
20:45 CET	Haye (yellow card) 42'; Ogbeche (yellow card) 71' (goal) 75'; Croux (yellow card) 72'	report	Amrabat (yellow card) 24' (goal) 51'; Vente 28', 86'; Vilhena 57'; Başaçıkoğlu 90'	Stadium: Koning Willem II Stadion; Attendance: 13,320; Referee: Kevin Blom; Assistant referees: Jan de Vries; Cristian Dobre

29 April 2018 33	Feyenoord	3–1	Sparta	Rotterdam
14:30 CET	Berghuis 45', 83'; Holst 65' (Own goal)	report	Friday 34'	Stadium: De Kuip; Attendance: 45,000; Referee: Dennis Higler; Assistant referees: Patrick Langkamp; Nicky Siebert

6 May 2018 34	SC Heerenveen	2-3	Feyenoord	Heerenveen
14:30 CET	Ghoochannejhad (yellow card) 14'; Bulthuis (yellow card) 37'; Bruijn 79'; van der Heijden 80' (Own goal)	report	Steven Berghuis 10', 41'; van der Heijden (yellow card) 21'; Haps (yellow card) 82'; Başaçıkoğlu 90'	Stadium: Abe Lenstra Stadion; Attendance: 24,640; Referee: Danny Makkelie; Assistant referees: Mario Diks; Hessel Steegstra

== KNVB Cup ==
20 September 2017 1st Round	Feyenoord	2–0	ADO Den Haag	Rotterdam
20:45 CET	Botteghin (yellow card) 34'; Berghuis 73', (yellow card) 75'; Kramer 83' (pen.)	report	Gorter (yellow card) 29' (yellow-red card) 82'; Hooi (yellow card) 53'; Beugelsdijk (yellow card) 59'; Kanon (yellow card) 79'	Stadium: Feijenoord Stadion; Attendance: 44,700; Referee: Pol van Boekel; Assistant referees: Rob van de Ven; Bas van Dongen; Fourth official: M. van den Kerkhof

25 October 2017 2nd Round	Feyenoord	4–1	AVV Swift	Rotterdam
20:45 CET	Larsson 8', 45', 87'; Kramer 66'	report	Gabel (red card) 12'; Van Wakeren 50'; Van Zweeden (yellow card) 62'; Moelee (yellow card) 72'	Stadium: Feijenoord Stadion; Attendance: 23,500; Referee: Serdar Gözübüyük; Assistant referees: D. Goossens; Bas van Dongen; Fourth official: J. Kooij

21 December 2017 Round of 16	Feyenoord	3–1	Heracles	Rotterdam
20:45 CET	Berguis 7', 86' (pen.); Van Beek 16'; El Ahmadi (yellow card) 60'	report	Breukers 23'	Stadium: Feijenoord Stadion; Attendance: 30,000; Referee: Bas Nijhuis; Assistant referees: E. Kleinjan; C. Dobre; Fourth official: R. Dieperink

31 January 2018 Quarter-finals	Feyenoord	2–0	PSV	Rotterdam
20:45 CET	Larsson 3'; Toornstra (yellow card) 7'; Malacia (yellow card) 29'; Vilhena 35'; Van Beek (yellow card) 70'	report	De Jong (yellow card) 4'; Hendrix (yellow card) 76'; Van Ginkel (yellow card) 89'	Stadium: Feijenoord Stadion; Attendance: 47,500; Referee: Pol van Boekel; Assistant referees: D. Goossens; J. Balder; Fourth official: A. Lindhout

28 February 2018 Semi-Finals	Feyenoord	3–0	Willem II	Rotterdam
20:45 CET	Berghuis 20'; Van Persie 60'; Vilhena 84'	report		Stadium: Feijenoord Stadion; Attendance: 44,000; Referee: Kevin Blom; Assistant referees: J. Balder; J. de Vries; Fourth official: C. Bax

22 April 2018 Final	AZ	0–3	Feyenoord	Rotterdam
18:00 CET	Midtsjø (yellow card) 37'; Jahanbakhsh (yellow card) 43'; Weghorst (yellow card) 43'; Koopmeiners (yellow card) 46'	report	Jørgensen 28'; El Ahmadi (yellow card) 49'; Van Persie 57'; Diks (yellow card) 69'; Boëtius (yellow card) 77'; Toornstra 90+3'	Stadium: Feijenoord Stadion; Attendance: 46,084; Referee: Björn Kuipers; Assistant referees: Van Roekel; Zeinstra; Fourth official: Pol van Boekel

== Johan Cruyff Shield ==
5 August 2017 Final	Feyenoord	1–1 (4–2 p)	Vitesse	Rotterdam
18:00 CET	Toornstra 7'; Diks (yellow card) 38'; El Ahmadi (yellow card) 57'	report	Linssen (yellow card) 29'; Büttner 58' (pen.); Bruns (yellow card) 71'	Stadium: Stadion Feyenoord; Attendance: 47,500; Referee: Danny Makkelie; Assistant referees: Mario Diks; Hessel Steegstra; Fourth official: Jochem Kamphuis
	Penalties
	Van der Heijden (penalty scored); Boëtius (penalty scored); Toornstra (penalty scored); Jørgensen (penalty scored)		Matavž (penalty missed); Rashica (penalty missed); Foor (penalty scored); Colkett (penalty scored)

== Champions League ==
=== Group stage ===
Win Draw Loss

13 September 2017 1	Feyenoord	0–4	(England) Manchester City	Rotterdam, Netherlands
20:45 CET	St. Juste (yellow card) 38'; Kramer (yellow card) 40'; Vilhena (yellow card) 41'; Botteghin (yellow card) 66'	report	Stones 2', 63'; Agüero 10'; De Bruyne (yellow card) 15'; Jesus 25'	Stadium: Feijenoord Stadion; Attendance: 43,500; Referee: Szymon Marciniak (Poland)

26 September 2017 2	Napoli (Italy)	3–1	Feyenoord	Naples, Italy
20:45 CET	Insigne 7'; Koulibaly (yellow card) 37'; Mertens 49'; Callejon 70'; Diawara (yellow card) 90+1'	report	El Ahmadi (yellow card) 47'; Berghuis (yellow card) 54'; Toornstra (penalty missed) 68'; Van Beek (yellow card) 86'; Amrabat 90+3'	Stadium: Stadio San Paolo; Attendance: 22,577; Referee: Willie Collum (Scotland)

17 October 2017 3	Feyenoord	1–2	(Ukraine) Shakhtar Donetsk	Rotterdam, Netherlands
20:45 CET	Berghuis 8'; El Ahmadi (yellow card) 66'; Amrabat (yellow card) 87'	Report	Bernard 24', 54'; Rakitskiy (yellow card) 48' (yellow-red card) 75'; Taison (yellow card) 64'; Kovalenko (yellow card) 77'; Butko (yellow card) 90+3'	Stadium: De Kuip; Attendance: 43,500; Referee: Alberto Undiano Mallenco (Spain)

1 November 2017 4	Shakhtar Donetsk (Ukraine)	3–1	Feyenoord	Kharkiv, Ukraine
20:45 CET	Ferreyra 14'; Marlos 17', 68'; Khocholava (yellow card) 36'	Report	Jørgensen 12'; Berghuis (yellow card) 49'; El Ahmadi (yellow card) 54'	Stadium: Metalist Stadium; Attendance: 24,570; Referee: Anastasios Sidiropoulos (Greece)

21 November 2017 5	Manchester City (England)	1–0	Feyenoord	Manchester, England
20:45 CET	Mangala (yellow card) 59'; De Bruyne (yellow card) 60'; Danilo (yellow card) 86'; Sterling 88'	Report	Vilhena (yellow card) 56'; Jones (yellow card) 74'; Toornstra (yellow card) 79'	Stadium: City of Manchester Stadium; Attendance: 43,548; Referee: Ivan Kružliak (Slovakia)

6 December 2017 6	Feyenoord	2–1	(Italy) Napoli	Rotterdam, Netherlands
20:45 CET	Vilhena (yellow card) 28' (yellow-red card) 83'; Jørgensen 33'; St. Juste (yellow card) 81', (goal) 90+1'	Report	Zieliński 2'; Mertens (yellow card) 79'	Stadium: De Kuip; Attendance: 36,500; Referee: Michael Oliver (England)

== Player details ==
As of 4 October 2017

Appearances (Apps.) numbers are for appearances in competitive games only including sub appearances
Red card numbers denote: Numbers in parentheses represent red cards overturned for wrongful dismissal.

No.	Nat.	Player	Pos.	Eredivisie				KNVB Cup				Super Cup				Champions League				Total			
No.	Nat.	Player	Pos.	Apps	Goal	Yellow card	Red card	Apps	Goal	Yellow card	Red card	Apps	Goal	Yellow card	Red card	Apps	Goal	Yellow card	Red card	Apps	Goal	Yellow card	Red card
1	(Netherlands)	Kenneth Vermeer	GK					1								1				2			
2	(Netherlands)	Bart Nieuwkoop	DF	14		2		3								4				21		2	
3	(Netherlands)	Sven van Beek	DF	20		2		4	1	1						4		1		28	1	4	
4	(Netherlands)	Jerry St. Juste	DF	15	2	2		3								5	1	2		28	3	4	
5	(Netherlands)	Ridgeciano Haps	DF	23		3		4				1				4				32		3	
6	(Netherlands)	Jan-Arie van der Heijden	DF	18		7		3				1				1				23		7	
7	(Netherlands)	Jean-Paul Boëtius	FW	28	6			3		1		1				6				38	6	1	
8	(Morocco)	Karim El Ahmadi	MF	31	2	2		5		2		1		1		4		3		41	2	8	
9	(Denmark)	Nicolai Jørgensen	FW	26	10	2	1	3	1			1				4	2			34	13	2	1
10	(Netherlands)	Tonny Vilhena	MF	33	11	3		4	2			1				6		2	1	44	13	5	1
11	(Sweden)	Sam Larsson	FW	19	4			4	4							6				29	8		
14	(Turkey)	Bilal Başaçıkoğlu	FW	13	3		1	2				1				2				18	3		1
17	(Netherlands)	Kevin Diks	DF	23		1		4		1		1		1		3				31		3	
18	(Netherlands)	Miquel Nelom	DF	6				1								1				8			
19	(Netherlands)	Steven Berghuis	FW	31	18	5	1	5	4	1		1				6	1	2		43	23	8	1
20	(Peru)	Renato Tapia	DF	15	1	1		3								4				22	1	1	
21	(Morocco)	Sofyan Amrabat	MF	21	1	4		3				1				6	1	1		31	2	5	
22	(Netherlands)	Justin Bijlow	GK	3																3			
25	(Australia)	Brad Jones	GK	31		1		5				1				5		1		42		2	
28	(Netherlands)	Jens Toornstra	MF	32	8	3		6	1	1		1	1			5		1		44	10	5	
29	(Netherlands)	Michiel Kramer	FW	8				2	2							2		1		12	2	1	
30	(Netherlands)	Ramon ten Hove	GK																				
32	(Netherlands)	Robin van Persie	FW	12	5			2	2											14	7		
33	(Brazil)	Eric Botteghin	DF	12		2		3		1		1				1		1		17		4	
34	(Netherlands)	Dylan Vente	FW	9	3			2								1				12	3		
35	(Netherlands)	Tyrell Malacia	DF	11		1	1	2		1						1				14		2	1
36	(Norway)	Emil Hansson	MF	1				1												2			
39	(Netherlands)	Cheikh Touré	FW	1																1			
41	(Netherlands)	Lutsharel Geertruida	DF					1												1			
Own goals					2				0				0				0				0		
Totals					76	41	4		17	9	0		1	2	0		5	15	1		99	67	5

Source: (for players and positions) Feyenoord 1st team squad (for squad numbers) Squad Profiles (for actual stats.)

== Transfers ==
In: Note: Flags indicate national team as defined under FIFA eligibility rules; some limited exceptions apply. Players may hold more than one non-FIFA nationality.

No.	Pos.	Nation	Player
—	MF	MAR	Sofyan Amrabat (from (Netherlands) Utrecht)
—	FW	NED	Steven Berghuis (from (England) Watford)
—	FW	NED	Jean-Paul Boëtius (from (Switzerland) Basel)
—	DF	NED	Ridgeciano Haps (from (Netherlands) AZ)
—	FW	SWE	Sam Larsson (from (Netherlands) Heerenveen)
—	DF	NED	Jerry St. Juste (from (Netherlands) Heerenveen)
—	DF	NED	Kevin Diks (on loan from (Italy) Fiorentina)

Out: Note: Flags indicate national team as defined under FIFA eligibility rules; some limited exceptions apply. Players may hold more than one non-FIFA nationality.

No.	Pos.	Nation	Player
—	DF	NED	Wessel Dammers (to (Netherlands) Fortuna Sittard)
—	FW	NED	Eljero Elia (to (Turkey) Medipol Başakşehir)
—	GK	NED	Warner Hahn (to (Netherlands) Heerenveen)
—	GK	SWE	Par Hansson (to (Sweden) Helsingborgs IF)
—	DF	NED	Rick Karsdorp (to (Italy) Roma)
—	DF	NED	Terence Kongolo (to (France) Monaco)
—	DF	NED	Lucas Woudenberg (to (Netherlands) Heerenveen)
—	FW	NED	Mohamed El Hankouri (on loan to (Netherlands) Willem II)
—	MF	SWE	Simon Gustafson (on loan to (Netherlands) Roda JC)
—	MF	NED	Gustavo Hamer (on loan to (Netherlands) Dordrecht)
—	MF	NED	Jari Schuurman (on loan to (Netherlands) NEC)
—	MF	NED	Marko Vejinović (on loan to (Netherlands) AZ)
—	DF	NED	Calvin Verdonk (on loan to (Netherlands) NEC)
—	FW	NED	Dirk Kuyt (Retired)
