= Lennerd Daneels =

Belgian footballer (born 1998)

Personal information
- Full name: Lennerd Daneels
- Date of birth: 10 April 1998 (age 28)
- Place of birth: Gierle, Belgium
- Height: 1.72 m (5 ft 8 in)
- Positions: Winger; forward

Team information
- Current team: MVV Maastricht
- Number: 7

Youth career
- –2010: Germinal Beerchot
- 2010–2017: PSV

Senior career*
Years	Team	Apps	(Gls)
2017–2019	Jong PSV	40	(5)
2019–2022	RKC	63	(2)
2022–2024	Roda JC	67	(7)
2024–2026	Helmond Sport	69	(9)
2026–	MVV Maastricht	9	(0)

International career
2013	Belgium U15	3	(0)
2013–2015	Belgium U17	24	(5)
2016–2017	Belgium U19	7	(1)
Medal record
Representing Belgium
FIFA U-17 World Cup
Third place	Chile 2015	U-17 Team
- * Club domestic league appearances and goals as of 3 October 2026

Lennerd Daneels (born 10 April 1998) is a Belgian professional footballer who plays as a winger for Eerste Divisie club MVV Maastricht.

== Club career ==
=== Early career ===
Daneels played in the youth department of Germinal Beerchot until he was scouted to the academy of PSV in 2010. There, he progressed through the various youth teams. He made his Eerste Divisie debut for Jong PSV on 25 August 2017 in a 2–1 win against Helmond Sport as an 80th-minute substitute for Joey Konings. On 30 March 2018, he scored his first goal in a 3–0 away victory against Jong Ajax.

=== RKC ===
On 31 May 2019, Daneels left PSV as a free agent and joined RKC Waalwijk on a two-year contract for the upcoming 2019–20 season. He made his debut for the club on 3 August in a 3–1 away loss to VVV-Venlo. He came on in the 85th minute of the game to replace Anas Tahiri.

On 28 October 2020, Daneels scored his first goal for the club in a KNVB Cup game against Cambuur.

=== Roda JC ===
On 30 August 2022, Daneels signed a two-year contract with Roda JC Kerkrade. He made his Roda debut on 4 September 2022 in a Limburg derby against MVV, replacing Teun Bijleveld in the 62nd minute of a 1–1 draw.

Daneels scored his first goal for the club on the first matchday of the 2023–24 season, securing a 4–1 home win in the 89th minute over Helmond Sport on 11 August. On 24 March 2024, it was announced that Roda could not trigger the one-year option in Daneels' contract due to financial reasons, effectively making him a free agent at the end of the season.

=== Helmond Sport ===
On 27 June 2024, Daneels signed a two-year contract with Eerste Divisie club Helmond Sport. He made his debut in the opening fixture of the season, starting in a 1–1 home draw against Jong Utrecht.

=== MVV Maastricht ===
In the summer of 2026, Daneels moved to MVV Maastricht in the same league for two seasons, with an optional third season.

== Career statistics ==
As of match played 9 August 2024

Appearances and goals by club, season and competition
Club	Season	League			National cup		Europe		Other		Total	
Club	Season	Division	Apps	Goals	Apps	Goals	Apps	Goals	Apps	Goals	Apps	Goals
Jong PSV	2017–18	Eerste Divisie	12	1	—		—		—		12	1
Jong PSV	2018–19	Eerste Divisie	28	4	—		—		—		28	4
Jong PSV	Total		40	5	—		—		—		40	5
RKC	2019–20	Eredivisie	7	0	0	0	—		—		7	0
RKC	2020–21	Eredivisie	33	2	1	1	—		—		34	3
RKC	2021–22	Eredivisie	20	0	4	0	—		—		24	0
RKC	2022–23	Eredivisie	3	0	0	0	—		—		3	0
RKC	Total		63	2	5	1	—		—		68	3
Roda JC	2022–23	Eerste Divisie	30	0	1	0	—		—		31	0
Roda JC	2023–24	Eerste Divisie	37	7	1	0	—		2 (Note: Appearances in Eredivisie promotion/relegation playoffs)	0	40	7
Roda JC	Total		67	7	2	0	—		2	0	71	7
Helmond Sport	2024–25	Eerste Divisie	1	0	0	0	—		—		1	0
Career total			171	14	7	1	0	0	2	0	180	15

== Honours ==
Belgium U17

- FIFA U-17 World Cup third place: 2015
