= Thomas Kok =

Dutch footballer (born 1998)

Personal information
- Full name: Thomas Petrus Johannes Kok
- Date of birth: 15 May 1998 (age 28)
- Place of birth: Tilburg, Netherlands
- Height: 1.79 m (5 ft 10 in)
- Position: Midfielder

Team information
- Current team: De Graafschap
- Number: 15

Youth career
- 2004–2011: SC 't Zand
- 2011–2013: Antwerp
- 2013–2016: Willem II

Senior career*
Years	Team	Apps	(Gls)
2016–2018	Willem II	1	(0)
2018	→ Dordrecht (loan)	22	(0)
2018–2020	Dordrecht	64	(1)
2020–2021	Jerv	30	(0)
2022–2025	Preußen Münster	58	(0)
2024	Preußen Münster II	2	(0)
2025	Sportfreunde Lotte	15	(0)
2025–	De Graafschap	27	(0)
- * Club domestic league appearances and goals as of 28 April 2026

Thomas Petrus Johannes Kok (born 15 May 1998) is a Dutch professional footballer who plays as a midfielder for Eerste Divisie club De Graafschap. Besides the Netherlands, he has played in Norway and Germany.

== Career ==
Born in Tilburg, Netherlands, Kok started playing football in the youth teams of SC 't Zand, Antwerp, and Willem II. He made his professional debut for Willem II on 14 May 2017, in a 3–1 home loss against Ajax, starting at left-back due to several injuries in the team. In January 2018, he was sent on a six-month loan to Dordrecht for six months, and later the move became permanent.

In September 2020, he joined Norwegian second tier club Jerv, but a broken arm kept him out for most of the season. However, he became a key player for Jerv in the following season, reaching promotion to Eliteserien with the club. His contract expired after his second season at the club.

In January 2022, Kok signed with German Regionalliga West club Preußen Münster, helping the team secure promotion to the 3. Liga in 2023.

On 28 January 2025, Kok moved to Sportfreunde Lotte. After six months, he returned to the Netherlands, where he signed with De Graafschap.

== Honours ==
Preußen Münster

- Regionalliga West: 2022–23
