= Junior van der Velden =

Dutch footballer (born 1998)

Personal information
- Date of birth: 14 August 1998 (age 28)
- Place of birth: Utrecht, Netherlands
- Height: 1.86 m (6 ft 1 in)
- Position: Centre-back

Team information
- Current team: DOVO
- Number: 3

Youth career
- –2012: Sporting '70
- 2012–2016: Utrecht

Senior career*
Years	Team	Apps	(Gls)
2016–2020	Jong Utrecht	69	(3)
2020–2021	Den Bosch	30	(3)
2021–2022	Viterbese	16	(0)
2022	Arezzo	14	(2)
2022–2023	Sporting '70		
2023–2026	IJsselmeervogels	101	(10)
2026–	DOVO	6	(0)
- * Club domestic league appearances and goals as of 09:44, 25 September 2026 (UTC)

Junior van der Velden (born 14 August 1998) is a Dutch footballer who plays as a centre back for Derde Divisie club DOVO.

== Club career ==
He made his professional debut in the Eerste Divisie for Jong FC Utrecht on 5 August 2016 in a game against NAC Breda.

On 20 August 2021, he signed a two-year contract with Italian Serie C club Viterbese. On 7 January 2022, his contract with Viterbese was terminated by mutual consent. On the same day, he joined Arezzo in "serie D", the fourth division of Italian leagues.

In February 2026, it was announced that Van der Velden would join Derde Divisie club DOVO from the 2026–27 season.
