= Guus Joppen =

Dutch footballer (born 1989)

Personal information
- Date of birth: 14 November 1989 (age 37)
- Place of birth: Eindhoven, Netherlands
- Height: 1.80 m (5 ft 11 in)
- Positions: Right-back; centre-back

Team information
- Current team: De Treffers
- Number: 4

Youth career
- 1994–2000: UNA
- 2000–2006: PSV
- 2006–2007: Helmond Sport

Senior career*
Years	Team	Apps	(Gls)
2007–2012	Helmond Sport	162	(12)
2012–2015	VVV-Venlo	100	(4)
2015–2017	Willem II	26	(1)
2017–2019	NEC	46	(4)
2019–2021	Helmond Sport	51	(1)
2021–2023	Roda JC	67	(4)
2023–	De Treffers	63	(4)

International career
2008	Netherlands U19	1	(0)
- * Club domestic league appearances and goals as of 07:05, 28 May 2025 (UTC)

Guus Joppen (born 14 November 1989) is a Dutch professional footballer who plays as a centre-back for Tweede Divisie club De Treffers. He formerly played for VVV-Venlo, Willem II, NEC, Helmond Sport and Roda JC.

== Club career ==
=== Helmond Sport ===
Joppen was born in Eindhoven, and played youth football for UNA before joining the PSV Eindhoven academy in 2000.

In 2006, Joppen moved to the Helmond Sport youth academy, and made his professional debut on 19 October 2007 in a 1–1 Eerste Divisie draw against Cambuur. He came on as a substitute, replacing Sidney Lammens at half-time. On 7 November, he signed his first contract with the club; a one-and-a-half-year deal. Two days later, he scored his first professional goal, opening the score in a 2–1 league win over FC Omniworld.

Joppen played five seasons for Helmond, making 180 total appearances in which he managed to score 13 goals.

=== VVV-Venlo ===
On 9 April 2012, it was announced that Joppen had signed a three-year contract with Eredivisie club VVV-Venlo starting from 1 July 2012. He made his official debut for the club on the first matchday of the 2012–13 season, starting in a 1–1 away draw against Heracles Almelo. On 21 August, he scored his first goal for VVV, giving the club a 2–0 lead in the 21st minute of an eventual 3–2 home loss to Feyenoord. Joppen made 36 total appearances for the club that season, scoring once, as VVV suffered relegation through play-offs to Go Ahead Eagles after losing in both legs.

In the following season, as VVV returned to the second tier, Joppen was appointed team captain.

Joppen departed VVV after the 2014–15 Eerste Divisie season, having made 113 total appearances for the club in which he scored four goals.

=== Willem II ===
Joppen joined Eredivisie club Willem II on a free on 18 June 2015, signing a two-year contract. He made his debut for the club on the first matchday of the season, replacing Frank van der Struijk in the 88th minute of a 1–1 home draw against Vitesse. On 6 December he scored his first goal for the Tricolores, heading home a free-kick from Lucas Andersen to open the score in the 11th minute of a 3–0 home victory over Cambuur.

Joppen played more sparingly than before during his two seasons at Willem II, making 32 total appearances of which 24 as a starter, and scoring once.

=== NEC ===
On 30 June 2017, Joppen signed with NEC, who had just suffered relegation to the Eerste Divisie. He made his debut for the club as a starter on the first matchday in a match against Almere City, but fell out with a muscle injury in the ninth minute of play and was replaced by Michael Heinloth. He made his return to the pitch on 15 September, starting in a 1–1 home draw against FC Emmen. On 25 September, Joppen scored his first goal for NEC in a 3–3 draw against Jong PSV.

At the end of the 2018–19 season, Joppen left NEC as a free agent after 51 appearances for the club in which he scored five goals.

=== Return to Helmond Sport ===
On 25 June 2019, Helmond Sport announced the return of Joppen, who had agreed to a two-year contract. He made his return debut for the club on 9 August, marking the occasion with being sent off after his second booking in a 1–1 draw against FC Volendam.

Joppen made 52 total appearances for Helmond Sport after returning, scoring no goals, before leaving as his contract expired in June 2021.

=== Roda JC ===
On 25 June 2021, Joppen signed a two-year contract with Eerste Divisie club Roda JC. He immediately established himself as a starter in defense for de Koempels, making his debut for the club on matchday one of the 2021–22 Eerste Divisie season in a 3–0 away victory against De Graafschap at De Vijverberg. He made 36 league starts during his first season at the club, scoring twice, as Roda finished fifth in the league table and were subsequently knocked out in the first round of play-offs for promotion against Excelsior, who would later eventually return to the Eredivisie.

Joppen left Roda at the end of the 2022–23 season, as his contract was not extended. He made 71 competitive appearances for the club, scoring four goals.

=== De Treffers ===
On 1 August 2023, Joppen signed a one-year deal with Tweede Divisie club De Treffers.

== International career ==
Joppen is a Netherlands youth international, having gained one cap for the national under-19 team: on 6 February 2008, he came on at half-time for Norichio Nieveld in a 2–1 away friendly win over Scotland at Broadwood Stadium.

== Throw-ins ==
Joppen is renowned for his long throw ins. In April 2008, this caused him to have thrombosis in his arm. After having complained of a thick arm, he had to be put in intensive care and went through months of recovery.

== Personal life ==
Joppen grabbed headlines upon signing with NEC, as many, mainly female, followers had liked the club's social media post on their new player. Due to his good looks, he was able to attract a larger crowd of female fans to the Goffertstadion.

In February 2023, Joppen and Roda JC teammate Dylan Vente were involved in a scuffle at a night club in Heerlen during Carnival celebrations, which left both with injuries. A man was later arrested, who had attacked Joppen and Vente.

== Career statistics ==
As of match played 24 May 2025

Appearances and goals by club, season and competition
Club	Season	League			National cup		Other		Total	
Club	Season	Division	Apps	Goals	Apps	Goals	Apps	Goals	Apps	Goals
Helmond Sport	2007–08	Eerste Divisie	26	1	0	0	1 (Note: Appearances in Eredivisie promotion/relegation playoffs)	0	27	1
Helmond Sport	2008–09	Eerste Divisie	37	4	1	0	—		38	4
Helmond Sport	2009–10	Eerste Divisie	37	3	3	0	4	0	44	3
Helmond Sport	2010–11	Eerste Divisie	32	1	1	0	4	1	37	2
Helmond Sport	2011–12	Eerste Divisie	31	3	1	0	2	0	34	3
Helmond Sport	Total		163	12	6	0	11	1	180	13
VVV-Venlo	2012–13	Eredivisie	33	1	1	0	2	0	36	1
VVV-Venlo	2013–14	Eerste Divisie	31	0	2	0	1	0	34	2
VVV-Venlo	2014–15	Eerste Divisie	36	3	3	0	4	0	43	3
VVV-Venlo	Total		100	4	6	0	7	0	113	4
Willem II	2015–16	Eredivisie	15	1	2	0	4	0	21	1
Willem II	2016–17	Eredivisie	11	0	0	0	—		11	0
Willem II	Total		26	1	2	0	4	0	32	1
NEC	2017–18	Eerste Divisie	21	4	2	0	0	0	23	4
NEC	2018–19	Eerste Divisie	25	0	1	1	2	0	28	1
NEC	Total		46	4	3	1	2	0	51	5
Helmond Sport	2019–20	Eerste Divisie	25	1	1	0	—		26	1
Helmond Sport	2020–21	Eerste Divisie	26	0	0	0	—		26	0
Helmond Sport	Total		51	1	1	0	—		52	1
Roda JC	2021–22	Eerste Divisie	36	2	1	0	2	0	39	2
Roda JC	2022–23	Eerste Divisie	31	2	1	0	—		32	2
Roda JC	Total		67	4	2	0	2	0	71	4
De Treffers	2023–24	Tweede Divisie	30	1	3	0	—		33	1
De Treffers	2024–25	Tweede Divisie	33	3	1	0	—		34	3
De Treffers	Total		63	4	4	0	—		67	4
Career total			517	30	24	1	26	1	567	32
