= Kees Heemskerk =

Dutch footballer

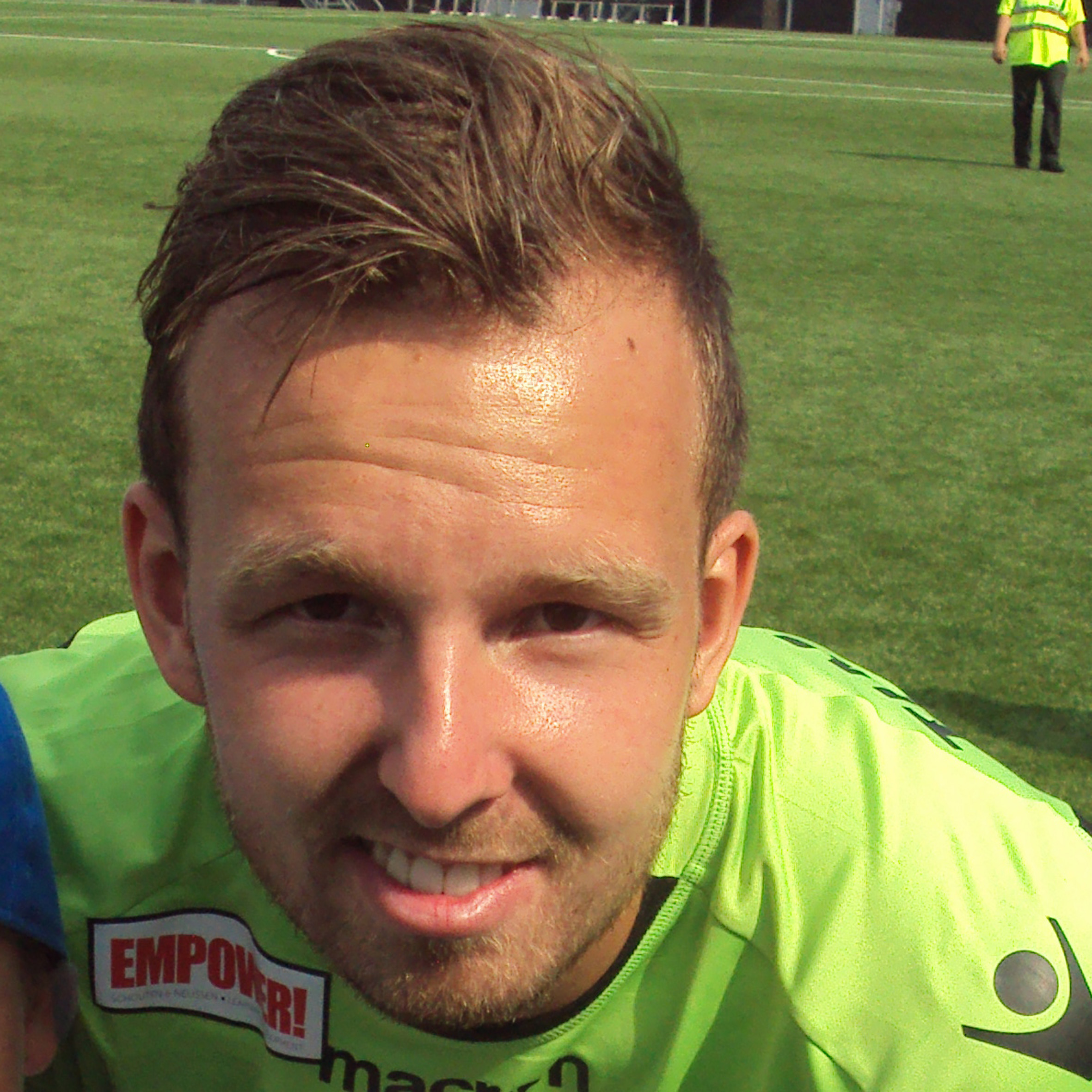
- Heemskerk in 2015

Personal information
- Full name: Kees Heemskerk
- Date of birth: 2 May 1991 (age 35)
- Place of birth: Zaanstad, Netherlands
- Height: 1.94 m (6 ft 4 in)
- Position: Goalkeeper

Youth career
- PSCK
- 2003-2010: Ajax
- 2011: River City Rovers

College career
| Years | Team | Apps | (Gls) |
| 2010-2013 | Charleston Cougars | | |

Senior career*
| Years | Team | Apps | (Gls) |
| 2014 | Kongsvinger IL | 7 | (0) |
| 2014–2018 | Den Bosch | 120 | (0) |
| 2018–2020 | RKC | 6 | (0) |
| 2021 | TEC | 8 | (0) |
| Total | | 141 | (0) |
- * Club domestic league appearances and goals as of 23 October 2020

Kees Heemskerk (born 2 May 1991) is a Dutch retired footballer who played as a goalkeeper.

== Career ==
Having played for the College of Charleston, Heemskerk was selected for the MLS Combine in January 2014. He did not progress from that players' camp and travelled to the far north of Norway to go on trial with 1. divisjon club Alta IF. The player backed out of a prospective deal, not liking the remote location and the polar night. He instead joined Kongsvinger IL in the same country, to which he was drawn by manager, and former Ajax player, André Bergdølmo.

He made a gaffe against Fløy, with Kongsvinger losing the match by one goal, and in May, Kongsvinger took on a new goalkeeper on trial. His contract expired on 30 June, and he moved back to the Netherlands. He played 7 matches in the 2014 2. divisjon and one in the cup.

He left Norway to sign for Den Bosch in his natiev country and became Etienne Vaessen's understudy at RKC after a couple of years. Heemskerk left amateur side TEC in December 2021 to focus on a social career.
