= Nikki Baggerman =

Dutch footballer (born 1997)

Personal information
- Date of birth: 17 October 1997 (age 29)
- Place of birth: Monster, Netherlands
- Height: 1.79 m (5 ft 10 in)
- Position: Midfielder

Team information
- Current team: Achilles Veen
- Number: 8

Youth career
- 2003–2005: SC Monster
- 2005–2016: ADO Den Haag

Senior career*
Years	Team	Apps	(Gls)
2016–2020	RKC	54	(2)
2020	→ TEC (loan)	5	(0)
2020–2021	Dordrecht	28	(0)
2022–	Achilles Veen		
- * Club domestic league appearances and goals as of 5 February 2022

Nikki Baggerman (born 17 October 1997) is a Dutch footballer who plays as a midfielder for Achilles Veen.

== Club career ==
He made his Eerste Divisie debut for RKC Waalwijk on 7 April 2017 in a game against De Graafschap. He moved to Dordrecht in 2020.

On 4 January 2022, Baggerman joined fifth-tier Hoofdklasse club Achilles Veen.

In May 2024, Baggerman collapsed on the pitch during a cup match while playing for Achilles. After being revived he was sent to a Tilburg hospital.
