= Jari Koenraat =

Dutch footballer (born 1995)

Personal information
- Date of birth: 26 September 1995 (age 31)
- Place of birth: Loon op Zand, Netherlands
- Height: 1.84 m (6 ft 0 in)
- Position: Right winger

Team information
- Current team: Achilles Veen
- Number: 7

Youth career
- VV Uno Animo

Senior career*
Years	Team	Apps	(Gls)
2013–2016	VV Uno Animo		
2016–2020	RKC Waalwijk	16	(1)
2020–2021	Blauw Geel '38	5	(3)
2021–2022	Dongen	30	(11)
2022–	Achilles Veen		
- * Club domestic league appearances and goals as of 27 November 2024

Jari Koenraat (born 26 September 1995) is a Dutch footballer who plays as a winger for Achilles Veen.

== Club career ==
He made his Eerste Divisie debut for RKC Waalwijk on 18 August 2017 in a game against FC Emmen.
