= Mandemakers Stadion =

Football/soccer stadium in Waalwijk, the Netherlands

Coordinates: 51°41′13″N 5°05′19″E

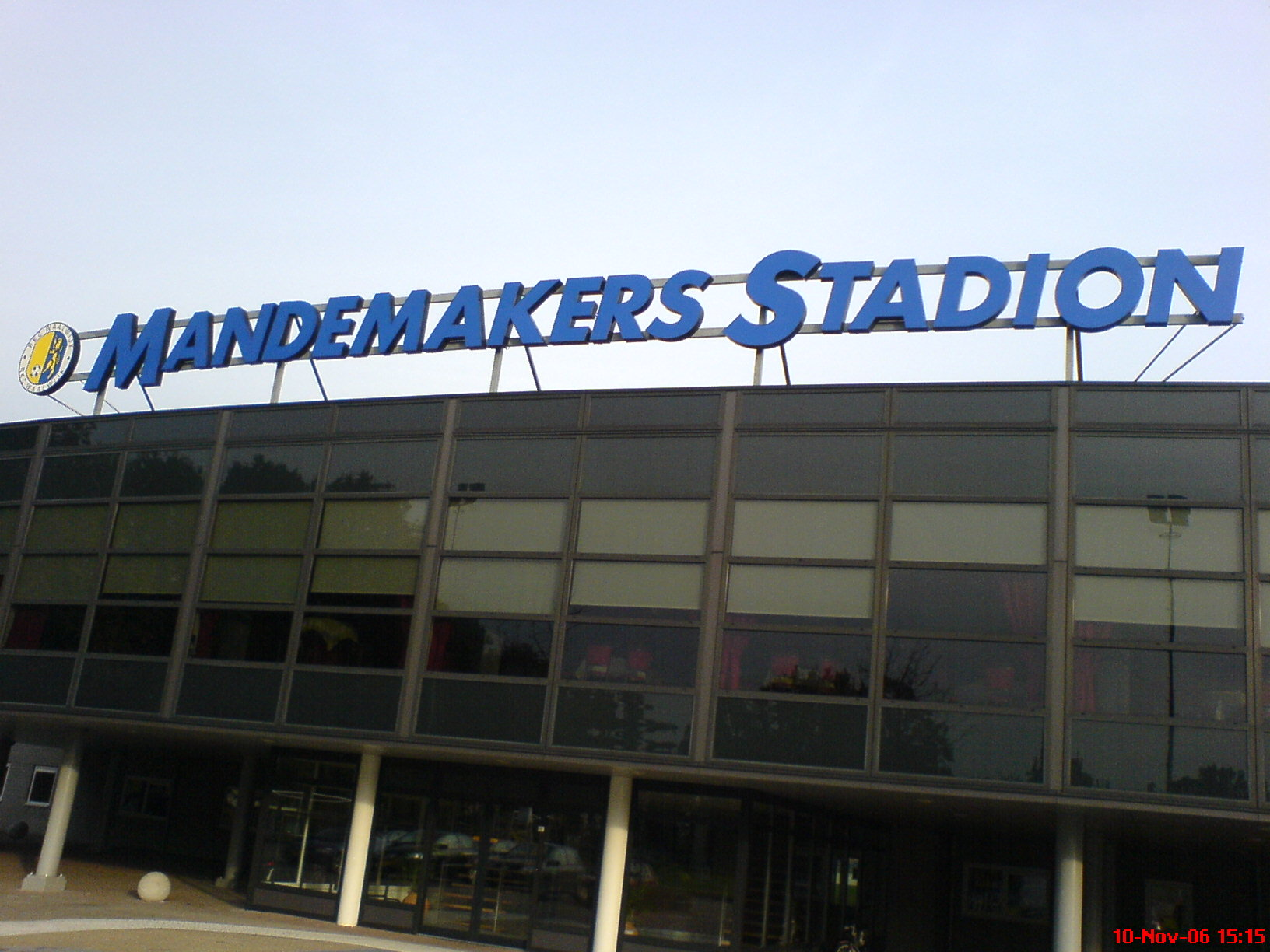
- Interactive map of Mandemakers Stadion
- Former names: Sportpark Olympia (1996–1999)
- Location: Waalwijk, Netherlands
- Capacity: 7,186
- Surface: Grass

Construction
- Opened: 1996
- Renovated: 2018–2019

Tenant
- RKC Waalwijk (1996–present)

The Mandemakers Stadion (Dutch pronunciation: [ˈmɑndəmaːkərs ˌstaːdijɔn]) is a multi-use stadium in Waalwijk, Netherlands. It is currently used mostly for football matches. RKC Waalwijk use the Mandemakers Stadion for home games. Built in 1996, the stadium has seen several minor expansions and presently has a seating capacity of 7,186.

The Mandemakers Stadion replaced the Sportpark Olympia stadium that was able to hold 6,200 people and opened in 1940. Sportpark Olympia is the name of the multi-use sports park in which the Mandemakers Stadion is located. Derde Klasse-side VV Baardwijk is one of many clubs in the sports park.

In European competitions, the stadium is known as RKC Waalwijk Stadion due to advertising rules.
