= Ingo van Weert =

Dutch footballer (born 1994)

Personal information
- Date of birth: 8 February 1994 (age 32)
- Place of birth: Vlijmen, Netherlands
- Height: 1.85 m (6 ft 1 in)
- Position: Centre back

Team information
- Current team: Achilles Veen
- Number: 4

Youth career
- Vlijmense Boys
- RKC Waalwijk

Senior career*
Years	Team	Apps	(Gls)
2013–2020	RKC Waalwijk	115	(6)
2020–2021	Stomil Olsztyn	8	(0)
2021	KTP	5	(0)
2021–2023	SteDoCo	18	(1)
2023–	Achilles Veen		
- * Club domestic league appearances and goals as of 8 February 2024

Ingo van Weert (born 8 February 1994) is a Dutch professional footballer who plays as a centre-back for Achilles Veen.

After playing for RKC Waalwijk for seven years, van Weert signed a two-year contract with Polish second tier club Stomil Olsztyn on 5 August 2020.
