= Paul Quasten =

Czech footballer (born 1985)

Personal information
- Full name: Paul Gerardus Quasten
- Date of birth: 13 March 1985 (age 41)
- Place of birth: Amsterdam, Netherlands
- Height: 1.80 m (5 ft 11 in)
- Position: Left-back

Youth career
- AS '80
- 1992–2004: Ajax

Senior career*
Years	Team	Apps	(Gls)
2004–2008	FC Volendam	80	(8)
2008–2010	Willem II	12	(1)
2013–2014	Ajax Zaterdag		
2014–2017	Almere City	80	(3)
2017–2021	RKC Waalwijk	89	(2)
2021–2022	Ajax Zaterdag	7	(0)

International career
2004	Czech Republic U19	6	(1)
2006	Czech Republic U21	2	(0)
- * Club domestic league appearances and goals

Paul Gerardus Quasten (Czech: Pavel Quasten; born 13 March 1985) is a Czech former professional footballer who played as a left-back.

== Club career ==
Born in Amsterdam to a Dutch father and Czech mother, Quasten progressed through the Ajax academy after joining from childhood AS '80. He never reached his breakthrough to the Ajax first team, and therefore signed his first senior contract with FC Volendam in 2004, where he made his debut on 24 November in a match against FC Emmen. His highlight during his time at Volendam, where he would appear in 80 matches through four seasons, was winning the second-tier Eerste Divisie championship in the 2007–08 season. The decisive match away at ADO Den Haag was Quasten's last for the club, as he had already signed a pre-contract with Willem II.

Quasten joined Willem II in the summer of 2008, where he competed with José Valencia and Léo Veloso for the starting position at left back. In the first months at the club, Quasten made 12 appearances and score one goal – against his former club Volendam. Right before the winter break, in the autumn of 2008, he suffered a serious knee injury. The injury would keep him sidelined for almost two years, with speculation that he was forced to retire from professional football due to the severity of the injury. In February 2010, however, he made his comeback in a match between Jong Willem II and Jong Feyenoord/Excelsior. A few months later, his contract with Willem II expired.

After three years of rehabilitating, Quasten began playing with his youth club AS '80 and later joined the Ajax Zaterdag team. In the 2013–14 season, Quasten and Ajax Zaterdag won promotion to the Topklasse. He then followed his former coach Fred Grim to Almere City, where the latter had become head coach, reviving Quasten's career in professional football. There, he made 90 appearances in which he scored three goals.

In June 2017, Quasten signed with Eerste Divisie club RKC Waalwijk, with whom he reached promotion to the top-tier Eredivisie in 2019.

In July 2021, he announced his retirement from professional football. He then played one more year at amateur level for his former club Ajax Zaterdag.

== International career ==
Quasten played for the Czech highest level junior national team until 2006, but has never received his first senior cap with either Czech Republic or the Netherlands.

== Honours ==
Volendam

- Eerste Divisie: 2007–08
