= Anas Tahiri =

Moroccan footballer (born 1995)

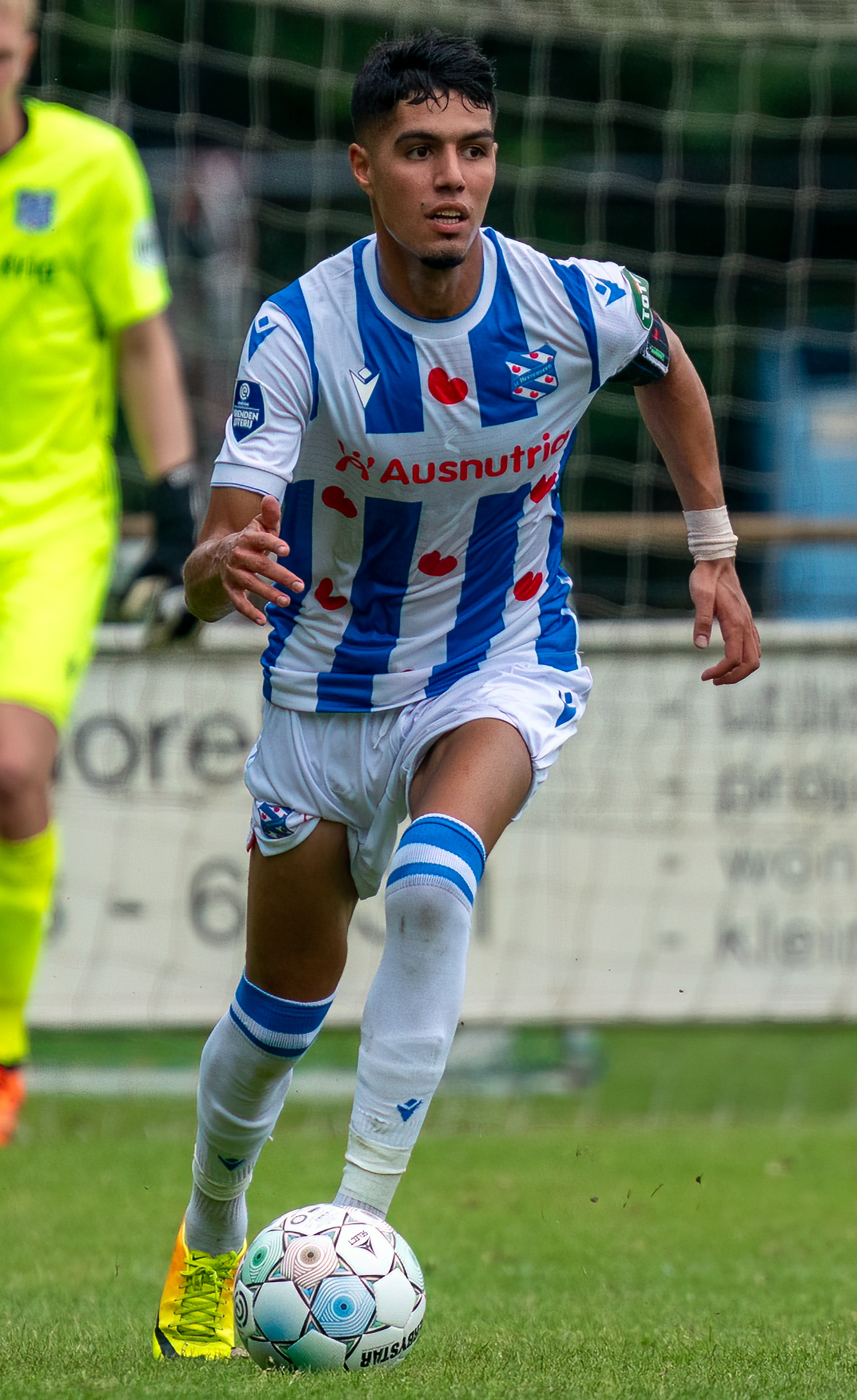
- Tahiri with Heerenveen in 2023

Personal information
- Date of birth: 15 May 1995 (age 31)
- Place of birth: Brussels, Belgium
- Height: 1.79 m (5 ft 10 in)
- Position: Midfielder

Team information
- Current team: MAS
- Number: 19

Youth career
- –2013: JMG Academy Lierse

Senior career*
Years	Team	Apps	(Gls)
2014–2018	Lierse	56	(4)
2018–2021	RKC Waalwijk	87	(6)
2021–2022	CFR Cluj	4	(1)
2022–2024	Heerenveen	72	(6)
2024–2025	Almere City	26	(0)
2025–	MAS	8	(0)

International career^{‡}
2016	Morocco U23	3	(0)
- * Club domestic league appearances and goals as of 9 November 2025 ‡ National team caps and goals as of 28 August 2016

Anas Tahiri (Arabic: أنس طاهيري; born 15 May 1995) is a professional footballer who plays as a midfielder for Moroccan club MAS. Born in Belgium, he represented Morocco at youth international level.

== Club career ==
Tahiri registered his Belgian Pro League debut for Lierse on 16 March 2014, aged 18, by replacing Ahmed El Messaoudi in the 87th minute of a 2–1 home defeat to Lokeren. He played 63 games and scored five times during his stint at the Lier-based club, before moving to the Netherlands with RKC Waalwijk in the summer of 2018.

Tahiri contributed with 39 appearances and two goals in the 2018–19 season, as RKC Waalwijk achieved promotion to the Eredivise; He made his debut in the latter competition on 3 August 2019, in a 3–1 away loss to VVV-Venlo, and netted his first goal two weeks later in a 3–3 draw with Twente.

On 10 June 2021, he changed countries again after agreeing to a contract with CFR Cluj in Romania.

On 7 January 2022, Tahiri returned to the Netherlands and signed a two-and-a-half-year contract with Heerenveen.

On 3 September 2024, Tahiri joined Almere City on a two-season contract.

== International career ==
Tahiri earned his first cap for the Morocco national under-23 team in a friendly 1–0 win against Cameroon, on 5 June 2016.

== Honours ==
RKC Waalwijk

- Eerste Divisie play-off winner : 2018–19 Eerste Divisie

CFR Cluj

- Liga I: 2021–22
- Supercupa României runner-up: 2021
