= 2022–23 RKC Waalwijk season =

RKC Waalwijk
2022–23 season
- Chairman: Peter Konijnenburg
- Head coach: Joseph Oosting
- Stadium: Mandemakers Stadion
- Eredivisie: 9th
- KNVB Cup: First round
- Top goalscorer: League: Michiel Kramer (12); All: Michiel Kramer (12)

The 2022–23 season was the 83rd season in the existence of RKC Waalwijk and the club's fourth consecutive season in the top flight of Dutch football. In addition to the domestic league, RKC Waalwijk participated in this season's edition of the KNVB Cup.

== Players ==
As of 1 January 2023

Note: Flags indicate national team as defined under FIFA eligibility rules; some limited exceptions apply. Players may hold more than one non-FIFA nationality.

No.	Pos.	Nation	Player
1	GK	NED	Etienne Vaessen
2	DF	NED	Julian Lelieveld
4	DF	BEL	Shawn Adewoye
5	DF	BEL	Thierry Lutonda
6	MF	CUW	Vurnon Anita
7	FW	ESP	Julen Lobete (on loan from Celta)
8	MF	NED	Patrick Vroegh
9	FW	DEN	Mika Biereth (on loan from Arsenal)
10	MF	SUR	Florian Jozefzoon
11	MF	MAR	Iliass Bel Hassani
12	MF	NED	Hans Mulder
13	GK	NED	Mark Spenkelink
14	MF	NED	Pelle Clement
15	DF	NED	Lars Nieuwpoort

No.	Pos.	Nation	Player
17	FW	NED	Roy Kuijpers
19	MF	BEL	Zakaria Bakkali
20	FW	NED	Mats Seuntjens
21	GK	POR	Joel Castro Pereira
22	FW	COM	Saïd Bakari
23	DF	CUW	Juriën Gaari
24	DF	BEL	Dario Van den Buijs
26	MF	BEL	Sebbe Augustijns
29	FW	NED	Michiel Kramer (captain)
31	GK	NED	Joey Kesting
33	MF	NED	Yassin Oukili
34	DF	NED	Luuk Wouters
35	MF	CUW	Kevin Felida
37	MF	BEL	Chris Lokesa

=== Out on loan ===
Note: Flags indicate national team as defined under FIFA eligibility rules; some limited exceptions apply. Players may hold more than one non-FIFA nationality.

No.	Pos.	Nation	Player
—	FW	NED	David Min (at SC Telstar)

== Pre-season and friendlies ==
Win Draw Loss Fixtures

20 July 2022 Friendly	Borussia Mönchengladbach (Germany)	1–1	(Netherlands) RKC Waalwijk	Velbert
18:30 CEST (UTC+2)	Pléa 30'; Stindl (penalty missed) 53'		Daneels 19'	Stadium: IMS Arena; Attendance: 1,100

30 July 2022 Friendly	RKC Waalwijk (Netherlands)	1–1	(Netherlands) SC Cambuur	Waalwijk
18:00 CEST (UTC+2)				Stadium: Mandemakers Stadion

13 December 2022 Friendly	Sint-Truiden (Belgium)	3–0	(Netherlands) RKC Waalwijk	Geel, Belgium
18:30 CET (UTC+1)	Konaté 11'; Hayashi 27'; Okazaki 78'	Report		Stadium: De Leunen

22 December 2022 Friendly	Roma (Italy)	3–0	(Netherlands) RKC Waalwijk	Albufeira, Portugal
16:00 CET (UTC+1)				Stadium: Estádio Municipal de Albufeira

23 March 2023 Friendly	RKC Waalwijk (Netherlands)	0–6	(Netherlands) Almere City	Waalwijk
13:00 CET (UTC+1)				Stadium: Mandemakers Stadion

== Competitions ==
=== Overall record ===
Competition	First match	Last match	Starting round	Final position	Record							
Competition	First match	Last match	Starting round	Final position	Pld	W	D	L	GF	GA	GD	Win %
Eredivisie	6 August 2022	28 May 2023	Matchday 1	9th	34	11	8	15	50	64	−14	32.35
KNVB Cup	19 October 2022		First round	First round	1	0	0	1	0	2	−2	0.00
Total					35	11	8	16	50	66	−16	31.43

Source: Competitions

=== Eredivisie ===
==== League table ====
Pos	Team	Pld	W	D	L	GF	GA	GD	Pts	Qualification or relegation
7	Utrecht	34	15	9	10	55	50	+5	54	Qualification to European competition play-offs
8	Heerenveen	34	12	10	12	44	50	−6	46	Qualification to European competition play-offs
9	RKC Waalwijk	34	11	8	15	50	64	−14	41	
10	Vitesse	34	10	10	14	45	50	−5	40	
11	Go Ahead Eagles	34	10	10	14	46	56	−10	40	

Source: Eredivisie
Rules for classification: Season in progress: 1) Most points won; 2) Less points lost; 3) Goal difference; 4) Goals scored; 5) Alphabetical order; End of season: 1) Points; 2) Goal difference; 3) Goals scored; 4) Head-to-head points; 5) Head-to-head goal difference; 6) Head-to-head away goals scored; 7) Play-off if relevant for deciding champion, relegation or participating in a European league, otherwise by draw. 8) Penalty shoot-out (only after a play-off)

==== Results summary ====
Overall								Home						Away					
Pld	W	D	L	GF	GA	GD	Pts	W	D	L	GF	GA	GD	W	D	L	GF	GA	GD
34	11	8	15	50	64	−14	41	9	3	5	34	26	+8	2	5	10	16	38	−22

Last updated: 28 May 2023.
Source: Eredivisie

==== Results by round ====
Round	1	2	3	4	5	6	7	8	9	10	11	12	13	14	15	16	17	18	19	20	21	22	23	24	25	26	27	28	29	30	31	32	33	34
Ground	H	A	H	A	H	A	H	H	A	A	H	A	H	A	H	A	H	A	H	A	A	H	A	H	A	H	H	A	H	A	H	A	H	A
Result	D	D	L	D	W	L	W	D	W	D	L	L	W	L	D	L	W	D	W	D	L	W	W	L	L	L	W	L	W	L	W	L	L	L
Position	10	8	13	14	8	12	8	9	7	7	9	9	9	10	11	11	10	10	9	9	9	9	8	8	8	10	8	10	8	9	9	9	9	9

Updated to match(es) played on 28 May 2023. Source: Eredivisie
A = Away; H = Home; W = Win; D = Draw; L = Loss

==== Matches ====
The league fixtures were announced on 17 June 2022.

6 August 2022 1	RKC Waalwijk	2–2	FC Utrecht	Waalwijk
	Van den Buijs 15'; Hassani 45'; Oukili (yellow card) 79'	Report	Dost 52', 85'	Stadium: Mandemakers Stadion; Attendance: 4,526; Referee: Rob Dieperink

13 August 2022 2	FC Emmen	1–1	RKC Waalwijk	Emmen
	Araujo (yellow card) 45+4'; Bernadou (yellow card) 48', (goal) 58'; Veldmate (yellow card) 90+2'	Report	Kramer (yellow card) 12'; Lobete 89'	Stadium: De Oude Meerdijk; Attendance: 7,829; Referee: Dennis Johan Higler

21 August 2022 3	RKC Waalwijk	0–1	Feyenoord	Waalwijk
	Hassani (yellow card) 27'; Gaari (yellow card) 89'	Report	Danilo 68' (pen.)	Stadium: Mandemakers Stadion; Attendance: 6,578; Referee: Edwin van de Graaf

27 August 2022 4	Vitesse	2–2	RKC Waalwijk	Arnhem
	Bero 61' (pen.); Flamingo 71'; Yapi (yellow card) 73'	Report	Jozefzoon 35'; Oukili (yellow card) 45'; Hassani 50'	Stadium: GelreDome; Attendance: 10,598; Referee: Pol van Boekel

4 September 2022 5	RKC Waalwijk	5–2	Excelsior	Waalwijk
	Adewoye 38'; Gaari (yellow card) 45+4'; Clement 50'; Lutonda 60'; Anita 80'; Kramer 90+1'	Report	Baas 15'; El Yaakoubi 43'; Eijgenraam (yellow card) 81'	Stadium: Mandemakers Stadion; Attendance: 4,332; Referee: Jannick van der Laan

11 September 2022 6	PSV	1–0	RKC Waalwijk	Eindhoven
	Gutiérrez (yellow card) 64'; Gakpo 90+6' (pen.)	Report	Gaari (yellow card) 23'; Adewoye (yellow card) 45'; Van den Buijs (yellow card) 74'; Kramer (yellow card) 85'; Vaessen (yellow card) 90+4'	Stadium: Philips Stadion; Attendance: 28,432; Referee: Serdar Gözübüyük

17 September 2022 7	RKC Waalwijk	5–1	Cambuur	Waalwijk
	Lobete (yellow card) 22'; Kramer 32' (pen.), 89'; Lelieveld (yellow card) 57'; Tol 77' (o.g.); Bakkali 82'; Hassani 86'	Report	Hoedemakers (red card) 8'; Jacobs 17', (yellow card) 31'; Paulissen (yellow card) 23'; Bangura (red card) 45+1'	Stadium: Mandemakers Stadion; Attendance: 4,555; Referee: Sander van der Eijk

2 October 2022 8	RKC Waalwijk	2–2	Sparta Rotterdam	Waalwijk
	Kramer 10'; Hassani 60', (yellow card) 67'; Adewoye (yellow card) 90'	Report	Verschueren 35', 75'; Sambo (red card) 63'	Stadium: Mandemakers Stadion; Attendance: 5,647; Referee: Ingmar Oostrom

7 October 2022 9	FC Groningen	2–3	RKC Waalwijk	Groningen
	Pepi 14' (pen.), 76'; te Wierik (yellow card) 35'; Balker (red card) 36'	Report	Van den Buijs 38' (pen.); Biereth 61', 80', (yellow card) 83'; Oukili (yellow card) 83'	Stadium: Euroborg; Attendance: 18,835; Referee: Martin van den Kerkhof

15 October 2022 10	Fortuna Sittard	0–0	RKC Waalwijk	Sittard
	Embaló (yellow card) 30'; Navarro (yellow card) 32'; Özyakup (yellow card) 38'	Report	Kuijpers (yellow card) 71'; Kramer (yellow card) 90+8'	Stadium: Fortuna Sittard Stadion; Attendance: 11,043; Referee: Joey Kooij

22 October 2022 11	RKC Waalwijk	1–4	AFC Ajax	Waalwijk
	Gaari (yellow card) 2'; Oukili (yellow card) 18'; Clement 40'; Adewoye (yellow card) 58'	Report	Berghuis 22', 53'; Blind (yellow card) 43'; Grillitsch (yellow card) 55'; Brobbey 62', 81'	Stadium: Mandemakers Stadion; Attendance: 7,508; Referee: Jeroen Manschot

30 October 2022 12	FC Twente	3–0	RKC Waalwijk	Enschede
	Steijn 34', 45'; Pröpper (yellow card) 46'; van Wolfswinkel 89'	Report	Lelieveld (yellow card) 6'; Augustijns (yellow card) 85'	Stadium: De Grolsch Veste; Attendance: 29,100; Referee: Rob Dieperink

6 November 2022 13	RKC Waalwijk	3–1	AZ	Waalwijk
	Anita (yellow card) 22'; Hassani 32'; Bakkali 87', 90+2'	Report	Karlsson 9', (yellow card) 90+6'; Clasie (yellow card) 65'; de Wit (yellow card) 83'	Stadium: Mandemakers Stadion; Attendance: 5,067; Referee: Martin van den Kerkhof

13 November 2022 14	NEC	6–1	RKC Waalwijk	Nijmegen
	El Karouani (yellow card) 36', (goal) 50'; Dimata 38' (pen.); Mattsson 73'; Marques 78', 90+2'; Tavşan 88'	Report	Van den Buijs 4' (pen.); Hassani (red card) 11'; Gaari (yellow card) 58'; Anita (yellow card) 90+1'	Stadium: Goffertstadion; Attendance: 12,500; Referee: Martin Perez

7 January 2023 15	RKC Waalwijk	0–0	SC Heerenveen	Waalwijk
	Adewoye (yellow card) 40'	Report	Haye (yellow card) 26'	Stadium: Mandemakers Stadion; Attendance: 6,143; Referee: Edwin van de Graaf

14 January 2023 16	FC Volendam	2–1	RKC Waalwijk	Volendam
	Murkin (yellow card) 31'; Mbuyamba 69'; Da Silva 81'	Report	Seuntjens 63'	Stadium: Kras Stadion; Attendance: 6,604; Referee: Bas Nijhuis

24 January 2023 18	Sparta Rotterdam	0–0	RKC Waalwijk	Rotterdam
		Report		Stadium: Sparta Stadion; Attendance: 9,720; Referee: Danny Desmond Makkelie

28 January 2023 19	RKC Waalwijk	2–0	FC Emmen	Waalwijk
	Kramer 3', (yellow card) 55'; Hassani (red card) 50'; Anita (yellow card) 64'; Augustijns (yellow card) 89'; Oukili (yellow card) 90+4'	Report	Bouchouari (yellow card) 5'	Stadium: Mandemakers Stadion; Attendance: 6,562; Referee: Robin Hensgens

1 February 2023 17	RKC Waalwijk	3–1	Go Ahead Eagles	Waalwijk
	Seuntjens 23'; Clement (yellow card) 41'; Lelieveld (yellow card) 47'; Kramer 71'; Oukili 78'	Report	Fontán 45+1', (yellow card) 69'; Amofa (yellow card) 69'	Stadium: Mandemakers Stadion; Attendance: 5,481; Referee: Alex Bos

4 February 2023 20	Excelsior	0–0	RKC Waalwijk	Rotterdam
	Horemans (yellow card) 90+3'	Report	Seuntjens (yellow card) 40'; Vaessen (yellow card) 90'	Stadium: Van Donge & De Roo Stadion; Attendance: 4,400; Referee: Marc Nagtegaal

12 February 2023 21	AFC Ajax	3–1	RKC Waalwijk	Amsterdam
	Klaassen (yellow card) 41'; Brobbey 50'; Timber 78'; Kudus 81'; Berghuis (yellow card) 84'	Report	Seuntjens 17'; Lelieveld (yellow card) 77'; Oukili (yellow card) 77'	Stadium: Johan Cruyff Arena; Attendance: 53,809; Referee: Sander van der Eijk

17 February 2023 22	RKC Waalwijk	3–1	Fortuna Sittard	Waalwijk
	Kramer 76'; Lobete 86'; Jozefzoon 90'; Nieuwpoort (yellow card) 90+8'	Report	Yılmaz 49', (yellow card) 90+1'; Embaló (yellow card) 59'; Córdoba (yellow card) 71'	Stadium: Mandemakers Stadion; Attendance: 5,692; Referee: Bas Nijhuis

25 February 2023 23	SC Heerenveen	1–4	RKC Waalwijk	Heerenveen
	van Hooijdonk 35'; Olsson (yellow card) 57'; Bruma (yellow card) 62'	Report	Jozefzoon 61', 90+4', (yellow card) 72'; Adewoye (yellow card) 68'; Lelieveld 75'; Oukili 77'	Stadium: Abe Lenstra Stadion; Attendance: 20, 109; Referee: Rob Dieperink

5 March 2023 24	RKC Waalwijk	0–1	PSV	Waalwijk
	Van den Buijs (yellow card) 45'; Gaari (yellow card) 82'	Report	Bakayoko 35'; Silva (yellow card) 70'; van Aanholt (yellow card) 72'; El Ghazi (yellow card) 85'; Sangaré (yellow card) 90+1'	Stadium: Mandemakers Stadion; Attendance: 7,419; Referee: Martin van den Kerkhof

18 March 2023 26	RKC Waalwijk	1–3	NEC	Waalwijk
	Oukili (yellow card) 29'; Vaessen (yellow card) 46'; Anita 61'	Report	Tannane 18', 31', (penalty missed) 71'; Tavşan 26'; El Karouani (yellow card) 76'	Stadium: Mandemakers Stadion; Attendance: 6,418; Referee: Dennis Johan Higler

1 April 2023 27	RKC Waalwijk	1–0	Vitesse	Waalwijk
	Kramer 27', (yellow card) 83'	Report	Kozłowski (yellow card) 60'; Jonathans (yellow card) 90'	Stadium: Mandemakers Stadion; Attendance: 6,147; Referee: Serdar Gözübüyük

9 April 2023 28	Feyenoord	5–1	RKC Waalwijk	Rotterdam
	Oukili 29' (o.g.); Paixão 31', 53'; Hartman 39'; Hancko (yellow card) 51'; Giménez 61'	Report	Lobete 68', (yellow card) 83'	Stadium: De Kuip; Attendance: 47,500; Referee: Jochem Kamphuis

15 April 2023 29	RKC Waalwijk	2–1	FC Groningen	Waalwijk
	Kramer 64', 86' (pen.)	Report	Chaluš (yellow card) 43'; Pepi 67'	Stadium: Mandemakers Stadion; Attendance: 6,738; Referee: Sander van der Eijk

19 April 2023 25	Go Ahead Eagles	3–2	RKC Waalwijk	Deventer
	Linthorst 15'; Deijl 23'; Willumsson (penalty missed) 45'; Lidberg 90+5'	Report	Kramer 8', 55'; Lutonda (yellow card) 40'	Stadium: De Adelaarshorst; Attendance: 9,723; Referee: Martin van den Kerkhof

23 April 2023 30	AZ Alkmaar	3–0	RKC Waalwijk	Alkmaar
	Mijnans 8'; Lahdo 50'; van Brederode 63'	Report	Van den Buijs (yellow card) 90+2'	Stadium: AFAS Stadion; Attendance: 16,787; Referee: Allard Lindhout

5 May 2023 31	RKC Waalwijk	4–1	FC Volendam	Waalwijk
	Oukili 4'; Jozefzoon 35'; Seuntjens 49'; Adewoye (yellow card) 82'; Lobete 88'	Report	Antonucci 52'; Mbuyamba (yellow card) 84'	Stadium: Mandemakers Stadion; Attendance: 6,924; Referee: Bas Nijhuis

13 May 2023 32	FC Utrecht	2–0	RKC Waalwijk	Utrecht
	Bakasetas (penalty missed) 20', 60'; Toornstra (yellow card) 65'; Labyad 90+3'	Report	Adewoye (yellow card) 18'; Gaari (yellow card) 54'	Stadium: Stadion Galgenwaard; Attendance: 18,926; Referee: Ingmar Oostrom

21 May 2023 33	RKC Waalwijk	0–5	FC Twente	Waalwijk
	Gaari (yellow card) 30'; Kramer (yellow card) 49'; Oukili (yellow card) 61'	Report	Smal 10'; Ugalde 34'; Zerrouki 50', (yellow card) 60'; Sadílek 74'; Pleguezuelo 86'	Stadium: Mandemakers Stadion; Attendance: 6,833; Referee: Jeroen Manschot

28 May 2023 34	SC Cambuur	4–0	RKC Waalwijk	Leeuwarden
	Uldriķis (yellow card) 40', (goal) 45+5'; Sambissa 45+7', (yellow card) 50'; Foor 55'; Smit 67'	Report	Oukili (yellow card) 6'	Stadium: Cambuur Stadion; Attendance: 9,600; Referee: Edwin van de Graaf

=== KNVB Cup ===
19 October 2022 Round 1	De Treffers	2–0	RKC Waalwijk	Groesbeek
	Vlijter 17'; Campman 67'	Report
