= List of Dutch football transfers summer 2023 =

This is a list of Dutch football transfers for the 2023 summer transfer window. Only transfers featuring Eredivisie are listed.

== Eredivisie ==
Note: Flags indicate national team as has been defined under FIFA eligibility rules. Players may hold more than one non-FIFA nationality.

=== Ajax ===
In:

No.	Pos.	Nation	Player
3	DF	DEN	Anton Gaaei (from (Denmark) Viborg)
6	MF	NOR	Sivert Mannsverk (from (Norway) Molde)
10	FW	NGR	Chuba Akpom (from (England) Middlesbrough)
11	FW	POR	Carlos Forbs (from (England) Manchester City)
18	DF	CRO	Jakov Medić (from (Germany) FC St. Pauli)
19	FW	GEO	Georges Mikautadze (from (France) Metz)
21	MF	NED	Branco van den Boomen (from (France) Toulouse)
25	DF	CRO	Borna Sosa (from (Germany) VfB Stuttgart)
30	DF	ARG	Gastón Ávila (from (Belgium) Antwerp)
33	MF	BIH	Benjamin Tahirović (from (Italy) Roma)
37	DF	CRO	Josip Šutalo (from (Croatia) Dinamo Zagreb)
40	GK	GER	Diant Ramaj (from (Germany) Eintracht Frankfurt)

Out:

No.	Pos.	Nation	Player
1	GK	NED	Maarten Stekelenburg (retired)
2	DF	NED	Jurriën Timber (to (England) Arsenal)
3	DF	NGR	Calvin Bassey (to (England) Fulham)
4	MF	MEX	Edson Álvarez (to (England) West Ham United)
5	DF	NED	Owen Wijndal (on loan to (Belgium) Royal Antwerp)
6	MF	NED	Davy Klaassen (to (Italy) Inter)
10	FW	SRB	Dušan Tadić (to (Turkey) Fenerbahçe)
18	FW	ITA	Lorenzo Lucca (loan return to (Italy) Pisa)
19	DF	MEX	Jorge Sánchez (on loan to (Portugal) Porto)
20	MF	GHA	Mohammed Kudus (to (England) West Ham United)
21	MF	AUT	Florian Grillitsch (to (Germany) TSG 1899 Hoffenheim)
25	DF	NED	Youri Baas (on loan to NEC)
26	MF	NED	Youri Regeer (to Twente)
28	MF	NED	Kian Fitz-Jim (on loan to Excelsior)
30	FW	DEN	Mohamed Daramy (to (France) Stade Reims)
35	FW	POR	Francisco Conceição (on loan to (Portugal) Porto)
—	FW	TUR	Naci Ünüvar (on loan to Twente, previously on loan at (Turkey) Trabzonspor)
—	DF	NED	Kik Pierie (to Excelsior, previously on loan)

=== Almere City ===
In:

No.	Pos.	Nation	Player
2	DF	CUW	Sherel Floranus (from (Turkey) Antalyaspor)
5	DF	FRA	Loïc Mbe Soh (on loan from (England) Nottingham Forest, previously on loan at (France) Guingamp)
9	FW	FRA	Thomas Robinet (from (Belgium) Oostende, previously on loan at (France) Nancy)
11	FW	COD	Yann Kitala (on loan from (France) Le Havre)
15	MF	NED	Peer Koopmeiners (on loan from AZ, previously on loan at Excelsior)
18	GK	AUT	Samuel Şahin-Radlinger (on loan from Austria Wien)
19	FW	FRA	Yoann Cathline (on loan from (France) Lorient)
25	DF	NED	Christopher Mamengi (from Jong FC Utrecht)

Out:

No.	Pos.	Nation	Player
1	GK	IRI	Agil Etemadi (retired)
5	DF	NED	Thomas Poll (on loan to Cambuur)
6	MF	NED	Tim Receveur (to Dordrecht, previously on loan)
9	FW	SUR	Jeredy Hilterman (on loan to Willem II)
11	FW	NED	Ilias Alhaft (to (Armenia) Noah)
25	MF	NED	Jorrit Smeets (to Emmen)
46	DF	NED	Niciano Grootfaam (free agent)

=== AZ ===
In:

No.	Pos.	Nation	Player
5	DF	POR	Alexandre Penetra (from (Portugal) Famalicão)
6	MF	POR	Tiago Dantas (on loan from (Portugal) Benfica, previously on loan at (Greece) PAOK)
11	FW	GHA	Ibrahim Sadiq (from (Sweden) Häcken)
15	FW	NED	Ruben van Bommel (from MVV)
18	DF	NOR	David Møller Wolfe (from (Norway) Brann)
30	DF	NED	Denso Kasius (from (Italy) Bologna, previously on loan at (Austria) Rapid Wien)

Out:

No.	Pos.	Nation	Player
3	DF	GRE	Pantelis Chatzidiakos (to (Italy) Cagliari)
5	DF	HUN	Milos Kerkez (to (England) Bournemouth)
6	MF	NED	Tijjani Reijnders (to (Italy) Milan)
11	FW	SWE	Jesper Karlsson (to (Italy) Bologna)
17	FW	TUR	Yusuf Barası (to (Turkey) Adana Demirspor)
27	DF	BEL	Zinho Vanheusden (loan return to (Italy) Inter Milan)
28	MF	NED	Zico Buurmeester (on loan to PEC Zwolle)
31	DF	NED	Sam Beukema (to (Italy) Bologna)
—	GK	DEN	Peter Vindahl Jensen (on loan to (Czech Republic) Sparta Prague, previously on loan at (Germany) 1. FC Nürnberg)
—	MF	NED	Peer Koopmeiners (on loan to Almere City, previously on loan at Excelsior)
—	GK	NED	Mees Bakker (to De Graafschap, previously on loan)

=== Excelsior ===
In:

No.	Pos.	Nation	Player
3	DF	NED	Kik Pierie (from Ajax, previously on loan)
5	DF	SWE	Casper Widell (from (Sweden) Helsingborg)
8	MF	BEL	Cisse Sandra (from (Belgium) Club Brugge)
9	FW	IRL	Troy Parrott (from (England) Tottenham Hotspur U21, previously on loan at (England) Preston North End)
10	MF	NED	Kian Fitz-Jim (from Ajax)
11	FW	SWE	Oscar Uddenäs (from (Sweden) Häcken)
12	DF	FRA	Arthur Zagré (from (France) Monaco, previously on loan)
17	FW	SWE	Richie Omorowa (from (Sweden) Brommapojkarna)
20	MF	NED	Lennard Hartjes (on loan from Feyenoord, previously on loan at Roda JC)
26	DF	NED	Mimeirhel Benita (on loan from Feyenoord)
28	DF	NED	Ian Smeulers (from (Norway) Sandefjord)
30	FW	NED	Derensili Sanches Fernandes (from Utrecht)

Out:

No.	Pos.	Nation	Player
6	MF	NED	Joshua Eijgenraam (on loan to TOP Oss)
8	MF	NED	Kenzo Goudmijn (loan return to AZ)
9	FW	NED	Reda Kharchouch (to (Saudi Arabia) Al-Bukiryah)
10	FW	NED	Marouan Azarkan (loan return to Feyenoord)
17	DF	GER	Maxime Awoudja (free agent)
23	MF	NED	Peer Koopmeiners (loan return to AZ)
24	DF	CUW	Nathan Markelo (to Fortuna Sittard)
27	FW	NED	Vicente Besuijen (loan return to (Scotland) Aberdeen)
28	DF	NED	Nathan Tjoe-A-On (to (England) Swansea City)
—	MF	NED	Michael Chacón (to Helmond Sport, previously on loan)
—	FW	NED	Luuk Admiraal (to Sparta Rotterdam, previously on loan at Spakenburg)

=== Feyenoord ===
In:

No.	Pos.	Nation	Player
2	DF	NED	Bart Nieuwkoop (from (Belgium) Union SG)
6	MF	ALG	Ramiz Zerrouki (from Twente)
9	FW	JPN	Ayase Ueda (from (Belgium) Cercle Brugge)
10	FW	NED	Calvin Stengs (from (France) Nice, previously on loan at (Belgium) Antwerp)
16	MF	NED	Thomas van den Belt (from PEC Zwolle)
17	FW	CRO	Luka Ivanušec (from (Croatia) Dinamo Zagreb)
19	FW	GAM	Yankuba Minteh (on loan from (England) Newcastle United)
21	DF	NED	Thomas Beelen (from PEC Zwolle)
22	GK	GER	Timon Wellenreuther (from (Belgium) Anderlecht, previously on loan)
31	GK	GRE	Kostas Lamprou (from Willem II)
32	MF	CZE	Ondřej Lingr (on loan from (Czech Republic) Slavia Prague)
39	GK	NED	Mikki van Sas (from (England) Manchester City U21)
—	DF	BEL	Antef Tsoungui (from (England) Brighton & Hove Albion, previously on loan at (Belgium) Lommel)
—	MF	MAR	Ilias Sebaoui (from (Belgium) Beerschot)

Out:

No.	Pos.	Nation	Player
2	DF	NOR	Marcus Holmgren Pedersen (on loan to (Italy) Sassuolo)
6	DF	DEN	Jacob Rasmussen (loan return to (Italy) Fiorentina)
9	FW	BRA	Danilo (to (Scotland) Rangers)
10	MF	TUR	Orkun Kökçü (to (Portugal) Benfica)
17	MF	POL	Sebastian Szymański (loan return to (Russia) Dynamo Moscow)
21	GK	ISR	Ofir Marciano (to (Israel) Hapoel Be'er Sheva)
23	FW	SWE	Patrik Wålemark (on loan to SC Heerenveen)
24	DF	NED	Mimeirhel Benita (on loan to Excelsior)
25	MF	NED	Mohamed Taabouni (to (Qatar) Al-Arabi)
26	FW	MAR	Oussama Idrissi (loan return to (Spain) Sevilla)
28	DF	NED	Neraysho Kasanwirjo (on loan to (Austria) Rapid Wien)
30	MF	ARG	Ezequiel Bullaude (on loan to (Argentina) Boca Juniors)
49	GK	NED	Tein Troost (to NAC Breda)
—	GK	NED	Thijs Jansen (on loan to De Graafschap, previously on loan at TOP Oss)
—	DF	BEL	Antef Tsoungui (on loan to Dordrecht)
—	MF	MAR	Ilias Sebaoui (on loan to Dordrecht)
—	DF	NED	Denzel Hall (to Heerenveen, previously on loan at ADO Den Haag)
—	MF	NED	Mark Diemers (to (Cyprus) AEK Larnaca, previously on loan at Emmen)
—	FW	NED	Marouan Azarkan (to Utrecht, previously on loan at Excelsior)
—	FW	GER	Christian Conteh (to (Germany) VfL Osnabrück, previously on loan at (Germany) Dynamo Dresden)
—	FW	SVK	Róbert Boženík (to (Portugal) Boavista, previously on loan)
—	FW	NED	Naoufal Bannis (to (Qatar) Al-Markhiya, previously on loan at Eindhoven)
—	MF	BEL	Francesco Antonucci (to (Qatar) Al-Shahania, previously on loan at Volendam)
—	DF	NED	Ramon Hendriks (on loan to Vitesse, previously on loan at Utrecht)

=== Fortuna Sittard ===
In:

No.	Pos.	Nation	Player
1	GK	NED	Luuk Koopmans (from ADO Den Haag)
2	DF	BEL	Siemen Voet (on loan from (Slovakia) Slovan Bratislava)
3	DF	GER	Sadik Fofana (on loan from (Germany) Bayer 04 Leverkusen, previously on loan at (Germany) 1. FC Nürnberg)
9	FW	NED	Kaj Sierhuis (from (France) Stade Reims)
10	MF	CRO	Alen Halilović (free agent)
11	FW	SRB	Marko Lazetić (on loan from (Italy) Milan, previously on loan at (Austria) Rheindorf Altach)
17	FW	NED	Iman Griffith (on loan from AZ)
20	FW	ALG	Mouhamed Belkheir (from (Portugal) Vilafranquense)
24	DF	CUW	Nathan Markelo (from Excelsior)
31	GK	CRO	Ivor Pandur (from (Italy) Hellas Verona, previously on loan)
32	MF	FRA	Loreintz Rosier (from (Portugal) Estoril)
34	FW	NED	Ragnar Oratmangoen (on loan from Groningen)
35	DF	NED	Mitchell Dijks (from Vitesse)
39	FW	BEL	Milan Robberechts (from (Belgium) Jong KVM)

Out:

No.	Pos.	Nation	Player
1	GK	NED	Yanick van Osch (to Cambuur)
2	DF	ESP	Ximo Navarro (to (Spain) Deportivo La Coruña)
4	DF	NED	Roel Janssen (to VVV-Venlo)
5	DF	ENG	George Cox (free agent)
8	MF	CRO	Kristijan Bistrović (loan return to (Russia) CSKA Moscow)
11	FW	NED	Paul Gladon (to (Armenia) Noah)
17	FW	TUR	Burak Yılmaz (retired)
18	DF	NED	Mike van Beijnen (to Emmen)
21	MF	TUR	Doğan Erdoğan (free agent)
29	FW	NED	Thomas Buitink (loan return to Vitesse)
34	FW	TUR	Tunahan Taşçı (on loan to MVV Maastricht)
55	DF	CRO	Stipe Radić (to (Bosnia and Herzegovina) Zrinjski Mostar)
74	FW	ITA	Gianmarco Cangiano (loan return to (Italy) Bologna)
85	FW	POR	Umaro Embaló (on loan to (Spain) Cartagena)
—	MF	NED	Richie Musaba (free agent)

=== Go Ahead Eagles ===
In:

No.	Pos.	Nation	Player
4	DF	NED	Joris Kramer (from NEC)
15	DF	NED	Dean James (from Volendam)
16	FW	SWE	Victor Edvardsen (from (Sweden) Djurgården)
17	FW	ESP	Dario Serra (from (Spain) Valencia Mestalla, previously on loan)
26	DF	NED	Luca Everink (from TOP Oss)
29	FW	NOR	Jakob Breum (from (Denmark) OB)
32	FW	BEL	Thibo Baeten (from (Belgium) Beerschot)

Out:

No.	Pos.	Nation	Player
4	DF	ESP	José Fontán (loan return to (Spain) Celta Vigo)
6	DF	NED	Jay Idzes (to (Italy) Venezia)
9	FW	SWE	Isac Lidberg (to Utrecht)
22	GK	GER	Luca Plogmann (on loan to Dordrecht)
26	DF	NOR	Fredrik Oppegård (loan return to PSV)
—	FW	NED	Martijn Berden (to VVV-Venlo, previously on loan)

=== SC Heerenveen ===
In:

No.	Pos.	Nation	Player
2	DF	NED	Denzel Hall (from Feyenoord, previously on loan at ADO Den Haag)
13	GK	NED	Mickey van der Hart (from Emmen)
14	MF	ENG	Charlie Webster (on loan from (England) Chelsea)
18	FW	MDA	Ion Nicolaescu (from (Israel) Beitar Jerusalem)
24	FW	SWE	Patrik Wålemark (on loan from Feyenoord)
28	MF	NED	Luuk Brouwers (on loan from Utrecht)

Out:

No.	Pos.	Nation	Player
1	GK	NED	Xavier Mous (free agent)
3	DF	NED	Joost van Aken (free agent)
8	FW	SWE	Alex Timossi Andersson (to (Sweden) Brommapojkarna)
10	MF	CRO	Tibor Halilović (to (Croatia) Dinamo Zagreb)
13	MF	TUN	Rami Kaib (to (Sweden) Djurgården)
17	FW	NED	Sydney van Hooijdonk (loan return to (Italy) Bologna)
22	MF	SWE	Rami Al Hajj (to (Denmark) OB)
25	DF	NED	Jeffrey Bruma (to RKC Waalwijk)
27	DF	NED	Milan van Ewijk (to (England) Coventry City)
29	FW	BEL	Antoine Colassin (loan return to (Belgium) Anderlecht)
34	DF	NED	Timo Zaal (to Feyenoord U21)

=== Heracles Almelo ===
In:

No.	Pos.	Nation	Player
3	DF	GER	Jannes Wieckhoff (from (Germany) FC St. Pauli)
7	FW	BEL	Bryan Limbombe (from Roda JC Kerkrade)
8	FW	GER	Mario Engels (from (Japan) Tokyo Verdy)
14	MF	BEL	Brian De Keersmaecker (from Eindhoven)
15	DF	NED	Jetro Willems (from Groningen)
16	GK	NED	Fabian de Keijzer (from Utrecht)
23	FW	NED	Jizz Hornkamp (from Willem II)
44	FW	NED	Mohamed Sankoh (on loan from (Germany) VfB Stuttgart, previously on loan at Vitesse)

Out:

No.	Pos.	Nation	Player
5	DF	GER	Marco Rente (to Groningen)
7	FW	BEL	Ismail Azzaoui (to (Azerbaijan) Araz-Naxçıvan)
8	MF	BEL	Elias Sierra (to VVV-Venlo)
14	DF	BEL	Héritier Deyonge (free agent)
15	MF	BEL	Lucas Schoofs (to (Belgium) Lommel)
22	DF	CRO	Mateo Leš (to (Croatia) Gorica)
23	FW	CUW	Rigino Cicilia (to (Czech Republic) Slovácko)
25	DF	GHA	Robin Polley (to Telstar)
26	GK	NED	Koen Bucker (to Roda JC Kerkrade)
33	FW	SWE	Samuel Armenteros (to (Saudi Arabia) Al-Kholood)

=== NEC ===
In:

No.	Pos.	Nation	Player
2	DF	FRA	Brayann Pereira (on loan from (France) Auxerre, previously on loan at (France) FBBP01)
4	DF	DEN	Mathias Ross (on loan from (Turkey) Galatasaray)
5	DF	NED	Youri Baas (on loan from Ajax)
6	MF	NED	Mees Hoedemakers (from Cambuur)
10	FW	NED	Sontje Hansen (from Jong Ajax)
11	FW	ESP	Rober (on loan from (Spain) Real Betis, previously on loan at (Spain) Deportivo Alavés)
12	FW	NED	Bas Dost (from Utrecht)
14	FW	NOR	Lars Olden Larsen (from (Russia) Nizhny Novgorod, previously on loan at (Sweden) Häcken)
17	DF	NED	Bram Nuytinck (from (Italy) Sampdoria)
18	FW	JPN	Koki Ogawa (on loan from (Japan) Yokohama FC)
23	MF	JPN	Kodai Sano (from (Japan) Fagiano Okayama)
25	FW	FRA	Alexis Tibidi (on loan from (France) Troyes, previously on loan at (Austria) Rheindorf Altach)

Out:

No.	Pos.	Nation	Player
1	GK	NED	Mattijs Branderhorst (to Utrecht)
2	DF	NED	Ilias Bronkhorst (to Dordrecht)
4	DF	ESP	Iván Márquez (to (Germany) 1. FC Nürnberg)
5	DF	NED	Joris Kramer (to Go Ahead Eagles)
6	MF	NED	Jordy Bruijn (to (Lebanon) Safa)
8	MF	ISL	Andri Baldursson (loan return to (Italy) Bologna)
14	MF	MAR	Oussama Tannane (to (Qatar) Umm Salal)
16	DF	MAR	Souffian El Karouani (to Utrecht)
18	FW	BEL	Mathias De Wolf (to (Belgium) OH Leuven)
19	FW	BEL	Landry Dimata (loan return to (Spain) Espanyol)
21	FW	NED	Ibrahim Cissoko (to (France) Toulouse)
34	DF	NED	Terry Lartey Sanniez (free agent)
77	FW	NED	Anthony Musaba (loan return to (France) Monaco)
—	FW	NED	Joep van der Sluijs (free agent, previously on loan at TOP Oss)
—	FW	BEL	Thibo Baeten (to (Belgium) Beerschot, previously on loan)

=== PEC Zwolle ===
In:

No.	Pos.	Nation	Player
6	DF	MAR	Anouar El Azzouzi (from Dordrecht)
7	MF	DEN	Younes Namli (from Sparta Rotterdam)
10	FW	NED	Ferdy Druijf (on loan from (Austria) Rapid Wien)
13	DF	FIN	Thomas Lam (from (Australia) Melbourne City)
15	DF	IRL	Anselmo García MacNulty (from (Germany) VfL Wolfsburg, previously on loan at NAC Breda)
16	FW	NED	Divaio Bobson (from (Germany) Eintracht Frankfurt II)
18	MF	NED	Odysseus Velanas (from NAC Breda)
19	FW	ESP	Nico Serrano (on loan from (Spain) Athletic Bilbao, previously on loan at (Spain) Mirandés)
20	DF	GER	Lennart Czyborra (on loan from (Italy) Genoa)
25	GK	NED	Kenneth Vermeer (free agent)
28	MF	NED	Zico Buurmeester (on loan from AZ)

Out:

No.	Pos.	Nation	Player
4	MF	BIH	Haris Medunjanin (to (Spain) Castellón)
5	DF	NED	Bart van Hintum (to ADO Den Haag)
6	MF	NED	Thomas van den Belt (to Feyenoord)
7	FW	CUW	Gervane Kastaneer (free agent)
10	MF	CRO	Tomislav Mrkonjić (free agent)
16	GK	NED	Jan Hoekstra (loan return to Groningen)
18	DF	NED	Jordy Tutuarima (to (Armenia) Noah)
19	DF	NED	Gabi Caschili (to Cambuur)
20	MF	MAR	Younes Taha (to Twente)
22	DF	CUW	Daijiro Chirino (to (Spain) Castellón)
23	MF	NED	Hicham Acheffay (free agent)
24	MF	NED	Melayro Bogarde (loan return to (Germany) TSG 1899 Hoffenheim)
25	MF	NED	Jimmy Kaparos (to (Germany) Schalke 04 II)
31	MF	NED	Sven Zitman (to TOP Oss)
33	DF	NED	Rav van den Berg (to (England) Middlesbrough)
34	FW	NED	Joshua Sion (free agent)
36	DF	NED	Thomas Beelen (to Feyenoord)
45	FW	NED	Chardi Landu (to Emmen)
47	DF	NOR	Håkon Gangstad (to (Norway) Ranheim)
—	FW	NED	Stijn Meijer (free agent)

=== PSV Eindhoven ===
In:

No.	Pos.	Nation	Player
6	DF	GER	Armel Bella-Kotchap (on loan from (England) Southampton)
7	FW	NED	Noa Lang (from (Belgium) Club Brugge)
8	DF	USA	Sergiño Dest (on loan from (Spain) Barcelona, previously on loan at (Italy) Milan)
10	MF	USA	Malik Tillman (on loan from (Germany) Bayern Munich, previously on loan at (Scotland) Rangers)
14	FW	USA	Ricardo Pepi (from (Germany) FC Augsburg, previously on loan at Groningen)
22	MF	NED	Jerdy Schouten (from (Italy) Bologna)
27	FW	MEX	Hirving Lozano (from (Italy) Napoli)

Out:

No.	Pos.	Nation	Player
6	MF	CIV	Ibrahim Sangaré (to (England) Nottingham Forest)
7	FW	NED	Xavi Simons (to (France) Paris Saint-Germain)
10	FW	POR	Fábio Silva (loan return to (England) Wolverhampton Wanderers)
11	FW	BEL	Thorgan Hazard (loan return to (Germany) Borussia Dortmund)
15	MF	MEX	Érick Gutiérrez (to (Mexico) Chivas)
21	FW	NED	Anwar El Ghazi (free agent)
22	DF	ENG	Jarrad Branthwaite (loan return to (England) Everton)
29	DF	AUT	Philipp Mwene (to (Germany) 1. FSV Mainz 05)
33	FW	BRA	Sávio (loan return to (France) Troyes)
—	DF	GER	Philipp Max (to (Germany) Eintracht Frankfurt, previously on loan)
—	DF	GER	Timo Baumgartl (to (Germany) Schalke 04, previously on loan at (Germany) Union Berlin)

=== RKC Waalwijk ===
In:

No.	Pos.	Nation	Player
7	FW	NED	Denilho Cleonise (from Twente)
10	FW	SRB	Filip Stevanović (on loan from (England) Manchester City, previously on loan at (Portugal) Santa Clara)
15	MF	NED	Nouri El Harmazi (from Vitesse youth)
19	FW	NED	Richonell Margaret (from TOP Oss)
20	FW	BEL	Ilias Takidine (from (Belgium) RSCA Futures)
21	GK	NED	Jeroen Houwen (from Vitesse)
22	DF	ISR	Raz Meir (from (Israel) Maccabi Haifa)
24	MF	CUW	Godfried Roemeratoe (from (Israel) Hapoel Tel Aviv)
25	DF	NED	Jeffrey Bruma (from Heerenveen)
27	MF	NED	Reuven Niemeijer (from (Italy) Brescia)
28	DF	NED	Aaron Meijers (from Sparta Rotterdam)
30	MF	FRA	Daouda Weidmann (on loan from (Italy) Torino)

Out:

No.	Pos.	Nation	Player
6	MF	CUW	Vurnon Anita (to (Saudi Arabia) Al-Orobah)
7	FW	ESP	Julen Lobete (loan return to (Spain) Celta Vigo)
9	FW	DEN	Mika Biereth (loan return to (England) Arsenal)
10	FW	SUR	Florian Jozefzoon (to (Turkey) Bandırmaspor)
11	MF	MAR	Iliass Bel Hassani (to (Saudi Arabia) Al-Jabalain)
12	DF	NED	Hans Mulder (to Unicum)
14	MF	NED	Pelle Clement (to Sparta Rotterdam)
15	DF	NED	Lars Nieuwpoort (to (Cyprus) Karmiotissa)
17	FW	NED	Roy Kuijpers (to NAC Breda)
20	FW	NED	Mats Seuntjens (to Utrecht)
21	GK	POR	Joel Pereira (free agent)
22	DF	COM	Saïd Bakari (to Sparta Rotterdam)
26	MF	BEL	Sebbe Augustijns (to Telstar)
34	DF	NED	Luuk Wouters (on loan to Eindhoven)

=== Sparta Rotterdam ===
In:

No.	Pos.	Nation	Player
—	DF	COM	Saïd Bakari (from RKC Waalwijk)
—	MF	NED	Pelle Clement (from RKC Waalwijk)
—	DF	NED	Django Warmerdam (from Utrecht)
—	DF	ESP	Sergi Rosanas (from (Spain) Barcelona Atlètic)
—	FW	USA	Agustin Anello (from (Belgium) Lommel, previously on loan at (Croatia) Hajduk Split)
—	DF	NED	Tijs Velthuis (from Jong AZ, previously on loan at NAC Breda)
—	GK	GER	Kaylen Reitmaier (from (Germany) Fortuna Düsseldorf)
—	FW	ALG	Camiel Neghli (from De Graafschap)
—	DF	SUR	Djevencio van der Kust (from Utrecht, previously on loan at (United States) Houston Dynamo)
—	MF	BRA	Metinho (on loan from Troyes, previously on loan at (Belgium) Lommel)

Out:

No.	Pos.	Nation	Player
—	DF	NED	Shurandy Sambo (loan return to PSV)
—	DF	NED	Dirk Abels (to (Switzerland) Grasshoppers)
—	DF	LUX	Mica Pinto (to Vitesse)
—	DF	NED	Adil Auassar (retired)
—	DF	NED	Aaron Meijers (to RKC Waalwijk)
—	FW	NOR	Elias Hoff Melkersen (loan return to (Scotland) Hibernian)
—	GK	NED	Tim Coremans (free agent)
—	FW	NED	Patrick Brouwer (on loan to Emmen)
—	MF	DEN	Younes Namli (to PEC Zwolle)
—	MF	NED	Jeremy van Mullem (to Cambuur)
—	FW	COD	Jason Lokilo (to (England) Hull City, previously on loan at (Turkey) İstanbulspor)

=== Twente ===
In:

No.	Pos.	Nation	Player
6	MF	NED	Carel Eiting (from Volendam)
7	FW	NED	Mitchell van Bergen (from (France) Stade Reims)
8	MF	NED	Youri Regeer (from Ajax)
10	FW	TUR	Naci Ünüvar (on loan from Ajax, previously on loan at (Turkey) Trabzonspor)
17	DF	BEL	Alec Van Hoorenbeeck (on loan from (Belgium) Mechelen)
19	MF	MAR	Younes Taha (from PEC Zwolle)
27	FW	CRC	Manfred Ugalde (from (Belgium) Lommel, previously on loan)

Out:

No.	Pos.	Nation	Player
4	DF	ESP	Julio Pleguezuelo (to (England) Plymouth Argyle)
6	MF	NED	Wout Brama (retired)
7	FW	CZE	Václav Černý (to (Germany) VfL Wolfsburg)
8	MF	ALG	Ramiz Zerrouki (to Feyenoord)
10	FW	NED	Virgil Misidjan (to (Saudi Arabia) Al-Tai)
17	DF	NED	Anass Salah-Eddine (loan return to Ajax)
26	FW	NED	Denilho Cleonise (to RKC Waalwijk)

=== Utrecht ===
In:

No.	Pos.	Nation	Player
1	GK	GRE	Vasilios Barkas (from (Scotland) Celtic, previously on loan)
6	MF	GER	Can Bozdoğan (from (Germany) Schalke 04, previously on loan)
8	MF	DEN	Oscar Fraulo (on loan from (Germany) Borussia Mönchengladbach)
11	FW	NED	Marouan Azarkan (from Feyenoord, previously on loan at Excelsior)
14	MF	IRQ	Zidane Iqbal (from (England) Manchester United)
15	FW	ENG	Adrian Blake (from (England) Watford)
16	DF	MAR	Souffian El Karouani (from NEC)
21	FW	NED	Mats Seuntjens (from RKC Waalwijk)
22	FW	ESP	Hugo Novoa (on loan from (Germany) RB Leipzig, previously on loan at (Switzerland) Basel)
27	DF	FRA	Modibo Sagnan (from (Spain) Real Sociedad, previously on loan)
31	GK	NED	Mattijs Branderhorst (from NEC)
34	DF	NED	Ryan Flamingo (on loan from (Italy) Sassuolo)
37	FW	SWE	Isac Lidberg (from Go Ahead Eagles)
77	FW	NED	Ole Romeny (from Emmen)

Out:

No.	Pos.	Nation	Player
3	DF	NED	Tommy St. Jago (to Willem II)
8	MF	NED	Luuk Brouwers (on loan to SC Heerenveen)
9	FW	GRE	Anastasios Douvikas (to (Spain) Celta Vigo)
11	FW	GER	Amin Younes (loan return to (Saudi Arabia) Ettifaq)
14	DF	NED	Ramon Hendriks (loan return to Feyenoord)
16	GK	NED	Fabian de Keijzer (to Heracles Almelo)
17	DF	SUR	Sean Klaiber (to (Denmark) Brøndby)
21	DF	NED	Django Warmerdam (to Sparta Rotterdam)
22	MF	NED	Sander van de Streek (to (Turkey) Antalyaspor)
25	DF	NED	Ruben Kluivert (to Dordrecht)
28	FW	NED	Bas Dost (to NEC)
30	FW	JPN	Naoki Maeda (loan return to (Japan) Nagoya Grampus)
31	GK	NED	Thijmen Nijhuis (free agent)
37	FW	NED	Derensili Sanches Fernandes (to Excelsior)
38	MF	EST	Rocco Robert Shein (to Dordrecht)
—	FW	NED	Remco Balk (to Cambuur, previously on loan)
—	DF	SUR	Djevencio van der Kust (to Sparta Rotterdam, previously on loan at (United States) Houston Dynamo)
—	FW	MAR	Mimoun Mahi (to De Graafschap, previously on loan at Cambuur)

=== Vitesse ===
In:

No.	Pos.	Nation	Player
1	GK	CUW	Eloy Room (from (United States) Columbus Crew)
5	DF	LUX	Mica Pinto (from Sparta Rotterdam)
7	FW	FRA	Amine Boutrah (from (France) Concarneau)
9	FW	SWE	Joel Voelkerling Persson (on loan from (Italy) Lecce)
10	FW	BIH	Said Hamulić (on loan from (France) Toulouse)
11	FW	NED	Fodé Fofana (on loan from PSV Eindhoven)
15	DF	NED	Ramon Hendriks (on loan from Feyenoord, previously on loan at Utrecht)
17	MF	POL	Kacper Kozłowski (reloan from (England) Brighton)
21	MF	NED	Mathijs Tielemans (from Jong PSV)

Out:

No.	Pos.	Nation	Player
3	DF	NED	Ryan Flamingo (loan return to (Italy) Sassuolo)
8	MF	NOR	Sondre Tronstad (to (England) Blackburn Rovers)
9	FW	NED	Mohamed Sankoh (loan return to (Germany) VfB Stuttgart)
10	FW	CRO	Gabriel Vidović (loan return to (Germany) Bayern Munich)
14	FW	POL	Bartosz Białek (loan return to (Germany) VfL Wolfsburg)
16	GK	NED	Kjell Scherpen (loan return to (England) Brighton)
18	DF	CZE	Tomáš Hájek (to (Greece) Panserraikos)
21	MF	SVK	Matúš Bero (to (Germany) VfL Bochum)
23	MF	NED	Daan Huisman (to (Norway) Haugesund)
24	GK	NED	Jeroen Houwen (to RKC Waalwijk)
27	DF	FRA	Romaric Yapi (to (France) Bastia)
32	DF	GER	Maximilian Wittek (to (Germany) VfL Bochum)
33	GK	NED	Daan Reiziger (to Cambuur)
35	DF	NED	Mitchell Dijks (to Fortuna Sittard)
60	GK	NED	Nigel van Haveren (free agent)
—	FW	DEN	Nikolai Baden Frederiksen (on loan to Austria Lustenau, previously on loan at (Hungary) Ferencváros)
—	FW	NED	Simon van Duivenbooden (on loan to (Belgium) Patro Eisden)

=== Volendam ===
In:

No.	Pos.	Nation	Player
1	GK	GER	Mio Backhaus (on loan from (Germany) Werder Bremen)
7	MF	USA	Zach Booth (on loan from (England) Leicester City U21)
8	MF	RSA	Luke Le Roux (from (Sweden) Varbergs BoIS)
14	FW	AUS	Garang Kuol (on loan from (England) Newcastle United, previously on loan at (Scotland) Hearts)

Out:

No.	Pos.	Nation	Player
1	GK	SRB	Filip Stanković (loan return to (Italy) Inter Milan)
5	DF	ENG	Derry Murkin (to (Germany) Schalke 04)
8	MF	NED	Carel Eiting (to Twente)
9	FW	NED	Henk Veerman (on loan to ADO Den Haag)
10	MF	ITA	Gaetano Oristanio (loan return to (Italy) Inter Milan)
12	MF	FRA	Florent Da Silva (loan return to (France) Lyon)
15	DF	NED	Dean James (to Go Ahead Eagles)
19	MF	BEL	Francesco Antonucci (loan return to Feyenoord)
33	MF	NED	Walid Ould-Chikh (on loan to Roda JC)
36	FW	NED	Jordi Blom (to Quick Boys)

== See also ==
- 2023–24 Eredivisie
