= 2021–22 RKC Waalwijk season =

RKC Waalwijk
2021–22 season
- Chairman: Peter Konijnenburg
- Head coach: Joseph Oosting
- Stadium: Mandemakers Stadion
- Eredivisie: 10th
- KNVB Cup: Quarter-finals
- Top goalscorer: League: Michiel Kramer (11); All: Jens Odgaard; Michiel Kramer (11 each)
- Highest home attendance: 6,389 vs. FC Utrecht, 2 April 2022
- Lowest home attendance: 2,126 vs. Feyenoord, 13 February 2022
- Average home league attendance: 3,923
- Biggest win: 3–1 vs. FC Groningen (H), 1 May 2022; 3–1 vs. AZ (A), 15 May 2022
- Biggest defeat: 0–5 vs. Ajax (H), 21 November 2021
Home colours	Away colours	Third colours

The 2021–22 season was the 82nd season in the existence of RKC Waalwijk and the club's third consecutive season in the top flight of Dutch football. In addition to the domestic league, RKC Waalwijk participated in this season's editions of the KNVB Cup.

== Players ==
=== First-team squad ===
As of 31 January 2022

Note: Flags indicate national team as defined under FIFA eligibility rules; some limited exceptions apply. Players may hold more than one non-FIFA nationality.

No.	Pos.	Nation	Player
1	GK	NED	Etienne Vaessen
2	DF	CUW	Juriën Gaari
3	DF	NED	Melle Meulensteen (captain)
4	DF	BEL	Shawn Adewoye
5	DF	BEL	Thierry Lutonda
6	MF	CUW	Vurnon Anita
7	FW	DEN	Jens Odgaard (on loan from Sassuolo)
8	MF	GER	Ayman Azhil (on loan from Bayer Leverkusen)
9	FW	NED	Finn Stokkers
10	MF	NED	Richard van der Venne
11	MF	MAR	Iliass Bel Hassani
12	MF	NED	Hans Mulder
13	GK	NED	Mark Spenkelink
14	MF	NED	Achraf El Bouchataoui (on loan from Feyenoord)

No.	Pos.	Nation	Player
15	DF	NED	Lars Nieuwpoort
17	FW	NED	Roy Kuijpers
20	MF	BEL	Lennerd Daneels
21	GK	POR	Joel Castro Pereira
22	FW	COM	Saïd Bakari
24	DF	BEL	Dario Van den Buijs
26	MF	BEL	Sebbe Augustijns
27	FW	NED	David Min
28	DF	NED	Alexander Büttner
29	FW	NED	Michiel Kramer
31	GK	MAR	Issam El Maach
33	MF	NED	Yassin Oukili
34	DF	NED	Luuk Wouters
59	DF	ALG	Ahmed Touba

== Pre-season and friendlies ==
Win Draw Loss

3 July 2021 Friendly	Go Ahead Eagles (Netherlands)	1–1	(Netherlands) RKC Waalwijk	Netherlands
18:30 CEST (UTC+2)
Note: three halves of 30 minutes.

17 July 2021 Friendly	N.E.C. (Netherlands)	3–0	(Netherlands) RKC Waalwijk	Netherlands
17:00 CEST (UTC+2)
Note: three halves of 30 minutes.

23 July 2021 Friendly	Roda JC (Netherlands)	2–4	(Netherlands) RKC Waalwijk	Netherlands
16:30 CEST (UTC+2)

30 July 2021 Friendly	Heracles Almelo (Netherlands)	4–1	(Netherlands) RKC Waalwijk	Almelo, Netherlands
18:45 CEST (UTC+2)	Başaçıkoğlu 34'; Vloet 59'; Kiomourtzoglou 73'; Quagliata (red card) 90'; Fadiga 90+3'		Bakari 83'; Gaari (red card) 90'	Stadium: Erve Asito

7 August 2021 Friendly	RKC Waalwijk (Netherlands)	4–2	(Belgium) Lommel	Waalwijk, Netherlands
16:30 CEST (UTC+2)				Stadium: Mandemakers Stadion

23 March 2022 Friendly	Feyenoord (Netherlands)	3–3	(Netherlands) RKC Waalwijk	Rotterdam, Netherlands
18:00 CET (UTC+1)				Stadium: Stadion Feijenoord

== Competitions ==
=== Overall record ===
Competition	First match	Last match	Starting round	Final position	Record							
Competition	First match	Last match	Starting round	Final position	Pld	W	D	L	GF	GA	GD	Win %
Eredivisie	14 August 2021	15 May 2021	Matchday 1	Matchday 34	34	9	11	14	40	51	−11	26.47
KNVB Cup	15 December 2021	9 February 2022	Second round	Quarter-finals	3	2	0	1	9	6	+3	66.67
Total					37	11	11	15	49	57	−8	29.73

Last updated: 11 May 2022
Source: Soccerway

=== Eredivisie ===
==== League table ====
Pos	Team	Pld	W	D	L	GF	GA	GD	Pts	Qualification or relegation
8	Heerenveen	34	11	8	15	37	50	−13	41	Qualification for the European competition play-offs
9	Cambuur	34	11	6	17	53	70	−17	39	
10	RKC Waalwijk	34	9	11	14	40	51	−11	38	
11	NEC	34	10	8	16	38	52	−14	38	
12	Groningen	34	9	9	16	41	55	−14	36	

Source: Eredivisie
Rules for classification: Season in progress: 1) Most points won; 2) Less points lost; 3) Goal difference; 4) Goals scored; 5) Alphabetical order; End of season: 1) Points; 2) Goal difference; 3) Goals scored; 4) Head-to-head points; 5) Head-to-head goal difference; 6) Head-to-head away goals scored; 7) Play-off if relevant for deciding champion, relegation or participating in a European league, otherwise by draw. 8) Penalty shoot-out (only after a play-off)

==== Results summary ====
Overall								Home						Away					
Pld	W	D	L	GF	GA	GD	Pts	W	D	L	GF	GA	GD	W	D	L	GF	GA	GD
34	9	11	14	40	51	−11	38	6	3	8	17	25	−8	3	8	6	23	26	−3

Last updated: 11 May 2022.
Source: Eredivisie

==== Results by round ====
Round	1	2	3	4	5	6	7	8	9	10	11	12	13	14	15	16	17	18	19	20	21	22	23	24	25	26	27	28	29	30	31	32	33	34
Ground	H	A	A	H	A	H	A	H	A	H	H	A	H	A	H	A	H	A	A	H	A	H	A	H	A	H	A	H	A	H	H	A	H	A
Result	W	L	D	L	D	L	L	D	D	W	L	D	L	D	W	L	L	D	W	W	L	L	D	L	L	D	W	D	L	L	W	D	W	W
Position	8	8	9	12	13	14	15	14	15	13	14	13	15	15	14	14	15	15	14	12	12	13	13	14	14	15	14	14	14	15	14	14	13	10

Updated to match(es) played on 11 May 2022. Source: Eredivisie
A = Away; H = Home; W = Win; D = Draw; L = Loss

==== Matches ====
The league fixtures were announced on 11 June 2021.

14 August 2021 1	RKC Waalwijk	1–0	AZ	Waalwijk
16:30 CEST (UTC+2)	Kramer 44'	Report	Guðmundsson (yellow card) 75'; Sugawara (yellow card) 89'	Stadium: Mandemakers Stadion; Attendance: 3,860; Referee: Joey Kooij

21 August 2021 2	SC Heerenveen	3–2	RKC Waalwijk	Heerenveen
18:45 CEST (UTC+2)	H. Veerman 14' (pen.), 44'; Halilović 31'; van Ewijk (yellow card) 76'	Report	Touba (yellow card) 13'; van der Venne (yellow card) 43'; Kramer (yellow card) 50'; Odgaard 68'; van der Venne 89'	Stadium: Abe Lenstra Stadion; Attendance: 13,600; Referee: Marc Nagtegaal

27 August 2021 3	Fortuna Sittard	2–2	RKC Waalwijk	Sittard
20:00 CEST (UTC+2)	S. Baghdadi 23'; Seuntjens 68'; Angha (yellow card) 71'	Report	Kramer 38', 58'; Odgaard (yellow card) 12'	Stadium: Fortuna Sittard Stadion; Attendance: 6,470; Referee: Jeroen Manschot

12 September 2021 4	RKC Waalwijk	1–2	Vitesse	Waalwijk
CEST (UTC+2)	Büttner (yellow card) 21'; Bakari 27'; Kramer (yellow card) 30'; van der Venne (yellow card) 50'; Vaessen (yellow card) 89'	Report	Doeki 8'; Gboho 54'; Wittek (yellow card) 77'	Stadium: Mandemakers Stadion; Attendance: 4,989; Referee: Jochem Kamphuis

18 September 2021 5	FC Utrecht	2–2	RKC Waalwijk	Utrecht
21:00 CEST (UTC+2)	Gustafson 4'; Janssen (yellow card) 27'; Douvikas 52' (pen.)	Report	Odgaard (penalty missed) 8', 20'; Büttner 45'; Kramer (yellow card) 69'; Vaessen (yellow card) 90+4'; Daneels (yellow card) 90+6'	Stadium: Stadion Galgenwaard; Attendance: 16,000; Referee: Richard Martens

21 September 2021 6	RKC Waalwijk	1–2	Willem II	Waalwijk
21:00 CEST (UTC+2)	Büttner (yellow card) 14'; Touba (yellow card) 79'; Meulensteen 90+4'	Report	Wriedt 52'; Köhlert 60'	Stadium: Mandemakers Stadion; Attendance: 5,975; Referee: Dennis Higler

26 September 2021 7	Heracles Almelo	1–0	RKC Waalwijk	Almelo
16:45 CEST(UTC+2)	Burgzorg 59'	Report	Gaari (yellow card) 23'	Stadium: Erve Asito; Attendance: 10,035; Referee: Bas Nijhuis

2 October 2021 8	RKC Waalwijk	1–1	Go Ahead Eagles	Waalwijk
18:45	Büttner 60' (pen.); M. Kramer (yellow card) 77'; Bakari (yellow card) 81'	Report	I. Córdoba 15'; Idzes (yellow card) 22'; J. Kramer (yellow card) 58'; Lucassen (yellow card) 77'; Lidberg (yellow card) 86'	Stadium: Mandemakers Stadion; Attendance: 6,018; Referee: Erwin Blank

16 October 2021 9	Feyenoord	2–2	RKC Waalwijk	Rotterdam
16:30 CEST (UTC+2)	Toornstra 34'; Til 47'; Nelson (yellow card) 90+10'; Aursnes (yellow card) 90+10'	Report	37' Odgaard; 45+1' Anita; Touba (yellow card) 90+10'; H. Mulder (yellow card) 90+10'	Stadium: De Kuip; Attendance: 47,183; Referee: Pol van Boekel

23 October 2021 10	RKC Waalwijk	1–0	Sparta Rotterdam	Waalwijk
21:00 CEST (UTC+2)	Kramer 89'	Report	Beugelsdijk (yellow card) 90+3'	Stadium: Mandemakers Stadion; Attendance: 5,304; Referee: Jeroen Manschot

31 October 2021 11	RKC Waalwijk	0–1	SC Cambuur	Waalwijk
16:45 CEST (UTC+2)	Meulensteen (yellow card) 24'; Vaessen (yellow card) 90+4'	Report	Maulun (penalty missed) 10, (yellow card) 67'; Kallon 63'	Stadium: Mandemakers Stadion; Attendance: 4,754; Referee: Edwin de Graaf

7 November 2021 12	FC Groningen	1–1	RKC Waalwijk	Groningen
12:15 CET (UTC+1)	Larsen 85'; van Hintum (yellow card) 90'	Report	Kramer 14'; Touba (yellow card) 34'	Stadium: Euroborg; Attendance: 20,313; Referee: Kevin Blom

21 November 2021 13	RKC Waalwijk	0–5	Ajax	Waalwijk
16:45 CET (UTC+1)	Gaari (yellow card) 85'	Report	Haller 17', 83'; Berghuis 42', 57'; Timber 74'	Stadium: Mandemakers Stadion; Attendance: 0 Referee: Allard Lindhout

27 November 2021 14	PEC Zwolle	0–0	RKC Waalwijk	Zwolle
20:00 CET (UTC+1)	Kersten (yellow card) 22'; Redan (penalty missed) 61	Report	Kramer (yellow card) 23'; Touba (yellow card) 59'	Stadium: MAC³PARK Stadion; Attendance: 0 Referee: Joey Kooij

5 December 2021 15	RKC Waalwijk	2–1	N.E.C.	Waalwijk
12:15 CET (UTC+1)	Odgaard 28'; Augustijns (yellow card) 54'; Adewoye (yellow card) 62'; Azhil (yellow card) 90'; Kuijpers 90+4'	Report	Bruijn 16'; I. Márquez (yellow card) 47'; Odenthal (yellow card) 65'; Verdonk (yellow card) 84'	Stadium: Mandemakers Stadion; Attendance: 0 Referee: Dennis Higler

12 December 2021 16	FC Twente	2–1	RKC Waalwijk	Enschede
12:15 CET (UTC+1)	van Wolfswinkel 2'; Vlap 5'	Report	Odgaard 10'; Adewoye (red card) 89'	Stadium: De Grolsch Veste; Attendance: 0 Referee: Pol van Boekel

19 December 2021 17	RKC Waalwijk	1–4	PSV	Waalwijk
16:45 CET (UTC+1)	Meulensteen (yellow card) 51'; Odgaard 79'	Report	Vertessen 34', 72'; Gakpo 52' (pen.); Mwene 60'	Stadium: Mandemakers Stadion; Attendance: 0 Referee: Jeroen Manschot

23 December 2021 18	Sparta Rotterdam	1–1	RKC Waalwijk	Rotterdam
21:00 CET(UTC+1)	Vriends (yellow card) 33'; van Crooij 39'; Auassar (yellow card) 41'	Report	Büttner (yellow card) 8'; Odgaard 27'; Anita (yellow card) 90'	Stadium: Sparta Stadion Het Kasteel; Attendance: 0 Referee: Edwin van de Graaf

15 January 2022 19	Go Ahead Eagles	0–2	RKC Waalwijk	Deventer
21:00 CET(UTC+1)	Lidberg (yellow card) 30'; Kuipers (yellow card) 87'	Report	Büttner (yellow card) 19'; Stokkers 21'; Kramer 34'; Gaari (yellow card) 86'	Stadium: De Adelaarshorst; Attendance: 0 Referee: Sander van der Eijk

23 January 2022 20	RKC Waalwijk	2–1	Fortuna Sittard	Waalwijk
20:00 CET(UTC+1)	Gaari 2'; Kramer 19', (yellow card) 64'; Adewoye (yellow card) 52'	Report	R. Janssen (yellow card) 23'; Tirpan (yellow card) 45+2'; M. Seuntjens 65' (pen.); Pinto (yellow card) 90'; Rienstra (yellow card) 90+1'	Stadium: Mandemakers Stadion; Attendance: 0 Referee: Serdar Gözübüyük

6 February 2022 21	Willem II	3–1	RKC Waalwijk	Tilburg
14:30 CET(UTC+1)	Oosting 8', 13'; Hornkamp 43'	Report	Büttner (yellow card) 65'; Kramer 71'; van der Venne 86'	Stadium: Koning Willem II Stadion; Attendance: 4,686; Referee: Bas Nijhuis

13 February 2022 22	RKC Waalwijk	0–2	Feyenoord	Waalwijk
14:30 CET(UTC+1)		Report	45' Kökçü; 89' Hendrix	Stadium: Mandemakers Stadion; Attendance: 2,126; Referee: Jeroen Manschot

19 February 2022 23	N.E.C.	1–1	RKC Waalwijk	Nijmegen
16:30 CET (UTC+1)	Odenthal (yellow card) 79'; Okita 88'; Schöne (yellow card) 90+1'	Report	van der Venne 18'; Büttner (yellow card) 71'; Touba (yellow card) 90+1'; Gaari (yellow card) 90+1'	Stadium: Goffertstadion; Attendance: 11,802; Referee: Erwin Blank

25 February 2022 24	RKC Waalwijk	1–2	FC Twente	Waalwijk
20:00 CET (UTC+1)	van der Venne (yellow card) 43'; Odgaard 74'; Bel Hassani (yellow card) 86'	Report	van Wolfswinkel 23'; Brenet (yellow card) 44'; Bruns (yellow card) 87'; Limnios 90'	Stadium: Mandemakers Stadion; Attendance: 5,364; Referee: Martin Pérez

6 March 2022 25	Ajax	3–2	RKC Waalwijk	Amsterdam
16:45 CET (UTC+1)	Martínez (yellow card) 15'; Haller 33', 37'; Rensch (yellow card) 53'; Tadić 90' (pen.), (yellow card) 90+4'	Report	Kramer 50'; Van der Venne 57'; Anita (yellow card) 90+3'	Stadium: Johan Cruyff Arena (roof open); Attendance: 53,467; Referee: Dennis Higler

12 March 2022 26	RKC Waalwijk	0–0	SC Heerenveen	Waalwijk
21:00 CET (UTC+1)	Gaari (yellow card) 35'; Anita (yellow card) 78'; Kuijpers (yellow card) 90+5'	Report	van Beek (yellow card) 47'; Haye (yellow card) 90+3'	Stadium: Mandemakers Stadion; Attendance: 4,203; Referee: Jeroen Manschot

20 March 2022 27	Vitesse	1–2	RKC Waalwijk	Arnhem
16:45 CET (UTC+1)	Openda 6'; Wittek (yellow card) 74'	Report	Meulensteen 15'; Büttner 51'; Odgaard (yellow card) 90'	Stadium: GelreDome; Attendance: 13,625; Referee: Joey Kooij

2 April 2022 28	RKC Waalwijk	1–1	Utrecht	Waalwijk
20:00 CEST (UTC+2)	Kramer 90+2'	Report	Timber 34'	Stadium: Mandemakers Stadion; Attendance: 6,389; Referee: Marc Nagtegaal

10 April 2022 29	PSV	2–0	RKC Waalwijk	Eindhoven
14:30 CEST (UTC+2)	J. Veerman 38'; Ramalho (yellow card) 44'; Teze 69'; Carlos Vinícius (yellow card) 72'; Boscagli (yellow card) 75'	Report	Kramer (yellow card) 45'; Gaari (yellow card) 51'; Adewoye (yellow card) 90+3'	Stadium: Philips Stadion; Attendance: 33,000; Referee: Rob Dieperink

23 April 2022 30	RKC Waalwijk	0–2	PEC Zwolle	Waalwijk
20:00 CEST (UTC+2)	Adewoye (yellow card) 41'; Kramer (yellow card) 52'	Report	van den Belt 16'; van Polen 50', (yellow card) 71'	Stadium: Mandemakers Stadion; Attendance: 5,236; Referee: Jochem Kamphuis

1 May 2022 31	RKC Waalwijk	3–1	FC Groningen	Waalwijk
20:00 CEST (UTC+2)	Stokkers 16', 25'; van der Venne 39'	Report	Kasanwirjo (yellow card) 21'; Larsen 58'	Stadium: Mandemakers Stadion; Attendance: 6,348; Referee: Serdar Gözübüyük

6 May 2022 32	SC Cambuur	1–1	RKC Waalwijk	Leeuwarden
20:00 CEST (UTC+2)	Hoedemakers (yellow card) 76'; M. Smit 90+5'	Report	Adewoye (yellow card) 24'; Schmidt 72' (o.g.)	Stadium: Cambuur Stadion; Attendance: 10,000; Referee: Joey Kooij

11 May 2022 33	RKC Waalwijk	2–0	Heracles Almelo	Waalwijk
20:00 CEST (UTC+2)	Kramer 20'; van der Venne 59'; Oukili (yellow card) 76'; Touba (yellow card) 90'	Report		Stadium: Mandemakers Stadion; Attendance: 6,126; Referee: Marc Nagtegaal

15 May 2022 34	AZ Alkmaar	1–3	RKC Waalwijk	Alkmaar
14:30 CEST (UTC+2)	de Wit 45+2'	Report	Stokkers 18'; Gaari 64'; Kuijpers 79'	Stadium: AFAS Stadion; Attendance: 17,568; Referee: Sander van der Eijk
