= Spenkelink =

Spenkelink is a Dutch surname. Notable people with the surname include:

- John Spenkelink (1949–1979), American murderer and robber
- Mark Spenkelink (born 1997), Dutch footballer
