= Ahmed Touba =

Algerian footballer (born 1998)

Personal information
- Date of birth: 13 March 1998 (age 28)
- Place of birth: Roubaix, France
- Height: 1.90 m (6 ft 3 in)
- Position: Centre-back

Team information
- Current team: Le Havre (on loan from Panathinaikos)
- Number: 5

Youth career
- –2014: Zulte Waregem
- 2014–2017: Club Brugge

Senior career*
Years	Team	Apps	(Gls)
2016–2020	Club Brugge	8	(0)
2018–2019	→ OH Leuven (loan)	9	(0)
2019–2020	→ Beroe (loan)	16	(0)
2020–2022	Waalwijk	60	(3)
2022–2025	İstanbul Başakşehir	25	(0)
2023–2024	→ Lecce (loan)	6	(0)
2024–2025	→ Mechelen (loan)	25	(2)
2025–	Panathinaikos	22	(0)
2026–	→ Le Havre (loan)	10	(0)

International career^{‡}
2016	Belgium U18	1	(0)
2016	Belgium U19	6	(0)
2020	Belgium U21	3	(0)
2021–	Algeria	18	(1)
- * Club domestic league appearances and goals as of 22 November 2026 ‡ National team caps and goals as of 14 November 2026 (UTC)

Ahmed Touba (Arabic: أحمد توبة; born 13 March 1998) is a professional footballer who plays as a centre-back for Ligue 1 side Le Havre on loan from Super League Greece club Panathinaikos. Born in France, he plays for the Algeria national team.

== Club career ==
Touba is a youth exponent from Brugge. He made his senior debut on 1 May 2017 in the Belgian Pro League against SV Zulte Waregem as a substitute for José Izquierdo after 80 minutes.

On 30 June 2022, Touba signed a three-year contract with İstanbul Başakşehir, with an additional optional year.

On 4 September 2024, Touba moved on loan to Mechelen in Belgium, with an option to buy.

== International career ==
Born in France, Touba is Algerian by descent. He moved to Belgium at a young age, and was a youth international for Belgium. He represented the Algeria national team in a friendly 4–1 win over Mauritania on 3 June 2021.

In December 2023, he was named in Algeria's squad for the 2023 Africa Cup of Nations.

== Career statistics ==
=== Club ===
As of match played 18 October 2026

Appearances and goals by club, season and competition
Club	Season	League			Cup (Note: Includes Belgian Cup, Bulgarian Cup, KNVB Cup, Turkish Cup, Coppa Italia, Greek Cup)		Continental		Other		Total	
Club	Season	Division	Apps	Goals	Apps	Goals	Apps	Goals	Apps	Goals	Apps	Goals
Club Brugge	2016–17	Belgian Pro League	0	0	0	0	—		5 (Note: Appearance(s) in Belgian Pro League Play-offs)	0	5	0
Club Brugge	2017–18	Belgian Pro League	2	0	0	0	2 (Note: Appearance(s) in UEFA Champions League)	0	1	0	5	0
Club Brugge	Total		2	0	0	0	2	0	6	0	10	0
OH Leuven (loan)	2018–19	Challenger Pro League	9	0	0	0	—		—		9	0
Beroe Stara Zagora (loan)	2019–20	Bulgarian First League	14	0	2	0	—		2 (Note: Appearance(s) in Parva Liga Championship Group)	0	18	0
Waalwijk	2020–21	Eredivisie	32	3	1	0	—		—		33	3
Waalwijk	2021–22	Eredivisie	28	0	1	0	—		—		29	0
Waalwijk	Total		60	3	2	0	—		—		62	3
İstanbul Başakşehir	2022–23	Süper Lig	24	0	5	0	10 (Note: Appearance(s) in UEFA Conference League)	1	—		39	1
İstanbul Başakşehir	2023–24	Süper Lig	1	0	0	0	—		—		1	0
İstanbul Başakşehir	Total		25	0	5	0	10	1	—		40	1
Lecce (loan)	2023–24	Serie A	6	0	1	0	—		—		7	0
Mechelen (loan)	2024–25	Belgian Pro League	23	2	2	0	—		2 (Note: Appearance(s) in Belgian Pro League European Play-offs)	0	27	2
Panathinaikos	2025–26	Super League Greece	22	0	2	0	16 (Note: Two appearances in UEFA Champions League, fourteen appearances in UEFA Europa League)	0	—		40	0
Panathinaikos	2026–27	Super League Greece	0	0	0	0	3	0	—		3	0
Panathinaikos	Total		22	0	2	0	19	0	—		43	0
Le Havre (loan)	2026–27	Ligue 1	6	0	0	0	—		—		6	0
Career total			166	5	14	0	31	0	10	0	221	6

=== International ===
As of match played 6 October 2026

Appearances and goals by national team and year
National team	Year	Apps	Goals
Algeria	2021	2	0
Algeria	2022	7	1
Algeria	2023	4	0
Algeria	2024	1	0
Algeria	2025	2	0
Algeria	2026	1	0
Total		17	1

Scores and results list Algeria's goal tally first, score column indicates score after each Touba goal.

List of international goals scored by Ahmed Touba
No.	Date	Venue	Opponent	Score	Result	Competition
1	29 March 2022	Mustapha Tchaker Stadium, Blida, Algeria	Cameroon	1–1	1–2	2022 FIFA World Cup qualification

== Honours ==
Club Brugge

- Belgian Pro League: 2017–18, runner-up 2016–17

İstanbul Başakşehir

- Turkish Cup: runner-up 2023
