= Sebbe Augustijns =

Belgian footballer (born 1999)

Personal information
- Date of birth: 3 September 1999 (age 27)
- Place of birth: Brasschaat, Antwerp, Belgium
- Height: 1.79 m (5 ft 10 in)
- Position: Midfielder

Team information
- Current team: Nieuwmoer
- Number: 24

Youth career
- 2005–2009: Achterbroek
- 2009–2010: Willem II
- 2010–2013: Beerschot
- 2013–2014: Waasland-Beveren
- 2014–2019: KV Mechelen
- 2019–2020: RKC Waalwijk

Senior career*
Years	Team	Apps	(Gls)
2020–2023	RKC Waalwijk	18	(0)
2023	Telstar	19	(0)
2024–2025	Lyra-Lierse	37	(1)
2025–	Nieuwmoer	10	(0)
- * Club domestic league appearances and goals as of 10:34, 18 November 2026 (UTC)

Sebbe Augustijns (born 3 September 1999) is a Belgian footballer who plays as a midfielder for Belgian Division 3 club Nieuwmoer.

== Club career ==
=== RKC Waalwijk ===
Born in Brasschaat, Antwerp, Belgium, Augustijns played youth football for Achterbroek, Willem II, Beerschot and Waasland-Beveren before playing for KV Mechelen between 2014 and 2019. He left KV Mechelen in summer 2019 and subsequently signed for RKC Waalwijk. He made his debut for Waalwijk on 28 October 2020, starting in a 2–2 KNVB Cup draw with SC Cambuur before being substituted with 15 minutes remaining. He made his Eredivisie debut for Waalwijk as a substitute in a 1–1 draw away to sc Heerenveen on 14 January 2021. In March 2021, Augustijns signed a two-year contract extension with RKC, keeping him at the club until 2023.

On 15 December 2021, Augustijns suffered a fracture in his left fibula in the 41st minute of a cup match against Harkemase Boys, which required surgery and kept him sidelined for several months. He returned to the pitch on 15 May 2022, replacing Vurnon Anita in the 83rd minute of a 3–1 away league victory against AZ.

Augustijns left RKC in 2023, after making 22 total appearances for the club in three years. He failed to become a starter during his time at the club, and expressed that he wanted to seek playing time elsewhere.

=== Telstar ===
On 29 June 2023, Augustijns signed a one-year contract with Eerste Divisie club Telstar, with an option to extend by another season. He made his debut for the club on 14 August, starting in a 1–0 league loss on the opening day of the season to Jong PSV.

Augustijns announced his retirement from professional football in January 2024, choosing instead to focus on a civil career in his in-laws' company. Next to his civil career, he wanted to continue playing amateur football.

=== Amateur years ===
On 24 January 2024, Augustijns signed a contract with Belgian fourth-tier Belgian Division 2 club Lyra-Lierse until the end of the 2023–24 season, with an option for the 2024–25 season.

In 2025, Augustijns moved to Nieuwmoer.

== Career statistics ==
As of match played 12 May 2024

Appearances and goals by club, season and competition
Club	Season	League			National cup		Other		Total	
Club	Season	Division	Apps	Goals	Apps	Goals	Apps	Goals	Apps	Goals
RKC Waalwijk	2020–21	Eredivisie	8	0	1	0	—		9	0
RKC Waalwijk	2021–22	Eredivisie	4	0	2	0	—		6	0
RKC Waalwijk	2022–23	Eredivisie	6	0	1	0	—		7	0
RKC Waalwijk	Total		18	0	4	0	—		22	0
Telstar	2023–24	Eerste Divisie	19	0	1	0	—		20	0
Lyra-Lierse	2023–24	Belgian Division 2	12	0	—		1 (Note: Appearances in Belgian Division 2 promotion play-offs)	0	13	0
Career total			49	0	5	0	1	0	55	0
