= Etienne Vaessen =

Surinamese footballer (born 1995)

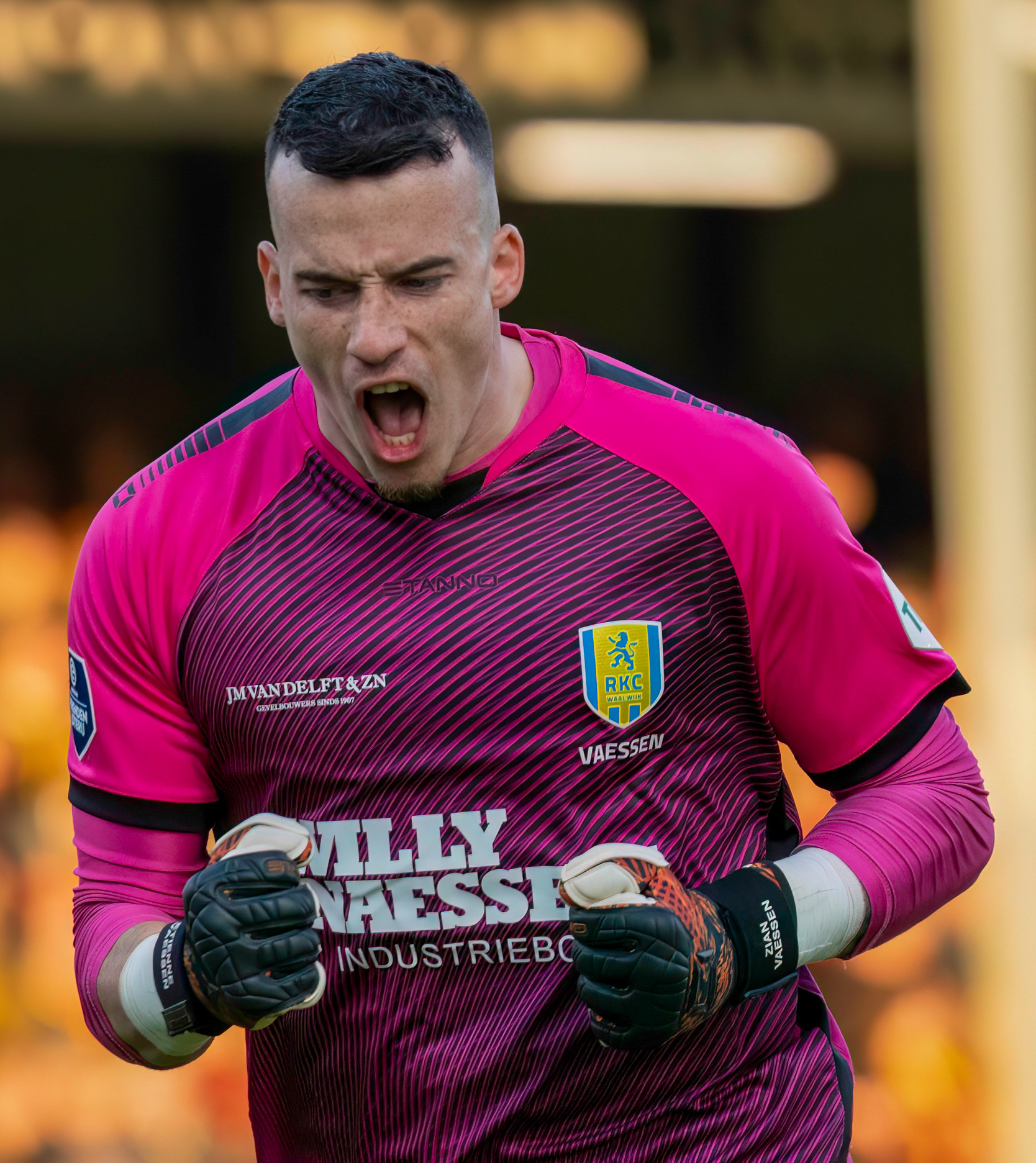
- Vaessen with RKC Waalwijk in 2023

Personal information
- Full name: Etienne Vaessen Burnet
- Date of birth: 26 July 1995 (age 31)
- Place of birth: Breda, Netherlands
- Height: 1.87 m (6 ft 2 in)
- Position: Goalkeeper

Team information
- Current team: Groningen
- Number: 1

Youth career
- SAB
- –2013: BSV Boeimeer
- 2013–2015: WSC

Senior career*
Years	Team	Apps	(Gls)
2015–2024	RKC Waalwijk	196	(0)
2024–	Groningen	73	(0)

International career^{‡}
2024–	Suriname	17	(0)
- * Club domestic league appearances and goals as of 13:20, 10 November 2026 (UTC) ‡ National team caps and goals as of 13:20, 10 November 2026 (UTC)

Etienne Vaessen Burnet (born 26 July 1995) is a professional footballer who plays as a goalkeeper for Eredivisie club Groningen. Born in the Netherlands, he plays for the Suriname national team.

== Club career ==
=== RKC Waalwijk ===
Etienne Vaessen was born on 26 July 1995 in Breda. Initially playing at amateur level, he joined professional club RKC Waalwijk in 2015 at age 20. He made his professional debut in the Eerste Divisie for RKC on 12 August 2016 in a game against FC Emmen. There, he came on as a substitute in the 22nd minute for the injured Tamati Williams.

On 28 May 2019, Vaessen won promotion to the Eredivisie with RKC after a season finale showdown against Go Ahead Eagles, which ended in a 5–4 win.

=== Groningen ===
On 26 June 2024, Vaessen signed a three-year contract with an option for an additional year with newly promoted Eredivisie club Groningen.

== International career ==
Vaessen was born and raised in the Netherlands, but has Surinamese roots via his grandfather with the name of Burnet. On 4 April 2024 Vaessen announced in an interview with ESPN that talks were ongoing with the Surinamese Football Association to play for Suriname on international level, following an interview with Suriname national team manager Stanley Menzo on 1 April.

Vaessen made his debut on 5 June 2024 in a World Cup qualifier against Saint Vincent and the Grenadines at the Dr. Ir. Franklin Essed Stadion, as Suriname won 4–1.

== Personal life ==
Vaessen is part Amerindian descent, through his grandfather.

While working as a guard for MediaMarkt and playing amateur football in 2014, Vaessen was stabbed while chasing a shoplifter, leaving him hospitalised for days.

== Career statistics ==
=== Club ===
As of match played 8 November 2026

Appearances and goals by club, season and competition
Club	Season	League			KNVB Cup		Other		Total	
Club	Season	Division	Apps	Goals	Apps	Goals	Apps	Goals	Apps	Goals
RKC Waalwijk	2015–16	Eerste Divisie	0	0	0	0	—		0	0
RKC Waalwijk	2016–17	Eerste Divisie	8	0	0	0	1	0	9	0
RKC Waalwijk	2017–18	Eerste Divisie	36	0	3	0	—		39	0
RKC Waalwijk	2018–19	Eerste Divisie	35	0	3	0	6	0	44	0
RKC Waalwijk	2019–20	Eredivisie	24	0	1	0	—		25	0
RKC Waalwijk	2020–21	Eredivisie	0	0	0	0	—		0	0
RKC Waalwijk	2021–22	Eredivisie	31	0	0	0	—		31	0
RKC Waalwijk	2022–23	Eredivisie	32	0	0	0	—		32	0
RKC Waalwijk	2023–24	Eredivisie	30	0	0	0	—		30	0
RKC Waalwijk	Total		196	0	7	0	7	0	210	0
Groningen	2024–25	Eredivisie	32	0	0	0	—		32	0
Groningen	2025–26	Eredivisie	29	0	1	0	1	0	31	0
Groningen	2026–27	Eredivisie	12	0	1	0	—		13	0
Groningen	Total		73	0	2	0	1	0	76	0
Career total			269	0	9	0	8	0	286	0

=== International ===
As of match played 28 September 2026

Appearances and goals by national team and year
National team	Year	Apps	Goals
Suriname	2024	6	0
Suriname	2025	8	0
Suriname	2026	3	0
Total		17	0

== Honours ==
Individual

- Eredivisie Team of the Month: August 2024
