= Joel Castro Pereira =

Swiss footballer (born 1996)

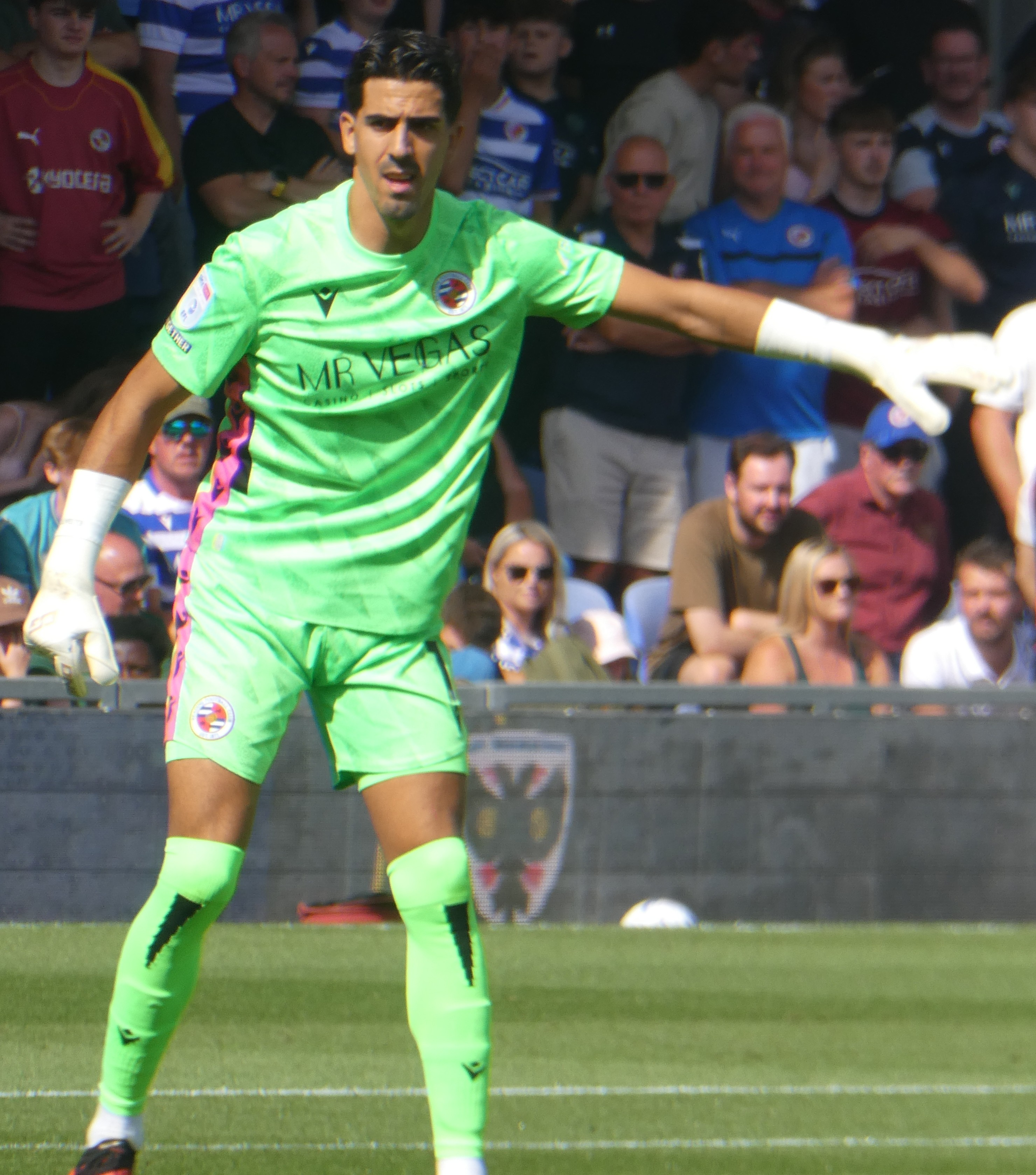
- Pereira playing for Reading in 2026

Personal information
- Full name: Joel Dinis Castro Pereira
- Date of birth: 28 June 1996 (age 30)
- Place of birth: Boudevilliers, Switzerland
- Height: 1.88 m (6 ft 2 in)
- Position: Goalkeeper

Team information
- Current team: Reading
- Number: 1

Youth career
- FC Le Locle
- –2012: Neuchâtel Xamax
- 2012–2015: Manchester United

Senior career*
Years	Team	Apps	(Gls)
2015–2021	Manchester United	1	(0)
2015–2016	→ Rochdale (loan)	6	(0)
2016–2017	→ Belenenses (loan)	8	(0)
2018–2019	→ Vitória de Setúbal (loan)	9	(0)
2019	→ Kortrijk (loan)	0	(0)
2019–2020	→ Hearts (loan)	20	(0)
2020–2021	→ Huddersfield Town (loan)	2	(0)
2021–2023	RKC Waalwijk	4	(0)
2023–	Reading	103	(0)

International career
2011	Switzerland U15	2	(0)
2011–2012	Switzerland U16	5	(0)
2012–2013	Portugal U17	5	(0)
2013–2014	Portugal U18	3	(0)
2014–2015	Portugal U19	7	(0)
2016	Portugal U20	4	(0)
2016–2018	Portugal U21	16	(0)
- * Club domestic league appearances and goals as of 14:16, 22 October 2026 (UTC)

Joel Dinis Castro Pereira (Portuguese pronunciation: [ʒuˈɛl diˈniʃ ˈkaʃtɾu pɨˈɾɐjɾɐ]; born 28 June 1996) is a professional footballer who plays as a goalkeeper for EFL League One club Reading.

Pereira joined Manchester United's youth system in 2012. He made three first-team appearances for the club and spent time on loan at Rochdale, Belenenses, Vitória de Setúbal, Kortrijk, Hearts and Huddersfield Town. In July 2021, he joined Dutch club RKC Waalwijk after his contract at United expired.

Pereira initially played youth international football for his country of birth, Switzerland, before making more than 30 appearances for Portugal's youth national teams.

== Early life ==
Pereira was born in Boudevilliers, in the Swiss Canton of Neuchâtel, to Portuguese parents from Cabeceiras de Basto. In his childhood, he played football for Le Locle and Neuchâtel Xamax.

== Club career ==
=== Manchester United ===
Pereira signed for Manchester United at the age of 16 in 2012. He was part of the team that won the 2014–15 Under-21 Development League title, and extended his contract on 13 August 2015, amidst a goalkeeping saga at the club. His sole Premier League appearance for Manchester United came against Crystal Palace on 21 May 2017.

On 4 June 2021, Manchester United announced a list with eight players whose contracts are set to expire, with one of them being Joel Pereira.

==== 2015–16: Loan to Rochdale ====
On 17 October 2015, he was loaned to Rochdale in Football League One for a month. Later that day, he had his first senior call-up, remaining an unused substitute as the team drew 0–0 away to Bury.

On 10 November 2015, he made his debut in a 1–0 loss to Morecambe at Spotland, in the quarter-finals of the Football League Trophy. Manager Keith Hill praised the goalkeeper's performance after he was named man of the match and saved a penalty kick. On 19 November 2015, he extended his loan until 3 January 2016. Two days later, Pereira made his Football League debut, in a 2–0 away win against Doncaster Rovers. He totalled eight appearances for Rochdale, six in the league.

On 25 February 2016, he had his first call-up to a senior Manchester United game, sitting on the bench for their 5–1 home win over Midtjylland in the last 32 second leg of the UEFA Europa League.

==== 2016–17: Loan to Belenenses and Premier League debut ====
On 31 August 2016, he joined Primeira Liga club Belenenses on loan. His loan spell ended on 5 January 2017, due to Manchester United's third-choice goalkeeper Sam Johnstone joining Aston Villa on loan. Pereira made his Manchester United debut on 29 January 2017, in an FA Cup fourth round tie against Wigan Athletic, coming on as an 80th-minute substitute for Sergio Romero. On 21 May 2017, he started for the first time in the Premier League against Crystal Palace at Old Trafford.

==== 2017–18: New contract ====
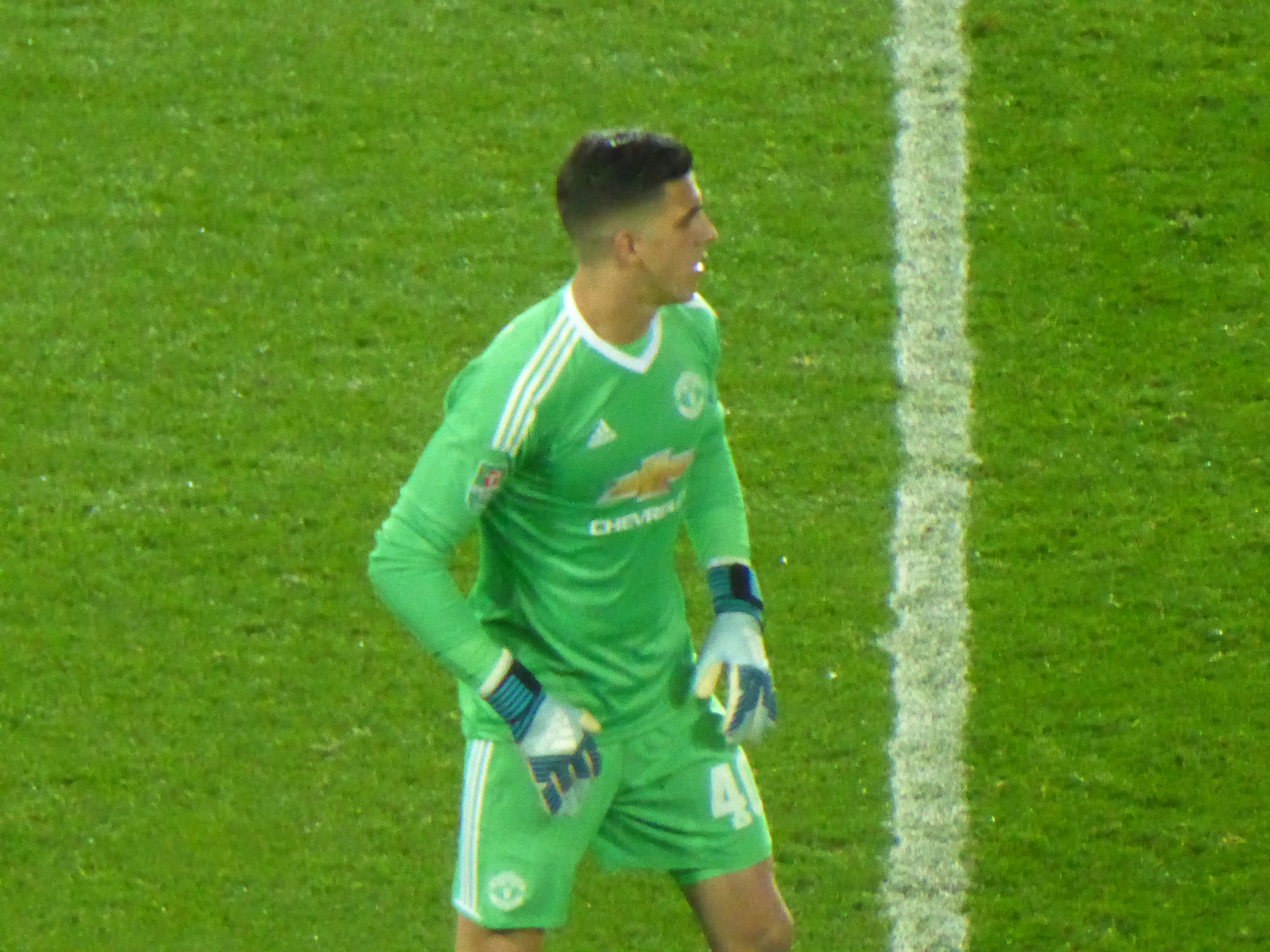
Pereira playing for United in a League Cup match against Burton Albion in 2017

On 1 July 2017, Pereira signed a four-year deal to stay at Manchester United until 2021. On 20 September 2017, he appeared as a substitute against Burton Albion in the EFL Cup and conceded a last-minute goal.

==== 2018–19: Loans to Setúbal and Kortrijk ====
On 2 August 2018, he joined Vitória de Setúbal on loan for the 2018–19 season. After making ten appearances in all competitions, Pereira's loan spell was terminated in January 2019 and he returned to Manchester United. At the end of January 2019, he went out on loan again, this time to Belgium with Kortrijk. He made five appearances for the club in the Europa League playoffs.

==== 2019–20: Loan to Hearts ====
Pereira went out on loan again for the 2019–20 season, joining Scottish Premiership club Hearts on 13 August 2019. He made his debut three days later in the second round of the Scottish League Cup, a 2–1 win at Motherwell. On 25 August, he played for the first time in the Scottish Premiership, losing 3–1 away to reigning champions Celtic.

In February 2020, with Hearts at the bottom of the Premiership table, Pereira was criticised for a series of mistakes, including in a 5–0 defeat to Celtic. Hearts manager Daniel Stendel admitted he was considering replacing Pereira for their next match against Hamilton Academical. Pereira made 25 appearances for Hearts. He was so bad, the Hearts supporters gave him the nickname "Poppadom Hands".

==== 2020–21: Loan to Huddersfield Town ====
On 29 August 2020, Pereira signed for EFL Championship club Huddersfield Town on loan for the 2020–21 season.

On 6 April 2021, Pereira was in goal as Norwich City thrashed Huddersfield 7–0. He was a last-minute replacement for Ryan Schofield, who was unwell.

=== RKC Waalwijk ===
On 5 July 2021, Pereira was confirmed as a new signing at the Mandemakers Stadion on a one-year deal with Eredivisie side RKC Waalwijk, with the option to extend for another year. However, he only managed to make four appearances for the club.

=== Reading ===
On 9 September 2023, he joined EFL League One club Reading on a one-year deal. On 8 May 2024, Reading activated a one-year extension to Pereira's contract, keeping him at the club until the summer of 2025. On 12 June 2025, Pereira signed a three year deal with the Royals, keeping him at the club until 2028. On 22 August 2026, Pereira made his 100th appearance for Reading, keeping a clean sheet in the 0-0 draw against AFC Wimbledon.

== International career ==
Pereira is eligible to represent Switzerland or Portugal at international level. In 2011, he made two appearances for the Switzerland under-15s (against Belgium and Turkey). He was promoted to the under-16s in September 2011, making his debut in a 6–2 win over Italy on 6 September, the first of five appearances in total for the under-16 team. Shortly after joining Manchester United in August 2012, he was invited to play for Portugal instead. He made 35 appearances for Portugal from under-17 to under-21 level.

In July 2016, Pereira was selected in the Portugal under-23 squad for the 2016 Olympic Games. He was an unused substitute in all four of Portugal's matches in the tournament. In May 2017, he was selected in the Portugal under-21 squad for the 2017 UEFA European Under-21 Championship.

== Career statistics ==
As of match played 21 October 2026

Appearances and goals by club, season and competition
Club	Season	League			National cup		League cup		Europe		Other		Total	
Club	Season	Division	Apps	Goals	Apps	Goals	Apps	Goals	Apps	Goals	Apps	Goals	Apps	Goals
Manchester United	2015–16	Premier League	0	0	0	0	0	0	0	0	—		0	0
Manchester United	2016–17	Premier League	1	0	1	0	0	0	0	0	0	0	2	0
Manchester United	2017–18	Premier League	0	0	0	0	1	0	0	0	0	0	1	0
Manchester United	2018–19	Premier League	0	0	0	0	0	0	0	0	—		0	0
Manchester United	2019–20	Premier League	0	0	0	0	0	0	0	0	—		0	0
Manchester United	2020–21	Premier League	0	0	0	0	0	0	0	0	—		0	0
Manchester United	Total		1	0	1	0	1	0	0	0	0	0	3	0
Rochdale (loan)	2015–16	League One	6	0	1	0	0	0	—		1 (Note: Appearance(s) in EFL Trophy)	0	8	0
Belenenses (loan)	2016–17	Primeira Liga	8	0	1	0	1	0	—		—		10	0
Vitória de Setúbal (loan)	2018–19	Primeira Liga	9	0	0	0	1	0	—		—		10	0
Kortrijk (loan)	2018–19	First Division A	0	0	0	0	—		—		5 (Note: Appearances in Belgian First Division A Europa League playoffs)	0	5	0
Hearts (loan)	2019–20	Scottish Premiership	20	0	2	0	3	0	—		—		25	0
Huddersfield Town (loan)	2020–21	Championship	2	0	0	0	0	0	—		—		2	0
RKC Waalwijk	2021–22	Eredivisie	2	0	0	0	—		—		—		2	0
RKC Waalwijk	2022–23	Eredivisie	2	0	1	0	—		—		—		3	0
RKC Waalwijk	Total		4	0	1	0	—		—		—		5	0
Reading	2023–24	League One	9	0	2	0	—		—		3	0	14	0
Reading	2024–25	League One	40	0	0	0	0	0	—		0	0	40	0
Reading	2025–26	League One	43	0	0	0	0	0	—		0	0	43	0
Reading	2026–27	League One	11	0	0	0	3	0	—		0	0	14	0
Reading	Total		103	0	2	0	3	0	—		3	0	111	0
Career total			153	0	8	0	9	0	0	0	9	0	179	0

== Honours ==
Individual

- Toulon Tournament Best Goalkeeper: 2016
