= Vurnon Anita =

Curaçaoan footballer (born 1989)

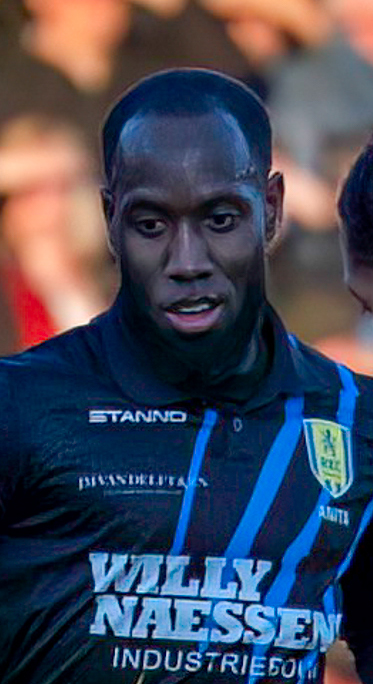
- Anita in 2023 playing for RKC Waalwijk

Personal information
- Full name: Vurnon San Benito Anita
- Date of birth: 4 April 1989 (age 37)
- Place of birth: Willemstad, Curaçao, Netherlands Antilles
- Height: 1.69 m (5 ft 7 in)
- Position: Defensive midfielder

Team information
- Current team: Ajax Amateurs

Youth career
- 1996–1997: CVV Willemstad
- 1997–1999: VV Maarssen
- 1999–2006: Ajax

Senior career*
| Years | Team | Apps | (Gls) |
| 2006–2012 | Ajax | 109 | (5) |
| 2012–2017 | Newcastle United | 133 | (2) |
| 2017–2019 | Leeds United | 18 | (0) |
| 2018–2019 | → Willem II (loan) | 27 | (0) |
| 2020 | CSKA Sofia | 2 | (0) |
| 2020–2023 | RKC Waalwijk | 95 | (3) |
| 2023–2024 | Al-Orobah | 32 | (2) |
| 2025 | Volendam | 12 | (0) |
| 2025– | Ajax Amateurs | 0 | (0) |

International career^{‡}
| 2003–2004 | Netherlands U15 | 4 | (3) |
| 2004–2006 | Netherlands U17 | 28 | (3) |
| 2006–2008 | Netherlands U19 | 13 | (2) |
| 2008–2009 | Netherlands U20 | 2 | (0) |
| 2009–2010 | Netherlands U21 | 6 | (0) |
| 2010 | Netherlands | 3 | (0) |
| 2021–2023 | Curaçao | 17 | (0) |
Medal record
Representing Netherlands
UEFA European Under-17 Championship
| Runner-up | 2005 | U-17 Team |
- * Club domestic league appearances and goals as of 13 May 2025 ‡ National team caps and goals as of 17 February 2024 (UTC)

Vurnon San Benito Anita (born 4 April 1989) is a Curaçaoan professional footballer who plays as a defensive midfielder or full-back for Vierde Divisie side Ajax Amateurs. Born in Curaçao and raised in the Netherlands, Anita played for the Netherlands national team in 2010 before switching to play for the Curaçao national team in 2021.

Anita releases rap music under the moniker "JR (Vurnon Anita)".

== Club career ==
=== Early career ===
In his youth years on Curaçao, Anita started to play football at local team CVV Willemstad. After he and his family moved to the Netherlands in 1997, he started playing for amateur side VV Maarssen. Later he was scouted by Ajax and he joined their world-famous youth program in 1999.

=== Ajax ===
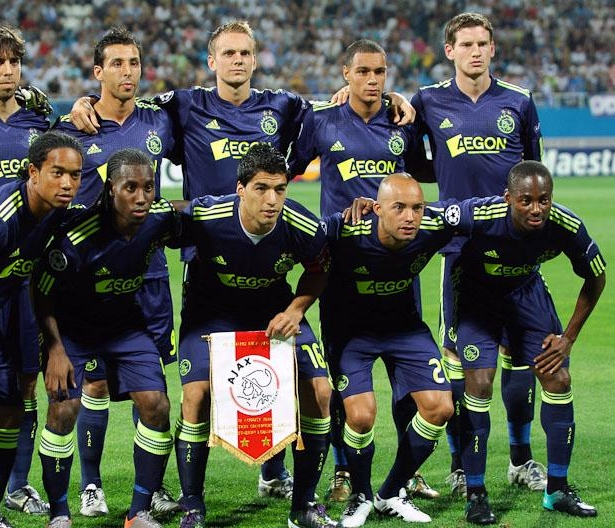
Anita (second from bottom left) with Ajax teammates in 2010

As of the 2005–06 season he was promoted to the first team of Ajax and on 19 March 2006 he made his Eredivisie debut in a 3–2 away loss against FC Groningen. That year he also participated in the KNVB Cup semi-final against Roda JC. Ajax went on to win the KNVB Cup that year.

The following season he added another match to his Eredivisie total, bringing it to two appearances. He also made his European debut in the 3–0 away loss against Werder Bremen in the UEFA Cup. In the 2007–08 season Anita did not play any matches for the first team, but in the 2008–09 he returned to the first team squad. He played a total of 16 matches, mainly as a replacement for injured or suspended teammates.

In the 2009–10 season Anita became a first team regular under new head coach Martin Jol. Because of a suspension of Urby Emanuelson and a long-time injury of Thimothée Atouba, Anita was posted as a left back. Jol was satisfied with his performance and continued to let him play as a left back for most of the season. He also played in the KNVB Cup final against Feyenoord and won his second KNVB Cup. His good performances also led to his debut at the Dutch national team. However, he was not selected for the squad for 2010 FIFA World Cup by coach Bert van Marwijk.

The 2010–11 season started as the previous season ended with Anita playing most matches as a left back. Ajax managed to qualify for the Group stage of the UEFA Champions League for the first time since 2005–06. Because of the poor team performances during the first half of the season, Martin Jol left Ajax in December 2010 and was replaced by Frank de Boer. He believed Anita should play as a defensive midfielder rather than left back. As a consequence, Anita had to compete with other midfielders for his place in the starting line-up. He successfully did so and managed to play most matches. The season ended with two finals against FC Twente. Twente won the KNVB Cup final with 3–2, but Ajax secured the Eredivisie championship at the last matchday by winning 3–1. It was the first league title of Anita. In April 2011 it was announced that Anita signed a new contract at Ajax, binding him to the club until 2014.

=== Newcastle United ===
After Ajax had rejected Newcastle's first bid, the clubs eventually came to an agreement after the second offer from the English club of an undisclosed fee, thought to be around £6.2 million. He signed a five-year deal and took the number 8 shirt, last worn by Danny Guthrie. Anita made his debut on 18 August 2012, replacing Yohan Cabaye, as the Magpies defeated Tottenham Hotspur 2–1 on the opening day of the Premier League season. He made his first start for the club against Atromitos F.C. in the Europa League on 23 August, the game finished 1–1. He scored his first goal for Newcastle in a Europa League fixture against Club Brugge at the Jan Breydel Stadium on 8 November.

Anita scored his first league goal for Newcastle on 1 March 2014 in a comfortable 4–1 win away from home over Hull City, but the match was marred by controversy as manager Alan Pardew headbutted Hull player David Meyler. After Siem de Jong signed for Newcastle on 1 July 2014, the player revealed that both Anita and Tim Krul were very influential in persuading him to leave Ajax and join Tyneside.

Under new Manager Steve McClaren, Anita became a regular in centre midfield during the 2015–16 season. In the first half of the season he played eighteen of the first nineteen games before on 28 December 2015 he picked up a hamstring injury against West Bromwich Albion, which would keep him out for a lengthy period, the season saw Newcastle relegated to The Championship with Anita playing 28 games.

He was played mostly at right back during the 2016–17 season, playing 31 games in all competitions, which saw Anita win the EFL Championship 2016–17 season and gain promotion to the Premier League On 9 June 2017, Anita left Newcastle when his contract expired at the end of the 2016–17 season.

=== Leeds United ===
On 6 July 2017, Anita signed a three-year contract with Leeds United. On 6 August 2017, Anita made his Leeds United debut at left back coming on as a first half substitute for the injured Gaetano Berardi in the 3–2 victory against Bolton Wanderers. His first start came in the following game on 9 August 2017 in the League Cup 4–1 victory against Port Vale.

Due to injuries to regular fullbacks including Luke Ayling, Gaetano Berardi and Laurens De Bock during the season, Anita was used as right-back or left-back during the 2017–18 season, with Talksport's Billy Hawkins opining that Anita and De Bock "made appearances on the left of defence to little success".

On 26 July 2018, Anita was not given a shirt number for Leeds for the upcoming 2018–19 season.

On 2 September 2019, Anita's contract with Leeds was terminated by mutual consent.

==== Willem II loan ====
On 31 August 2018, he joined Dutch club Willem II on a season-long loan. He made his debut on 1 September 2018 in a defeat to PSV Eindhoven. In total, he made 27 appearances for Willem II in Eredivisie.

After returning to Leeds after the end of his loan spell, Anita held talks with Super League Greece side Panathinaikos over a move.

=== CSKA Sofia ===
Anita joined Bulgarian club CSKA Sofia in late February 2020, but only made two league and one Cup appearances for the team, as the championship was suspended in March due to the COVID-19 pandemic. He cancelled his contract with the club prior to the resumption of the matches in June.

=== RKC Waalwijk ===
On 31 August 2020, Anita joined Dutch club RKC Waalwijk for free. After initially leaving the club at the end of the 2020–21 season, on 26 August 2021 he re-signed for another season. He renewed his contract on 24 July 2022, another one-year deal.

=== Al-Orobah ===
On 23 June 2023, Anita joined Saudi First Division League side Al-Orobah.

=== Volendam ===
On 16 January 2025, Anita moved to Volendam on an amateur basis until 30 June 2025.

== International career ==
=== Netherlands ===
Anita competed in the 2005 FIFA U-17 World Championship in Peru for the Netherlands U-17, where the Dutch came third. He has also represented the Netherlands U-19 and Netherlands U-21 teams.

On 26 May 2010, Anita made his full international debut for the Netherlands, coming on as a substitute in a 2–1 friendly victory over Mexico. He made his first appearance in the starting eleven in a 1–1 friendly draw with Ukraine on 12 August 2010, being replaced at half-time by PSV Eindhoven defender Erik Pieters.

Anita was included in the preliminary squad for the 2010 FIFA World Cup in South Africa. However, on 27 May 2010, Netherlands manager Bert van Marwijk announced that the player would not be part of the final squad of 23 participating in the competition.

=== Curaçao ===
Anita, who had not appeared for the Netherlands in a competitive senior international football match, formally filed a one-time switch in 2021 to play for the Curaçao national team. He debuted for Curaçao in a 5–0 2022 FIFA World Cup qualification win over Saint Vincent and the Grenadines on 25 March 2021.

== Career statistics ==
=== Club ===
As of match played 15 May 2022

Appearances and goals by club, season and competition
| Club | Season | League | | | National cup | | League cup | | Europe | | Other | | Total | |
| Club | Season | Division | Apps | Goals | Apps | Goals | Apps | Goals | Apps | Goals | Apps | Goals | Apps | Goals |
|---|---|---|---|---|---|---|---|---|---|---|---|---|---|---|
| Jong Ajax | 2005–06 | — | | | 1 | 0 | — | | — | | — | | 1 | 0 |
| Ajax | 2005–06 | Eredivisie | 1 | 0 | 1 | 0 | — | | 0 | 0 | 0 | 0 | 2 | 0 |
| Ajax | 2006–07 | Eredivisie | 1 | 0 | 0 | 0 | — | | 1 (Note: Appearances in the UEFA Cup) | 0 | 0 | 0 | 2 | 0 |
| Ajax | 2007–08 | Eredivisie | 0 | 0 | 0 | 0 | — | | 0 | 0 | 0 | 0 | 0 | 0 |
| Ajax | 2008–09 | Eredivisie | 16 | 0 | 0 | 0 | — | | 5 | 0 | — | | 21 | 0 |
| Ajax | 2009–10 | Eredivisie | 26 | 0 | 5 | 1 | — | | 4 (Note: Appearances in the Europa League) | 0 | — | | 35 | 1 |
| Ajax | 2010–11 | Eredivisie | 31 | 3 | 4 | 1 | — | | 10 (Note: Seven appearances in the UEFA Champions League, three appearances in the UEFA Europa League) | 0 | 1 (Note: Appearances in the Johan Cruijff Schaal) | 0 | 46 | 4 |
| Ajax | 2011–12 | Eredivisie | 33 | 2 | 2 | 0 | — | | 8 (Note: Six appearances in the UEFA Champions League, two appearances in the UEFA Europa League) | 0 | 1 | 0 | 44 | 2 |
| Ajax | 2012–13 | Eredivisie | 1 | 0 | — | | — | | — | | 1 | 0 | 2 | 0 |
| Ajax | Total | | 109 | 5 | 12 | 2 | — | | 28 | 0 | 3 | 0 | 153 | 7 |
| Newcastle United | 2012–13 | Premier League | 25 | 0 | 1 | 0 | 0 | 0 | 11 | 1 | — | | 37 | 1 |
| Newcastle United | 2013–14 | Premier League | 34 | 1 | 1 | 0 | 2 | 0 | — | | | | 37 | 1 |
| Newcastle United | 2014–15 | Premier League | 19 | 0 | 1 | 0 | 1 | 0 | — | | | | 21 | 0 |
| Newcastle United | 2015–16 | Premier League | 28 | 1 | 0 | 0 | 1 | 0 | — | | | | 29 | 1 |
| Newcastle United | 2016–17 | Championship | 27 | 0 | 1 | 0 | 3 | 0 | — | | | | 31 | 0 |
| Newcastle United | Total | | 133 | 2 | 4 | 0 | 7 | 0 | 11 | 1 | 0 | 0 | 155 | 3 |
| Leeds United | 2017–18 | Championship | 18 | 0 | 1 | 0 | 3 | 0 | — | | | | 22 | 0 |
| Willem II (loan) | 2018–19 | Eredivisie | 27 | 0 | 4 | 0 | — | | | | | | 31 | 0 |
| CSKA Sofia | 2019–20 | First League | 2 | 0 | 1 | 0 | — | | | | | | 3 | 0 |
| RKC Waalwijk | 2020–21 | Eredivisie | 29 | 0 | 0 | 0 | — | | | | | | 29 | 0 |
| RKC Waalwijk | 2021–22 | Eredivisie | 32 | 1 | 2 | 0 | — | | | | | | 34 | 1 |
| RKC Waalwijk | 2022–23 | Eredivisie | 0 | 0 | 0 | 0 | — | | | | | | 0 | 0 |
| RKC Waalwijk | Total | | 61 | 1 | 2 | 0 | — | | | | | | 63 | 1 |
| Career total | | | 350 | 8 | 24 | 2 | 10 | 0 | 39 | 1 | 3 | 0 | 427 | 11 |

=== International ===
As of match played 18 October 2023

Appearances and goals by national team and year
| National team | Year | Apps | Goals |
|---|---|---|---|
| Netherlands | 2010 | 3 | 0 |
| Curaçao | 2021 | 8 | 0 |
| Curaçao | 2022 | 3 | 0 |
| Curaçao | 2023 | 6 | 0 |
| Curaçao | Total | 20 | 0 |

== Honours ==
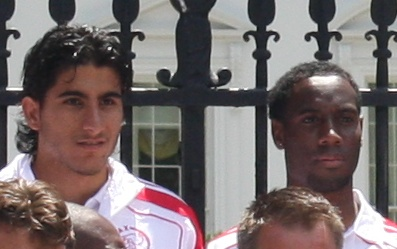
Anita (right) with former Ajax teammate Aras Özbiliz

Ajax

- Eredivisie: 2010–11, 2011–12
- KNVB Cup: 2009–10
- Johan Cruijff Shield: 2007

Newcastle United

- EFL Championship: 2016–17

FC Volendam

- Eerste divisie: 2024–25

European Selection U-18

- UEFA–CAF Meridian Cup: 2007

Individual

- Eredivisie Team of the Month: September 2022
