= Thierry Lutonda =

Belgian footballer (born 2000)

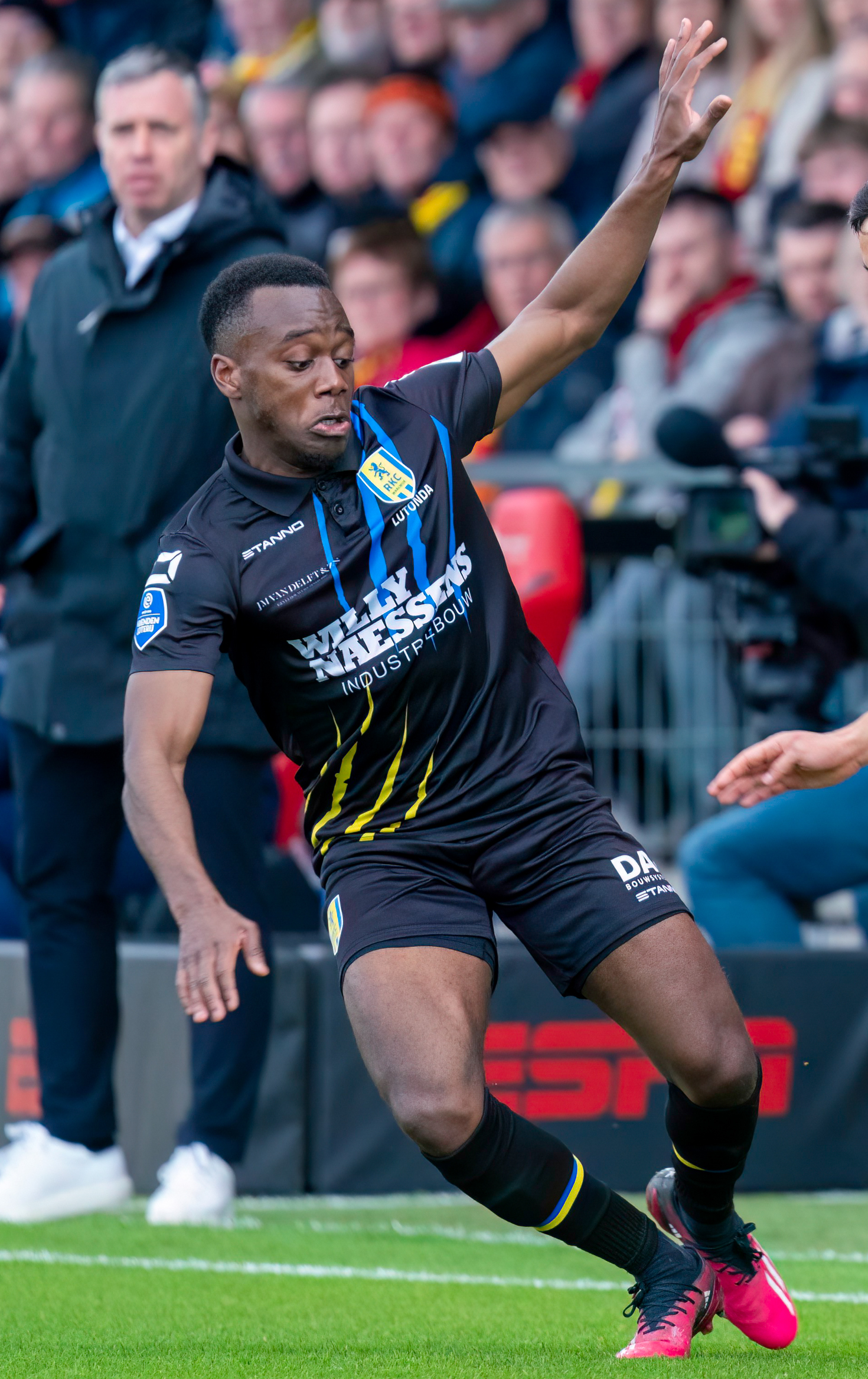

Personal information
- Date of birth: 27 October 2000 (age 26)
- Place of birth: Liège, Belgium
- Height: 1.67 m (5 ft 6 in)
- Position: Left-back

Team information
- Current team: RAAL La Louvière
- Number: 5

Senior career*
Years	Team	Apps	(Gls)
2019–2021	Anderlecht	1	(0)
2020–2021	→ RKC Waalwijk (loan)	21	(0)
2021–2024	RKC Waalwijk	55	(1)
2024–2025	PEC Zwolle	11	(0)
2025–	RAAL La Louvière	26	(1)

International career
2016	Belgium U16	4	(0)
2016–2017	Belgium U17	8	(0)
2017–2018	Belgium U18	7	(0)
2018–2019	Belgium U19	7	(1)
- * Club domestic league appearances and goals as of 11 May 2026

Thierry Lutonda (born 27 October 2000) is a Belgian professional footballer who plays as a left-back for Belgian Pro League club RAAL La Louvière.

== Club career ==
In November 2016, Lutonda signed his first professional contract with Anderlecht. On 12 March 2019, he signed a three-year contract with the club until 2022. He made his professional debut for Anderlecht in a 2–1 Belgian First Division A defeat against Oostende on 28 July 2019.

On 9 July 2020, Lutonda joined RKC Waalwijk on a season-long loan. At the end of the 2020–21 season, RKC Waalwijk avoided relegation, and that triggered a clause in the loan contract to make transfer permanent, with the new contract running until 2024.

On 24 May 2024, Lutonda signed a two-year contract with PEC Zwolle, beginning in the 2024–25 season.

On 7 August 2025, Lutonda returned to Belgium to sign for newly promoted RAAL La Louvière on a two-year contract with an option for two additional years.

== Personal life ==
Born in Belgium, Lutonda is of Congolese descent.
