= Mark Spenkelink =

Dutch footballer (born 1997)

Personal information
- Date of birth: 27 January 1997 (age 29)
- Place of birth: Borne, Netherlands
- Height: 1.96 m (6 ft 5 in)
- Position: Goalkeeper

Team information
- Current team: RKC Waalwijk
- Number: 16

Youth career
- 2011–2012: NEO
- 2012–2014: Twente
- 2012–2017: Go Ahead Eagles

Senior career*
Years	Team	Apps	(Gls)
2017–2020	Go Ahead Eagles	0	(0)
2019	→ Karlstad (loan)	2	(0)
2020–2021	Jong PSV	3	(0)
2021–2022	Locomotive Tbilisi	9	(0)
2022–2024	RKC Waalwijk	1	(0)
2024–2025	TOP Oss	0	(0)
2025–	RKC Waalwijk	37	(0)
- * Club domestic league appearances and goals as of 25 April 2026

Mark Spenkelink (born 27 January 1997) is a Dutch professional footballer who plays as a goalkeeper for Eerste Divisie club RKC Waalwijk.

== Club career ==
On 31 December 2021, Spenkelink signed with RKC Waalwijk until the end of the 2021–22 season. In June 2022, he extended his contract with the club until 2024. Mainly the third-string goalkeeper during his tenure at the club, Spenkelink made his Eredivisie debut on 4 November 2023, due to injuries to Etienne Vaessen and Jeroen Houwen. He played the full game as RKC lost 2–1 to Feyenoord.

On 3 September 2024, Spenkelink signed a one-season contract with TOP Oss. He was removed from the club's official squad on 7 January 2025, while continuing to train with the team.
