= Shawn Adewoye =

Belgian footballer

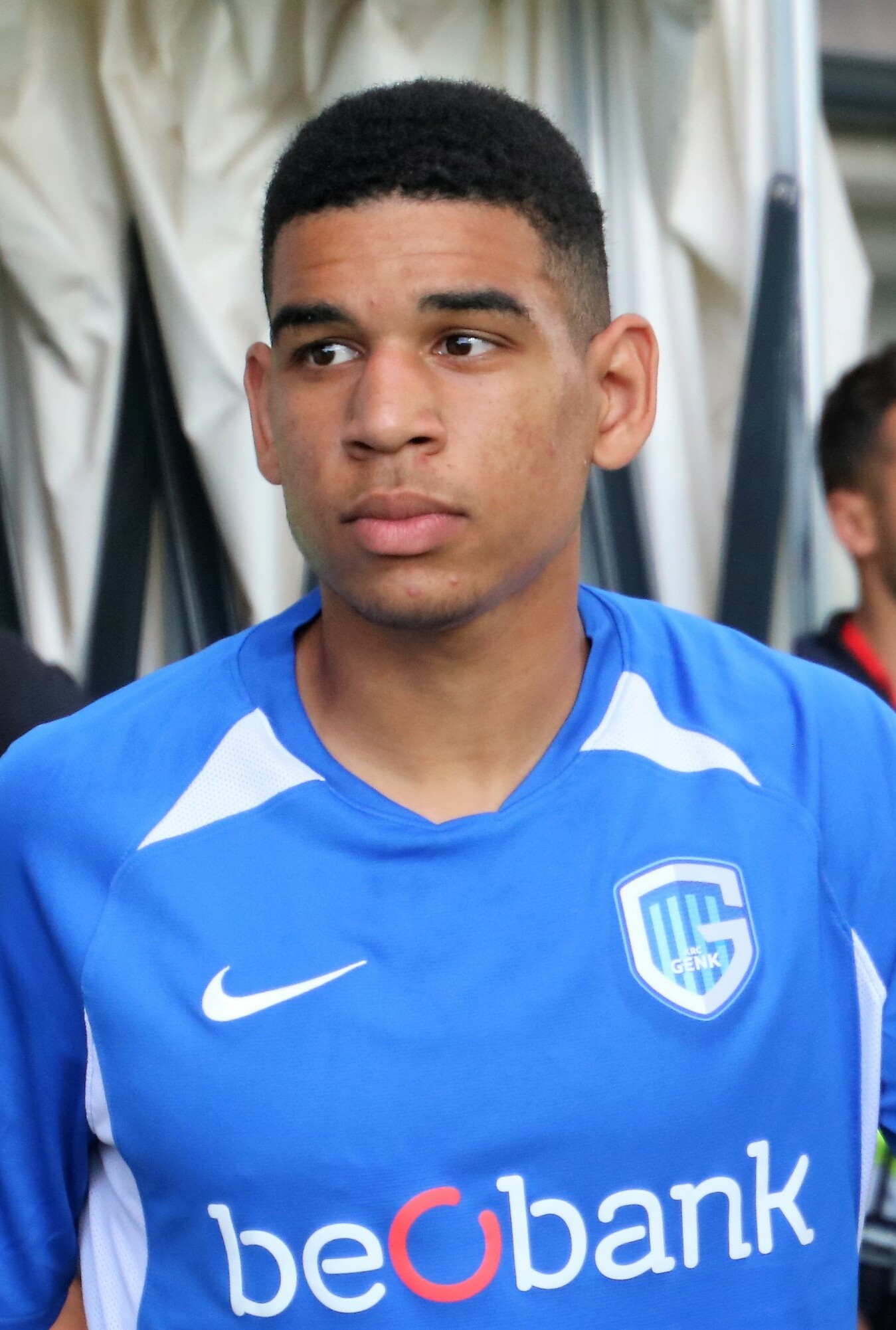
- Adewoye with Genk in 2019

Personal information
- Date of birth: 29 June 2000 (age 26)
- Place of birth: Bree, Belgium
- Height: 1.81 m (5 ft 11 in)
- Position: Centre-back

Team information
- Current team: Lommel

Youth career
- 2005–2008: KESK Leopoldsburg
- 2008–2019: Genk

Senior career*
Years	Team	Apps	(Gls)
2019–2021	Genk	0	(0)
2021–2024	RKC Waalwijk	87	(2)
2024–2026	Fortuna Sittard	52	(1)
2026–	Lommel	0	(0)

International career
2014–2015	Belgium U15	5	(0)
2016	Belgium U16	3	(0)
2017	Belgium U17	4	(0)
2017–2018	Belgium U18	4	(1)
2018	Belgium U19	1	(0)
- * Club domestic league appearances and goals as of 21 May 2026

Shawn Adewoye (born 29 June 2000) is a Belgian professional footballer who plays as a centre-back for Belgian Pro League club Lommel.

== Club career ==
Adewoye is a youth product of the academies of KESK Leopoldsburg and Genk. Beginning his senior career with the reserves of Genk, he transferred to the Dutch club RKC Waalwijk on 31 January 2021. He made his professional debut with Waalwijk in a 2–0 Eredivisie loss to Sparta Rotterdam on 13 March 2021.

On 19 July 2024, Adewoye signed a two-year contract with Fortuna Sittard.

On 3 August 2026, Adewoye returned to Belgium and joined Lommel, newly promoted into the top tier.

== International career ==
Adewoye was born in Belgium to a Nigerian father, and a Belgian mother of Italian descent. He is a youth international for Belgium, having represented the Belgium U15s, U16s, Belgium U17s, Belgium U18s, and U19s.
