= Mats Seuntjens =

Dutch footballer

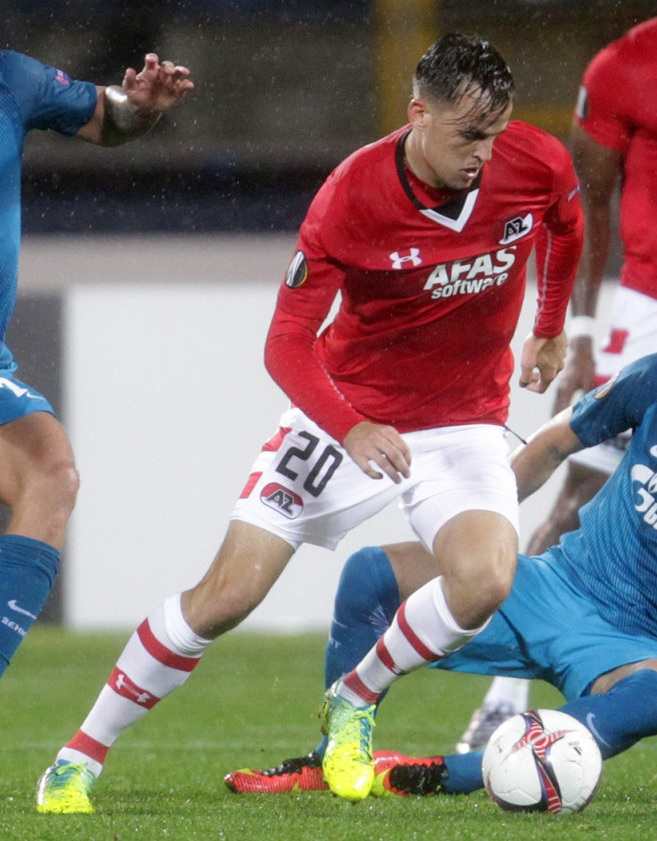
- Seuntjens with AZ in 2016

Personal information
- Date of birth: 17 April 1992 (age 34)
- Place of birth: Breda, Netherlands
- Height: 1.87 m (6 ft 2 in)
- Position: Attacking midfielder

Team information
- Current team: NAC Breda

Youth career
- BSV Boeimeer
- NAC Breda

Senior career*
Years	Team	Apps	(Gls)
2012–2016	NAC Breda	116	(19)
2016–2019	AZ	88	(9)
2016–2018	Jong AZ	8	(1)
2019–2020	Gençlerbirliği	18	(0)
2020–2022	Fortuna Sittard	75	(15)
2023	RKC Waalwijk	19	(4)
2023–2024	FC Utrecht	15	(1)
2024	RKC Waalwijk	12	(1)
2024–2025	Castellón	12	(0)
2025–2026	Groningen	29	(3)
2026–	NAC Breda	0	(0)
- * Club domestic league appearances and goals as of 19 May 2026

Mats Seuntjens (Dutch pronunciation: [mɑt ˈsøːɲtɕəns]; born 17 April 1992) is a Dutch professional footballer who plays as an attacking midfielder for Eerste Divisie club NAC Breda.

== Club career ==
Seuntjens played as a youth for BSV Boeimeer, and at the age of 18 joined the NAC Breda youth academy in 2010 as an under-19 player. He made his professional debut for the club 28 January 2012 in a match against De Graafschap.

On 30 May 2016, Seuntjens moved to AZ, after an impressing 2015–16 season with NAC where he scored 13 goals and made 14 assists in 35 appearances in the Eerste Divisie. He made his debut for AZ on 28 July in a Europa League qualifier against Greek club PAS Giannina, coming on as a 87th-minute substitute for Joris van Overeem in a 1–0 home win. During his three seasons in Alkmaar, Seuntjens made 110 total appearances in which he scored 11 goals.

On 1 July 2019, Seuntjens signed a two-year contract with Turkish Süper Lig club Gençlerbirliği after having lost his spot in the AZ starting eleven under new head coach Arne Slot. He made his official debut for the club on 17 August as a starter in a 1–0 loss to Rizespor.

Seuntjens moved to Fortuna Sittard on 15 August 2020 after an unsuccessful spell in Turkey.

On 1 January 2023, Seuntjens moved to RKC Waalwijk, after 2.5 years with Fortuna Sittard. On 9 June, he signed a one-season contract with FC Utrecht, with the club holding an option to extend for one more year, but returned to RKC Waalwijk on 13 January 2024.

On 15 July 2024, Seuntjens moved to Spain and was announced at Segunda División side Castellón, managed by compatriot Dick Schreuder.

On 3 January 2025, Seuntjens returned to the Netherlands and signed a one-and-a-half-year contract with Groningen.

On 24 July 2026, Seuntjens came back to his first club NAC Breda for two seasons.

== Personal ==
His brother is professional footballer Ralf Seuntjens.

== Honours ==
Individual

- Eredivisie Team of the Month: August 2021,
