= Luuk Wouters =

Dutch footballer (born 1999)

Personal information
- Date of birth: 8 June 1999 (age 27)
- Place of birth: Schijndel, Netherlands
- Height: 1.90 m (6 ft 3 in)
- Position: Defender

Team information
- Current team: Vitesse
- Number: 15

Youth career
- Willem II

Senior career*
| Years | Team | Apps | (Gls) |
| 2020–2026 | RKC Waalwijk | 80 | (0) |
| 2023–2024 | → FC Eindhoven (loan) | 29 | (0) |
| 2026– | Vitesse | 0 | (0) |
- * Club domestic league appearances and goals as of 25 April 2026

Luuk Wouters (born 8 June 1999) is a Dutch professional footballer who plays as a defender for Eerste Divisie club Vitesse.

== Career ==
On 31 August 2023, Wouters joined FC Eindhoven on a season-long loan.

On 31 August 2026, Wouter signed a two-year contract with Eerste Divisie club Vitesse.
