= Lars Nieuwpoort =

Dutch footballer

Personal information
- Date of birth: 29 October 1994 (age 32)
- Place of birth: Den Helder, Netherlands
- Height: 1.85 m (6 ft 1 in)
- Position: Centre-back

Youth career
- AZ

Senior career*
Years	Team	Apps	(Gls)
2013–2017	Almere City	97	(3)
2017–2019	De Graafschap	40	(3)
2019–2023	RKC	20	(0)
2023–2024	Karmiotissa	13	(0)
2024	TOP Oss	12	(0)
- * Club domestic league appearances and goals as of 10 May 2024

Lars Nieuwpoort (born 29 October 1994) is a Dutch professional footballer who plays as a centre-back. He formerly played for Almere City, De Graafschap, RKC Waalwijk, Karmiotissa and TOP Oss.
