= Iliass Bel Hassani =

Moroccan footballer (born 1992)

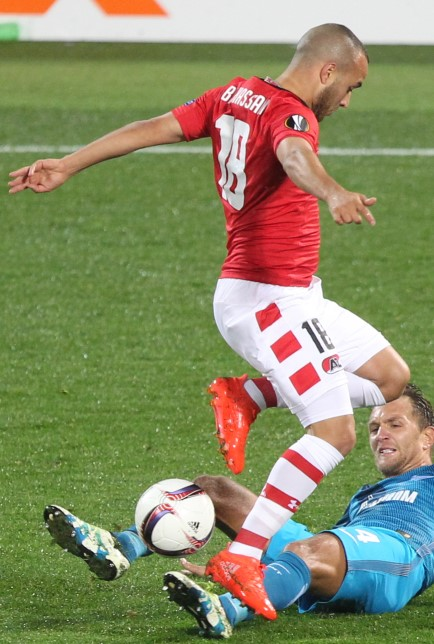
- Bel Hassani with AZ

Personal information
- Date of birth: 16 September 1992 (age 34)
- Place of birth: Rotterdam, Netherlands
- Height: 1.73 m (5 ft 8 in)
- Position: Attacking midfielder

Youth career
- SVVSMC
- Sparta

Senior career*
Years	Team	Apps	(Gls)
2010–2013	Sparta	75	(16)
2013–2016	Heracles	96	(15)
2016–2019	AZ	31	(1)
2017–2018	Jong AZ	10	(0)
2019	→ Groningen (loan)	14	(1)
2019–2020	PEC Zwolle	14	(5)
2020	Al-Wakrah	4	(2)
2021	Ajman	4	(0)
2021–2023	RKC	41	(5)
2023–2024	Al-Jabalain	2	(2)
Total		291	(47)

International career
2012	Morocco U23	2	(0)
- * Club domestic league appearances and goals as of 28 May 2023

Iliass Bel Hassani (Arabic: إلياس بلحساني born 16 September 1992) is a Moroccan footballer who most recently played as an attacking midfielder for Saudi Arabian club Al-Jabalain.

== Club career ==
Born in Rotterdam, Bel Hassani made his professional debut for hometown club Sparta in August 2010 against RBC and was rewarded with the Gouden Stier (Golden Bull) Award for the most promising player in the Eerste Divisie in May 2012. In his time at the club he scored 16 goals in 75 matches.

In September 2013, he signed a three-year contract with the option of a fourth with Heracles. He had his first taste of European football playing in the 2016–17 UEFA Europa League for Heracles against Portuguese side Arouca.

In late August 2016, he joined AZ on a five-year contract until 2021.

On 24 December 2018, it was announced that Bel Hassani would join FC Groningen on a loan spell until the end of the season. He signed for PEC Zwolle in July 2019.

On 28 January 2020, Al-Wakrah signed Bel Hassani for one season from PEC Zwolle.

On 1 July 2021, it was announced that Bel Hassani had signed with RKC Waalwijk on a one-year contract, coming over from Emirati club Ajman, where he had spent the previous six months.

On 8 July 2023, Bel Hassani joined Saudi Arabian club Al-Jabalain.

== International career ==
Bel Hassani was born in the Netherlands to parents of Moroccan descent. He debuted for the Morocco U23 national team in a 4–3 loss to the Mexico U23.

== Career statistics ==
As of match played 17 February 2018

Appearances and goals by club, season and competitions
Club	Season	League			KNVB Beker		Other		Total	
Club	Season	Division	Apps	Goals	Apps	Goals	Apps	Goals	Apps	Goals
Sparta Rotterdam	2010–11	Eerste Divisie	7	1	0	0	0	0	7	1
Sparta Rotterdam	2011–12	Eerste Divisie	30	5	3	3	2 (Note: Appearances in the 2011–12 Eerste Divisie promotion play-offs)	1	35	9
Sparta Rotterdam	2012–13	Eerste Divisie	33	9	2	1	4 (Note: Appearances in the 2012–13 Eerste Divisie promotion play-offs)	1	39	11
Sparta Rotterdam	2013–14	Eerste Divisie	5	1	0	0	0	0	5	1
Sparta Rotterdam	Total		75	16	5	4	6	2	86	22
Heracles Almelo	2013–14	Eredivisie	27	2	3	0	—		30	2
Heracles Almelo	2014–15	Eredivisie	31	4	3	0	—		34	4
Heracles Almelo	2015–16	Eredivisie	34	8	3	2	3 (Note: Appearances in the Eredivisie European competition play-offs)	0	40	10
Heracles Almelo	2016–17	Eredivisie	4	1	0	0	2 (Note: Appearances in the Europa League)	0	6	1
Heracles Almelo	Total		96	15	9	2	5	0	110	17
AZ Alkmaar	2016–17	Eredivisie	25	1	4	2	7	0	36	3
AZ Alkmaar	2017–18	Eredivisie	3	0	0	0	—		3	0
AZ Alkmaar	Total		28	1	4	2	7	0	39	3
Jong AZ	2017–18	Eerste Divisie	7	0	—		—		7	0
Career total			206	32	18	8	18	2	242	42
