= 2024–25 RKC Waalwijk season =

RKC Waalwijk
2024–25 season
- Head coach: Henk Fraser
- Stadium: Mandemakers Stadion
- Eredivisie: 17th (relegated)
- KNVB Cup: Round of 16
- Top goalscorer: League: Oskar Zawada (9); All: Oskar Zawada (11)

The 2024–25 season was RKC Waalwijk's 85th season in existence and sixth consecutive in the Dutch top division Eredivisie. They were also competing in the KNVB Cup.

== Season summary ==
RKC Waalwijk endured a historically poor start to the season, equalling the league record for most consecutive defeats to start a season, and struggled with discipline, receiving six red cards in the first twelve matches. Head coach Henk Fraser remained in charge throughout, despite mounting criticism. In October, the club attracted national attention by signing former prodigy Mohamed Ihattaren, whose arrival briefly lifted morale and media focus. A short resurgence in early 2025, including a 5–0 win over NAC Breda, proved insufficient, and relegation to the Eerste Divisie was confirmed on the final matchday.

== Squad information ==
As of 2 September 2024

Note: Flags indicate national team as defined under FIFA eligibility rules; some limited exceptions apply. Players may hold more than one non-FIFA nationality.

No.	Pos.	Nation	Player
1	GK	NED	Jeroen Houwen
2	DF	NED	Julian Lelieveld
3	DF	BEL	Dario Van den Buijs
4	DF	SUR	Liam van Gelderen
5	DF	NED	Juan Castillo
6	MF	MAR	Yassin Oukili
7	FW	SUR	Denilho Cleonise
8	MF	NED	Patrick Vroegh
9	FW	POL	Oskar Zawada (captain)
10	FW	NED	Reuven Niemeijer
11	FW	EGY	Alexander Jakobsen
13	GK	NED	Joey Kesting
14	MF	BEL	Chris Lokesa
15	MF	NED	Nouri El Harmazi
16	GK	NED	Luuk Vogels

No.	Pos.	Nation	Player
17	DF	CUW	Roshon van Eijma
18	FW	NED	Silvester van der Water
19	FW	SUR	Richonell Margaret
20	FW	BEL	Ilias Takidine
21	GK	NED	Yanick van Osch
22	MF	NED	Tim van de Loo
23	MF	NED	Richard van der Venne
24	MF	CUW	Godfried Roemeratoe
28	DF	NED	Aaron Meijers (vice-captain)
29	FW	NED	Michiel Kramer
30	MF	FRA	Daouda Weidmann
33	DF	MAR	Faissal Al Mazyani
34	DF	NED	Luuk Wouters
35	MF	CUW	Kevin Felida
52	MF	NED	Mohamed Ihattaren

== Competitions ==
=== Eredivisie ===
10 August 2024 1	PSV	5–1	RKC Waalwijk	Eindhoven
	Bakayoko 9'; Schouten 28'; Tillman 37'; Lozano 72', 79'	Report	Van der Venne 77'	Stadium: Philips Stadion; Attendance: 34,600; Referee: Joey Kooij

17 August 2024 2	RKC Waalwijk	1–2	FC Groningen	Waalwijk
	van der Venne (yellow card) 48', (goal) 89'; Cleonise (yellow card) 55'; Zawada (red card) 90+6'	Report	Schreuders 11'; Bacuna (yellow card) 67'; van Bergen 77'; Stam (yellow card) 90+3'	Stadium: Mandemakers Stadion; Attendance: 6,492; Referee: Robin Hensgens

25 August 2024 3	Go Ahead Eagles	2–0	RKC Waalwijk	Deventer
	Adekanye 3'; Kramer (yellow card) 32'; James (yellow card) 41'; Nauber (yellow card) 49'; Stokkers 60'	Report	Oukili (yellow card) 11' (yellow-red card) 17'	Stadium: De Adelaarshorst; Attendance: 9,813; Referee: Joey Kooij

30 August 2024 4	RKC Waalwijk	0–3	AZ	Waalwijk
	Niemeijer (yellow card) 21'; Weidmann (yellow card) 26'; Van den Buijs (yellow card) 44'; Kramer (red card) 73'; Lokesa (yellow card) 90+2'	Report	van Bommel 31', 36', (yellow card) 77'; Goes (yellow card) 46'; Meerdink 87'; Belić (yellow card) 90+2'	Stadium: Mandemakers Stadion; Attendance: 7,066; Referee: Rob Dieperink

15 September 2024 5	Willem II	3–0	RKC Waalwijk	Tilburg
	Vaesen 8' (pen.); Meerveld 30'; van Eijma 52' (o.g.); Behounek (yellow card) 55'; Kehrer (yellow card) 90+1'	Report	van Gelderen (yellow card) 81'	Stadium: Koning Willem II Stadion; Attendance: 13,000; Referee: Bas Nijhuis

21 September 2024 6	RKC Waalwijk	1–2	Sparta Rotterdam	Waalwijk
	Margaret 66'	Report	Verschueren (yellow card) 26'; Nassoh 32'; Neghli 55'	Stadium: Mandemakers Stadion; Attendance: 7,179; Referee: Jeroen Manschot

29 September 2024 7	RKC Waalwijk	0–2	Ajax	Waalwijk
	van Gelderen (yellow card) 20'; Meijers (yellow card) 57'	Report	Brobbey (yellow card) 36'; Traoré 76'; Godts 90+4'	Stadium: Mandemakers Stadion; Attendance: 7,254; Referee: Jochem Kamphuis

5 October 2024 8	FC Utrecht	3–2	RKC Waalwijk	Utrecht
	Viergever 28'; Aaronson 51'; Min 52'; Ohio (yellow card) 85'	Report	Cleonise 2'; Meijers (red card) 26'; Margaret 80' (pen.)	Stadium: Stadion Galgenwaard; Attendance: 23,750; Referee: Alex Bos

19 October 2024 9	RKC Waalwijk	2–2	FC Twente	Waalwijk
	Margaret 23'; van der Water 47'; Lelieveld (yellow card) 67'	Report	Steijn 11'; Vlap (yellow card) 27'; Regeer (yellow card) 76'; Eiting 90+1'	Stadium: Mandemakers Stadion; Attendance: 6,674; Referee: Danny Desmond Makkelie

26 October 2024 10	NAC Breda	4–1	RKC Waalwijk	Breda
	Leemans 13', 37'; Van den Bergh (yellow card) 29'; Greiml (yellow card) 40', (goal) 90'; Sauer 60' (pen.)	Report	Roemeratoe (yellow card) 11'; Jensen 45+2' (o.g.); Castillo (yellow card) 50'; Al Mazyani (red card) 66'	Stadium: Rat Verlegh Stadion; Attendance: 18,644; Referee: Joey Kooij

3 November 2024 11	RKC Waalwijk	2–0	Almere City	Waalwijk
	van der Venne 41'; van der Water 58'	Report		Stadium: Mandemakers Stadion; Attendance: 6,721; Referee: Jeroen Manschot

9 November 2024 12	RKC Waalwijk	0–3	NEC Nijmegen	Waalwijk
	Weidmann (yellow card) 45+1' (yellow-red card) 45+2'	Report	van Crooij (yellow card) 45+1'; Ogawa 68'; Ouaissa 74'; Márquez 90'	Stadium: Mandemakers Stadion; Attendance: 6,911; Referee: Erwin Blank

23 November 2024 13	Heracles Almelo	2–2	RKC Waalwijk	Almelo
	Kulenović 29'; De Keersmaecker (yellow card) 38'; Hornkamp 80' (pen.)	Report	van der Venne 57'; Zawada 90+4'	Stadium: Asito Stadion; Attendance: 11,635; Referee: Sander van der Eijk

29 November 2024 14	SC Heerenveen	1–1	RKC Waalwijk	Heerenveen
	Smans 27'	Report	Ihattaren 90+1' (pen.)	Stadium: Abe Lenstra Stadion; Attendance: 22,196; Referee: Edwin van de Graaf

7 December 2024 15	RKC Waalwijk	2–3	Feyenoord	Waalwijk
	Zawada 12'; Oukili 72'	Report	Oukili 24' (o.g.); Moussa 49'; Paixão 74'	Stadium: Mandemakers Stadion; Attendance: 7,481; Referee: Bas Nijhuis

14 December 2024 16	Fortuna Sittard	3–2	RKC Waalwijk	Sittard-Geleen
	da Cruz 19'; Peterson 30'; Bullaude 35'; Michut (yellow card) 90+4'	Report	Zawada 45+1', 66'; Roemeratoe (yellow card) 56'	Stadium: Fortuna Sittard Stadion; Attendance: 10,441; Referee: Marc Nagtegaal

20 December 2024 17	RKC Waalwijk	1–1	PEC Zwolle	Waalwijk
	Zawada 10'; Oukili (yellow card) 84'; Felida (yellow card) 85'	Report	Vente 41' (pen.); Fichtinger (yellow card) 53'	Stadium: Mandemakers Stadion; Attendance: 6,152; Referee: Edwin van de Graaf

11 January 2025 18	AFC Ajax	2–1	RKC Waalwijk	Amsterdam
	Berghuis 4' (pen.); Taylor 41'; Wijndal (yellow card) 90+2'	Report	Ihattaren 86'	Stadium: Johan Cruyff Arena; Attendance: 54,055; Referee: Alex Bos

19 January 2025 19	Sparta Rotterdam	1–1	RKC Waalwijk	Rotterdam
	Bakari 24'	Report	Zawada 10'; Kramer (yellow card) 88'	Stadium: Sparta Stadion; Attendance: 9,030; Referee: Pol van Boekel

26 January 2025 20	RKC Waalwijk	2–0	Willem II	Waalwijk
	St. Jago 22' (o.g.); Ihattaren (yellow card) 38'; van de Loo 46'; Castillo 57'; Oukili (yellow card) 68'	Report	St. Jago (yellow card) 1'; Bosch (yellow card) 37'; Tırpan (yellow card) 73'	Stadium: Mandemakers Stadion; Attendance: 6,639; Referee: Jeroen Manschot

2 February 2025 21	Almere City FC	1–4	RKC Waalwijk	Almere
	Kadile 17'; Jacobs (red card) 46'	Report	Felida (yellow card) 51'; Ihattaren 58'; Zawada (yellow card) 66', (goal) 85'; Oukili 85'; Bakker 90+2' (o.g.)	Stadium: Yanmar Stadion; Attendance: 3,146; Referee: Allard Lindhout

9 February 2025 22	RKC Waalwijk	5–0	NAC Breda	Waalwijk
	Margaret 6'; Oukili 14'; Zawada 28', 73'; Lokesa 90'	Report	Sauer (yellow card) 48'	Stadium: Mandemakers Stadion; Attendance: 6,792; Referee: Bas Nijhuis

16 February 2025 23	FC Twente	2–0	RKC Waalwijk	Enschede
	Lammers 28'; Steijn 83'	Report	van Gelderen (yellow card) 54'; Al Mazyani (yellow card) 77'	Stadium: De Grolsch Veste; Attendance: 29,500; Referee: Pol van Boekel

28 February 2025 24	RKC Waalwijk	1–2	Fortuna Sittard	Waalwijk
	Kramer (yellow card) 48'; van der Water 90+1'	Report	da Cruz 8'; Fosso (yellow card) 43', (goal) 90+4'; Dahlhaus (yellow card) 45+3'; Michut (yellow card) 58'; Pinto (yellow card) 77'	Stadium: Mandemakers Stadion; Attendance: 7,021; Referee: Martin van den Kerkhof

15 March 2025 26	RKC Waalwijk	0–3	PSV	Waalwijk
	Zawada (yellow card) 71'; van der Venne (yellow card) 81'	Report	Perišić 4'; Lang 39'; de Jong 53'	Stadium: Mandemakers Stadion; Attendance: 7,508; Referee: Jeroen Manschot

29 March 2025 27	PEC Zwolle	2–0	RKC Waalwijk	Zwolle
	Vente 74' (pen.); MacNulty (yellow card) 80'; Krastev 83'	Report	Al Mazyani (yellow card) 55' (yellow-red card) 71'	Stadium: MAC³PARK Stadion; Attendance: 13,650; Referee: Danny Desmond Makkelie

1 April 2025 25	AZ	2–2	RKC Waalwijk	Alkmaar
	Parrott 13'; Meerdink 84'	Report	van der Venne (yellow card) 42'; Kramer 62'; Lokesa 82', (yellow card) 89'; van Eijma (yellow card) 85'	Stadium: AFAS Stadion; Attendance: 16,830; Referee: Rob Dieperink

6 April 2025 28	RKC Waalwijk	0–0	Heracles Almelo	Waalwijk
	Margaret (yellow card) 57'	Report	Mesík (yellow card) 52'	Stadium: Mandemakers Stadion; Attendance: 6,982; Referee: Marc Nagtegaal

11 April 2025 29	NEC Nijmegen	2–1	RKC Waalwijk	Nijmegen
	Sano 49'; Ouaissa (yellow card) 65'; Sandler (yellow card) 85'; Linssen 90+2'	Report	Kramer 79'	Stadium: Goffertstadion; Attendance: 12,650; Referee: Dennis Johan Higler

25 April 2025 30	RKC Waalwijk	0–4	FC Utrecht	Waalwijk
	Roemeratoe (yellow card) 66'	Report	Fraulo 15'; Haller 19'; Rodríguez (yellow card) 24', (goal) 27'; Didden (yellow card) 68'; Min 88'	Stadium: Mandemakers Stadion; Attendance: 7,183; Referee: Allard Lindhout

3 May 2025 31	FC Groningen	6–1	RKC Waalwijk	Groningen
	Bacuna 7' (pen.); Resink 45+2', 50'; Emeran 46'; van Bergen 60'; Seuntjens 89'	Report	Lelieveld (yellow card) 18'; Roemeratoe 67'	Stadium: Euroborg; Attendance: 22,525; Referee: Serdar Gözübüyük

10 May 2025 32	RKC Waalwijk	3–1	SC Heerenveen	Waalwijk
	Margaret 10'; van Gelderen (yellow card) 71'; Oukili 75'; Lokesa 79', {[yel|80}}	Report	Nicolaescu 36' (pen.); Braude (yellow card) 43'; Sebaoui (red card) 56'	Stadium: Mandemakers Stadion; Attendance: 6,128; Referee: Edwin van de Graaf

14 May 2025 33	Feyenoord	2–0	RKC Waalwijk	Rotterdam
	Paixão 45+4'; Ueda 69'	Report		Stadium: De Kuip; Attendance: 47,500; Referee: Marc Nagtegaal

18 May 2025 34	RKC Waalwijk	5–3	Go Ahead Eagles	Waalwijk
	van de Loo 26'; Kramer 48'; Lelieveld (yellow card) 55'; Oukili 70', 90+2'; Ihattaren 81' (pen.)	Report	Stokkers 4'; James (yellow card) 63'; Breum 73'; Linthorst 77'	Stadium: Mandemakers Stadion; Attendance: 6,369; Referee: Alex Bos

=== KNVB Cup ===
30 October 2024 First round	RKC Waalwijk	3–1	SBV Vitesse	Waalwijk
	Margaret 10'; Zawada 30'; Van den Buijs 34'	Report	Yegoian 60'	Stadium: Mandemakers Stadion; Attendance: 3,612; Referee: Martin van den Kerkhof

17 December 2024 Second round	RKC Waalwijk	4–1	SC Cambuur	Waalwijk
	Zawada 14'; van der Water 52'; Oukili 73'; Al Mazyani 84'	Report	Rölke 28'	Stadium: Mandemakers Stadion; Attendance: 3,127; Referee: Richard Wilhelmus Martens

15 January 2025 Round of 16	RKC Waalwijk	1–2	FC Utrecht	Waalwijk
	Margaret 18'	Report	Iqbal (yellow card) 38'; Haller 46', 80'; Jensen (yellow card) 87'	Stadium: Mandemakers Stadion; Attendance: 3,079; Referee: Jeroen Manschot
