= 2023–24 RKC Waalwijk season =

RKC Waalwijk
2023–24 season
- Manager: Henk Fraser
- Stadium: Mandemakers Stadion
- Eredivisie: 15th
- KNVB Cup: First round
- Top goalscorer: League: David Min (10); All: David Min (10)
- Biggest win: Vitesse 0–2 RKC Waalwijk
- Biggest defeat: RKC Waalwijk 0–4 PSV

The 2023–24 season was RKC Waalwijk's 84th season in existence and fifth consecutive in the Dutch top division Eredivisie. They are also competing in the KNVB Cup.

== Players ==
=== First-team squad ===
As of 19 January 2024

Note: Flags indicate national team as defined under FIFA eligibility rules; some limited exceptions apply. Players may hold more than one non-FIFA nationality.

No.	Pos.	Nation	Player
1	GK	SUR	Etienne Vaessen
2	DF	NED	Julian Lelieveld
3	DF	BEL	Dario Van den Buijs
4	DF	BEL	Shawn Adewoye
5	DF	BEL	Thierry Lutonda
6	MF	MAR	Yassin Oukili
7	FW	NED	Denilho Cleonise
8	MF	NED	Patrick Vroegh
9	FW	NED	David Min
10	FW	SRB	Filip Stevanović (on loan from Manchester City)
11	FW	BEL	Zakaria Bakkali
13	GK	NED	Mark Spenkelink
14	MF	BEL	Chris Lokesa
15	MF	NED	Nouri El Harmazi

No.	Pos.	Nation	Player
19	FW	NED	Richonell Margaret
20	FW	BEL	Ilias Takidine
21	GK	NED	Jeroen Houwen
23	DF	CUW	Juriën Gaari
24	MF	CUW	Godfried Roemeratoe
25	DF	NED	Jeffrey Bruma
27	FW	NED	Reuven Niemeijer
28	DF	NED	Aaron Meijers
29	FW	NED	Michiel Kramer (captain)
30	MF	FRA	Daouda Weidmann (on loan from Torino)
31	GK	NED	Joey Kesting
35	MF	CUW	Kevin Felida
—	FW	NED	Mats Seuntjens

=== Out on loan ===
Note: Flags indicate national team as defined under FIFA eligibility rules; some limited exceptions apply. Players may hold more than one non-FIFA nationality.

No.	Pos.	Nation	Player
—	DF	NED	Luuk Wouters (at FC Eindhoven until 30 June 2024)

== Transfers ==
=== In ===
Pos.	Player	Transferred from	Fee	Date	Source
MF	(Netherlands) Denilho Cleonise	(Netherlands) FC Twente	Free	1 July 2023	
DF	(Netherlands) Jeffrey Bruma	(Netherlands) SC Heerenveen	Free	17 July 2023	
MF	(Serbia) Filip Stevanović	(England) Manchester City	Loan	8 August 2023	

=== Out ===
Pos.	Player	Transferred to	Fee	Date	Source
FW	(Netherlands) Mats Seuntjens	(Netherlands) FC Utrecht	Free	1 July 2023	
MF	(Morocco) Iliass Bel Hassani	(Saudi Arabia) Al-Jabalain	Free	8 July 2023	

== Pre-season and friendlies ==
Win Draw Loss Fixtures

1 July 2023 Friendly	Regioteam Waalwijk (Netherlands)	0–12	(Netherlands) RKC Waalwijk
15:30 CEST (UTC+2:00)		Report

8 July 2023 Friendly	RKC Waalwijk (Netherlands)	0–0	(Netherlands) K.V. Kortrijk	Waalwijk, Netherlands
14:00 CEST (UTC+2:00)		Report		Stadium: Sportpark Olympia Waalwijk

15 July 2023 Friendly	RKC Waalwijk (Netherlands)	0–1	(Netherlands) NEC Nijmegen	Waalwijk, Netherlands
13:30 CEST (UTC+2:00)		Report	Nuytinck 2'	Stadium: Sportpark Olympia Waalwijk

19 July 2023 Friendly	NAC Breda (Netherlands)	2–3	(Netherlands) RKC Waalwijk	Breda, Netherlands
19:20 CEST (UTC+2:00)	Van den Bergh 60'; Besselink 90'	Report	Kuijpers 6'; Min 45'; Lokesa 63'	Stadium: Rat Verlegh Stadion

22 July 2023 Friendly	RKC Waalwijk (Netherlands)	0–3	(Germany) SC Paderborn
14:00 CEST (UTC+2:00)		Report

27 July 2023 Friendly	Olympique Marseille (France)	0–1	(Netherlands) RKC Waalwijk
13:00 CEST (UTC+2:00)	Gueye 13'	Report

5 August 2023 Friendly	Sparta Rotterdam (Netherlands)	1–0	(Netherlands) RKC Waalwijk	Rotterdam, Netherlands
13:00 CEST (UTC+2:00)	Adewoye 69' (o.g.)	Report		Stadium: Sparta Stadion Het Kasteel

16 November 2023 Friendly	RKC Waalwijk (Netherlands)	3–5	(Belgium) Cercle Brugge
13:00 CEST (UTC+2:00)

6 January 2024 Friendly	RKC Waalwijk (Netherlands)	1–1	(Morocco) KAC Marrakech
12:00 CEST (UTC+2:00)		Report

== Competitions ==
=== Overall record ===
Competition	First match	Last match	Starting round	Final position	Record							
Competition	First match	Last match	Starting round	Final position	Pld	W	D	L	GF	GA	GD	Win %
Eredivisie	12 August 2023	19 May 2024	Matchday 1		22	5	3	14	20	39	−19	22.73
KNVB Cup	31 October 2023		First round	First round	1	0	0	1	2	3	−1	0.00
Total					23	5	3	15	22	42	−20	21.74

Last updated: 18 February 2024
Source: Soccerway

=== Eredivisie ===
==== League table ====
Pos	Team	Pld	W	D	L	GF	GA	GD	Pts	Qualification or relegation
13	Almere City	34	7	13	14	33	59	−26	34	
14	Heracles Almelo	34	9	6	19	41	74	−33	33	
15	RKC Waalwijk	34	7	8	19	38	56	−18	29	
16	Excelsior (R)	34	6	11	17	50	73	−23	29	Qualification for the Relegation play-off
17	Volendam (R)	34	4	7	23	34	88	−54	19	Relegation to Eerste Divisie

Source: Eredivisie
Rules for classification: Season in progress: 1) Most points won; 2) Less points lost; 3) Goal difference; 4) Goals scored; 5) Alphabetical order; End of season: 1) Points; 2) Goal difference; 3) Goals scored; 4) Head-to-head points; 5) Head-to-head goal difference; 6) Head-to-head away goals scored; 7) Play-off if relevant for deciding champion, relegation or participating in a European league, otherwise by draw. 8) Penalty shoot-out (only after a play-off)
(R) Relegated

==== Results summary ====
Overall								Home						Away					
Pld	W	D	L	GF	GA	GD	Pts	W	D	L	GF	GA	GD	W	D	L	GF	GA	GD
34	7	8	19	38	56	−18	29	4	6	7	20	25	−5	3	2	12	18	31	−13

Last updated: 15 January 2025.
Source: Eredivisie

==== Results by round ====
Round	1	2	3	4	5	6	7	8	9	10	11	12	13	14
Ground	A	H	A	H	A	H	H	A	H	A	H	H	A	H
Result	L	L	L	L	W	W	L	L	W	L	L	L	W	D
Position														

Updated to match(es) played on 6 December 2023. Source: Eredivisie
A = Away; H = Home; W = Win; D = Draw; L = Loss

==== Matches ====
The league fixtures were unveiled on 30 June 2023.

12 August 2023 1	Heerenveen	3–1	RKC Waalwijk	Heerenveen
18:45 CEST (UTC+2)	Nicolaescu 24'; Bochniewicz 30'; Sahraoui 43'	Report	Kramer 60' (pen.); Felida (yellow card) 79'	Stadium: Abe Lenstra Stadion; Attendance: 19,500; Referee: Marc Nagtegaal

20 August 2023 2	RKC Waalwijk	1–3	AZ	Waalwijk
16:45 CEST (UTC+2)	Kramer 41' (pen.), (yellow card) 58'; Margaret (yellow card) 76'	Report	Pavlidis 54', 79'; D. de Wit 59'; Poku (yellow card) 63'	Stadium: Mandemakers Stadion; Attendance: 6,722; Referee: Alex Bos

26 August 2023 3	NEC	3–0	RKC Waalwijk	Nijmegen
18:45 CEST (UTC+2)	Hoedemakers (yellow card) 16'; Mattsson 23', 90'; Rober 90+5'	Report	Min (yellow card) 60'; Oukili (yellow card) 90+1'	Stadium: Goffertstadion; Attendance: 12,319; Referee: Jochem Kamphuis

2 September 2023 4	RKC Waalwijk	0–4	PSV	Waalwijk
20:00 CEST (UTC+2)		Report	Veerman 44'; Lang 53'; De Jong 65'; Tillman 86'	Stadium: Mandemakers Stadion; Attendance: 6,609; Referee: Dennis Johan Higler

16 September 2023 5	Vitesse	0–2	RKC Waalwijk	Arnhem
18:45 CEST (UTC+2)	Manhoef (red card) 60'; Boutrah (yellow card) 72'	Report	Roemeratoe (yellow card) 44'; Oukili 39', (yellow card) 67'; Margaret (yellow card) 78', (goal) 90+6'; Van den Buijs (yellow card) 85'; Vaessen (yellow card) 89'	Stadium: GelreDome; Attendance: 16,362; Referee: Allard Lindhout

24 September 2023 6	RKC Waalwijk	1–0	FC Twente	Waalwijk
16:45 CEST (UTC+2)	Oukili (yellow card) 18'; Stevanović 89'	Report	Vlap (yellow card) 19'	Stadium: Mandemakers Stadion; Attendance: 5,512; Referee: Joey Kooij

7 October 2023 8	Almere City	1–0	RKC Waalwijk	Almere
18:45 CEST (UTC+2)	Robinet 32'; Soh (yellow card) 90+5'	Report	Meijers (yellow card) 36'	Stadium: Yanmar Stadion; Attendance: 4,228; Referee: Jeroen Manschot

21 October 2023 9	RKC Waalwijk	2–1	FC Volendam	Waalwijk
18:45 CEST (UTC+2)	Min 43'; Meijers (yellow card) 52'; Roemeratoe (yellow card) 76'; Oukili 90+2'; Kramer (yellow card) 90+3'	Report	Mbuyamba (yellow card) 28'; Payne (yellow card) 45+1'; Benamar 89'	Stadium: Mandemakers Stadion; Attendance: 6,188; Referee: Edwin van de Graaf

28 October 2024 10	Sparta Rotterdam	2–0	RKC Waalwijk	Rotterdam
20:00 CEST (UTC+2)	Clement (yellow card) 39'; Lauritsen 54' (pen.), (yellow card) 70'; Verschueren 64', (red card) 67'	Report	Roemeratoe (yellow card) 18'	Stadium: Sparta Stadion; Attendance: 10,341; Referee: Sander van der Eijk

4 November 2023 11	RKC Waalwijk	1–2	Feyenoord	Waalwijk
18:45 CET (UTC+1)	Cleonise 25'; Adewoye (red card) 45+2'	Report	Timber 35'; Hartman (yellow card) 42'; Nieuwkoop 64', (yellow card) 90'	Stadium: Mandemakers Stadion; Attendance: 7,186; Referee: Pol Van Boekel

11 November 2023 12	RKC Waalwijk	0–1	Go Ahead Eagles	Waalwijk
18:45 CET (UTC+1)	Meijers (yellow card) 23'	Report	Willumsson 30'	Stadium: Mandemakers Stadion; Attendance: 6,157; Referee: Jeroen Manschot

25 November 2023 13	PEC Zwolle	1–2	RKC Waalwijk	Zwolle
21:00 CET (UTC+1)	Van den Berg 29'; Namli (yellow card) 78'	Report	Stevanović 14', (yellow card) 42'; Lokesa 50'; Kramer (yellow card) 78'	Stadium: Mandemakers Stadion; Attendance: 14,000; Referee: Martin van den Kerkhof

2 December 2023 14	RKC Waalwijk	2–2	Excelsior	Waalwijk
20:00 CET (UTC+1)	Oukili 22', 60'	Report	Driouech 74'; Baas 81'	Stadium: Mandemakers Stadion; Referee: Bas Nijhuis

6 December 2023 7	RKC Waalwijk	2–3	Ajax	Waalwijk
20:00 CET (UTC+1)	Kramer 37'; Oukili 51'	Report	Brobbey 30'; Berghuis 43' (pen.), 57'	Stadium: Mandemakers Stadion; Referee: Pol Van Boekel
Note: The match, which was originally played on September 30, was suspended in the 84th minute due to a collision between the home team's goalkeeper and the visiting team's striker. The remaining minutes will resume with the same score.

10 December 2023 15	Fortuna Sittard	1–0	RKC Waalwijk	Sittard
14:30 CET (UTC+1)	Voet (yellow card) 72'; Noslin 87', (yellow card) 88'	Report	Lelieveld (yellow card) 30'; Gaari (yellow card) 41'	Stadium: Fortuna Sittard Stadion; Attendance: 10,397; Referee: Joey Kooij

16 December 2023 16	FC Utrecht	1–1	RKC Waalwijk	Utrecht
14:30 CET (UTC+1)	Jensen 28'	Report	Kramer 45' (pen.); Oukili (yellow card) 58'; Adewoye (yellow card) 63'; Felida (yellow card) 90+1'; Lokesa (yellow card) 90+5'	Stadium: Stadion Galgenwaard; Attendance: 22,033; Referee: Serdar Gözübüyük

12 January 2024 17	RKC Waalwijk	1–2	Heracles Almelo	Waalwijk
20:00 CET (UTC+1)	Kramer 53' (pen.); Van den Buijs (yellow card) 90'	Report	Engels 59'	Stadium: Mandemakers Stadion; Attendance: 6,412; Referee: Rob Dieperink

21 January 2024 18	AFC Ajax	4–1	RKC Waalwijk	Amsterdam
16:45 CET (UTC+1)	Brobbey 9', 35', (penalty missed) 70'; Tahirović (yellow card) 38'; Hlynsson 64'; Berghuis 87'	Report	Kramer 15'	Stadium: Johan Cruyff Arena; Attendance: 54,514; Referee: Bas Nijhuis

27 January 2024 19	RKC Waalwijk	1–1	Sparta Rotterdam	Waalwijk
18:45 CET (UTC+1)	Gaari (yellow card) 7'; Verschueren 53' (o.g.); Kramer (yellow card) 54'; Van den Buijs (yellow card) 54'; Roemeratoe (red card) 75'; Vaessen (yellow card) 82'; Meijers (yellow card) 87'	Report	Metinho (yellow card) 46'; Verschueren (yellow card) 57'; Kitolano 82' (pen.)	Stadium: Mandemakers Stadion; Attendance: 6,517; Referee: Alex Bos

3 February 2024 20	FC Twente	3–0	RKC Waalwijk	Enschede
16:30 CET (UTC+1)	van Wolfswinkel 21'; Boadu 79'; Taha 81'	Report	Seuntjens (yellow card) 40'	Stadium: De Grolsch Veste; Attendance: 29,700; Referee: Sander van der Eijk

9 February 2024 21	RKC Waalwijk	2–0	NEC Nijmegen	Waalwijk
20:00 CET (UTC+1)	Min 7', 22' (pen.); Van den Buijs (penalty missed) 19'; Meijers (yellow card) 51'; Lelieveld (yellow card) 90+4'	Report	Nuytinck (yellow card) 63'; Sandler (yellow card) 67'; Proper (yellow card) 77'	Stadium: Mandemakers Stadion; Attendance: 6,183; Referee: Jeroen Manschot

18 February 2024 22	Feyenoord	1–0	RKC Waalwijk	Rotterdam
16:45 CET (UTC+1)	Wieffer 84'	Report	Lelieveld (yellow card) 23'; Vaessen (red card) 35'; Niemeijer (yellow card) 35'	Stadium: De Kuip; Attendance: 47,500; Referee: Martin van den Kerkhof

24 February 2024 23	RKC Waalwijk	0–1	Fortuna Sittard	Waalwijk
18:45 CET (UTC+1)		Report	Sierhuis 89'	Stadium: Mandemakers Stadion; Attendance: 6,084; Referee: Joey Kooij

2 March 2024 24	Go Ahead Eagles	1–0	RKC Waalwijk	Deventer
18:45 CET (UTC+1)	Breum 61'	Report	Lelieveld (yellow card) 41'	Stadium: De Adelaarshorst; Attendance: 9,847; Referee: Pol van Boekel

9 March 2024 25	RKC Waalwijk	3–1	Vitesse	Waalwijk
21:00 CET (UTC+1)	Min 28'; Roemeratoe (yellow card) 34'; Niemeijer 71'; Lokesa (yellow card) 83'; Kramer 90+1'	Report	Aaronson 46'	Stadium: Mandemakers Stadion; Attendance: 6,682; Referee: Allard Lindhout

16 March 2024 26	Excelsior	1–1	RKC Waalwijk	Rotterdam
22:00 CEST (UTC+2)	Horemans 28'; de Moes (yellow card) 80'	Report	Van den Buijs (yellow card) 69'; Seuntjens 76'; Roemeratoe (yellow card) 82'	Stadium: Van Donge & De Roo Stadion; Attendance: 4,400; Referee: Edwin van de Graaf

30 March 2024 27	RKC Waalwijk	1–1	SC Heerenveen	Waalwijk
22:00 CEST (UTC+2)	Felida 69'; Meijers (yellow card) 90+2'	Report	van Amersfoort 52'; Bochniewicz (yellow card) 61'	Stadium: Mandemakers Stadion; Attendance: 6,733; Referee: Erwin Blank

3 April 2024 28	RKC Waalwijk	0–0	Almere City	Waalwijk
20:00 CEST (UTC+2)	Roemeratoe (yellow card) 39'; Seuntjens (yellow card) 60'	Report	Barbet (yellow card) 48'	Stadium: Mandemakers Stadion; Attendance: 6,173; Referee: Martin van den Kerkhof

7 April 2024 29	Volendam	3–2	RKC Waalwijk	Volendam
16:45 CEST (UTC+2)	Mühren 14', 22'; Maulun (yellow card) 60'; Johnson 75'; Benamar (yellow card) 90+1'; Karim (yellow card) 90+2'	Report	Niemeijer 55'; Kramer 59'; Gaari (yellow card) 83'; Roemeratoe (yellow card) 90+1'	Stadium: Kras Stadion; Attendance: 6,769; Referee: Serdar Gözübüyük

14 April 2024 30	AZ	3–2	RKC Waalwijk	Alkmaar
18:45 CEST (UTC+2)	Sugawara 66'; Sadiq 75'; Pavlidis 77'; Goes (yellow card) 83'	Report	Min 3', 41', (yellow card) 67'; Lokesa (yellow card) 74'; Vaessen (yellow card) 77'	Stadium: AFAS Stadion; Attendance: 18,309; Referee: Marc Nagtegaal

28 April 2024 31	RKC Waalwijk	2–2	FC Utrecht	Waalwijk
14:30 CEST (UTC+2)	Min 26', (yellow card) 65'; Margaret 66'	Report	El Karouani (yellow card) 59'; Bozdoğan 61', (yellow card) 69'; Lammers 84'	Stadium: Mandemakers Stadion; Attendance: 6,734; Referee: Dennis Johan Higler

5 May 2024 32	Heracles Almelo	0–5	RKC Waalwijk	Almelo
12:15 CEST (UTC+2)	Hoogma (yellow card) 45+2'	Report	Min 7', 67', 82'; Gaari 45', (yellow card) 89'; Adewoye 80'	Stadium: Erve Asito; Attendance: 12,080; Referee: Allard Lindhout

12 May 2024 33	RKC Waalwijk	1–1	PEC Zwolle	Waalwijk
14:30 CEST (UTC+2)	Margaret 90+1'	Report	Thy 61'; Buurmeester (red card) 89'; MacNulty (yellow card) 90+10'	Stadium: Mandemakers Stadion; Attendance: 6,988; Referee: Bas Nijhuis

19 May 2024 34	PSV	3–1	RKC Waalwijk	Eindhoven
14:30 CEST (UTC+2)	De Jong 44', 82' (pen.); Lelieveld 86' (o.g.)	Report	Margaret 16'; Roemeratoe (yellow card) 21'; Oukili (yellow card) 61'; Gaari (yellow card) 75'; Bruma (yellow card) 76' (yellow-red card) 81'	Stadium: Philips Stadion; Attendance: 34,700; Referee: Danny Makkelie

=== KNVB Cup ===
31 October 2023 First round	Utrecht	3–2	RKC Waalwijk	Utrecht
21:00 CET (UTC+1)	Fraulo 7'; Van der Hoorn 17'; Lidberg 30' (pen.)	Report	Lokesa 44', 51'	Stadium: Stadion Galgenwaard; Referee: Laurens Gerrets
