= 2015–16 Feyenoord season =

Feyenoord
2015–16 season
- Chairman: Dick van Well
- Manager: Giovanni van Bronckhorst
- Stadium: De Kuip
- Eredivisie: 3rd
- KNVB Cup: Winners
- Top goalscorer: League: Dirk Kuyt (19); All: Dirk Kuyt (23)
Home colours	Away colours	Third colours

The 2015–16 season was Feyenoord's 108th season of play, marking its 60th season in the Eredivisie and its 94th consecutive season in the top flight of Dutch football. It was the first season with manager Giovanni van Bronckhorst, a former player who played seven seasons for Feyenoord and who played 106 times for Dutch national team. The club started the season relatively well alternating between the second and third place until the halfway point of the season. They then hit a seven-game losing streak among a nine-game stretch without a win and dropped to seventh place. They followed this up with a six-game winning streak to get back to the third position for the final stretch of the season. They ended the season third in the league. Feyenoord entered the KNVB Cup in the second round. They started their campaign by beating both finalist of the 2013–14 edition. They were coupled to past cup winners in all their cup matches and beat FC Utrecht 2–1 in the final. The cup win qualified them to the group stage of the 2016–17 UEFA Europa League.

== Competitions ==
=== Overall ===
Competition	Round started	Final result	First match	Last match
Eredivisie	—	Third	8 August 2015	8 May 2016
KNVB Cup	Second round	Winners	24 September 2015	24 April 2016

Source: Competitions

=== Eredivisie ===
==== League table ====
Pos	Team	Pld	W	D	L	GF	GA	GD	Pts	Qualification or relegation
1	PSV Eindhoven (C)	34	26	6	2	88	32	+56	84	Qualification for the Champions League group stage
2	Ajax	34	25	7	2	81	21	+60	82	Qualification for the Champions League third qualifying round
3	Feyenoord	34	19	6	9	62	40	+22	63	Qualification for the Europa League group stage (Note: Feyenoord qualified for the Europa League group stage by winning the 2015–16 KNVB Cup.)
4	AZ	34	18	5	11	70	53	+17	59	Qualification for the Europa League third qualifying round
5	Utrecht	34	15	8	11	57	48	+9	53	Qualification for the European competition play-offs (Note: Four teams played for one spot in the UEFA Europa League third qualifying round.)

Source: Eredivisie, NUsport, Soccerway
Rules for classification: 1) Points; 2) Goal difference; 3) Goals scored; 4) Head-to-head points; 5) Head-to-head goal difference; 6) Head-to-head away goals scored; 7) Play-off (only if deciding champion, European competitions, or relegation); 8) Draw.
(C) Champions

==== Results summary ====
Overall								Home						Away					
Pld	W	D	L	GF	GA	GD	Pts	W	D	L	GF	GA	GD	W	D	L	GF	GA	GD
34	19	6	9	62	40	+22	63	11	3	3	33	14	+19	8	3	6	29	26	+3

Source: League matches

==== League matches ====
8 August 2015 1	Feyenoord	3 – 2	FC Utrecht	Rotterdam
	Kazim-Richards 22'; Vilhena 77'; Kuyt 81' (pen.)	Report	Haller 75', 90+6' (pen.)	Stadium: De Kuip; Attendance: 47,500; Referee: Blom

16 August 2015 2	SC Cambuur	0 – 2	Feyenoord	Leeuwarden
		Report	Kramer 77'; Kuyt 90+3' (pen.)	Stadium: Cambuur Stadion; Attendance: 10,000; Referee: Van Boekel

23 August 2015 3	Feyenoord	2 – 0	Vitesse	Rotterdam
	Kuyt 77' (pen.); Başaçıkoğlu 79'	Report		Stadium: De Kuip; Attendance: 47,500; Referee: Gözübüyük

30 August 2015 4	PSV	3 – 1	Feyenoord	Eindhoven
	Lestienne 37'; Arias 50'; Locadia 81' (pen.)	Report	Bruma 4' (o.g.)	Stadium: Philips Stadion; Attendance: 35,000; Referee: Kuipers

13 September 2015 5	Feyenoord	1 – 0	Willem II	Rotterdam
	Elia 68'	Report		Stadium: De Kuip; Attendance: 47,500; Referee: Liesveld

20 September 2015 6	Roda JC	1 – 1	Feyenoord	Kerkrade
	Faik 27'	Report	Kramer 20'	Stadium: Parkstad Limburg Stadion; Attendance: 17,142; Referee: Van Boekel

27 September 2015 7	Feyenoord	2 – 0	PEC Zwolle	Rotterdam
	Kuyt 54'; Elia 82'	Report		Stadium: De Kuip; Attendance: 47,500; Referee: Kuipers

4 October 2015 8	De Graafschap	1 - 2	Feyenoord	Doetinchem
	Van Beek 14' (o.g.)	Report	Kramer 50'; Elia 70'	Stadium: De Vijverberg; Attendance: 12,145; Referee: Makkelie

18 October 2015 9	SC Heerenveen	2 – 5	Feyenoord	Heerenveen
	Veerman 59', 81'	Report	Kuyt 7', 32', 39'; Kramer 16'; Gustafson 28'	Stadium: Abe Lenstra Stadion; Attendance: 25,350; Referee: Gözübüyük

25 October 2015 10	Feyenoord	3 – 1	AZ	Rotterdam
	Kuyt 13', 59', 77' (pen.)	Report	Van Overeem 18'	Stadium: De Kuip; Attendance: 47,500; Referee: Kuipers

1 November 2015 11	ADO Den Haag	1 – 0	Feyenoord	The Hague
	Van Beek 69' (o.g.)	Report		Stadium: Kyocera Stadion; Attendance: 14,261; Referee: Blom

8 November 2015 12	Feyenoord	1 – 1	Ajax	Rotterdam
	Van Beek 38'	Report	Klaassen 59'	Stadium: De Kuip; Attendance: 47,500; Referee: Nijhuis

22 November 2015 13	Feyenoord	5 – 0	FC Twente	Rotterdam
	Gustafson 7', 26'; Kramer 46'; El Ahmadi 50'; Başaçıkoğlu 90+2'	Report		Stadium: De Kuip; Attendance: 47,500; Referee: Liesveld

28 November 2015 14	Excelsior	2 – 4	Feyenoord	Rotterdam
	Van Mieghem 44'; Van Weert 86'	Report	Kuyt 2'; Kramer 36', 55', 71'	Stadium: Stadion Woudestein; Attendance: 3,750; Referee: Braamhaar

6 December 2015 15	Feyenoord	3 – 0	Heracles Almelo	Rotterdam
	Elia 31'; Kuyt 83'; Kramer 90'	Report		Stadium: De Kuip; Attendance: 47,500; Referee: Nijhuis

13 December 2015 16	FC Groningen	1 – 1	Feyenoord	Groningen
	De Leeuw 25'	Report	Kuyt 50'	Stadium: Euroborg; Attendance: 22,091; Referee: Van Boekel

20 December 2015 17	N.E.C.	3 – 1	Feyenoord	Nijmegen
	Bikel 60'; Limbombe 65'; Santos 85'	Report	Vilhena 20'	Stadium: Stadion de Goffert; Attendance: 12,500; Referee: Blom

17 January 2016 18	Feyenoord	0 – 2	PSV	Rotterdam
		Report	Moreno 49'; Narsingh 84'	Stadium: De Kuip; Attendance: 47,500; Referee: Makkelie

24 January 2016 19	AZ	4 – 2	Feyenoord	Alkmaar
	Henriksen 23'; Janssen 26', 53', 55'	Report	Kramer 12'; Vilhena 72'	Stadium: AFAS Stadion; Attendance: 15,217; Referee: Liesveld

28 January 2016 20	Feyenoord	1 – 2	SC Heerenveen	Rotterdam
	Achahbar 71'	Report	Veerman 39'; Van den Berg 84'	Stadium: De Kuip; Attendance: 47,500; Referee: Van Boekel

31 January 2016 21	Feyenoord	0 – 2	ADO Den Haag	Rotterdam
		Report	Jansen 41'; Zuiverloon 59'	Stadium: De Kuip; Attendance: 47,500; Referee: Makkelie

7 February 2016 22	Ajax	2 – 1	Feyenoord	Amsterdam
	Younes 21'; Bazoer 65'	Report	Toornstra 13'	Stadium: Amsterdam Arena; Attendance: 51,875; Referee: Blom

14 February 2016 23	PEC Zwolle	3 – 1	Feyenoord	Zwolle
	Veldwijk 15', 50'; Ehizibue 90+3'	Report	Van Beek 41'	Stadium: IJsseldelta Stadion; Attendance: 12,500; Referee: Gözübüyük

21 February 2016 24	Feyenoord	1 – 1	Roda JC	Rotterdam
	Kuyt 45'	Report	Ngombo 69'	Stadium: De Kuip; Attendance: 47,500; Referee: Liesveld

28 February 2016 25	FC Utrecht	1 – 2	Feyenoord	Utrecht
	Haller 4'	Report	Vilhena 19'; Kuyt 44'	Stadium: Stadion Galgenwaard; Attendance: 18,512; Referee: Van Boekel

6 March 2016 26	Feyenoord	3 – 1	SC Cambuur	Rotterdam
	Toornstra 36'; Kuyt 79'; Elia 85'	Report	Barto 70'	Stadium: De Kuip; Attendance: 47,500; Referee: Higler

13 March 2016 27	Vitesse	0 – 2	Feyenoord	Arnhem
		Report	Kramer 73'; Başaçıkoğlu 88'	Stadium: GelreDome; Attendance: 18,834; Referee: Kuipers

19 March 2016 28	Feyenoord	3 – 1	De Graafschap	Rotterdam
	Kramer 55'; Elia 76'; Bouma 82' (o.g.)	Report	Pröpper 26'	Stadium: De Kuip; Attendance: 47,000; Referee: Nijhuis

2 April 2016 29	Feyenoord	3 – 0	Excelsior	Rotterdam
	Kuyt 21', 59'; Elia 33'	Report		Stadium: De Kuip; Attendance: 46,500; Referee: Liesveld

10 April 2016 30	FC Twente	0 – 1	Feyenoord	Enschede
		Report	Kramer 13'	Stadium: De Grolsch Veste; Attendance: 27,600; Referee: Gözübüyük

16 April 2016 31	Feyenoord	1 – 1	FC Groningen	Rotterdam
	Vilhena 65'	Report	De Leeuw 24'	Stadium: De Kuip; Attendance: 47,500; Referee: Higler

20 April 2016 32	Heracles Almelo	2 – 2	Feyenoord	Almelo
	Gosens 11'; Weghorst 49'	Report	Kramer 39'; Elia 73'	Stadium: Polman Stadion; Attendance: 12,024; Referee: Makkelie

1 May 2016 33	Willem II	0 – 1	Feyenoord	Tilburg
		Report	Achahbar 57'	Stadium: Koning Willem II Stadion; Attendance: 13,670; Referee: Vink

8 May 2016 34	Feyenoord	1 – 0	N.E.C.	Rotterdam
	Kuyt 55'	Report		Stadium: De Kuip; Attendance: 47,500; Referee: Janssen

Source: Royal Dutch Football Association

=== KNVB Cup ===
24 September 2015 Second round	Feyenoord	3 – 0	PEC Zwolle	Rotterdam
	Marcellis 19' (o.g.); Kuyt 60', 69'	Report		Stadium: De Kuip; Attendance: 47,500; Referee: Nijhuis

28 October 2015 Third round	Feyenoord	1 – 0	Ajax	Rotterdam
	Veltman 90+5' (o.g.)	Report		Stadium: De Kuip; Attendance: 47,500; Referee: Van Boekel

17 December 2015 Fourth round	Feyenoord	2 – 1 (a.e.t.)	Willem II	Rotterdam
	Vilhena 88'; Kuyt 119' (pen.)	Report	Andersen 25'	Stadium: De Kuip; Attendance: 47,500; Referee: Janssen

3 February 2016 Quarter-final	Roda JC	0 – 1 (a.e.t.)	Feyenoord	Kerkrade
		Report	Botteghin 105'	Stadium: Parkstad Limburg Stadion; Attendance: 12,595; Referee: Janssen

3 March 2016 Semi-final	Feyenoord	3 – 1	AZ	Rotterdam
	Henriksen 15' (o.g.); Kramer 78'; Kuyt 85' (pen.)	Report	Henriksen 46'	Stadium: De Kuip; Attendance: 47,500; Referee: Makkelie

24 April 2016 Final	Feyenoord	2 – 0	FC Utrecht	Rotterdam
	Kramer 42'; Bednarek 75' (o.g.)	Report		Stadium: De Kuip; Attendance: 45,592; Referee: Kuipers

=== Friendlies ===
4 July 2015	SC Feyenoord	0 – 3	Feyenoord	Rotterdam
		Report	Başaçıkoğlu 12'; Achahbar 21'; Immers 26'	Stadium: Sportcomplex Varkenoord; Attendance: 1,500; Referee: Ruperti

8 July 2015	SV Kematen	1 – 8	Feyenoord	Kematen in Tirol
	Kuen 86'	Report	Schuurman 3', 31', 60'; Te Vrede 30', 57', 67'; Dammers 73'; Manu 80'	Stadium: Sportplatz Kematen

12 July 2015	Fortuna Düsseldorf	0 - 2	Feyenoord	Kufstein
		Report	Kazim-Richards 27'; El Ahmadi 80'	Stadium: Kufstein Arena

18 July 2015 (Note: This game was banned as originally planned, because of the objections of the mayor of Bergen op Zoom. The match was allowed to be played with the new opponent.)	Feyenoord	Cancelled	FC Dordrecht	Halsteren
				Stadium: Sportpark De Beek

18 July 2015	VVV-Venlo	2 – 1	Feyenoord	Halsteren
	Resida 18', 33'	Report	Toornstra 19'	Stadium: Sportpark De Beek; Referee: Lindhout

23 July 2015	Feyenoord	0 – 3	Southampton F.C.	Rotterdam
		Report	Pellè 40'; Yoshida 61'; Juanmi 83'	Stadium: De Kuip; Referee: Janssen

1 August 2015	Feyenoord	1 – 3	Olympiacos F.C.	Rotterdam
	Kuyt 62' (pen.)	Report	Jara 6'; Pardo 24'; Fortounis 45'	Stadium: De Kuip; Referee: Van Boekel

8 January 2016 (Note: Feyenoord played Charleroi in a game lasting three times 45 minutes.)	Feyenoord	3 – 3	Charleroi	Albufeira
	Kuyt 46' (?); Başaçıkoğlu (?)	Report	Perbet (?); Benavente (?)	Stadium: Amendoeira Golf Resort

24 March 2016 Hartstichting charity match	Feyenoord	2 – 0	Sparta Rotterdam	Rotterdam
	Gustafson 23'; Toornstra 83' (pen.)	Report		Stadium: De Kuip; Referee: Van Boekel
