= Godfried Roemeratoe =

Footballer (born 1999)

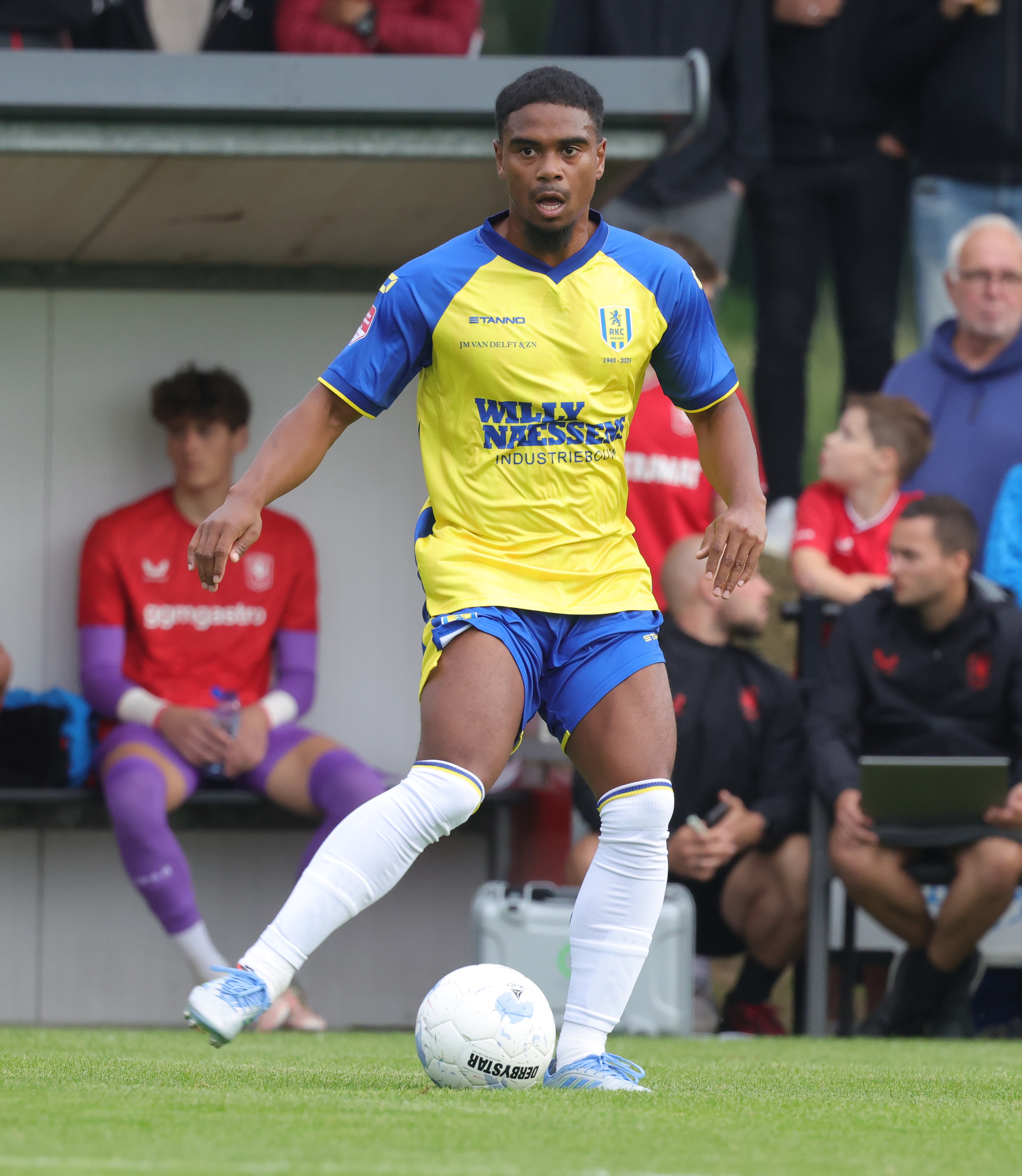
- Roemeratoe with RKC Waalwijk in 2025

Personal information
- Date of birth: 19 August 1999 (age 27)
- Place of birth: Oost-Souburg, Netherlands
- Height: 1.78 m (5 ft 10 in)
- Positions: Defensive midfielder; right-back

Team information
- Current team: Voluntari
- Number: 80

Youth career
- 2005–2012: RCS
- –2014: JVOZ
- 2014–2018: Twente

Senior career*
Years	Team	Apps	(Gls)
2017–2020	Jong FC Twente	42	(0)
2018–2022	Twente	48	(0)
2021–2022	→ Willem II (loan)	21	(1)
2022–2023	Hapoel Tel Aviv	24	(0)
2023–2026	RKC Waalwijk	86	(1)
2026–	Voluntari	3	(1)

International career^{‡}
2015	Netherlands U17	3	(0)
2019	Netherlands U20	3	(0)
2023–	Curaçao	29	(1)
- * Club domestic league appearances and goals as of 2 November 2026 ‡ National team caps and goals as of 21 June 2026

Godfried Roemeratoe (born 19 August 1999) is a professional footballer who plays as a defensive midfielder or right-back for Liga I club Voluntari. Born in the Netherlands, he plays for the Curaçao national team.

== Club career ==
Roemeratoe made his Eerste Divisie debut for FC Twente on 21 December 2018 in a game against N.E.C. as a 90th-minute substitute for Matthew Smith.

On 23 August 2021, he joined Willem II on loan for the 2021–22 season.

== International career ==
In March 2023, Roemeratoe received his first call-up to the Curaçao senior national team for the Nations League match against Canada and the friendly against Argentina.

On 18 May 2026, he was named by head coach Dick Advocaat in the 26-man squad for the 2026 FIFA World Cup, marking the country's first-ever appearance at the tournament.

== Personal life ==
Godfried is of Indonesian descent from his family name "Roemeratoe" which originates from Seram in the Maluku Islands.

== Career statistics ==
=== Club ===
As of match played 2 November 2026

Appearances and goals by club, season and competition
Club	Season	League			National cup (Note: Includes KNVB Beker, Israel State Cup, Cupa României)		Other		Total	
Club	Season	Division	Apps	Goals	Apps	Goals	Apps	Goals	Apps	Goals
Jong FC Twente	2017–18	Derde Divisie	31	0	—		—		31	0
Jong FC Twente	2018–19	Beloften Eredivisie	7	0	—		—		7	0
Jong FC Twente	2019–20	Beloften Eerste Divisie	4	0	—		—		4	0
Jong FC Twente	Total		42	0	—		—		42	0
Twente	2018–19	Eerste Divisie	3	0	0	0	—		3	0
Twente	2019–20	Eredivisie	15	0	1	0	—		16	0
Twente	2020–21	Eredivisie	30	0	1	0	—		31	0
Twente	2021–22	Eredivisie	0	0	—		—		0	0
Twente	Total		48	0	2	0	—		50	0
Willem II (loan)	2021–22	Eredivisie	21	1	1	0	—		22	1
Hapoel Tel Aviv	2022–23	Israeli Premier League	24	0	1	0	5 (Note: Appearances in Toto Cup)	0	30	0
RKC Waalwijk	2023–24	Eredivisie	29	0	0	0	—		29	0
RKC Waalwijk	2024–25	Eredivisie	25	1	1	0	—		26	1
RKC Waalwijk	2025–26	Eerste Divisie	32	0	2	0	3 (Note: Appearances in Eredivisie promotion/relegation play-offs)	0	37	0
RKC Waalwijk	Total		86	1	3	0	3	0	92	1
Voluntari	2026–27	Liga I	3	1	1	0	—		4	1
Career total			224	3	8	0	8	0	240	3

=== International ===
As of match played 20 June 2026

Appearances and goals by national team and year
National team	Year	Apps	Goals
Curaçao	2023	9	1
Curaçao	2024	6	0
Curaçao	2025	10	0
Curaçao	2026	4	0
Total		29	1

Scores and results list Curaçao's goal tally first, score column indicates score after each Roemeratoe goal.

List of international goals scored by Godfried Roemeratoe
No.	Date	Venue	Opponent	Score	Result	Competition	Ref.
1	17 October 2023	Ergilio Hato Stadium, Willemstad, Curaçao	Trinidad and Tobago	2–0	5–3	2023–24 CONCACAF Nations League A	

== Honours ==
Twente

- Eerste Divisie: 2018–19
