= Michiel Kramer =

Dutch footballer (born 1988)

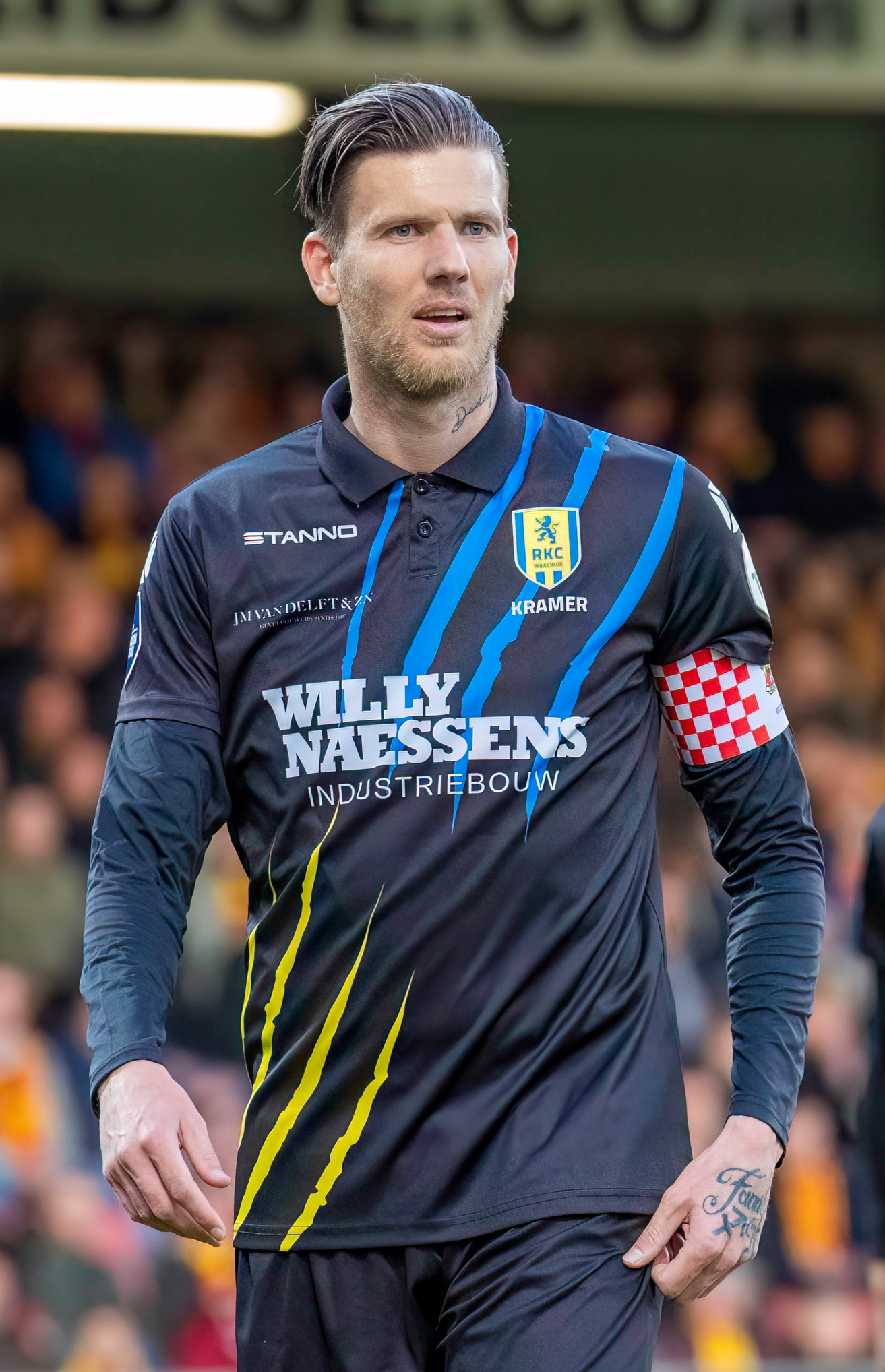
- Kramer with RKC Waalwijk in 2023

Personal information
- Date of birth: 3 December 1988 (age 37)
- Place of birth: Rotterdam, Netherlands
- Height: 1.95 m (6 ft 5 in)
- Position: Forward

Team information
- Current team: RKC Waalwijk
- Number: 29

Youth career
- XerxesDZB
- Excelsior
- NAC Breda

Senior career*
Years	Team	Apps	(Gls)
2007–2009	NAC Breda	11	(0)
2009–2013	Volendam	105	(39)
2013–2015	ADO Den Haag	58	(24)
2015–2018	Feyenoord	55	(18)
2018	Sparta Rotterdam	8	(2)
2018–2019	Maccabi Haifa	4	(0)
2019	Utrecht	8	(1)
2019–2021	ADO Den Haag	42	(8)
2021–2026	RKC Waalwijk	124	(35)
- * Club domestic league appearances and goals

Michiel Kramer (born 3 December 1988) is a Dutch former professional footballer who played as a forward for NAC Breda, FC Volendam, ADO Den Haag, Feyenoord, Sparta Rotterdam, Maccabi Haifa, FC Utrecht and RKC Waalwijk. His main position was forward but he also played as a second striker.

== Career ==
Kramer was born in Rotterdam. He joined FC Volendam from NAC Breda in June 2009. He scored his first goal on 4 December 2009 in an away match against FC Emmen in a 4–2 win, actually with Kramer scoring a clean hattrick. In 2013 Kramer joined ADO Den Haag.

=== ADO Den Haag ===
In 2013 Kramer joined ADO Den Haag. In 2014 Kramer had one of his best scoring in ratio to games, scoring 11 goals in 17 matches.

=== Feyenoord ===
On 7 August 2015, it was announced that Kramer signed a contract with hometown club Feyenoord, who he has supported since his childhood. Kramer made his Feyenoord-debut on 16 August 2015, in an away game against SC Cambuur, coming on as a substitute in the 62nd minute. With the score still at 0–0, Kramer opened the scoring 15 minutes later, therefore scoring on his debut to secure what would be a 2–0 victory for Feyenoord. On 1 February 2018, it was announced that Kramer had been released from his contract.

=== Sparta Rotterdam ===
On 12 February 2018, Kramer signed a contract for the remainder of the season at Sparta Rotterdam. This contract was cancelled again on 19 April 2018, after Kramer received a red card in Sparta's 7–0 defeat against Vitesse for kicking Vitesse player Alexander Büttner in the face. The resulting suspension was for seven games costing him the remaining matches of the season. Kramer played eight games for Sparta Rotterdam, scoring twice.

=== Maccabi Haifa ===
On 30 May 2018, it was reported that Kramer would continue his career at Maccabi Haifa in the Israeli Premier League. On his first league match for the Israeli side, Kramer was suspended for foul language.

=== FC Utrecht ===
On 23 January 2019, he returned to the Netherlands, signing for FC Utrecht on a free transfer.

=== Return to ADO Den Haag ===
Kramer returned to ADO Den Haag in July 2019 on a two-year contract.

=== RKC Waalwijk ===
On 20 July 2021, Kramer signed for fellow Eredivisie side RKC Waalwijk on a free transfer.

== Career statistics ==
As of match played 7 December 2024

Appearances and goals by club, season and competition
Club	Season	League			National Cup		Europe		Other		Total	
Club	Season	Division	Apps	Goals	Apps	Goals	Apps	Goals	Apps	Goals	Apps	Goals
NAC Breda	2008–09	Eredivisie	11	0	2	0	—		0	0	13	0
FC Volendam	2009–10	Eerste Divisie	21	5	0	0	—		0	0	21	5
FC Volendam	2010–11	Eerste Divisie	27	7	3	0	—		2 (Note: Appearance(s) in Eredivisie relegation play-offs)	0	32	7
FC Volendam	2011–12	Eerste Divisie	25	5	2	0	—		0	0	27	5
FC Volendam	2012–13	Eerste Divisie	32	22	1	0	—		3	1	36	23
FC Volendam	Total		105	39	6	0	0	0	5	1	116	40
ADO Den Haag	2013–14	Eredivisie	26	7	2	0	—		0	0	28	7
ADO Den Haag	2014–15	Eredivisie	32	17	1	0	—		0	0	33	17
ADO Den Haag	Total		58	24	3	0	0	0	0	0	61	24
Feyenoord	2015–16	Eredivisie	30	14	5	2	—		0	0	35	16
Feyenoord	2016–17	Eredivisie	17	4	2	1	4 (Note: Appearance(s) in UEFA Europa League)	0	1 (Note: Appearance(s) in Johan Cruyff Shield)	0	24	5
Feyenoord	2017–18	Eredivisie	8	0	2	2	2 (Note: Appearance(s) in UEFA Champions League)	0	0	0	12	2
Feyenoord	Total		55	18	9	5	6	0	1	0	71	23
Sparta Rotterdam	2017–18	Eredivisie	8	2	0	0	0	0	0	0	8	2
Maccabi Haifa	2018–19	Israeli Premier League	4	0	5	1	0	0	0	0	9	1
FC Utrecht	2018–19	Eredivisie	8	1	0	0	—		2 (Note: Appearance(s) in Eredivisie Europa League play-offs)	0	10	1
ADO Den Haag	2019–20	Eredivisie	13	2	0	0	—		0	0	13	2
ADO Den Haag	2020–21	Eredivisie	29	6	1	0	—		0	0	30	6
ADO Den Haag	Total		42	8	1	0	0	0	0	0	43	2
RKC Waalwijk	2021–22	Eredivisie	31	11	1	0	—		—		32	11
RKC Waalwijk	2022–23	Eredivisie	27	12	0	0	—		—		27	12
RKC Waalwijk	2023–24	Eredivisie	29	8	1	0	—		—		30	8
RKC Waalwijk	2024–25	Eredivisie	11	0	0	0	—		—		11	0
RKC Waalwijk	Total		98	31	2	0	—		—		100	31
Career total			389	123	28	6	6	0	8	1	431	130

== Honours ==
Feyenoord

- Eredivisie: 2016–17
- KNVB Cup: 2015–16
- Johan Cruyff Shield: 2017

Individual

- Eredivisie Team of the Month: August 2021, January 2022, April 2023
