= Jamil Takidine =

Belgian footballer (born 2002)

Personal information
- Date of birth: 1 June 2002 (age 24)
- Place of birth: Genk, Belgium
- Height: 1.70 m (5 ft 7 in)
- Positions: Midfielder; right-back

Team information
- Current team: Thes Sport
- Number: 22

Youth career
- –2021: Genk

Senior career*
Years	Team	Apps	(Gls)
2021–2023	Roda JC	16	(0)
2023–2025	Bocholt	52	(2)
2025–	Thes Sport	21	(0)

International career
2019	Belgium U18	2	(0)
- * Club domestic league appearances and goals as of 3 May 2026

Jamil Takidine (born 1 June 2002) is a Belgian professional footballer who plays as a midfielder for Belgian Division 1 club Thes Sport. Born in Belgium, he is of Moroccan descent.

== Club career ==
Takidine came through the youth academy at his hometown club Genk in Belgium, before joining Eerste Divisie club Roda JC on 12 August 2021 after a successful trial. He made his professional debut on 13 August 2021, replacing Stefano Marzo in the 83rd minute of a home match for Roda against Excelsior in the Eerste Divisie. Takidine made his first starting appearance in Roda's 2–1 win over Den Bosch in the KNVB Cup on 26 October 2021.

In August 2022, Takidine signed a new professional contract with Roda until 2024 despite missing three months of the previous season with injury. Roda head coach Jurgen Streppel said of Takidine: "Jamil has shown that he has willpower and perseverance. He is a hard worker and he gives everything every day to get better."

On 28 August 2023, Takidine's contract with Roda was terminated by mutual consent. He subsequently signed with Belgian club Bocholt.

In March 2025, Takidine was announced as Thes Sport's new signing ahead of the 2025–26 season.

== International career ==
Takidine is a youth international for Belgium, having made two appearances for the Belgium under-18 team. He made his debut for the team on 15 November 2019 in a friendly against the Czech Republic.

== Personal life ==
Takidine was born in Belgium and is of Moroccan descent.

His younger brother Ilias Takidine is also a professional footballer, who came through the Genk youth system before joining Anderlecht in 2020, where he played for the club's reserve team.

== Career statistics ==
As of match played 10 September 2025

Appearances and goals by club, season and competition
Club	Season	League			National cup		Other		Total	
Club	Season	Division	Apps	Goals	Apps	Goals	Apps	Goals	Apps	Goals
Roda JC	2021–22	Eerste Divisie	9	0	1	0	0	0	10	0
Roda JC	2022–23	Eerste Divisie	7	0	0	0	0	0	7	0
Roda JC	Total		16	0	1	0	0	0	17	0
Bocholt	2023–24	Belgian Division 2	26	1	0	0	—		26	1
Bocholt	2024–25	Belgian Division 2	26	1	0	0	—		26	1
Bocholt	Total		52	2	0	0	0	0	52	2
Thes Sport	2025–26	Belgian Division 1	2	0	1	0	—		3	0
Career total			70	2	2	0	0	0	72	2
