= Woubrugge =

- Village
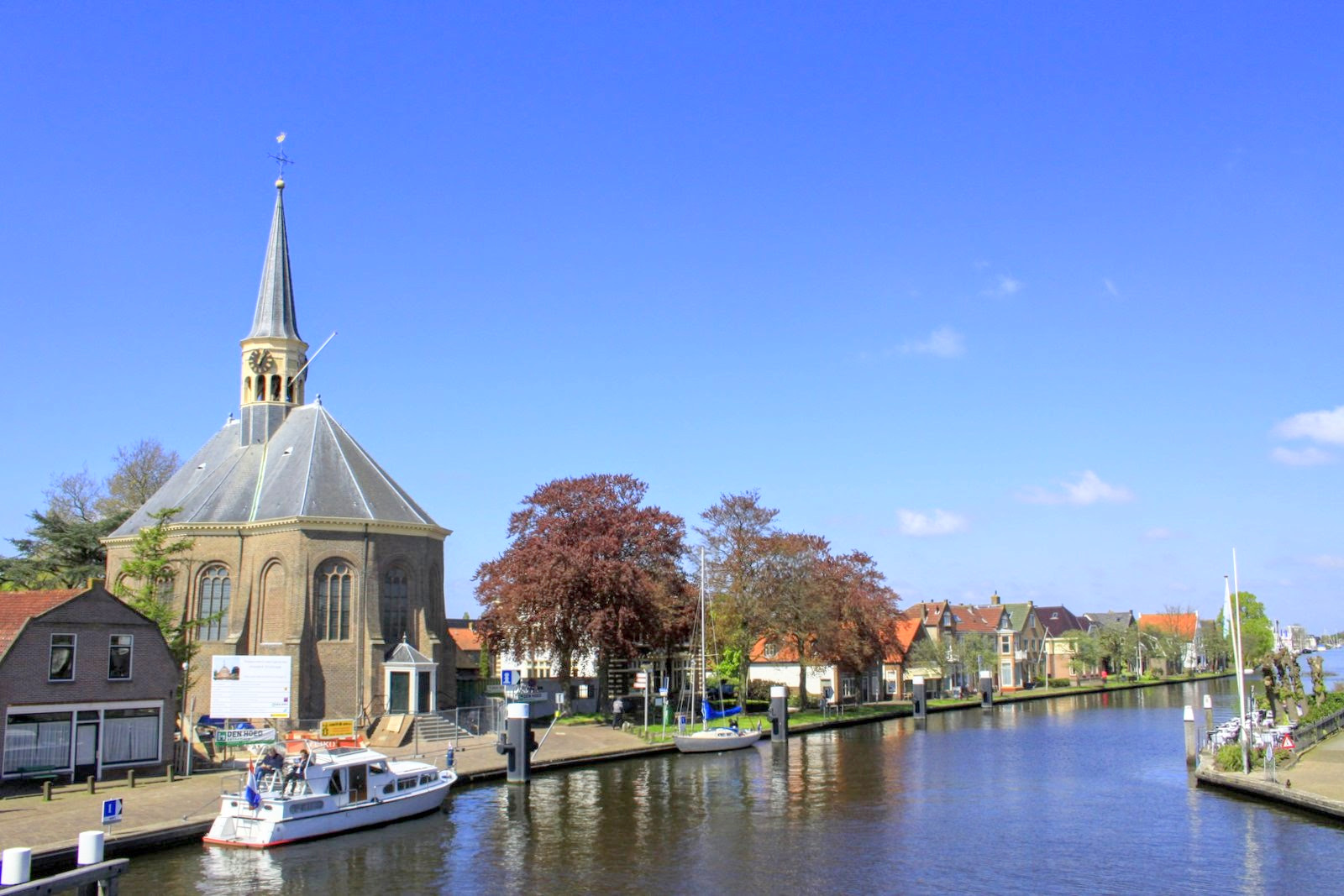
- View on Woubrugge

- Location in the province of South Holland in the Netherlands Location in the Netherlands
- Coordinates: 52°10′N 4°38′E
- Country: Netherlands
- Province: South Holland
- Municipality: Kaag en Braassem

Area
  - Total: 1.09 km^{2} (0.42 sq mi)
- Elevation: −1.8 m (−5.9 ft)

Population (2021)
  - Total: 2,970
  - Density: 2,720/km^{2} (7,060/sq mi)
- Time zone: UTC+1 (CET)
  - Summer (DST): UTC+2 (CEST)
- Postal code: 2481
- Dialing code: 0172
- Major roads: N446 N207

Woubrugge is a village in the Dutch province of South Holland. It is located about 10 km east of the city of Leiden, in the municipality of Kaag en Braassem.

== History ==
The village was first mentioned in 1493 as Woubregge, and means "bridge over the Woudwetering". The Woutbroeke mentioned in 1252 is a different settlement. Woubrugge started as a peat excavation settlement, but turned into a linear agricultural settlement along the Woudwetering.

The Dutch Reformed church is a pseudo cruciform church between 1652 and 1653 and designed by Pieter Post. It has a twelve sided ridge turret with needle spire.

Woubrugge was home to 932 people in 1840. It was a separate municipality until 1991, when it became part of Jacobswoude. In 2009, it became part of the municipality of Kaag en Braassem.

== Notable residents ==
- Henk Angenent, former professional ice skater. Lives in Woubrugge
- Margot Boer, professional ice skater, winner of two bronze medals on 2014 Winter Olympics.
- Joey Kesting, professional footballer who currently plays for RKC Waalwijk.
- Hans Vijlbrief, civil servant, economist, and minister of finance from 2020 – 2022. Lives in Woubrugge.

== Gallery ==
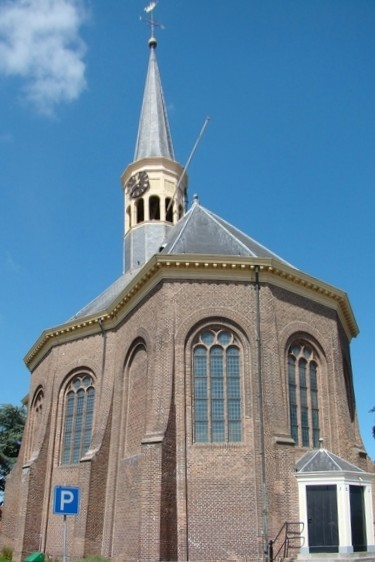
Church of Woubrugge

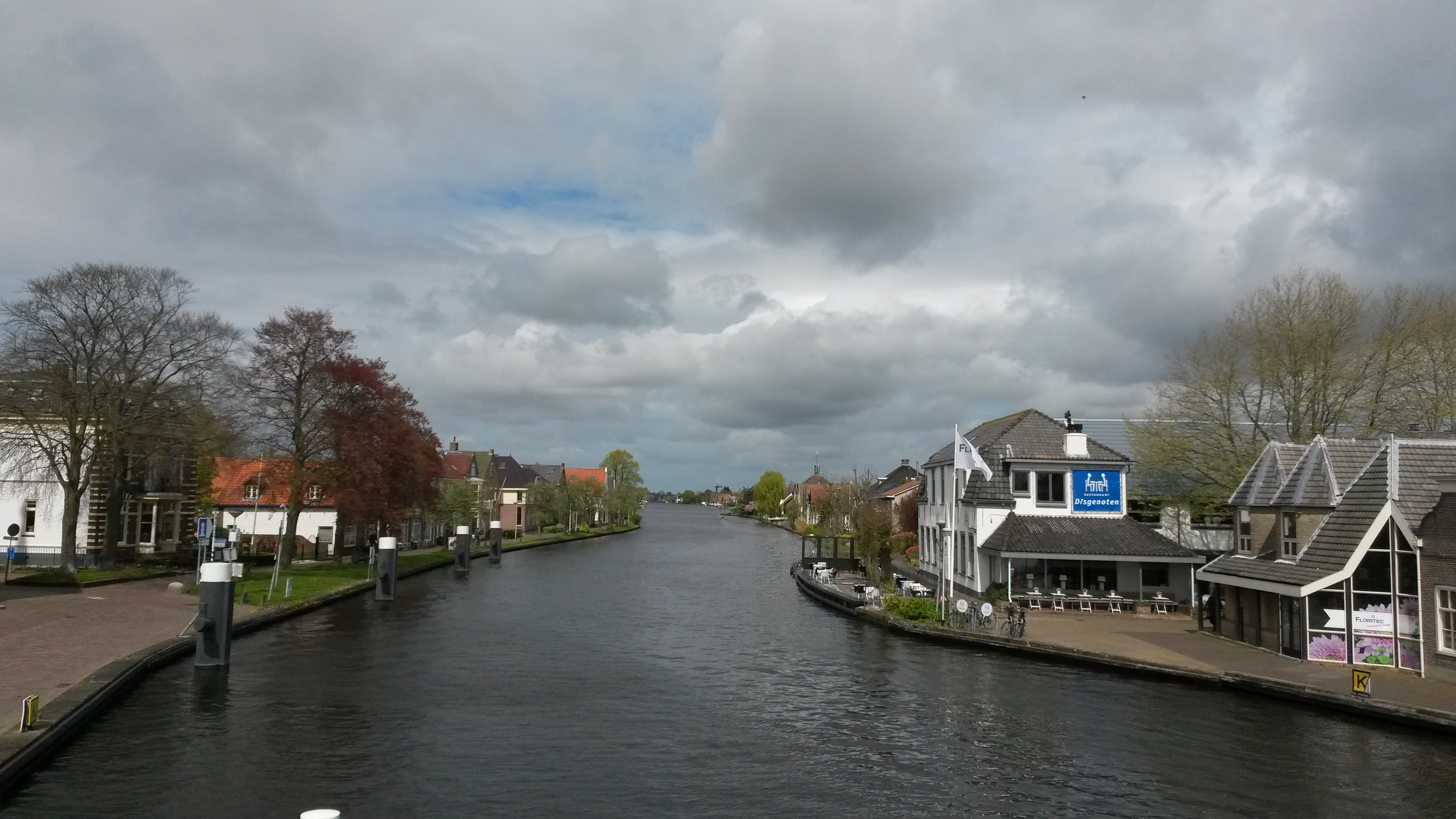
Canal view

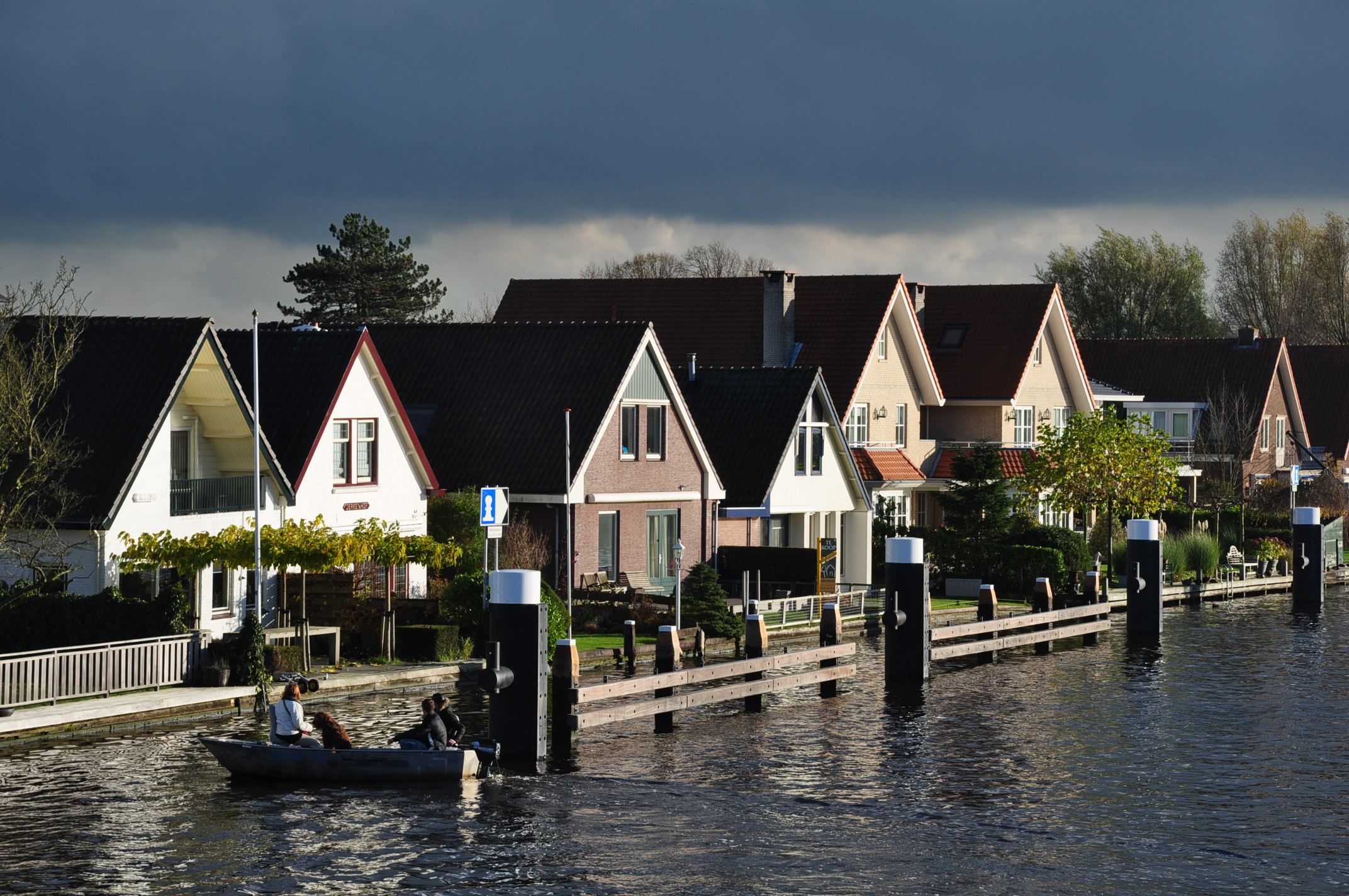
Houses in Woubrugge

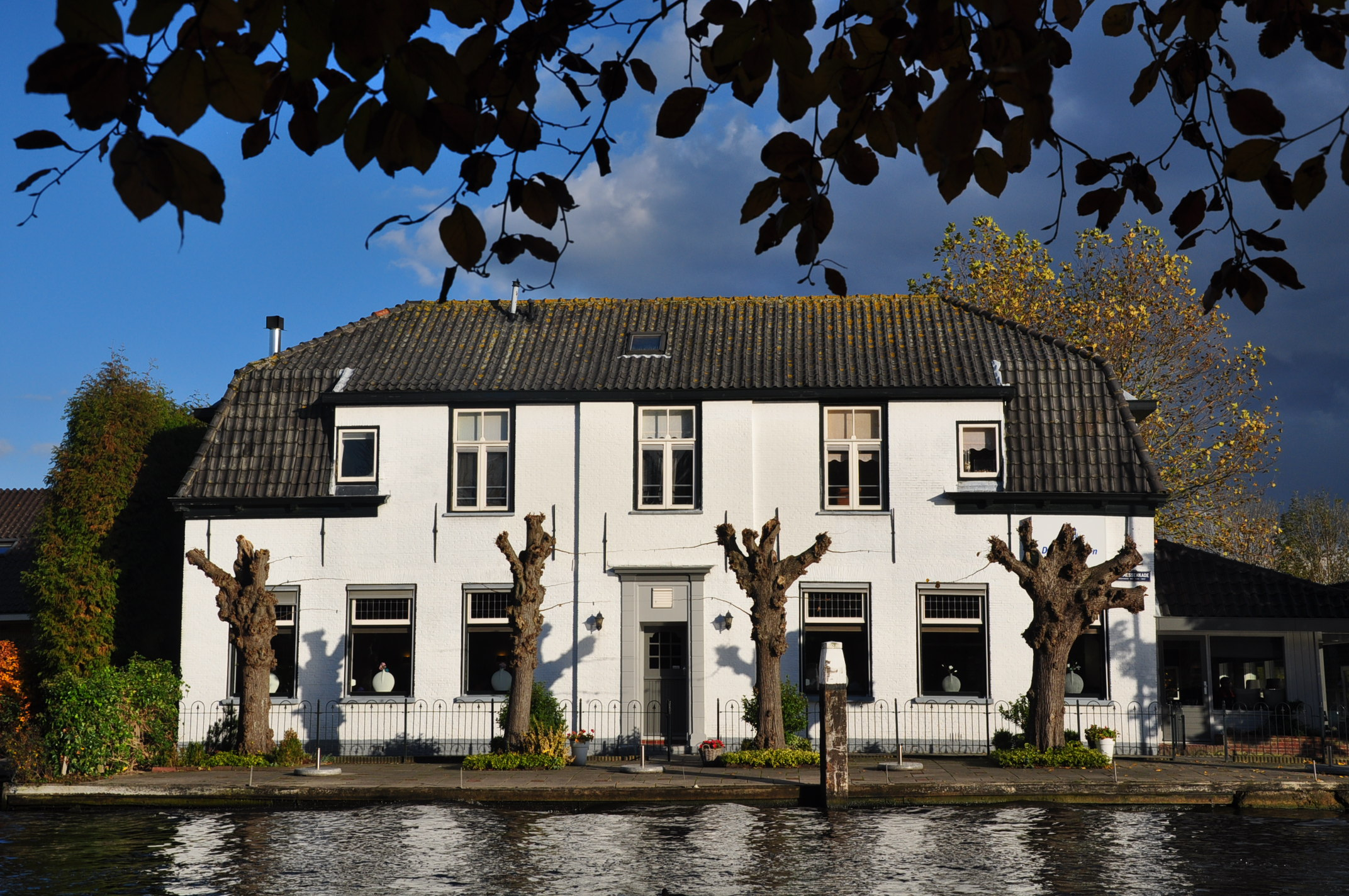
House in Woubrugge
