= Richonell Margaret =

Surinamese footballer (born 2000)

Personal information
- Full name: Richonell Lenoy Margaret
- Date of birth: 7 July 2000 (age 26)
- Place of birth: Heerhugowaard, Netherlands
- Height: 1.91 m (6 ft 3 in)
- Position: Forward

Team information
- Current team: Go Ahead Eagles
- Number: 18

Youth career
- –2009: De Foresters
- 2009–2018: Ajax
- 2018–2019: Vitesse

Senior career*
Years	Team	Apps	(Gls)
2019	Vitesse	4	(0)
2019–2022	Jong AZ	43	(7)
2021–2022	→ TOP Oss (loan)	24	(1)
2022–2023	TOP Oss	21	(1)
2023–2025	RKC Waalwijk	58	(9)
2025–	Go Ahead Eagles	25	(1)

International career^{‡}
2025–	Suriname	17	(4)
- * Club domestic league appearances and goals as of 29 August 2026 ‡ National team caps and goals as of 5 October 2026

Richonell Lenoy Margaret (born 7 July 2000) is a professional footballer who plays as forward for Eredivisie club Go Ahead Eagles. Born in the Netherlands, he plays for the Suriname national team.

== Career ==
Margaret played youth football for De Foresters and Ajax, and moved to Vitesse's academy in 2018, where he signed a contract until 2022. He made his professional debut for Vitesse on 18 January 2019, in a 3–2 home win over Excelsior, coming on for Oussama Darfalou in the 72nd minute. Margaret made a total of five appearances for the club.

On 13 July 2019, Margaret signed a three-year contract with AZ, initially joining the reserve team Jong AZ.

Ahead of the 2021–22 season, Margeret moved to TOP Oss on a one-season loan deal. He made his debut in 13 August in a 2–1 home win over VVV-Venlo, coming on as a late substitute for Jearl Margaritha.

On 4 September 2022, Margaret signed a permanent contract with TOP Oss, penning a two-year deal.

On 26 June 2023, Margaret joined RKC Waalwijk on a two-year contract, with an optional third year.

== Personal life ==
Born in the Netherlands, Margaret is of Surinamese descent.

== Career statistics ==
=== Club ===
As of match played 29 August 2026

Appearances and goals by club, season and competition
Club	Season	League			KNVB Cup		Europe		Other		Total	
Club	Season	Division	Apps	Goals	Apps	Goals	Apps	Goals	Apps	Goals	Apps	Goals
Vitesse	2018–19	Eredivisie	4	0	0	0	—		—		4	0
Jong AZ	2019–20	Eerste Divisie	17	4	—		—		—		17	4
Jong AZ	2020–21	Eerste Divisie	25	2	—		—		—		25	2
Jong AZ	2021–22	Eerste Divisie	1	1	—		—		—		1	1
Jong AZ	Total		43	7	—		—		—		43	7
TOP Oss (loan)	2021–22	Eerste Divisie	24	1	1	0	—		—		25	1
TOP Oss	2022–23	Eerste Divisie	21	1	1	0	—		—		22	1
RKC Waalwijk	2023–24	Eredivisie	24	4	0	0	—		—		24	4
RKC Waalwijk	2024–25	Eredivisie	34	5	3	2	—		—		37	7
RKC Waalwijk	Total		58	9	3	2	—		—		61	11
Go Ahead Eagles	2025–26	Eredivisie	22	1	2	0	6 (Note: Appearances in UEFA Europa League)	0	1 (Note: Appearance in Johan Cruyff Shield)	0	31	1
Go Ahead Eagles	2026–27	Eredivisie	3	0	0	0	—		—		3	0
Go Ahead Eagles	Total		25	1	2	0	6	0	1	0	34	1
Career total			172	19	7	2	6	0	1	0	185	21

=== International ===
As of match played 5 October 2026

Appearances and goals by national team and year
National team	Year	Apps	Goals
Suriname	2025	13	4
Suriname	2026	4	0
Total		17	4

Scores and results list Suriname's goal tally first, score column indicates score after each Margaret goal.

List of international goals scored by Richonell Margaret
No.	Date	Venue	Opponent	Score	Result	Competition
1	15 June 2025	Snapdragon Stadium, San Diego, United States	Costa Rica	2–2	3–4	2025 CONCACAF Gold Cup
2	14 October 2025	Rommel Fernández Stadium, Panama City, Panama	Panama	1–0	1–1	2026 FIFA World Cup qualification
3	13 November 2025	Franklin Essed Stadion, Paramaribo, Suriname	El Salvador	2–0	4–0	2026 FIFA World Cup qualification
4	13 November 2025	Franklin Essed Stadion, Paramaribo, Suriname	El Salvador	3–0	4–0	2026 FIFA World Cup qualification
