= Mohamed Ihattaren =

Dutch footballer (born 2002)

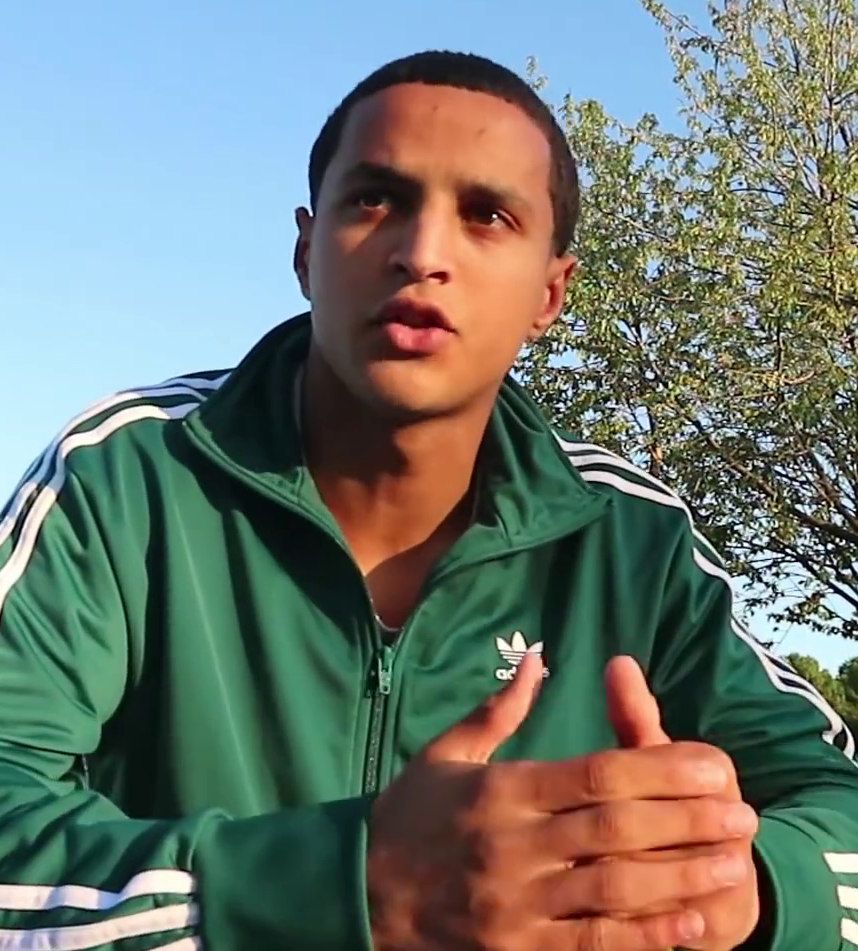
- Ihattaren in 2020

Personal information
- Full name: Mohamed Amine Ihattaren
- Date of birth: 12 February 2002 (age 24)
- Place of birth: Utrecht, Netherlands
- Height: 1.83 m (6 ft 0 in)
- Positions: Attacking midfielder; winger

Team information
- Current team: Fortuna Sittard
- Number: 52

Youth career
- 2009–2010: SV Houten
- 2010–2019: PSV

Senior career*
| Years | Team | Apps | (Gls) |
| 2019 | Jong PSV | 3 | (3) |
| 2019–2021 | PSV | 56 | (6) |
| 2021–2023 | Juventus | 0 | (0) |
| 2021 | → Sampdoria (loan) | 0 | (0) |
| 2022 | → Ajax (loan) | 0 | (0) |
| 2022 | → Jong Ajax (loan) | 5 | (4) |
| 2024 | Slavia Prague | 0 | (0) |
| 2024–2025 | RKC Waalwijk | 24 | (4) |
| 2025– | Fortuna Sittard | 39 | (10) |

International career^{‡}
| 2017 | Netherlands U15 | 4 | (1) |
| 2017 | Netherlands U16 | 4 | (3) |
| 2018 | Netherlands U17 | 12 | (1) |
| 2018–2019 | Netherlands U19 | 10 | (2) |
Medal record
Representing Netherlands
UEFA European Under-17 Championship
| Winner | England 2018 | U-17 Team |
- * Club domestic league appearances and goals as of 22:27, 16 November 2026 (UTC) ‡ National team caps and goals as of 17:43, 28 April 2022 (UTC)

Mohamed Amine Ihattaren (Arabic: محمد أمين إحتاراين; born 12 February 2002) is a professional footballer who plays as an attacking midfielder or winger for Eredivisie club Fortuna Sittard. Born in the Netherlands, he represented his country of birth at youth international levels before opting to play for the Morocco national team in 2025.

== Early life ==
Ihattaren was born in Utrecht and grew up in the Kanaleneiland district with around 16,000 inhabitants, mainly with Moroccan background. Many international footballers are also from there, including Ibrahim Afellay and Ismaïl Aissati. Being born in the Netherlands to Moroccan parents, he possesses both Dutch and Moroccan passports. He has four brothers and a sister. His father, Mostapha Ihattaren (died in October 2019), arrived in Utrecht in the 1980s from Rouadi, a city located close to Al Hoceima in the Rif region of northern Morocco. Ihattaren was enrolled by his father at the local football club SV Houten club in Utrecht in 2009.

Under the coaching of Henry Vermeulen, he appeared in all matches during his year at SV Houten. Vermeulen stated in 2018: "His ball handling, his dribbling and his vision were impressive. He was nicknamed "Ibi" due to his playing style resembling that of Ibrahim Afellay".

== Club career ==
=== PSV Eindhoven ===
==== 2018–19 season ====
A youth product of PSV Eindhoven since 2010, Ihattaren signed his first professional contract with PSV on 28 March 2018. Ihattaren made his professional debut for PSV in a 2–1 Eredivisie win over FC Groningen on 26 January 2019, coming on as a late substitute for Gastón Pereiro. He became the fourth-youngest player to make his debut for PSV, behind Stanley Bish, Wilfred Bouma and Willy Janssen.

Ihattaren made four appearances for the first team before making his debut for reserve team Jong PSV in the second-tier Eerste Divisie on 22 February 2019, in a 2–2 home draw against Roda JC Kerkrade. In that game, he scored his first senior goal.

Ihattaren had made eight appearances for the first team when head coach Mark van Bommel definitively promoted him to the first-team squad in March 2019. There, he went on to compete for a spot as an attacking midfielder with Gastón Pereiro and Érick Gutiérrez.

==== 2019–20 season ====
Ihattaren scored his first goal for PSV's first team on 18 August 2019, netting to close the game with a 2–0 final score Heracles Almelo. His first European goal followed four days after, when he scored the opener in a 3–0 win in the UEFA Europa League qualifier against Apollon Limassol.

Ihattaren scored his second goal in the Eredivisie on 7 December 2019, in a 5–0 win over Fortuna Sittard. He scored from a penalty in the 52nd minute and dedicated the goal to his father, who had died two months earlier. By scoring the penalty, Ihattaren became the youngest player ever to score on a penalty-kick in the Eredivisie (17 years and 298 days). He broke the record of Ronald Koeman, who was 17 years and 325 days at the time of his first successful penalty-kick. Ihattaren became a starter in the first team of PSV during the 2019–20 season.

==== 2020–21 season ====
In the first half of the 2020–21 season, Ihattaren lost his place in the starting lineup under new head coach Roger Schmidt. Only in December 2020, he emerged from his slump of form. In February 2021, however, tensions broke out again between Schmidt and Ihattaren, and the latter's attitude was questioned.

On 31 July 2021, Ihattaren was axed from the squad for disciplinary reasons as he was officially absent from practice with PSV due to illness. Instead, he was spotted at the Nice training ground together with his agent Mino Raiola.

=== Juventus ===
On 31 August 2021, Ihattaren joined Serie A side Juventus, signing a four-year contract.

==== Loan to Sampdoria ====
After signing with Juventus, he was promptly loaned to fellow-Serie A club Sampdoria on a one-year deal. On 12 September, Ihattaren made his first bench appearance in a 2–2 draw against Inter Milan, without making his debut. In October 2021 – only a month and a half after his arrival – Ihattaren had still not made his debut for the club, and reports of 'adaptation issues' arose, despite Ihattaren having been assigned a personal assistant in Italy to support him with practical matters, in addition to his own manager José Fortes Rodríguez, the man who has been guiding him on behalf of his agent Mino Raiola for several years. Allegedly, Sampdoria were fed up with his behaviour and lack of professionalism. He had practiced individually for a long time to regain his fitness in Genoa, but regularly visited acquaintances in Monaco and Milan, cities about two and a half hours drive from Genoa. He returned to the Netherlands for "personal reasons" on 14 October 2021. Ihattaren ended his experience at Sampdoria with only one bench appearance and he was never fielded onto the pitch.

==== Loan to Ajax ====
On 12 January 2022, it was reported that Ihattaren was working on his fitness with Gerald Vanenburg in order to facilitate a re-entry into professional football. Initial reports speculated a return to his hometown club FC Utrecht. On 30 January it was confirmed that Ajax had loaned him from Juventus for one year with an option to buy set at €2 million. On 11 March, after still having not made his debut for the club, manager Erik ten Hag expressed his disappointment with Ihattaren's physical improvement in recent weeks: "If you can't run, it ends there".

On 1 April, Ihattaren first appeared for Jong Ajax, AFC Ajax's youth team competing in the Eerste Divisie league, in a 0–0 draw against NAC Breda, which marked his first competitive game in almost a year. Three days later, Ihattaren played his first game with Jong Ajax as a starter and scored a goal against TOP Oss, helping his side win 4–1. On 17 April, Ihattaren debuted for the first team during the 2022 KNVB Cup Final loss against PSV, his former team, coming on as a substitute in the 86th minute. On 25 April, he scored a hat-trick in ten minutes in Jong Ajax's 6–1 win against VVV-Venlo.

On 31 October 2022, Ajax notified Juventus of their intention not to exercise the purchase option on Ihattaren's contract, his loan being set to expire on 3 January 2023.

=== Samsunspor ===
On 28 July 2023, Ihattaren mutually rescinded his contract with Juventus, thus becoming a free agent without having played a single game for the Bianconeri.

On 1 August 2023, Ihattaren signed a four-year contract with recently promoted Süper Lig side Samsunspor. However, two days later, the move to the Turkish side fell through due to unacceptable demands, and Samsunspor walked away from the deal.

=== Slavia Prague ===
On 4 December 2023, Ihattaren joined Czech First League club Slavia Prague, signing a one-year contract with an optional three-year extension. On 30 January 2024, Slavia announced on Twitter that following a pre-season camp in Portugal, Ihattaren would join their reserve team, where he would continue to work on his fitness.

On 31 March 2024, Ihattaren's contract was terminated by mutual consent having failed to make an appearance for the club.

=== RKC Waalwijk ===
On 19 September 2024, Eredivisie club RKC Waalwijk announced the signing of Ihattaren on a contract until the end of the season. He made his competitive return on 29 September, appearing as a substitute in the 80th minute of a 2–0 home defeat to his former club, Ajax, marking his first official match in over two years. On 29 November, he scored his first goal for the club, converting a stoppage-time penalty to secure a 1–1 away draw against Heerenveen. He scored his first goal from open play on 11 January 2025, netting a late consolation in a 2–1 league defeat to Ajax. He found the net again on 2 February, delivering a standout performance in RKC's 4–1 away victory over Almere City in a relegation battle.

=== Fortuna Sittard ===
On 14 August 2025, Ihattaren joined Eredivisie side Fortuna Sittard, signing a one-year contract with an option for an additional year.

== International career ==
Born in Utrecht, Netherlands, Ihattaren is a youth international for the Netherlands, and was a member of the Netherlands U17s who won the 2018 UEFA European Under-17 Championship. In November 2019 he committed his international future to the Netherlands national team. Ihattaren was called up to the senior Netherlands squad for the UEFA Nations League matches against Poland and Italy in September 2020.

On 3 October 2025, FIFA approved Ihattaren's request to change his sporting nationality from Dutch to Moroccan, making him eligible to play for the Morocco national team.

== Style of play ==
A quick and skilful midfielder, Ihattaren is mainly as a playmaker but can play most attacking positions. Instinctive and skilled in passing, he has been compared to fellow countryman Memphis Depay.

== Personal life ==
In 2022, Ihattaren came under fire for his alleged ties and connections to the Dutch criminal underworld: he was accused of having ties to the Mocro Maffia (a powerful criminal organization made up of criminals who are Moroccan or of Moroccan descent), after one of the alleged members of the organization (who is on trial in connection with the notorious Marengo trial) arrived at the courthouse in a car belonging to Ihattaren, which led Dutch authorities to investigate and discover that Ihattaren is a friend and associate of some high-ranking members of this powerful criminal group. According to journalist John van den Heuvel of De Telegraaf, Ihattaren had also dated a girl who was related to a family tied to the Mocro Maffia. Because of all this controversy, he began to receive death threats on social media, and Ajax, his team at the time, tried to terminate his contract before the end of the 2022–23 Eredivisie season.

On 12 February 2023, his 21st birthday, Ihattaren was arrested in Amsterdam on charges of domestic abuse against his girlfriend, Yasmine Driouech. He was released two days later but remained under investigation as a suspect. He married Driouech in May 2023. In January 2024, it was confirmed that Ihattaren would face prosecution for the assault, as well as for an earlier charge of making threats in November 2022. He was later sentenced to 60 hours of community service.

== Career statistics ==
As of match played 7 November 2026

Appearances and goals by club, season and competition
| Club | Season | League | | | National cup (Note: Includes KNVB Cup, Coppa Italia) | | Europe | | Other | | Total | |
| Club | Season | Division | Apps | Goals | Apps | Goals | Apps | Goals | Apps | Goals | Apps | Goals |
|---|---|---|---|---|---|---|---|---|---|---|---|---|
| Jong PSV | 2018–19 | Eerste Divisie | 2 | 1 | — | | — | | — | | 2 | 1 |
| Jong PSV | 2019–20 | Eerste Divisie | 1 | 2 | — | | — | | — | | 1 | 2 |
| Jong PSV | Total | | 3 | 3 | — | | — | | — | | 3 | 3 |
| PSV | 2018–19 | Eredivisie | 12 | 0 | 0 | 0 | 0 | 0 | 0 | 0 | 12 | 0 |
| PSV | 2019–20 | Eredivisie | 22 | 3 | 2 | 1 | 9 (Note: Appearances in UEFA Europa League) | 3 | 0 | 0 | 33 | 7 |
| PSV | 2020–21 | Eredivisie | 22 | 3 | 3 | 0 | 4 | 0 | — | | 29 | 3 |
| PSV | Total | | 56 | 6 | 5 | 1 | 13 | 3 | 0 | 0 | 74 | 10 |
| Juventus | 2021–22 | Serie A | 0 | 0 | 0 | 0 | 0 | 0 | 0 | 0 | 0 | 0 |
| Juventus | 2022–23 | Serie A | 0 | 0 | 0 | 0 | 0 | 0 | 0 | 0 | 0 | 0 |
| Juventus | Total | | 0 | 0 | 0 | 0 | 0 | 0 | 0 | 0 | 0 | 0 |
| Sampdoria (loan) | 2021–22 | Serie A | 0 | 0 | 0 | 0 | — | | — | | 0 | 0 |
| Ajax (loan) | 2021–22 | Eredivisie | 0 | 0 | 1 | 0 | — | | — | | 1 | 0 |
| Jong Ajax (loan) | 2021–22 | Eerste Divisie | 5 | 4 | — | | — | | — | | 5 | 4 |
| RKC Waalwijk | 2024–25 | Eredivisie | 24 | 4 | 3 | 0 | — | | — | | 27 | 4 |
| Fortuna Sittard | 2025–26 | Eredivisie | 28 | 6 | 2 | 0 | — | | — | | 30 | 6 |
| Fortuna Sittard | 2026–27 | Eredivisie | 11 | 4 | 0 | 0 | — | | — | | 11 | 4 |
| Fortuna Sittard | Total | | 39 | 10 | 2 | 0 | — | | — | | 41 | 10 |
| Career total | | | 128 | 27 | 10 | 1 | 13 | 3 | 0 | 0 | 151 | 31 |

== Honours ==
PSV

- Johan Cruyff Shield: 2021

Netherlands U17

- UEFA European Under-17 Championship: 2018

Individual

- UEFA European Under-17 Championship Team of the Tournament: 2018
- Eredivisie Team of the Month: February 2025
