= Stan Van den Buys =

Belgian footballer

Stan Van den Buijs
Personal information
- Full name: Constant Van den Buijs
- Date of birth: 8 June 1957 (age 69)
- Place of birth: Kalmthout, Belgium

Senior career*
Years	Team	Apps	(Gls)
–1978	KFC Wuustwezel		
1978–1982	Berchem Sport		
1982–1991	Lierse		
1991–1992	Molenbeek		
1992–1994	KV Mechelen		
1994–1996	Germinal Ekeren		

Managerial career
- 1996–1998: KFC Rita Berlaar
- 1998–1999: KFC Schoten
- 2008: Standard Liège (assistant manager)
- 2008–2010: Gent (assistant manager)
- 2010–2011: Beerschot (assistant manager)
- 2010: Beerschot (interim manager)
- 2012–2013: Al-Shabab (assistant manager)
- 2013–2017: Club Brugge (assistant manager)
- 2023–: KFC Ranst
- * Club domestic league appearances and goals

Constant "Stan" Van den Buijs (born 8 June 1957) is a Belgian retired football player.

== Own goals ==
Some sources mention that he was the first player to score three own goals which were not deliberate in the same match, in a 2–3 loss for his team, Germinal Ekeren, against Anderlecht on 22 January 1995 in the Belgian first division, but this was not confirmed because the third goal was considered to have been scored by Johan Walem, who touched the ball before it crossed the goal line after it was diverted into the goal by Van den Buys.

== Personal life ==
His son Dario Van den Buijs plays professionally in the Netherlands.
