= Luuk Vogels =

Dutch footballer (born 2003)

Personal information
- Date of birth: 6 July 2003 (age 23)
- Height: 6 ft 3 in (1.91 m)
- Position: Goalkeeper

Team information
- Current team: RKC Waalwijk
- Number: 31

Senior career*
Years	Team	Apps	(Gls)
2022–2024	OJC Rosmalen	0	(0)
2024–	RKC Waalwijk	0	(0)
- * Club domestic league appearances and goals as of 9 February 2026

Luuk Vogels (born 6 July 2003) is a Dutch professional footballer who currently plays as a goalkeeper for Eerste Divisie club RKC Waalwijk.

== Career ==
=== OJC Rosmalen ===
Vogels played for Dutch club OJC Rosmalen from 2022 to 2024.

=== RKC Waalwijk ===
Vogels joined RKC Waalwijk in 2024. Vogels has yet to make an appearance for Waalwijk in the league, but has played for the club in the KNVB Cup, as well as appearing on the bench. In 2025, Vogels was injured during Waalwijk's relegation battle that season.
