= Faissal Al Mazyani =

Moroccan footballer (born 2005)

Personal information
- Date of birth: 18 January 2005 (age 21)
- Place of birth: Antwerp, Belgium
- Height: 1.80 m (5 ft 11 in)
- Position: Right-back

Team information
- Current team: RKC Waalwijk
- Number: 33

Youth career
- Waasland-Beveren
- 2015–2022: Genk

Senior career*
| Years | Team | Apps | (Gls) |
| 2022–2024 | Jong Genk | 46 | (1) |
| 2024– | RKC Waalwijk | 30 | (0) |

International career^{‡}
| 2022 | Belgium U17 | 5 | (1) |
| 2022 | Belgium U18 | 1 | (0) |
| 2023– | Morocco U20 | 12 | (1) |
| 2023 | Morocco U23 | 2 | (0) |
- * Club domestic league appearances and goals as of 25 April 2026 ‡ National team caps and goals as of 01:19, 27 March 2025 (UTC)

Faissal Al Mazyani (Arabic: فيصل المزياني; born 18 January 2005) is a professional football player who plays as a right-back for RKC Waalwijk. Born in Belgium, he is a youth international for Morocco.

== Career ==
Al Mazyani is a product of the youth academies of the Belgian clubs Waasland-Beveren and Genk. On 17 May 2021, he signed his first professional contract with Genk at the age of 16 for 3 seasons. He started playing with their reserves, Jong Genk in the Challenger Pro League in 2022. On 10 November 2023, he extended his contract with Genk until 2025. On 2 September 2024, he transferred to the Dutch Eredivisie club RKC Waalwijk on a 3-year contract. He was named the Johan Cruyff Talent of the Month in January 2025.

== International career ==
Born in Belgium, Al Mazyani is of Moroccan descent and holds dual-citizenship. He is a former youth international for Belgium, having played for the Belgium U17s and U18s. In 2023, he switched to play for Morocco international and played for the Morocco U20s at the 2023 Maurice Revello Tournament.

== Honours ==
Individual

- Eredivisie Talent of the Month: January 2025
- Eredivisie Team of the Month: January 2025
