= Joey Kesting =

Dutch footballer (born 2001)

Personal information
- Date of birth: March 7, 2001 (age 25)
- Place of birth: Woubrugge, Netherlands
- Height: 6 ft 3 in (1.91 m)
- Position: Goalkeeper

Team information
- Current team: RKC Waalwijk
- Number: 13

Youth career
- vv Woubrugge
- –2015: Alphense Boys
- 2015–2020: Vitesse

Senior career*
Years	Team	Apps	(Gls)
2020–2022	PEC Zwolle	0	(0)
2022–2025	RKC Waalwijk	3	(0)
2025–	VV Katwijk	0	(0)
- * Club domestic league appearances and goals as of 01:54, 16 August 2025 (UTC)

Joey Kesting (born 7 March 2001) is a Dutch professional footballer who currently plays for Tweede Divisie club VV Katwijk as a goalkeeper. He formerly played in the youth system of SBV Vitesse as well as professionally for PEC Zwolle, later appearing for RKC Waalwijk in the Eredivisie.

== Early life ==
Kesting was born on 7 March 2001 in Woubrugge, Netherlands. He started his career at local club vv Woubrugge, where he played as a striker. When his team had no goalkeeper, he became their goalkeeper. He proved his prowess in the position, with Alphense Boys signing him six months later. In the four years that he was a goalkeeper at Alphense Boys, Kesting also had trials at Feyenoord and Sparta Rotterdam.

Eventually, the Kesting chose to join Vitesse at the age of 15 in 2015, where he played until 2020, before signing with PEC Zwolle.

== Professional career ==
=== RKC Waalwijk ===
After spending his youth career at Vitesse, and a six-month spell at PEC Zwolle, Kesting was signed by RKC Waalwijk during their 2022 summer transfer window, which included six other transfers. General manager Frank van Mosselveld said that "[Kesting] is a goalkeeping talent. He fits the RKC profile of a young, ambitious player and he will get the chance to develop himself further here next season."

After two seasons with no appearances for Waalwijk, he had his first league start in the 2024–25 season.

=== VV Katwijk ===
Kesting jointed Tweede Divisie club VV Katwijk in the summer of 2025.
