= Yassin Oukili =

Moroccan footballer (born 2001)

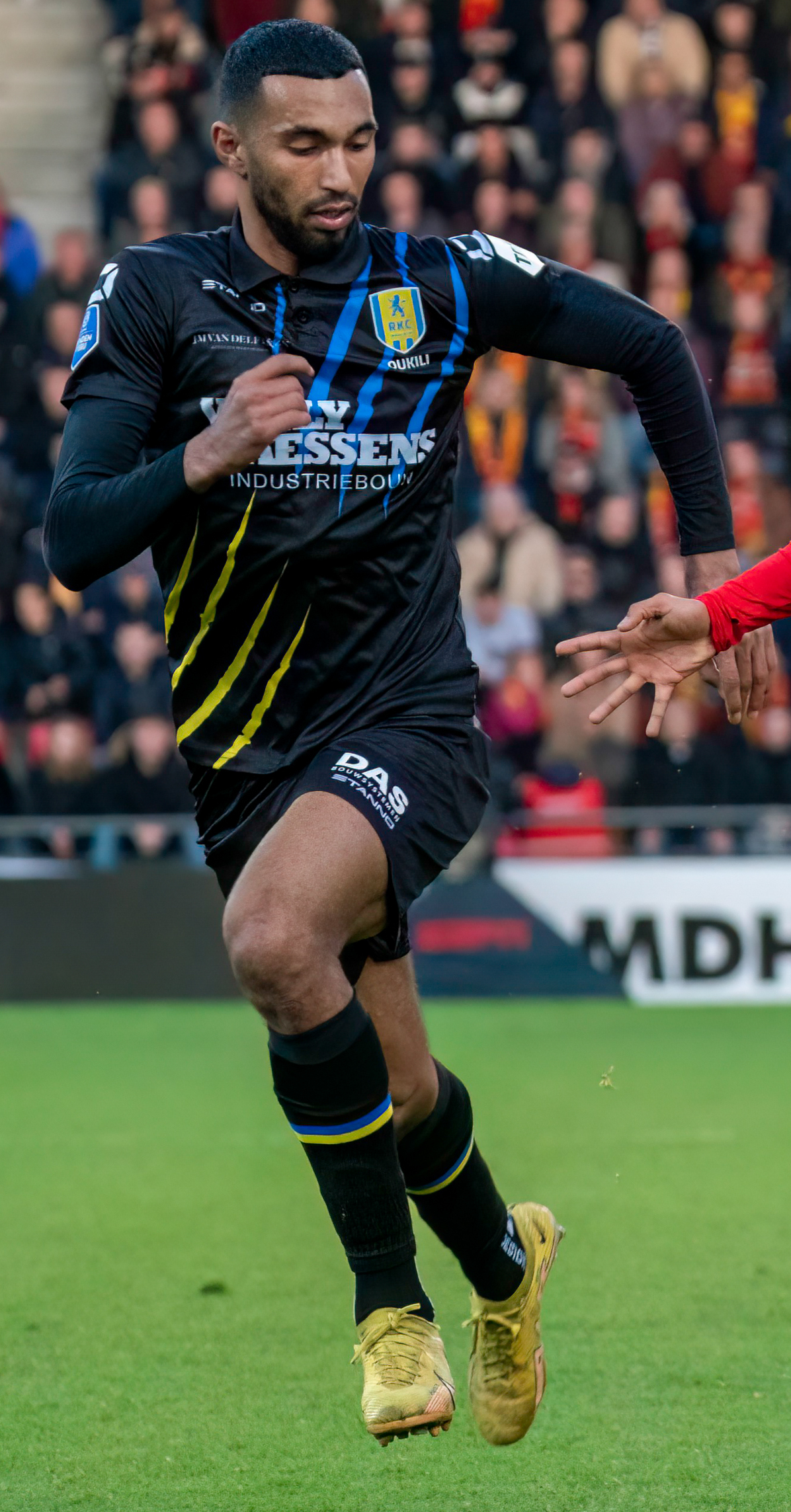

Personal information
- Date of birth: 3 January 2001 (age 25)
- Place of birth: Amersfoort, Netherlands
- Height: 1.95 m (6 ft 5 in)
- Position: Midfielder

Team information
- Current team: Fortuna Sittard
- Number: 5

Youth career
- –2013: PVCV Vleuten
- 2013–2016: Alphense Boys
- 2016–2019: Vitesse

Senior career*
Years	Team	Apps	(Gls)
2019	Jong Vitesse	15	(2)
2019–2021	Vitesse	3	(0)
2021–2025	RKC Waalwijk	116	(14)
2025–2026	Casa Pia	8	(0)
2026–	Fortuna Sittard	13	(2)

International career^{‡}
2022–2023	Morocco U23	5	(0)
- * Club domestic league appearances and goals as of 21 May 2026 ‡ National team caps and goals as of 23:27, 25 November 2023 (UTC)

Yassin Oukili (born 3 January 2001) is a professional footballer who plays as a midfielder for Eredivisie club Fortuna Sittard. Born in the Netherlands, he is a youth international for Morocco.

== Club career ==
=== Vitesse ===
On 5 September 2019, Oukili signed his first professional contract with Vitesse, after having joined the club from Alphense Boys as a youth player. He made his professional debut with Vitesse in a 3–0 Eredivisie win over FC Twente on 14 December 2019.

=== RKC Waalwijk ===
During the winter break in January 2021, Oukili signed a two-and-a-half-year contract with RKC Waalwijk, with an option for an additional season. Upon signing him, director of sports Frank van Mosselveld praised Oukili as a versatile midfielder, and said that he was a part of the club's "mission of signing talented players".

On 21 August 2021, the second matchday of the 2021–22 season, Oukili made his debut for RKC in the 3–2 away loss against SC Heerenveen. He came on as a substitute for Ayman Azhil in the 84th minute.

=== Casa Pia ===
On 30 June 2025, Oukili moved to Portugal, signing a three-year contract with Primeira Liga club Casa Pia.

=== Fortuna Sittard ===
On 2 February 2026, Oukili moved to Eredivisie club Fortuna Sittard.

== International career ==
Born in the Netherlands, Oukili is of Moroccan descent. In November 2023, he was called up to the Morocco U23s.
