= Bilal Başacıkoğlu =

Turkish footballer (born 1995)

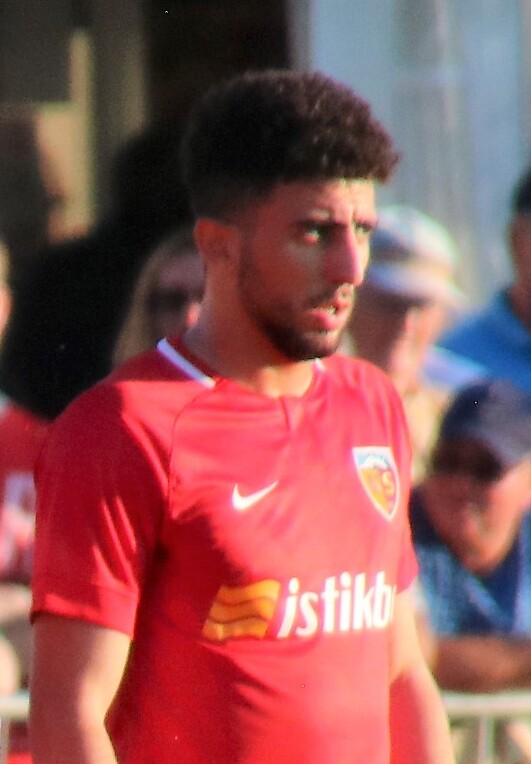
- Başacıkoğlu (2019)

Personal information
- Date of birth: 26 March 1995 (age 31)
- Place of birth: Zaanstad, Netherlands
- Height: 1.79 m (5 ft 10 in)
- Position: Winger

Youth career
- Ajax
- Haarlem
- RKSV Pancratius
- Heerenveen

Senior career*
Years	Team	Apps	(Gls)
2013–2014	Heerenveen	22	(6)
2014–2018	Feyenoord	76	(6)
2018–2020	Kayserispor	33	(0)
2020–2021	Trabzonspor	13	(0)
2021	Gaziantep	12	(0)
2021–2022	Heracles	27	(1)
2022–2023	Tuzlaspor	19	(1)
2023–2025	Sakaryaspor	0	(0)
Total		202	(14)

International career
2012–2013	Netherlands U18	4	(1)
2013–2014	Netherlands U19	10	(0)
2014–2015	Turkey U20	3	(0)
2014–2016	Turkey U21	13	(1)
- * Club domestic league appearances and goals

Bilal Başacıkoğlu (born 26 March 1995) is a former professional footballer who played as a winger. He spent his club career in the Netherlands and Turkey, with his most successful spell coming at Feyenoord, where he was part of the squad that won the Eredivisie title in the 2016–17 season. Born in the Netherlands, he represented Turkey at under-21 international level.

== Club career ==
Başacıkoğlu announced his retirement from professional football on 6 September 2025 via his Instagram account, citing three successive back injuries that had limited his ability to play during his final two seasons with Sakaryaspor.

== International career ==
Başacıkoğlu was born in the Netherlands to a Turkish father and a Moroccan mother. Initially, he represented the Netherlands as a youth. But in 2014, he decided to represent the home country of his father, Turkey, at international level for whom he played in their youth national teams afterwards. In November 2016 Başacıkoğlu received his first call-up to the senior Turkey squad for the match against Kosovo.

== Honours ==
Feyenoord

- Eredivisie: 2016–17
- KNVB Cup: 2015–16, 2017–18
- Johan Cruijff Shield: 2017

Trabzonspor

- Turkish Cup: 2019–20
