= Kevin Felida =

Dutch-Curaçaoan footballer (born 1999)

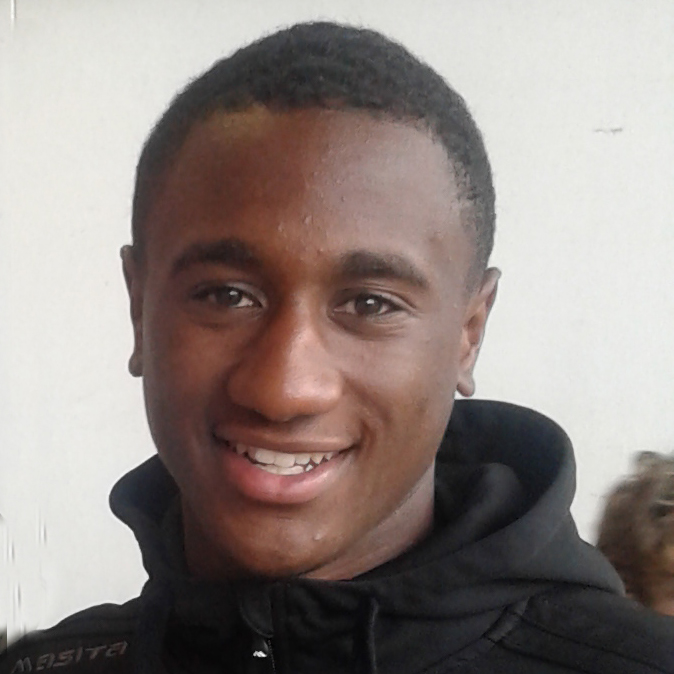
- Felida in 2019

Personal information
- Full name: Kevin Antonio Felida
- Date of birth: 11 November 1999 (age 27)
- Place of birth: Spijkenisse, Netherlands
- Height: 1.74 m (5 ft 9 in)
- Position: Defensive midfielder

Team information
- Current team: Hanoi FC
- Number: 6

Youth career
- SCO '63
- 2009–2012: VV Spijkenisse
- 2012–2016: Excelsior
- 2016–2017: Brabant United
- 2017–2018: Den Bosch

Senior career*
Years	Team	Apps	(Gls)
2018–2022	Den Bosch	132	(6)
2022–2025	RKC	32	(1)
2025–2026	Den Bosch	39	(4)
2026–	Hanoi FC	4	(0)

International career^{‡}
2021–	Curaçao	17	(1)
- * Club domestic league appearances and goals as of 12:34, 11 November 2026 (UTC) ‡ National team caps and goals as of 13:37, 18 June 2025 (UTC)

Kevin Antonio Felida (born 11 November 1999) is a professional footballer who plays as a defensive midfielder for V.League 1 club Hanoi FC. Born in the Netherlands, he plays for the Curaçao national team.

== Club career ==
Born in Spijkenisse, where he grew up as a childhood friend of Joshua Zirkzee, Felida ended up in the youth academy of FC Den Bosch via VV Spijkenisse and Excelsior. In the 2017–18 season, he began playing for their under-21 team. Felida made his senior debut on 1 December 2017, in the 3–0 win over Go Ahead Eagles, where he came on as a substitute in the 85th minute for Muhammed Mert. On 14 November, it was announced that Felida has signed a contract extension keeping him at the club until the summer of 2020. At the same time, he became a regular part of the first-team squad. In the match against FC Dordrecht (4–1 win), on 16 March 2018, Felida scored his first professional goal, a strike from 30 metres out.

In the summer of 2022, Felida joined RKC Waalwijk on a three-year contract.

In July 2025, Felida returned to FC Den Bosch on a free transfer and signed a two-year contract with the club.

On 30 September 2026, Felida was transferred to V.League 1 club Hanoi FC.

== International career ==
Felida debuted with the Curaçao national team in a 0–0 2022 FIFA World Cup qualification tie with Guatemala on 8 June 2021.

On 18 May 2026, he was named by head coach Dick Advocaat in the 26-man squad for the 2026 FIFA World Cup, marking the country's first-ever appearance at the tournament.

== Personal life ==
Born in the Netherlands, Felida is of Curaçaoan descent. He is the nephew of the footballer Charlison Benschop.
