= Ilias Takidine =

Belgian footballer (born 2001)

Personal information
- Date of birth: 5 February 2001 (age 25)
- Place of birth: Genk, Belgium
- Height: 1.71 m (5 ft 7 in)
- Position: Winger

Youth career
- –2020: Genk
- 2020–2022: Anderlecht

Senior career*
Years	Team	Apps	(Gls)
2022–2023	RSCA Futures	17	(0)
2023–2025	RKC Waalwijk	8	(0)
2025–2026	Roda JC	12	(0)

International career
2017	Belgium U16	4	(2)
2018–2019	Belgium U18	2	(0)
- * Club domestic league appearances and goals as of 25 April 2026

Ilias Takidine (born 5 February 2001) is a Belgian professional footballer who plays as a winger.

== Career ==
Takidine was in the youth academy at Genk from the age of eight years-old, but joined Anderlecht in May 2020, signing a four-year contract. He made his debut in the Challenger Pro League on 27 August 2022, for RSCA Futures against SK Beveren.

Takidine joined RKC Waalwijk from RSCA Futures in July 2023. He made limited appearances across two seasons and left the club as a free agent in June 2025, following RKC's relegation from the Eredivisie.

On 11 September 2025, Takidine signed an amateur contract with Eerste Divisie club Roda JC, after a successful trial.

== Style of play ==
Takidine has been described as a right-footed wing player.

== International career ==
Takidine is a Belgian youth international.

== Personal life ==
His brother Jamil Takidine is also a professional footballer.
