= Nouri El Harmazi =

Dutch footballer (born 2002)

Personal information
- Date of birth: 15 May 2002 (age 24)
- Position: Midfielder

Team information
- Current team: MASV

Youth career
- 2010–2014: Ajax
- 2015–2016: Almere City
- 2017–2023: Vitesse

Senior career*
Years	Team	Apps	(Gls)
2020–2021	Vitesse	0	(0)
2023–2025	RKC Waalwijk	0	(0)
2025	Banga Gargždai	8	(1)
2025–2026	De Treffers	3	(1)
2026–	MASV		

International career
2017	Netherlands U15	1	(0)
- * Club domestic league appearances and goals as of 18 April 2026

Nouri El Harmazi (born 15 May 2002) is a Dutch footballer who currently plays for amateur side MASV. He primarily plays as a midfielder.

== Youth career ==
In his youth, El Harmazi grew up in Almere and played for both the Almere City and AFC Ajax academies before joining the SBV Vitesse academy in 2019.

== Club career ==
=== RKC Waalwijk ===
El Harmazi joined RKC Waalwijk from Vitesse in 2023, but was primarily utilized in their youth team. He never made a senior appearance for the club.

=== FK Banga Gargždai ===
In 2025, El Harmazi joined A Lyga club FK Banga Gargždai.

=== De Treffers ===
El Harmazi joined De Treffers in the summer of 2025, parially due to the chance to work with trainers he knew at RKC Waalwijk.

He joined fellow amateurs MASV in summer 2026.

== International career ==
El Harmazi was capped once by the Netherlands national under-15 football team.
