= Chris Lokesa =

Belgian footballer (born 2004)

Personal information
- Full name: Chris-Emmanuel Dikwama Lokesa
- Date of birth: 7 November 2004 (age 22)
- Place of birth: Hasselt, Belgium
- Height: 1.75 m (5 ft 9 in)
- Position: Left winger

Team information
- Current team: Beveren
- Number: 5

Senior career*
Years	Team	Apps	(Gls)
2020–2022	RSCA Futures	11	(4)
2022–2026	RKC Waalwijk	68	(6)
2026–	Beveren	17	(4)

International career^{‡}
2019	Belgium U15	1	(1)
2024–	Belgium U21	5	(0)
- * Club domestic league appearances and goals as of 28 August 2026 ‡ National team caps and goals as of 15:29, 18 November 2026 (UTC)

Chris-Emmanuel Dikwama Lokesa (born 7 November 2004) is a Belgian professional footballer who plays as a left winger for Challenger Pro League club Beveren.

== Early life ==
Chris Lokesa was born on 7 November 2004 in Hasselt, Belgium. He is of Congolese descent.

== Club career ==
=== RSCA Futures ===
Lokesa began his club career in football with the R.S.C. Anderlecht second team.

=== RKC Waalwijk ===
In December 2022, Lokesa moved to RKC Waalwijk on a three-and-a-half year deal. On 23 April 2023, he made his club debut in a 3–0 loss to AZ Alkmaar. He scored his first career club goal against PEC Zwolle on 25 November 2023, securing a 2–1 victory for the club.

=== Beveren ===
On 20 January 2026, Lokesa signed a two-and-half year contract with Beveren.

== Playing style ==
Lokesa is primarily played as either a left winger or as an attacking midfielder.
