= Dario Van den Buijs =

Belgian footballer

Personal information
- Date of birth: 12 September 1995 (age 31)
- Place of birth: Lier, Belgium
- Height: 1.88 m (6 ft 2 in)
- Position: Centre-back

Team information
- Current team: Roda JC Kerkrade
- Number: 33

Youth career
- Club Brugge

Senior career*
Years	Team	Apps	(Gls)
2014–2015	Club Brugge	0	(0)
2015–2017	Eindhoven	67	(10)
2017–2020	Heracles Almelo	37	(1)
2020–2021	Beerschot	23	(0)
2021	→ Fortuna Sittard (loan)	9	(0)
2021–2025	RKC Waalwijk	85	(3)
2025–	Roda JC Kerkrade	19	(0)
- * Club domestic league appearances and goals as of 25 April 2026

Dario Van den Buijs (born 12 September 1995) is a Belgian professional footballer who plays as a centre-back for Dutch Eerste Divisie club Roda JC Kerkrade. He formerly played for Club Brugge, Heracles Almelo, FC Eindhoven, Beerschot, Fortuna Sittard and RKC Waalwijk.

== Club career ==
Van den Buijs spent his youth career at Club Brugge, but failed to make an appearance at the club. He then moved on to play professionally at multiple Dutch clubs. On 30 August 2021, he signed a four-year contract with RKC Waalwijk.

On 8 July 2025, Van den Buijs moved to Roda JC Kerkrade on a one-season deal.

== Personal life ==
His father Stan van den Buijs was a professional footballer with Lierse and KV Mechelen and his grandfather Herman Helleputte played for Lierse and managed Beveren.
