= Frank van Mosselveld =

Dutch footballer

Personal information
- Full name: Frank van Mosselveld
- Date of birth: 2 January 1984 (age 42)
- Place of birth: Waalwijk, Netherlands
- Height: 1.85 m (6 ft 1 in)
- Position: Centre back

Youth career
- WSC
- Willem II

Senior career*
| Years | Team | Apps | (Gls) |
| 2003–2006 | Willem II | 70 | (1) |
| 2006–2015 | RKC Waalwijk | 181 | (8) |
| 2015–2017 | OJC Rosmalen | 23 | (1) |
| Total | | 273 | (10) |
- * Club domestic league appearances and goals

Frank van Mosselveld (born 2 January 1984) is a Dutch former footballer who played as a centre back.

== Career ==
Born in Waalwijk, Netherlands, Van Mosselveld started his career in the youth of amateur side WSC Waalwijk. He made a switch to the combined youth departments of Willem II and RKC Waalwijk. He was picked for the first team of Willem II in the summer of 2003. He made his league debut on 16 August 2003 in a match against AZ, which ended in a 1–0 win for De Tricolores. He played in Tilburg for two more seasons, before joining RKC Waalwijk in the summer of 2006.

Van Mosselveld made his league debut for RKC on 20 August 2006 in the match against Ajax which RKC lost 5–0. In his fifth match for the club from Waalwijk, Van Mosselveld became injured, and was ruled out until after the winter break. Because some injury complications, he did not play anymore matches in the 2006–07 season.

On 28 June 2009, Van Mosselveld signed a new contract with RKC, keeping him in Waalwijk until mid-2011.

== Executive career ==
After his playing career, Van Mosselveld started in a commercial position at RKC Waalwijk. In 2017, he succeeded Remco Oversier, who had left for NEC, as the general manager of RKC.

== Honours ==
=== Club ===
RKC Waalwijk:

- Eerste Divisie: 2010–11
