= Denilho Cleonise =

Dutch footballer (born 2001)

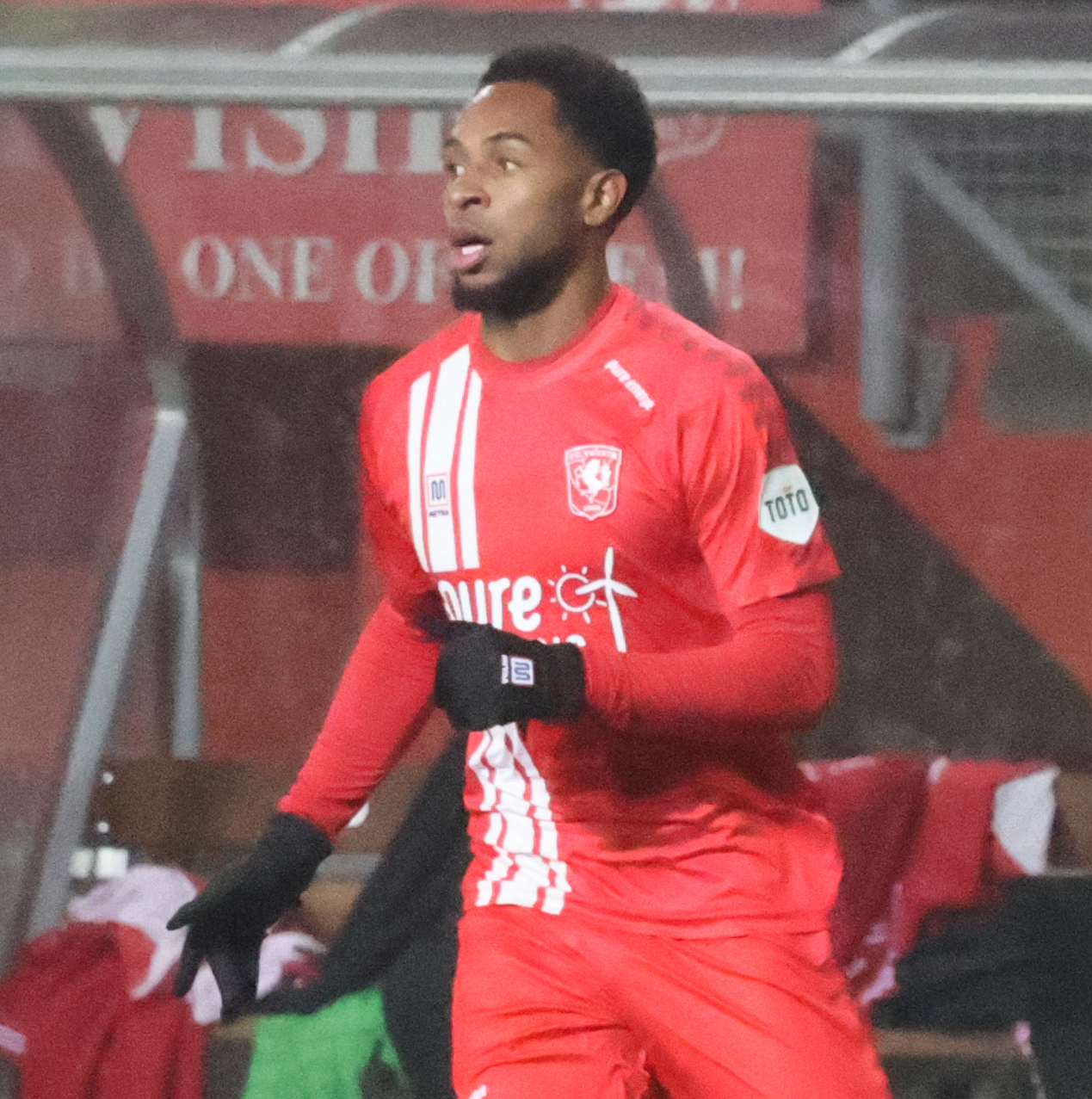

Personal information
- Full name: Denilson Edilson Cleonise Denliho
- Date of birth: 8 December 2001 (age 24)
- Place of birth: Amsterdam, Netherlands
- Height: 1.79 m (5 ft 10 in)
- Position: Winger

Team information
- Current team: ML Vitebsk
- Number: 10

Youth career
- 2010–2013: Ajax
- 2013–2015: Zeeburgia
- 2015–2017: AZ Alkmaar
- 2017–2018: Ajax
- 2018–2019: Genoa

Senior career*
| Years | Team | Apps | (Gls) |
| 2019–2021 | Genoa | 4 | (0) |
| 2021–2023 | FC Twente | 31 | (1) |
| 2023–2026 | RKC Waalwijk | 90 | (9) |
| 2026– | Maxline Vitebsk | 6 | (0) |

International career^{‡}
| 2026– | Suriname | 4 | (0) |
- * Club domestic league appearances and goals as of 17:03, 25 September 2026 (UTC) ‡ National team caps and goals as of 23:03, 9 October 2026 (UTC)

Denilson Edilson Cleonise Denliho (born 8 December 2001) is a Dutch professional footballer who plays as a winger for Belarusian Premier League club ML Vitebsk. Born in the Netherlands, he represents for the Suriname national team.

== Career ==
A youth product of AFC Ajax, in 2013 he left the club to join Zeeburgia. In 2015 he went to AZ Alkmaar, where he played for two years before returning to Ajax. In 2018 he left The Lancers once again to join the youth academy of Genoa in 2018. On 9 November 2019, Cleonise made his professional debut with Genoa in a 0–0 Serie A tie with Napoli.

In August 2021, Cleonise joined FC Twente on a free transfer, with Genoa holing a sell-on clause for the player.

In July 2023, Cleonise signed a two-year contract with RKC Waalwijk.

=== ML Vitebsk ===
On 1 July 2026, Cleonise left RKC Waalwijk to join ML Vitebsk, the reigning champions of the Belarusian Premier League, after a season in which he had scored eight goals and provided eight assists. Dutch media described the transfer as a striking and controversial one, noting that Belarus's support for Russia in the war in Ukraine had made the country an unpopular destination for Dutch players and that Cleonise had had options closer to home; RKC had wanted to keep him, but he told the club that he was ready for a next step.

Cleonise arrived shortly before the club's entry into European competition, where Belarusian clubs are required to play their home matches at neutral venues; ML Vitebsk's first leg against Universitatea Craiova in the first qualifying round of the Champions League was staged in Hungary on 8 July 2026. The club subsequently reached the third qualifying round of the Conference League, in which Cleonise opened the scoring against Borac Banja Luka on 13 August 2026; ML Vitebsk won the return leg 2–1 after extra time to level the tie but were eliminated on penalties.

== Personal life ==
Born in the Netherlands, Cleonise is of Surinamese descent.
