= 2020–21 FC Utrecht season =

FC Utrecht
2020–21 season
- Owner: Frans van Seumeren Holding B.V. (99%); Stichting Beheer Aandelen FC Utrecht (1%)
- Chairman: Pieter Leyssius
- Head coach: John van den Brom (until 6 November 2020); René Hake (from 6 November 2020)
- Stadium: Stadion Galgenwaard
- Eredivisie: 6th
- KNVB Cup: Second round
- Play-offs: Runners-up
- Top goalscorer: League: Sander van de Streek (11); All: Sander van de Streek (15)
- Highest home attendance: 4,944 (RKC Waalwijk, Eredivisie game)
- Lowest home attendance: 3,000 (FC Groningen, Play-offs game)
- Average home league attendance: 3,972
- Biggest win: League: 0–6 (Willem II away); Cup: 2–4 (FC Dordrecht away Play-offs: 1–0 (FC Groningen home)
- Biggest defeat: League: 4–1 (Heracles Almelo away); Cup: 5–4 (AFC Ajax away); Play-offs: 2–0 (Feyenoord away)
Home colours	Away colours	Third colours

The 2020–21 FC Utrecht season was the club's 51st season in existence and the 51st consecutive season in the top flight of Dutch football. In addition to the domestic league, FC Utrecht participated in this season's editions of the KNVB Cup. In the regular season, they qualified for the play-offs, for a place in the second round of the Conference League.

== Players ==
=== First-team squad ===
As of 17 February 2021

Note: Flags indicate national team as defined under FIFA eligibility rules; some limited exceptions apply. Players may hold more than one non-FIFA nationality.

No.	Pos.	Nation	Player
1	GK	NED	Maarten Paes
2	DF	NED	Mark van der Maarel
3	DF	NED	Justin Hoogma (on loan from Hoffenheim)
5	DF	NED	Hidde ter Avest
5	DF	GER	Leon Guwara (Note: Sold or loaned out during the season.)
6	MF	NED	Adam Maher
7	FW	NED	Gyrano Kerk
8	MF	NED	Joris van Overeem
9	FW	ESP	Adrián Dalmau
10	MF	SWE	Simon Gustafson
11	FW	NED	Eljero Elia
13	DF	SWE	Emil Bergström
14	DF	NED	Willem Janssen (captain)
15	FW	AUS	Daniel Arzani (on loan from Manchester City)
16	GK	NED	Thijmen Nijhuis
17	DF	MAR	Benaissa Benamar
17	DF	NED	Sean Klaiber
18	MF	NED	Justin Lonwijk
19	FW	MAR	Mimoun Mahi

No.	Pos.	Nation	Player
20	DF	NED	Giovanni Troupée
21	DF	NED	Django Warmerdam
22	MF	NED	Sander van de Streek
23	MF	NED	Bart Ramselaar
24	MF	NED	Odysseus Velanas
25	MF	NED	Tommy St. Jago
26	FW	BEL	Othmane Boussaid
28	MF	NED	Urby Emanuelson
29	FW	FRA	Moussa Sylla
30	FW	NED	Remco Balk
31	GK	NED	Fabian de Keijzer
32	GK	GER	Eric Oelschlägel
33	DF	NED	Ruben Kluivert
34	DF	NED	Christopher Mamengi
37	FW	NED	Mohamed Mallahi
38	MF	NED	Davy van den Berg
39	FW	NED	Jeredy Hilterman
40	DF	NED	Sylian Mokono
50	GK	NED	Joey Houweling

== Transfers ==
=== Summer ===
==== Transfers in ====
Nat.	Pos	Player	Transferred from	Particularities
(Netherlands) NED	DF	Django Warmerdam	(Netherlands) FC Groningen	Transfer free
(Netherlands) NED	FW	Eljero Elia	(Turkey) İstanbul Başakşehir F.K.	Transfer free
(Morocco) MAR	FW	Mimoun Mahi	(Switzerland) FC Zürich	Transfer free
(France) FRA	FW	Moussa Sylla	(Monaco) AS Monaco FC	Transfer free
(Germany) GER	GK	Eric Oelschlägel	(Germany) Borussia Dortmund	Transfer free
(Netherlands) NED	DF	Justin Hoogma	(Germany) TSG 1899 Hoffenheim	On loan
(Australia) AUS	FW	Daniel Arzani	(England) Manchester City	On loan
(Bosnia and Herzegovina) BIH	DF	Dario Đumić	(Germany) SV Darmstadt 98	Back from loan
(Sweden) SWE	DF	Emil Bergström	(Switzerland) FC Basel	Back from loan
(Netherlands) NED	FW	Nick Venema	(Netherlands) Almere City FC	Back from loan
(Germany) GER	MF	Rico Strieder	(Netherlands) PEC Zwolle	Back from loan
(Belgium) BEL	FW	Othmane Boussaid	(Netherlands) NAC Breda	Back from loan
(Netherlands) NED	FW	Patrick Joosten	(Netherlands) Sparta Rotterdam	Back from loan

==== Transfers out ====
Nat.	Pos	Player	Transferred to	Particularities
(Netherlands) NED	DF	Sean Klaiber	(Netherlands) AFC Ajax	€ 5,000,000
(Netherlands) NED	FW	Patrick Joosten	(Netherlands) FC Groningen	€ 400,000
(Germany) GER	MF	Rico Strieder	(Netherlands) PEC Zwolle	
(Bosnia and Herzegovina) BIH	DF	Dario Đumić	(Netherlands) FC Twente	
(Czech Republic) CZE	FW	Václav Černý	(Netherlands) FC Twente	On loan
(Netherlands) NED	MF	Mitchell van Rooijen	(Netherlands) SBV Excelsior	On loan
(Germany) GER	FW	Jonas Arweiler	(Netherlands) ADO Den Haag	On loan
(Netherlands) NED	FW	Nick Venema	(Netherlands) NAC Breda	On loan
(Ghana) GHA	FW	Abass Issah	(Germany) 1. FSV Mainz 05	Back from loan
(Sweden) SWE	FW	Kristoffer Peterson	(Wales) Swansea City A.F.C.	Back from loan
(Netherlands) NED	GK	Jeroen Zoet	(Netherlands) PSV Eindhoven	Back from loan
(Netherlands) NED	DF	Justin Hoogma	(Germany) TSG 1899 Hoffenheim	Back from loan
(Netherlands) NED	FW	Jean-Christophe Bahebeck	(Serbia) FK Partizan Belgrado	End of contract
(Senegal) SEN	DF	Lamine Sané	Unknown	End of contract

=== Winter ===
==== Transfers in ====
Nat.	Pos	Player	Transferred from	Particularities
(Netherlands) NED	DF	Hidde ter Avest	(Italy) Udinese Calcio	Transfer free
(Morocco) MAR	DF	Benaissa Benamar	(Netherlands) Telstar	
(Netherlands) NED	FW	Remco Balk	(Netherlands) FC Groningen	

==== Transfers out ====
Nat.	Pos	Player	Transferred to	Particularities
(Germany) GER	DF	Leon Guwara	(Netherlands) VVV-Venlo	On loan
(Netherlands) NED	MF	Justin Lonwijk	(Denmark) Viborg FF	On loan (+option to buy)
(Australia) AUS	FW	Daniel Arzani	(England) Manchester City	Terminated the loan early

== Pre-season and friendlies ==
Win Draw Loss

18 July 2020 Friendly	Antwerp (Belgium)	0–0	(Netherlands) Utrecht	Antwerp, Belgium
17:00 CEST (UTC+2)		Report		Stadium: Bosuilstadion; Attendance: 0

22 July 2020 Friendly	Utrecht (Netherlands)	3–3	(Belgium) Genk	Burgh-Haamstede, Netherlands
16:00 CEST (UTC+2)	Kerk 36'; Adewoye 68' (o.g.); Gustafson 88' (pen.)	Report	Dessers 41'; Onuachu 67' (pen.); Oyen 79'	Stadium: Sportpark Van Zuijen; Attendance: 0

1 August 2020 Friendly	Utrecht (Netherlands)	1–0	(Netherlands) AZ Alkmaar	Utrecht, Netherlands
17:30 CEST (UTC+2)	Gustafson 9'	Report		Stadium: Stadion Galgenwaard; Attendance: 0 Referee: Björn Kuipers

8 August 2020 Friendly	Utrecht (Netherlands)	0–1	(Netherlands) Go Ahead Eagles	Utrecht, Netherlands
14.00 CEST (UTC+2)		Report	Beukema 2'	Stadium: Sportcomplex Zoudenbalch; Attendance: 0
Note: Match played in two games from 60-minutes.

8 August 2020 Friendly	Utrecht (Netherlands)	1–0	(Netherlands) Go Ahead Eagles	Utrecht, Netherlands
14.00 CEST (UTC+2)	Dalmau 7'	Report		Stadium: Sportcomplex Zoudenbalch; Attendance: 0
Note: Match played in two games from 60-minutes.

13 August 2020 Friendly	Ajax (Netherlands)	5–1	(Netherlands) Utrecht	Amsterdam, Netherlands
18:45 CEST (UTC+2)	Mazraoui (yellow card); Labyad 4', 38', 45'; Lang 21'; Tagliafico 32'	Report	Klaiber (yellow card); St. Jago (yellow card); Boussaid 70'	Stadium: Johan Cruyff Arena; Attendance: 4,500; Referee: Dennis Higler

15 August 2020 Friendly	Utrecht (Netherlands)	5–1	(Netherlands) Excelsior	Utrecht, Netherlands
15:00 CEST (UTC+2)	Mallahi 50'; Klaiber 54'; Velanas 63'; Dalmau 69', 90'	Report	Matthys (yellow card); Sanches Fernandes 85'	Stadium: Sportcomplex Zoudenbalch; Attendance: 0

20 August 2020 Friendly	Utrecht (Netherlands)	4–1	(Netherlands) SC Heerenveen	Utrecht, Netherlands
21:00 CEST (UTC+2)	Warmerdam 7'; Gustafson 23'; Dalmau 36'; Kerk 84'	Report	Hajal 45'	Stadium: Stadion Galgenwaard; Attendance: 2,805; Referee: Bas Nijhuis

29 August 2020 Friendly	PEC Zwolle (Netherlands)	0–2	(Netherlands) Utrecht	Zwolle, Netherlands
14:00 CEST (UTC+2)	Kersten (yellow card); Huiberts (yellow card)	Report	Ramselaar 17'; Bergström 73'	Stadium: MAC³PARK Stadion; Attendance: 0

14 September 2020 Friendly	Utrecht (Netherlands)	1–2	(Netherlands) Vitesse	Utrecht, Netherlands
14:00 CEST (UTC+2)	De Keijzer (yellow card); Nasser 90'	Report	Manhoef 67'; Broja 78'	Stadium: Sportcomplex Zoudenbalch; Attendance: 0

28 September 2020 Friendly	ADO Den Haag (Netherlands)	1–0	(Netherlands) Utrecht	The Hague, Netherlands
	Ratiu 51'	Report		Stadium: Cars Jeans Stadion; Attendance: 0 Referee: Stijn van Zuilichem

8 October 2020 Friendly	PEC Zwolle (Netherlands)	3–3	(Netherlands) Utrecht	Zwolle, Netherlands
13:00 CEST (UTC+2)	Van Wermeskerken 29'; Doué 54'; Van Duinen 76' (pen.)	Report	Velanas 2'; Van de Streek 12', 40'	Stadium: MAC³PARK Stadion; Attendance: 0 Referee: Maurice Paarhuis

12 November 2020 Friendly	RKC Waalwijk (Netherlands)	4–3	(Netherlands) Utrecht	Waalwijk, Netherlands
	Daneels 56'; Van der Venne 58', 62', 68'		Sylla 2'; Mallahi 43'; Janssen 70'	Stadium: Mandemakers Stadion; Attendance: 0

2 February 2021 Friendly	NAC Breda (Netherlands)	2–2	(Netherlands) Utrecht	Breda, Netherlands
	Venema 11', 59'	Report	Dalmau 2' (pen.); Velanas 16'	Stadium: Sportpark Heksenwiel; Attendance: 0

9 March 2021 Friendly	Utrecht (Netherlands)	1–1	(Netherlands) RKC Waalwijk	Utrecht, Netherlands
	Van den Berg (yellow card); Sanches Fernandes 56'	Report	Augustijns (yellow card); Nieuwpoort (yellow card); Efmorfidis 16'	Stadium: Sportcomplex Zoudenbalch; Attendance: 0 Referee: Thomas Hardeman

24 March 2021 Friendly	Ajax (Netherlands)	2–1	(Netherlands) Utrecht	Duivendrecht, Netherlands
	Fitz-Jim 9'; Idrissi 40'	Report	Mokono 45'	Stadium: Sportpark De Toekomst; Attendance: 0

16 April 2021 Friendly	AZ (Netherlands)	1–0	(Netherlands) Utrecht	Wijdewormer, Netherlands
	Wijndal (yellow card); Boadu 84'	Report		Stadium: AFAS Trainingscomplex; Attendance: 0

== Competitions ==
=== Overview ===
Competition	First match	Last match	Starting round	Final position	Record							
Competition	First match	Last match	Starting round	Final position	Pld	W	D	L	GF	GA	GD	Win %
Eredivisie	18 September 2020	16 May 2021	Matchday 2	6th	34	13	14	7	52	41	+11	38.24
Play-offs Conference League	19 May 2021	23 May 2021	Semifinals	Runners-up	2	1	0	1	1	2	−1	50.00
KNVB Cup	27 October 2020	16 December 2020	First round	Second round	2	1	0	1	8	7	+1	50.00
Total					38	15	14	9	61	50	+11	39.47

Source: Soccerway

=== Eredivisie ===
==== League table ====
Pos	Team	Pld	W	D	L	GF	GA	GD	Pts	Qualification or relegation
4	Vitesse	34	18	7	9	52	38	+14	61	Qualification for the Europa Conference League third qualifying round
5	Feyenoord (O)	34	16	11	7	64	36	+28	59	Qualification for the European competition play-offs (Note: Winner of play-off will qualify to Europa Conference League second qualifying round.)
6	Utrecht	34	13	14	7	52	41	+11	53	Qualification for the European competition play-offs
7	Groningen	34	14	8	12	40	37	+3	50	Qualification for the European competition play-offs
8	Sparta Rotterdam	34	13	8	13	49	48	+1	47	Qualification for the European competition play-offs

Source: Eredivisie, Soccerway
Rules for classification: Season in progress: 1) Most points won; 2) Less points lost; 3) Goal difference; 4) Goals scored; 5) Alphabetical order; End of season: 1) Points; 2) Goal difference; 3) Goals scored; 4) Head-to-head points; 5) Head-to-head goal difference; 6) Head-to-head away goals scored; 7) Play-off if relevant for deciding champion, relegation or participating in a European league, otherwise by draw. 8) Penalty shoot-out (only after a play-off)
(O) Play-off winners

==== Results summary ====
Overall								Home						Away					
Pld	W	D	L	GF	GA	GD	Pts	W	D	L	GF	GA	GD	W	D	L	GF	GA	GD
34	13	14	7	52	41	+11	53	6	7	4	27	25	+2	7	7	3	25	16	+9

Source: Eredivisie

==== Results by round ====
Round	1	2	3	4	5	6	7	8	9	10	11	12	13	14	15	16	17	18	19	20	21	22	23	24	25	26	27	28	29	30	31	32	33	34
Ground	H	A	H	H	A	H	A	H	A	A	H	A	H	A	H	A	H	H	A	H	A	H	A	H	A	H	A	A	H	A	H	A	A	H
Result	D	D	W	D	D	W	L	L	D	D	D	L	D	W	D	L	W	W	W	D	D	W	W	L	W	L	W	W	L	W	W	D	D	D
Position	9	11	7	7	7	7	8	9	9	9	9	10	10	10	10	10	10	8	8	8	9	8	7	8	7	7	7	7	7	6	6	6	6	6

Source: Eredivisie
A = Away; H = Home; W = Win; D = Draw; L = Loss

==== Matches ====
The league fixtures were announced on 24 July 2020.

18 September 2020 2	VVV-Venlo	1–1	Utrecht	Venlo
20:00 CEST (UTC+2)	Hupperts 8'; Post (yellow card) 38'; Van Crooij (yellow card) 77'	Report	Klaiber 58'; Elia (yellow card) 90+4'	Stadium: De Koel; Attendance: 1,435; Referee: Rob Dieperink

27 September 2020 3	Utrecht	3–1	RKC Waalwijk	Utrecht
14:30 CEST (UTC+2)	Mahi 40'; Kerk 74'; Van de Streek 85'	Report	Damașcan 59'	Stadium: Stadion Galgenwaard; Attendance: 4,944; Referee: Siemen Mulder

2 October 2020 4	Utrecht	1–1	sc Heerenveen	Utrecht
20:00 CEST (UTC+2)	Kerk 44'; Van de Streek (yellow card) 48'	Report	H. Veerman 4'; Smit (yellow card) 77', (red card) 83'	Stadium: Stadion Galgenwaard; Attendance: 0 Referee: Pol van Boekel

18 October 2020 5	Groningen	0–0	Utrecht	Groningen
16:45 CEST (UTC+2)	Dammers (yellow card) 11'; Strand Larsen (yellow card) 59'; El Messaoudi (yellow card) 64'; Van Hintum (yellow card) 70'; Matusiwa (yellow card) 85'	Report		Stadium: Hitachi Capital Mobility Stadion; Attendance: 0 Referee: Jeroen Manschot

24 October 2020 6	Utrecht	2–1	Twente	Utrecht
18:45 CEST (UTC+2)	Van der Maarel (yellow card) 27'; Ramselaar 43'; Van de Streek 47'	Report	Danilo 1'; Oosterwolde (yellow card) 18'; Ebuehi (yellow card) 32'; Bosch (yellow card) 55'; Pleguezuelo (yellow card) 57'	Stadium: Stadion Galgenwaard; Attendance: 0 Referee: Kevin Blom

1 November 2020 7	Heracles Almelo	4–1	Utrecht	Almelo
12:15 CET (UTC+1)	Vloet 2', 63', 71'; Szőke (yellow card) 26'; Van der Water 45+1'; Rente (yellow card) 61'	Report	Gustafson 62' (pen.); Ramselaar (yellow card) 65'	Stadium: Erve Asito; Attendance: 0 Referee: Dennis Higler

8 November 2020 8	Utrecht	0–3	Ajax	Utrecht
12:15 CET (UTC+1)		Report	Klaassen 62'; Tadić (yellow card) 65', (goal) 71' (pen.); Promes 90+1'	Stadium: Stadion Galgenwaard; Attendance: 0 Referee: Björn Kuipers

21 November 2020 9	PEC Zwolle	1–1	Utrecht	Zwolle
21:00 CET (UTC+1)	Paal (yellow card) 21'; Warmerdam 32' (o.g.); Huiberts (yellow card) 54'; Lam (yellow card) 84'	Report	St. Jago (yellow card) 17'; Mahi 59'; Gustafson (yellow card) 85'; Elia (yellow card) 87'	Stadium: MAC³PARK Stadion; Attendance: 0 Referee: Danny Makkelie

29 November 2020 10	Feyenoord	1–1	Utrecht	Rotterdam
14:30 CET (UTC+1)	Geertruida 65'; Wehrmann (yellow card) 67'	Report	Van der Maarel 50', (yellow card) 64'	Stadium: De Kuip; Attendance: 0 Referee: Bas Nijhuis

6 December 2020 11	Utrecht	1–1	ADO Den Haag	Utrecht
14:30 CET (UTC+1)	Hoogma 48'; Dalmau (yellow card) 56' (yellow-red card) 66'; Gustafson (yellow card) 71'	Report	Faye (yellow card) 14'; Elmkies (yellow card) 34'; Kramer 85'; Bourard (yellow card) 90'; Besuijen (yellow card) 90+2'	Stadium: Stadion Galgenwaard; Attendance: 0 Referee: Sander van der Eijk

13 December 2020 12	PSV	2–1	Utrecht	Eindhoven
16:45 CET (UTC+1)	Malen 30'; Ihattaren 37'; Dumfries (yellow card) 76'	Report	Hoogma (yellow card) 54'; Mahi 71'	Stadium: Philips Stadion; Attendance: 0 Referee: Serdar Gözübüyük

19 December 2020 13	Utrecht	1–1	Fortuna Sittard	Utrecht
21:00 CET (UTC+1)	Mahi 52'; Kerk (yellow card) 82'	Report	Polter 63', (yellow card) 90+1'; Angha (yellow card) 86'	Stadium: Stadion Galgenwaard; Attendance: 0 Referee: Rob Dieperink

22 December 2020 14	FC Emmen	2–3	Utrecht	Emmen
18:45 CET (UTC+1)	Araujo 27'; Bernadou 43'	Report	Elia 22'; Van Overeem 60'; Dalmau 75'	Stadium: De Oude Meerdijk; Attendance: 0 Referee: Christiaan Bax

27 December 2020 1	Utrecht	2–2	AZ	Utrecht
14:30 CET (UTC+1)	Hoogma (yellow card) 16'; Elia 30'; Van Overeem (yellow card) 45+4'; Gustafson (yellow card) 63'; Dalmau 90+3'	Report	Koopmeiners 64' (pen.); Stengs 83'	Stadium: Stadion Galgenwaard; Attendance: 0 Referee: Pol van Boekel

9 January 2021 15	Utrecht	2–2	Groningen	Utrecht
21:00 CET (UTC+1)	Ramselaar 39'; Kerk (yellow card) 42', (goal) 90+4'; Janssen (yellow card) 69'	Report	Joosten 16'; Larsen 21'; Suslov (yellow card) 55'	Stadium: Stadion Galgenwaard; Attendance: 0 Referee: Jeroen Manschot

12 January 2021 16	Vitesse	1–0	Utrecht	Arnhem
18:45 CET (UTC+1)	Doekhi 26'; Bruns (yellow card) 83'	Report	Van der Maarel (yellow card) 15'	Stadium: GelreDome; Attendance: 0 Referee: Edwin van de Graaf

16 January 2021 17	Utrecht	2–0	Heracles Almelo	Utrecht
20:00 CET (UTC+1)	Van de Streek 31'; Van Overeem (yellow card) 34'; Dalmau 72'; St. Jago (yellow card) 89'	Report	Breukers (yellow card) 40'	Stadium: Stadion Galgenwaard; Attendance: 0 Referee: Ingmar Oostrom

24 January 2021 18	Utrecht	1–0	Sparta Rotterdam	Utrecht
14:30 CET (UTC+1)	Maher (yellow card) 56'; Boussaid 88'	Report	Auassar (yellow card) 76'	Stadium: Stadion Galgenwaard; Attendance: 0 Referee: Serdar Gözübüyük

27 January 2021 19	AZ	0–1	Utrecht	Alkmaar
18:45 CET (UTC+1)	Wijndal (yellow card) 70'	Report	Ramselaar (yellow card) 51'; Van de Streek 69'; Janssen (yellow card) 81'	Stadium: AFAS Stadion; Attendance: 0 Referee: Dennis Higler

30 January 2021 20	Utrecht	3–3	PEC Zwolle	Utrecht
18:45 CET (UTC+1)	Van de Streek 2'; Maher 54' (pen.); Balk (yellow card) 90+3'; Ter Avest 90+6'	Report	Misidjan 4'; Lam 39' (pen.); Buitink 67'; Benson (yellow card) 72'; Van Polen (red card) 90+2'	Stadium: Stadion Galgenwaard; Attendance: 0 Referee: Jannick van der Laan

14 February 2021 22	Utrecht	3–1	VVV-Venlo	Utrecht
14:30 CET (UTC+1)	Maher (penalty missed) 32'; Mahi 61', 90+5'; Ramselaar 85'	Report	Giakoumakis 90+1' (pen.)	Stadium: Stadion Galgenwaard; Attendance: 0 Referee: Bas Nijhuis

19 February 2021 23	Willem II	0–6	Utrecht	Tilburg
20:00 CET (UTC+1)	Selahi (yellow card) 77'	Report	Ter Avest 3'; Van de Streek 11', 19'; Ramselaar 47'; Kerk 69'; Van der Maarel 86'	Stadium: Koning Willem II Stadion; Attendance: 0 Referee: Rob Dieperink

27 February 2021 24	Utrecht	0–1	FC Emmen	Utrecht
16:30 CET (UTC+1)	Boussaid (yellow card) 18'; Maher (yellow card) 36'; Van de Streek (yellow card) 54'; Van der Maarel (yellow card) 83'; Kerk (yellow card) 90+2'	Report	Peña 14'; Frei (yellow card) 64'; De Leeuw (yellow card) 86'; Araujo (yellow card) 89'; Veendorp (yellow card) 90+3'	Stadium: Stadion Galgenwaard; Attendance: 0 Referee: Christiaan Bax

6 March 2021 25	RKC Waalwijk	1–2	Utrecht	Waalwijk
21:00 CET (UTC+1)	Van der Venne 53'; Oosting (yellow card) 59'; Anita (yellow card) 68'	Report	Mahi 12'; Janssen (yellow card) 83'; Van de Streek 90+7' (pen.)	Stadium: Mandemakers Stadion; Attendance: 0 Referee: Sander van der Eijk

14 March 2021 26	Utrecht	1–3	Vitesse	Utrecht
14:30 CET (UTC+1)	Kerk 41'; Maher (yellow card) 48'; Mahi (yellow card) 51'; Oelschlägel (yellow card) 54'; Janssen (yellow card) 79'	Report	Wittek (yellow card) 17', (goal) 57'; Bazoer (yellow card) 23' (yellow-red card) 82'; Darfalou 44', 54' (pen.); Openda (yellow card) 51'; Huisman (yellow card) 88'; Bruns (yellow card) 90+5'	Stadium: Stadion Galgenwaard; Attendance: 0 Referee: Jochem Kamphuis

20 March 2021 27	Fortuna Sittard	0–1	Utrecht	Sittard
16:30 CET (UTC+1)		Report	Dalmau 81'	Stadium: Fortuna Sittard Stadion; Attendance: 0 Referee: Björn Kuipers

4 April 2021 28	ADO Den Haag	1–4	Utrecht	The Hague
14:30 CEST (UTC+2)	Vejinović (yellow card) 66'; Arweiler 72'; De Boer (yellow card) 75'	Report	Kerk 10'; Van Overeem 16'; Boussaid 43'; Maher 74'	Stadium: Cars Jeans Stadion; Attendance: 0 Referee: Dennis Higler

11 April 2021 29	Utrecht	1–2	Feyenoord	Utrecht
12:15 CEST (UTC+2)	Fer 13' (o.g.)	Report	Gustafson 27' (o.g.); Botteghin (yellow card) 35'; Berghuis 57'	Stadium: Stadion Galgenwaard; Attendance: 0 Referee: Danny Makkelie

22 April 2021 21	Ajax	1–1	Utrecht	Amsterdam
18:45 CEST (UTC+2)	Kudus (yellow card) 53'; Álvarez 70'; Tagliafico (yellow card) 87'	Report	Gustafson 13' (pen.)	Stadium: Johan Cruyff Arena; Attendance: 0 Referee: Allard Lindhout

25 April 2021 30	Twente	1–2	Utrecht	Enschede
16:45 CEST (UTC+2)	Danilo 28'; Drommel (yellow card) 59'; Pierie (yellow card) 61'; Oosterwolde (yellow card) 61'	Report	Elia (yellow card) 21'; Van de Streek 49', (penalty missed) 60'; Kerk 55'; Janssen (yellow card) 62'; Van der Maarel (yellow card) 80'	Stadium: De Grolsch Veste; Attendance: 4,000; Referee: Kevin Blom

1 May 2021 31	Utrecht	3–2	Willem II	Utrecht
21:00 CEST (UTC+2)	Van de Streek 4'; Maher (yellow card) 33'; Van Beek 45+4' (o.g.); Kerk 68'; Gustafson (yellow card) 90+2'	Report	Holmén (yellow card) 34', (goal) 57'; Wriedt (yellow card) 37', (goal) 82'	Stadium: Stadion Galgenwaard; Attendance: 0 Referee: Jeroen Manschot

8 May 2021 32	sc Heerenveen	0–0	Utrecht	Heerenveen
18:45 CEST (UTC+2)	Nygren (yellow card) 84'	Report		Stadium: Abe Lenstra Stadion; Attendance: 0 Referee: Pol van Boekel

13 May 2021 33	Sparta Rotterdam	0–0	Utrecht	Rotterdam
14:30 CEST (UTC+2)	Beugelsdijk (yellow card) 50'; Auassar (yellow card) 52'; Abels (yellow card) 90+4'	Report	Maher (yellow card) 52'; Boussaid (yellow card) 76'	Stadium: Het Kasteel; Attendance: 0 Referee: Ingmar Oostrom

16 May 2021 34	Utrecht	1–1	PSV	Utrecht
14:30 CEST (UTC+2)	Van de Streek 36'	Report	Van Ginkel 49'	Stadium: Stadion Galgenwaard; Attendance: 0 Referee: Björn Kuipers

==== Play-offs Conference League ====
19 May 2021 Semifinals	Utrecht	1–0	Groningen	Utrecht
18:45 CEST (UTC+2)	Boussaid (yellow card) 20'; Gustafson 77'; Van de Streek (yellow card) 84'	Report	Itakura (yellow card) 17'; Dankerlui (yellow card) 23'; Lundqvist (yellow card) 62'; El Hankouri (yellow card) 75'	Stadium: Stadion Galgenwaard; Attendance: 3,000; Referee: Danny Makkelie

23 May 2021 Final	Feyenoord	2–0	Utrecht	Rotterdam
12:15 CEST (UTC+2)	Sinisterra 25'; Fer (yellow card) 40'; Senesi (yellow card) 63'; Linssen 89'; Kökçü (yellow card) 90+4'; Spajić (yellow card) 90+6'	Report	Warmerdam (yellow card) 32'; Janssen (yellow card) 90+6'	Stadium: De Kuip; Attendance: 6,500; Referee: Dennis Higler

=== KNVB Cup ===
27 October 2020 First round	FC Dordrecht	2–4	Utrecht	Dordrecht
21:00 CET (UTC+1)	Agrafiotis 16', 57', (yellow card) 81'; Musaba (yellow card) 83'	Report	Ramselaar 5', 40'; Kerk 42'; Van de Streek 79'	Stadium: Riwal Hoogwerkers Stadion; Attendance: 0 Referee: Marc Nagtegaal

16 December 2020 Second round	Ajax	5–4	Utrecht	Amsterdam
21:00 CET (UTC+1)	Tadić 8', 89', (yellow card) 26'; Labyad 45+1', 81'; St. Jago 54' (o.g.); Tagliafico (yellow card) 60'; Schuurs (yellow card) 82'; Gravenberch (yellow card) 90+1'	Report	Mahi 1', 47'; Van Overeem (yellow card) 53'; Van de Streek 55'; Sylla 70'; Boussaid (yellow card) 77'	Stadium: Johan Cruyff Arena; Attendance: 0 Referee: Dennis Higler

== Statistics ==
=== Goalscorers ===
(Netherlands) Eredivisie

No.	Name	Goal
1.	(Netherlands) Sander van de Streek	11
2.	(Netherlands) Gyrano Kerk	8
3.	(Morocco) Mimoun Mahi	7
4.	(Spain) Adrián Dalmau	4
4.	(Netherlands) Bart Ramselaar	4
6.	(Netherlands) Hidde ter Avest	2
6.	(Belgium) Othmane Boussaid	2
6.	(Netherlands) Eljero Elia	2
6.	(Sweden) Simon Gustafson	2
6.	(Netherlands) Mark van der Maarel	2
6.	(Netherlands) Adam Maher	2
6.	(Netherlands) Joris van Overeem	2
13.	(Netherlands) Justin Hoogma	1
13.	(Netherlands) Sean Klaiber (Note: Sold or loaned out during the season.)	1
Own goals opponent		2
Totals		52

(Netherlands) KNVB Cup

No.	Name	Goal
1.	(Morocco) Mimoun Mahi	2
1.	(Netherlands) Bart Ramselaar	2
1.	(Netherlands) Sander van de Streek	2
4.	(Netherlands) Gyrano Kerk	1
4.	(France) Moussa Sylla	1
Own goals opponent		–
Totals		8

(Netherlands) Play-offs Conference League

No.	Name	Goal
1.	(Sweden) Simon Gustafson	1
Own goals opponent		–
Totals		1

=== Assists ===
(Netherlands) Eredivisie

No.	Name	
1.	(Netherlands) Sander van de Streek	5
2.	(Netherlands) Gyrano Kerk	4
2.	(Netherlands) Adam Maher	4
2.	(Netherlands) Bart Ramselaar	4
5.	(Netherlands) Hidde ter Avest	3
5.	(Netherlands) Mark van der Maarel	3
7.	(Belgium) Othmane Boussaid	2
7.	(Morocco) Mimoun Mahi	2
7.	(Netherlands) Django Warmerdam	2
10.	(Australia) Daniel Arzani (Note: Sold or loaned out during the season.)	1
10.	(Morocco) Benaissa Benamar	1
10.	(Sweden) Simon Gustafson	1
10.	(Netherlands) Justin Hoogma	1
10.	(France) Moussa Sylla	1
Totals		34

(Netherlands) KNVB Cup

No.	Name	
1.	(Australia) Daniel Arzani	1
1.	(Netherlands) Eljero Elia	1
1.	(Netherlands) Mark van der Maarel	1
1.	(Netherlands) Gyrano Kerk	1
1.	(Netherlands) Giovanni Troupée	1
1.	(Netherlands) Django Warmerdam	1
Totals		6

== Attendance ==
Round	Opponent	Attendance	Total attendance	Average (Note: Only the matches with an audience are included in this.)
Eredivisie
3	RKC Waalwijk	4,944	4,944	4,944
4	sc Heerenveen	0	4,944	4,944
6	FC Twente	0	4,944	4,944
8	AFC Ajax	0	4,944	4,944
11	ADO Den Haag	0	4,944	4,944
13	Fortuna Sittard	0	4,944	4,944
1	AZ	0	4,944	4,944
15	FC Groningen	0	4,944	4,944
17	Heracles Almelo	0	4,944	4,944
18	Sparta Rotterdam	0	4,944	4,944
20	PEC Zwolle	0	4,944	4,944
22	VVV-Venlo	0	4,944	4,944
24	FC Emmen	0	4,944	4,944
26	Vitesse	0	4,944	4,944
29	Feyenoord	0	4,944	4,944
31	Willem II	0	4,944	4,944
34	PSV	0	4,944	4,944
KNVB Cup
There have been no home games this season.
Play-offs Conference League
Semifinals	FC Groningen	3,000	3,000	3,000
