= 2019–20 FC Utrecht season =

FC Utrecht
2019–20 season
- Chairman: Thijs van Es
- Manager: John van den Brom
- Stadium: Stadion Galgenwaard
- Eredivisie: 6th
- KNVB Cup: Final
- Top goalscorer: League: Gyrano Kerk (10); All: Gyrano Kerk (11)
Home colours	Away colours	Third colours

The 2019–20 FC Utrecht season was the club's 50th season in existence and the 50th consecutive season in the top flight of Dutch football. In addition to the domestic league, FC Utrecht participated in this season's editions of the KNVB Cup. The season covered the period from 2 August 2019 to 10 May 2020. Due to COVID-19, the last day of play was on 8 March 2020.

== Players ==
=== First-team squad ===
Note: Flags indicate national team as defined under FIFA eligibility rules; some limited exceptions apply. Players may hold more than one non-FIFA nationality.

No.	Pos.	Nation	Player
1	GK	NED	Jeroen Zoet (on loan from PSV)
2	DF	NED	Mark van der Maarel
3	DF	NED	Justin Hoogma (on loan from Hoffenheim)
5	DF	GER	Leon Guwara
6	MF	NED	Adam Maher
7	FW	NED	Gyrano Kerk
8	MF	NED	Joris van Overeem
9	FW	FRA	Jean-Christophe Bahebeck
10	MF	SWE	Simon Gustafson
11	FW	ESP	Adrián Dalmau
14	DF	NED	Willem Janssen (captain)
16	GK	NED	Maarten Paes
17	DF	NED	Sean Klaiber

No.	Pos.	Nation	Player
18	MF	NED	Justin Lonwijk
19	FW	SWE	Kristoffer Peterson (on loan from Swansea City)
20	DF	SEN	Lamine Sané
21	FW	GHA	Abass Issah (on loan from Mainz)
22	MF	NED	Sander van de Streek
25	MF	NED	Bart Ramselaar
28	MF	NED	Urby Emanuelson
30	DF	NED	Christopher Mamengi
31	GK	NED	Thijmen Nijhuis
32	FW	CZE	Václav Černý
33	DF	NED	Tommy St. Jago
36	MF	NED	Mitchell van Rooijen
41	GK	NED	Fabian de Keijzer

=== On loan ===
Note: Flags indicate national team as defined under FIFA eligibility rules; some limited exceptions apply. Players may hold more than one non-FIFA nationality.

No.	Pos.	Nation	Player
13	DF	SWE	Emil Bergström (at FC Basel until 30 June 2020)
15	MF	GER	Rico Strieder (at PEC Zwolle until 30 June 2020)
19	FW	NED	Patrick Joosten ( at Sparta Rotterdam until 30 June 2020)
20	DF	NED	Giovanni Troupée ( at FC Twente until 30 June 2020)

No.	Pos.	Nation	Player
26	FW	BEL	Othman Boussaid ( at NAC Breda until 30 June 2020)
29	FW	NED	Nick Venema ( at Almere City FC until 30 June 2020)
—	DF	BIH	Dario Đumić ( at SV Darmstadt 98 until 30 June 2020)

== Pre-season and friendlies ==
Win Draw Loss

14 July 2019 Friendly	SV Meppen (Germany)	0–0 (4–5 p)	(Netherlands) Utrecht	Meppen, Germany
15:00 CEST (UTC+2)				Stadium: Hänsch-Arena

10 January 2020 Friendly	Utrecht (Netherlands)	4–3	(Germany) Bayer Leverkusen	La Manga, Spain
14:00 CET (UTC+1)	Dalmau 17'; Klaiber 35'; Kerk 51'; Maddy 86'		Havertz 54', 90'; Volland 80'	Stadium: La Manga Club Football Stadium; Attendance: 300

== Competitions ==
=== Overview ===
Competition	First match	Last match	Starting round	Final position	Record							
Competition	First match	Last match	Starting round	Final position	Pld	W	D	L	GF	GA	GD	Win %
Eredivisie	4 August 2019	8 March 2020	Matchday 1	6th	25	12	5	8	50	34	+16	48.00
TOTO KNVB Cup	31 October 2019	4 March 2020	First round	Final	5	5	0	0	13	3	+10	100.00
Total					30	17	5	8	63	37	+26	56.67

Source: Soccerway

=== Eredivisie ===
==== League table ====
Pos	Team	Pld	W	D	L	GF	GA	GD	Pts	Qualification or relegation
4	PSV Eindhoven	26	14	7	5	54	28	+26	49	Qualification for the Europa League third qualifying round
5	Willem II	26	13	5	8	37	34	+3	44	Qualification for the Europa League second qualifying round
6	FC Utrecht	25	12	5	8	50	34	+16	41	
7	Vitesse	26	12	5	9	45	35	+10	41	
8	Heracles Almelo	26	10	6	10	40	34	+6	36	

Source: eredivisie.nl
Rules for classification: Season in progress: 1) Most points won; 2) Less points lost; 3) Goal difference; 4) Goals scored; 5) Alphabetical order; End of season: 1) Points; 2) Goal difference; 3) Goals scored; 4) Head-to-head points; 5) Head-to-head goal difference; 6) Head-to-head away goals scored; 7) Play-off if relevant for deciding champion, relegation or participating in a European league, otherwise by draw. 8) Penalty shoot-out (only after a play-off)

==== Results summary ====
Overall								Home						Away					
Pld	W	D	L	GF	GA	GD	Pts	W	D	L	GF	GA	GD	W	D	L	GF	GA	GD
25	12	5	8	50	34	+16	41	8	0	4	30	12	+18	4	5	4	20	22	−2

Source: Eredivisie

==== Results by round ====
Round	1	2	3	4	5	6	7	8	9	10	11	12	13	14	15	16	17	18	19	20	21	22	23	24	25	26	27	28	29	30	31	32	33	34
Ground	A	H	A	H	A	H	A	H	A	H	A	H	A	H	H	A	A	H	A	H	A	H	A	H	A	H	H	A	H	A	H	A	H	A
Result	W	W	D	L	L	W	D	W	L	W	W	W	L	L	L	W	W	L	D	W	D	C	D	W	L	W	C	C	C	C	C	C	C	C
Position	3	2	4	7	8	6	7	5	6	5	5	4	4	4	8	6	5	7	7	7	7	6	6	6	6	6	6	6	6	6	6	6	6	6

Source: Eredivisie
A = Away; H = Home; W = Win; D = Draw; L = Loss

==== Matches ====
The Eredivisie schedule was announced on 14 June 2019. The 2019–20 season was abandoned on 24 April 2020, due to the coronavirus pandemic in the Netherlands.

4 August 2019 1	ADO Den Haag	2–4	Utrecht	The Hague
16:45 CEST (UTC+2)	Necid (yellow card) 8'; Meijers 21'; Falkenburg 25'; Bakker (yellow card) 55'	Report	Černý (yellow card) 30'; Zwinkels 36' (o.g.); Kerk 44'; Immers 52' (o.g.); Venema 63'	Stadium: Cars Jeans Stadion; Attendance: 10,633; Referee: Kevin Blom

11 August 2019 2	Utrecht	3–1	PEC Zwolle	Utrecht
16:45 CEST (UTC+2)	Klaiber (yellow card) 15'; Van de Streek 47'; Gustafsson (yellow card) 44', (goal) 49'; Janssen 73'	Report	Huiberts (yellow card) 10'; Hamer 16'	Stadium: Stadion Galgenwaard; Attendance: 18,736; Referee: Siemen Mulder

18 August 2019 3	Feyenoord	1–1	Utrecht	Rotterdam
16:45 CEST (UTC+2)	Haps 51'	Report	Issah 9'	Stadium: De Kuip; Attendance: 39,452; Referee: Pol van Boekel

25 August 2019 4	Utrecht	1–2	VVV-Venlo	Utrecht
14:30 CEST (UTC+2)	Dalmau 76'	Report	Sinclair (yellow card) 18'; Janssen (yellow card) 29'; Linthorst 37', 44'; Cattermole (yellow card) 84'	Stadium: Stadion Galgenwaard; Attendance: 17,986; Referee: Jochem Kamphuis

1 September 2019 5	FC Twente	3–1	Utrecht	Enschede
12:15 CEST (UTC+2)	Cantalapiedra 22', 90+3'; Vučkić (yellow card) 39', (goal) 68'	Report	Maher (yellow card) 35'; Dalmau 59'; Guwara (red card) 90+3'	Stadium: De Grolsch Veste; Attendance: 25,500; Referee: Jeroen Manschot

14 September 2019 6	Utrecht	3–1	FC Emmen	Utrecht
20:45 CEST (UTC+2)	Dalmau 38'; Kerk 54'; Maher (yellow card) 65'; Janssen (yellow card) 65'; Issah (yellow card) 90+5'; Bahebeck 90+6'	Report	Chacón (yellow card) 34'; Beste (yellow card) 43'; Laursen (yellow card) 51'; de Leeuw 58'; Peña (yellow card) 86'	Stadium: Stadion Galgenwaard; Attendance: 17,661; Referee: Björn Kuipers

22 September 2019 7	SC Heerenveen	1–1	Utrecht	Heerenveen
12:15 CEST (UTC+2)		Report		Stadium: Abe Lenstra Stadion

29 September 2019 8	Utrecht	2–0	Willem II	Utrecht
14:30 CEST (UTC+2)		Report		Stadium: Stadion Galgenwaard; Attendance: 19,419; Referee: Edwin van de Graaf

5 October 2019 9	Vitesse	2–1	Utrecht	Arnhem
19:45 CEST (UTC+2)		Report		Stadium: GelreDome

19 October 2019 10	Utrecht	3–0	PSV	Utrecht
20:45 CEST (UTC+2)	Van de Streek 49'; Maher 82'; Klaiber 90+3'	Report	Viergever (red card) 68'; Dumfries (yellow card) 70'; Hendrix (red card) 74'	Stadium: Stadion Galgenwaard; Attendance: 22,632; Referee: Danny Makkelie

27 October 2019 11	Sparta Rotterdam	1–2	Utrecht	Rotterdam
14:30 CET (UTC+1)		Report		Stadium: Het Kasteel

3 November 2019 12	Utrecht	6–0	Fortuna Sittard	Utrecht
14:30 CET (UTC+1)		Report		Stadium: Stadion Galgenwaard; Attendance: 18,776; Referee: Jochem Kamphuis

10 November 2019 13	AFC Ajax	4–0	Utrecht	Amsterdam
12:15 CET (UTC+1)	Van de Beek 14', 40'; Tadić 24'; Martínez 66'	Report		Stadium: Johan Cruyff Arena; Attendance: 53,381; Referee: Bas Nijhuis

23 November 2019 14	Utrecht	0–3	AZ	Utrecht
18:30 CET (UTC+1)		Report	Koopmeiners 24'; Idrissi 31'; Boadu 50'	Stadium: Stadion Galgenwaard; Attendance: 22,401; Referee: Björn Kuipers

1 December 2019 15	Utrecht	0–1	RKC Waalwijk	Utrecht
14:30 CET (UTC+1)		Report		Stadium: Stadion Galgenwaard

8 December 2019 16	FC Groningen	0–1	Utrecht	Groningen
14:30 CET (UTC+1)		Report		Stadium: Noordlease Stadion

15 December 2019 17	Heracles Almelo	1–3	Utrecht	Almelo
16:45 CET (UTC+1)		Report		Stadium: Polman Stadion

22 December 2019 18	Utrecht	1–2	Feyenoord	Utrecht
14:30 CET (UTC+1)	Hoogma 17'	Report	Kökçü 15'; Toornstra 50'	Stadium: Stadion Galgenwaard; Attendance: 21,103; Referee: Björn Kuipers

17 January 2020 19	PEC Zwolle	3–3	Utrecht	Zwolle
20:00 CET (UTC+1)		Report		Stadium: MAC³PARK Stadion

24 January 2020 20	Utrecht	4–0	ADO Den Haag	Utrecht
20:00 CET (UTC+1)		Report		Stadium: Stadion Galgenwaard

2 February 2020 21	VVV-Venlo	1–1	Utrecht	Venlo
14:30 CET (UTC+1)		Report		Stadium: De Koel

16 February 2020 23	Willem II	1–1	Utrecht	Tilburg
16:45 CET (UTC+1)	Nieuwkoop (yellow card) 78'; Gladon 90+1'	Report	Bahebeck 4'; Gustafson (yellow card) 90+2'	Stadium: Koning Willem II Stadion; Attendance: 14,107; Referee: Siemen Mulder

23 February 2020 24	Utrecht	2–1	FC Twente	Utrecht
12:15 CET (UTC+1)	Klaiber (yellow card) 23'; Van der Maarel (yellow card) 79'; Kerk 83'; Arweiler 86'	Report	Selahi (yellow card) 31'; Vučkić 70'; Verdonk (yellow card) 90+2'	Stadium: Stadion Galgenwaard; Attendance: 18,491; Referee: Jeroen Manschot

1 March 2020 25	RKC Waalwijk	2–1	Utrecht	Waalwijk
12:15 CET (UTC+1)		Report		Stadium: Mandemakers Stadion

8 March 2020 26	Utrecht	5–1	Sparta Rotterdam	Utrecht
12:15 CET (UTC+1)		Report		Stadium: Stadion Galgenwaard

14 March 2020 27	Utrecht	Cancelled	Vitesse	Utrecht
20:45 CET (UTC+1)				Stadium: Stadion Galgenwaard
Note: Match was initially scheduled for 14 March, but cancelled due to the COVID-19 pandemic in the Netherlands.

22 March 2020 28	FC Emmen	Cancelled	Utrecht	Emmen
14:30 CET (UTC+1)				Stadium: De Oude Meerdijk
Note: Match was initially scheduled for 22 March, but cancelled due to the COVID-19 pandemic in the Netherlands.

4 April 2020 29	Utrecht	Cancelled	FC Groningen	Utrecht
19:15 CEST (UTC+2)				Stadium: Stadion Galgenwaard
Note: Match was initially scheduled for 4 April, but cancelled due to the COVID-19 pandemic in the Netherlands.

9 April 2020 22	Utrecht	Cancelled	AFC Ajax	Utrecht
19:15 CEST (UTC+2)				Stadium: Stadion Galgenwaard
Note: Match was initially scheduled for 9 April, but cancelled due to the COVID-19 pandemic in the Netherlands.

12 April 2020 30	Fortuna Sittard	Cancelled	Utrecht	Sittard
14:30 CEST (UTC+2)				Stadium: Fortuna Sittard Stadion
Note: Match was initially scheduled for 12 April, but cancelled due to the COVID-19 pandemic in the Netherlands.

22 April 2020 31	Utrecht	Cancelled	Heracles Almelo	Utrecht
16:30 CEST (UTC+2)				Stadium: Stadion Galgenwaard
Note: Match was initially scheduled for 22 April, but cancelled due to the COVID-19 pandemic in the Netherlands.

25 April 2020 32	PSV	Cancelled	Utrecht	Eindhoven
18:30 CEST (UTC+2)				Stadium: Philips Stadion
Note: Match was initially scheduled for 25 April, but cancelled due to the COVID-19 pandemic in the Netherlands.

3 May 2020 33	AZ	Cancelled	Utrecht	Alkmaar
14:30 CEST (UTC+2)				Stadium: AFAS Stadion
Note: Match was initially scheduled for 3 May, but cancelled due to the COVID-19 pandemic in the Netherlands.

10 May 2020 34	Utrecht	Cancelled	SC Heerenveen	Utrecht
18:30 CEST (UTC+2)				Stadium: Stadion Galgenwaard
Note: Match was initially scheduled for 10 May, but cancelled due to the COVID-19 pandemic in the Netherlands.

=== TOTO KNVB Cup ===
31 October 2019 First round	Excelsior '31	1–4	Utrecht	Rijssen
18:30 CET (UTC+1)	Penterman 77'	Report	Guwara 9'; Maher 41' (pen.); Issah 72'; Makienok 90'	Stadium: Sportpark De Koerbelt; Attendance: 2,514; Referee: Richard Martens

19 December 2019 Second round	FC Groningen	0–1	Utrecht	Groningen
18:30 CET (UTC+1)		Report	Issah 68'	Stadium: Euroborg; Attendance: 14,548; Referee: Pol van Boekel

21 January 2020 Round of 16	FC Eindhoven	1–2 (a.e.t.)	Utrecht	Eindhoven
20:45 CET (UTC+1)	Bourard 37'	Report	Issah 61'; Bahebeck 112'	Stadium: Jan Louwers Stadion; Attendance: 1,678; Referee: Stan Teuben

13 February 2020 Quarter-finals	Go Ahead Eagles	1–4	Utrecht	Deventer
18:30 CET (UTC+1)	Navrátil 49'	Report	Gustafson 37'; Maher 45+2'; Bahebeck 55'; Peterson 74'	Stadium: De Adelaarshorst; Attendance: 8,064; Referee: Danny Makkelie

4 March 2020 Semi-finals	Utrecht	2–0	AFC Ajax	Utrecht
20:45 CET (UTC+1)	Van de Streek 33'; Gustafson 65' (pen.); Klaiber (yellow card) 87'	Report	Huntelaar (yellow card) 72'; Martínez (yellow card) 89'	Stadium: Stadion Galgenwaard; Attendance: 22,601; Referee: Björn Kuipers

19 April 2020 Final	Utrecht	Cancelled	Feyenoord	Rotterdam
18:00 CEST (UTC+2)		Report		Stadium: De Kuip
Note: Match was initially scheduled for 19 April, but cancelled due to the COVID-19 pandemic in the Netherlands.
