= Giovanni Troupée =

Curaçao footballer (born 1998)

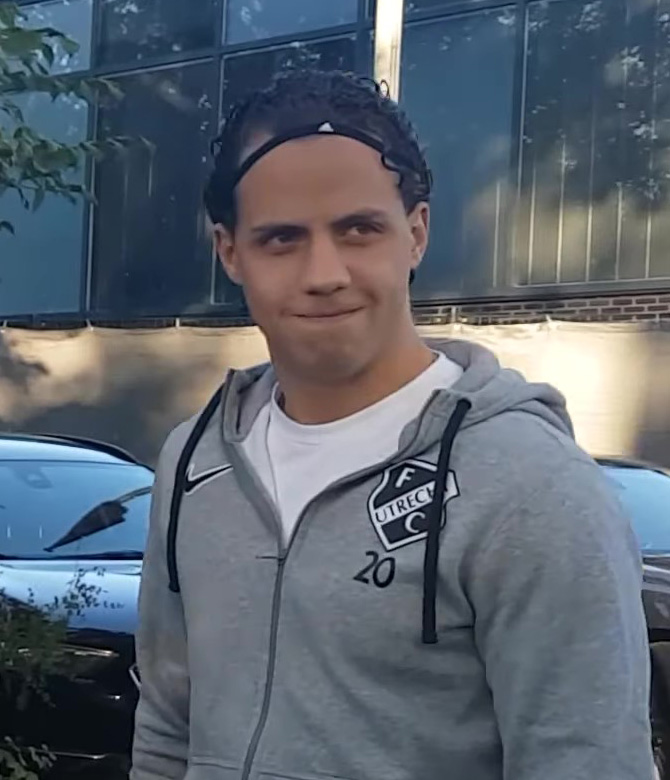
- Troupée with Utrecht in 2019

Personal information
- Full name: Giovanni Dennis Vito Troupée
- Date of birth: 20 March 1998 (age 28)
- Place of birth: Breukelen, Netherlands
- Height: 1.81 m (5 ft 11 in)
- Position: Right-back

Team information
- Current team: Željezničar
- Number: 20

Youth career
- Abcoude
- –2009: Nijenrodes
- 2009–2015: Utrecht

Senior career*
Years	Team	Apps	(Gls)
2015–2021	Utrecht	61	(3)
2017–2021	Jong Utrecht	17	(1)
2018–2019	→ ADO Den Haag (loan)	21	(1)
2019–2020	→ Twente (loan)	8	(0)
2021–2022	Twente	21	(0)
2022–2023	Lokomotiv Plovdiv	9	(0)
2023–2025	TOP Oss	50	(2)
2025–	Željezničar	14	(0)

International career
2015	Netherlands U17	8	(0)
2015–2016	Netherlands U18	8	(0)
2017	Netherlands U19	1	(0)
2023	Curaçao	3	(0)
- * Club domestic league appearances and goals as of 7 November 2026

Giovanni Dennis Vito Troupée (born 20 March 1998) is a professional footballer who plays as a right-back for Bosnian Premier League club Željezničar. Born in the Netherlands, he played for the Curaçao national team.

== Club career ==
=== Utrecht ===
Troupée is a youth exponent from Utrecht. He made his Eredivisie debut on 17 May 2015 as a 62nd-minute substitute for Jelle de Lange against Vitesse. He became a starter in the 2016–17 season under head coach Erik ten Hag, as Utrecht finished the season fourth in the league and later qualifying for the UEFA Europa League after winning the play-offs. Troupée finished the season by winning the "David Di Tommaso Trophy" for best player of the year at Utrecht.

On 28 August 2018, he joined ADO Den Haag on a season-long loan, after losing his place in the starting lineup of Utrecht. He returned to Utrecht for the 2019–20 season, but was mainly a backup to Sean Klaiber in the right-back position, which meant that he was sent on a six-month loan to Twente in January 2020. In a spring season, which was suspended due to the effects of COVID-19 pandemic, Troupée made 8 appearances for Twente.

Troupée started the 2020–21 season as a backup to Mark van der Maarel in the right-back position for Utrecht.

=== Twente ===
As his contract with Utrecht expired in June 2021, Troupée left the club on a free transfer and signed a one-year contract with Twente. He left the club after one season as his contract expired.

=== Lokomotiv Plovdiv ===
On 20 December 2022, he signed with Bulgarian club Lokomotiv Plovdiv one a one-and-a-half-year deal. He made his debut for the club on 12 February 2023, starting in a 0–0 home draw against Botev Vratsa.

=== TOP Oss ===
On 12 October 2023, Troupée signed a one-year deal with Eerste Divisie club TOP Oss. He made his debut for the club on 20 October, starting in a 3–0 away loss to Jong AZ.

=== Željezničar ===
On 20 June 2025, Troupée signed a two-year contract with Bosnian Premier League side Željezničar. He made his debut against Koper in a 2025–26 UEFA Conference League first qualifying round first leg on 10 July 2025.

== International career ==
Troupée is Netherlands-born to a Dutch father and Curaçaoan mother, and a former youth international for the Netherlands.

In March 2023, he received his first call-up to the Curaçao senior national team for the Nations League match against Canada and a friendly against Argentina. On 28 March 2023, Troupée earned his first cap in a 7–0 loss against the latter, coming on as a substitute during the second half.

== Career statistics ==
=== Club ===
As of match played 7 November 2026

Appearances and goals by club, season and competition
Club	Season	League			National cup		Europe		Other		Total	
Club	Season	Division	Apps	Goals	Apps	Goals	Apps	Goals	Apps	Goals	Apps	Goals
Utrecht	2014–15	Eredivisie	1	0	0	0	—		—		1	0
Utrecht	2015–16	Eredivisie	3	0	0	0	—		4 (Note: Appearances in Eredivisie European competition play-offs)	1	7	1
Utrecht	2016–17	Eredivisie	29	3	4	1	—		2	0	35	4
Utrecht	2017–18	Eredivisie	13	0	1	0	3 (Note: Appearances in UEFA Europa League)	0	4	0	21	0
Utrecht	2018–19	Eredivisie	1	0	—		—		—		1	0
Utrecht	2019–20	Eredivisie	8	0	1	0	1	0	—		10	0
Utrecht	2020–21	Eredivisie	6	0	1	0	—		—		7	0
Utrecht	Total		61	3	7	1	4	0	10	1	82	5
Jong Utrecht	2017–18	Eerste Divisie	8	1	—		—		—		8	1
Jong Utrecht	2019–20	Eerste Divisie	4	0	—		—		—		4	0
Jong Utrecht	2020–21	Eerste Divisie	5	0	—		—		—		5	0
Jong Utrecht	Total		17	1	—		—		—		17	1
ADO Den Haag (loan)	2018–19	Eredivisie	21	1	2	0	—		—		23	1
Twente (loan)	2019–20	Eredivisie	8	0	0	0	—		—		8	0
Twente	2021–22	Eredivisie	21	0	3	1	—		—		24	1
Lokomotiv Plovdiv	2022–23	Bulgarian First League	9	0	0	0	—		—		9	0
TOP Oss	2023–24	Eerste Divisie	19	0	1	0	—		—		20	0
TOP Oss	2024–25	Eerste Divisie	31	2	0	0	—		—		31	2
TOP Oss	Total		50	2	1	0	—		—		51	2
Željezničar	2025–26	Bosnian Premier League	11	0	1	0	2	0	—		14	0
Željezničar	2026–27	Bosnian Premier League	3	0	0	0	—		—		3	0
Željezničar	Total		14	0	1	0	2	0	—		17	0
Career total			201	7	14	2	6	0	10	1	231	10

== Honours ==
Jong Utrecht

- Beloften Eredivisie: 2015–16

Individual

- Utrecht Player of the Year: 2016–17
