= Joris van Overeem =

Dutch footballer (born 1994)

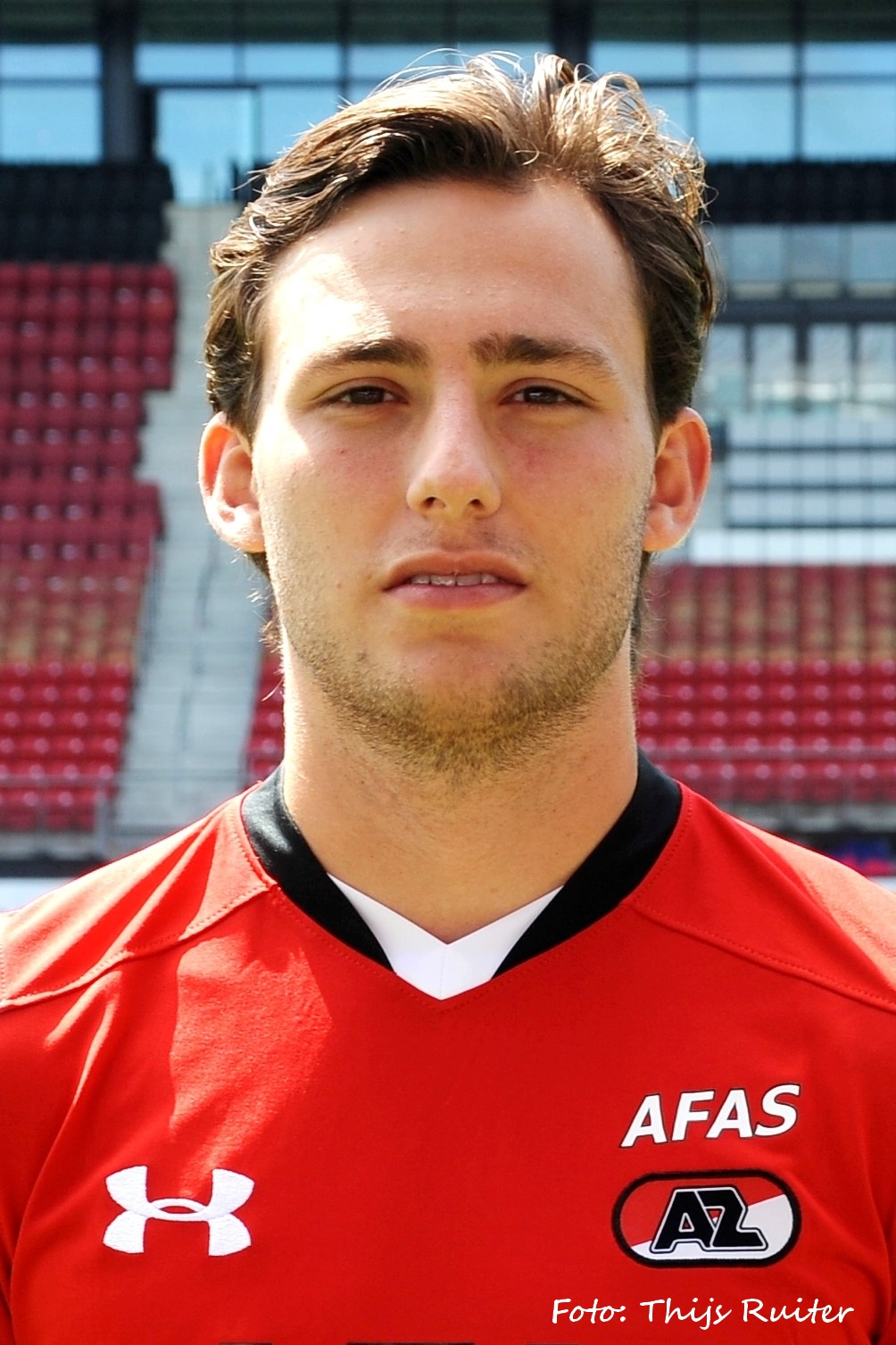
- van Overeem with AZ in 2015

Personal information
- Date of birth: 1 June 1994 (age 32)
- Place of birth: Amsterdam, Netherlands
- Height: 1.81 m (5 ft 11 in)
- Position: Midfielder

Team information
- Current team: Utrecht
- Number: 8

Youth career
- 1999–2006: Abcoude
- 2006–2013: AZ

Senior career*
Years	Team	Apps	(Gls)
2013–2018	AZ	85	(10)
2014–2015	→ Dordrecht (loan)	34	(2)
2016–2017	Jong AZ	3	(0)
2018–2022	Utrecht	103	(5)
2022–2025	Maccabi Tel Aviv	71	(2)
2025–2026	Heerenveen	33	(2)
2026–	Utrecht	5	(0)

International career^{‡}
2009–2010	Netherlands U16	6	(0)
2010–2011	Netherlands U17	8	(0)
2011–2012	Netherlands U18	2	(0)
2013	Netherlands U19	2	(0)
2013–2014	Netherlands U20	3	(0)
2014–2017	Netherlands U21	11	(0)
Medal record
Men's football
Representing Netherlands
UEFA European Under-17 Championship
Winner	2011 Serbia
- * Club domestic league appearances and goals as of 18 October 2026 ‡ National team caps and goals as of 30 December 2017

Joris van Overeem (born 1 June 1994) is a Dutch professional footballer who plays as a midfielder for Eredivisie club Utrecht.

== Club career ==
=== AZ ===
Van Overeem joined AZ's youth academy from Abcoude in 2006. His made his senior debut for AZ on 30 October 2013, during a KNVB Cup fixture against Achilles '29. He entered the match as a substitute for Jeffrey Gouweleeuw in the 69th minute and sealed his debut with a goal in the 88th minute, contributing to a resounding 7–0 home victory. On 12 December 2013, he marked his European debut for AZ in the UEFA Europa League away clash against Greek team PAOK, which ended in a 2–2 draw. He entered the game in the 89th minute, replacing Ridgeciano Haps.

In July 2014, Van Overeem joined recently promoted Eredivisie club Dordrecht on a one-season loan deal. On 9 August 2014, he made his debut in the Eredivisie against Heerenveen; in a match that ended in a 2–1 away victory, where he both opened and scored his debut senior league goal. Van Overeem served as a regular starter for Dordrecht during that season. Unfortunately, both he and the club experienced relegation at the season's conclusion, and he returned to AZ.

=== Utrecht ===
In May 2018, Van Overeem joined Eredivisie club Utrecht on a four-year contract. He was mainly a starter during the following four seasons, scoring six goals in 116 appearances for the club.

=== Maccabi Tel Aviv ===
On 13 June 2022, Van Overeem signed a three-year contract with Israeli Premier League club Maccabi Tel Aviv.

=== Heerenveen ===
On 26 June 2025, Van Overeem returned to the Netherlands and signed with Heerenveen for two seasons.

=== Return to Utrecht ===
On 20 July 2026, Van Overeem returned to Utrecht with a two-season deal.

== Style of play ==
Van Overeem has been characterised as a "modern midfielder" due to his versatility in various positions. His dynamic and attacking style enables him to create scoring opportunities for his teammates effectively. As a youth player, he idolised Cesc Fàbregas.

== Career statistics ==
As of match played 18 October 2026

Appearances and goals by club, season and competition
Club	Season	League			National cup		League Cup		Europe		Other		Total	
Club	Season	Division	Apps	Goals	Apps	Goals	Apps	Goals	Apps	Goals	Apps	Goals	Apps	Goals
AZ	2013–14	Eredivisie	0	0	1	1	—		1 (Note: Appearances in UEFA Europa League)	0	—		2	1
AZ	2015–16	Eredivisie	33	4	3	1	—		9	2	—		45	7
AZ	2016–17	Eredivisie	27	4	3	0	—		8	0	—		38	4
AZ	2017–18	Eredivisie	25	2	4	0	—		—		—		29	2
AZ	Total		85	10	11	2	—		18	2	—		114	14
Dordrecht (loan)	2014–15	Eredivisie	34	2	1	0	—		—		—		35	2
Jong AZ	2016–17	Tweede Divisie	3	0	—		—		—		—		3	0
Utrecht	2018–19	Eredivisie	32	2	3	1	—		—		—		35	3
Utrecht	2019–20	Eredivisie	14	0	5	0	—		1	0	—		20	0
Utrecht	2020–21	Eredivisie	32	2	2	0	—		—		—		34	2
Utrecht	2021–22	Eredivisie	25	1	2	0	—		—		—		27	1
Utrecht	Total		103	5	12	1	—		1	0	—		116	6
Maccabi Tel Aviv	2022–23	Israeli Premier League	9	0	1	0	2	0	6 (Note: Appearances in UEFA Conference League)	0	—		18	0
Maccabi Tel Aviv	2023–24	Israeli Premier League	31	0	0	0	2	0	14	0	—		47	0
Maccabi Tel Aviv	2024–25	Israeli Premier League	31	2	0	0	1	0	12 (Note: Two appearances in UEFA Champions League, ten appearances in UEFA Europa League)	0	1 (Note: Appearance in Israel Super Cup)	0	45	2
Maccabi Tel Aviv	Total		71	2	1	0	5	0	32	0	1	0	110	2
Heerenveen	2025–26	Eredivisie	33	2	4	0	—		—		1 (Note: Appearance in Eredivisie play-offs)	0	38	2
Utrecht	2026–27	Eredivisie	5	0	0	0	—		—		—		5	0
Career total			334	21	29	3	5	0	51	2	2	0	421	26
