= Hidde ter Avest =

Dutch footballer (born 1997)

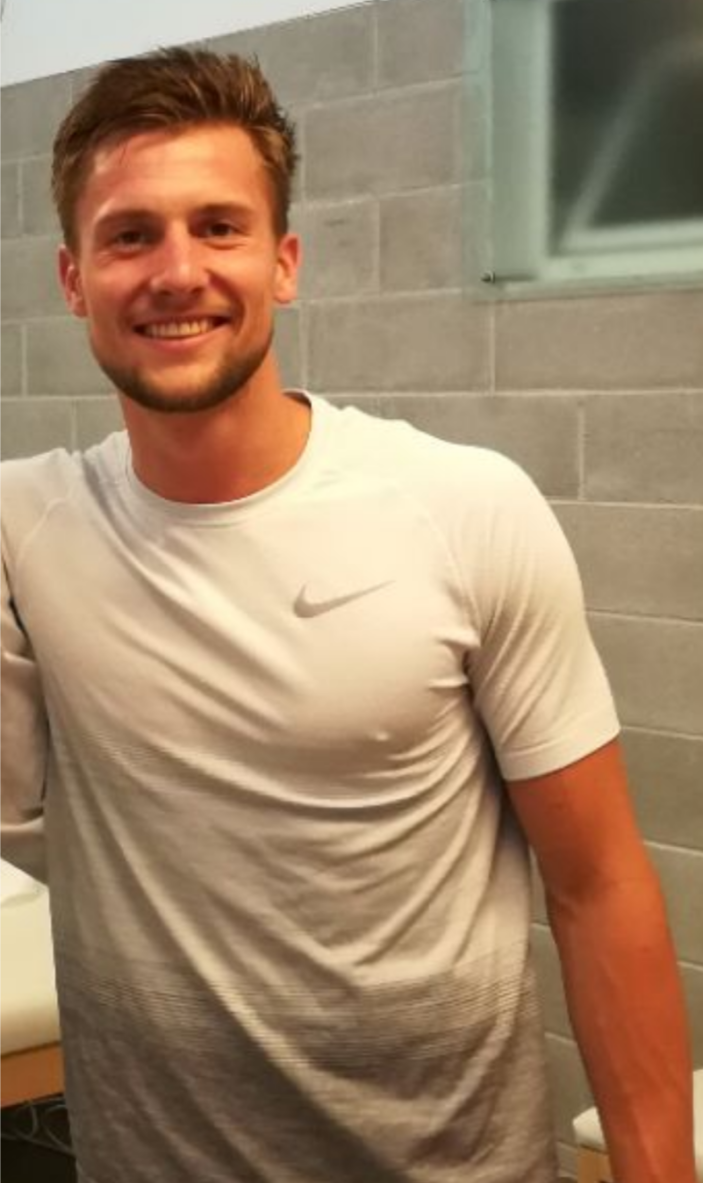
- Ter Avest in 2018

Personal information
- Full name: Hidde Willem ter Avest
- Date of birth: 20 May 1997 (age 29)
- Place of birth: Wierden, Netherlands
- Height: 1.82 m (6 ft 0 in)
- Position: Right-back

Team information
- Current team: Willem II
- Number: 5

Youth career
- SVZW Wierden
- 2008–2015: Twente

Senior career*
Years	Team	Apps	(Gls)
2014–2015	Jong Twente	2	(1)
2015–2018	Twente	92	(2)
2018–2021	Udinese	39	(0)
2021–2024	Utrecht	91	(3)
2024–2026	Oxford United	34	(1)
2026–	Willem II	0	(0)

International career
2012	Netherlands U15	2	(0)
2013	Netherlands U16	5	(0)
2013–2014	Netherlands U17	8	(0)
2014	Netherlands U18	3	(1)
2014–2016	Netherlands U19	13	(0)
2016–2017	Netherlands U20	6	(0)
2017	Netherlands U21	1	(0)
- * Club domestic league appearances and goals as of 2 May 2026

Hidde Willem ter Avest (born 20 May 1997) is a Dutch professional footballer who plays as a right-back for Eredivisie club Willem II.

== Club career ==
=== Twente ===
Ter Avest began his football journey at SVZW Wierden before joining the Twente academy at age eleven. His leadership skills shone as he captained various youth teams. In 2013, he signed a three-year development contract with Twente.

His debut for the reserve team Jong FC Twente came on 22 August 2014, against Almere City in the second-tier Eerste Divisie, securing a starting position. Later that year, on 17 December, he made his first-team debut, replacing Orlando Engelaar in a cup match against De Graafschap. He officially joined Twente's squad in February 2015, marking his Eredivisie debut as a starter against Excelsior on 7 February, despite a 3–1 loss.

Becoming a regular starter from the 2015–16 season onward, Ter Avest even took on the captain's role on occasions during the 2017–18 season in the absence of Stefan Thesker and Danny Holla. Unfortunately, during a match against Utrecht on 25 February 2018, he sustained a fractured ankle, ending his season prematurely. This injury was compounded by the team's relegation to the Eerste Divisie at the end of that season after finishing bottom of the Eredivisie.

=== Udinese ===
On 15 June 2018, Ter Avest signed a four-year deal with Serie A club Udinese. He made his debut for the club on 20 October 2018 during the match against Genoa, where he replaced Valon Behrami in the 63rd minute of a 2–2 draw.

After seeing reduced playing time with Udinese, he was allowed to leave on a free transfer in January 2021. At that point, he had made 42 total appearances for the club.

=== Utrecht ===
On 13 January 2021, Ter Avest signed a contract with Eredivisie club Utrecht until 2024, with technical director Jordy Zuidam stating: "Hidde is a player with a strong competitive mindset, great endurance, and a forward-driving ambition...With his playing style, Hidde fits perfectly with the club. We're delighted to have him on board at FC Utrecht." On 16 January, he made his debut for Utrecht against Heracles Almelo, starting in a 2–0 win. He quickly established himself as a regular starter in the team. On 30 January, he scored his first goal for the club, equalising late in a 3–3 draw against PEC Zwolle. Then, on 19 February, Ter Avest contributing both a goal and an assist in a commanding 6–0 victory over Willem II. Throughout his first full season with Utrecht, Ter Avest was a key player, featuring in 30 matches across all competitions.

In the 2022–23 season, Ter Avest lost his starting spot to Sean Klaiber who had returned to the club from Ajax. After Klaiber's move to Brøndby on 1 September 2023, Ter Avest reclaimed his position as starting right-back in the team. However, in March 2024, it was announced that his expiring contract with Utrecht would not be renewed.

=== Oxford United ===
On 19 August 2024, ter Avest signed for EFL Championship club Oxford United. He made his first appearance (as a substitute) in a 2–0 away defeat at Sunderland on 26 October, and scored his first goal during his full debut, a 1–0 home victory over Hull City, on 5 November.

On 11 May 2026 the club said the player would leave in the summer when his contract expired.

=== Willem II ===
On 28 July 2026, ter Avest returned to the Netherlands and signed with Willem II for one season.

== International career ==
Ter Avest was a member of the Netherlands U17 national team beaten on penalties by England in the final of the 2014 UEFA European Under-17 Championship.

== Style of play ==
Ter Avest is a right-back who combines technical skill with physical pace. He is capable of defending in man-marking schemes, contributing to the attack, and playing as a center-back due to his aerial ability.

== Career statistics ==
As of match played 28 February 2026

Appearances and goals by club, season and competition
Club	Season	League			National cup (Note: Includes KNVB Cup, Coppa Italia, FA Cup)		Europe		Other		Total	
Club	Season	Division	Apps	Goals	Apps	Goals	Apps	Goals	Apps	Goals	Apps	Goals
Jong Twente	2014–15	Eerste Divisie	2	1	—		—		—		2	1
Twente	2014–15	Eredivisie	10	0	2	0	—		—		12	0
Twente	2015–16	Eredivisie	29	1	1	1	—		—		30	2
Twente	2016–17	Eredivisie	31	1	1	0	—		—		32	1
Twente	2017–18	Eredivisie	22	0	4	0	—		—		26	0
Twente	Total		92	2	8	1	—		—		100	3
Udinese	2018–19	Serie A	13	0	1	0	—		—		14	0
Udinese	2019–20	Serie A	20	0	2	0	—		—		22	0
Udinese	2020–21	Serie A	6	0	0	0	—		—		6	0
Udinese	Total		39	0	3	0	—		—		42	0
Utrecht	2020–21	Eredivisie	18	2	—		—		2 (Note: Appearance(s) in Eredivisie European play-offs)	0	20	2
Utrecht	2021–22	Eredivisie	26	1	2	0	—		2	0	30	1
Utrecht	2022–23	Eredivisie	20	0	4	0	—		1	0	25	0
Utrecht	2023–24	Eredivisie	23	0	2	0	—		—		25	0
Utrecht	Total		87	3	8	0	—		5	0	100	3
Oxford United	2024–25	Championship	21	1	1	0	—		0	0	22	1
Oxford United	2025–26	Championship	8	0	0	0	—		1 (Note: Appearance in EFL Cup)	0	9	0
Oxford United	Total		29	1	1	0	—		1	0	31	1
Career total			249	7	19	1	—		6	0	275	8

== Honours ==
Netherlands U17

- UEFA European Under-17 Championship runners-up: 2014
