= Mitchell van Rooijen =

Dutch footballer (born 1998)

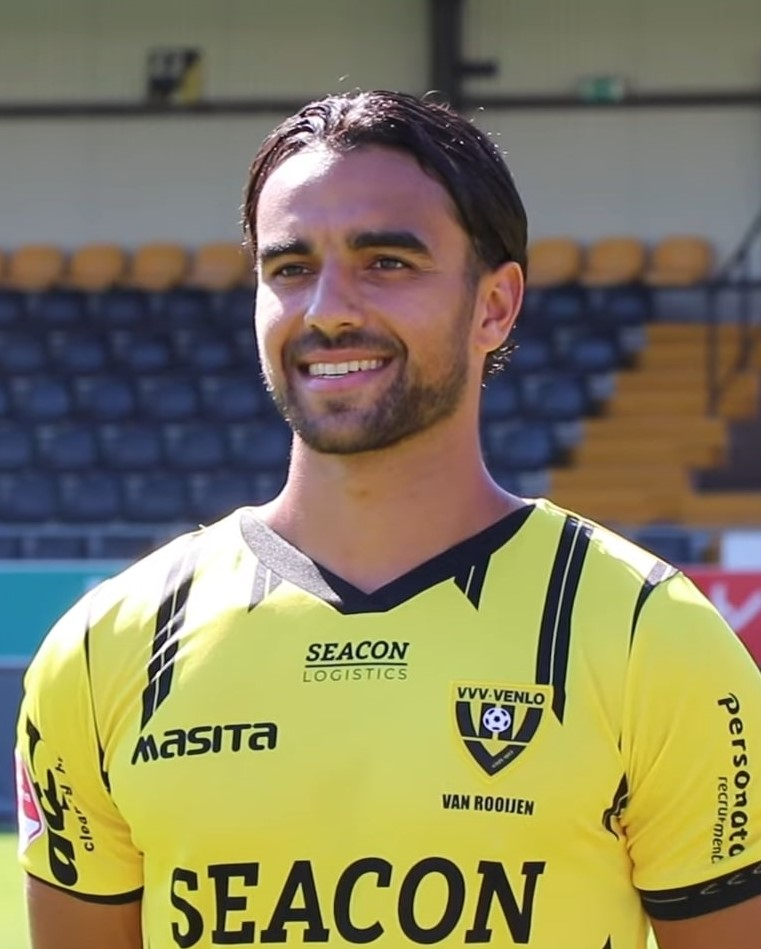
- Van Rooijen with VVV-Venlo in 2022

Personal information
- Date of birth: 22 December 1998 (age 27)
- Place of birth: Utrecht, Netherlands
- Height: 1.78 m (5 ft 10 in)
- Position: Central midfielder

Team information
- Current team: Genemuiden

Youth career
- 2004–2008: Delta Sports '95
- 2008–2016: Utrecht

Senior career*
Years	Team	Apps	(Gls)
2016–2021	Jong Utrecht	72	(9)
2016–2021	Utrecht	1	(0)
2020–2021	→ Excelsior (loan)	24	(1)
2021–2023	VVV-Venlo	57	(8)
2023–2024	Manchego Ciudad Real	31	(0)
2024–2026	TOP Oss	45	(2)
2026–	Genemuiden	0	(0)

International career
2015	Netherlands U18	2	(0)
2016	Netherlands U19	5	(1)
2017	Netherlands U20	4	(0)
- * Club domestic league appearances and goals as of 28 April 2026

Mitchell van Rooijen (born 22 December 1998) is a Dutch professional footballer who plays as a central midfielder for Derde Divisie club Genemuiden.

== Club career ==
=== Utrecht ===
Van Rooijen was born in Utrecht, but moved to Houten with his parents at a young age. In 2008, he moved from local amateur club Delta Sports '95 to the youth academy of FC Utrecht. He signed his first youth contract with that club in 2015, before being promoted to the second team competing in the second-tier Eerste Divisie the following year, in 2016. On 5 August 2016 he made his professional debut for the team, starting on the opening day of the 2016–17 Eerste Divisie in a 4–1 away loss to NAC Breda at the Rat Verlegh Stadion. On 22 December 2016, his 18th birthday, he signed a contract extension with FC Utrecht until 2020, with an option for an additional year. He scored a scorpion kick on 26 April 2019 in a league game for Jong Utrecht against Helmond Sport.

In March 2020, the option was exercised by FC Utrecht, automatically extending the deal until 2021, and a few months later, in July 2020, he signed a new contract keeping him part of Utrecht until 2023. Earlier that year, on 17 January 2020, Van Rooijen, who had become team captain of Jong Utrecht, had made his debut for the first team in the Eredivisie in a 3–3 away draw against PEC Zwolle. Due to a number of injuries in the first team, head coach John van den Brom included Van Rooijen in the starting lineup that day, before replacing him in the 66th minute for Urby Emanuelson after suffering a groin injury.

Van Rooijen was sent on a season-long loan to Eerste Divisie club Excelsior on 4 August 2020. He would play regularly for the club, making 26 total appearances in which he scored once. After the season, he returned to Utrecht.

=== VVV-Venlo ===
Van Rooijen moved to VVV-Venlo on 26 July 2021, signing a two-year contract with an option for an extra season. He made his debut on the first matchday of the 2021–22 season, starting in a 2–2 home draw against NAC Breda. On 5 November 2021, he scored his first goal for the club, equalizing in the home match against Jong Ajax, which would eventually finish in a 3–1 loss. He made 26 total appearances in his first season with VVV, scoring six goals.

Van Rooijen left VVV at the end of the 2022–23 season, as his contract was not extended.

=== Manchego Ciudad Real ===
On 25 August 2023, Van Rooijen signed with Spanish fourth-tier Segunda Federación club Manchego Ciudad Real. He made his debut for the club on 3 September, coming on as a substitute in the 59th minute as Manchego lost 1–0 to Águilas. He was a regular starter throughout the season, during which Manchego suffered relegation to the Tercera Federación.

=== TOP Oss ===
On 28 June 2024, Van Rooijen returned to the Netherlands, signing for Eerste Divisie club TOP Oss on a two-year deal.

== Career statistics ==
=== Club ===
As of match played 2 May 2025

Appearances and goals by club, season and competition
Club	Season	League			National Cup		Other		Total	
Club	Season	Division	Apps	Goals	Apps	Goals	Apps	Goals	Apps	Goals
Jong Utrecht	2016–17	Eerste Divisie	13	3	—		—		13	3
Jong Utrecht	2017–18	Eerste Divisie	17	0	—		—		17	0
Jong Utrecht	2018–19	Eerste Divisie	22	4	—		—		22	4
Jong Utrecht	2019–20	Eerste Divisie	20	2	—		—		20	2
Jong Utrecht	Total		72	9	—		—		72	9
Utrecht	2019–20	Eredivisie	1	0	0	0	—		0	0
Utrecht	2020–21	Eredivisie	0	0	0	0	—		0	0
Utrecht	Total		1	0	0	0	—		1	0
Excelsior (loan)	2020–21	Eerste Divisie	24	1	2	0	—		26	1
VVV-Venlo	2021–22	Eerste Divisie	25	6	1	0	—		26	6
VVV-Venlo	2022–23	Eerste Divisie	32	2	2	0	4 (Note: Appearances in Eredivisie promotion/relegation playoffs)	1	38	3
VVV-Venlo	Total		57	8	3	0	4	1	64	9
Manchego Ciudad Real	2023–24	Segunda Federación	31	0	0	0	—		31	0
TOP Oss	2024–25	Eerste Divisie	31	0	0	0	—		31	0
Career total			216	17	5	0	4	1	225	18
