= Emil Bergström =

Swedish footballer (born 1993)

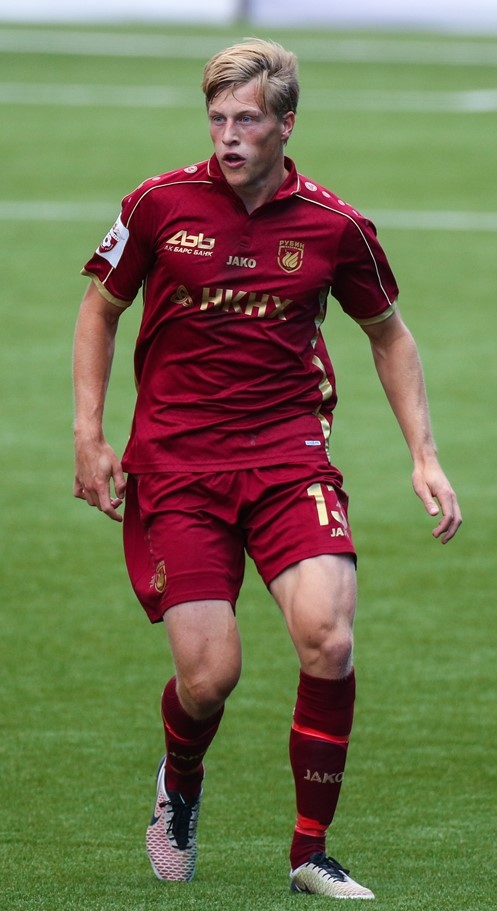
- Bergström with Rubin Kazan in 2016

Personal information
- Full name: Emil Evert Bergström
- Date of birth: 19 May 1993 (age 33)
- Place of birth: Stockholm, Sweden
- Height: 1.88 m (6 ft 2 in)
- Position: Centre-back

Team information
- Current team: Anorthosis
- Number: 31

Youth career
- 2002–2006: Spånga IS
- 2007–2008: IF Brommapojkarna
- 2008–2011: Djurgårdens IF

Senior career*
Years	Team	Apps	(Gls)
2011–2015	Djurgårdens IF	129	(7)
2016–2018	Rubin Kazan	16	(1)
2017–2018	→ Grasshopper (loan)	53	(3)
2018–2022	Utrecht	23	(2)
2019–2020	→ Basel (loan)	8	(0)
2021–2022	→ Willem II (loan)	13	(0)
2022–2023	Górnik Zabrze	25	(2)
2023–2025	Panserraikos	61	(1)
2025–	Anorthosis	24	(0)

International career
2010–2012	Sweden U19	10	(0)
2012–2015	Sweden U21	4	(0)
2015–2016	Sweden	3	(0)
- * Club domestic league appearances and goals as of 14 June 2026

Emil Evert Bergström (born 19 May 1993) is a Swedish professional footballer who plays as a centre-back for Anorthosis.

== Club career ==
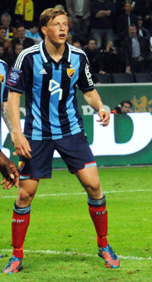
Bergström playing for Djurgården in 2013.

Bergström made the move to Djurgården from IF Brommapojkarna as a youth player at the age of fifteen as he wanted to be at a bigger club. He had started out as a forward and then moved down to midfield before eventually finding his place in central defence. In 2010, he started getting a lot of playing time with the club's U21 team.

On 15 April 2011, Bergström made his Allsvenskan debut against Malmö FF as a substitute. Midway through the following 2012 Allsvenskan season Bergström had become a regular starter at the central defence position. On 30 June 2013, he scored his first league goal, which was also the historical last goal for Djurgården at Stockholms stadion before the club moved to their new home stadium Tele2 Arena.

On 4 February 2016, Bergström signed a contract with FC Rubin Kazan.

On 27 January 2017, he signed a loan contract with Grasshoppers that ran until the end of the 2017–18 season.

On 30 July 2018, he signed with Utrecht.

On 2 September 2019, Basel announced that Bergström was taken up on a loan contract until the end of the season. He played his first game for the club in the away game in the Swiss Cup on 15 September as Basel won 3–0 against FC Meyrin. He played his domestic league debut for the club in the home game at the St. Jakob-Park on 25 September as Basel won 4–0 against Zürich. The contract came to an end on 30 June and the club announced that they would not prolong it. During the ten months he was with the club, Bergström played a total 15 matches without scoring a goal. Eight of these games were in the Swiss Super League, one in the Swiss Cup, two in the UEFA Europa League and four were friendly games.

On 1 July 2021, he moved on loan to Willem II.

After his contract with Utrecht concluded at the end of June 2022, Bergström remained a free agent until 26 September 2022, when he signed with Polish Ekstraklasa side Górnik Zabrze until the end of the season.

On 14 August 2023, he moved to Panserraikos, until the summer of 2025.

== International career ==
Bergström has represented both the Sweden U19 national team and Sweden U21. In January 2015 he played his first game with the senior national team. The game was however not recognised as an official national team game by FIFA.

== Personal life ==
Bergström grew up a Djurgårdens IF supporter from the age of three when his father started bringing him along to watch home games. He wears a protective mouthguard when he plays after getting his teeth knocked out by a spring rider when he was a child. His favourite number is 13.

== Career statistics ==
=== Club ===
As of match played on 2 October 2025

Appearances and goals by club, season and competition
Club	Season	League			Cup		Continental		Other		Total	
Club	Season	Division	Apps	Goals	Apps	Goals	Apps	Goals	Apps	Goals	Apps	Goals
Djurgården	2011	Allsvenskan	18	0	1	0	—		—		19	0
Djurgården	2012	Allsvenskan	23	1	1	0	—		—		24	1
Djurgården	2013	Allsvenskan	29	2	6	0	—		—		35	2
Djurgården	2014	Allsvenskan	30	2	3	1	—		—		33	3
Djurgården	2015	Allsvenskan	29	2	4	1	—		—		33	3
Djurgården	Total		129	7	15	2	—		—		144	9
Rubin Kazan	2015–16	Russian Premier League	12	1	0	0	—		—		12	1
Rubin Kazan	2016–17	Russian Premier League	4	0	1	0	—		—		5	0
Rubin Kazan	Total		16	1	1	0	—		—		17	1
Grasshoppers (loan)	2016–17	Swiss Super League	18	1	0	0	—		—		18	1
Grasshoppers (loan)	2017–18	Swiss Super League	35	2	5	0	—		—		40	2
Grasshoppers (loan)	Total		53	3	5	0	—		—		58	3
Utrecht	2018–19	Eredivisie	13	1	2	0	—		—		15	1
Utrecht	2019–20	Eredivisie	1	0	0	0	2	0	—		3	0
Utrecht	2020–21	Eredivisie	9	0	0	0	—		—		9	0
Utrecht	Total		23	1	2	0	2	0	—		27	1
Basel (loan)	2019–20	Swiss Super League	8	0	1	0	2	0	—		11	0
Willem II (loan)	2021–22	Eredivisie	13	0	1	0	—		—		14	0
Górnik Zabrze	2022–23	Ekstraklasa	25	2	2	0	—		—		27	2
Panserraikos	2023–24	Superleague Greece	30	1	2	0	—		—		32	1
Panserraikos	2024–25	Superleague Greece	31	0	1	0	—		—		32	0
Panserraikos	Total		61	1	3	0	—		—		64	1
Anorthosis	2025–26	Cypriot First Division	3	0	0	0	—		—		3	0
Career total			331	15	30	2	4	0	0	0	365	17

=== International ===
As of 11 December 2016

Appearances and goals by national team and year
National team	Year	Apps	Goals
Sweden	2015	1 (Note: Unofficial match.)	0
Sweden	2016	2	0
Total		3	0
