= Gyrano Kerk =

Surinamese footballer

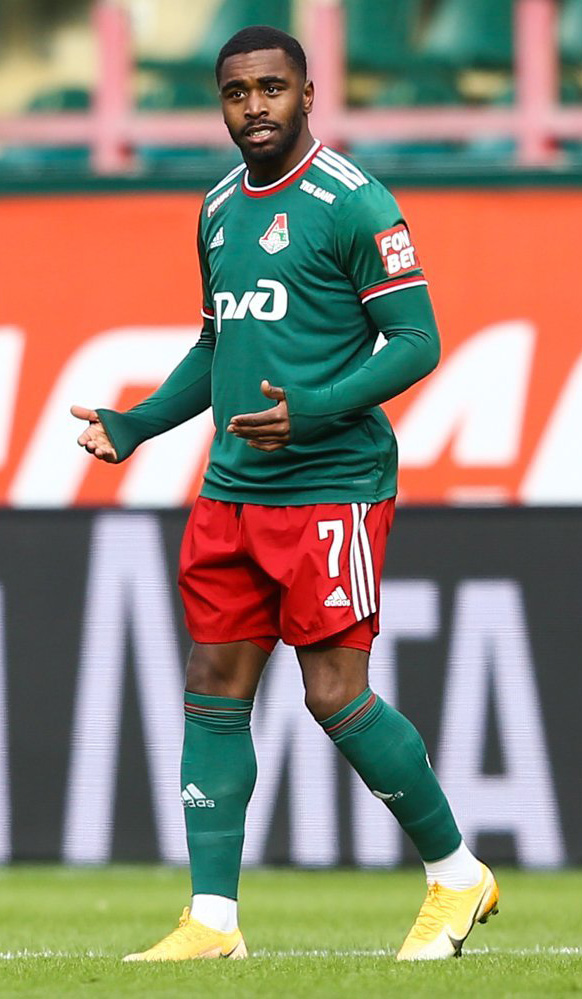
- Kerk with Lokomotiv Moscow in 2022

Personal information
- Full name: Gyrano Emilio Kerk
- Date of birth: 2 December 1995 (age 30)
- Place of birth: Amsterdam, Netherlands
- Height: 1.84 m (6 ft 0 in)
- Positions: Right winger; forward

Team information
- Current team: Erzurumspor
- Number: 9

Youth career
- –2010: HFC Haarlem
- 2010–2011: DWS
- 2011–2012: Zeeburgia
- 2012–2014: Utrecht

Senior career*
Years	Team	Apps	(Gls)
2014–2021	Utrecht	155	(37)
2015–2016	→ Helmond Sport (loan)	34	(7)
2016–2017	→ Jong Utrecht	12	(8)
2021–2024	Lokomotiv Moscow	40	(7)
2023–2024	→ Royal Antwerp (loan)	51	(9)
2024–2026	Royal Antwerp	66	(10)
2026–	Erzurumspor	4	(0)

International career^{‡}
2024–	Suriname	15	(3)
- * Club domestic league appearances and goals as of 10 October 2026 ‡ National team caps and goals as of 28 September 2026

Gyrano Emilio Kerk (born 2 December 1995) is a professional footballer who plays as a right winger for Süper Lig club Erzurumspor. Born in the Netherlands, he plays for the Suriname national team.

== Club career ==
Kerk started his club career at Utrecht in the Eredivisie. Kerk is a youth exponent from FC Utrecht. He made his Eredivisie debut on 28 September 2014 in a 3–1 away defeat against FC Twente. One week later, he scored his first goal against Go Ahead Eagles in a 3–2 home defeat.

=== Lokomotiv Moscow ===
On 1 September 2021, Kerk signed a four-year contract with Russian club Lokomotiv Moscow.

==== Loan to Royal Antwerp ====
On 21 January 2023, Lokomotiv announced that Kerk would finish the 2022–23 season on loan with Antwerp in Belgium. Antwerp confirmed the transfer on 28 January 2023. On 4 June, Kerk scored a goal for Antwerp in their 2–2 draw against Genk on the final day of the Belgian Pro League season, a result which secured the club their first league title in 66 years.

On 30 August 2023, he helped the club secure a spot in the group stage of the UEFA Champions League for the first time ever, by scoring a goal in the second leg of their 3–1 aggregate victory over AEK Athens in the play-off round.

==== Release by Lokomotiv ====
On 4 July 2024, Lokomotiv announced that Kerk's contract with the club has been suspended under FIFA regulations for the 2024–25 season, and as it was expiring at the end of the same season, he effectively became a free agent.

=== Erzurumspor ===
Gyrano Kerk signed for Turkish club Erzurumspor on a free transfer from Royal Antwerp on 30 July 2026.

== International career ==
Born in the Netherlands, Kerk is of Surinamese descent. He was called up to the Suriname national team for a set of World Cup qualifier matches in June 2024. He made his debut for Suriname on 5 June 2024 against Saint Vincent and the Grenadines at the Dr. Ir. Franklin Essed Stadion. He started the game and played 63 minutes as Suriname won 4–1.

Kerk went on to feature in three CONCACAF Nations League games in the remainder of 2024 against Guadeloupe, Costa Rica and Guyana.

== Career statistics ==
As of match played 11 November 2023

Appearances and goals by club, season and competition
Club	Season	League			National cup (Note: Includes KNVB Cup, Russian Cup, Belgian Cup)		Continental		Other		Total	
Club	Season	Division	Apps	Goals	Apps	Goals	Apps	Goals	Apps	Goals	Apps	Goals
Utrecht	2013–14	Eredivisie	0	0	1	0	—		—		1	0
Utrecht	2014–15	Eredivisie	4	1	0	0	—		—		4	1
Utrecht	2016–17	Eredivisie	15	3	1	0	—		3 (Note: Appearances in Eredivisie European play-offs)	1	19	4
Utrecht	2017–18	Eredivisie	30	6	1	1	6 (Note: Appearances in UEFA Europa League)	1	4	0	41	8
Utrecht	2018–19	Eredivisie	33	8	3	1	—		4	0	40	9
Utrecht	2019–20	Eredivisie	24	10	4	0	2	1	—		30	11
Utrecht	2020–21	Eredivisie	34	8	2	1	—		2	0	38	9
Utrecht	2021–22	Eredivisie	2	0	—		—		—		2	0
Utrecht	Total		142	36	12	3	8	2	13	1	175	42
Helmond Sport (loan)	2015–16	Eerste Divisie	34	7	2	0	—		—		36	7
Jong FC Utrecht	2016–17	Eerste Divisie	12	8	—		—		—		12	8
Lokomotiv Moscow	2021–22	Russian Premier League	23	5	1	0	4	0	—		28	5
Lokomotiv Moscow	2022–23	Russian Premier League	17	2	6	1	—		—		23	3
Lokomotiv Moscow	Total		40	7	7	1	4	0	—		51	8
Royal Antwerp (loan)	2022–23	Belgian Pro League	18	6	3	0	—		—		21	6
Royal Antwerp (loan)	2023–24	Belgian Pro League	13	1	1	0	4 (Note: Appearances in UEFA Champions League)	1	1 (Note: Appearance in Belgian Super Cup)	0	19	2
Royal Antwerp (loan)	Total		31	7	4	0	4	1	1	0	40	8
Career total			259	65	25	4	16	3	14	1	314	73

=== International goals ===
No.	Date	Venue	Opponent	Score	Result	Competition
1.	21 March 2025	Dr. Ir. Franklin Essed Stadion, Paramaribo, Suriname	Martinique	1–0	1–0	2025 CONCACAF Gold Cup qualification
2.	15 June 2025	Snapdragon Stadium, San Diego, United States	Costa Rica	1–2	3–4	2025 CONCACAF Gold Cup
3.	28 September 2026	Dr. Ir. Franklin Essed Stadion, Paramaribo, Suriname	Martinique	2–0	2–1	2026–27 CONCACAF Nations League A

== Honours ==
Royal Antwerp

- Belgian Pro League: 2022–23
- Belgian Cup: 2022–23
- Belgian Super Cup: 2023
