= 2016–17 AZ Alkmaar season =

Dutch association football season in the Eredivisie

AZ
2016–17 season
- Chairman: René Neelissen
- Manager: John van den Brom
- Ground: AFAS Stadion
- Eredivisie: 6th
- KNVB Cup: Runners-up

During the 2016–17 season, AZ competed in the Eredivisie for the 19th consecutive season and the KNVB Cup.

== Eredivisie ==
=== League table ===
Pos	Team	Pld	W	D	L	GF	GA	GD	Pts	Qualification or relegation
4	Utrecht (O)	34	18	8	8	54	38	+16	62	Qualification for the European competition play-offs (Note: Four teams played for a spot in the Europa League second qualifying round.)
5	Vitesse	34	15	6	13	51	40	+11	51	Qualification for the Europa League group stage (Note: Vitesse qualified for the Europa League group stage by winning the 2016–17 KNVB Cup.)
6	AZ	34	12	13	9	56	52	+4	49	Qualification for the European competition play-offs
7	Twente (Note: Twente was excluded from European football for 3 years on 15 December 2015.)	34	12	9	13	48	50	−2	45	
8	Groningen	34	10	13	11	55	51	+4	43	Qualification for the European competition play-offs

Source: NUsport (in Dutch), Soccerway
Rules for classification: 1) Points; 2) Goal difference; 3) Goals scored; 4) Play-off (only for deciding champion and relegation); 5) Head-to-head points; 6) Head-to-head goal difference; 7) Head-to-head away goals scored; 8) Draw. (Note: Criteria 5-8 is only used if deciding Europa League play-off places)
(O) Play-off winners
Notes:

7 August 2016 1	AZ	2–2	SC Heerenveen	Alkmaar
	Jahanbakhsh 33'; Wuytens (yellow card) 43'; Weghorst 52' (pen.); García (yellow card) 88'	Report	Bijker (yellow card) 20'; Zeneli 40'; van Amersfoort (yellow card) 51'; van Aken (yellow card) 57'; Huizing (yellow card) 68' (yellow-red card) 71'; Schaars 82'; Veerman (yellow card) 90+5'	Stadium: AFAS Stadion; Referee: Danny Makkelie

14 August 2016 2	PSV	1–0	AZ	Eindhoven
	Locadia (yellow card) 45+1'; Isimat-Mirin (yellow card) 45+2'; Moreno 52'	Report	dos Santos (yellow card) 71'	Stadium: Philips Stadion; Attendance: 34,000

21 August 2016 3	FC Utrecht	1–2	AZ	Utrecht
	Joosten 53'	Report	Henriksen 25'; Haps (yellow card) 29'; Jahanbakhsh 84'	Stadium: Stadion Galgenwaard; Attendance: 15,570; Referee: Richard Liesveld

28 August 2016 4	AZ	2–0	NEC	Alkmaar
	dos Santos 43', (yellow card) 52'; Jahanbakhsh 73'	Report	von Haacke (yellow card) 33' (yellow-red card) 52'; Mayi (yellow card) 54'	Stadium: AFAS Stadion; Attendance: 13,412; Referee: Kevin Blom

10 September 2016 5	AZ	2–0	Willem II	Alkmaar
	Jahanbakhsh 19'; Haps (yellow card) 76'; García 90+2'	Report	Haye (yellow card) 37'; Koppers (yellow card) 44'; Falkenburg (yellow card) 74'	Stadium: AFAS Stadion; Attendance: 13,839; Referee: Bjoern Kuipers

18 September 2016 6	PEC Zwolle	0–2	AZ	Zwolle
	Schenkeveld (yellow card) 19'; Marcellis (yellow card) 29'	Report	Bel Hassani (yellow card) 34'; Haps (yellow card) 41'; Weghorst 43'; Johansson (yellow card) 61'; Rienstra (yellow card) 64'; Til 87'	Stadium: MAC3PARK Stadion; Attendance: 12,900; Referee: Danny Makkelie

24 September 2016 7	AZ	2–2	Go Ahead Eagles	Alkmaar
	Weghorst 37' (pen.), 52'; Luckassen (yellow card) 39'	Report	Lambooij (yellow card) 36'; Duits 66'; Hendriks 87'	Stadium: AFAS Stadion; Attendance: 13,774; Referee: Bas Nijhuis

2 October 2016 8	AZ	1–1	Sparta Rotterdam	Rotterdam
	Breuer 39'; El Azzouzi (yellow card) 43'; Dougall (yellow card) 58'; Dumfries (yellow card) 82' (yellow-red card) 90+3'	Report	Til 6'; van Eijden (yellow card) 41'; Luckassen (yellow card) 43'	Stadium: Sparta Stadion; Attendance: 10,261; Referee: Richard Liesveld
