= Nick Venema =

Dutch footballer (born 1999)

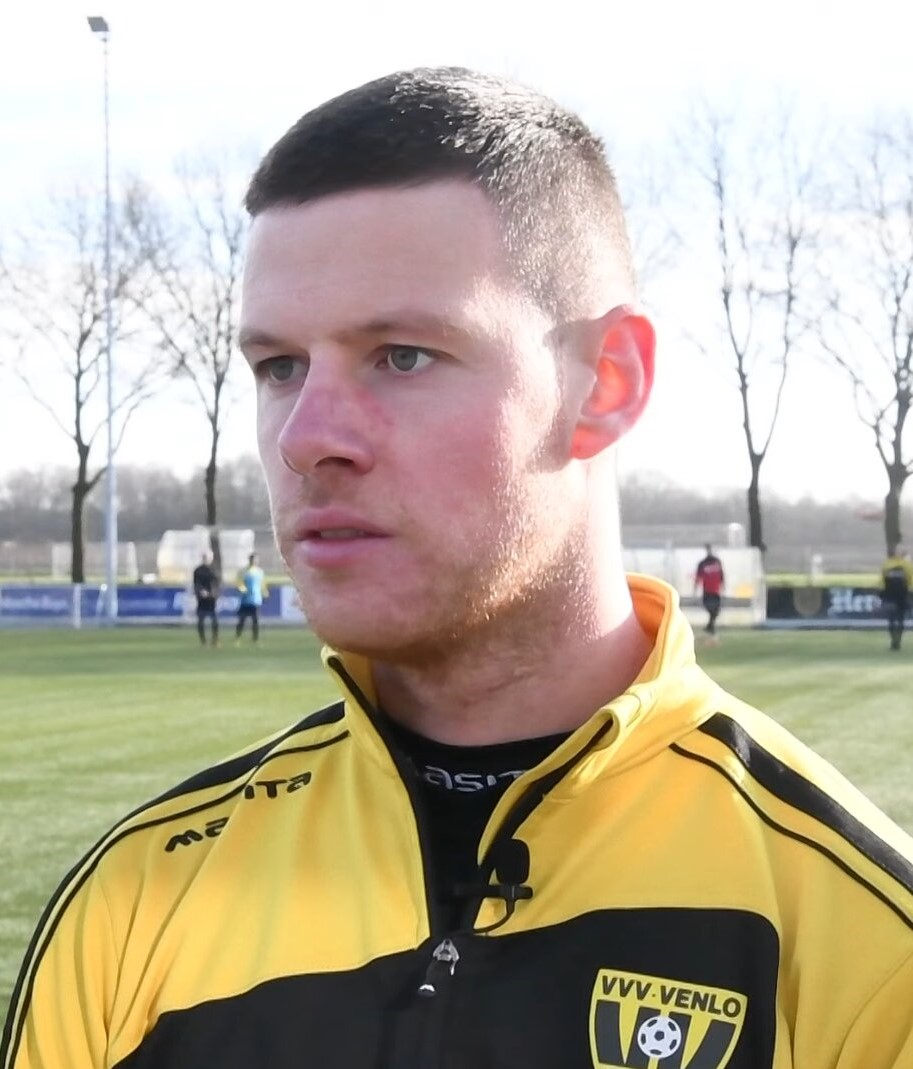
- Venema in 2023

Personal information
- Date of birth: 9 April 1999 (age 27)
- Place of birth: Austerlitz, Netherlands
- Height: 1.81 m (5 ft 11 in)
- Positions: Forward; winger

Team information
- Current team: Dordrecht
- Number: 7

Youth career
- 2004–2011: SV Austerlitz
- 2011–2012: VV Woudenberg
- 2012–2014: Roda '46
- 2014–2016: Utrecht

Senior career*
Years	Team	Apps	(Gls)
2016–2022	Jong Utrecht	77	(43)
2017–2022	Utrecht	24	(6)
2019–2020	→ Almere City (loan)	24	(6)
2020–2021	→ NAC Breda (loan)	31	(5)
2022	→ VVV-Venlo (loan)	16	(7)
2022–2023	VVV-Venlo	36	(11)
2023–2025	Valenciennes	40	(4)
2024–2025	Valenciennes II	3	(0)
2025–	Dordrecht	42	(9)

International career
2016–2017	Netherlands U17	2	(0)
2017	Netherlands U19	6	(2)
- * Club domestic league appearances and goals as of 15:44, 5 October 2026 (UTC)

Nick Venema (born 9 April 1999) is a Dutch professional footballer who plays as a winger and forward for Eerste Divisie club Dordrecht.

== Club career ==
=== Utrecht ===
Venema played for several clubs in his youth, including hometown club SV Austerlitz, VW Woudenberg, and Roda '46, before joining the FC Utrecht youth academy. He made his professional debut in the Eerste Divisie for the reserve team Jong FC Utrecht on 5 August 2016, in a game against NAC Breda.

He made his Eredivisie debut for FC Utrecht on 12 February 2017, in a game against PSV Eindhoven, coming on as a substitute for Richairo Živković. He scored his first goal for the senior squad on 29 October 2017, in a 2–2 home draw against NAC Breda. The goal came in the 78th minute, seven minutes after Venema has been subbed on for Cyriel Dessers. His goal was the equalizer, and the last goal of the game.

==== Loan to Almere City ====
On 28 August 2019, he joined Almere City on a season-long loan.

==== Loan to NAC Breda ====
On 27 August 2020, he joined NAC Breda on a season-long loan. He made 32 appearances during the season in which he scored five goals, as NAC missed out on promotion to the Eredivisie in the finals of the play-offs.

==== Return to Utrecht ====
Venema returned to Utrecht ahead of the 2021–22 season, where he once again became part of the reserve team Jong FC Utrecht. There, he took on a new role as the experienced striker under head coach Darije Kalezić.

=== VVV-Venlo ===
On 24 December 2021, Venema was loaned to VVV-Venlo for the rest of the season. On 22 June 2022, the deal was made permanent and Venema signed a three-year deal with the club.

=== Valenciennes ===
On 15 August 2023, VVV-Venlo announced Venema's transfer to French club Valenciennes.

=== Dordrecht ===
After joining FC Dordrecht under manager Dirk Kuyt in 2025, he made his debut in a 1–0 win over SC Cambuur on 8 August 2025.

== International career ==
Venema made his debut for the Netherlands U17 team on 7 February 2016, in a friendly against Portugal. He played 70 minutes of that match, and the game ended 1–1. His U19 debut came on 30 August 2017, in a 2–1 friendly loss to Belgium. He only played 18 minutes of that match. His first and second international goals came in the same game, a friendly against Finland. The game ended 9–0 in favour of the Netherlands, with Venema scoring the 8th and 9th goals, in the 80th and 90th minute respectively. He only played 18 minutes of that game as well.

== Career statistics ==
As of match played 11 September 2026

Appearances and goals by club, season and competition
Club	Season	League			National cup (Note: Includes KNVB Cup, Coupe de France)		Europe		Other		Total	
Club	Season	Division	Apps	Goals	Apps	Goals	Apps	Goals	Apps	Goals	Apps	Goals
Jong Utrecht	2016–17	Eerste Divisie	12	7	—		—		—		12	7
Jong Utrecht	2017–18	Eerste Divisie	23	12	—		—		—		23	12
Jong Utrecht	2018–19	Eerste Divisie	23	16	—		—		—		23	16
Jong Utrecht	2019–20	Eerste Divisie	0	0	—		—		—		0	0
Jong Utrecht	2020–21	Eerste Divisie	0	0	—		—		—		0	0
Jong Utrecht	2021–22	Eerste Divisie	19	8	—		—		—		19	8
Jong Utrecht	Total		77	43	—		—		—		77	43
Utrecht	2016–17	Eredivisie	3	0	0	0	—		—		3	0
Utrecht	2017–18	Eredivisie	3	1	1	0	0	0	0	0	4	1
Utrecht	2018–19	Eredivisie	15	4	2	1	—		0	0	17	5
Utrecht	2019–20	Eredivisie	3	1	0	0	1 (Note: Appearance in UEFA Europa League)	0	—		4	1
Utrecht	Total		24	6	3	1	1	0	0	0	28	7
Almere City (loan)	2019–20	Eerste Divisie	24	6	1	0	—		—		25	6
NAC Breda (loan)	2020–21	Eerste Divisie	31	5	1	0	—		0	0	32	5
VVV-Venlo (loan)	2021–22	Eerste Divisie	16	7	0	0	—		—		16	7
VVV-Venlo	2022–23	Eerste Divisie	36	11	2	1	—		2 (Note: Appearances in Eredivisie promotion/relegation playoffs)	2	40	14
VVV-Venlo	Total		52	18	2	1	—		2	2	56	21
Valenciennes	2023–24	Ligue 2	23	3	4	0	—		—		27	3
Valenciennes	2024–25	Championnat National	17	1	3	0	—		—		20	1
Valenciennes	Total		40	4	7	0	—		—		47	4
Valenciennes II	2023–24	National 3	1	0	—		—		—		1	0
Valenciennes II	2024–25	National 3	2	0	—		—		—		2	0
Valenciennes II	Total		3	0	—		—		—		3	0
Dordrecht	2025–26	Eerste Divisie	36	9	1	0	—		—		37	9
Dordrecht	2026–27	Eerste Divisie	6	0	0	0	—		—		6	0
Dordrecht	Total		42	9	1	0	—		—		43	9
Career total			293	91	15	2	1	0	2	2	311	95
