= Sander van de Streek =

Dutch footballer (born 1993)

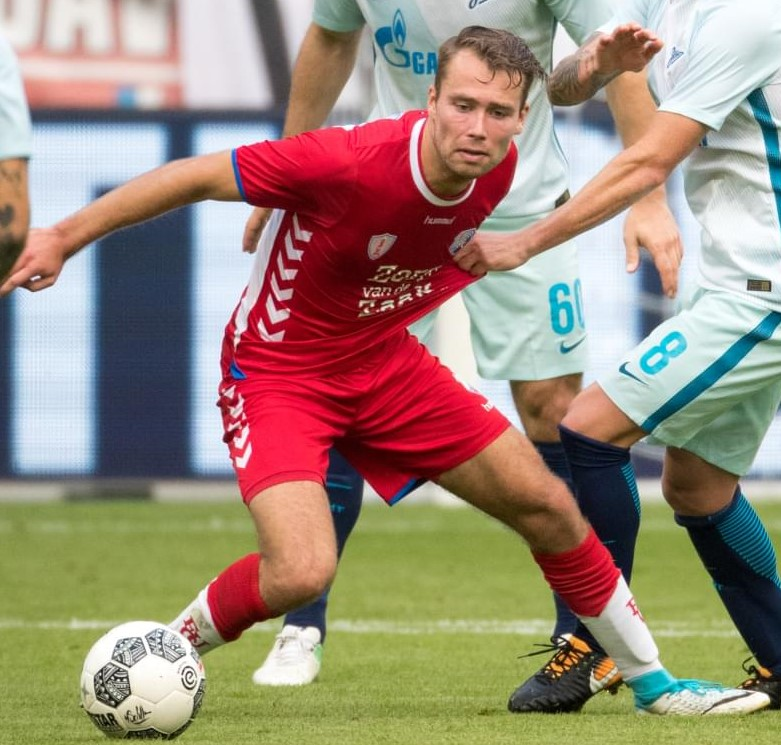
- Van de Streek in 2017

Personal information
- Full name: Alexander Gerard van de Streek
- Date of birth: 24 March 1993 (age 33)
- Place of birth: Barneveld, Netherlands
- Height: 1.80 m (5 ft 11 in)
- Position: Midfielder

Team information
- Current team: Antalyaspor
- Number: 22

Youth career
- –2011: SDV Barneveld
- 2011–2014: Vitesse

Senior career*
Years	Team	Apps	(Gls)
2013	→ Flora Tallinn (loan)	32	(7)
2014–2017	Cambuur	94	(33)
2017–2023	Utrecht	176	(46)
2023–	Antalyaspor	108	(14)
- * Club domestic league appearances and goals as of 09:31, 11 November 2026 (UTC)

Alexander Gerard "Sander" van de Streek (born 24 March 1993) is a Dutch professional footballer who plays as a midfielder for TFF 1. Lig club Antalyaspor. He formerly played for Vitesse, Flora Tallinn, Cambuur and Utrecht.

== Career ==
=== Vitesse ===
Born in Barneveld, Gelderland, Netherlands, Van de Streek began playing football for SDV Barneveld before joining Vitesse in 2011. In the preliminary rounds of the 2012–13 UEFA Europa League, Van de Streek was part of the first-team squad for the away leg against Lokomotiv Plovdiv but he missed the plane, taking part on the bench instead.

==== Flora Tallinn (loan) ====
In February 2013, Van de Streek was sent on loan to Flora Tallinn for the 2013 season – which ran until November – with Vitesse having the option of ending the loan earlier. He made his debut on 2 March 2013 in the season opener against JK Tallinna Kalev. On 9 March, he scored his first goals for Flora against Paide Linnameeskond – a hat-trick – in the 6–0 away win. On 4 July, Van de Streek made his European debut; in the Europa League qualifier against FK Kukësi he played the entire match. Van de Streek made 36 total appearances for Flora, scoring eight goals as the club won the 2012–13 Estonian Cup.

=== Cambuur ===
Without having made an official appearance for the Vitesse first team, Van de Streek moved to SC Cambuur on a free transfer on 1 May 2014, signing a two-year contract with an option for an additional year. He made his Eredivisie debut on 22 August 2014 against Heracles Almelo. He scored his first goal in his second match for Cambuur, on 14 September against FC Groningen. Only a few minutes after on as a substitute for Daniël de Ridder into the second half, he scored to secure his team's 3–0 win. On 15 February 2015, he scored his first brace in a 2–1 win over rivals SC Heerenveen. He finished the season with 33 appearances in all competitions, in which he scored seven goals.

In his second season at the club, he made 33 total appearances in which he scored four goals, as Cambuur suffered relegation to the second-tier Eerste Divisie.

During the 2016–17 season, his first in the second division, he distinguished himself by scoring a total of 22 goals, including two hat-tricks – both scored against TOP Oss.

=== Utrecht ===
On 2 June 2017, it was announced that Van de Streek would sign with FC Utrecht on a three-year deal. He made his debut on 13 July 2017 in a Europa League qualifier against Valletta, starting in the 0–0 draw. During the 2017–18 season he scored a total of 10 goals, including a brace away against Roda JC Kerkrade. His goals made him the second highest goalscorer in his team that season, only behind Zakaria Labyad.

At the end of the 2020–21 season, Van de Streek was voted Utrecht Player of the Season by the fans, winning the Di Tommaso Trophy.

=== Antalyaspor ===
On 18 August 2023, van de Streek signed a contract with Turkish club Antalyaspor for two seasons with an optional third.

== Honours ==
Flora Tallinn

- Estonian Cup: 2012–13
