= Justin Lonwijk =

Surinamese footballer (born 1999)

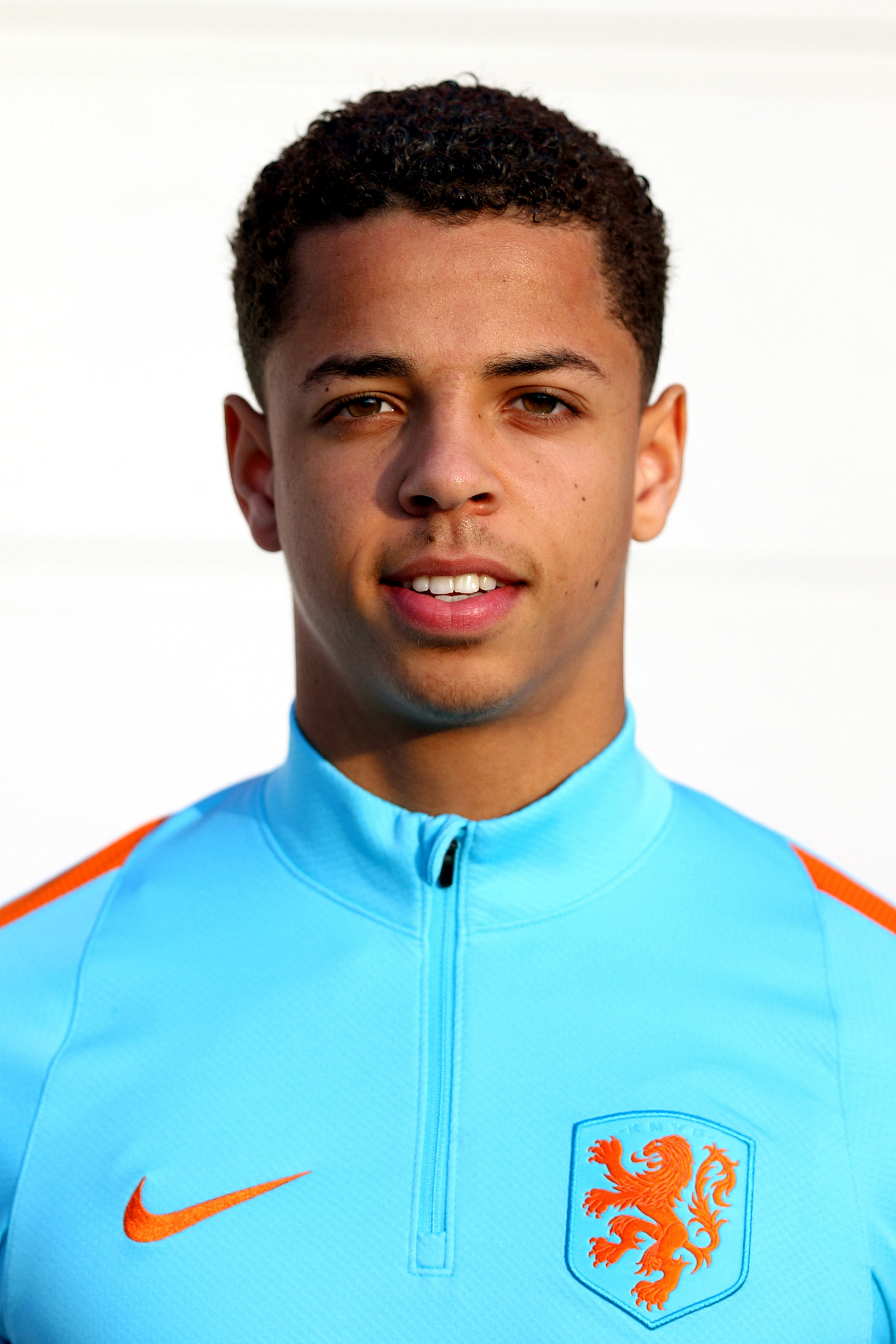
- Lonwijk with Netherlands U18 in 2017

Personal information
- Full name: Justin Antonius Lonwijk
- Date of birth: 21 December 1999 (age 26)
- Place of birth: Tilburg, Netherlands
- Height: 1.89 m (6 ft 2 in)
- Position: Midfielder

Team information
- Current team: Dynamo Kyiv
- Number: 21

Youth career
- –2010: Willem II
- 2010–2019: PSV

Senior career*
Years	Team	Apps	(Gls)
2017–2019	Jong PSV	33	(6)
2019–2021	Utrecht	1	(0)
2019–2021	Jong Utrecht	23	(4)
2021	→ Viborg FF (loan)	15	(3)
2021–2022	Viborg FF	38	(5)
2022–	Dynamo Kyiv	28	(2)
2023–2024	→ Anderlecht (loan)	3	(0)
2024	→ Fortuna Sittard (loan)	15	(3)
2024–2025	→ Viborg FF (loan)	20	(1)
2025–2026	→ Fortuna Sittard (loan)	15	(4)

International career^{‡}
2015	Netherlands U16	3	(0)
2016	Netherlands U17	6	(0)
2016–2017	Netherlands U18	6	(1)
2017–2018	Netherlands U19	9	(0)
2024–	Suriname	15	(5)
- * Club domestic league appearances and goals as of 18 October 2026 ‡ National team caps and goals as of 28 September 2026

Justin Antonius Lonwijk (born 21 December 1999) is a professional footballer who plays as a midfielder for Ukrainian club Dynamo Kyiv. Born in the Netherlands, he represents the Suriname national team.

== Club career ==
=== Jong PSV ===
He made his professional debut in the Eerste Divisie for Jong PSV on 13 January 2017 in a game against Den Bosch.

=== Utrecht ===
On 29 May 2019, he signed for Utrecht on a three-year contract, until 2022. Utrecht manager John van den Brom selected Lonwijk for the starting line-up in the two tiers against Zrinjski Mostar in the UEFA Europa League qualifiers. His Eredivisie debut followed on 4 August 2019, where he was a starter in the 4–2 away win over ADO Den Haag.

=== Viborg FF ===
On 25 January 2021, Lonwijk joined Danish 1st Division club Viborg FF on loan from Utrecht for the rest of the season with an option to buy. On 1 June 2021 was announced that they had exercised this purchase option. He signed a contract in Denmark until 2024.

=== Dynamo Kyiv ===
On 22 September 2022, Lonwijk signed a five-year contract with Ukrainian Premier League club Dynamo Kyiv. Viborg FF claimed he was sold for a club record transfer fee. Lonwijk signed with Dynamo Kyiv during the Russian invasion of Ukraine.

He made his debut for the club on 2 October 2022, replacing Volodymyr Shepelyev in the 82nd minute of a 1–0 away victory against Mynai. On 10 November, he scored his first goal for Dynamo by slotting home a Viktor Tsyhankov cross, thereby contributing to the team's 3–1 league win over Oleksandriya.

==== Anderlecht (loan) ====
On 25 July 2023, Belgian Pro League side Anderlecht announced the signing of Lonwijk on a season-long loan from Dynamo Kyiv, with an option to buy the player at the end of the season.

==== Fortuna Sittard (loan) ====
In January 2024, Lonwijk was recalled from his loan at Anderlecht, joining Eredivisie club Fortuna Sittard on loan for the remainder of the season.

==== Viborg FF (loan) ====
On 31 August 2024, Lonwijk returned to his former club Viborg FF on a season-long loan, with an option to buy. He played a league game less than 24 hours after the announcement, in a 2–2 draw against Sønderjyske. Viborg confirmed on Monday, 2 June 2025, that they would not exercise their option to purchase Lonwijk at the end of the season. He finished the season with 26 total appearances, scoring once.

==== Return to Fortuna Sittard ====
On 7 August 2025, Lonwijk returned to Fortuna Sittard on a new loan, with an option to buy.

== Personal life ==
Born in the Netherlands, Lonwijk is of Surinamese descent.

He is the oldest brother of Nigel Lonwijk, who plays for Premier League club Wolverhampton Wanderers, whilst his younger sister Jayden plays tennis.

In an interview Lonwijk also mentioned to be the cousin of FC Twente winger Virgil Misidjan.

== Career statistics ==
=== Club ===
As of match played 18 October 2026

Appearances and goals by club, season and competition
Club	Season	League			National cup (Note: Includes KNVB Cup, Danish Cup, Ukrainian Cup)		Europe		Other		Total	
Club	Season	Division	Apps	Goals	Apps	Goals	Apps	Goals	Apps	Goals	Apps	Goals
Jong PSV	2016–17	Eerste Divisie	8	2	—		—		—		8	2
Jong PSV	2017–18	Eerste Divisie	7	1	—		—		1 (Note: Appearance in Premier League Cup)	0	8	1
Jong PSV	2018–19	Eerste Divisie	18	3	—		—		1	0	19	3
Jong PSV	Total		33	6	—		—		2	0	35	6
Utrecht	2019–20	Eredivisie	1	0	0	0	2 (Note: Appearances in UEFA Europa League)	0	—		3	0
Jong Utrecht	2019–20	Eerste Divisie	11	3	—		—		—		11	3
Jong Utrecht	2020–21	Eerste Divisie	12	1	—		—		—		12	1
Jong Utrecht	Total		23	4	—		—		—		23	4
Viborg FF (loan)	2020–21	Danish 1st Division	15	3	—		—		—		15	3
Viborg FF	2021–22	Danish Superliga	29	3	1	0	—		—		30	3
Viborg FF	2022–23	Danish Superliga	9	2	0	0	—		—		9	2
Viborg FF	Total		38	5	1	0	—		—		39	5
Dynamo Kyiv	2022–23	Ukrainian Premier League	18	1	—		—		—		18	1
Dynamo Kyiv	2024–25	Ukrainian Premier League	2	0	—		4 (Note: Appearances in UEFA Champions League)	0	—		6	0
Dynamo Kyiv	2026–27	Ukrainian Premier League	8	1	0	0	5 (Note: Three appearances and one goal in UEFA Europa League, two appearances in UEFA Conference League)	1	—		13	2
Dynamo Kyiv	Total		28	2	0	0	9	1	—		37	3
Anderlecht (loan)	2023–24	Belgian Pro League	3	0	—		—		—		3	0
Fortuna Sittard (loan)	2023–24	Eredivisie	15	3	1	0	—		—		16	3
Viborg FF (loan)	2024–25	Danish Superliga	20	1	6	0	—		—		26	1
Fortuna Sittard (loan)	2025–26	Eredivisie	15	4	2	1	—		—		17	5
Career total			191	28	10	1	11	1	2	0	214	30

=== International ===
As of match played 28 September 2026

Appearances and goals by national team and year
National team	Year	Apps	Goals
Suriname	2024	7	2
Suriname	2025	6	1
Suriname	2026	2	2
Total		15	5

Scores and results list Suriname's goal tally first, score column indicates score after each Lonwijk goal.

List of international goals scored by Justin Lonwijk
No.	Date	Venue	Opponent	Score	Result	Competition
1	24 March 2024	André Kamperveen Stadion, Paramaribo, Suriname	Martinique	1–1	1–1	Friendly
2	5 June 2024	Dr. Ir. Franklin Essed Stadion, Paramaribo, Suriname	Saint Vincent and the Grenadines	3–1	4–1	2026 FIFA World Cup qualification
3	10 June 2025	Cuscatlán Stadium, San Salvador, El Salvador	El Salvador	1–0	1–1	2026 FIFA World Cup qualification
4	25 September 2026	Chelato Uclés National Stadium, Tegucigalpa, Honduras	Honduras	1–0	3–2	2026–27 CONCACAF Nations League A
5	28 September 2026	Dr. Ir. Franklin Essed Stadion, Paramaribo, Suriname	Martinique	1–0	2–1	2026–27 CONCACAF Nations League A

== Honours ==
Viborg

- Danish 1st Division: 2020–21
