= Sean Klaiber =

Footballer (born 1994)

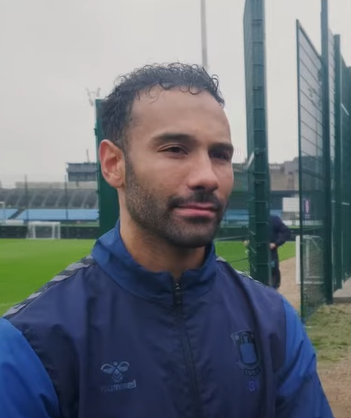
- Klaiber with Brøndby in 2023

Personal information
- Full name: Sean Desmond Klaiber
- Date of birth: 31 July 1994 (age 32)
- Place of birth: Nieuwegein, Netherlands
- Height: 1.81 m (5 ft 11 in)
- Position: Right-back

Team information
- Current team: VfL Bochum
- Number: 2

Youth career
- VVIJ
- 2005–2006: Ajax
- JSV Nieuwegein
- SV Geinoord
- 2007–2013: Utrecht

Senior career*
Years	Team	Apps	(Gls)
2013–2020	Utrecht	122	(8)
2015	→ Dordrecht (loan)	12	(2)
2016–2017	Jong Utrecht	7	(0)
2020–2022	Ajax	15	(0)
2022–2023	Utrecht	30	(1)
2023–2026	Brøndby	62	(4)
2026–	VfL Bochum	0	(0)

International career
2013	Netherlands U20	1	(0)
2015	Netherlands U21	4	(0)
2021	Suriname	3	(0)
- * Club domestic league appearances and goals as of 16:42, 22 May 2026 (UTC)

Sean Desmond Klaiber (born 31 July 1994) is a professional footballer who plays as a right-back for 2. Bundesliga club VfL Bochum. Born in the Netherlands, he represents the Suriname national team. He formerly played for Utrecht, Dordrecht and Ajax. He is a former Dutch youth international.

== Club career ==
=== Utrecht ===
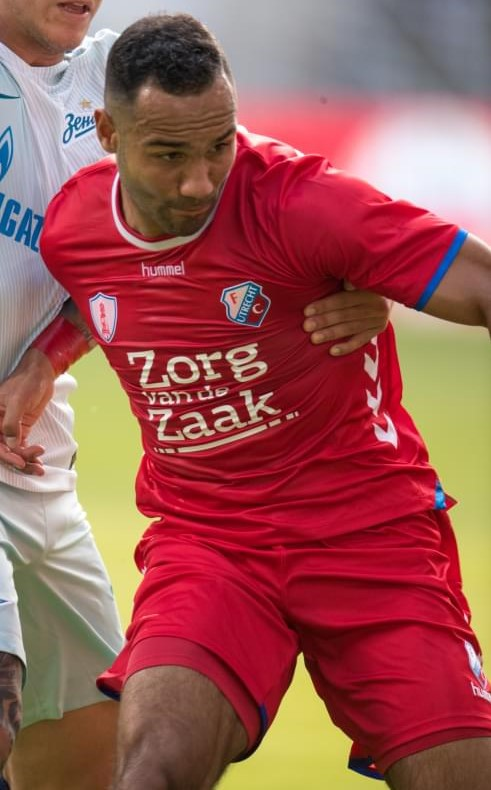
Klaiber with Utrecht in 2017.

Born in Nieuwegein, Klaiber played in the academies of VVIJ, Ajax, JSV Nieuwegein and SV Geinoord before joining the FC Utrecht youth academy in 2007. On 29 October 2013, Klaiber made his first appearance for the Utrecht first team in an official match. That day, the Domstedelingen played in Werkendam against Kozakken Boys in the KNVB Cup; a match which ended in a 1–2 away win after extra time in which Klaiber made an appearance as a 116th-minute substitute for Kai Heerings. He made his debut in the Eredivisie some months later, on 23 February 2014, as a starter in a 1–0 win over FC Groningen.

During the second half of the 2014–15 season, Klaiber was loaned out to FC Dordrecht who also competed in the Eredivisie. He made 12 appearances for the side in which he scored two goals, as they suffered relegation.

In the 2016–17 season, after returning from Dordrecht, Klaiber made seven appearances for the reserves, Jong FC Utrecht. The following season, he grew out to become a regular starter for the first team. He scored his first goal for Utrecht on 20 July 2017 in a UEFA Europa League qualifier against Maltese side Valletta, which ended in a 3–1 win.

=== Ajax ===
On 1 October 2020, Klaiber signed a three-year contract with Ajax, with an optional additional year. The move reunited him with his former Utrecht coach Erik ten Hag, as he was set to replace Sergiño Dest at right back, after the latter had joined FC Barcelona some days earlier.

On 18 October, he made his debut for Ajax as a substitute in the home match against sc Heerenveen. His first start for the club came on 24 October in a 13–0 win over VVV Venlo; an Eredivisie record. During the season, Klaiber was set to compete with Noussair Mazraoui for the right back position. On 27 October, Klaiber made his debut in the UEFA Champions League as a substitute during the away game against Italian club Atalanta.

=== Return to Utrecht ===
On 29 August 2022, Klaiber returned to Utrecht and signed a three-year contract. He made his return debut for the Domstedelingen on 2 September, replacing Hidde ter Avest in the 63rd minute and providing an assist 14 minutes later to Anastasios Douvikas' goal, helping the team to a 4–3 away victory against Fortuna Sittard. On 20 October, he scored his first return goal for the club in a KNVB Cup win against Sportlust '46. Three days later, he also scored for Utrecht in the Eredivisie, a deflected shot from distance giving Utrecht the 3–0 lead in an eventual 3–1 victory against Sparta Rotterdam.

=== Brøndby ===
On 1 September 2023, Danish Superliga club Brøndby signed Klaiber on a two-year contract, for a fee reported by B.T. to be around 8 million kr. He made his debut on 17 September in a 3–0 league win away to AGF, and scored his first goal on 26 November in a 3–3 away draw with Lyngby.

On 1 April 2024, Klaiber scored a stoppage-time winner in a 2–1 derby victory away to Copenhagen at Parken.

In March 2026, head coach Steve Cooper removed Klaiber and Benjamin Tahirović from the first-team squad, in what was reported as a response to the players' conduct. Klaiber remained out of the side for the rest of the season. In June 2026, the new head coach, Thomas Nørgaard, said that although Klaiber was training with the squad, the club intended for him to find another club; Klaiber, who had a year remaining on his contract, had by then made 78 appearances for Brøndby.

=== VfL Bochum ===
On 31 August 2026, Klaiber joined 2. Bundesliga club VfL Bochum, where he was brought in to cover for injured right-back Jean Manuel Mbom.

== International career ==
Born in the Netherlands, Klaiber is of Surinamese descent. Having played for the youth teams of the Netherlands, on 13 June 2021 it was announced that Klaiber had opted to represent Suriname internationally. On 25 June he was called up to represent the team at the 2021 CONCACAF Gold Cup.

On 12 July 2021, Klaiber made his debut in the group stage match against Jamaica. The match ended in a 2–0 loss, in Suriname's Gold Cup debut, which saw Klaiber being cautioned in the 25th minute.

== Career statistics ==
=== Club ===
As of matches played 15 February 2026

Appearances and goals by club, season and competition
Club	Season	League			National cup (Note: Includes KNVB Cup, Danish Cup)		Europe		Other		Total	
Club	Season	Division	Apps	Goals	Apps	Goals	Apps	Goals	Apps	Goals	Apps	Goals
Utrecht	2013–14	Eredivisie	2	0	1	0	0	0	—		3	0
Utrecht	2014–15	Eredivisie	1	0	0	0	—		—		1	0
Utrecht	2015–16	Eredivisie	17	0	2	0	—		—		19	0
Utrecht	2016–17	Eredivisie	14	0	1	0	—		4 (Note: Appearances in Eredivisie Europa League play-offs)	0	19	0
Utrecht	2017–18	Eredivisie	36	1	1	0	6 (Note: Appearances in UEFA Europa League)	1	3	0	46	2
Utrecht	2018–19	Eredivisie	37	2	2	0	—		4	0	43	2
Utrecht	2019–20	Eredivisie	24	4	5	0	2	0	—		31	4
Utrecht	2020–21	Eredivisie	2	1	0	0	—		—		2	1
Utrecht	Total		133	8	12	0	8	1	11	0	164	9
Dordrecht (loan)	2014–15	Eredivisie	12	2	—		—		—		12	2
Jong Utrecht	2016–17	Eerste Divisie	7	0	—		—		—		7	0
Ajax	2020–21	Eredivisie	15	0	1	0	6 (Note: Three appearances in UEFA Champions League, three appearances in UEFA Europa League)	0	—		22	0
Utrecht	2022–23	Eredivisie	30	1	3	1	—		2	0	35	2
Utrecht	2023–24	Eredivisie	2	0	—		—		—		2	0
Utrecht	Total		32	1	3	1	—		2	0	37	2
Brøndby	2023–24	Danish Superliga	23	4	3	0	—		—		26	4
Brøndby	2024–25	Danish Superliga	26	0	4	0	3 (Note: Appearances in UEFA Conference League)	0	—		33	0
Brøndby	2025–26	Danish Superliga	13	0	0	0	6	0	0	0	19	0
Brøndby	Total		62	4	7	0	9	0	0	0	78	4
VfL Bochum	2026–27	2. Bundesliga	0	0	0	0	—		—		0	0
Career total			261	15	23	1	23	1	13	0	320	17

=== International ===
As of 21 July 2021

Appearances and goals by national team and year
National team	Year	Apps	Goals
Suriname	2021	3	0
Total		3	0

== Honours ==
Ajax

- Eredivisie: 2020–21, 2021–22
- KNVB Cup: 2020–21

Individual

- Superliga Team of the Month: September 2023
