= Yassin Nasser =

Dutch footballer

Personal information
- Date of birth: 25 February 2000 (age 26)
- Place of birth: Veghel, Netherlands
- Height: 1.78 m (5 ft 10 in)
- Position: Winger

Team information
- Current team: Blauw Geel '38
- Number: 22

Youth career
- 2009–2011: PSV
- –2018: Lierse
- 2018–2021: Utrecht

Senior career*
Years	Team	Apps	(Gls)
2020–2021	Jong Utrecht	6	(0)
2022	FK Skopje	8	(0)
2022–	Blauw Geel '38	41	(4)
- * Club domestic league appearances and goals as of 15 October 2024

Yassin Nasser (born 25 February 2000) is a Dutch footballer who plays as a winger for Derde Divisie club Blauw Geel '38.

== Early life ==
Born in Veghel, Nasser grew up playing football from the age of five with his local club. Simons is of Moroccan descent through his father.

== Club career ==
=== Early career ===
Nasser joined PSV Eindhoven in 2009 from his local club Blauw Geel which is located in his birthplace Veghel, Netherlands.
