= Willem Janssen (footballer, born 1986) =

Dutch footballer

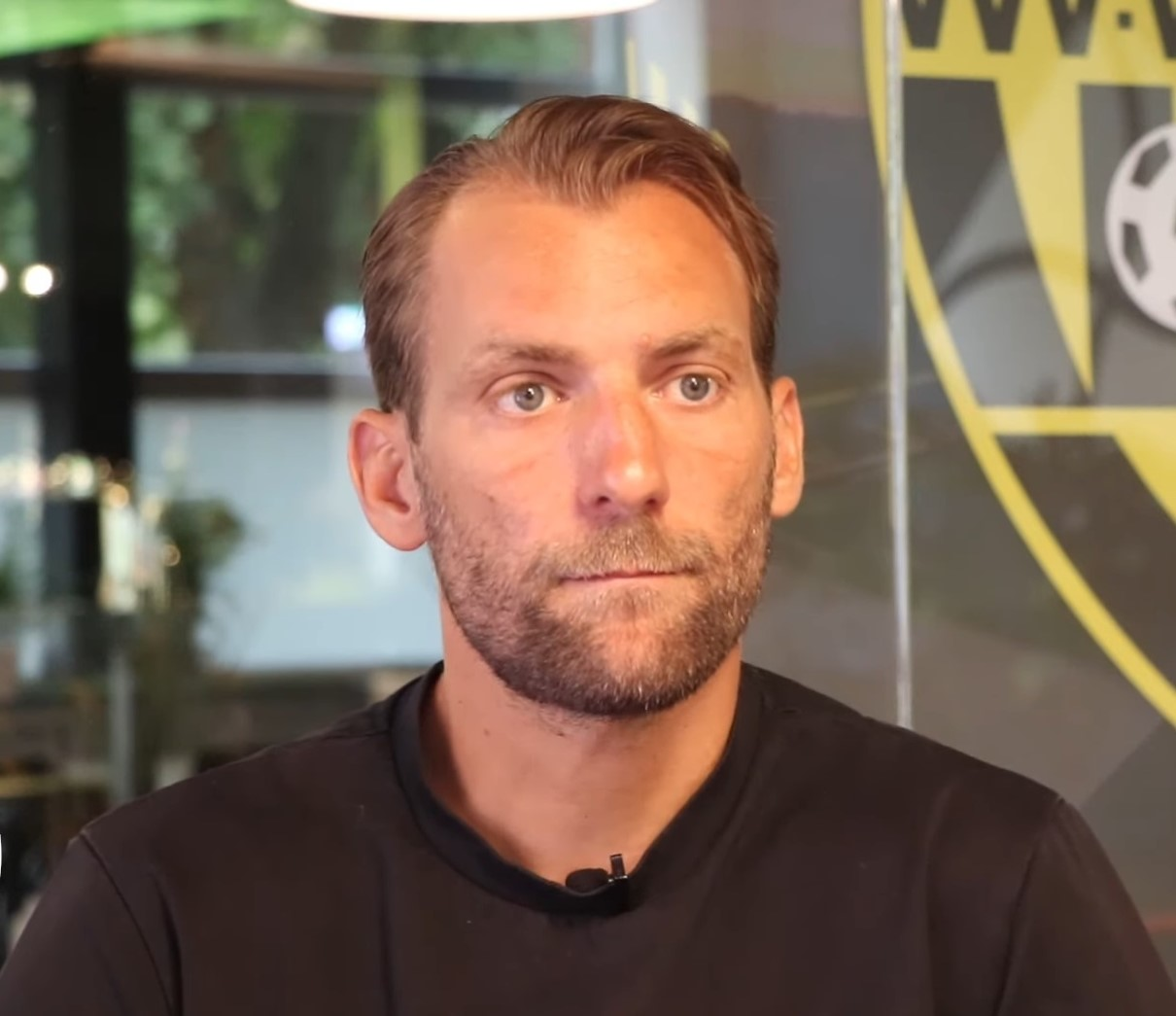
- Janssen in 2023

Personal information
- Date of birth: 4 July 1986 (age 40)
- Place of birth: Nijmegen, Netherlands
- Height: 1.86 m (6 ft 1 in)
- Position: Centre-back

Senior career*
Years	Team	Apps	(Gls)
2004–2007	VVV-Venlo	94	(16)
2007–2011	Roda JC	129	(22)
2011–2014	Twente	61	(8)
2013–2014	→ Utrecht (loan)	5	(1)
2014–2022	Utrecht	212	(23)

International career
2008	Netherlands U21	2	(0)
- * Club domestic league appearances and goals

Willem Janssen (born 4 July 1986) is a Dutch professional football official and a former player who played as a central defender. He is the technical director of VVV-Venlo.

== Club career ==
Born in Nijmegen, Janssen made his professional debut for VVV-Venlo in the 2004–05 season, before signing for Roda JC in 2007.

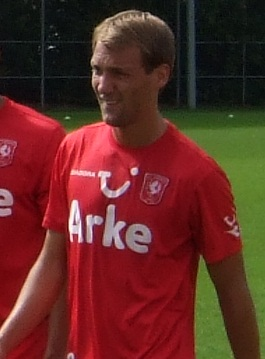
Janssen with FC Twente in 2011

In November 2010, it was announced that Janssen would move to FC Twente at the end of the 2010–11 season, on a free transfer.

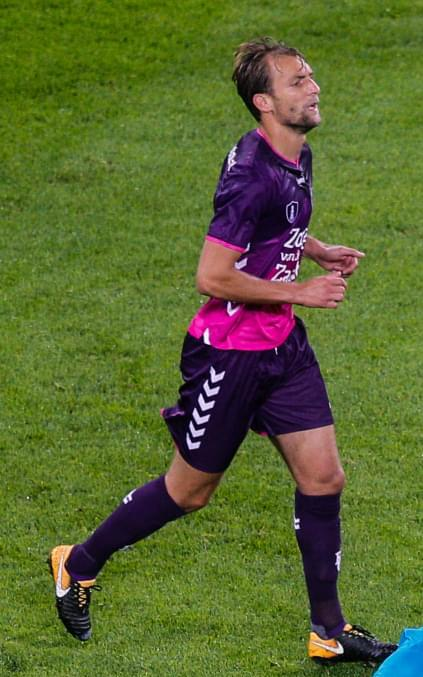
Janssen with Utrecht in 2017

In August 2013, Janssen was sent on loan at FC Utrecht for the remainder of the season.

== Post-playing career ==
In July 2022, Janssen joined VVV-Venlo as a technical director.

== Honours ==
Twente

- Johan Cruijff Schaal: 2011

Individual

- Eredivisie Team of the Month: August 2021
