= Adrián Dalmau =

Spanish footballer (born 1994)

Personal information
- Full name: Adrián Dalmau Vaquer
- Date of birth: 23 March 1994 (age 32)
- Place of birth: Palma, Spain
- Height: 1.82 m (6 ft 0 in)
- Position: Forward

Team information
- Current team: PSIM Yogyakarta
- Number: 20

Youth career
- San Francisco
- 2011–2012: Real Madrid
- 2012–2013: Rayo Vallecano

Senior career*
Years	Team	Apps	(Gls)
2012–2014	Rayo Vallecano B	10	(1)
2013–2014	→ Zamora (loan)	28	(2)
2014–2015	Racing Ferrol	35	(8)
2015–2017	Espanyol B	25	(12)
2016	→ Numancia (loan)	9	(0)
2016–2017	→ Mallorca (loan)	7	(0)
2017–2018	Villarreal B	34	(10)
2018–2019	Heracles	33	(19)
2019–2021	Utrecht	36	(8)
2022	Sparta Rotterdam	12	(2)
2022–2023	Alcorcón	33	(8)
2023–2025	Korona Kielce	57	(15)
2025–2026	Piast Gliwice	16	(2)
2026–	PSIM Yogyakarta	1	(0)
- * Club domestic league appearances and goals as of 22:00, 5 September 2026 (UTC)

Adrián Dalmau Vaquer (born 23 March 1994) is a Spanish professional footballer who plays as a forward for Super League club PSIM Yogyakarta.

== Club career ==
Born in Palma de Mallorca, Balearic Islands, Dalmau joined Real Madrid's youth setup in 2011 after starting out at CD San Francisco. The following year, he moved to neighbouring Rayo Vallecano, making his debut with the reserves on 25 November 2012 by coming on as a second-half substitute in a 0–2 Segunda División B home loss against Ourense.

Dalmau was loaned to Zamora also of the third division on 2 September 2013. On 8 July of the following year, he signed a one-year deal at Racing de Ferrol in the same tier after terminating his contract with Rayo.

A backup to Joselu, Dalmau still contributed eight goals as his team missed out on promotion in the play-offs. On 19 June 2015, he moved to another reserve team, Espanyol B still in division three.

On 29 February 2016, after scoring 12 times in 25 matches, Dalmau was loaned to Numancia until June. He made his Segunda División debut on 6 March, replacing Jon Gaztañaga in the 1–0 away defeat against Ponferradina.

Dalmau was loaned to Mallorca in a season-long deal, on 12 August 2016. The following 15 July, after suffering second-division relegation, he cut ties with Espanyol and joined Villarreal B.

In June 2018, Dalmau moved abroad and agreed to a three-year contract at Dutch Eredivisie side Heracles with the option of a fourth. With 19 goals, he finished third in the scoring charts in his only season; this included four goals on 16 February 2019 in a 6–0 home win over Fortuna Sittard, and a hat-trick on the last day in a 5–4 loss to Excelsior also at the Polman Stadion.

In July 2019, after his club rejected an offer from Maccabi Tel Aviv, Dalmau signed a three-year deal with Utrecht of the same league for an undisclosed fee. He struggled heavily with injuries in his debut campaign, appearing in only eight competitive games.

Dalmau joined Sparta Rotterdam on 24 December 2021, on a five-month contract to be made effective the following January. On 11 August 2022, he returned to Spain with Alcorcón of the Primera Federación.

On 8 July 2023, Dalmau signed a two-year deal with Polish Ekstraklasa side Korona Kielce. After it expired, he joined Piast Gliwice of the same league on a two-year contract.

On 28 July 2026, Dalmau moved to Indonesian Super League club PSIM Yogyakarta.

== Honours ==
Korona Kielce II

- IV liga Świętokrzyskie: 2023–24
