= Mark van der Maarel =

Dutch footballer (born 1989)

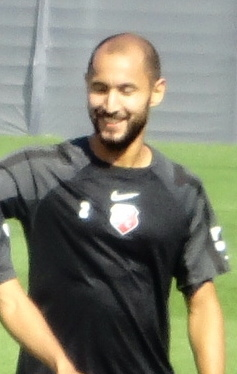
- van der Maarel with Utrecht in 2022

Personal information
- Date of birth: 12 August 1989 (age 37)
- Place of birth: Arnhem, Netherlands
- Height: 1.77 m (5 ft 10 in)
- Position: Defender

Youth career
- Argon
- 2006–2008: Haarlem
- 2008–2009: Utrecht

Senior career*
Years	Team	Apps	(Gls)
2009–2024	Utrecht	363	(12)
2016	Jong Utrecht	1	(0)
- * Club domestic league appearances and goals

Mark van der Maarel (born 12 August 1989) is a Dutch former professional footballer who played his entire professional career for FC Utrecht as a right-back. Born in the Netherlands, he is of Indonesian descent.

== Club career ==
Born in Arnhem, Van der Maarel played for Argon in his youth, and after a spell in the Haarlem youth, he joined FC Utrecht in May 2008.

He made his debut on 22 August 2009 in a friendly against non-league side USV Elinkwijk. His first league match was on 20 September at ADO Den Haag, where he replaced the injured Sander Keller after 67 minutes. Due to injuries to regular right back and team captain Tim Cornelisse, he kept his place in the first team and made an impressive contribution to the best start to a season ever for Utrecht. In the 1–0 win against champions AZ he was voted Man of the Match.

In the 2017–18 season, Van der Maarel was named FC Utrecht Player of the Year by the club's supporters and thereby won the David di Tommaso Trophy. The fans rewarded him for his perseverance and the fact that during the season he broke the iconic boundary of 200 Eredivisie matches for Utrecht. In addition, the defender managed to score four goals.

On 22 February 2021, Van der Maarel signed a two-year contract extension, keeping him part of Utrecht until 2023. At that point, he had made 307 official appearances for the club, making him sixth on the all-time list of most games played for Utrecht.

On 15 March 2024, Van der Maarel announced his retirement at the end of the 2023–24 season.

== International career ==
On 5 October 2011, Van der Maarel was called up for Netherlands U21, for the European U21 Championship group 4 qualifiers at Finland and Poland. Here he also benefited from injury problems by his replacing Feyenoord defender Kelvin Leerdam.
