= 2020–21 FC Emmen season =

FC Emmen
2020–21 season
- Chairman: Ronald Lubbers
- Manager: Dick Lukkien
- Stadium: De Oude Meerdijk
- Eredivisie: 16th (relegated)
- KNVB Cup: Round of 16
- Top goalscorer: League: Michael de Leeuw (13); All: Michael de Leeuw (15)
Home colours	Away colours

The 2020–21 season was FC Emmen's 96th season in existence and the club's third consecutive season in the top flight of Dutch football. In addition to the domestic league, FC Emmen participated in this season's edition of the KNVB Cup. The season covered the period from 1 July 2020 to 30 June 2021.

== Players ==
=== First-team squad ===
Note: Flags indicate national team as defined under FIFA eligibility rules; some limited exceptions apply. Players may hold more than one non-FIFA nationality.

No.	Pos.	Nation	Player
1	GK	GER	Felix Wiedwald
3	DF	NED	Keziah Veendorp
4	DF	NED	Nick Bakker
5	DF	PER	Miguel Araujo
7	MF	SWE	Simon Tibbling
8	MF	NED	Michael de Leeuw (captain)
9	FW	CRO	Marko Kolar
10	MF	PER	Sergio Peña
11	FW	DEN	Nikolai Laursen
14	DF	NED	Ferhat Görgülü
15	MF	PER	Didier La Torre
16	GK	NED	Robin Jalving
17	FW	NED	Paul Gladon
18	DF	CZE	Denis Granečný (on loan from Baník Ostrava)
20	MF	NED	Jari Vlak
21	MF	NED	Hilal Ben Moussa

No.	Pos.	Nation	Player
22	DF	NED	Caner Cavlan
23	DF	NED	Glenn Bijl
24	MF	FRA	Lucas Bernadou
25	FW	BEL	Sekou Sidibe
26	GK	NED	Dennis Telgenkamp
28	GK	NED	Michael Verrips (on loan from Sheffield United)
29	DF	SUI	Elias Frei
30	DF	USA	Desevio Payne
31	MF	TUR	Kerim Frei
32	MF	NED	Robbert de Vos
34	DF	NED	Ricardo van Rhijn
35	DF	PER	Jean-Pierre Rhyner (on loan from Cádiz)
77	MF	SRB	Luka Adžić (on loan from Anderlecht)
93	GK	NED	Stefan van der Lei
—	MF	NED	Luciano Carty

== Pre-season and friendlies ==
Win Draw Loss

7 August 2020 Friendly	FC Emmen (Netherlands)	2–5	(Netherlands) Cambuur	Emmen, Netherlands
18:45 CEST (UTC+2)	Laursen 53', 81'	Report	Mühren 5', 32'; Korte 69', 79'; Dijkstra 75'	Stadium: De Oude Meerdijk

11 August 2020 Friendly	FC Emmen (Netherlands)	1–4	(Netherlands) FC Groningen	Emmen, Netherlands
18:45 CEST (UTC+2)	Bijl 43'	Report	Hrustic 38'; El Karbachi 60', 83'; Šabani 80' (o.g.)	Stadium: De Oude Meerdijk

15 August 2020 Friendly	FC Emmen (Netherlands)	1–0	(Netherlands) Telstar	Emmen, Netherlands
14:00 CEST (UTC+2)	De Leeuw 4'	Report		Stadium: De Oude Meerdijk

19 August 2020 Friendly	FC Emmen (Netherlands)	0–2	(Netherlands) Heracles Almelo	Emmen, Netherlands
14:30 CEST (UTC+2)		Report	Knoester 30'; Burgzorg 32'	Stadium: De Oude Meerdijk; Referee: Serdar Gözübüyük

24 August 2020 Friendly	FC Emmen (Netherlands)	0–1	(Netherlands) PEC Zwolle	Emmen, Netherlands
18:45 CEST (UTC+2)		Report	Ghoochannejhad 76'	Stadium: De Oude Meerdijk; Attendance: 1,000; Referee: Rob Dieperink

29 August 2020 Friendly	Rot-Weiss Essen (Germany)	1–0	(Netherlands) FC Emmen	Herzlake, Germany
14:30 CEST (UTC+2)	Endres 51'	Report		Stadium: Hasetal Stadion

5 September 2020 Friendly	FC Twente (Netherlands)	1–1	(Netherlands) FC Emmen	Enschede, Netherlands
19:00 CEST (UTC+2)	Černý 57'	Report	Kolar 26'	Stadium: De Grolsch Veste; Attendance: 3,600; Referee: Jeroen Manschot

== Competitions ==
=== Overview ===
Competition	First match	Last match	Starting round	Final position	Record							
Competition	First match	Last match	Starting round	Final position	Pld	W	D	L	GF	GA	GD	Win %
Eredivisie	13 September 2020	16 May 2021	Matchday 1	16th	34	7	9	18	40	68	−28	20.59
Eredivisie Play-offs	20 May 2021		Semi-finals	Semi-finals	1	0	1	0	1	1	+0	0.00
KNVB Cup	28 October 2020	20 January 2021	First round	Round of 16	3	2	0	1	5	3	+2	66.67
Total					38	9	10	19	46	72	−26	23.68

Source: Soccerway

=== Eredivisie ===
==== League table ====
Pos	Team	Pld	W	D	L	GF	GA	GD	Pts	Qualification or relegation
14	Willem II	34	8	7	19	40	68	−28	31	
15	RKC Waalwijk	34	7	9	18	33	55	−22	30	
16	Emmen (R)	34	7	9	18	40	68	−28	30	Qualification for the Relegation play-offs (Note: Seven teams, one from the Eredivisie and six from the Eerste Divisie, play for one spot in the 2021–22 Eredivisie. The remaining six teams play in the 2021–22 Eerste Divisie.)
17	VVV-Venlo (R)	34	6	5	23	43	91	−48	23	Relegation to Eerste Divisie
18	ADO Den Haag (R)	34	4	10	20	29	76	−47	22	Relegation to Eerste Divisie

Source: Eredivisie, Soccerway
Rules for classification: Season in progress: 1) Most points won; 2) Less points lost; 3) Goal difference; 4) Goals scored; 5) Alphabetical order; End of season: 1) Points; 2) Goal difference; 3) Goals scored; 4) Head-to-head points; 5) Head-to-head goal difference; 6) Head-to-head away goals scored; 7) Play-off if relevant for deciding champion, relegation or participating in a European league, otherwise by draw. 8) Penalty shoot-out (only after a play-off)
(R) Relegated

==== Results summary ====
Overall								Home						Away					
Pld	W	D	L	GF	GA	GD	Pts	W	D	L	GF	GA	GD	W	D	L	GF	GA	GD
34	7	9	18	40	68	−28	30	4	4	9	26	41	−15	3	5	9	14	27	−13

Source: Eredivisie

==== Results by round ====
Round	1	2	3	4	5	6	7	8	9	10	11	12	13	14	15	16	17	18	19	20	21	22	23	24	25	26	27	28	29	30	31	32	33	34
Ground	H	A	H	A	H	A	H	A	A	H	A	H	A	H	H	A	H	A	H	A	H	A	H	A	H	A	A	H	A	H	A	H	H	A
Result	L	L	D	D	D	L	L	L	L	L	L	D	D	L	L	L	L	D	L	L	L	L	W	W	D	D	D	W	W	W	L	L	W	W
Position	13	14	14	15	15	16	17	17	17	18	18	18	18	18	18	18	18	18	18	18	18	18	18	18	18	18	18	17	17	16	16	16	16	16

Source: Eredivisie
A = Away; H = Home; W = Win; D = Draw; L = Loss

==== Matches ====
The league fixtures were announced on 24 July 2020.

13 September 2020 1	FC Emmen	3–5	VVV-Venlo	Emmen
12:15 CEST (UTC+2)	De Vos 4'; Kolar 49', (yellow card) 86'; Chacón (yellow card) 64'; Laursen 76'	Report	Hupperts (yellow card) 20'; Post (yellow card) 39'; Giakoumakis 50', 65' (pen.), 72'; Kum (yellow card) 67'; Cavlan 90' (o.g.); Arias 90+4'	Stadium: De Oude Meerdijk; Attendance: 2,400; Referee: Siemen Mulder

19 September 2020 2	PSV	2–1	FC Emmen	Eindhoven
20:00 CEST (UTC+2)	Madueke 21'; Romero 90+4'	Report	Cavlan (yellow card) 42'; Mvogo 83' (o.g.); Laursen (yellow card) 84'; Jansen (yellow card) 87'	Stadium: Philips Stadion; Attendance: 8,000; Referee: Martin van den Kerkhof

27 September 2020 3	FC Emmen	1–1	Willem II	Emmen
16:45 CEST (UTC+2)	De Leeuw 5'; Bijl (yellow card) 19', (red card) 57'	Report	Ndayishimiye 13'; Holmén (yellow card) 90+2'	Stadium: De Oude Meerdijk; Attendance: 2,312; Referee: Edwin van de Graaf

3 October 2020 4	FC Twente	1–1	FC Emmen	Enschede
21:00 CEST (UTC+2)	Černý (yellow card) 45+1', (goal) 48'	Report	Bakker (yellow card) 20'; De Leeuw 65'	Stadium: De Grolsch Veste; Attendance: 0 Referee: Siemen Mulder

18 October 2020 5	FC Emmen	2–2	Fortuna Sittard	Emmen
14:30 CEST (UTC+2)	Laursen 51'; De Leeuw 60'; Tibbling (yellow card) 73'; Peña (yellow card) 85'	Report	Polter 18'; Semedo 23'; Seuntjens (yellow card) 79'	Stadium: De Oude Meerdijk; Attendance: 0 Referee: Serdar Gözübüyük

24 October 2020 6	SC Heerenveen	4–0	FC Emmen	Heerenveen
21:00 CEST (UTC+2)	Van Hecke (yellow card) 3'; H. Veerman 26', 74'; Nygren 29'; Kongolo 71'; Dewaele (yellow card) 84'	Report	Tibbling (yellow card) 47' (yellow-red card) 52'; De Leeuw (yellow card) 52'; Laursen (red card) 77'	Stadium: Abe Lenstra Stadion; Attendance: 0 Referee: Sander van der Eijk

1 November 2020 7	FC Emmen	2–3	Feyenoord	Emmen
14:30 CET (UTC+1)	Jansen 5' (pen.); De Leeuw 43'	Report	Diemers 40' (pen.); Toornstra 45'; Bannis 90+4'	Stadium: De Oude Meerdijk; Attendance: 0 Referee: Björn Kuipers

8 November 2020 8	Vitesse	3–1	FC Emmen	Arnhem
14:30 CET (UTC+1)	Tannane 9', 26'; Bazoer (red card) 29'; Openda 44'	Report	Wiedwald (yellow card) 8'; Tibbling (yellow card) 20'; Veendorp (yellow card) 43'; De Leeuw 58'; Carty (yellow card) 79'; Van Rhijn (yellow card) 88'	Stadium: GelreDome; Attendance: 0 Referee: Jeroen Manschot

21 November 2020 9	AZ	1–0	FC Emmen	Alkmaar
20:00 CET (UTC+1)	Martins Indi 11'; Koopmeiners (yellow card) 86'; Svensson (yellow card) 88'	Report	Bernadou (red card) 60'; Cavlan (yellow card) 62'	Stadium: AFAS Stadion; Attendance: 0 Referee: Marc Nagtegaal

28 November 2020 10	FC Emmen	0–5	Ajax	Emmen
18:45 CET (UTC+1)		Report	Klaassen 20'; Labyad 29'; Traoré 38'; Ekkelenkamp 69'; Klaiber (yellow card) 79'; Promes 82'	Stadium: De Oude Meerdijk; Attendance: 0 Referee: Serdar Gözübüyük

4 December 2020 11	Sparta Rotterdam	2–1	FC Emmen	Rotterdam
20:00 CET (UTC+1)	Duarte 22'; Harroui 58'; Gravenberch (yellow card) 80'	Report	Peña (yellow card) 5'; Jansen (yellow card) 6'; Araujo 52'; Ben Moussa (yellow card) 79'	Stadium: Het Kasteel; Attendance: 0 Referee: Jochem Kamphuis

12 December 2020 12	FC Emmen	1–1	ADO Den Haag	Emmen
18:45 CET (UTC+1)	De Leeuw (yellow card) 55'; Araujo 72'	Report	Besuijen 6'; De Boer (yellow card) 42'	Stadium: De Oude Meerdijk; Attendance: 0 Referee: Jeroen Manschot

18 December 2020 13	PEC Zwolle	0–0	FC Emmen	Zwolle
20:00 CET (UTC+1)		Report		Stadium: MAC³PARK Stadion; Attendance: 0 Referee: Björn Kuipers

22 December 2020 14	FC Emmen	2–3	FC Utrecht	Emmen
18:45 CET (UTC+1)	Araujo 27'; Bernadou 43'	Report	Elia 22'; Van Overeem 60'; Dalmau 75'	Stadium: De Oude Meerdijk; Attendance: 0 Referee: Christiaan Bax

9 January 2021 15	FC Emmen	1–4	FC Twente	Emmen
18:45 CET (UTC+1)	Araujo 59'	Report	Černý 16', 63'; Menig 33'; Bosch 42', (yellow card) 66'	Stadium: De Oude Meerdijk; Attendance: 0 Referee: Allard Lindhout

12 January 2021 16	Heracles Almelo	4–0	FC Emmen	Almelo
21:00 CET (UTC+1)	Bakış 26', 44', 64'; Vloet 87'	Report	Araujo (yellow card) 28'; Bernadou (yellow card) 45+1'	Stadium: Erve Asito; Attendance: 0 Referee: Rob Dieperink

16 January 2021 17	FC Emmen	1–4	Vitesse	Emmen
16:30 CET (UTC+1)	De Leeuw 58'; Veendorp (yellow card) 79'; Bakker (yellow card) 85'; Vlak (yellow card) 87'	Report	Buitink 2'; Tannane 9'; Broja 49'; Bazoer (yellow card) 57'; Bruns (yellow card) 64'; Wittek (yellow card) 72'; Vroegh 90+3'	Stadium: De Oude Meerdijk; Attendance: 0 Referee: Jochem Kamphuis

23 January 2021 18	ADO Den Haag	0–0	FC Emmen	The Hague
16:30 CET (UTC+1)	Kishna (yellow card) 86'; Kramer (yellow card) 90+2'	Report		Stadium: Cars Jeans Stadion; Attendance: 0 Referee: Bas Nijhuis

26 January 2021 19	FC Emmen	0–2	PSV	Emmen
20:00 CET (UTC+1)		Report	Mauro Júnior 81'; Zahavi 88'	Stadium: De Oude Meerdijk; Attendance: 0 Referee: Jeroen Manschot

31 January 2021 20	Willem II	2–0	FC Emmen	Tilburg
14:30 CET (UTC+1)	Nunnely 38'; Wriedt 47'	Report	Bijl (yellow card) 90'	Stadium: Koning Willem II Stadion; Attendance: 0 Referee: Björn Kuipers

6 February 2021 21	FC Emmen	0–1	AZ	Emmen
20:00 CET (UTC+1)		Report	Chatzidiakos (yellow card) 42'; Sugawara 71'	Stadium: De Oude Meerdijk; Attendance: 0 Referee: Pol van Boekel

12 February 2021 22	RKC Waalwijk	1–0	FC Emmen	Waalwijk
18:45 CET (UTC+1)	Touba 90'	Report		Stadium: Mandemakers Stadion; Attendance: 0 Referee: Edwin van de Graaf

20 February 2021 23	FC Emmen	3–2	PEC Zwolle	Emmen
18:45 CET (UTC+1)	Bijl (yellow card) 26'; Adžić 36'; De Leeuw 45'; Vlak 70'; Cavlan (yellow card) 87'	Report	Lam (yellow card) 23'; Van Polen 40'; Nakayama 88'	Stadium: De Oude Meerdijk; Attendance: 0 Referee: Serdar Gözübüyük

27 February 2021 24	FC Utrecht	0–1	FC Emmen	Utrecht
16:30 CET (UTC+1)	Boussaid (yellow card) 18'; Maher (yellow card) 36'; Van de Streek (yellow card) 54'; Van der Maarel (yellow card) 83'; Kerk (yellow card) 90+2'	Report	Peña 14'; Frei (yellow card) 64'; De Leeuw (yellow card) 86'; Araujo (yellow card) 89'; Veendorp (yellow card) 90+3'	Stadium: Stadion Galgenwaard; Attendance: 0 Referee: Christiaan Bax

5 March 2021 25	FC Emmen	1–1	Sparta Rotterdam	Emmen
20:00 CET (UTC+1)	Verrips (yellow card) 78'; Laursen (yellow card) 90+4'; De Leeuw 90+6' (pen.)	Report	Duarte 43'; Kharchouch (yellow card) 90+3'	Stadium: De Oude Meerdijk; Attendance: 0 Referee: Danny Makkelie

13 March 2021 26	FC Groningen	1–1	FC Emmen	Groningen
20:00 CET (UTC+1)	Padt (yellow card) 7'; Da Cruz 60'	Report	Peña (yellow card) 33'; Bijl 38'	Stadium: Euroborg; Attendance: 0 Referee: Allard Lindhout

20 March 2021 27	Feyenoord	1–1	FC Emmen	Rotterdam
20:00 CET (UTC+1)	Sinisterra (yellow card) 24'; Kökçü 37'	Report	Bakker (yellow card) 38'; De Leeuw 79' (pen.)	Stadium: De Kuip; Attendance: 0 Referee: Kevin Blom

4 April 2021 28	FC Emmen	3–1	RKC Waalwijk	Emmen
16:45 CEST (UTC+2)	Bakker 10'; Adžić 17'; Peña (penalty missed) 32', 32'; Ben Moussa (yellow card) 43'	Report	Anita (yellow card) 30'; Van der Venne (yellow card) 42'; Ngonge 90+2'	Stadium: De Oude Meerdijk; Attendance: 0 Referee: Danny Makkelie

10 April 2021 29	Fortuna Sittard	1–3	FC Emmen	Sittard
20:00 CEST (UTC+2)	Janssen (red card) 50'; Angha (yellow card) 54'; Van den Buijs (yellow card) 73'; Emmanouilidis 85'	Report	Peña 53' (pen.); Bijl 89' (pen.); Gladon 90+7'	Stadium: Fortuna Sittard Stadion; Attendance: 0 Referee: Joey Kooij

25 April 2021 30	FC Emmen	3–1	Heracles Almelo	Emmen
12:15 CEST (UTC+2)	De Leeuw 58' (pen.), 89', 90+1'; Verrips (yellow card) 82'	Report	De la Torre (yellow card) 36'; Vloet 82' (pen.)	Stadium: De Oude Meerdijk; Attendance: 987; Referee: Jochem Kamphuis

2 May 2021 31	Ajax	4–0	FC Emmen	Amsterdam
14:30 CEST (UTC+2)	Timber 10'; Álvarez (yellow card) 57'; Haller 61'; Tagliafico (yellow card) 65'; Rensch 66'; Klaassen 74'	Report	Cavlan (yellow card) 14'; Vlak (yellow card) 61'	Stadium: Johan Cruyff Arena; Attendance: 0 Referee: Kevin Blom

9 May 2021 32	FC Emmen	0–4	FC Groningen	Emmen
12:15 CEST (UTC+2)	Bijl (yellow card) 27'; Vlak (yellow card) 53'	Report	Van Hintum 28', (yellow card) 55'; Da Cruz 52', 62'; Lundqvist (yellow card) 55'; Abraham 81'	Stadium: De Oude Meerdijk; Attendance: 0 Referee: Serdar Gözübüyük

13 May 2021 33	FC Emmen	3–1	SC Heerenveen	Emmen
14:30 CEST (UTC+2)	Peña 21' (pen.), 53' (pen.); Laursen 82'	Report	Schöne (red card) 27'; Van Hecke (yellow card) 52'; De Jong (yellow card) 76'; Nygren 88'; Van Ottele (red card) 90+2'	Stadium: De Oude Meerdijk; Attendance: 0 Referee: Bas Nijhuis

16 May 2021 34	VVV-Venlo	0–4	FC Emmen	Venlo
14:30 CEST (UTC+2)	Pachonik (yellow card) 39'; Post (yellow card) 84'	Report	Bijl (yellow card) 24'; Adžić 36'; Peña 53' (pen.); Bernadou (yellow card) 61'; De Leeuw 64'; Gladon 81'	Stadium: De Koel; Attendance: 0 Referee: Danny Makkelie

==== Promotion/relegation play-offs ====
20 May 2021 Semi-finals	FC Emmen	1–1 (a.e.t.) (3–4 p)	NAC Breda	Emmen
21:00 CEST (UTC+2)	Peña (yellow card) 72'; Hendriks 80' (o.g.)	Report	Immers 16'; Azarkan (yellow card) 34'; Hendriks (yellow card) 58'	Stadium: De Oude Meerdijk; Attendance: 1,200; Referee: Allard Lindhout
	Penalties
	De Leeuw (penalty scored); Araujo (penalty scored); Veendorp (penalty missed); Bijl (penalty scored); Peña (penalty missed)		(penalty scored) Van Hooijdonk; (penalty scored) Fiorini; (penalty scored) Jansen; (penalty missed) Malone; (penalty scored) El Allouchi

=== KNVB Cup ===
28 October 2020 First round	FC Emmen	2–0	FC Eindhoven	Emmen
19:45 CET (UTC+1)	De Leeuw 78', 94'	Report		Stadium: De Oude Meerdijk; Attendance: 0 Referee: Ingmar Oostrom

15 December 2020 Second round	FC Emmen	2–1	FC Groningen	Emmen
21:00 CET (UTC+1)	Bijl 60'; Jansen 67'	Report	Lundqvist 27'	Stadium: De Oude Meerdijk; Attendance: 0 Referee: Kevin Blom

20 January 2021 Round of 16	FC Emmen	1–2	SC Heerenveen	Emmen
16:30 CET (UTC+1)	Peña 44'	Report	Nygren 72'; J. Veerman 90' (pen.)	Stadium: De Oude Meerdijk; Attendance: 0 Referee: Siemen Mulder
