= 2015–16 FC Groningen season =

FC Groningen
2015–16 season
- Head coach: Erwin van de Looi
- Stadium: Euroborg
- Eredivisie: 7th
- KNVB Cup: 3rd round
- Top goalscorer: League: Michael de Leeuw (9 goals); All: Michael de Leeuw (10 goals)
- Biggest win: 2-0 (against Excelsior Rotterdam, AZ Alkmaar, PEC Zwolle and SC Cambuur) and 3-1 (against SC Heerenveen, PEC Zwolle and De Graafschap) in Eredivisie
- Biggest defeat: 5-0 (against SBV Vitesse in Eredivisie)
Home colours

FC Groningen finished 2015–16 Eredivisie season as 7th.

The club competed also in the KNVB Cup. FC Groningen lost 5–3 against FC Utrecht after extra time in the 3rd round and they are eliminated from the cup.

FC Groningen participated in the group stage of the Europa League, ultimately finishing in fourth place and failing to qualify for the knockout rounds.

Michael de Leeuw was the top scorer of the club in this season with 9 goals in Eredivisie and 1 goal in KNVB with a total of 10.

Sergio Padt was the most appeared players in this season with 43 appearances; 35 appearances in Eredivisie, 2 appearances in the KNVB Cup and 6 appearances in Europa League.

== Players ==
=== First-team squad ===
Note: Flags indicate national team as defined under FIFA eligibility rules; some limited exceptions apply. Players may hold more than one non-FIFA nationality.

No.	Pos.	Nation	Player
1	GK	NED	Sergio Padt
2	DF	NED	Johan Kappelhof
3	DF	BRA	Eric Botteghin
4	DF	NED	Martijn van der Laan
5	DF	NED	Lorenzo Burnet
6	MF	NED	Etiënne Reijnen
7	FW	CUW	Jarchinio Antonia
8	FW	NED	Michael de Leeuw
9	FW	NED	Danny Hoesen
10	MF	SVK	Albert Rusnák
11	FW	NED	Bryan Linssen
13	FW	NOR	Alexander Sørloth
14	FW	MAR	Mimoun Mahi
17	MF	NED	Jesper Drost
19	FW	MNE	Dino Islamović

No.	Pos.	Nation	Player
21	DF	SWE	Rasmus Lindgren
22	MF	SWE	Simon Tibbling
23	MF	NED	Hedwiges Maduro
26	GK	NED	Peter van der Vlag
28	MF	NED	Abel Tamata
33	MF	NED	Hans Hateboer
35	DF	NED	Glenn Bijl
37	DF	USA	Desevio Payne
38	MF	CUW	Juninho Bacuna
45	FW	MAR	Oussama Idrissi
46	MF	NED	Gijs Jasper
50	MF	NED	Keziah Veendorp
52	FW	NED	Robbert de Vos
—	DF	DEN	Kasper Larsen
—	DF	NED	Tom Hiariej

== Transfers ==
=== In ===
Pos.	Player	Transferred from	Fee	Date
MF	(Netherlands) Paco van Moorsel	(Netherlands) NEC Nijmegen	End of loan	30 Jun 2015
DF	(Nigeria) William Troost-Ekong	(Netherlands) FC Dordrecht	End of loan	30 Jun 2015
FW	(Netherlands) Bryan Linssen	(Netherlands) Heracles Almelo	€850,000	1 Jul 2015
FW	(Netherlands) Abel Tamata	(Netherlands) PSV Eindhoven	Free	1 Jul 2015
DF	(United States) Desevio Payne	(Netherlands) Young Groningen		1 Jul 2015
MF	(Curaçao) Juninho Bacuna	(Netherlands) Jong Groningen		1 Jul 2015
FW	(Morocco) Oussama Idrissi	(Netherlands) Feyenoord U19	Free	1 Jul 2015
MF	(Netherlands) Jesper Drost	(Netherlands) PEC Zwolle	€1,450,000	30 Jul 2015
MF	(Netherlands) Etiënne Reijnen	(Netherlands) SC Cambuur	€640,000	14 Aug 2015
MF	(Denmark) Kasper Larsen	(Denmark) Odense Boldklub	€450,000	14 Aug 2015
MF	(Netherlands) Hedwiges Maduro	(Greece) PAOK FC	Free	26 Aug 2015
FW	(Norway) Alexander Sørloth	(Norway) Rosenborg BK	€550,000	1 Jan 2016

=== Out ===
Pos.	Player	Transferred to	Fee	Date
MF	(Netherlands) Paco van Moorsel	(Netherlands) Sparta Rotterdam	Free	1 Jul 2015
MF	(Suriname) Tjaronn Chery	(England) Queens Park Rangers F.C.	€2,034,000	20 Jul 2015
FW	(Netherlands) Género Zeefuik	(Turkey) Balıkesirspor	Free	21 Jul 2015
MF	(Netherlands) Maikel Kieftenbeld	(England) Birmingham City F.C.	€250,000	27 Jul 2015
DF	(Nigeria) William Troost-Ekong	(Belgium) K.A.A. Gent	Free	27 Jul 2015
DF	(Brazil) Eric Botteghin	(Netherlands) Feyenoord	€2,500,000	13 Aug 2015
DF	(Netherlands) Martijn van der Laan	(Netherlands) SC Cambuur	On loan	17 Aug 2015
MF	(Netherlands) Nick van der Velden	(Netherlands) Willem II	Free	20 Aug 2015
MF	(Netherlands) Yoëll van Nieff	(Netherlands) Excelsior Rotterdam	On loan	26 Aug 2015
MF	(Netherlands) Hilal Ben Moussa	(Netherlands) FC Volendam	Free	31 Aug 2015
MF	(Netherlands) Tom Hiariej	(Netherlands) SC Cambuur	On loan	11 Jan 2016
DF	(Netherlands) Johan Kappelhof	(United States) Chicago Fire FC	€350,000	2 Feb 2016
FW	(North Macedonia) Hristijan Denkovski	No club	Released	12 Aug 2015

== Pre-season and friendlies ==
Win Draw Loss

18 July 2015 Friendly	FC Groningen	0-3	Southampton F.C.	Groningen
14:30		Report		Stadium: Euroborg

== Competitions ==
=== Overall record ===
Competition	First match	Last match	Starting round	Final position	Record							
Competition	First match	Last match	Starting round	Final position	Pld	W	D	L	GF	GA	GD	Win %
Eredivisie	12 August 2015	1 May 2016	Week 1	7th	34	14	8	12	41	48	−7	41.18
KNVB	23 September 2015	28 October 2015	3rd round	3rd round	2	1	0	1	3	6	−3	50.00
Europa League	17 September 2015	10 December 2015	Group phase	Group phase	6	0	2	4	2	8	−6	0.00
Total					42	15	10	17	46	62	−16	35.71

Source: Competitions

=== Eredivisie ===
==== Results summary ====
Overall								Home						Away					
Pld	W	D	L	GF	GA	GD	Pts	W	D	L	GF	GA	GD	W	D	L	GF	GA	GD
34	14	8	12	41	48	−7	50	10	3	4	25	19	+6	4	5	8	16	29	−13

==== Results by round ====
Round	1	2	3	4	5	6	7	8	9	10	11	12	13	14	15	16	17	18	19	20	21	22	23	24	25	26	27	28	29	30	31	32	33	34
Ground	H	A	H	A	H	H	A	A	H	A	H	A	A	H	A	H	A	H	H	A	A	H	H	A	A	H	A	H	A	H	A	H	A	H
Result	D	L	W	L	W	W	L	L	W	D	W	D	W	W	D	D	L	L	D	D	W	W	L	L	L	L	L	L	W	W	D	W	W	W
Position																																		7

A = Away; H = Home; W = Win; D = Draw; L = Loss

==== Matches ====
===== 1st half =====
12 August 2015 Week 1	FC Groningen	1–1	FC Twente	Groningen
18:30	Michael de Leeuw 84'	Report	Renato Tapia 42'	Stadium: Euroborg; Attendance: 21,241

16 August 2015 Week 2	PSV Eindhoven	2–0	FC Groningen	Eindhoven
12:30	Luciano Narsingh 7' 76'	Report		Stadium: Philips Stadion; Attendance: 32,000

21 August 2015 Week 3	FC Groningen	2–0	Excelsior Rotterdam	Groningen
20:00	Mimoun Mahi 70' 86'	Report		Stadium: Euroborg; Attendance: 19,277

29 August 2015 Week 4	FC Utrecht	2-0	FC Groningen	Utrecht
18:30	Bart Ramselaar 29'; Timo Letschert 90+4'	Report		Stadium: Stadion Galgenwaard; Attendance: 14,507

13 September 2015 Week 5	FC Groningen	3–1	SC Heerenveen	Groningen
12:30	Danny Hoesen 1'; Bryan Linssen 16'; Mimoun Mahi 82'	Report	Simon Thern 69'	Stadium: Euroborg; Attendance: 21,001

20 September 2015 Week 6	FC Groningen	2–0	AZ Alkmaar	Groningen
16:45	Bryan Linssen 31'; Mimoun Mahi 90+5'	Report		Stadium: Euroborg; Attendance: 19,389

26 September 2015 Week 7	AFC Ajax	2-0	FC Groningen	Amsterdam
19:45	Nemanja Gudelj 23'; Viktor Fischer 80'	Report		Stadium: Johan Cruyff Arena; Attendance: 45,676

4 October 2015 Week 8	SBV Vitesse	5-0	FC Groningen	Arnhem
14:30	Dominic Solanke 18'; Kevin Diks 61'; Valeri Qazaishvili 65'; Nathan 87'; Abiola Dauda 90+3'	Report		Stadium: GelreDome; Attendance: 16,185

17 October 2015 Week 9	FC Groningen	2-1	Willem II	Groningen
18:30	Mimoun Mahi 24'; Danny Hoesen 86'	Report	Etiënne Reijnen 85' (o.g.)	Stadium: Euroborg; Attendance: 21,787

25 October 2015 Week 10	NEC Nijmegen	1–1	FC Groningen	Nijmegen
14:30	Christian Santos 47' (pen.)	Report	Albert Rusnák 9'	Stadium: Goffertstadion; Attendance: 11,630

31 October 2015 Week 11	FC Groningen	2–0	PEC Zwolle	Groningen
18:30	Michael de Leeuw 5'; Lorenzo Burnet 35'	Report		Stadium: Euroborg; Attendance: 21,565

8 November 2015 Week 12	Cambuur	2–2	FC Groningen	Leeuwarden
14:30	Martijn Barto 9' 13'	Report	Johan Kappelhof 52'; Jesper Drost 58'	Stadium: Cambuur Stadion; Attendance: 9,813

21 November 2015 Week 13	De Graafschap	1-2	FC Groningen	Doetinchem
20:45	Nathan Kabasele 78' (pen.)	Report	Albert Rusnák 42'; Michael de Leeuw 68'	Stadium: De Vijverberg; Attendance: 10,083

29 November 2015 Week 14	FC Groningen	2–1	ADO Den Haag	Groningen
14:30	Tom Beugelsdijk 49' (o.g.); Danny Hoesen 90+5'	Report	Édouard Duplan 24'	Stadium: Euroborg; Attendance: 19,480

6 December 2015 Week 15	Roda JC Kerkrade	0–0	FC Groningen	Kerkrade
16:45		Report		Stadium: Parkstad Limburg Stadion; Attendance: 13,171

13 December 2015 Week 16	FC Groningen	1–1	Feyenoord	Groningen
14:30	Michael de Leeuw 25'	Report	Dirk Kuyt 50'	Stadium: Euroborg; Attendance: 22,091

19 December 2015 Week 17	Heracles Almelo	2–1	FC Groningen	Almelo
20:45	Paul Gladon 41'; Gino Bosz 90'	Report	Bryan Linssen 39'	Stadium: Erve Asito; Attendance: 10,622

===== 2nd half =====
17 January 2016 Week 18	FC Groningen	1-4	FC Utrecht	Groningen
14:30	Alexander Sørloth 27'	Report	Bart Ramselaar 14'; Timo Letschert 48'; Christian Kum 59'; Andreas Ludwig 61'	Stadium: Euroborg; Attendance: 20,545

22 January 2016 Week 19	FC Groningen	0–0	NEC Nijmegen	Groningen
20:00		Report		Stadium: Euroborg; Attendance: 20,163

26 January 2016 Week 20	Willem II	1–1	FC Groningen	Tilburg
18:30	Dries Wuytens 44'	Report	Hedwiges Maduro 90+4'	Stadium: Koning Willem II Stadion; Attendance: 12,000

30 January 2024 Week 21	PEC Zwolle	1–3	FC Groningen	Zwolle
19:45	Thomas Lam 56'	Report	Alexander Sørloth 17'; Michael de Leeuw 62'; Danny Hoesen 77'	Stadium: MAC³PARK Stadion; Attendance: 12,225

7 February 2016 Week 22	FC Groningen	2–0	SC Cambuur	Groningen
14:30	Michael de Leeuw 12'; Oussama Idrissi 75'	Report		Stadium: Euroborg; Attendance: 20,743

14 February 2015 Week 23	FC Groningen	1-2	AFC Ajax	Groningen
12:30	Danny Hoesen 90+3'	Report	Anwar El Ghazi 59'; Lasse Schöne 69' (pen.)	Stadium: Euroborg; Attendance: 19,452

20 February 2016 Week 24	AZ Alkmaar	4-1	FC Groningen	Alkmaar
18:30	Vincent Janssen 24'; Ron Vlaar 34'; Ridgeciano Haps 49'; Markus Henriksen 71'	Report	Michael de Leeuw 51' (pen.)	Stadium: AFAS Stadion; Attendance: 16,325

27 February 2016 Week 25	FC Twente	2-0	FC Groningen	Enschede
18:30	Zakaria El Azzouzi 16'; Jerson Cabral 80'	Report		Stadium: De Grolsch Veste; Attendance: 25,200

5 March 2016 Week 26	FC Groningen	0-3	PSV Eindhoven	Groningen
19:45		Report	Jetro Willems 7'; Davy Pröpper 51'; Jürgen Locadia 88'	Stadium: Euroborg; Attendance: 21,983

12 March 2016 Week 27	Excelsior Rotterdam	2–1	FC Groningen	Rotterdam
20:45	Tom van Weert 49'; Jeff Stans 54' (pen.)	Report	Michael de Leeuw 71'	Stadium: Van Donge & De Roo Stadion; Attendance: 3,606

20 March 2016 Week 28	FC Groningen	0-3	SBV Vitesse	Groningen
14:30		Report	Dominic Solanke 73' 85'; Valeri Qazaishvili 78'	Stadium: Euroborg; Attendance: 21,331

3 April 2016 Week 29	ADO Den Haag	0-1	FC Groningen	The Hague
14:30		Report	Rasmus Lindgren 76'	Stadium: Bingoal Stadion; Attendance: 11,891

10 April 2016 Week 30	FC Groningen	3-1	De Graafschap	Groningen
14:30	Rasmus Lindgren 37'; Hidde Jurjus 76' (o.g.); Oussama Idrissi 80'	Report	Cas Peters 5'	Stadium: Euroborg; Attendance: 22,425

16 April 2016 Week 31	Feyenoord	1-1	FC Groningen	Rotterdam
19:45	Tonny Vilhena 65'	Report	Michael de Leeuw 24'	Stadium: De Kuip; Attendance: 47,500

19 April 2016 Week 32	FC Groningen	1–0	Roda JC Kerkrade	Groningen
18:30	Albert Rusnák 67'	Report		Stadium: Euroborg; Attendance: 20,798

1 May 2016 Week 33	SC Heerenveen	1-2	FC Groningen	Heerenveen
14:30	Sam Larsson 20'	Report	Oussama Idrissi 26'; Albert Rusnák 52'	Stadium: Abe Lenstra Stadion; Attendance: 25,385

8 May 2016 Week 34	FC Groningen	2-1	Heracles Almelo	Groningen
14:30	Rasmus Lindgren 53' 64'	Report	Iliass Bel Hassani 70'	Stadium: Euroborg; Attendance: 22,206

12 May 2016 European competition playoff 1st game	FC Groningen	2-1	Heracles Almelo	Groningen
18:30	Hans Hateboer 11'; Rasmus Lindgren 50'	Report	Wout Weghorst 45+1'	Stadium: Euroborg; Attendance: 20,477

1 May 2016 European competition playoff 2nd game	Heracles Almelo	5-1 (a.e.t.)	FC Groningen	Almelo
14:30	Ramon Zomer 83'; Paul Gladon 90+2'; Wout Weghorst 111'; Brahim Darri 115'; Joey Pelupessy 119'	Report	Albert Rusnák 63'	Stadium: Erve Asito; Attendance: 10,744

Heracles Almelo won 6–3 on aggregate.

=== KNVB Cup ===
23 September 2015 Second round	FC Groningen	2–1	FC Twente	Groningen
18:30	Bryan Linssen 53'; Hedwiges Maduro 61'	Report	Hidde ter Avest 21'	Stadium: Euroborg; Attendance: 13,605; Referee: Kevin Blom

28 October 2015 Third round	FC Utrecht	5–3 (a.e.t.)	FC Groningen	Utrecht
20:45	Bart Ramselaar 2'; Mark Diemers 55'; Yassin Ayoub 81'; Nacer Barazite 97'; Kristoffer Peterson 101'	Report	Michael de Leeuw 34'; Bryan Linssen 47'; Drost 82'	Stadium: Stadion Galgenwaard; Attendance: 14,503; Referee: Richard Liesveld

=== UEFA Europa League ===
17 September 2015 UEFA Europa League; Group F match 1	FC Groningen (Netherlands)	0–3	(France) Olympique de Marseille	Groningen
19:00		Report	Georges-Kévin Nkoudou 25'; Lucas Ocampos 40'; Romain Alessandrini 61'	Stadium: Euroborg; Attendance: 21,520; Referee: (Ukraine) Yevhen Aranovsky

1 October 2015 UEFA Europa League; Gorup F match 2	S.C. Braga (Portugal)	1–0	(Netherlands) FC Groningen	Braga
21:05	Ahmed Hassan 5'	Report		Stadium: Estádio Municipal de Braga; Attendance: 9,150; Referee: (Scotland) Bobby Madden

22 October 2015 UEFA Europa League; Gorup F match 3	FC Slovan Liberec (Czech Republic)	1–1	(Netherlands) FC Groningen	Liberec
21:05	Kevin Luckassen 87'	Report	Danny Hoesen 90+6'	Stadium: Stadion u Nisy; Attendance: 8,793; Referee: (Germany) Christian Dingert

5 November 2015 UEFA Europa League; Gorup F match 4	FC Groningen (Netherlands)	0–1	(Czech Republic) FC Slovan Liberec	Groningen
19:00		Report	Sergio Padt 81' (o.g.)	Stadium: Euroborg; Attendance: 18,693; Referee: (Poland) Marcin Borski

26 November 2015 UEFA Europa League; Gorup F match 3	Olympique de Marseille (France)	2–1	(Netherlands) FC Groningen	Marseille
21:05	Georges-Kévin Nkoudou 28'; Michy Batshuayi 88'	Report	Hedwiges Maduro 50'	Stadium: Stade Vélodrome; Attendance: 9,107; Referee: (Latvia) Andris Treimanis

10 December 2015 UEFA Europa League; Gorup F match 6	FC Groningen (Netherlands)	0–0	(Portugal) S.C. Braga	Groningen
19:00		Report		Stadium: Euroborg; Attendance: 15,715; Referee: (Wales) Simon Lee Evans

== Statistics ==
=== Scorers ===
#	Player	Eredivisie	KNVB	Europa League	Total
1	(Netherlands) Michael de Leeuw	9	1	0	10
2	(Netherlands) Danny Hoesen	5	0	1	6
3	(Slovakia) Albert Rusnák	5	0	0	5
3	(Netherlands) Bryan Linssen	3	2	0	5
3	(Sweden) Rasmus Lindgren	5	0	0	5
6	(Netherlands) Hedwiges Maduro	1	1	1	3
6	(Morocco) Mimoun Mahi	3	0	0	3
6	(Morocco) Oussama Idrissi	3	0	0	3
9	(Norway) Alexander Sørloth	2	0	0	2
9	(Netherlands) Jesper Drost	1	1	0	2
9	(Morocco) Mimoun Mahi	2	0	0	2
12	(Netherlands) Hans Hateboer	1	0	0	1
12	(Netherlands) Johan Kappelhof	1	0	0	1
12	(Netherlands) Lorenzo Burnet	1	0	0	1

=== Appearances ===
#	Player	Eredivisie	KNVB	Europa League	Total
1	(Netherlands) Sergio Padt	35	2	6	43
2	(Netherlands) Etiënne Reijnen	33	2	5	40
2	(Netherlands) Hans Hateboer	32	2	6	40
4	(Slovakia) Albert Rusnák	31	2	6	39
4	(Sweden) Simon Tibbling	32	2	6	39
6	(Netherlands) Bryan Linssen	29	2	6	37
6	(Netherlands) Hedwiges Maduro	29	2	6	37
8	(Netherlands) Michael de Leeuw	29	2	4	35
9	(Netherlands) Jesper Drost	30	1	3	34
10	(Netherlands) Danny Hoesen	26	1	6	33
11	(Netherlands) Johan Kappelhof	18	2	6	26
12	(Curaçao) Jarchinio Antonia	17	2	5	24
13	(Netherlands) Lorenzo Burnet	21	1	1	23
13	(Sweden) Rasmus Lindgren	22	0	1	23
15	(Netherlands) Abel Tamata	15	1	5	21
16	(Denmark) Kasper Larsen	13	1	5	19
17	(Morocco) Mimoun Mahi	13	1	3	17
17	(Morocco) Oussama Idrissi	17	0	0	17
17	(Curaçao) Juninho Bacuna	15	1	1	17
20	(Norway) Alexander Sørloth	14	0	0	14
21	(United States) Desevio Payne	9	0	0	9
22	(Netherlands) Tom Hiariej	4	1	0	5
23	(Brazil) Eric Botteghin	1	0	0	1
23	(Netherlands) Keziah Veendorp	1	0	0	1

=== Clean sheets ===
#	Player	Eredivisie	Europa League	Total
1	(Netherlands) Sergio Padt	8	1	9
Total		8	1	9

=== Disciplinary record ===
#	Player	Eredivisie		KNVB		Europa League		Total	
#	Player	Yellow card	Red card	Yellow card	Red card	Yellow card	Red card	Yellow card	Red card
1	(Netherlands) Michael de Leeuw	5	1	1	0	1	1	7	2
2	(Denmark) Kasper Larsen	1	1	1	0	0	0	2	1
3	(Netherlands) Hans Hateboer	8	0	1	0	2	0	11	0
4	(Netherlands) Bryan Linssen	6	0	0	0	1	0	7	0
5	(Netherlands) Johan Kappelhof	5	0	1	0	0	0	6	0
5	(Sweden) Simon Tibbling	4	0	0	0	2	0	6	0
7	(Netherlands) Lorenzo Burnet	5	0	0	0	0	0	5	0
8	(Slovakia) Albert Rusnák	4	0	0	0	0	0	4	0
9	(Netherlands) Etiënne Reijnen	3	0	0	0	0	0	3	0
9	(Curaçao) Juninho Bacuna	2	0	0	0	1	0	3	0
9	(Netherlands) Sergio Padt	3	0	0	0	0	0	3	0
12	(Norway) Alexander Sørloth	2	0	0	0	0	0	2	0
12	(Netherlands) Hedwiges Maduro	2	0	0	0	0	0	2	0
12	(Netherlands) Jesper Drost	2	0	0	0	0	0	2	0
12	(Morocco) Oussama Idrissi	2	0	0	0	0	0	2	0
12	(Sweden) Rasmus Lindgren	2	0	0	0	0	0	2	0
17	(Netherlands) Danny Hoesen	0	0	0	0	1	0	1	0
17	(United States) Desevio Payne	1	0	0	0	0	0	1	0
17	(Curaçao) Jarchinio Antonia	1	0	0	0	0	0	1	0
