= 2019–20 FC Emmen season =

FC Emmen
2019–20 season
- Manager: Dick Lukkien
- Stadium: De Oude Meerdijk
- Eredivisie: 12th
- KNVB Cup: First round
- Average home league attendance: 8,164
Home colours	Away colours
- All statistics correct as of 08:16, 27 May 2020 (UTC).

During the 2019–20 season, FC Emmen participated in the Eredivisie and the KNVB Cup. Due to the COVID-19 pandemic, the Eredivisie season was abandoned with FC Emmen in 12th place. They were knocked out in the first round of the KNVB Cup, losing in the first round at NAC Breda.

== Competitions ==
=== Eredivisie ===
==== League table ====
Pos	Team	Pld	W	D	L	GF	GA	GD	Pts
10	Heerenveen	26	8	9	9	41	41	0	33
11	Sparta Rotterdam	26	9	6	11	41	45	−4	33
12	FC Emmen	26	9	5	12	32	45	−13	32
13	VVV-Venlo	26	8	4	14	24	51	−27	28
14	FC Twente	26	7	6	13	34	46	−12	27

Source: eredivisie.nl
Rules for classification: Season in progress: 1) Most points won; 2) Less points lost; 3) Goal difference; 4) Goals scored; 5) Alphabetical order; End of season: 1) Points; 2) Goal difference; 3) Goals scored; 4) Head-to-head points; 5) Head-to-head goal difference; 6) Head-to-head away goals scored; 7) Play-off if relevant for deciding champion, relegation or participating in a European league, otherwise by draw. 8) Penalty shoot-out (only after a play-off)

=== KNVB Cup ===
29 October 2019 First round	NAC Breda	3–2	FC Emmen	Breda
20:45 CET	Van Hooijdonk 31'; Riera 54'; Stokkers 74'	Report	Chacon 42'; De Leeuw 60'	Stadium: Rat Verlegh Stadion; Attendance: 10,102; Referee: Makkelie

== Player Transfers ==
=== Players In ===
Date	Position	Player	From	Type	Fee	Ref.
1 July 2019	GK	(Germany) Matthias Hamrol	(Poland) Korona Kielce	Transfer	Free	
1 July 2019	FW	(Croatia) Marko Kolar	(Poland) Wisla Krakow	Transfer	Undisclosed	
1 July 2019	DF	(Netherlands) Ferhat Görgülü	(Turkey) Giresunspor	Transfer	Free	
1 July 2019	DF	(United States) Desevio Payne	(Netherlands) Excelsior	Transfer	Free	
1 July 2019	DF	(Netherlands) Lorenzo Burnet	(Netherlands) Excelsior	Transfer	Free	
1 July 2019	DF	(Germany) Jan-Niklas Beste	(Germany) Werder Bremen	Loan	Season Loan	
3 July 2019	MF	(Switzerland) Filip Ugrinic	(Switzerland) FC Luzern	Loan	Season loan	
5 July 2019	DF	(Croatia) Leon Sopic	(Croatia) NK Rudes	Transfer	Undisclosed	
8 July 2019	GK	(Netherlands) Stefan van der Lei	No Club	Transfer	Free	
9 July 2019	MF	(Denmark) Nikolai Laursen	(Netherlands) PSV	Transfer	Undisclosed	
14 July 2019	FW	(Switzerland) Shani Tarashaj	(England) Everton	Loan	2 season loan	
16 July 2019	MF	(Netherlands) Tom Hiariej	(Australia) Central Coast Mariners	Transfer	Free	

=== Players Out ===
Date	Position	Player	To	Type	Fee	Ref.
1 July 2019	FW	(Denmark) Nicklas Pedersen	N/A	Retired	N/A	
1 July 2019	GK	(Netherlands) Peter van der Vlag	(Netherlands) SC Cambuur (GK Coach)	Retired	N/A	
1 July 2019	DF	(Netherlands) Stef Gronsveld	(Netherlands) FC Dordrecht	Transfer	Free	
1 July 2019	DF	(Netherlands) Tim Siekman	Released	Transfer	Free	
1 July 2019	DF	(Netherlands) Gersom Klok	(Netherlands) HHC Hardenberg	Transfer	Free	
1 July 2019	MF	(Netherlands) Hilal Ben Moussa	(Romania) Sepsi OSK	Transfer	Free	
1 July 2019	DF	(Netherlands) Caner Cavlan	FK Austria Wien	Transfer	Free	
1 July 2019	DF	(Germany) Nico Neidhart	(Germany) Hansa Rostock	Transfer	Free	
1 July 2019	MF	(Belgium) Jason Bourdouxhe	(Netherlands) TOP Oss	Transfer	Free	
1 July 2019	FW	(Netherlands) Kasper Oldenburger	(Netherlands) Harkemase Boys	Transfer	Free	
1 July 2019	MF	(Netherlands) Emil Bijlsma	(Netherlands) Hoogeveen	Transfer	Free	
1 July 2019	DF	(Netherlands) Stephen Warmolts	(Netherlands) HHC Hardenberg	Transfer	Free	
1 July 2019	MF	(Netherlands) Delano Grootenhuis	Released	Transfer	Free	
1 July 2019	MF	(Netherlands) Rob Deiman	Released	Transfer	Free	
11 July 2019	MF	(Netherlands) Alexander Bannink	(Netherlands) Go Ahead Eagles	Transfer	Undisclosed	
