= Sergio Peña (Peruvian footballer) =

Peruvian footballer (born 1995)

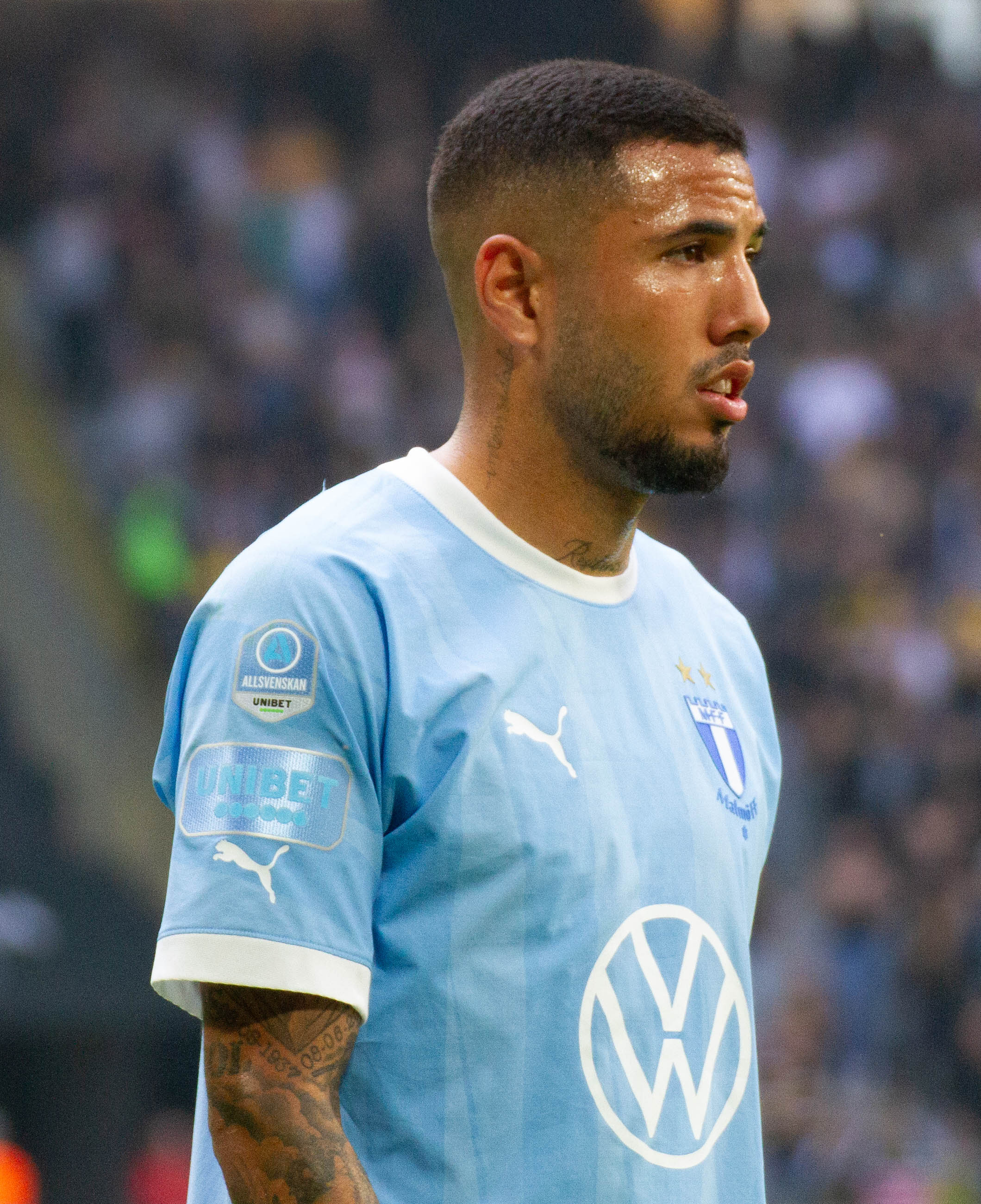
- Peña with Malmö FF in 2023

Personal information
- Full name: Sergio Fernando Peña Flores
- Date of birth: 28 September 1995 (age 31)
- Place of birth: Lima, Peru
- Height: 1.77 m (5 ft 10 in)
- Position: Midfielder

Team information
- Current team: OFK Beograd
- Number: 6

Youth career
- 2003–2013: Alianza Lima

Senior career*
Years	Team	Apps	(Gls)
2012–2014	Alianza Lima	30	(0)
2014–2017	Granada B	38	(5)
2015-2016	→ Alianza Lima (loan)	8	(0)
2016–2017	→ Universidad San Martín (loan)	27	(3)
2017–2019	Granada	19	(1)
2018–2019	→ Tondela (loan)	32	(1)
2019–2021	FC Emmen	55	(10)
2021–2025	Malmö FF	78	(3)
2025	PAOK	5	(0)
2025–2026	Alianza Lima	12	(2)
2026	Sakaryaspor	13	(0)
2026–	OFK Beograd	2	(1)

International career^{‡}
2015	Peru U20	20	(6)
2017–	Peru	51	(4)
- * Club domestic league appearances and goals as of 2 August 2026 ‡ National team caps and goals as of 23:18, 9 September 2025 (UTC)

Sergio Fernando Peña Flores (born 28 September 1995) is a Peruvian professional footballer who plays as an attacking midfielder for OFK Beograd and the Peru national team.

== Club career ==
Born in Lima, Peña finished his formation with hometown's Alianza Lima, after joining the club's youth setup in 2003, aged eight. On 18 February 2012, aged only 16, he made his first team debut, starting in a 2–2 home draw against León de Huánuco for the Torneo Descentralizado championship. It was his maiden appearance of the season, under manager Pepe Soto.

Peña was made a starter by new manager Wilmar Valencia for the 2013 campaign. On 16 March 2013, he played his first Peruvian Clásico, replacing Henry Quinteros in the 69th minute and providing the assist for Yordy Reyna's winning goal in the 84th minute.

On 23 May 2013, Peña was sold to an investment group linked to Udinese Calcio and Granada CF. He was assigned to the latter's reserves in Segunda División B.

Peña subsequently had loans to his former club Alianza Lima and Universidad de San Martín de Porres, before returning to Granada and its reserve team in January 2017. On 1 September of that year, he extended his contract until 2020 and was definitely promoted to the main squad.

On 13 July 2018, Peña was loaned to Primeira Liga side C.D. Tondela on a one-year deal.

On 3 August 2019, he signed for Eredivisie side FC Emmen on a three-year contract.

On 4 August 2021, he penned a deal with Allsvenskan side Malmö FF through 2024.

On 11 January 2025, he signed for PAOK on a three-year contract.

== International career ==
Peña was named in the Peru national team's senior squad for the 2018 World Cup qualifiers against Argentina and Chile in September 2016, as well as the qualifiers against Venezuela and Uruguay in March 2017. In May 2018, he was named in Peru’s provisional 24 man squad for the 2018 World Cup in Russia. However, a few days later he was taken off the provisional 24-man squad to make room for Paolo Guerrero, with Pena saying "It was the hardest day of my career."

== Career statistics ==
=== Club ===
As of match played 25 August 2025

Appearances and goals by club, season, and competition
Club	Season	League			National cup		League cup		Continental		Other		Total	
Club	Season	Division	Apps	Goals	Apps	Goals	Apps	Goals	Apps	Goals	Apps	Goals	Apps	Goals
Alianza Lima	2012	Torneo Descentralizado	1	0	—		—		—		—		1	0
Alianza Lima	2013	Torneo Descentralizado	21	0	—		—		—		—		21	0
Alianza Lima	2014	Torneo Descentralizado	8	0	0	0	—		—		—		8	0
Alianza Lima	Total		30	0	0	0	0	0	0	0	0	0	30	0
Granada B	2013–14	Segunda División B	8	0	—		—		—		—		8	0
Granada B	2014–15	Segunda División B	14	1	—		—		—		—		14	1
Granada B	2016–17	Segunda División B	16	4	—		—		—		—		16	4
Granada B	Total		38	5	0	0	0	0	0	0	0	0	38	5
Alianza Lima (loan)	2015	Torneo Descentralizado	8	0	0	0	—		—		—		8	0
Universidad de San Martín (loan)	2016	Torneo Descentralizado	27	3	0	0	—		—		—		27	3
Granada	2017–18	Segunda División	19	1	0	0	—		—		—		19	1
Tondela (loan)	2018–19	Primeira Liga	32	1	3	0	3	0	—		—		38	1
Emmen	2019–20	Eredivisie	23	4	1	0	—		—		—		24	4
Emmen	2020–21	Eredivisie	32	6	3	1	—		—		1 (Note: Appearance in Relegation Playoffs)	0	36	7
Emmen	Total		55	10	4	1	0	0	0	0	1	0	60	11
Malmö	2021	Allsvenskan	9	0	0	0	—		5 (Note: Appearances in UEFA Champions League)	0	—		14	0
Malmö	2022	Allsvenskan	19	1	6	0	—		11 (Note: Four appearances in UEFA Champions League, seven appearances in UEFA Europa League)	0	—		36	1
Malmö	2023	Allsvenskan	29	1	3	0	—		—		—		32	1
Malmö	2024	Allsvenskan	21	1	4	1	—		12 (Note: Six appearances in UEFA Champions League, six appearances in UEFA Europa League)	0	—		37	2
Malmö	Total		78	3	13	1	0	0	28	0	0	0	119	4
PAOK	2024–25	Super League Greece	5	0	—		—		0	0	—		5	0
PAOK	2025–26	Super League Greece	0	0	0	0	—		0	0	—		0	0
PAOK	Total		5	0	0	0	0	0	0	0	0	0	5	0
Alianza Lima	2025	Peruvian Primera División	3	1	0	0	—		4 (Note: Appearances in Copa Sudamericana)	0	—		7	1
Career total			295	24	20	2	3	0	32	0	1	0	351	26

=== International ===
As of match played on 9 September 2025

Appearances and goals by national team and year
National team	Year	Apps	Goals
Peru	2017	4	0
Peru	2018	5	0
Peru	2020	1	0
Peru	2021	12	3
Peru	2022	8	0
Peru	2023	5	0
Peru	2024	12	1
Peru	2025	4	0
Total		51	4

As of match played 11 November 2021. Scores and results list Peru's goal tally first.

No.	Date	Venue	Opponent	Score	Result	Competition
1	20 June 2021	Estádio Olímpico Pedro Ludovico, Goiânia, Brazil	Colombia	1–0	2–1	2021 Copa América
2	7 October 2021	Estadio Nacional, Lima, Peru	Chile	2–0	2–0	2022 FIFA World Cup qualification
3	11 November 2021	Estadio Nacional, Lima, Peru	Bolivia	3–0	3–0	2022 FIFA World Cup qualification
4	26 March 2024	Estadio Monumental "U", Lima, Peru	Dominican Republic	1–0	4–1	Friendly

== Honours ==
Malmö FF

- Allsvenskan: 2021, 2023, 2024
- Svenska Cupen: 2021–22, 2023–24
