= Kerim Frei =

Turkish footballer (born 1993)

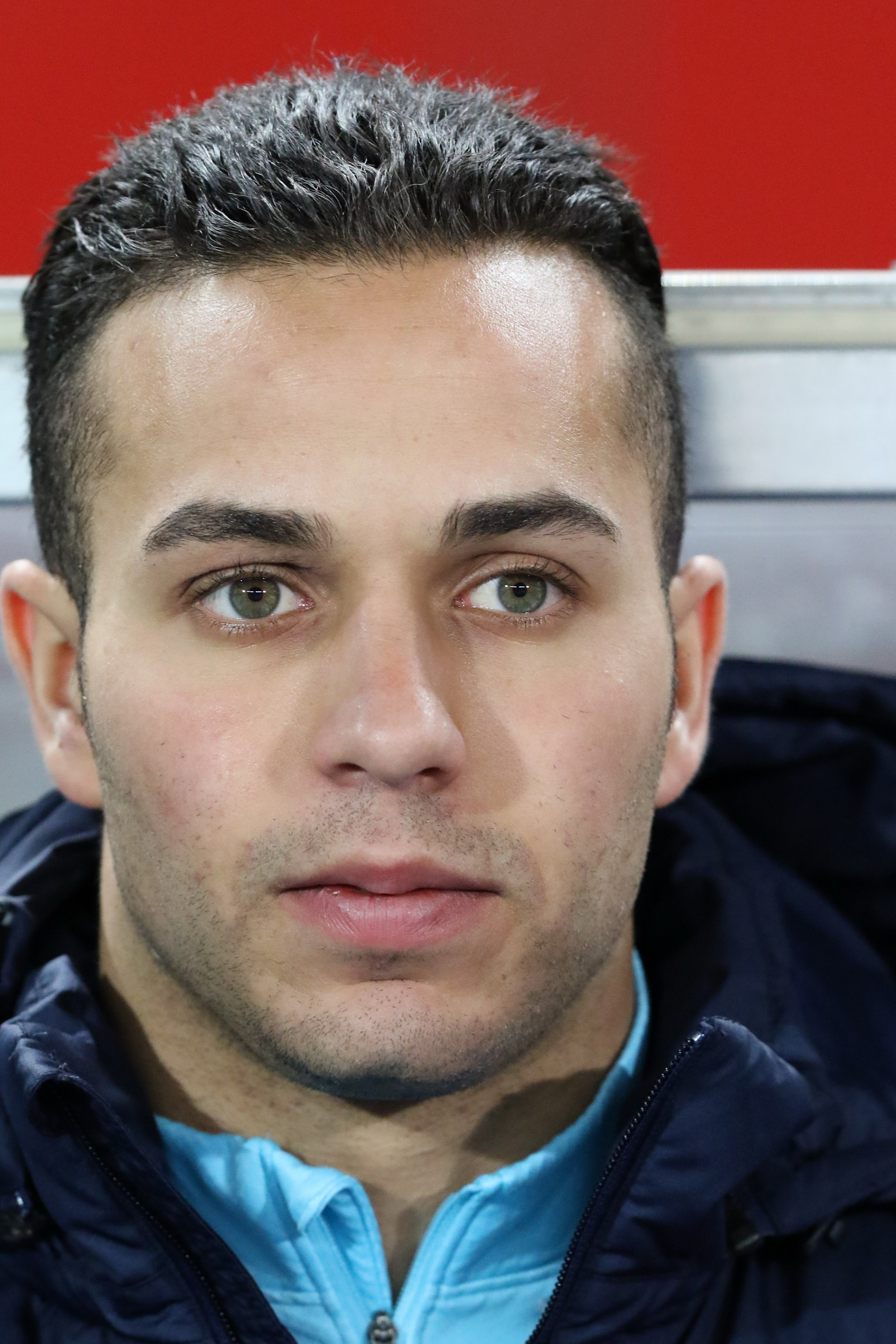
- Frei with Turkey in 2016

Personal information
- Full name: Kerim Frei Koyunlu
- Date of birth: 19 November 1993 (age 33)
- Place of birth: Feldkirch, Austria
- Height: 1.71 m (5 ft 7 in)
- Position: Winger

Team information
- Current team: Sakaryaspor
- Number: 10

Youth career
- 2006–2010: Grasshopper
- 2010–2011: Fulham

Senior career*
Years	Team	Apps	(Gls)
2011–2013	Fulham	23	(0)
2012	→ Cardiff City (loan)	3	(0)
2013–2017	Beşiktaş	68	(7)
2017	Birmingham City	13	(1)
2017–2021	İstanbul Başakşehir	40	(3)
2019	→ Maccabi Haifa (loan)	16	(1)
2020	→ Emmen (loan)	4	(1)
2021	Emmen	18	(0)
2021–2023	Fatih Karagümrük	28	(3)
2023–2024	Manisa	25	(1)
2024–2025	Elazığspor	33	(5)
2025–2026	24 Erzincanspor	17	(0)
2026	Batman Petrolspor	17	(5)
2026–	Sakaryaspor	4	(2)

International career
2008	Switzerland U15	1	(0)
2010–2011	Switzerland U18	7	(4)
2011	Switzerland U19	7	(1)
2012	Switzerland U21	2	(0)
2013	Turkey U20	5	(0)
2013–2014	Turkey U21	6	(3)
2013–2015	Turkey A2	2	(1)
2012–2016	Turkey	5	(0)
- * Club domestic league appearances and goals as of 1 October 2026

Kerim Frei Koyunlu (born 19 November 1993) is a footballer who plays as a winger for TFF 2. Lig club Sakaryaspor. Born in Austria, he plays for the Turkey national team. He previously played club football for Fulham, Cardiff City, İstanbul Başakşehir, Beşiktaş, Birmingham City and Maccabi Haifa, and represented Switzerland up to under-21 level.

== Early life ==
Frei was born in Feldkirch, Austria, to a Turkish father and a Moroccan mother and was raised in Switzerland.

== Career ==
=== Fulham ===
Frei made his first team début on 7 July 2011 in Fulham's Europa League first qualifying round, second leg match against NSÍ Runavík of the Faroe Islands, where he came on as a substitute in the 72nd minute replacing Andrew Johnson. Following his debut, Huw Jennings gave his thoughts about Frei debut to Fulham.com:

For Kerim the change to go into the First Team has come early. He’s 17 years of age and had always been an exciting prospect. The Club's involvement in the Europa League has really helped to show what he can offer at First Team level. He [Frei] doesn’t lack for confidence - he’s a confident boy in terms of his own ability. He’s not an arrogant person – he’s very humble in lots of respects but what you see with Kerim is someone who, when he comes onto the pitch, comes alive. He explodes when he gets opportunities to get on the ball and it’s great to see someone with his qualities being recognised and having a chance to participate.

Frei then went on to make his first start for Fulham, playing on the right wing in the Europa League second qualifying round, first leg match against Crusaders in Belfast on 14 July 2011, receiving a yellow card in the 62nd minute.

He made his first start in English competition in a League Cup third round fixture away to Chelsea on 21 September 2011 and made his Premier League début on 10 December 2011, coming on a substitute for Mousa Dembélé in an away match against Swansea City. Fulham lost the match 2–0. Frei scored his first senior goal for Fulham in the Europa League 2–2 draw against Odense BK at Craven Cottage, side footing home from a Dembélé through ball.

On 16 March 2012, Frei signed a contract extension with Fulham, lasting until the summer of 2015. A week later, Frei started in Fulham's 1–0 defeat at Old Trafford against Manchester United. He was replaced by Bryan Ruiz in the 67th minute.

On 9 April 2012 in a 1–1 draw against Chelsea, Frei received the Man of the Match award from Sky Television for his performance.

On 26 October 2012, Frei joined Cardiff City on loan until 2 December. His first appearance was against Burnley, coming on in the 83rd minute for Craig Noone. On 22 November, Frei was recalled to Fulham after 3 appearances.

=== Beşiktaş ===
Frei joined Turkish club Beşiktaş on 6 September 2013, signing a five-year deal. He made his league debut on 22 September 2013 in a 3–0 loss to Galatasaray, coming on in the 80th minute for Veli Kavlak. He scored his first league goal for Besiktas over a year later in a 3–2 loss to Kayseri Erciyesspor. He scored a brace in this game, one goal in the 70th minute, the other in the 85th, coming after he had come on for an injured Olcay Şahan in the 37th minute.

=== Birmingham City ===
On 20 January 2017, Frei returned to English football, signing for Birmingham City on a three-and-a-half-year contract. The fee was an initial €2.25 million, potentially rising to €3.5M. He made his debut in the EFL Championship the following day, as an 82nd-minute substitute in a 1–1 draw away to Blackburn Rovers, but never established himself in the team. He finished the season with 13 league appearances, only 3 of which were in the starting eleven, and was an unused substitute 16 times. He scored once, with a 28-yard (26 m) free kick away to Rotherham United on 14 April; Frei "stepped up and arrowed the ball straight and dipping beyond [Rotherham's goalkeeper]" to win the club's Goal of the Season award but not the match.

=== İstanbul Başakşehir ===
After just six months with Birmingham City, Frei returned to Turkey. He signed a four-year contract with İstanbul Başakşehir on 21 July 2017. He made his league debut for his new club on 19 August 2017 in a 3–1 loss to Kardemir Karabükspor.

==== Loans to Maccabi Haifa and FC Emmen ====
He spent the second half of the 2018–19 season on loan at Maccabi Haifa. After returning to his parent club and having little playing time, Frei joined Dutch Eredivisie club Emmen in January 2020 on loan with an option to purchase.

=== Emmen ===
On 16 January 2021, Frei joined Eredivise club Emmen permanently, signing a one-and-a-half contract.

=== Manisa FK ===
On 4 July 2023, Frei joined Turkish 1.Lig side Manisa FK on a 2-year deal, with a 1-year option.

== International career ==
Frei switched national team allegiances from Switzerland to Turkey in June 2012. He represented Turkey at the 2013 FIFA U-20 World Cup.

== Career statistics ==
As of match played 26 July 2023

Appearances and goals by club, season and competition
Club	Season	League			National Cup		League Cup		Other		Total	
Club	Season	Division	Apps	Goals	Apps	Goals	Apps	Goals	Apps	Goals	Apps	Goals
Fulham	2011–12	Premier League	16	0	1	0	1	0	7 (Note: Appearances in UEFA Europa League)	1	25	1
Fulham	2012–13	Premier League	7	0	1	0	0	0	—		8	0
Fulham	Total		23	0	2	0	1	0	7	1	33	1
Cardiff City (loan)	2012–13	Championship	3	0	—		—		—		3	0
Beşiktaş	2013–14	Süper Lig	9	0	1	0	—		—		10	0
Beşiktaş	2014–15	Süper Lig	29	3	7	0	—		12 (Note: Three appearances and one goal in UEFA Champions League, nine appearances in Europa League)	1	48	4
Beşiktaş	2015–16	Süper Lig	23	4	9	1	—		5	0	37	5
Beşiktaş	2016–17	Süper Lig	7	0	4	4	—		3 (Note: Two appearances in Champions League, one in Turkish Super Cup)	0	14	4
Beşiktaş	Total		68	7	21	5	—		20	1	109	13
Birmingham City	2016–17	Championship	13	1	—		—		—		13	1
İstanbul Başakşehir	2017–18	Süper Lig	22	3	2	0	—		8 (Note: Three appearances in Champions League, five appearances and one goal in Europa League)	1	32	4
İstanbul Başakşehir	2018–19	Süper Lig	8	0	3	1	—		2	0	13	1
İstanbul Başakşehir	2019–20	Süper Lig	3	0	3	0	—		0	0	6	0
İstanbul Başakşehir	2020–21	Süper Lig	7	0	0	0	—		0	0	7	0
İstanbul Başakşehir	Total		40	3	8	1	—		10	1	58	5
Maccabi Haifa (loan)	2018–19	Israeli Premier League	16	1	—		—		—		16	1
Emmen (loan)	2019–20	Eredivisie	4	0	—		—		—		4	0
Emmen	2020–21	Eredivisie	17	0	0	0	—		1 (Note: One appearance in the Eredivisie promotion/relegation play-offs)	0	18	0
Fatih Karagümrük	2021–22	Süper Lig	10	0	0	0	—		0	0	10	0
Fatih Karagümrük	2022–23	Süper Lig	18	3	3	1	—		0	0	21	4
Fatih Karagümrük	Total		28	3	3	1	—		0	0	31	4
Manisa	2023–24	Turkish 1.Lig	0	0	0	0	—		0	0	0	0
Career total			160	12	31	6	1	0	37	3	229	21

== Honours ==
Beşiktaş J.K.

- Süper Lig: 2015–16
