= Glenn Bijl =

Dutch football player

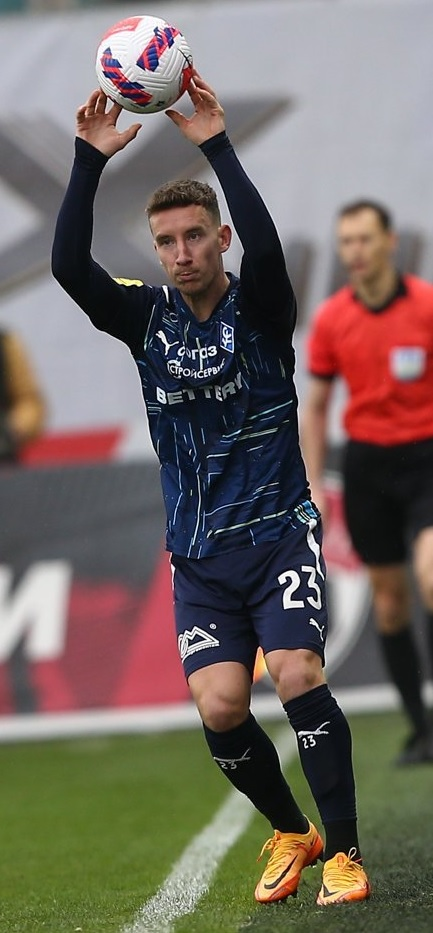
- Bijl with Krylia Sovetov in 2022

Personal information
- Date of birth: 13 July 1995 (age 31)
- Place of birth: Stadskanaal, Netherlands
- Height: 1.79 m (5 ft 10 in)
- Position: Right-back

Youth career
- –2006: SC Stadskanaal
- 2006–2015: Groningen

Senior career*
Years	Team	Apps	(Gls)
2015–2017	Groningen	1	(0)
2016	→ Dordrecht (loan)	15	(2)
2016–2017	Jong FC Groningen	16	(1)
2017–2021	Emmen	117	(7)
2021–2025	Krylia Sovetov	88	(4)
2025–2026	Antwerp	11	(0)
- * Club domestic league appearances and goals as of 23 April 2026

Glenn Bijl (born 13 July 1995) is a Dutch football player who plays as a right-back.

== Club career ==
Bijl made his professional debut in the Eerste Divisie for FC Dordrecht on 15 January 2016 in a game against FC Eindhoven.

On 12 August 2018, he scored FC Emmen's first ever goal in the Eredivisie.

On 25 August 2021, he signed a three-year contract with Russian club PFC Krylia Sovetov Samara. On 14 December 2022, Bijl extended his contract with Krylia Sovetov until 2025. He left Krylia Sovetov on 30 June 2025.

On 24 July 2025, Bijl signed a one-season contract with Antwerp in Belgium.

== Career statistics ==
As of match played 18 May 2025

Appearances and goals by club, season and competition
Club	Season	League			National cup		Continental		Other		Total	
Club	Season	Division	Apps	Goals	Apps	Goals	Apps	Goals	Apps	Goals	Apps	Goals
Groningen	2014–15	Eredivisie	0	0	0	0	0	0	—		0	0
Groningen	2015–16	Eredivisie	0	0	0	0	0	0	—		0	0
Groningen	2016–17	Eredivisie	1	0	0	0	—		1 (Note: Appearance in the European competition play-offs)	0	2	0
Groningen	Total		1	0	0	0	0	0	1	0	2	0
Dordrecht (loan)	2015–16	Eerste Divisie	15	2	—		—		—		15	2
Jong Groningen	2016–17	Derde Divisie	16	1	—		—		—		16	1
Emmen	2017–18	Eerste Divisie	31	2	1	0	—		4 (Note: Appearances in the promotion play-offs)	1	36	3
Emmen	2018–19	Eredivisie	32	2	2	3	—		—		34	5
Emmen	2019–20	Eredivisie	24	1	1	0	—		—		25	1
Emmen	2020–21	Eredivisie	30	2	3	1	—		1 (Note: Appearance in the relegation play-offs)	0	34	3
Emmen	Total		117	7	7	4	0	0	5	1	129	12
Krylia Sovetov Samara	2021–22	Russian Premier League	21	0	2	1	—		—		23	1
Krylia Sovetov Samara	2022–23	Russian Premier League	28	2	10	0	—		—		38	2
Krylia Sovetov Samara	2023–24	Russian Premier League	18	1	5	2	—		—		23	3
Krylia Sovetov Samara	2024–25	Russian Premier League	21	1	3	0	—		—		24	1
Krylia Sovetov Samara	Total		88	4	20	3	—		—		108	7
Career total			237	14	27	7	0	0	6	1	270	22
