= Lucas Bernadou =

French footballer (born 2000)

Personal information
- Date of birth: 24 September 2000 (age 26)
- Place of birth: Le Chesnay, France
- Height: 1.78 m (5 ft 10 in)
- Position: Midfielder

Team information
- Current team: Grenoble
- Number: 6

Youth career
- 2008–2013: Voisins FC
- 2013–2019: Paris Saint-Germain

Senior career*
Years	Team	Apps	(Gls)
2018–2020	Paris Saint-Germain B	28	(1)
2019–2020	Paris Saint-Germain	0	(0)
2020–2024	Emmen	112	(4)
2024–2025	Volos	18	(0)
2026–	Grenoble	15	(1)
- * Club domestic league appearances and goals as of 12 May 2026

Lucas Bernadou (born 24 September 2000) is a French professional footballer who plays as a midfielder for Ligue 2 club Grenoble.

== Career ==
=== Paris Saint-Germain ===
Bernadou is an academy graduate of Paris Saint-Germain (PSG). He was a regular for club's reserve team during 2018–19 season. Following closure of the Championnat National 2 reserve team in May 2019, Bernadou was unable to find another club, and chose to stay with PSG despite not being eligible to play for under-19 team. He was not considered by Thomas Tuchel as being part of senior team, either. He played three matches for the club's amateur reserve side in the Championnat National 3 before the competition was terminated due to COVID-19 pandemic.

=== Emmen ===
On 22 July 2020, Eredivisie club Emmen announced the signing of Bernadou on a two-year deal with option to extend for another season. He made his professional debut on 28 October in a 2–0 KNVB Cup win against FC Eindhoven, and scored his first goal in a 3–2 league loss to Utrecht on 22 December.

=== Grenoble ===
On 19 January 2026, Bernadou signed with Grenoble in Ligue 2.

== Honours ==
Emmen

- Eerste Divisie: 2021–22
