= Nick Bakker =

Dutch footballer

Personal information
- Date of birth: 21 July 1992 (age 34)
- Place of birth: Groningen, Netherlands
- Height: 1.89 m (6 ft 2 in)
- Position: Centre back

Senior career*
Years	Team	Apps	(Gls)
2011–2016	FC Groningen	6	(0)
2016–2021	FC Emmen	132	(8)
2021–2022	Heerenveen	19	(2)
2022	Al-Arabi	0	(0)
2023–2024	FC Groningen	3	(0)

International career
2013–2015	Netherlands U21	1	(0)
- * Club domestic league appearances and goals as of 10 May 2024

Nick Bakker (born 21 July 1992) is a former Dutch footballer who played as a centre back.

== Club career ==
On 19 February 2012, Bakker made his Eredivisie debut against PSV. He came as a 90+2 minute substitute for Groningen's Swedish midfielder Petter Andersson. He joined Emmen in summer 2016.

On 6 September 2021, he joined Heerenveen for the 2021–22 season.

On 4 June 2022, Bakker joined Saudi Arabian side Al-Arabi on a one-year contract. On 8 September 2022, Bakker's contract was terminated by mutual consent.

In November 2023, Bakker returned to Groningen on a short-term contract until the end of the season having been training with the club for a number of months.

== International career ==
He made his U21 debut against Ireland on 6 February 2013.

== Honours ==
Individual

- Eredivisie Team of the Month: November 2021,
