= Keziah Veendorp =

Dutch footballer (born 1997)

Personal information
- Date of birth: 17 February 1997 (age 29)
- Place of birth: Sappemeer, Netherlands
- Height: 1.87 m (6 ft 2 in)
- Positions: Defensive midfielder; centre-back

Youth career
- 2005–2006: FVV Foxhol
- 2006–2008: VV Hoogezand
- 2008–2016: Groningen

Senior career*
Years	Team	Apps	(Gls)
2016	Groningen	1	(0)
2016–2017	Jong Groningen	6	(0)
2017–2023	Emmen	158	(3)
2023–2024	Bengaluru	15	(0)
2024	Hanoi FC	1	(0)
2025	Roda JC	13	(0)

International career
2013–2014	Netherlands U17	11	(0)
2014	Netherlands U18	3	(0)
Medal record
Men's football
Representing Netherlands
UEFA European Under-17 Championship
Runner-up	2014 Malta
- * Club domestic league appearances and goals as of 9 May 2025

Keziah Veendorp (born 17 February 1997) is a Dutch professional footballer who plays as defensive midfielder or centre-back.

== Club career ==
=== Early career ===
In 2005, Veendorp started his football career with FVV Foxhol and moved to VV Hoogezand in 2006. When he came to FC Groningen is 2008.

=== Groningen ===
In 2016, Veendorp was called up for Groningen first team. He made his league debut on 20 February 2016 in a 1–4 loss against AZ Alkmaar at AFAS Stadion. In this match, he played 11 minutes, after he was substituted for Juninho Bacuna.

=== Hanoi FC ===
On 27 August 2024, Hanoi FC announced that Veendorp has joined the club. He was given the number 3 shirt.

=== Roda JC ===
On 6 January 2025, Veendorp joined Roda JC on an amateur basis. In May 2025, Roda JC confirmed that he would leave the club following the expiration of his contract at the end of the 2024–25 season.

== International career ==
On 17 October 2013, He was first called up and played for Netherlands U17 against Faroe Islands U17 In 2014, he played 2014 UEFA European Under-17 Championship as one of the key players. In the competition, he contributed as Netherlands finished as runners-up, playing 5 games.

== Career statistics ==
As of match played 9 May 2025

Appearances and goals by club, season and competition
Club	Season	League			Cup		Continental		Other		Total	
Club	Season	Division	Apps	Goals	Apps	Goals	Apps	Goals	Apps	Goals	Apps	Goals
FC Groningen	2015–16	Eredivisie	1	0	0	0	—		—		1	0
FC Groningen	2016–17	Eredivisie	0	0	0	0	—		—		0	0
FC Groningen	Total		1	0	0	0	0	0	0	0	1	0
Emmen	2017–18	Eerste Divisie	34	0	1	0	—		3 (Note: Appearances in Eredivisie promotion/relegation play-offs)	0	38	0
Emmen	2018–19	Eredivisie	28	1	2	0	—		—		30	1
Emmen	2019–20	Eredivisie	19	1	1	0	—		—		20	1
Emmen	2020–21	Eredivisie	25	0	3	0	—		1	0	29	0
Emmen	2021–22	Eerste Divisie	19	1	1	0	—		—		20	1
Emmen	2022–23	Eredivisie	33	0	3	0	—		0	0	36	0
Emmen	Total		158	3	11	0	0	0	4	0	173	3
Bengaluru	2023–24	Indian Super League	15	0	0	0	—		1 (Note: Appearance in Indian Super Cup)	0	16	0
Hanoi FC	2024–25	V.League 1	1	0	0	0	—		—		0	0
Roda JC	2024–25	Eerste Divisie	13	0	0	0	—		0	0	13	0
Total career			188	3	11	0	0	0	5	0	203	3

== Honours ==
=== Club ===
Emmen

- Eerste Divisie: 2021–22

=== International ===
Netherlands U17

- UEFA European U-17 Championship runner-up: 2014
