= Robbert de Vos =

Dutch footballer (born 1996)

Personal information
- Date of birth: 26 May 1996 (age 30)
- Place of birth: Spijkenisse, Netherlands
- Height: 1.82 m (6 ft 0 in)
- Position: Midfielder

Team information
- Current team: Barendrecht

Youth career
- VV Spijkenisse
- 2009–2015: Feyenoord
- 2015–2016: Groningen

Senior career*
Years	Team	Apps	(Gls)
2016–2018	Jong Groningen	52	(4)
2018–2021	Emmen	26	(2)
2022–	Barendrecht	7	(0)

International career
2012	Netherland U16	1	(0)
- * Club domestic league appearances and goals as of 08:03, 23 March 2023 (UTC)

Robbert de Vos (born 26 May 1996) is a Dutch professional footballer who plays as a midfielder for Derde Divisie club BVV Barendrecht.

== Professional career ==
De Vos played in his youth in VV Spijkenisse, Feyenoord and FC Groningen. He transferred to FC Emmen in 2018. De Vos made his professional debut for Emmen in a 6–0 Eredivisie loss to PSV Eindhoven on 20 October 2018, coming in as a substitute in the 71st minute for Henk Bos.

On 18 July 2022, De Vos joined Derde Divisie club BVV Barendrecht.

== International career ==
De Vos made one appearance for the Netherland U16s in 2012.
