= Nikolai Laursen =

Danish footballer (born 1998)

Personal information
- Full name: Nikolai Rohde Laursen
- Date of birth: 19 February 1998 (age 28)
- Place of birth: Vallensbæk, Denmark
- Height: 1.83 m (6 ft 0 in)
- Position: Winger

Youth career
- 2004–2015: Brøndby

Senior career*
Years	Team	Apps	(Gls)
2014–2015	Brøndby	3	(1)
2015–2019	Jong PSV	50	(11)
2018–2019	→ Brøndby (loan)	17	(1)
2019–2021	Emmen	48	(7)
2021–2025	Heracles	58	(20)
Total		176	(40)

International career
2013–2014	Denmark U16	7	(4)
2014–2015	Denmark U17	5	(0)
2016	Denmark U19	8	(4)
2017–2018	Denmark U20	4	(1)
2017–2021	Denmark U21	11	(4)
- * Club domestic league appearances and goals

Nikolai Rohde Laursen (Danish pronunciation: [ˈne̝koˌlɑjˀ ˈʁoːðə ˈlɑwˀɐsn̩]; born 19 February 1998) is a Danish former professional footballer who played as a winger.

== Club career ==
=== Early career ===
Laursen is a youth exponent from Brøndby. He made his Danish Superliga debut on 26 April 2015 at age 17 against Vestsjælland replacing Alexander Szymanowski after 84 minutes in a 4–0 home win. He scored the fourth and last goal of the game, five minutes after coming on the pitch. On 17 May, he played his second first-team game against Silkeborg. On 7 June, he played his third and final game of the 2014–15 season, against Esbjerg fB.

=== PSV ===
On 15 June 2015, Laursen signed a three-year contract with Dutch club PSV who paid a fee of around €1 million. In 2015–16 pre-season, he practiced with the first team, after which he joined Jong PSV, the reserve team. He suffered an ankle injury almost right away, which sidelined him for several months. Laursen extended his contract with PSV in February 2016 until mid-2020. He tore a cruciate ligament in a league match away against Telstar on 28 October 2016, which made him miss the entirety of the season. Laursen made his comeback on 21 August 2017, at home against De Graafschap (2–2). He made more than thirty appearances for Jong PSV during the 2017–18 season, in which he scored ten times. He was awarded the Bronze Bull in May 2018 for being the most talented player in the fourth period of the Eerste Divisie season.

Laursen was sent on a one-year loan to Brøndby on 27 June 2018 with an option to buy. After a mixed season with the club, Brøndby chose not to trigger the option, and he returned to PSV.

=== Emmen ===
Laursen signed a three-year contract with Emmen in July 2019. The club had avoided relegation from the Eredivisie the season before, and he immediately grew into a starter, making his debut on 8 August in the 0–1 home loss to Groningen.

=== Heracles Almelo ===
On 8 June 2021, it was announced that Laursen had signed a three-year contract starting 1 July with the option of an additional season with Heracles Almelo. On 22 May 2025, he formally declared his retirement from football after missing two entire seasons as a result of injuries.
