= Peter van der Vlag =

Dutch footballer and coach

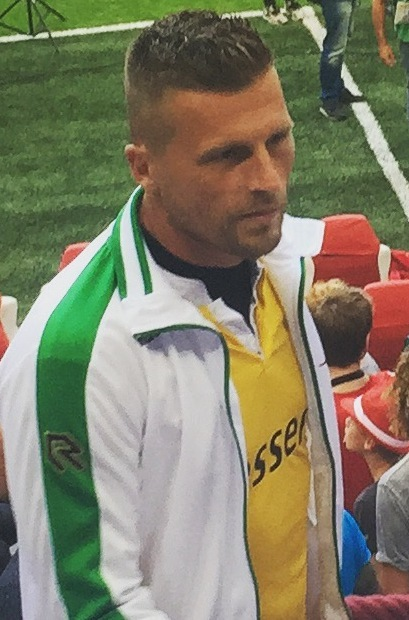
- Van der Vlag in 2015

Personal information
- Full name: Peter van der Vlag
- Date of birth: 5 December 1977 (age 48)
- Place of birth: Leeuwarden, Netherlands
- Height: 1.85 m (6 ft 1 in)
- Position: Goalkeeper

Team information
- Current team: SC Cambuur (goalkeeper coach)

Senior career*
Years	Team	Apps	(Gls)
1997–2003	SC Veendam	145	(0)
2003–2004	Go Ahead Eagles	34	(0)
2004–2009	SC Cambuur	177	(0)
2009–2011	SC Veendam	70	(0)
2011–2012	Go Ahead Eagles	32	(0)
2012–2014	FC Emmen	69	(0)
2014–2017	FC Groningen	2	(0)
2014–2017	Jong FC Groningen	7	(0)
2017–2019	FC Emmen	0	(0)
- * Club domestic league appearances and goals as of 10 June 2019

Peter van der Vlag (born 5 December 1977) is a Dutch former professional footballer who played as a goalkeeper. Later he was the goalkeeper coach of SC Cambuur.

== Career ==
Van der Vlag was born in Leeuwarden. He was part of the youth setup at amateur team, v.v. Wildervank, before turning professional with BV Veendam in the Eerste Divisie in 1997. He played 145 games for Veendam before moving to Go Ahead Eagles in 2003. After playing for Cambuur Leeuwarden between 2004 and 2009, Van der Vlag returned to his first professional club, Veendam, in 2009.

In July 2011 he re-joined his Veendam head coach Joop Gall by returning at his old club Go Ahead Eagles.

In the summer of 2012, Van der Vlag signed for FC Emmen. He left after two seasons to become second-choice goalkeeper of Eredivisie side FC Groningen.

== Coaching career ==
Van der Vlag retired at the end of the 2018–19 season and was then hired as a goalkeeper coach for his former club SC Cambuur until June 2025.
