= Ferhat Görgülü =

Dutch footballer

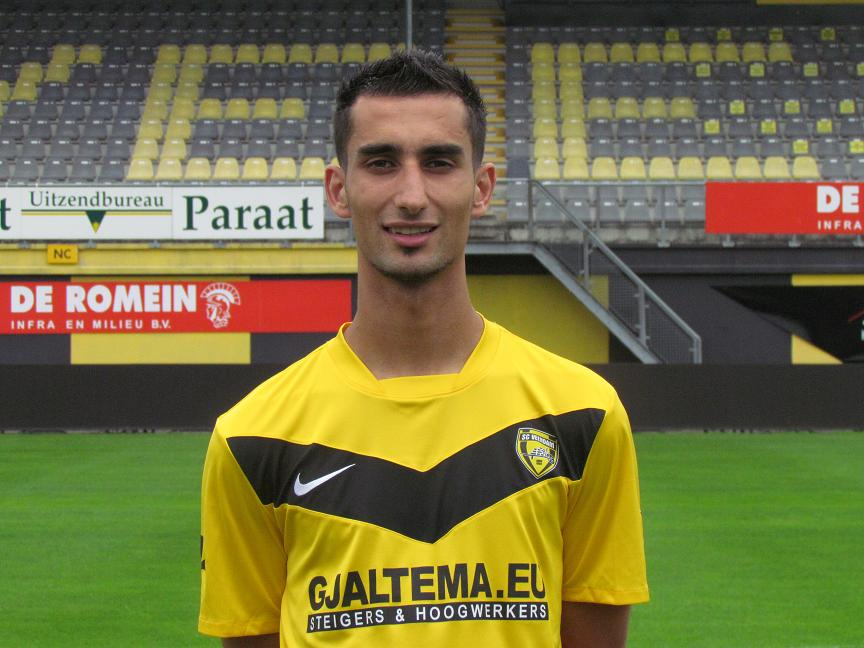

Personal information
- Date of birth: 28 October 1991 (age 35)
- Place of birth: Veendam, Netherlands
- Height: 1.84 m (6 ft 0 in)
- Position: Centre back

Youth career
- 2003–2006: Veendam 1894
- 2006–2009: Heerenveen

Senior career*
Years	Team	Apps	(Gls)
2009–2012	Veendam	13	(0)
2012–2013	FC Oss	25	(2)
2013–2017	Gençlerbirliği	20	(0)
2017–2018	Kardemir Karabükspor	6	(0)
2018–2019	Giresunspor	8	(0)
2019–2021	Emmen	4	(0)
2021–2022	Kırklarelispor	30	(0)
2022–2023	Arnavutköy Belediyespor	35	(4)
2023–2024	İnegölspor	17	(2)
2024–2025	Zwarte Leeuw	20	(0)
Total		178	(8)
- * Club domestic league appearances and goals as of 1 August 2025

Ferhat Görgülü (born 28 October 1991) is a Dutch retired footballer who last played as a defender

== Career ==
Görgülü was born in Veendam, Groningen, Netherlands to parents of Turkish origin. There, he began playing football in the youth department of Veendam in 1894 and then progressed through the academies of SC Heerenveen and BV Veendam. In the summer of 2010, he was promoted to the first team of Veendam competing in the second-tier Eerste Divisie. In his first season, Görgülü made three league appearances. He spent the first half of the 2011–12 season at Veendam, while he played the second half at FC Groningen. In the summer of 2012, he moved to FC Oss within the league. There, he quickly became a starter and made 28 league appearances in which he scored two goals by the end of the season.

After strong performances at Oss, Turkish Süper Lig club Gençlerbirliği signed Görgülü in the summer of 2013. After four years at the club, he moved to Kardemir Karabükspor in the summer of 2017 where he signed a two-year contract. A year later he went to play for Giresunspor. The following season he returned to the Netherlands, where he signed with Emmen in the Eredivisie. In September 2021, Görgülü moved to Kırklarelispor in the Turkish TFF Second League.

He retired in summer 2025 while playing for Zwarte Leeuw Rijkevorsel in the Belgian lower leagues.
