= De Oude Meerdijk =

Football stadium in Emmen, Netherlands

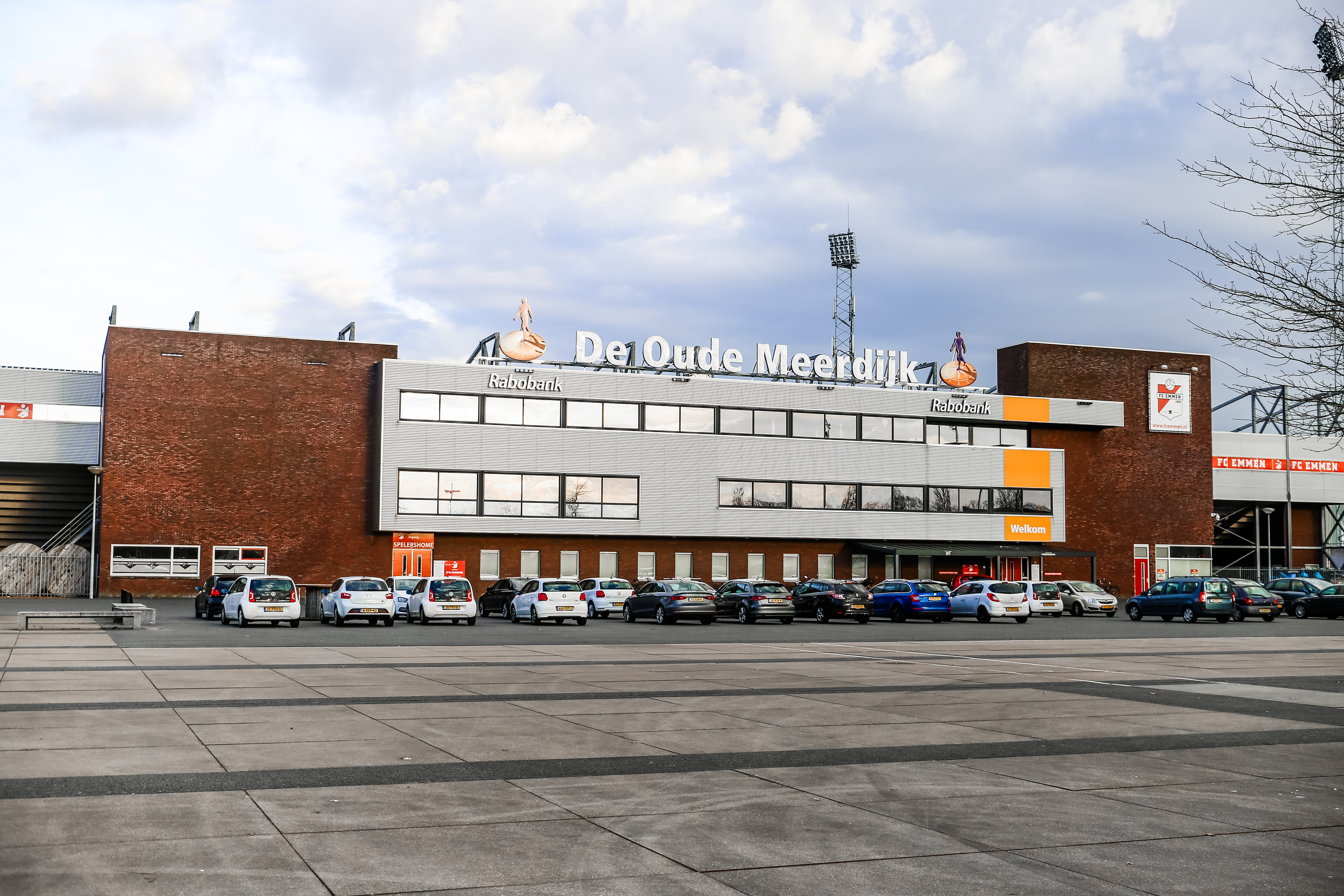
- De Oude Meerdijk
- Interactive map of De Oude Meerdijk
- Former names: Meerdijk Stadion (1977–2001); Univé Stadion (2001–2013); JENS Vesting (2013-2017)
- Location: Emmen, Drenthe, Netherlands
- Coordinates: 52°46′29″N 6°56′44″E
- Capacity: 8,600
- Surface: Natural grass (since 2025), previously artificial turf (2014–2025)

Construction
- Opened: 1977
- Renovated: 1994, 1996, 1997, 2001

Tenant
- FC Emmen

De Oude Meerdijk (Dutch pronunciation: [də ˌʌudə meːrˈdɛik]) is a football stadium with a capacity of 8,600, located in Emmen, Netherlands. The stadium was originally situated on a street called Meerdijk, from which it derived its original name: Stadion Meerdijk. Today, that section of the street is known as Stadionplein.

De Oude Meerdijk, previously known as Stadion Meerdijk (1977–2001), Univé Stadion (2001–2013), and JENS Vesting (2013–2017), is a multi-purpose stadium located at Business Park Meerdijk. It is currently used mostly for football matches and is the home stadium of FC Emmen. The stadium is able to hold 8,600 people and was built in 1977. It was completely renovated in 2001. Between 2001 and 2013 the stadium carried the sponsored name Univé Stadion for twelve seasons. From 2014 to 2017 it was known as the JENS Vesting due to another sponsorship deal.

== History ==
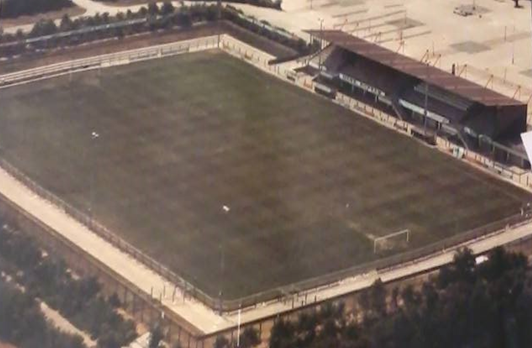
The stadium in the late 1980s, with only a single stand and elevated terraces.

The stadium was officially opened on 27 August 1977. In front of 6,500 spectators amateur club vv Emmen defeated CVV Germanicus with a score of 3–1. At the time, the stadium had a total capacity of 12,000 and featured a single seated stand with elevated standing terraces on the other sides. There was no professional football being played in Emmen yet. This would begin in 1985. During a promotion/relegation play-offs match against SC Heerenveen in 1990 a record attendance of 12,000 spectators filled the stadium.

In the early 1990s the KNVB announced that, starting from the year 2000, all football stadiums in the Netherlands would be required to consist exclusively of seated areas. As a result, various plans were proposed to increase the number of seats. One option involved building a new stadium elsewhere in Emmen but this never materialized. Instead, the existing stadium was renovated on four occasions (in 1994, 1996, 1997 and 2001) eventually resulting in a fully seated venue with a capacity of 8,600 covered seats.

In 2005 the stadium hosted six group stage matches and two round of 16 matches during the 2005 FIFA U-20 World Cup. To meet FIFA standards, several upgrades were carried out, including the removal of fences and the installation of a new floodlighting system. In 2011, the stadium was one of the host stadiums for the 2011 CPISRA Football 7-a-side World Championships.

== Construction and Layout ==
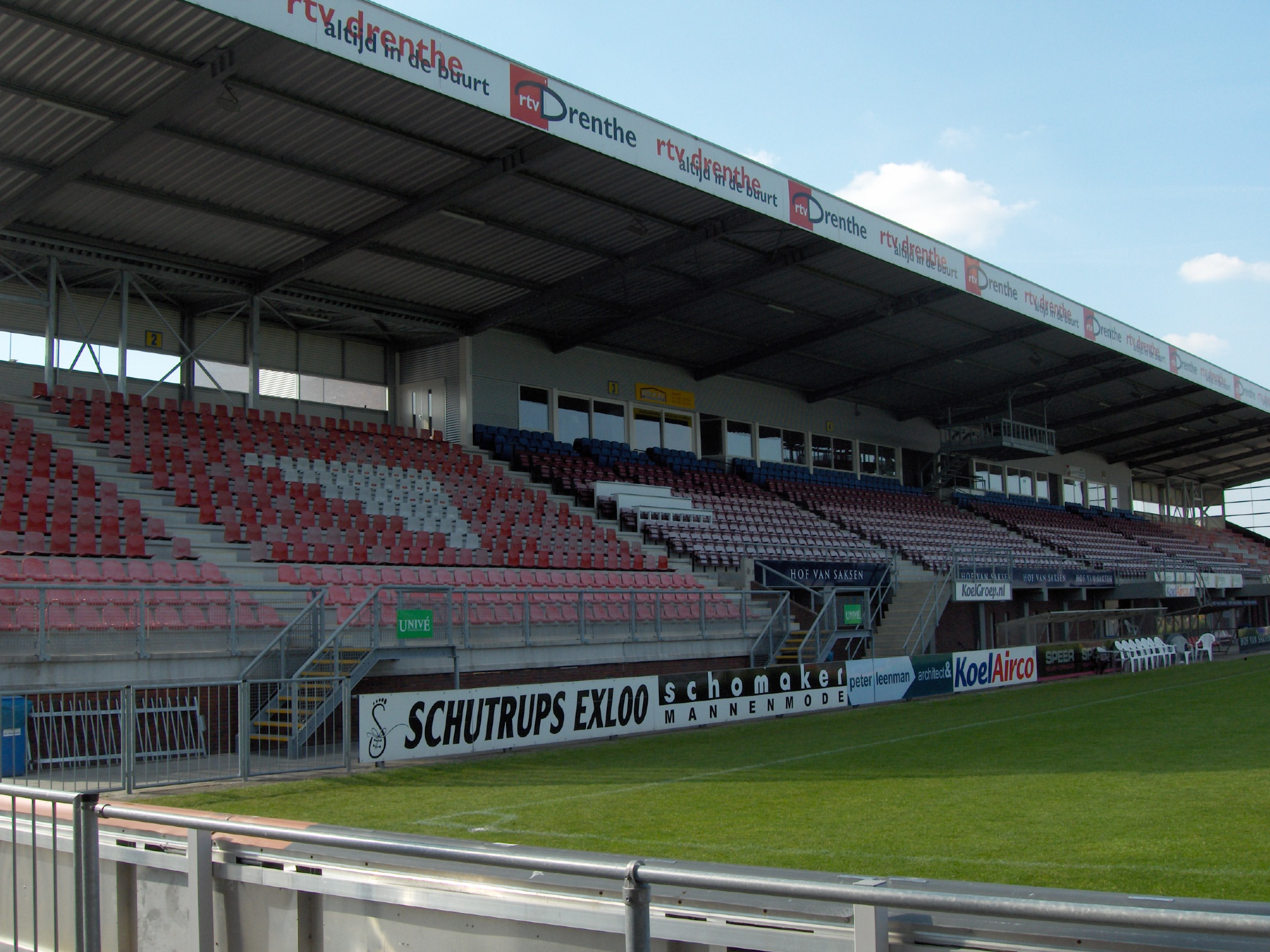
Main stand.

=== Main Stand ===
- Built: 1977
- Renovated and expanded: 2001
- Capacity: approx. 2,250 seats

The main stand is located on the west side of the pitch along Stadionplein. When it was built in 1977 the stand had around 1,000 seats and was the only seated area in the stadium. In 2001 it was renovated and expanded. It features red brick and light-colored aluminum symbolizing the club colors. The building houses offices, dressing rooms, a restaurant, sponsor areas, the FC Emmen Museum, press room, fitness room, camera platform, and five skyboxes. The stand is primarily used for sponsors and also includes the press area.

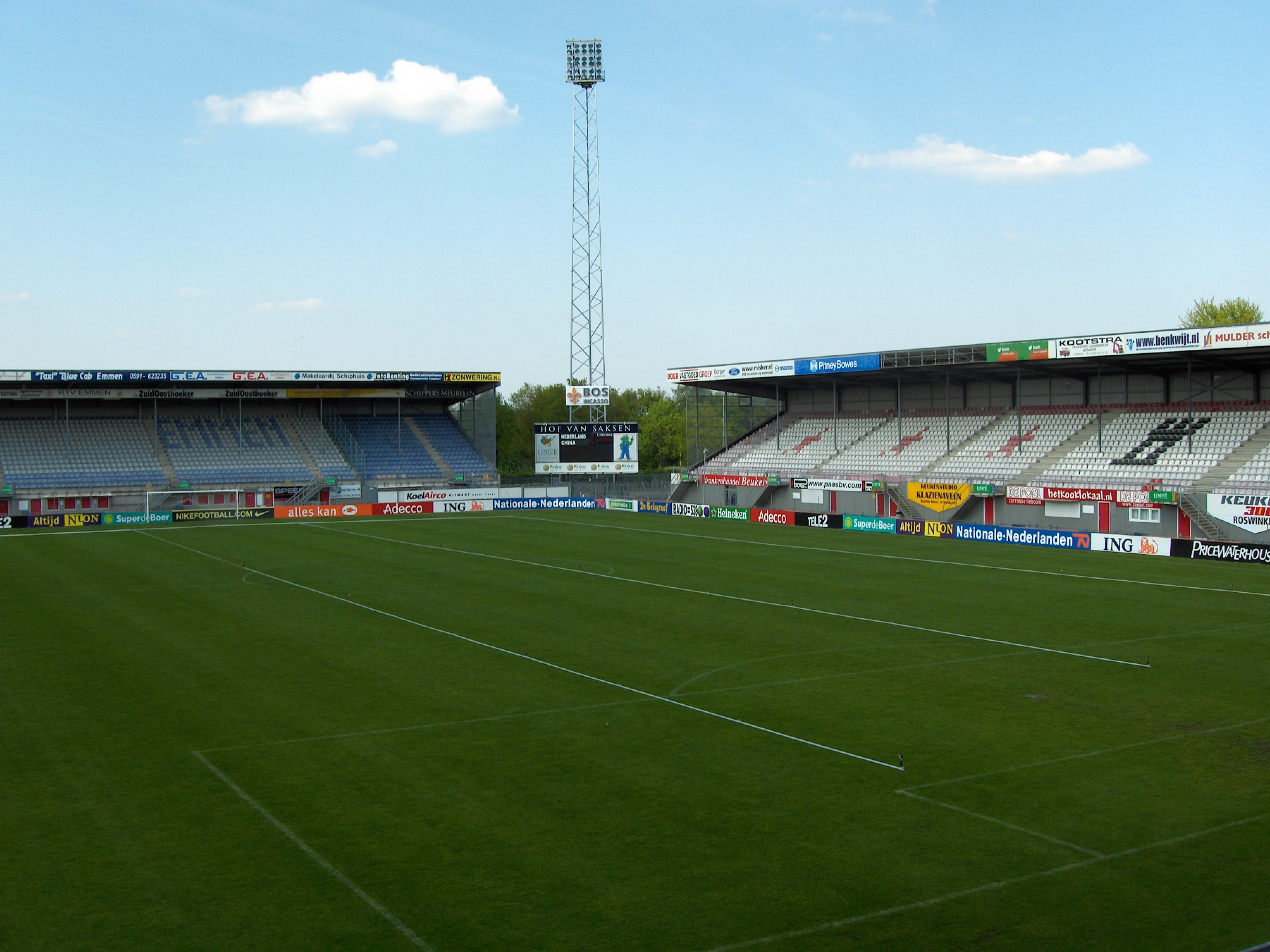
North and East stands.

=== North Stand ===
- Built: 1997
- Capacity: approx. 1,825 seats

The north side of the stadium was the last to be converted from uncovered standing terraces to covered seating. The eastern section of the stand contains the away section with approximately 400 seats.

=== East Stand ===
- Built: 1993
- Renovated and expanded: 2001
- Capacity: approx. 2,775 seats

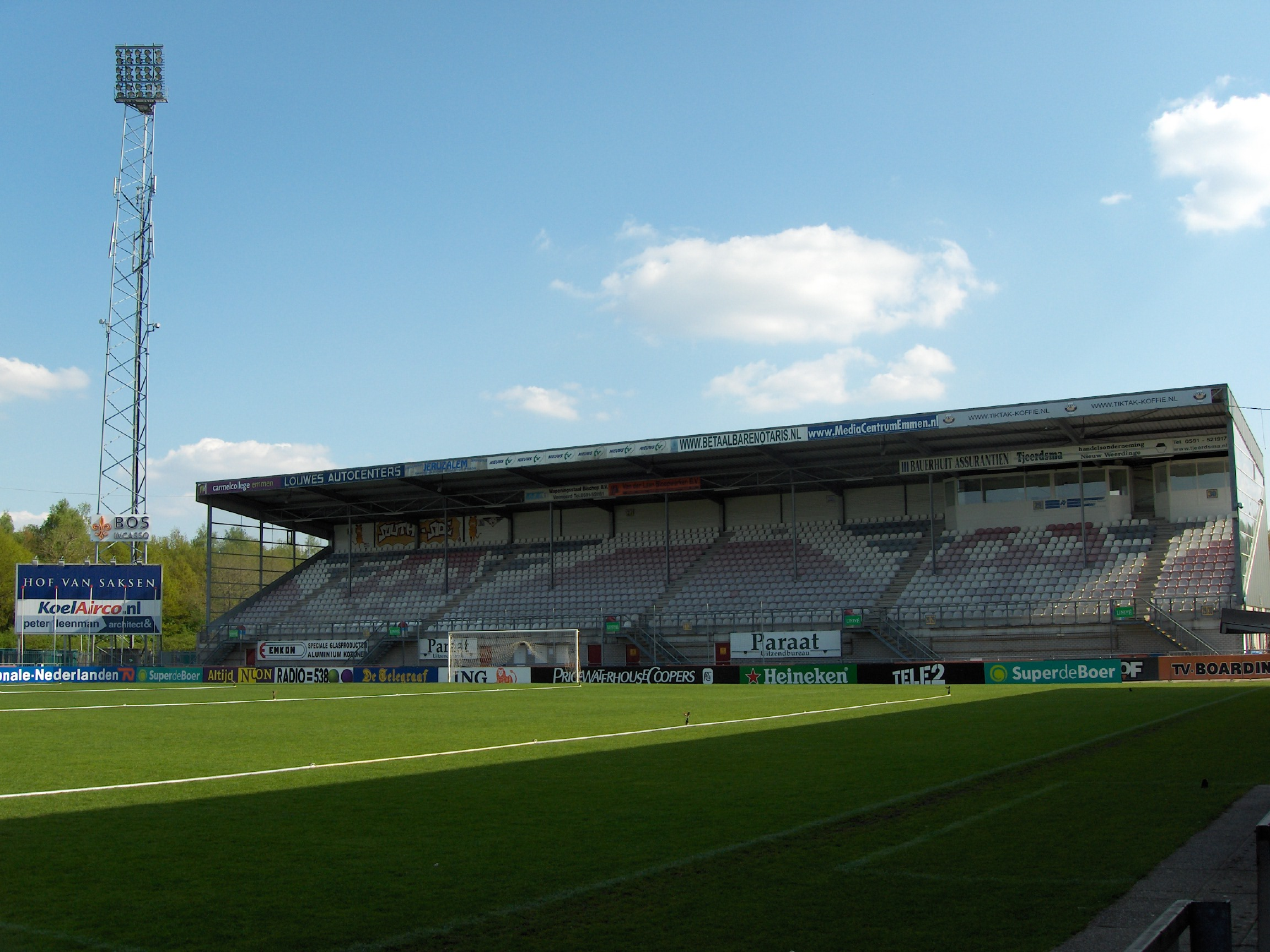
Jan van Beveren Stand.

The first stand on the east side of the pitch was a temporary structure built in 1992, which was destroyed in the same year by a severe storm. A permanent stand was completed in November 1993 with 997 seats. Standing areas remained on both sides of the stand until 2001 when renovations and expansions eliminated them. A supporters' home was added beneath the stand. The seat pattern incorporates the Drenthe flag, which is why it's sometimes called the Drenthe Stand, though the official name remains East Stand.

=== Jan van Beveren Stand ===
- Built: 1996
- Capacity: 1,767 seats

This stand is located on the south side of the pitch. Since its completion sections 25 and 26 on the eastern end have been home to FC Emmen's most passionate supporters. The stadium's control room is located on the western side. Beneath the stand is a sports hall. The seat pattern includes two depictions of Emmen's old triangular logo. On 2 August 2015 the stand was officially named after the late Jan van Beveren who began his career in Emmen.

=== Stadium Lighting ===
In the 1980s and early 1990s the stadium lacked proper floodlighting. Eight low masts lined the long sides of the field, providing a horizontal illuminance of just 350 lux, which was below the KNVB standard for evening matches.

In 1992, at the corners of the stadium, 42-meter high masts were installed each fitted with 30 metal halide floodlights. This upgrade brought the total to 120 fixtures and increased the horizontal illuminance to about 750 lux. The system debuted during halftime of a friendly match against FC Barcelona on 5 August 1992.

In 2005 the lighting was upgraded again with 120 metal halide fixtures, boosting illuminance to 1,400 lux to meet FIFA standards for international TV broadcasts.

In 2018 the system was converted to LED lighting by Dutch manufacturer AAA-LUX. The LED setup consists of 96 WS-STAD Gen-6 fixtures and provides approximately 1,400 lux of horizontal illuminance. In November 2020 a software upgrade enabled light shows during player entrances and goal celebrations. The feature was first used in league play on 5 March 2021 during FC Emmen – Sparta Rotterdam.

== Gallery ==
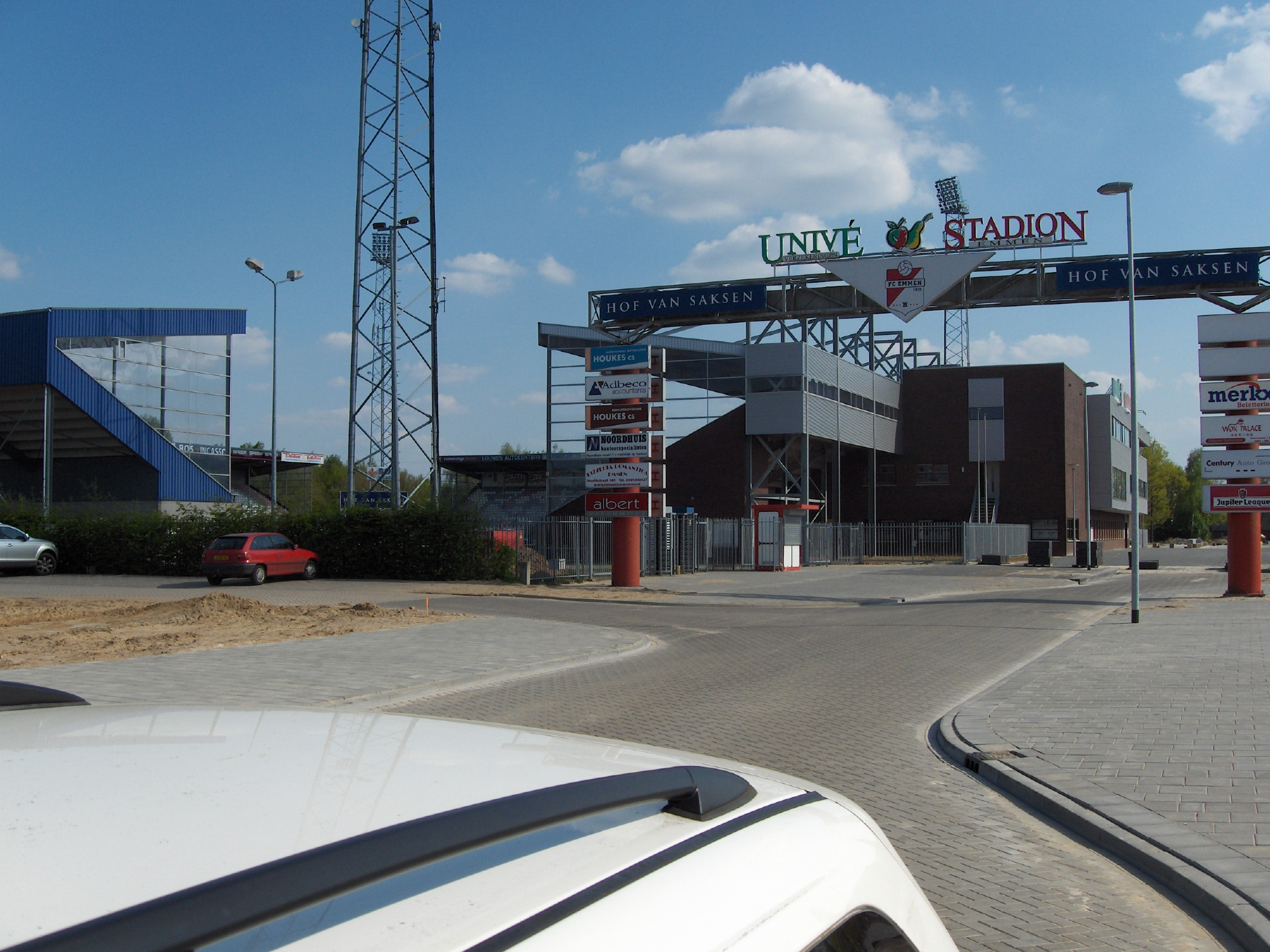
Entrance

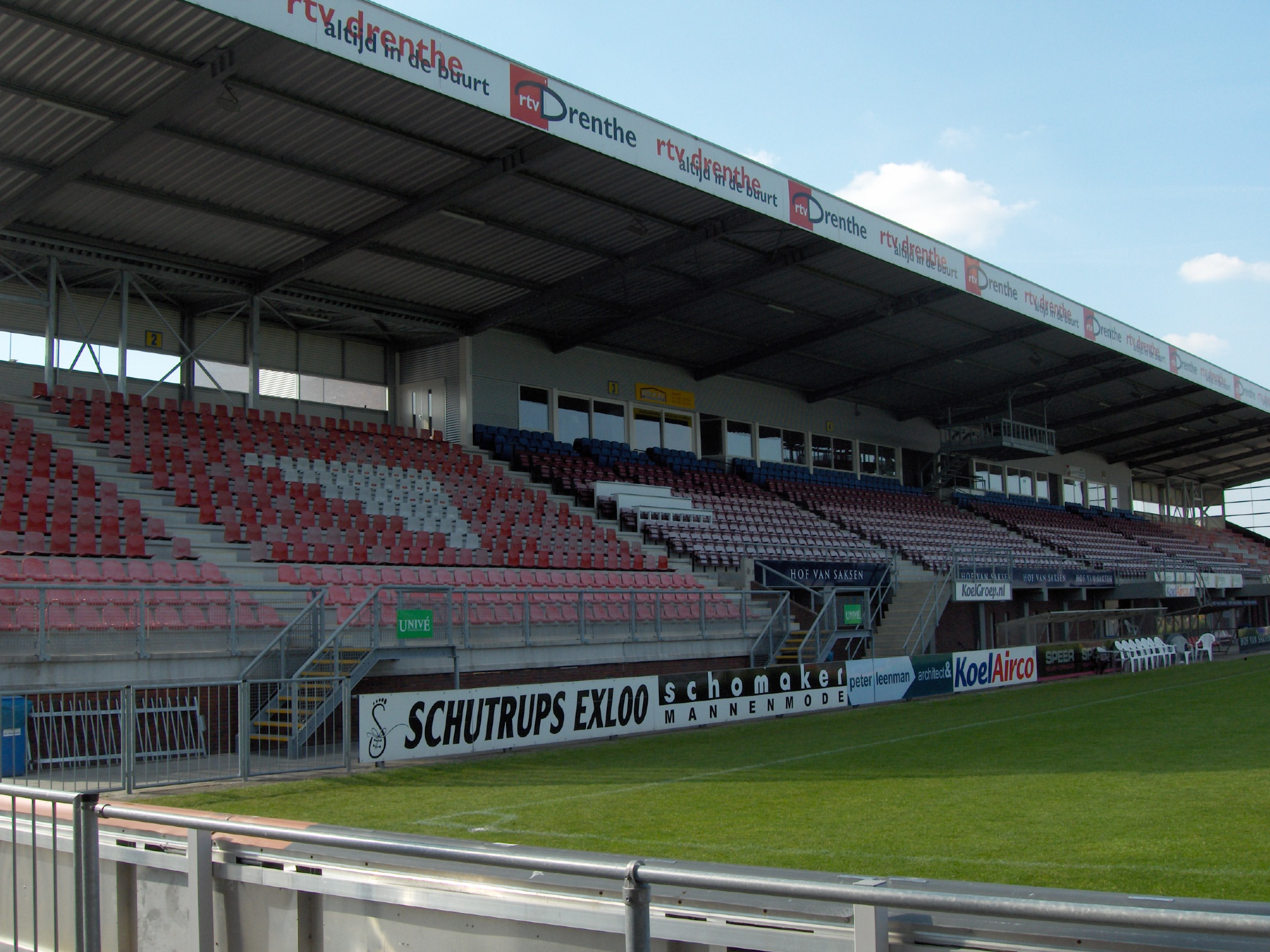
Main stand

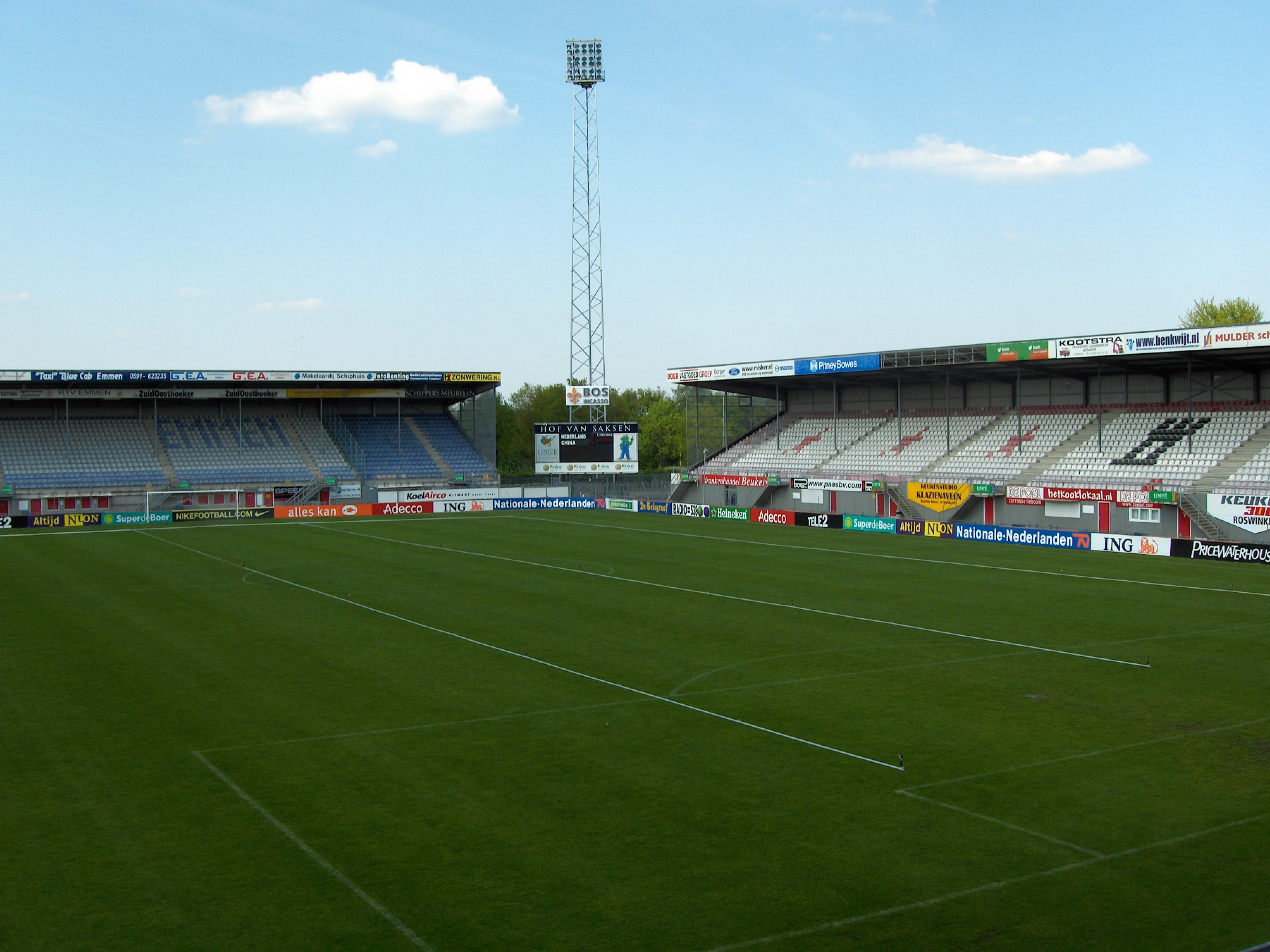
North- and East stands

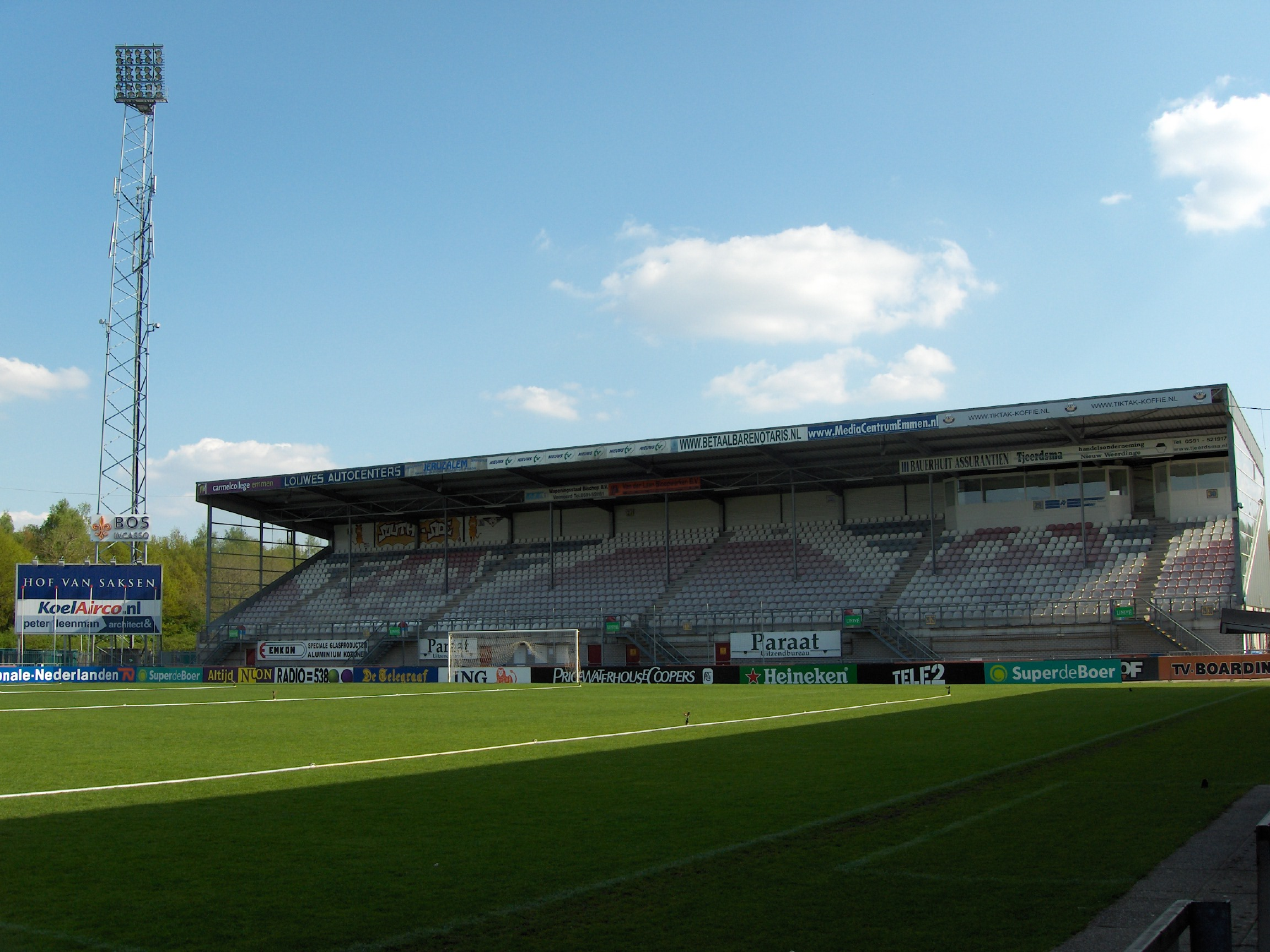
South stand

=== Panorama ===
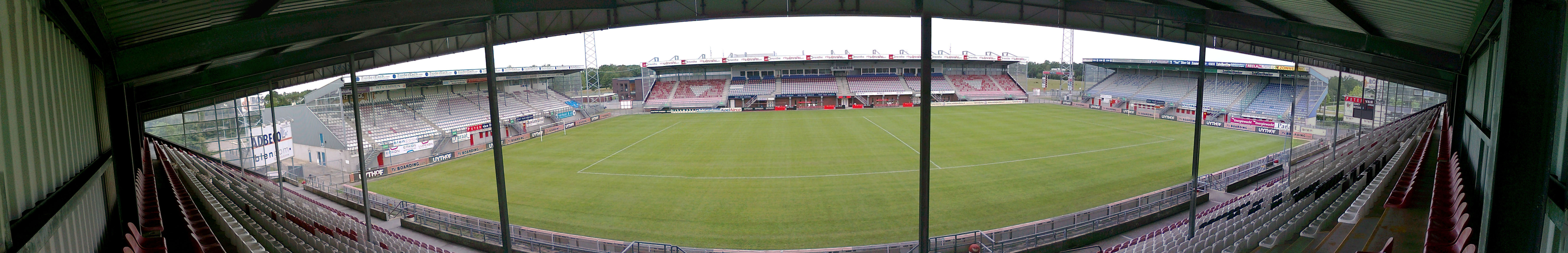
