= Stefan van der Lei =

Dutch footballer

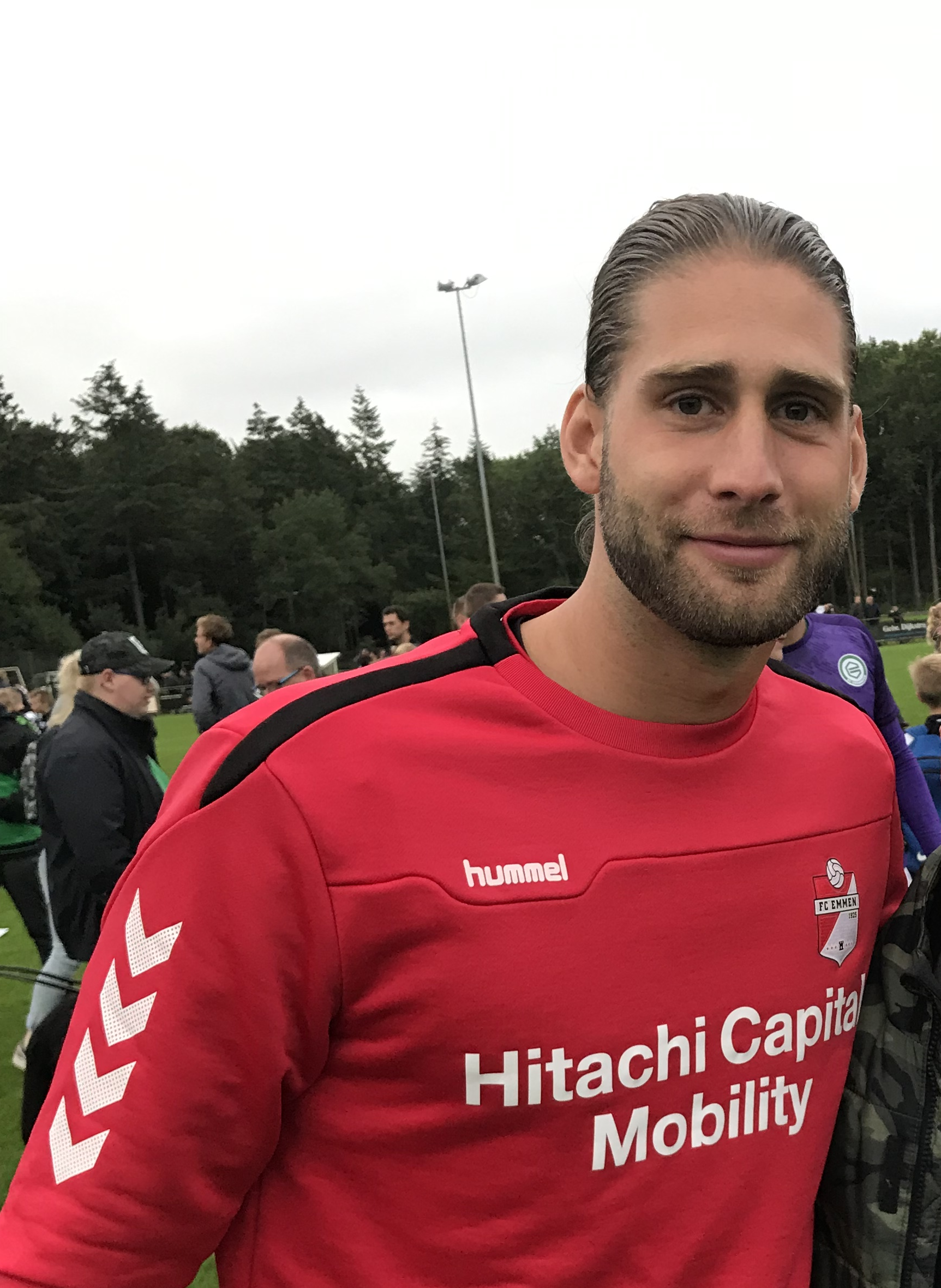
- Van Der Lei with FC Emmen in 2019

Personal information
- Date of birth: 5 March 1993 (age 33)
- Place of birth: Groningen, Netherlands
- Height: 1.92 m (6 ft 3 1/2 in)
- Position: Goalkeeper

Team information
- Current team: Hoogeveen
- Number: 22

Youth career
- vv helpman
- Groningen

Senior career*
Years	Team	Apps	(Gls)
2013–2017	Groningen	0	(0)
2014–2015	→ Emmen (loan)	0	(0)
2017–2018	Willem II	0	(0)
2018–2019	Dalkurd FF	1	(0)
2019–2021	Emmen	0	(0)
2021–2024	VV Pelikaan-S		
2024–2025	VV DZOH Emmen		
2025–	Hoogeveen	0	(0)

International career
2013	Netherlands U21	1	(0)
- * Club domestic league appearances and goals as of 11 January 2026

Stefan van der Lei (born 5 March 1993) is a Dutch footballer who plays as a goalkeeper for Hoogeveen.

== Career ==
In 2018, Van der Lei played for Dalkurd FF in Sweden.
