= Caner Cavlan =

Dutch footballer (born 1992)

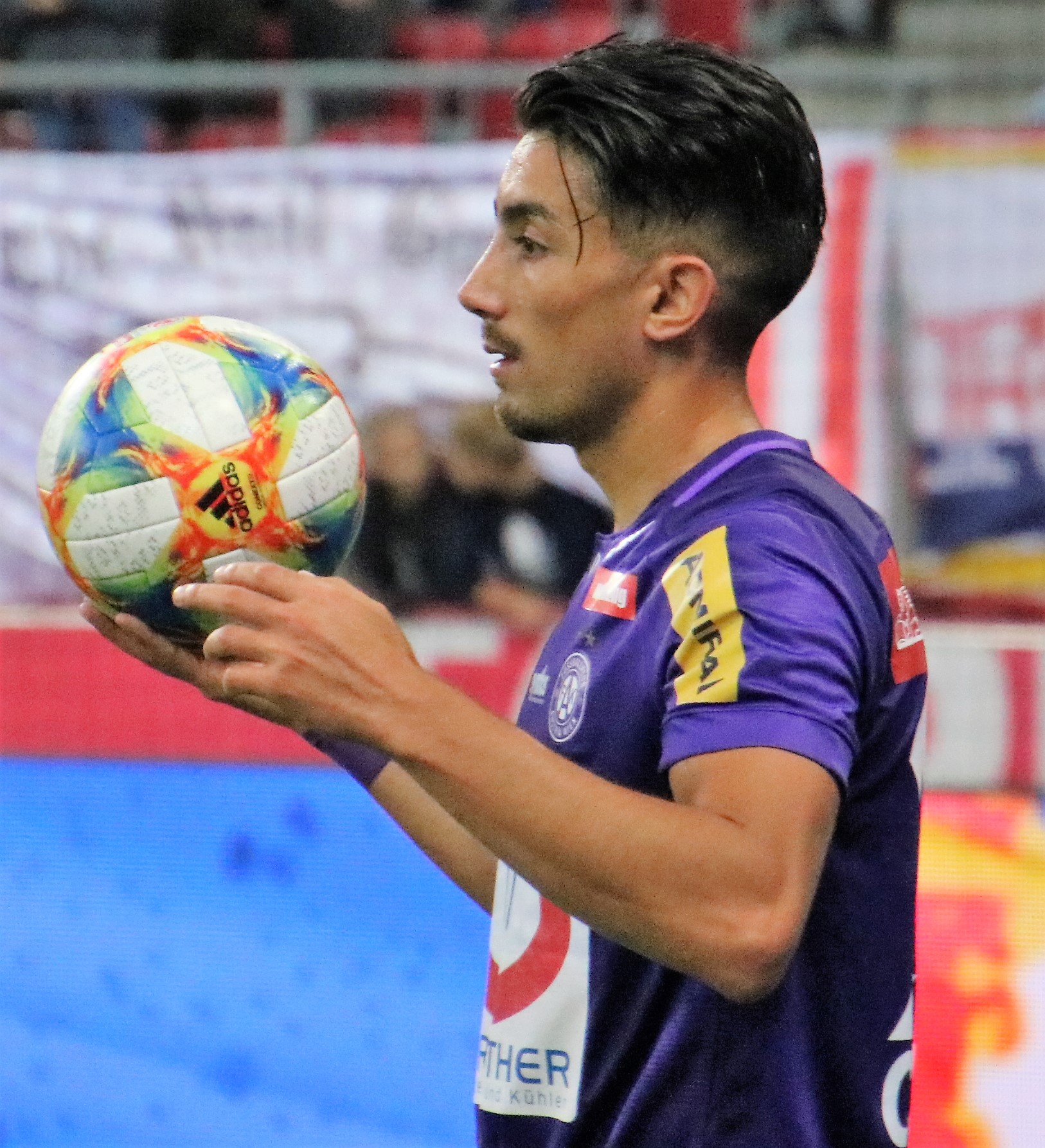
- Cavlan with Austria Wien in 2019

Personal information
- Date of birth: 5 February 1992 (age 34)
- Place of birth: Doetinchem, Netherlands
- Height: 1.75 m (5 ft 9 in)
- Position: Left-back

Team information
- Current team: Aliağa FK
- Number: 39

Youth career
- VV Doetinchem
- DZC '68
- De Graafschap

Senior career*
Years	Team	Apps	(Gls)
2011–2015	De Graafschap	47	(7)
2015–2018	Heerenveen	38	(1)
2017	→ Şanlıurfaspor	12	(1)
2017–2018	→ Boluspor	11	(1)
2018–2019	Emmen	34	(4)
2019–2020	Austria Wien	7	(0)
2020–2021	Emmen	33	(0)
2021–2023	Bandırmaspor	54	(2)
2023–2026	Iğdır	58	(3)
2026	Serikspor	10	(0)
2026–	Aliağa FK	1	(0)
- * Club domestic league appearances and goals as of 1 October 2026

Caner Cavlan (born 5 February 1992) is a Dutch professional footballer who plays as a left-back for TFF 2. Lig club Aliağa FK. Besides the Netherlands, he has played in Turkey and Austria.

== Club career ==
Cavlan is known for his passing skills. Cavlan also is a free-kick specialist. He made his debut for De Graafschap in the away game versus AZ replacing Sjoerd Overgoor as a second-half substitute. He moved to Heerenveen in summer 2015.

Heerenveen loaned him to Turkish second division side Şanlıurfaspor in January 2017.

On 18 June 2021, he returned to Turkey and signed a two-year contract with Bandırmaspor.

== Personal life ==
Born in the Netherlands, Cavlan is of Turkish descent.
