= Michael de Leeuw =

Dutch footballer (born 1986)

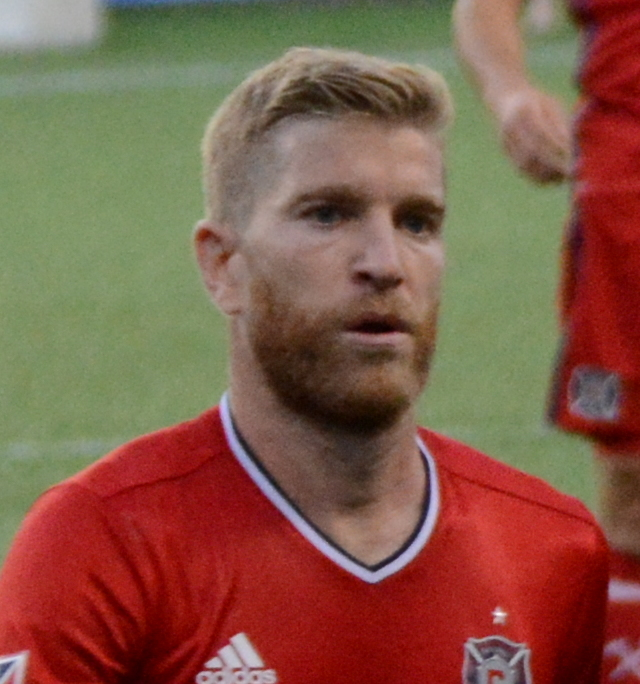
- De Leeuw with Chicago Fire in 2017

Personal information
- Full name: Michael Jeroen Maarten Michiel de Leeuw
- Date of birth: 7 October 1986 (age 40)
- Place of birth: Goirle, Netherlands
- Height: 1.78 m (5 ft 10 in)
- Position: Forward

Youth career
- DWC
- RKTVV Tilburg
- 2007–2009: Willem II

Senior career*
Years	Team	Apps	(Gls)
2009–2011	Veendam	67	(38)
2011–2012	De Graafschap	33	(10)
2012–2016	Groningen	111	(48)
2016–2018	Chicago Fire	57	(12)
2019–2021	Emmen	71	(25)
2021–2022	Groningen	31	(4)
2022–2024	Willem II	61	(10)
2024–2025	Cambuur	27	(5)
Total		456	(137)
- * Club domestic league appearances and goals

Michael Jeroen Maarten Michiel de Leeuw (born 7 October 1986) is a Dutch former professional footballer who played as a forward.

== Career ==
Born in Goirle, De Leeuw began his career at amateur clubs DWC and RKTVV before joining the youth department of Willem II. He never broke through to the first team, and therefore chose to play for BV Veendam in the Dutch second division.

=== Veendam ===
De Leeuw was placed as a striker in his first year for Veendam, and he was an immediate success, scoring 25 goals in 36 league matches. At the end of the year, he won the topscorer award and the award for 'Talent of the Year', for the most talented player of the season. He was chased by several clubs in the Eredivisie and clubs abroad, but in the end chose to stay in Veendam.

=== Groningen ===
On 22 May 2012, FC Groningen announced that they had signed De Leeuw. He helped the club win the KNVB Cup in 2014–15 against defending champions PEC Zwolle. It was their first major trophy and they qualified for the UEFA Europa League.

=== Chicago Fire ===
On 17 May 2016, the Chicago Fire announced they have signed De Leeuw to a three-year deal through 2018 with a club option for 2019.

In his first season with Chicago, De Leeuw contributed seven goals and three assists across 17 games. In his second season with Chicago, de Leeuw's role switched to supporting striker behind Nemanja Nikolić, who led the league in scoring in 2017. In his new role, De Leeuw contributed a career high eight assists along with three goals. His season was cut short by a ruptured ACL injury suffered against New York City FC on 30 September 2017. De Leeuw was released by Chicago at the end of their 2018 season.

=== Emmen ===
On 31 December 2018, De Leeuw signed a one-and-a-half-year deal with FC Emmen with an option for an additional year.

=== Return to Groningen ===
On 26 March 2021, De Leeuw returned to Groningen when he signed a contract for the 2021–22 season. On 26 October, he scored his first goal back with the team in a 2–0 victory over AZ.

=== Return to Willem II ===
On 10 August 2022, De Leeuw returned to his youth club Willem II on a two-year contract. He helped the Tricolores to the Eerste Divisie title in the 2023–24 season, which meant promotion back to the Eredivisie.

=== Cambuur ===
On 11 June 2024, De Leeuw signed a one-year contract with Cambuur. In May 2025, he announced his retirement from professional football, concluding a 16-year playing career. His final appearance came in a 1–1 draw against Den Bosch in the promotion play-offs, which resulted in a 2–1 aggregate defeat. De Leeuw was brought on in the 113th minute.

== Career statistics ==
Appearances and goals by club, season and competition
Club	Season	League			Cup		Continental		Other		Total	
Club	Season	Division	Apps	Goals	Apps	Goals	Apps	Goals	Apps	Goals	Apps	Goals
BV Veendam	2009–10	Eerste Divisie	36	25	1	0	0	0	—		37	25
BV Veendam	2010–11	Eerste Divisie	31	13	2	0	0	0	1 (Note: Appearance(s) in Eredivisie promotion/relegation playoffs)	1	34	14
BV Veendam	Total		67	38	3	0	0	0	1	1	71	39
De Graafschap	2011–12	Eredivisie	33	10	2	1	0	0	2	0	37	11
Groningen	2012–13	Eredivisie	30	11	3	1	0	0	2 (Note: Appearances in Eredivisie European play-offs)	0	35	12
Groningen	2013–14	Eredivisie	24	9	3	0	0	0	4	0	31	9
Groningen	2014–15	Eredivisie	28	17	4	7	1 (Note: Appearance(s) in UEFA Europa League)	0	0	0	33	24
Groningen	2015–16	Eredivisie	27	9	3	1	4	0	2 (Note: One appearance in Johan Cruyff Shield, one appearance in Eredivisie European play-offs)	0	34	10
Groningen	Total		109	46	13	9	5	0	8	0	135	55
Chicago Fire	2016	MLS	18	7	2	1	0	0	0	0	20	8
Chicago Fire	2017	MLS	30	3	1	0	0	0	0	0	31	3
Chicago Fire	2018	MLS	9	2	0	0	0	0	0	0	9	2
Chicago Fire	Total		57	12	3	1	0	0	0	0	60	13
Emmen	2018–19	Eredivisie	16	3	0	0	—		—		16	3
Emmen	2019–20	Eredivisie	26	9	1	1	—		—		27	10
Emmen	2020–21	Eredivisie	29	13	2	2	—		1	0	32	15
Emmen	Total		71	25	3	3	—		1	0	75	28
Groningen	2021–22	Eredivisie	31	4	2	1	—		—		33	5
Willem II	2022–23	Eerste Divisie	33	7	1	0	—		0	0	34	7
Willem II	2023–24	Eerste Divisie	28	3	2	0	—		—		30	3
Willem II	Total		61	10	3	0	—		0	0	64	10
Cambuur	2024–25	Eerste Divisie	27	5	2	0	—		2	0	29	5
Career total			456	137	31	15	5	0	14	1	506	153

== Honours ==
Groningen

- KNVB Cup: 2014–15

Willem II

- Eerste Divisie: 2023–24

Individual

- Eredivisie Team of the Month: March 2022
