= Hilal Ben Moussa =

Dutch-Moroccan footballer

Personal information
- Date of birth: 22 May 1992 (age 34)
- Place of birth: Utrecht, Netherlands
- Height: 1.80 m (5 ft 11 in)
- Position: Midfielder

Team information
- Current team: Scherpenzeel

Senior career*
Years	Team	Apps	(Gls)
2011–2015	Groningen	2	(0)
2015–2016	Volendam	17	(1)
2017–2019	Emmen	54	(1)
2019	Sepsi Sfântu Gheorghe	1	(0)
2020–2021	Emmen	30	(0)
2022	Apollon Larissa		
2023–2024	DVS '33	39	(1)
2024–	Scherpenzeel		
- * Club domestic league appearances and goals as of 27 January 2023

Hilal Ben Moussa (born 22 May 1992) is a Dutch professional footballer who plays as a midfielder for Scherpenzeel. He also holds Moroccan citizenship.

== Club career ==
Ben Moussa was promoted to the senior team of FC Groningen in 2011. He did not make any appearance in that season. He made his debut for The Green-White Army on 2 February 2013 coming as a 90+2 minute substitute for Género Zeefuik against AZ. He joined Volendam on non-professional terms in September 2015.

In January 2023, Ben Moussa signed for Derde Divisie club DVS '33 on a contract until the end of the season.
