= 2020–21 Excelsior Rotterdam season =

Dutch football club season

Excelsior Rotterdam
2020–21 season
- Stadium: Van Donge & De Roo Stadion
- Eerste Divisie: 9th
- KNVB Cup: QF
- Top goalscorer: League: Elías Már Ómarsson (18 goals); All: Elías Már Ómarsson (21 goals)
- Biggest win: 6-1 Jong PSV (a) 1st week
- Biggest defeat: 7-2 (SC Cambuur (a) 32nd week)
- All statistics correct as of 13 October 2025.

The 2020–21 season was Excelsior Rotterdam's 30th season in the Eerste Divisie (2nd consecutive). The club concluded the season in 9th place.

The club also competed in the KNVB Cup, where they were eliminated in the quarter final following a 1–0 defeat to SBV Vitesse.

Elías Már Ómarsson was the top scorer of the club in this season with 21 goals; 18 goals in Eerste Divisie and 3 goals in KVNB Cup.

Elías Már Ómarsson and Siebe Horemans were the most appeared players in this season with 42 appearances; 38 appearances in the Eerste Divisie and 4 appearances in the KNVB Cup.

== Players ==
=== First-team squad ===
Note: Flags indicate national team as defined under FIFA eligibility rules; some limited exceptions apply. Players may hold more than one non-FIFA nationality.

No.	Pos.	Nation	Player
1	GK	NED	Alessandro Damen
2	DF	BEL	Siebe Horemans
3	DF	BEL	Hervé Matthys
4	DF	NED	Thomas Oude Kotte
5	DF	NED	Robin van der Meer
6	DF	NED	Abdallah Aberkane
7	FW	NED	Stijn Meijer
8	MF	NED	Mats Wieffer
9	FW	ISL	Elías Már Ómarsson
10	MF	NED	Luigi Bruins
11	FW	NED	Joël Zwarts
14	MF	MAR	Redouan El Hankouri
15	DF	NOR	Sondre Skogen
16	DF	NED	Sander Fischer

No.	Pos.	Nation	Player
17	FW	NED	Thomas Verhaar
18	FW	GNB	Ahmad Mendes Moreira
20	FW	BEL	Dylan Seys
21	MF	NED	Niek den Heeten
22	FW	NED	Reuven Niemeijer
23	GK	NED	Maarten de Fockert
24	DF	ENG	Brandon Ormonde-Ottewill
25	MF	NED	Joshua Eijgenraam
26	MF	NED	Mitchell van Rooijen
27	FW	NED	Delano Gouda
28	DF	IND	Nathan Tjoe-A-On
31	DF	NED	Dave van Delft
33	MF	NED	Julian Baas
40	DF	NED	Jaimy Buter

== Transfers ==
=== In ===
Pos.	Player	Transferred from	Fee	Date
MF	(Netherlands) Mats Wieffer	(Netherlands) FC Twente/Heracles Almelo (U21)	Free	1 July 2020
DF	(England) Brandon Ormonde-Ottewill	(Netherlands) FC Dordrecht		3 July 2020
MF	(Netherlands) Reuven Niemeijer	(Netherlands) Heracles Almelo	Free	16 July 2020
MF	(Netherlands) Mitchell van Rooijen	(Netherlands) FC Utrecht	On loan	4 August 2020
GK	(Netherlands) Lars Bleijenberg	(Netherlands) Royal Antwerp F.C. (U21)	Free	11 August 2020
FW	(Belgium) Dylan Seys	(Belgium) Royal Excel Mouscron	Free	3 October 2020
DF	(Norway) Sondre Skogen	(Netherlands) Feyenoord (U21)	On loan	31 January 2021

=== Out ===
Pos.	Player	Transferred to	Fee	Date
DF	(England) Cameron Humphreys	(Belgium) SV Zulte Waregem	End of loan	30 June 2020
FW	(Netherlands) Arsenio Valpoort	(Netherlands) FC Dordrecht	Free	1 July 2020
MF	(Netherlands) Kyle Ebecilio	Without club		1 July 2020
MF	(Netherlands) Rai Vloet	(Netherlands) Heracles Almelo	Free	1 July 2020
FW	(Netherlands) Stijn Meijer	Without club		24 March 2021

== Competitions ==
=== Overall record ===
Competition	First match	Last match	Starting round	Final position	Record							
Competition	First match	Last match	Starting round	Final position	Pld	W	D	L	GF	GA	GD	Win %
Eredivisie	29 August 2020	12 May 2021	Week 1	9th	38	14	6	18	65	66	−1	36.84
KNVB Cup	26 October 2020	9 February 2021	1st round	Quarter final	4	2	1	1	8	3	+5	50.00
Total					42	16	7	19	73	69	+4	38.10

Source: ESPN

=== Eerste Divisie ===
==== League table ====
Pos	Team	Pld	W	D	L	GF	GA	GD	Pts	Promotion or qualification
7	N.E.C. (O, P)	38	20	6	12	68	45	+23	66	Qualification to promotion play-offs
8	Roda JC Kerkrade	38	15	12	11	67	61	+6	57	Qualification to promotion play-offs
9	Excelsior	38	14	6	18	65	66	−1	48	
10	TOP Oss	38	13	8	17	40	57	−17	47	
11	MVV Maastricht	38	13	7	18	50	72	−22	46	

Source: Soccerway, Keuken Kampioen Divisie (in Dutch)
Rules for classification: Season in progress: 1) Most points won; 2) Less points lost; 3) Goal difference; 4) Goals scored; 5) Alphabetical order; End of season: 1) Points; 2) Goal difference; 3) Goals scored; 4) Head-to-head points; 5) Head-to-head goal difference; 6) Head-to-head away goals scored; 7) Play-off if relevant for deciding champion, relegation or participating in a European league, otherwise by draw. 8) Penalty shoot-out (only after a play-off)
(O) Play-off winners; (P) Promoted

==== Results summary ====
Overall								Home						Away					
Pld	W	D	L	GF	GA	GD	Pts	W	D	L	GF	GA	GD	W	D	L	GF	GA	GD
38	14	6	18	65	66	−1	48	8	2	9	35	31	+4	6	4	9	30	35	−5

Source: https://www.espn.nl/voetbal/stand/_/competitie/NED.1/season/2020

==== Results by round ====
Round	1	2	3	4	5	6	7	8	9	10	11	12	13	14	15	16	17	18	19	20	21	22	23	24	25	26	27	28	29	30	31	32	33	34	35	36	37	38
Ground	A	H	A	H	A	H	A	H	A	A	H	A	H	A	H	A	H	H	A	H	A	H	A	H	A	H	A	H	A	H	H	A	H	A	A	H	A	H
Result	W	L	W	L	L	L	D	W	W	W	W	L	W	L	L	L	L	L	L	W	W	D	W	L	L	W	L	W	D	L	D	L	W	D	W	W	L	L
Position																																						9

Source: ESPN
A = Away; H = Home; W = Win; D = Draw; L = Loss

=== Matches ===
==== 1st half ====
29 August 2020 1st week	Jong PSV	1-6	Excelsior Rotterdam	Eindhoven
16:30	Damian Timan 86'	Report	Ahmad Mendes Moreira 5'; Joël Zwarts 36'; Thomas Oude Kotte 53'; Justin de Haas 72' (o.g.); Elías Már Ómarsson 79' 89'	Stadium: De Herdgang; Attendance: 380

6 September 2020 2nd week	Excelsior Rotterdam	4-6	Almere City FC	Rotterdam
12:15	Reuven Niemeijer 5'; Elías Már Ómarsson 16' 18' 87'	Report	Thomas Verheydt 3' 37'; Faris Hammouti 24'; Jearl Margaritha 25'; Xian Emmers 86'; Tim Receveur 88'	Stadium: Van Donge & De Roo Stadion; Attendance: 1,000

11 September 2020 3rd week	FC Dordrecht	1-3	Excelsior Rotterdam	Dordrecht
18:45	Kevin Vermeulen 10'	Report	Elías Már Ómarsson 43' 45+3'; Thomas Oude Kotte 89'	Stadium: Stadion Krommedijk; Attendance: 735

22 September 2020 4th week	Excelsior Rotterdam	1-2	SC Telstar	Rotterdam
18:45	Joël Zwarts 46'	Report	Sven van Doorm 69'; Yaël Liesdek 90+5'	Stadium: Van Donge & De Roo Stadion; Attendance: 1,250

28 September 2020 5th week	Jong Ajax	3-0	Excelsior Rotterdam	Duivendrecht, Amsterdam
18:45	Brian Brobbey 52'; Lassina Traoré 59'; Kenneth Taylor 87'	Report		Stadium: Sportpark De Toekomst; Attendance: 197

5 October 2020 6th week	Excelsior Rotterdam	1-2	De Graafschap	Rotterdam
18:45	Reuven Niemeijer 18' (pen.)	Report	Mohamed Hamdaoui 3'; Ralf Seuntjens 89'	Stadium: Van Donge & De Roo Stadion

9 October 2020 7th week	FC Eindhoven	1-1	Excelsior Rotterdam	Eindhoven
21:00	Flor Van Den Eynden 76'	Report	Elías Már Ómarsson 63'	Stadium: Jan Louwers Stadion

16 October 2020 8th week	Excelsior Rotterdam	2-0	MVV Maastricht	Rotterdam
21:00	Julian Baas 52'; Elías Már Ómarsson 55'	Report		Stadium: Van Donge & De Roo Stadion

23 October 2020 9th week	FC Den Bosch	0-1	Excelsior Rotterdam	Den Bosch
21:00		Report	Elías Már Ómarsson 90+4'	Stadium: De Vliert

31 October 2020 10th week	Go Ahead Eagles	0-0	Excelsior Rotterdam	Deventer
14:00		Report		Stadium: De Adelaarshorst

10 November 2020 11th week	Excelsior Rotterdam	3-0	TOP Oss	Rotterdam
18:45	Elías Már Ómarsson 2' 52' 88'	Report		Stadium: Van Donge & De Roo Stadion

13 November 2020 12th week	Helmond Sport	2-1	Excelsior Rotterdam	Helmond
18:45	Jelle Goselink 27'; Jeff Stans 58'	Report	Elías Már Ómarsson 90+4'	Stadium: Stadion De Braak

20 November 2020 13th week	Excelsior Rotterdam	4-1	Jong AZ	Rotterdam
18:45	Elías Már Ómarsson 56'; Tijs Velthuis 67' (o.g.); Ahmad Mendes Moreira 83'; Stijn Meijer 90+3'	Report	Des Kunst 88'	Stadium: Van Donge & De Roo Stadion

28 November 2020 14th week	Roda JC Kerkrade	3-1	Excelsior Rotterdam	Kerkrade
14:00	Fabian Serrarens 24'; Niek Vossebelt 52'; Thijmen Goppel 69'	Report	Elías Már Ómarsson 7'	Stadium: Parkstad Limburg Stadion

7 December 2020 15th week	Excelsior Rotterdam	2-3	FC Volendam	Rotterdam
21:00	Luigi Bruins 17'; Siebe Horemans 32'	Report	Boy Deul 14' 88'; Martijn Kaars 39'	Stadium: Van Donge & De Roo Stadion

11 December 2020 16th week	Jong FC Utrecht	3-2	Excelsior Rotterdam	Utrecht
18:45	Odysseus Velanas 23'; Jeredy Hilterman 40'; Hicham Acheffay 40'	Report	Abdallah Aberkane 82'; Elías Már Ómarsson 90+2' (pen.)	Stadium: Sportcomplex Zoudenbalch

20 December 2020 17th week	Excelsior Rotterdam	0-1	SC Cambuur	Rotterdam
12:15		Report	Robert Mühren 13'	Stadium: Van Donge & De Roo Stadion

==== 2nd half ====
3 January 2021 18th week	Excelsior Rotterdam	0-3	NAC Breda	Rotterdam
12:15		Report	Lewis Fiorini 17'; Kaj de Rooij 44'; Mario Bilate 86'	Stadium: Van Donge & De Roo Stadion

8 January 2021 19th week	NEC Nijmegen	3-2	Excelsior Rotterdam	Nijmegen
18:45	Jonathan Okita 50'; Souffian El Karouani 79'; Jordy Bruijn 85' (pen.)	Report	Joël Zwarts 14'; Mitchell van Rooijen 17'	Stadium: Goffertstadion

15 January 2021 20th week	Excelsior Rotterdam	1-0	FC Eindhoven	Rotterdam
18:45	Reuven Niemeijer 28'	Report		Stadium: Van Donge & De Roo Stadion

23 January 2021 21st week	TOP Oss	1-3	Excelsior Rotterdam	Oss
16:30	Dennis van der Heijden 56'	Report	Joël Zwarts 31'; Elías Már Ómarsson 77'; Luigi Bruins 89' (pen.)	Stadium: Frans Heesen Stadion

30 January 2021 22nd week	Excelsior Rotterdam	4-4	FC Den Bosch	Rotterdam
14:00	Reuven Niemeijer 10' 39'; Joël Zwarts 47'; Luigi Bruins 77' (pen.)	Report	Jizz Hornkamp 52' 55' (pen.) 78' 86'	Stadium: Van Donge & De Roo Stadion

5 February 2021 23rd week	FC Volendam	0-2	Excelsior Rotterdam	Volendam
21:00		Report	Reuven Niemeijer 82'; Mats Wieffer 90+6'	Stadium: Kras Stadion

15 February 2021 24th week	Excelsior Rotterdam	1-3	Roda JC Kerkrade	Rotterdam
21:00	Siebe Horemans 90+3'	Report	Erik Falkenburg 37'; Dylan Vente 70'; Benjamin Bouchouari 83'	Stadium: Van Donge & De Roo Stadion

20 February 2021 25th week	MVV Maastricht	1-0	Excelsior Rotterdam	Maastricht
16:30	Djibril Dianessy 88'	Report		Stadium: De Geusselt

1 March 2021 26th week	Excelsior Rotterdam	5-1	Jong Ajax	Rotterdam
18:45	Rio Hillen 8' (o.g.); Julian Baas 20'; Reuven Niemeijer 24'; Ahmad Mendes Moreira 82'; Joël Zwarts 90+5'	Report	Kenneth Taylor 74' (pen.)	Stadium: Van Donge & De Roo Stadion

6 March 2021 27th week	Almere City FC	4-1	Excelsior Rotterdam	Almere
14:00	Faris Hammouti 37' 44'; Xian Emmers 79'; John Yeboah 90'	Report	Ahmad Mendes Moreira 88'	Stadium: Yanmar Stadion

12 March 2021 28th week	Excelsior Rotterdam	2-0	Jong FC Utrecht	Rotterdam
18:45	Joël Zwarts 11'; Reuven Niemeijer 53'	Report		Stadium: Van Donge & De Roo Stadion

19 March 2021 29th week	De Graafschap	1-1	Excelsior Rotterdam	Doetinchem
20:00	Daryl van Mieghem 3'	Report	Julian Baas 22'	Stadium: De Vijverberg

28 March 2021 30th week	Excelsior Rotterdam	0-3	Helmond Sport	Rotterdam
14:30		Report	Dean van der Sluys 58'; Jordy Thomassen 86'; Arno Van Keilegom 89'	Stadium: Van Donge & De Roo Stadion

2 April 2021 31st week	Excelsior Rotterdam	0-0	Jong PSV	Rotterdam
20:00		Report		Stadium: Van Donge & De Roo Stadion

5 April 2021 32nd week	SC Cambuur	7-2	Excelsior Rotterdam	Leeuwarden
14:30	Jarchinio Antonia 14'; Robert Mühren 63' 76' (pen.) 87' (pen.); Ragnar Oratmangoen 71' 84' 90'	Report	Joël Zwarts 6'; Elías Már Ómarsson 52'	Stadium: Cambuur Stadion

9 April 2021 33rd week	Excelsior Rotterdam	2-1	NEC Nijmegen	Rotterdam
20:00	Joël Zwarts 63' 79'	Report	Javier Vet 16'	Stadium: Van Donge & De Roo Stadion

16 April 2021 34th week	SC Telstar	1-1	Excelsior Rotterdam	Velsen-Zuid
20:00	Ozan Kökçü 38'	Report	Sondre Skogen 90'	Stadium: BUKO Stadion

23 April 2021 35th week	NAC Breda	1-2	Excelsior Rotterdam	Breda
18:45	Mounir El Allouchi 45' (pen.)	Report	Reuven Niemeijer 55' 60'	Stadium: Rat Verlegh Stadion

30 April 2021 36th week	Excelsior Rotterdam	3-0	FC Dordrecht	Rotterdam
20:00	Elías Már Ómarsson 2' 50'; Reuven Niemeijer 11'	Report		Stadium: Van Donge & De Roo Stadion

7 May 2021 37th week	Jong AZ	2-1	Excelsior Rotterdam	Den Haag
20:00	Jelle Duin 17' 45+1'	Report	Elías Már Ómarsson 7'	Stadium: AFAS Trainingscomplex

12 May 2021 38th week	Excelsior Rotterdam	0-1	Go Ahead Eagles	Rotterdam
20:00		Report	Elías Már Ómarsson 7'	Stadium: Van Donge & De Roo Stadion

=== KNVB Cup ===
26 October 2020 1st round	Excelsior Rotterdam	4-0	Helmond Sport	Rotterdam
18:45		Report		Stadium: Van Donge & De Roo Stadion

15 December 2020 2nd round	Excelsior Rotterdam	2-0	PEC Zwolle	Rotterdam
18:45		Report		Stadium: Van Donge & De Roo Stadion

19 January 2021 3rd round	MVV Maastricht	2-2 (a.e.t.) (4-5 p)	Excelsior Rotterdam	Maastricht
16:30		Report		Stadium: De Geusselt

9 February 2021 Quarter final	Excelsior Rotterdam	0-1	SBV Vitesse	Rotterdam
20:00		Report		Stadium: Van Donge & De Roo Stadion

== Player statistics ==
=== Appearances and goals ===
No.	Pos	Nat	Player	Total		Eerste Divisie		KNVB Cup	
No.	Pos	Nat	Player	Apps	Goals	Apps	Goals	Apps	Goals
22	FW	(Netherlands) NED	Reuven Niemeijer	42	11	38	10	4	1
2	DF	(Belgium) BEL	Siebe Horemans	42	3	38	2	4	1
9	FW	(Iceland) ISL	Elías Már Ómarsson	41	21	37	18	4	3
1	GK	(Netherlands) NED	Alessandro Damen	38	0	34	0	4	0
18	FW	(Guinea-Bissau) GNB	Ahmad Mendes Moreira	37	5	33	4	4	1
11	FW	(Netherlands) NED	Joël Zwarts	36	11	32	10	4	1
8	MF	(Netherlands) NED	Mats Wieffer	35	1	31	1	4	0
3	DF	(Belgium) BEL	Hervé Matthys	34	0	30	0	4	0
33	MF	(Netherlands) NED	Julian Baas	34	4	31	4	3	0
10	MF	(Netherlands) NED	Luigi Bruins	30	2	28	2	2	0
16	DF	(Netherlands) NED	Sander Fischer	29	0	27	0	2	0
24	DF	(England) ENG	Brandon Ormonde-Ottewill	28	0	25	0	3	0
26	MF	(Netherlands) NED	Mitchell van Rooijen	26	1	24	1	2	0
5	DF	(Netherlands) NED	Robin van der Meer	24	0	21	0	3	0
4	DF	(Netherlands) NED	Thomas Oude Kotte	23	4	21	3	2	1
7	FW	(Netherlands) NED	Stijn Meijer	21	1	19	1	2	0
6	DF	(Netherlands) NED	Abdallah Aberkane	19	1	15	1	4	0
17	FW	(Netherlands) NED	Thomas Verhaar	17	0	14	0	3	0
20	FW	(Belgium) BEL	Dylan Seys	13	0	12	0	1	0
28	DF	(India) IND	Nathan Tjoe-A-On	11	0	10	0	1	0
15	DF	(Norway) NOR	Sondre Skogen	7	1	7	1	0	0
31	FW	(Netherlands) NED	Dave van Delft	6	0	6	0	0	0
21	MF	(Netherlands) NED	Niek den Heeten	5	0	4	0	1	0
14	DF	(Morocco) MAR	Redouan El Hankouri	5	0	5	0	0	0
23	GK	(Netherlands) NED	Maarten de Fockert	4	0	4	0	0	0
27	FW	(Netherlands) NED	Delano Gouda	1	0	1	0	0	0
40	DF	(Netherlands) NED	Jaimy Buter	1	0	1	0	0	0
25	MF	(Netherlands) NED	Joshua Eijgenraam	1	0	1	0	0	0

=== Clean sheets ===
#	Player	Eerste Divisie	KNVB Cup	Total
1	(Netherlands) Alessandro Damen	8	2	10

=== Disciplinary record ===
#	Player	Eredivisie		KNVB Cup		Total	
#	Player	Booked	Sent off (straight red)	Booked	Sent off (straight red)	Booked	Sent off (straight red)
1	(England) Brandon Ormonde-Ottewill	2	2	0	0	2	2
2	(Netherlands) Mats Wieffer	9	1	0	0	9	1
3	(Netherlands) Julian Baas	4	1	1	0	5	1
4	(Netherlands) Robin van der Meer	2	1	0	0	2	1
5	(Belgium) Hervé Matthys	5	0	1	0	6	0
6	(Netherlands) Luigi Bruins	5	0	0	0	5	0
7	(Guinea-Bissau) Ahmad Mendes Moreira	4	0	0	0	4	0
8	(Netherlands) Reuven Niemeijer	2	0	1	0	3	0
8	(Belgium) Siebe Horemans	2	0	1	0	3	0
10	(Netherlands) Abdallah Aberkane	2	0	0	0	2	0
10	(Netherlands) Joël Zwarts	2	0	0	0	2	0
10	(Norway) Sondre Skogen	2	0	0	0	2	0
10	(Netherlands) Thomas Oude Kotte	2	0	0	0	2	0
14	(Netherlands) Alessandro Damen	1	0	0	0	1	0
14	(Netherlands) Delano Gouda	1	0	0	0	1	0
14	(Belgium) Dylan Seys	1	0	0	0	1	0
14	(Netherlands) Mitchell van Rooijen	1	0	0	0	1	0
14	(India) Nathan Tjoe-A-On	1	0	0	0	1	0
14	(Netherlands) Sander Fischer	1	0	0	0	1	0
