= 2019–20 Excelsior Rotterdam season =

Dutch football club season

Excelsior Rotterdam
2019–20 season
- Manager: Ricardo Moniz (until 28 January 2020); Marinus Dijkhuizen (from 29 January 2020)
- Stadium: Van Donge & De Roo Stadion
- Eerste Divisie: 7th
- KNVB Cup: 2nd round
- Top goalscorer: League: Rai Vloet (14 goals); All: Rai Vloet (14 goals)
- Highest home attendance: 4,046 (24th week against NAC Breda)
- Lowest home attendance: 1,902 (KNVB Cup 1st & 2nd round)
- Average home league attendance: 3,134
- Biggest win: 5-2 Jong PSV (h) 8th week 4-1 Roda JC Kerkrade (a) 17th week 3-0 MVV Maastricht (h) 29th week
- Biggest defeat: 4-0 SC Cambuur (a) 9th week
- All statistics correct as of 9 October 2025.

The 2019–20 season was Excelsior Rotterdam's 29th season in the Eerste Divisie (1st consecutive). Due to the COVID-19 pandemic, the 2019-20 Eerste Divisie season was abandoned with Excelsior Rotterdam in 7th place.

The club also competed in the KNVB Cup, where they were eliminated in the second round following a 2-0 defeat to FC Eindhoven.

Rai Vloet was the top scorer of the club in this season with 14 goals in Eerste Divisie.

Rai Vloet was also the most appeared player in this season with 31 appearances; 29 appearances in the Eerste Divisie and 2 appearances in the KNVB Cup.

== Players ==
=== First-team squad ===
Note: Flags indicate national team as defined under FIFA eligibility rules; some limited exceptions apply. Players may hold more than one non-FIFA nationality.

No.	Pos.	Nation	Player
1	GK	NED	Alessandro Damen
2	DF	BEL	Siebe Horemans
3	DF	BEL	Hervé Matthys
4	DF	NED	Thomas Oude Kotte
5	DF	NED	Robin van der Meer
6	DF	NED	Abdallah Aberkane
7	FW	NED	Stijn Meijer
8	MF	NED	Kyle Ebecilio
9	FW	ISL	Elías Már Ómarsson
10	MF	NED	Luigi Bruins
11	FW	NED	Joël Zwarts

No.	Pos.	Nation	Player
15	DF	ENG	Cameron Humphreys
16	DF	NED	Sander Fischer
17	FW	NED	Thomas Verhaar
18	FW	GBS	Ahmad Mendes Moreira
19	FW	NED	Arsenio Valpoort
21	MF	TUR	Dogucan Haspolat
22	DF	CPV	Jeffry Fortes
23	GK	NED	Maarten de Fockert
24	DF	ENG	Brandon Ormonde-Ottewill
35	MF	NED	Wouter Burger

== Transfers ==
=== Players In ===
Date	Position	Player	From	Type	Fee	Ref.
1 July 2019	MF	(Netherlands) Kyle Ebecilio	(Netherlands) ADO Den Haag	Transfer	Free	
1 July 2019	FW	(Netherlands) Joël Zwarts	(Netherlands) Feyenoord	Transfer	Free	
1 July 2019	DF	(Netherlands) Sander Fischer	(Denmark) Vendsyssel FF	Transfer	Free	
1 July 2019	FW	(Netherlands) Thomas Verhaar	(South Africa) Ajax Cape Town	Transfer	Free	
1 July 2019	DF	(Netherlands) Tobias Kleijweg	(Netherlands) Excelsior Maassluis	Transfer	Free	
2 July 2019	DF	(Belgium) Siebe Horemans	(Belgium) KAA Gent	Transfer	Undisclosed	
2 July 2019	FW	(Netherlands) Stijn Meijer	(Netherlands) Almere City FC	Free		
8 July 2019	FW	(Guinea) Ahmad Mendes Moreira	(Netherlands) FC Groningen	Transfer	Free	
13 July 2019	MF	(Netherlands) Rai Vloet	(Netherlands) Sint-Truidense V.V.	Transfer	Free	
3 September 2019	FW	(Netherlands) Arsenio Valpoort	(Belgium) K.S.V. Roeselare	Transfer	Free	
14 January 2020	DF	(Netherlands) Abdallah Aberkane	(Netherlands) Sparta Rotterdam	Transfer	Free	
21 January 2020	DF	(England) Cameron Humphreys	(Belgium) SV Zulte Waregem	On loan		
23 January 2020	DF	(Netherlands) Wouter Burger	(Netherlands) Feyenoord	On loan		
30 January 2020	DF	(England) Brandon Ormonde-Ottewill	(Netherlands) FC Dordrecht	On loan		

=== Players Out ===
Date	Position	Player	To	Type	Fee	Ref.
30 June 2019	FW	(Germany) Dennis Eckert	(Spain) RC Celta de Vigo	End of Loan		
30 June 2019	FW	(England) Marcus Edwards	(England) Tottenham Hotspur F.C. U23	End of Loan		
1 July 2019	MF	(Netherlands) Anouar Hadouir	(Netherlands) SV CHC	Transfer	Free	
1 July 2019	DF	(United States) Desevio Payne	(Netherlands) FC Emmen	Transfer	Free	
1 July 2019	DF	(Netherlands) Lorenzo Burnet	(Netherlands) FC Emmen	Transfer	Free	
1 July 2019	MF	(Netherlands) Ryan Koolwijk	(Slovakia) Trencin	Transfer	Free	
1 July 2019	DF	(Netherlands) Jurgen Mattheij	(Netherlands) Sparta Rotterdam	Transfer	Free	
2 July 2019	FW	(Belgium) Jinty Caenepeel	(Belgium) Royal Knokke F.C.	Transfer	Free	
4 July 2019	MF	(Netherlands) Jerdy Schouten	(Italy) Bologna	Transfer	€2,150,000	
21 July 2019	MF	(Netherlands) Ali Messaoud	(Denmark) Vendsyssel FF	Transfer	Free	
23 July 2019	GK	(Netherlands) Sonny Stevens	(Netherlands) SC Cambuur	Transfer	Free	
25 July 2019	FW	(North Macedonia) Denis Mahmudov	(Armenia) FC Pyunik	Transfer		
1 August 2019	FW	(Morocco) Mounir El Hamdaoui	(Qatar) Al Kharaitiyat SC	Transfer	Free	
13 January 2020	FW	(Turkey) Doğucan Haspolat	(Turkey) Kasımpaşa S.K.	Transfer	€300,000	
26 January 2020	DF	(Cape Verde) Jeffry Fortes	(Netherlands) Sparta Rotterdam	Transfer		

== Competitions ==
=== Overall record ===
Competition	First match	Last match	Starting round	Final position	Record							
Competition	First match	Last match	Starting round	Final position	Pld	W	D	L	GF	GA	GD	Win %
Eredivisie	10 August 2019	6 March 2020	Week 1	7th	29	13	8	8	65	55	+10	44.83
KNVB Cup	29 October 2019	17 December 2019	1st round	2nd round	2	1	0	1	4	4	+0	50.00
Total					31	14	8	9	69	59	+10	45.16

Source: ESPN

=== Eerste Divisie ===
==== League table ====
Pos	Team	Pld	W	D	L	GF	GA	GD	Pts
5	NAC Breda (Note: Winner of the First Period (games 1-9).)	29	14	8	7	48	30	+18	50
6	Go Ahead Eagles	29	12	12	5	49	41	+8	48
7	Excelsior	29	13	8	8	65	55	+10	47
8	NEC Nijmegen	29	12	9	8	51	37	+14	45
9	Almere City FC	29	13	5	11	44	42	+2	44

Updated to match(es) played on 9 March 2020. Source: Soccerway, Keuken Kampioen Divisie (in Dutch)
Rules for classification: Season in progress: 1) Most points won; 2) Fewest points lost; 3) Goal difference; 4) Goals scored; 5) Alphabetical order; End of season: 1) Points; 2) Goal difference; 3) Goals scored; 4) Head-to-head points; 5) Head-to-head goal difference; 6) Head-to-head away goals scored; 7) Play-off if relevant for deciding champion, relegation or participating in a European league, otherwise by draw. 8) Penalty shoot-out (only after a play-off)

==== Results summary ====
Overall								Home						Away					
Pld	W	D	L	GF	GA	GD	Pts	W	D	L	GF	GA	GD	W	D	L	GF	GA	GD
29	13	8	8	65	55	+10	47	9	3	3	44	32	+12	4	5	5	21	23	−2

Source: https://www.espn.nl/voetbal/stand/_/competitie/NED.1/season/2019

==== Results by round ====
Round	1	2	3	4	5	6	7	8	9	10	11	12	13	14	15	16	17	18	19	20	21	22	23	24	25	26	27	28	29
Ground	H	A	A	H	5	H	A	H	A	10	A	H	A	H	15	H	A	H	A	20	A	H	A	H	25	H	H	A	H
Result	W	W	L	W	5	W	L	W	L	10	D	L	D	W	15	L	W	W	W	20	D	D	L	D	25	D	W	L	W
Position																													7

Source: ESPN
A = Away; H = Home; W = Win; D = Draw; L = Loss

=== Matches ===
==== 1st half ====
10 August 2019 1st week	Excelsior Rotterdam	2-0	Jong FC Utrecht	Rotterdam
19:45	Joël Zwarts 63' 73'	Report		Stadium: Van Donge & De Roo Stadion; Attendance: 3,062

19 August 2019 2nd week	Jong AZ	1-2	Excelsior Rotterdam	The Hague
20:00	Albert Gudmundsson 69' (pen.)	Report	Thomas Verhaar 31'; Jeffry Fortes 64'	Stadium: AFAS Trainingscomplex; Attendance: 500

23 August 2019 3rd week	SC Telstar	3-0	Excelsior Rotterdam	Velsen-Zuid
20:00	Reda Kharchouch 36'; Senne Lynen 58'; Glynor Plet 90+1'	Report		Stadium: BUKO Stadion; Attendance: 2,362

30 August 2019 4th week	Excelsior Rotterdam	3-1	Helmond Sport	Rotterdam
20:00	Jeffry Fortes 17' 87'; Ahmad Mendes Moreira 82'	Report	Diego Snepvangers 28'	Stadium: Van Donge & De Roo Stadion; Attendance: 2,683

7 September 2019 5th week	Go Ahead Eagles	2-2	Excelsior Rotterdam	Deventer
20:45	Elmo Lieftink 19'; Alexander Bannink 89'	Report	Ahmad Mendes Moreira 47' 57'	Stadium: De Adelaarshorst; Attendance: 9,000

13 September 2019 6th week	Excelsior Rotterdam	4-2	Almere City FC	Rotterdam
20:00	Rai Vloet 49' 69'; Joël Zwarts 53'; Stijn Meijer 90'	Report	Shayon Harrison 64'; Anass Ahannach 77'	Stadium: Van Donge & De Roo Stadion; Attendance: 2,975

20 September 2019 7th week	NAC Breda	2-1	Excelsior Rotterdam	Breda
20:00	Ivan Ilic 61'; Sydney van Hooijdonk 87'	Report	Elías Már Ómarsson 76'	Stadium: Rat Verlegh Stadion; Attendance: 17,156

27 September 2019 8th week	Excelsior Rotterdam	5-2	Jong PSV	Rotterdam
20:00	Jeffry Fortes 5' 86'; Stijn Meijer 8' 29'; Dogucan Haspolat 24'	Report	Robin Lauwers 63'; Cyril Ngonge 65'	Stadium: Van Donge & De Roo Stadion; Attendance: 2,715

4 October 2019 9th week	SC Cambuur	4-0	Excelsior Rotterdam	Leeuwarden
20:00	Jamie Jacobs 23'; Jordy van Deelen 31'; Ragnar Oratmangoen 42'; Jarchinio Antonia 83'	Report		Stadium: Cambuur Stadion; Attendance: 8,742

13 October 2019 10th week	Excelsior Rotterdam	3-2	FC Dordrecht	Rotterdam
14:30	Rai Vloet 51' 71'; Stijn Meijer 54'	Report	Anass Achahbar 27'; Quincy Hogesteger 89'	Stadium: Van Donge & De Roo Stadion; Attendance: 3,300

18 October 2019 11th week	MVV Maastricht	0-0	Excelsior Rotterdam	Maastricht
20:00		Report		Stadium: De Geusselt; Attendance: 3,494

25 October 2019 12th week	Excelsior Rotterdam	1-3	Jong Ajax	Rotterdam
20:00	Rai Vloet 71'	Report	Jurgen Ekkelenkamp 8'; Lassina Traoré 53' 73'	Stadium: Van Donge & De Roo Stadion; Attendance: 3,571

1 November 2019 13th week	De Graafschap	0-0	Excelsior Rotterdam	Doetinchem
20:00		Report		Stadium: De Vijverberg; Attendance: 9,511

8 November 2019 14th week	Excelsior Rotterdam	5-4	FC Eindhoven	Rotterdam
20:00	Rai Vloet 6'; Stijn Meijer 12'; Elías Már Ómarsson 38' 77'; Thomas Verhaar 46'	Report	Kaj de Rooij 4'; Rigino Cicilia 10' 57'; Thomas Oude Kotte 34' (o.g.)	Stadium: Van Donge & De Roo Stadion; Attendance: 3,165

17 November 2019 15th week	FC Den Bosch	3-3	Excelsior Rotterdam	Den Bosch
14:30	Ruben Rodrigues 18' 84'; Mats Deijl 50' (pen.)	Report	Rai Vloet 15'; Ahmad Mendes Moreira 44'; Stijn Meijer 66'	Stadium: De Vliert; Attendance: 3,178

22 November 2019 16th week	Excelsior Rotterdam	1-2	FC Volendam	Rotterdam
20:00	Jeffry Fortes 70'	Report	Martijn Kaars 11'; Derry Murkin 32'	Stadium: Van Donge & De Roo Stadion; Attendance: 3,504

29 November 2019 17th week	Roda JC Kerkrade	1-4	Excelsior Rotterdam	Kerkrade
20:00	Roland Alberg 4'	Report	Joël Zwarts 13' 88'; Pepijn Schlösser 25' (o.g.); Ahmad Mendes Moreira 90+4'	Stadium: Parkstad Limburg Stadion; Attendance: 8,247

6 December 2019 18th week	Excelsior Rotterdam	2-1	NEC Nijmegen	Rotterdam
20:00	Sander Fischer 48'; Joël Zwarts 73'	Report	Ole Romeny 49'	Stadium: Van Donge & De Roo Stadion; Attendance: 3,384

13 December 2019 19th week	TOP Oss	0-2	Excelsior Rotterdam	Oss
20:00		Report	Joël Zwarts 74'; Luigi Bruins 90+2' (pen.)	Stadium: Frans Heesen Stadion; Attendance: 1,028

22 December 2019 20th week	Excelsior Rotterdam	1-3	SC Cambuur	Rotterdam
14:30	Rai Vloet 83'	Report	Robert Mühren 11' (pen.); Jamie Jacobs 29'; Issa Kallon 90+1'	Stadium: Van Donge & De Roo Stadion; Attendance: 3,612

==== 2nd half ====
10 January 2020 21st week	FC Dordrecht	1-1	Excelsior Rotterdam	Dordrecht
20:00	Renny Smith 53'	Report	Joël Zwarts 43'	Stadium: Stadion Krommedijk; Attendance: 2,225

17 January 2020 22nd week	Excelsior Rotterdam	3-3	SC Telstar	Rotterdam
20:00	Elías Már Ómarsson 48' 57'; Frank Korpershoek 70' (o.g.)	Report	Shayne Pattynama 15'; Reda Kharchouch 65'; Glynor Plet 71'	Stadium: Van Donge & De Roo Stadion; Attendance: 2,722

27 January 2020 23rd week	Jong PSV	2-1	Excelsior Rotterdam	Eindhoven
20:00	Noni Madueke 71'; Cyril Ngonge 90+4'	Report	Sander Fischer 42'	Stadium: De Herdgang; Attendance: 506

31 January 2020 24th week	Excelsior Rotterdam	2-2	NAC Breda	Rotterdam
20:00	Rai Vloet 30'; Luigi Bruins 73' (pen.)	Report	Jan Paul van Hecke 87'; Arno Verschueren 90+4'	Stadium: Van Donge & De Roo Stadion; Attendance: 4,046

7 February 2020 25th week	Helmond Sport	1-4	Excelsior Rotterdam	Helmond
20:00	Givan Werkhoven 80'	Report	Thomas Verhaar 3'; Elías Már Ómarsson 70' 72'; Rai Vloet 73'	Stadium: Stadion De Braak; Attendance: 1,337

14 February 2020 26th week	Excelsior Rotterdam	3-3	Jong AZ	Rotterdam
20:00	Rai Vloet 53'; Elías Már Ómarsson 75'; Ahmad Mendes Moreira 80'	Report	Joerie Church 34'; Richonell Margaret 51'; Felix Correia 82'	Stadium: Van Donge & De Roo Stadion; Attendance: 2,712

21 February 2020 27th week	Excelsior Rotterdam	6-4	FC Den Bosch	Rotterdam
20:00	Elías Már Ómarsson 27' 80'; Rai Vloet 41' 90+3'; Luigi Bruins 65' (pen.); Joël Zwarts 76'	Report	Pedro Marques 49' 61' 71'; Danny Verbeek 54'	Stadium: Van Donge & De Roo Stadion; Attendance: 2,815

28 February 2020 28th week	FC Eindhoven	3-1	Excelsior Rotterdam	Eindhoven
20:00	Rigino Cicilia 38'; Kaj de Rooij 48'; Samy Bourard 72' (pen.)	Report	Luigi Bruins 90+3' (pen.)	Stadium: Jan Louwers Stadion; Attendance: 1,957

6 March 2020 29th week	Excelsior Rotterdam	3-0	MVV Maastricht	Rotterdam
20:00	Elías Már Ómarsson 64' 79'; Rai Vloet 75'	Report		Stadium: Van Donge & De Roo Stadion; Attendance: 2,750

=== KNVB Cup ===
29 October 2019 1st round	Excelsior Rotterdam	4–2 (a.e.t.)	NEC Nijmegen	Rotterdam
19:45 CET	Thomas Oude Kotte 51' 105'; Thomas Verhaar 88', 106'	Report	Anthony Musaba 3' 66'	Stadium: Van Donge & De Roo Stadion; Attendance: 1,902; Referee: Edwin van de Graaf

17 December 2019 2nd round	Excelsior Rotterdam	0–2	FC Eindhoven	Rotterdam
19:45 CET		Report	Jort van der Sande 64'; Samy Bourard 88'	Stadium: Van Donge & De Roo Stadion; Attendance: 1,902; Referee: Edgar Bijl

== Player statistics ==
=== Appearances and goals ===
As of 6 March 2020

No.	Pos	Nat	Player	Total		Eerste Divisie		KNVB Cup	
No.	Pos	Nat	Player	Apps	Goals	Apps	Goals	Apps	Goals
1	GK	(Netherlands) NED	Alessandro Damen	28	0	26	0	2	0
2	DF	(Belgium) BEL	Siebe Horemans	26	0	25	0	1	0
3	DF	(Belgium) BEL	Hervé Matthys	26	0	24	0	2	0
4	DF	(Netherlands) NED	Thomas Oude Kotte	23	2	21	0	2	2
5	DF	(Netherlands) NED	Robin van der Meer	16	0	14	0	2	0
6	MF	(Netherlands) NED	Doğucan Haspolat	21	1	19	1	2	0
6	DF	(Netherlands) NED	Abdallah Aberkane	7	0	7	0	0	0
7	FW	(Netherlands) NED	Stijn Meijer	22	6	20	6	2	0
8	MF	(Netherlands) NED	Kyle Ebecilio	6	0	6	0	0	0
9	FW	(Iceland) ISL	Elías Már Ómarsson	30	12	28	12	2	0
10	MF	(Netherlands) NED	Luigi Bruins	27	4	25	4	2	0
11	FW	(Netherlands) NED	Joël Zwarts	30	9	28	9	2	0
15	DF	(England) ENG	Cameron Humphreys	3	0	3	0	0	0
16	DF	(Netherlands) NED	Sander Fischer	29	2	27	2	2	0
17	FW	(Netherlands) NED	Thomas Verhaar	26	5	24	3	2	2
18	FW	(Netherlands) NED	Ahmad Mendes Moreira	29	6	28	6	1	0
19	FW	(Netherlands) NED	Arsenio Valpoort	6	0	5	0	1	0
20	MF	(Netherlands) NED	Rai Vloet	31	14	29	14	2	0
22	MF	(Netherlands) NED	Jeffry Fortes	22	6	20	6	2	0
23	GK	(Netherlands) NED	Maarten de Fockert	4	0	4	0	0	0
24	DF	(England) ENG	Brandon Ormonde-Ottewill	5	0	5	0	0	0
35	MF	(Netherlands) NED	Wouter Burger	7	0	7	0	0	0

=== Clean sheets ===
#	Player	Eerste Divisie
1	(Netherlands) Alessandro Damen	3

=== Disciplinary record ===
#	Player	Eerste Divisie		KNVB Cup		Total	
#	Player	Yellow card	Red card	Yellow card	Red card	Yellow card	Red card
1	(Netherlands) Sander Fischer	3	1	0	1	3	2
2	(Netherlands) Luigi Bruins	6	1	1	0	7	1
3	(Netherlands) Alessandro Damen	1	1	0	0	1	1
4	(Cape Verde) Jeffry Fortes	7	0	0	0	7	0
5	(Netherlands) Rai Vloet	4	0	1	0	5	0
6	(Guinea-Bissau) Ahmad Mendes Moreira	4	0	0	0	4	0
7	(Belgium) Hervé Matthys	3	0	0	0	3	0
7	(Netherlands) Robin van der Meer	3	0	0	0	3	0
9	(Turkey) Dogucan Haspolat	2	0	0	0	2	0
9	(Belgium) Siebe Horemans	2	0	0	0	2	0
9	(Netherlands) Thomas Oude Kotte	2	0	0	0	2	0
12	(Iceland) Elías Már Ómarsson	0	0	1	0	1	0
12	(Netherlands) Kyle Ebecilio	1	0	0	0	1	0
12	(Netherlands) Stijn Meijer	1	0	0	0	1	0
12	(Netherlands) Thomas Verhaar	1	0	0	0	1	0
