= 2019–20 AFC Ajax season =

Dutch football club season

Ajax
2019–20 season
- Owner: AFC Ajax N.V.
- CEO: Edwin van der Sar
- Manager: Erik ten Hag
- Stadium: Johan Cruyff Arena
- Eredivisie: 1st (no title awarded)
- KNVB Cup: Semi-finals
- UEFA Champions League: Group stage
- UEFA Europa League: Round of 32
- Johan Cruyff Shield: Winners
- Top goalscorer: League: Quincy Promes (12); All: Quincy Promes; Dušan Tadić (16 each)
- Highest home attendance: 54,022 (vs. Willem II, 6 December 2019)
- Lowest home attendance: 51,441 (vs. Lille, 17 September 2019)
- Average home league attendance: 53,342
Home colours	Away colours

During the 2019–20 season, Ajax participated in the Eredivisie, the KNVB Cup, the UEFA Champions League, the UEFA Europa League and the Johan Cruyff Shield.

Due to the COVID-19 pandemic, on 21 April, Dutch Prime Minister Mark Rutte announced that events that require a permit are forbidden until 1 September. This meant that football matches were also not allowed, resulting in the end of the 2019–20 Eredivisie season. As a result, the KNVB decided on 24 April to maintain the current league positions but not to appoint a champion. Since Ajax was in first place on 8 March (after the last completed round), it was awarded the highest 2020–21 UEFA Champions League spot without being crowned as national champion.

== Squad ==
=== Squad information ===
As of 21 February 2020

Note: Flags indicate national team as defined under FIFA eligibility rules; some limited exceptions apply. Players may hold more than one non-FIFA nationality.

No.	Pos.	Nation	Player
1	GK	POR	Bruno Varela (on loan from Benfica)
2	DF	NED	Perr Schuurs
3	DF	NED	Joël Veltman
4	DF	MEX	Edson Álvarez
5	DF	NED	Kik Pierie
6	MF	NED	Donny van de Beek
7	FW	BRA	David Neres
8	MF	NED	Carel Eiting
9	FW	NED	Klaas-Jan Huntelaar
10	FW	SRB	Dušan Tadić (captain)
11	FW	NED	Quincy Promes
12	DF	MAR	Noussair Mazraoui
17	DF	NED	Daley Blind (vice-captain)

No.	Pos.	Nation	Player
18	MF	ROU	Răzvan Marin
19	MF	MAR	Zakaria Labyad
21	DF	ARG	Lisandro Martínez
22	MF	MAR	Hakim Ziyech
23	FW	BFA	Lassina Traoré
24	GK	CMR	André Onana
26	MF	NED	Jurgen Ekkelenkamp
28	DF	USA	Sergiño Dest
29	MF	NED	Ryan Gravenberch
31	DF	ARG	Nicolás Tagliafico
33	GK	CRO	Dominik Kotarski
35	GK	NED	Kjell Scherpen
49	FW	NED	Ryan Babel

== Transfers ==
For a list of all Dutch football transfers in the summer window (1 July 2019 to 31 August 2019) please see List of Dutch football transfers summer 2019. For a list of all Dutch football transfers in the winter window (1 January 2020 to 1 February 2020) please see List of Dutch football transfers winter 2019–20.

=== In ===
Date	Position	Player	From	Type	Fee	Ref.
1 July 2019	MF	(Romania) Răzvan Marin	(Belgium) Standard Liège	Transfer	€12,500,000	
1 July 2019	DF	(Argentina) Lisandro Martínez	(Argentina) Defensa y Justicia	Transfer	€7,000,000	
1 July 2019	DF	(Netherlands) Kik Pierie	(Netherlands) Heerenveen	Transfer	€5,000,000	
1 July 2019	GK	(Netherlands) Kjell Scherpen	(Netherlands) Emmen	Transfer	Undisclosed	
1 July 2019	FW	(Netherlands) Quincy Promes	(Spain) Sevilla	Transfer	€15,700,000 (Note: Fee may eventually rise to €17,200,000.)	
1 July 2019	GK	(Portugal) Bruno Varela	(Portugal) Benfica	Loan	Undisclosed	
1 July 2019	MF	(Netherlands) Siem de Jong	(Australia) Sydney FC	Loan return		
1 July 2019	GK	(Netherlands) Benjamin van Leer	(Netherlands) NAC Breda	Loan return		
19 July 2019	DF	(Mexico) Edson Álvarez	(Mexico) América	Transfer	€15,000,000	
11 January 2020	FW	(Netherlands) Ryan Babel	(Turkey) Galatasaray	Loan	Undisclosed	

=== Out ===
Date	Position	Player	To	Type	Fee	Ref.
1 July 2019	MF	(Netherlands) Frenkie de Jong	(Spain) Barcelona	Transfer	€75,000,000 (Note: Fee may eventually rise to €86,000,000.)	
1 July 2019	DF	(Austria) Maximilian Wöber	(Spain) Sevilla	Transfer (Note: Obligated transfer, previously out on loan until 30 June 2019.)	€10,500,000 (Note: Fee may eventually rise to €11,000,000.)	
1 July 2019	DF	(Netherlands) Daley Sinkgraven	(Germany) Bayer Leverkusen	Transfer	€5,000,000	
9 July 2019	FW	(Czech Republic) Václav Černý	(Netherlands) Utrecht	Transfer	€900,000	
15 July 2019	GK	(Greece) Kostas Lamprou	(Netherlands) Vitesse	Free transfer		
18 July 2019	DF	(Netherlands) Matthijs de Ligt	(Italy) Juventus	Transfer	€75,000,000	
19 July 2019	DF	(Denmark) Rasmus Nissen	(Austria) Red Bull Salzburg	Transfer	€5,000,000	
9 August 2019	MF	(Denmark) Lasse Schöne	(Italy) Genoa	Transfer	€1,500,000	
29 August 2019	FW	(Denmark) Kasper Dolberg	(France) Nice	Transfer	€20,500,000	
30 August 2019	MF	(Netherlands) Dani de Wit	(Netherlands) AZ	Transfer	€2,000,000	
2 September 2019	FW	(Colombia) Mateo Cassierra	(Portugal) Belenenses	Transfer	€2,500,000	
30 December 2019	DF	(Colombia) Luis Manuel Orejuela	(Brazil) Cruzeiro	Transfer	€1,350,000	
31 January 2020	FW	(Netherlands) Kaj Sierhuis	(France) Reims	Transfer (Note: Was out on loan to Groningen until 30 June 2020.)	€4,000,000	
20 February 2020	MF	(Netherlands) Siem de Jong	(United States) FC Cincinnati	Free transfer		

==== On loan ====
Date	Position	Player	To	Type	Fee	Ref.
5 July 2019	FW	(Norway) Dennis Johnsen	(Netherlands) PEC Zwolle	Loan	Undisclosed	
2 September 2019	DF	(Argentina) Lisandro Magallán	(Spain) Alavés	Loan	Undisclosed (Note: Out on loan until 30 June 2020 with an option to buy for an undisclosed amount.)	
18 January 2020	MF	(Netherlands) Noa Lang	(Netherlands) Twente	Loan	Undisclosed	
27 January 2020	FW	(Burkina Faso) Hassane Bandé	(Switzerland) Thun	Loan	Undisclosed	

=== Transfer summary ===
Undisclosed fees are not included in the transfer totals.

Expenditure

Summer: ▼€55,200,000

Winter: ▼€0,000,000

Total: ▼€55,200,000

Income

Summer: ▲€195,400,000

Winter: ▲€5,350,000

Total: ▲€200,750,000

Net totals

Summer: ▲€140,200,000

Winter: ▲€5,350,000

Total: ▲€145,550,000

== Pre-season and friendlies ==
Win Draw Loss Fixtures

25 June 2019	Quick '20 (Netherlands)	2–11	(Netherlands) Ajax	Oldenzaal, Netherlands
19:00 CEST	Zwienenberg 12'; Kemna 38'	Report	Huntelaar 2', 6' (pen.); Leenders 15' (o.g.); Černý 21', 32', 35'; Lang 40'; Jensen 63', 86'; De Wit 68' (pen.); Brobbey 89'	Stadium: Sportpark Vondersweijde

29 June 2019	Ajax (Netherlands)	1–1	(Denmark) Aalborg BK	Oldenzaal, Netherlands
12:00 CEST	Danilo 49'	Report	Van Weert 17'	Stadium: Sportpark Vondersweijde

6 July 2019	Ajax (Netherlands)	5–2	(Belgium) Anderlecht	Amsterdam, Netherlands
14:00 CEST	De Wit 25', 27'; Pierie 48'; Jensen 55'; Huntelaar 61'	Report	Sam 44'; Mbodji 67'	Stadium: Sportpark De Toekomst

14 July 2019	Ajax (Netherlands)	2–1	(Turkey) İstanbul Başakşehir	Mittersill, Austria
18:00 CEST	Dolberg 28'; Huntelaar 71'	Report	Frei 76'	Stadium: Waldstadion Mittersill

18 July 2019	Ajax (Netherlands)	2–1	(England) Watford	Saalfelden, Austria
18:00 CEST	Van de Beek 51'; Timber 89'	Report	Gray 39' (pen.)	Stadium: Sportplatz Bürgerau; Referee: Sebastian Gishamer (Austria)

22 July 2019	Ajax (Netherlands)	6–2	(Greece) OFI Crete	Epe, Netherlands
14:00 CEST	Huntelaar 4', 59'; De Wit 25', 68'; Pierie 57'; Schöne 80'	Report	Semedo 7'; Tsilianidis 56'	Stadium: Sportpark De Wachtelenberg

22 July 2019	Ajax (Netherlands)	1–2	(Greece) Panathinaikos	Amsterdam, Netherlands
19:00 CEST	Van de Beek 25'	Report	Macheda 10', 47'	Stadium: Olympic Stadium; Attendance: 7,000

29 July 2019	Ajax (Netherlands)	1–1	(Turkey) Sivasspor	Lisse, Netherlands
14:00 CEST	Huntelaar 74'	Report	Yandaş 38'	Stadium: Sportpark Ter Specke

3 September 2019	Ajax (Netherlands)	3–3	(Netherlands) Utrecht	Amsterdam, Netherlands
14:00 CEST	Van Gelderen 5'; Eiting 20'; De Jong 50'	Report	Arweiler 27', 37', 90'	Stadium: Sportpark De Toekomst

9 October 2019	Heerenveen (Netherlands)	1–0	(Netherlands) Ajax	Heerenveen, Netherlands
14:30 CEST	Bruijn 15'	Report		Stadium: Abe Lenstra Stadion

13 November 2019	Ajax (Netherlands)	6–1	(Netherlands) Willem II	Amsterdam, Netherlands
14:00 CEST		Report		Stadium: Sportpark De Toekomst

9 January 2020	Ajax (Netherlands)	2–0	(Belgium) KAS Eupen	Al Wakrah, Qatar
17:00 (19:00 AST)	De Jong 20'; Traoré 33'	Report		Stadium: Al Janoub Stadium

11 January 2020	Ajax (Netherlands)	3–1	(Belgium) Club Brugge	Al Wakrah, Qatar
17:00 (19:00 AST)	Kossounou 13' (o.g.); Ziyech 15'; Promes 52'	Report	Van den Keybus 83'	Stadium: Al Janoub Stadium

== Competitions ==
Win Draw Loss Fixtures

=== Overview ===
Competition	First match	Last match	Starting round	Final position	Record							
Competition	First match	Last match	Starting round	Final position	Pld	W	D	L	GF	GA	GD	Win %
Eredivisie	3 August 2019	7 March 2020	Matchday 1	1st (no title awarded)	34	24	5	5	102	30	+72	70.59
KNVB Cup	18 December 2019	4 March 2020	Second round	Semi-finals	4	3	0	1	14	5	+9	75.00
Johan Cruyff Shield	27 July 2019		Final	Winners	1	1	0	0	2	0	+2	100.00
Champions League	6 August 2019	10 December 2019	Third qualifying round	Group stage	10	5	3	2	19	9	+10	50.00
Europa League	20 February 2020	27 February 2020	Round of 32	Round of 32	2	1	0	1	2	3	−1	50.00
Total					51	34	8	9	139	47	+92	66.67

Source: Competitions

=== Eredivisie ===
==== League table ====
Pos	Team	Pld	W	D	L	GF	GA	GD	Pts	Qualification or relegation
1	Ajax	25	18	2	5	68	23	+45	56	Qualification for the Champions League group stage
2	AZ	25	18	2	5	54	17	+37	56	Qualification for the Champions League second qualifying round
3	Feyenoord	25	14	8	3	50	35	+15	50	Qualification for the Europa League group stage
4	PSV Eindhoven	26	14	7	5	54	28	+26	49	Qualification for the Europa League third qualifying round
5	Willem II	26	13	5	8	37	34	+3	44	Qualification for the Europa League second qualifying round

Source: eredivisie.nl
Rules for classification: Season in progress: 1) Most points won; 2) Less points lost; 3) Goal difference; 4) Goals scored; 5) Alphabetical order; End of season: 1) Points; 2) Goal difference; 3) Goals scored; 4) Head-to-head points; 5) Head-to-head goal difference; 6) Head-to-head away goals scored; 7) Play-off if relevant for deciding champion, relegation or participating in a European league, otherwise by draw. 8) Penalty shoot-out (only after a play-off)

==== Results summary ====
Overall								Home						Away					
Pld	W	D	L	GF	GA	GD	Pts	W	D	L	GF	GA	GD	W	D	L	GF	GA	GD
25	18	2	5	68	23	+45	56	11	0	2	40	8	+32	7	2	3	28	15	+13

Source: Eredivisie

==== Results by round ====
Round	1	2	3	4	5	6	7	8	9	10	11	12	13	14	15	16	17	18	19	20	21	22	23	24	25	26	27	28	29	30	31	32	33	34
Ground	A	H	A	H	A	H	A	H	A	A	H	A	H	H	A	H	A	H	H	A	H	A	H	A	H	A	H	A	H	A	H	A	H	A
Result	D	W	W	W	W	W	D	W	W	W	W	W	W	W	W	L	L	W	W	L	W	C	W	L	L	W	C	C	C	C	C	C	C	C
Position	7	3	1	1	1	1	1	1	1	1	1	1	1	1	1	1	1	1	1	1	1	1	1	1	1	1	1	1	1	1	1	1	1	1

Source: KNVB
A = Away; H = Home; W = Win; D = Draw; L = Loss; C = Cancelled

==== Matches ====
3 August 2019 1	Vitesse	2–2	Ajax	Arnhem
18:30 CEST	Bero 13', (yellow card) 23'; Bazoer 55', (yellow card) 82' (yellow-red card) 85'	Report	Van de Beek 30'; Veltman (yellow card) 71'; Tagliafico (yellow card) 73'; Blind (yellow card) 74'; Tadić 75'	Stadium: GelreDome; Attendance: 18,100; Referee: Bas Nijhuis

10 August 2019 2	Ajax	5–0	Emmen	Amsterdam
19:45 CEST	Van de Beek 27'; Ziyech 47'; Tadić 66'; Huntelaar 80', 88'	Report	Bakker (yellow card) 90+2'	Stadium: Johan Cruyff Arena; Attendance: 53,124; Referee: Serdar Gözübüyük

17 August 2019 3	VVV-Venlo	1–4	Ajax	Venlo
19:45 CEST	Van Ooijen (yellow card) 33'; R. Janssen (yellow card) 48'; Linthorst 89'	Report	Martínez (yellow card) 27'; Van de Beek (yellow card) 42'; Ziyech 44'; Tadić 49' (pen.); Huntelaar 66'; Neres 76'	Stadium: De Koel; Attendance: 8,000; Referee: Danny Makkelie

1 September 2019 5	Sparta Rotterdam	1–4	Ajax	Rotterdam
14:30 CEST	Rayhi (yellow card) 52'; Smeets (yellow card) 59'; Dervişoğlu 75'	Report	Promes 25'; Ziyech 31', 60'; Tadić 58' (pen.)	Stadium: Het Kasteel; Attendance: 10,599; Referee: Jochem Kamphuis

14 September 2019 6	Ajax	4–1	Heerenveen	Amsterdam
18:30 CEST	Tadić 14'; Tagliafico (yellow card) 38', (goal) 45+2', 58'; Schuurs 52'	Report	Odgaard 22'; Kongolo (yellow card) 36'	Stadium: Johan Cruyff Arena; Attendance: 52,921; Referee: Allard Lindhout

22 September 2019 7	PSV	1–1	Ajax	Eindhoven
16:45 CEST	Sadílek (yellow card) 35'; Malen 77'	Report	Blind (yellow card) 14'; Álvarez (yellow card) 55'; Promes 63'	Stadium: Philips Stadion; Attendance: 35,000; Referee: Danny Makkelie

25 September 2019 4	Ajax	5–0	Fortuna Sittard	Amsterdam
20:45 CEST	Promes 50', 68', 83', (yellow card) 82'; Neres 53'; Harries 77' (o.g.)	Report	Ciss (yellow card) 76'	Stadium: Johan Cruyff Arena; Attendance: 53,121; Referee: Jeroen Manschot

28 September 2019 8	Ajax	2–0	Groningen	Amsterdam
19:45 CEST	Tagliafico (yellow card) 75'; Martínez 76'; Huntelaar 79'	Report	Te Wierik (yellow card) 6'; Warmerdam (yellow card) 8' (yellow-red card) 73'; Benschop (yellow card) 74'	Stadium: Johan Cruyff Arena; Attendance: 53,228; Referee: Björn Kuipers

6 October 2019 9	ADO Den Haag	0–2	Ajax	The Hague
12:15 CEST	Meijers (yellow card) 37'; Kramer (yellow card) 43'; Bakker (yellow card) 62'	Report	Huntelaar 10'; Promes (yellow card) 35'; Tagliafico (yellow card) 56'; Neres 86'	Stadium: Cars Jeans Stadion; Attendance: 14,733; Referee: Kevin Blom

19 October 2019 10	RKC Waalwijk	1–2	Ajax	Waalwijk
18:30 CEST	Bakari 63'; Spierings (yellow card) 79'	Report	Tadić 46'; Promes 76'	Stadium: Mandemakers Stadion; Attendance: 7,508; Referee: Allard Lindhout

27 October 2019 11	Ajax	4–0	Feyenoord	Amsterdam
16:45 CET	Ziyech 2'; Tagliafico 7'; Neres 37'; Van de Beek 40'	Report		Stadium: Johan Cruyff Arena; Attendance: 53,968; Referee: Serdar Gözübüyük

1 November 2019 12	PEC Zwolle	2–4	Ajax	Zwolle
20:00 CET	Hamer (yellow card) 7', (goal) 35'; Saymak (yellow card) 57', (goal) 62'; Clement (yellow card) 63'	Report	Promes 6', 11'; Neres 20', 88'; Van de Beek (yellow card) 66'	Stadium: MAC³PARK Stadion; Attendance: 14,000; Referee: Björn Kuipers

10 November 2019 13	Ajax	4–0	Utrecht	Amsterdam
12:15 CET	Van de Beek 14', 40'; Tadić 24'; Martínez 66'	Report		Stadium: Johan Cruyff Arena; Attendance: 53,381; Referee: Bas Nijhuis

23 November 2019 14	Ajax	4–1	Heracles Almelo	Amsterdam
19:45 CET	Promes 26', 60'; Labyad 56'; Huntelaar 87'	Report	Dessers 90'	Stadium: Johan Cruyff Arena; Attendance: 53,226; Referee: Dennis Higler

1 December 2019 15	Twente	2–5	Ajax	Enschede
12:15 CET	Schenk (yellow card) 11'; Nakamura 15'; Aitor 19'; Roemeratoe (yellow card) 50'; Selahi (yellow card) 60'	Report	Lang 32', 51', 70'; Tagliafico (yellow card) 42'; Huntelaar 61', 90+6'; Mazraoui (yellow card) 90'; Marin (yellow card) 90+1'	Stadium: De Grolsch Veste; Attendance: 30,000; Referee: Pol van Boekel

6 December 2019 16	Ajax	0–2	Willem II	Amsterdam
20:15 CET	Dest (yellow card) 40'	Report	Llonch (yellow card) 3'; Trésor 42' (pen.); Dankerlui 78'	Stadium: Johan Cruyff Arena; Attendance: 54,022; Referee: Björn Kuipers

15 December 2019 17	AZ	1–0	Ajax	Alkmaar
16:45 CET	Svensson (yellow card) 59'; Clasie (yellow card) 80'; Idrissi (yellow card) 86'; Boadu 90'	Report	Ziyech (yellow card) 69'	Stadium: AFAS Stadion; Attendance: 17,002; Referee: Danny Makkelie

22 December 2019 18	Ajax	6–1	ADO Den Haag	Amsterdam
12:15 CET	Ziyech 15'; Van de Beek 23'; Ekkelenkamp 37'; Gravenberch 39'; Tadić 48'; Traoré 63'; Marin (yellow card) 74'; Hansen (yellow card) 84'; Martínez (yellow card) 90+1'	Report	Bakker (yellow card) 43' (yellow-red card) 80'; Haye (yellow card) 45+1'; Pinas (yellow card) 78'; Summerville (yellow card) 89'; Goossens 90+2' (pen.)	Stadium: Johan Cruyff Arena; Attendance: 53,976; Referee: Dennis Higler

19 January 2020 19	Ajax	2–1	Sparta Rotterdam	Amsterdam
14:30 CET	Van de Beek 15'; Gravenberch 60'; Promes (yellow card) 90+3'	Report	Piroe 74'; Auassar (yellow card) 90+2'	Stadium: Johan Cruyff Arena; Attendance: 53,426; Referee: Allard Lindhout

26 January 2020 20	Groningen	2–1	Ajax	Groningen
14:30 CET	Sierhuis 16'; Lundqvist 52', (yellow card) 56'; Memišević (yellow card) 77'	Report	Tagliafico (yellow card) 38'; Van de Beek 72', (yellow card) 90+5'; Martínez (yellow card) 74'; Traoré (yellow card) 90+2'	Stadium: Hitachi Capital Mobility Stadion; Attendance: 22,315; Referee: Jeroen Manschot

2 February 2020 21	Ajax	1–0	PSV	Amsterdam
16:45 CET	Promes 35'; Tadić (yellow card) 47'	Report	Schwaab (yellow card) 6'	Stadium: Johan Cruyff Arena; Attendance: 53,055; Referee: Björn Kuipers

16 February 2020 23	Ajax	3–0	RKC Waalwijk	Amsterdam
14:30 CET	Tadić 13' (pen.); Eiting (yellow card) 50'; Traoré 52'; Huntelaar 90'	Report	Meulensteen (yellow card) 76'; Gaari (yellow card) 78'	Stadium: Johan Cruyff Arena; Attendance: 53,291; Referee: Dennis Higler

23 February 2020 24	Heracles Almelo	1–0	Ajax	Almelo
16:45 CET	Osman (yellow card) 41'; Dessers 77'; Kiomourtzoglou (yellow card) 82'	Report	Gravenberch (yellow card) 61'; Babel (yellow card) 70'	Stadium: Polman Stadion; Attendance: 12,080; Referee: Pol van Boekel

1 March 2020 25	Ajax	0–2	AZ	Amsterdam
20:00 CET		Report	Boadu 4'; Wijndal (yellow card) 67'; Idrissi 74'; Leeuwin (yellow card) 79'	Stadium: Johan Cruyff Arena; Attendance: 52,707; Referee: Serdar Gözübüyük

7 March 2020 26	Heerenveen	1–3	Ajax	Heerenveen
20:45 CET	Van Bergen 67'; Kongolo (yellow card) 89'	Report	Timber (yellow card) 12'; Tadić 57', 60'; Promes 63'	Stadium: Abe Lenstra Stadion; Attendance: 29,950; Referee: Jeroen Manschot

27	Ajax	Cancelled	Twente	Amsterdam
		Report		Stadium: Johan Cruyff Arena
Note: Match was initially scheduled for 15 March 2020, but cancelled due to the COVID-19 pandemic.

28	Feyenoord	Cancelled	Ajax	Rotterdam
		Report		Stadium: De Kuip
Note: Match was initially scheduled for 22 March 2020, but cancelled due to the COVID-19 pandemic.

29	Ajax	Cancelled	PEC Zwolle	Amsterdam
		Report		Stadium: Johan Cruyff Arena
Note: Match was initially scheduled for 5 April 2020, but cancelled due to the COVID-19 pandemic.

22	Utrecht	Cancelled	Ajax	Utrecht
		Report		Stadium: Stadion Galgenwaard
Note: Match was initially scheduled for 9 April 2020, but cancelled due to the COVID-19 pandemic.

30	Emmen	Cancelled	Ajax	Emmen
		Report		Stadium: De Oude Meerdijk
Note: Match was initially scheduled for 12 April 2020, but cancelled due to the COVID-19 pandemic.

31	Ajax	Cancelled	Vitesse	Amsterdam
		Report		Stadium: Johan Cruyff Arena
Note: Match was initially scheduled for 23 April 2020, but cancelled due to the COVID-19 pandemic.

32	Willem II	Cancelled	Ajax	Tilburg
		Report		Stadium: Koning Willem II Stadion
Note: Match was initially scheduled for 26 April 2020, but cancelled due to the COVID-19 pandemic.

33	Ajax	Cancelled	VVV-Venlo	Amsterdam
		Report		Stadium: Johan Cruyff Arena
Note: Match was initially scheduled for 3 May 2020, but cancelled due to the COVID-19 pandemic.

34	Fortuna Sittard	Cancelled	Ajax	Sittard
		Report		Stadium: Fortuna Sittard Stadion
Note: Match was initially scheduled for 10 May 2020, but cancelled due to the COVID-19 pandemic.

=== KNVB Cup ===
18 December 2019 Second round	Telstar	3–4	Ajax	Velsen-Zuid
18:30 CET	Korpershoek 44'; Benamar 60'; Kharchouch 88'	Report	Lang 25', (yellow card) 67'; Dest 28', 57'; Ekkelenkamp 48'; Huntelaar (yellow card) 90+2'	Stadium: Rabobank IJmond Stadion; Attendance: 4,663; Referee: Joey Kooij

22 January 2020 Round of 16	Ajax	7–0	Spakenburg	Amsterdam
20:45 CET	De Jong 18', 42', 44'; Traoré 49', 52'; Tadić 55'; Ünüvar 86' (pen.)	Report	Van den Houten (yellow card) 52'	Stadium: Johan Cruyff Arena; Attendance: 52,017; Referee: Richard Martens

12 February 2020 Quarter-finals	Vitesse	0–3	Ajax	Arnhem
20:45 CET	Matavž (yellow card) 22' (yellow-red card) 83'; Linssen (yellow card) 90'	Report	Babel (yellow card) 22', (goal) 32'; Van de Beek (yellow card) 39'; Eiting (yellow card) 69'; Gravenberch 76'; Tadić 85' (pen.)	Stadium: GelreDome; Attendance: 18,389; Referee: Bas Nijhuis

4 March 2020 Semi-finals	Utrecht	2–0	Ajax	Utrecht
20:45 CET	Van de Streek 33'; Gustafson 65' (pen.); Klaiber (yellow card) 87'	Report	Huntelaar (yellow card) 72'; Martínez (yellow card) 89'	Stadium: Stadion Galgenwaard; Referee: Björn Kuipers

=== Johan Cruyff Shield ===
27 July 2019 Final	Ajax	2–0	PSV	Amsterdam
18:00 CEST	Dolberg 1'; Blind 53'; Veltman (yellow card) 63'; Dest (yellow card) 78'	Report	Hendrix (yellow card) 21'; Gakpo (yellow card) 45+1'; Luckassen (yellow card) 83'	Stadium: Johan Cruyff Arena; Attendance: 51,837; Referee: Dennis Higler

=== UEFA Champions League ===
==== Third qualifying round ====
The third qualifying round draw was held on 22 July 2019.

6 August 2019 First leg	PAOK (Greece)	2–2	(Netherlands) Ajax	Thessaloniki, Greece
19:00 CEST	Matos (yellow card) 28', (goal) 39'; Akpom 32'	Report	Ziyech 10'; Mazraoui (yellow card) 37'; Huntelaar 57'	Stadium: Toumba Stadium; Attendance: 23,418; Referee: Slavko Vinčić (Slovenia)

13 August 2019 Second leg	Ajax (Netherlands)	3–2 (5–4 agg.)	(Greece) PAOK	Amsterdam, Netherlands
20:30 CEST	Martínez (yellow card) 26'; Tadić (penalty missed) 32', 43' (pen.), 85' (pen.); Dest (yellow card) 60'; Tagliafico 79'; Onana (yellow card) 90+4'	Report	Biseswar 23', 90+3', (yellow card) 79'; Pelkas (yellow card) 30'; El Kaddouri (yellow card) 50'; Paschalakis (yellow card) 55'; Giannoulis (yellow card) 65'; Matos (yellow card) 85'; Crespo (yellow card) 90+5'; Limnios (yellow card) 90+5'	Stadium: Johan Cruyff Arena; Attendance: 53,942; Referee: Craig Pawson (England)

==== Play-off round ====
The play-off round draw was held on 5 August 2019.

20 August 2019 First leg	APOEL (Cyprus)	0–0	(Netherlands) Ajax	Nicosia, Cyprus
21:00 CEST	Gentsoglou (yellow card) 37'; Bezjak (yellow card) 46'	Report	Mazraoui (yellow card) 16' (yellow-red card) 80'; Marin (yellow card) 18'; Veltman (yellow card) 22'; Martínez (yellow card) 57'; Tagliafico (yellow card) 75'; Tadić (yellow card) 84'	Stadium: GSP Stadium; Attendance: 14,549; Referee: Antonio Mateu Lahoz (Spain)

28 August 2019 Second leg	Ajax (Netherlands)	2–0 (2−0 agg.)	(Cyprus) APOEL	Amsterdam, Netherlands
21:00 CEST	Álvarez (yellow card) 25', (goal) 43'; Veltman (yellow card) 45'; Tadić 80'	Report	Mihajlović (yellow card) 30'; Merkis (yellow card) 34'; Lucas (yellow card) 56'; Jakoliš (yellow card) 62'; Joãozinho (yellow card) 69'; Bezjak (yellow card) 73'	Stadium: Johan Cruyff Arena; Attendance: 51,645; Referee: Felix Zwayer (Germany)

==== Group stage ====
Pos	Team	Pld	W	D	L	GF	GA	GD	Pts	Qualification	VAL	CHE	AJX	LIL
1	(Spain) Valencia	6	3	2	1	9	7	+2	11 (Note: Head-to-head points: Valencia 4, Chelsea 1.)	Advance to knockout phase	—	2–2	0–3	4–1
2	(England) Chelsea	6	3	2	1	11	9	+2	11	Advance to knockout phase	0–1	—	4–4	2–1
3	(Netherlands) Ajax	6	3	1	2	12	6	+6	10	Transfer to Europa League	0–1	0–1	—	3–0
4	(France) Lille	6	0	1	5	4	14	−10	1		1–1	1–2	0–2	—

Source: UEFA
Rules for classification: Group stage tiebreakers
Notes:

17 September 2019 1	Ajax (Netherlands)	3–0	(France) Lille	Amsterdam, Netherlands
21:00 CEST	Promes 18'; Onana (yellow card) 39'; Álvarez 50'; Tagliafico 62'	Report	Sanches (yellow card) 39'	Stadium: Johan Cruyff Arena; Attendance: 51,441; Referee: Srđan Jovanović (Serbia)

2 October 2019 2	Valencia (Spain)	0–3	(Netherlands) Ajax	Valencia, Spain
21:00 CEST	Parejo (penalty missed) 25'; Costa (yellow card) 45+1'; Lee Kang-in (yellow card) 72'; Garay (yellow card) 76'	Report	Ziyech 8'; Veltman (yellow card) 12'; Tagliafico (yellow card) 27'; Promes 34', (yellow card) 81'; Martínez (yellow card) 60'; Onana (yellow card) 62'; Van de Beek 67'; Blind (yellow card) 82'	Stadium: Mestalla; Attendance: 44,659; Referee: Daniele Orsato (Italy)

23 October 2019 3	Ajax (Netherlands)	0–1	(England) Chelsea	Amsterdam, Netherlands
18:55 CEST	Tadić (yellow card) 49'; Martínez (yellow card) 65'	Report	Zouma (yellow card) 84'; Batshuayi 86'	Stadium: Johan Cruyff Arena; Attendance: 52,482; Referee: Ovidiu Hațegan (Romania)

5 November 2019 4	Chelsea (England)	4–4	(Netherlands) Ajax	London, England
21:00 CET	Jorginho 5' (pen.), 71' (pen.); Tomori (yellow card) 42'; Azpilicueta (yellow card) 45', (goal) 63'; James 74'	Report	Abraham 2' (o.g.); Promes 20', (yellow card) 62'; Veltman (yellow card) 31' (yellow-red card) 69'; Blind (yellow card) 33' (yellow-red card) 68'; Arrizabalaga 35' (o.g.); Van de Beek 55'	Stadium: Stamford Bridge; Attendance: 39,132; Referee: Gianluca Rocchi (Italy)

27 November 2019 5	Lille (France)	0–2	(Netherlands) Ajax	Villeneuve-d'Ascq, France
21:00 CET	Mandava (yellow card) 29'; Osimhen (yellow card) 37'	Report	Ziyech 2'; Mazraoui (yellow card) 27'; Promes 59'	Stadium: Stade Pierre-Mauroy; Attendance: 48,612; Referee: Felix Brych (Germany)

10 December 2019 6	Ajax (Netherlands)	0–1	(Spain) Valencia	Amsterdam, Netherlands
21:00 CET	Álvarez (yellow card) 10'; Tagliafico (yellow card) 79'; Onana (yellow card) 81'; Van de Beek (yellow card) 83'; Tadić (yellow card) 90+4'	Report	Rodrigo 24'; Doménech (yellow card) 79'; Parejo (yellow card) 81'; Vallejo (yellow card) 86'; Gabriel (red card) 90+3'	Stadium: Johan Cruyff Arena; Attendance: 51,931; Referee: Clément Turpin (France)

=== UEFA Europa League ===
==== Round of 32 ====
20 February 2020 First leg	Getafe (Spain)	2–0	(Netherlands) Ajax	Getafe, Spain
18:55 CET	Deyverson 38'; Djene (yellow card) 44'; Nyom (yellow card) 55'; Olivera (yellow card) 57'; Kenedy 90+3'	Report	Álvarez (yellow card) 36'; Tagliafico (yellow card) 54'; Babel (yellow card) 55'	Stadium: Coliseum Alfonso Pérez; Attendance: 14,039; Referee: Ruddy Buquet (France)

27 February 2020 Second leg	Ajax (Netherlands)	2–1 (2–3 agg.)	(Spain) Getafe	Amsterdam, Netherlands
21:00 CET	Danilo 10', (yellow card) 11'; Olivera 63' (o.g.); Blind (yellow card) 66'; Martínez (yellow card) 76'; Eiting (yellow card) 90+3'; Huntelaar (yellow card) 90+8'	Report	Mata 5', (yellow card) 45+2'; Soria (yellow card) 11'; Arambarri (yellow card) 28'; Nyom (yellow card) 41'	Stadium: Johan Cruyff Arena; Attendance: 51,487; Referee: Anastasios Sidiropoulos (Greece)

== Statistics ==
=== Appearances and goals ===
No.	Pos	Nat	Player	Total		Eredivisie		KNVB Cup Johan Cruyff Shield		Champions League Europa League	
No.	Pos	Nat	Player	Apps	Goals	Apps	Goals	Apps	Goals	Apps	Goals
1	GK	(Portugal) POR	Bruno Varela	3	0	1	0	1	0	1	0
2	DF	(Netherlands) NED	Perr Schuurs	17	1	7+3	1	2	0	3+2	0
3	DF	(Netherlands) NED	Joël Veltman	30	0	19	0	1+1	0	9	0
4	DF	(Mexico) MEX	Edson Álvarez	23	2	6+6	0	3	0	6+2	2
5	DF	(Netherlands) NED	Kik Pierie	0	0	0	0	0	0	0	0
6	MF	(Netherlands) NED	Donny van de Beek	37	10	22+1	8	4	0	10	2
7	FW	(Brazil) BRA	David Neres	20	6	7+5	6	0	0	5+3	0
8	MF	(Netherlands) NED	Carel Eiting	10	0	3+3	0	2+1	0	1	0
9	FW	(Netherlands) NED	Klaas-Jan Huntelaar	32	10	6+12	9	1+3	0	1+9	1
10	FW	(Serbia) SRB	Dušan Tadić	42	16	25	11	5	2	12	3
11	FW	(Netherlands) NED	Quincy Promes	28	16	18+2	12	2	0	5+1	4
12	DF	(Morocco) MAR	Noussair Mazraoui	20	0	9+4	0	1	0	6	0
17	DF	(Netherlands) NED	Daley Blind	34	1	19+1	0	2+1	1	11	0
18	MF	(Romania) ROU	Răzvan Marin	17	0	5+5	0	2+1	0	2+2	0
19	MF	(Morocco) MAR	Zakaria Labyad	3	1	2	1	0	0	1	0
21	DF	(Argentina) ARG	Lisandro Martínez	41	2	24	2	5	0	12	0
22	MF	(Morocco) MAR	Hakim Ziyech	35	9	21	6	1+2	0	11	3
23	FW	(Burkina Faso) BFA	Lassina Traoré	12	4	3+6	2	2	2	1	0
24	GK	(Cameroon) CMR	André Onana	39	0	24	0	4	0	11	0
26	MF	(Netherlands) NED	Jurgen Ekkelenkamp	8	2	1+3	1	2+1	1	0+1	0
28	DF	(United States) USA	Sergiño Dest	35	2	15+5	0	5	2	7+3	0
29	MF	(Netherlands) NED	Ryan Gravenberch	12	3	5+4	2	2	1	1	0
31	DF	(Argentina) ARG	Nicolás Tagliafico	38	5	23+1	3	3	0	11	2
33	GK	(Croatia) CRO	Dominik Kotarski	0	0	0	0	0	0	0	0
35	GK	(Netherlands) NED	Kjell Scherpen	0	0	0	0	0	0	0	0
37	MF	(Netherlands) NED	Naci Ünüvar	1	1	0	0	0+1	1	0	0
40	FW	(Netherlands) NED	Sontje Hansen	2	0	0+1	0	0+1	0	0	0
41	DF	(Netherlands) NED	Jurriën Timber	1	0	1	0	0	0	0	0
47	FW	(Brazil) BRA	Danilo	3	1	0+1	0	0+1	0	1	1
49	FW	(Netherlands) NED	Ryan Babel	9	1	5	0	2	1	2	0
Players sold or loaned out after the start of the season:
15	MF	(Netherlands) NED	Siem de Jong	9	3	1+3	0	1	3	0+4	0
16	DF	(Argentina) ARG	Lisandro Magallán	1	0	0	0	0+1	0	0	0
20	MF	(Denmark) DEN	Lasse Schöne	1	0	0	0	0+1	0	0	0
25	FW	(Denmark) DEN	Kasper Dolberg	3	1	1	0	1	1	1	0
27	MF	(Netherlands) NED	Noa Lang	9	4	2+3	3	1	1	1+2	0
30	MF	(Netherlands) NED	Dani de Wit	2	0	0	0	0	0	0+2	0
32	FW	(Burkina Faso) BFA	Hassane Bandé	0	0	0	0	0	0	0	0
–	FW	(Colombia) COL	Mateo Cassierra	0	0	0	0	0	0	0	0

Last updated: 7 March 2020
Source: Competitions

=== Goalscorers ===
Rank	No.	Pos	Nat	Name	Eredivisie	KNVB Cup Johan Cruyff Shield	Champions League Europa League	Total
1	10	FW	(Serbia)	Dušan Tadić	11	2	3	16
1	11	FW	(Netherlands)	Quincy Promes	12	0	4	16
3	6	MF	(Netherlands)	Donny van de Beek	8	0	2	10
3	9	FW	(Netherlands)	Klaas-Jan Huntelaar	9	0	1	10
5	22	MF	(Morocco)	Hakim Ziyech	6	0	3	9
6	7	FW	(Brazil)	David Neres	6	0	0	6
7	31	DF	(Argentina)	Nicolás Tagliafico	3	0	2	5
8	27	MF	(Netherlands)	Noa Lang	3	1	0	4
8	23	FW	(Burkina Faso)	Lassina Traoré	2	2	0	4
10	15	MF	(Netherlands)	Siem de Jong	0	3	0	3
10	29	MF	(Netherlands)	Ryan Gravenberch	2	1	0	3
12	4	DF	(Mexico)	Edson Álvarez	0	0	2	2
12	21	DF	(Argentina)	Lisandro Martínez	2	0	0	2
12	26	MF	(Netherlands)	Jurgen Ekkelenkamp	1	1	0	2
12	28	DF	(United States)	Sergiño Dest	0	2	0	2
16	2	DF	(Netherlands)	Perr Schuurs	1	0	0	1
16	17	DF	(Netherlands)	Daley Blind	0	1	0	1
16	19	MF	(Morocco)	Zakaria Labyad	1	0	0	1
16	25	FW	(Denmark)	Kasper Dolberg	0	1	0	1
16	37	FW	(Netherlands)	Naci Ünüvar	0	1	0	1
16	47	FW	(Brazil)	Danilo	0	0	1	1
16	49	FW	(Netherlands)	Ryan Babel	0	1	0	1
Own goal					1	0	3	4
Totals					68	16	21	105

Last updated: 7 March 2020

=== Clean sheets ===
Rank	No.	Pos	Nat	Name	Eredivisie	KNVB Cup Johan Cruyff Shield	Champions League Europa League	Total
1	24	GK	(Cameroon)	André Onana	8	2	5	15
2	1	GK	(Portugal)	Bruno Varela	0	1	0	1
Totals					8	3	5	16

Last updated: 7 March 2020

=== Disciplinary record ===
No.	Pos	Nat	Name	Eredivisie			KNVB Cup; Johan Cruyff Shield			Champions League; Europa League			Total		
No.	Pos	Nat	Name	Yellow card	(yellow card) (yellow-red card)	Red card	Yellow card	(yellow card) (yellow-red card)	Red card	Yellow card	(yellow card) (yellow-red card)	Red card	Yellow card	(yellow card) (yellow-red card)	Red card
3	DF	(Netherlands)	Joël Veltman	1	0	0	1	0	0	4	1	0	6	1	0
4	DF	(Mexico)	Edson Álvarez	1	0	0	0	0	0	3	0	0	4	0	0
6	MF	(Netherlands)	Donny van de Beek	3	0	0	1	0	0	1	0	0	5	0	0
8	MF	(Netherlands)	Carel Eiting	1	0	0	1	0	0	1	0	0	3	0	0
9	FW	(Netherlands)	Klaas-Jan Huntelaar	0	0	0	2	0	0	1	0	0	3	0	0
10	FW	(Serbia)	Dušan Tadić	1	0	0	0	0	0	3	0	0	4	0	0
11	FW	(Netherlands)	Quincy Promes	3	0	0	0	0	0	2	0	0	5	0	0
12	DF	(Morocco)	Noussair Mazraoui	1	0	0	0	0	0	3	1	0	4	1	0
17	DF	(Netherlands)	Daley Blind	2	0	0	0	0	0	3	1	0	5	1	0
18	MF	(Romania)	Răzvan Marin	2	0	0	0	0	0	1	0	0	3	0	0
21	DF	(Argentina)	Lisandro Martínez	3	0	0	1	0	0	5	0	0	9	0	0
22	MF	(Morocco)	Hakim Ziyech	1	0	0	0	0	0	0	0	0	1	0	0
23	FW	(Burkina Faso)	Lassina Traoré	1	0	0	0	0	0	0	0	0	1	0	0
24	GK	(Cameroon)	André Onana	0	0	0	0	0	0	4	0	0	4	0	0
27	MF	(Netherlands)	Noa Lang	0	0	0	1	0	0	0	0	0	1	0	0
28	DF	(United States)	Sergiño Dest	1	0	0	1	0	0	1	0	0	3	0	0
29	MF	(Netherlands)	Ryan Gravenberch	1	0	0	0	0	0	0	0	0	1	0	0
31	DF	(Argentina)	Nicolás Tagliafico	6	0	0	0	0	0	4	0	0	10	0	0
40	FW	(Netherlands)	Sontje Hansen	1	0	0	0	0	0	0	0	0	1	0	0
41	DF	(Netherlands)	Jurriën Timber	1	0	0	0	0	0	0	0	0	1	0	0
47	FW	(Brazil)	Danilo	0	0	0	0	0	0	1	0	0	1	0	0
49	FW	(Netherlands)	Ryan Babel	1	0	0	1	0	0	1	0	0	3	0	0
Totals				31	0	0	9	0	0	38	3	0	78	3	0

Last updated: 7 March 2020
