= List of Dutch football transfers winter 2019–20 =

This is a list of Dutch football transfers for the 2019–20 winter transfer window. Only transfers featuring Eredivisie are listed.

== Eredivisie ==
Note: Flags indicate national team as has been defined under FIFA eligibility rules. Players may hold more than one non-FIFA nationality.

=== Ajax ===
In:

No.	Pos.	Nation	Player
49	FW	NED	Ryan Babel (on loan from (Turkey) Galatasaray)

Out:

No.	Pos.	Nation	Player
27	MF	NED	Noa Lang (on loan to Twente)
32	FW	BFA	Hassane Bandé (on loan to (Switzerland) Thun)
—	DF	COL	Luis Manuel Orejuela (to (Brazil) Cruzeiro, previously on loan)
—	FW	NED	Kaj Sierhuis (to (France) Reims, previously on loan at Groningen)

=== PSV Eindhoven ===
In:

No.	Pos.	Nation	Player
68	DF	SUI	Ricardo Rodríguez (on loan from (Italy) Milan)

Out:

No.	Pos.	Nation	Player
1	GK	NED	Jeroen Zoet (on loan to Utrecht)
3	DF	ESP	Toni Lato (loan return to (Spain) Valencia)
10	FW	NED	Steven Bergwijn (to (England) Tottenham Hotspur)
20	MF	URU	Gastón Pereiro (to (Italy) Cagliari)

=== Feyenoord ===
In:

No.	Pos.	Nation	Player
18	MF	TUR	Oğuzhan Özyakup (on loan from (Turkey) Beşiktaş)
19	FW	SVK	Róbert Boženík (from (Slovakia) Žilina)

Out:

No.	Pos.	Nation	Player
1	GK	NED	Kenneth Vermeer (to (United States) Los Angeles)
8	MF	IRL	Liam Kelly (on loan to (England) Oxford United)
18	MF	MAR	Yassin Ayoub (to (Greece) Panathinaikos)
35	MF	NED	Wouter Burger (on loan to Excelsior)
37	MF	NED	Achraf El Bouchataoui (on loan to Dordrecht)

=== AZ Alkmaar ===
In:

No.	Pos.	Nation	Player
18	MF	NOR	Håkon Evjen (from (Norway) Bodø/Glimt)
27	DF	NED	Ramon Leeuwin (from (Denmark) OB)

Out:

No.	Pos.	Nation	Player
23	DF	NED	Léon Bergsma (on loan to Den Bosch)
24	MF	NED	Tijjani Reijnders (on loan to RKC Waalwijk)
54	FW	NGR	Fred Friday (released)
—	FW	NOR	Bjørn Johnsen (to (South Korea) Ulsan Hyundai, previously on loan at (Norway) Rosenborg)

=== Vitesse ===
In:

No.	Pos.	Nation	Player
8	MF	NOR	Sondre Tronstad (from (Norway) Haugesund)
15	FW	NOR	Filip Delaveris (from (Norway) Odd)
28	DF	NED	Joshua Brenet (on loan from (Germany) 1899 Hoffenheim)

Out:

No.	Pos.	Nation	Player
13	FW	ALG	Oussama Darfalou (on loan to Venlo)
24	GK	NED	Jeroen Houwen (on loan to Go Ahead Eagles)
25	MF	NED	Navarone Foor (to (United Arab Emirates) Al-Ittihad Kalba)
33	MF	JPN	Keisuke Honda (to (Brazil) Botafogo)
—	MF	NED	Thomas Bruns (on loan to Venlo, previously on loan at PEC Zwolle)

=== FC Utrecht ===
In:

No.	Pos.	Nation	Player
1	GK	NED	Jeroen Zoet (on loan from PSV)
19	FW	SWE	Kristoffer Peterson (on loan from (England) Swansea City)
20	DF	CMR	Lamine Sané (free agent)

Out:

No.	Pos.	Nation	Player
1	GK	DEN	David Jensen (to (United States) New York Red Bulls)
15	MF	GER	Rico Strieder (on loan to PEC Zwolle)
19	FW	NED	Patrick Joosten (on loan to Sparta Rotterdam)
20	DF	NED	Giovanni Troupée (on loan to Twente)
23	FW	DEN	Simon Makienok (to (Germany) Dynamo Dresden)

=== Heracles Almelo ===
In:

No.	Pos.	Nation	Player
3	DF	ITA	Giacomo Quagliata (from (Italy) Pro Vercelli)
37	FW	NED	Delano Burgzorg (on loan from (Italy) Spezia)

Out:

No.	Pos.	Nation	Player
3	DF	GER	Lennart Czyborra (to (Italy) Atalanta)

=== FC Groningen ===
In:

No.	Pos.	Nation	Player
9	FW	NED	Daishawn Redan (on loan from (Germany) Hertha BSC)
22	DF	TUR	Görkem Can (from (Germany) Schalke 04 II)

Out:

No.	Pos.	Nation	Player
9	FW	NED	Kaj Sierhuis (loan return to Ajax)
20	DF	MAR	Amir Absalem (on loan to Almere City)
22	FW	NED	Michael Breij (to Cambuur)
35	FW	CUW	Charlison Benschop (to (Cyprus) Apollon Limassol)
—	FW	DEN	Jannik Pohl (to (Denmark) Horsens, previously on loan)

=== ADO Den Haag ===
In:

No.	Pos.	Nation	Player
5	MF	ROU	Tudor Băluță (on loan from (England) Brighton & Hove Albion)
12	DF	ENG	Jordan Spence (free agent)
20	MF	ENG	Mark Duffy (on loan from (England) Sheffield United, previously on loan at (England) Stoke City)
21	MF	WAL	George Thomas (on loan from (England) Leicester City)
23	FW	NED	Mick van Buren (on loan from (Czech Republic) Slavia Prague)
24	FW	ENG	Omar Bogle (on loan from (England) Cardiff City)
26	DF	ENG	Sam Stubbs (on loan from (England) Middlesbrough, previously on loan at (Scotland) Hamilton Academical)
28	DF	BEL	Laurens De Bock (on loan from (England) Leeds United, previously on loan at (England) Sunderland)

Out:

No.	Pos.	Nation	Player
6	DF	NED	Donny Gorter (released)
18	GK	NED	Mike Havekotte (on loan to Dordrecht)
20	MF	NED	Thom Haye (on loan to NAC Breda)
23	FW	SWE	Paweł Cibicki (loan return to (England) Leeds United)
25	DF	GHA	Robin Polley (on loan to Dordrecht)
27	DF	NED	Milan van Ewijk (on loan to Cambuur)

=== Willem II ===
In:

No.	Pos.	Nation	Player
23	MF	GER	Görkem Sağlam (from (Germany) VfL Bochum)

Out:

No.	Pos.	Nation	Player
20	FW	FRA	Karim Coulibaly (to (France) Toulon)
27	DF	NED	Victor van den Bogert (on loan to De Graafschap)
28	MF	ECU	Jhonny Quiñónez (loan return to (Ecuador) Aucas)
29	DF	CUW	Justin Ogenia (on loan to FC Eindhoven)

=== SC Heerenveen ===
In:

No.	Pos.	Nation	Player
30	FW	NOR	Runar Espejord (from (Norway) Tromsø)

Out:

No.	Pos.	Nation	Player
4	DF	DEN	Andreas Skovgaard (on loan to (Sweden) Örebro)
7	FW	SRB	Nemanja Mihajlović (to (Poland) Arka Gdynia)
17	FW	DEN	Anders Dreyer (loan return to (England) Brighton & Hove Albion)
22	MF	DEN	Emil Frederiksen (on loan to (Denmark) SønderjyskE)

=== VVV-Venlo ===
In:

No.	Pos.	Nation	Player
18	DF	SUI	Roy Gelmi (on loan from (Switzerland) Thun)
20	MF	NED	Thomas Bruns (on loan from Vitesse, previously on loan at PEC Zwolle)
29	FW	ALG	Oussama Darfalou (on loan from Vitesse)

Out:

No.	Pos.	Nation	Player
9	FW	ITA	Elia Soriano (to (Israel) Hapoel Ra'anana)
18	DF	ISR	Samuel Scheimann (to (Israel) Ironi Kiryat Shmona)
20	DF	NED	Damian van Bruggen (to (Croatia) Inter Zaprešić)

=== PEC Zwolle ===
In:

No.	Pos.	Nation	Player
13	MF	GER	Rico Strieder (on loan from Utrecht)

Out:

No.	Pos.	Nation	Player
11	MF	MAR	Iliass Bel Hassani (to (Qatar) Al-Wakrah)
20	MF	NED	Thomas Bruns (loan return to Vitesse)
29	DF	CUW	Darryl Lachman (to (Israel) Hapoel Ra'anana)

=== FC Emmen ===
In:

No.	Pos.	Nation	Player
5	DF	PER	Miguel Araujo (free agent)
19	MF	NED	Hilal Ben Moussa (from (Romania) Sepsi Sfântu Gheorghe)
29	MF	TUR	Kerim Frei (on loan from (Turkey) İstanbul Başakşehir)
77	FW	SRB	Luka Adžić (on loan from (Belgium) Anderlecht)
—	GK	SWE	Pontus Dahlberg (on loan from (England) Watford)

Out:

No.	Pos.	Nation	Player
29	FW	NED	Luciano Slagveer (to (Hungary) Puskás Akadémia)

=== Fortuna Sittard ===
In:

No.	Pos.	Nation	Player
17	MF	VEN	Carlos Faya (on loan from (Venezuela) Academia Puerto Cabello)
44	DF	GRE	Lazaros Rota (from (Slovakia) Zemplín Michalovce)
52	FW	DEN	Nikolai Frederiksen (on loan from (Italy) Juventus U23)

Out:

No.	Pos.	Nation	Player
16	DF	WAL	Cian Harries (loan return to (England) Swansea City)
21	FW	HUN	Áron Dobos (on loan to (Hungary) Győri ETO)
23	DF	POR	Mica Pinto (to Sparta Rotterdam)
33	FW	ALB	Agim Zeka (loan return to (France) Lille B)

=== FC Twente ===
In:

No.	Pos.	Nation	Player
27	MF	NED	Noa Lang (on loan from Ajax)
28	DF	NED	Giovanni Troupée (on loan from Utrecht)

Out:

No.	Pos.	Nation	Player

=== RKC Waalwijk ===
In:

No.	Pos.	Nation	Player
7	MF	NED	Tijjani Reijnders (on loan from AZ)
10	MF	NED	Richard van der Venne (from Go Ahead Eagles)
25	DF	BUL	Stefan Velkov (on loan from Den Bosch)
27	FW	SWE	Emil Hansson (on loan from (Germany) Hannover 96)

Out:

No.	Pos.	Nation	Player
7	FW	BEL	Dylan Seys (to (Belgium) Mouscron)
10	MF	NED	Stijn Spierings (to (Bulgaria) Levski Sofia)
20	MF	NED	Kevin Vermeulen (to Dordrecht)
25	DF	NED	Dean van der Sluys (to TOP Oss)

=== Sparta Rotterdam ===
In:

No.	Pos.	Nation	Player
11	FW	NED	Patrick Joosten (on loan from Utrecht)
16	DF	POR	Mica Pinto (from Fortuna Sittard)

Out:

No.	Pos.	Nation	Player
9	FW	RSA	Lars Veldwijk (to (South Korea) Jeonbuk Hyundai Motors)
11	FW	TUR	Halil Dervişoğlu (to (England) Brentford)
14	DF	NED	Abdallah Aberkane (to Excelsior)

== See also ==
- 2019–20 Eredivisie
