= Nathan Tjoe-A-On =

Indonesian footballer (born 2001)

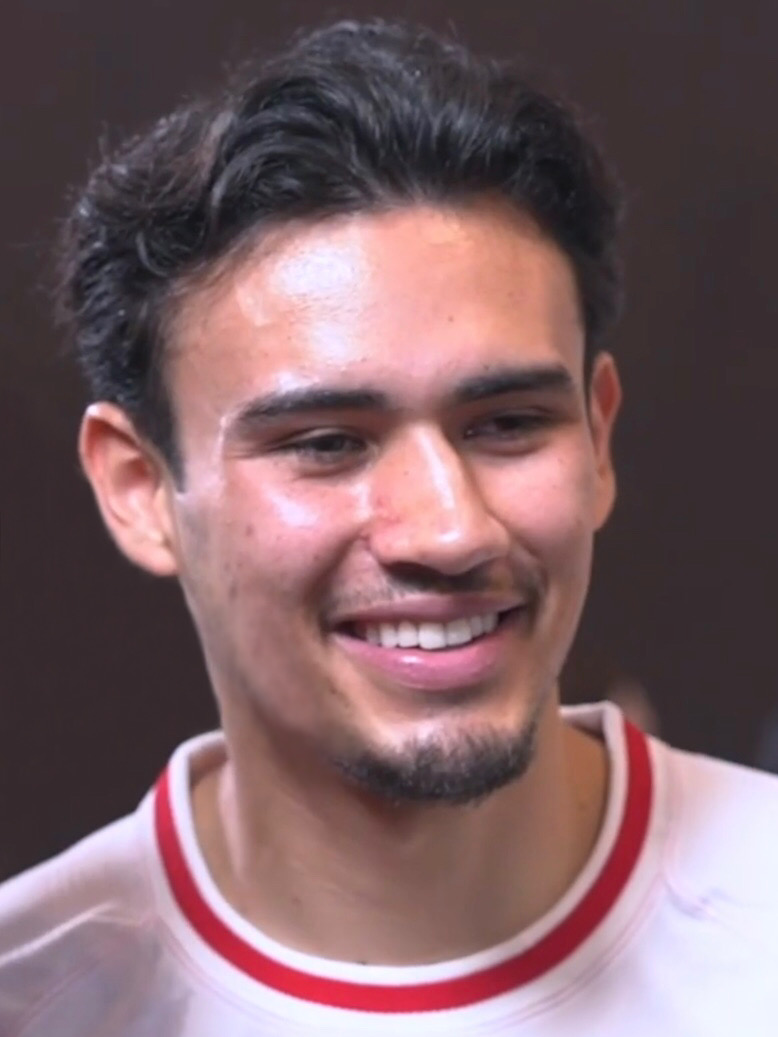
- Tjoe-A-On with Indonesia in 2024

Personal information
- Full name: Nathan Noël Romejo Tjoe-A-On
- Date of birth: 22 December 2001 (age 24)
- Place of birth: Rotterdam, Netherlands
- Height: 1.82 m (6 ft 0 in)
- Positions: Left-back; defensive midfielder

Team information
- Current team: Willem II
- Number: 24

Youth career
- 2010–2013: VV Nieuwerkerk
- 2013–2019: Excelsior

Senior career*
Years	Team	Apps	(Gls)
2019–2023	Excelsior Rotterdam	49	(1)
2023–2025	Swansea City	1	(0)
2024	→ Heerenveen (loan)	4	(0)
2025–	Willem II	45	(0)

International career^{‡}
2024	Indonesia U23	7	(0)
2024–	Indonesia	19	(0)
Medal record
Men's football
Representing Indonesia
FIFA ASEAN Cup
Winner	2026 Indonesia	Team
FIFA Series
Runner-up	2026 Indonesia
- * Club domestic league appearances and goals as of 22 November 2026 ‡ National team caps and goals as of 28 September 2026

Nathan Noël Romejo Tjoe-A-On (Indonesian pronunciation: [ˌt͡ʃuˈaon] choo-ah-on; born 22 December 2001) is a professional footballer who plays as a left-back or defensive midfielder for Eredivisie club Willem II. Born in the Netherlands, he represents the Indonesia national team.

== Club career ==
=== Excelsior ===
Tjoe-A-On was signed to a three-year contract with Excelsior in 2019, after developing through their youth system. However, injuries stunted his development and he lost around 14 months of playing and training time. After the 2021–22 winter break he returned to action and gained confidence in his ability and felt able to do himself justice on the football field again.

Following their promotion from the Eerste Divisie at the end of the 2021–22 season he received a contract extension in June 2022, for an additional two years. He made his Eredivisie debut for Excelsior on 12 August 2022 against SC Cambuur at Cambuur Stadion in a 2–0 victory. On 9 September 2022, he scored his first professional league goal, helping Excelsior to a 2–1 win over FC Emmen.

=== Swansea City ===
On 13 August 2023, Tjoe-A-On signed for Championship club Swansea City for an undisclosed fee on a three-year deal.

==== Loan to Heerenveen ====
On 25 January 2024, Tjoe-A-On went to Heerenveen on loan from Swansea City for the rest of the 2023–24 season. On 11 February 2024, Tjoe-A-On made his debut as a substitute in a 3–2 win against Ajax.

==== Return to Swansea City ====
On 13 August 2024, Tjoe-A-On made his senior debut for The Swans in the EFL Cup first round match against Gillingham in a 3–1 win.

On 17 August 2024, Tjoe-A-On made his league debut as a substitute in a 3–0 win against Preston North End, thus becoming the first Indonesian to play in the EFL Championship.

=== Willem II ===
On 21 July 2025, Tjoe-A-On officially signed with Eerste Divisie club Willem II on a two-years contract.

== International career ==
In October 2023, Tjoe-A-On confirmed that he had decided to represent Indonesia at international level.

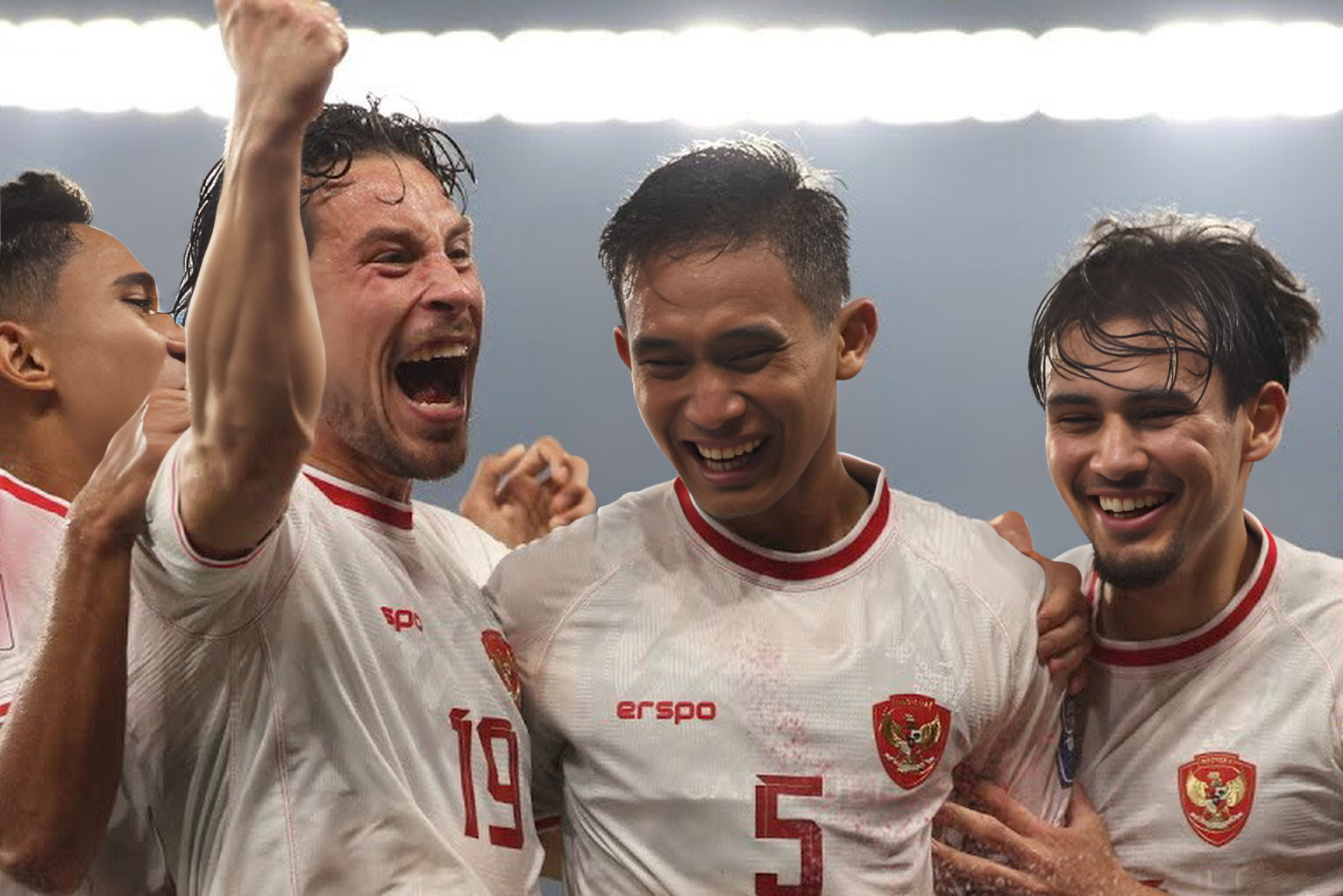
Tjoe-A-On (right) celebrates his goal for Indonesia during a match against the Philippines in 2024

On 7 March 2024, Tjoe-A-On received a call-up to the Indonesia national team for the 2026 FIFA World Cup qualifiers match against Vietnam on 21 March and 26 March 2024. On 21 March 2024, he made his international debut for Indonesia in a 1–0 win against Vietnam.

In April 2024, Tjoe-A-On was named in the Indonesia U23 final squad for the 2024 AFC U-23 Asian Cup held in Qatar. He was initially only allowed to play in the group stage and return to the Netherlands afterward. However, his club Heerenveen allowed him to return to Qatar and play in the quarter-finals.

== Personal life ==
Born in the Netherlands, Tjoe-A-On is of Surinamese and Indonesian descent.

On 11 March 2024, Tjoe-A-On officially obtained Indonesian citizenship.

== Career statistics ==
=== Club ===
As of match played 22 November 2026

Appearances and goals by club, season and competition
Club	Season	League			National cup		League cup		Continental		Other		Total	
Club	Season	Division	Apps	Goals	Apps	Goals	Apps	Goals	Apps	Goals	Apps	Goals	Apps	Goals
Excelsior	2019–20	Eerste Divisie	0	0	0	0	–		–		0	0	0	0
Excelsior	2020–21	Eerste Divisie	10	0	1 (Note: Appearances in KNVB Cup)	0	–		–		0	0	11	0
Excelsior	2021–22	Eerste Divisie	10	0	0	0	–		–		6 (Note: Appearance(s) in promotion/relegation play-offs)	0	16	0
Excelsior	2022–23	Eredivisie	29	1	1	0	–		–		0	0	30	1
Excelsior	Total		49	1	2	0	0	0	0	0	6	0	57	1
Swansea City	2023–24	Championship	0	0	0	0	0	0	–		0	0	0	0
Swansea City	2024–25	Championship	1	0	0	0	2 (Note: Appearance(s) in EFL Cup)	0	–		0	0	3	0
Heerenveen (loan)	2023–24	Eredivisie	4	0	0	0	–		–		0	0	4	0
Willem II	2025–26	Eerste Divisie	32	0	2	1	–		–		3	0	37	1
Willem II	2026–27	Eredivisie	13	0	1	0	–		–		–		14	0
Willem II	Total		45	0	3	1	0	0	0	0	3	0	51	1
Career total			100	1	5	1	2	0	0	0	9	0	115	2

=== International ===
As of match played 28 September 2026

Appearances and goals by national team and year
National team	Year	Apps	Goals
Indonesia	2024	11	0
Indonesia	2025	3	0
Indonesia	2026	5	0
Total		19	0

== Honours ==
Indonesia

- FIFA ASEAN Cup: 2026

Individual

- Eredivisie Talent of the Month: September 2022

== See also ==
- List of Indonesia international footballers born outside Indonesia
