= Schloesser =

Schloesser is a German surname, an orthographic variant of Schlösser, maning "locksmith". Notable people with the surname include:

- Gabriela Schloesser (born 1994), Mexican-Dutch archer
- Jeffrey J. Schloesser, United States Army general
- Mike Schloesser (born 1994), Dutch compound archer
