= Schlösser =

Schlösser is a German surname meaning "locksmith". Notable persons with that name include:

- Karl Schlösser (1912–1982), German international footballer
- Louis Schlösser (1800–1886), German violinist and composer
- Pepijn Schlösser (born 1998), Dutch footballer
- Rainer Schlösser (1899–1945), German journalist and writer

== Double surnames ==
- Hans Müller-Schlösser (1884–1956), German poet and playwright
- Rose Marie Antoinette Blommers-Schlösser (born 1944), Dutch herpetologist and entomologist
