= Frenk Keukens =

Dutch footballer (born 1995)

Personal information
- Full name: Frenk Keukens
- Date of birth: 24 August 1995 (age 31)
- Place of birth: Leuth, Netherlands
- Height: 1.82 m (6 ft 0 in)
- Position: Right-back

Team information
- Current team: Kozakken Boys
- Number: 2

Youth career
- De Treffers

Senior career*
Years	Team	Apps	(Gls)
2013–2016	De Treffers	92	(3)
2016–2019	TOP Oss	1	(0)
2018–2019	→ De Treffers (loan)	32	(0)
2019–	Kozakken Boys	111	(4)
- * Club domestic league appearances and goals as of 09:45, 2 June 2024 (UTC)

Frenk Keukens (born 24 August 1995) is a Dutch footballer who plays as a right back for Tweede Divisie club Kozakken Boys.

== Career ==
Keukens played for De Treffers in the Topklasse and the Tweede Divisie from 2014 to 2017. In 2017, he moved to FC Oss on a free, making his debut in a KNVB Cup match against Almere City on 19 September. He was a starter in the –-2 loss, and was replaced in the 72nd minute by Erik Quekel. In the 2018–19 season, Keukens played on loan at De Treffers. On 19 January 2019, it was confirmed that Keukens would join Kozakken Boys for the 2019–20 season.
