= Siebe Horemans =

Belgian footballer (born 1998)

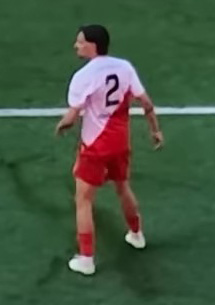
- Horemans playing for Utrecht in 2025

Personal information
- Full name: Siebe Horemans
- Date of birth: 2 June 1998 (age 28)
- Place of birth: Geel, Belgium
- Height: 1.86 m (6 ft 1 in)
- Position: Right-back

Team information
- Current team: Utrecht
- Number: 2

Youth career
- 2013–2016: Gent

Senior career*
Years	Team	Apps	(Gls)
2016–2019	Gent	1	(0)
2017	→ OH Leuven (loan)	7	(1)
2018–2019	→ Excelsior (loan)	9	(0)
2019–2024	Excelsior	167	(9)
2024–	Utrecht	65	(1)

International career
2013–2014	Belgium U16	6	(0)
2015	Belgium U17	6	(0)
2016	Belgium U18	1	(0)
2016	Belgium U19	1	(0)
- * Club domestic league appearances and goals as of 18 October 2026

Siebe Horemans (born 2 June 1998) is a Belgian professional footballer who plays as a right-back for Eredivisie club Utrecht.

== Club career ==
=== Gent ===
Horemans is a youth exponent from Gent. He made his senior debut on 4 August 2016 in the UEFA Europa League against Viitorul Constanța. Gent manager Hein Vanhaezebrouck gave him a spot in his starting line-up. Horemans made his debut in the domestic league later that month, on 21 August in the home match against Westerlo, which was won 4–2.

On 31 January 2017, Gent announced that Horemans, together with Lucas Schoofs, was sent on loan to second division club OH Leuven for the remainder of the season to get some first team experience.

At the start of the 2017–18 season, Horemans returned to Gent. His contract was also extended by two years until 2020. At the beginning of 2018, he suffered an anterior cruciate ligament injury, which required surgery and sidelined him for six months.

=== Excelsior ===
In the 2018–19 season, Horemans played on loan for Eredivisie club Excelsior. After a long injury, Horemans made his debut for the club on 3 February 2019 in a Rotterdam derby against Feyenoord, which resulted in a surprising 2–1 win. Despite only making 11 total appearances for the club that season due to a lingering injury, as Excelsior suffered relegation to the Eerste Divisie, Horemans was signed on a permanent deal in July 2019.

== International career ==
Horemans played for several Belgium national youth teams. He was part of the national under-17 squad at the 2015 UEFA European Under-17 Championship, but failed to make an appearance.

== Career statistics ==
As of match played 18 October 2026

Appearances and goals by club, season and competition
Club	Season	League			National cup		Europe		Other		Total	
Club	Season	Division	Apps	Goals	Apps	Goals	Apps	Goals	Apps	Goals	Apps	Goals
Gent	2016–17	Belgian Pro League	1	0	0	0	1 (Note: Appearances in UEFA Europa League)	0	—		2	0
OH Leuven (loan)	2016–17	Challenger Pro League	7	1	0	0	—		—		7	1
Excelsior (loan)	2018–19	Eredivisie	9	0	0	0	—		2 (Note: Appearances in relegation play-offsEredivisie Relegation playoffs)	0	11	0
Excelsior	2019–20	Eerste Divisie	25	0	1	0	—		—		26	0
Excelsior	2020–21	Eerste Divisie	38	2	4	1	—		—		42	3
Excelsior	2021–22	Eerste Divisie	36	1	2	0	—		6 (Note: Appearances in Eerste Divisie Promotion playoffs)	0	44	1
Excelsior	2022–23	Eredivisie	34	3	2	0	—		—		36	3
Excelsior	2023–24	Eredivisie	34	3	3	1	—		4	0	41	4
Excelsior	Total		167	9	12	2	—		10	0	189	11
Utrecht	2024–25	Eredivisie	29	1	4	0	—		—		33	1
Utrecht	2025–26	Eredivisie	27	0	2	0	12	2	1 (Note: Appearance in European play-offs)	0	42	2
Utrecht	2026–27	Eredivisie	9	0	0	0	—		—		9	0
Utrecht	Total		65	1	6	0	12	2	1	0	84	3
Career total			249	10	18	2	13	0	13	0	293	15
