= 2003–04 Eerste Klasse =

Eerste Klasse
- Season: 2003–4
- Relegated: 2004–05 Tweede Klasse

2003–04 Eerste Klasse was a Dutch association football season of the Eerste Klasse.

Saturday champions were:

- A: RKAV Volendam
- B: BVV Barendrecht
- C: Kozakken Boys
- D: Excelsior '31
- E: ONS Sneek

Sunday champions were:

- A: DWV
- B: UVS Leiden
- C: VV Geldrop
- D: EVV Echt
- E: VV Germania
- F: WKE '16
