= List of Dutch football transfers summer 2019 =

This is a list of Dutch football transfers for the 2019 summer transfer window. Only transfers featuring Eredivisie are listed.

== Eredivisie ==
Note: Flags indicate national team as has been defined under FIFA eligibility rules. Players may hold more than one non-FIFA nationality.

=== ADO Den Haag ===
In:

No.	Pos.	Nation	Player
—	DF	NED	Milan van Ewijk (from Excelsior Maassluis)

Out:

No.	Pos.	Nation	Player

=== Ajax ===
In:

No.	Pos.	Nation	Player
—	MF	ROU	Răzvan Marin (from (Belgium) Standard Liège)
—	DF	NED	Kik Pierie (from Heerenveen)
—	GK	NED	Kjell Scherpen (from Emmen)
—	DF	ARG	Lisandro Martínez (from (Argentina) Defensa y Justicia)

Out:

No.	Pos.	Nation	Player
21	MF	NED	Frenkie de Jong (to (Spain) Barcelona)
—	DF	AUT	Maximilian Wöber (to (Spain) Sevilla, previously on loan)
—	DF	NED	Matthijs de Ligt (to (Italy) Juventus)
—	ST	DEN	Kasper Dolberg (to (France) OGC Nice)

=== AZ Alkmaar ===
In:

No.	Pos.	Nation	Player

Out:

No.	Pos.	Nation	Player

=== FC Emmen ===
In:

No.	Pos.	Nation	Player

Out:

No.	Pos.	Nation	Player
1	GK	NED	Peter van der Vlag (retired)
2	DF	NED	Stef Gronsveld (to Dordrecht)
12	GK	NED	Kjell Scherpen (to Ajax)
14	MF	BEL	Jason Bourdouxhe (to TOP Oss)
18	MF	NED	Emil Bijlsma (to Hoogeveen)
29	DF	GER	Nico Neidhart (to (Germany) Hansa Rostock)

=== FC Groningen ===
In:

No.	Pos.	Nation	Player
14	FW	MAR	Mohamed El Hankouri (from Feyenoord, previously on loan)
—	MF	SWE	Gabriel Gudmundsson (from (Sweden) Halmstad)

Out:

No.	Pos.	Nation	Player
6	MF	NED	Ludovit Reis (to (Spain) Barcelona B)
10	FW	MAR	Mimoun Mahi (to (Switzerland) Zürich)
16	GK	BEL	Kevin Begois (retired)
24	DF	GER	Jeff Chabot (to (Italy) Sampdoria)
—	FW	NED	Ahmad Mendes Moreira (released, previously on loan at Telstar)

=== FC Twente ===
In:

No.	Pos.	Nation	Player
—	DF	ESP	Julio Pleguezuelo (from (England) Arsenal U23)

Out:

No.	Pos.	Nation	Player

=== FC Utrecht ===
In:

No.	Pos.	Nation	Player
—	MF	NED	Justin Lonwijk (from Jong PSV)
—	FW	GHA	Abass Issah (on loan from (Germany) Mainz 05)

Out:

No.	Pos.	Nation	Player

=== Feyenoord ===
In:

No.	Pos.	Nation	Player
21	GK	NED	Nick Marsman (from (Netherlands) FC Utrecht)
36	FW	SWE	Emil Hansson (from (Netherlands) RKC Waalwijk) (return from loan)
20	MF	PER	Renato Tapia (from (Netherlands) Willem II) (return from loan)
41	FW	NED	Crysencio Summerville (from (Netherlands) FC Dordrecht) (return from loan)
7	FW	NED	Luciano Narsingh (from (England) Swansea City)
8	MF	IRL	Liam Kelly (from (England) Reading F.C.)
19	MF	NED	Leroy Fer (from (England) Swansea City)
27	DF	NED	Rick Karsdorp (from (Italy) AS Roma) (on loan)
14	DF	SCO	George Johnston (from (England) FC Liverpool)
32	DF	POR	Edgar Ié (from (Turkey) Trabzonspor) (on loan)

Out:

No.	Pos.	Nation	Player
10	MF	NED	Tonny Vilhena (to (Russia) FC Krasnodar)
13	GK	FRA	Joris Delle (to (South Africa) Orlando Pirates F.C.)
30	GK	NED	Ramón ten Hove ( (Netherlands) FC Dordrecht) (on loan)
--	DF	NED	Noah Lewis ( (Netherlands) FC Dordrecht) (on loan)
--	DF	NED	Ian Smeulers ( (Netherlands) FC Dordrecht) (on loan)
8	MF	NED	Jordy Clasie (to (England) Southampton F.C.) (return from loan)
24	DF	CUW	Cuco Martina (to (England) Everton F.C.) (return from loan)
--	FW	NED	Joël Zwarts (to (Netherlands) Excelsior)
32	FW	NED	Robin van Persie (Retired)
4	DF	NED	Jerry St. Juste (to (Germany) 1. FSV Mainz 05)
29	DF	NED	Calvin Verdonk (to (Netherlands) FC Twente) (on loan)
36	FW	SWE	Emil Hansson (to (Germany) Hannover 96)
26	MF	NED	Jordy Wehrmann (to (Netherlands) FC Dordrecht) (on loan)
34	FW	NED	Dylan Vente (to (Netherlands) RKC Waalwijk) (on loan)

=== Fortuna Sittard ===
In:

No.	Pos.	Nation	Player
—	MF	NED	Nassim El Ablak (from Fortuna Sittard youth)
—	MF	GRE	Dimitrios Ioannidis (from Fortuna Sittard youth)

Out:

No.	Pos.	Nation	Player
15	MF	NED	Calvin Mac-Intosch (to Cambuur)
30	DF	VEN	Rubén Ramírez (to Atlético Venezuela)

=== Heracles Almelo ===
In:

No.	Pos.	Nation	Player
—	DF	NED	Navajo Bakboord (from Jong Ajax)

Out:

No.	Pos.	Nation	Player
17	MF	CUW	Brandley Kuwas (to (United Arab Emirates) Al-Nasr)

=== PEC Zwolle ===
In:

No.	Pos.	Nation	Player
5	DF	NED	Kenneth Paal (from PSV Eindhoven, previously on loan)

Out:

No.	Pos.	Nation	Player
1	GK	NED	Diederik Boer (retired)
16	GK	NED	Mickey van der Hart (to (Poland) Lech Poznań)
20	DF	NED	Kingsley Ehizibue (to (Germany) 1. FC Köln)
21	MF	DEN	Younes Namli (to (Russia) Krasnodar)
—	MF	SWE	Erik Israelsson (to (Norway) Vålerenga, previously on loan)

=== PSV Eindhoven ===
In:

No.	Pos.	Nation	Player

Out:

No.	Pos.	Nation	Player
3	DF	AUS	Aziz Behich (to (Turkey) İstanbul Başakşehir)
—	DF	NED	Kenneth Paal (to PEC Zwolle, previously on loan)

=== RKC Waalwijk ===
In:

No.	Pos.	Nation	Player
—	DF	NED	Dean van der Sluys (from TOP Oss)
—	DF	NED	Teun van Grunsven (from Oss '20)
—	FW	BEL	Lennerd Daneels (from Jong PSV)

Out:

No.	Pos.	Nation	Player
17	FW	NED	Roland Bergkamp (to Katwijk)

=== SC Heerenveen ===
In:

No.	Pos.	Nation	Player
—	MF	NED	Hamdi Akujobi (from Heerenveen youth)

Out:

No.	Pos.	Nation	Player
5	DF	NED	Kik Pierie (to Ajax)
6	MF	NED	Stijn Schaars (retired)
8	MF	NOR	Morten Thorsby (to (Italy) Sampdoria)

=== Sparta Rotterdam ===
In:

No.	Pos.	Nation	Player
—	FW	NED	Denzel James (from Noordwijk)

Out:

No.	Pos.	Nation	Player

=== Vitesse ===
In:

No.	Pos.	Nation	Player

Out:

No.	Pos.	Nation	Player
6	DF	NED	Arnold Kruiswijk (retired)

=== VVV-Venlo ===
In:

No.	Pos.	Nation	Player
—	MF	GER	Richard Neudecker (from (Germany) FC St. Pauli)
—	FW	ITA	Elia Soriano (from (Poland) Korona Kielce)
—	DF	GER	Steffen Schäfer (from (Germany) 1. FC Magdeburg)
—	GK	GER	Thorsten Kirschbaum (from (Germany) Bayer Leverkusen)

Out:

No.	Pos.	Nation	Player

=== Willem II ===
In:

No.	Pos.	Nation	Player
10	FW	GRE	Vangelis Pavlidis (from (Germany) VfL Bochum, previously on loan)
—	MF	GER	Mats Köhlert (from (Germany) Hamburger SV II)

Out:

No.	Pos.	Nation	Player
—	GK	NED	Mattijs Branderhorst (to NEC, previously on loan)
