= Kozakken Boys =

Dutch football club based in Werkendam

- Full name: Kozakken Boys
- Founded: 13 April 1932; 94 years ago
- Ground: De Zwaaier, Werkendam
- Capacity: 3,000
- Chairman: Dick Hoogendoorn
- Manager: Hans de Jong
- League: Tweede Divisie
- 2025–26: Tweede Divisie, 9th of 18
Home colours	Away colours

Kozakken Boys (Dutch pronunciation: [koːˈzɑkə(m) ˈbɔis]) is a Dutch football club based in Werkendam. It competes in the Tweede Divisie, the third tier, and highest amateur league of Dutch football.

Formed as Steeds Voorwaarts Werkendam (SVW) in 1932, it adopted its current name in 1935. Kozakken Boys was named after the Don Cossack troops, who liberated Werkendam from French occupation in 1813. One of the most prominent amateur clubs in the Netherlands, the club experienced a surge towards the higher divisions of Dutch football in the 2010s, reaching promotion to the third-tier Tweede Divisie in 2016. Kozakken Boys have won the top amateur division for Saturday clubs six times: in 1985, 1991, 1992, 1993, 1995 and 2015.

The club has played at its current home ground De Zwaaier since 2001. Before, Kozakken Boys played at the grounds Kozakkenstoep and, between 1959 and 2001, at De Vierlaan.

== History ==
=== Early history (1932–1940) ===
The first organised football to be played in Werkendam took place during the era of mobilisation between 1914 and 1918 by soldiers stationed in the village. It was not until some time later, in 1924, that the first football club was founded: Werkendamse Voetbal Vereniging (WVV). Shortly afterwards, other football clubs such as Door Vrienden Opgericht (DVO), Samenspel Overwint Werkendam (SOW) and Excelsior were founded, but the majority of these clubs quickly disappeared. In those years, the clubs had difficulty retaining members, as a large part of the population worked outside in the Biesbosch National Park and were away from home for weeks.

On 13 April 1932, Steeds Voorwaarts Werkendam (SVW) was founded to create a second club in Werkendam as a counterpart to DVO. When SVW transferred from the Brabantsche Voetbalbond (BVB) to the Royal Dutch Football Association (KNVB) in 1935, a club with that name already appeared to exist in Gorinchem, so that the name was changed from SVW to Kozakken Boys that year. The name was chosen as a tribute to the "Kozakstoep", a local site along the Merwede where the football club often played its matches. The site owes its name to the Don Cossacks, who crossed the Merwede River at that place in 1813 as they freed Werkendam from French occupation during the Napoleonic Wars.

In 1939, WVV ceased to exist, after which a large part of the members moved their affiliation to Kozakken Boys. Since then, the club has been the only football club in Werkendam.

=== Rising through the amateur tiers (1940–1970) ===
Until the Second World War, Kozakken Boys played within the amateur divisions of the Brabantsche Voetbalbond (BVB) and later the KNVB. From 1940, clubs from the highest level of the BVB were promoted to the Vierde Klasse of the KNVB. The rise started from 1945 and onwards, as Kozakken Boys steadily worked their way up from the Vierde Klasse Saturday amateurs to the highest amateur level in successive decades.

=== Years in the Eerste Klasse (1970–1996) ===
From the 1970–71 season, the Eerste Klasse was introduced to amateur football, in which Kozakken Boys were present from the beginning. In this period, the first championship in the highest tier was won in the 1984–85 season. In this season, it competed with SV Spakenburg and GVVV for the overall Eerste Klasse Saturday title. Kozakken Boys and Spakenburg ended even and a decider was needed. In the end, Spakenburg won the overall Saturday title in the last minutes which a 3–2 score, after a half-hour delay, while two players from both teams were sent off.

Another notable season was 1989–90, which ended in a disappointing 14th place, after which relegation to the Tweede Klasse became a fact, effectively ending Kozakken Boys run in the highest amateur division. In the following 1990–91 season, however, it won the Tweede Klasse title and achieved promotion back to the Eerste Klasse. Immediately afterwards, the positive trend continued and Kozakken Boys won Eerste Klasse championships in 1992, 1993 and 1995. The overall Saturday title, however, was not won during this period.

=== Hoofdklasse era (1996–2010) ===
In the 1996–97 season, the Hoofdklasse division was introduced by merging the three Eerste Klasse division into one overall top amateur tier. Kozakken Boys participated in this competition until the 2002–03 season, as that season ended in 14th position and subsequent relegation to the Eerste Klasse became a fact. As with the relegation in the 1989–90 season, it returned to the highest amateur division after one season, as a title was immediately celebrated in the following season.

Kozakken Boys also participated in the national cup competition, the KNVB Cup several times during this period. It played home matches against Dutch footballing juggernauts PSV Eindhoven and Ajax in the second round of the competition in the 2006–07 season and 2007–08 season, respectively. In the latter, Kozakken Boys managed to draw the match into extra time, in which it eventually lost 1–2.

The 2009–10 season ended in 8th position, which meant promotion to newly introduced top amateur level, the Topklasse, was not achieved. Therefore, Kozakken Boys would initially continue to play in the Dutch Hoofdklasse, the second highest amateur level.

=== In the Topklasse (2010–2016) ===
Kozakken Boys' aimed to achieve promotion to the Topklasse as quickly as possible. This struggle lasted two seasons, as the 2011–12 season turned out to be very successful. The regular season in the Hoofdklasse B group ended in second place, missing the league title by one point behind SVV Scheveningen. Until the last day matchday, Scheveningen and ASWH competed with Kozakken Boys for the title, where all three teams won their game and the championship was ultimately celebrated in Scheveningen. The initial disappointment was quickly overcome by winning the KNVB District Cup South I for the first time in club history. As a crowning achievement for the season, promotion to the Topklasse was won in the play-offs, which meant that Kozakken Boys were represented in the highest amateur division again from the 2012–13 season.

The 2014–15 season turned out to be a historic one for Kozakken Boys. Under the leadership of coaches Arie Schep, Danny Buijs and Ton Cornelissen, the club won the Topklasse Saturday. This made the club the overall Saturday amateur champion of the Netherlands for the first time in its existence.

During this period, the club participated in the national KNVB Cup several times, with the highlight was reaching the round of 16 in the 2015–16 season, the furthest the club ever made it in the tournament. Kozakken Boys were eventually knocked out by Eredivisie club AZ, who beat them 1–3 by deciding the game in the final 10 minutes.

=== Reaching the Tweede Divisie (2016) ===
From the 2016–17 season, the KNVB revived the formerly defunct Tweede Divisie, with the top seven clubs from the 2015–16 Topklasse Saturday automatically qualifying. With a fourth place, Kozakken Boys were among these teams and therefore played in the Dutch third-tier from 2016.

On 24 August 2016, Kozakken Boys qualified for the main tournament of the 2016–17 KNVB Cup by winning 1–5 over AFC. In the first round, Kozakken Boys had managed to win 3–0 over second-tier Eerste Divisie club Helmond Sport on 20 September 2016. At a packed Sportpark de Zwaaier, thanks to goals from Raily Ignacio, Gwaeron Stout and Everton Pires Tavares delivered a win.

In the second round of the KNVB Cup, Kozakken Boys were drawn against to Ajax, nine years after their first matchup. On 26 October 2016, it lost 1–6 to Ajax.

In the 2016–17 season, Kozakken Boys finished 2nd in the league, losing the title by 19 points to Jong AZ.

In the 2017–18 season, Kozakken Boys went into the final matchday in 2nd place, and hosted league leaders Katwijk. A win would've gave Kozakken Boys the title, but a 0–0 draw meant that Katwijk were crowned champions and Kozakken Boys again finished 2nd.

=== Relegation to the Derde Divisie and return (2021–25) ===
In 2021–22 Kozakken Boys finished 16th and entered the relegation play-offs. They beat Sportlust '46 4–1 on aggregate, defeated DVS '33 3–2 on aggregate, and overcame fellow Tweede Divisie side GVVV 7–2 on aggregate in the final to retain their status.

The club finished 13th in 2022–23 season, surviving by a point, but placed 17th in the 2023–24 season and again entered the play-offs. They were eliminated by Blauw Geel '38 on penalties after a 3–3 aggregate draw and were relegated to the fourth tier, the Derde Divisie.

Kozakken Boys competed in the 2024–25 Derde Divisie B. In May 2025, they won the third period title to qualify for the promotion play-offs, and on 14 June overturned a 1–0 first-leg defeat by beating Noordwijk 4–0 at home to secure promotion back to the Tweede Divisie for the 2025–26 season. Ahead of the new season the club appointed former player Hans de Jong as head coach, succeeding Edwin Grünholz.

On 18 October 2025, following a 1–2 home defeat to Spakenburg, Spakenburg forward Ahmed El Azzouti reported racist abuse during the match and he and relatives were confronted by a group of Kozakken Boys supporters after the game; police escorted the visiting team bus to the motorway. The KNVB announced an investigation, and Kozakken Boys' board issued a statement condemning racism, discrimination and misconduct.

== Players ==
=== Current squad ===
As of 26 October 2026

Note: Flags indicate national team as defined under FIFA eligibility rules; some limited exceptions apply. Players may hold more than one non-FIFA nationality.

No.	Pos.	Nation	Player
1	GK	NED	Ramón ten Hove
2	DF	NED	Frenk Keukens
3	DF	NED	Storm Hop
4	DF	BOE	Shedwin Martina
5	DF	NED	Sam Soetens
6	DF	NED	Tom Sas
7	FW	DJI	Mouad Hassan
8	MF	NED	Damian Timan
9	FW	NED	Dion Versluis
11	FW	NED	Sidi Jalloh
12	MF	NED	Gwaeron Stout

No.	Pos.	Nation	Player
14	FW	BIH	Marko Maletić
15	FW	NED	Milan van den Berg
16	GK	NED	Joey Koorevaar
17	DF	NED	Dyland Pedro
18	MF	NED	Yassir Taytay
19	FW	NED	Johnny Lommers
20	DF	NED	Damian den Besten
21	FW	NED	Zenya Deurloo
23	DF	NED	Jesse Giebels
24	MF	NED	Grad Damen

== Honours ==
=== League ===
- Topklasse/Derde Divisie
  - Winners: 2014–15
- Hoofdklasse
  - Winners (4): 1984–85, 1991–92, 1992–93, 1994–95
- Eerste Klasse
  - Winners (2): 1990–91, 2003–04
- Tweede Klasse
  - Winners (2): 1956–57, 1960–61
- Derde Klasse
  - Winners (2): 1947–48, 1954–55
- Vierde Klasse
  - Winners: 1945–46

=== Cup ===
- KNVB District Cup South I
  - Winners: 2011–12
