= Joerie Church =

English-born Dutch footballer

Personal information
- Date of birth: 23 March 1998 (age 28)
- Place of birth: Redhill, England
- Height: 1.77 m (5 ft 10 in)
- Position: Defender

Youth career
- –2009: VIOS-W
- 2009–2017: AZ Alkmaar

Senior career*
| Years | Team | Apps | (Gls) |
| 2016–2020 | Jong AZ | 72 | (3) |
| 2020–2021 | SV Rödinghausen | 3 | (0) |
| 2021–2024 | HHC Hardenberg | 61 | (2) |
- * Club domestic league appearances and goals

Joerie Church (born 23 March 1998) is an English-born Dutch former professional footballer who played as a defender.

== Career ==
Church made his Eerste Divisie debut for Jong AZ on 18 August 2017 in a game against FC Den Bosch. He retired in 2024 at amateur side HHC Hardenberg after suffering from a concussion in a game against FC Lisse.
