= Dean van der Sluys =

Dutch footballer (born 1995)

Personal information
- Date of birth: 29 August 1995 (age 31)
- Place of birth: Oss, Netherlands
- Height: 1.72 m (5 ft 8 in)
- Position: Left-back

Team information
- Current team: Kozakken Boys

Youth career
- RKSV Margriet
- FC Oss
- –2014: Den Bosch

Senior career*
Years	Team	Apps	(Gls)
2014–2019	TOP Oss	106	(4)
2019	RKC Waalwijk	0	(0)
2020	TOP Oss	9	(0)
2020–2022	Helmond Sport	71	(1)
2022–2023	TOP Oss	30	(0)
2023	Jerv	7	(0)
2024–2025	De Treffers	29	(0)
2025–	Kozakken Boys	13	(0)
- * Club domestic league appearances and goals as of 16:10, 4 March 2026 (UTC)

Dean van der Sluys (born 29 August 1995) is a Dutch professional footballer who plays as a left-back for Tweede Divisie club Kozakken Boys.

== Club career ==
Van der Sluys made his professional debut in the Eerste Divisie for TOP Oss on 23 November 2014 in a game against Sparta Rotterdam.

In July 2019, he signed for RKC Waalwijk, who had recently been promoted to the Eredivisie. In the first half of the season he failed to make an appearance, and as a result he returned to TOP Oss in January 2020, where he signed for six months until June 2020.

On 9 July 2020, Van der Sluys signed for Eerste Divisie club Helmond Sport on a two-year contract. He made his league debut on 29 August 2020 in a 2–1 win over his former club TOP Oss away at Frans Heesen Stadion. Van der Sluys scored his first goal for Helmond Sport in an Eerste Divisie fixture against Excelsior on 28 March 2021, a 3–0 win.

On 23 July 2022, Van der Sluys returned to TOP Oss on a two-year contract. Thirteen months later, he moved abroad for the first time, to Norwegian second-tier club FK Jerv.

Van der Sluys joined Tweede Divisie club De Treffers on 1 February 2024, ending his professional career.

On 23 January 2025, Van der Sluys signed with Kozakken Boys, starting from the 2025–26 season.
