= Alessandro Damen =

Dutch footballer (born 1990)

Personal information
- Date of birth: 17 May 1990 (age 36)
- Place of birth: Nieuwegein, Netherlands
- Height: 1.88 m (6 ft 2 in)
- Position: Goalkeeper

Youth career
- 1996–2009: De Meern

Senior career*
Years	Team	Apps	(Gls)
2009–2014	De Meern		
2014–2021	Excelsior	97	(0)
2021–2022	Heracles Almelo	0	(0)
2022	→ ADO Den Haag (loan)	8	(0)
2022–2024	Spakenburg	62	(0)
- * Club domestic league appearances and goals

Alessandro Damen (born 17 May 1990) is a Dutch former professional footballer who played as a goalkeeper.

== Club career ==
Damen joined Excelsior from amateur side De Meern in 2014, after being scouted by Marinus Dijkhuizen. He had a terrible start to his stint at the club, and was ruled out for successive seasons after suffering serious injuries on both knees. After returning to the pitch in August 2017, he suffered another knee injury on 26 August 2017 in a game against Heracles Almelo, ruling him out for the rest of the season.

On 4 August 2021, he signed with Heracles Almelo for the 2021–22 season. On 31 January 2022, Damen was loaned to ADO Den Haag.

On 2 June 2022, Damen signed with Tweede Divisie club Spakenburg.

On 9 January 2024, Damen announced his retirement from football at the end of the 2023–24 season to focus on his civil career at Utrecht Performance Centre and his family life. He won the Tweede Divisie title with Spakenburg in his final season.

== Honours ==
Spakenburg

- Tweede Divisie: 2023–24
