= Pepijn Schlösser =

Dutch footballer (born 1998)

Personal information
- Date of birth: 14 February 1998 (age 28)
- Place of birth: Hoensbroek, Netherlands
- Height: 1.77 m (5 ft 10 in)
- Position: Right-back

Team information
- Current team: KFC Uerdingen 05
- Number: 2

Youth career
- VV Amstenrade
- Roda JC Kerkrade

Senior career*
Years	Team	Apps	(Gls)
2018–2021	Roda JC Kerkrade	38	(0)
2021–2022	KFC Uerdingen 05	26	(1)
2022–2023	Alemannia Aachen	2	(0)
2023–	KFC Uerdingen 05	14	(0)
- * Club domestic league appearances and goals as of 15:56, 27 January 2024 (UTC)

Pepijn Schlösser (born 14 February 1998) is a Dutch footballer who plays as a right-back for German club KFC Uerdingen 05.

== Club career ==
He made his Eerste Divisie debut for Roda JC Kerkrade on 5 October 2018 in a game against Jong PSV as a 78th-minute substitute for Henk Dijkhuizen.

In August 2021 he joined German side KFC Uerdingen 05.
