= Stijn Meijer =

Dutch footballer (born 1999)

Personal information
- Date of birth: 28 November 1999 (age 26)
- Place of birth: Aalsmeer, Netherlands
- Height: 1.90 m (6 ft 3 in)
- Position: Forward

Team information
- Current team: Hamrun Spartans
- Number: 99

Youth career
- RKAV
- –2015: RODA '23
- 2015–2016: Utrecht
- 2016–2017: Twente
- 2017: Lugo
- 2018: Willem II

Senior career*
Years	Team	Apps	(Gls)
2018–2019	Almere City	30	(6)
2018–2019	Jong Almere City	5	(2)
2019–2021	Excelsior	39	(7)
2021–2022	Dordrecht	33	(11)
2022–2023	PEC Zwolle	0	(0)
2023	→ SC Verl (loan)	11	(1)
2023–2024	Al Shahaniya	8	(2)
2024–2025	FC U Craiova	14	(4)
2025–	Hamrun Spartans	15	(0)
- * Club domestic league appearances and goals as of 7 May 2026

Stijn Meijer (born 28 November 1999) is a Dutch professional footballer who plays as a forward for Maltese Premier League club Hamrun Spartans.

== Career ==
Meijer made his Eerste Divisie debut for Almere City on 20 August 2018 in a game against Jong AZ, as a starter, and scored on his debut.

On 9 July 2021, he joined Dordrecht.

On 31 August 2022, Meijer signed a two-year contract with PEC Zwolle. On 1 February 2023, Meijer joined SC Verl in Germany on loan. His contract with PEC Zwolle was terminated by mutual consent on 12 July 2023.

On 12 September 2024, Meijer signed a two-year deal with Liga II club FC U Craiova.

== Honours ==
Al Shahaniya

- Qatar FA Cup runner-up: 2024
