= Damian Timan =

Dutch footballer

Personal information
- Date of birth: 5 March 2001 (age 25)
- Place of birth: Nieuw-Vennep, the Netherlands
- Height: 1.79 m (5 ft 10 in)
- Position: Midfielder

Youth career
- –2008: V.V. Wilhelmina Boys
- 2008–2922: PSV

Senior career*
Years	Team	Apps	(Gls)
2020–2022	Jong PSV	30	(1)
2022–2024	Jong Cambuur	9	(0)
2024	Grótta	12	(4)
2025	Katwijk	9	(0)

International career^{‡}
2015–2016	Netherlands U15	6	(1)
2016–2017	Netherlands U16	6	(1)
2017	Netherlands U17	2	(0)
2018–2019	Netherlands U18	5	(0)
2019	Netherlands U19	2	(0)
- * Club domestic league appearances and goals as of 2 November 2024 ‡ National team caps and goals as of 13:17, 15 September 2020 (UTC)

Damian Timan (born 5 March 2001) is a Dutch footballer who most recently played as a midfielder for Katwijk in the Dutch Tweede Divisie.

Timan left Katwijk by mutual consent in the summer of 2025.

== Career statistics ==
=== Club ===
As of 15 September 2020.

Club	Season	League			Cup		Continental		Other		Total	
Club	Season	Division	Apps	Goals	Apps	Goals	Apps	Goals	Apps	Goals	Apps	Goals
Jong PSV	2019–20	Eerste Divisie	1	0	–		–		0	0	1	0
Jong PSV	2020–21	Eerste Divisie	3	1	–		–		0	0	3	1
Career total			4	1	0	0	0	0	0	0	4	1
