= Abdallah Aberkane =

Dutch footballer (born 2000)

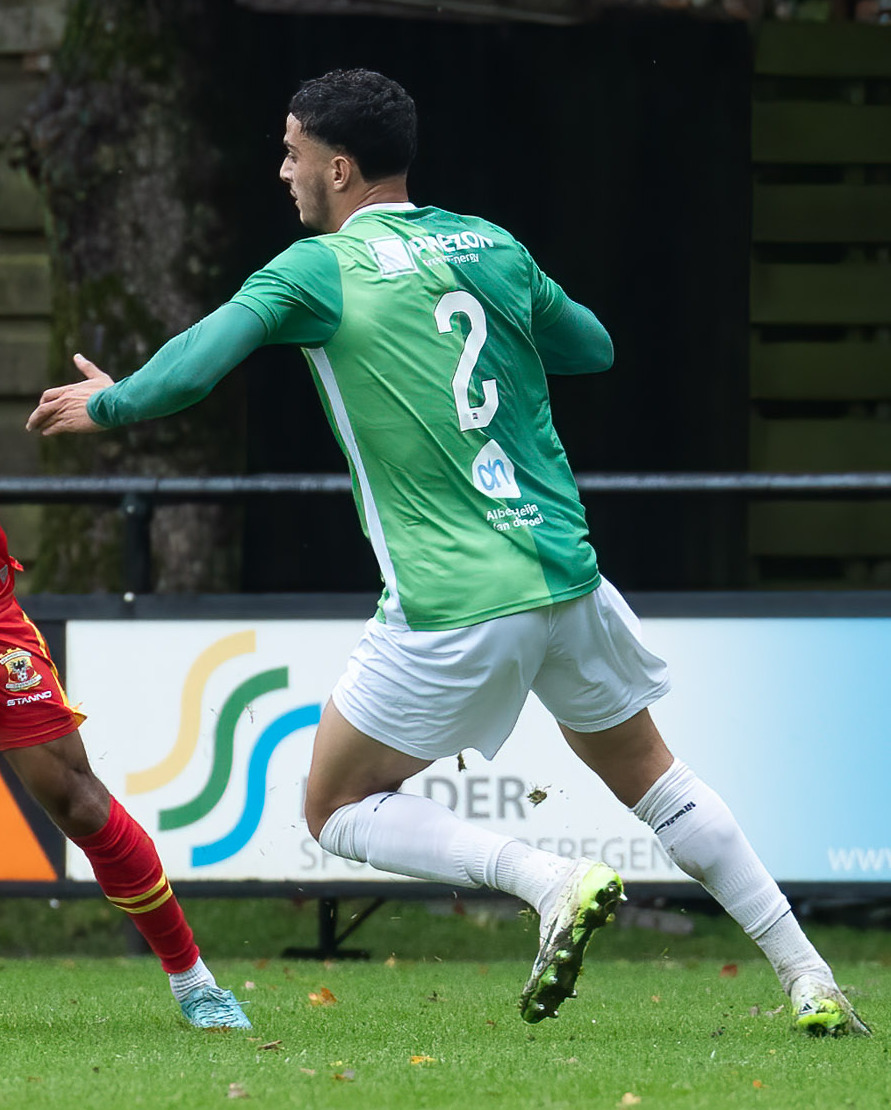
- Aberkane in 2023

Personal information
- Date of birth: 5 May 2000 (age 26)
- Place of birth: Gouda, Netherlands
- Height: 1.81 m (5 ft 11 in)
- Position: Centre-back

Team information
- Current team: Vyškov

Youth career
- 2007–2012: SV Gouda
- 2012–2013: CVV de Jodan Boys
- 2013–2016: ADO Den Haag
- 2016–2019: Ajax

Senior career*
Years	Team	Apps	(Gls)
2018–2019	Jong Ajax	4	(0)
2019–2020	Sparta Rotterdam	1	(0)
2019–2020	Jong Sparta Rotterdam	13	(0)
2020–2022	Excelsior	53	(1)
2023	Dordrecht	27	(0)
2024–	Vyškov	12	(0)

International career
2014	Netherlands U15	1	(0)
2015	Netherlands U16	5	(0)
- * Club domestic league appearances and goals as of 10:44, 6 June 2024 (UTC)

Abdallah Aberkane (born 5 May 2000) is a Dutch professional footballer, who plays as a centre back for Czech National Football League club Vyškov.

== Club career ==
Aberkane made his Eerste Divisie debut for Jong Ajax on 10 September 2018 in a game against Jong AZ, as a 65th-minute substitute for Dean Solomons.

In 2019, Aberkane signed for Sparta Rotterdam on an amateur deal. He started playing for the reserve team of Jong Sparta in the Tweede Divisie and even made one appearance for the first team in the Eredivisie; on 21 December 2019 as a late substitute for Dirk Abels in a 3–0 win over AZ.

In January 2020, Aberkane joined city rivals Excelsior where he signed a contract until 2022.

On 19 January 2023, Aberkane signed for Dordrecht on an eighteen-month contract.

On 27 February 2024, Aberkane signed a contract with Czech National Football League club Vyškov.

== Personal life ==
Aberkane was born in the Netherlands to Moroccan parents.
