= 2018–19 Excelsior Rotterdam season =

Dutch football club season

Excelsior Rotterdam
2018–19 season
- Stadium: Van Donge & De Roo Stadion
- Eredivisie: 16th (Note: Relegated to Eerste Divisie via play-offs.)
- KNVB Cup: 1st round
- Top goalscorer: League: Elías Már Ómarsson (8 goals); All: Elías Már Ómarsson, Luigi Bruins (8 goals)
- Highest home attendance: 4,400 (12th, 14th, 19th, 20th, 24th 28th weeks & Play-off 2nd game)
- Lowest home attendance: 1,902 (KNVB Cup 1st round)
- Average home league attendance: 4,118
- Biggest win: 2-0 (NAC Breda (a) 3rd week); SBV Vitesse (h) 9th weekDe Graafschap (h) 19th week)
- Biggest defeat: 7-1 (AFC Ajax (h) 12th week); 6-0 (PSV Eindhoven (a) 15th week)
- All statistics correct as of 29 June 2025.

The 2018–19 season was Excelsior Rotterdam's 22nd season in the Eredivisie (5th consecutive). The club concluded the season in 16th place and was subsequently relegated to the Eerste Divisie following a play-off defeat to RKC Waalwijk, with an aggregate score of 3–2.

The club also competed in the KNVB Cup, where they were eliminated in the first round following a 3–2 extra-time defeat to NEC Nijmegen.

Elías Már Ómarsson (8 Eredivisie) and Luigi Bruins (7 Eredivisie, 1 KNVB Cup) were the top scorers of the club in this season with 8 goals.

Jeffry Fortes and Jurgen Mattheij were the most appeared players in this season with 35 appearances; 34 appearances in the Eredivisie and 1 appearance in the KNVB Cup.

== Players ==
=== First-team squad ===
Note: Flags indicate national team as defined under FIFA eligibility rules; some limited exceptions apply. Players may hold more than one non-FIFA nationality.

No.	Pos.	Nation	Player
1	GK	NED	Alessandro Damen
2	DF	BEL	Siebe Horemans
3	DF	BEL	Hervé Matthys
4	DF	NED	Thomas Oude Kotte
5	DF	NED	Robin van der Meer
6	MF	NED	Jerdy Schouten
7	FW	NED	Anouar Hadouir
8	MF	SUR	Ryan Koolwijk
9	FW	ISL	Elías Már Ómarsson
10	MF	NED	Luigi Bruins
11	FW	GER	Dennis Eckert
11	MF	BEL	Jinty Caenepeel

No.	Pos.	Nation	Player
14	MF	MAR	Ali Messaoud
15	DF	NED	Jurgen Mattheij
17	MF	TUR	Dogucan Haspolat
18	FW	ENG	Marcus Edwards
19	MF	ISL	Mikkel Anderson
20	GK	NED	Sonny Stevens
22	DF	CPV	Jeffry Fortes
24	FW	MKD	Denis Mahmudov
28	DF	NED	Lorenzo Burnet
32	FW	CUW	Carlito Fermina
34	FW	MAR	Mounir El Hamdaoui
35	FW	MAR	Redouan El Hankouri

== Transfers ==
=== In ===
Pos.	Player	Transferred from	Fee	Date
FW	(North Macedonia) Denis Mahmudov	(Netherlands) FC Dordrecht	Free`	1 July 2018
MF	(Netherlands) Jerdy Schouten	(Netherlands) SC Telstar	€300,000	1 July 2018
DF	(Netherlands) Robin van der Meer	(Netherlands) FC Utrecht	Free	1 July 2018
GK	(Netherlands) Sonny Stevens	(Netherlands) Go Ahead Eagles	Free	1 July 2018
DF	(Netherlands) Thomas Oude Kotte	(Netherlands) SBV Vitesse U21	Free	1 July 2018
DF	(Belgium) Hervé Matthys	(Netherlands) FC Eindhoven		14 July 2018
FW	(Iceland) Elías Már Ómarsson	(Sweden) IFK Göteborg	€300,000	10 August 2018
DF	(Belgium) Siebe Horemans	(Belgium) KAA Gent	On loan	13 August 2018
FW	(England) Marcus Edwards	(England) Tottenham Hotspur F.C. U23	On loan	30 August 2018
FW	(Morocco) Mounir El Hamdaoui	Without Club		20 September 2018
FW	(Germany) Dennis Eckert	(Spain) Celta de Vigo	On loan	31 January 2019

=== Out ===
Pos.	Player	Transferred to	Fee	Date
DF	(Netherlands) Jordy de Wijs	(Netherlands) PSV Eindhoven	End of loan	30 June 2018
FW	(Trinidad and Tobago) Levi García	(Netherlands) AZ Alkmaar	End of loan	30 June 2018
DF	(Belgium) Wout Faes	(Belgium) R.S.C. Anderlecht	End of loan	30 June 2018
FW	(Morocco) Zakaria El Azzouzi	(Netherlands) Jong Ajax	End of loan	30 June 2018
MF	(Netherlands) Hicham Faik	(Belgium) Zulte Waregem	Free	1 July 2018
MF	(Netherlands) Kevin Vermeulen	(Netherlands) RKC Waalwijk	Free	1 July 2018
MF	(Netherlands) Khalid Karami	(Netherlands) SBV Vitesse	Free	1 July 2018
FW	(Netherlands) Mike van Duinen	(Netherlands) PEC Zwolle	€750,000	1 July 2018
DF	(Netherlands) Milan Massop	(Belgium) S.K. Beveren	Free	1 July 2018
DF	(United States) Shane O'Neill	(United States) Orlando City SC	Free	10 July 2018
GK	(Iceland) Ögmundur Kristinsson	(Greece) Athlitiki Enosi Larissa F.C.	Free	2 August 2018
FW	(Netherlands) Stanley Elbers	(Netherlands) PEC Zwolle	Free	14 August 2018
GK	(Netherlands) Theo Zwarthoed	(Netherlands) NAC Breda	Free	27 August 2018
DF	(United States) Desevio Payne	(Netherlands) FC Emmen	Free	7 January 2019

== Competitions ==
=== Overall record ===
Competition	First match	Last match	Starting round	Final position	Record							
Competition	First match	Last match	Starting round	Final position	Pld	W	D	L	GF	GA	GD	Win %
Eredivisie	11 August 2018	15 May 2019	Week 1	16th	34	9	6	19	46	79	−33	26.47
Promotion/Relegation playoffs	19 May 2019	22 May 2019	2nd round	2nd round	2	0	1	1	2	3	−1	0.00
KNVB Cup	25 September 2018	25 September 2018	1st round	1st round	1	0	0	1	2	3	−1	0.00
Total					37	9	7	21	50	85	−35	24.32

Source: ESPN

=== Eredivisie ===
==== League table ====
Pos	Team	Pld	W	D	L	GF	GA	GD	Pts	Qualification or relegation
14	Emmen	34	10	8	16	41	72	−31	38	
15	Fortuna Sittard	34	9	7	18	50	80	−30	34	
16	Excelsior (R)	34	9	6	19	46	79	−33	33	Qualification for the Relegation play-offs (Note: Ten teams, two from the Eredivisie and eight from the Eerste Divisie, play for two spots in the 2019–20 Eredivisie. The remaining eight teams play in the 2019–20 Eerste Divisie.)
17	De Graafschap (R)	34	8	5	21	38	75	−37	29	Qualification for the Relegation play-offs
18	NAC Breda (R)	34	5	8	21	29	74	−45	23	Relegation to Eerste Divisie

Source: eredivisie.nl
Rules for classification: Season in progress: 1) Most points won; 2) Less points lost; 3) Goal difference; 4) Goals scored; 5) Alphabetical order; End of season: 1) Points; 2) Goal difference; 3) Goals scored; 4) Head-to-head points; 5) Head-to-head goal difference; 6) Head-to-head away goals scored; 7) Play-off if relevant for deciding champion, relegation or participating in a European league, otherwise by draw. 8) Penalty shoot-out (only after a play-off)
(R) Relegated
Notes:

Ten teams, two from the Eredivisie and eight from the Eerste Divisie, played for two spots in the 2019–20 Eredivisie, the remaining eight teams playing in the 2019–20 Eerste Divisie.

First round
NEC	2	0	2
RKC Waalwijk	0	3	3
SC Cambuur	2	2	4
Almere City	2	1	3

Second round
RKC Waalwijk	2	1	3
Excelsior	1	1	2
Go Ahead Eagles	2	1	3
FC Den Bosch	2	0	2
TOP Oss	0	0	0
Sparta Rotterdam	2	3	5
SC Cambuur	1	0	1
De Graafschap	1	2	3

Third round
RKC Waalwijk*	0	5	5
Go Ahead Eagles	0	4	4
Sparta Rotterdam*	1	2	3
De Graafschap	2	0	2

Key: * = Play-off winners, (a) = Wins because of away goals rule, (e) = Wins after extra time in second leg, (p) = Wins after penalty shoot-out.

==== Results summary ====
Overall								Home						Away					
Pld	W	D	L	GF	GA	GD	Pts	W	D	L	GF	GA	GD	W	D	L	GF	GA	GD
34	9	6	19	41	79	−38	33	6	4	7	25	36	−11	3	2	12	16	43	−27

Source: https://www.espn.nl/voetbal/stand/_/competitie/NED.1/season/2018

==== Results by round ====
Round	1	2	3	4	5	6	7	8	9	10	11	12	13	14	15	16	17	18	19	20	21	22	23	24	25	26	27	28	29	30	31	32	33	34
Ground	H	A	A	H	A	H	H	A	H	A	H	H	A	H	A	A	H	A	H	H	A	H	A	H	A	H	A	H	A	A	H	A	A	H
Result	D	L	W	L	D	D	W	L	W	L	L	L	W	D	L	L	L	L	W	W	L	W	D	L	L	L	L	L	L	L	D	L	W	W
Position																																		16

Source: ESPN
A = Away; H = Home; W = Win; D = Draw; L = Loss

=== Matches ===
==== 1st half ====
11 August 2018 1st week	Excelsior Rotterdam	1-1	Fortuna Sittard	Rotterdam
20:45	Jurgen Mattheij 32'	Report	Jorrit Smeets 53'	Stadium: Van Donge & De Roo Stadion; Attendance: 4,250

19 August 2018 2nd week	Feyenoord	3-0	Excelsior Rotterdam	Rotterdam
14:30	Robin van Persie 17'; Jerry St. Juste 77'; Jan-Arie van der Heijden 89'	Report		Stadium: De Kuip; Attendance: 45,000

25 August 2018 3rd week	NAC Breda	0-2	Excelsior Rotterdam	Breda
20:45		Report	Ali Messaoud 15'; Jeffry Fortes 54'	Stadium: Rat Verlegh Stadion; Attendance: 18,227

1 September 2018 4th week	Excelsior Rotterdam	2-4	ADO Den Haag	Rotterdam
19:45	Mikkel Anderson 70'; Denis Mahmudov 72'	Report	Abdenasser El Khayati 21' (pen.) 45+1' 65' 69'	Stadium: Van Donge & De Roo Stadion; Attendance: 3,940

15 September 2018 5th week	Willem II Tilburg	2-2	Excelsior Rotterdam	Tilburg
20:45	Fran Sol 86'; Kristofer Kristinsson 88'	Report	Mikkel Anderson 70'; Denis Mahmudov 72'	Stadium: Koning Willem II Stadion; Attendance: 11,894

22 September 2018 6th week	Excelsior Rotterdam	3-3	SC Heerenveen	Rotterdam
19:45	Ali Messaoud 12' 51'; Luigi Bruins 42'	Report	Davy Bulthuis 49'; Morten Thorsby 59'; Jizz Hornkamp 90+2'	Stadium: Van Donge & De Roo Stadion; Attendance: 4,008

29 September 2018 7th week	Excelsior Rotterdam	1-0	VVV-Venlo	Rotterdam
20:45	Elías Már Ómarsson 20'	Report		Stadium: Van Donge & De Roo Stadion; Attendance: 4,106

6 October 2018 8th week	PEC Zwolle	2-0	Excelsior Rotterdam	Zwolle
19:45	Mike van Duinen 23'; Thomas Lam 55'	Report		Stadium: MAC³PARK Stadion; Attendance: 13,562

20 October 2018 9th week	Excelsior Rotterdam	2-0	SBV Vitesse	Rotterdam
18:30	Max Clark 40' (o.g.); Jurgen Mattheij 70'	Report		Stadium: Van Donge & De Roo Stadion; Attendance: 4,397

27 October 2018 10th week	De Graafschap	4-1	Excelsior Rotterdam	Doetinchem
19:45	Daryl van Mieghem 25'; Furdjel Narsingh 50'; Youssef El Jebli 55'; Fabian Serrarens 70'	Report	Elías Már Ómarsson 38'	Stadium: De Vijverberg; Attendance: 12,108

2 November 2018 11th week	Excelsior Rotterdam	2-4	FC Groningen	Rotterdam
20:00	Ryan Koolwijk 36'; Luigi Bruins 59' (pen.)	Report	Mimoun Mahi 26'; Ritsu Doan 29'; Mateo Casierra 51'; Jannik Pohl 75'	Stadium: Van Donge & De Roo Stadion; Attendance: 4,257

11 November 2018 12th week	Excelsior Rotterdam	1-7	AFC Ajax	Rotterdam
14:30	Ali Messaoud 52'	Report	Donny van de Beek 31' 48'; Lasse Schöne 44'; Kasper Dolberg 58'; Jerdy Schouten 71' (o.g.); Hakim Ziyech 79'; David Neres 87'	Stadium: Van Donge & De Roo Stadion; Attendance: 4,400

25 November 2018 13th week	FC Emmen	1-2	Excelsior Rotterdam	Emmen
12:15	Anco Jansen 47'	Report	Ali Messaoud 60'; Ryan Koolwijk 89'	Stadium: De Oude Meerdijk; Attendance: 8,021

30 November 2018 14th week	Excelsior Rotterdam	3-3	FC Utrecht	Rotterdam
20:00	Elías Már Ómarsson 6'; Ryan Koolwijk 8'; Luigi Bruins 26' (pen.)	Report	Gyrano Kerk 55'; Nick Venema 61'; Simon Gustafson 65' (pen.)	Stadium: Van Donge & De Roo Stadion; Attendance: 4,400

7 December 2018 15th week	PSV Eindhoven	6-0	Excelsior Rotterdam	Eindhoven
20:45	Luuk de Jong 17' 90+2'; Robin van der Meer 34' (o.g.); Jurgen Mattheij 52' (o.g.); Donyell Malen 80'; Steven Bergwijn 89'	Report		Stadium: Philips Stadion; Attendance: 33,100

15 December 2018 16th week	AZ Alkmaar	2-1	Excelsior Rotterdam	Alkmaar
19:45	Guus Til 39'; Bjorn Johnsen 90+4'	Report	Denis Mahmudov 30'	Stadium: AFAS Stadion; Attendance: 14,427

22 December 2018 17th week	Excelsior Rotterdam	0-3	Heracles Almelo	Rotterdam
20:45		Report	Kristoffer Peterson 35'; Brandley Kuwas 43'; Mohammed Osman 66'	Stadium: Van Donge & De Roo Stadion; Attendance: 4,032

==== 2nd half ====
18 January 2019 18th week	SBV Vitesse	3-2	Excelsior Rotterdam	Arnhem
20:00	Navarone Foor 6'; Bryan Linssen 36'; Maikel van der Werff 67'	Report	Marcus Edwards 51'; Jerdy Schouten 69'	Stadium: Gelredome; Attendance: 13,231

26 January 2019 19th week	Excelsior Rotterdam	2-0	De Graafschap	Rotterdam
19:45	Luigi Bruins 76'; Mounir El Hamdaoui 90+1'	Report		Stadium: Van Donge & De Roo Stadion; Attendance: 4,400

3 February 2019 20th week	Excelsior Rotterdam	2-1	Feyenoord	Rotterdam
12:15	Ali Messaoud 63'; Robin van der Meer 90'	Report	Robin van Persie 54'	Stadium: Van Donge & De Roo Stadion; Attendance: 4,400

10 February 2019 21st week	Fortuna Sittard	4-1	Excelsior Rotterdam	Sittard
12:15	Lazaros Lamprou 13' 33'; Mark Diemers 64'; Andrija Novakovich 90'	Report	Ali Messaoud 55'	Stadium: Fortuna Sittard Stadion; Attendance: 8,479

17 February 2019 22nd week	Excelsior Rotterdam	2-1	FC Emmen	Rotterdam
14:30	Marcus Edwards 62'; Dennis Eckert 65'	Report	Michael de Leeuw 59'	Stadium: Van Donge & De Roo Stadion; Attendance: 4,200

23 February 2019 23rd week	FC Utrecht	0-0	Excelsior Rotterdam	Utrecht
18:30		Report		Stadium: Stadion Galgenwaard; Attendance: 18,676

2 March 2019 24th week	Excelsior Rotterdam	0-2	PSV Eindhoven	Rotterdam
19:45		Report	Steven Bergwijn 8' 54'	Stadium: Van Donge & De Roo Stadion; Attendance: 4,400

9 March 2019 25th week	VVV-Venlo	1-0	Excelsior Rotterdam	Venlo
18:30	Johnatan Opoku 45+2'	Report		Stadium: De Koel; Attendance: 6,382

17 March 2019 26th week	Excelsior Rotterdam	0-2	PEC Zwolle	Rotterdam
16:45		Report	Kingsley Ehizibue 82'; Younes Namli 84'	Stadium: Van Donge & De Roo Stadion; Attendance: 4,093

30 March 2019 27th week	SC Heerenveen	1-0	Excelsior Rotterdam	Heerenveen
20:45	Pelle van Amersfoort 90+1'	Report		Stadium: Abe Lenstra Stadion; Attendance: 18,021

3 April 2019 28th week	Excelsior Rotterdam	1-2	NAC Breda	Rotterdam
19:45	Mounir El Hamdaoui 30'	Report	Giovanni Korte 67'; Menno Koch 90+3'	Stadium: Van Donge & De Roo Stadion; Attendance: 4,400

6 April 2019 29th week	FC Groningen	1-0	Excelsior Rotterdam	Groningen
19:45	Paul Gladon 70'	Report		Stadium: Euroborg; Attendance: 17,456

13 April 2019 30th week	AFC Ajax	6-2	Excelsior Rotterdam	Amsterdam
18:30	Klaas-Jan Huntelaar 10' 40' 65'; Dusan Tadic 37' 60' (pen.); Dusan Tadic 75'	Report	Mounir El Hamdaoui 42'; Jeffry Fortes 89'	Stadium: Johan Cruijff Arena; Attendance: 52,664

21 April 2019 31st week	Excelsior Rotterdam	1-1	Willem II Tilburg	Rotterdam
12:15	Mounir El Hamdaoui 90+3'	Report	Renato Tapia 16'	Stadium: Van Donge & De Roo Stadion; Attendance: 4,140

25 April 2019 32nd week	ADO Den Haag	3-1	Excelsior Rotterdam	The Hague
18:30	Abdenasser El Khayati 2'; Danny Bakker 29'; Sheraldo Becker 72'	Report	Jeffry Fortes 11'	Stadium: Bingoal Stadion; Attendance: 13,392

12 May 2019 33rd week	Heracles Almelo	4-5	Excelsior Rotterdam	Almelo
14:30	Adrián Dalmau 23' 51' 59'; Lerin Duarte 62'	Report	Elías Már Ómarsson 4' 45' 90+1'; Jurgen Mattheij 71'; Dennis Eckert 89'	Stadium: Asito Stadion; Attendance: 11,485

15 May 2019 34th week	Excelsior Rotterdam	4-2	AZ Alkmaar	Rotterdam
19:30	Jeffry Fortes 21'; Ricardo van Rhijn 51' (o.g.); Luigi Bruins 60' (pen.); Elías Már Ómarsson 66'	Report	Teun Koopmeiners 30'; Bjorn Johnsen 70'	Stadium: Van Donge & De Roo Stadion; Attendance: 3,811

==== Promotion/Relegation Play-offs ====
19 May 2019 2nd round 1st match	RKC Waalwijk	2-1	Excelsior Rotterdam	Waalwijk
14:30	Mario Bilate 53'; Juriën Gaari 81'	Report	Jeffry Fortes 71'	Stadium: Mandemakers Stadion; Attendance: 4,319

22 May 2019 2nd round 2nd match	Excelsior Rotterdam	1-1	RKC Waalwijk	Rotterdam
18:30	Elías Már Ómarsson 49'	Report	Stijn Spierings 38'	Stadium: Van Donge & De Roo Stadion; Attendance: 4,400

RKC Waalwijk won 3–2 on aggregate.

=== KNVB Cup ===
25 September 2018 1st round	NEC Nijmegen	2-3 (a.e.t.)	Excelsior Rotterdam	Rotterdam
20:45	Luigi Bruins 20' (pen.); Robin Buwalda 24' (o.g.)	Report	Anass Achahbar 34' (pen.); Sven Braken 80' (pen.); Guus Joppen 107'	Stadium: Van Donge & De Roo Stadion; Attendance: 1,902

== Statistics ==
=== Scorers ===
#	Player	Eredivisie	KNVB	Total
1	(Iceland) Elías Már Ómarsson	8	0	8
1	(Netherlands) Luigi Bruins	7	1	8
3	(Morocco) Ali Messaoud	7	0	7
4	(Cape Verde) Jeffry Fortes	5	0	5
5	(Morocco) Mounir El Hamdaoui	4	0	4
6	(North Macedonia) Denis Mahmudov	3	0	3
6	(Suriname) Ryan Koolwijk	3	0	3
8	(Germany) Dennis Eckert	2	0	2
8	(Netherlands) Jurgen Mattheij	2	0	2
8	(England) Marcus Edwards	2	0	2
11	(Netherlands) Jerdy Schouten	1	0	1
11	(Iceland) Mikkel Anderson	1	0	1
11	(Netherlands) Robin van der Meer	1	0	1

=== Appearances ===
#	Player	Eredivisie	KNVB	Total
1	(Cape Verde) Jeffry Fortes	34	1	35
1	(Netherlands) Jurgen Mattheij	34	1	35
3	(Netherlands) Jerdy Schouten	33	1	34
3	(Suriname) Ryan Koolwijk	33	1	34
5	(Netherlands) Luigi Bruins	31	1	32
6	(Morocco) Ali Messaoud	30	1	31
7	(Netherlands) Lorenzo Burnet	29	1	30
8	(England) Marcus Edwards	27	1	28
8	(Morocco) Mounir El Hamdaoui	27	1	28
10	(Netherlands) Alessandro Damen	25	1	26
10	(Iceland) Elías Már Ómarsson	25	1	26
12	(Belgium) Hervé Matthys	24	1	25
13	(Netherlands) Thomas Oude Kotte	23	0	23
14	(North Macedonia) Denis Mahmudov	19	1	20
15	(Iceland) Mikkel Anderson	18	0	18
15	(Netherlands) Robin van der Meer	17	1	18
17	(Turkey) Dogucan Haspolat	16	0	16
18	(Netherlands) Sonny Stevens	14	0	14
19	(Germany) Dennis Eckert	13	0	13
20	(Netherlands) Anouar Hadouir	11	1	12
21	(Belgium) Siebe Horemans	11	0	11
22	(Curaçao) Carlito Fermina	2	0	2
23	(Belgium) Jinty Caenepeel	1	0	1
23	(Morocco) Redouan El Hankouri	1	0	1

=== Clean sheets ===
#	Player	Eredivisie	Total
1	(Netherlands) Alessandro Damen	2	2
2	(Netherlands) Sonny Stevens	1	1
Total		3	3

=== Disciplinary record ===
#	Player	Eredivisie		KNVB		Total	
#	Player	Booked	Sent off (straight red)	Booked	Sent off (straight red)	Booked	Sent off (straight red)
1	(Netherlands) Jurgen Mattheij	8	1	0	0	8	1
2	(Netherlands) Luigi Bruins	4	1	0	0	4	1
3	(Morocco) Ali Messaoud	3	1	0	0	3	1
4	(England) Marcus Edwards	0	1	0	0	0	1
4	(Netherlands) Sonny Stevens	0	1	0	0	0	1
6	(Cape Verde) Jeffry Fortes	8	0	0	0	8	0
7	(Suriname) Ryan Koolwijk	6	0	0	0	6	0
8	(Belgium) Hervé Matthys	3	0	0	0	3	0
8	(Netherlands) Jerdy Schouten	3	0	0	0	3	0
10	(Netherlands) Stanley Elbers	2	0	0	0	2	0
10	(Netherlands) Lorenzo Burnet	2	0	0	0	2	0
10	(Morocco) Mounir El Hamdaoui	2	0	0	0	2	0
10	(Netherlands) Robin van der Meer	2	0	0	0	2	0
14	(Turkey) Dogucan Haspolat	1	0	0	0	1	0
14	(Iceland) Elías Már Ómarsson	1	0	0	0	1	0
14	(Iceland) Mikkel Anderson	1	0	0	0	1	0
14	(Netherlands) Thomas Oude Kotte	1	0	0	0	1	0
