= 2017–18 Excelsior Rotterdam season =

Dutch football club season

Excelsior Rotterdam
2017–18 season
- Stadium: Van Donge & De Roo Stadion
- Eredivisie: 11th
- KNVB Cup: 1st round
- Top goalscorer: League: Mike van Duinen (9 goals); All: Mike van Duinen (10 goals)
- Highest home attendance: 4,400 (9th, 13th, 28th, 30th, 34th weeks)
- Lowest home attendance: 1,902 (KNVB Cup 1st round)
- Average home league attendance: 4,035
- Biggest win: 3-1 (FC Twente (a) 10th week); 2-0 (AZ Alkmaar (a) 6th week) (FC Groningen (h) 17th week)
- Biggest defeat: 5-0 (Feyenoord (a) 29th week)
- All statistics correct as of 29 June 2025.

The 2017–18 season was Excelsior Rotterdam's 21st season in the Eredivisie (4th consecutive).

The club competed also in the KNVB Cup. Excelsior Rotterdam lost 2–1 against SC Heerenveen in the 1st round of KNVB Cup and eliminated from the cup.

Mike van Duinen was the top scorer of the club in this season with a 10 goals; 9 goals in the Eredivisie and 1 goal in the KNVB Cup.

Hicham Faik was the most appeared player in this season with 34 appearances; 33 appearances in the Eredivisie and 1 appearance in the KNVB Cup.

== Players ==
=== First-team squad ===
Source: Note: Flags indicate national team as defined under FIFA eligibility rules; some limited exceptions apply. Players may hold more than one non-FIFA nationality.

No.	Pos.	Nation	Player
1	GK	NED	Alessandro Damen
2	DF	NED	Khalid Karami
3	DF	USA	Shane O'Neill
4	DF	BEL	Wout Faes
5	DF	NED	Milan Massop
6	MF	NED	Hicham Faik
7	FW	NED	Anouar Hadouir
8	MF	SUR	Ryan Koolwijk
9	FW	NED	Mike van Duinen
10	MF	NED	Luigi Bruins
11	FW	NED	Stanley Elbers
12	GK	NED	Theo Zwarthoed
14	MF	MAR	Ali Messaoud

No.	Pos.	Nation	Player
15	DF	NED	Jurgen Mattheij
17	DF	USA	Desevio Payne
18	MF	NED	Kevin Vermeulen
19	FW	MAR	Zakaria El Azzouzi
20	FW	TRI	Levi García
21	MF	TUR	Dogucan Haspolat
21	DF	CPV	Jeffry Fortes
23	MF	BEL	Jinty Caenepeel
25	GK	ISL	Ögmundur Kristinsson
28	DF	NED	Lorenzo Burnet
30	DF	NED	Jordy de Wijs
33	FW	NED	Marouane Afaker

== Transfers ==
=== In ===
Pos.	Player	Transferred from	Fee	Date
DF	(Belgium) Wout Faes	(Belgium) R.S.C. Anderlecht	On loan	12 July 2017
DF	(Belgium) Jinty Caenepeel	(Netherlands) FC Eindhoven	€300,000	22 July 2017
DF	(United States) Shane O'Neill	(Cyprus) Apollon Limassol FC	Free	21 August 2017
DF	(Netherlands) Jordy de Wijs	(Netherlands) PSV Eindhoven	On loan	31 August 2017
GK	(Iceland) Ögmundur Kristinsson	(Sweden) Hammarby Fotboll		31 August 2017
GK	(Netherlands) Theo Zwarthoed	(Netherlands) ASV De Dijk	Free	31 August 2017
FW	(Trinidad and Tobago) Levi García	(Netherlands) AZ Alkmaar	On loan	18 January 2018

=== Out ===
Pos.	Player	Transferred to	Fee	Date
DF	(Brazil) Arghus	(Portugal) SC Braga	End of loan	30 June 2017
MF	(Serbia) Danilo Pantic	(England) Chelsea F.C.	End of loan	30 June 2017
GK	(Suriname) Warner Hahn	(Netherlands) Feyenoord	End of loan	30 June 2017
DF	(Cape Verde) Elso Brito	(Netherlands) SC Telstar	Free	1 July 2017
GK	(Poland) Filip Kurto	(Netherlands) Roda JC Kerkrade	Free	1 July 2017
FW	(Suriname) Nigel Hasselbaink	(Israel) Hapoel Ironi Kiryat Shmona F.C.	Free	1 July 2017
MF	(Angola) Fredy	(Portugal) C.F. Os Belenenses	Free	1 July 2017
DF	(Netherlands) Henrico Drost	(Netherlands) RKC Waalwijk	Free	5 July 2017
DF	(Netherlands) Bas Kuipers	(Netherlands) ADO Den Haag	Free	6 July 2017
FW	(Guyana) Terell Ondaan	(Netherlands) PEC Zwolle	Free	30 August 2017

== Competitions ==
=== Overall record ===
Competition	First match	Last match	Starting round	Final position	Record							
Competition	First match	Last match	Starting round	Final position	Pld	W	D	L	GF	GA	GD	Win %
Eredivisie	13 August 2017	6 May 2018	Week 1	11th	34	11	7	16	41	56	−15	32.35
KNVB Cup	20 September 2017	20 September 2017	1st round	1st round	1	0	0	1	1	2	−1	0.00
Total					35	11	7	17	42	58	−16	31.43

Source: Excelsior Rotterdam (ESPN)

=== Eredivisie ===
==== League table ====
Pos	Team	Pld	W	D	L	GF	GA	GD	Pts
9	PEC Zwolle	34	12	8	14	42	54	−12	44
10	Heracles Almelo	34	11	9	14	50	64	−14	42
11	Excelsior	34	11	7	16	41	56	−15	40
12	Groningen	34	8	14	12	50	50	0	38
13	Willem II	34	10	7	17	50	63	−13	37

Source: eredivisie.nl
Rules for classification: 1) Points; 2) Goal difference; 3) Goals scored; 4) Head-to-head points; 5) Head-to-head goal difference; 6) Head-to-head away goals scored; 7) Play-off if relevant for deciding champion, relegation or participating in a European league, otherwise by draw. 8) Penalty shoot-out (only after a play-off)

==== Results summary ====
Overall								Home						Away					
Pld	W	D	L	GF	GA	GD	Pts	W	D	L	GF	GA	GD	W	D	L	GF	GA	GD
34	11	7	16	41	57	−16	40	3	5	9	17	24	−7	8	2	7	24	33	−9

Source: https://www.espn.nl/voetbal/stand/_/competitie/NED.1/season/2016

==== Results by round ====
Round	1	2	3	4	5	6	7	8	9	10	11	12	13	14	15	16	17	18	19	20	21	22	23	24	25	26	27	28	29	30	31	32	33	34
Ground	A	H	A	H	H	A	H	A	H	A	H	A	H	A	H	A	H	H	A	A	H	A	H	A	A	H	A	H	A	H	A	H	A	H
Result	W	L	D	L	L	W	L	W	D	W	W	L	L	L	L	L	W	D	W	L	D	L	D	W	W	L	W	L	L	W	D	D	L	L
Position																																		11

Source: Eredivisie
A = Away; H = Home; W = Win; D = Draw; L = Loss

=== Matches ===
==== 1st half ====
13 August 2017 1st week	Willem II Tilburg	1-2	Excelsior Rotterdam	Tilburg
14:30	Fran Sol 65'	Report	Timon Wellenreuther 29' (o.g.); Zakaria El Azzouzi 52'	Stadium: Koning Willem II Stadion; Attendance: 12,800

20 August 2017 2nd week	Excelsior Rotterdam	0-1	Feyenoord	Rotterdam
12:30		Report	Jean-Paul Boëtius 18'	Stadium: Van Donge & De Roo Stadion; Attendance: 4,400

26 August 2017 3rd week	Heracles Almelo	2-2	Excelsior Rotterdam	Almelo
20:45	Brandley Kuwas 15'; Paul Gladon 52'	Report	Luigi Bruins 16'; Jinty Caenepeel 63'	Stadium: Asito Stadion; Attendance: 10,067

9 September 2017 4th week	Excelsior Rotterdam	0-3	SBV Vitesse	Rotterdam
20:45		Report	Luc Castaignos 45'; Tim Matavz 53' (pen.); Bryan Linssen 74'	Stadium: Van Donge & De Roo Stadion; Attendance: 4,100

16 September 2017 5th week	Excelsior Rotterdam	1-2	SC Heerenveen	Rotterdam
18:30	Ryan Koolwijk 18'	Report	Arbër Zeneli 50'; Marco Rojas 70'	Stadium: Van Donge & De Roo Stadion; Attendance: 4,034

24 September 2017 6th week	AZ Alkmaar	0-2	Excelsior Rotterdam	Alkmaar
16:45		Report	Luigi Bruins 2' (pen.) 8' (pen.)	Stadium: AFAS Stadion; Attendance: 12,527

30 September 2017 7th week	Excelsior Rotterdam	0-2	VVV-Venlo	Rotterdam
20:45		Report	Clint Leemans 32'; Ralf Seuntjens 70'	Stadium: Van Donge & De Roo Stadion; Attendance: 3,704

15 October 2017 8th week	ADO Den Haag	1-2	Excelsior Rotterdam	The Hague
16:45	Sheraldo Becker 32'	Report	Jinty Caenepeel 7'; Hicham Faik 81'	Stadium: Bingoal Stadion; Attendance: 10,805

21 October 2017 9th week	Excelsior Rotterdam	1-1	Sparta Rotterdam	Rotterdam
19:45	Milan Massop 54'	Report	Craig Goodwin 86'	Stadium: Van Donge & De Roo Stadion; Attendance: 4,400

27 October 2017 10th week	FC Twente	1-3	Excelsior Rotterdam	Enschede
20:00	Tom Boere 2'	Report	Hicham Faik 41'; Milan Massop 74'; Khalid Karami 80'	Stadium: De Grolsch Veste; Attendance: 23,200

4 November 2017 11th week	Excelsior Rotterdam	1-0	Roda JC Kerkrade	Rotterdam
19:45	Luigi Bruins 42'	Report		Stadium: Van Donge & De Roo Stadion; Attendance: 4,086

19 November 2017 12th week	FC Utrecht	3-1	Excelsior Rotterdam	Utrecht
14:30	Cyriel Dessers 8'; Yassine Ayoub 56'; Willem Janssen 64'	Report	Zakaria El Azzouzi 88'	Stadium: Stadion Galgenwaard; Attendance: 18,336

26 November 2017 13th week	Excelsior Rotterdam	1-2	PSV Eindhoven	Rotterdam
14:30	Ryan Koolwijk 52'	Report	Jurgen Mattheij 13' (o.g.); Hirving Lozano 41'	Stadium: Van Donge & De Roo Stadion; Attendance: 4,400

3 December 2017 14th week	NAC Breda	3-1	Excelsior Rotterdam	Breda
16:45	Thierry Ambrose 24' (pen.) 48' (pen.); Paolo Fernandes 77'	Report	Mike van Duinen 66'	Stadium: Rat Verlegh Stadion; Attendance: 18,340

9 December 2017 15th week	Excelsior Rotterdam	1-2	PEC Zwolle	Rotterdam
19:45	Mike van Duinen 48'	Report	Mustafa Saymak 49'; Younes Namli 65'	Stadium: Van Donge & De Roo Stadion; Attendance: 4,069

14 December 2017 16th week	AFC Ajax	3-1	Excelsior Rotterdam	Amsterdam
20:45	Siem de Jong 23'; Kasper Dolberg 57' (pen.); Hakim Ziyech 86'	Report	Mike van Duinen 40'	Stadium: Johan Cruijff Arena; Attendance: 51,695

17 December 2017 17th week	Excelsior Rotterdam	2-0	FC Groningen	Rotterdam
16:45	Milan Massop 8'; Stanley Elbers 83'	Report		Stadium: Van Donge & De Roo Stadion; Attendance: 3,808

23 December 2017 18th week	Excelsior Rotterdam	0-0	FC Twente	Rotterdam
20:45		Report		Stadium: Van Donge & De Roo Stadion; Attendance: 4,369

==== 2nd half ====
21 January 2018 19th week	Sparta Rotterdam	2-3	Excelsior Rotterdam	Rotterdam
12:30	Milan Massop 3' (o.g.); Loris Brogno 42' (pen.)	Report	Ali Messaoud 5' 45'; Anouar Hadouir 86'	Stadium: Sparta-Stadion Het Kasteel; Attendance: 10,224

28 January 2018 20th week	Roda JC Kerkrade	2-1	Excelsior Rotterdam	Kerkrade
14:30	Jorn Vancamp 45'; Dani Schahin 51'	Report	Milan Massop 16'	Stadium: Parkstad Limburg Stadion; Attendance: 11,226

4 February 2018 21st week	Excelsior Rotterdam	2-2	FC Utrecht	Rotterdam
12:30	Stanley Elbers 22'; Hicham Faik 77'	Report	Mark van der Maarel 25'; Zakaria Labyad 73'	Stadium: Van Donge & De Roo Stadion; Attendance: 3,997

7 February 2018 22nd week	PSV Eindhoven	1-0	Excelsior Rotterdam	Eindhoven
18:30	Hirving Lozano 17'	Report		Stadium: Philips Stadion; Attendance: 32,100

11 February 2018 23rd week	Excelsior Rotterdam	0-0	NAC Breda	Rotterdam
14:30		Report		Stadium: Van Donge & De Roo Stadion; Attendance: 3,876

17 February 2018 24th week	SBV Vitesse	1-2	Excelsior Rotterdam	Arnhem
18:30	Luc Castaignos 2'	Report	Hicham Faik 44'; Mike van Duinen 66'	Stadium: Gelredome; Attendance: 15,432

24 February 2018 25th week	SC Heerenveen	0-1	Excelsior Rotterdam	Heerenveen
19:45		Report	Mike van Duinen 35'	Stadium: Abe Lenstra Stadion; Attendance: 18,920

3 March 2018 26th week	Excelsior Rotterdam	1-2	AZ Alkmaar	Rotterdam
18:30	Ali Messaoud 64'	Report	Theo Zwarthoed 19' (o.g.); Alireza Jahanbakhsh 44'	Stadium: Van Donge & De Roo Stadion; Attendance: 4,218

10 March 2018 27th week	VVV-Venlo	2-3	Excelsior Rotterdam	Venlo
19:45	Jurgen Mattheij 41' (o.g.); Lennart Thy 84'	Report	Levi García 35'; Hicham Faik 61'; Mike van Duinen 81'	Stadium: Kooi Stadion; Attendance: 6,021

16 March 2018 28th week	Excelsior Rotterdam	1-2	ADO Den Haag	Rotterdam
20:00	Milan Massop 26'	Report	Bjorn Johnsen 52' 79'	Stadium: Van Donge & De Roo Stadion; Attendance: 4,400

1 April 2018 29th week	Feyenoord	5-0	Excelsior Rotterdam	Rotterdam
16:45	Jean-Paul Boëtius 4'; Jens Toornstra 27'; Tonny Vilhena 42'; Steven Berghuis 55'; Jordy de Wijs 76' (o.g.)	Report		Stadium: De Kuip; Attendance: 45,000

6 April 2018 30th week	Excelsior Rotterdam	2-1	Willem II Tilburg	Rotterdam
20:00	Luigi Bruins 28' (pen.); Stanley Elbers 45+1'	Report	Fran Sol 14'	Stadium: Van Donge & De Roo Stadion; Attendance: 4,400

14 April 2018 31st week	PEC Zwolle	1-1	Excelsior Rotterdam	Zwolle
20:45	Youness Mokhtar 17'	Report	Mike van Duinen 57' (pen.)	Stadium: MAC³PARK Stadion; Attendance: 13,028

18 April 2018 32nd week	Excelsior Rotterdam	2-2	Heracles Almelo	Rotterdam
19:45	Ali Messaoud 7'; Mike van Duinen 51' (pen.)	Report	Jamiro Monteiro 90+2' 90+4' (pen.)	Stadium: Van Donge & De Roo Stadion; Attendance: 4,065

29 April 2018 33rd week	FC Groningen	4-0	Excelsior Rotterdam	Groningen
14:30	Tom van Weert 42' 73'; Samir Memišević 45+1'; Ritsu Doan 71'	Report		Stadium: Euroborg; Attendance: 18,847

6 May 2018 34th week	Excelsior Rotterdam	1-2	AFC Ajax	Rotterdam
14:30	Matthijs de Ligt 20' (o.g.)	Report	Justin Kluivert 48'; Kasper Dolberg 53' (pen.)	Stadium: Van Donge & De Roo Stadion; Attendance: 4,400

=== KNVB Cup ===
20 September 2017 1st round	SC Heerenveen	2-1	Excelsior Rotterdam	Rotterdam
19:45	Mike van Duinen 74' (pen.)	Report	Arbër Zeneli 9' 15'	Stadium: Van Donge & De Roo Stadion; Attendance: 1,902; Referee: Dennis Higler

== Statistics ==
=== Scorers ===
#	Player	Eredivisie	KNVB	Total
1	(Netherlands) Mike van Duinen	9	1	10
2	(Netherlands) Hicham Faik	5	0	5
2	(Netherlands) Luigi Bruins	5	0	5
4	(Morocco) Ali Messaoud	4	0	4
4	(Netherlands) Milan Massop	4	0	4
6	(Netherlands) Stanley Elbers	3	0	3
7	(Belgium) Jinty Caenepeel	2	0	2
7	(Suriname) Ryan Koolwijk	2	0	2
7	(Morocco) Zakaria El Azzouzi	2	0	2
10	(Netherlands) Anouar Hadouir	1	0	1
10	(Netherlands) Khalid Karami	1	0	1
10	(Trinidad and Tobago) Levi García	1	0	1

=== Appearances ===
#	Player	Eredivisie	KNVB	Total
1	(Netherlands) Hicham Faik	33	1	34
2	(Morocco) Ali Messaoud	31	1	32
2	(Netherlands) Jurgen Mattheij	32	0	32
4	(Netherlands) Mike van Duinen	29	1	30
5	(Suriname) Ryan Koolwijk	28	1	29
6	(Cape Verde) Jeffry Fortes	28	0	28
6	(Netherlands) Khalid Karami	27	1	28
6	(Netherlands) Luigi Bruins	27	1	28
9	(Netherlands) Milan Massop	26	1	27
10	(Netherlands) Kevin Vermeulen	25	1	26
11	(Netherlands) Stanley Elbers	24	0	24
12	(Netherlands) Anouar Hadouir	23	0	23
13	(Netherlands) Jordy de Wijs	19	1	20
13	(Belgium) Wout Faes	19	1	20
15	(Morocco) Zakaria El Azzouzi	17	1	18
16	(Belgium) Jinty Caenepeel	17	0	17
17	(Iceland) Ögmundur Kristinsson	15	1	16
17	(Netherlands) Theo Zwarthoed	16	0	16
19	(Trinidad and Tobago) Levi García	15	0	15
20	(Turkey) Dogucan Haspolat	7	0	7
21	(United States) Desevio Payne	4	1	5
22	(Netherlands) Lorenzo Burnet	4	0	4
23	(Netherlands) Alessandro Damen	3	0	3
24	(United States) Shane O'Neill	1	1	2
25	(Netherlands) Marouane Afaker	1	0	1

=== Clean sheets ===
#	Player	Eredivisie	Total
1	(Netherlands) Theo Zwarthoed	4	4
2	(Iceland) Ögmundur Kristinsson	2	2
Total		6	6

=== Disciplinary record ===
#	Player	Eredivisie		KNVB		Total	
#	Player	Booked	Sent off (straight red)	Booked	Sent off (straight red)	Booked	Sent off (straight red)
1	(Netherlands) Luigi Bruins	4	1	0	0	4	1
2	(Netherlands) Stanley Elbers	2	1	0	0	2	1
3	(Netherlands) Anouar Hadouir	1	1	0	0	1	1
4	(Suriname) Ryan Koolwijk	8	0	1	0	9	0
5	(Cape Verde) Jeffry Fortes	7	0	0	0	7	0
5	(Netherlands) Jurgen Mattheij	7	0	0	0	7	0
5	(Netherlands) Mike van Duinen	6	0	1	0	7	0
8	(Morocco) Ali Messaoud	5	0	0	0	5	0
8	(Netherlands) Jordy de Wijs	5	0	0	0	5	0
10	(Netherlands) Milan Massop	4	0	0	0	4	0
11	(Netherlands) Hicham Faik	3	0	0	0	3	0
11	(Netherlands) Kevin Vermeulen	3	0	0	0	3	0
11	(Belgium) Wout Faes	3	0	0	0	3	0
14	(Netherlands) Khalid Karami	1	0	1	0	2	0
15	(Turkey) Dogucan Haspolat	1	0	0	0	1	0
15	(Belgium) Jinty Caenepeel	1	0	0	0	1	0
