= List of Dutch football transfers summer 2018 =

This is a list of Dutch football transfers for the 2018 summer transfer window. Only transfers featuring Eredivisie are listed.

== Eredivisie ==
Note: Flags indicate national team as has been defined under FIFA eligibility rules. Players may hold more than one non-FIFA nationality.

=== ADO Den Haag ===
In:

No.	Pos.	Nation	Player
18	GK	NED	Mike Havekotte (from Excelsior)
97	FW	CHN	Zhang Yuning (on loan from (England) West Bromwich Albion, previously on loan at (Germany) Werder Bremen)

Out:

No.	Pos.	Nation	Player
2	DF	NGR	Tyronne Ebuehi (to (Portugal) Benfica)
11	FW	NED	Ricardo Kishna (loan return to (Italy) Lazio)
18	GK	NED	Tim Coremans (to Sparta Rotterdam)
21	FW	FRA	Édouard Duplan (released)
—	DF	GER	Thomas Meißner (to Willem II, previously on loan)

=== Ajax ===
In:

No.	Pos.	Nation	Player
18	FW	BFA	Hassane Bandé (from (Belgium) Mechelen)
19	MF	MAR	Zakaria Labyad (from Utrecht)
11	MF	SRB	Dušan Tadić (from (England) Southampton)
17	DF	NED	Daley Blind (from (England) Manchester United)

Out:

No.	Pos.	Nation	Player
11	FW	GER	Amin Younes (to (Italy) Napoli)
19	FW	COL	Mateo Cassierra (on loan to Groningen)
26	DF	NED	Nick Viergever (to PSV)
35	DF	NED	Mitchell Dijks (to (Italy) Bologna)
45	FW	NED	Justin Kluivert (to (Italy) Roma)
—	DF	NED	Deyovaisio Zeefuik (to Groningen, previously on loan)

=== AZ Alkmaar ===
In:

No.	Pos.	Nation	Player
3	DF	GER	Henri Weigelt (from (Germany) Arminia Bielefeld)
16	GK	NED	Rody de Boer (from Telstar)
18	MF	NED	Marko Vejinović (from Feyenoord, previously on loan)
23	DF	NED	Léon Bergsma (from Jong Ajax)

Out:

No.	Pos.	Nation	Player
8	MF	NED	Joris van Overeem (to Utrecht)
9	FW	NED	Wout Weghorst (to (Germany) VfL Wolfsburg)
16	GK	NED	Gino Coutinho (to NEC)
23	DF	NED	Ricardo van Rhijn (loan return to (Belgium) Club Brugge)
25	GK	NED	Nick Olij (on loan to TOP Oss)

=== De Graafschap ===
In:

No.	Pos.	Nation	Player
1	GK	NED	Hidde Jurjus (on loan from PSV, previously on loan at Roda JC)
4	DF	NED	Ted van de Pavert (from PEC Zwolle, previously on loan at NEC)
7	FW	NED	Furdjel Narsingh (from Cambuur)
8	MF	NED	Javier Vet (from Almere City)
10	FW	NED	Stef Nijland (from PEC Zwolle)
11	FW	NED	Daryl van Mieghem (from Heracles Almelo, previously on loan)
17	MF	NED	Liban Abdulahi (from Telstar)
19	FW	NED	Jordy Thomassen (from Helmond Sport)
47	FW	NED	Mo Hamdaoui (from Telstar)

Out:

No.	Pos.	Nation	Player
3	DF	NED	Kevin van Diermen (to IJsselmeervogels)
8	MF	NED	Tim Receveur (to Almere City)
10	MF	NED	Mark Diemers (to Fortuna Sittard)
13	FW	NED	Sjoerd Ars (loan return to Fortuna Sittard)
17	FW	MAR	Tarik Tissoudali (loan return to (France) Le Havre)

=== Emmen ===
In:

No.	Pos.	Nation	Player
7	FW	NED	Luciano Slagveer (on loan from (Belgium) Lokeren, previously on loan at Twente)
9	FW	NED	Jafar Arias (from Dordrecht)
14	MF	BEL	Jason Bourdouxhe (from Helmond Sport)
16	DF	NED	Caner Cavlan (from Heerenveen, previously on loan at (Turkey) Boluspor)
17	MF	NED	Wouter Marinus (from PEC Zwolle)

Out:

No.	Pos.	Nation	Player
4	DF	NED	Jeroen Veldmate (to Go Ahead Eagles)
7	FW	AFG	Omran Haydary (to Dordrecht)
12	DF	NED	Joris Voest (to Harkemase Boys)
25	MF	NED	Willem Huizing (to Harkemase Boys)
27	MF	NED	Youri Loen (to Almere City)
—	DF	NED	Nande Wielink (to ACV Assen, previously on loan at (Germany) Spelle-Venhaus)

=== Excelsior ===
In:

No.	Pos.	Nation	Player
4	DF	NED	Thomas Oude Kotte (from Vitesse)
5	DF	NED	Robin van der Meer (from Utrecht)
6	MF	NED	Jerdy Schouten (from Telstar)
19	FW	ISL	Mikael Anderson (on loan from (Denmark) Midtjylland, previously on loan at (Denmark) Vendsyssel)
20	GK	NED	Sonny Stevens (from Go Ahead Eagles)
23	GK	NED	Maarten de Fockert (from Heerenveen, previously on loan at Go Ahead Eagles)
24	FW	MKD	Denis Mahmudov (from Dordrecht)
—	DF	BEL	Hervé Matthys (from Eindhoven)

Out:

No.	Pos.	Nation	Player
2	DF	NED	Khalid Karami (to Vitesse)
3	DF	USA	Shane O'Neill (to (United States) Orlando City)
4	DF	BEL	Wout Faes (loan return to (Belgium) Anderlecht)
5	DF	NED	Milan Massop (to (Belgium) Waasland-Beveren)
6	MF	NED	Hicham Faik (to (Belgium) Zulte Waregem)
9	FW	NED	Mike van Duinen (to PEC Zwolle)
16	GK	NED	Mike Havekotte (to ADO Den Haag)
18	MF	NED	Kevin Vermeulen (to Waalwijk)
19	FW	NED	Zakaria El Azzouzi (loan return to Jong Ajax)
20	FW	TTO	Levi García (loan return to AZ)
30	DF	NED	Jordy de Wijs (loan return to PSV)

=== Feyenoord ===
In:

No.	Pos.	Nation	Player
17	FW	COL	Luis Sinisterra (from (Colombia) Once Caldas)
18	MF	MAR	Yassin Ayoub (from Utrecht)

Out:

No.	Pos.	Nation	Player
8	FW	MAR	Karim El Ahmadi (to (Saudi Arabia) Al-Ittihad)
14	FW	TUR	Bilal Başaçıkoğlu (to (Turkey) Kayserispor)
17	DF	NED	Kevin Diks (loan return to (Italy) Fiorentina)
—	MF	NED	Marko Vejinović (to AZ, previously on loan)
—	MF	NED	Gustavo Hamer (to PEC Zwolle, previously on loan at Dordrecht)
—	MF	SWE	Simon Gustafson (to Utrecht, previously on loan at Roda JC)

=== Fortuna Sittard ===
In:

No.	Pos.	Nation	Player
8	MF	NED	Mark Diemers (from De Graafschap)
17	DF	BEL	Alessandro Ciranni (from MVV)
19	FW	USA	Andrija Novakovich (on loan from (England) Reading, previously on loan at Telstar)
22	MF	MAR	Ahmed El Messaoudi (on loan from (Belgium) Mechelen)
—	GK	MDA	Alexei Koșelev (from (Romania) Politehnica Iași)
—	DF	VEN	Rubén Ramírez (on loan from Atlético Venezuela)
—	MF	AUS	George Mells (free agent)
—	FW	HUN	Áron Dobos (from (Hungary) Dunaújváros)

Out:

No.	Pos.	Nation	Player
3	DF	NED	Perr Schuurs (loan return to Ajax)
17	MF	NED	Dries Saddiki (to Willem II)
22	FW	NED	Mohamed Kourouma (to Groene Ster)
—	FW	NED	Sjoerd Ars (to De Treffers, previously on loan at De Graafschap)

=== Groningen ===
In:

No.	Pos.	Nation	Player
7	MF	JPN	Ritsu Doan (from (Japan) Gamba Osaka, previously on loan)
9	FW	COL	Mateo Cassierra (on loan from Ajax)
18	FW	NED	Ahmad Mendes Moreira (from Kozakken Boys)
24	DF	GER	Jeff Chabot (from Sparta Rotterdam)
42	DF	NED	Deyovaisio Zeefuik (from Ajax, previously on loan)

Out:

No.	Pos.	Nation	Player
7	MF	NED	Juninho Bacuna (to (England) Huddersfield Town)
9	FW	NED	Lars Veldwijk (to Sparta Rotterdam)
20	MF	NED	Yoell van Nieff (to Heracles Almelo)

=== Heerenveen ===
In:

No.	Pos.	Nation	Player
2	DF	NED	Sherel Floranus (from Sparta Rotterdam)
9	FW	NED	Sam Lammers (on loan from PSV)

Out:

No.	Pos.	Nation	Player
2	DF	NED	Denzel Dumfries (to PSV)
10	FW	NOR	Martin Ødegaard (loan return to (Spain) Real Madrid)
24	GK	DEN	Martin Hansen (loan return to (Germany) FC Ingolstadt 04)
—	GK	NED	Maarten de Fockert (to Excelsior, previously on loan at Go Ahead Eagles)
—	DF	NED	Caner Cavlan (to Emmen, previously on loan at (Turkey) Boluspor)
—	DF	NED	Robert van Koesveld (to Cambuur, previously on loan at Helmond Sport)

=== Heracles Almelo ===
In:

No.	Pos.	Nation	Player
1	GK	GER	Janis Blaswich (from (Germany) Borussia Mönchengladbach, previously on loan at (Germany) Hansa Rostock)
9	FW	ESP	Adrián Dalmau (from (Spain) Villarreal B)
10	MF	NED	Yoell van Nieff (from Groningen)
11	FW	NED	Silvester van der Water (from Almere City)
20	DF	NED	Jelle van Benthem (from Jong Twente)
22	FW	NED	Zeki Erkilinc (from Twente, previously on loan)
23	DF	GER	Maximilian Rossmann (from (Germany) Sportfreunde Lotte)
25	FW	NED	Joey Konings (from Jong PSV)

Out:

No.	Pos.	Nation	Player
1	GK	BEL	Bram Castro (to (Belgium) Mechelen)
3	DF	BEL	Dries Wuytens (to Sparta Rotterdam)
9	FW	NED	Paul Gladon (loan return to (England) Wolverhampton Wanderers)
15	FW	CZE	Jaroslav Navrátil (to Go Ahead Eagles)
22	DF	NED	Roland Baas (to Go Ahead Eagles)
—	FW	NED	Daryl van Mieghem (to De Graafschap, previously on loan)

=== NAC Breda ===
In:

No.	Pos.	Nation	Player
—	DF	NED	Pele van Anholt (free agent)
—	FW	NED	Gervane Kastaneer (from (Germany) 1. FC Kaiserslautern)
—	FW	NED	Mikhail Rosheuvel (from Roda JC)
—	DF	ENG	Greg Leigh (from (England) Bury)
—	DF	CUW	Jurich Carolina (from Jong PSV)
—	DF	USA	Erik Palmer-Brown (on loan from (England) Manchester City, previously on loan at (Belgium) Kortrijk)

Out:

No.	Pos.	Nation	Player
9	FW	FRA	Thierry Ambrose (loan return to (England) Manchester City)
17	MF	NED	Bodi Brusselers (on loan to Helmond Sport)
18	DF	NED	Bart Meijers (on loan to Helmond Sport)
19	MF	ESP	Manu García (loan return to (England) Manchester City)
20	FW	GHA	Thomas Agyepong (loan return to (England) Manchester City)
22	DF	ESP	Pablo Marí (loan return to (England) Manchester City)
23	GK	NED	Nigel Bertrams (to (Denmark) Nordsjælland)
28	FW	NED	Diego Snepvangers (on loan to Helmond Sport)
31	MF	NED	Feyo Glim (to Koninklijke)
35	DF	ENG	James Horsfield (to (England) Scunthorpe United)
45	FW	HAI	Richelor Sprangers (on loan to Helmond Sport)
69	DF	ESP	Angeliño (loan return to (England) Manchester City)
97	FW	NGR	Umar Sadiq (loan return to (Italy) Roma)
—	GK	NED	Sven van der Maaten (to Telstar, previously on loan)

=== PEC Zwolle ===
In:

No.	Pos.	Nation	Player
—	MF	NED	Zian Flemming (from Jong Ajax)
—	MF	NED	Gustavo Hamer (from Feyenoord, previously on loan at Dordrecht)
—	DF	CUW	Darryl Lachman (from Willem II)
—	DF	NED	Kenneth Paal (on loan from PSV)
—	MF	AUS	Denis Genreau (on loan from (Australia) Melbourne City)
—	FW	NED	Mike van Duinen (from Excelsior)
—	FW	NED	Vito van Crooy (from VVV)
—	MF	NED	Clint Leemans (from VVV)

Out:

No.	Pos.	Nation	Player
3	DF	ARG	Nicolás Freire (loan return to (Uruguay) Torque)
6	MF	NED	Mustafa Saymak (to (Turkey) Rizespor)
7	FW	MAR	Youness Mokhtar (to (Turkey) Ankaragücü)
8	MF	NED	Wouter Marinus (to Emmen)
9	FW	POL	Piotr Parzyszek (to (Poland) Piast Gliwice)
10	FW	NED	Stef Nijland (to De Graafschap)
13	DF	NED	Philippe Sandler (to (England) Manchester City)
17	FW	NED	Queensy Menig (loan return to (France) Nantes)
33	FW	GRE	Thanasis Karagounis (to (Greece) Lamia)
—	DF	NED	Ted van de Pavert (to De Graafschap, previously on loan at NEC)
—	DF	CZE	Josef Kvída (to NEC, previously on loan at Almere City)

=== PSV ===
In:

No.	Pos.	Nation	Player
4	DF	NED	Nick Viergever (from Ajax)
6	DF	ESP	Angeliño (from (England) Manchester City, previously on loan at NAC Breda)
10	FW	ARG	Maximiliano Romero (from (Argentina) Vélez Sarsfield, previously on loan)
22	DF	NED	Denzel Dumfries (from Heerenveen)
—	GK	GER	Lars Unnerstall (from VVV)

Out:

No.	Pos.	Nation	Player
10	MF	NED	Marco van Ginkel (loan return to (England) Chelsea)
14	FW	NED	Sam Lammers (on loan to Heerenveen)
20	DF	NED	Joshua Brenet (to (Germany) 1899 Hoffenheim)
21	GK	NED	Luuk Koopmans (on loan to MVV)
32	DF	NED	Kenneth Paal (on loan to PEC Zwolle)
—	GK	GER	Lars Unnerstall (on loan to VVV)
—	DF	NED	Damian van Bruggen (to VVV, previously on loan)
—	DF	NED	Jordy de Wijs (to (England) Hull City, previously on loan at Excelsior)
—	GK	NED	Hidde Jurjus (on loan to De Graafschap, previously on loan at Roda JC)

=== Utrecht ===
In:

No.	Pos.	Nation	Player
5	DF	GER	Leon Guwara (from (Germany) Werder Bremen, previously on loan at (Germany) 1. FC Kaiserslautern)
8	MF	NED	Joris van Overeem (from AZ)
10	MF	SWE	Simon Gustafson (from Feyenoord, previously on loan at Roda JC)
26	MF	BEL	Othman Boussaid (from (Belgium) Lierse)

Out:

No.	Pos.	Nation	Player
5	DF	BIH	Dario Đumić (on loan to (Germany) Dynamo Dresden)
8	MF	MAR	Yassin Ayoub (to Feyenoord)
10	MF	MAR	Zakaria Labyad (to Ajax)
13	MF	POL	Mateusz Klich (loan return to (England) Leeds United)
15	DF	NED	Robin van der Meer (to Excelsior)
21	FW	FRA	Jean-Christophe Bahebeck (loan return to (France) Paris Saint-Germain)

=== Vitesse ===
In:

No.	Pos.	Nation	Player
1	GK	POR	Eduardo (on loan from (England) Chelsea)
2	DF	NED	Khalid Karami (from Excelsior)
5	DF	ENG	Max Clark (from (England) Hull City)
13	FW	ALG	Oussama Darfalou (from (Algeria) USM Alger)
14	DF	ENG	Jake Clarke-Salter (on loan from (England) Chelsea, previously on loan at (England) Sunderland)
19	FW	NGR	Hilary Gong (from (Slovakia) Trenčín)
21	MF	SVK	Matúš Bero (from (Turkey) Trabzonspor)
26	DF	DEN	Rasmus Thelander (from (Switzerland) Zürich)
30	DF	NED	Danilho Doekhi (from Jong Ajax)

Out:

No.	Pos.	Nation	Player
2	DF	ENG	Fankaty Dabo (loan return to (England) Chelsea)
5	DF	USA	Matt Miazga (loan return to (England) Chelsea)
14	FW	NED	Luc Castaignos (loan return to (Portugal) Sporting)
19	MF	ENG	Mason Mount (loan return to (England) Chelsea)
29	DF	NED	Julian Lelieveld (on loan to Go Ahead Eagles)
37	DF	GEO	Guram Kashia (to (United States) San Jose Earthquakes)
41	MF	NED	Julian Calor (to Cambuur)
50	DF	NED	Thomas Oude Kotte (to Excelsior)
51	DF	NED	Gino Bosz (to Go Ahead Eagles)

=== VVV-Venlo ===
In:

No.	Pos.	Nation	Player
1	GK	GER	Lars Unnerstall (on loan from PSV)
11	FW	NED	Jay-Roy Grot (on loan from (England) Leeds United)
14	DF	NED	Christian Kum (from Roda JC)
20	DF	NED	Damian van Bruggen (from PSV, previously on loan)
26	FW	TOG	Peniel Mlapa (on loan from (Germany) Dynamo Dresden)
31	MF	BIH	Tino-Sven Sušić (from (Belgium) Antwerp)

Out:

No.	Pos.	Nation	Player
1	GK	GER	Lars Unnerstall (to PSV)
7	FW	NED	Vito van Crooy (to PEC Zwolle)
8	MF	NED	Clint Leemans (to PEC Zwolle)
11	FW	GER	Lennart Thy (loan return to (Germany) Werder Bremen)
24	FW	NED	Lugman Bezzat (to (Belgium) Hasselt)
26	FW	DEN	Emil Riis Jakobsen (loan return to (England) Derby County)
27	DF	NED	Jeffrey Rijkers (to EVV)
29	MF	NED	Roy Gielen (to EVV)
30	GK	NED	Sem Custers (to Jong NAC Breda)

=== Willem II ===
In:

No.	Pos.	Nation	Player
8	MF	ESP	Pol Llonch (from (Poland) Wisła Kraków)
10	MF	GRE	Dimitris Kolovos (on loan from (Belgium) Mechelen)
12	GK	NZL	Michael Woud (from (England) Sunderland Reserves and Academy)
17	MF	NED	Dries Saddiki (from Fortuna Sittard)
22	MF	GER	Atakan Akkaynak (from (Germany) Bayer Leverkusen U19)
24	DF	NZL	James McGarry (from (New Zealand) Wellington Phoenix)
25	DF	GER	Thomas Meißner (from ADO Den Haag, previously on loan)

Out:

No.	Pos.	Nation	Player
5	DF	NED	Jop van der Linden (loan return to AZ)
6	MF	ESP	Pedro Chirivella (loan return to (England) Liverpool)
10	MF	NED	Thom Haye (to (Italy) Lecce)
15	DF	NED	Giliano Wijnaldum (to Sparta Rotterdam)
19	FW	NED	Mohamed El Hankouri (loan return to Feyenoord)
21	DF	GRE	Kostas Tsimikas (loan return to (Greece) Olympiacos)
23	MF	NED	Ben Rienstra (loan return to AZ)
29	DF	CUW	Darryl Lachman (to PEC Zwolle)
38	FW	BEL	Ismail Azzaoui (loan return to (Germany) VfL Wolfsburg)
