= 2016–17 FC Groningen season =

FC Groningen
2016–17 season
- Head coach: Ernest Faber
- Stadium: Euroborg
- Eredivisie: 8th
- KNVB Cup: 2nd round
- Top goalscorer: League: Mimoun Mahi (17 goals); All: Mimoun Mahi (17 goals)
- Highest home attendance: 22,312 (against AFC Ajax)
- Lowest home attendance: 17,818 (against ADO Den Haag)
- Average home league attendance: 19,700
- Biggest win: 5-1 against PEC Zwolle and 4-0 against PEC Zwolle in Eredivisie and 4-0 against VV Capelle in KNVB Cup
- Biggest defeat: 5-0 against Feyenoord in Eredivisie
Home colours

FC Groningen finished 8th in the 2016–17 Eredivisie season.

FC Groningen also competed in the KNVB Cup, where they lost 1–0 to FC Utrecht in the 2nd round and were eliminated from the cup.

Mimoun Mahi was the top scorer of the club for that season with 17 goals in Eredivisie.

Sergio Padt was the player with the most appearances of 38; 36 appearances in Eredivisie and 2 appearances in the KNVB Cup.

== Players ==
=== First-team squad ===
Note: Flags indicate national team as defined under FIFA eligibility rules; some limited exceptions apply. Players may hold more than one non-FIFA nationality.

No.	Pos.	Nation	Player
1	GK	NED	Sergio Padt
2	DF	AUS	Jason Davidson
3	DF	DEN	Kasper Larsen
5	DF	BIH	Samir Memišević
6	MF	NED	Etiënne Reijnen
7	FW	CUW	Jarchinio Antonia
8	MF	NOR	Ruben Jenssen
8	FW	NED	Danny Hoesen
10	MF	SVK	Albert Rusnák
11	FW	NED	Bryan Linssen
12	MF	CUW	Juninho Bacuna
13	FW	NOR	Alexander Sørloth
14	FW	MAR	Mimoun Mahi
16	GK	NED	Stefan van der Lei
17	MF	NED	Jesper Drost
19	FW	NED	Tom van Weert
20	MF	NED	Yoell van Nieff

No.	Pos.	Nation	Player
21	DF	NED	Martijn Van Der Laan
22	MF	SWE	Simon Tibbling
23	MF	NED	Hedwiges Maduro
24	DF	NED	Tom Hiariej
25	DF	USA	Desevio Payne
31	GK	NED	Erwin Heidekamp
32	GK	NED	Nick Borgman
33	DF	NED	Hans Hateboer
34	DF	NED	Roland Baas
35	DF	NED	Glenn Bijl
36	MF	AUS	Ajdin Hrustic
40	MF	NED	Keziah Veendorp
43	FW	NED	Robbert de Vos
45	FW	MAR	Oussama Idrissi
48	MF	PNG	David Browne
49	MF	NED	Gerald Postma
53	DF	NED	Tim Riksman

== Transfers ==
=== In ===
Pos.	Player	Transferred from	Fee	Date
DF	(Netherlands) Martijn Van Der Laan	(Netherlands) SC Cambuur	End of loan	30 Jun 2016
MF	(Netherlands) Yoell van Nieff	(Netherlands) Excelsior Rotterdam	End of loan	30 Jun 2016
MF	(Norway) Ruben Jenssen	(Germany) 1. FC Kaiserslautern	Free	1 Jul 2016
FW	(Netherlands) Tom van Weert	(Netherlands) Excelsior Rotterdam	Free	1 Jul 2016
DF	(Bosnia and Herzegovina) Samir Memišević	(Bosnia and Herzegovina) FK Radnik Bijeljina		1 Aug 2016
FW	(Netherlands) Jason Davidson	(England) Huddersfield Town A.F.C.	On loan	18 Aug 2016
DF	(Netherlands) Tom Hiariej	(Netherlands) SC Cambuur	End of loan	30 Jun 2016

=== Out ===
Pos.	Player	Transferred to	Fee	Date
FW	(Montenegro) Dino Islamović			1 Jul 2016
DF	(Netherlands) Lorenzo Burnet	(Slovakia) ŠK Slovan Bratislava	Free	1 Jul 2016
FW	(Netherlands) Michael de Leeuw	(United States) Chicago Fire FC	Free	1 Jul 2016
DF	(Sweden) Rasmus Lindgren	(Sweden) BK Häcken	Free	1 Jul 2016
MF	(Netherlands) Abel Tamata			31 Aug 2016
FW	(Curaçao) Jarchinio Antonia			31 Aug 2016
MF	(Netherlands) Hans Hateboer	(Italy) Atalanta BC	€1,040,000	31 Jan 2017
MF	(Slovakia) Albert Rusnák	(United States) Real Salt Lake	€435,000	6 Jan 2017
FW	(Netherlands) Danny Hoesen	(United States) San Jose Earthquakes	On loan	2 Feb 2017

== Pre-season and friendlies ==
Win Draw Loss

4 July 2016 Friendly	Djurgårdens IF Fotboll	0-1	FC Groningen	Stockholm
19:00		Report	Tom van Weert	Stadium: Tele2 Arena

11 July 2016 Friendly	FC Groningen	3-1	Queens Park Rangers F.C.	Groningen
20:00	Juninho Bacuna 13'; Cole Kpekawa 64' (o.g.); Danny Hoesen 75' (pen.)	Report	Jay Emmanuel-Thomas 66'	Stadium: Euroborg; Attendance: 4,000

== Competitions ==
=== Overall record ===
Competition	First match	Last match	Starting round	Final position	Record							
Competition	First match	Last match	Starting round	Final position	Pld	W	D	L	GF	GA	GD	Win %
Eredivisie	7 August 2016	22 April 2017	Week 1	8th	34	10	13	11	55	51	+4	29.41
KNVB	20 September 2016	26 October 2016	1st round	2nd round	2	1	0	1	4	1	+3	50.00
Total					36	11	13	12	59	52	+7	30.56

Source: Competitions

=== Eredivisie ===
==== Results summary ====
Overall								Home						Away					
Pld	W	D	L	GF	GA	GD	Pts	W	D	L	GF	GA	GD	W	D	L	GF	GA	GD
34	10	13	11	55	51	+4	43	5	8	4	25	24	+1	5	5	7	30	27	+3

==== Results by round ====
Round	1	2	3	4	5	6	7	8	9	10	11	12	13	14	15	16	17	18	19	20	21	22	23	24	25	26	27	28	29	30	31	32	33	34
Ground	H	A	H	A	H	A	H	A	H	H	A	A	H	A	A	H	H	A	H	A	H	A	A	H	H	A	H	A	H	A	H	A	H	A
Result	L	L	L	D	D	W	D	L	L	W	L	D	W	W	L	W	D	W	D	D	D	L	D	L	D	L	D	D	W	L	W	W	D	W
Position																																		8

A = Away; H = Home; W = Win; D = Draw; L = Loss

==== Matches ====
===== 1st half =====
7 August 2016 Week 1	FC Groningen	0-5	Feyenoord	Groningen
18:30		Report	Tonny Vilhena 19'; Eljero Elia 36' 45' 56'; Nicolai Jørgensen 83'	Stadium: Euroborg; Attendance: 19,762

13 August 2016 Week 2	Excelsior Rotterdam	2–0	FC Groningen	Rotterdam
18:30	Jurgen Mattheij 2'; Kevin Vermeulen 90+3'	Report		Stadium: Van Donge & De Roo Stadion; Attendance: 3,200

21 August 2016 Week 3	FC Groningen	3-4	FC Twente	Groningen
12:30	Mimoun Mahi 52'; Oussama Idrissi 69'; Danny Hoesen 84'	Report	Enes Ünal 23' 36' 39'; Jari Oosterwijk 90+2'	Stadium: Euroborg; Attendance: 18,051

28 August 2016 Week 4	PSV Eindhoven	0-0	FC Groningen	Eindhoven
12:30		Report		Stadium: Philips Stadion; Attendance: 33,000

11 September 2016 Week 5	FC Groningen	1–1	Sparta Rotterdam	Groningen
14:30	Mimoun Mahi 11'	Report	Zakaria El Azzouzi 18'	Stadium: Euroborg; Attendance: 17,845

16 September 2016 Week 6	FC Utrecht	1-5	FC Groningen	Utrecht
20:00	Richairo Živković 60'	Report	Oussama Idrissi 13' 44'; Danny Hoesen 66' 90+3'; Tom van Weert 80'	Stadium: Stadion Galgenwaard; Attendance: 15,217

24 September 2016 Week 7	FC Groningen	0–0	Heracles Almelo	Groningen
18:30		Report		Stadium: Euroborg; Attendance: 18,272

2 October 2016 Week 8	SBV Vitesse	2-1	FC Groningen	Arnhem
18:30	Lewis Baker 44'; Kelvin Leerdam 76'	Report	Danny Hoesen 4' (pen.)	Stadium: GelreDome; Attendance: 15,055

15 October 2016 Week 9	FC Groningen	0-3	SC Heerenveen	Groningen
20:45		Report	Arbër Zeneli 7'; Sam Larsson 73'; Reza Ghoochannejhad 82'	Stadium: Euroborg; Attendance: 21,155

23 October 2016 Week 10	FC Groningen	2–0	AZ Alkmaar	Groningen
14:30	Bryan Linssen 18'; Tom van Weert 45+2'	Report		Stadium: Euroborg; Attendance: 21,565

29 October 2016 Week 11	Willem II	2–1	FC Groningen	Tilburg
18:30	Thom Haye 66'; Bartholomew Ogbeche 85'	Report	Mimoun Mahi 75'	Stadium: Koning Willem II Stadion; Attendance: 12,700

5 November 2016 Week 12	NEC Nijmegen	1-1	FC Groningen	Nijmegen
19:45	Ferdi Kadıoğlu 83'	Report	Tom van Weert 78'	Stadium: Goffertstadion; Attendance: 10,750

19 November 2016 Week 13	FC Groningen	2–1	ADO Den Haag	Groningen
20:45	Hans Hateboer 10'; Tom van Weert 54'	Report	Édouard Duplan 42'	Stadium: Euroborg; Attendance: 17,818

26 November 2016 Week 14	PEC Zwolle	0-4	FC Groningen	Zwolle
19:45		Report	Simon Tibbling 1'; Tom van Weert 39'; Albert Rusnák 77'; Mimoun Mahi 11'	Stadium: MAC³PARK Stadion; Attendance: 13,000

4 December 2016 Week 15	AFC Ajax	2-0	FC Groningen	Amsterdam
16:45	Davinson Sánchez 9'; Hakim Ziyech 72' (pen.)	Report		Stadium: Johan Cruyff Arena; Attendance: 50,667

9 December 2016 Week 16	FC Groningen	2-0	Roda JC Kerkrade	Groningen
20:00	Mimoun Mahi 10'; Alexander Sørloth 71'	Report		Stadium: Euroborg; Attendance: 19,179

18 December 2016 Week 17	FC Groningen	1-1	Go Ahead Eagles	Groningen
14:30	Mimoun Mahi 20'	Report	Jarchinio Antonia 31'	Stadium: Euroborg; Attendance: 19,442

===== 2nd half =====
14 January 2017 Week 18	Heracles Almelo	1-4	FC Groningen	Almelo
19:45	Daryl van Mieghem 90'	Report	Mimoun Mahi 30' 87'; Desevio Payne 34'; Alexander Sørloth 39'	Stadium: Erve Asito; Attendance: 10,513

21 January 2017 Week 19	FC Groningen	1-1	SBV Vitesse	Groningen
20:45	Kelvin Leerdam 6' (o.g.)	Report	Navarone Foor 49'	Stadium: Euroborg; Attendance: 18,810

29 January 2017 Week 20	SC Heerenveen	0-0	FC Groningen	Heerenveen
12:30		Report		Stadium: Abe Lenstra Stadion; Attendance: 21,750

5 February 2017 Week 21	FC Groningen	1-1	Excelsior Rotterdam	Groningen
20:45	Mimoun Mahi 48' (pen.)	Report	Anouar Hadouir 80'	Stadium: Euroborg; Attendance: 17,844

11 February 2017 Week 22	Feyenoord	2-0	FC Groningen	Rotterdam
19:45	Jens Toornstra 38' 66'	Report		Stadium: De Kuip; Attendance: 47,500

19 February 2017 Week 23	Sparta Rotterdam	2-2	FC Groningen	Rotterdam
14:30	Paco van Moorsel 8'; Iván Calero 17'	Report	Ruben Jenssen 21'; Mimoun Mahi 44'	Stadium: Het Kasteel; Attendance: 9,778

25 February 2017 Week 24	FC Groningen	2-3	FC Utrecht	Groningen
18:30	Bryan Linssen 4' 45'	Report	Sébastien Haller 54'; Giovanni Troupée 79'; Yassin Ayoub 82'	Stadium: Euroborg; Attendance: 21,458

5 March 2017 Week 25	FC Groningen	1-1	AFC Ajax	Groningen
14:30	Bryan Linssen 56'	Report	Davy Klaassen 82'	Stadium: Euroborg; Attendance: 22,312

12 March 2017 Week 26	Roda JC Kerkrade	3–1	FC Groningen	Kerkrade
14:30	Abdul Jeleel Ajagun 31'; Christian Kum 54'; Dani Schahin 66'	Report	Bryan Linssen 73'	Stadium: Parkstad Limburg Stadion; Attendance: 12,870

18 March 2017 Week 27	FC Groningen	1-1	Willem II	Groningen
18:30	Ruben Jenssen 49'	Report	Obbi Oularé 54'	Stadium: Euroborg; Attendance: 19,959

1 April 2017 Week 28	AZ Alkmaar	0-0	FC Groningen	Alkmaar
18:30		Report		Stadium: AFAS Stadion; Attendance: 14,828

5 April 2017 Week 29	FC Groningen	2-0	NEC Nijmegen	Groningen
19:45	Mimoun Mahi 30'; Juninho Bacuna 67'	Report		Stadium: Euroborg; Attendance: 18,069

8 April 2017 Week 30	ADO Den Haag	4-3	FC Groningen	The Hague
19:45	Danny Bakker 13'; Dion Malone 21' 47'; Mike Havenaar 23'	Report	Mimoun Mahi 52' (pen.); Bryan Linssen 64' 90+4'	Stadium: Bingoal Stadion; Attendance: 11,348

16 April 2017 Week 31	FC Groningen	5-1	PEC Zwolle	Groningen
14:30	Bryan Linssen 14' 38'; Mimoun Mahi 19' 53'; Ajdin Hrustic 88'	Report	Nicolai Brock-Madsen 46'	Stadium: Euroborg; Attendance: 21,666

22 April 2017 Week 32	Go Ahead Eagles	2-3	FC Groningen	Deventer
20:45	Sam Hendriks 74'; Darren Maatsen 89'	Report	Mimoun Mahi 37' 90+3'; Jesper Drost 80'	Stadium: De Adelaarshorst; Attendance: 9,383

7 May 2017 Week 33	FC Groningen	1-1	PSV Eindhoven	Groningen
14:30	Mimoun Mahi 11'	Report	Sam Lammers 59'	Stadium: Euroborg; Attendance: 20,791

14 May 2017 Week 34	FC Twente	3-5	FC Groningen	Enschede
14:30	Dylan George 19'; Mateusz Klich 64'; Enes Ünal 85'	Report	Bryan Linssen 2'; Oussama Idrissi 25' 29'; Stefan Thesker 43' (o.g.); Alexander Sørloth 66'	Stadium: De Grolsch Veste; Attendance: 26,200

17 May 2017 European competition playoff 1st game	FC Groningen	1-4	AZ Alkmaar	Groningen
20:45	Jesper Drost 68'	Report	Alireza Jahanbakhsh 45'; Wout Weghorst 66' 90+2'; Calvin Stengs 74'	Stadium: Euroborg; Attendance: 20,610

20 May 2017 European competition playoff 2nd game	AZ Alkmaar	4-1	FC Groningen	Alkmaar
20:45	Wout Weghorst 9'; Joris van Overeem 54' 82'; Calvin Stengs 62'	Report	Bryan Linssen 37'	Stadium: AFAS Stadion; Attendance: 10,413

AZ Alkmaar won 8–2 on aggregate.

=== KNVB Cup ===
20 September 2016 Third round	VV Capelle	0-4	FC Groningen	Capelle aan den IJssel
17:00		Report	Danny Hoesen 10'; Tom van Weert 15'; Hans Hateboer 65'; Alexander Sørloth 79'	Stadium: Sportpark 't Slot; Attendance: 1,500

26 October 2016 Second round	FC Utrecht	1–0	FC Groningen	Utrecht
20:00	Nacer Barazite 90+2'	Report		Stadium: Stadion Galgenwaard; Attendance: 16,377

== Statistics ==
=== Scorers ===
#	Player	Eredivisie	KNVB	Total
1	(Morocco) Mimoun Mahi	17	0	17
2	(Netherlands) Bryan Linssen	11	0	11
3	(Netherlands) Tom van Weert	5	1	6
4	(Netherlands) Danny Hoesen	4	1	5
4	(Morocco) Oussama Idrissi	5	0	5
6	(Norway) Alexander Sørloth	3	1	4
7	(Netherlands) Jesper Drost	2	0	2
7	(Norway) Ruben Jenssen	2	0	2
9	(Australia) Ajdin Hrustic	1	0	1
9	(Slovakia) Albert Rusnák	1	0	1
9	(United States) Desevio Payne	1	0	1
9	(Netherlands) Hans Hateboer	0	1	1
9	(Curaçao) Juninho Bacuna	1	0	1
9	(Sweden) Simon Tibbling	1	0	1

=== Appearances ===
#	Player	Eredivisie	KNVB	Total
1	(Netherlands) Sergio Padt	36	2	38
2	(Norway) Ruben Jenssen	35	2	37
3	(Morocco) Mimoun Mahi	32	2	34
4	(Netherlands) Bryan Linssen	30	1	31
5	(Netherlands) Etiënne Reijnen	29	1	30
5	(Morocco) Oussama Idrissi	29	1	30
7	(Norway) Alexander Sørloth	27	1	28
7	(Sweden) Simon Tibbling	26	2	28
9	(Bosnia and Herzegovina) Samir Memišević	26	1	27
9	(Netherlands) Tom Hiariej	25	2	27
11	(Curaçao) Juninho Bacuna	26	0	26
12	(Denmark) Kasper Larsen	23	2	25
12	(Netherlands) Yoell van Nieff	23	2	25
14	(Australia) Jason Davidson	22	0	22
15	(Netherlands) Hans Hateboer	19	2	21
16	(Netherlands) Jesper Drost	19	0	19
16	(Netherlands) Tom van Weert	19	0	19
18	(Slovakia) Albert Rusnák	13	2	15
19	(Netherlands) Danny Hoesen	10	2	12
20	(Australia) Ajdin Hrustic	7	0	7
21	(United States) Desevio Payne	6	0	6
22	(Netherlands) Hedwiges Maduro	5	0	5
23	(Curaçao) Jarchinio Antonia	3	0	3
24	(Netherlands) Glenn Bijl	2	0	2
24	(Netherlands) Martijn Van Der Laan	2	0	2
26	(Netherlands) Roland Baas	1	0	1

=== Clean sheets ===
#	Player	Eredivisie	KNVB	Total
1	(Netherlands) Sergio Padt	7	1	8
Total		7	1	8

=== Disciplinary record ===
#	Player	Eredivisie		KNVB		Total	
#	Player	Yellow card	Red card	Yellow card	Red card	Yellow card	Red card
1	(Curaçao) Juninho Bacuna	4	3	0	0	4	3
2	(Bosnia and Herzegovina) Samir Memišević	1	2	0	0	1	2
3	(Netherlands) Bryan Linssen	5	1	1	0	6	1
4	(Australia) Jason Davidson	2	1	0	0	2	1
5	(Netherlands) Hans Hateboer	6	0	0	0	6	0
6	(Norway) Ruben Jenssen	5	0	0	0	5	0
6	(Sweden) Simon Tibbling	4	0	1	0	5	0
8	(Netherlands) Tom Hiariej	4	0	0	0	4	0
9	(Norway) Alexander Sørloth	3	0	0	0	3	0
10	(United States) Desevio Payne	2	0	0	0	2	0
10	(Netherlands) Etiënne Reijnen	2	0	0	0	2	0
10	(Denmark) Kasper Larsen	2	0	0	0	2	0
10	(Morocco) Mimoun Mahi	1	0	1	0	2	0
10	(Morocco) Oussama Idrissi	2	0	0	0	2	0
15	(Slovakia) Albert Rusnák	1	0	0	0	1	0
15	(Netherlands) Glenn Bijl	1	0	0	0	1	0
15	(Netherlands) Hedwiges Maduro	1	0	0	0	1	0
15	(Netherlands) Jesper Drost	1	0	0	0	1	0
15	(Netherlands) Tom van Weert	1	0	0	0	1	0
