= Zwarthoed =

Zwarthoed is a Dutch surname. Notable people with the surname include:

- Julie Zwarthoed (born 1994), Dutch ice hockey player
- Theo Zwarthoed (born 1982), Dutch footballer
