= Snepvangers =

Snepvangers is a surname. Notable people with the surname include:

- Bram Snepvangers (born 1976), Dutch Magic: The Gathering player
- Diego Snepvangers (born 1998), Dutch footballer
