= Marcus Edwards =

Cypriot footballer (born 1998)

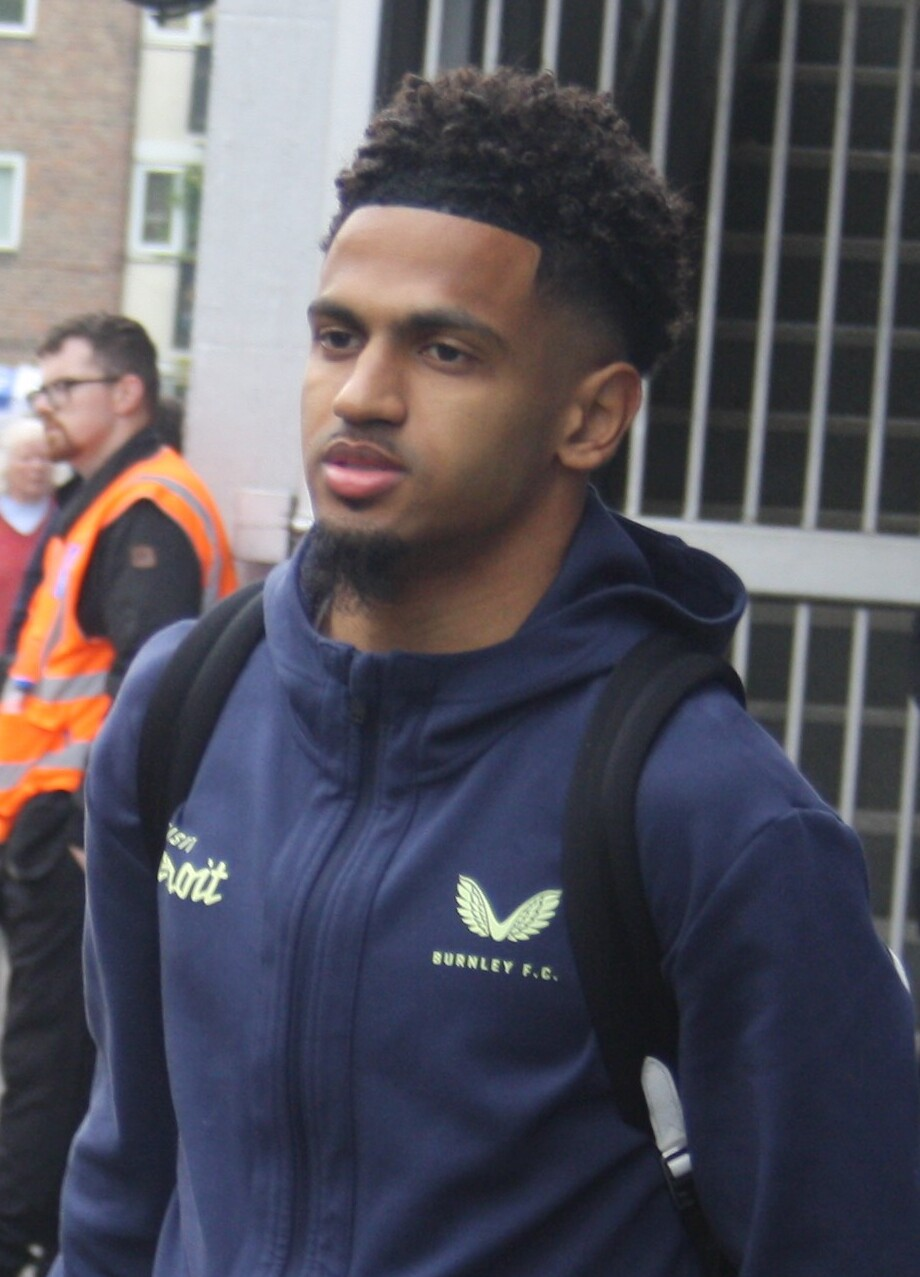
- Edwards in 2025

Personal information
- Full name: Marcus Edwards
- Date of birth: 3 December 1998 (age 27)
- Place of birth: Enfield, England
- Height: 5 ft 6 in (1.68 m)
- Positions: Right winger; attacking midfielder

Team information
- Current team: Burnley
- Number: 10

Youth career
- 2006–2015: Tottenham Hotspur

Senior career*
Years	Team	Apps	(Gls)
2015–2019	Tottenham Hotspur	0	(0)
2017–2018	→ Norwich City (loan)	1	(0)
2018–2019	→ Excelsior (loan)	25	(2)
2019–2022	Vitória de Guimarães	77	(17)
2022–2025	Sporting CP	77	(15)
2025	→ Burnley (loan)	14	(1)
2025–	Burnley	34	(3)

International career^{‡}
2013–2014	England U16	6	(1)
2014–2015	England U17	21	(5)
2015–2016	England U18	7	(4)
2016–2017	England U19	7	(2)
2017–2018	England U20	8	(2)
2026–	Cyprus	6	(2)
- * Club domestic league appearances and goals as of 00:43, 8 November 2026 (UTC) ‡ National team caps and goals as of 20:53, 15 November 2026 (UTC)

Marcus Edwards (born 3 December 1998) is a professional footballer who plays as a right winger or attacking midfielder for EFL Championship club Burnley. Born in England, he represents the Cyprus national team.

Edwards began his senior career at Tottenham Hotspur, where he made one substitute appearance in the EFL Cup. He moved to Vitória de Guimarães in 2019 and was transferred to Sporting in January 2022 for an initial €7.67 million. He has played over 100 Primeira Liga matches and holds the record for most goals by an English player in the competition.

Edwards earned 49 caps for England from under-16 to under-20 level, scoring 15 goals. He was part of the under-19 team that won the 2017 UEFA European Under-19 Championship. He switched international allegiance to Cyprus in September 2026 and scored on his senior international debut later that month.

== Early life ==
Edwards was born on 3 December 1998 in Enfield, England, to an English father and a Greek Cypriot mother. Through his father, he is of Jamaican and French descent. He was eligible to represent England, France and Jamaica through his father, and Cyprus through his mother.

Edwards has said that he visited Cyprus every summer while growing up and that much of his maternal family is from near Nicosia. He joined the academy system at Tottenham Hotspur at the age of eight, progressing through the ranks and initially playing as a centre forward.

== Club career ==
=== Tottenham Hotspur ===
On 2 August 2016, Edwards signed his first professional contract with Tottenham after a protracted period of negotiations amid interest from other clubs.

Edwards joined Tottenham's first team for their pre-season tour in the summer of 2016. He was assigned squad number 48 ahead of the 2016–17 season. On 20 September 2016, manager Mauricio Pochettino likened Edwards to a young Lionel Messi because of his low centre of gravity and ability to beat opponents.

The following day, Edwards made his competitive first-team debut in an EFL Cup third-round match at home to Gillingham. He replaced Vincent Janssen for the final 15 minutes and had a shot saved by Stuart Nelson as Tottenham won 5–0. He suffered an ankle injury in October that required surgery and kept him out for an extended period.

On 29 July 2017, Edwards signed a new contract with Tottenham running until 2020. In the 2017–18 UEFA Youth League, he scored twice in a 4–0 win over Borussia Dortmund on 13 September. He made five appearances in the group stage and scored four goals.

==== Loan spells ====
In January 2018, Edwards joined Championship club Norwich City on loan for the remainder of the 2017–18 season. He made his Norwich debut on 30 March, coming on as a late substitute for Mario Vrančić in a 2–0 home defeat to Fulham. It was his only appearance for the club, and he returned to Tottenham on 10 April for "personal reasons".

In August 2018, Edwards joined Dutch club Excelsior on a season-long loan. On 25 September, he was sent off in a 3–2 extra-time home defeat to NEC in the first round of the KNVB Cup, receiving two bookings within six minutes late in the match.

Edwards scored two goals and provided four assists in 25 league appearances. He also scored in the relegation play-offs, but Excelsior were relegated. He finished the Eredivisie season with 3.3 successful dribbles per game, the highest figure in the league and ahead of Steven Bergwijn on 3.2.

=== Vitória de Guimarães ===
On 2 September 2019, Portuguese Primeira Liga club Vitória de Guimarães signed Edwards on a four-year contract, acquiring 50% of his economic rights and setting a €15 million release clause. He scored his first goal for the club on 24 October in the UEFA Europa League group stage, opening the scoring in a 3–2 defeat away to Arsenal.

With seven goals and five assists during the 2019–20 Primeira Liga season, Edwards was one of ten candidates for the league's player of the year award. On 8 February 2020, he and João Carlos Teixeira each scored twice in a 7–0 away win over local rivals Famalicão.

Edwards scored the only goal in an away win over Boavista on 19 October 2020, his eighth goal in Portugal's top division. The goal took him past Brian Deane, who played for Benfica in 1998, as the highest-scoring English player in Primeira Liga history.

On 7 January 2021, Edwards extended his contract until 2024, with a release clause of €50 million. On 10 January 2022, he came on as a substitute away to Gil Vicente, won and converted a penalty in the 87th minute and was later sent off for a second booking as Vitória lost 3–2.

=== Sporting CP ===
Edwards transferred to reigning Primeira Liga champions Sporting CP on 31 January 2022 for €7.67 million, with a further €500,000 dependent on objectives. Sporting acquired Vitória's 50% share of his economic rights, while Bruno Gaspar moved in the opposite direction permanently and Geny Catamo joined Vitória on loan.

He made his Sporting debut two days later in a 4–1 away win over B-SAD, replacing Pablo Sarabia for the final 19 minutes. His first goal for the club came on 19 March against former club Vitória de Guimarães, when he scored from long range in the eighth minute of stoppage time to complete a 3–1 away win.

On 7 September 2022, Edwards scored his first UEFA Champions League goal and provided an assist in a 3–0 away win over Eintracht Frankfurt. On 26 October, he scored in a 1–1 away draw against his former club Tottenham Hotspur.

During Sporting's run to the 2022–23 Taça da Liga final, Edwards scored in a 6–0 group-stage win over Farense and in a 5–0 quarter-final victory against Braga. He started the final on 28 January 2023, a 2–0 defeat to Porto, and had a goal ruled out for offside.

In January 2023, Sporting acquired a further 15% of Edwards's economic rights from Tottenham as part of the deal that saw Pedro Porro move to Tottenham, initially on loan and later permanently.

=== Burnley ===
On 3 February 2025, Edwards returned to England, joining Championship club Burnley on loan until the end of the season. Five days later, he scored on his debut, netting the only goal in a win over Southampton in the fourth round of the 2024–25 FA Cup. On 20 May, Burnley announced that Edwards would join the club permanently.

== International career ==
=== Youth ===
Edwards made his England U16 debut in November 2013, playing 80 minutes in a 1–0 defeat to Northern Ireland. He made six appearances and scored once at under-16 level.

For the England under-17 team, Edwards scored three times during 2014, including twice on his debut in a 5–1 win over Iceland. He was selected for the 2015 UEFA European Under-17 Championship. Edwards made five appearances at the tournament and scored against Italy and the Republic of Ireland. He was named in the team of the tournament. He also represented England at the 2015 FIFA U-17 World Cup.

In September 2015, Edwards was called up to the England U18 squad and made his debut in a 2–0 win over the Netherlands, setting up one of the goals. In March 2016, he scored twice against both Austria and the Republic of Ireland. He made seven appearances and scored four goals for England U18.

Edwards was called up to the England under-19 team in October 2016. He made his debut in a 3–1 win over Croatia and scored in a subsequent 2–1 win over Bulgaria. He was selected for the 2017 UEFA European Under-19 Championship. In the semi-final, he came off the bench and assisted Lukas Nmecha for the only goal against the Czech Republic. He was also a second-half substitute in England's victory over Portugal in the final.

After the tournament, Edwards was called up to the England U20 squad in August 2017 and scored on his debut in a 3–0 win over the Netherlands.

=== Senior ===
In 2026, Edwards announced his intention to represent Cyprus at senior international level. He received his Cypriot passport in September and was called up to the national team.

On 25 September 2026, Edwards made his senior international debut and scored in a 2–1 away defeat to Montenegro in the UEFA Nations League. On 5 October, he scored in the fourth minute of stoppage time to give Cyprus a 2–1 home win over Latvia.

== Career statistics ==
=== Club ===
As of match played 7 November 2026

Appearances and goals by club, season and competition
Club	Season	League			National cup (Note: Includes KNVB Cup, Taça de Portugal and FA Cup.)		League cup (Note: Includes EFL Cup and Taça da Liga.)		Europe		Other		Total	
Club	Season	Division	Apps	Goals	Apps	Goals	Apps	Goals	Apps	Goals	Apps	Goals	Apps	Goals
Tottenham Hotspur	2016–17	Premier League	0	0	0	0	1	0	0	0	—		1	0
Tottenham Hotspur U21	2017–18	—			—		—		—		1 (Note: Appearance in EFL Trophy.)	0	1	0
Norwich City (loan)	2017–18	Championship	1	0	—		—		—		—		1	0
Excelsior (loan)	2018–19	Eredivisie	25	2	1	0	—		—		2 (Note: Appearances in Eredivisie relegation play-offs.)	0	28	2
Vitória de Guimarães	2019–20	Primeira Liga	26	7	0	0	4	0	5 (Note: Appearances in UEFA Europa League.)	2	—		35	9
Vitória de Guimarães	2020–21	Primeira Liga	33	3	2	0	1	0	—		—		36	3
Vitória de Guimarães	2021–22	Primeira Liga	18	7	2	1	4	0	—		—		24	8
Vitória de Guimarães	Total		77	17	4	1	9	0	5	2	—		95	20
Sporting CP	2021–22	Primeira Liga	12	3	2	0	—		1 (Note: Appearance in UEFA Champions League.)	0	—		15	3
Sporting CP	2022–23	Primeira Liga	33	7	1	0	5	2	12 (Note: Six appearances and two goals in the UEFA Champions League, and six appearances and one goal in the UEFA Europa League.)	3	—		51	12
Sporting CP	2023–24	Primeira Liga	26	4	5	1	3	0	10	1	—		44	6
Sporting CP	2024–25	Primeira Liga	6	1	1	2	1	0	1	0	1 (Note: Appearance in Supertaça Cândido de Oliveira.)	0	10	3
Sporting CP	Total		77	15	9	3	9	2	24	4	1	0	120	24
Burnley (loan)	2024–25	Championship	14	1	2	1	—		—		—		16	2
Burnley	2025–26	Premier League	23	1	1	0	2	0	—		—		26	1
Burnley	2026–27	Championship	11	2	0	0	2	0	—		—		13	2
Burnley	Total		48	4	3	1	4	0	—		—		55	5
Career total			228	38	17	5	23	2	29	6	4	0	301	51

=== International ===
As of match played 15 November 2026

Appearances and goals by national team and year
National team	Year	Apps	Goals
Cyprus	2026	6	2
Total		6	2

Scores and results list Cyprus' goal tally first; the score column indicates the score after each Edwards goal.

List of international goals scored by Marcus Edwards
No.	Date	Venue	Opponent	Score	Result	Competition
1	25 September 2026	Podgorica City Stadium, Podgorica, Montenegro	Montenegro	1–0	1–2	2026–27 UEFA Nations League C
2	5 October 2026	GSP Stadium, Strovolos, Cyprus	Latvia	2–1	2–1	2026–27 UEFA Nations League C

== Honours ==
Sporting CP

- Primeira Liga: 2023–24, 2024–25
- Taça de Portugal: 2024–25

England U19

- UEFA European Under-19 Championship: 2017

Individual

- UEFA European U-17 Championship Team of the Tournament: 2015
