= Redouan El Hankouri =

Dutch footballer (born 2001)

Personal information
- Date of birth: 3 February 2001 (age 25)
- Place of birth: Rotterdam, Netherlands
- Height: 1.68 m (5 ft 6 in)
- Position: Midfielder

Team information
- Current team: Westlandia

Youth career
- Spartaan '20

Senior career*
Years	Team	Apps	(Gls)
2018–2021	Excelsior	6	(0)
2022	Excelsior Maassluis	10	(0)
2022–2025	SteDoCo	63	(11)
2025–2026	Zwaluwen		
2026–	Westlandia		

International career
2018	Morocco U20	1	(0)
- * Club domestic league appearances and goals as of 19:19, 19 July 2025 (UTC)

Redouan El Hankouri (Arabic: رضوان الحنقوري; born 3 February 2001) is a Moroccan professional footballer who plays as a midfielder for Westlandia.

== Club career ==
El Hankouri made his professional debut for Excelsior in a 2–0 Eredivisie win over NAC Breda on 25 August 2018. He moved to Excelsior Maassluis in March 2022 after an injury-plagued spell in Kralingen.

He joined Westlandia in summer 2026 after a season at Zwaluwen.

== International career ==
Born in the Netherlands, El Hankouri is of Moroccan descent. He debuted for the Morocco U20s in a 1–0 friendly win over the DR Congo U20s in October 2018.

== Personal life ==
El Hankouri is the younger brother of the Moroccan footballer Mohamed El Hankouri.
