= Tom Hiariej =

Dutch footballer (born 1988)

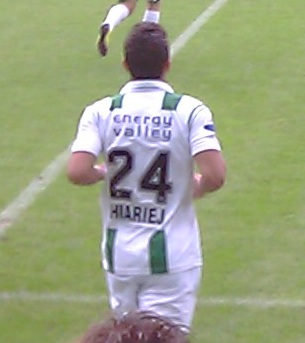
- Hiariej with Groningen in 2011

Personal information
- Full name: Tom Jan Hiariej
- Date of birth: 25 July 1988 (age 38)
- Place of birth: Winschoten, Netherlands
- Height: 1.78 m (5 ft 10 in)
- Positions: Defensive midfielder; right-back

Youth career
- –1998: ZNC
- 1998–1999: GRC
- 1999–2007: Groningen

Senior career*
Years	Team	Apps	(Gls)
2007–2017	Groningen	146	(3)
2013	→ Emmen (loan)	12	(0)
2016	→ Cambuur (loan)	10	(0)
2017–2019	Central Coast Mariners	37	(0)
2019–2020	Emmen	17	(0)
Total		222	(3)

International career
2003–2004	Netherlands U16	8	(0)
2004–2005	Netherlands U17	14	(1)
2006–2007	Netherlands U19	7	(0)
2008–2009	Netherlands U20	8	(0)
2008	Netherlands U21	2	(0)
Medal record
Men's football
Representing Netherlands
FIFA U-17 World Championship
Bronze medal – third place	2005
- * Club domestic league appearances and goals

Tom Jan Hiariej (/ˈtɒm hiːˈɑːriːeɪ/; born 25 July 1988) is a Dutch former professional footballer who played as a defensive midfielder or right-back. He is of Moluccan descent.

== Club career ==
The son of a Moluccan father and a Dutch mother, Hiariej hails from Zuidbroek and made his professional first team debut in 2007 with Eredivisie side FC Groningen under long-time head coach Ron Jans. Hiariej scored his first professional goal on 23 January 2008 in a match against NEC.

During his time at Groningen, Hiariej was sent on loan twice; to Emmen and Cambuur. In May 2017, he moved to Australia to play in Gosford for the Central Coast Mariners. After practicing with the first team for a few weeks, he signed another one-year contract with Emmen in July 2019. He left the club at the expiration of his contract, after losing his starting spot to Hilal Ben Moussa.

== International career ==
Hiarej is also a Dutch youth international; he played a number of matches for several youth teams. He was also part of the Netherlands under-17 team, who ended up third in the 2005 FIFA U-17 World Championship.

Netherlands under-17 coach, Ruud Kaiser was very impressed by the young defender. Before the youth FIFA U-17 World Cup in Peru, Kaiser said about Hiariej: "When Hiariej plays for his club, he plays central defender, but here he plays right-back. He is talented and quick. He also has the qualities to come up in attack; he sees the chances".

Hiariej would also make appearances for the Netherlands under-21 team.

== Honours ==
Groningen

- KNVB Cup: 2014–15

Netherlands U17

- FIFA U-17 World Championship: third place 2005
