= Robin van der Meer =

Dutch footballer (born 1995)

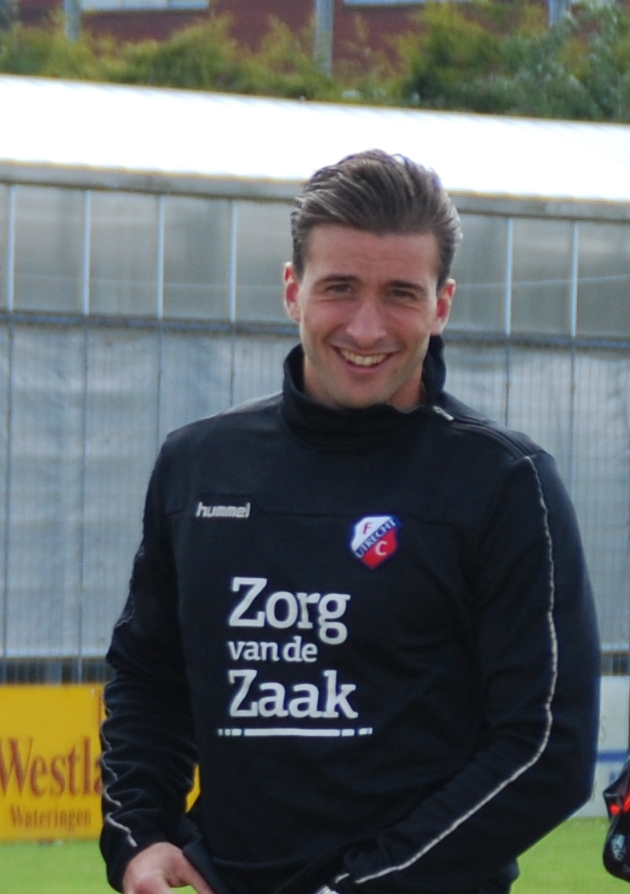

Personal information
- Date of birth: 21 February 1995 (age 31)
- Place of birth: Voorburg, Netherlands
- Height: 1.96 m (6 ft 5 in)
- Position: Centre-back

Team information
- Current team: Westlandia

Youth career
- RVC Rijswijk
- –2007: Haaglandia
- 2007–2014: ADO Den Haag

Senior career*
| Years | Team | Apps | (Gls) |
| 2014–2016 | Go Ahead Eagles | 28 | (0) |
| 2016–2018 | Utrecht | 27 | (0) |
| 2016–2018 | Jong Utrecht | 8 | (0) |
| 2018–2021 | Excelsior | 51 | (1) |
| 2021–2023 | Helmond Sport | 59 | (1) |
| 2023–2025 | Rijnsburgse Boys | 19 | (0) |
| 2025– | Westlandia | 0 | (0) |

International career
| 2011–2012 | Netherlands U17 | 8 | (0) |
- * Club domestic league appearances and goals as of 16:57, 23 August 2025 (UTC)

Robin van der Meer (born 21 February 1995) is a Dutch professional footballer who plays as a centre-back for Vierde Divisie club Westlandia. He formerly played for Go Ahead Eagles, FC Utrecht, Excelsior and Helmond Sport.

== Club career ==
Van der Meer played in the youth departments of RVC Rijswijk and Haaglandia, after which he was included in the youth academy of ADO Den Haag in 2007. He progressed through the youth teams before being promoted to the reserve team.

In May 2014, Van der Meer signed a contract with Go Ahead Eagles until 2016, with an option for another season. He extended that contract in January 2015 until 2017, with another option for an extra season. Van der Meer made his professional debut on 24 August 2015, when he played a league match in the Eerste Divisie against FC Den Bosch, which ended in a 4–2 win. He came onto the pitch for Kenny Teijsse in the 82nd minute. At the end of the 2015–16 season, Go Ahead, with Van der Meer as a starter, promoted to the Eredivisie via promotion play-offs. This resulted in interest from larger clubs, ending in a move to FC Utrecht, where Van der Meer signed a four-year deal. He made his UEFA Europa League debut with the club a year later in a 0–0 draw against Lech Poznań on 27 July 2017.

In 2018, Van der Meer signed with Excelsior. In December 2019, he ruptured his ACL, which sidelined him for at least nine months.

On 28 June 2021, he signed a two-year contract with Helmond Sport. His contract with Helmond Sport was terminated early on 27 March 2023.

Two days later, van der Meer signed a two-year contract with the third-tier Tweede Divisie club Rijnsburgse Boys.

== International career ==
Van der Meer played for various Dutch youth teams. In 2011, he won the UEFA European Under-17 Championship with the Netherlands under-17 team and took part in the 2011 FIFA U-17 World Cup. He played three group matches in the tournament.
