= Ali Messaoud =

Dutch footballer

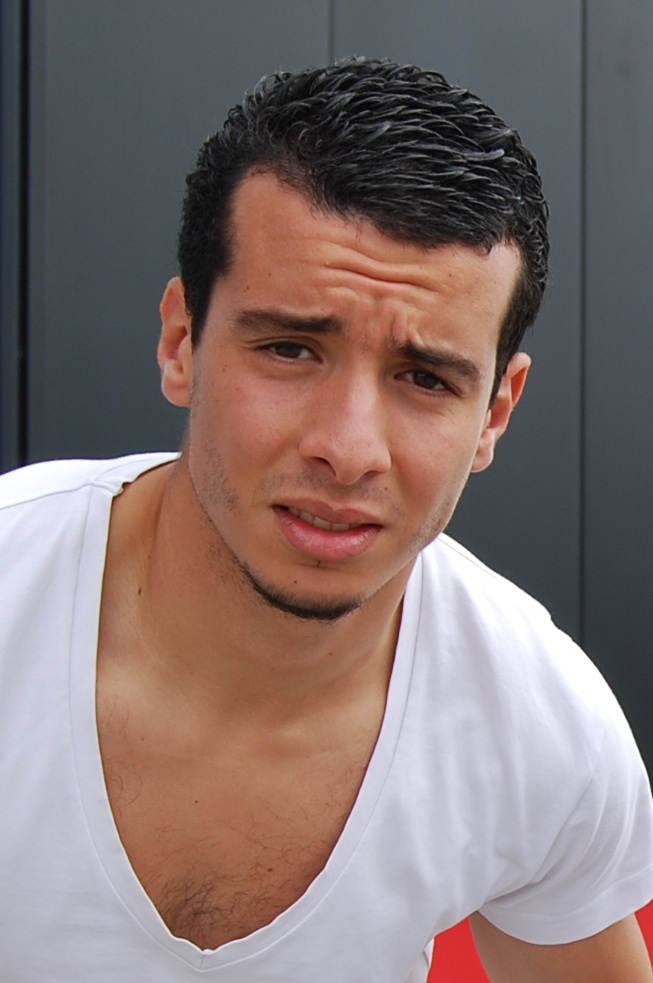
- Messaoud in 2011

Personal information
- Full name: Ali Messaoud
- Date of birth: 13 April 1991 (age 35)
- Place of birth: Amsterdam, Netherlands
- Height: 1.85 m (6 ft 1 in)
- Position: Attacking midfielder

Youth career
- 2008–2009: AZ

Senior career*
Years	Team	Apps	(Gls)
2010–2013	AZ	1	(0)
2013–2015	Willem II	63	(15)
2015–2017	Vaduz	26	(2)
2017	→ NEC (loan)	13	(1)
2017–2019	Excelsior	61	(11)
2019–2021	Vendsyssel	41	(9)
2021	Roda JC	18	(1)
2022	SteDoCo	0	(0)

International career
2010–2011	Morocco U23	2	(0)

Managerial career
- 2022–2023: Vendsyssel (assistant)
- * Club domestic league appearances and goals

Ali Messaoud (born 13 April 1991) is a retired professional footballer who played as an attacking midfielder. Born in the Netherlands, he represented Morocco at under-23 international level.

== Career ==
On 20 July 2019, Danish 1st Division club Vendsyssel FF announced that they had signed Messaoud on a two-year contract. Vendsyssel confirmed on 15 January 2021, that Messaoud had returned to the Netherlands to join Roda JC Kerkrade.

After a spell at SteDoCo in 2022, Messaoud returned to his former club Vendsyssel FF in July 2022, however, as assistant coach under manager Henrik Pedersen. He left the position in August 2023.

== International career ==
Born in the Netherlands to Moroccan parents, Messaoud debuted for the Morocco national under-23 football team in a friendly 1–2 loss to the Ivory Coast U23s on 17 November 2010.

== Career statistics ==
As of 1 July 2019

Appearances and goals by club, season and competition
Club	Season	League			Cup		Other		Total	
Club	Season	Division	Apps	Goals	Apps	Goals	Apps	Goals	Apps	Goals
AZ	2010–11	Eredivisie	0	0	0	0	0	0	0	0
AZ	2011–12	Eredivisie	0	0	1	0	0	0	1	0
AZ	2012–13	Eredivisie	1	0	0	0	0	0	1	0
AZ	Total		1	0	1	0	0	0	2	0
Willem II	2013–14	Eerste Divisie	36	10	1	0	0	0	37	10
Willem II	2014–15	Eredivisie	27	5	1	0	0	0	28	5
Willem II	Total		63	15	2	0	0	0	65	15
Vaduz	2015–16	Swiss Super League	22	1	0	0	3 (Note: Appearances in UEFA Europa League)	0	25	1
Vaduz	2016–17	Swiss Super League	4	1	0	0	2	1	6	2
Vaduz	Total		26	2	0	0	5	1	30	3
NEC (loan)	2016–17	Eredivisie	13	1	0	0	4 (Note: Appearances in Promotion/relegation play-offs)	0	17	1
Excelsior	2017–18	Eredivisie	31	4	1	0	0	0	32	4
Excelsior	2018–19	Eredivisie	30	7	1	0	0	0	31	7
Excelsior	Total		61	11	2	0	0	0	63	11
Career totals			164	29	5	0	9	1	178	30

== Honours ==
Willem II

- Eerste Divisie: 2013–14

Vaduz

- Liechtenstein Football Cup: 2015–16, 2016–17
