= Diego Snepvangers =

Dutch footballer

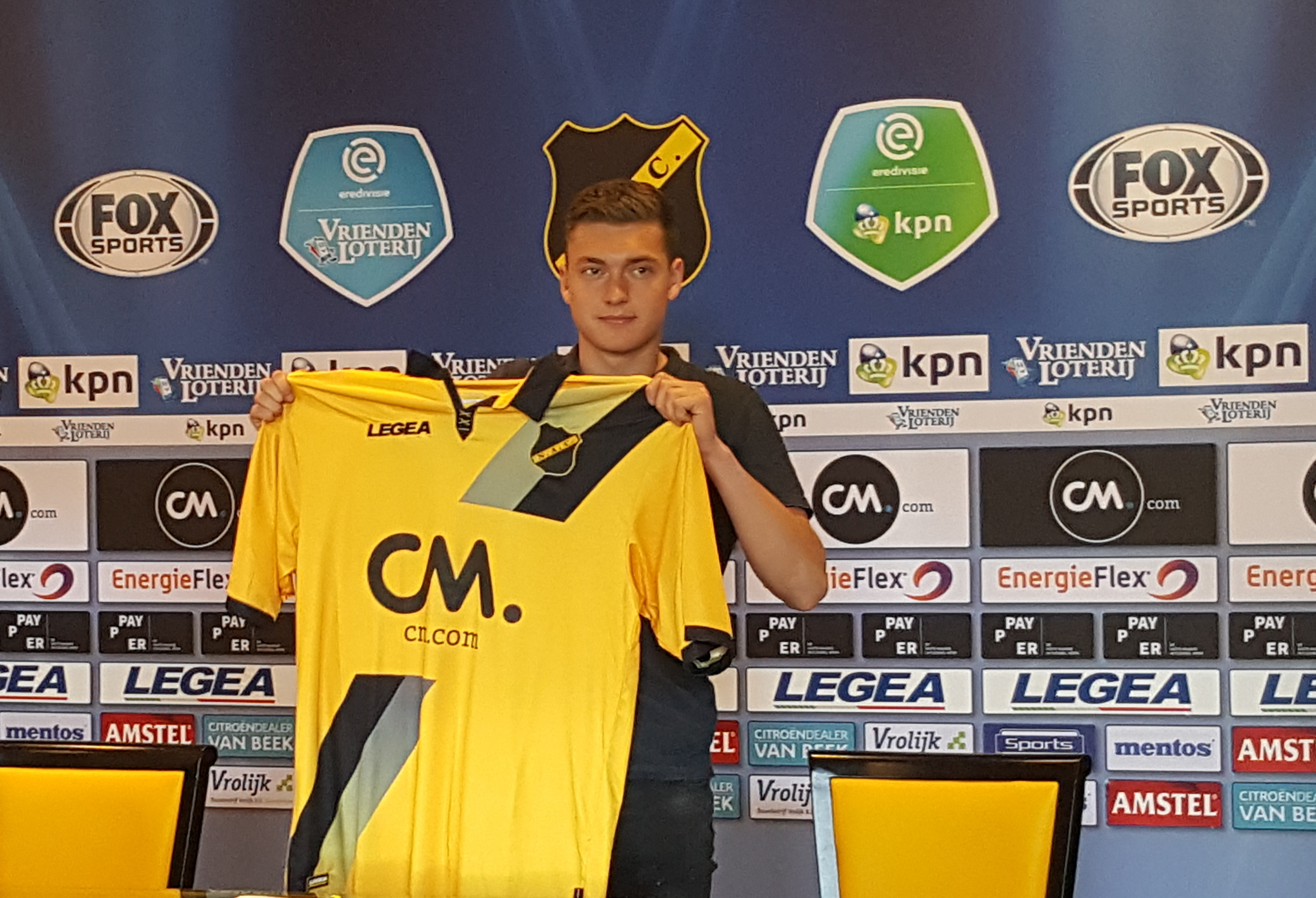

Personal information
- Date of birth: 3 June 1998 (age 28)
- Place of birth: Bergen op Zoom, Netherlands
- Height: 1.75 m (5 ft 9 in)
- Position: Winger

Team information
- Current team: Kozakken Boys
- Number: 7

Youth career
- –2011: RBC
- 2011–2016: NAC Breda

Senior career*
Years	Team	Apps	(Gls)
2016–2020	NAC Breda	2	(0)
2018–2020	→ Helmond Sport (loan)	53	(7)
2020–2021	Spakenburg	3	(0)
2021–2022	ASWH	14	(2)
2022–2023	Kozakken Boys		
2023–	SC Kruisland		
- * Club domestic league appearances and goals as of 11:06, 30 June 2022 (UTC)

Diego Snepvangers (born 3 June 1998) is a Dutch footballer who plays as a winger for Kozakken Boys.

== Club career ==
Snepvangers made his professional debut in the Eerste Divisie for NAC Breda on 25 November 2016 in a game against SC Cambuur. In his second season for NAC, he played in the Eredivisie. In 2018, NAC loaned Snepvangers out to Helmond Sport. His two years at Helmond in the Eerste Divisie were highly productive: 52 caps in regular league games and 7 goals.

In 2020, he moved on to SV Spakenburg in the Tweede Divisie. On 5 May 2021, Snepvangers signed with ASWH. At ASWH he played very little, due to an injury. In May 2022, he signed with Kozakken Boys. In February 2023 it was confirmed, that Snepvangers would join SC Kruisland ahead of the 2023–24 season.
