= Hervé Matthys =

Belgian footballer

Personal information
- Full name: Hervé Jean Matthys
- Date of birth: 19 January 1996 (age 30)
- Place of birth: Bruges, Belgium
- Height: 1.84 m (6 ft 0 in)
- Position: Centre back

Team information
- Current team: AIK
- Number: 3

Youth career
- Cercle Brugge
- 2006–2012: Club Brugge
- 2012–2014: Anderlecht

Senior career*
Years	Team	Apps	(Gls)
2014–2017	Anderlecht	0	(0)
2015–2017	→ Westerlo (loan)	7	(0)
2017–2018	FC Eindhoven	33	(1)
2018–2021	Excelsior	76	(0)
2021–2022	ADO Den Haag	32	(0)
2022–2025	Beerschot	69	(3)
2025–2026	Motor Lublin	37	(0)
2026–	AIK	0	(0)

International career
2013	Belgium U17	4	(0)
2013–2014	Belgium U18	3	(1)
2014–2015	Belgium U19	9	(3)
- * Club domestic league appearances and goals as of 21:32, 29 May 2026 (UTC)

Hervé Jean Matthys (Note: The surname is traditionally pronounced in Dutch as [mɑˈtɛis], reflecting its origin as a regional variant of Matthijs. The player himself, however, uses a French-based pronunciation, realized with a Dutch accent as [mɑˈtis].) (born 19 January 1996) is a Belgian professional footballer who plays as a centre back for Allsvenskan club AIK.

== Club career ==
Matthys joined Anderlecht in 2012 from Club Brugge. He made his first team debut on 3 December 2014 in the Belgian Cup against Mechelen replacing Frank Acheampong at half-time in a 4–1 home win.

On 2 September 2021, he joined ADO Den Haag on a one-year contract.

On 10 April 2022, Matthys signed a two-year contract with Beerschot.

On 17 January 2025, Matthys moved to Polish Ekstraklasa club Motor Lublin, signing an eighteen-month deal with an option for another year. His contract was terminated by mutual consent on 11 July 2026.
