= Lorenzo Burnet =

Dutch footballer (born 1991)

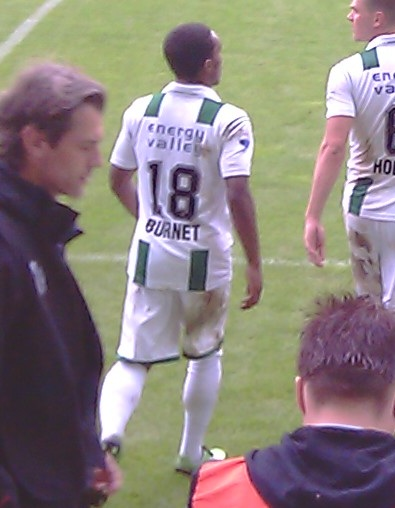
- Burnet with Groningen in 2011

Personal information
- Date of birth: 11 January 1991 (age 35)
- Place of birth: Amsterdam, Netherlands
- Height: 1.70 m (5 ft 7 in)
- Position: Left-back

Youth career
- Zeeburgia
- Ajax

Senior career*
Years	Team	Apps	(Gls)
2011–2016	Groningen	104	(4)
2016–2017	Slovan Bratislava	8	(0)
2017	→ NEC (loan)	9	(0)
2017–2019	Excelsior	33	(0)
2019–2020	Emmen	20	(0)
2020–2021	Køge	10	(0)
2021–2024	Emmen	65	(2)

International career
2007-2008	Netherlands U17	14	(0)
2009-2010	Netherlands U19	8	(3)
2011	Netherlands U21	1	(0)
- * Club domestic league appearances and goals as of 08:45, 13 May 2024 (UTC)

Lorenzo Burnet (born 11 January 1991) is a Dutch professional footballer who plays as a left-back.

== Club career ==
After starting as a footballer at amateur East Amsterdam club AVV Zeeburgia, Burnet joined the top-ranked Ajax Amsterdam youth system in 2004. He spent seven years as a youth player for Ajax but was not offered a senior contract.

In April 2011, Burnet and his team-mate Johan Kappelhof reached a three-year agreement with fellow Eredivisie club Groningen, a club managed by former Ajax youth coach Pieter Huistra. Burnet made his debut in a league game against Roda JC Kerkrade on 7 August 2011. He helped the Green-White Army win the KNVB Cup in 2014–15 against defending champions PEC Zwolle. It was their first major trophy and they qualified for the UEFA Europa League.

In May 2016, he joined Slovak club Slovan Bratislava. After making 8 appearances he was loaned out to NEC Nijmegen.

In June 2017, Burnet signed a two-year deal with Excelsior after his contract with Slovan Bratislava had been dissolved After playing the 2019–20 season for FC Emmen, Burnet moved to Denmark where he signed a season-long deal on 18 October 2020 with Danish 1st Division club HB Køge. He left the club again at the end of the 2020–21 season.

On 15 July 2021, he returned to Emmen on a one-year deal.

== International career ==
Burnet was born in the Netherlands and is of Surinamese descent. Burnet represented the Netherlands at various youth level, including under-17 and under-19.

== Honours ==
Groningen

- KNVB Cup: 2014–15
