= Milan Massop =

Dutch footballer

Personal information
- Full name: Milan Massop
- Date of birth: 1 December 1993 (age 32)
- Place of birth: Zevenaar, Netherlands
- Height: 1.84 m (6 ft 0 in)
- Position: Left-back

Youth career
- 1999–2004: DVV Duiven
- 2004–2011: Vitesse Arnhem
- 2011–2012: De Graafschap

Senior career*
Years	Team	Apps	(Gls)
2012–2015	De Graafschap	45	(1)
2015–2016	FC Eindhoven	32	(0)
2016–2018	Excelsior	41	(6)
2018–2019	Waasland-Beveren	28	(1)
2019–2022	Silkeborg IF	0	(0)
- * Club domestic league appearances and goals as of 14:41, 30 July 2019 (UTC)

Milan Massop (born 1 December 1993 in Zevenaar) is a Dutch professional footballer who plays as a left-back. He formerly played for De Graafschap, FC Eindhoven and SBV Excelsior.

== Career ==
=== Silkeborg IF ===
On 30 July 2019, Danish Superliga club Silkeborg IF confirmed that they had signed Massop on a 3-year contract. He only managed to play one reserve team match for Silkeborg before suffering a serious knee injury, and in September 2019, it was also revealed that Massop and his heavily pregnant girlfriend had lost their unborn child. A year and a half later, in January 2021, Massop was finally back on the training pitch, but it wasn't long before he ran into Achilles tendon problems and was out of action again.

After three years without a single first-team match, it was confirmed in the summer of 2022 that Massop would leave the club, as his contract was expiring.

In September 2024, Massop stated in an interview that he was still living in Silkeborg, with his wife and their two children, and that he was working for the company PowerGo, which sells charging stations for electric cars.
