= Theo Zwarthoed =

Dutch footballer (born 1982)

Personal information
- Full name: Theodorus Antonius Marie Zwarthoed
- Date of birth: 19 November 1982 (age 43)
- Place of birth: Volendam, Netherlands
- Height: 1.88 m (6 ft 2 in)
- Position: Goalkeeper

Youth career
- RKAV Volendam
- Volendam

Senior career*
Years	Team	Apps	(Gls)
2000–2001	Volendam	0	(0)
2001–2008	AZ	20	(0)
2006–2007	→ Excelsior (loan)	26	(0)
2007–2008	→ RKC Waalwijk (loan)	38	(0)
2008–2009	RKC Waalwijk	24	(0)
2009–2011	Volendam	28	(0)
2012–2014	De Graafschap	28	(0)
2014–2015	Volendam	33	(0)
2015–2017	Go Ahead Eagles	64	(0)
2017	De Dijk	0	(0)
2017–2018	Excelsior	16	(0)
2018–2019	NAC Breda	0	(0)
Total		277	(0)
- * Club domestic league appearances and goals

Theodorus "Theo" Antonius Marie Zwarthoed (born 19 November 1982) is a Dutch former professional footballer who played as a goalkeeper.

== Career ==
Zwarthoed was born in Volendam. Having previously been part of the youth system at RKAV Volendam, he joined the youth set-up at FC Volendam. He joined Volendam's first team squad for the 2000–01 season.

Following a transfer to AZ, he made his Eredivisie debut on 20 February 2002, keeping a clean sheet in an away match against Sparta Rotterdam. (0–4) He later played for SBV Excelsior, RKC Waalwijk, De Graafschap, Go Ahead Eagles, De Dijk and NAC Breda.

Zwarthoed retired from active football after the 2018–19 season, after which he continued as goalkeeper coach at AFC as the replacement for Dennis Gentenaar.
