= Desevio Payne =

American soccer player (born 1995)

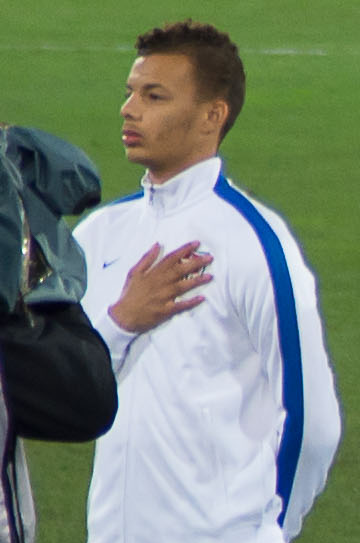
- Payne with the United States at the 2015 FIFA U-20 World Cup

Personal information
- Full name: Desevio Ilan Payne
- Date of birth: November 30, 1995 (age 30)
- Place of birth: Greenwood, South Carolina, United States
- Height: 1.82 m (6 ft 0 in)
- Position: Right-back

Youth career
- 2005–2010: HFC Haarlem
- 2010–2011: RKSV Pancratius
- 2011–2012: Zeeburgia
- 2012–2015: FC Groningen

Senior career*
Years	Team	Apps	(Gls)
2015–2017	FC Groningen	17	(1)
2016–2017	Jong FC Groningen	9	(0)
2017–2019	Excelsior	4	(0)
2019–2021	FC Emmen	4	(0)
2021–2025	Koninklijke HFC	27	(0)
Total		61	(1)

International career^{‡}
2015	United States U20	5	(0)
2016	United States U23	1	(0)
- * Club domestic league appearances and goals as of April 6, 2024 ‡ National team caps and goals as of March 26, 2016

Desevio Ilan Payne (born November 30, 1995) is an American professional soccer player who plays as a right-back.

== Early and personal life ==
Payne was born in Greenwood, South Carolina, where his Trinidadian father met his Dutch mother at Lander University. His parents moved to the Netherlands when he was one year old, where he grew up. He is the older brother of the soccer player Déron Payne.

== Career ==
Payne made his professional debut on February 22, 2015, in the Eredivisie against Heerenveen.

== International career ==
Payne is eligible to represent the United States, Trinidad and Tobago and the Netherlands. Payne represented the United States at the 2015 FIFA U-20 World Cup.

== Honours ==
FC Groningen

- KNVB Cup: 2014–15
