= 2024–25 Willem II season =

129th Willem II season

Willem II
2024–25 season
- Chairman: Jan van der Laak
- Manager: Kristof Aelbrecht (from 30 April); Peter Maes (until 30 April)
- Stadium: Koning Willem II Stadion
- Eredivisie: 16th (relegated)
- KNVB Cup: Second round
- Top goalscorer: League: Jesse Bosch (5); All: Kyan Vaesen (6)
- Average home league attendance: 13,158
- Biggest win: 4-1 v. NEC
- Biggest defeat: 6-2 at Twente
Home colours	Away colours

The 2024–25 season was Willem II's 129th season in existence and marked a return to the Eredivisie after relegation to the Eerste Divisie following the 2023–24. They also competed in the KNVB Cup.

== Season summary ==
=== Pre-season ===
The off-Season personnel changes began shortly before the 2023–24 season ended, with the appointment of Merijn Goris as the new general manager of the club, taking over for Martin van Geel who announced in February 2024 that he would be leaving the position on 1 July 2024.

On 14 May Tom Caluwé was announced as the new technical director of the club, replacing Van Geel who was acting in the role following the resignation of Teun Jacobs in September 2023. Shortly after the Caluwé appointment, the team took care of its first offseason priority by signing Peter Maes, the trainer who led the team back into the Eredivisie, to a new contract that runs through the summer of 2026. The team further addressed to its technical staff by hiring Kristof Aelbrecht as assistant-trainer and Stefan Winters as performance coach. Aelbrecht replacing Peter van den Berg, who departed to become the head trainer of the Netherlands under-17 national team, and Winters replacing departing performance coach, Nils Thörner. Goalkeeper coach, Peter den Otter remained with the club, extending his contract by two years. The technical staff changes were completed with the hiring of Hessel Verhoven as video analyst for the club, replacing Rick Mennes who departed the club after seven years for a similar position with Feyenoord.

On the player side of the club, the departure of four players: Max Svensson, Matthias Verreth, Freek Heerkens, and Michael de Leeuw was announced, with Heerkens retiring and the other three moving on to new clubs. In late June, the club signed their first new player to the squad, acquiring Thomas Didillon-Hödl to a two-year contract. Four more players (Mickaël Tırpan, Cisse Sandra, Emilio Kehrer, and Kyan Vaesen) were later added from other Belgian clubs.

=== Start of season ===
Willem II kicked off the season on 10 August 2024 with a 1–1 draw against 2023–24 KNVB Cup winners Feyenoord at De Kuip, followed by the first win of their return to the Eredivisie, 2–0 at home over Go Ahead Eagles.

As the primary transfer window was running down, the club added a few more desired pieces in preparation for the Eredivisie competition: attacking midfielder Amar Fatah and defenders Boris Lambert and Miodrag Pivaš. They closed out the period by sending midfielder Max de Waal to VVV Venlo on loan.

=== Season run-in ===
Following the Winter break, Willem II went on a deep slide, earning just 2 points in the first 12 matches of 2025. This led first to the departure of Technical Director Tom Caluwé, who left Willem II April 18 to return to his former club KV Mechelen in Belgium. Less than two weeks later, on April 30, head trainer Peter Maes and the team agreed to part ways following an eighth consecutive loss. Assistant trainer Kristof Aelbrecht was named the interim head trainer, and former player, Freek Heerkens, was appointed acting Technical Director.

== Players ==
=== First-team squad ===
As of 30 April 2025

Note: Flags indicate national team as defined under FIFA eligibility rules; some limited exceptions apply. Players may hold more than one non-FIFA nationality.

No.	Pos.	Nation	Player
1	GK	FRA	Thomas Didillon-Hödl
24	GK	NED	Connor van den Berg
41	GK	NED	Maarten Schut
4	DF	NED	Erik Schouten (2nd captain)
5	DF	ISL	Rúnar Þór Sigurgeirsson
6	DF	BEL	Boris Lambert
15	DF	SRB	Miodrag Pivaš (On loan from Newcastle)
22	DF	BEL	Rob Nizet
25	DF	BEL	Mickaël Tırpan
30	DF	AUT	Raffael Behounek
33	DF	NED	Tommy St. Jago
44	DF	NED	Niels van Berkel
48	DF	NED	Jens Mathijsen

No.	Pos.	Nation	Player
8	MF	NED	Jesse Bosch (Captain)
14	MF	BEL	Cisse Sandra (On loan from Club Brugge)
16	MF	NED	Ringo Meerveld
27	MF	NED	Dani Mathieu
34	MF	NED	Amine Lachkar
50	MF	NED	Per van Loon
77	MF	TUR	Dennis Kaygin
7	FW	NED	Nick Doodeman
9	FW	BEL	Kyan Vaesen (On loan from Westerlo)
11	FW	GER	Emilio Kehrer
17	FW	NED	Patrick Joosten
18	FW	COD	Jeremy Bokila
19	FW	BEL	Youssuf Sylla
21	FW	SWE	Amar Fatah (On loan from Troyes)

== Transfers ==
=== In ===
Date	Position	No.	Player	From club	Notes	Ref.
26 June 2024	GK	1	(France) Thomas Didillon-Hödl	(Belgium) Cercle Brugge	Free Transfer	
26 June 2024	DF	25	(Belgium) Mickaël Tırpan	(Belgium) Lierse	Free Transfer	
4 July 2024	MF	8	(Belgium) Cisse Sandra	(Belgium) Club Brugge	Loan	
5 July 2024	FW	11	(Germany) Emilio Kehrer	(Belgium) Cercle Brugge	Free Transfer	
25 July 2024	FW	9	(Belgium) Kyan Vaesen	(Belgium) Westerlo	Loan	
20 August 2024	DF	48	(Netherlands) Jens Mathijsen	(Netherlands) Willem II U18	Free Transfer	
26 August 2024	MF	21	(Sweden) Amar Fatah	(France) ES Troyes AC	Loan	
29 August 2024	MF	6	(Belgium) Boris Lambert	(Belgium) K.A.S. Eupen	Free Transfer	
2 September 2024	DF	15	(Belgium) Miodrag Pivaš	(Belgium) Newcastle United F.C.	Loan	
4 January 2025	FW	19	(Belgium) Youssuf Sylla	(Belgium) Royal Charleroi S.C.	Loan	
16 January 2024	MF	15	(Turkey) Dennis Kaygin	(Belgium) SK Rapid Wien	Loan	

=== Out ===
Date	Position	No.	Player	To club	Notes	Ref.
31 May 2024	FW	11	(Sweden) Max Svensson	(Sweden) Kalmar FF	Free Transfer	
31 May 2024	MF	6	(Belgium) Matthias Verreth	(Italy) Brescia	Free Transfer	
31 May 2024	FW	3	(Netherlands) Freek Heerkens	N/A	Retired	
31 May 2024	FW	23	(Netherlands) Michael de Leeuw	(Netherlands) SC Cambuur	Free Transfer	
1 July 2024	FW	23	(Netherlands) Thijs Oosting	(Netherlands) FC Groningen	Transfer	
2 July 2024	FW	23	(Netherlands) Jeredy Hilterman	(Netherlands) Arminia Bielefeld	Loan ended	
20 August 2024	GK	21	(Netherlands) Joshua Smits	(Netherlands) De Graafschap	Transfer	
2 September 2024	MF	10	(Netherlands) Max de Waal	(Netherlands) VVV-Venlo	Loan	
7 December 2024	DF	20	(Netherlands) Valentino Vermeulen	No club yet	Contract terminated	
4 February 2025	FW	35	(Netherlands) Khaled Razak	(Netherlands) Roda JC	Loan	

== Pre-season and friendlies ==
Win Draw Loss Void Fixtures

6 July 2023 Friendly	RKDSV Diessen	0-6	Willem II	Diessen
14:30 CEST (UTC+2)			Doodeman 7'; Unknown 43' (own); Sandra 47', 66', 71'; Mika de Jonge 90'	Stadium: Sportpark De Alsie

9 July 2024 Friendly	Willem II	Cancelled	Quick Boys	Oisterwijk
19:00 CEST (UTC+2)				Stadium: Sportpark Den Donk

13 July 2024 Friendly	FC Dordrecht	4-4	Willem II	Dordrecht
15:30 CEST (UTC+2)	Van Vianen 88'; Van der Sluijs 90', 105', 107'		St. Jago 33'; De Waal 59'; Kehrer 111', 116'	Stadium: Stadion Krommedijk

20 July 2024 Friendly	Willem II	5-0	Lommel S.K.	Loon op Zand
14:30 CEST (UTC+2)	Doodeman 2'; Titi 47' (own); Meerveld 61'; Van Loon 80'; Joosten 90'			Stadium: Sportpark De Klokkenberg

27 July 2024 Friendly	Willem II	2-4	Sparta Rotterdam	Loon op Zand
13:00 CEST (UTC+2)	Kehrer 11'; Sandra 70'		Clement 7', 38'; Lauritsen 24'; Van der Kust 40'	Stadium: Sportpark De Klokkenberg

3 August 2024 Friendly	Bristol City	0-0	Willem II	Bristol
15:00 CEST (UTC+2)				Stadium: Ashton Gate

== Competitions ==
=== Overall record ===
Competition	First match	Last match	Starting round	Final position	Record							
Competition	First match	Last match	Starting round	Final position	Pld	W	D	L	GF	GA	GD	Win %
Eredivisie	10 August 2024	18 May 2025	Matchday 1	16	34	6	8	20	34	56	−22	17.65
KNVB Cup	30 Oct 2024	19 Dec 2024	First round	Second round	2	1	0	1	4	4	+0	50.00
Total					36	7	8	21	38	60	−22	19.44

Last updated: 30 April 2025
Source: Soccerway

=== Eredivisie ===
==== League table ====
Pos	Team	Pld	W	D	L	GF	GA	GD	Pts	Qualification or relegation
14	Heracles Almelo	34	9	11	14	42	63	−21	38	
15	NAC Breda	34	8	9	17	34	58	−24	33	
16	Willem II (R)	34	6	8	20	34	56	−22	26	Qualification for the Relegation play-off
17	RKC Waalwijk (R)	34	6	7	21	44	74	−30	25	Relegation to Eerste Divisie
18	Almere City (R)	34	4	10	20	23	64	−41	22	Relegation to Eerste Divisie

Source: Eredivisie
Rules for classification: 1) Points; 2) Goal difference; 3) Goals scored; 4) Head-to-head points; 5) Head-to-head goal difference; 6) Head-to-head away goals scored; 7) Play-off if relevant for deciding champion, relegation or participating in a European league, otherwise by draw. 8) Penalty shoot-out (only after a play-off)
(R) Relegated

==== Results summary ====
Overall								Home						Away					
Pld	W	D	L	GF	GA	GD	Pts	W	D	L	GF	GA	GD	W	D	L	GF	GA	GD
30	6	6	18	30	50	−20	24	3	3	9	18	23	−5	3	3	9	12	27	−15

Last updated: 30 April 2025.
Source: Eredivisie

==== Results by round ====
Round	1	2	3	4	5	6	7	8	9	10	11	12	13	14	15	16	17	18	19	20	21	22	23	24	25	26	27	28	29	30	31	32	33	34
Ground	A	H	A	H	H	A	H	A	H	A	H	A	H	A	H	A	H	A	H	A	H	A	H	A	H	A	H	A	H	A	A	H	H	A
Result	D	W	D	L	W	L	L	W	D	L	L	W	D	L	L	W	W	L	D	L	L	D	L	L	L	L	L	L	L	L				
Position	9	6	9	11	6	9	11	8	8	10	11	9	10	11	12	11	9	10	12	12	13	12	14	15	16	16	16	16	16	16				

Updated to match(es) played on 30 April 2025. Source: Eredivisie
A = Away; H = Home; W = Win; D = Draw; L = Loss

==== Matches ====
The initial slate of league fixtures were unveiled on 19 June 2024. Matches through matchday 21 as well as the final two matchdays are definitively scheduled (though some dates have been rescheduled from the initial release), while the remaining matches are tentatively scheduled and will be given exact dates and times later in the season.

10 August 2024 1	Feyenoord	1-1	Willem II	Rotterdam
16:30 CEST (UTC+2)	Milambo 12'; Nieuwkoop (yellow card) 72'; Wellenreuther (yellow card) 83'	Report	Lachkar (yellow card) 50'; Vaesen (yellow card) 53', (goal) 83'; Mathijsen (yellow card) 90'; Vermeulen (yellow card) 90+4'	Stadium: De Kuip; Attendance: 47500; Referee: Dennis Johan Higler

18 August 2024 2	Willem II	2-0	Go Ahead Eagles	Tilburg
14:30 CEST (UTC+2)	Vaesen 21' (Penalty); Meerveld 28'; Sigurgeirsson (yellow card) 71'; Sandra (yellow card) 82'	Report	Amofa (yellow card) 63'; Llansana (yellow card) 72'	Stadium: Koning Willem II Stadion; Attendance: 13,000; Referee: Ingmar Oostrom

25 August 2024 3	Heracles Almelo	1-1	Willem II	Almelo
14:30 CEST (UTC+2)	Talvitie 33'; Roosken (yellow card) 57'; Engels (yellow card) 71'	Report	Bosch 37', (yellow card) 62'; Sigurgeirsson (yellow card) 74'; Lachkar (yellow card) 82'	Stadium: Erve Asito; Attendance: 11,286; Referee: Edwin van de Graaf

31 August 2024 4	Willem II	1-2	Sparta Rotterdam	Tilburg
21:00 CEST (UTC+2)	Bosch (yellow card) 27'; Sandra 84'	Report	Clement 48'; Reith (yellow card) 55'; Van der Kust (yellow card) 69'; Kitolano (yellow card) 77'; Neghli 89'; Meissen (yellow card) 90+6'	Stadium: Koning Willem II Stadion; Attendance: 10,600; Referee: Allard Lindhout

15 September 2024 5	Willem II	3-0	RKC Waalwijk	Tilburg
14:30 CEST (UTC+2)	Vaesen 8' (penalty); Meerveld 30'; Van Eijma 53' (own); Behounek (yellow card) 55'	Report	Van Gelderen (yellow card) 81'	Stadium: Koning Willem II Stadion; Attendance: 13,000; Referee: Bas Nijhuis

21 September 2024 6	FC Utrecht	3-2	Willem II	Utrecht
16:30 CEST (UTC+2)	Behounek 11' (own); Ohio 37' (penalty); El Karouani (yellow card) 45+2'; Sigurgeirsson 53' (own); Aaronson (yellow card) 90+3'	Report	Sandra 29', 43'; Maes (yellow card) 42' (yellow-red card) 42'; Bosch (yellow card) 45+2'; Meerveld (yellow card) 87'; Fatah (yellow card) 90+5'	Stadium: Stadion Galgenwaard; Attendance: 20,861; Referee: Joey Kooij

28 September 2024 7	Willem II	0-2	PSV	Tilburg
16:30 CEST (UTC+2)	Sigurgeirsson (yellow card) 35'	Report	Dams (yellow card) 27'; Pepi 49', 64'; Perišić (yellow card) 59'	Stadium: Koning Willem II Stadion; Attendance: 13,256; Referee: Serdar Gözübüyük

4 October 2024 8	Almere City	0-1	Willem II	Almere City
20:00 CEST (UTC+2)	Zagaritis (yellow card) 90+5'	Report	Tırpan (yellow card) 52'; Lachkar (yellow card) 56'; Fatah 78'; FatLambertah (yellow card) 85'	Stadium: Yanmar Stadion; Attendance: 3,368; Referee: Jannick van der Laan

20 October 2024 9	Willem II	0-0	Fortuna Sittard	Tilburg
12:15 CEST (UTC+2)	Didillon-Hödl (yellow card) 37'	Report	Guth (yellow card) 29'	Stadium: Koning Willem II Stadion; Attendance: 12,084; Referee: Rob Dieperink

27 October 2024 10	Ajax	1-0	Willem II	Amsterdam
16:45 CET (UTC+1)	Klaassen 6' (penalty); Gaaei (yellow card) 54'	Report		Stadium: Johan Cruyff Arena; Attendance: 53,359; Referee: Bas Nijhuis

2 November 2024 11	Willem II	0-1	FC Twente	Tilburg
18:45 CET (UTC+1)	Fatah (yellow card) 32'; Sigurgeirsson (yellow card) 48'; Lambert (yellow card) 83'; Bokila (yellow card) 90'	Report	Rots (yellow card) 51'; Lammers 56'	Stadium: Koning Willem II Stadion; Attendance: 12,775; Referee: Ingmar Oostrom

10 November 2024 12	AZ Alkmaar	1-2	Willem II	Alkmaar
16:45 CET (UTC+1)	Meerdink 63'	Report	Lambert (yellow card) 19'; Vaesen 37'; Sandra 41'; Didillon-Hödl (yellow card) 59'; Behounek (yellow card) 90+7'	Stadium: AFAS Stadion; Referee: Joey Kooij

24 November 2024 13	Willem II	2-2	NAC Breda	Tilburg
14:30 CET (UTC+1)	Bosch 61'; Vaesen (yellow card) 62'; Tırpan (yellow card) 66'; Bokila (yellow card) 89' (goal) 90+8' (penalty); Nizet (yellow card) 90+9'	Report	Sauer 31'; Greiml 53'; Van den Bergh (yellow card) 90+1'; Leemans (yellow card) 90+9'	Stadium: Koning Willem II Stadion; Attendance: 13,775; Referee: Allard Lindhout

30 November 2024 14	FC Groningen	2-0	Willem II	Groningen
18:45 CET (UTC+1)	Oosting 32'; Van Bergen (yellow card) 55'; Resink 59'	Report		Stadium: Euroborg; Attendance: 22,136; Referee: Marc Nagtegaal

8 December 2024 15	Willem II	1-2	SC Heerenveen	Tilburg
16:45 CET (UTC+1)	Bosch (yellow card) 24'; Behounek (yellow card) 45+3'; Van der Hart 89' (own)		Smans (yellow card) 53'; Hall (yellow card) 64'; Nicolaescu 85'; Brouwers 90+3'	Stadium: Koning Willem II Stadion; Attendance: 12,775

13 December 2024 16	PEC Zwolle	0-1	Willem II	Zwolle
20:00 CET (UTC+1)		Report	Meerveld 11'; St. Jago (yellow card) 63'; Bokila (yellow card) 71'; Behounek (yellow card) 74'	Stadium: MAC³PARK Stadion; Attendance: 13,789; Referee: Joey Kooij

22 December 2024 17	Willem II	4-1	NEC	Tilburg
16:45 CET (UTC+1)	Márquez 20' (own); Bokila 33'; Meerveld 63'; Lambert 86'	Report	Márquez (yellow card) 58'; Ogawa 24' (yellow card) 61'	Stadium: Koning Willem II Stadion; Attendance: 12,575; Referee: Richard Wilhelmus Martens

12 January 2025 18	FC Twente	6-2	Willem II	Twente
12:15 CET (UTC+1)	Steijn 12' 36' 50' (penalty); Van Wolfswinkel 68'; Sadílek 79'; Eiting 90+1'	Report	Behounek 31'; Joosten 40'; Bokila (yellow card) 71'	Stadium: De Grolsch Veste; Attendance: 29,500; Referee: Jeroen Manschot

18 January 2025 19	Willem II	1-1	Feyenoord	Tilburg
20:00 CET (UTC+1)	St. Jago (yellow card) 40'; Bosch 76'	Report	Paixão 45+2'	Stadium: Koning Willem II Stadion; Attendance: 13,775; Referee: Danny Makkelie

26 January 2025 20	RKC Waalwijk	2-0	Willem II	Waalwijk
14:30 CET (UTC+1)	Ihattaren (yellow card) 36'; Van de Loo 46'; Familia-Castillo (yellow card) 57'; Oukili (yellow card) 68'	Report	St. Jago (yellow card) 1' (goal) 22' (own); Bosch (yellow card) 37'; Tırpan (yellow card) 73'	Stadium: Mandemakers Stadion; Attendance: 6,639; Referee: Jeroen Manschot

2 February 2025 21	Willem II	0-2	AZ Alkmaar	Tilburg
20:00 CET (UTC+1)	Fatah (yellow card) 27'; Lambert (yellow card) 30'; Bokila (yellow card) 84' (yellow-red card) 90+2'	Report	Parrott 28' (penalty); Mijnans 42'	Stadium: Koning Willem II Stadion; Attendance: 11,650; Referee: Marc Nagtegaal

8 February 2025 22	PSV	1-1	Willem II	Eindhoven
TBD CET (UTC+1)	Lang 62'	Report	Tırpan (yellow card) 53' (goal) 83'; Schouten (yellow card) 90+1'	Stadium: Philips Stadion; Attendance: 34,200; Referee: Allard Lindhout

15 February 2025 23	Willem II	1-3	FC Groningen	Tilburg
21:00 CET (UTC+1)	Lambert (yellow card) 45'; Bosch 49'	Report	Kwakman 5'; Resnik 17'; De Jonge 21'	Stadium: Koning Willem II Stadion; Attendance: 13,800; Referee: Bas Nijhuis

2 March 2025 24	Sparta Rotterdam	4-0	Willem II	Rotterdam
16:45 CET (UTC+1)	Lauritsen 20' 68'; Van Bergen 63'; Bakari (yellow card) 64'; Hlynsson 90'	Report	Meerveld (yellow card) 45+1'; Bosch (yellow card) 80'	Stadium: Het Kasteel; Attendance: 10,031; Referee: Danny Makkelie

9 March 2025 25	Willem II	2-3	FC Utrecht	Tilburg
12:15 CET (UTC+1)	Lambert 17'; Sigurgeirsson 83'	Report	Haller 67'; Blake 75' (yellow card) 86'; Ohio 85' (yellow card) 87'	Stadium: Koning Willem II Stadion; Referee: Allard Lindhout

16 March 2025 26	Go Ahead Eagles	1-0	Willem II	Deventer
12:15 CET (UTC+1)	Linthorst (yellow card) 52'; Smit 83'	Report	Bokila 90+1'; Sigurgeirsson 90+6'	Stadium: De Adelaarshorst; Attendance: 9,997; Referee: Robin Hensgens

29 March 2025 27	Willem II	0-2	Almere City FC	Tilburg
18:45 CET (UTC+1)	Vaesen (red card) 32'; Sylla (yellow card) 40'; Schouten (yellow card) 52'	Report	Brym 12'; Blake (yellow card) 35'; Martins 49' (yellow card) 84'	Stadium: Koning Willem II Stadion; Attendance: 13,875; Referee: Sander van der Eijk

4 April 2025 28	SC Heerenveen	3-1	Willem II	Heerenveen
20:00 CEST (UTC+2)	Nicolăescu 11'; Kersten 32'; Sebaoui 66'	Report	Bosch 75'; Behounek (yellow card) 88'	Stadium: Abe Lenstra Stadion; Attendance: 23,865; Referee: Martin van den Kerkhof

13 April 2025 29	Willem II	1-2	Ajax	Tilburg
16:45 CEST (UTC+2)	Mathijsen (yellow card) 8'; Kehrer 41'	Report	Edvardsen 74'; Weghorst 78'	Stadium: Koning Willem II Stadion; Attendance: 14,000; Referee: Marc Nagtegal

27 April 2025 30	Fortuna Sittard	1-0	Willem II	Sittard
12:15 CEST (UTC+2)	Bullaude 62'	Report		Stadium: Fortuna Sittard Stadion; Referee: Serdar Gözübüyük

3 May 2025 31	NEC	1–1	Willem II	Nijmegen
16:30 CEST (UTC+2)	Shiogai 83'	Report	Verdonk 1' (o.g.); Behounek (red card) 90+7'	Stadium: Goffertstadion; Attendance: 12,650; Referee: Danny Makkelie

9 May 2025 32	Willem II	1–2	Heracles Almelo	Tilburg
20:00 CEST (UTC+2)	Bokila 51'	Report	Mesik 16'; Hornkamp 66' (pen.)	Stadium: Koning Willem II Stadion; Attendance: 14,500; Referee: Jeroen Manschot

14 May 2025 33	Willem II	1–2	PEC Zwolle	Tilburg
20:00 CEST (UTC+2)	Bosch 72'	Report	Namli 26'; Reijnders 79'	Stadium: Koning Willem II Stadion; Attendance: 14,000; Referee: Serdar Gözübüyük

18 May 2025 34	NAC Breda	1–1	Willem II	Breda
14:30 CEST (UTC+2)	Ómarsson 24'	Report	Behounek 45'	Stadium: Rat Verlegh Stadion; Attendance: 18,712; Referee: Sander Van Der Eijk

=== KNVB Cup ===
30 October 2024 First round	SC Genemuiden	2-3 (a.e.t.)	Willem II	Genemuiden
21:00 CET (UTC+1)	Van de Wetering 20'; Etten 24' (yellow card) 52'; Van Bentham (yellow card) 51'; Breman (yellow card) 56'; Tuinman (yellow card) 57'; Beimers (yellow card) 90'; Drost (yellow card) 118'	Report	Sandra (yellow card) 44'; Bokila (yellow card) 44'; Vaesen 67' (penalty), 95'; Tırpan (yellow card) 90'; Lambert (yellow card) 92'; Behounek 90+6' (yellow card) 119'; Van den Berg (yellow card) 114'	Stadium: Sportpark de Wetering; Referee: Martijn Vos

19 December 2024 Second round	VV Noordwijk	2-1	Willem II	Noordwijk
18:45 CET (UTC+1)	Wendt 2'; Roep 56'; Tijn-Asjoe (yellow card) 90'	Report	Bokila 63'; Lachkar (yellow card) 88'	Stadium: Sportpark Duinwetering; Attendance: 1,150; Referee: Martin van den Kerkhof

== Statistics ==
=== Overall ===
Appearances numbers are for appearances in competitive games only, including sub appearances.
Red card numbers denote: numbers in parentheses represent red cards overturned for wrongful dismissal.
Source for all stats:

No.	Player	Pos.	Eredivisie				KNVB Cup				Total			
No.	Player	Pos.	👕	Goal	Yellow card	Red card	👕	Goal	Yellow card	Red card	👕	Goal	Yellow card	Red card
1	(France) Thomas Didillon-Hödl	GK	22		2						22		2	
4	(Netherlands) Erik Schouten	MF	14		2						14		2	
5	(Iceland) Rúnar Sigurgeirsson	DF	26	1	5		1				27	1	6	
6	(Belgium) Boris Lambert	DF	22	2	5		2		1		24	2	6	
7	(Netherlands) Nick Doodeman	FW	23				2				25		2	
8	(Belgium) Jesse Bosch	MF	29	5	6		1				30	5	6	
9	(Belgium) Kyan Vaesen	FW	23	4	2	1	1	2			24	6	2	1
10	(Netherlands) Max de Waal	MF												
11	(Germany) Emilio Kehrer	FW	19	1	1		2				21	1	1	
14	(Netherlands) Cisse Sandra	FW	26	4	1		1		1		27	4	2	
15	(Serbia) Miodrag Pivaš	DF	4				2				6			
16	(Netherlands) Ringo Meerveld	MF	29	4	2		2				31	4	2	
17	(Netherlands) Patrick Joosten	DF	16	1			2				18	1		
18	(Democratic Republic of the Congo) Jeremy Bokila	FW	27	2	6	1	2	1	1		29	3	7	1
19	(Belgium) Youssuf Sylla	MF	10		1						1		1	
20	(Netherlands) Valentino Vermeulen	DF	3		1		1				4		1	
21	(Sweden) Amar Fatah	FW	20	1	3		1				21	1	4	
21	(Netherlands) Joshua Smits	GK												
22	(Belgium) Rob Nizet	DF	17		1		1				18		1	
24	(Netherlands) Connor van den Berg	GK					2		1		2		1	
25	(Belgium) Mickaël Tırpan	DF	23	1	4		1		1		24	1	5	
27	(Netherlands) Dani Mathieu	MF												
30	(Austria) Raffael Behounek	DF	29	1	5		2	1	1		31	2	6	
33	(Netherlands) Tommy St. Jago	DF	29		3		2				31		3	
34	(Netherlands) Amine Lachkar	MF	20		3		1		1		21		4	
35	(Netherlands) Khaled Razak	FW	1				1				2			
41	(Netherlands) Maarten Schut	GK												
44	(Netherlands) Niels van Berkel	DF												
48	(Netherlands) Jens Mathijsen	DF	4		2						4		2	
77	(Turkey) Dennis Kaygin	MF	6								6			
Own goals				4								4		
Totals				26	55	2		4	7	0		30	62	2

=== Scoring ===
Rank	No.	Player	Pos	Eredivisie		KNVB Cup		Total	
Rank	No.	Player	Pos	Goals	Assists	Goals	Assists	Goals	Assists
1	9	(Belgium) Kyan Vaesen	FW	4	2	2		6	2
2	16	(Netherlands) Ringo Meerveld	MF	4	2		1	4	3
3	8	(Belgium) Jesse Bosch	MF	5				5	
3	14	(Netherlands) Cisse Sandra	FW	4	2			4	2
4	18	(Democratic Republic of the Congo) Jeremy Bokila	FW	2		1	1	3	1
5	30	(Austria) Raffael Behounek	DF	1	1	1		2	1
6	6	(Belgium) Boris Lambert	MF	2				2	
6	11	(Germany) Emilio Kehrer	FW	1	2			1	2
6	17	(Netherlands) Patrick Joosten	DF	1	1		1	1	2
6	25	(Belgium) Mickaël Tırpan	DF	1	2			1	2
7	5	(Iceland) Rúnar Sigurgeirsson	DF	1	1			1	1
7	7	(Netherlands) Nick Doodeman	FW		3				3
8	21	(Sweden) Amar Fatah	FW	1				1	
9	77	(Turkey) Dennis Kaygin	MF		1				1
10	4	(Netherlands) Erik Schouten	MF						
10	10	(Netherlands) Max de Waal	MF						
10	15	(Serbia) Miodrag Pivaš	DF						
10	20	(Netherlands) Valentino Vermeulen	DF						
10	22	(Belgium) Rob Nizet	DF						
10	27	(Netherlands) Dani Mathieu	MF						
10	33	(Netherlands) Tommy St. Jago	DF						
10	34	(Netherlands) Amine Lachkar	MF						
10	35	(Netherlands) Khaled Razak	FW						
10	44	(Netherlands) Niels van Berkel	DF						
10	48	(Netherlands) Jens Mathijsen	DF						
10	1	(France) Thomas Didillon-Hödl	GK						
10	21	(Netherlands) Joshua Smits	GK						
10	24	(Netherlands) Connor van den Berg	GK						
10	41	(Netherlands) Maarten Schut	GK						
Totals				26	18	4	3	30	21

=== Disciplinary record ===
Rank	No.	Player	Pos	Eredivisie			KNVB Cup			Total		
Rank	No.	Player	Pos	Yellow card	(yellow card) (yellow-red card)	Red card	Yellow card	(yellow card) (yellow-red card)	Red card	Yellow card	(yellow card) (yellow-red card)	Red card
1	18	(Democratic Republic of the Congo) Jeremy Bokila	FW	6	1		1			7	1	
2	8	(Belgium) Jesse Bosch	MF	6						6		
2	30	(Austria) Raffael Behounek	DF	5			1			6		
2	6	(Belgium) Boris Lambert	MF	5			1			6		
3	5	(Iceland) Rúnar Sigurgeirsson	DF	5						5		
3	25	(Belgium) Mickaël Tırpan	DF	4			1			5		
4	34	(Netherlands) Amine Lachkar	MF	3			1			4		
5	9	(Belgium) Kyan Vaesen	FW	2		1				2		1
5	21	(Sweden) Amar Fatah	FW	3						3		
5	33	(Netherlands) Tommy St. Jago	DF	3						3		
6	1	(France) Thomas Didillon-Hödl	GK	2						2		
6	4	(Netherlands) Erik Schouten	MF	2						2		
6	14	(Netherlands) Cisse Sandra	MF	1			1			2		
6	16	(Netherlands) Ringo Meerveld	MF	2						2		
6	48	(Netherlands) Jens Mathijsen	DF	2						2		
7	11	(Germany) Emilio Kehrer	FW	1						1		
7	19	(Belgium) Youssuf Sylla	FW	1						1		
7	20	(Netherlands) Valentino Vermeulen	DF	1						1		
7	22	(Belgium) Rob Nizet	DF	1						1		
7	24	(Netherlands) Connor van den Berg	GK				1			1		
8	7	(Netherlands) Nick Doodeman	FW									
8	10	(Netherlands) Max de Waal	MF									
8	15	(Serbia) Miodrag Pivaš	DF									
8	17	(Netherlands) Patrick Joosten	DF									
8	27	(Netherlands) Dani Mathieu	MF									
8	35	(Netherlands) Khaled Razak	FW									
8	44	(Netherlands) Niels van Berkel	DF									
8	21	(Netherlands) Joshua Smits	GK									
8	41	(Netherlands) Maarten Schut	GK									
Totals				55	1	1	7	0	0	62	1	1

=== Clean sheets ===
The list is sorted by shirt number when total clean sheets are equal. Numbers in parentheses represent games where both goalkeepers participated and both kept a clean sheet; the number in parentheses is awarded to the goalkeeper who was substituted on, whilst a full clean sheet is awarded to the goalkeeper who was on the field at the start of play.

Goalkeepers					Clean sheets		
Rank	No.	Player	Apps	Goals conceded	Eredivisie	KNVB Cup	Total
1	1	(France) Thomas Didillon-Hödl	30	47	5	0	5
2	24	(Netherlands) Connor van den Berg	2	4	0	0	0
3	21	(Netherlands) Joshua Smits	0	0	0	0	0
3	41	(Netherlands) Maarten Schut	0	0	0	0	0
Totals			32	51	5	0	5

== Awards ==
=== Eredivisie Player of the Month ===
Awarded based on Opta statistics and votes from football fans.

Month	Player	Ref.
October	(France) Thomas Didillon-Hödl	
