= 2023–24 Willem II season =

Willem II
2023–24 season
- Manager: Peter Maes (from 16 September); Reinier Robbemond (until 5 September)
- Stadium: Koning Willem II Stadion
- Eerste Divisie: 1st
- KNVB Cup: Second round
- Top goalscorer: League: Jeredy Hilterman (16); All: Jeredy Hilterman (17)
- Highest home attendance: 13,888 (16 February 2024 v. ADO Den Haag
- Lowest home attendance: 10,594 (15 October 2023 v. FC Den Bosch
- Average home league attendance: 12,437
- Biggest win: 0-5 (12 January 2024 at TOP Oss)
- Biggest defeat: 1-4 (3 September 2023 v. Roda JC)
colours	colours	colours
- All statistics correct as of 10 May 2024.

The 2023–24 season is Willem II's 128th season in existence and second consecutive in the Eerste Divisie. They also competed in the KNVB Cup.

After a slow start to the season which saw the club fall to 15th position in the Eerste Divisie, with only one win in four games, culminating in a 4–1 loss to arch-rival NAC Breda, manager Reinier Robbemond was fired by the club on 5 September 2023.

On 16 September 2023, the club introduced Peter Maes as their new head coach, succeeding Robbemond. The appointment of Maes marked the club's first-ever Belgian head coach and his first coaching venture outside of Belgium. Under Maes' guidance, the team secured victories in their initial six matches and on Matchday 14, following a 2-1 home victory over Jong FC Utrecht, Willem II took over the 1st position in the Eerste Divisie.

The run of good play continued under Maes and on Matchday 37 late substitute Michael de Leeuw scored in the 93rd minute to earn a 1-1 draw on the road against FC Dordrecht. The draw earned Willem II enough points on the season to secure promotion back to the Eredivisie for the 2024-25 season. To finish off the season, on the final match day, Willem II came back from a 0-2 deficit to win 3-2 on a stoppage-time goal by midfielder Ringo Meerveld to secure the Eerste Divisie championship.

== Players ==
=== First-team squad ===
As of 21 December 2023

Note: Flags indicate national team as defined under FIFA eligibility rules; some limited exceptions apply. Players may hold more than one non-FIFA nationality.

No.	Pos.	Nation	Player
21	GK	NED	Joshua Smits
24	GK	NED	Connor van den Berg
41	GK	NED	Maarten Schut
3	DF	NED	Freek Heerkens (captain)
4	DF	NED	Erik Schouten (2nd captain)
5	DF	ISL	Rúnar Þór Sigurgeirsson
20	DF	NED	Valentino Vermeulen
30	DF	AUT	Raffael Behounek
33	DF	NED	Tommy St. Jago
34	DF	NED	Amine Lachkar
44	DF	NED	Niels van Berkel
22	DF	NED	Rob Nizet

No.	Pos.	Nation	Player
6	MF	BEL	Matthias Verreth
10	MF	NED	Max de Waal
16	MF	NED	Ringo Meerveld
27	MF	NED	Dani Mathieu
29	MF	NED	Thijs Oosting
32	MF	NED	Jesse Bosch
7	FW	NED	Nick Doodeman
9	FW	SUR	Jeredy Hilterman (on loan from Almere City)
11	FW	SWE	Max Svensson
17	FW	NED	Patrick Joosten
18	FW	COD	Jeremy Bokila
23	FW	NED	Michael de Leeuw
35	FW	NED	Khaled Razak

== Transfers ==
=== In ===
Date	Position	No.	Player	From club	Notes	Ref.
12 July 2023	MF	10	(Netherlands) Max de Waal	(Netherlands) Ajax U21	Free Transfer	
28 July 2023	DF	30	(Austria) Raffael Behounek	(Austria) WSG Tirol	Transfer	
31 July 2023	FW	17	(Netherlands) Patrick Joosten	(Cyprus) Apollon Limassol FC	Free Transfer	
24 August 2023	FW	9	(Netherlands) Jeredy Hilterman	(Netherlands) Almere City FC	Loan	
28 August 2023	DF	5	(Iceland) Rúnar Thór Sigurgeirsson	(Sweden) Östers IF	Transfer	
1 September 2023	DF	33	(Netherlands) Tommy St. Jago	(Netherlands) FC Utrecht	Free Transfer	
24 October 2023	GK	41	(Netherlands) Maarten Schut	(Netherlands) Willem II youth team	Transfer	
24 October 2023	FW	35	(Netherlands) Khaled Razak	(Netherlands) Willem II youth team	Transfer	
20 January 2024	DF	22	(Belgium) Rob Nizet	(Belgium) K.F.C. Lommel S.K.	Free Transfer	

=== Out ===
Date	Position	No.	Player	From club	Notes	Ref.
31 May 2023	MF	13	(Netherlands) Leeroy Owusu	(Denmark) Odense Boldklub	Free Transfer	
9 June 2023	FW	7	(Belgium) Elton Kabangu	(Belgium) Royale Union Saint-Gilloise	Free Transfer	
24 June 2023	DF	6	(Netherlands) Wessel Dammers	(Denmark) Randers FC	Transfer	
3 July 2023	FW	9	(Netherlands) Jizz Hornkamp	(Netherlands) Heracles Almelo	Transfer	
4 July 2023	MF	22	(Netherlands) Wesley Spieringhs	(Netherlands) Roda JC Kerkrade	Free Transfer	
4 August 2023	GK	1	(Greece) Kostas Lamprou	(Netherlands) Feyenoord	Free Transfer	
4 August 2023	MF	8	(Spain) Pol Llonch	(Spain) SD Ponferradina	Free Transfer	
5 August 2023	DF	25	(Netherlands) Lucas Woudenberg	(France) Valenciennes FC	Transfer	
1 September 2023	FW	14	(Netherlands) Joeri Schroijen	(Netherlands) Helmond Sport	Free Transfer	
24 October 2023	FW	36	(Netherlands) Jelte Pal	Without a team	Terminated	

== Pre-season and friendlies ==
Win Draw Loss Fixtures

15 July 2023 Friendly	Willem II (Netherlands)	4–0	(Netherlands) Eindhoven
13:00 CEST (UTC+2)

22 July 2023 Friendly	Westerlo (Belgium)	2–1	(Netherlands) Willem II
18:00 CEST (UTC+2)

25 July 2023 Friendly	Willem II (Netherlands)	0–1	(Belgium) RFC Liège
16:00 CEST (UTC+2)

29 July 2023 Friendly	Willem II (Netherlands)	0–3	(Netherlands) Sparta Rotterdam
13:00 CEST (UTC+2)

5 August 2023 Friendly	Beveren (Belgium)	2–3	(Netherlands) Willem II
16:00 CEST (UTC+2)

== Competitions ==
=== Overall record ===
Competition	First match	Last match	Starting round	Final position	Record							
Competition	First match	Last match	Starting round	Final position	Pld	W	D	L	GF	GA	GD	Win %
Eerste Divisie	13 August 2023	10 May 2024	Matchday 1	1st	38	23	10	5	77	35	+42	60.53
KNVB Cup	2 November 2023	19 December 2023	First round	Second round	2	1	0	1	4	4	+0	50.00
Total					40	24	10	6	81	39	+42	60.00

Last updated: 10 May 2024
Source: Soccerway

=== Eerste Divisie ===
==== League table ====
Pos	Team	Pld	W	D	L	GF	GA	GD	Pts	Promotion or qualification
1	Willem II (Note: Winner of the Second Period (Rounds 10–19)) (C, P)	38	23	10	5	77	35	+42	79	Promotion to the Eredivisie
2	Groningen (Note: Winner of the Third and Fourth Period (Rounds 20–29 and 30–38)) (P)	38	22	9	7	71	30	+41	75	Promotion to the Eredivisie
3	Roda JC Kerkrade (Note: Winner of the First Period (Rounds 1–9))	38	21	12	5	69	34	+35	75	Qualification for promotion play-offs
4	Dordrecht	38	18	15	5	74	51	+23	69	Qualification for promotion play-offs
5	ADO Den Haag	38	17	12	9	72	50	+22	63	Qualification for promotion play-offs

Source: Flashscore, Keuken Kampioen Divisie (in Dutch)
Rules for classification: Season in progress: 1) Most points won; 2) Less points lost; 3) Goal difference; 4) Goals scored; 5) Alphabetical order; End of season: 1) Points; 2) Goal difference; 3) Goals scored; 4) Head-to-head points; 5) Head-to-head goal difference; 6) Head-to-head away goals scored; 7) Play-off if relevant for deciding champion, relegation or participating in a European league, otherwise by draw. 8) Penalty shoot-out (only after a play-off)
(C) Champions; (P) Promoted

==== Results summary ====
Overall								Home						Away					
Pld	W	D	L	GF	GA	GD	Pts	W	D	L	GF	GA	GD	W	D	L	GF	GA	GD
38	23	10	5	77	35	+42	79	14	3	2	45	21	+24	9	7	3	32	14	+18

Last updated: 10 May 2024.

==== Results by round ====
Round	1	2	3	4	5	6	7	8	9	10	11	12	13	14	15	16	17	18	19	20	21	22	23	24	25	26	27	28	29	30	31	32	33	34	35	36	37	38
Ground	A	H	A	H	H	A	A	H	H	H	A	H	A	H	A	A	H	A	H	A	A	H	A	H	A	H	H	A	H	A	H	A	A	H	A	H	A	H
Result	D	W	D	L	W	L	W	W	W	W	W	W	L	W	W	W	W	D	W	W	W	D	D	D	W	W	L	L	W	W	W	W	D	W	D	D	D	W
Position	11	2	5	15	11	12	10	5	4	2	2	2	2	1	1	1	1	1	1	1	1	1	1	1	1	1	1	1	1	1	1	1	1	1	1	1	1	1

Updated to match(es) played on 10 May 2024. Source:
A = Away; H = Home; W = Win; D = Draw; L = Loss

==== Matches ====
The league fixtures were unveiled on 30 June 2023. '

13 August 2023 1	Eindhoven	1–1	Willem II	Eindhoven
12:15 CEST (UTC+2)	Van Doorm 56'	Report	Meerveld 19'	Stadium: Jan Louwers Stadion; Attendance: 2,641; Referee: Erwin Blank

18 August 2023 2	Willem II	2–0	Dordrecht	Tilburg
20:00 CEST (UTC+2)	De Leeuw 32'; Svensson 49'	Report		Stadium: Koning Willem II Stadion; Attendance: 12,520; Referee: Robin Hensgens

27 August 2023 3	Groningen	0–0	Willem II	Groningen
14:30 CEST (UTC+2)	Rente (yellow card) 59'; Bacuna (yellow card) 90+1'	Report	Bokila (yellow card) 43'; Bosch (yellow card) 77'	Stadium: Euroborg; Attendance: 20,721; Referee: Sander van der Eijk

5 September 2023 4	Willem II	1–4	NAC Breda	Tilburg
10:30 CEST (UTC+2)	Oosting 64'	Report	Sejdiu 4', 74'; Haugen 29'; Van den Bergh 49'	Stadium: Koning Willem II Stadion; Attendance: 13,836; Referee: Edwin van de Graaf

8 September 2023 5	Willem II	2–1	MVV Maastricht	Tilburg
21:00 CEST (UTC+2)	Bosch 34'; Heerkens 69'	Report	Taşçı 29'	Stadium: Koning Willem II Stadion; Attendance: 12,260; Referee: Clay Ruperti

17 September 2023 6	Cambuur	1–0	Willem II	Leeuwarden
16:45 CEST (UTC+2)	El Hilali 29'	Report		Stadium: Cambuur Stadion; Attendance: 9,852; Referee: Dennis Higler

3 October 2023 7	Willem II	2–1	TOP Oss	Tilburg
20:00 CEST (UTC+2)	Behounek 61'; Bokila 82'		Van Eijma 39'	Stadium: Koning Willem II Stadion; Attendance: 12,679; Referee: Alex Bos
Note: The match was originally scheduled for 22 September 2023, but was postponed due to heavy rains making the field unplayable.

29 September 2023 8	Jong AZ	0–2	Willem II	Wijdewormer
20:00 CEST (UTC+2)			Svensson 5'; Bosch 67'	Stadium: AFAS Trainingscomplex; Attendance: 627; Referee: Stan Teuben

6 October 2023 9	Willem II	4–2	De Graafschap	Tilburg
20:00 CEST (UTC+2)	Hillen 28' (own); Bokila 77', 79'; De Waal 83'		Önal 22'; Colyn 58'	Stadium: Koning Willem II Stadion; Attendance: 13,515; Referee: Pol van Boekel

15 October 2023 10	Willem II	3–1	FC Den Bosch	Tilburg
14:30 CEST (UTC+2)	Hilterman 30'; Bokila 68', 88' (pen.)		Kostorz 11'	Stadium: Koning Willem II Stadion; Attendance: 10,594; Referee: Martijn Vos

21 October 2023 11	Roda	0–1	Willem II	Kerkrade
20:00 CEST (UTC+2)			Oosting 14'	Stadium: Parkstad Limburg Stadion; Attendance: 10,631; Referee: Marc Nagtegaal

27 October 2023 12	Willem II	3–0	Jong PSV	Tilburg
20:00 CEST (UTC+2)	Oosting 44', 57'; Hilterman 53'			Stadium: Koning Willem II Stadion; Attendance: 13,064; Referee: Kevin Puts

6 November 2023 13	Jong Ajax	1–0	Willem II	Ouder-Amstel
20:00 CEST (UTC+2)	Idumbo Muzambo 9'			Stadium: Sportpark De Toekomst; Attendance: 946; Referee: Nick Smit

10 November 2023 14	Willem II	2–1	Jong FC Utrecht	Tilburg
20:00 CEST (UTC+2)	Svensson 67'; Hilterman 77'		Nazjir Held 21'; Mees Akkerman (yellow card) 65' (yellow-red card) 68'	Stadium: Koning Willem II Stadion; Attendance: 12,909; Referee: Jannick van der Laan

17 November 2023 15	VVV-Venlo	1–3	Willem II	Venlo
20:00 CEST (UTC+2)	Ketting 89'; Robert Klaasen (red card) 44'		Oosting 57'; Behounek 63'; Herkens 80'	Stadium: De Koel; Attendance: 5,715; Referee: Clay Ruperti

24 November 2023 16	SC Telstar	1–5	Willem II	Velsen
20:00 CEST (UTC+2)	Eddahchouri 60'		Doodeman 9', 74'; Hilterman 33'; Oosting 54'; Bosch 59'	Stadium: 711 Stadion; Attendance: 2,419; Referee: Marc Nagtegaal

1 December 2023 17	Willem II	3–0	FC Emmen	Tilburg
20:00 CEST (UTC+2)	Hilterman 50'; Bokila 80', 84'			Stadium: Koning Willem II Stadion; Attendance: 12,639; Referee: Stan Teuben

8 December 2023 18	ADO Den Haag	1–1	Willem II	The Hague
20:00 CEST (UTC+2)	Absalem (yellow card) 21' (yellow-red card) 90+4', (goal) 30'; Esajas (yellow card) 23'; Asante (yellow card) 77'		Hilterman 90+5'	Stadium: ADO Den Haag Stadium; Attendance: 7,658; Referee: Dennis Johan Higler

15 December 2023 19	Willem II	4–1	Helmond Sport	Tilburg
20:00 CEST (UTC+2)	Meerveld 31'; Oosting 51'; Hilterman 60' (pen.); Bokila 69'; Schouten (yellow card) 75'; Lachkar (yellow card) 83'	Report	Kaars 45+2'; Van Vlerken (yellow card) 87'	Stadium: Koning Willem II Stadion; Attendance: 13,638; Referee: Sander van der Eijk

22 December 2023 20	NAC Breda	1–2	Willem II	Breda
20:00 CEST (UTC+2)	Lucassen (yellow card) 78'; Marijnissen 90'; Omgba (yellow card) 90+1'; Vet (yellow card) 90+2'; Troost (yellow card) 90+5'	Report	Hilterman 9', 33', (yellow card) 10'; Behounek (yellow card) 72'; Smits (yellow card) 90+6'	Stadium: Rat Verlegh Stadion; Attendance: 18,638; Referee: Allard Lindhout

12 January 2024 21	TOP Oss	0–5	Willem II	Oss
20:00 CEST (UTC+2)		Report	Meerveld 14', 71'; Verreth 43'; Bokila 61', 66'; Rúnar Thór Sigurgeirsson (yellow card) 63'	Stadium: Frans Heesen Stadion; Attendance: 2,678; Referee: Stan Teuben

19 January 2024 22	Willem II	1–1	Jong Ajax	Tilburg
20:00 CEST (UTC+2)	Meerveld 6', (yellow card) 34'; de Leeuw (yellow card) 60'	Report	Misehouy 14'; Sarfo (yellow card) 20'; Chourak (yellow card) 56'; Henry (yellow card) 73'	Stadium: Koning Willem II Stadion; Attendance: 13,860; Referee: Jesse Rozendal

27 October 2023 23	Jong PSV	1–1	Willem II	Eindhoven
20:00 CEST (UTC+2)	Babadi 66'; Jimenez 77	Report	Khaled Razak 80; Sigurgeirsson 87'	Stadium: De Herdgang; Attendance: 1,180; Referee: Luuk Timmer

2 February 2024 24	Willem II	1–1	SC Cambuur	Tilburg
20:00 CEST (UTC+2)	St. Jago (yellow card) 19'; Oosting 22'	Report	Smit 7' (pen.); Balk (yellow card) 17'	Stadium: Koning Willem II Stadion; Attendance: 13,579; Referee: Erwin Blank

9 February 2024 25	De Graafschap	0–2	Willem II	Doetinchem
20:00 CEST (UTC+2)	Büttner (yellow card) 83'; Warmerdam (yellow card) 93'; Önal (yellow card) 95'	Report	Oosting 9'; Meerveld 49'; Doodeman (yellow card) 61'; Verreth (yellow card) 95'	Stadium: De Vijverberg; Attendance: 11.756; Referee: Ingmaar Oostrom

16 February 2024 26	Willem II	2–1	ADO Den Haag	Tilburg
20:00 CEST (UTC+2)	Meerveld 11'; Bosch 16'; Behounek (yellow card) 38'	Report	Asante (yellow card) 55'; Van der Sande (yellow card) 72'; Esajas (yellow card) 77'; Derijck 86'	Stadium: Koning Willem II Stadion; Attendance: 13,888; Referee: Alex Bos

23 February 2024 27	Willem II	2-3	Roda JC Kerkrade	Tilburg
20:00 CEST (UTC+2)	Hilterman 14'; Schouten 22'; Heerkens (yellow card) 85'	Report	Zauner 9'; Sejk 65'; Van der Heide (yellow card) 69'; Daneels 85'	Stadium: Koning Willem II Stadion; Attendance: 14230; Referee: Danny Makkelie

8 March 2024 28	FC Emmen	0–2	Willem II	Emmen
20:00 CEST (UTC+2)	Besuijen 21'; Schouten (yellow card) 38'; Scholte (yellow card) 85'; Bradley van Hoeven 89'	Report	Bosch (yellow card) 37'; St. Jago (yellow card) 80'	Stadium: De Oude Meerdijk; Attendance: 7475; Referee: Allard Lindhout

8 March 2024 29	Willem II	3-0	FC Eindhoven	Tilburg
20:00 CEST (UTC+2)	Oosting 7'; St. Jago 52'; Bokila 74'	Report	El Bouchataoui (yellow card) 79'	Stadium: Koning Willem II Stadion; Attendance: 13.416; Referee: Marc Nagtegaal

15 March 2024 30	FC Den Bosch	1–4	Willem II	's-Hertogenbosch
20:00 CEST (UTC+2)	Oulad M'Hand 16'; Ogbaidze (yellow card) 72'; Yuya Ikeshita (yellow card) 77'; Zelalem (yellow card) 85'	Report	Bosch 12'; Hilterman 25'; Hilterman 56'; Vermeulen (yellow card) 77'; St. Jago 90'	Stadium: De Vliert; Attendance: 4956; Referee: Jannick van der Laan

23 March 2024 31	Willem II	2-0	VVV-Venlo	Tilburg
20:00 CEST (UTC+2)	Hilterman 19'; St. Jago (yellow card) 45+1'; Ketting 47' (own)	Report	Janssen (yellow card) 16'	Stadium: Koning Willem II Stadion; Attendance: 13,557; Referee: Dennis Johan Higler

29 March 2024 32	Helmond Sport	0-2	Willem II	Helmond
20:00 CEST (UTC+2)	Krätschmer (yellow card) 82'	Report	Meerveld 39'; Oosting 45+2'; Bosch (yellow card) 69'	Stadium: GS Staalwerken Stadion; Attendance: 3325; Referee: Alex Bos

8 April 2024 33	Jong FC Utrecht	1-1	Willem II	Utrecht
20:00 CEST (UTC+2)	Held (yellow card) 63'; Descotte 86'	Report	Bokila (yellow card) 71'; Oosting 45+2'	Stadium: Stadion Galgenwaard; Attendance: 876; Referee: Boyd van Kommer

12 April 2024 34	Willem II	4-1	Jong AZ	Tilburg
20:00 CEST (UTC+2)	Svensson 23', (yellow card) 43'; Lachkar (yellow card) 30' (yellow-red card) 90'; Nizet 34'; Hilterman 52'; De Leeuw 90+2'	Report	Stam 14'	Stadium: Koning Willem II Stadion; Attendance: 13,684; Referee: Richard Martens

20 April 2024 35	MVV Maastricht	1-1	Willem II	Maastricht
20:00 CEST (UTC+2)	Livramento 11', (yellow card) 41'	Report	Razak (yellow card) 68'; Hilterman 90'	Stadium: De Geusselt; Attendance: 7,803; Referee: Jaanick van der Laan

26 April 2024 36	Willem II	1-1	FC Groningen	Tilburg
20:00 CEST (UTC+2)	Doodeman 57'; Bosch (yellow card) 59'	Report	Duarte (yellow card) 6'; Schreuders 62'; Bacuna (yellow card) 81'; Mendes (yellow card) 83'	Stadium: Koning Willem II Stadion; Referee: Rob Dieperink

3 May 2024 37	FC Dordrecht	1-1	Willem II	Dordrecht
20:00 CEST (UTC+2)	Receveur (yellow card) 25'; 't Zand 28'; 't Zand (yellow card) 43'; Kluivert (yellow card) 79'	Report	De Leeuw 90+3'	Stadium: Stadion Krommedijk; Attendance: 4018; Referee: Jeroen Manschot

10 May 2024 38	Willem II	3-2	SC Telstar	Tilburg
20:00 CEST (UTC+2)	Oosting 47'; Nizet 81'; Meerveld 90+3'	Report	Kruiver 33'; Heerkens 45' (own)	Stadium: Koning Willem II Stadion; Referee: Marc Nagtegaal

=== KNVB Cup ===
2 November 2023 First round	VV SJC	1–3	Willem II	Noordwijk
20:00 CET (UTC+1)	Martijn van Trigt 11'		Svensson 15'; St. Jago 19'; Hilterman 90+2'	Stadium: Gemeentelijk Sportpark SJC

19 December 2023 Second round	Willem II	1–3	FC Groningen	Tilburg
20:00 CET (UTC+1)	Bosch 56'		Valente 21'; Duarte 75'; Postema 84' (pen.)	Stadium: Koning Willem II Stadion; Referee: Bas Nijhuis

== Awards ==
=== Team Awards ===
Award	Competition	Ref.
Second Period Champions	Eerste Divisie	
Season Champions	Eerste Divisie	

=== Individual Awards ===
Award	Player	Competition	Ref.
Best Keeper	(Netherlands) Joshua Smits	Eerste Divisie	
