= 2022–23 Willem II season =

Willem II
2022–23 season
- Chairman: Jan van der Laak
- Manager: Kevin Hofland
- Stadium: Koning Willem II Stadion
- Eerste Divisie: 4th
- KNVB Cup: First round
- Top goalscorer: League: Elton Kabangu (12); All: Elton Kabangu (12)

The 2022–23 season was the 110th season in the history of Willem II. The club participated in the Eerste Divisie, following relegating from the Eredivisie in 2021–22, and the KNVB Cup. The season covered the period from 1 July 2022 to 30 June 2023.

== Players ==
As of 24 August 2022

Note: Flags indicate national team as defined under FIFA eligibility rules; some limited exceptions apply. Players may hold more than one non-FIFA nationality.

| No. | Pos. | Nation | Player |
|---|---|---|---|
| 1 | GK | GRE | Kostas Lamprou |
| 3 | DF | NED | Freek Heerkens (2nd captain) |
| 4 | DF | NED | Erik Schouten |
| 5 | DF | BEL | Thibaut Lesquoy |
| 6 | DF | NED | Wessel Dammers |
| 7 | FW | BEL | Elton Kabangu |
| 8 | MF | ESP | Pol Llonch (captain) |
| 9 | FW | NED | Jizz Hornkamp |
| 10 | MF | BEL | Matthias Verreth |
| 11 | FW | SWE | Max Svensson |
| 13 | DF | NED | Leeroy Owusu |
| 14 | FW | NED | Joeri Schroyen |

| No. | Pos. | Nation | Player |
|---|---|---|---|
| 16 | MF | NED | Ringo Meerveld |
| 18 | FW | COD | Jeremy Bokila |
| 19 | MF | IRL | Daniel Crowley |
| 21 | GK | NED | Joshua Smits |
| 22 | MF | NED | Wesley Spieringhs |
| 23 | FW | NED | Michael de Leeuw |
| 24 | GK | NED | Connor van den Berg |
| 25 | DF | NED | Lucas Woudenberg |
| 27 | MF | NED | Dani Mathieu |
| 29 | MF | NED | Thijs Oosting |
| 32 | MF | NED | Jesse Bosch |
| 37 | FW | NED | Nick Doodeman |

== Pre-season and friendlies ==
Win Draw Loss Fixtures

| 9 July 2022 Friendly | Willem II (Netherlands) | 2–0 | (Netherlands) Telstar | Loon op Zand |
| 14:30 CEST (UTC+2) | | | | Stadium: Sportpark De Klokkenberg |

| 15 July 2022 Friendly | Willem II (Netherlands) | 1–2 | (Netherlands) De Graafschap | Oisterwijk |
| 13:00 CEST (UTC+2) | Nshimirimana 75' | | McCausland 70'; Lammers 79' | Stadium: Taxandria-velden |
Note: The match was played in four quarters 30 minutes each.

| 20 July 2022 Friendly | Willem II (Netherlands) | 0–2 | (Netherlands) Sparta Rotterdam | Loon op Zand |
| 13:00 CEST (UTC+2) | | | | Stadium: Sportpark De Klokkenberg |

| 23 July 2022 Friendly | Willem II (Netherlands) | 5–0 | (France) Lyon | Tilburg |
| 16:00 CEST (UTC+2) | Heerkens 21'; Hornkamp 25', 32'; Bokila 48'; Doodeman 60' | | | Stadium: Koning Willem II Stadion |

| 30 July 2022 Friendly | Lommel (Belgium) | 1–3 | (Netherlands) Willem II | Lommel, Belgium |
| 18:00 CEST (UTC+2) | | | | Stadium: Soevereinstadion |

| 30 November 2022 Friendly | Willem II (Netherlands) | v | (Netherlands) BSV Limburgia | Brunssum |
| 19:30 CEST (UTC+2) | | | | Stadium: Sportpark Houserveld |

== Competitions ==
=== Overall record ===
| Competition | First match | Last match | Starting round | Final position | Record | | | | | | | |
| Competition | First match | Last match | Starting round | Final position | Pld | W | D | L | GF | GA | GD | Win % |
|---|---|---|---|---|---|---|---|---|---|---|---|---|
| Eerste Divisie | 5 August 2022 | 19 May 2023 | Matchday 1 | | 38 | 19 | 11 | 8 | 68 | 40 | +28 | 50.00 |
| KNVB Cup | 18 October 2022 | | First round | First round | 1 | 0 | 0 | 1 | 0 | 1 | −1 | 0.00 |
| Total | | | | | 39 | 19 | 11 | 9 | 68 | 41 | +27 | 48.72 |

Last updated: 19 May 2023
Source: Soccerway

=== Eerste Divisie ===
==== League table ====
| Pos | Team | Pld | W | D | L | GF | GA | GD | Pts | Promotion or qualification |
|---|---|---|---|---|---|---|---|---|---|---|
| 2 | PEC Zwolle (Note: Winner of the Second Period (Rounds 11–19)) (P) | 38 | 27 | 4 | 7 | 99 | 43 | +56 | 85 | Promotion to the Eredivisie |
| 3 | Almere City (Note: Winner of the Third Period (Rounds 20–28)) (O, P) | 38 | 21 | 7 | 10 | 58 | 41 | +17 | 70 | Qualification for promotion play-offs |
| 4 | Willem II | 38 | 19 | 11 | 8 | 68 | 40 | +28 | 68 | Qualification for promotion play-offs |
| 5 | MVV Maastricht | 38 | 18 | 5 | 15 | 65 | 65 | 0 | 59 | Qualification for promotion play-offs |
| 6 | NAC Breda | 38 | 18 | 5 | 15 | 64 | 64 | 0 | 59 | Qualification for promotion play-offs |

Source: Soccerway, Keuken Kampioen Divisie (in Dutch)
Rules for classification: Season in progress: 1) Most points won; 2) Less points lost; 3) Goal difference; 4) Goals scored; 5) Alphabetical order; End of season: 1) Points; 2) Goal difference; 3) Goals scored; 4) Head-to-head points; 5) Head-to-head goal difference; 6) Head-to-head away goals scored; 7) Play-off if relevant for deciding champion, relegation or participating in a European league, otherwise by draw. 8) Penalty shoot-out (only after a play-off)
(O) Play-off winners; (P) Promoted

==== Results summary ====
| Overall | | | | | | | | Home | | | | | | Away | | | | | |
| Pld | W | D | L | GF | GA | GD | Pts | W | D | L | GF | GA | GD | W | D | L | GF | GA | GD |
|---|---|---|---|---|---|---|---|---|---|---|---|---|---|---|---|---|---|---|---|
| 38 | 19 | 11 | 8 | 68 | 40 | +28 | 68 | 13 | 2 | 4 | 37 | 17 | +20 | 6 | 9 | 4 | 31 | 23 | +8 |

Last updated: 19 May 2023.
Source: Keuken Kampioen Divisie

==== Results by round ====
| Round | 1 | 2 | 3 | 4 | 5 | 6 | 7 | 8 | 9 | 10 | 11 | 12 | 13 | 14 | 15 | 16 | 17 | 18 | 19 | 20 | 21 | 22 | 23 | 24 | 25 | 26 | 27 | 28 | 29 | 30 | 31 | 32 | 33 | 34 | 35 | 36 | 37 | 38 |
|---|---|---|---|---|---|---|---|---|---|---|---|---|---|---|---|---|---|---|---|---|---|---|---|---|---|---|---|---|---|---|---|---|---|---|---|---|---|---|
| Ground | H | A | H | A | H | A | H | A | A | H | A | H | A | H | A | A | H | A | H | A | H | A | H | H | A | H | A | H | A | H | A | H | A | H | H | A | H | A |
| Result | D | L | W | D | W | D | W | W | L | L | W | D | W | L | D | D | L | W | W | L | W | L | W | W | D | W | D | L | W | W | W | W | D | W | W | D | W | D |
| Position | | | | | | | | | | | | | | | | | | | | | | | | | | | | | | | | | | | | | | |

Updated to match(es) played on 19 May 2023. Source: Keuken Kampioen Divisie
A = Away; H = Home; W = Win; D = Draw; L = Loss

==== Matches ====
The league fixtures were announced on 17 June 2022.

| 5 August 2022 1 | Willem II | 1–1 | Jong PSV | Tilburg |
| CEST (UTC+2) | | | | Stadium: Koning Willem II Stadion |

| 12 August 2022 2 | FC Eindhoven | 2–1 | Willem II | Eindhoven |
| CEST (UTC+2) |

| 19 August 2022 3 | Willem II | 2–1 | Telstar | Tilburg |
| CEST (UTC+2) | | | | Stadium: Koning Willem II Stadion |

| 29 August 2022 4 | Jong Utrecht | 0–0 | Willem II | Utrecht |
| CEST (UTC+2) |

| 2 September 2022 5 | Willem II | 1–0 | ADO Den Haag | Tilburg |
| CEST (UTC+2) | | | | Stadium: Koning Willem II Stadion |

| 9 September 2022 6 | PEC Zwolle | 2–2 | Willem II | Zwolle |
| CEST (UTC+2) |

| 16 September 2022 7 | Willem II | 1–0 | Jong AZ | Tilburg |
| CEST (UTC+2) | | | | Stadium: Koning Willem II Stadion |

| 23 September 2022 8 | TOP Oss | 1–3 | Willem II | Oss |
| CEST (UTC+2) |

| 30 September 2022 9 | MVV Maastricht | 3–2 | Willem II | Maastricht |
| CEST (UTC+2) |

| 7 October 2022 10 | Willem II | 1–2 | Den Bosch | Tilburg |
| CEST (UTC+2) | | | | Stadium: Koning Willem II Stadion |

| 14 October 2022 11 | Helmond Sport | 1–3 | Willem II | Helmond |
| CEST (UTC+2) |

| 21 October 2022 14 | Willem II | 1–1 | Almere City | Tilburg |
| CEST (UTC+2) | | | | Stadium: Koning Willem II Stadion |

| 31 October 2022 15 | Jong Ajax | 1–2 | Willem II | Amsterdam |
| 20:00 CET (UTC+1) | | | | Referee: Martijn Vos |

| 3 February 2023 23 | Willem II | 5–1 | Helmond Sport | Tilburg |
| CET (UTC+1) | | | | Stadium: Koning Willem II Stadion |

| 10 February 2023 24 | Willem II | 1–0 | Dordrecht | Tilburg |
| CET (UTC+1) | | | | Stadium: Koning Willem II Stadion |

| 17 February 2023 25 | Heracles Almelo | 1–1 | Willem II | Almelo |
| CET (UTC+1) |

| 24 February 2023 26 | Willem II | 2–1 | Jong Ajax | Tilburg |
| CET (UTC+1) | | | | Stadium: Koning Willem II Stadion |

| 6 March 2023 27 | Jong AZ | 2–2 | Willem II | Alkmaar |
| CET (UTC+1) |

| 10 March 2023 28 | Willem II | 2–3 | PEC Zwolle | Tilburg |
| CET (UTC+1) | | | | Stadium: Koning Willem II Stadion |

| 17 March 2023 29 | ADO Den Haag | 1–3 | Willem II | The Hague |
| CET (UTC+1) |

| 26 March 2023 30 | Willem II | 2–0 | MVV Maastricht | Tilburg |
| CEST (UTC+2) | | | | Stadium: Koning Willem II Stadion |

| 2 April 2023 31 | Den Bosch | 0–2 | Willem II | 's-Hertogenbosch |
| 12:15 CEST (UTC+2) | | | Oosting 44'; Schouten 63' | Stadium: De Vliert; Referee: Marc Nagtegaal |

| 9 April 2023 32 | Willem II | 2–1 | VVV-Venlo | Tilburg |
| 12:15 CEST (UTC+2) | Hornkamp 63' | | Braken 63' | Stadium: Koning Willem II Stadion; Referee: Allard Lindhout |

| 21 April 2023 34 | Willem II | 4–0 | TOP Oss | Tilburg |
| CEST (UTC+2) | | | | Stadium: Koning Willem II Stadion |

| 25 April 2023 33 | NAC Breda | 1–1 | Willem II | Breda |
| CEST (UTC+2) |

| 29 April 2023 35 | Willem II | 3–2 | De Graafschap | Tilburg |
| 21:00 CEST (UTC+2) | | | | Stadium: Koning Willem II Stadion; Referee: Martin van den Kerkhof |

| 5 May 2023 36 | Telstar | 0-0 | Willem II | Velsen |
| 20:00 CEST (UTC+2) | | | | Stadium: BUKO Stadion; Referee: Alex Bos |

| 12 May 2023 37 | Willem II | 3-0 | Jong Utrecht | Tilburg |
| 20:00 CEST (UTC+2) | | | | Stadium: Koning Willem II Stadion; Referee: Robin Gansner |

| 19 May 2023 38 | Roda JC | 2-2 | Willem II | Kerkrade |
| 20:00 CEST (UTC+2) | | | | Referee: Laurens Gerrets |
