= 2021–22 Willem II season =

Willem II
2021–22 season
- Chairman: Jack Buckens
- Head coach: Fred Grim
- Stadium: Koning Willem II Stadion
- Eredivisie: 17th (relegated)
- KNVB Cup: First round
- Top goalscorer: League: Ché Nunnely (6); All: Ché Nunnely (6)
- Highest home attendance: 9,700 (vs. Feyenoord, 15 August 2021)
- Lowest home attendance: 9,700 (vs. Feyenoord, 15 August 2021)
- Average home league attendance: 9,700
- Biggest win: 3-0 (vs. Vitesse, 22 August 2021)
- Biggest defeat: 0–4 (vs. Feyenoord, 15 August 2021)

The 2021–22 season was the 125th season in the existence of Willem II and the club's eighth consecutive season in the top flight of Dutch football. In addition to the domestic league, Willem II participated in this season's editions of the KNVB Cup.

== Players ==
=== First-team squad ===
As of 12 March 2022

Note: Flags indicate national team as defined under FIFA eligibility rules; some limited exceptions apply. Players may hold more than one non-FIFA nationality.

No.	Pos.	Nation	Player
2	DF	GER	Kilian Ludewig (on loan from Red Bull Salzburg)
3	DF	NED	Freek Heerkens (2nd captain)
4	DF	NOR	Ulrik Yttergård Jenssen
5	DF	SWE	Emil Bergström (3rd captain, on loan from FC Utrecht)
6	DF	NED	Wessel Dammers (on loan from FC Groningen)
7	FW	NED	Ché Nunnely
8	MF	ESP	Pol Llonch (captain)
9	FW	NED	Jizz Hornkamp
10	FW	GRE	Argyris Kampetsis (on loan from Panathinaikos)
11	FW	GER	Mats Köhlert
12	MF	NED	Rick Zuijderwijk
13	DF	NED	Leeroy Owusu
14	FW	BEL	Elton Kabangu
15	FW	SWE	Max Svensson
16	MF	NED	Ringo Meerveld

No.	Pos.	Nation	Player
17	MF	NED	Dries Saddiki
18	DF	NED	Miquel Nelom
19	MF	IRL	Daniel Crowley
20	MF	NED	Godfried Roemeratoe (on loan from FC Twente)
21	GK	GER	Timon Wellenreuther (4th captain, on loan from Anderlecht)
22	MF	NED	Wesley Spieringhs
23	MF	GER	Görkem Sağlam
24	GK	NED	Connor van den Berg
25	DF	GRE	Nikos Michelis (on loan from Milan)
26	GK	BEL	Jorn Brondeel
27	DF	GER	Derrick Köhn
28	DF	NED	Vincent Schippers
29	MF	NED	Thijs Oosting
32	MF	NED	Abdenasser El Khayati
36	FW	NED	Jelte Pal

=== Out on loan ===
Note: Flags indicate national team as defined under FIFA eligibility rules; some limited exceptions apply. Players may hold more than one non-FIFA nationality.

No.	Pos.	Nation	Player
—	FW	GER	John Yeboah (at MSV Duisburg until 30 June 2022)

== Pre-season and friendlies ==
Win Draw Loss Fixtures

10 July 2021 Friendly	Quick Boys (Netherlands)	2–5	(Netherlands) Willem II	Netherlands
15:00 CEST (UTC+2)

17 July 2021 Friendly	Willem II (Netherlands)	2–0	(Netherlands) Excelsior	Netherlands
14:30 CEST (UTC+2)

24 July 2021 Friendly	Willem II (Netherlands)	4–1	(Belgium) Lierse	Netherlands
13:00 CEST (UTC+2)

31 July 2021 Friendly	Go Ahead Eagles (Netherlands)	Cancelled	(Netherlands) Willem II	Netherlands
19:30 CEST (UTC+2)

7 August 2021 Friendly	Willem II (Netherlands)	Cancelled	(Netherlands) Sparta Rotterdam	Netherlands
14:00 CEST (UTC+2)

== Competitions ==
=== Overall record ===
Competition	First match	Last match	Starting round	Final position	Record							
Competition	First match	Last match	Starting round	Final position	Pld	W	D	L	GF	GA	GD	Win %
Eredivisie	15 August 2021	15 May 2021	Matchday 1		33	8	6	19	29	57	−28	24.24
KNVB Cup	28 October 2021		First round	First round	1	0	0	1	0	3	−3	0.00
Total					34	8	6	20	29	60	−31	23.53

Last updated: 11 May 2022
Source: Soccerway

=== Eredivisie ===
==== League table ====
Pos	Team	Pld	W	D	L	GF	GA	GD	Pts	Qualification or relegation
14	Sparta Rotterdam	34	8	11	15	30	48	−18	35	
15	Fortuna Sittard	34	10	5	19	36	67	−31	35	
16	Heracles Almelo (R)	34	9	7	18	33	49	−16	34	Qualification for the Relegation play-offs
17	Willem II (R)	34	9	6	19	32	57	−25	33	Relegation to Eerste Divisie
18	PEC Zwolle (R)	34	7	6	21	26	52	−26	27	Relegation to Eerste Divisie

Source: Eredivisie
Rules for classification: Season in progress: 1) Most points won; 2) Less points lost; 3) Goal difference; 4) Goals scored; 5) Alphabetical order; End of season: 1) Points; 2) Goal difference; 3) Goals scored; 4) Head-to-head points; 5) Head-to-head goal difference; 6) Head-to-head away goals scored; 7) Play-off if relevant for deciding champion, relegation or participating in a European league, otherwise by draw. 8) Penalty shoot-out (only after a play-off)
(R) Relegated

==== Results summary ====
Overall								Home						Away					
Pld	W	D	L	GF	GA	GD	Pts	W	D	L	GF	GA	GD	W	D	L	GF	GA	GD
2	1	0	1	3	4	−1	3	0	0	1	0	4	−4	1	0	0	3	0	+3

Last updated: August 2021.
Source: Eredivisie

==== Results by round ====
Round	1	2	3
Ground	H	A	
Result	L	W	
Position	17	9	

Updated to match(es) played on August 2021. Source: Eredivisie
A = Away; H = Home; W = Win; D = Draw; L = Loss

==== Matches ====
The league fixtures were announced on 11 June 2021.

15 August 2021 1	Willem II	0–4	Feyenoord	Tilburg
16:45 CEST	Bergström (red card) 59'; Köhlert (yellow card) 76'	Report	Linssen 16'; Sinisterra 24'; Til 47'; Bannis 90+1'	Stadium: Koning Willem II Stadion; Referee: Serdar Gözübüyük

22 August 2021 2	Vitesse	0–3	Willem II	Arnhem
16:45 CEST (UTC+2)		Report	Wriedt 18'; Nunnely 36'; Spieringhs 82'	Stadium: GelreDome; Attendance: 11,329; Referee: Allard Lindhout

28 August 2021 3	Willem II	1–0	PEC Zwolle	Tilburg
21:00 CEST				Stadium: Koning Willem II Stadion; Referee: Ingmar Oostrom

12 September 2021 4	NEC Nijmegen	0–0	Willem II	Nijmegen
12:15 CEST (UTC+2)				Stadium: De Goffert; Referee: Paulus van Boekel

18 September 2021 5	Willem II	2–1	FC Groningen	Tilburg
18:45 CEST				Stadium: Koning Willem II Stadion; Referee: Jeroen Manschot

21 September 2021 6	RKC Waalwijk	1–2	Willem II	Waalwijk
21:00CEST (UTC+2)				Stadium: Mandemakers Stadion; Referee: Dennis Higler

25 September 2021 7	Willem II	2–1	PSV	Tilburg
18:45 CEST (UTC+2)	Zahavi 20' (o.g.); Sağlam (yellow card) 43'; Nunnely 76'	Report	Zahavi 30'; Götze (yellow card) 45+1'; Van Ginkel (yellow card) 56'	Stadium: Koning Willem II Stadion; Attendance: 14,503; Referee: Kevin Blom

2 October 2021 8	Heracles Almelo	3–2	Willem II	Almelo
20:00CEST (UTC+2)				Stadium: Erve Asito; Referee: Rob Dieperink

17 October 2021 9	FC Twente	1–1	Willem II	Twente
16:45CEST (UTC+2)				Stadium: De Grolsch Veste; Referee: Jochem Kamphuis

22 October 2021 10	Willem II	1–1	Fortuna Sittard	Tilburg
20:00 CEST				Stadium: Koning Willem II Stadion; Referee: Jannick van der Laan

31 October 2021 11	FC Utrecht	5–1	Willem II	Utrecht
16:45CEST (UTC+2)				Stadium: Stadion Galgenwaard; Referee: Paulus van Boekel

6 November 2021 12	Willem II	0–3	Sparta Rotterdam	Tilburg
20:00 CEST				Stadium: Koning Willem II Stadion; Referee: Joey Kooij

21 November 2021 13	SC Heerenveen	2–1	Willem II	Heerenveen
14:30CEST (UTC+2)				Stadium: Abe Lenstra Stadion; Referee: Serdar Gözübüyük

27 November 2021 14	Willem II	0–1	Go Ahead Eagles	Tilburg
21:00 CEST				Stadium: Koning Willem II Stadion; Referee: Laurens Gerrets

2 December 2021 15	Ajax	5–0	Willem II	Amsterdam
21:00 CET (UTC+1)	Antony 15', 23'; Martínez 18'; Klaassen 71'; Danilo 76'	Report	Saddiki (yellow card) 56'; Yeboah (yellow card) 89'; Köhn (yellow card) 89'	Stadium: Johan Cruyff Arena (roof open); Attendance: 0 Referee: Edwin van de Graaf

10 December 2021 16	Willem II	1–3	SC Cambuur	Tilburg
20:00 CEST				Stadium: Koning Willem II Stadion; Referee: Martin Van den Kerkhof

18 December 2021 17	AZ	4–1	Willem II	Alkmaar
20:00CEST (UTC+2)				Stadium: AFAS Stadion; Referee: Allard Lindhout

22 December 2021 18	Willem II	0–1	NEC Nijmegen	Tilburg
18:45 CEST				Stadium: Koning Willem II Stadion; Referee: Danny Makkelie

19 February 2022 23	Willem II	0–1	Ajax	Tilburg
18:45 CET (UTC+1)			Timber 81'	Stadium: Koning Willem II Stadion; Referee: Pol van Boekel

1 May 2022 31	PSV	4–2	Willem II	Eindhoven
14:30 CEST (UTC+2)	Dōan 2'; Gakpo 31'; Zahavi 45+2'; Dammers 60' (o.g.)	Report	Saddiki (yellow card) 33'; Nunnely 44'; Kabangu 50'	Stadium: Philips Stadion; Attendance: 33,100; Referee: Jochem Kamphuis

=== KNVB Cup ===
28 October 2021 First round	RKC Waalwijk	3–0	Willem II	Waalwijk
21:00 CEST				Stadium: Mandemakers Stadion
