= Jelte =

Jelte or Jeltes is both a given name and a surname. Notable people with the given name and surname include:

== Given name ==
- Jelte Althuis, bass clarinettist of Dutch reed quintet Calefax
- Jelte Amsing (1940–2014), Dutch footballer
- Jelte van Andel, bassist of Dutch rock band Alamo Race Track
- Jelte fan Andringa (fl. 1579–1612), Frisian civil servant, grietman, politician and provincial executive
- Jelte Blommaert, actor that starred in the film Allez, Eddy! and TV series Cordon (TV series)
- Jelte Dijkstra (1879–1946), Dutch writer and teacher
- Jelte van den Dungen, birth name of Jett Rebel (born 1991), Dutch musician
- Jelte Eelsma (1539–1573), Frisian freedom fighter, insurgent, noble, pirate and politician
- Jelte van der Goot (born 1980), Dutch radio presenter
- Jelte Hulzebos (born 1951), Dutch organist and harpsichordist
- Jelte Cornelis Adrianus Marinus van Kluyve (1873–1962), Dutch politician and mayor
- Jelte Krijnsen (born 2001), Dutch cyclist
- Jelte Maan (born 1986), Dutch volleyball player
- Jelte Pal (born 2002), Dutch footballer
- Jelte Rep (born 1940), Dutch journalist
- Jelte Schoonheim (born 1981), Dutch cricketer
- Jelte Sondij (born 1981), Dutch television producer and journalist
- Jelte Wicherts (born 1976), Dutch psychologist, researcher and university professor

== Surname ==
- Cle Jeltes (1924–2010), Dutch sailor and measurer
- Gerhard Jeltes, drummer for the René Klijn version of "Mr Blue" (Yazoo song)

== Middle name ==
- Eise Eisinga (1744–1828; middle name Jeltes), Dutch Frisian astronomer, mathematician, politician, Dutch Patriot, university professor and wood carder
- Jan Ykema (born 1963; middle name Jelte), Dutch speed skater
- Klaas Jeltes Hornstra (1846–1911), Dutch Frisian agriculturalist, dairy factory founder and poor-relief administrator
- Kornelis Jacob Derk Jelte Folkerts (1911–2009), Dutch politician and mayor

== See also ==
- Tom-Jelte Slagter (born 1989), Dutch road bicycle racer
