= Valentino Vermeulen =

Dutch footballer (born 2001)

Personal information
- Date of birth: 20 July 2001 (age 25)
- Place of birth: Eindhoven, Netherlands
- Height: 1.80 m (5 ft 11 in)
- Position: Right-back

Team information
- Current team: FC Džiugas
- Number: 2

Youth career
- –2017: Willem II
- 2017–2019: Eindhoven

Senior career*
Years	Team	Apps	(Gls)
2019–2022	Eindhoven	68	(5)
2022–2023	Borussia Dortmund II	0	(0)
2023–2024	Willem II	21	(0)
2025–	Džiugas	40	(5)
- * Club domestic league appearances and goals as of 18 August 2026 (UTC)

Valentino Vermeulen (born 20 July 2001) is a Dutch professional footballer who most recently played as a right-back for Lithuanian Džiugas Club.

== Club career ==
On 1 June 2022, it was announced that Vermeulen was joining Borussia Dortmund for the 2022–23 season. Borussia clarified in their announcement that he is assigned to Borussia Dortmund II.

On 13 January 2023, Vermeulen returned to Willem II, the club that he played for as a junior, on a 2.5-year contract. On 7 December 2024, Willem II and Valentino Vermeulen mutually agreed to terminate his contract, following his demotion to the U21 squad earlier that season.

June 2025 announced, that Valentino Vermeulen signed with Džiugas Club. On 6 July 2025 Valentino Vermeulen made his debut in A Lyga against Dainava Club. On 2 November 2025 scored his first goal in A Lyga against FK Riteriai. Valentino Vermeulen scored goal, late got red card. On 22 December officially announced, that Valentino Vermeulen stay at Džiugas Club.

== Career statistics ==
=== Club ===
As of 17 December 2024

Appearances and goals by club, season and competition
Club	Season	League			Cup (Note: Includes KNVB Cup)		Continental		Other (Note: Includes the Promotion and relegation play-offs)		Total	
Club	Season	Division	Apps	Goals	Apps	Goals	Apps	Goals	Apps	Goals	Apps	Goals
Eindhoven	2019–20	Eerste Divisie	14	0	1	0	—		—		15	0
Eindhoven	2020–21	Eerste Divisie	18	1	0	0	—		—		18	1
Eindhoven	2021-22	Eerste Divisie	36	4	1	0	—		4	0	41	4
Eindhoven	Total		68	5	2	0	0	0	4	0	74	5
Willem II	2022–23	Eerste Divisie	3	0	0	0	—		2	0	5	0
Willem II	2023–24	Eerste Divisie	15	0	1	0	—		—		16	0
Willem II	2024–25	Eredivisie	3	0	1	0	—		—		4	0
Willem II	Total		21	0	2	0	0	0	2	0	25	0
Career total			89	5	4	0	0	0	6	0	99	5
