= Ringo Meerveld =

Dutch footballer (born 2002)

Personal information
- Date of birth: 21 December 2002 (age 23)
- Place of birth: 's-Hertogenbosch, Netherlands
- Height: 1.74 m (5 ft 9 in)
- Position: Midfielder

Team information
- Current team: Heerenveen
- Number: 10

Youth career
- 2013–2019: FC Den Bosch

Senior career*
Years	Team	Apps	(Gls)
2019–2021	FC Den Bosch	46	(5)
2021–2025	Willem II	105	(14)
2025–	Heerenveen	42	(11)
- * Club domestic league appearances and goals as of 16:29, 8 November 2026 (UTC)

Ringo Meerveld (born 21 December 2002) is a Dutch professional footballer who plays as a midfielder for Eredivisie club Heerenveen.

== Club career ==
Born in 's-Hertogenbosch, Ringo Meerveld began his football career as a youth player at FC Den Bosch. He signed a three-year contract with the club on 2 August 2019. Meerveld made his debut for FC Den Bosch on 12 August 2019 in a 2–2 draw against Jong PSV. On 6 December 2020, he scored his first senior goal for the club, contributing to a 2–2 draw against NEC Nijmegen.

On 31 August 2021, Meerveld transferred to Eredivisie club Willem II. He signed a contract with Willem II that extends until 2025. The transfer fee for his move was reported as €750,000, making it the most expensive player sale in FC Den Bosch's history.

On 18 August 2025, Meerveld signed a four-year contract with Eredivisie club Heerenveen.

== Career statistics ==
As of match played 8 November 2026

Appearances and goals by club, season and competition
Club	Season	League			KNVB Cup		Other		Total	
Club	Season	Division	Apps	Goals	Apps	Goals	Apps	Goals	Apps	Goals
FC Den Bosch	2019–20	Eerste Divisie	10	0	1	0	—		11	0
FC Den Bosch	2020–21	Eerste Divisie	34	5	1	0	—		35	5
FC Den Bosch	2021–22	Eerste Divisie	2	0	0	0	—		2	0
FC Den Bosch	Total		46	5	2	0	0	0	48	5
Willem II	2021–22	Eredivisie	13	0	1	0	—		14	0
Willem II	2022–23	Eerste Divisie	22	0	0	0	2 (Note: Appearances in Eerste Divisie play-offs)	0	24	0
Willem II	2023–24	Eerste Divisie	36	9	1	0	—		37	9
Willem II	2024–25	Eredivisie	33	4	2	0	4	2	39	6
Willem II	2025–26	Eerste Divisie	1	1	—		—		1	1
Willem II	Total		105	14	4	0	6	2	115	16
Heerenveen	2025–26	Eredivisie	30	6	3	1	1 (Note: Appearance in Eredivisie European play-offs)	0	34	7
Heerenveen	2026–27	Eredivisie	12	5	1	0	—		13	5
Heerenveen	Total		42	11	4	1	1	0	47	12
Career total			193	30	10	1	7	2	210	33

== Honours ==
Individual

- Eredivisie Team of the Month: August 2024, December 2024
