= Cisse Sandra =

Belgian footballer (born 2003)

Personal information
- Date of birth: 16 December 2003 (age 22)
- Place of birth: Bellegem, Belgium
- Height: 1.84 m (6 ft 0 in)
- Position: Midfielder

Team information
- Current team: Westerlo
- Number: 14

Youth career
- 2009–2011: KWSC Lauwe
- 2011–2017: Zulte Waregem
- 2016–2020: Club Brugge

Senior career*
Years	Team	Apps	(Gls)
2020–2026	Club NXT	23	(6)
2021–2026	Club Brugge	34	(3)
2023–2024	→ Excelsior (loan)	26	(1)
2024–2025	→ Willem II (loan)	27	(4)
2026–	Westerlo	2	(0)

International career^{‡}
2019	Belgium U17	2	(1)
2021–2022	Belgium U19	9	(3)
2024	Belgium U21	3	(0)
- * Club domestic league appearances and goals as of 15 August 2026 ‡ National team caps and goals as of 20:48, 27 October 2024 (UTC)

Cisse Sandra (born 16 December 2003) is a Belgian professional footballer who plays as a midfielder for Belgian Pro League club Westerlo.

== Club career ==
Cisse Sandra was born on 16 December 2003 in Bellegem, Kortrijk Municipality in West Flanders, where he attended Kinderland Sint-Anna primary school and participated in international football tournaments. At the club level, he started playing youth football for KWSC Lauwe and Zulte Waregem.

In 2016, Sandra moved to Club Brugge's youth academy. On 22 August 2020, Sandra made his debut for Brugge's reserve side, Club NXT in the Belgian First Division B against RWDM47. He came on as a 79th-minute substitute as NXT lost 0–2.

Sandra scored his first professional goal on 30 August 2020 against Lommel. His 80th-minute goal gave NXT the lead but the match soon ended 2–2.

On 22 August 2023, Sandra signed for Eredivisie club Excelsior on a season-long loan deal.

On 4 July 2024, Sandra joined newly promoted Eredivisie club Willem II on a season-long loan deal.

On 4 August 2026, Sandra moved to Westerlo on a four-season deal.

== Career statistics ==
=== Club ===
As of match played 31 July 2026

Appearances and goals by club, season and competition
Club	Season	League			National Cup		Continental		Other		Total	
Club	Season	Division	Apps	Goals	Apps	Goals	Apps	Goals	Apps	Goals	Apps	Goals
Club NXT	2020–21	Challenger Pro League	11	1	—		—		—		11	1
Club NXT	2021–22	Challenger Pro League	0	0	—		—		—		0	0
Club NXT	2022–23	Challenger Pro League	11	5	—		—		2 (Note: Appearances in Challenger Pro League promotion play-offs)	0	13	5
Club NXT	Total		22	6	0	0	0	0	2	0	24	6
Club Brugge	2021–22	Belgian Pro League	7	1	3	0	1	0	1 (Note: Appearance in Belgian Super Cup)	0	12	1
Club Brugge	2022–23	Belgian Pro League	11	1	1	0	1	0	0	0	13	1
Club Brugge	2023–24	Belgian Pro League	0	0	0	0	0	0	0	0	0	0
Club Brugge	2025–26	Belgian Pro League	15	1	2	2	3 (Note: Appearances in UEFA Champions League)	0	1	0	21	3
Club Brugge	2026–27	Belgian Pro League	0	0	0	0	0	0	1	0	1	0
Club Brugge	Total		33	3	6	2	5	0	3	0	47	5
Excelsior Rotterdam (loan)	2023–24	Eredivisie	26	1	1	0	—		4 (Note: Appearances in Eredivisie relegation play-offs)	0	31	1
Willem II (loan)	2024–25	Eredivisie	26	4	1	0	—		3	0	30	4
Career total			107	14	8	2	5	0	12	0	132	16

== Honours ==
Club Brugge

- Belgian Super Cup: 2021
