= Thomas Didillon-Hödl =

French footballer (born 1995)

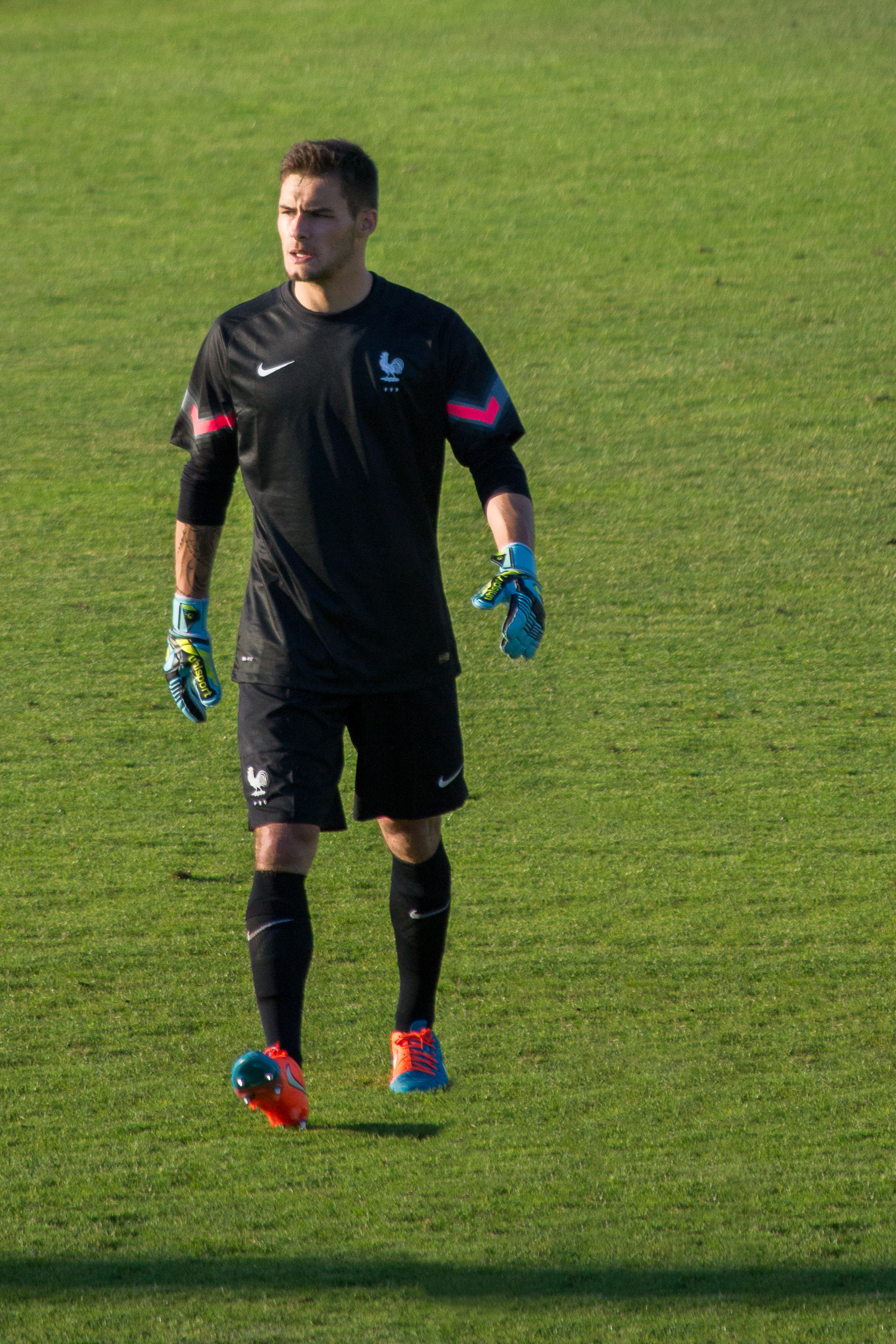
- Didillon with France U20 at 2015 Toulon Tournament

Personal information
- Date of birth: 28 November 1995 (age 30)
- Place of birth: Seclin, France
- Height: 1.93 m (6 ft 4 in)
- Position: Goalkeeper

Team information
- Current team: Willem II
- Number: 1

Youth career
- 2008–2013: Metz

Senior career*
Years	Team	Apps	(Gls)
2013–2018	Metz	68	(0)
2014–2015	→ Seraing (loan)	31	(0)
2018–2020	Anderlecht	41	(0)
2020	→ Genk (loan)	6	(0)
2020–2024	Cercle Brugge	59	(0)
2022–2023	→ Monaco (loan)	0	(0)
2024–	Willem II	60	(0)

International career^{‡}
2011	France U16	4	(0)
2012	France U18	1	(0)
2013	France U19	4	(0)
2015	France U20	5	(0)
2016	France U21	6	(0)
- * Club domestic league appearances and goals as of 18:24, 12 August 2026 (UTC) ‡ National team caps and goals as of 18 November 2016

Thomas Didillon-Hödl (born 28 November 1995) is a French professional footballer who plays as a goalkeeper for Eredivisie club Willem II.

== Club career ==
=== Metz ===
Didillon-Hödl is a youth exponent from Metz who signed with the first team in 2013. He made his Ligue 2 debut in Metz's title-winning season on 16 May 2014 against Laval in a 0–0 away draw.

After spending a year on loan to Seraing, Didillon-Hödl returned to Metz for the 2015–16 Ligue 2 season and helped the club re-gain promotion to Ligue 1.

On 13 August 2016, Didillon-Hödl made his Ligue 1 debut in a 3–2 victory against Lille. It was the club's first first division win since securing promotion. The following season, Didillon-Hödl lost his role as starting goalkeeper to Japan national team player, Eiji Kawashima.

==== Seraing (loan) ====
Didillon-Hödl made his league debut against Antwerp on 2 August 2014. During the 2014–15 season, he played 31 competitive games on loan for Belgian second division side Seraing, where he had moved alongside fellow Metz-players Saliu Popoola and Samy Kehli.

=== Anderlecht ===
After ten years with Metz, Didillon-Hödl signed with Belgian champions, Anderlecht of the First Division A in June 2018. Didillon-Hödl made his league debut against Kortrijk on 28 July 2018. On 20 September, he made his UEFA Europa League debut in a 1–0 loss against Slovak club, Spartak Trnava.

Didillon-Hödl quickly established himself as the starter in the Anderlecht goal: in his first season he did not miss a single league match and was only replaced by backup Frank Boeckx in the cup match against Union Saint-Gilloise and the final Europa League group match against Dinamo Zagreb. Didillon-Hödl was praised in the regular competition for his strong reflexes and leadership, and was even called a bright spot in an otherwise meagre season for Anderlecht. However, in the first two days of the play-offs he made mistakes against Genk and Club Brugge after bad footwork, which changed the perception around him.

During the 2019–20 pre-season, Didillon-Hödl made mistakes on return balls in the friendlies against Ajax and AZ. Because manager Vincent Kompany's system required a sweeper keeper and Didillon-Hödl's footwork was not considered good enough for that, Anderlecht started looking for a new goalkeeper in the summer of 2019. On the opening day against Oostende he was the starter in goal, but he was since replaced by Hendrik Van Crombrugge. From the second matchday, Didillon-Hödl alternated between the bench and reserves.

==== Genk (loan) ====
In January 2020, Didillon-Hödl was loaned by league rivals Genk until the end of the season with an option to purchase. Genk had a shortage of available goalkeepers at that time. He made his league debut against Sporting Charleroi on 1 February 2020. At the end of the season, the purchase option was not used and Didillon-Hödl returned to Anderlecht.

=== Cercle Brugge ===
In August 2020, Didillon-Hödl signed a four-year contract with Cercle Brugge. He made his league debut against Antwerp on 16 August 2020.

==== Monaco (loan) ====
On 20 July 2022, Didillon-Hödl joined Monaco on a season-long loan. He made his debut in a Coupe de France match against Rodez on 7 January 2023. He was mainly Alexander Nübel's backup in goal that season.

=== Willem II ===
In the summer of 2024, Didillon-Hödl signed a two-year contract with recently promoted Eredivisie club Willem II.

== International career ==
Didillon-Hödl has represented France at U16 through to U21 level. In 2015, Didillon-Hödl participated in the Toulon Tournament, leading France to a victory over Morocco in the final.

== Personal life ==
Didillon-Hödl is married to Julia Hödl, a professional volleyball player in the Netherlands when he signed with Dutch club Willem II in 2024. He added his wife's surname, Hödl, to his own upon their marriage.

== Career statistics ==
As of match played 8 August 2026

Appearances and goals by club, season and competition
Club	Season	League			National cup (Note: Includes Coupe de France, Belgian Cup)		League cup (Note: Includes Coupe de la Ligue)		Continental		Total	
Club	Season	Division	Apps	Goals	Apps	Goals	Apps	Goals	Apps	Goals	Apps	Goals
Metz	2013–14	Ligue 2	1	0	0	0	0	0	—		1	0
Metz	2015–16	Ligue 2	27	0	1	0	0	0	—		28	0
Metz	2016–17	Ligue 1	32	0	0	0	0	0	—		32	0
Metz	2017–18	Ligue 1	8	0	0	0	2	0	—		10	0
Metz	Total		68	0	1	0	2	0	—		71	0
RFC Seraing (loan)	2014–15	Belgian Second Division	31	0	0	0	—		—		31	0
Anderlecht	2018–19	Belgian Pro League	40	0	0	0	—		5 (Note: Includes appearances in UEFA Europa League)	0	45	0
Anderlecht	2019–20	Belgian Pro League	1	0	0	0	—		—		1	0
Anderlecht	Total		41	0	0	0	—		5	0	46	0
Genk (loan)	2019–20	Belgian Pro League	6	0	0	0	—		0	0	6	0
Cercle Brugge	2020–21	Belgian Pro League	30	0	0	0	—		—		30	0
Cercle Brugge	2021–22	Belgian Pro League	29	0	0	0	—		—		9	0
Cercle Brugge	2023–24	Belgian Pro League	0	0	0	0	—		—		0	0
Cercle Brugge	Total		59	0	0	0	—		—		59	0
Monaco (loan)	2022–23	Ligue 1	0	0	1	0	—		0	0	1	0
Willem II	2024–25	Eredivisie	24	0	0	0	—		4 (Note: Appearances in Eredivisie play-offs)	0	28	0
Willem II	2025–26	Eerste Divisie	35	0	2	0	—		6	0	43	0
Willem II	2026–27	Eredivisie	1	0	0	0	—		—		1	0
Willem II	Total		60	0	2	0	—		10	0	72	0
Career total			275	0	4	0	2	0	19	0	296	0

== Honours ==
Metz

- Ligue 2: 2013–14

Individual

- Eredivisie Player of the Month: October 2024
- Eredivisie Team of the Month: October 2024
