= Emilio Kehrer =

German footballer (born 2002)

Personal information
- Full name: Emilio Giuseppe Kehrer
- Date of birth: 20 March 2002 (age 24)
- Place of birth: Ravensburg, Germany
- Height: 1.77 m (5 ft 10 in)
- Position: Right winger

Team information
- Current team: Winterthur
- Number: 11

Youth career
- –2017: FV Ravensburg
- 2017–2020: SC Freiburg

Senior career*
Years	Team	Apps	(Gls)
2020–2022	SC Freiburg II	56	(15)
2022–2024	Cercle Brugge	15	(1)
2023–2024	→ Deinze (loan)	23	(6)
2024–2026	Willem II	31	(2)
2026	→ FC Ingolstadt (loan)	15	(0)
2026–	Winterthur	5	(3)

International career^{‡}
2019	Germany U18	1	(0)
2020	Germany U19	1	(0)
2021–2022	Germany U20	6	(2)
- * Club domestic league appearances and goals as of 28 September 2026 ‡ National team caps and goals as of 22 November 2022

Emilio Giuseppe Kehrer (born 20 March 2002) is a German professional footballer who plays as a right winger for Swiss Challenge League club Winterthur.

== Club career ==
=== SC Freiburg ===
Kehrer made his SC Freiburg II debut against Ulm on 9 January 2021. He scored his first league goal against VfB Stuttgart II on 16 January 2021, scoring in the 79th minute.

=== Cercle Brugge ===
Kehrer made his league debut against Standard Liège on 7 August 2022. Kehrer had covid and suffered two injuries during his beginning at Cercle. He scored his first league goal against Sporting Charleroi on 21 October 2022, scoring in the 90th minute.

==== Loan to Deinze ====
On 6 September 2023, Kehrer joined Deinze on loan. He made his league debut against Seraing on 17 September 2023. Kehrer scored his first league goal for Denize against Beerschot on 18 February 2024, scoring in the 94th minute.

=== Willem II ===
On 5 July 2024, Kehrer signed a three-year deal with Willem II in the Netherlands.

==== Loan to FC Ingolstadt ====
On 20 January 2026, he was loaned by FC Ingolstadt in 3. Liga.

== International career ==
Kehrer has represented Germany at youth international level.

== Career statistics ==
As of match played 13 December 2024

Appearances and goals by club, season and competition
Club	Season	League			National cup (Note: Includes Belgian Cup, KNVB Cup)		Total	
Club	Season	Division	Apps	Goals	Apps	Goals	Apps	Goals
SC Freiburg II	2020–21	Regionalliga	26	11	–		26	11
SC Freiburg II	2021–22	3. Liga	30	4	–		30	4
SC Freiburg II	Total		56	15	0	0	56	15
Cercle Brugge	2022–23	Belgian Pro League	11	1	2	0	13	1
Cercle Brugge	2023–24	Belgian Pro League	4	0	0	0	4	0
Cercle Brugge	Total		15	1	2	0	17	1
Deinze (loan)	2023–24	Challenger Pro League	23	6	1	0	24	6
Willem II	2024–25	Eredivisie	10	0	1	0	11	0
Career total			104	22	4	0	108	22
