= Miodrag Pivaš =

Serbian footballer

Personal information
- Date of birth: 17 May 2005 (age 21)
- Place of birth: Novi Sad, Serbia
- Height: 6 ft 2 in (1.88 m)
- Positions: Central defender; defensive midfielder

Team information
- Current team: Newcastle United

Youth career
- UFC Siezenheim
- Grödig

Senior career*
Years	Team	Apps	(Gls)
2021	Grödig II	3	(0)
2021–2023	Grödig	15	(0)
2023–2024	Jedinstvo Ub	25	(1)
2024–	Newcastle United	0	(0)
2024–2025	→ Willem II (loan)	5	(0)

International career
- Serbia U17
- * Club domestic league appearances and goals as of 19 May 2025

Miodrag Pivaš (Serbian Cyrillic: Миодраг Пиваш; born 17 May 2005) is a Serbian professional footballer who plays for English club Newcastle United, as a central defender and defensive midfielder.

== Early life ==
Born in Novi Sad, Pivaš's family moved to Austria when he was 12.

== Club career ==
Pivaš made his senior debut aged 16 for Austrian side Grödig, and at the age of 18 returned to Serbia without his family. During his time in Austria he also played for Grödig II. He won promotion to the Serbian Superliga in his sole season with Jedinstvo Ub.

In July 2024, Pivaš signed for English Premier League club Newcastle United. On 2 September 2024, he joined Eredivisie side Willem II on a season-long loan deal.

== International career ==
Pivaš is a Serbia youth international, playing for the under-17 team, including playing for them at the 2022 UEFA European Under-17 Championship.

== Playing style ==
Pivaš plays as both a central defender and a defensive midfielder.

Pivaš was compared by Ivan Radovanović, his manager at Jedinstvo Ub, to Branislav Ivanovic and Nemanja Vidic. Pivaš has said that he wants to follow in the footsteps of Ivanovic, Vidic, and Aleksandar Mitrovic. His mentality and smartness was also praised by Heimo Pfeifenberger, his manager at SV Grödig.
