= Raffael Behounek =

Austrian footballer (born 1997)

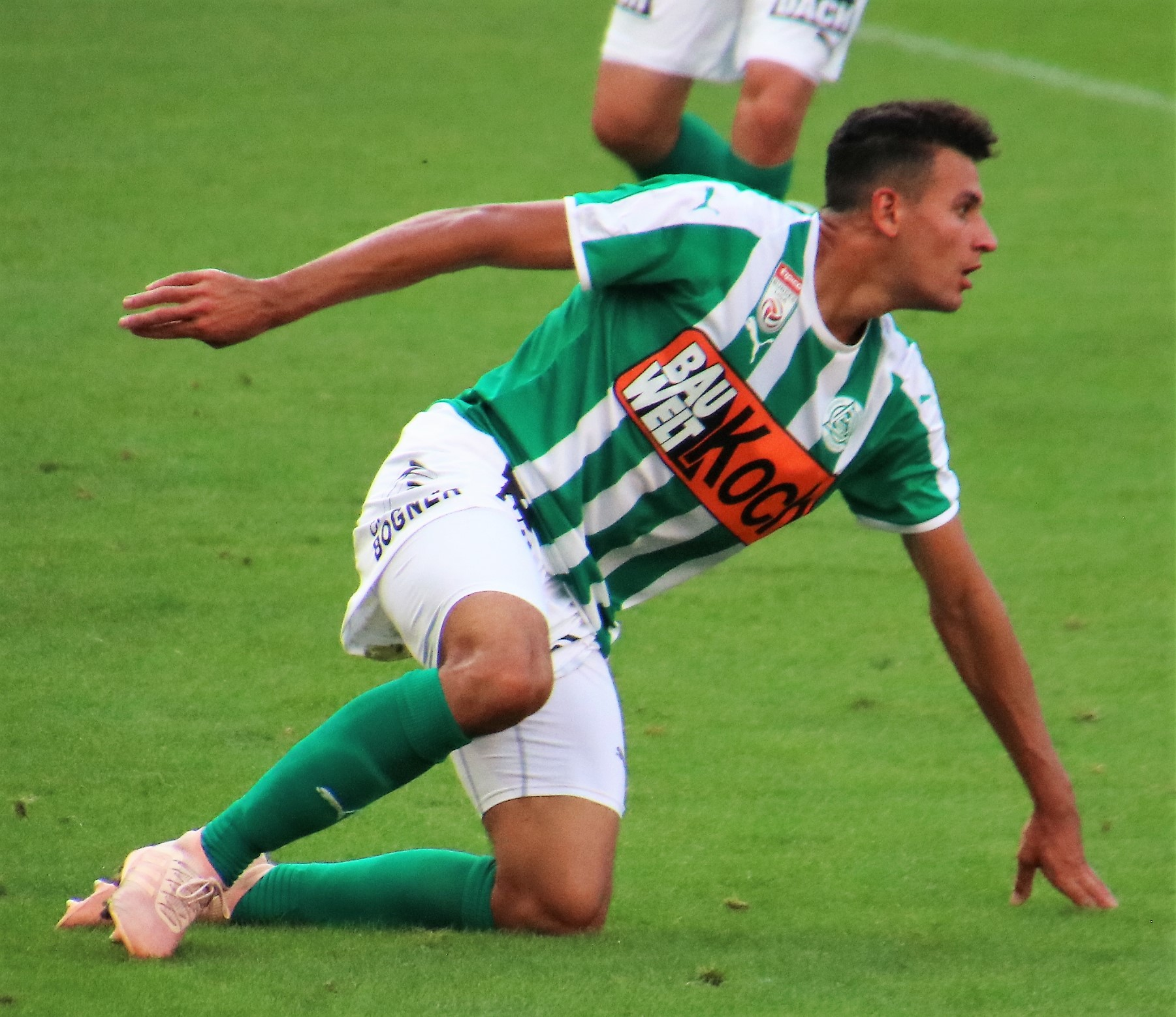

Personal information
- Date of birth: 16 April 1997 (age 29)
- Place of birth: Vienna, Austria
- Height: 1.87 m (6 ft 2 in)
- Position: Centre-back

Team information
- Current team: Wolfsberger AC
- Number: 6

Youth career
- 2003–2014: FC Stadlau

Senior career*
Years	Team	Apps	(Gls)
2014–2017	FC Stadlau	81	(4)
2017–2020	SV Mattersburg II	47	(2)
2018–2020	SV Mattersburg	6	(0)
2019	→ SV Horn (loan)	15	(0)
2020	Wacker Innsbruck	12	(0)
2020–2023	WSG Tirol	93	(4)
2023–2026	Willem II	104	(6)
2026–	Wolfsberger AC	1	(0)
- * Club domestic league appearances and goals as of 2 August 2026

Raffael Behounek (born 16 April 1997) is an Austrian professional footballer who plays as a centre-back for Austrian Bundesliga club Wolfsberger AC.

== Club career ==
On 19 August 2020, he signed with WSG Swarovski Tirol.

On 28 July 2023, Behounek signed a three-year contract with Willem II.

On 2 June 2026, Behounek returned to Austria and joined Wolfsberger AC on a three-season deal.

== Personal life ==
Born in Austria, Behounek is of Czech descent.
