= Rúnar Þór Sigurgeirsson =

Icelandic footballer (born 1999)

Personal information
- Date of birth: 28 December 1999 (age 26)
- Place of birth: Iceland
- Height: 1.86 m (6 ft 1 in)
- Position: Left-back

Team information
- Current team: Sønderjyske
- Number: 21

Youth career
- –2017: Keflavík

Senior career*
| Years | Team | Apps | (Gls) |
| 2017–2022 | Keflavík | 66 | (7) |
| 2023 | Öster | 16 | (1) |
| 2023–2025 | Willem II | 56 | (2) |
| 2025– | Sønderjyske | 3 | (0) |

International career^{‡}
| 2021– | Iceland | 2 | (0) |
- * Club domestic league appearances and goals as of 7 October 2025 ‡ National team caps and goals as of 15:25, 11 November 2022 (UTC)

Rúnar Þór Sigurgeirsson (born 28 December 1999) is an Icelandic footballer who plays as a left-back for Danish Superliga club Sønderjyske and the Iceland national team.

== Club career ==
On 28 August 2023, Rúnar signed a three-year contract with Willem II in the Netherlands.

On transfer deadline day, September 1, 2025, Sigurgeirsson transferred to the Danish Superliga club Sønderjyske on a deal until June 2029.

== International career ==
Rúnar Þór Sigurgeirsson made his international debut for Iceland on 29 May 2021 in a friendly match against Mexico in Arlington, Texas.

== Career statistics ==
=== International ===
As of 11 November 2022

Iceland
| Year | Apps | Goals |
|---|---|---|
| 2021 | 1 | 0 |
| 2022 | 1 | 0 |
| Total | 2 | 0 |
