= Thijs Oosting =

Dutch footballer

Personal information
- Date of birth: 2 May 2000 (age 26)
- Place of birth: Emmen, Netherlands
- Height: 1.76 m (5 ft 9 in)
- Position: Attacking midfielder

Team information
- Current team: PEC Zwolle
- Number: 25

Youth career
- –2011: VV Emmen
- 2011–2016: Emmen
- 2016–2022: AZ

Senior career*
Years	Team	Apps	(Gls)
2018–2022	Jong AZ	56	(17)
2020–2022	AZ	3	(0)
2021	→ RKC Waalwijk (loan)	17	(4)
2022–2024	Willem II	49	(15)
2024–2026	Groningen	22	(1)
2025–2026	→ PEC Zwolle (loan)	34	(6)
2026–	PEC Zwolle	9	(2)

International career
2017	Netherlands U17	9	(1)
2017–2018	Netherlands U18	5	(1)
- * Club domestic league appearances and goals as of 21:47, 21 October 2026 (UTC)

Thijs Oosting (born 2 May 2000) is a Dutch professional footballer who plays as an attacking midfielder for Eredivisie club PEC Zwolle.

== Club career ==
Oosting made his Eerste Divisie debut for Jong AZ on 17 November 2018, in a game against Jong PSV, as a 77th-minute substitute for Mees Kaandorp and scored his first professional goal 10 minutes later in an eventual 1–3 loss. He made his Eredivisie debut for the senior squad of AZ on 14 August 2021 against Waalwijk. He scored his first goal on 9 December 2021, the only goal of the game in a 1–0 UEFA Europa Conference League victory over the Danish side Randers.

On 31 January 2022, Oosting signed a contract with Willem II until the summer of 2026.

On 2 July 2024, Groningen announced the signing of Oosting on a three-year deal, with the option of an additional season. On 17 July 2025, he moved on loan to PEC Zwolle, with an option to buy.

== International career ==
Oosting was a starter for the Netherlands at the 2017 UEFA European Under-17 Championship, which saw them eliminated by Germany in the quarter-final.

== Personal life ==
His father Joseph Oosting was also a professional footballer and is now a coach. On 10 August 2025, Oosting scored the only goal in a 1–0 victory for his new team PEC Zwolle over his father's side FC Twente. This was the third goal he had scored against a team coached by his father.

== Career statistics ==
As of match played 18 October 2026

Appearances and goals by club, season and competition
Club	Season	League			KNVB Cup		Europe		Other		Total	
Club	Season	Division	Apps	Goals	Apps	Goals	Apps	Goals	Apps	Goals	Apps	Goals
Jong AZ	2018–19	Eerste Divisie	5	2	—		—		—		5	2
Jong AZ	2019–20	Eerste Divisie	28	8	—		—		—		28	8
Jong AZ	2020–21	Eerste Divisie	15	7	—		—		—		15	7
Jong AZ	2021–22	Eerste Divisie	9	0	—		—		—		9	0
Jong AZ	Total		57	17	—		—		—		57	17
Waalwijk (loan)	2020–21	Eredivisie	17	4	—		—		—		17	4
AZ Alkmaar	2021–22	Eredivisie	3	0	0	0	2 (Note: One appearance in UEFA Europa League, one appearance and one goal in UEFA Conference League)	1	—		5	1
Willem II	2021–22	Eredivisie	3	2	—		—		—		3	2
Willem II	2022–23	Eerste Divisie	12	1	0	0	—		2 (Note: Appearance(s) in promotion/relegation play-offs)	0	14	1
Willem II	2023–24	Eerste Divisie	34	12	0	0	—		—		34	12
Willem II	Total		49	15	0	0	—		2	0	51	3
Groningen	2024–25	Eredivisie	22	1	2	3	—		—		24	4
PEC Zwolle (loan)	2025–26	Eredivisie	34	6	2	2	—		—		36	8
PEC Zwolle	2026–27	Eredivisie	9	2	0	0	—		—		9	2
PEC Zwolle	PEC Zwolle total		43	8	2	2	—		—		45	10
Career total			191	45	4	5	2	1	2	0	199	51

== Honours ==
Willem II

- Eerste Divisie: 2023–24
