= Tommy St. Jago =

Dutch footballer (born 2000)

Personal information
- Full name: Tommy Luciano St. Jago
- Date of birth: 3 January 2000 (age 26)
- Place of birth: Utrecht, Netherlands
- Height: 1.89 m (6 ft 2 in)
- Position: Centre back

Team information
- Current team: Mechelen
- Number: 33

Youth career
- DVSU
- 2008–2011: Ajax
- 2011–2018: Utrecht

Senior career*
Years	Team	Apps	(Gls)
2018–2023	Jong Utrecht	41	(2)
2019–2023	Utrecht	25	(0)
2023–2025	Willem II	57	(2)
2025–	Mechelen	28	(0)

International career^{‡}
2016–2017	Netherlands U17	9	(0)
2017	Netherlands U18	5	(0)
- * Club domestic league appearances and goals as of 31 May 2026 ‡ National team caps and goals as of 13 November 2017

Tommy Luciano St. Jago (born 3 January 2000) is a Dutch professional footballer who plays as a centre back for Belgian Pro League club Mechelen.

== Club career ==
He made his Eerste Divisie debut for Jong FC Utrecht on 1 April 2019 in a game against Roda JC Kerkrade, as an 8th-minute substitute for Redouan El Yaakoubi.

On 1 September 2023, St. Jago signed a two-year contract with Willem II.

On 18 June 2025, St. Jago moved to Mechelen in Belgium on a three-year contract.

== International career ==
Born in the Netherlands, St. Jago is of Indonesian, Dutch and Curaçao descent. He is a youth international for the Netherlands.
