= Pol Llonch =

Spanish footballer (born 1992)

Personal information
- Full name: Pol Llonch Puyaltó
- Date of birth: 7 October 1992 (age 34)
- Place of birth: Barcelona, Spain
- Height: 1.70 m (5 ft 7 in)
- Position: Midfielder

Team information
- Current team: Helmond Sport
- Number: 8

Youth career
- Europa
- 2009–2011: Hospitalet

Senior career*
Years	Team	Apps	(Gls)
2011–2014	Hospitalet	79	(2)
2014–2015	Espanyol B	35	(0)
2015–2017	Girona	11	(0)
2016–2017	→ Granada B (loan)	21	(2)
2017–2018	Wisła Kraków	41	(0)
2018–2023	Willem II	133	(4)
2023–2024	Ponferradina	20	(2)
2024–2025	Intercity	32	(1)
2025–	Helmond Sport	34	(2)
- * Club domestic league appearances and goals as of 16:16, 18 October 2026 (UTC)

Pol Llonch Puyaltó (born 7 October 1992) is a Spanish professional footballer who plays as a midfielder for Eerste Divisie club Helmond Sport.

== Club career ==
Born in Barcelona, Catalonia, Llonch finished his youth career with CE L'Hospitalet after starting out at CE Europa. He made his senior debut with the former club in the 2011–12 season, in the Segunda División B.

Llonch moved to RCD Espanyol on 30 June 2014, being assigned to the reserves also in the third tier. He also trained with the first team in February, mainly to cover for injuries of José Cañas and Abraham.

On 3 August 2015, Llonch signed a two-year deal with Segunda División side Girona FC. He made his professional debut on 9 September, starting in a 2–2 away draw against Gimnàstic de Tarragona in the second round of the Copa del Rey (5–4 loss on penalties). His maiden league appearance took place ten days later, in a 2–1 win at Real Oviedo where he came on as a late substitute.

Llonch was loaned to Club Recreativo Granada of the third division on 11 July 2016, for one year. The following 31 January, he terminated his contract with Girona and immediately joined Wisła Kraków.

After one season in the Ekstraklasa, Llonch moved countries again, signing a three-year deal at Willem II Tilburg in the Netherlands. He scored his first professional goal on 20 January 2019 to open a 2–0 home victory in the Eredivisie over North Brabant rivals NAC Breda, and played six games in a run to the final of the KNVB Cup which was lost 4–0 to AFC Ajax.

In September 2020, Llonch extended his contract until 2024. A year later – despite not being fluent in the national language – he was made captain when veteran Jordens Peters retired through injury.

Llonch returned to Spain on 5 August 2023, on a contract at Primera Federación club SD Ponferradina. He remained in the league for the 2024–25 campaign, signing for Alicante-based CF Intercity.

On 6 July 2025, Llonch went back to the Netherlands, joining Eerste Divisie side Helmond Sport.

== Career statistics ==
As of match played on 2 October 2026

Appearances and goals by club, season and competition
Club	Season	League			National cup (Note: Includes Copa del Rey, Polish Cup, KNVB Cup)		Europe		Other		Total	
Club	Season	Division	Apps	Goals	Apps	Goals	Apps	Goals	Apps	Goals	Apps	Goals
Hospitalet	2011–12	Segunda División B	18	0	3	0	—		—		21	0
Hospitalet	2012–13	Segunda División B	27	1	1	0	—		6 (Note: Appearances in Segunda División B play-offs)	0	34	1
Hospitalet	2013–14	Segunda División B	34	1	0	0	—		6	1	40	2
Hospitalet	Total		79	2	4	0	0	0	12	1	95	3
Espanyol B	2014–15	Segunda División B	35	0	—		—		—		35	0
Girona	2015–16	Segunda División	11	0	1	0	—		—		12	0
Granada B (loan)	2016–17	Segunda División B	21	2	—		—		—		21	2
Wisła Kraków	2016–17	Ekstraklasa	16	0	0	0	—		—		16	0
Wisła Kraków	2017–18	Ekstraklasa	25	0	2	0	—		—		27	0
Wisła Kraków	Total		41	0	2	0	0	0	0	0	43	0
Willem II	2018–19	Eredivisie	30	1	6	0	—		—		36	1
Willem II	2019–20	Eredivisie	24	2	2	0	—		—		26	2
Willem II	2020–21	Eredivisie	27	0	0	0	2 (Note: Appearances in UEFA Europa League)	0	—		29	0
Willem II	2021–22	Eredivisie	25	0	1	0	—		—		26	0
Willem II	2022–23	Eerste Divisie	27	1	1	0	—		2 (Note: Appearances in Eredivisie relegation play-offs)	0	26	0
Willem II	Total		133	4	10	0	2	0	2	0	147	4
Ponferradina	2023–24	Primera Federación	20	2	1	0	—		0	0	21	2
Intercity	2024–25	Primera Federación	32	1	0	0	—		—		21	2
Helmond Sport	2025–26	Eerste Divisie	27	2	1	0	—		—		28	2
Helmond Sport	2026–27	Eerste Divisie	7	0	0	0	—		—		7	0
Helmond Sport	Total		34	2	1	0	—		—		35	2
Career totals			406	7	19	0	2	0	14	1	441	8
