= Jizz Hornkamp =

Dutch footballer (born 1998)

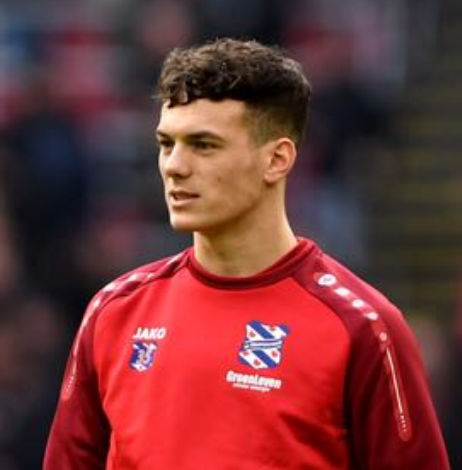
- Hornkamp with SC Heerenveen in 2018

Personal information
- Date of birth: 7 March 1998 (age 28)
- Place of birth: De Rijp, North Holland, Netherlands
- Height: 1.82 m (6 ft 0 in)
- Position: Striker

Team information
- Current team: AZ
- Number: 19

Youth career
- 2004–2006: SV De Rijp
- 2006–2014: Ajax
- 2014–2015: AZ
- 2015–2018: Heerenveen

Senior career*
Years	Team	Apps	(Gls)
2018–2019	Heerenveen	20	(2)
2019–2022	Den Bosch	52	(25)
2022–2023	Willem II	45	(13)
2023–2026	Heracles Almelo	57	(28)
2026–	AZ	11	(2)
- * Club domestic league appearances and goals as of 19:31, 20 September 2026 (UTC)

Jizz Hornkamp (born 7 March 1998) is a Dutch professional footballer who plays as a forward for Eredivisie club AZ.

== Career ==
=== Heerenveen ===
Born in De Rijp, North Holland, Hornkamp played in the youth sides of SV De Rijp, Ajax, AZ and SC Heerenveen. In the 2017–18 season, Hornkamp became part of the first-team squad of Heerenveen, making his debut for the club in the playoffs for the UEFA Europa League on 9 May 2018, a home match against FC Utrecht, which was won 4–3. He came on as a substitute for Reza Ghoochannejhad in the 88th minute. He scored his first goal as an injury time substitute on 22 September 2018, the equaliser, against Excelsior. After the winter break of the 2018–19 season, the Heerenveen coaching staff decided to utilise him as a right back, due numerous injuries in defence.

=== Den Bosch ===
In July 2019, it was announced that Hornkamp had joined second-tier Eerste Divisie club FC Den Bosch on a three-year contract. There, he stated that he wanted to prove himself as a striker after having mostly been used as a reserve right back in the season before at Heerenveen. He made his debut for the club as a starter on 12 August 2020 in a 2–2 away draw against Jong PSV.

In the 2020–21 season, Hornkamp grew into a proven goalscorer. His first goal for the club came on 31 August 2020 in a 4–2 away loss against De Graafschap – a header after an assist provided by Don Bolsius in the 80th minute. After having scored four goals during the first half of the season, his goalscoring took off in the spring. On 30 January 2021, Hornkamp scored four goals in a span of 30 minutes to secure a 4–4 away draw against Excelsior. He also scored braces against Go Ahead Eagles, Dordrecht and Roda JC Kerkrade, to finish the season with 20 goals in 35 appearances.

=== Willem II ===
On 24 January 2022, Hornkamp signed with Willem II until the summer of 2024. He made his competitive debut for the club on 6 February, also scoring his first goal as RKC Waalwijk were beaten 3–1.

=== Heracles ===
Hornkamp joined newly promoted Eredivisie side Heracles on 3 July 2023, signing a contract running until the summer of 2026. He made his competitive debut for the club on 12 August 2023, starting in the opening fixture of the 2023–24 season against Ajax, which ended in a 4–1 defeat. Shortly before half-time, Hornkamp suffered an ankle injury that required surgery, ruling him out for several months.

Hornkamp returned to action on 12 January 2024, coming on as a substitute for Emil Hansson during the second half of a 2–1 league victory over RKC Waalwijk. One week later, he scored his first goal for the club, netting the equaliser in a 1–1 draw against Volendam. He went on to score in several consecutive league matches, including two headed goals in a 3–2 comeback victory over Vitesse on 10 February 2024.

During the first half of the 2025–26 season, Hornkamp was Heracles Almelo's leading goalscorer, scoring ten goals in fourteen league appearances. He completed his spell at the club with a total of 29 goals in 62 appearances across all competitions.

=== AZ ===
On 2 January 2026, AZ announced the signing of Hornkamp on a four-and-a-half-year contract, set to run until June 2030. At the time of his signing, Hornkamp was Heracles Almelo's leading goalscorer, with the club stating that the transfer fee represented a record sale in its history. He joined AZ to strengthen the club's attacking options, where he faced competition from forwards including Troy Parrott, while Mexx Meerdink was sidelined with injury at the time of his arrival.

== Career statistics ==
As of match played 20 September 2026

Appearances and goals by club, season and competition
Club	Season	League			KNVB Cup		Europe		Other		Total	
Club	Season	Division	Apps	Goals	Apps	Goals	Apps	Goals	Apps	Goals	Apps	Goals
SC Heerenveen	2017–18	Eredivisie	2	0	0	0	—		—		2	0
SC Heerenveen	2018–19	Eredivisie	18	2	1	0	—		—		19	2
SC Heerenveen	Total		20	2	1	0	—		—		21	2
FC Den Bosch	2019–20	Eerste Divisie	1	0	0	0	—		—		1	0
FC Den Bosch	2020–21	Eerste Divisie	34	20	1	0	—		—		35	20
FC Den Bosch	2021–22	Eerste Divisie	18	5	0	0	—		—		18	5
FC Den Bosch	Total		54	25	1	0	—		—		55	25
Willem II	2021–22	Eredivisie	13	4	0	0	—		—		13	4
Willem II	2022–23	Eerste Divisie	32	9	1	0	—		2 (Note: Appearances in Eredivisie promotion/relegation playoffs)	2	35	11
Willem II	Total		45	13	1	0	—		2	2	48	15
Heracles Almelo	2023–24	Eredivisie	17	10	—		—		—		17	10
Heracles Almelo	2024–25	Eredivisie	26	8	4	0	—		—		30	8
Heracles Almelo	2025–26	Eredivisie	14	10	1	1	—		—		15	11
Heracles Almelo	Total		57	28	5	1	—		—		62	29
AZ	2025–26	Eredivisie	8	0	1	0	0	0	—		9	0
AZ	2026–27	Eredivisie	3	2	0	0	1 (Note: Appearances in UEFA Europa League)	0	—		4	2
AZ	Total		11	2	1	0	1	0	—		13	2
Career total			186	70	9	1	1	0	2	2	206	73

== Honours ==
Individual

- Eredivisie Team of the Month: March 2025
