= Dani Mathieu =

Dutch association football player (born 2001)

Personal information
- Date of birth: 9 February 2001 (age 25)
- Place of birth: Tilburg, Netherlands
- Height: 1.76 m (5 ft 9 in)
- Position: Midfielder

Youth career
- –2022: PSV Eindhoven

Senior career*
Years	Team	Apps	(Gls)
2022–2026	Willem II	16	(1)
- * Club domestic league appearances and goals as of 24 April 2026

Dani Mathieu (born 9 February 2001) is a Dutch professional footballer who plays as a midfielder.

== Career ==
Born in Tilburg, he plays as a central midfielder. He was in the youth academy at PSV Eindhoven. He signed for Willem II in July 2022, agreeing a two-year contract. During the 2022–23 season he suffered a concussion which ruled him out of action for a number of weeks. He scored his first league goal for Willem II in a 3–0 win in the Eerste Divisie on 6 February 2023 against FC Eindhoven.

In September 2024, he suffered a knee injury which required surgery and ruled him out of the rest of Willem II's Eredivisie 2024–25 campaign.

== Personal life ==
He is of Indonesian descent. He is the brother of footballer Justin Mathieu.
