= Nick Doodeman =

Dutch footballer (born 1996)

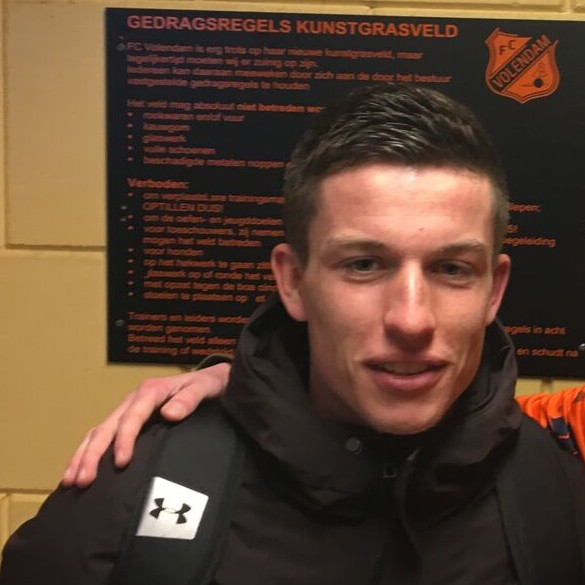

Personal information
- Date of birth: 22 October 1996 (age 30)
- Place of birth: Venhuizen, Netherlands
- Height: 1.73 m (5 ft 8 in)
- Position: Winger

Team information
- Current team: Volendam
- Number: 7

Youth career
- ASV '55
- –2007: VV De Zouaven
- 2007–2016: AZ

Senior career*
Years	Team	Apps	(Gls)
2016–2017	Jong AZ	21	(6)
2017	Jong Volendam	3	(1)
2017–2021	Volendam	122	(26)
2021–2022	Cambuur	28	(1)
2022–2026	Willem II	110	(11)
2026–	Volendam	16	(2)

International career
2013	Netherlands U17	1	(0)
2013	Netherlands U18	1	(0)
- * Club domestic league appearances and goals as of 15:40, 21 November 2026 (UTC)

Nick Doodeman (born 22 October 1996) is a Dutch professional footballer who plays as a winger for Eerste Divisie club Volendam.

== Club career ==
He made his Eerste Divisie debut for FC Volendam on 3 September 2017 in a game against SC Cambuur.

On 27 January 2021, it was announced that he will exchange FC Volendam for SC Cambuur for the next season. He has signed with SC Cambuur for two years.

Monday, 1 February 2021, it was announced that Nick will make the switch from FC Volendam to SC Cambuur immediately in the 2020–2021 season.

On 21 June 2022, Doodeman signed a three-year contract with Willem II who had recently been relegated from the Eredivisie.

On 24 June 2026, Doodeman returned to recently relegated Eerste Divisie side Volendam on a three-year deal.

== International career ==
Doodeman played once for the Netherlands national under-17 football team and once for the U18s.

== Honours ==
Individual

- Volendam Player of the Year: 2018–19
