= Erik Schouten =

Dutch footballer (born 1991)

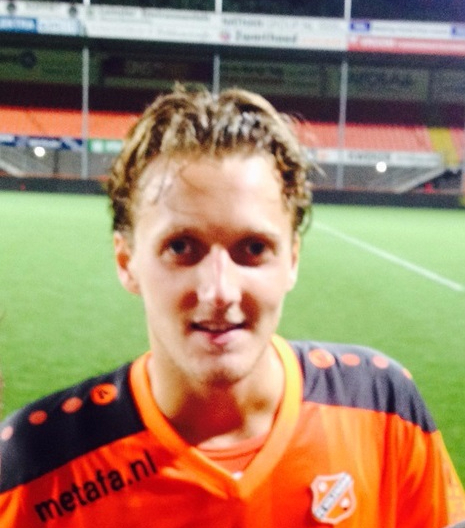

Personal information
- Date of birth: 16 August 1991 (age 35)
- Place of birth: Westwoud, Netherlands
- Height: 1.82 m (6 ft 0 in)
- Position: Centre-back

Team information
- Current team: Volendam
- Number: 4

Youth career
- AZ

Senior career*
Years	Team	Apps	(Gls)
2012–2019	Volendam	142	(7)
2019–2022	Cambuur	87	(7)
2022–2025	Willem II	89	(3)
2025–2026	Terrassa	24	(0)
2026–	Volendam	0	(0)
- * Club domestic league appearances and goals as of 15 May 2026

Erik Schouten (born 16 August 1991) is a Dutch professional footballer who plays as a centre-back for Eerste Divisie club Volendam.

== Career ==
On 12 July 2019 it was confirmed, that Schouten had joined SC Cambuur on a two-year contract.

Schouten joined Willem II on 13 June 2022, signing a three-year contract.

== Honours ==
Individual

- Eredivisie Team of the Month: December 2024
