= Jelte Pal =

Dutch footballer

Personal information
- Date of birth: 16 October 2002 (age 24)
- Place of birth: Roosendaal, Netherlands
- Position: Forward

Team information
- Current team: RBC Roosendaal
- Number: 12

Youth career
- 2010–2012: BSC Roosendaal
- 2012–2020: RBC
- 2019–2022: Willem II

Senior career*
| Years | Team | Apps | (Gls) |
| 2022–2023 | Willem II | 2 | (0) |
| 2023– | RBC | | |
- * Club domestic league appearances and goals as of 17:37, 10 April 2022 (UTC)

Jelte Pal (born 16 October 2002) is a Dutch footballer who plays as a forward for Derde Divisie club RBC.

== Career ==
Pal was a youth product of BSC Roosendaal and -RBC, before moving to the youth academy of Willem II in 2019. He made his professional debut with Willem II in a 4–2 Eredivisie loss to PSV on 1 May 2022, coming on as a late sub in the 87th minute.

== Personal life ==
Pal was born in the Netherlands to an Indonesian father and a Dutch mother.
