= Matthias Verreth =

Belgian footballer (born 1998)

Personal information
- Date of birth: 20 February 1998 (age 28)
- Place of birth: Morkhoven, Belgium
- Height: 1.81 m (5 ft 11 in)
- Positions: Defensive midfielder; centre-back

Team information
- Current team: Dinamo București
- Number: 6

Youth career
- 2004–2007: Lierse
- 2007–2017: PSV

Senior career*
Years	Team	Apps	(Gls)
2016–2019	Jong PSV	81	(16)
2018–2019	PSV	1	(0)
2019–2022	Waasland-Beveren	30	(1)
2021	→ Kolding (loan)	14	(1)
2022	FC Eindhoven	17	(0)
2022–2024	Willem II	70	(5)
2024–2025	Brescia	32	(4)
2025–2026	Bari	26	(2)
2026–	Dinamo București	9	(0)

International career
2013	Belgium U15	3	(1)
2013–2015	Belgium U17	33	(6)
2015	Belgium U18	2	(0)
2016–2017	Belgium U19	8	(4)
2019	Belgium U21	1	(0)
Medal record
Men's football
Representing Belgium
FIFA U-17 World Cup
Bronze medal – third place	2015 Chile
- * Club domestic league appearances and goals as of 6 November 2026

Matthias Verreth (born 20 February 1998) is a Belgian professional footballer who plays as a defensive midfielder or a centre-back for Liga I club Dinamo București.

== Club career ==
Verreth made his professional debut as Jong PSV player in the second division on 26 February 2016 against Achilles '29. He played the full game. On 27 October 2018, Verreth made his debut in PSV's first team.

On 23 July 2019, he returned to Belgium, signing a 3-year contract with Waasland-Beveren. On 1 February 2021, Verreth joined Danish 1st Division club Kolding IF on loan for the rest of the season.

On 9 January 2022, Verreth signed with FC Eindhoven back in the Netherlands until the end of the season.

On 2 July 2022, he joined fellow Eerste Divisie club Willem II on a two-year deal.

On 24 June 2024, Willem II announced that they had reached an agreement for the permanent transfer of Verreth to Serie B side Brescia. The deal was made official on 1 July, as the player signed a two-year contract with the Italian club.

On 16 July 2025, Verreth moved to Bari on a three-year contract.

== Career statistics ==
As of 6 November 2026

Appearances and goals by club, season and competition
Club	Season	League			National Cup (Note: Includes KNVB Beker, Belgian Cup, Coppa Italia, Cupa României)		Europe		Other		Total	
Club	Season	Division	Apps	Goals	Apps	Goals	Apps	Goals	Apps	Goals	Apps	Goals
Jong PSV	2015–16	Eerste Divisie	1	0	—		—		—		1	0
Jong PSV	2016–17	Eerste Divisie	20	2	—		—		—		20	2
Jong PSV	2017–18	Eerste Divisie	29	7	—		—		—		29	7
Jong PSV	2018–19	Eerste Divisie	31	7	—		—		—		31	7
Jong PSV	Total		81	16	—		—		—		81	16
PSV	2018–19	Eredivisie	1	0	2	0	0	0	—		3	0
Waasland-Beveren	2019–20	Belgian First Division A	18	1	1	0	—		—		19	1
Waasland-Beveren	2020–21	Belgian First Division A	4	0	1	0	—		—		5	0
Waasland-Beveren	2021–22	Belgian First Division B	8	0	1	0	—		—		9	0
Waasland-Beveren	Total		30	1	3	0	—		—		33	1
Kolding (loan)	2020–21	Danish 1st Division	14	1	—		—		—		14	1
FC Eindhoven	2021–22	Eerste Divisie	17	0	—		—		3 (Note: Appearances in Eredivisie promotion/relegation play-offs)	0	20	0
Willem II	2022–23	Eerste Divisie	34	4	0	0	—		1	0	35	4
Willem II	2023–24	Eerste Divisie	36	1	2	0	—		—		38	1
Willem II	Total		70	5	2	0	—		1	0	73	5
Brescia	2024–25	Serie B	32	4	2	0	—		—		34	4
Bari	2025–26	Serie B	26	2	1	0	—		1 (Note: Appearance in Serie B relegation play-out)	0	28	2
Dinamo București	2026–27	Liga I	9	0	2	0	—		—		11	0
Career total			280	29	12	0	0	0	5	0	297	29

== Honours ==
Willem II

- Eerste Divisie: 2023–24

Belgium U17

- FIFA U-17 World Cup third place: 2015
