= Jesse Bosch =

Dutch footballer (born 2000)

Personal information
- Full name: Jesse Bosch
- Date of birth: 1 February 2000 (age 26)
- Place of birth: De Lutte, Netherlands
- Height: 1.76 m (5 ft 9 in)
- Position: Midfielder

Team information
- Current team: GKS Katowice
- Number: 5

Youth career
- SV De Lutte
- 2010–2019: Twente

Senior career*
Years	Team	Apps	(Gls)
2018	Jong Twente	12	(0)
2019–2022	Twente	62	(3)
2022–2025	Willem II	100	(14)
2025–	GKS Katowice	11	(0)
- * Club domestic league appearances and goals as of 10:11, 30 May 2026 (UTC)

Jesse Bosch (born 1 February 2000) is a Dutch professional footballer who plays as a midfielder for Ekstraklasa club GKS Katowice.

== Club career ==
=== Twente ===
Born in De Lutte, Bosch played as a youth player for hometown club SV De Lutte before moving to the FC Twente where he progressed through the youth system. On 26 May 2018, he made his first appearance for the reserve team, Jong FC Twente, in the Derde Divisie in a 1–3 win over ODIN '59. After this, Jong FC Twente was removed from the Dutch football league system as the first team had suffered relegation from the top-tier Eredivisie, and Bosch played for the reserve team in the Beloften Eredivisie instead. In 2019, he was officially promoted from the U19 squad to Jong FC Twente.

In the 2019–20 season, he became a regular part of the first team of Twente. He made his professional debut on 30 October 2019, in a 0–2 KNVB Cup win over De Treffers. Bosch came on as a substitute for Lindon Selahi in the 63rd minute. During a training camp in the winter break, he made a strong impression on head coach Gonzalo García García, who gave him a spot in the starting lineup in the next match, at home against FC Groningen on 18 January 2020.

=== Willem II ===
On 28 July 2022, Bosch signed a two-year contract with Willem II.

In his second season, Bosch played a crucial role in Willem II's title-winning campaign, appearing in nearly every match and scoring several key goals, including a long-range strike against ADO Den Haag that helped secure promotion to the Eredivisie.

=== GKS Katowice ===
On 14 August 2025, Bosch joined Polish Ekstraklasa club GKS Katowice on a three-year contract.

== Honours ==
Willem II

- Eerste Divisie: 2023–24
