= Freek Heerkens =

Dutch footballer (born 1989)

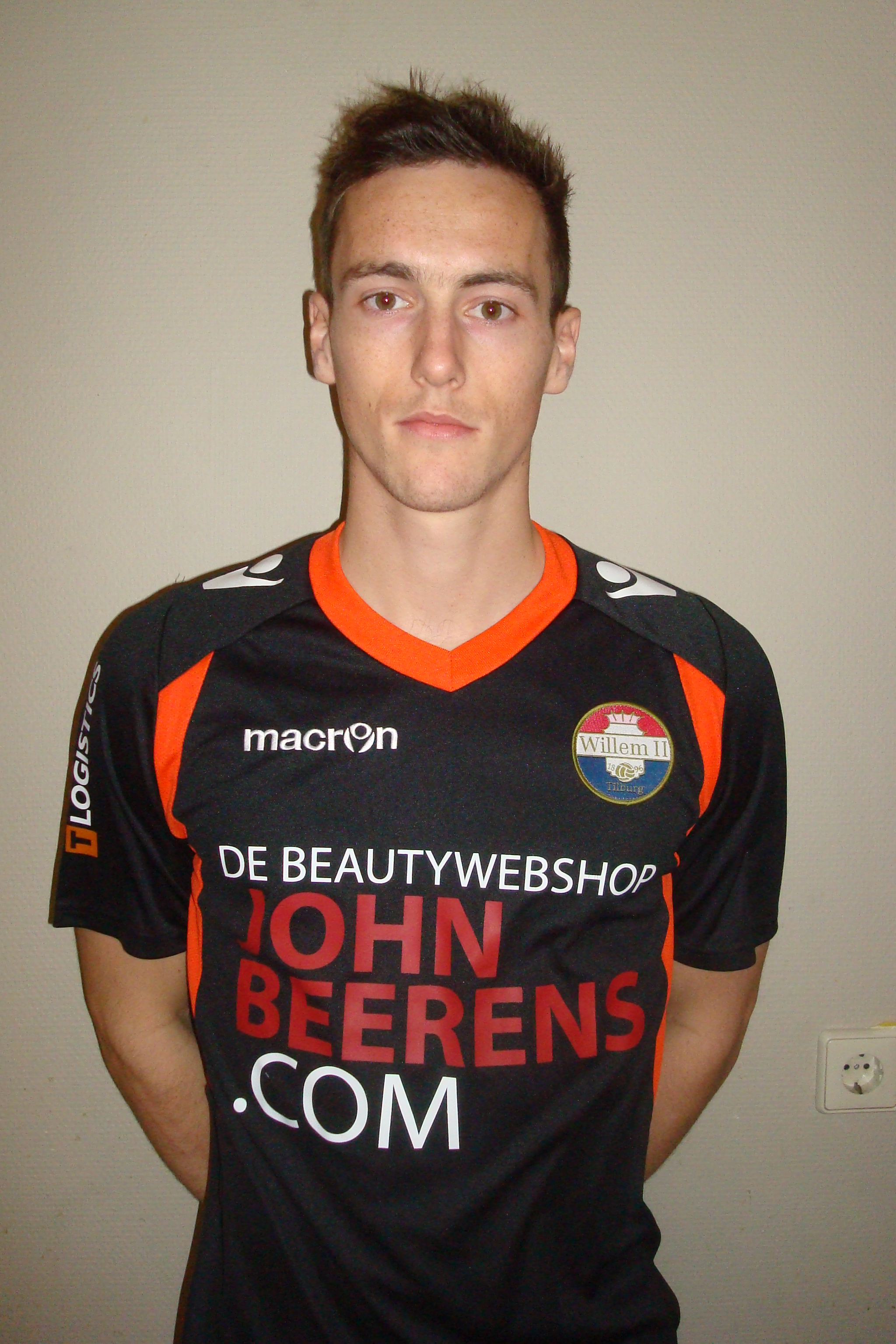
- Heerkens with Willem II in 2013

Personal information
- Date of birth: 13 September 1989 (age 37)
- Place of birth: Heeswijk-Dinther, Netherlands
- Height: 1.84 m (6 ft 0 in)
- Position: Centre-back

Youth career
- VV Heeswijk
- PSV

Senior career*
Years	Team	Apps	(Gls)
2010–2013	Go Ahead Eagles	75	(8)
2013–2024	Willem II	220	(8)
- * Club domestic league appearances and goals

Freek Heerkens (born 13 September 1989) is a Dutch former professional footballer who played as a centre-back.

== Career ==
=== Early years ===
After progressing through PSV' youth teams, Heerkens moved to Go Ahead Eagles in 2010. He made his professional debut for their first team on 16 August 2010, starting in a home match against Sparta Rotterdam. Just a few months later, on 1 October of the same year, he notched his first goal in professional football during an impressive 8–0 victory against Dordrecht.

=== Go Ahead Eagles ===
Following three successful seasons with the club from Deventer, Heerkens joined Willem II, signing a two-year contract on 13 June 2013. He made his debut for the Tricolores in a home match against Den Bosch on 4 August 2013, starting in a 2–2 draw. Throughout the 2013–14 season, he made 28 league appearances as the club clinched the Eerste Divisie title and secured promotion to the Eredivisie.

Heerkens grew into team captain of Willem II, replacing Pol Llonch and Jordens Peters in that position. In September 2018, he extended his contract with Willem II until 2021. In June 2021, he signed a one-year extension, keeping him in Tilburg until 2022.

On 7 May 2022, Heerkens celebrated his 200th appearance for Willem II in a 2–0 victory against Heracles Almelo. However, the season concluded with the club facing their relegation to the Eerste Divisie after Heerkens led the club to promotion eight years prior. Despite relegation, he signed another one-year deal, extending his expiring contract until 2023. In June 2023, he signed a third consecutive one-year contract extension, keeping him part of Willem II for his eleventh season.

== Honours ==
Willem II

- Eerste Divisie: 2013–14
