= Koning Willem II Stadion =

Football stadium in Tilburg, the Netherlands

Coordinates: 51°32′34″N 5°04′01″E

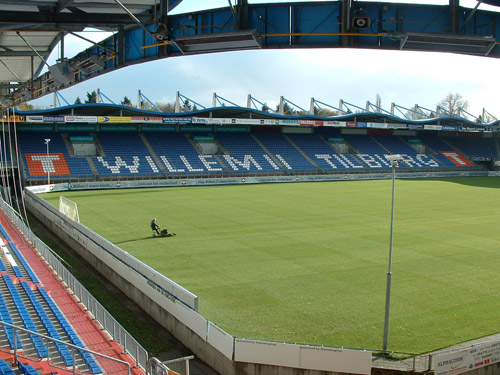
- Interactive map of Koning Willem II Stadion
- Full name: Koning Willem II Stadion
- Former names: Willem II Stadion (1995–2009); Koning Willem II Stadion (2009–present)
- Location: Goirleseweg 34, 5026 PC Tilburg; Netherlands
- Capacity: 15,220

Construction
- Opened: 31 May 1995

Tenant
- Willem II

Koning Willem II Stadion (Dutch pronunciation: [ˌkoːnɪŋ ˌʋɪləm ˈtʋeː ˌstaːdijɔn]) is a multi-purpose stadium in Tilburg, Netherlands, and the home ground of Willem II. It is currently used mostly for football matches. The stadium is able to hold 15,220 people, was built in 1995 and renovated in 2000 to add business lodges, a restaurant, conference rooms, a business club and a supporters bar to the main building.

The new stadium is built on the same spot as the old stadium, the Gemeentelijk Sportpark Tilburg, which had a smaller capacity and fewer facilities. This stadium was demolished in 1992. The current stadium opened in 1995. Willem II have been tenants of the stadium since 1995.

The original name was Willem II Stadion, but in 2009 the stadium was renamed Koning ("King") Willem II Stadion, honouring William II of the Netherlands.

== See also ==
- List of football stadiums in the Netherlands
- Lists of stadiums
