= Max Svensson (footballer, born 1998) =

Swedish footballer

Personal information
- Full name: Max Johan Erik Svensson
- Date of birth: 19 June 1998 (age 28)
- Height: 1.76 m (5 ft 9 in)
- Position: Winger

Team information
- Current team: Helsingborgs IF
- Number: 10

Youth career
- –2006: Teckomatorps SK
- 2006–2009: Häljarps IF
- 2010–2015: Helsingborgs IF

Senior career*
Years	Team	Apps	(Gls)
2016–2021	Helsingborgs IF	124	(26)
2021–2024	Willem II	95	(12)
2024	Kalmar FF	13	(0)
2025–	Helsingborgs IF	52	(5)

International career
2016–2018	Sweden U19	8	(0)
2019–2020	Sweden U21	4	(1)
- * Club domestic league appearances and goals as of 12 November 2026

Max Svensson (born 19 June 1998) is a Swedish footballer who plays for Helsingborgs IF. He is mainly a left winger.

== Club career ==
He made his Allsvenskan debut for Helsingborgs IF on 16 July 2016 in a game against GIF Sundsvall. He moved to Willem II in July 2021 on a three-year contract.

On 4 July 2024, Svensson signed with Kalmar FF. He left already at the end of the season, and instead re-joined his former club, Helsingborgs IF, ahead of the 2025 season.
