= 2024–25 KNVB Cup =

Dutch football tournament season

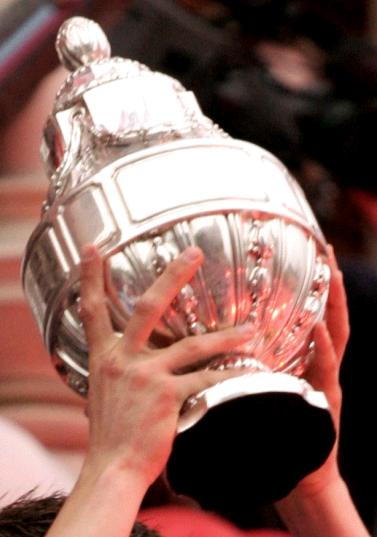
- KNVB Cup trophy

Tournament details
- Country: Netherlands
- Venue(s): De Kuip, Rotterdam
- Dates: 3 September 2024 – 21 April 2025
- Teams: 110

Final positions
- Champions: Go Ahead Eagles (1st title)
- Runners-up: AZ

The 2024–25 KNVB Cup, for sponsoring reasons officially called the TOTO KNVB Beker, was the 107th edition of the Dutch national football annual knockout tournament for the KNVB Cup. A total of 110 teams contested the trophy, beginning in September with the first of two preliminary rounds, and ending in April 2025 with the final played at De Kuip in Rotterdam. The winners qualified for the 2025–26 UEFA Europa League league stage and the 2025 Johan Cruyff Shield. Feyenoord were the defending champions, but were eliminated by PSV in the quarter-finals.

== Schedule ==
| Round | Draw | Match Dates |
|---|---|---|
| First preliminary round | 18 July 2024 | 3–4 September 2024 |
| Second preliminary round | 5 September 2024 | 24–25 September 2024 |
| First round | 28 September 2024 | 29–31 October 2024 |
| Second round | 1 November 2024 | 17–19 December 2024 |
| Round of 16 | 20 December 2024 | 14–16 January 2025 |
| Quarter-finals | 17 January 2025 | 4–6 February 2025 |
| Semi-finals | 7 February 2025 | 26–27 February 2025 |
| Final | 7 February 2025 | 21 April 2025 |

== First preliminary round ==
| 3 September 2024 | VV DOVO | 2–1 (a.e.t.) | SVV Scheveningen | Veenendaal |
| 20:00 | Hak 45+4'; den Boer 102' | | Ates 72' | Stadium: Sportpark Panhuis; Referee: Preston Henshuijs |

| 3 September 2024 | Achilles Veen | 2–1 | Harkemase Boys | Veen |
| 20:00 | Koenraat 56'; Vermeulen 69' | | Visser 4' | Stadium: De Heuye; Referee: Stijn van Zuilichem |

| 3 September 2024 | Kozakken Boys | 1–2 | VVSB | Werkendam |
| 20:00 | Stout 32' | | Mounji 79'; van Nieuwkerk 90' | Stadium: De Zwaaier; Referee: Tim Visser |

| 3 September 2024 | SV TEC | 4–2 | SV Urk | Tiel |
| 20:00 | Ket 19'; Yelkovan 21'; van Essen 23', 57' | | Nentjes 65'; van Essen 68' (pen.) | Stadium: Sportpark De Lok; Attendance: 250; Referee: Stan Smit |

| 3 September 2024 | VV Kloetinge | 1–2 | Quick '20 | Kloetinge |
| 20:00 | De Jager 82' | | Tanke 39'; Oude Veldhuis 85' | Stadium: Wesselopark; Attendance: 250; Referee: Sander de Brito Roque |

| 3 September 2024 | Rohda Raalte | 0–4 | Sportlust '46 | Raalte |
| 20:00 | | | Van der Veer 41'; Meiring 47', 75'; Olijfveld 72' | Stadium: Sportpark Tijenraan; Referee: Jorg Ordelmans |

| 3 September 2024 | SV Huizen | 1–2 | Excelsior Maassluis | Huizen |
| 20:00 | Lo-Asioe 26' | | Maatsen 41'; Wennerkers 73' (pen.) | Stadium: De Wolfskamer; Referee: Steve Janssen |

| 3 September 2024 | SV Poortugaal | 3–1 | ONS Sneek | Poortugaal |
| 20:00 | Rosina 36'; Van der Harst 45+2'; Breukhoven 84' | | Eekhof 29' | Stadium: Sportpark Polder Albrandswaard; Referee: John Kraak |

| 3 September 2024 | DVS '33 | 1–2 | OJC Rosmalen | Ermelo |
| 20:00 | Soree 30' | | Boulamhayan 3'; Wels 10' | Stadium: Sportpark Zuid; Referee: Eric van der Vaart |

| 3 September 2024 | USV Elinkwijk | 1–1 (a.e.t.) (3–4 p) | Olde Veste | Utrecht |
| 20:00 | Grilk 62' | | Kisjes 69' (pen.) | Stadium: Sportpark Zuilen; Referee: Michel Nijdeken |
| | Penalties |
| | Verkroost (penalty scored); Karafillakis (penalty scored); Ahmidouch (penalty missed); Grilk (penalty scored); J. van der Pol (penalty missed) | | (penalty scored) Kisjes; (penalty scored) De Vente; (penalty scored) M. Toeter; (penalty missed) Eikelboom; (penalty scored) Bruintjes |

| 3 September 2024 | FC Rijnvogels | 2–0 | Forum Sport | Katwijk |
| 20:00 | Van Oosten 14'; Van der Meer 53' | | | Stadium: Sportpark De Kooltuin; Referee: Haico Michielsen |

| 3 September 2024 | FC De Bilt | 2–4 (a.e.t.) | VV Eemdijk | De Bilt |
| 20:00 | Van der Sanden 27'; De Wit 35' (pen.) | | Van de Groep 37'; Deen 57'; Van den Dikkenberg 100'; Blokhuis 107' | Stadium: Sportpark Weltevreden; Attendance: 1,000; Referee: Richard Groenewegen |

| 3 September 2024 | RKSV HBC | 3–3 (a.e.t.) (5–6 p) | VV Kolping Boys | Heemstede |
| 20:00 | Wilderom 14'; Bekkach 50', 113' | | Rouppe van der Voort 66', 105'; Mandjes 85' | Stadium: Sportpark De Toekomst; Attendance: 218; Referee: Lars van Leeuwen |
| | Penalties |
| | Graves (penalty scored); Padilla de la Rosa (penalty scored); Van Ooijen (penalty scored); De Bruijn (penalty scored); Tervoort (penalty scored); Bekkach (penalty missed) | | (penalty scored) Ettouhlali; (penalty scored) Berkhout; (penalty scored) T. Kee; (penalty scored) Kemps; (penalty scored) Plomper; (penalty scored) Konijn |

| 3 September 2024 | VV Smitshoek | 1–1 (a.e.t.) (2–4 p) | FC Lisse | Barendrecht |
| 20:00 | Urban 13' | | R. van der Putten 67' | Stadium: Sportpark Smitshoek; Referee: Koen Molenaar |
| | Penalties |
| | Verhoeve (penalty scored); Vos (penalty scored); Van de Kreeke (penalty missed); Akinrinbola (penalty missed) | | (penalty scored) R. van der Putten; (penalty scored) D. Bakker; (penalty scored) L. Bakker; (penalty scored) Hudepohl |

| 3 September 2024 | SteDoCo | 2–3 | IJsselmeervogels | Hoornaar |
| 20:00 | Van Soest 45'; Van Zeelst 79' | | Afaker 6', 66'; Van Hees 55' | Stadium: Sportpark SteDoCo; Attendance: 1,000; Referee: Daniel Drost |

| 3 September 2024 | HSV Hoek | 2–1 (a.e.t.) | SDC Putten | Hoek |
| 20:00 | Schalkwijk 24' (pen.), 120+3' | | Buter 14' | Stadium: Sportpark Denoek; Attendance: 150; Referee: Maurick van Dijk |

| 3 September 2024 | VV Goes | 2–4 | USV Hercules | Goes |
| 20:00 | Traas 10'; De Winter 28' | | Bastmeijer 5'; Chiazor 29'; K. Vos 45'; Pieters 90+4' | Stadium: Sportpark Het Schenge; Attendance: 350; Referee: Niels Boel |

| 3 September 2024 | SV Meerssen | 0–1 | SC Genemuiden | Meerssen |
| 20:00 | | | Buitink 22' | Stadium: Sportpark Marsana; Attendance: 150; Referee: Oscar van Hoof |

| 3 September 2024 | Sparta Nijkerk | 6–0 | SV Laar | Nijkerk |
| 20:30 | El Ghazouani 8', 25'; Fonville 45'; Bakkenes 58'; Nsingi 72', 79'; Sterling (penalty missed) | | | Stadium: Sportpark De Ebbenhorst; Referee: Maarten Spoon |

| 4 September 2024 | FC Winterswijk | 2–0 | Blauw Wit '34 | Winterswijk |
| 20:00 | Veldhuis 55', 66' | | | Stadium: Sportpark Jaspers; Referee: Wim Bronsvoor |

| 4 September 2024 | TOGB | 0–4 | VV Noordwijk | Berkel en Rodenrijs |
| 20:00 | | | Wendt 44'; Tjin-Asjoe 49'; Reemnet 60', 90' | Stadium: Sportpark Het Hoge Land; Referee: Maarten Joël ter Velde |

| 4 September 2024 | Juliana '31 | 4–2 (a.e.t.) | VV Geldrop | Malden |
| 20:00 | Pijnenburg 26'; Beks 28' (o.g.); Diesel 94'; Meijers 116' | | De Haas 89'; Adriaans 90+4' (pen.) | Stadium: Sportpark De Broeklanden; Referee: Stefan van Westing |

| 4 September 2024 | HVV Hollandia | 0–1 (a.e.t.) | UDI '19 | Hoorn |
| 20:00 | | | Van de Voort 113' | Stadium: Sportpark Julianapark; Referee: Martijn Kieft |

| 4 September 2024 | HV & CV Quick | 4–1 | VV UNA | The Hague |
| 20:00 | Van Noort 1'; Abdoel 45+2'; Wijsman 63'; Kruis 84' | | Eenow Dahir 66' | Stadium: Sportpark Nieuw Hanenburg; Referee: Youri Kuipers |

| 4 September 2024 | VV Heerjansdam | 1–4 | Blauw Geel '38 | Heerjansdam |
| 20:00 | M. van den Berg 69' | | De Meij 19', 53'; Van den Nieuwenhof 50'; Voets 85' | Stadium: Sportpark De Molenwei; Referee: Sander Huijs |

| 4 September 2024 | VV Gemert | 4–0 | Excelsior '31 | Gemert |
| 20:00 | Craenen 16', 43'; Van Diepen 57'; Crommentuijn 90+1' | | | Stadium: Sportpark Molenbroek; Referee: Teun van Pelt |

| 4 September 2024 | FC 's-Gravenzande | 0–2 | RKAVV | 's-Gravenzande |
| 20:00 | | | Sandoya 1'; Bouras 79' | Stadium: Juliana Sportpark; Referee: Pieter van Veelen |

| 4 September 2024 | RKVV EVV | 0–0 (a.e.t.) (2–4 p) | RKVV Zwaluw VFC | Echt |
| 20:00 | | | | Stadium: Sportpark In de Bandert; Attendance: 350; Referee: Max Kok |
| | Penalties |
| | Eind (penalty missed); A. Gielen (penalty scored); Kawal (penalty missed); R. Gielen (penalty scored) | | (penalty scored) Vorstenbosch; (penalty scored) Huijgens; (penalty scored) Kreté; (penalty scored) Van Maasakkers |

| 4 September 2024 | RKVV DEM | 1–2 | AFC Ajax (amateurs) | Beverwijk |
| 20:00 | De Vries 5' | | Sporkslede 73' (pen.); Correia 76' | Stadium: Sportpark Adrichem; Referee: Rob Souwen |

| 4 September 2024 | VV Capelle | 3–1 (a.e.t.) | HSC '21 | Capelle aan den IJssel |
| 20:00 | Schippers 69'; Waandels 107'; Van der Heijden 120' | | Iallouchen 20' | Stadium: Sportpark 't Slot; Referee: Andy Wolff |

| 4 September 2024 | ASWH | 3–1 | VV SVBO | Hendrik-Ido-Ambacht |
| 20:00 | Adney 11'; Prijor 67', 90+5' | | De Boer 16' | Stadium: Sportpark Schildman; Attendance: 250; Referee: Geert den Ouden |

| 4 September 2024 | ADO '20 | 2–0 | DAW Schaijk | Heiloo |
| 20:00 | De Vré 1', 56' | | | Stadium: Sportpark Het Maalwater; Referee: Robin Gansner |

== Second preliminary round ==
| 24 September 2024 | ACV | 2–5 | IJsselmeervogels | Assen |
| 20:00 | Spijkerman 10', 48' | | Beekman 12'; Dkidak 59', 79'; Beers 61', 85' | Stadium: Sportpark ICT Specialist; Attendance: 1,250; Referee: Wouter Wiersma |

| 24 September 2024 | ASWH | 1–0 | HHC Hardenberg | Hendrik-Ido-Ambacht |
| 20:00 | Fetahi 89' | | | Stadium: Sportpark Schildman; Attendance: 625; Referee: Joshua Kuipers |

| 24 September 2024 | USV Hercules | 3–2 (a.e.t.) | Excelsior Maassluis | Utrecht |
| 20:00 | Tufi 56'; Bastmeijer 60'; Ten Have 120+3' | | Dahmani 13'; Maatsen 49' | Stadium: Sportpark Voordorp; Attendance: 1,000; Referee: Thomas Hardeman |

| 24 September 2024 | VV Noordwijk | 2–0 | HSV Hoek | Noordwijk |
| 20:00 | Rietveld 65'; Tjin-Asjoe 85' | | | Stadium: Sportpark Duinwetering; Attendance: 400; Referee: Niels Boel |

| 24 September 2024 | OJC Rosmalen | 2–1 (a.e.t.) | Olde Veste | Rosmalen |
| 20:00 | Van Tooren 58'; Reuvers 97' | | J. Dijkstra 30' | Stadium: Sportpark De Groote Wielen; Referee: Owen van Hoof |

| 24 September 2024 | HV & CV Quick | 0–3 | VV Capelle | The Hague |
| 20:00 | | | Van der Heijden 11'; Akdeniz 23'; Kusters 89' | Stadium: Sportpark Nieuw Hanenburg; Referee: Koen Molenaar |

| 24 September 2024 | RKAV Volendam | 2–3 (a.e.t.) | Blauw Geel '38 | Volendam |
| 20:00 | S. Schokker 45'; R. Tol 84' | | Van der Zanden 58'; Voets 90+5', 97' | Stadium: Hein Koning Voetbalstadion; Referee: Daniel Drost |

| 24 September 2024 | Rijnsburgse Boys | 1–0 | Sportlust '46 | Rijnsburg |
| 20:00 | Ros 13' | | | Stadium: Sportpark Middelmors; Attendance: 1,200; Referee: Tim Visser |

| 24 September 2024 | RKAVV | 0–1 | VV DOVO | Leidschendam |
| 20:00 | | | Screever 38' | Stadium: Sportpark Kastelenring; Referee: Teun van Pelt |

| 24 September 2024 | SC Genemuiden | 1–0 | ADO '20 | Genemuiden |
| 20:00 | Kroon 79' (o.g.) | | | Stadium: Sportpark De Wetering; Referee: Eric van der Vaart |

| 24 September 2024 | Sparta Nijkerk | 4–2 (a.e.t.) | Achilles Veen | Nijkerk |
| 20:00 | Van Dijk 60'; El Ghazouani 64'; Makizodila 105+2'; Berhout 107' | | Van Arnhem 24'; Goossens 59' (pen.) | Stadium: Sportpark De Ebbenhorst; Referee: Stan Smit |

| 24 September 2024 | VVSB | 1–2 | Quick '20 | Noordwijkerhout |
| 20:00 | Ossendrijver 7' | | Ilia 42', 52' | Stadium: Sportpark De Boekhorst; Referee: Jorg Ordelmans |

| 25 September 2024 | AFC | 3–0 | GVVV | Amsterdam |
| 20:00 | Eliasar 11'; De Mooij 40'; Klopper 41' | | | Stadium: Sportpark Goed Genoeg; Attendance: 250; Referee: Luuk Timmer |

| 25 September 2024 | AFC Ajax (amateurs) | 1–2 | VV Kolping Boys | Duivendrecht |
| 20:00 | Van Son 40' | | Van der Voort 84'; Van der Hoeven 90+2' | Stadium: Sportpark De Toekomst; Referee: Maarten Joël ter Velde |

| 25 September 2024 | BVV Barendrecht | 4–0 | SV TEC | Barendrecht |
| 20:00 | Serghini 8', 14'; Rook 48'; De Bruin 86' | | | Stadium: Sportpark De Bongerd; Referee: Preston Henshuijs |

| 25 September 2024 | VV Gemert | 0–2 | FC Winterswijk | Gemert |
| 20:00 | | | Veldhuis 25', 86' | Stadium: Sportpark Molenbroek; Referee: Steve Janssen |

| 25 September 2024 | Juliana '31 | 1–2 | FC Lisse | Malden |
| 20:00 | Van Lith 15' | | L. Bakker 36'; Zwetsloot 61' | Stadium: Sportpark De Broeklanden; Referee: Martin Wever |

| 25 September 2024 | SV Poortugaal | 1–3 | Koninklijke HFC | Poortugaal |
| 20:00 | Rosina 75' | | De Wilde 22', 54'; Van den Berg 80' | Stadium: Sportpark Polder Albrandswaard; Attendance: 1,200; Referee: Youri Kuipers |

| 25 September 2024 | UDI '19 | 1–2 | VV Eemdijk | Uden |
| 20:00 | Van den Broek 80' (pen.) | | Deen 8'; Van den Dikkenberg 12' | Stadium: Sportpark Parkzicht; Attendance: 1,000; Referee: Haico Michielsen |

| 25 September 2024 | RKVV Zwaluw VFC | 1–4 | FC Rijnvogels | Vught |
| 20:00 | Huijgens 13' | | Van der Meer 36', 50'; Van Oosten 74'; Koppenol 83' | Stadium: Sportpark Bergenshuizen; Attendance: 1,200; Referee: Andy Wolff |

== First round ==
The draw for the first round took place on 28 September 2024, with matches being played on 29, 30 and 31 October. Ajax, AZ, Feyenoord, Go Ahead Eagles, PSV and FC Twente are exempt from this round due to their participation in European football.

| 29 October 2024 | NEC | 4–3 (a.e.t.) | PEC Zwolle | Nijmegen |
| 18:45 | Hansen 62'; Ogawa 89', 105+1'; Shiogai 103' | Report | Monteiro 17'; Vente 68'; Buitink 116' (pen.) | Stadium: Goffertstadion; Attendance: 12,540; Referee: Rob Dieperink |

| 29 October 2024 | ADO Den Haag | 1–4 | Cambuur | Den Haag |
| 21:00 | Bonis 12' (pen.) | Report | Ottesen 25', 34'; Diemers 71'; Kooistra 83' | Stadium: Bingoal Stadion; Attendance: 5,174; Referee: Jeroen Manschot |

| 29 October 2024 | De Graafschap | 4–1 | TOP Oss | Doetinchem |
| 21:00 | El Kadiri 17'; Lambrix 45+1' (o.g.); El Jebli 51' (pen.); van Gilst 90+4' | Report | Stensrud 21' (pen.) | Stadium: De Vijverberg; Attendance: 6,223; Referee: Alex Bos |

| 29 October 2024 | De Treffers | 1–4 | Fortuna Sittard | Groesbeek |
| 21:00 | Waterink 47' | Report | Kornelis 58' (o.g.); da Cruz 59'; Bullaude 79', 89' (pen.) | Stadium: Sportpark Zuid; Attendance: 1,400; Referee: Kevin Puts |

| 29 October 2024 | Excelsior | 2–1 | VVV-Venlo | Rotterdam |
| 21:00 | Armantrading 3'; Naujoks 32' | Report | Berden 18' | Stadium: Van Donge & De Roo Stadion; Attendance: 2,951; Referee: Ingmar Oostrom |

| 29 October 2024 | FC Rijnvogels | 0–7 | FC Eindhoven | Katwijk |
| 21:00 | | Report | Blummel 6'; Huisman 15'; Gómez-Nieto 28', 75' (o.g.); Sleegers 32', 47'; Simons 90+1' | Stadium: Sportpark De Kooltuin; Attendance: 700; Referee: Rick Sturm |

| 29 October 2024 | IJsselmeervogels | 2–3 | SC Heerenveen | Bunschoten |
| 21:00 | Van Gorkom 52'; Beekman 56' | Report | Trenskow 47'; Nicolăescu 76'; Smans 78' | Stadium: Sportpark De Westmaat; Attendance: 4,000; Referee: Robin Hensgens |

| 29 October 2024 | VV Kolping Boys | 1–5 | FC Groningen | Wijdewormer |
| 21:00 | Mandjes 52' | Report | Resink 6'; Mendes 58'; Oosting 73', 85', 90+4' | Stadium: AFAS Traningscomplex; Attendance: 1,200; Referee: Laurens Gerrets |

| 29 October 2024 | VV Noordwijk | 2–1 | FC Dordrecht | Noordwijk |
| 21:00 | Van Staveren 86'; Tjin-Asjoe 88' | Report | Schuurman 76' | Stadium: Sportpark Duinwetering; Attendance: 500; Referee: Luuk Timmer |

| 29 October 2024 | Sparta Nijkerk | 5–1 | VV Capelle | Nijkerk |
| 21:00 | El Ghazouani 11'; Fonville 30', 74' (pen.); Bakkenes 45'; Ibrahim 57' | Report | Kusters 20' | Stadium: Sportpark De Ebbenhorst; Attendance: 800; Referee: Thomas Hardeman |

| 30 October 2024 | BVV Barendrecht | 2–1 | NAC Breda | Barendrecht |
| 17:30 | Vermeer 8'; Vugts 90+4' | Report | Mol 50' | Stadium: Sportpark De Bongerd; Attendance: 1,500; Referee: Erwin Blank |

| 30 October 2024 | AFC | 3–1 (a.e.t.) | Blauw Geel '38 | Amsterdam |
| 21:00 | Van Rhijn 22'; De Mooij 97'; Jesse 112' | Report | Van der Zanden 55' | Stadium: Sportpark Goed Genoeg; Attendance: 700; Referee: Niels Boel |

| 30 October 2024 | VV Eemdijk | 2–1 | OJC Rosmalen | Bunschoten |
| 21:00 | Van Dalen 27'; Van Groen 55' | Report | Vos 90+3' | Stadium: De Vinken; Attendance: 750; Referee: Tim Jeroen Visser |

| 30 October 2024 | FC Winterswijk | 0–1 | Heracles Almelo | Winterswijk |
| 21:00 | | Report | Talvitie 66' | Stadium: Sportpark Jaspers; Attendance: 3,200; Referee: Bas Nijhuis |

| 30 October 2024 | MVV Maastricht | 2–1 | FC Den Bosch | Maastricht |
| 21:00 | Aktaş 26'; Slegers 71' | Report | Knöll 9' | Stadium: De Geusselt; Attendance: 2,859; Referee: Jannick van der Laan |

| 30 October 2024 | Quick Boys | 3–0 | Almere City | Katwijk |
| 21:00 | Junte 9'; Zonneveld 45+5'; Broekhuizen 50' | Report | | Stadium: Sportpark Nieuw Zuid; Attendance: 4,123; Referee: Joey Kooij |

| 30 October 2024 | Rijnsburgse Boys | 3–1 | Roda JC | Rijnsburg |
| 21:00 | Asante 20'; Van der Weijden 33'; Van der Moot 84' | Report | Seedorf 63' | Stadium: Sportpark Middelmors; Attendance: 2,250; Referee: Richard Wilhelmus Martens |

| 30 October 2024 | RKC Waalwijk | 3–1 | Vitesse | Waalwijk |
| 21:00 | Margaret 10'; Zawada 30'; Van den Buijs 34' | Report | Yegoian 60' | Stadium: Mandemakers Stadion; Attendance: 3,612; Referee: Martin van den Kerkhof |

| 30 October 2024 | SC Genemuiden | 2–3 (a.e.t.) | Willem II | Genemuiden |
| 21:00 | Van de Wetering 20'; Etten 24' | Report | Vaesen 67' (pen.), 95'; Behounek 90+6' | Stadium: Sportpark De Wetering; Attendance: 3,000; Referee: Martijn Vos |

| 31 October 2024 | USV Hercules | 1–6 (a.e.t.) | Sparta Rotterdam | Utrecht |
| 18:45 | Bastmeijer 68' | Report | Verschueren 70'; Bais 93', 107'; Brym 100', 111'; Oufkir 103' | Stadium: Sportpark Voordorp; Attendance: 3,500; Referee: Sander van der Eijk |

| 31 October 2024 | VV DOVO | 1–5 | FC Volendam | Veenendaal |
| 20:00 | Martins 46' | Report | Jacobs 21', 62'; Kuwas 40'; Ould-Chikh 83' (pen.); Hoeve 90+2' | Stadium: Sportpark Panhuis; Attendance: 1,600; Referee: Wouter Wiersma |

| 31 October 2024 | Koninklijke HFC | 1–0 | FC Emmen | Haarlem |
| 20:00 | Ploem 83' | Report | | Stadium: Sportpark Spanjaardslaan; Attendance: 1,250; Referee: Stan Teuben |

| 31 October 2024 | Quick '20 | 0–2 | ASWH | Oldenzaal |
| 20:00 | | Report | Adney 72'; Tavares 90+4' | Stadium: Sportpark Vondersweijde; Attendance: 750; Referee: Eric van der Vaart |

| 31 October 2024 | SV Spakenburg | 2–4 (a.e.t.) | VV Katwijk | Bunschoten |
| 20:00 | Van Mil 8'; van der Linden 90+7' | Report | Schulte 83', 99'; Brandsma 84', 120+1' | Stadium: Sportpark De Westmaat; Attendance: 3,249; Referee: Preston Henshuijs |

| 31 October 2024 | Telstar | 3–0 | Helmond Sport | Velsen-Zuid |
| 20:00 | El Kachati 50'; Rossen 61'; Bakker 65' | Report | | Stadium: 711 Stadion; Attendance: 1,543; Referee: Robin Vereijken |

| 31 October 2024 | FC Lisse | 1–2 | FC Utrecht | Lisse |
| 21:00 | George 90+2' | Report | Bozdoğan 12'; Rodríguez 52' | Stadium: Ter Specke; Attendance: 2,700; Referee: Martin Perez |

== Second round ==
The second round consisted of 32 teams; the 26 winners from the first round, as well as the six Eredivisie clubs which automatically advanced to the second round due to their participation in European club competitions. The draw took place on 1 November 2024, with the matches being played on 17, 18 and 19 December 2024.

| 17 December 2024 | PSV Eindhoven | 8–0 | Koninklijke HFC | Eindhoven |
| 18:45 | Lozano 12'; Michaelis 18' (o.g.); Pepi 31', 83'; Til 38'; Heeremans 66' (o.g.); Perišić 89', 90+1' | Report | | Stadium: Philips Stadion; Attendance: 4,800; Referee: Erwin Blank |

| 17 December 2024 | FC Eindhoven | 1–3 | Excelsior | Eindhoven |
| 20:00 | Huisman 51' | Report | Booth 21', 29'; Donkor 90+5' | Stadium: Jan Louwers Stadion; Attendance: 1,721; Referee: Martijn Vos |

| 17 December 2024 | Quick Boys | 3–1 | Fortuna Sittard | Katwijk |
| 20:00 | Broekhuizen 35'; Zonneveld 45', 49' | Report | Da Cruz 20' | Stadium: Sportpark Nieuw Zuid; Attendance: 2,500; Referee: Bas Nijhuis |

| 17 December 2024 | RKC Waalwijk | 4–1 | Cambuur | Waalwijk |
| 20:00 | Zawada 14'; Van der Water 52'; Oukili 73'; Al Mazyani 84' | Report | Rölke 28' | Stadium: Mandemakers Stadion; Attendance: 3,127; Referee: Richard Martens |

| 17 December 2024 | MVV Maastricht | 1–2 | Feyenoord | Maastricht |
| 21:00 | Silva Timas 74' | Report | Redmond 3', 56' | Stadium: De Geusselt; Attendance: 8,500; Referee: Marc Nagtegaal |

| 18 December 2024 | VV Katwijk | 2–3 | FC Twente | Katwijk |
| 18:45 | Schulte 17'; Tahiri 84' | Report | Van Hoorenbeeck 3'; van Wolfswinkel 47'; Kuipers 50' | Stadium: Sportpark De Krom; Attendance: 5,000; Referee: Edwin van de Graaf |

| 18 December 2024 | AFC | 0–8 | FC Utrecht | Amsterdam |
| 20:00 | | Report | Jensen 34', 40'; Rodríguez 43', 60'; Blake 70'; Aaronson 78'; Min 87', 90' | Stadium: Sportpark Goed Genoeg; Attendance: 2,500; Referee: Robin Hensgens |

| 18 December 2024 | ASWH | 0–1 | SC Heerenveen | Hendrik-Ido-Ambacht |
| 20:00 | | Report | Nicolaescu 40' | Stadium: Sportpark Schildman; Attendance: 3,000; Referee: Ingmar Oostrom |

| 18 December 2024 | Heracles Almelo | 1–0 (a.e.t.) | NEC | Almelo |
| 20:00 | Scheperman 117' | Report | | Stadium: Asito Stadion; Attendance: 7,575; Referee: Allard Lindhout |

| 18 December 2024 | Sparta Rotterdam | 1–1 (a.e.t.) (4–5 p) | Go Ahead Eagles | Rotterdam |
| 20:00 | Brym 74' | Report | Breum 32' | Stadium: Sparta Stadion Het Kasteel; Attendance: 7,764; Referee: Joey Kooij |
| | Penalties |
| | Verschueren (penalty scored); Baas (penalty scored); Nassoh (penalty scored); Van der Kust (penalty scored); Oufkir (penalty missed) | | (penalty scored) James; (penalty scored) Llansana; (penalty scored) Suray; (penalty scored) Smit; (penalty scored) Deijl |

| 18 December 2024 | AZ | 3–1 | FC Groningen | Alkmaar |
| 21:00 | Mijnans 4'; Van Bommel 70'; Addai 84' | Report | Bacuna 41' (pen.) | Stadium: AFAS Stadion; Attendance: 8,881; Referee: Serdar Gözübüyük |

| 19 December 2024 | VV Noordwijk | 2–1 | Willem II | Noordwijk |
| 18:45 | Wendt 2'; Roep 56' | Report | Bokila 63' | Stadium: Sportpark Duinwetering; Attendance: 1,150; Referee: Martin van der Kerkhof |

| 19 December 2024 | De Graafschap | 4–0 | Sparta Nijkerk | Doetinchem |
| 20:00 | Van de Haar 12', 40', 59'; Hassan 79' | Report | | Stadium: De Vijverberg; Attendance: 6,132; Referee: Martín Pérez |

| 19 December 2024 | VV Eemdijk | 1–6 | BVV Barendrecht | Bunschoten |
| 20:00 | Van den Dikkenberg 88' | Report | Drexhage 5'; De Bruin 22', 26', 50'; Strick 86'; Rimon 89' | Stadium: De Vinken; Attendance: 2,100; Referee: Luuk Timmer |

| 19 December 2024 | Rijnsburgse Boys | 2–0 | FC Volendam | Rijnsburg |
| 20:00 | Ros 61'; Klaver 81' | Report | | Stadium: Sportpark Middelmors; Attendance: 2,500; Referee: Alex Bos |

| 19 December 2024 | Ajax | 2–0 | Telstar | Amsterdam |
| 21:00 | Rugani 64'; Akpom 86' | Report | | Stadium: Johan Cruyff Arena; Attendance: 53,017; Referee: Sander van der Eijk |

== Round of 16 ==
The 16 second round winners entered the Round of 16. The draw took place on 20 December 2024, with the matches being be played on 14, 15 and 16 January 2025.

| 14 January 2025 | AZ | 2–0 | Ajax | Alkmaar |
| 18:45 | Goes 36'; Meerdink 89' | Report | | Stadium: AFAS Stadion; Attendance: 15,032; Referee: Serdar Gözübüyük |

| 14 January 2025 | VV Noordwijk | 1–0 (a.e.t.) | BVV Barendrecht | Noordwijk |
| 20:00 | Roep 101' | Report | | Stadium: Sportpark Duinwetering; Attendance: 2,100; Referee: Marc Nagtegaal |

| 14 January 2025 | PSV Eindhoven | 5–4 (a.e.t.) | Excelsior | Eindhoven |
| 21:00 | Tillman 73'; Pepi 86', 101'; Saibari 90+7'; Perišić 110' | Report | Naujoks 45+3', 58'; Duijvestijn 80'; Omorowa 117' (pen.) | Stadium: Philips Stadion; Attendance: 22,300; Referee: Allard Lindhout |

| 15 January 2025 | Go Ahead Eagles | 3–1 | FC Twente | Deventer |
| 18:45 | O. Edvardsen 61'; Deijl 84'; Suray 90+4' | Report | Steijn 42' | Stadium: De Adelaarshorst; Attendance: 8,656; Referee: Danny Makkelie |

| 15 January 2025 | RKC Waalwijk | 1–2 | FC Utrecht | Waalwijk |
| 20:00 | Margaret 18' | Report | Haller 46', 80' (pen.) | Stadium: Mandemakers Stadion; Attendance: 3,079; Referee: Jeroen Manschot |

| 15 January 2025 | Rijnsburgse Boys | 1–4 | Feyenoord | Rijnsburg |
| 21:00 | Kariouh 43' | Report | Giménez 4', 40'; Read 7'; Osman 90+3' | Stadium: Sportpark Middelmors; Attendance: 4,000; Referee: Sander van der Eijk |

| 16 January 2025 | De Graafschap | 0–2 | Heracles Almelo | Doetinchem |
| 18:45 | | Report | Bruns 13'; Podgoreanu 67' | Stadium: De Vijverberg; Attendance: 7,592; Referee: Bas Nijhuis |

| 16 January 2025 | Quick Boys | 3–2 (a.e.t.) | SC Heerenveen | Katwijk |
| 21:00 | Nwankwo 37'; Zonneveld 88' (pen.); van Duijn 105+4' | Report | Sebaoui 48'; Nicolaescu 76' | Stadium: Sportpark Nieuw Zuid; Attendance: Sportpark Nieuw Zuid; Referee: Alex Bos |

== Quarter-finals ==
The eight winners of the round of 16 entered the quarter-finals. The draw took place on 17 January 2025, and the matches were played on 4, 5 and 6 February 2025.

| 4 February 2025 | Heracles Almelo | 2–0 | FC Utrecht | Almelo |
| 20:00 | Kulenović 8'; Rots 34' | Report | | Stadium: Asito Stadium; Attendance: 7,784; Referee: Rob Dieperink |

| 5 February 2025 | PSV Eindhoven | 2–0 | Feyenoord | Eindhoven |
| 18:45 | Bakayoko 8'; Til 68' | Report | | Stadium: Philips Stadion; Attendance: 35,100; Referee: Pol van Boekel |

| 5 February 2025 | Go Ahead Eagles | 3–1 | VV Noordwijk | Deventer |
| 21:00 | Suray 28'; Rietveld 73' (o.g.); Da Fonseca 78' (o.g.) | Report | Marbus 79' | Stadium: De Adelaarshorst; Attendance: 9,332; Referee: Jeroen Manschot |

| 6 February 2025 | AZ | 3–1 | Quick Boys | Alkmaar |
| 20:00 | Addai 33'; Parrott 58' (pen.); Smit 90+6' | Report | Brouwer 39' | Stadium: AFAS Stadion; Attendance: 14,334; Referee: Bas Nijhuis |

== Semi-finals ==
The four quarter-final winners entered the semi-finals. The matches were played on 26 and 27 February 2025.

| 26 February 2025 | PSV Eindhoven | 1–2 | Go Ahead Eagles | Eindhoven |
| 20:00 | Perišić 59' (pen.) | Report | Nauber 25'; Edvardsen 27' | Stadium: Philips Stadion; Attendance: 30,300; Referee: Dennis Higler |

| 27 February 2025 | Heracles Almelo | 2–2 (a.e.t.) (3–4 p) | AZ | Almelo |
| 20:00 | Mirani 17'; Podgoreanu 80' | Report | Poku 12'; Lahdo 28' | Stadium: Asito Stadium; Attendance: 12,161; Referee: Serdar Gözübüyük |
| | Penalties |
| | Hornkamp (penalty scored); Van Kaam (penalty scored); Hoogma (penalty missed); Engels (penalty scored); Mesík (penalty missed); Limbombe (penalty missed) | | (penalty scored) Clasie; (penalty missed) Parrott; (penalty scored) Koopmeiners; (penalty missed) Kasius; (penalty scored) Penetra; (penalty scored) Lahdo |

== Final ==
The final was held between the two semi-final winners on 21 April 2025.

21 April 2025
18:00 UTC+02:00

| AZ | 1–1 (a.e.t.) | Go Ahead Eagles |
|---|---|---|
| Parrott 54' (pen.) | Report | Deijl 90+9' (pen.) |
Penalties
| Meerdink (penalty scored); Koopmeiners (penalty scored); Buurmeester (penalty missed); Lahdo (penalty missed) | 2–4 | (penalty scored) Deijl; (penalty scored) Tengstedt; (penalty scored) Smit; (penalty scored) Dirksen |

De Kuip, Rotterdam
Attendance: 42,972
Referee: Danny Makkelie
