= 2019–20 De Graafschap season =

De Graafschap
2019–20 season
- Manager: Mike Snoei
- Stadium: De Vijverberg
- Eredivisie: 2nd
- KNVB Cup: First round
- Average home league attendance: 9,564
- All statistics correct as of 18:42, 27 May 2020 (UTC).

In 2019–20 season, De Graafschap played in the Eerste Divisie, the second tier of Dutch professional football. They finished 2nd, but were not promoted since promotion and relegation were cancelled as a result of the COVID-19 pandemic. They were knocked out of the KNVB Cup in the first round by Vitesse.

== Competitions ==
=== Eerste Divisie ===
==== League table ====
Pos	Team	Pld	W	D	L	GF	GA	GD	Pts
1	SC Cambuur	29	21	3	5	68	25	+43	66
2	De Graafschap (Note: Winner of the Third Period (games 20-28).)	29	17	11	1	63	28	+35	62
3	FC Volendam (Note: Winner of the Second Period (games 10-19).)	29	16	7	6	57	42	+15	55
4	Jong Ajax (Note: Reserves teams are not eligible to be promoted to the 2020–21 Eredivisie.)	29	16	6	7	72	47	+25	54
5	NAC Breda (Note: Winner of the First Period (games 1-9).)	29	14	8	7	48	30	+18	50

Updated to match(es) played on 9 March 2020. Source: Soccerway, Keuken Kampioen Divisie (in Dutch)
Rules for classification: Season in progress: 1) Most points won; 2) Fewest points lost; 3) Goal difference; 4) Goals scored; 5) Alphabetical order; End of season: 1) Points; 2) Goal difference; 3) Goals scored; 4) Head-to-head points; 5) Head-to-head goal difference; 6) Head-to-head away goals scored; 7) Play-off if relevant for deciding champion, relegation or participating in a European league, otherwise by draw. 8) Penalty shoot-out (only after a play-off)

=== KNVB Cup ===
29 October 2019 First round	Vitesse	2–0	De Graafschap	Arnhem
18:30 CET	Darfalou 3'; Dicko 68'	Report		Stadium: GelreDome; Attendance: 9,664; Referee: Lindhout

== Player Transfers ==
=== Players In ===
Date	Position	Player	From	Type	Fee	Ref.
1 July 2019	GK	(Netherlands) Hidde Jurjus	(Netherlands) PSV Eindhoven	Loan	Season Loan	
1 July 2019	MF	(Aruba) Gregor Breinburg	(Netherlands) Sparta Rotterdam	Transfer	Free	
1 July 2019	FW	(Netherlands) Ralf Seuntjens	(Netherlands) VVV-Venlo	Transfer	Free	
1 July 2019	DF	(Netherlands) Toine van Huizen	(Netherlands) Telstar	Transfer	Free	
1 July 2019	MF	(Netherlands) Jesse Schuurman	(Netherlands) Vitesse	Transfer	Free	
1 July 2019	DF	(Netherlands) Roland Baas	(Netherlands) Go Ahead Eagles	Transfer	Undisclosed	
23 July 2019	MF	(Netherlands) Dylan Chiazor	(Netherlands) vv IJsselmeervogels	Transfer	Free	
26 July 2019	DF	(Netherlands) Jasper van Heertum	(Netherlands) Telstar	Transfer	Free	

=== Players Out ===
Date	Position	Player	To	Type	Fee	Ref.
1 July 2019	FW	(Netherlands) Marlon Versteeg	(Netherlands) SV Spakenburg	Loan	Season Loan	
1 July 2019	FW	(Netherlands) Furdjel Narsingh	FC Ararat-Armenia	Transfer	Free	
1 July 2019	DF	(Netherlands) Jurre Vreman	(Netherlands) Woezik	Transfer	Free	
1 July 2019	FW	(Netherlands) Andreas Dusink	(Netherlands) FC Lienden	Transfer	Free	
1 July 2019	MF	(Netherlands) Liban Abdulahi	Released	Transfer	Free	
1 July 2019	DF	(Netherlands) Sven Nieuwpoort	Released	Transfer	Free	
1 July 2019	MF	(Netherlands) Koen Huntelaar	Released	Transfer	Free	
1 July 2019	DF	(Netherlands) Reyer van Doorn	Released	Transfer	Free	
4 July 2019	FW	(Netherlands) Delano Burgzorg	(Italy) Spezia Calcio	Transfer	Undisclosed	
7 July 2019	MF	(Netherlands) Robert Klaasen	(Netherlands) Roda JC	Transfer	Free	
11 July 2019	DF	(Netherlands) Bart Straalman	(Netherlands) Sarpsborg 08	Transfer	Free	
17 July 2019	FW	(Netherlands) Fabian Serrarens	(Poland) Arka Gdynia	Transfer	Free	
22 July 2019	DF	(Netherlands) Lars Nieuwpoort	(Netherlands) RKC Waalwijk	Transfer	Free	
25 July 2019	FW	(Sweden) Nabil Bahoui	(Sweden) AIK	Transfer	Free	

== Player statistics ==
=== Appearances and goals ===
No.	Pos	Nat	Player	Total		Eerste Divisie		KNVB Cup	
No.	Pos	Nat	Player	Apps	Goals	Apps	Goals	Apps	Goals
1	GK	(Netherlands) NED	Hidde Jurjus	30	0	29	0	1	0
2	DF	(Netherlands) NED	Victor van den Bogert	4	0	3	0	1	0
3	DF	(Netherlands) NED	Jasper van Heertum	23	2	22	2	1	0
4	DF	(Netherlands) NED	Ted van de Pavert	25	1	25	1	0	0
5	DF	(Netherlands) NED	Jordy Tutuarima	25	0	24	0	1	0
6	MF	(Netherlands) NED	Frank Olijve	8	0	8	0	0	0
7	MF	(Netherlands) NED	Branco van den Boomen	24	5	24	5	0	0
8	MF	(Netherlands) NED	Javier Vet	28	5	27	5	1	0
9	FW	(Netherlands) NED	Ralf Seuntjens	29	16	28	16	1	0
10	MF	(Netherlands) NED	Stef Nijland	21	3	21	3	0	0
11	FW	(Netherlands) NED	Daryl van Mieghem	22	9	21	9	1	0
12	FW	(Netherlands) NED	Jordy Thomassen	13	1	13	1	0	0
14	MF	(Netherlands) NED	Jeremy Helmer	13	1	12	1	1	0
16	GK	(Netherlands) NED	Jordy Rondeel	0	0	0	0	0	0
17	MF	(Netherlands) NED	Dylan Chiazor	1	0	0	0	1	0
18	MF	(Netherlands) NED	Jesse Schuurman	9	0	8	0	1	0
19	FW	(Netherlands) NED	Sven Blummel	6	0	6	0	0	0
20	MF	(Netherlands) NED	Youssef El Jebli	2	2	2	2	0	0
20	MF	(England) ENG	Callum Slattery	5	1	5	1	0	0
21	DF	(Netherlands) NED	Toine van Huizen	18	1	17	1	1	0
23	MF	(Netherlands) NED	Matthijs van Nispen	1	0	1	0	0	0
24	DF	(Netherlands) NED	Roland Baas	12	0	11	0	1	0
27	FW	(Greece) GRE	Giannis Mystakidis	6	0	6	0	0	0
30	DF	(Netherlands) NED	Milan Hilderink	1	0	1	0	0	0
34	DF	(Aruba) ARU	Gregor Breinburg	25	2	24	2	1	0
43	MF	(Netherlands) NED	Jonathan Vergara Berrio	1	0	1	0	0	0
44	DF	(Netherlands) NED	Leeroy Owusu	30	3	29	3	1	0
47	FW	(Netherlands) NED	Mohamed Hamdaoui	25	9	25	9	0	0
