= 2017–18 AZ Alkmaar season =

Dutch association football season in the Eredivisie

AZ
2017–18 season
- Chairman: René Neelissen
- Manager: John van den Brom
- Ground: AFAS Stadion
- Eredivisie: 3rd
- KNVB Cup: Runners-up
- Top goalscorer: League: Alireza Jahanbakhsh (21); All: Wout Weghorst (27)
- Highest home attendance: 17,002 vs PSV Eindhoven
- Lowest home attendance: 12,511 vs NAC Breda
- Average home league attendance: 14,791 Eredivisie; 13,317 KNVB Cup; 14,636 in both competitions
- Biggest win: 6–0 vs PEC Zwolle
- Biggest defeat: 0–4 vs Feyenoord
Home colours	Away colours	Third colours

During the 2017–18 season AZ competed in the Eredivisie for the 20th consecutive season and the KNVB Cup.

== Eredivisie ==
=== League table ===
Pos	Team	Pld	W	D	L	GF	GA	GD	Pts	Qualification or relegation
1	PSV Eindhoven (C)	34	26	5	3	87	39	+48	83	Qualification to Champions League play-off round
2	Ajax	34	25	4	5	89	33	+56	79	Qualification to Champions League second qualifying round
3	AZ	34	22	5	7	72	38	+34	71	Qualification to Europa League second qualifying round
4	Feyenoord	34	20	6	8	76	39	+37	66	Qualification to Europa League third qualifying round (Note: Feyenoord qualified for the Europa League third qualifying round by winning the 2017–18 KNVB Cup.)
5	Utrecht	34	14	12	8	58	53	+5	54	Qualification to European competition play-offs (Note: Four teams play for a spot in the 2018–19 UEFA Europa League second qualifying round.)

Source: eredivisie.nl
Rules for classification: 1) Points; 2) Goal difference; 3) Goals scored; 4) Head-to-head points; 5) Head-to-head goal difference; 6) Head-to-head away goals scored; 7) Play-off if relevant for deciding champion, relegation or participating in a European league, otherwise by draw. 8) Penalty shoot-out (only after a play-off)
(C) Champions

=== Results summary ===
Overall								Home						Away					
Pld	W	D	L	GF	GA	GD	Pts	W	D	L	GF	GA	GD	W	D	L	GF	GA	GD
34	22	5	7	72	38	+34	71	11	2	4	40	23	+17	11	3	3	32	15	+17

Last updated: 1 July 2017.
Source: Eredivisie

=== Results by matchday ===
Matchday	1	2	3	4	5	6	7	8	9	10	11	12	13	14	15	16	17	18	19	20	21	22	23	24	25	26	27	28	29	30	31	32	33	34
Ground	A	H	A	H	A	H	H	A	H	A	H	A	H	A	H	A	H	H	A	A	H	A	H	A	H	A	A	H	A	H	A	H	A	H
Result	L	W	W	W	W	L	L	D	W	W	W	W	W	W	W	D	L	W	D	W	D	W	D	W	W	W	L	W	W	L	W	W	L	W
Position	11	9	7	6	2	5	8	7	6	4	4	3	3	2	2	3	3	3	3	3	3	3	3	3	3	3	3	3	3	3	3	3	3	3

Updated to match(es) played on 6 May 2018. Source: AZ Alkmaar
A = Away; H = Home; W = Win; D = Draw; L = Loss

=== Matches ===
Win Draw Loss

The fixtures for the 2017–18 season were announced in June 2017.

12 August 2017 1	PSV Eindhoven	3–2	AZ Alkmaar	Eindhoven
18:30 CEST (UTC+02:00)	Lozano 31'; Pereiro 48' van Ginkel 76'	Report	18' dos Santos; (yellow card) 39' Vejinović; (yellow card) 79' Vlaar; 81' (pen.) Weghorst; (yellow card) 90' Seuntjens	Stadium: Philips Stadion; Attendance: 32,700; Referee: Bjorn Kuipers

19 August 2017 2	AZ Alkmaar	2–0	ADO Den Haag	Alkmaar
19:45 CEST (UTC+02:00)	Weghorst 29' (pen.) (yellow card) 71'; Til 70'; García (yellow card) 73'	Report	(yellow card) 28' Meijers; (yellow card) 28' (yellow-red card) Kanon	Stadium: AFAS Stadion; Attendance: 12,749; Referee: Danny Makkelie

26 August 2017 3	Vitesse Arnhem	1–2	AZ Alkmaar	Arnhem
18:30 CEST (UTC+02:00)	Matavž 68'; Miazga (yellow card) 87'	Report	3', 81' Weghorst; (yellow card) 33' Vejinović; (yellow card) 63' Ouwejan; (yellow card) 76' Wuytens	Stadium: GelreDome; Attendance: 14,500; Referee: Kevin Blom

10 September 2017 4	AZ Alkmaar	2–1	NAC Breda	Alkmaar
14:30 CEST (UTC+02:00)	Seuntjens (yellow card) 34'; Helmer 55'; Til 58'	Report	84' Korte; (yellow card) 87' Angeliño	Stadium: AFAS Stadion; Attendance: 12,511; Referee: Ed Janssen

15 September 2017 5	Sparta Rotterdam	0–2	AZ Alkmaar	Rotterdam
20:00 CEST (UTC+02:00)	Kortsmit (yellow card) 22'	Report	34', 61' Weghorst	Stadium: Het Kasteel; Attendance: 10,210; Referee: Siemen Mulder

24 September 2017 6	AZ Alkmaar	0–2	SBV Excelsior	Alkmaar
16:45 CEST (UTC+02:00)	Vlaar (yellow card) 7'	Report	2' (pen.), 8' (pen.) Bruins	Stadium: AFAS Stadion; Attendance: 12,527; Referee: Kevin Blom

1 October 2017 7	AZ Alkmaar	0–4	Feyenoord	Alkmaar
12:30 CEST (UTC+02:00)	Vlaar (yellow card) 7'	Report	11' Berghuis; 17', 41' Larsson; 57' Vilhena	Stadium: AFAS Stadion; Attendance: 14,644; Referee: Bas Nijhuis

15 October 2017 8	FC Groningen	1–1	AZ Alkmaar	Groningen
14:30 CEST (UTC+02:00)	Memišević (yellow card) 35'; Mahi 53' (pen.) (yellow card) 54'; Idrissi (yellow card) 63'; Jenssen (yellow card) 78'	Report	45' Jahanbakhsh; (yellow card) 52' Wuytens	Stadium: Euroborg; Attendance: 17,680; Referee: Bjorn Kuipers

22 October 2017 9	AZ Alkmaar	3–0	FC Utrecht	Alkmaar
14:30 CEST (UTC+02:00)	Koopmeiners 21'; Weghorst (yellow card) 55'; Jahanbakhsh 62'; Midtsjø (yellow card) 74' van Overeem 80'; Til (yellow card) 90'	Report	(yellow card) 41' Klaiber; (yellow card) 77' Emanuelson	Stadium: AFAS Stadion; Attendance: 14,056; Referee: Jochem Kamphuis

29 October 2017 10	SC Heerenveen	1–2	AZ Alkmaar	Heerenveen
16:45 CEST (UTC+02:00)	Vlap 21'; Næss (yellow card) 27'; Kobayashi (yellow card) 29'; Schaars (yellow card) 63'	Report	(yellow card) 23' Hatzidiakos; (yellow card) 39' Koopmeiners; (yellow card) 56' Midtsjø; (yellow card) 66' Weghorst; 73', 90' Til	Stadium: Abe Lenstra Stadion; Attendance: 19,136; Referee: Ed Janssen

4 November 2017 11	AZ Alkmaar	3–2	Willem II	Alkmaar
18:30 CEST (UTC+02:00)	Jahanbakhsh 35' (pen.); Til 54'; Weghorst 64' (yellow card) 86' (yellow-red card)	Report	25' Rienstra; (yellow card) 34' Peters; 85' Azzaoui	Stadium: AFAS Stadion; Attendance: 14,613; Referee: Kevin Blom

19 November 2017 12	Roda JC Kerkrade	0–1	AZ Alkmaar	Kerkrade
16:45 CEST (UTC+02:00)		Report	(yellow card) 28' Wuytens; (yellow card) 44' Til; 84' Seuntjens	Stadium: Parkstad Limburg Stadion; Attendance: 12,411; Referee: Allard Lindhout

24 November 2017 13	AZ Alkmaar	2–0	FC Twente	Alkmaar
20:00 CEST (UTC+02:00)	Jahanbakhsh 65' (pen.) van Overeem 70'	Report	(yellow card) 25' Lam	Stadium: AFAS Stadion; Attendance: 14,601; Referee: Martin van den Kerkhof

3 December 2017 14	VVV-Venlo	0–2	AZ Alkmaar	Venlo
12:30 CEST (UTC+02:00)		Report	(yellow card) 54' Wuytens; 73' (Own goal) Seuntjens; 84' Hatzidiakos	Stadium: De Koel; Attendance: 6,353; Referee: Bas Nijhuis

9 December 2017 15	AZ Alkmaar	5–0	Heracles Almelo	Alkmaar
19:45 CEST (UTC+02:00)	Castro 55' (Own goal); Til 75'; Jahanbakhsh 81'; Weghorst 85'; Svensson 90'	Report	(yellow card) 39' Duarte; (yellow card) 43' Baas; (yellow card) 86' van de Berg	Stadium: AFAS Stadion; Attendance: 13,863; Referee: Edwin van de Graaf

12 December 2017 16	PEC Zwolle	1–1	AZ Alkmaar	Zwolle
20:45 CEST (UTC+02:00)	Marcellis (yellow card) 18'; Ondaan 32'; Saymak (yellow card) 89'	Report	34' Jahanbakhsh; (yellow card) 50' Yil; (yellow card) 76' Wuytens; (yellow card) 83' Midtsjø; (yellow card) 86' Hatzidiakos; (yellow card) 89' Seuntjens	Stadium: MAC³PARK Stadion; Attendance: 12,875; Referee: Dennis Higler

17 December 2017 17	AZ Alkmaar	1–2	Ajax	Alkmaar
14:30 CEST (UTC+02:00)	Jahanbakhsh 25' (pen.); Hatzidiakos (yellow card) 50'; Svensson (yellow card) 86' (yellow-red card)	Report	(yellow card) 25' Zeefuik; 43' Huntelaar; 51' (pen.) Schöne; (yellow card) 88' de Jong	Stadium: AFAS Stadion; Attendance: 16,900; Referee: Danny Makkelie

23 December 2017 18	AZ Alkmaar	3–1	SC Heerenveen	Alkmaar
19:45 CEST (UTC+02:00)	van Rhijn (yellow card) 44'; Dumfries 80' (Own goal); Friday 84', 90'	Report	48' van Amersfoort; (yellow card) 60' Kobayashi; (yellow card) 68' (yellow-red card) Thorsby	Stadium: AFAS Stadion; Attendance: 15,012; Referee: Pol van Boekel

19 January 2018 19	FC Utrecht	1–1	AZ Alkmaar	Utrecht
20:00 CEST (UTC+02:00)	Ayoub (yellow card) 8'; Dessers 74'; Kerk 90'	Report	(yellow card) 42' Weghorst; 55' Svensson; (yellow card) 73' Jahanbakhsh; (yellow card) 78' Wuytens	Stadium: Stadion Galgenwaard; Attendance: 18,457; Referee: Serdar Gözübüyük

28 January 2018 20	Willem II	0–2	AZ Alkmaar	Tilburg
16:45 CEST (UTC+02:00)	Ogbeche (yellow card) 48'; Chirivella (yellow card) 61'	Report	6' Seuntjens; 14' Jahanbakhsh; (yellow card) 73' Svensson	Stadium: Koning Willem II Stadion; Attendance: 11,350; Referee: Reinold Wiedemeijer

4 February 2018 21	AZ Alkmaar	2–2	Roda JC Kerkrade	Alkmaar
14:30 CEST (UTC+02:00)	Banggaard 13' (Own goal); Midtsjø 36'	Report	22' Vancamp; 71' Ndenge; (yellow card) 73' Ngombo	Stadium: AFAS Stadion; Attendance: 15,007; Referee: Kevin Blom

7 February 2018 22	FC Twente	0–4	AZ Alkmaar	Enschede
18:30 CEST (UTC+02:00)	Vučkić (yellow card) 9'; Cuevas (yellow card) 73' (yellow-red card); Lam (yellow card) 82'	Report	10' (pen.), 90' (yellow card) 60'Jahanbakhsh; (yellow card) 64' Svensson; 89', 90' Weghorst	Stadium: Grolsch Veste; Attendance: 23,400; Referee: Siemen Mulder

10 February 2018 23	AZ Alkmaar	0–0	VVV-Venlo	Alkmaar
20:45 CEST (UTC+02:00)	Bel Hassani (yellow card) 78'	Report	(yellow card) 44' Castelen; (yellow card) 68' Janssen	Stadium: AFAS Stadion; Attendance: 14,023; Referee: Allard Lindhout

17 February 2018 24	NAC Breda	1–3	AZ Alkmaar	Breda
19:45 CEST (UTC+02:00)	Korte (yellow card) 51'; Meijers (yellow card) 56'; Sadiq 85'	Report	32'Jahanbakhsh; 47' Til; 52' Seuntjens	Stadium: Rat Verlegh Stadion; Attendance: 18,628; Referee: Jochem Kamphuis

24 February 2018 25	AZ Alkmaar	2–1	Sparta Rotterdam	Alkmaar
18:30 CEST (UTC+02:00)	Weghorst 44'; Idrissi 86'	Report	19' Chabot	Stadium: AFAS Stadion; Attendance: 14,884; Referee: Serdar Gözübüyük

3 March 2018 26	SBV Excelsior	1–2	AZ Alkmaar	Rotterdam
18:30 CEST (UTC+02:00)	Koolwijk (yellow card) 34'; Messaoud 64'; Bruins (yellow card) 70'	Report	20' (Own goal) Zwarthoed; 44'Jahanbakhsh; (yellow card) 75' Svensson	Stadium: Van Donge & De Roo Stadion; Attendance: 4,218; Referee: Pol van Boekel

11 March 2018 27	Feyenoord	2–1	AZ Alkmaar	Rotterdam
16:45 CEST (UTC+02:00)	Toornstra (yellow card) 19'; Boëtius 33' van der Heijden (yellow card) 61'; Jørgensen 73'	Report	(yellow card) 23'Jahanbakhsh; (yellow card) 26' Idrissi; 90' Weghorst	Stadium: Stadion Feijenoord; Attendance: 45,000; Referee: Dennis Higler

18 March 2018 28	AZ Alkmaar	3–2	FC Groningen	Alkmaar
12:30 CEST (UTC+02:00)	Svensson 53'; Til 66'; Jahanbakhsh 90'	Report	(yellow card) 33' Bacuna; 70' van Weert; 83' Doan; (yellow card) 90' Zeefuik; (yellow card) 90' te Wierik	Stadium: AFAS Stadion; Attendance: 16,459; Referee: Martin van den Kerkhof

31 March 2018 29	ADO Den Haag	0–3	AZ Alkmaar	The Hague
20:45 CEST (UTC+02:00)	Immers (yellow card) 41'	Report	18' Weghorst; 30' Idrissi; 43'Jahanbakhsh	Stadium: Cars Jeans Stadion; Attendance: 13,115; Referee: Bjorn Kuipers

7 April 2018 30	AZ Alkmaar	2–3	PSV Eindhoven	Alkmaar
19:45 CEST (UTC+02:00)	Weghorst 53', 61' (yellow card) 77'; Vlaar (yellow card) 78' (red card) 89'; Midtsjø (yellow card) 89'	Report	74' Pereiro; 76' Lozano; 79' (pen.) van Ginkel; (yellow card) 90' Malen	Stadium: AFAS Stadion; Attendance: 17,002; Referee: Kevin Blom

13 April 2018 31	Heracles Almelo	0–3	AZ Alkmaar	Almelo
20:00 CEST (UTC+02:00)	Gladon (yellow card) 32'; Monteiro (yellow card) 45'	Report	(yellow card) 13' Svensson; 25' Til; 30' Idrissi; 59'Jahanbakhsh	Stadium: Polman Stadion; Attendance: 10,724; Referee: Jochem Kamphuis

18 April 2018 32	AZ Alkmaar	4–3	Vitesse Arnhem	Alkmaar
18:30 CEST (UTC+02:00)	Weghorst 7'; Jahanbakhsh 12', 45', 54'	Report	22' Linssen; 40' Matavž; 66' Mount	Stadium: AFAS Stadion; Attendance: 16,067; Referee: Bas Nijhuis

29 April 2018 33	Ajax	3–0	AZ Alkmaar	Amsterdam
14:30 CEST (UTC+02:00)	van de Beek 38'; Kluivert 49'; Neres 87'	Report	(yellow card) 31' Til; (yellow card) 55' Svensson	Stadium: Amsterdam ArenA; Attendance: 35,000; Referee: Serdar Gözübüyük

6 May 2018 34	AZ Alkmaar	6–0	PEC Zwolle	Alkmaar
14:30 CEST (UTC+02:00)	Jahanbakhsh 13', 52', 88'; Midtsjø 62'; Weghorst 76', 77'; Koopmeiners (yellow card) 90'	Report	(yellow card) 35' Marcellis	Stadium: AFAS Stadion; Attendance: 16,532; Referee: Allard Lindhout

== KNVB Cup ==
19 September 2017 First round	MVV Maastricht	2–3	AZ Alkmaar	Maastricht
20:45 CEST (UTC+02:00)	Mmaee 34', 72'; Nys (yellow card) 75'; Pereira 90'	Report	7' Hatzidiakos; 43', 82' Weghorst	Stadium: De Geusselt; Attendance: 4.270; Referee: Makkelie

26 October 2017 Second round	Almere City FC	0–4	AZ Alkmaar	Almere
20:45 CEST (UTC+02:00)	van Buuren (yellow card) (yellow-red card) 61' 61'; Kvída (yellow card) 70'	Report	35' Wuytens; 48', 59' Weghorst; 75' Svensson	Stadium: Yanmar Stadion; Attendance: 3,000; Referee: Makkelie

20 December 2017 Third round	Fortuna Sittard	2–4	AZ Alkmaar	Sittard
19:45 CEST (UTC+02:00)	Dianessy 27' (yellow card) 87'; Stokkers 48'; Essers (yellow card) 79'	Report	2', 89' Weghorst; (yellow card) 87' (goal) 92' Jahanbakhsh; 94' García	Stadium: Fortuna Sittard Stadion; Attendance: 5,089; Referee: Lindhout

31 January 2018 Quarter-finals	AZ Alkmaar	4–1	PEC Zwolle	Alkmaar
18:30 CEST (UTC+02:00)	Weghorst 21', 71'; Til 39'; Idrissi 60'	Report	(yellow card) 23' Mokhtar; 32' Marinus; (red card) 54' Boer	Stadium: AFAS Stadion; Attendance: 13,247; Referee: Nijhuis

28 February 2018 Semi-finals	AZ Alkmaar	4–0	FC Twente	Alkmaar
18:30 CEST (UTC+02:00)	Til 24'; Weghorst 64'; Idrissi 68', 73'	Report	(yellow card) 30' Assaidi	Stadium: AFAS Stadion; Attendance: 13,388; Referee: Makkelie

22 April 2018 Final	AZ Alkmaar	0–3	Feyenoord	Rotterdam
18:00 CEST (UTC+02:00)	Midtsjø (yellow card) 37'; Jahanbakhsh (yellow card) 43'; Weghorst (yellow card) 43'; Koopmeiners (yellow card) 46'	Report	28' Jørgensen; (yellow card) 50' El Ahmadi; 57' van Persie; (yellow card) 69' Diks; (yellow card) 77' Boëtius; 93' Toornstra	Stadium: Stadion Feijenoord; Attendance: 46,084; Referee: Kuipers

== Pre-season and friendlies ==
The first training session for the new season began on 25 June. Friendlies were arranged with smaller teams in the Netherlands as well as a few additional friendlies against foreign teams touring the Netherlands.

1 July 2017	Regioselectie	1–7	AZ Alkmaar	Dirkshorn
16:00 CEST (UTC+02:00)	Lanting 58' (pen.)	Report	5', 43' van Overeem; 30' dos Santos; 61' Ouwejan; 70' Til; 75' Weghorst; 81' Helmer	Stadium: Sportpark Dirkshorn; Attendance: 3,000

6 July 2017	Oleksandriya (Ukraine)	1–3	AZ Alkmaar	Dirkshorn
19:00 CEST (UTC+02:00)	Hrytsuk (red card) 45'; Polyarus 58' (pen.)	Report	38' Helmer; 45' (pen.) Weghorst; 76' van Overeem	Stadium: Sportpark Dirkshorn; Attendance: 1,000; Referee: Lindhout

7 July 2017	Polderse Selectie	2–3	AZ Alkmaar	Anna Paulowna
19:00 CEST (UTC+02:00)	Broersen 5'; Raap 31'	Report	14' van Overeem; 59' Seuntjens; 90' Luckassen	Stadium: Sportpark Kleine Sluis; Attendance: 3,000

12 July 2017	AZ Alkmaar	0–2	(Greece) Olympiacos	Leende
16:30 CEST (UTC+02:00)		Report	59', 63' (pen.) Nabouhane	Stadium: Sportpark De Grote Speel; Attendance: 50

15 July 2017	Club Brugge (Belgium)	1–3	AZ Alkmaar	Deinze (Belgium)
16:30 CEST (UTC+02:00)	Limbombe 4'	Report	27' (pen.), 67', 70' Weghorst	Stadium: Burgemeester Van de Wielestadion; Referee: (Belgium) Lardot

20 July 2017	Panathinaikos (Greece)	2–1	AZ Alkmaar	Athens (Greece)
20:00 CEST (UTC+02:00)	Altman 45'; Molins 58'	Report	63' Stengs	Stadium: Leoforos Alexandras Stadium; Attendance: 5,000; Referee: (Greece) Evangelou

26 July 2017	AZ Alkmaar	3–0	(Spain) Malaga	Alkmaar
19:00 CEST (UTC+02:00)	Ouwejan 65' van Overeem 71'; Seuntjens 87'	Report		Stadium: AFAS Stadion; Attendance: 3,200; Referee: Mulder

29 July 2017	AZ Alkmaar	3–0	VVCS	Alkmaar
14:00 CEST (UTC+02:00)	Helmer 10', 43'; Rienstra 55'	Report		Stadium: AFAS Trainingscomplex; Referee: Vonken

29 July 2017	AZ Alkmaar	4–0	SC Cambuur	Alkmaar
18:00 CEST (UTC+02:00)	Weghorst 8' van Overeem 17' dos Santos 81'; Stengs 85'	Report		Stadium: AFAS Trainingscomplex; Referee: Dröge

4 August 2017	AZ Alkmaar	2–1	Willem II	Alkmaar
13:00 CEST (UTC+02:00)	van der Linden 57'; Rienstra 67'	Report	10' Coulibaly	Stadium: AFAS Trainingscomplex; Referee: Teuben

5 August 2017	Udinese (Italy)	1–2	AZ Alkmaar	Udine (Italy)
20:30 CEST (UTC+02:00)	Perica 55' (pen.)	Report	31' Vejinović; 45' van Overeem	Stadium: Dacia Arena; Attendance: 4,042; Referee: (Italy) Pairetto

1 September 2017	KV Mechelen (Belgium)	1–1	AZ Alkmaar	Mechelen (Belgium)
19:00 CEST (UTC+02:00)	Vitas 81'	Report	33' (pen.) Vejinović	Stadium: AFAS-stadion Achter de Kazerne; Referee: (Belgium) Gumienny

8 November 2017	SC Cambuur	1–5	AZ Alkmaar	Leeuwarden
19:00 CEST (UTC+02:00)	van Haaren 90'	Report	35' (pen.) Seuntjens; 43' Bel Hassani; 45', 82' dos Santos; 86' El Hasnaoui	Stadium: Cambuur Stadion; Attendance: 100

12 January 2018	AZ Alkmaar	2–2	(Switzerland) FC St. Gallen	Estepona (Spain)
15:00 CEST (UTC+02:00)	Ouwejan 12'; Bel Hassani 70'	Report	33' Gönitzer; 73' (pen.) Barnetta	Stadium: Complejo Deportivo Arroyo Enmedio

== Player details ==
No.	Pos	Nat	Player	Total		Eredivisie (Note: Main competition + play-offs)		KNVB Cup	
No.	Pos	Nat	Player	Apps	Goals	Apps	Goals	Apps	Goals
1	GK	(Netherlands) NED	Marco Bizot	40	0	34	0	6	0
2	DF	(Norway) NOR	Jonas Svensson	38	4	32	3	6	1
3	DF	(Netherlands) NED	Rens van Eijden	3	0	3	0	0	0
4	DF	(Netherlands) NED	Ron Vlaar	13	0	12	0	1	0
5	DF	(Netherlands) NED	Thomas Ouwejan	37	0	31	0	6	0
6	MF	(Norway) NOR	Fredrik Midtsjø	35	2	29	2	6	0
7	FW	(Iran) IRI	Alireza Jahanbakhsh	39	22	33	21	6	1
8	MF	(Netherlands) NED	Joris van Overeem	30	2	25	2	5	0
9	FW	(Netherlands) NED	Wout Weghorst	37	27	31	18	6	9
10	MF	(Netherlands) NED	Marko Vejinović	8	0	7	0	1	0
12	DF	(Greece) GRE	Pantelis Hatzidiakos	29	2	26	1	3	1
14	MF	(Netherlands) NED	Teun Koopmeiners	31	1	26	1	5	0
15	MF	(Netherlands) NED	Guus Til	39	11	33	9	6	2
16	GK	(Netherlands) NED	Gino Coutinho	0	0	0	0	0	0
17	MF	(Netherlands) NED	Jeremy Helmer	12	1	9	1	3	0
18	MF	(Netherlands) NED	Iliass Bel Hassani	7	0	6	0	1	0
19	FW	(Netherlands) NED	Dabney dos Santos	9	1	8	1	1	0
20	MF	(Netherlands) NED	Mats Seuntjens	37	3	31	3	6	0
21	FW	(Netherlands) NED	Myron Boadu	1	0	1	0	0	0
22	FW	(Netherlands) NED	Oussama Idrissi	15	6	12	3	3	3
23	DF	(Netherlands) NED	Ricardo van Rhijn	15	0	11	0	4	0
24	MF	(Netherlands) NED	Tijjani Reijnders	1	0	1	0	0	0
25	GK	(Netherlands) NED	Nick Olij	0	0	0	0	0	0
26	DF	(Netherlands) NED	Owen Wijndal	7	0	7	0	0	0
27	FW	(Czech Republic) CZE	Ondrej Mihalik	3	0	2	0	1	0
27	FW	(Nigeria) NGR	Fred Friday	5	2	5	2	0	0
28	FW	(Trinidad and Tobago) TTO	Levi García	6	1	4	0	2	1
29	FW	(Netherlands) NED	Calvin Stengs	1	0	1	0	0	0
30	DF	(Belgium) BEL	Stijn Wuytens	35	1	29	0	6	1
38	FW	(Netherlands) NED	Ferdy Druijf	3	0	3	0	0	0

Sources: Squad numbers, Eredivisie en KNVB Cup stats,

== Transfers ==
In: Note: Flags indicate national team as defined under FIFA eligibility rules; some limited exceptions apply. Players may hold more than one non-FIFA nationality.

No.	Pos.	Nation	Player
—	GK	NED	Marco Bizot (from (Belgium) KRC Genk)
—	MF	NOR	Fredrik Midtsjø (from (Norway) Rosenborg BK)
—	FW	NED	Oussama Idrissi (from (Netherlands) FC Groningen)
—	FW	CZE	Ondrej Mihalik (from (Czech Republic) FK Jablonec)
—	MF	NED	Marko Vejinović (on loan from (Netherlands) Feyenoord)
—	DF	NED	Ricardo van Rhijn (on loan from (Belgium) Club Brugge)

Out: Note: Flags indicate national team as defined under FIFA eligibility rules; some limited exceptions apply. Players may hold more than one non-FIFA nationality.

No.	Pos.	Nation	Player
—	FW	URU	Sergio Rochet (to (Turkey) Sivasspor)
—	DF	SWE	Mattias Johansson (to (Greece) Panathinaikos F.C.)
—	DF	NED	Ridgeciano Haps (to (Netherlands) Feyenoord)
—	FW	SWE	Muamer Tanković (to (Sweden) Hammarby IF)
—	DF	NED	Derrick Luckassen (to (Netherlands) PSV Eindhoven)
—	DF	NED	Fernando Lewis (to (Netherlands) Willem II)
—	MF	NED	Ben Rienstra (on loan to (Netherlands) Willem II)
—	DF	NED	Jop van der Linden (on loan to (Netherlands) Willem II)
—	FW	NED	Dabney dos Santos (on loan to (Netherlands) Sparta Rotterdam)
—	FW	NGR	Fred Friday (on loan to (Netherlands) Sparta Rotterdam)
—	FW	TTO	Levi García (on loan to (Netherlands) SBV Excelsior)
—	DF	NED	Levi Opdam (on loan to (Netherlands) Go Ahead Eagles)
