= Voets =

Voets is a surname. Notable people with the surname include:

- Margo Voets (born 1995), Belgian volleyball player
- Peter Voets (born 1968), Belgian football player and manager
- Robin Voets (born 2001), Dutch footballer
- Sanne Voets (born 1986), Dutch Paralympic equestrian

== See also ==
- Voet
