= Roy Bakkenes =

Dutch footballer

Personal information
- Full name: Roy Bakkenes
- Date of birth: 8 November 1990 (age 35)
- Place of birth: Amersfoort, Netherlands
- Height: 1.74 m (5 ft 8 1/2 in)
- Position: Midfielder

Team information
- Current team: Sparta Nijkerk
- Number: 17

Youth career
- KVVA
- IJsselmeervogels
- RKAV Volendam

Senior career*
| Years | Team | Apps | (Gls) |
| 2010–2013 | Volendam | 57 | (1) |
| 2013–2014 | FC Antwerp | 24 | (1) |
| 2014–2020 | DOVO | 82 | (9) |
| 2020–2026 | Sparta Nijkerk | 124 | (21) |
| 2026– | Scherpenzeel | | |
- * Club domestic league appearances and goals as of 8 January 2026

Roy Bakkenes (born 8 November 1990) is a Dutch footballer who plays as a midfielder for Sparta Nijkerk.

== Club career ==
He started his professional career at FC Volendam before moving abroad to Belgian side Royal Antwerp in 2013. He returned to Holland to join Hoofdklasser DOVO in summer 2014. After a couple of seasons at Sparta Nijkerk, Bakkenes will join VV Scherpenzeel in summer 2026.
