= Matthijs van Nispen =

Dutch footballer (born 1998)

Personal information
- Date of birth: 29 January 1998 (age 28)
- Place of birth: Doetinchem, Netherlands
- Height: 1.87 m (6 ft 2 in)
- Position: Midfielder

Team information
- Current team: DOVO
- Number: 10

Youth career
- DZC '68
- 2008–2017: De Graafschap

Senior career*
Years	Team	Apps	(Gls)
2017–2019	Jong De Graafschap	16	(0)
2019–2020	De Graafschap	1	(0)
2020	TOP Oss	3	(0)
2021	PAEEK	11	(0)
2021–2022	DOVO	28	(3)
2022–2023	De Treffers	13	(0)
2023–	DOVO	62	(5)
- * Club domestic league appearances and goals as of 23:09, 11 January 2025 (UTC)

Matthijs van Nispen (born 29 January 1998) is a Dutch footballer who plays as a midfielder for Derde Divisie club DOVO.

== Career ==
After playing youth football for DZC '68, van Nispen joined De Graafschap's academy aged 9. He made his debut for the first team on 20 September 2019 as a late substitute for Branco van den Boomen in a 4–0 win at home to FC Eindhoven.

On 6 July 2020, Van Nispen signed a one-year deal with TOP Oss. After three appearances at the club, he moved to Cypriot Second Division club PAEEK in January 2021. He won the Cypricot Second Division title with the club that season as they were promoted to the Cypriot First Division.

In summer 2021, van Nispen joined Derde Divisie club VV DOVO on a one-year contract. In December 2021, he extended his contract until mid-2024.

== Career statistics ==
As of match played 19 February 2022

Appearances and goals by club, season and competition
Club	Season	League			KNVB Cup		Other		Total	
Club	Season	Division	Apps	Goals	Apps	Goals	Apps	Goals	Apps	Goals
Jong de Graafschap	2016–17	Derde Divisie	5	0	—		0	0	5	0
Jong de Graafschap	2017–18	Derde Divisie	11	0	—		0	0	11	0
Jong de Graafschap	Total		16	0	0	0	0	0	16	0
De Graafschap	2019–20	Eerste Divisie	1	0	0	0	0	0	1	0
TOP Oss	2020–21	Eerste Divisie	3	0	1	0	0	0	4	0
VV DOVO	2021–22	Derde Divisie Saturday	13	0	2	1	0	0	15	1
Career total			33	0	3	1	0	0	36	1
