= Jeremy Helmer =

Dutch footballer (born 1997)

Personal information
- Date of birth: 3 July 1997 (age 29)
- Place of birth: Amstelveen, Netherlands
- Height: 1.80 m (5 ft 11 in)
- Position: Winger

Youth career
- SV Diemen
- AZ

Senior career*
Years	Team	Apps	(Gls)
2016–2022	Jong AZ	50	(16)
2016–2022	AZ	14	(1)
2019–2020	→ De Graafschap (loan)	12	(1)
2024–2026	IJsselmeervogels	37	(10)
Total		113	(28)

International career
2014–2015	Netherlands U17	1	(0)
2015–2016	Netherlands U18	2	(1)
2016–2017	Netherlands U20	6	(0)
2017	Netherlands U21	1	(0)
- * Club domestic league appearances and goals

Jeremy Helmer (born 3 July 1997) is a Dutch retired footballer who played as a winger.

== Club career ==
=== Early career ===
Helmer played for SV Diemen before moving to AZ Alkmaar.

=== AZ Alkmaar ===
After playing in the youth teams at AZ Alkmaar, Jeremy Helmer was contracted on 1 July 2016 by AZ Alkmaar for two years. His league debut for the senior team came on 19 February 2017 in a 1–1 draw with Willem II. He was brought on for Mats Seuntjens in the 61st minute. His first goal for the senior squad came on 10 September 2017 in a 2–1 win over NAC Breda. His goal, assisted by Joris van Overeem, came in the 55th minute.

=== Retirement ===
On 10 July 2026, Helmer's retirement from football was announced by his last club IJsselmeervogels, citing injury issues.

== International career ==
Helmer was capped once by the Netherlands national under-21 football team and played 6 matches for the U20s.

== Personal life ==
Helmer's brother, Quinten, is also a footballer.

== Honors ==
Jong AZ

- Tweede Divisie: 2016–17

== Career statistics ==
=== Club ===
As of match played 23 August 2023

Appearances and goals by club, season and competition
Club	Season	League			KNVB Cup		Europe		Other		Total	
Club	Season	Division	Apps	Goals	Apps	Goals	Apps	Goals	Apps	Goals	Apps	Goals
Jong AZ	2016–17	Tweede Divisie	27	11	—		—		—		27	11
Jong AZ	2017–18	Eerste Divisie	6	3	—		—		—		6	3
Jong AZ	2018–19	Eerste Divisie	17	3	—		—		—		17	3
Jong AZ	Total		50	17	0	0	0	0	0	0	50	17
AZ Alkmaar	2016–17	Eredivisie	2	0	2	0	0	0	2 (Note: Appearance(s) in play-off)	0	6	0
AZ Alkmaar	2017–18	Eredivisie	9	1	3	0	—		—		12	1
AZ Alkmaar	2018–19	Eredivisie	1	0	0	0	0	0	—		1	0
AZ Alkmaar	Total		12	1	5	0	0	0	2	0	19	1
De Graafschap (loan)	2019–20	Eerste Divisie	12	1	1	0	—		—		13	1
Career total			74	19	6	0	0	0	2	0	82	19
