= Lion Kalentjev =

Dutch-Russian footballer

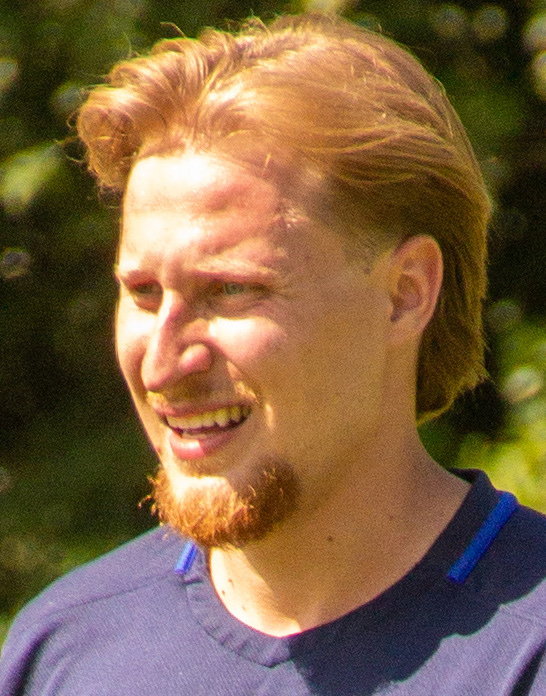

Personal information
- Date of birth: 9 January 2000 (age 26)
- Place of birth: Groningen, Netherlands
- Height: 1.75 m (5 ft 9 in)
- Position: Forward

Youth career
- VV Helpman
- –2011: GVAV-Rapiditas
- 2011–2014: Groningen
- 2014–2019: Feyenoord
- 2019–2020: NEC

Senior career*
Years	Team	Apps	(Gls)
2020–2021	NEC II	2	(0)
2020–2021	→ TOP Oss (loan)	3	(0)
2021–2023	DOVO	16	(6)
2023–2024	Westlandia		
Total		21	(6)

International career
2018	Russia U18	3	(1)
- * Club domestic league appearances and goals

Lion Kalentjev (Russian: Лион Калентьев; born 9 January 2000) is a former footballer who plays as a forward. Born in the Netherlands to Russian parents, he represented Russia internationally on junior levels.

== Club career ==
He spent most of his junior career at Feyenoord and represented the club in the 2017–18 UEFA Youth League before joining NEC before the 2019–20 season. In November 2020, he was sent on loan to Eerste Divisie club TOP Oss.

He made his professional Eerste Divisie debut for TOP Oss on 14 December 2020 in a game against Jong FC Utrecht. As his contract expired with NEC on 30 June 2021, Kalentjev practiced with TOP Oss ahead of the new season.

On 12 July 2021, Kalentjev signed with DOVO, competing in the Derde Divisie. He made his debut on 21 August, also scoring his first goal for the club, in a 3–3 draw against VVOG. Ahead of the 2023–24 season, Kalentjev signed for Vierde Divisie club RKVV Westlandia.

== Personal life ==
He was born in Groningen four months after his parents arrived to Netherlands from Russia as asylum seekers.
