= Willem Leushuis =

Dutch footballer and coach (born 1952)

Personal information
- Date of birth: 18 March 1952 (age 74)
- Place of birth: Eindhoven, Netherlands
- Position: Midfielder

Team information
- Current team: IJsselmeervogels (head coach)

Youth career
- PSV

Senior career*
Years	Team	Apps	(Gls)
1970–1974	FC Eindhoven	63	(3)
1974–1977	Den Bosch '67	96	(13)
1977–1981	Wageningen	133	(11)
1981–1983	Assent		
1983–1986	KTH Diest		
1986–1989	KFCV Geel		
1989–1992	Beringen		

Managerial career
- 1997–2000: FC Eindhoven
- 2003–2005: Kozakken Boys
- 2005–2006: IJsselmeervogels
- 2006–2007: Kuwait SC
- 2007–2008: Hoek
- 2008–2010: ASWH
- 2011–2013: Breukelen
- 2013–2014: AFC
- 2017: DVS '33
- 2017–2018: IJsselmeervogels
- 2019–2025: OJC Rosmalen
- 2025–: IJsselmeervogels
- * Club domestic league appearances and goals

Willem Leushuis (born 18 March 1952) is a Dutch football coach and former professional footballer who is the head coach of Tweede Divisie club IJsselmeervogels.

== Playing career ==
Willem Leushuis was born in Eindhoven. A midfielder, he spent his senior playing career in the Netherlands and Belgium. In the Netherlands, he represented FC Wageningen, FC Den Bosch, and FC Eindhoven, before moving abroad to Belgium, where he played for KFCV Geel, Beringen, and KTH Diest.

== Coaching career ==
=== Early coaching roles ===
After retiring as a player, Leushuis began his coaching career at Willem II between 1992 and 1995. He served as assistant coach to Jan Reker and also held responsibility for the club's reserve team. In 1995, he was appointed head coach of Helmond Sport, a position he held until 1997. He subsequently returned to FC Eindhoven, where he managed the first team from 1997 to 2000.

=== International experience ===
Following his departure from FC Eindhoven, Leushuis gained international experience, working as a coach in the United Arab Emirates and Kuwait. During this period, he also served as a match analyst for the Scottish Football Association.

=== Return to the Netherlands ===
Leushuis returned to the Netherlands in 2003, taking charge of Kozakken Boys from 2003 to 2005, before managing IJsselmeervogels during the 2005–06 season. He then returned briefly to the Middle East in 2006–07.

Upon his return to Dutch football, Leushuis managed a succession of clubs at semi-professional level, including HSV Hoek (2007–08), ASWH (2008–10), FC Breukelen (2011–13), and AFC (2013–14).

=== Kuwait Football Association ===
In January 2015, at the age of 62, Leushuis moved to Kuwait, where he was appointed technical director of the Kuwait Football Association and head coach of the Kuwaiti Olympic team. Under his tenure, the Olympic side recorded victories over Oman, Qatar, and the United Arab Emirates, before finishing as runners-up after losing the final to Saudi Arabia.

=== Later career ===
In February 2017, Leushuis returned to the Netherlands and was appointed interim manager of DVS '33. Later that year, in August 2017, he began a second spell at IJsselmeervogels, remaining with the club for one season. In 2019, he took charge of OJC Rosmalen, where he served as head coach for six years. In 2022, while managing OJC, Leushuis guided the club to promotion to the Derde Divisie after winning the post-season play-offs.

In December 2025, Leushuis was appointed head coach of IJsselmeervogels for a third time, succeeding Raymond Bronkhorst with the club positioned second from bottom in the Tweede Divisie.

== Personal life ==
Willem Leushuis' brother, Hans Leushuis, is also a former professional footballer. Hans played for Willem II and VVV-Venlo.
