= Brian Campman =

Dutch footballer (born 1999)

Personal information
- Date of birth: 12 December 1999 (age 26)
- Place of birth: Duiven, Netherlands
- Position: Midfielder

Team information
- Current team: IJsselmeervogels
- Number: 8

Youth career
- –2014: DVV Duiven
- 2014–2016: SML
- 2017–2019: NEC

Senior career*
| Years | Team | Apps | (Gls) |
| 2016–2017 | Achilles '29 II | 22 | (2) |
| 2017 | Achilles '29 | 1 | (0) |
| 2019–2021 | OSS '20 | 23 | (2) |
| 2021–2023 | De Treffers | 64 | (10) |
| 2023–2024 | 1. FC Bocholt | 17 | (1) |
| 2024–2025 | SG Barockstadt | 39 | (2) |
| 2025– | IJsselmeervogels | 22 | (0) |
- * Club domestic league appearances and goals as of 19:02, 24 September 2026 (UTC)

Brian Campman (born 12 December 1999) is a Dutch footballer who plays as a midfielder for Tweede Divisie club IJsselmeervogels.

== Club career ==
He made his professional debut in the Eerste Divisie for Achilles '29 on 18 November 2016 in a game against FC Oss.

In the summer 2017, Campman joined NEC. He started out at the U19 squad.

In May 2023, it was announced that Campman had joined Regionalliga West club 1. FC Bocholt ahead of the new season. On 12 July 2024, he was announced as SG Barockstadt's new signing ahead of the 2024–25 Regionalliga Südwest season.

On 6 November 2025, Campman returned to the Netherlands, where he signed with Tweede Divisie club IJsselmeervogels.
