= Ton Verkerk =

Dutch footballer

Personal information
- Full name: Antonius Verkerk
- Date of birth: 15 March 1955 (age 71)
- Place of birth: The Hague, Netherlands
- Position: Goalkeeper

Senior career*
Years	Team	Apps	(Gls)
1973–1977	FC Den Bosch		
1978–1979	K. Beringen F.C.		
1979–1988	Willem II		

Managerial career
- 2004–2007: RKC Waalwijk (assistant)
- 2007–2009: VV DOVO
- 2015–2016: RKC Waalwijk (assistant)
- 2018: FC Aarau
- * Club domestic league appearances and goals

Ton Verkerk (born 15 March 1955) is a Dutch former football player and manager who played as a goalkeeper.
