= Thomas Beekman (footballer) =

Dutch footballer (born 2000)

Personal information
- Date of birth: 23 January 2000 (age 26)
- Place of birth: Arnhem, Netherlands
- Height: 1.87 m (6 ft 2 in)
- Position: Midfielder

Team information
- Current team: WV-HEDW

Youth career
- –2010: SML
- 2010–2013: Vitesse/AGOVV
- 2013–2019: Vitesse
- 2019–2020: NEC

Senior career*
Years	Team	Apps	(Gls)
2016–2019	Jong Vitesse	12	(1)
2020–2022	NEC	28	(3)
2022	→ Helmond Sport (loan)	17	(3)
2022–2023	TOP Oss	12	(0)
2023–2026	IJsselmeervogels	69	(17)
2026	→ AFC (loan)	5	(0)
2026–	WV-HEDW		
- * Club domestic league appearances and goals as of 09:55, 25 September 2026 (UTC)

Thomas Beekman (born 23 January 2000) is a Dutch professional footballer who plays as a midfielder for WV-HEDW.

== Career ==
=== Early years ===
Born in Arnhem, Beekman started his career in the youth department of SML Arnhem, before moving to the Vitesse academy at age 11. He made his debut for the reserve team on 3 December 2016 in the Tweede Divisie match against Excelsior Maassluis, replacing Levi van der Spek in the 63rd minute. In 2019, he moved to the youth department of NEC – the fierce rivals of Vitesse.

=== NEC ===
In the summer of 2020, Beekman was promoted to the first team of NEC by manager Rogier Meijer and was given jersey number 12. On 11 September, he made his debut for NEC in the Eerste Divisie in the 2–1 win against Jong Ajax. Six minutes before the final he came on for Elayis Tavşan. On 20 October, he scored his first goal for the club. As a substitute, he saved a point in the 1–1 away match against Jong PSV. On 23 May 2021, Beekman won promotion to the Eredivisie with NEC, by beating NAC Breda 1–2 in the final of the play-offs.

==== Loan to Helmond Sport ====
On 14 January 2022, Beekman joined Helmond Sport on loan until the end of the season.

=== TOP Oss ===
On 25 June 2022, Beekman joined TOP Oss on a one-year deal.

=== IJsselmeervogels ===
On 5 July 2023, Beekman signed a two-year contract with IJsselmeervogels in the fourth-tier Derde Divisie. He was loaned to AFC in January 2026.

=== Later career ===
In September 2026, Beekman joined amateur club WV-HEDW, citing a desire to rediscover his enjoyment of football after a period without a club.

== Career statistics ==
=== Club ===
As of 7 August 2021

Club	Season	League			Cup		Other		Total	
Club	Season	Division	Apps	Goals	Apps	Goals	Apps	Goals	Apps	Goals
Jong Vitesse	2016–17	Tweede Divisie	4	0	—		—		4	0
Jong Vitesse	2017–18	Tweede Divisie	0	0	—		—		0	0
Jong Vitesse	2018–19	Tweede Divisie	8	1	—		—		8	1
Jong Vitesse	Total		12	1	—		—		12	1
NEC	2020–21	Eerste Divisie	27	3	2	1	3 (Note: Appearance(s) in Eerste Divisie promotion play-offs)	0	32	2
NEC	2021–22	Eredivisie	0	0	0	0	—		0	0
NEC	Total		27	3	2	1	3	0	32	3
Career total			39	4	2	1	3	0	44	4
