= Rob McDonald =

English footballer (born 1959)

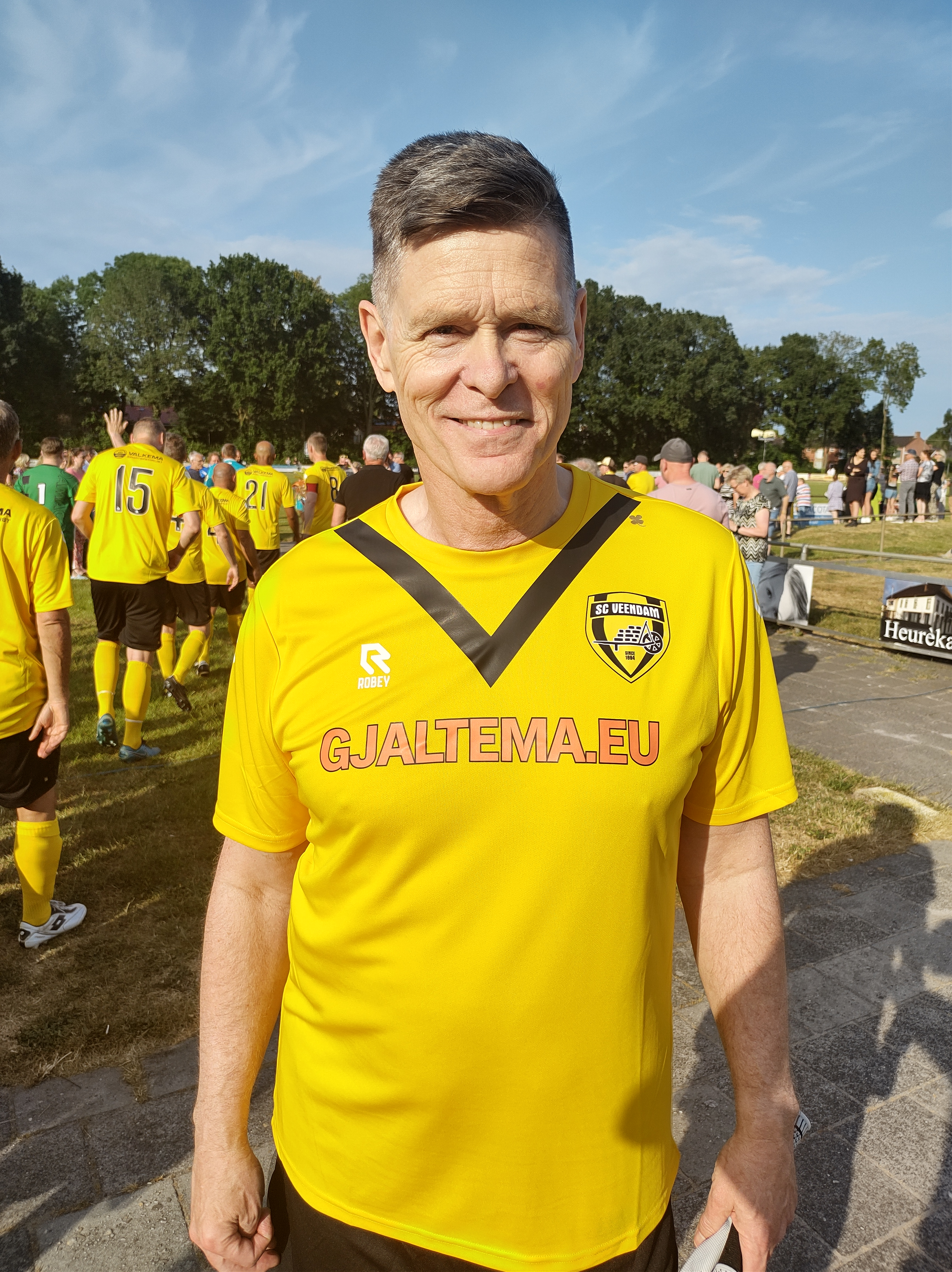

Personal information
- Full name: Robert Roderick McDonald
- Date of birth: 22 January 1959 (age 67)
- Place of birth: Hull, England
- Positions: Striker; midfielder

Senior career*
Years	Team	Apps	(Gls)
1977–1979	Hull City	25	(2)
1979–1980	→ Cambuur (loan)	9	(3)
1980–1981	FC Wageningen	15	(7)
1981–1982	Willem II	33	(17)
1982–1985	Groningen	86	(41)
1985–1986	PSV Eindhoven	24	(15)
1986	→ Sporting CP (loan)	6	(1)
1986–1987	→ Groningen (loan)	12	(1)
1987	Racing Jet Bruxelles	14	(3)
1987–1988	Ikast FS	2	(0)
1988–1989	Newcastle United	10	(1)
1989	Beşiktaş	1	(0)
1989–1992	BV Veendam	48	(14)
Total		285	(104)

Managerial career
- 1997–1999: DOVO
- 1999–2000: De Graafschap
- 2001–2002: Ajax Cape Town
- 2002–2003: Cambuur
- 2003–2004: VVOG
- 2006–2007: Sligo Rovers
- 2007–2008: AS Trenčín
- 2010: DOVO (interim)
- 2013–2014: VV Nunspeet
- * Club domestic league appearances and goals

Robert Roderick McDonald (born 22 January 1959) is an English former professional footballer who played as a striker or midfielder for Hull City, SC Cambuur, FC Wageningen, Willem II Tilburg, FC Groningen, PSV Eindhoven, Sporting Clube de Portugal, Racing Jet de Bruxelles, Ikast FS, Newcastle United, Beşiktaş and BV Veendam.

McDonald also enjoyed a career in football management, with DOVO, De Graafschap, Ajax Cape Town, SC Cambuur, VVOG, Sligo Rovers and AS Trenčín. As manager of Sligo Rovers, McDonald tried to sell Séamus Coleman whom he did not rate as a footballer. McDonald was sacked shortly afterwards and barely two seasons later Coleman was signed by English Premier League side Everton whom he would go on to captain as well as becoming captain of the Republic of Ireland national team.

He returned at amateurs DOVO, based in Veenendaal, in April 2010, accepting an offer to become the club's interim coach until the end of the season. He joined amateurs VV Nunspeet in January 2013, and stayed with the club on the following season as well; in November 2013, it was confirmed he would leave the club by the end of the season.

== Honors ==
PSV Eindhoven

- Eredivisie: 1985-86
