= Milan Hilderink =

Dutch footballer (born 2002)

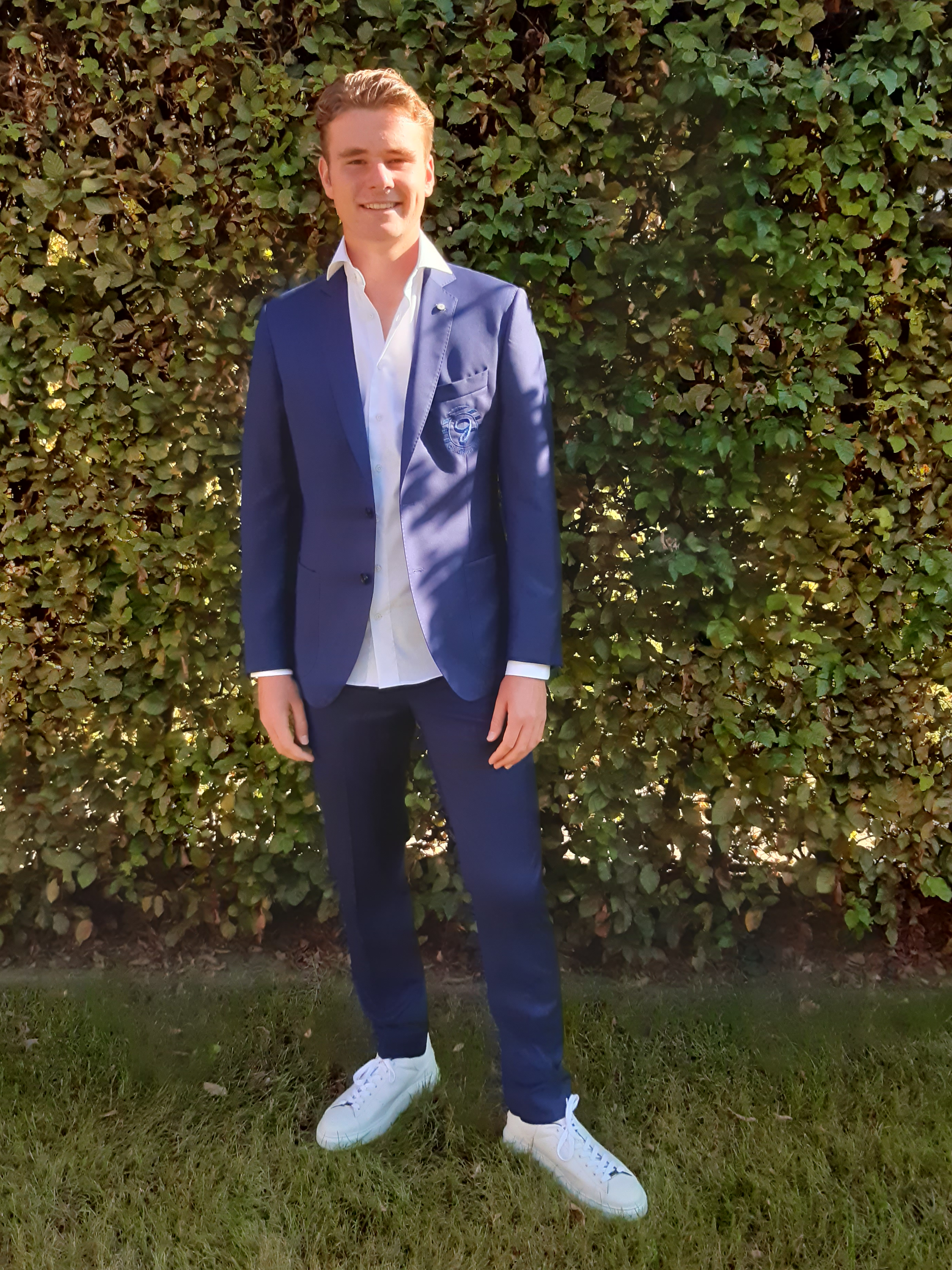

Personal information
- Date of birth: 29 September 2002 (age 24)
- Place of birth: Steenderen, Netherlands
- Height: 1.87 m (6 ft 2 in)
- Position: Centre-back

Team information
- Current team: SV Basteom

Youth career
- SV Steenderen
- FC Zutphen
- 2012–2019: De Graafschap

Senior career*
Years	Team	Apps	(Gls)
2019–2023	De Graafschap	13	(0)
2022–2023	→ TOP Oss (loan)	25	(0)
2023–2025	Manchego Ciudad Real	16	(2)
- * Club domestic league appearances and goals as of 19:51, 13 February 2024 (UTC)

Milan Hilderink (born 29 September 2002) is a Dutch footballer who plays as a centre-back for Dutch amateur side SV Basteom.

== Club career ==
In 2019, Hilderink signed a two-year professional contract with De Graafschap. He made his professional debut on 23 August 2019 in the match against FC Volendam after replacing Gregor Breinburg in the 83rd minute.

Hilderink signed another contract extension in August 2021, keeping him part of De Graafschap until 2023.

On 21 June 2022, Hilderink was sent on a one-season loan to league rivals TOP Oss.

On 15 July 2023, Hilderink signed with Manchego Ciudad Real in the Spanish fourth-tier Segunda Federación. He announced his departure from the club in June 2025. He then returned to his hometown Steenderen to play for lower league SV Basteom.
