= Silvan Gönitzer =

Swiss footballer (born 1996)

Personal information
- Full name: Silvan Roger Gönitzer
- Date of birth: 29 August 1996 (age 30)
- Place of birth: Lachen, Switzerland
- Height: 1.80 m (5 ft 11 in)
- Position: Left back

Team information
- Current team: FC Weesen
- Number: 3

Youth career
- FC Weesen
- Rapperswil-Jona
- FC Zürich
- 2014–2017: FC St. Gallen

Senior career*
| Years | Team | Apps | (Gls) |
| 2017–2020 | St. Gallen | 9 | (0) |
| 2018–2019 | → Rapperswil-Jona (loan) | 10 | (0) |
| 2019 | → Schaffhausen (loan) | 8 | (0) |
| 2020– | FC Weesen | | |
- * Club domestic league appearances and goals as of 13:29, 19 July 2019 (UTC)

Silvan Roger Gönitzer (born 29 August 1996) is a Swiss professional footballer who plays as a defender for FC Weesen.

== Professional career ==
On 20 July 2017, Gönitzer signed his first professional contract with FC St. Gallen. He made his professional debut for St. Gallen in a 1–0 Swiss Super League win over FC Lugano on 16 August 2017.

On 31 January 2020, Gönitzer returned to Swiss amateur club FC Weesen, which he played for as a youth player.
