= Dylan Chiazor =

Dutch footballer

Personal information
- Date of birth: 3 January 1998 (age 28)
- Place of birth: Amsterdam, Netherlands
- Position: Winger

Team information
- Current team: USV Hercules
- Number: 22

Youth career
- VVZA Amersfoort
- VV Hooglanderveen
- 2008–2010: Ajax
- 2010–2012: PEC Zwolle
- 2012–2014: IJsselmeervogels
- 2014–2016: Almere City

Senior career*
Years	Team	Apps	(Gls)
2016–2019	IJsselmeervogels	40	(3)
2019–2020	De Graafschap	0	(0)
2020–2022	Leiknir	7	(0)
2022	Throttur	0	(0)
2023–2024	GVVV	5	(0)
2024–	Hercules	27	(2)
- * Club domestic league appearances and goals as of 20:43, 4 August 2025 (UTC)

Dylan Chiazor (born 3 January 1998) is a Dutch footballer who plays as a winger for USV Hercules.

== Career ==
Born in Amersfoort, Chiazor started his youth career at VVZA Amersfoort, before joining VV Hooglanderveen. He then moved to the academy of Ajax before moving to PEC Zwolle in 2010 and he signed for IJsselmeervogels for 3 years in 2012. His next club was Almere City FC whom he played for between 2014 and 2016, before signing for IJsselmeervogels in 2016. In the summer of 2019, he signed for Eerste Divisie club De Graafschap on a one-year contract following a trial period at the club. He made his debut only appearance for De Graafschap on 29 October 2019 in a 2–0 KNVB Cup defeat to fellow Eerste Divisie club SBV Vitesse. He initially returned to IJsselmeervogels in the summer of 2020 following a one-year spell at De Graafschap, but instead chose to move to Icelandic club Leiknir Reykjavík in August 2020.

After a short spell at Throttur, Chiazor returned to Holland to play for GVVV in the 2023–24 season, then moved to fellow amateur side USV Hercules.
