= Levi Opdam =

Dutch footballer

Personal information
- Date of birth: 3 May 1996 (age 30)
- Place of birth: Alkmaar, Netherlands
- Height: 1.72 m (5 ft 8 in)
- Position: Right back

Youth career
- SV Koedijk
- AZ

Senior career*
Years	Team	Apps	(Gls)
2016–2018	AZ	1	(0)
2016–2018	Jong AZ	35	(4)
2018	→ Go Ahead Eagles (loan)	8	(0)
2019	Paris Saint-Germain B	10	(0)
2019–2020	TOP Oss	7	(0)
2022–2023	SV Zwaluwen Wierden		
- * Club domestic league appearances and goals as of 02:01, 25 January 2020 (UTC)

Levi Opdam (born 3 May 1996) is a Dutch professional footballer who plays as a right back. Besides the Netherlands, he has played in France.

== Career ==
In January 2019, Opdam signed a five-month contract with Paris Saint-Germain. He left the club on 22 August 2019, to join TOP Oss. However, the club announced on 9 January 2020, that his contract had been terminated by mutual agreement.

As of April 2021, Opdam was working at a bed factory and hoping to return to professional football.
