= Tim van de Berg =

Dutch footballer

Personal information
- Date of birth: 23 November 1997 (age 28)
- Place of birth: Maarssen, Netherlands
- Height: 1.89 m (6 ft 2 in)
- Positions: Centre back; defensive midfielder

Team information
- Current team: DVS '33
- Number: 3

Youth career
- OSM '75
- Elinkwijk

Senior career*
Years	Team	Apps	(Gls)
2015–2016	Elinkwijk		
2016–2019	Heracles	6	(0)
2019–2021	DHSC		
2021–2023	DVS '33	62	(2)
2023–2024	Excelsior '31		
2024–	DVS '33	28	(1)
- * Club domestic league appearances and goals as of 11 January 2026

Tim van de Berg (born 23 November 1997) is a Dutch professional footballer who plays as a centre back for Derde Divisie club DVS '33.

== Club career ==
He made his professional debut in the Eredivisie for Heracles Almelo on 18 February 2017 in a game against Excelsior.
