= Ralph Vos =

Dutch footballer (born 1996)

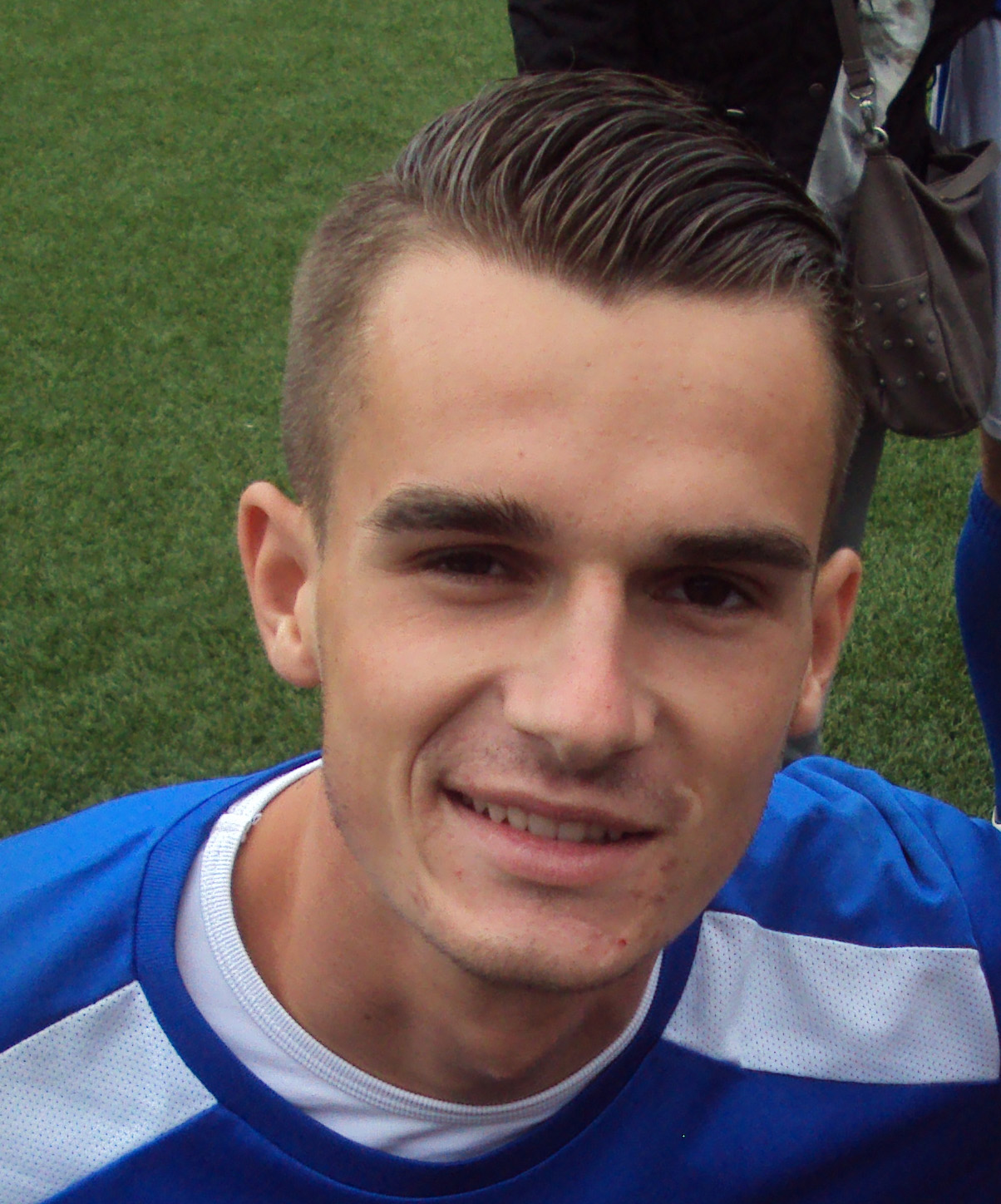
- Vos with Den Bosch in 2016

Personal information
- Date of birth: 1 October 1996 (age 30)
- Place of birth: Geffen, Netherlands
- Height: 1.94 m (6 ft 4 in)
- Position: Goalkeeper

Team information
- Current team: Rosmalen
- Number: 16

Youth career
- 2002–2008: VV Nooit Gedacht
- 2008–2009: RKSV Margriet
- 2009–2013: Willem II/RKC Waalwijk
- 2013–2014: Willem II

Senior career*
Years	Team	Apps	(Gls)
2014–2016	RKC Waalwijk	27	(0)
2016–2017	Den Bosch	0	(0)
2017–2018	FC Oss	0	(0)
2018–2019	OSS '20	10	(0)
2019–2020	Blauw Geel '38	22	(0)
2020–2023	UDI '19	42	(0)
2024–	Rosmalen	0	(0)
- * Club domestic league appearances and goals as of 14:29, 6 October 2024 (UTC)

Ralph Vos (born 1 October 1996) is a Dutch footballer who plays as a goalkeeper for Rosmalen.

== Club career ==
He made his professional debut in the Eerste Divisie for RKC Waalwijk on 16 March 2015 in a game against FC Oss.
