= Jonathan Vergara Berrio =

Dutch footballer (born 1999)

Personal information
- Date of birth: 7 January 1999 (age 27)
- Place of birth: Doetinchem, Netherlands
- Height: 1.77 m (5 ft 10 in)
- Positions: Attacking midfielder; winger

Team information
- Current team: TEC
- Number: 43

Youth career
- VIOD
- De Graafschap

Senior career*
Years	Team	Apps	(Gls)
2019–2022	De Graafschap	14	(0)
2022–2025	GVVV	72	(12)
2025–	TEC	10	(0)
- * Club domestic league appearances and goals as of 21:14, 20 October 2025 (UTC)

Jonathan Vergara Berrio (born 7 January 1999) is a Dutch footballer who plays as a midfielder for TEC.

== Career ==
Vergara Berrio signed his first professional contract with the club in July 2019 for two years with the option of a further year. He made his debut for the club on 28 February 2020 in a 5–1 victory over Jong AZ, with Vergara Berrio praised for his performance.

In November 2022, Vergara Berrio signed for Derde Divisie club GVVV on a contract until 2024.
