= Jurre Vreman =

Dutch footballer

Personal information
- Date of birth: 20 February 1998 (age 28)
- Place of birth: Gendringen, Netherlands
- Height: 1.89 m (6 ft 2 in)
- Position: Centre-back

Team information
- Current team: Woezik

Youth career
- –2016: De Graafschap

Senior career*
Years	Team	Apps	(Gls)
2016–2019	De Graafschap	2	(0)
2016–2019	Jong De Graafschap	46	(1)
2019–	Woezik		
- * Club domestic league appearances and goals as of 10 June 2019

Jurre Vreman (born 20 February 1998) is a Dutch professional footballer who plays for Woezik as a centre-back.

== Club career ==
Vreman is a youth exponent from De Graafschap. He made his professional debut on 5 August 2016 in an Eerste Divisie game against FC Eindhoven.
