= Roland Baas =

Dutch footballer (born 1996)

Personal information
- Date of birth: 2 March 1996 (age 30)
- Place of birth: Winschoten, Netherlands
- Height: 1.78 m (5 ft 10 in)
- Position: Left-back

Team information
- Current team: DVS '33
- Number: 5

Youth career
- –2008: WVV 1896
- 2008–2017: VA FC Groningen/Cambuur

Senior career*
Years	Team	Apps	(Gls)
2014–2017	Groningen	1	(0)
2016–2017	Jong Groningen	26	(1)
2017–2018	Heracles Almelo	14	(0)
2018–2019	Go Ahead Eagles	37	(1)
2019–2023	De Graafschap	66	(0)
2023	Castellón	7	(0)
2023–	DVS '33	63	(1)

International career
2014	Netherlands U19	1	(0)
2015	Netherlands U20	2	(0)
- * Club domestic league appearances and goals as of 11 January 2026

Roland Baas (born 2 March 1996) is a Dutch professional footballer who plays as a left-back for Derde Divisie club DVS '33.

== Club career ==
=== Early career ===
Born in Winschoten, started his career in the youth academy of amateur club WVV 1896 before joining the academy of FC Groningen in 2008.

=== FC Groningen ===
He made his professional debut in the Eredivisie for FC Groningen on 5 October 2014 in a game against Feyenoord. He signed his first professional on 27 January 2015, signing with the club for one-and-a-half seasons. He made just one appearance for the club during the 2014–15 season, and would not appear for them at all during the 2015–16 season. He did not appear for them in the 2016–17 season either, but did appear 26 times for Jong FC Groningen, scoring once. It was announced he would leave FC Groningen at the end of the 2016–17 season.

=== Heracles Almelo ===
On 15 August 2017, Baas joined Heracles Almelo on trial, before signing a one-year contract with the club later that month. He made his debut for the club on 25 October 2017 against HSV Hoek in the KNVB Cup, before making his league debut for the club on 9 December 2017 in a 5–0 league defeat at AZ Alkmaar. He made 14 appearances in the Eredivisie for Heracles Almelo during the 2017–18 season, though he did not score.

=== Go Ahead Eagles ===
On 5 June 2018, Baas signed for Eerste Divisie club Go Ahead Eagles on a one-year contract after his contract at Heracles Almelo was not renewed. He made his debut for the club on 17 August 2018 in a 5–0 win at home to Jong FC Utrecht. He was a regular player for Go Ahead Eagles during the 2018–19 season, making 37 appearances and scoring once during the regular season, before making 4 appearances in the promotion play-offs as Go Ahead Eagles narrowly missed out on promotion.

=== De Graafschap ===
Having rejected the offer of a new contract with Go Ahead Eagles, Baas signed for Eerste Divisie side De Graafschap on a free transfer in June 2019, signing a two-year contract with the club. He made his debut for the club on 9 August 2019 before going on to make 11 appearances for the club during the 2019–20 season.

== International career ==
He has played for the Netherlands at under-19 and under-20 levels.
