= Robin Voets =

Dutch footballer (born 2001)

Personal information
- Date of birth: 13 April 2001 (age 25)
- Place of birth: Erp, Netherlands
- Height: 1.85 m (6 ft 1 in)
- Position: Centre-back

Team information
- Current team: Blauw Geel '38
- Number: 3

Youth career
- RKVV Erp
- Den Bosch

Senior career*
| Years | Team | Apps | (Gls) |
| 2018–2019 | Jong Den Bosch | 31 | (4) |
| 2019–2021 | Den Bosch | 11 | (0) |
| 2021– | Blauw Geel '38 | 115 | (13) |
- * Club domestic league appearances and goals as of 18:05, 4 August 2025 (UTC)

Robin Voets (born 13 April 2001) is a Dutch footballer who plays as a centre-back for Blauw Geel '38.

== Career ==
Born in Erp, Voets started his career in the youth of RKVV Erp, before moving to the FC Den Bosch academy, where he was included in the first-team squad for a few matches in the Eerste Divisie for the 2018–19 season, while appearing for the U21 team in the Hoofdklasse. He made his senior debut the following season, in the 1–1 home match against FC Eindhoven on 23 August 2019. In the match, he came on as a substitute for Danny Verbeek in the 83rd minute.

On 23 May 2021, it was announced that Voets had signed with Blauw Geel '38, a club competing in the Derde Divisie.
