= VV DOVO =

Dutch football club

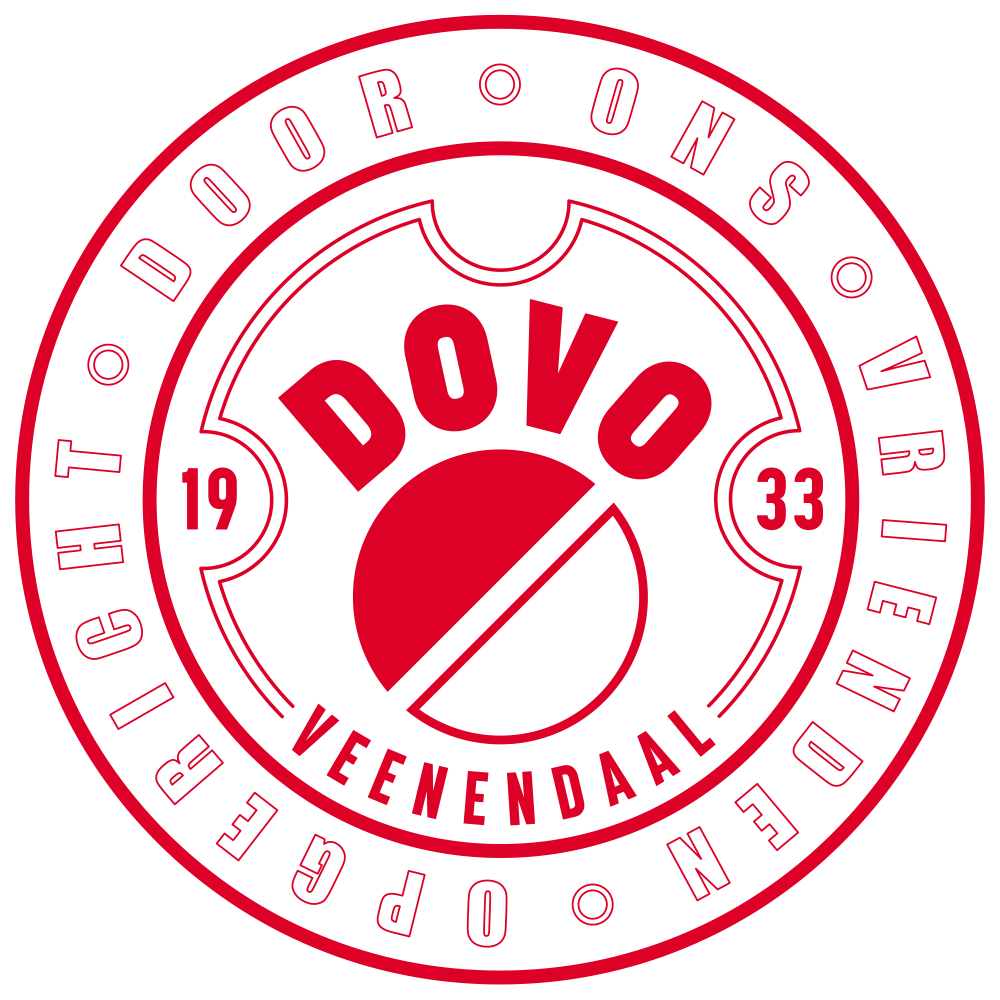
- Full name: Voetbalvereniging Door Ons Vrienden Opgericht
- Founded: 1933
- Ground: Sportpark Panhuis, Veenendaal
- Capacity: 4,500
- Chairman: Bert Septer
- Manager: Jeroen van Bezouwen
- League: Derde Divisie
- 2025–26: Derde Divisie A, 8th of 18
Home colours	Away colours

Voetbalvereniging Door Ons Vrienden Opgericht ("Football Club Founded By Our Friends"), commonly known as DOVO, is a football club from Veenendaal, Netherlands.

== History ==
The club was founded in 1933 as DVO and later changed its name to DOVO to set itself apart from a nearby club with an identical name. DOVO won section championships in lower leagues in 1936, 1937,1938, 1948, 1949, 1958, 1960, and 1967.

In 1970, DOVO promoted to the Eerste Klasse, where it initially won sections in 1975, 1977, 1979, 1989, 1991, and 1994. In 1974, it drew national attention by beating NSVV from Numansdorp, 11–0, while pointing out that DOVO players had made mistakes. In 1979, it also became the Saturday Champion of the Netherlands. From 1996 to 2017 it played in the Hoofdklasse, except for two seasons back in the Eerste when it took Eerste Klasse championships (2007 and 2011). In 1999 and 2004 DOVO won section championships in the Hoofdklasse. Since 2017, DOVO plays in the Derde Divisie.

In 2023, DOVO qualified for the Tweede Divisie promotion playoffs. However, they lost 5–3 on aggregate to VVSB in the first round.

== Head coaches ==
- Ries Hol (1964–1971)
- Nico van Miltenburg (1971–1973)
- Eli Voskamp (1973–1974)
- Jan de Bouter (1974–1976)
- Evert Mur (1976–1977)
- Jan de Jongh (1977–1984)
- Jan de Bouter (1985)
- Pierre Stevenaart (1985–1986)
- Jan Rab (1986–1989)
- Frans Vermeulen (1989–1991)
- Wim Eilander (1991–1994)
- Peter Boeve (1994–1995)
- Jan Rab (1995–1997)
- Rob McDonald (1997–1999)
- Bert van Sas (1999–2000)
- Jos Broers (2000–2002)
- Kees Oostermeijer (2002–2003)
- Henny Lee (2003–2005)
- Henne Oostermeijer (2005–2006)
- Raymond Verheijen (2006–2007)
- Rob McDonald (2007)
- Ton Verkerk (2007–2008)
- Koos Waslander (2009–2010)
- Rob McDonald (2010)
- Peter Visee (2010–2014)
- Jeroen Peters (2014–2016; tech. mgr. Hans Kraay Jr.)
- Bert van Sas (2016)
- Gert Kruys (2016–2019)
- Scott Calderwood (2019–2021)
- Florian Wolf (2021–2023)
- Jeroen van Bezouwen (2023–present)

== Relations with other teams ==
In 2012, DOVO signed a partnership agreement with SBV Vitesse. This agreement was amended and renewed, for indefinite duration, in 2019.

DOVO has a rivalry with another Veenendaal football club, GVVV. In 2019, an indoors game between the clubs was ended after several physical fights.

== DOVO in the KNVB Cup ==
This shows the results from DOVO against professional footballclubs in the KNVB Cup.

Season	Round	Match	Result
1975/76	1st Round	SC Amersfoort - DOVO	2-2 (3-4 n.s.)
1977/78	2nd Round	DOVO - BV Veendam	0–3
1979/80	2nd Round	DOVO - PEC Zwolle	1–4
1982/83	1st Round	DOVO - Helmond Sport	2–3
1983/84	1st Round	DOVO - Fortuna Sittard	2–4
1984/85	1st Round	DOVO - AFC Ajax	0–5
1987/88	1st Round	DOVO - FC Twente	0–7
1988/89	1st Round	DOVO - VVV	3–5
1989/90	1st Round	DOVO - Go Ahead Eagles	1-1 (1-2 n.s.)
1991/92	1st Round	BV Veendam - DOVO	3–1
1992/93	2nd Round	DOVO - AZ Alkmaar	0–3
1994/95	Group 4	DOVO - Go Ahead Eagles	1–7
1994/95	Group 4	DOVO - FC Zwolle	1–2
1996/97	Group 4	DOVO - FC Zwolle	3-2
1996/97	Group 4	Vitesse - DOVO	8–0
1999/00	Group 18	DOVO - VVV	2-2
1999/00	Group 18	Helmond Sport - DOVO	5–1
2001/02	Group 8	DOVO - Willem II	0–3
2001/02	2nd Round	RBC Roosendaal - DOVO	3–0
2015/16	1st round	DOVO - Willem II	0–3
