= IJsselmeervogels =

Dutch football club

- Full name: Voetbalvereniging; IJsselmeervogels
- Nicknames: De Rooien (The Reds); De Vogels (The Birds)
- Founded: 6 June 1932; 94 years ago
- Ground: Sportpark De Westmaat, Bunschoten
- Capacity: 6,000
- Chairman: Ruud van Diermen
- Manager: Willem Leushuis
- League: Tweede Divisie
- 2025–26: Tweede Divisie, 16th of 18
Home colours	Away colours

IJsselmeervogels (Dutch pronunciation: [ˌɛisəlˈmeːrˌvoːɣəls]) is a Dutch football club from Spakenburg, in the province of Utrecht. Founded on 6 June 1932, the club plays its home matches at Sportpark De Westmaat. Nicknamed De Rooien ("the Reds"), IJsselmeervogels is one of the most decorated amateur clubs in the Netherlands, having won the overall Dutch amateur championship seven times (a national record shared with VV Katwijk). The club competes in the Tweede Divisie, the third tier of Dutch football and the top level for amateur sides. IJsselmeervogels' long-standing local rivalry with SV Spakenburg—their neighbours and co-tenants at De Westmaat—is contested in the Derby van Spakenburg.

== History ==
=== Early years ===
The club was formed in 1932. In its early days, it had a number of different names, including VVIJV, V.V. IJsselmeer and n.a.s. (Na Arbeid Sport, Sport after Labour) and soon the club colors of red and white were adopted. The kit consists of a white shirt with deep red centre (reminiscent of Ajax) and red shorts. The socks were initially red with a white stripe, but in recent years have gradually changed to become all-white.

IJsselmeervogels first played in a regional federation in Utrecht, but always played in the highest possible class in the district, and not without success; nearly every year they competed for the title against local rivals SV Spakenburg and regional clubs like HSV De Zuidvogels and SV Huizen. IJsselmeervogels won several titles and cups in the 1950s and 1960s, including the Championship. After the sixties, the KNVB created a national amateur competition, the First Class (Eerste Klasse). Promotion proved more difficult than expected, but after a play-off with VRC and VV Rijsoord, IJsselmeervogels secured a place in the Erste Klasse.

Rival club SV Spakenburg were also promoted to the First Class. It was then that IJsselmeervogels moved to the same complex as Spakenburg and since then only the canteens, a fence and some trees have separated the two clubs. In IJsselmeervogels' second season in the new division, 1971/72, the club became champions, repeating the feat in 72/73.

=== 1975: Sports team of the year ===
IJsselmeervogels gained national fame in the 1974/75 season for their excellent run in KNVB Cup, starting with wins over SV Limburgia and SC Amersfoort (the former professional club from the nearby large town). Subsequently, IJsselmeervogels won their match against FC Groningen, then leaders of the Eerste Divisie, 2–1, and reached the quarter-finals.

In March 1975, IJsselmeervogels played away in against AZ Alkmaar, then 5th in the Eredivisie. AZ fielded celebrated players like Kees Kist and Hugo Hovenkamp, but Jan Vedder and Jaan de Graaf gave the amateurs a 0–2 lead. AZ came back to equalise, but neither side could find the net during extra time, so the match had to be decided on penalty kicks. Thanks to saves by goalkeeper Jos de Feyter, IJsselmeervogels reached the semi-finals.

Singer Peter Koelewijn of 'Peter en zijn Rockets' composed songs for IJsselmeervogels, sung by the players: Vogels van het IJsselmeer (Birds of the IJsselmeer) "Alle Vogels vliegen" ("All Birds fly").

This victory is considered the high point in the club's history and was celebrated in the village. In the semi-finals, FC Twente proved far too strong, winning 6–0. Following this improbable cup run, IJsselmeervogels received the 'Dutch Sports team of the year' award. IJsselmeervogels are the only amateur club ever to win this prize.

=== 1976–1989 ===
During the remainder of the 1970s and 1980s, IJsselmeervogels were crowned champions a number of times. In 1976, 1977 and 1983, playing largely against teams from the own village, IJsselmeervogels won three national titles. At the end of the 1980s, the club went through a difficult period. The club veered between using players from their own town and drafting in players from other parts of the country. There was a change in policy around 1988. IJsselmeervogels started to pay their previously unpaid players, as some other amateur clubs already did. This lack of success in this period caused discontent among supporters, even leading to riots on occasion.

=== 1990s ===
In the mid-1990s the board appointed Erik Assink as coach. He inherited a team with some young home grown players supplemented by a few veterans. In 1995, IJsselmeervogels won all amateur titles. The largely unchanged squad also won the Saturday titles in 1998 and 1999, after which the club slowly built a new team, which took several years.

=== 2000s ===
From 2003, after attracting five players from then-champions but nearly bankrupt SV Huizen, performances were improving. With Philip den Haan joining as manager, results improved further, culminating in winning the Saturday league championship. ASWH and Excelsior '31 were, however, too strong, with the former becoming overall champions.

In the 2005–2006 season, IJsselmeervogels became the overall amateur champions for the fifth time in their history. Under the guidance of coach Willem Leushuis they won the amateur title again, finishing far ahead of competitors ASWH, VV SHO and GVVV. Dogan Corneille, their leader in midfield and a former professional player, used his experience to guide the team and raise overall standards. First team players from Spakenburg were left-back Henri de Graaf and right-back Jan Pieter Hartog. After winning the league title, IJsselmeervogels had to play ONS Sneek and Rijnsburgse Boys. In this competition IJsselmeervogels narrowly won the title, with the match against Rijnsburgse Boys being particularly close. Eventually, penalty shootouts made the difference and gave IJsselmeervogels their thirteenth Saturday title. On 17 June 2006, IJsselmeervogels was crowned the best amateur club in the Netherlands for the first time in 11 years, securing the overall amateur title with a 0–3 win away at Türkiyemspor following a 1–2 defeat in the first leg. After this success, some players were picked up by professional clubs. Kwong-Wah Steinrath, the top scorer, was signed by Haarlem and defender Stanley Tailor left IJsselmeervogels for FC Emmen. The most notable transfer was that of left winger Gijs van Manen, who had mostly been on the bench only a year earlier at SDV Barneveld. He went on to play in the reserves of FC Utrecht.

In 2006–2007 IJsselmeervogels again had a strong squad. Dogan Corneille, who had been so important for the team the previous season, was replaced by Kevin Winter, and his brother Jeffrey Winter replaced Steinraht as a striker. He scored no fewer than 26 goals in 25 League matches. In mid-November coach Willem Leushuis suddenly announced his retirement, having received an offer he could not refuse from Kuwait. His successor, Cees Lok, came at the right time. His first League game was a 1–2 win against rivals Spakenburg. Later in the season, in February, the new all-seater covered stand, seating up to 1,050 spectators, was opened. On 21 April 2007 at home, IJsselmeervogels won the league title for the third time in a row, beating neighbours Spakenburg were with goals from Dennis van der Steen and Jeffrey Winter. The Saturday title also fell to IJsselmeervogels. With a great display of power, the first 2 games against Rijnsburgse Boys and HHC Hardenberg were won, which meant a draw in their third match would suffice for IJsselmeervogels to win the title. Eventually they won their final game 2–1. However, the overall amateur title didn't go to IJsselmeervogels. At the Westmaat, IJsselmeervogels and SV Argon drew 1–1. At Meidrecht, IJsselmeervogels lost to Argon 4–3 in extra time.

The 2007/2008 season was much less successful. The selection looked stronger up front but had lost quality in midfield. Kwong-Wah Steinraht and Gijs van Manen returned after one-year adventures at HFC Haarlem and FC Utrecht and Joost Kuhlmann and Bryan Simons joined from Rijnsburgse Boys. IJsselmeervogels also signed Mattheus Hoop and Philip van der Kolk as new goalkeepers and got Frits van Putten as a replacement for Kevin Winter, who returned to FC Lisse. Also leaving were Dogan Corneille (BVV Barendrecht), Jaap de Feijter (Veensche Boys), Tom Gesgarz (DOVO), Alexander de Jong, Paul Verboom, Sjoerd van der Waal (all ASWH) and Erwin Schouten (VV Nunspeet). On 15 August 2007, it was announced that coach Cees Lok would make an immediate switch to FC Twente. He joined the technical staff, mainly to deal with Twente's youth squad. As a replacement the experienced Harry van den Ham signed for a year. On 22 September 2007, a record from the 1970s was equalled. IJsselmeervogels went 29 League matches undefeated after beating Bennekom. The last time IJsselmeervogels lost at home during the regular season was 2 April 2005, against SV Deltasport from Vlaardingen. On 24 December, van den Ham was fired and a few days later Roy Wesseling was announced as the new coach. IJsselmeervogels eventually ended in a disappointing fifth position with twelve wins, six draws and eight losses.

2008/2009 brought a thirtieth league title to IJsselmeervogels. With an almost completely new team, including a number of former professional players, led by Roy Wesseling, IJsselmeervogels dominated the Saturday Hoofdklasse B from the first round. The reds were on top of the league from beginning till end. Eventually, the title was won in the away match against SV Geinoord, who thereafter were relegated to the Eerste Klasse. The Saturday amateur Championship was less successful for IJsselmeervogels: in a competition with Rijnsburgse Boys and Harkemase Boys, IJsselmeervogels had to settle for second place.

In the first half of the season 2009/2010, results were not as good. Certain players and coach Roy Wesseling failed to gel. The IJsselmeervogels board fired Wesseling on 22 December 2009. His successor, Jan Zoutman, was officially announced on 29 December. Under Zoutman's leadership, performances improved drastically, and in the second half of the season IJsselmeervogels dropped points in only one game. On Saturday 8 May IJsselmeervogels became league champions for the 31st time and celebrated the 50th championship in the history of the club. Three weeks later, IJsselmeervogels won the overall Saturday title for the 15th time, and the club won its 6th national amateur title by beating VV Gemert twice (0–1 and 4–0).

In the summer of 2008, the supporters club NAS was established. NAS stands for Na Arbeid Sport (Sport After Labour), a former name of IJsselmeervogels. The Supporters club has over 500 members. NAS provides atmosphere at IJsselmeervogels matches, and arranges darts evenings, parties and a wide range of other activities.

=== 2010s ===
From the 2010/2011 season IJsselmeervogels played in the Saturday Topklasse, which in 2016 was renamed the Derde Divisie.

IJsselmeervogels got their first silverware of the season by winning the Super Cup against VV Dongen, winner of the national amateur KNVB Cup. This was the second time the club had won the amateur Super Cup. In the first year of the Topklasse Zaterdag, the title was won with a 5–0 victory over SC Genemuiden on 7 May 2011. Three weeks later, IJsselmeervogels were crowned amateur champions of the Netherlands for the seventh time in their history, with two 2-0 wins over FC Oss (who used their right to be promoted straight to the First Division (Jupiler League).

The 2011/2012 season started with a match against KNVB Cup winners Achilles '29 from Groesbeek. IJsselmeervogels lost 1–2. At the end of the season Achilles '29 became Dutch champions by defeating Saturday champions SV Spakenburg. IJsselmeervogels ended the season in a disappointing sixth place.

The 2012/2013 season also began badly. Coach Jan Zoutman received a red card in the opening match against CVV de Jodan Boys (a 2–1 defeat) for knocking over a linesman. Zoutman was later suspended for three months. Despite poor results, Zoutman's contract was renewed for one year in December. Considering the bad results after the winter holiday, however, the IJsselmeervogels board decided to terminate the manager's contract with five matches to go. Three days after this decision, IJsselmeervogels appointed Gert Kruys as their new head coach. In the 2013/2014 season Kruys appointed Maikel de Harder, a local boy, as captain of IJsselmeervogels. On Saturday 5 May IJsselmeervogels secured themselves a place in the Topklasse Zaterdag, where it also played in 2013/14. IJsselmeervogels ended another disappointing season in twelfth position.

At the end of the 2015/16 season, the club did not qualify for the newly formed Tweede Divisie, the highest amateur level of the Dutch football pyramid. After one season in the Derde Divisie, IJsselmeervogels entered the Tweede Divisie by winning the Saturday championship of the Derde Divisie.

=== 2020s ===
In the 2022–23 season, IJsselmeervogels finished in 16th place, resulting in their participation in the relegation playoffs. After losing 6–0 to USV Hercules in the first leg of the first round, IJsselmeervogels lost 5–0 at home in the return leg, resulting in an 11–0 aggregate defeat. Consequently, IJsselmeervogels were relegated back to the Derde Divisie.

In the 2024–25 season, IJsselmeervogels won promotion back to the Tweede Divisie.

== Current squad ==
As of 25 October 2026

Note: Flags indicate national team as defined under FIFA eligibility rules; some limited exceptions apply. Players may hold more than one non-FIFA nationality.

No.	Pos.	Nation	Player
1	GK	NED	Bram Kaarsgaren
2	DF	NED	Gerwin van de Groep
4	DF	NED	Tom Carbaat
5	DF	NED	Amin Moumouh
6	MF	NED	Jurrian van Eerden
7	FW	NED	Matthijs Hardijk
8	MF	NED	Brian Campman
9	FW	NED	Jim Beers
10	MF	NED	Robin Schulte
11	FW	NED	Arantis Roep
12	MF	NED	Sem Scholten
14	MF	NED	Jordy Ruizendaal
15	DF	NED	Quiermo Dumay

No.	Pos.	Nation	Player
17	MF	NED	Jeffrey van den Dikkenberg
18	FW	NED	Boy Spijkerman
19	DF	NED	Raynish Mangalie
20	GK	NED	Ruben van Kouwen
21	MF	NED	Bastian van Diermen
22	DF	NED	Jesse Schuurman
23	DF	NED	Bjorn van Gorkom
24	FW	ARU	Gello Robertha
27	DF	NED	Jurgen Mattheij
28	DF	NED	Jarno Janssen
29	MF	NED	Riley Reemnet
32	DF	NED	Daniël Beukers (on loan from Volendam)

== Derby IJsselmeervogels – Spakenburg ==
IJsselmeervogels and SV Spakenburg have played at the same level since they were founded. Over the years, an atmosphere has emerged around derby matches which is unique in amateur football. The derby is often depicted as a clash between the club of "the people and the fishermen" (IJsselmeervogels, also known as "The Reds") and the club of "farmers and clerks" (SV spakenburg, "the Blues").

Their rivalry reached boiling point in 1987, when during the penultimate match of the season, a bomb made by an IJsselmeervogels supporter exploded and injured a linesman. The clubs did not play each other again until the mid-1990s. In 1999, however, relations worsened considerably when Spakenburg offered a large sum of money to sign two star players from the Reds' championship team (Gérard van der Nooij and Pascal de Bruijn). The affair became so controversial that the local government banned the derby for years. Since 2002, peace has returned and IJsselmeervogels and Spakenburg once again contest the derby. It is estimated that 16 April 2011 fixture was attended by almost 9,000 people. The media pay considerable attention to the derby, which is covered in sports magazines like Voetbal International and by Dutch national broadcaster NOS.

Besides Spakenburg, IJsselmeervogels have other significant rivals, including SV Urk, VV Sparta Nijker, VV DOVO, SV Huizen and especially Quick Boys of Katwijk. During the 2004/05 season, Quick Boys (former club of Dirk Kuyt) were the most important opponents. On the final matchday, IJsselmeervogels defeated the Katwijk club 3–2 in front of 7,000 spectators.

=== Results of the derby since 1970 (introduction First Class (Eerste Klasse)) ===
Season	Date	First Match	Date	Second Match
1972/73	2 September 1972	IJsselmeervogels – Spakenburg 2–1	2 December 1972	Spakenburg – IJsselmeervogels 2–1
1982/83	8 January 1983	IJsselmeervogels – Spakenburg 1–1	4 April 1983	Spakenburg – IJsselmeervogels 1–1
1985/86	16 November 1985	IJsselmeervogels – Spakenburg 1–1	17 May 1986	Spakenburg – IJsselmeervogels 2–2
1986/87	1 November 1986	IJsselmeervogels – Spakenburg 0–0	9 May 1987	Spakenburg – IJsselmeervogels 1–0
1989/90	9 September 1989	Spakenburg – IJsselmeervogels 0–0	24 February 1990	IJsselmeervogels – Spakenburg 2–4
1992/93	12 December 1992	IJsselmeervogels – Spakenburg 1–0	20 March 1993	Spakenburg – IJsselmeervogels 2–1
1993/94	25 September 1993	Spakenburg – IJsselmeervogels 1–0	19 March 1994	IJsselmeervogels – Spakenburg 3–1
1994/95	5 November 1994	IJsselmeervogels – Spakenburg 0–0	22 April 1995	Spakenburg – IJsselmeervogels 1–1
2002/03	28 September 2002	IJsselmeervogels – Spakenburg 1–2	12 April 2003	Spakenburg – IJsselmeervogels 3–0
2003/04	Oktober 25, 2003	IJsselmeervogels – Spakenburg 0–2	13 March 2004	Spakenburg – IJsselmeervogels 4–1
2004/05	Oktober 23, 2004	Spakenburg – IJsselmeervogels 2–3	12 March 2005	IJsselmeervogels – Spakenburg 1–0
2005/06	5 November 2005	Spakenburg – IJsselmeervogels 0–2	1 April 2006	IJsselmeervogels – Spakenburg 0–0
2006/07	11 November 2006	Spakenburg – IJsselmeervogels 1–2	21 April 2007	IJsselmeervogels – Spakenburg 2–1
2007/08	17 November 2007	IJsselmeervogels – Spakenburg 1–5	26 April 2008	Spakenburg – IJsselmeervogels 7–1
2008/09	13 December 2008	Spakenburg – IJsselmeervogels 1–3	9 May 2009	IJsselmeervogels – Spakenburg 1–1
2009/10	7 November 2009	IJsselmeervogels – Spakenburg 0–2	10 April 2010	Spakenburg – IJsselmeervogels 2–3
2010/11	6 November 2010	Spakenburg – IJsselmeervogels 2–3	16 April 2011	IJsselmeervogels – Spakenburg 3–2
2011/12	8 October 2011	IJsselmeervogels – Spakenburg 2–2	24 March 2012	Spakenburg – IJsselmeervogels 2–1
2012/13	22 September 2012	Spakenburg – IJsselmeervogels 2–1	9 March 2013	IJsselmeervogels – Spakenburg 1–0

	Matches	Won	Draw	Lost	Goals F.	Goals A.	Goal diff.
Spakenburg	38	15	11	13	61	48	+13
IJsselmeervogels	38	13	11	15	48	61	−13

== Honors ==
IJsselmeervogels was founded in 1932 and won their first championship on 17 June 1937. The 30th title was celebrated on 18 April 2009.

Dutch Derde Divisie Saturday (1×)
2017
Dutch Amateur champions (7×)
1976, 1977, 1983, 1995, 2006, 2010, 2011
Dutch Amateur champions Saturday (From 2011 as champions Top Class Saturday (16×)
1954, 1955, 1956, 1964, 1976, 1977, 1982, 1983, 1984, 1995, 1998, 1999, 2006, 2007, 2010, 2011
Dutch Amateur league Saturday champions (31×)
1937, 1946, 1947, 1948, 1954, 1955, 1956, 1957, 1958, 1959, 1964, 1965, 1966, 1968, 1972, 1973, 1976, 1977, 1982, 1983, 1984, 1986, 1988, 1995, 1998, 1999, 2005, 2006, 2007, 2009, 2010
KNVB Cup Amateurs Saturday amateurs (3×)
1957, 1962, 1974
Districts Cup (West 1) (5×)
1981, 1996, 2003, 2014, 2015
National KNVB Cup for amateurs (1×)
1996
Super Cup Amateurs (2×)
2006, 2010
Dutch Sportsteam of the year (1×)
1975

=== IJsselmeervogels league positions by season ===
Season	Competition	Pos.	Matches	Won	Draw	Lost	Points	GF	GA	GD	
2016/2017	Third Division (Derde Divisie) Saturday	1	34	21	7	6	70	74	36	+38	
2015/2016	Top Class (Topklasse)	12	30	8	7	15	31	34	50	−16	
2014/2015	Top Class (Topklasse)	5	30	14	6	10	48	48	40	+8	
2013/2014	Top Class (Topklasse)	4	30	14	8	8	50	62	43	+19	
2012/2013	Top Class (Topklasse)	12	30	10	9	11	39	44	48	−4	
2011/2012	Top Class (Topklasse)	6	30	15	3	12	48	67	50	+17	
2010/2011	Top Class (Topklasse)	1	30	19	5	6	62	68	39	+29	
2009/2010	Head Class (Hoofdklasse) B	1	26	19	3	4	60	64	18	+46	
2008/2009	Head Class (Hoofdklasse) B	1	26	15	9	2	54	59	22	+37	
2007/2008	Head Class (Hoofdklasse) B	5	26	12	6	8	42	53	48	+5	
2006/2007	Head Class (Hoofdklasse) B	1	26	18	5	3	59	65	29	+36	
2005/2006	Head Class (Hoofdklasse) B	1	26	18	3	5	57	58	25	+33	
2004/2005	Head Class (Hoofdklasse) B	1	26	16	4	6	52	46	31	+15	
2003/2004	Head Class (Hoofdklasse) B	2	24	17	2	5	53	53	24	+29	
2002/2003	Head Class (Hoofdklasse) B	5	26	11	7	8	40	37	34	+3	
2001/2002	Head Class (Hoofdklasse) B	8	26	9	9	8	36	39	35	+4	
2000/2001	Head Class (Hoofdklasse) C	9	26	8	6	12	30	36	42	−6	
1999/2000	Head Class (Hoofdklasse) C	6	26	13	3	10	42	39	28	+11	
1998/1999	Head Class (Hoofdklasse) C	1	26	18	5	3	59	61	29	+32	
1997/1998	Head Class (Hoofdklasse) C	1	26	20	4	2	64	59	12	+47	
1996/1997	Head Class (Hoofdklasse) B	3	26	12	7	7	43	38	23	+15	
1995/1996	First Class (Eerste klasse) A	7	26	8	9	9	33	33	40	−7	* since 1995/1996 clubs get 3 instead of 2 points a victory
1994/1995	First Class (Eerste klasse) C	1	26	15	9	2	39	46	18	+28	
1993/1994	First Class (Eerste klasse) B	4	26	11	6	9	28	41	38	+3	
1992/1993	First Class (Eerste klasse) B	7	26	12	3	11	27	42	42	+0	
1991/1992	First Class (Eerste klasse) B	3	26	13	7	6	33	44	22	+22	
1990/1991	First Class (Eerste klasse) A	3	26	12	9	5	33	49	32	+17	
1989/1990	First Class (Eerste klasse) B	8	26	9	7	10	25	39	39	+0	
1988/1989	First Class (Eerste klasse) B	5	26	11	6	9	28	44	34	+10	
1987/1988	First Class (Eerste klasse) A	1	26	17	5	4	39	58	25	+33	
1986/1987	First Class (Eerste klasse) B	3	26	14	6	6	34	48	26	+22	
1985/1986	First Class (Eerste klasse) B	1	26	16	7	3	39	46	19	+27	
1984/1985	First Class (Eerste klasse) B	4	26	11	6	9	28	44	38	+6	
1983/1984	First Class (Eerste klasse) C	1	26	16	5	3	37	71	33	+38	
1982/1983	First Class (Eerste klasse) B	1	26	15	10	1	40	70	41	+29	
1981/1982	First Class (Eerste klasse) B	1	26	15	8	3	38	55	21	+34	
1980/1981	First Class (Eerste klasse) A	5	26	11	5	10	27	31	33	−2	
1979/1980	First Class (Eerste klasse) B	5	26	11	6	9	28	44	27	+17	
1978/1979	First Class (Eerste klasse) A	2	26	13	7	6	33	39	23	+16	
1977/1978	First Class (Eerste klasse) A	4	26	12	6	8	30	42	25	+17	
1976/1977	First Class (Eerste klasse) B	1	26	16	7	3	39	68	22	+46	
1975/1976	First Class (Eerste klasse) B	1	26	18	5	3	41	63	25	+38	
1974/1975	First Class (Eerste klasse) B	2	26	16	5	5	37	35	16	+19	
1973/1974	First Class (Eerste klasse) A	2	22	12	6	4	30	50	29	+21	
1972/1973	First Class (Eerste klasse) B	1	22	16	4	2	36	49	12	+37	
1971/1972	First Class (Eerste klasse) B	1	20	13	3	4	29	43	22	+21	
1970/1971	First Class (Eerste klasse) A	2	18	9	6	4	24	34	22	+12	
