= 2023–24 Eredivisie =

68th season of the Eredivisie

Eredivisie
- Season: 2023–24
- Dates: 11 August 2023 – 19 May 2024
- Champions: PSV Eindhoven (25th title)
- Relegated: Excelsior; Volendam; Vitesse
- Champions League: PSV Eindhoven; Feyenoord; Twente
- Europa League: AZ; Ajax
- Conference League: Go Ahead Eagles
- Matches: 306
- Goals: 992 (3.24 per match)
- Top goalscorer: Luuk de Jong; Vangelis Pavlidis (29 goals each)
- Biggest home win: Feyenoord 6–0 Ajax (7 April 2024); PSV Eindhoven 6–0 Vitesse (13 April 2024)
- Biggest away win: Heerenveen 0–8 PSV Eindhoven (25 April 2024)
- Highest scoring: Twente 7–2 Volendam (12 May 2024)
- Longest winning run: 17 matches PSV Eindhoven
- Longest unbeaten run: 26 matches PSV Eindhoven
- Longest winless run: 12 matches Almere City; Volendam
- Longest losing run: 6 matches Excelsior

The 2023–24 Eredivisie was the 68th season of Eredivisie, the premier football competition in the Netherlands. It began on 11 August 2023 and concluded on 19 May 2024. PSV Eindhoven broke the record for most points in an Eredivisie season, with 91, overtaking Ajax's 89-point season in 1997–98.

Since Netherlands ascended from seventh to sixth place in the UEFA association coefficient rankings at the end of the 2022–23 season, the three best-ranked teams could now qualify for the UEFA Champions League (the champions and runners-up entered directly into the league stage, and the third-placed team entered the third qualifying round). The KNVB Cup winner qualified for UEFA Europa League groups while the fourth-placed team qualified for UEFA Europa League second qualifying round and fifth through eighth-placed teams qualified to the European competition play-offs.

PSV became the champions in round 32, beating Sparta Rotterdam 4–2 at their own Philips Stadion in Eindhoven on 5 May 2024.

== Teams ==
Heracles Almelo, PEC Zwolle (both promoted after a one-year absence), and Almere City (promoted for the first time in their history to Eredivisie) were promoted from the 2022–23 Eerste Divisie. After 23 years in the Eredivisie, Groningen were relegated to the Eerste Divisie, alongside Cambuur after two years, and Emmen after one year.

Locations of the 2023–24 Eredivisie teams
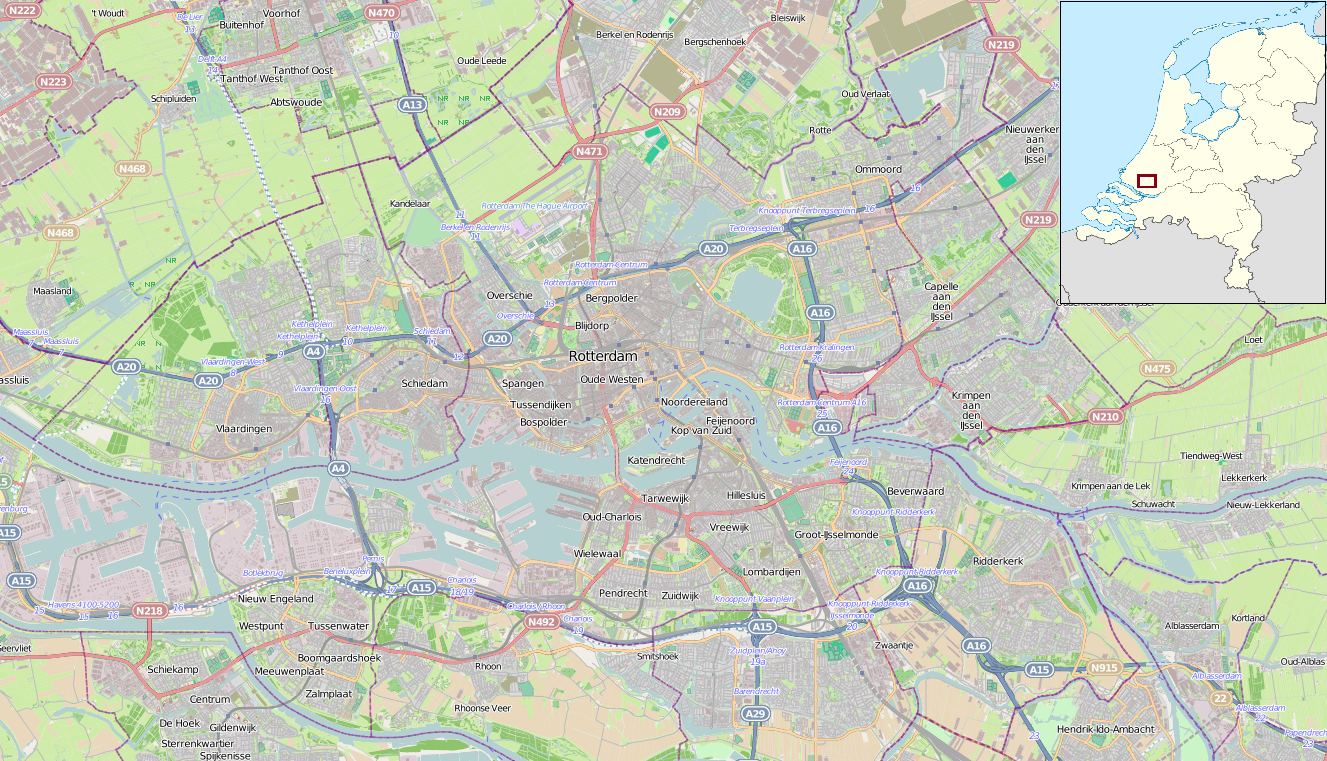
Rotterdam Eredivisie football clubs

=== Stadiums and locations ===
Club	Location	Venue	Capacity	2022–23 position
Ajax	Amsterdam	Johan Cruyff Arena	55,865	3rd
Almere City	Almere	Yanmar Stadion	4,501	1D, 3rd (Play-off winner)
AZ	Alkmaar	AFAS Stadion	19,478	4th
Excelsior	Rotterdam (Kralingen-Crooswijk)	Van Donge & De Roo Stadion	4,500	15th
Feyenoord	Rotterdam (Feijenoord)	De Kuip	47,500	1st
Fortuna Sittard	Sittard	Fortuna Sittard Stadion	10,300	13th
Go Ahead Eagles	Deventer	De Adelaarshorst	10,000	11th
Heerenveen	Heerenveen	Abe Lenstra Stadion	27,224	8th
Heracles Almelo	Almelo	Erve Asito	12,080	1D, 1st
NEC	Nijmegen	Goffertstadion	12,500	12th
PEC Zwolle	Zwolle	MAC³PARK Stadion	13,250	1D, 2nd
PSV Eindhoven	Eindhoven	Philips Stadion	36,500	2nd
RKC Waalwijk	Waalwijk	Mandemakers Stadion	7,500	9th
Sparta Rotterdam	Rotterdam (Delfshaven)	Spartastadion Het Kasteel	11,000	6th
Twente	Enschede	De Grolsch Veste	30,205	5th
Utrecht	Utrecht	Stadion Galgenwaard	23,750	7th
Vitesse	Arnhem	GelreDome	21,248	10th
Volendam	Volendam	Kras Stadion	7,384	14th

=== Number of teams by province ===
Number of teams	Province	Team(s)
4	Overijssel	Go Ahead Eagles, Heracles Almelo, PEC Zwolle, Twente
3	North Holland	Ajax, AZ, Volendam
3	South Holland	Excelsior, Feyenoord, Sparta Rotterdam
2	North Brabant	PSV Eindhoven, RKC Waalwijk
2	Gelderland	NEC, Vitesse
1	Flevoland	Almere City
1	Friesland	Heerenveen
1	Limburg	Fortuna Sittard
1	Utrecht	Utrecht

=== Personnel and kits ===
Note: Flags indicate national team as has been defined under FIFA eligibility rules. Players and managers may hold more than one non-FIFA nationality.

Team	President	Manager	Captain	Kit manufacturer	Shirt sponsors (front)	Shirt sponsors (back)	Shirt sponsors (sleeves)	Shorts sponsors
Ajax	(Netherlands) Jan van Halst (int.)	(Netherlands) John van 't Schip	(Netherlands) Steven Bergwijn	Adidas	Ziggo	Ziggo Sport	Curaçao	None
Almere City	(Netherlands) John Bes	(Netherlands) Alex Pastoor	(Curaçao) Sherel Floranus	Craft	OneCasino, Promo LED Systems	Kroonenberg Group, MASCOT Workwear	eFulfilment Europe	None
AZ	(Netherlands) Robert Eenhoorn	(Belgium) Maarten Martens	(Netherlands) Bruno Martins Indi	Nike	Kansino	Elfi Vastgoed	Cavallaro Napoli	None
Excelsior	(Netherlands) Bob de Lange	(Netherlands) Marinus Dijkhuizen	(Netherlands) Stijn van Gassel	Quick	DSW Zorgverzekeraar	CARU Containers, DSW Zorgverzekeraar	CARU Containers	CARU Containers
Feyenoord	(Netherlands) Dennis te Kloese	(Netherlands) Arne Slot	(Austria) Gernot Trauner	Castore	EuroParcs	Prijsvrij	TOTO Nederlandse Loterij	None
Fortuna Sittard	(Turkey) Işıtan Gün	(Netherlands) Danny Buijs	(Portugal) Ivo Pinto	Robey	BetCity	Winkelhart sittard	None	None
Go Ahead Eagles	(Netherlands) Jan Willem van Dop	(Netherlands) René Hake	(Netherlands) Bas Kuipers	Stanno	Betnation, Vierhouten Group	Validsign, DGS Processing Solutions	Looox, Contrall	Vierhouten Group, Loodgietersbedrijf M.Kramer
Heerenveen	(Netherlands) Ferry de Haan	(Netherlands) Kees van Wonderen	(Netherlands) Sven van Beek	Macron	Ausnutria	MASCOT Workwear, Effektief	TOTO Nederlandse Loterij	Veolia
Heracles Almelo	(Netherlands) Bart Haverland	(Netherlands) Erwin van de Looi	(Netherlands) Justin Hoogma	Acerbis	Asito	Asito	Kans voor een Kind	Asito
NEC	(Netherlands) Ron van Oijen	(Netherlands) Rogier Meijer	(Denmark) Lasse Schöne	Robey	KlokGroep	NasWerkt	None	GX Software
PEC Zwolle	(Netherlands) Erik van der Ham	(Netherlands) Johnny Jansen	(Netherlands) Bram van Polen	Adidas	Circus.nl Sport & Casino	Molecaten	VDK Groep	Quades
PSV Eindhoven	(Netherlands) Marcel Brands	(Netherlands) Peter Bosz	(Netherlands) Luuk de Jong	Puma	Metropoolregio Brainport Eindhoven (Philips, one competition match)	GoodHabitz	TOTO Nederlandse Loterij	None
RKC Waalwijk	(Netherlands) Peter Konijnenburg	(Netherlands) Henk Fraser	(Netherlands) Michiel Kramer	Stanno	Willy Naessens, JM van Delft & zn	Mandemakers, Van Mossel	TOTO Nederlandse Loterij	DAS Bouwsystemen
Sparta Rotterdam	(Netherlands) Leo Ruijs	(Netherlands) Jeroen Rijsdijk	(Netherlands) Bart Vriends	Robey	De Goudse Verzekeringen, D&S Group	Blue10, VNOM	TOTO Nederlandse Loterij, BICT Groep	Toll Global Forwarding, Trofi Pack
Twente	(Netherlands) Paul van der Kraan	(Netherlands) Joseph Oosting	(Netherlands) Robin Pröpper	Castore	Elektramat	ThermoSolutions BV	TOTO Nederlandse Loterij, Taurus Corporate Finance	Elektramat
Utrecht	(Netherlands) Thijs van Es	(Netherlands) Ron Jans	(Netherlands) Nick Viergever	Castore	T-Mobile (until 5 September 2023)/Odido (from 5 September 2023)	None	U4U	Dassy
Vitesse	(Netherlands) Henk Parren	(Netherlands) Edward Sturing	(Netherlands) Marco van Ginkel	Robey	BetCity	50+ mobiel	Burgers' Zoo, Clean Mat Trucks	SMB Willems
Volendam	vacant	(Netherlands) Regillio Simons	(Netherlands) Xavier Mbuyamba	Robey	BetCity, Metafa Holland	Keukenloods, Timbo Afrika	Podobrace	Bevela, Dakluik van Gorter

=== Managerial changes ===
Team	Outgoing manager	Manner of departure	Date of vacancy	Position in table	Replaced by	Date of appointment
Ajax	(Netherlands) John Heitinga	End of interim spell	30 June 2023	Pre-season	(Netherlands) Maurice Steijn	1 July 2023
Fortuna Sittard	(Spain) Julio Velázquez	End of contract	30 June 2023	Pre-season	(Netherlands) Danny Buijs	1 July 2023
PSV Eindhoven	(Netherlands) Fred Rutten	End of interim spell	30 June 2023	Pre-season	(Netherlands) Peter Bosz	1 July 2023
RKC Waalwijk	(Netherlands) Joseph Oosting	Signed by Twente	30 June 2023	Pre-season	(Netherlands) Henk Fraser	1 July 2023
Sparta Rotterdam	(Netherlands) Maurice Steijn	Signed by Ajax	30 June 2023	Pre-season	(Netherlands) Jeroen Rijsdijk	3 July 2023
Twente	(Netherlands) Ron Jans	End of contract	30 June 2023	Pre-season	(Netherlands) Joseph Oosting	1 July 2023
Volendam	(Netherlands) Wim Jonk	Moved into the role of technical manager	30 June 2023	Pre-season	(Germany) Matthias Kohler	1 July 2023
PEC Zwolle	(Netherlands) Dick Schreuder	Signed by Castellón	30 June 2023	Pre-season	(Netherlands) Johnny Jansen	1 July 2023
Utrecht	(Denmark) Michael Silberbauer	Sacked	29 August 2023	16th	(Netherlands) Rob Penders (a.i.)	29 August 2023
Utrecht	(Netherlands) Rob Penders (a.i.)	End of interim spell	11 September 2023	16th	(Netherlands) Ron Jans	11 September 2023
Ajax	(Netherlands) Maurice Steijn	Sacked	23 October 2023	17th	(Netherlands) Hedwiges Maduro (a.i.)	23 October 2023
Ajax	(Netherlands) Hedwiges Maduro (a.i.)	End of interim spell	30 October 2023	18th	(Netherlands) John van 't Schip	30 October 2023
Vitesse	(Netherlands) Phillip Cocu	Resigned	11 November 2023	18th	(Netherlands) Edward Sturing	20 November 2023
Volendam	(Germany) Matthias Kohler	Resigned	3 December 2023	17th	(Netherlands) Michael Dingsdag (a.i.)	5 December 2023
Heracles Almelo	(Netherlands) John Lammers	Sacked	12 December 2023	14th	(Netherlands) Hendrie Krüzen (a.i.)	12 December 2023
Heracles Almelo	(Netherlands) Hendrie Krüzen (a.i.)	End of interim spell	21 December 2023	15th	(Netherlands) Erwin van de Looi	21 December 2023
Volendam	(Netherlands) Michael Dingsdag (a.i.)	End of interim spell	21 December 2023	17th	(Netherlands) Regillio Simons	21 December 2023
AZ Alkmaar	(Netherlands) Pascal Jansen	Sacked	17 January 2024	4th	(Belgium) Maarten Martens	17 January 2024

== Standings ==
=== League table ===
Pos	Team	Pld	W	D	L	GF	GA	GD	Pts	Qualification or relegation
1	PSV Eindhoven (C)	34	29	4	1	111	21	+90	91	Qualification for the Champions League league stage
2	Feyenoord	34	26	6	2	92	26	+66	84	Qualification for the Champions League league stage
3	Twente	34	21	6	7	69	36	+33	69	Qualification for the Champions League third qualifying round
4	AZ	34	19	8	7	70	39	+31	65	Qualification for the Europa League league stage (Note: The 2023–24 KNVB Cup winners qualified for the Europa League league stage. Since the cup winners (Feyenoord) qualified based on league position, the Europa League spot was passed to the fourth-placed team.)
5	Ajax	34	15	11	8	74	61	+13	56	Qualification for the Europa League second qualifying round
6	NEC	34	14	11	9	68	51	+17	53	Qualification for the European competition play-offs
7	Utrecht	34	13	11	10	49	47	+2	50	Qualification for the European competition play-offs
8	Sparta Rotterdam	34	14	7	13	51	48	+3	49	Qualification for the European competition play-offs
9	Go Ahead Eagles (O)	34	12	10	12	47	46	+1	46	Qualification for the European competition play-offs
10	Fortuna Sittard	34	9	11	14	37	56	−19	38	
11	Heerenveen	34	10	7	17	53	70	−17	37	
12	PEC Zwolle	34	9	9	16	45	67	−22	36	
13	Almere City	34	7	13	14	33	59	−26	34	
14	Heracles Almelo	34	9	6	19	41	74	−33	33	
15	RKC Waalwijk	34	7	8	19	38	56	−18	29	
16	Excelsior (R)	34	6	11	17	50	73	−23	29	Qualification for the Relegation play-off
17	Volendam (R)	34	4	7	23	34	88	−54	19	Relegation to Eerste Divisie
18	Vitesse (Note: Vitesse were deducted eighteen points for breaking the license requirements set by the Royal Dutch Football Association.) (R)	34	6	6	22	30	74	−44	6	Relegation to Eerste Divisie

Source: Eredivisie
Rules for classification: Season in progress: 1) Most points won; 2) Less points lost; 3) Goal difference; 4) Goals scored; 5) Alphabetical order; End of season: 1) Points; 2) Goal difference; 3) Goals scored; 4) Head-to-head points; 5) Head-to-head goal difference; 6) Head-to-head away goals scored; 7) Play-off if relevant for deciding champion, relegation or participating in a European league, otherwise by draw. 8) Penalty shoot-out (only after a play-off)
(C) Champions; (O) Play-off winners; (R) Relegated

== Results ==
Home \ Away	AJA	ALM	AZ	EXC	FEY	FOR	GAE	HEE	HER	NEC	PEC	PSV	RKC	SPA	TWE	UTR	VIT	VOL
Ajax		3–0	1–2	2–2	0–4	2–2	1–1	4–1	4–1	2–2	2–2	1–1	4–1	2–1	2–1	2–0	5–0	2–0
Almere City	2–2		0–0	2–1	0–2	0–0	0–0	1–1	0–5	1–4	1–2	0–4	1–0	2–3	1–4	1–1	5–0	1–1
AZ	2–0	4–1		4–0	0–1	4–0	5–1	3–0	1–1	1–2	2–2	0–4	3–2	2–0	2–1	3–3	2–0	3–0
Excelsior	2–2	0–0	1–1		2–4	2–2	1–1	3–0	4–0	0–3	2–4	0–2	1–1	2–1	0–3	1–1	1–2	4–0
Feyenoord	6–0	6–1	1–0	4–0		0–0	3–1	6–1	3–0	2–2	5–0	1–2	1–0	2–0	0–0	4–2	4–0	3–1
Fortuna Sittard	0–0	2–1	1–2	5–2	0–1		0–0	3–3	4–1	1–1	3–1	1–1	1–0	0–2	0–3	0–0	3–1	3–1
Go Ahead Eagles	2–3	1–1	0–3	3–0	1–3	3–0		3–2	4–0	2–2	1–1	0–1	1–0	0–0	1–3	0–2	5–1	4–1
Heerenveen	3–2	3–0	2–2	0–3	2–3	3–0	0–2		3–0	1–1	2–0	0–8	3–1	1–3	3–3	2–3	1–3	1–2
Heracles Almelo	2–4	2–2	5–0	3–1	0–4	0–0	2–0	0–2		2–1	2–1	0–6	0–5	0–1	2–2	1–3	3–2	1–1
NEC	1–2	1–1	0–3	3–4	2–3	4–1	1–1	2–0	3–1		2–2	3–1	3–0	2–0	1–0	3–0	1–3	3–3
PEC Zwolle	1–3	0–1	0–3	2–1	0–2	2–0	1–1	2–2	3–1	1–3		1–7	1–2	1–2	1–2	1–0	1–0	1–1
PSV Eindhoven	5–2	2–0	5–1	3–1	2–2	3–1	3–0	2–0	2–0	4–0	4–0		3–1	4–2	1–0	2–0	6–0	3–1
RKC Waalwijk	2–3	0–0	1–3	2–2	1–2	0–1	0–1	1–1	1–2	2–0	1–1	0–4		1–1	1–0	2–2	3–1	2–1
Sparta Rotterdam	2–2	1–2	1–1	4–2	2–2	4–0	0–2	2–1	1–2	1–1	0–2	0–4	2–0		2–2	1–2	1–0	1–0
Twente	3–1	3–1	2–1	4–2	2–1	2–0	3–0	1–0	1–0	3–3	3–1	0–3	3–0	2–1		0–1	1–0	7–2
Utrecht	4–3	0–2	1–1	2–2	1–5	4–0	2–1	0–2	1–0	1–0	5–1	1–1	1–1	0–1	1–1		1–0	4–2
Vitesse	2–2	1–1	0–2	0–0	1–2	3–2	0–2	1–3	2–0	0–3	1–1	1–3	0–2	1–4	1–2	0–0		1–1
Volendam	1–4	0–1	0–4	3–1	0–0	0–1	1–2	0–4	2–2	2–5	0–5	1–5	3–2	1–4	0–2	1–0	1–2	

Source: Flashscore
Legend: Blue = home team win; Yellow = draw; Red = away team win.
For upcoming matches, an "a" indicates there is an article about the rivalry between the two participants.

== Play-offs ==
All times Central European Summer Time (UTC+2)

=== European competition play-offs ===
==== Bracket ====
Semi-finals
7	Utrecht	3
8	Sparta Rotterdam	1
6	NEC	1
9	Go Ahead Eagles	2

Final
7	Utrecht	1
9	Go Ahead Eagles (a.e.t.)	2

==== Semi-finals ====
23 May 2024
18:45

NEC	1–2	Go Ahead Eagles
Sano 57'	Report	Stokkers 77'; Rommens 86'

De Goffert, Nijmegen
Attendance: 12,036
Referee: Bas Nijhuis
23 May 2024
21:00

Utrecht	3–1	Sparta Rotterdam
Flamingo 41'; Lammers 70'; Jensen 90+3'	Report	Lauritsen 38'

Stadion Galgenwaard, Utrecht
Attendance: 20,092
Referee: Danny Makkelie

==== Final ====
26 May 2024
18:00

Utrecht	1–2 (a.e.t.)	Go Ahead Eagles
Viergever 31'	Report	Viergever 90+1' (o.g.); Kramer 117'

Stadion Galgenwaard, Utrecht
Attendance: 22,574
Referee: Allard Lindhout

=== Promotion/relegation play-offs ===
==== Bracket ====
First round
ADO Den Haag	3	2	5
De Graafschap	2	2	4
Dordrecht	2	0	2
Emmen	2	1	3
Roda JC Kerkrade	1	0	1
NAC Breda	3	5	8

Semi-finals
Excelsior	2	7	9
ADO Den Haag	1	1	2
Emmen	1	0	1
NAC Breda	1	3	4

Final
Excelsior	2	4	6
NAC Breda	6	1	7

==== First round ====
13 May 2024
20:00

NAC Breda	3–1	Roda JC Kerkrade
Haugen 16'; Janošek 56' (pen.), 58'	Report	Koglin 87'

Rat Verlegh Stadion, Breda
Attendance: 17,153
Referee: Ingmar Oostrom
17 May 2024
20:00

Roda JC Kerkrade	0–5	NAC Breda
	Report	Kemper 44'; Janošek 49'; Kuijpers 59'; Koscelník 75'; Haugen 79'

Parkstad Limburg Stadion, Kerkrade
Attendance: 11,523
Referee: Jannick van der Laan

NAC Breda won 8–1 on aggregate.

14 May 2024
18:45

Emmen	2–2	Dordrecht
Parzyszek 11'; Besuijen 38'	Report	Suray 26'; Bronkhorst 50'

De Oude Meerdijk, Emmen
Attendance: 6,945
Referee: Sander van der Eijk
18 May 2024
16:30

Dordrecht	0–1	Emmen
	Report	Besuijen 88'

M-Scores Stadion, Dordrecht
Attendance: 3,980
Referee: Martin van den Kerkhof

Emmen won 3–2 on aggregate.

14 May 2024
21:00

De Graafschap	2–3	ADO Den Haag
Büttner 13'; Fortes 90+7' (pen.)	Report	Absalem 30'; Van Mieghem 58'; Schalk 66'

De Vijverberg, Doetinchem
Attendance: 10,083
Referee: Marc Nagtegaal
18 May 2024
20:00

ADO Den Haag	2–2	De Graafschap
Schalk 23', 36'	Report	Seuntjens 67'; Fortes 74'

Bingoal Stadium, The Hague
Attendance: 9,195
Referee: Alex Bos

ADO Den Haag won 5–4 on aggregate.

==== Semi-finals ====
21 May 2024
20:00

NAC Breda	1–1	Emmen
Haugen 38'	Report	Besuijen 82' (pen.)

Rat Verlegh Stadion, Breda
Attendance: 18,361
Referee: Marc Nagtegaal
25 May 2024
16:30

Emmen	0–3	NAC Breda
	Report	Haugen 12'; Van den Bergh 14'; Kuijpers 56'

De Oude Meerdijk, Emmen
Attendance: 8,309
Referee: Rob Dieperink

NAC Breda won 4–1 on aggregate.

22 May 2024
18:45

ADO Den Haag	1–2	Excelsior
Veerman 71'	Report	Driouech 16'; Duijvestijn 23'

Bingoal Stadium, The Hague
Attendance: 11,935
Referee: Sander van der Eijk
25 May 2024
20:00

Excelsior	7–1	ADO Den Haag
Parrott 3', 27', 31' (pen.); Driouech 40'; Baas 55' (pen.); Goudmijn 71'; Lamprou 72'	Report	Veerman 45+2'

Van Donge & De Roo Stadion, Rotterdam
Attendance: 4,400
Referee: Jeroen Manschot

Excelsior won 9–2 on aggregate.

==== Final ====
28 May 2024
20:00

NAC Breda	6–2	Excelsior
Omgba 12'; Janošek 39' (pen.); Van den Bergh 42'; Koscelník 74'; Ómarsson 78', 90+4'	Report	Duijvestijn 25'; Parrott 45+6' (pen.)

Rat Verlegh Stadion, Breda
Attendance: 19,000
Referee: Dennis Higler
2 June 2024
18:00

Excelsior	4–1	NAC Breda
Parrott 20', 35' (pen.), 50'; Kemper 42' (o.g.)	Report	Staring 58'

Van Donge & De Roo Stadion, Rotterdam
Attendance: 4,500
Referee: Danny Makkelie

NAC Breda won 7–6 on aggregate.

== Statistics ==
=== Top scorers ===
Rank	Player	Club	Goals
1	(Netherlands) Luuk de Jong	PSV Eindhoven	29
1	(Greece) Vangelis Pavlidis	AZ	29
3	(Mexico) Santiago Giménez	Feyenoord	23
4	(Netherlands) Brian Brobbey	Ajax	18
5	(Netherlands) Sem Steijn	Twente	17
6	(Netherlands) Ricky van Wolfswinkel	Twente	16
7	(Germany) Lennart Thy	PEC Zwolle	13
8	(Belgium) Johan Bakayoko	PSV Eindhoven	12
8	(Netherlands) Steven Bergwijn	Ajax	12
8	(Norway) Tobias Lauritsen	Sparta Rotterdam	12
8	(Netherlands) Kaj Sierhuis	Fortuna Sittard	12

=== Hat-tricks ===
Rnd	Player	Club	Goals	Date	Home	Score	Away
6	(Mexico) Santiago Giménez	Feyenoord	9', 18', 59'	27 September 2023	Ajax	0–4	Feyenoord
9	(Greece) Vangelis Pavlidis	AZ	11', 59', 76'	21 October 2023	AZ	3–0	Heerenveen
10	(Mexico) Hirving Lozano	PSV Eindhoven	20', 60', 72'	29 October 2023	PSV Eindhoven	5–2	Ajax
13	(Mexico) Santiago Giménez	Feyenoord	6', 61', 82'	25 November 2023	Excelsior	2–4	Feyenoord
13	(Netherlands) Mohamed Sankoh	Heracles Almelo	4', 64', 87'	26 November 2023	Almere City	0–5	Heracles Almelo
14	(Netherlands) Ferdy Druijf	PEC Zwolle	62', 67', 87'	2 December 2023	Volendam	0–5	PEC Zwolle
17	(Netherlands) Luuk de Jong	PSV Eindhoven	13', 17', 69'	13 January 2024	PSV Eindhoven	3–1	Excelsior
20	(United States) Taylor Booth	Utrecht	38', 57', 84'	4 February 2024	Utrecht	4–2	Volendam
23	(Netherlands) Luuk de Jong	PSV Eindhoven	32', 51', 71'	24 February 2024	PEC Zwolle	1–7	PSV Eindhoven
24	(Netherlands) Kaj Sierhuis	Fortuna Sittard	15', 29', 34'	3 March 2024	Fortuna Sittard	5–2	Excelsior
32	(Netherlands) David Min	RKC Waalwijk	7', 67', 82'	5 May 2024	Heracles Almelo	0–5	RKC Waalwijk
33	(Netherlands) Steven Bergwijn	Ajax	29', 34', 38'	12 May 2024	Ajax	3–0	Almere City
33	(Netherlands) Sem Steijn	Twente	43', 69', 73'	12 May 2024	Twente	7–2	Volendam

== Awards ==
=== Monthly awards ===
Month	Player of the Month		Talent of the Month		Ref.	Team of the Month
Month	Player	Club	Player	Club	Ref.	Team of the Month
August	Vangelis Pavlidis	AZ	Jorrel Hato	Ajax		Pandur (Fortuna Sittard); Sugawara (AZ), Geertruida (Feyenoord), Hato (Ajax), Kuipers (Go Ahead Eagles); Wieffer (Feyenoord), Sadílek (Twente); Lauritsen (Sparta Rotterdam), Agrafiotis (Excelsior), Vertessen (PSV Eindhoven); Pavlidis (AZ)
September	Santiago Giménez	Feyenoord	Youri Regeer	Twente		De Lange (Go Ahead Eagles); Regeer (Twente), Hancko (Feyenoord), Bazoer (AZ), Sugawara (AZ); Veerman (PSV Eindhoven), Clasie (AZ); Lang (PSV Eindhoven), Giménez (Feyenoord), De Jong (PSV Eindhoven), Steijn (Twente)
October	Vangelis Pavlidis	AZ	Johan Bakayoko	PSV Eindhoven		De Lange (Go Ahead Eagles); Sugawara (AZ), Geertruida (Feyenoord), Benamar (Volendam), Regeer (Twente); Brouwers (SC Heerenveen), Veerman (PSV Eindhoven); Bakayoko (PSV Eindhoven), Giménez (Feyenoord), Ugalde (Twente); Pavlidis (AZ)
November	Joey Veerman	PSV Eindhoven	Johan Bakayoko	PSV Eindhoven		De Lange (Go Ahead Eagles); Teze (PSV Eindhoven), Vriends (Sparta Rotterdam), Ramalho (PSV Eindhoven), Dest (PSV Eindhoven); Timber (Feyenoord), Veerman (PSV Eindhoven); Bakayoko (PSV Eindhoven), Willumsson (Go Ahead Eagles), Bergwijn (Ajax); Ogawa (NEC)
December	Brian Brobbey	Ajax	Benjamin Tahirović	Ajax		Barkas (Utrecht); Geertruida (Feyenoord), Boscagli (PSV Eindhoven), Dest (PSV Eindhoven); Tahirović (Ajax), Oukili (RKC Waalwijk); Tavşan (NEC), Steijn (Twente), Druijf (PEC Zwolle); Brobbey (Ajax), Pavlidis (AZ)
January	Brian Brobbey	Ajax	Kristian Hlynsson	Ajax		Unnerstall (Twente); Geertruida (Feyenoord), Siovas (Fortuna Sittard), Nuytinck (NEC), Dest (PSV Eindhoven); Tahirović (Ajax), Berghuis (Ajax), Boussaid (Utrecht), Hlynsson (Ajax); Brobbey (Ajax), De Jong (PSV Eindhoven)
February	Luuk de Jong	PSV Eindhoven	Ruben van Bommel	AZ		Schendelaar (PEC Zwolle); Geertruida (Feyenoord), Pröpper (Twente), Hancko (Feyenoord), Dest (PSV Eindhoven); Wieffer (Feyenoord), Schouten (PSV Eindhoven), Proper (NEC), Van Bommel (AZ); De Jong (PSV Eindhoven), Van Amersfoort (SC Heerenveen)
March	Kaj Sierhuis	Fortuna Sittard	Wouter Goes	AZ		De Lange (Go Ahead Eagles); Sugawara (AZ), Goes (AZ), Bazoer (AZ), Köhlert (SC Heerenveen); Özyakup (Fortuna Sittard), Clement (Sparta Rotterdam); Mijnans (AZ), Verschueren (Sparta Rotterdam), Vlap (Twente); Sierhuis (Fortuna Sittard)
April	Sam Lammers	Utrecht	Johan Bakayoko	PSV Eindhoven		Backhaus (Volendam); Mauro Júnior (PSV Eindhoven), Hancko (Feyenoord), Boscagli (PSV Eindhoven), Teze (PSV Eindhoven); Tillman (PSV Eindhoven), Veerman (PSV Eindhoven), Kjølø (Twente), Bakayoko (PSV Eindhoven); Lammers (Utrecht), De Jong (PSV Eindhoven)
May	Tjaronn Chery	NEC	Kacper Kozłowski	Vitesse		Vaessen (RKC Waalwijk); Zagré (Excelsior), Hancko (Feyenoord), Trauner (Feyenoord), Geertruida (Feyenoord); Steijn (Twente), Schouten (PSV Eindhoven), Chery (NEC); Bergwijn (Ajax), Pavlidis (AZ), Kozłowski (Vitesse)

=== Annual awards ===
Award	Player	Club	Ref.
Player of the Season	(Netherlands) Luuk de Jong	PSV Eindhoven	
Talent of the Season	(Belgium) Johan Bakayoko	PSV Eindhoven	
Goal of the Season	(Brazil) Igor Paixão	Feyenoord	

Team of the Season
Goalkeeper	(Argentina) Walter Benítez (PSV)			
Defenders	(Netherlands) Lutsharel Geertruida (Feyenoord)		(Slovakia) Dávid Hancko (Feyenoord)	(Netherlands) Jerdy Schouten (PSV)
Midfielders	(Netherlands) Joey Veerman (PSV)		(England) Jordan Henderson (Ajax)	(Belgium) Johan Bakayoko (PSV)
Forwards	(Argentina) Santiago Giménez (Feyenoord)	(Netherlands) Luuk de Jong (PSV)	(Netherlands) Steven Bergwijn (Ajax)	(Greece) Vangelis Pavlidis (AZ)

== Attendances ==
Ajax drew the highest average home attendance in the 2023-24 edition of the Eredivisie.

#	Football club	Home games	Average attendance
1	AFC Ajax	17	53,744
2	Feyenoord	17	46,794
3	PSV	17	34,217
4	FC Twente	17	29,685
5	sc Heerenveen	17	21,623
6	FC Utrecht	17	20,531
7	AZ	17	18,187
8	Vitesse	17	16,206
9	PEC Zwolle	17	13,774
10	NEC	17	12,482
11	Heracles Almelo	17	11,844
12	Fortuna Sittard	17	10,334
13	Sparta Rotterdam	17	10,168
14	Go Ahead Eagles	17	9,821
15	FC Volendam	17	6,712
16	RKC Waalwijk	17	6,476
17	Excelsior	17	4,385
18	Almere City	17	4,164
