= 2023–24 NAC Breda season =

NAC Breda
2023–24 season
- Manager: Peter Hyballa (until 13 September); Ton Lokhoff (caretaker, from 13 September); Jean-Paul van Gastel (from 25 September)
- Stadium: Rat Verlegh Stadion
- Eerste Divisie: 7th
- Promotion play-offs: Winners (Promoted)
- KNVB Cup: First round
- Top goalscorer: League: Dominik Janošek (11); All: Dominik Janošek (14)
- Average home league attendance: 17,557
- Biggest win: Roda JC 0–5 NAC Breda
Home colours	Away colours	Third colours

The 2023–24 season is NAC Breda's 112th season in existence and fifth consecutive in the Eerste Divisie. They also competed in the KNVB Cup.

== Players ==
=== First-team squad ===
As of 31 August 2023

Note: Flags indicate national team as defined under FIFA eligibility rules; some limited exceptions apply. Players may hold more than one non-FIFA nationality.

No.	Pos.	Nation	Player
1	GK	NED	Roy Kortsmit
2	DF	NED	Boyd Lucassen
4	DF	NED	Boy Kemper
5	DF	BEL	Jan Van den Bergh
6	MF	NED	Casper Staring
7	MF	NZL	Matthew Garbett
8	MF	NED	Clint Leemans
10	FW	ISL	Elías Már Ómarsson
11	MF	IDN	Sem Yvel
14	FW	PLE	Adam Kaied
15	DF	CUW	Cuco Martina
16	MF	NED	Javier Vet
18	MF	MAR	Sabir Agougil

No.	Pos.	Nation	Player
19	FW	NED	Tom Boere
22	FW	NED	Aimé Omgba
23	DF	NED	Rowan Besselink
27	FW	NED	Thomas Marijnissen
31	DF	SWE	Victor Wernersson
35	MF	NED	Boris van Schuppen
36	GK	NED	Pepijn van de Merbel
37	GK	NED	Aron van Lare
39	MF	CZE	Dominik Janošek
49	GK	NED	Tein Troost
—	DF	SVK	Martin Koscelník
—	FW	NED	Roy Kuijpers
—	FW	NOR	Sigurd Hauso Haugen (on loan from AGF)

== Transfers ==
=== In ===
Pos.	Player	Transferred from	Fee	Date	Source

=== Out ===
Pos.	Player	Transferred to	Fee	Date	Source

== Pre-season and friendlies ==
Win Draw Loss Fixtures

25 July 2023 Friendly	NAC Breda (Netherlands)	3–2	(Greece) OFI Crete
15:00 CEST (UTC+2)

28 July 2023 Friendly	NAC Breda (Netherlands)	1–2	(South Africa) Mamelodi Sundowns
15:30 CEST (UTC+2)

4 August 2023 Friendly	NAC Breda (Netherlands)	1–1	(Turkey) Alanyaspor
19:30 CEST (UTC+2)

== Competitions ==
=== Overall record ===
Competition	First match	Last match	Starting round	Final position	Record							
Competition	First match	Last match	Starting round	Final position	Pld	W	D	L	GF	GA	GD	Win %
Eerste Divisie	11 August 2023	10 May 2024	Matchday 1	7th	38	15	11	12	61	54	+7	39.47
Promotion play-offs	13 May 2024	2 June 2024	First round		4	3	1	0	12	2	+10	75.00
KNVB Cup	31 October 2023		First round	First round	1	0	0	1	0	1	−1	0.00
Total					43	18	12	13	73	57	+16	41.86

Source: Soccerway

=== Eerste Divisie ===
==== League table ====
Pos	Team	Pld	W	D	L	GF	GA	GD	Pts	Promotion or qualification
6	De Graafschap	38	19	6	13	61	52	+9	63	Qualification for promotion play-offs
7	Emmen	38	17	6	15	59	60	−1	57	Qualification for promotion play-offs
8	NAC Breda (O, P)	38	15	11	12	63	56	+7	56	Qualification for promotion play-offs
9	MVV Maastricht	38	16	8	14	64	60	+4	56	
10	Jong AZ	38	16	8	14	62	61	+1	56	Reserve teams are not eligible to be promoted to the Eredivisie

Source: Flashscore, Keuken Kampioen Divisie (in Dutch)
Rules for classification: Season in progress: 1) Most points won; 2) Less points lost; 3) Goal difference; 4) Goals scored; 5) Alphabetical order; End of season: 1) Points; 2) Goal difference; 3) Goals scored; 4) Head-to-head points; 5) Head-to-head goal difference; 6) Head-to-head away goals scored; 7) Play-off if relevant for deciding champion, relegation or participating in a European league, otherwise by draw. 8) Penalty shoot-out (only after a play-off)
(O) Play-off winners; (P) Promoted

==== Results summary ====
Overall								Home						Away					
Pld	W	D	L	GF	GA	GD	Pts	W	D	L	GF	GA	GD	W	D	L	GF	GA	GD
38	15	11	12	63	56	+7	56	8	5	6	29	27	+2	7	6	6	34	29	+5

==== Results by round ====
Round	1	2	3	4	5	6	7	8	9	10	11	12	13	14	15	16	17	18	19	20	21	22	23	24	25	26	27	28	29	30	31	32	33	34	35	36	37	38
Ground	A	H	A	A	H	A	H	A	H	A	H	H	A	H	A	H	A	H	A	H	A	H	A	H	H	A	A	H	A	H	A	H	A	H	A	H	H	A
Result	D	W	L	W	L	L	L	D	W	W	W	D	L	D	W	W	W	W	L	L	W	L	L	D	D	D	W	W	W	W	L	L	D	L	D	W	D	D
Position	7	4	12	7	13	14	15	16	14	11	10	10	12	12	9	7	7	6	7	9	8	8	8	10	10	9	7	7	7	7	7	7	7	7	8	7	7	7

A = Away; H = Home; W = Win; D = Draw; L = Loss

==== Matches ====
The league fixtures were unveiled on 30 June 2023.

11 August 2023 1	Dordrecht	2–2	NAC Breda	Dordrecht
20:00 CEST (UTC+2)	Hilton 44'; Tsoungui 70'	Report	Janošek 75' (pen.); Sejdiu 90+5'	Stadium: Stadion Krommedijk; Attendance: 2,263; Referee: Laurens Gerrets

18 August 2023 2	NAC Breda	2–1	Jong AZ	Breda
20:00 CEST (UTC+2)	Janošek 41' (pen.), 43'	Report	Addai 75' (pen.)	Stadium: Rat Verlegh Stadion; Attendance: 17,034; Referee: Nick Smit

25 August 2023 3	Eindhoven	2–0	NAC Breda	Eindhoven
20:00 CEST (UTC+2)	Rottier 23'; Priske 90+1'	Report		Stadium: Jan Louwers Stadion; Attendance: 2,958; Referee: Rob Dieperink

5 September 2023 4	Willem II	1–4	NAC Breda	Tilburg
10:30 CEST (UTC+2)	Oosting 64'	Report	Sejdiu 4', 74'; Haugen 29'; Van den Bergh 49'	Stadium: Koning Willem II Stadion; Attendance: 13,836; Referee: Edwin van de Graaf

9 September 2023 5	NAC Breda	1–3	Roda JC Kerkrade	Breda
21:00 CEST (UTC+2)	Kuijpers 31'	Report	Peña Zauner 4'; Schmid 16'; Van der Heide 90+4'	Stadium: Rat Verlegh Stadion; Referee: Ingmar Oostrom

15 September 2023 6	VVV-Venlo	3–1	NAC Breda	Venlo
20:00 CEST (UTC+2)	Smans 4', 8'; Kaastrup 36'	Report	Janošek 14'	Stadium: De Koel; Referee: Richard Martens

22 September 2023 7	NAC Breda	1–3	Emmen	Breda
20:00 CEST (UTC+2)	Hardeveld 3' (o.g.)	Report	Vlak 14'; Dirksen (yellow card) 34'; Vos (yellow card) 54'; Heylen (yellow card) 55'; Konings 58'; Mendes 80'	Stadium: Rat Verlegh Stadion; Referee: Danny Makkelie

29 March 2024 32	NAC Breda	1–2	MVV Maastricht	Breda
20:00				Stadium: Rat Verlegh Stadion

12 April 2024 34	NAC Breda	1–4	Dordrecht	Breda
20:00				Stadium: Rat Verlegh Stadion

28 April 2024 36	NAC Breda	2–0	Jong PSV	Breda
16:45				Stadium: Rat Verlegh Stadion

3 May 2024 37	NAC Breda	2–2	ADO Den Haag	Breda
20:00				Stadium: Rat Verlegh Stadion

==== Promotion play-offs ====
13 May 2024 First round First leg	NAC Breda	3–1	Roda JC	Breda
20:00	Haugen 16'; Janošek 55' (pen.), 58'	Report	Koglin 87'	Stadium: Rat Verlegh Stadion; Attendance: 17,153; Referee: Inmar Oostrom

17 May 2024 First round Second leg	Roda JC	0–5 (1–8 agg.)	NAC Breda	Kerkrade
20:00		Report	Kemper 44'; Janošek 49'; Kuijpers 59'; Koscelník 75'; Haugen 78'	Stadium: Parkstad Limburg Stadion; Referee: Jannick van der Laan

21 May 2024 Semi-finals; First leg	NAC Breda	1–1	FC Emmen	Breda
20:00				Stadium: Rat Verlegh Stadion; Referee: Marc Nagtegaal

25 May 2024 Semi-finals; Second leg	FC Emmen	0–3 (1–4 agg.)	NAC Breda	Emmen
16:30				Stadium: De Oude Meerdijk; Referee: Rob Dieperink

28 May 2024 Final; First leg	NAC Breda	6–2	Excelsior	Breda
20:00	Omgba 12'; Lucassen (yellow card) 17'; Janošek 39' (pen.); Van den Bergh 42'; Van de Merbel (yellow card) 45+4'; Staring (yellow card) 52'; Koscelník 74'; Már Ómarsson 78', 90+4'		Zagré (yellow card) 15' (yellow-red card) 72'; Duijvestijn 25', (red card) 38'; Parrott 45+6' (pen.)	Stadium: Rat Verlegh Stadion; Referee: Dannis Higler

2 June 2024 Final; Second leg	Excelsior	4–1 (6–7 agg.)	NAC Breda	Rotterdam
18:00	Parrott 20', 35' (pen.), 50'; Kemper 42' (o.g.)	Report	Staring 58'	Stadium: Van Donge & De Roo Stadion; Attendance: 4,500; Referee: Danny Makkelie

=== KNVB Cup ===
31 October 2023 First round	Quick Boys	1–0	NAC Breda	Katwijk
20:00	Broekhuizen 25'	Report		Stadium: Sportpark Nieuw Zuid; Referee: Edwin van de Graaf
