= 2023–24 Eerste Divisie =

Eerste Divisie
- Season: 2023–24
- Dates: 11 August 2023 – 10 May 2024
- Champions: Willem II
- Promoted: Willem II; Groningen; NAC Breda
- Matches: 380
- Goals: 1,149 (3.02 per match)
- Top goalscorer: Henk Veerman (23 goals)
- Biggest home win: ADO Den Haag 6–0 Jong FC Utrecht (27 November 2023)
- Biggest away win: TOP Oss 1–8 Cambuur (6 November 2023)
- Highest scoring: TOP Oss 1–8 Cambuur (6 November 2023)
- Longest winning run: 6 matches Willem II; Groningen
- Longest unbeaten run: 15 matches Groningen
- Longest winless run: 12 matches Jong FC Utrecht
- Longest losing run: 6 matches Emmen; Telstar; Jong FC Utrecht
- All statistics correct as of 10 May 2024.

The 2023–24 Eerste Divisie was the 68th season of the Eerste Divisie, the second tier of football in the Netherlands since its establishment in 1956.

== Teams ==
A total of 20 teams took part in the league: 17 teams from the 2022–23 Eerste Divisie and 3 teams relegated from the 2022–23 Eredivisie.

Location of teams in the Eerste Divisie 2023–24

=== Stadiums and locations ===
Club	Location	Venue	Capacity
ADO Den Haag	The Hague	Bingoal Stadion	15,000
Cambuur	Leeuwarden	Cambuurstadion	10,500
Den Bosch	's-Hertogenbosch	Stadion De Vliert	8,713
Dordrecht	Dordrecht	M-Scores Stadion	4,235
Eindhoven	Eindhoven	Jan Louwers Stadion	4,600
Emmen	Emmen	De Oude Meerdijk	8,600
De Graafschap	Doetinchem	Stadion De Vijverberg	12,600
Groningen	Groningen	Euroborg	22,550
Helmond Sport	Helmond	GS Staalwerken Stadion	4,100
Jong Ajax	Amsterdam	Sportpark De Toekomst	2,050
Jong AZ	Alkmaar	AFAS Trainingscomplex	200
Jong PSV	Eindhoven	PSV Campus De Herdgang	2,500
Jong FC Utrecht	Utrecht	Sportcomplex Zoudenbalch	550
MVV Maastricht	Maastricht	Stadion De Geusselt	10,000
NAC Breda	Breda	Rat Verlegh Stadion	19,000
Roda JC Kerkrade	Kerkrade	Parkstad Limburg Stadion	19,979
Telstar	Velsen	BUKO Stadion	3,060
TOP Oss	Oss	Frans Heesenstadion	4,560
VVV-Venlo	Venlo	Covebo Stadion - De Koel	8,000
Willem II	Tilburg	Koning Willem II Stadion	14,700

=== Number of teams by provinces ===
Number of teams	Province	Team(s)
7	North Brabant	Den Bosch, Eindhoven, Helmond Sport, Jong PSV, NAC Breda, TOP Oss, Willem II
3	Limburg	MVV Maastricht, Roda JC Kerkrade, VVV-Venlo
3	North Holland	Jong Ajax, Jong AZ, Telstar
2	South Holland	ADO Den Haag, Dordrecht
1	Drenthe	Emmen
1	Friesland	Cambuur
1	Gelderland	De Graafschap
1	Groningen	Groningen
1	Utrecht	Jong FC Utrecht

=== Personnel ===
Note: Flags indicate national team as has been defined under FIFA eligibility rules. Players and Managers may hold more than one non-FIFA nationality.

Team	Manager	Captain	Kit manufacturer	Shirt sponsor
ADO Den Haag	(Switzerland) Darije Kalezić	(Netherlands) Kürşad Sürmeli	Erreà	Hommerson Casino
Cambuur	(Netherlands) Henk de Jong	(Netherlands) Daniël van Kaam	Adidas	Bouwgroep Dijkstra Draisma
Den Bosch	(Netherlands) William van Overbeek (a.i.)	(Netherlands) Victor van den Bogert	Robey	D-Reizen
Dordrecht	(Italy) Michele Santoni	(Belgium) Mathis Suray	Capelli Sport	Keukenwarenhuis.nl
Eindhoven	(Netherlands) Willem Weijs	(Togo) Mawouna Amevor	Macron	VDL Groep
Emmen	(Netherlands) Alfons Arts (a.i.)	(Netherlands) Maikel Kieftenbeld	Hummel	EasyToys
De Graafschap	(Netherlands) Jan Vreman	(Cape Verde) Jeffry Fortes	Robey	Onverwachte Hoek
Groningen	(Netherlands) Dick Lukkien	(Curaçao) Leandro Bacuna	Robey	OG Clean Fuels
Helmond Sport	(Netherlands) Adrie Bogers (a.i.) and (Netherlands) Tim Bakens (a.i.)	(Netherlands) Wouter van der Steen	Saller	Vescom
Jong Ajax	(Netherlands) Dave Vos	(Netherlands) Gabriel Misehouy	Adidas	Ziggo
Jong AZ	(Netherlands) Lee-Roy Echteld	(Netherlands) Jorn Berkhout	Nike	CTS GROUP
Jong PSV	(Netherlands) Wil Boessen	(Netherlands) Jason van Duiven	Puma	Metropoolregio Brainport Eindhoven
Jong FC Utrecht	(Netherlands) Ivar van Dinteren	(Netherlands) Yannick Leliendal	Castore	Odido
MVV Maastricht	(Netherlands) Maurice Verberne	(Netherlands) Nicky Souren	Nike	OneCasino
NAC Breda	(Netherlands) Jean-Paul van Gastel	(Curaçao) Cuco Martina	Nike	OK tankstations
Roda JC Kerkrade	(Netherlands) Bas Sibum	(Netherlands) Rodney Kongolo	Kipsta	APS Groep
Telstar	(Netherlands) Anthony Correia (a.i.) and (Netherlands) Ulrich Landvreugd (a.i.)	(Netherlands) Mitch Apau	Robey	711
TOP Oss	(Netherlands) Ruud Brood	(Suriname) Calvin Mac-Intosh	Saller	Restaurant Quisine
VVV-Venlo	(Netherlands) Rick Kruys	(Netherlands) Rick Ketting	Craft	Seacon
Willem II	(Belgium) Peter Maes	(Netherlands) Freek Heerkens	Robey	AVEC

=== Managerial changes ===
Team	Outgoing manager	Manner of departure	Date of vacancy	Position in table	Replaced by	Date of appointment
ADO Den Haag	(Netherlands) Dick Advocaat	End of interim spell	30 June 2023	Pre-season	(Bosnia and Herzegovina) Darije Kalezić	1 July 2023
Emmen	(Netherlands) Dick Lukkien	End of contract	30 June 2023	Pre-season	(Netherlands) Fred Grim	1 July 2023
De Graafschap	(Netherlands) Adrie Poldervaart	Health issues	30 June 2023	Pre-season	(Netherlands) Jan Vreman	1 July 2023
Eindhoven	(Netherlands) Rob Penders	Signed by Utrecht	30 June 2023	Pre-season	(Netherlands) Willem Weijs	1 July 2023
Groningen	(Netherlands) Dennis van der Ree	End of contract	30 June 2023	Pre-season	(Netherlands) Dick Lukkien	1 July 2023
Jong AZ	(Belgium) Maarten Martens	End of contract	30 June 2023	Pre-season	(Netherlands) Jan Sierksma	1 July 2023
Jong FC Utrecht	(Bosnia and Herzegovina) Darije Kalezić	Mutual consent	30 June 2023	Pre-season	(Netherlands) Ivar van Dinteren	1 July 2023
Roda JC Kerkrade	(Netherlands) Edwin de Graaf	End of contract	30 June 2023	Pre-season	(Netherlands) Bas Sibum	1 July 2023
TOP Oss	(Netherlands) Klaas Wels	Mutual consent	30 June 2023	Pre-season	(Netherlands) Ruud Brood	1 July 2023
Jong PSV	(Morocco) Adil Ramzi	Signed by Wydad	23 July 2023	Pre-season	(Netherlands) Wil Boessen	4 August 2023
Willem II	(Netherlands) Reinier Robbemond	Sacked	5 September 2023	15th	(Netherlands) Peter van den Berg (a.i.)	5 September 2023
NAC Breda	(Germany) Peter Hyballa	Sacked	13 September 2023	10th	(Netherlands) Ton Lokhoff (a.i.)	13 September 2023
Willem II	(Netherlands) Peter van den Berg (a.i.)	End of interim spell	18 September 2023	7th	(Belgium) Peter Maes	18 September 2023
NAC Breda	(Netherlands) Ton Lokhoff (a.i.)	End of interim spell	25 September 2023	15th	(Netherlands) Jean-Paul van Gastel	25 September 2023
Cambuur	(Netherlands) Sjors Ultee	Sacked	9 October 2023	11th	(Netherlands) Henk de Jong	10 October 2023
Jong AZ	(Netherlands) Jan Sierksma	Moved to AZ	18 January 2024	12th	(Netherlands) Lee-Roy Echteld	20 January 2024
Telstar	(Netherlands) Mike Snoei	Sacked	5 February 2024	20th	(Netherlands) Anthony Correia (a.i.) and (Netherlands) Ulrich Landvreugd (a.i.)	6 February 2024
Helmond Sport	(Belgium) Bob Peeters	Sacked	8 April 2024	13th	(Netherlands) Adrie Bogers (a.i.) and (Netherlands) Tim Bakens (a.i.)	9 April 2024
Emmen	(Netherlands) Fred Grim	Sacked	9 April 2024	12th	(Netherlands) Alfons Arts (a.i.)	13 April 2024
Den Bosch	(Poland) Tomasz Kaczmarek	Sacked	11 April 2024	19th	(Netherlands) William van Overbeek (a.i.)	11 April 2024

== Standings ==
=== League table ===
Pos	Team	Pld	W	D	L	GF	GA	GD	Pts	Promotion or qualification
1	Willem II (Note: Winner of the Second Period (Rounds 10–19)) (C, P)	38	23	10	5	77	35	+42	79	Promotion to the Eredivisie
2	Groningen (Note: Winner of the Third and Fourth Period (Rounds 20–29 and 30–38)) (P)	38	22	9	7	71	30	+41	75	Promotion to the Eredivisie
3	Roda JC Kerkrade (Note: Winner of the First Period (Rounds 1–9))	38	21	12	5	69	34	+35	75	Qualification for promotion play-offs
4	Dordrecht	38	18	15	5	74	51	+23	69	Qualification for promotion play-offs
5	ADO Den Haag	38	17	12	9	72	50	+22	63	Qualification for promotion play-offs
6	De Graafschap	38	19	6	13	61	52	+9	63	Qualification for promotion play-offs
7	Emmen	38	17	6	15	59	60	−1	57	Qualification for promotion play-offs
8	NAC Breda (O, P)	38	15	11	12	63	56	+7	56	Qualification for promotion play-offs
9	MVV Maastricht	38	16	8	14	64	60	+4	56	
10	Jong AZ	38	16	8	14	62	61	+1	56	Reserve teams are not eligible to be promoted to the Eredivisie
11	Helmond Sport	38	14	9	15	52	55	−3	51	
12	VVV-Venlo	38	13	9	16	53	58	−5	48	
13	Cambuur	38	13	8	17	71	74	−3	47	
14	Eindhoven	38	9	16	13	45	57	−12	43	
15	Jong Ajax	38	10	10	18	54	69	−15	40	Reserve teams are not eligible to be promoted to the Eredivisie
16	Jong PSV	38	11	7	20	63	81	−18	40	Reserve teams are not eligible to be promoted to the Eredivisie
17	Telstar	38	9	8	21	47	68	−21	35	
18	TOP Oss	38	10	4	24	32	66	−34	34	
19	Den Bosch	38	8	9	21	38	68	−30	33	
20	Jong FC Utrecht	38	5	11	22	32	74	−42	26	Reserve teams are not eligible to be promoted to the Eredivisie

Source: Flashscore, Keuken Kampioen Divisie (in Dutch)
Rules for classification: Season in progress: 1) Most points won; 2) Less points lost; 3) Goal difference; 4) Goals scored; 5) Alphabetical order; End of season: 1) Points; 2) Goal difference; 3) Goals scored; 4) Head-to-head points; 5) Head-to-head goal difference; 6) Head-to-head away goals scored; 7) Play-off if relevant for deciding champion, relegation or participating in a European league, otherwise by draw. 8) Penalty shoot-out (only after a play-off)
(C) Champions; (O) Play-off winners; (P) Promoted

== Period tables ==
=== Period 1 ===
Pos	Team	Pld	W	D	L	GF	GA	GD	Pts	Qualification
1	Roda JC Kerkrade	9	7	1	1	22	5	+17	22	Qualification for promotion play-offs
2	Emmen	9	5	3	1	18	12	+6	18	
3	ADO Den Haag	9	5	3	1	14	8	+6	18	
4	Eindhoven	9	4	5	0	9	4	+5	17	
5	Willem II	9	5	2	2	14	10	+4	17	
6	Dordrecht	9	3	5	1	18	14	+4	14	
7	De Graafschap	9	4	2	3	11	11	0	14	
8	VVV-Venlo	9	4	2	3	14	15	−1	14	
9	Helmond Sport	9	4	1	4	16	12	+4	13	
10	Groningen	9	4	1	4	14	10	+4	13	
11	Cambuur	9	4	1	4	21	21	0	13	
12	Jong PSV	9	4	1	4	13	19	−6	13	Reserves teams cannot participate in the promotion play-offs
13	Jong AZ	9	3	2	4	12	14	−2	11	Reserves teams cannot participate in the promotion play-offs
14	NAC Breda	9	3	2	4	15	18	−3	11	
15	Jong FC Utrecht	9	3	2	4	10	17	−7	11	Reserves teams cannot participate in the promotion play-offs
16	MVV Maastricht	9	3	1	5	14	17	−3	10	
17	Den Bosch	9	3	0	6	11	15	−4	9	
18	Jong Ajax	9	1	2	6	16	24	−8	5	Reserves teams cannot participate in the promotion play-offs
19	TOP Oss	9	1	1	7	7	13	−6	4	
20	Telstar	9	1	1	7	8	18	−10	4	

Source: Keuken Kampioen Divisie (in Dutch)
Rules for classification: 1) points; 2) goal difference; 3) number of goals scored

=== Period 2 ===
Pos	Team	Pld	W	D	L	GF	GA	GD	Pts	Qualification
1	Willem II	10	8	1	1	25	7	+18	25	Qualification for promotion play-offs
2	NAC Breda	10	6	2	2	21	10	+11	20	
3	De Graafschap	10	6	1	3	15	12	+3	19	
4	Cambuur	10	5	3	2	24	15	+9	18	
5	Jong AZ	10	5	2	3	15	16	−1	17	Reserves teams cannot participate in the promotion play-offs
6	ADO Den Haag	10	4	4	2	22	14	+8	16	
7	Dordrecht	10	4	4	2	21	14	+7	16	
8	Groningen	10	4	4	2	16	9	+7	16	
9	Jong Ajax	10	4	4	2	15	14	+1	16	Reserves teams cannot participate in the promotion play-offs
10	Roda JC Kerkrade	10	4	4	2	9	8	+1	16	Period 1 winner
11	Emmen	10	4	2	4	11	13	−2	14	
12	MVV Maastricht	10	3	4	3	13	12	+1	13	
13	Eindhoven	10	3	3	4	18	18	0	12	
14	VVV-Venlo	10	3	3	4	16	16	0	12	
15	Helmond Sport	10	3	2	5	13	19	−6	11	
16	Telstar	10	3	1	6	10	17	−7	10	
17	Jong FC Utrecht	10	1	4	5	8	19	−11	7	Reserves teams cannot participate in the promotion play-offs
18	TOP Oss	10	2	1	7	5	18	−13	7	
19	Jong PSV	10	1	2	7	12	22	−10	5	Reserves teams cannot participate in the promotion play-offs
20	Den Bosch	10	0	3	7	8	24	−16	3	

Source: Keuken Kampioen Divisie (in Dutch)
Rules for classification: 1) points; 2) goal difference; 3) number of goals scored

=== Period 3 ===
Pos	Team	Pld	W	D	L	GF	GA	GD	Pts	Qualification
1	Groningen	10	8	1	1	23	4	+19	25	Qualification for promotion play-offs
2	Dordrecht	10	7	1	2	16	13	+3	22	
3	ADO Den Haag	10	6	2	2	24	14	+10	20	
4	De Graafschap	10	6	1	3	18	14	+4	19	
5	Willem II	10	5	3	2	19	10	+9	18	Period 2 winner
6	Roda JC Kerkrade	10	4	5	1	19	12	+7	17	Period 1 winner
7	VVV-Venlo	10	4	4	2	15	14	+1	16	
8	Jong AZ	10	4	3	3	18	14	+4	15	Reserves teams cannot participate in the promotion play-offs
9	NAC Breda	10	4	3	3	15	13	+2	15	
10	MVV Maastricht	10	4	2	4	22	20	+2	14	
11	Helmond Sport	10	3	5	2	13	12	+1	14	
12	TOP Oss	10	4	0	6	11	19	−8	12	
13	Den Bosch	10	2	5	3	8	13	−5	11	
14	Jong PSV	10	2	4	4	19	21	−2	10	Reserves teams cannot participate in the promotion play-offs
15	Telstar	10	2	4	4	11	16	−5	10	
16	Jong Ajax	10	2	3	5	11	14	−3	9	Reserves teams cannot participate in the promotion play-offs
17	Cambuur	10	2	2	6	17	23	−6	8	
18	Emmen	10	2	1	7	10	20	−10	7	
19	Jong FC Utrecht	10	1	2	7	7	17	−10	5	Reserves teams cannot participate in the promotion play-offs
20	Eindhoven	10	0	5	5	8	21	−13	5	

Source: Keuken Kampioen Divisie (in Dutch)
Rules for classification: 1) points; 2) goal difference; 3) number of goals scored

=== Period 4 ===
Pos	Team	Pld	W	D	L	GF	GA	GD	Pts	Qualification
1	Groningen	9	6	3	0	18	7	+11	21	Period 3 winner
2	Roda JC Kerkrade	9	6	2	1	19	9	+10	20	Period 1 winner
3	Willem II	9	5	4	0	19	8	+11	19	Period 2 winner
4	MVV Maastricht	9	6	1	2	15	11	+4	19	
5	Emmen	9	6	0	3	20	15	+5	18	
6	Dordrecht	9	4	5	0	19	10	+9	17	
7	Jong AZ	9	4	1	4	17	17	0	13	Reserves teams cannot participate in the promotion play-offs
8	Helmond Sport	9	4	1	4	10	12	−2	13	
9	Jong PSV	9	4	0	5	19	19	0	12	Reserves teams cannot participate in the promotion play-offs
10	De Graafschap	9	3	2	4	17	15	+2	11	
11	Telstar	9	3	2	4	18	17	+1	11	
12	TOP Oss	9	3	2	4	9	16	−7	11	
13	NAC Breda	9	2	4	3	12	15	−3	10	
14	Jong Ajax	9	3	1	5	12	17	−5	10	Reserves teams cannot participate in the promotion play-offs
15	Den Bosch	9	3	1	5	11	16	−5	10	
16	ADO Den Haag	9	2	3	4	12	14	−2	9	
17	Eindhoven	9	2	3	4	10	14	−4	9	
18	Cambuur	9	2	2	5	9	15	−6	8	
19	VVV-Venlo	9	2	0	7	8	13	−5	6	
20	Jong FC Utrecht	9	0	3	6	7	21	−14	3	Reserves teams cannot participate in the promotion play-offs

Source: Keuken Kampioen Divisie (in Dutch)
Rules for classification: 1) points; 2) goal difference; 3) number of goals scored

== Results ==
Home \ Away	ADO	CAM	DBO	DOR	EIN	EMM	GRA	GRO	HEL	JAJ	JAZ	JPS	JUT	MVV	NAC	RJC	TEL	TOP	VVV	WIL
ADO Den Haag		1–2	3–0	2–2	1–1	3–0	5–3	0–2	0–1	2–1	4–1	2–3	6–0	2–2	3–1	0–3	1–1	2–1	2–2	1–1
Cambuur	0–2		3–1	3–3	2–2	2–2	1–2	2–1	1–1	4–2	1–2	3–4	2–4	5–2	2–3	1–1	1–0	1–2	3–3	1–0
Den Bosch	1–2	3–1		0–3	0–1	1–2	2–1	1–4	0–0	3–3	0–0	1–2	1–1	3–2	2–2	0–0	1–4	1–0	1–2	1–4
Dordrecht	2–2	5–2	5–1		0–0	2–1	2–1	1–0	2–0	4–0	0–0	1–4	3–3	2–2	2–2	2–0	2–0	3–1	1–0	1–1
Eindhoven	1–1	0–3	2–0	1–1		3–2	0–1	0–3	1–2	2–2	1–1	2–5	3–0	0–3	2–0	1–1	1–1	0–0	0–2	1–1
Emmen	2–3	2–0	1–0	2–4	0–0		2–1	0–3	3–0	4–2	2–1	1–0	2–0	1–3	2–3	0–1	2–0	0–1	2–2	2–0
De Graafschap	0–0	2–3	2–0	1–1	2–1	0–1		2–1	2–1	0–2	2–1	4–2	2–2	3–0	1–0	0–0	5–1	2–1	3–0	0–2
Groningen	0–1	3–0	0–3	2–2	2–1	0–0	4–2		0–0	4–1	4–1	4–0	2–1	3–0	1–1	2–0	2–0	3–0	2–1	0–0
Helmond Sport	3–2	2–1	1–0	1–1	2–0	1–2	3–1	1–2		3–1	3–1	2–2	4–0	1–2	1–0	3–3	1–0	1–1	1–1	0–2
Jong Ajax	0–0	2–1	0–2	2–2	1–1	3–3	1–2	0–1	4–1		1–4	3–0	2–1	3–0	0–1	1–1	0–3	1–0	3–0	1–0
Jong AZ	1–2	2–0	0–0	5–1	0–0	3–2	3–0	0–5	2–1	5–2		4–1	1–0	2–3	2–3	1–0	3–1	3–0	2–1	0–2
Jong PSV	1–2	3–1	2–2	0–1	3–4	3–0	1–3	2–3	2–1	2–2	1–2		2–0	2–3	0–5	2–3	1–0	4–1	0–0	1–1
Jong FC Utrecht	0–2	3–2	0–2	1–1	2–5	2–3	2–0	1–0	0–1	0–1	1–2	0–0		1–1	1–1	1–0	0–0	0–3	0–0	1–1
MVV Maastricht	0–3	1–1	1–0	1–3	0–1	1–1	1–2	1–1	3–0	2–1	4–0	3–3	3–0		1–4	0–3	6–1	2–0	2–0	1–1
NAC Breda	2–2	1–2	1–0	1–4	2–2	1–3	0–0	3–2	1–1	1–1	2–1	2–0	3–1	1–2		1–3	3–1	2–0	1–0	1–2
Roda JC Kerkrade	2–2	2–0	4–1	4–1	3–0	3–2	1–1	0–0	4–1	2–1	3–1	2–1	0–0	1–0	3–1		3–0	2–0	2–1	0–1
Telstar	3–1	2–3	0–0	0–2	0–1	2–3	1–2	1–1	3–2	3–2	1–1	3–1	5–1	2–1	1–1	1–1		1–0	1–2	1–5
TOP Oss	1–3	1–8	1–2	0–1	2–1	0–1	0–1	0–2	1–0	2–1	1–1	4–1	2–0	0–1	1–1	1–4	1–0		2–1	0–5
VVV-Venlo	2–1	1–2	2–3	3–1	2–2	2–0	2–0	0–1	0–4	2–0	2–2	3–2	4–1	1–3	3–1	1–1	2–1	2–0		1–3
Willem II	2–1	1–1	3–1	2–0	3–0	3–0	4–2	1–1	4–1	1–1	4–1	3–0	2–1	2–1	1–4	2–3	3–2	2–1	2–0	

Source: Soccerway, Keuken Kampioen Divisie (in Dutch)
Legend: Blue = home team win; Yellow = draw; Red = away team win.

== Play-offs ==
=== Promotion/relegation play-offs ===
==== Bracket ====
First round
ADO Den Haag	3	2	5
De Graafschap	2	2	4
Dordrecht	2	0	2
Emmen	2	1	3
Roda JC Kerkrade	1	0	1
NAC Breda	3	5	8

Semi-finals
Excelsior	2	7	9
ADO Den Haag	1	1	2
Emmen	1	0	1
NAC Breda	1	3	4

Final
Excelsior	2	4	6
NAC Breda	6	1	7

==== First round ====
13 May 2024
20:00

NAC Breda	3–1	Roda JC Kerkrade
Haugen 16'; Janošek 56' (pen.), 58'	Report	Koglin 87'

Rat Verlegh Stadion, Breda
Attendance: 17,153
Referee: Ingmar Oostrom
17 May 2024
20:00

Roda JC Kerkrade	0–5	NAC Breda
	Report	Kemper 44'; Janošek 49'; Kuijpers 59'; Koscelník 75'; Haugen 79'

Parkstad Limburg Stadion, Kerkrade
Attendance: 11,523
Referee: Jannick van der Laan

NAC Breda won 8–1 on aggregate.

14 May 2024
18:45

Emmen	2–2	Dordrecht
Parzyszek 11'; Besuijen 38'	Report	Suray 26'; Bronkhorst 50'

De Oude Meerdijk, Emmen
Attendance: 6,945
Referee: Sander van der Eijk
18 May 2024
16:30

Dordrecht	0–1	Emmen
	Report	Besuijen 88'

M-Scores Stadion, Dordrecht
Attendance: 3,980
Referee: Martin van den Kerkhof

Emmen won 3–2 on aggregate.

14 May 2024
21:00

De Graafschap	2–3	ADO Den Haag
Büttner 13'; Fortes 90+7' (pen.)	Report	Absalem 30'; Van Mieghem 58'; Schalk 66'

De Vijverberg, Doetinchem
Attendance: 10,083
Referee: Marc Nagtegaal
18 May 2024
20:00

ADO Den Haag	2–2	De Graafschap
Schalk 23', 36'	Report	Seuntjens 67'; Fortes 74'

Bingoal Stadium, The Hague
Attendance: 9,195
Referee: Alex Bos

ADO Den Haag won 5–4 on aggregate.

==== Semi-finals ====
21 May 2024
20:00

NAC Breda	1–1	Emmen
Haugen 38'	Report	Besuijen 82' (pen.)

Rat Verlegh Stadion, Breda
Attendance: 18,361
Referee: Marc Nagtegaal
25 May 2024
16:30

Emmen	0–3	NAC Breda
	Report	Haugen 12'; Van den Bergh 14'; Kuijpers 56'

De Oude Meerdijk, Emmen
Attendance: 8,309
Referee: Rob Dieperink

NAC Breda won 4–1 on aggregate.

22 May 2024
18:45

ADO Den Haag	1–2	Excelsior
Veerman 71'	Report	Driouech 16'; Duijvestijn 23'

Bingoal Stadium, The Hague
Attendance: 11,935
Referee: Sander van der Eijk
25 May 2024
20:00

Excelsior	7–1	ADO Den Haag
Parrott 3', 27', 31' (pen.); Driouech 40'; Baas 55' (pen.); Goudmijn 71'; Lamprou 72'	Report	Veerman 45+2'

Van Donge & De Roo Stadion, Rotterdam
Attendance: 4,400
Referee: Jeroen Manschot

Excelsior won 9–2 on aggregate.

==== Final ====
28 May 2024
20:00

NAC Breda	6–2	Excelsior
Omgba 12'; Janošek 39' (pen.); Van den Bergh 42'; Koscelník 74'; Ómarsson 78', 90+4'	Report	Duijvestijn 25'; Parrott 45+6' (pen.)

Rat Verlegh Stadion, Breda
Attendance: 19,000
Referee: Dennis Higler
2 June 2024
18:00

Excelsior	4–1	NAC Breda
Parrott 20', 35' (pen.), 50'; Kemper 42' (o.g.)	Report	Staring 58'

Van Donge & De Roo Stadion, Rotterdam
Attendance: 4,500
Referee: Danny Makkelie

NAC Breda won 7–6 on aggregate.

== Statistics ==
=== Top scorers ===
As of 10 May 2024

Rank	Player	Club	Goals
1	(Netherlands) Henk Veerman	ADO Den Haag	23
2	(Netherlands) Martijn Kaars	Helmond Sport	21
3	(Netherlands) Milan Smit	Cambuur	19
4	(Netherlands) Romano Postema	Groningen	18
5	(Suriname) Jeredy Hilterman	Willem II	16
5	(Poland) Kacper Kostorz	Den Bosch	16
5	(Netherlands) Dailon Livramento	MVV Maastricht	16
8	(Netherlands) Zakaria Eddahchouri	Telstar	14
9	(Belgium) Mathis Suray	Dordrecht	13
10	(Latvia) Roberts Uldriķis	Cambuur	12
10	(Netherlands) Walid Ould-Chikh	Roda JC Kerkrade	12
10	(Netherlands) Thijs Oosting	Willem II	12
10	(Azerbaijan) Ozan Kökçü	Eindhoven	12
10	(Venezuela) Enrique Peña Zauner	Roda JC Kerkrade	12
10	(Netherlands) Ernest Poku	Jong AZ	12

== Attendances ==
FC Groningen drew the highest average home attendance in the 2023-24 edition of the Eerste Divisie.

#	Football club	Home games	Average attendance
1	FC Groningen	19	20,217
2	NAC Breda	19	17,557
3	Willem II	19	13,292
4	De Graafschap	19	10,178
5	Cambuur Leeuwarden	19	9,700
6	Roda JC	19	9,669
7	ADO Den Haag	19	7,586
8	FC Emmen	19	7,427
9	VVV-Venlo	19	5,486
10	MVV Maastricht	19	5,454
11	FC Den Bosch	19	4,865
12	FC Dordrecht	19	2,821
13	FC Eindhoven	19	2,782
14	Telstar	19	2,217
15	Helmond Sport	19	2,153
16	TOP Oss	19	1,924
17	Jong Ajax	19	795
18	Jong PSV	19	770
19	Jong AZ	19	569
20	Jong FC Utrecht	19	470
