= 2023–24 FC Den Bosch season =

FC Den Bosch
2023–24 season
- Manager: Tomasz Kaczmarek
- Stadium: De Vliert
- Eerste Divisie: 17th
- KNVB Cup: First round
- Top goalscorer: League: Kacper Kostorz (3); All: Kacper Kostorz (3)
- Average home league attendance: 4,865
- All statistics correct as of 22 September 2023.

The 2023–24 season is FC Den Bosch's 59th season in existence and 19th consecutive in the Eerste Divisie. They will also compete in the KNVB Cup.

== Players ==
=== First-team squad ===
As of 31 August 2023

Note: Flags indicate national team as defined under FIFA eligibility rules; some limited exceptions apply. Players may hold more than one non-FIFA nationality.

No.	Pos.	Nation	Player
3	DF	NED	Victor van den Bogert
4	MF	NED	Yuya Ikeshita
6	MF	USA	Gedion Zelalem
7	MF	MAR	Anass Ahannach
8	MF	NED	Steven van der Heijden
9	FW	NED	Vieiri Kotzebue
11	FW	NED	Danny Verbeek
14	DF	NED	Nick de Groot
15	DF	NED	Teun van Grunsven
16	MF	CUW	Jaron Vicario
17	FW	LTU	Tomas Kalinauskas
18	DF	NED	Rik Mulders
19	FW	NED	Sebastiaan van Bakel
20	MF	NED	Ryan Leijten
21	GK	SUR	Joey Roggeveen

No.	Pos.	Nation	Player
22	MF	MAR	Faris Hammouti
24	DF	NED	Stan Maas
27	DF	JAM	Ricardo Henning
30	MF	GEO	Shalva Ogbaidze
31	GK	NED	Lars Vrolijks
40	MF	NED	Ilias Boumassaoudi
41	MF	NED	Rhino Goutier
45	DF	NED	Dennis Gyamfi
47	FW	NED	Sheddy Barglan
75	GK	POL	Jakub Ojrzyński (on loan from Liverpool)
99	FW	POL	Kacper Kostorz (on loan from Pogoń Szczecin)
—	DF	ENG	Luke Mbete (on loan from Manchester City)
—	MF	NED	Salah-Eddine Oulad M'Hand (on loan from Arsenal)
—	FW	NED	Timo Regouin

== Transfers ==
=== In ===
Pos.	Player	Transferred from	Fee	Date	Source

=== Out ===
Pos.	Player	Transferred to	Fee	Date	Source

== Pre-season and friendlies ==
Win Draw Loss Fixtures

14 July 2023 Friendly	Jong PSV (Netherlands)	0–0	(Netherlands) Den Bosch

21 July 2023 Friendly	Dordrecht (Netherlands)	2–0	(Netherlands) Den Bosch

22 July 2023 Friendly	Go Ahead Eagles (Netherlands)	2–1	(Netherlands) Den Bosch

28 July 2023 Friendly	Beerschot (Belgium)	1–0	(Netherlands) Den Bosch

4 August 2023 Friendly	Den Bosch (Netherlands)	2–1	(Netherlands) De Graafschap

== Competitions ==
=== Overall record ===
Competition	First match	Last match	Starting round	Final position	Record							
Competition	First match	Last match	Starting round	Final position	Pld	W	D	L	GF	GA	GD	Win %
Eerste Divisie	11 August 2023	10 May 2024	Matchday 1		29	5	8	16	27	52	−25	17.24
KNVB Cup	1 November 2023		First round	First round	1	0	0	1	1	2	−1	0.00
Total					30	5	8	17	28	54	−26	16.67

Last updated: 8 March 2024
Source: Soccerway

=== Eerste Divisie ===
==== League table ====
Pos	Team	Pld	W	D	L	GF	GA	GD	Pts	Promotion or qualification
16	Jong PSV	38	11	7	20	63	81	−18	40	Reserve teams are not eligible to be promoted to the Eredivisie
17	Telstar	38	9	8	21	47	68	−21	35	
18	TOP Oss	38	10	4	24	32	66	−34	34	
19	Den Bosch	38	8	9	21	38	68	−30	33	
20	Jong FC Utrecht	38	5	11	22	32	74	−42	26	Reserve teams are not eligible to be promoted to the Eredivisie

Source: Flashscore, Keuken Kampioen Divisie (in Dutch)
Rules for classification: Season in progress: 1) Most points won; 2) Less points lost; 3) Goal difference; 4) Goals scored; 5) Alphabetical order; End of season: 1) Points; 2) Goal difference; 3) Goals scored; 4) Head-to-head points; 5) Head-to-head goal difference; 6) Head-to-head away goals scored; 7) Play-off if relevant for deciding champion, relegation or participating in a European league, otherwise by draw. 8) Penalty shoot-out (only after a play-off)

==== Results summary ====
Overall								Home						Away					
Pld	W	D	L	GF	GA	GD	Pts	W	D	L	GF	GA	GD	W	D	L	GF	GA	GD
29	5	8	16	27	52	−25	23	3	5	7	16	26	−10	2	3	9	11	26	−15

Last updated: 8 March 2024.

==== Results by round ====
Round	1	2	3	4	5	6	7	8	9	10	11	12	13	14	15	16	17	18	19	20
Ground	H	A	H	H	A	H	A	A	H	A	H	A	H	A	H	A	H	A	H	H
Result	W	L	L	L	L	W	L	W	L	L	L	L	D	L	L	L	D	D	L	W
Position	4	10	15	18	18	17	17	15	17	17	17	18	18	19	19	19	19	19	19	18

Updated to match(es) played on 22 December 2023. Source:
A = Away; H = Home; W = Win; D = Draw; L = Loss

==== Matches ====
The league fixtures were unveiled on 30 June 2023.

11 August 2023 1	Den Bosch	1–0	TOP Oss	's-Hertogenbosch
20:00 CEST (UTC+2)	Kostorz 68'	Report		Stadium: De Vliert; Attendance: 4,201; Referee: Richard Martens

18 August 2023 2	Helmond Sport	1–0	Den Bosch	Helmond「
20:00 CEST (UTC+2)	Botos 27'	Report		Stadium: GS Staalwerken Stadion; Attendance: 2,024; Referee: Marc Nagtegaal

25 August 2023 3	Den Bosch	1–2	ADO Den Haag	's-Hertogenbosch
20:00 CEST (UTC+2)	Boumassaoudi 74'	Report	Sellouki 54'; Van Mieghem 86'	Stadium: De Vliert; Attendance: 3,999; Referee: Martin van den Kerkhof

1 September 2023 4	Den Bosch	1–2	Jong PSV	's-Hertogenbosch
20:00 CEST (UTC+2)	Ikeshita 10'	Report	Bars 24'; Dağaşan 26'	Stadium: De Vliert; Attendance: 6,900; Referee: Wouter Wiersma

9 September 2023 5	Cambuur	3–1	Den Bosch	Leeuwarden
18:45 CEST (UTC+2)	Balk 9', 16'; Smit 63' (pen.)	Report	Mulders 37'	Stadium: Cambuur Stadion; Attendance: 9,411; Referee: Nick Smit

15 September 2023 6	Den Bosch	3–2	MVV Maastricht	's-Hertogenbosch
20:00 CEST (UTC+2)	Vicario 67'; Kostorz 83', 85'	Report	Slegers 52'; El Basri 73'	Stadium: De Vliert; Attendance: 4,145; Referee: Simon Bourdeaud'hui (Belgium)

22 September 2023 7	Roda JC Kerkrade	4–1	Den Bosch	Kerkrade
20:00 CEST (UTC+2)	Schmid 45'; Peña Zauner 76'; Daneels 85'; Güçlü 90+1'	Report	Didden 86' (o.g.)	Stadium: Parkstad Limburg Stadion; Referee: Sander van der Eijk

29 September 2023 8	Groningen	0–3	Den Bosch	Groningen
20:00 CEST (UTC+2)	Valente (yellow card) 10'; Määttä (yellow card) 75'; Postema (yellow card) 87'	Report	Ogbaidze (yellow card) 43' (goal) 67'; Kostorz 52' (yellow card) 77'; Yuya Ikeshita (yellow card) 55'; Gyamfi (yellow card) 70'; Mbete (yellow card) 87'; Ilias Boumassaoudi 90+6'; Leijten (yellow card) 90+7'	Stadium: Euroborg; Attendance: 19,962; Referee: (Netherlands) Martin Pérez

6 October 2023 9	Den Bosch	0–1	Den Bosch	's-Hertogenbosch
20:00 CEST (UTC+2)		Report	Kökçü 55'	Stadium: De Vliert; Attendance: 5,108; Referee: (Netherlands) Robin Hensgens

15 October 2023 10	Willem II	3–1	Den Bosch	Tilburg
14:30 CEST (UTC+2)	Sigurgeirsson (yellow card) 15'; Hilterman 30'; Bokila 68' 88' (pen.)	Report	Kostorz 11'; Zelalem (yellow card) 44'; van den Bogert (yellow card) 64'; Ojrzyński (yellow card) 87'	Stadium: Koning Willem II Stadion; Attendance: 10,594; Referee: (Netherlands) Martijn Vos

20 October 2023 11	Den Bosch	1–2	VVV	's-Hertogenbosch
20:00 CEST (UTC+2)	Ilias Boumassaoudi 14' (yellow card) 29'; Zelalem (red card) 67'; Oulad M'Hand (yellow card) 78'	Report	Sierra (yellow card) 35'; Timber 47'; Berden 48'	Stadium: De Vliert; Attendance: 4,337; Referee: (Netherlands) Laurens Gerrets

27 October 2023 12	Dordrecht	5–1	Den Bosch	Dordrecht
20:00 CEST (UTC+2)	Rene Kriwak 2'; Segecic 17' 25'; Suray (yellow card) 45+1' (goal) 82' (pen.); Shein 62'; Hilton (yellow card) 74'	Report	Mbete 24'; Ogbaidze (yellow card) 38'	Stadium: Matchoholic Stadion; Attendance: 2,319; Referee: (Netherlands) Jannick van der Laan

4 November 2023 13	Den Bosch	1–1	Jong FC Utrecht	's-Hertogenbosch
18:45 CET (UTC+1)	Mulders (yellow card) 27'; Zelalem (yellow card) 50'; Ilias Boumassaoudi 54'; Yuya Ikeshita (yellow card) 71'	Report	Nazjir Held (yellow card) 68'; Rafik El Arguioui 72'; Adrian Blake (yellow card) 83'	Stadium: De Vliert; Attendance: 4,096; Referee: (Netherlands) Robin Vereijken

10 November 2023 14	Emmen	1–0	Den Bosch	Emmen
20:00 CET (UTC+1)	El Messaoudi (yellow card) 34'; Vlak 39' (pen.)	Report	van Grunsven (yellow card) 38'; Mulders (yellow card) 72'	Stadium: De Oude Meerdijk; Attendance: 7,234; Referee: (Netherlands) Robin Hensgens

17 November 2023 15	Den Bosch	1–4	Telstar	's-Hertogenbosch
18:45 CET (UTC+1)	Kostorz (yellow card) 31'; Maas (yellow card) 31'; Ricardo Henning (yellow card) 37'; Leijten 61'	Report	Eddahchouri 38' (pen.) 51' 73'; Overtoom 56'; Koswal (yellow card) 60'	Stadium: De Vliert; Attendance: 4,497; Referee: (Netherlands) Michael Eijgelsheim

24 November 2023 16	NAC Breda	1–0	Den Bosch	Breda
20:00 CET (UTC+1)	Haugen 63'	Report	Nick de Groot (yellow card) 60'; Mbete (yellow card) 65' (yellow-red card) 70'; Yuya Ikeshita (yellow card) 90+5'	Stadium: Rat Verlegh Stadion; Attendance: 16,758; Referee: (Netherlands) Sander van der Eijk

1 December 2023 17	Den Bosch	3–3	Jong Ajax	's-Hertogenbosch
20:00 CET (UTC+1)	Kostorz 4' 9'; Mulders 39' (yellow card) 90+8'; Roggeveen (yellow card) 79'	Report	Gooijer 12' 83'; Godts (yellow card) 31' (goal) 88' (pen.); Banel (yellow card) 77'; Dies Janse (yellow card) 90+7'	Stadium: De Vliert; Attendance: 4,812; Referee: (Netherlands) Martijn Vos

11 December 2023 18	Jong AZ	0–0	Den Bosch	Wijdewormer
20:00 CET (UTC+1)		Report	Zelalem (yellow card) 79'	Stadium: Sportcomplex Kalverhoek; Attendance: 400; Referee: (Netherlands) Robin Vereijken

15 December 2023 19	Den Bosch	0–4	De Graafschap	's-Hertogenbosch
20:00 CET (UTC+1)		Report	Colyn 26'; Schenk 45+1'; Brittijn 55'; Doğan 65'	Stadium: De Vliert; Attendance: 6,044; Referee: (Netherlands) Kevin Puts

22 December 2023 20	Den Bosch	3–1	Cambuur	's-Hertogenbosch
20:00 CET (UTC+1)	Kostorz 12'; Nick de Groot (yellow card) 46'; Maas 68'; Mulders (yellow card) 69'; Sebastiaan van Bakel 90+2'	Report	Smand (yellow card) 36' (yellow-red card) 62'; Smit 81' (yellow card) 86'	Stadium: De Vliert; Attendance: 4,117; Referee: (Netherlands) Richard Martens

=== KNVB Cup ===
1 November 2023 First round	Den Bosch	1–2 (a.e.t.)	Excelsior	's-Hertogenbosch
21:00 CET (UTC+1)	Mulders (yellow card) 77'; Vicario 90+7'; Ogbaidze (yellow card) 111'	Report	Horemans 37'; Baas 96' (pen.)	Stadium: De Vliert; Referee: (Netherlands) Pol van Boekel
