= Ryan Leijten =

Dutch footballer (born 2003)

Ryan Leijten 杨瑞安·赖腾
Personal information
- Full name: Ryan Yang Leijten
- Date of birth: 18 September 2003 (age 23)
- Place of birth: 's-Hertogenbosch, Netherlands
- Height: 1.89 m (6 ft 2 in)
- Position: Midfielder

Team information
- Current team: Lokomotiv Plovdiv
- Number: 11

Youth career
- RKSV Boxtel
- –2014: Willem II/RKC
- 2014–2017: Brabant United
- 2017–2021: Den Bosch

Senior career*
Years	Team	Apps	(Gls)
2021–2024	Den Bosch	84	(7)
2024–2026	Roda JC	34	(2)
2026–	Lokomotiv Plovdiv	6	(1)
- * Club domestic league appearances and goals as of 20 September 2026

Ryan Leijten
- Simplified Chinese: 杨瑞安·赖腾
- Traditional Chinese: 楊瑞安·賴騰
Transcriptions
Standard Mandarin
- Hanyu Pinyin: Yáng Ruì'ān Lài Téng

Ryan Yang Leijten (Chinese: 杨瑞安·赖腾; pinyin: Yáng Ruì'ān Lài Téng; born 18 September 2003) is a Dutch professional footballer who plays as a midfielder for Bulgarian First League club Lokomotiv Plovdiv.

== Career ==
=== Den Bosch ===
Leijten was born in 2003 in 's-Hertogenbosch, Netherlands, to a Dutch father and Chinese mother. He grew up in nearby Boxtel.

Leijten progressed through the youth systems of RKSV Boxtel, the joint Willem II and RKC Waalwijk academy, and Brabant United, the joint academy of FC Den Bosch and RKC Waalwijk. In September 2020, he underwent a ten-day trial with Serie A club Napoli, though it did not result in a contract.

He made his professional debut for Den Bosch on 12 May 2021, in a 3–1 away loss to MVV. Leijten was included in the squad as a youth player due to the absence of seventeen first-team players, ten of whom were sidelined following positive COVID-19 tests. He entered the match as an 85th-minute substitute for Stan Maas. On 6 August 2021, during his starting debut in a home match against Helmond Sport, Leijten scored his first professional goal, converting a corner kick from Sebastiaan van Bakel in the 64th minute to make it 1–0. On 18 September 2021, Leijten signed a three-year contract on his eighteenth birthday.

Leijten made 86 total appearances for Den Bosch, in which he scored seven goals. He left the club at the end of the 2023–24 season, as his contract was not extended.

=== Roda JC ===
Leijten joined Roda JC after a three-week trial, signing a three-year contract on 9 August 2024 and taking the number 20 shirt. Technical manager Rob Servais cited his experience—86 matches for FC Den Bosch—and his physical attributes, and said the club believed he had further potential to develop. He made his debut three days later, replacing Joshua Schwirten after 63 minutes of the opening fixture of the season, a 6–1 defeat away to Jong AZ. He scored his first goal for the club on 26 November, in a 3–0 home win over Vitesse.

Leijten played little in his second season, and on 12 August 2026 his contract, which had a year left to run, was terminated by mutual consent. He had made 36 appearances for Roda JC and scored twice.

=== Lokomotiv Plovdiv ===
On 12 August 2026, Leijten moved to Lokomotiv Plovdiv in Bulgaria on a two-season deal.

== Style of play ==
Leijten mainly operates as a midfielder and has been compared to Germany international Kai Havertz.

== Personal life ==
Leijten can speak Chinese and Dutch.

== Career statistics ==
As of match played 20 September 2026

Appearances and goals by club, season and competition
Club	Season	League			Cup		Other		Total	
Club	Season	Division	Apps	Goals	Apps	Goals	Apps	Goals	Apps	Goals
Den Bosch	2020–21	Eerste Divisie	1	0	—		—		1	0
Den Bosch	2021–22	Eerste Divisie	32	3	0	0	—		32	3
Den Bosch	2022–23	Eerste Divisie	30	3	1	0	—		31	3
Den Bosch	2023–24	Eerste Divisie	21	1	1	0	—		22	1
Den Bosch	Total		84	7	2	0	—		86	7
Roda JC	2024–25	Eerste Divisie	28	2	1	0	—		29	2
Roda JC	2025–26	Eerste Divisie	6	0	1	0	0	0	7	0
Roda JC	Total		34	2	2	0	0	0	36	2
Lokomotiv Plovdiv	2026–27	Bulgarian First League	6	1	0	0	—		6	1
Career total			124	10	4	0	0	0	128	10
