= Kacper Kostorz =

Polish footballer (born 1999)

Personal information
- Full name: Kacper Kostorz
- Date of birth: 21 August 1999 (age 27)
- Place of birth: Cieszyn, Poland
- Height: 1.91 m (6 ft 3 in)
- Position: Forward

Team information
- Current team: Polonia Warsaw
- Number: 9

Youth career
- Mieszko Piast Cieszyn
- Pasjonat Dankowice
- Podbeskidzie Bielsko-Biała
- 2011–2013: MFK Karviná
- 2013–2014: Górnik Zabrze
- 2014–2015: Piast Cieszyn

Senior career*
Years	Team	Apps	(Gls)
2015–2019	Podbeskidzie Bielsko-Biała	55	(3)
2019–2022	Legia Warsaw	12	(1)
2019–2021	Legia Warsaw II	15	(9)
2019–2020	→ Miedź Legnica (loan)	15	(2)
2022–2026	Pogoń Szczecin	15	(0)
2022–2025	Pogoń Szczecin II	4	(3)
2023	→ Korona Kielce (loan)	12	(2)
2023	→ Korona Kielce II (loan)	1	(0)
2023–2024	→ Den Bosch (loan)	38	(16)
2024–2025	→ NAC Breda (loan)	24	(3)
2026–	Polonia Warsaw	14	(2)

International career
2017	Poland U19	2	(0)
2018–2019	Poland U20	2	(0)
- * Club domestic league appearances and goals as of 15:26, 29 May 2026 (UTC)

Kacper Kostorz (born 21 August 1999) is a Polish professional footballer who plays as a forward for I liga club Polonia Warsaw.

== Career ==
Kostorz started his career with Podbeskidzie Bielsko-Biała. On 7 January 2022, he moved from Legia Warsaw to Pogoń Szczecin. On 17 February 2023, Kostorz was loaned until the end of the season with an option to make the move permanent to another Ekstraklasa side, Korona Kielce.

On 11 July 2023, Kostorz joined Eerste Divisie side Den Bosch on a season-long loan, with an option to make the move permanent. In the 2023–24 season, he scored 16 goals in 38 appearances and was named the club's Player of the Year, before announcing he would leave Den Bosch following the expiration of his loan.

On 9 July 2024, Kostorz moved on loan with an option to buy to Eredivisie club NAC Breda until the end of the season.

On 15 January 2026, Kostorz terminated his contract with Pogoń by mutual consent. Four days later, he signed a three-and-a-half-year deal for I liga club Polonia Warsaw.

== Honours ==
Legia Warsaw

- Ekstraklasa: 2019–20, 2020–21

Individual

- Den Bosch Player of the Year: 2023–24
