= Regillio Simons =

Dutch football manager (born 1973)

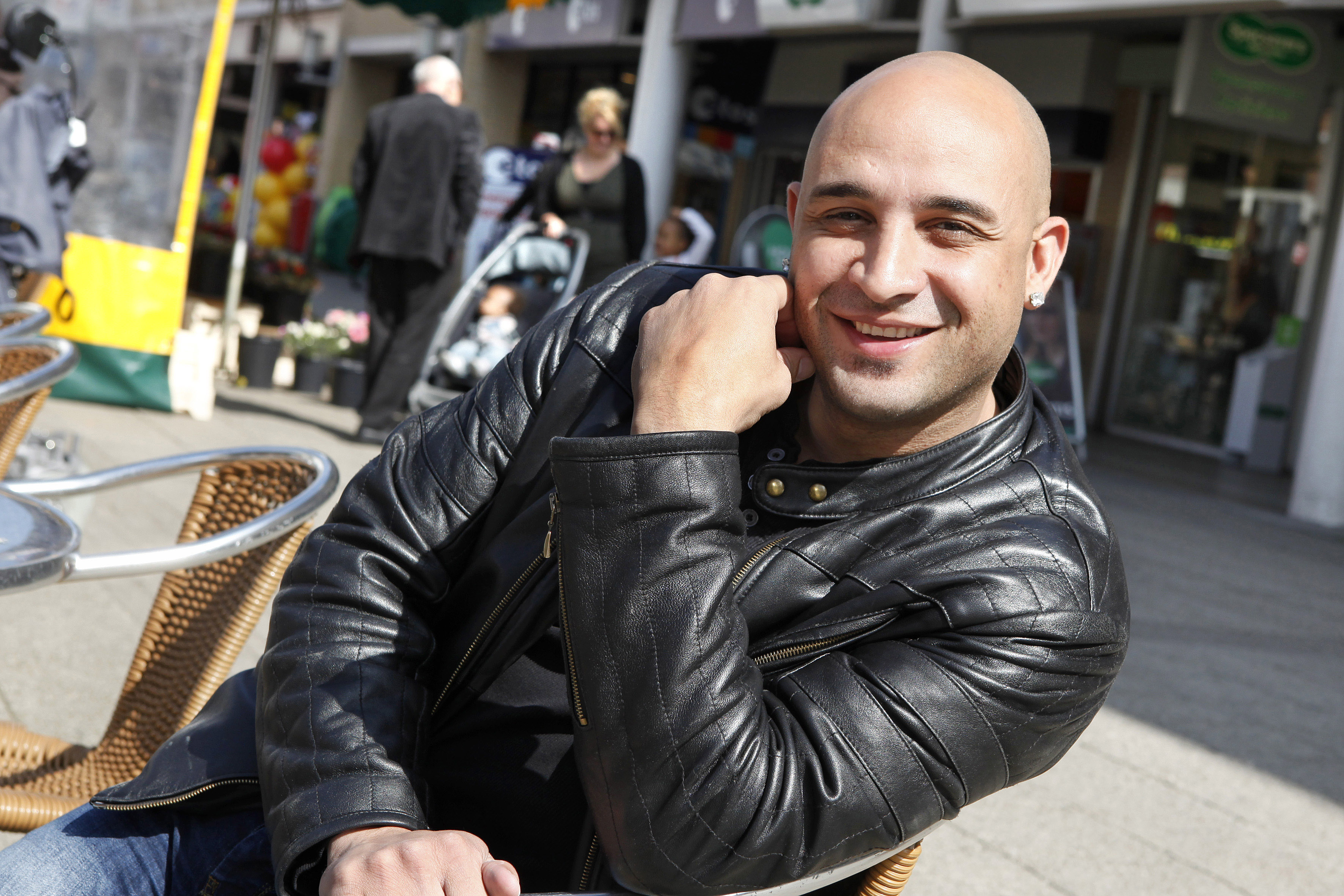
- Simons in 2011

Personal information
- Date of birth: 28 June 1973 (age 53)
- Place of birth: Amsterdam, Netherlands
- Height: 1.83 m (6 ft 0 in)
- Position: Striker

Youth career
- Amstelland

Senior career*
Years	Team	Apps	(Gls)
1993–1995	Telstar		
1995–1999	Fortuna Sittard	101	(16)
1999–2001	NAC Breda	56	(12)
2002	Fortuna Sittard	7	(0)
2002–2003	Willem II	21	(0)
2003	Kyoto Purple Sanga	7	(2)
2004	ADO Den Haag	15	(3)
2004–2005	TOP Oss	12	(0)
2005–2007	Turkiyemspor Amsterdam		
2008–2010	Ajax Amateurs		
Total		219	(33)

Managerial career
- 2005–2008: Turkiyemspor Amsterdam (assistant)
- 2008–2009: JOS Watergraafsmeer (assistant)
- 2009–2011: SV Huizen (assistant)
- 2011–2012: VV Hillegom
- 2012–2013: Voorland
- 2013–2015: Faja Lobi
- 2013–2017: Ajax (youth)
- 2023–2024: Jong Volendam
- 2024: Volendam
- * Club domestic league appearances and goals

Regillio Simons (born 28 June 1973) is a Dutch professional football manager and former player. He is the father of footballer Xavi Simons.

== Playing career ==
Simons started playing football at Amstelland. He played for Telstar, Fortuna Sittard, NAC, Willem II, Kyoto Purple Sanga (Japan), ADO Den Haag and TOP Oss. In his best time he was employed by Fortuna Sittard. In the 1998–99 season, he had a big contribution with two goals in the 1–3 victory over Ajax in Amsterdam Arena. In that same year, he scored four times in the 6–4 home win against PSV Eindhoven. After his professional career ended, he played for Türkiyemspor, an Amsterdam amateur club playing in the top Sunday league. From summer 2008, he played for the Ajax Amateurs for two years.

== Coaching career ==
In 2005, Simons started his coaching career and became a head coach at various clubs. He was appointed head coach of the Volendam under-21 team in 2023, but moved to manage the first team in 2024 after Matthias Kohler's dismissal. After suffering relegation from the Eredivisie with Volendam, both parties mutually agreed to terminate his contract in May 2024.

== Personal life ==
Born in the Netherlands, Simons is of Surinamese descent. One of his two sons, Xavi Simons, is a player for Tottenham Hotspur. Simons obtained the UEFA Pro Licence in 2010.
