= Salah-Eddine Oulad M'Hand =

Dutch footballer (born 2003)

Personal information
- Full name: Zine-Eddine Oulad M'Hand
- Date of birth: 20 August 2003 (age 23)
- Place of birth: The Hague, The Netherlands
- Height: 1.77 m (5 ft 10 in)
- Position: Midfielder

Team information
- Current team: Riga
- Number: 18

Youth career
- –2020: Feyenoord
- 2020–2022: Arsenal

Senior career*
Years	Team	Apps	(Gls)
2022–2025	Arsenal	0	(0)
2022–2023	→ Hull City (loan)	0	(0)
2023–2024	→ Den Bosch (loan)	19	(3)
2026–	Riga	33	(10)

International career
2017	Netherlands U15	1	(0)
- * Club domestic league appearances and goals as of 12 November 2026

Zine-Eddine Oulad M'Hand (born 20 August 2003), known as Salah Oulad M'Hand, is a Dutch professional footballer who plays as a midfielder for Virsliga club Riga FC.

== Club career ==
As a youth player, Oulad M'Hand joined the youth academy of Dutch side Feyenoord. In 2020, he joined the youth academy of English Premier League side Arsenal.

On 23 August 2022, he moved on loan to Hull City for the season, with an option for Hull to purchase the player at the end of the season.

An injury that Oulad M'Hand picked up on Arsenal's pre-season camp in Germany meant that he had not made his first team debut by the time the Championship season took a break for the 2022 FIFA World Cup. During that break, Oulad M'Hand suffered a setback to that injury which meant he did not travel with the Hull City squad to their mid-season training camp in Turkey, with the player instead returning to Arsenal for rehabilitation and aiming to make his debut for Hull before the end of the season.

On 31 August 2023, Oulad M'Hand moved on a new loan to Den Bosch.

He was released by Arsenal in June 2025.

In January 2026 Oulad M'Hand Signed with Latvian side, Riga FC.

== International career ==
Born in the Netherlands, Oulad M'Hand is of Moroccan descent. He is a youth international for the Netherlands, having played for the Netherlands U15s.

== Personal life ==
Oulad M'Hand's brother, Ismail, is also a professional footballer, played together in Arsenal's academy before they were released.

== Career statistics ==
As of 24 June 2024

Appearances and goals by club, season and competition
Club	Season	League			FA Cup		EFL Cup		Other		Total	
Club	Season	Division	Apps	Goals	Apps	Goals	Apps	Goals	Apps	Goals	Apps	Goals
Arsenal	2020–21	Premier League	0	0	0	0	0	0	1 (Note: Appearances in EFL Trophy)	0	1	0
Arsenal	2021–22	Premier League	0	0	0	0	0	0	5	1	5	1
Arsenal	2022–23	Premier League	0	0	0	0	0	0	0	0	0	0
Arsenal	Total		0	0	0	0	0	0	6	1	6	1
Hull City (loan)	2022–23	Championship	0	0	0	0	0	0	0	0	0	0
FC Den Bosch (loan)	2023–24	Eerste Divisie	19	3	1	0	—		—		20	3
Career total			19	0	1	0	0	0	6	1	26	4
