= Shalva Ogbaidze =

Georgian footballer

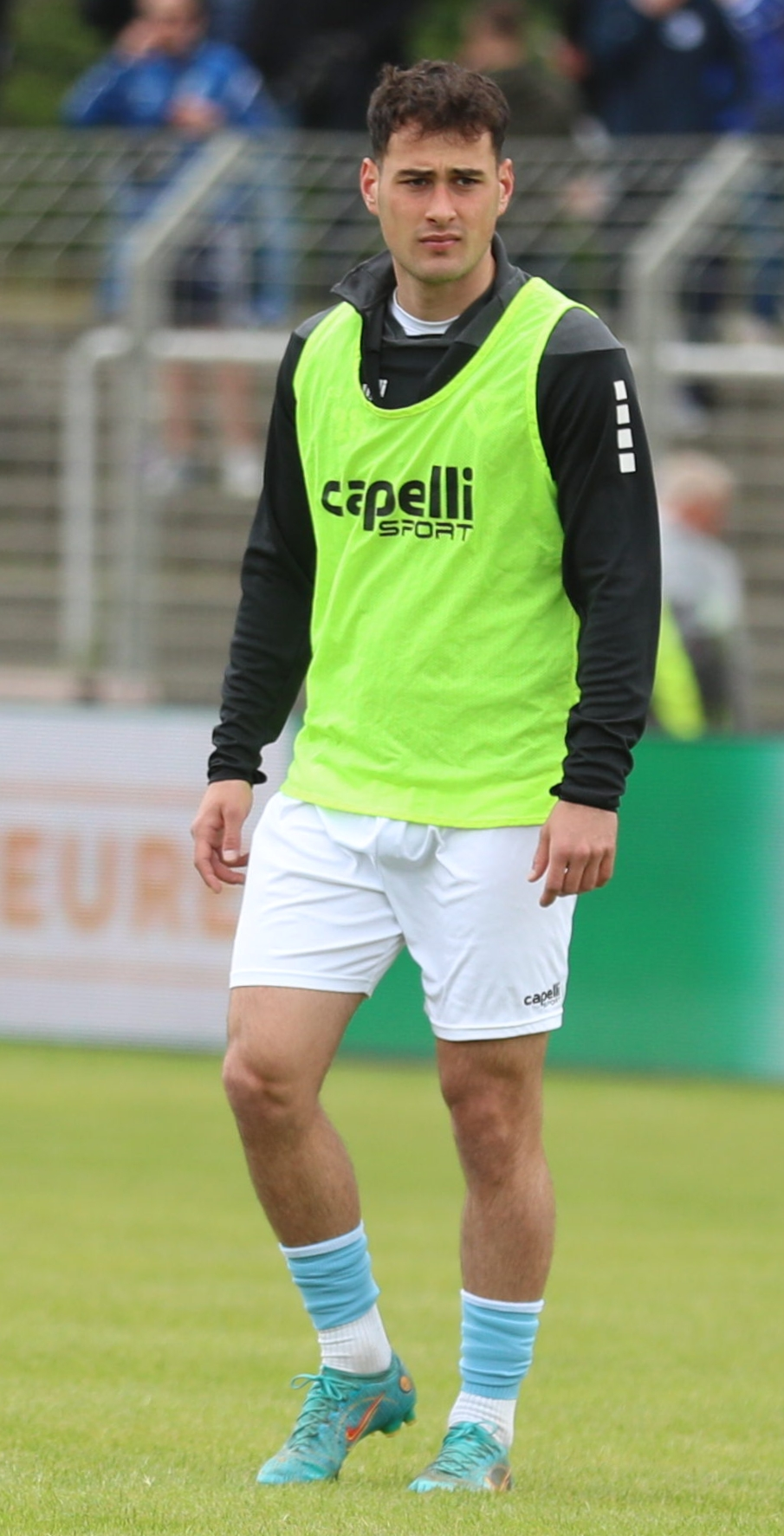
- Ogbaidze in May 2022

Personal information
- Date of birth: 1 August 2002 (age 24)
- Place of birth: Tbilisi, Georgia
- Height: 1.77 m (5 ft 10 in)
- Position: Attacking midfielder

Team information
- Current team: Hertha BSC II
- Number: 22

Youth career
- –2017: BFC Dynamo
- 2017–2020: 1. FC Magdeburg
- 2020–2021: Viktoria Berlin

Senior career*
Years	Team	Apps	(Gls)
2021–2023	Viktoria Berlin	45	(2)
2023–2025	Den Bosch	30	(1)
2025–	Hertha BSC II	58	(6)

International career
2018–2019	Georgia U17	4	(0)
2019	Georgia U18	2	(0)
- * Club domestic league appearances and goals as of 23 September 2026

Shalva Ogbaidze (born 1 August 2002) is a Georgian professional footballer who plays as an attacking midfielder for Regionalliga Nordost club Hertha BSC II.

== Club career ==
After playing youth football for BFC Dynamo, 1. FC Magdeburg and Viktoria Berlin, Ogbaidze was promoted to Viktoria Berlin's first team in summer 2021. He made his professional debut as an 84th-minute substitute in a 2–1 win over Viktoria Köln on 25 July 2021.

In June 2023, Ogbaidze signed for Eerste Divisie club Den Bosch on a free transfer.

== International career ==
Ogbaidze has represented Georgia at under-17 and under-18 international levels.

== Career statistics ==
As of match played 2 December 2022

Appearances and goals by club, season and competition
Club	Season	League			DFB-Pokal		Other		Total	
Club	Season	Division	Apps	Goals	Apps	Goals	Apps	Goals	Apps	Goals
Viktoria Berlin	2021–22	3. Liga	16	0	0	0	0	0	16	0
Viktoria Berlin	2022–23	Regionalliga Nordost	11	0	0	0	0	0	11	0
Career total			27	0	0	0	0	0	27	0
