= Matthias Kohler =

German football manager (born 1991)

Personal information
- Date of birth: 9 June 1991 (age 35)
- Place of birth: Waldshut-Tiengen, Germany
- Position: Midfielder

Team information
- Current team: Volendam

Youth career
- Years: Team
- SV Untermettingen
- SV 08 Laufenburg
- Schaffhausen
- –2010: SC Freiburg

Managerial career
- Cape Town All Stars (youth)
- 2019: AS Trenčín
- 2020–2021: Basel II
- 2021–2023: Volendam (assistant coach)
- 2023: Volendam

Matthias Kohler (born 9 June 1991) is a German football manager who was recently the head coach for Eredivisie club Volendam.

== Playing career ==
As a youth player, Kohler joined the youth academy of German Bundesliga side SC Freiburg after playing for the youth academy of FC Schaffhausen in the Swiss lower leagues.

== Managerial career ==
Kohler started his career with the youth academy of South African club Cape Town All Stars.

In 2019, Kohler was appointed manager of AS Trenčín in the Slovak top flight.

In 2020, he was appointed manager of Swiss third division team FC Basel II.

In June 2023, Eredivisie side Volendam announced that Kohler would become the club's new head coach for the 2023–24 season. On 3 December 2023, Kohler resigned his position of becoming the manager.
