= Elías Már Ómarsson =

Icelandic footballer (born 1995)

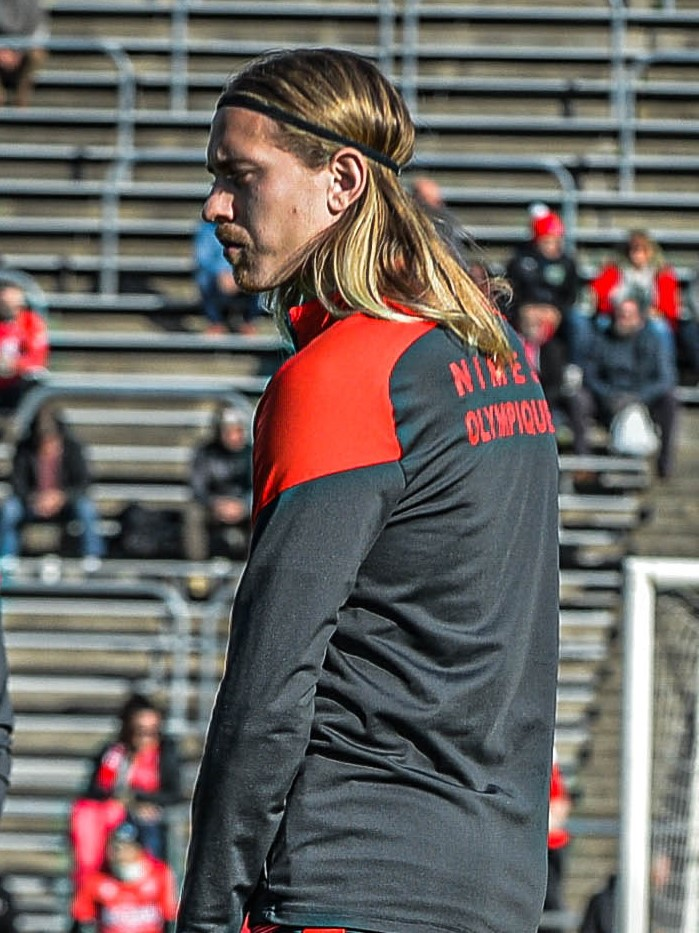
- Elías Már with Nîmes

Personal information
- Date of birth: 18 January 1995 (age 31)
- Place of birth: Keflavík, Iceland
- Height: 1.83 m (6 ft 0 in)
- Position: Forward

Team information
- Current team: Víkingur
- Number: 28

Youth career
- Keflavík

Senior career*
Years	Team	Apps	(Gls)
2012–2014	Keflavík	37	(8)
2015–2016	Vålerenga	28	(6)
2016	→ IFK Göteborg (loan)	13	(6)
2017–2018	IFK Göteborg	37	(8)
2018–2021	Excelsior	88	(41)
2021–2023	Nîmes	41	(7)
2023–2025	NAC Breda	69	(20)
2025	Meizhou Hakka	14	(4)
2026–	Víkingur	14	(12)

International career^{‡}
2011–2012	Iceland U17	9	(1)
2012–2014	Iceland U19	12	(3)
2014–2016	Iceland U21	12	(3)
2015–	Iceland	9	(0)
- * Club domestic league appearances and goals as of 1 November 2026 ‡ National team caps and goals as of 20 November 2020

Elías Már Ómarsson (born 18 January 1995) is an Icelandic professional footballer who plays as a forward for Besta deild karla club Víkingur and the Iceland national team.

== Club career ==
Elías Már started his career with local club Keflavík in 2012. He signed a three-year contract with Vålerenga on 5 February 2015.

In 2016 he went out on loan to Swedish club IFK Göteborg for the second half of the season. He had a clause in the loan contract enabling IFK to buy Ómarsson for a set fee after the loan ended which IFK chose to use.

He moved to the Eredivisie club Excelsior Rotterdam in August 2018.

On 18 January 2023, Elías Már agreed to return to the Netherlands on a one-and-a-half-year contract with NAC Breda.

On 13 July 2025, Elías Már joined Chinese Super League club Meizhou Hakka.

On 21 December 2025, Elías Már signed Besta deild karla club Víkingur with a three-year contract.

== International career ==
Elías Már holds Icelandic and Norwegian nationalities. He made his first appearance for the Iceland national team on 16 January 2015 in a match against Canada, when he came on as a substitute for Rúrik Gíslason with a few minutes left of the match.

== Career statistics ==
As of match played 16 November 2026

Appearances and goals by club, season and competition
Club	Season	League			National cup		Other		Total	
Club	Season	Division	Apps	Goals	Apps	Goals	Apps	Goals	Apps	Goals
Keflavík	2012	Úrvalsdeild	1	0	0	0	—		1	0
Keflavík	2013	Úrvalsdeild	16	2	1	0	7 (Note: Appearances in Icelandic League Cup)	0	24	2
Keflavík	2014	Úrvalsdeild	20	6	3	0	7	4	30	10
Keflavík	Total		37	8	4	0	14	4	55	12
Vålerenga	2015	Tippeligaen	15	4	2	1	—		17	5
Vålerenga	2016	Tippeligaen	13	2	3	2	—		16	4
Vålerenga	Total		28	6	5	3	—		33	9
IFK Göteborg	2016	Allsvenskan	13	6	1	0	—		14	6
IFK Göteborg	2017	Allsvenskan	25	0	5	4	—		30	4
IFK Göteborg	2018	Allsvenskan	12	8	4	1	—		16	9
IFK Göteborg	Total		50	14	10	5	—		60	19
Excelsior	2018–19	Eredivisie	23	7	1	0	2 (Note: Appearances in Eredivisie play-offs)	1	26	8
Excelsior	2019–20	Eerste Divisie	28	12	2	0	—		30	12
Excelsior	2020–21	Eerste Divisie	37	22	4	3	—		41	25
Excelsior	Total		88	41	7	3	2	1	97	45
Nîmes	2021–22	Ligue 2	29	6	3	1	—		32	7
Nîmes	2022–23	Ligue 2	12	1	2	1	—		14	2
Nîmes	Total		41	7	5	2	—		46	9
NAC Breda	2022–23	Eerste Divisie	19	10	1	0	3	1	20	10
NAC Breda	2023–24	Eerste Divisie	26	5	0	0	3	2	24	5
NAC Breda	2024–25	Eredivisie	32	8	1	0	—		33	8
NAC Breda	Total		69	20	2	0	6	3	77	23
Meizhou Hakka	2025	Chinese Super League	14	4	—		—		14	4
Víkingur Reykjavík	2026	Besta deild karla	14	12	4	2	3 (Note: One in Icelandic League Cup, one in Icelandic Super Cup and one in UEFA Champions League)	0	21	14
Career total			341	112	37	15	25	8	403	135

== Honours ==
Individual

- Eredivisie Player of the Month: May 2019
- Eredivisie Team of the Month: October 2024, January 2025
