= Victor van den Bogert =

Dutch footballer (born 1999)

Personal information
- Date of birth: 12 August 1999 (age 27)
- Place of birth: Utrecht, Netherlands
- Height: 1.85 m (6 ft 1 in)
- Position: Centre-back

Team information
- Current team: Katwijk
- Number: 2

Youth career
- Hercules
- –2012: Baronie
- 2012–2019: Willem II

Senior career*
Years	Team	Apps	(Gls)
2019–2021	Willem II	6	(0)
2020	→ De Graafschap (loan)	3	(0)
2021–2025	Den Bosch	100	(3)
2026–	Katwijk	23	(3)
- * Club domestic league appearances and goals as of 18:16, 19 October 2026 (UTC)

Victor van den Bogert (born 12 August 1999) is a Dutch professional footballer who plays as a centre-back for Tweede Divisie club Katwijk.

== Club career ==
On 17 March 2017, van den Bogert signed his first professional contract with Willem II. He made his professional debut for Willem II in a 4–2 Eredivisie loss to SC Heerenveen on 3 March 2019. He became clubless in summer 2025, but was picked up by third-tier Katwijk in January 2026.
