= Boy Kemper =

Dutch footballer (born 1999)

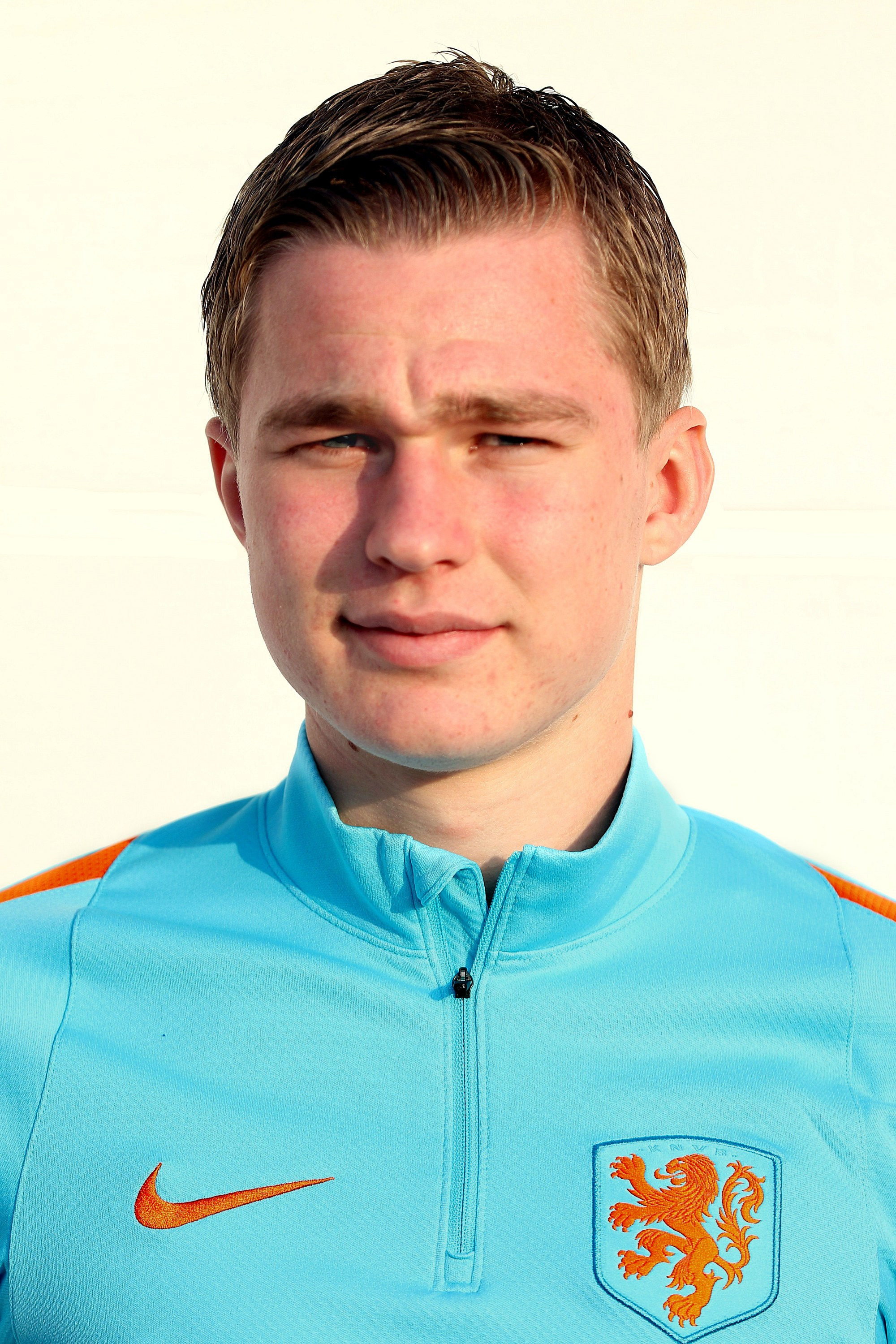
- Kemper with Netherlands U-18 in 2017

Personal information
- Full name: Boy Jacobus Gerardus Maria Kemper
- Date of birth: 21 June 1999 (age 27)
- Place of birth: Purmerend, Netherlands
- Height: 1.85 m (6 ft 1 in)
- Position: Left-back

Team information
- Current team: Queens Park Rangers F.C.
- Number: 12

Youth career
- 2004–2016: FC Volendam
- 2016–2017: Ajax

Senior career*
| Years | Team | Apps | (Gls) |
| 2017–2020 | Jong Ajax | 42 | (1) |
| 2020−2023 | ADO Den Haag | 83 | (4) |
| 2023–2026 | NAC Breda | 82 | (8) |
| 2026– | Queens Park Rangers | 1 | (0) |

International career
| 2016–2017 | Netherlands U18 | 4 | (0) |
| 2017 | Netherlands U19 | 6 | (0) |
- * Club domestic league appearances and goals as of 15:17, 20 June 2026 (UTC)

Boy Jacobus Gerardus Maria Kemper (born 21 June 1999) is a Dutch professional footballer who plays as a left-back for EFL Championship club Queens Park Rangers.

== Club career ==
Kemper made his Eerste Divisie debut for Jong Ajax on 18 August 2017 in a game against SC Cambuur.

In June 2023, Kemper signed for NAC Breda on a three-year contract subject to completing a medical.

In June 2026, Kemper signed for Queens Park Rangers on a free transfer. He signed a contract for three years. He made his debut starting at left back in a 1–1 home draw to Millwall in the first round of the EFL Cup.

== Career statistics ==
As of end of 2025–26 season

Appearances and goals by club, season and competition
| Club | Season | League | | | National Cup | | League Cup | | Other | | Total | |
| Club | Season | Division | Apps | Goals | Apps | Goals | Apps | Goals | Apps | Goals | Apps | Goals |
|---|---|---|---|---|---|---|---|---|---|---|---|---|
| Jong Ajax | 2017–18 | Eerste Divisie | 4 | 0 | — | | — | | — | | 4 | 0 |
| Jong Ajax | 2018–19 | Eerste Divisie | 17 | 0 | — | | — | | — | | 17 | 0 |
| Jong Ajax | 2019–20 | Eerste Divisie | 20 | 1 | — | | — | | — | | 20 | 1 |
| Jong Ajax | Total | | 41 | 1 | — | | — | | — | | 41 | 1 |
| Ajax | 2019–20 | Eredivisie | 0 | 0 | 0 | 0 | — | | 0 | 0 | 0 | 0 |
| ADO Den Haag | 2020–21 | Eredivisie | 26 | 1 | 2 | 0 | — | | — | | 28 | 1 |
| ADO Den Haag | 2021–22 | Eerste Divisie | 32 | 1 | 2 | 0 | — | | 6 | 0 | 40 | 1 |
| ADO Den Haag | 2022–23 | Eerste Divisie | 25 | 2 | 2 | 0 | — | | — | | 27 | 2 |
| ADO Den Haag | Total | | 83 | 4 | 6 | 0 | — | | 6 | 0 | 95 | 4 |
| NAC Breda | 2023–24 | Eerste Divisie | 21 | 2 | 1 | 0 | — | | 5 | 1 | 27 | 3 |
| NAC Breda | 2024–25 | Eredivisie | 29 | 1 | 0 | 0 | — | | 0 | 0 | 29 | 1 |
| NAC Breda | 2025–26 | Eredivisie | 32 | 5 | 1 | 1 | — | | 0 | 0 | 33 | 6 |
| NAC Breda | Total | | 82 | 8 | 2 | 1 | — | | 5 | 1 | 89 | 9 |
| Queens Park Rangers | 2026–27 | EFL Championship | 1 | 0 | 0 | 0 | 0 | 0 | 0 | 0 | 0 | 0 |
| Career total | | | 206 | 13 | 8 | 1 | 0 | 0 | 11 | 1 | 225 | 15 |

== Honours ==
=== Club ===
Jong Ajax

- Eerste Divisie: 2017–18
