= Stan Maas =

Dutch footballer (born 2001)

Personal information
- Date of birth: 14 February 2001 (age 25)
- Place of birth: Liempde, Netherlands
- Height: 1.82 m (6 ft 0 in)
- Position: Left-back

Team information
- Current team: Den Bosch
- Number: 24

Youth career
- 2010–2020: Den Bosch

Senior career*
Years	Team	Apps	(Gls)
2020–	Den Bosch	114	(2)
- * Club domestic league appearances and goals as of 25 April 2026

Stan Maas (born 14 February 2001) is a Dutch professional footballer who plays as a left-back for FC Den Bosch.

== Career ==
From Liempde, Maas He went through the entire youth academy of FC Den Bosch after joining in 2010. Capable of playing at left-back or centre-back, Mass made his senior debut as a substitute on 15 November 2020 in a 3–0 defeat away at Go Ahead Eagles. A week later on 22 November 2020, at home against Jong Ajax, he was named in the starting line-up for the first time.

At the end of the 2021–22 season Maas signed a new two-year professional contract with Den Bosch. On 18 October 2022, Maas scored his first goal in professional football. In the KNVB Cup game away at GVVV, he made it 3–1 in the 77th minute.
