= Aimé Omgba =

Dutch association footballer (born 2002)

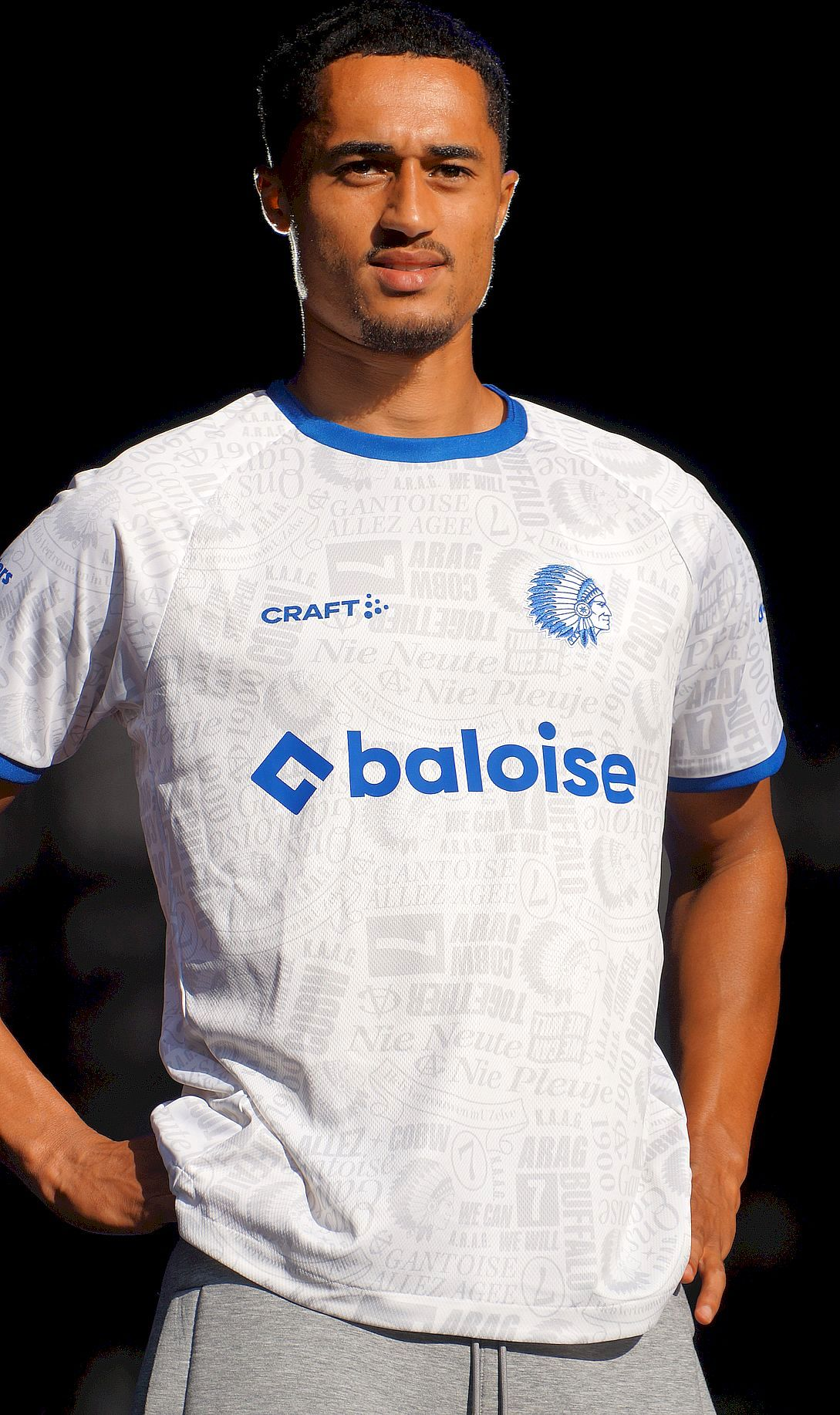

Personal information
- Full name: Aimé Ntsama Omgba
- Date of birth: 22 October 2002 (age 24)
- Place of birth: Leiden, Netherlands
- Height: 1.90 m (6 ft 3 in)
- Position: Midfielder

Team information
- Current team: Gent
- Number: 10

Youth career
- Feyenoord
- 2020–2021: NEC Nijmegen
- 2021–2023: NAC Breda

Senior career*
Years	Team	Apps	(Gls)
2023–2024	NAC Breda	42	(10)
2024–	Gent	37	(1)
2024–2025	Jong Gent	2	(1)
- * Club domestic league appearances and goals as of 25 October 2026

Aimé Ntsama Omgba (born 22 October 2002) is a Dutch professional footballer who plays for Belgian Pro League club Gent as a midfielder.

== Career ==
Born in Leiden, Omgba spent his early career with Feyenoord and NEC Nijmegen, before signing for NAC Breda in 2021. In January 2023 he signed a new two-and-a-half year professional contract with the club. He scored his first professional goal in a match against VVV Venlo.

In January 2024 he was linked with a transfer to Belgian club Anderlecht, although it was stated that he would spend the rest of the season with Breda. In March 2024, he suffered an injury.

On 4 September 2024, Omgba signed a five-season contract with Gent.

== Personal life ==
Omgba is of Cameroonian descent.

== Career statistics ==
As of match played 25 October 2026

Appearances and goals by club, season and competition
Club	Season	League			National cup (Note: Includes KNVB Cup, Belgian Cup)		Other		Total	
Club	Season	Division	Apps	Goals	Apps	Goals	Apps	Goals	Apps	Goals
Jong Feyenoord	2019–20	Beloften Eredivisie	6	0	—		—		6	0
NAC Breda	2022–23	Eerste Divisie	21	2	2	0	—		23	2
NAC Breda	2023–24	Eerste Divisie	31	8	0	0	—		31	8
NAC Breda	Total		42	10	2	0	0	0	44	10
Gent	2024–25	Belgian Pro League	13	1	—		—		13	1
Gent	2025–26	Belgian Pro League	19	0	1	0	0	0	20	0
Gent	2026–27	Belgian Pro League	5	0	1	0	0	0	6	0
Gent	Total		37	1	2	0	0	0	39	1
Jong Gent	2024–25	Belgian Division 1	2	1	—		—		2	1
Career total			97	13	4	0	0	0	101	13
