= Jeffry Fortes =

Cape Verdean footballer (born 1989)

Personal information
- Date of birth: 22 March 1989 (age 37)
- Place of birth: Rotterdam, Netherlands
- Height: 1.83 m (6 ft 0 in)
- Positions: Right-back; defensive midfielder

Team information
- Current team: Den Bosch
- Number: 22

Youth career
- Neptunus
- SVV/SMC
- Dordrecht

Senior career*
Years	Team	Apps	(Gls)
2008–2009	Dordrecht	2	(0)
2009–2012	Den Bosch	0	(0)
2012–2016	Dordrecht	119	(11)
2016–2020	Excelsior	100	(11)
2020–2021	Sparta Rotterdam	21	(0)
2021–2025	De Graafschap	140	(12)
2025–	Den Bosch	32	(3)

International career^{‡}
2014–2022	Cape Verde	26	(0)
- * Club domestic league appearances and goals as of 25 April 2026 ‡ National team caps and goals as of 25 January 2022

Jeffry Fortes (born 22 March 1989) is a professional footballer who plays as a right-back for Eerste Divisie club Den Bosch. Born in the Netherlands, he plays for the Cape Verde national football team.

== Club career ==
Starting his career as a left-back, Fortes began his football career in the youth ranks of Neptunus and SVV/SMC, before moving on to Dordrecht for a season in professional football in 2008–09. He then spent three seasons at Den Bosch, without making any appearances, before returning to Dordrecht. During his second stint with the team, he helped secure promotion to the Eredivisie in the 2013–14 season, but suffered relegation in the following season.

On 19 May 2016, Fortes signed a two-year contract with Excelsior. In January 2020, he joined city rivals Sparta Rotterdam on a free transfer.

On 12 August 2021, Fortes signed a one-year contract with De Graafschap. He went on to establish himself as a regular starter, amassing over 150 appearances across all competitions during a four-year spell at the club. Fortes departed De Graafschap following the conclusion of the 2024–25 season.

On 5 August 2025, Fortes returned to Den Bosch on a one-season deal.

== International career ==
Fortes was born in the Netherlands to parents of Cape Verdean descent. He made his debut for the Cape Verde national football team in a 1–0 win over Mozambique. He was named in the roster for the 2021 Africa cup of nations when the team reached the round of 16.

== Honours ==
Individual

- Eerste Divisie Team of the Year: 2022–23
