= Sigurd Hauso Haugen =

Norwegian footballer (born 1997)

Sigurd Haugen
Personal information
- Full name: Sigurd Hauso Haugen
- Date of birth: 17 July 1997 (age 29)
- Place of birth: Haugesund, Norway
- Height: 1.87 m (6 ft 2 in)
- Position: Forward

Team information
- Current team: 1. FC Nürnberg
- Number: 9

Youth career
- 2003–2007: Haugar
- 2007–2013: Djerv 1919
- 2014–2015: Sandnes Ulf
- 2016: Odd

Senior career*
Years	Team	Apps	(Gls)
2013–2014	Haugesund 2	14	(6)
2014–2015	Sandnes Ulf 2	26	(23)
2016–2017	Odd	18	(3)
2018–2019	Sogndal	41	(25)
2019–2020	Union SG	21	(3)
2020–2022	Aalesund	68	(32)
2022–2025	AGF	33	(2)
2023–2024	→ NAC Breda (loan)	27	(6)
2024–2025	→ Hansa Rostock (loan)	32	(10)
2025–2026	1860 Munich	35	(16)
2026–	1. FC Nürnberg	6	(0)

International career
2015	Norway U18	5	(1)
2016	Norway U19	2	(0)
- * Club domestic league appearances and goals as of 29 October 2026

Sigurd Hauso Haugen (born 17 July 1997) is a Norwegian professional footballer who plays as a forward for German 2. Bundesliga club 1. FC Nürnberg.

== Career ==
On 7 July 2022, Haugen signed a five-year contract with Danish Superliga club Aarhus GF. He made his competitive debut on 17 July, playing the full game as AGF lost 1–0 to Brøndby on the opening matchday of the 2022–23. On 24 July, he scored his first goal for the club in a 3–1 win at home against Viborg, as he also provided an assist.

On 23 August 2023, Haugen joined NAC Breda in the Netherlands on loan with an option to buy.

On 2 September 2024, newly-relegated 3. Liga side Hansa Rostock confirmed that Haugen joined the club on a loan deal until the end of the 2024–25 season. Following the loan spell, there were talks between the clubs about making the move permanent, but the transfer ultimately fell through and Haugen returned to AGF.

On 5 July 2025, Haugen returned to 3. Liga and signed with TSV 1860 Munich.

On 30 June 2026, Haugen signed for 2. Bundesliga club 1. FC Nürnberg.

== Personal life ==
In December 2022, a news media revealed that Haugen had been arrested by the police in Aarhus after getting into an argument with a doorman in front of a disco. However, Haugen was not charged and was released the following day.

== Career statistics ==
As of match played 19 October 2025

Appearances and goals by club, season and competition
Club	Season	League			National cup		Europe		Other		Total	
Club	Season	Division	Apps	Goals	Apps	Goals	Apps	Goals	Apps	Goals	Apps	Goals
Odd	2016	Tippeligaen	3	1	0	0	1 (Note: Appearances in UEFA Europa League)	0	—		4	1
Odd	2017	Eliteserien	15	2	2	1	3	1	—		20	4
Odd	Total		18	3	2	1	4	1	—		24	5
Sogndal	2018	OBOS-ligaen	25	15	2	1	—		—		27	16
Sogndal	2019	OBOS-ligaen	16	10	2	1	—		—		18	11
Sogndal	Total		41	25	4	2	—		—		45	27
Union SG	2019–20	Proximus League	21	3	2	0	—		—		23	3
Aalesund	2020	Eliteserien	25	4	0	0	—		—		25	4
Aalesund	2021	OBOS-ligaen	30	21	3	2	—		—		33	23
Aalesund	2022	Eliteserien	13	7	2	1	—		—		15	8
Aalesund	Total		68	32	5	3	—		—		73	35
AGF	2022–23	Danish Superliga	31	2	3	4	—		—		34	6
AGF	2024–25	Danish Superliga	2	0	0	0	—		—		2	0
AGF	Total		33	2	3	4	—		—		36	6
NAC Breda (loan)	2023–24	Eerste Divisie	27	6	1	0	—		5 (Note: Appearances in Eredivisie play-offs)	4	28	6
Hansa Rostock (loan)	2024–25	3. Liga	32	10	0	0	—		—		32	10
1860 Munich	2025–26	3. Liga	11	5	0	0	—		—		11	5
Career total			251	86	17	10	4	1	5	4	277	101
