= Dominik Janošek =

Czech footballer (born 1998)

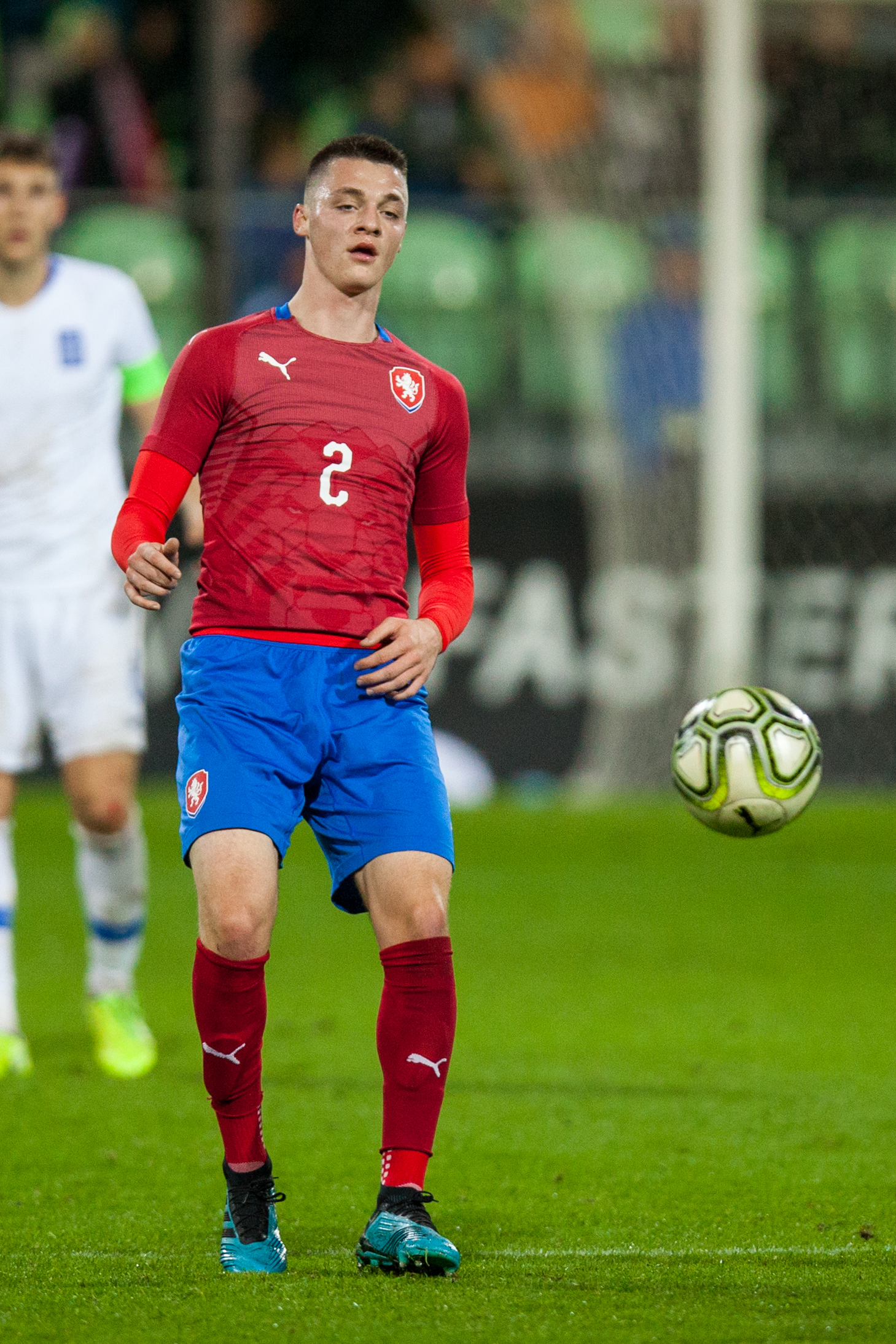
- Janošek with the Czech Republic in 2019

Personal information
- Date of birth: 13 June 1998 (age 28)
- Place of birth: Brno, Czech Republic
- Height: 1.83 m (6 ft 0 in)
- Position: Midfielder

Team information
- Current team: Sigma Olomouc
- Number: 39

Youth career
- 2004–2014: RAFK Rajhrad
- 2014–2017: Zbrojovka Brno

Senior career*
Years	Team	Apps	(Gls)
2017	Zbrojovka Brno	4	(0)
2018	Slovácko	10	(0)
2018–2022	Viktoria Plzeň	10	(0)
2018–2019	→ Slovácko (loan)	25	(2)
2020–2021	→ Mladá Boleslav (loan)	25	(0)
2021	→ Fastav Zlín (loan)	4	(0)
2022–2023	Pardubice	34	(8)
2023–2025	NAC Breda	66	(13)
2025–	Sigma Olomouc	20	(2)

International career
2016	Czech Republic U19	1	(0)
2017–2018	Czech Republic U20	8	(1)
2018–2021	Czech Republic U21	16	(2)
- * Club domestic league appearances and goals as of 27 May 2026

Dominik Janošek (born 13 June 1998) is a Czech professional footballer who plays for Sigma Olomouc.

== Club career ==
Janošek made his professional debut for Zbrojovka Brno in the home match against Slovácko on 14 October 2017, which ended in a 2–1 win.

In June 2023, Janošek signed for Eerste Divisie club NAC Breda on a two-year contract with the option for a further year.

On 26 June 2025, Janošek signed a two-year contract with Sigma Olomouc as a free agent.
