= Martin Koscelník =

Slovak footballer (born 1995)

Personal information
- Date of birth: 2 March 1995 (age 31)
- Place of birth: Vranov nad Topľou, Slovakia
- Height: 1.79 m (5 ft 10 in)
- Position: Right-back

Team information
- Current team: Zemplín Michalovce

Youth career
- –2010: Futura Humenné
- 2010–2014: Zemplín Michalovce

Senior career*
Years	Team	Apps	(Gls)
2015–2018	Zemplín Michalovce	114	(20)
2018–2022	Slovan Liberec	97	(3)
2022–2023	Rapid Vienna	20	(0)
2023–2024	NAC Breda	30	(4)
2025–2026	Slovácko	37	(3)
2026-	Zemplín Michalovce	1	(0)

International career^{‡}
2020–2022	Slovakia	14	(1)
- * Club domestic league appearances and goals as of 31 August 2026 ‡ National team caps and goals as of 16 July 2025

Martin Koscelník (born 2 March 1995) is a Slovak professional footballer who plays as a right-back for Slovak club Zemplín Michalovce, and the Slovakia national team.

== Club career ==
Koscelník made his Slovak Super Liga debut for Zemplín Michalovce against AS Trenčín in the first match of the 2015–16 season, starting the match but being replaced in the second half by Martin Regáli. He played 87 matches in Slovakia's First League, scoring 15 times, before signing for Czech side Slovan Liberec under Slovak head coach Zsolt Hornyák in June 2018. During his time at Slovan Liberec, Koscelník played in the UEFA Europa League as well as making 96 appearances in the Czech First League for the club, in which he scored three goals. He became the ninth player to leave Liberec after the conclusion of the 2021–22 season, signing for Austrian side Rapid Vienna.

On 29 August 2023, Koscelník joined NAC Breda in the Netherlands on a free transfer, signing a two-year contract. Koscelník made news after the club's promotion to the Eredivisie in 2024, swimming in the Breda harbour and climbing a lamppost. He played in 36 games across all competitions for Breda, but towards the end of his time at the club, found his playing opportunities limited, with just three appearances in the 2024–25 season.

On 29 January 2025, Koscelník signed a two-year contract with Slovácko.

== International career ==
On 25 August 2020, Koscelník received his first call-up to the Slovak senior squad by coach Pavel Hapal for the Nations League matches against Czech Republic and Israel. The same year on 4 September, he made his debut in a 2020–21 UEFA Nations League match against neighbours the Czech Republic.

On 7 September 2021, Koscelník scored his first international goal in a 2022 FIFA World Cup qualifier against Cyprus, ending in a 2–0 victory for the Slovaks.

== Career statistics ==
As of match played on 29 March 2022. Scores and results list Slovakia's goal tally first.

No.	Date	Venue	Cap	Opponent	Score	Result	Competition
1.	7 September 2021	Tehelné pole, Bratislava, Slovakia	10	Cyprus	2–0	2–0	2022 FIFA World Cup qualification
