= Roy Kuijpers =

Dutch footballer (born 2000)

Personal information
- Date of birth: 17 January 2000 (age 26)
- Place of birth: Zwolle, Netherlands
- Height: 1.75 m (5 ft 9 in)
- Position: Forward

Team information
- Current team: RKC Waalwijk
- Number: 17

Youth career
- 2008–2019: FC Den Bosch

Senior career*
Years	Team	Apps	(Gls)
2019–2021	Vitesse	0	(0)
2021	→ FC Den Bosch (loan)	13	(2)
2021	FC Den Bosch	17	(9)
2021–2023	RKC Waalwijk	28	(2)
2023–2025	NAC Breda	37	(3)
2025–	RKC Waalwijk	22	(3)
- * Club domestic league appearances and goals as of 7 March 2026

Roy Kuijpers (born 17 January 2000) is a Dutch professional footballer who plays as a forward for Eerste Divisie club RKC Waalwijk.

== Early life ==
Kuijpers was born in Zwolle, where his father ran a company, but the family returned to Brabant at a young age, settling in Son en Breugel.

== Career ==
A youth product of FC Den Bosch, Kuijpers signed with Vitesse in 2019. He returned to Den Bosch on loan on 2 January 2021. He made his professional debut with FC Den Bosch in a 2–1 Eerste Divisie win over Jong AZ on 11 January 2021.

In the summer of 2021, Kuijpers began playing for FC Den Bosch on an amateur contract. He scored nine goals in 17 league games during the first half of the 2021–22 season. The club offered him a professional deal twice, but on 3 December 2021 it was announced that Kuijpers signed with Eredivisie club RKC Waalwijk on a contract until July 2025. He made his debut on 5 December, coming on as a substitute in the second half before scoring the 2–1 winner in injury time against NEC, after an assist by Finn Stokkers.

On 15 August 2023, Kuijpers signed a two-year contract with NAC Breda.

On 7 July 2025, Kuijpers returned to RKC Waalwijk on a two-season deal.
