= 2020–21 Willem II season =

Willem II
2020–21 season
- Chairman: Jack Buckens
- Manager: Adrie Koster
- Stadium: Koning Willem II Stadion
- Eredivisie: 14th
- KNVB Cup: Second round
- UEFA Europa League: Third qualifying round
- Top goalscorer: League: Vangelis Pavlidis (10); All: Vangelis Pavlidis (12)
Home colours	Away colours	Third colours

The 2020–21 Willem II season was the club's 125th season in existence and the club's 7th consecutive season in the top flight of Dutch football. In addition to the domestic league, Willem II participated in this season's editions of the KNVB Cup and the UEFA Europa League. The season covered the period from 1 July 2020 to 30 June 2021.

== Players ==
=== First-team squad ===
As of 1 February 2021

Note: Flags indicate national team as defined under FIFA eligibility rules; some limited exceptions apply. Players may hold more than one non-FIFA nationality.

No.	Pos.	Nation	Player
1	GK	NED	Robbin Ruiter
3	DF	NED	Freek Heerkens (2nd captain)
4	DF	NED	Jordens Peters (captain)
5	DF	NED	Ian Smeulers (on loan from Feyenoord)
6	DF	NED	Jan-Arie van der Heijden
7	FW	NED	Ché Nunnely
8	MF	ESP	Pol Llonch
10	FW	GRE	Vangelis Pavlidis
11	FW	GER	Mats Köhlert
13	DF	NED	Leeroy Owusu
14	FW	BEL	Elton Kabangu
15	FW	NED	Ole Romeny (on loan from NEC)
16	MF	NED	Rick Zuijderwijk
17	MF	MAR	Dries Saddiki
18	DF	SUR	Miquel Nelom

No.	Pos.	Nation	Player
20	FW	GHA	Kwasi Okyere Wriedt
21	MF	BEL	Mike Trésor
22	DF	NED	Victor van den Bogert
23	MF	GER	Görkem Sağlam
24	GK	NED	Connor van den Berg
25	DF	SWE	Sebastian Holmén
26	GK	BEL	Jorn Brondeel
27	DF	GER	Derrick Köhn
30	MF	ALB	Lindon Selahi (on loan from Twente)
32	DF	NED	Sven van Beek (on loan from Feyenoord)
43	MF	NED	Wesley Spieringhs
46	DF	NED	Jop van den Avert
48	DF	NED	Vincent Schippers
49	GK	KOS	Arijanet Murić (on loan from Manchester City)

=== Out on loan ===
Note: Flags indicate national team as defined under FIFA eligibility rules; some limited exceptions apply. Players may hold more than one non-FIFA nationality.

No. / Pos. / Nation / Player; 12 / DF / AUS / Dylan Ryan (at Melbourne Victory until 30 June 2021)	No. / Pos. / Nation / Player; 19 / MF / GER / John Yeboah (at Almere City until 30 June 2021)

== Transfers ==
=== In ===
No.	Pos	Player	Transferred from	Fee	Date	Source
15			TBD		1 July 2020	

=== Out ===
No.	Pos	Player	Transferred to	Fee	Date	Source
15			TBD		1 July 2020	

== Pre-season and friendlies ==
Win Draw Loss

14 August 2020 Friendly	Willem II (Netherlands)	2–1	(Netherlands) VVV-Venlo	Tilburg, Netherlands
18:45 CEST (UTC+2)	Wriedt 55'; Ndayishimiye 65' (pen.)	Report	Linthorst 10'	Stadium: Koning Willem II Stadion; Attendance: 2,800

21 August 2020 Friendly	Willem II (Netherlands)	1–1	(Netherlands) PSV	Tilburg, Netherlands
18:45 CEST (UTC+2)	Llonch (yellow card) 30'; Pavlidis 76'	Report	Malen 16'; Rosario (yellow card) 40'	Stadium: Koning Willem II Stadion

4 September 2020 Friendly	Genk (Belgium)	Cancelled	(Netherlands) Willem II	Belgium
14:00 CEST (UTC+2)

== Competitions ==
=== Overview ===
Competition	First match	Last match	Starting round	Final position	Record							
Competition	First match	Last match	Starting round	Final position	Pld	W	D	L	GF	GA	GD	Win %
Eredivisie	12 September 2020	16 May 2021	Matchday 1	14th	34	8	7	19	40	68	−28	23.53
KNVB Cup	2 December 2020	17 December 2020	First round	Second round	1	0	0	1	0	2	−2	0.00
UEFA Europa League	16 September 2020	24 September 2020	Second qualifying round	Third qualifying round	2	1	0	1	5	4	+1	50.00
Total					37	9	7	21	45	74	−29	24.32

Last updated: 16 May 2021
Source: Soccerway

=== Eredivisie ===
==== League table ====
Pos	Team	Pld	W	D	L	GF	GA	GD	Pts	Qualification or relegation
12	Heerenveen	34	9	12	13	43	49	−6	39	
13	PEC Zwolle	34	9	11	14	44	53	−9	38	
14	Willem II	34	8	7	19	40	68	−28	31	
15	RKC Waalwijk	34	7	9	18	33	55	−22	30	
16	Emmen (R)	34	7	9	18	40	68	−28	30	Qualification for the Relegation play-offs (Note: Seven teams, one from the Eredivisie and six from the Eerste Divisie, play for one spot in the 2021–22 Eredivisie. The remaining six teams play in the 2021–22 Eerste Divisie.)

Source: Eredivisie, Soccerway
Rules for classification: Season in progress: 1) Most points won; 2) Less points lost; 3) Goal difference; 4) Goals scored; 5) Alphabetical order; End of season: 1) Points; 2) Goal difference; 3) Goals scored; 4) Head-to-head points; 5) Head-to-head goal difference; 6) Head-to-head away goals scored; 7) Play-off if relevant for deciding champion, relegation or participating in a European league, otherwise by draw. 8) Penalty shoot-out (only after a play-off)
(R) Relegated

==== Results summary ====
Overall								Home						Away					
Pld	W	D	L	GF	GA	GD	Pts	W	D	L	GF	GA	GD	W	D	L	GF	GA	GD
34	8	7	19	40	68	−28	31	6	2	9	22	33	−11	2	5	10	18	35	−17

Last updated: 16 May 2021.
Source: Eredivisie

==== Results by round ====
Round	1	2	3	4	5	6	7	8	9	10	11	12	13	14	15	16	17	18	19	20	21	22	23	24	25	26	27	28	29	30	31	32	33	34
Ground	A	H	A	H	H	A	H	A	H	A	A	H	A	H	A	H	A	H	A	H	H	A	H	A	A	H	A	H	A	H	A	H	A	H
Result	L	W	D	L	L	D	L	L	W	L	L	L	L	D	L	L	D	L	L	W	D	L	L	W	D	W	D	L	L	W	L	L	W	W
Position	18	8	8	11	12	11	12	14	12	14	15	16	16	15	16	17	16	17	17	16	16	16	16	16	16	16	15	15	15	15	15	15	15	14

Updated to match(es) played on 16 May 2021. Source: Eredivisie
A = Away; H = Home; W = Win; D = Draw; L = Loss

==== Matches ====
The league fixtures were announced on 24 July 2020.

12 September 2020 1	SC Heerenveen	2–0	Willem II	Heerenveen
18:45 CEST (UTC+2)	Batista Meier (yellow card) 17'; Woudenberg 22'; Van der Heide (yellow card) 68'; Bochniewicz 75'	Report	Llonch (yellow card) 19'; Nelom (yellow card) 32'; Sağlam (yellow card) 44'	Stadium: Abe Lenstra Stadion; Attendance: 4,000; Referee: Richard Martens

20 September 2020 2	Willem II	4–0	Heracles Almelo	Tilburg
14:30 CEST (UTC+2)	Köhlert (yellow card) 43'; Pavlidis 46', 84'; Sağlam 50'; Yeboah 52'	Report		Stadium: Koning Willem II Stadion; Attendance: 3,908; Referee: Jeroen Manschot

27 September 2020 3	FC Emmen	1–1	Willem II	Emmen
16:45 CEST (UTC+2)	De Leeuw 5'; Bijl (yellow card) 19', (red card) 57'	Report	Trésor 13'; Holmén (yellow card) 90+2'	Stadium: De Oude Meerdijk; Attendance: 2,312; Referee: Edwin van de Graaf

4 October 2020 4	Willem II	1–4	Feyenoord	Tilburg
14:30 CEST (UTC+2)	Peters (yellow card) 8'; Pavlidis 13'	Report	Haps 23'; Linssen 48'; Berghuis 56', 77'; Spajić (yellow card) 88'	Stadium: Koning Willem II Stadion; Attendance: 0 Referee: Allard Lindhout

17 October 2020 5	Willem II	0–3	FC Twente	Tilburg
20:00 CEST (UTC+2)	Holmén (yellow card) 45+2'; Sağlam (yellow card) 64'; Nelom (yellow card) 70'	Report	Danilo 2', 62'; Oosterwolde 48'; Lamprou (yellow card) 83'	Stadium: Koning Willem II Stadion; Attendance: 0 Referee: Dennis Higler

24 October 2020 6	PEC Zwolle	0–0	Willem II	Zwolle
20:00 CEST (UTC+2)	Leemans (yellow card) 47'; Saymak (yellow card) 84' (yellow-red card) 85'	Report	Trésor (yellow card) 48'	Stadium: MAC³PARK Stadion; Referee: Martín Pérez

31 October 2020 7	Willem II	1–3	Vitesse	Tilburg
21:00 CET (UTC+1)	Nunnely 25'	Report	Openda 57'; Broja 63'; Vroegh 85'	Stadium: Koning Willem II Stadion; Attendance: 0 Referee: Marc Nagtegaal

8 November 2020 8	PSV	3–0	Willem II	Eindhoven
20:00 CET (UTC+1)	Max 14'; Götze 21'; Rosario (yellow card) 40'; Malen 82'	Report	Köhn (red card) 63'	Stadium: Philips Stadion; Attendance: 0 Referee: Allard Lindhout

21 November 2020 9	Willem II	2–1	VVV-Venlo	Tilburg
18:45 CET (UTC+1)	Pavlidis 7'; Sağlam 18'; Llonch (yellow card) 62'; Trésor (yellow card) 86'	Report	Giakoumakis 34'; Hunte (yellow card) 73'	Stadium: Koning Willem II Stadion; Attendance: 0 Referee: Erwin Blank

29 November 2020 10	FC Groningen	1–0	Willem II	Groningen
14:30 CET (UTC+1)	El Messaoudi 63'	Report	Sağlam (yellow card) 45+1'	Stadium: Hitachi Capital Mobility Stadion; Attendance: 0 Referee: Martin van den Kerkhof

5 December 2020 11	Fortuna Sittard	3–2	Willem II	Sittard
18:45 CET (UTC+1)	Semedo 9'; Polter 29' (pen.); Rota (yellow card) 33'; Flemming 44'	Report	Köhn (yellow card) 50'; Pavlidis (yellow card) 61', (goal) 66'; Heerkens (yellow card) 63'; Llonch (yellow card) 75' (yellow-red card) 88'; Van der Heijden 87'	Stadium: Fortuna Sittard Stadion; Attendance: 0 Referee: Kevin Blom

13 December 2020 12	Willem II	1–3	Sparta Rotterdam	Tilburg
14:30 CET (UTC+1)	Sağlam (yellow card) 12'; Köhn (yellow card) 19'; Holmén (yellow card) 52'; Wriedt 90+3'	Report	Thy 6'; D. Duarte 45+1', 51'; Vriends (yellow card) 59'	Stadium: Koning Willem II Stadion; Attendance: 0 Referee: Christiaan Bax

20 December 2020 13	AZ	5–3	Willem II	Alkmaar
16:45 CET (UTC+1)	Koopmeiners 38', 43'; Stengs 53'; Midtsjø 65'; Karlsson 69' (pen.)	Report	Aboukhlal 22' (o.g.); Trésor 36' (pen.); Köhn (yellow card) 68'; Nunnely 90'	Stadium: AFAS Stadion; Attendance: 0 Referee: Dennis Higler

23 December 2020 14	Willem II	1–1	Ajax	Tilburg
18:45 CET (UTC+1)	Wriedt 54'	Report	Antony 4', (yellow card) 66'	Stadium: Koning Willem II Stadion; Attendance: 0 Referee: Jeroen Manschot

10 January 2021 15	VVV-Venlo	2–1	Willem II	Venlo
14:30 CET (UTC+1)	Giakoumakis 79' (pen.), 90+3', (yellow card) 87'	Report	Van der Heijden 15', (yellow card) 52'; Holmén (yellow card) 66'	Stadium: De Koel; Attendance: 0 Referee: Jochem Kamphuis

14 January 2021 16	Willem II	2–3	FC Groningen	Tilburg
21:00 CET (UTC+1)	Nunnely 60'; Dammers 79' (o.g.)	Report	El Hankouri 50', 90+3'; Itakura 84', (yellow card) 90+2'	Stadium: Koning Willem II Stadion; Attendance: 0 Referee: Marc Nagtegaal

17 January 2021 17	RKC Waalwijk	1–1	Willem II	Waalwijk
12:15 CET (UTC+1)	Tahiri 47'	Report	Wriedt 59'	Stadium: Mandemakers Stadion; Attendance: 0 Referee: Allard Lindhout

22 January 2021 18	Willem II	1–3	PEC Zwolle	Tilburg
20:00 CET (UTC+1)	Wriedt 10', (red card) 45+1'; Selahi (yellow card) 41'	Report	Kersten (yellow card) 45'; Ghoochannejhad 58', 62', 70' (pen.)	Stadium: Koning Willem II Stadion; Attendance: 0 Referee: Sander van der Eijk

28 January 2021 19	Ajax	3–1	Willem II	Amsterdam
21:00 CET (UTC+1)	Klaassen 51'; Brobbey 83'; Tadić 87'; Schuurs (yellow card) 89'; Blind (yellow card) 90+2'	Report	Pavlidis 62'	Stadium: Johan Cruyff Arena; Attendance: 0 Referee: Siemen Mulder

31 January 2021 20	Willem II	2–0	FC Emmen	Tilburg
14:30 CET (UTC+1)	Nunnely 38'; Wriedt 47'	Report	Bijl (yellow card) 90'	Stadium: Koning Willem II Stadion; Attendance: 0 Referee: Björn Kuipers

14 February 2021 22	Feyenoord	5–0	Willem II	Rotterdam
14:30 CET (UTC+1)	Diemers (yellow card) 6'; Toornstra 45+2'; Linssen 49'; Sinisterra 52'; Berghuis 63' (pen.); Kökçü 83'	Report	Trésor (yellow card) 90'	Stadium: De Kuip; Attendance: 0 Referee: Jochem Kamphuis

19 February 2021 23	Willem II	0–6	FC Utrecht	Tilburg
20:00 CET (UTC+1)	Selahi (yellow card) 77'	Report	Ter Avest 3'; Van de Streek 11', 19'; Ramselaar 47'; Kerk 69'; Van der Maarel 86'	Stadium: Koning Willem II Stadion; Attendance: 0 Referee: Rob Dieperink

24 February 2021 21	Willem II	1–1	ADO Den Haag	Tilburg
16:30 CET (UTC+1)	Heerkens (yellow card) 37'; Trésor 48' (pen.); Peters (yellow card) 60' (yellow-red card) 75'; Owusu (yellow card) 90+6'	Report	Gomelt (red card) 42'; Pinas 62' (pen.)	Stadium: Koning Willem II Stadion; Attendance: 0 Referee: Siemen Mulder

28 February 2021 24	Sparta Rotterdam	0–2	Willem II	Rotterdam
12:15 CET (UTC+1)	Duarte (yellow card) 43'; Fortes (red card) 78'	Report	Nunnely 67'; Trésor 78' (pen.)	Stadium: Het Kasteel; Attendance: 0 Referee: Kevin Blom

6 March 2021 25	FC Twente	1–1	Willem II	Enschede
18:45 CET (UTC+1)	Roemeratoe (yellow card) 40'; Bosch 64', (yellow card) 89'	Report	Pavlidis 81'	Stadium: De Grolsch Veste; Attendance: 0 Referee: Serdar Gözübüyük

13 March 2021 26	Willem II	3–1	SC Heerenveen	Tilburg
16:30 CET (UTC+1)	Holmén 28'; Wriedt 55'; Nunnely 58'	Report	J. Veerman (yellow card) 59', (goal) 73'	Stadium: Koning Willem II Stadion; Attendance: 0 Referee: Jeroen Manschot

21 March 2021 27	Vitesse	0–0	Willem II	Arnhem
14:30 CET (UTC+1)	Rasmussen (yellow card) 20'; Tannane (yellow card) 54'	Report	Spieringhs (yellow card) 24'	Stadium: GelreDome; Attendance: 0 Referee: Danny Makkelie

3 April 2021 28	Willem II	0–1	AZ	Tilburg
20:00 CEST (UTC+2)	Llonch (yellow card) 37'; Saddiki (yellow card) 74'	Report	Koopmeiners (red card) 5'; Guðmundsson 72'; Midtsjø (yellow card) 77'	Stadium: Koning Willem II Stadion; Attendance: 0 Referee: Kevin Blom

10 April 2021 29	Heracles Almelo	4–0	Willem II	Almelo
18:45 CEST (UTC+2)	Bakış 6', 38'; Pröpper 46'; Vloet 77'	Report	Owusu (yellow card) 80'	Stadium: Erve Asito; Attendance: 0 Referee: Pol van Boekel

23 April 2021 30	Willem II	1–0	RKC Waalwijk	Tilburg
20:00 CEST (UTC+2)	Pavlidis 54', (yellow card) 90+5'	Report	Anita (yellow card) 61'	Stadium: Koning Willem II Stadion; Attendance: 2,000; Referee: Danny Makkelie

1 May 2021 31	FC Utrecht	3–2	Willem II	Utrecht
21:00 CEST (UTC+2)	Van de Streek 4'; Maher (yellow card) 33'; Van Beek 45+4' (o.g.); Kerk 68'; Gustafson (yellow card) 90+2'	Report	Holmén (yellow card) 34', (goal) 57'; Wriedt (yellow card) 37', (goal) 82'	Stadium: Stadion Galgenwaard; Attendance: 0 Referee: Jeroen Manschot

9 May 2021 32	Willem II	0–2	PSV	Tilburg
16:45 CEST (UTC+2)		Report	Malen 26'; Köhn 51' (o.g.); Dumfries (yellow card) 82'	Stadium: Koning Willem II Stadion; Attendance: 0 Referee: Dennis Higler

13 May 2021 33	ADO Den Haag	1–4	Willem II	The Hague
14:30 CEST (UTC+2)	El Khayati (penalty missed) 38'; Van Ewijk (yellow card) 45+4'; Kramer 69'; Vejinović (yellow card) 88'	Report	Pavlidis 5', 22'; Wriedt 40'; Nunnely 71'; Selahi (yellow card) 73'; Muric (yellow card) 75'	Stadium: Cars Jeans Stadion; Attendance: 0 Referee: Jochem Kamphuis

16 May 2021 34	Willem II	2–1	Fortuna Sittard	Tilburg
14:30 CEST (UTC+2)	Llonch (yellow card) 39'; Pavlidis 45', (yellow card) 57'; Holmén 67'	Report	Flemming (yellow card) 45+2', (goal) 48'	Stadium: Koning Willem II Stadion; Attendance: 0 Referee: Allard Lindhout

=== KNVB Cup ===
2 December 2020 First round	DVS '33	Bye	Willem II	Ermelo
19:45 CET (UTC+1)				Stadium: Sportpark Zuid

17 December 2020 Second round	Willem II	0–2	Vitesse	Tilburg
21:00 CET (UTC+1)	Holmén (yellow card) 41'; Schippers (yellow card) 84'	Report	Manhoef 20'; Buitink 63'	Stadium: Koning Willem II Stadion; Attendance: 0 Referee: Sander van der Eijk

=== UEFA Europa League ===
16 September 2020 Second qualifying round	Progrès Niederkorn (Luxembourg)	0–5	(Netherlands) Willem II	Differdange, Luxembourg
18:30 CEST (UTC+2)	Jänisch (yellow card) 10'; Ferino (yellow card) 68'	Report	Pavlidis 20', 34'; Sağlam 28'; Nunnely 46'; Trésor 65'	Stadium: Stade Municipal; Attendance: 0 Referee: Mykola Balakin (Ukraine)

24 September 2020 Third qualifying round	Willem II (Netherlands)	0–4	(Scotland) Rangers	Tilburg, Netherlands
21:00 CEST (UTC+2)	Nelom (yellow card) 27'; Pavlidis (yellow card) 81'; Llonch (yellow card) 82'	Report	Barišić (yellow card) 6'; Tavernier 22' (pen.); Kent 25'; Helander 55', 71'; Morelos (yellow card) 66'	Stadium: Koning Willem II Stadion; Attendance: 0 Referee: Maurizio Mariani (Italy)
