= 2019–20 Willem II season =

124th season of Dutch football team

Willem II
2019–20 season
- Chairman: Jack Buckens
- Head coach: Adrie Koster
- Stadium: Koning Willem II Stadion
- Eredivisie: 5th
- KNVB Cup: Round of 16
- Top goalscorer: League: Vangelis Pavlidis (11); All: Vangelis Pavlidis (13)
Home colours	Away colours

The 2019–20 season was Willem II's 124th season in existence and the club's 6th consecutive season in the top flight of Dutch football. It covers a period from 1 July 2019 to 30 June 2020. They participated in the Eredivisie and the KNVB Cup.

== Players ==
=== First-team squad ===
As of 26 September 2019

Note: Flags indicate national team as defined under FIFA eligibility rules; some limited exceptions apply. Players may hold more than one non-FIFA nationality.

No.	Pos.	Nation	Player
1	GK	GER	Timon Wellenreuther
2	DF	NED	Fernando Lewis
3	DF	NED	Freek Heerkens (2nd captain)
4	DF	NED	Jordens Peters (captain)
7	FW	NED	Ché Nunnely
8	MF	ESP	Pol Llonch
9	FW	NED	Paul Gladon
10	FW	GRE	Vangelis Pavlidis
11	FW	GER	Mats Köhlert
12	GK	NZL	Michael Woud
13	GK	GRE	Giorgos Strezos
14	FW	BEL	Elton Kabangu
15	DF	NED	Damil Dankerlui
16	FW	GRE	Marios Vrousai (on loan from Olympiacos)

No.	Pos.	Nation	Player
17	MF	NED	Dries Saddiki
18	DF	NED	Miquel Nelom
20	FW	FRA	Karim Coulibaly
21	FW	BEL	Mike Trésor (on loan from NEC)
22	DF	POR	João Queirós (on loan from FC Köln)
24	DF	NZL	James McGarry
25	DF	SWE	Sebastian Holmén
26	DF	NED	Bart Nieuwkoop (on loan from Feyenoord)
27	DF	NED	Victor van den Bogert
28	MF	ECU	Jhonny Quiñónez
29	DF	CUW	Justin Ogenia
32	DF	AUS	Dylan Ryan
33	MF	NED	Rick Zuijderwijk

=== Out on loan ===
Note: Flags indicate national team as defined under FIFA eligibility rules; some limited exceptions apply. Players may hold more than one non-FIFA nationality.

No.	Pos.	Nation	Player
—	MF	GER	Atakan Akkaynak (at Caykur Rizespor until 30 June 2020)

== Pre-season and friendlies ==
Win Draw Loss

6 July 2019 Friendly	Willem II (Netherlands)	2–1	(Belgium) KV Oostende	Rijen, Netherlands
15:00 CEST (UTC+2)				Stadium: Sportpark Vijf Eiken

13 July 2019 Friendly	Willem II (Netherlands)	2–0	(Netherlands) TOP Oss	Oisterwijk, Netherlands
12:00 CEST (UTC+2)				Stadium: Sportpark Den Donk

17 July 2019 Friendly	Willem II (Netherlands)	0–3	(Netherlands) Sparta Rotterdam	Dongen, Netherlands
18:30 CEST (UTC+2)				Stadium: Sportpark De Biezen

20 July 2019 Friendly	Zulte Waregem (Belgium)	1–1	(Netherlands) Willem II	Waregem, Belgium
15:00 CEST (UTC+2)				Stadium: Regenboogstadion

27 July 2019 Friendly	Willem II (Netherlands)	2–1	(Greece) OFI	Tilburg, Netherlands
14:30 CEST (UTC+2)				Stadium: Koning Willem II Stadion

== Competitions ==
Win Draw Loss Fixtures

=== Overview ===
Competition	First match	Last match	Starting round	Final position	Record							
Competition	First match	Last match	Starting round	Final position	Pld	W	D	L	GF	GA	GD	Win %
Eredivisie	2 August 2019	24 May 2020	Matchday 1	5th	26	13	5	8	37	34	+3	50.00
KNVB Cup	30 October 2019	22 January 2020	First round	Round of 16	3	2	1	0	9	2	+7	66.67
Total					29	15	6	8	46	36	+10	51.72

Last updated: 8 March 2020
Source: Soccerway

=== Eredivisie ===
==== League table ====
Pos	Team	Pld	W	D	L	GF	GA	GD	Pts	Qualification or relegation
3	Feyenoord	25	14	8	3	50	35	+15	50	Qualification for the Europa League group stage
4	PSV Eindhoven	26	14	7	5	54	28	+26	49	Qualification for the Europa League third qualifying round
5	Willem II	26	13	5	8	37	34	+3	44	Qualification for the Europa League second qualifying round
6	FC Utrecht	25	12	5	8	50	34	+16	41	
7	Vitesse	26	12	5	9	45	35	+10	41	

Source: eredivisie.nl
Rules for classification: Season in progress: 1) Most points won; 2) Less points lost; 3) Goal difference; 4) Goals scored; 5) Alphabetical order; End of season: 1) Points; 2) Goal difference; 3) Goals scored; 4) Head-to-head points; 5) Head-to-head goal difference; 6) Head-to-head away goals scored; 7) Play-off if relevant for deciding champion, relegation or participating in a European league, otherwise by draw. 8) Penalty shoot-out (only after a play-off)

==== Results summary ====
Overall								Home						Away					
Pld	W	D	L	GF	GA	GD	Pts	W	D	L	GF	GA	GD	W	D	L	GF	GA	GD
26	13	5	8	37	34	+3	44	7	4	2	17	9	+8	6	1	6	20	25	−5

Last updated: 8 March 2020.
Source: Eredivisie

==== Results by round ====
Round	1	2	3	4	5	6	7	8	9	10	11	12	13	14	15	16	17	18	19	20	21	22	23	24	25	26	27	28	29	30	31	32	33	34
Ground	A	H	A	A	H	A	H	A	H	A	H	H	A	H	A	H	A	H	A	H	H	A	H	A	A	H	A	H	A	H	A	H	A	H
Result	W	L	W	W	L	L	W	L	D	W	W	L	W	D	W	W	W	D	W	D	W	L	D	L	W	L	C	C	C	C	C	C	C	C
Position	5	9	7	4	6	8	6	9	10	7	6	6	6	6	4	4	3	3	3	4	4	4	5	5	5	5	5	5	5	5	5	5	5	5

Updated to match(es) played on 8 March 2020. Source: Eredivisie
A = Away; H = Home; W = Win; D = Draw; L = Loss

==== Matches ====
The Eredivisie schedule was announced on 14 June 2019. The 2019–20 season was abandoned on 24 April 2020, due to the coronavirus pandemic in the Netherlands.

2 August 2019 1	PEC Zwolle	1–3	Willem II	Zwolle
20:00 CEST (UTC+2)		Report		Stadium: MAC³PARK Stadion; Attendance: 13,824; Referee: Jeroen Manschot

10 August 2019 2	Willem II	0–2	Vitesse	Tilburg
20:45 CEST (UTC+2)		Report		Stadium: Koning Willem II Stadion; Attendance: 12,825; Referee: Edwin van de Graaf

18 August 2019 3	Fortuna Sittard	2–3	Willem II	Sittard
12:15 CEST (UTC+2)		Report		Stadium: Fortuna Sittard Stadion; Attendance: 7,273; Referee: Allard Lindhout

24 August 2019 4	Willem II	2–1	Emmen	Tilburg
18:30 CEST (UTC+2)		Report		Stadium: Koning Willem II Stadion; Attendance: 13,300; Referee: Siemen Mulder

1 September 2019 5	Willem II	0–1	Feyenoord	Tilburg
16:45 CEST (UTC+2)		Report		Stadium: Koning Willem II Stadion; Attendance: 13,875; Referee: Bas Nijhuis

15 September 2019 6	Heracles Almelo	4–1	Willem II	Almelo
14:30 CEST (UTC+2)		Report		Stadium: Polman Stadion; Attendance: 11,254; Referee: Joey Kooij

21 September 2019 7	Willem II	1–0	VVV-Venlo	Tilburg
19:45 CEST (UTC+2)		Report		Stadium: Koning Willem II Stadion; Attendance: 13,227; Referee: Rob Dieperink

29 September 2019 8	Utrecht	2–0	Willem II	Utrecht
14:30 CEST (UTC+2)		Report		Stadium: Stadion Galgenwaard; Attendance: 19,419; Referee: Edwin van de Graaf

6 October 2019 9	Willem II	1–1	AZ	Tilburg
16:45 CEST (UTC+2)	Köhlert 31'	Report	Koopmeiners 22'	Stadium: Koning Willem II Stadion; Attendance: 12,707; Referee: Dennis Higler

19 October 2019 10	Twente	0–1	Willem II	Enschede
19:45 CEST (UTC+2)		Report		Stadium: De Grolsch Veste; Attendance: 27,500; Referee: Martin van den Kerkhof

26 October 2019 11	Willem II	2–1	RKC Waalwijk	Tilburg
18:30 CEST (UTC+2)		Report		Stadium: Koning Willem II Stadion; Attendance: 13,877; Referee: Kevin Blom

3 November 2019 12	Groningen	2–0	Willem II	Groningen
14:30 CET (UTC+1)		Report		Stadium: Euroborg; Attendance: 16,590; Referee: Pol van Boekel

10 November 2019 13	Willem II	2–1	PSV	Tilburg
14:30 CET (UTC+1)	Nunnely 7', 64'; Heerkens (yellow card) 30'	Report	Gutiérrez (yellow card) 66'; Mitroglou (yellow card) 67'; Pereiro (yellow card) 70', (goal) 85'; Doan (yellow card) 73'; Viergever (yellow card) 90'	Stadium: Koning Willem II Stadion; Attendance: 14,400; Referee: Björn Kuipers

23 November 2019 14	ADO Den Haag	3–3	Willem II	The Hague
20:45 CET (UTC+1)		Report		Stadium: Cars Jeans Stadion; Attendance: 10,889; Referee: Allard Lindhout

30 November 2019 15	Willem II	4–0	Sparta Rotterdam	Tilburg
18:30 CET (UTC+1)		Report		Stadium: Koning Willem II Stadion; Attendance: 14,250; Referee: Siemen Mulder

6 December 2019 16	Ajax	0–2	Willem II	Amsterdam
20:15 CET (UTC+1)	Dest (yellow card) 40'	Report	Llonch (yellow card) 3'; Trésor 42' (pen.); Dankerlui 78'	Stadium: Johan Cruyff Arena; Attendance: 54,022; Referee: Björn Kuipers

13 December 2019 17	Heerenveen	1–2	Willem II	Heerenveen
20:00 CET (UTC+1)		Report		Stadium: Abe Lenstra Stadion; Attendance: 18,121; Referee: Dennis Higler

21 December 2019 18	Willem II	0–0	Fortuna Sittard	Tilburg
20:45 CET (UTC+1)		Report		Stadium: Koning Willem II Stadion; Attendance: 13,587; Referee: Bas Nijhuis

18 January 2020 19	AZ	1–3	Willem II	Alkmaar
20:45 CET (UTC+1)	Wuytens (yellow card) 11'; Idrissi 27'; Wijndal (yellow card) 71'	Report	Peters (yellow card) 56'; Köhlert 65'; Pavlidis 78'; Trésor 83'	Stadium: AFAS Stadion; Attendance: 15,442; Referee: Björn Kuipers

26 January 2020 20	Willem II	0–0	PEC Zwolle	Tilburg
14:30 CET (UTC+1)	Llonch (yellow card) 28'; Heerkens (yellow card) 38'; Holmén (yellow card) 90+5'	Report	Paal (yellow card) 43'; Lam (red card) 79'; Van Polen (yellow card) 85'	Stadium: Koning Willem II Stadion; Attendance: 13,337; Referee: Erwin Blank

2 February 2020 21	Willem II	1–0	Heracles Almelo	Tilburg
12:15 CET (UTC+1)	Holmén 26'	Report	Merkel (yellow card) 60'; Kiomourtzoglou (yellow card) 67'	Stadium: Koning Willem II Stadion; Attendance: 13,417; Referee: Kevin Blom

8 February 2020 22	PSV	3–0	Willem II	Eindhoven
19:45 CET (UTC+1)	Dumfries 32', (yellow card) 58'; Thomas 70'; Trésor 90+4'	Report	Llonch (yellow card) 64'	Stadium: Philips Stadion; Attendance: 34,700; Referee: Allard Lindhout

16 February 2020 23	Willem II	1–1	Utrecht	Tilburg
16:45 CET (UTC+1)	Nieuwkoop (yellow card) 78'; Gladon 90+1'	Report	Bahebeck 4'; Gustafson (yellow card) 90+2'	Stadium: Koning Willem II Stadion; Attendance: 14,107; Referee: Siemen Mulder

22 February 2020 24	Emmen	4–2	Willem II	Emmen
18:30 CET (UTC+1)	Araujo 20'; De Leeuw 60'; Adžić 61'; Heylen (yellow card) 71'; Peña 79'	Report	Llonch 58'; Trésor 72' (pen.); Saddiki (yellow card) 86'	Stadium: De Oude Meerdijk; Attendance: 8,190; Referee: Martin Pérez

28 February 2020 25	Willem II	3–1	Groningen	Tilburg
20:00 CET (UTC+1)	Nunnely 27'; Pavlidis 40'; Köhlert 64'	Report	Van Hintum (yellow card) 34'; El Messaoudi 74'; Matusiwa (yellow card) 80'; Poll (yellow card) 82'; Zeefuik (yellow card) 84'	Stadium: Koning Willem II Stadion; Attendance: 13,607; Referee: Richard Martens

8 March 2020 26	Feyenoord	2–0	Willem II	Rotterdam
14:30 CET (UTC+1)	Toornstra 30', (yellow card) 89'; Berghuis 35' (pen.); Karsdorp (yellow card) 67'; Özyakup (yellow card) 84'; Botteghin (yellow card) 87'	Report	Peters (yellow card) 64'	Stadium: De Kuip; Attendance: 47,500; Referee: Pol van Boekel

14 March 2020 27	Willem II	Cancelled	Heerenveen	Tilburg
18:30 CET (UTC+1)				Stadium: Koning Willem II Stadion
Note: Match was initially scheduled for 14 March, but cancelled due to the COVID-19 pandemic in the Netherlands.

21 March 2020 28	Vitesse	Cancelled	Willem II	Arnhem
19:45 CET (UTC+1)				Stadium: GelreDome
Note: Match was initially scheduled for 21 March, but cancelled due to the COVID-19 pandemic in the Netherlands.

4 April 2020 29	VVV-Venlo	Cancelled	Willem II	Venlo
19:45 CEST (UTC+2)				Stadium: De Koel
Note: Match was initially scheduled for 4 April, but cancelled due to the COVID-19 pandemic in the Netherlands.

11 April 2020 30	Willem II	Cancelled	ADO Den Haag	Tilburg
20:45 CEST (UTC+2)				Stadium: Koning Willem II Stadion
Note: Match was initially scheduled for 11 April, but cancelled due to the COVID-19 pandemic in the Netherlands.

22 April 2020 31	RKC Waalwijk	Cancelled	Willem II	Waalwijk
20:45 CEST (UTC+2)				Stadium: Mandemakers Stadion
Note: Match was initially scheduled for 22 April, but cancelled due to the COVID-19 pandemic in the Netherlands.

26 April 2020 32	Willem II	Cancelled	Ajax	Tilburg
18:30 CEST (UTC+2)				Stadium: Koning Willem II Stadion
Note: Match was initially scheduled for 26 April, but cancelled due to the COVID-19 pandemic in the Netherlands.

3 May 2020 33	Sparta Rotterdam	Cancelled	Willem II	Rotterdam
20:45 CEST (UTC+2)				Stadium: Het Kasteel
Note: Match was initially scheduled for 3 May, but cancelled due to the COVID-19 pandemic in the Netherlands.

10 May 2020 34	Willem II	Cancelled	Twente	Tilburg
18:30 CEST (UTC+2)				Stadium: Koning Willem II Stadion
Note: Match was initially scheduled for 10 May, but cancelled due to the COVID-19 pandemic in the Netherlands.

=== KNVB Cup ===
30 October 2019 First round	Quick	0–4	Willem II	The Hague
19:45 CET (UTC+1)		Report	Trésor 2', 25', 73'; Gladon 77'	Stadium: Sportpark Nieuw Hanenburg; Attendance: 1,000; Referee: Luca Evian Cantineau

18 December 2019 Second round	Willem II	3–0	Sparta Rotterdam	Tilburg
19:45 CET (UTC+1)	Pavlidis 19'; Trésor 24'; Nunnely 31'	Report		Stadium: Koning Willem II Stadion; Attendance: 10,047; Referee: Ingmar Oostrom

22 January 2020 Round of 16	SC Heerenveen	2–2 (a.e.t.) (4–3 p)	Willem II	Heerenveen
20:45 CET (UTC+1)	Faik 48' (pen.); Saddiki 76' (o.g.)	Report	Pavlidis 20'; Dankerlui 81'	Stadium: Abe Lenstra Stadion; Attendance: 7,102; Referee: Pol van Boekel
	Penalties
	Faik (penalty scored); Drešević (penalty scored); Espejord (penalty missed); Halilović (penalty scored); Ejuke (penalty scored)		(penalty missed) Heerkens; (penalty scored) Trésor; (penalty scored) Nelom; (penalty missed) Vrousai; (penalty scored) Holmén
