= Vangelis Pavlidis =

Greek footballer (born 1998)

Vangélis Pavlídis
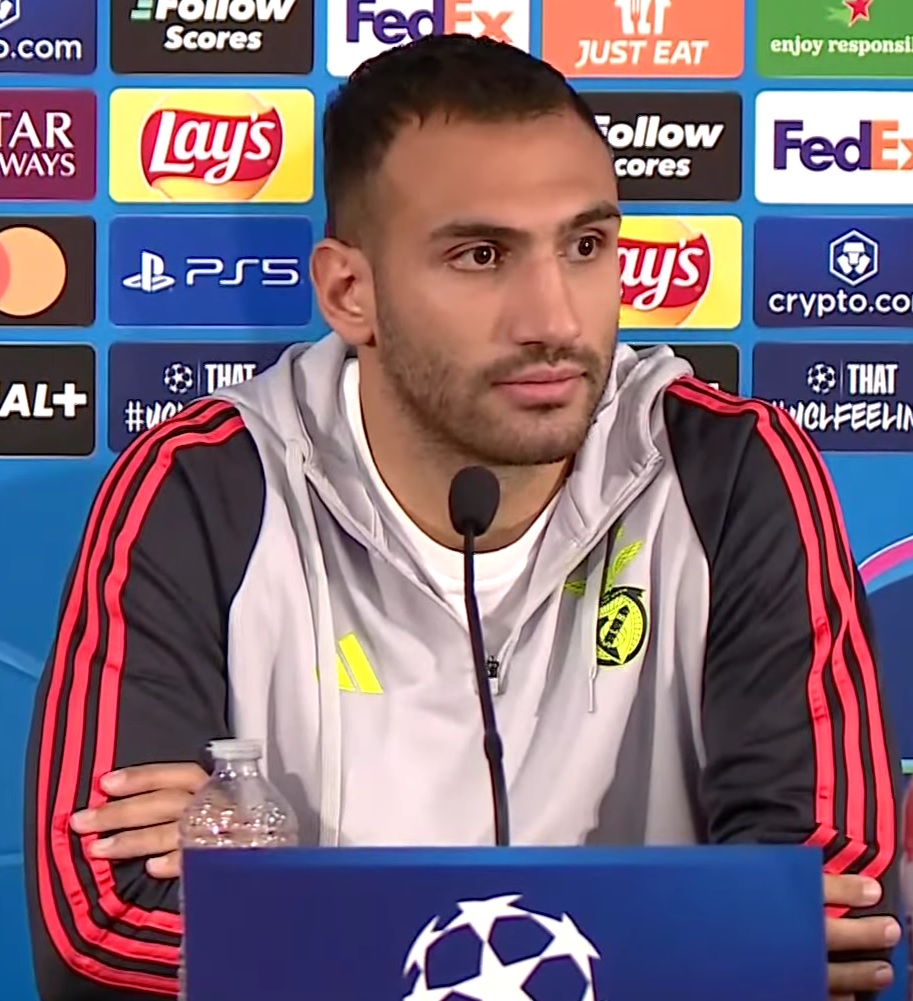
- Vangélis Pavlídis with SL Benfica in 2025

Personal information
- Full name: Vangélis Pavlídis
- Date of birth: 21 November 1998 (age 27)
- Place of birth: Thessaloniki, Greece
- Height: 1.86 m (6 ft 1 in)
- Position: Striker

Team information
- Current team: Benfica
- Number: 14

Youth career
- 2004–2014: Bebides 2000 FA Salonika
- 2015–2017: VfL Bochum

Senior career*
Years	Team	Apps	(Gls)
2016–2019	VfL Bochum	4	(0)
2018–2019	→ Borussia Dortmund II (loan)	32	(7)
2019	→ Willem II (loan)	14	(5)
2019–2021	Willem II	59	(23)
2021–2024	AZ	92	(57)
2024–	Benfica	78	(52)

International career^{‡}
2014–2015	Greece U17	13	(4)
2015–2017	Greece U19	11	(3)
2018	Greece U20	2	(0)
2019	Greece U21	2	(3)
2019–	Greece	61	(10)
- * Club domestic league appearances and goals as of 8 November 2026 ‡ National team caps and goals as of 4 October 2026

Vangélis Pavlídis (Greek: Βαγγέλης Παυλίδης; [vaɲˈɟelis paˈvliðis]; born 21 November 1998) is a Greek professional footballer who plays as a centre forward for Primeira Liga club Benfica and the Greece national team.

Born and raised in Thessaloniki, Greece, Pavlidis started his professional career with VfL Bochum in 2016 and then represented Willem II before signing with AZ Alkmaar in 2021, being crowned the Eredivisie top scorer in 2024. In July 2024, he signed with Benfica for a fee of €18 million.

Pavlidis represented Greece at various youth levels and made his senior debut for Greece in 2019.

== Club career ==
=== VfL Bochum ===
On 9 April 2016, Pavlidis signed a professional contract until the summer of 2019. On 15 May 2016, he made his debut with the club as a substitute in a 2. Bundesliga 4–2 away win against 1. FC Heidenheim.

==== Loan to Borussia Dortmund II ====
On 26 January 2018, Pavlidis joined Borussia Dortmund II on loan for the second half of the season. On 22 June 2018, Pavlidis loan spell was extended until summer 2019.

=== Willem II ===
On 17 January 2019, Willem II confirmed the signing Pavlidis on loan from Bochum until the end of the 2018–19 season. On 23 January, he scored his first goal with the club after Marios Vrousai's assist in a 3–2 away KNVB Beker win against FC Twente. On 16 February, he scored his first goal in Eredivisie. Over six months, Pavlidis recorded six goals and five assists in seventeen matches.

On 29 April, Pavlidis signed a permanent deal with the club. Subsequently, that year, on 2 August, in the opening game of the 2019–20 Eredivisie, Pavlidis scored twice as Willem II won 3–1 against PEC Zwolle. He started the following season by scoring four goals in his first two Eredivisie matches, before adding seven goals the rest of the campaign. With the season being abandoned due to the COVID-19 pandemic in the Netherlands, Willem II finished fifth place in the Eredivisie, earning a spot in the Europa League second qualifying round.

On 16 September 2020, Pavlidis scored twice in the Europa League qualifying match against Progrès Niederkorn, which ended in a 5–0 win. Willem II were eliminated in the next round by Scottish side Rangers, following a 4–0 loss. On the final matchday, Pavlidis scored a stunning solo goal in a 2–1 win against Fortuna Sittard, that kept Willem II in the Eredivisie.

=== AZ Alkmaar ===
On 9 July 2021, Pavlidis signed a contract until 2025 at Dutch club AZ Alkmaar. He made his debut for AZ on 14 August as a substitute against RKC Waalwijk and started his first match four days later in a UEFA Europa League qualifier against Celtic.

On 29 August, he scored his first goal for AZ against Heerenveen. Later that year, on 1 December, Pavlidis was one of the eleven nominees for the 2021 Puskás Award. He finished the season with 25 goals in 51 matches. He also scored in the final of the European play-offs against Vitesse, helping AZ qualify for the Europa League second qualifying round. In the Eredivisie, he scored sixteen goals, ranking third on the top scorers list behind Sébastien Haller and Loïs Openda.

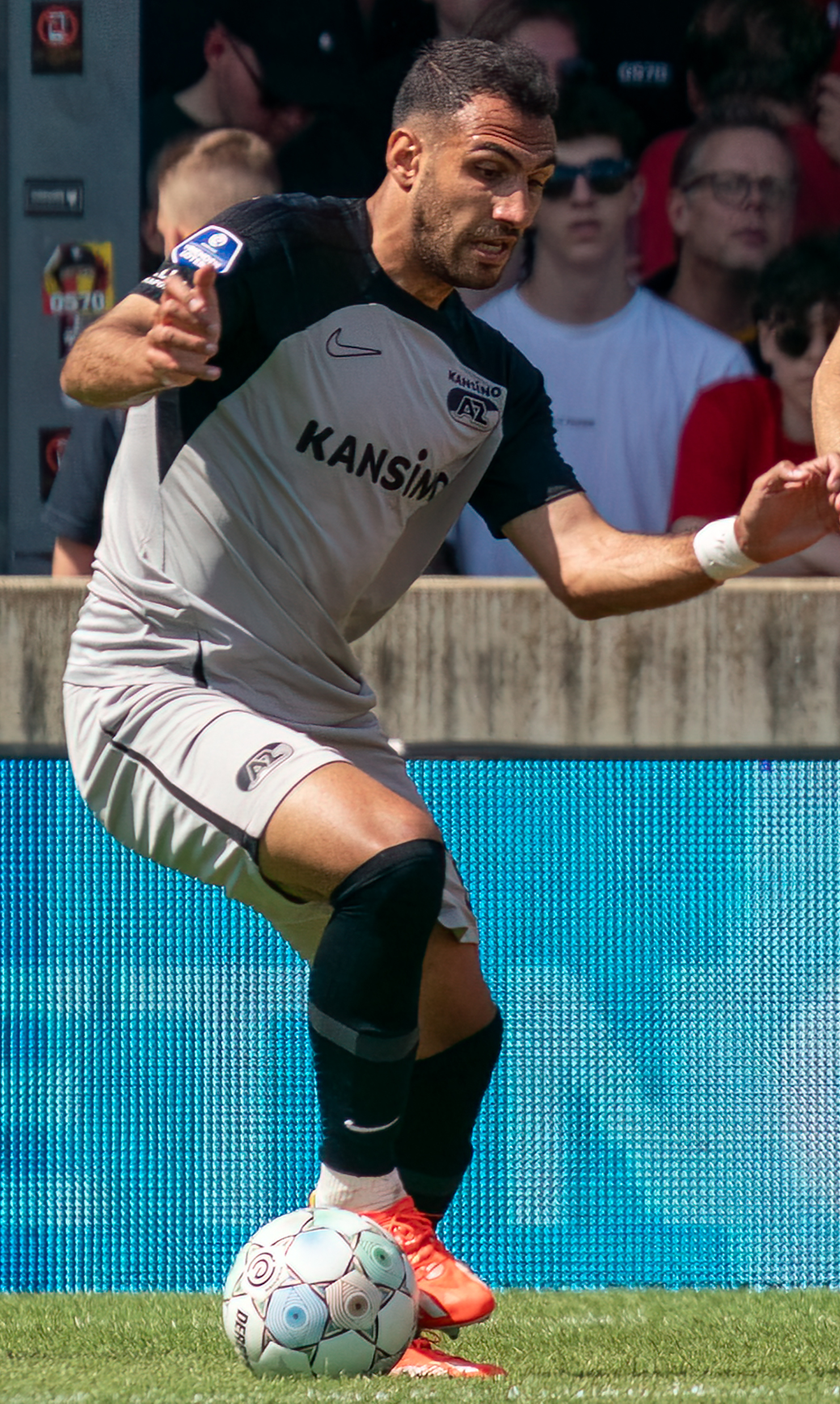
Pavlidis playing for AZ in 2024

In the 2022–23 season, Pavlidis was sidelined for two months with an ankle injury, but still managed to score eight goals in the thirteen matches he played before the winter break. On 28 January 2023, he netted a hat-trick in a thrilling 5–5 draw against Utrecht, where his compatriot Anastasios Douvikas also scored a hat-trick. On 21 May, he provided a hat-trick of assists in a 3–0 victory against NEC Nijmegen. That season, AZ reached the semi-finals of the UEFA Europa Conference League, where they were eliminated by West Ham United and finished the season with 22 goals and 14 assists in 40 matches.

The following season, Pavlidis became the first player in Eredivisie history to score in each of the first nine matchdays. He ended that streak with a hat-trick in a 3–0 victory against Heerenveen, bringing his total to thirteen goals in those nine games. He finished the Eredivisie season with 29 goals, making him the joint top scorer alongside Luuk de Jong.

=== Benfica ===
On 1 July 2024, Pavlidis joined Primeira Liga side Benfica on a permanent deal, signing a five-year contract with the club; the transfer reportedly commanded an €18 million fee, plus €2 million in possible add-ons, and a 10% sell-on clause in favor of AZ Alkmaar.

==== 2024–25 season ====
He made his competitive debut for his new club in a 2–0 loss to Famalicão on 11 August 2024, and scored his first goal in a 3–0 win against Casa Pia three days later. On 27 November, he scored his maiden Champions League goal in a 3–2 away win over Monaco. On 11 January 2025, Pavlidis won his first trophy with Benfica, as they defeated crosstown rivals Sporting CP in the Taça da Liga final on penalties following a 1–1 draw in normal time.

On 21 January, he netted his first Champions League hat-trick against Barcelona. All his goals came inside the opening 30 minutes, making it the third-fastest treble from the start of a match in the competition's history. Despite his performance, the match ended in a 5–4 loss. After a slow start to the season, Pavlidis scored nine goals in eight matches, including the first goal in the 2–0 win over Juventus in the Champions League, on 29 January, securing his team's progression to the knockout phase play-offs qualification.

In February, he scored in both legs against Monaco in the Champions League knockout phase play-offs as Benfica secured a 4–3 aggregate victory to advance to the Champions League round of 16. His seventh goal of the European campaign made him Benfica's top scorer in the Champions League, surpassing João Mário's record of six goals set in the 2023–24 season.

Later that month, Pavlidis earned the league's Player of the Month and Forward of the Month awards. On 7 April, he scored a hat-trick in a 4–1 away win over rivals Porto in O Clássico. His first goal was the fastest goal scored away in the history of O Clássico and Pavlidis also became the first Benfica player to score three goals in the Estádio do Dragão.

==== 2025–present ====
In the 2025–26 season, Pavlidis scored 22 goals in the Primeira Liga, setting a new personal best. On 30 July 2026, he scored a super hat-trick in a 5–0 victory over FC St. Gallen in the Europa League second qualifying round.

== International career ==
Pavlidis represented Greece at under-17, taking part in the 2015 UEFA European Under-17 Championship, where Greece were eliminated in the group stage. He also played at under-19, under-20 and under-21 levels, for a total of 28 caps, scoring 10 goals.

On 29 August 2019, he was called up to the Greek senior team by coach John van 't Schip for the forthcoming Euro 2020 qualifiers against Finland and Liechtenstein. On 10 October 2024, he scored two goals against England in a 2–1 away Nations League victory, marking the first time Greece had beaten their opponents. In his celebration, he paid an emotional tribute to his recently deceased national teammate George Baldock, who had died the day prior. He held aloft a shirt with Baldock's name on it.

== Personal life ==
Pavlidis was born in Thessaloniki to a Pontic Greek family from the village of Katachas in Pieria. His mother hails from the village Alistrati.

== Career statistics ==
=== Club ===
As of match played 8 November 2026

Appearances and goals by club, season and competition
Club	Season	League			National cup (Note: Includes KNVB Cup, Taça de Portugal)		League cup (Note: Includes Taça da Liga)		Europe		Other		Total	
Club	Season	Division	Apps	Goals	Apps	Goals	Apps	Goals	Apps	Goals	Apps	Goals	Apps	Goals
VfL Bochum	2015–16	2. Bundesliga	1	0	0	0	—		—		—		1	0
VfL Bochum	2016–17	2. Bundesliga	3	0	0	0	—		—		—		3	0
VfL Bochum	Total		4	0	0	0	—		—		—		4	0
Borussia Dortmund II (loan)	2017–18	Regionalliga West	17	5	—		—		—		—		17	5
Borussia Dortmund II (loan)	2018–19	Regionalliga West	15	2	—		—		—		—		15	2
Borussia Dortmund II (loan)	Total		32	7	—		—		—		—		32	7
Willem II (loan)	2018–19	Eredivisie	14	5	3	1	—		—		—		17	6
Willem II	2019–20	Eredivisie	25	11	3	2	—		—		—		28	13
Willem II	2020–21	Eredivisie	34	12	1	0	—		2 (Note: Appearances in UEFA Europa League)	2	—		37	14
Willem II	Total		73	28	7	3	—		2	2	—		82	33
AZ	2021–22	Eredivisie	33	16	4	3	—		10 (Note: Two appearances in UEFA Europa League, eight appearances and four goals in UEFA Europa Conference League)	4	4 (Note: Appearances in Eredivisie European play-offs)	2	51	25
AZ	2022–23	Eredivisie	25	12	2	1	—		13 (Note: Appearances in UEFA Europa Conference League)	9	—		40	22
AZ	2023–24	Eredivisie	34	29	2	1	—		10	3	—		46	33
AZ	Total		92	57	8	5	—		33	16	4	2	137	80
Benfica	2024–25	Primeira Liga	34	19	3	1	4	2	12 (Note: Appearances in UEFA Champions League)	7	4 (Note: Appearances in FIFA Club World Cup)	1	57	30
Benfica	2025–26	Primeira Liga	33	22	3	3	2	2	14	2	1 (Note: Appearance in Supertaça Cândido de Oliveira)	1	53	30
Benfica	2026–27	Primeira Liga	11	11	0	0	0	0	8	8	—		19	19
Benfica	Total		78	52	6	4	6	4	34	17	5	2	129	79
Career total			279	144	21	12	6	4	69	35	9	4	384	199

=== International ===
As of match played 27 September 2026

Appearances and goals by national team and year
National team	Year	Apps	Goals
Greece	2019	5	1
Greece	2020	5	0
Greece	2021	11	4
Greece	2022	6	1
Greece	2023	9	0
Greece	2024	8	2
Greece	2025	9	2
Greece	2026	6	0
Total		59	10

Scores and results list Greece's goal tally first, score column indicates score after each Pavlidis goal.

List of international goals scored by Vangelis Pavlidis
No.	Date	Venue	Cap	Opponent	Score	Result	Competition
1	15 October 2019	Olympic Stadium, Athens, Greece	3	Bosnia and Herzegovina	1–0	2–1	UEFA Euro 2020 qualifying
2	28 March 2021	Toumba Stadium, Thessaloniki, Greece	11	Honduras	1–0	2–1	Friendly
3	28 March 2021	Toumba Stadium, Thessaloniki, Greece	11	Honduras	2–1	2–1	Friendly
4	1 September 2021	St. Jakob-Park, Basel, Switzerland	15	Switzerland	1–1	1–2	Friendly
5	8 September 2021	Olympic Stadium, Athens, Greece	17	Sweden	2–0	2–1	2022 FIFA World Cup qualification
6	9 June 2022	Panthessaliko Stadium, Volos, Greece	26	Cyprus	2–0	3–0	2022–23 UEFA Nations League C
7	10 October 2024	Wembley Stadium, London, England	41	England	1–0	2–1	2024–25 UEFA Nations League B
8	10 October 2024	Wembley Stadium, London, England	41	England	2–1	2–1	2024–25 UEFA Nations League B
9	7 June 2025	Pankritio Stadium, Heraklion, Greece	47	Slovakia	2–1	4–1	Friendly
10	5 September 2025	Karaiskakis Stadium, Pireaus, Greece	49	Belarus	2–0	5–1	2026 FIFA World Cup qualification

== Honours ==
Benfica

- Taça da Liga: 2024–25
- Supertaça Cândido de Oliveira: 2025

Individual

- Eredivisie Player of the Month: August 2023, October 2023
- Eredivisie top scorer: 2023–24 (shared with Luuk de Jong)
- Best Greek Player playing Abroad: 2023–24, 2024–25
- Primeira Liga Player of the Month: February 2025, December 2025
- Primeira Liga Forward of the Month: February 2025, December 2025
- Primeira Liga Team of the Year: 2024–25
