= Kwasi Okyere Wriedt =

Ghanaian footballer (born 1994)

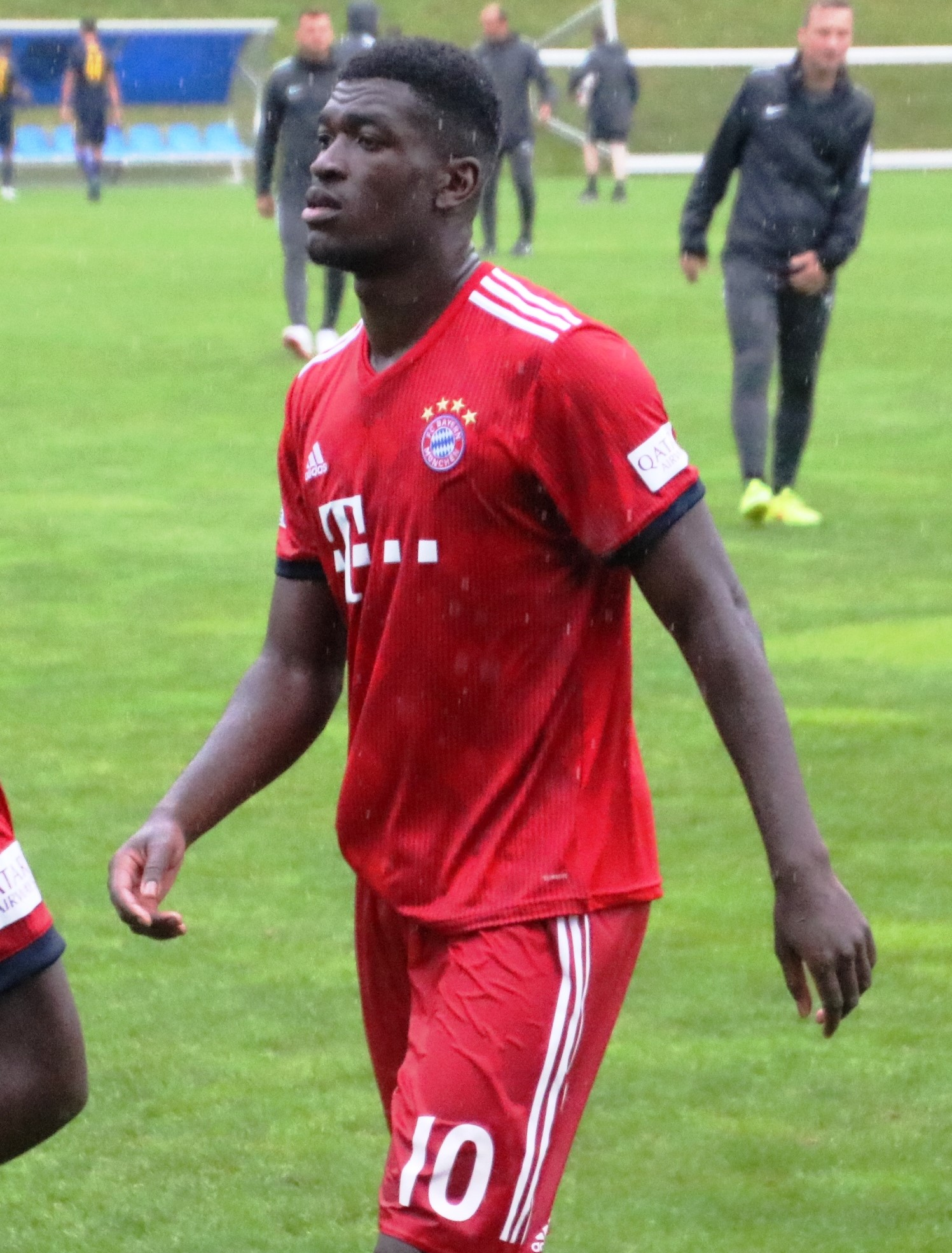
- Wriedt in 2018

Personal information
- Date of birth: 10 July 1994 (age 32)
- Place of birth: Hamburg, Germany
- Height: 1.88 m (6 ft 2 in)
- Position: Forward

Team information
- Current team: TSV Havelse
- Number: 11

Youth career
- 1999–2008: SC Hamm 02
- 2008–2009: SC Concordia Hamburg
- 2009–2013: FC St. Pauli

Senior career*
| Years | Team | Apps | (Gls) |
| 2013–2015 | FC St. Pauli II | 58 | (14) |
| 2015–2016 | LSK Hansa | 34 | (23) |
| 2016–2017 | VfL Osnabrück | 39 | (12) |
| 2017–2020 | Bayern Munich II | 96 | (69) |
| 2017–2020 | Bayern Munich | 2 | (0) |
| 2020–2022 | Willem II | 42 | (12) |
| 2022–2024 | Holstein Kiel | 41 | (6) |
| 2023–2024 | → VfL Osnabrück (loan) | 23 | (1) |
| 2024–2025 | Manisa | 20 | (3) |
| 2025 | Şanlıurfaspor | 17 | (3) |
| 2025–2026 | Alemannia Aachen | 15 | (1) |
| 2026– | TSV Havelse | 0 | (0) |

International career^{‡}
| 2015 | Ghana U20 | 1 | (0) |
| 2018–2022 | Ghana | 6 | (0) |
- * Club domestic league appearances and goals as of 3 July 2026 ‡ National team caps and goals as of 5 June 2022

Kwasi Okyere Wriedt (born 10 July 1994) is a professional footballer who plays as a forward for German 3. Liga club TSV Havelse. Born in Germany, he plays for the Ghana national team.

== Club career ==
=== Bayern Munich ===
Wriedt made his debut for Bayern Munich on 25 October 2017, coming on as a substitute in the 101st minute for Thiago in an away match against RB Leipzig in the second round of the 2017–18 edition of the DFB-Pokal. The match finished 1–1 after extra time, with Bayern advancing after winning 5–4 in a penalty shoot-out.

=== Willem II ===
On 1 July 2020, three days before the final match of the season, Wriedt joined Willem II on a three-year contract along with Bayern Munich II teammate Derrick Köhn.

=== Holstein Kiel ===
Wriedt moved to 2. Bundesliga side Holstein Kiel on 20 January 2022, having agreed a contract until summer 2025. Three days after signing for the club, he made his debut by coming on in the 74th minute for Benedikt Pichler in a 2–1 win Jahn Regensburg. He scored his debut goal on 11 February 2022, coming on in the 69th minute to score a 90th-minute winner in a 3–2 victory over Erzgebirge Aue.

On 23 June 2023, Wriedt agreed to return to VfL Osnabrück on a season-long loan.

=== Turkey ===
On 12 July 2024, Wriedt signed a one-season contract with Turkish TFF First League club Manisa. Six months later, in January 2025, he joined Şanlıurfaspor.

== International career ==
Wriedt received his first call-up to the Ghana national team on 9 May 2018, ahead of friendlies against Japan and Iceland. He made his debut on 30 May 2018, coming on in the 82nd minute for Emmanuel Boateng in a 2–0 victory over Japan.

== Career statistics ==
=== Club ===
As of 28 May 2023

Appearances and goals by club, season and competition
| Club | Season | League | | | Cup (Note: Includes the Lower Saxony Cup and DFB-Pokal) | | Continental | | Other | | Total | |
| Club | Season | Division | Apps | Goals | Apps | Goals | Apps | Goals | Apps | Goals | Apps | Goals |
|---|---|---|---|---|---|---|---|---|---|---|---|---|
| FC St. Pauli II | 2012–13 | Regionalliga Nord | 5 | 0 | — | | — | | — | | 5 | 0 |
| FC St. Pauli II | 2013–14 | Regionalliga Nord | 31 | 9 | — | | — | | — | | 31 | 9 |
| FC St. Pauli II | 2014–15 | Regionalliga Nord | 22 | 5 | — | | — | | — | | 22 | 5 |
| FC St. Pauli II | Total | | 58 | 14 | 0 | 0 | 0 | 0 | 0 | 0 | 58 | 14 |
| LSK Hansa | 2015–16 | Regionalliga Nord | 34 | 23 | 1 | 2 | — | | — | | 35 | 25 |
| VfL Osnabrück | 2016–17 | 3. Liga | 36 | 12 | 4 | 2 | — | | — | | 40 | 14 |
| VfL Osnabrück | 2017–18 | 3. Liga | 3 | 0 | — | | — | | — | | 3 | 0 |
| VfL Osnabrück | Total | | 39 | 12 | 4 | 2 | 0 | 0 | 0 | 0 | 43 | 14 |
| Bayern Munich II | 2017–18 | Regionalliga Bayern | 29 | 21 | — | | — | | — | | 29 | 21 |
| Bayern Munich II | 2018–19 | Regionalliga Bayern | 34 | 24 | — | | — | | — | | 34 | 24 |
| Bayern Munich II | 2019–20 | 3. Liga | 33 | 24 | — | | — | | — | | 33 | 24 |
| Bayern Munich II | Total | | 96 | 69 | 0 | 0 | 0 | 0 | 0 | 0 | 96 | 69 |
| Bayern Munich | 2017–18 | Bundesliga | 1 | 0 | 1 | 0 | 0 | 0 | 0 | 0 | 2 | 0 |
| Bayern Munich | 2019–20 | Bundesliga | 1 | 0 | 0 | 0 | 0 | 0 | 0 | 0 | 1 | 0 |
| Bayern Munich | Total | | 2 | 0 | 1 | 0 | 0 | 0 | 0 | 0 | 3 | 0 |
| Willem II | 2020–21 | Eredivisie | 24 | 8 | 1 | 0 | 0 | 0 | — | | 25 | 8 |
| Willem II | 2021–22 | Eredivisie | 18 | 4 | 1 | 0 | — | | 0 | 0 | 19 | 4 |
| Willem II | Total | | 42 | 12 | 2 | 0 | 0 | 0 | 0 | 0 | 44 | 12 |
| Holstein Kiel | 2021–22 | 2. Bundesliga | 15 | 3 | 0 | 0 | — | | — | | 15 | 3 |
| Holstein Kiel | 2022–23 | 2. Bundesliga | 26 | 3 | 1 | 0 | — | | — | | 27 | 3 |
| Holstein Kiel | Total | | 41 | 6 | 1 | 0 | — | | — | | 42 | 6 |
| Career total | | | 312 | 136 | 9 | 4 | 0 | 0 | 0 | 0 | 321 | 140 |

=== International ===
As of 29 March 2022

Appearances and goals by national team and year
| National team | Year | Apps | Goals |
|---|---|---|---|
| Ghana | 2018 | 2 | 0 |
| Ghana | 2019 | 0 | 0 |
| Ghana | 2020 | 0 | 0 |
| Ghana | 2021 | 1 | 0 |
| Ghana | 2022 | 2 | 0 |
| Total | | 5 | 0 |

== Honours ==
Bayern Munich

- DFL-Supercup: 2017, 2018
- Bundesliga: 2017–18, 2018–19, 2019–20
- DFB-Pokal: 2018–19

Bayern Munich II

- 3. Liga: 2019–20
- Regionalliga Bayern: 2018–19

Individual

- 3. Liga Player of the Season: 2019–20
- 3. Liga top goalscorer: 2019–20
