= Marios Vrousai =

Greek association footballer

Personal information
- Full name: Marios Vrousai
- Date of birth: 2 July 1998 (age 28)
- Place of birth: Berat, Albania
- Height: 1.83 m (6 ft 0 in)
- Positions: Full-back; wide midfielder

Team information
- Current team: Rio Ave
- Number: 17

Youth career
- 2009–2015: Nafpaktiakos Asteras
- 2015–2018: Olympiacos

Senior career*
Years	Team	Apps	(Gls)
2018–2024	Olympiacos	56	(4)
2019–2020	→ Willem II (loan)	37	(6)
2023	Olympiacos B	3	(0)
2024	→ Rio Ave (loan)	14	(1)
2024–	Rio Ave	62	(2)

International career
2016–2017	Greece U19	10	(3)
2017–2020	Greece U21	10	(2)
2019–2021	Greece	5	(0)
- * Club domestic league appearances and goals as of 25 May 2026

Marios Vrousai (Greek: Μάριος Βρουσάι; Albanian: Marius Vrushaj; born 2 July 1998) is a Greek professional footballer who plays as a full-back or wide midfielder for and captains Primeira Liga club Rio Ave. Born in Albania, he represents the Greece national team.

== Club career ==
=== Olympiacos ===
Vrousai made his Greek Super League debut for Olympiacos on 16 April 2018 in a home game against Kerkyra. Vrousai entered the court of Karaiskakis Stadium in the 78th minute of the game, as the third substitute of Olympiacos' interim coach Christos Kontis, taking the place of Belgian international Kevin Mirallas. Nine minutes later, he scored the first goal of his professional career, after receiving an assist by team's striker Karim Ansarifard. Vrousai made three more Super League caps until the end of the season and was considered as one of the most talented players from the youth academy of the Greek club.

On 9 August 2018, he made his debut in the European competitions during the UEFA Europa League third qualifying round against FC Luzern. Olympiacos got a 4–0 victory versus the Swiss team at Karaiskakis Stadium for the first leg of the round and Vrousai played as a late substitute for the last 12 minutes of the match. Portuguese manager Pedro Martins replaced Lazaros Christodoulopoulos with the 20-year-old Vrousai and gave him the chance for his first ever European appearance. On 19 December 2019, he scored an amazing long shot goal, the first of Olympiacos in the 1–2 road victory versus Aris Avato at Xanthi Ground for the last matchday of the Group Stage of the 2018–19 Greek Football Cup.

=== Loan to Willem II ===
On 16 January 2019, Vrousai hasn't been counted on by Pedro Martins, and he has been allowed to join Dutch club Willem II on loan, for the remainder of the season. In accordance with the agreement between Olympiacos and Willem II, Vrousai is set to stay on loan with the Dutch club until the completion of the 2019–20 season. If Willem II wish to sign Vrousai on a permanent basis, the release clause amounts to €1 million, while in the event Olympiacos wanted to end his loan prematurely this summer, they would have to pay the Eredivisie team a fee. A lot also depends on the player's personal wishes. Olympiacos would be able to re-sign Vrousai for €2 million in the future if Willem II activated the release clause of one million.

On 20 January 2019, Marios Vrousai scored in his debut with Willem's jersey, sealing a 2–0 home win game against Breda after Vangelis Pavlidis assist. On 2 February 2019, he scored after an assist from Daniel Crowley in a frustrating 1–2 home loss against FC Groningen. On 24 February 2019, he opened the score with a header in a 2–1 home win game against AZ Alkmaar.

On 18 August 2019, in the third game of the 2019–20 Eredivisie Vrousai scored with a good header, in a 2–3 away win against Fortuna Sittard. It was his first goal for the season. On 19 October 2019, he successfully connected with a floating cross from the right wing, planting a firm header beyond Twente goalkeeper Joel Drommel, after an assist from Freek Heerkens, sealing a vital 1–0 away win against FC Twente. On 27 October 2019, Vrousai will be out of action for 4–6 weeks after being hit in the ankle during Willem's training. On 23 November 2019, he returned to the squad, playing as a substitute in a vital away 3–3 draw against ADO Den Haag.

=== Return to Olympiakos ===
On 12 February 2021, Vrousai signed a new contract with Olympiakos. The new contract of the 22-year-old midfielder will be completed in the summer of 2024. The young striker has been in the first team of Olympiakos since 2018 and during the 2020–21 season, he has managed to become an important part of them, after his return from Willem, having 21 appearances and 3 goals.

==== Loan to Rio Ave ====
In January 2024, Vrousai joined Portuguese Primeira Liga club Rio Ave on loan for the remainder of the season.

== International career ==
On 29 August 2019, Vrousai was called up to the Greek senior team by coach John van 't Schip for the forthcoming Euro 2020 qualifiers against Finland and Liechtenstein.

== Career statistics ==
=== Club ===
As of 18 April 2025

Club	Season	League			National cup (Note: Includes Greek Football Cup, KNVB Cup, Taça de Portugal)		Continental		Total	
Club	Season	Division	Apps	Goals	Apps	Goals	Apps	Goals	Apps	Goals
Olympiacos	2017–18	Super League Greece	4	1	2	0	—		6	1
Olympiacos	2018–19	Super League Greece	1	0	3	1	2	0	6	1
Olympiacos	2020–21	Super League Greece	14	2	3	1	4	0	21	3
Olympiacos	2021–22	Super League Greece	18	1	6	0	9	0	33	1
Olympiacos	2022–23	Super League Greece	19	0	6	0	4	0	29	0
Olympiacos	2023–24	Super League Greece	0	0	1	0	4	0	5	0
Olympiacos	Total		56	4	21	2	23	0	100	6
Willem II (loan)	2018–19	Eredivisie	16	4	2	0	—		18	4
Willem II (loan)	2019–20	Eredivisie	21	2	2	0	—		23	2
Willem II (loan)	Total		37	6	4	0	—		41	6
Rio Ave (loan)	2023–24	Primeira Liga	14	1	0	0	—		14	1
Rio Ave (loan)	2024–25	Primeira Liga	31	1	6	0	—		37	1
Rio Ave (loan)	2025–26	Primeira Liga	28	1	1	0	—		29	1
Career total			166	13	32	2	23	0	221	15

== Honours ==
Olympiacos

- Super League Greece: 2020–21, 2021–22
