= Arijanet Muric =

Footballer (born 1998)

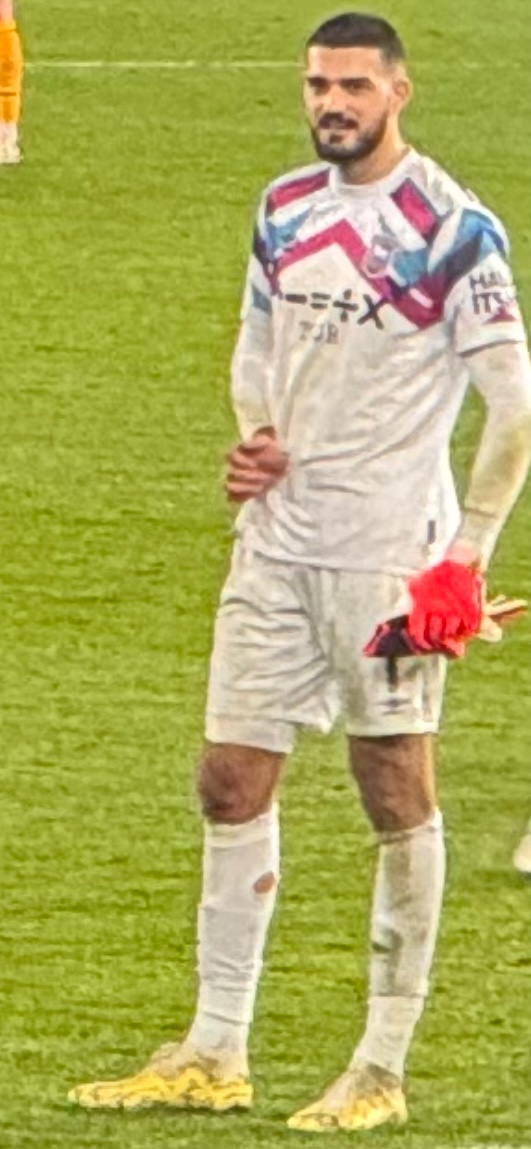
- Muric with Ipswich Town in 2024

Personal information
- Full name: Arijanet Anan Muric
- Date of birth: 7 November 1998 (age 28)
- Place of birth: Schlieren, Switzerland
- Position: Goalkeeper

Team information
- Current team: Sassuolo
- Number: 49

Youth career
- 2007–2009: Young Fellows Juventus
- 2009–2010: Zürich
- 2010–2015: Grasshopper
- 2015–2018: Manchester City

Senior career*
Years	Team	Apps	(Gls)
2018–2022	Manchester City	0	(0)
2018	→ NAC Breda (loan)	1	(0)
2019–2020	→ Nottingham Forest (loan)	4	(0)
2020–2021	→ Girona (loan)	2	(0)
2021	→ Willem II (loan)	14	(0)
2021–2022	→ Adana Demirspor (loan)	31	(0)
2022–2024	Burnley	51	(0)
2024–2026	Ipswich Town	18	(0)
2025–2026	→ Sassuolo (loan)	32	(0)
2026–	Sassuolo	0	(0)

International career^{‡}
2017	Montenegro U21	2	(0)
2018–	Kosovo	54	(0)
- * Club domestic league appearances and goals as of 23:38, 8 May 2026 (UTC) ‡ National team caps and goals as of 16:05, 18 November 2026 (UTC)

Arijanet Anan Muric (Note: Albanian: Arijanet Muriqi; Montenegrin: Аријанет Мурић, romanized: Arijanet Murić) (born 7 November 1998) is a professional footballer who plays as a goalkeeper for Serie A club Sassuolo. Born in Switzerland, he represents the Kosovo national team.

== Club career ==
=== Early career and Manchester City ===
Muric is a product of various Swiss youth teams such as Young Fellows Juventus, Zürich and Grasshoppers. In 2015, he joined with youth team of Manchester City. On 27 July 2017, Muric signed a three-year contract extension with Manchester City.

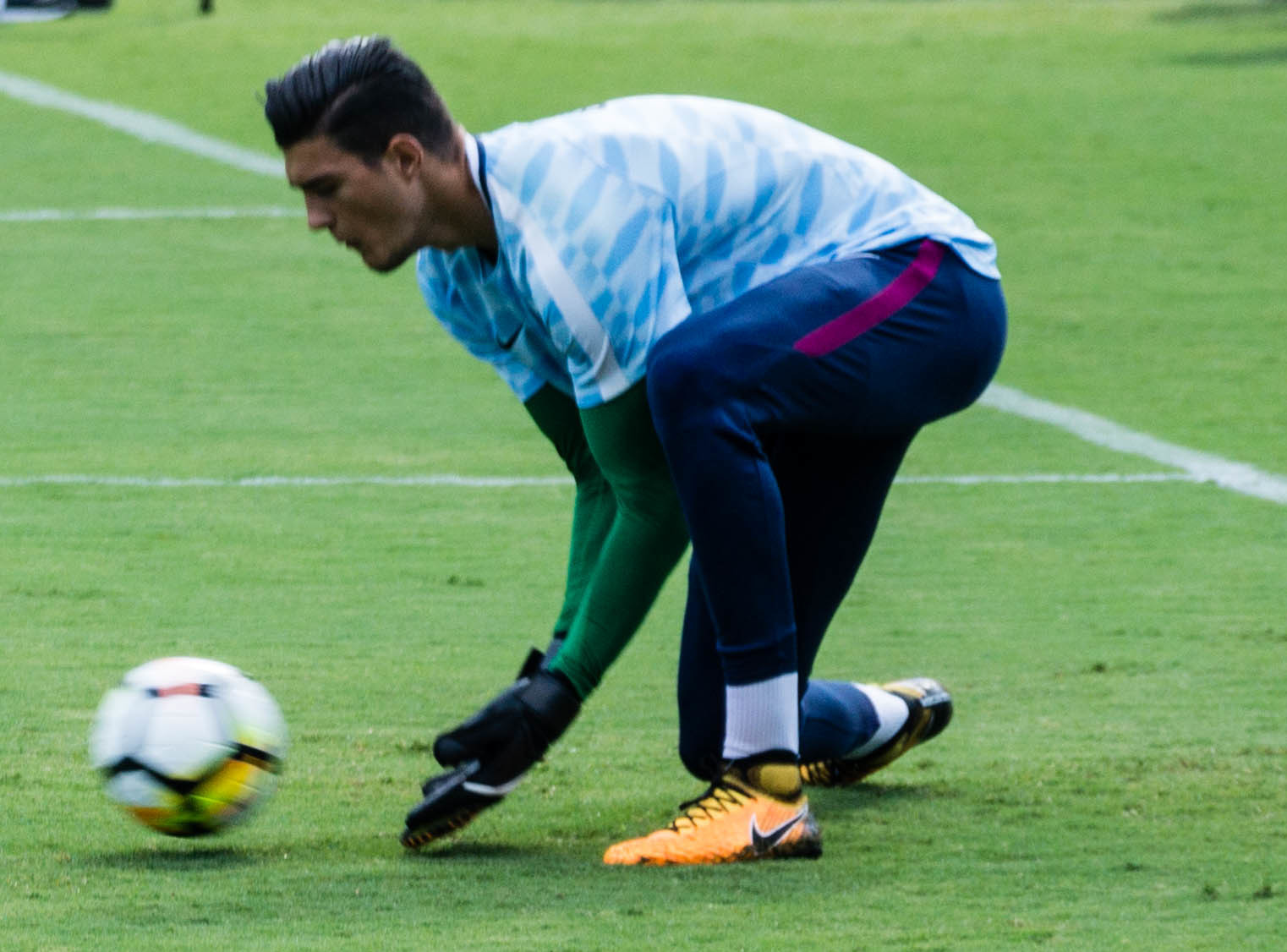
Muric with Manchester City in July 2017

==== Short-time loan at NAC Breda and return from loan ====
On 31 July 2018, Muric joined Eredivisie side NAC Breda, on a season-long loan. On 18 August 2018, he made his debut as a professional footballer in a 3–0 home win against De Graafschap after being named in the starting line-up.

Four days after debut with NAC Breda, Manchester City recalled Muric from loan to replace injured goalkeeper Claudio Bravo as their second choice. Three days later, he was named as a Manchester City substitute for the first time in a Premier League match against Wolverhampton Wanderers. His debut with Manchester City came on 25 September in the 2018–19 EFL Cup third round against Oxford United after being named in the starting line-up.

==== Loan at Nottingham Forest ====
On 9 July 2019, Muric joined EFL Championship side Nottingham Forest, on a season-long loan. On 3 August 2019, he made his debut in a 2–1 home defeat against West Bromwich Albion after being named in the starting line-up. Muric's loan move was unsuccessful, with him serving as second choice goalkeeper behind Brice Samba, and failing to connect with the rest of the Forest squad.

==== Loan at Girona ====
On 18 September 2020, Muric joined Segunda División side Girona, on a season-long loan. Eight days later, he made his debut in a 2–0 away defeat against Sporting Gijón after being named in the starting line-up.

==== Loan at Willem II ====
On 1 February 2021, Muric was loaned to Eredivisie side Willem II until the end of the season, to replace the injured Robbin Ruiter as the first choice. Thirteen days later, he made his debut in a 5–0 away defeat against Feyenoord after being named in the starting line-up.

==== Loan at Adana Demirspor ====
On 5 August 2021, Muric joined Süper Lig side Adana Demirspor, on a season-long loan. Ten days later, he made his debut in a 1–0 home defeat against Fenerbahçe after being named in the starting line-up.

=== Burnley ===
On 22 July 2022, Muric joined Championship side Burnley after agreeing to a four-year deal for an undisclosed fee. Seven days later, he made his debut in a 1–0 away win against Huddersfield Town after being named in the starting line-up.

=== Ipswich Town ===
On 17 July 2024, Muric joined newly-promoted Premier League side Ipswich Town after agreeing to a four-year deal for an undisclosed fee.

=== Sassuolo ===
On 13 August 2025, Muric joined Serie A club Sassuolo on loan for the 2025/26 season.

On 1 June 2026, Muric signed a permanent contract with the Italian club.

== International career ==
=== Montenegro ===
==== Under-21 ====
On 22 August 2017, Muric received a call-up from Montenegro U21 for the 2019 UEFA European Under-21 Championship qualification match against Kazakhstan U21 and for the friendly match against Bosnia and Herzegovina U21. Fourteen days later, he made his debut with Montenegro U21 in a friendly match against Bosnia and Herzegovina U21 after being named in the starting line-up. In both matches, he played for Montenegro U21 and he was sent off after receiving straight red cards, one for handling the ball outside the box against Bosnia and Herzegovina U21 and the other for headbutting an opponent against Slovenia U21. Despite previously declaring his will to play for Montenegro after not being called up for the senior team, he opted to represent Kosovo instead.

=== Kosovo ===
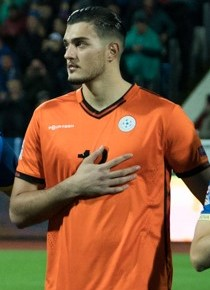
Muric with Kosovo in 2018.

On 26 August 2018, the Football Federation of Kosovo announced that after several months of talks, Muric had decided to play for the Kosovo national team. On 9 November 2018, he received a call-up from Kosovo for the 2018–19 UEFA Nations League matches against Malta and Azerbaijan. Eleven days later, he made his debut with Kosovo in a 2018–19 UEFA Nations League match against Azerbaijan after being named in the starting line-up.

== Personal life ==
Muric was born in Schlieren, Switzerland to Albanian parents from Rožaje, Montenegro. He holds Kosovar, Montenegrin and Swiss passports.

== Career statistics ==
=== Club ===
As of match played 7 November 2026

Appearances and goals by club, season and competition
Club	Season	League			National cup (Note: Includes Copa del Rey, Turkish Cup, FA Cup)		League cup (Note: Includes EFL Cup)		Other		Total	
Club	Season	Division	Apps	Goals	Apps	Goals	Apps	Goals	Apps	Goals	Apps	Goals
Manchester City U21	2017–18	—			—		—		3 (Note: All appearances in EFL Trophy)	0	3	0
Manchester City U21	2018–19	—			—		—		1	0	1	0
Manchester City U21	Total		—		—		—		4	0	4	0
Manchester City	2018–19	Premier League	0	0	0	0	5	0	0	0	5	0
NAC Breda (loan)	2018–19	Eredivisie	1	0	—		—		—		1	0
Nottingham Forest (loan)	2019–20	Championship	4	0	0	0	1	0	—		5	0
Girona (loan)	2020–21	Segunda División	2	0	4	0	—		—		6	0
Willem II (loan)	2020–21	Eredivisie	14	0	—		—		—		14	0
Adana Demirspor (loan)	2021–22	Süper Lig	31	0	1	0	—		—		32	0
Burnley	2022–23	Championship	41	0	0	0	0	0	—		41	0
Burnley	2023–24	Premier League	10	0	1	0	3	0	—		14	0
Burnley	Total		51	0	1	0	3	0	—		55	0
Ipswich Town	2024–25	Premier League	18	0	1	0	0	0	—		19	0
Sassuolo (loan)	2025–26	Serie A	32	0	0	0	—		—		32	0
Sassuolo	2026–27	Serie A	8	0	1	0	—		—		9	0
Sassuolo	Sassuolo total		40	0	1	0	—		—		41	0
Career total			161	0	8	0	9	0	4	0	182	0

=== International ===
As of match played 17 November 2026

Appearances and goals by national team and year
National team	Year	Apps	Goals
Kosovo	2018	1	0
Kosovo	2019	9	0
Kosovo	2020	6	0
Kosovo	2021	7	0
Kosovo	2022	5	0
Kosovo	2023	8	0
Kosovo	2024	6	0
Kosovo	2025	6	0
Kosovo	2026	6	0
Total		54	0

== Honours ==
Manchester City

- FA Cup: 2018–19
- EFL Cup: 2018–19

Burnley

- EFL Championship: 2022–23

Individual

- PFA Team of the Year: 2022–23 Championship
