= Mike Trésor =

Belgian footballer (born 1999)

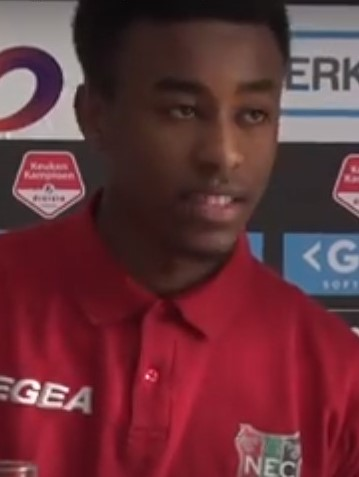
- Trésor with NEC Nijmegen in 2018

Personal information
- Full name: Mike Trésor Ndayishimiye
- Date of birth: 28 May 1999 (age 27)
- Place of birth: Lembeek, Belgium
- Height: 1.77 m (5 ft 10 in)
- Positions: Attacking midfielder; left winger

Team information
- Current team: Burnley
- Number: 31

Youth career
- KFC Avenir Lembeek
- Tubize
- –2018: Anderlecht

Senior career*
Years	Team	Apps	(Gls)
2018–2020	NEC Nijmegen	25	(6)
2019–2020	→ Willem II (loan)	20	(5)
2020–2021	Willem II	34	(4)
2021–2024	Genk	71	(8)
2023–2024	→ Burnley (loan)	16	(0)
2024–	Burnley	8	(0)

International career
2015–2016	Belgium U17	11	(1)
2016–2017	Belgium U18	4	(1)
2017–2018	Belgium U19	10	(6)
2019–2020	Belgium U21	6	(3)
2023	Belgium	2	(0)
- * Club domestic league appearances and goals as of 09:07, 3 September 2026 (UTC)

Mike Trésor Ndayishimiye (born 28 May 1999), commonly known as Mike Trésor, is a Belgian professional footballer who plays as an attacking midfielder or left winger for EFL Championship club Burnley.

The 2022–23 Belgian Pro League Footballer of the Year, Trésor amassed the most assists in a single season ever in the Belgian top flight (24), prompting his Belgian national team debut.

== Club career ==
Having been a youth team player at Anderlecht, Trésor made his Eerste Divisie debut for NEC on 21 September 2018 in a game against Helmond Sport, as a 78th-minute substitute for Jonathan Okita.

On 2 September 2019, he joined Willem II in the top-tier Eredivisie on loan for the 2019–20 season. On 30 October, Ndayishimiye scored a hat-trick in a 4–0 win against Quick in the first round of the KNVB Cup.

=== Genk ===
Trésor moved to Belgian Cup holders Racing Genk in July 2021. After a disappointing campaign where defensive frailty saw Cup-winning coach John van den Brom dismissed mid-season, and Bernd Storck only able to guide Genk to the 2022 Belgian Pro League's European play-offs, Trésor's form surged under the tenureship of new coach Wouter Vrancken.

Genk lost their opening league game of the 2022–23 season to champions Club Brugge, before going on to win 15 of their next 16 league games – drawing the other one for an unbeaten run of 16 – to go ten points clear of second-placed Union Saint-Gilloise by Christmas 2022, still top of the table by Easter 2023.

Trésor had hit double-figures in assists for the 2022–23 season by mid-October as part of Genk's impressive winning run, making him the highest-assist maker in the top-10 ranked European leagues.

Despite this, Trésor was not named by Belgium national team coach Roberto Martinez in the preliminary Belgian squad of 55 ahead of the 2022 FIFA World Cup, and did not make the plane for Qatar. A continuation in strong form saw big calls for Trésor and team-mate Bryan Heynen to be capped by new national team coach Domenico Tedesco for his first games in charge against Sweden and Germany in March 2023, but neither player was chosen. Tresor did make the next squad in June, however, for his international debut for Belgium.

With Genk being pipped for the 2022–23 Belgian Pro League due to a stoppage-time equaliser against them by Royal Antwerp's Toby Alderweireld, Tresor produced 24 assists across the 2022–23 season, a new Belgian Pro League record, breaking the previous mark of 22 from Branko Strupar set in 1999. Tresor was voted Belgian Footballer of the Year at the Pro League Awards, and also won the 2023 Ebony Shoe for best player of African extraction in the league, holding off Gent's Gift Orban, Victor Boniface of Union Saint-Gilloise and Tresor's own Genk team-mates Joseph Paintsil and Bilal El Khannouss to both awards.

=== Burnley ===
On 1 September 2023, Burnley signed Trésor on a season-long loan deal. On 21 May 2024, Burnley said the loan had been made permanent.

== International career ==
In June 2023 he was called up to the senior Belgium squad for the UEFA Euro 2024 qualifying matches against Austria and Estonia on 17 and 20 June 2023 respectively.

== Personal life ==
Trésor was born in Belgium to a Burundian father and a Rwandan mother. His father, Freddy Ndayishimiye, is a former Burundi international. He grew up in the Belgian capital, Brussels. His young brother Mattéo Karl NDAYISHIMIYE represents Rwanda

== Career statistics ==
=== Club ===
As of match played 2 September 2026

Appearances and goals by club, season and competition
Club	Season	League			National cup (Note: Includes KNVB Cup, Belgian Cup, FA Cup)		League cup (Note: Includes EFL Cup)		Europe		Other		Total	
Club	Season	Division	Apps	Goals	Apps	Goals	Apps	Goals	Apps	Goals	Apps	Goals	Apps	Goals
NEC Nijmegen	2018–19	Eerste Divisie	23	6	2	0	—		—		2 (Note: Appearances in Eerste Divisie promotion/relegation play-offs)	1	27	7
NEC Nijmegen	2019–20	Eerste Divisie	2	0	—		—		—		—		2	0
NEC Nijmegen	Total		25	6	2	0	—		—		2	1	29	7
Willem II (loan)	2019–20	Eredivisie	20	5	3	4	—		—		—		23	9
Willem II	2020–21	Eredivisie	34	4	1	0	—		2 (Note: Appearances in UEFA Europa League)	1	—		37	5
Willem II	Total		54	9	4	4	—		2	1	—		60	14
Genk	2021–22	Belgian Pro League	30	0	1	0	—		5 (Note: Two appearances in UEFA Champions League, three appearances in UEFA Europa League)	0	1 (Note: Appearance in Belgian Super Cup)	0	37	0
Genk	2022–23	Belgian Pro League	39	8	3	0	—		—		—		42	8
Genk	2023–24	Belgian Pro League	2	0	—		—		3 (Note: Two appearances and one goal in UEFA Champions League, one appearance in UEFA Europa League)	1	—		5	1
Genk	Total		71	8	4	0	—		8	1	1	0	84	9
Burnley (loan)	2023–24	Premier League	16	0	1	0	2	0	—		—		19	0
Burnley	2024–25	Championship	0	0	1	0	0	0	—		—		1	0
Burnley	2025–26	Premier League	6	0	0	0	2	0	—		—		8	0
Burnley	2026–27	Championship	2	0	0	0	2	0	—		—		4	0
Burnley	Total		24	0	2	0	6	0	—		—		32	0
Career total			174	23	12	4	6	0	10	2	3	1	205	30

=== International ===
As of match played 20 June 2023

Appearances and goals by national team and year
National team	Year	Apps	Goals
Belgium
Belgium	2023	2	0
Total		2	0

== Honours ==
Individual

- Belgian Pro League top assist provider: 2022–23
