= Wesley Spieringhs =

Dutch footballer (born 2002)

Personal information
- Date of birth: 16 January 2002 (age 24)
- Place of birth: Goirle, Netherlands
- Height: 1.88 m (6 ft 2 in)
- Position: Midfielder

Team information
- Current team: Intercity
- Number: 5

Youth career
- 2008–2012: VOAB
- 2012–2020: Willem II

Senior career*
| Years | Team | Apps | (Gls) |
| 2020–2023 | Willem II | 35 | (1) |
| 2023–2025 | Roda JC | 43 | (1) |
| 2025– | Intercity | 2 | (0) |
- * Club domestic league appearances and goals as of 21 September 2025

Wesley Spieringhs (born 16 January 2002) is a Dutch professional footballer who plays as a midfielder for Spanish Segunda Federación club Intercity.

== Career ==
=== Willem II ===
Spieringhs was born Goirle, North Brabant and began his football career with local club VOAB. In 2012 he moved to the youth academy of Willem II, where he progressed through all youth teams. In the 2019–20 season he made his first appearances in the Beloften Eredivisie for the reserves, before becoming part of the first team competing in the Eredivisie for the 2020–21 season.

He made his professional debut on 12 September 2020, the first matchday of the domestic season, in a 2–0 defeat against SC Heerenveen when he came off the bench for Dries Saddiki in the 87th minute. On 12 December, he was in the starting eleven of the Tilburg-based team for the first time in a 5–3 defeat against AZ. In the second half of the season, Spieringhs more regularly appeared in central midfield, finishing the season with 22 appearances.

At the beginning of the 2021–22 season he was mostly a substitute for Willem II, but managed to score his first professional goal on 22 August 2021 in a 3–0 win against Vitesse. After coming on as a substitute for Ché Nunnely in the 82nd minute, he scored just seconds later, heading home a cross by Max Svensson to cement the final score. In September 2021, he suffered a knee injury with tests confirming that he tore his meniscus. After surgery, he was sidelined for six months, only returning to the squad in April 2022. On 1 May, he made his first appearance after coming back from injury, coming off the bench in the 76th minute in a 4–2 loss to PSV.

=== Roda JC ===
On 4 July 2023, Spieringhs joined Eerste Divisie club Roda JC on a two-year contract, after his contract with Willem II had expired. He made his competitive debut for the club on the first matchday of the season, starting in a 4–1 home win over Helmond Sport on 11 August.

In May 2025, Roda JC announced that Spieringhs would depart the club at the end of the 2024–25 season, following the decision not to activate the option to extend his contract.

== Career statistics ==
As of match played 21 February 2025

Appearances and goals by club, season and competition
| Club | Season | League | | | KNVB Cup | | Europe | | Other | | Total | |
| Club | Season | Division | Apps | Goals | Apps | Goals | Apps | Goals | Apps | Goals | Apps | Goals |
|---|---|---|---|---|---|---|---|---|---|---|---|---|
| Willem II | 2020–21 | Eredivisie | 21 | 0 | 1 | 0 | 0 | 0 | — | | 22 | 0 |
| Willem II | 2021–22 | Eredivisie | 5 | 1 | 0 | 0 | — | | 0 | 0 | 5 | 1 |
| Willem II | 2022–23 | Eerste Divisie | 9 | 0 | 0 | 0 | — | | 1 (Note: Appearances in Eredivisie promotion/relegation playoffs) | 0 | 10 | 0 |
| Willem II | Total | | 35 | 1 | 1 | 0 | 0 | 0 | 1 | 0 | 37 | 1 |
| Roda JC | 2023–24 | Eerste Divisie | 27 | 1 | 1 | 0 | — | | 2 | 0 | 30 | 1 |
| Roda JC | 2024–25 | Eerste Divisie | 16 | 0 | 0 | 0 | — | | — | | 16 | 0 |
| Roda JC | Total | | 43 | 1 | 1 | 0 | — | | 2 | 0 | 46 | 1 |
| Career total | | | 78 | 2 | 2 | 0 | 0 | 0 | 3 | 0 | 83 | 2 |
