= Bart Nieuwkoop =

Dutch footballer (born 1996)

- Nieuwkoop with Feyenoord in 2025

Personal information
- Date of birth: 7 March 1996 (age 30)
- Place of birth: Bergen op Zoom, Netherlands
- Height: 1.81 m (5 ft 11 in)
- Position: Right-back

Team information
- Current team: Feyenoord
- Number: 2

Youth career
- –2011: RBC Roosendaal
- 2011–2015: Feyenoord

Senior career*
Years	Team	Apps	(Gls)
2015–2021	Feyenoord	60	(0)
2019–2020	→ Willem II (loan)	17	(0)
2021–2023	Union SG	75	(7)
2023–	Feyenoord	47	(2)

International career
2012–2013	Netherlands U17	6	(0)
2013	Netherlands U18	3	(0)
2014–2015	Netherlands U19	8	(1)
2015–2016	Netherlands U20	5	(0)
2018	Netherlands U21	1	(0)
- * Club domestic league appearances and goals as of 16:26, 15 March 2026 (UTC)

Bart Nieuwkoop (born 7 March 1996) is a Dutch professional footballer who plays mainly as a right-back for Eredivisie club Feyenoord.

== Club career ==
Nieuwkoop played in the academy of Tholense Boys (nl) before joining the academy of RBC Roosendaal.

=== Feyenoord ===
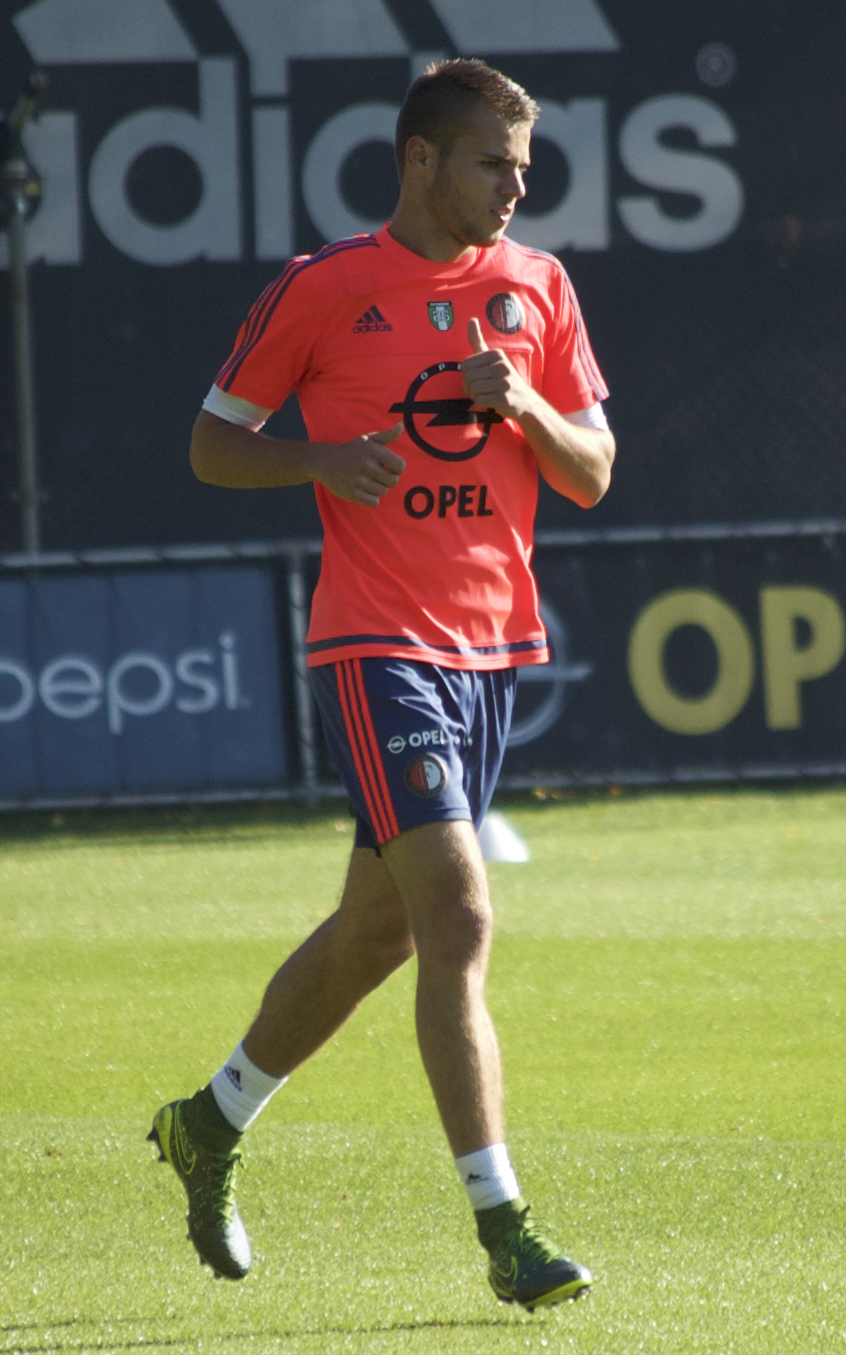
Nieuwkoop with Feyenoord in 2015 during training

In 2011, Nieuwkoop joined the academy of Feyenoord, where he signed his first professional, three-year contract in April 2014. He made his first-team debut on 4 October 2015 against De Graafschap starting in the first eleven and was replaced after 68 minutes by Tonny Vilhena. On 16 November 2015, Nieuwkoop extended his Feyenoord contract with three years, to mid-2020. Having played as a midfielder in the academy, he was mostly used as a right-back at the first team. On 24 April 2016, Feyenoord beat FC Utrecht 2–1 in the final to win the KNVB Cup, but Nieuwkoop did not play in the competition. Nieuwkoop made his European debut on 15 September 2016, getting subbed on for Rick Karsdorp in injury-time of a 1–0 win against Manchester United in the UEFA Europa League group stage. He made just one appearance in the first half of the 2016–17 Eredivisie season, but started six of Feyenoord's final seven matches as Feyenoord won the league title for the first time in 18 years. In the deciding 3–1 win against Heracles Almelo on 14 May 2017, he gave the assist for the first-minute goal of Dirk Kuyt with a throw-in.

Ahead of the 2017–18 season, Nieuwkoop changed his squad number from 26 to 2 after the departure of Karsdorp. He missed the first part of the new season, including the won Johan Cruyff Shield against Vitesse, due to an injury, gaining competition for the right-back position from Kevin Diks, Sofyan Amrabat and Jeremiah St. Juste. He made his UEFA Champions League debut on 17 October 2021, starting in Feyenoord's 1–2 defeat against Shakhtar Donetsk. Feyenoord won the 2017–18 KNVB Cup, beating AZ 3–0 in the final on 22 April 2018 with Nieuwkoop as an unused substitute. On 4 August 2018, Nieuwkoop was subbed on for the final minutes in the Johan Cruyff Shield against PSV. Feyenoord went on to win the game after a penalty shoot-out. In August 2019, he extended his contract at Feyenoord with a year, to 2021, with a club option to extend the contract with another year.

==== Loan to Willem II ====
In August 2019, Nieuwkoop was loaned out to Eredivisie side Willem II for the 2019–20 season to get more playing time. He made his debut for Willem II on 21 September 2019, replacing Miquel Nelom during a 1–0 league win against VVV-Venlo. He established himself as a regular starter before the Eredivisie was suspended and eventually abandoned due to the COVID-19 pandemic. Willem II finished the Eredivisie season in fifth place, its best finish in 21 years.

==== Return from loan spell ====
Nieuwkoop played for Feyenoord after his return from loan on 12 September 2020 as Feyenoord beat PEC Zwolle 0–2 in the Eredivisie. He missed the final three months of the season due to a hamstring injury. Feyenoord finished the season in fifth place, its worst finish in ten years, and won the European competition play-offs.

=== Union SG ===
On 30 April 2021, it was announced that Nieuwkoop had signed a three-year contract with Union Saint-Gilloise, recently promoted to the Belgian Pro League as champions of the First Division B, on a free transfer. Nieuwkoop made his debut for Union Saint-Gilloise on 25 July 2021, replacing Guillaume François during a 1–3 league win against Anderlecht. On 6 November 2021, he scored his first goal in professional football as Union Saint-Gilloise beat Charleroi 4–0. The club finished the regular season five points clear on top of the league, but finished in second place after the play-offs, in which Nieuwkoop scored against Anderlecht. On 2 August 2022, Nieuwkoop made his European debut for Union Saint-Gilloise as the club beat Rangers 2–0 in the UEFA Champions League third qualifying round. He scored the only goal in the first leg of the semi-finals of the Belgian Cup against Antwerp on 1 February 2023. On 2 March 2023, Union Saint-Gilloise lost the tie on penalties despite Nieuwkoop scoring his penalty. The club finished in third place in the Belgian Pro League and got knocked out of the UEFA Europa League quarter-finals by Bayer Leverkusen.

=== Return to Feyenoord ===
On 10 August 2023, Feyenoord announced that Nieuwkoop would return to the club on a four-year contract. Three days later, he made his return debut, starting in Feyenoord's opening match of the 2023–24 Eredivisie season, a 0–0 home draw against Fortuna Sittard. Nieuwkoop's return to De Kuip did not unfold as anticipated, after being sent off in the 25th minute due to stepping on Iñigo Córdoba's ankle, for which he got suspended for two league games. On 4 November 2023, Nieuwkoop scored his first goal for the club in a 2–1 away win against RKC Waalwijk, scoring the final goal of the match. He started playing some matches as a right winger rather than as a right-back. Head coach Arne Slot explained that Nieuwkoop went deep and had fanaticism and enthusiasm. On 18 February 2024, he was subbed on for Thomas Beelen at half-time to play his hundredth official game for Feyenoord, a 1–0 league win against RKC Waalwijk. He started in the final as Feyenoord beat NEC 1–0 to win the KNVB Cup on 21 April 2024.

On 4 August 2024, Nieuwkoop scored as Feyenoord won the Johan Cruyff Shield, beating PSV Eindhoven on penalties. During the remainder of the 2024–25 season, Nieuwkoop struggled with injuries.

== International career ==
Nieuwkoop made his debut for the Netherlands under-17 on 25 October 2012, replacing Stijn Spierings during a goalless draw against Lithuania in the 2013 UEFA Euro qualifiers. He later played for the Netherlands at under-18, under-19 and under-20 level. On 11 October 2014, he scored for the under-19 team in a 3–0 win against Moldova in the 2015 UEFA Euro qualifiers. Nieuwkoop played his only game for the Netherlands under-21 on 22 March 2018, as a substitute for Denzel Dumfries at half-time of a 1–4 friendly defeat against Belgium.

== Career statistics ==
=== Club ===
As of match played 15 March 2026

Appearances and goals by club, season and competition
Club	Season	League			National Cup		Europe		Other		Total	
Club	Season	Division	Apps	Goals	Apps	Goals	Apps	Goals	Apps	Goals	Apps	Goals
Feyenoord	2015–16	Eredivisie	5	0	0	0	0	0	—		5	0
Feyenoord	2016–17	Eredivisie	13	0	1	0	2 (Note: Appearances in UEFA Europa League)	0	–		16	0
Feyenoord	2017–18	Eredivisie	14	0	3	0	4 (Note: Appearances in UEFA Champions League)	0	0	0	21	0
Feyenoord	2018–19	Eredivisie	13	0	3	0	2	0	1 (Note: Appearance in Johan Cruyff Shield)	0	19	0
Feyenoord	2019–20	Eredivisie	—		—		1	0	—		1	0
Feyenoord	2020–21	Eredivisie	15	0	1	0	3	0	—		19	0
Feyenoord	Total		60	0	8	0	12	0	1	0	81	0
Willem II (loan)	2019–20	Eredivisie	17	0	3	0	—		—		20	0
Union SG	2021–22	Belgian Pro League	38	4	1	0	—		—		39	4
Union SG	2022–23	Belgian Pro League	35	3	5	1	11 (Note: Appearances in UEFA Champions League and UEFA Europa League)	0	—		51	4
Union SG	2023–24	Belgian Pro League	2	0	0	0	0	0	—		2	0
Union SG	Total		75	7	6	1	11	0	0	0	92	8
Feyenoord	2023–24	Eredivisie	21	1	4	1	5	0	0	0	30	2
Feyenoord	2024–25	Eredivisie	10	0	0	0	5	0	1	1	16	1
Feyenoord	2025–26	Eredivisie	16	1	0	0	6	0	—		22	1
Feyenoord	Total		47	2	4	1	16	0	1	1	68	4
Career total			199	9	21	2	39	0	2	1	262	12

== Personal life ==
Nieuwkoop was born in Bergen op Zoom on 7 March 1996. He is a son of a father and his mother Petra Nieuwkoop and a brother of Sam and Koen Nieuwkoop. He grew up in Tholen and later started living in Bergen op Zoom and Rotterdam with his girlfriend Susan den Houting. He called himself a "family man". Nieuwkoop played tennis for a few years as a kid and worked as a dishwasher before playing for Feyenoord. His daughter Zoé Nieuwkoop was born on 9 September 2020.

== Honours ==
Feyenoord

- Eredivisie: 2016–17
- KNVB Cup: 2015–16, 2017–18, 2023–24
- Johan Cruijff Shield: 2017, 2018, 2024
