= Vincent Schippers =

Dutch footballer

Personal information
- Date of birth: 4 March 2001 (age 25)
- Place of birth: Vlaardingen, Netherlands
- Height: 1.82 m (6 ft 0 in)
- Position: Right-back

Team information
- Current team: VV Capelle

Senior career*
Years	Team	Apps	(Gls)
2019–2020	Sparta Rotterdam	2	(0)
2020–2022	Willem II	9	(0)
2022–2023	Dordrecht	24	(1)
2023–2024	Excelsior Maassluis	25	(4)
2024–	VV Capelle		

International career
2016–2017	Netherlands U16	5	(0)
2018	Netherlands U18	4	(0)
- * Club domestic league appearances and goals as of 16 November 2024

Vincent Schippers (born 4 March 2001) is a Dutch professional footballer who plays as a right-back for VV Capelle.

== Club career ==
A youth product of Sparta Rotterdam, Schippers signed with Schippers made his professional debut with Willem II in a 4-1 Eredivisie loss to Feyenoord on 4 October 2020.

On 10 August 2022, Schippers signed a two-year contract with Dordrecht.
