= Rick Zuijderwijk =

Dutch footballer (born 2001)

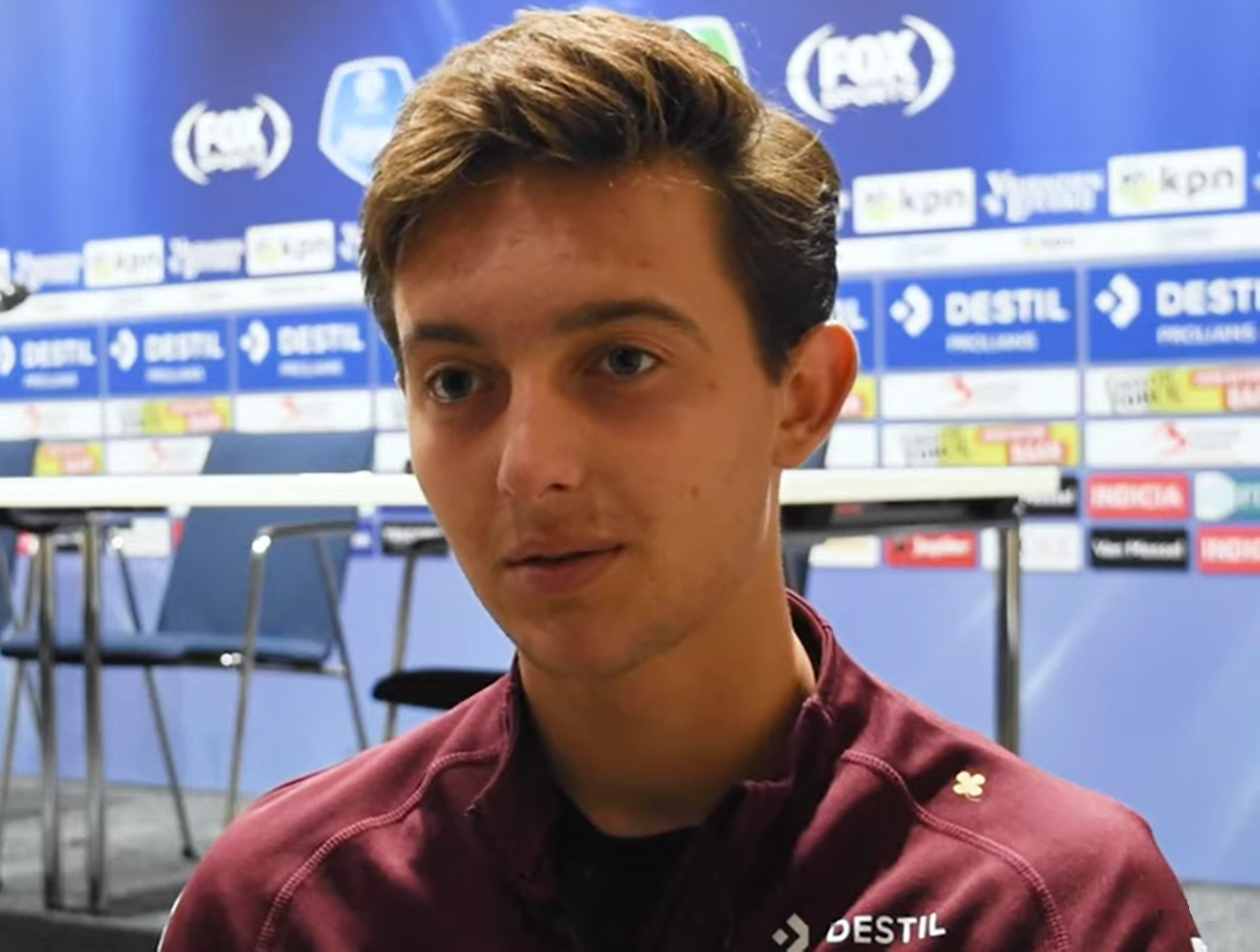

Personal information
- Date of birth: 13 April 2001 (age 25)
- Place of birth: Breda, Netherlands
- Height: 1.76 m (5 ft 9 in)
- Position: Midfielder

Youth career
- 2010–2019: Willem II

Senior career*
Years	Team	Apps	(Gls)
2019–2022	Willem II	7	(0)
2021	→ Den Bosch (loan)	4	(0)
- * Club domestic league appearances and goals as of 19:52, 9 March 2023 (UTC)

Rick Zuijderwijk (born 13 April 2001) is a Dutch professional footballer who plays as a midfielder. A free agent, he most recently played for Willem II.

== Club career ==
Zuijderwijk joined the Willem II academy in 2010. He made his professional debut with Willem II in a 2–0 Eredivisie loss to SBV Vitesse on 10 August 2019.

On 31 August 2021, he joined FC Den Bosch on loan for the 2021–22 season. In January 2022 he returned to Willem II.

Zuijderwijk's contract with Willem II was terminated by mutual consent on 31 August 2022, making him a free agent.
