= Ché Nunnely =

Surinamese footballer (born 1999)

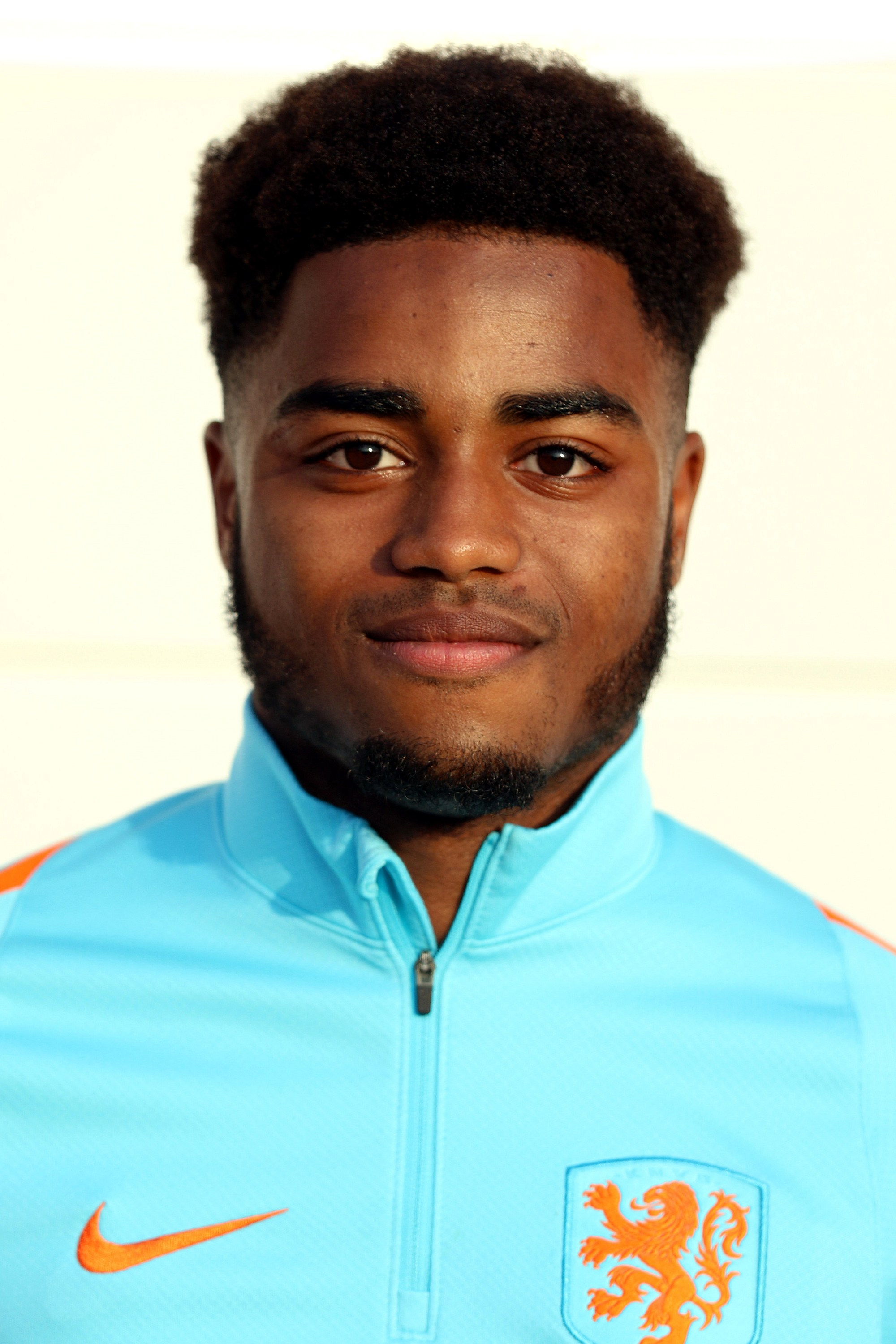
- Nunnely with the Netherlands U18 in March 2017

Personal information
- Full name: Ché-fyr Elesse Nunnely
- Date of birth: 4 February 1999 (age 27)
- Place of birth: Almere, Netherlands
- Height: 1.64 m (5 ft 5 in)
- Position: Winger

Team information
- Current team: Radomiak Radom
- Number: 7

Youth career
- –2009: Almere City
- 2009–2013: Utrecht
- 2012–2019: Ajax

Senior career*
Years	Team	Apps	(Gls)
2016–2019	Jong Ajax	42	(10)
2019–2022	Willem II	88	(17)
2023–2025	Heerenveen	61	(3)
2025–2026	Panserraikos	12	(1)
2026	A.E. Kifisia	12	(0)
2026–	Radomiak Radom	7	(0)

International career^{‡}
2013–2014	Netherlands U15	5	(3)
2014–2015	Netherlands U16	11	(1)
2015–2016	Netherlands U17	13	(2)
2016–2017	Netherlands U18	7	(2)
2017–2018	Netherlands U19	14	(3)
2018–2019	Netherlands U20	12	(0)
2026–	Suriname	2	(0)
- * Club domestic league appearances and goals as of 08:14, 29 September 2026 (UTC) ‡ National team caps and goals as of 21:08, 3 October 2026 (UTC)

Ché-fyr Elesse Nunnely (born 4 February 1999) is a professional footballer who plays as a right winger for Ekstraklasa club Radomiak Radom. Born in the Netherlands, he plays for the Suriname national team.

== Club career ==
=== Ajax ===
Nunnely joined the Ajax Youth Academy form the youth ranks of FC Utrecht in 2012. From the age of 16 he was a permanent fixture in the clubs' A1 selection, the under-19 team, having won the U19 national championship on three occasions (2018–19, 2016–17, 2015–16). He made his professional debut in the Eerste Divisie for Jong Ajax on 13 January 2017 in a game against FC Emmen. Unable to break into the first team, Nunnely transferred to Willem II having played two seasons for the reserves team Jong Ajax, amassing 42 caps while scoring 10 goals and helping his side to win the 2017–18 Eerste Divisie title.

=== Willem II ===
On 19 June 2019, it was announced that Nunnely had signed a three-year contract with Eredivisie side Willem II. He made his debut on 2 August in a 3–1 away win over PEC Zwolle. On 10 November he scored his first two goals of the season in the home game against PSV, lifting his team to a 2–1 victory. For the 2019–20 season, Nunnely finished with four goals and six assists to his name, achieved in 25 league appearances.

=== Heerenveen ===
On 19 January 2023, Nunnely joined Heerenveen on a contract until the end of the season, with an option for a further two years. On 4 February, he debuted for the club against FC Utrecht as a substitute in the 70th minute, being 1–0 down. Two minutes before full-time, he scored the equalizer, but his goal was ruled out due to offside.

On 31 March, the club option for his contract was activated automatically: as a result, Nunnely's deal with Heerenveen was extended until June 2025.

== International career ==
Born in the Netherlands, Nunnely is of Afro-Surinamese descent. Nunnely was part of various Dutch national youth selections. He reached the semifinals at the 2016 UEFA European Under-17 Championship with the Netherlands U17. He also reached the semifinals of the 2017 UEFA European Under-19 Championship with the Netherlands U19 as well. Both times they were eliminated by Portugal.

On 25 September 2026, Nunnely's request to switch international allegiance to Suriname was approved by FIFA. He made his debut for Suriname three days later, starting in a 2–1 win over Martinique in the CONCACAF Nations League.

== Career statistics ==
=== International ===
As of match played 2 October 2026

Appearances and goals by national team and year
National team	Year	Apps	Goals
Suriname
Suriname	2026	2	0
Total		2	0

== Honours ==
Jong Ajax

- Eerste Divisie: 2017–18
