= 2024–25 FC Groningen season =

FC Groningen
2024–25 season
- Chairman: Jakob Klompien
- Manager: Dick Lukkien
- Stadium: Euroborg
- Eredivisie: 13th
- KNVB Cup: 2nd round
- Top goalscorer: League: Stije Resink (5 goals); All: Stije Resink (6 goals)
- Highest home attendance: 22,525 (SC Heerenveen 20th week & FC Twente 24th week & PSV Eindhoven 28th week & Heracles Almelo 30th week & RKC Waalwijk 31st week & AFC Ajax 33rd week)
- Lowest home attendance: 21,306 (NAC Breda 1st week)
- Average home league attendance: 22,241
- Biggest win: 6-1 (RKC Waalwijk (h) 31st week)
- Biggest defeat: 6-0 (NEC Nijmegen (a) 11th week)
- All statistics correct as of 18 May 2025.

The 2024–25 season is FC Groningen's 54th season in existence and 45th in the Eredivisie.

The club competed also in the KNVB Cup. FC Groningen lost 3-1 against AZ Alkmaar in the 2nd round of KNVB Cup and eliminated from the cup.

Stije Resink was the top scorer of the club in this season with 6 goals, 5 goals in Eredivisie and 1 goal in KNVB Cup.

Thom van Bergen was the most appeared player in this season with 36 appearances; 34 appearances in the Eredivisie and 2 appearances in the KNVB Cup.

== Players ==
=== First-team squad ===
As of 23 January 2025

Note: Flags indicate national team as defined under FIFA eligibility rules; some limited exceptions apply. Players may hold more than one non-FIFA nationality.

No.	Pos.	Nation	Player
1	GK	SUR	Etienne Vaessen
2	DF	NED	Wouter Prins
3	DF	NED	Thijmen Blokzijl
4	DF	SWE	Hjalmar Ekdal
5	DF	GER	Marco Rente
6	MF	NED	Stije Resink
7	MF	CUW	Leandro Bacuna (captain)
8	MF	NOR	Johan Hove
9	MF	ISL	Brynjólfur Willumsson
10	MF	ITA	Luciano Valente
11	FW	FRA	Noam Emeran
14	MF	NED	Jorg Schreuders
16	MF	NED	Dave Kwakman
18	MF	NED	Tika de Jonge
20	MF	NED	Mats Seuntjens
21	GK	NED	Hidde Jurjus
22	DF	NED	Finn Stam

No.	Pos.	Nation	Player
23	FW	NED	Fofin Turay
24	GK	NED	Dirk Baron
25	FW	NED	Thijs Oosting
26	FW	NED	Thom van Bergen
27	FW	POR	Rui Mendes
29	FW	NED	Romano Postema
31	GK	NED	Jasper Meijster
33	FW	SWE	Alex Mortensen
36	DF	NED	Maxim Mariani
43	DF	BEL	Marvin Peersman
44	GK	NED	Jasper Meijster
56	DF	NED	Marco Speelman
57	MF	NED	Nils Eggens
67	DF	NED	Sven Bouland
70	DF	NED	Roy Leicester
99	FW	NED	Kevin van Veen

== Transfers ==
=== In ===
Pos.	Player	Transferred from	Fee	Date
FW	(Germany) Florian Krüger	(Germany) Eintracht Braunschweig	End of loan	30 June 2024
FW	(Netherlands) Kevin van Veen	(Scotland) Kilmarnock F.C.	End of loan	30 June 2024
MF	(Indonesia) Ragnar Oratmangoen	(Netherlands) Fortuna Sittard	End of loan	30 June 2024
MF	(Iceland) Brynjólfur Willumsson	(Norway) Kristiansund BK	€75,000	1 July 2024
GK	(Suriname) Etienne Vaessen	(Netherlands) RKC Waalwijk	Free	1 July 2024
DF	(Netherlands) Sven Bouland	(Netherlands) FC Groningen U21	Free	1 July 2024
DF	(Netherlands) Finn Stam	(Netherlands) AZ Alkmaar	On loan	10 July 2024
FW	(Netherlands) Thijs Oosting	(Netherlands) Willem II	€1,000,000	2 July 2024
MF	(Netherlands) Stije Resink	(Netherlands) Almere City FC	€700,000	20 August 2024
MF	(Netherlands) Kevin van Veen	(Scotland) St Mirren F.C.	End of loan	5 November 2024
MF	(Netherlands) David van der Werff	(Netherlands) FC Groningen U21	Free	23 December 2024
MF	(Norway) Kristian Lien	(Norway) Kristiansund BK	End of loan	31 December 2024
FW	(Sweden) Paulos Abraham	(Sweden) IFK Göteborg	End of loan	31 December 2024
MF	(Netherlands) Mats Seuntjens	(Spain) CD Castellón	Free	3 January 2025
MF	(Netherlands) Dave Kwakman	(Netherlands) AZ Alkmaar	On loan	20 January 2025
DF	(Sweden) Hjalmar Ekdal	(England) Burnley F.C.	On loan	23 January 2025

=== Out ===
Pos.	Player	Transferred to	Fee	Date
DF	(Netherlands) Daniël Beukers	(Netherlands) FC Volendam	Free	1 July 2024
GK	(Netherlands) Dirk Baron		Free	1 July 2024
DF	(Netherlands) Nick Bakker		Free	1 July 2024
MF	(Netherlands) Steyn Potma	(Netherlands) SC Cambuur	Free	1 July 2024
MF	(Norway) Isak Dybvik Määttä	(Norway) FK Bodø/Glimt	€600,000	17 July 2024
FW	(Norway) Kristian Lien	(Norway) Kristiansund BK	On loan	26 July 2024
FW	(Indonesia) Ragnar Oratmangoen	(Belgium) F.C.V. Dender E.H.	Free	13 August 2024
MF	(Cape Verde) Laros Duarte	(Hungary) Puskás Akadémia FC	€875,000	23 August 2024
FW	(Germany) Florian Krüger	(Belgium) K Beerschot VA	€275,000	6 September 2024
MF	(Netherlands) Joey Pelupessy	(Belgium) Lommel S.K.		3 January 2025
FW	(Sweden) Paulos Abraham	(Sweden) Hammarby Fotboll	€1,300,000	29 January 2025

== Pre-season and friendlies ==
3 July 2024 Friendly	VV GOMOS	0–9	Groningen	Norg
			Tika de Jonge; Kristian Strømland Lien; Nils Eggens; Rui Mendes; Noam Emeran; Laros Duarte	Stadium: Sportpark Schapendrift

6 July 2024 Friendly	VV ASVB	0–15	FC Groningen	Blijham
			Thijs Oosting; Luciano Valente; Kristian Strømland Lien; Thom van Bergen; Brynjólfur Willumsson; Johan Hove; Romano Postema; Leandro Bacuna; Noam Emeran	Stadium: Sportpark Schapendrift

10 July 2024 Friendly	FC Groningen	4–4	F.C.V. Dender E.H.	Groningen
13:00	Leandro Bacuna; Johan Hove; Kristian Strømland Lien; Maxim Mariani

13 July 2024 Friendly	FC Groningen	1–0	FC Rot-Weiß Erfurt	Leek
15:00	Leandro Bacuna			Attendance: 2,750

20 July 2024 Friendly	FC Groningen	3–2	FC Emmen	Rolde
14:30	Romano Postema 22' (pen.); Nils Eggens 102' 107'	Report	Jalen Hawkins 20'; Franck Evina 50'	Stadium: Sportpark Boerbos

== Competitions ==
=== Overall record ===
Competition	First match	Last match	Starting round	Record							
Competition	First match	Last match	Starting round	Pld	W	D	L	GF	GA	GD	Win %
Eredivisie	9 August 2024	18 May 2025	Week 1	34	10	9	15	40	53	−13	29.41
KNVB Cup	29 October 2024	18 December 2024	1st Round	2	1	0	1	6	4	+2	50.00
Total				36	11	9	16	46	57	−11	30.56

Source: ESPN

=== Eredivisie ===
==== League table ====
Pos	Team	Pld	W	D	L	GF	GA	GD	Pts
11	Fortuna Sittard	34	11	8	15	37	54	−17	41
12	Sparta Rotterdam	34	9	12	13	39	43	−4	39
13	Groningen	34	10	9	15	40	53	−13	39
14	Heracles Almelo	34	9	11	14	42	63	−21	38
15	NAC Breda	34	8	9	17	34	58	−24	33

Source: Eredivisie
Rules for classification: 1) Points; 2) Goal difference; 3) Goals scored; 4) Head-to-head points; 5) Head-to-head goal difference; 6) Head-to-head away goals scored; 7) Play-off if relevant for deciding champion, relegation or participating in a European league, otherwise by draw. 8) Penalty shoot-out (only after a play-off)

==== Results summary ====
Overall								Home						Away					
Pld	W	D	L	GF	GA	GD	Pts	W	D	L	GF	GA	GD	W	D	L	GF	GA	GD
34	10	9	15	40	53	−13	39	8	6	3	27	14	+13	2	3	12	13	39	−26

Source: https://www.espn.nl/voetbal/stand/_/competitie/ned.1

==== Results by round ====
Round	1	2	3	4	5	6	7	8	9	10	11	12	13	14	15	16	17	18	19	20	21	22	23	24	25	26	27	28	29	30	31	32	33	34
Ground	H	A	H	A	H	A	H	A	H	A	A	H	A	H	H	A	A	H	A	H	A	H	A	H	A	H	A	H	A	H	H	A	H	A
Result	W	W	D	D	D	L	L	L	L	L	L	W	L	W	D	L	D	D	L	W	L	W	W	D	L	W	D	L	L	W	W	L	D	L
Position	2	3	2	4	4	6	9		13	14	15	13	15	13	15	14		13	15	15		15	8	10		9	8	11	13	11		11	12	13

Source: ESPN
A = Away; H = Home; W = Win; D = Draw; L = Loss

=== Matches ===
==== 1st half ====
9 August 2024 Week 1	FC Groningen	4–1	NAC Breda	Groningen
20:00	Leandro Bacuna 8' (pen.); Rui Mendes 25'; Marco Rente 31'; Jorg Schreuders 68'	Report	Dominik Janosek 48' (pen.)	Stadium: Euroborg; Attendance: 21,306; Referee: Marc Nagtegaal

17 August 2024 Week 2	RKC Waalwijk	1–2	FC Groningen	Waalwijk
21:00	Richard van der Venne 89'	Report	Jorg Schreuders 11'; Thom van Bergen 77'	Stadium: Mandemakers Stadion; Attendance: 6,492; Referee: Robin Hensgens

25 August 2024 Week 3	FC Groningen	0–0	AZ Alkmaar	Groningen
12:15		Report		Stadium: Euroborg; Attendance: 21,981; Referee: Jeroen Manschot

31 August 2024 Week 4	Almere City FC	1–1	FC Groningen	Almere
16:30	Baptiste Guillaume 8'	Report	Leandro Bacuna 67'	Stadium: Yanmar Stadion; Attendance: 4,222; Referee: Martijn Vos

14 September 2024 Week 5	FC Groningen	2–2	Feyenoord	Groningen
18:45	Brynjólfur Willumsson 81' 90+1'	Report	Thom van Bergen 33' (o.g.); Igor Paixão 70'	Stadium: Euroborg; Attendance: 22,525; Referee: Danny Makkelie

22 September 2024 Week 6	SC Heerenveen	2–1	FC Groningen	Heerenveen
12:15	Jacob Trenskow 12'; Ion Nicolaescu 69'	Report	Luciano Valente 9'	Stadium: Abe Lenstra Stadion; Attendance: 23,729; Referee: Dennis Higler

29 September 2024 Week 7	FC Groningen	0–1	Go Ahead Eagles	Groningen
14:30		Report	Oliver Valaker Edvardsen 75'	Stadium: Euroborg; Attendance: 22,040; Referee: Rob Dieperink

6 October 2024 Week 8	AFC Ajax	3–1	FC Groningen	Amsterdam
16:45	Davy Klaassen 21'; Wout Weghorst 90+1'; Chuba Akpom 90+4'	Report	Jorg Schreuders 69'	Stadium: Johan Cruyff Arena; Attendance: 53,984; Referee: Allard Lindhout

20 October 2024 Week 9	FC Groningen	0–1	FC Utrecht	Groningen
14:30		Report	Yoann Cathline 20'	Stadium: Euroborg; Attendance: 22,160; Referee: Serdar Gözübüyük

26 October 2024 Week 10	Fortuna Sittard	1–0	FC Groningen	Sittard
16:30	Leandro Bacuna 86' (o.g.)	Report		Stadium: Fortuna Sittard Stadion; Attendance: 11,267; Referee: Erwin Blank

3 November 2024 Week 11	NEC Nijmegen	6–0	FC Groningen	Nijmegen
14:30	Kōki Ogawa 6' (pen.) 26'; Sontje Hansen 32'; Vito van Crooij 52'; Sami Ouaissa 74'; Thomas Ouwejan 86'	Report		Stadium: Goffertstadion; Attendance: 12,540; Referee: Martijn Vos

9 November 2024 Week 12	FC Groningen	1–0	Sparta Rotterdam	Groningen
16:30	Romano Postema 31'	Report		Stadium: Euroborg; Attendance: 21,995; Referee: Danny Makkelie

23 November 2024 Week 13	PSV Eindhoven	5–0	FC Groningen	Eindhoven
21:00	Olivier Boscagli 14'; Ricardo Pepi 37' 64' 78'; Guus Til 52'	Report		Stadium: Philips Stadion; Attendance: 33,200; Referee: Joey Kooij

30 November 2024 Week 14	FC Groningen	2–0	Willem II	Groningen
18:45	Thijs Oosting 32'; Stije Resink 59'	Report		Stadium: Euroborg; Attendance: 22,136; Referee: Marc Nagtegaal

10 December 2024 Week 15	FC Groningen	0–0	PEC Zwolle	Groningen
12:15		Report		Stadium: Euroborg; Attendance: 22,165; Referee: Jeroen Manschot

15 December 2024 Week 16	FC Twente	2–0	FC Groningen	Enschede
14:30	Bart van Rooij 24'; Sem Steijn 57'	Report		Stadium: De Grolsch Veste; Attendance: 29,000; Referee: Alex Bos

==== 2nd half ====
12 January 2025 Week 18	FC Groningen	0–0	Almere City FC	Groningen
14:30		Report		Stadium: Euroborg; Attendance: 22,122; Referee: Erwin Blank

18 January 2025 Week 19	Go Ahead Eagles	2–1	FC Groningen	Deventer
21:00	Oliver Antman 5'; Milan Smit 90+1'	Report	Brynjólfur Willumsson 31'	Stadium: De Adelaarshorst; Attendance: 9,997; Referee: Serdar Gözübüyük

25 January 2025 Week 20	FC Groningen	1–0	SC Heerenveen	Groningen
21:00	Luciano Valente 63'	Report		Stadium: Euroborg; Attendance: 22,525; Referee: Danny Makkelie

28 January 2025 Week 17	Heracles Almelo	1–1 (Note: The match was abandoned in the 79th minute on December 21st, 2024 due to incidents in the stands. Last 11 minutes of the game is played on January 28th, 2025 without away fans.)	FC Groningen	Almelo
20:00	Luka Kulenović 20'	Report	Romano Postema 50' (pen.)	Stadium: Erve Asito; Attendance: 5,128; Referee: Rob Dieperink

2 February 2025 Week 21	Sparta Rotterdam	1–0	FC Groningen	Rotterdam
16:45	Tobias Lauritsen 60'	Report		Stadium: Het Kasteel; Attendance: 9,588; Referee: Alex Bos

8 February 2025 Week 22	FC Groningen	2–1	NEC Nijmegen	Groningen
20:00	Wouter Prins 2'; Thom van Bergen 31'	Report	Vito van Crooij 66'	Stadium: Euroborg; Attendance: 22,116; Referee: Martin van den Kerkhof

15 February 2025 Week 23	Willem II	1–3	FC Groningen	Tilburg
21:00	Jesse Bosch 49'	Report	Dave Kwakman 5'; Stije Resink 17'; Tika de Jonge 21'	Stadium: Koning Willem II Stadion; Attendance: 13,800; Referee: Bas Nijhuis

1 March 2025 Week 24	FC Groningen	1–1	FC Twente	Groningen
20:00	Thom van Bergen 32'	Report	Sem Steijn 45+4' (pen.)	Stadium: Euroborg; Attendance: 22,525; Referee: Dennis Higler

16 March 2025 Week 26	FC Groningen	1–0	Fortuna Sittard	Groningen
14:30	Brynjólfur Willumsson 87'	Report		Stadium: Euroborg; Attendance: 22,403; Referee: Allard Lindhout

29 March 2025 Week 27	NAC Breda	1–1	FC Groningen	Breda
16:30	Clint Leemans 90+8' (pen.)	Report	Mats Seuntjens 54' (pen.)	Stadium: Rat Verlegh Stadion; Attendance: 18,896; Referee: Alex Bos

2 April 2025 Week 25 (Note: The match was postponed because of the Champions League game of Feyenoord.)	Feyenoord	4–1	FC Groningen	Rotterdam
20:00	Anis Hadj Moussa 10'; Igor Paixão 33' 82'; Ibrahim Osman 90'	Report	Jorg Schreuders 37'	Stadium: De Kuip; Attendance: 47,500; Referee: Marc Nagtegaal

5 April 2025 Week 28	FC Groningen	1–3	PSV Eindhoven	Groningen
20:00	Dave Kwakman 34'	Report	Malik Tillman 11'; Ivan Perišić 28'; Johan Bakayoko 88'	Stadium: Euroborg; Attendance: 22,525; Referee: Bas Nijhuis

16 April 2025 Week 29	FC Utrecht	3–1	FC Groningen	Utrecht
12:15	Souffian El Karouani 8'; Yoann Cathline 17'; Sébastien Haller 42'	Report	Stije Resink 32'	Stadium: Stadion Galgenwaard; Attendance: 22,711; Referee: Edwin van de Graaf

23 April 2025 Week 30	FC Groningen	4–1	Heracles Almelo	Groningen
20:00	Marco Rente 4'; Jorg Schreuders 16'; Leandro Bacuna 50' (pen.); Brian De Keersmaecker 59' (o.g.)	Report	Thomas Bruns 20'	Stadium: Euroborg; Attendance: 22,525; Referee: Ingmar Oostrom

3 May 2025 Week 31	FC Groningen	6–1	RKC Waalwijk	Groningen
20:00	Leandro Bacuna 7' (pen.); Stije Resink 45+2' 50'; Noam Emeran 46'; Thom van Bergen 60'; Mats Seuntjens 89'	Report	Godfried Roemeratoe 67'	Stadium: Euroborg; Attendance: 22,525; Referee: Serdar Gözübüyük

11 May 2025 Week 32	AZ Alkmaar	3–0	FC Groningen	Alkmaar
16:45	Sven Mijnans 9'; Ernest Poku 30'; Mexx Meerdink 48'	Report		Stadium: AFAS Stadion; Attendance: 17,856; Referee: Sander Van Der Eijk

14 May 2025 Week 33	FC Groningen	2–2	AFC Ajax	Groningen
20:00	Thom van Bergen 52'; Thijmen Blokzijl 90+9'	Report	Anton Gaaei 27'; Wout Weghorst 68'	Stadium: Euroborg; Attendance: 22,525; Referee: Jeroen Manschot

18 May 2025 Week 34	PEC Zwolle	2–0	FC Groningen	Zwolle
14:30	Younes Namli 44'; Dylan Mbayo 68'	Report		Stadium: MAC³PARK Stadion; Referee: Bas Nijhuis

=== KNVB Cup ===
29 October 2024 First round	VV Kolping Boys	1–5	FC Groningen	Wijdewormer
21:00	Joreno Mandjes 52'	Report	Stije Resink 6'; Rui Mendes 58'; Thijs Oosting 73' 85' 90+4'	Stadium: AFAS Trainingscomplex; Attendance: 1,200; Referee: Laurens Gerrets

18 December 2024 Second round	AZ Alkmaar	3–1	FC Groningen	Alkmaar
21:00	Sven Mijnans 4'; Ruben van Bommel 70'; Jayden Addai 84'	Report	Leandro Bacuna 41' (pen.)	Stadium: AFAS Stadion; Referee: Serdar Gözübüyük

== Statistics ==
=== Scorers ===
#	Player	Eredivisie	KNVB	Total
1	(Netherlands) Stije Resink	5	1	6
2	(Netherlands) Jorg Schreuders	5	0	5
2	(Curaçao) Leandro Bacuna	4	1	5
2	(Netherlands) Thom van Bergen	5	0	5
5	(Iceland) Brynjólfur Willumsson	4	0	4
5	(Netherlands) Thijs Oosting	1	3	4
7	(Netherlands) Dave Kwakman	2	0	2
7	(Italy) Luciano Valente	2	0	2
7	(Germany) Marco Rente	2	0	2
7	(Netherlands) Mats Seuntjens	2	0	2
7	(Netherlands) Romano Postema	2	0	2
7	(Portugal) Rui Mendes	1	1	2
13	(France) Noam Emeran	1	0	1
13	(Netherlands) Thijmen Blokzijl	1	0	1
13	(Netherlands) Tika de Jonge	1	0	1
13	(Netherlands) Wouter Prins	1	0	1

=== Assists ===
#	Player	Eredivisie	KNVB	Total
1	(Netherlands) Luciano Valente	6	1	7
2	(Netherlands) Thom van Bergen	3	1	4
3	(Curaçao) Leandro Bacuna	3	0	3
3	(Netherlands) Stije Resink	3	0	3
5	(Germany) Marco Rente	1	1	2
5	(Belgium) Marvin Peersman	2	0	2
5	(Netherlands) Mats Seuntjens	2	0	2
8	(Iceland) Brynjólfur Willumsson	1	0	1
8	(Netherlands) Finn Stam	1	0	1
8	(Netherlands) Joey Pelupessy	1	0	1
8	(Netherlands) Jorg Schreuders	1	0	1
8	(Netherlands) Romano Postema	0	1	1
8	(Portugal) Rui Mendes	1	0	1
8	(Netherlands) Tika de Jonge	1	0	1
8	(Netherlands) Wouter Prins	1	0	1

=== Appearances ===
#	Player	Eredivisie	KNVB	Total
1	(Netherlands) Thom van Bergen	34	2	36
2	(Netherlands) Jorg Schreuders	32	2	34
3	(Curaçao) Leandro Bacuna	31	2	33
3	(Netherlands) Luciano Valente	32	1	33
5	(Suriname) Etienne Vaessen	32	0	32
5	(Germany) Marco Rente	30	2	32
7	(Netherlands) Romano Postema	29	2	31
8	(Iceland) Brynjólfur Willumsson	29	1	30
8	(Netherlands) Thijmen Blokzijl	28	2	30
10	(Netherlands) Wouter Prins	26	2	28
11	(Belgium) Marvin Peersman	26	1	27
11	(Netherlands) Stije Resink	26	1	27
13	(Netherlands) Thijs Oosting	22	2	24
14	(Norway) Johan Hove	20	2	22
15	(Netherlands) Tika de Jonge	21	0	21
15	(Netherlands) Finn Stam	19	1	20
17	(Portugal) Rui Mendes	14	2	16
18	(Netherlands) Dave Kwakman	15	0	15
18	(Netherlands) Joey Pelupessy	13	2	15
20	(Sweden) Hjalmar Ekdal	14	0	14
21	(Netherlands) Mats Seuntjens	13	0	13
22	(France) Noam Emeran	4	1	5
23	(Netherlands) Hidde Jurjus	2	2	4
24	(Netherlands) David van der Werf	2	1	3
25	(Sweden) Alex Mortensen	2	0	2
25	(Netherlands) Maxim Mariani	2	0	2
25	(Netherlands) Sven Bouland	2	0	2
28	(Netherlands) Fofin Turay	1	0	1
28	(Cape Verde) Laros Duarte	1	0	1

=== Clean sheets ===
#	Player	Eredivisie
1	(Suriname) Etienne Vaessen	7
Total		7

=== Disciplinary record ===
#	Player	Eredivisie		KNVB		Total	
#	Player	Yellow card	Red card	Yellow card	Red card	Yellow card	Red card
1	(Belgium) Marvin Peersman	7	1	0	0	7	1
2	(Italy) Luciano Valente	4	1	0	0	4	1
3	(Iceland) Brynjólfur Willumsson	3	1	0	0	3	1
4	(Germany) Marco Rente	2	1	0	0	2	1
5	(Netherlands) Thijmen Blokzijl	1	1	0	0	1	1
5	(Netherlands) Tika de Jonge	1	1	0	0	1	1
7	(Curaçao) Leandro Bacuna	8	0	0	0	8	0
8	(Netherlands) Stije Resink	6	0	0	0	6	0
9	(Suriname) Etienne Vaessen	4	0	0	0	4	0
9	(Netherlands) Thom van Bergen	4	0	0	0	4	0
11	(Netherlands) Finn Stam	3	0	0	0	3	0
11	(Portugal) Rui Mendes	3	0	0	0	3	0
13	(Sweden) Hjalmar Ekdal	2	0	0	0	2	0
13	(Netherlands) Jorg Schreuders	2	0	0	0	2	0
13	(Netherlands) Romano Postema	2	0	0	0	2	0
13	(Netherlands) Wouter Prins	2	0	0	0	2	0
20	(Netherlands) Mats Seuntjens	1	0	0	0	1	0
