= Marvin Peersman =

Belgian footballer (born 1991)

- Peersman with Telstar in 2026

Personal information
- Date of birth: 10 February 1991 (age 35)
- Place of birth: Wilrijk, Belgium
- Height: 1.85 m (6 ft 1 in)
- Positions: Left-back; centre-back

Team information
- Current team: Telstar
- Number: 43

Youth career
- Sint-Anneke Sport
- Germinal Beerschot

Senior career*
Years	Team	Apps	(Gls)
2009–2010	Beveren	20	(0)
2010–2012	Royal Antwerp	44	(0)
2012–2015	Dordrecht	81	(1)
2015–2018	Cambuur	82	(1)
2018–2020	Hapoel Tel Aviv	79	(1)
2020–2022	PAS Giannina	56	(2)
2022–2023	Aris	29	(0)
2023–2026	Groningen	96	(6)
2026–	Telstar	0	(0)

International career
2009–2010	Belgium U19	6	(0)
- * Club domestic league appearances and goals as of 19 May 2026

Marvin Peersman (born 10 February 1991) is a Belgian professional footballer who plays as a left-back for Eredivisie club Telstar.

== Club career ==
Peersman began his professional football club career in 2009 at Beveren as a 17-year-old before signing for Royal Antwerp in 2010 and in 2012 Peersman signed for FC Dordrecht. After that, he played for Cambuur and Hapoel Tel Aviv in Israel.

He signed a contract with PAS Giannina on 7 August 2020. On 30 January 2022, he scored his first goal with the club in all competitions in a 2–0 home win game against Apollon Smyrnis. He was voted man of the match for his performance.

In summer 2022 he signed for Aris.

=== Groningen ===
On 2 July 2023, Peersman signed a three-year contract with Groningen, who had just been relegated from the Eredivisie. He made his debut for the club on 11 August 2023 in a 4–1 home win over Jong Ajax in the Eerste Divisie. Manager Dick Lukkien started him at left-back, a position he retained for the rest of the season. On 1 November 2023, Peersman scored his first goal for the club, a 71st-minute winner set up by Wouter Prins in a first-round KNVB Cup tie away to Rijnsburgse Boys. A few days later he scored his first league goal, putting Groningen 2–1 ahead in the 69th minute of a 2–2 home draw with FC Dordrecht. Groningen finished the 2023–24 season as Eerste Divisie runners-up and returned to the Eredivisie after a single season away.

In the first half of the 2024–25 season, Peersman partnered Marco Rente at centre-back. In late November he lost his place in the centre to Thijmen Blokzijl and moved back to left-back, where he stayed for the rest of the campaign. In that season his only absence came in February, after he broke a metatarsal in an away match against Heracles Almelo. In the 2025–26 season, his third and last at Groningen, Peersman was again a regular, making 35 competitive starts. He sat out only the home match against PSV, through suspension. On 2 May 2026, he made his 100th competitive appearance for the club in a 3–2 home defeat to Excelsior. Despite being offered a new contract at Groningen, Peersman chose to leave the club at the end of the season.

=== Telstar ===
On 6 July 2026, Peersman signed a two-year contract with Eredivisie club Telstar.

== International career ==
Born in Belgium to a Ghanaian father and a Belgian mother of Flemish descent, Peersman holds both Belgian and Ghanaian nationality and is eligible to represent either country. He made six appearances for the Belgium under-19 team in 2009 and 2010.

== Career statistics ==
As of match played 21 May 2026

Appearances and goals by club, season and competition
Club	Season	League			National cup (Note: Includes Belgian Cup, KNVB Cup, Israel State Cup, Greek Cup)		League cup (Note: Includes Israel Toto Cup)		Europe		Other		Total	
Club	Season	Division	Apps	Goals	Apps	Goals	Apps	Goals	Apps	Goals	Apps	Goals	Apps	Goals
Beveren	2009–10	Belgian First Division B	20	0	2	0	—		—		—		22	0
Royal Antwerp	2010–11	Belgian First Division B	31	0	2	0	—		—		—		33	0
Royal Antwerp	2011–12	Belgian First Division B	13	0	1	0	—		—		—		14	0
Royal Antwerp	Total		44	0	3	0	—		—		—		47	0
Dordrecht	2012–13	Eerste Divisie	20	0	3	0	—		—		2 (Note: Appearances in league play-offs)	0	25	0
Dordrecht	2013–14	Eerste Divisie	35	1	1	0	—		—		4	0	40	1
Dordrecht	2014–15	Eredivisie	26	0	1	0	—		—		—		27	0
Dordrecht	Total		81	1	5	0	—		—		6	0	92	1
Cambuur	2015–16	Eredivisie	32	0	1	0	—		—		—		33	0
Cambuur	2016–17	Eerste Divisie	35	0	5	0	—		—		2	0	42	0
Cambuur	2017–18	Eerste Divisie	15	1	3	1	—		—		—		18	2
Cambuur	Total		82	1	9	1	—		—		2	0	93	2
Hapoel Tel Aviv	2017–18	Liga Leumit	15	0	—		—		—		—		15	0
Hapoel Tel Aviv	2018–19	Israeli Premier League	31	0	2	0	5	1	—		—		38	1
Hapoel Tel Aviv	2019–20	Israeli Premier League	33	1	3	0	4	0	—		—		40	1
Hapoel Tel Aviv	Total		79	1	5	0	9	1	—		—		93	2
PAS Giannina	2020–21	Superleague Greece	30	0	5	0	—		—		—		35	0
PAS Giannina	2021–22	Superleague Greece	26	2	1	0	—		—		—		27	2
PAS Giannina	Total		56	2	6	0	—		—		—		62	2
Aris	2022–23	Superleague Greece	29	0	3	0	—		4 (Note: Appearances in UEFA Conference League)	0	—		36	0
Groningen	2023–24	Eerste Divisie	37	3	4	1	—		—		—		41	4
Groningen	2024–25	Eredivisie	26	0	1	0	—		—		—		27	0
Groningen	2025–26	Eredivisie	33	3	1	0	—		—		1 (Note: Appearances in Eredivisie European play-offs)	0	35	3
Groningen	Total		96	6	6	1	—		—		1	0	103	7
Telstar	2026–27	Eredivisie	0	0	0	0	—		—		—		0	0
Career total			487	11	39	2	9	1	4	0	9	0	548	14

== Honours ==
Individual

- PAS Giannina Player of the Year: 2020–21
