= Fred Grim =

Dutch footballer

Personal information
- Full name: Johann Georg Friedrich Grim
- Date of birth: 17 August 1965 (age 61)
- Place of birth: Noordbeemster, Netherlands
- Height: 1.88 m (6 ft 2 in)
- Position: Goalkeeper

Youth career
- 1972–1980: JOS Watergraafsmeer
- 1980–1986: Ajax

Senior career*
Years	Team	Apps	(Gls)
1986–1987	Ajax	0	(0)
1987	→ Cambuur (loan)	20	(0)
1987–1994	Cambuur	288	(1)
1994–2002	Ajax	101	(0)
Total		409	(1)

Managerial career
- 2002–2004: Ajax (academy)
- 2004–2005: Jong Ajax (assistant)
- 2005–2007: Ajax (goalkeeper coach)
- 2007–2009: Sparta (assistant)
- 2009–2010: Jong Ajax (goalkeeper coach)
- 2010–2012: Ajax (U19 manager)
- 2012–2015: Almere City
- 2015–2016: Netherlands U21
- 2016–2017: Netherlands (assistant)
- 2017: Netherlands (caretaker)
- 2017–2018: Sparta (assistant)
- 2018–2021: RKC
- 2021–2022: Willem II
- 2023–2024: Emmen
- 2025–2026: Ajax (caretaker)
- * Club domestic league appearances and goals

Johann Georg Friedrich "Fred" Grim (born 17 August 1965) is a Dutch football coach and former player who was most recently the caretaker manager of Ajax. A former goalkeeper, Grim represented Ajax and Cambuur during his playing career.

== Playing career ==
Grim began his career in the youth department of JOS from the Watergraafsmeer district of Amsterdam. In 1984, he joined the famed Ajax youth academy and also progressed to the first team, but did however not appear in the Eredivisie, as he was mostly a reserve behind starter Stanley Menzo. During the 1986–87 season, Cambuur head coach Fritz Korbach brought him to the Leeuwarden-based club competing in the second-tier Eerste Divisie, first on a loan deal and since on a permanent contract. Under the German manager, he made his professional debut in December 1986, as regular starter Oscar Zijlstra had sustained a back injury. Grim became the starter and stayed in that position for almost seven years. His highlight during the period was the 1991–92 Eerste Divisie title and subsequent promotion to the Eredivisie under head coach Rob Baan. With relegation in 1994, Grim ended his time at Cambuur after 272 league appearances, and returned to Ajax.

Once back at his former club, he was demoted to being a backup again. From the time of his move in 1994 and to the end of the 1998–99 season, he made only four appearances in the Eredivisie. It was only when starter Edwin van der Sar moved to Juventus that Grim became a regular starter for Ajax at the age of 34. He held this position for three years until he announced his retirement at the end of the 2001–02 season after winning the domestic double; the Eredivisie and the KNVB Cup. 128 games for the Amsterdam team, including 101 in the league, were up for him at this point. "It was difficult to quit after such a high point," he said later, "but that way I was able to pursue my ambitions to become a coach."

== Managerial career ==
After his active playing career, Grim became goalkeeper coach at the Ajax Academy. From the 2004-05 season, Grim functioned as assistant coach for Jong Ajax with John van den Brom as manager. He held this position until March 2005, where he was promoted to Ajax' first team staff as a goalkeeper coach under manager Danny Blind.

In the 2007–08 season, Grim was assistant coach to Gert Aandewiel at Sparta Rotterdam. From the 2009–10 season, Grim began a three-year-period as a goalkeeper coach for Jong Ajax. Later, it turned out that Grim did not finish his period as goalkeeper coach because of the many coaching changes at Ajax. He was appointed head coach of the Ajax U19 in 2010. Grim reached the finals of the NextGen Series in the 2011–12 season with the U19. This was the very first edition of the European tournament for under-19s. In the final, they lost to Inter Milan. Grim won the national title for U19s twice with the Ajax team. He received his highest coaching diploma on 17 February 2010.

On 11 October 2012, it was announced that Grim became head coach of Almere City, who were in last place in the second-tier Eerste Divisie at the time. After the arrival of Grim, results improved. On 30 November 2012, the 2–1 victory over Excelsior set a new club record, as this marked the fifth win in a row for Almere City. On 14 December, Grim received his first personal prize as a trainer: prior to the match against Dordrecht, he was awarded the Bronze Bull by Kenneth Perez, after being voted the best manager of the second period. Two years later, on 12 December 2014, the club won its first period championship in club history, allowing the team to participate in the play-offs for promotion to the Eredivisie. However, these were lost 2–3 on aggregate to De Graafschap.

On 22 June 2015, it was announced that he would leave Almere City for the Netherlands under-21 team. Under his leadership, the Netherlands failed to qualify for the 2017 UEFA European Under-21 Championship. The Netherlands came second in the group behind Slovakia and lost the decisive play-offs to Portugal.

In 2016, Grim became Danny Blind's assistant for the Netherlands. After Blind was fired on 26 March 2017, after losing the World Cup qualifier against Bulgaria 2–0 the day before, Grim was appointed caretaker national coach. On 28 March 2017, the Netherlands lost 1–2 to Italy in a friendly match under his leadership. Under his leadership, the Dutch national team also won a friendly against Morocco 2–1 and a friendly against Ivory Coast 5–0. These matches were played on 31 May and 4 June 2017 respectively. Between September 2017 and November 2017, Grim became assistant coach again under the new national coach Dick Advocaat. The Netherlands national team failed to qualify for the 2018 FIFA World Cup.

At the end of 2017, Grim became Advocaat's assistant coach at Sparta Rotterdam. The goal was for the club to maintain itself in the Eredivisie for that season. At the time, the club was in last place. Direct relegation was avoided at the end of the league, but the club had to go through play-offs for promotion/relegation. In the final of the play-offs, they lost 1–3 on aggregate to Emmen, relegating Sparta to the Eerste Divisie.

On 8 July 2018, it was announced that Grim would become the new head coach of RKC Waalwijk in the Eerste Divisie. He signed for two seasons. In his first season at the club, the promotion play-offs were achieved. By successively beating NEC and Excelsior, the final was reached. The 1st final on 25 May 2019 at home against Go Ahead Eagles was 0–0. On 28 May, RKC Waalwijk won in spectacular fashion against Go Ahead Eagles with a final score of 4–5 and thus forced promotion to the Eredivisie. In the very last seconds of extra time, Stijn Spierings managed to score the 4–4 equalizer; enough to secure the promotion. Mario Bilate even scored the 4–5 from a penalty in the remaining seconds.

On 28 May 2021, Willem II announced that Grim would be the club's new coach. Grim was sacked on 8 March 2022, along with technical director Joris Mathijsen, with Willem sitting just above the relegation zone. Grim was appointed manager of a relegated Emmen side as a replacement of Dick Lukkien in June 2023. On 9 April 2024 FC Emmen announced that Grim was sacked with only 5 games left.

Grim was named assistant to manager John Heitinga at Ajax in October 2025, only to take over Heitinga's tasks as a caretaker after the latter was dismissed on 6 November 2025. Grim was dismissed himself on 8 February 2026. During his time as caretaker manager, Ajax won 9 of their 21 matches, were knocked out of the KNVB Cup quarter-finals with a joint-club record 6–0 to AZ and the UEFA Champions League league phase, and dropped to fifth place in the Eredivisie. After his dismissal, Grim returned as head of coaching in the Ajax Academy.

=== Managerial statistics ===
As of match played 7 March 2026

Team	From	To	Record					
Team	From	To	G	W	D	L	Win %	Ref.
Almere City	11 October 2012	30 June 2015	103	34	19	50	33.01	
Netherlands U-21	1 July 2015	23 September 2016	8	5	1	2	62.50	
Netherlands (Caretaker manager)	28 March 2017	5 June 2017	3	2	0	1	66.67	
RKC Waalwijk	8 July 2018	30 June 2021	109	34	19	56	31.19	
Willem II	1 July 2021	8 March 2022	26	6	4	16	23.08	
Emmen	14 June 2023	9 April 2024	34	13	6	15	38.24	
Ajax (interim)	6 November 2025	8 March 2026	21	9	6	6	42.86	
Total			304	103	55	146	33.88	—

== Honours ==
=== Player ===
Cambuur

- Eerste Divisie: 1991–92

Ajax

- Eredivisie: 1994–95, 1995–96, 1997–98, 2001–02
- KNVB Cup: 1997–98, 1998–99, 2001–02
- Johan Cruijff Shield: 1995, 2002
- UEFA Champions League: 1994–95
- UEFA Super Cup: 1995
- Intercontinental Cup: 1995

=== Manager ===
Ajax U19

- U19 Eredivisie: 2010–11, 2011–12

RKC Waalwijk

- Eerste Divisie play-offs: 2019

Individual

- Eredivisie Manager of the Month: December 2025
