= 2025–26 Eredivisie =

70th season of the Eredivisie

Eredivisie
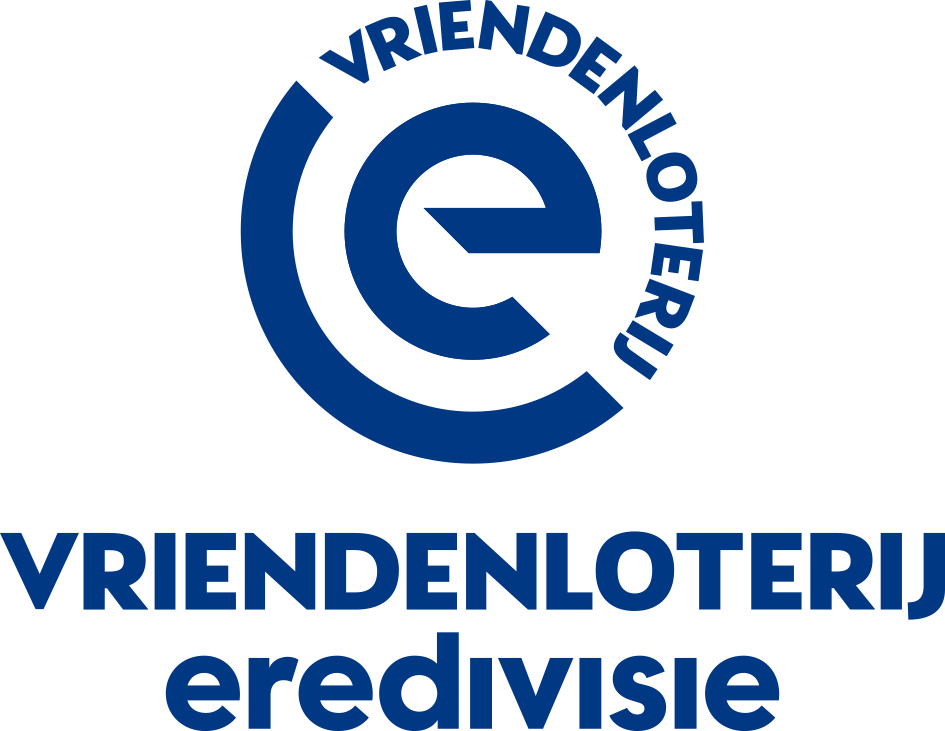
- Season: 2025–26
- Dates: 8 August 2025 – 17 May 2026
- Champions: PSV Eindhoven (27th title)
- Relegated: Volendam; NAC Breda; Heracles Almelo
- Champions League: PSV Eindhoven; Feyenoord; NEC
- Europa League: AZ (as cup winners); Twente
- Conference League: Ajax
- Matches: 306
- Goals: 972 (3.18 per match)
- Top goalscorer: Ayase Ueda (25 goals)
- Biggest home win: Heracles Almelo 8–2 PEC Zwolle (2 November 2025); Go Ahead Eagles 6–0 NAC Breda (15 March 2026)
- Biggest away win: Heracles Almelo 0–7 Feyenoord (19 October 2025)
- Highest scoring: Heracles Almelo 8–2 PEC Zwolle (2 November 2025)
- Longest winning run: 13 matches PSV Eindhoven
- Longest unbeaten run: 18 matches PSV Eindhoven
- Longest winless run: 13 matches Heracles Almelo
- Longest losing run: 6 matches Groningen; Heracles Almelo

The 2025–26 Eredivisie, also known as VriendenLoterij Eredivisie for sponsorship reasons, was the 70th season of Eredivisie, the premier football competition in the Netherlands. The league games were held between 8 August 2025 and 17 May 2026. Two-time defending champions PSV Eindhoven clinched their 27th title on 5 April 2026 after Feyenoord's 0–0 draw with Volendam.

On 15 March, NAC Breda submitted an appeal against their 6–0 loss because Go Ahead Eagles had included Dean James, who had forfeited his Dutch nationality after obtaining Indonesian citizenship in order to play World Cup qualifiers. This rendered him ineligible to take part in the match. The Royal Dutch Football Association (KNVB) refused to order a replay of the match but confirmed that James was technically ineligible due to issues with his passport. However, the club and the player were not aware at the time that changing his nationality would lead to legal consequences. The association warned that ruling in favour of Breda could open more than 130 matches to legal scrutiny. On 4 May, the Utrecht Court supported the KNVB's decision.

== Teams ==
=== Team changes ===
▲ from 2024–25 Eerste Divisie	▼ to 2025–26 Eerste Divisie
Volendam (promoted after a single season absence); Excelsior (promoted after a single season absence); Telstar (promoted after a 47-year absence)	Willem II (relegated after a single season in top flight); Almere City (relegated after two seasons in top flight); RKC Waalwijk (relegated after six seasons in top flight)

Locations of the 2025–26 Eredivisie teams
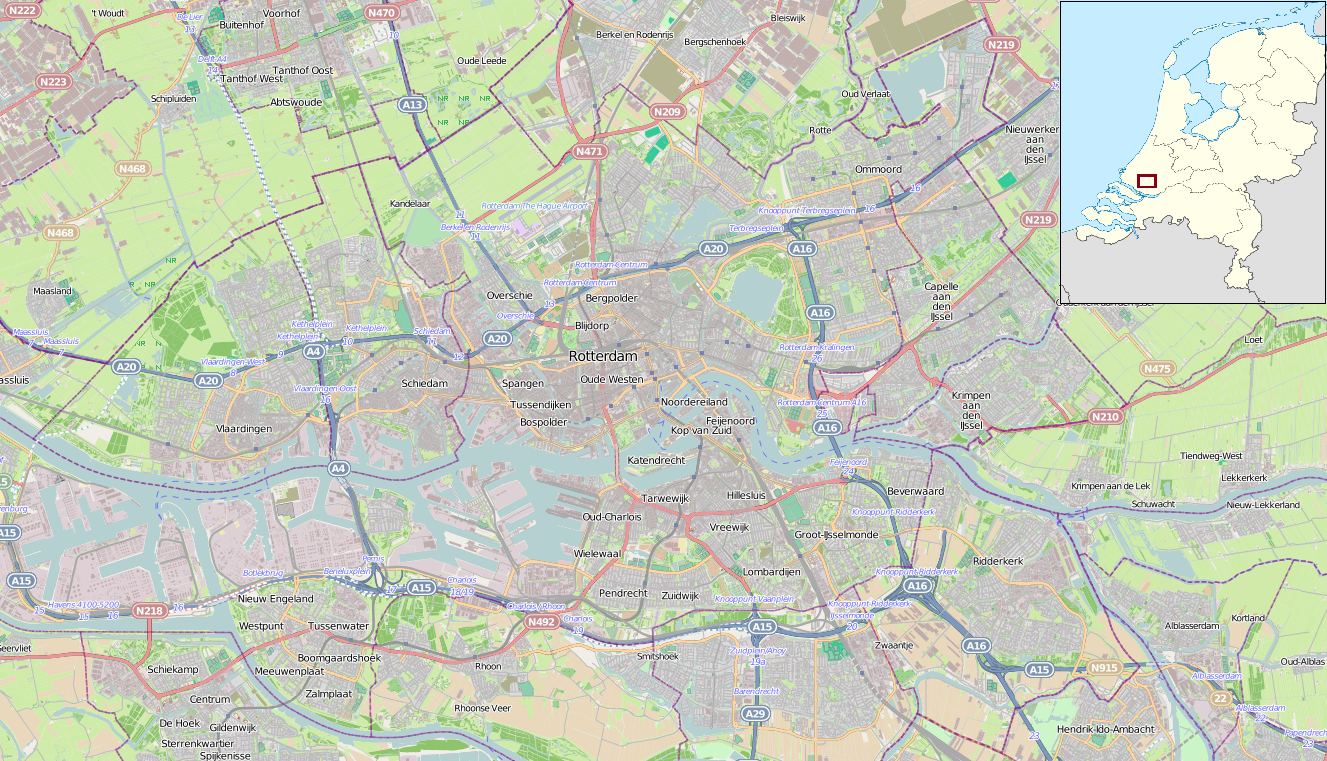
Rotterdam Eredivisie football clubs

=== Stadiums and locations ===
Club	Location	Venue	Capacity	2024–25 position
Ajax	Amsterdam	Johan Cruyff Arena	55,865	2nd
AZ	Alkmaar	AFAS Stadion	19,478	5th
Excelsior	Rotterdam	Van Donge & De Roo Stadion	4,500	1D, 2nd
Feyenoord	Rotterdam	De Kuip	47,500	3rd
Fortuna Sittard	Sittard	Fortuna Sittard Stadion	10,300	11th
Go Ahead Eagles	Deventer	De Adelaarshorst	10,000	7th
Groningen	Groningen	Euroborg	22,550	13th
Heerenveen	Heerenveen	Abe Lenstra Stadion	27,224	9th
Heracles Almelo	Almelo	Asito Stadion	12,080	14th
NAC Breda	Breda	Rat Verlegh Stadion	19,000	15th
NEC	Nijmegen	Goffertstadion	12,500	8th
PEC Zwolle	Zwolle	MAC³PARK Stadion	13,250	10th
PSV Eindhoven	Eindhoven	Philips Stadion	36,500	1st
Sparta Rotterdam	Rotterdam	Spartastadion Het Kasteel	11,000	12th
Telstar	Velsen	BUKO Stadion	5,338	1D, 7th
Twente	Enschede	De Grolsch Veste	30,205	6th
Utrecht	Utrecht	Stadion Galgenwaard	23,750	4th
Volendam	Volendam	Kras Stadion	7,384	1D, 1st

=== Number of teams by province ===
Number of teams	Province	Team(s)
4	Overijssel	Go Ahead Eagles, Heracles Almelo, PEC Zwolle, Twente
4	North Holland	Ajax, AZ, Telstar, Volendam
3	South Holland	Excelsior, Feyenoord, Sparta Rotterdam
2	North Brabant	NAC Breda, PSV Eindhoven
1	Friesland	Heerenveen
1	Gelderland	NEC
1	Groningen	Groningen
1	Limburg	Fortuna Sittard
1	Utrecht	Utrecht

=== Personnel and kits ===
Note: Flags indicate national team as has been defined under FIFA eligibility rules. Players and managers may hold more than one non-FIFA nationality.

Team	President	Manager	Captain	Kit manufacturer	Shirt sponsors (front)	Shirt sponsors (back)	Shirt sponsors (sleeves)	Shorts sponsors
Ajax	(Netherlands) Menno Geelen	(Spain) Óscar García	(Netherlands) Davy Klaassen	Adidas	Ziggo	Olympia	Team Rockstars IT	None
AZ	(Netherlands) Merijn Zeeman	(Netherlands) Lee-Roy Echteld (interim)	(Netherlands) Jordy Clasie	Nike	AFAS Software	Elfi Vastgoed	Cavallaro Napoli	None
Excelsior	(Netherlands) Bob de Lange	(Netherlands) Ruben den Uil	(Sweden) Casper Widell	Robey	DSW		Caru Containers	None
Feyenoord	(Netherlands) Dennis te Kloese	(Netherlands) Robin van Persie	(Germany) Timon Wellenreuther	Castore	Mediamarkt	Prijsvrij	TOTO Nederlandse Loterij	None
Fortuna Sittard	(Netherlands) Martijn Merks	(Netherlands) Danny Buijs	(Portugal) Ivo Pinto	Robey	Fortuna Verbindt	Winkelhart sittard	None	None
Go Ahead Eagles	(Netherlands) Jan Willem van Dop	(Netherlands) Melvin Boel	(Netherlands) Joris Kramer	Stanno	Retro Bridge, One Click Steel	Validsign, Salland Zorgverzekeringen	LoooX, Matrix Fitness	MaxiZoo
Groningen	(Netherlands) Frank van Mosselveld	(Netherlands) Dick Lukkien	(Netherlands) Stije Resink	Robey	OG Clean Fuels	U-Sport	TOTO Nederlandse Loterij	None
Heerenveen	(Netherlands) Ferry de Haan	(Netherlands) Robin Veldman	(Netherlands) Luuk Brouwers	Macron	Wolkom onbegrensd Fryslân	MASCOT Workwear, Effektief	TOTO Nederlandse Loterij	Veolia
Heracles Almelo	(Netherlands) Bart Haverland	(Netherlands) Ernest Faber	(Netherlands) Damon Mirani	Acerbis	Asito	Asito	Kans voor een Kind	Asito
NAC Breda	(Netherlands) Remco Oversier	(Belgium) Carl Hoefkens	(Netherlands) Boy Kemper	Nike	OK Brandstoffen en Smeermiddelen	Vrolijk, MHC Mobility	vdBuijs Installaties, Jacobs Elektro Groep	Xior Student Housing
NEC	(Netherlands) Wilco van Schaik	(Netherlands) Dick Schreuder	(Suriname) Tjaronn Chery	Robey	Nexperia	KlokGroep	NasWerkt	GX Software
PEC Zwolle	(Netherlands) Xander Czaikowski	(Netherlands) Henry van der Vegt	(New Zealand) Ryan Thomas	Adidas	Zonneplan	Molecaten	VDK Groep	Quades
PSV Eindhoven	(Netherlands) Marcel Brands	(Netherlands) Peter Bosz	(Netherlands) Jerdy Schouten	Puma	Metropoolregio Brainport Eindhoven	GoodHabitz	TOTO Nederlandse Loterij	None
Sparta Rotterdam	(Netherlands) Leo Ruijs	(Netherlands) Maurice Steijn	(Netherlands) Bruno Martins Indi	Robey	De Goudse Verzekeringen, D&S Group	Blue10, VNOM	TOTO Nederlandse Loterij, BICT Groep	Toll Global Forwarding, Trofi Pack
Telstar	(Netherlands) Leon Annokkée	(Netherlands) Anthony Correia	(Netherlands) Jeff Hardeveld	Robey	BUKO	Nederlof Fish	Nederlof Fish	None
Twente	(Netherlands) Paul van der Kraan	(Netherlands) John van den Brom	(Netherlands) Robin Pröpper	Castore	Elektramat	ThermoSolutions BV	TOTO Nederlandse Loterij, Taurus Corporate Finance	Elektramat
Utrecht	(Netherlands) Thijs van Es	(Netherlands) Ron Jans	(Netherlands) Nick Viergever	Castore	Conclusion	Dubai-Property.nl	Indeed	Dassy
Volendam	(Netherlands) Cees Driebergen	(Netherlands) Rick Kruys	(Netherlands) Henk Veerman	Robey	HSB	Mascot Workwear / Timbo	podobrace.nl	None

=== Managerial changes ===
Team	Outgoing manager	Manner of departure	Date of vacancy	Position in table	Replaced by	Date of appointment
Ajax	(Italy) Francesco Farioli	Resigned	19 May 2025	Pre-season	(Netherlands) John Heitinga	31 May 2025
Go Ahead Eagles	(Netherlands) Paul Simonis	Signed by VfL Wolfsburg	12 June 2025	Pre-season	(Netherlands) Melvin Boel	12 June 2025
PEC Zwolle	(Netherlands) Johnny Jansen	End of contract	30 June 2025	Pre-season	(Netherlands) Henry van der Vegt	1 July 2025
NEC	(Netherlands) Rogier Meijer	End of contract	30 June 2025	Pre-season	(Netherlands) Dick Schreuder	1 July 2025
Twente	(Netherlands) Joseph Oosting	Sacked	4 September 2025	14th	(Netherlands) John van den Brom	15 September 2025
Heracles	(Netherlands) Bas Sibum	Sacked	26 October 2025	18th	(Netherlands) Ernest Faber	1 December 2025
Ajax	(Netherlands) John Heitinga	Sacked	6 November 2025	4th	(Netherlands) Fred Grim	21 November 2025
AZ	(Belgium) Maarten Martens	Sacked	18 January 2026	8th	(Netherlands) Lee-Roy Echteld (Note: Echteld was initially named interim manager before being appointed manager on a permanent basis on 8 May 2026.)	18 January 2026
Ajax	(Netherlands) Fred Grim	Returned to Ajax Academy	8 March 2026	4th	(Spain) Óscar García	8 March 2026

== League table ==
Pos	Team	Pld	W	D	L	GF	GA	GD	Pts	Qualification or relegation
1	PSV Eindhoven (C)	34	27	3	4	101	45	+56	84	Qualification for the Champions League league phase
2	Feyenoord	34	19	8	7	70	44	+26	65	Qualification for the Champions League league phase
3	NEC	34	16	11	7	77	53	+24	59	Qualification for the Champions League third qualifying round
4	Twente	34	15	13	6	59	40	+19	58	Qualification for the Europa League second qualifying round
5	Ajax (O)	34	14	14	6	62	41	+21	56	Qualification for the European competition play-offs
6	Utrecht	34	15	8	11	55	42	+13	53	Qualification for the European competition play-offs
7	AZ	34	14	10	10	58	51	+7	52	Qualification for the Europa League league phase (Note: Qualified for the Europa League league phase as the 2025–26 KNVB Cup winners.)
8	Heerenveen	34	14	9	11	57	53	+4	51	Qualification for the European competition play-offs
9	Groningen	34	14	6	14	49	45	+4	48	Qualification for the European competition play-offs
10	Sparta Rotterdam	34	12	7	15	40	62	−22	43	
11	Fortuna Sittard	34	11	6	17	49	63	−14	39	
12	Go Ahead Eagles	34	8	14	12	54	53	+1	38	
13	Excelsior	34	10	8	16	43	56	−13	38	
14	Telstar	34	9	10	15	49	55	−6	37	
15	PEC Zwolle	34	9	10	15	44	71	−27	37	
16	Volendam (R)	34	8	8	18	35	55	−20	32	Qualification for the Relegation play-off
17	NAC Breda (R)	34	6	11	17	35	58	−23	29	Relegation to Eerste Divisie
18	Heracles Almelo (R)	34	5	4	25	35	85	−50	19	Relegation to Eerste Divisie

Source: Eredivisie
Rules for classification: At end of season: 1) Points; 2) Goal difference; 3) Goals scored; 4) Head-to-head points; 5) Head-to-head goal difference; 6) Head-to-head goals scored; 7) Head-to-head away goals scored; 8) Play-off match or matches; 9) Penalty shoot-out (if the play-off match or matches end in a draw)
(C) Champions; (O) Play-off winners; (R) Relegated

== Results ==
Home \ Away	AJA	AZ	EXC	FEY	FOR	GAE	GRO	HEE	HER	NAC	NEC	PEC	PSV	SPA	TEL	TWE	UTR	VOL
Ajax		0–2	1–2	2–0	4–1	2–2	2–0	1–1	2–0	2–1	1–1	3–1	2–2	4–0	2–0	1–2	1–2	2–0
AZ	1–1		1–1	3–3	2–0	2–2	4–1	3–0	4–0	3–3	1–3	2–2	1–5	3–1	2–1	2–2	4–1	1–0
Excelsior	2–2	1–2		1–2	1–0	0–1	0–2	1–2	1–2	1–0	0–2	2–1	1–2	0–1	2–2	1–0	5–0	1–1
Feyenoord	1–1	1–1	2–1		2–0	1–0	3–1	1–0	4–2	2–0	2–4	6–1	2–3	3–4	2–1	1–1	3–2	3–1
Fortuna Sittard	1–3	4–3	2–1	1–2		2–2	1–2	2–0	1–1	1–1	3–2	3–2	1–2	2–2	1–4	1–2	1–0	1–0
Go Ahead Eagles	2–2	0–0	2–0	2–1	2–2		1–1	1–3	4–0	6–0	1–1	5–0	1–4	0–3	1–1	1–4	2–2	3–0
Groningen	3–1	3–0	2–3	0–1	1–2	0–0		2–1	4–0	0–0	2–1	2–2	1–2	0–2	2–0	1–1	1–2	3–0
Heerenveen	0–0	3–1	2–1	2–2	2–1	2–2	0–2		4–1	3–3	3–2	4–2	0–2	2–1	3–0	1–2	1–1	1–1
Heracles Almelo	0–3	1–2	1–1	0–7	2–1	4–2	1–2	0–3		0–1	1–4	8–2	1–3	3–0	1–1	0–2	0–0	0–2
NAC Breda	0–2	0–1	0–2	3–3	2–1	1–0	1–2	2–0	2–1		3–4	2–2	0–1	0–0	0–1	2–2	1–1	1–0
NEC	2–2	2–1	5–0	1–1	2–3	2–1	2–0	2–2	4–1	3–0		2–1	3–5	3–1	1–1	3–3	1–3	3–0
PEC Zwolle	0–0	3–1	2–2	0–2	1–0	0–2	1–1	2–1	1–0	2–1	2–2		0–4	1–0	4–1	1–0	0–2	1–2
PSV Eindhoven	2–2	2–1	5–1	3–0	5–2	2–1	4–2	3–1	4–3	2–2	2–3	6–1		6–1	0–2	5–1	4–3	3–0
Sparta Rotterdam	3–3	0–1	2–3	0–4	1–1	2–2	2–0	0–3	2–0	1–0	1–1	1–1	0–2		1–0	1–5	2–1	2–0
Telstar	2–3	0–1	2–2	1–2	1–3	4–2	0–2	2–3	3–0	3–0	2–2	0–2	3–1	4–1		1–1	1–1	2–2
Twente	2–3	1–0	0–0	2–0	3–2	2–0	2–1	5–0	2–1	2–2	1–1	1–1	0–2	4–0	0–0		0–2	2–1
Utrecht	2–1	2–0	4–1	0–1	2–0	2–0	0–1	2–2	4–0	2–0	1–0	1–1	1–2	0–1	4–1	1–1		3–1
Volendam	1–1	2–2	1–2	0–0	1–2	1–1	3–2	0–2	3–0	2–1	2–3	2–1	2–1	0–1	1–2	1–1	2–1	

Source: Flashscore
Legend: Blue = home team win; Yellow = draw; Red = away team win.

== Play-offs ==
All times Central European Summer Time (UTC+2)

=== European competition play-offs ===
==== Bracket ====
Semi-finals
5	Ajax	2
9	Groningen	0
6	Utrecht	3
8	Heerenveen	2

Final
5	Ajax (p)	1 (4)
6	Utrecht	1 (3)

==== Semi-finals ====
21 May 2026
18:45

Ajax	2–0	Groningen
Klaassen 24'; Mokio 57'	Report

Kras Stadion (Note: Ajax played their play-off matches at the Kras Stadion in Volendam, instead of their regular stadium, the Johan Cruyff Arena, in Amsterdam, due to Harry Styles' Together, Together tour taking place at the stadium.), Volendam
Attendance: 6,776
Referee: Marc Nagtegaal
21 May 2026
21:00

Utrecht	3–2	Heerenveen
Stepanov 46'; Van der Hoorn 56'; El Karouani 58'	Report	Vente 54'; Trenskow 77'

Stadion Galgenwaard, Utrecht
Attendance: 19,334
Referee: Jannick van der Laan

==== Final ====
24 May 2026
12:15

Ajax	1–1 (a.e.t.)	Utrecht
Klaassen 96'	Report	Zechiël 106'
Penalties
Klaassen (penalty scored); Weghorst (penalty scored); Godts (penalty scored); Gaaei (penalty scored)	4–3	(penalty missed) Haller; (penalty scored) El Arguioui; (penalty scored) Zechiël; (penalty scored) Blake; (penalty missed) El Karouani

Kras Stadion, Volendam
Attendance: 5,200
Referee: Allard Lindhoudt

=== Promotion/relegation play-offs ===
==== Bracket ====
First round
6	RKC Waalwijk (p)	1	1	2 (3)
8	Roda JC Kerkrade	1	1	2 (1)
5	Almere City	3	3	6
9	Den Bosch	2	0	2

Quarterfinals
3	Willem II	1	1	2
6	RKC Waalwijk	0	1	1
4	De Graafschap	1	2	3
5	Almere City	3	2	5

Semifinal
3	Willem II	1	2	3
5	Almere City	0	0	0

Final
16	Volendam	2	1	3 (4)
3	Willem II (p)	1	2	3 (5)

==== First round ====
28 April 2026
18:45

Roda JC Kerkrade	1–1	RKC Waalwijk
Kalinauskas 90+5'		Cleonise 51'

Parkstad Limburg Stadion, Kerkrade
1 May 2026
20:00

RKC Waalwijk	1–1 (a.e.t.)	Roda JC Kerkrade
Uneken 90+7'		Van den Hurk 52'
Penalties
Van Kaam (penalty scored); Van Eijma (penalty scored); Van Gelderen (penalty scored)	3–1	(penalty missed) Paulissen; (penalty scored) Déom; (penalty missed) Kalinauskas; (penalty missed) Beerten

Mandemakers Stadion, Waalwijk

2–2 on aggregate. RKC Waalwijk won 3–1 on penalties.

29 April 2026
18:45

Den Bosch	2–3	Almere City
Grach 16'; Monzialo 44'		Jacobs 57'; Druijf 65'; Dors 88'

De Vliert, 's-Hertogenbosch
2 May 2026
14:00

Almere City	3–0	Den Bosch
Dors 41'; Druijf 82'; Rijkhoff 89'

Yanmar Stadion, Almere

Almere City won 6–2 on aggregate.

==== Quarterfinals ====
5 May 2026
18:45

RKC Waalwijk	0–1	Willem II
		Roemeratoe 63' (o.g.)

Mandemakers Stadion, Waalwijk
9 May 2026
16:30

Willem II	1–1	RKC Waalwijk
El Allouchi 46'		Boëtius 59'

Koning Willem II Stadion, Tilburg

Willem II won 2−1 on aggregate.

6 May 2026
18:45

Almere City	3–1	De Graafschap
Poku 32', 77'; Dors 58'		De Jong 45+2'

Yanmar Stadion, Almere
9 May 2026
20:00

De Graafschap	2–2	Almere City
Besselink 48'; Kwint 90'		Druijf 36'; De Haan 62'

De Vijverberg, Doetinchem

Almere City won 5−3 on aggregate.

==== Semifinal ====
13 May 2026
20:00

Almere City	0–1	Willem II
		Bamba 32'

Yanmar Stadion, Almere
16 May 2026
20:00

Willem II	2–0	Almere City
Van Aalst 60'; Et Taibi 85'

Koning Willem II Stadion, Tilburg

Willem II won 3−0 on aggregate.

==== Final ====
20 May 2026
18:45

Willem II	1−2	Volendam
Doodeman 54'		Ould-Chikh 13'; Veerman 18'

Koning Willem II Stadion, Tilburg
Referee: Jeroen Manschot
23 May 2026
16:30

Volendam	1−2 (a.e.t.)	Willem II
Leliendal 40'		Baartmans 8'; Stam 17'
Penalties
Mühren (penalty scored); Bukala (penalty missed); Pauwels (penalty scored); Kuwas (penalty scored); Leliendal (penalty scored)	4−5	(penalty scored) Haen; (penalty scored) Hoogma; (penalty scored) Doodeman; (penalty scored) Culum; (penalty scored) Didillon-Hödl

Kras Stadion, Volendam

3−3 on aggregate. Willem II won 5–4 on penalties.

== Season statistics ==
=== Top scorers ===
Rank	Player	Club	Goals
1	(Japan) Ayase Ueda	Feyenoord	25
2	(Belgium) Mika Godts	Ajax	17
3	(Republic of Ireland) Troy Parrott	AZ	16
3	(United States) Ricardo Pepi	PSV Eindhoven	16
5	(Morocco) Ismael Saibari	PSV Eindhoven	15
6	(Netherlands) Guus Til	PSV Eindhoven	14
7	(Norway) Tobias Lauritsen	Sparta Rotterdam	12
7	(Netherlands) Kaj Sierhuis	Fortuna Sittard	12
7	(Belgium) Mathis Suray	Go Ahead Eagles	12
7	(Denmark) Jacob Trenskow	Heerenveen	12

=== Hat-tricks ===
Rnd	Player	Club	Goals	Date	Home	Score	Away
9	(Japan) Ayase Ueda	Feyenoord	7', 33', 38'	19 October 2025	Heracles Almelo	0–7	Feyenoord
10	(Morocco) Ismael Saibari	PSV Eindhoven	30', 51', 60'	26 October 2025	Feyenoord	2–3	PSV Eindhoven
11	(Netherlands) Jizz Hornkamp	Heracles Almelo	18', 29', 32'	2 November 2025	Heracles Almelo	8–2	PEC Zwolle
12	(Netherlands) Guus Til	PSV Eindhoven	11', 28', 89'	9 November 2025	AZ	1–5	PSV Eindhoven
15	(Japan) Ayase Ueda^{4}	Feyenoord	11', 20', 42', 55'	6 December 2025	Feyenoord	6–1	PEC Zwolle
27	(Denmark) Jakob Breum	Go Ahead Eagles	45', 73', 76'	15 March 2026	Go Ahead Eagles	6–0	NAC Breda

Notes

^{4} Player scored 4 goals

=== Discipline ===
- Most yellow cards: 10
  - (Netherlands) Philip Brittijn (Fortuna Sittard)
  - (Turkey) Ahmetcan Kaplan (NEC)
- Most red cards: 1
  - 53 players

== Awards ==
=== Monthly awards ===
Month	Player of the Month		Talent of the Month		Manager of the Month		Ref.
Month	Player	Club	Player	Club	Manager	Club	Ref.
August	(Iceland) Brynjólfur Willumsson	Groningen	(Netherlands) Ruben van Bommel	PSV Eindhoven	(Netherlands) Robin van Persie	Feyenoord	
September	(Australia) Jordan Bos	Feyenoord	(Netherlands) Robin van Cruijsen	Volendam	(Netherlands) Dick Lukkien	Groningen	
October	(Japan) Ayase Ueda	Feyenoord	(Netherlands) Gjivai Zechiël	Utrecht	(Belgium) Maarten Martens	AZ	
November	(Netherlands) Guus Til	PSV Eindhoven	(Belgium) Mika Godts	Ajax	(Netherlands) Hendrie Krüzen	Heracles Almelo	
December	(Netherlands) Joey Veerman	PSV Eindhoven	(Netherlands) Mats Rots	Twente	(Netherlands) Fred Grim	Ajax	
January	(Netherlands) Joey Veerman	PSV Eindhoven	(England) Shola Shoretire	PEC Zwolle	(Netherlands) Maurice Steijn	Sparta Rotterdam	
February	(Romania) Dennis Man	PSV Eindhoven	(Belgium) Mika Godts	Ajax	(Netherlands) John van den Brom	Twente	
March	(Denmark) Jakob Breum	Go Ahead Eagles	(Netherlands) Bernt Klaverboer	Heerenveen	(Netherlands) Dick Lukkien	Groningen	
April	(Netherlands) Kayne van Oevelen	Volendam	(Belgium) Mika Godts	Ajax	(Netherlands) Peter Bosz	PSV Eindhoven	
May	(Algeria) Anis Hadj Moussa	Feyenoord	(Netherlands) Gjivai Zechiël	Utrecht	(Netherlands) Ron Jans	Utrecht	

=== Annual awards ===
Award	Player	Club	Ref.
Player of the Season	(Morocco) Ismael Saibari	PSV Eindhoven	
Talent of the Season	(Belgium) Mika Godts	Ajax	
Goal of the Season	(Netherlands) Gyan de Regt	Excelsior	

Team of the Season
Goalkeeper	(Netherlands) Ronald Koeman Jr. (Telstar)			
Defenders	(Netherlands) Bart van Rooij (FC Twente)	(Netherlands) Jerdy Schouten (PSV)	(Japan) Tsuyoshi Watanabe (Feyenoord)	(Brazil) Mauro Júnior (PSV)
Midfielders	(Netherlands) Joey Veerman (PSV)	(Japan) Kodai Sano (NEC Nijmegen)	(Morocco) Ismael Saibari (PSV)	(Croatia) Darko Nejašmić (NEC Nijmegen)
Forwards	(Japan) Ayase Ueda (Feyenoord)		(Belgium) Mika Godts (Ajax)	

== Attendances ==
Eredivisie clubs listed by average home league attendance:

Pos	Club	Average attendance
1	Ajax	50,382
2	Feyenoord	47,500
3	PSV	34,441
4	FC Twente	29,453
5	sc Heerenveen	23,249
6	FC Utrecht	22,701
7	FC Groningen	22,306
8	NAC Breda	20,067
9	AZ	18,374
10	PEC Zwolle	13,882
11	NEC	12,625
12	Heracles Almelo	11,802
13	Fortuna Sittard	10,767
14	Sparta Rotterdam	9,968
15	Go Ahead Eagles	9,543
16	FC Volendam	6,799
17	Telstar	5,232
18	Excelsior	4,433
