= David van der Werff =

Dutch footballer (born 2004)

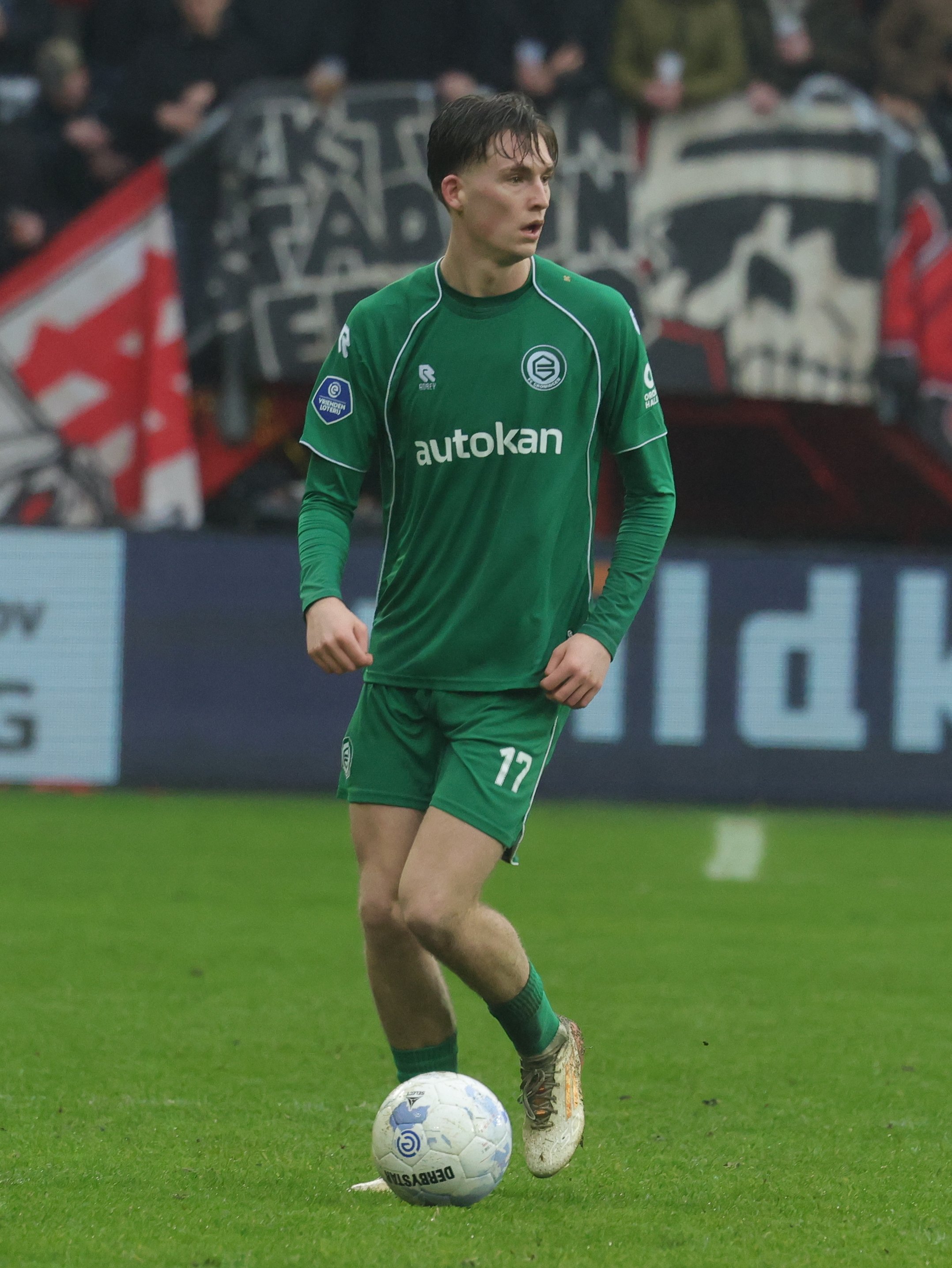

Personal information
- Full name: David van der Werff
- Date of birth: 31 August 2004 (age 22)
- Place of birth: Eelde-Paterswolde, Netherlands
- Height: 1.80 m (5 ft 11 in)
- Position: Attacking midfielder

Team information
- Current team: FC Groningen
- Number: 17

Youth career
- VV Actief
- 2015–2024: FC Groningen

Senior career*
Years	Team	Apps	(Gls)
2024–	FC Groningen	12	(2)
- * Club domestic league appearances and goals as of 25 October 2025

David van der Werff (born 31 August 2004) is a Dutch professional footballer who plays as an attacking midfielder for FC Groningen.

== Club career ==
Van der Werff was scouted by FC Groningen while playing for local side VV Actief in Eelde. He progressed through the club's youth academy before signing his first professional contract on 7 June 2024.

He made his first-team debut on 15 December 2024 in an Eredivisie match against FC Twente, coming on in the 77th minute for Romano Postema in a 2–0 defeat. Three days later, he made his KNVB Cup debut against AZ, replacing Jorg Schreuders in the second half.

== Career statistics ==
Appearances and goals by club, season and competition
Club	Season	League			KNVB Beker		Other		Total	
Club	Season	Division	Apps	Goals	Apps	Goals	Apps	Goals	Apps	Goals
FC Groningen	2024–25	Eredivisie	2	0	1	0	0	0	3	0
FC Groningen	2025–26	Eredivisie	10	2	0	0	0	0	10	2
Career total			12	2	1	0	0	0	13	2
