= Scott Calderwood =

English footballer (born 1978)

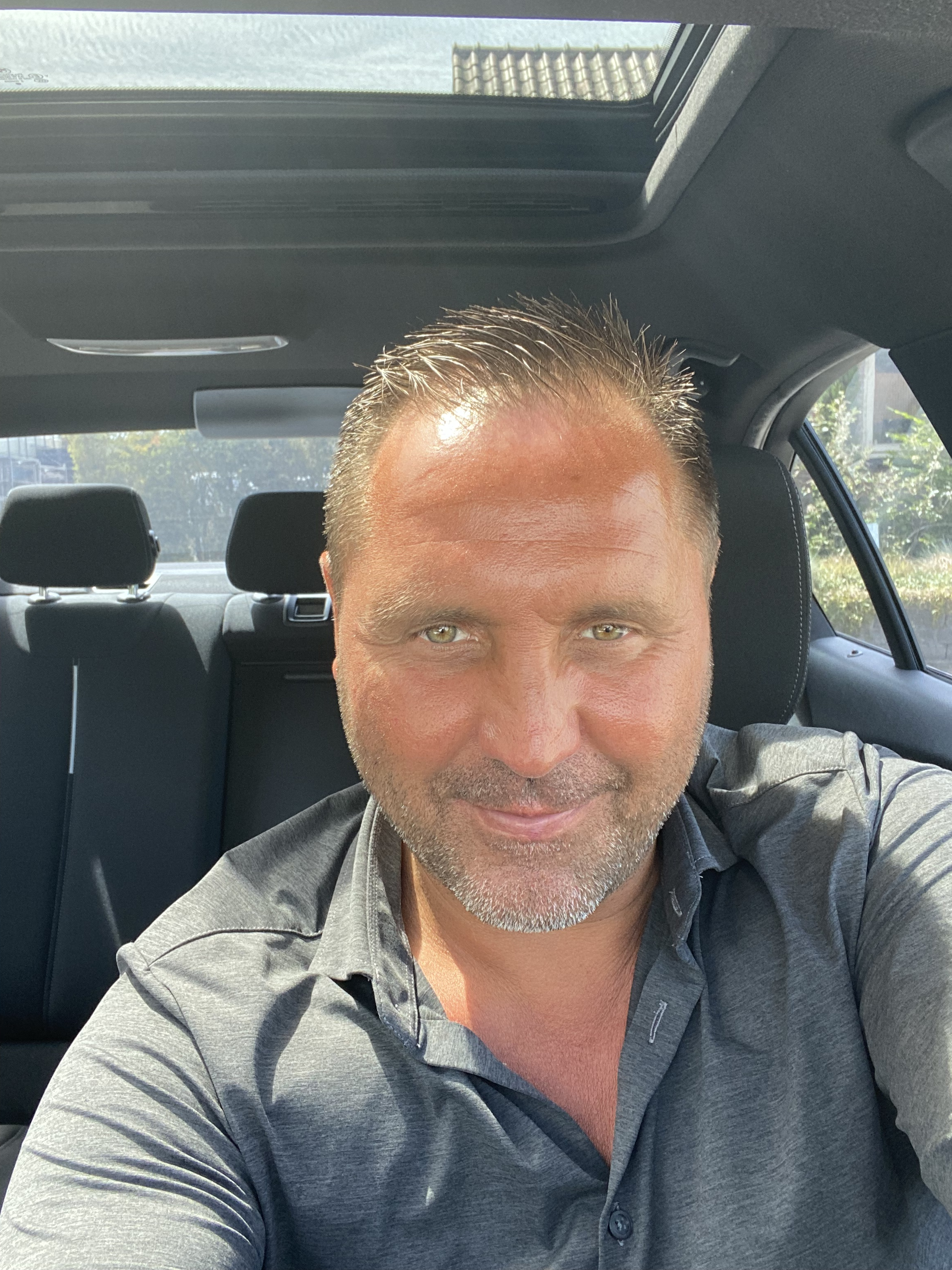

Personal information
- Date of birth: 11 March 1978 (age 48)
- Place of birth: Birmingham, England
- Position: Midfielder

Team information
- Current team: PEC Zwolle (assistant coach)

Senior career*
Years	Team	Apps	(Gls)
1996–1999	Willem II	5	(0)
1999–2001	Heracles Almelo	21	(2)
2001–2004	SV Babberich		
2004–2005	DVS '33		
2005–2006	SV Babberich		
2006–2007	HSC '21		
2009–2010	TSV LONGA		

Managerial career
- 2008–2011: DZC '68
- 2011: Ross County (assistant)
- 2011–2012: SP Silvolde
- 2012: AVW '66
- 2012: Hatta Club
- 2013–2016: SP Silvolde
- 2015–2016: Go Ahead Eagles (assistant)
- 2016–2019: SV DFS
- 2018–2019: FC Dordrecht U-21
- 2018–2019: FC Dordrecht (assistant)
- 2018: FC Dordrecht (caretaker)
- 2019–2021: DOVO
- 2021–2022: FC Den Bosch (assistant)
- 2022–2023: Kozakken Boys
- * Club domestic league appearances and goals

Scott Calderwood (born 11 March 1978) is an English football coach and former player who is an assistant coach at PEC Zwolle.

Calderwood is the son of Jimmy Calderwood and has played for a number of Dutch clubs, including Willem II, Heracles Almelo and SV Babberich.

== Personal life ==
Scott lives in Doetinchem and is owner of a fitnessclub.

== Coaching career ==
Calderwood started his manager career at DZC '68 in 2008. He then became the assistant manager for Ross County on 21 February 2011 under his father Jimmy Calderwood. He left the position three months later, and moved to Dubai for four months where he worked four months, before returning in the summer 2011, and then he became the manager of AVW '66 which he was until August 2012. He was also account manager at Heracles Almelo from March 2012. But in October 2012 he left the clubs for an adventure in Dubai at Hatta Club. Six games later, he was fired in December 2012. He then returned to his job as an account manager at Heracles Almelo.

In the summer 2013, he became the manager of SP Silvolde once again which he was until June 2016. However, he was also appointed as assistant manager for Go Ahead Eagles in June 2015 until June 2016, alongside his manager job at SP Silvolde.

In the summer 2016, Calderwood then became the manager of SV DFS. In January 2019 it was announced, that Calderwood would take a break after the season, but however, he decided to step back already in April 2019. During his time at SV DFS, Calderwood also had several positions at FC Dordrecht. From the summer 2018 until January 2019, he was also the manager of the clubs U-21 team, the assistant coach of the first team and the caretaker manager from mid November until the end of 2018.

On 29 November 2019, he was appointed manager of DOVO.

In June 2025, he became an assistant coach at PEC Zwolle to Henry van der Vegt, alongside Tim Bakens.

=== Agency & Fitness ===
In 2011, Calderwood also founded Soccerfitness by Scott Calderwood.
