= Tim Bakens =

Dutch footballer (born 1982)

Personal information
- Date of birth: 2 November 1982 (age 44)
- Place of birth: Groesbeek, Netherlands
- Height: 2.04 m (6 ft 8 in)
- Position: Centre back

Team information
- Current team: Beveren (manager)

Youth career
- De Treffers
- VV Doetinchem
- VIOD
- De Graafschap

Senior career*
| Years | Team | Apps | (Gls) |
| 2001–2005 | De Graafschap | 76 | (10) |
| 2005–2008 | RKC | 65 | (2) |
| 2008–2009 | Volendam | 29 | (0) |
| 2009 | Sparta | 10 | (0) |
| 2010 | Volendam | 16 | (1) |
| 2010–2012 | St. Gallen | 17 | (1) |
| 2012–2013 | Cambuur | 26 | (0) |
| 2013–2014 | De Graafschap | 14 | (2) |
| Total | | 253 | (16) |

Managerial career
- 2015–2016: VV VIOD Doetinchem
- 2016–2017: De Graafschap (youth)
- 2016–2017: De Graafschap (U19 assistant)
- 2017–2019: De Graafschap (U19)
- 2019–2020: Almere City (U19)
- 2020–2022: Almere City (assistant)
- 2021: Almere City (caretaker)
- 2022–2024: Helmond Sport (assistant)
- 2022: Helmond Sport (caretaker)
- 2025–2026: PEC Zwolle (assistant)
- 2026–: Beveren
- * Club domestic league appearances and goals

Tim Bakens (born 2 November 1982) is a Dutch coach and retired footballer who played as a centre back. He is the manager of Belgian Pro League club Beveren.

== Club career ==
Bakens is a tall central defender who was born in Groesbeek and made his debut in professional football, being part of the De Graafschap squad in the 2001–02 season. He joined FC Volendam from RKC Waalwijk in 2008. He joined Sparta Rotterdam in June 2009. In December 2009 Bakens left Sparta after a conflict about the way of working. In January 2010 he signed with FC Volendam until the end of the season. At the end of the season, he signed with Swiss side St. Gallen. After two seasons, Bakens returned to the Netherlands and signed with SC Cambuur, with which he promoted to the Eredivisie. However, he decided to leave the champion as a free agent. In July 2013, he signed a one-year deal with his former team De Graafschap which plays in the Dutch Eerste Divisie. In June 2014, Bakens had to retire from professional football due to a chronic hip injury.

== Coaching career ==
In June 2025, he became an assistant coach at PEC Zwolle to Henry van der Vegt, alongside Scott Calderwood.

On 18 June 2026, Bakens was hired by Beveren in the Belgian top tier for one season.
