= Romano Postema =

Dutch footballer (born 2002)

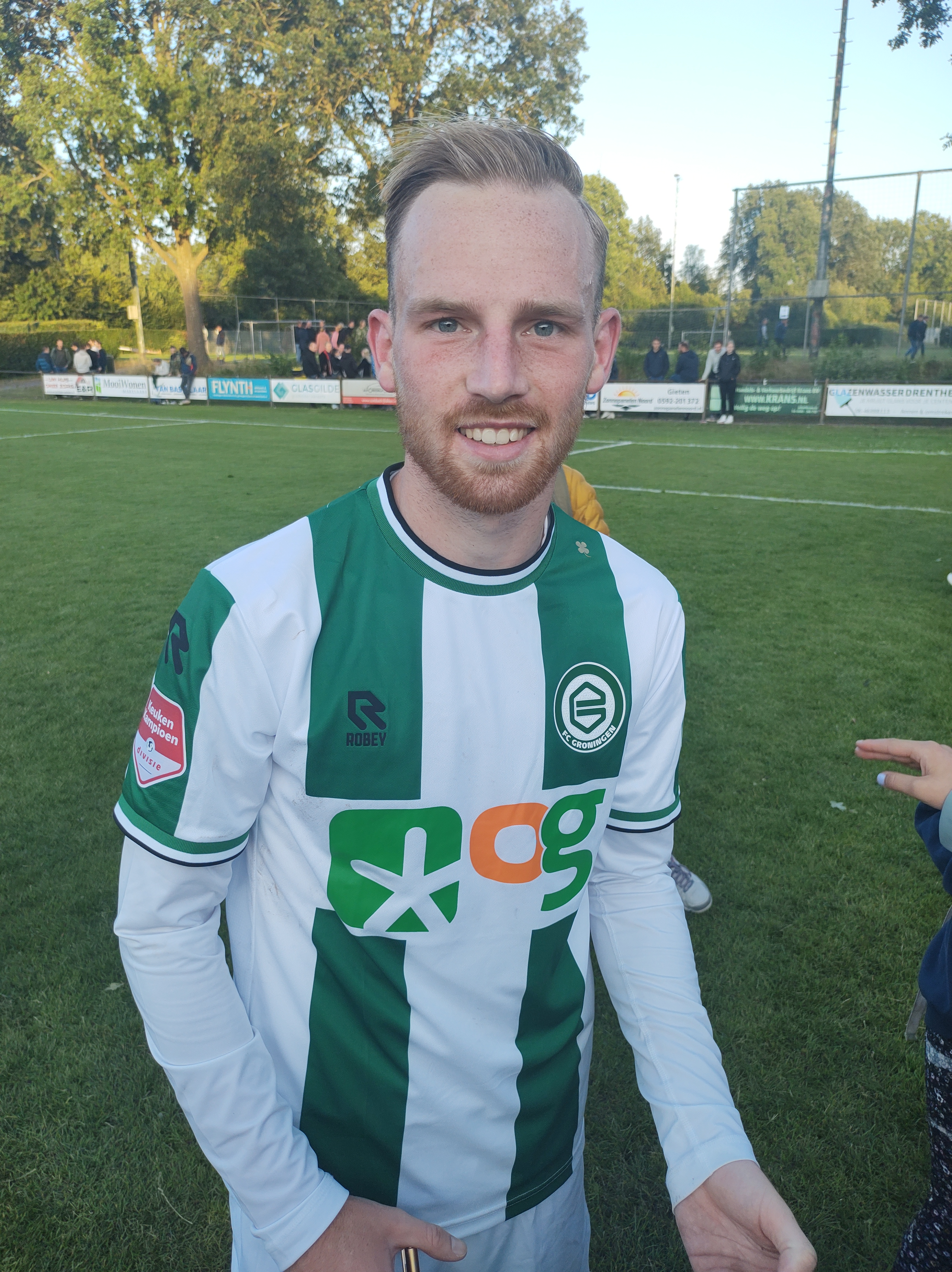
- Postema with Groningen in 2023

Personal information
- Full name: Romano Ceciel Postema
- Date of birth: 7 February 2002 (age 24)
- Place of birth: Groningen, Netherlands
- Height: 1.75 m (5 ft 9 in)
- Position: Forward

Team information
- Current team: Viking
- Number: 11

Youth career
- 2008–2009: DIO Groningen
- 2009–2013: GVAV-Rapiditas
- 2013–2019: Groningen

Senior career*
Years	Team	Apps	(Gls)
2019–2026	Groningen	112	(24)
2020–2021	→ Den Bosch (loan)	27	(10)
2022–2023	→ Roda JC (loan)	31	(5)
2025–2026	→ Emmen (loan)	35	(24)
2026–	Viking	7	(0)

International career
2019	Netherlands U17	1	(0)
2019	Netherlands U18	1	(0)
- * Club domestic league appearances and goals as of 09:53, 12 November 2026 (UTC)

Romano Ceciel Postema (born 7 February 2002) is a Dutch professional footballer who plays as a forward for Eliteserien club Viking.

== Club career ==
=== Groningen ===
Postema was born in Groningen, Netherlands, and has stated that he had a passion for football from a young age: "I was always playing football on the street. Before and after school, I was only focused on one thing and that was a ball. My brother and I were always out on the street playing football. It was a fun learning experience," he recalls. He began playing organised football for hometown clubs DIO Groningen and GVAV-Rapiditas before joining FC Groningen's academy in 2013. He signed his first professional contract on 6 March 2019, having made a strong impression in the under-17 league where he managed to net 24 goals in 18 matches under the guidance of coach Paul Matthijs, as well as seven goals in two U17 cup games. Later that year, on 31 August, Postema made his professional debut in a 3–1 Eredivisie loss to Heracles Almelo, coming on as a substitute for Amir Absalem.

==== Loan to Den Bosch ====
On 22 May 2020, Postema extended his contract with Groningen until 2024. However, on 6 October 2020, he was loaned out to second-tier Eerste Divisie club FC Den Bosch for the remainder of the 2020–21 season. During a league match against Roda JC on 23 April 2021, Postema scored a hat-trick, strongly contributing to his team's 7–0 victory.

==== Return to Groningen, loan to Roda JC ====
Postema returned to Groningen for the 2021–22 season, and on 27 October 2021, he stood out during a KNVB Cup match against Helmond Sport by scoring two goals and helping his team win 4–0. On 12 March 2022, he came off the bench in the 78th minute and made an impressive impact, scoring his first two goals for Groningen and helping the team secure a thrilling 4–3 victory over NEC. He scored six goals in 35 total appearances for the club that season, mainly as a substitute.

At the start of the 2022–23 season, Postema played for Groningen, but on 31 August 2022, he was loaned out to Roda JC in the second tier, until the end of the season. He immediately made an impact for the club, scoring a late equaliser in a 1–1 derby draw against MVV on 4 September 2022. Postema scored six goals and provided two assists in 32 competitive appearances for Roda and returned to recently relegated Groningen at the end of the season.

==== Breakout season and promotion ====
After returning to Groningen following his loan spell at Roda JC, Postema immediately established himself as a starter in head coach Dick Lukkien's side. In the first league game upon his return, on 11 August 2024 against Jong Ajax, Postema scored a header to help Groningen to a 4–1 home victory. On 26 January 2024, he scored his first brace in a 4–1 league win over Jong AZ. He then scored consecutive braces on 4 and 8 March, leading Groningen to 4–1 and 3–0 league victories against Den Bosch and MVV, respectively. On 15 March, he scored a hat-trick in Groningen's 4–2 Eredivisie win over De Graafschap. His performances meant that he was voted Player of the Period of Period 4.

Postema finished the season with 20 goals in 40 appearances, including eight goals in five games in March 2024. His contributions were key in securing Groningen's promotion back to the Eredivisie.

==== Loan to Emmen ====
On 21 July 2025, Postema moved on loan to Emmen.

=== Viking ===
On 2 July 2026, Postema signed a contract with Norwegian Eliteserien club Viking.

== International career ==
Postema was selected for the Netherlands U17 national team's squad for the 2019 FIFA U-17 World Cup, but made only one 93rd-minute substitute appearance for Sontje Hansen in the group stage as the Netherlands finished fourth.

== Style of play ==
Postema has been described as a hard-working striker, who during his time with Groningen became a fan favourite. Postema himself has stated that he likes to play with space behind the opponent's defense so that he can be sent through on goal. He is also willing to use any means necessary to win, including diving if it means winning a game. Upon joining Roda JC on loan in 2022, head coach Jurgen Streppel described Postema as a "technically skilled player with a keen sense for scoring goals."

== Career statistics ==
As of match played 8 November 2026

Appearances and goals by club, season and competition
Club	Season	League			National cup		Other		Total	
Club	Season	Division	Apps	Goals	Apps	Goals	Apps	Goals	Apps	Goals
Groningen	2019–20	Eredivisie	11	0	1	0	—		12	0
Groningen	2020–21	Eredivisie	3	0	—		—		3	0
Groningen	2021–22	Eredivisie	32	4	3	2	—		35	6
Groningen	2022–23	Eredivisie	2	0	—		—		2	0
Groningen	2023–24	Eerste Divisie	35	18	5	3	—		40	21
Groningen	2024–25	Eredivisie	29	2	2	0	—		31	2
Groningen	Total		112	24	11	5	—		123	29
Den Bosch (loan)	2020–21	Eerste Divisie	27	10	1	2	—		28	12
Roda JC (loan)	2022–23	Eerste Divisie	31	5	1	1	—		32	6
Emmen (loan)	2025–26	Eerste Divisie	35	24	0	0	—		35	24
Viking	2026	Eliteserien	7	0	2	0	1 (Note: Appearance(s) in UEFA Champions League)	0	10	0
Career total			212	63	15	8	1	0	228	71

== Honours ==
Individual

- Eerste Divisie top goalscorer: 2025–26
