= Sven Bouland =

Dutch footballer (born 2006)

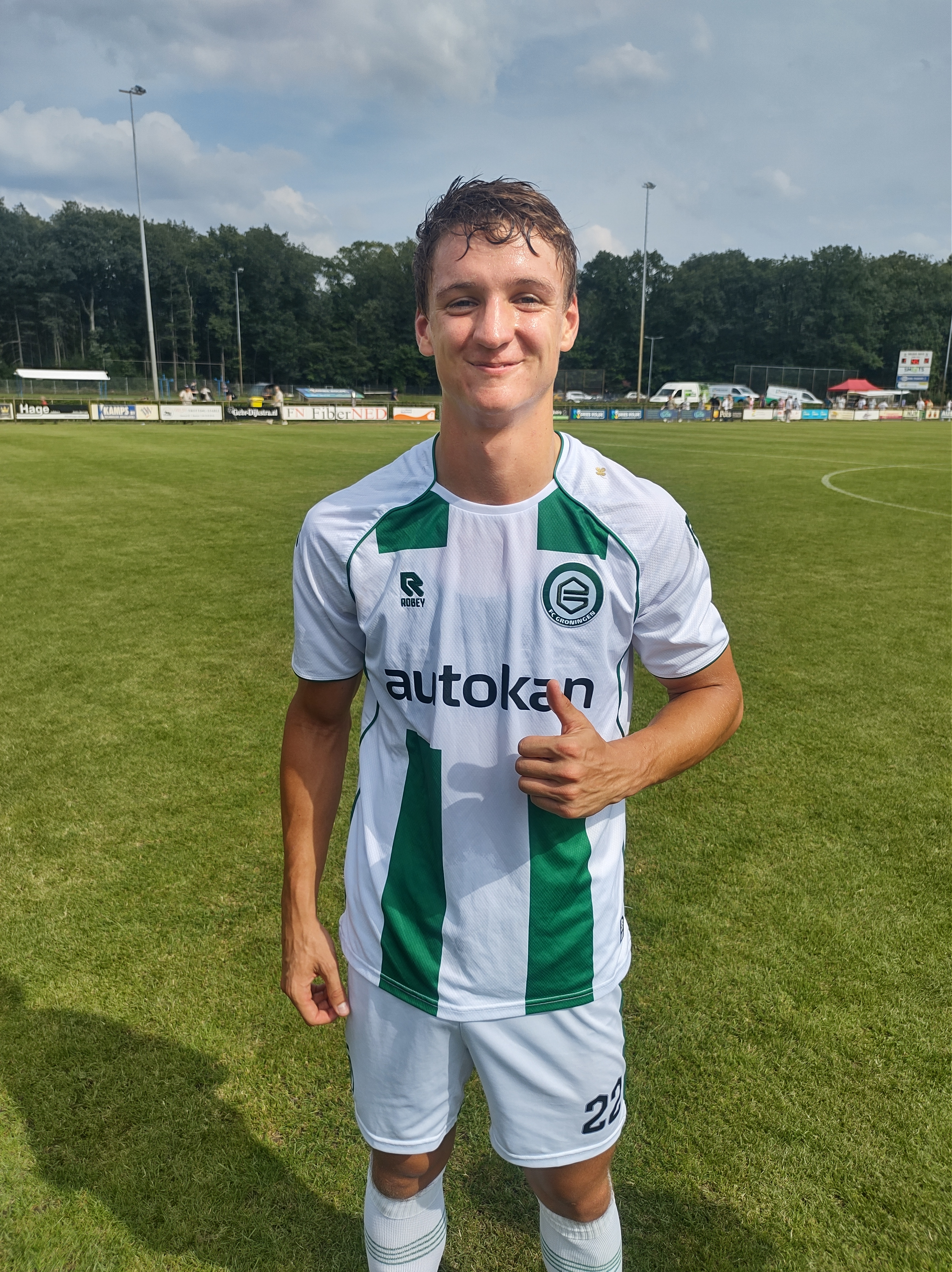
- Sven Bouland in 2025

Personal information
- Date of birth: 22 February 2006 (age 20)
- Place of birth: Oosterwolde, Netherlands
- Position: Defender

Team information
- Current team: MVV Maastricht
- Number: 22

Youth career
- JV Oostenburg
- 2017–2024: Groningen

Senior career*
Years	Team	Apps	(Gls)
2024–2026	Groningen	2	(0)
2026–	MVV Maastricht	7	(0)

International career^{‡}
2024	Netherlands U18	2	(0)
2024	Netherlands U19	4	(0)
- * Club domestic league appearances and goals as of 3 October 2026 ‡ National team caps and goals as of 19 November 2024

Sven Bouland (born 22 February 2006) is a Dutch professional footballer who plays as a defender for Eerste Divisie club MVV Maastricht.

== Club career ==
Bouland was scouted by Groningen from JV Oostenburg in Oosterwolde and progressed through the club's youth academy.

On 5 June 2024, Bouland signed his first professional contract with Groningen at the age of 18.

He made his professional debut on 9 August 2024 in the opening match of the Eredivisie season against NAC Breda, a 4–1 victory. He came on at half-time as a substitute for Marvin Peersman.

On 19 August 2026, Bouland moved to MVV Maastricht with a three-year contract.

== International career ==
Bouland has represented the Netherlands at youth international level. He played in UEFA European Under-19 Championship qualifying matches for the Netherlands U19 against Kazakhstan and Ukraine.

Against Kazakhstan, he came on as a substitute for Givairo Read, while against Ukraine he started the match before being substituted at half-time for Mats Rots.

== Career statistics ==
Appearances and goals by club, season and competition
Club	Season	League			KNVB Beker		Other		Total	
Club	Season	Division	Apps	Goals	Apps	Goals	Apps	Goals	Apps	Goals
FC Groningen	2024–25	Eredivisie	2	0	0	0	0	0	2	0
FC Groningen	2025–26	Eredivisie	0	0	0	0	0	0	0	0
Career total			2	0	0	0	0	0	2	0
