= Leandro Bacuna =

Curaçaoan footballer (born 1991)

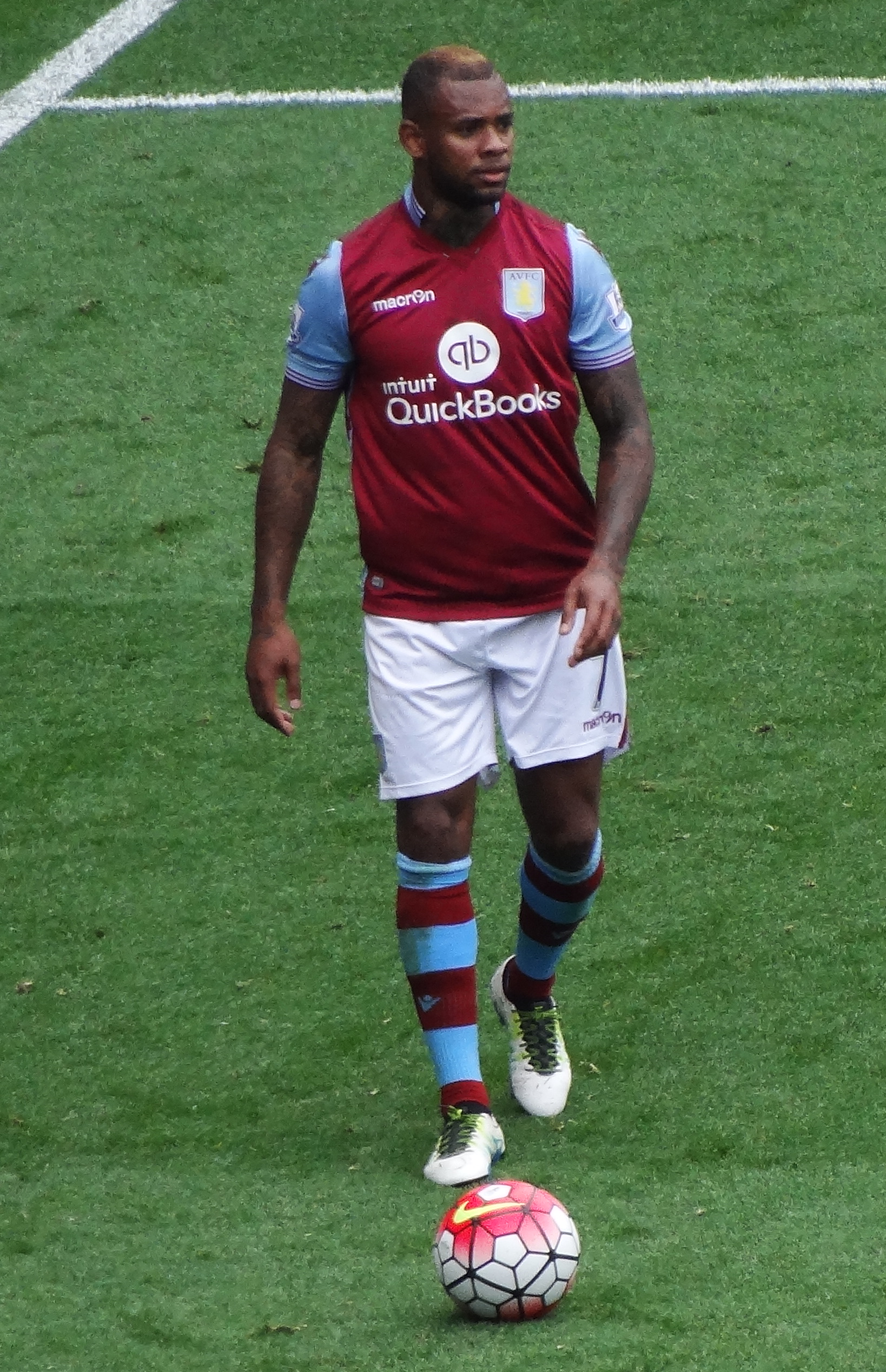
- Bacuna playing for Aston Villa in 2016

Personal information
- Full name: Leandro Jones Johan Bacuna
- Date of birth: 21 August 1991 (age 35)
- Place of birth: Groningen, Netherlands
- Height: 1.87 m (6 ft 2 in)
- Positions: Midfielder; right-back

Team information
- Current team: Iğdır FK
- Number: 10

Youth career
- 2002–2009: Groningen

Senior career*
Years	Team	Apps	(Gls)
2009–2013	Groningen	109	(14)
2013–2017	Aston Villa	116	(7)
2017–2019	Reading	59	(4)
2019–2022	Cardiff City	111	(4)
2022–2023	Watford	14	(0)
2023–2025	Groningen	64	(5)
2025	Bandırmaspor	19	(6)
2026–	Iğdır FK	26	(4)

International career^{‡}
2007–2008	Netherlands Antilles U20	5	(3)
2009–2010	Netherlands U19	10	(1)
2011–2013	Netherlands U21	10	(1)
2016–	Curaçao	81	(17)
- * Club domestic league appearances and goals as of 18:53, 19 November 2026 (UTC) ‡ National team caps and goals as of 15 November 2026 (UTC)

Leandro Jones Johan Bacuna (born 21 August 1991) is a professional footballer who plays as a midfielder or right-back for TFF First League club Iğdır FK. Born in the Netherlands, he represents and captains the Curaçao national team. He is their joint most-capped player along with Eloy Room.

== Club career ==
=== Groningen ===
On 30 October 2009, Bacuna made his first team debut for Groningen in an Eredivisie match against PSV. Bacuna has also played for Groningen's youth teams. On 6 November 2009, he scored his first goal for the first team in a league match against Heracles Almelo, an eventual 4–1 victory for Groningen.

=== Aston Villa ===
It was announced on 13 June 2013 that Bacuna had signed a three-year contract with Premier League club Aston Villa. Handed the number 7 shirt, Bacuna impressed many with his debut season for the Villans, despite constantly playing out of position at right back. Bacuna scored his first Premier League goal on 28 September at home against Manchester City. His second goal came from a free-kick in the claret and blues' 2–0 victory over Cardiff City. He continued his goalscoring run with goals against West Bromwich Albion, Everton and Norwich.

In the 2014–15 season, Bacuna found it harder to break into the starting line-up, starting just one game in the Premier League. On 15 February 2015, he scored the first of two Villa goals in the fifth round of the FA Cup in a 2–1 win over Leicester City, taking the club into the quarter-finals.

On 20 August 2015, Bacuna signed a new long-term contract with the club.

=== Reading ===
On 13 August 2017, Bacuna moved to Reading, signing a four-year contract. He scored his first goal for Reading in an EFL Cup tie against Millwall on 22 August 2017.

=== Cardiff City ===
On 31 January 2019, Bacuna moved to Premier League side Cardiff City, signing a four-and-a-half-year deal for a transfer fee believed to be around £3 million. On 10 June 2022, Cardiff announced Bacuna would leave the club when his contract expired on 30 June.

=== Watford ===
On 14 December 2022, Bacuna signed for Championship club Watford on a contract until the end of the 2022–23 season.

=== Iğdır FK ===
On 6 January 2026, he was transferred to Iğdır FK, signing a one and half year contract.

== International career ==
Born in the Netherlands to parents of Afro-Curaçaoan descent, Bacuna played for the Netherlands Antilles under-20 side, as well as various youth Dutch teams. He received his first Curaçao national team call-up in March 2016, earning his first cap in a 1–0 loss to Barbados.

Bacuna captained Curaçao in their tournament debut at the 2026 FIFA World Cup.

== Personal life ==
He is the brother of fellow professional football players Juninho Bacuna and Johnsen Bacuna. Leandro and Juninho both played as starting midfielders for Curaçao in the 2026 World Cup.

== Career statistics ==
=== Club ===
As of match played 20 November 2026

Appearances and goals by club, season and competition
Club	Season	League			National cup		League cup		Other		Total	
Club	Season	Division	Apps	Goals	Apps	Goals	Apps	Goals	Apps	Goals	Apps	Goals
Groningen	2009–10	Eredivisie	20	2	2	1	—		2 (Note: Appearance(s) in Eredivisie play-offs)	0	24	3
Groningen	2010–11	Eredivisie	24	0	3	0	—		4	2	31	2
Groningen	2011–12	Eredivisie	32	7	1	0	—		0	0	33	7
Groningen	2012–13	Eredivisie	33	5	3	0	—		2	0	38	5
Groningen	Total		109	14	9	1	—		7	2	125	17
Aston Villa	2013–14	Premier League	35	5	1	0	2	0	—		38	5
Aston Villa	2014–15	Premier League	19	0	4	1	1	0	—		24	1
Aston Villa	2015–16	Premier League	31	1	2	0	2	0	—		35	1
Aston Villa	2016–17	Championship	30	1	1	0	0	0	—		31	1
Aston Villa	2017–18	Championship	1	0	0	0	0	0	0	0	1	0
Aston Villa	Total		116	7	8	1	5	0	0	0	129	8
Reading	2017–18	Championship	33	1	3	0	2	1	—		38	2
Reading	2018–19	Championship	26	3	0	0	2	0	—		28	3
Reading	Total		60	4	3	0	4	1	—		66	5
Cardiff City	2018–19	Premier League	11	0	0	0	0	0	—		11	0
Cardiff City	2019–20	Championship	41	1	2	0	0	0	2 (Note: Appearance(s) in Championship play-offs)	0	45	1
Cardiff City	2020–21	Championship	41	2	1	0	1	0	—		43	2
Cardiff City	2021–22	Championship	15	1	0	0	0	0	—		15	1
Cardiff City	Total		109	4	2	0	1	0	2	0	114	4
Watford	2022–23	Championship	14	0	1	0	0	0	—		15	0
Groningen	2023–24	Eerste Divisie	33	1	5	0	—		—		38	1
Groningen	2024–25	Eredivisie	31	4	2	1	—		—		33	5
Groningen	Total		64	5	7	1	—		—		71	6
Bandırmaspor	2025–26	TFF First League	19	6	0	0	—		—		19	6
Iğdır FK	2025–26	TFF First League	16	3	3	0	—		—		19	3
Iğdır FK	2026–27	TFF First League	10	1	0	0	—		—		10	1
Iğdır FK	Total		26	4	3	0	—		—		29	4
Career total			515	43	37	7	10	1	9	2	566	49

=== International ===
As of match played 15 November 2026

Appearances and goals by national team and year
National team	Year	Apps	Goals
Curaçao	2016	6	4
Curaçao	2017	9	1
Curaçao	2018	5	4
Curaçao	2019	11	2
Curaçao	2021	8	2
Curaçao	2022	5	1
Curaçao	2023	6	0
Curaçao	2024	7	1
Curaçao	2025	11	1
Curaçao	2026	12	1
Total		81	17

As of match played 15 November 2026. Curaçao score listed first, score column indicates score after each Bacuna goal.

International goals by date, venue, cap, opponent, score, result and competition
No.	Date	Venue	Cap	Opponent	Score	Result	Competition
1	7 June 2016	Ergilio Hato Stadium, Willemstad, Curaçao	4	U.S. Virgin Islands	4–0	7–0	2017 Caribbean Cup qualification
2	5 October 2016	Ergilio Hato Stadium, Willemstad, Curaçao	5	Antigua and Barbuda	1–0	3–0	2017 Caribbean Cup qualification
3	11 October 2016	Juan Ramón Loubriel Stadium, Bayamón, Puerto Rico	6	Puerto Rico	2–2	4–2	2017 Caribbean Cup qualification
4	11 October 2016	Juan Ramón Loubriel Stadium, Bayamón, Puerto Rico	6	Puerto Rico	4–2	4–2	2017 Caribbean Cup qualification
5	10 October 2017	Jassim Bin Hamad Stadium, Doha, Qatar	15	Qatar	1–1	2–1	Friendly
6	26 March 2018	Ergilio Hato Stadium, Willemstad, Curaçao	17	Bolivia	1–0	1–0	Friendly
7	10 September 2018	Ergilio Hato Stadium, Willemstad, Curaçao	18	Grenada	4–0	10–0	2019–20 CONCACAF Nations League qualification
8	10 September 2018	Ergilio Hato Stadium, Willemstad, Curaçao	18	Grenada	7–0	10–0	2019–20 CONCACAF Nations League qualification
9	12 October 2018	IMG Academy, Bradenton, United States	19	U.S. Virgin Islands	3–0	5–0	2019–20 CONCACAF Nations League qualification
10	5 June 2019	Chang Arena, Buriram, Thailand	22	India	3–1	3–1	2019 King's Cup
11	21 June 2019	BBVA Stadium, Houston, United States	25	Honduras	1–0	1–0	2019 CONCACAF Gold Cup
12	28 March 2021	Estadio Doroteo Guamuch Flores, Guatemala City, Guatemala	33	Cuba	1–0	2–1	2022 FIFA World Cup qualification
13	5 June 2021	Estadio El Trébol, Guatemala City, Guatemala	34	British Virgin Islands	3–0	8–0	2022 FIFA World Cup qualification
14	6 June 2022	Estadio Olímpico Metropolitano, San Pedro Sula, Honduras	41	Honduras	1–0	2–1	2022–23 CONCACAF Nations League A
15	9 September 2024	Kirani James Athletic Stadium, St. George's, Grenada	53	Saint Martin	3–0	4–0	2024–25 CONCACAF Nations League B
16	13 November 2025	Bermuda National Stadium, Devonshire Parish, Bermuda	67	Bermuda	1–0	7–0	2026 FIFA World Cup qualification
17	27 September 2026	Ergilio Hato Stadium, Willemstad, Curaçao	77	Nicaragua	3–0	6–1	2026–27 CONCACAF Nations League A

== Honours ==
Aston Villa

- FA Cup runner-up: 2014–15

Curaçao

- Caribbean Cup: 2017
- King's Cup: 2019
