= Dave Kwakman =

Dutch footballer (born 2004)

Personal information
- Full name: Dave Jacobus Hendrikus Maria Kwakman
- Date of birth: 7 August 2004 (age 22)
- Place of birth: Volendam, The Netherlands
- Height: 1.84 m (6 ft 0 in)
- Position: Midfielder

Team information
- Current team: AZ
- Number: 21

Youth career
- RKAV Volendam
- 2015–2021: AZ

Senior career*
Years	Team	Apps	(Gls)
2022–	Jong AZ	60	(1)
2023–	AZ	23	(1)
2025	→ Groningen (loan)	15	(2)
2026	→ Volendam (loan)	10	(0)

International career^{‡}
2021–2022	Netherlands U18	7	(0)
2022	Netherlands U19	3	(0)
2025–	Netherlands U21	4	(0)
- * Club domestic league appearances and goals as of 25 October 2026 ‡ National team caps and goals as of 6 October 2026

Dave Jacobus Hendrikus Maria Kwakman (born 7 August 2004) is a Dutch footballer who plays as a midfielder for Eredivisie club AZ.

== Early life ==
Kwakman comes from Volendam and lived a few houses away from fellow professional Joey Veerman growing up. Kwakman started playing under-12 football for RKAV Volendam.

== Club career ==
Kwakman signed his first contract with AZ Alkmaar in March 2021 keeping him to the club until the summer of 2024. He was part of the AZ under-18 side that won a league and cup double in the 2021–22 season.

Kwakman made his professional debut for Jong AZ on the 5 September, 2022 against FC Dordrecht at home in the Eerste Divisie in a 3–1 victory.

In April 2023 he played in the 2022-23 UEFA Youth League final against Hajduk Split as AZ ran out 5–0 winners.

On 20 January 2025, Kwakman moved on loan to Groningen.

On 11 January 2026, he was loaned by his hometown club Volendam.

== International career ==
In March 2020 he was called up to the Dutch under-16 squad. In September 2022 Kwakman was representing the Dutch U19 team.

== Career statistics ==
As of match played 25 October 2026

Appearances and goals by club, season and competition
Club	Season	League			Cup		Europe		Other		Total	
Club	Season	Division	Apps	Goals	Apps	Goals	Apps	Goals	Apps	Goals	Apps	Goals
Jong AZ	2022–23	Eerste Divisie	16	0	—		—		—		16	0
Jong AZ	2023–24	Eerste Divisie	28	1	—		—		—		28	1
Jong AZ	2024–25	Eerste Divisie	10	0	—		—		—		10	0
Jong AZ	Total		54	1	—		—		—		54	1
AZ	2023–24	Eredivisie	3	0	—		—		—		3	0
AZ	2024–25	Eredivisie	5	0	2	0	3 (Note: Appearances in UEFA Europa League)	0	—		10	0
AZ	2025–26	Eredivisie	6	0	0	0	6 (Note: Appearances in UEFA Conference League)	0	—		12	0
AZ	2026–27	Eredivisie	9	1	0	0	3	0	1 (Note: Appearance in Johan Cruyff Shield)	0	13	1
AZ	Total		23	1	2	0	12	0	1	0	38	1
Groningen (loan)	2024–25	Eredivisie	15	2	—		—		—		15	2
Volendam (loan)	2025–26	Eredivisie	10	0	2	0	—		2 (Note: Appearances in relegation play-offs)	0	14	0
Career total			102	4	4	0	12	0	3	0	121	4

== Honours ==
AZ

- Johan Cruyff Shield: 2026
