= Brynjólfur Willumsson =

Icelandic footballer

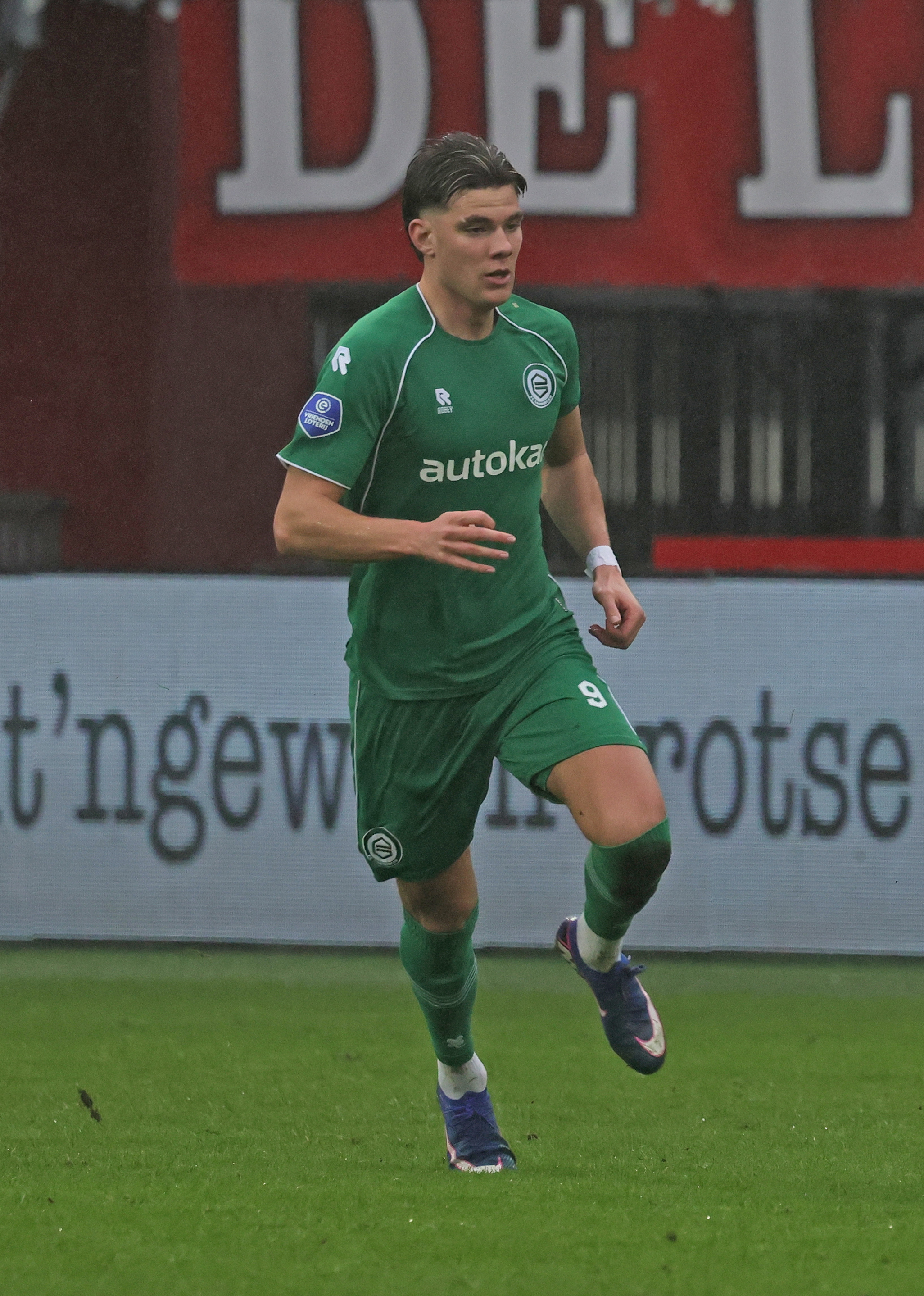
- Willumsson with Groningen in 2026

Personal information
- Full name: Brynjólfur Andersen Willumsson
- Birth name: Brynjólfur Darri Willumsson
- Date of birth: 12 August 2000 (age 26)
- Place of birth: Kópavogur, Iceland
- Height: 1.85 m (6 ft 1 in)
- Position: Forward

Team information
- Current team: Groningen
- Number: 9

Youth career
- –2017: Breiðablik

Senior career*
Years	Team	Apps	(Gls)
2018–2021	Breiðablik	41	(7)
2021–2024	Kristiansund	74	(12)
2024–	Groningen	60	(15)

International career^{‡}
2016	Iceland U16	3	(0)
2017	Iceland U18	3	(1)
2018	Iceland U19	4	(1)
2019–2022	Iceland U21	25	(5)
2024–	Iceland	14	(2)
- * Club domestic league appearances and goals as of 19 May 2026 ‡ National team caps and goals as of 16 November 2026

Brynjólfur Andersen Willumsson (born Brynjólfur Darri Willumsson; 12 August 2000) is an Icelandic professional footballer who plays as a forward for Eredivisie club Groningen and the Iceland national team.

== Club career ==
Coming through the youth ranks of Breiðablik, he played three seasons for the senior team and was a prolific Icelandic youth international. Internationally, he was a squad member for the 2021 UEFA European Under-21 Championship.

After being scouted by Kenneth Leren, he was signed by Norwegian side Kristiansund BK in March 2021. He made his Eliteserien debut in May 2021 against Molde.

On 27 June 2024, Brynjólfur signed with Groningen in the Netherlands for three seasons, with an option for a fourth.

== International career ==
Brynjólfur made his debut for the senior Iceland national team on 13 January 2024 in a friendly against Guatemala.

== Personal life ==
Brynjólfur is the son of Willum Þór Þórsson, a former football player and manager, current member of the Icelandic parliament and Minister of Health since 2021. He is the brother of fellow footballer Willum Þór Willumsson, who plays for Birmingham City.

== Career statistics ==
=== Club ===
As of match played 14 September 2024

Appearances and goals by club, season and competition
Club	Season	League			National cup (Note: Includes Icelandic Cup, KNVB Cup)		League cup		Europe		Other		Total	
Club	Season	Division	Apps	Goals	Apps	Goals	Apps	Goals	Apps	Goals	Apps	Goals	Apps	Goals
Breiðablik	2018	Besta deild karla	7	0	2	1	—		—		—		9	1
Breiðablik	2019	Besta deild karla	17	3	4	0	5	1	1 (Note: Appearance in UEFA Europa League)	0	—		27	4
Breiðablik	2020	Besta deild karla	17	4	2	2	3	0	1	0	—		23	6
Breiðablik	2021	Besta deild karla	0	0	0	0	3	1	0	0	—		3	1
Breiðablik	Total		41	7	8	3	11	2	2	0	—		62	12
Kristiansund	2021	Eliteserien	21	0	2	3	—		—		—		23	3
Kristiansund	2022	Eliteserien	25	4	3	1	—		—		—		28	5
Kristiansund	2023	Norwegian First Division	20	7	1	0	—		—		—		21	7
Kristiansund	2024	Eliteserien	8	1	2	1	—		—		—		10	2
Kristiansund	Total		74	12	8	5	—		—		—		82	17
Groningen	2024–25	Eredivisie	29	4	0	0	—		0	0	0	0	29	4
Career total			119	21	16	8	11	2	2	0	0	0	148	31

=== International ===
As of match played 16 November 2026

Appearances and goals by national team and year
National team	Year	Apps	Goals
Iceland	2024	2	1
Iceland	2025	5	0
Iceland	2026	7	1
Total		14	2

Scores and results list Iceland's goal tally first.

List of international goals scored by Brynjólfur Willumsson
No.	Date	Venue	Opponent	Score	Result	Competition
1	17 January 2024	DRV PNK Stadium, Fort Lauderdale, United States	Honduras	1–0	2–0	Friendly
2	16 November 2026	Laugardalsvöllur, Reykjavík, Iceland	Luxembourg	1–0	3–0	2026–27 UEFA Nations League C

== Honours ==
Individual

- Eredivisie Player of the Month: August 2025
