= Thijmen Blokzijl =

Dutch footballer (born 2005)

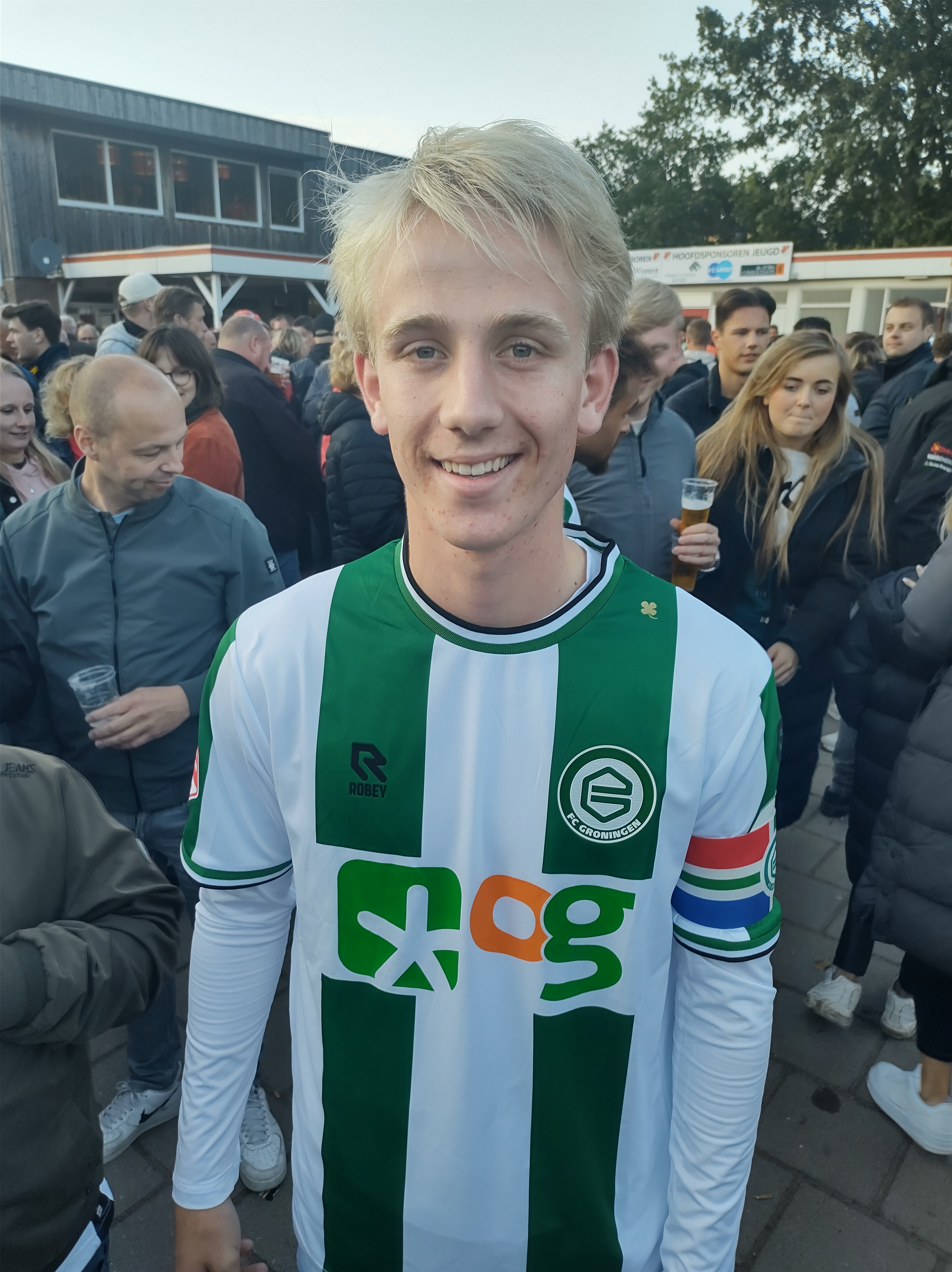
- Blokzijl in 2023 with Groningen

Personal information
- Date of birth: 25 February 2005 (age 21)
- Place of birth: Groningen, Netherlands
- Height: 1.90 m (6 ft 3 in)
- Position: Centre-back

Team information
- Current team: Groningen
- Number: 3

Youth career
- 2010–2015: Velocitas 1897
- 2015–2016: Be Quick 1887
- 2016–2021: Groningen

Senior career*
Years	Team	Apps	(Gls)
2021–	Groningen	102	(2)

International career^{‡}
2020	Netherlands U15	3	(0)
2021–2022	Netherlands U17	15	(0)
2022–2023	Netherlands U18	4	(0)
2023–	Netherlands U19	6	(0)
Medal record
Men's football
Representing Netherlands
UEFA European Under-17 Championship
Runner-up	2022 Israel
- * Club domestic league appearances and goals as of 19 May 2026 ‡ National team caps and goals as of 26 March 2024

Thijmen Blokzijl (born 25 February 2005) is a Dutch professional footballer who plays as a centre-back for Eredivisie club Groningen.

== Club career ==
Blokzijl joined the youth teams of Groningen at the age of 11 and was first called up to the senior squad in May 2021.

Blokzijl made his Eredivisie debut for Groningen on 8 January 2023, in a game against Excelsior. On 14 May 2025, he scored his first goal for Groningen during stoppage time in a 2–2 draw against Ajax, causing the latter to drop to second place in the league with one match remaining.

== International career ==
He represented Netherlands at the 2022 UEFA European Under-17 Championship, where they were the runners-up.

== Career statistics ==
As of match played 16 March 2025

Appearances and goals by club, season and competition
Club	Season	League			National cup		Other		Total	
Club	Season	Division	Apps	Goals	Apps	Goals	Apps	Goals	Apps	Goals
Groningen	2022–23	Eredivisie	15	0	1	0	—		16	0
Groningen	2023–24	Eerste Divisie	25	0	1	0	—		26	0
Groningen	2024–25	Eredivisie	20	0	2	0	—		22	0
Career total			60	0	4	0	0	0	64	0

== Honours ==
Individual

- Eredivisie Team of the Month: January 2025
