= Henry van der Vegt =

Dutch footballer

Personal information
- Date of birth: 18 February 1972 (age 54)
- Place of birth: Kampen, Netherlands
- Position: Midfielder

Youth career
- DOS Kampen

Senior career*
| Years | Team | Apps | (Gls) |
| 1991–1995 | Zwolle | 123 | (23) |
| 1995–1998 | Willem II | 73 | (14) |
| 1998–2001 | Udinese | 15 | (1) |
| Total | | 211 | (38) |

Managerial career
- 2025–2026: PEC Zwolle
- * Club domestic league appearances and goals

Henry van der Vegt (born 18 February 1972) is a Dutch football coach and former player.

== Playing career ==
Born in Kampen, Van der Vegt played as a midfielder for DOS Kampen, FC Zwolle, Willem II and Udinese. He retired from playing in 2001, following problems with his heart.

== Coaching career ==
In June 2019, he was appointed assistant coach to John Stegeman at PEC Zwolle, after having formerly worked as technical director, general manager, and youth coach with the club. In 2024 he obtained his VC5 UEFA training diploma. He was promoted to head coach in May 2025, assisted by Scott Calderwood and Tim Bakens.

On 13 October 2026, van der Vegt was dismissed by PEC Zwolle after starting the 2026–27 Eredivisie season with 1 win and 4 points in the first 8 games.
