= Tika de Jonge =

Dutch association football player (born 2003)

Personal information
- Date of birth: 11 March 2003 (age 23)
- Place of birth: Zierikzee
- Height: 1.73 m (5 ft 8 in)
- Position: Midfielder

Team information
- Current team: FC Groningen
- Number: 8

Youth career
- -2020: NAC Breda
- 2020-2023: FC Groningen

Senior career*
Years	Team	Apps	(Gls)
2023-	Groningen	58	(4)
- * Club domestic league appearances and goals as of 19 May 2026

Tika de Jonge (born 11 March 2003) is a Dutch professional footballer who plays as a midfielder for Eredivisie side FC Groningen.

== Career ==
He was born and raised in Zierikzee. He was a youth player at NAC Breda prior to joining FC Groningen in the summer of 2020. He began to be integrated into the Groningen first team squad in 2023, scoring in a preseason friendly against De Graafschap in July 2023. He made his league debut for Groningen in the Eerste Divisie against De Graafschap on 20 October 2023. With Groningen he finished the 2023–24 season with promotion to the Eredivisie. In July 2024, he signed a contract extension with the club, keeping him at Groningen until 2026.
