= Stije Resink =

Dutch association football player (born 2003)

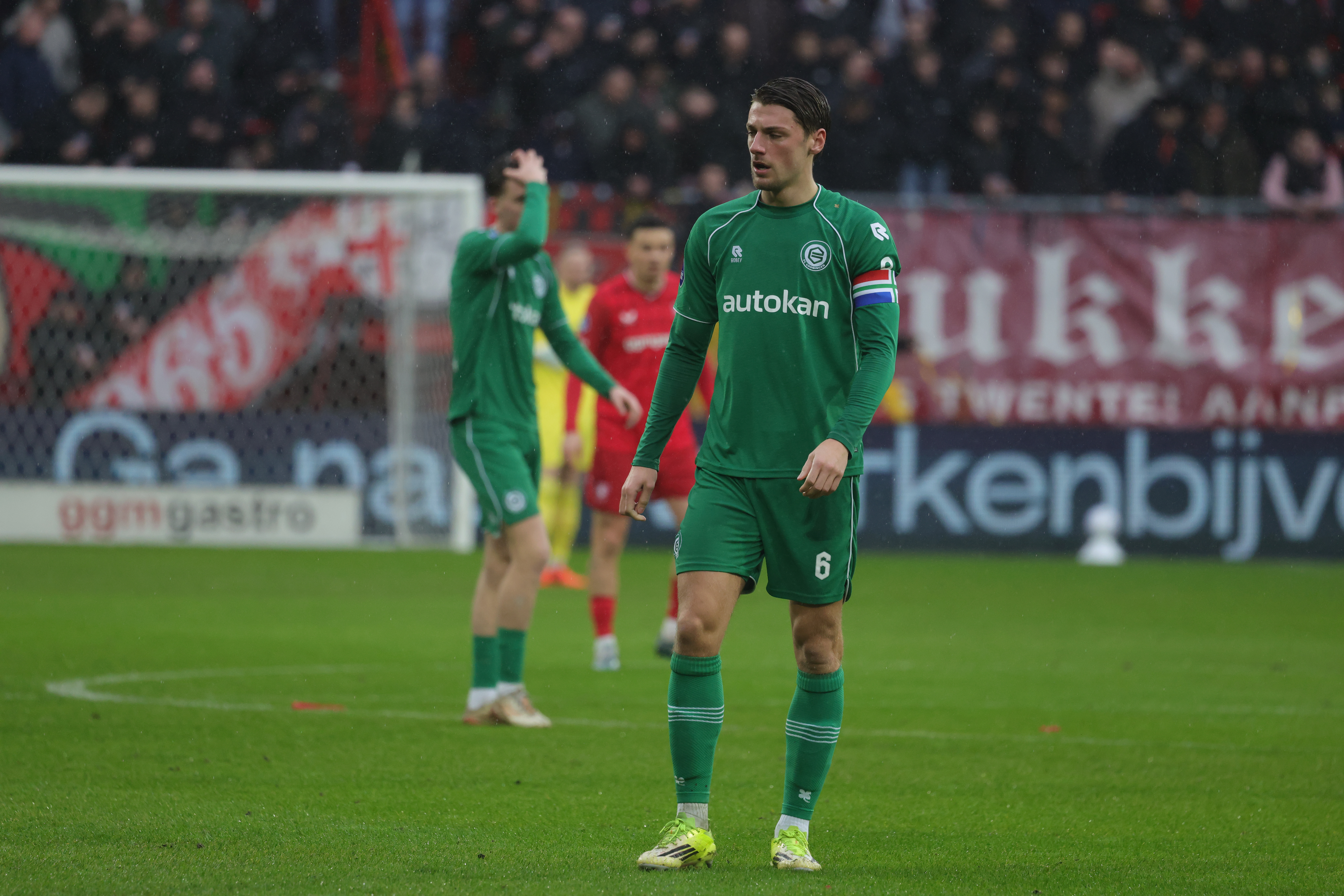
- Resink in 2026

Personal information
- Full name: Stije Resink
- Date of birth: 23 May 2003 (age 23)
- Place of birth: Amsterdam
- Height: 1.86 m (6 ft 1 in)
- Position: Midfielder

Team information
- Current team: AZ
- Number: 16

Youth career
- –2021: Almere City

Senior career*
Years	Team	Apps	(Gls)
2021–2024	Almere City	96	(5)
2024–2026	Groningen	50	(10)
2026–	AZ	0	(0)
- * Club domestic league appearances and goals as of 19 May 2026

Stije Resink (born 28 May 2003) is a Dutch professional footballer who plays as a midfielder for Eredivisie club AZ.

== Career ==
He is a product of the Almere City youth system. He made 32 Eredivisie appearances for Almere City during the 2023–24 season, a year after he helped the club achieved promotion to the Eerste Divisie. He also captained the club on occasion that season.

In August 2024, he signed for FC Groningen for a fee in excess of €1 million, a record sale for Almere. He scored his first goal for the club in a 5–1 win in the KNVB Cup against VV Kolping Boys on 29 October 2024.
