= Finn Stam =

Dutch footballer (born 2003)

Personal information
- Date of birth: 13 April 2003 (age 23)
- Place of birth: Zaandam, The Netherlands
- Height: 1.88 m (6 ft 2 in)
- Position: Centre-back

Team information
- Current team: Willem II
- Number: 3

Senior career*
| Years | Team | Apps | (Gls) |
| 2022–2026 | Jong AZ | 62 | (4) |
| 2024–2026 | AZ | 1 | (0) |
| 2024–2025 | → Groningen (loan) | 19 | (0) |
| 2025–2026 | → Willem II (loan) | 19 | (1) |
| 2026– | Willem II | 0 | (0) |
- * Club domestic league appearances and goals as of 28 April 2026

Finn Stam (born 13 April 2003) is a Dutch professional footballer who plays as a centre-back for Eredivisie club Willem II.

== Career ==
Stam initially played as a striker before being converted into a central defender for AZ's under-15 team. He signed his first professional contract with AZ on 19 June 2021. In July 2021, he played in the Future of Football Cup, a friendly tournament in which FIFA trialled rule changes including kick-ins, rolling substitutions, 30-minute stop-clock halves, and sin-bins. He made his Eerste Divisie debut on 18 March 2022, away at Jong FC Utrecht.

On 10 July 2024, Stam joined Groningen on a season-long loan.

On 15 August 2025, Stam moved to Willem II on loan, with an option to buy. He broke into the starting line-up towards the end of the season and featured prominently as Willem II won promotion to the Eredivisie through the play-offs. On 28 May 2026, Willem II exercised the option and signed him to a three-year contract.
