= Wouter Prins =

Dutch association football player (born 2004)

Personal information
- Full name: Wouter Mattjihs Prins
- Date of birth: 6 February 2004 (age 22)
- Place of birth: Winschoten, Groningen
- Height: 1.70 m (5 ft 7 in)
- Position: Defender

Team information
- Current team: FC Groningen
- Number: 2

Youth career
- VV Bellingwolde
- VV Noordster
- –2015: VV Hoogezand
- 2015–2023: FC Groningen

Senior career*
Years	Team	Apps	(Gls)
2023–	Groningen	62	(1)
- * Club domestic league appearances and goals as of 19 May 2026

Wouter Matthijs Prins (born 6 February 2004) is a Dutch professional footballer who plays as a defender for Eredivisie side FC Groningen.

== Career ==
He joined FC Groningen in 2015 and played through the youth teams at the club. He made his league debut for Groningen against De Graafschap on 20 October 2023. The following month, he signed a new four-year contract with the club.

== Style of play ==
A left back, he also has the ability to deliver a long throw, which has been utilised by Groningen to get the ball into the penalty area from a throw-in.
