= Marco Rente =

German footballer (born 1997)

Personal information
- Date of birth: 25 February 1997 (age 29)
- Place of birth: Siegen, Germany
- Height: 1.87 m (6 ft 2 in)
- Position: Centre-back

Team information
- Current team: Groningen
- Number: 5

Youth career
- JSG Kirchen
- –2011: SG Betzdorf
- 2011–2015: Sportfreunde Siegen

Senior career*
Years	Team	Apps	(Gls)
2015–2017	Sportfreunde Siegen	44	(2)
2017–2018	TuS Erndtebrück	33	(4)
2018–2020	Borussia Dortmund II	46	(3)
2020–2023	Heracles Almelo	83	(4)
2023–	Groningen	99	(9)
- * Club domestic league appearances and goals as of 21:39, 14 October 2026 (UTC)

Marco Rente (born 25 February 1997) is a German professional footballer who plays as a centre-back for Eredivisie club Groningen.

== Club career ==
Rente made his professional debut for Heracles Almelo in the Eredivisie on 27 September 2020, starting in the home match against PSV Eindhoven.

On 9 June 2023, Rente signed a four-year contract with Groningen.

== Honours ==
Heracles Almelo

- Eerste Divisie: 2022–23
