= Jorg Schreuders =

Dutch footballer (born 2004)

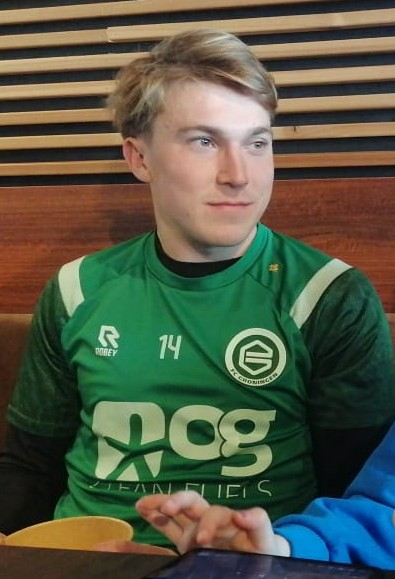

Personal information
- Date of birth: 9 September 2004 (age 22)
- Place of birth: Singapore
- Height: 1.77 m (5 ft 10 in)
- Position: Midfielder

Team information
- Current team: FC Groningen
- Number: 14

Youth career
- –2015: Be Quick 1887
- 2015–2023: FC Groningen

Senior career*
Years	Team	Apps	(Gls)
2023–	FC Groningen	100	(11)

International career^{‡}
2025–	Netherlands U21	3	(0)
- * Club domestic league appearances and goals as of 19 May 2026 ‡ National team caps and goals as of 18 November 2025

Jorg Schreuders (born 9 September 2004) is a Dutch professional footballer who plays as a midfielder for FC Groningen. Born in Singapore, he represents the Netherlands under-21 side.

== Club career ==
=== Early career ===
Born in Singapore, Schreuders began playing in the youth of Be Quick 1887 and joined the FC Groningen youth academy in 2015. In 2022, he signed his first professional contract with FC Groningen for two years until June 2024, with an additional year extension. At the end of 2022 he was called up for the senior team to join them in their mid-season training camp in Spain.

=== FC Groningen ===
On 15 April 2023, Schreuders made his first team debut, against RKC Waalwijk. He started as a substitution, but he got subbed on during the second half for Tomáš Suslov. Two weeks later, on his second appearance, he debuted as a starter, against Go Ahead Eagles. He started as a right-back, because first choice right back Damil Dankerlui was injured. FC Groningen drew against Go Ahead Eagles, which meant that they were officially demoted to the Keuken Kampioen Divisie.

In March 2024 FC Groningen decided to make use of Schreuders' contract option for a further year, which meant that his contract will expire in June 2025. In the end of the 2023–24 season, FC Groningen got promoted back to the Eredivisie after a thrilling last match day against Roda JC Kerkrade for a direct promotion. Schreuders scored the second goal.

== International career ==
On 10 October 2025, Schreuders made his debut for the Netherlands U21 team in a 0–0 draw against Bosnia and Herzegovina in Sarajevo.

== Career statistics ==
As of match played 16 March 2025

Appearances and goals by club, season and competition
Club	Season	League			National cup		Other		Total	
Club	Season	Division	Apps	Goals	Apps	Goals	Apps	Goals	Apps	Goals
FC Groningen	2022–23	Eredivisie	5	0	—				5	0
FC Groningen	2023–24	Eerste divisie	29	5	5	0	—		34	5
FC Groningen	2024–25	Eredivisie	23	3	2	0	—		25	3
Career total			57	5	7	0	—		64	5

== Honours ==
Individual

- Eredivisie Talent of the Month: August 2024
- Eredivisie Team of the Month: August 2024
