= Dick Lukkien =

Dutch footballer and manager

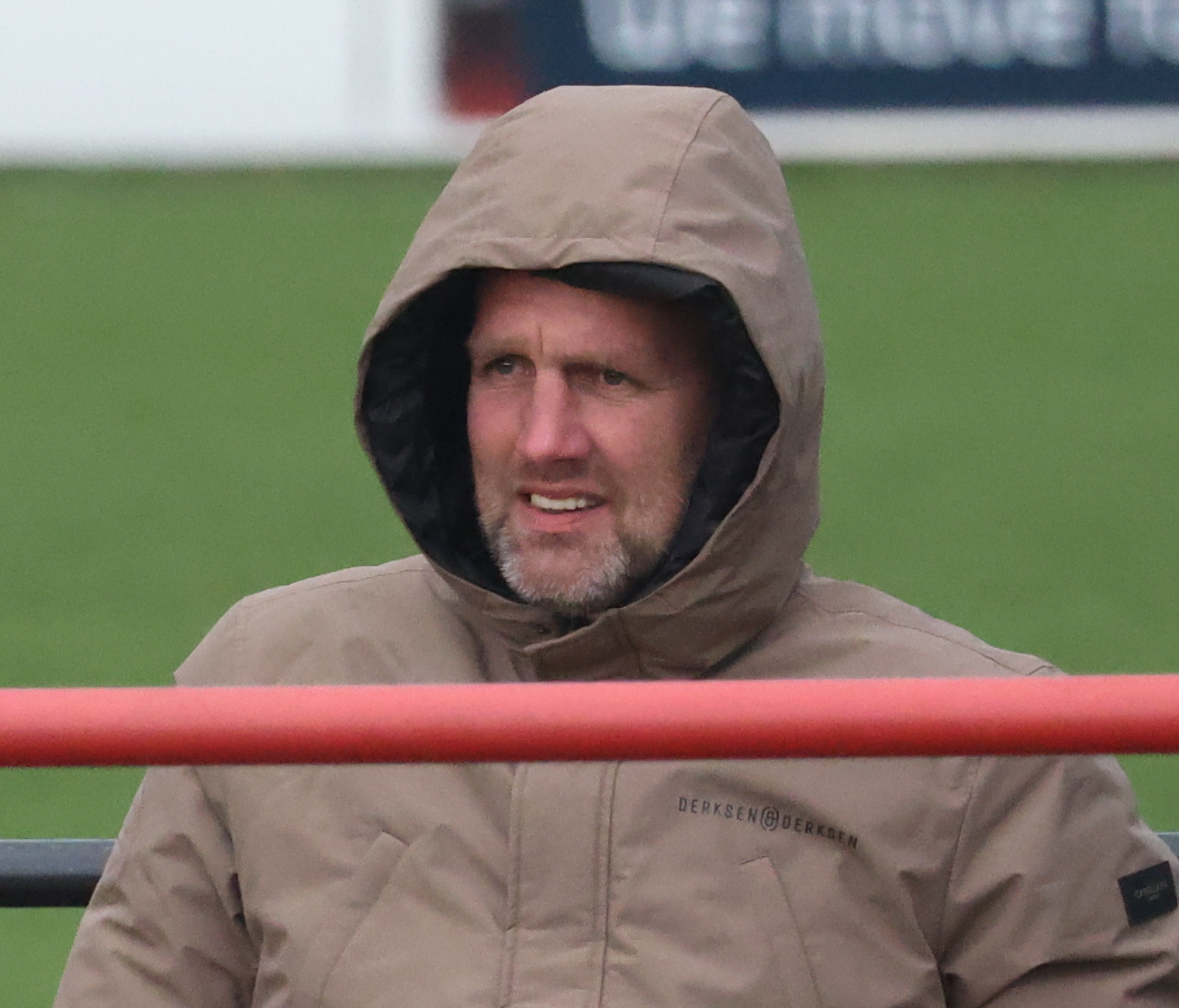
- Lukkien in 2023

Personal information
- Date of birth: 28 March 1972 (age 54)
- Place of birth: Winschoten, Netherlands
- Position: Defender

Team information
- Current team: FC Groningen (head coach)

Senior career*
Years	Team	Apps	(Gls)
1991–1996	BV Veendam	90	(1)

Managerial career
- 2016–2023: FC Emmen
- 2023–: FC Groningen
- * Club domestic league appearances and goals

Dick Lukkien (born 28 March 1972) is a Dutch football manager and former footballer currently in charge of Eredivisie club FC Groningen.

== Playing career ==
From 1991 to 1996 he played 90 times and scored once for BV Veendam. He then played for SVBO and Appingedam.

== Coaching career ==
=== BV Veendam ===
Lukkien was the assistant manager at SC Veendam from 2002 to 2010.

=== Jong FC Groningen ===
Lukkien became head coach and managed Jong FC Groningen from 2010 to 2013.

=== FC Groningen ===
In July 2011 he was appointed assistant manager. Groningen won the KNVB Cup in 2015 and finished runner-up in the Johan Cruyff Shield the same year. He extended his contract to 2018.

=== FC Emmen ===
On 14 March 2016 it was announced that Lukkien would be the manager of FC Emmen for the next two seasons. He won the Bronzen Stier for being the best manager in the third period of the 2017/18 season. Emmen were promoted to the Eredivisie for the first time in 2018 and finished fourteenth the following season. In 2020–21, Emmen relegated back to the Eerste Divisie.

On 15 April 2022, Lukkien and Emmen promoted back to the Eredivisie after just one year absence. However, FC Emmen immediately relegated too, losing to Almere City in the Relegation play-offs.

=== FC Groningen ===
In March 2023, it was announced that Lukkien would return to FC Groningen, as head coach for the 2023–24 season. Both FC Emmen and FC Groningen got relegated from the Eredivisie after the announcement.

== Managerial statistics ==
As of 11 June 2023

Team	From	To	Record				
Team	From	To	G	W	D	L	Win %
Jong FC Groningen	7 July 2010	6 June 2013	55	29	10	16	52.73
Emmen	7 July 2016	11 June 2023	268	98	66	104	36.57
Groningen	1 July 2023	present	115	51	24	40	44.35
Total			438	178	100	160	40.64

== Honours ==
Individual

- Eredivisie Manager of the Month: September 2025, March 2026
