= 2021–22 FC Groningen season =

FC Groningen
2021–22 season
- Owner: FC Groningen Beheer B.V.
- Chairman: Erik Mulder
- Head coach: Danny Buijs
- Stadium: Euroborg
- Eredivisie: 12th
- KNVB Cup: Round of 16
- Top goalscorer: League: Jørgen Strand Larsen (14); All: Jørgen Strand Larsen (17)
- Highest home attendance: 22,525 (vs. Ajax, 2 April 2022)
- Lowest home attendance: 0 (several games with restricted attendance, due to COVID-19 government measures)
- Average home league attendance: 11,921
- Biggest win: 4–0 (against Helmond Sport(h) in KNVB Cup)
- Biggest defeat: 5–2 (against PSV Eindhoven(a)) and 3–0 (against AFC Ajax(a), NEC Nijmegen(a) and FC Twente(a)) in Eredivisie
Home colours	Away colours	Third colours
- All statistics correct as of 18 September 2024.

The 2021–22 season is the 66th season in the existence of FC Groningen and the club's 55th (22nd consecutive) season in the top flight of Dutch football.

In addition to the domestic league, FC Groningen participated in this season's edition of the KNVB Cup.

FC Groningen finished 2021–22 Eredivisie season as 12th.

In the KNVB Cup, FC Groningen lost 2–1 against NEC Nijmegen in round of 16 and are eliminated from the cup.

Jørgen Strand Larsen was the top scorer of the club in this season with 17 goals; 14 goals in Eredivisie and 3 goals in KNVB Cup. (His 2nd consecutive.)

Jørgen Strand Larsen (31E-3K), Neraysho Kasanwirjo (31E-3K), Peter Leeuwenburgh (33E-1K) and Romano Postema (31E-3K) were the most appeared players in this season with 34 appearances.

== Players ==
=== First-team squad ===
As of 12 July 2021

Note: Flags indicate national team as defined under FIFA eligibility rules; some limited exceptions apply. Players may hold more than one non-FIFA nationality.

No.	Pos.	Nation	Player
1	GK	NED	Peter Leeuwenburgh
2	DF	SUR	Damil Dankerlui
3	DF	NED	Bart van Hintum
4	DF	NED	Wessel Dammers
5	DF	NED	Mike te Wierik
6	MF	NED	Azor Matusiwa
7	MF	SWE	Ramon Pascal Lundqvist
8	FW	NED	Michael de Leeuw
9	FW	NOR	Jørgen Strand Larsen
10	FW	NED	Arjen Robben (captain)
11	FW	MAR	Mohamed El Hankouri
12	DF	NED	Radinio Balker
14	FW	NED	Patrick Joosten
15	FW	SWE	Gabriel Gudmundsson
16	GK	NED	Jan Hoekstra

No.	Pos.	Nation	Player
17	MF	SVK	Tomáš Suslov
18	MF	MAR	Ahmed El Messaoudi
19	FW	SWE	Paulos Abraham
20	DF	CRO	Marin Sverko
21	DF	NED	Neraysho Kasanwirjo
22	DF	NED	Joël van Kaam
23	FW	NED	Kian Slor
24	DF	NED	Thomas Poll
25	GK	NED	Jan de Boer
26	MF	NED	Daniël van Kaam
27	FW	BEL	Cyril Ngonge
29	FW	NED	Romano Postema
30	MF	GER	Sam Schreck
33	MF	SWE	Alex Mortensen

== Transfers ==
=== In ===
Pos.	Player	Transferred from	Fee	Date
GK	Jan Hoekstra (NED)	Roda JC Kerkrade (NED)	End of loan	30 Jun 2021
MF	Nicklas Strunck (DEN)	Esbjerg fB (DEN)	End of loan	30 Jun 2021
FW	Romano Postema (NED)	FC Den Bosch (NED)	End of loan	30 Jun 2021
FW	Alex Mortensen (SWE)	Kalmar FF (SWE)	On loan	1 Jul 2021
DF	Marin Šverko (CRO)	1. FC Saarbrücken (GER)	400,000	1 Jul 2021
FW	Michael de Leeuw (NED)	FC Emmen (NED)	Free	1 Jul 2021
FW	Paulos Abraham (SWE)	AIK Fotboll (SWE)	2,000,000	1 Jul 2021
DF	Radinio Balker (SUR)	Almere City FC (NED)	Free	1 Jul 2021
DF	Neraysho Kasanwirjo (NED)	Ajax U21 (NED)	Free	1 Jul 2021
GK	Peter Leeuwenburgh (NED)	Cape Town City (RSA)	Undisclosed	1 Jul 2021
FW	Cyril Ngonge (BEL)	RKC Waalwijk (NED)	€200,000	2 Jul 2021
FW	Daleho Irandust (SYR)	BK Häcken (SWE)	€400,000	31 Aug 2021
DF	Elias Olsson (SWE)	Kalmar FF (SWE)	On loan	31 Aug 2021
MF	Laros Duarte (CPV)	Sparta Rotterdam (NED)	€675,000	31 Aug 2021
FW	Sebastian Tounekti (TUN)	FK Bodø/Glimt (NOR)	On loan	31 Aug 2021
DF	Yahya Kalley (SWE)	IFK Göteborg (SWE)	€400,000	31 Aug 2021
DF	Melayro Bogarde (NED)	TSG 1899 Hoffenheim (GER)	On loan	14 Jan 2022
MF	Emmanuel Matuta (BEL)	PSV U21 (NED)	Undisclosed	20 Jan 2022

=== Out ===
Pos.	Player	Transferred to	Fee	Date
FW	Paulos Abraham (SWE)	AIK Fotboll (SWE)	End of loan	30 Jun 2021
DF	Leonel Miguel (NED)	FC Emmen (NED)	Free	1 Jul 2021
MF	Nicklas Strunck (DEN)	Esbjerg fB (DEN)	Free	1 Jul 2021
MF	Sam Schreck (GER)	FC Erzgebirge Aue (GER)	On loan	28 Jul 2021
MF	Ramon Pascal Lundqvist (SWE)	Panathinaikos F.C. (GRE)	On loan	26 Aug 2021
MF	Azor Matusiwa (NED)	Stade de Reims (FRA)	€4,000,000	31 Aug 2021
FW	Gabriel Gudmundsson (SWE)	Lille OSC (FRA)	€6,000,000	31 Aug 2020
FW	Kian Slor (NED)	FC Emmen (NED)	On loan	31 Aug 2021
FW	Joël van Kaam (NED)	FC Emmen (NED)	On loan	31 Aug 2021
DF	Thomas Poll (NED)	Almere City FC (NED)	€100,000	31 Aug 2021
MF	Ahmed El Messaoudi (MAR)	Gaziantep F.K. (TUR)	€400,000	7 Sep 2021
FW	Patrick Joosten (NED)	SC Cambuur (NED)	On loan	11 Jan 2022
DF	Wessel Dammers (NED)	Willem II (NED)	On loan	29 Jan 2022

== Pre-season and friendlies ==
Win Draw Loss Fixtures

3 July 2021 Friendly	Pelikaan-S (Netherlands)	1–4	(Netherlands) FC Groningen	Netherlands
15:30 CEST (UTC+2)

9 July 2021 Friendly	FC Groningen (Netherlands)	Cancelled	(Netherlands) FC Emmen	Netherlands
19:00 CEST (UTC+2)

10 July 2021 Friendly	Genk (Belgium)	1–1	(Netherlands) FC Groningen	Belgium
14:00 CEST (UTC+2)

16 July 2021 Friendly	SC Verl (Germany)	3–2	(Netherlands) FC Groningen	Ankum, Germany
18:00 CEST (UTC+2)				Stadium: Quitt-Stadion

17 July 2021 Friendly	VfL Osnabrück (Germany)	0–1	(Netherlands) FC Groningen	Ankum, Germany
15:00 CEST (UTC+2)				Stadium: Quitt-Stadion

31 July 2021 Friendly	Almere City (Netherlands)	0–1	(Netherlands) FC Groningen	Netherlands
13:00 CEST (UTC+2)

31 July 2021 Friendly	Borussia Mönchengladbach (Germany)	2–1	(Netherlands) FC Groningen	Mönchengladbach, Germany
15:30 CEST (UTC+2)	Stindl 15'; Matusiwa 40' (o.g.); Wolf (yellow card) 58'	Report	Matusiwa (yellow card) 27'; De Leeuw 48'	Stadium: Borussia-Park

6 August 2021 Friendly	FC Groningen (Netherlands)	1–1	(Italy) Venezia	Groningen, Netherlands
18:30 CEST (UTC+2)				Stadium: Euroborg

== Competitions ==
=== Overall record ===
Competition	First match	Last match	Starting round	Final position	Record							
Competition	First match	Last match	Starting round	Final position	Pld	W	D	L	GF	GA	GD	Win %
Eredivisie	15 August 2021	15 May 2022	Week 1	12th	34	9	9	16	41	55	−14	26.47
KNVB Cup	27 October 2021	19 January 2022	1st round	Round of 16	3	2	0	1	9	3	+6	66.67
Total					37	11	9	17	50	58	−8	29.73

Source: Soccerway

=== Eredivisie ===
==== League table ====
Pos	Team	Pld	W	D	L	GF	GA	GD	Pts
10	RKC Waalwijk	34	9	11	14	40	51	−11	38
11	NEC	34	10	8	16	38	52	−14	38
12	Groningen	34	9	9	16	41	55	−14	36
13	Go Ahead Eagles	34	10	6	18	37	51	−14	36
14	Sparta Rotterdam	34	8	11	15	30	48	−18	35

Source: Eredivisie
Rules for classification: Season in progress: 1) Most points won; 2) Less points lost; 3) Goal difference; 4) Goals scored; 5) Alphabetical order; End of season: 1) Points; 2) Goal difference; 3) Goals scored; 4) Head-to-head points; 5) Head-to-head goal difference; 6) Head-to-head away goals scored; 7) Play-off if relevant for deciding champion, relegation or participating in a European league, otherwise by draw. 8) Penalty shoot-out (only after a play-off)

==== Results summary ====
Overall								Home						Away					
Pld	W	D	L	GF	GA	GD	Pts	W	D	L	GF	GA	GD	W	D	L	GF	GA	GD
34	9	9	16	41	55	−14	36	4	6	7	18	21	−3	5	3	9	23	34	−11

Source: ESPN

==== Results by round ====
Round	1	2	3	4	5	6	7	8	9	10	11	12	13	14	15	16	17	18	19	20	21	22	23	24	25	26	27	28	29	30	31	32	33	34
Ground	A	H	A	H	A	H	A	H	A	H	A	H	A	A	H	H	A	A	H	A	H	H	A	H	A	H	A	H	A	H	A	H	A	H
Result	W	D	L	D	L	L	L	D	D	W	L	D	W	W	D	D	L	L	L	W	W	L	D	W	D	W	W	L	L	L	L	L	L	L
Position	6	6	11	11	14	15	16	15	16	15	15	15	14	13	12	11	12	12	13	11	10	10	10	10	10	8	8	8	8	8	8	10	11	12

Source: Eredivisie
A = Away; H = Home; W = Win; D = Draw; L = Loss

==== Matches ====
The league fixtures were announced on 11 June 2021.

===== 1st half =====
15 August 2021 Week 1	SC Cambuur	1–2	FC Groningen	Leeuwarden
12:15 CEST (UTC+2)	Maulun 67'	Report	El Messaoudi 32'; Strand Larsen 90+2'	Stadium: Cambuur Stadion; Attendance: 7,000; Referee: Allard Lindhout

21 August 2021 Week 2	FC Groningen	0–0	FC Utrecht	Groningen
21:00 CEST (UTC+2)	Kasanwirjo (yellow card) 57'; Matusiwa (yellow card) 74'; Suslov (yellow card) 75'	Report	Q. Timber (yellow card) 45'; Ter Avest (yellow card) 57'; Kerk (yellow card) 75'; W. Janssen (yellow card) 88'	Stadium: Euroborg; Attendance: 14,800; Referee: Danny Makkelie

28 August 2021 Week 3	PSV	5–2	FC Groningen	Eindhoven
20:00 CEST (UTC+2)	Gakpo 7'; El Hankouri 27' (o.g.); Ramalho 45+7'; Zahavi 55'; Bruma 90+7', (yellow card) 90+8'	Report	Ngonge 15', 18'	Stadium: Philips Stadion; Attendance: 23,447; Referee: Serdar Gözübüyük

12 September 2021 Week 4	FC Groningen	1–1	SC Heerenveen	Groningen
14:30 CEST (UTC+2)	Duarte (yellow card) 59'; Ngonge 68'; Te Wierik (yellow card) 71' (yellow-red card) 84'	Report	Halilović 19', (yellow card) 70'; Madsen (yellow card) 44'; Woudenberg (yellow card) 79'; Stevanović (yellow card) 90+2'	Stadium: Euroborg; Attendance: 15,000; Referee: Rob Dieperink

18 September 2021 Week 5	Willem II	2–1	FC Groningen	Tilburg
18:45 CEST (UTC+2)	Wriedt 5', (yellow card) 66'; Saddiki (yellow card) 7', (goal) 24'Llonch (yellow card) 54'	Report	Van Hintum (yellow card) 19'; Suslov 61'; Ngonge (yellow card) 68', (red card) 90+5'	Stadium: Koning Willem II Stadion; Attendance: 9,463; Referee: Jeroen Manschot

22 September 2021 Week 6	FC Groningen	0–1	Vitesse	Groningen
20:00 CEST (UTC+2)	Te Wierik (red card) 36'; Van Kaam (red card) 45+5'	Report	Gboho 45+3'; Bero (yellow card) 51'; Tannane (yellow card) 61'; Rasmussen (yellow card) 90+3'	Stadium: Euroborg; Attendance: 14,963; Referee: Allard Lindhout

25 September 2021 Week 7	Ajax	3–0	FC Groningen	Amsterdam
18:45 CEST (UTC+2)	Álvarez 40'; Antony 56'; Mazraoui 81'	Report	Suslov (yellow card) 36'	Stadium: Johan Cruyff Arena; Attendance: 53,148; Referee: Pol van Boekel

1 October 2021 Week 8	FC Groningen	1–1	FC Twente	Groningen
20:00 CEST (UTC+2)	Ngonge 8', (yellow card) 72'; Van Hintum (yellow card) 49'; El Hankouri (yellow card) 59'	Report	Zerrouki (yellow card) 68'; Ugalde 74', (yellow card) 89'; Everink (yellow card) 79'; Oosterwolde (yellow card) 90+6'	Stadium: Euroborg; Attendance: 16,250; Referee: Martin van den Kerkhof

17 October 2021 Week 9	Sparta Rotterdam	1–1	FC Groningen	Rotterdam
14:30 CEST (UTC+2)	Auasaar (yellow card) 5'; B. Smeets 33', (yellow card) 36'; Okoye (yellow card) 36'; Abels (yellow card) 79'	Report	Ngonge 28', (yellow card) 36'; Suslov (yellow card) 88'	Stadium: Het Kasteel; Attendance: 9,038; Referee: Serdar Gözübüyük

24 October 2021 Week 10	FC Groningen	2–0	AZ	Groningen
20:00 CEST (UTC+2)	Ngonge 20'; Suslov (yellow card) 62'; De Leeuw 71'	Report	Chatzidiakos (yellow card) 43'; Guðmundsson (yellow card) 65'; Reijnders (yellow card) 72'	Stadium: Euroborg; Attendance: 11,300; Referee: Danny Makkelie

31 October 2021 Week 11	N.E.C.	3–0	FC Groningen	Nijmegen
14:30 CET (UTC+2)	Akman 45+1'; Tavşan 55'; Okita 90+2'	Report	Ngonge (yellow card) 70'; Dammers (yellow card) 81'	Stadium: Goffertstadion; Attendance: 0 Referee: Ingmar Oostrom

7 November 2021 Week 12	FC Groningen	1–1	RKC Waalwijk	Groningen
12:15 CET (UTC+1)	Strand Larsen 85'; Van Hintum (yellow card) 90'	Report	M. Kramer 14'; Touba (yellow card) 34'	Stadium: Euroborg; Attendance: 0 Referee: Kevin Blom

21 November 2021 Week 13	Go Ahead Eagles	0–1	FC Groningen	Deventer
12:15	Rommens (yellow card) 43'; I. Córdoba (yellow card) 57' (yellow-red card) 75'; J. Kramer (yellow card) 70' (yellow-red card) 90+4'; Mulenga (yellow card) 89'	Report	Strand Larsen 50'; Suslov (yellow card) 54'	Stadium: De Adelaarshorst; Attendance: 0 Referee: Sander van der Eijk

27 November 2021 Week 14	Fortuna Sittard	1–4	FC Groningen	Sittard
18:45 CET (UTC+1)	M. Seuntjens 24'; R. Janssen (red card) 63'	Report	Ngonge 29'; Cox 42' (o.g.); Irandust 51'; Strand Larsen 80'; Abraham (yellow card) 90+3'	Stadium: Fortuna Sittard Stadion; Attendance: 0 Referee: Jeroen Manschot

3 December 2021 Week 15	FC Groningen	1–1	PEC Zwolle	Groningen
20:00	Thomas van den Belt 75' (o.g.)	Report	Mees de Wit 14'	Stadium: Euroborg; Attendance: 0

12 December 2021 Week 16	FC Groningen	1–1	Feyenoord	Groningen
14:30	Jorgen Strand Larsen 65'	Report	Marcos Senesi 60'	Stadium: Euroborg; Attendance: 0

18 December 2021 Week 17	Heracles Almelo	4–2	FC Groningen	Almelo
20:00	Bilal Başacıkoğlu 31'; Nikolai Laursen 34'; Orestis Kiomourtzoglou 87'; Neraysho Kasanwirjo 89' (o.g.)	Report	Jorgen Strand Larsen 65'; Romano Postema 78'	Stadium: Erve Asito; Attendance: 0

21 December 2021 Week 18	AZ Alkmaar	1–0	FC Groningen	Alkmaar
21:00	Jesper Karlsson 68'	Report		Stadium: AFAS Stadion; Attendance: 0

===== 2nd half =====
16 January 2022 Week 19	FC Groningen	0–1	PSV	Groningen
14:30 CET (UTC+1)		Report	Götze 10'	Stadium: Euroborg; Referee: Bas Nijhuis

22 January 2022 Week 20	SBV Vitesse	1–3	FC Groningen	Arnhem
18:45	Dominik Oroz 76'	Report	Jørgen Strand Larsen 39'; Michael de Leeuw 67'; Daniël van Kaam 71'	Stadium: GelreDome; Attendance: 0

6 February 2022 Week 21	FC Groningen	2–1	Go Ahead Eagles	Groningen
14:30	Jørgen Strand Larsen 4' 69'	Report		Stadium: Euroborg; Attendance: 6,900

12 February 2022 Week 22	FC Groningen	0–1	Fortuna Sittard	Groningen
18:45		Report	Dimitrios Siovas 82'	Stadium: Euroborg; Attendance: 7,200

20 February 2022 Week 23	PEC Zwolle	1–1	FC Groningen	Zwolle
12:15	Yūta Nakayama 90+4'	Report	Laros Duarte 36'	Stadium: MAC³PARK Stadion; Attendance: 13,620

26 February 2022 Week 24	FC Groningen	1–0	Willem II	Groningen
18:45	Bjorn Meijer 14'	Report		Stadium: Euroborg; Attendance: 17,977

5 March 2022 Week 25	Feyenoord	1–1	FC Groningen	Rotterdam
21:00	Cyriel Dessers 71'	Report	Michael de Leeuw 23'	Stadium: De Kuip; Attendance: 45,395

12 March 2022 Week 26	FC Groningen	4–3	NEC Nijmegen	Groningen
18:45	Michael de Leeuw 2'; Jørgen Strand Larsen 4'; Romano Postema 80' 90+2'	Report	Ali Akman 13'; Lasse Schöne 29'; Magnus Mattsson 32'	Stadium: Euroborg; Attendance: 20,600

20 March 2022 Week 27	FC Utrecht	1–3	FC Groningen	Utrecht
12:15	Bart Ramselaar 48'	Report	Mohamed El Hankouri 4' (pen.); Michael de Leeuw 10'; Jørgen Strand Larsen 89'	Stadium: Stadion Galgenwaard; Attendance: 21,221

2 April 2022 Week 28	FC Groningen	1–3	AFC Ajax	Groningen
16:30	Jørgen Strand Larsen 20'	Report	Davy Klaassen 45+1'; Dušan Tadić 45+7' (pen.); Steven Berghuis 90+1'	Stadium: Euroborg; Attendance: 22,525; Referee: Bas Nijhuis

10 April 2022 Week 29	SC Heerenveen	3–1	FC Groningen	Heerenveen
12:15	Sydney van Hooijdonk 7' 53'; Sven van Beek 80'	Report	Neraysho Kasanwirjo 29'	Stadium: Abe Lenstra Stadion; Attendance: 22,500; Referee: Danny Makkelie

24 April 2022 Week 30	FC Groningen	0–1	Heracles Almelo	Groningen
14:30		Report	Nikolai Laursen 22'	Stadium: Euroborg; Attendance: 20,471; Referee: Edwin Van de Graaf

1 May 2022 Week 31	RKC Waalwijk	3–1	FC Groningen	Waalwijk
20:00	Finn Stokkers 16' 25'; Richard van der Venne 39'	Report	Jørgen Strand Larsen 58'	Stadium: Mandemakers Stadion; Attendance: 6,348; Referee: Serdar Gözübüyük

24 December 2017 Week 32	FC Groningen	1–2	Sparta Rotterdam	Groningen
21:00	Bjorn Meijer 77'	Report	Arno Verschueren 20'; Lennart Thy 57'	Stadium: Euroborg; Attendance: 20,400; Referee: Jeroen Manschot

11 May 2022 Week 33	Twente	3–0	FC Groningen	Enschede
20:00 CEST (UTC+2)	Černý 29'; Limnios 68', 81'	Report		Stadium: De Grolsch Veste; Attendance: 29,100; Referee: Martin van den Kerkhof

15 May 2022 Week 34	FC Groningen	2–3	Cambuur	Groningen
14:30 CEST (UTC+2)	Strand Larsen 58'; Postema 90+2'	Report	Uldriķis 12'; Hoedemakers 50'; Kallon 61' (pen.)	Stadium: Euroborg; Attendance: 21,286; Referee: Rob Dieperink

=== KNVB Cup ===
27 October 2021 First round	FC Groningen	4–0	Helmond Sport	Groningen
21:00 CEST	Romano Postema 19' 37'; Daleho Irandust 21'; Jørgen Strand Larsen 54'	Report		Stadium: Euroborg; Attendance: 8,440

15 December 2021 Second round	Excelsior Rotterdam	2–4 (a.e.t.)	FC Groningen	Rotterdam
20:00 CET(UTC+1)	Reuven Niemeijer 23'; Julian Baas 69'	Report	Cyril Ngonge 45+1'; Mohamed El Hankouri 85' (pen.); Jørgen Strand Larsen 111', 115'	Stadium: Van Donge & De Roo Stadion

19 January 2022 Round of 16	FC Groningen	1–2	NEC Nijmegen	Groningen
18:45 CET(UTC+1)	Michael de Leeuw 45'	Report	Calvin Verdonk 10'; Mikkel Duelund 48'	Stadium: Euroborg; Attendance: 0

== Statistics ==
=== Scorers ===
#	Player	Eredivisie	KNVB	Total
1	(Norway) Jørgen Strand Larsen	14	3	17
2	(Belgium) Cyril Ngonge	7	1	8
3	(Netherlands) Michael de Leeuw	5	1	6
3	(Netherlands) Romano Postema	4	2	6
5	(Netherlands) Bjorn Meijer	2	0	2
5	(Syria) Daleho Irandust	1	1	2
5	(Netherlands) Mohamed El Hankouri	1	1	2
8	(Morocco) Ahmed El Messaoudi	1	0	1
8	(Netherlands) Daniël van Kaam	1	0	1
8	(Cape Verde) Laros Duarte	1	0	1
8	(Netherlands) Neraysho Kasanwirjo	1	0	1
8	(Slovakia) Tomáš Suslov	1	0	1

=== Appearances ===
#	Player	Eredivisie	KNVB	Total
1	(Norway) Jørgen Strand Larsen	31	3	34
1	(Netherlands) Neraysho Kasanwirjo	31	3	34
1	(Netherlands) Peter Leeuwenburgh	33	1	34
1	(Netherlands) Romano Postema	31	3	34
5	(Belgium) Cyril Ngonge	30	3	33
5	(Netherlands) Michael de Leeuw	31	2	33
5	(Netherlands) Mohamed El Hankouri	30	3	33
8	(Netherlands) Bart van Hintum	28	3	31
8	(Slovakia) Tomáš Suslov	28	3	31
10	(Sweden) Paulos Abraham	28	2	30
11	(Cape Verde) Laros Duarte	26	2	28
12	(Suriname) Damil Dankerlui	25	2	27
12	(Netherlands) Mike te Wierik	25	2	27
14	(Netherlands) Bjorn Meijer	22	3	25
14	(Croatia) Marin Sverko	23	2	25
16	(Netherlands) Daniël van Kaam	20	2	22
17	(Netherlands) Wessel Dammers	18	2	20
18	(Syria) Daleho Irandust	18	1	19
19	(Netherlands) Patrick Joosten	10	2	12
20	(Netherlands) Melayro Bogarde	7	1	8
21	(Belgium) Emmanuel Matuta	6	0	6
22	(Sweden) Yahya Kalley	4	0	4
23	(Morocco) Ahmed El Messaoudi	3	0	3
23	(Sweden) Alex Mortensen	2	1	3
23	(Netherlands) Azor Matusiwa	3	0	3
23	(Sweden) Gabriel Gudmundsson	3	0	3
27	(Sweden) Elias Olsson	1	1	2
27	(Netherlands) Jan Hoekstra	0	2	2
29	(Sweden) Ramon Pascal Lundqvist	1	0	1

=== Clean sheets ===
#	Player	Eredivisie	KNVB	Total
1	(Netherlands) Peter Leeuwenburgh	5	1	6
Total		5	1	6

=== Disciplinary record ===
#	Player	Eredivisie		KNVB		Total	
#	Player	Yellow card	Red card	Yellow card	Red card	Yellow card	Red card
1	(Netherlands) Mike te Wierik	3	2	1	0	4	2
2	(Netherlands) Neraysho Kasanwirjo	6	1	1	0	7	1
3	(Belgium) Cyril Ngonge	3	1	0	0	3	1
4	(Netherlands) Daniël van Kaam	0	1	0	0	0	1
5	(Slovakia) Tomáš Suslov	9	0	0	0	9	0
6	(Norway) Jørgen Strand Larsen	5	0	0	0	5	0
6	(Cape Verde) Laros Duarte	3	0	2	0	5	0
8	(Netherlands) Bart van Hintum	4	0	0	0	4	0
9	(Netherlands) Wessel Dammers	3	0	0	0	3	0
10	(Netherlands) Bjorn Meijer	2	0	0	0	2	0
10	(Netherlands) Mohamed El Hankouri	2	0	0	0	2	0
10	(Sweden) Paulos Abraham	2	0	0	0	2	0
10	(Netherlands) Romano Postema	2	0	0	0	2	0
14	(Netherlands) Azor Matusiwa	1	0	0	0	1	0
14	(Syria) Daleho Irandust	1	0	0	0	1	0
14	(Suriname) Damil Dankerlui	1	0	0	0	1	0
14	(Croatia) Marin Sverko	1	0	0	0	1	0
14	(Netherlands) Michael de Leeuw	1	0	0	0	1	0
14	(Netherlands) Peter Leeuwenburgh	1	0	0	0	1	0
14	(Sweden) Yahya Kalley	1	0	0	0	1	0
