= 2020–21 FC Groningen season =

FC Groningen
2020–21 season
- Owner: Fc Groningen Beheer B.V.
- Chairman: Bert Middel
- Manager: Danny Buijs
- Stadium: Euroborg
- Eredivisie: 7th
- KNVB Cup: 2nd round
- Top goalscorer: League: Jørgen Strand Larsen (9); All: Jørgen Strand Larsen (9)
- Highest home attendance: 6,049 (against PSV Eindhoven in Eredivisie)
- Lowest home attendance: 0 (due to COVID-19 pandemic)
- Average home league attendance: 356
- Biggest win: 4-0 (against FC Emmen in Eredivisie)
- Biggest defeat: 3-1 (against PSV Eindhoven, FC Twente, AFC Ajax and RKC Waalwijk) and 2-0 (against Feyenoord and SC Heerenveen) in Eredivisie
Home colours	Away colours	Third colours
- All statistics correct as of 14 September 2024.

The 2020–21 season was the 65th season in existence of FC Groningen and the club's 54th (21st consecutive) season in the top flight of Dutch football. In addition to the domestic league, FC Groningen participated in this season's edition of the KNVB Cup. The season covered the period from 1 July 2020 to 30 June 2021.

FC Groningen finished 2020–21 Eredivisie season as 7th.

In the KNVB Cup, FC Groningen lost 2–1 against FC Emmen in the 2nd round and are eliminated from the cup.

Jørgen Strand Larsen was the top scorer of the club in this season with 9 goals in Eredivisie.

Ko Itakura and Sergio Padt were the most appeared players in this season with 36 appearances; 35 appearances in Eredivisie and 1 appearance in the KNVB Cup.

== Players ==
=== First-team squad ===
As of 1 February 2021

Note: Flags indicate national team as defined under FIFA eligibility rules; some limited exceptions apply. Players may hold more than one non-FIFA nationality.

No.	Pos.	Nation	Player
1	GK	NED	Sergio Padt
2	DF	SUR	Damil Dankerlui
3	DF	NED	Bart van Hintum
4	DF	NED	Wessel Dammers
5	DF	JPN	Ko Itakura (on loan from Manchester City)
6	MF	NED	Azor Matusiwa
7	MF	SWE	Ramon Pascal Lundqvist
8	MF	GER	Sam Schreck
9	FW	NOR	Jørgen Strand Larsen
10	FW	NED	Arjen Robben (captain)
11	FW	MAR	Mohamed El Hankouri
14	FW	NED	Patrick Joosten
15	FW	SWE	Gabriel Gudmundsson

No.	Pos.	Nation	Player
17	DF	ESP	Miguel Ángel Leal (on loan from Villarreal)
18	MF	MAR	Ahmed El Messaoudi
19	FW	SWE	Paulos Abraham (on loan from AIK)
21	FW	NED	Alessio Da Cruz (on loan from Parma)
23	GK	NOR	Per Kristian Bråtveit (on loan from Djurgården)
25	GK	NED	Jan de Boer
26	MF	NED	Daniël van Kaam
31	MF	SVK	Tomáš Suslov
32	DF	NED	Mike te Wierik
33	FW	NED	Joël van Kaam
34	FW	NED	Kian Slor
37	FW	NED	Thijs Dallinga
48	DF	NED	Leonel Miguel

=== Out on loan ===
Note: Flags indicate national team as defined under FIFA eligibility rules; some limited exceptions apply. Players may hold more than one non-FIFA nationality.

No.	Pos.	Nation	Player
16	GK	NED	Jan Hoekstra (at Roda JC Kerkrade until 30 June 2021)
19	MF	DEN	Nicklas Strunck (at Esbjerg fB until 30 June 2021)
24	GK	NED	Nigel Bertrams (at PEC Zwolle until 30 June 2021)

No.	Pos.	Nation	Player
29	FW	NED	Romano Postema (at Den Bosch until 30 June 2021)
—	DF	NED	Thomas Poll (at FC Dordrecht until 30 June 2021)

== Transfers ==
=== In ===
Pos.	Player	Transferred from	Fee	Date
MF	(Netherlands) Tom van de Looi	(Netherlands) NEC Nijmegen	End of loan	30 Jun 2020
DF	(Netherlands) Amir Absalem	(Netherlands) Almere City FC	End of loan	30 Jun 2020
FW	(Netherlands) Arjen Robben			1 Jul 2020
DF	(Netherlands) Wessel Dammers	(Netherlands) Fortuna Sittard	Free	1 Jul 2020
DF	(Netherlands) Damil Dankerlui	(Netherlands) Willem II	€375,000	27 Jul 2020
DF	(Japan) Ko Itakura	(England) Manchester City F.C.	On loan	27 Jul 2020
FW	(Netherlands) Patrick Joosten	(Netherlands) FC Utrecht	€600,000	6 Aug 2020
GK	(Netherlands) Nigel Bertrams	(Netherlands) MVV Maastricht	Free	18 Aug 2020
FW	(Norway) Jørgen Strand Larsen	(Norway) Sarpsborg 08 FF	€1,100,000	9 Sep 2020
DF	(Spain) Migue Leal	(Spain) Villarreal CF B	On loan	19 Sep 2020
MF	(Cape Verde) Alessio da Cruz	(Italy) Parma Calcio 1913	On loan	3 Oct 2020
GK	(Norway) Per Kristian Bråtveit	(Sweden) Djurgårdens IF Fotboll	On loan	4 Jan 2021
DF	(Netherlands) Mike te Wierik	(England) Derby County F.C.	Undisclosed	19 Jan 2021
FW	(Sweden) Paulos Abraham	(Sweden) AIK	On loan	1 Feb 2021

=== Out ===
Pos.	Player	Transferred to	Fee	Date
FW	(Netherlands) Daishawn Redan	(Germany) Hertha BSC	End of loan	30 Jun 2020
FW	(Sweden) Joel Asoro	(England) Swansea City A.F.C.	End of loan	30 Jun 2020
DF	(Japan) Ko Itakura	(England) Manchester City F.C.	End of loan	30 Jun 2020
DF	(Netherlands) Django Warmerdam	(Netherlands) FC Utrecht	Free	1 Jul 2020
DF	(Netherlands) Deyovaisio Zeefuik	(Germany) Hertha BSC	€4,000,000	6 Aug 2020
MF	(Australia) Ajdin Hrustic	(Germany) Eintracht Frankfurt	€1,000,000	28 Sep 2020
DF	(Denmark) Nicklas Strunck	(Denmark) Esbjerg fB	On loan	5 Oct 2020
DF	(Turkey) Görkem Can	(Turkey) Denizlispor	Free	26 Jan 2021

== Pre-season and friendlies ==
Win Draw Loss

1 August 2020 Friendly	Groningen (Netherlands)	1–0	(Netherlands) Heracles Almelo	Groningen, Netherlands
20:00 CEST (UTC+2)	Slor 47'	Report		Stadium: Euroborg; Referee: Danny Makkelie

11 August 2020 Friendly	Emmen (Netherlands)	1–4	(Netherlands) Groningen	Emmen, Netherlands
18:45 CEST (UTC+2)	Bijl 45'	Report	Hrustic 42'; El Karbachi 60', 84'; Šabani 87' (o.g.)	Stadium: De Oude Meerdijk

14 August 2020 Friendly	Groningen (Netherlands)	0–2	(Netherlands) PEC Zwolle	Groningen, Netherlands
19:00 CEST (UTC+2)		Report	Ghoochannejhad 48', 92'	Stadium: Euroborg; Attendance: 1,400; Referee: Jeroen Manschot
Note: Match was played in two 60-minute halves.

21 August 2020 Friendly	FC Volendam (Netherlands)	0–2	(Netherlands) Groningen	Westwoud, Netherlands
18:00 CEST (UTC+2)		Report	Balk 21'; Absalem 58'	Stadium: VV Woudia

22 August 2020 Friendly	Almere City (Netherlands)	1–1	(Netherlands) Groningen	Almere, Netherlands
14:00 CEST (UTC+2)	Hammouti 26'	Report	Lundqvist 45'	Stadium: Mitsubishi Forklift Stadion

29 August 2020 Friendly	Werder Bremen (Germany)	4–0	(Netherlands) Groningen	Lohne, Germany
15:00 CEST (UTC+2)	Sargent 10'; Eggestein 15'; Bittencourt 24'; Chong 34'	Report		Stadium: Heinz-Dettmer-Stadion

4 September 2020 Friendly	Groningen (Netherlands)	3–3	(Netherlands) NEC Nijmegen	Rolde, Netherlands
14:30 CEST (UTC+2)				Stadium: Sportpark Boerbos

6 September 2020 Friendly	Groningen (Netherlands)	1–1	(Germany) Arminia Bielefeld	Groningen, Netherlands
14:30 CEST (UTC+2)	Robben 17'		Consbruch 22'	Stadium: Euroborg

== Competitions ==
=== Overview ===
Competition	First match	Last match	Starting round	Final position	Record							
Competition	First match	Last match	Starting round	Final position	Pld	W	D	L	GF	GA	GD	Win %
Eredivisie	13 September 2020	16 May 2021	Matchday 1	7th	34	14	8	12	40	37	+3	41.18
Eredivisie Play-offs	19 May 2021		Semi-finals	Semi-finals	1	0	0	1	0	1	−1	0.00
KNVB Cup	2 December 2020	15 December 2020	First round	Second round	1	0	0	1	1	2	−1	0.00
Total					36	14	8	14	41	40	+1	38.89

Source: Soccerway

=== Eredivisie ===
==== League table ====
Pos	Team	Pld	W	D	L	GF	GA	GD	Pts	Qualification or relegation
5	Feyenoord (O)	34	16	11	7	64	36	+28	59	Qualification for the European competition play-offs (Note: Winner of play-off will qualify to Europa Conference League second qualifying round.)
6	Utrecht	34	13	14	7	52	41	+11	53	Qualification for the European competition play-offs
7	Groningen	34	14	8	12	40	37	+3	50	Qualification for the European competition play-offs
8	Sparta Rotterdam	34	13	8	13	49	48	+1	47	Qualification for the European competition play-offs
9	Heracles Almelo	34	12	8	14	42	53	−11	44	

Source: Eredivisie, Soccerway
Rules for classification: Season in progress: 1) Most points won; 2) Less points lost; 3) Goal difference; 4) Goals scored; 5) Alphabetical order; End of season: 1) Points; 2) Goal difference; 3) Goals scored; 4) Head-to-head points; 5) Head-to-head goal difference; 6) Head-to-head away goals scored; 7) Play-off if relevant for deciding champion, relegation or participating in a European league, otherwise by draw. 8) Penalty shoot-out (only after a play-off)
(O) Play-off winners

==== Results summary ====
Overall								Home						Away					
Pld	W	D	L	GF	GA	GD	Pts	W	D	L	GF	GA	GD	W	D	L	GF	GA	GD
34	14	8	12	40	37	+3	50	7	6	4	17	13	+4	7	2	8	23	24	−1

Source: Eredivisie

==== Results by round ====
Round	1	2	3	4	5	6	7	8	9	10	11	12	13	14	15	16	17	18	19	20	21	22	23	24	25	26	27	28	29	30	31	32	33	34
Ground	H	A	A	H	H	A	H	A	H	H	A	H	A	H	A	A	H	A	H	A	H	H	A	H	A	H	A	A	H	A	H	A	H	A
Result	L	W	L	W	D	W	W	L	D	W	W	W	W	L	D	W	D	L	W	L	D	W	D	W	L	D	L	W	L	L	L	W	D	L
Position	14	9	13	8	8	8	7	7	8	8	6	5	5	6	7	6	6	6	6	6	6	6	6	6	6	6	6	6	6	7	7	7	7	7

Source: Eredivisie
A = Away; H = Home; W = Win; D = Draw; L = Loss

==== Matches ====
The league fixtures were announced on 24 July 2020.

13 September 2020 1	Groningen	1–3	PSV	Groningen
16:45 CEST (UTC+2)	Dammers (yellow card) 1'; Dankerlui (yellow card) 35'; Lundqvist (yellow card) 39'; Suslov 53'; Padt (yellow card) 79'	Report	Gakpo 34', 87'; Malen 57'; Max (yellow card) 60'; Teze (yellow card) 65'	Stadium: Hitachi Capital Mobility Stadion; Attendance: 6,049; Referee: Serdar Gözübüyük

20 September 2020 2	ADO Den Haag	0–1	Groningen	The Hague
12:15 CEST (UTC+2)	Kramer (yellow card) 49'	Report	Pinas 23' (o.g.); Dammers (yellow card) 45'	Stadium: Cars Jeans Stadion; Attendance: 3,378; Referee: Danny Makkelie

25 September 2020 3	Twente	3–1	Groningen	Enschede
20:00 CEST (UTC+2)	Černý 22'; Danilo 37'; Jeremejeff 88'	Report	Van Hintum (yellow card) 42'; El Messaoudi 52'	Stadium: De Grolsch Veste; Attendance: 8,000; Referee: Sander van der Eijk

4 October 2020 4	Groningen	1–0	Ajax	Groningen
12:15 CEST (UTC+2)	Balk 49'	Report	Gravenberch (yellow card) 60'	Stadium: Hitachi Capital Mobility Stadion; Attendance: 0 Referee: Dennis Higler

18 October 2020 5	Groningen	0–0	Utrecht	Groningen
16:45 CEST (UTC+2)	Dammers (yellow card) 11'; Strand Larsen (yellow card) 59'; El Messaoudi (yellow card) 64'; Van Hintum (yellow card) 70'; Matusiwa (yellow card) 85'	Report		Stadium: Hitachi Capital Mobility Stadion; Attendance: 0 Referee: Jeroen Manschot

25 October 2020 6	Fortuna Sittard	1–3	Groningen	Sittard
12:15 CET (UTC+1)	Tekie (yellow card) 25'; Seuntjens 54' (pen.)	Report	Larsen 6', 28'; Dammers (yellow card) 52'; Van Hintum 79'	Stadium: Fortuna Sittard Stadion; Attendance: 0 Referee: Pol van Boekel

31 October 2020 7	Groningen	2–1	VVV-Venlo	Groningen
20:00 CET (UTC+1)	Joosten 26'; Strand Larsen 48'; Gudmundsson (yellow card) 88'	Report	Giakoumakis 90+5'	Stadium: Hitachi Capital Mobility Stadion; Attendance: 0 Referee: Allard Lindhout

8 November 2020 8	Feyenoord	2–0	Groningen	Rotterdam
14:30 CET	Geertruida 50'; Berghuis 82' (pen.)	Report		Stadium: De Kuip; Attendance: 0 Referee: Danny Makkelie

21 November 2020 9	Groningen	1–1	Vitesse	Groningen
20:00 CET (UTC+1)	Joosten 29'; Van Hintum (yellow card) 54'; Dammers (yellow card) 55'	Report	Bero (yellow card) 33'; Openda 45'	Stadium: Hitachi Capital Mobility Stadion; Attendance: 0 Referee: Björn Kuipers

29 November 2020 10	Groningen	1–0	Willem II	Groningen
14:30 CET (UTC+1)	El Messaoudi 63'	Report	Sağlam (yellow card) 45+1'	Stadium: Hitachi Capital Mobility Stadion; Attendance: 0 Referee: Martin van den Kerkhof

6 December 2020 11	AZ	1–2	Groningen	Alkmaar
14:30 CET (UTC+1)	Midtsjø (yellow card) 8' (yellow-red card) 57'; Koopmeiners 21', (yellow card) 90+5'; Martins Indi (yellow card) 78' (yellow-red card) 85'; Stengs (yellow card) 90+1'; Wijndal (yellow card) 90+5'	Report	El Messaoudi 69', 74'; Joosten (yellow card) 79'; El Hankouri (red card) 90+5'	Stadium: AFAS Stadion; Attendance: 0 Referee: Serdar Gözübüyük

12 December 2020 12	Groningen	2–0	RKC Waalwijk	Groningen
16:30 CET (UTC+1)	El Messaoudi 54'; Van Kaam 76'	Report		Stadium: Hitachi Capital Mobility Stadion; Attendance: 0 Referee: Jannick van der Laan

19 December 2020 13	Sparta Rotterdam	2–3	Groningen	Rotterdam
16:30 CET (UTC+1)	Thy 36'; Pinto (yellow card) 71'; Burger 79'	Report	Dammers 16'; Larsen 53', 73'	Stadium: Het Kasteel; Attendance: 0 Referee: Danny Makkelie

23 December 2020 14	Groningen	0–1	Heracles Almelo	Groningen
20:00 CET (UTC+1)		Report	Szőke 78'	Stadium: Euroborg; Attendance: 0 Referee: Allard Lindhout

9 January 2021 15	Utrecht	2–2	Groningen	Utrecht
21:00 CET (UTC+1)	Ramselaar 39'; Kerk (yellow card) 42', (goal) 90+4'; Janssen (yellow card) 69'	Report	Joosten 16'; Larsen 21'; Suslov (yellow card) 55'	Stadium: Stadion Galgenwaard; Attendance: 0 Referee: Jeroen Manschot

14 January 2021 16	Willem II	2–3	Groningen	Tilburg
21:00 CET (UTC+1)	Nunnely 60'; Dammers 79' (o.g.)	Report	El Hankouri 50', 90+3'; Itakura 84', (yellow card) 90+2'	Stadium: Koning Willem II Stadion; Attendance: 0 Referee: Marc Nagtegaal

17 January 2021 17	Groningen	2–2	Twente	Groningen
14:30 CET (UTC+1)	El Messaoudi 47'; Schreck (yellow card) 64'; Larsen 66'	Report	Đumić 12'; Van Leeuwen 22', (yellow card) 53'; Abass (yellow card) 78'	Stadium: Euroborg; Attendance: 0 Referee: Kevin Blom

23 January 2021 18	Vitesse	1–0	Groningen	Arnhem
18:45 CET (UTC+1)	Bazoer 36'; Tannane (yellow card) 73'; Vroegh (yellow card) 79'	Report	El Messaoudi (yellow card) 45'; Da Cruz (yellow card) 58'	Stadium: GelreDome; Attendance: 0 Referee: Björn Kuipers

26 January 2021 19	Groningen	3–0	ADO Den Haag	Groningen
21:00 CET (UTC+1)	Lundqvist 18'; Larsen 43'; Da Cruz 68'	Report	Bourard (yellow card) 38'; Ćatić (yellow card) 76'	Stadium: Euroborg; Attendance: 0 Referee: Rob Dieperink

30 January 2021 20	Heracles Almelo	1–0	Groningen	Almelo
16:30 CET (UTC+1)	Burgzorg 24'	Report	Da Cruz (yellow card) 46'	Stadium: Erve Asito; Attendance: 0 Referee: Pol van Boekel

13 February 2021 22	Groningen	1–0	PEC Zwolle	Groningen
20:00 CET (UTC+1)	Larsen 16'; Te Wierik (yellow card) 48'	Report	Pherai (yellow card) 51'; Clement (red card) 59'	Stadium: Euroborg; Attendance: 0 Referee: Jeroen Manschot

21 February 2021 23	SC Heerenveen	1–1	Groningen	Heerenveen
14:30 CET (UTC+1)	De Jong 43'	Report	Suslov 82'	Stadium: Abe Lenstra Stadion; Attendance: 0 Referee: Kevin Blom

24 February 2021 21	Groningen	0–0	Feyenoord	Groningen
18:45 CET (UTC+1)		Report		Stadium: Euroborg; Attendance: 0 Referee: Martin van den Kerkhof

28 February 2021 24	Groningen	1–0	Fortuna Sittard	Groningen
14:30 CET (UTC+1)	El Hankouri (yellow card) 29'; Schreck (yellow card) 34'; Abraham 50'; Dammers (yellow card) 90+2'	Report		Stadium: Euroborg; Attendance: 0 Referee: Jannick van der Laan

7 March 2021 25	Ajax	3–1	Groningen	Amsterdam
12:15 CET (UTC+1)	Gravenberch 6'; Kudus (yellow card) 48'; Haller 54'; Tadić 77' (pen.); Klaassen 83'	Report	Te Wierik (yellow card) 73'; El Messaoudi 84'	Stadium: Johan Cruyff Arena; Attendance: 0 Referee: Dennis Higler

13 March 2021 26	Groningen	1–1	Emmen	Groningen
20:00 CET (UTC+1)	Padt (yellow card) 7'; Da Cruz 60'	Report	Peña (yellow card) 33'; Bijl 38'	Stadium: Euroborg; Attendance: 0 Referee: Allard Lindhout

20 March 2021 27	RKC Waalwijk	3–1	Groningen	Waalwijk
21:00 CET (UTC+1)	Oosting 5', 15'; Touba (yellow card) 66'; Sow 86'	Report	El Messaoudi 33'; Da Cruz (yellow card) 72'; Itakura (yellow card) 90'	Stadium: Mandemakers Stadion; Attendance: 0 Referee: Edwin van de Graaf

3 April 2021 28	VVV-Venlo	0–1	Groningen	Venlo
18:45 CEST (UTC+2)		Report	Matusiwa (yellow card) 7' (yellow-red card) 20'; El Hankouri 87'; Da Cruz (yellow card) 89'	Stadium: De Koel; Attendance: 0 Referee: Bas Nijhuis

11 April 2021 29	Groningen	0–2	SC Heerenveen	Groningen
14:30 CEST (UTC+2)	Te Wierik (yellow card) 42'	Report	H. Veerman 71' (pen.); Halilović 86'	Stadium: Euroborg; Attendance: 0 Referee: Dennis Higler

24 April 2021 30	PSV	1–0	Groningen	Eindhoven
20:00 CEST (UTC+2)	Zahavi 64' (pen.); Dumfries (yellow card) 72'	Report	Te Wierik (yellow card) 59'; Dammers (yellow card) 62'; Da Cruz (yellow card) 76'	Stadium: Philips Stadion; Attendance: 0 Referee: Jeroen Manschot

2 May 2021 31	Groningen	1–2	Sparta Rotterdam	Groningen
14:30 CEST (UTC+2)	El Hankouri (yellow card) 58'; Lundqvist 87'	Report	Harroui 27'; Meijers (yellow card) 37'; Beugelsdijk 56'	Stadium: Euroborg; Attendance: 0 Referee: Danny Makkelie

9 May 2021 32	Emmen	0–4	Groningen	Emmen
12:15 CEST (UTC+2)	Bijl (yellow card) 27'; Vlak (yellow card) 53'	Report	Van Hintum 28', (yellow card) 55'; Da Cruz 52', 62'; Lundqvist (yellow card) 55'; Abraham 81'	Stadium: De Oude Meerdijk; Attendance: 0 Referee: Serdar Gözübüyük

13 May 2021 33	Groningen	0–0	AZ	Groningen
14:30 CEST (UTC+2)	Itakura (yellow card) 68'; Te Wierik (yellow card) 72'; Van Hintum (yellow card) 80'	Report	Svensson (yellow card) 70'	Stadium: Euroborg; Attendance: 0 Referee: Allard Lindhout

16 May 2021 34	PEC Zwolle	1–0	Groningen	Zwolle
14:30 CEST (UTC+2)	Itakura 80' (o.g.)	Report		Stadium: MAC³PARK Stadion; Attendance: 0 Referee: Richard Martens

==== European competition play-offs ====
19 May 2021 Semi-finals	Utrecht	1–0	Groningen	Utrecht
18:45 CEST (UTC+2)	Boussaid (yellow card) 20'; Gustafson 77'; Van de Streek (yellow card) 84'	Report	Itakura (yellow card) 17'; Dankerlui (yellow card) 23'; Lundqvist (yellow card) 62'; El Hankouri (yellow card) 75'	Stadium: Stadion Galgenwaard; Attendance: 3,000; Referee: Danny Makkelie

=== KNVB Cup ===
2 December 2020 First round	SV TEC	Bye	Groningen	Tiel
19:45 CET (UTC+1)				Stadium: Sportpark De Lok

15 December 2020 Second round	Emmen	2–1	Groningen	Emmen
21:00 CET (UTC+1)	Bijl 60'; Jansen 67'	Report	Lundqvist 27'	Stadium: De Oude Meerdijk; Attendance: 0 Referee: Kevin Blom

== Statistics ==
=== Scorers ===
#	Player	Eredivisie	KNVB	Total
1	(Norway) Jørgen Strand Larsen	9	0	9
2	(Morocco) Ahmed El Messaoudi	8	0	8
3	(Cape Verde) Alessio da Cruz	4	0	4
4	(Netherlands) Mohamed El Hankouri	3	0	3
4	(Netherlands) Patrick Joosten	3	0	3
4	(Sweden) Paulos Abraham	3	0	3
4	(Sweden) Ramon Pascal Lundqvist	2	1	3
8	(Netherlands) Bart van Hintum	2	0	2
8	(Slovakia) Tomáš Suslov	2	0	2
10	(Netherlands) Daniël van Kaam	1	0	1
10	(Japan) Ko Itakura	1	0	1
10	(Netherlands) Remco Balk	1	0	1
10	(Netherlands) Wessel Dammers	1	0	1

=== Appearances ===
#	Player	Eredivisie	KNVB	Total
1	(Japan) Ko Itakura	35	1	36
1	(Netherlands) Sergio Padt	35	1	36
3	(Netherlands) Daniël van Kaam	33	1	34
3	(Netherlands) Mohamed El Hankouri	34	0	34
5	(Netherlands) Bart van Hintum	32	1	33
6	(Norway) Jørgen Strand Larsen	31	1	32
7	(Morocco) Ahmed El Messaoudi	29	1	30
7	(Suriname) Damil Dankerlui	29	1	30
7	(Slovakia) Tomáš Suslov	29	1	30
10	(Netherlands) Wessel Dammers	27	1	28
11	(Netherlands) Patrick Joosten	26	1	27
11	(Sweden) Ramon Pascal Lundqvist	26	1	27
13	(Netherlands) Azor Matusiwa	23	1	24
14	(Cape Verde) Alessio da Cruz	23	0	23
14	(Sweden) Gabriel Gudmundsson	23	0	23
16	(Netherlands) Mike te Wierik	16	0	16
17	(Sweden) Paulos Abraham	14	0	14
17	(Germany) Sam Schreck	13	1	14
19	(Netherlands) Remco Balk	11	1	12
20	(Spain) Migue Leal	10	0	10
21	(Netherlands) Arjen Robben	7	0	7
21	(Netherlands) Thijs Dallinga	6	1	7
23	(Netherlands) Joël van Kaam	6	0	6
23	(Netherlands) Kian Slor	5	1	6
25	(Netherlands) Thomas Poll	4	0	4
26	(Netherlands) Romano Postema	3	0	3
27	(Australia) Ajdin Hrustic	1	0	1
27	(Netherlands) Bjorn Meijer	1	0	1
27	(Netherlands) Leonel Miguel	1	0	1

=== Clean sheets ===
#	Player	Eredivisie	Total
1	(Netherlands) Sergio Padt	13	13
Total		13	13

=== Disciplinary record ===
#	Player	Eredivisie		KNVB		Total	
#	Player	Yellow card	Red card	Yellow card	Red card	Yellow card	Red card
1	(Netherlands) Mohamed El Hankouri	3	1	0	0	3	1
2	(Netherlands) Azor Matusiwa	2	1	0	0	2	1
2	(Suriname) Damil Dankerlui	2	1	0	0	2	1
4	(Netherlands) Wessel Dammers	8	0	1	0	9	0
5	(Cape Verde) Alessio da Cruz	5	0	0	0	5	0
5	(Netherlands) Bart van Hintum	5	0	0	0	5	0
5	(Netherlands) Mike te Wierik	5	0	0	0	5	0
8	(Japan) Ko Itakura	4	0	0	0	4	0
9	(Sweden) Ramon Pascal Lundqvist	3	0	0	0	3	0
10	(Morocco) Ahmed El Messaoudi	2	0	0	0	2	0
10	(Netherlands) Remco Balk	2	0	0	0	2	0
10	(Germany) Sam Schreck	2	0	0	0	2	0
10	(Netherlands) Sergio Padt	2	0	0	0	2	0
14	(Sweden) Gabriel Gudmundsson	1	0	0	0	1	0
14	(Netherlands) Joël van Kaam	1	0	0	0	1	0
14	(Norway) Jørgen Strand Larsen	1	0	0	0	1	0
14	(Netherlands) Patrick Joosten	1	0	0	0	1	0
14	(Slovakia) Tomáš Suslov	1	0	0	0	1	0
