= Daniël van Kaam =

Dutch footballer (born 2000)

Personal information
- Date of birth: 23 June 2000 (age 26)
- Place of birth: Delfzijl, Netherlands
- Height: 1.75 m (5 ft 9 in)
- Position: Midfielder

Team information
- Current team: Heracles Almelo
- Number: 26

Youth career
- 2005–2012: VV Appingedam
- 2012–2018: Groningen

Senior career*
Years	Team	Apps	(Gls)
2018–2022	Groningen	64	(2)
2022–2024	Cambuur	63	(3)
2024–	Heracles Almelo	27	(0)
2025–2026	→ RKC Waalwijk (loan)	30	(1)

International career
2016–2017	Netherland U17	7	(0)
2017	Netherland U18	1	(0)
2018	Netherland U19	2	(0)
2021–2023	Netherland U21	8	(1)
- * Club domestic league appearances and goals as of 2 October 2026

Daniël van Kaam (born 23 June 2000) is a Dutch professional footballer who plays as a midfielder for Eerste Divisie club Heracles Almelo.

== Club career ==
=== Groningen ===
Van Kaam is a product of FC Groningen's youth academy, and signed his first professional contract on 26 June 2017. He made his senior debut for Groningen's reserves in the Derde Divisie on 25 August 2018 against Achilles '29. On 6 October 2018, he made his professional debut with Groningen's first team in a 1–0 Eredivisie loss to ADO Den Haag.

On 12 December 2020, Van Kaam scored his first professional goal, contributing to a 2–0 league victory against RKC Waalwijk.

=== Cambuur ===
On 31 August 2022, van Kaam signed a three-year contract with Cambuur. He made his competitive debut for the club on 3 September, starting in a 4–0 defeat to Ajax in the Eredivisie. On 26 January 2023, he scored his first goal for Cambuur to secure a 1–0 away win over his former club Groningen. At the end of the season, in which Van Kaam scored once in 29 appearances, his club suffered relegation to the Eerste Divisie.

On 4 August 2023, Van Kaam was appointed team captain of Cambuur ahead of the 2023–24 season.

=== Heracles Almelo ===
On 2 August 2024, van Kaam signed a three-year contract with Heracles Almelo.

== International career ==
Van Kaam is a youth international for the Netherlands.

== Personal life ==
Van Kaam was born in the Netherlands to a Dutch father and Brazilian mother. Van Kaam is the older brother of Joël van Kaam. When his younger brother made his professional debut for Groningen, they joined a lineage of brothers who have played for the club's first team, which includes Erwin and Ronald Koeman, and Dominique and Gregoor van Dijk.

== Career statistics ==
As of match played 3 May 2024

Appearances and goals by club, season and competition
Club	Season	League			National cup		Other		Total	
Club	Season	Division	Apps	Goals	Apps	Goals	Apps	Goals	Apps	Goals
Jong Groningen	2018–19	Derde Divisie	27	6	—		—		27	6
Groningen	2018–19	Eredivisie	1	0	0	0	—		1	0
Groningen	2019–20	Eredivisie	11	0	2	0	—		13	0
Groningen	2020–21	Eredivisie	32	1	1	0	1 (Note: Appearance in Eredivisie European play-offs)	0	34	1
Groningen	2021–22	Eredivisie	20	1	2	0	—		22	1
Groningen	Total		64	2	5	0	1	0	70	2
Cambuur	2022–23	Eredivisie	27	1	2	0	—		29	1
Cambuur	2023–24	Eerste Divisie	35	2	5	1	—		40	3
Cambuur	Total		62	3	7	1	—		69	4
Career total			153	11	12	1	1	0	166	12
