= Joël van Kaam =

Dutch footballer (born 2002)

Personal information
- Date of birth: 8 March 2002 (age 24)
- Place of birth: Delfzijl, Netherlands
- Height: 1.79 m (5 ft 10 in)
- Position: Right-back

Team information
- Current team: Quick Boys
- Number: 2

Youth career
- –2013: VV Appingedam
- 2013–2020: Groningen

Senior career*
Years	Team	Apps	(Gls)
2020–2024	Groningen U21	35	(0)
2020–2022	Groningen	6	(0)
2021–2022	→ Emmen (loan)	16	(0)
2024–2025	ACV	27	(2)
2025–	Quick Boys	36	(0)

International career
2017	Netherlands U15	1	(0)
2017–2018	Netherlands U18	6	(1)
2018	Netherlands U18	1	(0)
- * Club domestic league appearances and goals as of 10:32, 24 October 2026 (UTC)

Joël van Kaam (born 8 March 2002) is a Dutch professional footballer who plays as a right-back for Tweede Divisie club Quick Boys.

== Career ==
Van Kaam started playing football in the youth ranks VV Appingedam before transitioning to the youth academy of FC Groningen in 2013. On 12 July 2019, he signed his first professional contract with the club, committing to a two-year deal with an option for an additional year. Regularly featuring in the first team selection, he made his professional debut in the Eredivisie on 8 November 2020, replacing Remco Balk in the 66th minute of a 2–0 away loss against Feyenoord. Just a week later, he earned his first start in the home game against Vitesse.

On 31 August 2021, Van Kaam joined Emmen on loan for the 2021–22 season alongside fellow Groningen-player Kian Slor.

On 5 March 2024, Van Kaam was announced as a new signing for ACV Assen ahead of the 2024–25 season.

After one season in Assen, he agreed to join Tweede Divisie side Quick Boys on 17 February 2025, ahead of the 2025–26 campaign.

== Personal life ==
Van Kaam was born in the Netherlands to a Dutch father and Brazilian mother. Van Kaam is the younger brother of Daniël van Kaam. When Joël made his professional debut for Groningen, they joined a lineage of brothers who have played for the club's first team, which includes Erwin and Ronald Koeman, and Dominique and Gregoor van Dijk.

== Career statistics ==
=== Club ===
As of match played 15 April 2022

Appearances and goals by club, season and competition
Club	Season	League			KNVB Cup		Other		Total	
Club	Season	Division	Apps	Goals	Apps	Goals	Apps	Goals	Apps	Goals
Groningen	2020–21	Eredivisie	6	0	0	0	—		6	0
Groningen	2021–22	Eredivisie	0	0	0	0	—		0	0
Groningen	2022–23	Eredivisie	0	0	0	0	—		0	0
Groningen	2023–24	Eerste Divisie	0	0	0	0	—		0	0
Emmen (loan)	2021–22	Eerste Divisie	16	0	2	0	—		18	0
Career total			22	0	2	0	—		24	0
