= Migue Leal =

Spanish footballer

Personal information
- Full name: Miguel Ángel Leal Díaz
- Date of birth: 1 February 1997 (age 29)
- Place of birth: Villarreal, Spain
- Height: 1.76 m (5 ft 9 in)
- Position: Right-back

Team information
- Current team: Racing Ferrol
- Number: 2

Youth career
- 2002–2016: Villarreal

Senior career*
Years	Team	Apps	(Gls)
2015–2018	Villarreal C	62	(4)
2017–2023	Villarreal B	96	(4)
2018–2019	→ Murcia (loan)	3	(0)
2019–2023	Villarreal	0	(0)
2020–2021	→ Groningen (loan)	10	(0)
2023–2024	Andorra	15	(0)
2025	Gimnàstic	19	(1)
2025–	Racing Ferrol	31	(0)
- * Club domestic league appearances and goals as of 9 June 2026

Miguel Ángel "Migue" Leal Díaz (born 1 February 1997) is a Spanish professional footballer who plays as a right-back for Racing de Ferrol.

== Club career ==
Born in Villarreal, Valencian Community, Leal joined Villarreal CF's youth setup at the age of five. He made his senior debut with the C-team on 9 May 2015, aged 18, by playing the last 16 minutes of a 1–4 Tercera División home loss against Atlético Levante UD.

On 14 August 2018, after establishing himself as a regular starter for the C's, Leal moved to Segunda División B side Real Murcia on a one-year loan. He moved back to his parent club the following 24 January, after appearing rarely, and was assigned to the reserves also in the third division.

Leal made his first team debut on 18 December 2019, starting in a 5–0 away routing of Comillas CF for the season's Copa del Rey. On 19 September of the following year, he moved to FC Groningen on loan for one year.

Leal made his Eredivisie debut on 25 September 2020, coming on as a second-half substitute for Bart van Hintum in a 1–3 loss at FC Twente. Back to the Yellow Submarine in July 2021, he was again assigned to the B-team, being a regular starter during the 2021–22 Primera División RFEF as the side achieved promotion to Segunda División.

Leal scored his first professional goal on 3 September 2022, netting the B's second in a 3–0 home win over CD Mirandés. The following 14 June, he permanently left Villarreal after two decades with the club, and moved to FC Andorra also in the second division a day later.

On 5 January 2025, after six months without a club, Leal signed a six-month deal with Primera Federación side Gimnàstic de Tarragona. On 27 June, he moved to fellow league team Racing de Ferrol.

== Career statistics ==
=== Club ===
As of match played 19 December 2023

Appearances and goals by club, season and competition
Club	Season	League			National Cup		Other		Total	
Club	Season	Division	Apps	Goals	Apps	Goals	Apps	Goals	Apps	Goals
Murcia (loan)	2018–19	Segunda División B	3	0	0	0	—		3	0
Villarreal	2019–20	La Liga	0	0	1	0	—		1	0
Groningen (loan)	2020–21	Eredivisie	10	0	0	0	—		10	0
Villarreal B	2018–19	Segunda División B	5	0	—		—		5	0
Villarreal B	2019–20	Segunda División B	25	0	—		—		25	0
Villarreal B	2021–22	Primera División RFEF	36	3	—		2 (Note: Appearances in 2022 Primera División RFEF play-offs)	0	38	3
Villarreal B	2022–23	Segunda División	30	1	—		—		30	1
Villarreal B	Total		96	4	0	0	2	0	98	4
Andorra	2023–24	Segunda División	12	0	1	0	0	0	13	0
Career total			121	0	2	0	2	0	125	4
