= Ramon Pascal Lundqvist =

Swedish footballer

Personal information
- Full name: Ramon Pascal Lundqvist
- Date of birth: 10 May 1997 (age 29)
- Place of birth: Algutsrum, Sweden
- Height: 1.83 m (6 ft 0 in)
- Position: Attacking midfielder

Team information
- Current team: IFK Göteborg
- Number: 10

Youth career
- –2009: Trekantens IF
- 2009–2013: Kalmar FF
- 2013–2015: PSV

Senior career*
Years	Team	Apps	(Gls)
2015–2019	Jong PSV	50	(8)
2016–2019	PSV	2	(0)
2019	NAC Breda	17	(0)
2019–2023	Groningen	59	(7)
2021–2022	→ Panathinaikos (loan)	11	(1)
2023	Sarpsborg	30	(6)
2024	Göztepe	16	(4)
2024–	IFK Göteborg	28	(3)

International career
2012–2014	Sweden U17	14	(1)
2015	Sweden U19	6	(1)
- * Club domestic league appearances and goals as of 14:39, 19 July 2026 (UTC)

Ramon Pascal Lundqvist (born 10 May 1997) is a Swedish professional footballer who plays as an attacking midfielder for Allsvenskan club IFK Göteborg.

== Career ==
On 18 September 2015, Lundqvist made his senior debut for Jong PSV, playing the entire match in a 3–0 defeat to Sparta Rotterdam in the Eerste Divisie. A year later, he made his debut for PSV, playing the final ten minutes in a 4–0 win over NEC.

On 26 August 2021, Lundqvist joined Panathinaikos on a season-long loan, with a purchase option of €850,000.

On 7 March 2023, he permanently joined Norwegian side Sarpsborg 08 on a one-year contract for an undisclosed fee.

== Personal life ==
Born in Sweden, Lundqvist is of Nicaraguan descent. He is a youth international for Sweden, having played up to the Sweden U19s.

== Career statistics ==
As of match played 13 March 2026

Appearances and goals by club, season and competition
Club	Season	League			National cup (Note: Includes KNVB Cup, Greek Cup, Turkish Cup, Norwegian Cup, Svenska Cupen)		Europe		Total	
Club	Season	Division	Apps	Goals	Apps	Goals	Apps	Goals	Apps	Goals
PSV	2016–17	Eredivisie	2	0	1	0	1 (Note: Appearance in UEFA Champions League)	0	4	0
PSV	2017–18	Eredivisie	0	0	0	0	—		0	0
PSV	2018–19	Eredivisie	0	0	2	1	—		2	1
PSV	Total		2	0	3	1	1	0	6	1
NAC Breda	2018–19	Eredivisie	17	0	—		—		17	0
Groningen	2019–20	Eredivisie	20	5	1	0	—		21	5
Groningen	2020–21	Eredivisie	26	2	1	1	—		27	3
Groningen	2021–22	Eredivisie	1	0	0	0	—		1	0
Groningen	2022–23	Eredivisie	13	0	1	0	—		14	0
Groningen	Total		60	7	3	1	—		63	8
Panathinaikos (loan)	2021–22	Super League Greece	11	1	2	0	—		13	1
Sarpsborg	2023	Eliteserien	30	6	4	1	—		34	7
Göztepe	2023–24	TFF 1. Lig	16	4	1	0	—		17	1
Göteborg	2024	Allsvenskan	13	3	—		—		13	3
Göteborg	2025	Allsvenskan	10	0	5	1	—		15	1
Göteborg	Total		23	3	5	1	—		28	4
Career total			159	21	18	4	1	0	178	25

== Honours ==
Panathinaikos

- Greek Cup: 2021–22
