= Kō Itakura =

Japanese footballer (born 1997)

Ko Itakura 板倉 滉
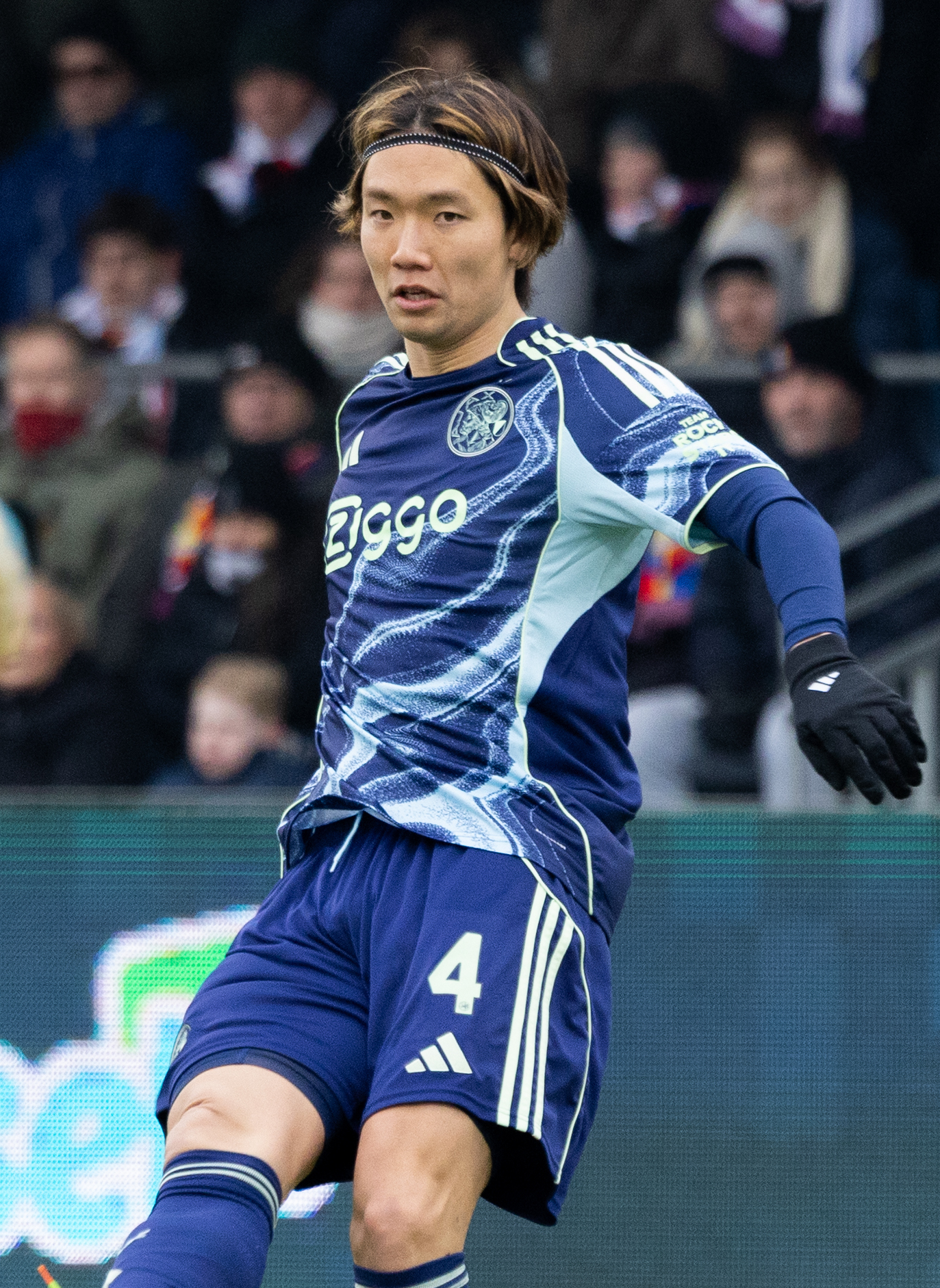
- Itakura with Ajax in 2026

Personal information
- Full name: Kō Itakura
- Date of birth: 27 January 1997 (age 29)
- Place of birth: Aoba-ku, Yokohama, Kanagawa, Japan
- Height: 1.88 m (6 ft 2 in)
- Positions: Centre-back; defensive midfielder

Team information
- Current team: Borussia Mönchengladbach
- Number: 6

Youth career
- 2006–2014: Kawasaki Frontale

Senior career*
Years	Team	Apps	(Gls)
2015–2018	Kawasaki Frontale	7	(0)
2015	→ J. League U-22 (loan)	2	(0)
2018	→ Vegalta Sendai (loan)	24	(3)
2019–2022	Manchester City	0	(0)
2019–2021	→ Groningen (loan)	56	(1)
2021–2022	→ Schalke 04 (loan)	31	(4)
2022–2025	Borussia Mönchengladbach	75	(6)
2025–2026	Ajax	18	(1)
2026–	Borussia Mönchengladbach	5	(0)

International career^{‡}
2013	Japan U16	2	(0)
2015–2017	Japan U20	8	(1)
2018–2021	Japan U23	24	(6)
2019–	Japan	45	(2)
Medal record
Representing Japan
Asian Games
Silver medal – second place	2018 Jakarta-Palembang	Team
AFC U-19 Championship
Gold medal – first place	2016 Bahrain
- * Club domestic league appearances and goals as of 31 October 2026 ‡ National team caps and goals as of 14 November 2026

Ko Itakura (板倉 滉, Itakura Kō; born 27 January 1997) (Note: His given name is sometimes spelled Kou, based on the kana spelling, or Kō, based on Hepburn romanization.) is a Japanese professional footballer who plays as a centre-back or defensive midfielder for Bundesliga club Borussia Mönchengladbach and captains the Japan national team.

Known for his ball-playing ability, versatility, and defensive anticipation, Itakura began his career in the J1 League with Kawasaki Frontale before moving to Europe in 2019. After successful loan spells at Groningen and Schalke 04, he joined Borussia Mönchengladbach in 2022 and established himself in the Bundesliga with the club. In 2025, he became the first Japanese player in history to sign for Ajax, and returned to Mönchengladbach a year later.

== Club career ==
=== Early career ===
Born in Yokohama, Itakura joined the youth academy of Kawasaki Frontale in 2006 at the primary school level. He progressed through the youth ranks, eventually making his senior debut on 6 August 2016 in a J1 League match against Ventforet Kofu, replacing Yu Kobayashi. He was part of the squad that won the club's first-ever J1 League title in 2017, although his playing time was limited. To gain experience, he was loaned to Vegalta Sendai for the 2018 season, where he became a regular starter, scoring three goals in 24 league appearances and earning the "Tag Heuer Young Guns Award".

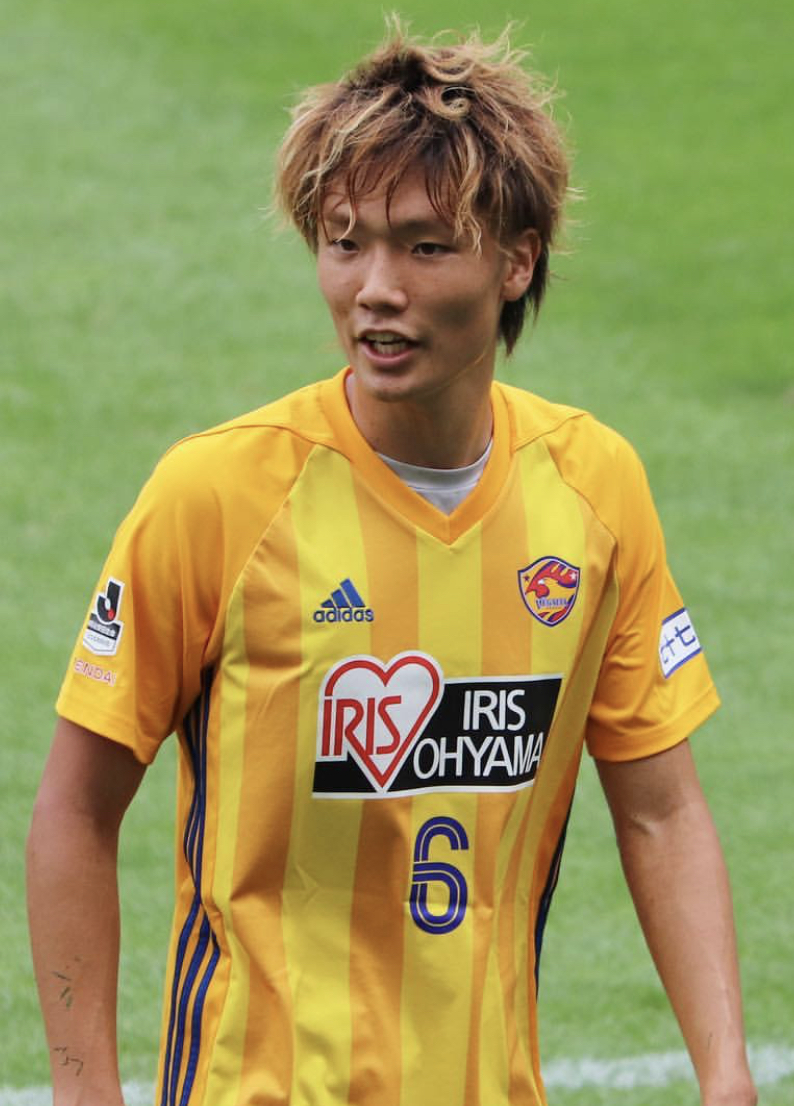
Itakura with Vegalta Sendai in 2018

=== Manchester City ===
In January 2019, Itakura signed for Premier League club Manchester City. He did not make a competitive appearance for the club, spending his entire contract duration on loan at other European clubs to secure a work permit and first-team football.

==== Loan to Groningen ====
Immediately following his move to Manchester City, Itakura was loaned to Eredivisie side Groningen. He made his debut in the Dutch top flight during the 2019–20 season, quickly adapting to the technical demands of Dutch football. His loan was extended for the 2020–21 season, where he played every minute of the league campaign until suffering a minor injury late in the season. His performances, characterized by composure on the ball and defensive solidity, earned him the FC Groningen Player of the Year award for the 2020–21 season.

==== Loan to Schalke 04 ====
On 19 August 2021, Itakura joined 2. Bundesliga club Schalke 04 on a season-long loan with an option to buy for approximately €5 million. He became a key figure in Schalke's defense, making 31 league appearances and scoring four goals. He played a crucial role in the club's immediate return to the Bundesliga as champions. Despite his desire to stay and his popularity among the fans, Schalke announced in May 2022 that they could not exercise the purchase option due to financial reasons.

=== Borussia Mönchengladbach ===
In July 2022, Itakura signed a four-year contract with Borussia Mönchengladbach. He made an immediate impact but suffered a rupture of the medial collateral ligament in his knee in September 2022, which sidelined him until just before the 2022 FIFA World Cup. He returned to club action in January 2023.

On 19 August 2023, he scored his first Bundesliga goal in a 4–4 draw against FC Augsburg. Two weeks later, on 2 September, he scored a header against defending champions Bayern Munich, securing a 1–0 lead in a match that eventually ended 1–2. His performances earned him the club's Player of the Month award for August 2023. Despite persistent ankle issues requiring surgery in October 2023, he remained a prominent starter when fit.

=== Ajax ===
On 7 August 2025, Dutch side Ajax announced the signing of Itakura on a four-year contract, making him the first Japanese footballer to play for the club's first team. The move marked his return to the Eredivisie after four years in Germany.

Itakura was integrated into the starting lineup for the 2025–26 season, utilized primarily as a ball-playing centre-back in Ajax's system, which prioritizes building from the back—a style suited to his technical profile developed at Kawasaki Frontale. He made his UEFA Champions League debut for Ajax on 17 September 2025. By January 2026, he had established himself as a regular starter, contributing one goal in 14 league appearances. Overall, he made 26 first-team appearances during the 2025-26 season before returning to Mönchengladbach in August 2026.

=== Return to Borussia Mönchengladbach ===
Itakura signed a four-year contract with Mönchengladbach until 2030, for a transfer fee of €3.5 million.

== International career ==
Itakura was selected for the senior Japan national team for 2019 Copa América and made his debut on 20 June 2019 in the game against Uruguay, as a starter.

On 29 March 2021, he scored two goals against the Argentina national under-24 football team, and was also selected to represent Japan at the Tokyo Olympics, finishing in 4th place.

In November 2022, he was selected for the 2022 FIFA World Cup Japan squad for the first time. Participated in all group stage matches and became the first Asian team to win first place in an overseas World Cup group league, contributing to advance to the final tournament for two consecutive tournaments. His long ball was the starting point of the come-from-behind goal against Germany. He was also named in the first group stage best eleven by Spanish media outlet Marca and Italian media outlet Sky Sport. The former named him one of the players to double his value in the World Cup and described him as "the most consistent performance of the entire tournament".

On 28 March 2023, he served as captain for the first time in the second match of the second term of Hajime Moriyasu's Japan against Colombia.

On 15 May 2026, Itakura was selected in the 26-man squad and named as captain of the team for the 2026 FIFA World Cup.

== Style of play ==
Itakura is a mobile, ball-playing centre-back who can also operate as a defensive midfielder. He is noted for his ability to cover ground, his recovery speed and his tactical flexibility. Although naturally right-footed, he has regularly played as a left-sided centre-back. In possession, he is composed and capable of breaking defensive lines with accurate forward and diagonal passes. He can also carry the ball forward from deeper positions, making him an option for teams seeking to progress possession through their defensive line.

== Personal life ==
On 3 August 2026, actress Haruna Kawaguchi announced her marriage to Itakura via an open letter on an Instagram post, and that they are expecting their first child together.

== Career statistics ==
=== Club ===
As of match played 31 October 2026

Appearances and goals by club, season and competition
Club	Season	League			National cup (Note: Includes Emperor's Cup, KNVB Cup, DFB-Pokal)		League cup (Note: Includes J.League Cup)		Continental		Other		Total	
Club	Season	Division	Apps	Goals	Apps	Goals	Apps	Goals	Apps	Goals	Apps	Goals	Apps	Goals
Kawasaki Frontale	2015	J1 League	0	0	0	0	0	0	–		–		0	0
Kawasaki Frontale	2016	J1 League	2	0	3	0	1	0	–		1 (Note: Appearance in J1 League Championship)	0	7	0
Kawasaki Frontale	2017	J1 League	5	0	3	0	4	0	3 (Note: Appearances in AFC Champions League)	1	–		15	1
Kawasaki Frontale	Total		7	0	6	0	5	0	3	1	1	0	22	1
Vegalta Sendai (loan)	2018	J1 League	24	3	4	0	4	0	–		–		32	3
Groningen (loan)	2018–19	Eredivisie	0	0	0	0	–		–		–		0	0
Groningen (loan)	2019–20	Eredivisie	22	0	1	0	–		–		–		23	0
Groningen (loan)	2020–21	Eredivisie	34	1	1	0	–		–		1 (Note: Appearance in Eredivisie European play-offs)	0	36	1
Groningen (loan)	Total		56	1	2	0	–		–		1	0	59	1
Schalke 04 (loan)	2021–22	2. Bundesliga	31	4	1	0	–		–		–		32	4
Borussia Mönchengladbach	2022–23	Bundesliga	24	0	1	0	–		–		–		25	0
Borussia Mönchengladbach	2023–24	Bundesliga	20	3	2	0	–		–		–		22	3
Borussia Mönchengladbach	2024–25	Bundesliga	32	4	2	1	–		–		–		34	5
Borussia Mönchengladbach	Total		76	7	5	1	–		–		–		81	8
Ajax	2025–26	Eredivisie	18	1	1	0	–		6 (Note: Appearances in UEFA Champions League)	0	1	0	26	1
Borussia Mönchengladbach	2026–27	Bundesliga	5	0	2	0	–		–		–		7	0
Career total			218	17	21	1	10	0	8	1	3	0	260	19

=== International ===
As of match played 14 November 2026

Appearances and goals by national team and year
National team	Year	Apps	Goals
Japan	2019	3	0
Japan	2020	1	0
Japan	2021	1	1
Japan	2022	11	0
Japan	2023	6	0
Japan	2024	13	1
Japan	2025	4	0
Japan	2026	6	0
Total		45	2

Scores and results list Japan's goal tally first.

List of international goals scored by Kō Itakura
No.	Date	Venue	Opponent	Score	Result	Competition
1	28 May 2021	Fukuda Denshi Arena, Chiba, Japan	Myanmar	10–0	10–0	2022 FIFA World Cup qualification
2	19 November 2024	Xiamen Egret Stadium, Xiamen, China	China	2–0	3–1	2026 FIFA World Cup qualification

== Honours ==
Kawasaki Frontale

- J1 League: 2017

Vegalta Sendai

- Emperor's Cup: runner-up 2018

Schalke 04

- 2. Bundesliga: 2021–22

Individual

- Tag Heuer Young Guns Award: 2018
- Groningen Player of the Year: 2020–21
- Borussia's Player of the Month: August 2023
- Japan Pro-Footballers Association Best XI: 2022, 2023, 2024
- IFFHS Asian Men's Team of the Year: 2024
