= Jan van Dijk (footballer) =

Dutch footballer and manager

Personal information
- Full name: Johannes Hermannus van Dijk
- Date of birth: 10 December 1956 (age 69)
- Place of birth: Schalkhaar, Netherlands
- Position: Midfielder

Senior career*
Years	Team	Apps	(Gls)
1975–1992	Groningen	470	(44)
1978–1979	→ Go Ahead Eagles (loan)	9	(1)

Managerial career
- 1996–1997: Groningen
- 1997–2001: Groningen
- 2001: Roda JC
- 2002–2003: Helmond Sport
- 2004–2004: RBC
- 2005–2007: Emmen
- 2007–2008: Al-Nassr (assistant)
- 2008–2010: VVV
- 2012–2013: Gemert
- 2014–2016: Helmond Sport
- 2017–2021: Chevremont
- * Club domestic league appearances and goals

Johannes ("Jan") Hermannus van Dijk (born 10 December 1956 in Schalkhaar, Deventer, Overijssel) is a retired Dutch footballer and manager.

== Playing career ==
=== Club ===
Van Dijk is best known for having spent his entire career at FC Groningen, apart from a short loan spell to Go Ahead Eagles. His stay with the club spanned from 1975 to 1992, and earned him the nickname "Mister FC Groningen" as well as the record for number of appearances in a Groningen jersey (537).

== Coaching career ==
After he retired in 1992, Van Dijk became a football manager. He coached FC Groningen, Roda JC, RBC Roosendaal, Helmond Sport, and FC Emmen. He was fired by FC Emmen on 15 February 2007. After a season serving as Foeke Booy assistant at Al-Nassr, he was appointed manager of then-Eerste Divisie club VVV-Venlo in June 2008. Under his tenure, VVV-Venlo were crowned 2008–09 Eerste Divisie champions and achieved immediate promotion back to the Eredivisie. He was subsequently dismissed in December 2010 due to poor results.

In March 2012, it was announced Van Dijk would become manager of Topklasse amateurs VV Gemert on a two-year deal valid from the 2012–13 season. After suffering relegation in his first season as manager, Van Dijk and Gemert agreed to mutually part company in May 2013.

In March 2014, Van Dijk agreed to return to Helmond Sport, signing a deal effective from 1 July 2014. He left the club in February 2016.

He was named manager at amateur side Chevremont for the 2017/18 season.

== Personal life ==
Two of his sons, Gregoor and Dominique, also played professional football in the Netherlands. He is married to Ineke and he has two more sons and two daughters.
