= Alessio da Cruz =

Cape Verdean footballer (born 1997)

Personal information
- Full name: Alessio Sergio Fernando da Cruz
- Date of birth: 18 January 1997 (age 29)
- Place of birth: Almere, Netherlands
- Height: 1.85 m (6 ft 1 in)
- Positions: Forward; winger

Team information
- Current team: Anorthosis
- Number: 9

Youth career
- 2007–2010: Ajax
- 2010–2011: Almere City
- 2011–2014: Twente

Senior career*
Years	Team	Apps	(Gls)
2014–2017	Twente	3	(0)
2014–2015	Jong Twente	6	(1)
2016–2017	→ Dordrecht (loan)	29	(5)
2017–2018	Novara	19	(5)
2018–2022	Parma	9	(0)
2019	→ Spezia (loan)	14	(2)
2019–2020	→ Ascoli (loan)	15	(5)
2020	→ Sheffield Wednesday (loan)	14	(0)
2020–2021	→ Groningen (loan)	22	(4)
2021	→ Santos Laguna (loan)	8	(3)
2022	→ Vicenza (loan)	19	(2)
2022–2023	KV Mechelen	28	(3)
2023–2024	Feralpisalò	1	(0)
2024–2025	Fortuna Sittard	33	(5)
2025–2026	Athletic	13	(3)
2026-	Anorthosis	13	(2)

International career^{‡}
2014	Netherlands U18	6	(0)
2018	Netherlands U20	1	(0)
2023–	Cape Verde	1	(0)
- * Club domestic league appearances and goals as of 13 October 2026 ‡ National team caps and goals as of 27 March 2023

Alessio Sergio Fernando da Cruz (Portuguese: [ɐ.ˈlɛ.si.u ˈsɛɾ.ʒi.u fɨɾ.ˈnɐ̃.du dɐ kɾuʃ]; born 18 January 1997) is a professional footballer who plays as a forward or winger for Cypriot club Anorthosis. Born in the Netherlands, he plays for the Cape Verde national team.

== Club career ==
Da Cruz was scouted aged 10 by Ajax at local side BAS in Biddinghuizen and also played in the youth teams of Almere City and FC Twente. He made his Eredivisie debut on 15 August 2015 against ADO Den Haag. He replaced Bruno Uvini at half-time in a 1–4 home defeat. He was sent out on loan to FC Dordrecht in 2016. Da Cruz left Twente in July 2017 to join up with Italian side Novara. During his time at Novara he went on to put in some impressive displays. Altogether Da Cruz was capped for a sum of 19 matches and scored 5 goals during his six months at the club.

In January 2018, despite mounting interest from English club Arsenal, he signed up with Serie B side Parma for €3 million.

On 11 January 2019, Da Cruz joined Italian Serie B side Spezia on loan until 30 June 2019.

On 1 August 2019, Da Cruz joined Ascoli on loan with an option to buy.

On 29 January 2020, Da Cruz joined English Championship side Sheffield Wednesday on loan until the end of the season.

On 3 October 2020, Da Cruz moved to Dutch Eredivisie club Groningen on a one-season loan deal with an option to buy.

On 3 August 2021, Da Cruz joined Liga MX club Santos Laguna on loan for a season.

On 10 January 2022, he returned to Italy and joined Vicenza on loan.

On 12 July 2022, Da Cruz signed with Mechelen in Belgium for two years with an option to extend.

On 16 January 2024, Da Cruz's contract with Feralpisalò was terminated by mutual consent. Following his departure, he joined Fortuna Sittard on a multi-year contract.

On 28 January 2026, Da Cruz left Athletic and signed for Cypriot side Anorthosis on an 18-month contract.

== International career ==
Born in the Netherlands, Da Cruz is of Cape Verdean descent. He is a youth international for the Netherlands.

In March 2022 he was called up by Cape Verde national football team for 3 friendlies to be held at the end of that month.

== Career statistics ==
As of end of 2021–22 season

Appearances and goals by club, season and competition
Club	Season	League			Cup		League Cup		Other		Total	
Club	Season	Division	Apps	Goals	Apps	Goals	Apps	Goals	Apps	Goals	Apps	Goals
Jong FC Twente	2014–15	Eerste Divisie	6	1	—		—		—		6	1
FC Twente	2015–16	Eredivisie	3	0	1	0	—		0	0	4	0
FC Dordrecht (loan)	2016–17	Eerste Divisie	29	5	1	0	—		0	0	30	5
Novara	2017–18	Serie B	19	5	0	0	—		0	0	19	5
Parma	2017–18	Serie B	6	0	0	0	—		0	0	6	0
Parma	2018–19	Serie A	3	0	1	0	—		0	0	4	0
Parma	2019–20	Serie A	0	0	0	0	—		0	0	0	0
Parma	2020–21	Serie A	0	0	0	0	—		0	0	0	0
Parma	2021–22	Serie A	0	0	0	0	—		0	0	0	0
Parma	Total		9	0	1	0	—		0	0	10	0
Spezia (loan)	2018–19	Serie B	14	2	0	0	—		0	0	14	2
Ascoli (loan)	2018–19	Serie B	15	5	3	1	—		0	0	18	6
Sheffield Wednesday (loan)	2019–20	EFL Championship	14	0	1	0	0	0	0	0	15	0
Groningen (loan)	2020–21	Eredivisie	23	4	0	0	0	0	0	0	23	4
Santos Laguna (loan)	2021–22	Liga MX	8	3	0	0	—		1 (Note: Appearance(s) in Leagues Cup)	0	9	3
Vicenza (loan)	2021–22	Serie B	21	2	0	0	0	0	0	0	21	2
Career total			161	27	7	1	0	0	1	0	169	28
