= Peter Leeuwenburgh =

Dutch footballer (born 1994)

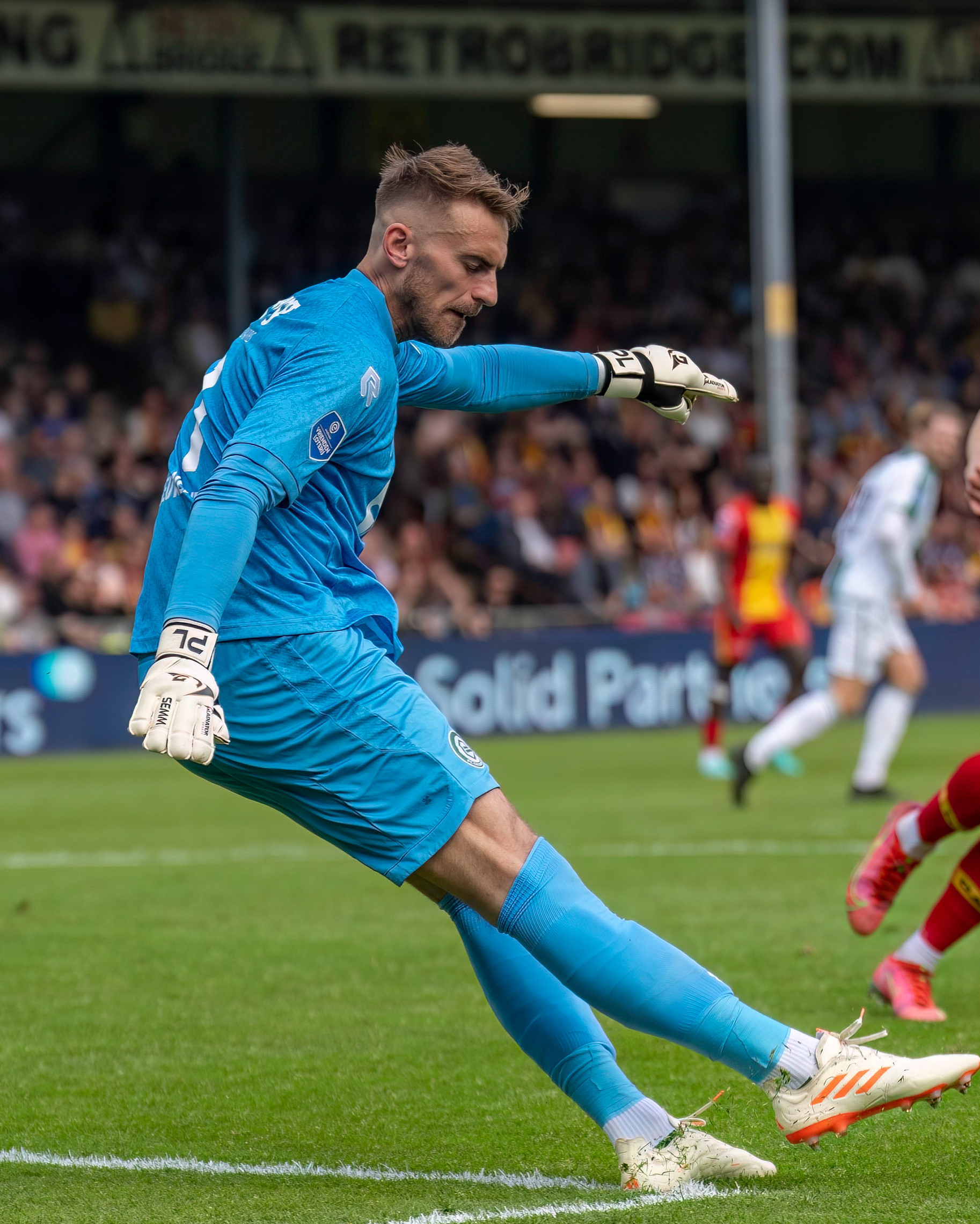
- Leeuwenburgh playing for FC Groningen in 2023

Personal information
- Date of birth: 23 March 1994 (age 32)
- Place of birth: Heinenoord, Netherlands
- Height: 1.96 m (6 ft 5 in)
- Position: Goalkeeper

Team information
- Current team: Apollon Limassol
- Number: 41

Youth career
- –2004: SHO
- 2004–2013: Ajax

Senior career*
Years	Team	Apps	(Gls)
2013–2018	Ajax	0	(0)
2013–2018	Jong Ajax	15	(0)
2015	→ FC Dordrecht (loan)	2	(0)
2018–2021	Cape Town City	85	(0)
2021–2023	FC Groningen	42	(0)
2023–	Apollon Limassol	57	(0)

International career^{‡}
2010–2011	Netherlands U17	4	(0)
2012–2013	Netherlands U19	2	(0)
2014	Netherlands U20	3	(0)
Medal record
Men's football
Representing Netherlands
UEFA European Under-17 Championship
Winner	2011 Serbia
- * Club domestic league appearances and goals as of 14 June 2026 ‡ National team caps and goals as of 17 December 2014 (UTC)

Peter Leeuwenburgh (born 23 March 1994) is a Dutch professional footballer who plays as a goalkeeper for Cypriot club Apollon Limassol.

== Club career ==
=== Ajax ===
Leeuwenburgh joined Ajax from SHO, a local team from Oud-Beijerland, in 2004. He made his professional debut for the reserves team, Jong Ajax in a 4–2 Eerste Divisie win at Jong PSV on 2 September 2013.

On 4 June 2015, it was announced that Leeuwenburgh was sent on loan at FC Dordrecht for the 2015–16 season.

=== Cape Town City ===
On 26 July 2018, Leeuwenburgh signed for South African club Cape Town City on a three-year deal, playing in the Premier Soccer League, the top-tier in South African football.

=== Groningen ===
On 13 April 2021, it was announced that Leeuwenburgh would return to the Netherlands in the summer of 2021, to pry his trade at FC Groningen, where he will replace Sergio Padt.

=== Apollon Limassol ===
On 12 August 2023, Leeuwenburgh signed a two-year contract with Apollon Limassol in Cyprus.

== Career statistics ==
=== Club ===
As of match played 16 March 2025

Appearances and goals by club, season and competition
Club	Season	League			National cup (Note: Includes KNVB Cup, Nedbank Cup, Cypriot Cup)		League cup (Note: Includes Telkom Knockout Cup)		Continental		Other		Total	
Club	Season	Division	Apps	Goals	Apps	Goals	Apps	Goals	Apps	Goals	Apps	Goals	Apps	Goals
Ajax	2013-14	Eredivisie	0	0	0	0	—		0	0	0	0	0	0
Ajax	2014-15	Eredivisie	0	0	0	0	—		0	0	0	0	0	0
Ajax	Total		0	0	0	0	—		0	0	0	0	0	0
Jong Ajax	2013-14	Eerste Divisie	3	0	—		—		—		—		3	0
Jong Ajax	2014-15	Eerste Divisie	7	0	—		—		—		—		7	0
Jong Ajax	2015-16	Eerste Divisie	0	0	—		—		—		—		0	0
Jong Ajax	2016-17	Eerste Divisie	5	0	—		—		—		—		5	0
Jong Ajax	2017-18	Eerste Divisie	0	0	—		—		—		—		0	0
Jong Ajax	Total		15	0	—		—		—		—		15	0
Dordrecht (loan)	2015-16	Eerste Divisie	2	0	2	0	—		—		—		2	0
Cape Town City	2018-19	South African Premiership	28	0	3	0	0	0	—		4 (Note: Appearance(s) in MTN 8)	0	35	0
Cape Town City	2019-20	South African Premiership	25	0	0	0	1	0	—		1	0	27	0
Cape Town City	2020-21	South African Premiership	28	0	2	0	—		—		1	0	31	0
Cape Town City	Total		81	0	5	0	1	0	—		6	0	93	0
Groningen	2021-22	Eredivisie	34	0	1	0	—		—		—		35	0
Groningen	2022-23	Eredivisie	8	0	1	0	—		—		—		9	0
Groningen	Total		42	0	2	0	—		—		—		44	0
Apollon Limassol	2023-24	Cypriot First Division	33	0	4	0	—		—		—		37	0
Apollon Limassol	2024-25	Cypriot First Division	9	0	0	0	—		—		—		9	0
Apollon Limassol	Total		42	0	4	0	—		—		—		46	0
Career total			182	0	13	0	1	0	0	0	6	0	202	0

== Honours ==
Ajax

- Eredivisie: 2013–14
- KNVB Cup: 2013–14
- Johan Cruijff Shield: 2013

Jong Ajax

- Eerste Divisie: 2017–18

Cape Town City

- MTN 8: 2018

Netherlands U-17

- UEFA European Under-17 Football Championship: 2011
