= Alex Mortensen (footballer) =

English footballer (born 2002)

Personal information
- Full name: Alex Jens Kenneth Mortensen
- Date of birth: 13 July 2002 (age 24)
- Place of birth: Sweden
- Height: 1.75 m (5 ft 9 in)
- Position: Forward

Team information
- Current team: Groningen
- Number: 33

Youth career
- Kalmar

Senior career*
Years	Team	Apps	(Gls)
2020–2022	Kalmar	0	(0)
2021–2022	→ Groningen (loan)	2	(0)
2022–	Groningen	2	(0)
- * Club domestic league appearances and goals as of 26 October 2024

Alex Jens Kenneth Mortensen (born 13 July 2002) is a Swedish professional footballer who plays as a forward. He is under contract with the Dutch Eredivisie club Groningen.

== Club career ==
A youth product of Kalmar, Mortensen made his professional debut with them in a 4–1 Svenska Cupen win over Asarums on 20 October 2020. He signed his first professional contract with Kalmar on 20 December 2020.

On 2 July 2021, he joined the Eredivisie club Groningen on loan for the 2021–22 season, with an option to buy. He debuted with Groningen in the Eredisivie in a 1–1 tie with Twente on 1 October 2021, coming on as a late sub in the 94th minute. The deal became permanent on 15 May 2022, with Mortensen signing a two-year contract.

Just five days later, Groningen announced that Mortensen suffered a serious knee injury and will not be able to play for an extended period of time.

== Personal life ==
In December 2020, on the way home from training Mortensen saw a man about to climb off the E22 in Sweden attempting to commit suicide. Mortensen, then 18 years old, prevented the man from jumping and got a bystander to call a police, and resolve the issue.
