= Bart van Hintum =

Dutch footballer (born 1987)

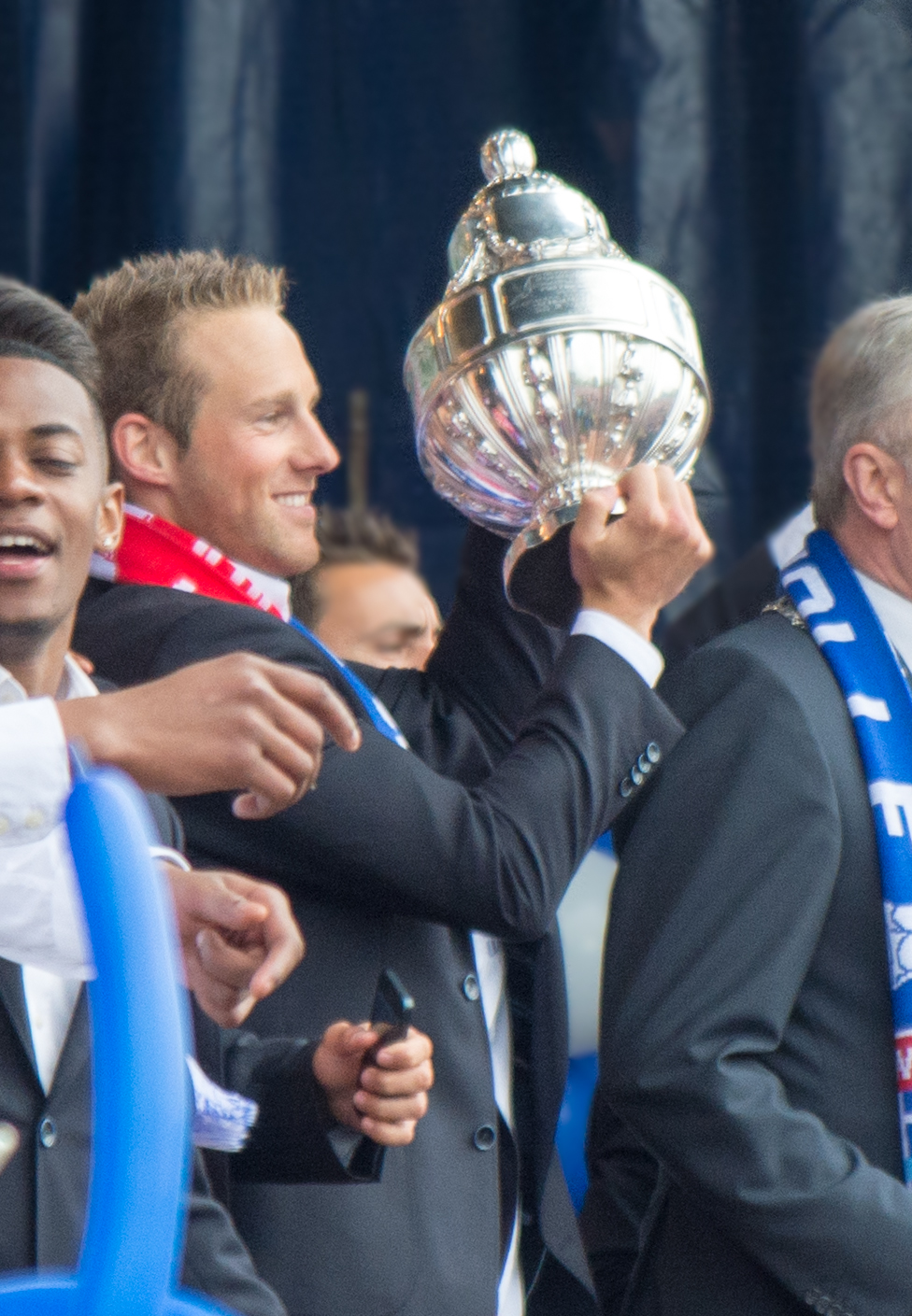
- Van Hintum lifting the KNVB Cup for PEC Zwolle in 2014

Personal information
- Date of birth: 16 January 1987 (age 39)
- Place of birth: Oss, Netherlands
- Height: 1.77 m (5 ft 10 in)
- Position: Left-back

Team information
- Current team: Alcmaria Victrix

Youth career
- FC Schadewijk
- PSV
- TOP Oss

Senior career*
Years	Team	Apps	(Gls)
2005–2010	TOP Oss	113	(8)
2010–2011	Dordrecht	32	(4)
2011–2016	PEC Zwolle	133	(9)
2016–2017	Gaziantepspor	15	(0)
2017–2019	Heracles Almelo	35	(1)
2019–2022	Groningen	74	(2)
2022–2023	PEC Zwolle	38	(1)
2023–2024	ADO Den Haag	27	(0)
2024–	Alcmaria Victrix		
- * Club domestic league appearances and goals

Bart van Hintum (born 16 January 1987) is a Dutch footballer who plays as a left-back for Derde Klasse club Alcmaria Victrix.

== Career ==
Van Hintum started playing in the youth department of FC Schadewijk before joining youth teams of PSV and later TOP Oss. In 2005, he was promoted to the first team of second division club TOP Oss. In his first season with the team, he made his professional debut and finished the season with a single league appearance. Afterwards, he established himself as a starter during the 2006–07 season, which he maintained until the summer of 2010. That summer, his club, which had at that point been renamed FC Oss, suffered relegation to the third tier.

After the relegation, van Hintum left his hometown club and continued his career at the second-tier club FC Dordrecht. A season later, he moved again within the league and this time signed with PEC Zwolle. With this club he won the 2011–12 Eerste Divisie, and thus secured promotion to the Eredivisie. In the 2013–14 season, van Hintum and Zwolle won the KNVB Cup, the Dutch national cup tournament, for the first time in club history. With this win, Zwolle qualified for the Johan Cruyff Shield, the Dutch Supercup, in summer 2014. This was also won, as Zwolle beat defending Dutch champions Ajax 1–0 and also won this trophy for the first time in the club's history.

Before the 2016–17 season, van Hintum moved to Turkish Süper Lig club Gaziantepspor. He suffered relegation with the club during his sole season there, and moved to Heracles Almelo afterwards. Two years later, he moved to FC Groningen.

On 5 April 2022, it was announced that van Hintum would return to PEC Zwolle for the 2022–23 season. He signed a one-year contract with an option for an additional year. He then had a spell at ADO Den Haag.

Van Hintum retired from professional football on 15 June 2024, and moved to amateur club Alcmaria Victrix, competing in the eighth tier. He was sent-off in his final professional game.

== Career statistics ==
As of match played 25 May 2024

Appearances and goals by club, season and competition
Club	Season	League			National cup		Continental		Other		Total	
Club	Season	Division	Apps	Goals	Apps	Goals	Apps	Goals	Apps	Goals	Apps	Goals
TOP Oss	2005–06	Eerste Divisie	1	0	0	0	—		—		1	0
TOP Oss	2006–07	Eerste Divisie	18	0	0	0	—		—		18	0
TOP Oss	2007–08	Eerste Divisie	32	1	0	0	—		2 (Note: Appearances in Eredivisie promotion/relegation playoffs)	0	34	1
TOP Oss	2008–09	Eerste Divisie	34	5	1	0	—		2	0	37	5
TOP Oss	2009–10	Eerste Divisie	28	2	0	0	—		0	0	28	2
TOP Oss	Total		113	8	1	0	—		4	0	121	8
Dordrecht	2010–11	Eerste Divisie	32	4	2	1	—		—		34	5
PEC Zwolle	2011–12	Eerste Divisie	32	5	2	0	—		—		34	5
PEC Zwolle	2012–13	Eredivisie	12	2	2	0	—		—		14	2
PEC Zwolle	2013–14	Eredivisie	28	0	6	1	—		—		34	1
PEC Zwolle	2014–15	Eredivisie	35	1	6	1	2 (Note: Appearances in UEFA Europa League)	0	1 (Note: Appearance in Johan Cruijff Shield)	0	44	2
PEC Zwolle	2015–16	Eredivisie	26	1	1	0	—		—		27	1
PEC Zwolle	Total		133	9	17	2	2	0	1	0	153	11
Gaziantepspor	2016–17	Süper Lig	15	1	0	0	—		—		15	1
Heracles	2017–18	Eredivisie	9	0	0	0	—		—		9	0
Heracles	2018–19	Eredivisie	26	1	0	0	—		—		26	1
Heracles	Total		35	1	0	0	—		—		35	1
Groningen	2019–20	Eredivisie	14	0	1	0	—		—		15	0
Groningen	2020–21	Eredivisie	32	2	1	0	—		—		33	2
Groningen	2021–22	Eredivisie	28	0	3	0	—		—		31	0
Groningen	Total		74	2	5	0	—		—		79	2
PEC Zwolle	2022–23	Eerste Divisie	35	1	2	0	—		—		37	1
PEC Zwolle	2023–24	Eredivisie	3	0	0	0	—		—		3	0
PEC Zwolle	Total		38	1	2	0	—		—		40	1
PEC Zwolle	PEC Zwolle total		171	9	19	2	—		—		193	11
ADO Den Haag	2023–24	Eerste Divisie	27	0	2	0	—		2	0	31	0
Career total			467	24	27	3	2	0	7	0	510	27

== Honours ==
PEC Zwolle

- Eerste Divisie: 2011–12
- KNVB Cup: 2013–14
- Johan Cruijff Shield: 2014
