= Wessel Dammers =

Dutch footballer (born 1995)

Personal information
- Date of birth: 1 March 1995 (age 31)
- Place of birth: Ouderkerk aan den IJssel, Netherlands
- Height: 1.85 m (6 ft 1 in)
- Position: Centre-back

Team information
- Current team: Randers
- Number: 4

Youth career
- VV Spirit
- Feyenoord

Senior career*
Years	Team	Apps	(Gls)
2014–2017	Feyenoord	0	(0)
2015–2016	→ Cambuur (loan)	19	(0)
2017–2020	Fortuna Sittard	65	(4)
2020–2022	Groningen	45	(1)
2022	→ Willem II (loan)	14	(1)
2022–2023	Willem II	34	(1)
2023–	Randers	92	(9)

International career
2012–2013	Netherlands U18	2	(0)
2013–2014	Netherlands U19	7	(1)
2014	Netherlands U20	1	(0)
2014	Netherlands U21	1	(0)
- * Club domestic league appearances and goals as of 19 May 2026

Wessel Dammers (born 1 March 1995) is a Dutch professional footballer who plays as a centre-back for and captains Danish Superliga club Randers.

== Club career ==
Dammers started playing football at hometown club Spirit and became a youth exponent from Feyenoord. He made his senior debut on 11 December 2014 against Standard Liège in a UEFA Europa League game. He replaced Terence Kongolo after 67 minutes in a 0–3 away win. He left the club for Fortuna Sittard in summer 2017.

On 27 March 2020, Dammers signed a three-year contract with Groningen. On 29 January 2022, Dammers joined Willem II on loan until the end of the season.

On 24 August 2022, Dammers returned to Willem II on a permanent basis and signed a three-year contract. A year later, on 25 June 2023, Dammers signed a three-year deal with Danish Superliga club Randers FC. Just before the 2024–25 season he was appointed captain, replacing Björn Kopplin. In January 2026 he extended his contract until 2030, despite speculation that he would leave at the end of his contract.

== Honours ==
Individual

- Eredivisie Team of the Month: May 2022
- Eerste Divisie Team of the Year: 2022–23
