= Mohamed El Hankouri =

Footballer (born 1997)

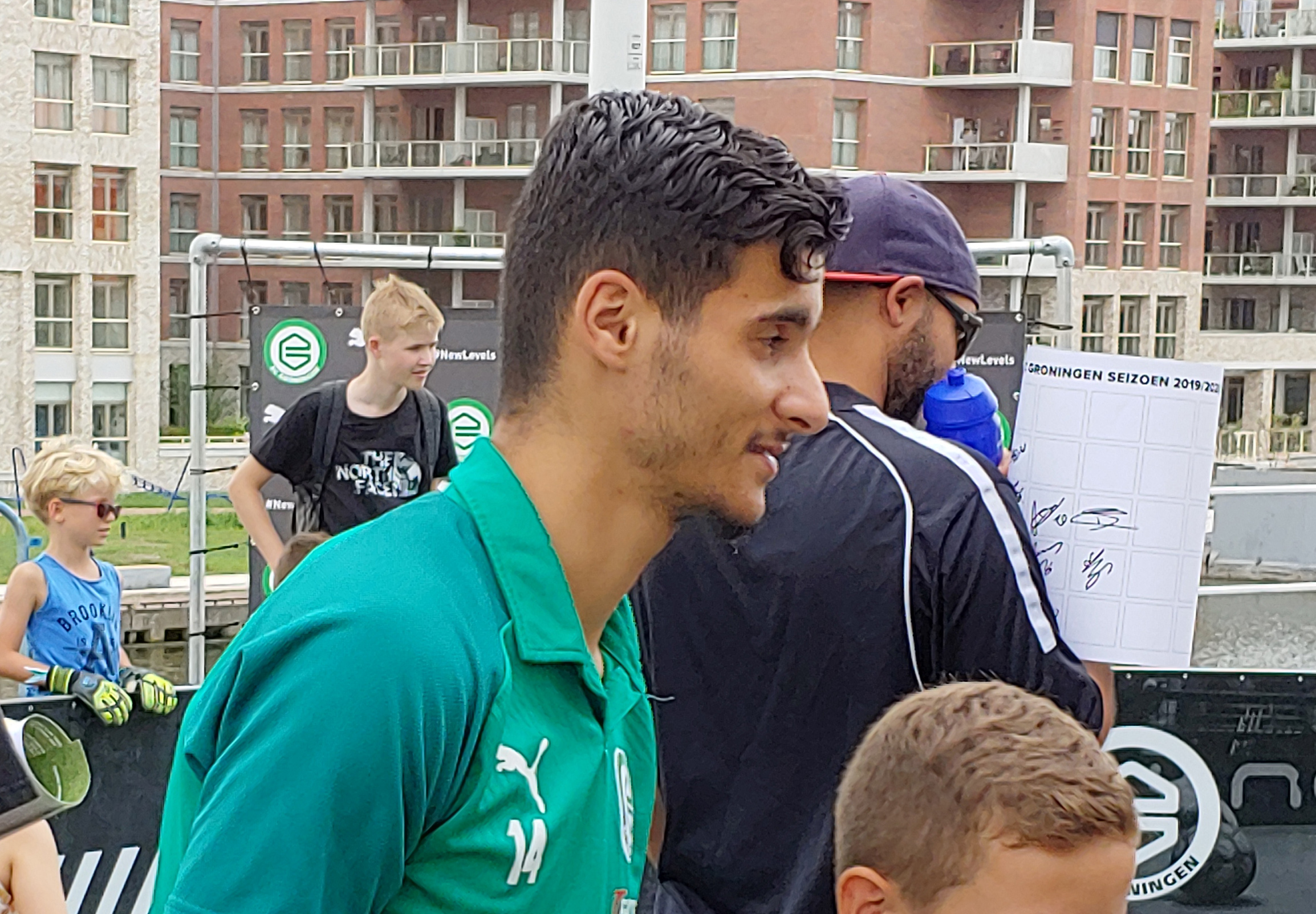
- El Hankouri with Groningen in 2019

Personal information
- Date of birth: 1 July 1997 (age 29)
- Place of birth: Rotterdam, Netherlands
- Height: 1.76 m (5 ft 9 in)
- Position: Winger

Team information
- Current team: Standard Liège
- Number: 27

Youth career
- –2008: RKSV Spartaan
- 2008−2016: Feyenoord

Senior career*
Years	Team	Apps	(Gls)
2016−2019	Feyenoord	6	(0)
2017−2018	→ Willem II (loan)	21	(0)
2019	→ Groningen (loan)	16	(1)
2019−2022	Groningen	84	(4)
2022–2025	1. FC Magdeburg	71	(13)
2025–	Standard Liège	15	(0)

International career^{‡}
2016	Netherlands U20	1	(0)
2018	Morocco U23	1	(1)
- * Club domestic league appearances and goals as of 31 May 2026 ‡ National team caps and goals as of 15 September 2018

Mohamed El Hankouri (born 1 July 1997) is a professional footballer who plays as a winger for Belgian Pro League club Standard Liège. Born in the Netherlands, he has represented Morocco at youth level.

== Club career ==
El Hankouri rose through the Feyenoord youth ranks. He made his debut for Feyenoord on 27 August 2016 in an Eredivisie game against Excelsior Rotterdam. He came on as a substitute for Steven Berghuis in the 81st minute, in 4–1 home match win. On 16 January 2019, El Hankouri completed a move to FC Groningen going on loan for the remainder of the season first, after which he will sign a two-year contract for a permanent move.

In June 2022 German club 1. FC Magdeburg, newly promoted to the 2. Bundesliga, announced the singing of El Hankouri for the 2022–23 season.

On 1 August 2025, El Hankouri signed a two-season contract with Standard Liège in Belgium.

== International career ==
El Hankouri was born in the Netherlands and is of Moroccan descent. He represented the Netherlands U20s in a 1–1 friendly tie with the Netherlands U20s on 14 November 2016. He most recently represented the Morocco U23s in a 1–1 friendly tie with the Tunisia U23s on 9 September 2018, scoring his side's only goal.

== Personal life ==
El Hankouri is the older brother of the Moroccan footballer Redouan El Hankouri.

== Career statistics ==
As of match played 1 July 2024

Appearances and goals by club, season and competition
Club	Season	League			Cup (Note: Includes KNVB Cup, DFB-Pokal.)		Continental		Other		Total	
Club	Season	Division	Apps	Goals	Apps	Goals	Apps	Goals	Apps	Goals	Apps	Goals
Feyenoord	2016–17	Eredivisie	1	0	1	0	—		—		2	0
Feyenoord	2018–19	Eredivisie	5	0	1	0	—		—		6	0
Feyenoord	Total		6	0	2	0	0	0	0	0	8	0
Willem II (loan)	2017–18	Eredivisie	21	0	4	0	—		—		25	0
Groningen (loan)	2018–19	Eredivisie	16	1	0	0	—		1 (Note: Appearance in Eredivisie play-offs)	0	17	1
Groningen	2019–20	Eredivisie	21	0	2	0	—		—		23	0
Groningen	2020–21	Eredivisie	33	3	0	0	—		1	0	34	3
Groningen	2021–22	Eredivisie	30	1	3	1	—		—		33	2
Groningen	Total		84	4	5	1	0	0	1	0	90	5
1. FC Magdeburg	2022–23	2. Bundesliga	31	2	0	0	—		—		31	2
1. FC Magdeburg	2023–24	2. Bundesliga	18	5	1	0	—		—		19	5
1. FC Magdeburg	2024–25	2. Bundesliga	0	0	0	0	—		—		0	0
1. FC Magdeburg	Total		49	7	1	0	0	0	0	0	50	7
Career total			176	12	12	1	0	0	2	0	190	13

== Honours ==
Feyenoord

- Eredivisie: 2016–17
- Johan Cruyff Shield: 2017, 2018
