= Damil Dankerlui =

Surinamese footballer (born 1996)

Personal information
- Full name: Damil Serena Dankerlui Wadilie
- Date of birth: 24 August 1996 (age 30)
- Place of birth: Almere Haven, Netherlands
- Height: 1.85 m (6 ft 1 in)
- Position: Right-back

Team information
- Current team: Stjarnan
- Number: 15

Youth career
- 2001–2005: SV Almere
- 2005–2010: FC Omniworld
- 2010–2012: Almere City
- 2012–2015: Ajax

Senior career*
Years	Team	Apps	(Gls)
2013–2018	Ajax	0	(0)
2013–2018	Jong Ajax	71	(2)
2018–2020	Willem II	55	(4)
2020–2023	Groningen	62	(0)
2023–2024	Panserraikos	20	(0)
2024–2025	Almere City	8	(0)
2025–	Stjarnan	19	(1)

International career^{‡}
2021–	Suriname	11	(0)
- * Club domestic league appearances and goals as of 16 November 2026 ‡ National team caps and goals as of 09:33, 19 August 2025 (UTC)

Damil Serena Dankerlui Wadilie (born 24 August 1996) is a professional footballer who plays as a right-back for Icelandic club Stjarnan. Born in the Netherlands, he plays for the Suriname national team.

== Club career ==
=== Early career ===
Born and raised in Almere Haven to parents from Suriname, Dankerlui began his football career with local SV Almere before transferring to nearby FC Omniworld in 2005. In 2010, the club was then rebranded as Almere City FC, from where Dankerlui transferred to the youth ranks of partner club Ajax at the age of 16 two years later.

=== Ajax ===
While registered as part of the clubs' B1 selection (under-17 team), he made his professional debut in the Dutch Eerste Divisie on 22 October 2013, playing for the reserves team Jong Ajax as a 69th-minute substitute for Derwin Martina, in a 5–1 away loss against VVV-Venlo. The following season saw Dankerlui registered with the A1 selection (under-19 team), where he made his continental debut at youth level in the UEFA Youth League on 21 October 2014, in a 2–2 draw against Barcelona. Despite appearing on the bench for the first team of Ajax, he was never substituted on, plying his trade for the reserves team before leaving the club in January 2018.

=== Willem II ===
On 9 January 2018, it was announced that Dankerlui had transferred to Willem II, signing a two-year deal with the Eredivisie club from Tilburg.

=== Groningen ===
On 27 July 2020, Dankerlui joined fellow Eredivisie side Groningen on a four-year deal.

=== Almere City ===
On 29 August 2024, Dankerlui returned to his youth club Almere City.

On 13 August 2025, Dankerlui signed for Besta deild karla side Stjarnan.

== International career ==
On 15 October 2020, it was announced that Dankerlui had opted to represent the Suriname national team internationally. Although Suriname does not allow dual citizenship, the country have made an exception to issue special passports for athletes in the diaspora who want to represent Suriname as of 2019. Dankerlui became eligible to play for the national team as of 13 November 2020. He made his debut on 24 March 2021 in a World Cup qualifier against the Cayman Islands. Dankerlui was also subsequently called up in June 2021 to represent Suriname at the 2021 CONCACAF Gold Cup.

== Career statistics ==
As of 1 July 2022

Appearances and goals by club, season and competition
Club	Season	League			KNVB Cup		Other		Total	
Club	Season	Division	Apps	Goals	Apps	Goals	Apps	Goals	Apps	Goals
Jong Ajax	2013–14	Eerste Divisie	1	0	–		–		1	0
Jong Ajax	2014–15	Eerste Divisie	5	0	–		–		5	0
Jong Ajax	2015–16	Eerste Divisie	29	0	–		–		29	0
Jong Ajax	2016–17	Eerste Divisie	36	2	–		–		36	2
Jong Ajax	2017-18	Eerste Divisie	11	0	–		–		11	0
Jong Ajax	Total		82	2	0	0	0	0	82	2
Willem II	2017–18	Eredivisie	7	0	2	0	–		9	0
Willem II	2018–19	Eredivisie	32	3	6	0	–		38	3
Willem II	2019–20	Eredivisie	16	1	2	1	–		18	2
Willem II	Total		55	4	10	1	0	0	65	5
FC Groningen	2020–21	Eredivisie	28	0	1	0	1 (Note: Appearance in play-offs for UEFA Europa League)	0	30	0
FC Groningen	2020–21	Eredivisie	26	0	2	0	–		28	0
FC Groningen	Total		54	0	3	0	1	0	58	0
Career total			191	6	13	1	1	0	205	7
