= Dominique van Dijk =

Dutch footballer

Personal information
- Full name: Dominique van Dijk
- Date of birth: 5 September 1979 (age 47)
- Place of birth: Groningen, Netherlands
- Height: 1.83 m (6 ft 0 in)
- Position: Midfielder

Youth career
- LTC Assen
- 1991–1998: Groningen

Senior career*
Years	Team	Apps	(Gls)
1998–2001	Groningen	42	(3)
2001–2005	Cambuur	122	(20)
2005–2006	RKC	29	(3)
2006–2007	Sparta	15	(1)
2007–2009	Go Ahead Eagles	21	(4)
2008–2009	→ Volendam (loan)	26	(5)
2009–2012	Volendam	71	(8)
- * Club domestic league appearances and goals as of 22 October 2012 (UTC)

Dominique van Dijk (born 5 September 1979) is a Dutch retired footballer who played as a midfielder.

== Club career ==
Born in Groningen, Van Dijk came through the youth system of amateur side LTC Assen. He was picked up by FC Groningen at age 12, and made his first-team debut on 17 October 1998 against VVV-Venlo in the second division. He was signed by Cambuur Leeuwarden in summer 2001, making his debut in a 1–1 draw against HFC Haarlem in the Eerste Divisie on 17 August 2001.

He signed for Eredivisie side RKC Waalwijk in May 2005. He made his debut in a 2–1 win against his former club FC Groningen. He signed for Sparta Rotterdam in the 2006 transfer window. He eventually made his debut in a 1–2 defeat to Vitesse Arnhem on 18 August 2006. Van Dijk played 15 league matches for Sparta. He finished the 2006–07 season with 15 league appearances and 1 goal. He moved to fellow Eerste Divisie side Go Ahead Eagles on a free transfer in July, making his debut in a 6–0 win against FC Emmen, scoring two goals himself.

He was loaned out to FC Volendam in the 2008–09 season, and at the end of the season, he was signed permanently by the club.

== Personal life ==
He is a son of former footballer and coach, Jan van Dijk, and older brother of fellow footballer Gregoor van Dijk. He started his own fashion brand, Leger des Stijls when still a football player.
