= Leonel Miguel =

Dutch footballer (born 2001)

Personal information
- Full name: Leonel Miquel Francisco Miguel
- Date of birth: 24 March 2001 (age 25)
- Place of birth: The Hague, Netherlands
- Height: 1.83 m (6 ft 0 in)
- Position: Centre-back

Team information
- Current team: TOP Oss
- Number: 3

Youth career
- –2012: VV Zuidhorn
- 2012–2020: Groningen

Senior career*
Years	Team	Apps	(Gls)
2020–2021	Groningen	1	(0)
2021–2022	Emmen	7	(0)
2022–2024	Sporting B	47	(0)
2023–2024	Sporting Gijón	2	(0)
2024–	TOP Oss	61	(3)
- * Club domestic league appearances and goals as of 28 April 2026

Leonel Miquel Francisco Miguel (born 24 March 2001) is a Dutch footballer who plays as a centre-back for Eerste Divisie club TOP Oss.

== Club career ==
Born in The Hague, Miguel joined FC Groningen's youth categories in 2012, from VV Zuidhorn. He made his first team – and Eredivisie – debut on 16 May 2021, starting in a 1–0 away loss against PEC Zwolle.

On 25 June 2021, Miguel signed for Eerste Divisie side FC Emmen. He featured in only seven matches during the season, as his side achieved promotion as champions.

On 10 September 2022, Miguel moved abroad and joined Spanish side Sporting de Gijón, being initially assigned to the reserves in Tercera División. He made his first team debut the following 8 April, coming on as a late substitute for Víctor Campuzano in a 3–1 Segunda División away win over UD Ibiza.

On 6 August 2024, Miguel signed with TOP Oss for two seasons, with the club option to extend for two more.

== Honours ==
Emmen

- Eerste Divisie: 2021–22
