= Paulos Abraham =

Swedish footballer (born 2002)

Personal information
- Full name: Paulos Johannes Abraham
- Date of birth: 16 July 2002 (age 24)
- Place of birth: Husby, Stockholm, Sweden
- Height: 1.76 m (5 ft 9 in)
- Positions: Winger; striker

Team information
- Current team: Hammarby IF
- Number: 7

Youth career
- 2009–2019: IF Brommapojkarna

Senior career*
Years	Team	Apps	(Gls)
2020	IF Brommapojkarna	0	(0)
2020–2021	AIK	26	(3)
2021	→ Groningen (loan)	14	(2)
2021–2025	Groningen	43	(1)
2024	→ IFK Göteborg (loan)	22	(7)
2025–	Hammarby IF	55	(25)

International career^{‡}
2018	Sweden U17	3	(0)
2019	Sweden U19	2	(0)
2020–2022	Sweden U21	8	(2)
- * Club domestic league appearances and goals as of 7 November 2026 ‡ National team caps and goals as of 21 September 2026

Paulos Johannes Abraham (born 16 July 2002) is a Swedish professional footballer who plays as a left-winger and striker for Allsvenskan club Hammarby IF.

== Career ==
Abraham began playing football at the age of seven for Stockholm side IF Brommapojkarna. He was noted for 57 goals in 54 matches during his youth years with the club, before getting promoted to the first team and signing his first professional contract on 8 February 2020. Abraham made his senior debut in the Svenska Cupen against GIF Sundsvall, in which he scored in the 11th minute.

On 17 March 2020, Abraham left Brommapojkarna for a move to the Swedish giants AIK on a four-year contract. He made his debut for the club against Örebro SK on 14 June 2020, and scored his first goal for the club against Malmö FF in the Svenska Cupen on 25 June 2020. During his only season at AIK, he played 27 games and scored 4 goals in all competitions.

On 1 February 2021, Abraham was announced at Groningen on an initial loan period from 1 February 2021 to 30 June 2021, and then the transfer would be made permanent on 1 July 2021. He scored his first goal for the club against Fortuna Sittard on 28 February 2021, scoring in the 50th minute. This goal made him the youngest Swedish player to ever score in the Eredivisie.

On 21 March 2024, Abraham was announced at IFK Göteborg on a loan deal until the end of 2024.

On 9 January 2025, Abraham was announced at Hammarby IF on a four year contract.

== International career ==
Born in Sweden, Abraham is of Eritrean descent. On 13 October 2020, Abraham became the first player born in 2002 to score for the Sweden U21 national team, scoring twice and assisting once over Armenia U21.

== Career statistics ==
=== Club ===
As of 15 June 2020

Appearances and goals by club, season and competition
Club	Season	League			Cup		Continental		Other		Total	
Club	Season	Division allsvenskan	Apps	Goals	Apps	Goals	Apps	Goals	Apps	Goals	Apps	Goals
IF Brommapojkarna	2020	Ettan	0	0	3 (Note: Appearances in the Svenska Cupen)	1	–		0	0	3	1
AIK	2020	Allsvenskan	27	3	4	2	–		0	0	31	5
Career total			27	3	7	3	0	0	0	0	34	6
