= Kian Slor =

Dutch footballer (born 2002)

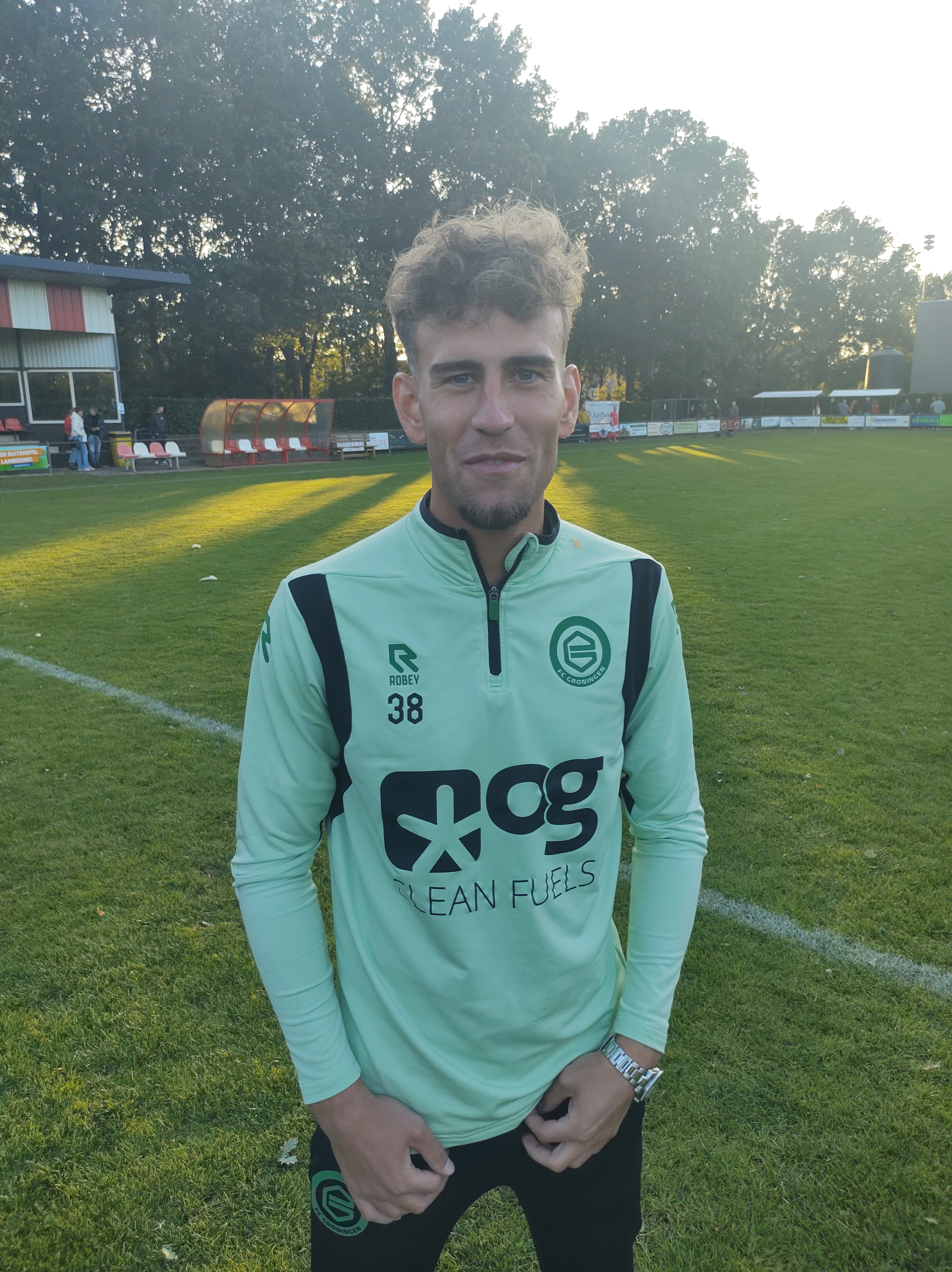
- Slor with Groningen in 2023

Personal information
- Date of birth: 23 March 2002 (age 24)
- Place of birth: Sappemeer, Netherlands
- Height: 1.81 m (5 ft 11 in)
- Position: Winger

Team information
- Current team: Quick Boys
- Number: 21

Youth career
- VV Hoogezand
- Groningen

Senior career*
Years	Team	Apps	(Gls)
2020–2024	Groningen	11	(0)
2021–2022	→ Emmen (loan)	5	(0)
2025–2026	ACV	46	(17)
2026–	Quick Boys	10	(8)
- * Club domestic league appearances and goals as of 11:00, 24 October 2026 (UTC)

Kian Slor (born 23 March 2002) is a Dutch footballer who plays as a winger for Tweede Divisie club Quick Boys.

Slor came through the FC Groningen academy and made his Eredivisie debut in 2020, but managed only twelve first-team appearances before the club terminated his contract in December 2024. He spent the 2021–22 season on loan at Emmen, who won the Eerste Divisie. He rebuilt his career at ACV, where he was the club's top scorer in 2025–26, and joined Quick Boys in 2026.

== Early life ==
Slor was born in Sappemeer. He began playing football at VV Hoogezand before joining the Groningen academy as a boy.

== Club career ==
=== Groningen ===
On 17 January 2020, aged 17, Slor signed his first professional contract with Groningen, a deal for two and a half years. Two weeks later, on 1 February, he made his Eredivisie debut away to PEC Zwolle. He came on 25 minutes from time and hit the post as Groningen lost narrowly.

On 31 August 2021, Groningen loaned Slor to Eerste Divisie club Emmen for the 2021–22 season, together with his teammate Joël van Kaam. He played only sparingly. In March 2022, De Telegraaf reported that Emmen had suspended him. According to the newspaper, the club doubted his repeated claims that he had not received the result of a PCR test that had in fact been positive. He missed several matches before returning to the squad. Emmen sealed the Eerste Divisie title on 29 April 2022.

Slor returned to Groningen after the loan but never made a breakthrough. He made twelve official appearances for the first team, all as a substitute, without scoring. In the summer of 2024, Groningen told him he could leave, but talks with VVV-Venlo and TOP Oss came to nothing. He spent the first half of the 2024–25 season training mainly with the under-21 side. On 16 December 2024, Groningen and Slor agreed to terminate his contract, as he had no prospect of playing time under head coach Dick Lukkien.

=== ACV ===
On 4 February 2025, Slor signed for Tweede Divisie club ACV in Assen on a contract until the end of the season. ACV later said he had grown into an important force in the team through his work rate, attacking threat and eye for goal. In the 2025–26 season, he was the club's top scorer by some distance with 16 league goals. He scored four times in the final league match against IJsselmeervogels. ACV were nonetheless relegated.

=== Quick Boys ===
Slor had already agreed to stay at ACV for the following season, but Quick Boys triggered a release clause in his contract. On 15 June 2026, he signed for Quick Boys, the two-time reigning Tweede Divisie champions, on a contract until the summer of 2027 with an option for a further season. Technical manager Gert Pluimgraaff cited his dribbling, creativity and scoring ability. Slor said he still hoped to become a professional footballer and saw Quick Boys as a springboard.

Slor made his debut on 16 August 2026 in the opening match of the 2026–27 season, a 5–0 win over RKAV Volendam. He scored after five minutes, headed in a cross from Tom Noordhoff in the 54th minute and completed his hat-trick in the 89th minute by rounding the goalkeeper. He was named man of the match. On 10 October, he scored twice in a 6–0 win over local rivals Katwijk. After nine matches, he led the Tweede Divisie scoring charts with eight goals.

== Personal life ==
Alongside football, Slor works for Hattrick Media, the company of former Groningen director Hans Nijland.
