= Patrick Joosten =

Dutch footballer (born 1996)

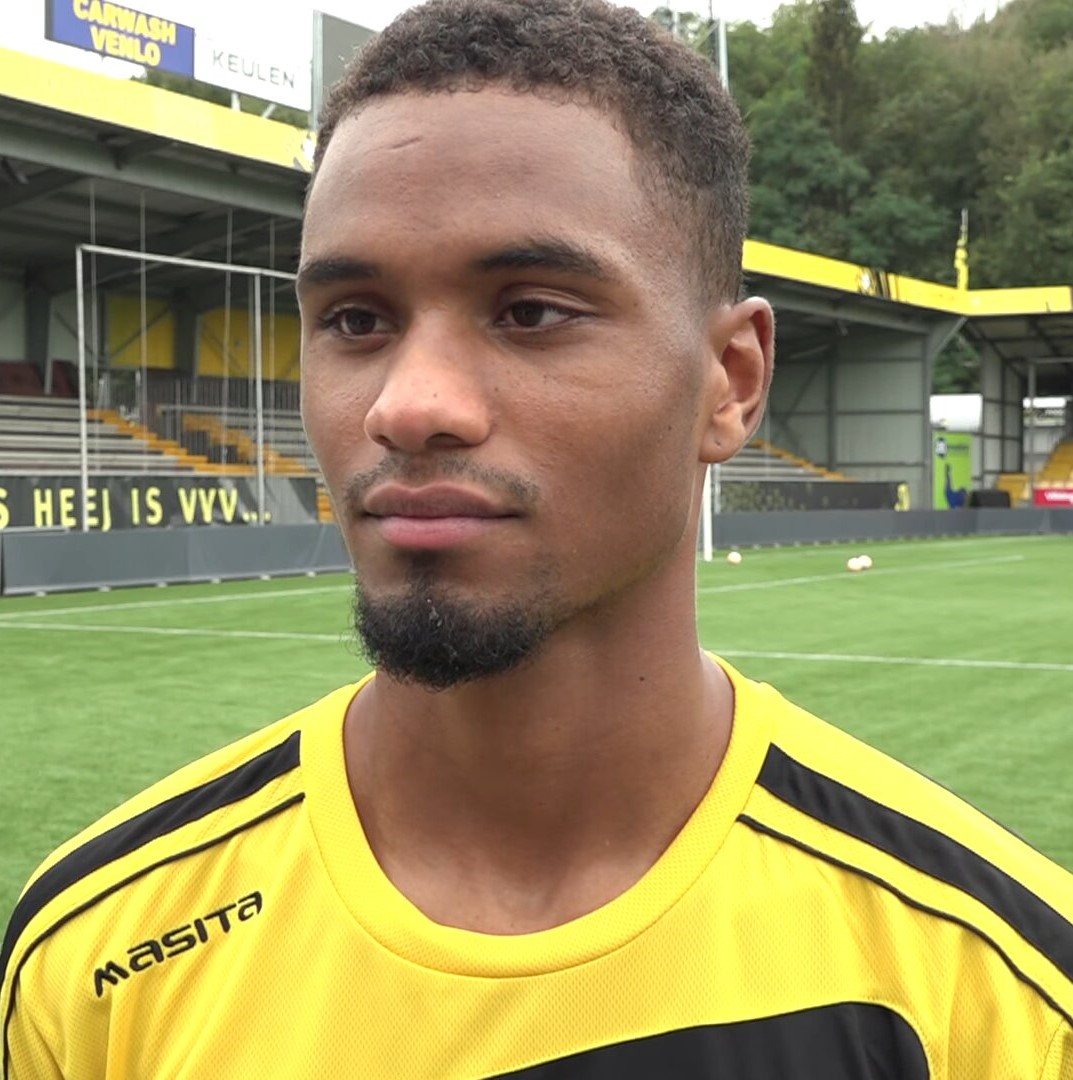
- Joosten in 2018

Personal information
- Date of birth: 14 April 1996 (age 30)
- Place of birth: Nijmegen, Netherlands
- Height: 1.83 m (6 ft 0 in)
- Position: Winger

Youth career
- –2007: SV Orion
- 2007–2014: NEC

Senior career*
| Years | Team | Apps | (Gls) |
| 2014–2015 | NEC | 3 | (0) |
| 2015–2020 | Utrecht | 32 | (2) |
| 2016–2018 | Jong Utrecht | 14 | (2) |
| 2018–2019 | → VVV-Venlo | 30 | (6) |
| 2020 | → Sparta Rotterdam | 8 | (3) |
| 2020–2022 | Groningen | 35 | (3) |
| 2022 | → Cambuur | 15 | (2) |
| 2022 | Apollon Limassol | 12 | (0) |
| 2023–2025 | Willem II | 36 | (1) |

International career
| 2016 | Netherlands U20 | 4 | (1) |
| 2016 | Netherlands U21 | 2 | (0) |
- * Club domestic league appearances and goals as of 12 May 2025

Patrick Joosten (born 14 April 1996) is a Dutch professional footballer who plays as a winger. He has also represented the Netherlands at under-21 level.

== Club career ==
On 31 December 2019, Sparta Rotterdam announced Joosten would be joining them on loan from FC Utrecht for the rest of the season.

On 6 August 2020, Joosten signed a three-year contract with Groningen.

On 11 January 2022, Joosten was loaned to Cambuur for the rest of the season.

On 31 July 2023, Joosten signed a two-year contract with Willem II.

== Honours ==
Individual

- Eredivisie Player of the Month: January 2019
