= Gregoor van Dijk =

Dutch footballer

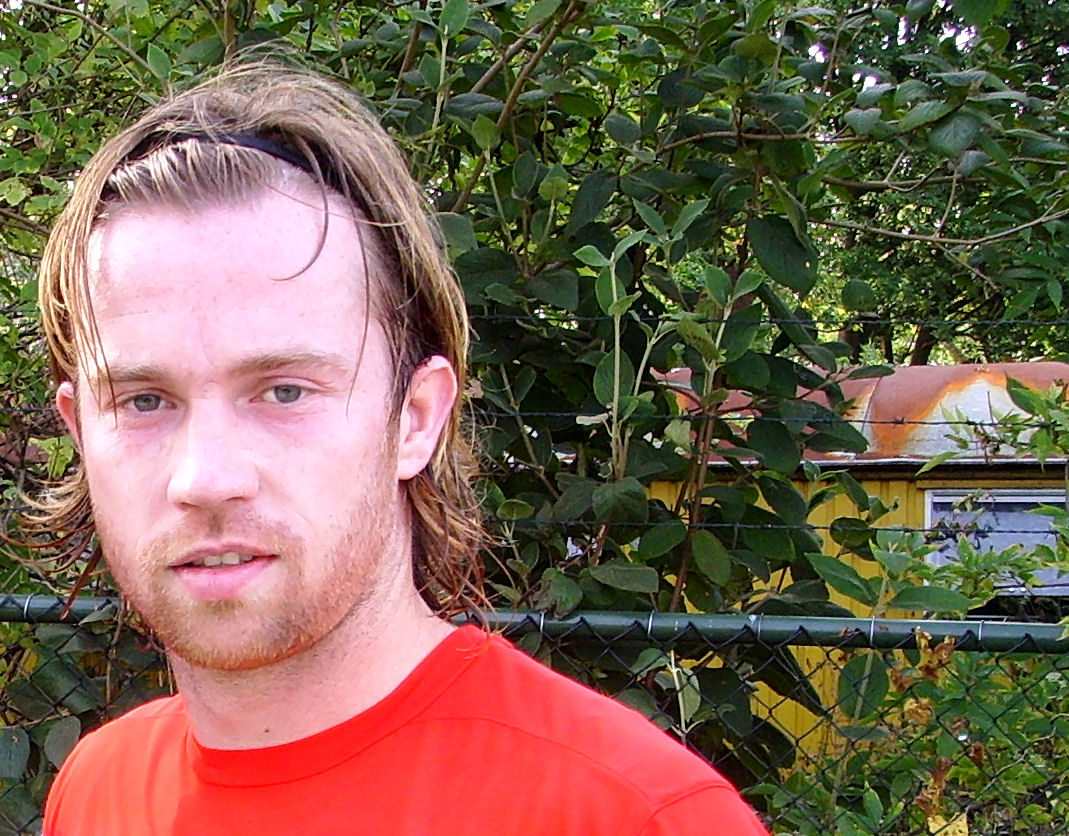

Personal information
- Full name: Gregoor van Dijk
- Date of birth: November 16, 1981 (age 44)
- Place of birth: Groningen, Netherlands
- Height: 1.79 m (5 ft 10 1/2 in)
- Position: Midfielder

Youth career
- LTC Assen
- Groningen

Senior career*
Years	Team	Apps	(Gls)
1998–2001	Groningen	61	(8)
2001–2006	Roda JC	130	(10)
2006–2010	Utrecht	102	(17)
2010–2013	AEK Larnaca	75	(11)
Total		368	(46)

International career
1999-2000	Netherlands U19	4	(0)
- * Club domestic league appearances and goals as of 22 December 2013

Gregoor van Dijk (born 16 November 1981) is a Dutch retired footballer who played as a midfielder.

== Club career ==
Born in Groningen, Van Dijk played for FC Groningen (1998–2000) and Roda JC (2000–2006) before moving to FC Utrecht in the summer of 2006. He signed in July 2010 for Cypriot club AEK Larnaca. A tough-tackling midfielder, Van Dijk received a record 7th red card when skippering Utrecht against De Graafschap in April 2008. His record was equaled by SC Heerenveen midfielder Joey van den Berg in March 2016.

Now he is coach of Initiates of MTBA in Portugal and Padbol player and promoter.

== International career ==
Van Dijk played 4 games for the Netherlands national under-19 football team

== Personal life ==
He is the son of former footballer and coach Jan van Dijk. His brother Dominique also played professional football.
