= Derby of the North =

Football rivalry between SC Heerenveen and FC Groningen

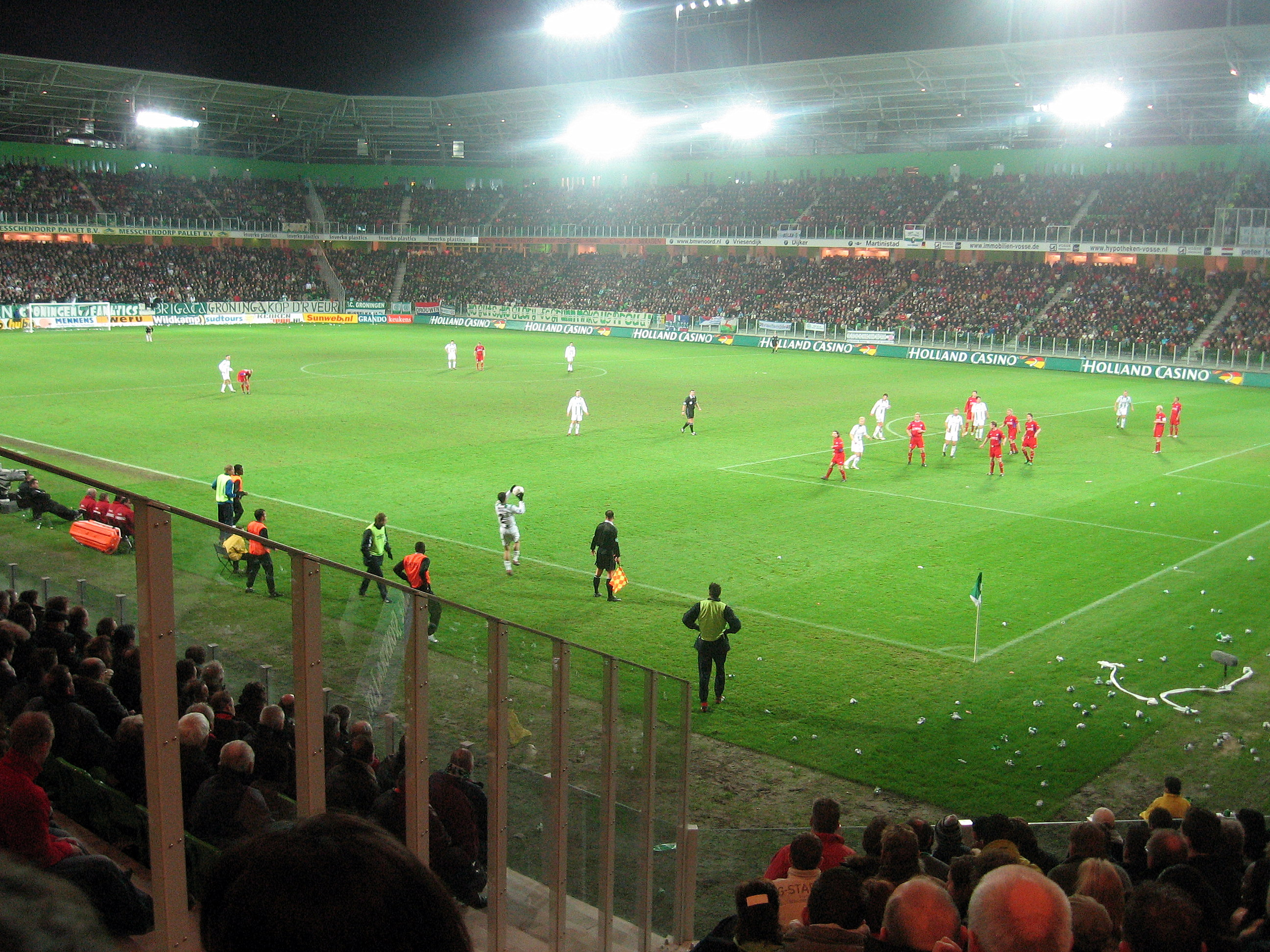
- Groningen v Heerenveen, February 2007
- Native name: Derby van het Noorden
- Location: Northern Netherlands: Groningen and Friesland
- Teams: FC Groningen; SC Heerenveen
- First meeting: Heerenveen 4–1 Groningen; 1974–75 Eerste Divisie (17 November 1974)
- Latest meeting: Heerenveen 0–2 Groningen; 2025–26 Eredivisie (18 January 2026)
- Next meeting: TBD

Statistics
- Most wins: Heerenveen (32)
- Largest victory: Groningen 5–0 Heerenveen; 1979–80 Eerste Divisie (11 November 1979)

The Derby of the North (Dutch: Derby van het Noorden; West Frisian: Derby fan it Noarden) is a match between the Dutch football clubs FC Groningen and SC Heerenveen. Since the dissolution of SC Veendam in 2013, there are only four professional football clubs in the three northern provinces of the Netherlands (Groningen, Friesland and Drenthe): FC Groningen, SC Heerenveen (Friesland), SC Cambuur (Friesland) and FC Emmen (Drenthe). Although Heerenveen have an older and fiercer rivalry with Cambuur, the only game referred to as the Derby of the North is Groningen versus Heerenveen. This is due to Groningen and Heerenveen being seen as representing the provinces of Groningen and Friesland, whereas Cambuur is only regarded as the team of the city of Leeuwarden.

Groningen and Heerenveen have the biggest following of the four northern teams and are regulars in the first-tier Eredivisie. Cambuur have played in the Eerste Divisie, the second tier, for most of their existence. Emmen, Drenthe's only professional football team, made their debut in the Eredivisie in 2018–19. FC Groningen draws a lot of support from the provinces of Groningen and Drenthe.

== History ==
Although FC Groningen and SC Heerenveen played each other for the first time in 1974, the rivalry did not commence until the mid-1990s. In the 1970s and 1980s, Groningen were the biggest and most successful football team in the northern provinces. They were a regular in the first-tier Eredivisie, qualified several times for European football, beat Atlético Madrid and Inter Milan in the UEFA Cup, and had the largest attendances in the Netherlands besides Ajax, Feyenoord and PSV. Only SC Veendam joined FC Groningen in the Eredivisie in two discontinuous seasons the 1980s, but went straight back down on both occasions. Heerenveen would not play in the Eredivisie until 1990–91; during that season, Groningen competed for the league title, ultimately finishing in third place. As Groningen had been the only Northern representative in the top flight, the Dutch media referred to the club as the "Pride of the North". Groningen's club anthem, written in the 1970s, mentions the people from the three northern provinces Groningen, Friesland and Drenthe being united in their support for Groningen.

During the early 1990s, however, Groningen began to decline and were relegated from the Eredivisie in 1997–98. Heerenveen won promotion to the Eredivisie in 1992–93 and started to climb up the Eredivisie table in the following years. The side finished second in the 1999–2000 Eredivisie and qualified for the Champions League. Groningen won promotion back to the top tier the same season.

Heerenveen, under the guidance of chairman Riemer van der Velde, were referred by the Dutch media as a "family club", embracing its Frisian identity; Heerenveen have modelled their kit after the Frisian flag and play the Frisian provincial anthem before every home match. In the early 2000s, the Dutch media referred to Heerenveen as "everybody's second favorite team". During the same era, Groningen's supporters clashed several times with fans of other clubs. Heerenveen began to brand itself as the "Pride of the North", which is Groningen's nickname, as the club had surpassed Groningen in domestic performance. The rivalry intensified, particularly from Groningen's side, whose supporters named themselves the "people's club" with a passionate following, while they regarded Heerenveen fans as "fairweather supporters" with the worst atmosphere in the league.

In early 2006, Groningen left their outdated Oosterparkstadion for Euroborg. In their new stadium, Groningen began to close the gap and climbed up the league table. Around the same time, Heerenveen's "friendly image" began to attenuate.

== List of results ==
Heerenveen have won the derby 32 times and Groningen have been victorious on 21 occasions. From a Groningen perspective it can be argued that the record balances in Heerenveen's favour because the two sides did not meet during Groningen's heyday in the 1980s, due to Heerenveen being in the second tier Eerste Divisie.

Both Groningen and Heerenveen celebrated the opening of their current stadium with a 2–0 victory. Heerenveen did so in the Abe Lenstra Stadion on 26 August 1994; Groningen played their first official match in the Euroborg against Heerenveen on 13 January 2006. Groningen and Heerenveen have never met in the KNVB Cup or in the play-offs.

FC Groningen win
sc Heerenveen win
Draw

Date	League	Venue	Result	Goal scorers FC Groningen	Goal scorers sc Heerenveen	Attendance	Notes
17 Nov 1974	Eerste Divisie	Sportpark Noord	4 – 1	Bloemberg	Zimic 2', Golijanin 23', Toornstra 66' (pen.), Wierts 76'	10,000	
20 Apr 1975	Eerste Divisie	Oosterpark Stadion	2 – 0	Gritter, Hovenkamp		13,000	
2 Nov 1975	Eerste Divisie	Oosterpark Stadion	3 – 0	Hoekstra, Molendijk, Van der Heide		6,000	
16 May 1976	Eerste Divisie	Sportpark Noord	1 – 1	Oosterwold		2,500	
3 Sep 1976	Eerste Divisie	Oosterpark Stadion	1 – 0	Bakker		5,000	
3 Apr 1977	Eerste Divisie	Sportpark Noord	1 – 1	J. van Dijk		3,000	
21 Aug 1977	Eerste Divisie	Sportpark Noord	2 – 0			6,500	
29 Jan 1978	Eerste Divisie	Oosterpark Stadion	1 – 2	Oosterwold		8,500	
12 Nov 1978	Eerste Divisie	Sportpark Noord	0 – 1	Bakker		2,500	
20 May 1979	Eerste Divisie	Oosterpark Stadion	1 – 1	Swanenburg		7,000	
11 Nov 1979	Eerste Divisie	Oosterpark Stadion	5 – 0	Houtman 13', 46', 67', 90', Mulder		7,000	
27 Apr 1980	Eerste Divisie	Sportpark Noord	0 – 2	Houtman (2)		11,000	
27 Jan 1991	Eredivisie	Oosterpark Stadion	3 – 0	Veenhof 1', Huizingh 20', Djurovski 85'		15,000	
16 Jun 1991	Eredivisie	Sportpark Noord	4 – 2	Huizingh 26', Djurovski 31'	Cămătaru 52', Van der Gijp 62', 88', Dijk 86'	12,312	The last match of a season in which Groningen had competed for the league title, while Heerenveen was fighting against relegation. It is widely believed that in these pre-rivalry days, Groningen allowed Heerenveen to grab the victory in order to have a chance of survival. It was to no avail as Heerenveen fell one goal short to stay up.
31 Oct 1993	Eredivisie	Oosterpark Stadion	2 – 2	Ter Avest 40', Hamming 48'	Tammer 82', Alberda 86'	14,100	
5 Apr 1994	Eredivisie	Sportpark Noord	2 – 0		Hellinga 9', Tammer 52'	13,500	
26 Aug 1994	Eredivisie	Abe Lenstra Stadion	2 – 0		Sier 41', Regtop 71'	13,200	The first match in Abe Lenstra Stadion
15 Jan 1995	Eredivisie	Oosterpark Stadion	0 – 0			15,010	
29 Aug 1995	Eredivisie	Abe Lenstra Stadion	1 – 0		Straal 88'	13,300	
12 Mar 1996	Eredivisie	Oosterpark Stadion	1 – 1	Bombarda 57'	Tomasson 64'	13,500	
6 Sep 1996	Eredivisie	Oosterpark Stadion	1 – 5	Gorré 83'	Hansma 33', Wouden 48', 60', Tomasson 54', Talan 69'	12,320	
1 Jun 1997	Eredivisie	Abe Lenstra Stadion	1 – 3	Magno 16', 28', Gorré 64'	Nygaard 49'	13,500	
2 Dec 1997	Eredivisie	Oosterpark Stadion	0 – 1		Elkhattabi 73'	15,000	
8 Apr 1998	Eredivisie	Abe Lenstra Stadion	1 – 1	Magno 41'	Van Nistelrooy 73'	13,700	
21 Dec 2000	Eredivisie	Oosterpark Stadion	2 – 1	Hugo 34', G. van Dijk 80' (pen.)	De Nooijer 15'	13,000	
2 Mar 2001	Eredivisie	Oosterpark Stadion	0 – 0			14,350	
21 Oct 2001	Eredivisie	Oosterpark Stadion	1 – 1	Boussaboun 38'	Nurmela 32'	13,000	
24 Apr 2002	Eredivisie	Abe Lenstra Stadion	2 – 0		Hakansson 48', 69'	14,400	
1 Dec 2002	Eredivisie	Oosterpark Stadion	1 – 1	Salmon 60'	Samaras 79'	12,500	
9 May 2003	Eredivisie	Abe Lenstra Stadion	2 – 1	Salmon 72'	Sibon 45', J. De Jong 89'	14,400	
13 Sep 2003	Eredivisie	Abe Lenstra Stadion	1 – 0		Hansson 38'	14,600	
19 Mar 2004	Eredivisie	Oosterpark Stadion	0 – 0			12,500	
10 Dec 2004	Eredivisie	Abe Lenstra Stadion	1 – 0		Väyrynen 66'	17,863	
15 May 2005	Eredivisie	Oosterpark Stadion	1 – 2	Buijs 75'	Berg Hestad 27', Nilsson 60'	12,500	
6 Nov 2005	Eredivisie	Abe Lenstra Stadion	4 – 0		Huntelaar 5', 47', Bosvelt 43', Samaras 74'	21,200	
13 Jan 2006	Eredivisie	Euroborg	2 – 0	Nevland 24', Buijs 53'		19,710	The first official match in Euroborg
22 Oct 2006	Eredivisie	Abe Lenstra Stadion	4 – 2	Levchenko 81', 82'	Alves 14', 74', 79', Friend 67'	26,000	
2 Feb 2007	Eredivisie	Euroborg	1 – 1	Van der Linden 62'	Alves 70'	19,846	
9 Dec 2007	Eredivisie	Abe Lenstra Stadion	4 – 2	Nevland 9', 14'	Lovre 2' (o.g.), Bradley 7', 22', 41'	25,600	
14 Mar 2008	Eredivisie	Euroborg	0 – 1		Sulejmani 86'	19,719	
28 Dec 2008	Eredivisie	Euroborg	2 – 3	García García 54', Granqvist 90'	Pranjić 13' (pen.), Smárason 77', Paulo Henrique 90+5'	22,311	
7 Mar 2009	Eredivisie	Abe Lenstra Stadion	2 – 1	Holla 68'	Grindheim 59', Elm 90+3'	26,100	Record attendance for the derby game
12 Sep 2009	Eredivisie	Abe Lenstra Stadion	0 – 1	Nordstrand 61'		26,100	
20 Jan 2010	Eredivisie	Euroborg	2 – 0	Matavž 13', Granqvist 59'		22,440	
17 Oct 2010	Eredivisie	Euroborg	1 – 0	Granqvist 46'		22,427	
30 Jan 2011	Eredivisie	Abe Lenstra Stadion	1 – 4	Ivens 13', Matavž 25', Tadić 56', 90+4'	Đuričić 68'	26,100	
11 Sep 2011	Eredivisie	Abe Lenstra Stadion	3 – 0		Dost 45+1', Assaidi 61', Đuričić 84'	26,100	
31 Mar 2012	Eredivisie	Euroborg	1 – 3	Tadić 36'	Dost 24', 41', Elm 86'	22,423	
21 Oct 2012	Eredivisie	Abe Lenstra Stadion	3 – 0		Van la Parra 61', 83', Finnbogason 65'	26,100	
7 Apr 2013	Eredivisie	Euroborg	3 – 1	Raitala 3' (o.g.), Bacuna 42' (pen.), De Leeuw 87'	Mareček 70'	22,505	
15 Sep 2013	Eredivisie	Abe Lenstra Stadion	4 – 2	Van der Velden 31' (pen.), Kappelhof 56'	Wildschut 52', Otigba 55', Finnbogason 72' (pen.), 90'	24,150	
9 Feb 2013	Eredivisie	Euroborg	1 – 3	De Leeuw 86' (pen.)	Van La Parra 33', Ziyech 36', Finnbogason 40' (pen.)	20,193	
7 Dec 2014	Eredivisie	Euroborg	1 – 1	De Leeuw 7'	Uth 25'	20,705	
22 Feb 2015	Eredivisie	Abe Lenstra Stadion	3 – 1	De Leeuw 50'	Thern 35', Van Aken 59', Veerman 90+2'	24,894	
13 Sep 2015	Eredivisie	Euroborg	3 – 1	Hoesen 1', Linssen 16', Mahi 82'	Thern 69'	21,001	
1 May 2016	Eredivisie	Abe Lenstra Stadion	1 – 2	Idrissi 26', Rusnák 52'	Larsson 21'	25,385	
15 October 2016	Eredivisie	Euroborg	0 – 3		Zeneli 7', Larsson 73', Ghoochannejhad 82'	21,155	
29 January 2017	Eredivisie	Abe Lenstra Stadion	0 – 0			21,750	
13 August 2017	Eredivisie	Euroborg	3 – 3	Veldwijk 53', Mahi 82' (pen.), 88' (pen.)	Thorsby 6', 86', Ghoochannejhad 40'	19,422	
8 April 2018	Eredivisie	Abe Lenstra Stadion	1 – 1	Van Weert 55'	Vlap 31'	23,150	
11 November 2018	Eredivisie	Euroborg	2 – 0	Warmerdam 27', Doan 38'		20,731	
14 April 2019	Eredivisie	Abe Lenstra Stadion	1 – 1	Gladon 61'	Van Amersfoort 38'	21,056	
27 October 2019	Eredivisie	Abe Lenstra Stadion	1 – 1	Benschop 73' (pen.)	Faik 45+3' (pen.)	22,428	
20 April 2020	Eredivisie	Euroborg					The game, and the 2019–20 Eredivisie season, were abandoned due to the COVID-19 pandemic in the Netherlands.
21 February 2021	Eredivisie	Abe Lenstra Stadion	1 – 1	Suslov 82'	S. De Jong 43'	0	
11 April 2021	Eredivisie	Euroborg	0 – 2		Veerman 71' (pen.), Halilović 86'	0	
12 September 2021	Eredivisie	Euroborg	1 – 1	Ngonge 68'	Halilović 19'	15,000	
10 April 2022	Eredivisie	Abe Lenstra Stadion	3 – 1	Kasanwirjo 29'	Van Hooijdonk 7', 53', Van Beek 80'	22,500	
22 January 2023	Eredivisie	Abe Lenstra Stadion	3 – 1	Krüger 40'	Sarr 5', 82', Van Amersfoort 81'	19,029	
19 March 2023	Eredivisie	Euroborg	0 – 2		Van Hooijdonk 27', 40'	21,247	
22 September 2024	Eredivisie	Abe Lenstra Stadion	2 – 1	Valente 9'	Trenskow 12', Nicolaescu 69'	23,729	
25 January 2025	Eredivisie	Euroborg	1 – 0	Valente 63'		22,525	
16 August 2025	Eredivisie	Euroborg	2 – 1	Willumsson 29', 90+4'	Trenskow 15'	22,525	
18 January 2026	Eredivisie	Abe Lenstra Stadion	0 – 2	Klaverboer (o.g.) 58', Blokzijl 79'		24,105	
