= Mohammed Allach =

Dutch football player and sporting director

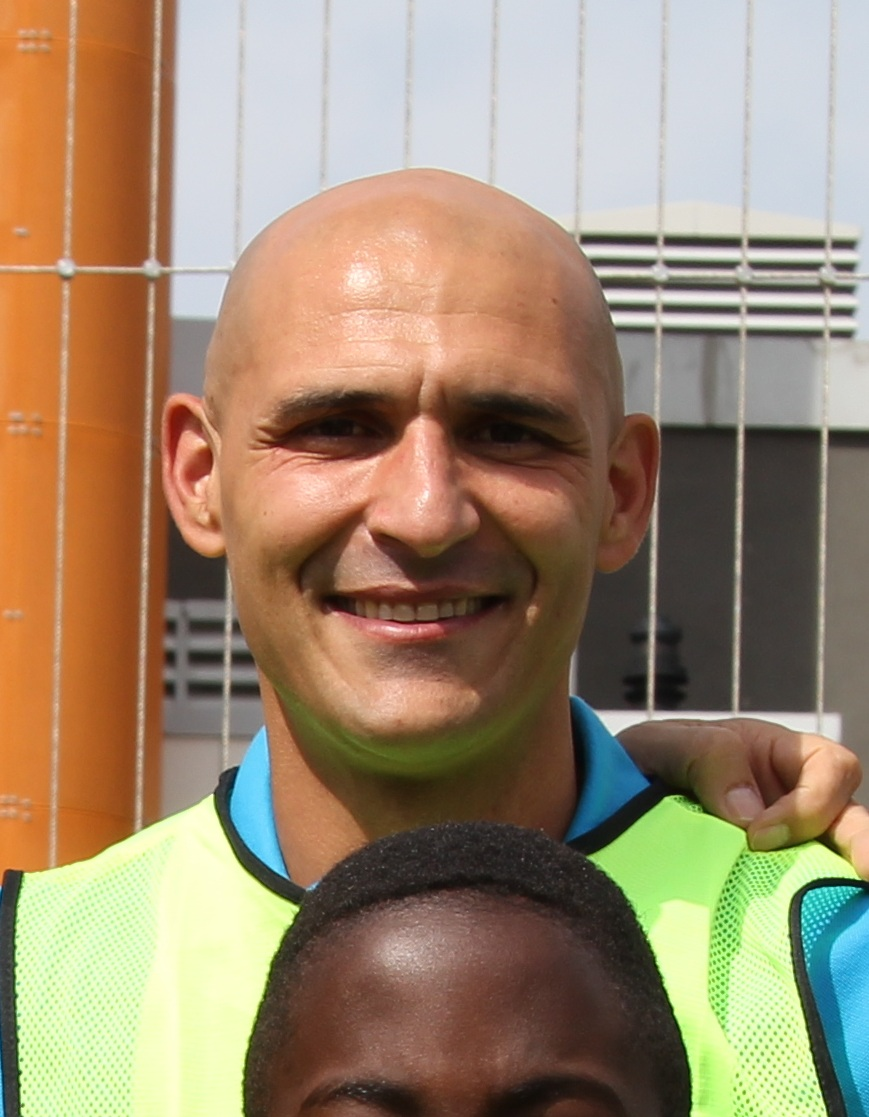
- Allach in 2012

Personal information
- Full name: Mohammed Allach
- Date of birth: 20 September 1973 (age 53)
- Place of birth: The Hague, Netherlands
- Height: 1.80 m (5 ft 11 in)
- Position: Defender

Team information
- Current team: RKC Waalwijk (technical director)

Youth career
- DWO
- 1994–1996: Alphense Boys

Senior career*
Years	Team	Apps	(Gls)
1996–2000	Excelsior	80	(1)
2000	Feyenoord	0	(0)
2000–2002	Groningen	69	(1)
2002–2003	Dordrecht	22	(0)
2003–2004	Twente	12	(0)
2004–2006	VVV-Venlo	64	(0)
Total		247	(2)
- * Club domestic league appearances and goals

Mohammed "Mo" Allach (born 20 September 1973) is a Dutch football executive and former player. He serves as the technical director of Groningen.

== Playing career ==
Allach studied social pedagogy after high school. He started his professional career at a relatively late age. He was a youth worker in Gouda, South Holland and played at amateur level with DWO in Zoetermeer and Alphense Boys when he was recruited in 1996 by the second-tier Eerste Divisie club Excelsior. Halfway through the 1999–2000 season, Allach moved to top-tier side Feyenoord, where he did not make an official appearance. In 2000, he left for Groningen, where he was a regular starter for more than two seasons. In 2002, he was forced to leave there after a conflict with head coach Dwight Lodeweges, who called him a "source of friction" in the squad.

Allach then played for Dordrecht in the Eerste Divisie and Twente in the Eredivisie. When he was unable to enforce a regular starting spot at the last club, he left for VVV-Venlo in 2004. In 2006, he retired from professional football and then started working as technical director and head of practice at VVV.

== Executive career ==
=== Twente and RKC ===
In 2008, Allach moved from the role as technical director and head youth academy of VVV to Twente, where he became director of football. After one season at Twente, he became director of football affairs at RKC Waalwijk.

=== KNVB ===
In 2011, Allach moved into a position as technical manager for the Royal Dutch Football Association (KNVB). Under Allach's period as technical manager, the Netherlands national football team, led by Bert van Marwijk, easily qualified for the UEFA Euro 2012, where the team subsequently went winless in the group stage and were therefore immediately eliminated. On 6 June 2012, the Netherlands were in fourth place in the FIFA World Rankings, only behind Germany, Uruguay and Spain.

=== Vitesse ===
In July 2013, Vitesse announced that they had contracted Allach as technical director. He succeeded Ted van Leeuwen. Allach held that position until 2017. During this period, Vitesse won the KNVB Cup, the first silverware in club history. After a short stint with Israeli club Maccabi Haifa, Allach returned to Vitesse in March 2019. Allach left the club nine months later after a conflict with club management.

=== Return to RKC ===
On 10 June 2020, RKC Waalwijk announced that Allach would become the new technical director; his second period with the club.

== Political career ==
In late 2003, Allach and friends founded the Maroquistars Foundation, a volunteer organisation that aims at strengthening young people in terms of social resilience through social projects.

Allach is a member of the Labour Party (PvdA). For the 2006 Dutch general election, he was asked by leader of the party Wouter Bos to run under the PvdA candidate list, but he declined this. For the 2012 Dutch general election, Allach was the PvdA's Lijstduwer. He was in 73rd place, just ahead of Maarten van Rossem.
