= 1999–2000 KNVB Cup =

Tournament details
- Country: Netherlands
- Teams: 86

Final positions
- Champions: Roda JC
- Runners-up: NEC

Tournament statistics
- Top goal scorer(s): Bert Zuurman; Eric Viscaal; Rick Hoogendorp (8 goals)

The 1999–2000 KNVB Cup (at the time known as the Amstel Cup for sponsorship reasons) was the 82nd edition of the Dutch national football annual knockout tournament for the KNVB Cup. 86 teams contested, beginning on 31 July 1999 and at the final on 21 May 2000.

Ajax unsuccessfully defended its 1999 title in the Round of 16 losing to Roda JC, 1–0. Roda JC successfully pursued on 21 May 2000 in De Kuip, Rotterdam its 2nd KNVB Cup losing to NEC, 0–2. 40,000 attended. Roda JC contested the UEFA Cup.

== Teams ==
- All 18 participants of the Eredivisie 1999–2000: six teams entered in the round of 16 of the knock-out stage; one team entered in the first round of the knock-out stage and the rest of the teams entered in the group stage.
- All 18 participants of the Eerste Divisie 1999–2000
- 48 teams from lower (amateur) leagues
- Two youth teams

== Group stage ==
The matches were played between 31 July and 31 August 1999. 79 clubs participated, 39 of which advanced to the next round.

Group 1
Team	Pts
1. Fortuna Sittard _{E}	9
2. FC Eindhoven _{1}	6
3. OJC Rosmalen _{A}	3
4. BVV Barendrecht _{A}	0

Group 2
Team	Pts
1. De Graafschap _{E}	9
2. KVV Quick '20 _{A}	4
3. IJsselmeervogels _{A}	2
4. RKSV Babberich _{A}	1

Group 3
Team	Pts
1. FC Groningen _{1}	9
2. Heracles Almelo _{1}	6
3. VV Appingedam _{A}	3
4. DVS '33 _{A}	0

Group 4
Team	Pts
1. MVV _{E}	9
2. VV Eijsden _{A}	4
3. SV Panningen _{A}	3
4. SV Meerssen _{A}	1

Group 5
Team	Pts
1. NEC _{E}	9
2. VV Be Quick '28 _{A}	6
3. VVOG _{A}	3
4. HSC '21 _{A}	0

Group 6
Team	Pts
1. RKC Waalwijk _{E}	9
2. HSV Hoek _{A}	4
3. RKSV Halsteren _{A}	2
4. RKSV Leonidas _{A}	1

Group 7
Team	Pts
1. ADO Den Haag _{1}	9
2. Sparta _{E}	6
3. VSV TONEGIDO _{A}	1
4. ARC _{A}	1

Group 8
Team	Pts
1. FC Utrecht _{E}	9
2. SV Spakenburg _{A}	6
3. SV Argon _{A}	3
4. USV Elinkwijk _{A}	0

Group 9
Team	Pts
1. FC Volendam _{1}	4
2. Telstar _{1}	4
3. HVV Hollandia _{A}	0
SC Genemuiden _{A}	DSQ

Group 10
Team	Pts
1. AZ _{E}	9
2. VV Noordwijk _{A}	6
3. FC Hilversum _{A}	1
4. ADO '20 _{A}	1

Group 11
Team	Pts
1. RBC Roosendaal _{1}	7
2. FC Den Bosch _{E}	5
3. RKSV UDI '19 _{A}	2
4. GVVV _{A}	1

Group 12
Team	Pts
1. NAC Breda _{1}	9
2. VV Baronie _{A}	6
3. TOP Oss _{1}	3
4. VV Kloetinge _{A}	0

Group 13
Team	Pts
1. Excelsior Maassluis _{A}	5
2. Dordrecht'90 _{1}	5
3. Türkiyemspor _{A}	5
4. Kozakken Boys _{A}	0

Group 14
Team	Pts
1. HFC Haarlem _{1}	7
2. AFC '34 _{A}	4
3. FC Lisse _{A}	2
4. Rijnsburgse Boys _{A}	2

Group 15
Team	Pts
1. Veendam _{1}	9
2. FC Emmen _{1}	6
3. Harkemase Boys _{A}	3
4. VV Sneek _{A}	0

Group 16
Team	Pts
1. Excelsior _{1}	9
2. SVV Scheveningen _{A}	6
3. Young ADO Den Haag	3
4. VVSB _{A}	0

Group 17
Team	Pts
1. Go Ahead Eagles _{1}	9
2. AGOVV Apeldoorn _{A}	4
3. Young De Graafschap	3
4. VV Bennekom _{A}	1

Group 18
Team	Pts
1. Helmond Sport _{1}	6
2. VV Gemert _{A}	4
3. VV DOVO _{A}	4
4. VVV-Venlo _{1}	2

Group 19
Team	Pts
1. Cambuur Leeuw. _{E}	7
2. FC Zwolle _{1}	6
3. Achilles 1894 _{A}	4
4. Flevo Boys _{A}	0

Group 20
Team	Pts
1. FC Twente _{E}	6
2. SV Urk _{A}	3
3. Sporting Flevoland _{A}	0

_{E} Eredivisie; _{1} Eerste Divisie; _{A} Amateur teams

== Knock-out Stage ==
=== First round ===
The matches of the first round were played on September 22 and 23, 1999. sc Heerenveen entered the tournament this round, during the group stage they were still active in the Intertoto Cup.

Home team	Result	Away team
Excelsior	2–1	FC Emmen
FC Eindhoven	2–1	NAC Breda
HSV Hoek	0–4	AZ
NEC	3–0	SV Spakenburg
RKC Waalwijk	2–0	Telstar
Cambuur Leeuwarden	0–1	FC Zwolle
Be Quick '28	2–0	Excelsior Maassluis (on 5 October)
Fortuna Sittard	2–0	VV Noordwijk (on 5 October)
sc Heerenveen _{E}	2–0	De Graafschap (on 5 October)
FC Twente	2–1	VV Gemert (on 6 October)

Home team	Result	Away team
FC Utrecht	2–0	FC Den Bosch
Go Ahead Eagles	3–1	SVV Scheveningen
Heracles Almelo	3–0	FC Volendam
VV Eijsden	1–8	Helmond Sport
KVV Quick '20	1–2	RBC Roosendaal
Dordrecht'90	5–0	FC Groningen
HFC Haarlem	3–1	AGOVV Apeldoorn
ADO Den Haag	3–0	AFC '34
Veendam	3–0	Sparta
MVV	2–3 (aet)	VV Baronie

_{E} one Eredivisie entrant

=== Second round ===
The matches of the second round were played on October 28 and 30, 1999.

Home team	Result	Away team
Helmond Sport	12–1	Be Quick '28
FC Eindhoven	4–2	FC Zwolle
Excelsior	3–2	Fortuna Sittard
Dordrecht'90	2–1 (gg)	HFC Haarlem
Go Ahead Eagles	2–1	VV Baronie
AZ	2–0	Heracles Almelo
RBC Roosendaal	2–0	Veendam
ADO Den Haag	1–3	FC Utrecht
sc Heerenveen	1–2	NEC
RKC Waalwijk	2–0	FC Twente

=== Round of 16 ===
The matches of the round of 16 were played on January 27, 28 and 30, 2000. The Eredivisie teams that had been playing in European competitions after qualification last season, entered the tournament this round.

Home team	Result	Away team
RKC Waalwijk	2–0	FC Eindhoven
Helmond Sport	1–2	Willem II _{E}
Roda JC _{E}	1–0	Ajax _{E}
NEC	1–0	Excelsior
Dordrecht'90	1–0	RBC Roosendaal
PSV _{E}	0–2	Vitesse Arnhem _{E}
FC Utrecht	5–3	Go Ahead Eagles
Feyenoord _{E}	1–3	AZ

_{E} six Eredivisie entrants

=== Quarter finals ===
The quarter finals were played on February 16 and 17, 2000.

Home team	Result	Away team
NEC	2–0	Dordrecht'90
FC Utrecht	0–1	Roda JC
RKC Waalwijk	0–1	Vitesse Arnhem
Willem II	1–2 (gg)	AZ

=== Semi-finals ===
The semi-finals were played on April 11 and 12, 2000.

Home team	Result	Away team
AZ	1–1 (p: 1-4)	NEC
Vitesse Arnhem	0–1 (gg)	Roda JC

=== Final ===
21 May 2000
18:00 CEST

NEC	0–2	Roda JC
	Report	Peeters 20'; Van der Luer 90' (pen.)

De Kuip, Rotterdam
Attendance: 40,000
Referee: Roelof Luinge

Roda JC would play in the UEFA Cup.
