= 1999–2000 Eredivisie =

44th season of the Eredivisie

Eredivisie
- Season: 1999–2000
- Dates: 12 August 1999 – 14 May 2000
- Champions: PSV (15th title)
- Promoted: FC Den Bosch
- Relegated: MVV; Cambuur Leeuw. FC Den Bosch
- Champions League: PSV sc Heerenveen; Feyenoord
- UEFA Cup: Vitesse Arnhem; Ajax; Roda JC
- Intertoto Cup: RKC Waalwijk
- Goals: 997
- Average goals/game: 3.25
- Top goalscorer: (Netherlands) Ruud van Nistelrooy (29 goals)

The Dutch Eredivisie in the 1999–2000 season was contested by 18 teams. PSV won the championship.

== League standings ==
Pos	Team	Pld	W	D	L	GF	GA	GD	Pts	Qualification or relegation
1	PSV (C)	34	27	3	4	105	24	+81	84	Qualification to Champions League group stage
2	Heerenveen	34	21	5	8	65	36	+29	68	Qualification to Champions League group stage
3	Feyenoord	34	18	10	6	66	42	+24	64	Qualification to Champions League third qualifying round
4	Vitesse Arnhem	34	18	9	7	67	43	+24	63	Qualification to UEFA Cup first round (Note: Roda JC qualified for the UEFA Cup by winning the 1999–2000 KNVB Cup.)
5	Ajax	34	18	7	9	72	51	+21	61	Qualification to UEFA Cup first round
6	FC Twente	34	16	12	6	57	37	+20	60	
7	AZ	34	17	4	13	69	59	+10	55	
8	Roda JC	34	16	7	11	62	53	+9	55	Qualification to UEFA Cup first round
9	Willem II	34	13	9	12	55	65	−10	48	
10	FC Utrecht	34	14	4	16	55	61	−6	46	
11	RKC Waalwijk	34	12	6	16	44	67	−23	42	Qualification to Intertoto Cup third round
12	Fortuna Sittard	34	10	8	16	47	54	−7	38	
13	Sparta Rotterdam	34	11	4	19	48	75	−27	37	
14	De Graafschap	34	8	9	17	41	60	−19	33	
15	NEC	34	7	6	21	35	62	−27	27	
16	MVV (R)	34	6	7	21	38	68	−30	25	Qualification to Relegation play-offs (Note: MVV and Cambuur both relegated after losing their promotion/relegation play-offs.)
17	Cambuur (R)	34	6	7	21	35	66	−31	25	Qualification to Relegation play-offs
18	Den Bosch (R)	34	4	11	19	36	74	−38	23	Relegation to Eerste Divisie

Rules for classification: 1) Points; 2) Goal difference; 3) Goals scored; 4) Head-to-head points; 5) Head-to-head goal difference; 6) Head-to-head away goals scored; 7) Play-off if relevant for deciding champion, relegation or participating in a European league, otherwise by draw. 8) Penalty shoot-out (only after a play-off)
(C) Champions; (R) Relegated

== Results ==
Home \ Away	AJA	AZ	DEN	CAM	FEY	FOR	GRA	HEE	MVV	NEC	PSV	RKC	ROD	SPA	TWE	UTR	VIT	WIL
Ajax	—	4–1	6–1	3–1	2–2	4–1	2–1	3–2	1–0	5–2	1–3	1–2	1–2	3–2	0–1	2–0	3–1	3–1
AZ	1–2	—	2–0	4–0	0–0	2–0	2–0	0–1	2–0	1–1	0–3	4–0	1–2	4–0	2–1	0–1	0–1	2–2
Den Bosch	1–1	2–3	—	1–1	0–4	0–2	1–1	0–2	1–1	1–1	2–6	0–3	2–2	7–0	0–0	3–2	2–1	1–1
Cambuur	0–3	2–4	1–2	—	2–3	0–0	1–0	0–2	2–2	0–0	0–1	2–1	2–2	0–1	1–3	4–3	1–1	0–1
Feyenoord	1–1		3–0	4–0	—	1–0	0–0	3–1	3–0	2–1	1–0	1–2	2–1	1–2	1–1	1–2	0–0	1–0
Fortuna Sittard	2–0	1–2	1–1	4–1	2–3	—	1–1	0–1	3–1	2–2	0–4	0–2	1–2	3–2	2–2	3–0	3–3	2–0
De Graafschap	1–1	2–5	3–0	3–1	0–1	1–0	—	1–1	2–1	2–2	1–2	2–0	0–0	2–3	0–0	1–2	2–2	0–2
Heerenveen	1–1	3–0	1–1	4–1	3–0	3–0	2–0	—	3–1	1–0	0–3	4–1	5–1	3–1	0–0	1–0	1–3	2–4
MVV	2–6	3–4	2–0	1–1	3–3	1–0	0–2	1–3	—	2–0	0–2	0–1	0–0	2–2	0–2	4–1	0–2	1–1
NEC	1–3	1–2	2–0	1–0	0–2	1–2	2–3	0–4	1–0	—	2–1	3–1	0–0	0–1	0–1	0–1	1–0	2–1
PSV	4–0	5–1	7–0	1–0	0–1	2–1	6–0	0–1	4–1	2–0	—	7–1	2–0	7–0	2–2	2–1	3–2	6–1
RKC	1–1	1–2	1–1	3–2	2–2	0–3	2–1	0–1	0–4	4–2	1–6	—	2–2	2–1	1–1	2–0	1–1	1–0
Roda	3–0	3–2	3–0	3–1	2–1	3–0	2–3	0–2	3–1	4–3	1–2	1–2	—	4–1	3–2	3–2	0–1	3–4
Sparta Rotterdam	1–2	3–6	3–2	1–2	1–3	2–3	2–1	2–1	3–0	1–0	0–2	3–1	1–2	—	1–1	3–0	1–1	0–2
Twente	0–0	4–1	3–2	1–0	3–3	1–0	4–0	2–0	1–2	4–2	1–3	1–0	2–1	3–2	—		0–0	4–0
Utrecht	3–1	3–3	2–1	1–2	3–4	2–1	2–1	2–2	2–0	1–0	1–1	4–1	1–2	3–1	1–0	—	2–0	1–1
Vitesse	3–0	0–2	1–0	1–0	3–3	2–2	3–1	3–1	6–2	5–1	1–6	2–1	2–0	2–1	4–1	3–1	—	3–1
Willem II	3–6	3–1	2–1	1–4	2–1	2–2	5–3	2–3	1–0	3–1	0–0	2–1	2–2	0–0	1–1	4–3	0–4	—

Legend: Blue = home team win; Yellow = draw; Red = away team win.

== Promotion/relegation play-offs ==
In the promotion/relegation competition, eight entrants (six from the Eerste Divisie and two from this league) entered in two groups. The group winners were promoted to (or remained in) the Eredivisie.

Group 1
Pos	Team	Pld	W	D	L	GF	GA	GD	Pts	Promotion or relegation
1	FC Groningen	6	5	1	0	19	7	+12	16	Promotion to Eredivisie
2	FC Emmen	6	2	2	2	8	10	−2	8	
3	MVV	6	2	1	3	11	14	−3	7	Relegation to Eerste Divisie
4	Heracles Almelo	6	1	1	4	10	17	−7	4	

Group 2
Pos	Team	Pld	W	D	L	GF	GA	GD	Pts	Promotion or relegation
1	RBC Roosendaal	6	3	2	1	10	7	+3	11	Promotion to Eredivisie
2	FC Zwolle	6	3	1	2	14	7	+7	10	
3	Excelsior	6	2	1	3	11	14	−3	7	
4	Cambuur Leeuwarden	6	1	2	3	6	13	−7	5	Relegation to Eerste Divisie

== Top scorers ==
Goals	Player	Team
29	(Netherlands) Ruud van Nistelrooy	PSV
25	(Netherlands) Pierre van Hooijdonk	Vitesse Arnhem
19	(Netherlands) Arnold Bruggink	PSV
19	(Belgium) Luc Nilis	PSV
19	(Netherlands) Jan Vennegoor of Hesselink	Twente
18	(Netherlands) John Bosman	AZ
18	(Netherlands) Anthony Lurling	Heerenveen
15	(Argentina) Julio Cruz	Feyenoord
15	(Netherlands) Richard Knopper	Ajax
15	(Belgium) Bob Peeters	Roda JC

Source: worldfootball.net

== Attendances ==
No.	Club	Average	Change	Highest
1	AFC Ajax	39,980	-6,1%	49,500
2	Feyenoord	33,179	3,7%	45,000
3	PSV	28,471	6,0%	29,500
4	SBV Vitesse	25,056	9,6%	26,500
5	Willem II	14,156	16,0%	14,700
6	sc Heerenveen	13,794	0,7%	14,000
7	FC Twente	12,815	6,7%	13,500
8	FC Utrecht	12,788	0,3%	14,000
9	De Graafschap	8,932	12,3%	10,900
10	SC Cambuur	8,129	-3,4%	10,000
11	NEC	8,021	36,5%	11,000
12	Fortuna Sittard	7,979	27,3%	13,000
13	Roda JC Kerkrade	7,532	7,1%	10,000
14	Sparta Rotterdam	7,071	57,6%	11,000
15	AZ	6,929	-11,3%	8,275
16	MVV Maastricht	6,625	5,0%	9,500
17	RKC Waalwijk	5,659	13,0%	7,500
18	FC Den Bosch	4,478	37,6%	7,000

== See also ==
- 1999–2000 Eerste Divisie
- 1999–2000 KNVB Cup
