= Tonny van Leeuwen =

Dutch footballer (1943–1971)

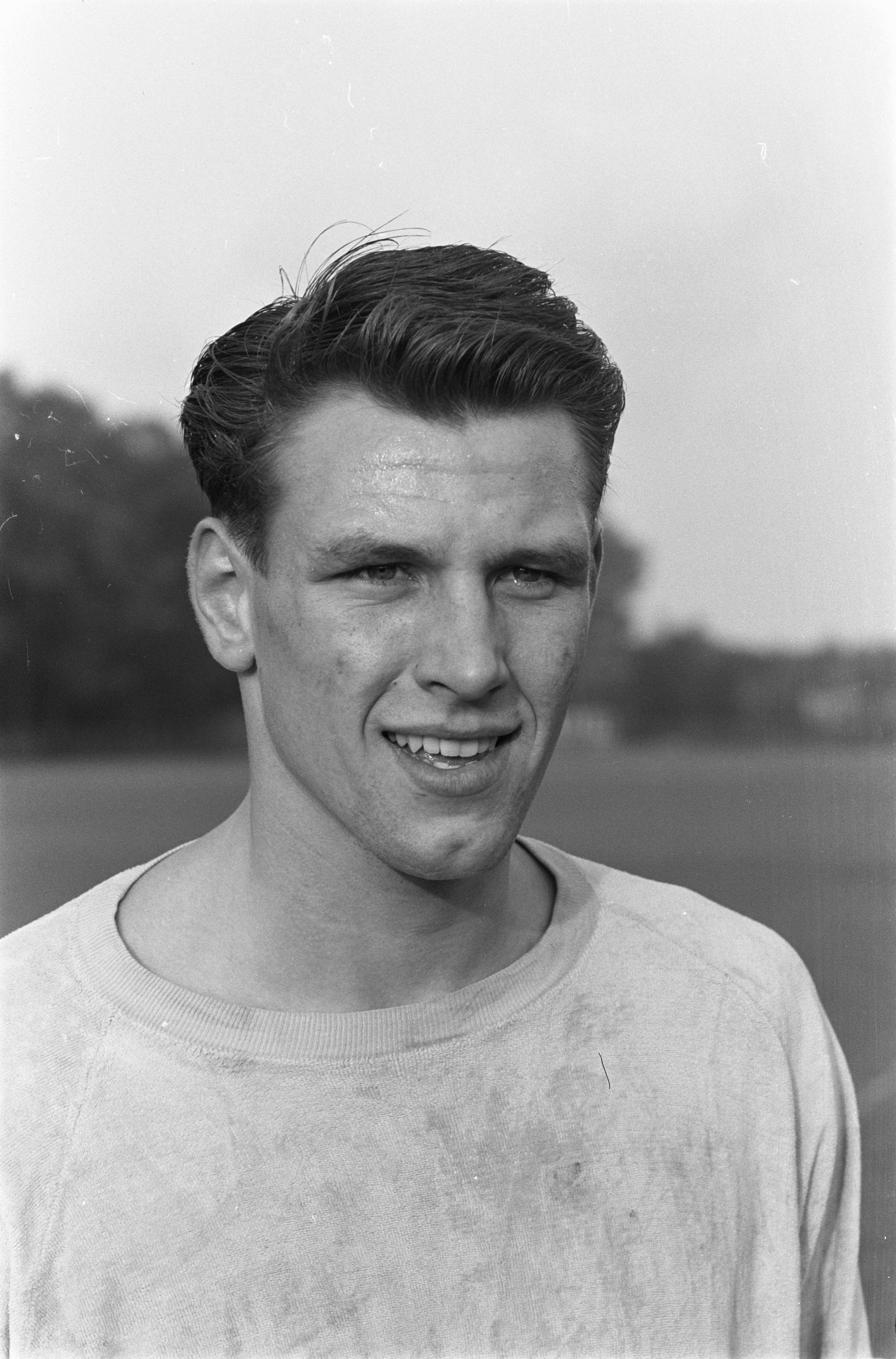
- Van Leeuwen in 1962

Personal information
- Full name: Teunis Pieter van Leeuwen
- Date of birth: 21 March 1943
- Place of birth: Gouda, Netherlands
- Date of death: 15 June 1971 (aged 28)
- Position: Goalkeeper

Youth career
- Jodan Boys
- Vv ONA

Senior career*
Years	Team	Apps	(Gls)
1959–1963	Sparta Rotterdam	25	(0)
1963–1971	GVAV Groningen	232	(2)

International career
1961	Netherlands U19	1	(0)
1967	Netherlands	2	(0)
- * Club domestic league appearances and goals

Teunis Pieter van Leeuwen (21 March 1943 – 15 June 1971) was a Dutch footballer who played as a goalkeeper for GVAV Groningen and Sparta Rotterdam. He made two appearances for the Netherlands national team in 1967.

== Club career ==
=== Early life and Sparta Rotterdam ===
Van Leeuwen was born in Gouda, South Holland, the son of a furniture maker, and grew up in the working-class neighbourhood of Korte Akkeren. He played for local clubs Jodan Boys and Vv ONA before signing for Sparta Rotterdam.

At Sparta Rotterdam, van Leeuwen was brought in as an understudy to Andries van Dijk. Due to van Dijk's injuries he got more playing time than planned and made his senior debut on 1 May 1960 against DWS at the age of 17, keeping a clean sheet in a 0–0 draw. Following an injury, van Leeuwen lost his place as number 1 goalkeeper to Pim Doesburg and wanted to leave the club.

=== GVAV Groningen ===
In 1963 van Leeuwen joined GVAV Groningen as a replacement for Otto Roffel. Groningen paid a transfer fee of 87,500 guilders to Sparta Rotterdam. In the 1969–70 season, he suffered relegation from the Eredivisie with Groningen. Despite offers from other clubs such as Belgian side Anderlecht, he remained at Groningen. In the 1970–71 season he conceded just seven goals – record low number of goals conceded in a season of any major European division –, keeping 23 clean sheets while Groningen achieved promotion back to the Eredivisie. His performances earned him the 1971 Goalkeeper of the Year award.

== International career ==
Van Leeuwen was first called up to the Netherlands national team in 1964. A long suspension he received for striking an opponent delayed his debut. He made his debut on 5 April 1967, in a match against East Germany. The Netherlands lost 4–3 after leading 2–0 with van Leeuwen being criticised for not dealing well with high balls played into the penalty area. He made his second appearance against Hungary, asking to be substituted at halftime with The Netherlands losing 2–0. Van Leeuwen claimed he had sustained an injury to his shoulder but it later transpired that he was nervous.

== Style of play ==
Van Leeuwen was known for his exceptional reflexes, his control of the penalty area and his charisma.

== Legacy ==
Van Leeuwen is considered a cultural icon of Groningen. A grandstand, a train and a street were named after him and a statue of him stands in front of FC Groningen's Euroborg stadium.

== Personal life and death ==
Van Leeuwen had two children, Harold and Irma, with his wife Gerie. In the 1990s it was revealed that he had had a third child, Richard Vennema, with another woman called Karla Vennema. Richard also played football as a goalkeeper. A semi-professional footballer, van Leeuwen worked as a representative at sporting goods manufacturer Quick.

He died at the age of 28 after crashing his car head-on into a truck loaded with concrete pipes on the wrong side of the road in the early morning of 15 June 1971. He was on his way home from the ceremony where he received the 1971 Goalkeeper of the Year award. His wife survived the crash.

== Career statistics ==
Appearances and goals by club, season and competition
Club	Season	League		
Club	Season	Division	Apps	Goals
Sparta Rotterdam	1959–60	Eredivisie	2	0
Sparta Rotterdam	1960–61	Eredivisie	3	0
Sparta Rotterdam	1961–62	Eredivisie	16	0
Sparta Rotterdam	1962–63	Eredivisie	4	0
Sparta Rotterdam	Total		25	0
GVAV Groningen	1963–64	Eredivisie	25	0
GVAV Groningen	1964–65	Eredivisie	21	0
GVAV Groningen	1965–66	Eredivisie	30	0
GVAV Groningen	1966–67	Eredivisie	34	1
GVAV Groningen	1967–68	Eredivisie	34	0
GVAV Groningen	1968–69	Eredivisie	24	0
GVAV Groningen	1969–70	Eredivisie	34	1
GVAV Groningen	1970–71	Eerste Divisie	30	0
GVAV Groningen	Total		232	2
Career total			257	2
