= 1998–99 Eredivisie =

43rd season of the Eredivisie

Eredivisie
- Season: 1998–99
- Dates: 20 August 1998 – 23 May 1999
- Champions: Feyenoord (14th title)
- Promoted: AZ; Cambuur
- Relegated: NAC
- Champions League: Feyenoord; Willem II; PSV
- UEFA Cup: Vitesse Arnhem; Roda JC; Ajax
- Intertoto Cup: sc Heerenveen
- Goals: 964
- Average goals/game: 3.15
- Top goalscorer: (Netherlands) Ruud van Nistelrooy (31 goals)

The Dutch Eredivisie in the 1998–99 season was contested by 18 teams. Feyenoord won the championship.

== League standings ==
| Pos | Team | Pld | W | D | L | GF | GA | GD | Pts | Qualification or relegation |
|---|---|---|---|---|---|---|---|---|---|---|
| 1 | Feyenoord (C) | 34 | 25 | 5 | 4 | 76 | 38 | +38 | 80 | Qualification to Champions League group stage |
| 2 | Willem II | 34 | 20 | 5 | 9 | 69 | 46 | +23 | 65 | Qualification to Champions League group stage |
| 3 | PSV | 34 | 17 | 10 | 7 | 87 | 55 | +32 | 61 | Qualification to Champions League third qualifying round |
| 4 | Vitesse Arnhem | 34 | 18 | 7 | 9 | 61 | 44 | +17 | 61 | Qualification to UEFA Cup first round (Note: Ajax qualified for the UEFA Cup by winning the 1998–99 KNVB Cup.) |
| 5 | Roda JC | 34 | 17 | 9 | 8 | 59 | 40 | +19 | 60 | Qualification to UEFA Cup first round |
| 6 | Ajax | 34 | 16 | 9 | 9 | 73 | 41 | +32 | 57 | Qualification to UEFA Cup first round |
| 7 | SC Heerenveen | 34 | 14 | 12 | 8 | 53 | 41 | +12 | 54 | Qualification to Intertoto Cup third round |
| 8 | FC Twente | 34 | 13 | 13 | 8 | 51 | 45 | +6 | 52 | |
| 9 | AZ | 34 | 12 | 12 | 10 | 52 | 60 | −8 | 48 | |
| 10 | Fortuna Sittard | 34 | 12 | 8 | 14 | 49 | 56 | −7 | 44 | |
| 11 | NEC | 34 | 10 | 9 | 15 | 42 | 56 | −14 | 39 | |
| 12 | FC Utrecht | 34 | 10 | 8 | 16 | 54 | 64 | −10 | 38 | |
| 13 | De Graafschap | 34 | 8 | 12 | 14 | 40 | 57 | −17 | 36 | |
| 14 | MVV | 34 | 7 | 11 | 16 | 42 | 63 | −21 | 32 | |
| 15 | Cambuur | 34 | 7 | 11 | 16 | 37 | 64 | −27 | 32 | |
| 16 | RKC Waalwijk | 34 | 6 | 9 | 19 | 41 | 62 | −21 | 27 | Qualification to Relegation play-offs (Note: RKC and Sparta both remained in the eredivisie after winning their promotion/relegation play-offs.) |
| 17 | Sparta | 34 | 7 | 5 | 22 | 37 | 71 | −34 | 26 | Qualification to Relegation play-offs |
| 18 | NAC Breda (R) | 34 | 4 | 11 | 19 | 41 | 61 | −20 | 23 | Relegation to Eerste Divisie |

Source: rsssf.com
Rules for classification: 1) Points; 2) Goal difference; 3) Goals scored; 4) Head-to-head points; 5) Head-to-head goal difference; 6) Head-to-head away goals scored; 7) Play-off if relevant for deciding champion, relegation or participating in a European league, otherwise by draw. 8) Penalty shoot-out (only after a play-off)
(C) Champions; (R) Relegated

== Results ==
| Home \ Away | AJA | AZ | CAM | FEY | FOR | GRA | HEE | MVV | NAC | NEC | PSV | RKC | ROD | SPA | TWE | UTR | VIT | WIL |
|---|---|---|---|---|---|---|---|---|---|---|---|---|---|---|---|---|---|---|
| Ajax | — | 5–1 | 4–0 | 6–0 | 1–3 | 1–1 | 0–0 | 1–1 | 1–0 | 3–0 | 2–2 | 2–0 | 2–1 | 5–1 | 5–0 | 5–2 | 0–1 | 2–0 |
| AZ | 1–1 | — | 3–1 | 0–2 | 0–3 | 1–3 | 1–3 | 4–2 | 3–0 | 1–1 | 4–1 | 2–1 | 1–0 | 2–0 | 1–1 | 4–3 | 0–0 | 1–1 |
| Cambuur | 4–1 | 0–0 | — | 1–5 | 3–1 | 2–0 | 0–0 | 1–0 | 3–1 | 2–2 | 1–1 | 1–1 | 1–1 | 2–4 | 0–2 | 1–1 | 2–2 | 0–2 |
| Feyenoord | 1–1 | 1–2 | 4–0 | — | 4–1 | 5–0 | 2–1 | 3–1 | 2–2 | 1–0 | 3–1 | 1–0 | 0–0 | 1–0 | 3–1 | 4–2 | 2–1 | 3–2 |
| Fortuna Sittard | 1–0 | 2–2 | 2–0 | 1–2 | — | 0–0 | 1–0 | 0–1 | 2–0 | 2–3 | 6–4 | 3–2 | 0–1 | 2–1 | 0–3 | 3–2 | 0–2 | 1–2 |
| De Graafschap | 1–3 | 1–1 | 2–2 | 3–4 | 0–0 | — | 1–1 | 3–1 | 0–1 | 2–1 | 1–0 | 2–2 | 2–3 | 0–3 | 0–2 | 0–0 | 0–0 | 2–2 |
| Heerenveen | 2–2 | 2–1 | 1–1 | 0–1 | 2–0 | 4–1 | — | 1–1 | 2–1 | 3–2 | 3–3 | 2–0 | 2–2 | 0–0 | 1–0 | 1–0 | 2–1 | 2–2 |
| MVV | 1–4 | 2–1 | 3–0 | 1–3 | 3–3 | 1–2 | 1–0 | — | 3–3 | 0–3 | 1–1 | 1–0 | 0–0 | 1–1 | 2–5 | 1–4 | 4–2 | 1–1 |
| NAC | 2–2 | 1–1 | 2–3 | 0–1 | 1–1 | 0–1 | 2–2 | 2–0 | — | 1–2 | 3–4 | 0–2 | 0–0 | 5–0 | 1–1 | 2–4 | 0–2 | 2–2 |
| NEC | 0–4 | 2–2 | 1–0 | 0–3 | 0–3 | 1–1 | 2–0 | 1–1 | 1–1 | — | 2–2 | 1–1 | 3–1 | 3–1 | 2–2 | 0–1 | 3–1 | 0–3 |
| PSV | 3–1 | 7–1 | 3–0 | 1–2 | 2–0 | 2–2 | 1–2 | 2–0 | 2–0 | 2–0 | — | 2–2 | 3–3 | 4–0 | 3–0 | 5–0 | 3–1 | 1–0 |
| RKC | 0–1 | 2–3 | 4–1 | 0–5 | 0–0 | 1–2 | 0–4 | 2–2 | 2–1 | 0–1 | 3–4 | — | 4–1 | 5–1 | 2–2 | 2–5 | 0–2 | 1–3 |
| Roda | 0–2 | 8–2 | 1–0 | 1–0 | 5–3 | 3–1 | 2–1 | 2–1 | 3–1 | 5–2 | 1–3 | 0–0 | — | 1–0 | 2–0 | 3–0 | 3–1 | 0–2 |
| Sparta Rotterdam | 2–0 | 0–0 | 1–2 | 1–2 | 5–0 | 2–3 | 3–1 | 0–0 | 0–2 | 1–0 | 0–5 | 0–1 | 1–1 | — | 4–2 | 0–1 | 1–3 | 0–4 |
| Twente | 2–1 | 0–3 | 0–0 | 1–1 | 2–2 | 2–1 | 1–2 | 2–1 | 2–2 | 2–0 | 2–2 | 1–0 | 0–0 | 1–0 | — | 1–1 | 0–0 | 5–1 |
| Utrecht | 2–2 | 2–2 | 3–0 | 2–3 | 1–1 | 2–1 | 2–2 | 0–2 | 2–0 | 2–3 | 2–3 | 1–1 | 0–3 | 4–1 | 0–3 | — | 1–2 | 2–0 |
| Vitesse | 3–2 | 0–1 | 4–2 | 1–1 | 1–2 | 2–1 | 1–2 | 2–1 | 3–1 | 1–0 | 3–3 | 2–0 | 1–0 | 5–1 | 1–1 | 2–0 | — | 3–2 |
| Willem II | 3–1 | 2–0 | 2–1 | 4–1 | 1–0 | 2–0 | 3–2 | 4–1 | 2–1 | 1–0 | 4–2 | 3–0 | 1–2 | 3–2 | 1–2 | 1–0 | 3–5 | — |

Legend: Blue = home team win; Yellow = draw; Red = away team win.

== Promotion/relegation play-offs ==
In the promotion/relegation competition, eight entrants (six from the Eerste Divisie and two from this league) entered in two groups. The group winners were promoted to (or remained in) the Eredivisie.

Group 1
| Pos | Team | Pld | W | D | L | GF | GA | GD | Pts | Qualification |
|---|---|---|---|---|---|---|---|---|---|---|
| 1 | RKC Waalwijk | 6 | 5 | 1 | 0 | 11 | 3 | +8 | 16 | Remain in Eredivisie |
| 2 | FC Zwolle | 6 | 2 | 2 | 2 | 8 | 10 | −2 | 8 | Remain in Eerste Divisie |
| 3 | Dordrecht '90 | 6 | 2 | 1 | 3 | 12 | 13 | −1 | 7 | Remain in Eerste Divisie |
| 4 | FC Emmen | 6 | 1 | 0 | 5 | 10 | 15 | −5 | 3 | Remain in Eerste Divisie |

Source: rsssf.com

Group 2
| Pos | Team | Pld | W | D | L | GF | GA | GD | Pts | Qualification |
|---|---|---|---|---|---|---|---|---|---|---|
| 1 | Sparta | 6 | 5 | 0 | 1 | 19 | 6 | +13 | 15 | Remain in Eredivisie |
| 2 | FC Groningen | 6 | 4 | 1 | 1 | 16 | 8 | +8 | 13 | Remain in Eerste Divisie |
| 3 | Excelsior | 6 | 2 | 1 | 3 | 16 | 18 | −2 | 7 | Remain in Eerste Divisie |
| 4 | Helmond Sport | 6 | 0 | 0 | 6 | 5 | 24 | −19 | 0 | Remain in Eerste Divisie |

Source: rsssf.com

== Attendances ==
| No. | Club | Average | Change | Highest |
|---|---|---|---|---|
| 1 | AFC Ajax | 42,567 | -10,0% | 49,500 |
| 2 | Feyenoord | 32,007 | 26,3% | 50,000 |
| 3 | PSV | 26,853 | -3,1% | 29,500 |
| 4 | SBV Vitesse | 22,863 | 65,8% | 26,000 |
| 5 | sc Heerenveen | 13,703 | 0,9% | 14,000 |
| 6 | FC Utrecht | 12,753 | 8,3% | 14,000 |
| 7 | Willem II | 12,202 | 20,7% | 14,800 |
| 8 | FC Twente | 12,006 | 42,1% | 13,500 |
| 9 | NAC Breda | 10,920 | -14,0% | 13,110 |
| 10 | SC Cambuur | 8,418 | 63,4% | 11,200 |
| 11 | De Graafschap | 7,953 | -1,0% | 9,200 |
| 12 | AZ | 7,814 | 30,4% | 10,500 |
| 13 | Roda JC | 7,032 | -4,5% | 10,000 |
| 14 | MVV Maastricht | 6,309 | 3,5% | 9,500 |
| 15 | Fortuna Sittard | 6,268 | 4,9% | 9,000 |
| 16 | NEC | 5,876 | 14,7% | 11,000 |
| 17 | RKC Waalwijk | 5,007 | 13,8% | 7,000 |
| 18 | Sparta Rotterdam | 4,488 | -17,0% | 7,500 |

== See also ==
- 1998–99 Eerste Divisie
- 1998–99 KNVB Cup
