= FC Groningen in European football =

- Club: FC Groningen
- Seasons played: 13
- Top scorer: Mariano Bombarda (6)
- First entry: 1983–84 UEFA Cup
- Latest entry: 2015–16 UEFA Europa League

FC Groningen in European football includes the games which have been played by FC Groningen in European competitions organised by UEFA.

Groningen has played Atlético Madrid and Partizan most in European competition, meeting each team on four occasions. Against both opponents, Groningen recorded two victories and two defeats.

== History ==
=== 1980s: First European matches ===
Groningen made their European debut in the 1983–84 UEFA Cup. In the first round, they won 4–2 on aggregate against Atlético Madrid, highlighted by a 3–0 home win. However, their campaign ended in the second round against Inter Milan, where despite a 2–0 home win, they were eliminated after a 5–1 away loss, resulting in a 5–3 defeat on aggregate.

The club returned to the UEFA Cup in the 1986–87 season. They secured victories over Galway United (8–2 on aggregate) and Neuchâtel Xamax (1–1 on aggregate, advancing on away goals) before being eliminated by Vitória S.C. in the third round.

In the 1988–89 UEFA Cup, Groningen again reached the third round. They faced Atlético Madrid in the first round, progressing on away goals. Subsequent victories over Servette (3–1 on aggregate) saw them advance to the third round, where they were defeated by VfB Stuttgart.

=== 1990s: Brief appearances ===
The early 1990s saw Groningen make brief appearances in European competitions. In the 1991–92 UEFA Cup, they were eliminated in the first round by Rot-Weiß Erfurt, losing both home and away matches 1–0. The following season, 1992–93, Groningen were again eliminated in the first round, following a 2–1 defeat on aggregate against Vác FC-Samsung.

=== 2000s: Return to European football ===
After a 13-year absence, Groningen returned to European football in the mid-2000s. In the 2006–07 UEFA Cup, they faced Partizan in the first round. Despite a 1–0 home victory, a 4–2 away loss led to a 4–3 loss on aggregate. The following season, 2007–08, saw them paired with Fiorentina in the first round. After both legs ended in 1–1 draws, Groningen were eliminated after a penalty shoot-out.

=== 2010s: First major honour and Europa League participations ===
By winning the 2014–15 KNVB Cup, their first major honour, Groningen were granted direct entry into the group stages of the 2015–16 UEFA Europa League. Groningen faced Olympique de Marseille, Braga, and Slovan Liberec. They finished last in the group, drawing twice and losing four times.

== List of matches ==
As of 10 December 2015

Season	Round	Opponent	Home	Away	Aggregate
1983–84 UEFA Cup	First round	(Spain) Atlético Madrid	3–0	1–2	4–2
1983–84 UEFA Cup	Second round	(Italy) Inter Milan	2–0	1–5	3–5
1986–87 UEFA Cup	First round	(Republic of Ireland) Galway United	5–1	3–1	8–2
1986–87 UEFA Cup	Second round	(Switzerland) Neuchâtel Xamax	0–0	1–1	1–1 (a)
1986–87 UEFA Cup	Third round	(Portugal) Vitória S.C.	1–0	0–3	1–3
1988–89 UEFA Cup	First round	(Spain) Atlético Madrid	1–0	1–2	2–2 (a)
1988–89 UEFA Cup	Second round	(Switzerland) Servette	2–0	1–1	3–1
1988–89 UEFA Cup	Third round	(Germany) VfB Stuttgart	1–3	0–2	1–5
1989–90 Cup Winners' Cup	First round	(Denmark) Ikast FS	1–0	2–1	3–1
1989–90 Cup Winners' Cup	Second round	(Serbia) Partizan	4–3	1–3	5–6
1991–92 UEFA Cup	First round	(Germany) Rot-Weiß Erfurt	0–1	0–1	0–2
1992–93 UEFA Cup	First round	(Hungary) Vác FC-Samsung	1–1	0–1	1–2
1995 Intertoto Cup	Group 9	(Czech Republic) Boby Brno Unistav	—N/a	1–2	2nd
1995 Intertoto Cup	Group 9	(Bulgaria) Etar Veliko Tarnovo	3–0	—N/a	2nd
1995 Intertoto Cup	Group 9	(Belgium) Beveren	—N/a	2–2	2nd
1995 Intertoto Cup	Group 9	(Romania) Ceahlăul	0–0	—N/a	2nd
1996 Intertoto Cup	Group 10	(Turkey) Gaziantepspor	1–1	—N/a	3rd
1996 Intertoto Cup	Group 10	(Estonia) Narva Trans	—N/a	4–1	3rd
1996 Intertoto Cup	Group 10	(Hungary) Vasas	1–1	—N/a	3rd
1996 Intertoto Cup	Group 10	(Belgium) Lierse	—N/a	1–2	3rd
1997 Intertoto Cup	Group 10	(Serbia) Čukarički Stankom	1–0	—N/a	2nd
1997 Intertoto Cup	Group 10	(Bulgaria) Spartak Varna	—N/a	2–0	2nd
1997 Intertoto Cup	Group 10	(Romania) Gloria Bistrița	4–1	—N/a	2nd
1997 Intertoto Cup	Group 10	(France) Montpellier	—N/a	0–3	2nd
2006–07 UEFA Cup	First round	(Serbia) Partizan	1–0	2–4	3–4
2007–08 UEFA Cup	First round	(Italy) Fiorentina	1–1	1–1	2–2 (3–4 p)
2014–15 Europa League	2nd qualifying round	(Scotland) Aberdeen	1–2	0–0	1–2
2015–16 Europa League	Group F	(France) Olympique de Marseille	0–3	1–2	4th
2015–16 Europa League	Group F	(Portugal) Braga	0–0	0–1	4th
2015–16 Europa League	Group F	(Czech Republic) Slovan Liberec	0–1	1–1	4th
UEFA club coefficient: No information

== Record by competition ==
As of 10 December 2015

Competition	Participations	Games	Won	Draw	Lost	Goals scored	Goals conceded
UEFA Cup Winners' Cup	1	4	3	0	1	8	7
UEFA Cup	7	24	8	6	10	29	31
UEFA Europa League	2	8	0	3	5	3	10
UEFA Intertoto Cup	3	12	6	4	2	21	12
Total	13	48	17	13	18	61	60

== Record by country ==
As of 10 December 2015

	Country	Games	Won	Draw	Lost	Goals Scored	Goals Against	Opponents
1	Serbia (Note: Including the teams of Yugoslavia and Serbia and Montenegro)	5	3	0	2	9	10	Čukarički Stankom (1), Partizan (4)
2	Germany	4	0	0	4	1	7	Rot-Weiß Erfurt (2), VfB Stuttgart (2)
2	Italy	4	1	2	1	5	7	Fiorentina (2), Inter Milan (2)
2	Portugal	4	1	1	2	1	4	Braga (2), Vitória S.C. (2)
2	Spain	4	2	0	2	6	4	Atlético Madrid (4)
2	Switzerland	4	1	3	0	4	2	Neuchâtel Xamax (2), Servette (2)
7	Czech Republic	3	1	1	1	3	3	Boby Brno Unistav (1), Slovan Liberec (2)
7	France	3	0	0	3	1	8	Montpellier (1), Olympique de Marseille (2)
7	Hungary	3	0	2	1	2	3	Vác FC-Samsung (2), Vasas (1)
10	Belgium	2	0	1	1	3	4	Beveren (1), Lierse (1)
10	Bulgaria	2	2	0	0	5	0	Etar Veliko Tarnovo (1), Spartak Varna (1)
10	Denmark	2	2	0	0	3	2	Ikast FS (2)
10	(Republic of Ireland) Ireland	2	2	0	0	8	2	Galway United (2)
10	Romania	2	1	1	0	4	1	Gloria Bistrița (1), Ceahlăul (1)
10	Scotland	2	0	1	1	1	2	Aberdeen (2)
16	Estonia	1	1	0	0	4	1	Narva Trans (1)
16	Turkey	1	0	1	0	1	1	Gaziantepspor (1)

== Top scorers ==
As of 10 December 2015

#	Goals	Player	Date of last goal	Competition
1	6	(Argentina) Mariano Bombarda	13 July 1997	1997 Intertoto Cup
2	5	(Netherlands) Henny Meijer	18 October 1989	1989–90 Cup Winners' Cup
2	5	(Netherlands) Peter Houtman	1 October 1986	1986–87 UEFA Cup
4	4	(Netherlands) Dean Gorré	29 June 1996	1996 Intertoto Cup
5	3	(Netherlands) Erwin Koeman	19 October 1983	1983–84 UEFA Cup
5	3	(Netherlands) Theo ten Caat	1 November 1989	1989–90 Cup Winners' Cup
