= Elvis van der Laan =

Swedish footballer (born 2005)

Personal information
- Date of birth: 29 February 2008 (age 18)
- Place of birth: Stockholm, Sweden
- Position: Defender

Team information
- Current team: FC Groningen
- Number: 15

Youth career
- –2020: BP
- 2021–2023: IFK Göteborg
- 2024–2025: AIK
- 2025–: FC Groningen

Senior career*
Years	Team	Apps	(Gls)
2025	AIK	2	(0)
2025–	Groningen	0	(0)

International career^{‡}
2023	Sweden U15	2	(0)
2023–2024	Sweden U16	9	(0)
2024–	Sweden U17	9	(1)
2025–	Sweden U18	2	(0)
- * Club domestic league appearances and goals ‡ National team caps and goals as of 14 October 2025

Elvis van der Laan (born 29 February 2008) is a Swedish professional footballer who plays as a defender for Eredivisie club Groningen.

== Early life ==
Van der Laan was born on 29 February 2008. Born in Stockholm, Sweden, he is the son of a Dutch father and a Swedish mother.

== Club career ==
As a youth player, van der Laan joined the youth academy of Swedish side BP. Following his stint there, he joined the youth academy of Swedish side IFK Göteborg in 2021.

Subsequently, he joined the youth academy of Swedish side AIK at the age of fifteen and was promoted to the club's senior team in 2025, where he made two league appearances and scored zero goals. Ahead of the 2025–26 season, he signed for Dutch side FC Groningen.

== International career ==
Van der Laan is a Sweden youth international. During October 2024 and March 2025, he played for the Sweden under-17 national team for 2025 UEFA European Under-17 Championship qualification.
