= Alvin Nordin =

Swedish footballer (born 2007)

Personal information
- Date of birth: 24 December 2007 (age 18)
- Place of birth: Helsingborg Municipality, Sweden
- Positions: Midfielder; winger

Team information
- Current team: FC Groningen
- Number: 16

Youth career
- –2019: Fortuna FF
- Helsingborgs IF
- 2026–: FC Groningen

Senior career*
Years	Team	Apps	(Gls)
2024–2026	Helsingborgs IF	21	(2)
2026–	Groningen	2	(0)

International career^{‡}
2022	Sweden U15		
2024	Sweden U17		
2024–2025	Sweden U18		
2025–	Sweden U19	9	(0)
- * Club domestic league appearances and goals ‡ National team caps and goals as of 31 March 2026

Alvin Nordin (born 24 December 2007) is a Swedish professional footballer who plays as a midfielder or winger for FC Groningen.

== Early life ==
Nordin was born on 24 December 2007. Born in Helsingborg Municipality, Sweden, he is a native of Rydebäck, Sweden.

== Club career ==
As a youth player, Nordin joined the youth academy of Fortuna FF. Following his stint there, he joined the youth academy of Helsingborgs IF and was promoted to the club's senior team in 2024, where he played under Swedish manager Klebér Saarenpää and Scottish manager Stevie Grieve and made twenty-one league appearances and scored two goals and was regarded to have established himself as a regular starter while playing for them.

Ahead of the 2026–27 season, he signed for Dutch side FC Groningen, where he wore the number sixteen jersey. On 28 August 2026, he debuted for the club during a 2–3 home loss to Fortuna Sittard in the league.

== International career ==
Nordin is a Sweden youth international and has represented the country at under-15, under-17, under-18 and under-19 levels.

On 4 September 2025, he debuted for the Sweden men's national under-19 football team during a 2–4 away friendly loss to the Norway men's national under-19 football team. During the autumn of 2025 and the spring of 2026, he played for the Sweden men's national under-19 football team for 2026 UEFA European Under-19 Championship qualification.

== Style of play ==
Nordin plays as a midfielder or winger. Left-footed, he is known for his vision.
