= 1979–80 Eerste Divisie =

24th season of the second-tier football league in Netherlands

Eerste Divisie
- Season: 1979–80
- Champions: FC Groningen
- Promoted: FC Groningen; FC Wageningen
- Goals: 1,050
- Average goals/game: 3.07

The Dutch Eerste Divisie in the 1979–80 season was contested by 19 teams. FC Groningen won the championship.

== New entrants ==
Relegated from the 1978–79 Eredivisie

- FC Volendam
- VVV-Venlo

Dordrecht changed their name to DS '79 this season
Fortuna SC changed their name to Fortuna Sittard this season

== League standings ==
Pos	Team	Pld	W	D	L	GF	GA	GD	Pts	Promotion or qualification
1	FC Groningen	36	25	7	4	79	21	+58	57	Promoted to Eredivisie.
2	FC Volendam	36	23	5	8	76	33	+43	51	Qualified for Promotion play-off as Period champions.
3	FC Wageningen	36	19	13	4	68	40	+28	51	Qualified for Promotion play-off as Period champions.
4	FC Den Bosch	36	22	6	8	66	36	+30	50	
5	SC Cambuur	36	19	4	13	64	41	+23	42	Qualified for Promotion play-off as Period champions.
6	De Graafschap	36	18	6	12	43	31	+12	42	Qualified for Promotion play-off as Period champions.
7	Fortuna Sittard	36	14	11	11	60	42	+18	39	
8	DS '79	36	14	11	11	68	52	+16	39	
9	FC Amsterdam	36	14	10	12	64	55	+9	38	
10	SC Heracles	36	15	7	14	56	51	+5	37	
11	sc Heerenveen	36	13	10	13	42	52	−10	36	
12	VVV-Venlo	36	13	9	14	55	68	−13	35	
13	Telstar	36	10	11	15	50	58	−8	31	
14	FC Eindhoven	36	11	8	17	44	61	−17	30	
15	Helmond Sport	36	10	7	19	50	80	−30	27	
16	SC Veendam	36	7	8	21	44	74	−30	22	
17	SVV	36	7	8	21	51	90	−39	22	
18	FC Vlaardingen	36	6	9	21	36	66	−30	21	
19	SC Amersfoort	36	4	6	26	34	99	−65	14	

Source: rsssf.com

== Promotion competition ==
In the promotion competition, four period winners (the best teams during each of the four quarters of the regular competition) played for promotion to the Eredivisie.

Pos	Team	Pld	W	D	L	GF	GA	GD	Pts	Promotion
1	FC Wageningen	6	4	0	2	10	8	+2	8	Promoted to Eredivisie.
2	FC Volendam	6	2	2	2	5	5	0	6	
3	De Graafschap	6	2	1	3	10	9	+1	5	
4	SC Cambuur	6	1	3	2	6	9	−3	5	

Source: rsssf.com

== Attendances ==
#	Club	Average
1	Groningen	9,861
2	DS '79	6,994
3	Cambuur	5,906
4	Den Bosch	5,133
5	Wageningen	4,022
6	Volendam	3,850
7	De Graafschap	3,794
8	Heerenveen	3,489
9	Heracles	3,483
10	Veendam	3,244
11	VVV	3,114
12	Eindhoven	3,028
13	Fortuna	2,911
14	Helmond	2,803
15	Telstar	1,561
16	Vlaardingen	1,483
17	SVV	1,419
18	Amersfoort	1,211
19	Amsterdam	962

== See also ==
- 1979–80 Eredivisie
- 1979–80 KNVB Cup
