= FC Groningen =

Professional football club from Groningen

Groningen
- Full name: Football Club Groningen
- Nicknames: Trots van het Noorden (lit. 'Pride of the North'); De FC (lit. 'The FC')
- Founded: 16 June 1971; 55 years ago
- Ground: Euroborg
- Capacity: 22,550
- Owner: FC Groningen Beheer B.V.
- Chairman: Jakob Klompien
- Head coach: Dick Lukkien
- League: Eredivisie
- 2025–26: Eredivisie, 9th of 18
- Website: www.fcgroningen.nl
Home colours

Football Club Groningen (Dutch pronunciation: [ɛfˈseː ˈɣroːnɪŋə(n)]) is a Dutch professional association football club based in Groningen. Founded in 1971 as the successor of GVAV, Groningen compete in the Eredivisie, the first tier of Dutch football.

Groningen played in the Eredivisie during their first three seasons, before the side were relegated to the Eerste Divisie in 1973–74 as they got into financial difficulties. Groningen were promoted back to the Eredivisie as champions in 1979–80 with a squad composed mostly of players who were recruited from the club's youth academy, and remained in the top flight for 18 seasons before they dropped to the second tier in 1997–98. The team won promotion back to the Eredivisie in 1999–2000, where they remained for 23 seasons before suffering relegation in 2022–23. Groningen finished as runners-up in the 2023–24 Eerste Divisie and returned to the Eredivisie at the first attempt.

Groningen have won the KNVB Cup once, in 2014–15, and were runners-up in 1988–89. Groningen achieved their highest league finish in 1990–91 when they ranked third in the Eredivisie, competing for the league title until the latter part of the season. The side have participated in European competitions on several occasions; Groningen's first participation in European competition came during the 1983–84 UEFA Cup, when they defeated Atlético Madrid on aggregate in the first round, but were eliminated by Inter Milan in the following round. Erwin Koeman, Ronald Koeman, Arjen Robben and Virgil van Dijk started their careers at Groningen, while it was Luis Suárez's first European club.

The team's first home ground was Oosterparkstadion; since 2006, they have played their home games at Euroborg. Groningen's home kit colours are based on the city's coat of arms: green and white. The club is nicknamed "Trots van het Noorden" (lit. 'Pride of the North'), and has a rivalry with Frisian side Heerenveen, with whom it contests the Derby van het Noorden (lit. 'Derby of the North').

== History ==
=== Foundation ===
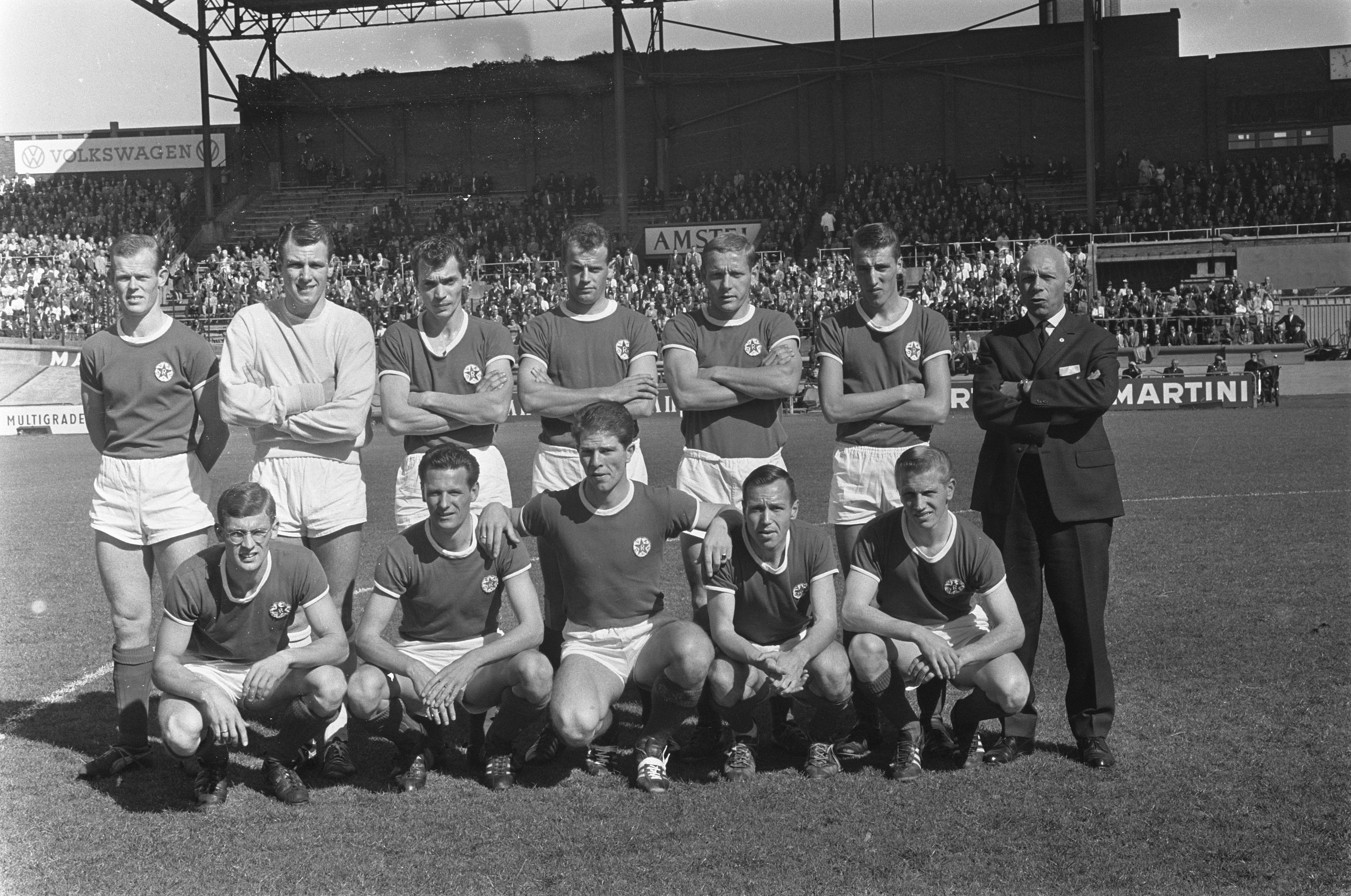
GVAV in 1964, away at DWS

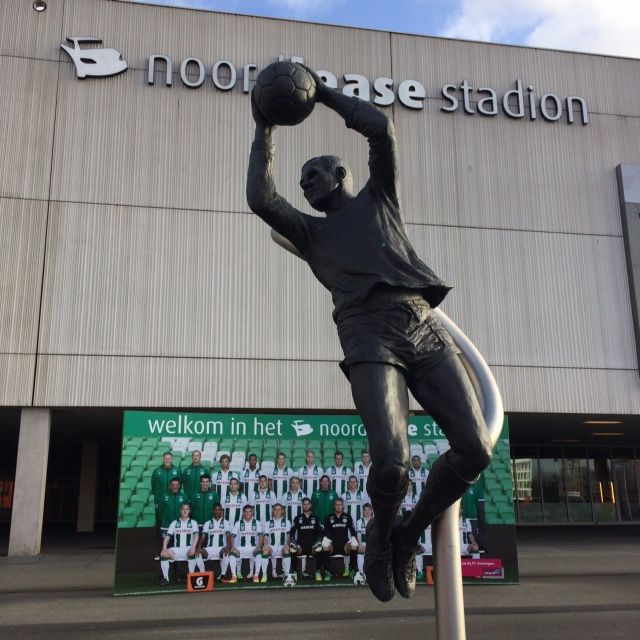
Statue of goalkeeper Tonny van Leeuwen. He died a day before Groningen's foundation.

Established in 1921, GVAV were founder members of the Eredivisie in 1956, the first tier of Dutch football. At the time, they were one of four professional teams from the city of Groningen, alongside Be Quick, Velocitas and Oosterparkers. GVAV soon faced significant financial difficulties; as a result, "Stichting Betaald Voetbal GVAV" (lit. 'Professional Football Foundation GVAV') was established in 1963—a triumvirate of GVAV, the Groningen City Council and a consortium of local businesses. Each party contributed 300,000 Dutch guilders, becoming equal shareholders in the foundation. GVAV's finances remained fragile, however, also putting the future of professional football in Groningen at risk, especially as GVAV had become the city’s only remaining professional team. The side remained in the Eredivisie until they were relegated to the Eerste Divisie in 1969–70.

In February 1970, Harm Brink, the chairman of amateur club GRC Groningen, proposed the creation of a new professional team to represent Groningen. His idea gained support from several local amateur clubs, while both the local businesses and the Groningen City Council were willing to write off the debts of Stichting Betaald Voetbal GVAV. In September 1970, a majority of GVAV's members voted in favour of Brink's proposal. GVAV won promotion to the Eredivisie after a one-year absence, and Football Club Groningen was founded on 16 June 1971 as the successor of GVAV, who returned to amateur football.

During the 1970–71 season, GVAV goalkeeper Tonny van Leeuwen had conceded only seven goals—the fewest of any goalkeeper in Dutch football—and was honoured by the Royal Dutch Football Association in Rotterdam. Van Leeuwen died in a car accident on his way home, just one day before Groningen's foundation. The side played their first match on 17 July 1971, defeating German Regionalliga side TSR Olympia Wilhelmshaven 6–0. Groningen wore a green and white kit, the colours of the city's coat of arms.

=== Financial difficulties and European matches (1971–1991) ===
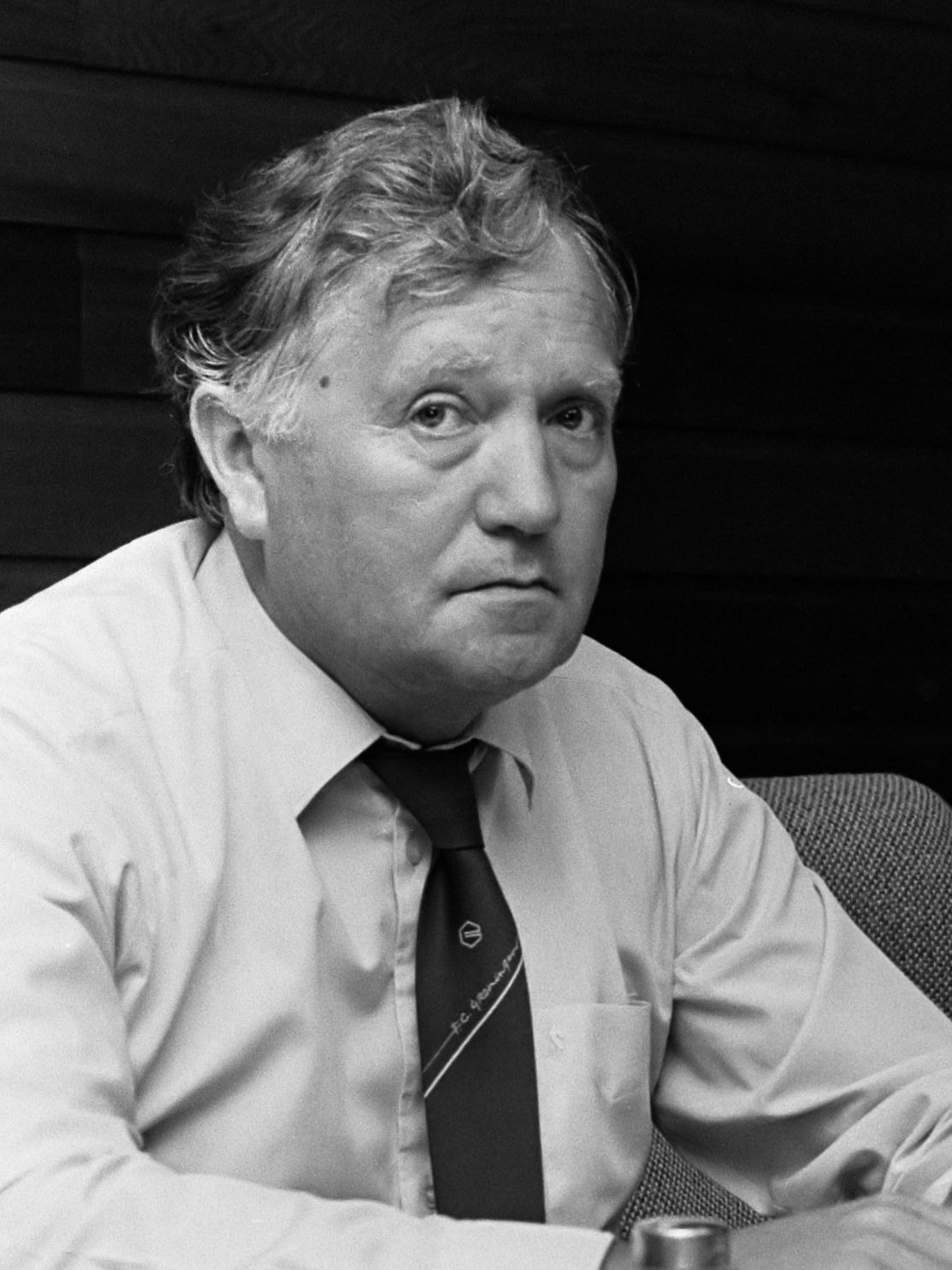
Renze de Vries (pictured in 1984), Groningen's chairman from 1980 to 1989

Groningen lost their first league game 1–0 at home against FC Utrecht in front of 13,000 spectators. The team recorded their first league victory on the 10th matchday—a 2–1 win at Vitesse—and finished the 1971–72 Eredivisie season 12th out of 18 sides. The club was still mired in financial difficulties; to cut transfer expenses, Groningen established a scouting system. In 1973–74, they suffered a club record 9–0 defeat to Ajax, ranked bottom of the league table and were relegated to the Eerste Divisie. The club came close to bankruptcy but was saved by the Groningen City Council. In 1974–75, Groningen finished runners-up to NEC Nijmegen, missing out on the title due to an inferior goal difference. Although the side qualified for the play-offs which determined the second and final team to gain promotion to the Eredivisie, they finished second behind FC Eindhoven and remained in the second tier. In 1975, Groningen established a youth boarding school as the club tried to rebuild the squad with homegrown players. The side finished eighth in the 1976–77 Eerste Divisie—their lowest-ever league finish—before missing promotion to the Eredivisie in the promotion play-offs in 1977–78, despite Peter Houtman scoring a club record 31 goals during the season. Groningen finished runners-up to Excelsior in 1978–79, but returned to the Eredivisie as champions during the following season under coach Theo Verlangen, losing only 4 of 36 matches. Most of the squad that won promotion had progressed through Groningen's youth academy.

In the 1982–83 season, Groningen qualified for European competition for the first time following a 5th-place finish, meaning that they would enter the 1983–84 UEFA Cup. Key player Ronald Koeman left the club during the off-season in 1983 and joined Ajax, while his brother Erwin remained at the club; both players had made their debut at Groningen. The team's first European game was an away match against Atlético Madrid, losing 2–1 after being 1–0 ahead. Groningen recorded a surprising 3–0 victory in the return game, winning 4–2 on aggregate. They faced Inter Milan in the second round; Groningen won 2–0 at home ground Oosterparkstadion, but lost 5–1 away and were eliminated from the competition. Groningen competed in European competition again on five occasions from 1986 to 1992, reaching the third round in the 1986–87 UEFA Cup and in the 1988–89 UEFA Cup.

As a result of their successful spell, Groningen became almost a fully professional side by the mid-1980s—only Jan van Dijk and Adri van Tiggelen remained semi-professional players. The club also recorded the fourth highest average home attendances in Dutch football—behind Ajax, PSV and Feyenoord—as it attracted more than 10,000 fans for each match. In 1989, Groningen reached their first KNVB Cup final, losing 4–1 against PSV. During the same year, Groningen chairman Renze de Vries was found guilty by the Fiscal Information and Investigation Service (FIOD) of embezzlement and the use of dirty money to sign several players between 1984 and 1989. De Vries, the club's chairman since 1980, stepped down and spent several days in prison. Multiple other Eredivisie clubs were also investigated and punished by the FIOD during this period, with Groningen receiving an additional assessment of 700,000 Dutch guilders from the Tax and Customs Administration. The club was saddled with debt and again came close to bankruptcy. Despite the financial situation, the team recorded their highest-ever league finish in 1990–91: third place. Managed by Hans Westerhof, Groningen competed for the league title with Ajax and PSV until the latter part of the season, when suspensions and injuries to first-team players saw them drop points. Groningen's Henny Meijer was named Dutch Footballer of the Year after the season ended.

=== New stadium and the first major honour (1991–2021) ===
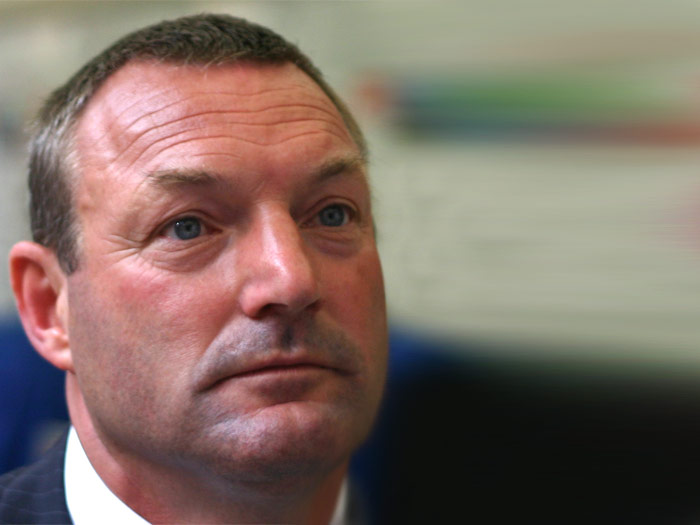
Ron Jans (pictured in 2007), Groningen's coach from 2002 to 2010

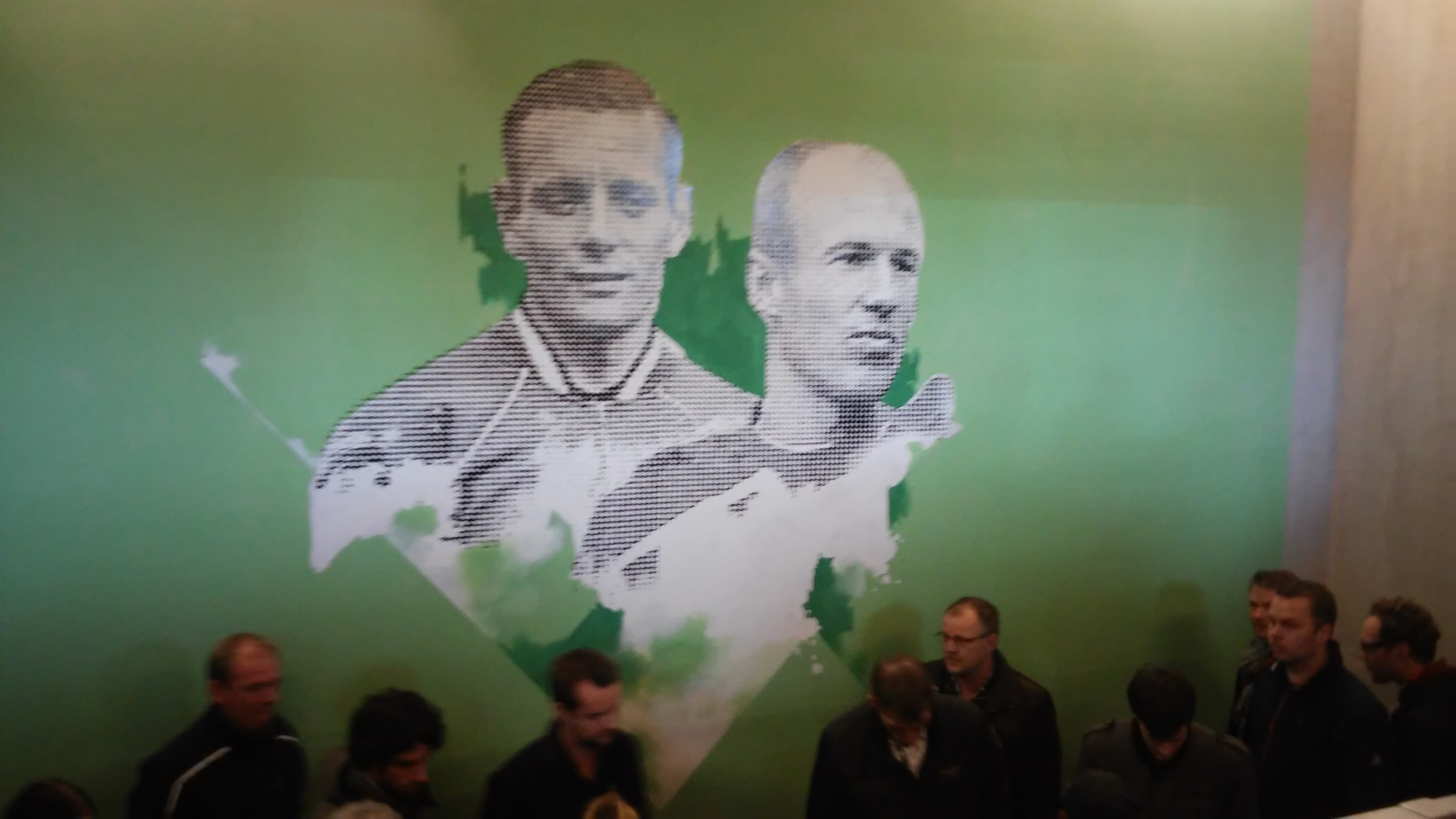
Mural of Piet Fransen (left) and Arjen Robben (right) in Euroborg

Although Groningen recorded a 5th-place finish in 1991–92 and qualified for the 1992–93 UEFA Cup, the team began to slide down the league table; they were eventually relegated to the Eerste Divisie in 1997–98. The club had little financial resources left, and made many managerial changes in a search for success. The side returned to the Eredivisie in 1999–2000 following a first-place finish in the promotion play-offs group. During the season, Groningen set several club records: they scored 81 goals, won 10 matches in a row and recorded their largest victory—10–1 against DVS '33 in the KNVB Cup. In December 2000, the 16-year-old Arjen Robben made his professional debut under coach Jan van Dijk. Robben, later regarded as one of the best players of his generation, was soon sold to PSV for a fee of 3.9 million euros. Groningen avoided relegation during their first seasons back in the Eredivisie, and under coach Ron Jans, appointed in 2002, the team even began to return into the top half of the league.

In January 2006, Groningen moved from the outdated Oosterparkstadion—the club's first home ground—to the newly-built Euroborg. The club's average home attendance increased from 12,000 in Oosterparkstadion to around 20,000 in its new stadium. Groningen went the first 15 league games unbeaten at Euroborg, and the stadium was soon nicknamed "De Groene Hel" (lit. 'The Green Hell'). The side finished the 2005–06 season in fifth place and qualified for the play-offs which determined a place in the preliminary round of the UEFA Champions League. Groningen reached the final but were narrowly beaten by Ajax on aggregate, after Ajax scored in the last minutes of the second leg, with the team instead qualifying for the 2006–07 UEFA Cup. Groningen again qualified for the UEFA Cup the following season, but were eliminated in the preliminary round by Italian side Fiorentina after a penalty shootout. In 2010, Jans left the club and went to local rivals Heerenveen, and was succeeded by former Groningen player Pieter Huistra.

The team finished 5th in 2010–11 under Huistra, reaching the European competition play-off final; they turned around a 5–1 deficit against ADO Den Haag but lost after a penalty shootout. In 2013–14, coach Erwin van de Looi led Groningen to victory in the European competition play-off final and qualification for the 2014–15 UEFA Europa League, where they were eliminated by Aberdeen in the second qualifying round. Groningen claimed their first major honour during the season, however, defeating PEC Zwolle 2–0 in the 2015 KNVB Cup final. They became the third Groningen-based team to win a major honour, after Be Quick (1919–20 Dutch League Championship) and Velocitas (1933–34 KNVB Cup). By winning the cup, they qualified for the 2015–16 UEFA Europa League group stage. The side gained only two points from six matches and finished their group in bottom place. In 2019, Hans Nijland—the club's CEO since 1996 and the longest-serving director in Dutch professional football—stepped down and was replaced by Excelsior's Wouter Gudde.

=== Relegation and promotion (2021–present) ===
In 2022–23, Groningen finished in bottom place, winning only 4 of 34 matches, and were relegated to the Eerste Divisie for the third time. Before the start of the season, the German Frank Wormuth was appointed coach. He was sacked in November 2022, after which Wormuth labelled the working conditions as "mentally unsafe". Under his successor, Dennis van der Ree, Groningen won only once in 21 matches, and were eliminated from the KNVB Cup at home by amateur club Spakenburg. Gudde concluded the squad was unfit, unbalanced, and lacked quality and "personality". Under coach Dick Lukkien, Groningen finished runners-up in the Eerste Divisie in 2023–24 and were promoted back to the Eredivisie with a squad largely composed of players who had progressed through the club's youth academy. They clinched second place by defeating direct rivals Roda JC 2–0 on the final matchday, overtaking them in the standings.

== Crest and colours ==
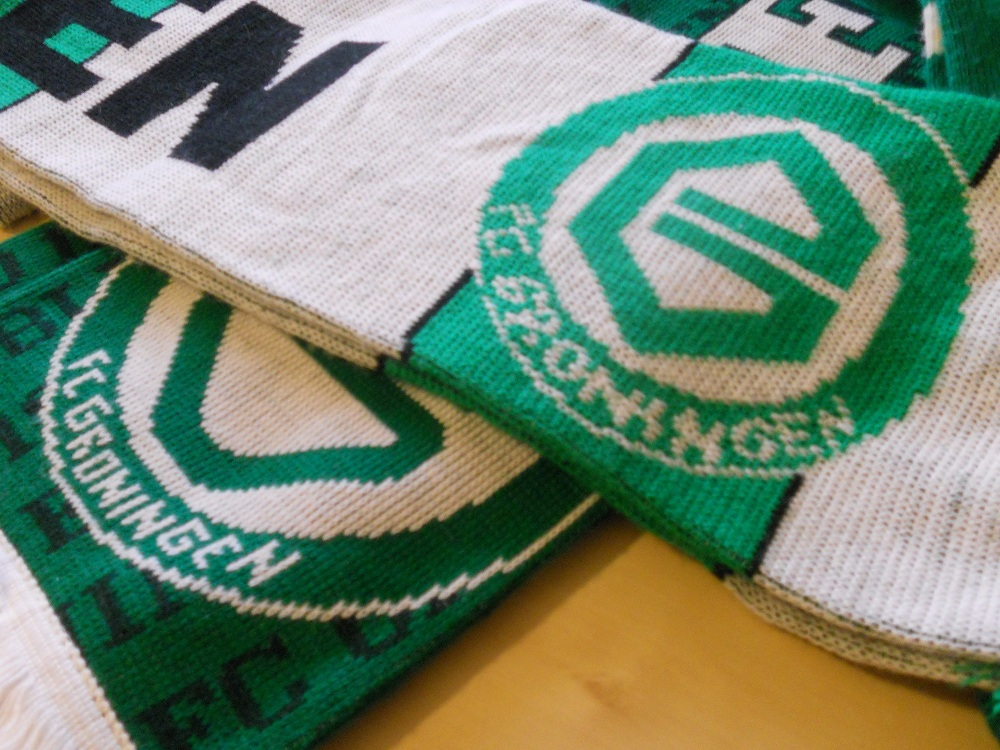
Groningen supporter scarfs with the club crest

Shortly after its founding in June 1971, Nieuwsblad van het Noorden organised a competition to design a crest for the club. The winning design, submitted by the 21-year-old Reint Rozema, a designer at a local printing house, featured an abstract letter "G" representing Groningen. In 1993, board member and commercial manager Jos Smulders added a Pegasus to the badge to give Groningen a more "dynamic and aggressive" image. However, following criticism from fans and the local press, the Pegasus was removed in 1996 and the original crest was restored.

Groningen's kit colours have been green and white since the club's foundation, derived from the city's coat of arms. During the first seasons, the team also played in a purple shirt. Groningen's jerseys had no kit sponsor until 1975, when Adidas became the first to have its logo on the club's shirt. The first sponsor's name to appear on Groningen shirts was that of insurance company AGO, which featured from 1982 to 1983. Since then, the club has had a variety of kit manufacturers and shirt sponsors. Until 1991, the club used various permutations of green and white on its home kits, when it adopted a white shirt with two vertical green stripes.

== Stadium ==
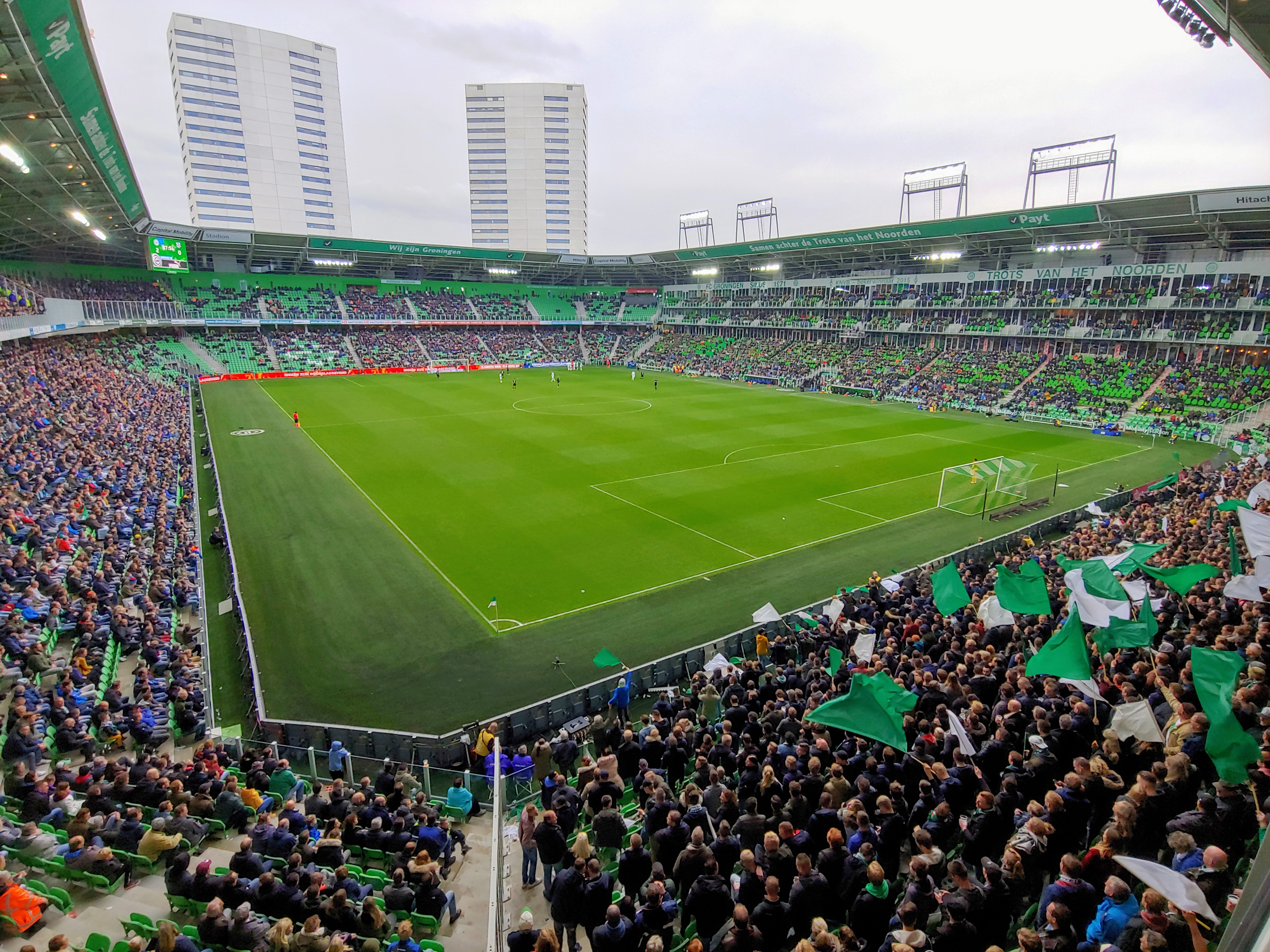
Euroborg during a match in 2018

Since January 2006, Groningen have played their home matches at Euroborg, which replaced Oosterparkstadion, the home of GVAV and Groningen since the 1930s. The Netherlands national team played two international matches at Oosterparkstadion: against Cyprus in 1981 and in 1983 against Iceland. In 1985, Groningen recorded their largest attendance at the stadium during a 1–1 draw against Feyenoord, when 21,500 spectators attended. The club first expressed an interest in building a new stadium away from Oosterparkstadion in 1996 as it had become outdated and had only a capacity of around 12,500. In 2004, the club began construction of Euroborg, designed by architect Wiel Arets. The stadium was officially opened on 13 January 2006 with a match against Heerenveen, which Groningen won 2–0.

Euroborg hosted the final of the 2007 UEFA European Under-21 Championship, in which the Netherlands defeated Serbia 4–1. In 2014, Groningen became the first Dutch club to install its own solar power plant, with more than 1,000 solar panels fitted to the stadium's roof to make the club "more eco-friendly". The ground hosted its first senior women's international match in 2017, when the Netherlands played Norway. It staged its first senior men's international game in June 2025, as the Netherlands defeated Malta 8–0 in a 2026 World Cup qualifier match.

Euroborg's current capacity is 22,550, and is nicknamed "De Groene Hel" (lit. 'The Green Hell') and "De Groene Kathedraal" (lit. 'The Green Cathedral'). The stadium consists of four stands: the Tonny van Leeuwen Tribune, the Piet Fransen Tribune, the Koeman Familie Tribune and a stand containing skyboxes.

== Supporters and rivalries ==
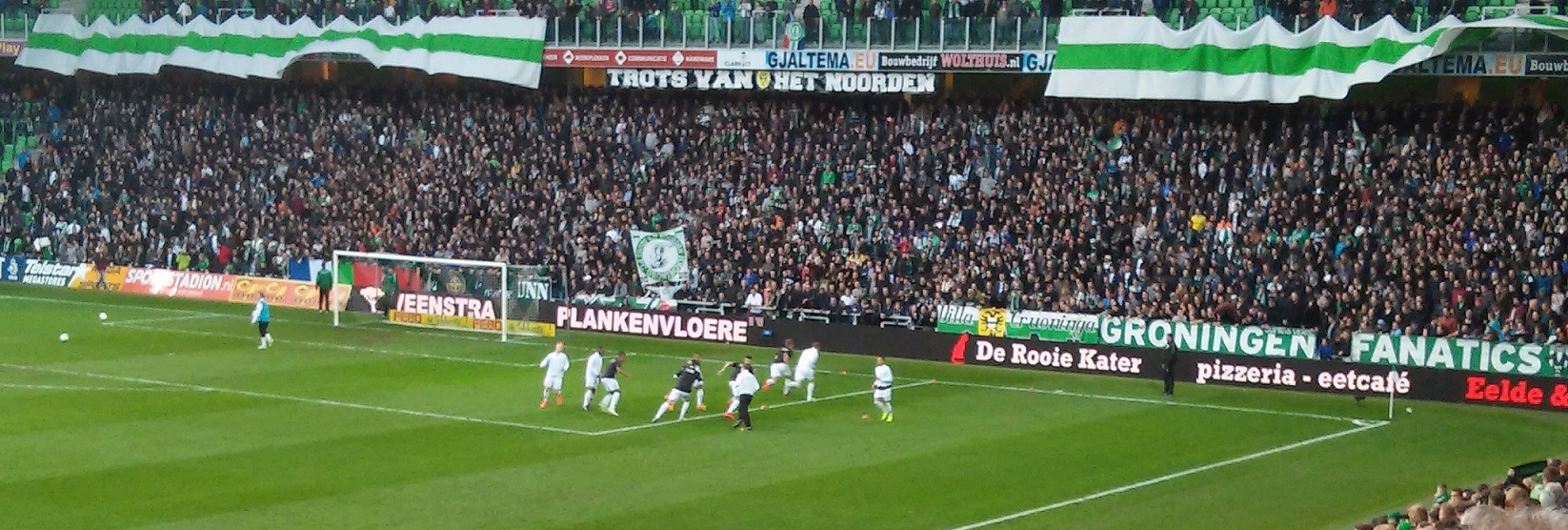
Groningen fans before a game in 2015

The club's supporters are mainly drawn from the provinces of Groningen and Drenthe. During their early years, Groningen, and their predecessor GVAV, also had a decent following in Friesland as they were the only northern team competing in the Eredivisie at the time, which earned them the nickname "Trots van het Noorden" (lit. 'Pride of the North'). During the late 1970s, an ultras group known as the Z-side emerged from within Groningen's fanbase. The Z-side and other Groningen ultras groups have had long-standing friendships with the ultras and hooligans of Roma, Beerschot and Rot-Weiß Erfurt. The club's fans also have had a long-standing friendship with supporters of Scottish team Hibernian since the 1990s.

As Groningen are one of the few professional sides from the Northern Netherlands and the only team from the province of Groningen, the team lack rivalries. Until local side Veendam was dissolved in 2013, Groningen contested the Groningse derby with them. The sides met only four times in the Eredivisie—in 1986–87 and 1988–89, with both teams winning once—as Veendam spent most of their existence in the lower tiers. During the 1990s, Groningen contested heated matches with Twente as hooligans of both clubs often clashed. In the same period, a local rivalry between Groningen and Frisian club Heerenveen developed—known as the Derby van het Noorden (lit. 'Derby of the North')—following Heerenveen's first-ever promotion to the Eredivisie in 1989–90. Groningen went down to the Eerste Divisie in 1998, and by 2000, had been overtaken in performance by Heerenveen. The rivalry intensified during the 2000s, and supporters of both clubs engaged in a series of pranks and provocations, such as Groningen fans painting the statue of Heerenveen's Abe Lenstra in green and white colours. The rivalry began to fade in the mid-2010s after another Frisian club, Cambuur, won promotion to the Eredivisie; Heerenveen regard Cambuur as their main rivals.

== Players ==
=== First-team squad ===
As of 16 September 2026

Note: Flags indicate national team as defined under FIFA eligibility rules; some limited exceptions apply. Players may hold more than one non-FIFA nationality.

No.	Pos.	Nation	Player
1	GK	SUR	Etienne Vaessen
2	DF	NED	Wouter Prins
3	DF	NED	Thijmen Blokzijl (captain)
4	DF	HUN	Márk Csinger
5	DF	GER	Marco Rente
7	MF	NOR	Travis Hernes
8	MF	NED	Tika de Jonge
9	FW	ISL	Brynjólfur Willumsson
11	FW	SWE	Jacob Ondrejka (on loan from Parma)
12	DF	SVK	Nikolas Brandis
13	GK	SLO	Lovro Štubljar
14	MF	NED	Jorg Schreuders
15	DF	SWE	Elvis van der Laan
16	MF	SWE	Alvin Nordin

No.	Pos.	Nation	Player
17	MF	NED	David van der Werff
18	MF	NED	Tygo Land (on loan from PSV Eindhoven)
19	FW	POL	Oskar Zawada
20	FW	NED	Nils Eggens
21	DF	SWE	Malcolm Jeng (on loan from Reims)
24	MF	NED	Pelle Clement
26	FW	NED	Thom van Bergen
29	DF	CUW	Tyrique Mercera
30	GK	NED	Pelle Boevink
31	GK	NED	Rijk Janse
33	DF	NED	Hans Hateboer
34	FW	NED	Ryan Metu
42	DF	NED	Jesper Mosselaar

== Management ==
=== Football management ===
Position	Name
Head coach	Dick Lukkien
Assistant coaches	Casper Goedkoop; Mischa Visser
Director of football	Mohammed Allach
Chairman	Jakob Klompien
Chief executive officer	Frank van Mosselveld
Chief operating officer	Marc-Jan Oldenbandringh
Chief commercial officer	Jordi Hillenga

=== Coaches ===
Ron Groenewoud was the club's first coach; he was relegated with Groningen to the Eerste Divisie in 1974 and remained in charge until 1975. The team won the Eerste Divisie title in 1979–80 under coach Theo Verlangen, who also led them to qualification for their first European campaign in 1983. Groningen recorded their best league finish under Hans Westerhof: third in the 1990–91 Eredivisie. After relegation in 1998, the side won promotion back to the top flight in 1999–2000 with Jan van Dijk in charge. Erwin van de Looi led Groningen to their first major honour: the 2014–15 KNVB Cup. The German Frank Wormuth became the club's first foreign coach when he took the post in 2022. Under Dick Lukkien, the side won promotion back to the top flight in 2023–24.

== Honours ==
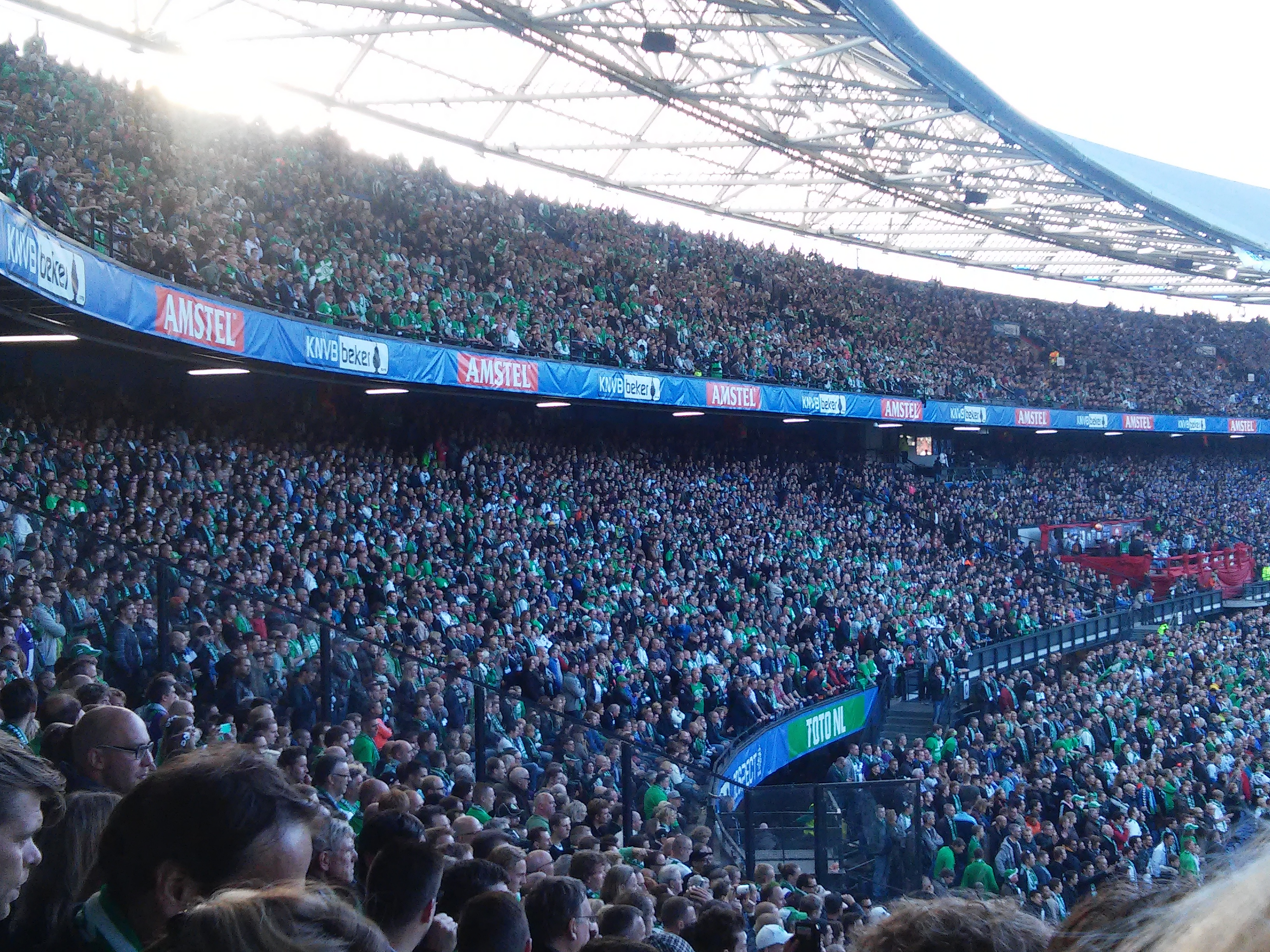
Groningen fans during the 2015 KNVB Cup Final

- Eerste Divisie (Tier 2)
  - Winners: 1979–80
  - Promoted: 2023–24
  - Promotion play-off winners: 1999–2000
- KNVB Cup
  - Winners: 2014–15
  - Runners-up: 1988–89
- Johan Cruyff Shield
  - Runners-up: 2015

== Records and statistics ==
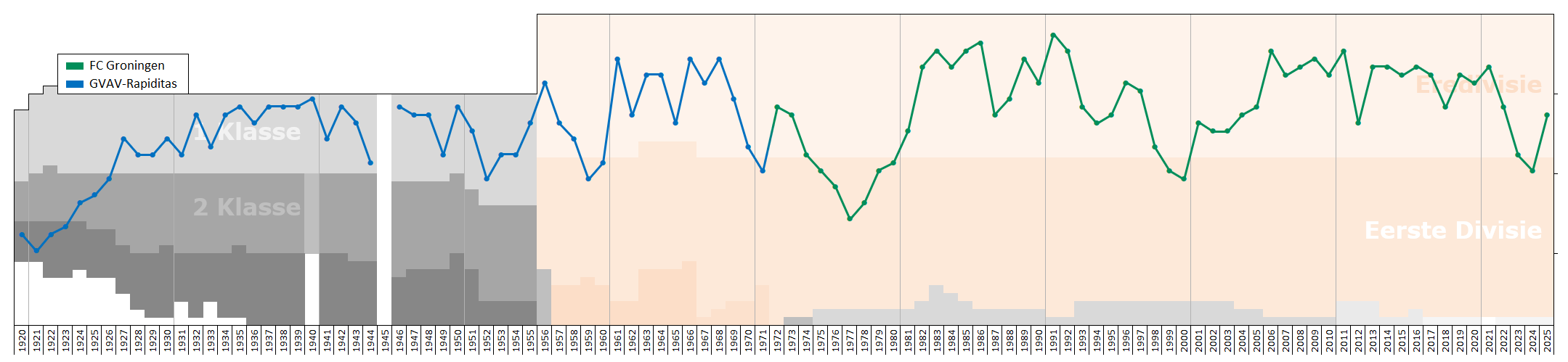
Historical chart of Groningen's league performance (including GVAV)

The record for the most first team appearances in all competitions for Groningen is held by Jan van Dijk, who played 537 games between 1975 and 1992. The club's top goal scorer is Peter Houtman, who scored 128 goals in three spells for Groningen. He also holds the club record for the most goals scored in a season, when he netted 31 times in 1977–78. In 1991, Henny Meijer won the Dutch Footballer of the Year award, the first and to date only time a Groningen player achieved this.

The youngest player to make an appearance for the club is Richairo Živković, who was aged 16 years and 88 days on his debut against Heracles Almelo in 2012. The oldest player to make an appearance for Groningen is goalkeeper Peter van der Vlag, who played his last match aged 37 years and 163 days against NAC Breda in 2015.

Groningen's largest victory has been a 10–1 win against DVS '33 in the 1999–2000 KNVB Cup. The club's largest win in league football has been a 7–1 home victory against Willem II in the 2010–11 Eredivisie. The club's largest defeat is a 9–0 loss to Ajax in the 1973–74 Eredivisie. The highest transfer fee received by Groningen is the €11 million from Celta de Vigo for Norwegian striker Jørgen Strand Larsen in 2022, while the highest transfer fee paid by the club was for Nigerian midfielder Oluwafemi Ajilore from Midtjylland in 2008; he was bought for a fee of €3.3 million.
