= 1999–2000 Eerste Divisie =

44th season of the second-tier football league in Netherlands

Eerste Divisie
- Season: 1999–2000
- Champions: NAC Breda
- Promoted: NAC Breda; FC Groningen; RBC Roosendaal
- Goals: 985
- Average goals/game: 3.21

The Dutch Eerste Divisie in the 1999–00 season was contested by 18 teams. NAC Breda won the championship.

== New entrants ==
Relegated from the 1998–99 Eredivisie

- NAC Breda

== League standings ==
Pos	Team	Pld	W	D	L	GF	GA	GD	Pts	Promotion or qualification
1	NAC Breda	34	27	1	6	84	36	+48	82	Promotion to Eredivisie
2	FC Zwolle	34	22	8	4	90	41	+49	74	Play-offs
3	FC Groningen	34	23	5	6	81	33	+48	74	Play-offs
4	Excelsior	34	18	5	11	70	48	+22	59	Play-offs
5	FC Emmen	34	18	4	12	53	45	+8	58	Play-offs
6	RBC Roosendaal	34	17	6	11	65	49	+16	57	Play-offs
7	Heracles Almelo	34	13	8	13	41	42	−1	47	Play-offs
8	Dordrecht '90	34	12	9	13	55	58	−3	45	
9	FC Eindhoven	34	14	3	17	47	63	−16	45	
10	Helmond Sport	34	13	3	18	45	57	−12	42	
11	ADO Den Haag	34	12	6	16	37	52	−15	42	
12	Veendam	34	10	11	13	50	61	−11	41	
13	Telstar	34	11	4	19	44	59	−15	37	
14	Go Ahead Eagles	34	9	9	16	56	58	−2	36	
15	VVV-Venlo	34	8	11	15	38	62	−24	35	
16	HFC Haarlem	34	9	5	20	54	72	−18	32	
17	FC Volendam	34	8	7	19	40	75	−35	31	
18	TOP Oss	34	8	3	23	35	74	−39	27	

Source: rsssf.com

== Promotion/relegation play-offs ==
In the promotion/relegation competition, eight entrants (six from this league and two from the Eredivisie) entered in two groups. The group winners were promoted to the Eredivisie.

Group 1
Pos	Team	Pld	W	D	L	GF	GA	GD	Pts	Promotion or relegation
1	FC Groningen	6	5	1	0	19	7	+12	16	Promotion to Eredivisie
2	FC Emmen	6	2	2	2	8	10	−2	8	
3	MVV	6	2	1	3	11	14	−3	7	Relegation from Eredivisie
4	Heracles Almelo	6	1	1	4	10	17	−7	4	

Source: rsssf.com

Group 2
Pos	Team	Pld	W	D	L	GF	GA	GD	Pts	Promotion or relegation
1	RBC Roosendaal	6	3	2	1	10	7	+3	11	Promotion to Eredivisie
2	FC Zwolle	6	3	1	2	14	7	+7	10	
3	Excelsior	6	2	1	3	11	14	−3	7	
4	Cambuur Leeuwarden	6	1	2	3	6	13	−7	5	Relegation from Eredivisie

Source: rsssf.com

== Attendances ==
#	Club	Average
1	NAC	9,812
2	Groningen	8,259
3	Emmen	4,869
4	Heracles	4,814
5	Zwolle	4,783
6	Veendam	4,249
7	Go Ahead	3,339
8	RBC	3,073
9	ADO	2,798
10	VVV	2,175
11	Volendam	2,046
12	Eindhoven	1,950
13	Excelsior	1,909
14	Helmond	1,889
15	Oss	1,813
16	Haarlem	1,708
17	Dordrecht	1,565
18	Telstar	1,427

== See also ==
- 1999–2000 Eredivisie
- 1999–2000 KNVB Cup
