= 2023–24 FC Groningen season =

FC Groningen
2023–24 season
- Head coach: Dick Lukkien
- Stadium: Euroborg
- Eerste Divisie: 2nd (promoted)
- KNVB Cup: Semi-final
- Top goalscorer: League: Romano Postema (18); All: Romano Postema (21)
- Average home league attendance: 20,217
- Biggest win: Jong AZ 0–5 Groningen
- Biggest defeat: Groningen 0–3 FC Den Bosch
Home colours

The 2023–24 season was FC Groningen's 53rd season in existence and their first one back in the Eerste Divisie since 2000 after enduring a disastrous campaign the previous season. They also competed in the KNVB Cup.

Under coach Dick Lukkien, Groningen finished as runners-up and won promotion back to the Eredivisie with a squad composed of many players who were recruited from Groningen's youth academy; the team defeated direct rivals Roda JC 2–0 on the last matchday to take second place from them. Groningen also reached the semi-final of the KNVB Cup for the first time since 2015.

== Players ==
=== First-team squad ===
Note: Flags indicate national team as defined under FIFA eligibility rules; some limited exceptions apply. Players may hold more than one non-FIFA nationality.

No.	Pos.	Nation	Player
4	MF	NED	Joey Pelupessy
5	DF	GER	Marco Rente
6	MF	CPV	Laros Duarte
7	MF	NOR	Johan Hove
8	MF	CUW	Leandro Bacuna (captain)
14	MF	NED	Jorg Schreuders
15	DF	NED	Nick Bakker
17	FW	NOR	Kristian Strømland Lien
18	DF	NOR	Isak Dybvik Määttä
19	DF	NED	Liam van Gelderen
20	DF	NED	Thijmen Blokzijl
21	GK	NED	Hidde Jurjus
22	FW	FRA	Noam Emeran

No.	Pos.	Nation	Player
24	DF	NED	Nordin Musampa
25	FW	NED	Thom van Bergen
26	DF	NED	Daniël Beukers
27	FW	POR	Rui Mendes
29	FW	NED	Romano Postema
38	FW	NED	Kian Slor
40	MF	ITA	Luciano Valente
42	FW	NED	Fofin Turay
43	DF	BEL	Marvin Peersman
44	GK	NED	Jasper Meijster
45	GK	NED	Dirk Baron
47	MF	NED	Tika de Jonge
50	DF	NED	Wouter Prins

== Transfers ==
=== In ===
Pos.	Player	Transferred from	Fee	Date	Source
DF	(Netherlands) Daniël Beukers	(Netherlands) Jong AZ			
GK	(Netherlands) Hidde Jurjus	(Netherlands) De Graafschap			
FW	(Netherlands) Kevin van Veen	(Scotland) Motherwell	€586,000	1 July 2023	
MF	(Norway) Kristian Strømland Lien	(Norway) Mjøndalen IF Fotball			
MF	(Curaçao) Leandro Bacuna	(England) Watford F.C.			
DF	(Germany) Marco Rente	(Netherlands) Heracles Almelo	€630,000	1 July 2023	
DF	(Netherlands) Marvin Peersman	(Greece) Aris Thessaloniki F.C.			
FW	(France) Noam Emeran	(England) Manchester United U21	Undisclosed	24 August 2023	
FW	(Portugal) Rui Mendes	(Netherlands) FC Emmen	€300,000	24 January 2024	

=== Out ===
Pos.	Player	Transferred to	Fee	Date	Source
MF	(Sweden) Aimar Sher	(Italy) Spezia Calcio	End of loan	30 June 2023	
DF	(Suriname) Damil Dankerlui	(Greece) Panserraikos F.C.	Free	6 July 2023	
FW	(Netherlands) Elvis Manu	(Bulgaria) Botev Plovdiv	End of loan	30 June 2023	
FW	(Germany) Florian Krüger	(Germany) Eintracht Braunschweig	Loan	29 August 2023	
GK	(Netherlands) Jan de Boer	(Netherlands) VVV-Venlo			
DF	(Netherlands) Jetro Willems	(Netherlands) Heracles Almelo	Free	1 July 2023	
MF	(Netherlands) Kevin van Veen	(Scotland) Kilmarnock F.C.	On loan	1 February 2024	
DF	(Croatia) Marin Šverko	(Italy) Venezia FC	€250,000	7 July 2023	
DF	(Denmark) Mads Bech Sørensen	(England) Brentford F.C.	End of loan	30 June 2023	
DF	(Czech Republic) Matěj Chaluš	(Sweden) Malmö FF	End of loan	30 June 2023	
GK	(Netherlands) Michael Verrips	(Netherlands) Fortuna Sittard	End of loan	12 January 2024	
MF	(Finland) Oliver Antman	(Denmark) FC Nordsjælland	End of loan	30 June 2023	
GK	(Netherlands) Peter Leeuwenburgh	(Cyprus) Apollon Limassol	Free	12 August 2023	
DF	(Netherlands) Radinio Balker	(England) Huddersfield Town A.F.C.	€1,300,000	18 January 2024	
MF	(Netherlands) Ragnar Oratmangoen	(Netherlands) Fortuna Sittard	Loan	1 September 2023	
FW	(United States) Ricardo Pepi	(Germany) FC Augsburg	End of loan	30 June 2023	
MF	(Slovakia) Tomáš Suslov	(Italy) Hellas Verona	Loan	1 September 2023	
DF	(Sweden) Yahya Kalley	(Sweden) IFK Norrköping	Undisclosed	8 July 2023	

== Pre-season and friendlies ==
Win Draw Loss

5 July 2023 Friendly	VV Annen (Netherlands)	0–2	(Netherlands) Groningen	Annen, Netherlands
15:00		Report	Van Veen 16'; Irandust 20'	Attendance: 2,500

8 July 2023 Friendly	VV Onstwedder Boys (Netherlands)	0–11	(Netherlands) Groningen	Onstwedde, Netherlands
15:00		Report	Irandust 2'; Blokzijl; Krüger; Van Gelderen; Valente; Postema; Slor; Van Bergen	Stadium: Sportpark de Boskamp; Attendance: 1,900

12 July 2023 Friendly	Go Ahead Eagles (Netherlands)	1–3	(Netherlands) Groningen

15 July 2023 Friendly	Groningen (Netherlands)	5–2	(Belgium) Deinze	Epe, Netherlands
17:30	Van Veen 17'; Blokzijl 46'; Van Kaam 65'; Van Bergen 70'; Postema 118'	Report	Ferdinand 36', 42'	Stadium: Sportcomplex Ericaweg
Note: Two periods of 60 minutes.

21 July 2023 Friendly	Hibernian (Scotland)	2–1	(Netherlands) Groningen	Edinburgh, Scotland
21:15 UTC+1	Campbell 54', 56'		Van Veen 10'	Stadium: Easter Road; Attendance: 9,113; Referee: Willie Collum (Scotland)

28 July 2023 Friendly	Groningen (Netherlands)	1–0	(Netherlands) De Graafschap	Middelstum, Netherlands
16:30	Postema 55'		Van Riel (red card) 75'	Stadium: Sportpark Middelstum

29 July 2023 Friendly	Groningen (Netherlands)	1–1	(Netherlands) Emmen	Rolde, Netherlands
15:00	Oratmangoen 39'		Parzyszek 8'	Stadium: Sportpark Boerbos

5 August 2023 Friendly	PEC Zwolle (Netherlands)	0–0	(Netherlands) Groningen	Zwolle, Netherlands
16:00				Stadium: MAC³PARK Stadion

6 September 2023 Friendly	Groningen (Netherlands)	1-0	(Netherlands) SC Heerenveen

11 October 2023 Friendly	Groningen (Netherlands)	1–1	(Netherlands) Almere City	Groningen, Netherlands
16:00				Stadium: Euroborg

15 November 2023 Friendly	SC Heerenveen (Netherlands)	1–3	(Netherlands) Groningen

6 January 2024 Friendly	VfL Bochum (Germany)	2-1	(Netherlands) Groningen

9 January 2024 Friendly	Groningen (Netherlands)	0-3	(Netherlands) PEC Zwolle

21 March 2024 Friendly	Heracles Almelo (Netherlands)	4-1	(Netherlands) Groningen

== Competitions ==
=== Overall record ===
Competition	First match	Last match	Starting round	Final position	Record							
Competition	First match	Last match	Starting round	Final position	Pld	W	D	L	GF	GA	GD	Win %
Eerste Divisie	11 August 2023	10 May 2024	Matchday 1	2nd	38	22	9	7	71	30	+41	57.89
KNVB Cup	1 November 2023	29 February 2024	First round	Semi-finals	5	3	1	1	7	3	+4	60.00
Total					43	25	10	8	78	33	+45	58.14

Source: Soccerway

=== Eerste Divisie ===
==== League table ====
Pos	Team	Pld	W	D	L	GF	GA	GD	Pts	Promotion or qualification
1	Willem II (Note: Winner of the Second Period (Rounds 10–19)) (C, P)	38	23	10	5	77	35	+42	79	Promotion to the Eredivisie
2	Groningen (Note: Winner of the Third and Fourth Period (Rounds 20–29 and 30–38)) (P)	38	22	9	7	71	30	+41	75	Promotion to the Eredivisie
3	Roda JC Kerkrade (Note: Winner of the First Period (Rounds 1–9))	38	21	12	5	69	34	+35	75	Qualification for promotion play-offs
4	Dordrecht	38	18	15	5	74	51	+23	69	Qualification for promotion play-offs
5	ADO Den Haag	38	17	12	9	72	50	+22	63	Qualification for promotion play-offs

Source: Flashscore, Keuken Kampioen Divisie (in Dutch)
Rules for classification: Season in progress: 1) Most points won; 2) Less points lost; 3) Goal difference; 4) Goals scored; 5) Alphabetical order; End of season: 1) Points; 2) Goal difference; 3) Goals scored; 4) Head-to-head points; 5) Head-to-head goal difference; 6) Head-to-head away goals scored; 7) Play-off if relevant for deciding champion, relegation or participating in a European league, otherwise by draw. 8) Penalty shoot-out (only after a play-off)
(C) Champions; (P) Promoted

==== Results summary ====
Overall								Home						Away					
Pld	W	D	L	GF	GA	GD	Pts	W	D	L	GF	GA	GD	W	D	L	GF	GA	GD
38	22	9	7	71	30	+41	75	12	5	2	38	14	+24	10	4	5	33	16	+17

==== Results by round ====
Round	1	2	3	4	5	6	7	8	9	10	11	12	13	14	15	16	17	18	19	20	21	22	23	24	25	26	27	28	29	30	31	32	33	34	35	36	37	38
Ground	H	A	H	A	H	H	A	H	A	A	A	A	H	A	A	H	H	H	A	H	A	A	H	A	H	A	H	A	H	A	H	A	A	H	H	A	A	H
Result	W	L	D	W	W	L	W	L	L	L	L	L	D	D	W	W	W	W	D	W	W		W	L	W	W	D	W	W	W	W	W	W	D	W	D	D	W
Position	1	6	8	3	2	5	3	8	11	13	12	13	13	14	13	11	9	8	9	9	9		6	6														2

A = Away; H = Home; W = Win; D = Draw; L = Loss

==== Matches ====
The league fixtures were unveiled on 30 June 2023.

===== 1st half =====
11 August 2023 1	Groningen	4–1	Jong Ajax	Groningen
20:00 CEST (UTC+2)	Rente 32'; Postema 55'; Suslov 72'; Peersman (yellow card) 84'; Balker (yellow card) 86'; Hove 90+5'	Report	Hlynsson (yellow card) 24'; Rasmussen 84'; Gooijer (yellow card) 84'	Stadium: Euroborg; Attendance: 20,502; Referee: Martijn Vos

21 August 2023 2	Jong Utrecht	1–0	Groningen	Utrecht
20:00 CEST (UTC+2)	Rijks 38'	Report	Määttä (yellow card) 81'	Stadium: Stadion Galgenwaard; Attendance: 1,030; Referee: Clay Ruperti

27 August 2023 3	Groningen	0–0	Willem II	Groningen
14:30 CEST (UTC+2)	Rente (yellow card) 59'; Bacuna (yellow card) 90+1'	Report	Bokila (yellow card) 43'; Bosch (yellow card) 77'	Stadium: Euroborg; Attendance: 20,721; Referee: Sander van der Eijk

1 September 2023 4	TOP Oss	0–2	Groningen	Oss
20:00 CEST (UTC+2)	Van Eijma (yellow card) 45+6'; Van Leeuwen (yellow card) 90+7'	Report	Rente (yellow card) 24'; Van Veen 45+7', 66'	Stadium: Frans Heesen Stadion; Attendance: 2,336; Referee: Stan Teuben

15 September 2023 6	Groningen	0–1	ADO Den Haag	Groningen
20:00 CEST (UTC+2)		Report	Veerman 16'	Stadium: Euroborg; Attendance: 20,800; Referee: Serdar Gözübüyük

18 September 2023 5	Groningen	4–0	Jong PSV	Groningen
20:00 CEST (UTC+2)	Määttä 11'; Van Veen 22'; Abraham 32'; Balker 42'	Report		Stadium: Euroborg; Attendance: 18,980; Referee: Jesse Rozendal

22 September 2023 7	Helmond Sport	1–2	Groningen	Helmond
20:00 CEST (UTC+2)	Schroyen (yellow card) 62'; Kaars 87' (pen.)	Report	Hove (yellow card) 62'; Van Bergen 71'; Määttä (yellow card) 72'; Rente (red card) 86'; Liam van Gelderen 90+5', (yellow card) 90+5'	Stadium: GS Staalwerken Stadion; Attendance: 2,495; Referee: Robin Hensgens

29 September 2023 8	Groningen	0–3	Den Bosch	Groningen
20:00 CEST (UTC+2)	Valente (yellow card) 10'; Määttä (yellow card) 75'; Postema (yellow card) 87'	Report	Ogbaidze (yellow card) 43', (goal) 67'; Kostorz 52', (yellow card) 77'; Ikeshita (yellow card) 55'; Gyamfi (yellow card) 70'; Mbete (yellow card) 87'; Boumassaoudi 90+6'; Leijten (yellow card) 90+7'	Stadium: Euroborg; Attendance: 19,962; Referee: Martin Fernando Perezlindo

6 October 2023 9	NAC Breda	3–2	Groningen	Breda
20:00 CEST (UTC+2)	Boere 4'; Koscelník 44', (yellow card) 49'; Leemans (yellow card) 88'; Kemper 90+6'	Report	Van Veen 28', 75', (yellow card) 28'; Postema (yellow card) 34'; Hove (yellow card) 88'; Pelupessy (yellow card) 90+5'	Stadium: Rat Verlegh Stadion; Attendance: 18,371; Referee: Stan Teuben

20 October 2023 11	De Graafschap	2–1	Groningen	Doetinchem
20:00 CEST (UTC+2)	Colyn 14'; Kaak (yellow card) 39'; Büttner 54' (pen.); Hillen (yellow card) 81'	Report	Rente 40'	Stadium: De Vijverberg; Attendance: 11,379; Referee: Allard Lindhout

23 October 2023 10	Groningen	0–0	Emmen	Groningen
20:00 CEST (UTC+2)	Balker (yellow card) 65'	Report	Hardeveld (yellow card) 59'	Stadium: Euroborg; Attendance: 22,013; Referee: Martin van den Kerkhof

29 October 2023 12	Cambuur	2–1	Groningen	Leeuwarden
12:15 CEST (UTC+2)	Tol 8'; Balk (yellow card) 58' (goal) 83'; Breij (yellow card) 59'	Report	Wouter Prins (yellow card) 43'; Valente 55'	Stadium: Cambuur Stadion; Attendance: 10,000; Referee: Joey Kooij

5 November 2023 13	Groningen	2–2	Dordrecht	Groningen
14:30 CET (UTC+1)	Postema 10'; Peersman 69'; Rente (yellow card) 85'; Van Veen (yellow card) 87'	Report	Rene Kriwak 9' (yellow card) 89'; Schuurman 77' (yellow card) 79'; Aberkane (yellow card) 88'	Stadium: Euroborg; Attendance: 19,218; Referee: Alex Bos

12 November 2023 14	Roda JC	0–0	Groningen	Kerkrade
16:45 CET (UTC+1)	Matisse Didden (yellow card) 14'; Reith (yellow card) 83'; Ouaissa (yellow card) 90+1'	Report	Jorg Schreuders (yellow card) 61'	Stadium: Parkstad Limburg Stadion; Attendance: 11,124; Referee: Dennis Higler

24 November 2023 16	Groningen	2–1	FC Eindhoven	Groningen
20:00 CET (UTC+1)	Balker 18'; Laros Duarte 82'; Wouter Prins (yellow card) 83'; Rente (yellow card) 90'	Report	Sven Simons (yellow card) 5'; Balker 36' (o.g.); Amevor (red card) 60'; Dahlhaus (yellow card) 90+3'	Stadium: Euroburg; Attendance: 18,708; Referee: Erwin Blank

27 November 2023 15	Jong AZ	0–5	Groningen	Wijdewormer
20:00 CET (UTC+1)	Dekkers (yellow card) 42'; Mexx Meerdink (yellow card) 42'; Reverson (yellow card) 86'	Report	Jorg Schreuders 9'; Peersman (yellow card) 19'; Valente 32'; Postema 64'; Balker 66'; van Bergen 85'	Stadium: Sportcomplex Kalverhoek; Attendance: 700; Referee: Nick Smit

1 December 2023 17	Groningen	2–1	VVV-Venlo	Groningen
20:00 CET (UTC+1)	Valente (yellow card) 42'; Balker (yellow card) 56'; Laros Duarte 70'; Jorg Schreuders 73'; Postema (yellow card) 82'; Määttä (yellow card) 85'	Report	Kosidis 8' (yellow card) 71'; Ketting (yellow card) 45+4'	Stadium: Euroborg; Attendance: 18,504; Referee: Laurens Gerrets

8 December 2023 18	Groningen	2–0	Telstar	Groningen
20:00 CET (UTC+1)	Valente 6' 22'; Jorg Schreuders (yellow card) 26'; van Bergen (yellow card) 45+2'	Report	van de Loo (yellow card) 43'	Stadium: Euroborg; Attendance: 18,788; Referee: Jannick van der Laan

15 December 2023 19	MVV Maastricht	1–1	Groningen	Maastricht
20:00 CET (UTC+1)	Zeegers (yellow card) 39'; Kostons 56'; Aktaş (yellow card) 64'; Souren (yellow card) 69'	Report	Wouter Prins (yellow card) 30'; Postema 45+7'	Stadium: De Geusselt; Attendance: 5,300; Referee: Martijn Vos

22 December 2023 20	Groningen	2–1	Jong FC Utrecht	Groningen
20:00 CET (UTC+1)	Laros Duarte 61'; Postema 71'	Report	Yah (yellow card) 30'; Jesse van de Haar 38'; Wessel Kooy (yellow card) 60'; Rafik El Arguioui (yellow card) 90+2'	Stadium: Euroborg; Attendance: 18,698; Referee: Wouter Wiersma

===== 2nd half =====
22 January 2024 21	Jong Ajax	0–1	Groningen	Amsterdam
20:00 CET (UTC+1)	Kalokoh (yellow card) 60'; Nick Verschuren (yellow card) 90+2'	Report	van Bergen 17'	Stadium: Sportpark De Toekomst; Attendance: 962; Referee: Thomas Hardeman

26 January 2024 22	Groningen	4–1	Jong AZ	Groningen
20:00 CET (UTC+1)	Hove 22'; Postema 27' (pen.) 61'; van Bergen 70'	Report	Ernest Poku 14'; Kiyani Zeggen (yellow card) 27'; Dekkers (yellow card) 57'; Reverson (yellow card) 78'	Stadium: Euroborg; Attendance: 20,100; Referee: Erwin Blank

2 February 2024 23	Dordrecht	1–0	Groningen	Dordrecht
20:00 CET (UTC+1)	Bronkhorst 3'; van der Avert (yellow card) 30'	Report	Rente (yellow card) 45+1'; Valente (yellow card) 86'	Stadium: Matchoholic Stadion; Attendance: 3,249; Referee: Richard Martens

11 February 2024 24	Groningen	3–0	TOP Oss	Groningen
14:30 CET (UTC+1)	Thom van Bergen 41'; Luciano Valente 55'; Kristian Stromland Lien 87'	Report		Stadium: Euroborg; Attendance: 20,414; Referee: Martin Fernando Perezlindo

18 February 2024 25	FC Eindhoven	0–3	Groningen	Eindhoven
16:45 CET (UTC+1)		Report	Luciano Valente 20'; Laros Duarte 64' 70'	Stadium: Jan Louwers Stadion; Attendance: 3,042; Referee: Clay Ruperti

23 February 2024 26	Groningen	0–0	Helmond Sport	Groningen
20:00 CET (UTC+1)		Report		Stadium: Euroborg; Attendance: 19,791; Referee: Robin Vereijken

4 March 2024 27	FC Den Bosch	1–4	Groningen	Den Bosch
20:00	Kacper Kostorz 55'	Report	Rui Mendes 66' 75'; Romano Postema 71' 90+2'	Stadium: Stadion De Vliert; Attendance: 4,061; Referee: Bas Nijhuis

8 March 2024 28	Groningen	3–0	MVV Maastricht	Groningen
20:00	Romano Postema 10' 21' 53'	Report		Stadium: Euroborg; Attendance: 19,452; Referee: Sander Van Der Eijk

11 March 2024 29	Jong PSV	2–3	Groningen	Eindhoven
20:00	Dantaye Gilbert 46'; Jesper Uneken 90'	Report	Johan Hove 20'; Mylian Jimenez 65' (o.g.); Marvin Peersman 90+4'	Stadium: De Herdgang; Attendance: 603; Referee: Nick Smit

15 March 2024 30	Groningen	4–2	De Graafschap	Groningen
20:00	Romano Postema 6' 16' 90+5'; Luciano Valente 56'	Report	Ralf Seuntjens 23' 33'	Stadium: Euroborg; Attendance: 21,111; Referee: Ingmar Oostrom

29 March 2024 31	ADO Den Haag	0-2	Groningen	Den Haag
20:00		Report	Romano Postema 18'; Thom van Bergen 65'	Stadium: Bingoal Stadion; Attendance: 11,045; Referee: Marc Nagtegaal

1 April 2024 32	FC Emmen	0-3	Groningen	Emmen
14:30		Report	Thom van Bergen 13'; Leandro Bacuna 18'; Romano Postema 62'	Stadium: De Oude Meerdijk; Attendance: 8,309; Referee: Martijn Vos

7 April 2024 33	Groningen	1–1	NAC Breda	Groningen
12:15	Johan Hove 66'	Report	Manel Royo 49'	Stadium: Euroborg; Attendance: 21,853; Referee: Jannick Van Der Laan

14 April 2024 34	VVV-Venlo	0-1	Groningen	Venlo
16:45		Report	Jorg Schreuders 78'	Stadium: De Koel; Attendance: 6,612; Referee: Martin van den Kerkhof

20 April 2024 35	Groningen	3–0	SC Cambuur	Groningen
21:00	Marvin Peersman 23'; Thom van Bergen 33'; Romano Postema 84'	Report		Stadium: Euroborg; Attendance: 22,118; Referee: Erwin Blank

26 April 2024 36	Willem II	1-1	Groningen	Tilburg
20:00	Nick Doodeman 56'	Report	Jorg Schreuders 62'	Stadium: Koning Willem II Stadion; Attendance: 14,350; Referee: Rob Dieperink

3 May 2024 37	SC Telstar	1-1	Groningen	Velsen-Zuid
20:00	Zakaria Eddahchouri 1'	Report	Thom van Bergen 90+5'	Stadium: 711 Stadion; Attendance: 3,063; Referee: Richard Martens

10 May 2024 38	Groningen	2–0	Roda JC Kerkrade	Groningen
20:00	Johan Hove 39'; Jorg Schreuders 51'	Report		Stadium: Euroborg; Attendance: 22,391; Referee: Jeroen Manschot

=== KNVB Cup ===
1 November 2023 First round	Rijnsburgse Boys	0–1	Groningen	Rijnsburg
20:00 CET (UTC+1)		Report	Marvin Peersman 71'	Stadium: Sportpark Middelmors Veld 8 Attendance: 2,000; Referee: Richard Martens

19 December 2023 Second round	Willem II	1–3	Groningen	Tilburg
21:00 CET (UTC+1)	Bosch 56'; Behounek (yellow card) 60'; Schouten (yellow card) 83'	Report	Valente 21'; Peersman (yellow card) 56'; Rente (yellow card) 64'; Laros Duarte 75'; Postema 84' (pen.)	Stadium: Koning Willem II Stadion; Attendance: 7.800; Referee: Bas Nijhuis

16 January 2024 Round of 16	Excelsior	0–2	Groningen	Rotterdam
20:00 CET (UTC+1)		Report	Bacuna (yellow card) 67'; Postema 72' 78'	Stadium: Van Donge & De Roo Stadion; Attendance: 3,497; Referee: Martin van den Kerkhof

8 February 2024 Quarter-finals	Groningen	0–0 (4–3 p)	Fortuna Sittard	Groningen
20:00 CET (UTC+1)	Romano Postema (penalty scored); Nick Bakker (penalty scored); Luciano Valente (penalty missed); Johan Hove (penalty scored); Marvin Peersman (penalty scored)	Report	(penalty scored) Kristoffer Peterson; (penalty missed) Oğuzhan Özyakup; (penalty scored) Arianit Ferati; (penalty scored) Siemen Voet; (penalty missed) Mouhamed Belkheir	Stadium: Euroborg; Attendance: 21,709; Referee: Dennis Higler

29 February 2024 Semi-finals	Feyenoord	2-1	Groningen	Rotterdam
20:00	David Hancko 61'; Ondrej Lingr 83'	Report	Laros Duarte 31'	Stadium: De Kuip; Attendance: 47,500; Referee: Danny Makkelie

== Statistics ==
=== Scorers ===
#	Player	Eerste Divisie	KNVB	Total
1	(Netherlands) Romano Postema	18	3	21
2	(Netherlands) Thom van Bergen	9	0	9
3	(Netherlands) Luciano Valente	7	1	8
4	(Cape Verde) Laros Duarte	5	2	7
5	(Norway) Johan Hove	5	0	5
5	(Netherlands) Jorg Schreuders	5	0	5
5	(Netherlands) Kevin van Veen	5	0	5
8	(Belgium) Marvin Peersman	3	1	4
9	(Netherlands) Radinio Balker	3	0	3
10	(Germany) Marco Rente	2	0	2
10	(Portugal) Rui Mendes	2	0	2
12	(Norway) Isak Dybvik Määttä	1	0	1
12	(Norway) Kristian Lien	1	0	1
12	(Curaçao) Leandro Bacuna	1	0	1
12	(Netherlands) Liam van Gelderen	1	0	1
12	(Sweden) Paulos Abraham	1	0	1
12	(Slovakia) Tomáš Suslov	1	0	1

=== Assists ===
#	Player	Eerste Divisie	KNVB	Total
1	(Netherlands) Luciano Valente	7	1	8
2	(Netherlands) Thom van Bergen	6	1	7
3	(Norway) Johan Hove	6	0	6
3	(Curaçao) Leandro Bacuna	6	0	6
3	(Belgium) Marvin Peersman	6	0	6
6	(Netherlands) Jorg Schreuders	3	1	4
6	(Cape Verde) Laros Duarte	4	0	4
6	(Netherlands) Romano Postema	4	0	4
9	(Germany) Marco Rente	3	0	3
9	(Portugal) Rui Mendes	3	0	3
11	(Syria) Daleho Irandust	2	0	2
11	(Norway) Isak Dybvik Määttä	2	0	2
11	(Netherlands) Wouter Prins	1	1	2
14	(Netherlands) Hidde Jurjus	1	0	1
14	(France) Noam Emeran	1	0	1
14	(Sweden) Paulos Abraham	1	0	1
14	(Netherlands) Tika De Jonge	1	0	1

=== Appearances ===
#	Player	Eerste Divisie	KNVB	Total
1	(Belgium) Marvin Peersman	37	4	41
1	(Netherlands) Thom van Bergen	36	5	41
3	(Netherlands) Romano Postema	35	5	40
4	(Netherlands) Luciano Valente	34	5	39
5	(Norway) Isak Dybvik Määttä	34	4	38
5	(Norway) Johan Hove	34	4	38
5	(Curaçao) Leandro Bacuna	33	5	38
5	(Germany) Marco Rente	35	3	38
9	(Netherlands) Jorg Schreuders	29	5	34
10	(Netherlands) Hidde Jurjus	28	5	33
11	(Netherlands) Joey Pelupessy	25	4	29
12	(Cape Verde) Laros Duarte	23	3	26
12	(Netherlands) Thijmen Blokzijl	25	1	26
14	(Netherlands) Radinio Balker	19	1	20
15	(Netherlands) Fofin Turay	16	3	19
15	(Netherlands) Wouter Prins	15	4	19
17	(Portugal) Rui Mendes	15	2	17
18	(Norway) Kristian Lien	15	1	16
19	(Netherlands) Kevin van Veen	14	1	15
20	(France) Noam Emeran	12	1	13
21	(Netherlands) Tika De Jonge	9	2	11
22	(Netherlands) Michael Verrips	10	0	10
23	(Syria) Daleho Irandust	8	0	8
24	(Netherlands) Liam van Gelderen	6	1	7
24	(Netherlands) Nick Bakker	3	4	7
26	(Sweden) Paulos Abraham	6	0	6
27	(Netherlands) Kian Slor	4	0	4
28	(Netherlands) Nils Eggens	2	0	2
28	(Slovakia) Tomáš Suslov	2	0	2
30	(Netherlands) Daniël Beukers	0	1	1
30	(Netherlands) Dirk Baron	1	0	1
30	(Netherlands) Nordin Musampa	1	0	1
30	(Netherlands) Ragnar Oratmangoen	1	0	1

=== Clean sheets ===
#	Player	Eredivisie	KNVB	Total
1	(Netherlands) Hidde Jurjus	14	3	17
2	(Netherlands) Michael Verrips	3	0	3
Total		17	3	20

=== Disciplinary record ===
#	Player	Eredivisie			KNVB			Total		
#	Player	Yellow card	(yellow card) (yellow-red card)	Red card	Yellow card	(yellow card) (yellow-red card)	Red card	Yellow card	(yellow card) (yellow-red card)	Red card
1	(Germany) Marco Rente	6	0	1	1	0	0	7	0	1
2	(Netherlands) Hidde Jurjus	1	0	1	0	0	0	1	0	1
3	(Belgium) Marvin Peersman	4	0	0	3	0	0	7	0	0
4	(Norway) Isak Dybvik Määttä	6	0	0	0	0	0	6	0	0
4	(Curaçao) Leandro Bacuna	4	0	0	2	0	0	6	0	0
6	(Netherlands) Luciano Valente	4	0	0	0	0	0	4	0	0
6	(Netherlands) Romano Postema	4	0	0	0	0	0	4	0	0
6	(Netherlands) Thom van Bergen	3	0	0	1	0	0	4	0	0
6	(Netherlands) Wouter Prins	3	0	0	1	0	0	4	0	0
10	(Netherlands) Joey Pelupessy	3	0	0	0	0	0	3	0	0
10	(Netherlands) Jorg Schreuders	3	0	0	0	0	0	3	0	0
10	(Netherlands) Kevin van Veen	3	0	0	0	0	0	3	0	0
10	(Netherlands) Radinio Balker	3	0	0	0	0	0	3	0	0
14	(Norway) Johan Hove	2	0	0	0	0	0	2	0	0
14	(Cape Verde) Laros Duarte	2	0	0	0	0	0	2	0	0
16	(Netherlands) Liam van Gelderen	1	0	0	0	0	0	1	0	0
16	(France) Noam Emeran	0	0	0	1	0	0	1	0	0
16	(Portugal) Rui Mendes	1	0	0	0	0	0	1	0	0
