= 2022–23 FC Groningen season =

FC Groningen
2022–23 season
- Owner: FC Groningen Beheer B.V.
- Chairman: Erik Mulder
- Head coach: Frank Wormuth (until 14 November 2022); Dennis van der Ree (from 2 December 2022)
- Stadium: Euroborg
- Eredivisie: 18th (relegated)
- KNVB Cup: Second round
- Top goalscorer: League: Ricardo Pepi (12); All: Ricardo Pepi (13)
- Highest home attendance: 21,674 (against FC Emmen in Eredivisie)
- Lowest home attendance: 0 (Note: FC Groningen played their last two games of the season without any of their fans in attendance due to recurring issues with their supporters.)
- Average home league attendance: 16,014
- Biggest win: 3-0 (against Excelsior Rotterdam(a) in Eredivisie and against FC Dordrecht(a) in KNVB CUp)
- Biggest defeat: 6-0 (against PSV Eindhoven(a) and SBV Vitesse in Eredivisie)
Home colours
- All statistics correct as of 20 September 2024.

The 2022–23 season was the 67th in the history of FC Groningen and their 56th (23rd consecutive) season in the top flight. The club participated in Eredivisie and KNVB Cup. The team ended up relegated at the end of the season.

In the KNVB Cup, FC Groningen lost 3–2 against SV Spakenburg in the second round and are eliminated from the cup.

Ricardo Pepi was the top scorer of the club in this season with 13 goals; 12 goals in Eredivisie and 1 goal in KNVB Cup.

Isak Dybvik Määttä was the most appeared player in this season with 34 appearances; 33 appearances in Eredivisie, 1 appearance in KNVB Cup.

== Players ==
As of 22 September 2024

Note: Flags indicate national team as defined under FIFA eligibility rules; some limited exceptions apply. Players may hold more than one non-FIFA nationality.

No.	Pos.	Nation	Player
1	GK	NED	Peter Leeuwenburgh
2	DF	SUR	Damil Dankerlui
4	MF	NED	Joey Pelupessy (captain)
6	MF	NED	Laros Duarte
7	MF	SVK	Tomáš Suslov
8	MF	NOR	Johan Hove
9	FW	USA	Ricardo Pepi (on loan from FC Augsburg)
10	MF	SWE	Daleho Irandust
11	FW	SWE	Paulos Abraham
12	DF	NED	Radinio Balker
14	MF	BEL	Emmanuel Matuta
15	DF	NED	Jetro Willems
18	DF	NOR	Isak Dybvik Määttä
19	DF	NED	Liam van Gelderen
20	GK	NED	Michael Verrips (on loan from Fortuna Sittard)

No.	Pos.	Nation	Player
21	FW	FIN	Oliver Antman (on loan from Nordsjælland)
23	FW	GER	Florian Krüger
24	DF	NED	Nordin Musampa
25	GK	NED	Jan de Boer
26	FW	NED	Kian Slor
28	FW	NED	Elvis Manu (on loan from Botev Plovdiv)
29	DF	DEN	Mads Bech Sørensen (on loan from Brentford)
31	MF	SWE	Aimar Sher (on loan from Spezia)
34	FW	NED	Ragnar Oratmangoen
37	DF	CZE	Matěj Chaluš (on loan from Malmö FF)
39	MF	NED	Jorg Schreuders
40	MF	ITA	Luciano Valente
42	DF	NED	Thijmen Blokzijl
48	DF	NED	Maxim Mariani
55	FW	NED	Thom van Bergen

== Transfers ==
=== In ===
Pos.	Player	Transferred from	Fee	Date
FW	(Netherlands) Kian Slor	(Netherlands) FC Emmen	End of loan	30 Jun 2022
MF	(Sweden) Ramon Pascal Lundqvist	(Greece) Panathinaikos F.C.	End of loan	30 Jun 2022
DF	(Netherlands) Joey Pelupessy	(Turkey) Giresunspor	Free	1 Jul 2022
DF	(Suriname) Liam van Gelderen	(Netherlands) Ajax U21	€450,000	1 Jul 2022
DF	(Netherlands) Nordin Musampa	(Netherlands) Ajax U21	Free	1 Jul 2022
FW	(Indonesia) Ragnar Oratmangoen	(Netherlands) Go Ahead Eagles	Undisclosed	1 Jul 2022
DF	(Norway) Isak Dybvik Määttä	(Norway) Ålesund	€1,200,000	1 Aug 2022
FW	(Germany) Florian Krüger	(Germany) Arminia Bielefeld	€1,300,00	30 Aug 2022
FW	(United States) Ricardo Pepi	(Germany) FC Augsburg	On loan (€500,000)	31 Aug 2022
MF	(Sweden) Aimar Sher	(Italy) Spezia Calcio	On loan	17 Jan 2023
MF	(Norway) Johan Hove	(Norway) Strømsgodset Toppfotball	€1,030,000	17 Jan 2023
DF	(Denmark) Mads Bech Sørensen	(England) Brentford F.C	On loan	19 Jan 2023
DF	(Czech Republic) Matěj Chaluš	(Sweden) Malmö FF	On loan	27 Jan 2023
FW	(Netherlands) Elvis Manu	(Bulgaria) Botev Plovdiv	On loan	31 Jan 2023
FW	(Finland) Oliver Antman	(Denmark) FC Nordsjælland	On loan	31 Jan 2023

=== Out ===
Pos.	Player	Transferred to	Fee	Date
FW	(Sweden) Alex Mortensen	(Sweden) Kalmar FF	End of loan	30 Jun 2022
DF	(Netherlands) Melayro Bogarde	(Germany) TSG 1899 Hoffenheim	End of loan	30 Jun 2022
FW	(Tunisia) Sebastian Tounekti	(Norway) FK Bodø/Glimt	End of loan	30 Jun 2022
DF	(Netherlands) Bart van Hintum	(Netherlands) PEC Zwolle	Free	1 Jul 2022
DF	(Netherlands) Bjorn Meijer	(Belgium) Club Brugge KV	€6,000,000	1 Jul 2022
FW	(Morocco) Mohamed El Hankouri	(Germany) 1. FC Magdeburg	Free	1 Jul 2021
FW	(Netherlands) Michael de Leeuw	(Netherlands) Willem II	€40,000	10 Aug 2022
MF	(Netherlands) Daniël van Kaam	(Netherlands) SC Cambuur	Undisclosed	31 Aug 2022
FW	(Netherlands) Romano Postema	(Netherlands) Roda JC Kerkrade	On loan	31 Aug 2022
FW	(Norway) Jørgen Strand Larsen	(Spain) RC Celta de Vigo	€12,400,000	1 Sep 2022
FW	(Netherlands) Patrick Joosten	(Cyprus) Apollon Limassol FC	Undicslosed	1 Sep 2022
FW	(Belgium) Cyril Ngonge	(Italy) Hellas Verona FC	€550,000	19 Jan 2023
DF	(Netherlands) Neraysho Kasanwirjo	(Netherlands) Feyenoord	€2,000,000	23 Jan 2023
GK	(Netherlands) Jan Hoekstra	(Netherlands) PEC Zwolle	On loan	31 Jan 2023
DF	(Netherlands) Mike te Wierik	(Netherlands) FC Emmen	Free	1 Feb 2023
DF	(Sweden) Yahya Kalley	(Sweden) IFK Norrköping	On loan	21 Feb 2023

== Pre-season and friendlies ==
Win Draw Loss

2 July 2022 Friendly	FC Groningen (Netherlands)	2–1	(Greece) PAOK FC	Wenum-Wiesel, Netherlands
15:30 CEST (UTC+2)				Stadium: Sportpark Wiesel

9 July 2022 Friendly	Hannover 96 (Germany)	3–0	(Netherlands) FC Groningen	Hanover, Germany
14:00 CEST (UTC+2)				Stadium: 96 Das Stadion

16 July 2022 Friendly	VfL Osnabrück (Germany)	1–2	(Netherlands) FC Groningen	Osnabrück, Germany
14:00 CEST (UTC+2)				Stadium: Bremer Brücke

17 July 2022 Friendly	FC Groningen (Netherlands)	2–1	(Netherlands) FC Emmen	Rolde, Netherlands
14:00 CEST (UTC+2)				Stadium: Sportpark Boerbos

23 July 2022 Friendly	SV Werder Bremen (Germany)	6–1	(Netherlands) FC Groningen	Delmenhorst, Germany
17:00 CEST (UTC+2)				Stadium: Stadion an der Düsternortstraße

24 July 2022 Friendly	Blau-Weiß Lohne (Germany)	1–3	(Netherlands) FC Groningen	Lohne, Germany
13:00 CEST (UTC+2)				Stadium: Heinz-Dettmer-Stadion

30 July 2022 Friendly	FC Groningen (Netherlands)	2–1	(Spain) CA Osasuna	Groningen, Netherlands
16:00 CEST (UTC+2)	Ngonge 6'; Lundqvist 23'	Report	Ibáñez 55'	Stadium: Euroborg; Attendance: 4,561; Referee: Rob Dieperink

9 December 2022 Friendly	FC Groningen (Netherlands)	1–1	(Netherlands) SC Cambuur	Groningen, Netherlands
13:00 CET (UTC+1)				Stadium: Sportpark Corpus den Hoorn

17 December 2022 Friendly	FC Metz (France)	2–3	(Netherlands) FC Groningen	Murcia, Spain
11:00 CET (UTC+1)		Report
Note: Played over two periods of 60 minutes.

20 December 2022 Friendly	Spezia Calcio (Italy)	2–0	(Netherlands) FC Groningen	Benidorm, Spain
15:00 CET (UTC+1)		Report

23 December 2022 Friendly	FC Utrecht (Netherlands)	0–3	(Netherlands) FC Groningen	Spain
13:00 CET (UTC+1)

== Competitions ==
=== Overall record ===
Competition	First match	Last match	Starting round	Final position	Record							
Competition	First match	Last match	Starting round	Final position	Pld	W	D	L	GF	GA	GD	Win %
Eredivisie	6 August 2022	28 May 2023	Matchday 1	18th	34	4	6	24	31	75	−44	11.76
KNVB Cup	19 October 2022	12 January 2023	First round	Second round	2	1	0	1	5	3	+2	50.00
Total					36	5	6	25	36	78	−42	13.89

Source: Soccerway

=== Eredivisie ===
==== League table ====
Pos	Team	Pld	W	D	L	GF	GA	GD	Pts	Qualification or relegation
14	Volendam	34	10	6	18	42	71	−29	36	
15	Excelsior	34	9	5	20	32	71	−39	32	
16	Emmen (R)	34	6	10	18	33	65	−32	28	Qualification to Relegation play-offs
17	Cambuur (R)	34	5	4	25	26	69	−43	19	Relegation to Eerste Divisie
18	Groningen (R)	34	4	6	24	31	75	−44	18	Relegation to Eerste Divisie

Source: Eredivisie
Rules for classification: Season in progress: 1) Most points won; 2) Less points lost; 3) Goal difference; 4) Goals scored; 5) Alphabetical order; End of season: 1) Points; 2) Goal difference; 3) Goals scored; 4) Head-to-head points; 5) Head-to-head goal difference; 6) Head-to-head away goals scored; 7) Play-off if relevant for deciding champion, relegation or participating in a European league, otherwise by draw. 8) Penalty shoot-out (only after a play-off)
(R) Relegated

==== Results summary ====
Overall								Home						Away					
Pld	W	D	L	GF	GA	GD	Pts	W	D	L	GF	GA	GD	W	D	L	GF	GA	GD
34	4	6	24	31	75	−44	18	3	3	11	20	34	−14	1	3	13	11	41	−30

Last updated: 28 May 2023.
Source: Eredivisie

==== Results by round ====
Round	1	2	3	4	5	6	7	8	9	10	11	12	13	14	15	16	17	18	19	20	21	22	23	24	25	26	27	28	29	30	31	32	33	34
Ground	H	A	H	A	H	A	A	H	H	A	H	A	A	H	A	H	A	H	A	H	A	H	H	A	A	H	A	H	A	H	A	H	A	H
Result	D	L	W	D	L	W	L	L	L	L	W	D	L	L	L	L	L	L	L	D	L	D	W	L	L	L	L	L	L	L	D	L	L	L
Position	7	15	11	9	12	9	12	12	15	16	14	13	14	15	15	15	15	18	18	17	17	17	17	18	18	18	18	18	18	18	18	18	18	18

Updated to match(es) played on 28 May 2023. Source: Eredivisie
A = Away; H = Home; W = Win; D = Draw; L = Loss

==== Matches ====
The league fixtures were announced on 17 June 2022.

===== 1st half =====
7 August 2022 Week 1	FC Groningen	2–2	Volendam	Groningen
12:15 CEST (UTC+2)	Ngonge 2'; Larsen 34'	Report	Van Mieghem 38'; Benamar 68', (yellow card) 83'	Stadium: Euroborg; Attendance: 18,648; Referee: Joey Kooij

14 August 2022 Week 2	Ajax	6–1	FC Groningen	Amsterdam
14:30 CEST (UTC+2)	Bergwijn 4', 45', 67'; Antony 28'; Tadić (yellow card) 30'; K. Taylor 66'; Berghuis 88' (pen.)	Report	Ngonge 10'	Stadium: Johan Cruijff ArenA; Attendance: 54,060; Referee: Bas Nijhuis

21 August 2022 Week 3	FC Groningen	1–0	Go Ahead Eagles	Groningen
12:15 CEST (UTC+2)	De Lange 3' (o.g.) te Wierik (yellow card) 7'; Kalley (yellow card) 90+1'	Report	Fontán (yellow card) 90'; Rommens (yellow card) 90+4'	Stadium: Euroborg; Attendance: 18,575; Referee: Pol van Boekel

26 August 2022 Week 4	NEC	1–1	FC Groningen	Nijmegen
20:00 CEST (UTC+2)	Tannane (yellow card) 63'; Cissoko 88'; Tavşan (yellow card) 90+3'	Report	Suslov (yellow card) 58'; Kasanwirjo (yellow card) 63'; Duarte 75'	Stadium: Goffertstadion; Attendance: 12,500; Referee: Allard Lindhout

26 August 2022 Week 5	FC Groningen	0–1	SBV Vitesse	Groningen
16:45 CEST (UTC+2)	Valente (yellow card) 79'	Report	Bero 77'; Flamingo (yellow card) 82'; Arcus (yellow card) 90+1'	Stadium: Euroborg; Attendance: 18,014; Referee: Serdar Gözübüyük

11 September 2022 Week 6	SC Cambuur	0–1	FC Groningen	Leeuwarden
14:30 CEST (UTC+2)	Balk (yellow card) 18'; Breij (yellow card) 75'	Report	Suslov (yellow card) 64' (goal) 71'; Šverko (yellow card) 75'; Dankerlui (yellow card) 90'; Irandust (yellow card) 90+6'	Stadium: Cambuur Stadion; Attendance: 10,000; Referee: Dennis Higler

17 September 2022 Week 7	Sparta Rotterdam	2–1	FC Groningen	Rotterdam
16:30 CEST (UTC+2)	Mijnans 73' van Crooij 90' (pen.)	Report	Balker (yellow card) 28'; Pepi 61'; Šverko (yellow card) 79'; Verrips (yellow card) 84'	Stadium: Het Kasteel; Attendance: 9,657; Referee: Danny Makkelie

1 October 2022 Week 8	FC Groningen	1–4	AZ Alkmaar	Groningen
18:45	Pepi 42'; Pelupessy (yellow card) 80'	Report	de Wit 3'; Karlsson 19'; Kerkez 61', (yellow card) 84'; Lahdo 85'	Stadium: Euroborg; Attendance: 18,890; Referee: Jeroen Manschot

7 October 2022 Week 9	FC Groningen	2–3	RKC Waalwijk	Groningen
20:00	Pepi 14' (pen.), 76' te Wierik (yellow card) 35'; Balker (red card) 36'	Report	Van den Buijs 38' (pen.); Biereth 61', 80', (yellow card) 83'; Oukili (yellow card) 83'	Stadium: Euroborg; Attendance: 18,835; Referee: Martin van den Kerkhof

16 October 2022 Week 10	FC Twente	3–0	FC Groningen	Enschede
14:30 CEST (UTC+2)	Misidjan (yellow card) 26', (goal) 48'; Brenet 55' van Wolfswinkel 84'	Report	Kalley (yellow card) 88' te Wierik (yellow card) 90+1'	Stadium: De Grolsch Veste; Attendance: 29,000; Referee: Allard Lindhout

23 October 2022 Week 11	FC Groningen	4–2	PSV	Groningen
14:30 CEST (UTC+2)	Pepi 39'; Balker 43'; Ngonge 45+1'; Pelupessy 90+2'	Report	Sangaré 45+3'; Til 76'	Stadium: Euroborg; Attendance: 21,333; Referee: Dennis Higler

30 October 2022 Week 12	FC Emmen	0–0	FC Groningen	Emmen
12:15 CET (UTC+1)	Vlak (yellow card) 66'	Report	Kasanwirjo (yellow card) 90+7'	Stadium: De Oude Meerdijk; Attendance: 8,225; Referee: Danny Makkelie

6 November 2022 Week 13	FC Utrecht	2–1	FC Groningen	Utrecht
12:15 CET (UTC+1)	Klaiber (yellow card) 45+1'; Booth 26', (yellow card) 79'; Sagnan (yellow card) 67' van de Streek 84'	Report	Krüger 40'; Valente (yellow card) 45+1'	Stadium: Stadion Galgenwaard; Attendance: 19,904; Referee: Edwin van de Graaf

13 November 2022 Week 14	FC Groningen	2–3	Fortuna Sittard	Groningen
14:30 CET (UTC+1)	Pepi 45'; Balker (yellow card) 49' te Wierik (yellow card) 89'; *Krüger 90+1'	Report	Córdoba (yellow card) 17'; Embaló (yellow card) 72'; Paul Gladon 78', 84'; *Noslin 90+5'	Stadium: Euroborg; Attendance: 21,023; Referee: Marc Nagtegaal

===== 2nd half =====
8 January 2023 Week 15	Excelsior Rotterdam	1–0	FC Groningen	Rotterdam
16:45 CET (UTC+1)	Azarkan (yellow card) 37'; Driouech (yellow card) 59'; El Yaakoubi 69'	=https://www.espn.nl/voetbal/wedstrijd/_/wedstrijdId/637329/fc-groningen-excelsior	van Gelderen (yellow card) 40'; Suslov (yellow card) 61'; Määttä (yellow card) 81'	Stadium: Van Donge & De Roo Stadion; Attendance: 4,400; Referee: Erwin Blank

15 January 2023 Week 16	FC Groningen	0–3	Feyenoord	Groningen
16:45 CET (UTC+1)	Valente (yellow card) 66'	Report	Paixão 19'; Kökçü 30'; Giménez 90+1'	Stadium: Euroborg; Attendance: 20,589; Referee: Jeroen Manschot

22 January 2023 Week 17	SC Heerenveen	3–1	FC Groningen	Heerenveen
12:15 CET (UTC+1)	Sarr 5', 82' van Amersfoort 81'	Report	Krüger 40' van Gelderen (yellow card) 66'; Sørensen (yellow card) 72'; Suslov (yellow card) 76'	Stadium: Abe Lenstra Stadion; Attendance: 19,029; Referee: Allard Lindhout

26 January 2023 Week 18	FC Groningen	0–1	SC Cambuur	Groningen
18:45 CET (UTC+1)	Sher (yellow card) 89' van Bergen (yellow card) 89'; Lundqvist (yellow card) 90+3'	Report	van Kaam 77'	Stadium: Euroborg; Attendance: 18,918; Referee: Bas Nijhuis

29 January 2023 Week 19	FC Volendam	3–2	FC Groningen	Volendam
14:30 CET (UTC+1)	Oristanio 21'; Twigt 55'; Mühren 78'	Report	Hove 50'; Määttä (yellow card) 70'; Pepi 73'	Stadium: Kras Stadion; Attendance: 6.600; Referee: Martin van den Kerkhof

5 February 2023 Week 20	FC Groningen	1–1	FC Twente	Groningen
16:45 CET (UTC+1)	Antman 68'	Report	Steijn 5', (yellow card) 31'	Stadium: Euroborg; Attendance: 20,355; Referee: Pol van Boekel

11 February 2023 Week 21	PSV Eindhoven	6–0	FC Groningen	Eindhoven
20:00CET (UTC+1)	de Jong 27'; Simons 46'; Branthwaite 69'; Bakayoko 73'; Fábio Silva 84'; Til 88'	Report		Stadium: Philips Stadion; Attendance: 32,198; Referee: Dennis Higler

18 February 2023 Week 22	FC Groningen	1–1	FC Emmen	Groningen
18:45 CET (UTC+1)	Pepi 12'; Oratmangoen (yellow card) 68'	Report	Araujo 14' te Wierik (yellow card) 41' (yellow-red card) 73'; Bernadou (yellow card) 83'; Vlak (yellow card) 90+2'	Stadium: Euroborg; Attendance: 21,674; Referee: Serdar Gözübüyük

25 February 2023 Week 23	FC Groningen	3–0	Excelsior Rotterdam	Groningen
16:30 CET (UTC+1)	Hove 13'; Pepi 50' van Gelderen 66'	Report		Stadium: Euroborg; Attendance: 20,140; Referee: Danny Makkelie

4 March 2023 Week 24	Feyenoord	1–0	FC Groningen	Rotterdam
20:00 CET (UTC+1)	Pedersen (yellow card) 10'; Idrissi 88'	Report	Määttä (yellow card) 45+2' (yellow-red card) 52'; Dankerlui (yellow card) 67' van Gelderen (yellow card) 74'	Stadium: De Kuip; Attendance: 47,500; Referee: Joey Kooij

11 March 2023 Week 25	AZ Alkmaar	1–0	FC Groningen	Alkmaar
20:00 CET (UTC+1)	Karlsson 4'	Report	van Gelderen (yellow card) 57'	Stadium: AFAS Stadion; Attendance: 16,526; Referee: Pol van Boekel

19 March 2023 Week 26	FC Groningen	0–2	SC Heerenveen	Groningen
12:15 CET (UTC+1)		Report	Haye (yellow card) 15' van Hooijdonk 27' 40'	Stadium: Euroborg; Attendance: 21,247; Referee: Serdar Gözübüyük

2 April 2023 Week 27	Fortuna Sittard	3–1	FC Groningen	Sittard
16:45 CET (UTC+1)	Iñigo Córdoba 3' 44'; Noslin (yellow card) 13'; Gladon 90+3'	Report	Pepi 76'	Stadium: Fortuna Sittard Stadion; Attendance: 10,759; Referee: Martin van den Kerkhof

7 April 2023 Week 28	FC Groningen	1–2	FC Utrecht	Groningen
20:00 CET (UTC+1)	Oliver Antman 45+10'	Report	Anastasios Douvikas 45+7'; Bas Dost 76'	Stadium: Euroborg; Attendance: 21,659; Referee: Jeroen Manschot

15 April 2023 Week 29	RKC Waalwijk	2–1	FC Groningen	Waalwijk
18:45 CET (UTC+1)	Michiel Kramer 64' 86' (pen.)	Report	Ricardo Pepi 67'	Stadium: Mandemakers Stadion; Attendance: 6,738; Referee: Sander Van Der Eijk

22 April 2023 Week 30	FC Groningen	0–1	NEC	Groningen
20:00 CET (UTC+1)		Report	Jordy Bruijn 84' (pen.)	Stadium: Euroborg; Attendance: 0 (Note: The remainder of the game between FC Groningen and N.E.C. ended 0-1. The match was stopped in the eighteenth minute with the score tied, after a Groningen supporter threw a cup of liquid at the linesman.); Referee: Richard Martens

7 May 2023 Week 31	Go Ahead Eagles	1–1	FC Groningen	Deventer
14:30 CET (UTC+1)	Willum Þór Willumsson 30'	Report	Ricardo Pepi 6'	Stadium: De Adelaarshorst; Attendance: 9,711; Referee: Jochem Kamphuis

14 May 2023 Week 32	FC Groningen	2–3	Ajax	Groningen
14:30 CET (UTC+1)	Florian Krüger 39'; Laros Duarte 87'	Report	Dušan Tadić 19' (pen.); Brian Brobbey 68'; Jurriën Timber 81'	Stadium: Euroborg; Attendance: 0 (Note: FC Groningen played their last two games of the season without any of their fans in attendance due to recurring issues with their supporters.); Referee: Jeroen Manschot

21 May 2023 Week 33	SBV Vitesse	6–0	FC Groningen	Arnhem
14:30 CET (UTC+1)	Million Manhoef 4' 56' 74'; Melle Meulensteen 45+3'; Gabriel Vidović 71'; Sondre Tronstad 84'	Report		Stadium: GelreDome; Attendance: 16,182; Referee: Joey Kooij

28 May 2023 Week 34	FC Groningen	0–5	Sparta Rotterdam	Groningen
14:30 CET (UTC+1)		Report	Jonathan de Guzmán 25'; Koki Saito 58'; Arno Verschueren 75'; Tobias Lauritsen 79'; Vito van Crooij 89' (pen.)	Stadium: Euroborg; Attendance: 0 (Note: FC Groningen played their last two games of the season without any of their fans in attendance due to recurring issues with their supporters.); Referee: Rob Dieperink

=== KNVB Cup ===
19 October 2022 First round	FC Dordrecht	0–3	FC Groningen	Dordrecht
18:45 CEST (UTC+2)	Suray (yellow card) 24'	Report	Valente (yellow card) 10'; Kasanwirjo 42', 81'; Pepi 90'	Stadium: Stadion Krommewijk; Attendance: 2,611; Referee: Edwin van de Graaf

12 January 2023 Second round	FC Groningen	2–3	SV Spakenburg	Groningen
20:00 CET (UTC+1)	Balker (yellow card) 67'; Dankerlui 77', 84'	Report	Koelewijn 10' van der Linden 32' (pen.), 69' (pen.); Werkman (yellow card) 70'; Green (yellow card) 90+5'	Stadium: Euroborg; Attendance: 8,356; Referee: Danny Makkelie

== Statistics ==
=== Scorers ===
#	Player	Eredivisie	KNVB	Total
1	(United States) Ricardo Pepi	12	1	13
2	(Germany) Florian Krüger	4	0	4
3	(Belgium) Cyril Ngonge	3	0	3
4	(Suriname) Damil Dankerlui	0	2	2
4	(Norway) Johan Hove	2	0	2
4	(Cape Verde) Laros Duarte	2	0	2
4	(Netherlands) Neraysho Kasanwirjo	0	2	2
4	(Finland) Oliver Antman	2	0	2
9	(Netherlands) Joey Pelupessy	1	0	1
9	(Norway) Jørgen Strand Larsen	1	0	1
9	(Netherlands) Liam van Gelderen	1	0	1
9	(Netherlands) Radinio Balker	1	0	1
9	(Slovakia) Tomáš Suslov	1	0	1

=== Appearances ===
#	Player	Eredivisie	KNVB	Total
1	(Norway) Isak Dybvik Määttä	33	1	34
2	(Netherlands) Radinio Balker	31	2	33
3	(United States) Ricardo Pepi	29	2	31
3	(Slovakia) Tomáš Suslov	30	1	31
5	(Cape Verde) Laros Duarte	25	0	25
5	(Netherlands) Michael Verrips	24	1	25
7	(Germany) Florian Krüger	22	1	23
8	(Italy) Luciano Valente	20	2	22
9	(Netherlands) Joey Pelupessy	19	2	21
9	(Indonesia) Ragnar Oratmangoen	19	2	21
11	(Suriname) Damil Dankerlui	18	2	20
12	(Norway) Johan Hove	18	0	18
12	(Netherlands) Liam van Gelderen	17	1	18
14	(Syria) Daleho Irandust	17	0	17
14	(Netherlands) Mike te Wierik	15	2	17
14	(Netherlands) Neraysho Kasanwirjo	15	2	17
17	(Netherlands) Thijmen Blokzijl	15	1	16
18	(Sweden) Ramon Pascal Lundqvist	13	1	14
19	(Belgium) Cyril Ngonge	12	1	13
19	(Netherlands) Thom van Bergen	12	1	13
21	(Denmark) Mads Bech Sørensen	11	0	11
21	(Finland) Oliver Antman	11	0	11
23	(Netherlands) Elvis Manu	10	0	10
24	(Sweden) Paulos Abraham	8	1	9
24	(Netherlands) Peter Leeuwenburgh	8	1	9
26	(Czech Republic) Matěj Chaluš	8	0	8
26	(Netherlands) Nordin Musampa	8	0	8
28	(Netherlands) Jetro Willems	7	0	7
29	(Sweden) Aimar Sher	6	0	6
29	(Sweden) Yahya Kalley	5	1	6
31	(Netherlands) Jorg Schreuders	5	0	5
31	(Croatia) Marin Sverko	5	0	5
33	(Netherlands) Jan de Boer	3	1	4
33	(Norway) Jørgen Strand Larsen	4	0	4
35	(Netherlands) Romano Postema	2	0	2
21	(Belgium) Emmanuel Matuta	0	1	1
21	(Netherlands) Patrick Joosten	1	0	1

=== Clean sheets ===
#	Player	Eredivisie	KNVB	Total
1	(Netherlands) Michael Verrips	3	0	3
2	(Netherlands) Peter Leeuwenburgh	1	1	2
3	(Netherlands) Jan de Boer	0	1	1
Total		4	2	6

=== Disciplinary record ===
#	Player	Eredivisie		KNVB		Total	
#	Player	Yellow card	Red card	Yellow card	Red card	Yellow card	Red card
1	(Norway) Isak Dybvik Määttä	4	1	0	0	4	1
2	(Netherlands) Radinio Balker	2	1	1	0	3	1
3	(Netherlands) Nordin Musampa	1	1	0	0	1	1
4	(Cape Verde) Laros Duarte	0	1	0	0	0	1
4	(Netherlands) Peter Leeuwenburgh	0	1	0	0	0	1
6	(Slovakia) Tomáš Suslov	6	0	0	0	6	0
7	(Italy) Luciano Valente	4	0	1	0	5	0
8	(Netherlands) Liam van Gelderen	4	0	0	0	4	0
8	(Netherlands) Mike te Wierik	4	0	0	0	4	0
10	(Suriname) Damil Dankerlui	2	0	0	0	2	0
10	(Germany) Florian Krüger	2	0	0	0	2	0
10	(Denmark) Mads Bech Sørensen	2	0	0	0	2	0
10	(Croatia) Marin Sverko	2	0	0	0	2	0
10	(Netherlands) Neraysho Kasanwirjo	2	0	0	0	2	0
10	(United States) Ricardo Pepi	2	0	0	0	2	0
10	(Sweden) Yahya Kalley	2	0	0	0	2	0
17	(Sweden) Aimar Sher	1	0	0	0	1	0
17	(Syria) Daleho Irandust	1	0	0	0	1	0
17	(Netherlands) Joey Pelupessy	1	0	0	0	1	0
17	(Norway) Johan Hove	1	0	0	0	1	0
17	(Netherlands) Jorg Schreuders	1	0	0	0	1	0
17	(Czech Republic) Matěj Chaluš	1	0	0	0	1	0
17	(Netherlands) Michael Verrips	1	0	0	0	1	0
17	(Indonesia) Ragnar Oratmangoen	1	0	0	0	1	0
17	(Sweden) Ramon Pascal Lundqvist	1	0	0	0	1	0
17	(Netherlands) Thom van Bergen	1	0	0	0	1	0
