= Fofin Turay =

Dutch footballer (born 2004)

- Turay with Telstar in 2026

Personal information
- Date of birth: 7 June 2004 (age 22)
- Place of birth: Groningen, Netherlands
- Height: 1.78 m (5 ft 10 in)
- Positions: Winger; full-back

Team information
- Current team: Telstar
- Number: 21

Youth career
- –2015: GVAV-Rapiditas
- 2015–2022: Groningen

Senior career*
| Years | Team | Apps | (Gls) |
| 2022–2026 | Groningen | 16 | (0) |
| 2022–2026 | → TOP Oss (loan) | 7 | (0) |
| 2026– | Telstar | 2 | (0) |
- * Club domestic league appearances and goals as of 1 November 2026

Fofin Turay (born 7 June 2004) is a Dutch professional footballer who plays as a left winger for Eredivisie club Telstar.

Born in Groningen to a Sierra Leonean mother and a Liberian father, Turay joined the FC Groningen academy from local club GVAV-Rapiditas in 2015. He made his professional debut in August 2023 and played 16 league matches as Groningen won promotion from the Eerste Divisie in the 2023–24 season. A serious injury sustained at the club's winter training camp ruled him out of the second half of the 2024–25 season. After a loan spell at TOP Oss, he left Groningen as a free agent in 2026 and joined Telstar after a trial.

== Early life ==
Turay was born on 7 June 2004 in Groningen. His mother is from Sierra Leone and his father from Liberia, and the two met in Groningen. He began playing football at the local amateur club GVAV-Rapiditas before moving to the FC Groningen academy in 2015. He started in the under-12 side as a centre-back and went on to play in every position except goalkeeper during his time in the academy.

== Club career ==
=== FC Groningen ===
Turay progressed through the youth teams and was playing for Groningen's under-21 side when he signed his first professional contract on 22 February 2023. The deal ran until mid-2025 with an option for a further year. Arno de Jong, the club's head of youth scouting, said Turay had developed so well in recent years that he could see the contract as a reward and as motivation to keep growing. Turay called it "a first step towards more". On 28 May 2023, he was an unused substitute for the final match of the 2022–23 season, a 5–0 home defeat to Sparta Rotterdam that closed a campaign in which Groningen had already been relegated.

Turay made his professional debut in Groningen's first match back in the second tier, starting in a 4–1 home win over Jong Ajax on 11 August 2023. He went on to play 16 league matches and three cup matches in the 2023–24 season. Groningen sealed promotion back to the Eredivisie with a win over Roda JC on the final matchday.

Turay made his Eredivisie debut on 6 October 2024, coming on for Rui Mendes in stoppage time of a 3–1 defeat away to Ajax. He suffered a serious injury at the club's training camp during the winter break and missed the entire second half of the 2024–25 season. Groningen nevertheless extended his contract by a year on 23 July 2025, to the summer of 2026 with an option for a further season. He returned to first-team training in pre-season but was not included in the matchday squad for the first four matches of the 2025–26 season.

==== Loan to TOP Oss ====
On 2 September 2025, Turay joined Eerste Divisie club TOP Oss on loan for the rest of the season. He made his debut ten days later, coming on for Luciano Slagveer in the 81st minute of a 1–1 draw away to FC Emmen, in which TOP Oss equalised deep into stoppage time. A week later, he made his first start in a 4–3 win away to FC Eindhoven and was replaced after 57 minutes. He made seven league appearances for TOP Oss, who finished the season in 16th place. His contract with Groningen expired that summer, and he left the club as a free agent.

=== Telstar ===
In June 2026, Turay went on trial at Eredivisie club Telstar, one of four Dutch players without a club whom the club tested ahead of the 2026–27 season. He played in Telstar's pre-season friendlies as a trialist and came on at half-time in a 1–0 defeat to Sparta Rotterdam on 11 July. The club later signed him as one of 15 new arrivals that summer. Turay made his Telstar debut on 30 August 2026, replacing Jelani Seedorf in the 65th minute of a 4–0 home defeat to Ajax.

== Style of play ==
Turay is a left winger. He has described himself as a technical player and has said that left winger and striker are the positions that suit him best. When he signed his first contract, he was described as a hard-working player who posed a lot of threat in one-on-one situations and used his pace to exploit the space behind opposing defences. TOP Oss technical director Linton Posthumus highlighted his speed and his runs in behind when the club signed him.

== Career statistics ==
As of match played 1 November 2026

Appearances and goals by club, season and competition
| Club | Season | League | | | KNVB Cup | | Other | | Total | |
| Club | Season | Division | Apps | Goals | Apps | Goals | Apps | Goals | Apps | Goals |
|---|---|---|---|---|---|---|---|---|---|---|
| Groningen | 2023–24 | Eerste Divisie | 16 | 0 | 3 | 0 | — | | 19 | 0 |
| Groningen | 2024–25 | Eredivisie | 0 | 0 | 0 | 0 | — | | 0 | 0 |
| Groningen | Total | | 16 | 0 | 3 | 0 | 0 | 0 | 19 | 0 |
| TOP Oss (loan) | 2025–26 | Eerste Divisie | 7 | 0 | 0 | 0 | — | | 7 | 0 |
| Telstar | 2026–27 | Eredivisie | 2 | 0 | 0 | 0 | — | | 2 | 0 |
| Career total | | | 25 | 0 | 3 | 0 | 0 | 0 | 28 | 0 |
