= Fritz Emeran =

Footballer (born 1976)

Personal information
- Full name: Fritz Emeran Nkusi
- Date of birth: 28 March 1976 (age 50)
- Place of birth: Les Abymes, Guadeloupe
- Height: 1.68 m (5 ft 6 in)
- Position: Right-back

Senior career*
Years	Team	Apps	(Gls)
1992–1993	Monaco B	1	(0)
1993–1994	Saint-Lô	27	(0)
1994–1996	Rennes B	57	(2)
1996–1997	Stade Poitevin	25	(0)
1997–1999	Saint-Denis Saint-Leu	60	(3)
1999–2000	KV Mechelen	30	(0)
2000	Genk	6	(0)
2000–2002	Fortuna Sittard	50	(1)
2002–2004	Gueugnon	64	(2)
2004–2005	FC Brussels	26	(1)
2005–2006	La Louvière	28	(1)
2006–2007	Asteras Tripolis	15	(0)
2007–2009	Levadiakos	41	(0)
2009–2010	Saint-Leu		
2010–2013	L'Entente SSG		
Total		430+	(10+)

International career
2005–2007	Rwanda	6	(0)
- * Club domestic league appearances and goals

Fritz Emeran Nkusi (born 28 March 1976) is a former professional footballer who played as a right-back. Born in Guadeloupe, he played for the Rwanda national team.

== Club career ==
Born in Les Abymes, Guadeloupe, Nkusi played for Monaco B, Saint-Lô, Rennes B, Stade Poitevin, Saint-Denis Saint-Leu, KV Mechelen, Genk, Fortuna Sittard, Gueugnon, FC Brussels, La Louvière, Asteras Tripolis, Levadiakos, Saint-Leu and L'Entente SSG.

== International career ==
Born in Guadeloupe, France, Emeran married a Rwandan woman was naturalized as a Rwandan citizen. He earned 6 caps for Rwanda between 2005 and 2007.

== Personal life ==
He is the father of the French professional footballer Noam Emeran.
