= Oliver Antman =

Finnish footballer (born 2001)

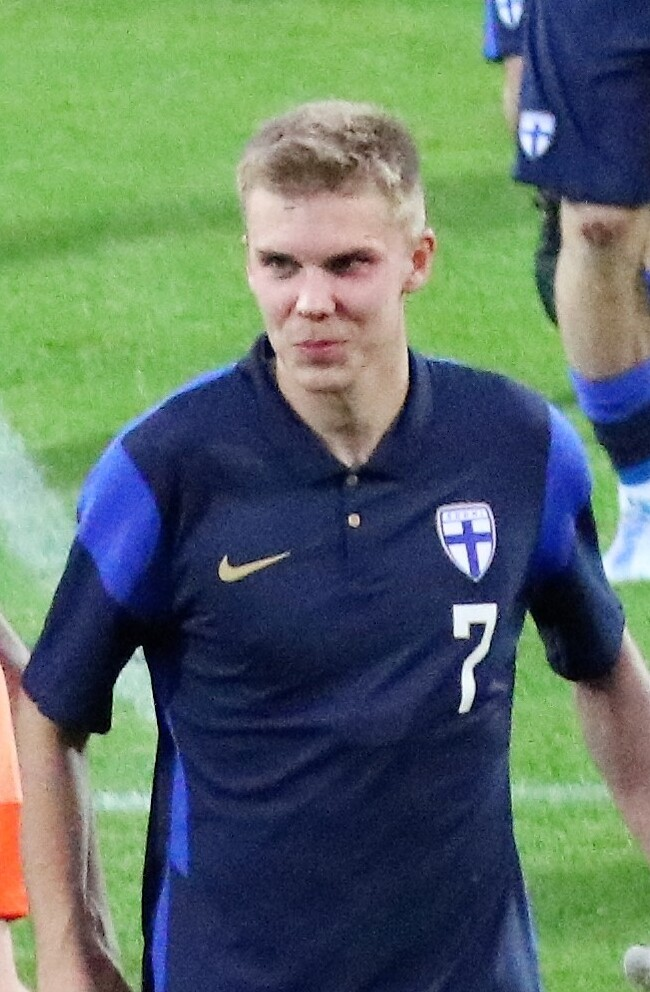
- Antman with Finland U21 in 2022

Personal information
- Date of birth: 15 August 2001 (age 25)
- Place of birth: Vantaa, Finland
- Height: 1.85 m (6 ft 1 in)
- Positions: Winger; midfielder

Team information
- Current team: Anderlecht
- Number: 11

Youth career
- KOPSE
- 2011–2013: HJK
- 2014: CF Damm
- 2015–2016: Legirus Inter

Senior career*
Years	Team	Apps	(Gls)
2017	TiPS	5	(0)
2018	Gnistan	7	(1)
2019–2024	Nordsjælland	96	(13)
2023	→ Groningen (loan)	11	(2)
2024–2025	Go Ahead Eagles	32	(6)
2025–2026	Rangers	16	(1)
2026–	Anderlecht	8	(0)

International career^{‡}
2018	Finland U17		
2019	Finland U18	2	(1)
2019	Finland U19	5	(0)
2021–2022	Finland U21	11	(2)
2022–	Finland	33	(8)
- * Club domestic league appearances and goals as of 18 October 2026 ‡ National team caps and goals as of 15 November 2026

Oliver Antman (born 15 August 2001) is a Finnish professional footballer who plays as a winger for Belgian Pro League club Anderlecht and the Finland national team.

== Youth career ==
Antman started football in his hometown Vantaa in a youth team of Korson Palloseura in Korso neighbourhood. When Antman was a child, he and his siblings were also coached by their mother. He was an attractive young talent as in 2009 it was reported that 8-year-old Antman was scouted by FC Barcelona. He played in the youth sector of HJK Helsinki in 2011–2013, where he was also coached by Miika Takkula.

In 2012, he was invited for a trial to Barcelona. He was supposed to return to the club later for a youth tournament, but the plan got cancelled by FIFA after they banned the transfers of underaged players to Barcelona. However, in 2014 he moved to Spain with his mother and played football in the youth teams of Cornellà and CF Damm for a year.

After they moved back to Finland, Antman returned to HJK. Later he played in youth teams of Vantaa-based clubs Legirus Inter and Tikkurilan Palloseura (TiPS). In TiPS, he was coached by Roberto Nuccio, whom he later followed to Gnistan.

== Club career ==
=== Gnistan ===
Antman joined IF Gnistan from Tikkurilan Palloseura in the winter 2018. Aged 16, he played 7 games for the club in third-tier Kakkonen and scored one goal on 20 June 2018, in a 1–1 draw against FC Vaajakoski.

=== Nordsjælland ===
On 27 September 2018 IF Gnistan announced, that they had sold Antman to FC Nordsjælland for an initial fee of €50,000 that could increase further. The deal was completed on the last day of the summer transfer market. Antman was the first player from Gnistan to be sold to a foreign club. Antman had earlier already been on a trial at the club and did actually also play an hour for the reserve team of Nordsjælland in May 2018, where he also scored a goal. The reserve team won the game 4-2 and won the reserve team league with that victory.

Antman's first senior experience was on 16 February 2019, where he sat on the bench for the whole game against Hobro IK in the Danish Superliga. He got his official debut for FC Nordsjælland on 30 March 2019 in the first game of newly appointed manager Flemming Pedersen. Antman started on the bench and came on the pitch replacing Mohammed Kudus with three minutes left, in a 0–0 draw against FC Midtjylland in the Danish Superliga.

In February 2019, first team manager Kasper Hjulmand revealed, that many big clubs was chasing Antman before he chose to join FC Nordsjælland. On 20 August 2019, Antman extended his contract with Nordsjælland until June 2024. Two years later, on 6 September 2022, Antman once again signed a new deal, this time until June 2025.

==== Groningen (loan) ====
On transfer deadline day, 31 January 2023, Antman joined Eredivisie side FC Groningen until the end of the season with an option to buy (if not relegated). On 5 February 2023, Antman scored in his debut for Groningen, after coming off the bench in the 65th minute of a match against FC Twente, replacing Joey Pelupessy. Antman scored Groningen's only goal, four minutes after coming on, in a match that ended 1–1. After Groningen got relegated to Eerste Divisie in the end of the season, Antman returned to Denmark.

==== Return to Nordsjælland ====
After returning to Nordsjælland, Antman was a regular part of the Danish squad and played a number of minutes at the start of the 2023–24 season. Antman was injured in an international match between Finland and Denmark in early September 2023 and was ruled out indefinitely. In mid-February 2024, Nordsjælland announced that Antman was back in training after 5 months out with an injury. He returned to the line-up after the winter break on 18 February 2024, making his first appearance in Superliga since the start of September 2023, as a late substitute in a 3–2 win over Lyngby.

=== Go Ahead Eagles ===
On 13 August 2024, Antman joined Eredivisie club Go Ahead Eagles on a three-year deal with a one-year option, for a reported transfer fee of €1.5 million, making him one of the most expensive signings in his new club's history. He became the fifth Finnish player to have signed with the Eagles, after Mikko Rahkamaa, Marco Parnela, Kari Arkivuo and Niklas Tarvajärvi.

On 25 November, he was selected in the Team of the Week by the VI football magazine for the first time. On 15 December, he scored his first goal for Go Ahead Eagles in Eredivisie, in a 3–3 away draw against Utrecht, providing also an assist for his team's third goal. After having totalled a goal and eight assists in nine consecutive games, Antman was named in the Eredivisie Team of the Week in January 2025 by the Dutch newspaper AD for the first time.

Antman scored his second goal of the season on 18 January, in a 2–1 win against his previous club Groningen. On 26 February, Antman provided the assist for the Victor Edvardsen's winning goal in a semi-final of the KNVB Cup against PSV, helping Eagles to reach for the final of the competition for the first time in 60 years since the 1964–65 edition. On 1 March, Antman scored a brace in an Eredivisie match against PSV, including a winning goal in a 3–2 home win. On 5 March, Antman was included in the Team of the Week by the EA Sports FC 25. On 9 March, he contributed to all three goals for his club, scoring a goal and providing two assists in a 3–2 away win against NEC Nijmegen. Next day Antman was named the Eredivisie Player of the Week by the ESPN Netherlands. On 7 April, he was noted again in the Team of the Weeks by VI, AD and ESPN, after assisting both of Eagles' goals in a draw against Utrecht. On 9 April, Antman was named the Eredivisie Player of the Month of March by VI.

On 21 April, Antman won the 2024–25 KNVB Cup with Go Ahead Eagles by beating AZ Alkmaar in the final, winning the club's first-ever cup title. Later Antman was included in the Eredivisie Team of the Season of EA Sports FC 25 and Opta Sports. He finished his first full season in the Eredivisie with 32 appearances, scoring six goals and providing 15 assists, which was the most in the league.

=== Rangers ===
On 4 August 2025, Antman moved to Scottish Premiership side Rangers on a four-year deal for a transfer fee of £3 million, becoming the most expensive outgoing transfer in Go Ahead Eagles' history. Less than 24 hours later after the transfer announcement, Antman made his Rangers debut as a starter in an UEFA Champions League qualifying match against Viktoria Plzeň. He helped Rangers to get a 3–0 home win by earning his team a penalty kick with his dribble and assisting the third goal. Antman scored his first goal for Rangers in a 5–1 win over Kilmarnock in the Scottish Premiership.

=== Anderlecht ===
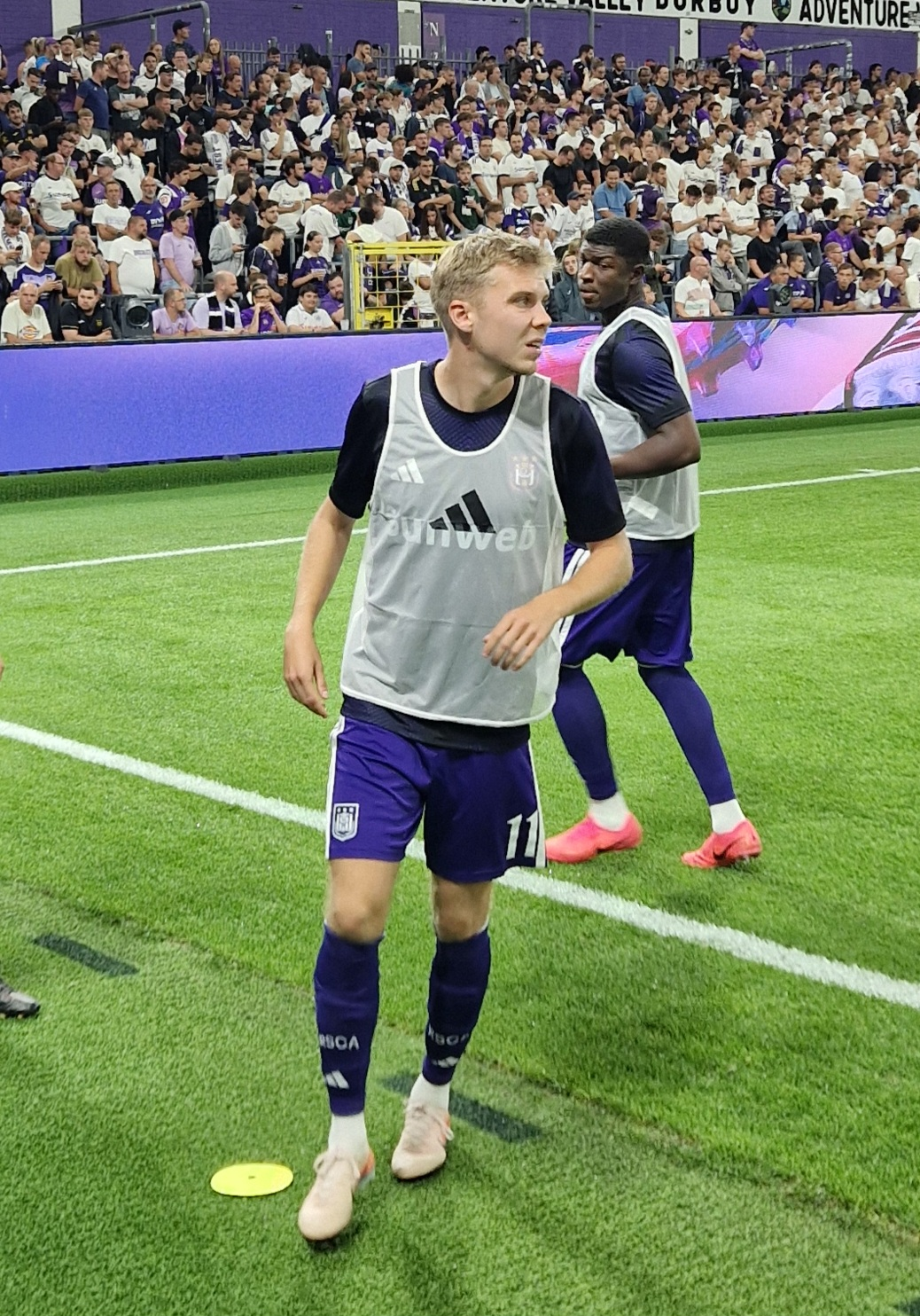
Oliver Antman, RSC Anderlecht (2026)

On 29 July 2026, Antman left Rangers to join Belgian Pro League side RSC Anderlecht for a fee of around £4.5 million.

== International career ==
Antman has played matches in Finnish U18, U19 and U21 teams. On 26 September 2022, 21-year old Antman got his debut for the Finnish national team in a 2022–23 UEFA Nations League B game against Montenegro. Antman both scored the 1-0 goal and made the assist to the goal for 2–0.

In the UEFA Euro 2024 qualifiers, Antman scored three goals in five games, including the winning goal in a 1–0 away victory against Kazakhstan. He missed the four last qualifying games due to an injury suffered in a match against Denmark. His groin was operated by surgeon Lasse Lempainen in Turku, Finland in September 2023.

== Career statistics ==
=== Club ===
As of match played 22 October 2026

Appearances and goals by club, season and competition
Club	Season	League			National cup (Note: Includes Danish Cup, KNVB Cup, Scottish Cup)		League cup (Note: Includes Scottish League Cup)		Europe		Total	
Club	Season	Division	Apps	Goals	Apps	Goals	Apps	Goals	Apps	Goals	Apps	Goals
TiPS	2017	Kolmonen	5	0	0	0	—		—		5	0
Gnistan	2018	Kakkonen	7	1	0	0	—		—		7	1
Nordsjælland	2018–19	Danish Superliga	5	0	0	0	—		—		5	0
Nordsjælland	2019–20	Danish Superliga	5	1	1	0	—		—		6	1
Nordsjælland	2020–21	Danish Superliga	19	1	2	1	—		—		21	2
Nordsjælland	2021–22	Danish Superliga	26	5	2	1	—		—		28	6
Nordsjælland	2022–23	Danish Superliga	16	2	3	1	—		—		19	3
Nordsjælland	2023–24	Danish Superliga	22	3	2	0	—		4 (Note: Appearances in UEFA Conference League)	0	28	3
Nordsjælland	2024–25	Danish Superliga	3	1	0	0	—		0	0	3	1
Nordsjælland	Total		96	13	10	3	0	0	4	0	110	16
Groningen (loan)	2022–23	Eredivisie	11	2	—		—		—		11	2
Go Ahead Eagles	2024–25	Eredivisie	32	6	4	0	—		—		36	6
Rangers	2025–26	Scottish Premiership	16	1	1	0	2	0	9 (Note: Four appearances in UEFA Champions League, five appearances in UEFA Europa League)	0	28	1
Anderlecht	2026–27	Belgian Pro League	8	0	1	0	—		6 (Note: Appearances in UEFA Europa League)	0	15	0
Career total			175	23	16	3	2	0	19	0	212	26

=== International ===
As of match played 15 November 2026

National team	Year	Competitive		Friendly		Total	
National team	Year	Apps	Goals	Apps	Goals	Apps	Goals
Finland	2022	1 (Note: Appearances in the 2022–23 UEFA Nations League B.)	1	2	1	3	2
Finland	2023	5 (Note: Appearances in the UEFA Euro 2024 qualification.)	3	0	0	5	3
Finland	2024	7 (Note: Appearances in the UEFA Euro 2024 qualification and 2024–25 UEFA Nations League B.)	0	3	1	10	1
Finland	2025	8 (Note: Appearances in the 2026 FIFA World Cup qualification.)	1	1	1	9	2
Finland	2026	2 (Note: Appearances in the 2026–27 UEFA Nations League C.)	4	0 (Note: Includes two appearances in the 2026 FIFA Series.)	0	6	0
Total		23	5	10	3	33	8

Notes

Scores and results list Finland's goal tally first, score column indicates score after each Antman goal.

List of international goals scored by Oliver Amtman
No.	Date	Venue	Cap	Opponent	Score	Result	Competition
1	26 September 2022	Podgorica City Stadium, Podgorica, Montenegro	1	Montenegro	1–0	2–0	2022–23 UEFA Nations League B
2	17 November 2022	Toše Proeski Arena, Skopje, North Macedonia	2	North Macedonia	1–0	1–1	Friendly
3	23 March 2023	Parken Stadium, Copenhagen, Denmark	4	Denmark	1–1	1–3	UEFA Euro 2024 qualifying
4	16 June 2023	Helsinki Olympic Stadium, Helsinki, Finland	5	Slovenia	2–0	2–0	UEFA Euro 2024 qualifying
5	7 September 2023	Astana Arena, Astana, Kazakhstan	7	Kazakhstan	1–0	1–0	UEFA Euro 2024 qualifying
6	7 June 2024	Hampden Park, Glasgow, Scotland	12	Scotland	2–2	2–2	Friendly
7	21 March 2025	Ta' Qali Stadium, Ta' Qali, Malta	19	Malta	1–0	1–0	2026 FIFA World Cup qualification
8	17 November 2025	Tammelan Stadion, Tampere, Finland	27	Andorra	1–0	4–0	Friendly

== Honours ==
Go Ahead Eagles

- KNVB Cup: 2024–25

Finland

- FIFA Series: 2026

Individual

- VI magazine: Eredivisie Player of the Month, March 2025
- Football Association of Finland: U21 Player of the Year 2021
- Eredivisie Team of the Month: March 2025
