= Cyril Ngonge =

Belgian footballer (born 2000)

Personal information
- Date of birth: 26 May 2000 (age 26)
- Place of birth: Uccle, Belgium
- Height: 1.77 m (5 ft 10 in)
- Positions: Winger; forward

Team information
- Current team: Monza (on loan from Napoli)
- Number: 16

Youth career
- 2006–2014: Anderlecht
- 2014–2018: Club Brugge

Senior career*
Years	Team	Apps	(Gls)
2018–2020	Club Brugge	4	(0)
2019–2020	→ Jong PSV (loan)	22	(7)
2020–2021	RKC Waalwijk	20	(5)
2021–2023	Groningen	43	(10)
2023–2024	Hellas Verona	33	(9)
2024–	Napoli	31	(1)
2025–2026	→ Torino (loan)	20	(1)
2026	→ Espanyol (loan)	9	(0)
2026–	→ Monza (loan)	0	(0)

International career^{‡}
2014–2015	Belgium U15	5	(0)
2015	Belgium U16	2	(0)
2017	Belgium U17	5	(0)
2018	Belgium U18	2	(0)
2018–2019	Belgium U19	6	(1)
2024	Belgium	1	(0)
- * Club domestic league appearances and goals as of 27 May 2026 ‡ National team caps and goals as of 10 October 2024

Cyril Ngonge (born 26 May 2000) is a Belgian professional footballer who plays as a winger or forward for Serie A club Monza, on loan from Napoli.

== Club career ==
=== Club Brugge ===
Ngonge is a youth exponent from Club Brugge. He made his senior debut on 2 December 2018 in the Belgian Pro League against Standard Liège. He replaced Emmanuel Dennis after 20 minutes.

=== Jong PSV ===
On 1 September 2019, Ngonge was loaned out to Jong PSV for the 2019–20 season. He made his debut for the club on 13 September 2019 in a 3–2 home victory against Jong AZ in the Eerste Divisie.

=== RKC Waalwijk ===
After his return, he was directly sold to Eredivisie club RKC Waalwijk. There, he developed into a starter in his first season and scored his first goal for the club in his fourth game, a 2–2 draw against Feyenoord.

=== Groningen ===
After a single season with Waalwijk Ngonge, joined fellow Eredivisie club FC Groningen where he quickly established himself as a regular starter.

=== Hellas Verona ===
On 19 January 2023, Ngonge joined Serie A club Hellas Verona. He made his debut for the club that month in Serie A in a 1–1 draw against Udinese on 30 January 2023. He registered his first goal for the club in the following week, scoring a second-half equaliser in a 1–1 home draw against Lazio.

=== Napoli ===
Ngonge signed for fellow Italian club Napoli on 19 January 2024. He made his league debut for I Partenopei on 28 January 2024, in a 0–0 away draw against Lazio.

==== Loan to Torino ====
On 24 July 2025, Ngonge joined fellow Serie A club Torino on a one-year loan for €1 million, with the option of a permanent transfer.

==== Loan to Espanyol ====
On 31 January 2026, Ngonge moved on loan to Spanish club Espanyol, with an option to buy.

==== Loan to Monza ====
On 28 August 2026, Ngonge joined Serie A club Monza on a one-year loan with an option for purchase.

== International career ==
Ngonge made his debut for the Belgium national team on 10 October 2024 in a UEFA Nations League game against Italy at Stadio Olimpico. He substituted Loïs Openda in the 87th minute of a 2–2 draw.

== Personal life ==
Ngonge's father, Michel Ngonge, was also a professional footballer and represented the DR Congo national team.

== Career statistics ==
=== Club ===
As of match played 24 January 2026

Appearances and goals by club, season and competition
Club	Season	League			National cup (Note: Includes KNVB Cup, Coppa Italia)		Europe		Other		Total	
Club	Season	Division	Apps	Goals	Apps	Goals	Apps	Goals	Apps	Goals	Apps	Goals
Club Brugge	2018–19	Belgian Pro League	4	0	0	0	1 (Note: Appearance in UEFA Champions League)	0	0	0	5	0
Jong PSV (loan)	2019–20	Eerste Divisie	22	7	–		–		–		22	7
PSV (loan)	2019–20	Eredivisie	0	0	0	0	0	0	–		0	0
RKC Waalwijk	2020–21	Eredivisie	20	5	1	0	–		–		21	5
Groningen	2021–22	Eredivisie	31	7	3	1	–		–		34	8
Groningen	2022–23	Eredivisie	12	3	1	0	–		–		13	3
Groningen	Total		43	10	4	1	–		–		47	11
Hellas Verona	2022–23	Serie A	14	3	0	0	–		1 (Note: Appearance in Serie A relegation tie-breaker)	2	15	5
Hellas Verona	2023–24	Serie A	19	6	2	0	–		–		21	6
Hellas Verona	Total		33	9	2	0	–		1	2	36	11
Napoli	2023–24	Serie A	13	1	–		1	0	0	0	14	1
Napoli	2024–25	Serie A	18	0	3	2	–		–		21	2
Napoli	Total		31	1	3	2	1	0	0	0	35	3
Torino	2025–26	Serie A	20	1	3	0	–		–		23	1
Career total			173	33	13	3	2	0	1	2	189	38

=== International ===
As of match played 10 October 2024

Appearances and goals by national team and year
National team	Year	Apps	Goals
Belgium	2024	1	0
Total		1	0

== Honours ==
Napoli

- Serie A: 2024–25

Individual

- Eredivisie Goal of the Season: 2021–22
- Serie A Goal of the Month: December 2023
