= Noam Emeran =

Rwandan footballer (born 2002)

Personal information
- Full name: Noam Fritz Emeran
- Date of birth: 24 September 2002 (age 24)
- Place of birth: Paray-le-Monial, France
- Height: 1.79 m (5 ft 10 in)
- Positions: Forward; winger

Team information
- Current team: Lausanne Ouchy
- Number: 57

Youth career
- FC Brussels
- 2011–2017: Entente SSG
- 2017–2019: Amiens
- 2019–2023: Manchester United

Senior career*
Years	Team	Apps	(Gls)
2023–2026	Groningen	20	(1)
2026	→ Emmen (loan)	11	(0)
2026–	Lausanne Ouchy	1	(0)

International career^{‡}
2017	France U16	2	(0)
2026–	Rwanda	1	(0)
- * Club domestic league appearances and goals as of 20 September 2026 ‡ National team caps and goals as of 29 September 2026

Noam Fritz Emeran (born 24 September 2002) is a professional footballer who plays as a forward or winger for Swiss Challenge League club Lausanne Ouchy. Born in France, he plays for the Rwanda.

== Club career ==
=== Early career ===
Emeran started his career with Belgian side FC Brussels, before joining the academy of Entente SSG in 2011. Following this, he spent a couple of seasons with Amiens, and reportedly attracted the attention of Barcelona, Juventus and Paris Saint-Germain. He ultimately joined English side Manchester United in February 2019, after prolonged negotiations.

=== Manchester United ===
Emeran signed his first professional contract with Manchester United in November 2019.

On 12 July 2023, he scored against Leeds United in a pre-season friendly in Norway.

=== Groningen ===
On 24 August 2023, Emeran signed a four-year contract with Groningen in the Netherlands.

==== Loan to Emmen ====
On 3 February 2026, Emeran was loaned by Emmen.

== International career ==
Emeran is eligible to represent France or Rwanda at international level. He made two appearances for France at under-16 level in 2017.

In September 2026, Emeran was called up to the Rwanda national team for AFCON qualifiers against Liberia and Cape Verde. He made his debut against Cape Verde on 29 September 2026.

== Personal life ==
Emeran was born in Paray-le-Monial, France. His mother is Rwandan and his Guadeloupean-born father, Fritz Emeran, is a former professional footballer who played internationally for Rwanda.

== Career statistics ==
As of match played 18 December 2024

Appearances and goals by club, season and competition
Club	Season	League			National cup		League cup		Europe		Other		Total	
Club	Season	Division	Apps	Goals	Apps	Goals	Apps	Goals	Apps	Goals	Apps	Goals	Apps	Goals
Manchester United U21	2021–22	—	—		—		—		—		1 (Note: Appearance(s) in the EFL Trophy)	0	1	0
Manchester United U21	2022–23	—	—		—		—		—		2	0	2	0
Manchester United U21	Total		—		—		—		—		3	0	3	0
Groningen	2023–24	Eerste Divisie	12	0	1	0	—		—		—		13	0
Groningen	2024–25	Eredivisie	2	0	1	0	—		—		—		3	0
Groningen	Total		14	0	2	0	—		—		—		16	0
Career total			14	0	2	0	0	0	0	0	3	0	19	0
