= Liam van Gelderen =

Surinamese footballer (born 2001)

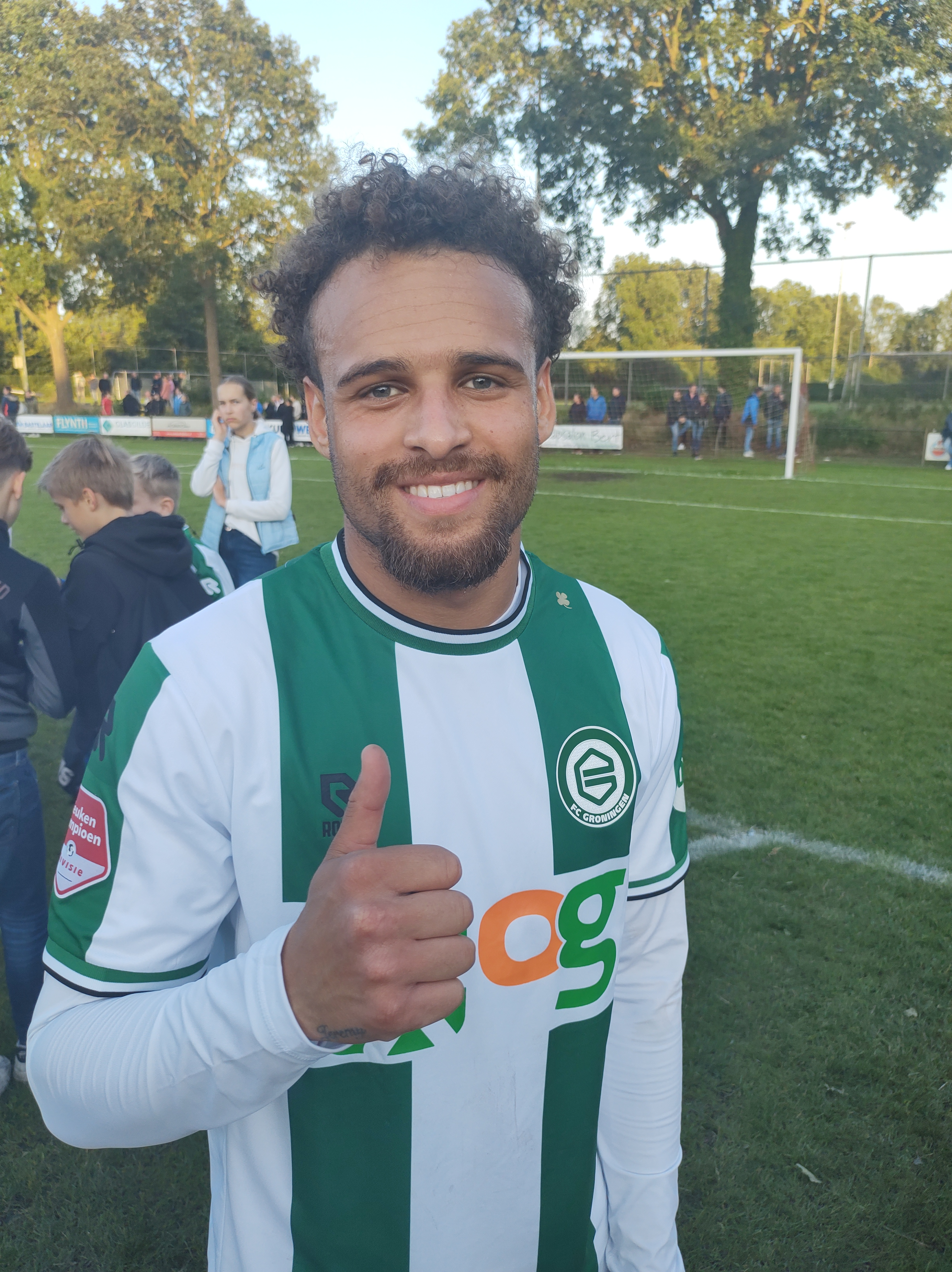
- Van Gelderen with Groningen

Personal information
- Date of birth: 23 March 2001 (age 25)
- Place of birth: Zaandam, Netherlands
- Height: 1.78 m (5 ft 10 in)
- Position: Right-back

Team information
- Current team: RKC
- Number: 4

Youth career
- SVA Assendelft
- –2012: Fortuna Wormerveer
- 2012–2015: AZ
- 2015–2019: Ajax

Senior career*
Years	Team	Apps	(Gls)
2019–2022	Jong Ajax	58	(2)
2022	Ajax	2	(0)
2022–2024	Groningen	23	(2)
2024–	RKC	54	(0)

International career^{‡}
2015–2016	Netherlands U15	5	(1)
2017	Netherlands U16	6	(1)
2017–2018	Netherlands U17	18	(2)
2018–2019	Netherlands U18	5	(0)
2019	Netherlands U19	2	(0)
2024–	Suriname	15	(1)
Medal record
Representing Netherlands
UEFA European Under-17 Championship
Winner	England 2018	U-17 Team
- * Club domestic league appearances and goals as of 25 April 2026 ‡ National team caps and goals as of 27 March 2026

Liam van Gelderen (born 23 March 2001) is a professional footballer who plays as a right-back for Eerste Divisie club RKC Waalwijk. Born in the Netherlands, he represents the Suriname national team.

== Club career ==
=== Ajax ===
Van Gelderen started his football journey in the youth teams of SVA Assendelft, Fortuna Wormerveer, and AZ. In 2015, he joined the Ajax Youth Academy, signing a contract until 2020 in February 2018.

He made his debut for Jong Ajax in the Eerste Divisie on 25 March 2019, in a 3–3 draw against Jong Utrecht. In June 2020, he extended his contract for an additional three seasons, until mid-2023.

Van Gelderen was first named to the bench for the senior Ajax team on 27 February 2022, in a league loss to Go Ahead Eagles. He made his Eredivisie debut for Ajax on 23 April 2022 in a game against NEC as a 45th-minute substitute for the injured Perr Schuurs.

=== Groningen ===
On 17 June 2022, Van Gelderen signed a four-year contract with Groningen. He made his debut for the club on 14 August, replacing Neraysho Kasanwirjo in the 92nd minute of a resounding 6–1 league loss to his former club, Ajax. On 25 February 2023, he scored his first goal for the Trots van het Noorden, contributing to a 3–0 home victory against Excelsior. At the end of the season, Groningen suffered relegation to the second-tier Eerste Divisie for the first time in 23 years, with Van Gelderen having scored once in 18 total appearances.

=== RKC Waalwijk ===
On 26 July 2024, van Gelderen joined RKC Waalwijk on a three-year contract.

== International career ==
Born in the Netherlands, Van Gelderen is of Surinamese descent. He is a former youth international for the Netherlands.

On 5 September 2024, van Gelderen made his debut for the Suriname national team in a 3–1 away win against Guyana.

On 26 March 2026, he scored his first international goal for Suriname against Bolivia in the 2026 FIFA World Cup Inter-Confederation Play-off semifinal.

== Career statistics ==
As of match played 23 October 2023

Appearances and goals by club, season and competition
Club	Season	League			National cup		Other		Total	
Club	Season	Division	Apps	Goals	Apps	Goals	Apps	Goals	Apps	Goals
Jong Ajax	2018–19	Eerste Divisie	1	0	—		—		1	0
Jong Ajax	2019–20	Eerste Divisie	17	0	—		—		17	0
Jong Ajax	2020–21	Eerste Divisie	11	1	—		—		11	1
Jong Ajax	2021–22	Eerste Divisie	29	1	—		—		29	1
Jong Ajax	Total		58	2	—		—		58	2
Ajax	2021–22	Eredivisie	2	0	0	0	—		2	0
Groningen	2022–23	Eredivisie	17	1	1	0	—		18	1
Groningen	2023–24	Eerste Divisie	6	1	0	0	—		6	1
Groningen	Total		23	2	1	0	—		24	2
Career total			83	4	1	0	0	0	84	2

Scores and results list Suriname's goal tally first, score column indicates score after each van Gelderen goal.

List of international goals scored by Liam van Gelderen
No.	Date	Venue	Opponent	Score	Result	Competition
1	26 March 2026	Estadio BBVA, Guadalupe, Mexico	Bolivia	1–0	1–2	2026 FIFA World Cup qualification

== Honours ==
Ajax

- Eredivisie: 2021–22

Netherlands U17

- UEFA European Under-17 Championship: 2018

Individual

- UEFA European Under-17 Championship Team of the Tournament: 2018
- Eredivisie Team of the Month: January 2025
