= Saint-Denis Saint-Leu FC =

French football club, 1996–1999

- Full name: Saint-Denis Saint-Leu Football Club
- Founded: 1996
- Dissolved: 1999
- Ground: Stade Municipal de Saint-Leu

Saint-Denis Saint-Leu FC was a French football club founded in the summer of 1996, following the merger of FC Saint-Leu (which played in the National) with US Saint-Denis, a club from the Division d'honneur. The goal of the merger was to create a "large suburban club with European ambition", capable of occupying the brand new Stade de France in Saint-Denis, just north of Paris.

Dominique Rocheteau was the general manager. The club applied in March 1998 to become the resident club. At the end of the 1997–1998 season, after only three seasons of existence and due to financial difficulties, the club was administratively relegated to the CFA (Championnat de France amateur).
