= Joey Pelupessy =

Indonesian footballer (born 1993)

- Pelupessy with Indonesia in 2025

Personal information
- Full name: Joey Mathijs Pelupessy
- Date of birth: 15 May 1993 (age 33)
- Place of birth: Nijverdal, Netherlands
- Height: 1.80 m (5 ft 11 in)
- Positions: Defensive midfielder; centre-back

Team information
- Current team: Lommel
- Number: 6

Youth career
- SVVN
- VA FC Twente

Senior career*
Years	Team	Apps	(Gls)
2013–2014	Twente	3	(0)
2013–2014	Jong Twente	30	(2)
2014–2018	Heracles Almelo	103	(2)
2018–2021	Sheffield Wednesday	106	(1)
2021–2022	Giresunspor	20	(0)
2022–2025	Groningen	56	(1)
2025–	Lommel	49	(3)

International career^{‡}
2009	Netherlands U16	1	(0)
2010–2011	Netherlands U18	6	(0)
2011–2012	Netherlands U19	2	(0)
2013	Netherlands U20	2	(0)
2025–	Indonesia	14	(0)
Medal record
Men's football
Representing Indonesia
FIFA ASEAN Cup
Winner	2026 Indonesia	Team
- * Club domestic league appearances and goals as of 1 November 2026 ‡ National team caps and goals as of 5 October 2026

Joey Mathijs Pelupessy (born 15 May 1993), better known as Joey Pelupessy, is a professional footballer who plays either as a defensive-midfielder or centre-back for Belgian Pro League club Lommel. Born in the Netherlands, he represents the Indonesia national team.

== Club career ==
=== Twente ===
Pelupessy formerly played for Twente between 2004 and 2014, having progressed through to the club's senior team after playing in the club's U19 and U21 teams. In the 2013–14 season, Pelupessy was selected for three match squads for the senior team, but he didn't make an appearance for the club before the transferred to fellow Eredivisie side Heracles Almelo.

=== Heracles Almelo ===
Pelupessy joined Heracles Almelo in July 2014 on a free transfer, where he was assigned the number 14 shirt. He scored his first goal for his new club on 4 October 2014, which was also his team's fourth goal in their Eredivisie game against NAC Breda. The match ultimately ended 6–1.

At the start of the 2017–18 season, his final season at the club, Pelupessy was made team captain. After 117 appearances and five goals for Heracles Almelo, Pelupessy left the club to sign for EFL Championship team Sheffield Wednesday.

=== Sheffield Wednesday ===
On 18 January 2018, Pelupessy signed for EFL Championship team Sheffield Wednesday, becoming new manager Jos Luhukay's first signing for the club. He was assigned the number 32 shirt. He scored his first goal for the Owls on 20 February 2018 against Millwall. On 4 June 2020, he extended his stay at the club by a further year until 2021.

On 20 May 2021, it was announced that he would leave Sheffield Wednesday at the end of the season, following the expiry of his contract.

=== Giresunspor ===
In July 2021, he joined Turkish side Giresunspor.

=== Groningen ===
On 25 April 2022, Pelupessy agreed to return to the Netherlands and join Groningen on a three-year deal.

=== Lommel ===
On 19 January 2025, Pelupessy signed a one-and-a-half-year contract with Lommel in Belgium.

== International career ==
Pelupessy was a youth international for the Netherlands. He has first represented the country from under-16 to under-20.

In February 2025, it was announced that Pelupessy had decided to represent Indonesia at international level. On 9 March, he received a call-up from Indonesia national team for 2026 FIFA World Cup qualification matches against Australia and Bahrain. On 25 March, he made his debut in a 1–0 win over Bahrain.

== Personal life ==
Born in the Netherlands, Pelupessy is of Indonesian descent through his Moluccan father.

On 10 March 2025, Pelupessy officially obtained Indonesian citizenship.

== Career statistics ==
=== Club ===
As of match played 1 November 2026

Appearances and goals by club, season and competition
Club	Season	League			National cup		League cup		Other		Total	
Club	Season	League	Apps	Goals	Apps	Goals	Apps	Goals	Apps	Goals	Apps	Goals
Twente	2012–13	Eredivisie	3	0	2	0	—		2 (Note: Appearances in the Europa League)	0	7	0
Jong Twente	2013–14	Eerste Divisie	30	2	—		—		—		30	2
Heracles Almelo	2014–15	Eredivisie	17	1	2	0	—		0	0	19	1
Heracles Almelo	2015–16	Eredivisie	34	0	3	0	—		4 (Note: Appearances in the Eredivisie European competition play-offs)	1	41	1
Heracles Almelo	2016–17	Eredivisie	34	1	3	1	—		2	0	39	2
Heracles Almelo	2017–18	Eredivisie	18	0	2	1	—		0	0	20	1
Heracles Almelo	Total		103	2	10	2	0	0	6	1	119	5
Sheffield Wednesday	2017–18	Championship	17	1	2	0	0	0	0	0	19	1
Sheffield Wednesday	2018–19	Championship	33	0	2	0	0	0	0	0	35	0
Sheffield Wednesday	2019–20	Championship	17	0	3	0	2	0	0	0	22	0
Sheffield Wednesday	2020–21	Championship	38	0	2	0	2	0	0	0	42	0
Sheffield Wednesday	Total		106	1	9	0	4	0	0	0	119	1
Giresunspor	2021–22	Süper Lig	20	0	2	0	—		—		22	0
Groningen	2022–23	Eredivisie	19	1	2	0	—		—		21	1
Groningen	2023–24	Eerste Divisie	25	0	4	0	—		—		29	0
Groningen	2024–25	Eredivisie	12	0	0	0	—		—		12	0
Groningen	Total		56	1	6	0	—		—		62	1
Lommel	2024–25	Challenger Pro League	12	0	0	0	—		—		12	0
Lommel	2025–26	Challenger Pro League	28	3	0	0	—		6 (Note: Appearance(s) in promotion/relegation play-offs)	0	34	3
Lommel	2026–27	Belgian Pro League	9	0	1	0	—		—		10	0
Lommel	Total		49	3	1	0	0	0	6	0	56	3
Career total			366	9	30	2	4	0	14	1	414	12

=== International ===
As of match played 5 October 2026

Appearances and goals by national team and year
National team	Year	Apps	Goals
Indonesia	2025	6	0
Indonesia	2026	8	0
Total		14	0

== Honours ==
Indonesia

- FIFA ASEAN Cup: 2026

== See also ==
- List of Indonesia international footballers born outside Indonesia
