= Daniël Beukers =

Dutch footballer

Personal information
- Date of birth: 28 January 2004 (age 22)
- Place of birth: Spakenburg, Netherlands
- Height: 1.81 m (5 ft 11 in)
- Position: Right back

Team information
- Current team: IJsselmeervogels (on loan from Volendam)
- Number: 32

Youth career
- –2018: IJsselmeervogels
- 2018–2023: AZ

Senior career*
Years	Team	Apps	(Gls)
2023	Jong AZ	7	(0)
2023–2024	Groningen II	9	(1)
2023–2024	Groningen	0	(0)
2024–	Volendam	7	(1)
2025–2026	→ Emmen (loan)	25	(0)
2026–	→ IJsselmeervogels (loan)	3	(0)

International career
2023	Netherlands U20	1	(0)
- * Club domestic league appearances and goals as of 3 October 2026

Daniël Beukers (born 28 January 2004) is a Dutch footballer who plays as a right back for Tweede Divisie club IJsselmeervogels on loan from Volendam.

== Club career ==
From Spakenburg, Beukers played for IJsselmeervogels at youth level. He switched to the academy at AZ Alkmaar in 2018 at the under-15 age group level. In January 2021 he signed an eighteen-month professional contract. He made his professional debut on February 2, 2023, in the Eerste Divisie when starting for Jong AZ against VVV Venlo. With AZ under-19s playing in the 2022-23 UEFA Youth League he was part of the team that beat Barcelona and Real Madrid on consecutive rounds to reach the semi-finals in March 2023. Beukers scored twice in the quarter-final UEFA Youth League tie against Real Madrid, with the second being a solo goal that brought praise. He started in the final against Hajduk Split as AZ ran out 5–0 winners.

In June 2023, Beukers signed for recently relegated Eerste Divisie club Groningen on a four-year contract with the option for a further year.

On 7 June 2024, Beukers moved to Volendam on a three-year deal. On 24 July 2025, he was loaned by Emmen.

== International career ==
On 25 March 2023 he played for the Netherlands national under-20 football team in a 2–1 friendly win against France national under-20 football team.
