= Yahya Kalley =

Swedish footballer

Personal information
- Date of birth: 20 March 2001 (age 25)
- Place of birth: Oxie, Sweden
- Height: 1.85 m (6 ft 1 in)
- Position: Left-back

Team information
- Current team: Dinamo Batumi
- Number: 5

Youth career
- –2011: BK Vången
- 2012–2020: Malmö FF

Senior career*
Years	Team	Apps	(Gls)
2020–2021	IFK Göteborg	17	(0)
2021–2023	Groningen	9	(0)
2023	→ IFK Norrköping (loan)	27	(0)
2023–2026	IFK Norrköping	42	(0)
2026	Estrela da Amadora	3	(0)
2026–	Dinamo Batumi	4	(0)

International career^{‡}
2018	Sweden U19	2	(0)
2020	Sweden U21	1	(0)
- * Club domestic league appearances and goals as of 25 May 2026 ‡ National team caps and goals as of 18:33, 29 July 2021 (UTC)

Yahya Kalley (born 20 March 2001) is a Swedish professional footballer who plays as a left-back for Erovnuli Liga club Dinamo Batumi in Georgia.

== Club career ==
On 8 July 2023, IFK Norrköping signed Kalley on a permanent basis until the end of 2025, following his loan.

On 30 January 2026, Kalley joined Portuguese Primeira Liga club Estrela da Amadora on a contract until June 2028.

== International career ==
Born in Sweden, Kalley is of Gambian descent. He is a youth international for Sweden.
