= Thom van Bergen =

Dutch footballer (born 2004)

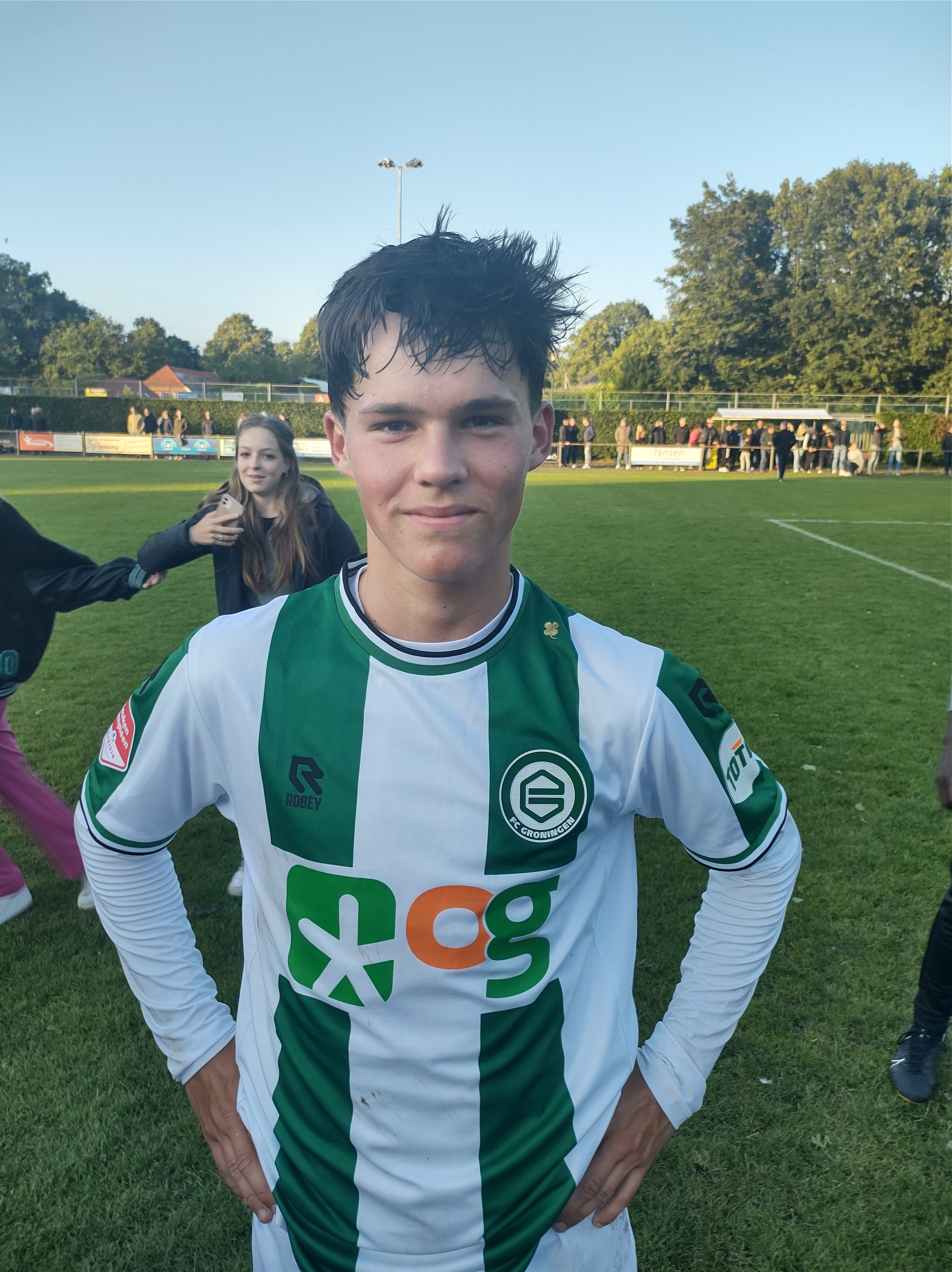
- van Bergen with Groningen in 2023

Personal information
- Date of birth: 6 January 2004 (age 22)
- Place of birth: Groningen, Netherlands
- Height: 1.80 m (5 ft 11 in)
- Position: Centre-forward

Team information
- Current team: Groningen
- Number: 25

Youth career
- –2015: VV Gorecht
- 2015–2023: Groningen

Senior career*
Years	Team	Apps	(Gls)
2023–	Groningen	116	(23)
- * Club domestic league appearances and goals as of 19 May 2026

Thom van Bergen (born 6 January 2004) is a Dutch professional footballer who plays as a centre-forward for Eredivisie club Groningen.

== Career ==
=== Early career ===
Thom van Bergen started his football career at VV Gorecht. In 2015, he joined the FC Groningen youth academy at the age of 11.

=== FC Groningen ===
Van Bergen received his first senior team call up on 1 October 2022 against AZ Alkmaar.

In December 2022, he signed his first contract with FC Groningen until June 2024.

He made his Eredivisie debut for Groningen on 8 January 2023 in a game against Excelsior as a starter. In July 2023 he signed a new three-year agreement with FC Groningen, which includes an optional year. On 22 September 2023 he scored his first senior goal against Helmond Sport.

== Career statistics ==
As of match played 16 March 2025

Club	Season	League			National cup		Other		Total	
Club	Season	Division	Apps	Goals	Apps	Goals	Apps	Goals	Apps	Goals
FC Groningen	2022–23	Eredivisie	12	0	1	0	—		13	0
FC Groningen	2023–24	Eerste divisie	36	9	5	0	—		41	9
FC Groningen	2024–25	Eredivisie	25	3	2	0	—		27	3
Total			73	12	8	0	—		81	9

== International career ==
In March 2023 van Bergen received his first call up of the Netherlands U20 for an international friendly against France U20. He stayed on the bench as a substitute during the whole match.
