= Rui Mendes =

Portuguese footballer (born 1999)

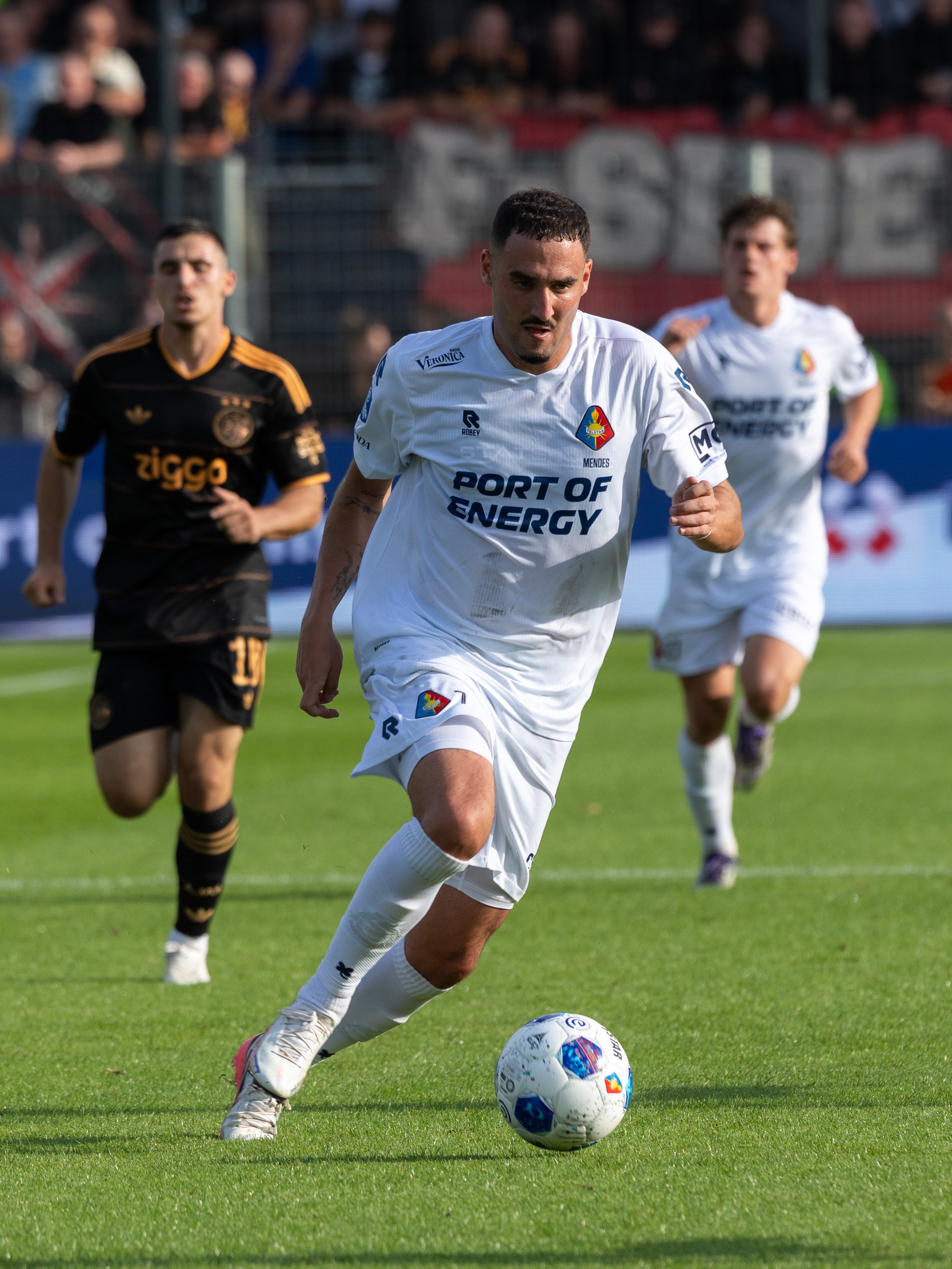
- Rui Mendes in the match against AFC Ajax

Personal information
- Full name: Rui Jorge Monteiro Mendes
- Date of birth: 10 November 1999 (age 27)
- Place of birth: Gondar, Amarante, Portugal
- Height: 1.80 m (5 ft 11 in)
- Position: Right winger

Team information
- Current team: Telstar
- Number: 7

Youth career
- 2016–2018: Arminia Bielefeld

Senior career*
Years	Team	Apps	(Gls)
2018–2021	TSG Hoffenheim II	59	(10)
2021–2024	Emmen	69	(18)
2024–2026	Groningen	34	(3)
2026–	Telstar	5	(1)
- * Club domestic league appearances and goals as of 19 May 2026

Rui Jorge Monteiro Mendes (born 10 November 1999) is a Portuguese professional footballer who plays as a right winger for Eredivisie club Telstar.

== Early life ==
From Gondor, in Amarante, Portugal, Mendes moved at the age of seven to Dissen, Lower Saxony with his family. He was in the youth academy of Arminia Bielefeld but was not offered a professional contract. Instead he joined up with TSG Hoffenheim aged 18 on a two-year contract. He trained with the first team under Julian Nagelsmann and played for their second team before ultimately leaving on a free transfer in 2021.

== Career ==
During a trial game for FC Emmen Mendes scored twice against Heracles Almelo to earn a contract.

In the 2021–22 season, Mendes was instrumental in FC Emmen's championship winning season in the Eerste Divisie. Mendes scored in eight consecutive games, just one short of the all time FC Emmen record from the 2001–02 season, when Paul Weerman scored in nine consecutive matches.

In January 2024, Mendes joined Eerste Divisie club Groningen on a three-and-a-half-year deal.

In July 2026, Mendes moved to Eredivisie club Telstar for two seasons.

== Honours ==
Emmen

- Eerste Divisie: 2021–22
